= Swimming at the 1988 Summer Olympics – Women's 4 × 100 metre medley relay =

Women's 4 × 100 metre medley relay at the Games of the XXIV Olympiad
- Venue: Jamsil Indoor Swimming Pool
- Date: 24 September 1988 (heats & final)
- Competitors: 72 from 18 nations
- Teams: 18
- Winning time: 4:03.74 OR

Medalists
1st place, gold medalist(s)		Kristin Otto, Silke Hörner, Birte Weigang, Katrin Meissner, Cornelia Sirch*, Manuela Stellmach*	East Germany
2nd place, silver medalist(s)		Beth Barr, Tracey McFarlane, Janel Jorgensen, Mary Wayte, Betsy Mitchell*, Mary T. Meagher*, Dara Torres*	United States
3rd place, bronze medalist(s)		Lori Melien, Allison Higson, Jane Kerr, Andrea Nugent, Keltie Duggan*, Patricia Noall*; *Indicates the swimmer only competed in the preliminary heats.	Canada

The women's 4 × 100 metre freestyle relay event at the 1988 Summer Olympics took place on 24 September at the Jamsil Indoor Swimming Pool in Seoul, South Korea.

== Records ==
Prior to this competition, the existing world and Olympic records were as follows.

World record	East Germany (GDR); Ina Kleber (1:00.59); Sylvia Gerasch (1:08.69); Ines Geißler (59.52); Birgit Meineke (54.89)	4:03.69	Moscow, Soviet Union	24 August 1984
Olympic record	East Germany; Rica Reinisch (1:01.51); Ute Geweniger (1:09.46); Andrea Pollack (1:00.14); Caren Metschuck (55.56)	4:06.67	Moscow, Soviet Union	20 July 1980

The following new world and Olympic records were set during this competition.

Date	Event	Name	Nationality	Time	Record
24 September	Final	Kristin Otto (1:01.03); Silke Hörner (1:08.20); Birte Weigang (59.51); Katrin Meissner (55.00)	East Germany	4:03.74	OR

== Results ==
=== Heats ===
Rule: The eight fastest teams advance to the final (Q).

Rank	Heat	Nation	Swimmers	Time	Notes
1	2	East Germany	Cornelia Sirch (1:02.34); Silke Hörner (1:09.37); Birte Weigang (1:00.75); Manuela Stellmach (56.07)	4:08.53	Q
2	3	United States	Betsy Mitchell (1:02.66); Tracey McFarlane (1:10.33); Mary T. Meagher (1:01.64); Dara Torres (55.75)	4:10.38	Q
3	3	Netherlands	Jolanda de Rover (1:04.03); Linda Moes (1:10.74); Conny van Bentum (1:00.62); Karin Brienesse (56.43)	4:11.82	Q
4	3	West Germany	Svenja Schlicht (1:03.56); Britta Dahm (1:12.56); Gabi Reha (1:01.54); Marion Aizpors (55.53)	4:13.19	Q
5	2	Canada	Lori Melien (1:03.80); Keltie Duggan (1:11.58); Jane Kerr (1:02.42); Patricia Noall (56.43)	4:14.23	Q
6	1	Australia	Nicole Livingstone (1:04.07); Lara Hooiveld (1:10.97); Fiona Alessandri (1:02.12); Karen van Wirdum (57.16)	4:14.32	Q
7	1	Italy	Lorenza Vigarani (1:03.64); Manuela Dalla Valle (1:11.17); Ilaria Tocchini (1:02.24); Silvia Persi (57.63)	4:14.68	Q
8	2	Bulgaria	Bistra Gospodinova (1:05.23); Tanya Dangalakova (1:09.31); Neviana Miteva (1:02.82); Natasha Khristova (57.86)	4:15.22	Q
9	3	Great Britain	Katherine Read (1:04.86); Suki Brownsdon (1:11.74); Caroline Foot (1:01.97); Joanna Coull (57.61)	4:16.18	
10	3	France	Laurence Guillou (1:05.28); Pascaline Louvrier (1:13.72); Catherine Plewinski (59.86); Jacqueline Delord (57.35)	4:16.21	
11	2	Sweden	Johanna Larsson (1:05.10); Anna-Karin Persson (1:12.40); Agneta Eriksson (1:02.95); Eva Nyberg (57.27)	4:17.72	
12	1	Japan	Satoko Morishita (1:05.23); Yoshie Nishioka (1:13.63); Kiyomi Takahashi (1:01.95); Ayako Nakano (58.07)	4:18.88	
13	1	Spain	Natalia Autric (1:06.74); Silvia Parera (1:14.87); María Luisa Fernández (1:02.45); Amaya Garbayo (57.78)	4:21.84	
14	3	South Korea	Hong Ji-hee (1:08.52); Park Sung-won (1:14.57); Lee Hong-mi (1:05.73); Han Young-hee (1:00.08)	4:28.90	
15	2	Costa Rica	Silvia Poll (1:04.02); Sigrid Niehaus (1:17.56); Marcela Cuesta (1:09.89); Carolina Mauri (1:00.28)	4:31.75	
16	1	Chinese Taipei	Wang Chi (1:10.75); Carwai Seto (1:15.45); Chang Hui-chien (1:07.95); Kimberly Chen (1:05.34)	4:39.49	
	1	China	Yang Wenyi; Huang Xiaomin; Qian Hong; Zhuang Yong	DSQ	
	2	Denmark	Mette Jacobsen; Pia Sørensen; Annette Jørgensen; Gitta Jensen	DSQ	

=== Final ===
Rank	Lane	Nation	Swimmers	Time	Notes
1st place, gold medalist(s)	4	East Germany	Kristin Otto (1:01.03); Silke Hörner (1:08.20); Birte Weigang (59.51); Katrin Meissner (55.00)	4:03.74	OR
2nd place, silver medalist(s)	5	United States	Beth Barr (1:02.56); Tracey McFarlane (1:10.22); Janel Jorgensen (59.84); Mary Wayte (55.28)	4:07.90	
3rd place, bronze medalist(s)	2	Canada	Lori Melien (1:04.25); Allison Higson (1:08.15); Jane Kerr (1:01.78); Andrea Nugent (56.31)	4:10.49	
4	7	Australia	Nicole Livingstone (1:03.43); Lara Hooiveld (1:10.49); Fiona Alessandri (1:00.87); Karen van Wirdum (56.78)	4:11.57	OC
5	3	Netherlands	Jolanda de Rover (1:03.76); Linda Moes (1:11.40); Conny van Bentum (1:00.30); Karin Brienesse (56.73)	4:12.19	
6	8	Bulgaria	Bistra Gospodinova (1:04.87); Tanya Dangalakova (1:07.95); Neviana Miteva (1:02.76); Natasha Khristova (56.78)	4:12.36	
7	6	West Germany	Svenja Schlicht (1:03.46); Britta Dahm (1:12.36); Gabi Reha (1:01.79); Marion Aizpors (55.28)	4:12.89	
8	1	Italy	Lorenza Vigarani (1:03.96); Manuela Dalla Valle (1:10.63); Ilaria Tocchini (1:01.93); Silvia Persi (57.33)	4:13.85	
