= Swimming at the 1988 Summer Olympics – Women's 100 metre backstroke =

Women's 100 metre backstroke at the Games of the XXIV Olympiad
- Venue: Jamsil Indoor Swimming Pool
- Date: 22 September 1988 (heats & final)
- Competitors: 41 from 30 nations
- Winning time: 1:00.89

Medalists
1st place, gold medalist(s)		Kristin Otto	East Germany
2nd place, silver medalist(s)		Krisztina Egerszegi	Hungary
3rd place, bronze medalist(s)		Cornelia Sirch	East Germany

The women's 100 metre backstroke event at the 1988 Summer Olympics took place on 22 September at the Jamsil Indoor Swimming Pool in Seoul, South Korea.

== Records ==
Prior to this competition, the existing world and Olympic records were as follows.

World record	Ina Kleber (GDR)	1:00.59	Moscow, Soviet Union	24 August 1984
Olympic record	Rica Reinisch (GDR)	1:00.86	Moscow, Soviet Union	23 July 1980

== Schedule ==
All times are Korea Standard Time (UTC+9)

Date	Time	Round
22 September 1988	10:00	Heats
22 September 1988	20:00	Final

== Results ==
=== Heats ===
Rule: The eight fastest swimmers advance to final A (Q), while the next eight to final B (q).

Rank	Heat	Name	Nationality	Time	Notes
1	6	Kristin Otto	East Germany	1:01.45	Q
2	5	Cornelia Sirch	East Germany	1:01.63	Q
3	5	Krisztina Egerszegi	Hungary	1:02.09	Q
4	6	Beth Barr	United States	1:02.63	Q
5	4	Betsy Mitchell	United States	1:02.85	Q
6	5	Silvia Poll	Costa Rica	1:03.21	Q, NR
7	6	Nicole Livingstone	Australia	1:03.26	Q
8	6	Marion Aizpors	West Germany	1:03.27	Q
9	4	Anca Pătrășcoiu	Romania	1:03.29	q
10	5	Svenja Schlicht	West Germany	1:03.72	q
11	4	Lorenza Vigarani	Italy	1:03.96	q
12	5	Lori Melien	Canada	1:04.29	q
13	5	Jolanda de Rover	Netherlands	1:04.39	q
14	5	Sharon Musson	New Zealand	1:04.58	q
15	6	Katherine Read	Great Britain	1:04.62	q
16	4	Manuela Carosi	Italy	1:04.69	qSO
16	6	Karen Lord	Australia	1:04.69	qSO
18	5	Sharon Page	Great Britain	1:04.75	
19	4	Bistra Gospodinova	Bulgaria	1:04.91	
20	4	Laurence Guillou	France	1:05.07	
20	4	Eva Gysling	Switzerland	1:05.07	
22	6	Johanna Larsson	Sweden	1:05.10	
23	3	Wang Bolin	China	1:05.15	
24	6	Satoko Morishita	Japan	1:05.38	
25	4	Sylvia Hume	New Zealand	1:05.81	
26	3	Tomoko Onogi	Japan	1:06.14	
27	3	Michelle Smith	Ireland	1:06.22	
28	3	Akiko Thomson	Philippines	1:06.51	
29	3	Aileen Convery	Ireland	1:06.73	
30	3	Hong Ji-hee	South Korea	1:08.33	
31	3	Rita Jean Garay	Puerto Rico	1:08.58	
32	3	Wang Chi	Chinese Taipei	1:09.56	
33	2	Ana Joselina Fortin	Honduras	1:10.10	
34	2	Tricia Duncan	Virgin Islands	1:10.37	
35	2	Tsang Wing Sze	Hong Kong	1:10.50	
36	2	Sharon Pickering	Fiji	1:12.14	
37	1	Angela Birch	Fiji	1:13.48	
38	1	Katerine Moreno	Bolivia	1:14.42	
39	2	Elsa Freire	Angola	1:15.56	
40	1	Carolina Araujo	Mozambique	1:15.86	
41	2	Carla Fernandes	Angola	1:21.58	

==== Swimoff ====
Round 1

Rank	Lane	Name	Nationality	Time	Notes
1	5	Manuela Carosi	Italy	1:05.05	qSO
1	4	Karen Lord	Australia	1:05.05	qSO

Round 2

Rank	Lane	Name	Nationality	Time	Notes
1	5	Manuela Carosi	Italy	1:04.62	q
2	4	Karen Lord	Australia	1:04.75	

=== Finals ===
==== Final B ====
Rank	Lane	Name	Nationality	Time	Notes
9	4	Anca Pătrășcoiu	Romania	1:03.33	
10	5	Svenja Schlicht	West Germany	1:03.68	
11	8	Manuela Carosi	Italy	1:03.80	
12	6	Lori Melien	Canada	1:03.87	
13	3	Lorenza Vigarani	Italy	1:03.88	
14	2	Jolanda de Rover	Netherlands	1:04.11	
15	7	Sharon Musson	New Zealand	1:04.17	
16	1	Katherine Read	Great Britain	1:04.27	

==== Final A ====
Rank	Lane	Name	Nationality	Time	Notes
1st place, gold medalist(s)	4	Kristin Otto	East Germany	1:00.89	
2nd place, silver medalist(s)	3	Krisztina Egerszegi	Hungary	1:01.56	
3rd place, bronze medalist(s)	5	Cornelia Sirch	East Germany	1:01.57	
4	2	Betsy Mitchell	United States	1:02.71	
5	6	Beth Barr	United States	1:02.78	
6	7	Silvia Poll	Costa Rica	1:03.34	
7	1	Nicole Livingstone	Australia	1:04.15	
8	8	Marion Aizpors	West Germany	1:04.19	
