= Swimming at the 1988 Summer Olympics – Women's 200 metre backstroke =

Women's 200 metre backstroke at the Games of the XXIV Olympiad
- Venue: Jamsil Indoor Swimming Pool
- Date: 25 September 1988 (heats & finals)
- Competitors: 34 from 25 nations
- Winning time: 2:09.29 OR

Medalists
1st place, gold medalist(s)		Krisztina Egerszegi	Hungary
2nd place, silver medalist(s)		Kathrin Zimmermann	East Germany
3rd place, bronze medalist(s)		Cornelia Sirch	East Germany

The women's 200 metre backstroke event at the 1988 Summer Olympics took place on 25 September at the Jamsil Indoor Swimming Pool in Seoul, South Korea.

== Records ==
Prior to this competition, the existing world and Olympic records were as follows.

World record	Betsy Mitchell (USA)	2:08.60	Orlando, United States	27 June 1986
Olympic record	Rica Reinisch (GDR)	2:11.77	Moscow, Soviet Union	27 July 1980

The following records were established during the competition:

Date	Round	Name	Nationality	Time	Record
25 September	Heat 4	Krisztina Egerszegi	Hungary	2:11.01	OR
25 September	Heat 5	Cornelia Sirch	East Germany	2:10.46	OR
25 September	Final A	Krisztina Egerszegi	Hungary	2:09.29	OR

== Results ==
=== Heats ===
Rule: The eight fastest swimmers advance to final A (Q), while the next eight to final B (q).

Rank	Heat	Name	Nationality	Time	Notes
1	5	Cornelia Sirch	East Germany	2:10.46	Q, OR
2	4	Krisztina Egerszegi	Hungary	2:11.01	Q
3	3	Kathrin Zimmermann	East Germany	2:12.81	Q
4	4	Beth Barr	United States	2:13.91	Q
5	5	Andrea Hayes	United States	2:14.77	Q
6	5	Nicole Livingstone	Australia	2:14.81	Q
7	4	Jolanda de Rover	Netherlands	2:16.58	Q
8	4	Svenja Schlicht	West Germany	2:16.81	Q
9	5	Karen Lord	Australia	2:16.94	q
10	4	Katherine Read	Great Britain	2:17.22	q
11	3	Anca Pătrășcoiu	Romania	2:17.25	q
12	4	Lorenza Vigarani	Italy	2:17.35	q
13	5	Sharon Musson	New Zealand	2:17.47	q
14	3	Johanna Larsson	Sweden	2:18.01	q
15	2	Lin Li	China	2:18.11	q
16	5	Satoko Morishita	Japan	2:18.74	q
17	5	Michelle Smith	Ireland	2:19.50	
18	2	Aileen Convery	Ireland	2:19.91	
19	3	Lori Melien	Canada	2:20.45	
20	5	Tomoko Onogi	Japan	2:21.46	
21	3	Sylvia Hume	New Zealand	2:21.55	
22	4	Helen Slatter	Great Britain	2:21.66	
23	4	Wang Bolin	China	2:21.70	
24	2	Rita Jean Garay	Puerto Rico	2:23.73	
25	3	Christine Magnier	France	2:24.15	
26	2	Hong Ji-hee	South Korea	2:24.58	
27	2	Eva Gysling	Switzerland	2:24.61	
28	3	Katja Ziliox	West Germany	2:26.25	
29	1	Ana Joselina Fortin	Honduras	2:32.13	
30	1	Tricia Duncan	Virgin Islands	2:33.97	
31	2	Wang Chi	Chinese Taipei	2:36.60	
32	1	Sharon Pickering	Fiji	2:36.99	
	2	Akiko Thomson	Philippines	DNS	
	3	Ruth Hochstatter	Austria	DNS	

=== Finals ===
==== Final B ====
Rank	Lane	Name	Nationality	Time	Notes
9	3	Anca Pătrășcoiu	Romania	2:15.75	
10	2	Sharon Musson	New Zealand	2:16.06	
11	1	Lin Li	China	2:16.68	
12	5	Katherine Read	Great Britain	2:18.20	
13	6	Lorenza Vigarani	Italy	2:18.69	
14	4	Karen Lord	Australia	2:18.78	
14	8	Satoko Morishita	Japan	2:18.78	
	7	Johanna Larsson	Sweden	DSQ	

==== Final A ====
Rank	Lane	Name	Nationality	Time	Notes
1st place, gold medalist(s)	5	Krisztina Egerszegi	Hungary	2:09.29	OR
2nd place, silver medalist(s)	3	Kathrin Zimmermann	East Germany	2:10.61	
3rd place, bronze medalist(s)	4	Cornelia Sirch	East Germany	2:11.45	
4	6	Beth Barr	United States	2:12.39	
5	7	Nicole Livingstone	Australia	2:13.43	
6	2	Andrea Hayes	United States	2:15.02	
7	1	Jolanda de Rover	Netherlands	2:15.17	
8	8	Svenja Schlicht	West Germany	2:15.94	
