= Swimming at the 1988 Summer Olympics – Women's 100 metre butterfly =

Women's 100 metre butterfly at the Games of the XXIV Olympiad
- Venue: Jamsil Indoor Swimming Pool
- Date: 23 September 1988 (heats & finals)
- Competitors: 40 from 28 nations
- Winning time: 59.00 OR

Medalists
1st place, gold medalist(s)		Kristin Otto	East Germany
2nd place, silver medalist(s)		Birte Weigang	East Germany
3rd place, bronze medalist(s)		Qian Hong	China

The women's 100 metre butterfly event at the 1988 Summer Olympics took place on 23 September at the Jamsil Indoor Swimming Pool in Seoul, South Korea.

== Records ==
Prior to this competition, the existing world and Olympic records were as follows.

World record	Mary T. Meagher (USA)	57.93	Brown Deer, United States	16 August 1981
Olympic record	Mary T. Meagher (USA)	59.05	Los Angeles, United States	2 August 1984

The following records were established during the competition:

Date	Round	Name	Nation	Time	Record
23 September	Final A	Kristin Otto	East Germany	59.00	OR

== Results ==
=== Heats ===
Rule: The eight fastest swimmers advance to final A (Q), while the next eight to final B (q).

Rank	Heat	Name	Nationality	Time	Notes
1	5	Catherine Plewinski	France	59.34	Q, NR
2	4	Birte Weigang	East Germany	59.97	Q
3	5	Kristin Otto	East Germany	1:00.40	Q
4	4	Qian Hong	China	1:00.66	Q
5	5	Conny van Bentum	Netherlands	1:00.94	Q
6	3	Janel Jorgensen	United States	1:00.97	Q
7	4	Wang Xiaohong	China	1:01.18	Q
8	3	Mary T. Meagher	United States	1:01.48	Q
9	5	Svitlana Kopchykova	Soviet Union	1:01.85	q
10	5	Fiona Alessandri	Australia	1:01.90	q
11	3	Neviana Miteva	Bulgaria	1:02.01	q
12	3	Kiyomi Takahashi	Japan	1:02.04	q
13	3	Ilaria Tocchini	Italy	1:02.07	q
14	4	Jacqueline Delord	France	1:02.24	q
15	5	Gabi Reha	West Germany	1:02.27	q
16	4	Takayo Kitano	Japan	1:02.39	q
17	2	María Luisa Fernández	Spain	1:02.47	
18	4	Caroline Foot	Great Britain	1:02.76	
19	4	Ina Beyermann	West Germany	1:02.85	
20	5	Jane Kerr	Canada	1:02.91	
21	3	Annabelle Cripps	Great Britain	1:03.34	
22	5	Agneta Eriksson	Sweden	1:03.45	
23	4	Andrea Nugent	Canada	1:03.69	
24	3	Emanuela Viola	Italy	1:03.91	
24	3	Stela Pura	Romania	1:03.91	
26	2	Lee Hong-mi	South Korea	1:04.36	
27	2	Sandra Neves	Portugal	1:04.60	
28	2	Blanca Morales	Guatemala	1:05.02	
29	2	Marlene Bruten	Mexico	1:05.37	
30	2	Kim Soo-jin	South Korea	1:06.14	
31	2	Hung Cee Kay	Hong Kong	1:06.94	
32	2	Chang Hui-chien	Chinese Taipei	1:07.36	
33	1	Marcela Cuesta	Costa Rica	1:07.66	
34	1	Nguyễn Kiều Oanh	Vietnam	1:07.96	
35	1	Ana Joselina Fortin	Honduras	1:07.99	
36	1	Annemarie Munk	Hong Kong	1:08.35	
37	1	Sharon Pickering	Fiji	1:10.51	
38	1	Cina Munch	Fiji	1:12.03	
39	1	Elsa Freire	Angola	1:12.27	
40	1	Barbara Gayle	Guam	1:12.84	

=== Finals ===
==== Final B ====
Rank	Lane	Name	Nationality	Time	Notes
9	4	Svitlana Kopchykova	Soviet Union	1:01.48	
10	6	Kiyomi Takahashi	Japan	1:01.80	
11	7	Jacqueline Delord	France	1:02.45	
12	3	Neviana Miteva	Bulgaria	1:02.47	
13	5	Fiona Alessandri	Australia	1:02.51	
14	8	Takayo Kitano	Japan	1:02.53	
15	1	Gabi Reha	West Germany	1:02.63	
16	2	Ilaria Tocchini	Italy	1:02.78	

==== Final A ====
Rank	Lane	Name	Nationality	Time	Notes
1st place, gold medalist(s)	3	Kristin Otto	East Germany	59.00	OR
2nd place, silver medalist(s)	5	Birte Weigang	East Germany	59.45	
3rd place, bronze medalist(s)	6	Qian Hong	China	59.52	
4	4	Catherine Plewinski	France	59.58	
5	7	Janel Jorgensen	United States	1:00.48	
6	2	Conny van Bentum	Netherlands	1:00.62	
7	8	Mary T. Meagher	United States	1:00.97	
8	1	Wang Xiaohong	China	1:01.15	
