= 1988–89 FINA Swimming World Cup =

The 1988–89 FINA Swimming World Cup was the first of the series under its current era. It took place at eight short course venues in Europe and North America in November 1988 and February 1989. Eighteen swim styles were included for men and women.

== Meets ==
Dates and locations for the 1988–1989 World Cup meets were:

Dates	Location
December 15–17, 1988	Toronto Canada
December 18-20, 1988	Indianapolis, United States [LCM]
February 3–5, 1989	Paris, France
February 7–8, 1989	East Berlin, East Germany [LCM]
February 10–12, 1989	Bonn, Germany
February 14–15, 1989	Gothenburg, Sweden
February 17–19, 1989	Venice, Italy
February 23–24, 1989	(United Kingdom) London, Great Britain

== Event winners ==
Event	Men Winner	Women Winner
Sprint	(Sweden) Anders Holmertz	(East Germany) Manuela Stellmach
Distance	(Canada) Turlough O'Hare	(Canada) Debbie Wurzburger
Backstroke	(United Kingdom) Grant Robbins	(Canada) Anne-Marie Andersen
Breaststroke	(Canada) Jon Cleveland	(United Kingdom) Suki Browndson
Butterfly	(Canada) Tom Ponting	(East Germany) Birte Weigang
Individual Medley	(Sweden) Jan Birdman	(United Kingdom) Suki Browndson

=== 25 freestyle ===
Meet	Men Winner	Time	Women Winner	Time
#1: Toronto	(Germany) Frank Henter	10.45	(Sweden) Helena Aberg	12.12
#8: London	(Switzerland) Dano Halsall	10.17	(East Germany) Daniela Hunger	12.25

=== 50 freestyle ===
Meet	Men Winner	Time	Women Winner	Time
#1: Toronto	N/A	N/A	N/A	N/A
#2: Indianapolis	(United States) Steve Croocker	22.74	(United States) A. Bock	26.12
#3: Paris	N/A	N/A	N/A	N/A
#4: East Berlin	(East Germany) Dirk Richter	23.38	(Netherlands) Marieke Mastenbroek	26.54
#5: Bonn	(United States) Steve Croocker	22.17	(United States) Jenny Thompson	25.50
#6: Gothenburg	N/A	N/A	N/A	N/A
#7: Venice	(Canada) Mark Foris	22.84	(United States) Jill Sterkel	25.90
#8: London	(Switzerland) Dano Halsall	22.66	(East Germany) Daniela Hunger	26.35

=== 100 freestyle ===
Meet	Men Winner	Time	Women Winner	Time
#1: Toronto	(Sweden) Anders Holmertz	49.26	(Sweden) Eva Nyberg	56.46
#2: Indianapolis	(United States) J. Harvey	50.41	(United States) Jenny Thompson	57.00
#3: Paris	(United Kingdom) Mike Fibbens	49.02	(East Germany) Manuela Stellmach	55.67
#4: East Berlin	(Sweden) Anders Holmertz	50.73	(East Germany) Manuela Stellmach	57.11
#5: Bonn	(United Kingdom) Mike Fibbens	48.95	(East Germany) Heike Friedrich	55.23
#6: Gothenburg	(Sweden) Tommy Werner	50.77	(East Germany) Regina Dittmann	57.88
#7: Venice	(United Kingdom) Mike Fibbens	49.94	(United States) Jill Sterkel	56.53
#8: London	(United Kingdom) Mike Fibbens	49.85	(East Germany) Manuela Stellmach	57.36

=== 200 freestyle ===
Meet	Men Winner	Time	Women Winner	Time
#1: Toronto	(Sweden) Anders Holmertz	1:46.02	(Canada) Jane Kerr	1:59.48
#2: Indianapolis	(Sweden) Anders Holmertz	1:50.19	(United States) Stacey Cassiday	2:02.87
#3: Paris	(East Germany) Andre Matzk	1:47.54	(East Germany) Manuela Stellmach	1:58.92
#4: East Berlin	(East Germany) Uwe Dassler	1:53.94	(East Germany) Heike Friedrich	2:01.36
#5: Bonn	(East Germany) Uwe Dassler	1:45.78	(West Germany) Stephanie Ortwig	1:57.96
#6: Gothenburg	(Sweden) Anders Holmertz	1:48.99	(East Germany) Regina Dittmann	2:04.15
#7: Venice	(Canada) Mike Woolhouse	1:49.07	(East Germany) Astrid Strauss	2:01.29
#8: London	(Sweden) Anders Holmertz	1:48.29	(East Germany) Heike Friedrich	2:02.13

=== 400 freestyle ===
Meet	Men Winner	Time	Women Winner	Time
#1: Toronto	(Sweden) Anders Holmertz	3:48.94	(Canada) Michelle Salee	4:13.24
#2: Indianapolis	(Canada) Turlough O'Hare	3:56.83	(United States) Stacey Cassiday	4:14.45
#3: Paris	(East Germany) Andre Matzk	3:48.29	(Norway) Irene Dalby	4:08.86
#4: East Berlin	(East Germany) Uwe Dassler	3:51.28	(East Germany) Grit Muller	4:12.55
#5: Bonn	(East Germany) Uwe Dassler	3:43.65	(West Germany) Stephanie Ortwig	4:06.92
#6: Gothenburg	(Canada) Turlough O'Hare	3:53.84	(East Germany) Peggy Buchse	4:18.39
#7: Venice	(East Germany) Gary Vandermeulen	3:46.32	(East Germany) Astrid Strauss	4:11.10
#8: London	(United Kingdom) Kevin Boyd	3:54.25	(Canada) Debbie Wurzburger	4:13.46

=== 1500/800 freestyle ===
Meet	Men Winner	Time	Women Winner	Time
#1: Toronto	(Italy) Fabio Calmasani	15:10.41	(Canada) Erin Holland	8:34.32
#2: Indianapolis	(United States) L. Jorgensen	15:29.21	(United States) Andrea Hayes	8:45.34
#3: Paris	(France) Christophe Bordeau	8:00.69	(Norway) Irene Dalby	8:31.74
#3: Paris	(East Germany) Rainer Henkel	15:05.41	(Belgium) Christelle Janssens	16:43.84
#4: East Berlin	(Australia) Glen Housman	15:34.91	(East Germany) Grit Muller	8:35.94
#5: Bonn	(East Germany) Uwe Dassler	7:45.88	(East Germany) Grit Muller	8:28.61
#6: Gothenburg	(Soviet Union) Alex Gatzov	15:37.54	(Italy) Cristina Sossi	8:50.22
#7: Venice	(Canada) Turlough O'Hare	7:51.57	(East Germany) Astrid Strauss	8:28.38
#8: London	(Canada) Turlough O'Hare	15:54.03	(Canada) Debbie Wurzburger	8:35.34

=== 50 Backstroke ===
Meet	Men Winner	Time	Women Winner	Time
#1: Toronto	(Hungary) Tamas Deutsh	26.94	(Hungary) Krisztina Egerszegi	29.39
#2: Indianapolis	N/A	N/A	N/A	N/A
#3: Paris	N/A	N/A	N/A	N/A
#4: East Berlin	N/A	N/A	N/A	N/A
#5: Bonn	(Canada) Mark Tewksbury	25.66	(United States) Anne Mahoney	29.50
#6: Gothenburg	(Canada) Mark Tewksbury	26.72	(East Germany) Anja Eichhorst	30.25
#7: Venice	N/A	N/A	N/A	N/A
#8: London	(United Kingdom) Carl Cockcroft	27.07	(East Germany) Birte Weigang	29.69

=== 100 Backstroke ===
Meet	Men Winner	Time	Women Winner	Time
#1: Toronto	(Hungary) Tamas Deutsh	56.79	(Hungary) Krisztina Egerszegi	1:01.55
#2: Indianapolis	(United States) D. Wheaherford	57.71	(Hungary) Krisztina Egerszegi	1:02.76
#3: Paris	(France) Franck Schott	56.02	(United States) Anne Mahoney	1:02.99
#4: East Berlin	(Soviet Union) Sergei Zabolotnov	56.97	(East Germany) Anja Eichhorst	1:04.25
#5: Bonn	(Canada) Mark Tewksbury	55.38	(East Germany) Birte Weigang	1:01.78
#6: Gothenburg	(Canada) Mark Tewksbury	57.43	(East Germany) Anja Eichhorst	1:04.61
#7: Venice	(Italy) Stefano Battistelli	56.66	(Canada) Anne-Marie Andersen	1:02.97
#8: London	(United Kingdom) Carl Cockcroft	59.48	(Canada) Anne-Marie Andersen	1:03.36

=== 200 Backstroke ===
Meet	Men Winner	Time	Women Winner	Time
#1: Toronto	(Hungary) Tamas Deutsh	2:02.79	(Hungary) Krisztina Egerszegi	2:12.13
#2: Indianapolis	(United States) D. Wheaherford	2:03.36	(Hungary) Krisztina Egerszegi	2:11.03
#3: Paris	(East Germany) Tino Weber	2:00.33	(United States) Beth Barr	2:13.11
#4: East Berlin	(Soviet Union) Sergei Zabolotnov	2:02.84	(East Germany) Marion Sperka	2:22.14
#5: Bonn	(Soviet Union) Vladimir Sekov	2:00.70	(United States) Beth Barr	2:13.99
#6: Gothenburg	N/A	N/A	N/A	N/A
#7: Venice	(Italy) Stefano Battistelli	1:59.48	(Canada) Anne-Marie Andersen	2:15.40
#8: London	(United Kingdom) Grant Robbins	2:02.66	(Canada) Anne-Marie Andersen	2:15.60

=== 50 Breaststroke ===
Meet	Men Winner	Time	Women Winner	Time
#1: Toronto	(China) Jiahong Chen	28.40	(Canada) Allison Higson	32.20
#2: Indianapolis	N/A	N/A	N/A	N/A
#3: Paris	N/A	N/A	N/A	N/A
#4: East Berlin	N/A	N/A	N/A	N/A
#5: Bonn	(Soviet Union) Dmitri Volkov	28.11	(United Kingdom) Suki Browndson	32.66
#6: Gothenburg	(Netherlands) Ron Dekker	29.33	(Bulgaria) Tanya Bogomilova	32.75
#7: Venice	N/A	N/A	N/A	N/A
#8: London	(United Kingdom) Gary Watson	28.79	(United Kingdom) Margater Hohmann	32.30

=== 100 Breaststroke ===
Meet	Men Winner	Time	Women Winner	Time
#1: Toronto	(China) Jiahong Chen	1:01.81	(United Kingdom) Suki Browndson	1:09.66
#2: Indianapolis	(Hungary) Karoly Güttler	1:03.81	(United Kingdom) Suki Browndson	1:11.17
#3: Paris	(East Germany) Christian Poswiat	1:01.08	(Canada) Guylame Cloutier	1:09.55
#4: East Berlin	(East Germany) Christian Poswiat	1:03.10	(East Germany) Susanne Bornike	1:10.80
#5: Bonn	(United Kingdom) Nick Gillingham	1:01.86	(East Germany) Susanne Bornike	1:07.96
#6: Gothenburg	(Canada) Jon Cleveland	1:04.59	(Bulgaria) Tanya Bogomilova	1:10.71
#7: Venice	(Canada) Victor Davis	1:00.59	(Canada) Allison Higson	1:09.26
#8: London	(United Kingdom) Nick Gillingham	1:03.10	(East Germany) Susanne Bornike	1:09.66

=== 200 Breaststroke ===
Meet	Men Winner	Time	Women Winner	Time
#1: Toronto	(Germany) Ingo Kreisinger	2:15.50	(Canada) Allison Higson	2:27.73
#2: Indianapolis	(United States) Mike Barrowman	2:15.72	(Canada) Allison Higson	2:28.73
#3: Paris	(East Germany) Christian Poswiat	2:14.93	(Italy) Annalisa Nisiro	2:33.83
#4: East Berlin	(Canada) Jon Cleveland	2:18.87	(East Germany) Susanne Bornike	2:29.09
#5: Bonn	(United Kingdom) Nick Gillingham	2:09.81	(East Germany) Susanne Bornike	2:22.92 WR
#6: Gothenburg	N/A	N/A	N/A	N/A
#7: Venice	(United Kingdom) Nick Gillingham	2:13.88	(Canada) Allison Higson	2:28.73
#8: London	(United Kingdom) Nick Gillingham	2:13.29	(East Germany) Susanne Bornike	2:27.03

=== 50 Butterfly ===
Meet	Men Winner	Time	Women Winner	Time
#1: Toronto	(Germany) Frank Henter	24.49	(Canada) Andrea Nugent	28.06
#2: Indianapolis	N/A	N/A	N/A	N/A
#3: Paris	N/A	N/A	N/A	N/A
#4: East Berlin	N/A	N/A	N/A	N/A
#5: Bonn	(East Germany) Nils Rudolph	24.31	(France) Jacqueline Delord	27.86
#6: Gothenburg	(Canada) Tom Ponting	24.90	(Netherlands) Conny Van Bentum	28.40
#7: Venice	N/A	N/A	N/A	N/A
#8: London	(France) Bruno Gutzeit	25.13	(East Germany) Birte Weigang	28.35

=== 100 Butterfly ===
Meet	Men Winner	Time	Women Winner	Time
#1: Toronto	(Canada) Tom Ponting	54.36	(United Kingdom) Madeleine Scarborough	1:02.10
#2: Indianapolis	(United States) J. Harvey & Bart Pippenger	54.47	(United States) R. Minthorn	1:02.24
#3: Paris	(United Kingdom) Michael Fibbens	54.00	(China) Quian Hong	1:00.28
#4: East Berlin	(East Germany) Tito Haase	55.44	(East Germany) Birte Weigang	1:01.54
#5: Bonn	(Canada) Tom Ponting	53.12	(East Germany) Birte Weigang	1:00.48
#6: Gothenburg	(Canada) Tom Ponting	54.50	(Netherlands) Conny Van Bentum	1:02.05
#7: Venice	(Canada) Tom Ponting	53.29	(United States) Jill Skertell	1:01.25
#8: London	(United Kingdom) Michael Fibbens	54.99	(East Germany) Birte Weigang	1:00.82

=== 200 Butterfly ===
Meet	Men Winner	Time	Women Winner	Time
#1: Toronto	(Canada) Jon Kelly	1:59.18	(Japan) Rie Shito	2:12.07
#2: Indianapolis	(United States) Bart Pippenger	2:00.13	(Japan) Rie Shito	2:13.66
#3: Paris	(Poland) Rafal Szukala	1:59.91	(Denmark) Mette Jacobsen	2:12.39
#4: East Berlin	(Germany) Martin Herrmann	2:02.25	(East Germany) Kathleen Nord	2:13.84
#5: Bonn	(Canada) Tom Ponting	1:56.50	(East Germany) Kathleen Nord	2:11.72
#6: Gothenburg	N/A	N/A	N/A	N/A
#7: Venice	(Canada) Tom Ponting	1:57.75	(East Germany) Kathleen Nord	2:12.34
#8: London	(United Kingdom) Tim Jones	2:01.03	(East Germany) Birte Weigang	2:10.86

=== 100 Individual Medley ===
Meet	Men Winner	Time	Women Winner	Time
#1: Toronto	(Sweden) Anders Petersson	57.26	(United Kingdom) Suki Browndson	1:03.41
#2: Indianapolis	N/A	N/A	N/A	N/A
#3: Paris	N/A	N/A	N/A	N/A
#4: East Berlin	N/A	N/A	N/A	N/A
#5: Bonn	(Germany) Josef Hladky	55.31	(East Germany) Daniela Hunger	1:03.24
#6: Gothenburg	N/A	N/A	N/A	N/A
#7: Venice	N/A	N/A	N/A	N/A
#8: London	(France) Bruno Gutzeit	57.54	(East Germany) Daniela Hunger	1:03.17

=== 200 Individual Medley ===
Meet	Men Winner	Time	Women Winner	Time
#1: Toronto	N/A	N/A	N/A	N/A
#2: Indianapolis	(United States) Ron Karnaugh	2:03.24	(Socialist Federal Republic of Yugoslavia) A. Petricevic	2:16.38
#3: Paris	(France) Frederic Lefevre	2:02.64	(China) Li Lin	2:15.20
#4: East Berlin	(East Germany) Patrick Khul	2:03.44	(East Germany) Daniela Hunger	2:17.27
#5: Bonn	(Germany) Josef Hladky	1:59.94	(East Germany) Daniela Hunger	2:13.77
#6: Gothenburg	(Germany) Josef Hladky	2:04.64	(Canada) Allison Higson	2:08.35
#7: Venice	(Germany) Peter Bermel	2:02.21	(Canada) Allison Higson	2:15.13
#8: London	(Canada) Jeff Sheehan	2:04.36	(Canada) Allison Higson	2:15.46

=== 400 Individual Medley ===
Meet	Men Winner	Time	Women Winner	Time
#1: Toronto	(Sweden) Jan Birdman	4:17.83	(United Kingdom) Suki Browndson	4:45.88
#2: Indianapolis	(United States) Matt Rankin	4:23.55	(Socialist Federal Republic of Yugoslavia) A. Petricevic	4:47.47
#3: Paris	(France) Frederic Lefevre	4:17.46	(China) Li Lin	4:43.94
#4: East Berlin	(East Germany) Patrick Khul	4:20.56	(East Germany) Daniela Hunger	4:49.11
#5: Bonn	(East Germany) Patrick Khul	4:13.79	(East Germany) Susanne Bornike	4:40.70
#6: Gothenburg	(Sweden) Jan Birdman	4:25.52	(East Germany) Corinna Meier	4:52.70
#7: Venice	(Italy) Luca Sacchi	4:19.92	(United Kingdom) Suki Browndson	4:46.60
#8: London	(United Kingdom) Paul Brew	4:19.84	(United Kingdom) Suki Browndson	4:50.84
