= Swimming at the 1988 Summer Olympics – Women's 100 metre breaststroke =

Women's 100 metre breaststroke at the Games of the XXIV Olympiad
- Venue: Jamsil Indoor Swimming Pool
- Date: 23 September 1988 (heats & finals)
- Competitors: 44 from 28 nations
- Winning time: 1:07.95 OR

Medalists
1st place, gold medalist(s)		Tanya Dangalakova	Bulgaria
2nd place, silver medalist(s)		Antoaneta Frenkeva	Bulgaria
3rd place, bronze medalist(s)		Silke Hörner	East Germany

The women's 100 metre breaststroke event at the 1988 Summer Olympics took place on 23 September at the Jamsil Indoor Swimming Pool in Seoul, South Korea.

== Records ==
Prior to this competition, the existing world and Olympic records were as follows.

World record	Silke Hörner (GDR)	1:07.91	Strasbourg, France	21 August 1987
Olympic record	Petra van Staveren (NED)	1:09.88	Los Angeles, United States	2 August 1984

The following records were established during the competition:

Date	Round	Name	Nationality	Time	Record
23 September	Heat 4	Tanya Dangalakova	Bulgaria	1:08.35	OR
23 September	Heat 5	Silke Hörner	East Germany	1:08.35	=OR
23 September	Final A	Tanya Dangalakova	Bulgaria	1:07.95	OR

== Results ==
=== Heats ===
Rule: The eight fastest swimmers advance to final A (Q), while the next eight to final B (q).

Rank	Heat	Name	Nationality	Time	Notes
1	4	Tanya Dangalakova	Bulgaria	1:08.35	Q, OR
1	6	Silke Hörner	East Germany	1:08.35	Q, OR
3	6	Allison Higson	Canada	1:08.39	Q
4	4	Yelena Volkova	Soviet Union	1:09.86	Q
5	5	Antoaneta Frenkeva	Bulgaria	1:10.09	Q
6	4	Tracey McFarlane	United States	1:10.59	Q
7	5	Annett Rex	East Germany	1:10.61	Q
8	5	Huang Xiaomin	China	1:10.78	Q
9	5	Svetlana Kuzmina	Soviet Union	1:10.83	q
10	5	Keltie Duggan	Canada	1:10.95	q
11	6	Ingrid Lempereur	Belgium	1:11.00	q, NR
12	6	Susan Johnson	United States	1:11.08	q
13	6	Gabriella Csépe	Hungary	1:11.10	q
14	5	Manuela Dalla Valle	Italy	1:11.25	q
15	6	Lara Hooiveld	Australia	1:11.40	q
16	4	Suki Brownsdon	Great Britain	1:11.66	q
17	5	Linda Moes	Netherlands	1:11.84	
18	3	Park Sung-won	South Korea	1:12.32	
19	6	Dorota Chylak	Poland	1:12.38	
20	5	Margaret Hohmann	Great Britain	1:12.67	
21	3	Brigitte Becue	Belgium	1:12.90	
22	4	Britta Dahm	West Germany	1:12.98	
23	3	Ragnheiður Runólfsdóttir	Iceland	1:13.01	
24	4	Pascaline Louvrier	France	1:13.23	
25	3	Yoshie Nishioka	Japan	1:13.36	
26	3	Virginie Bojaryn	France	1:13.55	
27	4	Chen Huiling	China	1:13.65	
28	2	Karen Horning	Peru	1:14.03	
29	3	Nancy Kemp-Arendt	Luxembourg	1:14.99	
30	3	Patricia Brülhart	Switzerland	1:15.00	
31	3	Kornelia Stawicka	Poland	1:15.41	
32	2	Carwai Seto	Chinese Taipei	1:15.47	
33	2	Alicia María Boscatto	Argentina	1:15.67	
34	6	Hiroko Nagasaki	Japan	1:16.63	
35	2	Sigrid Niehaus	Costa Rica	1:16.65	
36	1	Montserrat Hidalgo	Costa Rica	1:18.42	
37	2	Valentina Aracil	Argentina	1:19.60	
38	2	Dipika Chanmugam	Sri Lanka	1:20.18	
39	2	Kimberly Chen	Chinese Taipei	1:20.95	
40	1	Katerine Moreno	Bolivia	1:22.52	
41	1	Ana Martins	Angola	1:24.01	
42	1	Nádia Cruz	Angola	1:24.46	
	2	Annemarie Munk	Hong Kong	DNS	
	4	Heike Esser	West Germany	DNS	

=== Finals ===
==== Final B ====
Rank	Lane	Name	Nationality	Time	Notes
9	4	Svetlana Kuzmina	Soviet Union	1:10.42	
10	5	Keltie Duggan	Canada	1:10.58	
11	3	Ingrid Lempereur	Belgium	1:10.86	NR
12	7	Manuela Dalla Valle	Italy	1:10.95	
13	6	Susan Johnson	United States	1:11.08	
14	2	Gabriella Csépe	Hungary	1:11.24	
15	1	Lara Hooiveld	Australia	1:11.26	
16	8	Suki Brownsdon	Great Britain	1:11.88	

==== Final A ====
Rank	Lane	Name	Nationality	Time	Notes
1st place, gold medalist(s)	4	Tanya Dangalakova	Bulgaria	1:07.95	OR
2nd place, silver medalist(s)	2	Antoaneta Frenkeva	Bulgaria	1:08.74	
3rd place, bronze medalist(s)	5	Silke Hörner	East Germany	1:08.83	
4	3	Allison Higson	Canada	1:08.86	
5	6	Yelena Volkova	Soviet Union	1:09.24	
6	7	Tracey McFarlane	United States	1:09.60	
7	8	Huang Xiaomin	China	1:10.53	
8	1	Annett Rex	East Germany	1:10.67	
