= Swimming at the 1988 Summer Olympics =

Swimming at the Games of the XXIV Olympiad
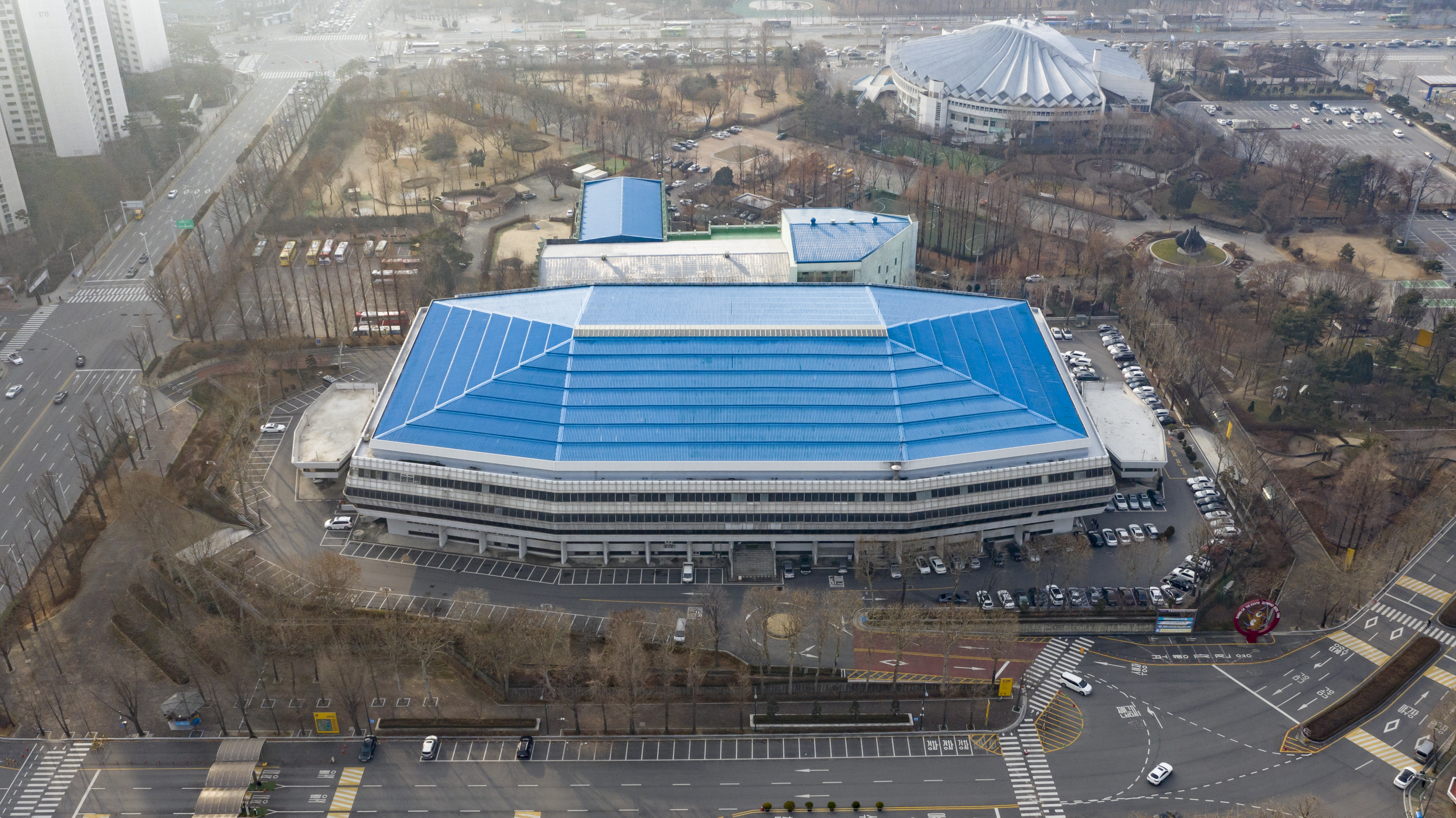
- Venue: Jamsil Indoor Swimming Pool
- Dates: 18 – 25 September 1988
- No. of events: 31

The 1988 Summer Olympics took place in Seoul, South Korea. The swimming competition, held from September 18 to September 25, was notable for the seven medals, including five golds, won by Matt Biondi, the six golds won by Kristin Otto, and the three individual golds won by Janet Evans. 633 participants from 77 countries were competing.

== Medal table ==
Rank	Nation	Gold	Silver	Bronze	Total
1	East Germany	11	8	9	28
2	United States	8	6	4	18
3	Hungary	4	2	0	6
4	Soviet Union	2	2	5	9
5	Australia	1	1	1	3
5	Bulgaria	1	1	1	3
5	Great Britain	1	1	1	3
5	West Germany	1	1	1	3
9	Japan	1	0	0	1
9	Suriname	1	0	0	1
11	China	0	3	1	4
12	Canada	0	1	1	2
12	Romania	0	1	1	2
14	Costa Rica	0	1	0	1
14	Denmark	0	1	0	1
14	Netherlands	0	1	0	1
14	Sweden	0	1	0	1
18	France	0	0	2	2
18	New Zealand	0	0	2	2
20	Italy	0	0	1	1
20	Poland	0	0	1	1
20	Spain	0	0	1	1
Totals (22 entries)		31	31	32	94

== Events ==
The swimming program for 1988 included two new events, the men's and women's 50 m freestyle, bringing the total number of events to 31.

The following events were contested:

- Freestyle: 50 m, 100 m, 200 m, 400 m, 800 m (women), 1500 m (men)
- Backstroke: 100 m, 200 m
- Breaststroke: 100 m, 200 m
- Butterfly: 100 m, 200 m
- Individual Medley: 200 m, 400 m
- Relay: 4 × 100 m free, 4 × 200 m free (men); 4 × 100 m medley

== Competition schedule ==
All dates are in 1988.

date	Morning session	Afternoon session
Sept.18	no competition	women's 100 freestyle (prelims) men's 100 breaststroke (prelims) women's 400 I.M. (prelims) men's 200 freestyle (prelims)
Sept.19	women's 100 freestyle (finals) men's 100 breaststroke (finals) women's 400 I.M. (finals) men's 200 freestyle (finals)	
Sept.20	men's 100 butterfly (prelims) women's 200 freestyle (prelims) men's 400 I.M. (prelims) women's 200 breaststroke (prelims) men's 4 × 200 Freestyle Relay (prelims)	
Sept.21		men's 100 butterfly (finals) women's 200 freestyle (finals) men's 400 I.M. (finals) women's 200 breaststroke (finals) men's 4 × 200 Freestyle Relay (finals)
Sept.22	women's 400 freestyle (prelims) men's 100 freestyle (prelims) women's 100 backstroke (prelims) men's 200 backstroke (prelims) women's 4 × 100 Free Relay	women's 400 freestyle (finals) men's 100 freestyle (finals) women's 100 backstroke (finals) men's 200 backstroke (finals) women's 4 × 100 Freestyle Relay (finals)
Sept.23	men's 400 freestyle (prelims) women's 100 butterfly (prelims) men's 200 breaststroke (prelims) women's 100 breaststroke (prelims) men's 4 × 100 Freestyle Relay (prelims) women's 800 freestyle (prelims)	men's 400 freestyle (final) women's 100 butterfly (finals) men's 200 breaststroke (finals) women's 100 breaststroke (finals) men's 4 × 100 Freestyle Relay (finals)
Sept.24	men's 200 butterfly (prelims) women's 200 I.M. (prelims) men's 50 freestyle (prelims) men's 100 backstroke (prelims) women's 4 × 100 Medley Relay (prelims) men's 1500 freestyle (prelims)	women's 200 I.M. (finals) men's 200 butterfly (finals) men's 50 freestyle (finals) women's 800 freestyle (finals) men's 100 backstroke (finals) women's 4 × 100 medley relay (finals)
Sept.25	women's 200 butterfly (prelims) men's 200 I.M. (prelims) women's 50 freestyle (prelims) men's 4 × 100 medley relay (prelims) women's 200 backstroke (prelims)	men's 200 I.M. (finals) women's 200 butterfly (finals) women's 50 freestyle (finals) men's 1500 freestyle (finals) women's 200 backstroke (finals) men's 4 × 100 medley relay (finals)

== Medal summary ==
=== Men’s events ===
Games	Gold		Silver		Bronze	
50 m freestyle	Matt Biondi; United States	22.14 WR	Tom Jager; United States	22.36	Gennadiy Prigoda; Soviet Union	22.71
100 m freestyle	Matt Biondi; United States	48.63 OR	Chris Jacobs; United States	49.08	Stéphan Caron; France	49.62
200 m freestyle	Duncan Armstrong; Australia	1:47.25 WR	Anders Holmertz; Sweden	1:47.89	Matt Biondi; United States	1:47.99
400 m freestyle	Uwe Dassler; East Germany	3:46.95 WR	Duncan Armstrong; Australia	3:47.15 OC	Artur Wojdat; Poland	3:47.34
1500 m freestyle	Vladimir Salnikov; Soviet Union	15:00.40	Stefan Pfeiffer; West Germany	15:02.69	Uwe Dassler; East Germany	15:06.15
100 m backstroke	Daichi Suzuki; Japan	55.05 AS	David Berkoff; United States	55.18	Igor Polyansky; Soviet Union	55.20
200 m backstroke	Igor Polyansky; Soviet Union	1:59.37	Frank Baltrusch; East Germany	1:59.60	Paul Kingsman; New Zealand	2:00.48 NR
100 m breaststroke	Adrian Moorhouse; Great Britain	1:02.04 NR	Károly Güttler; Hungary	1:02.05	Dmitry Volkov; Soviet Union	1:02.20
200 m breaststroke	József Szabó; Hungary	2:13.52 ER	Nick Gillingham; Great Britain	2:14.12	Sergio López Miró; Spain	2:15.21 NR
100 m butterfly	Anthony Nesty; Suriname	53.00; OR	Matt Biondi; United States	53.01	Andy Jameson; Great Britain	53.30
200 m butterfly	Michael Gross; West Germany	1:56.94 OR	Benny Nielsen; Denmark	1:58.24 NR	Anthony Mosse; New Zealand	1:58.28
200 m individual medley	Tamás Darnyi; Hungary	2:00.17 WR	Patrick Kühl; East Germany	2:01.61	Vadim Yaroshchuk; Soviet Union	2:02.40
400 m individual medley	Tamás Darnyi; Hungary	4:14.75 WR	David Wharton; United States	4:17.36	Stefano Battistelli; Italy	4:18.01
4 × 100 m freestyle relay	United States; Chris Jacobs; Troy Dalbey; Tom Jager; Matt Biondi; Doug Gjertsen*; Brent Lang*; Shaun Jordan*	3:16.53 WR	Soviet Union; Gennadiy Prigoda; Yuri Bashkatov; Nikolai Yevseyev; Vladimir Tkachenko; Raimundas Mažuolis*; Oleksiy Boryslavskiy*	3:18.33 ER	East Germany; Dirk Richter; Thomas Flemming; Lars Hinneburg; Steffen Zesner	3:19.82
4 × 200 m freestyle relay	United States; Troy Dalbey; Matt Cetlinski; Doug Gjertsen; Matt Biondi; Craig Oppel*; Dan Jorgensen*	7:12.51 WR	East Germany; Uwe Daßler; Sven Lodziewski; Thomas Flemming; Steffen Zesner; Lars Hinneburg*	7:13.68	West Germany; Erik Hochstein; Thomas Fahrner; Rainer Henkel; Michael Gross; Peter Sitt*; Stefan Pfeiffer*	7:14.35
4 × 100 m medley relay	United States; David Berkoff; Richard Schroeder; Matt Biondi; Chris Jacobs; Jay Mortenson*; Tom Jager*	3:36.93 WR	Canada; Mark Tewksbury; Victor Davis; Tom Ponting; Sandy Goss	3:39.28	Soviet Union; Igor Polyansky; Dmitry Volkov; Vadim Yaroshchuk; Gennadiy Prigoda; Sergey Zabolotnov*; Valeriy Lozik*; Konstantin Petrov*; Nikolay Yevseyev*	3:39.96

* Swimmers who participated in the heats only and received medals.

=== Women’s events ===
Games	Gold		Silver		Bronze	
50 m freestyle	Kristin Otto; East Germany	25.49 (OR)	Yang Wenyi; China	25.64	Jill Sterkel; United States	25.71
50 m freestyle	Kristin Otto; East Germany	25.49 (OR)	Yang Wenyi; China	25.64	Katrin Meissner; East Germany	25.71
100 m freestyle	Kristin Otto; East Germany	54.93	Zhuang Yong; China	55.47	Catherine Plewinski; France	55.49
200 m freestyle	Heike Friedrich; East Germany	1:57.65 (OR)	Silvia Poll; Costa Rica	1:58.67	Manuela Stellmach; East Germany	1:59.01
400 m freestyle	Janet Evans; United States	4:03.85 (WR)	Heike Friedrich; East Germany	4:05.94	Anke Möhring; East Germany	4:06.62
800 m freestyle	Janet Evans; United States	8:20.20 (OR)	Astrid Strauß; East Germany	8:22.09	Julie McDonald; Australia	8:22.93
100 m backstroke	Kristin Otto; East Germany	1:00.89	Krisztina Egerszegi; Hungary	1:01.56	Cornelia Sirch; East Germany	1:01.57
200 m backstroke	Krisztina Egerszegi; Hungary	2:09.29 (OR)	Katrin Zimmermann; East Germany	2:10.61	Cornelia Sirch; East Germany	2:11.45
100 m breaststroke	Tanya Dangalakova; Bulgaria	1:07.95 (OR)	Antoaneta Frenkeva; Bulgaria	1:08.74	Silke Hörner; East Germany	1:08.83
200 m breaststroke	Silke Hörner; East Germany	2:26.71 (WR)	Huang Xiaomin; China	2:27.49	Antoaneta Frenkeva; Bulgaria	2:28.34
100 m butterfly	Kristin Otto; East Germany	59.00 (OR)	Birte Weigang; East Germany	59.45	Hong Qian; China	59.52
200 m butterfly	Kathleen Nord; East Germany	2:09.51	Birte Weigang; East Germany	2:09.91	Mary T. Meagher; United States	2:10.80
200 m individual medley	Daniela Hunger; East Germany	2:12.59 (OR)	Yelena Dendeberova; Soviet Union	2:13.31	Noemi Lung; Romania	2:14.85
400 m individual medley	Janet Evans; United States	4:37.76	Noemi Lung; Romania	4:39.46	Daniela Hunger; East Germany	4:39.76
4 × 100 m freestyle relay	East Germany; Kristin Otto; Katrin Meissner; Daniela Hunger; Manuela Stellmach; Sabina Schulze*; Heike Friedrich*	3:40.63 OR	Netherlands; Marianne Muis; Mildred Muis; Conny van Bentum; Karin Brienesse; Diana van der Plaats*	3:43.39	United States; Mary Wayte; Mitzi Kremer; Laura Walker; Dara Torres; Paige Zemina*; Jill Sterkel*	3:44.25
4 × 100 m medley relay	East Germany; Kristin Otto; Silke Hörner; Birte Weigang; Katrin Meissner; Cornelia Sirch*; Manuela Stellmach*	4:03.74 OR	United States; Beth Barr; Tracey McFarlane; Janel Jorgensen; Mary Wayte; Betsy Mitchell*; Mary T. Meagher*; Dara Torres*	4:07.90	Canada; Lori Melien; Allison Higson; Jane Kerr; Andrea Nugent; Keltie Duggan*; Patricia Noall*	4:10.49

* Swimmers who participated in the heats only and received medals.

== Participating nations ==
633 swimmers from 77 nations competed.

- Angola (8)
- Argentina (2)
- Australia (25)
- Austria (6)
- Bahamas (1)
- Bangladesh (2)
- Barbados (1)
- Belgium (7)
- Bermuda (1)
- Bolivia (1)
- Brazil (15)
- Bulgaria (8)
- Canada (31)
- China (24)
- Chinese Taipei (8)
- Colombia (1)
- Costa Rica (8)
- Czechoslovakia (6)
- Denmark (15)
- East Germany (26)
- Egypt (5)
- Fiji (5)
- Finland (1)
- France (25)
- Great Britain (38)
- Greece (4)
- Guam (4)
- Guatemala (1)
- Honduras (3)
- Hong Kong (10)
- Hungary (13)
- Iceland (6)
- India (1)
- Indonesia (2)
- Ireland (5)
- Israel (1)
- Italy (21)
- Japan (23)
- Kuwait (2)
- Lebanon (4)
- Luxembourg (2)
- Malaysia (2)
- Mexico (10)
- Mozambique (2)
- Netherlands (11)
- Netherlands Antilles (1)
- Norway (2)
- New Zealand (7)
- Panama (1)
- Peru (2)
- Philippines (4)
- Poland (5)
- Portugal (12)
- Puerto Rico (3)
- Romania (5)
- San Marino (2)
- Senegal (2)
- Singapore (5)
- South Korea (15)
- Soviet Union (27)
- Spain (11)
- Sri Lanka (2)
- Suriname (1)
- Swaziland (2)
- Sweden (18)
- Switzerland (10)
- Trinidad and Tobago (1)
- Tunisia (1)
- Turkey (2)
- United Arab Emirates (6)
- United States (44)
- Virgin Islands (6)
- Uruguay (1)
- Vietnam (2)
- West Germany (29)
- Yugoslavia (3)
- Zimbabwe (4)
