= Swimming at the 1987 European Aquatics Championships – Women's 100 metre breaststroke =

The women's 100 breaststroke at the 1987 European Championships was held on August 21, 1987, in Strasbourg, France.

== Finals ==
Place	Name	Nationality	Time	Note
1	Silke Hörner	East Germany	1:07.91	WR
2	Manuela Dalla Valle	Italy	1:09.55	
3	Sylvia Gerasch	East Germany	1:09.83	
4	Pascaline Louvrier	France	1:10.14	
5	Susannah Brownsdon	Great Britain	1:10.65	
6	Linda Moes	Netherlands	1:10.85	
7	Yelena Volkova	Soviet Union	1:11.04	
8	Britta Dahm	West Germany	1:11.21	
