= Keltie Duggan =

Canadian swimmer (born 1970)

Personal information
- Full name: Keltie Mayken Duggan
- National team: Canada
- Born: September 7, 1970 (age 55) Edmonton, Alberta, Canada
- Height: 1.70 m (5 ft 7 in)
- Weight: 63 kg (139 lb)

Sport
- Sport: Swimming
- Strokes: Breaststroke
- Club: Edmonton Keyano Swim Club
Medal record
Women's swimming
Representing Canada
Olympic Games
Bronze medal – third place	1988 Seoul	4x100 m medley
Pan Pacific Championships
Gold medal – first place	1989 Tokyo	100m breaststroke
Pan American Games
Gold medal – first place	1987 Indianapolis	100m breaststroke

Keltie Mayken Duggan (born September 7, 1970) is a former international breaststroke swimmer from Canada, who competed for her native country at the 1988 Summer Olympics in Seoul, South Korea. There she won the bronze medal in the women's 4x100-metre medley relay, although she swam in the preliminary heat. The team for the final was formed by Lori Melien, Allison Higson, Jane Kerr and Andrea Nugent.

== See also ==
- List of Olympic medalists in swimming (women)
