= Patricia Noall =

Canadian swimmer

Personal information
- Full name: Patricia Noall
- National team: Canada
- Born: June 2, 1970 (age 56) Pointe-Claire, Quebec, Canada
- Height: 1.73 m (5 ft 8 in)
- Weight: 60 kg (132 lb)

Sport
- Sport: Swimming
- Strokes: Freestyle
- Club: CNMN
- College team: University of Montreal
Medal record
Women's swimming
Representing Canada
Olympic Games
Bronze medal – third place	1988 Seoul	4×100m medley
Pan Pacific Championships
Gold medal – first place	1989 Tokyo	200 m freestyle
Commonwealth Games
Gold medal – first place	1986 Edinburgh	4×100 m freestyle
Silver medal – second place	1990 Auckland	4×100 m freestyle
Bronze medal – third place	1986 Edinburgh	4×200 m freestyle
Bronze medal – third place	1990 Auckland	100 m freestyle
Bronze medal – third place	1990 Auckland	200 m freestyle
Bronze medal – third place	1990 Auckland	4×100 m medley
Universiade
Gold medal – first place	1991 Sheffield	400 m freestyle
Silver medal – second place	1991 Sheffield	200 m freestyle
Silver medal – second place	1991 Sheffield	4×100 m medley
Silver medal – second place	1993 Buffalo	4×100 m freestyle
Bronze medal – third place	1991 Sheffield	400 m medley
Bronze medal – third place	1991 Sheffield	4×200 m freestyle

Patricia Noall (born June 2, 1970) is a former competition swimmer who represented Canada in international swimming championships during the 1980s and early 1990s, competing in freestyle events. She won 14 medals in international competition, including the Olympics, Pan Pacific Championships, Commonwealth Games, and World University Games.

Noall swam in the 1988 Summer Olympics in Seoul, South Korea. There she earned bronze medal by swimming for the third-place Canadian team in the preliminary heats of the women's 4x100-metre medley relay, although she just swam. The Canadian team for the final was formed by Lori Melien, Allison Higson, Jane Kerr and Andrea Nugent.

== See also ==
- List of Olympic medalists in swimming (women)
- List of Commonwealth Games medallists in swimming (women)
