= Antoaneta Frenkeva =

Bulgarian swimmer (born 1971)

Medal record

Women's swimming

Representing Bulgaria

Olympic Games
Silver medal – second place	1988 Seoul	100 m breaststroke
Bronze medal – third place	1988 Seoul	200 m breaststroke

Antoaneta Frenkeva (Bulgarian: Антоанета Френкева, born 24 August 1971) is a former breaststroke swimmer from Bulgaria, who won the silver medal in the 100 m breaststroke at the 1988 Summer Olympics in Seoul, South Korea, just behind her teammate Tanya Dangalakova. In the same tournament the seventeen-year-old captured the bronze in the 200 m breaststroke.
