= Tricia Duncan =

U.S. Virgin Islands swimmer (born 1973)

Personal information
- Full name: Patricia Duncan
- Nationality: American (Virgin Islands)
- Born: August 21, 1973 (age 52) Saint Croix, US Virgin Islands

Sport
- Sport: Swimming
- Strokes: Backstroke
- College team: Swarthmore College

Patricia Duncan (born August 21, 1973) is a former swimmer for the U.S. Virgin Islands who participated in the backstroke at the 1988 Summer Olympics. Duncan finished 34th in the 100 m backstroke and 30th in 200 m backstroke. She is the older sister of NBA basketball player Tim Duncan. Duncan attended Swarthmore College.
