= 1989 Pan Pacific Swimming Championships =

International swimming competition

- Host city: Tokyo, Japan
- Date: August 17–20, 1989
- Venue: Yoyogi National Olympic Pool

The third edition of the Pan Pacific Swimming Championships, a long course (50 m) event, was held in 1989 in Tokyo, Japan at the Yoyogi National Olympic Pool from August 17–20.

== Results ==
=== Men's events ===
Event	Gold		Silver		Bronze	
50 m freestyle	Tom Jager (USA)	22.12 WR	Andrew Baildon (AUS)	22.54	Steve Crocker (USA)	22.78
100 m freestyle	Brent Lang (USA)	49.56	Andrew Baildon (AUS)	50.03	Doug Gjertsen (USA)	50.11
200 m freestyle	Doug Gjertsen (USA)	1:49.09	Jon Olsen (USA)	1:49.47	Turlough O'Hare (CAN)	1:50.23
400 m freestyle	Turlough O'Hare (CAN)	3:52.89	Dan Jorgensen (USA)	3:53.85	Paul Robinson (USA)	3:55.04
800 m freestyle	Michael Bruce McKenzie (AUS)	7:58.99	Dan Jorgensen (USA)	8:01.29	Christopher Bowie (CAN)	8:02.18
1500 m freestyle	Glen Housman (AUS)	15:06.00	Lars Jorgensen (USA)	15:14.45	Michael Bruce McKenzie (AUS)	15:21.52
100 m backstroke	Jeff Rouse (USA)	56.34	Scot Johnson (USA)	56.52	Mark Tewksbury (CAN)	56.65
200 m backstroke	Dan Veatch (USA)	2:01.27	Gary Anderson (CAN)	2:02.34	Paul Kingsman (NZL)	2:03.14
100 m breaststroke	Rich Korhammer (USA)	1:02.95	Richard Schroeder (USA)	1:03.09	Chen Jianhong (CHN)	1:03.19
200 m breaststroke	Mike Barrowman (USA)	2:12.89 WR	Nelson Diebel (USA)	2:14.94	Jonathan Cleveland (CAN)	2:15.76
100 m butterfly	Anthony Nesty (SUR)	53.80	Wade King (USA)	53.86	Mark Henderson (USA)	54.13
200 m butterfly	Melvin Stewart (USA)	1:59.40	David Wharton (USA)	1:59.56	Anthony Mosse (NZL)	2:00.03
200 m individual medley	David Wharton (USA)	2:00.11 WR	Ron Karnaugh (USA)	2:02.83	Gary Anderson (CAN)	2:03.19
400 m individual medley	David Wharton (USA)	4:16.14	Eric Namesnik (USA)	4:17.02	Raymond Brown (CAN)	4:23.61
4×100 m freestyle relay	United States; Brent Lang (49.48); Jon Olsen (49.78); Doug Gjertsen (48.97); Tom Jager (49.52)	3:17.75	Australia; Thomas Stachewicz (51.1); Ian Van der Wal (51.19); Gary Lord (50.51); Andrew Baildon (49.54)	3:22.39	Canada; S. Vander Meulen (51.61); Stepjane Hebert (50.60); Mike Woolhouse (50.69); Darren Ward (51.33)	3:24.23
4×200 m freestyle relay	United States; Melvin Stewart (1:50.51); Dan Jorgensen (1:50.29); Jon Olsen (1:51.02); Doug Gjertsen (1:49.05)	7:20.87	Canada; G.Vander Meulen (1:51.69); Eddie Patenti (1:51.66); Darren Ward (1:51.69); Turlough o'Hare (1:50.09)	7:25.13	Australia; Martin Roberts (1:51.48); Justin Lemberg (1:51.82); Gary Lord (1:51.76); Thomas Stachewicz (1:50.76)	7:25.56
4×100 m medley relay	United States; Jeff Rouse (55.65); Rich Korhammer (1:01.78); Wade King (53.23); Brent Lang (48.61)	3:39.27	Canada; Mark Tewksbury (56.52); Jon Cleveland (1:01.69); Stephan Hebert (54.55); Mike Woolhouse (50.96)	3:43.42	Australia; Thomas Stachewicz (58.17); Phil Rogers (1:03.63); Justin Cooper (55.55); Andrew Baildon (49.40)	3:46.75

=== Women's events ===
Event	Gold		Silver		Bronze	
50 m freestyle	Jenny Thompson (USA)	25.85	Wenyi Yang (CHN)	25.95	Leigh Ann Fetter (USA)	25.96
100 m freestyle	Yong Zhuang (CHN)	55.68	Jenny Thompson (USA)	55.84	Nicole Haislett (USA)	55.99
200 m freestyle	Patricia Noall (CAN)	2:00.87	Mitzi Kremer (USA)	2:01.18	Yong Zhuang (CHN)	2:01.44
400 m freestyle	Janet Evans (USA)	4:04.53	Jane Skillman (USA)	4:11.46	Janelle Elford (AUS)	4:12.57
800 m freestyle	Janet Evans (USA)	8:16.22 WR	Janelle Elford (AUS)	8:31.16	Julie Kole (USA)	8:32.56
1500 m freestyle	Janelle Elford (AUS)	16:10.58	Julie Kole (USA)	16:28.25	Julie McDonald (AUS)	16:35.82
100 m backstroke	Lea Loveless (USA)	1:02.69	Nicole Livingstone (AUS)	1:03.52	Anne Mahoney (USA)	1:03.52
200 m backstroke	Dede Trimble (USA)	2:13.76	Anna Simcic (NZL)	2:14.21	Nicole Livingstone (AUS)	2:14.22
100 m breaststroke	Keltie Duggan (CAN)	1:09.79	Tracey McFarlane (USA)	1:09.81	Mary Ellen Blanchard (USA)	1:11.08
200 m breaststroke	Mary Ellen Blanchard (USA)	2:32.02	Nathalie Giguere (CAN)	2:32.12	Tracey McFarlane (USA)	2:32.13
100 m butterfly	Hong Qian (CHN)	1:00.45	Xiaohong Wang (CHN)	1:00.81	Jenna Johnson (USA)	1:01.01
200 m butterfly	Rie Shito (JPN)	2:11.29	Julie Gorman (USA)	2:11.45	Xiaohong Wang (CHN)	2:11.55
200 m individual medley	Lin Li (CHN)	2:14.69	Summer Sanders (USA)	2:16.09	Michelle Griglione (USA)	2:16.77
400 m individual medley	Janet Evans (USA)	4:39.38	Lin Li (CHN)	4:45.69	Donna Procter (AUS)	4:45.99
4×100 m freestyle relay	United States; Jenny Thompson; Julie Cooper; Carrie Steinseifer; Nicole Haislett	3:43.63	Canada	3:47.80	China	3:47.97
4×200 m freestyle relay	United States; Mitzi Kremer; Stacy Cassiday; Janet Evans; Julie Kole	8:03.33	Japan	8:14.83	Canada	8:16.29
4×100 m medley relay	United States; Lea Loveless; Tracey McFarlane; Jenna Johnson; Leigh Ann Fetter	4:09.93	Australia	4:11.54	China	4:11.54

== Medal table ==
Rank	Nation	Gold	Silver	Bronze	Total
1	United States (USA)	23	18	12	53
2	Australia (AUS)	3	6	7	16
3	Canada (CAN)	3	5	8	16
4	China (CHN)	3	3	5	11
5	Japan (JPN)	1	1	0	2
6	Suriname (SUR)	1	0	0	1
7	New Zealand (NZL)	0	1	2	3
Totals (7 entries)		34	34	34	102
