= Birte Weigang =

East German swimmer (born 1968)

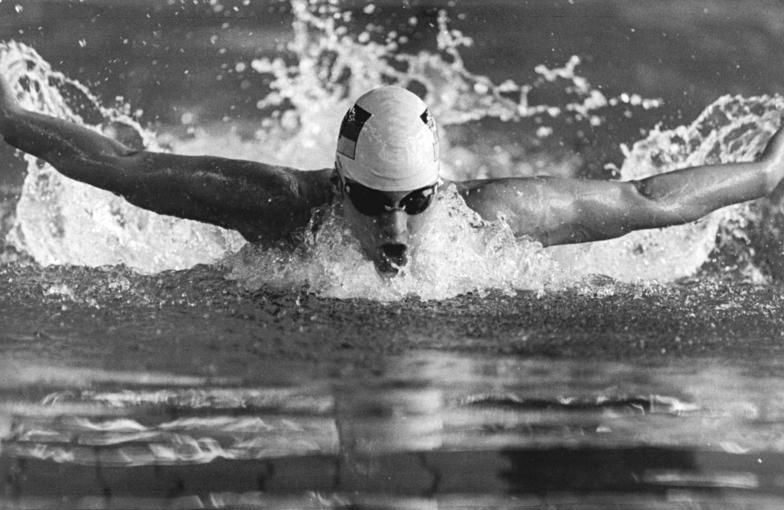
- Weigang in 1988

Personal information
- Full name: Birte Weigang
- Nationality: German
- Born: 31 January 1968 (age 58) Leipzig, Saxony, East Germany

Sport
- Sport: Swimming
- Strokes: Backstroke, medley, butterfly
Medal record
Women's swimming
Representing East Germany
Olympic Games
Gold medal – first place	1988 Seoul	4×100 m medley
Silver medal – second place	1988 Seoul	100 m butterfly
Silver medal – second place	1988 Seoul	200 m butterfly
World Championships (LC)
Bronze medal – third place	1986 Madrid	200 m butterfly
European Championships (LC)
Gold medal – first place	1985 Sofia	100 m backstroke
Gold medal – first place	1985 Sofia	4×100 m medley
Gold medal – first place	1987 Strasbourg	4×100 m medley
Silver medal – second place	1985 Sofia	100 m butterfly
Silver medal – second place	1987 Strasbourg	100 m butterfly
Silver medal – second place	1987 Strasbourg	200 m butterfly

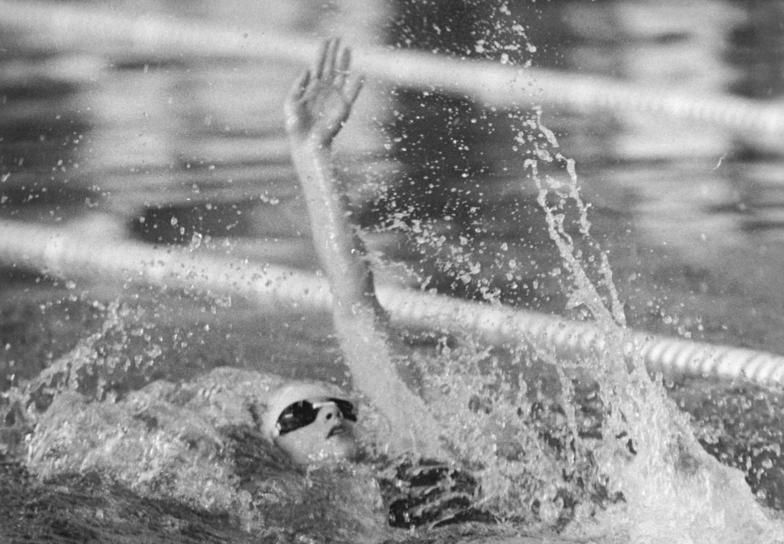
29th NOK competition in Berlin (1983)

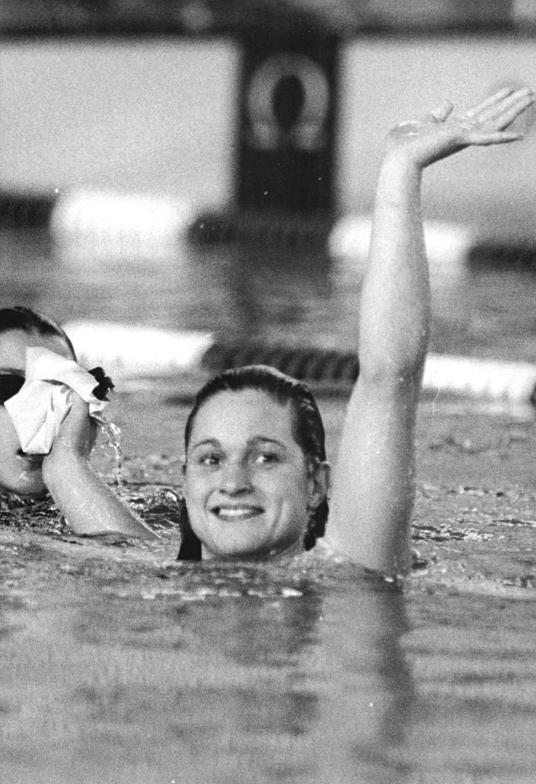
Birte Weigang (1987)

Birte Weigang (born 31 January 1968 in Leipzig) is a former butterfly and backstroke swimmer from East Germany, who won three medals at the 1988 Summer Olympics in Seoul, South Korea. The twenty-year-old triumphed with the DDR women's relay team in the 4×100 m medley together with her teammates Kristin Otto, Silke Hörner and Katrin Meissner, and finished second in both the 100 m and the 200 m butterfly. She won a gold medal in 1987 at the European Championships, in the women's 4×100 m medley.

She is a daughter of the legendary Horst Weigang, once a footballer of the year for East Germany. She started her career in SC Turbine Erfurt. Weigang celebrated her biggest success in 1985, when at the age of 17 she became a European backstroke champion. Later she concentrated on butterfly style and won a silver medal at the World Championships in 1986, which were held in Madrid.

After Weigang gave up her swimming career, she became a coach.
