= Annett Rex =

German swimmer

Personal information
- Born: 13 December 1969 (age 56) Berlin, Germany

Sport
- Sport: Swimming

Annett Rex (born 13 December 1969) is a German swimmer. She competed in the women's 100 metre breaststroke at the 1988 Summer Olympics representing East Germany.
