= Silke Hörner =

East German swimmer

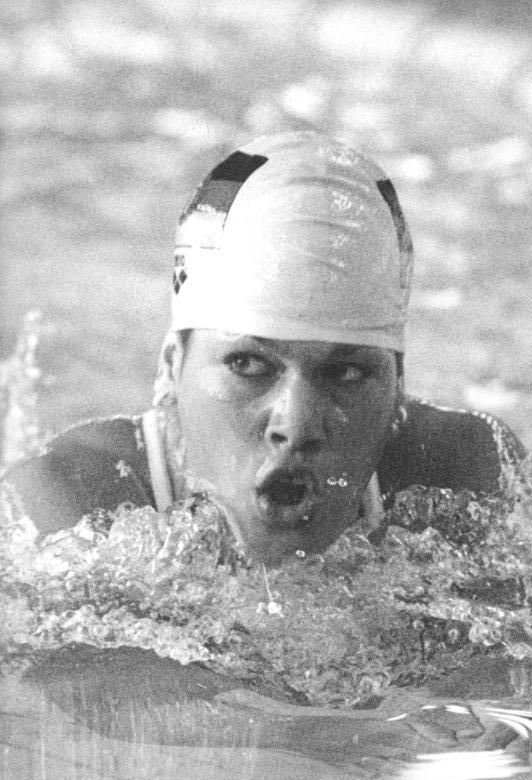
- Hörner in 1985

Personal information
- Full name: Silke Hörner
- Nationality: German
- Born: 12 September 1965 (age 60) Leipzig, Saxony, East Germany
- Height: 168 cm (5 ft 6 in)
- Weight: 62 kg (137 lb)

Sport
- Sport: Swimming
- Strokes: Breaststroke
Medal record
Women's swimming
Representing East Germany
Olympic Games
Gold medal – first place	1988 Seoul	200 m breaststroke
Gold medal – first place	1988 Seoul	4×100 m medley
Bronze medal – third place	1988 Seoul	100 m breaststroke
World Championships (LC)
Gold medal – first place	1986 Madrid	200 m breaststroke
Silver medal – second place	1986 Madrid	100 m breaststroke
European Championships (LC)
Gold medal – first place	1987 Strasbourg	100 m breaststroke
Gold medal – first place	1987 Strasbourg	200 m breaststroke
Gold medal – first place	1987 Strasbourg	4×100 m medley
Silver medal – second place	1985 Sofia	100 m breaststroke
Bronze medal – third place	1985 Sofia	200 m breaststroke

Silke Hörner (born 12 September 1965) is a German former breaststroke swimmer, a leading member of the 1980s East German swimming team. She won two Olympic gold medals, in the 200 m breaststroke and 4×100 m medley relay at the 1988 Summer Olympics in Seoul, and set four individual world records. She was named by Swimming World Magazine as European Swimmer of the Year in 1985 and 1987, but her achievements are regarded with suspicion due to the state-run systematic doping program run by East Germany. In 1991, former East German swimming coach Michael Regner claimed that in the 1980s he had been instructed to distribute anabolic steroids to team swimmers, including Hörner.

Hörner came to prominence when she set a world record in the 200 m breaststroke of 2:28.33 at Leipzig in qualifying for the East German team for the 1985 European Championships. There she stumbled, swimming outside her best to place third in the 200 m event. She also claimed silver behind teammate Sylvia Gerasch in the 100 m event. Despite winning neither event, she was named as the European Swimmer of the Year.

At the 1986 World Championships in Madrid, Hörner, set a world record in the 200 m breaststroke on her way to gold, reclaiming the record from Gerasch who had broken it earlier in the year.

At the 1987 European Championships in Strasbourg, France, Hörner won both breaststroke events, claiming the 100 m breaststroke record from Gerasch in the process and also a gold medal in the 4×100 m medley relay, resulting in her second European Swimmer of the Year award.

At the 1988 Summer Olympics in Seoul, Hörner, set a world record in the 200 m breaststroke on her way to gold, reclaiming the record from Allison Higson of Canada who had broken it earlier in the year. She was well outside her world record in the 100 m breaststroke, finishing with the bronze medal. She later combined with Kristin Otto, Birte Weigang and Katrin Meissner to win gold in the 4×100 m medley relay.

She is married to canoe sprinter Alexander Schuck.

== Awards and honours ==
- 1988 Patriotic Order of Merit in Gold

Awards
Preceded by Kristin Otto	European Swimmer of the Year; 1985	Succeeded by Kristin Otto
Preceded by Kristin Otto	European Swimmer of the Year; 1987	Succeeded by Kristin Otto
