= Sharon Musson =

New Zealand swimmer

Personal information
- Born: 13 December 1969 (age 56) Upper Hutt, Wellington, New Zealand

Sport
- Sport: Swimming

Sharon Musson (born 13 December 1969) is a New Zealand swimmer. She competed in two events at the 1988 Summer Olympics.
