= Laurence Guillou =

French swimmer

Personal information
- Born: 1 October 1969 (age 56) Bordeaux, France

Sport
- Sport: Swimming

Laurence Guillou (born 1 October 1969) is a French swimmer. She competed in two events at the 1988 Summer Olympics.
