= Debby Wurzburger =

Canadian swimmer

Personal information
- Full name: Deborah Joanne Wurzburger
- Nickname: "Debby"
- National team: Canada
- Born: December 14, 1969 (age 56) Burlington, Ontario, Canada
- Height: 1.67 m (5 ft 6 in)
- Weight: 59 kg (130 lb)

Sport
- Sport: Swimming
- Strokes: Freestyle
- Club: London Aquatic Club

Deborah Joanne Wurzburger (born December 12, 1969) is a former competitive swimmer who represented Canada at the 1988 Summer Olympics in Seoul, South Korea. She competed in first round heats of the women's 800-metre freestyle, finished ninth overall, and narrowly missed advancing to the event final.
