= Gabi Reha =

German swimmer

Personal information
- Born: 22 October 1964 (age 61) Karlsruhe, West Germany

Sport
- Sport: Swimming

Gabi Reha (born 22 October 1964) is a German swimmer. She competed in three events at the 1988 Summer Olympics representing West Germany.
