= Aileen Convery =

Irish swimmer

Personal information
- Born: 10 July 1969 (age 56)

Sport
- Sport: Swimming

Aileen Convery (born 10 July 1969) is an Irish swimmer. She competed in two events, the 100m and 200m backstroke, at the 1988 Summer Olympics. She finished 29th in the 100m event and 18th in the 200m event.
