= Nevyana Miteva =

Bulgarian swimmer

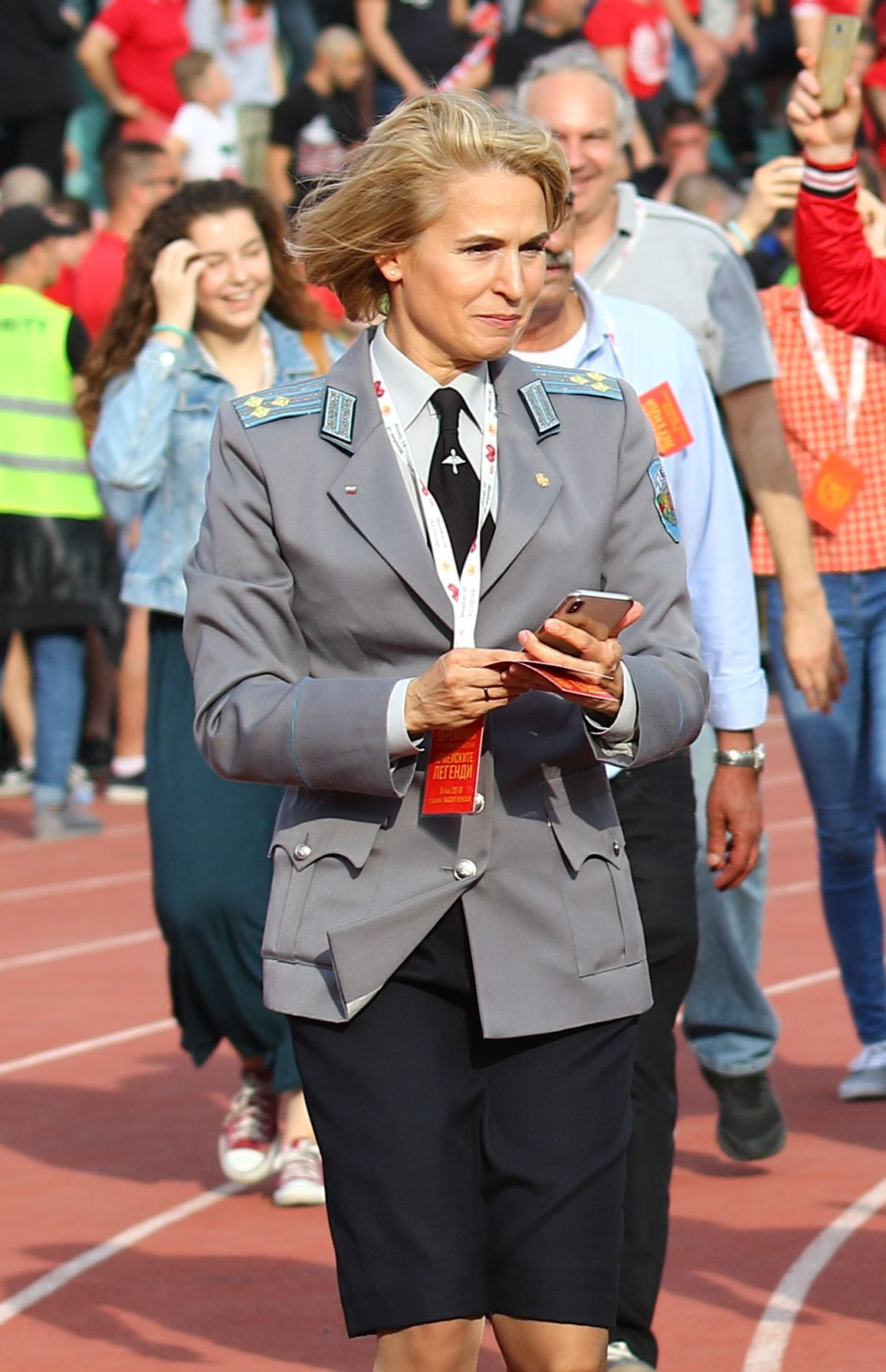

Personal information
- Native name: Невяна Митева
- Born: 2 May 1970 (age 56) Dobrich, Bulgaria
- Height: 1.67 m (5 ft 6 in)
- Weight: 55 kg (121 lb)
- Spouse: Yavor Mateev

Sport
- Sport: Swimming
- Club: Dobrudzha

Nevyana Mihaylova Miteva (Bulgarian: Невяна Михайлова Митева; born 2 May 1970) is a retired Bulgarian swimmer. She competed at the 1988 Summer Olympics in the 100 m and 200 m butterfly and 4 × 100 m medley relay events and reached the final in the relay, her team finishing in sixth place.

She has two master's degrees, one in physical education, and the other in "organization and management of operational and tactical formations of the Air Force", from a military academy. She is a lieutenant colonel working at the general staff office of the Bulgarian Army in Sofia.

She has a brother, Dimitar Mitev.

She was the running mate of Anastas Gerdzhikov in the 2021 Bulgarian general election.

In 2024, Miteva was appointed as Deputy Minister of Foreign Affairs in the Glavchev Government.

== See also ==
- List of Bulgarian records in swimming
