= Elsa Freire =

Angolan swimmer (born 1974)

Personal information
- Full name: Elsa Vicente Freire
- Nationality: Angola
- Born: 12 August 1974 (age 51)
- Height: 1.57 m (5 ft 2 in)
- Weight: 50 kg (110 lb)

Sport
- Sport: Swimming

Elsa Freire (born 12 August 1974) is an Angolan swimmer. She competed at the 1988 Summer Olympics and the 1992 Summer Olympics.
