= Janel Jorgensen =

American swimmer

Personal information
- Full name: Janel Simone Jorgensen
- National team: United States
- Born: May 18, 1971 (age 55)
- Height: 5 ft 10 in (1.78 m)
- Weight: 146 lb (66 kg)

Sport
- Sport: Swimming
- Strokes: Butterfly
- College team: Stanford University
Medal record
Women's swimming
Representing the United States
Olympic Games
Silver medal – second place	1988 Seoul	4x100 m medley
Pan American Games
Gold medal – first place	1987 Indianapolis	100 m butterfly
Gold medal – first place	1987 Indianapolis	4x100 m medley

Janel Simone Jorgensen (born May 18, 1971), later known by her married name Janel McArdle, is an American former competition swimmer and butterfly specialist. As a 17-year-old at the 1988 Summer Olympics in Seoul, South Korea, she won a silver medal as a member of the second-place U.S. team in the women's 4×100-meter medley relay, together with her teammates Beth Barr (backstroke), Tracey McFarlane (breaststroke), and Mary Wayte (freestyle).

Jorgensen received an athletic scholarship to attend Stanford University, where she swam for the Stanford Cardinal swimming and diving team in National Collegiate Athletic Association (NCAA) and Pacific-10 Conference competition. In 1992–93, she was the recipient of the Honda Sports Award for Swimming and Diving, recognizing her as the outstanding college female swimmer of the year. In 2021, she was honored to be a part of the CSCAA's 100 Greatest Collegiate Swimmers of All Time.

Jorgensen is the current COO of Swim Across America, a national non-profit organization that has raised over $100 million for cancer research, prevention and treatment through swimming events all over the United States.

== See also ==
- List of Olympic medalists in swimming (women)
- List of Stanford University people
