= Bistra Gospodinova =

Bulgarian swimmer (born 1966)

Personal information
- Born: 17 February 1966 (age 60) Sofia, Bulgaria
- Height: 1.68 m (5 ft 6 in)
- Weight: 60 kg (130 lb)

Sport
- Sport: Swimming
- Club: Slavia Sofia
Medal record
Women's swimming
Representing Bulgaria
European Championships
| Bronze medal – third place | 1985 Sofia | 4×100 m medley |

Bistra Stefanova Gospodinova (Bulgarian: Бистра Стефанова Господинова; born 17 February 1966) is a retired Bulgarian swimmer who won a bronze medal in the 4 × 100 m medley relay at the 1985 European Aquatics Championships in Sofia. She also competed at the 1988 Summer Olympics and finished sixth in the same event. Gospodinova won the silver medal in the 100m backstroke at the 1985 Summer Universiade.

Since about 1990 she has lived in Rijeka, Croatia with her husband, Dimitar Bobev; both work as swimming coaches.
