= Beth Barr =

American swimmer (born 1971)

Personal information
- Full name: Elizabeth Cynthia Barr
- Nickname: "Beth"
- National team: United States
- Born: December 17, 1971 (age 54)
- Height: 5 ft 10 in (1.78 m)
- Weight: 132 lb (60 kg)

Sport
- Sport: Swimming
- Strokes: Backstroke
- Club: Greater Pensacola AC (formerly PJC Aquatics)
- College team: University of Texas 1995
- Coach: Steve Bultman; Greater Pensacola AC (PJC); Mark Schubert; University of Texas
Medal record
Women's swimming
Representing the United States
Olympic Games
| Silver medal – second place | 1988 Seoul | 4x100 m medley |
Pan Pacific Championships
| Bronze medal – third place | 1987 Brisbane | 200 m backstroke |

Elizabeth Cynthia Barr (born December 17, 1971), later known by her married name Beth Isaak, is an American former competition swimmer for the University of Texas who was a backstroke specialist and 1988 Seoul Olympic silver medalist for the United States in the women's 4×100-meter medley relay. After her swimming career ended, she worked as a lobbyist, and in public relations in Washington D.C., and Phoenix, Arizona, and in 2010 returned to her native Pensacola to teach and coach swimming with her company BARRacuda Swimming Works.

Barr was born on December 17, 1971 to parents Laura and Hugh Barr. She grew up in Pensacola, Florida, and first competed in a swimming race around the age of six. She swam in the Junior Nationals at age 11 and 12, and at the age of 13, was selected to attend the U.S. Nationals at Mission Viejo, California. During her High School years, she trained and competed with Greater Pensacola Aquatic Club (GPAC) (Formerly known as Pensacola Junior College Aquatics) under Hall of Fame Coach Steve Bultman. In February 1986, swimming for Greater Penasacola in the 13-14 year old age group, Barr won the 100 freestyle with a time of 53.59, the 100 backstroke with a time of 58.71, and the 200 butterfly with a time of 2:14.25 at the Eastern Swim Classic in Atlanta, Georgia. While swimming for the Greater Pensacola Club at the highly competitive U.S. Nationals in March 1986 in Orlando, Florida, Barr won the 100-yard backstroke with a time of 55.73. She attended Woodham High School in her early High School Years through December, 1986, but was reassigned or transferred to Booker T. Washington High School by October 1987 where she graduated in 1989.

Barr broke the state record at the 1986 Florida State Championship in the 100-yard backstroke with a time of 56.54 in the preliminaries, though she later placed second in the event in the finals. At the 1986 Florida State Championship, she also swam on Woodham High's second place team in the 200-yard medley relay. She was subsequently named "Girls Athlete of the Year" by the Pensacola Journal.

== 1988 Olympic silver medal ==
As a 16-year-old Junior at Booker T. Washington High School, she represented the United States at the 1988 Summer Olympics in Seoul, South Korea. As the youngest member of the American women's team, she won a silver medal performing the backstroke leg for the second-place U.S. team in the women's 4×100-meter medley relay together with teammates Janel Jorgensen (butterfly), Tracey McFarlane (breaststroke), and Mary Wayte (freestyle). With Barr leading off the team in backstroke, Mary Wayte swam the last leg, and finished with a combined team time of 4:07.9. East Germany, the former world record holder, won the gold with a comfortable four second margin of victory over the American team.

Individually, Barr also competed in the women's 100-meter backstroke, finishing fifth in the event final with a time of 1:02.78, and the women's 200-meter backstroke, finishing fourth in 2:12.39. Her coach at the Greater Pensacola Aquatic Club, Steve Biltman, served as an Assistant coach at the 1988 Seoul Olympics. Two other fellow Greater Pensacola Aquatic Club swimmers competed with her at the Olympics that year, backstroker Andrea Hayes, who also swam for the University of Texas, and Daniel Waters.

Three years after the 1988 Seoul Olympics, in 1991, 20 East German coaches admitted the East German women's Olympic swimming team had been systematically using anabolic steroids in their training. As East German women swimmers finished ahead of her in both her medley relay silver medal, and her fourth place 200-meter backstroke finish, many have speculated that if the German women had been stripped of their medals due to the use of steroids, Barr might have won a silver in the 200-meter backstroke, where two East German women finished ahead of her and a gold in her second place finish with the medley relay where the East German women finished first. She might also have possibly placed third, and won another bronze medal in her 100-meter backstroke event, where she finished fifth with two East German women finishing ahead of her. Barr later told the press that the 1988 Women's head coach Richard Quick told her prior to her medley relay event that she was likely swimming for a silver and not a gold that day.

At the 1987 Pan Pacific Games in Brisbane, Barr won a bronze medal in the 200 backstroke.

== University of Texas ==
Barr attended and swam for the University of Texas, varsity swim team from around 1990-1993 where she was trained by Head women's coach Mark Schubert, a Hall of Fame inductee. As an outstanding contributor she helped lead the team to an NCAA National Title in 1991 by winning the 200 backstroke, and placing second in the 100 backstroke event. That year, Texas scored 746 points and set an NCAA Championship record for most points scored by a team. She lost a year of training and competition as a result of a compound fracture of her right arm caused by an accident horseback riding in May 1989 when she was thrown around 30 feet during a high speed turn. Her recovery involved several surgeries which required plates, screws, and skin grafts, and took months of physical therapy to rehabilitate. As a result, she was unable to train sufficiently to qualify for the 1992 Olympic trials, though she tried, and performed outstandingly in a number of other competitions. Barr graduated from the University of Texas in 1995 with a degree in English Literature.

In 1990-91, she won the national title in the 200-yard backstroke. That year she swam the opening leg of University of Texas's 200-yard medley relay title. During her years at the University of Texas, she was an NCAA individual champion and was named an All-American four times. In 1991, Barr captured the 200-yard backstroke title at the Southwest Conference (SWC) Championships to help Texas win the SWC team title.

She won the national title in the 100 back at the 1986 Short Course Nationals. In competition at the Goodwill Games in 1986, she placed fifth in the 100 backstroke and seventh in the 200 backstroke. In 1990 she captured the 100 and 200 back in Rome at the Len Cup Meet. In U.S. competition, she placed first in the 200 back and third in the 100 back at Long Course Nationals.

In the early 90's Barr trained for a period with Steve Bultman at his Mission Bay Makos club in Boca Raton. After graduating from the University of Texas, she trained for the 1996 Olympics, again with her former coach Steve Bultman, who first coached her in Atlanta with the Dynamo Swim Club and later coached her in Athens at the University of Georgia, when he began coaching there. However, a week before the 1996 trials, she came down with pneumonia, and suffered from food poisoning, halting her hopes of swimming in the trials.

== Later life ==
She relocated to Washington D.C. after ending her career as a competitive swimmer and took a position as a business lobbyist on Capitol Hill. While in Washington, she worked for Congressman Joe Scarborough, and met and later married Arizonan Jason Isaak, who was working as a consultant for Arizona Congressman Jim Kolbe. Isaak and Barr married in Pensacola on October 24, 1998. She later moved with her husband to Phoenix, Arizona around 1999, and started BARRacuda Swim Works, offering swim instruction to triathletes, masters swimmers and novice adult swimmers. After a divorce, she returned with her children to her hometown of Pensacola, Florida and worked in public relations and public affairs. As of 2020 she still owned Baracuda Swim Works and had taught and coached swimming in her hometown of Pensacola since around 2010. Her swim club focused on helping swimmers of all ages enjoy swimming and was conducted at Pensacourt and Pensacola Athletic Club. She has also taught an open water and women's swimming group.

As of 2020, she was still living in Pensacola. In 2021, she supported a bill in the State of Florida that was intended to promote water safety lessons and swimming for children.

=== Honors ===
In September 2023, she was inducted into the Texas Athletics Hall of Honor.

== See also ==
- List of Olympic medalists in swimming (women)
