= Wang Bolin =

Chinese swimmer

Personal information
- Born: February 9, 1971 (age 55)

Sport
- Sport: Swimming
- Strokes: Backstroke

Wang Bolin (born 9 February 1971) is a Chinese former swimmer who competed in the 1988 Summer Olympics.
