= Marion Aizpors =

German swimmer (born 1961)

Personal information
- Born: 18 February 1961 (age 65) Ludwigsburg, West Germany
- Height: 1.80 m (5 ft 11 in)
- Weight: 67 kg (148 lb)

Sport
- Sport: Swimming
- Club: Schwimmverein Gemeinschaft Münster
Medal record
Women's swimming
Representing West Germany
European Championships
Silver medal – second place	1981 Split	4×100 m freestyle
Bronze medal – third place	1981 Split	4×100 m medley
Bronze medal – third place	1989 Bonn	4×100 m freestyle

Marion Aizpors (née Calaklu, born 18 February 1961) is a retired German swimmer who won three relay medals at the 1981 and 1989 European Aquatics Championships. She also competed at the 1988 Summer Olympics in the 50 m freestyle, 100 m backstroke, 4 × 100 m freestyle and 4 × 100 m medley and finished seventh in both relay events. During her career she won nine national freestyle and backstroke titles.
