= Kristin Otto =

East German swimmer

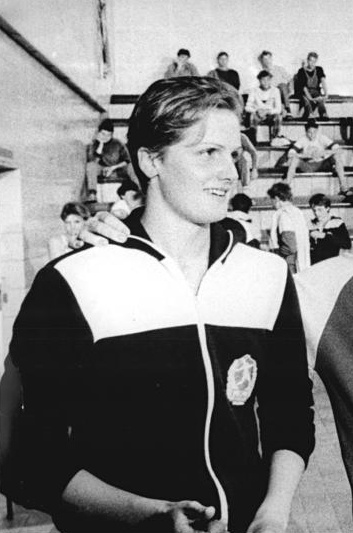
- Otto in 1986

Personal information
- Full name: Kristin Otto
- Nationality: German
- Born: 7 February 1966 (age 60) Leipzig, Bezirk Leipzig, East Germany
- Height: 1.85 m (6 ft 1 in)
- Weight: 70 kg (154 lb)

Sport
- Sport: Swimming
- Strokes: freestyle, butterfly, backstroke
- Club: Sportclub Deutsche Hochschule für Körperkultur Leipzig
Medal record
Women's swimming
Representing East Germany
Olympic Games
Gold medal – first place	1988 Seoul	50 m freestyle
Gold medal – first place	1988 Seoul	100 m freestyle
Gold medal – first place	1988 Seoul	100 m butterfly
Gold medal – first place	1988 Seoul	100 m backstroke
Gold medal – first place	1988 Seoul	4 × 100 m freestyle
Gold medal – first place	1988 Seoul	4 × 100 m medley
World Championships (LC)
Gold medal – first place	1982 Guayaquil	100 m backstroke
Gold medal – first place	1982 Guayaquil	4 × 100 m medley
Gold medal – first place	1982 Guayaquil	4 × 100 m freestyle
Gold medal – first place	1986 Madrid	100 m freestyle
Gold medal – first place	1986 Madrid	200 m medley
Gold medal – first place	1986 Madrid	4 × 100 m freestyle
Gold medal – first place	1986 Madrid	4 × 100 m medley
Silver medal – second place	1986 Madrid	50 m freestyle
Silver medal – second place	1986 Madrid	100 m butterfly
European Championships (LC)
Gold medal – first place	1983 Rome	4 × 100 m freestyle
Gold medal – first place	1983 Rome	4 × 200 m freestyle
Gold medal – first place	1987 Strasbourg	100 m freestyle
Gold medal – first place	1987 Strasbourg	100 m backstroke
Gold medal – first place	1987 Strasbourg	100 m butterfly
Gold medal – first place	1987 Strasbourg	4 × 100 m freestyle
Gold medal – first place	1987 Strasbourg	4 × 100 m medley
Gold medal – first place	1989 Bonn	100 m backstroke
Gold medal – first place	1989 Bonn	4 × 100 m medley
Silver medal – second place	1983 Rome	100 m freestyle
Bronze medal – third place	1989 Bonn	200 m backstroke
Friendship Games
Gold medal – first place	1984 Moscow	100 m freestyle
Gold medal – first place	1984 Moscow	200 m freestyle
Gold medal – first place	1984 Moscow	4 × 100 m freestyle
Silver medal – second place	1984 Moscow	100 m backstroke
Bronze medal – third place	1984 Moscow	200 m backstroke

Kristin Otto (German pronunciation: [ˈkʁɪstɪn ˈʔɔtoː]; born 7 February 1966) is a former East German swimmer, becoming Olympic, World and European champion, multiple times. She is most famous for being the first woman to win six gold medals at a single Olympic Games, doing so at the 1988 Seoul Olympic Games. In long course, she held the world records in the 100 meter and 200 meter freestyle events. Otto was also the first woman to swim the short course 100 meter backstroke in under a minute, doing so at an international short course meet at Indiana University in 1983.

== Career ==
Otto was born in Leipzig, Bezirk Leipzig (present-day Sachsen), East Germany, and began swimming at the age of 11, training in an East German sports academy. At sixteen, she participated in her first world championships, the 1982 World Aquatics Championships, winning the gold medal in the 100 meter backstroke as well as two additional gold medals in the 4×100 m relays with the East German team.

After 1982, Otto changed coaches and began concentrating on other speed strokes. At the following European Championships in 1983, Otto finished second in the 100 meter freestyle, following her fellow East German, Birgit Meineke.

In 1984, Otto set a world record in the 200 meter freestyle. She was expected to win gold medals at the 1984 Los Angeles Olympic Games, but was unable to compete due to the boycott by 14 Eastern Bloc countries, including East Germany. In 1985 she fractured a vertebra, keeping her from competing for most of the year or to go to the European Championships.

Otto returned to competitive swimming at the 1986 World Championships in Madrid, where she won 4 gold medals (100 m freestyle, 200 m individual medley, 4×100 m medley relay and 4×100 m freestyle relay) and 2 silver medals (50 m freestyle, 100 m butterfly). Her success continued the following year at the 1987 European Championships where she won 5 gold medals.

At the 1988 Seoul Olympic Games she once again was expected to win Olympic gold. She won six gold medals, as well as setting Olympic records in the 50 m freestyle and 100 m butterfly.

Otto retired from swimming in 1989. She studied journalism at Leipzig University and subsequently worked as a sports reporter for German television.

She was named the Female World Swimmer of the Year in 1984, 1986 and 1988 by Swimming World. In October 1986, she was awarded a Star of People's Friendship in gold (second class) for her sporting success.

Otto's career was marred by the revelations of widespread performance-enhancing drugs used by East German athletes: former teammate Petra Schneider openly admitted that she had used banned substances. However, Otto stated that she was not aware that she was being doped and she passed all the doping tests during competition, saying: "The medals are the only reminder of how hard I worked. It was not all drugs."

== See also ==
- List of members of the International Swimming Hall of Fame
- List of Olympic medalists in swimming (women)
- List of World Aquatics Championships medalists in swimming (women)
- List of multiple Olympic gold medalists at a single Games
- List of multiple Olympic gold medalists

Records
Preceded by Barbara Krause	Women's 100 metre freestyle world record holder (long course); 19 August 1986 – 1 March 1992	Succeeded by Jenny Thompson
Preceded by Cynthia Woodhead	Women's 200 metre freestyle world record holder (long course); 23 May 1984 – 18 June 1986	Succeeded by Heike Friedrich
Awards and achievements
Preceded by Ute Geweniger	World Swimmer of the Year; 1984	Succeeded by Mary T. Meagher
Preceded by Mary T. Meagher	World Swimmer of the Year; 1986	Succeeded by Janet Evans
Preceded by Janet Evans	World Swimmer of the Year; 1988	Succeeded by Janet Evans
Preceded by Ute Geweniger	European Swimmer of the Year; 1984	Succeeded by Silke Hörner
Preceded by Silke Hörner	European Swimmer of the Year; 1986	Succeeded by Silke Hörner
Preceded by Silke Hörner	European Swimmer of the Year; 1988	Succeeded by Anke Möhring
Preceded by Silke Möller	East German Sportswoman of the Year; 1988–1989	Succeeded by Discontinued
