= Linda Moes =

Dutch swimmer (born 1971)

Personal information
- Born: September 24, 1971 (age 54) Veendam, Groningen, Netherlands

Sport
- Sport: Swimming
- Strokes: Breaststroke

Linda Moes (born September 24, 1971) is a former breaststroke swimmer from The Netherlands, who competed for her native country at the 1988 Summer Olympics in Seoul, South Korea.

There she finished in seventeenth (1:11.87) and in eleventh (2:30.83) place on the 100m and 200m Breaststroke. as the breaststroke swimmer in the 4 × 100 m Medley Relay Team, Moes ended up in fifth place (4:12.19) alongside Jolanda de Rover (backstroke), Conny van Bentum (butterfly) and Karin Brienesse (freestyle).

Four years later, short before the 1992 Summer Olympics in Barcelona, Spain, Moes gave up her place in the Dutch Olympic Team. Kira Bulten took her place in the 4 × 100 m Medley Relay.
