= Betsy Mitchell =

American swimmer

Personal information
- Full name: Betsy Mitchell
- Nickname: "Betsy"
- National team: United States
- Born: January 15, 1966 (age 60)
- Height: 5 ft 9 in (1.75 m)
- Weight: 150 lb (68 kg)

Sport
- Sport: Swimming
- Strokes: Backstroke, freestyle
- College team: University of North Carolina; University of Texas
- Coach: John Trembley; Mercersburg Academy
Medal record
Women's swimming
Representing the United States
Summer Olympics
Gold medal – first place	1984 Los Angeles	4 × 100 m medley
Silver medal – second place	1984 Los Angeles	100 m backstroke
Silver medal – second place	1988 Seoul	4 × 100 m medley
World Championships (LC)
Gold medal – first place	1986 Madrid	100 m backstroke
Silver medal – second place	1986 Madrid	200 m backstroke
Silver medal – second place	1986 Madrid	4×100 m freestyle
Silver medal – second place	1986 Madrid	4×200 m freestyle
Silver medal – second place	1986 Madrid	4×100 m medley

Betsy Mitchell (born January 15, 1966) is an American competition swimmer who was a world record-holder, world champion, and Olympic gold and silver medalist. She also was a member of the United States' 1994 Rowing World Championship team.

Mitchell began competitive swimming at age 5 as a member of the Marietta (Ohio) YMCA Marlins swim team. Her age group coaches in Marietta included Coaches Jim Everett and Bill Bauer. Graduating in 1983, she competed for Mercersburg Academy in Mercersburg, Pennsylvania during her High School years where she was coached by John Trembley. graduating in 1983. Following high school, she attended the University of North Carolina at Chapel Hill and competed for the North Carolina Tar Heels swimming and diving team during her first year, the 1983–84 NCAA season.

Mitchell represented the United States at two consecutive Olympic Games. At the 1984 Summer Olympics in Los Angeles, she won a silver medal for her second-place performance in the women's 100-meter backstroke, finishing with a time of 1:02.63. She also earned a gold medal by swimming the backstroke leg for the winning U.S. team in the preliminary heats of the women's 4×100-meter medley relay.

After the 1984 Olympics, Mitchell transferred to the University of Texas at Austin, and swam for the Texas Longhorns swimming and diving team from 1985 to 1988. She won nine NCAA titles, and was a member of the Longhorns NCAA national championship teams in 1986, 1987 and 1988. Mitchell received the Honda Sports Award for Swimming and Diving 1987–88, and was inducted into the Texas Longhorns Hall of Honor in 2000.

She set an American and world record in the 200-meter backstroke at the 1986 World Championship Trials (2:08.60). The world record stood for five years. The American record stood for 19 years. Swimming World Magazine named her as its American Female Swimmer of the Year in 1986.

She again competed at the 1988 Summer Olympics in Seoul, South Korea. She received a silver medal for swimming the backstroke leg for the second-place U.S. team in the women's 4×100-meter medley relay in the preliminary heats. Individually, she also swam in the final of the women's 100-meter backstroke, finishing fourth in the final with a time of 1:02.71.

She was inducted into the International Swimming Hall of Fame as an "Honor Swimmer" in 1998.

Mitchell has a bachelor's and master's degree in education, specializing in sports administration, from the University of Texas at Austin. She also completed a one-year program at the Harvard Graduate School of Education, earning a certificate in educational administration, planning and policy.

She started her career as the women's swimming coach at Dartmouth College from 1990 to 1996. She then served from 1997 to 2003 as the director of athletics at Laurel School for Girls in Shaker Heights, Ohio. Mitchell was then the director of athletics and recreation at Allegheny College in Meadville, Pennsylvania from 2005 to 2011. After serving at Allegheny, Mitchell served as the director of athletics, physical education, and recreation at the California Institute of Technology in Pasadena, California from 2011 to 2025. On January 6, 2025, she announced she would step down from her role at Caltech in the Spring of 2025.

== See also ==
- List of members of the International Swimming Hall of Fame
- List of Olympic medalists in swimming (women)
- List of University of Texas at Austin alumni
- List of World Aquatics Championships medalists in swimming (women)
- World record progression 200 metres backstroke

Records
Preceded by Cornelia Sirch	Women's 200-meter backstroke world record-holder (long course); June 27, 1986 – August 25, 1991	Succeeded by Krisztina Egerszegi
