= Wang Chi (swimmer) =

Taiwanese swimmer

Personal information
- Full name: 王 琪, Pinyin: Wáng Qí
- Born: 7 March 1970 (age 56)

Sport
- Sport: Swimming

Wang Chi (born 7 March 1970) is a Taiwanese swimmer. She competed in six events at the 1988 Summer Olympics.
