= Kiyomi Takahashi =

Japanese swimmer (born 1966)

Personal information
- Full name: Kiyomi Takahashi
- Nationality: Japanese
- Born: March 3, 1966 (age 60) Japan
- Height: 1.57 m (5 ft 2 in)
- Weight: 52 kg (115 lb)

Sport
- Sport: Swimming
- Strokes: Butterfly
Medal record
Women's swimming
Representing Japan
Pan Pacific Championships
Bronze medal – third place	1987 Brisbane	200 m butterfly
Summer Universiade
Silver medal – second place	1985 Kobe	200 m butterfly
Asian Games
Gold medal – first place	1982 New Delhi	200m butterfly
Silver medal – second place	1982 New Delhi	100m butterfly
Silver medal – second place	1986 Seoul	200m butterfly
Bronze medal – third place	1986 Seoul	100m butterfly

Kiyomi Takahashi (高橋 清美, Takahashi Kiyomi; born 3 March 1966) is a Japanese former swimmer who competed in the 1984 Summer Olympics and in the 1988 Summer Olympics.
