= María Luisa Fernández (swimmer) =

Spanish swimmer

Personal information
- Born: April 1, 1969 (age 57)

Sport
- Sport: Swimming
- Strokes: Butterfly
Medal record
Representing Spain
Mediterranean Games
Bronze medal – third place	1991 Athens	100m butterfly

María Luisa Fernández (born 1 April 1969) is a Spanish butterfly swimmer who competed in the 1988 Summer Olympics and in the 1992 Summer Olympics.
