= Hong Ji-hui =

South Korean swimmer

Personal information
- Born: 28 October 1972 (age 53)

Sport
- Sport: Swimming
- Strokes: backstroke

Hong Ji-hui (born 28 October 1972) is a South Korean backstroke swimmer. She competed in three events at the 1988 Summer Olympics.
