= Tracey McFarlane =

American swimmer (1966)

Personal information
- Full name: Tracey Danielle McFarlane
- National team: United States
- Born: July 20, 1966 (age 60) Montreal, Quebec, Canada
- Education: U. Texas, B.S. Psychology; U. Central Florida MA Phys. Therapy; Nova Southeastern, PHd Phys. Ther.
- Occupations: Swim Coaching; Physical Therapy Executive
- Height: 5 ft 9 in (1.75 m)
- Weight: 130 lb (59 kg)
- Spouse: Robert Duane Mirande (m. 1994)

Sport
- Sport: Swimming
- Strokes: Breaststroke
- Club: Palm Beach Pirannas
- College team: University of Texas
- Coach: Bill Pullis (Pirannas); Richard Quick (U. Texas, Olympics)
Medal record
Women's swimming
Representing the United States
Olympic Games
Silver medal – second place	1988 Seoul	4x100 m medley relay
World Championships
Gold medal – first place	1991 Perth	4x100 m medley relay
Pan Pacific Championships
Silver medal – second place	1989 Tokyo	100 m breaststroke
Bronze medal – third place	1989 Tokyo	200 m breaststroke

Tracey Danielle McFarlane (born July 20, 1966), later known by her married name Tracey Mirande, is a Canadian-born former competition swimmer who competed for the University of Texas, and represented both Canada and the United States in international championships. At the 1988 Olympic trials, she set an American record in the 100-meter breaststroke that held from 1988-92. After obtaining American citizenship in April, 1988, McFarlane won a silver medal swimming the breaststroke leg in the 4x100 meter medley relay at the 1988 Seoul Olympics. After a brief career as a swim coach in Southern California, she moved to Florida and had a career as a therapist, executive, and facilities manager in physical therapy and rehabilitation clinics from 2007-2025. She obtained a Doctorate (DPT) in Physical Therapy in 2010 from the Nova Southeastern Institute in Fort Lauderdale.

== Early life and swimming ==
McFarlane was born July 20, 1966, in Montreal, Quebec. By 1978 at age 11, she swam for the strong program at the Etibicoke Swim Club under Hall of Fame Head Coach, stroke specialist, and future Canadian Olympic team coach Deryk Snelling, in Etibicoke, North of Toronto. In July 1978, swimming for the Etibicoke Club in the girls 11-12 age group, in the Ontario Central Region Championship Meet, Tracy placed fourth in the 100-meter breaststroke, soon to be one of her signature events.

=== Palm Springs ===
After a family move, McFarlane lived in greater Palm Springs, California by 1978, where she attended Palm Springs High School, graduating in 1984. By age 12, she competed for the Palm Beach Piranhas Swim Club under Head Coach Bill Pullis and briefly in 1979-80 for Coach John Schauble. Pullis, like many of his swimmers, was attracted to the Piranna's practice facility at the Palm Springs Aquatic Center and their modern 50-meter pool that offered a scenic view of Mt. St. Jacinto. In December, 1979, McFarlane swam in the Palm Springs Invitational working to gain a place in the qualifying meet for the Southern Pacific Association All-Star Squad in early 1980. Still early in her career, as a multi-stroke competitor at the Palm Springs Invitational, Tracey placed second in the 100-yard butterfly with a time of 1:09.1, qualifying her to compete in the qualifying heat for the All-Star team.

=== University of Texas ===
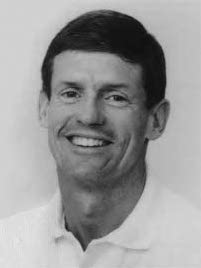
U. Texas Swim Coach, Richard Quick

Tracey attended the University of Texas from 1984-1988, and swam for the Texas Longhorns swimming and diving team in National Collegiate Athletic Association (NCAA) competition under Hall of Fame Coach Richard Quick. At Texas, she helped lead the swim team to four Southwest Conference titles, and an impressive four successive National Collegiate Athletic Association (NCAA) team titles. In the years 1985, 1987, and 1988, in her signature event, the 100 breaststroke, she held National Collegiate Athletic Association titles. In both 1987 and 1988, she won the University of Texas Most Valuable Player award.

At the 1989 Pan Pacific Swimming Championships in Tokyo, she won a silver medal in the 100 m breaststroke, and a bronze medal in the 200 meter breaststroke. Swimming breaststroke, she won a gold medal in the 4x100 Medley relay at the 1991 World Aquatics Championships in Perth, Australia.

Tracey graduated Texas in 1989 with a B.S. in Psychology and later studied Physical Therapy, graduating with a Masters Degree from the University of Central Florida in Orlando in 2002.

=== 1988 Olympic trials ===
As a University of Texas Senior at the August, 1988 Seoul Olympic Swim trails at the University of Texas, McFarlane was at first uncomfortable swimming in front of her friends and family at her home pool, but gained confidence and performed above expectations. She placed first in the 200-meter backstroke event with a personal best time of 2:29.82, gaining a spot on the 1988 U.S. Women's Olympic swim team. She later placed first and broke the American record in the 100-meter breaststroke with a time of 1:08.91, breaking Tracy Caulkin's record of 1:09.53. Applying somewhat late for American citizenship she needed fast processing for her application to attend the trials. Ronald Reagan signed a bill for her citizenship in April, 1988 that bypassed considerable red tape to quickly make her a U.S. citizen.

== 1988 Seoul Olympic silver medal ==
McFarlane represented the United States at the September, 1988 Summer Olympics in Seoul, South Korea. She won a silver medal as a member of the second-place U.S. team in the women's 4×100-meter medley relay; her silver-medal teammates included Beth Barr (backstroke), Janel Jorgensen (butterfly), and Mary Wayte (freestyle). The medley relay team finished with a time of 4:07.90, a full four seconds behind the East German women's relay team that swam a 4:03.74. East Germany was the pre-Games favorite in the event, and when leadoff East German backstroke swimmer Kristin Otto, finished her leg a full 1.5 seconds ahead of the American women's backstroke leadoff swimmer Beth Barr, the American women's chances for a gold quickly faded. Richard Quick, who had coached Tracy at the University of Texas was also the Head U.S. Olympic Women's Swimming team Head Coach in 1988.

In Olympic individual events, McFarlane also competed and made the finals in her signature event, the 100-meter breaststroke, placing sixth with a 1:09.6, which placed her about .77 seconds behind bronze medal contention. East German swimmer Silke Horner took the bronze with a 1:08.83, with Bulgarian swimmers taking both the gold and silver medals. Competing in the Olympic 200-meter breaststroke, McFarlane did not make the finals but finished 14th with a time of 2:33.46.

On Sunday, October 16, 1988, the city of Palm Springs held a welcome home event for Tracy on Main Street that included Street Dancing, and an Irish Dance Troop. Tracey was also feted to a parade in Palm Beach in her honor.

Continuing to compete after the Olympics, McFarlane held the American record in the 100-meter breaststroke from 1988 to 1992, with a time of 1:09.60.

== Professional careers ==
=== Swim coaching ===
Retiring from elite swimming competition, Tracey coached her former swim club, the Palm Beach Pirannas through the mid-1990's.

On October 23, 1994 at Palm Desert's Mariott's Desert Springs Resort, McFarlane married Robert Duane Mirande. The couple honeymooned in Ocho Rios, Jamaica and resided in Palm Springs. After marrying Rob Mirande, both Tracy and Rob coached the Pirannas Swim club in Palm Beach together, and later both coached the Buenaventura Swim Club, currently in Ventura, California.

=== Physical Therapy executive ===
McFarlane obtained a Doctorate in Physical Therapy from Nova Southeastern Institute which she earned from 2009-2010. She worked as an Adjunct Professor for the University of Southern Florida from in Orlando from 2005-2010, and worked in the Health Care field primarily as a physical therapist and a manager of physical therapy facilities in Florida from 2007-2025. From 2021-2025, she worked as a physical therapist, a clinical home health liaison, and from 2021-2025 also served simultaneously as a President and Chief Operating Officer for World Body Wellness in Orlando, a company which she founded. World Body Wellness helped transition clients from outpatient physical therapy environments to health, wellness and independence. From 2019-2021, she worked as a President of Wall-to-Wall fitness in St. Petersburg. She served as a Vice-President of Therapy for Signature Homenow from 2017-2019 in Florida, and a Regional Rehabilitation Director in the field of physical therapy for Kindred at Home from 2015-2017. From 2007-2015, she worked with Brooks Rehabilitation starting as a single clinic manager in 2007, and working her way to Regional Manager opening and overseeing nine clinics in greater Orlando, Florida.

In 2005, Tracey and Kathleen Bissell co-wrote the book Championship Swimming: How to Swim Like a Pro in 30 Days or Less with a foreword by Hall of Fame Coach Richard Quick, her University of Texas and Olympic coach. The book centered on how to improve swimming technique in thirty days and subsequently improve speed. The book was originally published by McGraw-Hill in July, 2005, and has a paperback version. It is also currently available as an E-book.

Tracey has competed frequently with United States Masters Swimming, and remained active as a swimmer at least through 2018, often placing in the top ten nationally in her age group. She has competed in freestyle, butterfly, breaststroke and relay events, from 1991 through 2018, focusing more on her breaststroke specialties from 2011-2018.

=== Honors ===
McFarlane was inducted into the University of Texas Athletics Hall of Fame in 2006. In a noteworthy collegiate honor, she was inducted into the Southwest Conference's 1980's All-Decade team.

== See also ==
- List of Olympic medalists in swimming (women)
- List of University of Texas at Austin alumni
- List of World Aquatics Championships medalists in swimming (women)
