= Ilaria Tocchini =

Italian swimmer

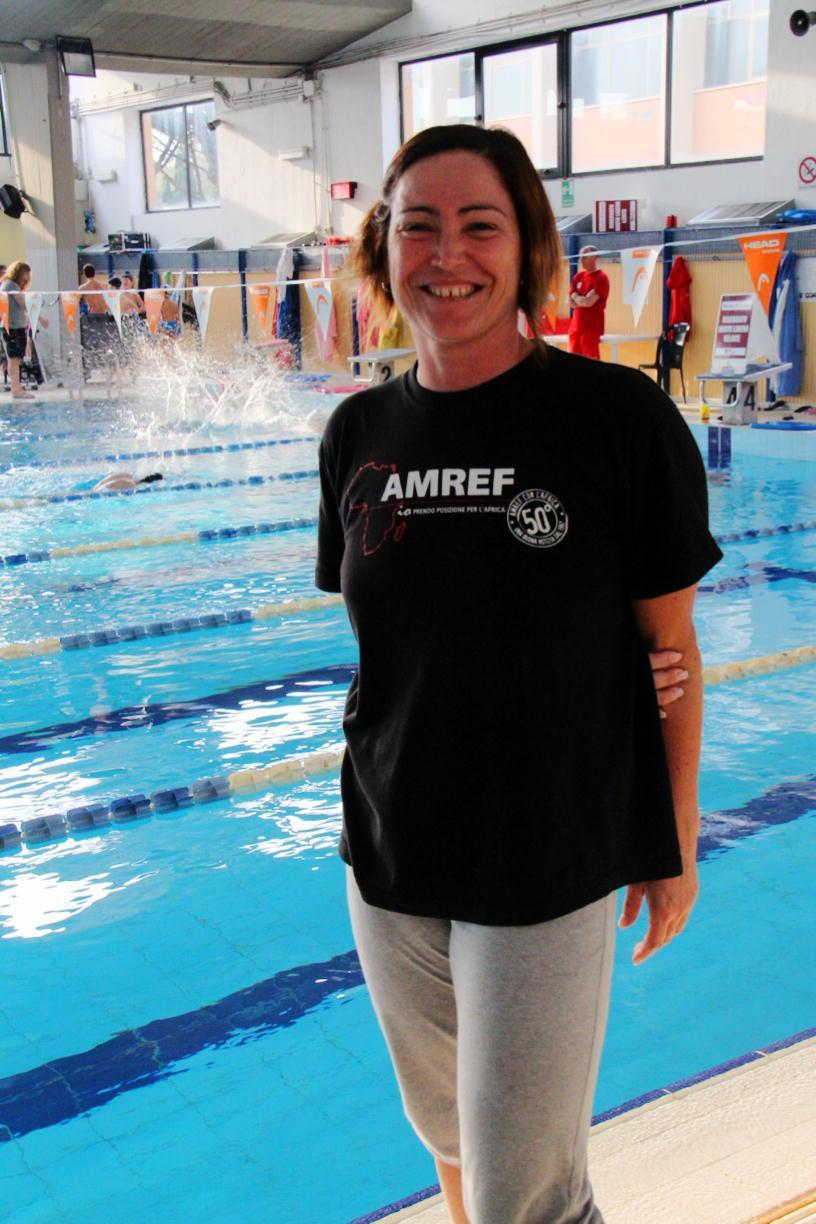

Personal information
- Born: 4 August 1967 (age 58)
Medal record
Women's swimming
Representing Italy
European Championships
Silver medal – second place	1987 Strasbourg	4×100 m medley
Silver medal – second place	1995 Vienna	100 m butterfly
Summer Universiade
Gold medal – first place	1987 Zagreb	100 m butterfly
Mediterranean Games
Gold medal – first place	1997 Bari	100 m butterfly

Ilaria Tocchini (born 4 August 1967 in Livorno) is a retired butterfly swimmer from Italy, who represented her native country in three consecutive Summer Olympics, starting in 1988. She won her first international senior medal, a silver with the women's 4×100 m medley relay team, at the 1987 European Championships (long course) in Strasbourg, France.
