= Qian Hong (swimmer) =

Chinese swimmer (born 1971)

Medal record

Women's swimming

Representing China

Olympic Games
Gold medal – first place	1992 Barcelona	100 m butterfly
Bronze medal – third place	1988 Seoul	100 m butterfly

World Championships (LC)
Gold medal – first place	1991 Perth	100 m butterfly

Pan Pacific Championships
Gold medal – first place	1987 Brisbane	100 m butterfly
Gold medal – first place	1989 Tokyo	100 m butterfly

Summer Universiade
Silver medal – second place	1991 Sheffield	100 m butterfly

Qian Hong (simplified Chinese: 钱红; traditional Chinese: 錢紅; pinyin: Qián Hóng; born January 30, 1971, in Baoding, Hebei) is a former butterfly swimmer from China and two-time Olympic medalist. Qian first won a bronze medal in the 100 m butterfly at the 1988 Summer Olympics in Seoul, South Korea. Four years later she captured gold in the same event at the 1992 Summer Olympics in Barcelona, Spain.
