= Svenja Schlicht =

German swimmer

Personal information
- Born: June 26, 1967 (age 59) Neumünster, West Germany

Sport
- Sport: Swimming
Medal record
Representing West Germany
Olympic Games
Silver medal – second place	1984 Los Angeles	4x100 m medley relay
World Championships
Bronze medal – third place	1991 Perth	4x100m medley relay
European Championships
Silver medal – second place	1987 Strasbourg	100m backstroke
Bronze medal – third place	1983 Rome	4x100m medley relay
Bronze medal – third place	1987 Strasbourg	4x100m freestyle relay
Bronze medal – third place	1987 Strasbourg	4x200m freestyle relay
Bronze medal – third place	1987 Strasbourg	4x100m medley relay

Svenja Schlicht (born 26 June 1967) is a German former swimmer who competed in the 1984 Summer Olympics and in the 1988 Summer Olympics.
