= Johanna Larsson (swimmer) =

Swedish swimmer (born 1972)

Personal information
- Born: 1 January 1972 (age 54) Leksberg, Västra Götaland

Sport
- Sport: Swimming
- Strokes: Backstroke

Johanna Margareta Larsson (born 1 January 1972) is a former Swedish Olympic backstroke swimmer. She competed in the 1988 Summer Olympics, where she swam the 100 m backstroke, 200 m backstroke and the 4×100 m medley relay.

== Clubs ==
- Mariestads SS
