= Britta Dahm =

German swimmer

Personal information
- Born: 21 September 1968 (age 57) Duisburg, West Germany
- Height: 1.73 m (5 ft 8 in)
- Weight: 64 kg (141 lb)

Sport
- Sport: Swimming
- Club: Schwimm Gemeinschaft Duisburg
Medal record
Women's swimming
Representing West Germany
European Championships
Bronze medal – third place	1987 Strasbourg	4×100 m medley

Britta Dahm (born 21 September 1968) is a retired German breaststroke swimmer who won a bronze medal in the 4 × 100 m medley relay at the 1987 European Aquatics Championships. She also competed in the 100 m and 200 m breaststroke and 4 × 100 m medley relay events at the 1988 Summer Olympics, and her team finished seventh in the relay.
