= Satoko Morishita =

Japanese swimmer

Personal information
- Born: April 17, 1974 (age 52)

Sport
- Sport: Swimming
- Strokes: Backstroke

Satoko Morishita (森下 恵子, Morishita Satoko; born 17 April 1974) is a Japanese former backstroke swimmer who competed in the 1988 Summer Olympics.
