= Tanya Dangalakova =

Bulgarian swimmer (born 1964)

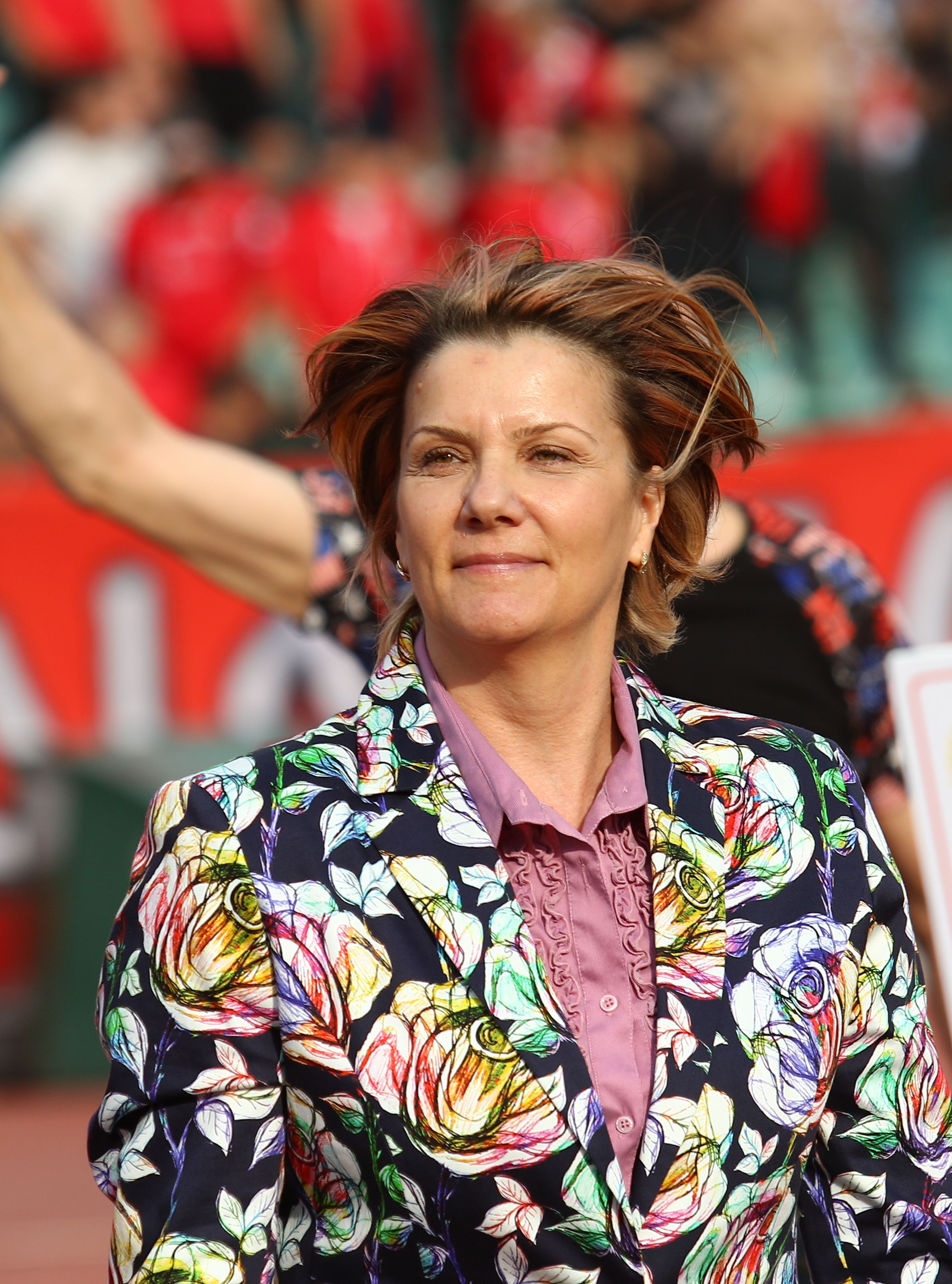

Personal information
- Born: 30 June 1964 (age 62)
Medal record
Women's swimming
Representing Bulgaria
Olympic Games
Gold medal – first place	1988 Seoul	100 m breaststroke
World Championships (LC)
Silver medal – second place	1986 Madrid	200 m breaststroke
Bronze medal – third place	1986 Madrid	100 m breaststroke
European Championships (LC)
Gold medal – first place	1985 Sofia	200 m breaststroke
Silver medal – second place	1989 Bonn	100 m breaststroke
Bronze medal – third place	1983 Rome	100 m breaststroke
Bronze medal – third place	1985 Sofia	100 m breaststroke
Bronze medal – third place	1985 Sofia	4×100 m medley
Bronze medal – third place	1991 Athens	100 m breaststroke
Bronze medal – third place	1991 Athens	200 m breaststroke
Summer Universiade
Gold medal – first place	1985 Kobe	100 m breaststroke
Gold medal – first place	1985 Kobe	200 m breaststroke
Bronze medal – third place	1985 Kobe	200 m medley

Tanya Bogomilova (Bulgarian: Таня Богомилова), married Dangalakova, (born 30 June 1964) is a former breaststroke swimmer from Bulgaria, who won the gold medal in the 100 m breaststroke at the 1988 Summer Olympics in Seoul, South Korea.

At the 1985 European Aquatics Championships she prevented East Germany from sweeping all women's events for the third European Championships in a row, by winning the 200 meter breaststroke by 0.45 seconds.
