= Andrea Nugent =

Canadian swimmer (born 1968)

Personal information
- Full name: Andrea Nugent
- National team: Canada
- Born: November 1, 1968 (age 57) Montreal, Quebec, Canada
- Height: 172 cm (5 ft 8 in)
- Weight: 65 kg (143 lb)

Sport
- Sport: Swimming
- Strokes: Butterfly, freestyle
- College team: University of Calgary
Medal record
Women's swimming
Representing Canada
Olympic Games
Bronze medal – third place	1988 Seoul	4×100 m medley
Commonwealth Games
Gold medal – first place	1986 Edinburgh	4×100 m medley
Silver medal – second place	1994 Victoria	50 m freestyle
Bronze medal – third place	1990 Auckland	50 m freestyle
Summer Universiade
Bronze medal – third place	1991 Sheffield	100 m freestyle

Andrea Nugent (born November 1, 1968) is an RMT and Canadian former competition swimmer who specialized in butterfly and freestyle events. Nugent won the bronze medal with the women's 4x100-metre medley relay team at the 1988 Summer Olympics in Seoul, South Korea, together with Canadian teammates Allison Higson, Jane Kerr and Lori Melien.

== See also ==
- List of Olympic medalists in swimming (women)
- List of Commonwealth Games medallists in swimming (women)
