= Lorenza Vigarani =

Italian swimmer (born 1969)

Personal information
- Full name: Lorenza Vigarani
- Nationality: Italian
- Born: 10 December 1969 (age 56) Bologna
- Height: 1.76 m (5 ft 9 in)

Sport
- Sport: Swimming
- Strokes: Backstroke
- Club: President Nuoto Club
Medal record
World Championships
Bronze medal – third place	1994 Rome	200 m backstroke
European Championships
Silver medal – second place	1987 Strasbourg	4×100 m medley
Silver medal – second place	1989 Bonn	4×100 m medley
Silver medal – second place	1993 Sheffield	200 m backstroke
Mediterranean Games
Gold medal – first place	1987 Latakia	200 m backstroke
Gold medal – first place	1991 Athens	200 m backstroke

Lorenza Vigarani (born 10 December 1969, in Bologna) is a retired backstroke swimmer from Italy, who represented her native country in three consecutive Summer Olympics, starting in 1988. She won her first international senior medal (silver) as a member of the women's 4×100 medley relay team at the 1987 European Championships (long course).
