= Jane Kerr =

Canadian swimmer

Personal information
- Full name: Jane Louise Kerr Thompson
- National team: Canada
- Born: May 12, 1968 (age 58) Mississauga, Ontario, Canada
- Height: 1.75 m (5 ft 9 in)
- Weight: 63 kg (139 lb)

Sport
- Sport: Swimming
- Strokes: Freestyle, butterfly
- Club: Etobicoke Swim Club
- College team: University of Florida
Medal record
Women's swimming
Representing Canada
Olympic Games
Bronze medal – third place	1988 Seoul	4×100 m medley
Pan Pacific Championships
Bronze medal – third place	1987 Brisbane	100 m freestyle
Bronze medal – third place	1987 Brisbane	200 m medley
Commonwealth Games
Gold medal – first place	1986 Edinburgh	100 m freestyle
Gold medal – first place	1986 Edinburgh	4×100 m freestyle
Silver medal – second place	1986 Edinburgh	200 m freestyle
Silver medal – second place	1986 Edinburgh	4×100 m medley
Bronze medal – third place	1986 Edinburgh	200 m medley
Bronze medal – third place	1986 Edinburgh	4×200 m freestyle
Pan American Games
Silver medal – second place	1983 Caracas	100 m freestyle
Silver medal – second place	1983 Caracas	4×100 m freestyle
Silver medal – second place	1983 Caracas	4×100 m medley

Jane Louise Kerr Thompson (born May 12, 1968), née Jane Louise Kerr, is a former competition swimmer from Canada. Kerr was a butterfly and freestyle specialist who was an Olympic bronze medallist.

== Early years ==
Kerr was born in Mississauga, Ontario. She started her elite swim training at the Etobicoke Swim Club in 1976.

== International career ==
At the age of 16, Kerr represented Canada at the 1984 Olympic Games in Los Angeles, California. She was a member of the Canadian women's 4x100-metre freestyle relay team that finished fifth in the world. She also competed in the 100- and 200-metre freestyle events, placing fourteenth in both.

At the 1986 Commonwealth Games in Edinburgh, Scotland, she won gold medals in the 100-metres freestyle and 4x100-metre freestyle relay. She also won silver medals in the 200-metre freestyle and 4x100-metre medley relay, and bronze medals in the 200-metre individual medley and 4x200-metre freestyle relay.

Kerr won a bronze medal as a member of the third-place Canadian women's 4x100-metre medley relay team at the 1988 Summer Olympics in Seoul, South Korea, together with Andrea Nugent, Allison Higson and Lori Melien. She was also a member of the Canadian women's 4x100-metres freestyle relay team that placed sixth in the world.

== College career ==
After the 1988 Olympics, Kerr accepted an athletic scholarship to attend the University of Florida in Gainesville, Florida, where she swam for the Florida Gators swimming and diving team in National Collegiate Athletic Association (NCAA) competition under coach Randy Reese and coach Mitch Ivey from 1989 to 1992. She won four Southeastern Conference (SEC) individual championships in the 200-metres freestyle (1989), 200-metres individual medley (1991, 1992), and 400-metres individual medley (1992), and was a member of seven of the Gators' SEC championship relay teams. Kerr was also a member of the Gators' 1989 NCAA national championship relay team in the 4x100-metres freestyle, together with Laura Walker, Carmen Cowart and Paige Zemina. She received twenty-three All-American honors during her four-year American college swimming career. As a senior in 1991–92, she was the Gators team captain.

She graduated from the University of Florida with a bachelor's degree in finance in 1992.

== Life after swimming ==
Kerr and Sandy Goss were inducted into the Swimming Canada Circle of Excellence Hall of Fame in 2006. She is married, and she and her husband have a daughter born in 2005, and a son born in 2008. Since 2006, she has been a partner in the Toronto office of Accenture.

== See also ==
- List of Olympic medalists in swimming (women)
- List of University of Florida alumni
- List of University of Florida Olympians
