= Lori Melien =

Canadian swimmer (born 1972)

Personal information
- Full name: Lori Anne Melien
- National team: Canada
- Born: May 11, 1972 (age 54) Calgary, Alberta, Canada
- Height: 168 cm (5 ft 6 in)
- Weight: 57 kg (126 lb)

Sport
- Sport: Swimming
- Strokes: Backstroke
- Club: Ajax Aquatic Club
- College team: University of Calgary
Medal record
Women's swimming
Representing Canada
Olympic Games
Bronze medal – third place	1988 Seoul	4x100 m medley relay
Commonwealth Games
Bronze medal – third place	1990 Auckland	4x100 m medley relay

Lori Anne Melien (born May 11, 1972) is a former competition swimmer from Canada. Melien won a bronze medal in the women's 4x100-metre medley relay at the 1988 Summer Olympics in Seoul, South Korea, together with Andrea Nugent, Allison Higson and Jane Kerr.

In individual events, she finished 12th and 19th in the 100-metre and 200-metre backstroke. Melien swam much of her amateur career for the Ajax Aquatic Club in Ajax, Ontario where she still holds a number of club records.

== See also ==
- List of Olympic medalists in swimming (women)
