= Jamsil Indoor Swimming Pool =

Swimming venue in Seoul, South Korea

Coordinates: 37°31′16″N 127°7′35″E

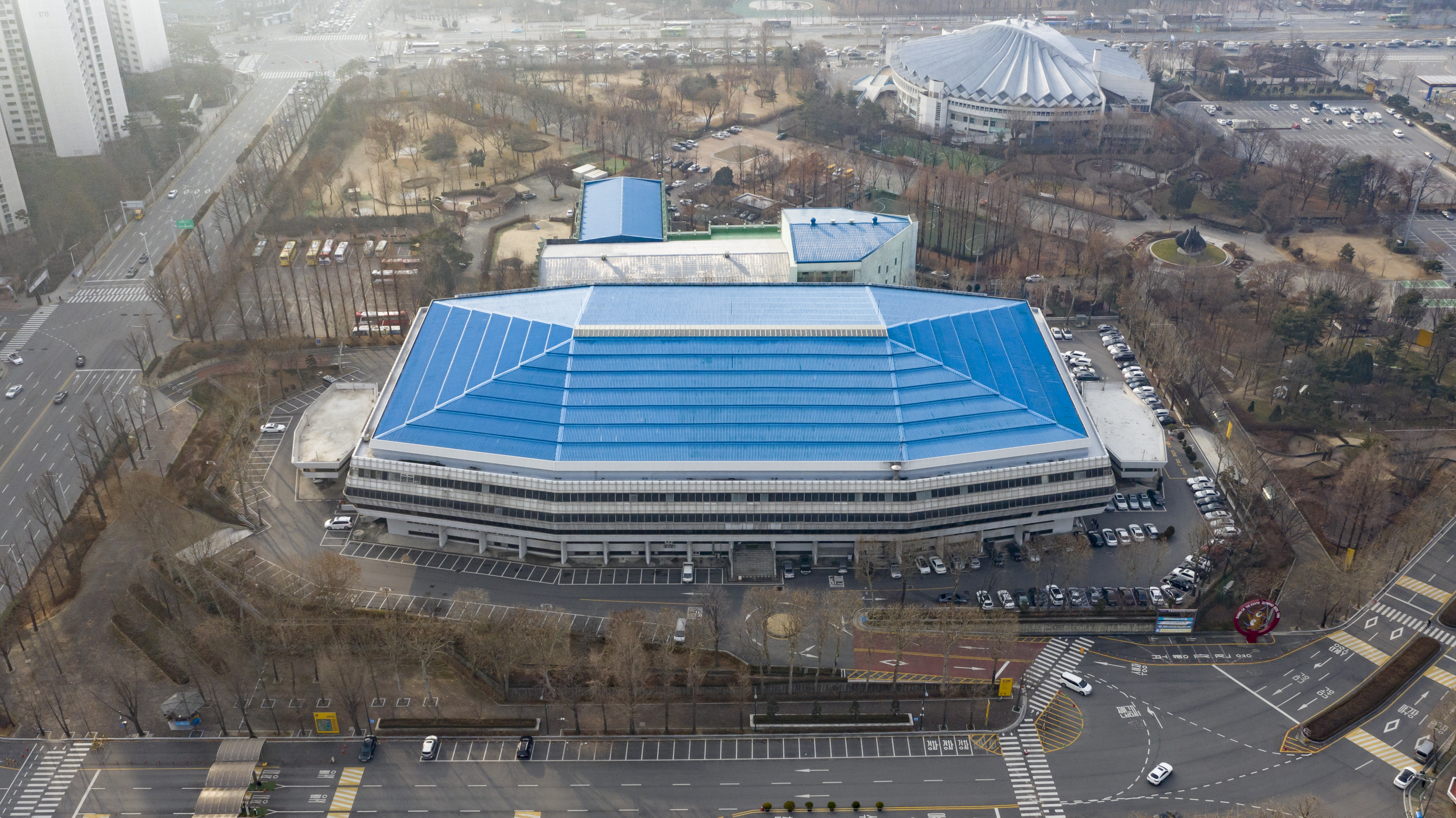
- Interactive map of Jamsil Indoor Swimming Pool
- Address: Seoul
- Capacity: 8,000

Construction
- Built: 1977–1980
- Opened: December 1980

Jamsil Indoor Swimming Pool (Korean: 잠실 제1수영장; Hanja: 蠶室第1水泳場) is an aquatics venue located in Seoul, South Korea. It hosted the swimming, diving, water polo, synchronized swimming, and the swimming part of the modern pentathlon events at the 1988 Summer Olympics and the swimming at the 1988 Summer Paralympics.

The venue was constructed from November 1977 to December 1980 and has a seating capacity of 8,000.
