= Allison Higson =

Canadian swimmer (born 1973)

Personal information
- Full name: Allison Ann Higson
- National team: Canada
- Born: March 13, 1973 (age 53) Mississauga, Ontario, Canada
- Height: 1.80 m (5 ft 11 in)
- Weight: 70 kg (154 lb)

Sport
- Sport: Swimming
- Strokes: Breaststroke, freestyle
- Club: Etobicoke Swim Club, University of Calgary, Napa Valley Swim Team
- College team: Stanford University
Medal record
Women's swimming
Representing Canada
Olympic Games
Bronze medal – third place	1988 Seoul	4x100 m medley
World Championships (LC)
Bronze medal – third place	1986 Madrid	200 m breaststroke
Pan Pacific Championships
Gold medal – first place	1987 Brisbane	100 m breaststroke
Silver medal – second place	1987 Brisbane	200 m medley
Commonwealth Games
Gold medal – first place	1986 Edinburgh	100 m breaststroke
Gold medal – first place	1986 Edinburgh	200 m breaststroke
Silver medal – second place	1986 Edinburgh	4x100 m medley
Silver medal – second place	1990 Auckland	4x100 m freestyle

Allison Ann Higson (born March 13, 1973), later known by her married name Allison Cavanaugh, is a former 2-time Olympic breaststroke, individual medley, and freestyle swimmer from Canada. Born in Mississauga, Ontario, she grew up in Brampton, Ontario, a suburb of Toronto. She now lives in Traverse City, Michigan with her husband, Sean, and 2 children.

At the 1986 Commonwealth Games in Edinburgh, Scotland, Higson won gold medals in the women's 100-metre and 200-metre breaststroke, setting new Commonwealth Records in both. Later that summer at the 1986 World Championships in Madrid, Spain, Higson captured a bronze medal in the 200-metre breaststroke event.

At the 1988 Canadian Olympic Trials, in Montreal, Quebec, at the age of 15, Higson broke the women's 200-metre breaststroke World Record in a time of 2:27:27, previously held by Silke Hoerner of East Germany.

Higson also competed at the 1992 Summer Olympics in Barcelona, Spain, in the preliminary heats of the 100-metre and 200-metre freestyle, and placed eighth in final of the women's 4x100-metre freestyle relay as a member of Canada's team.

== See also ==
- List of Olympic medalists in swimming (women)
- World record progression 200 metres breaststroke
