= List of European Aquatics Championships medalists in swimming (women) =

This is the complete list of women's LEN European Aquatics Championships medalists in swimming since 1927.

== Freestyle ==
=== 50 metre ===
Year	Gold	Silver	Bronze
1987 Strasbourg	Tamara Costache (ROM)	Katrin Meissner (GDR)	Christiane Pielke (FRG)
1989 Bonn	Catherine Plewinski (FRA)	Daniela Hunger (GDR)	Katrin Meissner (GDR)
1991 Athens	Simone Osygus (GER)	Catherine Plewinski (FRA)	Inge de Bruijn (NED)
1993 Sheffield	Franziska van Almsick (GER)	Linda Olofsson (SWE)	Inge de Bruijn (NED)
1995 Vienna	Linda Olofsson (SWE)	Franziska van Almsick (GER)	Angela Postma (NED)
1997 Seville	Natalya Meshcheryakova (RUS)	Sandra Völker (GER)	Therese Alshammar (SWE)
1999 Istanbul	Inge de Bruijn (NED)	Therese Alshammar (SWE)	Alison Sheppard (GBR)
2000 Helsinki	Therese Alshammar (SWE)	Wilma van Hofwegen (NED)	Olga Mukomol (UKR)
2002 Berlin	Therese Alshammar (SWE)	Martina Moravcová (SVK)	Aleksandra Gerasimenya (BLR)
2004 Madrid	Therese Alshammar (SWE)	Sviatlana Khakhlova (BLR)	Sandra Völker (GER)
2006 Budapest	Britta Steffen (GER)	Therese Alshammar (SWE)	Marleen Veldhuis (NED)
2008 Eindhoven	Marleen Veldhuis (NED)	Hinkelien Schreuder (NED)	Therese Alshammar (SWE)
2010 Budapest	Therese Alshammar (SWE)	Hinkelien Schreuder (NED)	Francesca Halsall (GBR)
2012 Debrecen	Britta Steffen (GER)	Hinkelien Schreuder (NED)	Nery Mantey Niangkouara (GRE)
2014 Berlin	Francesca Halsall (GBR)	Sarah Sjöström (SWE)	Jeanette Ottesen (DEN)
2016 London	Ranomi Kromowidjojo (NED)	Francesca Halsall (GBR)	Jeanette Ottesen (DEN)
2018 Glasgow	Sarah Sjöström (SWE)	Pernille Blume (DEN)	Ranomi Kromowidjojo (NED)
2020 Budapest	Ranomi Kromowidjojo (NED)	Pernille Blume (DEN) Katarzyna Wasick (POL)	none awarded
2022 Rome	Sarah Sjöström (SWE)	Katarzyna Wasick (POL)	Valerie van Roon (NED)
2024 Belgrade	Petra Senánszky (HUN)	Theodora Drakou (GRE)	Julie Kepp Jensen (DEN)
2026 Paris	Katarzyna Wasick (POL)	Sarah Sjöström (SWE)	Sara Curtis (ITA)

- Most gold medals: 4 Therese Alshammar (SWE)
- Most medals: 8 Therese Alshammar (SWE)

=== 100 metre ===
Year	Gold	Silver	Bronze
1927 Bologna	Maria Vierdag (NED)	Joyce Cooper (GBR)	Charlotte Lehmann (GER)
1931 Paris	Yvonne Godard (FRA)	Willy den Ouden (NED)	Joyce Cooper (GBR)
1934 Magdeburg	Willy den Ouden (NED)	Rie Mastenbroek (NED)	Gisela Arendt (GER)
1938 London	Ragnhild Hveger (DEN)	Birte Ove-Petersen (DEN)	Rie van Veen (NED)
1947 Monte Carlo	Fritze Carstensen (DEN)	Hannie Termeulen (NED)	Greta Andersen (DEN)
1950 Vienna	Irma Heijting-Schuhmacher (NED)	Marie-Louise Linssen-Vaessen (NED)	Greta Andersen (DEN)
1954 Turin	Katalin Szőke (HUN)	Judit Temes (HUN)	Geertje Wielema (NED)
1958 Budapest	Kate Jobson (SWE)	Cocky Gastelaars (NED)	Judy Grinham (GBR)
1962 Leipzig	Heidi Pechstein (GDR)	Diana Wilkinson (GBR)	Ineke Tigelaar (NED)
1966 Utrecht	Martina Grunert (GDR)	Judit Turóczy (HUN)	Pauline Sillett (GBR)
1970 Barcelona	Gabriele Wetzko (GDR)	Mirjana Šegrt (YUG)	Alexandra Jackson (GBR)
1974 Vienna	Kornelia Ender (GDR)	Angela Franke (GDR)	Enith Brigitha (NED)
1977 Jönköping	Barbara Krause (GDR)	Enith Brigitha (NED)	Petra Priemer (GDR)
1981 Split	Caren Metschuck (GDR)	Birgit Meineke (GDR)	Conny van Bentum (NED)
1983 Rome	Birgit Meineke (GDR)	Kristin Otto (GDR)	Conny van Bentum (NED)
1985 Sofia	Heike Friedrich (GDR)	Manuela Stellmach (GDR)	Conny van Bentum (NED)
1987 Strasbourg	Kristin Otto (GDR)	Manuela Stellmach (GDR)	Tamara Costache (ROM)
1989 Bonn	Katrin Meissner (GDR)	Manuela Stellmach (GDR)	Marianne Muis (NED)
1991 Athens	Catherine Plewinski (FRA)	Karin Brienesse (NED)	Simone Osygus (GER)
1993 Sheffield	Franziska van Almsick (GER)	Martina Moravcová (SVK)	Catherine Plewinski (FRA)
1995 Vienna	Franziska van Almsick (GER)	Mette Jacobsen (DEN)	Karen Pickering (GBR)
1997 Seville	Sandra Völker (GER)	Martina Moravcová (SVK)	Antje Buschschulte (GER)
1999 Istanbul	Sue Rolph (GBR)	Inge de Bruijn (NED)	Sandra Völker (GER)
2000 Helsinki	Therese Alshammar (SWE)	Martina Moravcová (SVK)	Mette Jacobsen (DEN)
2002 Berlin	Franziska van Almsick (GER)	Martina Moravcová (SVK)	Alena Popchanka (BLR)
2004 Madrid	Malia Metella (FRA)	Marleen Veldhuis (NED)	Nery Mantey Niangkouara (GRE)
2006 Budapest	Britta Steffen (GER)	Marleen Veldhuis (NED)	Nery Mantey Niangkouara (GRE)
2008 Eindhoven	Marleen Veldhuis (NED)	Hanna-Maria Seppälä (FIN)	Inge Dekker (NED)
2010 Budapest	Francesca Halsall (GBR)	Aleksandra Gerasimenya (BLR)	Femke Heemskerk (NED)
2012 Debrecen	Sarah Sjöström (SWE)	Britta Steffen (GER)	Daniela Schreiber (GER)
2014 Berlin	Sarah Sjöström (SWE)	Femke Heemskerk (NED)	Michelle Coleman (SWE)
2016 London	Sarah Sjöström (SWE)	Ranomi Kromowidjojo (NED)	Femke Heemskerk (NED)
2018 Glasgow	Sarah Sjöström (SWE)	Femke Heemskerk (NED)	Charlotte Bonnet (FRA)
2020 Budapest	Femke Heemskerk (NED)	Marie Wattel (FRA)	Anna Hopkin (GBR)
2022 Rome	Marrit Steenbergen (NED)	Charlotte Bonnet (FRA)	Freya Anderson (GBR)
2024 Belgrade	Barbora Seemanová (CZE)	Barbora Janíčková (CZE)	Nikolett Pádár (HUN)
2026 Paris	Marrit Steenbergen (NED)	Milou van Wijk (NED)	Sara Curtis (ITA)

- Most gold medals: 4 Sarah Sjöström (SWE)

=== 200 metre ===
Year	Gold	Silver	Bronze
1970 Barcelona	Gabriele Wetzko (GDR)	Mirjana Šegrt (YUG)	Yvonne Nieber (GDR)
1974 Vienna	Kornelia Ender (GDR)	Enith Brigitha (NED)	Andrea Eife (GDR)
1977 Jönköping	Petra Thümer (GDR)	Barbara Krause (GDR)	Annelies Maas (NED)
1981 Split	Carmela Schmidt (GDR)	Birgit Meineke (GDR)	Conny van Bentum (NED)
1983 Rome	Birgit Meineke (GDR)	Astrid Strauss (GDR)	Conny van Bentum (NED)
1985 Sofia	Heike Friedrich (GDR)	Manuela Stellmach (GDR)	Vania Argirova (BUL)
1987 Strasbourg	Heike Friedrich (GDR)	Manuela Stellmach (GDR)	Luminița Dobrescu (ROM)
1989 Bonn	Manuela Stellmach (GDR)	Marianne Muis (NED)	Mette Jacobsen (DEN)
1991 Athens	Mette Jacobsen (DEN)	Catherine Plewinski (FRA)	Luminița Dobrescu (ROM)
1993 Sheffield	Franziska van Almsick (GER)	Luminița Dobrescu (ROM)	Karen Pickering (GBR)
1995 Vienna	Kerstin Kielgass (GER)	Malin Nilsson (SWE)	Mette Jacobsen (DEN)
1995 Vienna	Kerstin Kielgass (GER)	Malin Nilsson (SWE)	Karen Pickering (GBR)
1997 Seville	Michelle Smith (IRL)	Nadezhda Chemezova (RUS)	Camelia Potec (ROM)
1999 Istanbul	Camelia Potec (ROM)	Kerstin Kielgass (GER)	Natalya Baranovskaya (BLR)
2000 Helsinki	Natalya Baranovskaya (BLR)	Martina Moravcová (SVK)	Camelia Potec (ROM)
2002 Berlin	Franziska van Almsick (GER)	Camelia Potec (ROM)	Alena Popchanka (BLR)
2004 Madrid	Camelia Potec (ROM)	Solenne Figuès (FRA)	Josefin Lillhage (SWE)
2006 Budapest	Otylia Jędrzejczak (POL)	Annika Liebs (GER)	Laure Manaudou (FRA)
2008 Eindhoven	Sara Isakovič (SLO)	Camelia Potec (ROM)	Ágnes Mutina (HUN)
2010 Budapest	Federica Pellegrini (ITA)	Silke Lippok (GER)	Ágnes Mutina (HUN)
2012 Debrecen	Federica Pellegrini (ITA)	Silke Lippok (GER)	Ophélie-Cyrielle Étienne (FRA)
2014 Berlin	Federica Pellegrini (ITA)	Katinka Hosszú (HUN)	Femke Heemskerk (NED)
2016 London	Federica Pellegrini (ITA)	Femke Heemskerk (NED)	Charlotte Bonnet (FRA)
2018 Glasgow	Charlotte Bonnet (FRA)	Femke Heemskerk (NED)	Anastasia Guzhenkova (RUS)
2020 Budapest	Barbora Seemanová (CZE)	Federica Pellegrini (ITA)	Freya Anderson (GBR)
2022 Rome	Marrit Steenbergen (NED)	Freya Anderson (GBR)	Isabel Marie Gose (GER)
2024 Belgrade	Barbora Seemanová (CZE)	Minna Ábrahám (HUN)	Nicole Maier (GER)
2026 Paris	Barbora Seemanová (CZE)	Marrit Steenbergen (NED)	Freya Colbert (GBR)

=== 400 metre ===
Year	Gold	Silver	Bronze
1927 Bologna	Marie Braun (NED)	Marion Laverty (GBR)	Fritzi Löwy (AUT)
1931 Paris	Marie Braun (NED)	Joyce Cooper (GBR)	Yvonne Godard (FRA)
1934 Magdeburg	Rie Mastenbroek (NED)	Willy den Ouden (NED)	Lilli Andersen (DEN)
1938 London	Ragnhild Hveger (DEN)	Rie van Veen (NED)	Fernande Caroen (BEL)
1947 Monte Carlo	Karen Margrete Harup (DEN)	Catherine Gibson (GBR)	Fernande Caroen (BEL)
1950 Vienna	Greta Andersen (DEN)	Irma Heijting-Schuhmacher (NED)	Colette Thomas (FRA)
1954 Turin	Agata Sebö (HUN)	Valéria Gyenge (HUN)	Esa Ligorio (YUG)
1958 Budapest	Jans Koster (NED)	Corrie Schimmel (NED)	Nan Rae (GBR)
1962 Leipzig	Adrie Lasterie (NED)	Ineke Tigelaar (NED)	Elisabeth Ljunggren (SWE)
1966 Utrecht	Claude Mandonnaud (FRA)	Ada Kok (NED)	Tamara Sosnova (URS)
1970 Barcelona	Elke Sehmisch (GDR)	Gunilla Jonsson (SWE)	Karin Tülling (GDR)
1974 Vienna	Angela Franke (GDR)	Cornelia Dörr (GDR)	Novella Calligaris (ITA)
1977 Jönköping	Petra Thümer (GDR)	Annelies Maas (NED)	Barbara Krause (GDR)
1981 Split	Ines Diers (GDR)	Carmela Schmidt (GDR)	Jacquelene Willmott (GBR)
1983 Rome	Astrid Strauss (GDR)	Anke Sonnenbrodt (GDR)	Irina Laricheva (URS)
1985 Sofia	Astrid Strauss (GDR)	Anke Möhring (GDR)	Yelena Dendeberova (URS)
1987 Strasbourg	Heike Friedrich (GDR)	Astrid Strauss (GDR)	Stela Pura (ROM)
1989 Bonn	Anke Möhring (GDR)	Heike Freidrich (GDR)	Manuela Melchiorri (ITA)
1991 Athens	Irene Dalby (NOR)	Beatrice Câșlaru (ROM)	Cristina Sossi (ITA)
1993 Sheffield	Dagmar Hase (GER)	Kerstin Kielgass (GER)	Irene Dalby (NOR)
1995 Vienna	Franziska van Almsick (GER)	Carla Geurts (NED)	Irene Dalby (NOR)
1997 Seville	Dagmar Hase (GER)	Michelle Smith (IRL)	Kerstin Kielgass (GER)
1999 Istanbul	Camelia Potec (ROM)	Kerstin Kielgass (GER)	Yana Klochkova (UKR)
2000 Helsinki	Yana Klochkova (UKR)	Natalya Baranovskaya (BLR)	Camelia Potec (ROM)
2002 Berlin	Yana Klochkova (UKR)	Éva Risztov (HUN)	Camelia Potec (ROM)
2004 Madrid	Laure Manaudou (FRA)	Camelia Potec (ROM)	Yana Klochkova (UKR)
2006 Budapest	Laure Manaudou (FRA)	Joanne Jackson (GBR)	Caitlin McClatchey (GBR)
2008 Eindhoven	Federica Pellegrini (ITA)	Coralie Balmy (FRA)	Camelia Potec (ROM)
2010 Budapest	Rebecca Adlington (GBR)	Ophélie-Cyrielle Étienne (FRA)	Lotte Friis (DEN)
2012 Debrecen	Coralie Balmy (FRA)	Mireia Belmonte García (ESP)	Ophélie-Cyrielle Étienne (FRA)
2014 Berlin	Jazmin Carlin (GBR)	Sharon van Rouwendaal (NED)	Mireia Belmonte García (ESP)
2016 London	Boglárka Kapás (HUN)	Jazmin Carlin (GBR)	Mireia Belmonte García (ESP)
2018 Glasgow	Simona Quadarella (ITA)	Ajna Késely (HUN)	Holly Hibbott (GBR)
2020 Budapest	Simona Quadarella (ITA)	Anna Egorova (RUS)	Boglárka Kapás (HUN)
2022 Rome	Isabel Marie Gose (GER)	Simona Quadarella (ITA)	Ajna Késely (HUN)
2024 Belgrade	Ajna Késely (HUN)	Barbora Seemanová (CZE)	Francisca Martins (POR)
2026 Paris	Simona Quadarella (ITA)	Isabel Gose (GER)	Maya Werner (GER)

=== 800 metre ===
Year	Gold	Silver	Bronze
1970 Barcelona	Karin Neugebauer (GDR)	Linda de Boer (NED)	Novella Calligaris (ITA)
1974 Vienna	Cornelia Dörr (GDR)	Novella Calligaris (ITA)	Gudrun Wegner (GDR)
1977 Jönköping	Petra Thümer (GDR)	Annelies Maas (NED)	Marina Altmann (GDR)
1981 Split	Carmela Schmidt (GDR)	Ines Diers (GDR)	Jacquelene Willmott (GBR)
1983 Rome	Astrid Strauss (GDR)	Anke Sonnenbrodt (GDR)	Sarah Hardcastle (GBR)
1985 Sofia	Astrid Strauss (GDR)	Sarah Hardcastle (GBR)	Anke Möhring (GDR)
1987 Strasbourg	Anke Möhring (GDR)	Astrid Strauss (GDR)	Judith Csabai (HUN)
1989 Bonn	Anke Möhring (GDR)	Astrid Strauss (GDR)	Irene Dalby (NOR)
1991 Athens	Irene Dalby (NOR)	Jana Henke (GER)	Cristina Sossi (ITA)
1993 Sheffield	Jana Henke (GER)	Irene Dalby (NOR)	Olga Šplíchalová (CZE)
1995 Vienna	Julia Jung (GER)	Jana Henke (GER)	Irene Dalby (NOR)
1997 Seville	Kerstin Kielgass (GER)	Carla Geurts (NED)	Jana Henke (GER)
1999 Istanbul	Hannah Stockbauer (GER)	Kirsten Vlieghuis (NED)	Jana Henke (GER)
2000 Helsinki	Flavia Rigamonti (SUI)	Chantal Strasser (SUI)	Kirsten Vlieghuis (NED)
2002 Berlin	Jana Henke (GER)	Éva Risztov (HUN)	Hannah Stockbauer (GER)
2004 Madrid	Erika Villaécija García (ESP)	Anja Čarman (SLO)	Camelia Potec (ROM)
2006 Budapest	Laure Manaudou (FRA)	Rebecca Adlington (GBR)	Rebecca Cooke (GBR)
2008 Eindhoven	Alessia Filippi (ITA)	Erika Villaécija García (ESP)	Camelia Potec (ROM)
2010 Budapest	Lotte Friis (DEN)	Ophélie-Cyrielle Étienne (FRA)	Federica Pellegrini (ITA)
2012 Debrecen	Boglárka Kapás (HUN)	Coralie Balmy (FRA)	Éva Risztov (HUN)
2014 Berlin	Jazmin Carlin (GBR)	Mireia Belmonte Garcia (ESP)	Boglárka Kapás (HUN)
2016 London	Boglárka Kapás (HUN)	Jazmin Carlin (GBR)	Tjasa Oder (SLO)
2018 Glasgow	Simona Quadarella (ITA)	Ajna Késely (HUN)	Anna Egorova (RUS)
2020 Budapest	Simona Quadarella (ITA)	Anastasiya Kirpichnikova (RUS)	Anna Egorova (RUS)
2022 Rome	Simona Quadarella (ITA)	Isabel Marie Gose (GER)	Merve Tuncel (TUR)
2024 Belgrade	Ajna Késely (HUN)	Fleur Lewis (GBR)	Deniz Ertan (TUR)
2026 Paris	Simona Quadarella (ITA)	Isabel Gose (GER)	Maya Werner (GER)

=== 1500 metre ===
Year	Gold	Silver	Bronze
2008 Eindhoven	Flavia Rigamonti (SUI)	Erika Villaécija García (ESP)	Lotte Friis (DEN)
2010 Budapest	Lotte Friis (DEN)	Gráinne Murphy (IRL)	Erika Villaécija García (ESP)
2012 Debrecen	Mireia Belmonte García (ESP)	Éva Risztov (HUN)	Erika Villaécija García (ESP)
2014 Berlin	Mireia Belmonte García (ESP)	Boglárka Kapás (HUN)	Martina Caramignoli (ITA)
2016 London	Boglárka Kapás (HUN)	Mireia Belmonte García (ESP)	María Vilas (ESP)
2018 Glasgow	Simona Quadarella (ITA)	Sarah Köhler (GER)	Ajna Késely (HUN)
2020 Budapest	Simona Quadarella (ITA)	Anastasiya Kirpichnikova (RUS)	Martina Caramignoli (ITA)
2022 Rome	Simona Quadarella (ITA)	Viktória Mihályvári-Farkas (HUN)	Martina Caramignoli (ITA)
2024 Belgrade	Vivien Jackl (HUN)	Celine Rieder (GER)	Fleur Lewis (GBR)
2026 Paris	Simona Quadarella (ITA)	Isabel Gose (GER)	Maya Werner (GER)

== Backstroke ==
=== 50 metre ===
Year	Gold	Silver	Bronze
1999 Istanbul	Sandra Völker (GER)	Nina Zhivanevskaya (ESP)	Metka Šparovec (SLO)
2000 Helsinki	Nina Zhivanevskaya (ESP)	Diana Mocanu (ROM)	Ilona Hlaváčková (CZE)
2002 Berlin	Nina Zhivanevskaya (ESP)	Sandra Völker (GER)	Aleksandra Gerasimenya (BLR)
2004 Madrid	Ilona Hlaváčková (CZE)	Nina Zhivanevskaya (ESP)	Alessandra Cappa (ITA)
2006 Budapest	Janine Pietsch (GER)	Aleksandra Gerasimenya (BLR)	Antje Buschschulte (GER)
2008 Eindhoven	Anastasia Zuyeva (RUS)	Nina Zhivanevskaya (ESP)	Sanja Jovanović (CRO)
2010 Budapest	Aleksandra Gerasimenya (BLR)	Daniela Samulski (GER)	Mercedes Peris (ESP)
2012 Debrecen	Mercedes Peris (ESP)	Arianna Barbieri (ITA)	Sanja Jovanović (CRO)
2014 Berlin	Francesca Halsall (GBR)	Georgia Davies (GBR)	Mie Nielsen (DEN)
2016 London	Francesca Halsall (GBR)	Mie Nielsen (DEN)	Georgia Davies (GBR)
2018 Glasgow	Georgia Davies (GBR)	Anastasia Fesikova (RUS)	Mimosa Jallow (FIN)
2020 Budapest	Kira Toussaint (NED)	Kathleen Dawson (GBR)	Maaike de Waard (NED)
2022 Rome	Analia Pigrée (FRA)	Silvia Scalia (ITA)	Maaike de Waard (NED)
2024 Belgrade	Danielle Hill (IRE)	Theodora Drakou (GRE)	Adela Piskorska (POL)
2026 Paris	Sara Curtis (ITA)	Mary-Ambre Moluh (FRA)	Lauren Cox (GBR)

=== 100 metre ===
Year	Gold	Silver	Bronze
1927 Bologna	Willy den Turk (NED)	Marie Braun (NED)	Phyllis Harding (GBR)
1931 Paris	Marie Braun (NED)	Joyce Cooper (GBR)	Phyllis Harding (GBR)
1934 Magdeburg	Rie Mastenbroek (NED)	Gisela Arendt (GER)	Puck Oversloot (NED)
1938 London	Cor Kint (NED)	Iet van Feggelen (NED)	Birte Ove-Petersen (DEN)
1947 Monte Carlo	Karen Margrete Harup (DEN)	Catherine Gibson (GBR)	Iet van Feggelen (NED)
1950 Vienna	Ria van der Horst (NED)	Gertrud Herrbruck (FRG)	Greetje Gaillard (NED)
1954 Turin	Geertje Wielema (NED)	Joke de Korte (NED)	Pat Symons (GBR)
1958 Budapest	Judy Grinham (GBR)	Margaret Edwards (GBR)	Larisa Viktorova (URS)
1962 Leipzig	Ria van Velsen (NED)	Corrie Winkel (NED)	Veronika Holletz (GDR)
1966 Utrecht	Christine Caron (FRA)	Linda Ludgrove (GBR)	Cristina Balaban (ROM)
1970 Barcelona	Tinatin Lekveishvili (URS)	Andrea Gyarmati (HUN)	Cobie Buter (NED)
1974 Vienna	Ulrike Richter (GDR)	Ulrike Tauber (GDR)	Enith Brigitha (NED)
1977 Jönköping	Birgit Treiber (GDR)	Ulrike Richter (GDR)	Kaire Indrikson (URS)
1981 Split	Ina Kleber (GDR)	Cornelia Polit (GDR)	Carmen Bunaciu (ROM)
1983 Rome	Ina Kleber (GDR)	Cornelia Sirch (GDR)	Carmen Bunaciu (ROM)
1985 Sofia	Birte Weigang (GDR)	Kathrin Zimmermann (GDR)	Natalya Shibayeva (URS)
1987 Strasbourg	Kristin Otto (GDR)	Svenja Schlicht (FRG)	Kathrin Zimmermann (GDR)
1989 Bonn	Kristin Otto (GDR)	Krisztina Egerszegi (HUN)	Anja Eichhorst (GDR)
1991 Athens	Krisztina Egerszegi (HUN)	Tünde Szabó (HUN)	Dagmar Hase (GER)
1993 Sheffield	Krisztina Egerszegi (HUN)	Nina Zhivanevskaya (RUS)	Sandra Völker (GER)
1995 Vienna	Mette Jacobsen (DEN)	Cathleen Rund (GER)	Nina Zhivanevskaya (RUS)
1997 Seville	Antje Buschschulte (GER)	Roxana Maracineanu (FRA)	Sandra Völker (GER)
1999 Istanbul	Sandra Völker (GER)	Nina Zhivanevskaya (ESP)	Roxana Maracineanu (FRA)
2000 Helsinki	Nina Zhivanevskaya (ESP)	Diana Mocanu (ROM)	Louise Ørnstedt (DEN)
2002 Berlin	Stanislava Komarova (RUS)	Sandra Völker (GER)	Antje Buschschulte (GER)
2004 Madrid	Laure Manaudou (FRA)	Stanislava Komarova (RUS)	Nina Zhivanevskaya (ESP)
2006 Budapest	Laure Manaudou (FRA)	Antje Buschschulte (GER)	Janine Pietsch (GER)
2008 Eindhoven	Anastasia Zuyeva (RUS)	Laure Manaudou (FRA)	Nina Zhivanevskaya (ESP)
2010 Budapest	Gemma Spofforth (GBR)	Elizabeth Simmonds (GBR)	Jenny Mensing (GER)
2012 Debrecen	Jenny Mensing (GER)	Arianna Barbieri (ITA)	Simona Baumrtová (CZE)
2014 Berlin	Katinka Hosszú (HUN)	none awarded	Georgia Davies (GBR)
2014 Berlin	Mie Nielsen (DEN)	none awarded	Georgia Davies (GBR)
2016 London	Mie Nielsen (DEN)	Katinka Hosszú (HUN)	Kathleen Dawson (GBR)
2018 Glasgow	Anastasia Fesikova (RUS)	Georgia Davies (GBR)	Carlotta Zofkova (ITA)
2020 Budapest	Kathleen Dawson (GBR)	Margherita Panziera (ITA)	Maria Kameneva (RUS)
2022 Rome	Margherita Panziera (ITA)	Medi Harris (GBR)	Kira Toussaint (NED)
2024 Belgrade	Adela Piskorska (POL)	Danielle Hill (IRE)	Roos Vanotterdijk (BEL)
2026 Paris	Mary-Ambre Moluh (FRA)	Marrit Steenbergen (NED)	Pauline Mahieu (FRA)

=== 200 metre ===
Year	Gold	Silver	Bronze
1970 Barcelona	Andrea Gyarmati (HUN)	Barbara Hofmeister (GDR)	Tinatin Lekveishvili (URS)
1974 Vienna	Ulrike Richter (GDR)	Ulrike Tauber (GDR)	Enith Brigitha (NED)
1977 Jönköping	Birgit Treiber (GDR)	Ulrike Richter (GDR)	Carmen Bunaciu (ROM)
1981 Split	Cornelia Polit (GDR)	Jolanda de Rover (NED)	Larisa Gorchakova (URS)
1983 Rome	Cornelia Sirch (GDR)	Katrin Zimmermann (GDR)	Larisa Gorchakova (URS)
1985 Sofia	Cornelia Sirch (GDR)	Kathrin Zimmermann (GDR)	Jolanda de Rover (NED)
1987 Strasbourg	Cornelia Sirch (GDR)	Kathrin Zimmermann (GDR)	Svenja Schlicht (FRG)
1989 Bonn	Dagmar Hase (GDR)	Krisztina Egerszegi (HUN)	Kristin Otto (GDR)
1991 Athens	Krisztina Egerszegi (HUN)	Tünde Szabó (HUN)	Dagmar Hase (GER)
1993 Sheffield	Krisztina Egerszegi (HUN)	Lorenza Vigarani (ITA)	Nina Zhivanevskaya (RUS)
1995 Vienna	Krisztina Egerszegi (HUN)	Dagmar Hase (GER)	Cathleen Rund (GER)
1997 Seville	Cathleen Rund (GER)	Antje Buschschulte (GER)	Roxana Maracineanu (FRA)
1999 Istanbul	Roxana Maracineanu (FRA)	Yuliya Fomenko (RUS)	none awarded
1999 Istanbul	Roxana Maracineanu (FRA)	Cathleen Rund (GER)	none awarded
2000 Helsinki	Nina Zhivanevskaya (ESP)	Diana Mocanu (ROM)	Antje Buschschulte (GER)
2002 Berlin	Stanislava Komarova (RUS)	Nina Zhivanevskaya (ESP)	Irina Amshennikova (UKR)
2004 Madrid	Stanislava Komarova (RUS)	Anja Čarman (SLO)	Sanja Jovanović (CRO)
2006 Budapest	Esther Baron (FRA)	Irina Amshennikova (UKR)	Melanie Marshall (GBR)
2008 Eindhoven	Laure Manaudou (FRA)	Anastasia Zuyeva (RUS)	Nikolett Szepesi (HUN)
2010 Budapest	Elizabeth Simmonds (GBR)	Gemma Spofforth (GBR)	Duane Da Rocha (ESP)
2012 Debrecen	Alexianne Castel (FRA)	Jenny Mensing (GER)	Duane Da Rocha (ESP)
2014 Berlin	Duane Da Rocha (ESP)	Elizabeth Simmonds (GBR)	Daria Ustinova (RUS)
2016 London	Katinka Hosszú (HUN)	Daryna Zevina (UKR)	Matea Samardžić (CRO)
2018 Glasgow	Margherita Panziera (ITA)	Daria Ustinova (RUS)	Katalin Burián (HUN)
2020 Budapest	Margherita Panziera (ITA)	Cassie Wild (GBR)	Katalin Burián (HUN)
2022 Rome	Margherita Panziera (ITA)	Katie Shanahan (GBR)	Dóra Molnár (HUN)
2024 Belgrade	Camila Rebelo (POR)	Dóra Molnár (HUN)	Eszter Szabó-Feltóthy (HUN)
2026 Paris	Katie Shanahan (GBR)	Camila Rebelo (POR)	Pauline Mahieu (FRA)

== Breaststroke ==
=== 50 metre ===
Year	Gold	Silver	Bronze
1999 Istanbul	Ágnes Kovács (HUN)	Zoë Baker (GBR)	Janne Schäfer (GER)
2000 Helsinki	Ágnes Kovács (HUN)	Zoë Baker (GBR)	Sylvia Gerasch (GER)
2002 Berlin	Emma Igelström (SWE)	Svitlana Bondarenko (UKR)	Yelena Bogomazova (RUS)
2004 Madrid	Maria Östling (SWE)	Yelena Bogomazova (RUS)	Majken Thorup (DEN)
2006 Budapest	Yelena Bogomazova (RUS)	Kate Haywood (GBR)	Ágnes Kovács (HUN)
2008 Eindhoven	Janne Schäfer (GER)	Yuliya Yefimova (RUS)	Mirna Jukić (AUT)
2010 Budapest	Yuliya Yefimova (RUS)	Kate Haywood (GBR)	Jennie Johansson (SWE)
2012 Debrecen	Petra Chocová (CZE)	Sycerika McMahon (IRL)	Caroline Ruhnau (GER)
2014 Berlin	Rūta Meilutytė (LTU)	Jennie Johansson (SWE)	Moniek Nijhuis (NED)
2016 London	Jennie Johansson (SWE)	Hrafnhildur Lúthersdóttir (ISL)	Jenna Laukkanen (FIN)
2018 Glasgow	Yuliya Yefimova (RUS)	Imogen Clark (GBR)	Arianna Castiglioni (ITA)
2020 Budapest	Benedetta Pilato (ITA)	Ida Hulkko (FIN)	Yuliya Yefimova (RUS)
2022 Rome	Rūta Meilutytė (LTU)	Benedetta Pilato (ITA)	Imogen Clark (GBR)
2024 Belgrade	Dominika Sztandera (POL)	Veera Kivirinta (FIN)	Olivia Klint Ipsa (SWE)
2026 Paris	Rūta Meilutytė (LTU)	Benedetta Pilato (ITA)	Mona McSharry (IRL)

=== 100 metre ===
Year	Gold	Silver	Bronze
1970 Barcelona	Galina Prozumenshchikova (URS)	Uta Frommater (FRG)	Alla Grebennikova (URS)
1974 Vienna	Christel Justen (FRG)	Renate Vogel (GDR)	Ágnes Kaczander (HUN)
1977 Jönköping	Yuliya Bogdanova (URS)	Carola Nitschke (GDR)	Ramona Reinke (GDR)
1981 Split	Ute Geweniger (GDR)	Suki Brownsdon (GBR)	Larisa Belokon (URS)
1983 Rome	Ute Geweniger (GDR)	Sylvia Gerasch (GDR)	Tanya Bogomilova (BUL)
1985 Sofia	Sylvia Gerasch (GDR)	Silke Hörner (GDR)	Tanya Bogomilova (BUL)
1987 Strasbourg	Silke Hörner (GDR)	Manuela Dalla Valle (ITA)	Sylvia Gerasch (GDR)
1989 Bonn	Susanne Börnike (GDR)	Tanya Dangalakova (BUL)	Manuela Dalla Valle (ITA)
1991 Athens	Yelena Rudkovskaya (URS)	Svitlana Bondarenko (URS)	Tanya Dangalakova (BUL)
1993 Sheffield	Sylvia Gerasch (GER)	Svitlana Bondarenko (UKR)	Yelena Rudkovskaya (BLR)
1995 Vienna	Brigitte Becue (BEL)	Svitlana Bondarenko (UKR)	Ágnes Kovács (HUN)
1997 Seville	Ágnes Kovács (HUN)	Svitlana Bondarenko (UKR)	Brigitte Becue (BEL)
1999 Istanbul	Ágnes Kovács (HUN)	Svitlana Bondarenko (UKR)	Brigitte Becue (BEL)
2000 Helsinki	Ágnes Kovács (HUN)	Sylvia Gerasch (GER)	Svitlana Bondarenko (UKR)
2002 Berlin	Emma Igelström (SWE)	Svitlana Bondarenko (UKR)	Yelena Bogomazova (RUS)
2004 Madrid	Svitlana Bondarenko (UKR)	Yelena Bogomazova (RUS)	Mirna Jukić (AUT)
2006 Budapest	Ganna Khlystunova (UKR)	Kirsty Balfour (GBR)	Ágnes Kovács (HUN)
2008 Eindhoven	Mirna Jukić (AUT)	Alena Alekseeva (RUS)	Joline Höstman (SWE)
2010 Budapest	Yuliya Yefimova (RUS)	Rikke Møller Pedersen (DEN)	none awarded
2010 Budapest	Yuliya Yefimova (RUS)	Jennie Johansson (SWE)	none awarded
2012 Debrecen	Sarah Poewe (GER)	Jennie Johansson (SWE)	Marina Garcia Urzainqui (ESP)
2014 Berlin	Rikke Møller Pedersen (DEN)	Jennie Johansson (SWE)	Arianna Castiglioni (ITA)
2016 London	Rūta Meilutytė (LTU)	Hrafnhildur Lúthersdóttir (ISL)	Chloe Tutton (GBR)
2018 Glasgow	Yuliya Yefimova (RUS)	Rūta Meilutytė (LTU)	Arianna Castiglioni (ITA)
2020 Budapest	Sophie Hansson (SWE)	Arianna Castiglioni (ITA)	Martina Carraro (ITA)
2022 Rome	Benedetta Pilato (ITA)	Lisa Angiolini (ITA)	Rūta Meilutytė (LTU)
2024 Belgrade	Eneli Jefimova (EST)	Lisa Mamié (SUI)	Olivia Klint Ipsa (SWE)
2026 Paris	Angharad Evans (GBR)	Mona McSharry (IRL)	Benedetta Pilato (ITA)

=== 200 metre ===
Year	Gold	Silver	Bronze
1927 Bologna	Hildegard Schrader (GER)	Charlotte Mühe (GER)	Hedy Bienenfeld (AUT)
1931 Paris	Cecelia Wolstenholme (GBR)	Jenny Kastein (NED)	Margery Hinton (GBR)
1934 Magdeburg	Martha Genenger (GER)	Hanni Hölzner (GER)	Inger Kragh (DEN)
1938 London	Inge Sørensen (DEN)	Doris Storey (GBR)	Jopie Waalberg (NED)
1947 Monte Carlo	Nel van Vliet (NED)	Éva Székely (HUN)	Jannie de Groot (NED)
1950 Vienna	Raymonde Vergauwen (BEL)	Lies Bonnier (NED)	Jannie de Groot (NED)
1954 Turin	Ursula Happe (FRG)	Jytte Hansen (DEN)	Klara Killerman (HUN)
1958 Budapest	Ada den Haan (NED)	Anita Lonsbrough (GBR)	Wiltrud Urselman (FRG)
1962 Leipzig	Anita Lonsbrough (GBR)	Klenie Bimolt (NED)	Ursula Küper (GDR)
1966 Utrecht	Galina Prozumenshchikova (URS)	Irina Pozdnyakova (URS)	Jill Slattery (GBR)
1970 Barcelona	Galina Prozumenshchikova (URS)	Alla Grebennikova (URS)	Dorothy Harrison (GBR)
1974 Vienna	Karla Linke (GDR)	Anne-Katrin Schott (GDR)	Marina Yurchenya (URS)
1977 Jönköping	Yuliya Bogdanova (URS)	Susanne Nielsson (DEN)	Eva-Marie Håkansson (SWE)
1981 Split	Ute Geweniger (GDR)	Larisa Belokon (URS)	Grazyna Dziedzic (POL)
1983 Rome	Ute Geweniger (GDR)	Sylvia Gerasch (GDR)	Olga Zelenkova (URS)
1985 Sofia	Tanya Bogomilova (BUL)	Sylvia Gerasch (GDR)	Silke Hörner (GDR)
1987 Strasbourg	Silke Hörner (GDR)	Ingrid Lempereur (BEL)	Svetlana Kuzmina (URS)
1989 Bonn	Susanne Börnike (GDR)	Brigitte Becue (BEL)	Yelena Volkova (URS)
1991 Athens	Yelena Rudkovskaya (URS)	Beatrice Câșlaru (ROM)	Tanya Dangalakova (BUL)
1993 Sheffield	Brigitte Becue (BEL)	Anna Nikitina (RUS)	Marie Hardiman (GBR)
1995 Vienna	Brigitte Becue (BEL)	Svitlana Bondarenko (UKR)	Alicja Pęczak (POL)
1997 Seville	Ágnes Kovács (HUN)	Alicja Pęczak (POL)	Brigitte Becue (BEL)
1999 Istanbul	Ágnes Kovács (HUN)	Beatrice Câșlaru (ROM)	Alicja Pęczak (POL)
2000 Helsinki	Beatrice Câșlaru (ROM)	Ágnes Kovács (HUN)	Karine Brémond (FRA)
2002 Berlin	Mirna Jukić (AUT)	Anne Poleska (GER)	Emma Igelström (SWE)
2004 Madrid	Mirna Jukić (AUT)	Alenka Kejžar (SLO)	Yelena Bogomazova (RUS)
2006 Budapest	Kirsty Balfour (GBR)	Yuliya Pidlisna (UKR)	Ágnes Kovács (HUN)
2008 Eindhoven	Yuliya Yefimova (RUS)	Mirna Jukić (AUT)	Alena Alekseeva (RUS)
2010 Budapest	Anastasia Chaun (RUS)	Sara Nordenstam (NOR)	Rikke Møller Pedersen (DEN)
2012 Debrecen	Sara Nordenstam (NOR)	Irina Novikova (RUS)	Sarah Poewe (GER)
2014 Berlin	Rikke Møller Pedersen (DEN)	Molly Renshaw (GBR)	Jessica Vall (ESP)
2016 London	Rikke Møller Pedersen (DEN)	Jessica Vall (ESP)	Hrafnhildur Lúthersdóttir (ISL)
2018 Glasgow	Yuliya Yefimova (RUS)	Jessica Vall (ESP)	Molly Renshaw (GBR)
2020 Budapest	Molly Renshaw (GBR)	Lisa Mamié (SUI)	Yuliya Yefimova (RUS)
2022 Rome	Lisa Mamié (SUI)	Martina Carraro (ITA)	Kotryna Teterevkova (LTU)
2024 Belgrade	Kristýna Horská (CZE)	Clara Rybak-Andersen (DEN)	Lisa Mamié (SUI)
2026 Paris	Evgeniia Chikunova NAB	Angharad Evans (GBR)	Mona McSharry (IRL)

== Butterfly ==
=== 50 metre ===
Year	Gold	Silver	Bronze
1999 Istanbul	Anna-Karin Kammerling (SWE)	Johanna Sjöberg (SWE)	Chantal Groot (NED)
2000 Helsinki	Anna-Karin Kammerling (SWE)	Karen Egdal (DEN)	Martina Moravcová (SVK)
2002 Berlin	Anna-Karin Kammerling (SWE)	Daniela Samulski (GER)	Chantal Groot (NED)
2004 Madrid	Natalya Sutyagina (RUS)	Martina Moravcová (SVK)	Chantal Groot (NED)
2006 Budapest	Therese Alshammar (SWE)	Anna-Karin Kammerling (SWE)	Chantal Groot (NED)
2008 Eindhoven	Chantal Groot (NED)	Inge Dekker (NED)	Sviatlana Khakhlova (BLR)
2010 Budapest	Therese Alshammar (SWE)	Jeanette Ottesen (DEN)	Mélanie Henique (FRA)
2012 Debrecen	Sarah Sjöström (SWE)	Triin Aljand (EST)	Ingvild Snildal (NOR)
2014 Berlin	Sarah Sjöström (SWE)	Jeanette Ottesen (DEN)	Francesca Halsall (GBR)
2016 London	Sarah Sjöström (SWE)	Jeanette Ottesen (DEN)	Francesca Halsall (GBR)
2018 Glasgow	Sarah Sjöström (SWE)	Emilie Beckmann (DEN)	Kimberly Buys (BEL)
2020 Budapest	Ranomi Kromowidjojo (NED)	Mélanie Henique (FRA)	Emilie Beckmann (DEN)
2022 Rome	Sarah Sjöström (SWE)	Marie Wattel (FRA)	Maaike de Waard (NED)
2024 Belgrade	Sara Junevik (SWE)	Roos Vanotterdijk (BEL)	Anna Ntountounaki (GRE)
2026 Paris	Sarah Sjöström (SWE)	Roos Vanotterdijk (BEL)	Sara Junevik (SWE)

=== 100 metre ===
Year	Gold	Silver	Bronze
1954 Turin	Jutta Langenau (GDR)	Maria Littomeritzky (HUN)	Ursula Happe (FRG)
1958 Budapest	Tineke Lagerberg (NED)	Atie Voorbij (NED)	Marta Skupilová (TCH)
1962 Leipzig	Ada Kok (NED)	Ute Noack (GDR)	Marianne Heemskerk (NED)
1966 Utrecht	Ada Kok (NED)	Heike Hustede (FRG)	Eila Pyrhönen (FIN)
1970 Barcelona	Andrea Gyarmati (HUN)	Helga Lindner (GDR)	Edeltraut Koch (FRG)
1974 Vienna	Rosemarie Kother (GDR)	Anne-Katrin Leucht (GDR)	Gunilla Andersson (SWE)
1977 Jönköping	Andrea Pollack (GDR)	Christiane Knacke (GDR)	Ineke Ran (NED)
1981 Split	Ute Geweniger (GDR)	Ines Geissler (GDR)	Karin Seick (FRG)
1983 Rome	Ines Geissler (GDR)	Cornelia Polit (GDR)	Cinzia Savi Scarponi (ITA)
1985 Sofia	Kornelia Gressler (GDR)	Birte Weigang (GDR)	Tatyana Kurnikova (URS)
1987 Strasbourg	Kristin Otto (GDR)	Birte Weigang (GDR)	Catherine Plewinski (FRA)
1989 Bonn	Catherine Plewinski (FRA)	Jacqueline Jacob (GDR)	Kathleen Nord (GDR)
1991 Athens	Catherine Plewinski (FRA)	Inge de Bruijn (NED)	Therèse Lundin (SWE)
1993 Sheffield	Catherine Plewinski (FRA)	Franziska van Almsick (GER)	Bettina Ustrowski (GER)
1995 Vienna	Mette Jacobsen (DEN)	Ilaria Tocchini (ITA)	Cécile Jeanson (FRA)
1997 Seville	Mette Jacobsen (DEN)	Martina Moravcová (SVK)	Johanna Sjöberg (SWE)
1999 Istanbul	Inge de Bruijn (NED)	Johanna Sjöberg (SWE)	Diana Mocanu (ROM)
2000 Helsinki	Martina Moravcová (SVK)	Otylia Jędrzejczak (POL)	Johanna Sjöberg (SWE)
2002 Berlin	Martina Moravcová (SVK)	Otylia Jędrzejczak (POL)	Anna-Karin Kammerling (SWE)
2004 Madrid	Martina Moravcová (SVK)	Malia Metella (FRA)	Otylia Jędrzejczak (POL)
2006 Budapest	Inge Dekker (NED)	Martina Moravcová (SVK)	Alena Popchanka (FRA)
2008 Eindhoven	Sarah Sjöström (SWE)	Inge Dekker (NED)	Aurore Mongel (FRA)
2010 Budapest	Sarah Sjöström (SWE)	Francesca Halsall (GBR)	Therese Alshammar (SWE)
2012 Debrecen	Ingvild Snildal (NOR)	Martina Granström (SWE)	Amit Ivri (ISR)
2014 Berlin	Jeanette Ottesen (DEN)	Sarah Sjöström (SWE)	Ilaria Bianchi (ITA)
2016 London	Sarah Sjöström (SWE)	Jeanette Ottesen (DEN)	Ilaria Bianchi (ITA)
2018 Glasgow	Sarah Sjöström (SWE)	Svetlana Chimrova (RUS)	Elena Di Liddo (ITA)
2020 Budapest	Anna Ntountounaki (GRE) Marie Wattel (FRA)	none awarded	Louise Hansson (SWE)
2022 Rome	Louise Hansson (SWE)	Marie Wattel (FRA)	Lana Pudar (BIH)
2024 Belgrade	Roos Vanotterdijk (BEL)	Georgia Damasioti (GRE)	Sara Junevik (SWE)
2026 Paris	Roos Vanotterdijk (BEL)	Angelina Köhler (GER)	Daria Klepikova NAB

=== 200 metre ===
Year	Gold	Silver	Bronze
1970 Barcelona	Helga Lindner (GDR)	Mirjana Šegrt (YUG)	Evelyn Stolze (GDR)
1974 Vienna	Rosemarie Kother (GDR)	Anne-Katrin Leucht (GDR)	Barbara Schwarzfeldt (FRG)
1977 Jönköping	Anett Fiebig (GDR)	Andrea Pollack (GDR)	Susan Jenner (GBR)
1981 Split	Ines Geissler (GDR)	Heike Dähne (GDR)	Agnieszka Czopek (POL)
1983 Rome	Cornelia Polit (GDR)	Ines Geissler (GDR)	Conny van Bentum (NED)
1985 Sofia	Jacqueline Alex (GDR)	Kornelia Gressler (GDR)	Petra Zindler (FRG)
1987 Strasbourg	Kathleen Nord (GDR)	Birte Weigang (GDR)	Stela Pura (ROM)
1989 Bonn	Kathleen Nord (GDR)	Jacqueline Jacob (GDR)	Mette Jacobsen (DEN)
1991 Athens	Mette Jacobsen (DEN)	Sabine Herbst (GER)	Berit Puggard (DEN)
1993 Sheffield	Krisztina Egerszegi (HUN)	Katrin Jäke (GER)	Bárbara Franco (ESP)
1995 Vienna	Michelle Smith (IRL)	Mette Jacobsen (DEN)	Sophia Skou (DEN)
1997 Seville	María Peláez (ESP)	Michelle Smith (IRL)	Mette Jacobsen (DEN)
1999 Istanbul	Mette Jacobsen (DEN)	María Peláez (ESP)	Otylia Jędrzejczak (POL)
2000 Helsinki	Otylia Jędrzejczak (POL)	Mette Jacobsen (DEN)	Mireia García (ESP)
2002 Berlin	Otylia Jędrzejczak (POL)	Éva Risztov (HUN)	Annika Mehlhorn (GER)
2004 Madrid	Otylia Jędrzejczak (POL)	Paola Cavallino (ITA)	Mette Jacobsen (DEN)
2006 Budapest	Otylia Jędrzejczak (POL)	Francesca Segat (ITA)	Caterina Giacchetti (ITA)
2008 Eindhoven	Aurore Mongel (FRA)	Emese Kovács (HUN)	Mireia Belmonte García (ESP)
2010 Budapest	Katinka Hosszú (HUN)	Zsuzsanna Jakabos (HUN)	Ellen Gandy (GBR)
2012 Debrecen	Katinka Hosszú (HUN)	Zsuzsanna Jakabos (HUN)	Martina Granström (SWE)
2014 Berlin	Mireia Belmonte García (ESP)	Judit Ignacio (ESP)	Katinka Hosszú (HUN)
2016 London	Franziska Hentke (GER)	Liliána Szilágyi (HUN)	Judit Ignacio (ESP)
2018 Glasgow	Boglárka Kapás (HUN)	Svetlana Chimrova (RUS)	Alys Thomas (GBR)
2020 Budapest	Boglárka Kapás (HUN)	Katinka Hosszú (HUN)	Svetlana Chimrova (RUS)
2022 Rome	Lana Pudar (BIH)	Helena Rosendahl Bach (DEN)	Ilaria Cusinato (ITA)
2024 Belgrade	Helena Rosendahl Bach (DEN)	Lana Pudar (BIH)	Boglárka Telegdy Kapás (HUN)
2026 Paris	Keanna MacInnes (GBR)	Helena Rosendahl Bach (DEN)	Laura Cabanes (ESP)

== Individual Medley ==
=== 200 metre ===
Year	Gold	Silver	Bronze
1970 Barcelona	Martina Grunert (GDR)	Evelyn Stolze (GDR)	Shelagh Ratcliffe (GBR)
1974 Vienna	Ulrike Tauber (GDR)	Andrea Hübner (GDR)	Irina Fetisova (URS)
1977 Jönköping	Ulrike Tauber (GDR)	Sabine Kahle (GDR)	Olga Klevakina (URS)
1981 Split	Ute Geweniger (GDR)	Petra Schneider (GDR)	Olga Klevakina (URS)
1983 Rome	Ute Geweniger (GDR)	Kathleen Nord (GDR)	Irina Gerasimova (URS)
1985 Sofia	Kathleen Nord (GDR)	Sonia Blagoeva (BUL)	Susanne Börnike (GDR)
1987 Strasbourg	Cornelia Sirch (GDR)	Daniela Hunger (GDR)	Noemi Lung (ROM)
1989 Bonn	Daniela Hunger (GDR)	Marianne Muis (NED)	Mildred Muis (NED)
1991 Athens	Daniela Hunger (GER)	Beatrice Câșlaru (ROM)	Marion Zoller (GER)
1993 Sheffield	Daniela Hunger (GER)	Darya Shmeleva (RUS)	Silvia Parera (ESP)
1995 Vienna	Michelle Smith (IRL)	Brigitte Becue (BEL)	Alicja Pęczak (POL)
1997 Seville	Oxana Verevka (RUS)	Martina Moravcová (SVK)	Yana Klochkova (UKR)
1999 Istanbul	Yana Klochkova (UKR)	Beatrice Câșlaru (ROM)	Sabine Herbst (GER)
2000 Helsinki	Yana Klochkova (UKR)	none awarded	Sue Rolph (GBR)
2000 Helsinki	Beatrice Câșlaru (ROM)	none awarded	Sue Rolph (GBR)
2002 Berlin	Yana Klochkova (UKR)	Hanna Shcherba (BLR)	Alenka Kejžar (SLO)
2004 Madrid	Yana Klochkova (UKR)	Hanna Shcherba (BLR)	Beatrice Câșlaru (ROM)
2006 Budapest	Laure Manaudou (FRA)	Katarzyna Baranowska (POL)	Alessia Filippi (ITA)
2008 Eindhoven	Mireia Belmonte García (ESP)	Evelyn Verrasztó (HUN)	Camille Muffat (FRA)
2010 Budapest	Katinka Hosszú (HUN)	Evelyn Verrasztó (HUN)	Hannah Miley (GBR)
2012 Debrecen	Katinka Hosszú (HUN)	Sophie Allen (GBR)	Evelyn Verrasztó (HUN)
2014 Berlin	Katinka Hosszú (HUN)	Aimee Willmott (GBR)	Lisa Zaiser (AUT)
2016 London	Katinka Hosszú (HUN)	Siobhan-Marie O'Connor (GBR)	Hannah Miley (GBR)
2018 Glasgow	Katinka Hosszú (HUN)	Ilaria Cusinato (ITA)	Maria Ugolkova (SUI)
2020 Budapest	Anastasia Gorbenko (ISR)	Abbie Wood (GBR)	Katinka Hosszú (HUN)
2022 Rome	Anastasia Gorbenko (ISR)	Marrit Steenbergen (NED)	Sara Franceschi (ITA)
2024 Belgrade	Anastasia Gorbenko (ISR)	Lea Polonsky (ISR)	Barbora Seemanová (CZE)
2026 Paris	Ellen Walshe (IRL)	Anita Gastaldi (ITA)	Roos Vanotterdijk (BEL)

=== 400 metre ===
Year	Gold	Silver	Bronze
1962 Leipzig	Adrie Lasterie (NED)	Anita Lonsbrough (GBR)	Márta Egerváry (HUN)
1966 Utrecht	Betty Heukels (NED)	Heidi Pechstein (GDR)	Lyudmila Khazieva (URS)
1970 Barcelona	Evelyn Stolze (GDR)	Brigitte Schuchardt (GDR)	Shelagh Ratcliffe (GBR)
1974 Vienna	Ulrike Tauber (GDR)	Gudrun Wegner (GDR)	Susan Richardson (GBR)
1977 Jönköping	Ulrike Tauber (GDR)	Sabine Kahle (GDR)	Sharron Davies (GBR)
1981 Split	Petra Schneider (GDR)	Ute Geweniger (GDR)	Agnieszka Czopek (POL)
1983 Rome	Kathleen Nord (GDR)	Petra Schneider (GDR)	Petra Zindler (FRG)
1985 Sofia	Kathleen Nord (GDR)	Cornelia Sirch (GDR)	Sonia Blagoeva (BUL)
1987 Strasbourg	Noemi Lung (ROM)	Yelena Dendeberova (URS)	Kathleen Nord (GDR)
1989 Bonn	Daniela Hunger (GDR)	Krisztina Egerszegi (HUN)	Grit Müller (GDR)
1991 Athens	Krisztina Egerszegi (HUN)	Beatrice Câșlaru (ROM)	Ewa Synowska (POL)
1993 Sheffield	Krisztina Egerszegi (HUN)	Darya Shmeleva (RUS)	Hana Černá (CZE)
1995 Vienna	Krisztina Egerszegi (HUN)	Michelle Smith (IRL)	Cathleen Rund (GER)
1997 Seville	Michelle Smith (IRL)	Yana Klochkova (UKR)	Hana Černá (CZE)
1999 Istanbul	Yana Klochkova (UKR)	Beatrice Câșlaru (ROM)	Hana Černá (CZE)
2000 Helsinki	Yana Klochkova (UKR)	Beatrice Câșlaru (ROM)	Yseult Gervy (BEL)
2002 Berlin	Yana Klochkova (UKR)	Éva Risztov (HUN)	Nicole Hetzer (GER)
2004 Madrid	Yana Klochkova (UKR)	Éva Risztov (HUN)	Anja Klinar (SLO)
2006 Budapest	Alessia Filippi (ITA)	Nicole Hetzer (GER)	Katarzyna Baranowska (POL)
2008 Eindhoven	Alessia Filippi (ITA)	Katinka Hosszú (HUN)	Yana Martynova (RUS)
2010 Budapest	Hannah Miley (GBR)	Katinka Hosszú (HUN)	Zsuzsanna Jakabos (HUN)
2012 Debrecen	Katinka Hosszú (HUN)	Zsuzsanna Jakabos (HUN)	Barbora Závadová (CZE)
2014 Berlin	Katinka Hosszú (HUN)	Mireia Belmonte García (ESP)	Aimee Willmott (GBR)
2016 London	Katinka Hosszú (HUN)	Hannah Miley (GBR)	Zsuzsanna Jakabos (HUN)
2018 Glasgow	Fantine Lesaffre (FRA)	Ilaria Cusinato (ITA)	Hannah Miley (GBR)
2020 Budapest	Katinka Hosszú (HUN)	Viktória Mihályvári-Farkas (HUN) Aimee Willmott (GBR)	none awarded
2022 Rome	Viktória Mihályvári-Farkas (HUN)	Zsuzsanna Jakabos (HUN)	Freya Colbert (GBR)
2024 Belgrade	Anastasia Gorbenko (ISR)	Vivien Jackl (HUN)	Zsuzsanna Jakabos (HUN)
2026 Paris	Ellen Walshe (IRL)	Amalie Smith (GBR)	Justina Kozan (POL)

== Relays ==
=== 4 × 100 metre freestyle ===
Year	Gold	Silver	Bronze
1927 Bologna	Great Britain; Marion Laverty; Valerie Davies; Ellen King; Joyce Cooper	Netherlands; Truus Klapwijk; Willy den Turk; Marie Braun; Maria Vierdag	Germany; Charlotte Lehmann; Anni Rehborn; Marianne Schmidt; Reni Erkens
1931 Paris	Netherlands; Truus Baumeister; Maria Vierdag; Willy den Ouden; Marie Braun	Great Britain; Valerie Davies; Phyllis Harding; Jean McDowall; Joyce Cooper	Hungary; Margit Mallasz; Ilona Tóth; Margit Sipos; Magda Lenkei
1934 Magdeburg	Netherlands; Jopie Selbach; Ans Timmermans; Rie Mastenbroek; Willy den Ouden	Germany; Ruth Halbsguth; Ingrid Ohliger; Hilde Salbert; Gisela Arendt	Great Britain; Olive Bartle; Margery Hinton; Edna Hughes; Cecelia Wolstenholme
1938 London	Denmark; Eva Arndt Riise; Gunvor Kraft; Birte Ove-Petersen; Ragnhild Hveger	Netherlands; Alie Stijl; Trude Malcorps; Rie van Veen; Willy den Ouden	Great Britain; Zilpha Grant; Joyce Harrowby; Margery Hinton; Olive Wadham
1947 Monte Carlo	Denmark; Elvi Svendsen; Karen Harup; Greta Andersen; Fritze Nathansen	Netherlands; Margot Marsman; Irma Heijting-Schuhmacher; Marie-Louise Linssen-Vaessen; Hannie Termeulen	Great Britain; Catherine Gibson; Lillian Preece; Nancy Riach; Margaret Wellington
1950 Vienna	Netherlands; Ans Massaar; Hannie Termeulen; Marie-Louise Linssen-Vaessen; Irma Heijting-Schuhmacher	Denmark; Greta Olsen; Ulla Madsen; Mette Ove-Petersen; Greta Andersen	Sweden; Marianne Lundqvist; Gisela Tidholm; Ingegard Fredin; Elisabeth Ahlgren
1954 Turin	Hungary; Valéria Gyenge; Agata Sebö; Judit Temes; Katalin Szőke	Netherlands; Loes Zandvliet; Joke de Korte; Hetty Balkenende; Geertje Wielema	West Germany; Kati Jansen; Gisela von Netz; Birgit Klomp; Elisabeth Rechlin
1958 Budapest	Netherlands; Corrie Schimmel; Tineke Lagerberg; Greetje Kraan; Cocky Gastelaars	Great Britain; Judy Grinham; Elspeth Ferguson; Judith Samuel; Diana Wilkinson	Sweden; Birgitta Eriksson; Karin Larsson; Barbro Andersson; Kate Jobson
1962 Leipzig	Netherlands; Cocky Gastelaars; Adrie Lasterie; Erica Terpstra; Ineke Tigelaar	Great Britain; Linda Amos; Adrienne Brenner; Jennifer Thompson; Diana Wilkinson	Hungary; Maria Frank; Zsuzsa Kovács; Csilla Dobai-madarász; Katalin Takacs
1966 Utrecht	Soviet Union; Natalya Sipchenko; Antonina Rudenko; Natalya Ustinova; Tamara Sosnova	Sweden; Ingrid Gustavsson; Ulla Jafvert; Ann-Charlotte Lilja; Ann-Christine Hagberg	Netherlands; Toos Beumer; Mirjam van Hemert; Bep Weeteling; Lydia Schaap
1970 Barcelona	East Germany; Gabriele Wetzko; Iris Komar; Elke Sehmisch; Sabine Schulze	Hungary; Andrea Gyarmati; Judit Turóczy; Edit Kovács; Magdolna Patoh	Sweden; Elisabeth Berglund; Eva Andersson; Anita Zarnowiecki; Gunilla Jonsson
1974 Vienna	East Germany; Kornelia Ender; Angela Franke; Andrea Eife; Andrea Hübner	Netherlands; Anke Rijnders; Ada Pors; Veronica Stel; Enith Brigitha	France; Claude Mandonnaud; Sylvie Le Noach; Chantal Schertz; Guylaine Berger
1977 Jönköping	East Germany; Birgit Treiber; Birgit Wächtler; Petra Priemer; Barbara Krause	Netherlands; Ineke Ran; Anja van de Bogaerde; Annelies Maas; Enith Brigitha	Great Britain; Victoria Bullock; Mary Houston; Sharron Davies; Cheryl Brazendale
1981 Split	East Germany; Birgit Meineke; Caren Metschuck; Ines Diers; Susanne Link	West Germany; Marion Aizpors; Karin Seick; Ute Neubert; Susanne Schuster	Netherlands; Annemarie Verstappen; Monique Drost; Wilma van Velsen; Conny van Bentum
1983 Rome	East Germany; Kristin Otto; Susanne Link; Cornelia Sirch; Birgit Meineke	Netherlands; Annemarie Verstappen; Wilma van Velsen; Elles Voskes; Conny van Bentum	West Germany; Karin Seick; Susanne Schuster; Iris Zscherpe; Ina Beyermann
1985 Sofia	East Germany; Astrid Strauss; Karen König; Manuela Stellmach; Heike Friedrich	Germany; Iris Zscherpe; Susanne Schuster; Christiane Pielke; Karin Seick	Netherlands; Conny van Bentum; Ilse Oegama; Karin Brienesse; Annemarie Verstappen
1987 Strasbourg	East Germany; Manuela Stellmach; Heike Friedrich; Kristin Otto; Katrin Meissner	Netherlands; Marianne Muis; Diana van der Plaats; Mildred Muis; Karin Brienesse	West Germany; Stephanie Bofinger; Svenja Schlicht; Christiane Pielke; Karin Seick
1989 Bonn	East Germany; Katrin Meissner; Manuela Stellmach; Daniela Hunger; Heike Friedrich	Netherlands; Diana van der Plaats; Marieke Mastenbroek; Mildred Muis; Marianne Muis	West Germany; Katja Ziliox; Susanne Schuster; Marion Aizpors; Birgit Lohberg-Schulz
1991 Athens	Netherlands; Diana van der Plaats; Inge de Bruijn; Marieke Mastenbroek; Karin Brienesse	Germany; Daniela Hunger; Katrin Meissner; Dagmar Hase; Simone Osygus	Denmark; Mette Nielsen; Gitta Jensen; Berit Puggard; Mette Jacobsen
1993 Sheffield	Germany; Franziska van Almsick; Kerstin Kielgass; Manuela Stellmach; Daniela Hunger	Sweden; Ellen Svensson; Linda Olofsson; Louise Jöhncke; Malin Nilsson	Russia; Svetlana Leshukova; Natalya Meshcheryakova; Olga Kiritchenko; Nina Zhivanevskaya
1995 Vienna	Germany; Franziska van Almsick; Simone Osygus; Kerstin Kielgass; Daniela Hunger	Sweden; Louise Jöhncke; Louise Karlsson; Linda Olofsson; Ellenor Svensson	Great Britain; Sue Rolph; Claire Huddart; Alex Bennett; Karen Pickering
1997 Seville	Germany; Katrin Meissner; Simone Osygus; Antje Buschschulte; Sandra Völker	Sweden; Louise Jöhncke; Josefin Lillhage; Malin Svahnström; Therese Alshammar	Russia; Svetlana Leshukova; Natalya Meshcheryakova; Inna Yaitskaya; Nadezhda Chemezova
1999 Istanbul	Germany; Katrin Meissner; Antje Buschschulte; Franziska van Almsick; Sandra Völker	Sweden; Louise Jöhncke; Josefin Lillhage; Malin Svahnström; Therese Alshammar	Great Britain; Alison Sheppard; Claire Huddart; Karen Pickering; Sue Rolph
2000 Helsinki	Sweden; Louise Jöhncke; Johanna Sjöberg; Anna-Karin Kammerling; Therese Alshammar	Italy; Luisa Striani; Sara Parise; Cecilia Vianini; Cristina Chiuso	Belgium; Nina van Koeckhoven; Liesbet Dreesen; Sofie Goffin; Tine Bossuyt
2002 Berlin	Germany; Katrin Meissner; Petra Dallmann; Sandra Völker; Franziska van Almsick	Sweden; Josefin Lillhage; Johanna Sjöberg; Anna-Karin Kammerling; Therese Alshammar	Netherlands; Manon van Rooijen; Marleen Veldhuis; Chantal Groot; Wilma van Hofwegen
2004 Madrid	France; Solenne Figuès; Céline Couderc; Aurore Mongel; Malia Metella	Netherlands; Chantal Groot; Inge Dekker; Annabel Kosten; Marleen Veldhuis	Sweden; Johanna Sjöberg; Gabriella Fagundez; Cathrin Carlzon; Josefin Lillhage
2006 Budapest	Germany; Petra Dallmann; Daniela Götz; Britta Steffen; Annika Liebs	Netherlands; Inge Dekker; Ranomi Kromowidjojo; Chantal Groot; Marleen Veldhuis	France; Alena Popchanka; Aurore Mongel; Céline Couderc; Malia Metella
2008 Eindhoven	Netherlands; Inge Dekker; Ranomi Kromowidjojo; Femke Heemskerk; Marleen Veldhuis	Italy; Erika Ferraioli; Federica Pellegrini; Maria Laura Simonetto; Cristina Chiuso	Sweden; Claire Hedenskog; Josefin Lillhage; Ida Marko-Varga; Magdalena Kuras
2010 Budapest	Germany; Daniela Samulski; Silke Lippok; Lisa Vitting; Daniela Schreiber	Great Britain; Amy Smith; Francesca Halsall; Jessica Sylvester; Joanne Jackson	Sweden; Josefin Lillhage; Therese Alshammar; Sarah Sjöström; Gabriella Fagundez
2012 Debrecen	Germany; Britta Steffen; Silke Lippok; Lisa Vitting; Daniela Schreiber	Sweden; Ida Marko-Varga; Michelle Coleman; Sarah Sjöström; Gabriella Fagundez	Italy; Alice Mizzau; Federica Pellegrini; Erica Buratto; Erika Ferraioli
2014 Berlin	Sweden; Michelle Coleman; Magdalena Kuras; Louise Hansson; Sarah Sjöström	Netherlands; Inge Dekker; Maud van der Meer; Esmee Vermeulen; Femke Heemskerk	Italy; Alice Mizzau; Erika Ferraioli; Giada Galizi; Federica Pellegrini
2016 London	Netherlands; Maud van der Meer; Femke Heemskerk; Marrit Steenbergen; Ranomi Kromowidjojo	Italy; Silvia Di Pietro; Erika Ferraioli; Aglaia Pezzato; Federica Pellegrini	Sweden; Sarah Sjöström; Ida Marko-Varga; Ida Lindborg; Louise Hansson
2018 Glasgow	France; Marie Wattel; Charlotte Bonnet; Margaux Fabre; Béryl Gastaldello	Netherlands; Kim Busch; Femke Heemskerk; Kira Toussaint; Ranomi Kromowidjojo	Denmark; Pernille Blume; Signe Bro; Julie Kepp Jensen; Mie Nielsen
2020 Budapest	Great Britain; Lucy Hope; Anna Hopkin; Abbie Wood; Freya Anderson	Netherlands; Ranomi Kromowidjojo; Kira Toussaint; Marrit Steenbergen; Femke Heemskerk	France; Marie Wattel; Charlotte Bonnet; Anouchka Martin; Assia Touati
2022 Rome	Great Britain; Lucy Hope; Anna Hopkin; Medi Harris; Freya Anderson	Sweden; Sarah Sjöström; Louise Hansson; Sara Junevik; Sofia Åstedt	Netherlands; Kim Busch; Tessa Giele; Valerie van Roon; Marrit Steenbergen
2024 Belgrade	Hungary; Petra Senánszky; Minna Ábrahám; Panna Ugrai; Nikolett Pádár	Denmark; Elisabeth Sabroe Ebbesen; Signe Bro; Julie Kepp Jensen; Schastine Tabor	Poland; Kornelia Fiedkiewicz; Zuzanna Famulok; Wiktoria Gusc; Aleksandra Polanska
2026 Paris	Netherlands; Milou van Wijk; Imani de Jong; Yara van Kalmthout; Marrit Steenbergen; Tessa Giele; Femke Spiering	Italy; Emma Virginia Menicucci; Sara Curtis; Chiara Tarantino; Alessandra Mao; Sofia Morini	Neutral Athletes B Daria Klepikova; Alexandra Kuznetsova; Alina Gaifutdinova; Kira Manokhina; Dariia Surushkina; Kseniia Sorokina

=== 4 × 200 metre freestyle ===
Year	Gold	Silver	Bronze
1983 Rome	East Germany; Kristin Otto; Astrid Strauss; Cornelia Sirch; Birgit Meineke	West Germany; Jutta Kalweit; Birgit Kowalczyk; Petra Zindler; Ina Beyermann	Netherlands; Annemarie Verstappen; Jolande van der Meer; Reggie de Jong; Conny van Bentum
1985 Sofia	East Germany; Astrid Strauss; Karen König; Manuela Stellmach; Heike Friedrich	Netherlands; Jolande van der Meer; Ilse Oegama; Mildred Muis; Conny van Bentum	Sweden; Suzanne Nilsson; Maria Kardum; Agneta Eriksson; Eva Nyberg
1987 Strasbourg	East Germany; Manuela Stellmach; Heike Friedrich; Astrid Strauss; Anke Möhring	Romania; Luminița Dobrescu; Stela Pura; Anca Patrascoiu; Noemi Lung	West Germany; Svenja Schlicht; Heike Höller; Julia Lebek; Birgit Lohberg-Schulz
1989 Bonn	East Germany; Anke Möhring; Manuela Stellmach; Astrid Strauss; Heike Friedrich	Netherlands; Diana van der Plaats; Kirsten Silvester; Mildred Muis; Marianne Muis	Italy; Tanya Vannini; Orietta Patron; Silvia Persi; Manuela Melchiorri
1991 Athens	Denmark; Annette Poulsen; Gitta Jensen; Berit Puggard; Mette Jacobsen	Germany; Dagmar Hase; Manuela Stellmach; Simone Osygus; Heike Friedrich	Netherlands; Ellen Elzerman; Baukje Wiersma; Diana van der Plaats; Karin Brienesse
1993 Sheffield	Germany; Kerstin Kielgass; Simone Osygus; Franziska van Almsick; Dagmar Hase	Sweden; Louise Jöhncke; Magdalena Schultz; Therèse Lundin; Malin Nilsson	Great Britain; Sarah Hardcastle; Debbie Armitage; Claire Huddart; Karen Pickering
1995 Vienna	Germany; Dagmar Hase; Julia Jung; Kerstin Kielgass; Franziska van Almsick	Netherlands; Carla Geurts; Minouche Smit; Patricia Stokkers; Kirsten Vlieghuis	Great Britain; Vicky Horner; Claire Huddart; Katie Goddard; Alex Bennett
1997 Seville	Germany; Dagmar Hase; Janina Götz; Antje Buschschulte; Kerstin Kielgass	Sweden; Louise Jöhncke; Josefin Lillhage; Johanna Sjöberg; Malin Svahnström	Denmark; Britt Raaby; Berit Puggaard; Mette Jacobsen; Ditte Jensen
1999 Istanbul	Germany; Franziska van Almsick; Silvia Szalai; Hannah Stockbauer; Kerstin Kielgass	Sweden; Josefin Lillhage; Malin Svahnström; Johanna Sjöberg; Louise Jöhncke	Romania; Camelia Potec; Lorena Diaonescu; Simona Păduraru; Beatrice Câșlaru
2000 Helsinki	Romania; Camelia Potec; Simona Păduraru; Ioana Diaconescu; Beatrice Câșlaru	Italy; Luisa Striani; Cecilia Vianini; Sara Parise; Sara Goffi	France; Solenne Figuès; Laetitia Choux; Katarine Quelennec; Alicia Bozon
2002 Berlin	Germany; Petra Dallmann; Alessa Ries; Hannah Stockbauer; Franziska van Almsick	Spain; Laura Roca; Melissa Caballero; Erika Villaécija García; Tatiana Rouba	Sweden; Josefin Lillhage; Johanna Sjöberg; Lisa Wanberg; Ida Mattson
2004 Madrid	Spain; Tatiana Rouba; Melissa Caballero; Laura Roca; Erika Villaécija García	France; Céline Couderc; Katarin Quelennec; Elsa N'Guessan; Solenne Figuès	Romania; Camelia Potec; Larisa Lăcustă; Beatrice Câșlaru; Simona Păduraru
2006 Budapest	Germany; Petra Dallmann; Daniela Samulski; Britta Steffen; Annika Liebs	Poland; Otylia Jędrzejczak; Joanna Budzis; Agata Zwiejska; Paulina Barzycka	France; Alena Popchanka; Sophie Huber; Aurore Mongel; Laure Manaudou
2008 Eindhoven	France; Laure Manaudou; Coralie Balmy; Mylène Lazare; Alena Popchanka	Great Britain; Joanne Jackson; Melanie Marshall; Ellen Gandy; Caitlin McClatchey	Italy; Alice Carpanese; Federica Pellegrini; Alessia Filippi; Renata Spagnolo
2010 Budapest	Hungary; Ágnes Mutina; Eszter Dara; Katinka Hosszú; Evelyn Verrasztó	France; Coralie Balmy; Ophélie-Cyrielle Étienne; Margaux Farrell; Camille Muffat	Great Britain; Rebecca Adlington; Jazmin Carlin; Hannah Miley; Joanne Jackson
2012 Debrecen	Italy; Alice Mizzau; Alice Nesti; Diletta Carli; Federica Pellegrini	Hungary; Zsuzsanna Jakabos; Evelyn Verrasztó; Ágnes Mutina; Katinka Hosszú	Slovenia; Sara Isakovič; Anja Klinar; Ursa Bezan; Mojca Sagmeister
2014 Berlin	Italy; Alice Mizzau; Stefania Pirozzi; Chiara Masini Luccetti; Federica Pellegrini	Sweden; Michelle Coleman; Louise Hansson; Sarah Sjöström; Stina Gardell	Hungary; Zsuzsanna Jakabos; Evelyn Verrasztó; Boglárka Kapás; Katinka Hosszú
2016 London	Hungary; Zsuzsanna Jakabos; Evelyn Verrasztó; Boglárka Kapás; Katinka Hosszú	Spain; Melani Costa; Patricia Castro; Fatima Gallardo; Mireia Belmonte	Netherlands; Andrea Kneppers; Esmee Vermeulen; Robin Neumann; Femke Heemskerk
2018 Glasgow	Great Britain; Ellie Faulkner; Kathryn Greenslade; Holly Hibbott; Freya Anderson	Russia; Valeriya Salamatina; Anna Egorova; Arina Openysheva; Anastasia Guzhenkova	Germany; Reva Foos; Isabel Marie Gose; Sarah Köhler; Annika Bruhn
2020 Budapest	Great Britain; Lucy Hope; Tamryn van Selm; Holly Hibbott; Freya Anderson	Hungary; Zsuzsanna Jakabos; Fanni Fábián; Laura Veres; Boglárka Kapás	Italy; Stefania Pirozzi; Sara Gailli; Simona Quadarella; Federica Pellegrini
2022 Rome	Netherlands; Imani de Jong; Silke Holkenborg; Janna van Kooten; Marrit Steenbergen	Great Britain; Freya Colbert; Lucy Hope; Medi Harris; Freya Anderson	Hungary; Nikolett Pádár; Katinka Hosszú; Ajna Késely; Lilla Minna Ábrahám
2024 Belgrade	Israel; Anastasia Gorbenko; Daria Golovaty; Ayla Spitz; Lea Polonsky	Hungary; Minna Ábrahám; Ajna Késely; Dóra Molnár; Nikolett Pádár	Turkey; Gizem Güvenç; Ela Naz Özdemir; Ecem Dönmez; Zehra Durup Bilgin
2026 Paris	Great Britain; Freya Colbert; Abbie Wood; Leah Schlosshan; Freya Anderson; Theodora Taylor; Amalie Smith	Hungary; Nikolett Pádár; Lilla Minna Ábrahám; Ajna Késely; Panna Ugrai	Neutral Athletes B Kseniia Misharina; Sofia Diakova; Dariia Surushkina; Daria Klepikova; Milana Stepanova

=== 4 × 100 metre medley ===
Year	Gold	Silver	Bronze
1958 Budapest	Netherlands; Lenie de Nijs; Ada den Haan; Atie Voorbij; Cocky Gastelaars	Soviet Union; Larisa Viktorova; Eve Uusmees; Galina Kamaeva; Ulvi Voog	Great Britain; Judy Grinham; Anita Lonsbrough; Christine Gosden; Diana Wilkinson
1962 Leipzig	East Germany; Ingrid Schmidt; Barbara Göbel; Ute Noack; Heidi Pechstein	Netherlands; Ria van Velsen; Klenie Bimolt; Ada Kok; Ineke Tigelaar	Great Britain; Linda Ludgrove; Anita Lonsbrough; Mary-Anne Cotterill; Diana Wilkinson
1966 Utrecht	Netherlands; Cobie Sikkens; Gretta Kok; Ada Kok; Toos Beumer	Soviet Union; Natalya Mikhaylova; Galina Prozumenshchikova; Tatyana Devyatova; Antonina Rudenko	Great Britain; Linda Ludgrove; Diana Harris; Mary-Anne Cotterill; Pauline Sillett
1970 Barcelona	East Germany; Barbara Hofmeister; Brigitte Schuchardt; Helga Lindner; Gabriele Wetzko	Soviet Union; Tinatin Lekveishvili; Galina Prozumenshchikova; Valentina Tutayeva; Tatyana Zolotnitskaya	West Germany; Angelika Kraus; Uta Frommater; Heike Nagel; Heidemarie Reineck
1974 Vienna	East Germany; Ulrike Richter; Renate Vogel; Rosemarie Kother; Kornelia Ender	West Germany; Angelika Griesser; Christel Justen; Beate Jasch; Jutta Weber	Sweden; Gunilla Lundberg; Jeanette Pettersson; Gunilla Andersson; Diana Olsson
1977 Jönköping	East Germany; Ulrike Richter; Carola Nitschke; Andrea Pollack; Barbara Krause	Soviet Union; Kaire Indrikson; Yuliya Bogdanova; Olga Klevakina; Larisa Tsaryova	West Germany; Heike John; Dagmar Rehak; Karin Seick; Jutta Meeuw
1981 Split	East Germany; Ina Kleber; Ute Geweniger; Ines Geissler; Caren Metschuck	Soviet Union; Larisa Gorchakova; Larisa Belokon; Natalya Pokas; Natalya Strunnikova	West Germany; Ute Neubert; Andrea Schonborn; Karin Seick; Marion Aizpors
1983 Rome	East Germany; Ina Kleber; Ute Geweniger; Ines Geissler; Birgit Meineke	Netherlands; Jolanda de Rover; Petra van Staveren; Annemarie Verstappen; Conny van Bentum	West Germany; Svenja Schlicht; Ute Hasse; Ina Beyermann; Karin Seick
1985 Sofia	East Germany; Birte Weigang; Sylvia Gerasch; Kornelia Gressler; Heike Friedrich	Soviet Union; Natalya Shibaeva; Svetlana Kuzmina; Tatyana Kurnikova; Yelena Dendeberova	Bulgaria; Bistra Gospodinova; Tanya Bogomilova; Radovesta Pironkova; Vania Argirova
1987 Strasbourg	East Germany; Kristin Otto; Silke Hörner; Birte Weigang; Manuela Stellmach	Italy; Lorenza Vigarani; Manuela Dalla Valle; Ilaria Tocchini; Silvia Persi	West Germany; Svenja Schlicht; Britta Dahm; Susanne Schuster; Christiane Pielke
1989 Bonn	East Germany; Kristin Otto; Susanne Börnike; Jacqueline Jacob; Katrin Meissner	Italy; Lorenza Vigarani; Manuela Dalla Valle; Manuela Carosi; Silvia Persi	Netherlands; Ellen Elzerman; Kira Bulten; Judith Anema; Marianne Muis
1991 Athens	Soviet Union; Natalya Krupskaya; Yelena Rudkovskaya; Elena Kononenko; Yevgeniya Yermakova	Germany; Dagmar Hase; Sylvia Gerasch; Katrin Meissner; Simone Osygus	Netherlands; Ellen Elzerman; Kira Bulten; Inge de Bruijn; Karin Brienesse
1993 Sheffield	Germany; Sandra Völker; Sylvia Gerasch; Bettina Ustrowski; Franziska van Almsick	Russia; Nina Zhivanevskaya; Olga Prokhorova; Svetlana Pozdeyeva; Natalya Meshcheryakova	Great Britain; Kathy Osher; Jaime King; Nicola Goodwin; Karen Pickering
1995 Vienna	Germany; Cathleen Rund; Jana Dörries; Julia Voitowitch; Franziska van Almsick	Hungary; Krisztina Egerszegi; Ágnes Kovács; Edit Klocker; Gyöngyver Lakos	Spain; María Tato; María Olay; María Peláez; Claudia Franco
1997 Seville	Germany; Antje Buschschulte; Sylvia Gerasch; Katrin Meissner; Sandra Völker	Russia; Olga Kochetkova; Olga Landik; Svetlana Pozdeyeva; Natalya Meshcheryakova	Great Britain; Sarah Price; Jaime King; Caroline Foot; Karen Pickering
1999 Istanbul	Sweden; Therese Alshammar; Maria Östling; Johanna Sjöberg; Malin Svahnström	Germany; Sandra Völker; Silvia Pulfrich; Franziska van Almsick; Katrin Meissner	Great Britain; Katy Sexton; Zoë Baker; Sue Rolph; Karen Pickering
2000 Helsinki	Sweden; Therese Alshammar; Emma Igelström; Johanna Sjöberg; Louise Jöhncke	Belgium; Sofie Wolfs; Brigitte Becue; Fabienne Dufour; Nina van Koeckhoven	Romania; Raluca Udroiu; Beatrice Câșlaru; Diana Mocanu; Camelia Potec
2002 Berlin	Germany; Antje Buschschulte; Simone Weiler; Franziska van Almsick; Sandra Völker	Sweden; Therese Alshammar; Emma Igelström; Anna-Karin Kammerling; Johanna Sjöberg	Ukraine; Irina Amshennikova; Svitlana Bondarenko; Yana Klochkova; Olga Mukomol
2004 Madrid	France; Laure Manaudou; Laurie Thomassin; Aurore Mongel; Malia Metella	Ukraine; Iryna Amshennikova; Svitlana Bondarenko; Yana Klochkova; Olga Mukomol	Netherlands; Stefanie Luiken; Madelon Baans; Chantal Groot; Marleen Veldhuis
2006 Budapest	Great Britain; Melanie Marshall; Kirsty Balfour; Terri Dunning; Francesca Halsall	Germany; Antje Buschschulte; Sarah Poewe; Annika Mehlhorn; Britta Steffen	France; Laure Manaudou; Anne-Sophie Le Paranthoën; Alena Popchanka; Céline Couderc
2008 Eindhoven	Great Britain; Elizabeth Simmonds; Kate Haywood; Jemma Lowe; Francesca Halsall	Russia; Anastasia Zuyeva; Yuliya Yefimova; Natalya Sutyagina; Daria Belyakina	Netherlands; Hinkelien Schreuder; Jolijn van Valkengoed; Inge Dekker; Marleen Veldhuis
2010 Budapest	Great Britain; Gemma Spofforth; Kate Haywood; Francesca Halsall; Amy Smith	Sweden; Henriette Stenkvist; Joline Höstman; Therese Alshammar; Sarah Sjöström	Germany; Jenny Mensing; Caroline Ruhnau; Daniela Samulski; Silke Lippok
2012 Debrecen	Germany; Jenny Mensing; Sarah Poewe; Alexandra Wenk; Britta Steffen	Italy; Arianna Barbieri; Ilaria Bianchi; Chiara Boggiatto; Alice Mizzau	Sweden; Therese Svendsen; Joline Höstman; Martina Granström; Nathalie Lindborg
2014 Berlin	Denmark; Mie Nielsen; Rikke Møller Pedersen; Jeanette Ottesen; Pernille Blume	Sweden; Ida Lindborg; Jennie Johansson; Sarah Sjöström; Michelle Coleman	Great Britain; Georgia Davies; Sophie Taylor; Jemma Lowe; Francesca Halsall
2016 London	Great Britain; Kathleen Dawson; Chloe Tutton; Siobhan-Marie O'Connor; Francesca Halsall	Italy; Carlotta Zofkova; Martina Carraro; Ilaria Bianchi; Erika Ferraioli	Finland; Mimosa Jallow; Jenna Laukkanen; Emilia Pikkarainen; Hanna-Maria Seppälä
2018 Glasgow	Russia; Anastasia Fesikova; Yuliya Yefimova; Svetlana Chimrova; Maria Kameneva	Denmark; Mie Nielsen; Rikke Møller Pedersen; Emilie Beckmann; Pernille Blume	Great Britain; Georgia Davies; Siobhan-Marie O'Connor; Alys Thomas; Freya Anderson
2020 Budapest	Great Britain; Kathleen Dawson; Molly Renshaw; Laura Stephens; Anna Hopkin	Russia; Maria Kameneva; Yuliya Yefimova; Svetlana Chimrova; Arina Surkova	Italy; Margherita Panziera; Arianna Castiglioni; Elena Di Liddo; Federica Pellegrini
2022 Rome	Sweden; Hanna Rosvall; Sophie Hansson; Louise Hansson; Sarah Sjöström	France; Pauline Mahieu; Charlotte Bonnet; Marie Wattel; Béryl Gastaldello	Netherlands; Kira Toussaint; Tes Schouten; Maaike de Waard; Marrit Steenbergen
2024 Belgrade	Poland; Adela Piskorska; Dominika Sztandera; Paulina Peda; Kornelia Fiedkiewicz	Hungary; Lora Komoróczy; Eszter Békési; Panna Ugrai; Nikolett Pádár	Denmark; Schastine Tabor; Clara Rybak-Andersen; Helena Rosendahl Bach; Julie Kepp Jensen
2026 Paris	Great Britain; Lauren Cox; Angharad Evans; Keanna Macinnes; Freya Colbert; Katie Shanahan; Emily Richards; Theodora Taylor	Italy; Sara Curtis; Benedetta Pilato; Anita Gastaldi; Emma Virginia Menicucci; Lisa Angiolini	Neutral Athletes B Alina Gaifutdinova; Evgeniia Chikunova; Daria Klepikova; Kira Manokhina; Yuliya Yefimova; Arina Surkova; Alexandra Kuznetsova

=== 4 × 100 metre mixed freestyle ===
Year	Gold	Silver	Bronze
2014 Berlin	Italy; Luca Dotto; Luca Leonardi; Erika Ferraioli; Giada Galizi	Russia; Andrey Grechin; Vladimir Morozov; Veronika Andrusenko; Margarita Nesterova	France; Clément Mignon; Grégory Mallet; Anna Santamans; Coralie Balmy
2016 London	Netherlands; Sebastiaan Verschuren; Ben Schwietert; Maud van der Meer; Ranomi Kromowidjojo	Italy; Filippo Magnini; Luca Dotto; Erika Ferraioli; Federica Pellegrini	France; Clément Mignon; Jérémy Stravius; Charlotte Bonnet; Anna Santamans
2018 Glasgow	France; Jérémy Stravius; Mehdy Metella; Marie Wattel; Charlotte Bonnet	Netherlands; Nyls Korstanje; Stan Pijnenburg; Femke Heemskerk; Ranomi Kromowidjojo	Russia; Kliment Kolesnikov; Vladislav Grinev; Maria Kameneva; Arina Openysheva
2020 Budapest	Great Britain; Duncan Scott; Tom Dean; Anna Hopkin; Freya Anderson	Netherlands; Stan Pijnenburg; Jesse Puts; Ranomi Kromowidjojo; Femke Heemskerk	Italy; Alessandro Miressi; Thomas Ceccon; Federica Pellegrini; Silvia Di Pietro
2022 Rome	France; Maxime Grousset; Charles Rihoux; Charlotte Bonnet; Marie Wattel	Great Britain; Thomas Dean; Matthew Richards; Anna Hopkin; Freya Anderson	Sweden; Björn Seeliger; Robin Hanson; Sarah Sjöström; Louise Hansson
2024 Belgrade	Hungary; Hubert Kós; Szebasztián Szabó; Panna Ugrai; Nikolett Pádár	Poland; Mateusz Chowaniec; Kamil Sieradzki; Zuzanna Famulok; Kornelia Fiedkiewicz	Germany; Martin Wrede; Peter Varjasi; Nicole Maier; Nina Jazy
2026 Paris	Neutral Athletes B Egor Kornev; Ivan Giryov; Daria Klepikova; Kira Manokhina; Roman Zhidkov; Vasilii Kukushkin; Dariia Surushkina; Kseniia Sorokina	Netherlands; Sean Niewold; Merlin Belmon; Milou van Wijk; Marrit Steenbergen; Brandon van den Berg; Yara van Kalmthout; Imani de Jong	Italy; Carlos D'Ambrosio; Thomas Ceccon; Sara Curtis; Emma Virginia Menicucci; Manuel Frigo; Alessandra Mao

=== 4 × 200 metre mixed freestyle ===
Year	Gold	Silver	Bronze
2018 Glasgow	Germany; Jacob Heidtmann; Henning Mühlleitner; Reva Foos; Annika Bruhn	Russia; Mikhail Vekovishchev; Mikhail Dovgalyuk; Valeriya Salamatina; Viktoriya Andreyeva	Great Britain; Stephen Milne; Craig McLean; Kathryn Greenslade; Freya Anderson
2020 Budapest	Great Britain; Tom Dean; James Guy; Abbie Wood; Freya Anderson	Italy; Stefano Ballo; Stefano Di Cola; Federica Pellegrini; Margherita Panziera	Russia; Aleksandr Shchegolev; Aleksandr Krasnykh; Anna Egorova; Anastasiya Kirpichnikova
2022 Rome	Great Britain; Tom Dean; Matt Richards; Freya Colbert; Freya Anderson	France; Hadrien Salvan; Wissam-Amazigh Yebba; Charlotte Bonnet; Lucile Tessariol	Italy; Stefano Di Cola; Matteo Ciampi; Alice Mizzau; Noemi Cesarano
2024 Belgrade	Hungary; Richárd Márton; Balázs Holló; Minna Ábrahám; Nikolett Pádár	Poland; Bartosz Piszczorowicz; Kamil Sieradzki; Wiktoria Gusc; Zuzanna Famulok	Germany; Danny Schmidt; Philipp Peschke; Nicole Maier; Leonie Kullmann
2026 Paris	Great Britain; Jack McMillan; Matt Richards; Freya Colbert; Freya Anderson; Leah Schlosshan; Tyler Melbourne-Smith	Germany; Lukas Märtens; Jarno Baschnitt; Linda Roth; Maya Tobehn; Timo Sorgius; Nicole Maier	Neutral Athletes B Grigorii Vekovishchev; Ivan Giryov; Daria Klepikova; Kseniia Misharina; Roman Akimov; Andrei Cherepkov; Sofia Diakova

=== 4 × 100 metre mixed medley ===
Year	Gold	Silver	Bronze
2014 Berlin	Great Britain; Chris Walker-Hebborn; Adam Peaty; Jemma Lowe; Fran Halsall	Netherlands; Bastiaan Lijesen; Bram Dekker; Inge Dekker; Femke Heemskerk	Russia; Vladimir Morozov; Vitalina Simonova; Viacheslav Prudnikov; Veronika Andrusenko
2016 London	Great Britain; Chris Walker-Hebborn; Adam Peaty; Siobhan-Marie O'Connor; Fran Halsall	Italy; Simone Sabbioni; Martina Carraro; Piero Codia; Federica Pellegrini	Hungary; Gábor Balog; Gábor Financsek; Evelyn Verrasztó; Zsuzsanna Jakabos
2018 Glasgow	Great Britain; Georgia Davies; Adam Peaty; James Guy; Freya Anderson	Russia; Kliment Kolesnikov; Yuliya Yefimova; Svetlana Chimrova; Vladimir Morozov	Italy; Margherita Panziera; Fabio Scozzoli; Elena Di Liddo; Alessandro Miressi
2020 Budapest	Great Britain; Kathleen Dawson; Adam Peaty; James Guy; Anna Hopkin	Netherlands; Kira Toussaint; Arno Kamminga; Nyls Korstanje; Femke Heemskerk	Italy; Margherita Panziera; Nicolò Martinenghi; Elena Di Liddo; Alessandro Miressi
2022 Rome	Netherlands; Kira Toussaint; Arno Kamminga; Nyls Korstanje; Marrit Steenbergen	Italy; Thomas Ceccon; Nicolò Martinenghi; Elena Di Liddo; Silvia Di Pietro	Great Britain; Medi Harris; James Wilby; Jacob Peters; Anna Hopkin
2024 Belgrade	Israel; Anastasia Gorbenko; Ron Polonsky; Gal Cohen Groumi; Andrea Murez	Germany; Maya Werner; Melvin Imoudu; Luca Armbruster; Nina Jazy	Hungary; Hubert Kós; Eszter Békési; Richárd Márton; Petra Senánszky
2026 Paris	France; Mary-Ambre Moluh; Carl Aitkaci; Maxime Grousset; Marie Wattel; Amaury Albar; Albane Cachot	Netherlands; Maaike de Waard; Caspar Corbeau; Sean Niewold; Marrit Steenbergen; Koen de Groet; Tessa Giele	Neutral Athletes B Kliment Kolesnikov; Kirill Prigoda; Daria Klepikova; Alexandra Kuznetsova; Pavel Samusenko; Ivan Kozhakin; Arina Surkova; Alina Gaifutdinova

== See also ==
- List of European Aquatics Championships medalists in swimming (men)
- List of European Aquatics Championships medalists in open water swimming
