= Olaf von Schilling =

German former swimmer (born 1943)

Personal information
- Born: 16 September 1943 Stralsund, Germany
- Died: 18 May 2018 (aged 74) Dinslaken, Germany

Sport
- Sport: Swimming
Medal record
Representing West Germany
European Championships
Gold medal – first place	1970 Barcelona	4x200m freestyle relay

Olaf von Schilling (16 September 1943 – 18 May 2018) was a German former swimmer who competed in the 1968 Summer Olympics and in the 1972 Summer Olympics.

The 1.87 m tall athlete, who competed for the Wasserfreunde Wuppertal and was trained by Heinz Hoffmann, achieved his greatest successes in the shorter crawl distances. In 1965 he set a world record with the German men's 4 x 100 and 4 x 200 meter freestyle relay. At the 1968 Olympic Games in Mexico City he achieved sixth place in the finals of both freestyle relay teams. In the individual event he was eliminated in the semifinals over 100 meters with 55.9 s and in the preliminary round over 200 meters freestyle with 2:01.7 min. At the 1970 European Aquatics Championships in Barcelona he replaced Hans-Günther Vosseler in the final of the long freestyle relay and won the gold medal in a team with Werner Lampe, his then clubmate Folkert Meeuw and Hans Fassnacht. At the 1972 Olympics in Munich, the outstanding stylist was the oldest participant in the German swimming team in the individual 200 meter preliminary round and managed a time of 2:00.27 min.

He received the Silver Laurel Leaf for winning the gold medal at the 1970 European Championships in Barcelona.
