= Krasko =

Krasko (Russian or Ukrainian: Краско or Красько) is a gender-neutral Ukrainian surname that may refer to

- Andrey Krasko (1957–2006), Russian theatre and cinema actor
- Olga Krasko (born 1981), Russian actress
- Ivan I. Krasko (1930–2025), Russian film and theater actor, father of Andrey
- Ivan Krasko (1876–1958), Slovak poet and translator
- Julia Krasko (born 1971), Russian violinist
- Viktor Krasko (born 1953), Soviet swimmer
- Vyacheslav Krasko (born 1974), Russian traveler, manager and financier
