= Pechman =

Pechman or Pechmann is a surname of German origin. Notable people with that name include:

- Joseph A. Pechman (1918–1989), American economist
- Hans von Pechmann (1850–1902), German chemist
- Marsha J. Pechman (born 1951), American judge
- Matthias Pechmann, East German swimmer
