= Michel Rousseau (swimmer) =

French swimmer (born 1949)

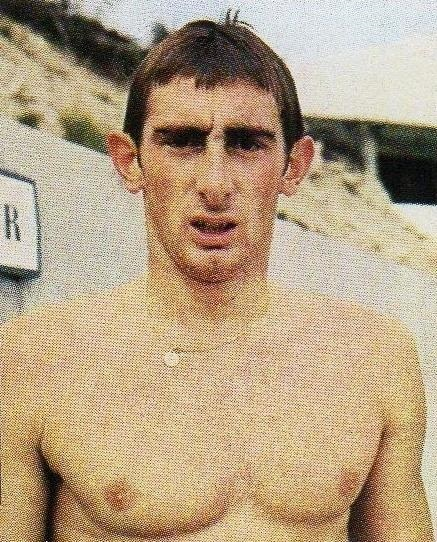
- Michel Rousseau c. 1974

Personal information
- Full name: Michel Rousseau
- Nationality: French
- Born: 8 June 1949 (age 77)
- Height: 181 cm (5 ft 11 in)
- Weight: 77 kg (170 lb)

Sport
- Sport: Swimming
- Strokes: Freestyle
- Club: ASPTT de Paris; CN Antibes Juan
Medal record
Representing France
World Aquatics Championships
Silver medal – second place	1973 Belgrade	100 m freestyle
European Aquatics Championships
Gold medal – first place	1970 Barcelona	100 m freestyle
Silver medal – second place	1970 Barcelona	4×100 m medley

Michel Rousseau (born 8 June 1949) is a retired French freestyle swimmer who won the 100 m event at the 1970 European Championships and placed second at the 1973 World Championships. He competed at the 1968, 1972 and 1976 Summer Olympics in eight events in total with the best result of fifth place in the 4 × 200 m freestyle relay in 1972. His daughter Magali Rousseau became an Olympic butterfly swimmer.
