= Udo Poser =

East German swimmer

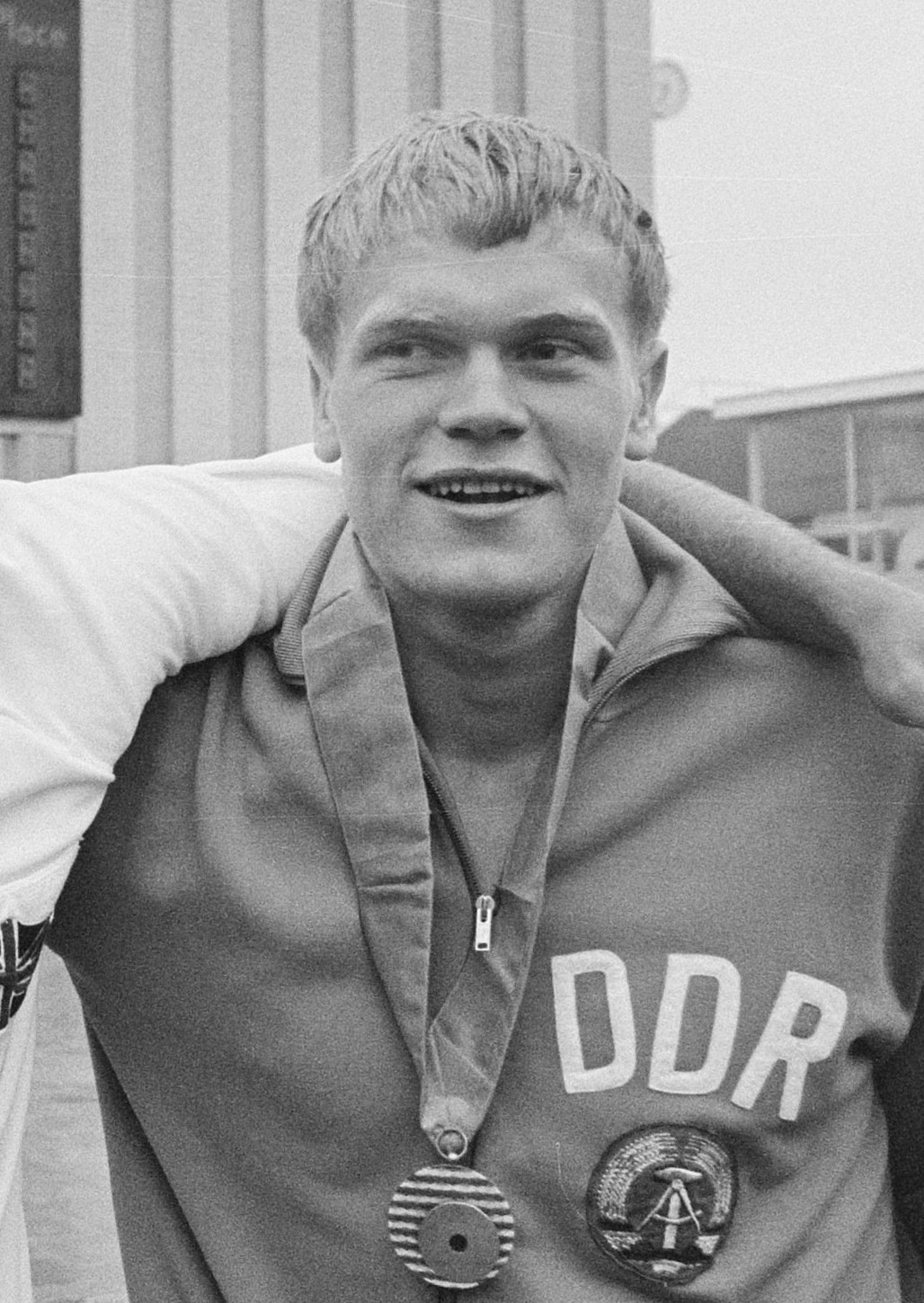
- Udo Poser in 1966

Personal information
- Born: 21 August 1947 (age 78) Hildburghausen, Germany
- Height: 1.86 m (6 ft 1 in)
- Weight: 87 kg (192 lb)

Sport
- Sport: Swimming
- Club: ASK Vorwärts Rostock
Medal record
Representing East Germany
Olympic Games
Bronze medal – third place	1972 Munich	4×100 m freestyle
European Championships
Gold medal – first place	1966 Utrecht	4×100 m freestyle
Silver medal – second place	1966 Utrecht	4×200 m freestyle
Bronze medal – third place	1966 Utrecht	100 m freestyle
Silver medal – second place	1970 Barcelona	100 m butterfly
Gold medal – first place	1970 Barcelona	200 m butterfly
Gold medal – first place	1970 Barcelona	4×100 m medley
Bronze medal – third place	1970 Barcelona	4×100 m freestyle
Bronze medal – third place	1970 Barcelona	4×200 m freestyle

Udo Poser (born 21 August 1947) is a German former swimmer. He competed at the 1968 and 1972 Summer Olympics and won a bronze medal in the 4 × 100 m freestyle relay in 1972 by swimming for the East Germany team in the preliminary round. He finished in fifth and sixth place in the 4 × 100 m freestyle relay in 1968 and in the 4 × 200 m freestyle relay in 1972, respectively, whereas individually he failed to reach the finals in the 200 m and 400 m freestyle.

He competed at two European championships in 1966 and 1970 and earned eight medals, including three gold medals, and set one world record in the 4 × 100 m freestyle relay in 1970. Between 1969 and 1971 he won six national titles in the 100 m and 200 m butterfly events.
