= Ahmed Anarbayev =

Soviet swimmer (1948–2023)

Personal information
- Born: 30 May 1948 Kara-Balta, Kirghiz SSR, USSR
- Died: 6 August 2023 (aged 75)
- Height: 1.78 m (5 ft 10 in)
- Weight: 65 kg (143 lb)

Sport
- Sport: Swimming
- Club: Alga Frunze
Medal record
Men's swimming
Representing Soviet Union
European Championships
Silver medal – second place	1970 Barcelona	4×200 m freestyle

Akhmed Anarbayev (Russian: Ахмед Анарбаев; 30 May 1948 – 6 August 2023) was a Kyrgyzstani Soviet swimmer who won a silver medal at the 1970 European Aquatics Championships. He also competed in the 400 m freestyle at the 1968 Summer Olympics but did not reach the finals.

After retiring from senior swimming Anarbayev continued to compete internationally in the masters category. He was also an experienced open water swimmer who crossed Issyk Kul and took part in a crossborder swimming event in the Bering Strait. From 1992 to 1997 he was the President of the Kyrgyz Republic Swimming Federation.

Anarbayev lived in Bishkek, and worked in the hotel business. He died on 6 August 2023, at the age of 75.
