= Heidi Becker-Ramlow =

German diver (1954–1987)

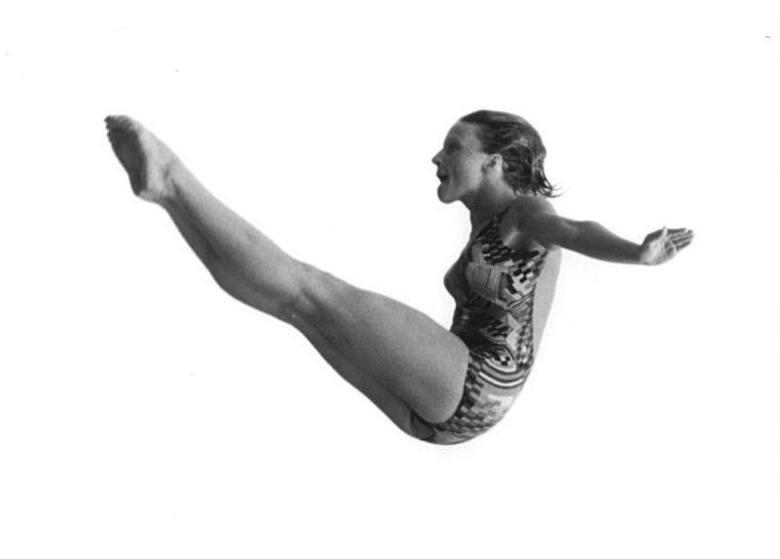
- Heidi Becker-Ramlow in 1975

Personal information
- Nationality: German
- Born: 21 November 1954 Rostock, East Germany
- Died: 13 February 1987 (aged 32) Rostock, East Germany

Sport
- Sport: Diving
Medal record
Women's diving
Representing East Germany
European Championships
Gold medal – first place	1970 Barcelona	3 m springboard

Heidi Becker-Ramlow (21 November 1954 – 13 February 1987) was a German diver. She won the 3m springboard event at the 1970 European Aquatics Championships, and competed at the 1972 Summer Olympics and the 1976 Summer Olympics. Becker-Ramlow committed suicide in 1987 after her husband left her for another woman.
