= Lothar Matthes =

German diver (1947–2025)

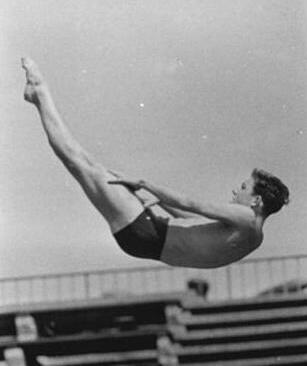
- Matthes in 1966

Personal information
- Born: 23 July 1947 Celle, Germany
- Died: 31 July 2025 (aged 78) Dresden, Germany

Sport
- Sport: Diving
Medal record
Representing East Germany
European Championships
Gold medal – first place	1970 Barcelona	10m platform

Lothar Matthes (23 July 1947 – 31 July 2025) was a German diver who competed in the 1968 Summer Olympics and in the 1972 Summer Olympics.
