= Lutz Unger =

East German swimmer

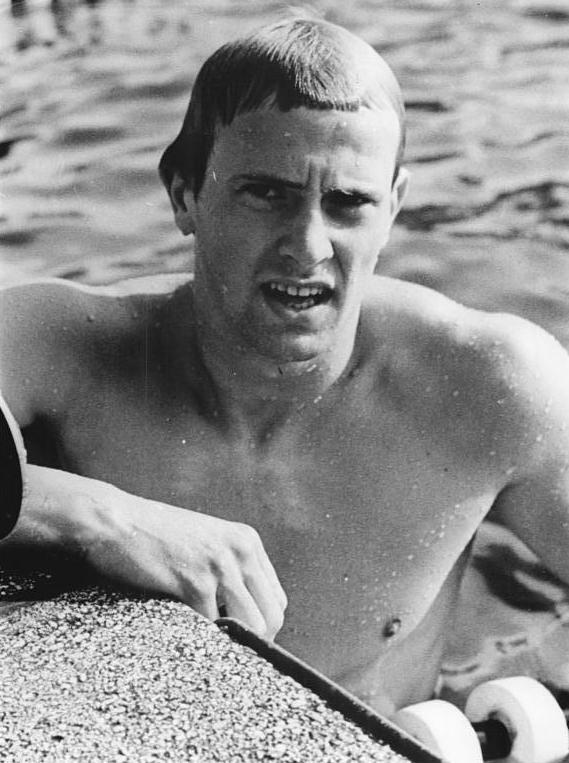
- Unger in 1970

Personal information
- Born: 19 June 1951 (age 75) Wernigerode, East Germany
- Height: 1.86 m (6 ft 1 in)
- Weight: 80 kg (176 lb)

Sport
- Sport: Swimming
- Club: SC Dynamo Berlin
Medal record
Representing East Germany
Olympic Games
Silver medal – second place	1972 Munich	4×100 m medley
Bronze medal – third place	1972 Munich	4×100 m freestyle
European Championships
Gold medal – first place	1970 Barcelona	4×100 m medley
Bronze medal – third place	1970 Barcelona	4×100 m freestyle
Bronze medal – third place	1970 Barcelona	4×200 m freestyle

Lutz Unger (born 19 June 1951) is a retired East German swimmer. He competed at the 1972 Summer Olympics in the 4 × 100 m medley and 4 × 100 m and 4 × 200 m freestyle relays and finished in second, third and sixth place, respectively. He won three medals in these relays at the 1970 European Aquatics Championships.
