= Matthias Pechmann =

German swimmer

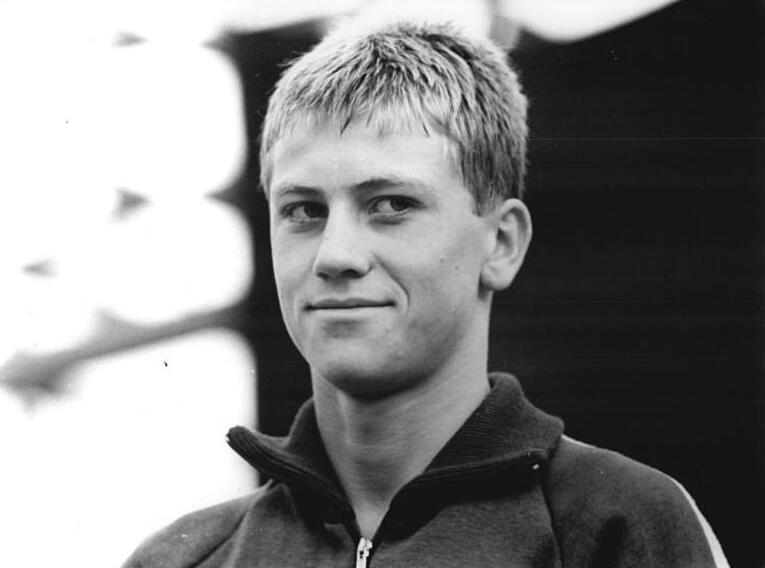
- Pechmann in 1968

Sport
- Sport: Swimming
- Club: SC DHfK Leipzig
Medal record
Representing East Germany
European Championships
Silver medal – second place	1970 Barcelona	200 m medley
Bronze medal – third place	1970 Barcelona	400 m medley

Matthias Pechmann is a retired German swimmer who won two medals in the individual medley events at the 1970 European Aquatics Championships. Between 1968 and 1970 he won three national titles in the 400 m medley.

After retirement he worked as a swimming coach at SC DHfK Leipzig, the club he was competing for.
