= Susanne Börnike =

East German swimmer

Personal information
- Born: August 13, 1968 (age 57) Brandenburg an der Havel, East Germany

Sport
- Sport: Swimming
- Strokes: Breaststroke
Medal record
Representing East Germany
European Championships
Gold medal – first place	1989 Bonn	100m breaststroke
Gold medal – first place	1989 Bonn	200m breaststroke
Gold medal – first place	1989 Bonn	4x100m medley relay

Susanne Börnike (born 13 August 1968) is a German former swimmer who competed at the 1988 Summer Olympics in 200 metre breaststroke.
