= Edeltraud Koch =

German swimmer (born 1954)

Personal information
- Born: 13 September 1954 (age 71) Hamm, Germany
- Height: 1.79 m (5 ft 10 in)
- Weight: 70 kg (150 lb)

Sport
- Sport: Swimming
- Club: Wasserfreunde Wuppertal
Medal record
Women's swimming
Representing West Germany
Summer Olympics
Bronze medal – third place	1972 Munich	4×100 m medley
European Championships
Bronze medal – third place	1970 Barcelona	100 m butterfly

Edeltraud Koch (also Edeltraut; born 13 September 1954) is a retired German swimmer. She won a bronze medal at the 1970 European Aquatics Championships in the 100 m butterfly, and a bronze medal at the 1972 Summer Olympics in the 4 × 100 m medley relay. In the relay, West Germany used different swimmers in the preliminaries and in the final; Koch swam in the preliminaries.
