= Katarin Quelennec =

French swimmer

Personal information
- Born: 28 May 1980 (age 46)

Sport
- Sport: Swimming
Medal record
Representing France
European Championships
Silver medal – second place	2004 Madrid	4x200m freestyle relay
Bronze medal – third place	2000 Helsinki	4x200m freestyle relay

Katarin Quelennec (born 28 May 1980) is a French former swimmer who competed in the 2000 Summer Olympics and in the 2004 Summer Olympics.
