= Valentina Tutayeva =

Russian swimmer (born 1953)

Personal information
- Born: 1953 (age 72–73) Moscow, Russia

Sport
- Sport: Swimming
- Club: Burevestnik Moscow
Medal record
Representing Soviet Union
European Championships
Silver medal – second place	1970 Barcelona	4×100 m medley

Valentina Tutayeva (Russian: Валентина Тутаева; born 1953) is a Russian swimmer who won a silver medal in the 4×100 m medley relay at the 1970 European Aquatics Championships; individually, she finished fourth in the 200 m butterfly event. Between 1969 and 1972 she won one national title and set four national records in butterfly events. After retirement from senior swimming she competed in the masters category and set two national records in 1997 and 1998. She changed her last name to Karpus (Russian: Карпус) after marriage.
