= Folkert Meeuw =

German swimmer

Personal information
- Born: 11 November 1946 (age 79) Wiesbaden, Allied-occupied Germany
- Height: 1.79 m (5 ft 10 in)
- Weight: 75 kg (165 lb)

Sport
- Sport: Swimming
- Club: Wasserfreunde Wuppertal
Medal record
Men's swimming
Representing West Germany
Summer Olympics
Silver medal – second place	1972 Munich	4×200 m freestyle
World Championships
Bronze medal – third place	1973 Belgrade	4×200 m freestyle
European Championships
Gold medal – first place	1970 Barcelona	4×200 m freestyle
Gold medal – first place	1974 Vienna	4×200 m freestyle
Gold medal – first place	1974 Vienna	4×100 m medley
Silver medal – second place	1970 Barcelona	4×100 m freestyle
Silver medal – second place	1970 Barcelona	200 m freestyle
Bronze medal – third place	1974 Vienna	100 m freestyle
Summer Universiade
Silver medal – second place	1973 Moscow	200 m butterfly

Folkert Meeuw (born 11 November 1946) is a German former swimmer who competed at the 1968 and 1972 Summer Olympics, and won a silver medal in the 4 × 200 m freestyle relay in 1972. Next year he won a bronze in the same event at the 1973 World Aquatics Championships. In 1970 and 1974 he won six European medals in various events, including three gold medals.

His wife, Jutta Weber, and son, Helge Meeuw, both competed for Germany in swimming and won medals at Summer Olympics and World and European championships.
