= Iris Komar =

German swimmer

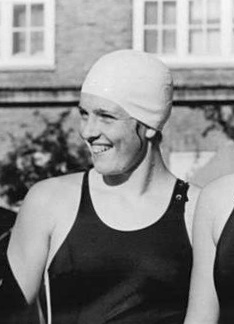
- Iris Komar in 1971

Sport
- Sport: Swimming
- Club: SC DHfK Leipzig
Medal record
Swimming
Representing East Germany
European Championships
Gold medal – first place	1970 Barcelona	4×100 m freestyle

Iris Komar is a retired German swimmer who won a gold medal in the 4×100 m freestyle relay at the 1970 European Aquatics Championships, setting a new world record. Between 1967 and 1971 she won four national titles in the same event.

== Sports psychology ==
She graduated from the Leipzig University in psychology and sports training. In 1993 she defended her PhD at the same university titled “Bewegungs- und Trainingswissenschaft” (Movement and Training Science) and later worked in sports psychology at Forschungsinstitut and clinical psychology at the University Hospital in Leipzig.

She speaks German, English, Dutch and Russian.

== Publications ==
Komar published a series of books on swimming training of children, including the following

- Iris Komar (1993). Modifizierung des Grundlagentrainings im Sportschwimmen für die Weiterentwicklung des Kindertrainings in Vereinen am Beispiel von Schwimmgruppen in Belgien.
- Iris Komar (1995). Schwimmtraining für Kinder I.: Grundlagentraining – Trainingsprogramme. 1 Jahr. Meyer und Meyer. ISBN 978-3-89124-259-9.
- Iris Komar (1995). Schwimmtraining für Kinder III.: Grundlagentraining. Trainingsprogramme. 3. Jahr. Meyer und Meyer. ISBN 978-3-89124-305-3.
- Iris Komar (1996). Kraulschwimmen. Meyer & Meyer.
- Iris Komar (1996). Brustschwimmen. Meyer & Meyer.
- Iris Komar (1996). Rückenschwimmen. Meyer & Meyer.
- Iris Komar (1996). Schwimmtechnik im Kindertraining. (1). Rückenschwimmen. Meyer & Meyer. ISBN 978-3-89124-273-5.
- Iris Komar (1997). Schwimmtechnik im Kindertraining. (4). Schmetterlingsschwimmen. Meyer & Meyer. ISBN 978-3-89124-351-0.
- Iris Komar (1997). Schmetterlingsschwimmen. Meyer & Meyer.
- Iris Komar. Schwimmtraining für Kinder: Grundlagentraining – Trainingsprogramme. Meyer und Meyer.
