= Sabine Schulze =

German swimmer

Personal information
- Born: Leipzig, East Germany
- Height: 180 cm (5 ft 11 in)
- Weight: 66 kg (146 lb)

Sport
- Sport: Swimming
- Club: TSC Berlin
Medal record
Swimming
Representing East Germany
European Championships
Gold medal – first place	1970 Barcelona	4×100 m freestyle

Sabine Schulze is a retired German swimmer who won a gold medal in the 4×100 m freestyle relay at the 1970 European Aquatics Championships, setting a new world record.
