= Birgit Lohberg-Schulz =

German swimmer (born 1965)

Personal information
- Born: 3 December 1965 (age 60) Moers, West Germany
- Height: 1.76 m (5 ft 9 in)
- Weight: 63 kg (139 lb)

Sport
- Sport: Swimming
- Club: Schwimm Gemeinschaft Hamburg
Medal record
Women's swimming
Representing West Germany
European Championships
Silver medal – second place	1987 Strasbourg	4×200 m freestyle
Bronze medal – third place	1989 Bonn	4×100 m freestyle

Birgit Lohberg-Schulz (also Schulz-Lohberg, Lohberg or Schulz; born 3 December 1965) is a retired German freestyle swimmer who won two bronze relay medals at the 1987 and 1989 European Aquatics Championships. She also competed at the 1988 Summer Olympics in the 200 m freestyle and 200 m and 400 m medley events but did not reach the finals.
