= Cobie Buter =

Dutch swimmer (born 1946)

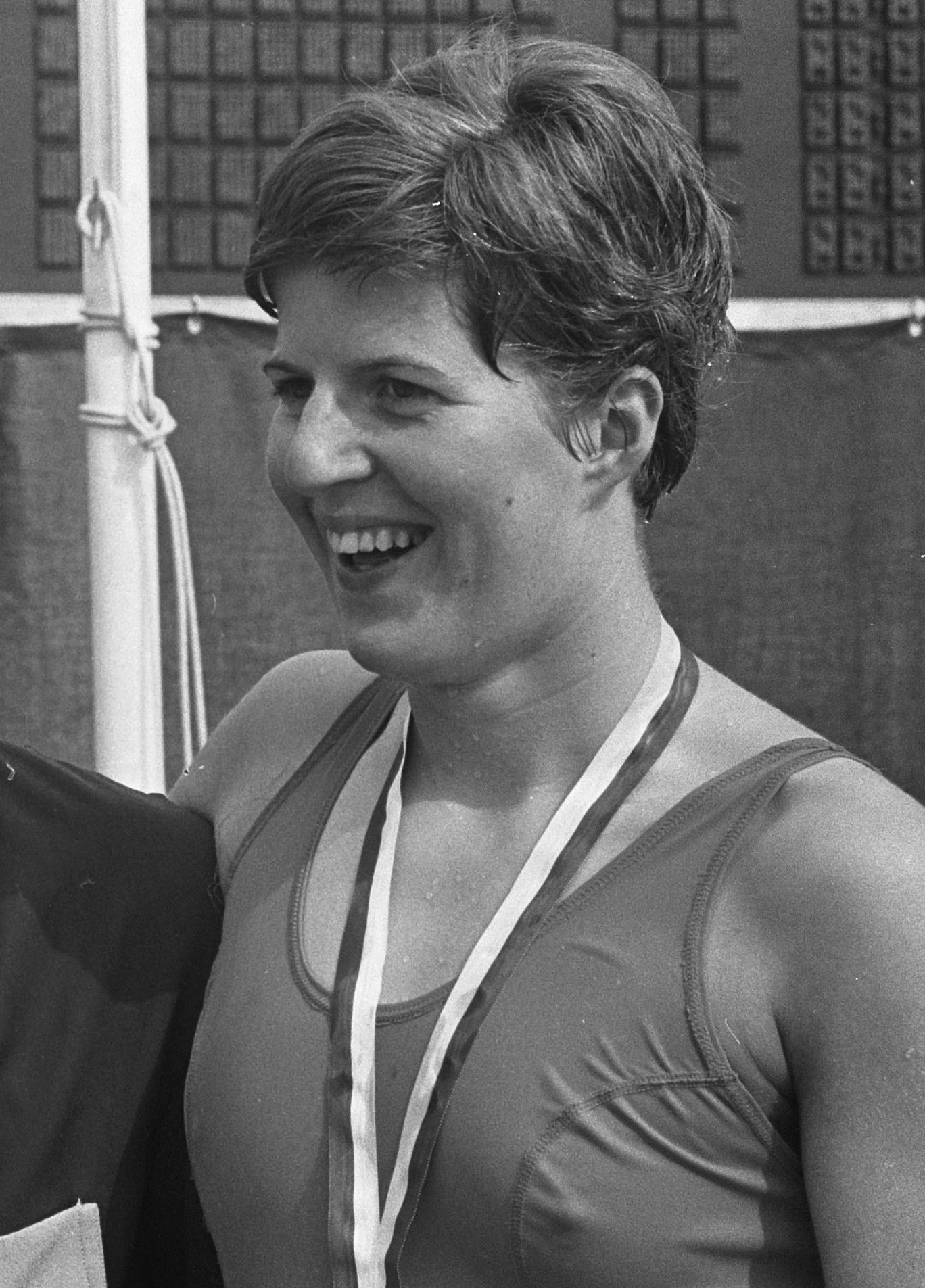
- Cobie Buter in 1967

Personal information
- Born: 17 May 1946 (age 80) Steenwijk, Overijssel, Netherlands
- Height: 1.78 m (5 ft 10 in)
- Weight: 63 kg (139 lb)

Sport
- Club: Zwemlust, Utrecht
Medal record
Women's swimming
Representing the Netherlands
European Championships
Bronze medal – third place	1970 Barcelona	100 m backstroke

Jacobje Jantje "Cobie" Buter (also Coby; born 17 May 1946) is a retired Dutch swimmer who won the bronze medal in 100 m backstroke at the 1970 European Aquatics Championships. She also competed at the 1968 Summer Olympics and finished seventh in the 4 × 100 m medley relay. She helped the Dutch team to set a new European record in the same event in 1968. Between 1965 and 1970 she won four national titles and set four records in the 100 m backstroke.
