= Tinatin Lekveishvili =

Georgian backstroke swimmer (born 1954)

Personal information
- Born: January 2, 1954 (age 72) Tbilisi, Soviet Union

Sport
- Sport: Swimming
- Strokes: Backstroke
Medal record
Representing the Soviet Union
European Championships
Gold medal – first place	1970 Barcelona	100 m backstroke
Silver medal – second place	1970 Barcelona	4×100 medley relay
Bronze medal – third place	1970 Barcelona	200 m backstroke

Tinatin "Tina" Lekveishvili (Georgian: თინათინ ლეკვეიშვილი, born 2 January 1954) is a retired Georgian backstroke swimmer who won three medals at the 1970 European Aquatics Championships setting the European record in the 100 m backstroke event. She also participated in the 1968 and 1972 Summer Olympics and finished fourth with the Soviet 4×100 medley relay team in both games. Between 1968 and 1972 she dominated Soviet championships and set three national records in the 100 m and 200 m backstroke events. She graduated from the Tbilisi Medical Institute.
