= Karin Tülling =

German swimmer

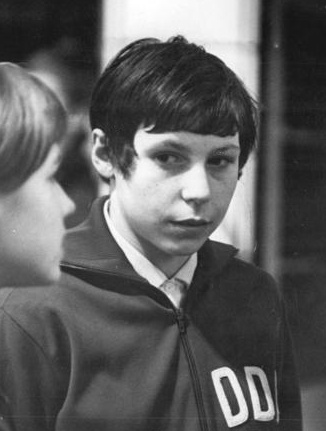
- Karin Tülling in 1970

Personal information
- Born: 19 April 1955 (age 71) Putbus, Germany
- Height: 1.73 m (5 ft 8 in)
- Weight: 61 kg (134 lb)

Sport
- Sport: Swimming
- Club: SC Empor Rostock
Medal record
Women's swimming
Representing East Germany
European Championships
Bronze medal – third place	1970 Barcelona	400 m freestyle

Karin Tülling (born 19 April 1955) is a retired German freestyle swimmer who won a bronze medal at the 1970 European Aquatics Championships. She competed at the 1972 Summer Olympics in the 200 m, 400 m and 800 m freestyle and finished eighth in the 200 m event.
