= Evelyn Stolze =

German former swimmer (born 1954)

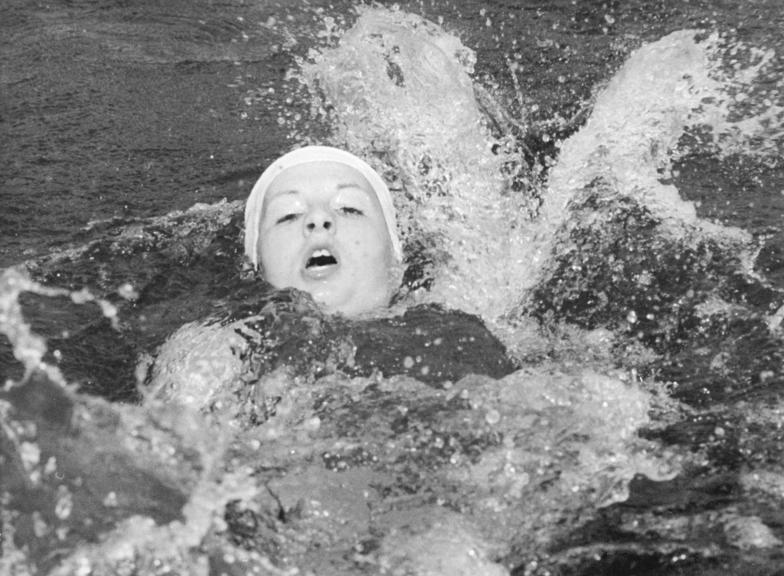
- Evelyn Stoltze in 1970

Personal information
- Born: 8 January 1954 (age 72) Erfurt, East Germany
- Height: 1.64 m (5 ft 5 in)
- Weight: 58 kg (128 lb)

Sport
- Sport: Swimming
- Club: SC Dynamo Berlin
Medal record
Representing East Germany
European Championships
Gold medal – first place	1970 Barcelona	400 m medley
Silver medal – second place	1970 Barcelona	200 m medley
Bronze medal – third place	1970 Barcelona	200 m butterfly

Evelyn Stolze (born 8 January 1954) is a former East German swimmer. She competed at the 1972 Summer Olympics in the 200 m and 400 m individual medley events and finished in sixth and fifth place, respectively. She won three medals in medley and butterfly events at the 1970 European Aquatics Championships.

She married Peter Rund, an East German water polo player and swimmer. Their daughter Cathleen (born 1977) also became an Olympic swimmer.
