= Barbara Hofmeister =

German swimmer

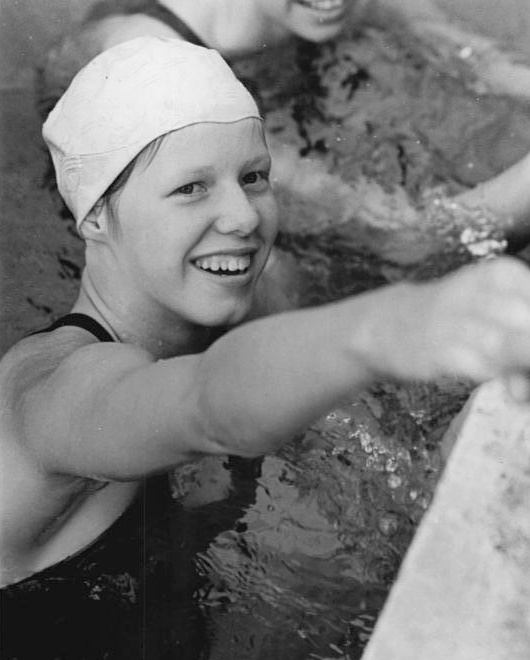
- Hofmeister in 1968

Personal information
- Born: 1954 (age 71–72)

Sport
- Sport: Swimming
- Club: Einheit Greiz (1967–68), SC DHfK Leipzig (1969–1971)
Medal record
Swimming
Representing East Germany
European Championships
Gold medal – first place	1970 Barcelona	4×100 m medley
Silver medal – second place	1970 Barcelona	200 m backstroke

Barbara Hofmeister (born 1954) is a German backstroke swimmer who won one gold and one silver medal at the 1970 European Aquatics Championships. Between 1968 and 1971, she won eight national titles in the 100 m (1968–1971) and 200 m backstroke (1969–1971) and 4×100 m medley relay (1969).

She changed her last name to Stubbe upon marriage. She works as a swimming coach at BSC Robben in Wilmersdorf, Berlin, and competes in the masters category.
