= Linda de Boer =

Dutch swimmer (born 1954)

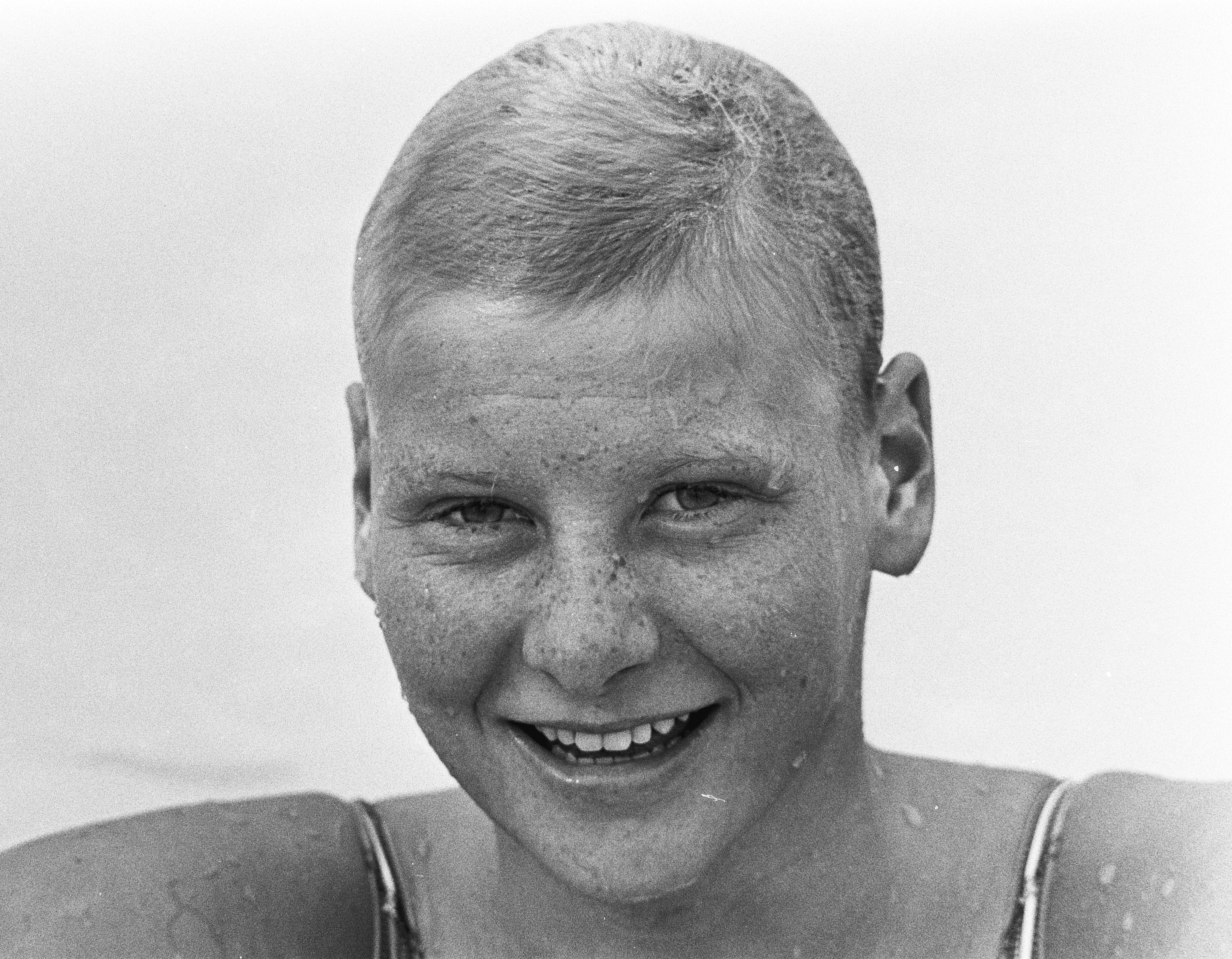
- Linda de Boer in 1971

Sport
- Club: Naarden
Medal record
Women's swimming
Representing the Netherlands
European Championships
Silver medal – second place	1970 Barcelona	800 m freestyle

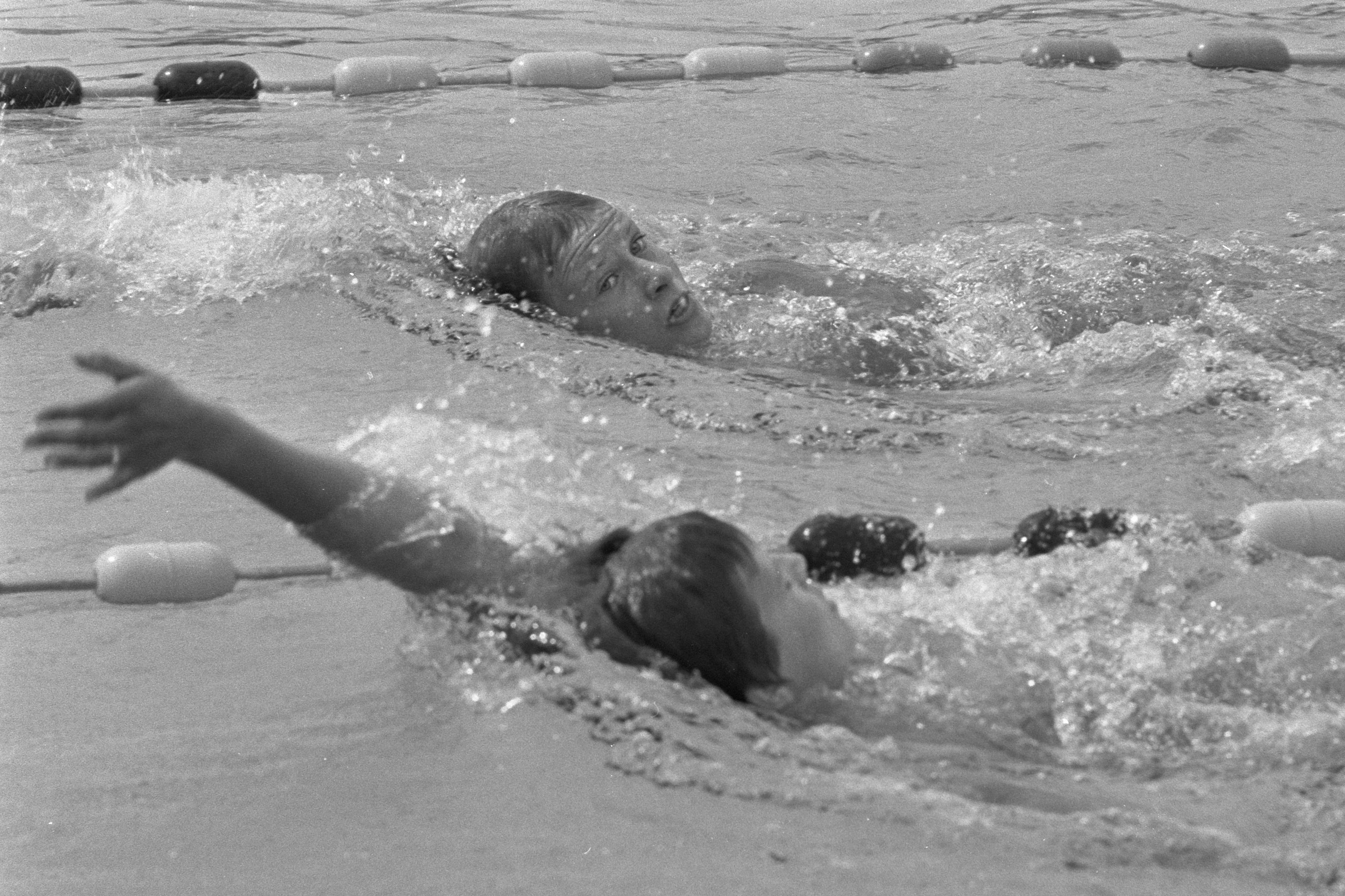
Linda de Boer (in background) at the 1970 national championships, 400 m medley.

Linda de Boer (born 1954) is a retired Dutch swimmer who won the silver medal in the 800 m freestyle at the 1970 European Aquatics Championships. In June 1971 she set a European record of 18 minutes and 3 seconds in the 1500 m freestyle. Between 1969 and 1971 she won two national titles and set 14 national records in the 400 m, 800 m and 1500 m freestyle events.

Her daughter, Daniëlle uit den Boogaard (b. 1983), and possibly son, David uit den Boogaard (b. 1983), also became competitive swimmers and national champions.
