= Hans Fassnacht =

German swimmer

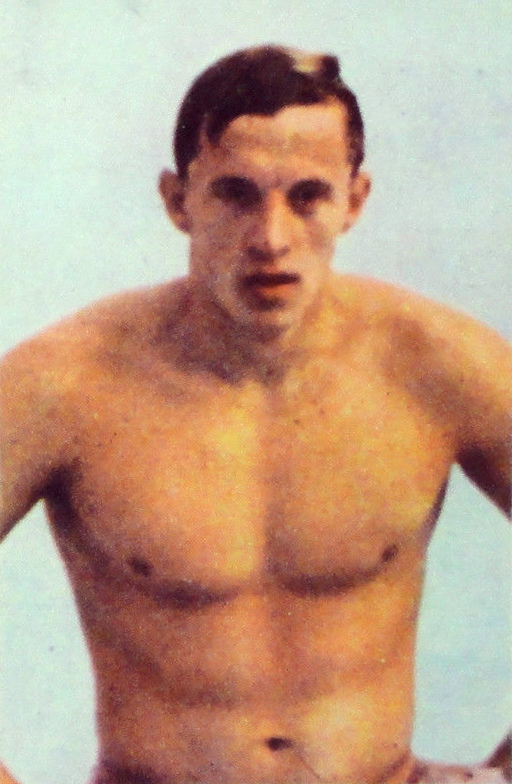

Personal information
- Born: 28 November 1950 (age 75) Baden-Württemberg, West Germany
- Height: 1.75 m (5 ft 9 in)
- Weight: 70 kg (154 lb)

Sport
- Sport: Swimming
- Club: VWM, Mannheim
- Coached by: Don Gambril (Long Beach State)
Medal record
Representing West Germany
Olympic Games
Silver medal – second place	1972 Munich	4×200 m freestyle
European Championships
Gold medal – first place	1970 Barcelona	200 m freestyle
Gold medal – first place	1970 Barcelona	1500 m freestyle
Gold medal – first place	1970 Barcelona	4×200 m freestyle
Silver medal – second place	1970 Barcelona	400 m freestyle
Silver medal – second place	1970 Barcelona	400 m medley
Silver medal – second place	1970 Barcelona	4×100 m freestyle

Hans-Joachim Fassnacht (German pronunciation: [hans ˈfasˌnaxt]; born 28 November 1950) is a retired German swimmer. He competed at the 1968 and 1972 Summer Olympics in various freestyle and butterfly events and won a silver medal in the 4 × 200 m freestyle in 1972. In 1972, he also won a 1500 m freestyle semifinal, setting an Olympic record, but withdrew from the final.

During his career, Fassnacht set 41 German, 21 European and two world records, as well as five world best times. In 1969, while attending Long Beach State University under Coach Don Gambril, he broke the world record in the 400 m freestyle, and the following year broke another one in the 200 m butterfly. He was selected as West German Sportspersonality of the Year three consecutive times: in 1969, 1970 and 1971, beating Franz Beckenbauer. In 1992, he was inducted into the International Swimming Hall of Fame.

== See also ==
- List of members of the International Swimming Hall of Fame
- World record progression 400 metres freestyle
