= Karin Neugebauer =

East German swimmer

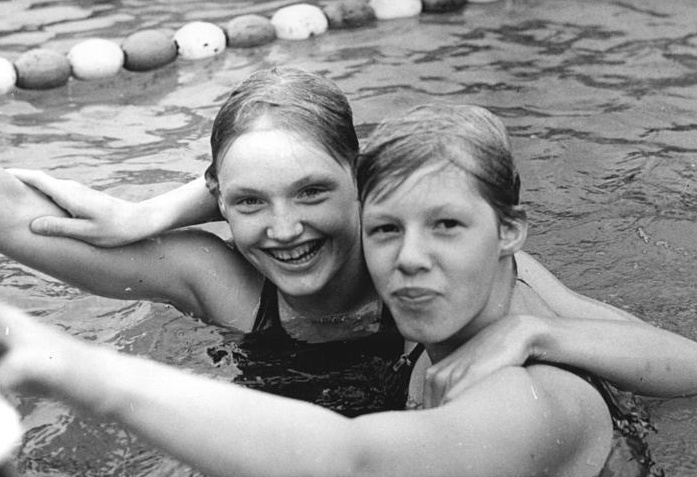
- Karin Neugebauer (left) in 1969

Personal information
- Born: December 5, 1955 (age 70) Leipzig, East Germany

Sport
- Sport: Swimming
Medal record
Representing East Germany
European Championships
Gold medal – first place	1970 Barcelona	800 m freestyle

Karin Neugebauer (later Fröbel, born 5 December 1955) is a retired German freestyle swimmer. At the age of 13 she won the gold medal in the 800 m freestyle event at the 1969 Junior European Aquatics Championships in Vienna, and repeated this achievement in the next year at the 1970 European Aquatics Championships. However, shortly thereafter she retired from competitive swimming.
