= 1970 European Aquatics Championships =

Water sport competitions

12th European Aquatics Championships
- Host city: Barcelona
- Country: Spain
- Events: 34
- Opening: 5 September 1970
- Closing: 13 September 1970

The 1970 European Aquatics Championships were held in Barcelona, Spain from 5 to 13 September 1970. Titles were contested in swimming, diving and water polo (men). The swimming program was significantly expanded. Both men and women competed in the 200 m freestyle, 100 m breaststroke and 200 individual medley for the first time. Furthermore, in the men's swimming program the 100 m butterfly was introduced and the 100 m backstroke was re-introduced after having been absent for the last two championships. In the women's swimming program, the 800 m freestyle, 200 m backstroke and 200 m butterfly were introduced.

== Medal table ==
* Host nation (Spain)

Rank	Nation	Gold	Silver	Bronze	Total
1	East Germany	16	9	9	34
2	Soviet Union	6	4	8	18
3	West Germany	4	6	4	14
4	Sweden	3	2	2	7
5	Hungary	2	3	0	5
6	Italy	1	2	2	5
7	France	1	2	0	3
8	Czechoslovakia	1	0	0	1
9	Yugoslavia	0	3	1	4
10	Spain*	0	2	2	4
11	Netherlands	0	1	2	3
12	Great Britain	0	0	4	4
Totals (12 entries)		34	34	34	102

== Medal summary ==
=== Diving ===
Men's events

Event	Gold		Silver		Bronze	
3 m springboard	Franco Cagnotto (ITA)	555.21	Klaus Dibiasi (ITA)	534.72	Vladimir Vasin (URS)	529.80
10 m platform	Lothar Matthes (GDR)	454.74	Klaus Dibiasi (ITA)	444.18	Franco Cagnotto (ITA)	435.36

Women's events

Event	Gold		Silver		Bronze	
3 m springboard	Heidi Becker (GDR)	420.63	Marina Janicke (GDR)	407.22	Tamara Safonova (URS)	405.60
10 m platform	Milena Duchková (TCH)	336.33	Marina Janicke (GDR)	329.85	Sylvia Fiedler (GDR)	322.26

=== Swimming ===
==== Men's events ====
Event	Gold		Silver		Bronze	
100 m freestyle	Michel Rousseau (FRA)	52.9	Roland Matthes (GDR)	53.5	Georgiy Kulikov (URS)	53.7
200 m freestyle	Hans Fassnacht (FRG)	1:55.2	Gunnar Larsson (SWE)	1:55.7	Georgiy Kulikov (URS)	1:56.6
400 m freestyle	Gunnar Larsson (SWE)	4:02.6	Hans Fassnacht (FRG)	4:03.0	Santiago Esteva (ESP)	4:08.3
1500 m freestyle	Hans Fassnacht (FRG)	16:19.9	Werner Lampe (FRG)	16:25.6	Santiago Esteva (ESP)	16:35.7
100 m backstroke	Roland Matthes (GDR)	58.9	Santiago Esteva (ESP)	59.9	Bob Schoutsen (NED)	1:00.4
200 m backstroke	Roland Matthes (GDR)	2:08.8	Santiago Esteva (ESP)	2:09.7	Volker Werner (GDR)	2:11.5
100 m breaststroke	Nikolay Pankin (URS)	1:06.8	Roger-Philippe Menu (FRA)	1:07.8	Rolf Klees (FRG)	1:08.1
200 m breaststroke	Klaus Katzur (GDR)	2:26.0	Nikolay Pankin (URS)	2:26.1	Walter Kusch (FRG)	2:28.2
100 m butterfly	Hans Lampe (FRG)	57.5	Udo Poser (GDR)	57.9	Vladimir Nemshilov (URS)	58.0
200 m butterfly	Udo Poser (GDR)	2:08.0	Folkert Meeuw (FRG)	2:08.2	Hartmut Flöckner (GDR)	2:09.6
200 m individual medley	Gunnar Larsson (SWE)	2:09.3	Matthias Pechmann (GDR)	2:13.6	Hans Ljungberg (SWE)	2:14.3
400 m individual medley	Gunnar Larsson (SWE)	4:36.2	Hans Fassnacht (FRG)	4:36.9	Matthias Pechmann (GDR)	4:40.6
4 × 100 m freestyle relay	Soviet Union; Vladimir Bure; Viktor Mazanov; Georgiy Kulikov; Leonid Ilyichev	3:32.3	West Germany; Gerhard Schiller; Rainer Jacob; Folkert Meeuw; Hans Fassnacht	3:34.1	East Germany; Roland Matthes; Lutz Unger; Frank Seebald; Udo Poser	3:34.6
4 × 200 m freestyle relay	West Germany; Werner Lampe; Olaf von Schilling; Folkert Meeuw; Hans Fassnacht	7:49.5	Soviet Union; Georgiy Kulikov; Ahmed Anarbayev; Aleksandr Samsonov; Vladimir Bure	7:52.8	East Germany; Lutz Unger; Wilfried Hartung; Roland Matthes; Udo Poser	7:54.5
4 × 100 m medley relay	East Germany; Roland Matthes; Klaus Katzur; Udo Poser; Lutz Unger	3:54.4	France; Jean-Paul Berjeau; Roger-Philippe Menu; Alain Mosconi; Michel Rousseau	3:57.6	Soviet Union; Viktor Krasko; Nikolay Pankin; Vladimir Nemshilov; Leonid Ilyichev	3:58.0

==== Women's events ====
Event	Gold		Silver		Bronze	
100 m freestyle	Gabriele Wetzko (GDR)	59.6	Mirjana Šegrt (YUG)	1:00.8	Alexandra Jackson (GBR)	1:00.8
200 m freestyle	Gabriele Wetzko (GDR)	2:08.2	Mirjana Šegrt (YUG)	2:11.9	Yvonne Nieber (GDR)	2:12.8
400 m freestyle	Elke Sehmisch (GDR)	4:32.9	Gunilla Jonsson (SWE)	4:36.8	Karin Tülling (GDR)	4:38.0
800 m freestyle	Karin Neugebauer (GDR)	9:29.1	Linda de Boer (NED)	9:35.7	Novella Calligaris (ITA)	9:38.8
100 m backstroke	Tinatin Lekveishvili (URS)	1:07.8	Andrea Gyarmati (HUN)	1:07.9	Cobie Buter (NED)	1:08.5
200 m backstroke	Andrea Gyarmati (HUN)	2:25.5	Barbara Hofmeister (GDR)	2:26.6	Tinatin Lekveishvili (URS)	2:27.1
100 m breaststroke	Galina Stepanova-Prozumenshchikova (URS)	1:15.6	Uta Frommater (FRG)	1:16.9	Alla Grebennikova (URS)	1:16.9
200 m breaststroke	Galina Stepanova-Prozumenshchikova (URS)	2:40.7	Alla Grebennikova (URS)	2:43.5	Dorothy Harrison (GBR)	2:45.6
100 m butterfly	Andrea Gyarmati (HUN)	1:05.0	Helga Lindner (GDR)	1:05.6	Edeltraut Koch (FRG)	1:05.8
200 m butterfly	Helga Lindner (GDR)	2:20.2	Mirjana Šegrt (YUG)	2:24.5	Evelyn Stolze (GDR)	2:25.6
200 m individual medley	Martina Grunert (GDR)	2:26.6	Evelyn Stolze (GDR)	2:29.3	Shelagh Ratcliffe (GBR)	2:29.6
400 m individual medley	Evelyn Stolze (GDR)	5:07.0	Brigitte Schuchardt (GDR)	5:18.3	Shelagh Ratcliffe (GBR)	5:19.6
4 × 100 m freestyle relay	East Germany; Gabriele Wetzko; Iris Komar; Elke Sehmisch; Sabine Schulze	4:00.8	Hungary; Andrea Gyarmati; Judit Turóczy; Edit Kovács; Magdolna Patoh	4:02.7	Sweden; Elisabeth Berglund; Eva Andersson; Anita Zarnowiecki; Gunilla Jonsson	4:07.4
4 × 100 m medley relay	East Germany; Barbara Hofmeister; Brigitte Schuchardt; Helga Lindner; Gabriele Wetzko	4:30.1	Soviet Union; Tinatin Lekveishvili; Galina Stepanova-Prozumenshchikova; Valentina Tutayeva; Tatyana Zolotnitskaya	4:31.3	West Germany; Angelika Kraus; Uta Frommater; Heike Nagel; Heidemarie Reineck	4:33.4

=== Water polo ===
Event	Gold	Silver	Bronze
Men's competition	Soviet Union	Hungary	Yugoslavia

== See also ==
- List of European Championships records in swimming
