= Viktor Krasko =

Soviet swimmer

Personal information
- Born: 1953 (age 72–73) Batumi, Georgia

Sport
- Sport: Swimming
- Club: Dynamo Batumi
Medal record
Representing Soviet Union
European Championships
| Bronze medal – third place | 1970 Barcelona | 4×100 m medley |

Viktor Krasko (Russian: Виктор Красько; born 1953) is a retired Soviet backstroke swimmer who won a bronze medal in the 4×100 m medley relay at the 1970 European Aquatics Championships.
