= Swimming at the 1986 World Aquatics Championships =

These are the results (medal winners) of the swimming competition at the 1986 World Aquatics Championships.

== Medal table ==
Rank	Nation	Gold	Silver	Bronze	Total
1	East Germany (GDR)	14	12	4	30
2	United States (USA)	7	7	10	24
3	West Germany (FRG)	4	2	1	7
4	Hungary (HUN)	3	0	0	3
5	Soviet Union (URS)	2	3	5	10
6	Canada (CAN)	1	2	2	5
7	Romania (ROU)	1	0	1	2
8	Italy (ITA)	0	2	0	2
9	Bulgaria (BUL)	0	1	1	2
9	Switzerland (SUI)	0	1	1	2
11	France (FRA)	0	1	0	1
11	New Zealand (NZL)	0	1	0	1
13	Netherlands (NED)	0	0	4	4
14	Great Britain (GBR)	0	0	2	2
15	Denmark (DEN)	0	0	1	1
Totals (15 entries)		32	32	32	96

== Medal summary ==
=== Men ===
Event	Gold	Silver	Bronze
50 m freestyle	Tom Jager (USA); 22.49	Dano Halsall (SUI); 22.80	Matt Biondi (USA); 22.85
100 m freestyle	Matt Biondi (USA); 48.94 CR	Stéphan Caron (FRA); 49.73	Tom Jager (USA); 49.79
200 m freestyle	Michael Gross (FRG); 1:47.92 CR	Sven Lodziewski (GDR); 1:49.12	Matt Biondi (USA); 1:49.43
400 m freestyle	Rainer Henkel (FRG); 3:50.05 CR	Uwe Daßler (GDR); 3:51.26	Dan Jorgensen (USA); 3:51.33
1500 m freestyle	Rainer Henkel (FRG); 15:05.31	Stefano Battistelli (ITA); 15:14.80	Dan Jorgensen (USA); 15:16.23
100 m backstroke	Igor Polyansky (URS); 55.58 CR	Dirk Richter (GDR); 56.49	Sergei Zabolotnov (URS); 56.57
200 m backstroke	Igor Polyansky (URS); 1:58.78 CR	Frank Baltrusch (GDR); 2:01.11	Frank Hoffmeister (FRG); 2:02.42
100 m breaststroke	Victor Davis (CAN); 1:02.71 CR	Gianni Minervini (ITA); 1:03.00	Dmitry Volkov (URS); 1:03.30
200 m breaststroke	József Szabó (HUN); 2:14.27 CR	Victor Davis (CAN); 2:14.93	Steve Bentley (USA); 2:16.51
100 m butterfly	Pablo Morales (USA); 53.54 CR	Matt Biondi (USA); 53.67	Andy Jameson (GBR); 53.81
200 m butterfly	Michael Gross (FRG); 1:56.53 CR	Anthony Mosse (NZL); 1:58.36	Benny Nielsen (DEN); 1:59.09
200 m individual medley	Tamás Darnyi (HUN); 2:01.57 CR	Alex Baumann (CAN); 2:02.34	Vadim Yaroshchuk (URS); 2:02.61
400 m individual medley	Tamás Darnyi (HUN); 4:18.98 CR	Vadim Yaroshchuk (URS); 4:22.03	Alex Baumann (CAN); 4:22.58
4 × 100 m freestyle relay	United States (USA); Tom Jager; Mike Heath; Paul Wallace; Matt Biondi; 3:19.89	Soviet Union (URS); Gennadiy Prigoda; Nikolay Yevseyev; Sergey Smiriyagin; Aleksey Markovsky; 3:21.14	East Germany (GDR); Dirk Richter; Jörg Woithe; Sven Lodziewski; Steffen Zesner; 3:21.47
4 × 200 m freestyle relay	East Germany (GDR); Lars Hinneburg; Thomas Flemming; Dirk Richter; Sven Lodziewski; 7:15.91 CR	West Germany (FRG); Rainer Henkel; Michael Gross; Alexander Schowtka; Thomas Fahrner; 7:15.96	United States (USA); Eric Boyer; Mike Heath; Dan Jorgensen; Matt Biondi; 7:18.29
4 × 100 m medley relay	United States (USA); Dan Veatch; David Lundberg; Pablo Morales; Matt Biondi; 3:41.25	West Germany (FRG); Frank Hoffmeister; Bert Göbel; Michael Gross; André Schadt; 3:42.26	Soviet Union (URS); Igor Polyansky; Dmitry Volkov; Aleksey Markovsky; Nikolay Yevseyev; 3:42.63

Legend: WR – World record; CR – Championship record

=== Women ===
Event	Gold	Silver	Bronze
50 m freestyle	Tamara Costache (ROU); 25.28 WR	Kristin Otto (GDR); 25.50	Marie-Thérèse Armentero (SUI); 25.93
100 m freestyle	Kristin Otto (GDR); 55.05 CR	Jenna Johnson (USA); 55.70	Conny van Bentum (NED); 55.79
200 m freestyle	Heike Friedrich (GDR); 1:58.26 CR	Manuela Stellmach (GDR); 1:58.90	Mary T. Meagher (USA); 2:00.14
400 m freestyle	Heike Friedrich (GDR); 4:07.45	Astrid Strauss (GDR); 4:09.16	Sarah Hardcastle (GBR); 4:09.85
800 m freestyle	Astrid Strauss (GDR); 8:28.24	Katja Hartmann (GDR); 8:28.44	Debbie Babashoff (USA); 8:34.04
100 m backstroke	Betsy Mitchell (USA); 1:01.74	Kathrin Zimmermann (GDR); 1:02.17	Natalya Shibayeva (URS); 1:02.25
200 m backstroke	Cornelia Sirch (GDR); 2:11.37	Betsy Mitchell (USA); 2:11.39	Kathrin Zimmermann (GDR); 2:11.45
100 m breaststroke	Sylvia Gerasch (GDR); 1:08.11 WR	Silke Hörner (GDR); 1:08.41	Tanya Bogomilova (BUL); 1:08.52
200 m breaststroke	Silke Hörner (GDR); 2:27.40 WR	Tanya Bogomilova (BUL); 2:27.66	Allison Higson (CAN); 2:31.34
100 m butterfly	Kornelia Greßler (GDR); 59.51	Kristin Otto (GDR); 59.66	Mary T. Meagher (USA); 59.98
200 m butterfly	Mary T. Meagher (USA); 2:08.41 CR	Kornelia Greßler (GDR); 2:10.66	Birte Weigang (GDR); 2:10.68
200 m individual medley	Kristin Otto (GDR); 2:15.56	Yelena Dendeberova (URS); 2:15.84	Kathleen Nord (GDR); 2:16.05
400 m individual medley	Kathleen Nord (GDR); 4:43.75	Michelle Griglione (USA); 4:44.07	Noemi Lung (ROU); 4:45.44
4 × 100 m freestyle relay	East Germany (GDR); Kristin Otto; Manuela Stellmach; Sabine Schulze; Heike Friedrich; 3:40.57 WR	United States (USA); Jenna Johnson; Dara Torres; Mary T. Meagher; Betsy Mitchell; 3:44.04	Netherlands (NED); Conny van Bentum; Laura Leideritz; Karin Brienesse; Annemarie Verstappen; 3:46.89
4 × 200 m freestyle relay	East Germany (GDR); Manuela Stellmach; Astrid Strauß; Nadja Bergknecht; Heike Friedrich; 7:59.33 WR	United States (USA); Betsy Mitchell; Mary T. Meagher; Kim Brown; Mary Wayte; 8:02.12	Netherlands (NED); Annemarie Verstappen; Jolande van der Meer; Marianne Muis; Conny van Bentum; 8:09.59
4 × 100 m medley relay	East Germany (GDR); Kathrin Zimmermann; Sylvia Gerasch; Kornelia Greßler; Kristin Otto; 4:04.82 CR	United States (USA); Betsy Mitchell; Jenny Hau; Mary T. Meagher; Jenna Johnson; 4:07.75	Netherlands (NED); Jolanda de Rover; Petra van Staveren; Conny van Bentum; Annemarie Verstappen; 4:10.70

Legend: WR – World record; CR – Championship record
