= Swimming at the 1988 Summer Olympics – Men's 400 metre freestyle =

Men's 400 metre freestyle at the Games of the XXIV Olympiad
- Venue: Jamsil Indoor Swimming Pool
- Date: 23 September 1988 (heats & finals)
- Competitors: 49 from 33 nations
- Winning time: 3:46.95 WR

Medalists
1st place, gold medalist(s)		Uwe Daßler	East Germany
2nd place, silver medalist(s)		Duncan Armstrong	Australia
3rd place, bronze medalist(s)		Artur Wojdat	Poland

The men's 400 metre freestyle event at the 1988 Summer Olympics took place on 23 September at the Jamsil Indoor Swimming Pool in Seoul, South Korea.

== Records ==
Prior to this competition, the existing world and Olympic records were as follows.

World record	Artur Wojdat (POL)	3:47.38	Orlando, United States	25 March 1988
Olympic record	Thomas Fahrner (FRG)	3:50.91	Los Angeles, United States	2 August 1984

The following records were established during the competition:

Date	Round	Name	Nationality	Time	Record
23 September	Heat 5	Mariusz Podkościelny	Poland	3:49.51	OR
23 September	Final A	Uwe Daßler	East Germany	3:46.95	WR

== Results ==
=== Heats ===
Rule: The eight fastest swimmers advance to final A (Q), while the next eight to final B (q).

Note: All eight swimmers who qualified for the Olympic final swam faster than the Olympic record time.

Rank	Heat	Name	Nationality	Time	Notes
1	5	Mariusz Podkościelny	Poland	3:49.51	Q, OR
2	5	Stefan Pfeiffer	West Germany	3:49.52	Q
3	7	Artur Wojdat	Poland	3:49.68	Q
4	7	Uwe Daßler	East Germany	3:49.90	Q
5	6	Kevin Boyd	Great Britain	3:50.01	Q
6	6	Anders Holmertz	Sweden	3:50.06	Q
7	7	Duncan Armstrong	Australia	3:50.64	Q
8	6	Matt Cetlinski	United States	3:50.82	Q
9	6	Ian Brown	Australia	3:51.09	q
10	5	Rainer Henkel	West Germany	3:51.50	q, WD
11	7	Dan Jorgensen	United States	3:52.64	q
12	6	Giorgio Lamberti	Italy	3:53.29	q, WD
13	5	Valter Kalaus	Hungary	3:53.44	q
14	5	Jörg Hoffmann	East Germany	3:53.78	q
15	6	Carlos Scanavino	Uruguay	3:54.86	q
16	4	Salvador Vassallo	Puerto Rico	3:55.30	q
17	7	Turlough O'Hare	Canada	3:55.35	q
18	6	Zoltán Szilágyi	Hungary	3:56.29	q
19	7	Roberto Gleria	Italy	3:56.33	
20	5	Darjan Petrič	Yugoslavia	3:56.94	
21	4	Henrik Jangvall	Sweden	3:57.41	
22	4	Daniel Serra	Spain	3:57.46	
23	5	Cristiano Michelena	Brazil	3:57.79	
24	4	Tony Day	Great Britain	3:57.91	
25	4	Alberto Bottini	Switzerland	3:57.92	
26	5	Gary Vandermeulen	Canada	3:57.99	
27	7	Aleksandr Bazhanov	Soviet Union	3:58.74	
28	3	Igor Majcen	Yugoslavia	3:58.90	
29	7	Jean-Marie Arnould	Belgium	3:59.91	
30	6	Franck Iacono	France	4:00.04	
31	4	Claus Christensen	Denmark	4:00.46	
32	4	Yoshiyuki Mizumoto	Japan	4:02.02	
33	3	David Castro	Brazil	4:02.48	
34	3	Ignacio Escamilla	Mexico	4:03.16	
35	3	Carlos Romo	Mexico	4:04.02	
36	3	Jeffrey Ong	Malaysia	4:04.57	
37	3	Ragnar Guðmundsson	Iceland	4:05.12	
38	4	Shigeo Ogata	Japan	4:05.68	
39	3	Yang Wook	South Korea	4:05.81	
40	2	Wu Ming-hsun	Chinese Taipei	4:06.66	
41	2	Jonathan Sakovich	Guam	4:06.89	
42	3	Kwon Soon-kun	South Korea	4:08.02	
43	2	Richard Sam Bera	Indonesia	4:08.70	
44	2	Desmond Koh	Singapore	4:15.54	
45	2	Arthur Li Kai Yien	Hong Kong	4:18.50	
46	2	Julian Bolling	Sri Lanka	4:18.88	
47	1	Bassam Al-Ansari	United Arab Emirates	4:39.36	
48	1	Émile Lahoud	Lebanon	4:47.09	
49	1	Mohamed Bin Abid	United Arab Emirates	4:47.28	

=== Finals ===
==== Final B ====
Rank	Lane	Name	Nationality	Time	Notes
9	6	Jörg Hoffmann	East Germany	3:52.13	
10	3	Valter Kalaus	Hungary	3:53.24	
11	1	Turlough O'Hare	Canada	3:54.33	
12	2	Carlos Scanavino	Uruguay	3:54.36	
13	4	Ian Brown	Australia	3:54.63	
14	5	Dan Jorgensen	United States	3:55.34	
15	7	Salvador Vassallo	Puerto Rico	3:55.39	
16	8	Zoltán Szilágyi	Hungary	3:56.00	

==== Final A ====
Rank	Lane	Name	Nationality	Time	Notes
1st place, gold medalist(s)	6	Uwe Daßler	East Germany	3:46.95	WR
2nd place, silver medalist(s)	1	Duncan Armstrong	Australia	3:47.15	OC
3rd place, bronze medalist(s)	3	Artur Wojdat	Poland	3:47.34	NR
4	8	Matt Cetlinski	United States	3:48.09	
5	4	Mariusz Podkościelny	Poland	3:48.59	
6	5	Stefan Pfeiffer	West Germany	3:49.96	
7	2	Kevin Boyd	Great Britain	3:50.16	
8	7	Anders Holmertz	Sweden	3:51.04	
