= Swimming at the 1988 Summer Olympics – Men's 4 × 200 metre freestyle relay =

Men's 4 × 200 metre freestyle relay at the Games of the XXIV Olympiad
- Venue: Jamsil Indoor Swimming Pool
- Date: 20 September 1988 (heats); 21 September 1988 (final)
- Competitors: 73 from 16 nations
- Winning time: 7:12.51 WR

Medalists
1st place, gold medalist(s)		Troy Dalbey, Matt Cetlinski, Doug Gjertsen, Matt Biondi, Craig Oppel*, Dan Jorgensen*	United States
2nd place, silver medalist(s)		Uwe Daßler, Sven Lodziewski, Thomas Flemming, Steffen Zesner, Lars Hinneburg*	East Germany
3rd place, bronze medalist(s)		Erik Hochstein, Thomas Fahrner, Rainer Henkel, Michael Gross, Peter Sitt*, Stefan Pfeiffer*; *Indicates the swimmer only competed in the preliminary heats.	West Germany

The men's 4 × 200 metre freestyle relay event at the 1988 Summer Olympics took place between 20–21 September at the Jamsil Indoor Swimming Pool in Seoul, South Korea.

== Records ==
Prior to this competition, the existing world and Olympic records were as follows.

World record	West Germany (FRG); Peter Sitt (1:48.94); Rainer Henkel (1:48.71); Thomas Fahrner (1:48.64); Michael Gross (1:46.81)	7:13.10	Strasbourg, France	19 August 1987
Olympic record	United States; Mike Heath (1:48.67); David Larson (1:49.01); Jeff Float (1:49.60); Bruce Hayes (1:48.41)	7:15.69	Los Angeles, United States	30 July 1984

The following new world and Olympic records were set during this competition.

Date	Event	Name	Nationality	Time	Record
21 September	Final	Troy Dalbey (1:49.37); Matt Cetlinski (1:48.44); Doug Gjertsen (1:48.26); Matt Biondi (1:46.44)	United States	7:12.51	WR

== Results ==
=== Heats ===
Rule: The eight fastest teams advance to the final (Q).

Rank	Heat	Nation	Swimmers	Time	Notes
1	1	East Germany	Uwe Daßler (1:49.47); Lars Hinneburg (1:49.64); Sven Lodziewski (1:48.87); Thomas Flemming (1:48.63)	7:16.61	Q
2	1	United States	Craig Oppel (1:51.24); Dan Jorgensen (1:49.24); Matt Cetlinski (1:48.87); Doug Gjertsen (1:49.41)	7:18.76	Q
3	2	West Germany	Peter Sitt (1:50.31); Rainer Henkel (1:49.63); Stefan Pfeiffer (1:50.06); Erik Hochstein (1:49.38)	7:19.38	Q
4	1	Australia	Jason Plummer (1:51.44); Ian Brown (1:48.89); Martin Roberts (1:51.31); Tom Stachewicz (1:49.82)	7:21.46	Q
5	1	Italy	Massimo Trevisan (1:50.95); Fabrizio Rampazzo (1:51.47); Valerio Giambalvo (1:50.97); Roberto Gleria (1:48.46)	7:21.85	Q
6	2	France	Stéphan Caron (1:49.41); Michel Pou (1:51.01); Olivier Fougeroud (1:51.62); Laurent Neuville (1:50.99)	7:23.03	Q
7	2	Sweden	Tommy Werner (1:50.46); Christer Wallin (1:50.38); Henrik Jangvall (1:52.33); Michael Söderlund (1:50.65)	7:23.82	Q
8	2	Canada	Turlough O'Hare (1:51.59); Darren Ward (1:52.27); Donald Haddow (1:51.11); Gary Vandermeulen (1:51.31)	7:26.28	Q
9	1	Great Britain	Kevin Boyd (1:52.00); Paul Howe (1:51.58); Jonathan Broughton (1:52.81); Roland Lee (1:53.38)	7:29.77	
10	2	Brazil	Cristiano Michelena (1:51.38); Jorge Fernandes (1:53.34); Emanuel Nascimento (1:54.26); Júlio López (1:53.13)	7:32.11	
11	1	Denmark	Franz Mortensen (1:51.21); Claus Christensen (1:52.08); Jan Larsen (1:52.61); Peter Rohde (1:57.41)	7:33.31	
12	1	South Korea	Kwon Sang-won (1:57.08); Yang Wook (1:57.29); Song Kwang-sun (1:59.11); Kwon Soon-kun (1:59.45)	7:52.93	
13	1	Virgin Islands	Hans Foerster (2:01.34); Kraig Singleton (2:05.63); Ronald Pickard (2:07.66); William Cleveland (2:00.88)	8:15.51	
14	2	United Arab Emirates	Ahmad Faraj (2:15.64); Mohamed Abdullah (2:17.64); Bassam Al-Ansari (2:15.41); Mohamed Bin Abid (2:12.34)	9:01.03	
	2	Mexico	Ignacio Escamilla; Jorge Alarcón; Carlos Romo; Rodrigo González	DSQ	
	2	Soviet Union	Sergey Kudryayev; Aleksandr Bazhanov; Nikolay Yevseyev; Aleksey Kuznetsov	DSQ	

=== Final ===
Rank	Lane	Nation	Swimmers	Time	Notes
1st place, gold medalist(s)	5	United States	Troy Dalbey (1:49.37); Matt Cetlinski (1:48.44); Doug Gjertsen (1:48.26); Matt Biondi (1:46.44)	7:12.51	WR
2nd place, silver medalist(s)	4	East Germany	Uwe Daßler (1:48.26); Sven Lodziewski (1:48.92); Thomas Flemming (1:48.07); Steffen Zesner (1:48.43)	7:13.68	NR
3rd place, bronze medalist(s)	3	West Germany	Erik Hochstein (1:49.91); Thomas Fahrner (1:47.75); Rainer Henkel (1:49.42); Michael Gross (1:47.27)	7:14.35	
4	6	Australia	Tom Stachewicz (1:48.99); Ian Brown (1:49.05); Jason Plummer (1:49.95); Duncan Armstrong (1:47.24)	7:15.23	OC
5	2	Italy	Roberto Gleria (1:49.23); Giorgio Lamberti (1:47.29); Massimo Trevisan (1:49.66); Valerio Giambalvo (1:49.82)	7:16.00	NR
6	1	Sweden	Anders Holmertz (1:48.06); Tommy Werner (1:49.41); Michael Söderlund (1:50.57); Christer Wallin (1:51.06)	7:19.10	
7	7	France	Michel Pou (1:52.05); Franck Iacono (1:50.04); Olivier Fougeroud (1:52.14); Ludovic Depickère (1:50.46)	7:24.69	
8	8	Canada	Turlough O'Hare (1:51.45); Sandy Goss (1:51.01); Donald Haddow (1:51.46); Gary Vandermeulen (1:50.99)	7:24.91	
