= Adrian Moorhouse =

British swimmer (born 1964)

Adrian Moorhouse MBE
Personal information
- Full name: Adrian David Moorhouse
- National team: Great Britain
- Born: 24 May 1964 (age 62) Bradford, England
- Height: 1.87 m (6 ft 2 in)
- Weight: 87 kg (192 lb; 13.7 st)

Sport
- Sport: Swimming
- Strokes: Breaststroke
- Club: City of Leeds SC
Medal record
Men's swimming
Representing Great Britain
Olympic Games
Gold medal – first place	1988 Seoul	100 m breaststroke
World Championships (LC)
Silver medal – second place	1991 Perth	100 m breaststroke
European Championships (LC)
Gold medal – first place	1983 Rome	200 m breaststroke
Gold medal – first place	1985 Sofia	100 m breaststroke
Gold medal – first place	1987 Strasbourg	100 m breaststroke
Gold medal – first place	1989 Bonn	100 m breaststroke
Silver medal – second place	1983 Rome	100 m breaststroke
Silver medal – second place	1987 Strasbourg	4×100 m medley
Silver medal – second place	1991 Athens	100 m breaststroke
Bronze medal – third place	1981 Split	200 m breaststroke
Bronze medal – third place	1987 Strasbourg	200 m breaststroke
Representing England
Commonwealth Games
Gold medal – first place	1982 Brisbane	100 m breaststroke
Gold medal – first place	1986 Edinburgh	200 m breaststroke
Gold medal – first place	1990 Auckland	100 m breaststroke
Silver medal – second place	1982 Brisbane	4×100 m medley
Silver medal – second place	1986 Edinburgh	100 m breaststroke
Silver medal – second place	1986 Edinburgh	4×100 m medley
Silver medal – second place	1990 Auckland	4×100 m medley
Bronze medal – third place	1982 Brisbane	200 m breaststroke

Adrian David Moorhouse MBE (born 24 May 1964) is an English former competitive swimmer who dominated British swimming in the late 1980s. He won the gold medal in the 100-metre breaststroke at the 1988 Summer Olympics in Seoul, Korea. Since then Moorhouse, a former pupil of Bradford Grammar School, has translated his sporting success to a successful career in the business world, as managing director of Lane4, a consultancy helping individuals and teams around the world reach their fullest potential.

He was voted Best Leader at the Sunday Times Best Small Companies to Work for in 2009 and 2007 and has been listed in HR Magazine's Most Influential UK Thinkers since 2010. He is also a swimming commentator for BBC television.

== Swimming career ==
Moorhouse was born in Bradford, Yorkshire, attended Bradford Grammar School and went to 3rd Shipley (St Peter's) Scouts.

Moorhouse's inspiration to become seriously involved in national and international competitive swimming came at the age of 12 when he watched David Wilkie win gold at the Montreal Olympics. In 1980 he was selected for the England Junior team and broke the national junior records for both the 100 m and 200 m breaststroke. When he was 15, he was chosen for the national senior squad, number two to the gold medallist at the Moscow Olympics, Duncan Goodhew.

Moorhouse became Britain's number one breaststroke swimmer in 1981 when he won a bronze medal for the 200 m in the European Championships in Yugoslavia. The following year he gained his first taste of gold after winning the 100 m breaststroke at the Commonwealth Games in Australia, in a new British Record of 1:02.93, along with a bronze in the 200m breaststroke. In the World Championships in Guayaquil shortly before, he missed bronze by just 2/100th of a second in the 100m breaststroke behind (future) 1984 Olympic Champions Steve Lundquist (USA) and Victor Davis (CAN), and future world record holder John Moffet (USA). The following year he was back to winning ways taking gold in the 200m breaststroke at the 1983 European Championships in Rome together with a silver in the 100m.

At the Los Angeles Olympics in 1984, Moorhouse was tipped for a gold medal in the 100 m breaststroke but missed out completely, coming fourth behind Steve Lundquist of the USA who won gold in a new world record of 1:01.65 swimming in the adjacent lane. "I was devastated", he says. "After the Games I convinced myself that I had no talent and that I was never going to win again. I didn't want anything to do with swimming.”

On New Year's Eve 1984, Moorhouse stayed home alone to reflect and decided to train for a competition in April 1985 as a 'last roll of the dice' to see whether he had what it took to conquer the world. His decision was vindicated when he broke the World Short Course (25 m pool) record for the 100 m in a time of 1:00.58, and went on to win the European Championships gold medal in Bulgaria in a time of 1:02.99.

The year 1986 was a bittersweet one for Moorhouse. At the Commonwealth Games in Edinburgh, he narrowly took silver in the 100m breaststroke behind long-time rival Victor Davis of Canada. However, he put his disappointment behind him to turn the tables on Davis in the 200m breaststroke a few days later, an event in which the Canadian had been heavily favoured as the reigning Olympic Champion and world record holder. Overtaking Davis in the second half of the race, Moorhouse took gold in a personal best and new English record of 2:16.35.

A month later in Madrid, Moorhouse qualified fastest for the 100m breaststroke final at the World Championships in a new European record of 1:02.28. In the final, he powered to the front in the second 50m to beat Victor Davis convincingly and win the race in another European record of 1:02.01. However, he was then controversially disqualified for an alleged dolphin kick at the turn, promoting Davis to gold. (FINA, swimming's world governing body, changed the breaststroke rules in 2005 to permit a single dolphin kick at the start and turn in recognition of the fact that this is often an unintended and involuntary reaction to the underwater pullout.) Despite his natural disappointment, though, Moorhouse finished the year ranked first in the world for the 100m breaststroke for the first time, a position he retained for the next four years.

In 1987, putting the Madrid episode behind him, Moorhouse set a world short-course record, in a competition in Bonn, by becoming the first person to swim 100 m breaststroke in less than a minute, out-swimming the former world record holder, Rolf Beab in a time of 59.75 s. Later that year, at the European Championships in Strasbourg, Moorhouse retained his 100m title in a new European record of 1:02.13, before taking bronze in the 200m breaststroke in a personal best of 2:15.78 for good measure.

Moorhouse started Olympic year, 1988, on the right note by winning the 100 m breaststroke at the US Indoor Championships to confirm his status as number one in the world. In September he achieved a lifetime's ambition at Seoul when, following in the footsteps of David Wilkie and Duncan Goodhew, he won Olympic gold in the 100 m breaststroke in a time of 1:02.04, overtaking Dmitry Volkov (URS) and Károly Güttler (HUN) at the wall, in a characteristic finishing surge, to win by 1/100 of a second in the closest race of those Olympics.

Having finally achieved his Olympic dream, Moorhouse entered 1989 with an aura of invincibility. In the heats of the 100m breaststroke at the European Championships in Bonn, he achieved another lifetime's ambition when he set a new world record of 1:01.49. Notably, he broke the record set by Steve Lundquist in the 1984 Olympics, in the lane adjacent to Moorhouse, adding extra significance to his achievement. In the final, he secured his hat-trick of European golds in this event, winning in 1:01.71.

In 1990, he equaled his own 100m breaststroke world record of 1:01.49 twice: first, to win gold at the Commonwealth Games in Auckland; and second, in the summer's British Championships at a time when the World Championships had initially been scheduled. However, due to the host city Perth (AUS) being in the Southern Hemisphere, the World Championships were postponed until January 1991 to coincide with summer. Here, Moorhouse swam another fantastic time of 1:01.58 but had to settle for silver behind a new world record and breakthrough performance from Hungary's Norbert Rózsa. (It is worth noting that the FINA World Championships were moved from a four-year cycle to a two-year cycle a decade later. Had that been the case in the late 1980s, then Moorhouse may well have won two world titles given that he was ranked first in the world for the five-year period from 1986 to 1990.)

Later in 1991, he again took silver behind Norbert Rózsa in the European Championships in Athens in a time of 1:01.89, his final major medal and his fifth consecutive podium placing in this event. The following year, he qualified for the final of the 100m breaststroke at the 1992 Summer Olympics in Barcelona, but faded in the final to finish 8th.

In the late 1980s, Adrian Moorhouse was one of Britain's most successful sportspeople, finishing as runner-up in the BBC's Sports Personality of the Year contest in 1988 following his Olympic win. His achievements continued the tradition of successful British men's breaststroke swimming that had started with Olympic golds from David Wilkie in 1976 and Duncan Goodhew in 1980. Moorhouse himself then inspired a new generation of British male breaststroke swimmers, excluding his domestic rival, double Olympic medalist Nick Gillingham names started with 2003 World Champion James Gibson, and more recently 2012 Olympic silver medalist Michael Jamieson, and, most notably, reigning Olympic, World, European, and Commonwealth Champion and world record holder in the 50m and 100m breaststroke, Adam Peaty, on whose 2016 Olympic victory Moorhouse commentated for BBC television alongside his former Olympic teammate and butterfly medalist Andy Jameson.

Throughout his career he regularly participated in the ASA National Championships and won 16 titles. The 50 metres breaststroke title in 1991 and 1992, the 100 metres breaststroke title in 1981, 1982, 1983, 1985, 1986, 1987, 1989, 1990 and 1991 and the 200 metres breaststroke title in 1981, 1982, 1983, 1985 and 1986.

== Rivalry with Victor Davis ==
Canadian Victor Davis first encountered Moorhouse at the 1982 Commonwealth Games in Brisbane when Davis took gold in the 200 m breaststroke, and Moorhouse took the gold in the 100 m breaststroke. They met again later at the 1982 World Championships in Guayaquil, Ecuador, but this time Davis had the upper hand in both events, taking the gold in the 200 m and silver in the 100 m. Moorhouse, also in his first World Championships, finished fifth in the 100 m, and seventh in the 200 m.

Their next encounter was at the 1984 Olympics and it seemed that both their chances were enhanced by the boycott of East Germany and the Soviet Union. The 1984 Games were perhaps Victor Davis' finest competition, as he took gold in the 200 m and silver in the 100 m. Meanwhile, Moorhouse suffered badly. Having had severe tonsillitis just days before the start of the Games, he finished fourth in the 100 m and sixth in the 200 m. Davis, now at the pinnacle of his swimming career, was voted into the Canadian Olympic Hall of Fame. At the time of the 1986 Commonwealth Games in Edinburgh, Victor Davis took gold in the 100 m event. Now the European Champion, Moorhouse, surprised Davis by sneaking the gold in the 200 m event.

By the time of the 1986 World Championships in Madrid, the world swimming media were hyping up the 100 m breaststroke event as 'the event of the championships', knowing that it would inevitably prove to be another great battle between Davis and Moorhouse. Davis couldn't contain Moorhouse over the final 25 m, and Moorhouse took the 100 m gold in a new European Record of 1.02.01 secs. Davis took the silver in 1:02.71.

The officials disqualified Moorhouse for an 'illegal turn', claiming he had used a butterfly kicking action during the underwater phase of the 50 m turn. TV crews from around the world began to analyse the footage of the 'illegal turn' from all conceivable angles, but each time it looked perfectly sound.

The call of the 'turn judge' was upheld on appeal and Davis was awarded the gold medal. Davis went on to take silver in the 200 m breaststroke – beaten by Hungarian József Szabó. Moorhouse withdrew from the 200 m event with a strained adductor muscle. The final encounter between Davis and Moorhouse at the 1988 Olympic Games in Seoul, which proved to be Davis' final international competition. Both had announced before the Games that the 100 m event would be their main priority. Davis had performed poorly at the Canadian Olympic Trials, and had not been selected for the 200 m breaststroke, while Moorhouse was ranked number one in the world, and his lifetime best of 1:01.78 was close to the world record 1:01.65.

Davis, still the Canadian record holder at 1:01.99, was only ranked sixth in the world going into the 1988 Olympics and no-one really knew what kind of shape he was going to be in. In the morning heats, Davis looked very impressive. He led the field from the start, and easily won his heat in a time of 1:02.48. Moorhouse was able to qualify in a faster time, winning his heat in 1:02.19. After one false start, Moorhouse looked the more nervous of the two behind the starting blocks. Meanwhile, Davis looked calm. At the second start, both Davis and Dmitri Volkov of the USSR began strongly, leaving Moorhouse slightly trailing. Volkov opened a 2-metre lead over the first 50 m, and Davis was matched stroke for stroke by Moorhouse. Volkov touched first at the 50 m mark in 28.12 s, setting a new 50 metre breaststroke world record. Moorhouse turned sixth in 29.42 s, and Davis turned seventh in 29.46 s. Volkov extended his lead, and as he reached the 75 m mark, he looked a certainty for the gold medal. He was 3–4 metres ahead of Moorhouse, Davis and Károly Güttler of Hungary. At this point Davis and Moorhouse closed in on Volkov. Moorhouse took the gold in 1:02.04, just ahead of Guttler's time of 1:02.05. The bronze medal was won by Volkov, in a time of 1:02.20, leaving Davis in fourth place, with a time of 1:02.38.

== Later career and retirement ==
In 1989 Moorhouse was appointed MBE. He remained as the world number one until 1991 but at the Barcelona Olympic Games he finished eighth in the final and soon retired from swimming.

He has since worked as a management consultant. Moorhouse was chosen as an official Team GB Ambassador for London 2012 Games and was also a torchbearer.

In 2013, he received an Honorary Doctorate from Loughborough University.

== See also ==
- List of members of the International Swimming Hall of Fame
- List of Commonwealth Games medallists in swimming (men)
- List of Olympic medalists in swimming (men)
- World record progression 100 metres breaststroke

Awards
Preceded by Giorgio Lamberti	European Swimmer of the Year; 1990	Succeeded by Tamás Darnyi
