= Swimming at the 1988 Summer Olympics – Men's 1500 metre freestyle =

Men's 1500 metre freestyle at the Games of the XXIV Olympiad
- Venue: Jamsil Indoor Swimming Pool
- Date: 24 September 1988 (heats); 25 September 1988 (final)
- Competitors: 35 from 22 nations
- Winning time: 15:00.40

Medalists
| 1st place, gold medalist(s) | | Vladimir Salnikov | Soviet Union |
| 2nd place, silver medalist(s) | | Stefan Pfeiffer | West Germany |
| 3rd place, bronze medalist(s) | | Uwe Daßler | East Germany |

The men's 1500 metre freestyle event at the 1988 Summer Olympics took place on 23 September at the Jamsil Indoor Swimming Pool in Seoul, South Korea.

== Records ==
Prior to this competition, the existing world and Olympic records were as follows.

| World record | Vladimir Salnikov (URS) | 14:54.76 | Moscow, Soviet Union | 22 February 1983 |
| Olympic record | Vladimir Salnikov (URS) | 14:58.27 | Moscow, Soviet Union | 22 July 1980 |

== Results ==
=== Heats ===
Rule: The eight fastest swimmers advance to final A (Q).

| Rank | Heat | Name | Nationality | Time | Notes |
|---|---|---|---|---|---|
| 1 | 5 | Matt Cetlinski | United States | 15:07.41 | Q |
| 2 | 4 | Vladimir Salnikov | Soviet Union | 15:07.83 | Q |
| 3 | 3 | Stefan Pfeiffer | West Germany | 15:07.85 | Q |
| 4 | 4 | Uwe Daßler | East Germany | 15:08.91 | Q |
| 5 | 4 | Mariusz Podkościelny | Poland | 15:11.19 | Q |
| 6 | 4 | Jörg Hoffmann | East Germany | 15:14.13 | Q, WD |
| 7 | 5 | Rainer Henkel | West Germany | 15:14.64 | Q |
| 8 | 5 | Darjan Petrič | Yugoslavia | 15:16.99 | Q |
| 9 | 3 | Kevin Boyd | Great Britain | 15:17.56 | Q |
| 10 | 5 | Luca Pellegrini | Italy | 15:18.80 | |
| 11 | 4 | Michael McKenzie | Australia | 15:19.36 | |
| 12 | 3 | Christophe Marchand | France | 15:22.19 | |
| 13 | 4 | Franck Iacono | France | 15:22.66 | |
| 14 | 5 | Jason Plummer | Australia | 15:22.85 | |
| 15 | 2 | Valter Kalaus | Hungary | 15:23.01 | |
| 16 | 3 | Christopher Chalmers | Canada | 15:23.22 | |
| 17 | 5 | Stefan Persson | Sweden | 15:24.33 | |
| 18 | 4 | Igor Majcen | Yugoslavia | 15:29.16 | |
| 19 | 3 | Harry Taylor | Canada | 15:30.31 | |
| 20 | 3 | Stefano Battistelli | Italy | 15:36.54 | |
| 21 | 4 | Artur Wojdat | Poland | 15:37.52 | |
| 22 | 5 | Tony Day | Great Britain | 15:38.75 | |
| 23 | 3 | Lars Jorgensen | United States | 15:39.51 | |
| 24 | 5 | Wang Dali | China | 15:45.96 | |
| 25 | 2 | Masashi Kato | Japan | 15:47.35 | |
| 26 | 2 | Cristiano Michelena | Brazil | 15:50.50 | |
| 27 | 2 | Yoshiyuki Mizumoto | Japan | 15:52.06 | |
| 28 | 2 | Norbert Ágh | Hungary | 15:52.80 | |
| 29 | 2 | Jeffrey Ong | Malaysia | 15:53.67 | |
| 30 | 2 | Artur Costa | Portugal | 15:56.13 | |
| 31 | 2 | Ragnar Guðmundsson | Iceland | 15:57.54 | |
| 32 | 3 | David Castro | Brazil | 15:57.89 | |
| 33 | 1 | Wu Ming-hsun | Chinese Taipei | 15:59.74 | |
| 34 | 1 | Yang Wook | South Korea | 16:21.10 | |
| 35 | 1 | Jonathan Sakovich | Guam | 16:26.77 | |

=== Final ===
| Rank | Lane | Name | Nationality | Time | Notes |
|---|---|---|---|---|---|
| 1st place, gold medalist(s) | 5 | Vladimir Salnikov | Soviet Union | 15:00.40 | |
| 2nd place, silver medalist(s) | 3 | Stefan Pfeiffer | West Germany | 15:02.69 | |
| 3rd place, bronze medalist(s) | 6 | Uwe Daßler | East Germany | 15:06.15 | |
| 4 | 4 | Matthew Cetlinski | United States | 15:06.42 | |
| 5 | 2 | Mariusz Podkościelny | Poland | 15:14.76 | |
| 6 | 7 | Rainer Henkel | West Germany | 15:18.19 | |
| 7 | 8 | Kevin Boyd | Great Britain | 15:21.16 | |
| 8 | 1 | Darjan Petrič | Yugoslavia | 15:37.12 | |
