= 1985 European Aquatics Championships =

Water sport competitions

17th European Aquatics Championships
- Host city: Sofia, Bulgaria
- Date: 4–11 August 1985
- Events: 39

The 1985 European Aquatics Championships were held in "Cherveno zname" swim complex in Sofia, Bulgaria from 4 August until 11 August 1985. Besides swimming there were titles contested in diving, synchronized swimming and water polo. The first ever women's tournament at the European Championships was played in Oslo, Norway.

== Medal table ==
* Host nation (Bulgaria)

Rank	Nation	Gold	Silver	Bronze	Total
1	East Germany	17	17	6	40
2	Soviet Union	7	4	6	17
3	West Germany	6	4	7	17
4	Great Britain	2	3	1	6
5	France	2	2	0	4
6	Hungary	2	1	0	3
7	Bulgaria*	1	2	4	7
8	Netherlands	1	1	6	8
9	Austria	1	0	1	2
10	Sweden	0	1	3	4
11	Czechoslovakia	0	1	1	2
12	Denmark	0	1	0	1
12	Portugal	0	1	0	1
12	Yugoslavia	0	1	0	1
15	Italy	0	0	2	2
15	Switzerland	0	0	2	2
Totals (16 entries)		39	39	39	117

== Swimming ==
=== Men's events ===
Event	Gold	Silver	Bronze
100 m freestyle	Stéphan Caron (FRA)	Jörg Woithe (GDR)	Stefan Volery (SUI)
200 m freestyle	Michael Groß (FRG)	Sven Lodziewski (GDR)	Tommy Werner (SWE)
400 m freestyle	Uwe Dassler (GDR)	Sven Lodziewski (GDR)	Rainer Henkel (FRG)
1500 m freestyle	Uwe Dassler (GDR)	Rainer Henkel (FRG)	Stefan Pfeiffer (FRG)
100 m backstroke	Igor Polyansky (URS)	Dirk Richter (GDR)	Sergei Zabolotnov (URS)
200 m backstroke	Igor Polyansky (URS)	Sergei Zabolotnov (URS)	Frank Baltrusch (GDR)
100 m breaststroke	Adrian Moorhouse (GBR)	Rolf Beab (FRG)	Dmitry Volkov (URS)
200 m breaststroke	Dmitry Volkov (URS)	Alexandre Yokochi (POR)	Étienne Dagon (SUI)
100 m butterfly	Michael Groß (FRG)	Andy Jameson (GBR)	Marcel Gery (TCH)
200 m butterfly	Michael Groß (FRG)	Benny Nielsen (DEN)	Frank Drost (NED)
200 m individual medley	Tamás Darnyi (HUN)	Josef Hladký (TCH)	Peter Bermel (FRG)
400 m individual medley	Tamás Darnyi (HUN)	Vadim Yaroshchuk (URS)	Raik Hannemann (GDR)
4 × 100 m freestyle relay	West Germany; Alexander Schowtka; Thomas Fahrner; Dirk Korthals; Michael Groß	East Germany; Dirk Richter; Sven Lodziewski; Lars Hinneburg; Jörg Woithe	Sweden; Tommy Werner; Michael Söderlund; Bengt Baron; Per Johansson
4 × 200 m freestyle relay	West Germany; Alexander Schowtka; Michael Groß; André Schadt; Thomas Fahrner	Sweden; Anders Holmertz; Robert Johnsson; Michael Söderlund; Tommy Werner	Netherlands; Edsard Schlingemann; Hans Kroes; Patrick Dybiona; Frank Drost
4 × 100 m medley relay	West Germany; Thomas Lebherz; Rolf Beab; Michael Groß; Alexander Schowtka	East Germany; Dirk Richter; Ingo Grzywotz; Thomas Dressler; Jörg Woithe	Italy; Mauro Marini; Gianni Minervini; Fabrizio Rampazzo; Andrea Ceccarini

=== Women's events ===
Event	Gold	Silver	Bronze
100 m freestyle	Heike Friedrich (GDR)	Manuela Stellmach (GDR)	Conny van Bentum (NED)
200 m freestyle	Heike Friedrich (GDR)	Manuela Stellmach (GDR)	Vania Argirova (BUL)
400 m freestyle	Astrid Strauss (GDR)	Anke Möhring (GDR)	Yelena Dendeberova (URS)
800 m freestyle	Astrid Strauss (GDR)	Sarah Hardcastle (GBR)	Anke Möhring (GDR)
100 m backstroke	Birte Weigang (GDR)	Kathrin Zimmermann (GDR)	Natalya Shibayeva (URS)
200 m backstroke	Cornelia Sirch (GDR)	Kathrin Zimmermann (GDR)	Jolanda de Rover (NED)
100 m breaststroke	Sylvia Gerasch (GDR)	Silke Hörner (GDR)	Tanya Bogomilova (BUL)
200 m breaststroke	Tanya Bogomilova (BUL)	Sylvia Gerasch (GDR)	Silke Hörner (GDR)
100 m butterfly	Kornelia Gressler (GDR)	Birte Weigang (GDR)	Tatyana Kurnikova (URS)
200 m butterfly	Jacqueline Alex (GDR)	Kornelia Gressler (GDR)	Petra Zindler (FRG)
200 m individual medley	Kathleen Nord (GDR)	Sonia Blagoeva (BUL)	Susanne Börnike (GDR)
400 m individual medley	Kathleen Nord (GDR)	Cornelia Sirch (GDR)	Sonia Blagoeva (BUL)
4 × 100 m freestyle relay	East Germany; Astrid Strauss; Karen König; Manuela Stellmach; Heike Friedrich	Germany; Iris Zscherpe; Susanne Schuster; Christiane Pielke; Karin Seick	Netherlands; Conny van Bentum; Ilse Oegama; Karin Brienesse; Annemarie Verstappen
4 × 200 m freestyle relay	East Germany; Astrid Strauss; Karen König; Manuela Stellmach; Heike Friedrich	Netherlands; Jolande van der Meer; Ilse Oegama; Mildred Muis; Conny van Bentum	Sweden; Suzanne Nilsson; Maria Kardum; Agneta Eriksson; Eva Nyberg
4 × 100 m medley relay	East Germany; Birte Weigang; Sylvia Gerasch; Kornelia Gressler; Heike Friedrich	Soviet Union; Natalya Shibaeva; Svetlana Kuzmina; Tatyana Kurnikova; Yelena Dendeberova	Bulgaria; Bistra Gospodinova; Tanya Bogomilova; Radovesta Pironkova; Vania Argirova

== Diving ==
=== Men's events ===
Event	Gold	Silver	Bronze
3 m springboard	Nikolay Drozhin (URS)	Petar Georgiev (BUL)	Dieter Dörr (FRG)
10 m platform	Thomas Knuths (GDR)	Albin Killat (FRG)	Domenico Rinaldo (ITA)

=== Women's events ===
Event	Gold	Silver	Bronze
3 m springboard	Zhanna Tsirulnikova (URS)	Irina Sidorova (URS)	Brita Baldus (GDR)
10 m platform	Anzhela Stasyulevich (URS)	Ramona Pätow-Wenzel (GDR)	Alla Lobankina (URS)

== Synchronized swimming ==
Event	Gold	Silver	Bronze
Solo	Carolyn Wilson (GBR)	Muriel Hermine (FRA)	Alexandra Worisch (AUT)
Duet	Eva-Maria Edinger (AUT); Alexandra Worisch (AUT)	Muriel Hermine (FRA); Pascale Besson (FRA)	Amanda Dodd (GBR); Carolyn Wilson (GBR)
Team competition	France (FRA); Pascale Besson; Anne Capron; Catherine Hameon; Muriel Hermine; Anne-Caroline Mathieu; Sylvie Moisson; Odile Petit; Karine Schuler	Great Britain (GBR); Nicola Batchelor; Georgina Coombs; Amanda Dodd; Jackie Dodd; Alison Garrett; Tracy Golding; Nicola Shearn; Carolyn Wilson	Netherlands (NED); Miranda Boerboom; Angelique Friebel; Joanni Janssen; Marion Jansen; Anita van Paassen; Marjolijn Philipsen; Marielle van der Heyde; Marjolijn van Kolck

== Water polo ==
=== Men's event ===
Event	Gold	Silver	Bronze
Team competition	Soviet Union	Yugoslavia	West Germany

=== Women's event ===
Event	Gold	Silver	Bronze
Team competition	Netherlands	Hungary	West Germany
