= Sylvia Gerasch =

East German swimmer

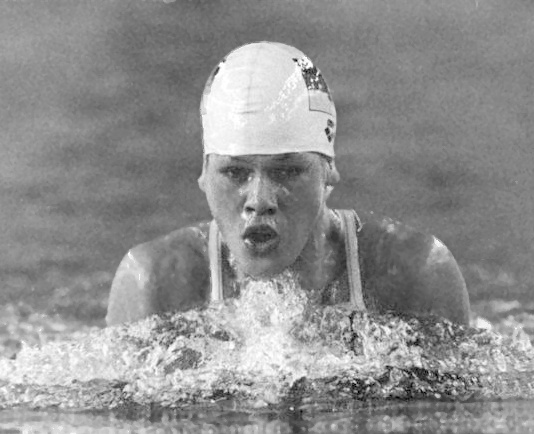
- Sylvia Gerasch in 1987

Personal information
- Born: 16 March 1969 (age 57) Cottbus, East Germany
- Height: 1.74 m (5 ft 9 in)
- Weight: 62 kg (137 lb)

Sport
- Sport: Swimming
- Club: Berliner SC, SC Dynamo Berlin
Medal record
Representing East Germany
World Championships (LC)
Gold medal – first place	1986 Madrid	100 m breaststroke
Gold medal – first place	1986 Madrid	4×100 m medley
European Championships (LC)
Gold medal – first place	1985 Sofia	100 m breaststroke
Silver medal – second place	1983 Rome	100 m breaststroke
Silver medal – second place	1983 Rome	200 m breaststroke
Bronze medal – third place	1987 Strasbourg	100 m breaststroke
Friendship Games
Gold medal – first place	1984 Moscow	100 m breaststroke
Representing Germany
European Championships (LC)
Gold medal – first place	1993 Sheffield	100 m breaststroke
Gold medal – first place	1993 Sheffield	4×100 m medley
Gold medal – first place	1997 Seville	4×100 m medley
Silver medal – second place	1991 Athens	4×100 m medley
Silver medal – second place	2000 Helsinki	100 m breaststroke
Bronze medal – third place	2000 Helsinki	50 m breaststroke
European Championships (SC)
Gold medal – first place	1991 Gelsenkirchen	4x50 m medley
Gold medal – first place	1993 Gateshead	50 m breaststroke
Gold medal – first place	1993 Gateshead	4x50 m medley
Gold medal – first place	1996 Rostock	4x50 m medley
Gold medal – first place	1998 Sheffield	50 m breaststroke
Gold medal – first place	1998 Sheffield	4x50 m medley
Silver medal – second place	1991 Gelsenkirchen	50 m breaststroke
Silver medal – second place	2000 Valencia	4x50 m medley
Bronze medal – third place	1993 Gateshead	100 m medley

Sylvia Gerasch (born 16 March 1969) is a former swimmer who competed for East Germany and Germany.

== Career ==
Gerasch was fifteen years old when she participated in the 1983 European Championships and placed second behind Ute Geweniger in the 100 m and 200 m breaststroke. In the subsequent European championships she won her first international title in the 100 m breaststroke. Due to the boycotted the 1984 Summer Olympics in Los Angeles, she participated in Friendship Games, in which she won the gold medal and set a world record for 1 minute 08.29 seconds in 100 m breaststroke.

At the 1986 World Aquatics Championships, she won the 100 m breaststroke and the 4×100 m medley relay, together with teammates Kristin Otto, Kathrin Zimmermann and Kornelia Gressler. In October 1986, she was awarded a Star of People's Friendship in gold (second class) for her sporting success.

Her first and only Olympic appearance was at the 2000 Sydney Olympics, where she competed for a unified Germany and finished eighth in the 100 m breaststroke; she was also part of the fourth-place German 4×100 m medley relay team.

== Doping ==
Dieter Lindemann was accused of giving Gerasch anabolics when she was thirteen years old. Gerasch claimed that Lindemann gave her pink tablets which she did not take. She claimed that some competitors put the tablets in the aquarium, and that the female fish became more colourful like the male ones.

Following a test at the European Sprint Swimming Championships 1993 in Gateshead in November 1993, Gerasch was suspended in January 1994 for two years for having 16 mg of caffeine, equivalent to six cups of coffee, in her blood compared to the permitted limit of 12 mg. The German Swimming Association shortened the suspension for national competitions. In November 1995, the compulsory ban for caffeine was reduced from two years to three months, and in Autumn 2003, caffeine was removed from the list of banned substances.
