= Babashoff =

Babashoff is a surname. Notable people with this surname includes:

- Deborah Babashoff (born 1970), former competitive swimmer
- Jack Babashoff (born 1955), American former competitive swimmer
- Shirley Babashoff (born 1957), American former competitive swimmer
