= Sven Lodziewski =

East German swimmer

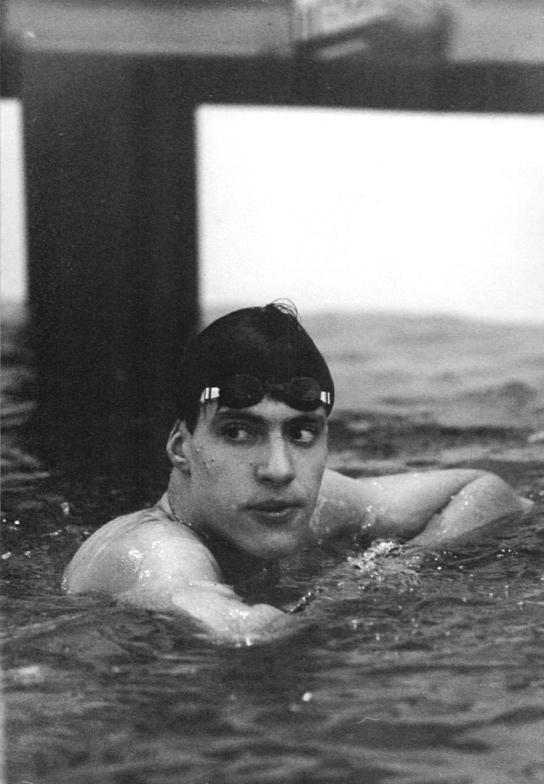

Medal record

Men's swimming

Representing East Germany

Friendship Games
Gold medal – first place	1984 Moscow	200 m freestyle
Gold medal – first place	1984 Moscow	4×200 m freestyle relay
Silver medal – second place	1984 Moscow	400 m freestyle
Silver medal – second place	1984 Moscow	4×100 m medley relay
Silver medal – second place	1984 Moscow	4×100 m freestyle relay

Olympic Games
Silver medal – second place	1988 Seoul	4×200 m freestyle

World Championships (LC)

Representing East Germany
Gold medal – first place	1986 Madrid	4×200 m freestyle
Silver medal – second place	1986 Madrid	200 m freestyle
Bronze medal – third place	1986 Madrid	4×100 m freestyle

Representing Germany
Bronze medal – third place	2001 Fukuoka	4×100 m freestyle

European Championships (LC)

Representing East Germany
Gold medal – first place	1987 Strasbourg	100 m freestyle
Gold medal – first place	1987 Strasbourg	4×100 m freestyle
Silver medal – second place	1983 Rome	4×200 m freestyle
Silver medal – second place	1985 Sofia	200 m freestyle
Silver medal – second place	1985 Sofia	400 m freestyle
Silver medal – second place	1985 Sofia	4×100 m freestyle
Silver medal – second place	1987 Strasbourg	4×200 m freestyle
Bronze medal – third place	1983 Rome	4×100 m freestyle
Bronze medal – third place	1987 Strasbourg	4×100 m medley

Sven Lodziewski (born 17 March 1965 in Leipzig, Saxony) is a former freestyle swimmer from East Germany, who competed for his native country at the 1988 Summer Olympics.

There he won the silver medal in the 4×200 metres freestyle, alongside Uwe Dassler, Thomas Flemming, and Steffen Zesner. He swam for SC Dynamo Berlin.

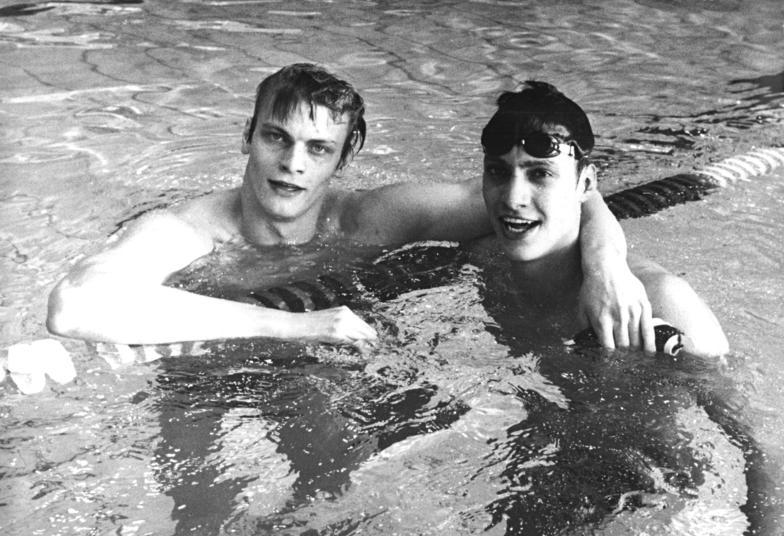
Lodziewski with fellow GDR swimmer Jörg Woithe.
