= Sergey Kudryayev =

Russian swimmer

Personal information
- Nationality: Russian
- Born: 1 September 1969 (age 56)

Sport
- Sport: Swimming

Sergey Kudryayev (born 1 September 1969) is a Russian swimmer. He competed in the men's 4 × 200 metre freestyle relay at the 1988 Summer Olympics representing the Soviet Union.
