= Andy Jameson =

English sports commentator and former swimmer (born 1965)

Andrew Jameson
Personal information
- Full name: Andrew David Jameson
- National team: Great Britain
- Born: 19 February 1965 (age 61) Crosby, England
- Height: 1.90 m (6 ft 3 in)
- Weight: 79 kg (174 lb; 12.4 st)

Sport
- Sport: Swimming
- Strokes: Butterfly, freestyle
- Club: City of Liverpool SC
- College team: Arizona State University (US)
Medal record
Men's swimming
Representing Great Britain
Olympic Games
Bronze medal – third place	1988 Seoul	100 m butterfly
World Championships (LC)
Bronze medal – third place	1986 Madrid	100 m butterfly
European Championships (LC)
Gold medal – first place	1987 Strasbourg	100 m butterfly
Silver medal – second place	1985 Sofia	100 m butterfly
Silver medal – second place	1987 Strasbourg	4×100 m medley
Representing England
Commonwealth Games
Gold medal – first place	1986 Edinburgh	100 m butterfly
Silver medal – second place	1986 Edinburgh	4×100 m medley
Bronze medal – third place	1986 Edinburgh	100 m freestyle
Bronze medal – third place	1986 Edinburgh	4×100 m freestyle
Summer Universiade
Gold medal – first place	1987 Zagreb	100 m freestyle
Gold medal – first place	1987 Zagreb	100 m butterfly

Andrew David Jameson (born 19 February 1965) is an English sports commentator and former competitive swimmer. Active as an elite swimmer in the mid-to-late 1980s he represented Great Britain in two consecutive Summer Olympics, the FINA World Championships, LEN European Championships, as well as England in the Commonwealth Games. At his peak between 1986 and 1988 he won the gold medal in 100 metre butterfly at the 1986 Commonwealth Games, the 1987 European Aquatics Championships and the 1987 Summer Universiade, as well as the 100 metre freestyle gold at the same Universiade. Winning the bronze medal at the 1986 World Aquatics Championships, Jameson's career in the pool culminated in winning the bronze medal in the 1988 Summer Olympics, his second and final Olympic Games.

== Profile ==
Jameson was born in Crosby, Merseyside. His swimming career was initially centred on individual medley and backstroke events, but after studying at Arizona State University, he decided to specialise in the 100-metre butterfly and 100-metre freestyle events. Initially he represented England in the backstroke events, at the 1982 Commonwealth Games in Brisbane, Queensland, Australia. He had also won the 1982 ASA National Championship title in the 200 metres backstroke.

A founder member of Kelly College Swim Squad in Tavistock (along with Sharron Davies) Jameson represented Great Britain at the 1984 Summer Olympics in Los Angeles, where he finished 5th place in the 100-metre butterfly. He then won silver in the 100-metre butterfly at the 1985 European Championships (Sofia), behind the German star swimmer Michael Gross.

Jameson took bronze in the 100-metre butterfly at the 1986 World Championships (Madrid), and then went on to take gold when representing England in the same event at the Edinburgh Commonwealth Games later that year. In addition to the gold he won a silver and bronze in the relay events and a bronze in the 100 metres freestyle. He went on to win the 1986 and 1988 ASA National Championship 100 metres butterfly titles, the 1988 ASA National Championship 100 metres freestyle title and the 200 metres backstroke title in 1982.

He won gold at the 1987 European Championships (Strasbourg) in the 100-metre butterfly, and was also part of the team which took silver in the 4×100-metre medley relay and going into the 1988 Summer Olympics in Seoul, South Korea, he was one of the pre-race favourites to win, having been undefeated for over two years in the 100-metre butterfly. He qualified fastest into the final, where he took bronze in a time of 53.30 seconds, breaking both the British and Commonwealth records in the process.

== Personal life ==
Jameson was educated at Chesterfield High School and presented prizes at the school's prize giving ceremony in December 1988.

Jameson retired from competitive swimming in 1989. He provides commentary on swimming for the BBC with fellow Olympian Adrian Moorhouse. His older sister Helen was also a competitive swimmer, and represented Britain at the 1980 Olympic Games in Moscow and won a silver medal in the 4×100-metre medley relay. His younger sister Jo was a swimmer then became a primary teacher.

He now lives in London with his wife Peggy Jameson, with whom he has two children, Maisie (1998) and Oscar (2000).

== See also ==
- List of Commonwealth Games medallists in swimming (men)
- List of Olympic medalists in swimming (men)
