= Thomas Dreßler =

East German swimmer

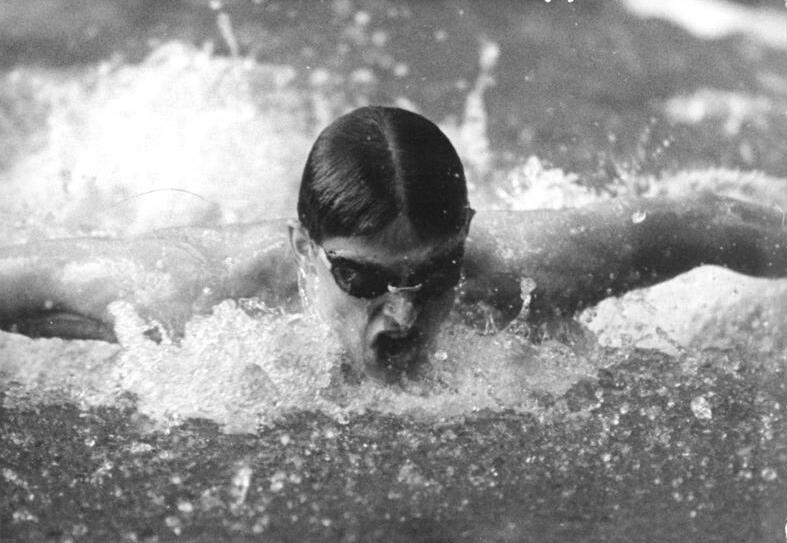
- Thomas Dreßler in 1984

Sport
- Sport: Swimming
- Club: SC DHfK Leipzig
Medal record
Representing East Germany
European Championships
Silver medal – second place	1985 Sofia	4×100 m medley
Bronze medal – third place	1987 Strasbourg	4×100 m medley

Thomas Dreßler is a retired East German swimmer who won a silver and a bronze medal in the 4×100 m medley relay at the European championships in 1985 and 1987, respectively. Between 1984 and 1988 he won ten national titles in butterfly events.
