= Mikhail Zubkov =

Personal information
- Born: 24 August 1968 (age 57) Perm, Soviet Union
- Height: 1.89 m (6 ft 2 in)
- Weight: 77 kg (170 lb)

Sport
- Sport: Swimming
- Club: Spartak (1975–1986); CSKA (1989–1993); Dynamo (1989–1993)

Mikhail Zubkov (Russian: Михаил Зубков; born 24 August 1968) is a retired Russian swimmer. He competed in the 200 m and 400 m medley events at the 1988 Summer Olympics and finished fourth and 13th, respectively.

He is married to a former Olympic swimmer Natalya Shibayeva. Their daughter Kateryna Zubkova (born 14 July 1988) is also an Olympic swimmer. Zubkov was trained by Gennadi Touretski, and after retirement became a swimming coach himself. In 2007, he was banned for six years from international swimming competitions after a fight with his daughter at the World Championships. The daughter did not blame Zubkov for the incident, and the case was dismissed by the Australian police. However, the brawl was filmed by a security camera and circulated worldwide, thereby damaging the reputation of swimming.
