= Sofia Cherveno zname swim complex =

Swimming venue in Sofia, Bulgaria

"Cherveno zname" swim complex in Sofia, Bulgaria, was the biggest swimming venue on the Balkan peninsula.

It was built in 1985 to host the European Aquatics Championships. Over the years it hosted many Bulgarian meets in swimming and synchronized swimming.

There were three indoor pools: An olympic swimming pool (50m lane), a deep pool for diving and synchronized swimming, and a children’s pool for beginners. There were also two outdoor pools: An olympic swimming pool (50 m lane), and a deep pool for diving.

It was totally renovated in 2009 at a cost of approximately €6 million.

The swim complex was closed in 2015.

Coordinates: 42°40′26″N 23°22′23″E
