= Karen König =

German swimmer

Medal record

Women's swimming

Representing East Germany

European Championships
Gold medal – first place	1985 Sofia	4×200 m freestyle
Gold medal – first place	1985 Sofia	4×100 m freestyle

Karen König (born c. 1969) is a retired German freestyle swimmer who won two gold medals at the 1985 European Aquatics Championships as part of the East Germany relay teams. She missed the 1984 Summer Olympics in Los Angeles that were boycotted by East Germany, and instead competed at the Friendship Games, where she won a gold medal in the 4 × 100 m freestyle relay, setting a new world record. She was awarded the Patriotic Order of Merit in Gold in East Germany.

Between 2003 and 2005, after the German reunification, she sued the Deutscher Olympischer Sportbund (DOSB), as the successor to the East German Olympic Committee, for 10,255 euros in the Frankfurt state court. She claimed that between 1982 and 1986 she was given performance-enhancing drugs, such as the anabolic steroid Oral Turinabol, without her knowledge and consent. The pills were said to be "vitamins". She believed that due to those pills she later developed a deep masculine voice, severe depression, hormonal imbalance and metabolic disorder. Many other East German athletes related their health disorders to the state-sponsored doping program and followed with court cases.

In 2005, the DOSB paid 193 former East German athletes 10,400 euros each; another group of 167 received 9,250 euros each by the end of February 2007. DOSB did not disclose the athlete's names, and the athlete agreed not to seek further compensation from the DOSB.

== See also ==
- Doping in East Germany
