= Jacqueline Alex =

East German swimmer (born 1965)

Personal information
- Born: 1 December 1965 (age 60) Zwickau, Germany

Sport
- Sport: Swimming
- Club: SC Turbine Erfur
Medal record
Swimming
Representing East Germany
European Championships
| Gold medal – first place | 1985 Sofia | 200 m butterfly |

Jacqueline Alex (later Kiewel, born 1 December 1965) is a retired German swimmer. In 1985 she won a national title and a European gold medal in the 200 m butterfly at the European championships.

After retiring from swimming she worked as a physiotherapist at her own company.
