= Silke Abicht =

German diver

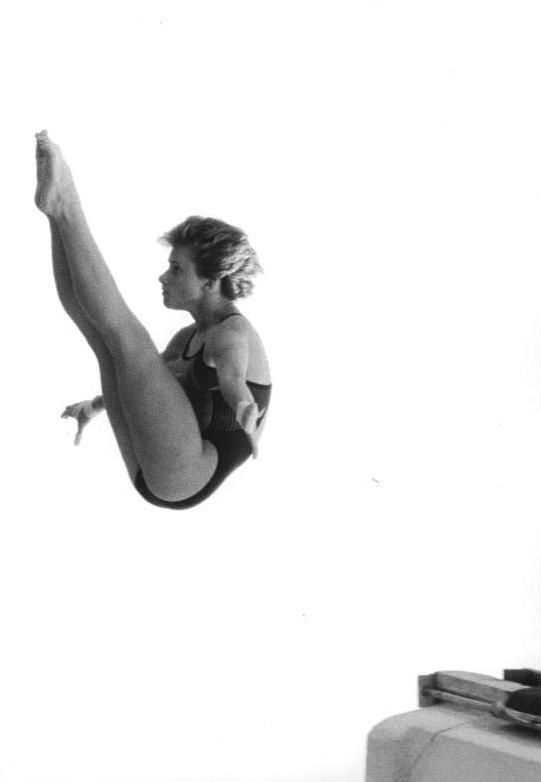
- Silke Abicht

Personal information
- Nationality: German
- Born: 7 October 1968 (age 57) Leipzig, East Germany
- Height: 1.56 m (5 ft 1 in)
- Weight: 46 kg (101 lb)

Sport
- Sport: Diving
- Club: Berliner TSC
Medal record
Women's diving
Representing East Germany
European Championships
Bronze medal – third place	1987 Strasbourg	10 m platform

Silke Abicht (born 7 October 1968) is a German diver. She competed in the 1988 Summer Olympics.
