= Heidi Eisenschmidt =

German swimmer

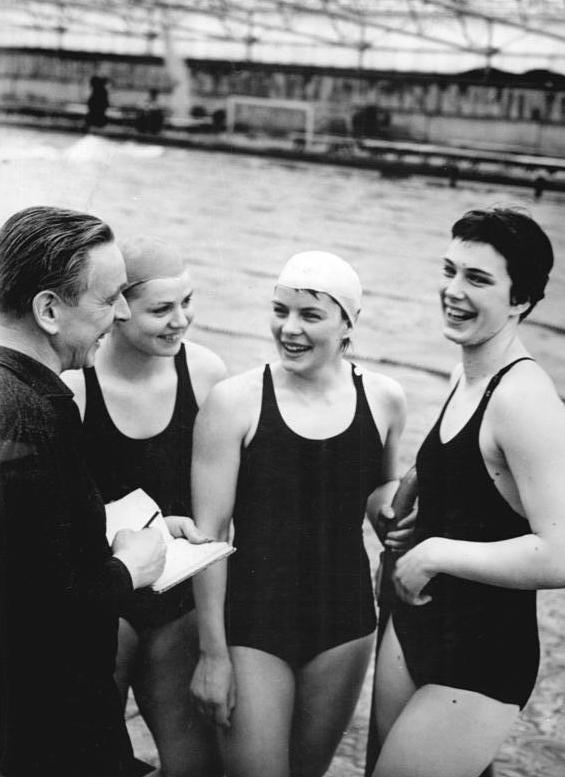
- Heidi Eisenschmidt (2nd left in 1962)

Personal information
- Born: 14 November 1941 (age 84) Gera, Germany
- Height: 1.66 m (5 ft 5 in)
- Weight: 67 kg (148 lb)

Sport
- Sport: Swimming
- Club: SC Wismut Karl-Marx-Stadt

Heidi Eisenschmidt (later Zimmermann, born 14 November 1941) is a retired German swimmer. She competed in the 100 m butterfly at the 1960 Summer Olympics, but failed to reach the final. She won three national titles between 1958 and 1960 in the discontinued event of 4 × 100 m backstroke relay.

Her daughter Kathrin Zimmermann competed in swimming at the 1988 Summer Olympics.
