= Anzhela Stasyulevich =

Soviet diver

Personal information
- Nationality: Soviet
- Born: 23 May 1967 (age 59) Minsk, Belarus

Sport
- Sport: Diving
Medal record
Women's diving
Representing the Soviet Union
European Championships
Gold medal – first place	1985 Sofia	10 m platform
Silver medal – second place	1983 Rome	10 m platform
Silver medal – second place	1987 Strasbourg	10 m platform
Universiade
Silver medal – second place	1987 Zagreb	10 m platform

Anzhela Stasyulevich (born 23 May 1967) is a Soviet diver. She competed in the women's 10 metre platform event at the 1988 Summer Olympics.
