= Olivier Fougeroud =

French swimmer

Personal information
- Born: 1965 (age 60–61) Nice, France

Sport
- Sport: Swimming

Olivier Fougeroud (born 1965) is a French swimmer. He competed in the men's 4 × 200 metre freestyle relay at the 1988 Summer Olympics.
