= 1987 European Aquatics Championships =

Water sport competitions

18th European Aquatics Championships
- Host city: Strasbourg, France
- Date: 16–23 August 1987
- Events: 41

The 1987 European Aquatics Championships, organized by the Ligue Européenne de Natation, were held in an indoor pool (50 m) in Strasbourg, France from 16 August to 23 August 1987. Besides swimming there were titles contested in diving, synchronized swimming (women) and water polo. For the first time the 50 m freestyle event was included in the tournament.

== Medal table ==
* Host nation (France)

Rank	Nation	Gold	Silver	Bronze	Total
1	East Germany	18	13	10	41
2	Soviet Union	6	9	6	21
3	West Germany	4	4	9	17
4	Hungary	3	2	1	6
5	France*	3	1	2	6
6	Romania	2	1	5	8
7	Great Britain	2	1	1	4
8	Netherlands	2	1	0	3
9	Sweden	1	0	1	2
10	Italy	0	3	2	5
11	Austria	0	2	0	2
12	Switzerland	0	1	3	4
13	Denmark	0	1	1	2
14	Belgium	0	1	0	1
14	Yugoslavia	0	1	0	1
Totals (15 entries)		41	41	41	123

== Swimming ==
=== Men's events ===
Event	Gold	Silver	Bronze
50 m freestyle	Jörg Woithe (GDR)	Gennadiy Prigoda (URS)	Stefan Volery (SUI)
100 m freestyle	Sven Lodziewski (GDR)	Stéphan Caron (FRA)	Dirk Richter (GDR)
200 m freestyle	Anders Holmertz (SWE)	Giorgio Lamberti (ITA)	Michael Groß (FRG)
400 m freestyle	Uwe Dassler (GDR)	Rainer Henkel (FRG)	Thomas Fahrner (FRG)
1500 m freestyle	Rainer Henkel (FRG)	Uwe Dassler (GDR)	Stefan Pfeiffer (FRG)
100 m backstroke	Sergei Zabolotnov (URS)	Frank Baltrusch (GDR)	Frank Hoffmeister (FRG)
200 m backstroke	Sergei Zabolotnov (URS)	Igor Polyansky (URS)	Frank Baltrusch (GDR)
100 m breaststroke	Adrian Moorhouse (GBR)	Dmitry Volkov (URS)	Gianni Minervini (ITA)
200 m breaststroke	József Szabó (HUN)	Sergey Sokolovskiy (URS)	Adrian Moorhouse (GBR)
100 m butterfly	Andy Jameson (GBR)	Michael Groß (FRG)	Benny Nielsen (DEN)
200 m butterfly	Michael Groß (FRG)	Benny Nielsen (DEN)	Vadim Yaroshchuk (URS)
200 m individual medley	Tamás Darnyi (HUN)	Vadim Yaroshchuk (URS)	Raik Hannemann (GDR)
400 m individual medley	Tamás Darnyi (HUN)	József Szabó (HUN)	Patrick Kühl (GDR)
4 × 100 m freestyle relay	East Germany; Dirk Richter; Thomas Flemming; Steffen Zesner; Sven Lodziewski	West Germany; Peter Sitt; Michael Groß; Rolf-Dieter Maltzann; Thomas Fahrner	Soviet Union; Gennadiy Prigoda; Vladimir Shemetov; Venyamin Tayanovich; Vladimir Tkacenko
4 × 200 m freestyle relay	West Germany; Peter Sitt; Rainer Henkel; Thomas Fahrner; Michael Groß	East Germany; Lars Hinneburg; Thomas Flemming; Steffen Zesner; Sven Lodziewski	Sweden; Tommy Werner; Michael Söderlund; Anders Holmertz; Markus Eriksson
4 × 100 m medley relay	Soviet Union; Igor Polyansky; Dmitry Volkov; Konstantin Petrov; Gennadiy Prigoda	Great Britain; Neil Cochran; Adrian Moorhouse; Andy Jameson; Roland Lee	East Germany; Frank Baltrusch; Christian Poswiat; Thomas Dressler; Sven Lodziewski

=== Women's events ===
Event	Gold	Silver	Bronze
50 m freestyle	Tamara Costache (ROU)	Katrin Meissner (GDR)	Christiane Pielke (FRG)
100 m freestyle	Kristin Otto (GDR)	Manuela Stellmach (GDR)	Tamara Costache (ROU)
200 m freestyle	Heike Friedrich (GDR)	Manuela Stellmach (GDR)	Luminița Dobrescu (ROU)
400 m freestyle	Heike Friedrich (GDR)	Astrid Strauss (GDR)	Stela Pura (ROU)
800 m freestyle	Anke Möhring (GDR)	Astrid Strauss (GDR)	Judith Csabai (HUN)
100 m backstroke	Kristin Otto (GDR)	Svenja Schlicht (FRG)	Kathrin Zimmermann (GDR)
200 m backstroke	Cornelia Sirch (GDR)	Kathrin Zimmermann (GDR)	Svenja Schlicht (FRG)
100 m breaststroke	Silke Hörner (GDR); 1:07.91 WR	Manuela Dalla Valle (ITA)	Sylvia Gerasch (GDR)
200 m breaststroke	Silke Hörner (GDR)	Ingrid Lempereur (BEL)	Svetlana Kuzmina (URS)
100 m butterfly	Kristin Otto (GDR)	Birte Weigang (GDR)	Catherine Plewinski (FRA)
200 m butterfly	Kathleen Nord (GDR)	Birte Weigang (GDR)	Stela Pura (ROU)
200 m individual medley	Cornelia Sirch (GDR)	Daniela Hunger (GDR)	Noemi Lung (ROU)
400 m individual medley	Noemi Lung (ROU)	Yelena Dendeberova (URS)	Kathleen Nord (GDR)
4 × 100 m freestyle relay	East Germany; Manuela Stellmach; Heike Friedrich; Kristin Otto; Katrin Meissner	Netherlands; Marianne Muis; Diana van der Plaats; Mildred Muis; Karin Brienesse	West Germany; Stephanie Bofinger; Svenja Schlicht; Christiane Pielke; Karin Seick
4 × 200 m freestyle relay	East Germany; Manuela Stellmach; Heike Friedrich; Astrid Strauss; Anke Möhring	Romania; Luminița Dobrescu; Stela Pura; Anca Patrascoiu; Noemi Lung	West Germany; Svenja Schlicht; Heike Höller; Julia Lebek; Birgit Schulz-Lohberg
4 × 100 m medley relay	East Germany; Kristin Otto; Silke Hörner; Birte Weigang; Manuela Stellmach	Italy; Lorenza Vigarani; Manuela Dalla Valle; Ilaria Tocchini; Silvia Persi	West Germany; Svenja Schlicht; Britta Dahm; Susanne Schuster; Christiane Pielke

== Diving ==
=== Men's events ===
Event	Gold	Silver	Bronze
3 m springboard	Albin Killat (FRG)	Niki Stajković (AUT)	Aleksandr Gladchenko (URS)
10 m platform	Georgiy Chogovadze (URS)	Jan Hempel (GDR)	Arsen Dzhavadian (URS)

=== Women's events ===
Event	Gold	Silver	Bronze
3 m springboard	Daphne Jongejans (NED)	Marina Babkova (URS)	Brita Baldus (GDR)
10 m platform	Yelena Miroshina (URS)	Anzhela Stasyulevich (URS)	Silke Abicht (GDR)

== Synchronized swimming ==
Event	Gold	Silver	Bronze
Solo	Muriel Hermine (FRA)	Alexandra Worisch (AUT)	Karin Singer (SUI)
Duet	Muriel Hermine and Karine Schuler (FRA)	Edith Boss and Karin Singer (SUI)	Tatyana Titova and Irina Zhukova (URS)
Team competition	France (FRA); Muriel Hermine; Karine Schuler; Anne Capron; Gaelle Quelin; Odile Petit; Marianne Aeschbacher; Catherine Hameon; Anne-Caroline Mathieu	Soviet Union (URS); Tatyana Titova; Irina Zhukova; Maria Chernyaeva; Ekaterina Lavrik; Elena Dolzhenko; Vera Artyomova; Khristina Falasinidi; Elena Foschevskaya	Switzerland (SUI); Karin Singer; Edith Boss; Claudia Muralt; Claudia Peczinka; Adriana Giovanoli; Daniela Giovanoli; Daniela Jordi; Christine Lippuner

== Water polo ==
Event	Gold	Silver	Bronze
Men's team competition	Soviet Union	Yugoslavia	Italy
Women's team competition	Netherlands	Hungary	France
