= Vadim Yaroshchuk =

Soviet swimmer (born 1966)

Personal information
- Born: April 2, 1966 (age 60)

Sport
- Sport: Swimming
Medal record
Representing the Soviet Union
Olympic Games
Bronze medal – third place	1988 Seoul	200 m medley
Bronze medal – third place	1988 Seoul	4×100 m medley
World Championships (LC)
Silver medal – second place	1986 Madrid	400 m medley
Bronze medal – third place	1986 Madrid	200 m medley
European Championships (LC)
Gold medal – first place	1989 Bonn	4×100 m medley
Silver medal – second place	1985 Sofia	400 m medley
Silver medal – second place	1987 Strasbourg	200 m medley
Bronze medal – third place	1987 Strasbourg	200 m butterfly

Vadim Yaroshchuk (Russian: Вадим Ярощук) (born April 2, 1966) is a former butterfly and medley swimmer from the Soviet Union. He won two bronze medals at the 1988 Summer Olympics in Seoul, South Korea, including for the 200m medley, for which he had placed second in the preliminary heats, and as a member of the 4×100 medley relay.

== Career ==
During his competitive swimming career, Yaroshchuk earned a reputation as one of the world's fastest butterfly swimmers, which was reflected in his commanding early lead during the butterfly leg (first 50 meters) of the 200-meter individual medley at the 1988 Olympics. Although he maintained his lead into the final 50 meters of the race, Yaroshchuk was ultimately overtaken by then-world record holder Tamás Darnyi of Hungary (Gold) and Patrick Kühl of East Germany (Silver).

Yaroshchuk won a second Bronze at the 1988 Olympics as a member of the Soviet 4x100 medley relay team, along with Igor Polyansky, Dmitry Volkov, and Gennadiy Prigoda.
