= Nadja Bergknecht =

German swimmer

Sport
- Sport: Swimming
- Club: SC Chemie Halle
Medal record
Representing East Germany
World Championships
Gold medal – first place	1986 Madrid	4×200 m freestyle

Nadja Bergknecht is a retired German swimmer who won a gold medal in the 4×200 m freestyle relay at the 1986 World Aquatics Championships, setting a new world record.
