= Benny Nielsen (swimmer) =

Danish swimmer

Medal record

Men's swimming

Representing Denmark

Olympic Games
Silver medal – second place	1988 Seoul	200 m butterfly

World Championships (LC)
Bronze medal – third place	1986 Madrid	200 m butterfly

European Championships (LC)
Silver medal – second place	1985 Sofia	200 m butterfly
Silver medal – second place	1987 Strasbourg	200 m butterfly
Bronze medal – third place	1987 Strasbourg	100 m butterfly

Benny Leo Nielsen (born 26 March 1966 in Aalborg, Nordjylland) is a former butterfly and freestyle swimmer from Denmark, who won the silver medal in the 200 m butterfly at the 1988 Summer Olympics in Seoul, South Korea.
