= Kathleen Nord =

East German swimmer (1965–2022)

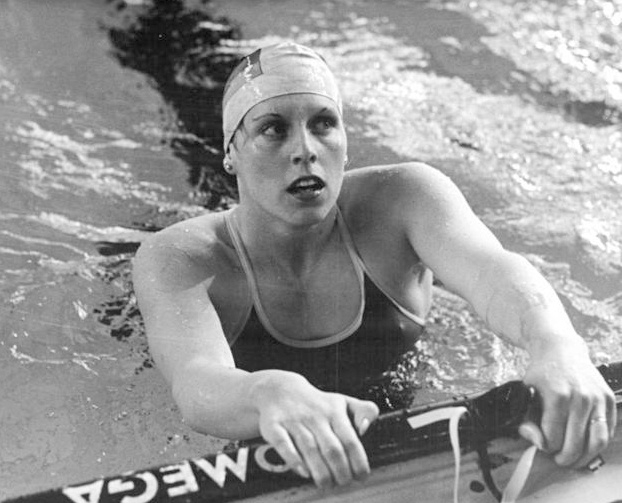
- Nord in 1987

Personal information
- Born: 26 December 1965 Magdeburg, East Germany
- Died: 24 February 2022 (aged 56) Elmshorn, Schleswig-Holstein, Germany
- Height: 1.76 m (5 ft 9 in)
- Weight: 65 kg (143 lb)

Sport
- Sport: Swimming
- Club: SC Magdeburg
Medal record
Representing East Germany
Olympic Games
Gold medal – first place	1988 Seoul	200 m butterfly
World Championships
Gold medal – first place	1986 Madrid	400 m medley
Silver medal – second place	1982 Guayaquil	400 m medley
Bronze medal – third place	1986 Madrid	200 m medley
European Championships
Gold medal – first place	1983 Rome	400 m medley
Gold medal – first place	1985 Sofia	200 m medley
Gold medal – first place	1985 Sofia	400 m medley
Gold medal – first place	1987 Strasbourg	200 m butterfly
Gold medal – first place	1989 Bonn	200 m butterfly
Silver medal – second place	1983 Rome	200 m medley
Bronze medal – third place	1987 Strasbourg	400 m medley
Bronze medal – third place	1989 Bonn	100 m butterfly

Kathleen Nord (later Schwartz and Feldvoss, 26 December 1965 – 24 February 2022) was a butterfly and medley swimmer from East Germany. She won the gold medal in the 200 m butterfly at the 1988 Summer Olympics and finished fifth in the 400 m individual medley. Between 1982 and 1989 she won six gold, two silver and three bronze medals in individual medley and butterfly events at European and world championships. She missed the 1984 Summer Olympics due to their boycott by East Germany and competed at the Friendship Games instead, winning a silver medal in the 400 m individual medley.

She started swimming aged six, had her first international competition at age 13, her first medal at world championships at 16, and retired at 25 in 1990, though she briefly resumed competing in 1995–1996 in the United States.

In the early 1990s she studied law at university, but when the courses were halted in 1992 as a result of the unification of East and West Germany she went to the Palm Beach Community College in Florida. Nord married mathematics professor and former competitive swimmer Jörg Feldvoss, and had four daughters. In 2013, she returned to her hometown of Magdeburg. She worked as a swimming coach.

Nord died on 24 February 2022, at the age of 56, from the results of an illness.

== See also ==
- List of World Aquatics Championships medalists in swimming (women)
