= Nikolay Yevseyev =

Russian former freestyle swimmer (born 1966)

Personal information
- Born: 16 April 1966 (age 60)
- Height: 1.90 m (6 ft 3 in)
- Weight: 81 kg (179 lb)

Sport
- Sport: Swimming
- Club: SKA St. Petersburg
Medal record
Olympic Games
Representing the Soviet Union
Silver medal – second place	1988 Seoul	4×100 m freestyle relay
Bronze medal – third place	1988 Seoul	4×100 m medley relay
World Championships
Silver medal – second place	1986 Madrid	4×100 m freestyle
Bronze medal – third place	1986 Madrid	4×100 m medley

Nikolay Sergeyevich Yevseyev (Russian: Николай Серге́евич Евсеев; born 16 April 1966) is a Russian former freestyle swimmer. He won a silver and a bronze medal in 4 × 100 m relays at the 1986 World Aquatics Championships. Two years later, he competed at the 1988 Summer Olympics in three relays and won a silver and a bronze medal. In the 4 × 100 m medley relay he swam only in the preliminary round, whereas his team was disqualified in the 4 × 200 m freestyle relay.

He graduated from the Lesgaft University of Physical Education in Saint Petersburg, where he was coached by Gennadi Touretski. In 1994, he moved to Germany where he works as a swimming coach. He married Angela Maurer, a German Olympic marathon swimmer and his trainee. They have a son, Maxim, born ca. 2005.
