= Astrid Strauss =

East German swimmer

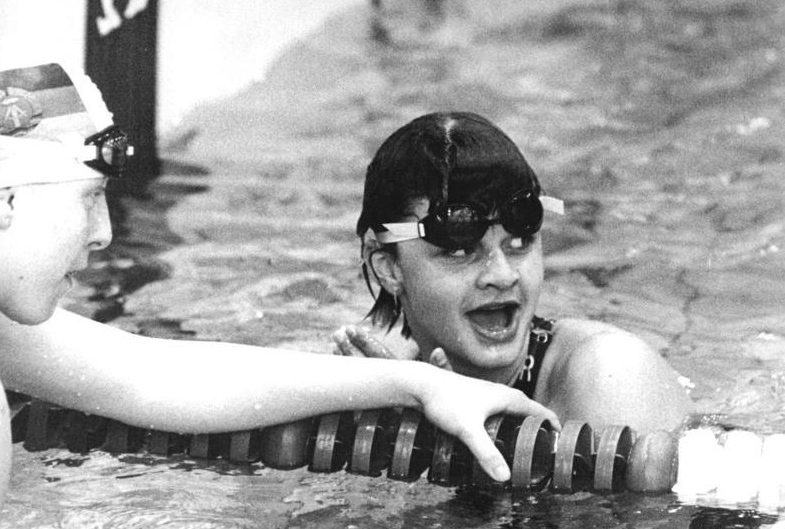
- Astrid Strauss in 1983

Personal information
- Nationality: East German
- Born: 24 December 1968 (age 57) East Berlin, East Germany
- Height: 1.87 m (6 ft 2 in)
- Weight: 82 kg (181 lb)

Sport
- Sport: Swimming
- Strokes: Freestyle
- Club: Berliner TSC
Medal record
Women's swimming
Representing East Germany
Olympic Games
Silver medal – second place	1988 Seoul	800 m freestyle
World Championships (LC)
Gold medal – first place	1986 Madrid	800 m freestyle
Gold medal – first place	1986 Madrid	4×200 m freestyle
Silver medal – second place	1986 Madrid	400 m freestyle
European Championships (LC)
Gold medal – first place	1983 Rome	400 m freestyle
Gold medal – first place	1983 Rome	800 m freestyle
Gold medal – first place	1983 Rome	4×200 m freestyle
Gold medal – first place	1985 Sofia	400 m freestyle
Gold medal – first place	1985 Sofia	800 m freestyle
Gold medal – first place	1985 Sofia	4×100 m freestyle
Gold medal – first place	1985 Sofia	4×200 m freestyle
Gold medal – first place	1987 Strasbourg	4×200 m freestyle
Gold medal – first place	1989 Bonn	4×200 m freestyle
Silver medal – second place	1983 Rome	200 m freestyle
Silver medal – second place	1987 Strasbourg	400 m freestyle
Silver medal – second place	1987 Strasbourg	800 m freestyle
Silver medal – second place	1989 Bonn	800 m freestyle

Astrid Strauss or, rarely, Strauß (born 24 December 1968 in Berlin) is a former freestyle swimmer from East Germany, who won the silver medal in the 800 m freestyle at the 1988 Summer Olympics in Seoul, South Korea.

In May 1992, she tested positive for testosterone and was suspended from competition.

== See also ==
- List of German records in swimming
