= Manuela Stellmach =

German swimmer (born 1970)

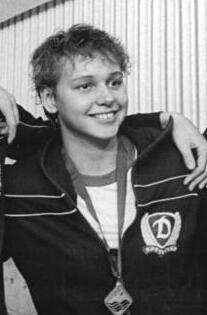
- Stellmach at the 1987 East German Swimming Championships in Erfurt

Personal information
- Nationality: East Germany (until 1990); Germany
- Born: 22 February 1970 (age 56) East Berlin, East Germany
- Height: 1.75 m (5 ft 9 in)
- Weight: 65 kg (143 lb)

Sport
- Sport: Swimming
- Strokes: Freestyle
- Club: SC Dynamo Berlin; SV Preußen Berlin
Medal record
Women's swimming
Representing East Germany
Olympic Games
Gold medal – first place	1988 Seoul	4×100 m freestyle
Bronze medal – third place	1988 Seoul	200 m freestyle
Representing Germany
Bronze medal – third place	1992 Barcelona	4×100 m freestyle
World Championships (LC)
Representing East Germany
Gold medal – first place	1986 Madrid	4×100 m freestyle
Gold medal – first place	1986 Madrid	4×200 m freestyle
Silver medal – second place	1986 Madrid	200 m freestyle
Representing Germany
Gold medal – first place	1991 Perth	4x200 m freestyle
Silver medal – second place	1991 Perth	4×100 m freestyle
Bronze medal – third place	1991 Perth	4x100 m medley
European Championships (LC)
Representing East Germany
Gold medal – first place	1985 Sofia	4×100 m freestyle
Gold medal – first place	1985 Sofia	4×200 m freestyle
Gold medal – first place	1987 Strasbourg	4×100 m freestyle
Gold medal – first place	1987 Strasbourg	4×200 m freestyle
Gold medal – first place	1987 Strasbourg	4×100 m medley
Gold medal – first place	1989 Bonn	200 m freestyle
Gold medal – first place	1989 Bonn	4×100 m freestyle
Gold medal – first place	1989 Bonn	4×200 m freestyle
Silver medal – second place	1985 Sofia	100 m freestyle
Silver medal – second place	1985 Sofia	200 m freestyle
Silver medal – second place	1987 Strasbourg	100 m freestyle
Silver medal – second place	1987 Strasbourg	200 m freestyle
Silver medal – second place	1989 Bonn	100 m freestyle
Representing Germany
Gold medal – first place	1993 Sheffield	4×100 m freestyle
Gold medal – first place	1993 Sheffield	4×200 m freestyle
Silver medal – second place	1991 Athens	4×200 m freestyle

Manuela Stellmach (born 22 February 1970 in Berlin) is a former freestyle swimmer from East Germany, who was a member of the women's relay team that won the gold medal in the 4×100 m freestyle relay at the 1988 Summer Olympics in Seoul, South Korea. At the same tournament she captured the bronze medal in the individual 200 m freestyle. Four years later, when Barcelona, Spain hosted the Summer Olympics, Stellmach ended up third (bronze) with the women's relay team from the Unified Germany.
