= Heike Friedrich =

East German swimmer (born 1970)

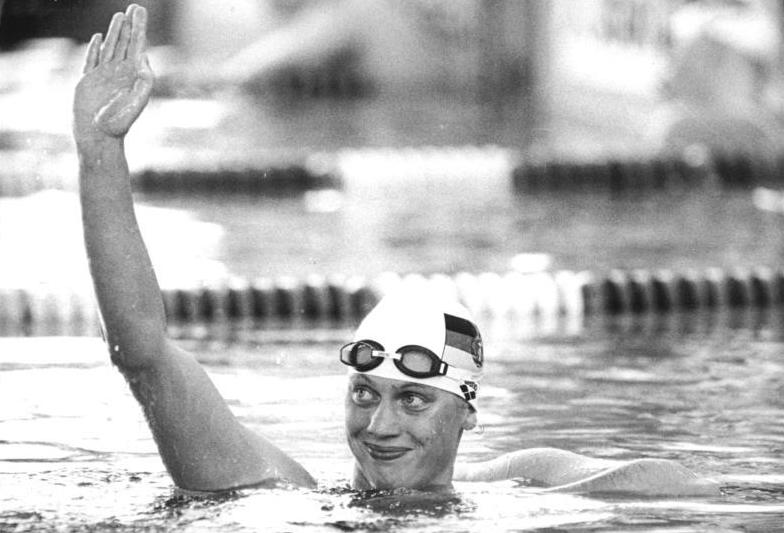
- Friedrich in 1988

Personal information
- Nationality: East German
- Born: 18 April 1970 (age 56) Karl-Marx-Stadt, East Germany
- Height: 1.73 m (5 ft 8 in)
- Weight: 63 kg (139 lb)

Sport
- Sport: Swimming
- Strokes: Freestyle
- Club: SC Karl-Marx-Stadt
Medal record
Women's swimming
Representing East Germany
Olympic Games
Gold medal – first place	1988 Seoul	200 m freestyle
Gold medal – first place	1988 Seoul	4×100 m freestyle
Silver medal – second place	1988 Seoul	400 m freestyle
World Championships – Long Course
Gold medal – first place	1986 Madrid	200 m freestyle
Gold medal – first place	1986 Madrid	400 m freestyle
Gold medal – first place	1986 Madrid	4×100 m freestyle
Gold medal – first place	1986 Madrid	4×200 m freestyle
European Championships (LC)
Representing East Germany
Gold medal – first place	1985 Sofia	100 m freestyle
Gold medal – first place	1985 Sofia	200 m freestyle
Gold medal – first place	1985 Sofia	4×100 m freestyle
Gold medal – first place	1985 Sofia	4×200 m freestyle
Gold medal – first place	1985 Sofia	4×100 m medley
Gold medal – first place	1987 Strasbourg	200 m freestyle
Gold medal – first place	1987 Strasbourg	400 m freestyle
Gold medal – first place	1987 Strasbourg	4×100 m freestyle
Gold medal – first place	1987 Strasbourg	4×200 m freestyle
Gold medal – first place	1989 Bonn	4×100 m freestyle
Gold medal – first place	1989 Bonn	4×200 m freestyle
Silver medal – second place	1989 Bonn	400 m freestyle
Representing Germany
Silver medal – second place	1991 Athens	4×200 m freestyle

Heike Friedrich (born 18 April 1970 in Karl-Marx-Stadt, Saxony) is a former freestyle swimmer from East Germany, who won two medals at the 1988 Summer Olympics in Seoul, South Korea.

At the age of 15, Friedrich won five gold medals in the 1985 European championships and won four more in the World Championship the next year. She had not lost in a single major international championship in any event until she was defeated by Janet Evans in the 400 m in the Seoul Olympics, taking the silver medal. Friedrich had already won the gold medal in the 200 m freestyle on the previous day.

In October 1986, she was awarded a Star of People's Friendship in gold (second class) for her sporting success.

Records
Preceded by Kristin Otto	Women's 200 metre freestyle world record holder (long course); 18 June 1986 – 6 September 1994	Succeeded by Franziska van Almsick
