= Noemi Lung =

Romanian swimmer

Noémi Lung
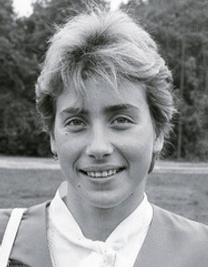
- Noemi Lung in 1988

Personal information
- Full name: Noemi Lung Zaharia
- Nationality: Romanian
- Born: May 16, 1968 (age 58) Baia Mare, Romania
- Height: 1.75 m (5 ft 9 in)
- Weight: 65 kg (143 lb)

Sport
- Sport: Swimming
- Strokes: Butterfly and medley
- College team: Florida Atlantic University (USA)
- Coach: Gheorghe Demeca
Medal record
Representing Romania
Olympic Games
| Silver medal – second place | 1988 Seoul | 400 m medley |
| Bronze medal – third place | 1988 Seoul | 200 m medley |
World Championships (LC)
| Bronze medal – third place | 1986 Madrid | 400 m medley |
European Championships (LC)
| Gold medal – first place | 1987 Strasbourg | 400 m medley |
| Silver medal – second place | 1987 Strasbourg | 4×200 m freestyle |
| Bronze medal – third place | 1987 Strasbourg | 200 m medley |
Summer Universiade
| Gold medal – first place | 1987 Zagreb | 200 m freestyle |
| Gold medal – first place | 1987 Zagreb | 400 m freestyle |
| Gold medal – first place | 1987 Zagreb | 800 m freestyle |
| Gold medal – first place | 1987 Zagreb | 200 m medley |
| Gold medal – first place | 1987 Zagreb | 400 m medley |
| Bronze medal – third place | 1987 Zagreb | 200 m butterfly |

Noemi Lung Zaharia (born May 16, 1968) is a retired butterfly, freestyle and medley swimmer from Romania, who won two individual medley medals at the 1988 Olympics. A year before she collected a record five gold medals at the 1987 Summer Universiade in Zagreb.

In 1990 she moved to the United States, where she received a scholarship in 1995 and graduated in management from the Florida International University in Miami. She was women's swimming head coach at the Florida University from 2002 to 2010. In 2020, she received a PhD in sports leadership from the United States Sports Academy. Since 2010 she is the director of the Aquatic and Fitness Center at Miami Dade College North campus in Miami, Florida, before becoming an assistant professor at the University of Alabama Huntsville. In 2024, Dr. Noemi Zaharia became the director of sport leadership and an associate professor at the United States Sport's Academy.

Since December 1995 she is married to the Olympic handball player Cristian Zaharia. They have two children.
