= Donald Haddow =

Canadian swimmer

Personal information
- Full name: Donald Haddow
- National team: Canada
- Born: January 19, 1970 (age 56) Mississauga, Ontario
- Height: 1.70 m (5 ft 7 in)
- Weight: 65 kg (143 lb)

Sport
- Sport: Swimming
- Strokes: Freestyle
- Club: Etobicoke Swim Club

Donald Haddow (born January 19, 1970) is a competitive freestyle swimmer from Canada, who was a member of the men's 4x200-metre freestyle relay team that finished in eighth position at the 1988 Summer Olympics in Seoul, South Korea.
