= Rolf Beab =

German swimmer (born 1964)

Personal information
- Born: 4 January 1964 (age 62) Helmstedt, West Germany

Sport
- Sport: Swimming
- Club: TSV Bayer Dormagen
Medal record
Swimming
Representing West Germany
European Championships
Gold medal – first place	1985 Sofia	4×100 m medley
Silver medal – second place	1985 Sofia	100 m breaststroke

Rolf Beab (born 4 January 1964) is a retired German breaststroke swimmer who won one gold and one silver medal at the 1985 European Aquatics Championships. Between 1985 and 1988 he won four national titles in the 50 m and 100 m breaststroke events.

He is married to Susan; they have a son, Denis (b. 1984). He is an IT entrepreneur and lives in Dormagen
