= Alexander Schowtka =

German swimmer

Personal information
- Born: 18 September 1963 (age 62) Valencia, Venezuela
Medal record
Men's Swimming
Representing West Germany
Olympic Games
Silver medal – second place	1984 Los Angeles	4x200 m freestyle relay
World Championships
Silver medal – second place	1986 Madrid	4x200m freestyle relay
Silver medal – second place	1986 Madrid	4x100m medley relay
European Championships
Gold medal – first place	1983 Rome	4x200m freestyle relay
Gold medal – first place	1985 Sofia	4x100m freestyle relay
Gold medal – first place	1985 Sofia	4x200m freestyle relay
Gold medal – first place	1985 Sofia	4x100m medley relay

Alexander Schowtka (born 18 September 1963) is a German former swimmer who competed in the 1984 Summer Olympics.
