= Paul Wallace (swimmer) =

American swimmer

Sport
- Sport: Swimming
Medal record
Representing United States
World Aquatics Championships
Gold medal – first place	1986 Madrid	4x100m freestyle relay
Pan American Games
Silver medal – second place	1987 Indianapolis	200m individual medley
Pan Pacific Championships
Gold medal – first place	1985 Tokyo	4x100m freestyle relay

Paul Wallace is an international swimmer who represented United States during the World Championships in the year 1986. He also won the first prize in Men's 4*100 m freestyle. Paul along with his other companions set a new World record of 3 min 17.08 seconds in 4*100 m relay. He also qualified Nationals swimming qualifier 2003 (50-meter free), USA. He became a member of the USA Swimming Task force.
