= Bert Göbel =

German swimmer

Sport
- Sport: Swimming
Medal record
Representing West Germany
World Championships
Silver medal – second place	1986 Madrid	4×100 m medley

Bert Göbel (also Goebel) (born 14 July 1963 in Mönchengladbach) is a retired German swimmer who won a silver medal in the 4 × 100 m medley relay at the 1986 World Aquatics Championships. He also won national championships in the 100 m breaststroke events in 1986 and 1987.
