= Natalya Shibayeva =

Ukrainian swimmer

Personal information
- Born: 28 July 1968 (age 57) Kharkiv, Ukrainian SSR, Soviet Union

Sport
- Sport: Swimming
Medal record
Representing Soviet Union
World Championships
Bronze medal – third place	1986 Madrid	100 m backstroke
European Championships
Silver medal – second place	1985 Sofia	4×100 m medley
Bronze medal – third place	1985 Sofia	100 m backstroke

Natalya Vladimirovna Shibayeva (Russian: Наталья Владимировна Шибаева, Ukrainian: Наталія Володимирівна Шибаєва; born 28 July 1968) is a retired Ukrainian swimmer. She won three medals for the Soviet Union at the 1986 World Aquatics Championships and 1985 European Aquatics Championships. She also competed in the 100 m and 200 m backstroke events at the 1992 Summer Olympics for the Unified Team, but did not reach the finals.

She retired from swimming in 1992 and in 1993 graduated from the University of Kharkiv with a degree in history. In 2002, she defended her PhD and then worked as assistant professor in economics at the same university.

She is married to a former Olympic swimmer and coach Mikhail Zubkov. Their daughter Kateryna Zubkova (born 14 July 1988) is also an Olympic swimmer.
