= Claus Christensen =

Danish swimmer

Personal information
- Born: 5 February 1968 (age 58) Odense, Denmark

Sport
- Sport: Swimming

Claus Christensen (born 5 February 1968) is a Danish freestyle swimmer. He competed in two events at the 1988 Summer Olympics.
