= Kathrin Zimmermann =

East German swimmer

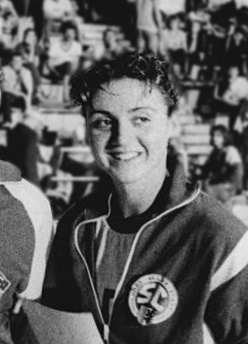
- Kathrin Zimmermann in 1986

Personal information
- Born: 22 December 1966 (age 59) Gera, Bezirk Gera, East Germany
- Height: 1.73 m (5 ft 8 in)
- Weight: 65 kg (143 lb)

Sport
- Sport: Swimming
- Club: SC Karl-Marx-Stadt
Medal record
Representing East Germany
Olympic Games
| Silver medal – second place | 1988 Seoul | 200 m backstroke |
World Championships
| Gold medal – first place | 1986 Madrid | 4×100 m medley |
| Silver medal – second place | 1986 Madrid | 100 m backstroke |
| Bronze medal – third place | 1986 Madrid | 200 m backstroke |
European Championships
| Silver medal – second place | 1983 Rome | 200 m backstroke |
| Silver medal – second place | 1985 Sofia | 100 m backstroke |
| Silver medal – second place | 1985 Sofia | 200 m backstroke |
| Silver medal – second place | 1987 Strasbourg | 200 m backstroke |
| Bronze medal – third place | 1987 Strasbourg | 100 m backstroke |

Kathrin Zimmermann (born 22 December 1966 in Gera) is a former backstroke swimmer from East Germany who won a silver medal in the 200 m backstroke at the 1988 Summer Olympics. Earlier, between 1983 and 1987 she won five silver and two bronze medals at European and world championships in the 100 m and 200 m backstroke events, as well as one world title in the 4 × 100 m medley relay.

Her mother Heidi Eisenschmidt competed in swimming at the 1960 Summer Olympics.
