= Uwe Dassler =

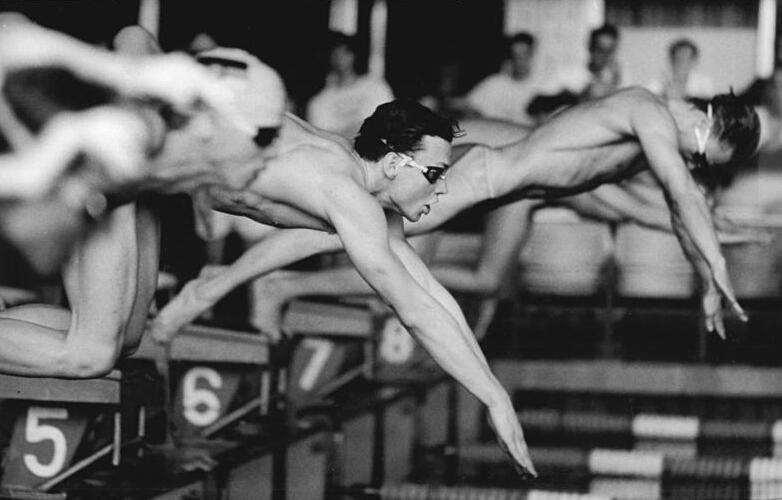
- Uwe Dassler in 1986

Personal information
- Full name: Uwe Dassler; Uwe Daßler (German)
- Nationality: East Germany (formerly); Germany
- Born: 11 February 1967 (age 59) Ebersbach, Saxony, East Germany
- Height: 1.93 m (6 ft 4 in)
- Weight: 87 kg (192 lb)

Sport
- Sport: Swimming
- Strokes: Freestyle
- Club: ASK Vorwärts Potsdam
Medal record
Men's swimming
Representing East Germany
Olympic Games
| Gold medal – first place | 1988 Seoul | 400 m freestyle |
| Silver medal – second place | 1988 Seoul | 4×200 m freestyle |
| Bronze medal – third place | 1988 Seoul | 1500 m freestyle |
World Championships (LC)
| Silver medal – second place | 1986 Madrid | 400 m freestyle |
European Championships (LC)
| Gold medal – first place | 1985 Sofia | 400 m freestyle |
| Gold medal – first place | 1985 Sofia | 1500 m freestyle |
| Gold medal – first place | 1987 Strasbourg | 400 m freestyle |
| Silver medal – second place | 1987 Strasbourg | 1500 m freestyle |
| Bronze medal – third place | 1989 Bonn | 4×200 m freestyle |
Friendship Games
| Silver medal – second place | 1984 Moscow | 1500 m freestyle |
Representing Germany
| Bronze medal – third place | 1991 Athens | 4×200 m freestyle |

Uwe Daßler (born 11 February 1967), commonly spelled Uwe Dassler in English, is a former middle- and long-distance swimmer from Germany, who represented East Germany (GDR) in international competition.

He was European champion in the 400-metre freestyle in 1985 and 1987.

At the 1988 Summer Olympics in Seoul, South Korea, Dassler won three medals. He won a gold medal and set a new world record of 3:46.95 in the men's 400-metre freestyle. He then won a bronze for his third-place finish in the men's 1,500-metre freestyle (15:06.15), behind Soviet Vladimir Salnikov (15:00.40) and West German Stefan Pfeiffer (15:02.69). He also won a silver medal as a member of the second-place East German team in silver men's 4×200-metre freestyle relay (7:13.60).

== See also ==
- German records in swimming
- Swimming at the 1988 Summer Olympics
- World record progression 400 metres freestyle

Records
| Preceded by Artur Wojdat | Men's 400 metres freestyle world record holder (long course); 23 September 1988 – 3 April 1992 | Succeeded by Kieren Perkins |
