= Deborah Babashoff =

American swimmer (born 1970)

Personal information
- Full name: Deborah Babashoff
- Nickname: "Debbie"
- National team: United States
- Born: 1970 (age 55–56) Whittier, California

Sport
- Sport: Swimming
- Strokes: Freestyle
- Club: Mission Viejo Nadadores
- College team: University of Miami
Medal record
Women's swimming
Representing United States
World Championships
Bronze medal – third place	1986 Madrid	800 m freestyle
Pan American Games
Silver medal – second place	1987 Indianapolis	800 m freestyle

Deborah Babashoff (born 1970) is an American former competition swimmer who excelled in freestyle distance events.

Babashoff won her first national title in the 500 freestyle at the Short Course Nationals, in March, 1985. Showing consistency at longer distances, she placed third in the 1500m-eter freestyle with a time of 16:48.37 at the Speedo Swim Meet of Champions at Mission Viejo on June 23, 1985. Her 4x100 Freestyle Relay team composed of the Mission Viejo Nadadores, also took first place.

== 1986 World Aquatics Championships ==
On June 24, 1986, she qualified for that years World Aquatics Championships which was to be held in Madrid by winning the 400-meter freestyle at the World Aquatics Trials in Orlando, Florida, with a personal best time of 4:09.97. At the time, she was training with the Mission Viejo Nadadores. Later, in Madrid, she won the bronze medal in the 800-meter freestyle event at the World Championships.

== 1987 Pan American Games ==
Next year she won a silver medal at the 1987 Pan American Games in the same event, and in 1989 a national title in the 1500-meter freestyle.

In 1988, she took second behind Janet Evans in the 1500 freestyle at the U.S. Indoor Championships at Orlando, Florida with a time of 16:27.40.3.

=== Family and coaches ===
Debbie was born to Vera and Jack Babashoff in Whittier, California. Her father had been a swimming instructor in Hawaii and always wanted his own children to become Olympians. Both of her parents are second-generation Spiritual Christians from Russia. She attended Fountain Valley High School near Huntington Beach, California. Prior to college, she was coached by Flip Dar with the Irvine Novaquatics which she switched to around June 1987. She had previously swum for the Mission Viejo Nadadores under head coach Mark Schubert, but moved to the Novaquatics to improve her times. While swimming at the meet to qualify for the Olympic Trials in 1986, Deborah qualified in the 400 and 800 freestyle when she was a High School Senior. At the trials in Austin in August 1988, she did not qualify for the final heat to make the U.S. Olympic Team.

=== Training schedule ===
In 1988, her demanding workout schedule consisted of weight training three days a week, five hours of training on Saturdays, and two workouts every weekday, with one before and one after school. In that year, she had been voted Most Valuable Swimmer in the Sunset League three years in a row, and won Fountain Valley High School's Athletic Coronet Award, the school's highest recognition for service or achievement.

Her older sister Shirley (b. 1957) and older brothers Jack, Jr., (b. 1955) and Bill (b. 1959) were also swimmers who competed internationally.
