= József Szabó =

Hungarian swimmer (born 1969)

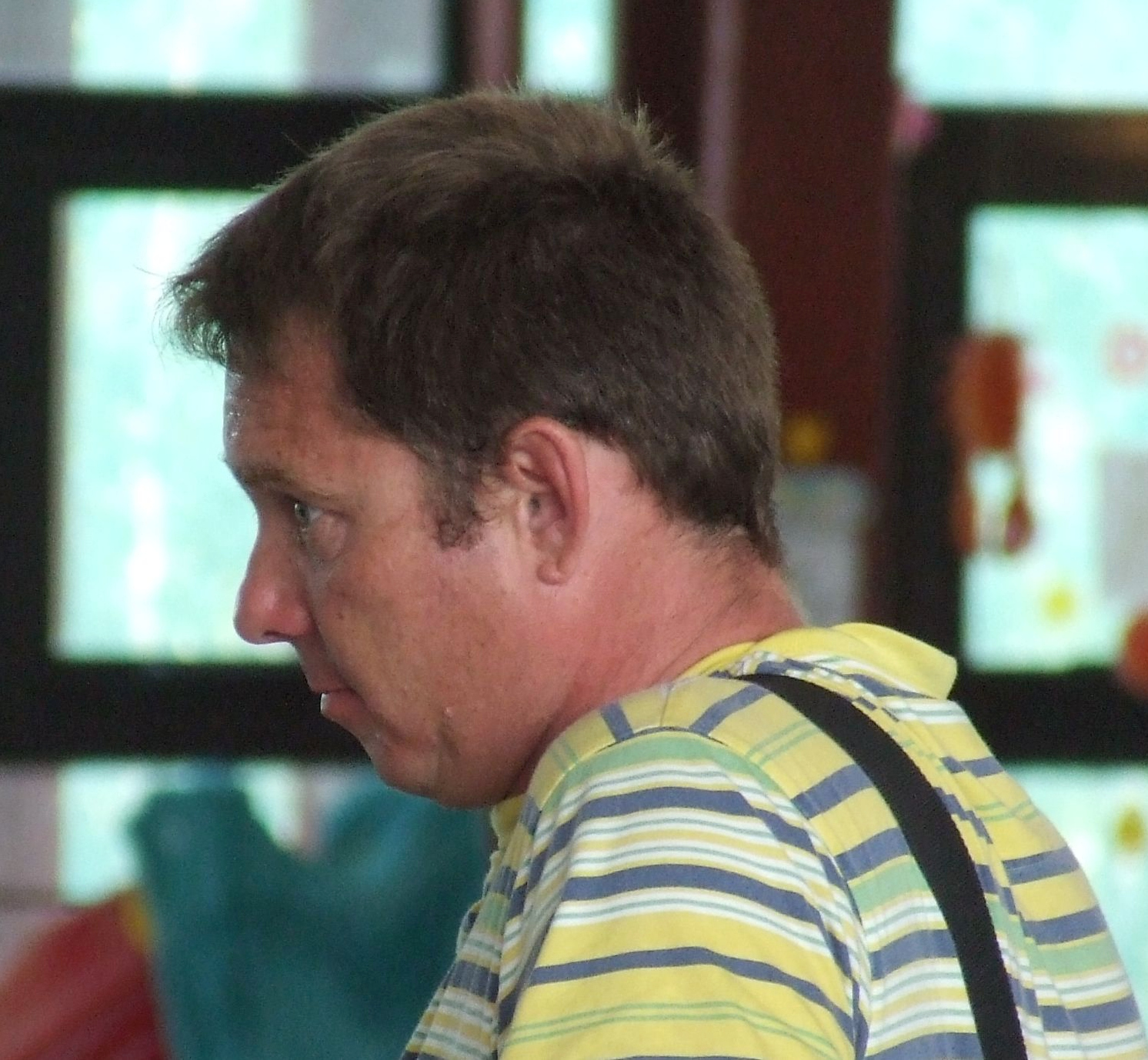
- Szabó in 2008

Personal information
- Full name: Szabó József
- Nationality: Hungarian
- Born: 10 March 1969 (age 57) Budapest, Hungary
- Height: 1.86 m (6 ft 1 in)
- Weight: 83 kg (183 lb)

Sport
- Sport: Swimming
- Strokes: Breaststroke, medley
- Club: Budapesti Honvéd Sportegyesület
- Coach: Tamás Széchy
Medal record
Representing Hungary
Olympic Games
Gold medal – first place	1988 Seoul	200 m breaststroke
World Championships (LC)
Gold medal – first place	1986 Madrid	200 m breaststroke
European Championships (LC)
Gold medal – first place	1987 Strasbourg	200 m breaststroke
Silver medal – second place	1987 Strasbourg	400 m medley
Bronze medal – third place	1989 Bonn	200 m breaststroke

József Szabó (born 10 March 1969) is a retired Hungarian swimmer. He competed in three individual events at the 1988 Olympics and won a gold medal in the 200 m breaststroke; he placed fourth in the 400 m and 24th in the 200 m medley events. Between 1986 and 1989 he won two gold, one silver and one bronze medals in those three events at the world and European championships. In 2012 he was inducted into the International Swimming Hall of Fame.

== See also ==
- List of members of the International Swimming Hall of Fame
