= 1986 World Aquatics Championships =

Aquatic sports competition

5th FINA World Championships
- Host city: Madrid, Spain
- Date: August 13–23, 1986
- Opened by: Juan Carlos I

The 1986 World Aquatics Championships took place in M86 Swimming Center in Madrid, Spain between August 13 and August 23, 1986, with 1119 participating athletes. In swimming, the 50 m freestyle events and women's 4 × 200 m freestyle relay were held for the first time.

== Medal table ==
Place	Nation	1st place, gold medalist(s)	2nd place, silver medalist(s)	3rd place, bronze medalist(s)	Total
1	East Germany	14	12	4	30
2	United States	9	10	13	32
3	Canada	4	2	2	8
4	West Germany	4	2	1	7
5	Hungary	3	0	0	3
6	China	2	4	1	7
7	Soviet Union	2	3	7	12
8	Romania	1	0	1	2
9	Australia	1	0	0	1
9	Yugoslavia	1	0	0	1
11	Italy	0	3	0	3
12	Netherlands	0	1	4	5
13	Bulgaria	0	1	1	2
13	France	0	1	1	2
13	Switzerland	0	1	1	2
16	New Zealand	0	1	0	1
17	Great Britain	0	0	2	2
17	Japan	0	0	2	2
19	Denmark	0	0	1	1
Total		41	41	41	123

== Medal summary ==
=== Diving ===
Men

Event	Gold	Silver	Bronze
3 m springboard	Greg Louganis (USA)	Tan Liangde (CHN)	Li Hongping (CHN)
10 m highboard	Greg Louganis (USA)	Li Kongzheng (CHN)	Bruce Kimball (USA)

Women

Event	Gold	Silver	Bronze
3 m springboard	Gao Min (CHN)	Li Yihua (CHN)	Marina Babkova (URS)
10 m highboard	Chen Lin (CHN)	Lü Wei (CHN)	Wendy Wyland (USA)

=== Swimming ===
Men

Event	Gold	Silver	Bronze
50 m freestyle	Tom Jager (USA)	Dano Halsall (SUI)	Matt Biondi (USA)
100 m freestyle	Matt Biondi (USA)	Stéphan Caron (FRA)	Tom Jager (USA)
200 m freestyle	Michael Gross (FRG)	Sven Lodziewski (GDR)	Matt Biondi (USA)
400 m freestyle	Rainer Henkel (FRG)	Uwe Daßler (GDR)	Dan Jorgensen (USA)
1500 m freestyle	Rainer Henkel (FRG)	Stefano Battistelli (ITA)	Dan Jorgensen (USA)
100 m backstroke	Igor Polyansky (URS)	Dirk Richter (GDR)	Sergei Zabolotnov (URS)
200 m backstroke	Igor Polyansky (URS)	Frank Baltrusch (GDR)	Frank Hoffmeister (FRG)
100 m breaststroke	Victor Davis (CAN)	Gianni Minervini (ITA)	Dmitry Volkov (URS)
200 m breaststroke	József Szabó (HUN)	Victor Davis (CAN)	Steve Bentley (USA)
100 m butterfly	Pablo Morales (USA)	Matt Biondi (USA)	Andy Jameson (GBR)
200 m butterfly	Michael Gross (FRG)	Anthony Mosse (NZL)	Benny Nielsen (DEN)
200 m individual medley	Tamás Darnyi (HUN)	Alex Baumann (CAN)	Vadim Yaroshchuk (URS)
400 m individual medley	Tamás Darnyi (HUN)	Vadim Yaroshchuk (URS)	Alex Baumann (CAN)
4 × 100 m freestyle relay	United States (USA); Tom Jager; Mike Heath; Paul Wallace; Matt Biondi	Soviet Union (URS); Gennadiy Prigoda; Nikolay Yevseyev; Sergey Smiriyagin; Aleksey Markovsky	East Germany (GDR); Dirk Richter; Jörg Woithe; Sven Lodziewski; Steffen Zesner
4 × 200 m freestyle relay	East Germany (GDR); Lars Hinneburg; Thomas Flemming; Dirk Richter; Sven Lodziewski	West Germany (FRG); Rainer Henkel; Michael Gross; Alexander Schowtka; Thomas Fahrner	United States (USA); Eric Boyer; Mike Heath; Dan Jorgensen; Matt Biondi
4 × 100 m medley relay	United States (USA); Dan Veatch; David Lundberg; Pablo Morales; Matt Biondi	West Germany (FRG); Frank Hoffmeister; Bert Göbel; Michael Gross; André Schadt	Soviet Union (URS); Igor Polyansky; Dmitry Volkov; Aleksey Markovsky; Nikolay Yevseyev

Women

Event	Gold	Silver	Bronze
50 m freestyle	Tamara Costache (ROU)	Kristin Otto (GDR)	Marie-Thérèse Armentero (SUI)
100 m freestyle	Kristin Otto (GDR)	Jenna Johnson (USA)	Conny van Bentum (NED)
200 m freestyle	Heike Friedrich (GDR)	Manuela Stellmach (GDR)	Mary T. Meagher (USA)
400 m freestyle	Heike Friedrich (GDR)	Astrid Strauß (GDR)	Sarah Hardcastle (GBR)
800 m freestyle	Astrid Strauß (GDR)	Katja Hartmann (GDR)	Debbie Babashoff (USA)
100 m backstroke	Betsy Mitchell (USA)	Kathrin Zimmermann (GDR)	Natalya Shibayeva (URS)
200 m backstroke	Cornelia Sirch (GDR)	Betsy Mitchell (USA)	Kathrin Zimmermann (GDR)
100 m breaststroke	Sylvia Gerasch (GDR)	Silke Hörner (GDR)	Tanya Bogomilova (BUL)
200 m breaststroke	Silke Hörner (GDR)	Tanya Bogomilova (BUL)	Allison Higson (CAN)
100 m butterfly	Kornelia Greßler (GDR)	Kristin Otto (GDR)	Mary T. Meagher (USA)
200 m butterfly	Mary T. Meagher (USA)	Kornelia Greßler (GDR)	Birte Weigang (GDR)
200 m individual medley	Kristin Otto (GDR)	Yelena Dendeberova (URS)	Kathleen Nord (GDR)
400 m individual medley	Kathleen Nord (GDR)	Michelle Griglione (USA)	Noemi Lung (ROU)
4 × 100 m freestyle relay	East Germany (GDR); Kristin Otto; Manuela Stellmach; Sabine Schulze; Heike Friedrich	United States (USA); Jenna Johnson; Dara Torres; Mary T. Meagher; Betsy Mitchell	Netherlands (NED); Conny van Bentum; Laura Leideritz; Karin Brienesse; Annemarie Verstappen
4 × 200 m freestyle relay	East Germany (GDR); Manuela Stellmach; Astrid Strauß; Nadja Bergknecht; Heike Friedrich	United States (USA); Betsy Mitchell; Mary T. Meagher; Kim Brown; Mary Wayte	Netherlands (NED); Annemarie Verstappen; Jolanda van de Meer; Marianne Muis; Conny van Bentum
4 × 100 m medley relay	East Germany (GDR); Kathrin Zimmermann; Sylvia Gerasch; Kornelia Greßler; Kristin Otto	United States (USA); Betsy Mitchell; Jenny Hau; Mary T. Meagher; Jenna Johnson	Netherlands (NED); Jolanda de Rover; Petra van Staveren; Conny van Bentum; Annemarie Verstappen

=== Synchronised swimming ===
Event	Gold	Silver	Bronze
Solo routine	Carolyn Waldo (CAN)	Sarah Josephson (USA)	Muriel Hermine (FRA)
Duet routine	Michelle Cameron (CAN); Carolyn Waldo (CAN)	Karen Josephson (USA); Sarah Josephson (USA)	Megumi Itō (JPN); Mikako Kotani (JPN)
Team routine	Canada (CAN)	United States (USA)	Japan (JPN)

=== Water polo ===
Men

Event	Gold	Silver	Bronze
Team	Yugoslavia	Italy	Soviet Union

Women

Event	Gold	Silver	Bronze
Team	Australia	Netherlands	United States
