= Michael Gross (swimmer) =

German swimmer (born 1964)

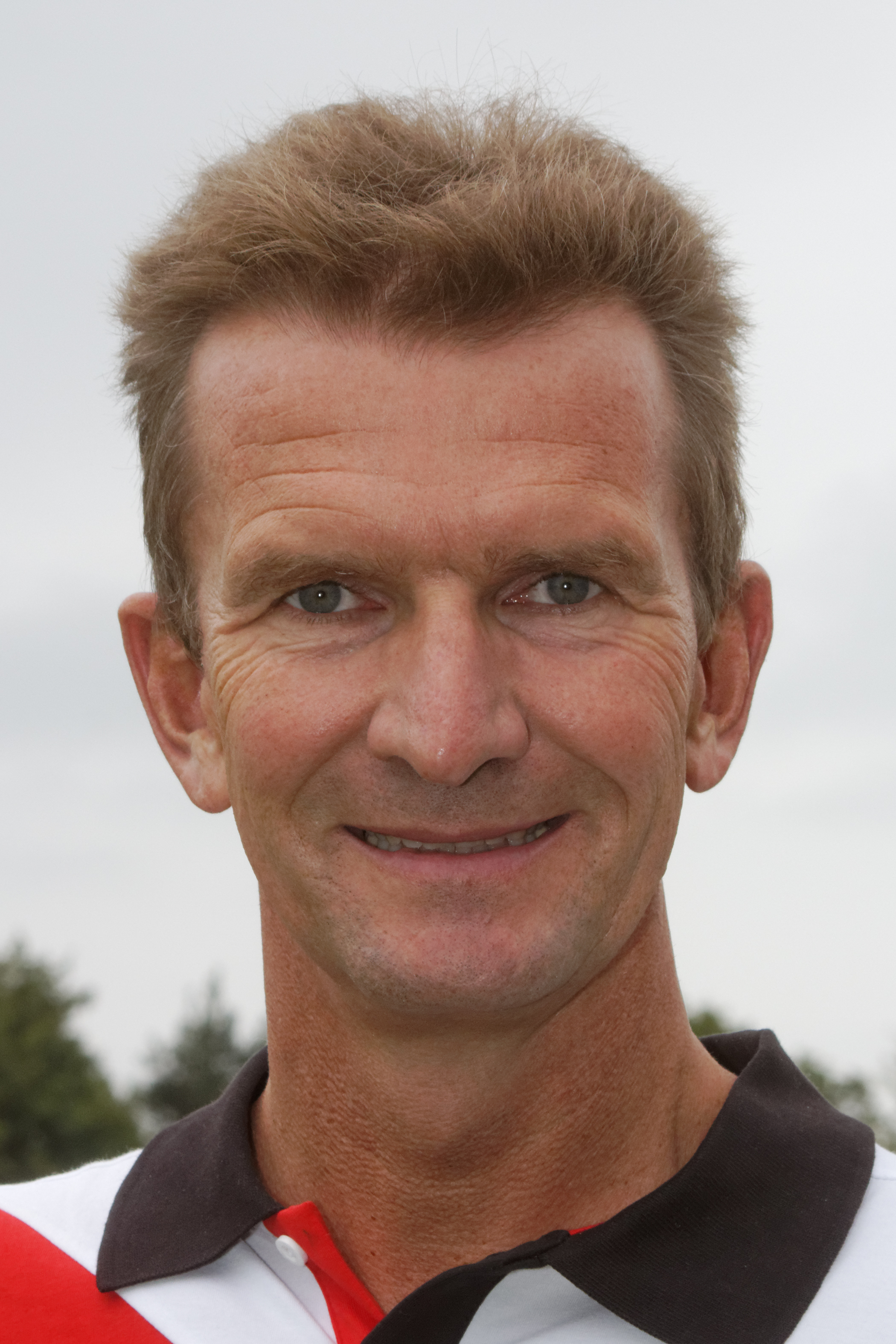
- Gross in 2014

Personal information
- Full name: Michael Gross; Michael Groß (German)
- Nickname: "The Albatross"
- National team: West Germany
- Born: 17 June 1964 (age 62) Frankfurt am Main, Hesse, West Germany
- Height: 2.01 m (6 ft 7 in)
- Weight: 88 kg (194 lb)

Sport
- Sport: Swimming
- Strokes: Butterfly, freestyle
- Club: EOSC Offenbach
Medal record
Men's swimming
Representing West Germany
Event	1st	2nd	3rd
Olympic Games	3	2	1
World Championships (LC)	5	5	3
European Championships (LC)	13	4	2
Universiade	1	1	0
Total	22	12	6
Olympic Games
Gold medal – first place	1984 Los Angeles	200 m freestyle
Gold medal – first place	1984 Los Angeles	100 m butterfly
Gold medal – first place	1988 Seoul	200 m butterfly
Silver medal – second place	1984 Los Angeles	200 m butterfly
Silver medal – second place	1984 Los Angeles	4×200 m freestyle
Bronze medal – third place	1988 Seoul	4×200 m freestyle
World Championships (LC)
Gold medal – first place	1982 Guayaquil	200 m freestyle
Gold medal – first place	1982 Guayaquil	200 m butterfly
Gold medal – first place	1986 Madrid	200 m freestyle
Gold medal – first place	1986 Madrid	200 m butterfly
Gold medal – first place	1991 Perth	4×200 m freestyle
Silver medal – second place	1982 Guayaquil	100 m butterfly
Silver medal – second place	1986 Madrid	4×200 m freestyle
Silver medal – second place	1986 Madrid	4×100 m medley
Silver medal – second place	1991 Perth	100 m butterfly
Silver medal – second place	1991 Perth	200 m butterfly
Bronze medal – third place	1982 Guayaquil	4×200 m freestyle
Bronze medal – third place	1982 Guayaquil	4×100 m medley
Bronze medal – third place	1991 Perth	4×100 m medley
European Championships (LC)
Gold medal – first place	1981 Split	200 m butterfly
Gold medal – first place	1983 Rome	200 m freestyle
Gold medal – first place	1983 Rome	100 m butterfly
Gold medal – first place	1983 Rome	200 m butterfly
Gold medal – first place	1983 Rome	4×200 m freestyle
Gold medal – first place	1985 Sofia	200 m freestyle
Gold medal – first place	1985 Sofia	100 m butterfly
Gold medal – first place	1985 Sofia	200 m butterfly
Gold medal – first place	1985 Sofia	4×100 m freestyle
Gold medal – first place	1985 Sofia	4×200 m freestyle
Gold medal – first place	1985 Sofia	4×100 m medley
Gold medal – first place	1987 Strasbourg	200 m butterfly
Gold medal – first place	1987 Strasbourg	4×200 m freestyle
Silver medal – second place	1981 Split	4×200 m freestyle
Silver medal – second place	1983 Rome	4×100 m medley
Silver medal – second place	1987 Strasbourg	100 m butterfly
Silver medal – second place	1987 Strasbourg	4×100 m freestyle
Bronze medal – third place	1981 Split	4×100 m freestyle
Bronze medal – third place	1987 Strasbourg	200 m freestyle
Summer Universiade
Gold medal – first place	1985 Kobe	200 m butterfly
Bronze medal – third place	1985 Kobe	100 m butterfly

Michael Groß (German pronunciation: [ˈmɪçaʔeːl ˈɡʁoːs]; born 17 June 1964), usually spelled Michael Gross in English, is a former competitive swimmer from Germany. He is 201 centimetres (6 ft 7 in) tall, and received the nickname "The Albatross" for his especially long arms that gave him a total span of 2.13 metres. Gross, competing for West Germany, won three Olympic gold medals, two in 1984 and one in 1988 in the freestyle and butterfly events, in addition to two World Championship titles in 1982, two in 1986 and one in 1991.

== Career ==
Gross was born in Frankfurt am Main, West Germany, and trained as a member of the swimming club EOSC Offenbach. He was probably the finest swimmer in the world in the 200-meter butterfly race from 1981 to 1988. In this period he set four world records, won two world titles, four European titles and two Olympic gold medals.

At the 1984 Summer Olympics in Los Angeles, Gross was one of the great athletes of the games. Gross easily won gold in the 200-meter freestyle, dominating the field. In the 100-meter butterfly, however, Gross pulled off a bit of an upset, winning over the favorite in the event, American Pablo Morales. However, in the 200-meter butterfly, Gross himself was upset by a relative unknown, Australian Jon Sieben. The men's 4×200-meter freestyle relay race became one of the marquee events of the games, with Gross leading the German relay against the underdog American squad. Despite the fact that Gross swam the fastest relay leg in the event's history, the American team pulled off the upset, earning the title of the "Grossbusters."

Gross won a total of thirteen medals at the World Championships (including five gold), thirteen gold medals at the European Championships and was elected German "Athlete of the Year" four times (1982, 1983, 1984 and 1988). He retired from professional swimming in 1991.

He is featured in Bud Greenspan's 16 Days of Glory, the documentary film of the 1984 Summer Olympics.

American gold medalist swimmer John Naber remarked to Sports Illustrated in 1984 that if Michael Gross were an American, he would have won six or seven medals and that Gross was better than Mark Spitz.

Gross was named Male World Swimmer of the Year by Swimming World Magazine in 1985 and inducted to the International Swimming Hall of Fame in 1995.

Gross studied German and media studies as well as political science at the Goethe University Frankfurt and holds a PhD in philology. He married in 1995 and has a daughter (born 1996) and a son (born 1998).

== See also ==
- List of members of the International Swimming Hall of Fame
- German records in swimming
- List of multiple Olympic medalists at a single Games
- World record progression 100 metres butterfly
- World record progression 100 metres freestyle
- World record progression 200 metres butterfly
- World record progression 200 metres freestyle
- World record progression 400 metres freestyle
- World record progression 800 metres freestyle
- World record progression 4 × 200 metres freestyle relay

Records
Preceded by Pablo Morales	Men's 100 metre butterfly world record holder (long course); 30 July 1984 – 23 June 1986	Succeeded by Pablo Morales
Preceded by Craig Beardsley	Men's 200 metre butterfly world record holder (long course); 26 August 1983 – 3 August 1984	Succeeded by Jon Sieben
Preceded by Jon Sieben	Men's 200 metre butterfly world record holder (long course); 29 June 1985 – 12 January 1991	Succeeded by Melvin Stewart
Preceded by Rowdy Gaines	Men's 200 metre freestyle world record holder (long course); 21 June 1983 – 19 September 1988	Succeeded by Duncan Armstrong
Preceded by Vladimir Salnikov	Men's 400 metre freestyle world record holder (long course); 27 June 1985 – 25 March 1988	Succeeded by Artur Wojdat
Awards
Preceded by Toni Mang	German Sportsman of the Year; 1982–1984	Succeeded by Boris Becker
Preceded by Harald Schmid	German Sportsman of the Year; 1988	Succeeded by Boris Becker
Preceded by Alex Baumann	World Swimmer of the Year; 1985	Succeeded by Matt Biondi
Preceded by Sándor Wladár	European Swimmer of the Year; 1982–1986	Succeeded by Tamás Darnyi
