= Kornelia Gressler =

East German swimmer

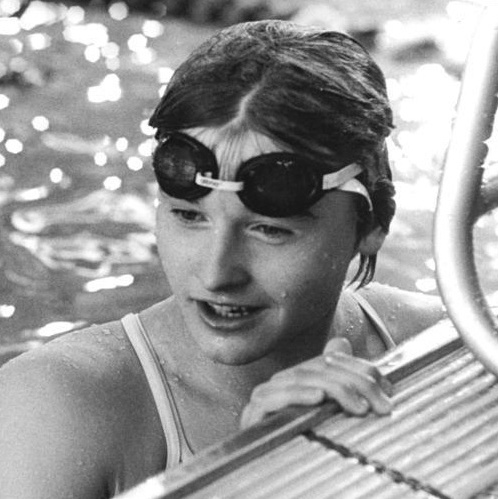
- Kornelia Gressler in 1985

Personal information
- Born: 9 November 1970 (age 55) Arnstadt, East Germany

Sport
- Sport: Swimming
Medal record
Women's swimming
Representing East Germany
World Championships
| Gold medal – first place | 1986 Madrid | 4×100 m freestyle |
| Gold medal – first place | 1986 Madrid | 4×100 m medley |
| Gold medal – first place | 1986 Madrid | 100 m butterfly |
| Silver medal – second place | 1986 Madrid | 200 m butterfly |
European Championships
| Gold medal – first place | 1985 Sofia | 4×100 m medley |
| Gold medal – first place | 1985 Sofia | 100 m butterfly |
| Silver medal – second place | 1985 Sofia | 200 m butterfly |

Kornelia Greßler (born 9 November 1970), usually spelled Kornelia Gressler in English, is a retired East German swimmer who won three medals at the 1985 European Aquatics Championships: gold in the 4×100 m medley relay and gold in the 100 m and silver in the 200 m butterfly events. She repeated this achievement at the 1986 World Aquatics Championships. In 1985, she set a European record in the 100 m butterfly (59.35) that stood for more than 10 years.
