= Ragnar Guðmundsson =

Icelandic swimmer

Personal information
- Born: 2 April 1968 (age 58)

Sport
- Sport: Swimming

Ragnar Guðmundsson (born 2 April 1968) is an Icelandic freestyle swimmer. He competed in two events at the 1988 Summer Olympics.
