= André Schadt =

German swimmer

Sport
- Sport: Swimming
- Club: DSW 1911 Darmstadt
Medal record
Representing West Germany
World Championships
Silver medal – second place	1986 Madrid	4×100 m medley
European Championships
Gold medal – first place	1985 Sofia	4×200 m freestyle
Gold medal – first place	1989 Bonn	4×100 m freestyle

André Schadt is a retired German swimmer who won a silver medal in the 4 × 100 m medley relay at the 1986 World Aquatics Championships. He also won two gold medals in freestyle relays at the European Championships in 1985 and 1989. In 1986 and 1989 he won the national championships in the 100 m freestyle event.

He retired from swimming in 1991.
