= Mariusz Podkościelny =

Polish swimmer (born 1968)

Personal information
- Full name: Mariusz Podkościelny
- National team: Poland
- Born: April 29, 1968 (age 58) Gdańsk, Poland
- Height: 1.93 m (6 ft 4 in)
- Weight: 75 kg (165 lb)

Sport
- Sport: Swimming
- Strokes: Freestyle
- Club: AZS-AWF Gdańsk (POL)
- College team: University of Arizona (U.S.)
Medal record
Men's swimming
Representing Poland
European Championships (LC)
Bronze medal – third place	1989 Bonn	400 m freestyle
Bronze medal – third place	1989 Bonn	1500 m freestyle

Mariusz Podkościelny (born April 29, 1968) is a former freestyle swimmer from Poland, who, twice competed at the Summer Olympics: in 1988 and 1992. Since 2003, he was a swimming coach for the University of Miami. He is currently the head coach for the swim team and teaching history at Pine Crest School in Fort Lauderdale, Florida.

== 1988 Olympics ==
Mariusz finished 5th in both the 400m and 1500m freestyle. In the preliminary round for the 400m, he set the Olympic Record, which he held for about 10 hours.

== Personal life ==
Mariusz married Dagmara, also Polish, and had a daughter named Julia.
