= Dan Jorgensen (swimmer) =

American swimmer (born 1968)

Daniel Jorgensen
Personal information
- Full name: Daniel Ploug Jorgensen
- Nickname: "Dan"
- National team: United States
- Born: April 4, 1968 (age 58) New London, Connecticut, U.S.
- Height: 6 ft 3 in (191 cm)
- Weight: 205 lb (93 kg)

Sport
- Sport: Swimming
- Strokes: Freestyle
- Club: Mission Viejo Nadadores; Germantown Academy Club; Foxcatcher Club
- College team: U. Southern Cal.
- Coach: Mark Schubert (Nadadores); Peter Daland, (USC)
Medal record
Men's swimming
Representing the United States
Olympic Games
Gold medal – first place	1988 Seoul	4x200 m freestyle
Bronze medal – third place	1992 Barcelona	4x200 m freestyle
World Championships (LC)
Silver medal – second place	1991 Perth	4x200 m freestyle
Bronze medal – third place	1986 Madrid	400 m freestyle
Bronze medal – third place	1986 Madrid	1500 m freestyle
Bronze medal – third place	1986 Madrid	4x200 m freestyle
Pan Pacific Championships
Gold medal – first place	1989 Tokyo	4x200 m freestyle
Gold medal – first place	1991 Edmonton	4x200 m freestyle
Silver medal – second place	1987 Brisbane	1500 m freestyle
Silver medal – second place	1989 Tokyo	400 m freestyle
Bronze medal – third place	1989 Tokyo	800 m freestyle
Bronze medal – third place	1991 Edmonton	400 m freestyle

Daniel Ploug Jorgensen (born April 4, 1968) is an American former competition swimmer who competed for the University of Southern California and represented the United States at two consecutive Olympic Games, winning a gold in the 4x200 freestyle relay at the 1988 Seoul Olympics and a bronze in the 4x200 freestyle relay at the 1992 Barcelona Olympics.

== Early life and swimming ==
Jorgensen was born April 4, 1968, in New London, Connecticut, to father Niels Jorgensen and wife. A swimming family, Jorgensen's father coached swimming in Connecticut for a Coast Guard team, for California's Rancho Bernardo Swim team in 1985 and later for San Diego's Blue Fins Swim Team. Dan's younger brother Lars swam in the 1988 Olympics for the United States, and later became a college coach at the University of Kentucky.

Dan Jorgensen swam for California's Mission Viejo Nadadores as early as the summer of 1983 when he was 15, and attended Mission Viejo High School, graduating in 1986, after which the family moved to San Diego. Mission Viejo High had been recognized as a national champion. Jorgensen trained and competed for his Mission Viejo High School during the school year, and the Nadadores in the off-season, where his workouts often consisted of both a two-hour morning and a two-hour evening practice, with weight training after the evening practice. He did more of his intensive training with the Nadadores, and competed for his High School in dual meets when he was needed. He placed third in the 1500-meter Men's freestyle and eighth in the Men's 400-meter freestyle at the 1984 Olympic trials in Indianapolis, but did not place high enough to qualify for the U.S. Team, though a second place finish would have qualified him in the 1500.

As a High School Junior in 1985, Jorgensen won the 200 and 500-yard freestyle events to help the Nadadores capture the Southern Sectional 4A title, with the team having won the event many times. Jorgensen swam a record time for the meet of 4:19.53 for the 500-yard event, earning him Swimmer of the Year honors from the Los Angeles Times. He continued to represent the Nadadores at times in 1985, but also swam some for the Irvine Novas that year. Through 1984 and most of 1985, Mark Schubert was the Nadadore's Head Swimming Coach, followed by Terry Stoddard, though Jorgensen also received training from his swim coach father Niels while at the Nadadores. Schubert was also one of the U.S. Men's Olympic swimming team coaches in 1988 and 1992 when Jorgensen competed and medaled.

Though it may not have been official, on August 5, 1985, Jorgensen posted the World's fastest time of 7:58.71 in the 800-meter freestyle at the Phillips-66 Long Course National Championships at the Mission Viejo Swim Complex.

== University of Southern California ==
Jorgenson competed for the University of Southern California beginning in the Fall of 1986, where he was coached by Hall of Fame Coach Peter Daland, who coached the team through 1992. While at USC, he won two National Collegiate Athletic Association titles.

== 1988 Seoul Olympic gold ==
At the 1988 Summer Olympics, Jorgensen swam in the 400-meter freestyle and finished fourteenth, not advancing to the finals. His time was 3:55.34. He won the gold medal in the men's 4×200-meter freestyle relay, where the team recorded a combined time in the finals of 7:12.51, though he did not swim in the finals. Jorgensen swam the second leg of the 4x200 in Lane 4 of preliminary Heat 1, where he was part of the 4-man American team of Craig Opel, Matt Cetlinski, and Doug Gjertsen. The team received a combined time in the Heat 1 preliminary of 7:18.76, though Jorgensen did not swim in the final heat of the event. Jorgensen swam his leg in the heat 1 preliminary in a time of 1:49.24.

== 1992 Barcelona Olympic bronze ==
At the 1992 Summer Olympics in Barcelona, Spain, Jorgensen again swam in the preliminary heats of the men's 4×200-meter freestyle relay, and received a bronze medal when the U.S. team placed third in the event final with a combined time of 7:16.23. Jorgensen's team of four swam in the third preliminary recording a time of 7:23.70, which helped the U.S. team advance to the finals, but Jorgensen did not swim with the four person U.S. team that competed in the finals.

At the 1992 Games, Jorgensen also swam in the preliminary heats of the men's 400-meter freestyle, but did not advance placing seventeenth overall with a 3:53.20. At the 1992 Olympics, Jorgenson was partly managed by Hall of Fame Coach Dick Shoulberg, who was the U.S. Assistant Olympic Coach that year.

Jorgenson trained with Shoulberg for the 1992 season for a period at the Germantown Academy pool, where Shoulberg was Head Coach.

=== International competition highlights ===
At the World Championships Jorgensen captured a silver medal in the 1991 4x200 relay at the 1991 World Championships. He won three bronze medals in 1986 at the World's in the 4x200 free, the 400 free, and the 1,500 free relay. At the Pan Pacifics, Jorgensen captured gold medals in his signature event, the 4x200 freestyle, in 1989 and 1991. He won individual medals at the Pan Pacifics in various years from 1987-91 in the 1,500 freestyle, 400 freestyle, and 800 freestyle events.

=== Life after elite swimming ===
Jorgensen competed with United States Masters Swimming in Oregon's greater Portland area, continuing to compete from 1995-2024, entering largely 100, 200, 400 and 1500 freestyle events, but also the occasional 200 Individual Medley.

After his competitive swimming career, Jorgensen, with his wife and two daughters, lived in Beaverton, Oregon, in the greater Portland area. He worked different jobs for a number of years, including a position with a steel mill, and later sold equipment for the medical industry. He had a longer term career with S. R. Smith, a pool deck equipment manufacturing company. At S.R. Smith, he eventually ascended to the position of vice-president. Touting his Masters in Business Administration, he later worked in Sales for API International, a manufacturer and supplier of flanges, valves, expansion joints, pump connectors, and fittings for piping systems. The company also provided custom manufactured parts for a number of industries including Water Works and High Voltage Air Conditioning.

== See also ==
- List of Olympic medalists in swimming (men)
- List of University of Southern California people
- List of World Aquatics Championships medalists in swimming (men)
