= Aleksandr Bazhanov =

Russian swimmer

Personal information
- Nationality: Russian
- Born: 16 April 1965 (age 61)

Sport
- Sport: Swimming

Aleksandr Bazhanov (born 16 April 1965) is a Russian swimmer. He competed in two events at the 1988 Summer Olympics.
