= Thomas Fahrner =

German swimmer

Personal information
- Full name: Thomas Fahrner
- Nationality: West German
- Born: 7 February 1963 (age 63) Ludwigshafen, Rheinland-Pfalz, West Germany
- Height: 1.87 m (6 ft 2 in)
- Weight: 80 kg (176 lb)

Sport
- Sport: Swimming
- Strokes: Freestyle
- Club: EOSC Offenbach
Medal record
Men's swimming
Representing West Germany
Olympic Games
Silver medal – second place	1984 Los Angeles	4×200 m freestyle
Bronze medal – third place	1984 Los Angeles	200 m freestyle
Bronze medal – third place	1988 Seoul	4×200 m freestyle
World Championships (LC)
Silver medal – second place	1986 Madrid	4×200 m freestyle
European Championships (LC)
Gold medal – first place	1983 Rome	4×200 m freestyle
Gold medal – first place	1985 Sofia	4×100 m freestyle
Gold medal – first place	1985 Sofia	4×200 m freestyle
Gold medal – first place	1987 Strasbourg	4×200 m freestyle
Silver medal – second place	1987 Strasbourg	4×100 m freestyle
Bronze medal – third place	1983 Rome	200 m freestyle
Bronze medal – third place	1987 Strasbourg	400 m freestyle
Summer Universiade
Bronze medal – third place	1985 Kobe	400 m freestyle

Thomas Fahrner (born 7 February 1963 in Ludwigshafen, Rhineland-Palatinate) is a former freestyle swimmer from West Germany. At the 1984 Summer Olympics in Los Angeles Fahrner earned two medals bronze in the 200 m freestyle and silver in 4×200 m freestyle relay. He also set an Olympic record for the 400 m freestyle (3:50.91) in the B final. Four years later at the 1988 Summer Olympics in Seoul he earned another medal this time a bronze medal in the 4×200 m freestyle relay.

Fahrner attended the University of Southern California.

== See also ==
- List of German records in swimming
