= Rainer Henkel =

German swimmer

Personal information
- Nationality: German
- Born: 27 February 1964 (age 62) Opladen, North Rhine-Westphalia, West Germany
- Height: 1.98 m (6 ft 6 in)
- Weight: 85 kg (187 lb)

Sport
- Sport: Swimming
- Strokes: Freestyle
- Club: SV Rhenania Köln 1919 eV
Medal record
Men's swimming
Representing West Germany
Olympic Games
Silver medal – second place	1984 Los Angeles	4×200 m freestyle
Bronze medal – third place	1988 Seoul	4×200 m freestyle
World Championships (LC)
Gold medal – first place	1986 Madrid	400 m freestyle
Gold medal – first place	1986 Madrid	1500 m freestyle
Silver medal – second place	1986 Madrid	4×200 m freestyle
Bronze medal – third place	1982 Guayaquil	4×200 m freestyle
European Championships (LC)
Gold medal – first place	1987 Strasbourg	1500 m freestyle
Gold medal – first place	1987 Strasbourg	4×200 m freestyle
Silver medal – second place	1985 Sofia	1500 m freestyle
Silver medal – second place	1987 Strasbourg	400 m freestyle
Bronze medal – third place	1985 Sofia	400 m freestyle

Rainer Henkel (born 27 February 1964 in Opladen) is a retired freestyle swimmer from Germany, former World and European Champion in 1500 m freestyle. He also won the silver medal in the 4×200 m freestyle relay for West Germany at the 1984 Summer Olympics in Los Angeles and the bronze medal in the 4×200 m freestyle relay for West Germany at the 1988 Summer Olympics in Seoul.

== Career ==
At the World Championships Henkel won four medals: two golds in the 400 m freestyle and 1500 m freestyle in 1986, silver in the 4×200 m freestyle, and bronze in the 4×200 m freestyle. Furthermore, he won five medals at the European Championships: two golds in the 1500 m freestyle and 4×200 m freestyle in 1987, two silver medals in the 1500 m freestyle in 1985 and the 400 m freestyle in 1987, and one bronze in the 400 m freestyle in 1985.

== Private life ==
From 1989 to 2001 he was married to the former German high jumper Heike Henkel.
