= Yang Gam =

South Korean swimmer

Personal information
- Born: 18 April 1973 (age 53)

Sport
- Sport: Swimming

Yang Gam (born 18 April 1973) is a South Korean freestyle swimmer. He competed in four events at the 1988 Summer Olympics.
