= Dmitry Volkov (swimmer) =

Russian swimmer (1966–2025)

Personal information
- Born: 30 March 1966 Moscow, Russian SFSR, USSR
- Died: 16 January 2025 (aged 58) Moscow, Russia
- Height: 187 cm (6 ft 2 in)
- Weight: 87 kg (192 lb)

Sport
- Sport: Swimming
Medal record
Representing Soviet Union
Olympic Games
Bronze medal – third place	1988 Seoul	100m breaststroke
Bronze medal – third place	1988 Seoul	4x100m medley relay
World Championships
Silver medal – second place	1991 Perth	4x100m medley relay
Bronze medal – third place	1986 Madrid	100m breaststroke
Bronze medal – third place	1986 Madrid	4x100m medley relay
European Championships
Gold medal – first place	1985 Sofia	200m breaststroke
Gold medal – first place	1987 Strasbourg	4x100m medley relay
Gold medal – first place	1989 Bonn	4x100m medley relay
Gold medal – first place	1991 Athens	4x100m medley relay
Silver medal – second place	1987 Strasbourg	100m breaststroke
Silver medal – second place	1989 Bonn	100m breaststroke
Bronze medal – third place	1985 Sofia	100m breaststroke
Representing Unified Team
Olympic Games
Silver medal – second place	1992 Barcelona	4x100m medley relay

Dmitry Arkadyevich Volkov (Russian: Дмитрий Аркадьевич Волков; 30 March 1966 – 16 January 2025) was a Russian two-time Olympic breaststroke swimmer. He swam at the 1988 and 1992 Olympics.

At the 1988 Olympics, he garnered bronze medals in the 100 Breaststroke and as part of the Soviet Union's 4x100 Medley Relay. At the 1992 Olympics, he garnered a silver medal as part of the Unified Team's 4x100 Medley Relay.

Volkov died in Moscow at the age of 58 on 16 January 2025, after a long battle with cancer.
