= Swimming at the 1988 Summer Olympics – Men's 200 metre backstroke =

Men's 200 metre backstroke at the Games of the XXIV Olympiad
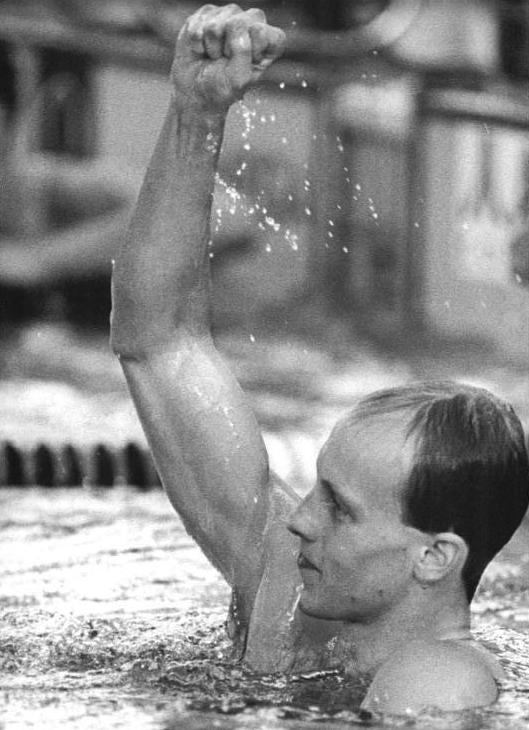
- Silver medalist Frank Baltrusch (earlier in 1988)
- Venue: Jamsil Indoor Swimming Pool
- Date: 22 September 1988 (heats & finals)
- Competitors: 44 from 32 nations
- Winning time: 1:59.37

Medalists
1st place, gold medalist(s)		Igor Polyansky	Soviet Union
2nd place, silver medalist(s)		Frank Baltrusch	East Germany
3rd place, bronze medalist(s)		Paul Kingsman	New Zealand

The men's 200 metre backstroke event at the 1988 Summer Olympics took place on 22 September at the Jamsil Indoor Swimming Pool in Seoul, South Korea. There were 44 competitors from 32 nations. Each nation had been limited to two swimmers in the event since 1984. The event was won by Igor Polyansky of the Soviet Union. Frank Baltrusch of East Germany took silver, while Paul Kingsman of New Zealand earned bronze. The medals were the first in the men's 200 metre backstroke for the Soviet Union and New Zealand; East Germany had not medaled in the event since Roland Matthes won gold in 1968 and 1972. For the first time, the United States competed and did not earn at least silver.

The award ceremony did not go smoothly. Kingsman was erroneously introduced as being from the Soviet Union. When his nationality was corrected to New Zealand, it was also announced that the New Zealand national anthem would be played. This had to be corrected as well, and the Soviet anthem (for the winner, Polyansky) was played.

== Background ==
This was the eighth appearance of the 200 metre backstroke event. It was first held in 1900. The event did not return until 1964; since then, it has been on the programme at every Summer Games. From 1904 to 1960, a men's 100 metre backstroke was held instead. In 1964, only the 200 metres was held. Beginning in 1968 and ever since, both the 100 and 200 metre versions have been held.

None of the 8 finalists from the 1984 Games returned. The medalists at the 1986 World Aquatics Championships had been Igor Polyansky of the Soviet Union, Frank Baltrusch of East Germany, and Frank Hoffmeister of West Germany. All three competed in Seoul. Polyansky was also the world record holder, having set it in a Soviet-East German dual meet in 1985. He was the heavy favourite in the event, with his only loss since 1985 being the European championship (to fellow Soviet Sergei Zabolotnov).

Costa Rica, Guam, Iceland, Lebanon, Singapore, South Korea, the United Arab Emirates, and Zimbabwe each made their debut in the event. Australia and Great Britain each made their seventh appearance, tied for most among nations to that point.

== Competition format ==
The competition used a two-round (heats and final) format. The advancement rule followed the format introduced in 1952. A swimmer's place in the heat was not used to determine advancement; instead, the fastest times from across all heats in a round were used. A "consolation final" had been added in 1984. There were 6 heats of up to 8 swimmers each. The top 8 swimmers advanced to the final. The next 8 (9th through 16th) competed in a consolation final. Swim-offs were used as necessary to break ties.

This swimming event used backstroke. Because an Olympic-size swimming pool is 50 metres long, this race consisted of four lengths of the pool.

== Records ==
Prior to this competition, the existing world and Olympic records were as follows.

World record	Igor Polyansky (URS)	1:58.14	Erfurt, East Germany	3 March 1985
Olympic record	Rick Carey (USA)	1:58.99	Los Angeles, United States	31 July 1984

== Schedule ==
All times are Korea Standard Time adjusted for daylight savings (UTC+10)

Date	Time	Round
Thursday, 22 September 1988	10:00; 20:00	Finals

== Results ==
=== Heats ===
The eight fastest swimmers advanced to Final A, while the next eight went to Final B.

Rank	Heat	Swimmer	Nation	Time	Notes
1	6	Sergei Zabolotnov	Soviet Union	2:01.27	QA
2	5	Frank Baltrusch	East Germany	2:01.49	QA
3	4	Dirk Richter	East Germany	2:01.54	QA
4	6	Igor Polyansky	Soviet Union	2:01.70	QA
5	4	Dan Veatch	United States	2:01.73	QA
6	6	Jens-Peter Berndt	West Germany	2:01.77	QA
7	6	Paul Kingsman	New Zealand	2:02.20	QA
8	5	Rogério Romero	Brazil	2:02.26	QA
9	4	Georgi Mihalev	Bulgaria	2:02.71	QB
10	6	Tamás Deutsch	Hungary	2:03.17	QB
11	5	Martín López-Zubero	Spain	2:03.33	QB
12	4	Frank Hoffmeister	West Germany	2:03.34	QB
13	5	Daichi Suzuki	Japan	2:03.36	QB
14	5	Stefano Battistelli	Italy	2:03.63	QB, WD
15	4	Steve Bigelow	United States	2:03.64	QB
16	3	Gary Binfield	Great Britain	2:03.79	QB
17	4	Sean Murphy	Canada	2:03.81	QB, WD
18	5	Mark Tewksbury	Canada	2:04.02	QB
19	3	Alejandro Alvizuri	Peru	2:04.29	
20	3	John Davey	Great Britain	2:04.70	
21	6	David Holderbach	France	2:04.83	
22	3	Ernesto Vela	Mexico	2:05.08	
22	6	Simon Upton	Australia	2:05.08	
24	5	Eðvarð Þór Eðvarðsson	Iceland	2:05.61	
25	3	Richard Gheel	Ireland	2:05.71	
26	6	Lars Sørensen	Denmark	2:05.73	
27	2	Stephen Cullen	Ireland	2:06.98	
28	4	Pavel Vokoun	Czechoslovakia	2:07.24	
29	2	Patrick Ferland	Switzerland	2:07.77	
30	3	Lin Laijiu	China	2:08.28	
31	2	David Lim Fong Jock	Singapore	2:08.65	
32	3	Shigemori Maruyama	Japan	2:09.16	
33	2	Wladimir Ribeiro	Brazil	2:11.48	
34	2	Horst Niehaus	Costa Rica	2:12.83	
35	2	Eric Greenwood	Costa Rica	2:15.42	
36	2	Patrick Sagisi	Guam	2:15.82	
37	1	Brett Halford	Zimbabwe	2:17.84	
38	1	Pablo Barahona	Honduras	2:21.61	
39	1	Mohamed Abdullah	United Arab Emirates	2:29.64	
40	1	Mohamed Bin Abid	United Arab Emirates	2:36.21	
41	1	Rami Kantari	Lebanon	2:40.29	
—	2	Park Dong-pil	South Korea	DSQ	
—	3	Charalambos Papanikolaou	Greece	DSQ	
—	5	Tamás Darnyi	Hungary	DSQ	

=== Finals ===
The finals were held in the evening of 22 September.

==== Final B ====
Rank	Lane	Swimmer	Nation	Time
9	6	Frank Hoffmeister	West Germany	2:01.65
10	7	Steve Bigelow	United States	2:02.95
11	3	Martín López-Zubero	Spain	2:03.70
12	8	Mark Tewksbury	Canada	2:03.79
13	4	Georgi Mihalev	Bulgaria	2:04.24
14	5	Tamás Deutsch	Hungary	2:04.42
15	2	Daichi Suzuki	Japan	2:04.67
16	1	Gary Binfield	Great Britain	2:04.90

==== Final A ====
Zabalotnov led at the halfway mark. Polyansky took the lead during the third length, with Baltrusch and Kingsman also passing Zabolotnov.

Rank	Lane	Swimmer	Nation	Time	Notes
1st place, gold medalist(s)	6	Igor Polyansky	Soviet Union	1:59.37	
2nd place, silver medalist(s)	5	Frank Baltrusch	East Germany	1:59.60	
3rd place, bronze medalist(s)	1	Paul Kingsman	New Zealand	2:00.48	NR
4	4	Sergei Zabolotnov	Soviet Union	2:00.52	
5	3	Dirk Richter	East Germany	2:01.67	
6	7	Jens-Peter Berndt	West Germany	2:01.84	
7	2	Dan Veatch	United States	2:02.26	
8	8	Rogério Romero	Brazil	2:02.28	
