= Swimming at the 1988 Summer Olympics – Men's 100 metre backstroke =

Men's 100 metre backstroke at the Games of the XXIV Olympiad
- Venue: Jamsil Indoor Swimming Pool
- Date: 24 September 1988 (heats & finals)
- Competitors: 54 from 42 nations
- Winning time: 55.05 AS

Medalists
1st place, gold medalist(s)		Daichi Suzuki	Japan
2nd place, silver medalist(s)		David Berkoff	United States
3rd place, bronze medalist(s)		Igor Polyansky	Soviet Union

The men's 100 metre backstroke event at the 1988 Summer Olympics took place on 24 September at the Jamsil Indoor Swimming Pool in Seoul, South Korea.

== Records ==
Prior to this competition, the existing world and Olympic records were as follows.

World record	David Berkoff (USA)	54.91	Austin, United States	13 August 1988
Olympic record	Rick Carey (USA)	55.41	Los Angeles, CA, United States	4 August 1984

The following records were established during the competition:

Date	Round	Name	Nationality	Time	Record
24 September	Heat 6	Igor Polyansky	Soviet Union	55.04	OR
24 September	Heat 7	David Berkoff	United States	54.51	WR

== Results ==
=== Heats ===
Rule: The eight fastest swimmers advance to final A (Q), while the next eight to final B (q).

Rank	Heat	Name	Nationality	Time	Notes
1	7	David Berkoff	United States	54.51	Q, WR
2	6	Igor Polyansky	Soviet Union	55.04	Q
3	7	Daichi Suzuki	Japan	55.90	Q
4	7	Sergei Zabolotnov	Soviet Union	56.13	Q
5	7	Frank Hoffmeister	West Germany	56.19	Q
6	5	Sean Murphy	Canada	56.20	Q
6	6	Mark Tewksbury	Canada	56.20	Q
8	6	Frank Baltrusch	East Germany	56.45	Q
9	5	Dirk Richter	East Germany	56.52	q
10	6	Franck Schott	France	56.76	q
11	6	Georgi Mihalev	Bulgaria	57.06	q
12	5	Jens-Peter Berndt	West Germany	57.08	q, WD
13	5	Jay Mortenson	United States	57.19	q
14	3	David Lim Fong Jock	Singapore	57.34	q, NR
15	5	Shigemori Maruyama	Japan	57.54	q
16	4	Manuel Guzmán	Puerto Rico	57.62	q
17	5	Eðvarð Þór Eðvarðsson	Iceland	57.70	q
18	6	Lin Laijiu	China	57.74	
19	7	Paul Kingsman	New Zealand	57.80	
20	7	Rogério Romero	Brazil	57.91	
21	6	Lars Sørensen	Denmark	58.01	
22	4	Neil Harper	Great Britain	58.02	
23	4	Martín López-Zubero	Spain	58.06	
24	4	Patrick Ferland	Switzerland	58.17	
25	3	Neil Cochran	Great Britain	58.25	
26	3	Alejandro Alvizuri	Peru	58.37	
27	5	Carl Wilson	Australia	58.40	
28	4	Tamás Deutsch	Hungary	58.65	
29	3	Stephen Cullen	Ireland	58.82	
30	5	Pavel Vokoun	Czechoslovakia	58.88	
31	4	Renaud Boucher	France	58.90	
32	5	Simon Upton	Australia	59.06	
33	3	Ernesto Vela	Mexico	59.19	
34	3	Ilias Malamas	Greece	59.24	
35	4	Huang Guoxiong	China	59.36	
36	3	Richard Gheel	Ireland	59.37	
37	5	Valerio Giambalvo	Italy	59.48	
38	4	Wladimir Ribeiro	Brazil	59.76	
39	3	Amin Amer	Egypt	1:00.76	
40	2	Park Dong-pil	South Korea	1:01.25	
41	2	Patrick Sagisi	Guam	1:01.86	
42	2	Yip Hor Man	Hong Kong	1:01.91	
42	2	Horst Niehaus	Costa Rica	1:01.91	
44	2	Brett Halford	Zimbabwe	1:02.95	
45	2	Eric Greenwood	Costa Rica	1:03.11	
46	2	Pablo Barahona	Honduras	1:03.90	
47	2	Bruno N'Diaye	Senegal	1:05.06	
48	1	Filippo Piva	San Marino	1:07.63	
49	1	Mohamed Abdullah	United Arab Emirates	1:08.91	
50	1	Rami Kantari	Lebanon	1:09.35	
51	1	Mohamed Bin Abid	United Arab Emirates	1:10.01	
52	1	Yul Mark Du Pont	Swaziland	1:12.50	
	1	Paul Yelle	Barbados	DNS	

=== Finals ===
==== Final B ====
Rank	Lane	Name	Nationality	Time	Notes
9	4	Dirk Richter	East Germany	56.66	
10	5	Franck Schott	France	56.98	
11	6	Jay Mortenson	United States	57.06	
12	7	Shigemori Maruyama	Japan	57.13	
13	3	Georgi Mihalev	Bulgaria	57.17	
14	2	David Lim Fong Jock	Singapore	57.72	
15	1	Manuel Guzmán	Puerto Rico	57.95	
16	8	Eðvarð Þór Eðvarðsson	Iceland	58.20	

=== Final A ===
Rank	Lane	Name	Nationality	Time	Notes
1st place, gold medalist(s)	3	Daichi Suzuki	Japan	55.05	AS
2nd place, silver medalist(s)	4	David Berkoff	United States	55.18	
3rd place, bronze medalist(s)	5	Igor Polyansky	Soviet Union	55.20	
4	6	Sergei Zabolotnov	Soviet Union	55.37	
5	1	Mark Tewksbury	Canada	56.09	
6	8	Frank Baltrusch	East Germany	56.10	
7	2	Frank Hoffmeister	West Germany	56.19	
8	7	Sean Murphy	Canada	56.32	
