= Swimming at the 1988 Summer Olympics – Men's 4 × 100 metre medley relay =

Men's 4 × 100 metre medley relay at the Games of the XXIV Olympiad
- Venue: Jamsil Indoor Swimming Pool
- Date: 25 September 1988 (heats & final)
- Competitors: 109 from 25 nations
- Teams: 25
- Winning time: 3:36.93 WR

Medalists
1st place, gold medalist(s)		David Berkoff, Richard Schroeder, Matt Biondi, Chris Jacobs, Jay Mortenson*, Tom Jager*	United States
2nd place, silver medalist(s)		Mark Tewksbury, Victor Davis, Tom Ponting, Sandy Goss	Canada
3rd place, bronze medalist(s)		Igor Polyansky, Dmitry Volkov, Vadim Yaroshchuk, Gennadiy Prigoda, Sergei Zabolotnov*, Valeriy Lozik*, Konstantin Petrov*, Nikolay Yevseyev*; *Indicates the swimmer only competed in the preliminary heats.	Soviet Union

The men's 4 × 100 metre medley relay event at the 1988 Summer Olympics took place on 25 September at the Jamsil Indoor Swimming Pool in Seoul, South Korea.

== Records ==
Prior to this competition, the existing world and Olympic records were as follows.

World record	United States (USA); Rick Carey; John Moffet; Pablo Morales; Matt Biondi	3:38.28	Tokyo, Japan	18 August 1985
Olympic record	United States; Rick Carey (55.41); Steve Lundquist (1:01.86); Pablo Morales (52.87); Rowdy Gaines (49.16)	3:39.30	Los Angeles, United States	4 August 1984

The following new world and Olympic records were set during this competition.

Date	Event	Name	Nationality	Time	Record
25 September	Final	David Berkoff (54.56); Richard Schroeder (1:01.64); Matt Biondi (52.38); Chris Jacobs (48.35)	United States	3:36.93	WR

== Results ==
=== Heats ===
Rule: The eight fastest teams advance to the final (Q).

Rank	Heat	Nation	Swimmers	Time	Notes
1	4	United States	David Berkoff (55.69); Richard Schroeder (1:01.64); Jay Mortenson (54.46); Tom Jager (51.21)	3:43.00	Q
2	3	Great Britain	Gary Binfield (57.89); Adrian Moorhouse (1:02.33); Andy Jameson (53.47); Roland Lee (50.75)	3:44.44	Q
3	2	Canada	Mark Tewksbury (57.05); Victor Davis (1:03.14); Tom Ponting (54.12); Sandy Goss (50.25)	3:44.56	Q
4	4	West Germany	Frank Hoffmeister (57.04); Mark Warnecke (1:03.80); Michael Gross (54.41); Björn Zikarsky (49.47)	3:44.72	Q
5	3	Soviet Union	Sergei Zabolotnov (57.14); Valeriy Lozik (1:02.80); Konstantine Petrov (55.02); Nikolay Yevseyev (50.33)	3:45.29	Q
6	2	Netherlands	Hans Kroes (58.11); Ronald Dekker (1:02.42); Frank Drost (54.50); Patrick Dybiona (50.62)	3:45.65	Q
7	4	Japan	Daichi Suzuki (56.24); Hironobu Nagahata (1:03.51); Hiroshi Miura (55.65); Shigeo Ogata (51.48)	3:46.88	Q
8	2	Australia	Carl Wilson (58.31); Ian McAdam (1:05.17); Jon Sieben (54.65); Andrew Baildon (49.27)	3:47.40	Q
9	3	Switzerland	Patrick Ferland (58.27); Étienne Dagon (1:04.61); Dano Halsall (55.71); Stéfan Voléry (49.50)	3:48.09	
10	4	France	Franck Schott (57.04); David Leblanc (1:04.85); Ludovic Depickère (56.37); Bruno Gutzeit (50.38)	3:48.64	
11	3	New Zealand	Paul Kingsman (57.73); Anthony Beks (1:05.43); Anthony Mosse (54.03); Ross Anderson (51.74)	3:48.93	
12	4	Spain	Martín López-Zubero (58.05); Ramón Camallonga (1:04.67); José Luis Ballester (55.66); José Hernando (51.09)	3:49.47	
13	2	Czechoslovakia	Pavel Vokoun (59.25); Radek Beinhauer (1:03.71); Robert Wolf (56.23); Petr Kladiva (50.71)	3:49.90	
14	4	Denmark	Lars Sørensen (58.17); Christian Toft (1:07.32); Benny Nielsen (55.57); Franz Mortensen (50.91)	3:51.97	
15	3	Italy	Valerio Giambalvo (59.70); Gianni Minervini (1:05.06); Leonardo Michelotti (56.76); Roberto Gleria (50.54)	3:52.06	
16	2	Hungary	Tamás Deutsch (58.52); Károly Güttler (1:03.59); Valter Kalaus (58.30); Mihály-Richard Bodór (51.83)	3:52.24	
17	4	Singapore	David Lim Fong Jock (58.03); Ng Yue Meng (1:05.89); Ang Peng Siong (56.63); Oon Jin Gee (52.31)	3:52.86	
18	3	Brazil	Rogério Romero (57.99); Cícero Tortelli (1:06.54); Eduardo de Poli (56.65); Emanuel Nascimento (52.03)	3:53.21	
19	2	China	Lin Laijiu (59.32); Chen Jianhong (1:04.73); Zheng Jian (57.04); Shen Jianqiang (53.09)	3:54.18	
20	3	Mexico	Ernesto Vela (59.16); Javier Careaga (1:06.07); Urbano Zea (57.66); Rodrigo González (51.32)	3:54.21	
21	1	South Korea	Park Dong-pil (1:01.38); Yoon Joo-il (1:04.42); Park Yeong-cheol (56.96); Kwon Sang-won (54.18)	3:56.94	
22	4	Hong Kong	Yip Hor Man (1:03.23); Watt Kam Sing (1:08.53); Tsang Yi Ming (59.44); Michael Wright (54.08)	4:05.28	
23	2	Greece	Ilias Malamas (59.88); Nikolaos Fokianos (1:07.61); Theodoros Griniazakis (1:01.09); Charalambos Papanikolaou (59.13)	4:07.71	
24	1	Virgin Islands	William Cleveland (1:05.06); Kraig Singleton (1:13.73); Kristan Singleton (1:01.93); Hans Foerster (54.31)	4:15.03	
25	1	United Arab Emirates	Mohamed Abdullah (1:08.35); Obaid Al-Rumaithi (1:15.72); Mohamed Bin Abid (1:06.57); Ahmad Faraj (57.91)	4:28.55	

=== Final ===
Rank	Lane	Nation	Swimmers	Time	Notes
1st place, gold medalist(s)	4	United States	David Berkoff (54.56); Richard Schroeder (1:01.64); Matt Biondi (52.38); Chris Jacobs (48.35)	3:36.93	WR
2nd place, silver medalist(s)	3	Canada	Mark Tewksbury (56.11); Victor Davis (1:00.90); Tom Ponting (53.52); Sandy Goss (48.75)	3:39.28	NR
3rd place, bronze medalist(s)	2	Soviet Union	Igor Polyansky (55.35); Dmitry Volkov (1:01.53); Vadim Yaroshchuk (53.34); Gennadiy Prigoda (49.74)	3:39.96	
4	6	West Germany	Frank Hoffmeister (57.18); Alexander Mayer (1:03.12); Michael Gross (53.17); Björn Zikarsky (49.51)	3:42.98	
5	1	Japan	Daichi Suzuki (55.87); Hironobu Nagahata (1:02.75); Hiroshi Miura (54.18); Shigeo Ogata (51.56)	3:44.36	NR
6	8	Australia	Carl Wilson (57.85); Ian McAdam (1:05.01); Jon Sieben (53.42); Andrew Baildon (49.57)	3:45.85	
7	7	Netherlands	Hans Kroes (58.26); Ronald Dekker (1:03.40); Frank Drost (54.48); Patrick Dybiona (50.41)	3:46.55	
	5	Great Britain	Neil Harper; Adrian Moorhouse; Andy Jameson; Mark Foster	DSQ	
