= Swimming at the 1988 Summer Olympics – Men's 100 metre breaststroke =

Men's 100 metre breaststroke at the Games of the XXIV Olympiad
- Venue: Jamsil Indoor Swimming Pool
- Date: 18 September 1988 (heats); 19 September 1988 (finals)
- Competitors: 62 from 47 nations
- Winning time: 1:02.04 NR

Medalists
| 1st place, gold medalist(s) | | Adrian Moorhouse | Great Britain |
| 2nd place, silver medalist(s) | | Károly Güttler | Hungary |
| 3rd place, bronze medalist(s) | | Dmitry Volkov | Soviet Union |

The men's 100 metre breaststroke event at the 1988 Summer Olympics took place between 18–19 September at the Jamsil Indoor Swimming Pool in Seoul, South Korea.

The winning margin was 0.01 seconds which as of 2023 remains the only time this event for men has been won at the Olympics by less than a tenth of a second.

== Records ==
Prior to this competition, the existing world and Olympic records were as follows.

| World record | Steve Lundquist (USA) | 1:01.65 | Los Angeles, United States | 29 July 1984 |
| Olympic record | Steve Lundquist (USA) | 1:01.65 | Los Angeles, United States | 29 July 1984 |

== Results ==
=== Heats ===
Rule: The eight fastest swimmers advance to final A (Q), while the next eight to final B (q).

| Rank | Heat | Name | Nationality | Time | Notes |
|---|---|---|---|---|---|
| 1 | 8 | Adrian Moorhouse | Great Britain | 1:02.19 | Q, NR |
| 2 | 6 | Victor Davis | Canada | 1:02.48 | Q |
| 3 | 8 | Dmitry Volkov | Soviet Union | 1:02.49 | Q |
| 4 | 8 | Károly Güttler | Hungary | 1:02.80 | Q |
| 5 | 7 | Gianni Minervini | Italy | 1:02.86 | Q |
| 6 | 8 | Christian Poswiat | East Germany | 1:02.99 | Q |
| 7 | 7 | Richard Schroeder | United States | 1:03.05 | Q |
| 8 | 7 | Ronald Dekker | Netherlands | 1:03.08 | QSO |
| 8 | 7 | Tamás Debnár | Hungary | 1:03.08 | QSO |
| 10 | 6 | Aleksey Matveyev | Soviet Union | 1:03.25 | q |
| 11 | 6 | Alexander Mayer | West Germany | 1:03.54 | q |
| 12 | 8 | Mark Warnecke | West Germany | 1:03.56 | q |
| 13 | 8 | Petri Suominen | Finland | 1:03.58 | q |
| 14 | 7 | Hironobu Nagahata | Japan | 1:04.02 | q |
| 15 | 6 | Daniel Watters | United States | 1:04.04 | q |
| 16 | 6 | Chen Jianhong | China | 1:04.09 | q |
| 17 | 6 | James Parrack | Great Britain | 1:04.23 | |
| 18 | 5 | Kenji Watanabe | Japan | 1:04.35 | |
| 19 | 7 | Pablo Restrepo | Colombia | 1:04.43 | |
| 20 | 7 | Raik Hannemann | East Germany | 1:04.46 | |
| 21 | 5 | Pierre-Yves Eberle | Switzerland | 1:04.53 | |
| 22 | 5 | Ian McAdam | Australia | 1:04.56 | |
| 22 | 5 | David Leblanc | France | 1:04.56 | |
| 24 | 4 | Tsai Hsin-yen | Chinese Taipei | 1:04.58 | |
| 25 | 4 | Radek Beinhauer | Czechoslovakia | 1:04.61 | |
| 26 | 3 | Yoon Joo-il | South Korea | 1:04.68 | |
| 27 | 7 | Étienne Dagon | Switzerland | 1:04.71 | |
| 28 | 6 | Alexander Marček | Czechoslovakia | 1:04.95 | |
| 29 | 8 | Thomas Böhm | Austria | 1:04.96 | |
| 30 | 5 | Jin Fu | China | 1:05.02 | |
| 31 | 8 | Cameron Grant | Canada | 1:05.10 | |
| 32 | 4 | Joaquín Fernández | Spain | 1:05.19 | |
| 33 | 3 | Sidney Appelboom | Belgium | 1:05.21 | |
| 34 | 4 | Gary O'Toole | Ireland | 1:05.34 | |
| 35 | 3 | Javier Careaga | Mexico | 1:05.37 | |
| 36 | 5 | Cédric Penicaud | France | 1:05.46 | |
| 37 | 5 | Cícero Tortelli | Brazil | 1:05.50 | |
| 38 | 6 | Jan-Erick Olsen | Norway | 1:05.54 | |
| 39 | 4 | Anthony Beks | New Zealand | 1:05.65 | |
| 40 | 2 | Alexandre Yokochi | Portugal | 1:05.68 | |
| 41 | 2 | Ng Yue Meng | Singapore | 1:05.87 | |
| 42 | 5 | Eyal Stigman | Israel | 1:05.92 | |
| 43 | 4 | Sergio López Miró | Spain | 1:06.08 | |
| 44 | 3 | Wirmandi Sugriat | Indonesia | 1:06.22 | |
| 45 | 3 | Luc van de Vondel | Belgium | 1:06.24 | |
| 46 | 4 | Richard Lockhart | New Zealand | 1:06.27 | |
| 47 | 4 | Nikolaos Fokianos | Greece | 1:06.30 | |
| 48 | 2 | Lars Sørensen | Denmark | 1:06.48 | |
| 49 | 3 | Manuel Gutiérrez | Panama | 1:06.73 | |
| 50 | 3 | Patrick Concepcion | Philippines | 1:06.74 | |
| 51 | 2 | Arnþór Ragnarsson | Iceland | 1:07.93 | |
| 52 | 2 | Watt Kam Sing | Hong Kong | 1:08.03 | |
| 53 | 3 | Victor Ruberry | Bermuda | 1:09.49 | |
| 54 | 2 | Quách Hoài Nam | Vietnam | 1:10.90 | |
| 55 | 2 | Kraig Singleton | Virgin Islands | 1:11.68 | |
| 56 | 1 | Michele Piva | San Marino | 1:13.94 | |
| 57 | 1 | Amine El-Domyati | Lebanon | 1:14.40 | |
| 58 | 2 | Bazlur Mohamed Rahman | Bangladesh | 1:14.97 | |
| 59 | 1 | Gaspar Fragata | Angola | 1:16.18 | |
| 60 | 1 | Obaid Al-Rumaithi | United Arab Emirates | 1:17.01 | |
| 61 | 1 | Vivaldo Fernandes | Angola | 1:17.98 | |
| | 1 | Trevor Ncala | Swaziland | DNS | |

==== Swimoff ====
| Rank | Lane | Name | Nationality | Time | Notes |
|---|---|---|---|---|---|
| 1 | 4 | Ronald Dekker | Netherlands | 1:02.63 | Q, WD* |
| 2 | 5 | Tamás Debnár | Hungary | 1:03.68 | Q |

* Opted to swim for the consolation final instead.

=== Finals ===
==== Final B ====
| Rank | Lane | Name | Nationality | Time | Notes |
|---|---|---|---|---|---|
| 9 | 5 | Aleksey Matveyev | Soviet Union | 1:03.01 | |
| 10 | 4 | Ronald Dekker | Netherlands | 1:03.22 | |
| 11 | 6 | Mark Warnecke | West Germany | 1:03.40 | |
| 12 | 3 | Alexander Mayer | West Germany | 1:03.85 | |
| 13 | 7 | Hironobu Nagahata | Japan | 1:03.89 | |
| 14 | 2 | Petri Suominen | Finland | 1:04.04 | |
| 15 | 1 | Daniel Watters | United States | 1:04.17 | |
| 16 | 8 | Chen Jianhong | China | 1:04.72 | |

==== Final A ====
| Rank | Lane | Name | Nationality | Time | Notes |
|---|---|---|---|---|---|
| 1st place, gold medalist(s) | 4 | Adrian Moorhouse | Great Britain | 1:02.04 | NR |
| 2nd place, silver medalist(s) | 6 | Károly Güttler | Hungary | 1:02.05 | |
| 3rd place, bronze medalist(s) | 3 | Dmitry Volkov | Soviet Union | 1:02.20 | |
| 4 | 5 | Victor Davis | Canada | 1:02.38 | |
| 5 | 8 | Tamás Debnár | Hungary | 1:02.50 | |
| 6 | 1 | Richard Schroeder | United States | 1:02.55 | |
| 7 | 2 | Gianni Minervini | Italy | 1:02.93 | |
| 8 | 7 | Christian Poswiat | East Germany | 1:03.43 | |
