= Swimming at the 1988 Summer Olympics – Men's 100 metre freestyle =

Men's 100 metre freestyle at the Games of the XXIV Olympiad
- Venue: Jamsil Indoor Swimming Pool
- Date: 22 September 1988 (heats & finals)
- Competitors: 77 from 51 nations
- Winning time: 48.63 OR

Medalists
1st place, gold medalist(s)		Matt Biondi	United States
2nd place, silver medalist(s)		Chris Jacobs	United States
3rd place, bronze medalist(s)		Stéphan Caron	France

The men's 100 metre freestyle event at the 1988 Summer Olympics took place on 22 September at the Jamsil Indoor Swimming Pool in Seoul, South Korea. There were 77 competitors from 51 nations. Nations had been limited to two swimmers each since the 1984 Games.

American Matt Biondi set a new Olympic record to claim his first ever individual gold and fourth medal in swimming at these Games (fifth in his career, with a relay gold in 1984). Maintaining a lead from start to finish, he pulled away from a star-studded field to hit the wall first in 48.63. Biondi also enjoyed his teammate Chris Jacobs taking home the silver in 49.08, as the Americans climbed on the top two steps of the podium for the sixth time in the event's Olympic history. Earlier in the prelims, Jacobs sliced off Rowdy Gaines' 1984 record by six-tenths of a second to establish a new Olympic standard of 49.20 in the eighth heat, until Biondi eventually lowered it to 49.04 in the final of ten heats. Meanwhile, France's Stéphan Caron held off an intense sprint battle against Soviet duo Gennadiy Prigoda and Iurie Başcatov to take home the bronze in 49.62.

== Background ==
This was the 20th appearance of the men's 100 metre freestyle. The event has been held at every Summer Olympics except 1900 (when the shortest freestyle was the 200 metres), though the 1904 version was measured in yards rather than metres.

Three of the eight finalists from the 1984 Games returned: two-time bronze medalist Per Johansson of Sweden, fifth-place finisher Dano Halsall of Switzerland, and sixth-place finisher Stéphan Caron of France. Caron was also the runner-up in the 1986 world championships behind Matt Biondi of the United States.

Biondi had come to Seoul with the goal of matching Mark Spitz's seven gold medals in a single Games. That goal had already been frustrated by the time of the 100 metre freestyle (his best race), as his first three events had resulted in only one golds along with a silver and a bronze. Biondi still had an excellent chance of achieving as many gold medals (5) as anyone not named Spitz had before 1988, however, with the 100 free, 50 free, and two relays to go, though Kristin Otto was on her way towards 6 golds in Seoul as well.

Guam, Senegal, the United Arab Emirates, and Uruguay each made their debut in the event. The United States made its 19th appearance, most of any nation, having missed only the boycotted 1980 Games.

== Competition format ==
This freestyle swimming competition used the A/B final format instituted in 1984. The competition consisted of two rounds: heats and finals. The swimmers with the best 8 times in the semifinals advanced to the A final, competing for medals through 8th place. The swimmers with the next 8 times in the semifinals competed in the B final for 9th through 16th place. Swim-offs were used as necessary to determine advancement.

== Records ==
Prior to this competition, the existing world and Olympic records were as follows.

World record	Matt Biondi (USA)	48.42	Austin, United States	10 August 1988
Olympic record	Rowdy Gaines (USA)	49.80	Los Angeles, United States	31 July 1984

The following records were established during the competition:

Date	Round	Swimmer	Nation	Time	Record
22 September	Heat 8	Chris Jacobs	United States	49.20	OR
22 September	Heat 10	Matt Biondi	United States	49.04	OR
22 September	Final A	Matt Biondi	United States	48.63	OR

== Schedule ==
All times are Korea Standard Time adjusted for daylight savings (UTC+10)

Date	Time	Round
Thursday, 22 September 1988	10:00; 20:00	Heats; Finals

== Results ==
=== Heats ===
Rule: The eight fastest swimmers advance to final A, while the next eight to final B.

Rank	Heat	Swimmer	Nation	Time	Notes
1	10	Matt Biondi	United States	49.04	QA, OR
2	8	Chris Jacobs	United States	49.20	QA
3	9	Stéphan Caron	France	49.37	QA
4	9	Iurie Başcatov	Soviet Union	50.08	QA
5	10	Gennadiy Prigoda	Soviet Union	50.13	QA
6	8	Per Johansson	Sweden	50.22	QA
7	9	Andrew Baildon	Australia	50.34	QA
8	8	Tommy Werner	Sweden	50.45	QA
9	10	Steffen Zesner	East Germany	50.73	QB, WD
10	7	Hilton Woods	Netherlands Antilles	50.73	QB
11	8	Franz Mortensen	Denmark	50.74	QB
12	8	Sven Lodziewski	East Germany	50.77	QB
13	9	Thomas Fahrner	West Germany	50.78	QB
14	10	Sandy Goss	Canada	50.81	QB
15	9	Tsvetan Golomeev	Bulgaria	50.82	QB
16	9	Tom Stachewicz	Australia	50.90	QB
17	10	Stéfan Voléry	Switzerland	50.96	QB
18	8	Roberto Gleria	Italy	50.97	
19	9	Torsten Wiegel	West Germany	51.02	
20	9	Christophe Kalfayan	France	51.05	
21	10	Andy Jameson	Great Britain	51.18	
22	8	Roland Lee	Great Britain	51.20	
23	7	Dano Halsall	Switzerland	51.21	
24	4	Manuel Guzmán	Puerto Rico	51.25	
25	7	Peter Rohde	Denmark	51.38	
26	10	Petr Kladiva	Czechoslovakia	51.39	
27	10	Shen Jianqiang	China	51.40	
28	7	Rodrigo González	Mexico	51.46	
29	7	Hans Kroes	Netherlands	51.65	
30	7	Patrick Dybiona	Netherlands	51.79	
31	6	Magnús Ólafsson	Iceland	52.01	
32	5	Shigeo Ogata	Japan	52.08	
33	6	Jorge Fernandes	Brazil	52.23	
34	6	Jean-Marie Arnould	Belgium	52.26	
35	6	Yves Clausse	Luxembourg	52.27	
36	7	Ross Anderson	New Zealand	52.33	
37	6	Emanuel Nascimento	Brazil	52.41	
38	6	Feng Qiangbiao	China	52.45	
39	5	Carlos Scanavino	Uruguay	52.52	
40	6	Ang Peng Siong	Singapore	52.53	
41	5	Markus Opatril	Austria	52.66	
42	8	Mihály Richárd Bodor	Hungary	52.77	
43	3	Oon Jin Gee	Singapore	53.26	
44	5	Murat Tahir	Turkey	53.27	
45	4	Moustafa Amer	Egypt	53.57	
46	5	Vaughan Smith	Zimbabwe	53.58	
47	5	Richard Sam Bera	Indonesia	53.59	
48	1	Garvin Ferguson	Bahamas	53.62	
49	4	Michael Wright	Hong Kong	53.64	
50	4	Li Khai Kam	Hong Kong	53.70	
51	4	René Concepcion	Philippines	53.84	
52	5	Hakan Eskioğlu	Turkey	53.95	
53	4	Jonathan Sakovich	Guam	54.24	
54	3	Hans Foerster	Virgin Islands	54.29	
55	3	Kwon Sang-won	South Korea	54.34	
56	5	Ignacio Escamilla	Mexico	54.56	
57	3	Song Kwang-sun	South Korea	54.63	
58	3	Ronald Pickard	Virgin Islands	54.72	
59	2	Mouhamed Diop	Senegal	54.93	
60	3	Graham Thompson	Zimbabwe	55.20	
61	1	Paul Yelle	Barbados	55.35	
62	3	Pedro Lima	Angola	55.53	
63	4	Chiang Chi-li	Chinese Taipei	55.87	
64	2	Plutarco Castellanos	Honduras	56.11	
65	3	Hasan Al-Shammari	Kuwait	56.44	
66	2	Warren Sorby	Fiji	56.66	
67	1	Sergio Fafitine	Mozambique	57.10	
68	2	Pablo Barahona	Honduras	57.97	
69	2	Michele Piva	San Marino	57.99	
70	1	Jason Chute	Fiji	58.14	
71	2	Filippo Piva	San Marino	58.39	
72	1	Mohamed Bin Abid	United Arab Emirates	58.81	
73	2	Ahmad Faraj	United Arab Emirates	59.10	
74	2	Trevor Ncala	Swaziland	59.25	
75	1	Emile Lahoud	Lebanon	1:02.40	
76	1	Yul Mark Du Pont	Swaziland	1:02.70	
—	6	Stefan Opatril	Austria	DSQ	
—	7	Giorgio Lamberti	Italy	DNS	

=== Finals ===
==== Final B ====
Rank	Lane	Swimmer	Nation	Time
9	1	Tom Stachewicz	Australia	50.71
10	2	Sandy Goss	Canada	50.73
11	8	Stéfan Voléry	Switzerland	50.74
12	3	Sven Lodziewski	East Germany	51.00
13	5	Franz Mortensen	Denmark	51.05
14	6	Thomas Fahrner	West Germany	51.12
15	7	Tsvetan Golomeev	Bulgaria	51.16
16	4	Hilton Woods	Netherlands Antilles	51.25

==== Final A ====
Rank	Lane	Swimmer	Nation	Time	Notes
1st place, gold medalist(s)	4	Matt Biondi	United States	48.63	OR
2nd place, silver medalist(s)	5	Chris Jacobs	United States	49.08	
3rd place, bronze medalist(s)	3	Stéphan Caron	France	49.62	
4	2	Gennadiy Prigoda	Soviet Union	49.75	
5	6	Iurie Başcatov	Soviet Union	50.08	
6	1	Andrew Baildon	Australia	50.23	
7	7	Per Johansson	Sweden	50.35	
8	8	Tommy Werner	Sweden	50.54	
