= Swimming at the 1987 Pan American Games – Men's 100 metre backstroke =

Men's 100 metre backstroke at the 1987 Pan American Games
- Venue: Indiana University Natatorium
- Dates: August 14 (preliminaries and finals)
- Competitors: from - nations

Medalists
Gold medal	Andrew Gill	United States
Silver medal	David Berkoff	United States
Bronze medal	Alejandro Alvizuri	Peru

The men's 100 metre backstroke competition of the swimming events at the 1987 Pan American Games took place on 14 August at the Indiana University Natatorium. The last Pan American Games champion was Rick Carey of US.

This race consisted of two lengths of the pool, all in backstroke.

== Results ==
All times are in minutes and seconds.

KEY:	q	Fastest non-qualifiers	Q	Qualified	GR	Games record	NR	National record	PB	Personal best	SB	Seasonal best

=== Final ===
The final was held on August 14.

Rank	Name	Nationality	Time	Notes
1st place, gold medalist(s)	Andrew Gill	United States	56.56	
2nd place, silver medalist(s)	David Berkoff	United States	57.35	
3rd place, bronze medalist(s)	Alejandro Alvizuri	Peru	58.65	
4	Ray Brown	Canada	58.66	
5	Gary Vandermeulen	Canada	58.91	
6	Manuel Guzmán	Puerto Rico	59.24	
7	Ernesto Vela	Mexico	59.83	
8	Rene Saez	Cuba	1:00.68	
