= Swimming at the Friendship Games =

Swimming at the Friendship Games took place at the Swimming Pool at the Olimpiysky Sports Complex in Moscow, Soviet Union between 19 August and 25 August 1984. 29 events (15 men's and 14 women's) were contested.

== Medal summary ==
=== Men's events ===
Event	Gold		Silver		Bronze	
100 m freestyle	Sergey Smiriagin (URS)	50.26	Aleksey Markovsky (URS)	50.39	Sven Lodziewski (GDR)	50.58
200 m freestyle	Sven Lodziewski (GDR)	1:49.83	Vladimir Shemetov (URS)	1:50.33	Sergey Krasyuk (URS)	1:51.09
400 m freestyle	Vladimir Salnikov (URS)	3:49.27	Sven Lodziewski (GDR)	3:50.98	Sviatoslav Semenov (URS)	3:53.34
1500 m freestyle	Vladimir Salnikov (URS)	15:03.51	Uwe Dassler (GDR)	15:11.14	Sviatoslav Semenov (URS)	15:25.56
100 m backstroke	Dirk Richter (GDR)	55.67	Vladimir Shemetov (URS)	55.88	Frank Baltrusch (GDR)	56.39
200 metre backstroke	Sergei Zabolotnov (URS)	1:58.41 (WR)	Vladimir Shemetov (URS)	1:59.54	Dirk Richter (GDR)	2:00.30
100 metre breaststroke	Dmitry Volkov (URS)	1:03.72	Robertas Žulpa (URS)	1:03.87	Sigurd Hanke (GDR)	1:05.16
200 metre breaststroke	Robertas Žulpa (URS)	2:15.70	Dmitry Volkov (URS)	2:16.97	Albán Vermes (HUN)	2:21.19
100 metre butterfly	Aleksey Markovsky (URS)	54.26	Alexandr Prigoda (URS)	55.08	Marcel Géry (TCH)	55.17
200 metre butterfly	Alexandr Prigoda (URS)	1:58.83	Sergey Fesenko, Sr. (URS)	1:59.52	Marcel Géry (TCH)	2:00.34
200 metre individual medley	Jens-Peter Berndt (GDR)	2:02.51	Josef Hladký (TCH)	2:03.33	Aleksandr Sidorenko (URS)	2:03.35
400 metre individual medley	Jens-Peter Berndt (GDR)	4:18.29	Sergey Pichugin (URS)	4:25.19	Josef Hladký (TCH)	4:26.29
4×100 m freestyle relay	Soviet Union (URS); Sergey Smiriagin; Sergey Kurbatov; Sergey Krasyuk; Aleksey Markovsky	3:20.19	East Germany (GDR); Dirk Richter; Rene Wanzlik; Sven Lodziewski; Reiner Sternal	3:22.92	Czechoslovakia (TCH); Jarmil Proněk; Petr Kladiva; Josef Hladký; Marcel Géry	3:27.31
4×200 m freestyle relay	East Germany (GDR); Dirk Richter; Steffen Liess; Reiner Sternal; Sven Lodziewski	7:20.78	Soviet Union (URS); Vladimir Shemetov; Andrei Liashenko; Vladimir Salnikov; Sergey Krasyuk	7:22.31	Czechoslovakia (TCH); Martin Dvořák; Petr Kladiva; Josef Hladký; Marcel Géry	7:24.78
4×100 m medley relay	Soviet Union (URS); Vladimir Shemetov; Dmitry Volkov; Aleksey Markovsky; Sergey Smiriagin	3:42.15	East Germany (GDR); Dirk Richter; Sigurd Hanke; Tino Ott; Sven Lodziewski	3:43.23	Czechoslovakia (TCH); Josef Hladký; Petr Matoušek; Petr Kladiva; Marcel Géry	3:43.25

=== Women's events ===
Event	Gold		Silver		Bronze	
100 m freestyle	Kristin Otto (GDR)	55.75	Birgit Meineke (GDR)	55.79	Svitlana Kopchykova (URS)	56.53
200 m freestyle	Kristin Otto (GDR)	1:59.48	Birgit Meineke (GDR)	2:00.15	Svitlana Kopchykova (URS)	2:00.47
400 m freestyle	Astrid Strauss (GDR)	4:07.66	Irina Laricheva (URS)	4:09.70	Anke Sonnenbrodt (GDR)	4:16.21
800 m freestyle	Astrid Strauss (GDR)	8:24.95	Grit Richter (GDR)	8:33.47	Irina Laricheva (URS)	8:39.57
100 m backstroke	Ina Kleber (GDR)	1:00.99	Kristin Otto (GDR)	1:02.02	Viktoriya Klochko (URS)	1:03.67
200 m backstroke	Katrin Zimmermann (GDR)	2:12.56	Yelena Dendeberova (URS)	2:13.31	Kristin Otto (GDR)	2:15.16
100 m breaststroke	Sylvia Gerasch (GDR)	1:08.29 (WR)	Ute Geweniger (GDR)	1:08.59	Larisa Byelokon (URS)	1:09.63
200 metre breaststroke	Larisa Byelokon (URS)	2:29.13	Sylvia Gerasch (GDR)	2:29.62	Yelena Volkova (URS)	2:32.36
100 metre butterfly	Tatyana Kurnikova (URS)	59.41	Ines Geißler (GDR)	1:00.09	Yelena Osadchuk (URS)	1:01.33
200 m butterfly	Ines Geißler (GDR)	2:09.96	Yelena Osadchuk (URS)	2:11.76	Tatyana Kurnikova (URS)	2:12.41
200 m individual medley	Ute Geweniger (GDR)	2:11.79	Yelena Dendeberova (URS)	2:14.56	Svitlana Kopchykova (URS)	2:15.40
400 m individual medley	Yelena Dendeberova (URS)	4:43.78	Kathleen Nord (GDR)	4:49.49	Sonia Blagova (BUL)	4:52.35
4×100 m freestyle relay	East Germany (GDR); Kristin Otto; Caren Cönig; Heike Friedrich; Birgit Meineke	3:42.41 (WR)	Soviet Union (URS); Svitlana Kopchykova; Svetlana Didienko; Tatyana Kurnikova; Yelena Dendeberova	3:44.31	Hungary (HUN); Edit Ormos; Katalin Nagy; Ágnes Fodor; Andrea Orosz	3:55.42
4×100 m medley relay	East Germany (GDR); Ina Kleber; Sylvia Gerasch; Ines Geißler; Birgit Meineke	4:03.69 (WR)	Soviet Union (URS); Viktoriya Klochko; Larisa Byelokon; Tatyana Kurnikova; Svitlana Kopchykova	4:08.13	Bulgaria (BUL); Bistra Gospodinova; Tanya Bogomilova; Radosveta Pironkova; Vanja Argirova	4:16.74

== World records broken ==
Five new world records were set.

=== Men's ===
Event	Name	Nationality	Result
Men's 200 metre backstroke	Sergei Zabolotnov	Soviet Union	1:58.41

=== Women's ===
Event	Name	Nationality	Result
Women's 100 m backstroke	Ina Kleber	East Germany	1:00.59
Women's 100 m breaststroke	Sylvia Gerasch	East Germany	1:08.29
Women's 4×100 m freestyle relay	Kristin Otto; Caren König; Heike Friedrich; Birgit Meineke	East Germany	3:42.41
Women's 4×100 m medley relay	Ina Kleber; Sylvia Gerasch; Ines Geißler; Birgit Meineke	East Germany	4:03.69

== Medal table ==
* Host nation (Soviet Union)

Rank	Nation	Gold	Silver	Bronze	Total
1	East Germany (GDR)	16	12	6	34
2	Soviet Union (URS)*	13	16	13	42
3	Czechoslovakia (TCH)	0	1	6	7
4	Bulgaria (BUL)	0	0	2	2
4	Hungary (HUN)	0	0	2	2
Totals (5 entries)		29	29	29	87

== See also ==
- Swimming at the 1984 Summer Olympics
