= Prigoda =

Prigoda (Russian: Пригода) is a Russian surname. Notable people with the surname include:

- Alexandr Prigoda (born 1964), Russian Soviet swimmer
- Gennadiy Prigoda (born 1965), Russian Soviet swimmer
- Sergei Prigoda (1957–2017), Russian football manager and Soviet footballer
