= Chris Jacobs (swimmer) =

American swimmer (born 1964)

Personal information
- Full name: Christopher Charles Jacobs
- Nickname: "Chris"
- National team: United States
- Born: September 25, 1964 (age 61) Livingston, New Jersey, U.S.
- Height: 6 ft 5 in (1.96 m)
- Weight: 181 lb (82 kg)
- Spouse: Marie Sheehan (1992 - 2006)

Sport
- Sport: Swimming
- Strokes: Freestyle
- College team: University of Texas
Medal record
Men's swimming
Representing United States
Olympic Games
Gold medal – first place	1988 Seoul	4×100 m freestyle
Gold medal – first place	1988 Seoul	4×100 m medley
Silver medal – second place	1988 Seoul	100 m freestyle
Pan Pacific Championships
Gold medal – first place	1987 Brisbane	4×100 m freestyle

Christopher Charles Jacobs (born September 25, 1964) is an American former competition swimmer, two-time Olympic champion, and former world record-holder.

== Early life and education ==
Jacobs was born in Livingston, New Jersey, and attended Newark Academy. He was a member of the Texas Longhorns swimming and diving team. Jacobs suffered from shoulder pain and struggled with drug and alcohol addiction as a college student and dropped out during his junior year. After completing a rehabilitation program in New Jersey, he returned to the University of Texas and resumed his swimming career.

== Career ==
Jacobs won two gold medals and a silver while representing the United States at the 1988 Summer Olympics in Seoul, South Korea. He received his first gold medal as the lead swimmer for the winning U.S. team in the men's 4×100-meter freestyle relay, together with teammates Troy Dalbey, Tom Jager and Matt Biondi. The four Americans set a new world record of 3:16.53 in the event final. He then won another gold medal swimming the anchor freestyle leg of the men's 4×100-meter medley relay for the first-place U.S. team of David Berkoff (backstroke), Richard Schroeder (breaststroke), and Matt Biondi (butterfly). Jacobs and the medley relay team set another new world record of 3:36.93. Individually, he received a silver medal for his second-place performance in the men's 100-meter freestyle event, finishing in 49.08 seconds.

Jacobs is commonly credited as one of the first athletes to obtain an Olympic tattoo, following his performance in the 1988 Seoul Games. The tattoo of the five interlocking Olympic rings has since become common among athletes to represent their participation in the games.

== See also ==
- List of Olympic medalists in swimming (men)
- List of University of Texas at Austin alumni
- World record progression 4 × 100 metres freestyle relay
- World record progression 4 × 100 metres medley relay
