= Richard Schroeder =

American swimmer (born 1961)

Personal information
- Full name: Richard Alan Schroeder
- Nickname: "Rich"
- National team: United States
- Born: October 29, 1961 (age 65)
- Height: 6 ft 0 in (1.83 m)
- Weight: 174 lb (79 kg)
- Spouse: Dawn
- Children: 2

Sport
- Sport: Swimming
- Strokes: Breaststroke
- Club: Santa Barbara Swim Club; Pre-Olympic training
- College team: College of the Sequoias (COS); U. Cal, Santa Barbara
- Coach: Bruce Montgomery (COS); Gregg Wilson, Tom Chasson (UCSB)
Medal record
Men's swimming
Representing the United States
Olympic Games
Gold medal – first place	1984 Los Angeles	4x100 m medley
Gold medal – first place	1988 Seoul	4x100 m medley
Pan Pacific Championships
Gold medal – first place	1987 Brisbane	4x100 m medley
Silver medal – second place	1987 Brisbane	100 m breaststroke
Silver medal – second place	1989 Tokyo	100 m breaststroke

Richard Alan Schroeder (born October 29, 1961) is an American former competition swimmer who competed for the University of California Santa Barbara as a breaststroke specialist and was an Olympic gold medalist in the 4x100 Medley relay both in 1984 Olympics in Los Angeles, United States, and in 1988 Olympics in Seoul, South Korea.

Schroeder was born October 29, 1961 and competed in swimming from an early age in greater Lindsay, California. Competing as a swimmer in grade school he won the 25-yard backstroke and placed third in the 25-yard butterfly around the age of 8 at the Fresno Dolphin Swim meet.

Excelling in freestyle competition as well as stroke, he swam for Lindsey California's, Lindsay High School of the East Yosemite League, which has since closed. Possessing speed, he played receiver for Lindsay High football and also competed on their basketball team. In 1979, he won the 50 freestyle swimming for Lindsay High with a competitive time of 22.6. He graduated Lindsay High in June of 1980.

== College era swimming ==
=== College of the Sequoias ===
Schroeder swam briefly for the College of the Sequoias Swim team under Coach Bruce Montgomery where he was honored as a Junior College All American in the breaststroke. Montgomery believed Schroeder benefitted from the weight training he did training for football at Lindsay High School, and continued with limited and focused strength training at College of the Sequoias. In 1981, Schroeder placed second in the 100 breaststroke at the California State Competition. At the Redwood Eastern Invitational in April, 1980, Schroeder won the 22.75 in the 50 freestyle and won the 100 backstroke with a time of 1:06.15. At College of the Sequoias by 1982, he set records in the 1000-meter freestyle with a time of 10:12.9 and in the 50 freesytle with a time of 22.1.

=== University of California Santa Barbara ===
Schroeder then swam for Hall of Fame Head Coach Gregg Wilson and Coach Tom Chasson at the University of California Santa Barbara graduating around 1986. He swam for UC Santa Barbara from 1981-1985, and earned All American status in the 100 and 200 breaststroke in the years 1983 and 1985. He earned a Big West Conference title in the 100 breaststroke in 1985, his Senior year. The U Cal Santa Barbara swim team won the Big West Conference title all four years Schroeder swam for the team. At the 1985 NCAA championships, a disappointing performance led him to a temporary retirement from elite swim training and competition.

Schroeder was considered among the ten fastest swimmers in the world in the 100 breaststroke between 1983-1990.

He married Dawn Schroeder whom he met while at the University of California Santa Barbara. Dawn also swam for UC Santa Barbara, and later taught Elementary School in Goleta, California. Schroeder's son Grant played Water Polo for two years and was on the Triathlon team at UC Berkeley where he won the University medal for academics, and his research in Biology. Schroeder's younger daughter Erica participated in Track and Field at the University of Washington.

== Olympics ==
Though he had the slowest times in the qualifying heats for the event, Schroder qualified for U.S. Olympic team by finishing first in the 1984 Olympic trials in Indianapolis at the University of Indiana of Perdue University pool in the 200-meter breaststroke. He clinched his Olympic berth with a first place time of 2:17.64 in the finals, finishing just ahead of American breaststroker John Moffett by only .02 seconds.

=== 1984 Olympics ===
Schroeder represented the United States at the 1984 Summer Olympics in Los Angeles, California and earned a gold medal by swimming the breaststroke leg for the winning U.S. team in the third preliminary heat of the men's 4×100-meter medley relay that swam a combined time of 3:44.33, with Schroder swimming backstroke leg in a time of 1:02.66. The finals team swam a 3:39.30, though Schroeder did not swim in the finals. At the 1984 Olympics, he also competed in the men's 200-meter breaststroke, finishing fourth in the final with a time of 2:18.03.

=== 1988 Olympics ===
Schroeder represented the United States at the 1988 Summer Olympics in Seoul, South Korea. He won a gold medal swimming the breaststroke leg in the final of the men's 4×100-meter medley relay for the winning U.S. team that had a first place time of 3:36.93, with Schroder swimming his breaststroke leg in 1:01.64. Schroeder swam with the team of David Berkoff, Matt Biondi, and Chris Jacobs. Their time for the Medley relay in the Olympics that year set a world and olympic record. Schroeder finished sixth in the final of the men's 100-meter breaststroke event with a time of 1:02.55.

=== International competition ===
Schroeder competed at the Pan Pacific Games. In the 100 breaststroke, he captured silver medals in the 100 breaststroke in 1987 and 1989. He took first place and won a gold medal in the 1987 medley relay. Significantly he won the 1987 US title in 1987 in the 100 breaststroke. He placed second at the U.S. championships in the 100 breaststroke in 1984 and 1988.

In 1987, he worked as an accountant for Price Waterhouse in San Francisco, before making the decision to train for the 1988 Olympics. He trained in April, 1988 with the Santa Barbara Swim Club under former coach Tom Chasson.

After retiring from elite competitive swimming, Schroeder swam for fitness and recreation with United States Masters swimming. In August 2012, swimming in the 50-54 age group, he set two Masters age group records, at the Southern Pacific Master's Long Course Championships. Swimming for the Master's team of UC-Santa Barbara in the 100 breaststroke, he recorded a time of 1:09.23 going just under the former world record of 1:09.36. In the 50 breaststroke he swam a time of 30.88 in the 50 breast going just under the former age-group world record of 30.97. He also competed very favorably in backstroke events in US Masters meets, formerly breaking the world record for the 200 backstroke for the age group 45-59.

=== Honors ===
Shroeder was inducted into the UC Santa Barbara Athletic Hall of Fame.

== See also ==
- List of Olympic medalists in swimming (men)
