= Konstantin Petrov =

Kazakhstani swimmer (born 1964)

Personal information
- Born: 16 January 1964 (age 62) Alma-Ata, Kazakh SSR, Soviet Union
- Height: 1.85 m (6 ft 1 in)
- Weight: 81 kg (179 lb)

Sport
- Sport: Swimming
- Club: Dynamo Almaty
Medal record
Representing Soviet Union
Summer Olympics
Bronze medal – third place	1988 Seoul	4×100 m medley
European Championships
Gold medal – first place	1987 Strasbourg	4×100 m medley

Konstantin Yuryevich Petrov (Russian: Константин Юрьевич Петров; born 16 January 1964) is a retired Kazakhstani butterfly swimmer. He won a bronze medal at the 1988 Summer Olympics and a gold medal at the 1987 European Aquatics Championships in the 4 × 100 m medley relay.
