= Swimming at the 1987 Summer Universiade =

Swimming at the XIV Summer Universiade
- Dates: 9 July 1987 – 14 July 1987

The swimming competition at the 1987 Summer Universiade took place in Zagreb, Yugoslavia from July 9 to July 14, 1987.

== Men's events ==
Event	Gold		Silver		Bronze	
50 m freestyle	Tom Williams; United States	22.90	Hans Kroes; Netherlands	23.11	Stephan Guesgen; West Germany	23.35
100 m freestyle	Andy Jameson; Great Britain	51.42	Patrick Dybiona; Netherlands	51.70	Hans Kroes; Netherlands	51.83
200 m freestyle	Frank Drost; Netherlands	1:51.62	Jeffrey Olsen; United States	1:51.95	Joseph Parker; United States	1:52.14
400 m freestyle	Andrey Patrakov; Soviet Union	3:56.13	Darjan Petrič; Yugoslavia	3:56.57	Kevin Boyd; Great Britain	3:56.62
1500 m freestyle	Alex Miawsky; United States	15:23.22	Darjan Petrič; Yugoslavia	15:26.60	Rod Kirschenman; United States	15:26.62
100 m backstroke	Daichi Suzuki; Japan	56.57	David Berkoff; United States	57.22	Jay Mortenson; United States	57.44
200 m backstroke	Daichi Suzuki; Japan	2:02.98	Zoltan Balajti; Hungary	2:03.95	Michael Lambert; United States	2:04.14
100 m breaststroke	Lorenzo Carbonari; Italy	1:04.20	Andrew Deichert; United States	1:04.96	Naritochi Matsuda; Japan	1:05.00
200 m breaststroke	Alexandre Yokochi; Portugal	2:18.24	Todd Torres; United States	2:21.40	Dimitri Porotski; Soviet Union	2:21.76
100 m butterfly	Andy Jameson; Great Britain	54.65	Anthony Mosse; New Zealand	54.73	David Cademartori; United States	54.87
200 m butterfly	Anthony Mosse; New Zealand	2:00.20	David Cademartori; United States	2:01.52	Ondrej Bures; Czechoslovakia	2:02.27
200 m individual medley	Neil Cochran; Great Britain	2:05.08	Rob Woodhouse; Australia	2:05.40	David Cademartori; United States	2:06.04
400 m individual medley	Rob Woodhouse; Australia	4:22.90	Serghei Mariniuc; Soviet Union	4:25.77	Shawn Rowland; United States	4:26.23
4 × 100 m freestyle relay	United States (USA); Eric Hansen; David Kerska; Tom Williams; Joel Thomas	3:23.56	Netherlands (NED)	3:24.02	West Germany (FRG)	3:26.08
4 × 200 m freestyle relay	United States (USA); Joe Parker; Brent Lang; John Hodge; Jeffrey Olsen	7:29.30	Netherlands (NED)	7:29.86	Great Britain (GBR)	7:31.95
4 × 100 m medley relay	United States (USA); David Berkoff; Todd Torres; Jay Mortenson; Eric Hansen	3:45.72	Japan (JPN)	3:46.27	West Germany (FRG)	3:48.73

Legend: CR – Championship record; NR – National record

== Women's events ==
Event	Gold		Silver		Bronze	
50 m freestyle	Ann Drolsom; United States	26.24	Marie-Thérèse Armentero; Switzerland	26.56	Conny van Bentum; Netherlands	26.57
100 m freestyle	Mitzi Kremer; United States	57.30	Conny van Bentum; Netherlands	57.47	Mildred Muis; Netherlands	57.56
200 m freestyle	Noemi Lung; Romania	2:00.89	Mitzi Kremer; United States	2:01.84	Silvia Persi; Italy	2:03.68
400 m freestyle	Noemi Lung; Romania	4:10.84	Mitzi Kremer; United States	4:12.18	Lisa Meyers; United States	4:18.86
800 m freestyle	Noemi Lung; Romania	8:34.82	Cheryl Kriegsman; United States	8:41.18	Yan Ming; China	8:46.10
100 m backstroke	Aneta Patrascoiu; Romania	1:02.92	Susan O'Brien; United States	1:03.77	Jolanda de Rover; Netherlands	1:03.92
200 m backstroke	Aneta Patrascoiu; Romania	2:13.06	Jolanda de Rover; Netherlands	2:17.08	Jennifer Shannon; United States	2:17.20
100 m breaststroke	Manuela Dalla Valle; Italy	1:10.54	Ingrid Lempereur; Belgium	1:11.37	Susannah Brownsdon; Great Britain	1:11.86
200 m breaststroke	Ingrid Lempereur; Belgium	2:31.09	Manuela Dalla Valle; Italy	2:31.75	Larisa Moreva; Soviet Union	2:32.87
100 m butterfly	Ilaria Tocchini; Italy	1:02.01	Conny van Bentum; Netherlands	1:02.13	Jodi Eyles; United States	1:02.25
200 m butterfly	Elizabeth Roussaki; Greece	2:12.59	Aneta Patrascoiu; Romania	2:14.26	Noemi Lung; Romania	2:14.74
200 m individual medley	Noemi Lung; Romania	2:15.64	Mildred Muis; Netherlands	2:18.21	Marianne Muis; Netherlands	2:18.31
400 m individual medley	Noemi Lung; Romania	4:42.95	Aneta Patrascoiu; Romania	4:50.75	Janelie Bosse; United States	4:52.98
4 × 100 m freestyle relay	Netherlands (NED)	3:47.94	United States (USA)	3:48.56	Italy (ITA)	3:52.97
4 × 200 m freestyle relay	United States (USA); Francie O'Leary; Lisa Meyers; Cheryl Kriegsman; Mitzi Kremer	8:09.50	Netherlands (NED)	8:17.51	Romania (ROM)	8:21.50
4 × 100 m medley relay	United States (USA); Susan O'Brien; Kim Rhodenbaugh; Jodi Eyles; Aimee Berzins	4:14.38	Italy (ITA)	4:14.57	Netherlands (NED)	4:15.10

Legend: CR – Championship record; NR – National record

== Medal table ==
Rank	Nation	Gold	Silver	Bronze	Total
1	United States (USA)	9	10	11	30
2	Romania (ROU)	7	2	2	11
3	Italy (ITA)	3	2	2	7
4	Great Britain (GBR)	3	0	3	6
5	Netherlands (NED)	2	7	6	15
6	Japan (JPN)	2	1	1	4
7	Soviet Union (URS)	1	1	2	4
8	Australia (AUS)	1	1	0	2
8	Belgium (BEL)	1	1	0	2
8	New Zealand (NZL)	1	1	0	2
11	Greece (GRE)	1	0	0	1
11	Portugal (POR)	1	0	0	1
13	France (FRA)	0	2	0	2
13	Yugoslavia (YUG)	0	2	0	2
15	Hungary (HUN)	0	1	0	1
15	Switzerland (SUI)	0	1	0	1
17	West Germany (FRG)	0	0	3	3
18	China (CHN)	0	0	1	1
18	Czechoslovakia (TCH)	0	0	1	1
Totals (19 entries)		32	32	32	96
