= Pablo Barahona =

Honduran swimmer (born 1970)

Personal information
- Full name: Pablo Rodolfo Barahona
- Born: 10 April 1970 (age 56)

Sport
- Sport: Swimming

Pablo Rodolfo Barahona (born 10 April 1970) is a Honduran swimmer. Competing for Honduras internationally, he represented Honduras at the 1988 Summer Olympics. There, he competed in the men's 50 metre freestyle, men's 100 metre freestyle, men's 100 metre backstroke, and men's 200 metre backstroke. He did not make it past the qualifying heats of any of the events.

== Biography ==
Pablo Rodolfo Barahona was born on 10 April 1970. As a swimmer, he represented Honduras in international competition. Barahona was selected to compete for Honduras at the 1988 Summer Olympics held in Seoul, South Korea. For the 1988 Summer Games, he was selected to compete in four events: the men's 50 metre freestyle, men's 100 metre freestyle, men's 100 metre backstroke, and men's 200 metre backstroke.

He first competed in the qualifying heats of the men's 100 metre freestyle on 22 September 1988 in the second heat against seven other swimmers. There, he recorded a time of 57.97 seconds and placed fourth, failing to advance to the finals of the event. He then competed in the qualifying heats of the men's 200 metre backstroke held on the same day in the first heat against four other swimmers. There, he recorded a time of 2:21.61 and placed second, failing to advance to the finals of the event. His third event was the men's 50 metre freestyle, competing in the second qualifying heat against seven other swimmers. There, he recorded a time of 25.79 seconds and placed second, failing to advance to the finals of the event. His last event was the men's 100 metre backstroke, competing in the second qualifying heat against seven other swimmers. There, he recorded a time of 1:03.90 and placed seventh, again failing to advance to the finals of the event.
