= Olympic tattoo =

Athletic tradition of body art

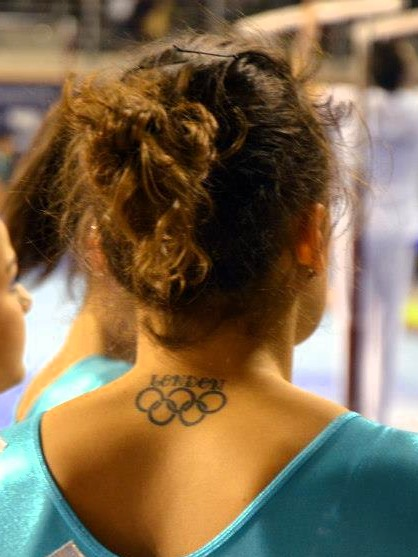
An Olympic tattoo on the neck of gymnast Elisabetta Preziosa, who competed in the 2012 Summer Olympics in London.

Olympic tattoos are a tradition among athletes who compete in the Olympic Games of tattooing the Olympic rings symbol. The practice dates back to at least the 1980s, when swimmer Chris Jacobs received a tattoo of the rings to commemorate his participation in the 1988 Summer Olympics. The Olympic tattoo has since become common practice among individuals who compete in the Games. Cited reasons for the tattoo usually include a signal of status as an Olympian, a personal reminder of success, and a show of camaraderie with teammates. While the tattoos are typically done by athletes who compete in the Games, others may sometimes obtain the artwork, such as parents of athletes.

== History ==
=== Origin ===
The interlocking rings symbolizing the Olympic Games, and later featured in the tattoo, were proposed by Pierre de Coubertin in 1913 and first used in the 1920 Summer Olympics in Antwerp, Belgium. Around six decades later, in the 1980s, the rings began appearing in tattoos. The American swimmer Chris Jacobs is commonly credited as the first individual to receive the Olympic tattoo. Jacobs reported feeling inspired after seeing a tattoo of the Canadian Gold Maple Leaf on a fellow swimmer. The Olympic tattoo became popular among American swimmers and then broadly adopted by members of other sports across countries. Journalist Rick Maese explained the appeal of the tattoo in The Washington Post:

Many plan the tattoo long before the competition. Others can’t resist the pull. The ink is a calling card for an exclusive club with a membership that never expires.

The tattoo has been described as a rite of passage for those who qualify for the Games. Obtaining the tattoo has also acted as a driving factor for athletes. Swimmer Missy Franklin was quoted in Reuters as saying: "I've seen [the tattoos] on all the other athletes and it's so cool. I've used it as my motivation". While the tattoo is most common among athletes, some people who did not compete in the Games also chose to get the tattoo, such as the parents of Olympians. Olympic archer Brady Ellison stated: "I feel like the Olympic rings is the one tattoo that only we can get".

=== Placement ===
The decision about where to receive the tattoo on the body varies among athletes, including Noah Lyles (lower right ribs), Dathan Ritzenhein (left calf), and Aries Merritt (left arm). Many include an olive wreath around the rings, such as Aschwin Wildeboer.

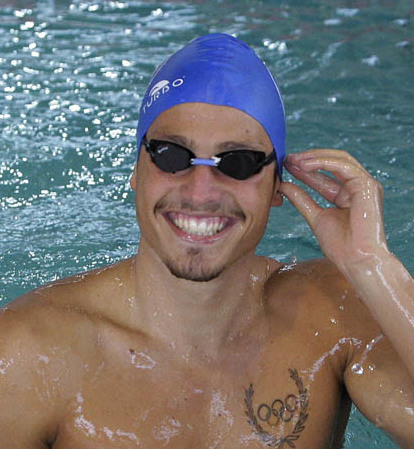
An Olympic tattoo on the chest of swimmer Aschwin Wildeboer

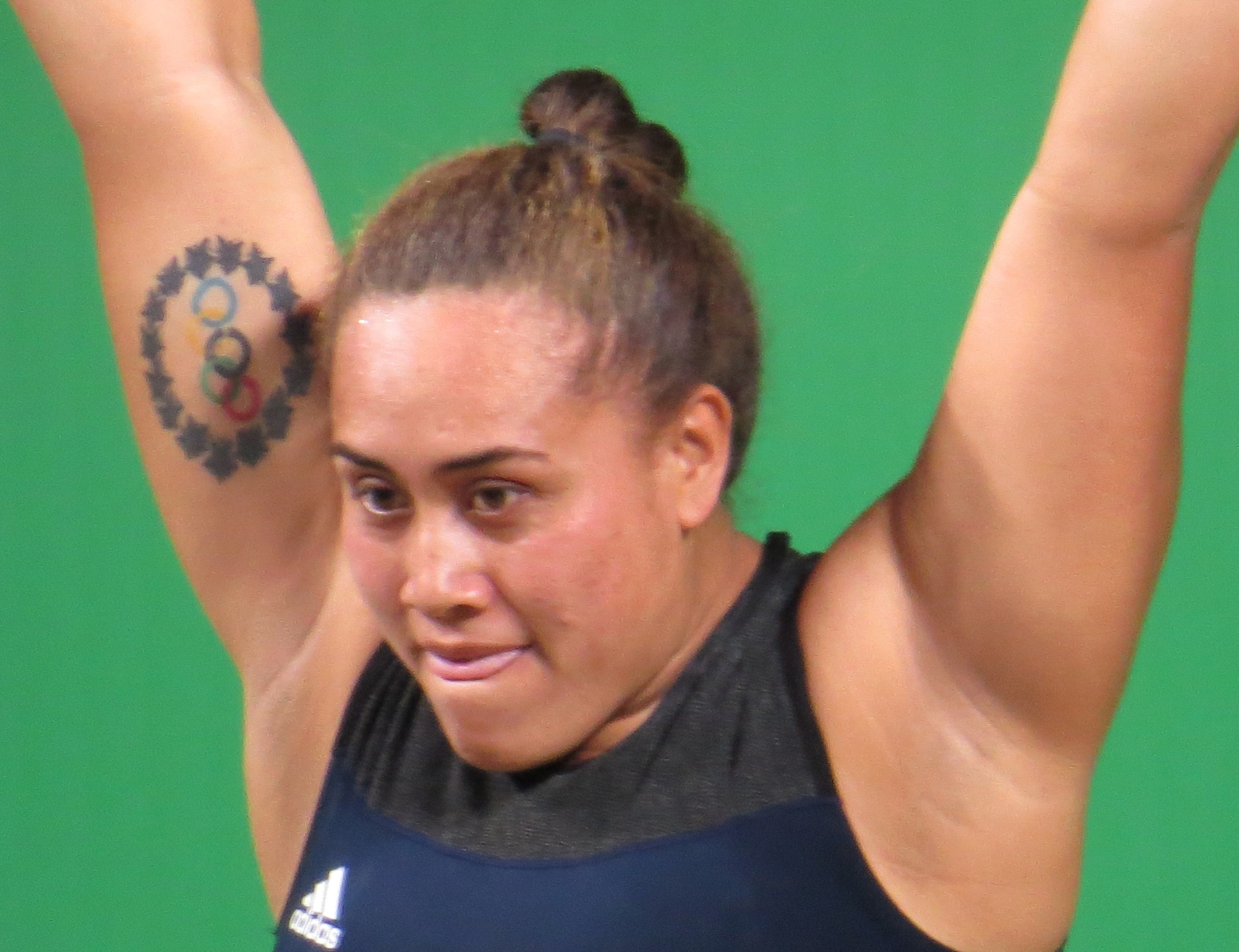
An Olympic tattoo on the upper arm of weightlifter Luisa Peters

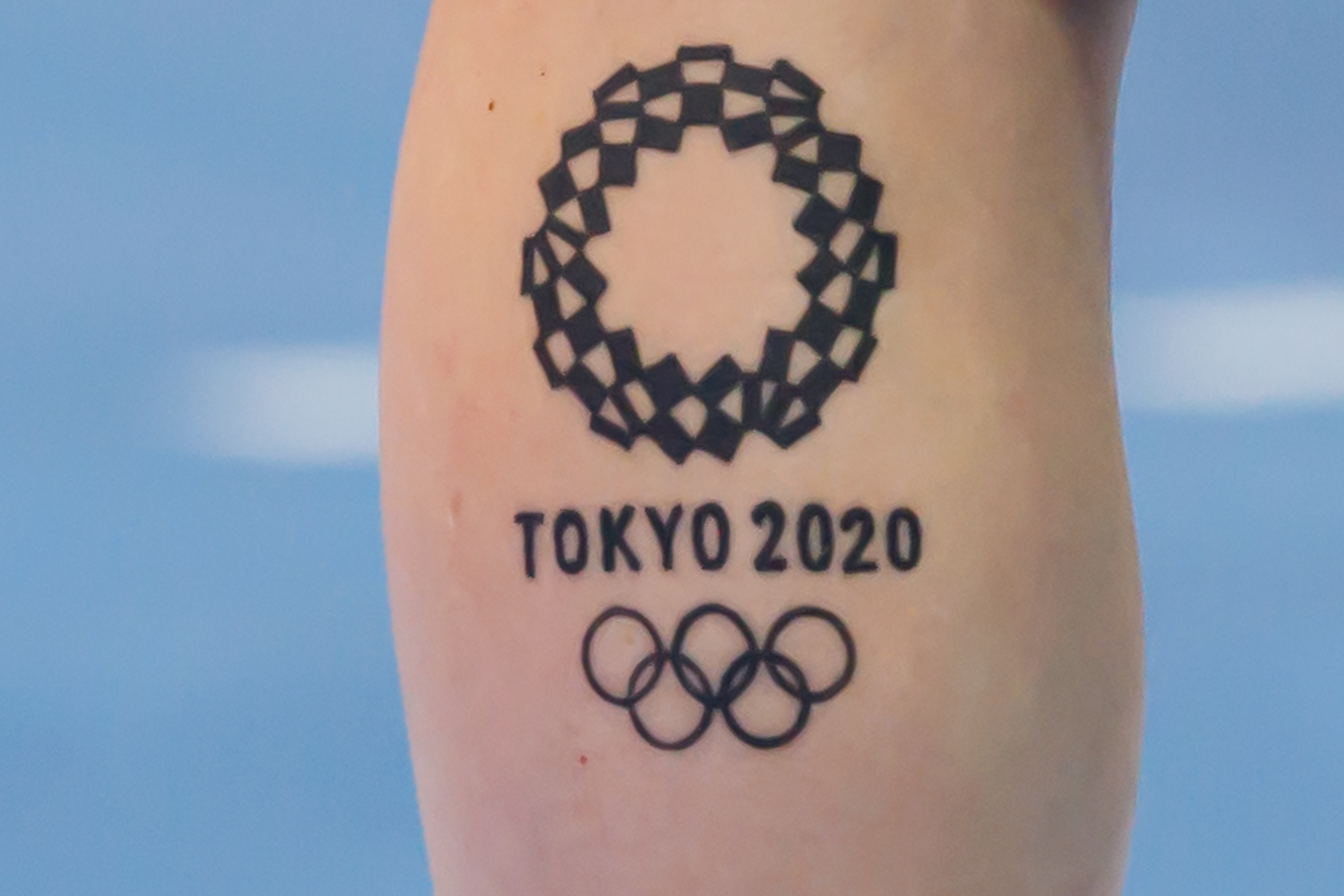
An Olympic tattoo on the calf of handball player Larissa Araújo

=== Controversy ===
Controversy was caused when the Paralympic champion Josef Craig was disqualified for displaying an Olympic tattoo during the 2016 Summer Paralympics, in violation of a rule stating that athletes could not display any advertisements on their body. Due to the rule, Paralympians had to cover such tattoos when competing at the Paralympic Games. The controversy arose again at the 2024 Summer Paralympics, and the rule banning the tattoos was dropped by the International Paralympic Committee.
