= Jay Mortenson =

American swimmer (born 1966)

Personal information
- Full name: Jay Paul Mortenson
- National team: United States
- Born: September 26, 1966 (age 59) Madison, Wisconsin, U.S.
- Occupation: Investment Banking
- Height: 6 ft 4 in (1.93 m)
- Weight: 190 lb (86 kg)

Sport
- Sport: Swimming
- Strokes: Backstroke, butterfly
- Club: Maple Bluff Country Club
- College team: Stanford University
- Coach: Tom Hargraves (Madison West High); Skip Kenney (Stanford)
Medal record
Men's swimming
Representing the United States
Olympic Games
Gold medal – first place	1988 Seoul	4x100 m medley relay
Summer Universiade
Gold medal – first place	1987 Zagreb	4x100 m medley
Bronze medal – third place	1987 Zagreb	100 m backstroke

Jay Paul Mortenson (born September 26, 1966) is an American former competition swimmer and 1988 Seoul Olympic gold medalist.

== High school era swimming ==
Mortenson was born September 26, 1966 in Madison, Wisconsin. Swimming for Maple Bluff Swim Club in the 15-19 age-group division at the Madison All-City Swim Meet on August 2, 1984, he set a city record of 48.33 in the 100-yard freestyle, and another city record of 51.99 in the 100-yard butterfly.

Starting with the team in 1981, Mortenson received All American honors as a high school competitor at the strong Madison West High School, program, where he swam for Madison West Coach Tom Hargraves, who began coaching swimming at West in 1962. From 1982 to 1985, Mortenson won a total of ten individual state championships with the team at Madison West, winning state titles in each of those seasons. In 1984, Mortenson set a summer state midwest 100-meter butterfly record of :56.33, and a 200-meter Butterfly record of 2:07.56. By 1985, Mortensen held the Wisconsin State Championship in both the 50 and 100-yard freestyle events. With stroke versatility, in February 1985, at the WIAA Wisconsin state championship, Mortensen set a state record in the 100-yard butterfly with a 48.93, and had broken the state record two years prior with a recorded time of 50.34. As a swimmer for Madison West, he had the highest national ranking in the 100-yard butterfly as a Senior, and in 1983 and 1985 was a High School Swimmer of the Year for the State of Wisconsin. As noted, Mortensen held both city and national age group records in his High School career.

== Stanford Cardinals ==
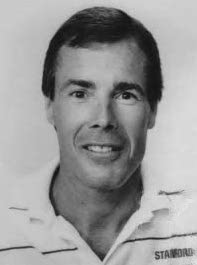
Stanford Coach Skip Kenney, 1988

Swimming for the Stanford Cardinals from 1986 to 1989, Mortenson was a part of four team conference titles in the Pac-10 and two NCAA national championships (1986 and 1987). Mortensen swam at Stanford throughout his collegiate career for Hall of Fame Head Coach Skip Kenney. Mortenson was the initial swimmer on backstroke for the 1987 Stanford medley relay team that won the NCAA title. Individually at Stanford, Jay collected ten Pac-10 titles, with three in the 100-yard backstroke, three in the 100-yard butterfly, three in the 400-yard medley relay, and one in the 200-yard medley relay. With individual NCAA titles, Jay won the 100-yard butterfly in 1988 and 1989, the 100-yard backstroke in 1988, and the 400-yard medley relay in 1987.

In International Swimming at the 1987 Universiade in Zagreb, Mortenson captured a gold medal in the 4x100 medley relay and a bronze in the 100 backstroke event.

== 1988 Olympic gold ==
At the 1988 Summer Olympics in Seoul, South Korea, Mortenson earned a gold medal by swimming for the winning U.S. team in the preliminary heats of the men's 4×100-meter medley relay, though he did not swim in the finals. The American team that later won the gold medal in the finals swam a combined time of 3:36.93, with the Canadian team taking the Silver, and the Russian team taking the bronze.

Jay also finished sixth at the 1988 Olympics in the final of the men's 100-meter butterfly with a time of 54.07. In an unexpected turn of events, 100-meter butterfly favorite American Pablo Morales failed to make the U.S. team at the 1988 U.S. trials. In a close second place at the finals in Seoul, favorite Matt Biondi finished with a 53.01, slowing slightly in his finish when he kicked to the wall and was passed by gold medalist Anthony Nesty of Surinam who took the gold, finishing with a time of 53.00. British swimmer Andy Jameson took the bronze with a 53.30.

In a highly competitive field, he finished eleventh overall in the B Final of the men's 100-meter backstroke with a time of 57.06.

=== Post swimming career ===
After ending his swimming career, Mortenson worked as a Los Angeles area banker specializing in investments.

=== Honors ===
In 1985, Mortenson was named Madison Sportsman of the Year. He was inducted into the Stanford Athletics Hall of Fame in 2011, and the Madison Sports Hall of Fame in 2012.

== See also ==
- List of Olympic medalists in swimming (men)
