= Aleksey Matveyev =

Russian swimmer

Personal information
- Nationality: Russian
- Born: 30 October 1970 (age 55) Moscow, Soviet Union

Sport
- Sport: Swimming

Aleksey Matveyev (born 30 October 1970) is a Russian swimmer. He competed in the men's 100 metre breaststroke at the 1988 Summer Olympics.
