= Josef Hladký =

Czech-German swimmer

Personal information
- Full name: Josef Hladký
- Nationality: Czech Republic
- Born: 18 June 1962 (age 64) Prague, Czechoslovakia
- Height: 1.88 m (6 ft 2 in)
- Weight: 86 kg (190 lb)

Sport
- Sport: Swimming
- Strokes: Medley
- Club: Schwimmverein Nikar Heidelberg
Medal record
European Championships (LC)
Representing Czechoslovakia
| Silver medal – second place | 1985 Sofia | 200 m medley |
| Bronze medal – third place | 1981 Split | 200 m medley |
| Bronze medal – third place | 1983 Rome | 200 m medley |
| Bronze medal – third place | 1983 Rome | 400 m medley |
Friendship Games
| Bronze medal – third place | 1984 Moscow | 400 metre individual medley |
| Bronze medal – third place | 1984 Moscow | 4×100 m freestyle relay |
| Bronze medal – third place | 1984 Moscow | 4×200 m freestyle relay |
| Bronze medal – third place | 1984 Moscow | 4×100 m medley relay |
Representing West Germany
| Bronze medal – third place | 1989 Bonn | 200 m medley |
European Championships (SC)
Representing Germany
| Gold medal – first place | 1991 Gelsenkirchen | 100 m medley |

Josef Hladký (born 18 June 1962 in Prague) is a retired male medley swimmer from the Czech Republic. He competed for Germany at the 1992 Summer Olympics in Barcelona, Spain, finishing in 32nd place in the men's 200 m individual medley event.
