= Tamás Debnár =

Hungarian swimmer

Personal information
- Nationality: Hungarian
- Born: 20 March 1971 (age 55) Budapest, Hungary

Sport
- Sport: Swimming

Tamás Debnár (born 20 March 1971) is a Hungarian swimmer. He competed in the men's 100 metre breaststroke at the 1988 Summer Olympics.
