= Tatyana Kurnikova =

Soviet swimmer (born 1965)

Personal information
- Born: 1 January 1965 (age 61) Baku, Azerbaijan SSR, Soviet Union

Sport
- Sport: Swimming
- Strokes: Butterfly
Medal record
European Championships
Silver medal – second place	1985 Sofia	4×100 m medley
Bronze medal – third place	1985 Sofia	100 m butterfly
Friendship Games
Gold medal – first place	1984 Moscow	100 m butterfly
Silver medal – second place	1984 Moscow	4×100 m medley
Silver medal – second place	1984 Moscow	4×100 m freestyle
Bronze medal – third place	1984 Moscow	200 m butterfly

Tatyana Stanislavovna Kurnikova (Russian: Татьяна Станиславовна Курникова; born 1965) is a Soviet swimmer who won two medals at the 1985 European Aquatics Championships. She missed the 1984 Summer Olympics due to their boycott by the Soviet Unions and competed at the Friendship Games instead, winning four medals. She won another four medals, two gold and two silver, at the Universiades in 1983 and 1985.

Currently she works as a swimming coach at a sports school in Moscow. and occasionally competes in the masters category.
