= Steve Bigelow =

American swimmer (born 1971)

Personal information
- Full name: Steven J. Bigelow
- National team: United States
- Born: June 10, 1971 (age 55) Fort Wayne, Indiana, U.S.
- Occupation: Swim Coach
- Height: 5 ft 9 in (1.75 m)
- Weight: 161 lb (73 kg)

Sport
- Sport: Swimming
- Strokes: Backstroke, freestyle
- Club: Pine Crest School; Fort Lauderdale, Fl.
- College team: University of Michigan
- Coach: Ralph Crocker (Pine Crest); Jon Urbanchek (Michigan)

Steven J. Bigelow (born June 10, 1971) is an American former competition swimmer who competed for the University of Michigan, and represented the United States in the 200-meter backstroke at the 1988 Summer Olympics in Seoul, South Korea. He would serve as a swim coach for at least a decade after retiring from competitive swimming.

== Early life and swimming ==
Bigelow was born June 10, 1971, in Fort Wayne, Indiana, and began competitive swimming by the age of five. While the family maintained a residence in Fort Wayne, Bigelow relocated to Fort Lauderdale, where he attended and swam for Florida's Pine Crest School, graduating around June 1989. At Pine Crest, he was mentored by Assistant Coach Ralph Crocker, who became Pine Crest's Head Coach in 1989, Bigelow's Senior year. An outstanding swim program, the Pine Crest team won state championships in 1984, 1985, and 1987. In 1987, Bigelow helped lead the team to the Florida State Championships, winning the 100-backstroke event in 50.89 and placing fourth in the 100 freestyle with a 46.85. He also swam the backstroke leg for Pine Crest's winning 200-yard Medley Relay team. At the District Championship, he swam the Butterfly leg for a Pine Crest 200-yard Medley Relay team that tied a Private School record time of 1:33.82.

== 1988 Olympics ==
In early August 1988, at the U.S. Olympic trials in Austin, Texas, in the summer of his High School Junior year, Bigelow qualified for the U.S. Olympic team with a 2:02.45 in the 200-meter backstroke finals, placing him second to Dan Veatch, who swam a 2:01.70.

As a 17-year-old, and the youngest 1988 U.S. Olympic team member, Bigelow competed in the B Final of the men's 200-meter backstroke, finishing with the tenth-fastest time overall (2:02.95).

=== University of Michigan ===
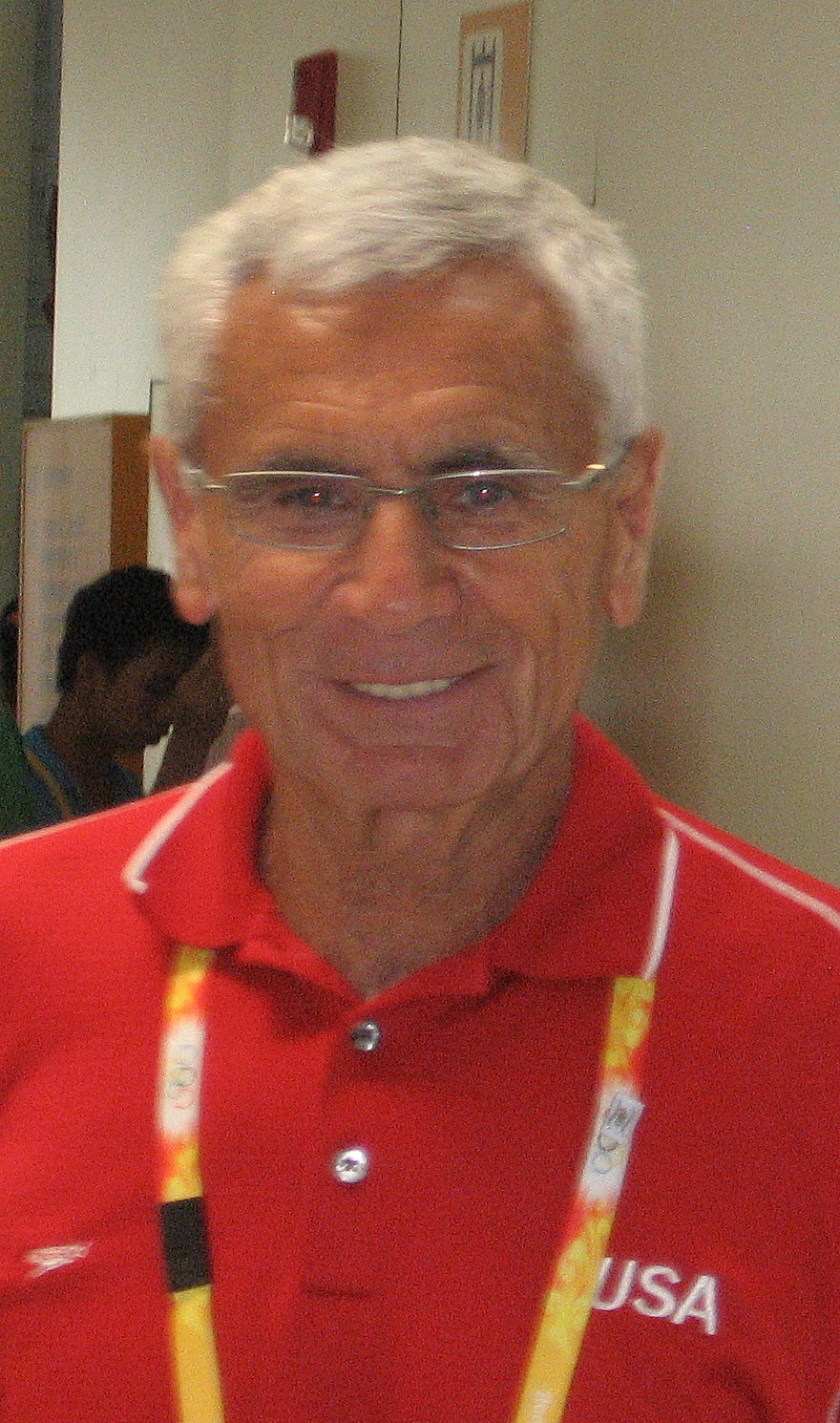
Coach J. Urbanchek

Bigelow attended and swam for the University of Michigan for three years under Head Coach Jon Urbanchek, beginning in the Fall of 1989, through around 1992, where he was an All-American and Big 10 Champion. During his years at Michigan, he held the school's sixth fastest time in the 100-yard backstroke, with a time of 48.81. In Mid-August, 1990, Bigelow set an Eastern Division Junior Olympic National Championship record in the 400-meter freestyle with a time of 4:00.40 at the Hall of Fame Pool in Fort Lauderdale. Around his Junior year, he had a sledding accident which left him paralyzed for a period. He continued to suffer from amnesia, but regained his motor skills and was able to train and qualify for the 1992 Olympic trials in Indianapolis.

During his Junior year at Michigan, at the 1992 U.S. Olympic trials on March 3, 1992, he placed ninth in the Men's 200-meter backstroke with a time of 2:02.37, indicating a strong recovery from his prior accident, though he did not make the U.S. team and just missed qualifying for the finals.

=== Coaching ===
In September 2006, Bigelow began serving as the Senior coach at the Aqua Crest Swim Team under Head Coach David Wright. Prior to working for Aqua Crest, he had served as a coach for nine years beginning around 1997, and had most recently coached at a Club in his hometown of Fort Wayne, Indiana. Prior to coaching at Fort Wayne, he worked as a YMCA and Club Coach at the Wolverine Club in Michigan and Florida's Pine Crest swim club, and had worked several summers coaching Summer Swim Camps for the Pine Crest club.

== Honors ==
Bigelow was honored as the 1988 Florida Gold Coast Swimmer of the Year. In December 1988, he was recognized as a First Team Relay Honoree by the South Florida Sun Sentinel.

== See also ==
- List of University of Michigan alumni
