= Virgin Islands at the 1988 Summer Olympics =

- Flag of the United States Virgin Islands
- IOC code: ISV
- NOC: Virgin Islands Olympic Committee

in Seoul
- Competitors: 22 (19 men, 3 women) in 6 sports
- Flag bearer: Robert Fellner
- Medals Ranked 36th: Gold 0 Silver 1 Bronze 0 Total 1

Summer Olympics appearances (overview)
- 1968; 1972; 1976; 1980; 1984; 1988; 1992; 1996; 2000; 2004; 2008; 2012; 2016; 2020; 2024; 2028

The United States Virgin Islands competed at the 1988 Summer Olympics in Seoul, South Korea. 22 competitors, 19 men and 3 women, took part in 27 events in 6 sports.

== Medalists ==
| Medal | Name | Sport | Event | Date |
|---|---|---|---|---|
| Silver | Peter Holmberg | Sailing | Finn | 27 September |

== Competitors ==
The following is the list of number of competitors in the Games.

| Sport | Men | Women | Total |
|---|---|---|---|
| Athletics | 6 | 1 | 7 |
| Cycling | 0 | 1 | 1 |
| Equestrian | 1 | 0 | 1 |
| Sailing | 6 | 0 | 6 |
| Shooting | 1 | 0 | 1 |
| Swimming | 5 | 1 | 6 |
| Total | 19 | 3 | 22 |

== Athletics ==
Men
Track & road events

| Athlete | Event | Heat | | Quarterfinal | | Semifinal | | Final | |
| Athlete | Event | Result | Rank | Result | Rank | Result | Rank | Result | Rank |
|---|---|---|---|---|---|---|---|---|---|
| Calvin Dallas | Marathon | —N/a | | | | | | 2:42.19 | 77 |
| Wallace Williams | Marathon | —N/a | | | | | | 2:44.40 | 81 |
| Marlon Williams | Marathon | —N/a | | | | | | 2:52.06 | 88 |

== Cycling ==
Road

| Athlete | Event | Time | Rank |
|---|---|---|---|
| Stephanie McKnight | Women's Road race | 2:01:50 | 48 |

== Equestrian ==
Eventing

| Rider | Horse | Event | Dressage | | Cross-country | | Jumping | | Overall | |
| Rider | Horse | Event | Points | Rank | Points | Rank | Points | Rank | Points | Rank |
|---|---|---|---|---|---|---|---|---|---|---|
| Andrew Bennie | Grayshott | Individual | 74.20 | 35 | 333.60 | 38 | 10.00 | 22 | 417.80 | 35 |

== Sailing ==
Men

| Athlete | Event | Race | | | | | | | Net points | Final rank |
| Athlete | Event | 1 | 2 | 3 | 4 | 5 | 6 | 7 | Net points | Final rank |
|---|---|---|---|---|---|---|---|---|---|---|
| Luke Baldauf | Division II | 25 | 25 | 30 | 22 | ~~RET~~ | 21 | 15 | 174.0 | 24 |
| Peter Holmberg | Finn | 17 | 2 | 3 | ~~PMS~~ | 1 | 3 | 2 | 40.4 | 2nd place, silver medalist(s) |

Open

| Athlete | Event | Race | | | | | | | Net points | Final rank |
| Athlete | Event | 1 | 2 | 3 | 4 | 5 | 6 | 7 | Net points | Final rank |
|---|---|---|---|---|---|---|---|---|---|---|
| Jean Braure; Hans Reiter | Tornado | 21 | 23 | 20 | 21 | ~~DNS~~ | 21 | RET | 166.0 | 22 |
| John F. Foster; John Foster | Star | 17 | 17 | ~~20~~ | 18 | 18 | 15 | 16 | 137.0 | 20 |

== Swimming ==
Men's 50m Freestyle

- Hans Foerster
  1. Heat – 24.72 (→ did not advance, 44th place)
- Ronald Pickard
  1. Heat – 25.01 (→ did not advance, 47th place)

Men's 100m Freestyle

- Hans Foerster
  1. Heat – 54.29 (→ did not advance, 54th place)
- Ronald Pickard
  1. Heat – 54.72 (→ did not advance, 58th place)

Men's 200m Freestyle

- Hans Foerster
  1. Heat – 2:01.94 (→ did not advance, 58th place)
- Kraig Singleton
  1. Heat – 2:06.45 (→ did not advance, 59th place)

Men's 100m Breaststroke

- Kristan Singleton
  1. Heat – 1:11.68 (→ did not advance, 55th place)

Men's 200m Breaststroke

- Kristan Singleton
  1. Heat – 1:00.97 (→ did not advance, 44th place)
- William Cleveland
  1. Heat – 1:01.10 (→ did not advance, 45th place)

Men's 200m Butterfly

- William Cleveland
  1. Heat – 2:13.19 (→ did not advance, 39th place)
- Kristan Singleton
  1. Heat – 2:19.68 (→ did not advance, 40th place)

Men's 200m Individual Medley

- Kraig Singleton
  1. Heat – 2:16.93 (→ did not advance, 46th place)

Men's 4 × 100 m Freestyle Relay

- Hans Foerster, Kraig Singleton, Kristan Singleton, and William Cleveland
  1. Heat – 3:43.23 (→ did not advance, 18th place)

Men's 4 × 100 m Freestyle Relay

- Hans Foerster, Kraig Singleton, Ronald Pickard, and William Cleveland
  1. Heat – 8:15.51 (→ did not advance, 13th place)

Men's 4 × 100 m Medley Relay

- William Cleveland, Kraig Singleton, Kristan Singleton, and Hans Foerster
  1. Heat – 4:15.03 (→ did not advance, 24th place)

Women's 100m Backstroke

- Tricia Duncan
  1. Heat – 1:10.37 (→ did not advance, 34th place)

Women's 200m Backstroke

- Tricia Duncan
  1. Heat – 2:33.97 (→ did not advance, 30th place)

== Demonstration sports ==
=== Taekwondo ===
| Athlete | Event | Round of 16 | Quarterfinals | Semifinals | Final | Rank |
| Athlete | Event | Opposition Result | Opposition Result | Opposition Result | Opposition Result | Rank |
|---|---|---|---|---|---|---|
| Robert Fellner | Men's Heavyweight | Álvarez (ESP); L PTS | did not advance | | | |
| Deborah Washington | Women's Welterweight | Limas (USA); L RSC | did not advance | | | |
| Tami Noel | Women's Middleweight | —N/a | De Jongh (NED); L PTS | did not advance | | |
| Phillicia Sprauve | Women's Heavyweight | —N/a | Jang (KOR); L PTS | did not advance | | |
