= Igor Polyansky =

Soviet swimmer

Medal record

Men's swimming

Representing the Soviet Union

Olympic Games
Gold medal – first place	1988 Seoul	200 m backstroke
Bronze medal – third place	1988 Seoul	100 m backstroke
Bronze medal – third place	1988 Seoul	4×100 m medley

World Championships (LC)
Gold medal – first place	1986 Madrid	100 m backstroke
Gold medal – first place	1986 Madrid	200 m backstroke
Bronze medal – third place	1986 Madrid	4×100 m medley

European Championships (LC)
Gold medal – first place	1985 Sofia	100 m backstroke
Gold medal – first place	1985 Sofia	200 m backstroke
Gold medal – first place	1987 Strasbourg	4×100 m medley
Silver medal – second place	1987 Strasbourg	200 m backstroke

Summer Universiade
Gold medal – first place	1985 Kobe	100 m backstroke
Gold medal – first place	1985 Kobe	200 m backstroke

Igor Nikolaevich Polianski (Russian: Игорь Николаевич Полянский) (born 20 March 1967 in Novosibirsk) is a former backstroke swimmer from the USSR.

Polianski trained at Dynamo in Novosibirsk. In 1986, he became the Honoured Master of Sports of the USSR. From 1985 to 1990, Polianski was a member of the USSR National Team. He won three medals at the 1988 Summer Olympics in Seoul, South Korea, including the gold in the 200 m backstroke. Polianski won gold medals at the 1986 World Aquatics Championships in the 100 m backstroke and 200 m backstroke and a bronze medal in the 4×100 m medley.

On 3 March 1985 in Erfurt, GDR, Polianski set the new world record in the 200 m backstroke at 1:58.14 that stood six years. Three years later, he improved the world record time in the 100 m backstroke three times: first on 15 March and 16 March in Tallinn, USSR, to 55.17 and 55.16 respectively, and then on 16 July in Moscow to 55.00. The latter was beaten by David Berkoff a month later.

In 1989, Polianski graduated from the Omsk State Institute of Physical Culture. He lives in New Zealand and runs a swimming school, Waterlions, in partnership with his wife. He is a member of the Auckland Swimming Community, coaching from the Epsom Girls Grammar and Massey High School campuses.

== See also ==
- List of members of the International Swimming Hall of Fame
- World record progression 100 metres backstroke
- World record progression 200 metres backstroke

Records
Preceded by Rick Carey	Men's 100 m backstroke world record holder (long course); March 15, 1988 – August 12, 1988	Succeeded by David Berkoff
