= Marcel Gery =

Slovak-Canadian swimmer

Personal information
- National team: Czechoslovakia; Canada
- Born: Marcel Géry; March 15, 1965 (age 61) Smolenice, Czechoslovakia
- Height: 1.91 m (6 ft 3 in)
- Weight: 84 kg (185 lb)

Sport
- Sport: Swimming
- Strokes: Butterfly
- Club: North York Aquatic Club
Medal record
Men's swimming
Representing Czechoslovakia
Friendship Games
Bronze medal – third place	1984 Moscow	100 metre butterfly
Bronze medal – third place	1984 Moscow	200 metre butterfly
Bronze medal – third place	1984 Moscow	4×100 m freestyle relay
Bronze medal – third place	1984 Moscow	4×200 m freestyle relay
Bronze medal – third place	1984 Moscow	4×100 m medley relay
European Championships (LC)
Bronze medal – third place	1985 Sofia	100 m butterfly
Universiade
Bronze medal – third place	1985 Kobe	200 m freestyle
Representing Canada
Olympic Games
Bronze medal – third place	1992 Barcelona	4×100 m medley
Pan Pacific Championships
Silver medal – second place	1991 Edmonton	100 m butterfly
Silver medal – second place	1991 Edmonton	4x100 m medley
Bronze medal – third place	1987 Brisbane	200 m freestyle
Bronze medal – third place	1991 Edmonton	4x100 m freestyle
Commonwealth Games
Gold medal – first place	1990 Auckland	4x100 m medley
Silver medal – second place	1990 Auckland	100m butterfly
Bronze medal – third place	1990 Auckland	4x100 m freestyle

Marcel Gery (born Marcel Géry March 15, 1965) is a Slovak-Canadian former butterfly swimmer. He was born in Czechoslovakia and competed for the Czechoslovak national team in international competitions.

At the 1985 Summer Universiade, Gery won a bronze medal in the 200-metre freestyle.

He later emigrated to Canada and competed for the Canadian national team at the 1992 Summer Olympics in Barcelona, Spain. There he won bronze medal with the men's 4×100-metres medley relay team, alongside Mark Tewksbury, Jonathan Cleveland and Stephen Clarke.

== See also ==
- List of Commonwealth Games medallists in swimming (men)
- List of Olympic medalists in swimming (men)
