= Frank Hoffmeister =

German swimmer

Medal record

Men's Swimming

Representing West Germany

World Championships (LC)
Silver medal – second place	1986 Madrid	4×100 m medley
Bronze medal – third place	1986 Madrid	200 m backstroke
Bronze medal – third place	1991 Perth	4×100 m medley

European Championships (LC)
Bronze medal – third place	1987 Strasbourg	100 m backstroke

Frank Hoffmeister, born 9 October 1965, is a former backstroke swimmer from West Germany.

Frank competed in the 100 metre backstroke at the 1988 Summer Olympics in Seoul, South Korea, finishing seventh in the Championship Final in a time of 56.19 seconds.

He swam the opening backstroke leg for the West German team that finished fourth in the 4×100 metre medley relay in a time of 3 minutes 42.98 seconds.
