= Alexandr Prigoda =

Russian swimmer

Personal information
- Born: 1964 (age 61–62) Rostov-on-Don, Russia

Sport
- Sport: Swimming
Medal record
Friendship Games
| Gold medal – first place | 1984 Moscow | 200 metre butterfly |

Alexandr Sergeyevich Prigoda (Russian: Александр Серге́евич Пригода; born 1964) is a Russian swimmer. He qualified for the 1984 Summer Olympics but missed them due to the boycott by the Soviet Union. He competed in the Friendship Games instead and won a gold medal in the 200 m and silver medal in the 100 m butterfly events. He won multiple nation titles in senior and masters categories (2001–2009).

He started swimming in a club aged 7, together with his younger brother, Gennadiy Prigoda, a Russian former Olympic swimmer.
