= William Cleveland =

American swimmer (born 1965)

Personal information
- Born: September 27, 1965 (age 60)
- Height: 185 cm (6 ft 1 in)
- Weight: 73 kg (161 lb)

Sport
- Sport: Swimming

William Cleveland (born September 27, 1965) is a swimmer who represented the United States Virgin Islands. He competed in five events at the 1988 Summer Olympics.

== Results ==
Discipline (Sport)/Event	Position
4 × 100 metres Freestyle Relay, Men	18
4 × 200 metres Freestyle Relay, Men	13
100 metres Butterfly, Men	45
200 metres Butterfly, Men	39
4 × 100 metres Medley Relay, Men	24

== See also ==
- 1988 Summer Olympics
- Swimming at the 1988 Summer Olympics
- Virgin Islands at the 1988 Summer Olympics
