= Frank Baltrusch =

East German swimmer (born 1964)

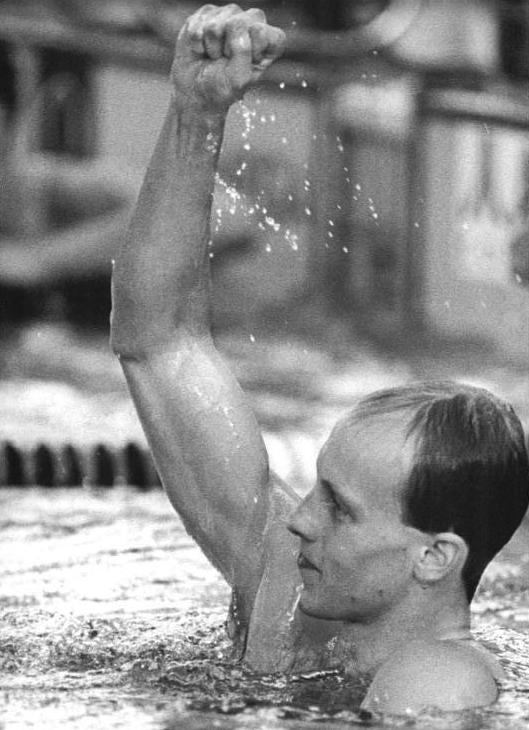
- Baltrusch in 1988

Personal information
- Full name: Frank Baltrusch
- Nationality: East German
- Born: 21 March 1964 (age 62) Magdeburg, East Germany
- Height: 1.93 m (6 ft 4 in)
- Weight: 92 kg (203 lb)

Sport
- Sport: Swimming
- Strokes: Backstroke
- Club: Sportclub Magdeburg
Medal record
Men's swimming
Representing East Germany
Friendship Games
Bronze medal – third place	1984 Moscow	100 m backstroke
Olympic Games
Silver medal – second place	1988 Seoul	200 m backstroke
World Championships (LC)
Silver medal – second place	1986 Madrid	200 m backstroke
Bronze medal – third place	1982 Guayaquil	200 m backstroke
European Championships (LC)
Silver medal – second place	1987 Strasbourg	100 m backstroke
Bronze medal – third place	1983 Rome	200 m backstroke
Bronze medal – third place	1985 Sofia	200 m backstroke
Bronze medal – third place	1987 Strasbourg	200 m backstroke
Bronze medal – third place	1987 Strasbourg	4×100 m medley

Frank Baltrusch (born 21 March 1964) is a former backstroke swimmer from East Germany who won the silver medal in the 200 m backstroke at the 1988 Summer Olympics in Seoul, South Korea, in a time of 1:59.60.

He finished 6th in the final of the 100m backstroke in a time of 56.10 seconds.
