= Sergei Zabolotnov =

Soviet swimmer (born 1963)

Personal information
- Born: 11 August 1963 (age 63) Tashkent, Uzbek SSR, Soviet Union
- Height: 1.94 m (6 ft 4 in)
- Weight: 90 kg (198 lb)

Sport
- Sport: Swimming
- Club: Zenit, Trud (1981–1982) SKA (1983) Dynamo (1984–1990)
Medal record
Representing Soviet Union
Olympic Games
| Bronze medal – third place | 1988 Seoul | 4×100 m medley |
World Championships
| Bronze medal – third place | 1986 Madrid | 100 m backstroke |
European Championships
| Gold medal – first place | 1983 Rome | 200 m backstroke |
| Gold medal – first place | 1987 Strasbourg | 100 m backstroke |
| Gold medal – first place | 1987 Strasbourg | 200 m backstroke |
| Gold medal – first place | 1989 Bonn | 4×100 m medley |
| Silver medal – second place | 1985 Sofia | 200 m backstroke |
| Silver medal – second place | 1989 Bonn | 100 m backstroke |
| Bronze medal – third place | 1983 Rome | 100 m backstroke |
| Bronze medal – third place | 1985 Sofia | 100 m backstroke |
Summer Universiade
| Gold medal – first place | 1981 Bucharest | 100 m backstroke |
| Gold medal – first place | 1981 Bucharest | 200 m backstroke |
| Gold medal – first place | 1981 Bucharest | 4x100 m medley |
| Gold medal – first place | 1983 Edmonton | 200 m backstroke |
| Bronze medal – third place | 1985 Kobe | 100 m backstroke |
Friendship Games
| Gold medal – first place | 1984 Moscow | 200 m backstroke |

Sergei Valentinovich Zabolotnov (also Sergey, Russian: Серге́й Валентинович Заболотнов; born 11 August 1963, is a former backstroke swimmer from the USSR.

== Career ==
In 1983, he set a European record in the 200 m backstroke. The time of 2:00.42 was achieved on 4 July 1983 at Edmonton, Canada, when winning a gold medal whilst competing in the World University Games. He set his second European record on 15 February 1984, recording 2:00.39 at the Soviet Winter Nationals.

After missing the 1984 Summer Olympic Games in Los Angeles of late July and early August due to the eastern bloc boycott, Zabolotnov competed at the Friendship Games in Moscow, USSR, winning the gold medal for the 200 m backstroke in a world record time of 1:58.41 on 21 August 1984. This time eclipsed the previous world record of 1:58.86 set by Rick Carey, USA on 27 June 1984 at the USA Olympic Swimming Trials. Rick Carey won the gold medal for the 200 m backstroke in Los Angeles in a time of 2:00.23, three weeks before Zabolotnov's world record swim. Carey recorded 1:58.99 in the preliminaries in Los Angeles for an Olympic record.

Zabolotnov competed at the 1988 Summer Olympic Games in Seoul, South Korea, in both the 100 and 200 m backstroke, finishing fourth in each. His time in the 100 m backstroke was 55.37. His time in the 200 m backstroke was 2:00.52. He competed in the preliminaries of the 4 × 100 m medley relay only but earned a bronze medal when the Soviet team finished behind the United States and Canadian teams in the final.
