= Daichi Suzuki =

Japanese swimmer (born 1967)

- 鈴木 大地
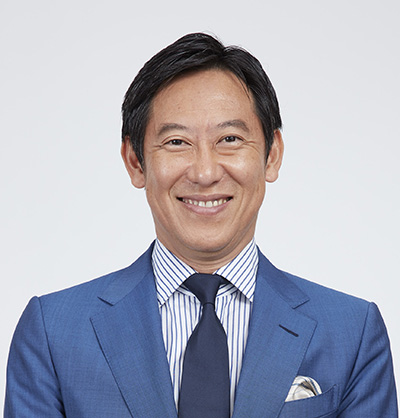
- Official portrait, 2023

Member of the House of Councillors
- Incumbent
- Assumed office 29 July 2025
- Preceded by: Tamayo Marukawa
- Constituency: Tokyo at-large

Commissioner of the Japan Sports Agency
- In office 1 October 2015 – 30 September 2020
- Prime Minister: Shinzo Abe
- Preceded by: Office established
- Succeeded by: Koji Murofushi

Personal details
- Born: 10 March 1967 (age 59) Narashino, Chiba, Japan
- Sports career
- Height: 1.80 m (5 ft 11 in)
- Weight: 68 kg (150 lb)
- Sport: Swimming
- Strokes: Backstroke
- College team: Juntendo University
Medal record
Representing Japan
Olympic Games
Gold medal – first place	1988 Seoul	100 m backstroke
Pan Pacific Championships
Silver medal – second place	1987 Brisbane	100 m backstroke
Summer Universiade
Gold medal – first place	1987 Zagreb	100 m backstroke
Gold medal – first place	1987 Zagreb	200 m backstroke
Asian Games
Gold medal – first place	1986 Seoul	100 m backstroke
Gold medal – first place	1986 Seoul	4×100 m medley

Daichi Suzuki (鈴木 大地, Suzuki Daichi; born 10 March 1967, in Narashino, Chiba) is a Japanese politician and retired backstroke swimmer. He won a gold medal at the 1988 Summer Olympics in Seoul.

== Swimming ==
Suzuki developed the swimming technique called underwater dolphin kick or what is known as the Berkoff Blastoff in the United States. This style in backstroke swimming was invented by either David Berkoff or Jesse Vasallo. However, it was Suzuki who finally developed the skill, allowing him to swim 25 meters underwater at the 1984 Summer Olympics held in Los Angeles. Four years later, he won the gold medal in the 100-meter backstroke at the 1988 Seoul Olympics where Berkoff also competed.

== Career ==
In 2013, Daichi was the head of the Japan Swimming Federation. On 5 September 2015, it was confirmed that he would take up a new position as head of Japan's new national sports agency, which was launched on 1 October 2015. The new organization, which is called Japan Sports Agency, is an Incorporated Administrative Agency or similar of the Ministry of Education, Culture, Sports, Science and Technology. Its primary role is coordinating a wide range of sports-related functions and projects carried out by various government ministries. Specifically, the 121-person agency is tasked to improve Japan's athletic performance in the 2020 Summer Olympics in Tokyo.

In October 2016, he became vice president of Asia Aquatics. In July 2017, he was elected Bureau Member of the World Aquatics.

On 5 April 2021, The International Swimming Hall of Fame (ISHOF) announced that Daichi Suzuki would be inducted into the ISHOF Class of 2021 as an "Honor Swimmer". In fact, Daichi Suzuki was announced by ISHOF that he would have been inducted into the ISHOF Class of 2020 in 2019, but due to the COVID-19 pandemic, the 2020 induction was postponed to 2021.

On 9 May 2023, Asian University Sports Federation selected Daichi Suzuki as one of the Assessors.

On 18 November 2023, the International University Sports Federation selected Daichi Suzuki as one of the FISU Executive Committee Members.

== Educational background ==
- Ph.D in medicine, Juntendo University
