= Svitlana Kopchykova =

Ukrainian swimmer (born 1967)

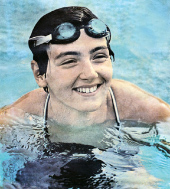
- Svitlana Kopchykova in 1987

Personal information
- Born: 17 March 1967 (age 59) Cherkasy, Soviet Union

Sport
- Sport: Swimming
Medal record
Representing Soviet Union
Summer Universiade
Gold medal – first place	1985 Kobe	200m individual medley

Svitlana Kopchykova (born 17 March 1967) is a Ukrainian swimmer. She competed in three events at the 1988 Summer Olympics representing the Soviet Union.
