= Sean Murphy (swimmer) =

Canadian swimmer (born 1964)

Personal information
- Full name: Sean Murphy
- National team: Canada
- Born: March 21, 1964 (age 62) Montreal, Quebec, Canada
- Height: 1.83 m (6 ft 0 in)
- Weight: 76 kg (168 lb)

Sport
- Sport: Swimming
- Strokes: Backstroke
- Club: Etobicoke Swim Club
- College team: Stanford University
Medal record
Men's swimming
Representing Canada
Pan Pacific Championships
Bronze medal – third place	1985 Tokyo	200 m backstroke
Summer Universiade
Silver medal – second place	1985 Kobe	200 m backstroke

Sean Murphy (born March 21, 1964) is a former backstroke swimmer from Canada, who competed for six years on the Canada national swimming team, setting several national records. Murphy competed in several international competitions, including the Pan Pacific Swimming Championships, Commonwealth Games, World University Games, FINA World Aquatics Championships, and the 1988 Summer Olympics in Seoul, South Korea. There, he finished in 8th in the final of the men's 100-metre backstroke.

Murphy attended Stanford University, and competed for the Stanford Cardinal swimming and diving team from 1985 to 1988. As a college swimmer, he won three individual National Collegiate Athletic Association (NCAA) championships and contributed to three NCAA national team championships. He would also earn an MBA from Harvard Business School.

== See also ==
- List of Commonwealth Games medallists in swimming (men)
