= Horst Niehaus =

Costa Rican swimmer (born 1968)

Personal information
- Nationality: Costa Rica
- Born: 23 July 1968 (age 57)

Sport
- Sport: Swimming
- Strokes: Backstroke, Butterfly, Medley

Horst Niehaus (born 23 July 1968) is a Costa Rican swimmer. He competed in three events at the 1988 Summer Olympics.
