= Eðvarð Þór Eðvarðsson =

Icelandic swimmer

Personal information
- Born: 29 January 1967 (age 59)

Sport
- Sport: Swimming

Eðvarð Þór Eðvarðsson (born 29 January 1967) is an Icelandic backstroke and medley swimmer. He competed in three events at the 1988 Summer Olympics.
