= Georgi Mihalev =

Bulgarian swimmer

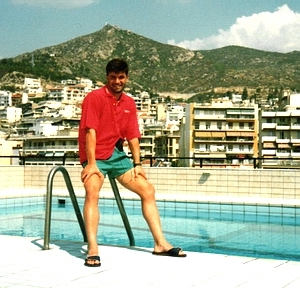

Personal information
- Born: 16 July 1968 (age 57) Burgas, Bulgaria

Sport
- Sport: Swimming
- Strokes: Backstroke

Georgi Petrov Mihalev (Bulgarian: Георги Петров Михалев; born 16 July 1968) is a retired backstroke swimmer from Bulgaria. He was a member of the Bulgarian National Swimming Team for the period of 1981 to 1994.

== Major Achievements ==
- Two time European vicechampion for cadets in 100-meter and 200-meter backstroke, Mulhouse - 1983
- Two time European Champion for cadets in 100-meter and 200-meter backstroke, Luxembourg - 1984
- Champion of Bulgaria between 1982 - 1993
- Bulgarian national record holder in men's 50-meter, 100-meter and 200-meter backstroke
- Many times champion of Balkan games

== Event participation ==
- Friendship Games (1984) in Moscow
- 1988 Summer Olympics in Seoul, South Korea and 1992 Summer Olympics in Barcelona, Spain
- World Swimming Championships - 1986 Madrid, Spain; 1991 Perth, Australia
- European Championships for cadets and later for men - between 1982 and 1993
- Balkan Championship Games
