= Carl Wilson (swimmer) =

Australian swimmer

Personal information
- Born: 31 May 1967 (age 59)

Sport
- Sport: Swimming
Medal record
Men's swimming
Representing Australia
Commonwealth Games
Bronze medal – third place	1986 Edinburgh	4×100 m medley

Carl Brendon Wilson (born 31 May 1967) is an Australian swimmer. He competed in two events at the 1988 Summer Olympics.
