= Alejandro Alvizuri =

Peruvian swimmer

Personal information
- Full name: Alejandro Luis Alvizuri Mack
- Born: April 18, 1968 (age 58)
Medal record
Men's swimming
Representing Peru
Pan American Games
Bronze medal – third place	1987 Indianapolis	100 m backstroke

Alejandro Luis Alvizuri Mack (born April 18, 1968) is a retired backstroke swimmer from Peru, who represented his native country in three consecutive Summer Olympics, starting in 1984 (Los Angeles, California). His biggest success was winning the bronze medal in the men's 100 m backstroke at the 1987 Pan American Games.

Alvizuri has a long history of accomplishments in South American Championships and Games. Between 1983 and 1992, Alejandro earned a total of 14 South American Championship medals, from which he has won gold five times.

While a varsity swimmer at the University of Michigan, Alejandro became a four-time All American, and a four-time Letter winner at Michigan. He is also a former U of M and Big Ten record holder in several events, being co-captain of the Michigan team his senior year.

At the 1992 Olympics, he set for the last timePeru Records in the 100 and 200 backstrokes (57.72 and 2:03.10). As of 2012, both are still the national records.
