= Petr Kladiva =

Czech swimmer

Personal information
- Born: 4 July 1967 (age 59)

Sport
- Sport: Swimming
Medal record
Friendship Games
Bronze medal – third place	1984 Moscow	4×100 m freestyle relay
Bronze medal – third place	1984 Moscow	4×200 m freestyle relay
Bronze medal – third place	1984 Moscow	4×100 m medley relay

Petr Kladiva (born 4 July 1967) is a Czech swimmer. He competed in three events at the 1988 Summer Olympics.
