= Brett Halford =

Zimbabwean swimmer (born 1971)

Personal information
- Born: 19 June 1971 (age 55)

Sport
- Sport: Swimming
Medal record
Men's swimming
Representing Zimbabwe
All-Africa Games
Bronze medal – third place	1991 Cairo	100 m backstroke

Brett Halford (born 19 June 1971) is a Zimbabwean backstroke swimmer. He competed in two events at the 1988 Summer Olympics.
