= Kristan Singleton =

US Virgin Islands swimmer (born 1971)

Personal information
- Born: October 12, 1971 (age 54)

Sport
- Sport: Swimming
- College team: Harvard Crimson

Kristan Singleton (born October 12, 1971) is a swimmer who represented the United States Virgin Islands. He competed at the 1988 Summer Olympics and the 1992 Summer Olympics.
