= Alexander Mayer (swimmer) =

German swimmer

Personal information
- Born: 7 July 1967 (age 59) Kaufbeuren, West Germany

Sport
- Sport: Swimming

Alexander Mayer (born 7 July 1967) is a German former swimmer. He competed in two events at the 1988 Summer Olympics representing West Germany.
