= Wladimir Ribeiro =

Brazilian swimmer

Vladimir Ribeiro
Personal information
- Full name: Vladimir Michailowsky Leite Ribeiro
- Born: 17 June 1967 (age 59) Pedregulho, São Paulo, Brazil
- Height: 1.85 m (6 ft 1 in)
- Weight: 75 kg (165 lb)

Sport
- Sport: Swimming
- Strokes: Backstroke, Freestyle and Butterfly
- Club: Minas Tênis Clube

Vladimir Michailowsky Leite Ribeiro (born 17 June 1967) is a former international butterfly and backstroke swimmer from Brazil. He participated for his native South American country at the 1988 Summer Olympics in Seoul, South Korea. There his best finish was the 32nd place in the men's 100-metre butterfly event.
