= Eric Greenwood =

Costa Rican swimmer (1967–2003)

Personal information
- Born: 12 April 1967
- Died: 14 January 2003 (aged 35)

Sport
- Sport: Swimming

Eric Greenwood (12 April 1967 – 14 January 2003) was a Costa Rican swimmer. He competed in three events at the 1988 Summer Olympics.
