= Paul Kingsman =

New Zealand swimmer (born 1967)

Paul Kingsman MBE
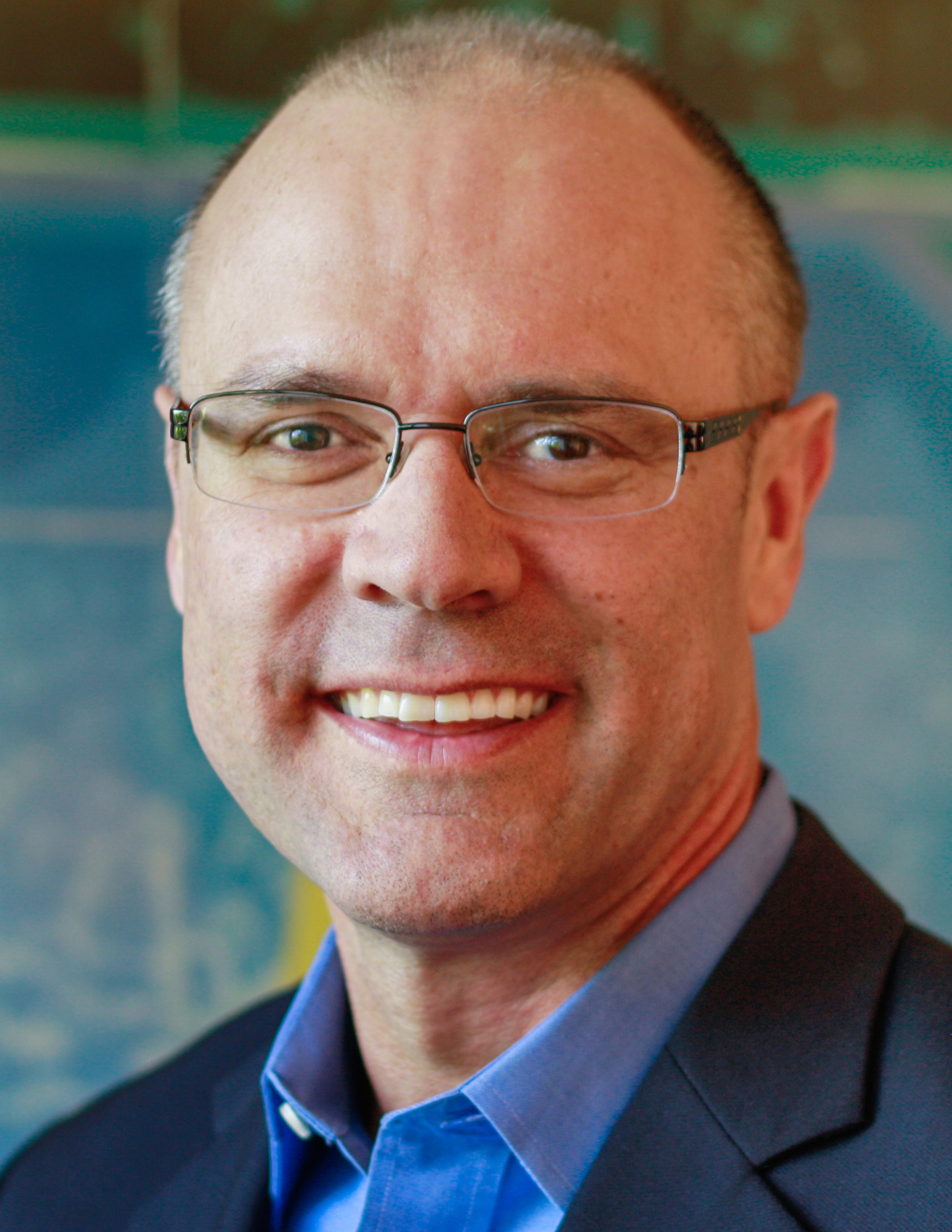
- Kingsman in 2015

Personal information
- Full name: Paul James Kingsman
- Born: 15 June 1967 (age 59) Auckland, New Zealand
- Height: 1.82 m (5 ft 11 1/2 in)
- Weight: 85 kg (187 lb)

Sport
- Country: New Zealand
- Sport: Swimming
- Event: Backstroke
- College team: UC Berkeley (1986–1989)
Medal record
Men's swimming
Representing New Zealand
Olympic Games
Bronze medal – third place	1988 Seoul	200 m Backstroke
Pan Pacific Championships
Bronze medal – third place	1987 Brisbane	100 m backstroke
Bronze medal – third place	1989 Tokyo	200 m backstroke
Commonwealth Games
Silver medal – second place	1986 Edinburgh	200 m backstroke
Silver medal – second place	1986 Edinburgh	100 m backstroke
Silver medal – second place	1990 Auckland	200 m backstroke
Bronze medal – third place	1990 Auckland	100 m backstroke

Paul James Kingsman MBE (born 15 June 1967) is a swimmer and Olympic medalist from New Zealand. He participated at the 1988 Summer Olympics, winning a bronze medal in 200 metre backstroke. He also competed at the 1984 Summer Olympics.

== Background ==
The 21-year-old went into the 1988 Olympic Games the 20th fastest backstroker in the world over 200m. He qualified for the final and raced in lane one. Kingsman's time earned him a bronze medal in the final few strokes. His time of 2:00.48, which set a new Commonwealth record, is currently the longest standing national record in New Zealand swimming at 20 years (broken in 2008 by Kent Basset). Kingsman was New Zealand's first male Olympic medalist in an individual swimming event.

Over his swimming career, in addition to his Olympic medal, Kingsman also earned four Commonwealth Games medals and twelve New Zealand national senior titles. Kingsman was trained during his entire New Zealand career by coach Hilton Brown. When he was 15, he qualified for the 1982 Commonwealth Games team, making the 200m final at Brisbane, Queensland. At the time, he was the youngest Kiwi to ever compete in the Commonwealth Games.

At age 17, he joined Gary Hurring in representing New Zealand at the 1984 Summer Olympics swimming backstroke, and he finished tenth in the 100m. By the 1986 Commonwealth Games in Edinburgh, Kingsman's performances bettered enough to earn him two silver medals, in the 100m and 200m backstroke. That year, he also earned a scholarship to the University of California, Berkeley, where his swimming developed a sharply competitive edge under the tutelage of coach Nort Thornton.

Kingsman closed his career by taking a bronze and a silver in the 1990 Commonwealth Games in his home town of Auckland, New Zealand. He was always an exceedingly popular competitor, and his farewell at those Games in Auckland was an emotional occasion. In the 1990 Queen's Birthday Honours, Kingsman was appointed a Member of the Order of the British Empire, for services to swimming.

On retiring from swimming, Kingsman took up a position as New Zealand national sales and marketing manager for Speedo sportswear. He then set up and operated his own swim school in Auckland. In 2001, he moved to the San Francisco Bay Area with his wife and son and currently lives in Greenville, South Carolina, where Kingsman is a financial advisor and also a professional motivational speaker and executive coach to the financial services industry.

== See also ==
- List of Commonwealth Games medallists in swimming (men)
- List of Olympic medalists in swimming (men)
