= Patrick Ferland =

Swiss swimmer

Personal information
- Born: 12 September 1965 (age 60) Lausanne, Switzerland

Sport
- Sport: Swimming

Patrick Ferland (born 12 September 1965) is a Swiss backstroke swimmer. He competed at the 1984 Summer Olympics and the 1988 Summer Olympics.
