= Pavel Vokoun =

Czech swimmer

Personal information
- Born: 22 May 1970 (age 56) Prague, Czechoslovakia

Sport
- Sport: Swimming

Pavel Vokoun (born 22 May 1970) is a Czech swimmer, actor, and stuntman. He competed in three events at the 1988 Summer Olympics. He is best known for playing Donovan "Bull" Briley in the 2001 American war film Black Hawk Down, and for minor roles in Jojo Rabbit, Frank Herbert's Dune, Les Misérables, and Whiskey Cavalier.
