= Mohamed Abdullah (swimmer) =

Emirati swimmer (born 1973)

Personal information
- Born: 1973 (age 52–53)

Sport
- Sport: Swimming

Mohamed Abdullah (born 1973) is an Emirati swimmer. He competed in six events at the 1988 Summer Olympics.
