= Kraig Singleton =

American swimmer (born 1971)

Personal information
- Born: October 12, 1971 (age 54)

Sport
- Sport: Swimming

Kraig Singleton (born October 12, 1971) is a swimmer who represented the United States Virgin Islands. He competed in six events at the 1988 Summer Olympics.
