= Park Dong-pil =

South Korean swimmer

Personal information
- Born: 14 August 1968 (age 57)

Sport
- Sport: Swimming

Park Dong-pil (born 14 August 1968) is a South Korean backstroke swimmer. He competed in three events at the 1988 Summer Olympics.
