= Lin Laijiu =

Chinese swimmer (born 1968)

Personal information
- Born: April 29, 1968 (age 58)

Sport
- Sport: Swimming
Medal record
Representing China
Asian Games
Gold medal – first place	1990 Beijing	100m backstroke
Gold medal – first place	1990 Beijing	4x100m medley relay

Lin Laijiu (born 29 April 1968) is a Chinese former backstroke swimmer who competed in the 1988 Summer Olympics and in the 1992 Summer Olympics. He won a gold medal in the men's 100 metre backstroke at the 1990 Asian Games.
