= Hans Foerster =

American swimmer (born 1965)

Personal information
- Born: May 14, 1965 (age 61)

Sport
- Sport: Swimming

Hans Foerster (born May 14, 1965) is a swimmer who represented the United States Virgin Islands. He competed in six events at the 1988 Summer Olympics.
