= Lars Sørensen (swimmer) =

Danish swimmer

Personal information
- Born: 3 January 1968 (age 58) Holstebro, Midtjylland, Denmark

Sport
- Sport: Swimming
Medal record
Representing Denmark
European Championships
Gold medal – first place	1991 Athens	200m individual medley

Lars Sørensen (born 3 January 1968) is a Danish former swimmer who competed in the 1988 Olympics and 1992 Olympics. In the 1992 Olympic games, held in Barcelona, he secured 48th place in the 100m Breaststroke, 36th place in the 200m Backstroke, and 11th place in the 200m Individual Medley. In the 1998 Olympic games, held in Seoul, he secured 21st place in the 100m Backstroke, 48th place in the 100m Breaststroke, 26th place in the 200m Backstroke, and 14th place in the 4 x 100m Medley Relay.
