= David Berkoff =

American swimmer (born 1966)

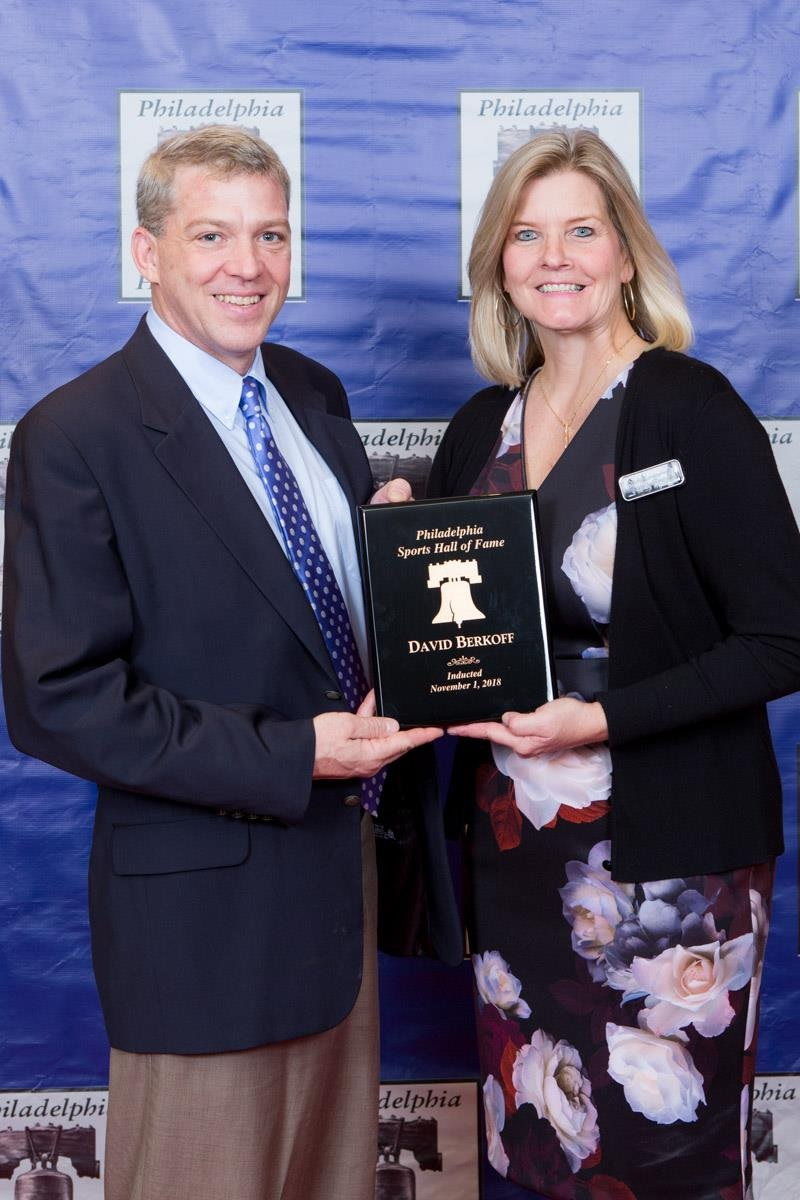
- Berkoff (left)

Personal information
- Full name: David Charles Berkoff
- Nickname: "Dave"
- National team: United States
- Born: November 30, 1966 (age 59) Abington, Pennsylvania, U.S.
- Height: 5 ft 9 in (1.75 m)
- Weight: 154 lb (70 kg)

Sport
- Sport: Swimming
- Strokes: Backstroke
- Club: Germantown Academy Aquatic; Foxcatcher Swim Club; Bernal's Gator Swim Club
- College team: Harvard University; 1989 Graduate
- Coach: Joe Bernal (Harvard); Dick Shoulberg (Germantown, Foxcatcher)
Medal record
Men's swimming
Representing the United States
Olympic Games
| Gold medal – first place | 1988 Seoul | 4x100 m medley |
| Gold medal – first place | 1992 Barcelona | 4x100 m medley |
| Silver medal – second place | 1988 Seoul | 100 m backstroke |
| Bronze medal – third place | 1992 Barcelona | 100 m backstroke |
Pan American Games
| Silver medal – second place | 1987 Indianapolis | 100 m backstroke |
Summer Universiade
| Gold medal – first place | 1987 Zagreb | 4x100 m medley |
| Silver medal – second place | 1987 Zagreb | 100 m backstroke |

David "Dave" Charles Berkoff (born November 30, 1966) is an American former competition Hall of Fame swimmer, Olympic champion, and former world record-holder in two events. Berkoff was a backstroke specialist who won a total of four medals during his career at the Olympic Games in 1988 and 1992. He is best known for breaking the world record for the 100-meter backstroke three times, beginning at the 1988 Olympic trial preliminaries, becoming the first swimmer to go under 55 seconds for the event. He is also remembered for his powerful underwater backstroke start, the eponymous "Berkoff Blastoff" which after a strong push-off from the side of the pool used a horizontal body position with locked arms outstretched overhead and an undulating or wavelike aerodynamic dolphin kick to provide thrust and build speed.

== Biography ==
Remaining consistent with his swim training, Berkoff swam for a number of clubs in the greater Philadelphia area from a young age. He began swimming with Dick Shoulberg's Germantown Academy Aquatics Club in Fort Washington, Pennsylvania outside Philadelphia when he was only eight years old around 1974. He eventually swam for the prestigious Foxcatcher Swim Club which Coach Jack Simon, who also coached Berkoff, moved to West Chester, Southwest of Fort Washington, in the early 1980s, when Berkoff was in his high school years. Jack Simon continued to coach Foxcatcher through around 1985. Dick Shoulberg coached the Germantown Academy Aquatics Club from 1969 to 1985, but the club changed its name to the Foxcatcher Swim Club from 1985 to 2000 when it merged with Foxcatcher.

Berkoff attended and swam for the William Penn Charter School and around the age of 15 broke the swimming team's pool record for the 100-yard backstroke in a 1982 meet against St. Joseph's Prep with a time of 1:02.10. His time showed great promise, but not a national record. With hard work and attention to technique, Berkoff would greatly improve on his backstroke times. Stroke technique, strength training, and arduous workouts were all part of Berkoff's club Coach Dick Shoulberg's focuses.

In February 1982, representing Penn Charter, Berkoff won the 100-yard backstroke with an improved time of 56.3 in the Inter-Academic League Championships, and though Penn Charter sponsored the meet, they lost to Germantown Academy.

=== Harvard era swimming ===
In 1985, he was accepted at Cambridge's Harvard University and swam for their swim team where he was managed by Coach Joe Bernal. He also swam for Bernal's Gator Swim Club during this period.

He had two NCAA National Championship swims during his Harvard years, one in his signature stroke, the 100-yard backstroke at the NCAA nationals at the University of Texas in 1987 where he won the event, with a time of :48.2, breaking the NCAA standing record. That year, he notably became Harvard's first NCAA National Champion since 1960. Improving slightly on his time, two years later, on March 31, 1989, Berkoff again won the 100-yard backstroke event at the NCAA championships in Indianapolis with an American and U.S. Open Record time of :47.02. He graduated Harvard that year with a degree in anthropology.

Known later as the "Berkoff Blastoff", early in his Harvard career, Berkoff began swimming his backstroke start and turns underwater for a distance as long as 35 meters using a powerful push-off from the side of the pool remaining horizontal and as aerodynamic as possible, with a powerful wavelike dolphin kick and outstretched locked arms for the starts and turns. Above water, while on his back Berkoff's arms entered the water fairly straight and outstretched above his head, but after the catch phase moved toward the body ending with a pulling forward motion with bent elbows. The lengthy underwater start and turn would become controversial with officials, but lead Berkoff to faster times until the rules changed in 1988.

=== 1988 Olympic trials world record ===
At the Olympic Trials on August 13, 1988, Berkoff swam a 54.95 for the 100-meter backstroke preliminaries breaking Igor Poliansky's (URS) 100-meter backstroke world record and again broke the world record in the Olympic Trial finals with a 54.91. He became the first swimmer to go under 55 seconds for the event.

=== 1988 Seoul Olympic world record ===
At the October 1988 Summer Olympics in Seoul, South Korea, he won a gold medal by swimming the backstroke leg for the winning U.S. men's team in the men's 4×100-meter medley relay in the event final with a World record time of 3:36.93.

He broke the 100-meter backstroke event world record a third time at the 1988 Seoul Olympics preliminary heat with a 54.51, but could not match the time in the men's 100-meter backstroke event final where he swam a 55.18, placing him second in the event, and capturing the silver medal.

==== Berkoff's impact ====
After the 1988 Olympics, a limit of 10 meters was initially set for a few years by FINA officials for the distance a backstroker could swim underwater at their starts and turns, but the use of the underwater dolphin kick at starts and turns with outstretched locked arms would be adopted by a great number of competitive backstroke swimmers as well as butterfly and freestyle swimmers. Prior to Berkoff's innovation, many or most backstroke and freestyle swimmers used the flutter kick during the underwater phase of their starts and turns. In 1991, and remaining as of 2022, the distance limit increased to 15 meters at the start and after the turns for backstrokers, butterfly and freestyle swimmers. The limit for backstrokers of 15 meters for backstroke swimmers was set as early as 1989.

Berkoff, along with Olympians Dan Jorgensen, Sean Killian and Dave Wharton trained with Dick Shoulberg at Pennsylvania's Germantown Academy Aquatics Club in Fort Washington outside Philadelphia and Foxcatcher Swim Club in nearby Newtown Square for the 1992 swim season in preparation for the Olympics. Shoulberg had coached a number of stroke and IM competitors, besides Berfkoff, and had written a chapter on Individual Medley Training for The Swim Coaches Bible.

=== 1992 Barcelona Olympics ===
At the 1992 Summer Olympics in Barcelona, Spain, where Shoulberg was an Assistant Coach, Berkoff earned another gold medal by swimming for the winning U.S. team in the preliminary heats of the men's 4×100-meter medley relay. He also won a bronze medal by placing third in the 100-meter backstroke with a time of 54.78.

=== International competition ===
In the 1987 Pan American games, Berkoff took a silver in the 100-meter backstroke. He won three United States Swimming National Championships; one in the 100-yard backstroke in 1988, and 1991, and one in the 100-meter backstroke in 1988. At the 1987 Summer Universiade in Zagreb, Berkoff won a gold in the 4x100 Medley Relay, and a silver in the 100-meter backstroke.

Berkoff was inducted into the International Swimming Hall of Fame as an "Honor Swimmer" in 2005. Despite never winning an individual Olympic gold medal, he dominated the 100-yard and meter backstroke in NCAA and International competition and his innovative starts and turns influenced many top competitive swimmers. He has also had success as a swim coach.

=== Professional life and coaching ===
Beginning his studies in the fall of 1992, after his competitive swimming career, he eventually received a master's degree in Environmental Science and a Juris Doctor degree from the University of Montana. Berkoff married Shirley Gustafson, and had two children. As a Missoula attorney, he covers insurance coverage issues and defendants in civil litigation.

In 2010, Berkoff accepted a position as technical vice-president of USA Swimming, working as a volunteer, and had worked on a swimming advisory board while in college. He has coached the Missoula Aquatic Club for many years, and in 2016, two of his swimmers, his 15-year-old daughter Katharine and 19-year-old Hannah Leach, were both scheduled to attend the June 2016 Olympic trials in Omaha Nebraska, competing in the 100 and 200 backstroke events. Berkoff coached two other of his swimmers to the Olympic trials in backstroke, Major Robinson (2012) and David Cromwell (2008). During his graduate work, he continued with athletics as a highly rated competitive triathlete. He is a co-founder of the Delphys Foundation for Marine Study, with Olympian Matt Biondi. Delphys is specifically tasked with the study of whales and dolphins in their natural ocean settings.

== See also ==
- List of members of the International Swimming Hall of Fame
- List of Olympic medalists in swimming (men)
- World record progression 100 metres backstroke
- World record progression 4 × 100 metres medley relay

Records
| Preceded by Igor Polyansky | Men's 100-meter backstroke world record-holder (long course); August 12, 1988 – August 25, 1991 | Succeeded by Jeff Rouse |
