= Ernesto Vela =

Mexican swimmer (born 1968)

Personal information
- Born: October 20, 1968 (age 57)

Sport
- Sport: Swimming
- Strokes: Backstroke
Medal record
Representing Mexico
Central American and Caribbean Games
Gold medal – first place	1986 Santiago	200m backstroke

Ernesto Vela (born 20 October 1968) is a Mexican former swimmer Olympian.

== International competition ==
=== Summer Olympics ===
He competed at two consecutive Summer Olympic Games. The first Games were the 1984 Summer Olympics in Los Angeles, California, United States, as part of the Mexico swimming team. The second Games were the 1988 Summer Olympics in Seoul, South Korea, as part of the Mexico swimming team. No one on the ten member team at Seoul finished above the "heat" stage of competition.
