= Swimming at the 1984 Summer Olympics – Women's 100 metre freestyle =

Women's 100 metre freestyle at the Games of the XXIII Olympiad
- Venue: McDonald's Olympic Swim Stadium
- Date: 29 July 1984 (heats & final)
- Competitors: 45 from 30 nations
- Winning time: 55.92

Medalists
1st place, gold medalist(s)		Nancy Hogshead	United States
1st place, gold medalist(s)		Carrie Steinseifer	United States
3rd place, bronze medalist(s)		Annemarie Verstappen	Netherlands

The final of the women's 100 metre freestyle event at the 1984 Summer Olympics was held in the McDonald's Olympic Swim Stadium in Los Angeles, California, on July 29, 1984.

== Records ==
Prior to this competition, the existing world and Olympic records were as follows.

World record	Barbara Krause (GDR)	54.79	Moscow, Soviet Union	21 July 1980
Olympic record	Barbara Krause (GDR)	54.79	Moscow, Soviet Union	21 July 1980

== Results ==
=== Heats ===
Rule: The eight fastest swimmers advance to final A (Q), while the next eight to final B (q).

Rank	Heat	Lane	Name	Nationality	Time	Notes
1	6	4	Nancy Hogshead	United States	55.85	Q
2	2	4	Annemarie Verstappen	Netherlands	56.11	Q
3	3	4	Carrie Steinseifer	United States	56.46	Q
4	4	3	Michelle Pearson	Australia	56.75	Q, OC
5	3	5	Susanne Schuster	West Germany	56.85	Q
6	4	4	Conny van Bentum	Netherlands	56.94	Q
7	5	4	June Croft	Great Britain	57.12	Q
8	6	5	Angela Russell	Australia	57.30	Q
9	1	5	Iris Zscherpe	West Germany	57.31	q
10	4	5	Pamela Rai	Canada	57.41	q
11	1	3	Sophie Kamoun	France	57.49	q
12	2	3	Silvia Persi	Italy	57.62	q
13	5	5	Nicola Fibbens	Great Britain	57.80	q
14	5	3	Maria Kardum	Sweden	58.22	q
15	6	3	Agneta Eriksson	Sweden	58.43	q
16	2	5	Jane Kerr	Canada	58.46	q
17	1	4	Kaori Yanase	Japan	58.47	
18	3	3	Maarit Vähäsaari-Sihvonen	Finland	58.51	
19	3	6	Marie-Thérèse Armentero	Switzerland	58.73	
20	4	6	Patricia Kohlmann	Mexico	58.76	
21	5	6	Chikako Nakamori	Japan	59.00	
22	3	7	Ding Jilian	China	59.11	
23	2	6	Sofia Dara	Greece	59.25	
24	6	2	Grazia Colombo	Italy	59.43	
25	1	6	Teresa Rivera	Mexico	59.61	
26	6	7	Yan Hong	China	1:00.45	
27	6	6	Virginia Sachero	Argentina	1:00.53	
28	2	2	Carmel Clark	New Zealand	1:00.63	
29	5	2	Shelley Cramer	Virgin Islands	1:00.65	
30	4	7	Kim Jin-suk	South Korea	1:00.91	
31	4	2	Sandra Crousse	Peru	1:01.02	
32	2	7	Kathy Wong	Hong Kong	1:01.03	
33	5	7	Carol Ann Heavey	Ireland	1:01.34	
34	3	2	Fenella Ng	Hong Kong	1:01.82	
35	1	2	Faten Ghattas	Tunisia	1:02.00	
36	5	1	Christine Jacob	Philippines	1:02.43	
37	2	1	Blanca Morales	Guatemala	1:02.48	
38	6	1	Helen Chow	Malaysia	1:02.53	
39	1	7	Anna Doig	New Zealand	1:02.72	
40	4	1	Sherwite Hafez	Egypt	1:02.78	
41	5	8	Karen Slowing-Aceituno	Guatemala	1:03.46	
42	3	1	Nevine Hafez	Egypt	1:04.06	
43	1	1	Sharon Pickering	Fiji	1:04.25	
44	6	8	Daniela Galassi	San Marino	1:06.19	
45	4	8	María Lardizábal	Honduras	1:07.80	

=== Finals ===
==== Final B ====
Rank	Lane	Name	Nationality	Time	Notes
9	4	Iris Zscherpe	West Germany	57.19	
10	6	Silvia Persi	Italy	57.24	
11	2	Nicola Fibbens	Great Britain	57.36	
12	5	Pamela Rai	Canada	57.56	
13	3	Sophie Kamoun	France	57.81	
14	8	Jane Kerr	Canada	57.85	
15	1	Agneta Eriksson	Sweden	58.08	
16	7	Maria Kardum	Sweden	58.12	

==== Final A ====
Rank	Lane	Name	Nationality	Time	Notes
1st place, gold medalist(s)	4	Nancy Hogshead	United States	55.92	
1st place, gold medalist(s)	3	Carrie Steinseifer	United States	55.92	
3rd place, bronze medalist(s)	5	Annemarie Verstappen	Netherlands	56.08	
4	7	Conny van Bentum	Netherlands	56.43	
5	6	Michelle Pearson	Australia	56.83	
6	1	June Croft	Great Britain	56.90	
7	2	Susanne Schuster	West Germany	57.11	
8	8	Angela Russell	Australia	58.09	
