= Swimming at the 1984 Summer Olympics – Women's 4 × 100 metre medley relay =

Women's 4 × 100 metre medley relay at the Games of the XXIII Olympiad
- Venue: McDonald's Olympic Swim Stadium
- Date: 3 August 1984 (heats & final)
- Competitors: 52 from 13 nations
- Teams: 13
- Winning time: 4:08.34

Medalists
| 1st place, gold medalist(s) | | Theresa Andrews, Tracy Caulkins, Mary T. Meagher, Nancy Hogshead, Betsy Mitchell*, Susan Rapp*, Jenna Johnson*, Carrie Steinseifer* | United States |
| 2nd place, silver medalist(s) | | Svenja Schlicht, Ute Hasse, Ina Beyermann, Karin Seick | West Germany |
| 3rd place, bronze medalist(s) | | Reema Abdo, Anne Ottenbrite, Michelle MacPherson, Pamela Rai; *Indicates the swimmer only competed in the preliminary heats. | Canada |

The final of the women's 4 × 100 metre medley relay event at the 1984 Summer Olympics was held in Los Angeles, California, on August 3, 1984.

== Records ==
Prior to this competition, the existing world and Olympic records were as follows.

| World record | East Germany (GDR); Ina Kleber (1:01.79); Ute Geweniger (1:09.16); Ines Geißler (1:00.09); Birgit Meineke (54.75) | 4:05.79 | Rome, Italy | 26 August 1983 |
| Olympic record | East Germany; Rica Reinisch (1:01.51); Ute Geweniger (1:09.46); Andrea Pollack (1:00.14); Caren Metschuck (55.56) | 4:06.67 | Moscow, Soviet Union | 20 July 1980 |

== Results ==
=== Heats ===
Rule: The eight fastest teams advance to the final (Q).

| Rank | Heat | Lane | Nation | Swimmers | Time | Notes |
|---|---|---|---|---|---|---|
| 1 | 2 | 4 | United States | Betsy Mitchell (1:02.56); Susan Rapp (1:11.49); Jenna Johnson (59.37); Carrie Steinseifer (55.81) | 4:09.23 | Q |
| 2 | 2 | 5 | West Germany | Svenja Schlicht (1:03.55); Ute Hasse (1:11.72); Ina Beyermann (1:01.91); Karin Seick (56.40) | 4:13.58 | Q |
| 3 | 1 | 5 | Canada | Reema Abdo (1:04.97); Anne Ottenbrite (1:11.72); Michelle MacPherson (1:02.31); Pamela Rai (56.70) | 4:15.70 | Q |
| 4 | 2 | 2 | Great Britain | Beverley Rose (1:04.81); Jean Hill (1:13.23); Nicola Fibbens (1:02.03); June Croft (56.76) | 4:16.83 | Q |
| 5 | 2 | 3 | Japan | Naomi Sekido (1:05.86); Hiroko Nagasaki (1:12.04); Naoko Kume (1:01.74); Kaori Yanase (57.95) | 4:17.59 | Q |
| 6 | 1 | 3 | Sweden | Anna-Karin Eriksson (1:05.33); Eva-Marie Håkansson (1:12.21); Agneta Eriksson (1:02.23); Maria Kardum (57.88) | 4:17.65 | Q |
| 7 | 1 | 6 | Italy | Manuela Carosi (1:05.08); Manuela Dalla Valle (1:11.80); Roberta Lanzarotti (1:03.56); Silvia Persi (57.46) | 4:17.90 | Q |
| 8 | 1 | 2 | Switzerland | Eva Gysling (1:05.80); Patricia Brülhart (1:12.67); Carole Brook (1:03.73); Marie-Thérèse Armentero (58.35) | 4:20.55 | Q |
| 9 | 1 | 7 | China | Guo Huaying (1:09.92); Liang Weifen (1:14.83); Li Jinlan (1:03.38); Ding Jilian (59.26) | 4:27.39 | |
| 10 | 1 | 1 | Hong Kong | Lotta Flink (1:09.78); Chow Lai Yee (1:19.45); Kathy Wong (1:06.70); Fenella Ng (1:02.69) | 4:38.62 | |
| | 1 | 4 | Netherlands | Jolanda de Rover (1:03.73); Petra van Staveren (1:10.58); Annemarie Verstappen (1:00.61); Desi Reijers | DSQ | |
| | 2 | 6 | Australia | Audrey Moore (1:04.61); Dimity Douglas (1:12.16); Lisa Curry (1:02.69); Angela Russell | DSQ | |
| | 2 | 7 | Mexico | Teresa Rivera (1:06.39); Sara Guido (1:14.97); Maria Urbina (1:06.75); Patricia Kohlmann | DSQ | |

=== Final ===
| Rank | Lane | Nation | Swimmers | Time | Notes |
|---|---|---|---|---|---|
| 1st place, gold medalist(s) | 4 | United States | Theresa Andrews (1:04.00); Tracy Caulkins (1:11.03); Mary T. Meagher (58.04); Nancy Hogshead (55.27) | 4:08.34 | |
| 2nd place, silver medalist(s) | 5 | West Germany | Svenja Schlicht (1:03.20); Ute Hasse (1:11.49); Ina Beyermann (1:01.27); Karin Seick (56.01) | 4:11.97 | NR |
| 3rd place, bronze medalist(s) | 3 | Canada | Reema Abdo (1:04.19); Anne Ottenbrite (1:10.87); Michelle MacPherson (1:01.28); Pamela Rai (56.64) | 4:12.98 | NR |
| 4 | 6 | Great Britain | Beverley Rose (1:04.14); Jean Hill (1:12.00); Nicola Fibbens (1:01.83); June Croft (56.08) | 4:14.05 | |
| 5 | 1 | Italy | Manuela Carosi (1:05.48); Manuela Dalla Valle (1:11.32); Roberta Lanzarotti (1:03.50); Silvia Persi (57.10) | 4:17.40 | |
| 6 | 8 | Switzerland | Eva Gysling (1:05.61); Patricia Brülhart (1:12.59); Carole Brook (1:03.07); Marie-Thérèse Armentero (57.75) | 4:19.02 | |
| | 2 | Japan | Naomi Sekido (1:05.67); Hiroko Nagasaki (1:12.09); Naoko Kume; Kaori Yanase | DSQ | |
| | 7 | Sweden | Anna-Karin Eriksson (1:05.70); Eva-Marie Håkansson; Agneta Eriksson; Maria Kardum | DSQ | |
