= Swimming at the 1984 Summer Olympics – Women's 200 metre freestyle =

Women's 200 metre freestyle at the Games of the XXIII Olympiad
- Venue: McDonald's Olympic Swim Stadium
- Date: 30 July 1984 (heats & final)
- Competitors: 38 from 26 nations
- Winning time: 1:59.23

Medalists
1st place, gold medalist(s)		Mary Wayte	United States
2nd place, silver medalist(s)		Cynthia Woodhead	United States
3rd place, bronze medalist(s)		Annemarie Verstappen	Netherlands

The final of the women's 200 metre freestyle event at the 1984 Summer Olympics was held in the McDonald's Olympic Swim Stadium in Los Angeles, California, on July 30, 1984.

== Records ==
Prior to this competition, the existing world and Olympic records were as follows.

World record	Kristin Otto (GDR)	1:57.75	Magdeburg, East Germany	23 May 1984
Olympic record	Barbara Krause (GDR)	1:58.33	Moscow, Soviet Union	24 July 1980

== Results ==
=== Heats ===
Rule: The eight fastest swimmers advance to final A (Q), while the next eight to final B (q).

Rank	Heat	Lane	Name	Nationality	Time	Notes
1	3	4	Mary Wayte	United States	2:00.69	Q
2	4	4	Cynthia Woodhead	United States	2:00.85	Q
3	5	4	June Croft	Great Britain	2:01.05	Q
4	3	5	Michelle Pearson	Australia	2:01.49	Q
5	2	4	Conny van Bentum	Netherlands	2:01.52	Q
6	1	4	Annemarie Verstappen	Netherlands	2:01.61	Q
7	5	5	Ina Beyermann	West Germany	2:02.42	Q
8	3	3	Anna McVann	Australia	2:03.14	Q
9	5	3	Julie Daigneault	Canada	2:03.40	q
10	4	6	Chikako Nakamori	Japan	2:03.94	q
11	3	6	Iris Zscherpe	West Germany	2:03.95	q
12	2	3	Silvia Persi	Italy	2:03.98	q
13	4	3	Jane Kerr	Canada	2:04.02	q
14	4	5	Kaori Yanase	Japan	2:04.38	q
15	2	5	Annabelle Cripps	Great Britain	2:04.44	q
16	1	5	Ann Linder	Sweden	2:04.60	q
17	2	6	Carla Lasi	Italy	2:05.86	
18	2	7	Lisa Ann Wen	Chinese Taipei	2:06.01	
19	1	3	Laurence Bensimon	France	2:06.61	
20	2	2	Carol Ann Heavey	Ireland	2:07.75	
21	5	2	Patricia Kohlmann	Mexico	2:08.15	
22	5	7	Sandra Crousse	Peru	2:09.42	
23	1	6	Sofia Dara	Greece	2:09.52	
24	4	2	Irma Huerta	Mexico	2:09.79	
25	4	1	Christine Jacob	Philippines	2:12.17	
26	3	7	Hadar Rubinstein	Israel	2:12.32	
27	3	2	Virginia Sachero	Argentina	2:13.41	
28	5	1	Chang Hui-chien	Chinese Taipei	2:13.67	
29	1	7	Kim Jin-suk	South Korea	2:13.76	
30	1	2	Fenella Ng	Hong Kong	2:13.94	
31	2	1	Karen Slowing-Aceituno	Guatemala	2:14.39	
32	4	8	Blanca Morales	Guatemala	2:14.79	
33	3	1	Sherwite Hafez	Egypt	2:16.11	
34	1	1	Daniela Galassi	San Marino	2:19.22	
35	5	8	Sharon Pickering	Fiji	2:19.61	
36	3	8	María Lardizábal	Honduras	2:28.65	
	4	7	Faten Ghattas	Tunisia	DNS	
	5	6	Maria Kardum	Sweden	DNS	

=== Finals ===
==== Final B ====
Rank	Lane	Name	Nationality	Time	Notes
9	6	Silvia Persi	Italy	2:03.17	NR
10	3	Iris Zscherpe	West Germany	2:03.42	
11	4	Julie Daigneault	Canada	2:03.67	
12	8	Ann Linder	Sweden	2:03.85	
13	5	Chikako Nakamori	Japan	2:04.11	
14	2	Jane Kerr	Canada	2:04.19	
15	1	Annabelle Cripps	Great Britain	2:04.90	
16	7	Kaori Yanase	Japan	2:05.24	

==== Final A ====
Rank	Lane	Name	Nationality	Time	Notes
1st place, gold medalist(s)	4	Mary Wayte	United States	1:59.23	
2nd place, silver medalist(s)	5	Cynthia Woodhead	United States	1:59.50	
3rd place, bronze medalist(s)	7	Annemarie Verstappen	Netherlands	1:59.69	
4	6	Michelle Pearson	Australia	1:59.79	OC
5	2	Conny van Bentum	Netherlands	2:00.59	
6	3	June Croft	Great Britain	2:00.64	
7	1	Ina Beyermann	West Germany	2:01.89	
8	8	Anna McVann	Australia	2:02.87	
