= Swimming at the 1984 Summer Olympics – Women's 100 metre butterfly =

Women's 100 metre butterfly at the Games of the XXIII Olympiad
- Venue: McDonald's Olympic Swim Stadium
- Date: 2 August 1984 (heats & final)
- Competitors: 36 from 24 nations
- Winning time: 59.26

Medalists
1st place, gold medalist(s)		Mary T. Meagher	United States
2nd place, silver medalist(s)		Jenna Johnson	United States
3rd place, bronze medalist(s)		Karin Seick	West Germany

The final of the women's 100 metre butterfly event at the 1984 Summer Olympics was held in the McDonald's Olympic Swim Stadium in Los Angeles, California, on August 2, 1984.

== Records ==
Prior to this competition, the existing world and Olympic records were as follows.

World record	Mary T. Meagher (USA)	57.93	Brown Deer, United States	16 August 1981
Olympic record	Kornelia Ender (GDR)	1:00.13	Montreal, Canada	22 July 1976

The following records were established during the competition:

Date	Round	Name	Nation	Time	Record
2 August	Heat 4	Mary T. Meagher	United States	59.05	OR

== Results ==
=== Heats ===
Rule: The eight fastest swimmers advance to final A (Q), while the next eight to final B (q).

Rank	Heat	Lane	Name	Nationality	Time	Notes
1	4	4	Mary T. Meagher	United States	59.05	Q, OR
2	5	4	Jenna Johnson	United States	59.99	Q
3	5	5	Annemarie Verstappen	Netherlands	1:01.50	Q
4	3	5	Michelle MacPherson	Canada	1:01.57	Q
5	4	5	Janet Tibbits	Australia	1:01.97	Q
6	2	5	Conny van Bentum	Netherlands	1:02.01	Q
7	2	4	Karin Seick	West Germany	1:02.21	Q
8	3	6	Ina Beyermann	West Germany	1:02.36	Q
9	1	4	Lisa Curry-Kenny	Australia	1:02.47	q
10	1	5	Kiyomi Takahashi	Japan	1:02.79	q
11	2	3	Agneta Eriksson	Sweden	1:02.97	q
12	4	3	Nicola Fibbens	Great Britain	1:02.98	q
13	5	3	Ann Osgerby	Great Britain	1:03.09	q
14	1	3	Anna Doig	New Zealand	1:03.15	q
15	4	6	Sonja Hausladen	Austria	1:03.20	q
16	3	4	Takemi Ise	Japan	1:03.37	q
17	1	6	Agneta Mårtensson	Sweden	1:03.84	
17	3	3	Marie Moore	Canada	1:03.84	
19	3	2	Roberta Lanzarotti	Italy	1:03.88	
20	4	2	Li Jinlan	China	1:03.97	
21	5	6	Carole Brook	Switzerland	1:03.99	
22	2	6	Shelley Cramer	Virgin Islands	1:04.43	
23	2	2	Brigitte Wanderer	Austria	1:05.22	
24	5	2	Cristina Quintarelli	Italy	1:05.35	
25	3	7	Faten Ghattas	Tunisia	1:05.91	
26	4	7	Karin Brandes	Peru	1:05.96	
27	2	7	Julie Parkes	Ireland	1:06.20	
28	5	1	María Urbina	Mexico	1:06.65	
29	5	7	Jodie Lawaetz	Virgin Islands	1:06.82	
30	4	1	Blanca Morales	Guatemala	1:06.99	
31	1	7	Kathy Wong	Hong Kong	1:07.25	
32	3	1	Nevine Hafez	Egypt	1:10.45	
33	2	1	Karen Slowing-Aceituno	Guatemala	1:10.68	
34	1	1	Sharon Pickering	Fiji	1:11.49	
35	5	8	Daniela Galassi	San Marino	1:16.82	
	1	2	Hadar Rubinstein	Israel	DNS	

=== Finals ===
==== Final B ====
Rank	Lane	Name	Nationality	Time	Notes
9	4	Lisa Curry-Kenny	Australia	1:01.25	
10	6	Nicola Fibbens	Great Britain	1:01.48	NR
11	5	Kiyomi Takahashi	Japan	1:02.55	
12	3	Agneta Eriksson	Sweden	1:02.64	
13	2	Ann Osgerby	Great Britain	1:02.98	
14	8	Takemi Ise	Japan	1:03.33	
15	1	Sonja Hausladen	Austria	1:03.37	
16	7	Anna Doig	New Zealand	1:03.65	

==== Final A ====
Rank	Lane	Name	Nationality	Time	Notes
1st place, gold medalist(s)	4	Mary T. Meagher	United States	59.26	
2nd place, silver medalist(s)	5	Jenna Johnson	United States	1:00.19	
3rd place, bronze medalist(s)	1	Karin Seick	West Germany	1:01.36	
4	3	Annemarie Verstappen	Netherlands	1:01.56	
5	6	Michelle MacPherson	Canada	1:01.58	
6	2	Janet Tibbits	Australia	1:01.78	
7	7	Conny van Bentum	Netherlands	1:01.94	
8	8	Ina Beyermann	West Germany	1:02.11	
