= Swimming at the 1984 Summer Olympics – Women's 200 metre individual medley =

Women's 200 metre individual medley at the Games of the XXIII Olympiad
- Venue: McDonald's Olympic Swim Stadium
- Date: 3 August 1984 (heats & final)
- Competitors: 30 from 22 nations
- Winning time: 2:12.64 OR

Medalists
1st place, gold medalist(s)		Tracy Caulkins	United States
2nd place, silver medalist(s)		Nancy Hogshead	United States
3rd place, bronze medalist(s)		Michelle Pearson	Australia

The final of the women's 200 metre individual medley event at the 1984 Summer Olympics was held in the McDonald's Olympic Swim Stadium in Los Angeles, California, on August 3, 1984.

The event was reintroduced to the Olympic program after a 12-year absence.

== Records ==
Prior to this competition, the existing world and Olympic records were as follows.

World record	Ute Geweniger (GDR)	2:11.73	Magdeburg, East Germany	4 July 1981
Olympic record	Shane Gould (AUS)	2:23.07	Munich, West Germany	28 August 1972

The following records were established during the competition:

Date	Round	Name	Nation	Time	Record
3 August	Heat 4	Tracy Caulkins	United States	2:14.47	OR
3 August	Final A	Tracy Caulkins	United States	2:12.64	OR

== Results ==
=== Heats ===
Rule: The eight fastest swimmers advance to final A (Q), while the next eight to final B (q).

Rank	Heat	Lane	Name	Nationality	Time	Notes
1	4	4	Tracy Caulkins	United States	2:14.47	Q, OR
2	3	4	Nancy Hogshead	United States	2:16.29	Q
3	3	5	Michelle Pearson	Australia	2:17.46	Q
4	1	5	Christiane Pielke	West Germany	2:19.17	Q, NR
5	4	3	Kathrine Bomstad	Norway	2:19.88	Q, NR
6	4	5	Petra Zindler	West Germany	2:20.05	Q
7	3	3	Manuela Dalla Valle	Italy	2:20.50	Q
8	2	4	Lisa Curry-Kenny	Australia	2:20.57	Q
9	1	4	Michelle MacPherson	Canada	2:20.68	q
10	2	5	Alison Dozzo	Canada	2:20.85	q
11	3	6	Maarit Vähäsaari-Sihvonen	Finland	2:21.05	q
12	2	6	Anette Philipsson	Sweden	2:21.70	q
13	4	8	Sabine Pauwels	Belgium	2:22.86	q, WD
14	4	6	Maria Kardum	Sweden	2:22.87	q, WD
15	4	7	Hideka Koshimizu	Japan	2:23.38	q
16	2	3	Zara Long	Great Britain	2:23.89	q
17	1	3	Laurence Bensimon	France	2:24.34	q
18	1	6	Gaynor Stanley	Great Britain	2:24.94	q
19	1	2	Gail Jonson	New Zealand	2:25.00	
20	2	2	Brigitte Wanderer	Austria	2:26.85	
21	2	7	Yan Hong	China	2:27.95	
22	3	1	Helen Chow	Malaysia	2:29.25	
23	1	7	Faten Ghattas	Tunisia	2:29.77	
24	3	7	Karin Brandes	Peru	2:29.87	
25	2	1	Lotta Flink	Hong Kong	2:31.70	
26	1	1	Sharon Pickering	Fiji	2:34.77	
27	4	1	Blanca Morales	Guatemala	2:38.16	
	3	2	Silvia Persi	Italy	DNS	
	3	8	Rosa María Silva	Uruguay	DNS	
	4	2	Beda Leirvaag	Norway	DNS	

=== Finals ===
==== Final B ====
Rank	Lane	Name	Nationality	Time	Notes
9	3	Maarit Vähäsaari-Sihvonen	Finland	2:19.27	NR
10	4	Michelle MacPherson	Canada	2:19.34	
11	5	Alison Dozzo	Canada	2:19.70	
12	6	Anette Philipsson	Sweden	2:21.54	
13	8	Gaynor Stanley	Great Britain	2:21.71	
14	7	Zara Long	Great Britain	2:22.25	
15	2	Hideka Koshimizu	Japan	2:22.81	
16	1	Laurence Bensimon	France	2:27.13	

==== Final A ====
Rank	Lane	Name	Nationality	Time	Notes
1st place, gold medalist(s)	4	Tracy Caulkins	United States	2:12.64	OR
2nd place, silver medalist(s)	5	Nancy Hogshead	United States	2:15.17	
3rd place, bronze medalist(s)	3	Michelle Pearson	Australia	2:15.92	OC
4	8	Lisa Curry-Kenny	Australia	2:16.75	
5	6	Christiane Pielke	West Germany	2:17.82	NR
6	1	Manuela Dalla Valle	Italy	2:19.69	
7	7	Petra Zindler	West Germany	2:19.86	
8	2	Kathrine Bomstad	Norway	2:20.48	
