= Swimming at the 1984 Summer Olympics – Women's 4 × 100 metre freestyle relay =

Women's 4 × 100 metre freestyle relay at the Games of the XXIII Olympiad
- Venue: McDonald's Olympic Swim Stadium
- Date: 31 July 1984 (heats & final)
- Competitors: 54 from 12 nations
- Teams: 12
- Winning time: 3:43.43 AM

Medalists
1st place, gold medalist(s)		Jenna Johnson, Carrie Steinseifer, Dara Torres, Nancy Hogshead, Jill Sterkel*, Mary Wayte*	United States
2nd place, silver medalist(s)		Annemarie Verstappen, Elles Voskes, Desi Reijers, Conny van Bentum, Wilma van Velsen*	Netherlands
3rd place, bronze medalist(s)		Iris Zscherpe, Susanne Schuster, Christiane Pielke, Karin Seick; *Indicates the swimmer only competed in the preliminary heats.	West Germany

The final of the women's 4 × 100 metre freestyle relay event at the 1984 Summer Olympics was held in Los Angeles, California, on July 31, 1984.

== Records ==
Prior to this competition, the existing world and Olympic records were as follows.

World record	East Germany (GDR); Barbara Krause (54.90); Caren Metschuck (55.61); Ines Diers (55.90); Sarina Hülsenbeck (56.30)	3:42.71	Moscow, Soviet Union	27 July 1980
Olympic record	East Germany; Barbara Krause (54.90); Caren Metschuck (55.61); Ines Diers (55.90); Sarina Hülsenbeck (56.30)	3:42.71	Moscow, Soviet Union	27 July 1980

== Results ==
=== Heats ===
Rule: The eight fastest teams advance to the final (Q).

Rank	Heat	Lane	Nation	Swimmers	Time	Notes
1	2	4	United States	Dara Torres (56.88); Jill Sterkel (55.42); Jenna Johnson (55.63); Mary Wayte (55.63)	3:43.56	Q, AM
2	1	4	West Germany	Iris Zscherpe (57.04); Susanne Schuster (56.50); Christiane Pielke (56.90); Karin Seick (56.05)	3:46.49	Q, NR
3	2	5	Netherlands	Annemarie Verstappen (56.30); Elles Voskes (56.98); Desi Reijers (56.80); Wilma van Velsen (57.57)	3:47.65	Q
4	1	6	Australia	Lisa Curry (57.79); Angela Russell (57.11); Janet Tibbits (58.16); Michelle Pearson (56.55)	3:49.61	Q
5	2	3	Canada	Jane Kerr (57.82); Maureen New (57.66); Cheryl McArton (57.48); Carol Klimpel (57.44)	3:50.40	Q
6	2	6	Great Britain	Annabelle Cripps (58.67); Nicola Fibbens (57.24); Debra Gore (58.50); June Croft (57.06)	3:51.47	Q
7	1	5	Sweden	Maria Kardum (58.32); Agneta Eriksson (56.92); Petra Hildér (58.18); Malin Rundgren (58.85)	3:52.27	Q
8	1	3	France	Sophie Kamoun (58.40); Carole Amoric (57.74); Laurence Bensimon (58.74); Véronique Jardin (57.79)	3:52.67	Q
9	2	7	Italy	Monica Olmi (59.02); Silvia Persi (57.02); Grazia Colombo (58.40); Manuela Dalla Valle (58.45)	3:52.89	NR
10	2	2	Japan	Junko Sakurai (59.18); Chikako Nakamori (58.15); Miki Saito (58.98); Kaori Yanase (58.37)	3:54.68	
11	1	2	Mexico	Patricia Kohlmann (58.58); Teresa Rivera (59.01); Rosa Fuentes (1:00.80); Irma Huerta (59.92)	3:58.31	
12	1	7	Hong Kong	Kathy Wong (1:00.67); Fenella Ng (1:02.51); Lotta Flink (1:03.61); Chow Lai Yee (1:05.84)	4:12.63	

=== Final ===
Rank	Lane	Nation	Swimmers	Time	Notes
1st place, gold medalist(s)	4	United States	Jenna Johnson (56.46); Carrie Steinseifer (55.87); Dara Torres (55.92); Nancy Hogshead (55.18)	3:43.43	AM
2nd place, silver medalist(s)	3	Netherlands	Annemarie Verstappen (55.94); Elles Voskes (56.77); Desi Reijers (55.62); Conny van Bentum (56.07)	3:44.40	NR
3rd place, bronze medalist(s)	5	West Germany	Iris Zscherpe (57.26); Susanne Schuster (56.32); Christiane Pielke (56.24); Karin Seick (55.74)	3:45.56	NR
4	6	Australia	Michelle Pearson (56.51); Angela Russell (56.97); Anna McVann (58.26); Lisa Curry (56.05)	3:47.79	OC
5	2	Canada	Pamela Rai (57.70); Carol Klimpel (57.47); Cheryl McArton (57.52); Jane Kerr (56.81)	3:49.50	
6	7	Great Britain	June Croft (57.49); Nicola Fibbens (57.33); Debra Gore (57.24); Annabelle Cripps (58.06)	3:50.12	NR
7	1	Sweden	Maria Kardum (57.93); Agneta Eriksson (57.19); Petra Hildér (57.90); Karin Furuhed (58.22)	3:51.24	
8	8	France	Carole Amoric (58.58); Sophie Kamoun (57.24); Véronique Jardin (57.83); Laurence Bensimon (58.50)	3:52.15	NR
