= Swimming at the 1986 World Aquatics Championships – Women's 100 metre freestyle =

Women's 100 metre freestyle at the 1986 FINA World Championships
- Dates: 17 August 1982 (heats); 17 August 1986 (final B); 17 August 1982 (final A)
- Competitors: 47
- Winning time: 55.05 seconds

Medalists
gold medal	Kristin Otto	East Germany
silver medal	Jenna Johnson	United States
bronze medal	Conny van Bentum	Netherlands

The women's 100 metre freestyle event at the 1986 World Aquatics Championships took place 17 August.

== Results ==
=== Heats ===
Rank	Swimmer	Nation	Time	Notes
1	Jenna Johnson	United States	55.58	
2	Kristin Otto	East Germany	55.88	
3	Tamara Costache	Romania	56.25	
4	Conny van Bentum	Netherlands	56.36	
5	Manuela Stellmach	East Germany	56.61	
6	Mary T. Meagher	United States	56.70	
7	Annemarie Verstappen	Netherlands	56.82	
8	Iris Zscherpe	West Germany	56.85	
9	Sophie Kamoun	France	56.93	
10	Karin Seick	West Germany	57.15	
11	Silvia Poll	Costa Rica	57.19	
12	Yelena Dendeberova	Soviet Union	57.50	
13	Romana Frydlova	Czechoslovakia	57.64	
14	Agneta Eriksson	Sweden	57.74	
15	Silvia Persi	Italy	57.96	
16	Marie-Thérèse Armentero	Switzerland	58.00	
17	Virginia Sachero	Argentina	58.18	
18	Edit Ormos	Hungary	58.18	
19	Jane Kerr	Canada	58.26	
20	Sibylle Spati	Switzerland	58.34	
21	Eva Nyberg	Sweden	58.42	
22	Inna Abramova	Soviet Union	58.52	
23	Pamela Rai	Canada	58.72	
24	Evita Paraskevopoulou	Greece	59.06	
25	Maija Airas	Finland	59.09	
26	Pernille Nimb	Denmark	59.12	
27	Tiitta Latosuo	Finland	59.27	
28	Caroline Cooper	United Kingdom	59.45	
29	Fiona Mclay	New Zealand	59.57	
30	Imma Tarrago	Spain	59.71	
31	Nancy Engelen	Belgium	59.74	
32	Ana C Rios	Puerto Rico	59.82	
33	Karen Dieffenthaler	Trinidad and Tobago	59.92	
34	Alicia Cordero	Spain	59.98	
35	Anne Eriksen	Norway	1:00.07	
36	Adriana Pereira	Brazil	1:00.18	
37	Bente Rist	Norway	1:00.44	
38	Ding Jilian	China	1:00.58	
39	Marion Madine	Ireland	1:01.19	
40	Debby Frochtengarten	Brazil	1:01.27	
41	Carolina Mauri	Costa Rica	1:01.45	
42	Nancy Kemp-Arendt	Luxembourg	1:01.66	
43	Chang Hui-chien	Chinese Taipei	1:01.89	
44	Yinghong Chen	China	1:02.16	
45	Rita Garay	Puerto Rico	1:02.99	
46	Lee-Yu Lan	Chinese Taipei	1:03.83	
47	Beatriz Vilalta	Dominican Republic	1:06.21	

=== Finals ===
==== Final B ====
Rank	Name	Nationality	Time	Notes
9	Karin Seick	West Germany	56.98	
10	Silvia Poll	Costa Rica	57.11	
11	Yelena Dendeberova	Soviet Union	57.15	
12	Sophie Kamoun	France	57.28	
13	Marie-Thérèse Armentero	Switzerland	57.37	
14	Silvia Persi	Italy	57.62	
15	Romana Frydlova	Czechoslovakia	58.03	
16	Agneta Eriksson	Sweden	58.57	

==== Final A ====
Rank	Name	Nationality	Time	Notes
1st place, gold medalist(s)	Kristin Otto	East Germany	55.05	
2nd place, silver medalist(s)	Jenna Johnson	United States	55.70	
3rd place, bronze medalist(s)	Conny van Bentum	Netherlands	55.79	
4	Manuela Stellmach	East Germany	55.86	
5	Tamara Costache	Romania	56.03	
6	Mary T. Meagher	United States	56.33	
7	Iris Zscherpe	West Germany	56.95	
8	Annemarie Verstappen	Netherlands	57.01	
