= Swimming at the 1982 World Aquatics Championships – Women's 100 metre freestyle =

Women's 100 metre freestyle at the 1982 FINA World Championships
- Dates: 1 August 1982 (heats); 1 August 1982 (final B); 1 August 1982 (final A)
- Competitors: 34
- Winning time: 55.79 seconds

Medalists
gold medal	Birgit Meineke	East Germany
silver medal	Annemarie Verstappen	Netherlands
bronze medal	Jill Sterkel	United States

The women's 100 metre freestyle event at the 1982 World Aquatics Championships took place 1 August.

== Results ==
=== Heats ===
Rank	Swimmer	Nation	Time	Notes
1	Birgit Meineke	East Germany	55.34	
2	Annemarie Verstappen	Netherlands	56.02	
3	Jill Sterkel	United States	56.89	
4	Irina Gerasimova	Soviet Union	57.00	
5	Kathy Treible	United States	57.02	
6	Caren Metschuck	East Germany	57.19	
7	Karin Seick	West Germany	57.20	
8	Agneta Eriksson	Sweden	57.44	
9	Kaori Yanase	Japan	57.49	
10	Susanne Schuster	West Germany	57.54	
11	June Croft	United Kingdom	57.82	
12	Wilma van Velsen	Netherlands	57.92	
13	Carol Klimpel	Canada	58.10	
14	Nataliya Strunnikova	Soviet Union	58.49	
15	Isabel Reuss	Mexico	58.51	
16	Sylvie Boube	France	58.57	
17	Susie Baumer	Australia	58.58	
18	Virginia Sachero	Argentina	58.70	
19	Naomi Marubashi	Canada	58.78	
20	Miki Saito	Japan	59.18	
21	Pascale Verbauwen	Belgium	59.24	
22	Marie-Thérèse Armentero	Switzerland	59.29	
23	Beda Leirvaag	Norway	59.38	
24	Silvia Persi	Italy	59.50	
25	Claudia Zierold	Switzerland	59.81	
26	Caroline Foot	United Kingdom	59.94	
27	Vilma Aguilera	Puerto Rico	59.98	
28	Sofia Dara	Greece	1:00.02	
29	Carol Ann Heavey	Ireland	1:00.47	
30	Frederique Piegao	France	1:00.96	
31	Anita Hill	Puerto Rico	1:01.36	
32	Shelley Cramer	United States Virgin Islands	1:01.65	
33	Tanya Dangalakova	Bulgaria	1:01.83	
34	Maria Bendito	Venezuela	1:02.30	

=== Finals ===
==== Final B ====
Rank	Name	Nationality	Time	Notes
9	June Croft	United Kingdom	57.06	
10	Kaori Yanase	Japan	57.55	
11	Susanne Schuster	West Germany	57.66	
12	Carol Klimpel	Canada	57.82	
13	Isabel Reuss	Mexico	57.91	
14	Wilma van Velsen	Netherlands	58.07	
15	Sylvie Boube	France	58.38	
16	Nataliya Strunnikova	Soviet Union	58.45	

==== Final A ====
Rank	Name	Nationality	Time	Notes
1st place, gold medalist(s)	Birgit Meineke	East Germany	55.79	
2nd place, silver medalist(s)	Annemarie Verstappen	Netherlands	55.87	
3rd place, bronze medalist(s)	Jill Sterkel	United States	56.27	
4	Irina Gerasimova	Soviet Union	56.61	
5	Kathy Treible	United States	56.69	
6	Caren Metschuck	East Germany	56.71	
7	Karin Seick	West Germany	56.90	
8	Agneta Eriksson	Sweden	56.92	
