= Elles Voskes =

Dutch swimmer (born 1964)

Medal record

Women's swimming

Representing the Netherlands

Olympic Games
Silver medal – second place	1984 Los Angeles	4×100 m freestyle

European Championships
Silver medal – second place	1983 Rome	4×100 m freestyle

Elles Voskes (born 3 August 1964 in Amsterdam, North Holland) is a former freestyle swimmer from The Netherlands, who competed for her native country at the 1984 Summer Olympics in Los Angeles, United States.

There she won the silver medal in the 4×100 m freestyle relay, alongside Conny van Bentum, Desi Reijers, and Annemarie Verstappen, just like a year earlier at the European LC Championships in Rome, Italy.
