= Desi Reijers =

Dutch swimmer (born 1964)

Personal information
- Born: June 4, 1964 (age 62) Doetinchem, Netherlands

Sport
- Sport: Swimming
Medal record
Representing the Netherlands
Olympic Games
Silver medal – second place	Los Angeles	4×100 m freestyle

Dirkje Johanna "Desi" Reijers (born 4 June 1964) is a former freestyle swimmer from the Netherlands, who competed for her native country at the 1984 Summer Olympics in Los Angeles (LA), United States.

There she won the silver medal with a time of 3:44.40 in the 4×100 m freestyle relay, alongside Conny van Bentum, Elles Voskes, and Annemarie Verstappen, just like a year earlier at the European LC Championships in Rome, Italy. In LA, she was disqualified with the 4×100 m medley relay Team.
