= Dozzo =

Dozzo is a surname. Notable people with the surname include:

- Alison Dozzo (born 1968), Canadian swimmer
- Gianpaolo Dozzo (1954–2024), Italian politician
