= Julie Parkes =

Irish swimmer

Personal information
- Born: 17 April 1965 (age 61)

Sport
- Sport: Swimming

Julie Elizabeth Parkes (born 17 April 1965) is an Irish swimmer. She competed in two events at the 1984 Summer Olympics.
