= Rosa María Silva =

Uruguayan swimmer

Personal information
- Born: 21 September 1968 (age 57)

Sport
- Sport: Swimming

Rosa María Silva (born 21 September 1968) is a Uruguayan swimmer. She competed in two events at the 1984 Summer Olympics.
