= Kathrine Bomstad =

Norwegian swimmer

Personal information
- National team: Norway
- Born: 3 February 1963 (age 62) Narvik, Norway

Sport
- Sport: Swimming

Kathrine Bomstad (born 3 February 1963) is a Norwegian swimmer. She was born in Narvik, and married to Ricardo Aldabe. She competed at the 1984 Summer Olympics in Los Angeles, in 200 m butterfly, 200 m medley and 400 m medley.
