= Järfälla Sim =

Club information
- Full name: Järfälla Simsällskap
- Short name: JS
- City: Järfälla
- Founded: September 1971; 53 years ago
- Home pool(s): Järfällabadet

Järfälla Simsällskap, commonly known as Järfälla Sim or JS, is a swimming club based in the municipality of Järfälla north of Stockholm, Sweden, founded in September 1971, and active in swimming, water polo, and synchronized swimming. From the beginning, Jakobsbergs simhall, which was inaugurated in August 1971, was the home pool for Järfälla Sim, and in 2018, the club moved to Järfällabadet.

The water polo team has been among the leading teams of Swedish water polo on the women's side for the last decade. In May 2010 both the men's and women's teams won their Swedish championships. This was the fourth championship for the women's team and the first ever for the men's team.

== Swimmers ==
Swimmers that have participated in the Summer Olympics while representing Järfälla Sim:

- Petra Hildér
- Fredrik Letzler
