= Nancy Hogshead-Makar =

American swimmer (born 1962)

Nancy Hogshead
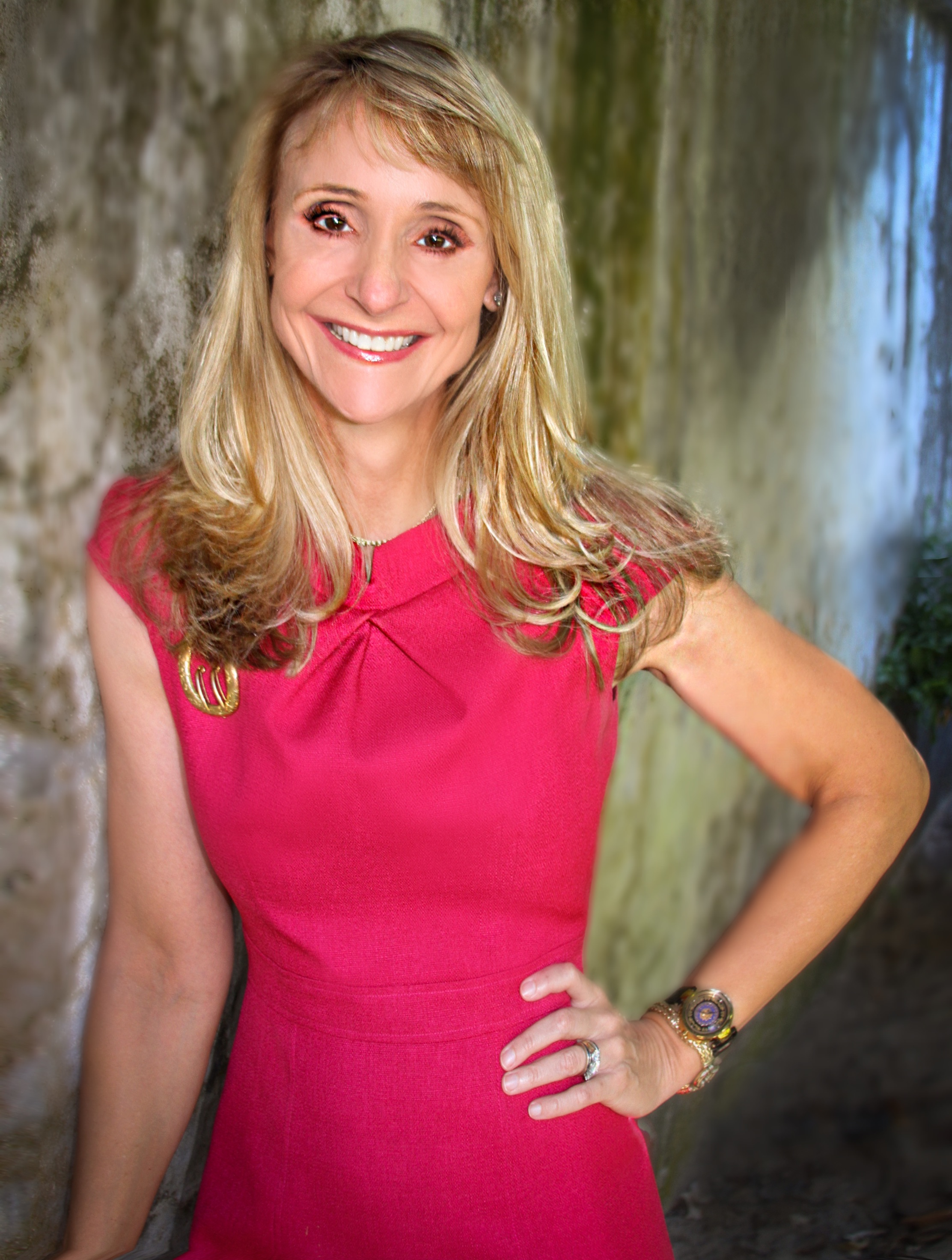
- Hogshead-Makar in 2017

Personal information
- Full name: Nancy Lynn Hogshead-Makar
- National team: United States
- Born: Nancy Lynn Hogshead; April 17, 1962 (age 64) Iowa City, Iowa, U.S.
- Height: 5 ft 10 in (1.78 m)
- Weight: 146 lb (66 kg)

Sport
- Sport: Swimming
- Strokes: Butterfly, freestyle, individual medley
- College team: Duke University
Medal record
Event	1st	2nd	3rd
Olympic Games	3	1	0
World Championships (LC)	0	1	0
Total	3	2	0
Women's swimming
Representing United States
Olympic Games
Gold medal – first place	1984 Los Angeles	100 m freestyle
Gold medal – first place	1984 Los Angeles	4x100 m freestyle
Gold medal – first place	1984 Los Angeles	4x100 m medley
Silver medal – second place	1984 Los Angeles	200 m medley
World Championships (LC)
Silver medal – second place	1978 Berlin	200 m butterfly

Nancy Lynn Hogshead-Makar (née Hogshead, born April 17, 1962) is an American swimmer and civil rights lawyer (focussed on women’s rights). She represented the United States at the 1984 Summer Olympics, where she won three gold medals and one silver medal.

== Swimming ==
Hogshead was born in Iowa City, Iowa. When she was 11 years old, her family moved to Jacksonville, Florida, where she met coach Randy Reese. By age 12 she had qualified for the U.S. Senior Nationals and held the national age-group record in the 200 individual medley. Her first American record was in the 100 yard butterfly in 1977. Hogshead left home to train for the 1980 Summer Olympics in Moscow with the University of Florida swim team, while still in high school. She qualified for the Olympics in the 200 meter butterfly and the 400 meter individual medley, but did not participate due to the multi-national boycott.

Duke University offered Hogshead its first swimming scholarship. There, she was undefeated in dual meets and set a school record in eight different events; one of which stood until 2011. She was a four-time ACC champion and two-time All-American. She was the first woman to be inducted into the Duke Athletics Hall of Fame.

In 1981, Duke University red-shirted Hogshead after she was raped while running between campuses and suffered from post-traumatic stress disorder for several months. In the fall of 1982, her coach persuaded her to return to the pool by offering her a scholarship and a position on the team if she merely showed up at the competitions.

In January 1983, Hogshead left Duke to train full-time for the 1984 Olympics in California. This time she switched from butterfly to freestyle. She won additional national titles on her way to qualifying for the 1984 US swimming team.

=== Olympics ===
At the 1984 Summer Olympics in Los Angeles, she won three gold medals and one silver medal, becoming the most decorated swimmer at the Games. She competed in the first event of the Games, the women's 100m freestyle, where she won in a tie-finish with American teammate Carrie Steinseifer, and they were both awarded gold medals. Hogshead also won golds in the 4 × 100 m freestyle and the 4 × 100 m medley teams, and a silver medal in the 200m individual medley.

== Professional career ==
Hogshead returned to Duke University to finish her undergraduate degree in 1984. During the summer of 1985, Hogshead interned at the Women's Sports Foundation, at the urging of Donna de Varona. She served on the organization's board of trustees from 1987 to 1993 and as its president from 1993 to 1994. She was their Legal Adviser from 2003 to 2010, and was their Senior Director of Advocacy from 2010 to 2014.

After receiving her J.D. degree from Georgetown University Law Center, Hogshead returned to Jacksonville for private practice at Holland & Knight, LLP. She represented student-athletes and universities in Title IX matters.

From 2001 – 2013, Hogshead-Makar was a tenured professor on the faculty at Florida Coastal School of Law (FCSL).

From 2004 – 2012 she was the co-chair of the American Bar Association (ABA) Committee on the Rights of Women.

In 2007, she co-edited the book Equal Play; Title IX and Social Change with economist Andrew Zimbalist. From 2007 – 2010, she served on the Florida Governor's Council on Physical Fitness. The council provided Governor Charlie Crist with a state plan of action to promote physical fitness and nutrition, particularly among children.

From 2009 – 2013 she was a board member on The Forum for the Scholarly Study of Intercollegiate Athletics in Higher Education, and served on the editorial board of the Journal of Intercollegiate Sport.

Since 2011, she has served as a board member on the Aspen Institute, "Sport and Society". She was an advisory board member of the Association of Title IX Administrators from 2011 – 2017.

=== Asthma ===
During the 1984 Olympics, she missed winning a fifth medal by 7/100th of a second, when she suffered a bronchial spasm that led to a diagnosis of asthma. From 1984 to 1996, Hogshead-Makar lectured around the world about asthma management. GlaxoSmithKline sponsored her as she spoke to over 100 groups each year across the US and internationally. Hogshead earned the title of National Spokesperson for the American Lung Association. Hogshead authored the 1990 book, Asthma and Exercise, the first comprehensive book on the topic of asthma and sports.

== Personal life ==
Hogshead married Scott Makar, a fellow lawyer at Holland & Knight, on October 10, 1999. They have a son, Aaron, and twin daughters, Helen Clare and Millicent.

== See also ==
- List of members of the International Swimming Hall of Fame
- List of Duke University people
- List of multiple Olympic gold medalists
- List of Olympic medalists in swimming (women)
- List of World Aquatics Championships medalists in swimming (women)
