= Malin Rundgren =

Swedish swimmer

Personal information
- Nationality: Swedish
- Born: 8 August 1965 (age 60) Lund, Sweden

Sport
- Sport: Swimming

Malin Rundgren (born 8 August 1965) is a Swedish swimmer. She competed in the women's 4 × 100 metre freestyle relay at the 1984 Summer Olympics.
