= Sandra Crousse =

Peruvian swimmer

Personal information
- Born: 7 May 1966 (age 60)

Sport
- Sport: Swimming

Sandra Crousse (born 7 May 1966) is a Peruvian swimmer. She competed in the women's 100 metre freestyle and women's 200 metre freestyle events at the 1984 Summer Olympics.
