= Petra Hildér =

Swedish swimmer

Personal information
- Born: 5 February 1967 (age 59) Stockholm, Sweden

Sport
- Sport: Swimming
- Club: Järfälla Sim

Annette Petra Hildér (born 5 February 1967) is a Swedish former freestyle swimmer. She competed in the women's 4 × 100 metre freestyle relay at the 1984 Summer Olympics.

Hildér represented Järfälla Sim.
