= Cristina Quintarelli =

Italian swimmer (1963–2023)

Personal information
- Born: 24 August 1963 Rome, Italy
- Died: 4 November 2023 (aged 60) Rome, Italy

Sport
- Sport: Swimming

Cristina Quintarelli (24 August 1963 – 4 November 2023) was an Italian swimmer. She competed in the women's 100 metre butterfly at the 1984 Summer Olympics.

She got a bronze in the 100 butterfly at the 1979 Mediterranean Games, and took part in the 1977 and 1981 European Aquatics Championships and in the 1978 World Aquatics Championships. She also was the Italian record holder in the women's 200 metre butterfly.

Quintarelli died in Rome on 4 November 2023, at the age of 60.
