= Aldabe =

Aldabe is a surname. Notable people with the surname include:

- Carlos Aldabe (1919–1998), Argentine footballer and manager
- Ricardo Aldabe (born 1965), Spanish swimmer
