= Sara Guido =

Mexican swimmer

Personal information
- Born: 23 September 1963 (age 62)

Sport
- Sport: Swimming

Sara Guido (born 23 September 1963) is a Mexican swimmer. She competed in three events at the 1984 Summer Olympics.
