= Carole Amoric =

French swimmer (born 1960)

Personal information
- Born: 7 August 1960 (age 65) Saint-Maur-des-Fossés, France

Sport
- Sport: Swimming
- Club: Club des Nageurs de Paris

Carole Amoric-Andraca (born 7 August 1960) is a retired French swimmer. She competed in the women's 4 × 100 metre freestyle relay in the 1984 Summer Olympics.
