= Swimming at the 1985 Summer Universiade =

Swimming at the XIII Summer Universiade
- Dates: 25 August 1985 – 30 August 1985

The swimming competition at the 1985 Summer Universiade took place in Kobe, Japan from August 25 to August 30, 1985.

== Men's events ==
Event	Gold		Silver		Bronze	
100 m freestyle	Matt Biondi; United States	49.14	Stéphan Caron; France	49.97	Scott McCadam; United States	50.63
200 m freestyle	Matt Biondi; United States	1:49.52	Stéphan Caron; France	1:49.78	Marcel Gery; Czechoslovakia	1:50.98
400 m freestyle	Justin Lemberg; Australia	3:52.45	John Mykkanen; United States	3:53.24	Thomas Fahrner; West Germany	3:54.17
1500 m freestyle	Alex Miawsky; United States	15:20.13	Mike O'Brien; United States	15:20.45	John Day; Great Britain	15:31.93
100 m backstroke	Igor Polyansky; Soviet Union	56.26	Mark Rhodenbaugh; United States	56.99	Sergei Zabolotnov; Soviet Union	57.04
200 m backstroke	Igor Polyansky; Soviet Union	1:59.76	Sean Murphy; Canada	2:02.69	Mike West; Canada	2:03.14
100 m breaststroke	John Moffet; United States	1:02.88	Gianni Minervini; Italy	1:03.38	Eduard Klimentiev; Soviet Union	1:03.94
200 m breaststroke	John Moffet; United States	2:18.83	Alexandre Yokochi; Portugal	2:18.92	Dimitri Kuzmin; Soviet Union	2:19.81
100 m butterfly	Jon Sieben; Australia	53.97	Matt Biondi; United States	54.03	Michael Gross; West Germany	54.16
200 m butterfly	Michael Gross; West Germany	1:57.88	Anthony Mosse; New Zealand	1:58.94	Chris Rives; United States	2:00.03
200 m individual medley	Chris Rives; United States	2:03.50	Duffy Dillon; United States	2:04.65	Ricardo Prado; Brazil	2:04.92
400 m individual medley	Ricardo Prado; Brazil	4:19.83	Rob Woodhouse; Australia	4:20.76	Jeff Prior; United States	4:23.91
4×100 m freestyle relay	United States (USA); Scott McCadam; Jim Born; Craig Oppel; Matt Biondi	3:20.12	West Germany (FRG)	3:22.70	Soviet Union (URS)	3:23.76
4×200 m freestyle relay	United States (USA); Craig Oppel; Charley Siroky; Duffy Dillon; Matt Biondi	7:20.34	West Germany (FRG)	7:22.43	Canada (CAN)	7:30.81
4×100 m medley relay	United States (USA); Mark Rhodenbaugh; John Moffet; Chris O'Neil; Scott McCadam	3:42.99	Soviet Union (URS)	3:46.33	West Germany (FRG)	3:47.71

Legend: CR – Championship record; NR – National record

== Women's events ==
Event	Gold		Silver		Bronze	
100 m freestyle	Conny van Bentum; Netherlands	55.87	Jenna Johnson; United States	56.29	Kathy Coffin; United States	57.71
200 m freestyle	Conny van Bentum; Netherlands	2:00.34	Mary T. Meagher; United States	2:01.64	Michelle Pearson; Australia	2:02.25
400 m freestyle	Patty Sabo; United States	4:16.23	Andrea Orosz; Hungary	4:16.88	Stacy Shupe; United States	4:18.34
800 m freestyle	Stacy Shupe; United States	8:45.87	Carla Lasi; Italy	8:47.76	Andrea Orosz; Hungary	8:49.41
100 m backstroke	Carmen Bunaciu; Romania	1:03.67	Jolanda de Rover; Netherlands	1:03.75	Michelle Donahue; United States	1:03.83
200 m backstroke	Jolanda de Rover; Netherlands	2:13.34	Michelle Donahue; United States	2:13.81	Carmen Bunaciu; Romania	2:17.63
100 m breaststroke	Tania Bogomilova; Bulgaria	1:09.27	Larisa Moreva; Soviet Union	1:12.24	Manuela Dalla Valle; Italy	1:12.33
200 m breaststroke	Tania Bogomilova; Bulgaria	2:30.30	Larisa Moreva; Soviet Union	2:32.53	Channon Hermstad; United States	2:36.72
100 m butterfly	Mary T. Meagher; United States	59.81	Melanie Buddemeyer; United States	1:01.33	Conny van Bentum; Netherlands	1:01.51
200 m butterfly	Mary T. Meagher; United States	2:07.32	Kiyomi Takahashi; Japan	2:13.87	Patty King; United States	2:15.06
200 m individual medley	Svetlana Koptchikova; Soviet Union	2:18.11	Michelle Pearson; Australia	2:18.21	Tania Bogomilova; Bulgaria	2:19.36
400 m individual medley	Channon Hermstad; United States	4:49.84	Michelle Pearson; Australia	4:51.20	Aivi Liiv; Soviet Union	4:52.04
4×100 m freestyle relay	United States (USA); Jennifer Boyd; Paige Zemina; Kirsten Wengler; Jenna Johnson	3:49.10	Soviet Union (URS)	3:51.17	Netherlands (NED)	3:51.42
4×200 m freestyle relay	United States (USA); Paige Zemina; Stacy Shupe; Francie O'Leary; Mary T. Meagher	8:15.14	Australia (AUS); Michelle Pearson; Jenny Messenger; Rebecca Whitehead; Michelle Ford	8:21.78	Netherlands (NED)	8:22.74
4×100 m medley relay	United States (USA); Michelle Donahue; Kathy Smith; Mary T. Meagher; Jenna Johnson	4:11.24	Bulgaria (BUL)	4:14.59	Australia (AUS); Michelle Pearson; Jenny Messenger; Rebecca Whitehead; Julie West	4:16.78

Legend: CR – Championship record; NR – National record

== Medal table ==
* Host nation (Japan)

Rank	Nation	Gold	Silver	Bronze	Total
1	United States (USA)	18	9	8	35
2	Netherlands (NED)	3	1	3	7
3	Soviet Union (URS)	2	4	5	11
4	Australia (AUS)	2	4	2	8
5	Bulgaria (BUL)	2	1	1	4
6	West Germany (FRG)	1	2	3	6
7	Brazil (BRA)	1	0	1	2
7	Romania (ROU)	1	0	1	2
9	Italy (ITA)	0	2	1	3
10	France (FRA)	0	2	0	2
11	Canada (CAN)	0	1	2	3
12	Hungary (HUN)	0	1	1	2
13	Japan (JPN)*	0	1	0	1
13	New Zealand (NZL)	0	1	0	1
13	Portugal (POR)	0	1	0	1
16	Czechoslovakia (TCH)	0	0	1	1
16	Great Britain (GBR)	0	0	1	1
Totals (17 entries)		30	30	30	90
