= Carrie Steinseifer =

American swimmer

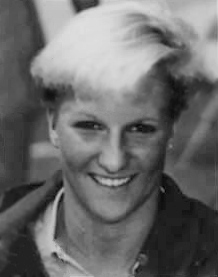
- Steinseifer in 1984

Personal information
- Full name: Carrie Lynne Steinseifer
- Nickname: "Carrie"
- National team: United States
- Born: February 12, 1968 (age 58) Redwood City, California, U.S.
- Height: 5 ft 6 in (1.68 m)
- Weight: 126 lb (57 kg)

Sport
- Sport: Swimming
- Strokes: Freestyle
- Club: West Valley Aquatics
- College team: University of Texas
Medal record
Event	1st	2nd	3rd
Olympic Games	3	0	0
Pan Pacific Championships	4	1	0
Pan American Games	4	0	0
Total	11	1	0
Women's Swimming
Representing United States
Olympic Games
Gold medal – first place	1984 Los Angeles	100 m freestyle
Gold medal – first place	1984 Los Angeles	4×100 m freestyle
Gold medal – first place	1984 Los Angeles	4 x 100 m Medley
Pan Pacific Championships
Gold medal – first place	1985 Tokyo	200 m freestyle
Gold medal – first place	1985 Tokyo	4x100 m freestyle
Gold medal – first place	1985 Tokyo	4x200 m freestyle
Gold medal – first place	1989 Tokyo	4×100 m freestyle
Silver medal – second place	1985 Tokyo	100 m freestyle
Pan American Games
Gold medal – first place	1983 Caracas	100 m freestyle
Gold medal – first place	1983 Caracas	4×100 m freestyle
Gold medal – first place	1983 Caracas	4×100 m medley
Gold medal – first place	1987 Indianapolis	4×100 m freestyle

Carrie Lynne Steinseifer (born February 12, 1968), later known by her married name Carrie Bates, is an American former competition swimmer and Olympic champion. She won gold medals in the women's 100-meter freestyle, 4×100-meter freestyle relay and 4x100-meter medley relay at the 1984 Summer Olympics in Los Angeles.

As a 15-year-old at the 1983 Pan American Games in Caracas, Venezuela, she won gold medals in the 4×100-meter freestyle and 4×100-meter medley relays. As a 17-year-old, she won gold medals in the 200-meter freestyle, 4×100-meter freestyle relay and the 4×200-meter relay, and a silver in the 100-meter freestyle at the 1985 Pan Pacific Swimming Championships in Tokyo, Japan.

Steinseifer attended the University of Texas, where she swam for coach Richard Quick's Texas Longhorns swimming and diving team in National Collegiate Athletic Association (NCAA) competition. During her college career, she was a member of three of the Lady Longhorns' NCAA national championship relay teams—once in the 800-yard relay (1987) and twice in the 200-yard relay (1987, 1988). She was also a key points contributor to the Longhorns' NCAA national team championships in 1987 and 1988.

While attending Texas, she continued to represent the United States in international competition. She won a gold medal in the 4×100-meter freestyle relay at 1987 Pan American Games in Indianapolis, Indiana, and another gold as a member of the winning U.S. team in the 4×100-meter freestyle relay at the 1989 Pan Pacific Swimming Championships in Tokyo.

Steinseifer was inducted into the International Swimming Hall of Fame as an "Honor Swimmer" in 1999.

She lives outside Portland, Oregon, with her two daughters, Gabby and Miya, and her husband, Ken Blanco.

== See also ==
- List of members of the International Swimming Hall of Fame
- List of Olympic medalists in swimming (women)
- List of University of Texas at Austin alumni
