= Brigitte Wanderer =

Austrian swimmer

Personal information
- Born: 12 November 1966 (age 59)

Sport
- Sport: Swimming

Brigitte Wanderer (born 12 November 1966) is an Austrian butterfly and medley swimmer. She competed in three events at the 1984 Summer Olympics.
