= Kim Jin-suk (swimmer) =

South Korean swimmer (born 1969)

Personal information
- Born: 28 January 1969 (age 57)

Sport
- Sport: Swimming

Korean name
- Hangul: 김진숙
- Hanja: 金眞淑
- RR: Gim Jinsuk
- MR: Kim Chinsuk
- IPA: [kim.d͡ʑinsʰuk̚]

Kim Jin-suk (born 28 January 1969) is a South Korean freestyle swimmer. She competed in two events at the 1984 Summer Olympics. She attended Ewha Womans University.
