= Anna Doig =

New Zealand swimmer

Personal information
- Born: 18 December 1965 (age 60) Wellington, New Zealand

Sport
- Sport: Swimming

Anna Maree Doig (born 18 December 1965) is a former freestyle and butterfly swimmer from New Zealand, who represented her native country at 1984 Summer Olympics in Los Angeles, California. She is now a seventh grade teacher at a middle school.
