= Karin Brandes =

Peruvian swimmer

Personal information
- Born: 26 September 1967 (age 58)

Sport
- Sport: Swimming

Karin Brandes (born 26 September 1967) is a Peruvian former butterfly and medley swimmer. She competed in three events at the 1984 Summer Olympics.
