= Mary T. Meagher =

American Olympic swimmer (born 1964)

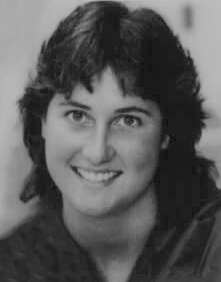
- Meagher in 1984

Personal information
- Full name: Mary Terstegge Meagher
- Nicknames: "Mary T.", "Madam Butterfly"
- National team: United States
- Born: October 27, 1964 (age 61) Louisville, Kentucky, U.S.
- Height: 5 ft 8 in (1.73 m)
- Weight: 141 lb (64 kg)
- Spouse: Michael Plant
- Children: 2

Sport
- Sport: Swimming
- Event: 100, 200-meter butterfly
- Strokes: Butterfly, freestyle
- Club: Lakeside Swim Club (LSC); Old Dominion Aquatic (1988)
- College team: University of California, Berkeley
- Coach: Dennis Pursley, Bill Peak (LSC); Karen Moe Humphreys (Berkeley)
Medal record
Women's swimming
Representing the United States
Olympic Games
Gold medal – first place	1984 Los Angeles	100 m butterfly
Gold medal – first place	1984 Los Angeles	200 m butterfly
Gold medal – first place	1984 Los Angeles	4x100 m medley
Silver medal – second place	1988 Seoul	4x100 m medley
Bronze medal – third place	1988 Seoul	200 m butterfly
World Championships (LC)
Gold medal – first place	1982 Guayaquil	100 m butterfly
Gold medal – first place	1986 Madrid	200 m butterfly
Silver medal – second place	1982 Guayaquil	200 m butterfly
Silver medal – second place	1982 Guayaquil	4x100 m medley
Silver medal – second place	1986 Madrid	4x100 m freestyle
Silver medal – second place	1986 Madrid	4x200 m freestyle
Silver medal – second place	1986 Madrid	4x100 m medley
Bronze medal – third place	1986 Madrid	100 m butterfly
Bronze medal – third place	1986 Madrid	200 m freestyle
Pan American Games
Gold medal – first place	1979 San Juan	100 m butterfly
Gold medal – first place	1983 Caracas	200 m butterfly
Summer Universiade
Gold medal – first place	1985 Kobe	100 m butterfly
Gold medal – first place	1985 Kobe	200 m butterfly
Gold medal – first place	1985 Kobe	4x200 m freestyle
Gold medal – first place	1985 Kobe	4x100 m medley
Silver medal – second place	1985 Kobe	200 m freestyle
Pan Pacific Championships
Gold medal – first place	1985 Tokyo	100 m butterfly
Gold medal – first place	1985 Tokyo	200 m butterfly

Mary Terstegge Meagher Plant (born October 27, 1964) is an American former competition swimmer, who swam for U.California Berkeley, a three-time 1984 Olympic champion, and a world record-holder. In 1981 she bettered her own existing world records in the 100-meter butterfly (57.93) and 200-meter butterfly (2:05.96). These times would stand as the world records for 18 and 19 years, respectively, and are considered by many swimming historians to be among the all-time greatest sports performances by a competitive swimmer.

== Early life ==
Meagher was born the 10th of 11 siblings on October 27, 1964, in Louisville, Kentucky, to father James L. Meagher Jr., a two-time Notre Dame basketball letterman and mother Floy Terstegge Meagher. Highly active in the Louisville community, her father James was the Chairman of S & T Industries, a company that sells and manufactures highly precise measuring tools, and had served on alumni boards for Louisville's Bellarmine University and Notre Dame. Mary graduated from Louisville's Sacred Heart Academy in 1982. Her sister, former U.S. Representative Anne Northup, also graduated Sacred Heart.

=== Early swimming ===
Mary first began swimming during the summers at Louisville's River Road Country Club, where her father, a golf enthusiast, had been a founding member. By the age of eight, Meagher trained and competed first for Louisville's Plantation Country Club, and by fourteen for Louisville's Lakeside Swim Club where through the age of 16, she was managed and coached primarily by Lakeside's future Hall of Fame Coach Dennis Pursley, and as a High School upperclassman by Coach Bill Peak, who had also coached at Plantation. Peak trained Meagher for a total of five years at Lakeside, where he was assisted by Coaches Scott Miller and Mike Powell, and would later coach her for seven months prior to the 1988 Olympics. At the 1979 Pan American Games in San Juan, Puerto Rico, she set her first world record—at the age of 14—in the 200-meter butterfly.

In February 1982, swimming as a Senior for Sacred Heart Academy at the Kentucky State Swimming Championships, Meagher easily won the 100-yard butterfly in a time of 56.11, and won the 500-yard freestyle, placing ahead of the second place competitor by a full eight seconds. Dominant as a regional team, Meagher helped lead Sacred Heart to the women's state title that year, by a large margin.

"When she was a teenager, Mary showed no weaknesses," reflected her early Lakeside Coach Dennis Pursley. "Every athlete I've ever known had some form of weakness, be it in terms of motivation, technique or physical attributes, but Mary was the exception." Meagher was known for her buoyant butterfly position, riding high in the water, and for her very strong whip or dolphin kick.

== 1980 Olympics ==
Prior to the 1980 trials, Meagher, as a high school sophomore, moved to Cincinnati to train with her former Lakeside Coach Dennis Pursley at the Cincinnati Marlins.

Qualifying at the U.S. Olympic trials, Meagher was expected to compete for medals at the 1980 Summer Olympics in Moscow, but lost the opportunity due to the American-led boycott of the Moscow Olympics.

After the 1980 Olympic trials, Meagher switched to one intense swim practice a day and played High School field hockey for Sacred Heart, but was soon back to two a day practices.

=== 1981 records ===
In 1981 Meagher gave one of the most memorable performances of her career, or perhaps of any swimmer of the era, at the U.S. Swimming long course National Championships in Brown Deer, Wisconsin. At Nationals that year, she set world records in both the 200-meter of 2:05.96 and 100-meter butterfly of 57.93, both of the stroke's individual events. The times for both records were immediately noticed by the world swimming community, particularly her record for the 100 meters. As a testimony to their impact and uniqueness in the swimming world community, both times would remain as the world records for nearly two decades: American swimmer Jenny Thompson lowered the 100-meter record in 1999, while Susie O'Neill of Australia set the record in the 200-meter a year later. A few sports historians have contended that Meagher's butterfly records were among the most impressive records ever set in any sport, ranking among such noteworthy records as Bob Beamon's long jump world record in 1968. For her two record swims Meagher was named Female World Swimmer of the Year by Swimming World Magazine, which she won again in 1985.

=== U. California Berkeley ===
Meagher attended the University of California, Berkeley, where she studied Child Development and swam for the California Golden Bears swimming and diving team in National Collegiate Athletic Association (NCAA) and Pacific-10 Conference competition. At Berkeley, where she received an athletic scholarship, she was trained and mentored by ASCAA Hall of Fame Coach Karen Moe Humphreys Thornton, who competed for UCLA and had set a world record in the 200-meter butterfly at the 1972 Munich Olympics. As it was her signature event, Coach Thornton's former mastery of the 200-meter butterfly may have been a factor in attracting Meagher to Berkeley. Recognized for her collegiate accomplishments at Berkeley, Meagher received the Honda Sports Award for Swimming and Diving twice, recognizing her as the outstanding college female swimmer of the year in 1984–85 and again in 1986–87. In 1987, she received the Honda Broderick Cup as the nation's top female collegiate athlete. She graduated from the University of California in 1987 with a Bachelor of Arts degree in social sciences.

== Olympics ==
=== 1984 Los Angeles Olympics ===
At the 1984 Summer Olympics in Los Angeles, Meagher won gold medals in both the Women's 100 m butterfly event with a time of 59.26 and the Women's 200 m butterfly with a time of 2:06.90. She won a third gold by completing the butterfly leg of the women's 4 × 100 m medley relay that recorded a combined time of 4:08.34 as the winning U.S. team in the event final. Meagher's American 4x100 medley relay team won by a sizable 3.63 second margin over the team from West Germany. At the Olympics that year, Meagher's prior teammate at Louisville's Lakeside Swim Club, Tori Trees, placed fifth in the finals of the 200-meter backstroke.

=== 1988 Seoul Olympics ===
Meagher trained for the 1988 Olympics for around seven months with her prior coach Bill Peak at the Old Dominion Swim Club in Virginia Beach, Virginia, and credited Peak with helping her qualify for the Olympic team. After becoming only the third American woman to qualify for three Olympics, she competed at the 1988 Summer Olympics in Seoul, South Korea, and won a bronze medal in the 200-meter butterfly with a time of 2:10.80. German swimmers Kathleen Norde took the gold and Birte Weigang won the silver.

Meagher won a silver medal swimming the butterfly leg of the 4 × 100 m medley. By the time she left competitive swimming, Meagher had won 24 U.S. national swimming titles. Meagher retired from swimming after the 1988 Olympics.

== Personal life ==
She married former speed skater Mike Plant. They have lived in Peachtree City, Georgia, with their two children, Maddie and Drew. Mike Plant's brother and Meagher's brother-in-law, Tom Plant, was also a speed skater and Olympian. Meagher's older sister Anne Meagher Northup served as a US Congresswoman.

== Honors ==
Mary had the rare distinction of being inducted into the International Swimming Hall of Fame. In Louisville, the Mary T. Meagher Aquatic Center, a modern multi-lane Olympic pool in the Crescent Hill neighborhood of Louisville, is named in her honor. Meagher trained in a pool facility in Crescent Hill during her time with Lakeside's Coach Bill Peak prior to the 1984 Olympics. A street is named in Meagher's honor in Elizabethtown, Kentucky.

== See also ==
- List of multiple Olympic gold medalists at a single Games
- List of Olympic medalists in swimming (women)
- List of University of California, Berkeley alumni
- List of World Aquatics Championships medalists in swimming (women)
- World record progression 100 metres butterfly
- World record progression 200 metres butterfly

Records
Preceded by Andrea Pollack	Women's 100-meter butterfly world record-holder April 11, 1980 – August 23, 1999	Succeeded by Jenny Thompson
Preceded by Andrea Pollack	Women's 200-meter butterfly world record-holder July 7, 1979 – May 17, 2000	Succeeded by Susie O'Neill
Awards
Preceded by Petra Schneider	Swimming World; World Swimmer of the Year; 1981	Succeeded by Petra Schneider
Preceded by Kristin Otto	Swimming World; World Swimmer of the Year; 1985	Succeeded by Kristin Otto
Preceded by Tracy Caulkins	Swimming World; American Swimmer of the Year; 1985	Succeeded by Betsy Mitchell
