= Grazia Colombo =

Italian swimmer

Personal information
- Born: 31 August 1964 (age 61) Milan, Italy

Sport
- Sport: Swimming
Medal record
Representing Italy
Mediterranean Games
Gold medal – first place	1983 Casablanca	4x100m medley relay

Grazia Colombo (born 31 August 1964) is an Italian swimmer. She competed in two events at the 1984 Summer Olympics.
