= Maarit Sihvonen =

Finnish swimmer

Personal information
- Born: 16 February 1961 (age 65) Oulujoki, Finland

Sport
- Sport: Swimming

Maarit Sihvonen (born 16 February 1961) is a Finnish breaststroke, freestyle and medley swimmer. She competed in three events at the 1984 Summer Olympics.
