= María Urbina =

Mexican swimmer

Personal information
- Born: 9 May 1968 (age 58)

Sport
- Sport: Swimming

María Urbina (born 9 May 1968) is a Mexican butterfly swimmer. She competed in two events, the 100m Butterfly and the 4 × 100 m medley relay at the 1984 Summer Olympics. She placed 28th in her individual event and was disqualified in her relay.
