= Sophie Kamoun =

French swimmer (born 1967)

Personal information
- Full name: Sophie Marie Reine Kamoun
- National team: France
- Born: 8 June 1967 (age 59)

Sport
- Sport: Swimming
- College team: UC Santa Barbara Gauchos
- Coach: Gregg Wilson
Medal record
Representing France
Mediterranean Games
Gold medal – first place	1983 Casablanca	100m freestyle
Gold medal – first place	1983 Casablanca	4x100m freestyle relay
Gold medal – first place	1991 Athens	50m freestyle
Silver medal – second place	1983 Casablanca	200m freestyle
Silver medal – second place	1991 Athens	100m freestyle

Sophie Marie Reine Kamoun (born 8 June 1967) is a French former swimmer who competed in the 1984 Summer Olympics.

== Early life and Olympics ==
Kamoun, the daughter of French Olympic swimmer Marc Kamoun, was born on 8 June 1967. She joined the swimming club CS Clichy 92 and saw success in 1983 where she won the French 50 m freestyle and a French relay title. She later competed at the 1983 Mediterranean Games in Casablanca and won the 100 m freestyle and the 4 × 100 m freestyle relay.

Kamoun represented France at the 1984 Summer Olympics. She qualified for the B Final in the 100 m freestyle and finished 13th overall. She also was on France's 4 × 100 m freestyle relay team and finished 8th.

== Post-Olympic life ==
Kamoun enrolled at the University of California, Santa Barbara and was a student-athlete on the UC Santa Barbara Gauchos women's swim team. She competed with the Gauchos from 1987 to 1989 and was named a two-time All-American as part of the Gauchos 200 and 800 freestyle relay teams.

In 1993, Kamoun retired from individual swims and was credited with 26 French swimming titles throughout her career. The following year, Francis Luyce, the president of the French Swimming Federation, brought Kamoun on to handle communications. She later became a communications director at Nike, Inc. in France.

Kamoun was awarded the Knight rank of the Ordre national du Mérite in October 2013. She has stayed involved with swimming, leading a press agency and working with Charlotte Bonnet, Fantine Lesaffre, Mehdy Metella, and Maxime Grousset. She has worked to teach children how to swim.

== Personal life ==
Kamoun met Stephen Roche, the 1987 Tour de France winner, at the 2001 Tour de France and they later began a relationship. The couple moved to Paris in summer of 2002 and live with Kamoun's son from a previous relationship.
