= Chow Lai Yee =

Hong Kong swimmer (born 1967)

Personal information
- Born: 23 June 1967 (age 59)

Sport
- Sport: Swimming

Chow Lai Yee (born 23 June 1967) is a Hong Kong breaststroke and freestyle swimmer. She competed in four events at the 1984 Summer Olympics.
