= Alison Dozzo =

Canadian swimmer

Personal information
- Born: 7 March 1968 (age 58) Toronto, Ontario, Canada

Sport
- Sport: Swimming

Alison Dozzo (born 7 March 1968) is a Canadian former swimmer. She competed in the women's 200 metre individual medley at the 1984 Summer Olympics.
