= Carole Brook =

Swiss swimmer

Personal information
- Born: 3 July 1965 (age 61) Winterthur, Switzerland

Sport
- Sport: Swimming

Carole Brook (born 3 July 1965) is a Swiss former butterfly swimmer. She competed at the 1980 Summer Olympics and the 1984 Summer Olympics.
