= Carol-Ann Heavey =

Irish swimmer

Personal information
- Full name: Carol-Ann Heavey

Sport
- Sport: Swimming

Carol-Ann Heavey is an Irish swimmer. She competed in three events at the 1984 Summer Olympics.
