= Yan Hong (swimmer) =

Chinese swimmer (born 1967)

Personal information
- Born: October 6, 1967 (age 58)

Sport
- Sport: Swimming

Yan Hong (simplified Chinese: 严红; traditional Chinese: 嚴紅, born 6 October 1967) is a Chinese former swimmer who competed in the 1984 Summer Olympics.
