= Jolanda de Rover =

Dutch swimmer (born 1963)

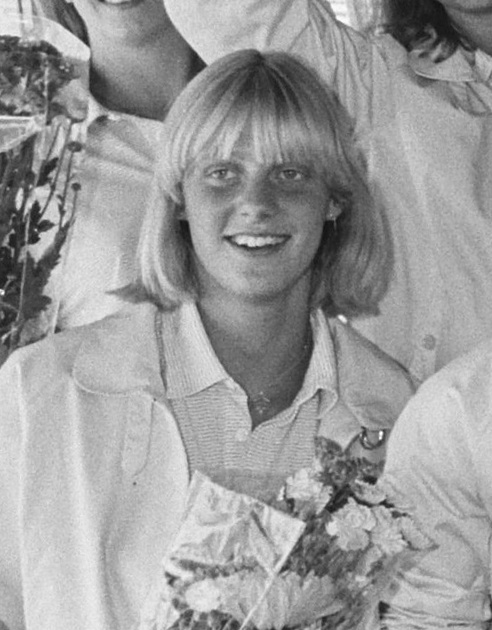
- Jolanda de Rover in 1981

Personal information
- Full name: Jolanda de Rover
- Nationality: Dutch
- Born: 10 October 1963 (age 62) Amstelveen, the Netherlands
- Height: 1.85 m (6 ft 1 in)
- Weight: 70 kg (154 lb)

Sport
- Sport: Swimming
- Strokes: Backstroke
- Club: DJK, Amsterdam
Medal record
Representing the Netherlands
Olympic Games
Gold medal – first place	1984 Los Angeles	200 m backstroke
Bronze medal – third place	1984 Los Angeles	100 m backstroke
World Championships
Bronze medal – third place	1986 Madrid	4×100 m medley
European Championships
Silver medal – second place	1981 Split	200 m backstroke
Silver medal – second place	1983 Rome	4×100 m medley
Bronze medal – third place	1985 Sofia	200 m backstroke
Summer Universiade
Gold medal – first place	1985 Kobe	200 m backstroke
Silver medal – second place	1985 Kobe	100 m backstroke
Silver medal – second place	1987 Zagreb	200 m backstroke
Bronze medal – third place	1987 Zagreb	100 m backstroke

Jolanda de Rover (born 10 October 1963) is a female former backstroke swimmer from the Netherlands.

== Swimming career ==
Jolanda de Rover competed at the 1980, 1984 and 1988 Summer Olympics and won a gold and a bronze medal in backstroke in 1984. In 1988, she finished fifth and seventh in the 4 × 100 m medley relay and 200 m backstroke events, respectively. Between 1981 and 1986 she won four medals at European and world championships; she also won at least three national titles and set at least 10 national records in backstroke events. Despite being of Dutch nationality she won the ASA National British Championships 200 metres backstroke title twice in 1981 and 1988.

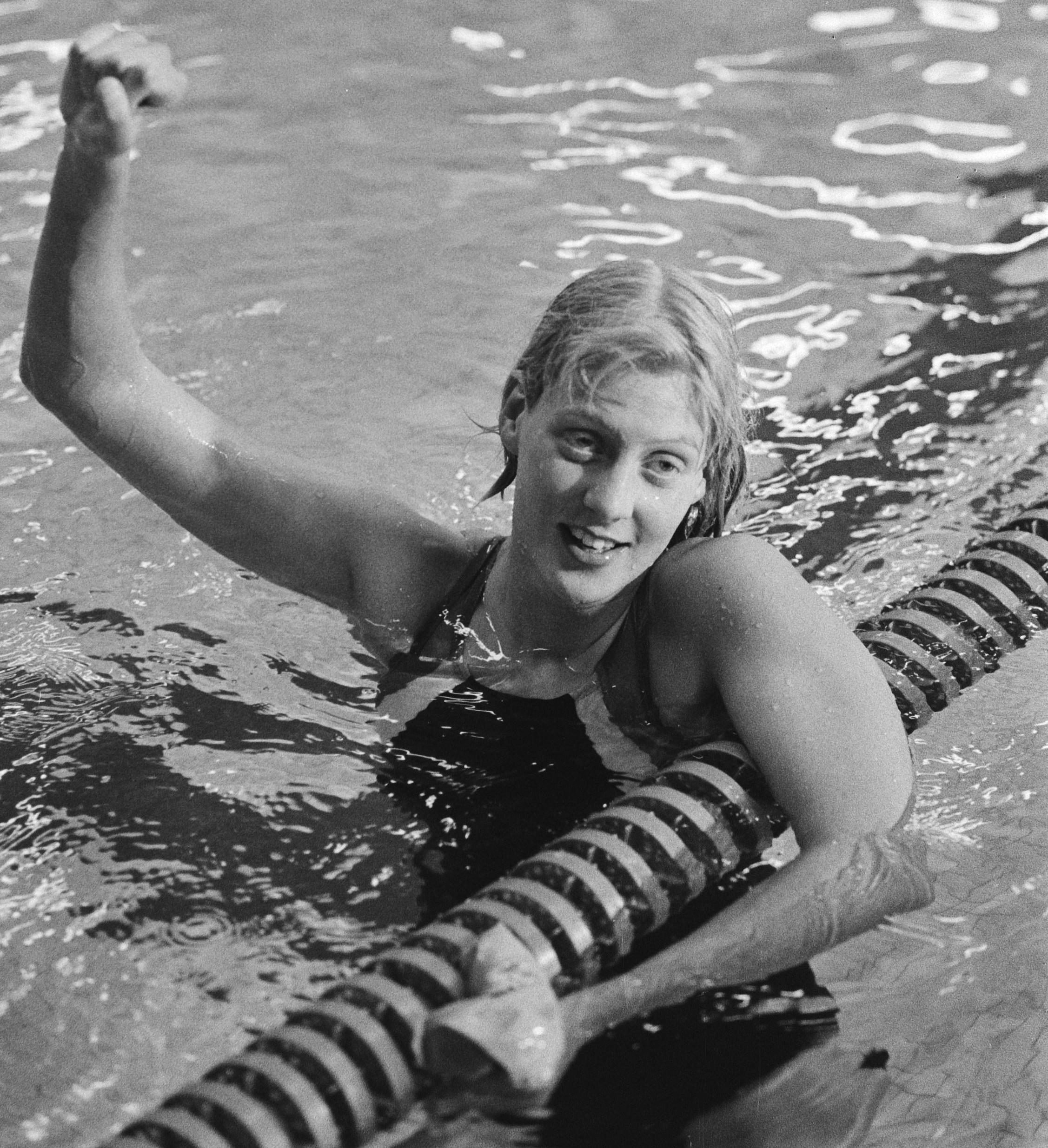
Jolanda de Rover in 1981

== Personal life ==
De Rover was born in Amstelveen. She is the mother of Kira Toussaint, who qualified for the 2016 Summer Olympics in Rio de Janeiro in the 100 meter backstroke.
