= Michelle Pearson =

Australian swimmer (born 1962)

Personal information
- Full name: Michelle Robyn Pearson
- National team: Australia
- Born: 22 April 1962 (age 64)
- Height: 1.83 m (6 ft 0 in)
- Weight: 71 kg (157 lb)

Sport
- Sport: Swimming
- Strokes: Freestyle, medley
Medal record
Women's swimming
Representing Australia
Olympic Games
Bronze medal – third place	1984 Los Angeles	200 m medley
Commonwealth Games
Gold medal – first place	1986 Edinburgh	4 x 200 m freestyle
Pan Pacific Championships
Gold medal – first place	1985 Tokyo	200 m medley
Summer Universiade
Silver medal – second place	1985 Kobe	200 m medley
Silver medal – second place	1985 Kobe	400 m medley
Bronze medal – third place	1985 Kobe	200 m freestyle

Michelle Robyn Pearson (born 22 April 1962) is an Australian former medley and freestyle swimmer of the 1980s, who won a bronze medal in the 200-metre individual medley at the 1984 Summer Olympics in Los Angeles. Her versatility saw her qualify for four finals.

Pearson made her international debut at the 1978 Commonwealth Games in Edmonton, Canada, where she finalled in both the 200-metre and 400-metre individual medleys, finishing seventh and fifth respectively. She made her Olympic debut at the 1980 Summer Olympics in Moscow, where she was eliminated in the heats of the 100-metre freestyle. She was a part of the 4×100-metre freestyle relay team along with Lisa Curry, Rosemary Brown and Karen van de Graaf, which placed fifth in the final.

In 1981, Pearson became one of the first athletes in Australia to attend the newly established Australian Institute of Sport (AIS). Pearson attend the AIS until 1986 and was named AIS Athlete of the Year in 1985.

At the 1982 Commonwealth Games in Brisbane, Pearson collected her first international medals, winning silver and bronze in the 400-metre and 200-metre individual medley respectively. Curry won both events.

Pearson had a good preparation for the 1984 Summer Olympics, after winning two events at the United States Championships as a guest competitor. In the 200-metre individual medley, she trailed home the American duo of Tracy Caulkins and Nancy Hogshead, edging out Curry by 0.83 of a second to claim the bronze medal. Pearson narrowly missed a second silver in the 200-metre freestyle, finishing in a time of 1m 59.79 seconds, just 0.1 of a second slower than the bronze medallist Annemarie Verstappen of the Netherlands. She also finished fifth in the 100-metre freestyle, which was won by Hogshead. She combined with Curry, Angela Russell and Anna McVann to finish fourth in the 4×100-metre freestyle relay.

Pearson also won five medals for Australia at the 1985 Summer Universiade in Kobe, Japan. Pearson won silvers in the 200m individual medley, 400m individual medley and as a part of the 4 × 200 m Freestyle relay. Pearson also won bronze in the 200m Freestyle and as a part of Australia's 4 × 100 m Freestyle relay team.

Pearson's form began to dip after the Olympics. Her only medal at the 1986 Commonwealth Games in Edinburgh was a gold in the 4×200-metre freestyle relay.

== See also ==
- List of Olympic medalists in swimming (women)
