= Daniela Galassi =

Sammarinese swimmer

Personal information
- Born: 25 June 1968 (age 58)

Sport
- Sport: Swimming

Daniela Galassi (born 25 June 1968) is a Sammarinese swimmer. She competed in three events at the 1984 Summer Olympics.
