= Lotta Flink =

Hong Kong swimmer (born 1965)

Personal information
- Born: 18 January 1965 (age 61)

Sport
- Sport: Swimming

Charlotta Ingrid “Lotta” Flink-Saigeon (born 18 January 1965) is a Hong Kong backstroke, freestyle and medley swimmer. She competed in five events at the 1984 Summer Olympics.
