= Li Jinlan =

Chinese swimmer

Personal information
- Born: February 14, 1967 (age 59)

Sport
- Sport: Swimming
- Strokes: Butterfly

Li Jinlan (born 14 February 1967) is a Chinese former swimmer who competed in the 1984 Summer Olympics.
