= Michelle MacPherson =

Canadian swimmer

Personal information
- Full name: Michelle A. MacPherson
- National team: Canada
- Born: May 11, 1966 (age 60) Toronto, Ontario, Canada
- Height: 1.63 m (5 ft 4 in)
- Weight: 50 kg (110 lb)

Sport
- Sport: Swimming
- Strokes: Backstroke, butterfly
- Club: Etobicoke Swim Club
Medal record
Women's swimming
Representing Canada
Olympic Games
Bronze medal – third place	1984 Los Angeles	4×100 m medley
Pan American Games
Silver medal – second place	1983 Caracas	100 m butterfly
Silver medal – second place	1983 Caracas	200 m medley
Silver medal – second place	1983 Caracas	4×100 m medley
Bronze medal – third place	1983 Caracas	400 m medley
Commonwealth Games
Gold medal – first place	1982 Brisbane	4×100 m medley
Bronze medal – third place	1982 Brisbane	100 m butterfly
Bronze medal – third place	1982 Brisbane	400 m medley

Michelle A. MacPherson (born May 11, 1966), also known by her married name Michelle Hojnacki, is a former backstroke and butterfly swimmer from Canada. After being selected for the Canadian Olympic swim team for the 1980 Summer Olympics in Moscow, MacPherson was unable to participate because of the United States-led boycott of the Moscow Olympics. Four years later, she represented Canada at the 1984 Summer Olympics in Los Angeles, California. There McPherson won a bronze medal in the women's 4×100-metre medley relay, alongside Canadian teammates Anne Ottenbrite, Reema Abdo and Pamela Rai.

== See also ==
- List of Olympic medalists in swimming (women)
