= Laurence Bensimon =

French swimmer

Personal information
- Born: 24 January 1963 (age 63)

Sport
- Sport: Swimming
Medal record
Representing France
Mediterranean Games
| Gold medal – first place | 1983 Casablanca | 200m freestyle |
| Silver medal – second place | 1983 Casablanca | 400m individual medley |
| Bronze medal – third place | 1983 Casablanca | 400m freestyle |

Laurence Bensimon (born 24 January 1963) is a French freestyle and medley swimmer. She competed in four events at the 1984 Summer Olympics.
