= Kathy Wong =

Hong Kong swimmer (born 1967)

Personal information
- Full name: Kathryn Florence Wong
- Nationality: Hong Konger
- Born: 1 September 1967 (age 58)
- Height: 166 cm (5 ft 5 in)
- Weight: 54 kg (119 lb)

Sport
- Sport: Swimming
- Strokes: Backstroke, butterfly
- Club: Hong Kong

Kathryn Florence Wong (born 1 September 1967) is a Hong Kong backstroke, butterfly and freestyle swimmer. She competed in five events at the 1984 Summer Olympics.
