= Virginia Sachero =

Argentine swimmer (born 1961)

Personal information
- Born: 14 April 1961 (age 65)

Sport
- Sport: Swimming

Virginia Sachero (born 14 April 1961) is an Argentine swimmer. She competed in two events at the 1984 Summer Olympics.
