= Karin Seick =

German former swimmer (born 1961)

Personal information
- Nationality: German
- Born: 11 November 1961 (age 64) Winsen an der Luhe, Niedersachsen
- Height: 1.82 m (6 ft 0 in)
- Weight: 63 kg (139 lb)

Sport
- Sport: Swimming
- Strokes: Butterfly
Medal record
Women's Swimming
Representing West Germany
Silver medal – second place	1984 Los Angeles	4x100 m medley relay
Bronze medal – third place	1984 Los Angeles	100 m butterfly
Bronze medal – third place	1984 Los Angeles	4x100 m freestyle relay

Karin Seick (born 11 November 1961 in Winsen an der Luhe) is a German former swimmer who competed in the 1984 Summer Olympics and in the 1988 Summer Olympics.
