= Susanne Schuster =

German former swimmer (born 1963)

Personal information
- Born: May 9, 1963 (age 63) Bietigheim, West Germany

Sport
- Sport: Swimming
Medal record
Representing West Germany
Olympic Games
Bronze medal – third place	1984 Los Angeles	4x100 m freestyle relay
European Championships
Silver medal – second place	1981 Split	4x100m freestyle relay
Silver medal – second place	1985 Sofia	4x100m freestyle relay
Bronze medal – third place	1983 Rome	4x100m freestyle relay
Bronze medal – third place	1987 Strasbourg	4x100m medley relay

Susanne Schuster (born 9 May 1963) is a German former swimmer who competed in the 1984 Summer Olympics.
