= Chikako Nakamori =

Japanese swimmer (born 1967)

Personal information
- Born: April 11, 1967 (age 59)

Sport
- Sport: Swimming
Medal record
Representing Japan
Asian Games
Gold medal – first place	1982 New Delhi	4x100m freestyle relay
Gold medal – first place	1986 Seoul	200m freestyle
Silver medal – second place	1982 New Delhi	100m freestyle
Silver medal – second place	1986 Seoul	4x100m freestyle relay

Chikako Nakamori (中森 智佳子, Nakamori Chikako; born 11 April 1967) is a Japanese former freestyle swimmer who competed in the 1984 Summer Olympics and in the 1988 Summer Olympics.
