= Ding Jilian =

Chinese swimmer

Personal information
- Born: 5 August 1963 (age 62)

Sport
- Sport: Swimming

Ding Jilian (simplified Chinese: 丁继连; traditional Chinese: 丁繼連; pinyin: Dīng Jìlián; born 5 August 1963) is a Chinese former swimmer who competed in the 1984 Summer Olympics held in Los Angeles, CA. At the age of 20, Ding competed in the 100 meter freestyle, and the 4 × 100 meter medley races. Ding's rank for the 100 meter freestyle was 22nd, and the Chinese team came ninth in the medley relay.

Ding was 5'5 and weighed 132 lbs at the time of competition.
