= Karen Slowing-Aceituno =

Guatemalan swimmer (born 1968)

Karin Slowing
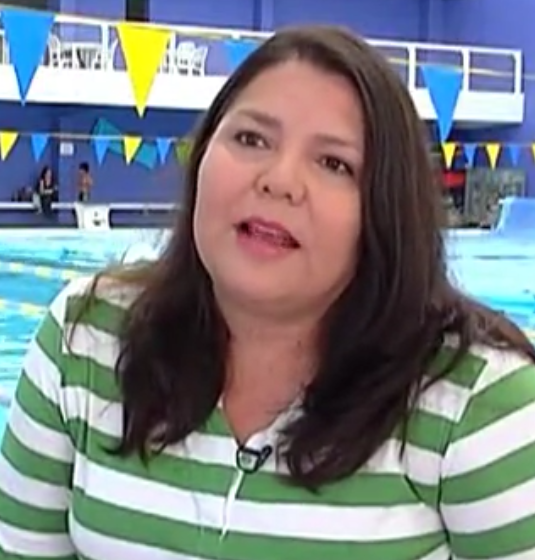
- Karin Slowing coaching in 2012

Personal information
- Nationality: Guatemalan
- Born: 22 December 1968 (age 57)
- Height: 1.64 m (5 ft 5 in)
- Weight: 55 kg (121 lb)

Sport
- Sport: Swimming
- Strokes: Freestyle

Karen Slowing-Aceituno (born 22 December 1968) is a Guatemalan former swimmer who competed in the 1984 Summer Olympics. She competed in the 100 metres, 400 m and 800 m freestyle events.

She is the cousin of Melanie Slowing.

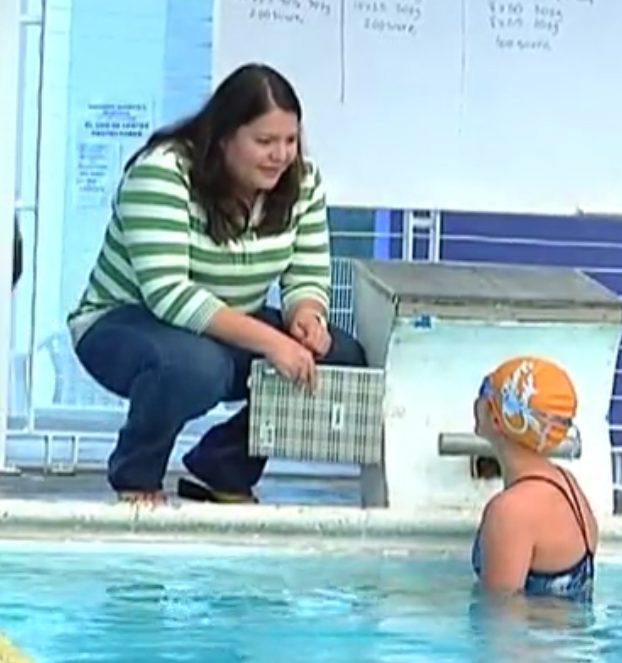
Slowing and her daughter in 2012

Her daughter Valerie Gruest was an Olympic swimmer in 2016 at 400 and 800 m freestyle.
