= Ina Beyermann =

German swimmer (born 1965)

Personal information
- National team: West Germany
- Born: April 11, 1965 (age 61) Leverkusen, West Germany

Sport
- Sport: Swimming
Medal record
Representing West Germany
Olympic Games
Silver medal – second place	1984 Los Angeles	4x100 m medley relay
Bronze medal – third place	1984 Los Angeles	200 m butterfly
European Championships
Silver medal – second place	1983 Rome	4x200m freestyle relay
Bronze medal – third place	1983 Rome	4x100m freestyle relay

Ina Beyermann (born 11 April 1965 in Leverkusen) is a German former swimmer who competed in the 1984 Summer Olympics and in the 1988 Summer Olympics.
