= Iris Zscherpe =

German swimmer (born 1967)

Personal information
- Born: January 7, 1967 (age 59)

Sport
- Sport: Swimming
Medal record
Representing West Germany
Olympic Games
Bronze medal – third place	1984 Los Angeles	4x100 m freestyle relay
European Championships
Silver medal – second place	1985 Sofia	4x100m freestyle relay
Bronze medal – third place	1983 Rome	4x100m freestyle relay

Iris Zscherpe (born 7 January 1967) is a German former swimmer who competed in the 1984 Summer Olympics.
