= Kaori Yanase =

Japanese swimmer (born 1967)

Personal information
- Born: September 24, 1967 (age 59)

Sport
- Sport: Swimming
Medal record
Representing Japan
Asian Games
Gold medal – first place	1982 New Delhi	100m freestyle
Gold medal – first place	1982 New Delhi	200m freestyle
Gold medal – first place	1982 New Delhi	4x100m freestyle relay
Gold medal – first place	1982 New Delhi	4x100m medley relay

Kaori Yanase (簗瀬 かおり, Yanase Kaori; born 24 September 1967) is a Japanese former freestyle swimmer. She won the gold medal in 100m at 1982 Asian Games in New Delhi. Later, she competed in the 1984 Summer Olympics.
