= Maria Kardum =

Swedish swimmer

Personal information
- Born: 21 July 1968 Kristianstad, Sweden
- Height: 1.67 m (5 ft 6 in)
- Weight: 54 kg (119 lb)

Sport
- Sport: Swimming
- Club: Kristiansstads SLS
Medal record
Women's swimming
Representing Sweden
European Championships
Bronze medal – third place	1985 Sofia	4×200 m freestyle

Maria Kardum (born 21 July 1968) is a retired Swedish swimmer who won a bronze medal at the 1985 European Aquatics Championships. She competed in four freestyle and medley events at the 1984 Summer Olympics with the best achievement of seventh place in the 4 × 100 m freestyle relay.
