= Uytengsu Aquatics Center =

Aquatic center In Los Angeles, California, United States

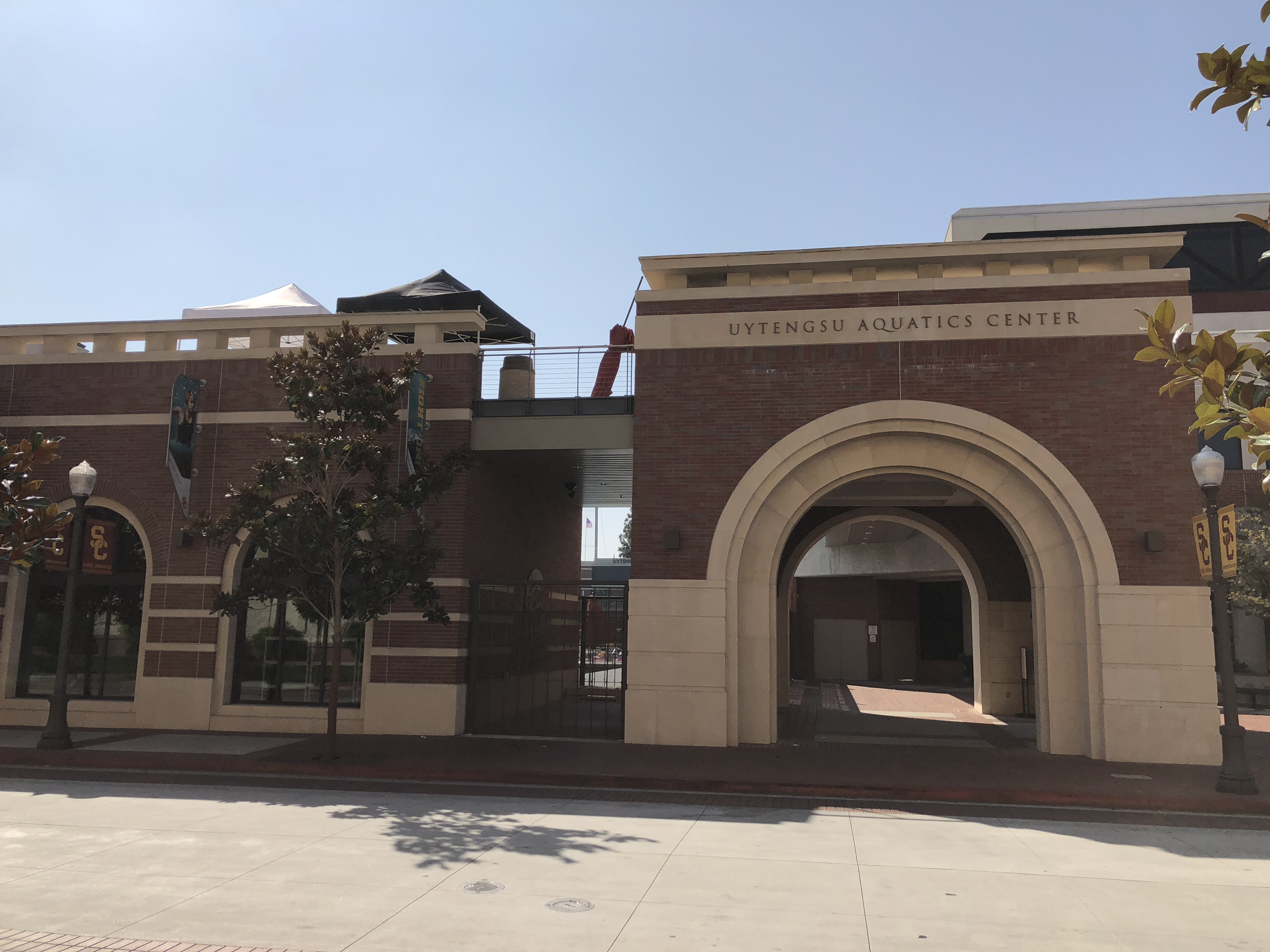
- Interactive map of Uytengsu Aquatics Center
- Location: 1026 W. 34th St. Los Angeles
- Coordinates: 34°1′26.65″N 118°17′19.20″W
- Owner: University of Southern California
- Operator: USC Trojans athletics
- Capacity: 2,500

Construction
- Opened: 1983

Tenants
- USC Trojans men's swimming and diving (NCAA); USC Trojans women's swimming and diving (NCAA)

The Uytengsu Aquatics Center (originally the McDonald's Olympic Swim Stadium) is a 2,500-seat outdoor aquatics venue located on the campus of the University of Southern California in Los Angeles. The facility features two pools: a long course pool (50x25 meters), and a diving well (25x25 yards) with towers. The facility is the home pool for the USC Trojans swimming and diving teams.

The facility was originally constructed for the 1984 Summer Olympics, and opened in July 1983. Financial assistance for the construction of the facility came from McDonald's, and for the first 29 years of its existence, the stadium bore the name McDonald's Olympic Swim Stadium.

At the time of the '84 Games, it was called the "Olympic Swim Stadium", and was the main aquatics venue at the Games, hosting competitions in swimming, diving, and synchronized swimming. (Water polo was held at Raleigh Runnels Memorial Pool in Malibu, California.) For the Games, the facility featured temporary bleacher seating around the two pools, which was removed after the Games. In 1989, the Lyon Center was built on a portion of the land where the Games stands were.

The pool has hosted several high-level national meets since 1984, including the 1989 U.S. Swimming Nationals, the Swimming competitions at the 1991 U.S. Olympic Festival, and the 1993 U.S. Diving Nationals. It hosted the NCAA Women's Water Polo Championship in 2002 and is slated to host again in 2014. It also hosted the NCAA Men's Water Polo Championship in 2012.

The pool was closed in 2013, was rebuilt, and reopened in 2014 with its current name, a homage to USC alumnus, Filipino businessman Fred Uytengsu, who donated $8 million for the renovations. The pool is named for former USC swim coach Peter Daland, while the diving tower was dedicated to Olympian diver Sammy Lee.

== Gallery ==
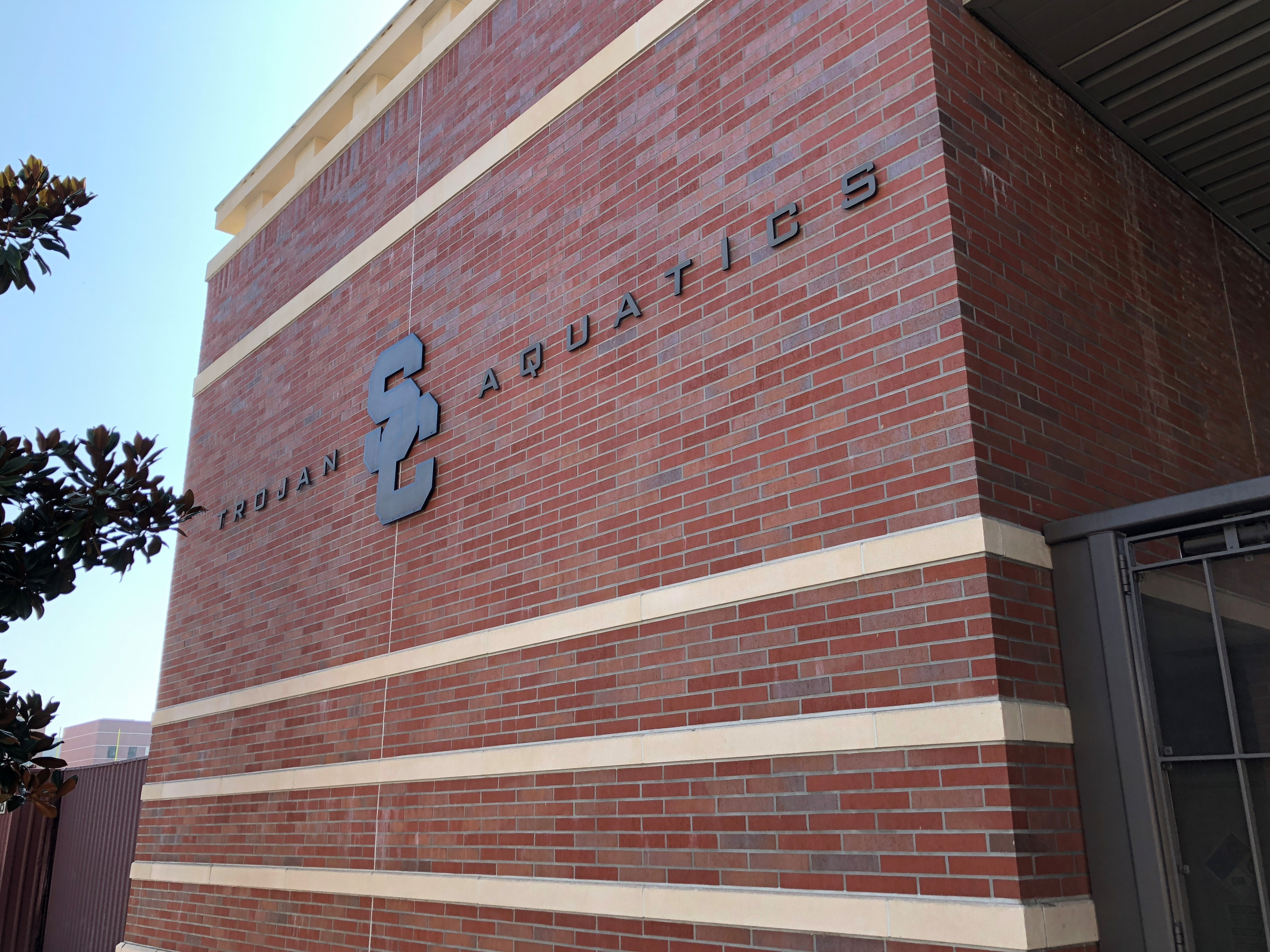
Uytengsu Aquatics Center SC Trojan Aquatics

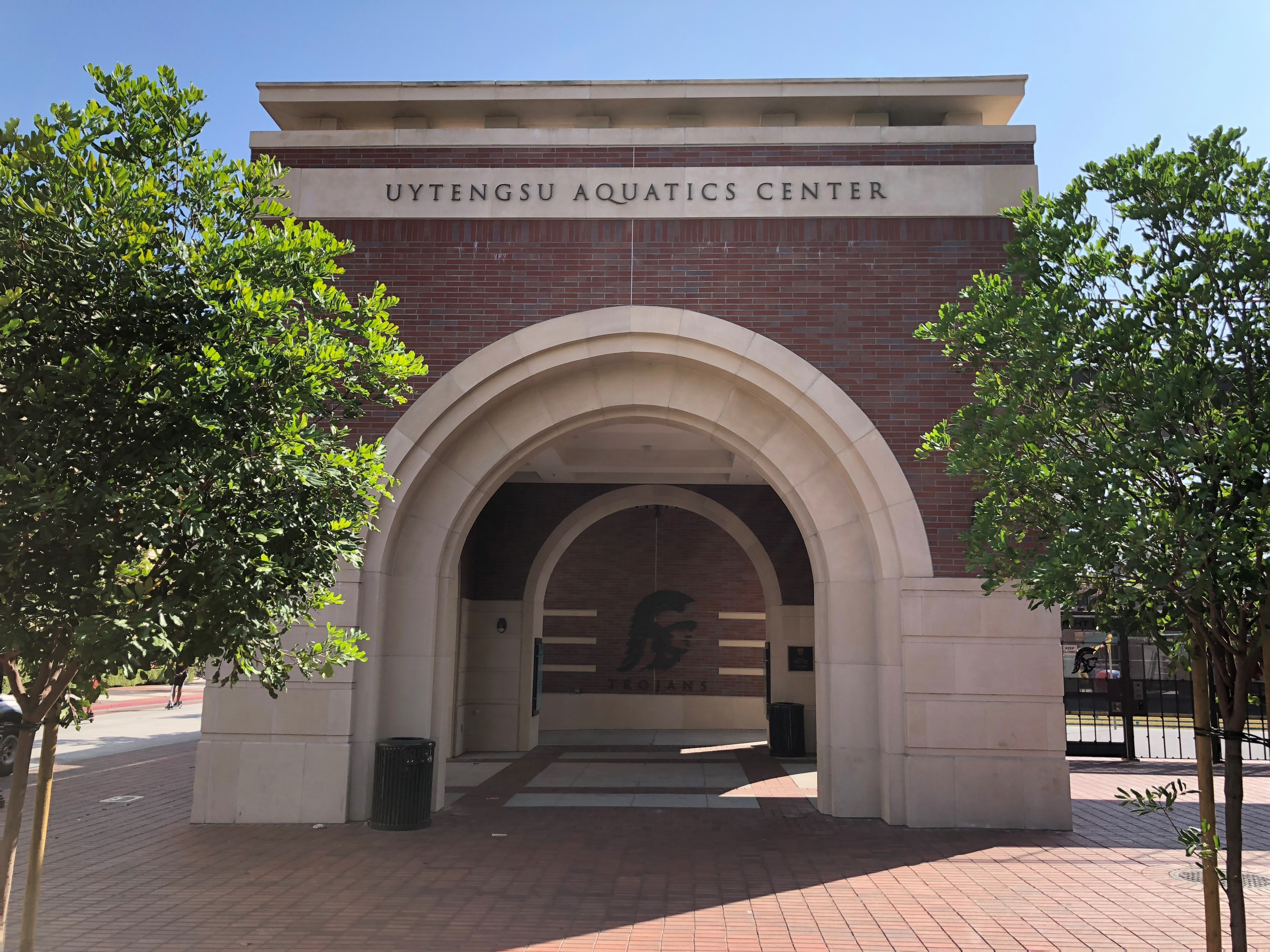
Uytengsu Aquatics Center Trojan

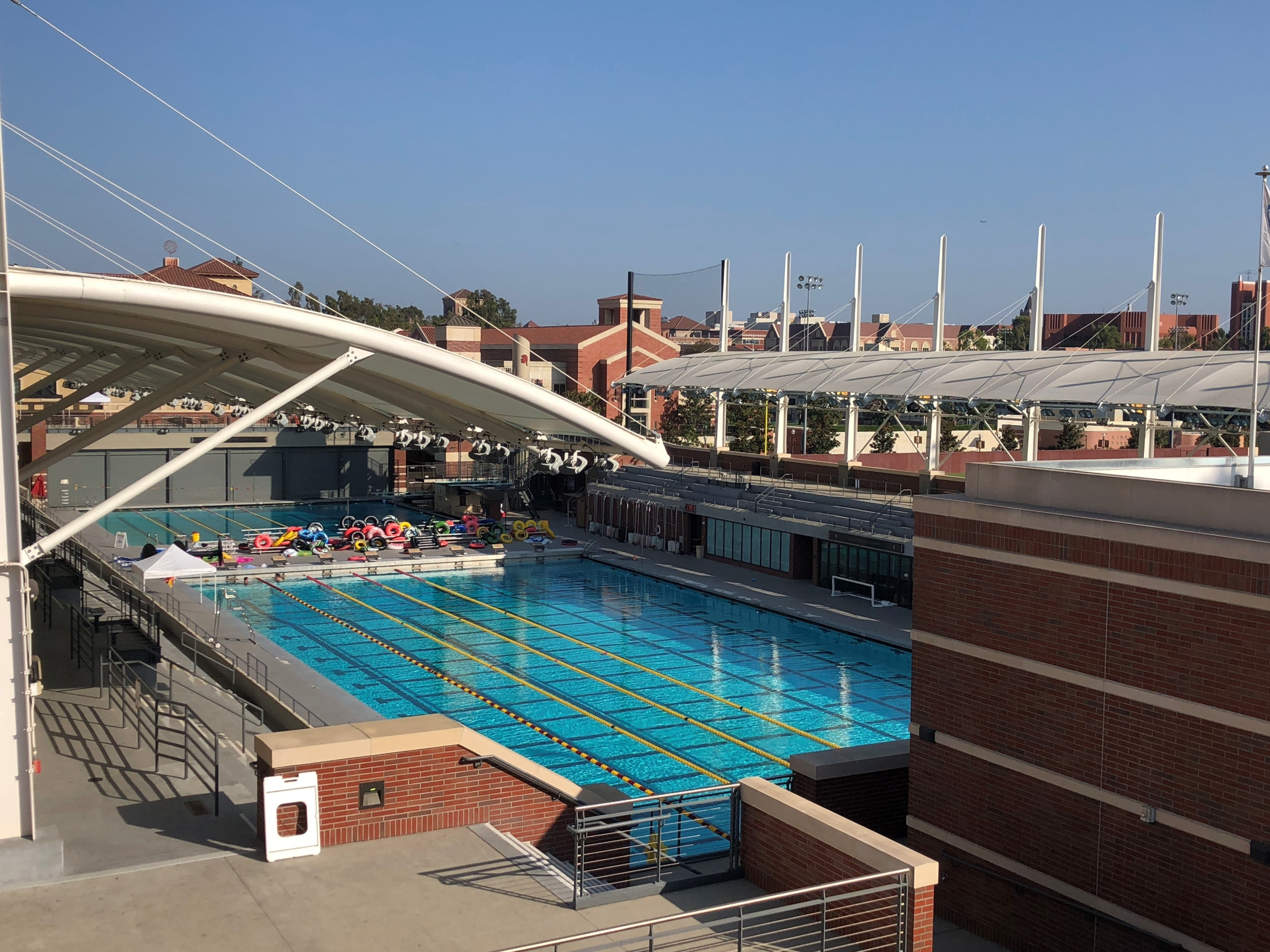
Uytengsu Aquatics Center Peter Daland Pool and Dive Well

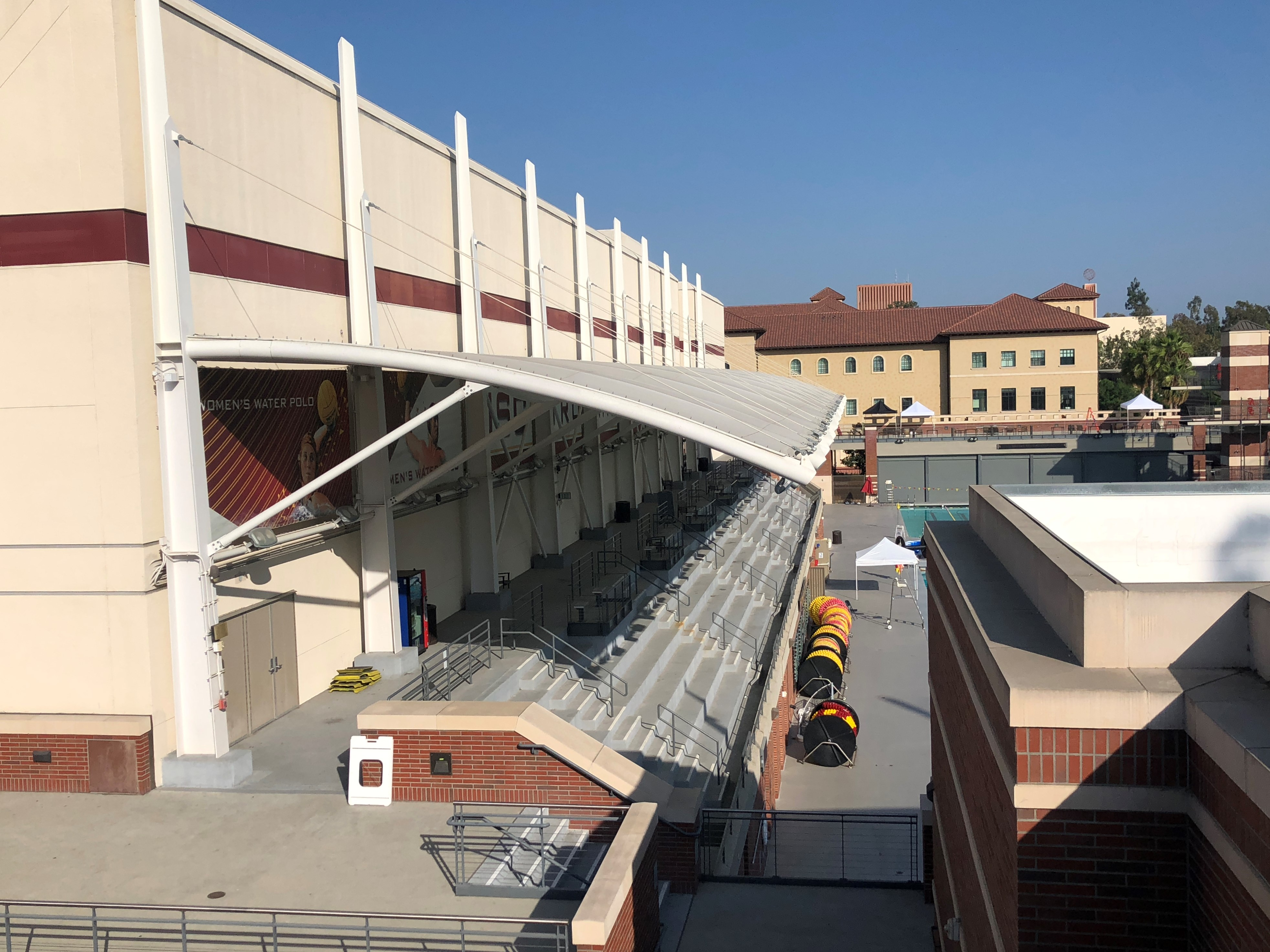
Uytengsu Aquatics Center Grandstand

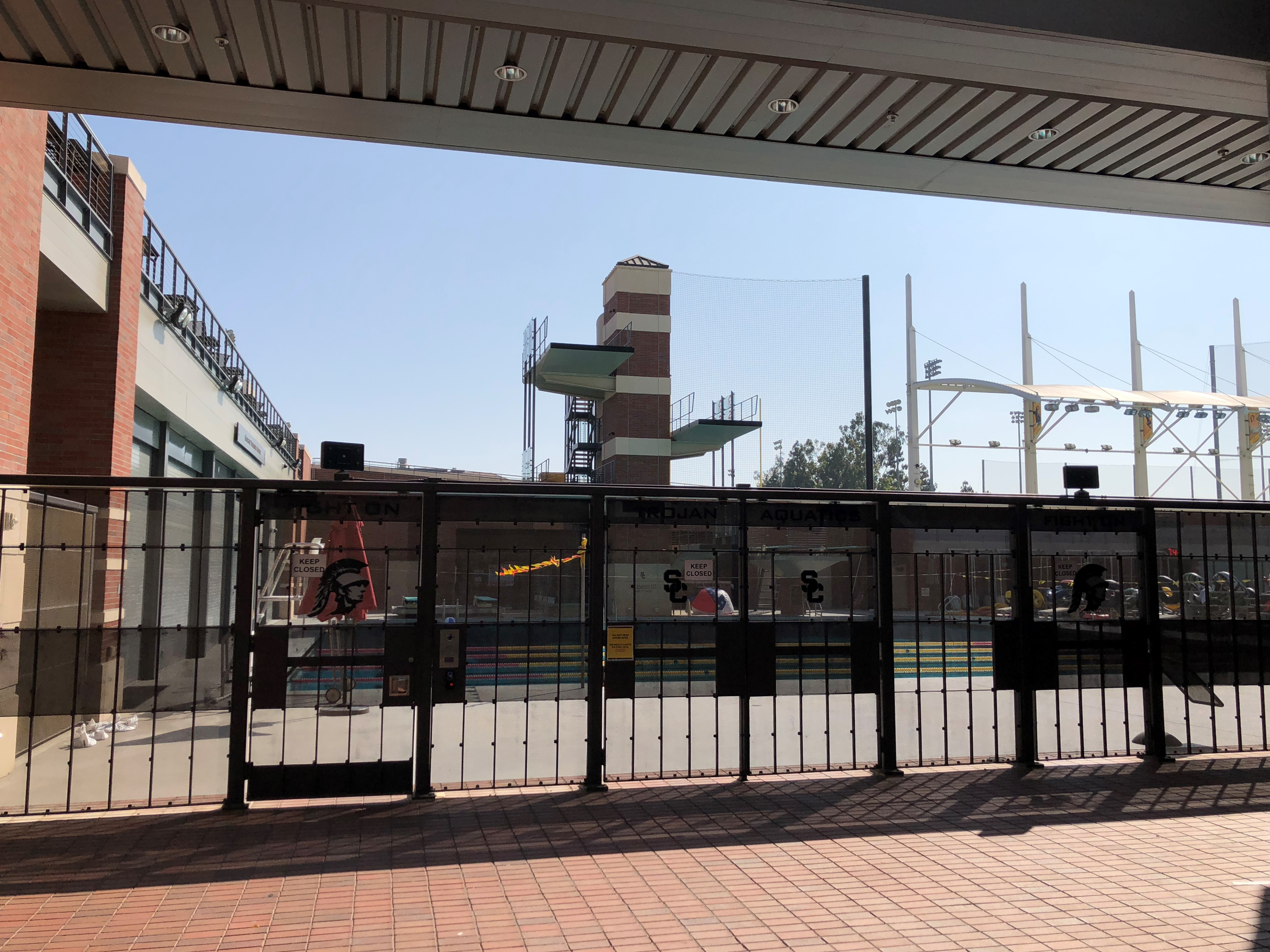
Uytengsu Aquatics Center Dive Well

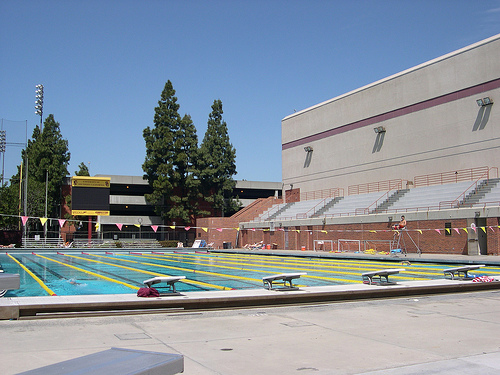
McDonald's Olympic Swim Stadium (1983–2013)
