= June Croft =

English swimmer (born 1963)

Personal information
- Full name: June Alexandra Croft
- National team: Great Britain
- Born: 17 June 1963 (age 63) Ashton-in-Makerfield, England
- Height: 1.70 m (5 ft 7 in)
- Weight: 60 kg (132 lb; 9 st 6 lb)

Sport
- Sport: Swimming
- Strokes: Freestyle
- Club: Wigan Wasps Swim Club
Medal record
Women's swimming
Representing Great Britain
Olympic Games
Silver medal – second place	1980 Moscow	4×100 m medley
Bronze medal – third place	1984 Los Angeles	400 m freestyle
Representing England
Commonwealth Games
Gold medal – first place	1982 Brisbane	100 m freestyle
Gold medal – first place	1982 Brisbane	200 m freestyle
Gold medal – first place	1982 Brisbane	4×100 m freestyle
Silver medal – second place	1982 Brisbane	4×100 m medley
Silver medal – second place	1990 Auckland	4×200 m freestyle
Bronze medal – third place	1982 Brisbane	400 m freestyle
Bronze medal – third place	1990 Auckland	4×100 m freestyle

June Alexandra Croft (born 17 June 1963) is an English former freestyle swimmer.

== Swimming career ==
Croft represented Great Britain at three consecutive Summer Olympics, starting in 1980. At her Olympic debut in Moscow, she won the silver medal in the women's 4×100-metre medley relay, followed by the bronze medal in the women's 400-metre freestyle four years later at the 1984 Summer Olympics in Los Angeles.

She represented England and won five medals at the 1982 Commonwealth Games in Brisbane, Queensland, Australia; triple gold in the 100 and 200 metres freestyle and 4×100 metres relay, a silver in the medley relay and a bronze in the 4×200 metres freestyle relay. Eight years later she represented England and won a silver and bronze in the freestyle relays events, at the 1990 Commonwealth Games in Auckland, New Zealand.

She is a four times consecutive winner of the ASA National British Championships title over 100 metres freestyle (1980–1983), twice the 200 metres freestyle champion in 1982 and 1983, the 400 metres freestyle champion in 1982 and the 200 metres medley champion in 1982.

== See also ==
- List of Olympic medalists in swimming (women)
- List of Commonwealth Games medallists in swimming (women)
