= Conny van Bentum =

Dutch swimmer (born 1965)

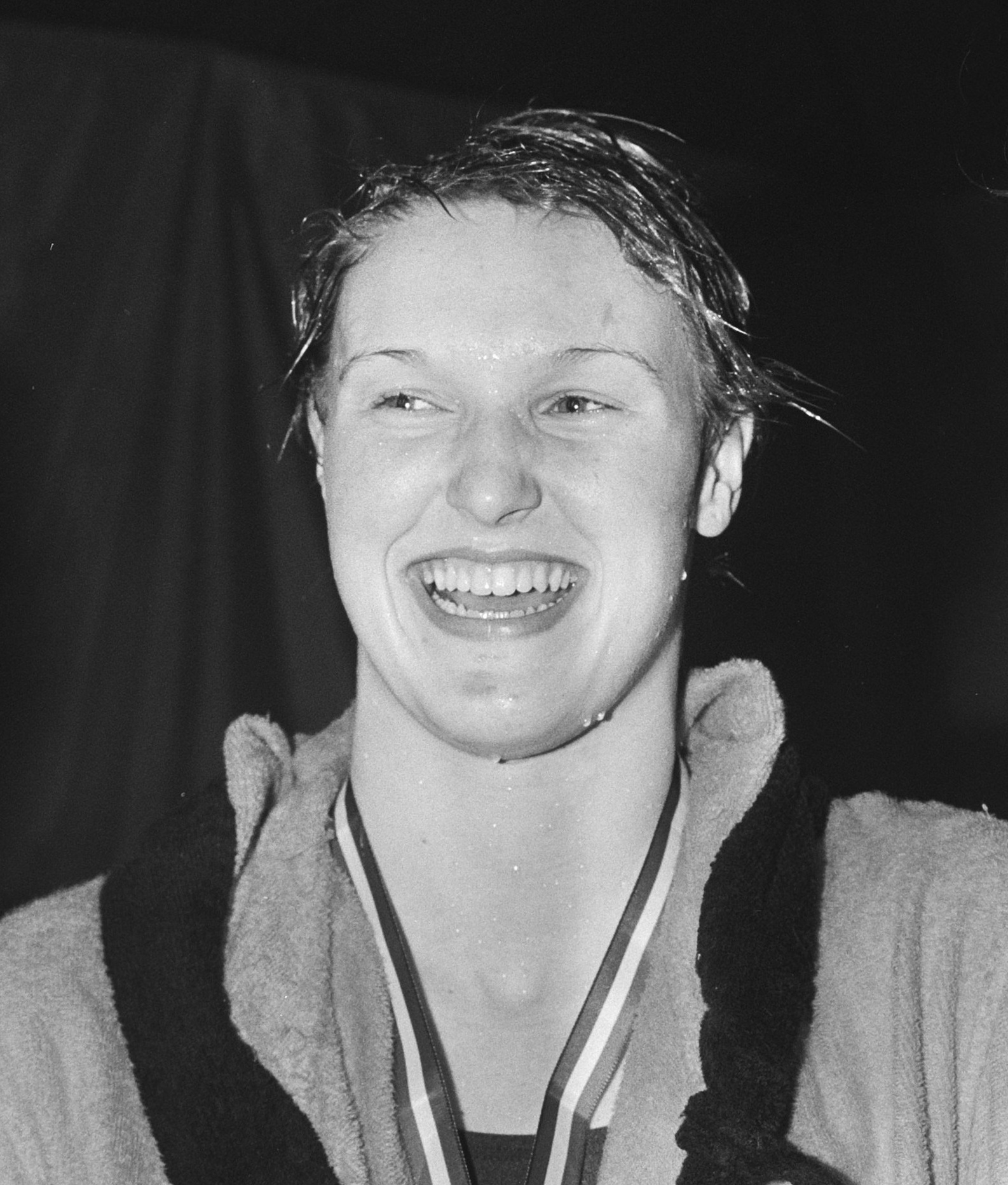
- Conny van Bentum in 1983

Personal information
- Full name: Cornelia van Bentum
- Nationality: Netherlands
- Born: 12 August 1965 (age 60) Barneveld, Netherlands

Sport
- Sport: Swimming
- Strokes: Butterfly
Medal record
Olympic Games
Silver medal – second place	1984 Los Angeles	4×100 m freestyle
Silver medal – second place	1988 Seoul	4×100 m freestyle
Bronze medal – third place	1980 Moscow	4×100 m freestyle
World Championships (LC)
Bronze medal – third place	1982 Guayaquil	4×100 m freestyle
Bronze medal – third place	1986 Madrid	100 m freestyle
Bronze medal – third place	1986 Madrid	4×100 m freestyle
Bronze medal – third place	1986 Madrid	4×200 m freestyle
Bronze medal – third place	1986 Madrid	4×100 m medley
European Championships (LC)
Silver medal – second place	1983 Rome	4×100 m freestyle
Silver medal – second place	1983 Rome	4×100 m medley
Silver medal – second place	1985 Sofia	4×200 m freestyle
Bronze medal – third place	1981 Split	100 m freestyle
Bronze medal – third place	1981 Split	200 m freestyle
Bronze medal – third place	1981 Split	4×100 m freestyle
Bronze medal – third place	1983 Rome	100 m freestyle
Bronze medal – third place	1983 Rome	200 m freestyle
Bronze medal – third place	1983 Rome	200 m butterfly
Bronze medal – third place	1983 Rome	4×200 m freestyle
Bronze medal – third place	1985 Sofia	100 m freestyle
Bronze medal – third place	1985 Sofia	4×100 m freestyle
Summer Universiade
Gold medal – first place	1985 Kobe	100 m freestyle
Gold medal – first place	1985 Kobe	200 m freestyle
Silver medal – second place	1987 Zagreb	100 m freestyle
Silver medal – second place	1987 Zagreb	100 m butterfly
Bronze medal – third place	1985 Kobe	100 m butterfly
Bronze medal – third place	1987 Zagreb	50 m freestyle

Cornelia "Conny" van Bentum (born 12 August 1965, in Barneveld) is a former butterfly and freestyle swimmer from the Netherlands.

== Swimming career ==
Van Bentum competed in three consecutive Summer Olympics for her native country, starting in 1980. At each of those swimming tournaments she won a medal with the 4×100 m freestyle relay team: one bronze (1980), and two silvers (1984 and 1988).

In 1988 she won the 'Open' ASA National British Championships over 50 metres freestyle, 100 metres freestyle and 200 metres freestyle. She also won the 100 metres butterfly and the 200 metres butterfly titles in 1988.

Awards
Preceded by Annemarie Verstappen	Dutch Sportswoman of the Year; 1983	Succeeded by Ria Stalman
