= Silvia Persi =

Italian swimmer (born 1965)

Personal information
- Full name: Silvia Persi
- Nationality: Italian
- Born: 13 October 1965 (age 61) Rome, Italy
- Height: 1.73 m (5 ft 8 in)
- Weight: 60 kg (132 lb)

Sport
- Sport: Swimming
- Strokes: Freestyle
Medal record
Women's swimming
Representing Italy
Mediterranean Games
Gold medal – first place	1987 Latakia	100 m freestyle
Gold medal – first place	1987 Latakia	4x100 m freestyle
Gold medal – first place	1987 Latakia	4x100 m medley
Silver medal – second place	1987 Latakia	200 m freestyle
Summer Universiade
Bronze medal – third place	1987 Zagreb	200 m freestyle

Silvia Persi (born 13 October 1965) is an Italian former swimmer who competed in the 1984 Summer Olympics and in the 1988 Summer Olympics.
