= Swimming at the 1984 Summer Olympics =

Swimming at the Games of the XXIII Olympiad
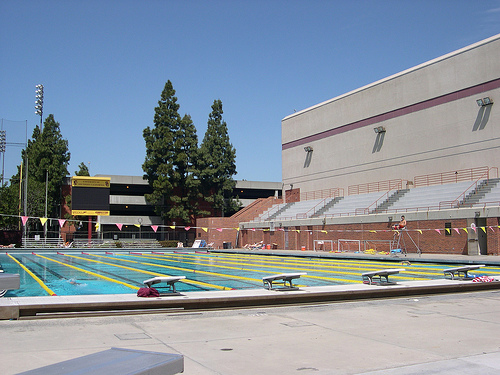
- Venue: McDonald's Olympic Swim Stadium
- Dates: July 29 – August 4, 1984
- No. of events: 29
- Competitors: 494 from 67 nations

The swimming competitions of the 1984 Summer Olympics were held at the McDonald's Olympic Swim Stadium, located on the University of Southern California (USC) campus. There were a total of 494 participants from 67 countries competing.

This was the first Olympic Games at which only two swimmers per country, per event, were permitted; previously, three swimmers were allowed and many countries would sweep the medal stand. In addition, the 200-metre individual medley for both men and women returned to the program from a twelve-year absence, following a proposal by the United States Olympic & Paralympic Committee (USOPC).

== Medal table ==
Rank	Nation	Gold	Silver	Bronze	Total
1	United States	21	13	0	34
2	Canada	4	3	3	10
3	West Germany	2	3	6	11
4	Netherlands	2	1	3	6
5	Australia	1	5	6	12
6	Great Britain	0	1	4	5
7	France	0	1	1	2
8	Brazil	0	1	0	1
9	Sweden	0	0	2	2
10	Belgium	0	0	1	1
10	Romania	0	0	1	1
10	Switzerland	0	0	1	1
10	Venezuela	0	0	1	1
Totals (13 entries)		30	28	29	87

== Medal summary ==
=== Men's events ===
Games	Gold		Silver		Bronze	
100 m freestyle	Rowdy Gaines; United States	49.80 OR	Mark Stockwell; Australia	50.24	Per Johansson; Sweden	50.31
200 m freestyle	Michael Gross; West Germany	1:47.44 WR	Mike Heath; United States	1:49.10	Thomas Fahrner; West Germany	1:49.69
400 m freestyle	George DiCarlo; United States	3:51.23	John Mykkanen; United States	3:51.49	Justin Lemberg; Australia	3:51.79
1500 m freestyle	Mike O'Brien; United States	15:05.20	George DiCarlo; United States	15:10.59	Stefan Pfeiffer; West Germany	15:12.11
100 m backstroke	Rick Carey; United States	55.79	Dave Wilson; United States	56.35	Mike West; Canada	56.49
200 m backstroke	Rick Carey; United States	2:00.23	Frédéric Delcourt; France	2:01.75	Cameron Henning; Canada	2:02.37
100 m breaststroke	Steve Lundquist; United States	1:01.65 WR	Victor Davis; Canada	1:01.99	Peter Evans; Australia	1:02.97
200 m breaststroke	Victor Davis; Canada	2:13.34 WR	Glenn Beringen; Australia	2:15.79	Étienne Dagon; Switzerland	2:17.41
100 m butterfly	Michael Gross; West Germany	53.08 WR	Pablo Morales; United States	53.23	Glenn Buchanan; Australia	53.85
200 m butterfly	Jon Sieben; Australia	1:57.04 WR	Michael Gross; West Germany	1:57.40	Rafael Vidal; Venezuela	1:57.51
200 m individual medley	Alex Baumann; Canada	2:01.42 WR	Pablo Morales; United States	2:03.05	Neil Cochran; Great Britain	2:04.38
400 m individual medley	Alex Baumann; Canada	4:17.41 WR	Ricardo Prado; Brazil	4:18.45	Rob Woodhouse; Australia	4:20.50
4 × 100 m freestyle relay	United States; Chris Cavanaugh; Mike Heath; Matt Biondi; Rowdy Gaines; Tom Jager*; Robin Leamy*	3:19.03 WR	Australia; Greg Fasala; Neil Brooks; Michael Delany; Mark Stockwell	3:19.68	Sweden; Thomas Lejdström; Per Johansson; Bengt Baron; Mikael Örn; Rikard Milton*; Michael Söderlund*	3:22.69
4 × 200 m freestyle relay	United States; Mike Heath; David Larson; Jeff Float; Bruce Hayes; Geoff Gaberino*; Richard Saeger*	7:15.69 WR	West Germany; Thomas Fahrner; Dirk Korthals; Alexander Schowtka; Michael Gross; Rainer Henkel*	7:15.73	Great Britain; Neil Cochran; Paul Easter; Paul Howe; Andrew Astbury	7:24.78
4 × 100 m medley relay	United States; Rick Carey; Steve Lundquist; Pablo Morales; Rowdy Gaines; Dave Wilson*; Richard Schroeder*; Mike Heath*; Tom Jager*	3:39.30 WR	Canada; Mike West; Victor Davis; Tom Ponting; Sandy Goss	3:43.23	Australia; Mark Kerry; Peter Evans; Glenn Buchanan; Mark Stockwell; Jon Sieben*; Neil Brooks*	3:43.25

* Swimmers who participated in the heats only and received medals.

=== Women's events ===
Games	Gold		Silver		Bronze	
100 m freestyle	Carrie Steinseifer; United States	55.92	none awarded		Annemarie Verstappen; Netherlands	56.08
100 m freestyle	Nancy Hogshead; United States	55.92	none awarded		Annemarie Verstappen; Netherlands	56.08
200 m freestyle	Mary Wayte; United States	1:59.23	Cynthia Woodhead; United States	1:59.50	Annemarie Verstappen; Netherlands	1:59.69
400 m freestyle	Tiffany Cohen; United States	4:07.10 OR	Sarah Hardcastle; Great Britain	4:10.29	June Croft; Great Britain	4:11.49
800 m freestyle	Tiffany Cohen; United States	8:24.95 OR	Michele Richardson; United States	8:30.73	Sarah Hardcastle; Great Britain	8:32.60
100 m backstroke	Theresa Andrews; United States	1:02.55	Betsy Mitchell; United States	1:02.63	Jolanda de Rover; Netherlands	1:02.91
200 m backstroke	Jolanda de Rover; Netherlands	2:12.38	Amy White; United States	2:13.04	Anca Patrascoiu; Romania	2:13.29
100 m breaststroke	Petra van Staveren; Netherlands	1:09.88 OR	Anne Ottenbrite; Canada	1:10.69	Catherine Poirot; France	1:10.70
200 m breaststroke	Anne Ottenbrite; Canada	2:30.38	Susan Rapp; United States	2:31.15	Ingrid Lempereur; Belgium	2:31.40
100 m butterfly	Mary T. Meagher; United States	59.26	Jenna Johnson; United States	1:00.19	Karin Seick; West Germany	1:01.36
200 m butterfly	Mary T. Meagher; United States	2:06.90 OR	Karen Phillips; Australia	2:10.56	Ina Beyermann; West Germany	2:11.91
200 m individual medley	Tracy Caulkins; United States	2:12.64 OR	Nancy Hogshead; United States	2:15.17	Michelle Pearson; Australia	2:15.92
400 m individual medley	Tracy Caulkins; United States	4:39.24	Suzanne Landells; Australia	4:48.30	Petra Zindler; West Germany	4:48.57
4 × 100 m freestyle relay	United States; Jenna Johnson; Carrie Steinseifer; Dara Torres; Nancy Hogshead; Jill Sterkel*; Mary Wayte*	3:43.43	Netherlands; Annemarie Verstappen; Desi Reijers; Elles Voskes; Conny van Bentum; Wilma van Velsen*	3:44.40	West Germany; Iris Zscherpe; Susanne Schuster; Christiane Pielke; Karin Seick	3:45.56
4 × 100 m medley relay	United States; Theresa Andrews; Tracy Caulkins; Mary T. Meagher; Nancy Hogshead; Betsy Mitchell*; Susan Rapp*; Jenna Johnson*; Carrie Steinseifer*	4:08.34	West Germany; Svenja Schlicht; Ute Hasse; Ina Beyermann; Karin Seick	4:11.97	Canada; Reema Abdo; Anne Ottenbrite; Michelle MacPherson; Pamela Rai	4:12.98

*Swimmers who participated in the heats only and received medals.

== Participating nations ==
494 swimmers from 67 nations competed.

- Argentina (6)
- Australia (31)
- Austria (6)
- Bahamas (2)
- Bahrain (2)
- Barbados (1)
- Belgium (4)
- Bermuda (1)
- Brazil (7)
- Canada (37)
- China (14)
- Chinese Taipei (5)
- Colombia (1)
- Costa Rica (1)

- Denmark (3)
- Egypt (8)
- El Salvador (2)
- Fiji (3)
- Finland (2)
- France (16)
- Great Britain (33)
- Greece (3)
- Guatemala (6)
- Honduras (6)
- Hong Kong (8)
- Iceland (4)
- Indonesia (1)

- Ireland (2)
- Israel (3)
- Italy (26)
- Jamaica (4)
- Japan (22)
- Kuwait (5)
- Lebanon (4)
- Malaysia (1)
- Mexico (12)
- Monaco (1)
- Mozambique (2)
- Netherlands (16)
- Netherlands Antilles (3)

- New Zealand (8)
- Norway (3)
- Panama (1)
- Peru (5)
- Philippines (4)
- Portugal (2)
- Puerto Rico (5)
- Romania (2)
- San Marino (2)
- Singapore (4)
- South Korea (3)
- Spain (8)
- Sri Lanka (1)

- Suriname (2)
- Swaziland (1)
- Sweden (24)
- Switzerland (13)
- Trinidad and Tobago (1)
- Tunisia (1)
- Turkey (4)
- Uganda (1)
- United States (43)
- Virgin Islands (7)
- Uruguay (2)
- Venezuela (6)
- West Germany (24)
- Yugoslavia (3)

== See also ==
- Swimming at the Friendship Games
