= Annemarie Verstappen =

Dutch swimmer

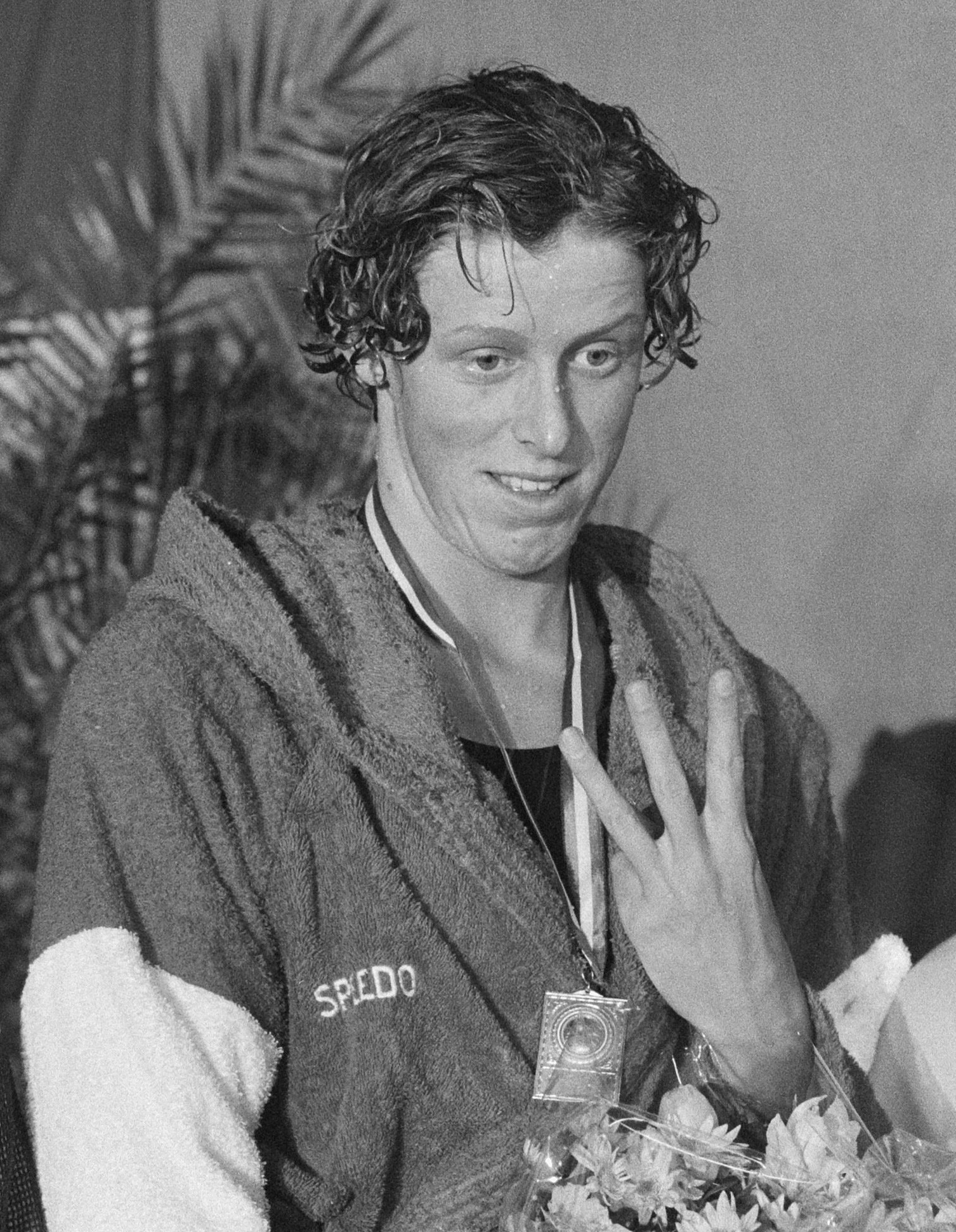
- Annemarie Verstappen in 1985

Medal record

Women's swimming

Representing the Netherlands

Olympic Games
Silver medal – second place	1984 Los Angeles	4×100 m freestyle
Bronze medal – third place	1984 Los Angeles	100 m freestyle
Bronze medal – third place	1984 Los Angeles	200 m freestyle

World Championships (LC)
Gold medal – first place	1982 Guayaquil	200 m freestyle
Silver medal – second place	1982 Guayaquil	100 m freestyle
Bronze medal – third place	1982 Guayaquil	4×100 m freestyle
Bronze medal – third place	1986 Madrid	4×100 m freestyle
Bronze medal – third place	1986 Madrid	4×200 m freestyle
Bronze medal – third place	1986 Madrid	4×100 m medley

European Championships
Silver medal – second place	1983 Rome	4×100 m freestyle
Silver medal – second place	1983 Rome	4×100 m medley
Bronze medal – third place	1981 Split	4×100 m freestyle
Bronze medal – third place	1983 Rome	4×200 m freestyle
Bronze medal – third place	1985 Sofia	4×100 m freestyle

Anna Maria Theodora Petra "Annemarie" Verstappen (born 3 October 1965, in Rosmalen) is a female former freestyle swimmer from the Netherlands.

== Swimming career ==
Verstappen won a total number of three medals at the 1984 Summer Olympics in Los Angeles, United States. In 1982, she became world champion in the 200 metres freestyle at the World Aquatics Championships in Ecuador. At the end of that same year, she was named Dutch Sportswoman of the Year. In July 1983, she broke the world record in the 50 m freestyle.

Despite being of Dutch nationality she won the 200 metres medley title in 1981 at the ASA National British Championships.

== Personal life ==
Her son Vincent Janssen is a professional football player.

== See also ==
- World record progression 50m freestyle
- List of Olympic medalists in swimming (women)
- List of World Aquatics Championships medalists in swimming (women)

Awards
Preceded by Bettine Vriesekoop	Dutch Sportswoman of the Year; 1982	Succeeded by Conny van Bentum
