= Swimming at the 1976 Summer Olympics – Women's 100 metre freestyle =

Women's 100 metre freestyle at the Games of the XXI Olympiad
- Venue: Montreal Olympic pool
- Date: 18 July 1976 (heats & semifinals); 19 July 1976 (finals)
- Competitors: 45 from 25 nations
- Winning time: 56.65 WR

Medalists
1st place, gold medalist(s)		Kornelia Ender; East Germany
2nd place, silver medalist(s)		Petra Priemer; East Germany
3rd place, bronze medalist(s)		Enith Brigitha; Netherlands

The women's 100 metre freestyle event for the 1976 Summer Olympics was held in Montreal, with the final on 19 July 1976.

== Results ==
=== Heats ===
Heat 1

Rank	Athlete	Country	Time	Notes
1	Petra Priemer	East Germany	56.95	Q, OR
2	Rebecca Perrott	New Zealand	57.66	Q
3	Pia Mårtensson	Sweden	59.15	
4	Ida Hansson	Sweden	1:00.22	
5	Shelley Cramer	Virgin Islands	1:00.67	
6	Myriam Mizouni	Tunisia	1:02.42	

Heat 2

Rank	Athlete	Country	Time	Notes
1	Anne Jardin	Canada	57.61	Q
2	Jutta Weber	West Germany	57.71	Q
3	Sachiko Yamazaki	Japan	1:00.43	
4	Regina Nissen	West Germany	1:00.60	
5	Lesleigh Harvey	Australia	1:01.59	
6	Deirdre Sheehan	Ireland	1:02.11	
7	Vilborg Sverrisdóttir	Iceland	1:03.26	

Heat 3

Rank	Athlete	Country	Time	Notes
1	Jill Sterkel	United States	57.41	Q
2	Guylaine Berger	France	58.79	Q
3	Irina Vlasova	Soviet Union	58.99	
4	Elaine Gray	Great Britain	1:00.31	
5	Ivis Poleo	Venezuela	1:03.07	
6	Karen Robertson	Hong Kong	1:04.29	

Heat 4

Rank	Athlete	Country	Time	Notes
1	Shirley Babashoff	United States	58.06	Q
2	Barbara Clark	Canada	58.29	Q
3	Susan Edmondson	Great Britain	1:00.64	
4	Berber Kamstra	Netherlands	1:00.68	
5	Geert Boekhout	Belgium	1:00.76	
6	Marianela Huen	Venezuela	1:02.51	
7	Georgina Osorio	Panama	1:03.88	

Heat 5

Rank	Athlete	Country	Time	Notes
1	Claudia Hempel	East Germany	57.35	Q
2	Lene Jenssen	Norway	58.10	Q
3	Jenny Tate	Australia	58.78	Q
4	Marina Klyuchnikova	Soviet Union	59.30	
5	Ratchaneewan Bulakul	Thailand	1:01.33	
6	Rossana Juncos	Argentina	1:01.89	

Heat 6

Rank	Athlete	Country	Time	Notes
1	Enith Brigitha	Netherlands	56.61	Q, OR
2	Kim Peyton	United States	57.26	Q
3	Ineke Ran	Netherlands	58.08	Q
4	Drue Le Guier	Australia	59.40	
5	Beate Jasch	West Germany	1:00.80	
6	María París	Costa Rica	1:01.53	

Heat 7

Rank	Athlete	Country	Time	Notes
1	Kornelia Ender	East Germany	55.81	Q, OR
2	Gail Amundrud	Canada	58.01	Q
3	Lyubov Kobzova	Soviet Union	58.93	
4	Anne Richard	Belgium	59.11	
5	Diana Olsson	Sweden	1:00.46	
6	Susana Coppo	Argentina	1:02.46	
7	Jane Fayer	Puerto Rico	1:02.89	

=== Semifinals ===
Heat 1

Rank	Athlete	Country	Time	Notes
1	Kim Peyton	United States	56.89	Q
2	Enith Brigitha	Netherlands	57.08	Q
3	Jill Sterkel	United States	57.19	Q
4	Barbara Clark	Canada	57.72	
5	Gail Amundrud	Canada	58.10	
6	Rebecca Perrott	New Zealand	58.13	
7	Ineke Ran	Netherlands	58.50	
8	Guylaine Berger	France	58.62	

Heat 2

Rank	Athlete	Country	Time	Notes
1	Kornelia Ender	East Germany	55.82	Q
2	Shirley Babashoff	United States	56.95	Q
3	Claudia Hempel	East Germany	57.05	Q
4	Petra Priemer	East Germany	57.21	Q
5	Jutta Weber	West Germany	57.35	Q
6	Anne Jardin	Canada	57.78	
7	Lene Jenssen	Norway	58.10	
8	Jenny Tate	Australia	58.88	

=== Final ===
Rank	Athlete	Country	Time	Notes
1	Kornelia Ender	East Germany	55.65	WR
2	Petra Priemer	East Germany	56.49	
3	Enith Brigitha	Netherlands	56.65	
4	Kim Peyton	United States	56.81	
5	Shirley Babashoff	United States	56.95	
6	Claudia Hempel	East Germany	56.99	
7	Jill Sterkel	United States	57.06	
8	Jutta Weber	West Germany	57.26	
