= Swimming at the 1976 Summer Olympics – Women's 4 × 100 metre freestyle relay =

Women's 4 × 100 metre freestyle relay at the Games of the XXI Olympiad
- Venue: Olympic Pool
- Date: 25 July 1976 (heats & final)
- Competitors: 60 from 14 nations
- Teams: 14
- Winning time: 3:44.82 WR

Medalists
1st place, gold medalist(s)		Kim Peyton, Wendy Boglioli, Jill Sterkel, Shirley Babashoff, Jennifer Hooker*	United States
2nd place, silver medalist(s)		Kornelia Ender, Petra Priemer, Andrea Pollack, Claudia Hempel	East Germany
3rd place, bronze medalist(s)		Gail Amundrud, Barbara Clark, Becky Smith, Anne Jardin; *Indicates the swimmer only competed in the preliminary heats.	Canada

The women's 4 × 100 metre freestyle relay event for the 1976 Summer Olympics was held in Montreal, with the final on 25 July 1976.

U.S. victory over East German dopers who received state support from the Soviet Bloc is often considered the greatest upset in swimming history. East Germans swept most of the other medals and even finished first and second in the women's 100m freestyle event while the US didn't win a medal.

== Heats ==
Heat 1

Place	Swimmers	Time	Notes
1	Jill Sterkel, Wendy Boglioli, Jennifer Hooker, Kim Peyton (USA)	3:50.27	
2	Ineke Ran, Linda Faber, Annelies Maas, Enith Brigitha (NED)	3:53.40	
3	Guylaine Berger, Sylvie Le Noach, Caroline Carpentier, Chantal Schertz (FRA)	3:56.89	
4	Pia Mårtensson, Ylva Persson, Gunilla Lundberg, Ida Hansson (SWE)	3:57.48	
5	Jutta Weber, Gudrun Beckmann, Regina Nissen, Marion Platten (FRG)	3:58.09	
6	Anne Richard, Carine Verbauwen, Chantal Grimard, Geert Boekhout (BEL)	4:00.35	
7	Vania Vázquez, Ivis Poleo, Marianela Huen, María Pérez (VEN)	4:12.81	

Heat 2

Place	Swimmers	Time	Notes
1	Kornelia Ender, Petra Priemer, Andrea Pollack, Claudia Hempel (GDR)	3:48.95	
2	Gail Amundrud, Barbara Clark, Debbie Clarke, Anne Jardin (CAN)	3:49.69	
3	Lyubov Kobzova, Irina Vlasova, Marina Klyuchnikova, Larisa Tsaryova (URS)	3:53.67	
4	Jenny Tate, Lesleigh Harvey, Tracey Wickham, Drue Le Guier (AUS)	3:58.87	
5	Debbie Hill, Ann Bradshaw, Susan Edmondson, Elaine Gray (GBR)	4:00.97	
6	Susana Coppo, Patricia Spohn, Claudia Bellotto, Rossana Juncos (ARG)	4:14.57	
7	Diana Hatler, Angela López, María Mock, Jane Fayer (PUR)	4:18.40	

== Final ==
Rank	Final	Time
1st place, gold medalist(s)	United States; Kim Peyton; Wendy Boglioli; Jill Sterkel; Shirley Babashoff (Jennifer Hooker)	3:44.82; 56.95; 55.81; 55.78; 56.28
2nd place, silver medalist(s)	East Germany; Kornelia Ender; Petra Priemer; Andrea Pollack; Claudia Hempel	3:45.50; 55.79; 56.16; 56.99; 56.56
3rd place, bronze medalist(s)	Canada; Gail Amundrud; Barbara Clark; Becky Smith; Anne Jardin	3:48.81; 57.60; 57.05; 57.13; 57.03
4.	Netherlands; Ineke Ran; Linda Faber; Annelies Maas; Enith Brigitha	3:51.67; 58.86; 59.42; 57.48; 55.91
5.	Soviet Union; Lyubov Kobzova; Irina Vlasova; Marina Kliyuchnikova; Larisa Tsaryova	3:52.69; 58.07; 58.58; 58.57; 57.47
6.	France; Guylaine Berger; Sylvie Le Noach; Caroline Carpentier; Chantal Schertz	3:56.73; 58.99; 58.76; 59.82; 59.16
7.	Sweden; Pia Mårtensson; Ylva Persson; Diana Olsson; Ida Hansson	3:57.25; 59.06; 59.06; 59.76; 58.86
8.	West Germany; Jutta Weber; Marion Platten; Regina Nissen; Beate Jasch	3:58.33; 58.02; 59.35; 1:00.59; 1:00.37

Parenthesis indicate that the athlete competed in preliminary rounds, but not in the final.
