= Swimming at the 1976 Summer Olympics – Women's 200 metre freestyle =

Women's 200 metre freestyle at the Games of the XXI Olympiad
- Venue: Montreal Olympic pool
- Date: 22 July 1976 (heats & final)
- Competitors: 40 from 22 nations
- Winning time: 1:59.26 WR

Medalists
1st place, gold medalist(s)		Kornelia Ender	East Germany
2nd place, silver medalist(s)		Shirley Babashoff	United States
3rd place, bronze medalist(s)		Enith Brigitha	Netherlands

The women's 200 metre freestyle event for the 1976 Summer Olympics was held in Montreal. The event took place on 22 July.

== Results ==
=== Heats ===
Heat 1

Rank	Athlete	Country	Time	Notes
1	Claudia Hempel	East Germany	2:03.36	Q, OR
2	Larisa Tsaryova	Soviet Union	2:03.98	
3	Jutta Weber	West Germany	2:08.02	
4	Sonya Gray	Australia	2:10.73	
5	Ratchaneewan Bulakul	Thailand	2:12.92	
6	Vilborg Sverrisdóttir	Iceland	2:14.27	

Heat 2

Rank	Athlete	Country	Time	Notes
1	Gail Amundrud	Canada	2:03.85	Q
2	Debbie Clarke	Canada	2:05.10	
3	Lyubov Kobzova	Soviet Union	2:05.55	
4	Gunilla Lundberg	Sweden	2:09.51	
5	Jane Fayer	Puerto Rico	2:19.93	
6	Raphaelynne Lee	Hong Kong	2:20.76	

Heat 3

Rank	Athlete	Country	Time	Notes
1	Irina Vlasova	Soviet Union	2:03.67	Q
2	Rebecca Perrott	New Zealand	2:03.94	
3	Andrea Pollack	East Germany	2:06.12	
4	Marion Platten	West Germany	2:06.70	
5	Regina Nissen	West Germany	2:14.66	
6	Deirdre Sheehan	Ireland	2:15.69	
7	Susana Coppo	Argentina	2:19.26	

Heat 4

Rank	Athlete	Country	Time	Notes
1	Enith Brigitha	Netherlands	2:01.54	Q, OR
2	Jennifer Hooker	United States	2:03.72	Q
3	Anne Richard	Belgium	2:07.90	
4	Lesleigh Harvey	Australia	2:08.60	
5	Pia Mårtensson	Sweden	2:09.85	
6	Ann Bradshaw	Great Britain	2:10.93	
7	Georgina Osorio	Panama	2:19.06	

Heat 5

Rank	Athlete	Country	Time	Notes
1	Shirley Babashoff	United States	2:01.64	Q
2	Annelies Maas	Netherlands	2:03.01	Q
3	Anne Jardin	Canada	2:05.28	
4	Guylaine Berger	France	2:06.74	
5	Susan Edmondson	Great Britain	2:10.08	
6	Vania Vázquez	Venezuela	2:13.54	
7	Shelley Cramer	Virgin Islands	2:14.94	

Heat 6

Rank	Athlete	Country	Time	Notes
1	Kornelia Ender	East Germany	2:02.50	Q
2	Jill Sterkel	United States	2:03.94	
3	Ineke Ran	Netherlands	2:05.01	
4	Michelle Ford	Australia	2:05.72	
5	Susan Barnard	Great Britain	2:08.76	
6	María París	Costa Rica	2:13.17	
7	María Pérez	Venezuela	2:13.97	

=== Final ===
Rank	Athlete	Country	Time	Notes
1	Kornelia Ender	East Germany	1:59.26	WR
2	Shirley Babashoff	United States	2:01.22	
3	Enith Brigitha	Netherlands	2:01.40	
4	Annelies Maas	Netherlands	2:02.56	
5	Gail Amundrud	Canada	2:03.32	
6	Jennifer Hooker	United States	2:04.20	
7	Claudia Hempel	East Germany	2:04.61	
8	Irina Vlasova	Soviet Union	2:05.63	
