= Swimming at the 1975 World Aquatics Championships – Women's 100 metre freestyle =

Women's 100 metre freestyle at the 1975 FINA World Championships
- Dates: 22 July 1975 (heats); 22 July 1975 (final)
- Competitors: 29
- Winning time: 56.60 seconds

Medalists
gold medal	Kornelia Ender	East Germany
silver medal	Shirley Babashoff	United States
bronze medal	Enith Brigitha	Netherlands

The women's 100 metre freestyle event at the 1975 World Aquatics Championships took place 22 July.

== Results ==
=== Heats ===
Rank	Swimmer	Nation	Time	Notes
1	Kornelia Ender	East Germany	57.36	CR
2	Enith Brigitha	Netherlands	58.14	
3	Barbara Krause	East Germany	58.20	
4	Kathy Heddy	United States	58.59	
5	Shirley Babashoff	United States	58.81	
6	Anne Jardin	Canada	59.10	
7	Lyubov Kobzova	Soviet Union	59.12	
8	Becky Smith	Canada	59.19	
8	Jutta Weber	West Germany	59.19	
10	Rebecca Perrott	New Zealand	59.54	
11	Sonya Gray	Australia	59.70	
12	Guylaine Berger	France	59.85	
13	Drue Le Guier	Australia	1:00.03	
14	Annelies Maas	Netherlands	1:00.55	
15	Gudrun Beckmann	West Germany	1:00.72	
16	Eva Andersson	Sweden	1:00.77	
17	Debbie Hill	United Kingdom	1:01.07	
18	Lucy Burle	Brazil	1:01.72	
19	Rosemary Ribeiro	Brazil	1:01.91	
20	Diana Olsson	Sweden	1:02.08	
21	Susan Barnard	United Kingdom	1:02.14	
22	Yelena Makushkina	Soviet Union	1:02.48	
23	Clara Reyes	Colombia	1:02.65	
24	Catherine Recouvreur	France	1:02.76	
25	Georgina Osorio	Panama	1:04.23	
26	Lorgia Orejuela	Ecuador	1:04.38	
27	Liliana Arce	Peru	1:04.76	
28	Marcela Gomez	Colombia	1:07.35	
29	Alexandra Viteri	Ecuador	1:11.14	

=== Swim-off ===
Rank	Swimmer	Nation	Time	Notes
1	Jutta Weber	West Germany	58.46	
2	Becky Smith	Canada	58.88	

=== Final ===
Rank	Name	Nationality	Time	Notes
1st place, gold medalist(s)	Kornelia Ender	East Germany	56.60	CR
2nd place, silver medalist(s)	Shirley Babashoff	United States	57.81	
3rd place, bronze medalist(s)	Enith Brigitha	Netherlands	58.20	
4	Kathy Heddy	United States	58.21	
5	Barbara Krause	East Germany	58.22	
6	Jutta Weber	West Germany	58.33	
7	Anne Jardin	Canada	58.90	
8	Lyubov Kobzova	Soviet Union	59.70	
