= Swimming at the 1976 Summer Olympics – Women's 400 metre freestyle =

Women's 400 metre freestyle at the Games of the XXI Olympiad
- Venue: Montreal Olympic pool
- Date: 20 July 1976 (heats & final)
- Competitors: 34 from 22 nations
- Winning time: 4:09.89 WR

Medalists
1st place, gold medalist(s)		Petra Thümer	East Germany
2nd place, silver medalist(s)		Shirley Babashoff	United States
3rd place, bronze medalist(s)		Shannon Smith	Canada

The women's 400 metre freestyle event for the 1976 Summer Olympics was held in Montreal. The event took place on 20 July.

== Results ==
=== Heats ===
Heat 1

Rank	Athlete	Country	Time	Notes
1	Rebecca Perrott	New Zealand	4:15.71	Q, OR
2	Regina Jäger	East Germany	4:20.05	
3	Tracey Wickham	Australia	4:24.44	
4	Carine Verbauwen	Belgium	4:26.27	
5	María Pérez	Venezuela	4:38.93	
6	María París	Costa Rica	4:40.35	
7	Vilborg Sverrisdóttir	Iceland	4:48.28	

Heat 2

Rank	Athlete	Country	Time	Notes
1	Brenda Borgh	United States	4:17.20	Q
2	Wendy Quirk	Canada	4:19.69	
3	Wendy Lee	Canada	4:20.16	
4	Laura Bortolotti	Italy	4:29.71	
5	Antonia Real	Spain	4:30.37	
6	Fernanda Pérez	Colombia	4:45.73	
7	Karen Robertson	Hong Kong	5:03.90	

Heat 3

Rank	Athlete	Country	Time	Notes
1	Annelies Maas	Netherlands	4:17.16	Q
2	Kathy Heddy	United States	4:19.34	Q
3	Susan Barnard	Great Britain	4:30.05	
4	Maria Guimarães	Brazil	4:32.63	
5	Linda Faber	Netherlands	4:36.98	
6	Susana Coppo	Argentina	4:57.41	

Heat 4

Rank	Athlete	Country	Time	Notes
1	Shirley Babashoff	United States	4:16.07	Q
2	Shannon Smith	Canada	4:16.70	Q
3	Sabine Kahle	East Germany	4:19.34	Q
4	Irina Vlasova	Soviet Union	4:21.19	
5	Ratchaneewan Bulakul	Thailand	4:32.98	
6	Susan Edmondson	Great Britain	4:33.33	
7	Diana Hatler	Puerto Rico	4:49.73	

Heat 5

Rank	Athlete	Country	Time	Notes
1	Petra Thümer	East Germany	4:17.20	Q
2	Rosemary Milgate	Australia	4:21.20	
3	Jenny Turrall	Australia	4:21.33	
4	Allison Calder	New Zealand	4:23.64	
5	Eleonora Pandini	Italy	4:34.69	
6	Myriam Mizouni	Tunisia	4:43.11	
7	Georgina Osorio	Panama	4:49.80	

=== Final ===
Rank	Athlete	Country	Time	Notes
1	Petra Thümer	East Germany	4:09.89	WR
2	Shirley Babashoff	United States	4:10.46	
3	Shannon Smith	Canada	4:14.60	
4	Rebecca Perrott	New Zealand	4:14.76	
5	Kathy Heddy	United States	4:15.50	
6	Brenda Borgh	United States	4:17.43	
7	Annelies Maas	Netherlands	4:17.44	
8	Sabine Kahle	East Germany	4:20.42	
