= Swimming at the 1979 Pan American Games – Women's 800 metre freestyle =

Women's 800 metre freestyle at the 1979 Pan American Games
- Venue: Piscina Olimpica Del Escambron
- Dates: July 8 (preliminaries and finals)
- Competitors: from - nations

Medalists
Gold medal	Kim Linehan	United States
Silver medal	Jennifer Hooker	United States
Bronze medal	Barbara Shockey	Canada

The women's 800 metre freestyle competition of the swimming events at the 1979 Pan American Games took place on 8 July at the Piscina Olimpica Del Escambron. The last Pan American Games champion was Wendy Weinberg of US.

This race consisted of sixteen lengths of the pool, all in freestyle.

== Results ==
All times are in minutes and seconds.

KEY:	q	Fastest non-qualifiers	Q	Qualified	GR	Games record	NR	National record	PB	Personal best	SB	Seasonal best

=== Heats ===
The first round was held on July 8.

Rank	Name	Nationality	Time	Notes
1	Kim Linehan	United States	8:48.83	Q
2	Jennifer Hooker	United States	9:03.75	Q
3	Barbara Shockey	Canada	9:07.59	Q
4	Leslie Brafield	Canada	9:07.94	Q
5	Maria Perez	Venezuela	9:25.36	Q
6	Genevieve Hernandez	Puerto Rico	9:25.97	Q
7	Andrea Neumayer	Argentina	9:32.95	Q
8	Ana Anchieta	Brazil	9:33.67	Q
9	Virginia Andreatta	Brazil	9:33.95	
10	Veronica Espinosa	Mexico	9:39.60	
11	Georgina Osorio	Panama	9:40.15	NR
12	Monica Ramirez	Mexico	9:44.96	
13	Ana Hill	Puerto Rico	10:01.52	

=== Final ===
The final was held on July 8.

Rank	Name	Nationality	Time	Notes
1st place, gold medalist(s)	Kim Linehan	United States	8:39.82	NR, GR
2nd place, silver medalist(s)	Jennifer Hooker	United States	8:50.71	
3rd place, bronze medalist(s)	Barbara Shockey	Canada	8:54.82	
4	Leslie Brafield	Canada	9:10.14	
5	Maria Perez	Venezuela	9:13.59	NR
6	Andrea Neumayer	Argentina	9:13.93	
7	Ana Anchieta	Brazil	9:29.84	
8	Genevieve Hernandez	Puerto Rico	9:34.34	NR
