= The Last Gold =

2016 documentary film

The Last Gold is a 2016 film about American swimmers Shirley Babashoff, Kim Peyton, Jill Sterkel, and Wendy Boglioli winning the American women's gold medal in the 4 x 100 meter relay at the 1976 Olympic Games, defeating the East Germans.

Unexpectedly, the 1976 Montreal Women's Swim Team won only 1 gold of thirteen events, despite in former international meets being as dominant as the American Men's team who took 11 of 13 events in Montreal. The East German Women's team who, after the fall of communism and the reunification of East and West Germany, were found to have been taking steroid supplements to bulk up and improve their times won 11 of the 13 events, shutting out nearly every potential gold medal finish by the American women.

After their prior performances, the East German team of Kornelia Ender, Petra Thumer, Andrea Pollack and Claudia Hempel was heavily favored to win the 4 x 100 meter relay. All were later found to have been taking state-funded steroids. Prior to the event, American sportscaster and former Olympic medalist Donna de Varona, picked East Germany to win the event, but Kim Peyton, Wendy Boglioli and Jill Sterkel teamed with Babashoff to pull off a great upset as Babashoff outlegged Hempel down the stretch to win the gold medal and shatter the world record by 4 seconds. Babashoff, who won four silver medals in events where she was prevented from winning gold by East German women who had benefitted from the use of steroids, swam one of the most memorable events of her life in one of the most exciting relay events of the modern Olympics.

== Cast ==
- Shirley Babashoff
- Kim Peyton
- Jill Sterkel
- Wendy Boglioli
- Juliana Margulies
- John Naber
