= Casey Converse =

American swimmer and coach (1957–2024)

- Converse as Air Force Coach

Biographical details
- Born: September 12, 1957; Topeka, Kansas, U.S.
- Died: August 8, 2024 (aged 66); Colorado Springs, Colorado, U.S.
- Height: 6 ft 0 in (183 cm)
- Education: University of Alabama; Washburn University (1984)

Playing career
- 1975-: Mission Viejo Nadadores; Coached by Mark Schubert
- 1976-1980: University of Alabama; Coached by Don Gambril
- Positions: freestyle, distance

Coaching career (HC unless noted)
- Late 70's: Cincinnati Pepsi Marlins Club
- 1985-1988: New Mexico State University
- 1988-2017: Air Force Academy

Head coaching record
- Overall: 305-202-2 (Air Force Academy 1988-2017)

Accomplishments and honors

Championships
- 2xDivision II NCAA Championships (Air Force Women 1995-1996); 5 Conference Titles (Air Force Women 1989-96)

Awards
- Richard E. Steadman Award 2017; CSCAA 100 Greatest Coaches of the Century 2021; U.S. Air Force Academy Hall of Fame 2022

Records
- Most wins by an Air Force Coach (1988-2017)

Keith Cawthon "Casey" Converse (September 12, 1957 – August 8, 2024) was an American college swimming coach for the United States Airforce Academy in Colorado, Springs and a former competition swimmer. He was one of the United States' more outstanding distance swimmers during the 1970s, competing at the 1976 Summer Olympics and setting a pair of NCAA records while swimming for the Alabama Crimson Tide swim team at the University of Alabama, coached by Don Gambril.

== Early life and swimming ==
Keith "Casey" Converse was born on September 12, 1957, in Topeka, Kansas, to Dorothy Peterson Converse and Edward Brandly Converse, the youngest child with three older sisters. When the family moved to Alabama, Converse started riding his bicycle to swim at Alabama's Mobile Country Club Pool in the summer months. By 12, he swam summers at the Country Club Pool, but spent the indoor season training with Harold Lanier at the Chandler YMCA, for whom he credits his early training in stroke mechanics and his acquisition of a strong work ethic. Lanier had been a former swimmer for the University of Alabama, and would later coach Alabama's Women's Swim Team. A swimming family, Converse's three older sisters, Branely, Lilly and Dorie, all swam for the Country Club of Mobile, with Dorie becoming the 100-meter butterfly city champion.

Growing up in Mobile, Casey went to St. Paul's Episcopal School. While still representing the Chandler YMCA in the Mobile area, Converse first broke an age-group record for the 1,650-yard freestyle as a High School Sophomore with a time of 16:18.5 at the YMCA National Swimming and Diving Championships in Fort Lauderdale, Florida, bettering the old time by 38 seconds. The Club is now known as the City of Mobile Swim Association (CMSA). He left for California to train with the Mission Viejo Nadadores around the age of 17 half way through his Junior year in High School, in January, 1975 and graduated from Mission Viejo High School in 1976. With the Mission Viejo Nadadores, Converse ramped up his training to 16-17,000 meters a day, usually consisting of 2 two-hour practices with additional time spent weight training.

In his Senior year at Mission Viejo High, Converse continued to swim for the Mission Viejo Nadadores, the outstanding program coached by Hall of Fame Coach Mark Schubert. Representing the Nadadores, Converse won the 1,500-meter freestyle in a 1-2-3 sweep with Jesse Vassallo taking second, and Brian Goodell taking third at Philadelphia's AAU Senior Long Course Nationals in the fall of 1976. All three swimmers swam for the Mission Viejo Nadadores. Six of the U.S. 1976 U.S. Olympic Team swam for Mark Schubert's Nadadores team.

== University of Alabama swimmer ==
Alabama Swim Coach, Don Gambril

Converse set the NCAA record in the 1,000-yard freestyle during a dual meet at Auburn University in 1977. On March 26, 1977, he set an NCAA record and became the first man in swimming history to break the 15-minute barrier in the mile on his way to winning the 1,650-yard freestyle when he clocked an American and NCAA record time of 14:57.30 at the NCAA Championships in Cleveland, Ohio in his Freshman year at Alabama. His time beat the old record by nine seconds. Converse also set an NCAA record for the 100-yard freestyle.

Casey later graduated from Washburn University in Topeka, Kansas in 1984 with a degree in Education. He eventually completed a Masters from the University of Northern Colorado, in Greeley, Colorado.

== 1976 Montreal Olympics ==
Swimming for the Mission Viejo Nadadores, Converse qualified for the 1976 Olympics in the 400-meter freestyle with a time of 3:53.70, placing third at the trails in Long Beach, California on June 18, 1976. Brian Goodell placed first with a time of 3:53.08, breaking the former world record, and Tim Shaw placed second. In the 1,500-meter event, Converse finished fourth, and did not qualify in the event as only the first three finishers qualified for the U.S. team. Converse later told the press he was better suited to the endurance requirements of the 1,500 meter, and did not believe the 400-meter was his strongest event.

Swimming as an 18-year old, Converse swam as a member of the 1976 U.S. Olympic Team, placing ninth in the men's 400-meter freestyle, with a time of 4:00.65, notably slower than his Olympic trial qualifying time, though he was swimming a long and demanding event. Mission Viejo Nadadores teammate, American Brian Goodell swam a new world record time of 3:51.93 for the gold medal, with Time Shaw swimming a 3:52.54 for the silver. Bronze medalist Vladamir Raskatov of the Russian team swam well back with a 3:55.76. Goodell and Shaw set a blistering world record pace, and stayed together through the first 300 meters before Goodell finally opened up with a slight lead on the last lap, touching ahead of Shaw by only a half a body length.

== Coaching ==
=== Early coaching ===
After college graduation from Washburn University in Topeka, Kansas, and during his studies, Converse began coaching with a youth team. In the late 1970s, he became an assistant coach for the Cincinnati Pepsi Marlin Swim Team. In his first longer collegiate assignment, Converse coached swimming at New Mexico State University from 1985 to 1988 where he was considered a part-time head coach. He resigned New Mexico State when the college announced in July 1988 they would no longer be funding a swimming program for the 1988-89 season, and was replaced by Mark McFarland, the former assistant swim coach at New Mexico State.

=== Coaching Air Force Academy ===
He served as the head swimming coach at the Air Force Academy in Colorado Springs from 1988 to 2017, becoming the Academy's first civilian coach. From 1988 to 1996 he was the head coach for both the men's and women's teams, and coached the women's swim program exclusively from 1997 to 2017. During his full coaching tenure, the men's team went from last in the Western Athletic Conference to second, and the women became the first Air Force team to win two consecutive NCAA Division II championships in the 1995-1996 season. In 1997, when Converse shifted his focus to the women's team, they changed from DII to NCAA Division I, affecting their overall record, and increasing his challenges as a coach. From 1989 to 1996, Converse's women's program at Air Force achieved a record of 73-21, winning five conference titles. The women's team gained an NCAA Division I ranking in 1997. By 2016, Converse had coached eight of his swimmers to the Olympic trials. His overall record at Air Force, in his 29 years of coaching was 305-202-2, and he retired from coaching Air Force in 2017 as the winningest coach in the Academy's history. Converse earned honors five times as Coach of the Year at both the Collegiate Conference level and with Division II of the National Collegiate and Athletic Association (NCAA). He mentored 32 of his swimmers to honors as All-Americans on 178 occasions.

He was the author of Munich to Montreal: Olympic Swimming in a Tarnished Golden Era, a book that explores the East German doping scandal in 1970 women's swimming, and the American women who fought against it. While writing, Converse worked as a consultant for The Last Gold, a documentary produced by USA Swimming to tell the same story.

=== Honors ===
In 2021, he was selected as one of the top 100 college swim coaches in the last 100 years by the CSCAA (the College Swimming & Diving Coaches Association of America). Converse was also awarded the 2017 Richard E. Steadman Award by the CSCAA, given to those in coaching who spread happiness in the sport. Converse was inducted into the University of Alabama Swimming Hall of Fame, and the Mobile, Alabama Sports Hall of Fame, as the first swimmer in 2014.

Recognizing his groundbreaking career achievements including bringing the school to its first national swimming championship, Converse was elected to the U.S. Air Force Academy Hall of Fame in 2022.

He died from cancer in Colorado Springs, Colorado, on August 8, 2024, at the age of 66, and was survived by his wife Andrea, his first wife Sherry, married daughters Rosie and Maggie, and grandchildren. He spent part of his retirement at a residence in Maui, Hawaii. His hobbies included fly fishing, dancing, and bicycling. A memorial service was held at Shrove Chapel in Colorado Springs on September 20, 2024.

== Sources ==
1. The 2011 University of Alabama Swimming and Diving Media Guide
2. The 2010 Air Force Academy Athletics Website
3. Swimming World Magazine
