= Michael Brinegar =

American open water swimmer

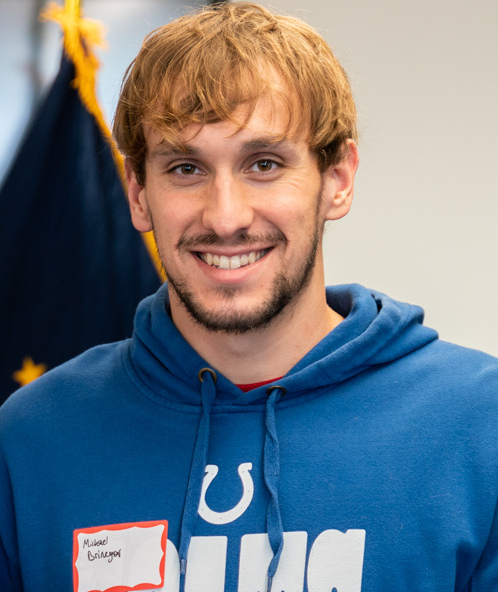

Personal information
- Nationality: American
- Born: September 15, 1999 (age 26) Bloomington, Indiana, U.S.
- Height: 6 ft 4 in (193 cm)
- Weight: 175 lb (79 kg)

Sport
- Country: United States
- Sport: Open water swimming
- Event(s): 5 km, 800m, 1500m
- College team: Indiana University
- Club: Donner Swim Club (Columbus, IN); Mission Viejo Nadadores
- Coached by: Mark Schubert; Mission Viejo, Ray Looze; Indiana University
Medal record
Representing United States
World Championships
Bronze medal – third place	2019 Gwangju	Team event
World Junior Championships
Silver medal – second place	2017 Indianapolis	1500 m freestyle
Bronze medal – third place	2017 Indianapolis	800 m freestyle

Michael Brinegar (born September 15, 1999) is an American swimmer specializing in distance freestyle and open water swimming who swam for Indiana University and competed in the 2020 Tokyo Olympics in the 800 and 1500-meter freestyle events.

== Early life ==
On September 15, 1999, in Bloomington, Indiana, Michael was born to swimming Olympian Jennifer Hooker and Jamie Brinegar, a former All New England track and field athlete at Yale . His mother Jennifer was a competitive distance freestyler who would swim for Indiana as would Michael. Jennifer participated at the 1976 Olympics in the 200 freestyle and the 4x100-meter freestyle relay. Michael's mother worked as an Assistant athletic director at Indiana in Bloomington, and his father Jamie worked as a business manager for Columbus Parks and Recreation.

Beginning to swim at age 5, by 9 Michael was competing at the Donner Swim Club in Columbus, Indiana regularly, where he would soon be coached by his mother Jennifer. By 12, he had decided to focus on swimming as his only sport. Michael would attend Columbus Northside Middle School, and later Columbus North High School where he was coached by swim coach Jim Sheridan, who had been an Assistant under Hall of Fame Coach Mark Schubert. At Columbus North, he would earn High School All America honors. In March, 2012, Michael won the 200 and 500 freestyle in age group competition for 11-12 year olds at the Indiana State Championships. At Donner Swim Club, at 12 he set every club record but the 100 freestyle.

== Career ==
=== Junior ===
In 2015, he was the Indiana State Champion in the 500-yard freestyle. In the 2017 Junior World Championships, he took a bronze in the 800 meter freestyle and a silver in the 1500 meter freestyle with a personal best time of 15.09.

More significantly, he participated at the 2019 World Aquatics Championships, winning a bronze medal anchoring the mixed 5 km team relay. Competing at Gwangju, South Korea, at 19 he nearly caught up with the German first-place finisher and the Italian second-place finisher in a photo finish.

=== Swimming for Indiana University Bloomington ===
Michael attended Indiana University Bloomington, where he competed for the Indiana Hoosiers swimming and diving team under Head Coach Ray Looze beginning in the 2018–19 season. After the close of his freshman year in the spring of 2019 he chose to redshirt the following year and elected to train in California with the Mission Viejo Nadadores under Hall of Fame Coach Mark Schubert, as had his mother after her Olympic competition in 1976 . He returned to Bloomington for his Sophomore year at Indiana, in the fall of 2020.

At the NCAA Men's Division I Swimming and Diving Championships during his freshman year, he placed second at the NCAA Championship in the 1,650 yard freestyle (14:27.50). At the NCAA Championships in 2021, Brinegar earned All-American honors with a 10th-place finish in the 1,650 (14:45.50). Brinegar placed sixth at the 2022 NCAA Championships in the 1,650-yard freestyle (mile). Though he placed 40th in the 500 free, Brinegar finished the meet much stronger, swimming 14:33.76 for the mile.

During his years at Indiana, the swim team won two Big Ten team titles and had three Top 6 NCAA Team finishes.

=== Senior ===
Held in 2021, due to COVID, Brinegar placed second in the 800m and 1500m freestyles at the 2020 US Olympic Team Trials for the Tokyo 2020 Olympic Games and therefore qualified for the US team. He clocked a personal best of 7:49.94 in the 800m and again placed second behind Finke with a time of 15:00.87.

In the Tokyo games, he competed in the 800 and 1500 freestyle, placing seventeenth in both events with times of 800 free in 7:53.00 and the 1500 free in 15:04.67.

In 2023, he decided to train for the 2024 Paris Olympics with Hall of Fame Coach Mark Schubert as he had at age 15, and after his Freshman year at Indiana. His mother Jennifer had also moved to Mission Viejo, California, and trained with Schubert after her participation in the 1976 Olympics.

In 2024, Michael Brinegar has been handed a four-year ban for blood doping by the United States Anti-Doping Agency (USADA). He commented that “As an Olympian and son of an Olympic swimmer whose U.S. Women's team faced an East German team that was systematically doping, cheating is a betrayal of everything I have been taught and stand for. I am deeply disappointed by the Court of Arbitration for Sport's (CAS) ruling and USADA’s accusations that are utterly unfounded." Brinegar publicly disputed the reasoning of the CAS decision.
