= Kamstra =

Kamstra is a Dutch surname. Notable people with the surname include:

- Berber Kamstra (born 1960), Dutch swimmer
- Brian Kamstra (born 1993), Dutch cyclist
- Joop Kamstra (1905–1957), Dutch athlete
- Petra Kamstra (born 1974), Dutch tennis player
