= Wendy Lee =

Wendy Lee may refer to:

- Wendee Lee (born 1960), American voice actress and director
- Wendy Lee (swimmer) (born 1960), Canadian swimmer
- Wendy J.N. Lee American filmmaker

== See also ==
- Wendy Lee Gramm, American economist, born Wendy Lee
