= Ylva Persson =

Swedish swimmer

Personal information
- Born: 30 March 1960 (age 66) Stockholm, Sweden

Sport
- Sport: Swimming

Ylva Persson (born 30 March 1960) is a Swedish former freestyle swimmer. She competed in two events at the 1976 Summer Olympics.
