= Jennifer Hooker =

American swimmer

- Jennifer Hooker around 17, circa 1978

Personal information
- Full name: Jennifer Leigh Hooker
- National team: United States
- Born: June 6, 1961 (age 65) Bloomington, Indiana
- Height: 5 ft 9 in (1.75 m)
- Weight: 126 lb (57 kg)
- Spouse: Jamie Brinegar

Sport
- Sport: Swimming
- Strokes: Freestyle
- Club: Bloomington Swim Club; Louisville Tarpons; Mission Viejo Nadadores
- College team: Indiana University
- Coach: Doc Counsilman (Bloomington Swim Club); Mark Schubert (Mission Viejo Nadadores)

Jennifer Leigh Hooker (born June 6, 1961), also known by her married name Jennifer Brinegar, is an American former competition swimmer who represented the United States at only 15 at the 1976 Summer Olympics in Montreal, Quebec. She swam for Indiana University where she received a business degree in 1984, and later practiced law after receiving a Juris Doctor degree from Vanderbilt University. After receiving a Master's in Sports Management in 1996 at Indiana University, she worked for their athletic department, becoming an assistant athletic director in 1999.

== Early swimming ==
Hooker was born in Bloomington, Indiana on June 6, 1961, to Jack Hooker, a Bloomington-area construction company executive, and Jeanne Hooker, a kindergarten teacher. She began swimming at 8, though she started more serious competition a few years later with the Bloomington Gatorade Swim Club under Coach Doc Counsilman. By 12, she held two Indiana age group records: a 5:30.7 in the 500-yard freestyle, and a 2:02.5 in the 200-yard freestyle.

Still in her early teenage years, she had received technique tips from Hall of Fame Coach Doc Counsilman of Indiana University and trained at times with the outstanding Indiana men's swimming team from the ages of 12–14. Additional technique tips were provided by Cincinnati Marlins Coach, Olympian Charlie Hickcox, and her Bloomington Swim Club coach Gary Conolly. Later, Jennifer set meet and state records in the 500-yard freestyle of 4:57.7, and the 200-yard freestyle of 1:53.4, at the Midwest Conference Senior Championships in February 1976, at Lakeside Swim Club in Louisville. She set two additional meet and Kentucky state records at the Midwestern Conference Championships, a 17:03.18 in the 1,650-yard swim and a 53.4 in the 100-yard freestyle.

== Training for the Olympics ==
Seeking more intensive training in preparation for the 1976 Olympic Trials, she took a break from the Bloomington Swim Club and moved to Louisville from Bloomington, attending Louisville's Waggener High School, and swam for the Louisville Tarpons swim club under Coach Terry Schlichenmaier. She qualified for the Olympics at the trials in Long Beach, as did her 25-year-old Tarpons teammate Camille Wright, a champion butterfly swimmer.

By July 1976, she was training for the Olympics with the U.S. Olympic team at West Point in New York, averaging two two-hour workouts per day. The Olympic Head Coach for the 1976 Women's team was Jack Nelson who worked closely with Hooker, as did the Olympic Women's Assistant Coach Jim Montrella. After the Olympics, she returned to Bloomington and attended Bloomington South High School. She worked out with the Bloomington South High School Boys swimming team, but did not find them competitive enough for a swimmer of her ability.

== 1976 Olympics ==
At only 15, she competed in the women's 200-meter freestyle, and finished sixth in the final with a time of 2:04.20. She also swam for the gold medal-winning U.S. team in the preliminary heats of the women's 4×100-meter freestyle relay, but did not receive a medal. Under the Olympic swimming rules in effect in 1976, only those relay swimmers who competed in the event final were medal-eligible.

Showing her skills in mid-August after the Olympics, at the Kentucky State AAU Swim meet at the Plantation Swim Club in Louisville, she won the 200 freestyle, 100 butterfly and 200 backstroke, and took second place in the 400 individual medley relay team.

Travelling with the U.S. Olympic team, she visited Leningrad, Moscow, and New Zealand and attended meets in East Germany.

== Move to Mission Viejo, California ==
Not long after the 1976 Olympics, seeking training commensurate with her abilities, for her sophomore year in high school she moved to Mission Viejo, California, at the advice of her Bloomington Swim Club Coach Doc Counsilman. There she trained with the Mission Viejo Nadadores under Hall of Fame Coach Mark Schubert. She attended Mission Viejo High School and swam with their top-ranked girls swim team, helping them capture the CIF 4-A title in 1977. As a world-ranked female swimming competitor, she trained around two and a half hours twice a day, swimming as many as 20,000 meters total, and did an hour of strength training a few days a week. In 1976, after joining the Nadadores, she captured titles in the 500 and 1650 freestyle events in Canton, Ohio, setting new American records in both events.

Hooker was a two-time national champion in 1977 and was world ranked in 1977, 1978 and 1979. On July 8, 1979, she won a silver medal in the San Juan, Puerto Rico Pan American games in the 800-meter freestyle with a time of 8:50.71.3, taking a second to Kim Linehan. In 1978, she won a gold at the World Aquatics Championships in the 4x100-meter freestyle relay, though she swam only in the preliminary heats.

At the AAU Long Course Championships on August 4, 1978, she was part of the Mission Viejo Nadadores team that set a new American record in the Women's 4x200-meter freestyle relay with a time of 8:21.40 at the Woodlands, outside Houston, Texas.

== Indiana University ==
She attended Indiana University in Bloomington, Indiana, where she began swimming competitively in the fall of 1980, receiving a business degree in 1984. During her swimming career at Indiana, she won seven Big Ten championships, and won national titles in the 500- and 1,650-yard freestyle events.

Hooker served as captain of Indiana's Big Ten Championship team in 1981. Excelling in distance events, she won championships in the Big Ten in the 200-, 500- and 1650-yard freestyle events in 1980 and 1981 and the 1650-yard freestyle in 1982. She made All-American in three events in 1980 and 1981, and at the 1980 AIAW National Championships was second and fifth in the 500 and 1650 freestyle.

== Professional life ==
After completing college, Hooker became an auto industry professional, first selling General Motors automobiles in Rantoul, Illinois and later working as an insurance and finance manager in Americus, Georgia. She obtained a degree in law from Vanderbilt University, later practicing law in St. Louis and Rochester, Minnesota. Jennifer married James Brinegar in 1999. James Brinegar was a track athlete at Yale University who later did triathlons. Hooker resettled in Bloomington in 1994 to work for the IU Department of Athletics, and in 1996 completed a master's degree in sports management. Initially a graduate assistant in the athletic department, she was promoted to assistant athletic director in 1999, and directed the compliance office.

In 2008, she moved her family to Columbus, from Bloomington, Indiana so her son Michael could swim and compete with the Donner Swim Club and Columbus North High School. Her son Kevin also swam with the Donner Club.

=== Swim coaching ===
Around 2010 she did some swim coaching primarily for children under 12 as a volunteer assistant for the Donner Swim Club in Columbus, and in 2015 was named the Indiana Swimming Developmental Coach of the Year. One of the swimmers was her son Michael. Around 2015, as a freshman at Indiana's Columbus North High School, Michael won the state title in the 500 freestyle event. Like Jennifer, Michael moved to California and trained with Mark Schubert as a high school upperclassman. Continuing to coach through 2023 at Donner Aquatic Center in Columbus, she was named by the American Swimming Coaching Association as a Top 50 U.S. Age Group Coach in June 2023 for founding and coaching Donner Aquatic's Club Olympia Swim Team. The team was rated 56th nationally and second in Indiana. Club Olympia trains year-round, splitting its time between Donner Aquatic Center in the summer months and two local Columbus-area high schools with indoor pools in the winter.

Hooker's son Michael Brinegar became an NCAA All American swimmer for Indiana, competed in the 2020 Olympic games in the 800 and 1500 freestyle, turned professional in 2022, and decided to train for the 2024 Paris Olympics.

== Honors ==
She was inducted into the Indiana University Athletic Hall of Fame in 1999. She received the Leanne Grotke Award in 2013, given by Indiana University to a living person whose service has made exceptional contributions to the IU women's athletics program. Jennifer was also a 2011 inductee into the Monroe County Sports Hall of Fame.

== See also ==
- List of Indiana University (Bloomington) people
