= Shirley Babashoff =

American swimmer

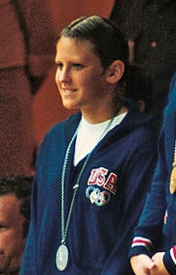
- Babashoff on the podium at 1972 Olympics

Personal information
- Full name: Shirley Frances Babashoff
- National team: United States
- Born: January 31, 1957 (age 69) Whittier, California, U.S.
- Height: 5 ft 10 in (1.78 m)
- Weight: 148 lb (67 kg)

Sport
- Sport: Swimming
- Strokes: Freestyle
- Club: Mission Viejo Nadadores
- Coach: Mark Schubert; Nadadores
Medal record
Women's swimming
Representing the United States
Event	1st	2nd	3rd
Olympic Games	3	6	0
World Championships	2	7	1
Total	5	13	1
Olympic Games
Gold medal – first place	1972 Munich	4×100 m medley
Gold medal – first place	1972 Munich	4×100 m freestyle
Gold medal – first place	1976 Montreal	4×100 m freestyle
Silver medal – second place	1972 Munich	100 m freestyle
Silver medal – second place	1972 Munich	200 m freestyle
Silver medal – second place	1976 Montreal	200 m freestyle
Silver medal – second place	1976 Montreal	400 m freestyle
Silver medal – second place	1976 Montreal	800 m freestyle
Silver medal – second place	1976 Montreal	4×100 m medley
World Championships
Gold medal – first place	1975 Cali	200 m freestyle
Gold medal – first place	1975 Cali	400 m freestyle
Silver medal – second place	1973 Belgrade	100 m freestyle
Silver medal – second place	1973 Belgrade	200 m freestyle
Silver medal – second place	1973 Belgrade	4×100 m freestyle
Silver medal – second place	1973 Belgrade	4×100 m medley
Silver medal – second place	1975 Cali	4×100 m freestyle
Silver medal – second place	1975 Cali	4×100 m medley
Silver medal – second place	1975 Cali	100 m freestyle
Bronze medal – third place	1975 Cali	800 m freestyle

Shirley Frances Babashoff (born January 31, 1957) is an American former competition swimmer, Olympic champion, and former world record-holder in multiple events. Babashoff set six world records and earned a total of nine Olympic medals in her career. She won a gold medal in the 400-meter freestyle relay in both the 1972 and 1976 Olympics, and she won the 1975 world championship in both the 200-meter and 400-meter freestyle. During her career, she set 37 national records (17 individual and 20 relay) and for some time held all national freestyle records from the 100-meter to 800-meter events.

== Early swimming career ==
After trying private lessons, Shirley began taking swimming lessons around the age of eight at Cerritos College, a junior college in Los Angeles County's Norwalk, California, as did her brother Jack Babashoff, who would also become an Olympic swimmer in 1976. At nine, Shirley swam for the Buena Park Splashers with her brother Jack, later swimming for a club in El Monte, California coached by Don La Mont, a talented coach.

Beginning around the age of 13 in 1970, Shirley swam at Golden West College in Huntington Beach for a company-sponsored team, Phillips 66, under coach Ralph "Flip" Darr through her junior year in high school. Darr coached swimmers who swam in four separate Olympics. Shirley attended meets from an early age, and under Darr, she began to set age group records.

=== Swimming with the Nadadores ===
After Flip Darr resigned from coaching during her junior year in high school, Shirley began swimming for the Mission Viejo Nadadores, one of America's top swimming programs coached by Hall of Fame Coach Mark Schubert. Shirley excelled under Schubert's long and challenging workouts, which included a focus on improving her fly, back, and breaststroke skills, and included managed weight training. By the 1972 Olympics, Shirley was one of the top women freestylers in the country. She continued to work with the Nadadores and Schubert as her primary source of training until the 1976 Olympics, and led the team to win the AAU Short Course Championships in April, 1975.

== 1972 Summer Olympics ==
At the 1972 Summer Olympics in Munich, she won golds in the 4x100-meter freestyle and medley relay and silver medals in the 100-meter and 200-meter individual freestyle events. In the 400-meter freestyle, finishing fourth behind East German competitor Gudrun Wegner, Shirley missed taking a bronze medal by only .48 seconds.

In September 1974, Shirley led the American women's team to a win over the East German women in a dual meet in Concord, California. She tied her own world record in the 200-meter freestyle at 2:02.94, won the 400-meter freestyle, and anchored a 4x100-meter freestyle relay that set a world record. The American women's team was coached by Shirley's former coach, Ralph Darr.

== 1976 Summer Olympics ==
At the 1976 U.S. Olympic Trials, she won all the freestyle events, as well as the 400-meter individual medley, setting one world and six national records in the process. Her performance was considered one of the greatest achievements by any woman at an Olympic trial.

At the 1976 Summer Olympics in Montreal, Quebec, she won four silver medals and a gold medal in the 4×100-meter freestyle relay in world record time, despite the competition being dominated by East German swimmers. The four silver medals came in the 200-meter, 400-meter and 800-meter freestyle, and the 4×100-meter medley relay. Although Babashoff never won an individual gold medal in Olympic competition, she is still regarded as one of the top swimmers in history, and is most vividly remembered for having swum the anchor leg on the gold-medal-winning 4×100-meter freestyle relay team, in its victory over the doped up, steroid-plagued 1976 East German women, in what is widely acknowledged as one of the single most memorable races in the entire history of women's swimming.

The East German team of Kornelia Ender, Petra Thumer, Andrea Pollack and Claudia Hempel was heavily favored to win the race. Prior to the relay, American sportscaster Donna de Varona picked East Germany to win the event, but Kim Peyton, Wendy Boglioli and Jill Sterkel teamed with Babashoff to upset the East Germans, breaking the world record by 4 seconds. After the event, de Varona said, "I have never been happier to eat my words in the prediction I made right before this event." Shirley Babashoff's time in winning the silver medal in the 400-meter freestyle at the 1976 Olympics would have defeated men's gold medalist Don Schollander twelve years earlier at the 1964 Olympics in Tokyo.

== Personal life ==
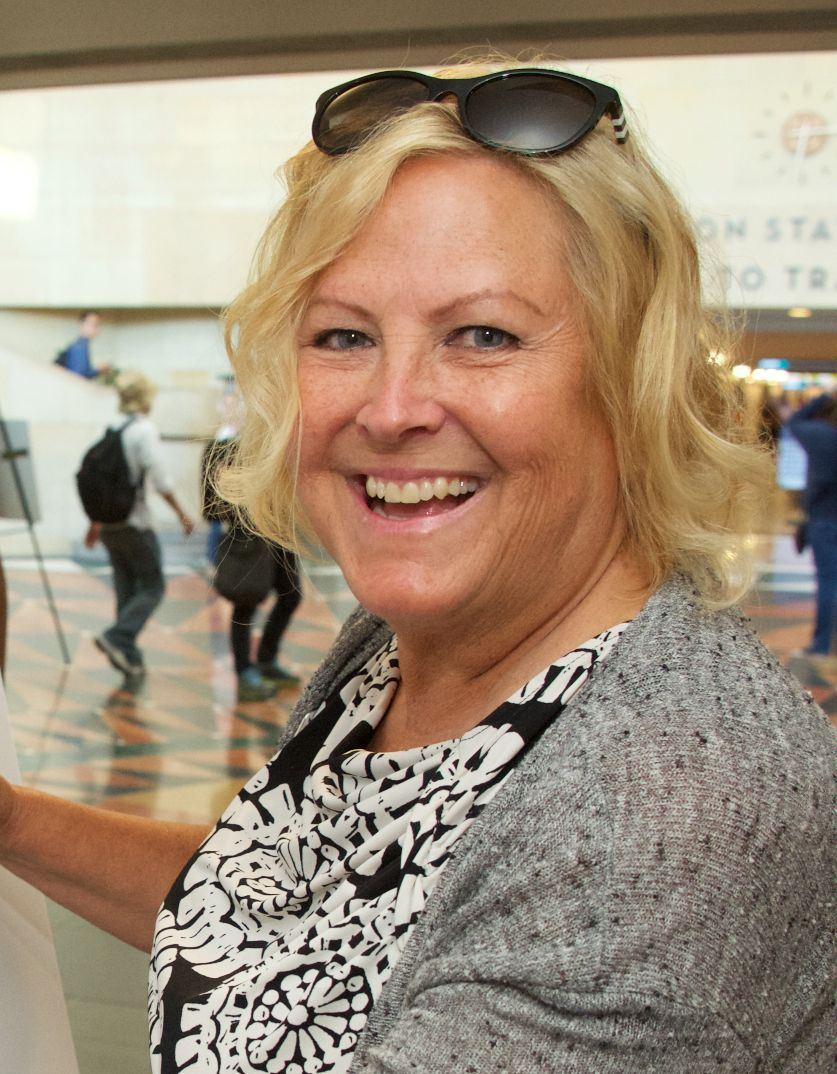
Babashoff in 2016

Babashoff was one of four children of Jack Babashoff, a machinist, and Vera Slivkoff, a housewife. Her father had been a swimming instructor in Hawaii and always wanted his own children to become Olympians. Both of her parents are second-generation Spiritual Christians from Russia.

=== Shirley's doping accusations confirmed ===
After the 1976 Olympics, Babashoff was occasionally referred to as "Surly Shirley" and described as a "sore loser" by the media because of her public accusations of drug cheating by the East German swimmers. She was later proven correct: most East German athletes were using performance-enhancing drugs, substantiated by investigators in the PBS documentary, "Secrets of the Dead: Doping for Gold." By 1991, after the fall of communism and German reunification, several media reports vindicated Shirley's accusations of doping, including the widely circulated New York Times, that featured the headlines, "Coaches Confirm That Steroids Fueled East Germany's Success in Swimming". Most of the East German women's team were listed in the article. It is estimated that Babashoff was denied three gold medals as a result of cheating by East Germany.

In the mid- to late-90's, when German news agencies released more detailed information confirming that the former East Germany had a state-run doping program for their 1976 women's swimming team and other athletes, the American Olympic committee considered giving "upgrade medals" to Americans who had lost to East German athletes confirmed of taking banned substances. However, Jacques Rogge, an IOC committee member from Belgium and future IOC president, disapproved of the idea as he felt too much time had passed to make the change. The 1976 American Olympic 4x100-meter women's medley relay team, in which Shirley had participated in Montreal and taken a silver, were given "appropriate medal recognition", however. No medal reallocations took place, and East German athletes are still listed as the winners.

=== Life after swimming ===
After the Montreal Olympics, and the end of her competitive swimming career, in the autumn of 1976 she enrolled at UCLA, majoring in business. She left the school after a few years, did not swim with the team, and retired from swimming in January 1977. She had an endorsement contract with swimsuit company Arena from 1977 through around 1980, which required her to work as a representative 56 days a year. She did a few television appearances. Babashoff then worked coaching swimming primarily around Los Angeles, and for a period in Korea, coaching the Korean Women's National Swim Team in Pyongyang for the 1988 Olympics.

In 1978, Babashoff agreed to a marriage arranged by her father with a rural Kern County star athlete, whose family also descended from Spiritual Christians from Russia and were conservative Dukh-i-zhizniki. Her father intended to breed superior athletes, but they divorced two years later. She never remarried.

In 1982, she was inducted into the International Swimming Hall of Fame as an "Honor Swimmer," and became a member of the U.S. Olympic Hall of Fame in 1987. She had a son in 1986 whom she raised alone, and became a letter carrier for the United States Postal Service in Orange County, California in the Huntington Beach Area.

On April 30, 2005, Babashoff received the Olympic Order, the highest award of the Olympic Movement, during the Inaugural Olympic Assembly luncheon. International Olympic Committee members Bob Ctvrtlik, Anita DeFrantz, and Jim Easton presented the award. The IOC established the Olympic Order in 1974 to honor individuals who have illustrated the Olympic Ideals through their actions, have achieved remarkable merit in the sporting world, or have rendered outstanding services to the Olympic cause, either through their own personal achievements or their contributions to the development of sport.

Her brother Jack Babashoff won the silver medal behind teammate Jim Montgomery in the 100-meter freestyle at the 1976 Montreal Olympics. Her other brother Bill and sister Debbie were also swimmers who competed internationally.

Shirley attended Fountain Valley High School in Fountain Valley, California where she graduated in 1974. In 1973 she led the school to their first-ever California Interscholastic Federation Championship in girls' swimming.

== See also ==
- List of multiple Olympic medalists at a single Games
- List of multiple Summer Olympic medalists
- List of Olympic medalists in swimming (women)
- List of University of California, Los Angeles people
- List of World Aquatics Championships medalists in swimming (women)
- World record progression 200 metres freestyle
- World record progression 400 metres freestyle
- World record progression 800 metres freestyle
- World record progression 4 × 100 metres freestyle relay
- The Last Gold, A Review of the film about Shirley's 4x100 meter gold-winning event

== Bibliography ==
- De George, Matthew, Pooling Talent: Swimming's Greatest Teams, Rowman & Littlefield, Lanham, Maryland (2014). ISBN 978-1-4422-3701-8.
- Epting, Chris; Babashoff, Shirley (2016). Making Waves: My Journey to Winning Olympic Gold and Defeating the East German Doping Program. Santa Monica Press. ISBN 978-1595800879.

Olympic Games
Preceded by	Most career Olympic medals won by an American woman – 2000	Succeeded by Jenny Thompson
