= Wendy Boglioli =

American swimmer (born 1955)

- Boglioli, at post-Olympic press conference in July, 1976, at Monmouth College, West Long Branch NJ

Personal information
- Full name: Wendy Lou Lansbach Boglioli
- National team: United States
- Born: March 6, 1955 (age 71) Merrill, Wisconsin, U.S.
- Height: 5 ft 11 in (1.80 m)
- Weight: 141 lb (64 kg)
- Spouse: Bernie Boglioli

Sport
- Sport: Swimming
- Strokes: Freestyle, Butterfly
- Club: Central Jersey Aquatic Club
- College team: Monmouth College
- Coach: Dick Steadman (Monmouth); Bill Palmer (Central Jersey Aquatic Club)
Medal record
Women's swimming
Representing the United States
Olympic Games
Gold medal – first place	1976 Montreal	4x100 m freestyle
Bronze medal – third place	1976 Montreal	100 m butterfly

Wendy Boglioli, formerly Wendy Lansbach, (born March 6, 1955) is an American former swimmer, Olympic champion, and former world record-holder. After retiring from competitive swimming, she became a coach, and later, a motivational speaker.

== Early swimming and education ==
Lansbach was born on March 6, 1955 in Merrill, Wisconsin to Mary Ellen and Eber Lansbach and after moving 80 miles North, started swimming at the local YMCA in Land O' Lakes, Wisconsin, where she grew up competing regularly in swim competitions. Some of her earliest swimming took place at the Gateway Hotel Pool in Land O' Lakes, where Mary swam morning and night. The Gateway Hotel pool was only 18 yards, but since the next closest full-size pool was 80 miles away Mary became a regular. She attended Wisconsin's Eagle River High School, but as the school had no swim team, her swim training continued with the YMCA, where she was a National Champion by her High School Senior Year. In 1972, Mary qualified for the U.S. Olympic Trials in Chicago, where she placed 14th in the 100-yard butterfly.

== Monmouth College and Central Jersey Aquatic ==
In 1973, she was offered one of America's earliest women's swimming scholarships to Monmouth College by the college's swim coach Dick Steadmen. She attended Monmouth from 1973-1976, majoring in speech and drama. Much of her intensive swim training occurred with the Central Jersey Aquatic Club, formerly known as the Shore Swim Club, in Monmouth County, New Jersey, near Monmouth College, under Head Coach Bill Palmer, who started the club and coached it through 1988. At her peak training period, Wendy was swimming up to 20,000 meters a day or around 12.4 miles. The assistant coach at Central Jersey Aquatic Club for a period, was her future husband, Bernie Boglioli.

As a Monmouth Senior in 1976, she won the AIAW 100 butterfly with a U.S. National Record time of 55.6, becoming the first National Record time set by an AIAW athlete. She swam a meet record 52.12 100-yard freestyle at the same 1976 AIAW National Championships. She also set a meet record 200 free relay time, swimming with her younger sister Laurie. At the New Jersey American Athletic Union Championships in February 1976, Wendy won three events, twice beating World Champion and Central New Jersey Club teammate Kathy Heddy. At the AAU Region I meet in Princeton, New Jersey, she swam a 56.7 for the 100-yard butterfly, and a 1:51.3 for the 200-yard freestyle again beating Central Jersey Swim Club teammate Kathy Heddy.

In August 1975, during college summer break, and prior to her Olympic recognition, Wendy married Bernie Boglioli. After qualifying for the 1976 Olympic trials, Wendy would become the first married woman to make a U.S. Olympic swim, though she was only 21. Wendy's younger sister Laurie would later swim for Monmouth, and would earn a gold medal in the 1983 Pan American games.

== 1976 Montréal Olympics ==
Boglioli in July 1976, after Olympics

Her singularly most publicized accomplishment in swimming was winning the gold medal in the women's 4×100-meter freestyle relay in world record time at the 1976 Montréal Olympics with teammates Shirley Babashoff, Kim Peyton and Jill Sterkel. The gold was particularly crucial to the U.S. women's team as it was the only gold medal awarded to them during the games. Wendy's teammate at Central Jersey Aquatic Club, Kathy Heddy, was also on the 1976 Women's Olympic Team.

Boglioli also won the bronze medal in the women's 100-meter butterfly, behind East German swimmers Kornelia Ender and Andrea Pollack. During the 1990s, it was confirmed that Ender and Pollack were given performance-enhancing drugs during the East German doping scandal of the 1970s. Therefore, it is speculated Boglioli would have been in line for a gold or silver medal, were it not for the presence of Ender or Pollack.

== Honors ==
In 2004, she was honored as a Distinguished Alumna of Monmouth University. In 2007, she was inducted into Monmouth University's Sports Hall of Fame.

== Life after the Olympics ==
Wendy began training again in 1980 for the Olympics, before President Carter ordered a boycott of the Moscow games. After college graduation, Wendy briefly coached her club team, Central New Jersey Aquatics. Around 1980-81, she served as assistant coach of the Yale Bulldogs swimming and diving team at Yale University for a year, together with her husband Bernie Boglioli. She served as a member of the Olympic Committee, was a fund raiser for the 1984 games, and served on the Governor's Board on Physical Fitness. She worked briefly as a representative for Johnson's Wax.

In 1979, the Supersisters trading card set was produced and distributed; one of the cards featured Boglioli's name and picture.

Boglioli began competitive track cycling at the age of 40. She competed in the 1995 and 1996 U.S. Masters Track Cycling National Championship where she earned a total of 8 Gold Medals.(USA Masters Track Cycling, USCF). She also competed in the Senior National Track Championships in Colorado Springs, Colorado in 1996.(USCF)

In 1997, she entered the long-term care insurance field, and served as national spokeswoman for Genworth Financial's Long Term Care Division. Her trademarked In the Arms of Women initiative was the first of its kind in the industry to recognize the distinctive needs of women clients.

In 2008, she appeared in a BBC-produced documentary (airing on PBS) titled Doping for Gold, which later was nominated for an Emmy Award in the Documentary category. She is featured in a 2016 documentary titled The Last Gold which shows her and her teammates in 1976 at the Montreal Olympics.

Together with her husband of 40 years, she mainly resides in Hood River, Oregon, and has three children and three grandchildren. She continues her travels throughout the country giving motivational speeches to both corporations and social groups entitled "Finding the Champion Within". Her trademarked presentations "Physically Strong and Financially Sound" are also presented throughout the country to consumers and financial professionals. She also works with triathletes in the pool on a one on one basis.

== See also ==
- List of Monmouth University alumni
- List of Olympic medalists in swimming (women)
- World record progression 4 × 100 metres freestyle relay

== Bibliography ==
- De George, Matthew, Pooling Talent: Swimming's Greatest Teams, Rowman & Littlefield, Lanham, Maryland (2014). ISBN 978-1-4422-3701-8.
