= Caroline Carpentier =

French swimmer (born 1958)

Personal information
- Nationality: French
- Born: 9 September 1958 (age 67)

Sport
- Sport: Swimming
Medal record
Representing France
Mediterranean Games
Gold medal – first place	1975 Algiers	100m freestyle

Caroline Carpentier (born 9 September 1958) is a French former swimmer. She competed in the women's 4 × 100 metre freestyle relay at the 1976 Summer Olympics.
