= Laura Bortolotti =

Italian swimmer (born 1960)

Personal information
- Born: 11 April 1960 (age 66) Castello d'Argile, Italy

Sport
- Sport: Swimming

Laura Bortolotti (born 11 April 1960) is an Italian former freestyle swimmer. She competed in two events at the 1976 Summer Olympics.
