= Becky Wiber =

Canadian swimmer, boxer and teacher (born 1959)

Personal information
- Full name: Rebecca Gwendolyn Smith
- Nickname: "Becky"
- National team: Canada
- Born: June 3, 1959 (age 67) Edmonton, Alberta, Canada
- Height: 1.61 m (5 ft 3 in)
- Weight: 56 kg (123 lb)

Sport
- Sport: Swimming
- Strokes: Freestyle, butterfly, medley
Medal record
Women's swimming
Representing Canada
Summer Olympics
Bronze medal – third place	1976 Montreal	400 m medley
Bronze medal – third place	1976 Montreal	4×100 m freestyle
World Championships (LC)
Bronze medal – third place	1975 Cali	4x100 m freestyle
Commonwealth Games
Gold medal – first place	1974 Christchurch	4×100 m freestyle
Silver medal – second place	1974 Christchurch	200 m medley
Silver medal – second place	1974 Christchurch	400 m medley
Silver medal – second place	1978 Edmonton	400 m medley
Bronze medal – third place	1978 Edmonton	200 m medley

Rebecca Gwendolyn Smith (born June 3, 1959), professionally known as Becky Smith and later known by her married name Becky Wiber, is a Canadian former medley and butterfly swimmer who won the bronze medal in the women's 400-metre individual medley at the 1976 Summer Olympics in Montreal, Quebec, Canada, finishing behind East German Ulrike Tauber (gold) and her Canadian teammate Cheryl Gibson (silver). At the same Olympic Games, she also finished third in the women's 4×100-metre freestyle relay, alongside Gail Amundrud, Barbara Clark and Anne Jardin. Her brothers Graham and George and sister Susan also competed in swimming at the Olympic Games.

She was a grade school teacher at Westbrook School in Edmonton, Alberta for Grade 6. She retired in 2019.

== See also ==
- List of Olympic medalists in swimming (women)
- List of Commonwealth Games medallists in swimming (women)
