= Karen Robertson =

Hong Kong swimmer (born 1961)

Personal information
- Nationality: Hong Konger
- Born: 19 July 1961 (age 64)

Sport
- Sport: Swimming
- Club: Harry Wright

Karen Robertson (born 19 July 1961) is a Hong Kong former freestyle swimmer. She competed in two events at the 1976 Summer Olympics.
