= Ida Hansson =

Swedish swimmer

Personal information
- Born: 27 July 1957 (age 68) Gothenburg, Sweden

Sport
- Sport: Swimming

Ida Hansson (born 27 July 1957) is a Swedish former freestyle swimmer. She competed in two events at the 1976 Summer Olympics.
