= Geert Boekhout =

Belgian swimmer

Personal information
- Born: 12 April 1958 (age 68)

Sport
- Sport: Swimming

Geert Boekhout (born 12 April 1958) is a Belgian former freestyle swimmer. She competed in two events at the 1976 Summer Olympics.
