= Wendy Lee (swimmer) =

Canadian swimmer

Personal information
- Born: 5 November 1960 (age 65) Vancouver, British Columbia, Canada

Sport
- Sport: Swimming

Wendy Lee (born 5 November 1960) is a Canadian former swimmer. She competed in the women's 400 metre freestyle at the 1976 Summer Olympics.
