= Vania Vázquez =

Venezuelan swimmer

Personal information
- Born: 3 October 1960 (age 65)

Sport
- Sport: Swimming

Vania Vázquez (born 3 October 1960) is a Venezuelan former swimmer. She competed in three events at the 1976 Summer Olympics.
