= Deirdre Sheehan =

Irish swimmer

Personal information
- Born: 25 September 1957 (age 68)

Sport
- Sport: Swimming

Deirdre Sheehan (born 25 September 1957) is an Irish former swimmer. The holder of a number of regional and national records, she represented Ireland in three events at the 1976 Summer Olympics.
