= Linda Faber =

Dutch swimmer (born 1960)

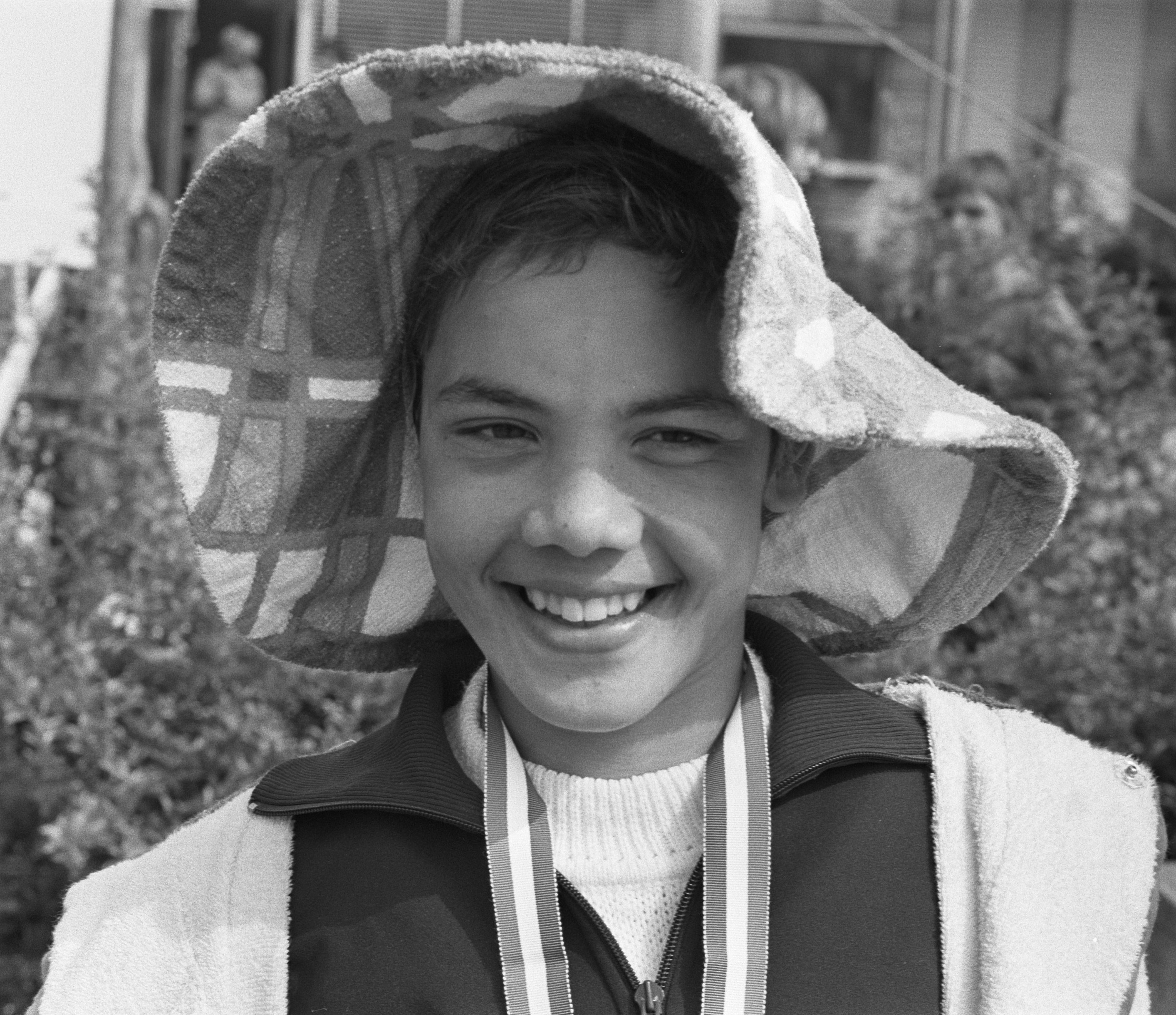

Personal information
- Born: February 29, 1960 (age 66) Veenendaal, Netherlands

Sport
- Sport: Swimming

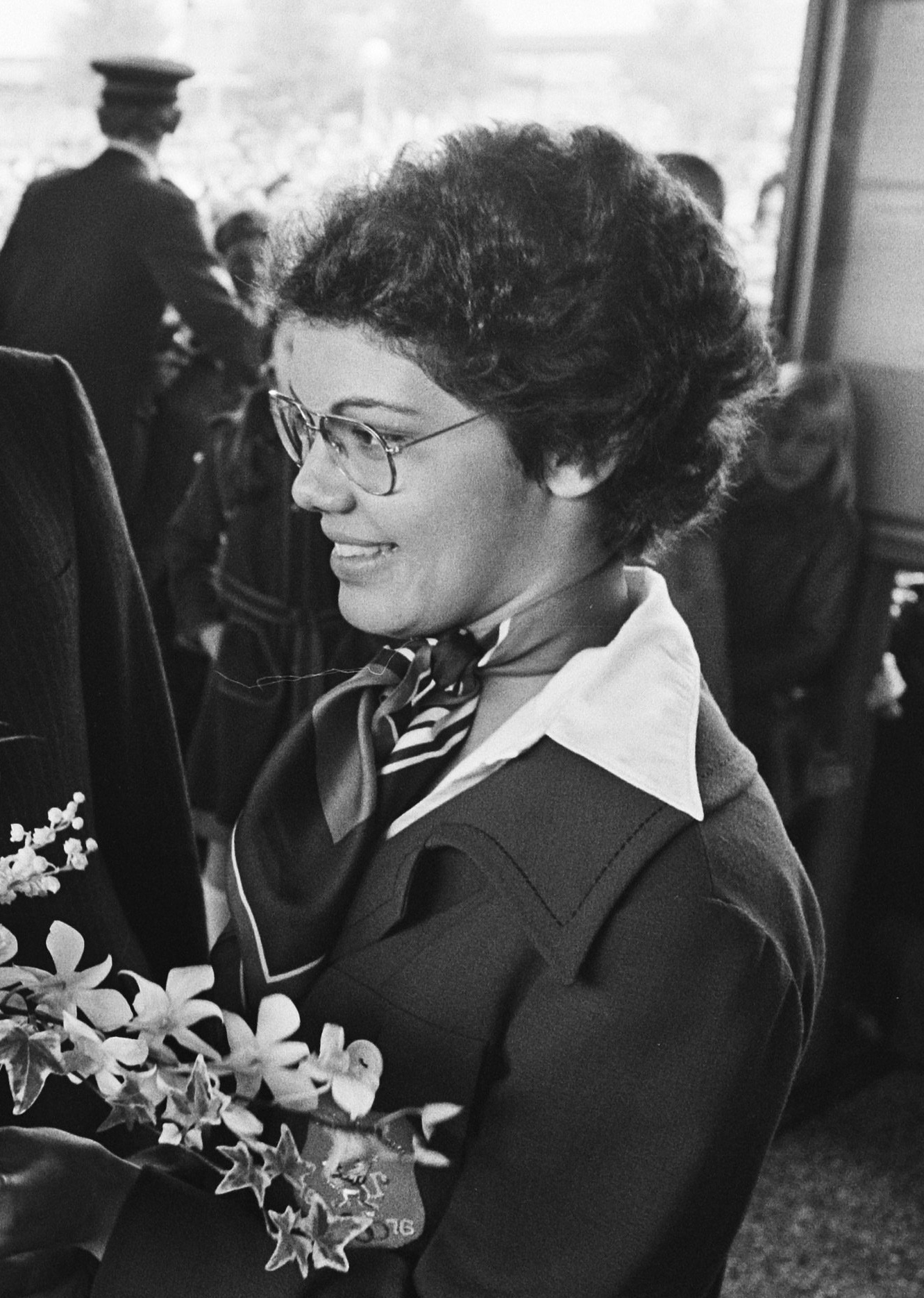
Linda Faber in 1976

Linda Faber (born 29 February 1960) is a former freestyle swimmer from the Netherlands who competed for her native country at the 1976 Summer Olympics in Montreal, Quebec, Canada. She was eliminated in the preliminaries for 400m freestyle. As part of the freestyle team, she came 4th in the 4 × 100 m relay, with Enith Brigitha, Ineke Ran and Annelies Maas.
