= Jenny Tate =

Australian swimmer

Personal information
- Born: 13 July 1960 (age 65)
- Children: Naomi Beer( Bartlett ), Natasha Beer, Ronald Beer, Tyson beer.

Sport
- Sport: Swimming

Jenny Tate (born 13 July 1960) is an Australian former swimmer. She competed in three events at the 1976 Summer Olympics.
