= Ivis Poleo =

Venezuelan swimmer

Personal information
- Born: 2 January 1963 (age 63)

Sport
- Sport: Swimming

Ivis Poleo (born 2 January 1963) is a Venezuelan former swimmer. She competed in two events at the 1976 Summer Olympics.
