= Marina Klyuchnikova =

Russian swimmer

Personal information
- Full name: Марина Владимировна Ключникова
- Nationality: Russian
- Born: 12 July 1959 (age 67) Moscow, Soviet Union

Sport
- Sport: Swimming

Marina Klyuchnikova (born 12 July 1959) is a Russian former swimmer. She competed in two events at the 1976 Summer Olympics representing the Soviet Union.
