= Westbrook School =

Elementary school in Edmonton, Alberta, Canada

Westbrook Elementary School

Location
- 11915-40 Avenue; Edmonton, Alberta; Canada; 53.473201°N 113.542446°W

Information
- Type: Public
- Motto: "Where curiosity transforms"
- Established: January 1967
- School district: Edmonton Public Schools
- Principal: Carrie Grossman-Sharp
- Staff: 36
- Grades: K-6
- Enrollment: 573
- Colour: Blue Brown Red
- Athletics: Cricket, Running
- Primary language: English
- Website: http://westbrook.epsb.ca

Westbrook School is an elementary school located in Edmonton, Alberta Canada with about 600 kids, operated by the Edmonton Public Schools board. It shares a field with Vernon Barford Junior High, it is said that most students do go to Vernon Barford for grades 7 -9. The school opened in January 1967; students selected for the school double shifted with Malmo school from September 1966 until construction was complete. The original 1966 school building was designed by the Massey medal-winning architect, Peter Hemingway.

At first the school had junior high school grades because there was no suitable nearby high school. Early construction problems - in particular, an open plan central area with protruding electrical outlets, and a bridge outside the front door on which students sometimes enjoyed hanging - occasionally caused ambulances to be called.

In 2010 "AMP" was called into action, the year after Shauna Paul became Principal. AMP Consists of Art, Music, and Phys.Ed which rotates around on a daily schedule. All students receive a time table, with their AMP Periods stated on. AMP is used as a practice for Junior High and High School when students will have to remember when and where they have classes. The school became one of four district sites for Academic Challenge, a program for gifted and talented children, in 1984.

== Major awards ==
The stylized 'e' logo.

- 1995
  - Pythagoras Contest - School Provincial Champion
- 1996
  - Pythagoras Contest - School Provincial Champion
- 1997
  - Pythagoras Contest - School Provincial Champion
  - Pythagoras Contest - School Canadian Champion
  - Edmonton Science Olympics - First Place Overall Division II (sponsored by APEGGA - The Association of Professional Engineers, Geologists and Geophysicists of Alberta)
- 2003
  - Canadian National Math League Competition - Provincial winner
  - First, Third and Seventh individual winners
  - Byron-Germain Math contest - individual third in Canada out of 7286 students
  - Fibonacci Contest- Provincial Champion
- 2004
  - Math League Grade 7 top in Canada
  - Fibonacci Contest - Top team in Alberta, Top team in Canada
- 2005
  - American Math League (Grade 8 test) - grade 5 student scored top in province
  - Canadian National Math League - Grade 6 test - Westbrook's team scored top in province and fifth in country (Grade 6 individual scored top in province and top in country) - Grade 7 test - individual tied top in province - Grade 8 test - individual scored top in province - Westbrook's grade 6 team was regional winner
  - Gauss Contest - grade 5 student earned Outstanding Achievement certificate for perfect score. Two other students earned certificates of distinction
  - Byron - Germaine - grade 4 student tied for top in Canada out of 7918 students writing the test
  - Pythagoras - Grade 5 student's perfect paper tied for first in Canada out of 12, 866 students writing the test

== Athletics ==
In 2010, the Boys running team got second place, and in 2012 the Girls Running Team made it to the Quarter-Finals in Heat Five for the Edmonton Journal Games. In the 2010/2011 Cricket Season, Westbrook broke the record of McKernnn's six year winning streak for outdoor cricket. Later in 2025, the boys running team went on to make it to the Quatre-Finals. Another one of the clubs is cross country featuring a run through a forest trail.

== The arts ==
Art is taught by Mrs. Lynette Witherspoon, who teaches Kindergarten- Grade Six Art. 2011 Hosted the First Annual Fine Arts Night, where students showed their parents their artwork that was displayed all around the school. Music: Music is taught by Mrs. Zinn. Every student is taught with videos, and with experience with the instruments, The instruments being: xylophones, ukuleles, drums and recorders. The school became one of four district sites for Academic Challenge, a program for gifted and talented children, in 1984.

== Academics ==
For the 2011 - 2012 year, the Fraser Institute ranked Westbrook, No. 9 out of 665 schools in Alberta. Westbrook is well known for its Academics and Athletics, with some of the highest marks on the Provincial Achievement Tests.
