= Berber Kamstra =

Dutch swimmer

Personal information
- Born: April 1, 1960 (age 66) Zaandijk, Netherlands

Sport
- Sport: Swimming

Berber Kamstra (born 1 April 1960) is a Dutch former freestyle swimmer who competed at the 1976 Summer Olympics in Montreal, Quebec, Canada. She was eliminated in the preliminary heats of the 100 metre freestyle.
