= Barbara Clark =

Canadian swimmer (born 1958)

Personal information
- Full name: Barbara Lynne Clark
- Nickname: "Barb"
- National team: Canada
- Born: September 24, 1958 (age 67) Coronation, Alberta
- Height: 1.68 m (5 ft 6 in)
- Weight: 61 kg (134 lb)

Sport
- Sport: Swimming
- Strokes: Freestyle
- Club: Stettler Centennial Swim Club
Medal record
Women's swimming
Representing Canada
Bronze medal – third place	Montreal 1976	4x100 m freestyle relay

Barbara Lynne Clark (born September 24, 1958), later known by her married name Barbara Parolin, is a former competitive swimmer from Canada, who competed primarily in international freestyle events. At the 1976 Summer Olympics in Montreal, Quebec, Clark won a bronze medal in the women's 4x100-metre freestyle relay, alongside Canadian teammates Becky Smith, Gail Amundrud and Anne Jardin.

== See also ==
- List of Olympic medalists in swimming (women)
