= Marion Platten =

German swimmer

Personal information
- Born: 25 November 1958 (age 67) Düsseldorf, Germany

Sport
- Sport: Swimming

Marion Platten (born 25 November 1958) is a German former swimmer. She competed in three events at the 1976 Summer Olympics. The FRG team for the 200m freestyle included Regina Nissen, Jutta Weber and Platten.
