= Debbie Hill =

British swimmer (born 1960)

Personal information
- Born: 21 June 1960 (age 66)

Sport
- Sport: Swimming

Deborah "Debbie" Hill (born 21 June 1960) is a British former swimmer. She competed in two events at the 1976 Summer Olympics. At the 1980 Summer Olympics she represented Zimbabwe in the women's 3 metre springboard.

She also won the 1975 ASA National Championship 100 metres freestyle title.
