= Petra Priemer =

East German swimmer

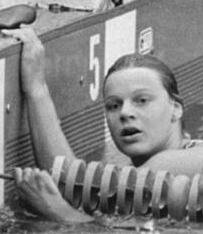
- Priemer in 1977

Personal information
- Born: February 6, 1961 (age 65) Leipzig, East Germany

Sport
- Sport: Swimming
Medal record
Representing East Germany
Olympic Games
| Silver medal – second place | 1976 Montreal | 100 m freestyle |
| Silver medal – second place | 1976 Montreal | 4x100 m freestyle relay |
World Championships
| Silver medal – second place | 1978 West Berlin | 4x100m freestyle relay |
European Championships
| Gold medal – first place | 1977 Jönköping | 4x100m freestyle relay |
| Bronze medal – third place | 1977 Jönköping | 100m freestyle |

Petra Priemer (now Brinkmann, born 6 February 1961 in Leipzig) is a German former swimmer who competed in the 1976 Summer Olympics.
