= Elaine Gray =

British swimmer

Personal information
- Born: 29 May 1958 (age 68)

Sport
- Sport: Swimming

Elaine Gray (born 29 May 1958) is a British former swimmer. She competed in two events at the 1976 Summer Olympics.
