= Debbie Clarke =

Canadian swimmer (born 1961)

Personal information
- Born: 10 April 1961 (age 65) Thunder Bay, Ontario, Canada

Sport
- Sport: Swimming

Debbie Clarke (born 10 April 1961) is a Canadian former freestyle swimmer. She competed in three events at the 1976 Summer Olympics.
