= Marianela Huen =

Venezuelan swimmer

Personal information
- Born: 12 February 1960 (age 66)

Sport
- Sport: Swimming

Marianela Huen (born 12 February 1960) is a Venezuelan former swimmer. She competed in four events at the 1976 Summer Olympics.
