= Jill Sterkel =

American swimmer (born 1961)

- Sterkel in 1984 Olympic photo

Personal information
- Full name: Gillian Ann Sterkel
- National team: United States
- Born: May 27, 1961 (age 65) Hacienda Heights, California, U.S.
- Height: 5 ft 11 in (1.80 m)
- Weight: 170 lb (77 kg)

Sport
- Sport: Swimming
- Strokes: Freestyle
- Club: El Monte Aquatics Club
- College team: University of Texas
- Coach: Don Lamont (El Monte AC); Richard Quick, UT
Medal record
Women's swimming
Representing the United States
Olympic Games
Gold medal – first place	1976 Montreal	4x100 m freestyle
Gold medal – first place	1984 Los Angeles	4x100 m freestyle
Bronze medal – third place	1988 Seoul	50 m freestyle
Bronze medal – third place	1988 Seoul	4x100 m freestyle
World Championships (LC)
Gold medal – first place	1978 Berlin	4x100 m freestyle
Silver medal – second place	1982 Guayaquil	4×100 m freestyle
Silver medal – second place	1982 Guayaquil	4×100 m medley
Bronze medal – third place	1982 Guayaquil	100 m freestyle
Pan American Games
Gold medal – first place	1975 Mexico City	4x100 m freestyle
Gold medal – first place	1983 Caracas	4x100 m freestyle
Silver medal – second place	1975 Mexico City	100 m freestyle
Universiade
Gold medal – first place	1981 Bucharest	100 m freestyle
Gold medal – first place	1981 Bucharest	200 m freestyle
Gold medal – first place	1981 Bucharest	100 m butterfly
Gold medal – first place	1981 Bucharest	4x100 m freestyle
Gold medal – first place	1981 Bucharest	4x100 m medley

Jill Ann Sterkel (born May 27, 1961) is an American former competition swimmer for the University of Texas, an Olympic champion, former world record-holder, and water polo player. Sterkel won four medals in three Olympic Games spanning twelve years from 1976 through 1988, and was the first American woman to qualify for four Olympic games. She later served as the women's head coach for her alma mater, the Texas Longhorns swimming and diving team at the University of Texas at Austin from 1993 to 2006.

== Early swimming ==
Sterkel was born in Hacienda Heights, California, where she swam for Glen A. Wilson High School, graduating in 1979. She began swimming with the highly competitive El Monte Aquatics Club around the age of 10 under club founder and Coach Don LaMont and continued through her High School Senior year, officially swimming for the Club outside of the High School swimming season.

In March, 1979, in her High School Senior year, Sterkel set an American age group record of 49.55 seconds in 100-yard freestyle at the Southern California Invitational Swim Meet. She later set an American age group record in the 100-yard butterfly of 53.76 at the National AAU Short Course Championships at East Los Angeles College in April, 1979. In High School, she typically swam two practices a day totaling around 4 hours, and weight trained three days a week. Sterkel's Wilson High Swim team was undefeated in her Senior year. Her Wilson High School swim team went undefeated through March of her Senior year, with champion swimmer Mary Birdsell as another team member.

== University of Texas swimming ==
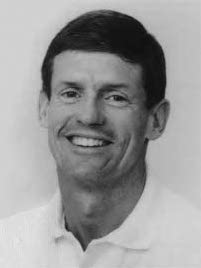
Coach Richard Quick

Sterkel subsequently attended the University of Texas in Austin, Texas, where she swam under Hall of Fame Coach Richard Quick for the Texas Longhorns swimming and diving team in the Association for Intercollegiate Athletics for Women (AIAW) and National Collegiate Athletic Association (NCAA) competition from 1980 to 1983.

As a senior in 1983, Sterkel won the NCAA national championships in the 50-yard butterfly (24.26 seconds) and 100-yard butterfly (53.54 seconds). She won back-to-back Honda Sports Awards for Swimming and Diving, recognizing her as the outstanding college female swimmer of 1979–80 and 1980–81. She won sixteen individual national titles with the Association for Intercollegiate Athletics for Women (AIAW) and helped lead the University of Texas Women's team to AIAW national titles in both the 1981 and 1982 seasons. She won a total of 28 awards citing her as an All-American, the maximum that can be awarded to a collegiate swimmer.

== Olympic competition ==
=== 1976 Olympics ===
Sterkel represented the United States in three Summer Olympics. As a 15-year-old at the 1976 Summer Olympics, she won a gold medal as a member of the winning U.S. team in the women's 4×100-meter freestyle relay, together with her teammates Kim Peyton, Wendy Boglioli and Shirley Babashoff. After the U.S. women's team had been outshone in nearly every event by their East German rivals, Peyton, Boglioli, Sterkel and Babashoff achieved a moral victory by not only winning the relay gold medal, but also by breaking the East Germans' world record in the event final. Individually, she competed in two other events, finishing seventh in the 100-meter freestyle and not advancing beyond the preliminary heats in the 200-meter freestyle.

=== 1980 Olympics ===
Sterkel qualified again for the U.S. national team at the 1980 U.S. Olympic Trials, but because of the American-led boycott of the 1980 Summer Olympics, she was unable to participate at the 1980 games held in Moscow, Russia.

=== 1984 Olympics ===
At the 1984 Summer Olympics in Los Angeles, she swam for the gold medal-winning U.S. team in the preliminary heats of the women's 4×100-meter freestyle. Starting at the 1984 games, relay swimmers who swam in the heats, but did not compete in the event finals, were eligible to receive medals.

=== 1988 Olympics ===
As a 27-year-old at the 1988 Summer Olympics in Seoul, South Korea, she again swam for the U.S. team in the preliminary heats of the 4×100-meter freestyle relay, and earned a bronze medal for the team's third-place finish. She also competed individually in the 50-meter freestyle, tying for third with a time of 25.71 and earning a bronze medal.

She swam in the World Championships in 1978 in Berlin and in 1982 Guayaquil taking a total of four medals including a gold, the Pan American Games in both Mexico City in 1975 and in Caracas in 1983 taking a total of two golds and a silver, and the Bucharest Universiade in 1981 where she won five gold medals.

== Coaching ==
She later served as the head coach of the Texas Longhorns swimming and diving team at the University of Texas at Austin from 1993 to 2006 where she coached Whitney Hedgepeth, and Erin Phenix onto Olympic teams. After 2007, Sterkel remained in Austin and worked as an Assistant Athletic Director for the "T-Association", the University of Texas's Athletic Alumni group, and raised a family.

=== Honors ===
She was also inducted into the Southwest Conference Hall of Fame, and in 2017 the American Swimming Coaches Association (ASCA) Hall of Fame. As a unique honor, in the 1979–80 and the 1980-81 swimming seasons, Terkel received the Broderick Award as the National Swimmer of the Year. During her High School career, she received the National Young American Award for Athletics from the Boy Scouts, and was the Female High School Athlete of the Year for the California Interscholastic Federation (CIF) Southern Section in 1978. In her later career, Sterkel was the 2000 Big 12 Conference Coach of the year and was inducted into the Texas Women's Athletics Hall of Honor.

== See also ==
- List of Olympic medalists in swimming (women)
- List of World Aquatics Championships medalists in swimming (women)
- List of World Aquatics Championships medalists in water polo
- World record progression 50 metres freestyle
- World record progression 4 × 100 metres freestyle relay
- List of University of Texas at Austin alumni
- Texas Longhorns

== Bibliography ==
- De George, Matthew, Pooling Talent: Swimming's Greatest Teams, Rowman & Littlefield, Lanham, Maryland (2014). ISBN 978-1-4422-3701-8.

Records
Preceded by Kelly Asplund	Women's 50-meter freestyle world record-holder (long course); April 10, 1980 – January 29, 1983	Succeeded by Dara Torres
