= Anne Richard (swimmer) =

Belgian swimmer

Personal information
- Born: 10 April 1960 (age 66) Hollogne-aux-Pierres, Belgium

Sport
- Sport: Swimming

Anne Richard (born 10 April 1960) is a Belgian former freestyle swimmer. She competed in four events at the 1976 Summer Olympics.
