= Beate Jasch =

German swimmer (born 1959)

Personal information
- Born: 16 January 1959 (age 67) Krefeld, Germany
- Height: 1.65 m (5 ft 5 in)
- Weight: 52 kg (115 lb)

Sport
- Sport: Swimming
- Club: DSV-Schule Max Ritter, Saarbrücken
Medal record
Women's swimming
Representing West Germany
European Championships
Silver medal – second place	1974 Vienna	4×100 m medley

Beate Jasch (born 16 January 1959) is a retired German swimmer who won a silver medal at the 1974 European Aquatics Championships. She competed at the 1976 Summer Olympics in the 100 m and 200 m butterfly and 100 m and 4 × 100 m freestyle events and finished eighth in the relay. During her career she won four national titles in the 100 m (1976) and 200 m (1976, 1977) butterfly and 200 medley (1976).
