= Vilborg Sverrisdóttir =

Icelandic swimmer

Personal information
- Born: 19 June 1957 (age 69)

Sport
- Sport: Swimming

Vilborg Sverrisdóttir (born 19 June 1957) is an Icelandic former freestyle swimmer. She competed in three events at the 1976 Summer Olympics.
