= Lesleigh Harvey =

Australian swimmer

Personal information
- Born: 24 October 1960 (age 65)

Sport
- Sport: Swimming

Lesleigh Harvey (born 24 October 1960) is an Australian former swimmer. She competed in three events at the 1976 Summer Olympics. She comes from Townsville in Queensland.
