= Jane Fayer =

Puerto Rican swimmer (born 1958)

Personal information
- Born: 29 November 1958 (age 67)

Sport
- Sport: Swimming

Jane Fayer (born 29 November 1958) is a Puerto Rican former swimmer. She competed in four events at the 1976 Summer Olympics.
