= Mark Schubert =

American swim coach

- Schubert around 40, 1988 Olympic photo

Biographical details
- Born: circa 1949
- Education: University of Kentucky

Playing career
- 1968–1971: University of Kentucky (UK)
- Positions: breastroke, freestyle

Coaching career (HC unless noted)
- 1970–1971: U of Ky. Student Coach
- 1971–1972: Cayahuga Falls High School District
- 1972–1985: Mission Viejo Nadadores
- 1985–1988: Mission Bay Makos; Boca Raton
- 1989–1992: University of Texas Women
- 1992–2006: University of Southern California
- 2006–2010: USA Swimming
- 1980–2008: Olympic Coach
- 2011–2016: Golden West Club, Long Beach
- 2016–2022: Returns Mission Viejo Nadadores
- 2022: Saddleback El Toro (SET) Swim Team; Lake Forest, CA
- 2022–2023: Coached in China

Accomplishments and honors

Championships
- NCAA 3 National Championships (UT-1990, 1991, USC-1997); 49 NCAA individual titles

Awards
- '90 NCAA Women Coach of the Year; Coach of the Year, ASCA, USOC, USS; Olympic Coach (1984–2008); International Swimming Hall of Fame

Mark Schubert (born c. 1949) is an American Hall of Fame swim coach best known as the coach of the USC Trojans from 1992–1996, and of the Mission Viejo Nadadores swim club from 1972 to 1985, and 2016 to 2022. He was a long serving Olympic coach (1984–2008) and head swimming coach for the University of Texas women (1989–1992) and University of Southern California (1992–2006), taking his teams to three NCAA National titles.

== Education ==
Schubert was first introduced to swimming by Dick Wells, his High School swim coach at Akron Ohio's Harvey S. Firestone High School. Mark swam the breaststroke and played trombone in the band. Securing a swimming scholarship, he swam for the University of Kentucky where he was an assistant coach his last two years. During his brief tenure, he helped guide the University of Kentucky Swim team to their most successful season in history up to that time. His first head coaching job was from 1971–1972 with Cuyahoga Falls High School in Ohio for one year.

== Mission Viejo Nadadores ==
Starting with the Nadadores at only 23 in 1972, he grew the team from 50 to 500 members, with his swimmers winning 17 total Olympic medals, 124 National Championships, and five World titles. Swimmers from the Nadadores set 88 American, and 21 World records, and won a total of 44 national championship titles. He coached the team for thirteen years through 1985 before returning to the team in 2016. Due to the number of Olympians and world class swimmers he coached, his many years of coaching the Nadadores may have been the most significant part of his coaching legacy.

== College coaching ==
=== University of Texas ===
He coached the University of Texas Women's team from 1989 to 1992 where he mentored NCAA champions, including Leigh Ann Fetter, Whitney Hedgepeth, and backstroker Beth Barr. He took the team to NCAA Championships in 1990 and 1991.

During his career, his teams won three NCAA Championships and 49 NCAA individual titles.

=== University of Southern California ===
He served as the head coach for the University of Southern California men's and women's swim teams from around 1992–2006. In 1997, with the aid of such swimmers as Olympic gold medalist Lindsay Benko, he led the Women's team to his third NCAA championship.

After taking the reins in 2006, he took a paid leave of absence from his role with USA Swimming in September 2010, and was later terminated from his position.

=== Late club coaching ===
Schubert was also the head coach for the Mission Bay Makos from 1985–1988 in Boca Raton, Florida, a large club where his teams won 9 national team titles. Schubert coached college swimming from 1989–2010. In 2011, Schubert coached Golden West Swim Club in Huntington Beach, California. In 2016, he returned to the Mission Viejo Nadadores as head coach, after working closely with Bill Rose who was retiring. Rose, who had been head coach since the 1990's, was admired and respected during his tenure. Schubert continued to drive the team to success through his retirement from the team in 2022. In early 2022, Schubert departed with some pro swimmers to coach at the Saddle Back El Toro (SET) Swim team. As of late 2022, Coach Schubert went to coach swimmers in China.

=== Olympic coaching ===
He has also served as one of the USA's Olympic Swimming Team coaches in: 1980 (which the USA did not attend), 1984, 1988, 1992, 1996, 2000, and 2004. He served as part of the team staff for the 2008 Olympics as well.

=== Olympians coached ===
He has coached many swimming greats such as Shirley Babashoff, Brian Goodell, Mike O'Brien, Janet Evans, Tiffany Cohen, Cynthia Woodhead, Lenny Krayzelburg, and Jill Sterkel. He would coach 1988 Olympian and backstroke specialist Beth Barr at UT, but after she had earned her silver medal in the 4x100 medley relay in the Seoul Olympics. More recent swimmers include Jarett Maycott, USA swimming managing director Lindsay Benko, Jessica Hardy, Erik Vendt, Larsen Jensen, Ous Mellouli, Bernard Mendez, Kristine Quance, Khoa Tran, Dara Torres and Kaitlin Sandeno. While she trained at Mission Viejo for the 1980 Moscow Olympics, Schubert coached Stanford backstroker Linda Jezek, a former 1976 Montreal Olympic Silver medalist in the 4x100 Medley relay.

=== Honors and leadership roles ===
In 1997, he was inducted into the International Swimming Hall of Fame (ISHOF) as an Honor Coach. Widely recognized, he has been named a “Coach of The Year” by American Swimming Coaches Association, United States Olympic Committee, United States Swimming, NCAA and Pac-10.

In late August 2021, Schubert resigned from his position on the American Swimming Association (ASA) Board of Directors. He has served as the Vice-President of the College Swim Coaches Association of America. With United States Swimming, he has served on the Steering, Olympic Operations and Technical Planning committees.

== See also ==
- List of members of the International Swimming Hall of Fame
