= Gail Amundrud =

Canadian swimmer

Personal information
- Full name: Gail Amundrud
- National team: Canada
- Born: April 6, 1957 (age 69) Toronto, Ontario
- Height: 1.86 m (6 ft 1 in)
- Weight: 76 kg (168 lb)

Sport
- Sport: Swimming
- Strokes: Freestyle
- Club: Canadian Dolphin Swim Club
- College team: Arizona State University
Medal record
Women's swimming
Representing Canada
Olympic Games
Bronze medal – third place	1976 Montreal	4×100 m freestyle
World Championships (LC)
Bronze medal – third place	1975 Cali	4×100 m freestyle
Bronze medal – third place	1978 Berlin	4×100 m freestyle
Pan American Games
Silver medal – second place	1975 Mexico City	200 m freestyle
Silver medal – second place	1975 Mexico City	4x100 m freestyle
Silver medal – second place	1979 San Juan	4×100 m freestyle
Silver medal – second place	1979 San Juan	4×100 m medley
Bronze medal – third place	1979 San Juan	100 m freestyle
Bronze medal – third place	1979 San Juan	200 m freestyle
Commonwealth Games
Gold medal – first place	1974 Christchurch	4×100 m freestyle
Gold medal – first place	1974 Christchurch	4×100 m medley
Gold medal – first place	1978 Edmonton	4×100 m freestyle
Silver medal – second place	1974 Christchurch	100 m freestyle
Bronze medal – third place	1974 Christchurch	200 m freestyle

Gail Amundrud-Beattie (born April 6, 1957) is a former competition freestyle swimmer from Canada.

== Swimming career ==
At the 1976 Summer Olympics in Montreal, Quebec, Amundrud won a bronze medal in the women's 4x100-metre freestyle relay, alongside her Canadian teammates Becky Smith, Barbara Clark and Anne Jardin. Individually, she also finished fifth in the final of the 200-metre freestyle, and advanced to the semifinal of the 100-metre freestyle.

Despite being from Canada she won the 'British Open' 1974 ASA National Championship 100 metres freestyle title and the 200 metres freestyle.

== See also ==
- List of Olympic medalists in swimming (women)
- List of Commonwealth Games medallists in swimming (women)
