= Pia Mårtensson =

Swedish swimmer

Personal information
- Born: 3 January 1959 (age 67) Varberg, Sweden

Sport
- Sport: Swimming

Pia Mårtensson (born 3 January 1959) is a Swedish former freestyle swimmer. She competed in three events at the 1976 Summer Olympics.
