= Petra Thümer =

East German swimmer (born 1961)

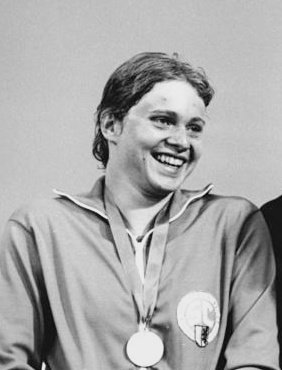
- Petra Thümer in 1976

Personal information
- Nationality: East German
- Born: 29 January 1961 (age 65) Karl-Marx-Stadt, East Germany (now Chemnitz, Saxony, Germany)
- Height: 1.74 m (5 ft 9 in)
- Weight: 62 kg (137 lb)

Sport
- Sport: Swimming
- Strokes: Freestyle
- Club: SC Karl-Marx-Stadt
Medal record
Women's swimming
Representing East Germany
Olympic Games
Gold medal – first place	1976 Montreal	400 m freestyle
Gold medal – first place	1976 Montreal	800 m freestyle
European Championships
Gold medal – first place	1977 Jönköping	200 m freestyle
Gold medal – first place	1977 Jönköping	400 m freestyle
Gold medal – first place	1977 Jönköping	800 m freestyle

Petra Thümer (later Deckert then Katzur, born 29 January 1961) is a former swimmer from East Germany. She won gold medals in the 400 m and 800 m freestyle at the 1976 Summer Olympics and the 1977 European Aquatics Championships. During her career she set five world records in the 400 m and 800 m freestyle. In 1987 she was inducted into the International Swimming Hall of Fame.

Later she admitted to using performance-enhancing drugs as part of the East German training system. For this reason she missed the 1978 World Championships – coaches feared she would not pass the doping test and excluded her from the East German team, officially explaining her absence by injuries.

In 1979 she retired from swimming and worked as a photographer.

She was married to the German Olympic athletes Klaus Katzur (swimmer) and Alf-Gerd Deckert (cross-country skier).

== See also ==
- List of members of the International Swimming Hall of Fame
