= Ineke Ran =

Dutch swimmer (born 1962)

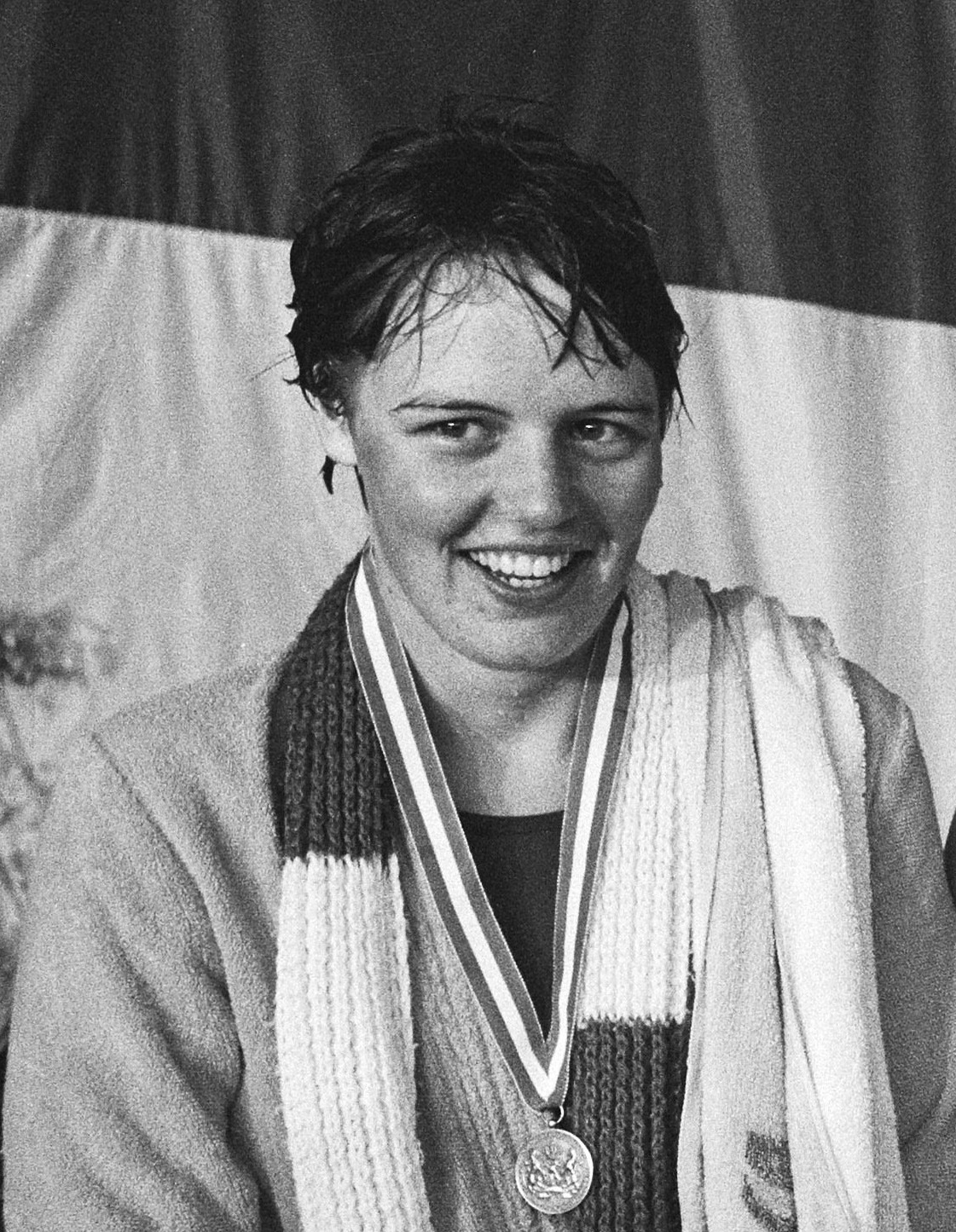
- Ineke Ran in 1978

Personal information
- Born: April 20, 1962 (age 64) Badhoevedorp, Netherlands

Sport
- Sport: Swimming
- Strokes: Freestyle, butterfly
Medal record
Representing Netherlands
European Championships (LC)
Silver medal – second place	1977 Jönköping	4×100 m freestyle
Bronze medal – third place	1977 Jönköping	100m butterfly

Ineke Yvonne Ran (born 20 April 1962, in Badhoevedorp) is a former freestyle and butterfly swimmer from the Netherlands, who competed for her native country at the 1976 Summer Olympics in Montreal, Quebec, Canada. She was eliminated in the preliminaries for 100m and 200m freestyle and 100m butterfly. She swam in the preliminaries for the Dutch relay team that ended up in fifth place in the 4 × 100 m medley. As part of the freestyle team she was 4th in the 4 × 100 m relay, together with Enith Brigitha, Linda Faber and Annelies Maas. She won two medals at the 1977 European Aquatics Championships, bronze in 100m butterfly and silver 4 × 100 m freestyle relay.
