= Drue Le Guier =

Australian swimmer

Personal information
- Born: 2 May 1959 (age 67)

Sport
- Sport: Swimming
- Strokes: freestyle

Drue Le Guier (born 2 May 1959) is an Australian former swimmer. She competed in two events at the 1976 Summer Olympics.
