= Regina Nissen =

German swimmer (born 1961)

Personal information
- Born: 24 January 1961 (age 65) Flensburg, Germany

Sport
- Sport: Swimming

Regina Nissen (born 24 January 1961) is a German former swimmer. She competed in three events at the 1976 Summer Olympics. The FRG team for the 200m freestyle included Marion Platten, Jutta Weber and Nissen.
