= María Pérez (swimmer) =

Venezuelan swimmer

Personal information
- Born: 20 July 1962 (age 64)

Sport
- Sport: Swimming

María Pérez (born 20 July 1962) is a Venezuelan former swimmer. She competed in three events at the 1976 Summer Olympics.
