= Irina Vlasova =

Russian swimmer

Personal information
- Nationality: Russian
- Born: 9 February 1957 (age 69) Ivanovo, Soviet Union

Sport
- Sport: Swimming

Irina Vlasova (born 9 February 1957) is a Russian former freestyle swimmer. She competed in four events at the 1976 Summer Olympics representing the Soviet Union.
