= Lyubov Kobzova =

Russian swimmer

Personal information
- Nationality: Russian
- Born: 11 May 1957 (age 69) Moscow, Soviet Union

Sport
- Sport: Swimming

Lyubov Kobzova (born 11 May 1957) is a Russian former swimmer. She competed in three events at the 1976 Summer Olympics representing the Soviet Union.
