= Susana Coppo =

Argentine swimmer

Personal information
- Born: 26 November 1959 (age 66)

Sport
- Sport: Swimming

Susana Coppo (born 26 November 1959) is an Argentine former swimmer. She competed in five events at the 1976 Summer Olympics.
