= Anne Jardin =

Canadian swimmer (born 1959)

Personal information
- Full name: Anne Elizabeth Jardin
- National team: Canada
- Born: July 26, 1959 (age 66) Montreal, Quebec, Canada
- Height: 1.79 m (5 ft 10 in)
- Weight: 77 kg (170 lb)

Sport
- Sport: Swimming
- Strokes: Freestyle
- Club: Pointe-Claire Swim Club
Medal record
Women's swimming
Representing Canada
Olympic Games
Bronze medal – third place	1976 Montreal	4×100 m freestyle
Bronze medal – third place	1976 Montreal	4×100 m medley
Pan American Games
Silver medal – second place	1975 Mexico City	4x100 m freestyle
Silver medal – second place	1979 San Juan	4×100 m freestyle
Bronze medal – third place	1975 Mexico City	200 m freestyle
British Commonwealth Games
Gold medal – first place	1974 Christchurch	4×100 m freestyle

Anne Elizabeth Jardin (born July 26, 1959), later known by her married name Anne Alexander, is a Canadian former competition swimmer who won two bronze medals at the 1976 Summer Olympics in her hometown of Montreal.

She finished third in the women's 4x100-metre freestyle relay, alongside Becky Smith, Gail Amundrud and Barbara Clark, and also ended up in third place in the 4x100 medley relay, with Wendy Cook, Robin Corsiglia and Susan Sloan. She broke the world record in the 50-metre freestyle on August 19, 1978, in Etobicoke, Ontario.

Jardin is currently a physical education teacher, as well as a Student Success teacher at Frank Ryan Senior Elementary School in Ottawa, Ontario.

Her niece, Barbara Jardin, is a swimmer who competed at the 2012 Summer Olympics.

== See also ==
- List of Olympic medalists in swimming (women)
- List of Commonwealth Games medallists in swimming (women)
- World record progression 50 metres freestyle
