= Enith Brigitha =

Dutch swimmer (born 1955)

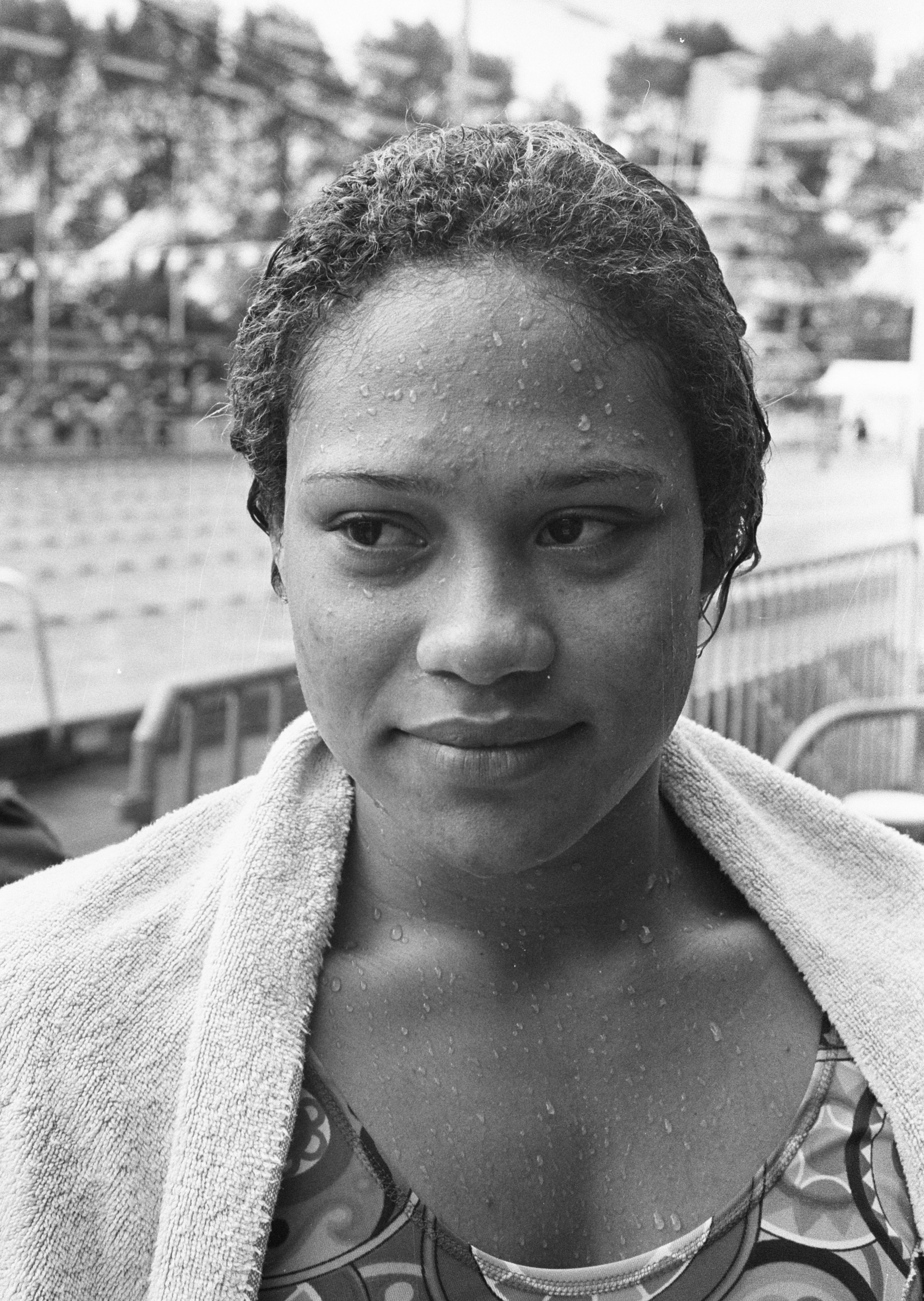

Personal information
- Full name: Enith Sijtje Maria Brigitha
- National team: Netherlands
- Born: 15 April 1955 (age 71) Willemstad, Curaçao, Netherlands Antilles

Sport
- Sport: Swimming
- Strokes: Freestyle, backstroke
Medal record
Women's swimming
Representing the Netherlands
Olympic Games
Bronze medal – third place	1976 Montreal	100 m freestyle
Bronze medal – third place	1976 Montreal	200 m freestyle
World Championships (LC)
Silver medal – second place	1973 Belgrade	200 m backstroke
Bronze medal – third place	1973 Belgrade	100 m freestyle
Bronze medal – third place	1975 Cali	100 m freestyle
Bronze medal – third place	1975 Cali	200 m freestyle
Bronze medal – third place	1975 Cali	4×100 m medley
European Championships (LC)
Silver medal – second place	1974 Vienna	200 m freestyle
Silver medal – second place	1974 Vienna	4×100 m freestyle
Silver medal – second place	1977 Jönköping	100 m freestyle
Silver medal – second place	1977 Jönköping	4×100 m freestyle
Bronze medal – third place	1974 Vienna	100 m freestyle
Bronze medal – third place	1974 Vienna	100 m backstroke
Bronze medal – third place	1974 Vienna	200 m backstroke

Enith Sijtje Maria Brigitha (born 15 April 1955) is a former leading competitive swimmer in the 1970s. She twice represented the Netherlands at the Summer Olympics, starting in 1972 (Munich, West Germany). She won two bronze medals at the 1976 Summer Olympics in Montreal, Quebec, Canada, in the women's 100 m and 200 m freestyle. Brigitha twice was named 'Dutch Sportswoman of the Year', in 1973 and 1974. She was the first black athlete to win a swimming medal in the Olympics.

== Early life ==
Brigitha was born in Curaçao on 15 April 1955. She was the eldest daughter of a Dutch mother and an Antillean father. She learned to swim in the seas that surround Curaçao. She first participated in the Kingdom Games in 1967 as a swimmer, returning in 1968 where she won gold, which motivated her mother and her to move to the Netherlands for Enith to pursue her swimming career. In the Netherlands, she trained under coach Willie Storm at the swimming club Het Y in Amsterdam.

== East Germany doping controversy ==
In the 100m freestyle, Brigitha finished behind two swimmers from East Germany, a country proven to have engaged in systematic doping of its athletes in the Montreal 1976 Olympic games. As a result, other athletes have called for Brigitha to be officially awarded the gold in the 100m freestyle and silver in the 200m freestyle. Brigitha has said she considers herself a gold medal winner.

American Shirley Babashoff, who would have earned three individual golds were it not for the East Germans, has been outspoken about this issue. She supports Brigitha and swimmers from other countries who were adversely affected by the East German illegal practices.

== In popular culture ==
The 2022 graphic novel Swim Team by Johnnie Christmas takes place at the fictional Enith Brigitha middle school.

Awards
Preceded by Ans van Gerven	Dutch Sportswoman of the Year; 1973–1974	Succeeded by Dianne de Leeuw
