= Rebecca Perrott =

New Zealand swimmer

Rebecca Perrott MBE
Personal information
- Born: Rebecca Vivian Mary Perrott; 20 June 1961 (age 65) Wellington, New Zealand

Sport
- Country: Fiji; New Zealand
- Sport: Swimming
Medal record
Women's swimming
Representing New Zealand
Commonwealth Games
Gold medal – first place	1978 Edmonton	200 m freestyle
Silver medal – second place	1978 Edmonton	200 m indiv. medley
Bronze medal – third place	1978 Edmonton	400 m freestyle
Bronze medal – third place	1978 Edmonton	800 m freestyle

Rebecca Vivian Mary Perrott MBE (born 20 June 1961) is a swimmer from New Zealand, who won the gold medal in the women's 200 metres freestyle at the 1978 Commonwealth Games. She was fourth in the women's 400m freestyle at the 1976 Summer Olympics.

In the 1980 New Year Honours, Perrott was appointed a Member of the Order of the British Empire, for services to swimming. She was considered a possible medallist for the 1980 Summer Olympics but was denied the opportunity due to the boycott by the majority of New Zealand Olympic sports associations.

At 15 she was the youngest person to represent New Zealand at the Olympics. At 12½ she was the youngest competitor at the 1974 British Commonwealth Games; swimming for Fiji as her father was Registrar at the University of the South Pacific.

In 1994 she won a silver medal at the world surf championships in Britain. In 2011, she broke six New Zealand Masters swimming records.

== See also ==
- List of Commonwealth Games medallists in swimming (women)

Awards
Preceded by Dick Quax	Lonsdale Cup of the New Zealand Olympic Committee; 1978	Succeeded by Ian Ferguson
