= Guylaine Berger =

French swimmer (born 1956)

Personal information
- Born: 12 April 1956 (age 70)
- Height: 1.69 m (5 ft 7 in)
- Weight: 58 kg (128 lb)

Sport
- Sport: Swimming
- Club: CN Maisons-Alfort/CN Paris/AS Sucy
Medal record
Representing France
European Championships
Bronze medal – third place	1974 Vienna	4×100 m freestyle

Guylaine Berger (born 12 April 1956) is a retired French swimmer who won a bronze medal in the 4 × 100 m freestyle at the 1974 European Aquatics Championships. She also competed in several events at the 1972, 1976 and 1980 Summer Olympics. Her best achievements were sixth place in the 4 × 100 m freestyle in 1976 and seventh in the 100 m freestyle in 1980.
