= Georgina Osorio =

Panamanian swimmer (born 1958)

Personal information
- Born: 12 November 1958 (age 67)

Sport
- Sport: Swimming

Georgina Osorio (born 12 November 1958) is a Panamanian former swimmer. She competed in three events at the 1976 Summer Olympics.
