= Andrea Pollack =

East German swimmer (1961–2019)

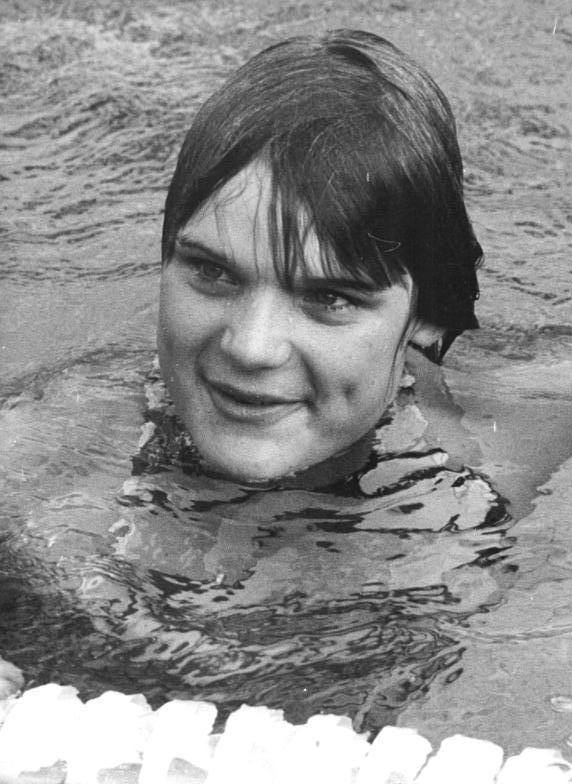
- Andrea Pollack in 1977

Personal information
- Nationality: East German
- Born: 8 May 1961 Schwerin, Mecklenburg-Vorpommern, East Germany (now Germany)
- Died: 13 March 2019 (aged 57) Berlin, Germany
- Height: 1.66 m (5 ft 5 in)
- Weight: 61 kg (134 lb)

Sport
- Sport: Swimming
- Strokes: Butterfly, Freestyle
- Club: SC Dynamo Berlin
Medal record
Women's swimming
Representing East Germany
Olympic Games
Gold medal – first place	1976 Montreal	200 m butterfly
Gold medal – first place	1976 Montreal	4×100 m medley
Gold medal – first place	1980 Moscow	4×100 m medley
Silver medal – second place	1976 Montreal	4×100 m freestyle
Silver medal – second place	1976 Montreal	100 m butterfly
Silver medal – second place	1980 Moscow	100 m butterfly
World ChampionsHips (LC)
Silver medal – second place	1978 Berlin	100 m butterfly
Silver medal – second place	1978 Berlin	4×100 m medley
Bronze medal – third place	1978 Berlin	200 m butterfly
European Championships (LC)
Gold medal – first place	1977 Jönköping	100 m butterfly
Gold medal – first place	1977 Jönköping	4×100 m medley
Silver medal – second place	1977 Jönköping	200 m butterfly

Andrea Pollack (later Pinske; 8 May 1961 – 13 March 2019) was a butterfly swimmer from East Germany who won three Olympic gold medals.

Pollack was born in 1961 in Schwerin. She was a member of SC Dynamo Berlin. She who won two gold medals at the 1976 Summer Olympics in Montreal, Quebec, Canada, at age fifteen. She won the individual 200 m butterfly and with the women's relay team in the 4×100 m medley. Pollack also collected two silver medals at the Montreal Games.

Pollack won a gold in the 4×100 m medley relay and a silver in the 100 m butterfly at the 1980 Moscow Olympics. In 1978 she twice broke the world record in the women's 200 m butterfly. In 1998, several former East German swimmers, including Pollack, went public with accusations against their coaches and physicians that they were systematically doped.

Pollack married Norbert Pinske who competed in cycling. Their son, Michael Pinske, went to the 2008 Summer Olympics as a judoka.

== See also ==
- List of members of the International Swimming Hall of Fame

Records
Preceded by (East Germany) Christiane Knacke	Women's 100 metre butterfly world record holder (long course); 3 July 1978 – 11 April 1980	Succeeded by (United States) Mary T. Meagher
Preceded by (East Germany) Rosemarie Gabriel	Women's 200 metre butterfly world record holder (long course); 9 April 1978 – 7 July 1979	Succeeded by (United States) Mary T. Meagher
