= Claudia Hempel =

East German swimmer (born 1958)

Personal information
- Born: September 25, 1958 (age 67) Merseburg, East Germany

Sport
- Sport: Swimming
Medal record
Representing East Germany
Olympic Games
Silver medal – second place	1976 Montreal	4x100 m freestyle relay
World Championships
Gold medal – first place	1975 Cali	4x100m freestyle relay
Gold medal – first place	1975 Cali	4x100m medley relay

Claudia Hempel (later Thamke, born 25 September 1958) is a German former swimmer who competed in the 1976 Summer Olympics.
