= Swimming at the 1976 Summer Olympics =

Swimming at the Games of the XXI Olympiad
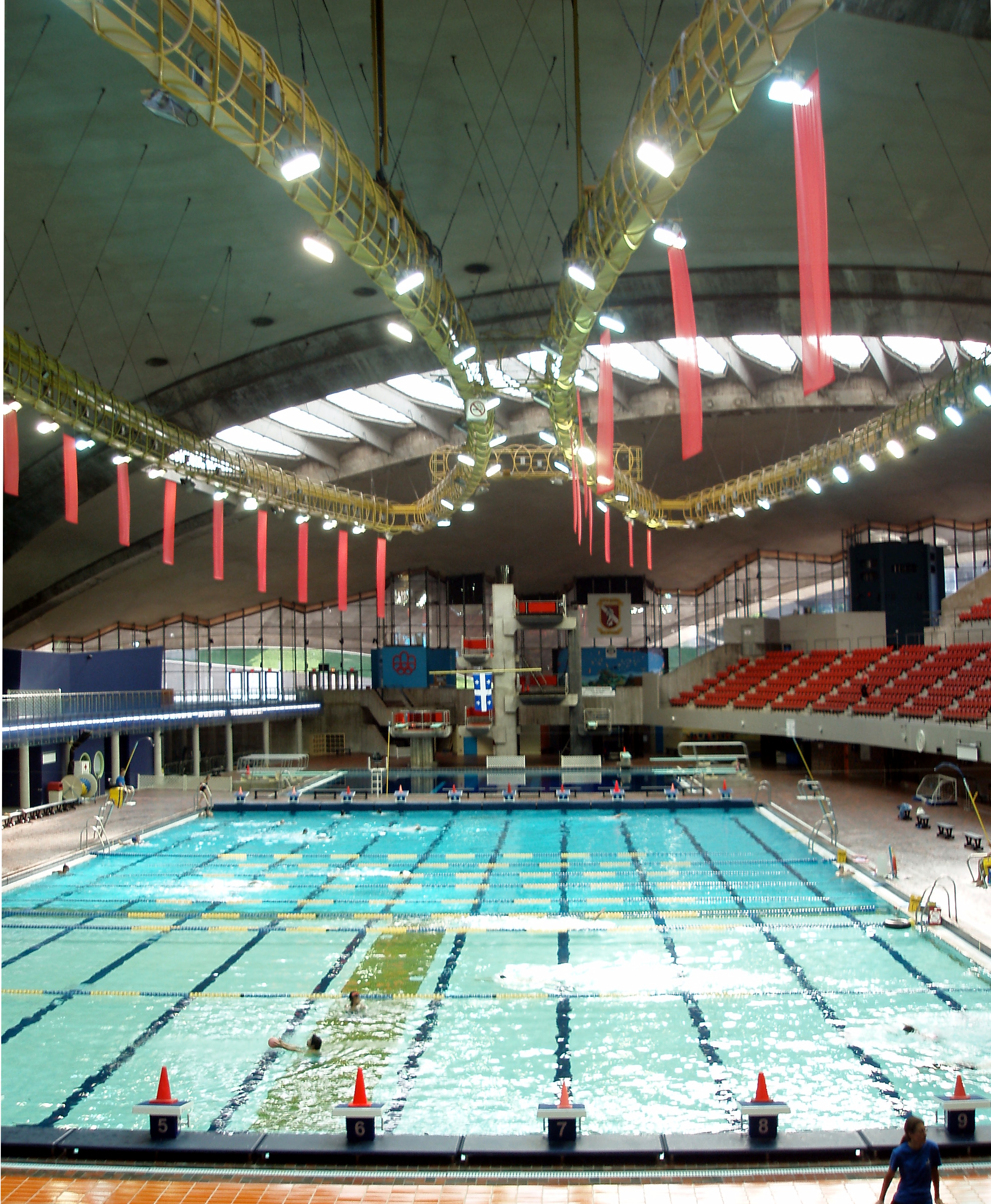
- Venue: Olympic Pool
- Competitors: 471 from 51 nations

The 1976 Summer Olympics were held in Montreal, Quebec, Canada; 26 events in swimming were contested. There was a total of 471 participants from 51 countries competing.

== Participating nations ==
471 swimmers from 51 nations competed.

- Argentina (5)
- Australia (28)
- Austria (1)
- Bahamas (2)
- Belgium (10)
- Brazil (9)
- Bulgaria (5)
- Canada (38)
- Colombia (5)
- Costa Rica (1)
- Iran (7)
- Czechoslovakia (1)
- Denmark (2)
- East Germany (23)
- Ecuador (1)
- Finland (1)
- France (16)
- Great Britain (39)
- Greece (2)
- Hong Kong (4)
- Hungary (8)
- Iceland (3)
- Indonesia (1)
- Ireland (4)
- Israel (2)
- Italy (13)
- Japan (15)
- Malaysia (1)
- Mexico (9)
- Monaco (1)
- Netherlands (15)
- New Zealand (9)
- Nicaragua (2)
- Norway (7)
- Panama (3)
- Paraguay (1)
- Philippines (3)
- Poland (3)
- Portugal (5)
- Puerto Rico (12)
- Soviet Union (31)
- Spain (14)
- Sweden (18)
- Switzerland (2)
- Thailand (2)
- Tunisia (2)
- United States (51)
- Virgin Islands (2)
- Uruguay (1)
- Venezuela (12)
- West Germany (22)
- Yugoslavia (4)

== Medal table ==
Rank	Nation	Gold	Silver	Bronze	Total
1	United States	13	14	7	34
2	East Germany	11	6	2	19
3	Soviet Union	1	3	5	9
4	Great Britain	1	1	1	3
5	Canada	0	2	6	8
6	Netherlands	0	0	2	2
6	West Germany	0	0	2	2
8	Australia	0	0	1	1
Totals (8 entries)		26	26	26	78

== Medal summary ==
=== Men's events ===
Games	Gold		Silver		Bronze	
100 m freestyle	Jim Montgomery; United States	49.99 (WR)	Jack Babashoff; United States	50.81	Peter Nocke; West Germany	51.31
200 m freestyle	Bruce Furniss; United States	1:50.29 (WR)	John Naber; United States	1:50.50	Jim Montgomery; United States	1:50.58
400 m freestyle	Brian Goodell; United States	3:51.93 (WR)	Tim Shaw; United States	3:52.54	Vladimir Raskatov; Soviet Union	3:55.76
1500 m freestyle	Brian Goodell; United States	15:02.40 (WR)	Bobby Hackett; United States	15:03.91	Stephen Holland; Australia	15:04.66
100 m backstroke	John Naber; United States	55.49 (WR)	Peter Rocca; United States	56.34	Roland Matthes; East Germany	57.22
200 m backstroke	John Naber; United States	1:59.19 (WR)	Peter Rocca; United States	2:00.55	Dan Harrigan; United States	2:01.35
100 m breaststroke	John Hencken; United States	1:03.11 (WR)	David Wilkie; Great Britain	1:03.43	Arvydas Juozaitis; Soviet Union	1:04.23
200 m breaststroke	David Wilkie; Great Britain	2:15.11 (WR)	John Hencken; United States	2:17.26	Rick Colella; United States	2:19.20
100 m butterfly	Matt Vogel; United States	54.35	Joe Bottom; United States	54.50	Gary Hall, Sr. United States	54.65
200 m butterfly	Mike Bruner; United States	1:59.23 (WR)	Steve Gregg; United States	1:59.54	Bill Forrester; United States	1:59.96
400 m individual medley	Rod Strachan; United States	4:23.68 (WR)	Tim McKee; United States	4:24.62	Andrey Smirnov; Soviet Union	4:26.90
4 × 200 m freestyle relay	United States; John Naber; Mike Bruner; Bruce Furniss; Jim Montgomery	7:23.22 (WR)	Soviet Union; Vladimir Raskatov; Andrei Bogdanov; Sergey Kopliakov; Andrey Krylov	7:27.97	Great Britain; Alan McClatchey; Brian Brinkley; Gordon Downie; David Dunne	7:32.11
4 × 100 m medley relay	United States; John Naber; John Hencken; Matt Vogel; Jim Montgomery	3:42.22 (WR)	Canada; Stephen Pickell; Graham Smith; Clay Evans; Gary MacDonald	3:45.94	West Germany; Klaus Steinbach; Michael Kraus; Walter Kusch; Peter Nocke	3:47.29

=== Women's events ===
Games	Gold		Silver		Bronze	
100 m freestyle	Kornelia Ender; East Germany	55.65 (WR)	Petra Priemer; East Germany	56.49	Enith Brigitha; Netherlands	56.65
200 m freestyle	Kornelia Ender; East Germany	1:59.26 (WR)	Shirley Babashoff; United States	2:01.22	Enith Brigitha; Netherlands	2:01.40
400 m freestyle	Petra Thümer; East Germany	4:09.89 (WR)	Shirley Babashoff; United States	4:10.46	Shannon Smith; Canada	4:14.60
800 m freestyle	Petra Thümer; East Germany	8:37.14 (WR)	Shirley Babashoff; United States	8:37.59	Wendy Weinberg; United States	8:42.60
100 m backstroke	Ulrike Richter; East Germany	1:01.83 (OR)	Birgit Treiber; East Germany	1:03.41	Nancy Garapick; Canada	1:03.71
200 m backstroke	Ulrike Richter; East Germany	2:13.43 (OR)	Birgit Treiber; East Germany	2:14.97	Nancy Garapick; Canada	2:15.60
100 m breaststroke	Hannelore Anke; East Germany	1:11.16	Lyubov Rusanova; Soviet Union	1:13.04	Marina Koshevaya; Soviet Union	1:13.30
200 m breaststroke	Marina Koshevaya; Soviet Union	2:33.35 (WR)	Marina Yurchenya; Soviet Union	2:36.08	Lyubov Rusanova; Soviet Union	2:36.22
100 m butterfly	Kornelia Ender; East Germany	1:00.13 (=WR)	Andrea Pollack; East Germany	1:00.98	Wendy Boglioli; United States	1:01.17
200 m butterfly	Andrea Pollack; East Germany	2:11.41 (OR)	Ulrike Tauber; East Germany	2:12.50	Rosemarie Gabriel; East Germany	2:12.86
400 m individual medley	Ulrike Tauber; East Germany	4:42.77 (WR)	Cheryl Gibson; Canada	4:48.10	Becky Smith; Canada	4:50.48
4 × 100 m freestyle relay	United States; Kim Peyton; Jill Sterkel; Shirley Babashoff; Wendy Boglioli	3:44.82 (WR)	East Germany; Petra Priemer; Kornelia Ender; Claudia Hempel; Andrea Pollack	3:45.50	Canada; Becky Smith; Gail Amundrud; Barbara Clark; Anne Jardin	3:48.81
4 × 100 m medley relay	East Germany; Ulrike Richter; Hannelore Anke; Kornelia Ender; Andrea Pollack	4:07.95 (WR)	United States; Camille Wright; Shirley Babashoff; Linda Jezek; Lauri Siering	4:14.55	Canada; Susan Sloan; Robin Corsiglia; Wendy Hogg; Anne Jardin	4:15.22

== Gallery of the medalists ==
Some of the Olympic medalists in Montreal:

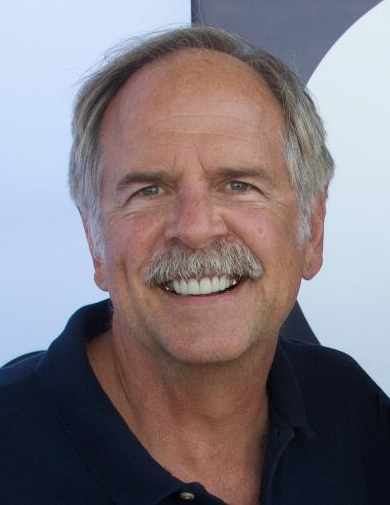
John Naber, winner of the 100-metre backstroke, 200-metre backstroke, 4 × 200-metre freestyle relay, and 4 × 100-metre medley relay.

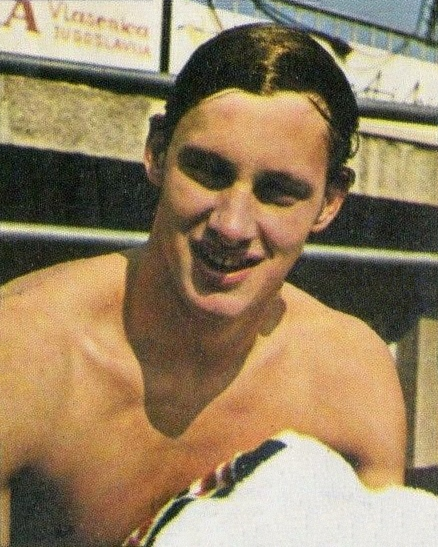
Jim Montgomery, winner of the 100-metre freestyle, 4 × 200-metre freestyle relay, and 4 × 100-metre medley relay.

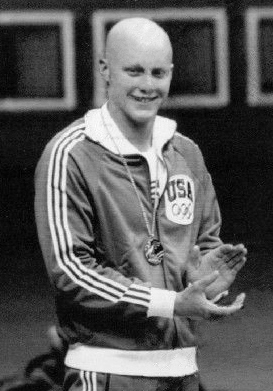
Mike Bruner, winner of the 200-metre butterfly and 4 × 200-metre freestyle relay.

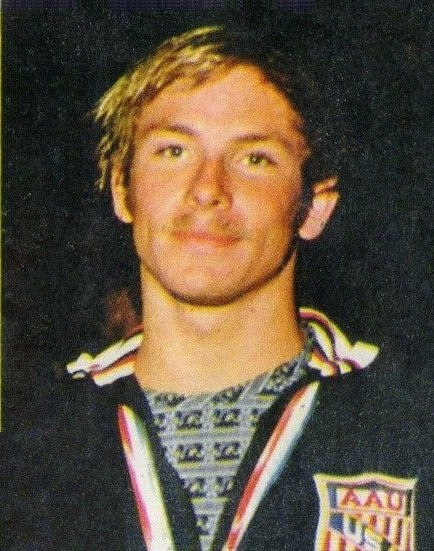
John Hencken, winner of the 100-metre breaststroke and 4 × 100-metre medley relay.

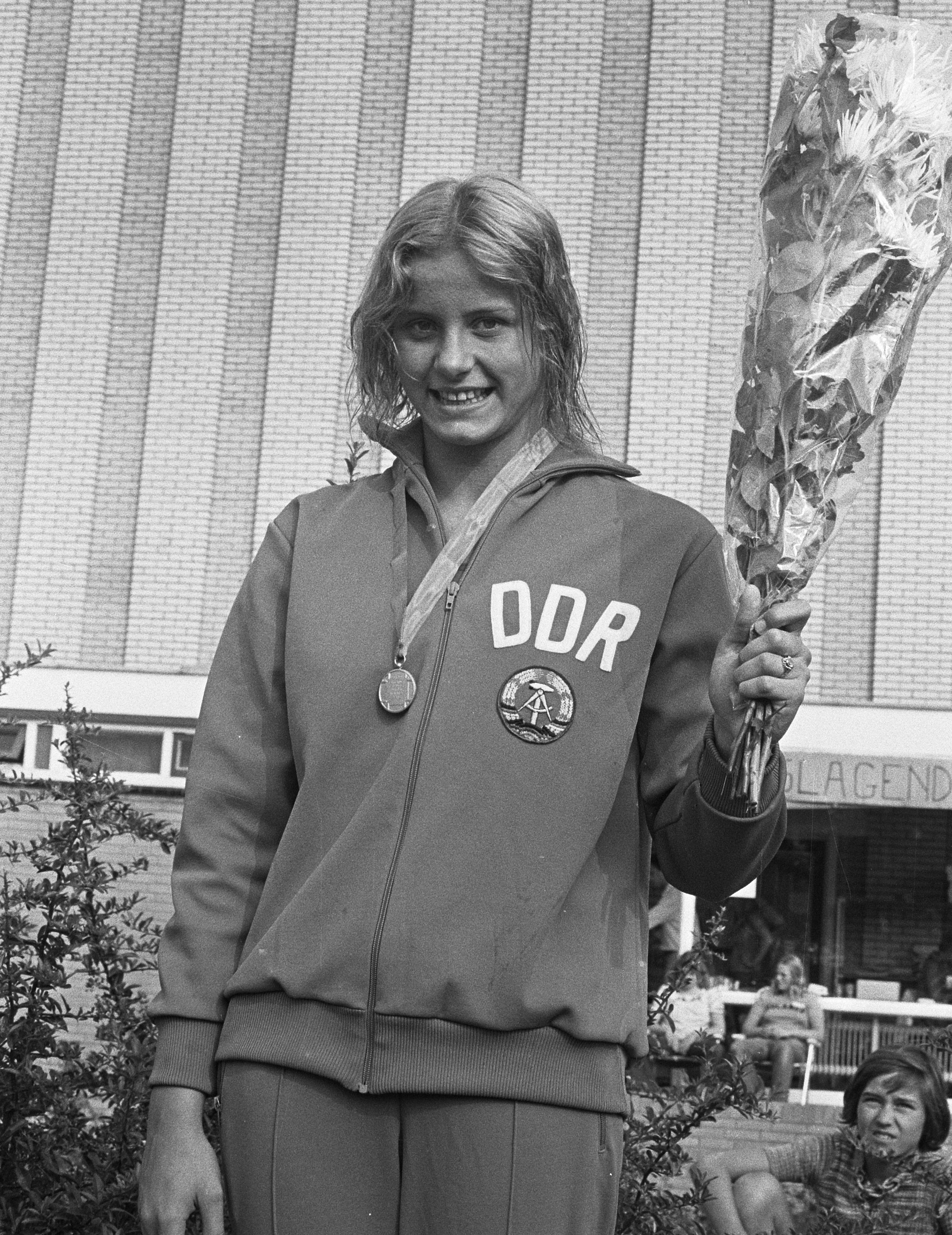
Kornelia Ender, winner of the 100-metre freestyle, 200-metre freestyle, 100-metre butterfly, and 4 × 100-metre medley relay.

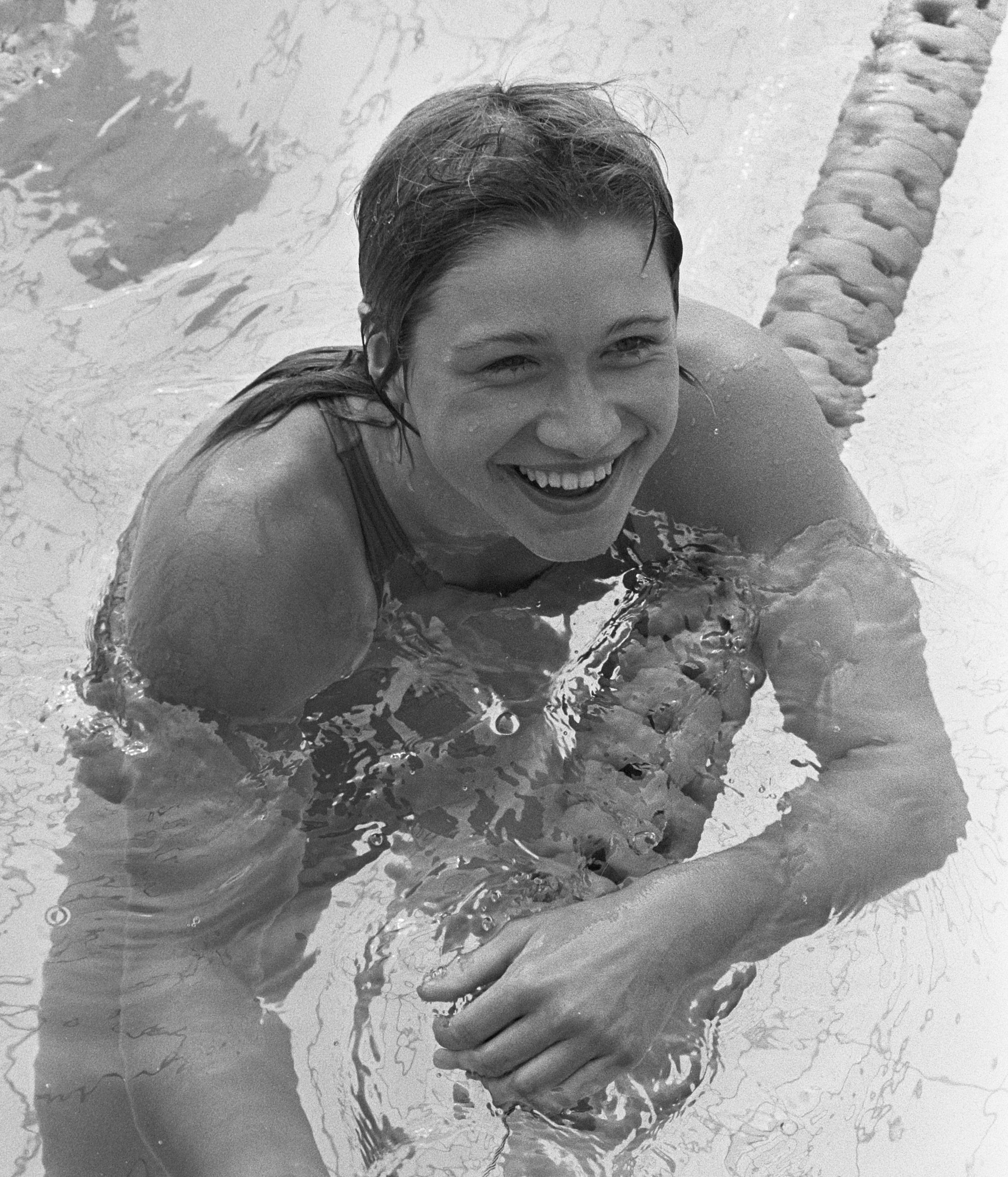
Ulrike Richter, winner of the 100-metre backstroke, 200-metre backstroke, and 4 × 100-metre medley relay.

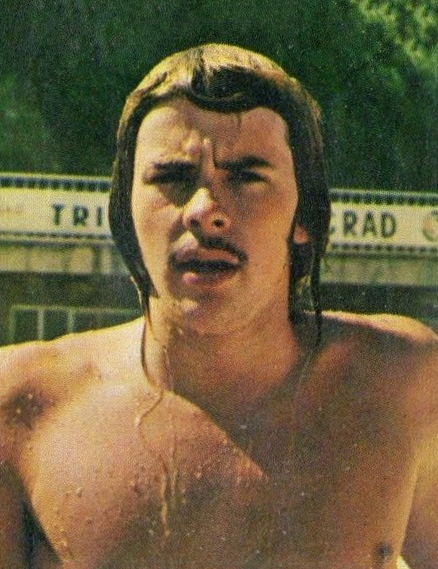
David Wilkie, winner of the 200-metre breaststroke.

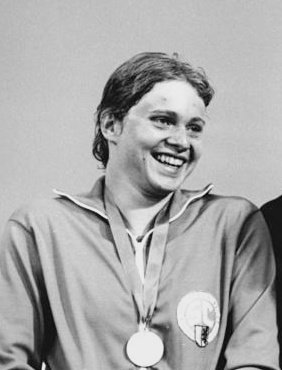
Petra Thümer, winner of the 400-metre freestyle and 800-metre freestyle.
