= Swimming at the 1984 Summer Olympics – Women's 400 metre freestyle =

Women's 400 metre freestyle at the Games of the XXIII Olympiad
- Venue: McDonald's Olympic Swim Stadium
- Date: 31 July 1984 (heats & final)
- Competitors: 26 from 18 nations
- Winning time: 4:07.10 OR

Medalists
1st place, gold medalist(s)		Tiffany Cohen	United States
2nd place, silver medalist(s)		Sarah Hardcastle	Great Britain
3rd place, bronze medalist(s)		June Croft	Great Britain

The final of the women's 400 metre freestyle event at the 1984 Summer Olympics was held in the McDonald's Olympic Swim Stadium in Los Angeles, California, on July 31, 1984.

== Records ==
Prior to this competition, the existing world and Olympic records were as follows.

World record	Tracey Wickham (AUS)	4:06.28	West Berlin	24 August 1978
Olympic record	Ines Diers (GDR)	4:08.76	Moscow, Soviet Union	22 July 1980

The following records were established during the competition:

Date	Round	Name	Nation	Time	Record
31 July	Final A	Tiffany Cohen	United States	4:07.10	OR

== Results ==
=== Heats ===
Rule: The eight fastest swimmers advance to final A (Q), while the next eight to final B (q).

Rank	Heat	Lane	Name	Nationality	Time	Notes
1	4	4	Tiffany Cohen	United States	4:11.49	Q
2	4	5	Sarah Hardcastle	Great Britain	4:11.55	Q, NR
3	3	4	Kim Linehan	United States	4:15.08	Q
4	3	3	Anna McVann	Australia	4:15.21	Q
5	2	4	June Croft	Great Britain	4:15.51	Q
6	2	3	Julie Daigneault	Canada	4:16.60	Q
7	2	5	Jolande van der Meer	Netherlands	4:16.65	Q
8	4	3	Birgit Kowalczik	West Germany	4:17.92	Q
9	3	6	Ann Linder	Sweden	4:18.28	q
10	1	6	Monica Olmi	Italy	4:18.70	q
11	1	5	Carla Lasi	Italy	4:18.90	q
12	1	4	Ina Beyermann	West Germany	4:18.94	q, WD
13	4	6	Donna McGinnis	Canada	4:19.48	q
14	4	2	Chikako Nakamori	Japan	4:20.13	q, NR
15	3	5	Susie Baumer	Australia	4:20.69	q
16	3	7	Lisa Ann Wen	Chinese Taipei	4:23.30	q
17	2	2	Irma Huerta	Mexico	4:25.13	q
18	3	2	Nadia Krüger	Switzerland	4:28.20	
19	2	6	Junko Sakurai	Japan	4:28.68	
20	1	3	Sofia Dara	Greece	4:31.76	
21	1	2	Hadar Rubinstein	Israel	4:34.95	
22	4	1	Carol Ann Heavey	Ireland	4:36.07	
23	3	1	Karen Slowing-Aceituno	Guatemala	4:36.87	
24	1	7	Chang Hui-chien	Chinese Taipei	4:42.47	
25	4	7	Fenella Ng	Hong Kong	4:43.41	
	2	7	Faten Ghattas	Tunisia	DNS	

=== Finals ===
==== Final B ====
Rank	Lane	Name	Nationality	Time	Notes
9	7	Susie Baumer	Australia	4:15.46	
10	6	Donna McGinnis	Canada	4:15.59	
11	4	Ann Linder	Sweden	4:17.55	
12	3	Carla Lasi	Italy	4:18.57	
13	5	Monica Olmi	Italy	4:19.22	
14	2	Chikako Nakamori	Japan	4:20.18	
15	1	Lisa Ann Wen	Chinese Taipei	4:21.61	
16	8	Irma Huerta	Mexico	4:23.34	

==== Final A ====
Rank	Lane	Name	Nationality	Time	Notes
1st place, gold medalist(s)	4	Tiffany Cohen	United States	4:07.10	OR
2nd place, silver medalist(s)	5	Sarah Hardcastle	Great Britain	4:10.27	NR
3rd place, bronze medalist(s)	2	June Croft	Great Britain	4:11.49	
4	3	Kim Linehan	United States	4:12.26	
5	6	Anna McVann	Australia	4:13.95	
6	1	Jolande van der Meer	Netherlands	4:16.05	
7	8	Birgit Kowalczik	West Germany	4:16.33	
8	7	Julie Daigneault	Canada	4:16.41	
