= Swimming at the 1984 Summer Olympics – Women's 800 metre freestyle =

Women's 800 metre freestyle at the Games of the XXIII Olympiad
- Venue: McDonald's Olympic Swim Stadium
- Date: 3 August 1984 (heats & final)
- Competitors: 23 from 16 nations
- Winning time: 8:24.96 OR

Medalists
1st place, gold medalist(s)		Tiffany Cohen	United States
2nd place, silver medalist(s)		Michele Richardson	United States
3rd place, bronze medalist(s)		Sarah Hardcastle	Great Britain

The final of the women's 800 metre freestyle event at the 1984 Summer Olympics was held at the McDonald's Olympic Swim Stadium in Los Angeles, California, on August 3, 1984.

== Records ==
Prior to this competition, the existing world and Olympic records were as follows.

World record	Tracey Wickham (AUS)	8:24.62	Edmonton, Canada	5 August 1978
Olympic record	Michelle Ford (AUS)	8:28.90	Moscow, Soviet Union	26 July 1980

The following records were established during the competition:

Date	Round	Name	Nation	Time	Record
3 August	Final A	Tiffany Cohen	United States	8:24.95	OR

== Results ==
=== Heats ===
Rule: The eight fastest swimmers advance to final A (Q).

Rank	Heat	Lane	Name	Nationality	Time	Notes
1	2	4	Michele Richardson	United States	8:32.64	Q
2	2	5	Anna McVann	Australia	8:35.19	Q
3	1	4	Sarah Hardcastle	Great Britain	8:35.87	Q
4	1	5	Carla Lasi	Italy	8:41.84	Q, NR
5	3	4	Tiffany Cohen	United States	8:41.86	Q
6	3	6	Karen Ward	Canada	8:45.37	Q
7	2	2	Monica Olmi	Italy	8:45.83	Q
8	3	5	Jolande van der Meer	Netherlands	8:46.58	Q
9	3	2	Ann Linder	Sweden	8:50.80	
10	2	6	Donna McGinnis	Canada	8:51.71	
11	1	6	Birgit Kowalczik	West Germany	8:53.34	
12	3	1	Irma Huerta	Mexico	8:56.18	
13	3	3	Susie Baumer	Australia	8:56.40	
14	1	3	Annabelle Cripps	Great Britain	8:58.09	
15	2	3	Laurence Bensimon	France	9:01.75	
16	1	7	Nadia Krüger	Switzerland	9:07.95	
17	3	7	Lisa Ann Wen	Chinese Taipei	9:09.73	
18	2	7	Junko Sakurai	Japan	9:13.27	
19	2	8	Karen Slowing-Aceituno	Guatemala	9:20.68	
20	1	1	Chang Hui-chien	Chinese Taipei	9:34.93	
	1	2	Sofia Dara	Greece	DNS	
	2	1	Hadar Rubinstein	Israel	DNS	
	3	8	Rosa Fuentes	Mexico	DNS	

=== Final ===
Rank	Lane	Name	Nationality	Time	Notes
1st place, gold medalist(s)	2	Tiffany Cohen	United States	8:24.96	OR
2nd place, silver medalist(s)	4	Michele Richardson	United States	8:30.73	
3rd place, bronze medalist(s)	3	Sarah Hardcastle	Great Britain	8:32.60	NR
4	5	Anna McVann	Australia	8:37.94	
5	6	Carla Lasi	Italy	8:42.45	
6	8	Jolande van der Meer	Netherlands	8:42.86	
7	1	Monica Olmi	Italy	8:47.32	
8	7	Karen Ward	Canada	8:48.12	
