= Mexico at the 1984 Summer Olympics =

- IOC code: MEX
- NOC: Mexican Olympic Committee

in Los Angeles
- Competitors: 99 (77 men and 22 women) in 18 sports
- Flag bearer: Ivar Sisniega
- Medals Ranked 17th: Gold 2 Silver 3 Bronze 1 Total 6

Summer Olympics appearances (overview)
- 1900; 1904–1920; 1924; 1928; 1932; 1936; 1948; 1952; 1956; 1960; 1964; 1968; 1972; 1976; 1980; 1984; 1988; 1992; 1996; 2000; 2004; 2008; 2012; 2016; 2020; 2024

Mexico competed at the 1984 Summer Olympics in Los Angeles, United States. 99 competitors, 77 men and 22 women, took part in 87 events in 18 sports.

== Medalists ==
Medal	Name	Sport	Event	Date
Gold	Ernesto Canto	Athletics	Men's 20 kilometres walk	3 August
Gold	Raúl González	Athletics	Men's 50 kilometres walk	11 August
Silver	Daniel Aceves	Wrestling	Men's Greco-Roman 52 kg	2 August
Silver	Raúl González	Athletics	Men's 20 kilometres walk	3 August
Silver	Héctor López	Boxing	Men's bantamweight	11 August
Bronze	José Youshimatz	Cycling	Men's points race	3 August

== Archery ==
In its second Olympic archery competition, Mexico entered one man and one woman. Aurora Breton, a veteran of Mexico's first appearance in the 1972 archery competition, took ninth place.

Women's Individual Competition:

- Aurora Bretón — 2481 points (→ 9th place)

Men's Individual Competition:

- Adolfo González — 2418 points (→ 33rd place)

== Athletics ==
Men's 5,000 metres

- Gerardo Alcala

- Heat — 13:50.60
- Semifinals — 13:45.98 (→ did not advance)

- Eduardo Castro

- Heat — 13:51.46
- Semifinals — 13:42.04 (→ did not advance)

Men's 10,000 metres

- José Gómez

- Qualifying Heat — 28:28.50 (→ did not advance)

- Martín Pitayo

- Qualifying Heat — 28:59.19 (→ did not advance)

Men's Marathon

- Jesús Herrera — 2:20:33 (→ 36th place)
- Rodolfo Gómez — did not finish (→ no ranking)
- Miguel Angel Cruz — did not finish (→ no ranking)

Men's Javelin Throw

- Juan de la Garza

- Qualification — 79.16m (→ did not advance, 14th place)

Men's 20 km Walk

- Ernesto Canto

- Final — 1:23:13 (→ Gold Medal)

- Raúl González

- Final — 1:23:20 (→ Silver Medal)

- Marcelino Colín

- Final — 1:28:26 (→ 17th place)

Men's 50 km Walk

- Raúl González

- Final — 3:47:26 (→ Gold Medal)

- Ernesto Canto

- Final — 4:07:59 (→ 10th place)

- Martín Bermúdez

- Final — DSQ (→ no ranking)

Women's Marathon

- María Trujillo

- Final — 2:38:50 (→ 25th place)

- Maria Cardenas

- Final — 2:51:03 (→ 40th place)

- Maria Luisa Ronquillo

- Final — 2:51:04 (→ 41st place)

Women's 400m Hurdles

- Alma Vázquez

- Heat — 1:00.86 (→ did not advance)

== Boxing ==
Men's Flyweight

- Fausto García

Men's Bantamweight (54 kg)

- Héctor López → Silver Medal

- First Round — Bye
- Second Round — Defeated Johnny Assadoma (INA), KO-3
- Third Round — Defeated Joe Orewa (NGR), 4:1
- Quarterfinals — Defeated Ndaba Dube (ZIM), 5:0
- Semifinals — Defeated Dale Walters (CAN), 5:0
- Final — Lost to Maurizio Stecca (ITA), 1:4

Men's Featherweight

- Javier Camacho

Men's Lightweight

- Luciano Solis

Men's Light-Welterweight

- Octavio Robles

Men's Welterweight

- Genaro Léon

== Cycling ==
Eight cyclists represented Mexico in 1984.

Individual road race

- Raúl Alcalá — +1:43 (→ 11th place)
- Luis Ramos — +6:14 (→ 17th place)
- Salvador Rios — +22:20 (→ 47th place)
- Jesús Rios — did not finish (→ no ranking)

Team time trial

- Raúl Alcalá
- Félipe Enríquez
- Guillermo Gutiérrez
- Cuauthémoc Muñoz

Points race

- José Youshimatz

- Final — 29 points (→ Bronze Medal)

== Diving ==
Men's 3m Springboard

- Jorge Mondragón

- Preliminary Round — 537.03
- Final — 550.35 (→ 9th place)

- Carlos Girón

- Preliminary Round — 549.75
- Final — 530.04 (→ 12th place)

== Fencing ==
One female fencer represented Mexico in 1984.

Women's foil

- Lourdes Lozano

== Modern pentathlon ==
Three male pentathletes represented Mexico in 1984.

Individual

- Ivar Sisniega
- Alejandro Yrizar
- Marcelo Hoyo

Team

- Ivar Sisniega
- Alejandro Yrizar
- Marcelo Hoyo

== Shooting ==
- 25 metres rapid-fire pistol, men - Mario Sánchez (=26th place)
- 10 metres air rifle, men - José Álvarez (=36th place); Víctor Garcés (46th place)
- 50 metres rifle three positions, men - José Álvarez (=30th place); Víctor Garcés (38th place)
- 50 metres rifle prone, men - Víctor Garcés (9th place); José Álvarez (41st place)
- Trap, open - Diego García (=17th place); Guillermo Castellanos (=41st place)
- Skeet, open - Nuria Ortiz (9th place); Ángel Guzmán (46th place)
- 25 metres pistol, women - Mónica Patron (29th place)

== Swimming ==
Men's 100m Freestyle

- Ramiro Estrada

- Heat — 52.07 (→ did not advance, 23rd place)

- César Sánchez

- Heat — 54.94 (→ did not advance, 48th place)

Men's 200m Freestyle

- César Sánchez

- Heat — 1:55.82 (→ did not advance, 31st place)

- Carlos Romo

- Heat — 1:58.77 (→ did not advance, 42nd place)

Men's 100m Backstroke

- Ernesto Vela

- Heat — 1:01.42 (→ did not advance, 32nd place)

Men's 200m Backstroke

- Ernesto Vela

- Heat — 2:10.30 (→ did not advance, 26th place)

Men's 100m Breaststroke

- Eduardo Morillo

- Heat — 1:06.82 (→ did not advance, 31st place)

Men's 200m Breaststroke

- Eduardo Morillo

- Heat — 2:23.72 (→ did not advance, 20th place)

Men's 100m Butterfly

- Carlos Romo

- Heat — 57.61 (→ did not advance, 32nd place)

Men's 200m Individual Medley

- Eduardo Morillo

- Heat — 2:09.87 (→ did not advance, 23rd place)

Men's 4 × 100 m Freestyle Relay

- José Medina, Ramiro Estrada, César Sánchez, and Carlos Romo

- Heat — 3:33.86 (→ did not advance, 16th place)

Men's 4 × 100 m Medley Relay

- Ernesto Vela, Eduardo Morillo, Carlos Romo, and Ramiro Estrada

- Heat — 3:56.11 (→ did not advance, 14th place)

Women's 100m Freestyle

- Patricia Kohlmann

- Heat — 58.76 (→ did not advance, 20th place)

- Teresa Rivera

- Heat — 59.61 (→ did not advance, 25th place)

Women's 200m Freestyle

- Patricia Kohlmann

- Heat — 2:07.75 (→ did not advance, 21st place)

- Irma Huerta

- Heat — 2:09.52 (→ did not advance, 24th place)

Women's 400m Freestyle

- Irma Huerta

- Heat — 4:25.13
- B-Final — 4:23.34 (→ 16th place)

Women's 800m Freestyle

- Irma Huerta

- Heat — 8:56.18 (→ did not advance, 12th place)

- Rosa Fuentes

- Heat — DNS (→ did not advance, no ranking)

Women's 100m Backstroke

- Teresa Rivera

- Heat — 1:06.39 (→ did not advance, 21st place)

Women's 200m Backstroke

- Teresa Rivera

- Heat — 2:22.94 (→ did not advance, 20th place)

Women's 4 × 100 m Freestyle Relay

- Patricia Kohlmann, Teresa Rivera, Rosa Fuentes, and Irma Huerta

- Heat — 3:58.31 (→ did not advance)

Women's 4 × 100 m Medley Relay

- Teresa Rivera, Sara Guido, Maria Urbina, and Patricia Kohlmann

- Heat — DSQ (→ did not advance)

== Synchronized swimming ==
Women's Solo

- Pilar Ramírez
- Claudia Novelo
- Lourdes Candini

Women's Duet

- Claudia Novelo and Pilar Ramírez
