= Swimming at the 1984 Summer Olympics – Women's 200 metre butterfly =

Women's 200 metre butterfly at the Games of the XXIII Olympiad
- Venue: McDonald's Olympic Swim Stadium
- Date: 4 August 1984 (heats & final)
- Competitors: 31 from 20 nations
- Winning time: 2:06.90 OR

Medalists
1st place, gold medalist(s)		Mary T. Meagher	United States
2nd place, silver medalist(s)		Karen Phillips	Australia
3rd place, bronze medalist(s)		Ina Beyermann	West Germany

The final of the women's 200 metre butterfly event at the 1984 Summer Olympics was held in the McDonald's Olympic Swim Stadium in Los Angeles, California, on August 4, 1984.

== Records ==
Prior to this competition, the existing world and Olympic records were as follows.

World record	Mary T. Meagher (USA)	2:05.96	Brown Deer, United States	13 August 1981
Olympic record	Ines Geißler (GDR)	2:10.44	Moscow, Soviet Union	21 July 1980

The following records were established during the competition:

Date	Round	Name	Nation	Time	Record
4 August	Final A	Mary T. Meagher	United States	2:06.90	OR

== Results ==
=== Heats ===
Rule: The eight fastest swimmers advance to final A (Q), while the next eight to final B (q).

Rank	Heat	Lane	Name	Nationality	Time	Notes
1	4	4	Mary T. Meagher	United States	2:11.48	Q
2	3	6	Karen Phillips	Australia	2:11.81	Q
3	1	6	Samantha Purvis	Great Britain	2:11.97	Q, NR
4	3	4	Nancy Hogshead	United States	2:12.10	Q
5	4	5	Ina Beyermann	West Germany	2:13.26	Q
6	2	4	Naoko Kume	Japan	2:13.31	Q
7	1	5	Sonja Hausladen	Austria	2:13.50	Q, NR
8	2	5	Janet Tibbits	Australia	2:13.74	QSO
8	4	3	Conny van Bentum	Netherlands	2:13.74	QSO
10	3	3	Kiyomi Takahashi	Japan	2:14.37	q
11	1	3	Roberta Lanzarotti	Italy	2:14.53	q
12	4	6	Jill Horstead	Canada	2:14.88	q
13	3	5	Marie Moore	Canada	2:14.95	q
14	1	4	Petra Zindler	West Germany	2:15.20	q
15	2	3	Ann Osgerby	Great Britain	2:16.31	q
16	2	6	Carole Brook	Switzerland	2:18.66	q
17	2	2	Monica Olmi	Italy	2:18.72	q
18	3	2	Kathrine Bomstad	Norway	2:19.46	
19	1	2	Gail Jonson	New Zealand	2:20.55	
20	1	7	Anna Doig	New Zealand	2:20.81	
21	1	1	Julie Parkes	Ireland	2:20.85	
22	2	7	Lisa Ann Wen	Chinese Taipei	2:21.10	
23	4	2	Brigitte Wanderer	Austria	2:21.16	
24	4	7	Shelley Cramer	Virgin Islands	2:22.39	
25	2	1	Faten Ghattas	Tunisia	2:22.58	
26	3	7	Hadar Rubinstein	Israel	2:22.78	
27	3	8	Chang Hui-chien	Chinese Taipei	2:24.89	
28	4	8	Blanca Morales	Guatemala	2:25.03	
29	3	1	Jodie Lawaetz	Virgin Islands	2:25.58	
	2	8	Nevine Hafez	Egypt	DNS	
	4	1	Karin Brandes	Peru	DNS	

==== Swimoff ====
Rank	Lane	Name	Nationality	Time	Notes
1	4	Conny van Bentum	Netherlands	2:13.60	Q
2	5	Janet Tibbits	Australia	2:15.54	q, WD

=== Finals ===
==== Final B ====
Rank	Lane	Name	Nationality	Time	Notes
9	3	Jill Horstead	Canada	2:13.49	
10	5	Roberta Lanzarotti	Italy	2:14.54	
11	6	Marie Moore	Canada	2:14.96	
12	4	Kiyomi Takahashi	Japan	2:16.27	
13	8	Monica Olmi	Italy	2:16.47	
14	2	Petra Zindler	West Germany	2:16.50	
15	1	Carole Brook	Switzerland	2:16.74	
16	7	Ann Osgerby	Great Britain	2:19.10	

==== Final A ====
Rank	Lane	Name	Nationality	Time	Notes
1st place, gold medalist(s)	4	Mary T. Meagher	United States	2:06.90	OR
2nd place, silver medalist(s)	5	Karen Phillips	Australia	2:10.56	OC
3rd place, bronze medalist(s)	2	Ina Beyermann	West Germany	2:11.91	NR
4	6	Nancy Hogshead	United States	2:11.98	
5	3	Samantha Purvis	Great Britain	2:12.33	
6	7	Naoko Kume	Japan	2:12.57	
7	1	Sonja Hausladen	Austria	2:15.38	
8	8	Conny van Bentum	Netherlands	2:17.39	
