= Swimming at the 1983 Pan American Games – Women's 100 metre freestyle =

Women's 100 metre freestyle at the 1983 Pan American Games
- Venue: -
- Dates: August 17 (preliminaries and finals)
- Competitors: from - nations

Medalists
Gold medal	Carrie Steinseifer	United States
Silver medal	Jane Kerr	Canada
Bronze medal	Kathy Bald	Canada

The women's 100-metre freestyle competition of the swimming events at the 1983 Pan American Games took place on 17 August. The last Pan American Games champion was Cynthia Woodhead of the US.

This race consisted of two lengths of the pool, both lengths being in freestyle.

== Results ==
All times are in minutes and seconds.

KEY:	q	Fastest non-qualifiers	Q	Qualified	GR	Games record	NR	National record	PB	Personal best	SB	Seasonal best

=== Final ===
The final was held on August 17.

Rank	Name	Nationality	Time	Notes
1st place, gold medalist(s)	Carrie Steinseifer	United States	56.92	
2nd place, silver medalist(s)	Jane Kerr	Canada	57.51	
3rd place, bronze medalist(s)	Kathy Bald	Canada	57.76	
4	Kathy Treible	United States	57.83	
5	Virginia Sachero	Argentina	59.09	
6	Teresa Rivera	Mexico	59.10	
7	Patricia Kohlmann	Mexico	1:00.29	
8	Sandra Crousse	Peru	1:00.43	
