= Swimming at the 1983 Pan American Games – Women's 400 metre freestyle =

Women's 400 metre freestyle at the 1983 Pan American Games
- Venue: -
- Dates: August 19 (preliminaries and finals)
- Competitors: from - nations

Medalists
Gold medal	Tiffany Cohen	United States
Silver medal	Cynthia Woodhead	United States
Bronze medal	Julie Daigneault	Canada

The women's 400 metre freestyle competition of the swimming events at the 1983 Pan American Games took place on 19 August. The last Pan American Games champion was Cynthia Woodhead of US.

This race consisted of eight lengths of the pool, with all eight being in the freestyle stroke.

== Results ==
All times are in minutes and seconds.

KEY:	q	Fastest non-qualifiers	Q	Qualified	GR	Games record	NR	National record	PB	Personal best	SB	Seasonal best

=== Final ===
The final was held on August 19.

Rank	Name	Nationality	Time	Notes
1st place, gold medalist(s)	Tiffany Cohen	United States	4:12.27	
2nd place, silver medalist(s)	Cynthia Woodhead	United States	4:14.07	
3rd place, bronze medalist(s)	Julie Daigneault	Canada	4:19.91	
4	Donna McGinnis	Canada	4:23.74	
5	Irma Huerta	Mexico	4:32.02	
6	Isabel Miranda	Brazil	4:34.24	
7	Maria Cuesta	Cuba	4:34.95	NR
8	Patricia Bartiett	Trinidad and Tobago	4:40.41	
