= Swimming at the 1983 Pan American Games – Women's 400 metre individual medley =

Women's 400 metre individual medley at the 1983 Pan American Games
- Venue: -
- Dates: August 17 (preliminaries and finals)
- Competitors: from - nations

Medalists
Gold medal	Tracy Caulkins	United States
Silver medal	Polly Winde	United States
Bronze medal	Michelle MacPherson	Canada

The women's 400 metre individual medley competition of the swimming events at the 1983 Pan American Games took place on 17 August. The last Pan American Games champion was Tracy Caulkins of US.

This race consisted of eight lengths of the pool. The first two lengths were swum using the butterfly stroke, the second pair with the backstroke, the third pair of lengths in breaststroke, and the final two were freestyle.

== Results ==
All times are in minutes and seconds.

KEY:	q	Fastest non-qualifiers	Q	Qualified	GR	Games record	NR	National record	PB	Personal best	SB	Seasonal best

=== Final ===
The final was held on August 17.

Rank	Name	Nationality	Time	Notes
1st place, gold medalist(s)	Tracy Caulkins	United States	4:51.82	
2nd place, silver medalist(s)	Polly Winde	United States	4:54.11	
3rd place, bronze medalist(s)	Michelle MacPherson	Canada	4:54.86	
4	Donna McGinnis	Canada	5:04.13	
5	Jodie Lawaetz	U.S. Virgin Islands	5:13.16	
6	Karen Brandes	Peru	5:14.40	
7	Irma Huerta	Mexico	5:14.82	
8	Magdalena Frigo	Venezuela	5:17.37	
