= Swimming at the 1979 Pan American Games – Women's 4 × 100 metre medley relay =

Women's 4 × 100 metre medley relay at the 1979 Pan American Games
- Venue: Piscina Olimpica Del Escambron
- Dates: July 2 (preliminaries and finals)
- Competitors: from - nations

Medalists
Gold medal	Linda Jezek, Tracy Caulkins, Jill Sterkel and Cynthia Woodhead	United States
Silver medal	Cheryl Gibson, Ann Gagnon, Nancy Garapick and Gail Amundrud	Canada
Bronze medal	Teresa Rivera, Elke Holtz, Helen Plachinski and Inez Guerrero	Mexico

The women's 4 × 100 metre medley relay competition of the swimming events at the 1979 Pan American Games took place on 2 July at the Piscina Olimpica Del Escambron. The last Pan American Games champion was the United States.

== Results ==
All times are shown in minutes and seconds.

KEY:	q	Fastest non-qualifiers	Q	Qualified	GR	Games record	NR	National record	PB	Personal best	SB	Seasonal best

=== Final ===
The final was held on July 2.

Rank	Name	Nationality	Time	Notes
1st place, gold medalist(s)	Linda Jezek (1:03.56); Tracy Caulkins (1:13.47); Jill Sterkel (1:00.44); Cynthia Woodhead (55.77)	United States	4:13.24	NR, GR
2nd place, silver medalist(s)	Cheryl Gibson (1:05.18); Ann Gagnon (1:13.78); Nancy Garapick (58.51); Gail Amundrud (1:02.69)	Canada	4:20.16	
3rd place, bronze medalist(s)	Teresa Rivera (1:06.85) NR; Elke Holtz (1:16.54); Helen Plachinski (1:06.46); Inez Guerrero (1:00.74)	Mexico	4:30.59	NR
4	Laura Laguna (1:11.89); Alicia Boscatto (1:16.32); Rosanna Juncos (1:05.42); Vera Sanchero (1:00.68)	Argentina	4:34.31	NR
5	Rosamaria Prado (1:09.27); Maria Matta (1:17.44); Maria Guimarães (1:06.82); Flávia Nadalutti (1:01.74)	Brazil	4:35.27	
6	Penny Blakeman (1:13.19); Vilma Aguilera (1:19.12); Lisa Escalera (1:10.15); Sonia Acosta (1:01.40)	Puerto Rico	4:43.86	NR
7	- - - -	-	-	
8	- - - -	-	-	
