= Swimming at the 1979 Pan American Games – Women's 200 metre backstroke =

Women's 200 metre backstroke at the 1979 Pan American Games
- Venue: Piscina Olimpica Del Escambron
- Dates: July 6 (preliminaries and finals)
- Competitors: from - nations

Medalists
Gold medal	Linda Jezek	United States
Silver medal	Cheryl Gibson	Canada
Bronze medal	Libby Kinkead	United States

The women's 200 metre backstroke competition of the swimming events at the 1979 Pan American Games took place on 6 July at the Piscina Olimpica Del Escambron. The last Pan American Games champion was Donna Wennerstrom of US.

This race consisted of four lengths of the pool, all in backstroke.

== Results ==
All times are in minutes and seconds.

KEY:	q	Fastest non-qualifiers	Q	Qualified	GR	Games record	NR	National record	PB	Personal best	SB	Seasonal best

=== Heats ===
The first round was held on July 6.

Rank	Name	Nationality	Time	Notes
1	Linda Jezek	United States	2:20.17	Q
2	Libby Kinkead	United States	2:20.43	Q
3	Suzanne Kwasny	Canada	2:24.39	Q
4	Cheryl Gibson	Canada	2:25.14	Q
5	Teresa Rivera	Mexico	2:26.39	Q
6	Rosamaria Prado	Brazil	2:29.42	Q
7	Hilda Huerta	Mexico	2:29.74	Q
8	Laura Laguna	Argentina	2:34.37	Q
9	Penny Blakeman	Puerto Rico	2:37.49	
10	Sandra Revette	Venezuela	2:37.68	
11	Alba Izcoa	Puerto Rico	2:43.52	
12	Silvana Barbato	Uruguay	2:44.93	

=== Final ===
The final was held on July 6.

Rank	Name	Nationality	Time	Notes
1st place, gold medalist(s)	Linda Jezek	United States	2:16.07	NR, GR
2nd place, silver medalist(s)	Cheryl Gibson	Canada	2:17.58	
3rd place, bronze medalist(s)	Libby Kinkead	United States	2:20.19	
4	Suzanne Kwasny	Canada	2:23.79	
5	Teresa Rivera	Mexico	2:24.42	NR
6	Rosamaria Prado	Brazil	2:28.03	
7	Hilda Huerta	Mexico	2:30.10	
8	Laura Laguna	Argentina	2:33.64	
