= Swimming at the 1984 Summer Olympics – Women's 400 metre individual medley =

Women's 400 metre individual medley at the Games of the XXIII Olympiad
- Venue: McDonald's Olympic Swim Stadium
- Date: 29 July 1984 (heats & final)
- Competitors: 20 from 14 nations
- Winning time: 4:39.24 AM

Medalists
1st place, gold medalist(s)		Tracy Caulkins	United States
2nd place, silver medalist(s)		Suzie Landells	Australia
3rd place, bronze medalist(s)		Petra Zindler	West Germany

The final of the women's 400 metre individual medley event at the 1984 Summer Olympics was held in the McDonald's Olympic Swim Stadium in Los Angeles, California, on July 29, 1984. 20 athletes competed in the heats, with the eight fastest qualifying for the final.

== Records ==
Prior to this competition, the existing world and Olympic records were as follows.

World record	Petra Schneider (GDR)	4:36.10	Guayaquil, Ecuador	1 August 1982
Olympic record	Petra Schneider (GDR)	4:36.29	Moscow, Soviet Union	26 July 1980

== Results ==
=== Heats ===
Rule: The eight fastest swimmers advance to final A (Q), while the next eight to final B (q).

Rank	Heat	Lane	Name	Nationality	Time	Notes
1	3	4	Tracy Caulkins	United States	4:44.42	Q
2	2	4	Sue Heon	United States	4:51.32	Q
3	2	3	Nathalie Gingras	Canada	4:51.77	Q
4	1	4	Petra Zindler	West Germany	4:52.49	Q
5	2	5	Kathrine Bomstad	Norway	4:52.74	Q
6	1	5	Donna McGinnis	Canada	4:53.30	Q
7	1	3	Gaynor Stanley	Great Britain	4:53.70	Q
8	3	5	Suzie Landells	Australia	4:54.13	Q
9	3	6	Roberta Felotti	Italy	4:54.14	q
10	3	7	Karen Phillips	Australia	4:54.28	q
11	1	6	Sofia Kraft	Sweden	4:55.10	q
12	3	3	Sarah Hardcastle	Great Britain	4:55.78	q
13	2	2	Sonja Hausladen	Austria	4:58.68	q
14	1	2	Hideka Koshimizu	Japan	4:59.18	q
15	3	2	Gail Jonson	New Zealand	4:59.92	q
16	2	6	Anca Pătrășcoiu	Romania	5:03.97	q, NR
17	2	7	Monika Bayer	Austria	5:05.61	
18	2	1	Karin Brandes	Peru	5:11.92	
	1	7	Beda Leirvaag	Norway	DNS	
	4	1	Faten Ghattas	Tunisia	DNS	

=== Finals ===
==== Final B ====
Rank	Lane	Name	Nationality	Time	Notes
9	6	Sarah Hardcastle	Great Britain	4:51.55	
10	3	Sofia Kraft	Sweden	4:53.25	NR
11	5	Karen Phillips	Australia	4:53.37	
12	4	Roberta Felotti	Italy	4:57.74	
13	2	Sonja Hausladen	Austria	4:57.78	NR
14	7	Hideka Koshimizu	Japan	4:58.02	NR
15	1	Gail Jonson	New Zealand	4:58.40	
16	8	Anca Pătrășcoiu	Romania	5:05.53	

==== Final A ====
Rank	Lane	Name	Nationality	Time	Notes
1st place, gold medalist(s)	4	Tracy Caulkins	United States	4:39.24	AM
2nd place, silver medalist(s)	8	Suzie Landells	Australia	4:48.30	OC
3rd place, bronze medalist(s)	6	Petra Zindler	West Germany	4:48.57	
4	5	Sue Heon	United States	4:49.41	
5	3	Nathalie Gingras	Canada	4:50.55	
6	7	Donna McGinnis	Canada	4:50.65	
7	1	Gaynor Stanley	Great Britain	4:52.83	
8	2	Kathrine Bomstad	Norway	4:53.28	
