= Swimming at the 1983 Pan American Games – Women's 200 metre freestyle =

Women's 200 metre freestyle at the 1983 Pan American Games
- Venue: -
- Dates: August 18 (preliminaries and finals)
- Competitors: from - nations

Medalists
Gold medal	Carrie Steinseifer	United States
Silver medal	Mary Wayte	United States
Bronze medal	Julie Daigneault	Canada

The women's 200 metre freestyle competition of the swimming events at the 1983 Pan American Games took place on 18 August. The last Pan American Games champion was Cynthia Woodhead of the United States.

This race consisted of four lengths of the pool in freestyle.

== Results ==
All times are in minutes and seconds.

KEY:	q	Fastest non-qualifiers	Q	Qualified	GR	Games record	NR	National record	PB	Personal best	SB	Seasonal best

=== Final ===
The final was held on August 18.

Rank	Name	Nationality	Time	Notes
1st place, gold medalist(s)	Carrie Steinseifer	United States	2:01.33	
2nd place, silver medalist(s)	Mary Wayte	United States	2:02.21	
3rd place, bronze medalist(s)	Julie Daigneault	Canada	2:02.36	
4	Jane Kerr	Canada	2:05.16	
5	Shelley Cramer	U.S. Virgin Islands	2:09.16	
6	Paula Amorim	Brazil	2:10.10	
7	Sandra Crousse	Peru	2:10.33	
8	Patricia Bartiett	Trinidad and Tobago	2:10.96	NR
