= Swimming at the 1979 Pan American Games – Women's 100 metre backstroke =

Women's 100 metre backstroke at the 1979 Pan American Games
- Venue: Piscina Olimpica Del Escambron
- Dates: July 3 (preliminaries and finals)
- Competitors: from - nations

Medalists
Gold medal	Linda Jezek	United States
Silver medal	Cheryl Gibson	Canada
Bronze medal	Teresa Rivera	Mexico

The women's 100 metre backstroke competition of the swimming events at the 1979 Pan American Games took place on 3 July at the Piscina Olimpica Del Escambron. The last Pan American Games champion was Lynn Chénard of Canada.

This race consisted of two lengths of the pool, all in backstroke.

== Results ==
All times are in minutes and seconds.

KEY:	q	Fastest non-qualifiers	Q	Qualified	GR	Games record	NR	National record	PB	Personal best	SB	Seasonal best

=== Heats ===
The first round was held on July 3.

Rank	Name	Nationality	Time	Notes
1	Linda Jezek	United States	1:04.53	Q
2	Kim Carlisle	United States	1:05.06	Q
3	Cheryl Gibson	Canada	1:06.23	Q
4	Teresa Rivera	Mexico	1:08.22	Q
5	Melinda Copp	Canada	1:08.88	Q
6	Maria Paris	Costa Rica	1:09.64	Q
7	Rosamaria Prado	Brazil	1:09.73	Q
8	Hilda Huerta	Mexico	1:10.43	Q
9	Laura Laguna	Argentina	1:12.00	
10	Penny Blakeman	Puerto Rico	1:13.20	
11	Sandra Revette	Venezuela	1:13.40	NR
12	Rita Neves	Brazil	1:13.42	
13	Silvana Barbato	Uruguay	1:15.97	
14	Alba Izcoa	Puerto Rico	1:16.00	

=== Final ===
The final was held on July 3.

Rank	Name	Nationality	Time	Notes
1st place, gold medalist(s)	Linda Jezek	United States	1:03.33	NR, GR
2nd place, silver medalist(s)	Cheryl Gibson	Canada	1:05.17	
3rd place, bronze medalist(s)	Teresa Rivera	Mexico	1:06.86	NR
4	Melinda Copp	Canada	1:07.81	
5	Linda Huerta	Mexico	1:09.45	
6	Rosamaria Prado	Brazil	1:09.57	
7	Maria Paris	Costa Rica	1:09.99	
8	Kim Carlisle	United States	DQ	
