= Swimming at the 1979 Pan American Games – Women's 100 metre freestyle =

Women's 100 metre freestyle at the 1979 Pan American Games
- Venue: Piscina Olimpica Del Escambron
- Dates: July 8 (preliminaries and finals)
- Competitors: from - nations

Medalists
Gold medal	Cynthia Woodhead	United States
Silver medal	Jill Sterkel	United States
Bronze medal	Gail Amundrud	Canada

The women's 100 metre freestyle competition of the swimming events at the 1979 Pan American Games took place on 8 July at the Piscina Olimpica Del Escambron. The last Pan American Games champion was Kim Peyton of US.

This race consisted of two lengths of the pool, both lengths being in freestyle.

== Results ==
All times are in minutes and seconds.

KEY:	q	Fastest non-qualifiers	Q	Qualified	GR	Games record	NR	National record	PB	Personal best	SB	Seasonal best

=== Heats ===
The first round was held on July 8.

Rank	Name	Nationality	Time	Notes
1	Cynthia Woodhead	United States	57.31	Q
2	Jill Sterkel	United States	58.74	Q
3	Gail Amundrud	Canada	58.97	Q
4	Anne Jardin	Canada	59.30	Q
5	Maria Paris	Costa Rica	1:00.49	Q
6	Shelley Cramer	U.S. Virgin Islands	1:00.57	Q
7	Vilma Aguilera	Puerto Rico	1:00.68	Q
8	Sonia Acosta	Puerto Rico	1:00.74	Q
9	Helen Plachinski	Mexico	1:00.92	
10	Teresa Rivera	Mexico	1:01.34	
11	Rosanna Juncos	Argentina	1:01.65	
12	Virginia Sachero	Argentina	1:01.85	
13	Julia Vicioso	Dominican Republic	1:02.30	NR
14	Maria Guimarães	Brazil	1:02.71	
15	Maria Vieira	Brazil	1:03.06	

=== Final ===
The final was held on July 8.

Rank	Name	Nationality	Time	Notes
1st place, gold medalist(s)	Cynthia Woodhead	United States	56.22	NR, GR
2nd place, silver medalist(s)	Jill Sterkel	United States	56.24	
3rd place, bronze medalist(s)	Gail Amundrud	Canada	57.79	
4	Anne Jardin	Canada	58.06	
5	Shelley Cramer	U.S. Virgin Islands	59.68	NR
6	Maria Paris	Costa Rica	59.82	NR
7	Vilma Aguilera	Puerto Rico	59.90	NR
8	Sonia Acosta	Puerto Rico	1:00.19	
