= Swimming at the 1987 Pan American Games – Women's 800 metre freestyle =

Women's 800 metre freestyle at the 1987 Pan American Games
- Venue: Indiana University Natatorium
- Dates: August 14 (preliminaries and finals)
- Competitors: from - nations

Medalists
Gold medal	Tami Bruce	United States
Silver medal	Deborah Babashoff	United States
Bronze medal	Megan Holliday	Canada

The women's 800 metre freestyle competition of the swimming events at the 1987 Pan American Games took place on 14 August at the Indiana University Natatorium. The last Pan American Games champion was Tiffany Cohen of US.

This race consisted of sixteen lengths of the pool, all in freestyle.

== Results ==
All times are in minutes and seconds.

KEY:	q	Fastest non-qualifiers	Q	Qualified	GR	Games record	NR	National record	PB	Personal best	SB	Seasonal best

=== Final ===
The final was held on August 14.

Rank	Name	Nationality	Time	Notes
1st place, gold medalist(s)	Tami Bruce	United States	8:34.72	GR
2nd place, silver medalist(s)	Deborah Babashoff	United States	8:42.77	
3rd place, bronze medalist(s)	Megan Holliday	Canada	8:52.60	
4	Jolene Cowan	Canada	8:55.40	
5	Patrícia Amorim	Brazil	9:03.95	
6	Brendali Sierra	Puerto Rico	9:18.56	
7	Miriam Artur	Brazil	9:25.80	
8	-	-	-	
