= Swimming at the 1979 Pan American Games – Women's 400 metre individual medley =

Women's 400 metre individual medley at the 1979 Pan American Games
- Venue: Piscina Olimpica Del Escambron
- Dates: July 5 (preliminaries and finals)
- Competitors: from - nations

Medalists
Gold medal	Tracy Caulkins	United States
Silver medal	Anne Tweedy	United States
Bronze medal	Nancy Garapick	Canada

The women's 400 metre individual medley competition of the swimming events at the 1979 Pan American Games took place on 5 July at the Piscina Olimpica Del Escambron. The last Pan American Games champion was Kathy Heddy of US.

This race consisted of eight lengths of the pool. The first two lengths were swum using the butterfly stroke, the second pair with the backstroke, the third pair of lengths in breaststroke, and the final two were freestyle.

== Results ==
All times are in minutes and seconds.

KEY:	q	Fastest non-qualifiers	Q	Qualified	GR	Games record	NR	National record	PB	Personal best	SB	Seasonal best

=== Heats ===
The first round was held on July 5.

Rank	Name	Nationality	Time	Notes
1	Anne Tweedy	United States	4:58.53	Q
2	Tracy Caulkins	United States	4:59.73	Q
3	Nancy Garapick	Canada	5:00.92	Q
4	Cheryl Gibson	Canada	5:05.36	Q
5	Elke Holtz	Mexico	5:12.46	Q
6	Rosamaria Prado	Brazil	5:12.79	Q
7	Yolanda Mendiola	Mexico	5:14.94	Q
8	Virginia Andreatta	Brazil	5:19.65	Q
9	Maria Perez	Venezuela	5:19.72	NR
10	Georgina Osorio	Panama	5:21.28	NR
11	Lisa Escalera	Puerto Rico	5:28.11	
12	Linda Miranda	Puerto Rico	5:48.51	

=== Final ===
The final was held on July 5.

Rank	Name	Nationality	Time	Notes
1st place, gold medalist(s)	Tracy Caulkins	United States	4:46.05	NR, GR
2nd place, silver medalist(s)	Anne Tweedy	United States	4:47.19	
3rd place, bronze medalist(s)	Nancy Garapick	Canada	4:53.37	
4	Cheryl Gibson	Canada	4:59.54	
5	Elke Holtz	Mexico	5:08.78	NR
6	Rosamaria Prado	Brazil	5:10.81	
7	Virginia Andreatta	Brazil	5:16.01	
8	Yolanda Mendiola	Mexico	5:18.16	
