= Jill Horstead =

Canadian swimmer (born 1967)

Personal information
- Full name: Jill C. Horstead
- National team: Canada
- Born: May 1, 1967 (age 59) Toronto, Ontario, Canada
- Height: 1.70 m (5 ft 7 in)

Sport
- Sport: Swimming
- Strokes: Butterfly
- Club: Etobicoke Swim Club
- College team: University of Florida
Medal record
Women's swimming
Representing Canada
Commonwealth Games
Bronze medal – third place	1986 Edinburgh	200 m butterfly
Pan Pacific Championships
Bronze medal – third place	1985 Tokyo	200 m butterfly

Jill C. Horstead (born May 1, 1967) is a former competitive swimmer who represented Canada in international events during the 1980s.

== Competitive career ==
As a 16-year-old at the 1983 Pan American Games in Caracas, Venezuela, she placed fourth in the 200-metre butterfly with a time of 2:17.13, finishing behind Mary T. Meagher, Tracy Caulkins and Marie Moore. She won a bronze medal in the 200-metre butterfly at the 1985 Pan Pacific Swimming Championships in Tokyo (time: 2:13.46), and another bronze in the 200-metre butterfly at the 1986 Commonwealth Games in Edinburgh (time: 2:14.53).

Horstead competed in the 1984 Summer Olympics in Los Angeles, where she advanced to the B Final of the women's 200-metre butterfly, clocking a time of 2:13.49 and finishing first in the B Final consolation heat (ninth overall).

Horstead later attended the University of Florida in Gainesville, Florida, and swam for coach Randy Reese's Florida Gators swimming and diving team in National Collegiate Athletic Association (NCAA) and Southeastern Conference (SEC) competition from 1987 to 1990. During her college swimming career, she earned All-American honors in the 200-yard butterfly and the 400-yard medley relay. She graduated from the University of Florida with bachelor's and master's degrees in accounting in 1990 and 1991, respectively.

== Personal life ==
Horstead and her husband Greg McIntosh have two daughters, Brooke McIntosh (born January 5, 2005) and Summer McIntosh (born August 18, 2006), both successful athletes in their own right. Brooke, a pairs skater, competed at the 2020 Winter Youth Olympics and won the bronze medal at the 2022 World Junior Figure Skating Championships. Summer followed in her mother's footsteps as a swimmer, competing at the 2020 and 2024 Summer Olympics, at the latter winning three gold medals, including in her mother's favoured discipline, the 200 m butterfly.

== See also ==
- List of University of Florida alumni
- List of University of Florida Olympians
