= Swimming at the 1979 Pan American Games – Women's 200 metre individual medley =

Women's 200 metre individual medley at the 1979 Pan American Games
- Venue: Piscina Olimpica Del Escambron
- Dates: July 2 (preliminaries and finals)
- Competitors: from - nations

Medalists
Gold medal	Tracy Caulkins	United States
Silver medal	Nancy Garapick	Canada
Bronze medal	Anne Tweedy	United States

The women's 200 metre individual medley competition of the swimming events at the 1979 Pan American Games took place on 2 July at the Piscina Olimpica Del Escambron. The last Pan American Games champion was Kathy Heddy of the United States.

This race consisted of four lengths of the pool, one each in backstroke, breaststroke, butterfly and freestyle swimming.

== Results ==
All times are shown in minutes and seconds.

KEY:	q	Fastest non-qualifiers	Q	Qualified	GR	Games record	NR	National record	PB	Personal best	SB	Seasonal best

=== Heats ===
The first round was held on July 2.

Rank	Name	Nationality	Time	Notes
1	Tracy Caulkins	United States	2:21.29	Q
2	Nancy Garapick	Canada	2:21.89	Q
3	Anne Tweedy	United States	2:22.43	Q
4	Joann Baker	Canada	2:23.73	Q
5	Elke Holtz	Mexico	2:25.74	Q, NR
6	Rosanna Juncos	Argentina	2:28.01	Q
7	Maria Paris	Costa Rica	2:28.48	Q
8	Yolanda Mendiola	Mexico	2:29.97	Q
9	Vilma Aguilera	Puerto Rico	2:30.33	NR
10	Lisa Escalera	Puerto Rico	2:32.11	
11	Shelley Cramer	U.S. Virgin Islands	2:32.96	NR
12	Agnes Nilsson	Brazil	2:34.10	
13	Georgina Osorio	Panama	2:35.50	NR
14	Rita Neves	Brazil	2:37.63	
15	Georgetti Ednes	Bermuda	2:42.99	NR

=== Final ===
The final was held on July 2.

Rank	Name	Nationality	Time	Notes
1st place, gold medalist(s)	Tracy Caulkins	United States	2:16.11	NR, GR
2nd place, silver medalist(s)	Nancy Garapick	Canada	2:19.36	
3rd place, bronze medalist(s)	Anne Tweedy	United States	2:20.33	
4	Joann Baker	Canada	2:20.83	
5	Elke Holtz	Mexico	2:26.13	
6	Maria Paris	Costa Rica	2:26.54	NR
7	Rosanna Juncos	Argentina	2:27.71	NR
8	Yolanda Mendiola	Mexico	2:30.80	
