= Swimming at the 1979 Pan American Games – Women's 100 metre butterfly =

Women's 100 metre butterfly at the 1979 Pan American Games
- Venue: Piscina Olimpica Del Escambron
- Dates: July 5 (preliminaries and finals)
- Competitors: from - nations

Medalists
Gold medal	Jill Sterkel	United States
Silver medal	Lisa Buese	United States
Bronze medal	Nancy Garapick	Canada

The Women's 100m Butterfly competition of the swimming events at the 1979 Pan American Games took place on 5 July at the Piscina Olimpica Del Escambron in San Juan, Puerto Rico. The last Pan American Games champion was Camille Wright of US.

This race consisted of two lengths of the pool, all in butterfly.

== Results ==
All times are in minutes and seconds.

KEY:	q	Fastest non-qualifiers	Q	Qualified	GR	Games record	NR	National record	PB	Personal best	SB	Seasonal best

=== Heats ===
The first round was held on July 5.

Rank	Name	Nationality	Time	Notes
1	Lisa Buese	United States	1:01.56	Q
2	Jill Sterkel	United States	1:02.12	Q
3	Maria Paris	Costa Rica	1:03.44	Q
4	Susan Sloan	Canada	1:03.51	Q
5	Nancy Garapick	Canada	1:04.14	Q
6	Shelley Cramer	U.S. Virgin Islands	1:04.45	Q
7	Rosanna Juncos	Argentina	1:04.94	Q
8	Adriana Pereira	Brazil	1:06.55	Q
9	Maria Hung	Venezuela	1:07.97	NR
10	Maria Guimarães	Brazil	1:08.27	
11	Helen Plachinski	Mexico	1:08.92	
12	Sandra Revette	Venezuela	1:09.55	
13	Sonia Acosta	Puerto Rico	1:10.11	NR
14	Lisa Escalera	Puerto Rico	1:11.19	
15	Julia Vicioso	Dominican Republic	1:15.44	

=== Final ===
The final was held on July 5.

Rank	Name	Nationality	Time	Notes
1st place, gold medalist(s)	Jill Sterkel	United States	1:00.53	NR, GR
2nd place, silver medalist(s)	Lisa Buese	United States	1:00.59	
3rd place, bronze medalist(s)	Nancy Garapick	Canada	1:02.96	
4	Shelley Cramer	U.S. Virgin Islands	1:03.51	NR
5	Susan Sloan	Canada	1:03.52	
6	Maria Paris	Costa Rica	1:03.58	
7	Rosanna Juncos	Argentina	1:04.75	
8	Adriana Pereira	Brazil	1:06.79	
