= Swimming at the 1987 Pan American Games – Women's 200 metre backstroke =

Women's 200 metre backstroke at the 1987 Pan American Games
- Venue: Indiana University Natatorium
- Dates: August 15 (preliminaries and finals)
- Competitors: from - nations

Medalists
Gold medal	Katie Welch	United States
Silver medal	Silvia Poll	Costa Rica
Bronze medal	Holly Green	United States

The women's 200 metre backstroke competition of the swimming events at the 1987 Pan American Games took place on 15 August at the Indiana University Natatorium. The last Pan American Games champion was Amy White of US.

This race consisted of four lengths of the pool, all in backstroke.

== Results ==
All times are in minutes and seconds.

KEY:	q	Fastest non-qualifiers	Q	Qualified	GR	Games record	NR	National record	PB	Personal best	SB	Seasonal best

=== Final ===
The final was held on August 15.

Rank	Name	Nationality	Time	Notes
1st place, gold medalist(s)	Katie Welch	United States	2:13.65	GR
2nd place, silver medalist(s)	Silvia Poll	Costa Rica	2:14.18	NR
3rd place, bronze medalist(s)	Holly Green	United States	2:14.75	
4	Manon Simard	Canada	2:18.80	
5	Anne-Marie Andersen	Canada	2:22.70	
6	Rita Garay	Puerto Rico	2:23.07	
7	Cristiane Santos	Brazil	2:26.43	
8	Teresa Rivera	Mexico	2:27.84	
