= Swimming at the 1976 Summer Olympics – Women's 400 metre individual medley =

Women's 400 metre individual medley at the Games of the XXI Olympiad
- Venue: Olympic Pool, Montreal
- Date: 24 July 1976 (heats & final)
- Competitors: 20 from 9 nations
- Winning time: 4:42.77 WR

Medalists
1st place, gold medalist(s)		Ulrike Tauber	East Germany
2nd place, silver medalist(s)		Cheryl Gibson	Canada
3rd place, bronze medalist(s)		Becky Smith	Canada

The women's 400 metre individual medley event for the 1976 Summer Olympics was held in Montreal on 24 July. All swimmers in the final would have won the 1972 final in this event. Ulrike Tauber won in a new world-record time.

== Results ==
=== Heats ===
Heat 1

Rank	Athlete	Country	Time	Notes
1	Becky Smith	Canada	4:52.90	Q, OR
2	Judith Hudson	Australia	5:00.25	
3	Anne Adams	Great Britain	5:09.60	
4	Ann Bradshaw	Great Britain	5:10.82	
5	Allison Smith	Australia	5:17.51	
6	Nancy Deano	Philippines	5:34.89	

Heat 2

Rank	Athlete	Country	Time	Notes
1	Donnalee Wennerstrom	United States	4:55.16	Q
2	Sabine Kahle	East Germany	4:56.85	Q
3	Lynne Rowe	New Zealand	5:09.21	
4	Nataliya Popova	Soviet Union	5:15.75	

Heat 3

Rank	Athlete	Country	Time	Notes
1	Ulrike Tauber	East Germany	4:51.24	Q, OR
2	Cheryl Gibson	Canada	4:55.30	Q
3	Monique Rodahl	New Zealand	4:58.47	Q
4	Susan Richardson	Great Britain	5:06.39	
5	Jeanne Haney	United States	5:10.53	
6	Pierrette Michel	Belgium	5:15.86	

Heat 4

Rank	Athlete	Country	Time	Notes
1	Birgit Treiber	East Germany	4:57.39	Q
2	Joann Baker	Canada	4:58.86	Q
3	Susan Hunter	New Zealand	5:03.82	
4	Colette Crabbe	Belgium	5:06.87	

=== Final ===
Rank	Athlete	Country	Time	Notes
1	Ulrike Tauber	East Germany	4:42.77	WR
2	Cheryl Gibson	Canada	4:48.10	
3	Becky Smith	Canada	4:50.48	
4	Birgit Treiber	East Germany	4:52.40	
5	Sabine Kahle	East Germany	4:53.50	
6	Donnalee Wennerstrom	United States	4:55.34	
7	Joann Baker	Canada	5:00.19	
8	Monique Rodahl	New Zealand	5:00.21	
