= Swimming at the 1979 Pan American Games – Women's 200 metre freestyle =

Women's 200 metre freestyle at the 1979 Pan American Games
- Venue: Piscina Olimpica Del Escambron
- Dates: July 3 (preliminaries and finals)
- Competitors: from - nations

Medalists
Gold medal	Cynthia Woodhead	United States
Silver medal	Kim Linehan	United States
Bronze medal	Gail Amundrud	Canada

The Women's 200m Freestyle competition of the swimming events at the 1979 Pan American Games took place on 3 July at the Piscina Olimpica Del Escambron in San Juan, Puerto Rico. The last Pan American Games champion was Kim Peyton of the United States.

This race consisted of four lengths of the pool, all in freestyle.

== Results ==
All times are shown in minutes and seconds.

KEY:	q	Fastest non-qualifiers	Q	Qualified	GR	Games record	NR	National record	PB	Personal best	SB	Seasonal best

=== Heats ===
The first round was held on July 3.

Rank	Name	Nationality	Time	Notes
1	Cynthia Woodhead	United States	2:04.14	Q
2	Kim Linehan	United States	2:04.60	Q
3	Anne Jardin	Canada	2:05.66	Q
4	Gail Amundrud	Canada	2:06.42	Q
5	Shelley Cramer	U.S. Virgin Islands	2:08.52	Q
6	Maria Guimarães	Brazil	2:11.27	Q
7	Andrea Neumayer	Argentina	2:11.79	Q
8	Maria Perez	Venezuela	2:13.91	Q
9	Sonia Acosta	Puerto Rico	2:13.93	
10	Monica Ramirez	Mexico	2:14.85	
11	Maria Vieira	Brazil	2:14.85	
12	Genevieve Hernandez	Puerto Rico	2:15.39	
13	Georgina Osorio	Panama	2:15.91	
14	Julia Vicioso	Dominican Republic	2:18.38	NR

=== Final ===
The final was held on July 3.

Rank	Name	Nationality	Time	Notes
1st place, gold medalist(s)	Cynthia Woodhead	United States	1:58.43	WR
2nd place, silver medalist(s)	Kim Linehan	United States	2:01.92	
3rd place, bronze medalist(s)	Gail Amundrud	Canada	2:03.38	
4	Anne Jardin	Canada	2:04.37	
5	Shelley Cramer	U.S. Virgin Islands	2:07.38	NR
6	Maria Guimarães	Brazil	2:10.49	
7	Andrea Neumayer	Argentina	2:10.61	NR
8	Maria Perez	Venezuela	2:13.80	
