= Swimming at the 1983 Pan American Games – Women's 800 metre freestyle =

Women's 800 metre freestyle at the 1983 Pan American Games
- Venue: -
- Dates: August 21 (preliminaries and finals)
- Competitors: from - nations

Medalists
Gold medal	Tiffany Cohen	United States
Silver medal	Marybeth Linzmeier	United States
Bronze medal	Julie Daigneault	Canada

The women's 800 metre freestyle competition of the swimming events at the 1983 Pan American Games took place on 21 August. The last Pan American Games champion was Kim Linehan of the United States.

This race consisted of sixteen lengths of the pool, all in freestyle.

== Results ==
All times are in minutes and seconds.

KEY:	q	Fastest non-qualifiers	Q	Qualified	GR	Games record	NR	National record	PB	Personal best	SB	Seasonal best

=== Final ===
The final was held on August 21.

Rank	Name	Nationality	Time	Notes
1st place, gold medalist(s)	Tiffany Cohen	United States	8:35.42	GR
2nd place, silver medalist(s)	Marybeth Linzmeier	United States	8:41.26	
3rd place, bronze medalist(s)	Julie Daigneault	Canada	8:59.82	
4	Sandra Honour	Canada	9:08.14	
5	Irma Huerta	Mexico	9:10.86	
6	Isabel Miranda	Brazil	9:13.83	NR
7	Amalia Llorca	Venezuela	9:20.20	NR
8	Maria Cuesta	Cuba	9:22.50	NR
