= Swimming at the 1983 Pan American Games – Women's 200 metre butterfly =

Women's 200 metre butterfly at the 1983 Pan American Games
- Venue: -
- Dates: August 22 (preliminaries and finals)
- Competitors: from - nations

Medalists
Gold medal	Mary T. Meagher	United States
Silver medal	Tracy Caulkins	United States
Bronze medal	Marie Moore	Canada

The women's 200 metre butterfly competition of the swimming events at the 1983 Pan American Games took place on 22 August. The last Pan American Games champion was Mary T. Meagher of US.

This race consisted of four lengths of the pool, all lengths being in butterfly stroke.

== Results ==
All times are in minutes and seconds.

KEY:	q	Fastest non-qualifiers	Q	Qualified	GR	Games record	NR	National record	PB	Personal best	SB	Seasonal best

=== Final ===
The final was held on August 22.

Rank	Name	Nationality	Time	Notes
1st place, gold medalist(s)	Mary T. Meagher	United States	2:10.06	
2nd place, silver medalist(s)	Tracy Caulkins	United States	2:14.15	
3rd place, bronze medalist(s)	Marie Moore	Canada	2:14.51	
4	Jill Horstead	Canada	2:17.13	
5	Jodie Lawaetz	U.S. Virgin Islands	2:22.67	
6	Sandra Bohorquez	Colombia	2:22.95	NR
7	Amalia Llorca	Venezuela	2:23.29	
8	Sandra Revette	Venezuela	2:25.16	
