= Kwaśny =

Kwaśny, feminine: Kwaśna is surname of:

- Dorota Kwaśna (born 1972), Polish cross country skier
- Mary Kwasny (née Morrissey), American biostatistician
- Joanna Nowicka (née Kwaśna; born 1966), Polish archer
- Suzanne Kwasny
- Ursula Kwasny (born 1952), German politician
- Zdzisław Kwaśny (born 1960), Polish hammer thrower
