= Swimming at the 1983 Pan American Games – Women's 200 metre individual medley =

Women's 200 metre individual medley at the 1983 Pan American Games
- Venue: -
- Dates: August 21 (preliminaries and finals)
- Competitors: from - nations

Medalists
Gold medal	Tracy Caulkins	United States
Silver medal	Michelle MacPherson	Canada
Bronze medal	Susan Rapp	United States

The women's 200 metre individual medley competition of the swimming events at the 1983 Pan American Games took place on 21 August. The last Pan American Games champion was Tracy Caulkins of the United States.

This race consisted of four lengths of the pool, one each in backstroke, breaststroke, butterfly, and freestyle swimming.

== Results ==
All times are in minutes and seconds.

KEY:	q	Fastest non-qualifiers	Q	Qualified	GR	Games record	NR	National record	PB	Personal best	SB	Seasonal best

=== Final ===
The final was held on August 21.

Rank	Name	Nationality	Time	Notes
1st place, gold medalist(s)	Tracy Caulkins	United States	2:16.22	
2nd place, silver medalist(s)	Michelle MacPherson	Canada	2:18.22	
3rd place, bronze medalist(s)	Susan Rapp	United States	2:18.76	
4	Kathy Bald	Canada	2:19.48	
5	Karen Brandes	Peru	2:26.14	NR
6	Miriam Sacco	Venezuela	2:26.35	NR
7	Sandra Bohorquez	Colombia	2:31.91	NR
8	Vilma Aguilera	Puerto Rico	2:32.08	
