= Michele Richardson =

American swimmer (born 1969)

Personal information
- Full name: Michele Richardson Armengol
- National team: United States
- Born: April 28, 1969 (age 57) Managua, Nicaragua
- Height: 5 ft 8 in (1.73 m)
- Weight: 116 lb (53 kg)

Sport
- Sport: Swimming
- Strokes: Freestyle
- College team: Clemson University
Medal record
Women's swimming
Representing the United States
Olympic Games
Silver medal – second place	1984 Los Angeles	800 m freestyle

Michele Richardson Armengol (born April 28, 1969) is an American former competition swimmer and Olympic silver medalist. Born in Managua, Nicaragua, she represented the United States as a 15-year-old at the 1984 Summer Olympics in Los Angeles. She won a silver medal in the women's 800-meter freestyle, finishing second in 8:30.73, behind American teammate Tiffany Cohen.

Both of Richardson's parents are American, and Richardson moved to the United States at the age of ten due to the Nicaraguan Revolution. Richardson initially wanted to represent Nicaragua in international competition, but was denied by the newly established government. Richardson is the sister of Frank Richardson, who swam for Nicaragua in international competition. Richardson swam for Clemson University from 1989 to 1992. She was the ACC champion in the 1650-yard freestyle in 1989. She is also of Cuban descent.

== See also ==
- List of Clemson University Olympians
- List of Olympic medalists in swimming (women)
