= Swimming at the 1983 Pan American Games – Women's 200 metre backstroke =

Women's 200 metre backstroke at the 1983 Pan American Games
- Venue: -
- Dates: August 22 (preliminaries and finals)
- Competitors: from - nations

Medalists
Gold medal	Amy White	United States
Silver medal	Susan Walsh	United States
Bronze medal	Barbara McBain	Canada

The women's 200 metre backstroke competition of the swimming events at the 1983 Pan American Games took place on 22 August. The last Pan American Games champion was Linda Jezek of US.

This race consisted of four lengths of the pool, all in backstroke.

== Results ==
All times are in minutes and seconds.

KEY:	q	Fastest non-qualifiers	Q	Qualified	GR	Games record	NR	National record	PB	Personal best	SB	Seasonal best

=== Final ===
The final was held on August 22.

Rank	Name	Nationality	Time	Notes
1st place, gold medalist(s)	Amy White	United States	2:15.66	GR
2nd place, silver medalist(s)	Susan Walsh	United States	2:15.94	
3rd place, bronze medalist(s)	Barbara McBain	Canada	2:18.93	
4	Michelle MacPherson	Canada	2:19.41	
5	Teresa Rivera	Mexico	2:25.82	
6	Karen Brands	Peru	2:26.01	NR
7	Sandra Barbato	Uruguay	2:33.29	
8	Jean Franseschi	Puerto Rico	2:34.86	
