= Monika Bayer =

Austrian swimmer

Personal information
- Born: 12 June 1967 (age 59)

Sport
- Sport: Swimming

Monika Bayer (born 12 June 1967) is an Austrian swimmer. She competed in the women's 400 metre individual medley at the 1984 Summer Olympics.
