= Sarah Hardcastle =

British swimmer (born 1969)

Personal information
- Full name: Sarah Lucy Hardcastle
- National team: Great Britain
- Born: 9 April 1969 (age 57) Chelmsford, England
- Height: 1.83 m (6 ft 0 in)
- Weight: 60 kg (132 lb; 9 st 6 lb)
- Relatives: Eve Thomas (daughter)

Sport
- Sport: Swimming
- Strokes: Freestyle, individual medley
- Club: BOSS
- Coach: Mike Higgs
Medal record
Women's swimming
Representing Great Britain
Olympic Games
Silver medal – second place	1984 Los Angeles	400 m freestyle
Bronze medal – third place	1984 Los Angeles	800 m freestyle
World Championships – Long Course
Bronze medal – third place	1986 Madrid	400 m freestyle
World Championships – Short Course
Gold medal – first place	1995 Rio de Janeiro	800 m freestyle
Bronze medal – third place	1995 Rio de Janeiro	400 m freestyle
European Championships – Long Course
Silver medal – second place	1985 Sofia	800 m freestyle
Bronze medal – third place	1983 Rome	800 m freestyle
Bronze medal – third place	1993 Sheffield	4×200 m freestyle
Representing England
Commonwealth Games
Gold medal – first place	1986 Edinburgh	400 m freestyle
Gold medal – first place	1986 Edinburgh	800 m freestyle
Silver medal – second place	1986 Edinburgh	4×200 m freestyle
Silver medal – second place	1994 Victoria	4×200 m freestyle
Bronze medal – third place	1986 Edinburgh	400 m medley
Bronze medal – third place	1994 Victoria	400 m freestyle

Sarah Lucy Hardcastle (born 9 April 1969), also known by her married name Sarah Thomas, is a British former competitive swimmer who represented Great Britain in the Olympics, world championships and European championships, and swam for England in the Commonwealth Games. She specialised in the 400- and 800-metre freestyle, and also competed in medley races. Hardcastle won multiple major championship medals over the course of her career, including individual silver and bronze medals at the 1984 Summer Olympics at the age of 15 and two individual gold medals at the 1986 Commonwealth Games. She retired from the sport in 1986 but returned in 1993, winning gold at the World Short Course Championships for the 800-metre freestyle in 1995 and reaching the final of the same event at the 1996 Summer Olympics.

== Career ==
Hardcastle finished second in the 800-metre freestyle at the British national championships in 1982, aged 13. She was selected for the England team at the 1982 Commonwealth Games in Brisbane, where she reached the final of the 800-metre freestyle. In 1983 she won the bronze medal in the 800-metre freestyle at the European Championships, aged 14.

At the 1984 Summer Olympics in Los Angeles, she became the youngest ever British woman to win an Olympic medal when she won silver in the 400-metre freestyle, aged 15 years, 3 months and 22 days. She also won bronze in the 800-metre freestyle, and finished ninth the 400-metre individual medley.

Hardcastle won the silver medal in the 800-metre freestyle and finished sixth in the 400-metre freestyle at the 1985 European Championships. At the 1986 Commonwealth Games, she won gold medals in both the 400- and 800-metre freestyle. Her time of 8:24.77 in the 800-metre freestyle was the second-fastest ever recorded, 0.15 seconds outside the world record held by Tracey Wickham, and a new European record. Her time in the 400-metre freestyle was a Commonwealth Games record. She also won bronze in the 400-metre individual medley, and was a member of the team that won silver in the 4×200-metre freestyle relay. She won the bronze medal in the 400-metre freestyle at the 1986 World Championships.

Hardcastle initially retired from competitive swimming in 1986 at the age of 17; in a 2012 interview she said that after years of training she had wanted to have a normal teenage life. She participated in Prince Edward's charity television special The Grand Knockout Tournament in 1987. After a spell working as a secretary at Ford, she decided to return to the sport in 1992 and resumed competing in 1993. Hardcastle was a member of the relay teams that won bronze in the 4×200-metre freestyle at the 1993 European Championships and silver at the 1994 Commonwealth Games, where she also won an individual bronze medal in the 400-metre freestyle. In 1995 she won the 800 m freestyle gold medal and bronze in the 400 m freestyle at the World Short Course Championships. At the 1996 Olympics in Atlanta she reached the final of the 800-metre freestyle, finishing eighth.

At the ASA National British Championships she is a five times winner of the 400 metres freestyle in (1984, 1986, 1993–1995) and four times winner of the 800 metres freestyle (1984, 1986, 1993 and 1995), in addition to being the champion over 400 metres medley in 1983 and 1986.

Hardcastle retired permanently from competitive swimming after the 1996 Olympics, later moving to New Zealand to work as a swimming coach.

== Personal life ==
Hardcastle was born in Chelmsford, Essex and attended Shoebury High School. Her mother, Ann Hardcastle, is a former swimming coach who taught several British elite swimmers including Mark Foster. Hardcastle married Lee Thomas in 1995; the couple have four children. Her daughter Eve Thomas is a current international swimmer representing New Zealand.

== See also ==
- List of Olympic medalists in swimming (women)
- List of World Aquatics Championships medalists in swimming (women)
