= Suzie Landells =

Australian swimmer

Personal information
- Full name: Suzanne Ciscele Landells
- Nickname: "Suzie"
- National team: Australia
- Born: 12 December 1964 (age 61)
- Height: 1.63 m (5 ft 4 in)
- Weight: 57 kg (126 lb)

Sport
- Sport: Swimming
- Strokes: Freestyle, medley
Medal record
Women's swimming
Representing Australia
Olympic Games
Silver medal – second place	1984 Los Angeles	400 m medley
Commonwealth Games
Gold medal – first place	1986 Edinburgh	200 m medley
Gold medal – first place	1986 Edinburgh	400 m medley

Suzanne Ciscele Landells (born 12 December 1964), known after marriage as Suzanne Dill-Macky, was an Australian individual medley swimmer of the 1980s, who won the silver medal in the 400-metre individual medley at the 1984 Summer Olympics in Los Angeles Olympics. She was an Australian Institute of Sport scholarship holder.

Raised in Queensland, Landells was selected to represent Australia in the 400m individual medley, but was not expected to do well, barely scraping into the final. Although she was left far behind by the United States' Tracy Caulkins, she swam a personal best of 4 minutes 48.3 seconds to claim the silver medal.

Two years later at the 1986 Commonwealth Games in Edinburgh, Landells enjoyed more success, winning the 200-metre and 400-metre individual medley, and also breaking the 400-metre individual medley Commonwealth record.

== See also ==
- List of Olympic medalists in swimming (women)

== Bibliography ==
- Andrews, Malcolm (2000). Australia at the Olympic Games. Sydney, New South Wales: ABC Books. p. 243. ISBN 0-7333-0884-8.
- Profile
