= Swimming at the 1975 Pan American Games – Women's 200 metre butterfly =

Women's 200 metre butterfly at the 1975 Pan American Games
- Venue: -
- Dates: October 23 (preliminaries and finals)
- Competitors: from - nations

Medalists
Gold medal	Camille Wright	United States
Silver medal	Cheryl Gibson	Canada
Bronze medal	Rosemary Ribeiro	Brazil

The women's 200 metre butterfly competition of the swimming events at the 1975 Pan American Games took place on 23 October. The last Pan American Games champion was Lynn Colella of the United States.

This race consisted of four lengths of the pool, all lengths being in butterfly stroke.

== Results ==
All times are in minutes and seconds.

KEY:	q	Fastest non-qualifiers	Q	Qualified	GR	Games record	NR	National record	PB	Personal best	SB	Seasonal best

=== Final ===
The final was held on October 23.

Rank	Name	Nationality	Time	Notes
1st place, gold medalist(s)	Camille Wright	United States	2:18.57	
2nd place, silver medalist(s)	Cheryl Gibson	Canada	2:21.95	
3rd place, bronze medalist(s)	Rosemary Ribeiro	Brazil	2:22.47	
4	-	-	-	
5	Flávia Nadalutti	Brazil	2:23.66	
6	-	-	-	
7	-	-	-	
8	-	-	-	
