= Anna McVann =

Australian swimmer

Personal information
- Full name: Anna Therese McVann
- National team: Australia
- Born: 30 December 1968 (age 57)
- Height: 1.70 m (5 ft 7 in)
- Weight: 54 kg (119 lb)

Sport
- Sport: Swimming
- Strokes: Freestyle

Anna Therese McVann (born 30 December 1968) is a former competition swimmer who represented Australia at the 1984 Summer Olympics in Los Angeles. At the age of 14, Anna McVann swam in her first national championships broke a national age record for the 200-metre freestyle event. McVann set 120 different South Australian records in several different events. In 1984 she became the first female to win gold medals in all freestyle events at the Australian championships. This effort saw her automatically selected for the 1984 Summer Olympics in Los Angeles, where she was a finalist in all her events: 200-, 400-, and 800-metre freestyle and 4×100-metre freestyle relay.

McVann would also compete at the inaugural Pan-Pacific Meet in Tokyo in 1985 and then again at 1986 Commonwealth Games in Edinburgh, making the final in the 400-, and 800- metre freestyle events.

After returning home following the Commonwealth Games McVann retired from swimming to study physiotherapy but would return to swimming again in 1990 before finally retiring in 1992.

In 2000 McVann was a torch bearer in the Torch Relay for the Sydney Olympics.

In 2008 McVann was inducted into the SwimmingSA Hall of Fame.
