= Swimming at the 1979 Pan American Games – Women's 400 metre freestyle =

Women's 400 metre freestyle at the 1979 Pan American Games
- Venue: Piscina Olimpica Del Escambron
- Dates: July 6 (preliminaries and finals)
- Competitors: from - nations

Medalists
Gold medal	Cynthia Woodhead	United States
Silver medal	Tracy Caulkins	United States
Bronze medal	Wendy Quirk	Canada

The women's 400 metre freestyle competition of the swimming events at the 1979 Pan American Games took place on 6 July at the Piscina Olimpica Del Escambron. The last Pan American Games champion was Kathy Heddy of US.

This race consisted of eight lengths of the pool, with all eight being in the freestyle stroke.

== Results ==
All times are in minutes and seconds.

KEY:	q	Fastest non-qualifiers	Q	Qualified	GR	Games record	NR	National record	PB	Personal best	SB	Seasonal best

=== Heats ===
The first round was held on July 6.

Rank	Name	Nationality	Time	Notes
1	Cynthia Woodhead	United States	4:22.44	Q
2	Tracy Caulkins	United States	4:23.18	Q
3	Anne Jardin	Canada	4:23.93	Q
4	Wendy Quirk	Canada	4:23.94	Q
5	Andrea Neumayer	Argentina	4:35.47	Q
6	Maria Perez	Venezuela	4:35.50	Q
7	Monica Ramirez	Mexico	4:36.26	Q
8	Georgina Osorio	Panama	4:38.14	Q
9	Ana Anchieta	Brazil	4:38.20	
10	Genevieve Hernandez	Puerto Rico	4:38.52	
11	Veronica Espinosa	Mexico	4:38.84	
12	Sonia Acosta	Puerto Rico	4:39.53	
13	Maria Vieira	Brazil	4:40.17	
14	Julia Vicioso	Dominican Republic	5:01.75	

=== Final ===
The final was held on July 6.

Rank	Name	Nationality	Time	Notes
1st place, gold medalist(s)	Cynthia Woodhead	United States	4:10.56	NR, GR
2nd place, silver medalist(s)	Tracy Caulkins	United States	4:16.13	
3rd place, bronze medalist(s)	Wendy Quirk	Canada	4:17.34	
4	Anne Jardin	Canada	4:25.45	
5	Andrea Neumayer	Argentina	4:28.39	NR
6	Maria Perez	Venezuela	4:36.86	
7	Monica Ramirez	Mexico	4:37.18	
8	Georgina Osorio	Panama	4:38.74	
