= Karen Ward =

Canadian swimmer

Personal information
- Born: 5 May 1966 (age 60) Montreal, Quebec, Canada

Sport
- Sport: Swimming

Karen Ward (born 5 May 1966) is a Canadian swimmer. She competed in the women's 800 metre freestyle at the 1984 Summer Olympics.
