= Nathalie Gingras =

Canadian swimmer

Personal information
- Born: 3 March 1964 (age 62) LaSalle, Quebec, Canada

Sport
- Sport: Swimming

Nathalie Gingras (born 3 March 1964) is a Canadian swimmer. She competed in the women's 400 metre individual medley at the 1984 Summer Olympics.
