= Sue Heon =

American swimmer (born 1962)

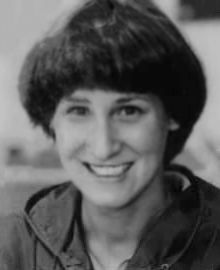
- Heon in 1984

Personal information
- Full name: Susan Helen Heon
- Nickname: "Sue"
- National team: United States
- Born: May 31, 1962 (age 64) Summit, New Jersey, U.S.
- Height: 5 ft 9 in (1.75 m)
- Weight: 137 lb (62 kg)

Sport
- Sport: Swimming
- Strokes: Individual medley
- Club: Pitt Aquatic Club
- College team: University of Pittsburgh
- Coach: Dick Bradshaw (U. Pitt.); Dave Belowich (U. Pitt); Mark Schubert (84 Olympics)

Susan Helen Heon (born May 31, 1962), later known by her married name Susan Preston, is an American former competition swimmer who swam for the University of Pittsburgh receiving All America Honors all four years of her college eligibility and setting seven school records. She represented the United States at the 1984 Summer Olympics in Los Angeles, California, placing fourth in the finals of the 400-meter Individual Medley.

Susan was born the daughter of Mr. and Mrs. Arthur Heon in Summit, New Jersey on May 31, 1962, but grew up in Clarks Summit, Pennsylvania, where she attended High School.

== Career ==
=== Early swimming and education ===
Sue swam for Abington Heights High School, where as a multi-stroke competitor, she broke records in freestyle, breaststroke, backstroke, and individual medley events. In August of 1979, Sue took two gold medals in the Junior Long Course Swim Championships in California, setting age group records in the 200 and 400 IM. She then moved to Pittsburgh to finish High School classes at Shaler High School, and be closer to the Pitt Aquatic Club. At Pitt Aquatic, she trained with Coach Dick Bradshaw, who would also coach her when she later attended the University of Pittsburgh. Gaining national attention in April 1980, she finished fourth in the 400 Individual Medley at the AAU Long Course National meet in Austin, Texas.

=== University of Pittsburgh ===
Heon swam for the University of Pittsburgh under Coaches Dick Bradshaw and his successor Dave Belowich on a full swimming scholarship, from 1981-1985, setting seven school records. At Pitt, she earned All-America honors 11 times, receiving national prominence each season of her collegiate career. She was the only Pitt swimmer to make all American four years in a row and to swim in the Olympics. Highly accomplished and diverse in her stroke skills, in independent competition she garnered honors three times in the 400 individual medley, twice in the 500 freestyle, twice in the 1650 freestyle, and once in the 200 backstroke, as well as swimming on three championship relay teams. She was a Big East individual champion a total of nine times and a relay champion twice. She sat out most of her Junior year to train for the 1984 Olympics.

Named most valuable swimmer of the competition, at the Big East Conference Swimming Championships at Pitt in her Senior year on March 1-2, 1984, she set a record in four events, qualifying her for the NCAA Championships. In the 500-yard freestyle she swam a conference record first place time of 4:53.27, in the 400-yard IM she placed first with a Conference record time of 4:25.04, in the 1650-yard freestyle she set another Conference record time of 16:31.78, and set a fourth Big East record time in the 200-yard backstroke of 2:06.7.

In 1985, she was highly instrumental in leading the U. of Pittsburgh lady panthers to their third consecutive Big East Swimming Conference championship.

During the summers, she received serious training with Dick Schoulberg of Germantown aquatics, particularly while training for the 1984 Olympics.

=== International competition ===
She earned her first medal in international competition, a gold, in the women's 400-meter individual medley on August 27, 1982 at the U.S.-Russia Dual meet at the University of Tennessee in Knoxville. She placed second in the 400 IM at the Tokyo International Swimming Meet.

=== 1980, 84 Summer Olympics ===
At age 18, was selected for the 1980 Olympic team, due to her performance in the August 1980 Senior Long Course Championships where she received a seventh in the 400 IM, and more significantly, a third in the 200 IM. Her 1980 selection occurred her first year at U. of Pittsburgh, but due to the U.S. Boycott by President Jimmy Carter, she was unable to attend the Moscow Olympics. For the 1980 Olympics, her training yardage ranged from 16,000 to 20,000 meters daily, similar to the Olympic training yardage for many men swimmers.

At the 1984 Olympic trials in Indianapolis, Indiana, she finished second to Tracy Caulkins 400 IM, earning her a spot on the Olympic Team. Her time in the 400-meter IM was 4:46.36 in the trials prior to the 1984 Olympics, earning her a ranking of third in the world in the event.

At the 1984 Los Angeles Olympics, where she was coached by Hall of Fame Olympic Coach Mark Schubert of California's Mission Viejo Nadadores Swim Club, she won her heat in the preliminaries, but finished fourth with a 4:49.5 in the final event of the women's 400-meter individual medley, about three seconds slower than her time at the Olympic trials. She was just under a second behind the bronze third place finisher, Petra Zindler, but a full ten seconds behind her American rival Tracy Caulkins who took the gold. Had she been able to match her time at the 1984 Olympic trials, she would have been clearly a medal contender.

== Honors ==
She was inducted into the University of Pittsburgh Athletics Hall of Fame in 2019. She also received the 1985 Big East Outstanding Swimmer Award. When the University of Pittsburgh Pool was improved in 2016, Heon-Preston's image was one of the few swimmer placed on a "Legends" wall in the newly renovated U. of Pittsburgh Trees Pool.

== Life after swimming ==
After College and swimming competition, Heon worked as an elementary school teacher, teaching mostly fourth grade, and living near the San Francisco Bay Area with husband Jim Preston, an athlete and Ironman triathlete competitor, and their two children.

Continuing to swim, in the summer of 2016 she set a National record in the Masters division for the 10K swim (6.2 miles), and broke the Masters world record for the 800-meter (approximated .5 miles) freestyle by four seconds. As of 2014 her four remaining swimming records at Pitt had all been eclipsed but they included the 400 IM, the 500 freestyle, the 1000 freestyle, the last to be broken, and the 1650 freestyle. She was still working as a fourth grade teacher in California at the time.
