= Swimming at the 1975 Pan American Games – Women's 400 metre freestyle =

Women's 400 metre freestyle at the 1975 Pan American Games
- Venue: -
- Dates: October 22 (preliminaries and finals)
- Competitors: from - nations

Medalists
Gold medal	Kathy Heddy	United States
Silver medal	Kathie Wickstrand	United States
Bronze medal	Michele Oliver	Canada

The women's 400 metre freestyle competition of the swimming events at the 1975 Pan American Games took place on 22 October. The last Pan American Games champion was Ann Simmons of the United States.

This race consisted of eight lengths of the pool, with all eight being in the freestyle stroke.

== Results ==
All times are in minutes and seconds.

KEY:	q	Fastest non-qualifiers	Q	Qualified	GR	Games record	NR	National record	PB	Personal best	SB	Seasonal best

=== Final ===
The final was held on October 22.

Rank	Name	Nationality	Time	Notes
1st place, gold medalist(s)	Kathy Heddy	United States	4:23.00	GR
2nd place, silver medalist(s)	Kathie Wickstrand	United States	4:27.66	
3rd place, bronze medalist(s)	Michele Oliver	Canada	4:30.20	
4	-	-	-	
5	Maria Guimarães	Brazil	4:39.00	
6	-	-	-	
7	-	-	-	
8	Leila Louzada	Brazil	4:51.85	
