= Julia Vicioso =

Dominican historian and preservationist

- Born: 19 May 1961 (age 65); New York City, U.S.
- Occupations: Architectural historian; preservationist; swimmer

Academic background
- Education: Universidad Nacional Pedro Henríquez Ureña; Sapienza University of Rome
- Thesis: Problemi di Lettura delle Superfici Architettoniche: Metodologia di Restauro per una fabbrica romana del Cinquecento (1993)

Academic work
- Discipline: Architectural history
- Sub-discipline: Italian architecture
- Institutions: Sapienza University of Rome; Universidad Nacional Pedro Henríquez Ureña; Istituto Superiore per la Conservazione ed il Restauro

Julia Antonia Vicioso Varelas is a Dominican historian, preservationist, and former swimmer. After competing for the Dominican Republic in the 1979 Pan American Games, where she set national records in swimming, she studied architecture at the Universidad Nacional Pedro Henríquez Ureña and the Sapienza University of Rome, before working as a professor in both institutions. A 1999 Guggenheim Fellow, she worked on the restoration of the San Pietro in Montorio while working at the Istituto Superiore per la Conservazione ed il Restauro.

== Biography ==
Julia Antonia Vicioso Varelas was born in New York City on 19 May 1961. A founding member of Club Deportivo Naco during her youth, she was a competitive swimmer, participating at the Central American and Caribbean Swimming Championships in 1971, 1973, 1975, and 1977, and at the 1978 Central American and Caribbean Games.

In the 1979 Pan American Games, as part of the Dominican Republic's debut delegation, she competed in the 100 metre butterfly, 100 metre freestyle, 200 metre freestyle, and 400 metre freestyle. Although she was eliminated in the heats for all four events and ranked last place in the 100 metre butterfly and 200 metre freestyle, she set a national record in the latter (at 2:18.38) and the 100 metre freestyle (at 1:02.30); She won the Asociación de Cronistas Deportivos de Santo Domingo Swimmer of the Year award twice consecutively: in 1977 and in 1978. In 1980, she retired as a competitive swimmer, but later returned as an administrator for the 2009 World Aquatics Championships. In 2012, she was inducted to Club Naco's Inmortalidad del Deporte hall of fame in her capacity as an athlete.

She worked as an architect in Santo Domingo after her 1983 graduation from the Universidad Nacional Pedro Henríquez Ureña (UNPHU). She later moved abroad to the Sapienza University of Rome, where she obtained her master's degree in 1990 and her PhD in 1994. Her 1993 doctoral thesis on the Basilica of San Giovanni dei Fiorentini, Problemi di Lettura delle Superfici Architettoniche: Metodologia di Restauro per una fabbrica romana del Cinquecento, was supervised by Giovanni Carbonara. She remained at Sapienza as an Assistant Professor of Architectural Restoration from 1995 to 1997, before returning to UNPHU to become professor in 1998.

In 1999, she was appointed a Guggenheim Fellow for research on the impact of the Alcázar de Colón on Spanish Colonial architecture; with this fellowship, she was able to travel to, among other places, the General Archive of the Indies for said research.

As an academic, she specializes in architectural history and conservation and restoration of immovable cultural property. She wrote several scholarly articles on Italian architecture and heritage restoration. One of the buildings she helped restore while working at the Istituto Superiore per la Conservazione ed il Restauro was San Pietro in Montorio. In 2014, she published the book Costanza Francini tra Artemisia Gentileschi e le Committenze della Compagnia della Pietà in San Giovanni dei Fiorentini a Roma.

She also works as a diplomat, having served as Permanent Representative of the Dominican Republic to the UN Agencies in Rome.
