= Frank Richardson (swimmer) =

Nicaraguan swimmer (born 1962)

Frank Richardson Armengol
Personal information
- Born: 21 April 1962 (age 64) Managua, Nicaragua

Sport
- Sport: Swimming

Frank Richardson Armengol (born 21 April 1962) is a Nicaraguan former swimmer. He competed in three events at the 1976 Summer Olympics. His parents were come from the USA. He is the brother of Michele Richardson who represented the United States at the 1984 Summer Olympics, winning a silver medal in the women's 800 metres freestyle. He is of American and Cuban descent.
