= Swimming at the 1975 Pan American Games – Women's 200 metre backstroke =

Women's 200 metre backstroke at the 1975 Pan American Games
- Venue: -
- Dates: October 22 (preliminaries and finals)
- Competitors: from - nations

Medalists
Gold medal	Donna Wennerstrom	United States
Silver medal	Lynn Chénard	Canada
Bronze medal	Cheryl Gibson	Canada

The women's 200 metre backstroke competition of the swimming events at the 1975 Pan American Games took place on 22 October. The last Pan American Games champion was Donna Gurr of Canada.

This race consisted of four lengths of the pool, all in backstroke.

== Results ==
All times are in minutes and seconds.

KEY:	q	Fastest non-qualifiers	Q	Qualified	GR	Games record	NR	National record	PB	Personal best	SB	Seasonal best

=== Final ===
The final was held on October 22.

Rank	Name	Nationality	Time	Notes
1st place, gold medalist(s)	Donna Wennerstrom	United States	2:19.93	GR
2nd place, silver medalist(s)	Lynn Chénard	Canada	2:21.26	
3rd place, bronze medalist(s)	Cheryl Gibson	Canada	2:22.68	
4	-	-	-	
5	-	-	-	
6	Rosamaria Prado	Brazil	2:32.53	
7	-	-	-	
8	-	-	-	
