= Swimming at the 1975 Pan American Games – Women's 100 metre backstroke =

Women's 100 metre backstroke at the 1975 Pan American Games
- Venue: -
- Dates: October 20 (preliminaries and finals)
- Competitors: from - nations

Medalists
| Gold medal | Lynn Chénard | Canada |
| Silver medal | Rosemary Boone | United States |
| Bronze medal | Jenny Kemp | United States |

The women's 100 metre backstroke competition of the swimming events at the 1975 Pan American Games took place on 20 October. The last Pan American Games champion was Donna Gurr of Canada.

This race consisted of two lengths of the pool, all in backstroke.

== Results ==
All times are in minutes and seconds.

| KEY: | q | Fastest non-qualifiers | Q | Qualified | GR | Games record | NR | National record | PB | Personal best | SB | Seasonal best |

=== Final ===
The final was held on October 20.

| Rank | Name | Nationality | Time | Notes |
|---|---|---|---|---|
| 1st place, gold medalist(s) | Lynn Chénard | Canada | 1:06.59 | GR |
| 2nd place, silver medalist(s) | Rosemary Boone | United States | 1:07.18 | |
| 3rd place, bronze medalist(s) | Jenny Kemp | United States | 1:07.29 | |
| 4 | - | - | - | |
| 5 | Rosamaria Prado | Brazil | 1:10.70 | |
| 6 | - | - | - | |
| 7 | - | - | - | |
| 8 | - | - | - | |
