= José Álvarez (Mexican sport shooter) =

Mexican sports shooter

Personal information
- Nationality: Mexican
- Born: 7 October 1947 (age 77)

Sport
- Sport: Sports shooting

José Álvarez (born 7 October 1947) is a Mexican sports shooter. He competed at the 1980 Summer Olympics, the 1984 Summer Olympics and the 1988 Summer Olympics.
