= Jeanne Haney =

American swimmer

Personal information
- Full name: Jeanne Marie Haney
- National team: United States
- Born: September 2, 1958 (age 68) North Richmond, Wisconsin
- Height: 5 ft 4 in (1.63 m)
- Weight: 115 lb (52 kg)

Sport
- Sport: Swimming
- Strokes: 400 meter Individual medley
- Club: Woodland Hills Swim Club; Aquarius Swim Club
- College team: University of California Los Angeles
- Coach: Alan Weiss (Aquarius Swim); Larry Raymond (Woodland Hills); Colleen Graham (UCLA)

Jeanne Marie Haney (born September 2, 1958), also known by her married name Jeanne Neville, is an American former competitive swimmer who competed two years for UCLA and participated in the 1976 Summer Olympics in Montreal, Quebec.

Haney was born September 2, 1958 in North Richmond, Wisconsin. By the age of eight she was swimming competitively in California and by eleven she lived in Woodland Hills California, and swam for the Woodland Hills Swim Club under Coach Larry Raymond. Known for her long locks, and diminutive size, at eleven she was 4 feet, 9 inches as the time, and weighed around eighty pounds. She attended Louisville High School in greater Woodland Hills. In her early years, she specialized in the 300 and 400 meter individual medley and the 400-meter freestyle. Showing considerable speed, she swam the 200-meter Individual Medley in 2:46, breaking the Canadian age group record for the event. At 11 at the Canadian Open, she swam the 200-meter freestyle in 2:25, just over the Canadian age group record, and 400-meter freestyle was in the low 4:40's well below the Canadian age group record at the time. She swam for the Aquarius Swim Club in Long Beach California by the mid-70's under Coach Alan Weiss who likely coached her by the age of 3, and formed the Aquarius Swim Club officially in 1970. In 1975, the Aquarius Swim Club won the National AAU Championships.

Haney qualified for the 1976 U.S. Olympic team with a second place finish behind Shirley Babashoff in the 400-meter Individual Medley with an unexpected time of 4:59.21, having just completed High School in 1976. Haney became only the fifth American woman to ever go under five minutes in the event.

== 1976 Montreal Olympics ==
At the 1976 Montreal Olympics, Haney competed in the women's 400-meter individual medley placing fifteenth with a time of 5:10.53. Ulrike Tauber of East Germany won the gold with a time of 4:42.77.

She swam for the University of California Los Angeles on an Athletic Scholarship from 1976 to 1978 where she was trained for a period by Colleen Graham and had Olympic Champion Shirley Babashoff and Olympian Kathy Heddy as teammates. She completed her education at the University of Southern California in 1981 and graduated with a Bachelor of Science in Dental Hygiene.

She had a career as a dental assistant in Woodland Hills, California.

== See also ==
- List of University of California, Los Angeles people
