= Patricia Kohlmann =

Mexican swimmer (born 1968)

Personal information
- Full name: Patricia Kohlmann Hackl
- Born: September 17, 1968 (age 57) Mexico
- Height: 1.77 m (5 ft 10 in)
- Weight: 59 kg (130 lb)

Sport
- Sport: Swimming
- Strokes: Freestyle
Medal record
Women's swimming
Representing Mexico
Pan American Games
Bronze medal – third place	1983 Caracas	4x100m freestyle
Bronze medal – third place	1983 Caracas	4x100m medley

Patricia Kohlmann (born September 17, 1968) is a Mexican former female freestyle and medley swimmer who participated in two consecutive Summer Olympics for her native country, starting in 1984. Her best result was the 11th place in the Women's 4 × 100 m Freestyle Relay at the 1984 Summer Olympics in Los Angeles, California, alongside Teresa Rivera, Rosa Fuentes, and Irma Huerta.
