= Rosa Fuentes =

Mexican swimmer (born 1965)

Personal information
- Full name: Rosa Fuentes
- Born: November 30, 1965 (age 60) Mexico
- Height: 1.65 m (5 ft 5 in)
- Weight: 60 kg (130 lb)

Sport
- Sport: Swimming
- Strokes: Freestyle
Medal record
Women's swimming
Representing Mexico
Pan American Games
Bronze medal – third place	1983 Caracas	4x100m freestyle

Rosa Fuentes (born November 30, 1965) is a former female freestyle swimmer from Mexico. She participated at the 1984 Summer Olympics for her native country. Her best and only result in Los Angeles, California was the 11th place in the Women's 4 × 100 m Freestyle Relay, alongside Patricia Kohlmann, Teresa Rivera and Irma Huerta.
