= César Sánchez (swimmer) =

Mexican swimmer (born 1962)

Personal information
- Born: February 28, 1962 (age 64)

Sport
- Sport: Swimming
Medal record
Representing Mexico
Central American and Caribbean Games
Gold medal – first place	1978 Medellin	4x200m freestyle relay

César Sánchez (born 28 February 1962) is a Mexican former Olympic swimmer who competed in the 1984 Summer Olympics.
