= Swimming at the 1975 Pan American Games – Women's 400 metre individual medley =

Women's 400 metre individual medley at the 1975 Pan American Games
- Venue: -
- Dates: October 21 (preliminaries and finals)
- Competitors: from - nations

Medalists
Gold medal	Kathy Heddy	United States
Silver medal	Cheryl Gibson	Canada
Bronze medal	Jennie Franks	United States

The women's 400 metre individual medley competition of the swimming events at the 1975 Pan American Games took place on October 21. The last Pan American Games champion was Leslie Cliff of Canada.

This race consisted of eight lengths of the pool. The first two lengths were swum using the butterfly stroke, the second pair with the backstroke, the third pair of lengths in breaststroke, and the final two were freestyle.

== Results ==
All times are in minutes and seconds.

KEY:	q	Fastest non-qualifiers	Q	Qualified	GR	Games record	NR	National record	PB	Personal best	SB	Seasonal best

=== Final ===
The final was held on October 21.

Rank	Name	Nationality	Time	Notes
1st place, gold medalist(s)	Kathy Heddy	United States	5:06.05	
2nd place, silver medalist(s)	Cheryl Gibson	Canada	5:06.87	
3rd place, bronze medalist(s)	Jennie Franks	United States	5:08.68	
4	-	-	-	
5	Flávia Nadalutti	Brazil	5:21.66	
6	-	-	-	
7	-	-	-	
8	-	-	-	
