= Eduardo Morillo =

Mexican swimmer

Personal information
- Born: 10 June 1962 (age 64)

Sport
- Sport: Swimming

Eduardo Morillo (born 10 June 1962) is a Mexican swimmer. He competed in four events at the 1984 Summer Olympics.
