= Petra Zindler =

German swimmer (born 1966)

Personal information
- Born: February 11, 1966 (age 60) Köln, West Germany

Sport
- Sport: Swimming
- Strokes: Butterfly, medley
Medal record
Representing West Germany
Olympic Games
Bronze medal – third place	1984 Los Angeles	400m individual medley
European Championships
Bronze medal – third place	1983 Rome	400m individual medley

Petra Zindler (born 11 February 1966) is a German former swimmer who competed in the 1984 Summer Olympics.
