= Cheryl Gibson =

Canadian swimmer (born 1959)

Personal information
- Full name: Cheryl Anne Gibson
- National team: Canada
- Born: July 28, 1959 (age 66) Edmonton, Alberta, Canada
- Height: 1.73 m (5 ft 8 in)
- Weight: 59 kg (130 lb)

Sport
- Sport: Swimming
- Strokes: Backstroke, butterfly, medley
- Club: Canadian Dolphin Swim Club
- College team: Arizona State University
Medal record
Women's swimming
Representing Canada
Olympic Games
Silver medal – second place	1976 Montreal	400 m medley
World Championships (LC)
Bronze medal – third place	1978 Berlin	100 m backstroke
Bronze medal – third place	1978 Berlin	200 m backstroke
Commonwealth Games
Gold medal – first place	1978 Edmonton	200 m backstroke
Gold medal – first place	1982 Brisbane	4×100 m medley
Silver medal – second place	1982 Brisbane	200 m medley
Bronze medal – third place	1978 Edmonton	100 m backstroke
Bronze medal – third place	1978 Edmonton	400 m medley
Bronze medal – third place	1982 Brisbane	200 m backstroke
Pan American Games
Silver medal – second place	1975 Mexico City	200 m butterfly
Silver medal – second place	1975 Mexico City	400 m medley
Silver medal – second place	1979 San Juan	100 m backstroke
Silver medal – second place	1979 San Juan	200 m backstroke
Silver medal – second place	1979 San Juan	4×100 m medley
Bronze medal – third place	1975 Mexico City	200 m backstroke
Bronze medal – third place	1975 Mexico City	200 m medley

Cheryl Anne Gibson (born July 28, 1959), is a former competitive swimmer from Canada who won the silver medal in the women's 400-metre individual medley at the 1976 Summer Olympics in Montreal, Quebec. In her international swimming career from 1974 to 1982 she additionally won seven Pan American Games medals, two World Championships medals, six Commonwealth Games medals, and 34 Canadian national titles.

Gibson swam for Arizona State University, and her coaches included Mona Plummer.

She was named winner of the Velma Springstead Trophy awarded to Canada's female athlete of the year.

She held the Alberta provincial record in the 400-metre individual medley for 30 years, before it was broken in December 2008 by a 16-year-old Edmonton high school student. Gibson claimed six national titles as a college swimmer at Arizona State University. In 1979 she won the 200 back and 400 free relay, in 1979 she won the 400 free relay and in 1981 she was a national champion in the 200 back, 400 IM and 400 medley relay. Inducted in 1995, Gibson is a proud member of the Sun Devil Hall of Fame.

She was inducted into the Alberta Sports Hall of Fame in 1986, Edmonton Sports Hall of Fame in 1991, and the Canadian Olympic Hall of Fame in 2001.

Gibson obtained a Chartered Accountant designation in 1986 and a law degree from the University of Toronto in 1989. Gibson worked as a tax attorney in Edmonton and is a Fellow of the Chartered Professional Accountants Alberta.

She became president and chair of Swimming Canada and is a member of its "Circle of Excellence". As of 2024, she serves as a member of World Aquatics, the international body governing international water sports competitions.

== See also ==
- List of Olympic medalists in swimming (women)
- List of World Aquatics Championships medalists in swimming (women)
- List of Commonwealth Games medallists in swimming (women)
