= Ramiro Estrada =

Mexican swimmer

Personal information
- Born: 2 February 1962 (age 64)

Sport
- Sport: Swimming

Ramiro Estrada (born 2 February 1962) is a Mexican swimmer. He competed in three events at the 1984 Summer Olympics.
