= Cynthia Woodhead =

American swimmer (born 1964)

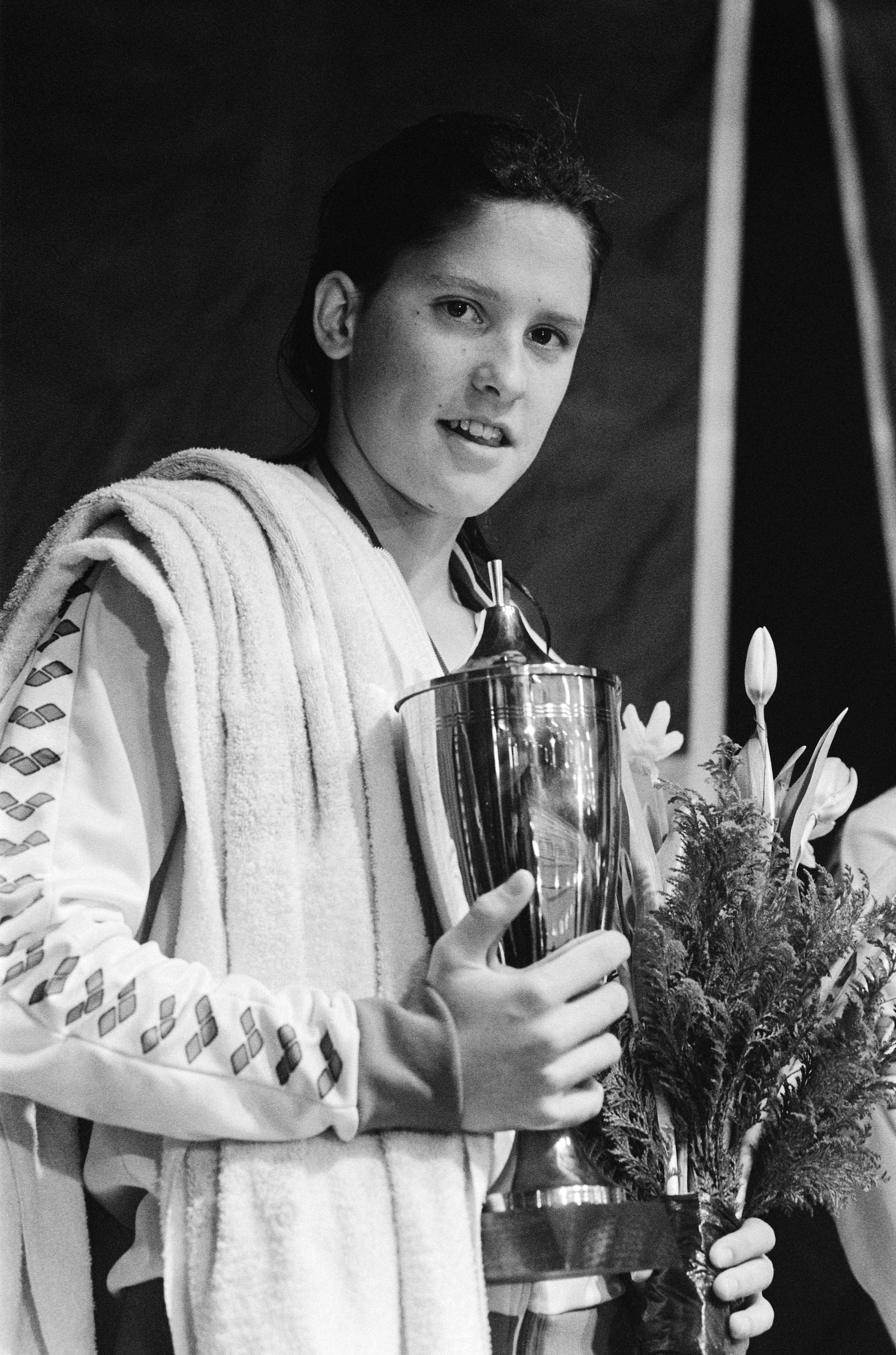
- Woodhead in 1980

Personal information
- Full name: Cynthia Lee Woodhead
- Nickname: Sippy
- National team: United States
- Born: February 7, 1964 (age 62) Riverside, California, U.S.
- Height: 5 ft 6 in (168 cm)
- Weight: 119 lb (54 kg)

Sport
- Sport: Swimming
- Strokes: Freestyle
- Club: Mission Viejo Nadadores
- College team: University of Southern California
Medal record
Women's swimming
Representing the United States
Olympic Games
Silver medal – second place	1984 Los Angeles	200 m freestyle
World Championships (LC)
Gold medal – first place	1978 Berlin	200 m freestyle
Gold medal – first place	1978 Berlin	4×100 m freestyle
Gold medal – first place	1978 Berlin	4×100 m medley
Silver medal – second place	1978 Berlin	400 m freestyle
Silver medal – second place	1978 Berlin	800 m freestyle
Pan American Games
Gold medal – first place	1979 San Juan	100 m freestyle
Gold medal – first place	1979 San Juan	200 m freestyle
Gold medal – first place	1979 San Juan	400 m freestyle
Gold medal – first place	1979 San Juan	4×100 m freestyle
Gold medal – first place	1979 San Juan	4×100 m medley
Gold medal – first place	1983 Caracas	200 m freestyle
Silver medal – second place	1983 Caracas	400 m freestyle

Cynthia Lee Woodhead (born February 7, 1964), commonly known by her family nickname "Sippy", is an American former competition swimmer, world champion, Olympic medalist, and former world record-holder. She won three gold medals at the 1978 World Championships, when she was only 14 years old, and set seven world records during her career.

== Career ==
Woodhead received gold medals in the 200-meter freestyle, 4×100-meter freestyle, and medley relay, and two silver medals at the 1978 World Championships in Berlin when she was only 14 years old.

At the 1979 Pan American Games in San Juan, Puerto Rico, she received five gold medals. She won the 100-, 200-, and 400-meter freestyle, as well as being part of the winning U.S. teams in the 4×100-meter freestyle and 4×100-meter medley relays.

Woodhead had qualified for six events at the 1980 Summer Olympics in Moscow, and was regarded to be among the favorites in the four individual distances, as she was ranked world number one in 100-, 200-, 400-, and 800-meter freestyle. Due to the American boycott of the Moscow Olympics however, she did not get the chance to participate. This was a great disappointment for her, and she has said that the boycott may have triggered her later health problems. She would have been the first woman to win six gold medals at the Olympics.

In late 1981 and 1982, she suffered from several health problems—mononucleosis, a broken leg, and pneumonia.

Woodhead competed at the 1984 Summer Olympics in Los Angeles, where she received a silver medal in 200-meter freestyle, finishing behind compatriot Mary Wayte.

She broke the long course 50-meter freestyle world record, April 10, 1980, but the record was further improved by Jill Sterkel the same day. She also broke the long course 200-meter freestyle world record, three times, in 1978 and 1979, her last result remained a world record until 1984. She was also a member of the U.S. team that held the 4×100-meter freestyle relay world record from 1978 to 1980.

== Awards ==
In 1979, Woodhead was named Swimming World's World Swimmer of the Year and was named USOC Sports Woman of the Year. In 1994, she was inducted into the International Swimming Hall of Fame. In 2003, she was an inaugural inductee to the City of Riverside Sports Hall of Fame.

== See also ==
- List of members of the International Swimming Hall of Fame
- List of Olympic medalists in swimming (women)
- List of University of Southern California people
- List of World Aquatics Championships medalists in swimming (women)
- World record progression 50 metres freestyle
- World record progression 200 metres freestyle
- World record progression 400 metres freestyle
- World record progression 4 × 100 meters freestyle relay

Records
Preceded by Barbara Krause	Women's 200-meter freestyle world record-holder (long course); August 22, 1978 – May 24, 1984	Succeeded by Kristin Otto
Preceded by Anne Jardin	Women's 50-meter freestyle world record-holder (long course); April 10, 1980 – April 10, 1980	Succeeded by Kelly Asplund
Awards
Preceded by Tracy Caulkins	World Swimmer of the Year; 1979	Succeeded by ~~Petra Schneider~~
Preceded by Tracy Caulkins	USOC Sportswoman of the Year; 1979	Succeeded by Beth Heiden
