= Swimming at the 1975 Pan American Games – Women's 200 metre individual medley =

Women's 200 metre individual medley at the 1975 Pan American Games
- Venue: -
- Dates: October 19 (preliminaries and finals)
- Competitors: from - nations

Medalists
Gold medal	Kathy Heddy	United States
Silver medal	Jennie Franks	United States
Bronze medal	Cheryl Gibson	Canada

The women's 200 metre individual medley competition of the swimming events at the 1975 Pan American Games took place on 19 October. The last Pan American Games champion was Leslie Cliff of Canada.

This race consisted of four lengths of the pool, one each in backstroke, breaststroke, butterfly and freestyle swimming.

== Results ==
All times are in minutes and seconds.

KEY:	q	Fastest non-qualifiers	Q	Qualified	GR	Games record	NR	National record	PB	Personal best	SB	Seasonal best

=== Final ===
The final was held on October 19.

Rank	Name	Nationality	Time	Notes
1st place, gold medalist(s)	Kathy Heddy	United States	2:22.22	
2nd place, silver medalist(s)	Jennie Franks	United States	2:23.37	
3rd place, bronze medalist(s)	Cheryl Gibson	Canada	2:24.22	
4	-	-	-	
5	Flávia Nadalutti	Brazil	2:31.37	
6	-	-	-	
7	Jacqueline Mross	Brazil	2:36.23	
8	-	-	-	
