= Carlos Romo =

Mexican swimmer

Personal information
- Born: 27 October 1966 (age 59)

Sport
- Sport: Swimming

Carlos Romo (born 27 October 1966) is a Mexican swimmer. He competed at the 1984 Summer Olympics and the 1988 Summer Olympics.
