= Karen Phillips =

Australian swimmer

Personal information
- Full name: Karen Anne Phillips
- National team: Australia
- Born: 4 May 1966 (age 60) Nowra, New South Wales
- Height: 1.70 m (5 ft 7 in)
- Weight: 58 kg (128 lb)

Sport
- Sport: Swimming
- Strokes: Butterfly
Medal record
Women's swimming
Representing Australia
Olympic Games
Silver medal – second place	1984 Los Angeles	200 m butterfly
Commonwealth Games
Silver medal – second place	1986 Edinburgh	200 m butterfly
Bronze medal – third place	1986 Edinburgh	4 x 100 medley

Karen Anne Phillips (born 4 May 1966), known after marriage as Karen Anne Higgison, was an Australian butterfly and individual medley swimmer of the 1980s, who won the silver medal in the 200-metre butterfly at the 1984 Summer Olympics in Los Angeles.

Raised in Nowra, New South Wales, Phillips was selected to represent Australia in the 200-metre butterfly and 400-metre individual medley, but was not expected to do well, barely scraping into the final of the 200-metre butterfly, and narrowly missing the final of the 400-metre individual medley. Although she was left far behind by the United States' Mary T. Meagher, she swam a personal best of 2 minutes 10.56 seconds to claim the silver medal, although Meagher was 7 metres ahead.

Two years later at the 1986 Commonwealth Games in Edinburgh, Scotland, Phillips enjoyed more success, winning the silver medal in the 200-metre butterfly and bronze medal in the 4 x 100 metre medley relay.

She was the inaugural winner of the Australian Institute of Sport Athlete of the Year in 1983–84.

== See also ==
- List of Olympic medalists in swimming (women)

== Bibliography ==
- Andrews, Malcolm (2000). Australia at the Olympic Games. Sydney, New South Wales: ABC Books. p. 351. ISBN 0-7333-0884-8.
