= Birgit Kowalczik =

German swimmer

Personal information
- Born: 21 October 1967 (age 58) Cologne, West Germany

Sport
- Sport: Swimming

Birgit Kowalczik (born 21 October 1967) is a German swimmer. She competed in two events at the 1984 Summer Olympics representing West Germany.
