= Nadia Krüger =

Swiss swimmer

Personal information
- Born: 30 June 1968 (age 58)

Sport
- Sport: Swimming

Nadia Krüger (born 30 June 1968) is a Swiss freestyle swimmer. She competed in two events at the 1984 Summer Olympics.
