= Tracy Caulkins =

American swimmer (born 1963)

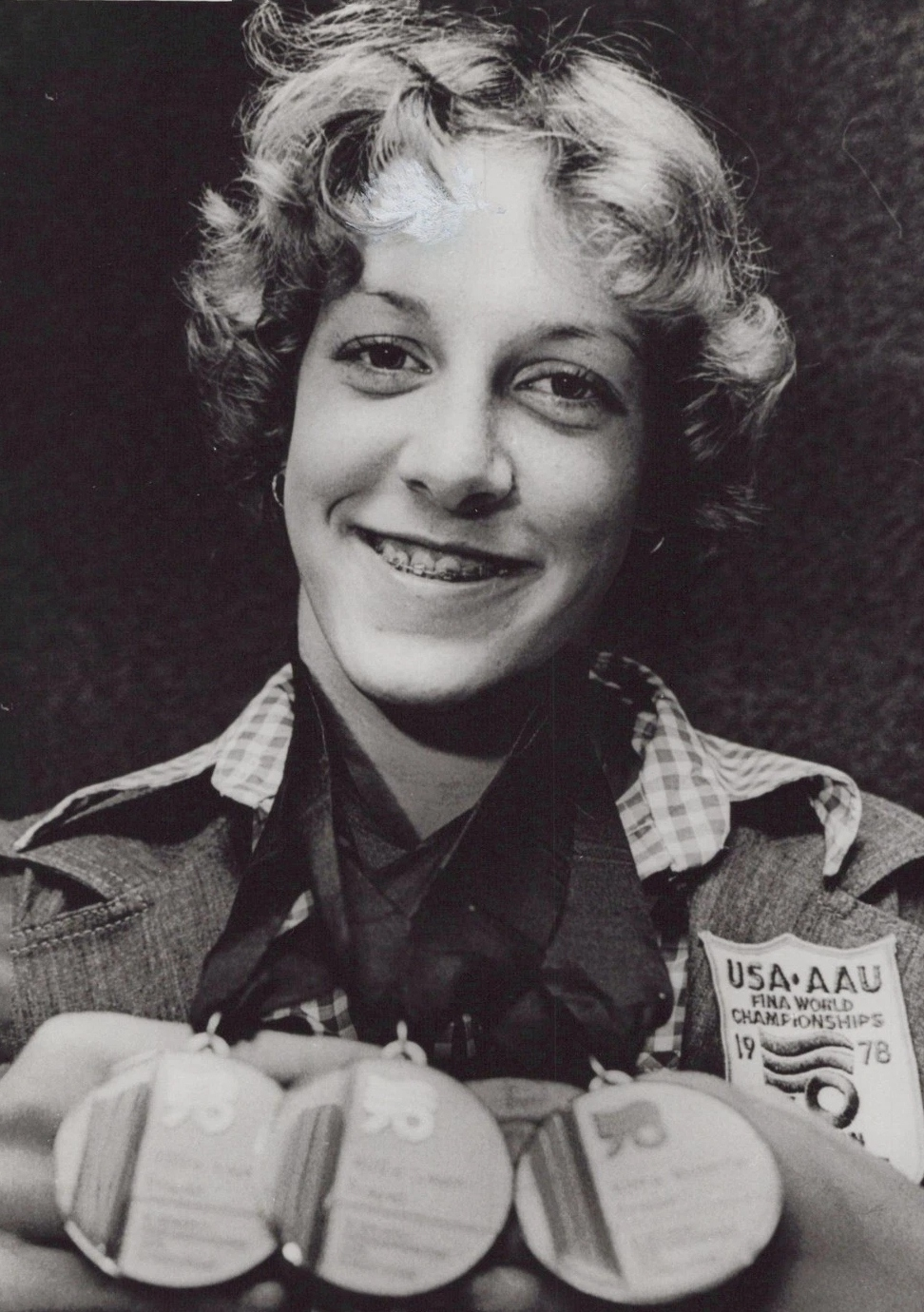
- Caulkins in 1978

Personal information
- Full name: Tracy Anne Stockwell
- National team: United States
- Born: Tracy Anne Caulkins; January 11, 1963 (age 63) Winona, Minnesota, U.S.
- Height: 5 ft 9 in (175 cm)
- Weight: 132 lb (60 kg)

Sport
- Sport: Swimming
- Strokes: Backstroke, breaststroke, butterfly, freestyle, individual medley
- Club: Nashville Aquatic Club (NAC)
- College team: University of Florida
- Coach: Randy Reese (U. Florida); Paul Bergen (NAC)
Medal record
Event	1st	2nd	3rd
Olympic Games	3	0	0
World Championships (LC)	5	1	2
Pan American Games	6	3	0
Total	14	4	2
Event	1st	2nd	3rd
200 m Butterly (OG/WC)	1	0	0
100 m Breaststroke (OC/WC)	0	1	0
200 m Medley (OG/WC)	2	0	1
400m Medley (OG/WC)	2	0	1
Women's 4 × 100 metre freestyle relay (OG/WC)	1	0	0
Women's 4 × 100 metre medley relay (OG/WC)	2	0	0
Total	8	1	2
Women's swimming
Representing United States
Olympic Games
Gold medal – first place	1984 Los Angeles	200 m medley
Gold medal – first place	1984 Los Angeles	400 m medley
Gold medal – first place	1984 Los Angeles	4×100 m medley
World Championships (LC)
Gold medal – first place	1978 Berlin	200 m butterfly
Gold medal – first place	1978 Berlin	200 m medley
Gold medal – first place	1978 Berlin	400 m medley
Gold medal – first place	1978 Berlin	4×100 m freestyle
Gold medal – first place	1978 Berlin	4×100 m medley
Silver medal – second place	1978 Berlin	100 m breaststroke
Bronze medal – third place	1982 Guayaquil	200 m medley
Bronze medal – third place	1982 Guayaquil	400 m medley
Pan American Games
Gold medal – first place	1979 San Juan	200 m medley
Gold medal – first place	1979 San Juan	400 m medley
Gold medal – first place	1979 San Juan	4×100 m freestyle
Gold medal – first place	1979 San Juan	4×100 m medley
Gold medal – first place	1983 Caracas	200 m medley
Gold medal – first place	1983 Caracas	400 m medley
Silver medal – second place	1979 San Juan	400 m freestyle
Silver medal – second place	1979 San Juan	100 m breaststroke
Silver medal – second place	1983 Caracas	200 m butterfly

Tracy Anne Stockwell, OAM, (born January 11, 1963), née Tracy Anne Caulkins, is an American former competition swimmer, three-time Olympic gold medalist, five-time world champion, and former world record-holder in three events.

Caulkins was noted for her versatility and ability in all four major competitive swimming strokes: the butterfly, breaststroke, backstroke and freestyle. Caulkins won forty-eight national championships and set American records in all four strokes over a range of distances as well as in the individual medley (IM) events, which combine all four strokes over the course of a single race. Her versatility brought Caulkins many titles and awards, and as a result she is considered one of the greatest swimmers of all time. By the time she retired from competitive swimming in 1984, Caulkins had set five world records and 63 American records (more than any other American swimmer, male or female).

== Early years ==
Caulkins was born in Winona, Minnesota, in 1963 and moved to Nashville, Tennessee with her family at the age of 6, in 1969. She swam for the Westside Victory Swim club and later the Nashville Aquatic Club (NAC) in Nashville, where she was trained by future University of Texas and U.S. Olympic coach Paul Bergen. For her high school education, she attended the all-girls Harpeth Hall School in Nashville. Caulkins's older sister Amy was also a competition swimmer and water polo player.

== Olympic desire ==
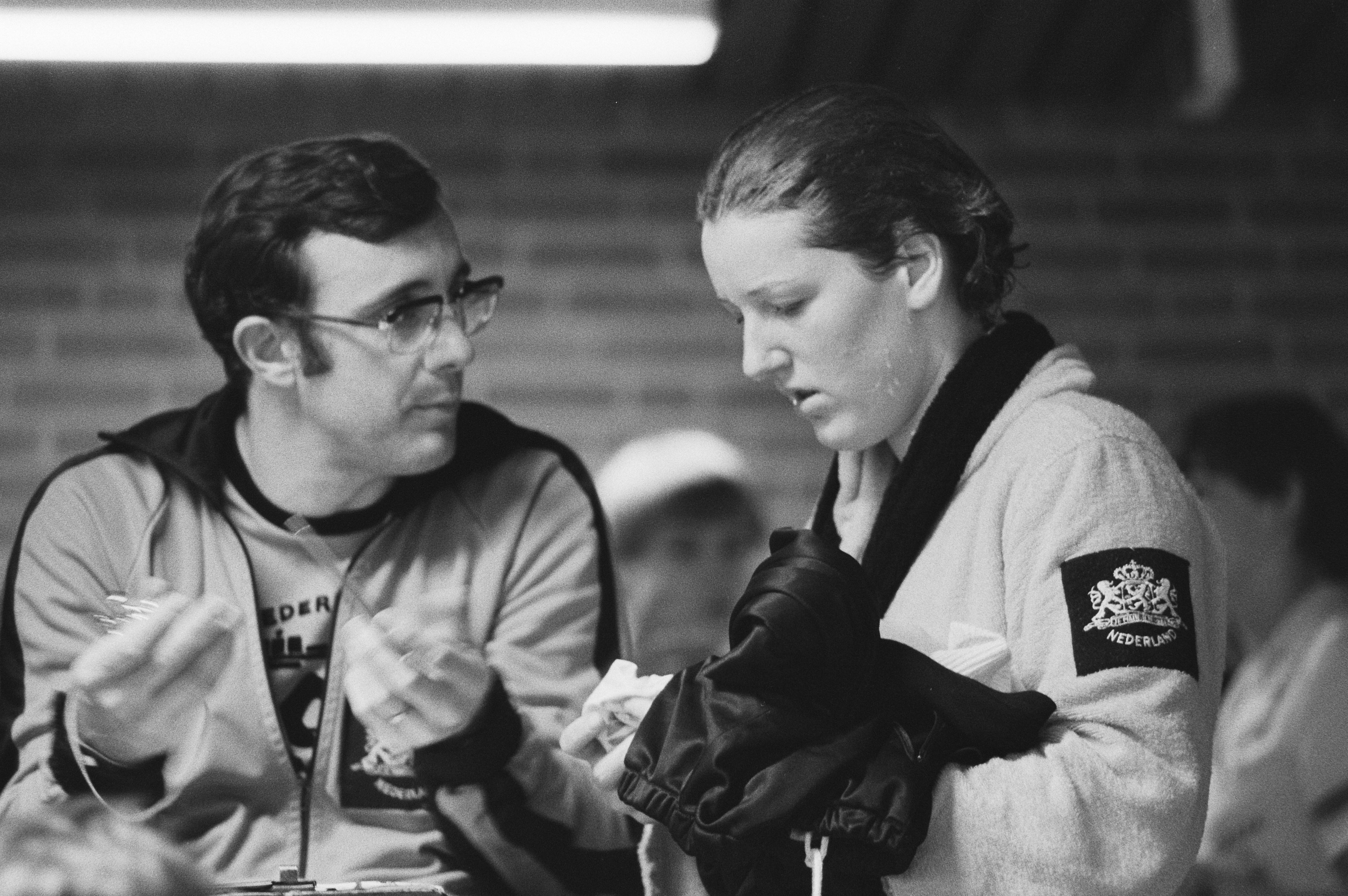
Caulkins with coach in Utrecht, Netherlands in January 1981.

As a nine-year-old, Caulkins had been training as a swimmer for a little over a year when she watched the 1972 Munich Olympics on television, and decided that she wanted to swim in the Olympics and win a gold medal. In a 1997 interview, Caulkins credited her Olympic dream as her inspiration and motivation.

Thirteen-year-old Caulkins competed in her first U.S. national swimming championships in 1976. A year later, she returned to the 1977 U.S. Short-Course Championships to set U.S. records in the 200-yard and 400-yard individual medley events. She set a third U.S. record while finishing second behind Canadian swimmer Robin Corsiglia in the 100-yard breaststroke.

At the age of 15, Caulkins won five gold medals and a silver medal at the 1978 World Championships in West Berlin. She won the 200-meter individual medley, the 400-meter individual medley, and the 200-meter butterfly, and was a member of the winning U.S. teams in the 4×100-meter medley relay, and the 4×100-meter freestyle relay. In the process, she set four world records and one American record. Largely as a result of her performance in Berlin, Caulkins won the 1978 James E. Sullivan Award, given by the Amateur Athletic Union in recognition of the most outstanding American amateur athlete of the year. At 15 years old, she was the youngest-ever recipient of the Sullivan Award.

She followed her World Championship success with a series of dominating finishes in U.S. competition. At the 1979 U.S. Short-Course Championships in East Los Angeles, California, she set five U.S. records in the 100-yard breaststroke, 500-yard freestyle, the 400-yard individual medley, the 200-yard individual medley, and the 100-yard freestyle on the first leg of the 400-yard relay. She also helped her club team, Nashville Aquatic, win the 400-yard medley relay and place second in the 800-yard freestyle relay. Despite setting the new records, however, she was not at her physical best; she was suffering from the after-effects of a viral infection. Three months later, she won four gold medals and two silvers at the 1979 Pan American Games in San Juan, Puerto Rico.

Following her gold-medal performance at the 1978 World Championship, Caulkins was expected to win multiple medals at the 1980 Summer Olympics in Moscow, USSR, and qualified to compete in five individual events at the U.S. Olympic Trials, and likely would have been selected as a member of one of the relay teams as well. However, the U.S. Olympic team and 65 other nations boycotted the 1980 Games following the Soviet Union's 1979 invasion of Afghanistan. Caulkins's dream of Olympic gold was deferred by war and politics, so she quietly looked ahead to 1984.

As an 18-year-old high school senior, she set four American short-course records at the 1981 U.S. Short-Course Championships in Cambridge, Massachusetts. In each of the four events, she bettered her own previously set American record: the 100-yard breaststroke, 200-yard backstroke, the 200-yard individual medley, and the 400-yard individual medley.

She's the greatest swimmer that has ever been so far, men or women.

— Randy Reese, University of Florida and U.S. Olympic
Games swim coach, on Tracy Caulkins,

Over the next three years, Caulkins maintained her training regimen while attending the University of Florida in Gainesville, Florida, where she swam for coach Randy Reese's Florida Gators swimming and diving team in National Collegiate Athletic Association (NCAA) competition from 1982 to 1984. Caulkins followed her older sister Amy to the University of Florida, where Amy was already an established member of the Florida Gators swim team. With Caulkins leading the way as a freshman, the Gators won the NCAA team championship in 1982; the Gators finished second in 1983 and third in 1984. Individually, in three years as a Gator swimmer, she won sixteen NCAA championships and twelve Southeastern Conference (SEC) individual titles, and received twenty-one All-American honors. She was the SEC's Female Swimmer of the Year in 1983 and 1984, and was recognized as the SEC's Female Athlete of the Year in 1984. She was the recipient of the Honda Sports Award for Swimming and Diving for three consecutive years, recognizing her as the outstanding college female swimmer of the year.

At the 1982 U.S. Short-Course Championships in Gainesville, the 19-year-old again won national championships in the 200-yard backstroke, 400-yard individual medley, the 200-yard individual medley, and the 100-yard breaststroke. With thirty-nine national championships to date, Caulkins surpassed the legendary Johnny Weissmuller's record total of thirty-six.

Even as she continued to win against fellow Americans in 1982 and 1983, however, she was slumping and falling behind her international competition. She set no new international records, and was increasingly frustrated with her own performances. At the 1982 World Championships in Guayaquil, Ecuador, she finished a distant third in both the 200-meter and 400-meter individual medley events against her East German competition, and failed to place in the third event in which she was entered. At the 1983 U.S. Long-Course Championships in Fresno, California, she finished five seconds slower than her own American record in the 400-meter individual medley and finished second behind Mary T. Meagher in the 200-meter butterfly. At the 1983 Pan American Games in Caracas, Venezuela, held later the same month, she likewise won her two signature events in the 200-meter and 400-meter individual medley, but did not approach her own personal bests.

Afterward, Caulkins rededicated herself to coach Randy Reese's rigorous training methods. In an international invitational meet of 26 nations held in Austin, Texas, in January 1984, she defeated her East German rivals in both individual medley events. At the NCAA national championships later that spring, she won four individual titles in the 200- and 400-yard individual medleys, 100-yard breaststroke, and 200-yard butterfly, and was a member of the Gators' winning relay teams in the 4×100-yard and 4×200-yard freestyle events. She set new NCAA records in three events, and a new American record in the 200-yard individual medley.

At the 1984 Summer Olympics in Los Angeles, California, Caulkins served as the captain of the U.S. women's swim team, and finally realized her childhood dream of winning an Olympic gold medal. On July 29, she won her first gold medal in the 400-meter individual medley, beating Australian Suzie Landells by over nine seconds. On August 3, she won her second gold medal in the 200-meter individual medley with an Olympic record time of 2:12.64, besting fellow American Nancy Hogshead by over two and a half seconds. And later that same day, she won her third gold medal by swimming the breaststroke leg as a member of the winning U.S. team in the 400-meter medley relay, together with teammates Theresa Andrews (backstroke), Mary T. Meagher (butterfly), and Nancy Hogshead (freestyle). She also finished fourth in the 100-meter breaststroke, one second behind winner Petra van Staveren.

Caulkins ended her competition swimming career having set five world records and sixty-three American records, and having won forty-eight national championship titles.

== Life after competition swimming ==
In the aftermath of the 1984 Olympics, the 21-year-old Caulkins decided to forgo her senior year of NCAA eligibility at the University of Florida to focus on completing her degree requirements, and announced her retirement from competition swimming. She graduated from Florida with her bachelor's degree in broadcasting in 1985, and was inducted into the University of Florida Athletic Hall of Fame as a "Gator Great." Caulkins was inducted into the Florida Sports Hall of Fame in 1983, the International Swimming Hall of Fame in 1990, and the Tennessee Sports Hall of Fame in 1996.

She married Mark Stockwell, an Olympic Swimming Medalist from Australia and a fellow University of Florida alumnus, and has lived in Australia since shortly after graduating from the University of Florida. They live in Queensland, Australia, with their five children.

Caulkins is now an American-Australian dual citizen. In 2008, she was recognized, under her married name, Tracy Anne Stockwell, "For service to sport as an administrator and proponent of sporting opportunities for women" with the Medal of the Order of Australia by the Australian government. After receiving the medal, the American transplant described herself as "one proud Australian."

== World records ==
Women's 200-meter butterfly

Time	Date	Event	Location
2:09.87=	August 26, 1978	FINA World Championships	West Berlin, West Germany

Women's 200-meter individual medley

Time	Date	Event	Location
2:15.09	August 2, 1978	AAU Long-Course National Championships	The Woodlands, Texas
2:14.07	August 30, 1978	FINA World Championships	West Berlin, West Germany
2:13.69	January 5, 1980	USA Women's International Swimming	Austin, Texas

Women's 400-meter individual medley

Time	Date	Event	Location
4:40.83	August 23, 1978	FINA World Championships	West Berlin, West Germany

Women's 4×100-meter freestyle relay

Time	Date	Event	Location
3:43.43	August 26, 1978	FINA World Championships	West Berlin, West Germany

Note: All record times and locations are sourced to USA Swimming's list of world records.

== See also ==
- List of multiple Olympic gold medalists
- List of multiple Olympic gold medalists at a single Games
- List of Olympic medalists in swimming (women)
- List of United States records in swimming
- List of University of Florida alumni
- List of University of Florida Olympians
- List of University of Florida Athletic Hall of Fame members
- List of World Aquatics Championships medalists in swimming (women)
- World record progression 200 metres individual medley
- World record progression 400 metres individual medley
- World record progression 4 × 100 metres freestyle relay

== Bibliography ==
- Caraccioli, Jerry, & Tom Caraccioli, Boycott: Stolen Dreams of the 1980 Moscow Olympic Games, New Chapter Press, Washington, D.C. (2009). ISBN 978-0-942257-54-0.
- Pleasants, Julian M., Gator Tales: An Oral History of the University of Florida, University of Florida, Gainesville, Florida (2006). ISBN 0-8130-3054-4.

Records
Preceded by Ulrike Tauber	Women's 200-meter individual medley world record-holder (long course); August 2, 1978 – May 24, 1980	Succeeded by Petra Schneider
Preceded by Ulrike Tauber	Women's 400-meter individual medley world record-holder (long course); August 23, 1978 – March 30, 1980	Succeeded by Petra Schneider
Awards
Preceded by Rosemarie Ackermann	United Press International; Athlete of the Year; 1978	Succeeded by Marita Koch
Preceded by Ulrike Tauber	Swimming World; World Swimmer of the Year; 1978	Succeeded by Cynthia Woodhead
Preceded by None; Tiffany Cohen	Swimming World; American Swimmer of the Year; 1980–1982; 1984	Succeeded by Tiffany Cohen; Mary T. Meagher
