= Suzanne Kwasny =

Canadian swimmer

Personal information
- Full name: Suzanne Marie Kwasny-Ritchie
- Born: 1962 (age 63–64)

Sport
- Sport: Swimming
- Strokes: Backstroke

Suzanne Marie Kwasny (married name Ritchie, born 1962) is a Canadian former backstroke swimmer. She competed in the 200m backstroke at the 1978 Commonwealth Games, notably briefly holding the Commonwealth Games all time record in this event before finishing fifth in the final. Kwasny went on to become a rower, joining the Thunder Bay Rowing Club and helping them to two gold medals at the Canadian Championships. For her achievements both in rowing and swimming, Kwasny was inducted into the Northwestern Ontario Sports Hall of Fame in 1995.
