= Tiffany Cohen =

American swimmer (born 1966)

Personal information
- Full name: Tiffany Lisa Cohen
- National team: United States
- Born: June 11, 1966 (age 60) Culver City, California, U.S.
- Height: 5 ft 9 in (1.75 m)
- Weight: 139 lb (63 kg)
- Spouse: Bill

Sport
- Sport: Swimming
- Strokes: Freestyle, butterfly
- Club: Mission Viejo Nadadores
- College team: University of Texas; 1988 Graduate
- Coach: Mark Schubert (Nadadores); Richard Quick (UT)
Medal record
Women's swimming
Representing the United States
Olympic Games
Gold medal – first place	1984 Los Angeles	400 m freestyle
Gold medal – first place	1984 Los Angeles	800 m freestyle
World Championships (LC)
Bronze medal – third place	1982 Guayaquil	400 m freestyle
Pan American Games
Gold medal – first place	1983 Caracas	400 m freestyle
Gold medal – first place	1983 Caracas	800 m freestyle

Tiffany Lisa Cohen (born June 11, 1966) is an American former swimmer who was a double gold medalist at the 1984 Summer Olympics in the 400-meter and 800-meter freestyle.

== 1984 Los Angeles Olympic gold medal times ==
Her official gold medal time in the 400 Meter freestyle final at the 1984 Los Angeles Olympics of 4:07.1, was an American record. Her gold medal time for the 800 meter freestyle was even more memorable, 8:24.95, an Olympic record and just .33 seconds short of a World Record.

The American record Cohen set in the 400 meter freestyle at the Olympics stood for three years until December 1987, when Janet Evans broke it at Florida's U.S. Open, setting a new world record in the process. Though Tiffany would reach many goals in her swimming career, she would retire from swimming before setting a world record.

=== Early training and education ===
Cohen is Jewish, and was born to Robert and Shirley Cohen in Culver City, California, in June 1966. She began swimming around the age of eight with California's Culver City Swim Team coached by Bruce Kocsis. When her family fully sensed her swimming potential after she won several national juniors championships, in 1980 they moved her to Mission Viejo to train with the Mission Viejo Nadadores, the premier swimming club in the county. Coached by Mark Schubert, the club was known for training Olympians, and swimmers who were recruited for college scholarships. Her family moved to Mission Viejo from their home in Westchester four months later. With the Nadadores, Tiffany swam year round, often training as much as six hours a day, six days a week. The combined distances for her multiple daily practices could reach 12 miles a day. She attended and graduated Mission Viejo High School around 1984.

=== National outdoor championships ===
While still with the Nadadores in High School in 1981, Cohen won three 400-meter national outdoor championships in a row and in a match with the Soviet Union finished second in the 400 and 800 meters.

=== 1982 National and World Championships ===
On April 10, 1982, in only her second year of international competition, while swimming with the Nadadores, she won the U.S. National Championship at Gainesville, Florida, in the 500-, 1,000-, and 1650-yard freestyle. (Her 1650-yard time - 15:58.52).

In 1982 in early August, she finished third, taking a bronze medal in the 400-meter freestyle at the FINA World Aquatics Championships in Guayaquil, Ecuador. (Her 400-meter time - 4:11:85.4)

=== 1983 Pan American games ===
In August 1983, she was a gold medalist in both the 400 and 800-meter freestyle events at the Pan American games in Caracas.

She also won the 400 and 800 meter freestyle at the Pan Pacific Championships in 1983 in late August in Tokyo, Japan.

=== University of Texas ===
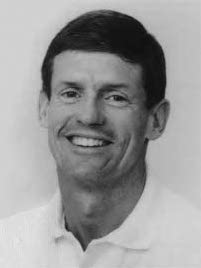
Richard Quick, 1988

After High School graduation, she attended the University of Texas in the Fall of 1984 and trained under Richard Quick, who had also been a coach at the 1984 Olympics where she had just won her two gold medals the previous summer. With her help, Texas won the NCAA Swimming Championships in all four years she attended. At University of Texas, she won NCAA titles in both the 1,650 and 500 yard freestyle. Early in her college career, at the Southwestern College Championships in 1985, Tiffany outpaced her competition and finished first in the 400 Individual Medley, and both the 200 and 500 meter freestyle.

=== 3 Wins 1986 U.S. Nationals ===
In the August 1986 National Long Course Championships in Santa Clara, California, Cohen won the 400- and 800-meter freestyles and the 200-meter butterfly. (Her 400-meter time - 4:14.04, 200 Fly time - 2:12.66). Her four-person team also won the 400 Medley Relay (Their combined time in Medley Relay - 4:19.21). The wins gave her a career total of 16 U.S. National titles.

Her first win of the 1986 National Long Course Championship on August 4, 1986, was in the 800 meter swim, where she clocked a time of 8:36.72. It was the eighth fastest time in the world that year, but was twelve seconds behind the world record time of Tracey Wickham. Cohen was still a top College and National competitor, but was slipping from the World Record times more common to Olympic medal winners. Though she had made a remarkable showing at the U.S. Nationals, she had failed to make the American Team soon to compete in the World Swimming Championships that year. Late in her swimming career, she moved her club membership to the Irvine Novas under Flip Darr around 1987, who trained her for the Pan Pacific Championships that summer.

=== Shoulder surgery and retirement ===
Around 1986, in her Junior year at the University of Texas, she was operated on for torn cartilage in her right shoulder, but recovered and continued to swim competitively, though she had likely reached her peak performance times.

She retired in December 1987, after finishing second to Janet Evans in the 400- and 800-meter races at the 1987 national outdoor meet. At the time of her retirement, she still held the American record in the 1650-yard freestyle of 15:46.54 which she set in 1983. (The record stood until January 1989 when it was broken by Janet Evans at a meet in Long Beach, California.) After retirement, she lectured and wrote to educate the public about the eating disorder bulimia, from which she had struggled at times during her swimming career.

=== Honors ===
In 1983, she was named Swimming World's American Swimmer of the Year. In her Freshman year in College (1984–5), Tiffany was named College female swimmer of the year after breaking two NCAA records. She was inducted into the International Swimming Hall of Fame as an "Honor Swimmer" in 1996.

=== Later life ===
After her retirement from swimming, and her 1988 graduation from the University of Texas with a degree in journalism, Cohen eventually moved to Florida and worked in a business management role developing better hospice care for her home state. She was inspired to work in the field after her father required hospice care. Her daughter was a swimmer for the University of Maine.

== See also ==
- List of members of the International Swimming Hall of Fame
- List of Olympic medalists in swimming (women)
- List of select Jewish swimmers
- List of University of Texas at Austin alumni
- List of World Aquatics Championships medalists in swimming (women)

Awards
Preceded by Tracy Caulkins	Swimming World; American Swimmer of the Year; 1983	Succeeded by Tracy Caulkins
