= Donna Lee Wennerstrom =

American swimmer (born 1960)

Personal information
- Full name: Donna Lee Wennerstrom
- National team: United States
- Born: June 30, 1960 (age 66) Santa Monica, California, U.S.
- Height: 5 ft 10 in (1.78 m)
- Weight: 148 lb (67 kg)

Sport
- Sport: Swimming
- Strokes: Backstroke, butterfly, individual medley
- Club: West Valley Swim Team
- College team: University of California, Los Angeles
Medal record
Women's swimming
Representing the United States
Pan American Games
Gold medal – first place	1975 Mexico City	200 m backstroke

Donna Lee Wennerstrom (born June 30, 1960), also known by her married name Donna Lee Carlson, is an American former competition swimmer and Pan American Games champion. Wennerstrom represented the United States at the 1976 Summer Olympics in Montreal, Quebec. She finished sixth in the final of the women's 400-meter individual medley with a time of 4:55.34. She also competed in the preliminary heats of the women's 200-meter butterfly, recording a best time of 2:15.56.

== See also ==
- List of University of California, Los Angeles people
