= Jolande van der Meer =

Dutch swimmer (born 1964)

Medal record

Women's swimming

Representing the Netherlands

European Championships
Silver medal – second place	1985 Sofia	4×200 m freestyle
Bronze medal – third place	1983 Rome	4×200 m freestyle

Johanna Emerentia "Jolande" van der Meer (born 18 November 1964 in Delft) is a retired Dutch freestyle swimmer who won two bronze team relay medals at the 1983 and 1985 European Aquatics Championships. She also participated in the 1984 Summer Olympics and finished sixth in the 400 metre and 800 metre freestyle events. Between 1983 and 1984 she set four national records in the 800 metre and 1500 metre freestyle.
