= Monica Olmi =

Italian swimmer

Personal information
- Born: 6 August 1970 (age 55) La Spezia, Italy

Sport
- Sport: Swimming

Monica Olmi (born 6 August 1970) is an Italian former swimmer. She competed in four events at the 1984 Summer Olympics.
