= Elke Holtz =

Mexican swimmer (born 1964)

Personal information
- Born: 27 April 1964 (age 62)

Sport
- Sport: Swimming
Medal record
Representing Mexico
Pan American Games
Bronze medal – third place	1979 San Juan	4x100m medley relay
Central American and Caribbean Games
Gold medal – first place	1978 Medellin	100m breaststroke
Gold medal – first place	1978 Medellin	200m breaststroke
Gold medal – first place	1978 Medellin	200m individual medley
Gold medal – first place	1978 Medellin	400m individual medley

Elke Holtz (born 27 April 1964) is a Mexican breaststroke and medley swimmer. She competed in three events at the 1980 Summer Olympics.
