= Marie Moore =

Canadian swimmer

Personal information
- National team: Canada
- Born: May 1, 1967 (age 59) Sydney, Nova Scotia
- Height: 178 cm (5 ft 10 in)
- Weight: 79 kg (174 lb)

Sport
- Sport: Swimming
- Strokes: Butterfly
- Club: Dartmouth Crusaders
Medal record
Women's swimming
Representing Canada
Pan American Games
| Bronze medal – third place | 1983 Caracas | 200 m butterfly |

Marie Moore (born May 1, 1967) is a former international butterfly swimmer from Canada. Moore competed at the 1984 Summer Olympics in Los Angeles, California, finishing in 13th position in the women's 200-metre butterfly. A year earlier, she had won a bronze medal in the same event at the 1983 Pan American Games in Caracas, Venezuela.
