= Lisa Ann Wen =

Taiwanese swimmer

Personal information
- Nationality: Taiwanese
- Born: 23 April 1965 (age 61)

Sport
- Sport: Swimming

Lisa Ann Wen (born 23 April 1965) is a Taiwanese freestyle and butterfly swimmer. She competed in four events at the 1984 Summer Olympics.
