= Julie Daigneault =

Canadian swimmer (born 1965)

Personal information
- Full name: Julie Daigneault
- National team: Canada
- Born: June 25, 1965 (age 61) Chomedey, Quebec
- Height: 1.59 m (5 ft 3 in)
- Weight: 52 kg (115 lb)

Sport
- Sport: Swimming
- Strokes: Freestyle
- Club: Pointe-Claire Swim Club
Medal record
Women's swimming
Representing Canada
Pan American Games
Bronze medal – third place	1983 Caracas	200 m freestyle
Bronze medal – third place	1983 Caracas	400 m freestyle
Bronze medal – third place	1983 Caracas	800 m freestyle
Summer Universiade
Bronze medal – third place	1983 Edmonton	400 m freestyle
Bronze medal – third place	1983 Edmonton	800 m freestyle

Julie Daigneault (born June 25, 1965) is a former competition swimmer from Canada who specialized in middle-distance freestyle events. Daigneault competed for her native country at the 1984 Summer Olympics in Los Angeles, California. There she finished in 8th position in the women's 400-metre freestyle and 9th in the 200-metre freestyle. She won three bronze medals at the 1983 Pan American Games in Edmonton, Alberta – in the 200, 400 and 800-metre freestyle events.
