= Maria Guimarães =

Brazilian swimmer (born 1958)

Personal information
- Full name: Maria Elisa Guimarães Zanini
- Born: September 23, 1958 (age 67) Rio de Janeiro, Rio de Janeiro, Brazil
- Height: 1.70 m (5 ft 7 in)
- Weight: 63 kg (139 lb)

Sport
- Sport: Swimming
- Strokes: Freestyle
Medal record
Women's swimming
Representing Brazil
Pan American Games
| Bronze medal – third place | 1975 Mexico City | 4x100m Freestyle |

Maria Elisa Guimarães Zanini (born September 23, 1958, in Rio de Janeiro) is a former international freestyle swimmer from Brazil, who participated in a Summer Olympics for her native country.

At 15 years old, she participated at the inaugural World Aquatics Championships in 1973 Belgrade, where she finished 10th in the 400-metre freestyle, 12th in the 800-metre freestyle, and 15th in the 200-metre freestyle.

She was at the 1975 World Aquatics Championships in Cali. In the 800-metre freestyle, she finished 17th, with a time of 9:34.48, far from her personal best at this moment, the South American record (9:15.77). In the 400-metre freestyle, she finished 17th, with a time of 4:34.89, far from her South American record (4:29.32).

She was at the 1975 Pan American Games, in Mexico City, where she won the bronze medal in the 4×100-metre freestyle. She also finished 5th in the 200-metre freestyle, 5th in the 400-metre freestyle, and 6th in the 800-metre freestyle.

At the 1976 Summer Olympics, in Montreal, she swam the 400-metre and 800-metre freestyle, not reaching the finals.

Participated at the 1978 World Aquatics Championships in West Berlin, where she finished 19th in the 200-metre freestyle, and 34th in the 100-metre freestyle.

She was at the 1979 Pan American Games, in San Juan, where she finished 5th in the 4×100-metre freestyle, 5th in the 4×100-metre medley, 6th in the 200-metre freestyle, and 14th in the 100-metre freestyle.

She broke the South American record of all freestyle races (100,200,400,800 and 1500-metre freestyle). She was the first woman from South America to break the one-minute barrier in the 100-metre freestyle.
