= Irma Huerta =

Mexican swimmer (born 1969)

Personal information
- Full name: Irma Huerta Martinez
- Born: August 19, 1969 (age 57) Mexico
- Height: 1.63 m (5 ft 4 in)
- Weight: 55 kg (121 lb)

Sport
- Sport: Swimming
- Strokes: Freestyle
Medal record
Women's swimming
Representing Mexico
Pan American Games
Bronze medal – third place	1983 Caracas	4x100m freestyle

Irma Huerta (born August 19, 1969) is a former female freestyle swimmer from Mexico. She participated at the 1984 Summer Olympics for her native country. Her best result in Los Angeles, California was the 11th place in the Women's 4 × 100 m Freestyle Relay, alongside Patricia Kohlmann, Teresa Rivera and Rosa Fuentes.
