= Donna McGinnis =

Canadian swimmer

Personal information
- Full name: Donna McGinnis
- National team: Canada
- Born: September 23, 1968 (age 57) Edmonton, Alberta, Canada
- Height: 1.68 m (5 ft 6 in)
- Weight: 52 kg (115 lb)

Sport
- Sport: Swimming
- Strokes: Medley, butterfly, freestyle
- Club: Edmonton Keyano Swim Club
Medal record
Women's swimming
Representing Canada
Commonwealth Games
Gold medal – first place	1986 Edinburgh	200 m butterfly
Silver medal – second place	1986 Edinburgh	4×100 m medley
Bronze medal – third place	1986 Edinburgh	4×200 m freestyle

Donna McGinnis (born September 23, 1968) is a former competitive swimmer who represented Canada at the 1984 Summer Olympics and 1988 Summer Olympics. Her best Olympic finish was sixth place in the 400-metre individual medley in Los Angeles, California. McGinnis won the 200-metre butterfly at the 1986 Commonwealth Games in Edinburgh, Scotland.
