= Shelley Cramer =

US Virgin Islands swimmer (born 1961)

Personal information
- Born: October 21, 1961 (age 64)

Sport
- Sport: Swimming
Medal record
Representing United States Virgin Islands
Central American and Caribbean Games
Gold medal – first place	1978 Medellin	200m freestyle
Gold medal – first place	1982 Havana	200m butterfly

Shelley Cramer (born October 21, 1961) is a former swimmer. She competed at the 1976, 1984 and the 1992 Summer Olympics representing the United States Virgin Islands. She was the first woman to represent the United States Virgin Islands at the Olympics.
