= Teresa Rivera =

Mexican swimmer (born 1966)

Personal information
- Full name: Teresa Rivera Pastrana
- Born: April 24, 1966 (age 60) Mexico
- Height: 1.61 m (5 ft 3 in)
- Weight: 62 kg (137 lb)

Sport
- Sport: Swimming
- Strokes: Freestyle, Backstroke
Medal record
Women's swimming
Representing Mexico
Pan American Games
Bronze medal – third place	1979 San Juan	100m backstroke
Bronze medal – third place	1979 San Juan	4x100m freestyle
Bronze medal – third place	1979 San Juan	4x100m medley
Bronze medal – third place	1983 Caracas	4x100m freestyle
Bronze medal – third place	1983 Caracas	4x100m medley

Teresa Rivera Pastrana (born April 24, 1966) is a former female backstroke and freestyle swimmer from Mexico. She participated in two consecutive Summer Olympics for her native country, starting in 1980. Her best result was a 6th place in the Women's 4 × 100 m Freestyle Relay at the 1980 Summer Olympics in Moscow, Soviet Union. She won three bronze medals at the Panamerican games in 1979. She later retired from swimming and became a teacher teaching Health 101 to Freshmen at the American School Foundation of Mexico City. Also, she is the head of the swimming department swimming at ASF.
