= Swimming at the 1988 Summer Olympics – Women's 100 metre freestyle =

Women's 100 metre freestyle at the Games of the XXIV Olympiad
- Venue: Jamsil Indoor Swimming Pool
- Date: 18 September 1988 (heats); 19 September 1988 (finals)
- Competitors: 58 from 36 nations
- Winning time: 54.93

Medalists
1st place, gold medalist(s)		Kristin Otto	East Germany
2nd place, silver medalist(s)		Zhuang Yong	China
3rd place, bronze medalist(s)		Catherine Plewinski	France

The women's 100 metre freestyle event at the 1988 Summer Olympics took place between 18–19 September at the Jamsil Indoor Swimming Pool in Seoul, South Korea.

== Records ==
Prior to this competition, the existing world and Olympic records were as follows.

World record	Kristin Otto (GDR)	54.73	Madrid, Spain	19 August 1986
Olympic record	Barbara Krause (GDR)	54.79	Moscow, Soviet Union	21 July 1980

== Results ==
=== Heats ===
Rule: The eight fastest swimmers advance to final A (Q), while the next eight to final B (q).

Rank	Heat	Name	Nationality	Time	Notes
1	8	Catherine Plewinski	France	55.53	Q
2	8	Kristin Otto	East Germany	55.80	Q
3	6	Zhuang Yong	China	55.84	Q
4	7	Manuela Stellmach	East Germany	56.14	Q
5	8	Silvia Poll	Costa Rica	56.16	Q, NR
6	7	Karin Brienesse	Netherlands	56.29	Q
7	8	Dara Torres	United States	56.37	Q
8	7	Conny van Bentum	Netherlands	56.50	Q
9	6	Natalia Trefilova	Soviet Union	56.66	q
10	7	Luminița Dobrescu	Romania	56.67	q
11	7	Tamara Costache	Romania	56.79	q
12	6	Karen van Wirdum	Australia	56.84	q
13	6	Mitzi Kremer	United States	56.97	q
14	7	Svetlana Isakova	Soviet Union	57.17	q
15	8	Gitta Jensen	Denmark	57.28	q
16	5	Ayako Nakano	Japan	57.29	q
17	8	Andrea Nugent	Canada	57.33	
18	8	Marie-Thérèse Armentero	Switzerland	57.35	
19	8	Christiane Pielke	West Germany	57.47	
20	6	Jane Kerr	Canada	57.55	
21	5	Eva Nyberg	Sweden	57.57	
22	4	Susie Baumer	Australia	57.76	
23	6	Lou Yaping	China	57.79	
24	7	Natasha Khristova	Bulgaria	57.80	
25	5	Annabelle Cripps	Great Britain	57.81	
26	6	Pia Sørensen	Denmark	57.82	
27	5	Karin Furuhed	Sweden	57.97	
28	5	June Croft	Great Britain	58.19	
29	5	Jacqueline Delord	France	58.22	
30	6	Silvia Persi	Italy	58.22	
31	7	Katja Ziliox	West Germany	58.39	
32	5	Kaori Sasaki	Japan	58.40	
33	5	Senda Gharbi	Tunisia	58.51	
34	4	Adriana Pereira	Brazil	58.53	
35	4	Karen Dieffenthaler	Trinidad and Tobago	58.64	
36	4	Patricia Kohlmann	Mexico	59.05	
37	4	Isabelle Vieira	Brazil	59.15	
38	4	María Rivera	Mexico	59.32	
39	3	Akiko Thomson	Philippines	59.41	
40	4	Bryndís Ólafsdóttir	Iceland	59.56	
41	3	Carolina Mauri	Costa Rica	1:00.14	
42	4	Hung Cee Kay	Hong Kong	1:00.18	
43	3	Kim Eun-jung	South Korea	1:00.39	
44	3	Ana Joselina Fortin	Honduras	1:01.11	
45	3	Fenella Ng	Hong Kong	1:01.27	
46	3	Han Young-hee	South Korea	1:01.55	
47	3	Wang Chi	Chinese Taipei	1:01.72	
48	2	Sabrina Lum	Chinese Taipei	1:02.11	
49	2	Catherine Fogarty	Zimbabwe	1:02.47	
50	2	Veronica Cummings	Guam	1:02.63	
51	2	Angela Birch	Fiji	1:02.91	
52	2	Cina Munch	Fiji	1:03.06	
53	1	Carolina Araujo	Mozambique	1:05.11	
54	1	Katerine Moreno	Bolivia	1:05.39	
55	3	Elsa Freire	Angola	1:05.47	
56	2	Nancy Khalaf	Lebanon	1:06.73	
57	2	Carla Fernandes	Angola	1:08.15	
	1	Rita Jean Garay	Puerto Rico	DNS	

=== Finals ===
==== Final B ====
Rank	Lane	Name	Nationality	Time	Notes
9	4	Natalia Trefilova	Soviet Union	56.48	
10	8	Ayako Nakano	Japan	56.72	
11	5	Luminița Dobrescu	Romania	56.79	
12	2	Mitzi Kremer	United States	56.83	
13	1	Gitta Jensen	Denmark	57.02	
14	6	Karen van Wirdum	Australia	57.04	
15	7	Svetlana Isakova	Soviet Union	57.07	
16	3	Tamara Costache	Romania	57.11	

==== Final A ====
Rank	Lane	Name	Nationality	Time	Notes
1st place, gold medalist(s)	5	Kristin Otto	East Germany	54.93	
2nd place, silver medalist(s)	3	Zhuang Yong	China	55.47	
3rd place, bronze medalist(s)	4	Catherine Plewinski	France	55.49	
4	6	Manuela Stellmach	East Germany	55.52	
5	2	Silvia Poll	Costa Rica	55.90	NR
6	7	Karin Brienesse	Netherlands	56.15	
7	1	Dara Torres	United States	56.25	
8	8	Conny van Bentum	Netherlands	56.54	
