= Swimming at the 1988 Summer Olympics – Women's 50 metre freestyle =

Women's 50 metre freestyle at the Games of the XXIV Olympiad
- Venue: Jamsil Indoor Swimming Pool
- Date: 25 September 1988 (heats & finals)
- Competitors: 50 from 33 nations
- Winning time: 25.49 OR

Medalists
1st place, gold medalist(s)		Kristin Otto	East Germany
2nd place, silver medalist(s)		Yang Wenyi	China
3rd place, bronze medalist(s)		Katrin Meissner	East Germany
3rd place, bronze medalist(s)		Jill Sterkel	United States

The inaugural women's 50 metre freestyle event at the 1988 Summer Olympics took place on 25 September at the Jamsil Indoor Swimming Pool in Seoul, South Korea.

== Records ==
Prior to this competition, the existing world and Olympic records were as follows.

World record	Yang Wenyi (CHN)	24.98	Guangzhou, China	11 April 1988
Olympic record	Inaugural event	—	—	—

The following records were established during the competition:

Date	Round	Name	Nationality	Time	Record
25 September	Heat 7	Yang Wenyi	China	25.67	OR
25 September	Final A	Kristin Otto	East Germany	25.49	OR

== Results ==
=== Heats ===
Rule: The eight fastest swimmers advance to final A (Q), while the next eight to final B (q).

Rank	Heat	Name	Nationality	Time	Notes
1	7	Yang Wenyi	China	25.67	Q, OR
2	7	Katrin Meissner	East Germany	25.77	Q
3	6	Kristin Otto	East Germany	25.85	Q
4	5	Leigh Ann Fetter	United States	25.91	Q
5	6	Catherine Plewinski	France	26.01	Q, NR
6	7	Jill Sterkel	United States	26.02	Q
7	6	Tamara Costache	Romania	26.06	Q
8	7	Karen van Wirdum	Australia	26.12	Q, OC
9	7	Marion Aizpors	West Germany	26.20	q
10	7	Inna Abramova	Soviet Union	26.27	q
11	5	Marie-Thérèse Armentero	Switzerland	26.32	q
12	5	Christiane Pielke	West Germany	26.33	q
13	6	Ayako Nakano	Japan	26.44	q
14	4	Diana van der Plaats	Netherlands	26.49	q, NR
15	6	Kristin Topham	Canada	26.50	q
16	5	Karin Brienesse	Netherlands	26.54	q
17	4	Adriana Pereira	Brazil	26.56	
17	5	Luminița Dobrescu	Romania	26.56	
19	6	Andrea Nugent	Canada	26.60	
20	5	Gitta Jensen	Denmark	26.61	
20	5	Kaori Sasaki	Japan	26.61	
22	6	Xia Fujie	China	26.66	
23	7	Helena Aberg	Sweden	26.67	
24	6	Karin Furuhed	Sweden	26.85	
25	7	Alison Sheppard	Great Britain	27.14	
26	4	María Rivera	Mexico	27.16	
27	4	Annabelle Cripps	Great Britain	27.17	
28	4	Karen Dieffenthaler	Trinidad and Tobago	27.27	
29	5	Senda Gharbi	Tunisia	27.34	
30	4	Akiko Thomson	Philippines	27.43	
31	3	Mônica Rezende	Brazil	27.44	
32	4	Patricia Kohlmann	Mexico	27.45	
33	2	Carolina Mauri	Costa Rica	27.96	
34	3	Han Young-hee	South Korea	28.02	
35	3	Hung Cee Kay	Hong Kong	28.15	
36	3	Park Joo-li	South Korea	28.20	
37	2	Bryndís Ólafsdóttir	Iceland	28.38	
38	3	Ana Joselina Fortin	Honduras	28.46	
39	2	Cina Munch	Fiji	28.55	
40	2	Catherine Fogarty	Zimbabwe	28.66	
41	3	Wang Chi	Chinese Taipei	28.73	
42	2	Sabrina Lum	Chinese Taipei	28.82	
43	2	Veronica Cummings	Guam	28.94	
44	2	Angela Birch	Fiji	29.01	
45	3	Tsang Wing Sze	Hong Kong	29.14	
46	2	Katerine Moreno	Bolivia	29.42	
47	4	Elsa Freire	Angola	29.54	
48	1	Carolina Araujo	Mozambique	29.64	
49	3	Ana Martins	Angola	29.74	
50	1	Nancy Khalaf	Lebanon	30.77	

=== Finals ===
==== Final B ====
Rank	Lane	Name	Nationality	Time	Notes
9	4	Marion Aizpors	West Germany	26.17	
10	6	Christiane Pielke	West Germany	26.22	
11	3	Marie-Thérèse Armentero	Switzerland	26.34	
12	1	Kristin Topham	Canada	26.45	
12	2	Ayako Nakano	Japan	26.45	
14	5	Inna Abramova	Soviet Union	26.48	
15	8	Karin Brienesse	Netherlands	26.66	
16	7	Diana van der Plaats	Netherlands	26.80	

==== Final A ====
Rank	Lane	Name	Nationality	Time	Notes
1st place, gold medalist(s)	3	Kristin Otto	East Germany	25.49	OR
2nd place, silver medalist(s)	4	Yang Wenyi	China	25.64	
3rd place, bronze medalist(s)	5	Katrin Meissner	East Germany	25.71	
3rd place, bronze medalist(s)	7	Jill Sterkel	United States	25.71	
5	6	Leigh Ann Fetter	United States	25.78	
6	1	Tamara Costache	Romania	25.80	
7	2	Catherine Plewinski	France	25.90	NR
8	8	Karen van Wirdum	Australia	26.01	OC
