= Swimming at the 1988 Summer Olympics – Women's 200 metre freestyle =

Women's 200 metre freestyle at the Games of the XXIV Olympiad
- Venue: Jamsil Indoor Swimming Pool
- Date: 20 September 1988 (heats); 21 September 1988 (finals)
- Competitors: 45 from 30 nations
- Winning time: 1:57.65 OR

Medalists
1st place, gold medalist(s)		Heike Friedrich	East Germany
2nd place, silver medalist(s)		Silvia Poll	Costa Rica
3rd place, bronze medalist(s)		Manuela Stellmach	East Germany

The women's 200 metre freestyle event at the 1988 Summer Olympics took place between 20–21 September at the Jamsil Indoor Swimming Pool in Seoul, South Korea.

== Records ==
Prior to this competition, the existing world and Olympic records were as follows.

World record	Heike Friedrich (GDR)	1:57.55	East Berlin, East Germany	18 June 1986
Olympic record	Barbara Krause (GDR)	1:58.33	Moscow, Soviet Union	24 July 1980

The following records were established during the competition:

Date	Round	Name	Nationality	Time	Record
21 September	Final A	Heike Friedrich	East Germany	1:57.65	OR

== Results ==
=== Heats ===
Rule: The eight fastest swimmers advance to final A (Q), while the next eight to final B (q).

Rank	Heat	Name	Nationality	Time	Notes
1	6	Heike Friedrich	East Germany	1:59.02	Q
2	5	Silvia Poll	Costa Rica	1:59.22	Q, NR
3	6	Mary Wayte	United States	1:59.50	Q
4	5	Manuela Stellmach	East Germany	2:00.30	Q
5	4	Natalia Trefilova	Soviet Union	2:00.54	Q
6	5	Stephanie Ortwig	West Germany	2:00.66	Q
7	4	Mitzi Kremer	United States	2:01.45	Q
8	5	Cécile Prunier	France	2:01.60	Q
9	5	Chikako Nakamori	Japan	2:01.76	q
10	4	Mette Jacobsen	Denmark	2:01.80	q
11	6	Luminița Dobrescu	Romania	2:01.93	q
12	4	Ruth Gilfillan	Great Britain	2:02.11	q
13	4	Stela Pura	Romania	2:02.26	q
14	6	Patricia Noall	Canada	2:02.31	q
15	5	Zhuang Yong	China	2:02.40	q
16	1	Birgit Lohberg-Schulz	West Germany	2:02.77	q
17	3	Diana van der Plaats	Netherlands	2:03.02	
18	6	Isabelle Arnould	Belgium	2:03.32	
18	6	Suzanne Nilsson	Sweden	2:03.32	
20	5	Sheridan Burge-Lopez	Australia	2:03.42	
21	6	June Croft	Great Britain	2:03.63	
22	4	Karin Brienesse	Netherlands	2:04.36	
23	5	Silvia Persi	Italy	2:04.40	
24	4	Annette Jørgensen	Denmark	2:04.71	
25	3	Patrícia Amorim	Brazil	2:04.74	
26	4	Susie Baumer	Australia	2:04.82	
27	3	Nurul Huda Abdullah	Malaysia	2:04.85	
28	6	Jane Kerr	Canada	2:04.92	
29	3	Kaori Sasaki	Japan	2:04.92	
30	3	Senda Gharbi	Tunisia	2:06.60	
31	3	Karen Dieffenthaler	Trinidad and Tobago	2:07.09	NR
32	2	Bryndís Ólafsdóttir	Iceland	2:07.11	
33	3	Rita Jean Garay	Puerto Rico	2:07.44	
34	2	Natasha Aguilar	Costa Rica	2:10.22	
35	3	Patricia Kohlmann	Mexico	2:10.36	
36	2	Fenella Ng	Hong Kong	2:10.43	
37	2	Kim Eun-jung	South Korea	2:10.85	
38	2	Chang Hui-chien	Chinese Taipei	2:11.50	
39	2	Park Joo-li	South Korea	2:11.53	
40	2	Qian Hong	China	2:12.44	
41	1	Catherine Fogarty	Zimbabwe	2:13.44	
42	2	Hung Cee Kay	Hong Kong	2:13.61	
43	1	Angela Birch	Fiji	2:16.79	
44	1	Cina Munch	Fiji	2:18.45	
	1	Nancy Khalaf	Lebanon	DNS	

=== Finals ===
==== Final B ====
Rank	Lane	Name	Nationality	Time	Notes
9	7	Patricia Noall	Canada	2:00.77	
10	6	Ruth Gilfillan	Great Britain	2:01.66	
11	5	Mette Jacobsen	Denmark	2:01.84	
12	3	Luminița Dobrescu	Romania	2:01.98	
13	2	Stela Pura	Romania	2:02.30	
14	4	Chikako Nakamori	Japan	2:02.31	
15	8	Birgit Lohberg-Schulz	West Germany	2:02.32	
16	1	Zhuang Yong	China	2:14.23	

==== Final A ====
Rank	Lane	Name	Nationality	Time	Notes
1st place, gold medalist(s)	4	Heike Friedrich	East Germany	1:57.65	OR
2nd place, silver medalist(s)	5	Silvia Poll	Costa Rica	1:58.67	NR
3rd place, bronze medalist(s)	6	Manuela Stellmach	East Germany	1:59.01	
4	3	Mary Wayte	United States	1:59.04	
5	2	Natalia Trefilova	Soviet Union	1:59.24	
6	1	Mitzi Kremer	United States	2:00.23	
7	7	Stephanie Ortwig	West Germany	2:00.73	
8	8	Cécile Prunier	France	2:02.88	
