= Swimming at the 1988 Summer Olympics – Women's 4 × 100 metre freestyle relay =

Women's 4 × 100 metre freestyle relay at the Games of the XXIV Olympiad
- Venue: Jamsil Indoor Swimming Pool
- Date: 22 September 1988 (heats & final)
- Competitors: 60 from 15 nations
- Teams: 15
- Winning time: 3:40.63 OR

Medalists
1st place, gold medalist(s)		Kristin Otto, Katrin Meissner, Daniela Hunger, Manuela Stellmach, Sabina Schulze*, Heike Friedrich*	East Germany
2nd place, silver medalist(s)		Marianne Muis, Mildred Muis, Conny van Bentum, Karin Brienesse, Diana van der Plaats*	Netherlands
3rd place, bronze medalist(s)		Mary Wayte, Mitzi Kremer, Laura Walker, Dara Torres, Paige Zemina*, Jill Sterkel*; *Indicates the swimmer only competed in the preliminary heats.	United States

The women's 4 × 100 metre freestyle relay event at the 1988 Summer Olympics took place on 22 September at the Jamsil Indoor Swimming Pool in Seoul, South Korea.

== Records ==
Prior to this competition, the existing world and Olympic records were as follows.

World record	East Germany (GDR); Kristin Otto (54.73); Manuela Stellmach (54.96); Sabina Schulze (55.52); Heike Friedrich (55.36)	3:40.57	Madrid, Spain	19 August 1986
Olympic record	East Germany; Barbara Krause (54.90); Caren Metschuck (55.61); Ines Diers (55.90); Sarina Hülsenbeck (56.30)	3:42.71	Moscow, Soviet Union	27 July 1980

The following new world and Olympic records were set during this competition.

Date	Event	Name	Nationality	Time	Record
22 September	Final	Kristin Otto (55.11); Katrin Meissner (54.73); Daniela Hunger (55.69); Manuela Stellmach (55.10)	East Germany	3:40.63	OR

== Results ==
=== Heats ===
Rule: The eight fastest teams advance to the final (Q).

Rank	Heat	Nation	Swimmers	Time	Notes
1	1	East Germany	Katrin Meissner (55.30); Sabina Schulze (56.32); Heike Friedrich (55.68); Daniela Hunger (55.83)	3:43.13	Q
2	2	Netherlands	Conny van Bentum (56.34); Marianne Muis (55.96); Mildred Muis (55.85); Diana van der Plaats (55.97)	3:44.12	Q
3	2	United States	Laura Walker (57.46); Paige Zemina (56.51); Jill Sterkel (56.07); Mary Wayte (55.06)	3:45.10	Q
4	1	Soviet Union	Inna Abramova (57.56); Svetlana Isakova (56.55); Yelena Dendeberova (56.02); Svitlana Kopchykova (56.15)	3:46.28	Q
5	2	China	Xia Fujie (57.37); Lou Yaping (57.23); Yang Wenyi (55.86); Zhuang Yong (55.90)	3:46.36	Q
6	1	West Germany	Karin Seick (57.54); Christiane Pielke (56.94); Katja Ziliox (57.75); Marion Aizpors (55.80)	3:48.03	Q
7	2	Denmark	Mette Jacobsen (57.10); Gitta Jensen (56.85); Pia Sørensen (56.93); Annette Jørgensen (57.95)	3:48.83	Q
8	2	Canada	Kathy Bald (57.29); Kristin Topham (58.08); Allison Higson (57.09); Jane Kerr (56.74)	3:49.20	Q
9	1	Sweden	Agneta Eriksson (58.31); Karin Furuhed (57.31); Suzanne Nilsson (57.59); Eva Nyberg (57.29)	3:50.50	
10	1	Great Britain	Annabelle Cripps (57.87); June Croft (57.70); Linda Donnelly (58.01); Joanna Coull (57.26)	3:50.84	
11	2	Brazil	Adriana Pereira (58.59); Monica Rezende (59.37); Patrícia Amorim (59.92); Isabelle Vieira (58.41)	3:56.29	
12	1	Costa Rica	Natasha Aguilar (1:01.45); Marcela Cuesta (1:00.07); Carolina Mauri (1:00.25); Silvia Poll (57.90)	3:59.67	
13	2	South Korea	Kim Eun-jung (1:01.33); Han Young-hee (1:00.37); Park Joo-li (1:01.42); Lee Hong-mi (1:00.06)	4:03.18	
14	2	Hong Kong	Hung Cee Kay (1:00.80); Fenella Ng (1:01.15); Tsang Wing Sze (1:03.67); Annemarie Munk (1:02.96)	4:08.58	
15	1	Chinese Taipei	Wang Chi (1:02.17); Sabrina Lum (1:03.31); Carwai Seto (1:01.82); Chang Hui-chien (1:02.54)	4:09.84	

=== Final ===
Rank	Lane	Nation	Swimmers	Time	Notes
1st place, gold medalist(s)	4	East Germany	Kristin Otto (55.11); Katrin Meissner (54.73); Daniela Hunger (55.69); Manuela Stellmach (55.10)	3:40.63	OR
2nd place, silver medalist(s)	5	Netherlands	Marianne Muis (56.26); Mildred Muis (56.36); Conny van Bentum (55.73); Diana van der Plaats (55.04)	3:43.39	NR
3rd place, bronze medalist(s)	3	United States	Mary Wayte (55.88); Mitzi Kremer (55.68); Laura Walker (56.71); Dara Torres (55.98)	3:44.25	
4	2	China	Xia Fujie (57.78); Yang Wenyi (55.38); Lou Yaping (57.28); Zhuang Yong (54.25)	3:44.69	NR
5	6	Soviet Union	Yelena Dendeberova (56.49); Svetlana Isakova (56.20); Natalia Trefilova (56.00); Svitlana Kopchykova (56.30)	3:44.99	
6	8	Canada	Kathy Bald (57.01); Patricia Noall (56.75); Andrea Nugent (56.31); Jane Kerr (56.68)	3:46.75	
7	7	West Germany	Stephanie Ortwig (57.91); Marion Aizpors (55.71); Christiane Pielke (56.46); Karin Seick (56.82)	3:46.90	
8	1	Denmark	Gitta Jensen (56.93); Pia Sørensen (57.28); Mette Jacobsen (56.95); Annette Jørgensen (58.09)	3:49.25	
