= Swimming at the 1991 World Aquatics Championships – Women's 100 metre freestyle =

Women's 100 metre freestyle at the 1991 FINA World Championships
- Dates: 7 January 1991 (heats); 7 January 1991 (final B); 7 January 1991 (final A)
- Competitors: 36
- Winning time: 55.17 seconds

Medalists
gold medal	Nicole Haislett	United States
silver medal	Catherine Plewinski	France
bronze medal	Zhuang Yong	China

The women's 100 metre freestyle event at the 1991 World Aquatics Championships took place 7 January.

== Results ==
=== Heats ===
The heats were held on 7 January at 10:03.

Rank	Swimmer	Nation	Time	Notes
1	Catherine Plewinski	France	55.61	
2	Nicole Haislett	United States	56.09	
3	Yevgeniya Yermakova	Soviet Union	56.55	
4	Zhuang Yong	China	56.67	
5	Simone Osygus	Germany	56.82	
6	Karin Brienesse	Netherlands	56.86	
7	Manuela Stellmach	Germany	56.96	
8	Julie Cooper	United States	56.98	
9	Suzu Chiba	Japan	56.99	
10	Wang Xiaohong	China	57.01	
11	Gitta Jensen	Denmark	57.29	
12	Inge de Bruijn	Netherlands	57.37	
13	Susie O'Neill	Australia	57.40	
14	Karen van Wirdum	Australia	57.52	
15	Toni Jeffs	New Zealand	57.60	
16	Luminița Dobrescu	Romania	57.62	
17	Jacqueline Delord	France	58.10	
18	Silvia Persi	Italy	58.13	
19	Karen Pickering	United Kingdom	58.10	
20	Silvia Poll	Costa Rica	58.22	
21	Ilaria Sciorelli	Italy	58.42	
22	Laura Sánchez	Mexico	58.63	
23	Annette Poulsen	Denmark	58.60	
24	María Rivera	Mexico	59.05	
25	Tea Cerkverik	Yugoslavia	59.09	
26	Annika Nilsson	Sweden	59.17	
27	Lejia Kucukalic	Yugoslavia	59.48	
28	Anne Boivoisin	Belgium	59.61	
29	Sharon Page	United Kingdom	59.82	
30	Timea Toth	Israel	1:00.85	
31	Tamara Costache	Romania	1:00.96	
32	Hung Cee Kay	Hong Kong	1:01.00	
33	Elsa Manora Nasution	Indonesia	1:01.54	
34	Yeyen Gunawan	Indonesia	1:01.66	
35	Veronica Cummings	Guam	1:02.99	
36	Sara Casadei	San Marino	1:07.11	
-	Senda Gharbi	Tunisia	DNS	
-	Eva Nyberg	Sweden	DNS	

=== Finals ===
==== Final B ====
The final B was held on 7 January at 19:39.

Rank	Name	Nationality	Time	Notes
9	Susie O'Neill	Australia	56.20	
10	Inge de Bruijn	Netherlands	56.58	
11	Suzu Chiba	Japan	56.63	
12	Luminița Dobrescu	Romania	56.90	
13	Karen van Wirdum	Australia	57.08	
14	Jacqueline Delord	France	57.57	
15	Silvia Persi	Italy	57.66	
16	Toni Jeffs	New Zealand	57.85	

==== Final A ====
The final A was held on 7 January at 19:34.

Rank	Name	Nationality	Time	Notes
1st place, gold medalist(s)	Nicole Haislett	United States	55.17	
2nd place, silver medalist(s)	Catherine Plewinski	France	55.31	
3rd place, bronze medalist(s)	Zhuang Yong	China	55.65	
4	Karin Brienesse	Netherlands	56.34	
5	Manuela Stellmach	Germany	56.45	
6	Simone Osygus	Germany	56.55	
7	Yevgeniya Yermakova	Soviet Union	56.56	
8	Julie Cooper	United States	56.66	
