= Swimming at the 1991 World Aquatics Championships – Women's 50 metre freestyle =

Women's 50 metre freestyle at the 1991 World Aquatics Championships
- Location: Perth, Australia
- Dates: 13 January (heats and final)
- Winning time: 25.47

Medalists
gold medal	Zhuang Yong China
silver medal	Catherine Plewinski France; Leigh Ann Fetter United States

The Men's 50 metre freestyle competition at the 1991 World Aquatics Championships were held on January 12, 1991.

== Records ==
Prior to the competition, the existing world and championship records were as follows.

World record	Yang Wenyi (CHN)	24.98	Guangzhou, China	11 April 1988
Competition record	Tamara Costache (ROU)	25.28	Madrid, Spain	1986

== Results ==
=== Heats ===
The heats was held on 12 January at 11:25.

Rank	Heat	Lane	Name	Nationality	Time	Notes
1	3	5	Catherine Plewinski	France	25.77	
2	3	4	Yong Zhuang	China	25.94	
3	5	5	Simone Osygus	Germany	25.99	
4	4	5	Jenny Thompson	United States	26.01	
5	4	4	Leigh Ann Fetter	United States	26.09	
6	3	6	Yevgeniya Yermakova	Soviet Union	26.17	
7	5	4	Yang Wenyi	China	26.26	
8	4	3	Daniela Hunger	Germany	26.27	
9	5	3	Karen van Wirdum	Australia	26.56	
10	4	7	Tonni Jeffs	New Zealand	26.59	
11	5	1	Louise Karlsson	Sweden	26.62	
12	3	3	Karin Brienesse	Netherlands	26.63	
13	5	2	Liliana Dobrescu	Romania	26.69	
14	5	6	Marieke Mastenbroek	Netherlands	26.70	
15	3	2	Susie O'Neill	Australia	26.88	
16	4	1	Maria Soledad Rivera	Mexico	26.91	
17	2	5	Silvia Poll	Costa Rica	26.92	
18	3	1	Silvia Persi	Italy	26.99	
19	5	8	Gitta Jensen	Denmark	27.00	
20	4	2	Lejla Kucukalic	Yugoslavia	27.04	
21	4	6	Tamara Costache	Romania	27.16	
22	5	7	Suzu Chiba	Japan	27.17	
23	2	4	Tea Cerkverik	Yugoslavia	27.24	
24	3	1	Karen Pickering	Great Britain	27.27	
25	4	8	Ilaria Sciorelli	Italy	27.38	
26	2	1	Gabriela Gaja	Mexico	27.45	
27	2	7	Anne Boivoisin	Belgium	27.52	
28	2	3	Annika Nilsson	Sweden	27.61	
29	2	2	Sze Ki Celeste Hung	Hong Kong	27.71	
30	1	4	Trude Aasbo	Norway	27.86	
31	2	6	Maren Johannesen	Norway	28.12	
32	1	5	Yeyen Gunawan	Indonesia	28.40	
33	1	3	Veronica Cummings	Guam	29.24	
	3	7	Senda Al-Gharbi	Tunisia	DNS	

=== Finals ===
==== Final B ====
Rank	Lane	Name	Nationality	Time	Notes
9	4	Karen van Wirdum	Australia	26.54	
10	5	Tonni Jeffs	New Zealand	26.61	
11	6	Karin Brienesse	Netherlands	26.72	
12	2	Liliana Dobrescu	Romania	26.74	
13	8	Maria Soledad Rivera	Mexico	26.75	
14	3	Louise Karlsson	Sweden	26.83	
15	7	Marieke Mastenbroek	Netherlands	26.88	
16	1	Susie O'Neill	Australia	27.05	

==== Final A ====
Rank	Lane	Name	Nationality	Time	Notes
1st place, gold medalist(s)	5	Yong Zhuang	China	25.47	
2nd place, silver medalist(s)	4	Catherine Plewinski	France	25.50	
2nd place, silver medalist(s)	2	Leigh Ann Fetter	United States	25.50	
4	6	Jenny Thompson	United States	25.87	
4	1	Yang Wenyi	China	25.87	
6	3	Simone Osygus	Germany	25.95	
7	7	Yevgeniya Yermakova	Soviet Union	26.00	
8	8	Daniela Hunger	Germany	26.01	
