= Swimming at the 1987 Pan American Games – Women's 50 metre freestyle =

Women's 50 metre freestyle at the 1987 Pan American Games
- Venue: Indiana University Natatorium
- Dates: August 15 (preliminaries and finals)
- Competitors: from - nations

Medalists
Gold medal	Jenny Thompson	United States
Silver medal	Silvia Poll	Costa Rica
Bronze medal	Jeanne Doolan	United States

The women's 50 metre freestyle competition of the swimming events at the 1987 Pan American Games took place on 15 August at the Indiana University Natatorium. It was the first appearance of this event in the Pan American Games.

This race consisted of one length of the pool in freestyle.

== Results ==
All times are in minutes and seconds.

KEY:	q	Fastest non-qualifiers	Q	Qualified	GR	Games record	NR	National record	PB	Personal best	SB	Seasonal best

=== Final ===
The final was held on August 15.

Rank	Name	Nationality	Time	Notes
1st place, gold medalist(s)	Jenny Thompson	United States	26.09	GR
2nd place, silver medalist(s)	Silvia Poll	Costa Rica	26.32	NR
3rd place, bronze medalist(s)	Jeanne Doolan	United States	26.34	
4	Karen Dieffenthaler	Trinidad and Tobago	27.16	
5	Adriana Pereira	Brazil	27.17	
6	Cheryl McArton	Canada	27.18	
7	Virginia Sachero	Argentina	27.18	
8	Ana Rios	Puerto Rico	27.88	
