= Swimming at the 1987 Pan American Games – Women's 200 metre freestyle =

Women's 200 metre freestyle at the 1987 Pan American Games
- Venue: Indiana University Natatorium
- Dates: August 10 (preliminaries and finals)
- Competitors: from - nations

Medalists
Gold medal	Silvia Poll	Costa Rica
Silver medal	Whitney Hedgepeth	United States
Bronze medal	Sara Linke	United States

The women's 200 metre freestyle competition of the swimming events at the 1987 Pan American Games took place on 10 August at the Indiana University Natatorium. The last Pan American Games champion was Cynthia Woodhead of US.

This race consisted of four lengths of the pool, all in freestyle.

== Results ==
All times are in minutes and seconds.

KEY:	q	Fastest non-qualifiers	Q	Qualified	GR	Games record	NR	National record	PB	Personal best	SB	Seasonal best

=== Final ===
The final was held on August 10.

Rank	Name	Nationality	Time	Notes
1st place, gold medalist(s)	Silvia Poll	Costa Rica	2:00.02	NR
2nd place, silver medalist(s)	Whitney Hedgepeth	United States	2:02.06	
3rd place, bronze medalist(s)	Sara Linke	United States	2:04.00	
4	Denise Gereghty	Canada	2:05.64	
5	Patrícia Amorim	Brazil	2:05.70	
6	Karen Dieffenthaler	Trinidad and Tobago	2:07.15	
7	Sally Gilbert	Canada	2:08.66	
8	Miriam Artur	Brazil	2:10.02	
