= List of Costa Rican records in swimming =

This is a list of national swimming records for Costa Rica. These are the fastest times ever swum by a Costa Rican swimmer.

These records are kept by Costa Rica's national swimming federation: Federación Costarricense de Deportes Acuáticos (FECODA).

== Long Course (50 m) ==
=== Men ===
Event	Time		Name	Club	Date	Meet	Location	Ref
50 m freestyle	23.49		Alberto Vega	Belen	6 April 2024	Dominican Swim Open	Dominican Republic	
100 m freestyle	50.40	h	Mario Montoya	BELEN	29 July 2009	World Championships	Rome, Italy	
200 m freestyle	1:51.30	h	Mario Montoya	BELEN	27 July 2009	World Championships	Rome, Italy	
400 m freestyle	4:00.20		Jaime Lipszyc	ACANA	November 1993	Central American and Caribbean Games	Ponce, Puerto Rico	
800 m freestyle	8:23.58		Mario Montoya	Turabo	12 April 2011	Justas de Campeonato	Ponce, Puerto Rico	
800 m freestyle	8:23.38	#	Alberto Vega	CN Antibes	15 March 2026	Southern Region Championships	Saint-Raphaël, France	
1500 m freestyle	15:47.92		Jaime Lipszyc	ACANA	November 1993	Central American and Caribbean Games	Ponce, Puerto Rico	
50m backstroke	27.01	b	Guido Montero	Costa Rica	28 June 2023	CAC Games	San Salvador, El Salvador	
50m backstroke	26.77	not ratified	Julio Perez	Costa Rica	20 May 2021	Puerto Rican International Open	Salinas, Puerto Rico	
100m backstroke	57.45	not ratified	Julio Perez	Costa Rica	17 December 2020	Paraguayan Championships	Asunción, Paraguay	
200m backstroke	2:05.14	b	Julio Perez	Costa Rica	27 June 2023 (Note: by official result source; 28 June 2023 by FECODA source, a typo)	CAC Games	San Salvador, El Salvador	
200m backstroke	2:05.13	not ratified	Julio Perez	Costa Rica	22 May 2021	Puerto Rican International Open	Salinas, Puerto Rico	
50m breaststroke	29.18		Esteban Cruz	Costa Rica	24 November 2022			
100m breaststroke	1:04.10		Esteban Cruz	Costa Rica	24 November 2022			
200m breaststroke	2:19.71		Arnoldo Herrera	Costa Rica	18 December 2020	Paraguayan Championships	Asunción, Paraguay	
50m butterfly	24.91	h	Bryan Alvaréz	BELEN	20 July 2018	-		
100m butterfly	55.50		Bryan Alvaréz	Costa Rica	7 August 2019	-		
100m butterfly	55.32	not ratified	Bryan Alvaréz	Costa Rica	6 December 2017	Central American Games	Managua, Nicaragua	
200m butterfly	2:03.49		Bryan Alvaréz	BELEN	20 July 2018	-		
200m individual medley	2:08.63		Andrey Aguilar	TENNIS CLUB	August 1982	-	Guayaquil, Ecuador	
400m individual medley	4:31.52	h	Esteban Araya	Costa Rica	16 July 2015	Pan American Games	Toronto, Canada	
4 × 100 m freestyle relay	3:32.78		Adrian Vargas (52.80); Julio Perez (53.55); Alberto Vega (53.53); Guido Montero (52.90)	Costa Rica	25 June 2023	CAC Games	San Salvador, El Salvador	
4 × 200 m freestyle relay	7:47.35		Emiliano Fallas (1:56.48); Javier Vargas (1:59.03); Miguel Serrano (1:57.18); Alberto Vega (1:54.66)	Costa Rica	17 October 2025	Central American Games	Guatemala City, Guatemala	
4 × 100 m medley relay	3:53.97		Guido Montero (58.91); Esteban Cruz (1:03.94); Alberto Vega (57.50); Adrian Vargas (52.62)	Costa Rica	29 June 2023	CAC Games	San Salvador, El Salvador	

Legend: # – Record awaiting ratification by FECONA; WR – World record; AM – Americas record;
Records not set in finals: h – heat; sf – semifinal; r – relay 1st leg; rh – relay heat 1st leg; b – B final; † – en route to final mark; tt – time trial

=== Women ===
Event	Time		Name	Club	Date	Meet	Location	Ref
50m freestyle	26.32	not ratified	Silvia Poll	Cariari	July 1987			
100m freestyle	55.52	not ratified	Silvia Poll	Cariari	11 August 1987	Pan American Games	Indianapolis, United States	
200m freestyle	1:57.48		Claudia Poll	Cariari	10 August 1997	Pan Pacific Championships	Fukuoka, Japan	
400m freestyle	4:09.61		Claudia Poll	Cariari	12/15 August 1993	Pan Pacific Championships	Kobe, Japan	
800m freestyle	8:33.80		Claudia Poll	Cariari	12/15 August 1993	Pan Pacific Championships	Kobe, Japan	
1500m freestyle	17:08.15	not ratified	Helena Moreno	Costa Rica	6 December 2017	Central American Games	Managua, Nicaragua	
50m backstroke	30.15	not ratified	Silvia Poll	Cariari	July 1989	Bellinzona	Bellinzona, Switzerland	
100m backstroke	1:01.86	not ratified	Silvia Poll	Cariari	14 August 1987	Pan American Games	Indianapolis, United States	
200m backstroke	2:11.66		Silvia Poll	Cariari	31 July 1992	Olympic Games	Barcelona, Spain	
50m breaststroke	33.90		Adriana Morera	Costa Rica	9 December 2015	Campeonato Interclubes de Natación		
100m breaststroke	1:14.62		Adriana Morera	Costa Rica	15 April 2018	Campeonato FEDONA	Santo Domingo, Dominican Republic	
200m breaststroke	2:39.38	not ratified	Sandra Arroyo	Cariari	1 November 1993	-		
50m butterfly	27.27		Beatriz Padrón	Costa Rica	20 June 2024	CCCAN Championships	Monterrey, Mexico	
100m butterfly	1:00.81		Marie Meza	Costa Rica	8 February 2016	-		
200m butterfly	2:13.25	h	Alondra Ortiz	University of Houston	11 April 2024	TYR Pro Swim Series	San Antonio, United States	
200m individual medley	2:18.37		Claudia Poll	Cariari	18 February 1993	-		
400m individual medley	4:50.35		Claudia Poll	Cariari	1 July 1992	-		
4 × 100 m freestyle relay	3:55.43		Silvia Poll (55.52); Natasha Aguilar; Marcela Cuesta; Carolina Mauri	Costa Rica	11 August 1987	Pan American Games	Indianapolis, United States	
4 × 200 m freestyle relay	8:24.25		Silvia Poll (1:58.36); Natasha Aguilar; Marcela Cuesta; Carolina Mauri	Costa Rica	9 August 1987	Pan American Games	Indianapolis, United States	
4 × 100 m medley relay	4:23.11		Silvia Poll (1:01.86); Montserrat Hidalgo; Marcela Cuesta; Carolina Mauri	Costa Rica	14 August 1987	Pan American Games	Indianapolis, United States	

Legend: # – Record awaiting ratification by FECONA; WR – World record; AM – Americas record;
Records not set in finals: h – heat; sf – semifinal; r – relay 1st leg; rh – relay heat 1st leg; b – B final; † – en route to final mark; tt – time trial

=== Mixed relay ===
Event	Time	Name	Nationality	Date	Meet	Location	Ref
4 × 50 m freestyle relay	1:44.63	Sofia Hernandez; Daniela Navarrete; Antonio González; Felipe Jimenez	Costa Rica	28 June 2017	CCCAN	Port of Spain, Trinidad and Tobago	
4 × 100 m freestyle relay	3:47.91	Adrian Vargas (53.72); Maria Rodriguez (1:01.95); Guido Montero (52.84); Maria Padron (59.40)	Costa Rica	27 June 2023	CAC Games	San Salvador, El Salvador	
4 × 50 m medley relay							
4 × 100 m medley relay	4:05.06	Julio Perez (57.82); Esteban Cruz (1:04.16); Yanin Ortiz (1:02.27); Maria Rodriguez (1:00.81)	Costa Rica	24 June 2023	CAC Games	San Salvador, El Salvador	

Legend: # – Record awaiting ratification by FECONA;
Records not set in finals: h – heat

== Short Course (25 m) ==
=== Men ===
Event	Time		Name	Club	Date	Meet	Location	Ref
50m freestyle	22.52	h	Adrián Vargas	Costa Rica	14 December 2024	World Championships	Budapest, Hungary	
50m freestyle	22.44	not ratified	Adrián Vargas	Piratas	11 October 2024	Puerto Rico International Open	San Juan, Puerto Rico	
100m freestyle	49.91	h	Adrián Vargas	Costa Rica	11 December 2024	World Championships	Budapest, Hungary	
100m freestyle	49.82	h, not ratified	Adrian Vargas	Piratas	10 October 2024	Puerto Rico International Open	San Juan, Puerto Rico	
200m freestyle	1:52.50	h	Mario Montoya	Costa Rica	9 April 2008	World Championships	Manchester, United Kingdom	
400m freestyle	3:55.71	h	Alberto Vega	Costa Rica	12 December 2024	World Championships	Budapest, Hungary	
800m freestyle	8:11.18		Alberto Vega	Costa Rica	14 December 2024	World Championships	Budapest, Hungary	
1500m freestyle	15:49.30		Alberto Vega	Costa Rica	31 October 2021	Puerto Rico International Open	San Juan, Puerto Rico	
50m backstroke	25.53		Julio Perez	Costa Rica	28 October 2021	Puerto Rico International Open	San Juan, Puerto Rico	
100m backstroke	54.53		Julio Perez	Costa Rica	31 October 2021	Puerto Rico International Open	San Juan, Puerto Rico	
200m backstroke	1:59.25		Julio Perez	Costa Rica	30 October 2021	Puerto Rico International Open	San Juan, Puerto Rico	
50m breaststroke	28.37	h	Arnoldo Herrera	Costa Rica	28 October 2021	Puerto Rico International Open	San Juan, Puerto Rico	
100m breaststroke	1:01.93		Arnoldo Herrera	Costa Rica	31 October 2021	Puerto Rico International Open	San Juan, Puerto Rico	
200m breaststroke	2:13.81	h	Arnoldo Herrera	Costa Rica	13 December 2018	World Championships	Hangzhou, China	
50m butterfly	24.20	h	Bryan Alvarez	Costa Rica	9 December 2016	World Championships	Windsor, Canada	
100m butterfly	54.77	h	Bryan Alvarez	Costa Rica	7 December 2016	World Championships	Windsor, Canada	
200m butterfly	2:01.57	h	Bryan Alvarez	Costa Rica	11 December 2018	World Championships	Hangzhou, China	
100m individual medley	57.44	h	Esteban Araya	Costa Rica	8 December 2016	World Championships	Windsor, Canada	
200m individual medley	2:04.91	h	Esteban Araya	Costa Rica	6 December 2016	World Championships	Windsor, Canada	
400m individual medley	4:25.00	h	Esteban Araya	Costa Rica	10 December 2016	World Championships	Windsor, Canada	
4 × 50 m freestyle relay								
4 × 100 m freestyle relay	3:32.66	h	Esteban Araya (53.31); Jose David Solis Rosales (55.26); Arnoldo Herrera (52.62); Juan Dobles (51.47)	Costa Rica	6 December 2016	World Championships	Windsor, Canada	
4 × 200 m freestyle relay	7:41.10	h	Antonio González (1:55.29); Bryan Alvaraz (1:55.90); Arnoldo Herrera (1:55.53); Esteban Araya (1:54.38)	Costa Rica	9 December 2016	World Championships	Windsor, Canada	
4 × 50 m medley relay								
4 × 100 m medley relay								

Legend: # – Record awaiting ratification by FECONA; WR – World record; AM – Americas record;
Records not set in finals: h – heat; sf – semifinal; r – relay 1st leg; rh – relay heat 1st leg; b – B final; † – en route to final mark; tt – time trial

=== Women ===
Event	Time		Name	Club	Date	Meet	Location	Ref
50 m freestyle	26.14		Claudia Poll	Costa Rica	13 January 1995			
100 m freestyle	54.56		Claudia Poll	Costa Rica	8 February 1997			
200 m freestyle	1:54.17		Claudia Poll	Costa Rica	17 April 1997			
400 m freestyle	4:00.03		Claudia Poll	Costa Rica	17 April 1997			
800 m freestyle	8:27.92		Claudia Poll	Costa Rica	8 February 1997			
1500 m freestyle								
50m backstroke	30.36		Helena Moreno	Costa Rica	5 August 2018	XI Torneo la Anexión		
100m backstroke	1:05.43	h	Mariangel Hidalgo	Costa Rica	12 December 2012	World Championships	Istanbul, Turkey	
200m backstroke	2:22.55		Susan Anchía	Costa Rica	23 September 2016	Open Piscina Corta Fecona 2016		
50m breaststroke	31.07		Sandra Arroyo	Costa Rica	18 April 1997			
100m breaststroke	1:12.93		Sandra Arroyo	Costa Rica	18 April 1997			
200m breaststroke	2:35.41		Sandra Arroyo	Costa Rica	18 April 1997			
50m butterfly	27.53		Marie Meza	Costa Rica	5 February 2016	Steirische Hallenmeisterschaften		
100m butterfly	1:00.66	h	Karina Solera	Costa Rica	13 December 2024	World Championships	Budapest, Hungary	
200m butterfly	2:14.39	h	Karina Solera	Costa Rica	12 December 2024	World Championships	Budapest, Hungary	
100m individual medley	1:03.51		Claudia Poll	Costa Rica	1 April 1999			
200m individual medley	2:15.55		Claudia Poll	Costa Rica	11 February 1995			
400m individual medley	5:01.36	h	Daniela Alfaro	Costa Rica	11 December 2018	World Championships	Hangzhou, China	
4 × 50 m freestyle relay								
4 × 100 m freestyle relay								
4 × 200 m freestyle relay								
4 × 50 m medley relay								
4 × 100 m medley relay								

Legend: # – Record awaiting ratification by FECONA; WR – World record; AM – Americas record;
Records not set in finals: h – heat; sf – semifinal; r – relay 1st leg; rh – relay heat 1st leg; b – B final; † – en route to final mark; tt – time trial

=== Mixed relay ===
Event	Time		Name	Club	Date	Meet	Location	Ref
4 × 50 m freestyle relay	1:43.45	h	Beatriz Padrón (26.52); Daniela Alfaro (28.21); Arnoldo Herrera (24.38); Bryan Alvaréz (24.34)	Costa Rica	12 December 2018	World Championships	Hangzhou, China	
4 × 50 m medley relay	1:50.03	h	Bryan Alvaréz (26.49); Arnoldo Herrera (28.40); Daniela Alfaro (29.01); Beatriz Padrón (26.13)	Costa Rica	13 December 2018	World Championships	Hangzhou, China	

Legend: # – Record awaiting ratification by FECONA;
Records not set in finals: h – heat
