= Swimming at the 1987 Pan American Games – Women's 100 metre freestyle =

Women's 100 metre freestyle at the 1987 Pan American Games
- Venue: Indiana University Natatorium
- Dates: August 9 (preliminaries and finals)
- Competitors: from - nations

Medalists
Gold medal	Silvia Poll	Costa Rica
Silver medal	Sara Linke	United States
Bronze medal	Jenny Thompson	United States

The women's 100 metre freestyle competition of the swimming events at the 1987 Pan American Games took place on 9 August at the Indiana University Natatorium. The last Pan American Games champion was Carrie Steinseifer of US.

This race consisted of two lengths of the pool, both lengths being in freestyle.

== Results ==
All times are in minutes and seconds.

KEY:	q	Fastest non-qualifiers	Q	Qualified	GR	Games record	NR	National record	PB	Personal best	SB	Seasonal best

=== Heats ===
The first round was held on August 9.

Rank	Name	Nationality	Time	Notes
1	Silvia Poll	Costa Rica	56.10	Q, NR, GR
-	-	-	-	Q
-	-	-	-	Q
-	-	-	-	Q
-	-	-	-	Q
-	-	-	-	Q
-	-	-	-	Q
-	-	-	-	Q

=== Final ===
The final was held on August 9.

Rank	Name	Nationality	Time	Notes
1st place, gold medalist(s)	Silvia Poll	Costa Rica	56.39	
2nd place, silver medalist(s)	Sara Linke	United States	57.30	
3rd place, bronze medalist(s)	Jenny Thompson	United States	57.46	
4	Cheryl McArton	Canada	58.56	
5	Sally Gilbert	Canada	58.65	
6	Karen Dieffenthaler	Trinidad and Tobago	58.74	
7	Patricia Kohlmann	Mexico	58.94	
8	Virginia Sachero	Argentina	1:00.88	
