= Swimming at the 1987 Pan American Games – Women's 200 metre individual medley =

Women's 200 metre individual medley at the 1987 Pan American Games
- Venue: Indiana University Natatorium
- Dates: August 14 (preliminaries and finals)
- Competitors: from - nations

Medalists
Gold medal	Susan Habermas	United States
Silver medal	Catherine Ritch	United States
Bronze medal	Karin Helmstaedt	Canada

The women's 200 metre individual medley competition of the swimming events at the 1987 Pan American Games took place on 14 August at the Indiana University Natatorium. The last Pan American Games champion was Tracy Caulkins of US.

This race consisted of four lengths of the pool, one each in backstroke, breaststroke, butterfly and freestyle swimming.

== Results ==
All times are in minutes and seconds.

KEY:	q	Fastest non-qualifiers	Q	Qualified	GR	Games record	NR	National record	PB	Personal best	SB	Seasonal best

=== Final ===
The final was held on August 14.

Rank	Name	Nationality	Time	Notes
1st place, gold medalist(s)	Susan Habermas	United States	2:18.22	
2nd place, silver medalist(s)	Catherine Ritch	United States	2:20.06	
3rd place, bronze medalist(s)	Karin Helmstaedt	Canada	2:21.59	
4	Cheryl McArton	Canada	2:23.14	
5	Valentina Aracil	Argentina	2:25.54	
6	Cláudia Sprengel	Brazil	2:26.92	
7	Patricia Kohlmann	Mexico	2:26.94	
8	Ana Rios	Puerto Rico	DQ	
