= Carolina Araujo =

Carolina Araujo may refer to:

- Carolina Araujo (swimmer) (born 1971), Mozambican swimmer
- Carolina Araujo (mathematician) (born 1976), Brazilian mathematician
