= Brian Alvarez =

Brian Alvarez may refer to:

- Brian Jordan Alvarez (born 1987), American actor and filmmaker
- Bryan Alvarez (born 1975), American wrestler, host, editor and publisher
- Bryan Alvaréz (born 1999), Costa Rican swimmer
