= 50 metres freestyle =

The 50 metres freestyle is an event in competitive swimming. World records are ratified by World Aquatics (formerly FINA). The current long course world record holders are Australia's Cameron McEvoy and the US' Kate Douglass, while the current short course world record holders are the Cayman Islands' Jordan Crooks and the US' Gretchen Walsh.

The event was first contested at the Olympic Games in 1988; the current Olympic champions are McEvoy, and Sweden's Sarah Sjöström. It was first contested at the World Aquatics Championships in 1986; the current world champions (long course) are McEvoy, and Australia's Meg Harris. It was first contested at the World Aquatics Swimming Championships (25m) in 1993; the current world champions (short course) are Crooks and Walsh

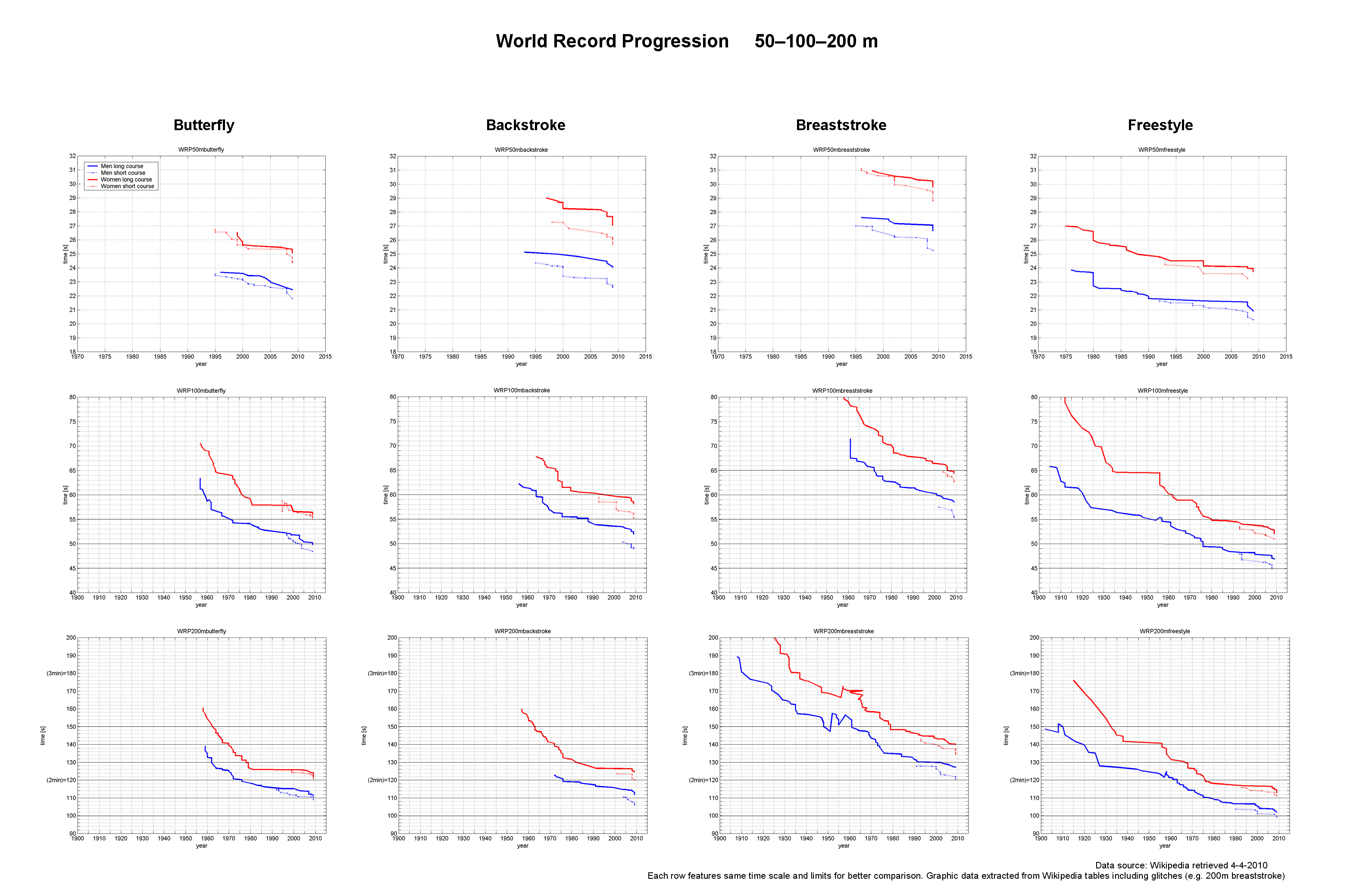
Graphic data for World Record Progression in Men and Women Swimming 50m-100m-200m Long and Short Course Butterfly-Backstroke-Breaststroke-Freestyle

== World record progression ==
=== Men long course ===
#	Time		Name	Nationality	Date	Meet	Location	Ref
1	23.86	†	Jonty Skinner	South Africa	14 August 1976	US National Championships	Philadelphia, United States	
2	23.74		Joe Bottom	United States	3 July 1977	Canada Cup	Etobicoke, Canada	
3	23.72		Ron Manganiello	United States	29 July 1978	-	Miami, United States	
4	23.70		Klaus Steinbach	West Germany	23 July 1979	-	Freiburg, West Germany	
5	23.66		Chris Cavanaugh	United States	2 February 1980	International Invitational	Amersfoort, Netherlands	
6	23.12	h	Chris Cavanaugh	United States	10 April 1980	US Spring National Championships	Austin, United States	
7	22.96	h	Rowdy Gaines	United States	10 April 1980	US Spring National Championships	Austin, United States	
8	22.83	h	Bruce Stahl	United States	10 April 1980	US Spring National Championships	Austin, United States	
8	22.83	=, h	Joe Bottom	United States	15 August 1980	Hawaiian Invitational	Honolulu, United States	
10	22.71		Joe Bottom	United States	15 August 1980	Hawaiian Invitational	Honolulu, United States	
11	22.54	h	Robin Leamy	United States	15 August 1981	US National Championships	Brown Deer, United States	
12	22.52		Dano Halsall	Switzerland	21 July 1985	Swiss Championships	Bellinzona, Switzerland	
13	22.40		Tom Jager	United States	6 December 1985	USS Invitational	Austin, United States	
14	22.33		Matt Biondi	United States	26 June 1986	USA World Championship Trials	Orlando, United States	
14	22.33	=	Matt Biondi	United States	30 July 1987	US National Championships	Clovis, United States	
16	22.32		Tom Jager	United States	13 August 1987	Pan Pacific Championships	Brisbane, Australia	
17	22.23		Tom Jager	United States	25 March 1988	US Spring National Championships	Orlando, United States	
-	22.18	^{[A]}	Peter Williams	South Africa	10 April 1988	CSCA Invitational	Indianapolis, United States	
18	22.14		Matt Biondi	United States	24 September 1988	Olympic Games	Seoul, South Korea	
19	22.12		Tom Jager	United States	20 August 1989	Pan Pacific Championships	Tokyo, Japan	
20	21.98	sf	Tom Jager	United States	24 March 1990	US Sprint Championships	Nashville, United States	
21	21.81		Tom Jager	United States	24 March 1990	US Sprint Championships	Nashville, United States	
22	21.64	tt	Alexander Popov	Russia	16 June 2000	Russian Championships	Moscow, Russia	
23	21.56		Eamon Sullivan	Australia	17 February 2008	NSW Championships	Sydney, Australia	
24	21.50	sf	Alain Bernard	France	23 March 2008	European Championships	Eindhoven, Netherlands	
25	21.41	sf	Eamon Sullivan	Australia	27 March 2008	Australian Championships	Sydney, Australia	
26	21.28		Eamon Sullivan	Australia	28 March 2008	Australian Championships	Sydney, Australia	
27	20.94		Frédérick Bousquet	France	26 April 2009	French Championships	Montpellier, France	
28	20.91		César Cielo	Brazil	18 December 2009	Brazilian Championships	São Paulo, Brazil	
29	20.88		Cameron McEvoy	Australia	20 March 2026	China Open	Shenzhen, China	

Legend: # – Record awaiting ratification by World Aquatics; e – equalled existing record;
Records not set in finals: h – heat; sf – semifinal; r – relay 1st leg; rh – relay heat 1st leg; b – B final; † – en route to final mark; so – swim-off; tt – time trial
1. Peter Williams' time of 22.18 was not ratified as a world record, as South Africa was banned from international competition during this period.

See note for all the performance-enhanced records, not recognized or sanctioned by World Aquatics. (Note: On February 25, 2025, after a well-publicized regimen of banned performance enhancing drugs,Kristian Gkolomeev swam the 50m freestyle at an Enhanced Games test event in 20.89 seconds, wearing the banned full-body non-textile swim suit.; On May 25, 2026, Kristian Gkolomeev swam the 50m freestyle at the 2026 Enhanced Games in 20.81 seconds, wearing the banned full-body non-textile suit.)

=== Men short course ===
#	Time		Name	Nationality	Date	Meet	Location	Ref
1	21.76		Nils Rudolph	East Germany	10 February 1990	FINA World Cup	Bonn, West Germany	
2	21.64		Steve Crocker	United States	21 March 1992	-	Dallas, United States	
3	21.60		Mark Foster	Great Britain	17 February 1993	World Cup	Sheffield, United Kingdom	
4	21.50		Alexander Popov	Russia	13 March 1994	World Cup	Desenzano del Garda, Italy	
5	21.48	h	Mark Foster	Great Britain	13 December 1998	European Championships	Sheffield, United Kingdom	
6	21.31		Mark Foster	Great Britain	13 December 1998	European Championships	Sheffield, United Kingdom	
6	21.31	h	Roland Schoeman	South Africa	23 March 2000	NCAA Men's Division I Championships	Minneapolis, United States	
7	21.21		Anthony Ervin	United States	23 March 2000	NCAA Men's Division I Championships	Minneapolis, United States	
8	21.13		Mark Foster	Great Britain	28 January 2001	World Cup	Paris, France	
9	21.10		Frédérick Bousquet	France	25 Mar 2004	NCAA Men's Division I Championships	East Meadow, United States	
10	20.98	h	Roland Schoeman	South Africa	12 Aug 2006	Invitational	Hamburg, Germany	
11	20.93		Stefan Nystrand	Sweden	18 November 2007	World Cup	Berlin, Germany	
12	20.81		Duje Draganja	Croatia	11 April 2008	World Championships	Manchester, United Kingdom	
13	20.64		Roland Schoeman	South Africa	7 September 2008	South African Championships	Germiston, South Africa	
14	20.48	sf	Amaury Leveaux	France	11 December 2008	European Championships	Rijeka, Croatia	
15	20.30	sf	Roland Schoeman	South Africa	8 August 2009	South African Championships	Pietermaritzburg, South Africa	
16	20.26		Florent Manaudou	France	5 December 2014	World Championships	Doha, Qatar	
17	20.24		Caeleb Dressel	United States	20 December 2019	International Swimming League	Las Vegas, United States	
18	20.16		Caeleb Dressel	United States	21 November 2020	International Swimming League	Budapest, Hungary	
19	20.08	h	Jordan Crooks	Cayman Islands	14 December 2024	World Championships	Budapest, Hungary	
20	19.90	sf	Jordan Crooks	Cayman Islands	14 December 2024	World Championships	Budapest, Hungary	

Legend: # – Record awaiting ratification by World Aquatics; e – equalled existing record;
Records not set in finals: h – heat; sf – semifinal; r – relay 1st leg; rh – relay heat 1st leg; b – B final; † – en route to final mark; so – swim-off; tt – time trial

=== Women long course ===
#	Time		Name	Nationality	Date	Meet	Location	Ref
1	26.99	r, †	Kornelia Ender	East Germany	26 July 1975	World Championships	Cali, Colombia	
2	26.95		Johanna Malloy	Canada	16 August 1977	Canadian Summer Games	St. John's, NL, Canada	
3	26.74		Anne Jardin	Canada	19 August 1978	Canadian Championships	Etobicoke, Canada	
4	26.61	h	Cynthia Woodhead	United States	10 April 1980	US Spring National Championships	Austin, United States	
5	26.53	h	Kelly Asplund	United States	10 April 1980	US Spring National Championships	Austin, United States	
6	26.32	h	Jill Sterkel	United States	10 April 1980	US Spring National Championships	Austin, United States	
7	25.96		Jill Sterkel	United States	10 April 1980	US Spring National Championships	Austin, United States	
8	25.79	tt	Jill Sterkel	United States	3 April 1981	Longhorn Invitational	Austin, United States	
9	25.69	h	Dara Torres	United States	29 January 1983	Speedo International	Amersfoort, Netherlands	
10	25.64		Annemarie Verstappen	Netherlands	9 July 1983	Dutch Championships	Amersfoort, Netherlands	
11	25.62		Dara Torres	United States	5 August 1983	US National Championships	Clovis, United States	
12	25.61	r	Dara Torres	United States	21 July 1984	Pre-Olympic meet	Mission Viejo, United States	
13	25.50	h	Tamara Costache	Romania	16 July 1986	Romanian Championships	Bucharest, Romania	
14	25.34		Tamara Costache	Romania	16 July 1986	Romanian Championships	Bucharest, Romania	
15	25.31		Tamara Costache	Romania	1 August 1986	Balkan Games	Sofia, Bulgaria	
16	25.28		Tamara Costache	Romania	23 August 1986	World Championships	Madrid, Spain	
17	24.98		Yang Wenyi	China	11 April 1988	Asian Championships	Guangzhou, China	
18	24.79		Yang Wenyi	China	31 July 1992	Olympic Games	Barcelona, Spain	
19	24.51		Le Jingyi	China	11 September 1994	World Championships	Rome, Italy	
19	24.51	=, h	Inge de Bruijn	Netherlands	26 May 2000	Super Speedo Grand Prix	Sheffield, United Kingdom	
21	24.48		Inge de Bruijn	Netherlands	4 June 2000	Dutch Championships	Drachten, Netherlands	
22	24.39		Inge de Bruijn	Netherlands	10 June 2000	Trofeu Jose Finkel	Rio de Janeiro, Brazil	
23	24.13	sf	Inge de Bruijn	Netherlands	22 September 2000	Olympic Games	Sydney, Australia	
24	24.09		Marleen Veldhuis	Netherlands	24 March 2008	European Championships	Eindhoven, Netherlands	
25	23.97		Libby Trickett	Australia	29 March 2008	Australian Championships	Sydney, Australia	
26	23.96		Marleen Veldhuis	Netherlands	19 April 2009	Amsterdam Swim Cup	Amsterdam, Netherlands	
27	23.73		Britta Steffen	Germany	2 August 2009	World Championships	Rome, Italy	
28	23.67	sf	Sarah Sjöström	Sweden	29 July 2017	World Championships	Budapest, Hungary	
29	23.61	sf	Sarah Sjöström	Sweden	29 July 2023	World Championships	Fukuoka, Japan	
30	23.59		Kate Douglass	United States	19 June 2026	Pro Swim Series	Indianapolis, United States	
31	23.55		Gretchen Walsh	United States	28 June 2026	Sette Colli Trophy	Rome, Italy	
32	23.49	h	Kate Douglass	United States	15 August 2026	Pan Pacific Championships	Irvine, United States	
32	23.19		Kate Douglass	United States	15 August 2026	Pan Pacific Championships	Irvine, United States	

Legend: # – Record awaiting ratification by World Aquatics; e – equalled existing record;
Records not set in finals: h – heat; sf – semifinal; r – relay 1st leg; rh – relay heat 1st leg; b – B final; † – en route to final mark; so – swim-off; tt – time trial

=== Women short course ===
#	Time		Name	Nationality	Date	Meet	Location	Ref
1	24.75		Franziska van Almsick	Germany	4 November 1992	-	Schwäbisch Gmünd, Germany	
2	24.62	h	Le Jingyi	China	3 December 1993	World Championships	Palma de Mallorca, Spain	
3	24.23		Le Jingyi	China	3 December 1993	World Championships	Palma de Mallorca, Spain	
4	24.09		Therese Alshammar	Sweden	11 December 1999	European Championships	Lisbon, Portugal	
5	23.59		Therese Alshammar	Sweden	18 March 2000	World Championships	Athens, Greece	
6	23.58		Marleen Veldhuis	Netherlands	17 November 2007	World Cup	Berlin, Germany	
7	23.25		Marleen Veldhuis	Netherlands	13 April 2008	World Championships	Manchester, United Kingdom	
8	23.24		Ranomi Kromowidjojo	Netherlands	7 August 2013	World Cup	Eindhoven, Netherlands	
8	23.24	=	Ranomi Kromowidjojo	Netherlands	12 December 2015	Duel in the Pool	Indianapolis, United States	
10	23.10		Sarah Sjöström	Sweden	2 August 2017	World Cup	Moscow, Russia	
11	22.93		Ranomi Kromowidjojo	Netherlands	7 August 2017	World Cup	Berlin, Germany	
12	22.87	sf	Gretchen Walsh	United States	14 December 2024	World Championships	Budapest, Hungary	
13	22.83		Gretchen Walsh	United States	15 December 2024	World Championships	Budapest, Hungary	
14	22.75	#	Gretchen Walsh	United States	16 October 2026	UVA Pro Elite SCM Worlds Prep Meet	Charlottesville, United States	
14	22.75	#	Kate Douglass	United States	29 October 2026	US Short Course World Championship Trials	Westmont, United States	

Legend: # – Record awaiting ratification by World Aquatics; e – equalled existing record;
Records not set in finals: h – heat; sf – semifinal; r – relay 1st leg; rh – relay heat 1st leg; b – B final; † – en route to final mark; so – swim-off; tt – time trial

== All-time top 25 ==
Tables show data for two definitions of "Top 25" - the top 25 50 m freestyle times and the top 25 athletes:
- denotes top performance for athletes in the top 25 50 m freestyle times
- denotes lesser performances, still in the top 25 50 m freestyle times, by repeat athletes
- denotes top performance (only) for other top 25 athletes who fall outside the top 25 50 m freestyle times

=== Men long course ===
- Correct as of August 2026

Ath.#	Perf.#	Time	Athlete	Nation	Date	Place	Ref.
1	1	20.88	Cameron McEvoy	Australia	20 March 2026	Shenzhen	
2	2	20.91	César Cielo	Brazil	18 December 2009	São Paulo	
3	3	20.94	Frédérick Bousquet	France	26 April 2009	Montpellier	
	4	20.97	McEvoy #2		26 July 2026	Glasgow	
	5	21.02	Cielo #2		17 December 2009	São Paulo	
4	6	21.04	Caeleb Dressel	United States	27 July 2019	Gwangju	
4	6	21.04	Caeleb Dressel	United States	20 June 2021	Omaha	
	8	21.06	McEvoy #3		29 July 2023	Fukuoka	
5	8	21.06	Egor Kornev	Russia	9 June 2026	Kazan	
	10	21.07	Dressel #3		1 August 2021	Tokyo	
	11	21.08	Cielo #3		1 August 2009	Rome	
6	12	21.11	Ben Proud	Great Britain	8 August 2018	Glasgow	
	13	21.12	Kornev #2		8 June 2026	Kazan	
	14	21.13	McEvoy #4		16 February 2024	Doha	
7	14	21.13	Nikita Sheremet	Ukraine	16 August 2026	Paris	
	16	21.14	Cielo #4		9 July 2009	Indianapolis	
	16	21.14	McEvoy #5		2 August 2025	Singapore	
	18	21.15	Dressel #4		29 July 2017	Budapest	
	19	21.16	Proud #2		29 June 2018	Rome	
	20	21.17	Bousquet #2		28 June 2009	Pescara	
	21	21.18	Dressel #5		26 July 2019	Gwangju	
8	22	21.19	Ashley Callus	Australia	26 November 2009	Canberra	
8	22	21.19	Florent Manaudou	France	8 August 2015	Kazan	
10	24	21.20	George Bovell	Trinidad and Tobago	31 July 2009	Rome	
	25	21.21	Bousquet #3		31 July 2009	Rome	
	25	21.21	Bousquet #4		1 August 2009	Rome	
11		21.23	Alain Bernard	France	26 April 2009	Montpellier	
12		21.25	Amaury Leveaux	France	1 August 2009	Rome	
13		21.27	Bruno Fratus	Brazil	29 July 2017	Budapest	
13		21.27	Vladimir Morozov	Russia	15 August 2019	Singapore	
15		21.28	Eamon Sullivan	Australia	28 March 2008	Sydney	
16		21.29	Duje Draganja	Croatia	31 July 2009	Rome	
17		21.32	Jack Alexy	United States	1 August 2025	Singapore	
18		21.35	Jamie Jack	Australia	15 August 2026	Irvine	
19		21.37	Nathan Adrian	United States	7 August 2015	Kazan	
19		21.37	Andrea Vergani	Italy	8 August 2018	Glasgow	
19		21.37	Andrej Barna	Serbia	16 August 2026	Paris	
22		21.38	Vladyslav Bukhov	Ukraine	16 February 2024	Doha	
23		21.40	Cullen Jones	United States	31 July 2009	Rome	
23		21.40	Anthony Ervin	United States	12 August 2016	Rio de Janeiro	
25		21.41	Michael Andrew	United States	24 June 2022	Budapest	

=== Men short course ===
- Correct as of October 2026

Ath.#	Perf.#	Time	Athlete	Nation	Date	Place	Ref.
1	1	19.90	Jordan Crooks	Cayman Islands	14 December 2024	Budapest	
	2	20.08	Crooks #2		14 December 2024	Budapest	
2	3	20.13	Cameron McEvoy	Australia	8 October 2026	Tashkent	
3	4	20.16	Caeleb Dressel	United States	21 November 2020	Budapest	
4	5	20.18	Ben Proud	Great Britain	7 December 2023	Otopeni	
	6	20.19	Crooks #3		15 December 2024	Budapest	
	6	20.19	McEvoy #2		16 October 2026	Astana	
	8	20.22	McEvoy #3		1 October 2026	Baku	
	9	20.24	Dressel #2		20 December 2019	Las Vegas	
5	10	20.26	Florent Manaudou	France	5 December 2014	Doha	
5	10	20.26	Egor Kornev	Russia	1 October 2026	Baku	
	12	20.28	Dressel #3		15 November 2020	Budapest	
7	13	20.30	Roland Schoeman	South Africa	8 August 2009	Pietermaritzburg	
8	14	20.31	Vladimir Morozov	Russia	15 December 2017	Copenhagen	
	14	20.31	Crooks #4		16 December 2022	Melbourne	
8	14	20.31	Joshua Liendo	Canada	23 October 2025	Toronto	
	17	20.33	Morozov #2		14 December 2018	Hangzhou	
	18	20.36	Crooks #5		16 December 2022	Melbourne	
	19	20.39	Morozov #3		14 December 2018	Hangzhou	
	19	20.39	Kornev #2		20 December 2025	Saint Petersburg	
	21	20.40	Morozov #4		6 December 2019	Glasgow	
	21	20.40	Proud #2		3 December 2021	Eindhoven	
	23	20.43	Dressel #4		14 December 2018	Hangzhou	
	24	20.45	Morozov #5		15 December 2017	Copenhagen	
	24	20.45	Proud #3		19 December 2021	Abu Dhabi	
10		20.48	Amaury Leveaux	France	11 December 2008	Rijeka	
11		20.51	César Cielo	Brazil	17 December 2010	Dubai	
11		20.51	Jack Alexy	United States	14 December 2024	Budapest	
13		20.53	Frédérick Bousquet	France	10 December 2009	Istanbul	
14		20.54	Guilherme Caribé	Brazil	4 September 2026	São Paulo	
15		20.63	Nyls Korstanje	Netherlands	14 December 2024	Budapest	
16		20.64	Alain Bernard	France	14 December 2008	Rijeka	
17		20.66	Chris Guiliano	United States	29 October 2026	Westmont	
18		20.68	Maxim Lobanovszkij	Hungary	14 December 2019	Kaposvár	
18		20.68	Kyle Chalmers	Australia	28 October 2021	Kazan	
18		20.68	Isaac Cooper	Australia	2 October 2026	Sydney	
21		20.69	Marco Orsi	Italy	5 December 2014	Doha	
21		20.69	Ilya Kharun	United States	29 October 2026	Westmont	
23		20.70	Stefan Nystrand	Sweden	15 November 2009	Berlin	
23		20.70	Duje Draganja	Croatia	10 December 2009	Istanbul	
23		20.70	Evgeny Sedov	Russia	6 December 2014	Doha	
23		20.70	Ryan Held	United States	19 December 2021	Abu Dhabi	
23		20.70	Dylan Carter	Trinidad and Tobago	16 December 2022	Melbourne	
23		20.70	Jere Hribar	Croatia	2 December 2025	Lublin	
23		20.70	Jere Hribar	Croatia	7 December 2025	Lublin	

=== Women long course ===
- Correct as of September 2026

Ath.#	Perf.#	Time	Athlete	Nation	Date	Place	Ref.
1	1	23.19	Kate Douglass	United States	15 August 2026	Irvine	
	2	23.49	Douglass #2		15 August 2026	Irvine	
2	3	23.55	Gretchen Walsh	United States	27 June 2026	Rome	
	4	23.59	Douglass #3		19 June 2026	Indianapolis	
	5	23.60	Walsh #2		1 August 2026	Irvine	
3	6	23.61	Sarah Sjöström	Sweden	29 July 2023	Fukuoka	
	7	23.62	Sjöström #2		30 July 2023	Fukuoka	
	8	23.66	Sjöström #3		3 August 2024	Paris	
	9	23.67	Sjöström #4		29 July 2017	Budapest	
	10	23.69	Sjöström #5		30 July 2017	Budapest	
	10	23.69	Sjöström #6		18 February 2024	Doha	
	12	23.71	Sjöström #7		4 August 2024	Paris	
4	13	23.73	Britta Steffen	Germany	2 August 2009	Rome	
	14	23.74	Sjöström #8		4 August 2018	Glasgow	
	14	23.74	Walsh #3		15 August 2026	Irvine	
5	16	23.75	Pernille Blume	Denmark	4 August 2018	Glasgow	
	16	23.75	Sjöström #9		23 June 2024	Rome	
6	18	23.78	Cate Campbell	Australia	7 April 2018	Gold Coast	
	18	23.78	Sjöström #10		30 June 2019	Malmö	
	18	23.78	Walsh #4		19 June 2026	Indianapolis	
	18	23.78	Walsh #5		15 August 2026	Irvine	
	22	23.79	Campbell #2		3 March 2018	Gold Coast	
	23	23.81	Campbell #3		12 August 2018	Tokyo	
7	23	23.81	Emma McKeon	Australia	1 August 2021	Tokyo	
	25	23.82	Sjöström #11		21 May 2023	Monaco	
8		23.84	Katarzyna Wasick	Poland	15 August 2026	Paris	
9		23.85	Ranomi Kromowidjojo	Netherlands	30 July 2017	Budapest	
10		23.88	Therese Alshammar	Sweden	2 August 2009	Rome	
11		23.89	Meg Harris	Australia	15 August 2026	Irvine	
12		23.96	Marleen Veldhuis	Netherlands	16 April 2009	Amsterdam	
12		23.96	Fran Halsall	Great Britain	24 July 2014	Glasgow	
14		23.97	Libby Trickett	Australia	22 March 2008	Sydney	
14		23.97	Simone Manuel	United States	30 July 2017	Budapest	
14		23.97	Liu Xiang	China	26 September 2021	Xi'an	
17		23.98	Torri Huske	United States	7 June 2025	Indianapolis	
17		23.98	Wu Qingfeng	China	24 September 2026	Tokyo	
19		23.99	Shayna Jack	Australia	15 June 2024	Brisbane	
19		23.99	Sara Curtis	Italy	15 August 2026	Paris	
21		24.00	Abbey Weitzeil	United States	1 July 2023	Indianapolis	
22		24.05	Anna Moesch	United States	1 August 2026	Irvine	
23		24.07	Dara Torres	United States	17 August 2008	Beijing	
24		24.09	Marrit Steenbergen	Netherlands	5 July 2026	Eindhoven	
24		24.09	Milou van Wijk	Netherlands	15 August 2026	Paris	

=== Women short course ===
- Correct as of October 2026

Ath.#	Perf.#	Time	Athlete	Nation	Date	Place	Ref.
1	1	22.75	Gretchen Walsh	United States	16 October 2026	Charlottesville	
1	1	22.75	Kate Douglass	United States	29 October 2026	Westmont	
	3	22.83	Walsh #2		15 December 2024	Budapest	
	4	22.87	Walsh #3		14 December 2024	Budapest	
	4	22.87	Douglass #2		29 October 2026	Westmont	
3	6	22.93	Ranomi Kromowidjojo	Netherlands	7 August 2017	Berlin	
	7	22.94	Douglass #3		16 October 2026	Charlottesville	
	8	22.99	Walsh #4		29 October 2026	Westmont	
4	9	23.00	Sarah Sjöström	Sweden	7 August 2017	Berlin	
	10	23.02	Walsh #5		14 December 2024	Budapest	
5	11	23.04	Emma McKeon	Australia	17 December 2022	Melbourne	
	12	23.05	Kromowidjojo #2		12 December 2020	Eindhoven	
	12	23.05	Douglass #4		15 December 2024	Budapest	
	14	23.08	Sjöström #2		18 November 2021	Eindhoven	
	14	23.08	Sjöström #3		21 December 2021	Abu Dhabi	
	16	23.10	Sjöström #4		2 August 2017	Moscow	
6	16	23.10	Katarzyna Wasick	Poland	3 November 2022	Indianapolis	
	16	23.10	Walsh #6		18 October 2024	Charlottesville	
	19	23.12	Sjöström #5		2 September 2021	Naples	
	19	23.12	Sjöström #6		3 November 2021	Kazan	
	21	23.17	Sjöström #7		25 November 2021	Eindhoven	
7	22	23.19	Cate Campbell	Australia	27 October 2017	Adelaide	
	22	23.19	Kromowidjojo #3		16 December 2018	Hangzhou	
	24	23.20	Douglass #5		14 December 2024	Budapest	
	24	23.20	Wasick #2		7 December 2025	Lublin	
	24	23.20	Walsh #7		29 October 2026	Westmont	
8		23.25	Marleen Veldhuis	Netherlands	13 April 2008	Manchester	
9		23.26	Camille Spink	United States	29 October 2026	Westmont	
10		23.27	Therese Alshammar	Sweden	21 November 2009	Singapore	
11		23.32	Hinkelien Schreuder	Netherlands	13 December 2009	Istanbul	
12		23.34	Maria Kameneva	Russia	16 December 2022	Saint Petersburg	
13		23.39	Silvia Di Pietro	Italy	2 December 2025	Lublin	
14		23.41	Sara Curtis	Italy	7 December 2025	Lublin	
14		23.41	Béryl Gastaldello	France	7 December 2025	Lublin	
14		23.41	Marrit Steenbergen	Netherlands	16 October 2026	Astana	
17		23.42	Liberty Clark	United States	29 October 2026	Westmont	
18		23.44	Fran Halsall	Great Britain	19 December 2009	Manchester	
18		23.44	Abbey Weitzeil	United States	18 September 2021	Naples	
20		23.45	Alexandria Perkins	Australia	17 October 2025	Westmont	
20		23.45	Alexandria Perkins	Australia	2 October 2026	Sydney	
21		23.48	Siobhán Haughey	Hong Kong	1 October 2026	Baku	
22		23.49	Jeanette Ottesen	Denmark	12 December 2015	Indianapolis	
22		23.49	Pernille Blume	Denmark	17 December 2017	Copenhagen	
22		23.49	Taylor Ruck	Canada	23 October 2025	Toronto	
25		23.52	Michelle Coleman	Sweden	6 December 2023	Otopeni	

== Olympic champions ==
=== Men ===
Edition	Winner	Time	Notes	Ref.
(South Korea) Seoul 1988	Matt Biondi (USA)	22.14	WR	
(Spain) Barcelona 1992	Alexander Popov (EUN)	21.91	OR	
(United States) Atlanta 1996	Alexander Popov (RUS)	22.13		
(Australia) Sydney 2000	Gary Hall, Jr. (USA)	21.98		
(Australia) Sydney 2000	Anthony Ervin (USA)	21.98		
(Greece) Athens 2004	Gary Hall, Jr. (USA)	21.93		
(China) Beijing 2008	César Cielo (BRA)	21.30	OR	
(United Kingdom) London 2012	Florent Manaudou (FRA)	21.34		
(Brazil) Rio de Janeiro 2016	Anthony Ervin (USA)	21.40		
(Japan) Tokyo 2020	Caeleb Dressel (USA)	21.07	OR	
(France) Paris 2024	Cameron McEvoy (AUS)	21.25		

=== Women ===
Edition	Winner	Time	Notes	Ref.
(South Korea) Seoul 1988	Kristin Otto (GDR)	25.49	OR	
(Spain) Barcelona 1992	Yang Wenyi (CHN)	24.79	WR	
(United States) Atlanta 1996	Amy Van Dyken (USA)	24.87		
(Australia) Sydney 2000	Inge de Bruijn (NED)	24.32	(Note: Inge de Bruijn set a world record of 24.13 in the semifinals.)	
(Greece) Athens 2004	Inge de Bruijn (NED)	24.58		
(China) Beijing 2008	Britta Steffen (GER)	24.06	OR	
(United Kingdom) London 2012	Ranomi Kromowidjojo (NED)	24.05	OR	
(Brazil) Rio de Janeiro 2016	Pernille Blume (DEN)	24.07		
(Japan) Tokyo 2020	Emma McKeon (AUS)	23.81	OR	
(France) Paris 2024	Sarah Sjöström (SWE)	23.71	(Note: Sarah Sjöström set an Olympic record of 23.66 in the semifinals.)	

== World champions (long course) ==
=== Men ===
Edition	Winner	Time	Notes	Ref.
(Spain) Madrid 1986	Tom Jager (USA)	22.49	CR	
(Australia) Perth 1991	Tom Jager (USA)	22.16	CR	
(Italy) Rome 1994	Alexander Popov (RUS)	22.17		
(Australia) Perth 1998	Bill Pilczuk (USA)	22.29		
(Japan) Fukuoka 2001	Anthony Ervin (USA)	22.09	(Note: Anthony Ervin set a championship record of 22.05 in the semifinals.)	
(Spain) Barcelona 2003	Alexander Popov (RUS)	21.92	CR	
(Canada) Montreal 2005	Roland Schoeman (RSA)	21.69	CR	
(Australia) Melbourne 2007	Ben Wildman-Tobriner (USA)	21.88		
(Italy) Rome 2009	César Cielo (BRA)	21.08	CR	
(China) Shanghai 2011	César Cielo (BRA)	21.52		
(Spain) Barcelona 2013	César Cielo (BRA)	21.32		
(Russia) Kazan 2015	Florent Manaudou (FRA)	21.19		
(Hungary) Budapest 2017	Caeleb Dressel (USA)	21.15		
(South Korea) Gwangju 2019	Caeleb Dressel (USA)	21.04	CR	
(Hungary) Budapest 2022	Ben Proud (GBR)	21.32		
(Japan) Fukuoka 2023	Cameron McEvoy (AUS)	21.06		
(Qatar) Doha 2024	Vladyslav Bukhov (UKR)	21.44		
Singapore 2025	Cameron McEvoy (AUS)	21.14		

=== Women ===
Edition	Winner	Time	Notes	Ref.
(Spain) Madrid 1986	Tamara Costache (ROU)	25.28	WR	
(Australia) Perth 1991	Zhuang Yong (CHN)	25.47		
(Italy) Rome 1994	Le Jingyi (CHN)	24.51	WR	
(Australia) Perth 1998	Amy Van Dyken (USA)	25.15		
(Japan) Fukuoka 2001	Inge de Bruijn (NED)	24.47	(Note: Inge de Bruijn set a championship record of 24.45 in the semifinals.)	
(Spain) Barcelona 2003	Inge de Bruijn (NED)	24.47		
(Canada) Montreal 2005	Libby Lenton (AUS)	24.59		
(Australia) Melbourne 2007	Libby Lenton (AUS)	24.53		
(Italy) Rome 2009	Britta Steffen (GER)	23.73	WR	
(China) Shanghai 2011	Therese Alshammar (SWE)	24.14		
(Spain) Barcelona 2013	Ranomi Kromowidjojo (NED)	24.05		
(Russia) Kazan 2015	Bronte Campbell (AUS)	24.12		
(Hungary) Budapest 2017	Sarah Sjöström (SWE)	23.69	(Note: Sarah Sjöström set a world record of 23.67 in the semifinals.)	
(South Korea) Gwangju 2019	Simone Manuel (USA)	24.05		
(Hungary) Budapest 2022	Sarah Sjöström (SWE)	23.98		
(Japan) Fukuoka 2023	Sarah Sjöström (SWE)	23.62	(Note: Sarah Sjöström set a world record of 23.61 in the semifinals.)	
(Qatar) Doha 2024	Sarah Sjöström (SWE)	23.69		
Singapore 2025	Meg Harris (AUS)	24.02		

== World champions (short course) ==
=== Men ===
Edition	Winner	Time	Notes	Ref.
(Spain) Palma de Mallorca 1993	Mark Foster (GBR)	21.84	CR	
(Brazil) Rio de Janeiro 1995	Francisco Sánchez (VEN)	21.80	CR	
(Sweden) Gothenburg 1997	Francisco Sánchez (VEN)	21.80		
Hong Kong 1999	Mark Foster (GBR)	21.81	(Note: Mark Veens set a championship record of 21.71 in the semifinals.)	
(Greece) Athens 2000	Mark Foster (GBR)	21.58	(Note: Mark Foster set a championship record of 21.43 in the semifinals.)	
(Russia) Moscow 2002	José Meolans (ARG)	21.36	CR	
(United States) Indianapolis 2004	Mark Foster (GBR)	21.58		
(China) Shanghai 2006	Duje Draganja (CRO)	21.38	(Note: Cullen Jones set a championship record of 21.31 in the semifinals.)	
(United Kingdom) Manchester 2008	Duje Draganja (CRO)	20.81	WR	
(United Arab Emirates) Dubai 2010	César Cielo (BRA)	20.51	CR	
(Turkey) Istanbul 2012	Vladimir Morozov (RUS)	20.55		
(Qatar) Doha 2014	Florent Manaudou (FRA)	20.26	WR	
(Canada) Windsor 2016	Jesse Puts (NED)	21.10		
(China) Hangzhou 2018	Vladimir Morozov (RUS)	20.33		
(United Arab Emirates) Abu Dhabi 2021	Ben Proud (GBR)	20.45		
(Australia) Melbourne 2022	Jordan Crooks (CAY)	20.46		
(Hungary) Budapest 2024	Jordan Crooks (CAY)	20.19	(Note: Jordan Crooks set a world record of 19.90 in the semifinals.)	

=== Women ===
Edition	Winner	Time	Notes	Ref.
(Spain) Palma de Mallorca 1993	Le Jingyi (CHN)	24.23	WR	
(Brazil) Rio de Janeiro 1995	Le Jingyi (CHN)	24.62		
(Sweden) Gothenburg 1997	Sandra Völker (GER)	24.70		
Hong Kong 1999	Inge de Bruijn (NED)	24.35		
(Greece) Athens 2000	Therese Alshammar (SWE)	23.59	WR	
(Russia) Moscow 2002	Therese Alshammar (SWE)	24.16		
(United States) Indianapolis 2004	Marleen Veldhuis (NED)	24.41		
(China) Shanghai 2006	Libby Lenton (AUS)	23.97		
(United Kingdom) Manchester 2008	Marleen Veldhuis (NED)	23.25	WR	
(United Arab Emirates) Dubai 2010	Ranomi Kromowidjojo (NED)	23.37		
(Turkey) Istanbul 2012	Aliaksandra Herasimenia (BLR)	23.64		
(Qatar) Doha 2014	Ranomi Kromowidjojo (NED)	23.32		
(Canada) Windsor 2016	Ranomi Kromowidjojo (NED)	23.60		
(China) Hangzhou 2018	Ranomi Kromowidjojo (NED)	23.19	CR	
(United Arab Emirates) Abu Dhabi 2021	Sarah Sjöström (SWE)	23.08	CR	
(Australia) Melbourne 2022	Emma McKeon (AUS)	23.04	CR	
(Hungary) Budapest 2024	Gretchen Walsh (USA)	22.83	WR	
