= Van der Plaats =

van der Plaats or Vander Plaats is a Dutch surname. Notable people with the surname include:

- Diana van der Plaats (born 1971), Dutch swimmer
- Bob Vander Plaats (born 1963), American politician
