= Swimming at the 1987 Pan American Games – Women's 4 × 200 metre freestyle relay =

Women's 4 × 200 metre freestyle relay at the 1987 Pan American Games
- Venue: Indiana University Natatorium
- Dates: August 9 (preliminaries and finals)
- Competitors: from - nations

Medalists
Gold medal	Susan Habermas, Sara Linke, Pam Hayden and Whitney Hedgepeth	United States
Silver medal	-, -, - and -	Canada
Bronze medal	-, -, - and -	Costa Rica

The women's 4 × 200 metre freestyle relay competition of the swimming events at the 1987 Pan American Games took place on 9 August at the Indiana University Natatorium. It was the first appearance of this event in the Pan American Games.

This race consisted of sixteen lengths of the pool. Each of the four swimmers completed four lengths of the pool. The first swimmer had to touch the wall before the second could leave the starting block.

== Results ==
All times are in minutes and seconds.

KEY:	q	Fastest non-qualifiers	Q	Qualified	GR	Games record	NR	National record	PB	Personal best	SB	Seasonal best

=== Final ===
The final was held on August 9.

Rank	Name	Nationality	Time	Notes
1st place, gold medalist(s)	Susan Habermas (2:03.34); Sara Linke (2:04.54); Pam Hayden (2:02.44); Whitney Hedgepeth (2:03.02)	United States	8:13.34	
2nd place, silver medalist(s)	Silvia Poll (1:58.36) - - -	Costa Rica	8:24.25	
3rd place, bronze medalist(s)	- - - -	Canada	8:25.69	
4	- - - -	Brazil	8:37.38	
5	- - - -	Mexico	8:55.18	
6	- - - -	Puerto Rico	8:57.51	
7	- - - -	-	-	
8	- - - -	-	-	
