= Michael Meldrum =

Canadian swimmer (born 1968)

Personal information
- Full name: Michael Meldrum
- National team: Canada
- Born: January 14, 1968 (age 58) Montreal, Quebec, Canada
- Height: 1.72 m (5 ft 8 in)
- Weight: 73 kg (161 lb)

Sport
- Sport: Swimming
- Strokes: Medley, freestyle
- College team: University of Calgary
Medal record
Men's swimming
Representing Canada
Pan American Games
Silver medal – second place	1987 Indianapolis	4x200 m freestyle
Bronze medal – third place	1987 Indianapolis	400 m medley

Michael Meldrum (born January 14, 1968) is a Canadian former individual medley swimmer who represented Canada at the 1988 Summer Olympics in Seoul, South Korea. There he finished in 23rd position in the 400-metre individual medley. He also participated in the World Championships, Commonwealth Games, Pan Pacs, and Pan Am Games.

Meldrum spent his career coaching swimmers with the Killarney Swim Club in Calgary, Alberta for over 20 years, until he retired in October 2025. He lives with his wife Tania Meldrum and his daughters Mackenzie Meldrum and Morgan Meldrum in Calgary, Alberta.

On June 18, 2025, Mike Meldrum won Lotto 6-49, taking home $5 million CAD.
