= Sigrid Niehaus =

Costa Rican swimmer (born 1969)

Personal information
- Born: 29 December 1969 (age 56)

Sport
- Sport: Swimming

Sigrid Niehaus (born 29 December 1969) is a Costa Rican swimmer. She competed in three events at the 1988 Summer Olympics.
