= Swimming at the 1987 Pan American Games – Women's 4 × 100 metre freestyle relay =

Women's 4 × 100 metre freestyle relay at the 1987 Pan American Games
- Venue: Indiana University Natatorium
- Dates: August 11 (preliminaries and finals)
- Competitors: from - nations

Medalists
Gold medal	Kathy Coffin, Jenny Thompson, Sara Linke and Carrie Steinseifer	United States
Silver medal	-, -, - and -	Canada
Bronze medal	-, -, - and -	Costa Rica

The women's 4 × 100 metre freestyle relay competition of the swimming events at the 1987 Pan American Games took place on 11 August at the Indiana University Natatorium. The last Pan American Games champion was the United States.

This race consisted of eight lengths of the pool, with each of the four swimmers completing two lengths. The first swimmer had to touch the wall before the second could leave the starting block.

== Results ==
All times are in minutes and seconds.

KEY:	q	Fastest non-qualifiers	Q	Qualified	GR	Games record	NR	National record	PB	Personal best	SB	Seasonal best

=== Final ===
The final was held on August 11.

Rank	Name	Nationality	Time	Notes
1st place, gold medalist(s)	Kathy Coffin (57.58); Jenny Thompson (56.58); Sara Linke (57.53); Carrie Steinseifer (56.99)	United States	3:48.68	
2nd place, silver medalist(s)	- - - -	Canada	3:52.25	
3rd place, bronze medalist(s)	Silvia Poll (55.52) - - -	Costa Rica	3:55.43	
4	- - - -	Brazil	3:57.92	
5	- - - -	Argentina	4:09.45	
6	- - - -	Puerto Rico	DQ	
7	- - - -	-	-	
8	- - - -	-	-	
