= Christopher Chalmers =

Canadian swimmer

Personal information
- Full name: Christopher Chalmers
- National team: Canada
- Born: November 8, 1967 (age 58) Kitchener, Ontario, Canada
- Height: 1.88 m (6 ft 2 in)
- Weight: 70 kg (150 lb)

Sport
- Sport: Swimming
- Strokes: Freestyle
- Club: London Aquatic Club
Medal record
Men's swimming
Representing Canada
Pan American Games
| Bronze medal – third place | 1987 Indianapolis | 1500 m freestyle |

Christopher Chalmers (born November 8, 1967) is a former freestyle swimmer from Canada. Chalmers competed at the 1988 Summer Olympics in Seoul, South Korea. There he finished in 16th position in the 1500-metre freestyle after competing in the preliminary heats.
