= Whitney Hedgepeth =

American swimmer (born 1971)

Personal information
- Full name: Whitney Lynn Hedgepeth
- National team: United States
- Born: March 19, 1971 (age 55) Charlottesville, Virginia, U.S.
- Height: 5 ft 10 in (1.78 m)
- Weight: 141 lb (64 kg)

Sport
- Sport: Swimming
- Strokes: Freestyle, backstroke, medley
- Club: Texas Aquatics
- College team: University of Florida; University of Texas
- Coach: Randy Reese, Jill Sterkel
Medal record
Event	1st	2nd	3rd
Olympic Games	1	2	0
World Championships (LC)	1	0	0
Pan Pacific Championships	2	0	1
Pan American Games	1	1	0
Summer Universiade	2	1	1
Total	7	4	2
Women's Swimming
Representing United States
Olympic Games
Gold medal – first place	1996 Atlanta	4x100 m medley
Silver medal – second place	1996 Atlanta	100 m backstroke
Silver medal – second place	1996 Atlanta	200 m backstroke
World Championships (LC)
Gold medal – first place	1991 Perth	4x100 m freestyle
Pan Pacific Championships
Gold medal – first place	1991 Edmonton	4x100 m freestyle
Gold medal – first place	1991 Edmonton	4x200 m freestyle
Bronze medal – third place	1995 Atlanta	200 m backstroke
Pan American Games
Gold medal – first place	1987 Indianapolis	4x200 m freestyle
Silver medal – second place	1987 Indianapolis	200 m freestyle
Summer Universiade
Gold medal – first place	1993 Buffalo	200 m backstroke
Gold medal – first place	1993 Buffalo	4x100 m freestyle
Silver medal – second place	1993 Buffalo	200 m freestyle
Bronze medal – third place	1993 Buffalo	200 m medley

Whitney Lynn Hedgepeth (born March 19, 1971) is an American former competition swimmer who won a gold and two silver medals at the 1996 Summer Olympics.

Hedgepeth was born in Charlottesville, Virginia. She reached the Olympic level as a swimmer for the Virginia Association for Competitive Swimming (VACS) under coach Dudley Duncan. Many Virginia Swimming LSC Records remain hers, over two decades later.

Hedgepeth initially attended the University of Florida in Gainesville, Florida, where she competed for coach Randy Reese's Florida Gators swimming and diving team in 1989–90. As a Gator swimmer, she won two NCAA national championships: the individual 200-meter freestyle, and as a member of the Gators' winning team in the 4×100-meter medley relay. She received seven All-American honors from her performance at the 1990 NCAA championships. Following her freshman year, she transferred to the University of Texas in Austin, Texas, and finished her NCAA career swimming for coach Jill Sterkel's Texas Longhorns swimming and diving team from 1992 to 1994. As a Texas Longhorn swimmer, she won three more NCAA national championships and received another twenty All-American honors, for a career total of twenty-seven.

She competed in the 200-meter individual medley at the 1988 Summer Olympics in Seoul, South Korea, finishing eighth in the final. At the 1996 Summer Olympics in Atlanta, Georgia, Hedgepeth won individual silver medals in the 100-meter backstroke and 200-meter backstroke events, and a gold medal as a member of the winning U.S. relay team in the women's 4×100-meter medley relay event.

Hedgepeth retired from competition swimming after the Atlanta Games, and became a swimming coach with Longhorn Aquatics in Austin. Since 2005, she was the masters' coach of the Longhorn Aquatics program. In 2013, she was honored as the Speedo U.S. Masters Swimming Coach of the Year.

She was inducted into the University of Texas' Longhorns Hall of Honor in 2007.

In 2010, Hedgepeth was inducted into the Virginia Sports Hall of Fame.

Hedgepeth's daughter, Dakota Luther, swam at the 2017 World Aquatics Championships, and placed 15th in the 200 m butterfly.

== See also ==
- List of Olympic medalists in swimming (women)
- List of University of Texas at Austin alumni
- List of World Aquatics Championships medalists in swimming (women)
