= Yang Wenyi =

Chinese swimmer

Personal information
- Born: January 11, 1972 (age 54)
Medal record
Women's swimming
Representing China
Olympic Games
Gold medal – first place	1992 Barcelona	50 m freestyle
Silver medal – second place	1988 Seoul	50 m freestyle
Silver medal – second place	1992 Barcelona	4x100 m freestyle
Pan Pacific Championships
Silver medal – second place	1989 Tokyo	50 m freestyle
Summer Universiade
Gold medal – first place	1991 Sheffield	50 m freestyle

Yang Wenyi (simplified Chinese: 杨文意; traditional Chinese: 楊文意; pinyin: Yáng Wényì; born January 11, 1972, in Shanghai) is a former freestyle and backstroke swimmer from China, whose best performance was winning the gold medal in the 50 m freestyle at the 1992 Summer Olympics in Barcelona, Spain and in the same year she won the same event at the 4th Asian Championships.

She was the first woman in history to go under the 25-seconds barrier in the 50m freestyle when she was 20 years old. She was one of "Five Golden Flowers" of Chinese swimming.

She was born in 1972 in Shanghai and she joined the national team and began intense training in 1986. During her career she broke national swimming records eighteen times.

After retirement, she owned "Jinyi Sports Promotion Ltd", holding sports contests and running "Yang Wenyi Swimming Club". The club is located in Minhang, Shanghai.

== High performances ==
- 1987 – Pan Pacific Swimming Championships

- Bronze – 4x100 m medley relay

- 1988 – Asian Swimming Championships

- Gold – 50 m freestyle (24.98 WR)
- Gold – 100 m backstroke (1:03.08, Asian best)
- Gold – 4x100 m medley relay
- Gold – 4x100m freestyle relay

- 1988 – Seoul Olympic Games

- Silver – 50 m freestyle

- 1990 – Beijing Asian Games

- Gold – 50 m freestyle
- Gold – 100 m backstroke
- Gold – 4x100 m freestyle relay

- 1991 – World University Games

- Gold – 50 m freestyle

- 1992 – Barcelona Olympic Games

- Gold – 50 m freestyle (24.79 WR)

== Honours ==
- 1989 – Selected one of National Top Ten Athletes
- 1989 – Voted one of forty Sports Stars in forty years since the founding of new China in 1949

== See also ==
- World record progression 50 metres freestyle

Records
Preceded by Tamara Costache	Women's 50 metre freestyle world record holder (long course); 11 April 1988 – 11 September 1994	Succeeded by Le Jingyi
