= Karin Helmstaedt =

Journalist (born 1966)

Personal information
- Born: December 29, 1966 (age 59) Fredericton, Canada

Sport
- Sport: Swimming
Medal record
Representing Canada
Pan American Games
Bronze medal – third place	1987 Indianapolis	200m individual medley
Bronze medal – third place	1987 Indianapolis	400m individual medley

Karin Helmstaedt (born 29 December 1966) is a journalist, presenter and former competitive swimmer with the Canadian national swimming team. Since 2003 she has presented the English-language Euromaxx culture and lifestyle show for Deutsche Welle on DW-TV.

== Education ==
Helmstaedt studied 'Physical and Health Education/ Literature' in Canada from 1985 to 1989 at the University of Toronto, then Literature Studies from 1989 to 1990 at McGill University. She then moved to France and studied French Literature at the Sorbonne in Paris. from 1991 to 1994. From 1994 to 1995 she studied for and received a Diplôme d'études universitaires générales (General Academic Studies Degree).

== Swimming ==
Helmstaedt began competitive swimming in 1978 with the Kingston Blue Marlins. Her specialty was the individual medley.

She was a finalist at the 1985 Summer Universiade (World Student Games) in Kobe, Japan. She reached the finals at the 1986 Commonwealth Games in Edinburgh, but came fourth by 2.32 seconds to fellow Canadian Jane Kerr. She was also a finalist at the 1986 World Aquatics Championships in Madrid, Spain.

In 1987 she was Canadian intercollegiate female swimmer of the year. At the 1987 Pan American Games in Indianapolis, Indiana she got bronze medals in both the 200 and 400-metre individual medleys.

After moving to France Helmstaed won gold in 1989 at the French national championships. From 1991 to 1994 she swam for the French national club champions.

=== Awards ===
Among other awards, Helmstaedt was inducted into the Kingston and District Sports Hall of Fame in 2007, University of Toronto Sports Hall of Fame in 2010, and into the Ontario Aquatic Hall of Fame in 2011.

== Journalism ==
While studying in France Helmstaedt began writing and working as a translator and presenter at sports events.

From 1993 to 2000 she was the international reporter for Swimnews Magazine. There she covered events including the World Championships in 1994 (Rome), 1996 (Perth) and the 1996 Olympic Games (Atlanta).

In 1997 she co-produced a prize-winning documentary "Staatsgeheimnis Kinderdoping". Her following work on doping brought her to Berlin in 1998, where she continued writing freelance for magazines and newspapers. She contributed to a book about the doping of child athletes in East Germany, Anklage, Kinderdoping: das Erbe des DDR-Sports, published 1999. That year she was Press Officer for the FINA Swimming World Cup.

She joined Deutsche Welle's television channel as a news translator and speaker. During 1998 through 2000 she reported extensively on sports doping in East Germany. In 1999 she began as presenter of "Germany Today". From 2003 she has presented the English-language Euromaxx culture and lifestyle show on DW-TV.

== Personal life ==
Helmstaedt was born on 29 December 1966 in Fredericton, New Brunswick. Her father was German and her mother Canadian. She has German-Canadian dual nationality and speaks English, French and German. Helmstaedt is married and has two children. She resides in Berlin.
