= Montserrat Hidalgo =

Costa Rican swimmer (born 1968)

Personal information
- Born: January 3, 1968- Calle Blancos, Costa Rica
Medal record
Women's swimming
Representing Costa Rica
Pan American Games
| Bronze medal – third place | 1987 Indianapolis | 4x100m Medley |

Montserrat Hidalgo (born January 3, 1968, in Calle Blancos, Costa Rica) is a retired female breaststroke swimmer from Costa Rica, who won the bronze medal in the women's 4 × 100 m relay event at the 1987 Pan American Games. She swam for Costa Rica at the 1988 Summer Olympics.
