= Natalia Trefilova =

Soviet swimmer

Nataliya Trefilova
Personal information
- Full name: Nataliya Trefilova
- Nationality: Russian
- Born: 1 July 1971 (age 55) Kirov, Russian SFSR, Soviet Union
- Height: 1.74 m (5 ft 9 in)
- Weight: 66 kg (146 lb)

Sport
- Sport: Swimming
- Strokes: Freestyle
Medal record
Women's swimming
Representing Soviet Union
Summer Universiade
Bronze medal – third place	1991 Sheffield	200 m freestyle

Natalia Trefilova (also Nataliya), born 1 July 1971, is a former freestyle swimmer from the Soviet Union.

Natalia competed at the 1988 Summer Olympic Games in Seoul, Korea, in the 100, 200, 400, & 800 metre freestyles, & the 4 x 100 metre freestyle relay.

Her effort in the 100 metre freestyle saw her finish first in the B Final in a time of 56.48 seconds.

In the 200 metre freestyle, Natalia achieved her best individual result of the meet, finishing fifth in the Championship Final in 1 minute 59.24 seconds.
