= Andrey Aguilar =

Costa Rican swimmer (born 1960)

Personal information
- Full name: Andrey Aguilar Komissarov
- Born: November 18, 1960 (age 65)

Sport
- Sport: Swimming
Medal record
Representing Costa Rica
Central American and Caribbean Games
Gold medal – first place	1982 Havana	200m individual medley

Andrey Aguilar Komissarov (born 18 November 1960) is a Costa Rican former swimmer who competed in the 1980 Summer Olympics and in the 1984 Summer Olympics. His sister is freestyle swimmer Natasha Aguilar.
