= Leigh Ann Fetter =

American swimmer

Personal information
- Full name: Leigh Ann Fetter
- National team: United States
- Born: May 23, 1969 (age 57) Louisville, Kentucky, U.S.
- Height: 5 ft 11 in (1.80 m)
- Weight: 134 lb (61 kg)

Sport
- Sport: Swimming
- Strokes: Freestyle
- Club: Lakeside Swim Club; Louisville, Kentucky
- College team: University of Texas
- Coach: Mark Schubert
Medal record
Women's swimming
Representing the United States
World Championships (LC)
Silver medal – second place	1991 Perth	50 m freestyle
Pan Pacific Championships
Gold medal – first place	1989 Tokyo	4x100 m medley
Bronze medal – third place	1989 Tokyo	50 m freestyle

Leigh Ann Fetter (born May 23, 1969), later known by her married name Leigh Ann Witt, is an American former competition swimmer and accomplished coach who represented the United States at the 1988 Summer Olympics in Seoul, South Korea.

== Early life and swimming ==
Leigh Ann Fetter was born to Sherl and Rose Fetter in Louisville, Kentucky and grew up in Louisville's East End. She spent several summers beginning as a child of eight swimming for Louisville's Douglass Hills swim team, where she would later coach. She did not begin competitive year-round swimming until her sophomore year, for Sacred Heart Academy in Louisville, where she attended high school.

She swam with the Lakeside Seahawks Team as a high school junior, at Lakeside Swim Club, a large club originally founded in 1924 in a rock quarry. She began to excel in swimming at Lakeside as a junior and as a senior under Head Coach Monty Hopkins, colleges began to take notice when she finished sixth in the Senior National Championships. She won the Kentucky State Swimming Championships in the 50-yard free in both 1986 and 1987, and in the 100-yard free in 1987. Her 1987 record Kentucky High School Time in the 50-yard freestyle was 23.96 seconds.

== 1988 Seoul Olympics ==
Fetter finished fifth in the final of the women's 50-meter freestyle in a time of 25.78 seconds. She came closer to receiving a medal than known in the immediate results, as three competitors to finish above her were later disqualified after testing positive for performance-enhancing drugs.

=== University of Texas swimming ===
Fetter attended the University of Texas at Austin, and swam for the Texas Longhorns swimming and diving team in National Collegiate Athletic Association (NCAA) competition from 1987 to 1991. During her college years, she was coached primarily by Texas's head Women's Coach Mark Schubert, a Hall of Fame and Olympic Coach. She won a total of seven NCAA titles while swimming for Texas, with four in the 50 free, and three in the 100 free, and retained the school record in the 50 free as of 2004.

She was the first woman to ever swim the 50-yard freestyle in under 22 seconds, and won the NCAA individual national championship in the event four consecutive years. She was also a key points contributor to the Lady Longhorns' NCAA national team championships in 1988, 1990 and 1991.

=== International compeitition ===
Fetter swam in the World Championships in 1991 in Perth, Australia, winning a silver medal in the 50 free. In the 1989 Pan Pacific Championships in Tokyo, she won a gold in the 4 x 100 meter medley relay, and a bronze in her signature event, the 50-meter freestyle. She received a Gold in the 1990 Good Will Games.

== Coaching swimming ==
=== College coaching ===
After completing her competitive swimming years, she was an Assistant Coach for Florida State beginning in the Fall of 1993 and was later named Head Coach of the Women's Swimming and Diving Team at James Madison in September 1995.

=== Coaching at Douglass Hills ===
By 1999 Fetter returned to her hometown to coach Louisville's Douglass Hills team. In the winter months she coached the Louisville Tritons Swim Club. Douglass Hills was a competitive age group team with over a hundred swimmers in the Louisville Swim Association Summer League, and met around seven or eight weeks in the summer. She won a number of the League's Summer Championships, including eight in a row between 1999 and 2007. Her Douglass Hills team also won the Red Division Title from 2000 to 2003, an honor given to the largest team leagues. By 2004, her two daughters also swam for the team and Leigh Ann competed during meet halftimes with a swim team composed of several of Douglass Hill's parents.

=== Lincoln Southwest High School ===
From around 2015–2019, Fetter coached Lincoln Southwest High School in Lincoln, Nebraska leading the team to three consecutive state championships from 2016 to 2018. Lincoln's team's first swimming and diving championship was in 2014, which was also the first swim and dive championship for a Lincoln school since 1999. In 2017 the girls' swimming team was first at state, and set five individual state records for individual events. Dominating the state championships in 2017, Lincoln Girls scored a meet record number of points and for the second straight year won nine of eleven events. During this period, she also coached the Greater Nebraska Swim Team, as did her husband Mike Witt, who also coached Lincoln Pius X, a rival swim team.

=== Alamo Area Aquatics ===
In September 2019, Fetter accepted a position as the Head Age Group Coach at Alamo Area Aquatics Association. She manages swimming at one of America's most modern facilities. Leigh Ann has stated the one thing she always tells her swimmers is to “Move their butts” while swimming.

=== Honors ===
In recognition of her Collegiate NCAA championships, Fetter received the Honda Sports Award for Swimming and Diving, recognizing her as the outstanding college female swimmer of the year in 1990–91. She was inducted into the University of Texas Longhorn Hall of Honor in 2003.

She was later inducted into the Texas Swimming and Diving Hall of Fame in Austin.

== See also ==
- List of University of Texas at Austin alumni
- List of World Aquatics Championships medalists in swimming (women)
