= Patrícia Amorim =

Brazilian swimmer

Patricia Amorim
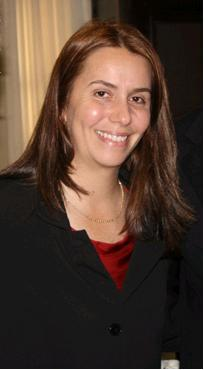

Personal information
- Full name: Patricia Filler Amorim
- Born: February 13, 1969 (age 57) Rio de Janeiro, Rio de Janeiro, Brazil
- Height: 1.65 m (5 ft 5 in)
- Weight: 53 kg (117 lb)

Sport
- Sport: Swimming
- Strokes: Freestyle

Patrícia Filler Amorim (born February 13, 1969, in Rio de Janeiro) is a Jewish Brazilian former Olympic freestyle swimmer and former president of Clube de Regatas do Flamengo. She is the first female president ever of the club, elected on December 7, 2009.

She was born to a bossa nova bassist and a primary school teacher. When Amorim was 3 years old, her sister Paula who had asthma was recommended by a doctor to take up swimming to help with her asthma. Amorim started swimming by going along with Paula to the swimming classes. At 5 years old, Amorim swam across Guanabara Bay in Rio. She represented her native country at the 1988 Summer Olympics in Seoul, South Korea. She retired from swimming in 1991.

At the 1986 World Aquatics Championships in Madrid, Amorim finished 25th in the 200m freestyle, 24th in the 400m freestyle, and 20th in the 800m freestyle.

She was at the 1987 Pan American Games, in Indianapolis, where she finished 4th in the 4×200-metre freestyle, and 5th in the 200-metre, 400-metre and 800-metre freestyle.

At the 1988 Summer Olympics in Seoul, Amorim finished 11th in the 4×100-metre medley, 21st in the 800-metre freestyle, 24th in the 400-metre freestyle, and 25th in the 200-metre freestyle.

Amorim won both the 400 m and 800 m freestyle gold medals at the 1989 Maccabiah Games in Israel.

Amorim broke the South American record of the 400-metre freestyle at the 1988 Summer Olympics, with a time of 4:19.64. The record lasted 10 years, and was only broken in 1998 by Nayara Ribeiro.

Amorim also broke several South American records in the 800-metre free, the first in 1985 and the last in 1988 Seoul: 8:51.95. Her record lasted until 1999, when Ana Muniz did 8:48.53. She is the person who most often hit the Brazilian record of 800-metre freestyle, six times.

Amorim is married to Fernando Sihman and has four children.

On December 3, 2012, in spite of running for Flamengo's presidency re-election, she was defeated by Eduardo Bandeira de Mello.
