= Marcela Cuesta =

Costa Rican swimmer (born 1972)

Personal information
- Born: March 31, 1972 (age 54)
Medal record
Women's swimming
Representing Costa Rica
Pan American Games
Silver medal – second place	1987 Indianapolis	4x200m Freestyle
Bronze medal – third place	1987 Indianapolis	4x100m Freestyle
Bronze medal – third place	1987 Indianapolis	4x100m Medley

Marcela Cuesta (born March 31, 1972) is a retired female butterfly and freestyle swimmer from Costa Rica, who won three medals (one silver and two bronze) with the women's relay team at the 1987 Pan American Games. She represented her native country at the 1988 Summer Olympics in Seoul, South Korea.
