= Swimming at the 1987 Pan American Games =

The swimming competition at the 1987 Pan American Games took place from August to August 15 at the Indiana University Natatorium in Indianapolis, Indiana, USA.

The highlights were the great performances from Anthony Nesty (a gold and bronze) and Silvia Poll (three golds, three silvers and two bronzes), originating in countries with little tradition in swimming (Suriname and Costa Rica, respectively), who obtained great results in this edition of the Games. Also featured for Hilton Woods, from the small Netherlands Antilles, who won the first medal in the history of his country in swimming at Pan American Games, a bronze in the men's 50 m free. Mark Andrews, from Trinidad and Tobago, did the same for his country.

== Results ==
=== Men’s events ===
Event	Gold		Silver		Bronze	
50 m freestyle	Tom Williams (USA)	22.55	Michael Neuhofel (USA)	22.84	Claude Lamy (CAN); Hilton Woods (AHO)	23.39
100 m freestyle	Todd Dudley (USA)	50.24	Scott McCadam (USA)	50.81	Mark Andrews (TRI)	51.24
200 m freestyle	John Witchel (USA)	1:50.90	Carlos Scanavino (URU)	1:51.21	Brian Jones (USA)	1:52.11
400 m freestyle	Paul Robinson (USA)	3:54.44	Cristiano Michelena (BRA)	3:55.37	Scott Brackett (USA)	3:55.64
1500 m freestyle	Alex Kostich (USA)	15:20.90	Lars Jorgensen (USA)	15:24.09	Chris Chalmers (CAN)	15:30.51
100 m backstroke	Andrew Gill (USA)	56.56	David Berkoff (USA)	57.35	Alejandro Alvizuri (PER)	58.65
200 m backstroke	Mike O'Brien (USA)	2:02.29	Ricardo Prado (BRA)	2:03.75	Ray Brown (CAN)	2:04.28
100 m breaststroke	Richard Korhammer (USA)	1:03.85	Dave Lundberg (USA)	1:04.11	Darcy Wallingford (CAN)	1:04.55
200 m breaststroke	Jeff Kubiak (USA)	2:17.62	Mike Barrowman (USA)	2:19.29	Darcy Wallingford (CAN)	2:22.01
100 m butterfly	Anthony Nesty (SUR)	53.89	Wade King (USA)	54.33	Michael Dillon (USA)	54.45
200 m butterfly	Bill Stapleton (USA)	2:00.70	Jayme Taylor (USA)	2:00.73	Anthony Nesty (SUR)	2:01.09
200 m individual medley	Bill Stapleton (USA)	2:03.58	Paul Wallace (USA)	2:04.92	Ricardo Prado (BRA)	2:04.94
400 m individual medley	Jerry Frentsos (USA)	4:23.92	Jeff Prior (USA)	4:26.31	Mike Meldrum (CAN)	4:29.63
4 × 100 m freestyle relay	UNITED STATES; Jim Born; Scott McCadam; Paul Robinson; Todd Dudley	3:19.97	CANADA; Darren Ward; Claude Lamy; Brad Creelman; Gary Vandermeulen	3:26.09	BRAZIL; Jorge Fernandes; Cristiano Michelena; Cyro Delgado; Júlio César Rebolal	3:27.11
4 × 200 m freestyle relay	UNITED STATES; Paul Robinson; Brian Jones; Mike O'Brien; John Witchel	7:23.29	CANADA; Darren Ward; Chris Chalmers; Gary Vandermeulen; Mike Meldrum	7:29.84	BRAZIL; Jorge Fernandes; Cristiano Michelena; Cyro Delgado; Júlio César Rebolal	7:29.92
4 × 100 m medley relay	UNITED STATES; Andrew Gill; Richard Korhammer; Wade King; Todd Dudley	3:43.65	CANADA; Ray Brown; Darcy Wallingford; Darren Ward; Claude Lamy	3:49.77	BRAZIL; Jorge Fernandes; Otavio Silva; Cícero Tortelli; Ricardo Prado	3:50.29

=== Women’s events ===
Event	Gold		Silver		Bronze	
50 m freestyle	Jenny Thompson (USA)	26.09	Silvia Poll (CRC)	26.32	Jeanne Doolan (USA)	26.34
100 m freestyle	Silvia Poll (CRC)	56.39	Sara Linke (USA)	57.30	Jenny Thompson (USA)	57.46
200 m freestyle	Silvia Poll (CRC)	2:00.02	Whitney Hedgepeth (USA)	2:02.06	Sara Linke (USA)	2:04.00
400 m freestyle	Julie Martin (USA)	4:11.87	Barbara Metz (USA)	4:13.25	Megan Holliday (CAN)	4:20.78
800 m freestyle	Tami Bruce (USA)	8:34.72	Deborah Babashoff (USA)	8:42.77	Megan Holliday (CAN)	8:52.60
100 m backstroke	Silvia Poll (CRC)	1:02.18	Holly Green (USA)	1:03.15	Michelle Donahue (USA)	1:03.30
200 m backstroke	Katie Welch (USA)	2:13.65	Silvia Poll (CRC)	2:14.18	Holly Green (USA)	2:14.75
100 m breaststroke	Keltie Duggan (CAN)	1:12.46	Lori Heisick (USA)	1:12.52	Terri Baxter (USA)	1:12.99
200 m breaststroke	Dorsey Tierney (USA)	2:36.87	Alicia María Boscatto (ARG)	2:37.09	Kathy Smith (USA)	2:37.57
100 m butterfly	Janel Jorgensen (USA)	1:01.28	Kristen Elias (USA)	1:01.54	Robin Ruggiero (CAN)	1:03.67
200 m butterfly	Kara McGrath (USA)	2:12.54	Michelle Griglione (USA)	2:15.03	Shay McNicol (CAN)	2:17.78
200 m individual medley	Susan Habermas (USA)	2:18.22	Catherine Ritch (USA)	2:20.06	Karin Helmstaedt (CAN)	2:21.59
400 m individual medley	Tami Bruce (USA)	4:49.34	Katie Welch (USA)	4:51.32	Karin Helmstaedt (CAN)	4:57.04
4 × 100 m freestyle relay	UNITED STATES; Kathy Coffin; Jenny Thompson; Sara Linke; Carrie Steinseifer	3:48.68	CANADA; Cheryl McArton; Robin Ruggiero; Manon Simard; Denise Gereghty	3:52.25	COSTA RICA; Natasha Aguilar; Marcela Cuesta; Carolina Mauri; Silvia Poll	3:55.43
4 × 200 m freestyle relay	UNITED STATES; Susan Habermas; Sara Linke; Pam Hayden; Whitney Hedgepeth	8:13.34	COSTA RICA; Natasha Aguilar; Marcela Cuesta; Carolina Mauri; Silvia Poll	8:24.25	CANADA; Denise Gereghty; Cheryl McArton; Sally Gilbert; Anne-Marie Anderson	8:25.69
4 × 100 m medley relay	UNITED STATES; Holly Green; Lori Heisick; Janel Jorgensen; Sara Linke	4:12.92	CANADA; Manon Simard; Keltie Duggan; Robin Ruggiero; Cheryl McArton	4:17.78	COSTA RICA; Silvia Poll; Montserrat Hidalgo; Marcela Cuesta; Carolina Mauri	4:23.11

== Medal table ==
Rank	Nation	Gold	Silver	Bronze	Total
1	United States	27	20	10	57
2	Costa Rica	3	3	2	8
3	Canada	1	5	13	19
4	Suriname	1	0	1	2
5	Brazil	0	2	4	6
6	Argentina	0	1	0	1
6	Uruguay	0	1	0	1
8	Netherlands Antilles	0	0	1	1
8	Peru	0	0	1	1
8	Trinidad and Tobago	0	0	1	1
Totals (10 entries)		32	32	33	97
