= Marie-Thérèse Armentero =

Swiss swimmer (born 1965)

Personal information
- Born: 13 November 1965 (age 60)
- Height: 1.80 m (5 ft 11 in)
- Weight: 67 kg (148 lb)

Sport
- Sport: Swimming
- Club: Genève Natation 1885, Genève; Varsity Blues, Toronto
Medal record
Representing Switzerland
World Championships
Bronze medal – third place	1986 Madrid	50 m freestyle
Summer Universiade
Silver medal – second place	1987 Zagreb	50 m freestyle

Marie-Thérèse Armentero (born 13 November 1965) is a Swiss swimmer who won a bronze medal in the 50 m freestyle at the 1986 World Aquatics Championships. She competed at the 1984 and 1988 Summer Olympics with the best achievement of sixth place in the 4 × 100 m medley relay in 1984.

During 1986–88 she was studying and training at the University of Toronto. There she swam the fastest ever 50 m freestyle race in Canada, setting a Canadian Interuniversity Sport (CIS) record that stood for at least 18 years. She also won a silver medal at the 1987 Summer Universiade and nine Ontario Women's Interuniversity Athletic Association (OWIAA) and seven CIS titles. In 1988 she was chosen the CIS Female Swimmer of the Year. After retirement she competed in the masters category and in 2003 set a European record in the 50 m freestyle. In 2006, she was inducted to the University of Toronto Sports Hall of Fame.
