= Svetlana Isakova (swimmer) =

Latvian swimmer (born 1969)

Personal information
- Nationality: Latvian
- Born: 18 December 1969 (age 56) Yoshkar-Ola, Russia, Soviet Union

Sport
- Sport: Swimming

Svetlana Isakova (born 18 December 1969) is a Soviet freestyle swimmer. She competed in two events at the 1988 Summer Olympics representing the Soviet Union.

11xUSSR champion (1986–1990), 5xUSSR Cup winner (1985, 1987). Member of Soviet national team in 1986–1989. European champion in relay (1989). During her career she represented city of Yoshkar-Ola (Mari El Republic, Russian SFSR), later moved to Riga, Latvia.
