= Bryan Alvaréz =

Costa Rican swimmer (born 1999)

Personal information
- Born: 4 September 1999 (age 26)

Sport
- Sport: Swimming

Bryan Alvaréz (born 4 September 1999) is a Costa Rican swimmer. He competed in the men's 50 metre butterfly event at the 2017 World Aquatics Championships. In 2019, he represented Costa Rica at the 2019 World Aquatics Championships held in Gwangju, South Korea.
