= Ayako Nakano (swimmer) =

Japanese swimmer (born 1973)

Personal information
- Nationality: Japanese
- Born: April 3, 1973 (age 53) Kanagawa, Japan
- Height: 1.70 m (5 ft 7 in)
- Weight: 57 kg (126 lb)

Sport
- Sport: Swimming
- Strokes: Freestyle
Medal record
Women's swimming
Representing Japan
Pan Pacific Championships
Silver medal – second place	1991 Edmonton	4x100 m freestyle
Silver medal – second place	1991 Edmonton	4x200 m freestyle
Summer Universiade
Bronze medal – third place	1993 Buffalo	100m freestyle

Ayako Nakano (中野 亜弥子, Nakano Ayako; born 3 April 1973) is a Japanese former swimmer who competed in the 1988 Summer Olympics and in the 1992 Summer Olympics.
