= Cina Munch =

Fijian swimmer

Personal information
- Born: 17 June 1971 (age 55)

Sport
- Sport: Swimming

Cina Munch (born 17 June 1971) is a Fijian former swimmer. She competed in four events at the 1988 Summer Olympics.
