= Bryndís Ólafsdóttir =

Icelandic swimmer (born 1969)

Personal information
- Born: 17 August 1969 (age 56)

Sport
- Sport: Swimming

Bryndís Ólafsdóttir (born 17 August 1969) is a retired Icelandic freestyle swimmer. She competed in three events at the 1988 Summer Olympics.
