= Adriana Pereira =

Brazilian swimmer (born 1964)

Personal information
- Full name: Adriana Salazar Lopes Pereira
- Born: August 20, 1964 (age 61) Pernambuco, Brazil
- Height: 1.76 m (5 ft 9 in)
- Weight: 69 kg (152 lb)

Sport
- Sport: Swimming
- Strokes: Freestyle, Butterfly

Adriana Salazar Lopes Pereira (born August 20, 1964) is a former Olympic freestyle swimmer from Brazil.

She was at the 1979 Pan American Games, in San Juan, Puerto Rico, where she finished 5th in the 4×100-metre freestyle, 8th in the 100-metre butterfly, and was disqualified at the 200-metre butterfly.

She was at the 1983 Pan American Games, in Caracas.

Pereira was classified to compete in the 1984 Summer Olympics in Los Angeles, but she decided to abandon the swim. Later, she returned to swim.

At the 1986 World Aquatics Championships in Madrid, Pereira finished 19th in the 50-metre freestyle, 33rd in the 100-metre butterfly, and 36th in the 100-metre freestyle.

She was at the 1987 Pan American Games, in Indianapolis, where she finished 5th in the 50-metre freestyle.

At the 1988 Summer Olympics in Seoul, she finished 11th in the 4×100-metre freestyle, 17th in the 50-metre freestyle, and 34th in the 100-metre freestyle.

She was Brazilian and South American record holder of the 50-metre and 100-metre freestyle. In 1982, Adriana Pereira debuted the Brazilian women's 50-metre freestyle record, swimming in 27.10 seconds. On 1989, she broke the South American record of the 50-metre freestyle for the last time, with a time of 26.24 seconds. The record was only beaten in 2000 by Flávia Delaroli. In the 100-metre freestyle, she broke the South American record for the first time, on 1981, with a time of 59.50 seconds. The last record of 100-metre freestyle made by Adriana fell in 1996. She was also the Brazilian record holder of the 100-metre butterfly, with a time of 1:04.66.
