= María Rivera (swimmer) =

Mexican swimmer (born 1967)

Personal information
- Born: 16 June 1967 (age 59) Saltillo, Mexico

Sport
- Sport: Swimming
Medal record
Representing Mexico
Pan American Games
Bronze medal – third place	1991 Havana	4x200m freestyle relay
Central American and Caribbean Games
Gold medal – first place	1990 Mexico City	50m freestyle

María Rivera (born 16 June 1967) is a Mexican former swimmer. She competed in two events at the 1988 Summer Olympics.
