= Angela Birch =

Fijian swimmer

Personal information
- Born: 24 August 1974 (age 52)

Sport
- Sport: Swimming

Angela Birch (born 24 August 1974) is a Fijian former swimmer. She competed in five events at the 1988 Summer Olympics.
