= Catherine Fogarty =

Zimbabwean swimmer (born 1971)

Personal information
- Born: 28 May 1971 (age 55)

Sport
- Sport: Swimming

Catherine Helen Fogarty (born 28 May 1971) is a Zimbabwean former freestyle swimmer. She competed in three events at the 1988 Summer Olympics.
