= Cheryl McArton =

Canadian swimmer

Personal information
- Born: 25 April 1966 (age 60) Ottawa, Ontario, Canada

Sport
- Sport: Swimming
- Club: Etobicoke Swim Club
Medal record
Representing Canada
Pan American Games
Silver medal – second place	1987 Indianapolis	4x100m freestyle relay
Silver medal – second place	1987 Indianapolis	4x100m medley relay
Bronze medal – third place	1987 Indianapolis	4x200m freestyle relay

Cheryl McArton (born 25 April 1966) is a Canadian swimmer. She competed in the women's 4 × 100 metre freestyle relay at the 1984 Summer Olympics.
