= Carolina Araujo (swimmer) =

Mozambican swimmer

Personal information
- Born: 11 June 1971 (age 55)

Sport
- Sport: Swimming

Carolina Araujo (born 11 June 1971) is a Mozambican former backstroke and freestyle swimmer. She competed in three events at the 1988 Summer Olympics.
