= Kaori Sasaki =

Japanese swimmer (born 1971)

Personal information
- Born: April 27, 1971 (age 55)

Sport
- Sport: Swimming

Kaori Sasaki (佐々木 香織, Sasaki Kaori; born 27 April 1971) is a Japanese former swimmer who competed in the 1988 Summer Olympics.
