= Tamara Costache =

Romanian swimmer

Medal record

Women's swimming

Representing Romania

World Championships
Gold medal – first place	1986 Madrid	50m freestyle

European Championships
Gold medal – first place	1987 Strasbourg	50m freestyle
Bronze medal – third place	1987 Strasbourg	100m freestyle

Tamara Virgi Costache (born 23 July 1970) is an Olympic and former world record-holding freestyle swimmer from Romania. She swam for Romania at the 1988 Olympics.

Costache may be considered the earliest pioneer of specialised 50 freestyle sprinting for women. She first set the world record for the 50 metre freestyle when competing at the Romanian National Championships in Bucharest on 16 July 1986. Her time was 25.50 seconds, set in a preliminary heat.

Costache competed at the 1986 World Aquatics Championships, winning the gold medal in the 50 metre freestyle on 23 August in a world record time of 25.28 seconds. As of February 2018, this time is still the Romanian Record in the event.

Her achievements at the 1988 Summer Olympics two years later were less successful. Although qualifying for the final of the 50 metre freestyle, she could manage no better than sixth place in a time of 25.80 seconds, 0.52 seconds slower than her personal best.

She competed in the 100 metre freestyle in Seoul also, but did no better than 8th place in the B Final with a time of 57.11 seconds. Her preliminary time was slightly better at 56.79 seconds.

== See also ==
- World record progression 50 metres freestyle
