= Natasha Aguilar =

Costa Rican swimmer (1970–2016)

Natasha Aguilar Komissarova
- At the 1987 Pan American Games. (3rd person from right)

Personal information
- Born: June 2, 1970 Costa Rica
- Died: January 1, 2016 (aged 45)
Medal record
Women's swimming
Representing Costa Rica
Pan American Games
Silver medal – second place	1987 Indianapolis	4x200m Freestyle
Bronze medal – third place	1987 Indianapolis	4x100m Freestyle

Natalia Irina "Natasha" Aguilar Komissarova (June 2, 1970 – January 1, 2016) was a female freestyle swimmer from Costa Rica who earned two medals (silver and bronze) with the women's relay team at the 1987 Pan American Games.

She also represented her native country at the 1988 Summer Olympics in Seoul, South Korea. Graduated from high school from Colegio La Salle in San Jose, Costa Rica. Her brother was Andrey Aguilar.

Aguilar died on January 1, 2016, of complications from a stroke after falling down the stairs. She was 45 years old.
