= Diana van der Plaats =

Dutch swimmer (born 1971)

Personal information
- Full name: Adriana van der Plaats
- Nickname: Diana
- Nationality: Dutch
- Born: 12 August 1971 (age 54) Utrecht
- Height: 1.82 m (6 ft 0 in)
- Weight: 66 kg (146 lb)

Sport
- Sport: Swimming
- Strokes: Freestyle
- Club: Zwemvereniging De Dolfijn
Medal record
Olympic Games
Silver medal – second place	1988 Seoul	4×100 m freestyle
European Championships (LC)
Gold medal – first place	1991 Athens	4×100 m freestyle
Silver medal – second place	1987 Strasbourg	4×100 m freestyle
Silver medal – second place	1989 Bonn	4×100 m freestyle
Silver medal – second place	1989 Bonn	4×200 m freestyle
Bronze medal – third place	1991 Athens	4×200 m freestyle

Adriana "Diana" van der Plaats (born 12 August 1971) is a former freestyle swimmer from the Netherlands, who competed in two consecutive Summer Olympics for her native country, starting in 1988. There she won the silver medal with the Dutch 4×100 m freestyle relay team, behind East Germany, after swimming in the qualifying heats. In the final she was replaced by Conny van Bentum. Three years later Van der Plaats captured the title in the 4×100 m freestyle relay at the 1991 European Aquatics Championships in Athens, Greece, and won the bronze in the 4×200 m freestyle relay.
