= Veronica Cummings =

Guamanian swimmer

Personal information
- Born: 29 March 1973 (age 53)

Sport
- Sport: Swimming

Veronica Cummings (born 29 March 1973) is a freestyle swimmer who represented Guam. She competed in two events at the 1988 Summer Olympics. She was the first woman to represent Guam at the Olympics.
