= Carolina Mauri =

Costa Rican swimmer (born 1969)

Personal information
- Full name: Carolina Mauri Carabaguias
- Born: November 13, 1969 (age 56)
Medal record
Women's swimming
Representing Costa Rica
Pan American Games
Silver medal – second place	1987 Indianapolis	4x200m Freestyle
Bronze medal – third place	1987 Indianapolis	4x100m Freestyle
Bronze medal – third place	1987 Indianapolis	4x100m Medley

Carolina Mauri Carabaguias (born November 13, 1969) is a freestyle swimmer from Costa Rica, who won three medals (one silver and two bronze) with the women's relay team at the 1987 Pan American Games. She represented her native country at the 1988 Summer Olympics in Seoul, South Korea. In the Seoul Olympics, she briefly held the Olympic record in the 50 meter freestyle event.

Ms Mauri is an attorney, holding a law degree from the University of Costa Rica, and Masters of Law degree in International Environmental Law from the Washington College of Law at American University in Washington, DC. She is an expert in biodiversity law and climate change law and policy. She was a negotiator for the Costa Rican national delegations to various conferences of the parties of U.N. Framework Convention on Climate Change. She worked for former Costa Rican President Oscar Arias-Sanchez in advancing Costa Rica's national "Peace with Nature" program, helping to coordinate the country's strategy to become "carbon neutral" by 2021.

On April 14, 2014 she was designated by Costa Rican President-elect Luis Guillermo Solis to serve as Minister of Sports and Recreation during his administration, taking office on May 8 for the period 2014–2018.
