= Senda Gharbi =

Tunisian swimmer (born 1967)

Personal information
- Born: 29 January 1967 (age 59)

Sport
- Sport: Swimming
Medal record
Representing Tunisia
African Games
Gold medal – first place	1987 Nairobi	50m freestyle
Gold medal – first place	1987 Nairobi	100m freestyle
Gold medal – first place	1987 Nairobi	200m freestyle
Mediterranean Games
Gold medal – first place	1991 Athens	100m freestyle
Silver medal – second place	1987 Latakia	100m freestyle
Bronze medal – third place	1991 Athens	50m freestyle

Senda Gharbi (born 29 January 1967) is a Tunisian swimmer. She competed in four events at the 1988 Summer Olympics.
