= Celeste Hung =

Hong Kong swimmer (born 1972)

Hung Cee Kay
Personal information
- Born: 2 March 1972 (age 54)

Sport
- Sport: Swimming
Medal record
Representing Hong Kong
Asian Games
Bronze medal – third place	1986 Seoul	4x100m freestyle relay

Celeste Hung Cee Kay (Chinese: 洪詩琪; Jyutping: hung4 si1 kei4; born 2 March 1972) is a Hong Kong butterfly and freestyle swimmer. She competed in five events at the 1988 Summer Olympics.

Hung trained at the Mantas Swimming Club along with Fenella Ng. In swimming at the 1986 Asian Games, she won bronze in the women's 4 × 100 m freestyle relay with Ng, Fu Mui, and Lee Sau-mei. She later became an executive director of Hop Hing (SEHK: 47), a Hong Kong restaurant operator.
