= Luminița Dobrescu =

Romanian swimmer

Personal information
- Born: April 19, 1971 (age 55) Reşiţa, Romania

Sport
- Sport: Swimming
Medal record
Representing Romania
European Championships
Silver medal – second place	1987 Strasbourg	4×200 m freestyle
Silver medal – second place	1993 Sheffield	200 m freestyle
Bronze medal – third place	1987 Strasbourg	200 m freestyle
Bronze medal – third place	1991 Athens	200 m freestyle

Luminiţa Liliana Dobrescu (born 19 April 1971) is a retired Romanian freestyle swimmer who won four medals at the 1987, 1991 and 1993 European Aquatics Championships. She also participated in the 1988, 1992 and 1996 Summer Olympics in various individual freestyle and team relay events; her best achievement was fifth place in the 200 m freestyle in 1992. Between 1986 and 1993, she won seven national titles.

== Education and career ==
Dobrescu graduated from the Faculty of Physical Education and Sport of the West University of Timișoara. She retired from competitive swimming around 1997, and worked as lifeguard and swimming coach. In September 2008, she received the title of Honorary Citizen of Reşiţa.
