= Zhuang Yong =

Chinese swimmer

Personal information
- Born: August 10, 1972 (age 53) Shanghai, China

Sport
- Sport: Swimming
Medal record
Representing China
Olympic Games
Gold medal – first place	1992 Barcelona	100 m freestyle
Silver medal – second place	1988 Seoul	100 m freestyle
Silver medal – second place	1992 Barcelona	50 m freestyle
Silver medal – second place	1992 Barcelona	4x100 m freestyle
World Championships (Long Course)
Gold medal – first place	1991 Perth	50 m freestyle
Bronze medal – third place	1991 Perth	100 m freestyle
Pan Pacific Championships
Gold medal – first place	1989 Tokyo	100 m freestyle
Bronze medal – third place	1989 Tokyo	200 m freestyle
Summer Universiade
Gold medal – first place	1991 Sheffield	100 m freestyle
Silver medal – second place	1991 Sheffield	50 m freestyle

Zhuang Yong (simplified Chinese: 庄泳; traditional Chinese: 莊泳; pinyin: Zhuāng Yǒng; born August 10, 1972) is a retired freestyle swimmer from China, whose best performance was winning the gold medal in the 100 m freestyle at the 1992 Summer Olympics in Barcelona, Spain. It was China's first gold medal in swimming. Four years earlier in Seoul she won China's first ever Olympic medal in swimming, ending up second in the final of the Women's 100 m Freestyle, behind East Germany's Kristin Otto.

== High performances ==
- 1985 – National Junior Games

- Winning three golds and three silvers

- 1987 – National Games

- Gold – 100 m Freestyle (56.22, Asian best and 10th world best result of the year)

- 1987 – Pan Pacific Swimming Championships

- Silver – 4x100 m Freestyle Relay

- 1988 – National Championships

- 5th World Best Result of the Year

- 1988 – Seoul Olympic Games

- Silver – 100 m Freestyle (55.47, Asian best and China's first Olympic medal in swimming)
- Fourth place – 4x100 m Freestyle Relay

- 1989 – Pan Pacific Swimming Championships

- Gold – 100 m Freestyle (breaking ARs in 100 m and 200 m Freestyle)

- 1990 – Asian Games

- Gold – 100 m Freestyle (55.30)
- Gold – 200 m Freestyle (2:01.43)
- Gold – 4x100 m Freestyle Relay (3:46.39)
- Gold – 4x100 m Medley Relay (4:11.74 )

- 1991 – World Championships

- Gold – 50 m Freestyle
- Bronze – 100 m Freestyle
- Sixth place – 200 m Freestyle (AR)

- 1992 – Barcelona Olympic Games

- Gold – 100 m Freestyle (OR)
- Silver – 50 m Freestyle
- Silver – 4x100 m Freestyle Relay

- 1993 – National Games

- One gold, one silver and one bronze

== Honours ==
- 1985 – Awarded the title of Master of Sports
- 1988 – Awarded the title of International Master of Sports
- 1987-1988 – Selected one of National Top Ten Swimmers
- 1988-1990 – Thrice Selected one of National Top Ten Athletes of the year
- 1990 – Named National "March 8th" Red-Banner Holder by the All-China Women's Federation
- 1994 – Voted one of 45 Sports Stars in 45 years since the founding of new China in 1949
