= Karen Dieffenthaler =

Trinidad and Tobago swimmer (born 1967)

Personal information
- Born: 15 November 1967 (age 58)

Sport
- Sport: Swimming

Karen Dieffenthaler (born 15 November 1967) is a swimmer from Trinidad and Tobago. She competed in three events at the 1988 Summer Olympics.
