= Silvia Poll =

Costa Rican swimmer (born 1970)

Sylvia Poll
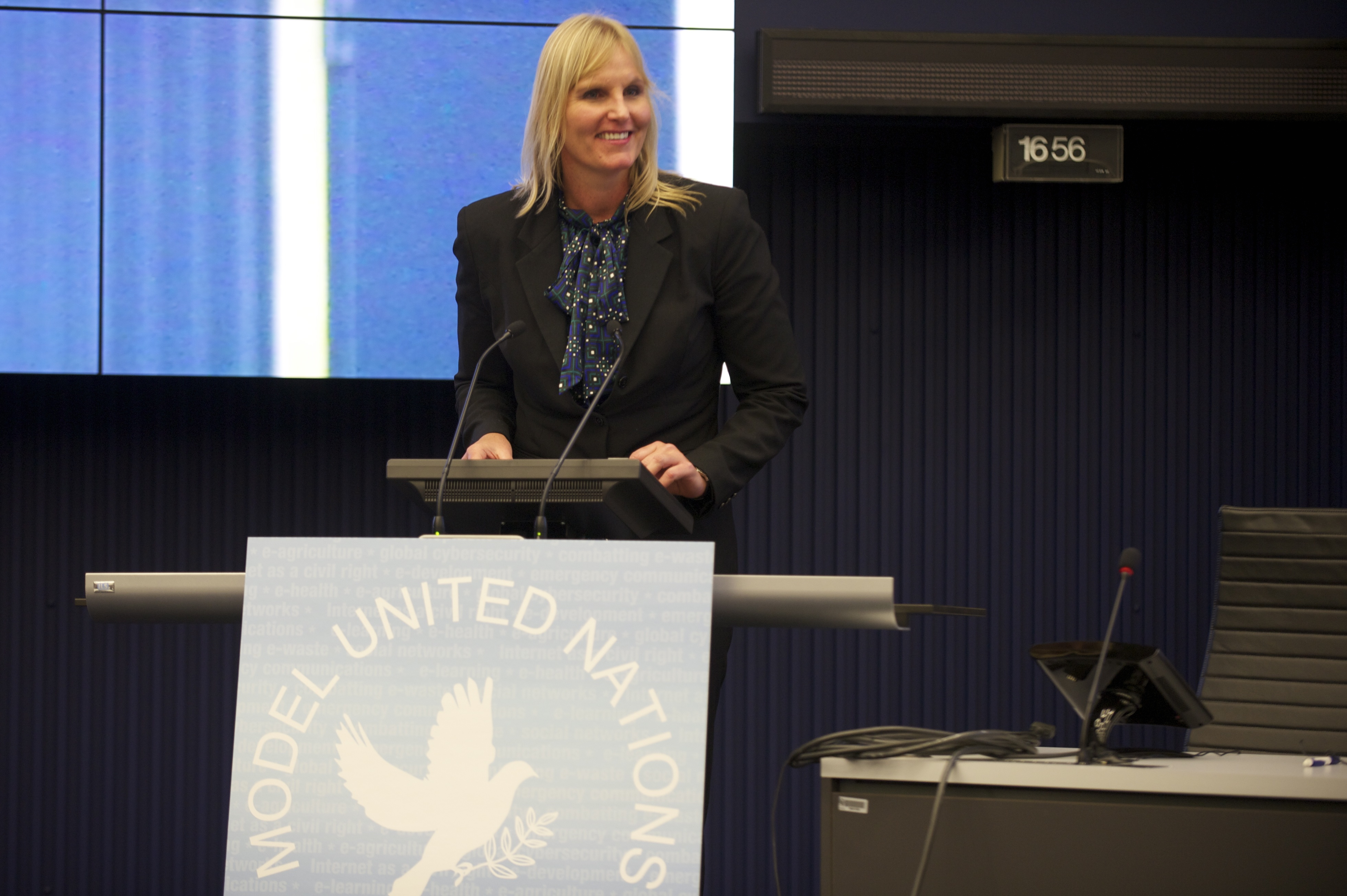

Personal information
- Full name: Sylvia Poll Ahrens
- Nationality: Costa Rican
- Born: September 24, 1970 (age 55) Managua, Nicaragua
- Height: 1.92 m (6 ft 4 in)
- Weight: 75 kg (165 lb)

Sport
- Sport: Swimming
- Strokes: Freestyle, backstroke
Medal record
Women's swimming
Representing Costa Rica
Olympic Games
Silver medal – second place	1988 Seoul	200 m freestyle
Pan Pacs
Bronze medal – third place	1991 Edmonton	100 m backstroke
Pan Am Games
Gold medal – first place	1991 Havana	100 m backstroke
Gold medal – first place	1987 Indianapolis	100 m freestyle
Gold medal – first place	1987 Indianapolis	200 m freestyle
Gold medal – first place	1987 Indianapolis	100 m backstroke
Silver medal – second place	1987 Indianapolis	50 m freestyle
Silver medal – second place	1987 Indianapolis	200 m backstroke
Silver medal – second place	1987 Indianapolis	4x200 m freestyle
Bronze medal – third place	1987 Indianapolis	4x100 m freestyle
Bronze medal – third place	1987 Indianapolis	4x100 m medley

Sylvia Úrsula Poll Ahrens (born September 24, 1970 in Managua, Nicaragua) is an Olympic medalist and a national record holding swimmer from Costa Rica. At the 1988 Olympics, she won Costa Rica's first Olympic medal, when she garnered the silver in the women's 200 free. As of 2025, she and her younger sister Claudia are Costa Rica's only Olympic medalists. Sylvia also swam for Costa Rica at the 1992 Summer Olympics.

She also won a total number of 8 medals at the 1987 Pan American Games; and 2 of her times from those Games still stand as Costa Rican Records in 2009 (100 free and 100 back).

Poll was born in Managua, Nicaragua. Her parents were Germans and they settled in Nicaragua where Sylvia and her younger sister Claudia were born. After the 1972 Nicaragua earthquake and rising political tensions, Sylvia's parents decided to move south to Costa Rica only shortly after Claudia's birth. She, her sister Claudia, and their mother are not related to Marlene Ahrens, another Olympic athlete and medalist and another Latin American-born daughter of German settlers.

Sylvia Poll is a famous backstroker and freestyle swimmer for Costa Rica, who won the silver medal in the Swimming at the 1988 Summer Olympics Women's 200 meter freestyle at the 1988 Summer Olympics in Seoul, South Korea. Her silver medal was the first medal ever for a Costa Rican athlete.

At the 1986 Central American and Caribbean Games she set the Games Records in the women's 200 and 400 frees (2:02.80 and 4:17.98). Both records would last 20 years, until her sister Claudia bettered the times at the 2006 Games. Also at the '86 CACs, Silvia set the Games Record in the 100 m and 200 m backstroke (1:04.43, 2:19.32) that also stood until 2006.

Sylvia Poll is now a member of the ‘Champions for Peace’ club, a group of 54 famous elite athletes committed to serving peace in the world through sport, created by Peace and Sport, a Monaco-based international organization.

== See also ==
- List of Costa Rican records in swimming
