= Swimming at the 1982 World Aquatics Championships =

The Swimming portion of the 4th FINA World Aquatics Championships swam late July-early August 1982 in Guayaquil, Ecuador. The competition featured 19 long course (50 m) events:

- freestyle - 100, 200, 400, 800 (female only) and 1500 (male only);
- backstroke - 100 and 200;
- breaststroke - 100 and 200;
- butterfly - 100 and 200;
- individual medley (IM) - 200 and 400; and
- relays - 4 × 100 free, 4 × 200 free (male only) and 4 × 100 medley.

== Results ==
=== Men ===
Event	Gold	Silver	Bronze
100 m freestyle	Jörg Woithe (GDR); 50.18 CR	Rowdy Gaines (USA); 50.21	Per Johansson (SWE); 50.25
200 m freestyle	Michael Groß (FRG); 1:49.84 CR	Rowdy Gaines (USA); 1:49.92	Jörg Woithe (GDR); 1:50.71
400 m freestyle	Vladimir Salnikov (URS); 3:51.30 CR	Svyatoslav Semenov (URS); 3:51.43	Sven Lodziewski (GDR); 3:51.84
1500 m freestyle	Vladimir Salnikov (URS); 15:01.77 CR	Svyatoslav Semenov (URS); 15:05.54	Darjan Petrič (YUG); 15:10.20
100 m backstroke	Dirk Richter (GDR); 55.95; CR	Rick Carey (USA); 56.04	Vladimir Shemetov (URS); 56.42
200 m backstroke	Rick Carey (USA); 2:00.82 CR	Sándor Wladár (HUN); 2:01.31	Frank Baltrusch (GDR); 2:01.51
100 m breaststroke	Steve Lundquist (USA); 1:02.75 CR	Victor Davis (CAN); 1:02.82	John Moffet (USA); 1:03.13
200 m breaststroke	Victor Davis (CAN); 2:14.77 WR	Robertas Žulpa (URS); 2:16.68	John Moffet (USA); 2:18.54
100 m butterfly	Matt Gribble (USA); 53.88 CR	Michael Groß (FRG); 54.26	Bengt Baron (SWE); 54.47
200 m butterfly	Michael Groß (FRG); 1:58.85 CR	Sergey Fesenko (URS); 1:59.91	Craig Beardsley (USA); 2:00.08
200 m individual medley	Aleksandr Sidorenko (URS); 2:03.30 CR	Bill Barrett (USA); 2:03.49	Giovanni Franceschi (ITA); 2:04.65
400 m individual medley	Ricardo Prado (BRA); 4:19.78 WR	Jens-Peter Berndt (GDR); 4:23.02	Sergey Fesenko (URS); 4:23.29
4 × 100 m freestyle relay	United States (USA); Chris Cavanaugh; Robin Leamy; David McCagg; Rowdy Gaines; 3:19.26 WR	Soviet Union (URS); Sergey Krasyuk; Aleksey Filonov; Sergey Smiriyagin; Aleksey Markovsky; 3:21.78	Sweden (SWE); Per Johansson; Bengt Baron; Pelle Holmertz; Pelle Wikström; 3:22.15
4 × 200 m freestyle relay	United States (USA); Richard Saeger; Jeff Float; Kyle Miller; Rowdy Gaines; 7:21.09	Soviet Union (URS); Vladimir Shemetov; Ivar Stukolkin; Vladimir Salnikov; Aleksey Filonov; 7:24.91	West Germany (FRG); Andreas Schmidt; Dirk Korthals; Rainer Henkel; Michael Groß; 7:25.46
4 × 100 m medley relay	United States (USA); Rick Carey; Steve Lundquist; Matt Gribble; Rowdy Gaines; 3:40.84 WR	Soviet Union (URS); Vladimir Shemetov; Yuriy Kis; Aleksey Markovsky; Sergey Smiriyagin; 3:42.86	West Germany (FRG); Stefan Peter; Gerald Mörken; Michael Groß; Andreas Schmidt; 3:44.78

Legend: WR – World record; CR – Championship record

=== Women ===
Event	Gold	Silver	Bronze
100 m freestyle	Birgit Meineke (GDR); 55.79	Annemarie Verstappen (NED); 55.87	Jill Sterkel (USA); 56.27
200 m freestyle	Annemarie Verstappen (NED); 1:59.53	Birgit Meineke (GDR); 2:00.67	Annelies Maas (NED); 2:00.84
400 m freestyle	Carmela Schmidt (GDR); 4:08.98	Petra Schneider (GDR); 4:10.08	Tiffany Cohen (USA); 4:11.85
800 m freestyle	Kim Linehan (USA); 8:27.48	Jackie Willmott (GBR); 8:32.61	Carmela Schmidt (GDR); 8:33.67
100 m backstroke	Kristin Otto (GDR); 1:01.30 CR	Ina Kleber (GDR); 1:01.47	Susan Walsh (USA); 1:02.86
200 m backstroke	Cornelia Sirch (GDR); 2:09.91 WR	Georgina Parkes (AUS); 2:14.98	Carmen Bunaciu (ROU); 2:15.40
100 m breaststroke	Ute Geweniger (GDR); 1:09.14 CR	Anne Ottenbrite (CAN); Kim Rhodenbaugh (USA); 1:11.03	—
200 m breaststroke	Svetlana Varganova (URS); 2:28.82 CR	Ute Geweniger (GDR); 2:29.71	Anne Ottenbrite (CAN); 2:33.05
100 m butterfly	Mary T. Meagher (USA); 59.41 CR	Ines Geißler (GDR); 1:00.36	Melanie Buddemeyer (USA); 1:00.40
200 m butterfly	Ines Geißler (GDR); 2:08.66 CR	Mary T. Meagher (USA); 2:09.76	Heike Dähne (GDR); 2:10.29
200 m individual medley	Petra Schneider (GDR); 2:11.79 CR	Ute Geweniger (GDR); 2:13.38	Tracy Caulkins (USA); 2:15.91
400 m individual medley	Petra Schneider (GDR); 4:36.10 WR	Kathleen Nord (GDR); 4:43.51	Tracy Caulkins (USA); 4:44.64
4 × 100 m freestyle relay	East Germany (GDR); Birgit Meineke; Susanne Link; Kristin Otto; Caren Metschuck; 3:43.97	United States (USA); Susan Habernigg; Kathy Treible; Beth Washut; Jill Sterkel; 3:45.76	Netherlands (NED); Annemarie Verstappen; Annelies Maas; Wilma van Velsen; Conny van Bentum; 3:45.96
4 × 100 m medley relay	East Germany (GDR); Kristin Otto; Ute Geweniger; Ines Geißler; Birgit Meineke; 4:05.88 WR	United States (USA); Susan Walsh; Kim Rhodenbaugh; Mary T. Meagher; Jill Sterkel; 4:08.12	Soviet Union (URS); Larisa Gorchakova; Svetlana Varganova; Natalya Pokas; Irina Gerasimova; 4:12.36

Legend: WR – World record; CR – Championship record

=== Medal standings ===
Rank	Nation	Gold	Silver	Bronze	Total
1	East Germany (GDR)	12	8	5	25
2	United States (USA)	8	8	9	25
3	Soviet Union (URS)	4	7	3	14
4	West Germany (FRG)	2	1	2	5
5	Canada (CAN)	1	2	1	4
6	Netherlands (NED)	1	1	2	4
7	Brazil (BRA)	1	0	0	1
8	Australia (AUS)	0	1	0	1
8	Great Britain (GBR)	0	1	0	1
8	Hungary (HUN)	0	1	0	1
11	Sweden (SWE)	0	0	3	3
12	Italy (ITA)	0	0	1	1
12	Romania (ROU)	0	0	1	1
12	Yugoslavia (YUG)	0	0	1	1
Totals (14 entries)		29	30	28	87
