= 100 metres freestyle =

Competitive swimming race

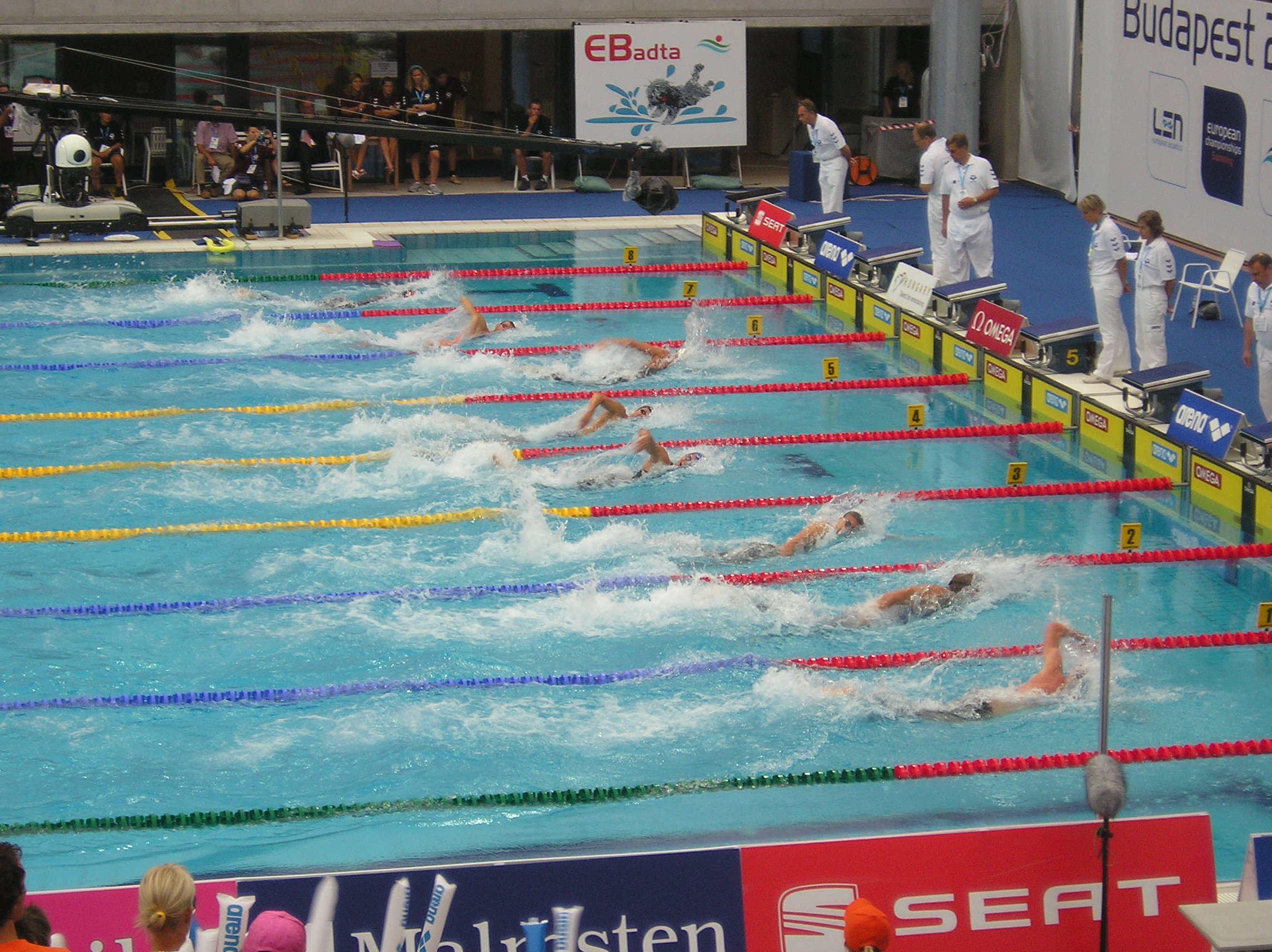
The switch to mid-race in a 100 m freestyle.

The 100 metres freestyle is often considered to be the highlight (Blue Ribbon event) of the sport of swimming, like 100 metres in the sport of athletics, symbolizing the pinnacle of speed and athleticism in swimming competitions.

The first swimmer to break the one-minute barrier (long course) was Johnny Weissmuller, in 1922. The current world record holders (long course) are China's Pan Zhanle (since 2024) and the Netherlands' Marrit Steenbergen (since 2026).

Australian Dawn Fraser won the event a record three times at the Olympics, and she is the only woman to win it more than once. Four men, American Duke Kahanamoku, Weissmuller, Russian Alexander Popov, and Dutchman Pieter van den Hoogenband won the event at the Olympics twice. Popov was also world champion (held since 1973) three times.

== All-time top 25 ==
Tables show data for two definitions of "Top 25" - the top 25 100 m freestyle times and the top 25 athletes:
- denotes top performance for athletes in the top 25 100 m freestyle times
- denotes lesser performances, still in the top 25 100 m freestyle times, by repeat athletes
- denotes top performance (only) for other top 25 athletes who fall outside the top 25 100 m freestyle times

=== Men long course ===
- Correct as of August 2026

Ath.#	Perf.#	Time	Athlete	Nation	Date	Place	Ref.
1	1	46.40	Pan Zhanle	China	31 July 2024	Paris	
2	2	46.51	David Popovici	Romania	31 July 2025	Singapore	
	3	46.56	Popovici #2		12 August 2026	Paris	
	4	46.71	Popovici #3		28 June 2025	Šamorín	
	5	46.72	Popovici #4		11 August 2026	Paris	
3	6	46.74	Egor Kornev	Russia	12 August 2026	Paris	
	7	46.80	Pan #2		11 February 2024	Doha	
4	8	46.81	Jack Alexy	United States	30 July 2025	Singapore	
	9	46.84	Popovici #5		30 July 2025	Singapore	
	10	46.86	Popovici #6		13 August 2022	Rome	
5	11	46.87	Kristóf Milák	Hungary	12 August 2026	Paris	
	12	46.88	Popovici #7		19 June 2024	Belgrade	
6	13	46.91	César Cielo	Brazil	30 July 2009	Rome	
	13	46.91	Alexy #2		2 August 2025	Singapore	
	15	46.92	Pan #3		27 July 2024	Paris	
	15	46.92	Alexy #3		31 July 2025	Singapore	
7	17	46.94	Alain Bernard	France	23 April 2009	Montpellier	
8	18	46.96	Caeleb Dressel	United States	25 July 2019	Gwangju	
	18	46.96	Kornev #2		11 June 2026	Kazan	
	20	46.97	Pan #4		24 September 2023	Hangzhou	
	20	46.97	Pan #5		23 April 2024	Shenzhen	
	22	46.98	Popovici #8		12 August 2022	Rome	
	23	46.99	Alexy #4		3 June 2025	Indianapolis	
	23	46.99	Kornev #3		10 June 2026	Kazan	
	25	47.02	Dressel #2		29 July 2021	Tokyo	
9		47.04	Cameron McEvoy	Australia	11 April 2016	Adelaide	
10		47.05	Eamon Sullivan	Australia	13 August 2008	Beijing	
11		47.08	Kyle Chalmers	Australia	25 July 2019	Gwangju	
11		47.08	Kyle Chalmers	Australia	29 July 2021	Tokyo	
12		47.09	Flynn Southam	Australia	24 July 2026	Glasgow	
13		47.10	James Magnussen	Australia	19 March 2012	Adelaide	
13		47.10	Guilherme Caribé	Brazil	23 April 2025	Rio de Janeiro	
15		47.11	Kliment Kolesnikov	Russia	28 July 2021	Tokyo	
16		47.15	Frédérick Bousquet	France	24 April 2009	Montpellier	
17		47.16	Chris Guiliano	United States	13 August 2026	Irvine	
18		47.26	Luca Hoek	Spain	11 August 2026	Paris	
19		47.27	Brent Hayden	Canada	30 July 2009	Rome	
20		47.33	David Walters	United States	30 July 2009	Rome	
20		47.33	Maxime Grousset	France	18 June 2024	Chartres	
22		47.37	Stefan Nystrand	Sweden	30 July 2009	Rome	
23		47.39	Ryan Held	United States	31 July 2019	Stanford	
23		47.39	Kim Youngbeom	South Korea	22 October 2025	Busan	
25		47.42	Jere Hribar	Croatia	12 August 2026	Paris	

=== Men short course ===
- Correct as of October 2026

Ath.#	Perf.#	Time	Athlete	Nation	Date	Place	Ref.
1	1	44.64	Jack Alexy	United States	30 October 2026	Westmont	
2	2	44.84	Kyle Chalmers	Australia	29 October 2021	Kazan	
2	2	44.84	Egor Kornev	Russia	2 October 2026	Baku	
4	4	44.94	Amaury Leveaux	France	13 December 2008	Rijeka	
5	5	44.95	Vladimir Morozov	Russia	16 November 2018	Singapore	
5	5	44.95	Jordan Crooks	Cayman Islands	11 December 2024	Budapest	
	7	44.99	Kornev #2		9 November 2025	Kazan	
	8	45.03	Chalmers #2		21 October 2021	Doha	
7	9	45.04	Florent Manaudou	France	5 December 2013	Dijon	
	10	45.05	Alexy #2		10 December 2024	Budapest	
8	11	45.08	Nathan Adrian	United States	19 December 2009	Manchester	
8	11	45.08	Caeleb Dressel	United States	22 November 2020	Budapest	
	13	45.09	Alexy #3		30 October 2026	Westmont	
10	14	45.11	Cameron McEvoy	Australia	15 October 2026	Astana	
	15	45.12	Leveaux #2		12 December 2008	Rijeka	
	16	45.16	Morozov #2		10 November 2018	Tokyo	
	16	45.16	Chalmers #3		15 December 2022	Melbourne	
11	18	45.17	Maxime Grousset	France	6 December 2025	Lublin	
11	18	45.17	Chris Guiliano	United States	30 October 2026	Westmont	
	20	45.18	Dressel #2		21 November 2020	Budapest	
	20	45.18	Kornev #3		19 December 2025	Saint Petersburg	
	22	45.20	Dressel #3		16 November 2020	Budapest	
	23	45.21	Kornev #4		8 November 2025	Kazan	
	24	45.22	Dressel #4		20 December 2019	Las Vegas	
	24	45.22	Crooks #2		11 December 2024	Budapest	
	24	45.22	Guiliano #2		30 October 2026	Westmont	
13		45.30	Joshua Liendo	Canada	24 October 2025	Toronto	
14		45.36	Evgeny Lagunov	Russia	11 December 2009	Istanbul	
15		45.46	Matthew Abood	Australia	21 November 2009	Singapore	
16		45.47	Guilherme Caribé	Brazil	12 December 2024	Budapest	
17		45.51	Alessandro Miressi	Italy	10 December 2023	Otopeni	
18		45.54	Stefan Nystrand	Sweden	10 November 2009	Stockholm	
19		45.56	Brent Hayden	Canada	14 November 2009	Berlin	
20		45.58	Kliment Kolesnikov	Russia	7 November 2021	Kazan	
21		45.60	James Magnussen	Australia	7 August 2013	Eindhoven	
22		45.61	Flynn Southam	Australia	30 September 2026	Sydney	
23		45.63	Ryan Held	United States	21 December 2021	Abu Dhabi	
24		45.64	David Popovici	Romania	15 December 2022	Melbourne	
24		45.64	Jere Hribar	Croatia	6 December 2025	Lublin	

=== Women long course ===
- Correct as of August 2026

Ath.#	Perf.#	Time	Athlete	Nation	Date	Place	Ref.
1	1	51.68	Marrit Steenbergen	Netherlands	27 June 2026	Rome	
2	2	51.69	Kate Douglass	United States	14 August 2026	Irvine	
3	3	51.71	Sarah Sjöström	Sweden	23 July 2017	Budapest	
	4	51.82	Steenbergen #2		4 July 2026	Eindhoven	
	5	51.86	Steenbergen #3		27 May 2026	Canet-en-Roussillon	
4	6	51.88	Anna Moesch	United States	28 July 2026	Irvine	
	7	51.90	Steenbergen #4		11 August 2026	Paris	
	8	51.93	Douglass #2		1 August 2026	Irvine	
	9	51.94	Moesch #2		25 May 2026	London	
5	10	51.96	Emma McKeon	Australia	30 July 2021	Tokyo	
	11	51.97	Steenbergen #5		30 May 2026	Barcelona	
6	12	52.02	Siobhán Haughey	Hong Kong	8 October 2023	Berlin	
7	13	52.03	Cate Campbell	Australia	10 August 2018	Tokyo	
8	14	52.04	Simone Manuel	United States	26 July 2019	Gwangju	
	15	52.06	C. Campbell #2		2 July 2016	Brisbane	
9	16	52.07	Britta Steffen	Germany	31 July 2009	Rome	
	17	52.08	Sjöström #2		18 June 2017	Canet-en-Roussillon	
10	17	52.08	Mollie O'Callaghan	Australia	23 July 2023	Fukuoka	
	19	52.11	Moesch #3		20 June 2026	Indianapolis	
	20	52.12	C. Campbell #3		13 June 2019	Brisbane	
	21	52.13	McKeon #2		28 July 2021	Tokyo	
	21	52.13	Steenbergen #6		24 May 2026	Monaco	
	23	52.16	O'Callaghan #2		28 July 2023	Fukuoka	
	23	52.16	Sjöström #3		31 July 2024	Paris	
	25	52.17	Haughey #2		26 September 2023	Hangzhou	
11		52.27	Bronte Campbell	Australia	9 April 2018	Gold Coast	
12		52.28	Shayna Jack	Australia	23 July 2023	Fukuoka	
13		52.29	Torri Huske	United States	31 July 2024	Paris	
14		52.48	Yang Junxuan	China	27 July 2024	Paris	
15		52.51	Meg Harris	Australia	14 August 2026	Irvine	
16		52.57	Gretchen Walsh	United States	13 August 2026	Irvine	
17		52.59	Mallory Comerford	United States	23 July 2017	Budapest	
17		52.59	Penny Oleksiak	Canada	30 July 2021	Tokyo	
19		52.62	Libby Trickett	Australia	26 July 2009	Rome	
20		52.69	Femke Heemskerk	Netherlands	5 April 2015	Eindhoven	
20		52.69	Pernille Blume	Denmark	28 July 2017	Budapest	
20		52.69	Sara Curtis	Italy	27 June 2026	Rome	
23		52.71	Milou van Wijk	Netherlands	11 August 2026	Paris	
24		52.72	Taylor Ruck	Canada	10 August 2018	Tokyo	
25		52.74	Charlotte Bonnet	France	26 May 2018	Saint-Raphaël	

=== Women short course ===
- Correct as of October 2026

Ath.#	Perf.#	Time	Athlete	Nation	Date	Place	Ref.
1	1	49.64	Kate Douglass	United States	31 October 2026	Westmont	
	2	49.93	Douglass #2		25 October 2025	Toronto	
	3	50.19	Douglass #3		19 October 2025	Westmont	
	4	50.20	Douglass #4		15 October 2026	Charlottesville	
2	5	50.25	Cate Campbell	Australia	26 October 2017	Adelaide	
3	6	50.31	Gretchen Walsh	United States	12 December 2024	Budapest	
4	7	50.32	Marrit Steenbergen	Netherlands	10 October 2026	Tashkent	
	7	50.32	Walsh #2		15 October 2026	Charlottesville	
	9	50.42	Steenbergen #2		6 December 2025	Lublin	
	10	50.49	Walsh #3		11 December 2024	Budapest	
	11	50.52	Steenbergen #3		17 October 2026	Astana	
5	12	50.58	Sarah Sjöström	Sweden	11 August 2017	Eindhoven	
5	12	50.58	Emma McKeon	Australia	9 October 2021	Budapest	
7	14	50.60	Béryl Gastaldello	France	6 December 2025	Lublin	
	15	50.61	Walsh #4		31 October 2026	Westmont	
	16	50.63	Gastaldello #2		12 December 2024	Budapest	
	17	50.67	McKeon #2		30 October 2021	Kazan	
	18	50.73	Douglass #5		12 December 2024	Budapest	
	19	50.77	Sjöström #2		3 August 2017	Moscow	
	19	50.77	McKeon #3		15 December 2022	Melbourne	
	21	50.78	Steenbergen #4		3 October 2026	Baku	
8	22	50.79	Siobhán Haughey	Hong Kong	4 December 2021	Eindhoven	
	23	50.82	Douglass #6		2 November 2024	Singapore	
9	23	50.82	Mollie O'Callaghan	Australia	25 October 2025	Toronto	
	25	50.83	Douglass #7		12 October 2025	Carmel	
10		50.94	Liberty Clark	United States	31 October 2026	Westmont	
11		50.95	Ranomi Kromowidjojo	Netherlands	15 December 2017	Copenhagen	
12		51.01	Libby Trickett	Australia	11 August 2009	Hobart	
13		51.19	Fran Halsall	Great Britain	22 November 2009	Singapore	
14		51.22	Rylee Erisman	United States	31 October 2026	Westmont	
15		51.26	Abbey Weitzeil	United States	10 November 2020	Budapest	
15		51.26	Sara Curtis	Italy	6 December 2025	Lublin	
17		51.29	Femke Heemskerk	Netherlands	17 November 2018	Singapore	
18		51.35	Inge Dekker	Netherlands	11 December 2009	Istanbul	
19		51.40	Madison Wilson	Australia	25 August 2022	Sydney	
20		51.43	Freya Anderson	Great Britain	31 October 2020	Budapest	
20		51.43	Freya Anderson	Great Britain	15 November 2020	Budapest	
20		51.43	Freya Anderson	Great Britain	21 November 2020	Budapest	
20		51.43	Freya Anderson	Great Britain	22 November 2020	Budapest	
21		51.44	Katarzyna Wasick	Poland	17 September 2021	Naples	
22		51.45	Kayla Sanchez	Canada	14 December 2018	Sheffield	
22		51.45	Marie Wattel	France	12 December 2019	Angers	
24		51.47	Michelle Coleman	Sweden	17 November 2019	Eskilstuna	
25		51.48	Eva Okaro	Great Britain	5 December 2025	Lublin	

== Olympic champions ==
=== Men ===
Edition	Winner	Time	Notes	Ref.
(Greece) Athens 1896	Alfréd Hajós (HUN)	1:22.2	OR	
1900	not included in the program			
1904	the event was held in yards, not metres			
(United Kingdom) London 1908	Charles Daniels (USA)	1:05.6	WR	
(Sweden) Stockholm 1912	Duke Kahanamoku (USA)	1:03.4	(Note: Duke Kahanamoku set an Olympic record of 1:02.4 in the semifinals.)	
(Belgium) Antwerp 1920	Duke Kahanamoku (USA)	1:01.4	WR	
(France) Paris 1924	Johnny Weissmuller (USA)	59.0	OR	
(Netherlands) Amsterdam 1928	Johnny Weissmuller (USA)	58.6	OR	
(United States) Los Angeles 1932	Yasuji Miyazaki (JPN)	58.2	(Note: Yasuji Miyazaki set an Olympic record of 58.0 in the semifinals.)	
(Nazi Germany) Berlin 1936	Ferenc Csik (HUN)	57.6	(Note: Masaharu Taguchi set an Olympic record of 57.5 in the heats, which was subsequently tied by Masanori Yusa in the semifinals.)	
(United Kingdom) London 1948	Wally Ris (USA)	57.3	OR	
(Finland) Helsinki 1952	Clarke Scholes (USA)	57.4	(Note: Clarke Scholes set an Olympic record of 57.1 in the semifinals.)	
(Australia) Melbourne 1956	Jon Henricks (AUS)	55.4	WR	
(Italy) Rome 1960	John Devitt (AUS)	55.2	OR	
(Japan) Tokyo 1964	Don Schollander (USA)	53.4	OR	
Mexico City 1968	Mike Wenden (AUS)	52.2	WR	
(West Germany) Munich 1972	Mark Spitz (USA)	51.22	WR	
(Canada) Montreal 1976	Jim Montgomery (USA)	49.99	WR	
(Soviet Union) Moscow 1980	Jörg Woithe (GDR)	50.40		
(United States) Los Angeles 1984	Rowdy Gaines (USA)	49.80	OR	
(South Korea) Seoul 1988	Matt Biondi (USA)	48.63	OR	
(Spain) Barcelona 1992	Alexander Popov (EUN)	49.02		
(United States) Atlanta 1996	Alexander Popov (RUS)	48.74		
(Australia) Sydney 2000	Pieter van den Hoogenband (NED)	48.30	(Note: Pieter van den Hoogenband set a world record of 47.84 in the semifinals.)	
(Greece) Athens 2004	Pieter van den Hoogenband (NED)	48.17		
(China) Beijing 2008	Alain Bernard (FRA)	47.21	(Note: Eamon Sullivan set a world record of 47.05 in the semifinals.)	
(United Kingdom) London 2012	Nathan Adrian (USA)	47.52		
(Brazil) Rio de Janeiro 2016	Kyle Chalmers (AUS)	47.58		
(Japan) Tokyo 2020	Caeleb Dressel (USA)	47.02	OR	
(France) Paris 2024	Pan Zhanle (CHN)	46.40	WR	

=== Women ===
Edition	Winner	Time	Notes	Ref.
(Sweden) Stockholm 1912	Fanny Durack (ANZ)	1:22.2	(Note: Fanny Durack set a world record of 1:19.8 in the quarterfinals.)	
(Belgium) Antwerp 1920	Ethelda Bleibtrey (USA)	1:13.6	WR	
(France) Paris 1924	Ethel Lackie (USA)	1:12.4	(Note: Mariechen Wehselau set a world record of 1:12.2 in the heats.)	
(Netherlands) Amsterdam 1928	Albina Osipowich (USA)	1:11.0	OR	
(United States) Los Angeles 1932	Helene Madison (USA)	1:06.8	OR	
(Nazi Germany) Berlin 1936	Rie Mastenbroek (NED)	1:05.9	OR	
(United Kingdom) London 1948	Greta Andersen (DEN)	1:06.3		
(Finland) Helsinki 1952	Katalin Szöke (HUN)	1:06.8	(Note: Judit Temes set an Olympic record of 1:05.5 in the heats.)	
(Australia) Melbourne 1956	Dawn Fraser (AUS)	1:02.0	WR	
(Italy) Rome 1960	Dawn Fraser (AUS)	1:01.2	OR	
(Japan) Tokyo 1964	Dawn Fraser (AUS)	59.5	OR	
Mexico City 1968	Jan Henne (USA)	1:00.0		
(West Germany) Munich 1972	Sandra Neilson (USA)	58.59	OR	
(Canada) Montreal 1976	Kornelia Ender (GDR)	55.65	WR	
(Soviet Union) Moscow 1980	Barbara Krause (GDR)	54.79	WR	
(United States) Los Angeles 1984	Nancy Hogshead (USA)	55.92		
(United States) Los Angeles 1984	Carrie Steinseifer (USA)	55.92		
(South Korea) Seoul 1988	Kristin Otto (GDR)	54.93		
(Spain) Barcelona 1992	Zhuang Yong (CHN)	54.65	OR	
(United States) Atlanta 1996	Le Jingyi (CHN)	54.50	OR	
(Australia) Sydney 2000	Inge de Bruijn (NED)	53.83	(Note: Inge de Bruijn set a world record of 53.77 in the semifinals.)	
(Greece) Athens 2004	Jodie Henry (AUS)	53.84	(Note: Jodie Henry set a world record of 53.52 in the semifinals.)	
(China) Beijing 2008	Britta Steffen (GER)	53.12	OR	
(United Kingdom) London 2012	Ranomi Kromowidjojo (NED)	53.00	OR	
(Brazil) Rio de Janeiro 2016	Simone Manuel (USA)	52.70	OR	
(Brazil) Rio de Janeiro 2016	Penny Oleksiak (CAN)	52.70	OR	
(Japan) Tokyo 2020	Emma McKeon (AUS)	51.96	OR	
(France) Paris 2024	Sarah Sjöström (SWE)	52.16		

== World champions (long course) ==
=== Men ===
Edition	Winner	Time	Notes	Ref.
(Socialist Federal Republic of Yugoslavia) Belgrade 1973	Jim Montgomery (USA)	51.70	CR	
(Colombia) Cali 1975	Andy Coan (USA)	51.25	CR	
(West Germany) Berlin 1978	David McCagg (USA)	50.24	CR	
(Ecuador) Guayaquil 1982	Jörg Woithe (GDR)	50.18	CR	
(Spain) Madrid 1986	Matt Biondi (USA)	48.94	CR	
(Australia) Perth 1991	Matt Biondi (USA)	49.18		
(Italy) Rome 1994	Alexander Popov (RUS)	49.12		
(Australia) Perth 1998	Alexander Popov (RUS)	48.93	CR	
(Japan) Fukuoka 2001	Anthony Ervin (USA)	48.33	CR	
(Spain) Barcelona 2003	Alexander Popov (RUS)	48.42		
(Canada) Montreal 2005	Filippo Magnini (ITA)	48.12	CR	
(Australia) Melbourne 2007	Filippo Magnini (ITA)	48.43		
(Australia) Melbourne 2007	Brent Hayden (CAN)	48.43		
(Italy) Rome 2009	César Cielo (BRA)	46.91	WR	
(China) Shanghai 2011	James Magnussen (AUS)	47.63		
(Spain) Barcelona 2013	James Magnussen (AUS)	47.71		
(Russia) Kazan 2015	Ning Zetao (CHN)	47.84		
(Hungary) Budapest 2017	Caeleb Dressel (USA)	47.17		
(South Korea) Gwanju 2019	Caeleb Dressel (USA)	46.96		
(Hungary) Budapest 2022	David Popovici (ROU)	47.58		
(Japan) Fukuoka 2023	Kyle Chalmers (AUS)	47.15		
(Qatar) Doha 2024	Pan Zhanle (CHN)	47.53		
Singapore 2025	David Popovici (ROU)	46.51	CR	

=== Women ===
Edition	Winner	Time	Notes	Ref.
(Socialist Federal Republic of Yugoslavia) Belgrade 1973	Kornelia Ender (GDR)	57.54	WR	
(Colombia) Cali 1975	Kornelia Ender (GDR)	56.50	CR	
(West Germany) Berlin 1978	Barbara Krause (GDR)	55.68	CR	
(Ecuador) Guayaquil 1982	Birgit Meineke (GDR)	55.79	(Note: Birgit Meineke set a championship record of 55.34 in the heats.)	
(Spain) Madrid 1986	Kristin Otto (GDR)	55.05	CR	
(Australia) Perth 1991	Nicole Haislett (USA)	55.17		
(Italy) Rome 1994	Le Jingyi (CHN)	54.01	WR	
(Australia) Perth 1998	Jenny Thompson (USA)	54.95		
(Japan) Fukuoka 2001	Inge de Bruijn (NED)	54.18		
(Spain) Barcelona 2003	Hanna-Maria Seppälä (FIN)	54.37		
(Canada) Montreal 2005	Jodie Henry (AUS)	54.18		
(Australia) Melbourne 2007	Libby Lenton (AUS)	53.40	=CR (Note: Natalie Coughlin set a championship record of 53.40 in the semifinals.)	
(Italy) Rome 2009	Britta Steffen (GER)	52.07	WR	
(China) Shanghai 2011	Aliaksandra Herasimenia (BLR)	53.45		
(China) Shanghai 2011	Jeanette Ottesen (DEN)	53.45		
(Spain) Barcelona 2013	Cate Campbell (AUS)	52.34		
(Russia) Kazan 2015	Bronte Campbell (AUS)	52.52		
(Hungary) Budapest 2017	Simone Manuel (USA)	52.27		
(South Korea) Gwanju 2019	Simone Manuel (USA)	52.04		
(Hungary) Budapest 2022	Mollie O'Callaghan (AUS)	52.67		
(Japan) Fukuoka 2023	Mollie O'Callaghan (AUS)	52.16		
(Qatar) Doha 2024	Marrit Steenbergen (NED)	52.26		
Singapore 2025	Marrit Steenbergen (NED)	52.55		

== World champions (short course) ==
=== Men ===
Edition	Winner	Time	Notes	Ref.
(Spain) Palma de Mallorca 1993	Fernando Scherer (BRA)	48.38	(Note: Jon Olsen set a championship record of 48.29 in the heats.)	
(Brazil) Rio de Janeiro 1995	Fernando Scherer (BRA)	47.97	(Note: Fernando Scherer set a championship record of 47.74 in the heats.)	
(Sweden) Gothenburg 1997	Francisco Sánchez (VEN)	47.86		
Hong Kong 1999	Lars Frölander (SWE)	47.05	CR	
(Greece) Athens 2000	Lars Frölander (SWE)	46.80	(Note: Lars Frölander set a championship record of 46.75 in the semifinals.)	
(Russia) Moscow 2002	Ashley Callus (AUS)	46.99		
(United States) Indianapolis 2004	Jason Lezak (USA)	47.97		
(China) Shanghai 2006	Ryk Neethling (RSA)	47.24		
(United Kingdom) Manchester 2008	Nathan Adrian (USA)	46.67	CR	
(United Arab Emirates) Dubai 2010	César Cielo (BRA)	45.74	CR	
(Turkey) Istanbul 2012	Vladimir Morozov (RUS)	45.65		
(Qatar) Doha 2014	César Cielo (BRA)	45.75		
(Canada) Windsor 2016	Simonas Bilis (LTU)	46.58		
(China) Hangzhou 2018	Caeleb Dressel (USA)	45.62		
(United Arab Emirates) Abu Dhabi 2021	Alessandro Miressi (ITA)	45.57		
(Australia) Melbourne 2022	Kyle Chalmers (AUS)	45.16	CR	
(Hungary) Budapest 2024	Jack Alexy (USA)	45.38	(Note: Jordan Crooks set a championship record of 44.95 in the heats.)	

=== Women ===
Edition	Winner	Time	Notes	Ref.
(Spain) Palma de Mallorca 1993	Le Jingyi (CHN)	53.01	WR	
(Brazil) Rio de Janeiro 1995	Le Jingyi (CHN)	53.23		
(Sweden) Gothenburg 1997	Jenny Thompson (USA)	53.46		
Hong Kong 1999	Jenny Thompson (USA)	53.24		
(Greece) Athens 2000	Therese Alshammar (SWE)	52.17	WR	
(Russia) Moscow 2002	Therese Alshammar (SWE)	52.89		
(United States) Indianapolis 2004	Libby Lenton (AUS)	52.67		
(China) Shanghai 2006	Libby Lenton (AUS)	52.33		
(United Kingdom) Manchester 2008	Marleen Veldhuis (NED)	52.17	=CR	
(United Arab Emirates) Dubai 2010	Ranomi Kromowidjojo (NED)	51.45	CR	
(Turkey) Istanbul 2012	Britta Steffen (GER)	52.31		
(Qatar) Doha 2014	Femke Heemskerk (NED)	51.37	CR	
(Canada) Windsor 2016	Brittany Elmslie (AUS)	51.81		
(China) Hangzhou 2018	Ranomi Kromowidjojo (NED)	51.14	CR	
(United Arab Emirates) Abu Dhabi 2021	Siobhán Haughey (HKG)	50.98	CR	
(Australia) Melbourne 2022	Emma McKeon (AUS)	50.77	CR	
(Hungary) Budapest 2024	Gretchen Walsh (USA)	50.31	CR	

== See also ==
- Freestyle swimming
- World record progression 100 metres freestyle
