= Sternal =

Sternal may refer to:

- Sternum, a long flat bone located in the central part of the chest
- Sternal (surname), a family name
