= Ute Geweniger =

East German swimmer

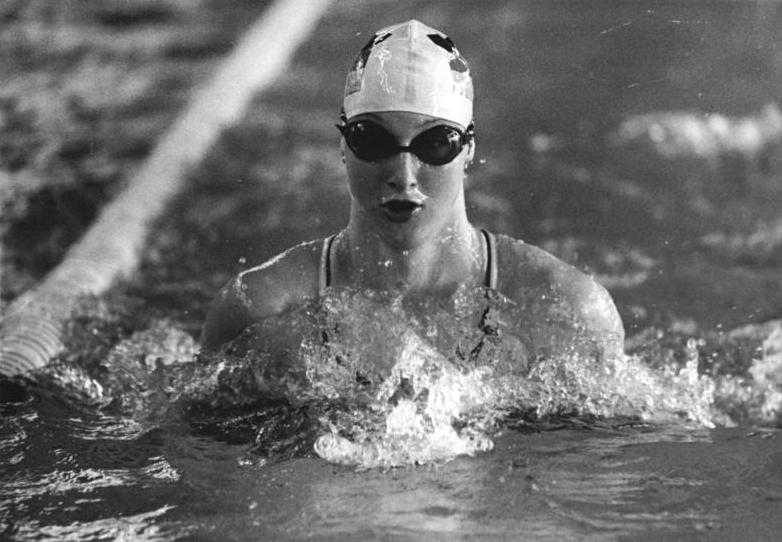
- Ute Geweniger in 1982

Personal information
- Nationality: East German
- Born: 24 February 1964 (age 62) Karl-Marx-Stadt, Sachsen, East Germany now Germany
- Height: 1.79 m (5 ft 10 1/2 in)
- Weight: 62 kg (137 lb)

Sport
- Sport: Swimming
- Strokes: Breaststroke
- Club: SC Karl-Marx-Stadt
Medal record
Women's swimming
Representing East Germany
Olympic Games
Gold medal – first place	1980 Moscow	100 m breaststroke
Gold medal – first place	1980 Moscow	4×100 m medley
World Championships (LC)
Gold medal – first place	1982 Guayaquil	100 m breaststroke
Gold medal – first place	1982 Guayaquil	4×100 m medley
Silver medal – second place	1982 Guayaquil	200 m individual medley
Silver medal – second place	1982 Guayaquil	200 m breaststroke
European Championships (LC)
Gold medal – first place	1981 Split	100 m breaststroke
Gold medal – first place	1981 Split	200 m breaststroke
Gold medal – first place	1981 Split	100 m butterfly
Gold medal – first place	1981 Split	200 m individual medley
Gold medal – first place	1981 Split	4×100 m medley
Gold medal – first place	1983 Rome	100 m breaststroke
Gold medal – first place	1983 Rome	200 m breaststroke
Gold medal – first place	1983 Rome	200 m individual medley
Gold medal – first place	1983 Rome	4×100 m medley
Silver medal – second place	1981 Split	400 m individual medley

Ute Geweniger (later Strauß, born 24 February 1964) is a former breaststroke and medley swimmer who was a leading member of the East German swimming team in the 1980s. She won two Olympic gold medals, in the 100 m breaststroke and 4×100 m medley relay at the 1980 Summer Olympics in Moscow, and set seven individual and two relay world records. She was named by Swimming World Magazine as World Swimmer of the Year in 1983 and as the European Swimmer of the Year in 1981 and 1983.

In 2005, she admitted that her performance had been supported by doping.

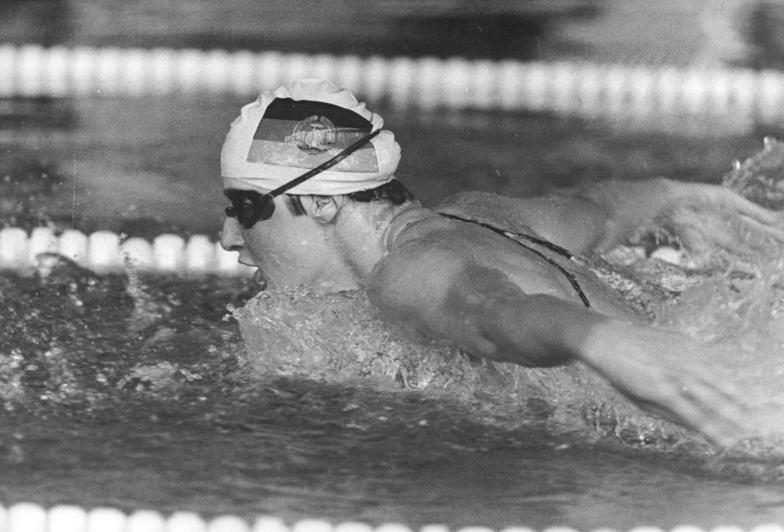
Ute Geweniger

Geweniger was born in Karl-Marx-Stadt, East Germany, and came to prominence when she set a world record in the 100 m breaststroke in qualifying for the East German team for the 1980 Summer Olympics in Moscow. There she captured gold, setting another world record in the process. She then combined with Rica Reinisch, Andrea Pollack and Caren Metschuck to claim gold in the medley relay, also in world record time. In 1981, she broke the 100 m breaststroke world record thrice, and the 200 m individual medley world record, prior to the European Championships in Split, Croatia, Yugoslavia. There she claimed gold in the 100 m and 200 m breaststroke (breaking a world record in the former), 200 m individual medley, medley relay, as well as a silver in the 400 m individual medley behind team-mate Petra Schneider. At the World Championships the following year in Guayaquil, Ecuador, she won gold in both the 100 m breaststroke and the medley relay, combining with Ines Geißler, Birgit Meineke and Kristin Otto to again lower the world record. At the 1983 European Championships in Rome, Italy, she again won the breaststroke double, the 200 m individual medley and the 4×100 m medley relay, setting a world record in the 100 m breaststroke. Geweniger was tipped for further Olympic success, but her career was ended when the Soviet bloc, including East Germany, staged a retaliatory boycott of the 1984 Summer Olympics held in Los Angeles.

== See also ==
- List of European Aquatics Championships medalists in swimming (women)

Records
Preceded by (East Germany) Petra Schneider	Women's 200 metre individual medley world record holder (long course); 4 July 1981 – 30 July 1992	Succeeded by (China) Lin Li
Awards
Preceded by (East Germany) Petra Schneider	European Swimmer of the Year; 1981	Succeeded by (East Germany) Cornelia Sirch
Preceded by (East Germany) Maxi Gnauck	East German Sportswoman of the Year; 1981	Succeeded by (East Germany) Marita Koch
Preceded by (East Germany) Petra Schneider	World Swimmer of the Year; 1983	Succeeded by (East Germany) Kristin Otto
Preceded by (East Germany) Cornelia Sirch	European Swimmer of the Year; 1983	Succeeded by (East Germany) Kristin Otto
