= 1982 World Aquatics Championships =

Aquatic sports competition

4th FINA World Championships
- Host city: Guayaquil, Ecuador
- Date(s): July 29–August 8, 1982

The 4th FINA World Aquatics Championships took place from July 29-August 8, 1982, in Guayaquil, Ecuador. They featured 848 athletes, competing in four Aquatics disciplines:

- Diving - 4 events (2 male, 2 female);
- Swimming - 29 events (15 male, 14 female);
- Synchronized Swimming - 3 events (all female); and
- Water Polo - 1 event (male).

== Medal table ==
Place	Nation	1st place, gold medalist(s)	2nd place, silver medalist(s)	3rd place, bronze medalist(s)	Total
1	United States	13	11	10	34
2	East Germany	12	9	5	26
3	Soviet Union	5	9	4	18
4	Canada	3	3	1	7
5	West Germany	2	1	3	6
6	Netherlands	1	1	2	4
7	Brazil	1	0	0	1
8	Hungary	0	2	0	2
9	Australia	0	1	0	1
9	Great Britain	0	1	0	1
11	Japan	0	0	3	3
11	Sweden	0	0	3	3
13	China	0	0	2	2
14	Italy	0	0	1	1
14	Romania	0	0	1	1
14	Yugoslavia	0	0	1	1
Total		37	38	36	111

== Results ==
=== Diving ===
Men

Event	Gold	Silver	Bronze
3 m springboard	Greg Louganis (USA)	Sergei Kuzmin (URS)	Aleksandr Portnov (URS)
10 m platform	Greg Louganis (USA)	Vladimir Aleynik (URS)	Bruce Kimball (USA)

Women

Event	Gold	Silver	Bronze
3 m springboard	Megan Neyer (USA)	Christina Seufert (USA)	Peng Yuanchun (CHN)
10 m platform	Wendy Wyland (USA)	Ramona Wenzel (GDR)	Zhou Jihong (CHN)

=== Swimming ===
Men

Event	Gold	Silver	Bronze
100 m freestyle	Jörg Woithe (GDR)	Rowdy Gaines (USA)	Per Johansson (SWE)
200 m freestyle	Michael Groß (FRG)	Rowdy Gaines (USA)	Jörg Woithe (GDR)
400 m freestyle	Vladimir Salnikov (URS)	Svyatoslav Semenov (URS)	Sven Lodziewski (GDR)
1500 m freestyle	Vladimir Salnikov (URS)	Svyatoslav Semenov (URS)	Darjan Petrič (YUG)
100 m backstroke	Dirk Richter (GDR)	Rick Carey (USA)	Vladimir Shemetov (URS)
200 m backstroke	Rick Carey (USA)	Sándor Wladár (HUN)	Frank Baltrusch (GDR)
100 m breaststroke	Steve Lundquist (USA)	Victor Davis (CAN)	John Moffet (USA)
200 m breaststroke	Victor Davis (CAN)	Robertas Žulpa (URS)	John Moffet (USA)
100 m butterfly	Matt Gribble (USA)	Michael Groß (FRG)	Bengt Baron (SWE)
200 m butterfly	Michael Groß (FRG)	Sergey Fesenko (URS)	Craig Beardsley (USA)
200 m individual medley	Aleksandr Sidorenko (URS)	Bill Barrett (USA)	Giovanni Franceschi (ITA)
400 m individual medley	Ricardo Prado (BRA)	Jens-Peter Berndt (GDR)	Sergey Fesenko (URS)
4 × 100 m freestyle relay	United States (USA); Chris Cavanaugh; Robin Leamy; David McCagg; Rowdy Gaines	Soviet Union (URS); Sergey Krasyuk; Aleksey Filonov; Sergey Smiriyagin; Aleksey Markovsky	Sweden (SWE); Per Johansson; Bengt Baron; Pelle Holmertz; Pelle Wikström
4 × 200 m freestyle relay	United States (USA); Richard Saeger; Jeff Float; Kyle Miller; Rowdy Gaines	Soviet Union (URS); Vladimir Shemetov; Ivar Stukolkin; Vladimir Salnikov; Aleksey Filonov	West Germany (FRG); Andreas Schmidt; Dirk Korthals; Rainer Henkel; Michael Groß
4 × 100 m medley relay	United States (USA); Rick Carey; Steve Lundquist; Matt Gribble; Rowdy Gaines	Soviet Union (URS); Vladimir Shemetov; Yuriy Kis; Aleksey Markovsky; Sergey Smiriyagin	West Germany (FRG); Stefan Peter; Gerald Mörken; Michael Groß; Andreas Schmidt

Women

Event	Gold	Silver	Bronze
100 m freestyle	Birgit Meineke (GDR)	Annemarie Verstappen (NED)	Jill Sterkel (USA)
200 m freestyle	Annemarie Verstappen (NED)	Birgit Meineke (GDR)	Annelies Maas (NED)
400 m freestyle	Carmela Schmidt (GDR)	Petra Schneider (GDR)	Tiffany Cohen (USA)
800 m freestyle	Kim Linehan (USA)	Jackie Wilmott (GBR)	Carmela Schmidt (GDR)
100 m backstroke	Kristin Otto (GDR)	Ina Kleber (GDR)	Susan Walsh (USA)
200 m backstroke	Cornelia Sirch (GDR)	Georgina Parkes (AUS)	Carmen Bunaciu (ROU)
100 m breaststroke	Ute Geweniger (GDR)	Anne Ottenbrite (CAN)	—
100 m breaststroke	Ute Geweniger (GDR)	Kim Rhodenbaugh (USA)	—
200 m breaststroke	Svetlana Varganova (URS)	Ute Geweniger (GDR)	Anne Ottenbrite (CAN)
100 m butterfly	Mary T. Meagher (USA)	Ines Geißler (GDR)	Melanie Buddemeyer (USA)
200 m butterfly	Ines Geißler (GDR)	Mary T. Meagher (USA)	Heike Dähne (GDR)
200 m individual medley	Petra Schneider (GDR)	Ute Geweniger (GDR)	Tracy Caulkins (USA)
400 m individual medley	Petra Schneider (GDR)	Kathleen Nord (GDR)	Tracy Caulkins (USA)
4 × 100 m freestyle relay	East Germany (GDR); Birgit Meineke; Susanne Link; Kristin Otto; Caren Metschuck	United States (USA); Susan Habernigg; Kathy Treible; Beth Washut; Jill Sterkel	Netherlands (NED); Annemarie Verstappen; Annelies Maas; Wilma van Velsen; Conny van Bentum
4 × 100 m medley relay	East Germany (GDR); Kristin Otto; Ute Geweniger; Ines Geißler; Birgit Meineke	United States (USA); Susan Walsh; Kim Rhodenbaugh; Mary T. Meagher; Jill Sterkel	Soviet Union (URS); Larisa Gorchakova; Svetlana Varganova; Natalya Pokas; Irina Gerasimova

=== Synchronised swimming ===
Event	Gold	Silver	Bronze
Solo routine	Tracie Ruiz (USA)	Kelly Kryczka (CAN)	Miwako Motoyoshi (JPN)
Duet routine	Sharon Hambrook (CAN); Kelly Kryczka (CAN)	Candy Costie (USA); Tracie Ruiz (USA)	Ikuko Abe (JPN); Masako Fujiwara (JPN)
Team routine	Canada (CAN)	United States (USA)	Japan (JPN)

=== Water polo ===
Men

Event	Gold	Silver	Bronze
Team	Soviet Union	Hungary	West Germany
