= Petar Georgiev (diver) =

Bulgarian diver (born 1961)

Personal information
- Nationality: Bulgarian
- Born: 7 March 1961 (age 65)

Sport
- Sport: Diving
Medal record
Men's diving
Representing Bulgaria
European Championships
Gold medal – first place	1983 Rome	3 m springboard
Silver medal – second place	1985 Sofia	3 m springboard

Petar Georgiev (Bulgarian: Петър Георгиев; born 7 March 1961) is a Bulgarian diver. He competed in two events at the 1980 Summer Olympics.
