= Kathy Treible =

American swimmer

Personal information
- Full name: Kathleen Treible Slaton
- Nickname: "Kathy"
- National team: United States
- Born: September 9, 1961 (age 64)

Sport
- Sport: Swimming
- Strokes: Breaststroke, freestyle
- College team: University of Florida
Medal record
Women's swimming
Representing the United States
World Championships
Silver medal – second place	1982 Guayaquil	4×100 m freestyle

Kathleen Treible Slaton (born September 9, 1961), née Kathleen Treible, is an American former competition swimmer who represented the United States in international events during the 1970s and early 1980s.

Treible studied at the Wisconsin Hills Junior High School and Brookfield Central High School in Brookfield, Wisconsin. She started swimming as an age group swimmer at the age of 9, and began competing internationally at 12 years old. As a 15-year-old, she placed fourth in the final of the women's 100-meter breaststroke at the 1978 World Aquatics Championships.

Treible accepted an athletic scholarship to attend the University of Florida in Gainesville, Florida, where she swam for coach Randy Reese's Florida Gators swimming and diving team in National Collegiate Athletic Association (NCAA) competition from 1981 to 1984. In four years as a Gator swimmer, she received twenty-eight All-American honors—the maximum number an individual college swimmer can earn. Treible was a key member of the 1982 Gators women's team that won the NCAA national team championship, winning three individual NCAA national titles in breaststroke events in 1982, for a total of six individual NCAA titles and five NCAA relay team titles during her career. She was recognized as the Southeastern Conference Female Swimmer of the Year in 1981 and 1982.

Treible won a silver medal as a member of the second-place U.S. team in the women's 4×100-meter freestyle relay at the 1982 World Aquatics Championships in Guayaquil, Ecuador. Individually, she also competed in the 100-meter freestyle at the 1982 world championships, and finished eighth in the final. At the 1983 Pan American Games in Caracas, Venezuela, she finished fourth in the 100-meter freestyle final.

She graduated from the University of Florida with a bachelor's degree in exercise and sport science in 1987, and was inducted into the University of Florida Athletic Hall of Fame as a "Gator Great" in 1995.

== See also ==
- List of University of Florida alumni
- List of University of Florida Athletic Hall of Fame members
- List of World Aquatics Championships medalists in swimming (women)
