= Raffaele Franceschi =

Italian swimmer (born 1960)

Personal information
- Born: 15 May 1960 (age 66) Milan, Italy
- Height: 1.90 m (6 ft 3 in)
- Weight: 79 kg (174 lb)
Medal record
Men's swimming
Representing Italy
European Championships
Bronze medal – third place	1983 Rome	4×200 m freestyle

Raffaele Franceschi (born 18 May 1960) is an Italian swimmer who won a bronze medal in the 4 × 200 m freestyle relay at the 1983 European Aquatics Championships. He also competed at the 1980 and 1984 Summer Olympics and finished fifth in the 100 m and 4 × 200 m freestyle events in 1980.

His brother, Giovanni Franceschi, is also a retired Olympic swimmer. In the 2000s, Raffaele was competing in the masters category.
