= Ramona Wenzel =

German diver (born 1963)

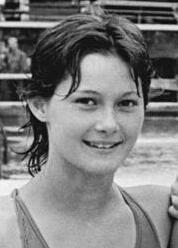
- Ramona Wenzel in 1981

Personal information
- Nationality: German
- Born: 25 January 1963 (age 63) Stralsund, East Germany

Sport
- Sport: Diving
Medal record
Women's diving
Representing East Germany
World Championships
Silver medal – second place	1982 Guayaquil	10 m platform
European Championships
Silver medal – second place	1985 Sofia	10 m platform
Bronze medal – third place	1983 Rome	10 m platform

Ramona Wenzel (born 25 January 1963) is a German diver. She competed in the women's 10 metre platform event at the 1980 Summer Olympics.
