= Per Holmertz =

Swedish swimmer (born 1960)

Personal information
- Full name: Per Anders Gustaf Holmertz
- Nationality: Swedish
- Born: 3 February 1960 (age 66) Motala, Östergötland
- Height: 1.85 m (6 ft 1 in)
- Weight: 75 kg (165 lb)
- Spouse: Lene Jenssen

Sport
- Sport: Swimming
- Strokes: Freestyle
- College team: University of California Berkeley
- Coach: Nort Thornton (U. Cal Berkeley)
Medal record
Men's swimming
Representing Sweden
Olympic Games
| Silver medal – second place | 1980 Moscow | 100 m freestyle |
World Championships (LC)
| Bronze medal – third place | 1978 Berlin | 4×100 m freestyle |
| Bronze medal – third place | 1982 Guayaquil | 4×100 m freestyle |
European Championships (LC)
| Silver medal – second place | 1981 Split | 4×100 m freestyle |
| Silver medal – second place | 1983 Rome | 4×100 m freestyle |

Per ("Pelle") Anders Gustaf Holmertz (born 3 February 1960 in Motala, Östergötland) is a former freestyle swimmer from Sweden and a 1980 Olympic silver medalist in the 100-meter freestyle.

== U Cal Berkeley swimming ==
At the University of California Berkeley, Holmertz was coached by Hall of Fame Coach Nort Thornton. At Cal, Holmertz won All-American honors four times. Swimming during an exceptional period in the team's history, Holmertz was highly instrumental in leading Cal to its first NCAA team championship in 1979, then contributed to another NCAA national title in the 1980 season. He swam on two NCAA teams that set relay records. His first NCAA win was with the 400 medley relay team in 1979 that set a combined time of 3:15:22. In 1982, he swam on the 800 free relay that set a record time of 6:28:94. In the same year he captured the 200 freestyle title at the NCAA Championships and won 100 freestyle title at the Pac-10 Conference championships.

Pelle is not related to accomplished swimmer Anders Holmertz, although they are both from the same town.

=== 1980 Olympics ===
He won a silver medal for Sweden in the 100 meter freestyle at the 1980 Summer Olympics with a time of 50.91, and was followed closely by Swedish team mate Per Johansson who took the bronze.

=== Honors ===
In 2006, Holmertz was inaugurated into the University of California at Berkeley's Sports Hall of Fame for his numerous wins and records for the school's swimteam in the early eighties. Holmertz graduated with a degree in economics from Cal in 1983.

== Personal bests ==
=== Long course (50 m) ===
| Event | Time | Date | Meet | Location | Ref |
|---|---|---|---|---|---|
| 50 m freestyle | 23.05 | 10 Apr 1980 | - | Austin, TX, United States | |
| 100 m freestyle | 50.66 | 17 Jul 1982 | - | Stockholm, Sweden | |

Legend: WR – World record; ER – European record; NR – Swedish record;
Records not set in finals: h – heat; sf – semifinal; r – relay 1st leg; rh – relay heat 1st leg; b – B final; † – en route to final mark; so – swim-off; tt – time trial

== Clubs ==
- Motala SS
- Stockholmspolisens IF

Sporting positions
| Preceded by Incumbent | Swedish National LC Champion; Men's 50 m freestyle 1983 | Succeeded by Bengt Baron |
