= Anke Sonnenbrodt =

German freestyle swimmer

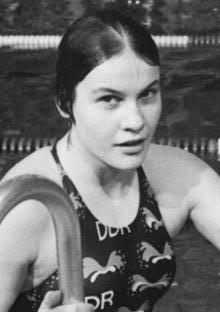

Medal record

Women's swimming

Representing East Germany

European Championships
Silver medal – second place	1983 Rome	400 m freestyle
Silver medal – second place	1983 Rome	800 m freestyle

Anke Sonnenbrodt is a German freestyle swimmer who won two silver medals at the 1983 European Aquatics Championships. The same year she set a European record in the 800 m freestyle. She missed the 1984 Summer Olympics in Los Angeles that were boycotted by East Germany, and instead competed at the Friendship Games, where she won a bronze medal in the 400 m freestyle.
