= Kim Rhodenbaugh =

American swimmer

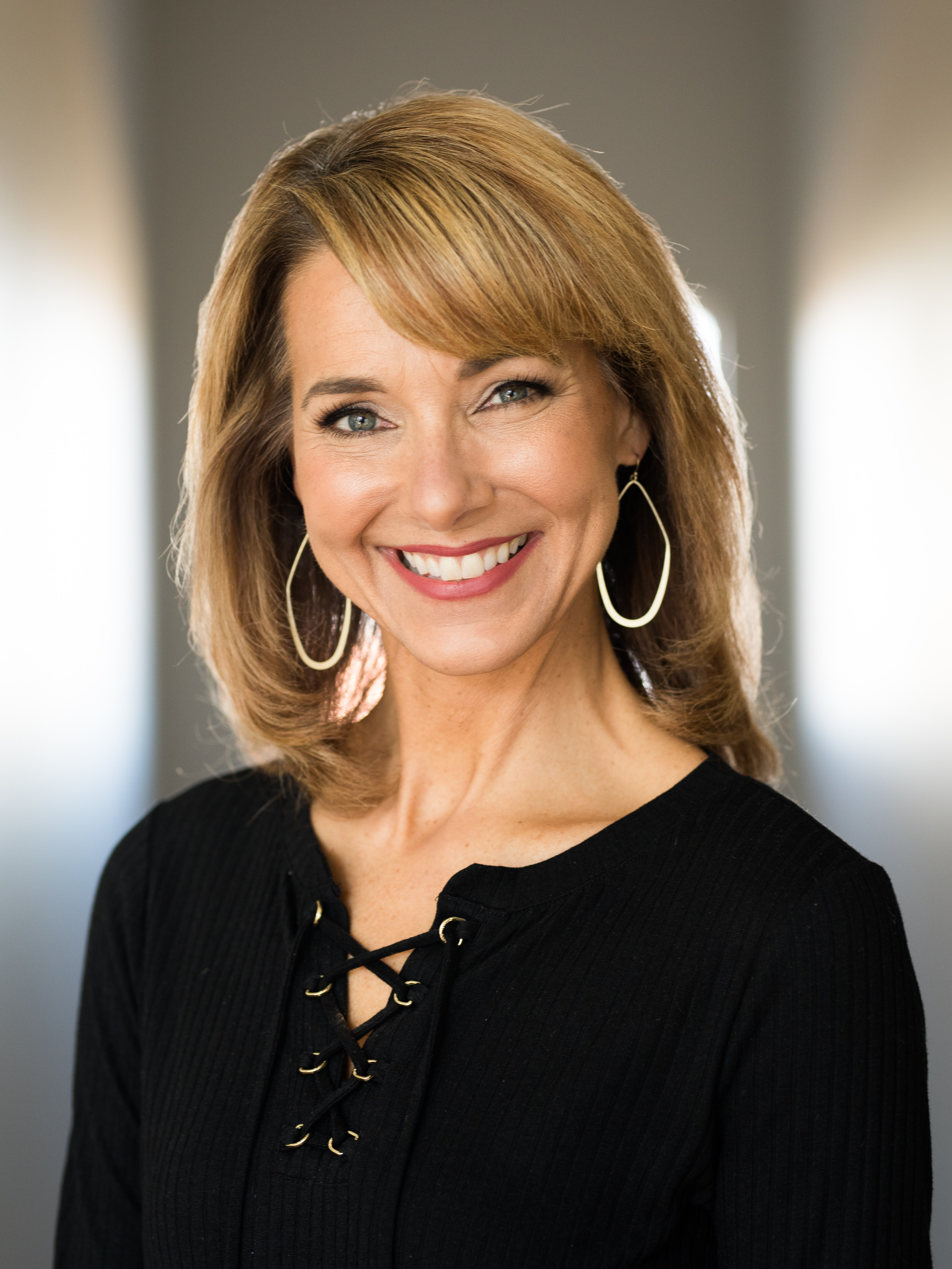
- Rhodenbaugh at 33 in late 1999

Personal information
- Full name: Kimberly Lynne Rhodenbaugh
- Nickname: "Kim"
- National team: United States
- Born: March 26, 1966 (age 60) Cincinnati, Ohio, U.S.
- Height: 5 ft 8 in (1.73 m)
- Weight: 132 lb (60 kg)
- Spouse: Nolan Lewallen
- Children: 7

Sport
- Sport: Swimming
- Strokes: Breaststroke
- Club: Cincinnati Pepsi Marlins
- College team: University of Texas
- Coach: Beth Richmond (Oak Hills High); Jay Fitzgerald (Cincinnati Marlins); Richard Quick (U. Texas)
Medal record
Women's swimming
Representing the United States
World Championships
Silver medal – second place	1982 Guayaquil	100 m breaststroke
Silver medal – second place	1982 Guayaquil	4x100 m medley
Pan American Games
Gold medal – first place	1983 Caracas	4×100 m medley
Bronze medal – third place	1983 Caracas	100 m breaststroke
Bronze medal – third place	1983 Caracas	200 m breaststroke
Summer Universiade
Gold medal – first place	1987 Zagreb	4x100 m medley

Kimberly Lynne Rhodenbaugh (born March 26, 1966), later known by her married name Kimberly Lewallen, is an American former competition swimmer who competed for the University of Texas Longhorns and represented the United States at the 1984 Summer Olympics in Los Angeles.

== Early life ==
Rhodenbaugh was born the seventh of eight children to Dr. Dillon Rhodenbaugh, an oral surgeon, and his wife Beverly on March 26, 1966, in Cincinnati Ohio. All seven of her siblings were successful swimming competitors who trained with the Cincinnati Marlins. Her brother Mark, who set national high school records, and swam for Southern Methodist University, later had a career as a swim coach in Dallas, Texas. Kim attended and swam for Oak Hills High School under Coach Beth Richmond, graduating in 1984. In club competition during her High School years, beginning at age 13 she greatly advanced her skills training with the Cincinnati Pepsi Marlins Club under ASCA Hall of Fame Coach Jay Fitzgerald.

At the 1982 Ohio High School State Championship, Rhodenbaugh set a National and State record in the 100-yard breaststroke with a time of 1:02.5, and also won the 200-yard Individual Medley. Her efforts led Oak Hills to tie for first at the State Meet that year. For her efforts, she received the Cincinnati Enquirer's High School Girls Swimmer of the Year Award.

== Breaststroke titles ==
A master of her stroke specialty, Rhodenbaugh was a US National Champion in breaststroke events five times during her High School years. Her championships included the 1981 100 breast Short Course title, the 1982 200 breast Short Course title, the 1982 100-meter breast Long Course title, the 1983 100-meter breast Long Course title and the 1983 200-meter breast Long Course title.

== 1984 Los Angeles Olympics ==
Rhodenbaugh competed in the women's 200-meter breaststroke, and finished eighth in the event final with a time of 2:35.51.

=== University of Texas ===
A 1989 graduate, Rhodenbaugh attended the University of Texas at Austin, where she swam for coach Richard Quick's Texas Longhorns swimming and diving team in National Collegiate Athletic Association (NCAA) competition. She won NCAA national championships in the women's 200-yard breaststroke (2:14.92) and 200-yard individual medley (2:01.93) in 1985. A highly accomplished team under Coach Quick, from 1985-1987 the Longhorn women swimmers had three consecutive team titles at the NCAA National Championships.

=== Honors ===
For her swimming achievements and community work, Rhodenbaugh was inducted into the University of Texas Longhorns Hall of Honor in 2018. She is a member of the Cincinnati Marlins Alumni Hall of Fame, and the 2004 Class of the Oak Hills High School Athletics Hall of Fame.

== Life after competition swimming ==
Rhodenbaugh continued to stay active in swimming for nearly 30 years as a coach and an instructor.

She is a motivational speaker, author of Master of the Mask, and founder of the non-profit organization Freedom Today, focusing on bringing hope and encouragement to sexual assault victims.

In 2016, Rhodenbaugh married Nolan Lewallen, a retiring American Airlines pilot, and together they have seven children and six grandchildren.

== See also ==
- List of University of Texas at Austin alumni
- List of World Aquatics Championships medalists in swimming (women)
