= 1983 European Aquatics Championships =

Water sport competitions

16th European Aquatics Championships
- Host city: Rome, Italy
- Date: 22–27 August 1983
- Venue: Stadio Olimpico del Nuoto
- Events: 38

The 1983 LEN European Aquatics Championships took place at the Stadio Olimpico del Nuoto in Rome, Italy, between 22 August and 27 August 1983. East Germany won all women's events in the swimming competition, and also every silver medal available to them in individual events. Besides swimming there were titles contested in diving, synchronized swimming and water polo (men). The 4 × 200 m freestyle relay for women was held for the first time.

== Medal table ==
* Host nation (Italy)

Rank	Nation	Gold	Silver	Bronze	Total
1	East Germany	17	17	5	39
2	Soviet Union	9	6	8	23
3	West Germany	4	3	8	15
4	Great Britain	4	1	2	7
5	Italy*	2	0	3	5
6	Sweden	1	1	0	2
7	Bulgaria	1	0	1	2
8	Netherlands	0	3	6	9
9	Hungary	0	3	0	3
10	Yugoslavia	0	2	1	3
11	Spain	0	1	1	2
12	France	0	1	0	1
13	Czechoslovakia	0	0	2	2
14	Romania	0	0	1	1
Totals (14 entries)		38	38	38	114

== Swimming ==
=== Men's events ===
Event	Gold		Silver		Bronze	
100 m freestyle	Per Johansson (SWE)	50.20	Jörg Woithe (GDR)	50.29	Sergey Smiriagin (URS)	50.35
200 m freestyle	Michael Groß (FRG)	1:47.87 WR	Jörg Woithe (GDR)	1:50.18	Thomas Fahrner (FRG)	1:50.92
400 m freestyle	Vladimir Salnikov (URS)	3:49.80	Borut Petrič (YUG)	3:51.96	Darjan Petrič (YUG)	3:52.60
1500 m freestyle	Vladimir Salnikov (URS)	15:08.84	Borut Petrič (YUG)	15:14.54	Stefan Pfeiffer (FRG)	15:16.85
100 m backstroke	Dirk Richter (GDR)	56.10	Vladimir Shemetov (URS)	56.38	Sergei Zabolotnov (URS)	56.95
200 m backstroke	Sergei Zabolotnov (URS)	2:01.00	Sándor Wladár (HUN)	2:01.61	Frank Baltrusch (GDR)	2:02.46
100 m breaststroke	Robertas Žulpa (URS)	1:03.32	Adrian Moorhouse (GBR)	1:03.37	Gerald Mörken (FRG)	1:04.16
200 m breaststroke	Adrian Moorhouse (GBR)	2:17.49	Albán Vermes (HUN)	2:18.27	Robertas Žulpa (URS)	2:18.72
100 m butterfly	Michael Groß (FRG)	54.00 ER =	David López-Zubero (ESP)	54.77	Aleksey Markovsky (URS)	54.81
200 m butterfly	Michael Groß (FRG)	1:57.05 WR	Sergey Fesenko (URS)	1:59.74	Paolo Revelli (ITA)	1:59.84
200 m individual medley	Giovanni Franceschi (ITA)	2:02.48 ER	Jens-Peter Berndt (GDR)	2:02.95	Josef Hladký (TCH)	2:03.55
400 m individual medley	Giovanni Franceschi (ITA)	4:20.41 ER	Jens-Peter Berndt (GDR)	4:20.81	Josef Hladký (TCH)	4:23.52
4 × 100 m freestyle relay	Soviet Union (URS); Sergey Smiriagin; Sergey Krasyuk; Volodymyr Tkachenko; Aleksey Markovsky	3:20.89 ER	Sweden (SWE); Thomas Lejdström; Per Johansson; Per Holmertz; Per Wikström	3:22.02	East Germany (GDR); Jörg Woithe; Dirk Richter; Rainer Sternal; Sven Lodziewski	3:23.02
4 × 200 m freestyle relay	West Germany (FRG); Thomas Fahrner; Alexander Schowtka; Andreas Schmidt; Michael Groß	7:20.40 WR	East Germany (GDR); Dirk Richter; Jörg Woithe; Rainer Sternal; Sven Lodziewski	7:23.01	Italy (ITA); Paolo Revelli; Marcello Guarducci; Raffaelle Franceschi; Fabrizio Rampazzo	7:26.01
4 × 100 m medley relay	Soviet Union (URS); Vladimir Shemetov; Robertas Žulpa; Aleksey Markovsky; Sergey Smiriagin	3:43.99	West Germany (FRG); Stefan Peter; Gerald Mörken; Michael Groß; Andreas Schmidt	3:44.79	East Germany (GDR); Dirk Richter; Sigurd Hanke; Andreas Ott; Jörg Woithe	3:45.54

=== Women's events ===
Event	Gold		Silver		Bronze	
100 m freestyle	Birgit Meineke (GDR)	55.18	Kristin Otto (GDR)	55.52	Conny van Bentum (NED)	56.61
200 m freestyle	Birgit Meineke (GDR)	1:59.45	Astrid Strauss (GDR)	2:00.16	Conny van Bentum (NED)	2:00.61
400 m freestyle	Astrid Strauss (GDR)	4:08.07 ER	Anke Sonnenbrodt (GDR)	4:10.37	Irina Laricheva (URS)	4:12.90
800 m freestyle	Astrid Strauss (GDR)	8:32.12	Anke Sonnenbrodt (GDR)	8:37.72	Sarah Hardcastle (GBR)	8:40.44
100 m backstroke	Ina Kleber (GDR)	1:01.79	Cornelia Sirch (GDR)	1:02.46	Carmen Bunaciu (ROU)	1:03.08
200 m backstroke	Cornelia Sirch (GDR)	2:12.05	Katrin Zimmermann (GDR)	2:13.36	Larisa Gortschakova (URS)	2:14.41
100 m breaststroke	Ute Geweniger (GDR)	1:08.51 WR	Sylvia Gerasch (GDR)	1:09.62	Tanya Bogomilova (BUL)	1:10.77
200 m breaststroke	Ute Geweniger (GDR)	2:30.64	Sylvia Gerasch (GDR)	2:30.67	Olga Zelenkova (URS)	2:33.10
100 m butterfly	Ines Geißler (GDR)	1:00.31	Cornelia Polit (GDR)	1:00.92	Cinzia Savi Scarponi (ITA)	1:01.37
200 m butterfly	Cornelia Polit (GDR)	2:07.82 ER	Ines Geißler (GDR)	2:08.09	Conny van Bentum (NED)	2:12.87
200 m individual medley	Ute Geweniger (GDR)	2:13.07	Kathleen Nord (GDR)	2:15.55	Irina Gerassimova (URS)	2:16.72
400 m individual medley	Kathleen Nord (GDR)	4:39.95	Petra Schneider (GDR)	4:40.34	Petra Zindler (FRG)	4:47.90
4 × 100 m freestyle relay	East Germany (GDR); Kristin Otto; Susanne Link; Cornelia Sirch; Birgit Meineke	3:44.72	Netherlands (NED); Annemarie Verstappen; Wilma van Velsen; Elles Voskes; Conny van Bentum	3:48.24	West Germany (FRG); Karin Seick; Susanne Schuster; Iris Zscherpe; Ina Beyermann	3:49.86
4 × 200 m freestyle relay	East Germany (GDR); Kristin Otto; Astrid Strauss; Cornelia Sirch; Birgit Meineke	8:02.27 WR	West Germany (FRG); Jutta Kalweit; Birgit Kowalczyk; Petra Zindler; Ina Beyermann	8:11.69	Netherlands (NED); Annemarie Verstappen; Jolande van der Meer; Reggie de Jong; Conny van Bentum	8:12.41
4 × 100 m medley relay	East Germany (GDR); Ina Kleber; Ute Geweniger; Ines Geißler; Birgit Meineke	4:05.79 WR	Netherlands (NED); Jolanda de Rover; Petra van Staveren; Annemarie Verstappen; Conny van Bentum	4:12.78	West Germany (FRG); Svenja Schlicht; Ute Hasse; Ina Beyermann; Karin Seick	4:13.25

== Diving ==
=== Men's events ===
Event	Gold		Silver		Bronze	
3 m springboard	Petar Georgiev (BUL)	619.80	Nikolay Drozhin (URS)	618.87	Chris Snode (GBR)	610.17
10 m platform	David Ambartsumyan (URS)	605.79	Vyacheslav Troshin (URS)	563.31	Steffen Haage (GDR)	559.41

=== Women's events ===
Event	Gold		Silver		Bronze	
3 m springboard	Brita Baldus (GDR)	494.88	Tatyana Alyabyeva (URS)	493.14	Daphne Jongejans (NED)	461.10
10 m platform	Alla Lobankina (URS)	455.52	Anzhela Stasyulevich (URS)	448.56	Ramona Wenzel (GDR)	410.91

== Synchronized swimming ==
Event	Gold		Silver		Bronze	
Solo	Carolyn Wilson (GBR)	180.333	Muriel Hermine (FRA)	172.767	Gudrun Hänisch (FRG)	172.600
Duet	Amanda Dodd (GBR); Carolyn Wilson (GBR)	174.667	Gudrun Hänisch (FRG); Gerlind Scheller (FRG)	168.634	Catrien Eijken (NED); Marijke Engelen (NED)	168.600
Team competition	Great Britain (GBR); Alison Bowler; Amanda Dodd; Allison Garratt; Caroline Holmyard; Helen Page; Nicola Shearn; Philippa Sutton; Carolyn Wilson	168.342	Netherlands (NED); Catrien Eijken; Marijke Engelen; Petri Engels; Marjolein Philipsen; Margo Siedel; Esther Theisen; Judith van de Berg; Annette van Tol	163.577	West Germany (FRG); Gudrun Hänisch; Kirsten Hohlstein; Silke Hohlstein; Anette Feil; Kerstin Jorkisch; Christine Lang; Gerlind Scheller; Annette Schubert	159.381

== Water polo ==
=== Men's event ===
Event	Gold	Silver	Bronze
Team competition	Soviet Union	Hungary	Spain
