= Sternal (surname) =

Sternal is a surname. Notable people with the surname include:

- Enzo Sternal (born 2007), French footballer
- Rainer Sternal (fl. 1980s), German swimmer
