= Borut Petrič =

Yugoslav swimmer (born 1961)

Personal information
- Born: 28 December 1961 (age 64) Kranj, Slovenia, Yugoslavia
Medal record
Men's swimming
Representing Yugoslavia
World Championships (LC)
Silver medal – second place	1978 Berlin	1500 m freestyle
European Championships (LC)
Gold medal – first place	1981 Split	400 m freestyle
Silver medal – second place	1981 Split	1500 m freestyle
Silver medal – second place	1983 Rome	400 m freestyle
Silver medal – second place	1983 Rome	1500 m freestyle
Bronze medal – third place	1977 Jönköping	1500 m freestyle
Mediterranean Games
Gold medal – first place	1979 Split	400 m freestyle
Gold medal – first place	1979 Split	400 m medley
Gold medal – first place	1979 Split	1500 m freestyle
Gold medal – first place	1983 Casablanca	200 m freestyle
Silver medal – second place	1979 Split	200 m freestyle
Silver medal – second place	1979 Split	200 m butterfly

Borut Petrič (born 28 December 1961 in Kranj, Slovenia) is a former Yugoslav freestyle swimmer, who represented Yugoslavia in three consecutive Summer Olympics, starting in 1976. A brother of swimmer Darjan Petrič, he won the silver medal in the men's 1500 m freestyle at the 1978 World Aquatics Championships in Berlin. Petrič was the youngest participant (14 years, 325 days) at the 1976 Summer Olympics in Montreal, Quebec, Canada. He also won a gold medal on 400 m freestyle in 1981. In the same year, Petrič received the Golden Badge award for best athlete of Yugoslavia. He is the coach at swimming club Fužinar Ravne.

Awards
Preceded by Slobodan Kačar	(Socialist Federal Republic of Yugoslavia) The Best Athlete of Yugoslavia; 1981	Succeeded by Dragan Kićanović
Preceded by Slobodan Kačar	Yugoslav Sportsman of the Year; 1981	Succeeded by Bojan Križaj
