= Alexey Karpov (coach) =

Russian swimming coach

Alexey Petrovich Karpov
- Born: July 30, 1952 (age 73)
- Occupations: Swimming coach in Dubai, UAE
- Awards: Honored Coach of Russia

Alexey Petrovich Karpov (Russian: Алексей Петрович Карпов; born July 30, 1952) is a Soviet - Russian swimming coach, Honored Coach of Russia, coach of the Russian swimming national team since 1978.

== Biography ==
Alexey Petrovich Karpov is an Honored Coach of Russia, and has worked as a swimming coach since 1978. Throughout his career, he has made a significant contribution to the development of sports swimming in Russia, training many high-level athletes.

Karpov has many years of experience working with the Russian national swimming team. He also headed the youth national swimming team for several years.

Currently, Alexey Petrovich works as a coach at a swimming club in Dubai, UAE, continuing to apply his knowledge and experience to train new generations of swimmers.

Alexey Karpov is recognized by the All-Russian Swimming Federation as one of the leading swimming coaches in Russia. His methods and approaches to the training process are highly valued in the professional community.

== Best students ==
Vladimir Shemetov - Honored Master of Sports, silver medalist at the Olympic Games, multiple medalist at the World Championships, two-time champion of the European Championships, multiple champion of the USSR.
