= Andreas Schmidt (swimmer) =

German swimmer

Personal information
- Full name: Andreas Schmidt
- Nationality: West German
- Born: September 22, 1959 (age 66) Düsseldorf, West Germany
- Height: 1.92 m (6 ft 4 in)
- Weight: 85 kg (187 lb)

Sport
- Sport: Swimming
- Strokes: Freestyle
- Club: FS Düsseldorf, Düsseldorf (GER) / SSF Bonn 1905, Bonn (GER)
Medal record
Men's swimming
Representing West Germany
World Championships (LC)
Silver medal – second place	1978 West Berlin	4×100 m freestyle
Silver medal – second place	1978 West Berlin	4×100 m medley
Bronze medal – third place	1978 West Berlin	4x200 m freestyle
Bronze medal – third place	1982 Guayaquil	4×200 m freestyle
Bronze medal – third place	1982 Guayaquil	4×100 m medley
European Championships (LC)
Gold medal – first place	1977 Jönköping	4x100 m freestyle
Gold medal – first place	1983 Rome	4x200 m freestyle
Silver medal – second place	1981 Split	4x200 m freestyle
Silver medal – second place	1983 Rome	4x100 m medley
Bronze medal – third place	1981 Split	4x100 m medley
Summer Universiade
Bronze medal – third place	1983 Edmonton	100 m freestyle

Andreas Schmidt (born 22 September 1959) is a German former swimmer who competed in the 1976 Summer Olympics and in the 1984 Summer Olympics.
