= David McCagg =

American swimmer (born 1958)

Personal information
- Full name: David Palmer McCagg
- National team: United States
- Born: March 13, 1958 (age 68) Fort Myers Beach, Florida, U.S.

Sport
- Sport: Swimming
- Strokes: Freestyle
- College team: Auburn University
Medal record
Men's swimming
Representing the United States
World Championships (LC)
Gold medal – first place	1978 Berlin	100 m freestyle
Gold medal – first place	1978 Berlin	4×100 m freestyle relay
Gold medal – first place	1978 Berlin	4×100 m medley relay
Gold medal – first place	1982 Guayaquil	4×100 m freestyle relay
Pan American Games
Gold medal – first place	1979 San Juan	100 m freestyle
Gold medal – first place	1979 San Juan	4×100 m freestyle relay
Gold medal – first place	1979 San Juan	4×100 m medley relay

David Palmer McCagg (born March 13, 1958) is an American former competition swimmer, world champion, and world record-holder. He was the 100 metres freestyle champion at the 1978 World Aquatics Championships in West Berlin.

== Early life ==
McCagg graduated from Cypress Lake High School in 1976. He was a student at Auburn University, where he swam for the Auburn Tigers swimming and diving team.

== Swimming career ==
He won four gold medals at the 1978 and 1982 world championships, and another three gold medals at the 1979 Pan American Games.

== After swimming ==
McCagg currently resides in Florida. He runs a company that develops devices to assist swimmers.

== See also ==
- List of Auburn University people
- List of World Aquatics Championships medalists in swimming (men)
- World record progression 4 × 100 metres freestyle relay
