= Petra Schneider =

German swimmer

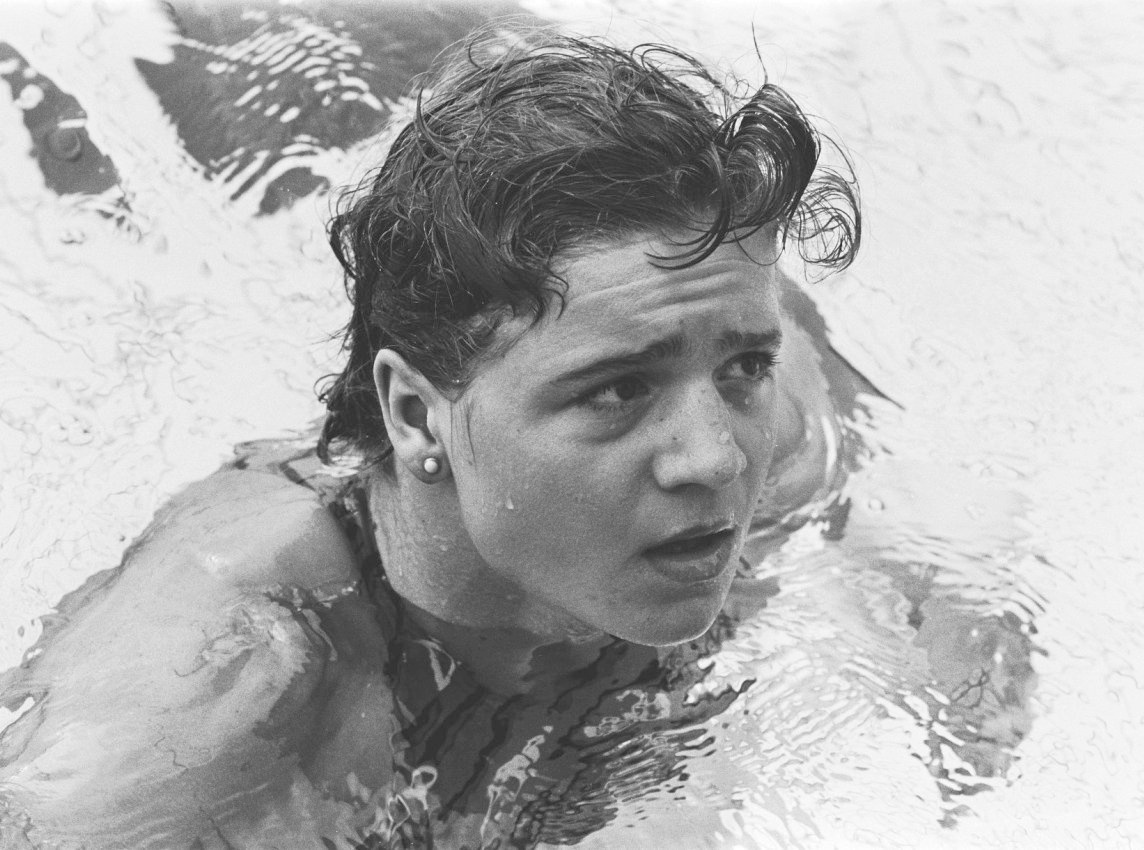
- Schneider in 1979

Personal information
- Born: 11 January 1963 (age 63) Karl-Marx-Stadt, East Germany (now Chemnitz, Saxony, Germany)
- Height: 1.72 m (5 ft 8 in)
- Weight: 60 kg (132 lb)

Sport
- Sport: Swimming
- Strokes: Medley; Freestyle
- Club: SC Karl-Marx-Stadt
Medal record
Women's swimming
Representing East Germany
Olympic Games
Gold medal – first place	1980 Moscow	400 m medley
Silver medal – second place	1980 Moscow	400 m freestyle
World Championships
Gold medal – first place	1982 Guayaquil	200 m medley
Gold medal – first place	1982 Guayaquil	400 m medley
Silver medal – second place	1982 Guayaquil	400 m freestyle
Bronze medal – third place	1978 Berlin	400 m medley
European Championships
Gold medal – first place	1981 Split	400 m indiv. medley
Silver medal – second place	1981 Split	200 m medley
Silver medal – second place	1983 Rome	400 m medley

Petra Schneider (born 11 January 1963) is a German retired medley and freestyle swimmer. She actively competed in the 1970s and 1980s.

She won an Olympic gold medal in the 400 m individual medley at the 1980 Summer Olympics in Moscow, and set five world records in swimming. She was named by Swimming World magazine as World Swimmer of the Year in 1980 and 1982, but her achievements are regarded with suspicion due to the state-run systematic doping program run by East Germany. She later admitted to having been doped.

In 2005, she called for her last remaining record (German national record in the 400 m individual medley) to be struck from the record books, because it was achieved with the aid of steroids.

Schneider came to prominence at the 1978 World Championships in Berlin, winning bronze in the 400 m individual medley behind arch-rival Tracy Caulkins of the United States with whom she shares the same birthday. Thereafter, she never lost to Caulkins again, repeatedly lowering Caulkins' world record in the event, three times in 1980 from 4:40.83 to 4:36.29 at the Moscow Olympics, which was boycotted by the United States. She improved her record to 4:36.10 at Guayaquil in 1982 and it was not bettered until 1997.

Schneider's victory in the 400 m event left silver medallist Sharron Davies of the United Kingdom 10 seconds in arrears. This particular victory, however, has been proven to be fraudulent as Schneider later admitted to doping as part of the Stasi era's drugs program wherein many female athletes were put on testosterone to enhance their outcome.

She also held the world record in the 200 m individual medley, but was denied a gold medal as the event was canceled for the 1980 games. She also collected a silver medal in the 400 m freestyle.

She repeated her haul at the 1982 World Championships in Ecuador, winning the medley double and a silver in the 400 m freestyle. She also won three European Championships medals and set eight European records. She was also named by Swimming World as the European Swimmer of the Year in 1979 and 1980. However, her Olympic career was ended when the Soviet bloc, including East Germany, staged a retaliatory boycott of the 1984 Summer Olympics held in Los Angeles.

== See also ==
- List of members of the International Swimming Hall of Fame
- List of German records in swimming

Records
Preceded by Tracy Caulkins	Women's 200 metre individual medley world record holder (long course); 24 May 1980 – 4 July 1981	Succeeded by Ute Geweniger
Preceded by Tracy Caulkins	Women's 400 metre individual medley world record holder (long course); 30 March 1980 – 13 October 1997	Succeeded by Chen Yan
Preceded by Incumbent	Women's 1500 metre freestyle world record holder (short course); 12 January 1982 – 20 November 2004	Succeeded by Laure Manaudou
Awards
Preceded by Incumbent	World Swimmer of the Year; 1980	Succeeded by Mary T. Meagher
Preceded by Mary T. Meagher	World Swimmer of the Year; 1982	Succeeded by Ute Geweniger
Preceded by Incumbent	European Swimmer of the Year; 1980	Succeeded by Ute Geweniger
