= Alexey Filonov =

Russian swimmer

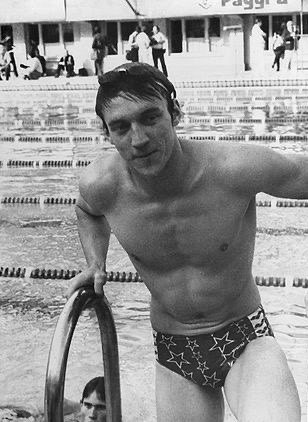

Personal information
- Born: 1961 (age 64–65)

Sport
- Sport: Swimming
Medal record
Representing Soviet Union
World Championships
| Silver medal – second place | 1982 Guayaquil | 4×100 m freestyle |
| Silver medal – second place | 1982 Guayaquil | 4×200 m freestyle |
Universiade
| Gold medal – first place | 1983 Edmonton | 4×200 m freestyle |
| Silver medal – second place | 1981 Bucharest | 4×100 m freestyle |
| Silver medal – second place | 1983 Edmonton | 200 m freestyle |

Aleksey Yuryevich Filonov (Russian: Алексей Юрьевич Филонов; born 1961) is a Russian swimmer who won silver medals in the 4×100 m and 4×200 m freestyle relays at the 1982 World Aquatics Championships. He also won three medals at the Summer Universiades of 1981 and 1983.

After retirement he won multiple medals in the masters category:

- World championships 2004: 1 gold (100 m butterfly) and 2 silver (100 m freestyle and 50 m butterfly)
- European championships: 7 gold, 4 silver, 2 bronze (2003, 2007, 2011)
- Soviet championships 1991: 2 gold
- Russian championships: 14 gold, 33 records (1998–2011)

He is the president of the Moscow Swimming Federation.
