= Gerald Mörken =

West German Olympic swimmer

Personal information
- Born: November 2, 1959 (age 66) Dortmund, West Germany

Sport
- Sport: Swimming
Medal record
Representing West Germany
World Championships
Bronze medal – third place	1978 West Berlin	100m breaststroke
Bronze medal – third place	1982 Guayaquil	4x100m medley relay
European Championships
Gold medal – first place	1977 Jönköping	100m breaststroke
Gold medal – first place	1977 Jönköping	200m breaststroke
Gold medal – first place	1977 Jönköping	4x100m medley relay
Silver medal – second place	1983 Rome	4x100m medley relay
Bronze medal – third place	1981 Split	100m breaststroke
Bronze medal – third place	1983 Rome	100m breaststroke

Gerald Mörken (born 2 November 1959 in Dortmund) is a German former swimmer who competed in the 1984 Summer Olympics.
