= Robertas Žulpa =

Lithuanian swimmer (1960–2024)

Personal information
- Born: 20 March 1960 Vilnius, Lithuanian SSR, USSR
- Died: 30 August 2024 (aged 64) Vilnius, Lithuania
Medal record
Men's swimming
Representing Soviet Union
Olympic Games
| Gold medal – first place | 1980 Moscow | 200 m breaststroke |
World Championships (LC)
| Silver medal – second place | 1982 Guayaquil | 200 m breaststroke |
European Championships (LC)
| Gold medal – first place | 1981 Split | 200 m breaststroke |
| Gold medal – first place | 1983 Rome | 100 m breaststroke |
| Gold medal – first place | 1983 Rome | 4×100 m medley |
| Bronze medal – third place | 1983 Rome | 200 m breaststroke |
Summer Universiade
| Gold medal – first place | 1983 Edmonton | 200 m breaststroke |
Friendship Games
| Gold medal – first place | 1984 Moscow | 200 metre breaststroke |

Robertas Žulpa (20 March 1960 – 30 August 2024) was a Lithuanian swimmer who competed for the Soviet Union during his professional career.

Žulpa trained at VSS Žalgiris in Vilnius, becoming the Honoured Master of Sports of the USSR in 1980. He won a gold medal in 200 m breaststroke with a time of 2:15.85 at the 1980 Summer Olympics.

In 1988, Žulpa emigrated to Italy where he started to coach swimming to 11-year-old boys. Later, he became Italian–Russian translator for various companies. Žulpa spent much of his time in his native Lithuania working as a Lithuanian–Italian translator.

Žulpa died on 30 August 2024, at the age of 64.
