= Per Wikström =

Swedish swimmer

Personal information
- Born: 29 June 1961 (age 65)
Medal record
Men's swimming
Representing Sweden
World Championships (LC)
Bronze medal – third place	1982 Guayaquil	4×100 m freestyle
European Championships (LC)
Silver medal – second place	1981 Split	4×100 m freestyle
Silver medal – second place	1983 Rome	4×100 m freestyle
Bronze medal – third place	1981 Split	4×200 m freestyle

Per Vilhelm "Pelle" Wikström (born 29 June 1961 in Borlänge, Dalarna) is a former Swedish swimmer who competed in the 1980 Summer Olympics, where he finished 9th in the 100 metres freestyle. He is also father to Swedish swimmers Christoffer and Sebastian Wikström.

== Clubs ==
- Borlänge SS
