= Bill Barrett (swimmer) =

American swimmer (born 1960)

Personal information
- Full name: William Barrett
- Nickname: "Bill"
- National team: United States
- Born: 1960 (age 65–66) Los Angeles, California, U.S.

Sport
- Sport: Swimming
- Strokes: Breaststroke, medley
- Club: Cincinnati Marlins
- College team: University of California, Los Angeles
Medal record
Men's swimming
Representing the United States
World Championships
Silver medal – second place	1982 Guayaquil	200 m medley
Pan American Games
Silver medal – second place	1983 Caracas	200 m medley

William Barrett (born 1960) is an American former competition swimmer who won a silver medal in the 200-meter individual medley at the 1982 World Aquatics Championships. He was recognized as the Pacific-10 Conference swimmer of the year for three consecutive years.

== Swimming ==
In 1980, he won a national title in the same event and set a new world record. He also qualified for the 1980 Summer Olympics in the 100-meter Breaststroke and 200-meter Individual Medley (setting a national record in the latter), but could not compete because of the United States-led boycott over the Soviet invasion of Afghanistan. The same year, Swimming World Magazine named him the American Swimmer of the Year.

== Professional life ==
Barrett enrolled in the University of California, Los Angeles (UCLA), and swam for coach Ron Ballatore's UCLA Bruins swimming and diving team in NCAA competition from 1980 to 1982.

== See also ==
- List of University of California, Los Angeles people
- List of World Aquatics Championships medalists in swimming (men)
- World record progression 200 metres individual medley
