= Melanie Buddemeyer =

American swimmer

Personal information
- Full name: Melanie Buddemeyer
- National team: United States
- Born: 1966 (age 59–60) Likely greater Pittsburgh
- Occupation: Swim coach

Sport
- Sport: Swimming
- Strokes: Butterfly
- Club: Squirrell Hill JCC Swim Club; Chartier Valley Swim Club
- College team: University of North Carolina
- Coach: Al Rose (Squirrell Hill JCC); Drew Thomas (Penn Hills High); Bob Clemmer (Chartier Valley); Frank Comfort (UNC)
Medal record
Women's swimming
Representing the United States
World Championships
Bronze medal – third place	1982 Guayaquil	100 m butterfly
Pan Pacific Swimming Championships
Bronze medal – third place	1985 Tokyo	100 m butterfly
Summer Universiade
Silver medal – second place	1985 Kobe	100 m butterfly

Melanie Buddemeyer (born c. 1966) is an American former competition swimmer who was an All American for the University of North Carolina, and won a bronze medal in the 100-meter butterfly event at the 1982 World Aquatics Championships in Guayaquil, Ecuador.

== Early life ==
Buddemeyer was born in 1966, an only child to William and Shirley Buddemeyer, and grew up in the greater Pittsburgh area. She began swimming at a Penn Hills area local club, known as the Greater Pittsburgh Club when she was seven. From the ages of around 11 through 16, she was coached by Al Rose at the Jewish Community Center in the greater Pittsburgh suburb of Squirrel Hill, later swimming for Bob Clemmer at the Chartiers Valley Club. She graduated from Penn Hills High School in Penn Hills, Pennsylvania in 1984, where she swam for Coach Drew Thomas, and as an outstanding student, was class valedictorian maintaining a 4.0 average through most of her high school career. In addition to usually attending two swim practices per day, she was on the Penn Hills High Cheerleading team. In 1983, she received the Dial Award, which is given to an outstanding female American high-school athlete/scholar of the year.

During her High School years, she won eight gold medals in individual events in the Western Pennsylvania Interscholastic Athletic League, and won an additional eight gold medals for the Pennsylvania Interscholastic Athletic Association. Strongly distinguished in her high school swimming career, at the time only eleven other swimming competitors had ever won eight gold medals in State competition. By the end of her Senior year in June, 1984, she had won 12 state championships in swimming with eight individual and four relay championships. A multi-stroke competitor, she established three Pennsylvania state records in events that included the 200 Individual Medley, and the 100 and 200-yard butterfly. Through February 2020, Buddemeyer remained the only swimmer in the history of the 3A Western Pennsylvania Interscholastic Athletic League to win 8 Individual titles.

== Records ==
In the 100-yard butterfly, she set a High School national record of 54.02 seconds and held a state record in the event through 1998. In 1987, she was the 200 butterfly United States National Champion. During her career, while competing with the U.S. national team, she swam the butterfly portion of a 4x100 meter medley relay that set a world record of 4:06.43.

Despite being second in the World in the 200-meter butterfly in 1984, Buddemeyer placed eighth in the 200-meter butterfly finals at the U.S. Olympic trials with a 2:16.83 on June 30, 1984 in Indianapolis, Indiana. She had swum the event in 2:12.92 at the U.S. Indoor Nationals in March 1984.

== University of North Carolina ==
She attended the University of North Carolina on a swimming scholarship from 1984–1989, where she competed in swimming for talented coach Frank Comfort. An able student at North Carolina she received her degree with majors in both German and Biology. During her collegiate career, she earned NCAA All-American honors four times, and captured Atlantic Coast Conference Championship titles eight times in the 100 and 200 Butterfly events. A formidable opponent in college competition, she was undefeated in her events at North Carolina in every conference championship and dual meet in which she participated.

=== International competition ===
In addition to her 1982 bronze medal in the 100-meter butterfly at the World Aquatics Championships, she captured medals in her signature 100-meter butterfly at the 1985 Pan Pacific Swimming Championships and the 1985 World University Games.

Though she did not swim for the U.S. Olympic team at an Olympics, she made the finals of the U.S. Olympic trials in both 1984 and 1988, but was not high enough in the order of finish to be selected for the Olympic team.

In training for the 1988 Olympic team, Buddemeyer quit attending the University of North Carolina to train with the Pitt Aquatic Club. She returned to North Carolina for the 1988-89 season. Around July 1990, she had knee surgery and considered the possibility of training for the 1992 Olympic trials.

=== Coaching ===
From 1993-1998, she coached swimming for the Hampton Dolphins, a year-round age group U.S. Swimming club in Pennsylvania that trained at the Hampton High School Pool. She had formerly coached at the Squirrell Hill JCC part-time, and then the Penn Hills Club from September, 1990-1993 replacing her former High School Coach Drew Thomas.

She was married to local swimming competitor Mike Kozlina, a varsity swim coach at Hampton High School, who was an All-American swimmer at the University of Pittsburgh. Melanie is the mother of Alexa (Ali) Kozlina and Michael (Shane) Kozlina jr.

=== Honors ===
In 2011, she became a member of the Western Pennsylvania Interscholastic Athletic League Hall of Fame. She was inducted into the Pennsylvania Sports Hall of Fame in 2009. At Penn Hills High, she was voted Female Athlete of the Year, and was a Dapper Dan Athlete of the Year in 1984 and 1982. In 1981, she was a "Rookie of the Year" for USA Swimming. She became a member of the Penn Hills High School Hall of Fame in 1994, and was a 1983 Inductee into the Jewish Sports Hall of Fame of Western Pennsylvania.
