= Jens-Peter Berndt =

East German swimmer

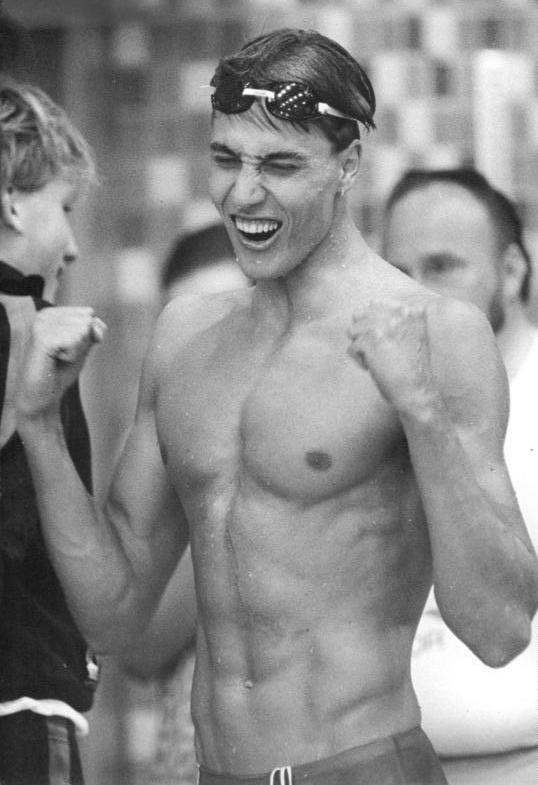
- Berndt in 1984

Personal information
- Born: 17 August 1963 (age 62) Potsdam, East Germany
- Height: 1.98 m (6 ft 6 in)
- Weight: 81 kg (179 lb)

Sport
- Sport: Swimming
- Club: ASK Vorwärts Potsdam (GDR), Sportgemeinschaft Hamburg (FRG), University of Alabama (US)
Medal record
Men's swimming
Representing East Germany
Friendship Games
Gold medal – first place	1984 Moscow	200 m medley
Gold medal – first place	1984 Moscow	400 m medley
World Championships
Silver medal – second place	1982 Guayaquil	400 m medley
European Championships
Silver medal – second place	1983 Rome	200 m medley
Silver medal – second place	1983 Rome	400 m medley

Jens-Peter Berndt (born 17 August 1963) is a retired German swimmer. He who won three silver medals in medley event at the 1982 World Aquatics Championships and 1983 European Aquatics Championships. In May 1984 he set a world record in the 400 m medley, but could not participate in the 1984 Summer Olympics because of its boycott by East Germany. Instead, he competed at the Friendship Games, winning two gold medals in medley events.

Frustrated with lack of freedoms in his country, on 7 January 1985 Berndt spontaneously defected to the United States at the Oklahoma City airport while returning from competitions, leaving his father and sister in Potsdam. Berndt was granted asylum, enrolled to the University of Alabama, became adopted by Thomas and Becky Patterson of Birmingham, and obtained a permanent resident status. While he wanted to compete in the 1988 Olympics for the US, he was not eligible for US citizenship until 1990.

He turned to West Germany. In May 1988 he traveled from the US to Hamburg and finished within top three in two backstroke and two medley events at the national championships. He was thus selected for the 1988 Summer Olympics by West Germany, and allowed to compete by the International Olympic Committee (IOC). While the IOC normally requires from athletes a three-year stay in a country that they are going to represent, the IOC respected the constitution of West Germany that automatically granted citizenship to all East Germans since their birth.

At the Olympics, Berndt finished sixth in the 200 m backstroke and 400 m medley. After the games, he returned to the United States, graduated in public relations and marketing and worked for US companies.
