= Sergey Smiryagin =

Russian swimmer (1963–2020)

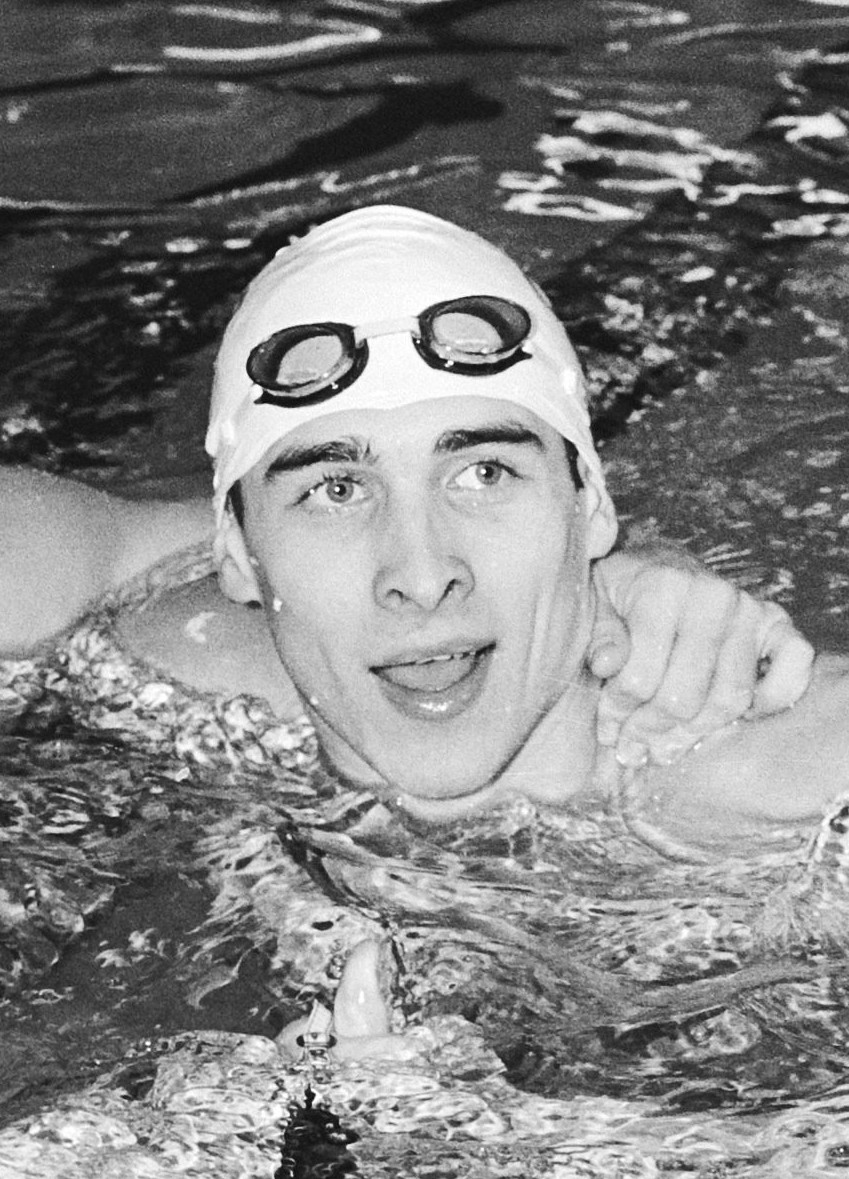
- Smiryagin in 1983

Personal information
- Born: 27 October 1963 Moscow, Soviet Union
- Died: 11 July 2020 (aged 56)
- Height: 1.90 m (6 ft 3 in)
- Weight: 73 kg (161 lb)

Sport
- Sport: Swimming
Medal record
World Championships
| Silver medal – second place | 1982 Guayaquil | 4×100 m freestyle |
| Silver medal – second place | 1982 Guayaquil | 4×100 m medley |
| Silver medal – second place | 1986 Madrid | 4×100 m freestyle |
European Championships
| Gold medal – first place | 1981 Split | 4×100 m medley |
| Gold medal – first place | 1983 Rome | 4×100 m freestyle |
| Gold medal – first place | 1983 Rome | 4×100 m medley |
| Bronze medal – third place | 1983 Rome | 100 m freestyle |
Summer Universiade
| Gold medal – first place | 1983 Edmonton | 100 m freestyle |
Friendship Games
| Gold medal – first place | 1984 Moscow | 4×100 m freestyle |
| Gold medal – first place | 1984 Moscow | 4×100 m medley |
| Gold medal – first place | 1984 Moscow | 100 m freestyle |

Sergey Smiryagin (Russian: Серге́й Смирягин; 27 October 1963 – 11 July 2020) was a Russian freestyle swimmer. He competed at the 1980 Summer Olympics in the 100 m freestyle, but failed to reach the final.

After the Olympics he won three European titles and three silver medals at the world championships, as well as a gold medal at the 1983 Summer Universiade. He missed the 1984 Summer Olympics due to their boycott by the Soviet Union and competed in the Friendship Games instead, winning three gold medals.
