= Cornelia Sirch =

East German swimmer (born 1966)

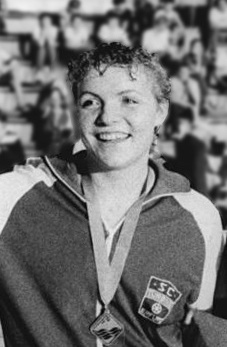
- Sirch in 1986

Personal information
- Born: 23 October 1966 (age 59) Erfurt, East Germany
- Height: 1.76 m (5 ft 9 in)
- Weight: 70 kg (154 lb)

Sport
- Sport: Swimming
- Club: SC Turbine Erfurt
Medal record
Representing East Germany
Olympic Games
Gold medal – first place	1988 Seoul	4 × 100 m medley relay
Bronze medal – third place	1988 Seoul	100 m backstroke
Bronze medal – third place	1988 Seoul	200 m backstroke
World Championships
Gold medal – first place	1982 Guayaquil	200 m backstroke
Gold medal – first place	1986 Madrid	200 m backstroke
European Championships
Gold medal – first place	1983 Rome	200 m backstroke
Gold medal – first place	1983 Rome	4 × 100 m freestyle
Gold medal – first place	1983 Rome	4 × 200 m freestyle
Gold medal – first place	1985 Sofia	200 m backstroke
Gold medal – first place	1987 Strasbourg	200 m backstroke
Gold medal – first place	1987 Strasbourg	200 m individual medley
Silver medal – second place	1983 Rome	100 m backstroke
Silver medal – second place	1985 Sofia	200 m individual medley

Cornelia Sirch (born 23 October 1966) is a former East German backstroke swimmer. She competed at the 1988 Summer Olympics in three events and won two bronze medals in the 100 m and 200 m backstroke and a gold medal in the 4 × 100 m medley relay, in which she swam in a preliminary round. In 1982 she was named Swimming World's European Swimmer of the Year, after winning 200 m backstroke at the World Championships in Guayaguil in a world record time of 2:09.91, becoming the first woman to dip under 2 minutes 10 seconds.

Between 1983 and 1987 she won six gold and two silver medals at European championships. She retired shortly after the 1988 Olympics and later had serious health problems, which she attributed to doping she had to take as part of the East German training system. Her European Swimmer of the Year title was vacated in 2013, due to her participation in the doping program.

Awards
Preceded by Ute Geweniger	European Swimmer of the Year; 1982	Succeeded by Ute Geweniger
