= Svetlana Varganova =

Russian swimmer

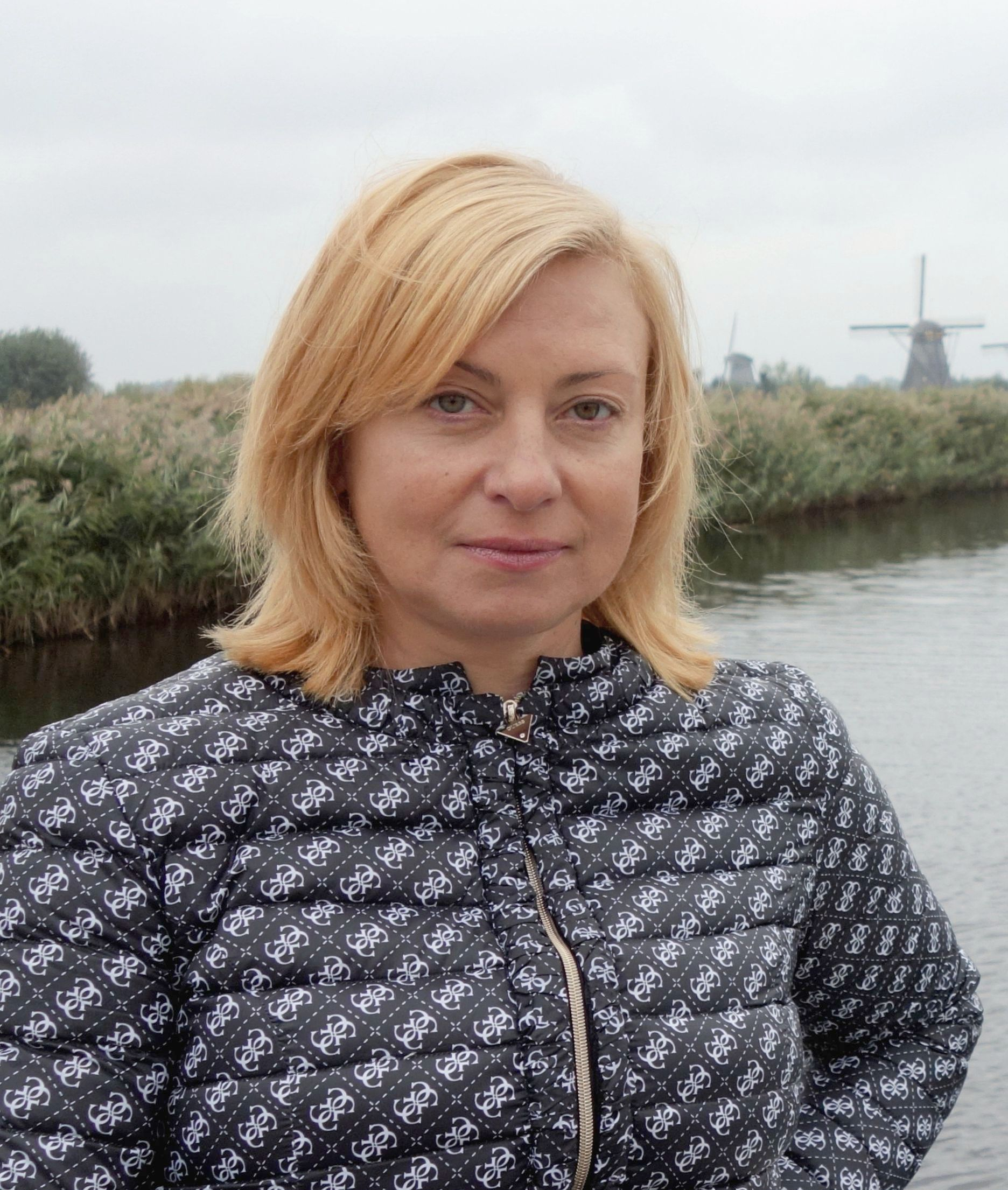

Personal information
- Born: November 19, 1964 (age 61) Leningrad, Soviet Union

Sport
- Sport: Swimming
- Strokes: Breaststroke
Medal record
Representing the Soviet Union
Olympic Games
Silver medal – second place	1980 Moscow	200 m breaststroke
World Championships
Gold medal – first place	1982 Guayaquil	200m breaststroke
Bronze medal – third place	1982 Guayaquil	4x100m medley relay

Svetlana Varganova (born 19 November 1964) is a Russian former swimmer who competed in the 1980 Summer Olympics.

Throughout her athletic career, Svetlana Varganova participated in two major international competitions, namely the 1980 Olympics and the 1982 World Championships. At the Olympics, she won a silver medal in the 200m breaststroke event, while at the 1982 Worlds, she achieved a gold medal in the same event, as well as a bronze medal in the medley relay. In addition, Varganova broke a world record for the 200m breaststroke, recording a time of 2:31.09 in 1979. In national competitions, she won a single Soviet title for the 100 breaststroke in 1982, and also secured two silver medals (1982–83) and two bronze medals (1979, 1981) for the 200 breaststroke event at the Soviet championships. Following the conclusion of her competitive career, Varganova worked as a swimming coach in her hometown of Leningrad, which is now known as St. Petersburg.

She was arrested in an extensive drug bust conducted by Narcotics Control Bureau of Government of India in Goa, India in April 2023.
