= Irina Gerasimova =

Georgian swimmer

Personal information
- Born: 9 February 1964 (age 62) Kutaisi, USSR
- Height: 1.68 m (5 ft 6 in)
- Weight: 52 kg (115 lb)

Sport
- Sport: Swimming
Medal record
Women's swimming
Representing Soviet Union
World Championships
| Bronze medal – third place | 1982 Guayaquil | 4×100 m medley |
European Championships
| Bronze medal – third place | 1983 Rome | 200 m medley |
Summer Universiade
| Gold medal – first place | 1983 Edmonton | 200 m medley |
| Gold medal – first place | 1983 Edmonton | 400 m medley |
| Bronze medal – third place | 1983 Edmonton | 200 m freestyle |

Irina Gerasimova (Russian: Ирина Герасимова, Georgian: ირინა გერასიმოვა; born 9 February 1964) is a retired Georgian swimmer who won two bronze medals in medley events at the 1982 World Aquatics Championships and 1983 European Aquatics Championships. She also competed at the 1980 Summer Olympics in the 4 × 100 m freestyle relay, but her team was disqualified for an improper changeover. She won the 200 m and 400 m medley events at the 1983 Universiade.
