= Natalia Pokas =

Soviet swimmer (born 1965)

Personal information
- Born: 1 September 1965 (age 60)

Sport
- Sport: Swimming
- Club: Trud Moscow
Medal record
Representing Soviet Union
World Championships
| Bronze medal – third place | 1982 Guayaquil | 4×100 m medley |
European Championships
| Silver medal – second place | 1981 Split | 4×100 m medley |

Natalia Pokas (Russian: Наталия Покас; born 1 September 1965) is a retired Soviet butterfly swimmer. She won a bronze medal at the 1982 World Aquatics Championships and a silver medal at the 1981 European Aquatics Championships, both in the 4 × 100 m medley relay.

== National championships ==
- 1981 – 1st in 100 m and 200 m butterfly; 3rd in 4 × 100 m medley.
- 1983 – 2nd in 100 m butterfly.
- 1986 – 2nd in 50 m butterfly.

She missed the 1982 championships due to a leg injury.

== Masters competitions ==
After marriage she changed her last name to Matveeva (Russian: Матвеева). In the 2000s, she competed in the masters category and won two gold and one silver medals at the world championship in 2010, as well as four gold, one silver and two bronze medals at the European championships of 2007–2011. Nationally, she won eight titles and set 20 records between 2005 and 2008.
