= Yuri Kis =

Russian swimmer

Personal information
- Born: 7 April 1962 (age 64) Temirtau, Kazakh SSR, Soviet Union

Sport
- Sport: Swimming
- Club: Dynamo Moscow
Medal record
Representing Soviet Union
World Championships
Silver medal – second place	1982 Guayaquil	4×100 m medley
European Championships
Gold medal – first place	1981 Split	100 m breaststroke
Gold medal – first place	1981 Split	4×100 m medley
Summer Universiade
Silver medal – second place	1983 Edmonton	100 m breaststroke

Yuri Ivanovich Kis (Russian: Юрий Иванович Кис; born 7 April 1962) is a retired Russian breaststroke swimmer. He won two gold medals at the 1981 European Aquatics Championships and a silver medal in the 4×100 m medley relay at the 1982 World Aquatics Championships. He won the national championships in the 100 m breaststroke in 1980 and 1983 and finished second in 200 m in 1982.

After retiring from swimming he worked as a swimming instructor in Moscow.
