= Susan Habernigg =

American swimmer

Personal information
- Born: 1964 (age 61–62)

Sport
- Sport: Swimming
Medal record
Representing United States
World Championships
Silver medal – second place	1982 Guayaquil	4×100 m freestyle

Susan "Sue" Habernigg (born c. 1964) is a retired American swimmer who won a silver medal in the 4 × 100 m freestyle relay at the 1982 World Aquatics Championships.

She graduated from the University of Southern California. In 1981, she set an Oregon School Activities Association (OSAA) meet records in the 50-yard freestyle that stood until 2010 – the longest-held record in the OSAA history.

== See also ==
- List of World Aquatics Championships medalists in swimming (women)
