= Susanne Link =

German swimmer

Sport
- Sport: Swimming
- Club: SC Empor Rostock
Medal record
Representing East Germany
World Championships
Gold medal – first place	1982 Guayaquil	4×100 m freestyle
European Championships
Gold medal – first place	1981 Split	4×100 m freestyle
Gold medal – first place	1983 Rome	4×100 m freestyle

Susanne Link is a retired German swimmer who won three gold medals in the 4×100 m freestyle relay at the European and world championships in 1981–1983.
