= Darjan Petrič =

Yugoslav freestyle swimmer (born 1964)

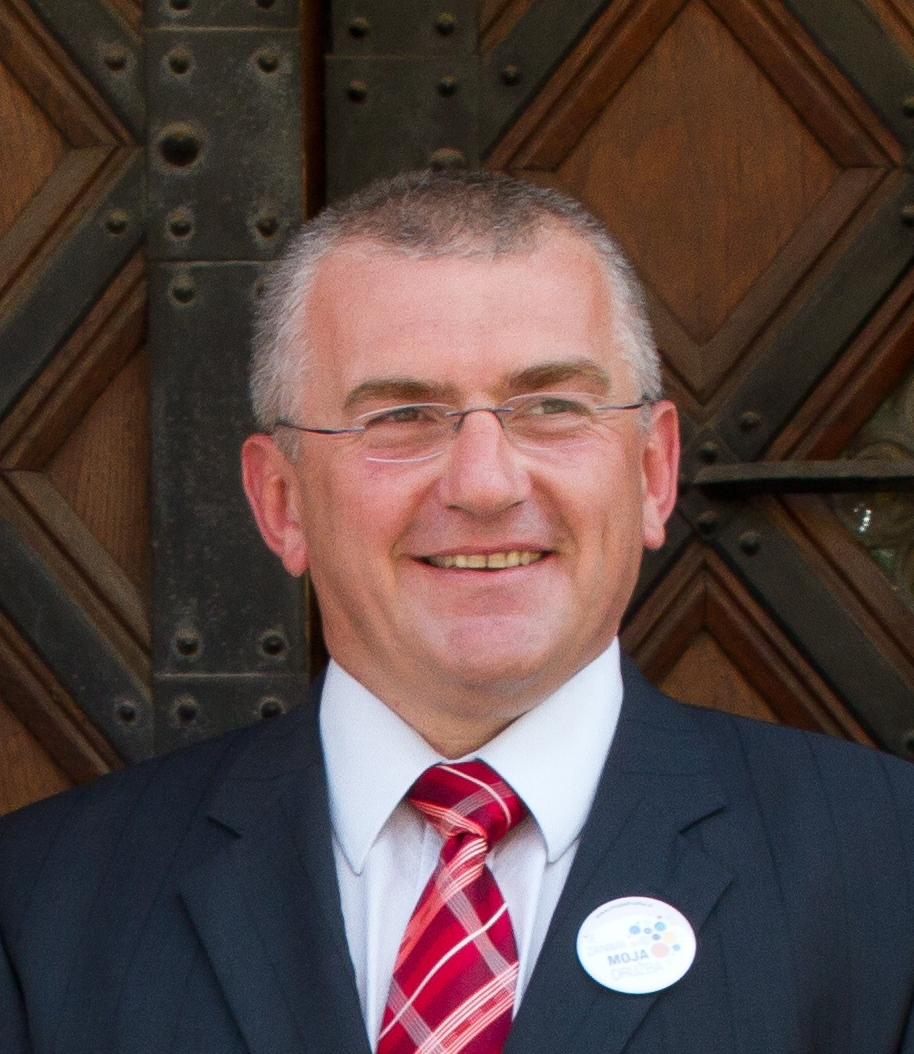

Medal record

Men's Swimming

Representing Yugoslavia

World Championships
Bronze medal – third place	1982 Guayaquil	1500 m freestyle

European Championships
Bronze medal – third place	1981 Split	400 m freestyle
Bronze medal – third place	1983 Rome	400 m freestyle

Mediterranean Games
Gold medal – first place	1983 Casablanca	400 m freestyle

Summer Universiade
Silver medal – second place	1987 Zagreb	400 m freestyle
Silver medal – second place	1987 Zagreb	1500 m freestyle

Darjan Petrič (born August 24, 1964 in Kranj, Slovenia) is a former Yugoslav freestyle swimmer of Slovene ethnicity, who represented Yugoslavia in three consecutive Summer Olympics, starting in 1980. He is the brother of swimmer Borut Petrič, the youngest participant (14 years, 325 days) at the 1976 Summer Olympics in Montreal, Quebec, Canada.

At the 1987 Summer Universiade in Zagreb, Petrič won two silver medals in the 400 and 1500-metre freestyle.

In 2010, he was a candidate in the election for the mayor of City Municipality of Kranj, but failed to pass the first round, receiving 16,92% votes.
