= Larisa Gorchakova =

Russian swimmer

Personal information
- Full name: Larisa Veniaminovna Gorchakova
- Nationality: Russian
- Born: 9 July 1964 (age 61) Volzhsky, Volgograd, Russian SFSR, Soviet Union
- Height: 1.74 m (5 ft 9 in)
- Weight: 57 kg (126 lb)

Sport
- Sport: Swimming
- Club: Trud Volgograd
Medal record
Women's swimming
Representing the Soviet Union
World Championships
Bronze medal – third place	1982 Guayaquil	4×100 m medley
European Championships
Silver medal – second place	1981 Split	4×100 m medley
Bronze medal – third place	1981 Split	200 m backstroke
Bronze medal – third place	1983 Rome	200 m backstroke
Summer Universiade
Gold medal – first place	1983 Edmonton	100 m backstroke
Gold medal – first place	1983 Edmonton	200 m backstroke

Larisa Veniaminovna Gorchakova (Russian: Лариса Вениаминовна Горчакова, also spelled Gortchacova; born 9 July 1964) is a Russian backstroke swimmer, who won a bronze medal at the 1982 World Aquatics Championships and three medals at the 1981 European Aquatics Championships. She also competed at the 1980 Summer Olympics and finished sixth in the 100 m and eights in the 200 m backstroke events. Between 1981 and 1984, she won five national titles (USSR).

After retirement, between 1998 and 2000, she set five national (Russia) records and won two national titles in masters divisions.
