= Aleksey Markovsky =

Russian swimmer (born 1957)

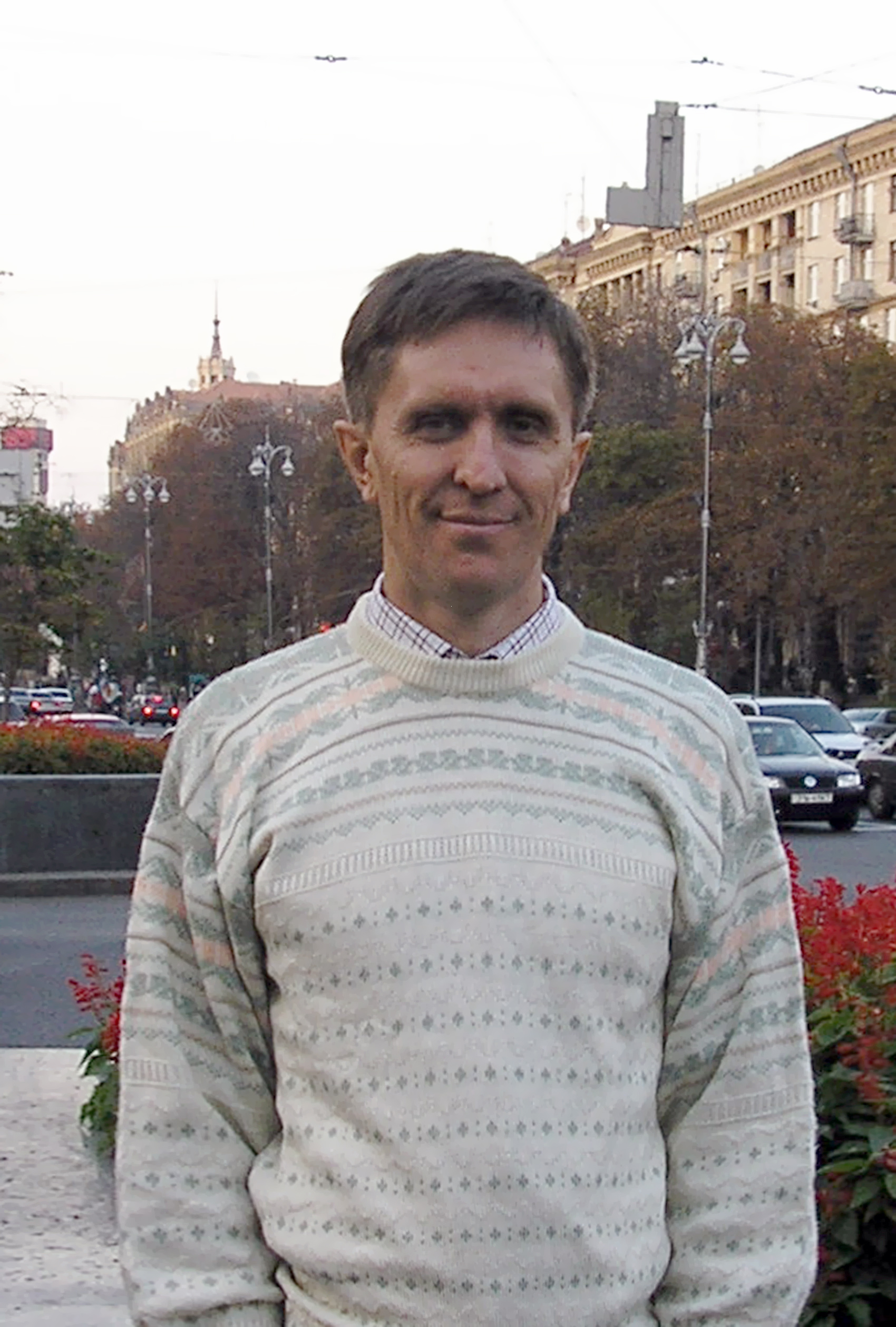
- Markovsky in 2005

Personal information
- Born: 17 May 1957 (age 69) Kurgan, Kurgan Oblast, Russian SFSR, Soviet Union
- Height: 1.88 m (6 ft 2 in)
- Weight: 83 kg (183 lb)

Sport
- Sport: Swimming
- Club: Lokomotiv Moscow
Medal record
Representing Soviet Union
Olympic Games
Silver medal – second place	1980 Moscow	4×100 m medley
World Championships
Silver medal – second place	1982 Guayaquil	4×100 m freestyle
Silver medal – second place	1982 Guayaquil	4×100 m medley
Silver medal – second place	1986 Madrid	4×100 m freestyle
Bronze medal – third place	1986 Madrid	4×100 m medley
European Championships
Gold medal – first place	1981 Split	100 m butterfly
Gold medal – first place	1981 Split	4×100 m medley
Gold medal – first place	1983 Rome	4×100 m freestyle
Gold medal – first place	1983 Rome	4×100 m medley
Bronze medal – third place	1983 Rome	100 m butterfly
Summer Universiade
Gold medal – first place	1983 Edmonton	100 m butterfly
Silver medal – second place	1981 Bucharest	200 m medley
Silver medal – second place	1981 Bucharest	4x100 m freestyle
Friendship Games
Gold medal – first place	1984 Moscow	100 m butterfly
Gold medal – first place	1984 Moscow	4×100 m freestyle
Gold medal – first place	1984 Moscow	4×100 m medley
Silver medal – second place	1984 Moscow	100 m freestyle

Aleksey Viktorovich Markovsky (Russian: Алексей Викторович Марковский; born 17 May 1957) is a Russian retired swimmer who won a silver medal in the 4 × 100 m medley relay at the 1980 Summer Olympics; he finished eighth in the 100 m butterfly event at the same Olympics. After the games, between 1981 and 1986 (aged 24–29) he won ten medals at the World and European Championships, mostly in relay events. He missed the 1984 Summer Olympics that were boycotted by the Soviet Union, and took part in the Friendship Games instead.

He graduated from the Ural State University of Physical Culture in Chelyabinsk. After retiring from swimming, between 1988 and 1992 he was the head coach of the junior Soviet swimming team.
