= Rainer Sternal =

German swimmer

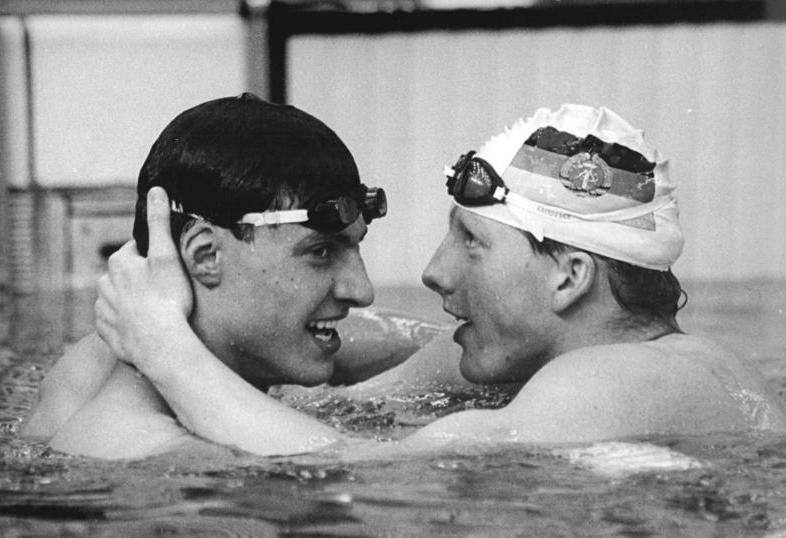
- Rainer Sternal (right) and Sven Lodziewski in 1987

Sport
- Sport: Swimming
- Club: SC Magdeburg
Medal record
Representing East Germany
European Championships
Silver medal – second place	1981 Split	4×200 m freestyle
Silver medal – second place	1983 Rome	4×200 m freestyle
Bronze medal – third place	1983 Rome	4×100 m freestyle

Rainer Sternal is a German swimmer who won three medals in freestyle relay events at the European championships in 1981 and 1983. During his career he won five national titles: in the individual 200 m medley (1985, 1986), 4 × 200 m freestyle relay (1984), and 4 × 100 m medley relay (1982, 1986).
