= Svyatoslav Semenov =

Soviet swimmer (born 1962)

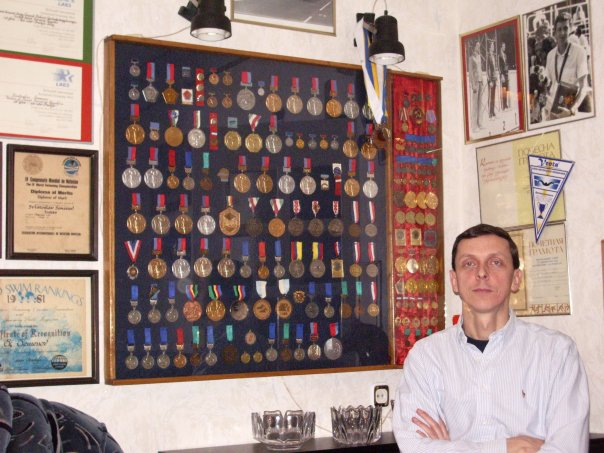
- Semenov with medals, 2021

Personal information
- Born: 2 February 1962 (age 64) Kyiv, Ukrainian SSR, Soviet Union

Sport
- Sport: Swimming
- Club: SKA Kyiv (1980); Dynamo Kyiv (1981–1984)
Medal record
Representing Soviet Union
World Championships
Silver medal – second place	1982 Guayaquil	400 m freestyle
Silver medal – second place	1982 Guayaquil	1500 m freestyle
Summer Universiade
Silver medal – second place	1983 Edmonton	1500 m freestyle
Bronze medal – third place	1983 Edmonton	400 m freestyle
Friendship Games
Bronze medal – third place	1984 Moscow	400 m freestyle
Bronze medal – third place	1984 Moscow	1500 m freestyle

Svyatoslav Semenov (Russian: Святослав Семёнов; born 2 February 1962) is a retired Soviet swimmer. He competed at the 1982 World Aquatics Championships and won silver medals in the 400 m and 1500 m freestyle events. He missed the 1984 Summer Olympics, which were boycotted by the Soviet Union, and took part in the Friendship Games instead, winning two bronze medals in the same freestyle events. Between 1980 and 1984, he won four national titles in various freestyle events.

He graduated from the National University of Physical Education and Sports of Ukraine. Since 1989 he competed in the masters category.
