= Giovanni Franceschi =

Italian swimmer (born 1963)

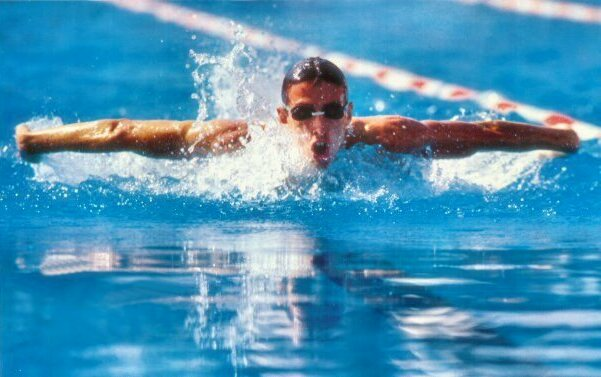

Personal information
- Full name: Giovanni Franceschi
- Nickname: "Long John"
- Nationality: Italy
- Born: 25 April 1963 (age 63) Milan, Italy
- Height: 1.92 m (6 ft 4 in)
- Weight: 78 kg (172 lb)

Sport
- Sport: Swimming
Medal record
European Championships
Gold medal – first place	1983 Rome	200 m medley
Gold medal – first place	1983 Rome	400 m medley
Silver medal – second place	1981 Split	200 m medley
Bronze medal – third place	1981 Split	400 m medley
World Championships
Bronze medal – third place	1982 Guayaquil	200 m medley
Mediterranean Games
Gold medal – first place	1983 Casablanca	400 m medley
Silver medal – second place	1979 Split	400 m medley

Giovanni Franceschi (born 25 April 1963 in Milan) is an Italian swimmer who won two five medals in medley disciplines at European Championships of 1981–1983. He also competed in three events at the 1980 and 1984 Summer Olympics with the best achievement of eights place in the 400 m medley in 1984. During his career, Franceschi won 41 national titles in various freestyle, backstroke, butterfly and medley events. At the 1983 European Championships, held in Rome, he won both the 200 and 400 medley events, setting a European record in both finals.

== Biography ==
His elder brother, Raffaele Franceschi, is also a retired Olympic swimmer. He encouraged Giovanni to start swimming in a pool, which was located just meters from their home.

Franceschi is currently leading a project, SwimCamp, which aims to improve swimming technique of any participant older than 8 years old.
