= Ina Kleber =

East German swimmer

Personal information
- Nationality: East German
- Born: 29 September 1964 (age 61) Greiz, Bezirk Gera, East Germany
- Height: 1.80 m (5 ft 11 in)
- Weight: 64 kg (141 lb)

Sport
- Sport: Swimming
- Strokes: Backstroke
- Club: SC Turbine Erfurt
Medal record
Women's swimming
Representing East Germany
Silver medal – second place	1980 Moscow	100 m backstroke
World Championships
Silver medal – second place	1982 Guayaquil	100 m backstroke
European Championships
Gold medal – first place	1981 Split	100 m backstroke
Gold medal – first place	1981 Split	4 × 100 m medley relay
Gold medal – first place	1983 Rome	100 m backstroke
Gold medal – first place	1983 Rome	4 × 100 m medley relay
Friendship Games
Gold medal – first place	1984 Moscow	100 m backstroke
Gold medal – first place	1984 Moscow	4 × 100 m medley relay

Ina Kleber (later Buttgereit, born 29 September 1964 in Greiz) is a German former swimmer who competed in the 1980 Summer Olympics representing East Germany.
