= Vladimir Shemetov =

Soviet swimmer (born 1964)

Personal information
- Born: 9 March 1964 (age 62)
Medal record
Men's Swimming
Representing the Soviet Union
World Championships (LC)
Silver medal – second place	1982 Guayaquil	4×200 m freestyle
Silver medal – second place	1982 Guayaquil	4×100 m medley
Bronze medal – third place	1982 Guayaquil	100 m backstroke
European Championships (LC)
Gold medal – first place	1981 Split	4×100 m freestyle
Gold medal – first place	1981 Split	4×200 m freestyle
Gold medal – first place	1983 Rome	4×100 m medley
Silver medal – second place	1981 Split	100 m backstroke
Silver medal – second place	1981 Split	200 m backstroke
Silver medal – second place	1983 Rome	100 m backstroke
Bronze medal – third place	1987 Strasbourg	4×100 m freestyle
Summer Universiade
Silver medal – second place	1983 Edmonton	100 m backstroke
Silver medal – second place	1983 Edmonton	200 m backstroke
Friendship Games
Gold medal – first place	1984 Moscow	4×100 m medley relay
Silver medal – second place	1984 Moscow	4×200 m freestyle relay

Vladimir Shemetov (Russian: Владимир Шеметов; born 9 March 1964) is a former backstroke swimmer from the Soviet Union who competed at the boycotted 1980 Summer Olympics in Moscow, USSR, and won two silver medals at the 1981 European Championships in Split.

Trained by Honored Coach of Russia Alexey Karpov.
