= Ines Geissler =

East German swimmer

Ines Geißler
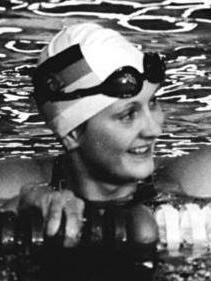
- Ines Geißler in 1982

Personal information
- Nationality: East German
- Born: 16 February 1963 (age 63) Marienberg, Bezirk Karl-Marx-Stadt, East Germany
- Height: 1.64 m (5 ft 5 in)
- Weight: 56 kg (123 lb)

Sport
- Sport: Swimming
- Strokes: Butterfly; Freestyle
- Club: SC Karl-Marx-Stadt
Medal record
Women's swimming
Representing East Germany
Olympic Games
Gold medal – first place	1980 Moscow	200 m butterfly
World Championships (LC)
Gold medal – first place	1982 Guayaquil	200 m butterfly
Gold medal – first place	1982 Guayaquil	4×100 m medley
Silver medal – second place	1982 Guayaquil	100 m butterfly
European Championships (LC)
Gold medal – first place	1981 Split	200 m butterfly
Gold medal – first place	1981 Split	4×100 m medley
Gold medal – first place	1983 Rome	100 m butterfly
Gold medal – first place	1983 Rome	4×100 m medley
Silver medal – second place	1981 Split	100 m butterfly
Silver medal – second place	1983 Rome	200 m butterfly

Ines Geißler (later Kaulfuss, born 16 February 1963 in Marienberg, Saxony), commonly spelled Ines Geissler in English, is a former butterfly swimmer from East Germany, who won the gold medal in the 200 m butterfly at the 1980 Summer Olympics in Moscow, Soviet Union.
