= Jörg Woithe =

German former swimmer (born 1963)

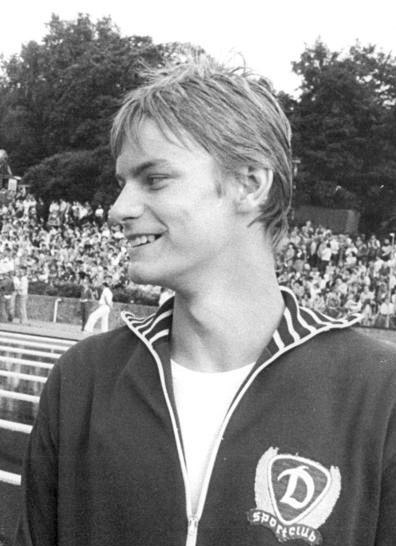
- Jörg Woithe in 1979

Personal information
- Nationality: East Germany
- Born: 11 April 1963 (age 63) East Berlin, East Germany
- Height: 1.98 m (6 ft 6 in)
- Weight: 105 kg (231 lb)

Sport
- Sport: Swimming
- Strokes: Freestyle
- Club: SC Dynamo Berlin
Medal record
Representing East Germany
Olympic Games
Gold medal – first place	1980 Moscow	100 m freestyle
Silver medal – second place	1980 Moscow	4×200 m freestyle
World Championships
Gold medal – first place	1982 Guayaquil	100 m freestyle
Bronze medal – third place	1982 Guayaquil	200 m freestyle
Bronze medal – third place	1986 Madrid	4×100 m freestyle
European Championships
Gold medal – first place	1987 Strasbourg	50 m freestyle
Silver medal – second place	1981 Split	100 m freestyle
Silver medal – second place	1983 Rome	100 m freestyle
Silver medal – second place	1983 Rome	200 m freestyle
Silver medal – second place	1983 Rome	4×200 m freestyle
Silver medal – second place	1985 Sofia	100 m freestyle
Silver medal – second place	1985 Sofia	4×100 m freestyle
Silver medal – second place	1985 Sofia	4×100 m medley
Bronze medal – third place	1981 Split	4×100 m medley
Bronze medal – third place	1983 Rome	4×100 m freestyle
Bronze medal – third place	1983 Rome	4×100 m medley

Jörg Woithe (born 11 April 1963) is a German former swimmer. He competed at the 1980 Summer Olympics in Moscow and won a gold medal in the 100 m freestyle and a silver medal in the 4 × 200 m freestyle relay; he finished fourth in the 200 m freestyle and 4 × 100 m freestyle relay.

Between 1981 and 1987 he won two gold, seven silver and five bronze medals at the world and European championships.

After retiring from swimming he received a degree from the German Institute of Physical Education and Sport in Leipzig / Germany ( Deutsche Hochschule für Körperkultur und Sport - DHfK ) via distance learning. He then worked as a swimming coach, and was also employed by companies producing swimming articles and high-performance lubricants. In 2012 he was hired by the Iranian swimming national team.
