= Per Johansson (swimmer) =

Swedish swimmer (born 1963)

Personal information
- Full name: Per Lennart Johansson
- Nationality: Swedish
- Born: 25 January 1963 (age 63) Borlänge, Dalarna, Sweden
- Height: 1.94 m (6 ft 4 in)
- Weight: 85 kg (187 lb)

Sport
- Sport: Swimming
- Strokes: Freestyle
- Club: Borlänge SS
Medal record
Men's swimming
Representing Sweden
Olympic Games
Bronze medal – third place	1980 Moscow	100 m freestyle
Bronze medal – third place	1984 Los Angeles	100 m freestyle
Bronze medal – third place	1984 Los Angeles	4×100 m freestyle
World Championships (LC)
Bronze medal – third place	1982 Guayaquil	100 m freestyle
Bronze medal – third place	1982 Guayaquil	4×100 m freestyle
European Championships (LC)
Gold medal – first place	1981 Split	100 m freestyle
Gold medal – first place	1983 Rome	100 m freestyle
Silver medal – second place	1981 Split	4×100 m freestyle
Silver medal – second place	1981 Split	4×100 m medley
Silver medal – second place	1983 Rome	4×100 m freestyle
Silver medal – second place	1985 Sofia	4×200 m freestyle
Bronze medal – third place	1985 Sofia	4×100 m freestyle

Per Lennart Johansson (born 25 January 1963 in Borlänge, Dalarna) is a former freestyle swimmer from Sweden. He won two individual Olympic bronze medals in the 100 m freestyle in 1980 and 1984. Both in 1981 and 1983 he became European champion. Johansson was nicknamed Senan.

== Personal bests ==
=== Long course (50 m) ===
Event	Time	Date	Meet	Location	Ref
50 m freestyle	22.89	16 Apr 1988	Swedish SC Championships	Örebro, Sweden	
100 m freestyle	50.02	15 Apr 1988	Swedish SC Championships	Örebro, Sweden	

Legend: WR – World record; ER – European record; NR – Swedish record;
Records not set in finals: h – heat; sf – semifinal; r – relay 1st leg; rh – relay heat 1st leg; b – B final; † – en route to final mark; so – swim-off; tt – time trial

== Clubs ==
- Borlänge SS

Sporting positions
Preceded by Bengt Baron	Swedish National LC Champion men's 50 m freestyle 1985 – 1986	Succeeded by Göran Titus
