= Birgit Meineke =

East German swimmer (born 1964)

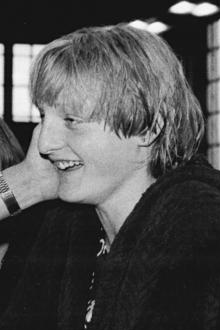
- Birgit Meineke in 1981

Personal information
- Full name: Birgit Meineke
- Nationality: East Germany
- Born: 4 July 1964 (age 62) East Berlin, East Germany
- Height: 1.82 m (6 ft 0 in)
- Weight: 68 kg (150 lb)

Sport
- Sport: Swimming
- Strokes: Freestyle
- Club: SC Dynamo Berlin
Medal record
Representing East Germany
World Championships
Gold medal – first place	1982 Guayaquil	100 m freestyle
Gold medal – first place	1982 Guayaquil	4×100 m medley
Gold medal – first place	1982 Guayaquil	4×100 m freestyle
Silver medal – second place	1982 Guayaquil	200 m freestyle
European Championships
Gold medal – first place	1981 Split	4×100 m freestyle
Gold medal – first place	1983 Rome	100 m freestyle
Gold medal – first place	1983 Rome	200 m freestyle
Gold medal – first place	1983 Rome	4×100 m medley
Gold medal – first place	1983 Rome	4×100 m freestyle
Gold medal – first place	1983 Rome	4×200 m freestyle
Silver medal – second place	1981 Split	200 m freestyle
Silver medal – second place	1981 Split	100 m freestyle

Birgit Meineke (later Heukrodt, born 4 July 1964) is a retired East German swimmer. She was the fastest female swimmer in the 100 m freestyle between 1980 and 1984.

== Career ==
Meineke was strongest in the early 1980s, winning a gold medal as part of the East German team for the 4 × 100 m freestyle relay in the 1981 European Aquatics Championships, as well as two silver medals in the same year for the 200 meter and 100 meter freestyle. In the same year, she also established a world record in the short course 100 m freestyle, with a time of 54.04 seconds. While her performance at the 1982 World Aquatics Championships was similarly strong, the pinnacle of her career was a sweep of five golds at the 1983 European Aquatics Championships in Rome.

Meineke was unable to compete in the Olympics due to the boycott of the 1984 Los Angeles Olympics by 14 Eastern Bloc countries, including East Germany. However, she won several medals at the Friendship Games, including two gold medals as part of the teams for the 4 × 100 m freestyle relay and the 4 × 100 m medley relay, the latter of which broke a world record. She ended her swimming career in that year, later becoming a general surgeon.

Meineke was married to canoer Olaf Heukrodt.

=== East German doping ===
Like many other East German female athletes, Meineke was subject to systematic administration of performance-enhancing drugs. These caused health problems for her in later life, including a liver tumor she attributed to the use of anabolic steroids and birth control pills.

In 1998, former coach Rolf Gläser admitted to administering steroids to Meineke and her teammates and was fined $4000 for causing bodily harm.
