= Swimming at the 1984 Summer Olympics – Men's 4 × 100 metre freestyle relay =

Men's 4 × 100 metre freestyle relay at the Games of the XXIII Olympiad
- Venue: McDonald's Olympic Swim Stadium
- Date: August 2, 1984 (heats & final)
- Competitors: 99 from 23 nations
- Teams: 23
- Winning time: 3:19.03 WR

Medalists
1st place, gold medalist(s)		Chris Cavanaugh, Mike Heath, Matt Biondi, Rowdy Gaines, Tom Jager*, Robin Leamy*	United States
2nd place, silver medalist(s)		Greg Fasala, Neil Brooks, Michael Delany, Mark Stockwell	Australia
3rd place, bronze medalist(s)		Thomas Lejdström, Bengt Baron, Mikael Örn, Per Johansson, Rikard Milton*, Michael Söderlund*; *Indicates the swimmer only competed in the preliminary heats.	Sweden

The final of the men's 4 × 100 metre freestyle relay event at the 1984 Summer Olympics was held in Los Angeles, California, on August 2, 1984. 23 teams participated in the heats, with the eight fastest qualifying for the final.

== Records ==
Prior to this competition, the existing world and Olympic records were as follows.

World record	United States (USA); Chris Cavanaugh (50.13); Robin Leamy (50.10); David McCagg (49.89); Rowdy Gaines (49.14)	3:19.26	Guayaquil, Ecuador	5 August 1982
Olympic record	United States; David Edgar (52.69); John Murphy (52.04); Jerry Heidenreich (50.78); Mark Spitz (50.90)	3:26.42	Munich, West Germany	28 August 1972

The following new world and Olympic records were set during this competition.

Date	Event	Name	Nationality	Time	Record
2 August	Heat 3	Neil Brooks (50.36); Greg Fasala (50.35); Michael Delany (50.03); Mark Stockwell (49.20)	Australia	3:19.94	OR
2 August	Final	Chris Cavanaugh (50.83); Mike Heath (49.60); Matt Biondi (49.67); Rowdy Gaines (48.93)	United States	3:19.03	WR

== Results ==
=== Heats ===
Rule: The eight fastest teams advance to the final (Q).

Rank	Heat	Lane	Nation	Swimmers	Time	Notes
1	3	5	Australia	Neil Brooks (50.36); Greg Fasala (50.35); Michael Delany (50.03); Mark Stockwell (49.20)	3:19.94	Q, OR
2	3	4	United States	Matt Biondi (50.50); Chris Cavanaugh (49.94); Tom Jager (49.89); Robin Leamy (49.81)	3:20.14	Q
3	2	4	Sweden	Rikard Milton (51.80); Michael Söderlund (50.98); Mikael Örn (50.89); Per Johansson (50.19)	3:23.86	Q, NR
4	3	6	Great Britain	David Lowe (51.51); Roland Lee (51.37); Paul Easter (51.03); Richard Burrell (50.68)	3:24.59	Q
5	2	5	France	Stéphan Caron (50.83); Laurent Neuville (50.84); Dominique Bataille (51.77); Bruno Lesaffre (51.24)	3:24.68	Q, NR
6	1	4	West Germany	Dirk Korthals (51.31); Alexander Schowtka (50.90); Nicolai Klapkarek (51.27); Michael Gross (51.21)	3:24.69	Q, NR
7	3	8	Italy	Marcello Guarducci (51.49); Raffaele Franceschi (51.51); Metello Savino (51.00); Marco Colombo (51.37)	3:25.37	Q, NR
8	3	3	Canada	Sandy Goss (51.82); Alex Baumann (51.14); Blair Hicken (51.23); Levente Mady (51.75)	3:25.94	Q
9	1	5	Switzerland	Dano Halsall (51.68); Stéfan Voléry (50.24); Thierry Jacot (52.33); Roger Birrer (52.36)	3:26.61	
10	2	1	Brazil	Cyro Delgado (52.10); Jorge Fernandes (51.39); Djan Madruga (52.44); Ronald Menezes (51.40)	3:27.33	
11	2	3	Netherlands	Edsard Schlingemann (51.94); Peter Drost (52.69); Frank Drost (51.59); Hans Kroes (51.38)	3:27.60	
12	1	3	Venezuela	Alberto Mestre (51.18); Alberto José Umana (53.13); Rafael Vidal (53.15); Jean-Marie François (52.78)	3:30.24	
13	2	2	Japan	Hiroshi Sakamoto (52.31); Shigeo Ogata (52.22); Taihei Saka (52.85); Satoshi Sumida (53.07)	3:30.45	
14	2	6	Puerto Rico	Fernando Cañales (51.90); Miguel Figueroa (53.63); Antonio Portela (51.92); Rafael Gandarillas (53.21)	3:30.66	
15	1	6	China	Mu Lat (52.21); Feng Dawei (52.81); Chen Qin (53.31); Shen Jianqiang (52.49)	3:30.82	
16	1	2	Mexico	José Medina (54.12); Ramiro Estrada (52.39); César Sánchez (54.05); Carlos Romo (53.30)	3:33.86	
17	3	2	Singapore	Ang Peng Siong (51.18); Oon Jin Teik (54.53); David Lim Fong Jock (54.70); Oon Jin Gee (54.22)	3:34.63	
18	1	1	Jamaica	Andrew Phillips (52.97); Deryck Marks (54.44); Allan Marsh (52.97); Gordon Scarlett (54.49)	3:34.87	
19	3	7	Turkey	Kemal Sabri Özün (53.50); İhsan Sabri Özün (53.94); Ahmed Nakkas (54.59); Gökhan Attaroglu (54.51)	3:36.54	
20	1	7	Virgin Islands	Erik Rosskopf (55.40); Brian Farlow (57.77); Collier Woolard (55.76); Scott Newkirk (54.56)	3:43.49	
21	3	1	Guatemala	Rodrigo Leal (58.39); Fernando Marroquin (58.33); Roberto Granados (58.56); Ernesto-José Degenhart (56.90)	3:52.18	
22	2	8	Honduras	Salvador Corelo (58.20); Juan José Piro (59.92); David Palma (58.66); Rodolfo Torres (59.09)	3:55.87	
	2	7	Egypt	Mohamed Youssef (53.23); Sharif Nour (55.36); Ahmed Eid; Ahmed Said	DSQ	

=== Final ===
Rank	Lane	Nation	Swimmers	Time	Notes
1st place, gold medalist(s)	5	United States	Chris Cavanaugh (50.83); Mike Heath (49.60); Matt Biondi (49.67); Rowdy Gaines (48.93)	3:19.03	WR
2nd place, silver medalist(s)	4	Australia	Greg Fasala (51.00); Neil Brooks (49.36); Michael Delany (50.26); Mark Stockwell (49.06)	3:19.68	OC
3rd place, bronze medalist(s)	3	Sweden	Thomas Lejdström (51.29); Bengt Baron (50.83); Mikael Örn (51.28); Per Johansson (49.29)	3:22.69	NR
4	7	West Germany	Dirk Korthals (51.11); Andreas Schmidt (51.48); Alexander Schowtka (50.91); Michael Gross (49.48)	3:22.98	NR
5	6	Great Britain	David Lowe (51.38); Roland Lee (51.17); Paul Easter (50.82); Richard Burrell (50.24)	3:23.61	NR
6	2	France	Stéphan Caron (51.03); Laurent Neuville (51.38); Dominique Bataille (51.17); Bruno Lesaffre (51.05)	3:24.63	NR
7	8	Canada	David Churchill (51.73); Blair Hicken (51.13); Alex Baumann (51.28); Sandy Goss (50.56)	3:24.70	NR
8	1	Italy	Marcello Guarducci (51.53); Marco Colombo (51.21); Metello Savino (51.54); Fabrizio Rampazzo (50.69)	3:24.97	NR
