= Swimming at the 1984 Summer Olympics – Men's 100 metre freestyle =

Men's 100 metre freestyle at the Games of the XXIII Olympiad
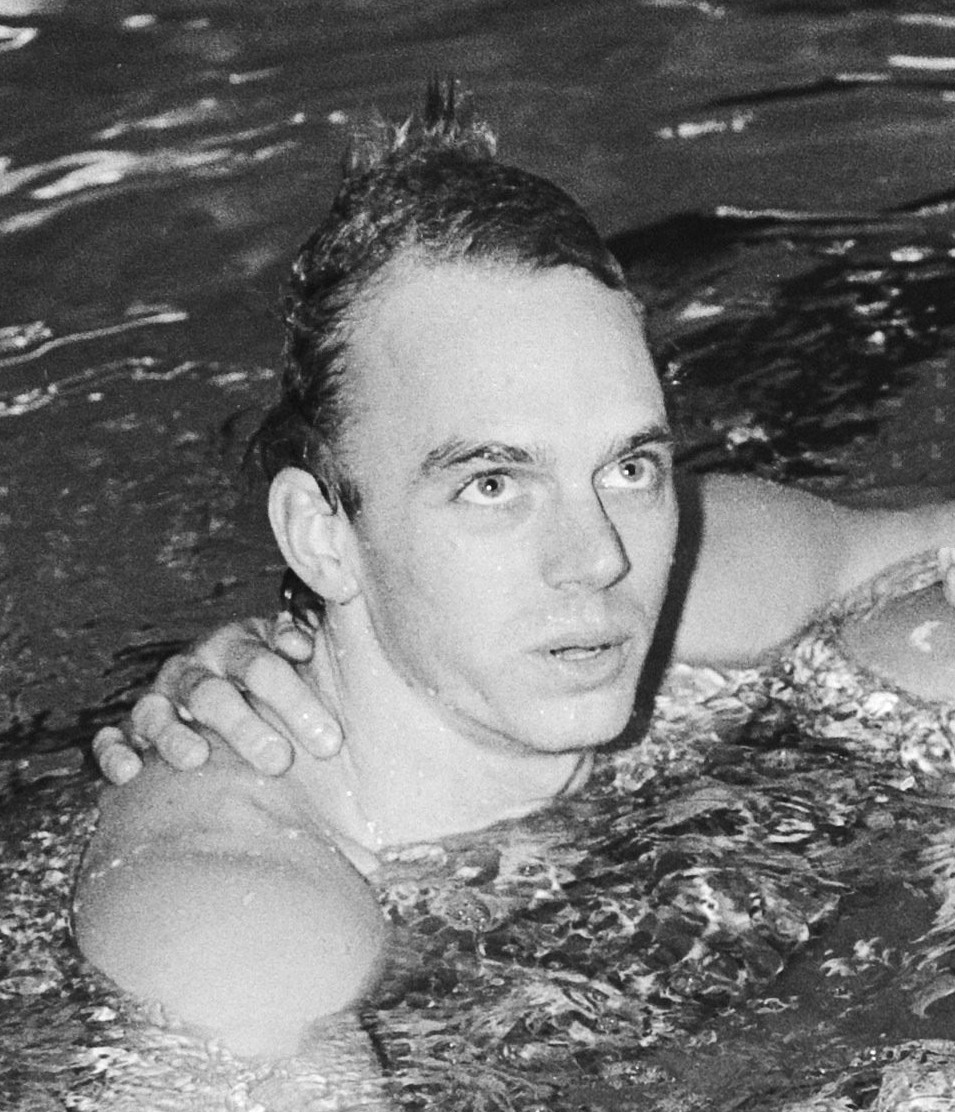
- Rowdy Gaines (1983)
- Venue: McDonald's Olympic Swim Stadium
- Date: 31 July 1984 (heats & final)
- Competitors: 68 from 45 nations
- Winning time: 49.80 OR

Medalists
1st place, gold medalist(s)		Rowdy Gaines; United States
2nd place, silver medalist(s)		Mark Stockwell; Australia
3rd place, bronze medalist(s)		Per Johansson; Sweden

The men's 100 metre freestyle event at the 1984 Summer Olympics was held in the McDonald's Olympic Swim Stadium in Los Angeles, California, on July 31, 1984. There were 68 competitors from 45 nations. Nations were limited to two swimmers each, down from three in prior Games. The event was won by Rowdy Gaines of the United States, the nation's third victory in four Games—with only the boycotted 1980 Olympics missing. Overall, it was the eleventh victory for an American in the men's 100 metre freestyle, most of any nation. Mark Stockwell of Australia took silver. Swedish swimmer Per Johansson repeated as bronze medalist, only the seventh man to earn multiple medals in the event.

== Background ==
This was the 19th appearance of the men's 100 metre freestyle. The event has been held at every Summer Olympics except 1900 (when the shortest freestyle was the 200 metres), though the 1904 version was measured in yards rather than metres.

One of the eight finalists from the 1980 Games returned: bronze medalist Per Johansson of Sweden. The reigning gold medalist, and 1982 world champion, Jörg Woithe of East Germany, was absent due to the Soviet-led boycott. World runner-up Rowdy Gaines had missed the 1980 Games due to the American-led boycott at the peak of his ability; four years later, he was still favored. Johansson had taken third at worlds.

With a large field and a reduced maximum per nation, many nations new to the event were able to compete. The Bahamas, Bahrain, the People's Republic of China, Chinese Taipei, Fiji, Honduras, the Netherlands Antilles, San Marino, Suriname, Swaziland, and Uganda each made their debut in the event. The United States made its 18th appearance, most of any nation, having missed only the boycotted 1980 Games.

== Competition format ==
This freestyle swimming competition used a new A/B final format. The competition consisted of two rounds: heats and finals. The swimmers with the best 8 times in the semifinals advanced to the A final, competing for medals through 8th place. The swimmers with the next 8 times in the semifinals competed in the B final for 9th through 16th place. Swim-offs were used as necessary to determine advancement.

== Records ==
Prior to this competition, the existing world and Olympic records were as follows.

World record	Rowdy Gaines (USA)	49.36	Austin, United States	3 April 1981
Olympic record	Jim Montgomery (USA)	49.99	Montreal, Canada	25 July 1976

The following records were established during the competition:

Date	Round	Swimmer	Nation	Time	Record
31 July	Final A	Rowdy Gaines	United States	49.80	OR

== Schedule ==
All times are Pacific Daylight Time (UTC-7)

Date	Time	Round
Tuesday, 31 July 1984	9:10; 16:35; 16:40	Heats; Final A Final B

== Results ==
=== Heats ===
Rule: The eight fastest swimmers advance to final A, while the next eight to final B.

Rank	Heat	Lane	Name	Nationality	Time	Notes
1	6	4	Mark Stockwell	Australia	50.27	Q
2	9	4	Mike Heath	United States	50.39	Q
3	8	4	Rowdy Gaines	United States	50.41	Q
4	5	3	Per Johansson	Sweden	50.57	Q
5	6	3	Dano Halsall	Switzerland	50.91	Q
6	1	4	Alberto Mestre	Venezuela	50.99	Q
7	2	3	Dirk Korthals	West Germany	51.02	Q
8	3	4	Stéphan Caron	France	51.13	Q
9	7	5	Hans Kroes	Netherlands	51.19	q
9	9	5	Thomas Lejdström	Sweden	51.19	q
11	4	4	Michael Delany	Australia	51.22	q, WD
12	2	4	Stéfan Voléry	Switzerland	51.24	q
13	8	3	Edsard Schlingemann	Netherlands	51.33	q
14	6	5	Peter Rohde	Denmark	51.40	q, NR
15	3	3	Ang Peng Siong	Singapore	51.66	q
16	4	3	David Lowe	Great Britain	51.68	q
17	8	5	Fabrizio Rampazzo	Italy	51.71	q
18	3	5	Cyro Delgado	Brazil	51.74	
19	7	4	Fernando Cañales	Puerto Rico	51.75	
20	7	3	Alexander Schowtka	West Germany	51.78	
21	1	3	Paul Easter	Great Britain	51.83	
22	9	3	David Churchill	Canada	51.85	
23	6	6	Ramiro Estrada	Mexico	52.07	
24	2	5	Franz Mortensen	Denmark	52.22	
25	1	5	Alexander Pilhatsch	Austria	52.25	
26	8	6	Marco Colombo	Italy	52.34	
27	3	6	Antonio Portela	Portugal	52.47	NR
28	4	5	Ronald Menezes	Brazil	52.49	
29	5	5	Blair Hicken	Canada	52.74	
30	4	2	Michael Miao	Chinese Taipei	52.76	NR
31	5	6	Mu Lati	China	52.82	
32	9	2	Shen Jianqiang	China	52.84	
33	4	6	Shigeo Ogata	Japan	52.96	NR
34	9	3	Mohamed Youssef	Egypt	53.19	NR
35	6	2	Kemal Sadri Özün	Turkey	53.39	
36	1	6	Li Khai-kam	Hong Kong	53.48	
37	5	4	Sean Nottage	Bahamas	53.66	
38	8	2	Fabián Ferrari	Argentina	53.69	
39	2	6	Satoshi Sumida	Japan	53.83	
40	3	2	Hilton Woods	Netherlands Antilles	53.92	
41	8	7	Lukman Niode	Indonesia	54.10	
42	1	2	Oon Jin Gee	Singapore	54.17	
43	5	2	Gökhan Attaroğlu	Turkey	54.22	
44	7	2	Fernando Rodríguez	Peru	54.61	
45	9	6	Deryck Marks	Jamaica	54.63	
45	2	7	William Wilson	Philippines	54.63	
47	3	7	Erik Rosskopf	Virgin Islands	54.80	
48	7	7	César Sánchez	Mexico	54.94	
49	6	7	Anthony Nesty	Suriname	54.99	
50	5	7	Ahmed Said	Egypt	55.01	
51	2	2	Evert Johan Kroon	Netherlands Antilles	55.20	
52	7	6	Gordon Scarlett	Jamaica	55.34	
53	4	7	Collier Woolard	Virgin Islands	55.67	
54	5	1	Samuela Tupou	Fiji	55.85	
55	1	7	Ingi Jónsson	Iceland	56.31	
56	7	1	Jean-Luc Adorno	Monaco	56.38	
57	8	1	Warren Sorby	Fiji	56.75	
58	3	1	Rodrigo Leal	Guatemala	56.80	
59	6	1	Khaled Al-Assaf	Kuwait	56.91	
60	4	1	Ernesto-José Degenhart	Guatemala	57.20	
61	8	8	Hamad Bader	Bahrain	58.16	
62	7	8	Trevor Ncala	Swaziland	58.22	
63	9	8	Michele Piva	San Marino	59.26	
64	5	8	Rodolfo Torres	Honduras	1:00.92	
65	6	8	Domingos Chivavele	Mozambique	1:01.38	
66	2	1	Percy Sayegh	Lebanon	1:01.88	
67	1	1	Rami Kantari	Lebanon	1:01.96	
68	9	1	Daniel Mulumba	Uganda	1:07.86	

=== Finals ===
==== Final B ====
Rank	Lane	Swimmer	Nation	Time	Notes
9	7	Ang Peng Siong	Singapore	51.09	NR
10	3	Stéfan Voléry	Switzerland	51.42	
11	1	David Lowe	Great Britain	51.48	
12	8	Fabrizio Rampazzo	Italy	51.56	
13	4	Hans Kroes	Netherlands	51.64	
13	5	Thomas Lejdström	Sweden	51.64	
15	6	Edsard Schlingemann	Netherlands	51.74	
16	2	Peter Rohde	Denmark	51.98	

==== Final A ====
The Australian team protested the final, requesting another race. The Americans had experience with the starter and knew he had a tendency toward a quick trigger. The Australian protest was disallowed.

Rank	Lane	Swimmer	Nation	Time	Notes
1st place, gold medalist(s)	3	Rowdy Gaines	United States	49.80	OR
2nd place, silver medalist(s)	4	Mark Stockwell	Australia	50.24	OC
3rd place, bronze medalist(s)	6	Per Johansson	Sweden	50.31	
4	5	Mike Heath	United States	50.41	
5	2	Dano Halsall	Switzerland	50.50	NR
6	7	Alberto Mestre	Venezuela	50.70	NR
6	8	Stéphan Caron	France	50.70	NR
8	1	Dirk Korthals	West Germany	50.93	
