= 1987 NCAA Men's Water Polo Championship =

Water polo tournament season

Tournament details
- Dates: December 1987
- Teams: 8

Final positions
- Champions: California (7th title)
- Runners-up: USC (2nd title game)

Tournament statistics
- Matches played: 12
- Goals scored: 234 (19.5 per match)
- Attendance: 4,398 (367 per match)
- Top goal scorer(s): Rafael Gandarillas, Pepperdine & Alexis Rousseau, UCLA (11)

Awards
- Best player: Giacomo Rossi (USC)

The 1987 NCAA Men's Water Polo Championship was the 19th annual NCAA Men's Water Polo Championship to determine the national champion of NCAA men's collegiate water polo. Tournament matches were played at the Belmont Plaza Pool in Long Beach, California during December 1987.

California defeated USC in the final, 9–8 (in one overtime), to win their seventh national title. Coached by Pete Cutino, the Golden Bears finished the season 27–3.

The Most Outstanding Player of the tournament was Giacomo Rossi (USC). An All-Tournament Team of eight players was also named.

The tournament's leading scorers, with 12 goals each, were Rafael Gandarillas (Pepperdine) and Alexis Rousseau (UCLA)

== Qualification ==
Since there has only ever been one single national championship for water polo, all NCAA men's water polo programs (whether from Division I, Division II, or Division III) were eligible. A total of 8 teams were invited to contest this championship.

Team	Appearance	Previous
Brown	9th	1986
California	14th	1986
UC Irvine	16th	1985
Navy	3rd	1986
Pepperdine	6th	1986
USC	10th	1986
Stanford	15th	1986
UCLA	16th	1986

== Bracket ==
- Site: Belmont Plaza Pool, Long Beach, California

Fifth place
Stanford	12
Pepperdine (OT)	13
Seventh place
Brown	7
Navy	6

Consolation semifinals
Brown	7
Stanford	17
Pepperdine	16
Navy	8

First round
California	18
Brown	3
UC Irvine	8
Stanford	6
UCLA	11
Pepperdine	7
USC	17
Navy	5

Championship semifinals
California	7
UC Irvine	3
UCLA	11
USC (OT)	12

Championship
California (OT)	9
USC	8
Third place
UC Irvine	13
UCLA	10

== All-tournament team ==
- Giacomo Rossi, USC (Most outstanding player)
- Jeff Brush, California
- Fernando Carsalade, UCLA
- Kirk Everist, California
- Erich Fischer, Stanford
- Keith Leggett, USC
- Sasa Poljak, Pepperdine
- Alexis Rousseau, UCLA

== See also ==
- NCAA Men's Water Polo Championship
