= Swimming at the 1984 Summer Olympics – Men's 200 metre butterfly =

Men's 200 metre butterfly at the Games of the XXIII Olympiad
- Venue: McDonald's Olympic Swim Stadium
- Date: 3 August 1984 (heats & final)
- Competitors: 38 from 28 nations
- Winning time: 1:57.04 WR

Medalists
1st place, gold medalist(s)		Jon Sieben	Australia
2nd place, silver medalist(s)		Michael Gross	West Germany
3rd place, bronze medalist(s)		Rafael Vidal	Venezuela

The final of the men's 200 metre butterfly event at the 1984 Summer Olympics was held in the McDonald's Olympic Swim Stadium in Los Angeles, California, on August 3, 1984.

== Records ==
Prior to this competition, the existing world and Olympic records were as follows.

World record	Michael Gross (FRG)	1:57.05	Rome, Italy	26 August 1983
Olympic record	Mike Bruner (USA)	1:59.23	Montreal, Canada	18 July 1976

The following records were established during the competition:

Date	Round	Name	Nation	Time	Record
3 August	Heat 5	Michael Gross	West Germany	1:58.72	OR
3 August	Final A	Jon Sieben	Australia	1:57.04	WR

== Results ==
=== Heats ===
Rule: The eight fastest swimmers advance to final A (Q), while the next eight to final B (q).

Rank	Heat	Lane	Name	Nationality	Time	Notes
1	5	4	Michael Gross	West Germany	1:58.72	Q, OR
2	5	5	Rafael Vidal	Venezuela	1:59.15	Q, AM
3	4	4	Pablo Morales	United States	1:59.19	Q
4	4	3	Jon Sieben	Australia	1:59.63	Q
5	3	5	Anthony Mosse	New Zealand	1:59.76	Q
6	3	4	Tom Ponting	Canada	1:59.78	Q
7	3	3	Peter Ward	Canada	1:59.99	Q
8	1	4	Patrick Kennedy	United States	2:00.28	Q
9	4	5	Paolo Revelli	Italy	2:00.38	q
10	2	4	Ricardo Prado	Brazil	2:00.59	q, WD
11	4	6	Taihei Saka	Japan	2:00.66	q
12	1	5	Gérard de Kort	Netherlands	2:00.83	q
13	2	5	Frank Drost	Netherlands	2:01.18	q
14	5	6	Nick Hodgson	Great Britain	2:01.64	q
15	5	3	Filiberto Colon	Puerto Rico	2:01.80	q
16	3	6	Harri Garmendia	Spain	2:02.37	q
17	1	3	Philip Hubble	Great Britain	2:02.76	q
18	3	2	Kristofer Stivenson	Greece	2:02.94	
19	4	2	Shudo Kawawa	Japan	2:03.07	
20	1	6	Théophile David	Switzerland	2:03.21	
21	2	3	Thomas Lejdström	Sweden	2:03.81	
22	2	2	Yoram Kochavy	Israel	2:04.08	
23	5	7	João Santos	Portugal	2:04.72	
24	1	2	Alberto José Umana	Venezuela	2:05.29	
25	2	6	Andreas Behrend	West Germany	2:06.06	
26	3	7	Søren Østberg	Denmark	2:06.12	
27	4	7	İhsan Sabri Özün	Turkey	2:07.45	
28	1	7	Bang Jun-young	South Korea	2:07.80	
29	2	7	Tsang Yi Ming	Hong Kong	2:08.44	
30	5	1	Andrey Aguilar	Costa Rica	2:08.74	
31	4	1	Mohamed Youssef	Egypt	2:08.88	
32	3	1	Harry Wozniak	Barbados	2:13.17	
33	1	1	Roberto Granados	Guatemala	2:13.79	
34	3	8	Juan José Piro	Honduras	2:22.80	
35	5	8	Juan Miranda Trejo	El Salvador	2:38.32	
	2	1	Ahmed Said	Egypt	DNS	
	4	8	Marcelo Jucá	Brazil	DNS	
	5	2	Fabrizio Rampazzo	Italy	DNS	

=== Finals ===
==== Final B ====
Rank	Lane	Name	Nationality	Time	Notes
9	5	Taihei Saka	Japan	2:00.31	NR
10	6	Frank Drost	Netherlands	2:01.23	
11	2	Nick Hodgson	Great Britain	2:01.24	
12	7	Filiberto Colon	Puerto Rico	2:01.27	
13	3	Gérard de Kort	Netherlands	2:01.30	
14	4	Paolo Revelli	Italy	2:01.58	
15	1	Harri Garmendia	Spain	2:01.82	
16	8	Philip Hubble	Great Britain	2:03.06	

==== Final A ====
Rank	Lane	Name	Nationality	Time	Notes
1st place, gold medalist(s)	6	Jon Sieben	Australia	1:57.04	WR
2nd place, silver medalist(s)	4	Michael Gross	West Germany	1:57.40	
3rd place, bronze medalist(s)	5	Rafael Vidal	Venezuela	1:57.51	AM
4	3	Pablo Morales	United States	1:57.75	NR
5	2	Anthony Mosse	New Zealand	1:58.75	NR
6	7	Tom Ponting	Canada	1:59.37	
7	1	Peter Ward	Canada	2:00.39	
8	8	Patrick Kennedy	United States	2:01.03	
