= 1985 NCAA Men's Water Polo Championship =

Water polo tournament season

Tournament details
- Dates: December 1985
- Teams: 8

Final positions
- Champions: Stanford (5th title)
- Runners-up: UC Irvine (6th title game)

Tournament statistics
- Matches played: 12
- Goals scored: 227 (18.92 per match)
- Attendance: 3,410 (284 per match)
- Top goal scorer(s): J.R. Salvatore, UC Irvine (10)

Awards
- Best player: Jeff Campbell, UC Irvine; David Imbernino, Stanford

The 1985 NCAA Men's Water Polo Championship was the 17th annual NCAA Men's Water Polo Championship to determine the national champion of NCAA men's collegiate water polo. Tournament matches were played at the Belmont Plaza Pool in Long Beach, California during December 1985.

Stanford defeated UC Irvine in the final, 12–11 (in two overtimes), to win their fifth national title. This was a rematch of the 1982 championship match, won by UC Irvine. Coached by Dante Dettamanti, the Cardinal finished the season 25–4.

Jeff Campbell (UC Irvine) and David Imbernino (Stanford) were named the Most Outstanding Players of the tournament. An All-Tournament Team, consisting of eight players, was also named.

The tournament's leading scorer was J.R. Salvatore from UC Irvine (10 goals).

== Qualification ==
Since there has only ever been one single national championship for water polo, all NCAA men's water polo programs (whether from Division I, Division II, or Division III) were eligible. A total of 8 teams were invited to contest this championship.

Team	Appearance	Previous
Brown	7th	1984
Bucknell	5th	1980
UC Irvine	15th	1983
UC Santa Barbara	11th	1982
Long Beach State	8th	1983
Loyola–Chicago	10th	1984
Stanford	13th	1984
UCLA	14th	1984

== Bracket ==
- Site: Belmont Plaza Pool, Long Beach, California

Fifth place
Long Beach State	13
Brown	9
Seventh place
Bucknell	8
Loyola–Chicago	6

Consolation semifinals
Bucknell	4
Long Beach State	20
Brown	11
Loyola–Chicago	10

First round
Stanford	18
Bucknell	4
UC Santa Barbara	7
Long Beach State	6
UC Irvine	15
Brown	8
UCLA	14
Loyola–Chicago	6

Championship semifinals
Stanford	7
UC Santa Barbara	6
UC Irvine	7
UCLA	6

Championship
Stanford (2OT)	12
UC Irvine	11
Third place
UC Santa Barbara	9
UCLA	10

== All-tournament team ==
- Jeff Campbell, UC Irvine (Co-Most outstanding player)
- David Imbernino, Stanford (Co-Most outstanding player)
- (Canada) John Anderson, UC Santa Barbara
- Fernando Carsalade, UCLA
- Phil Castillo, Long Beach State
- Craig Klass, Stanford
- Mark Maizel, UC Irvine
- J.R. Salvatore, UC Irvine

== See also ==
- NCAA Men's Water Polo Championship
