= 1986 NCAA Men's Water Polo Championship =

Water polo tournament season

Tournament details
- Dates: December 1986
- Teams: 8

Final positions
- Champions: Stanford (6th title)
- Runners-up: California (10th title game)

Tournament statistics
- Matches played: 12
- Goals scored: 230 (19.17 per match)
- Attendance: 3,491 (291 per match)
- Top goal scorer(s): Robert Lynn, USC (12)

Awards
- Best player: Fernando Carsalade, UCLA); David Imbernino, Stanford); Craig Klass, Stanford)

The 1986 NCAA Men's Water Polo Championship was the 18th annual NCAA Men's Water Polo Championship to determine the national champion of NCAA men's collegiate water polo. Tournament matches were played at the Belmont Plaza Pool in Long Beach, California during December 1986.

Stanford defeated rival California in the final, 9–6, to win their sixth national title. Coached by Dante Dettamanti, the Cardinal finished the season undefeated, 36–0.

The Most Outstanding Players of the tournament were Fernando Carsalade (UCLA), David Imbernino (Stanford), and Craig Klass (Stanford). An All-Tournament Team of eight players was also named.

The tournament's leading scorer was Robert Lynn from USC (12 goals).

== Qualification ==
Since there has only ever been one single national championship for water polo, all NCAA men's water polo programs (whether from Division I, Division II, or Division III) were eligible. A total of 8 teams were invited to contest this championship.

Team	Appearance	Previous
Air Force	5th	1981
Brown	8th	1985
California	13th	1984
Navy	2nd	1984
Pepperdine	5th	1984
USC	9th	1984
Stanford	14th	1985
UCLA	15th	1985

== Bracket ==
- Site: Belmont Plaza Pool, Long Beach, California

Fifth place
USC	8
Navy	3
Seventh place
Air Force	13
Brown	19

Consolation semifinals
Air Force	3
USC	13
Brown	4
Navy	6

First round
Stanford	23
Air Force	5
Pepperdine	10
USC	9
California	11
Brown	4
UCLA	13
Navy	7

Championship semifinals
Stanford	15
Pepperdine	8
California	11
UCLA	8

Championship
Stanford	9
California	6
Third place
Pepperdine	11
UCLA	12

== All-tournament team ==
- Fernando Carsalade, UCLA (Co-Most outstanding player)
- David Imbernino, Stanford (Co-Most outstanding player)
- Craig Klass, Stanford (Co-Most outstanding player)
- Jeff Brush, California
- Kirk Everist, California
- Erich Fischer, Stanford
- Robert Lynn, USC
- Bill Schoening, California

== See also ==
- NCAA Men's Water Polo Championship
