= Swimming at the 1983 Pan American Games – Men's 100 metre freestyle =

Men's 100 metre freestyle at the 1983 Pan American Games
- Venue: -
- Dates: August 19 (preliminaries and finals)
- Competitors: from - nations

Medalists
| Gold medal | Rowdy Gaines | United States |
| Silver medal | Fernando Cañales | Puerto Rico |
| Bronze medal | Alberto Mestre | Venezuela |

The men's 100 metre freestyle competition of the swimming events at the 1983 Pan American Games took place on 19 August. The last Pan American Games champion was David McCagg of US.

This race consisted of two lengths of the pool, both lengths being in freestyle.

== Results ==
All times are in minutes and seconds.

| KEY: | q | Fastest non-qualifiers | Q | Qualified | GR | Games record | NR | National record | PB | Personal best | SB | Seasonal best |

=== Heats ===
The first round was held on August 19.

| Rank | Name | Nationality | Time | Notes |
|---|---|---|---|---|
| 1 | Rowdy Gaines | United States | 50.09 | Q, GR |
| - | Alberto Mestre | Venezuela | 50.95 | Q, SA |
| - | - | - | - | Q |
| - | - | - | - | Q |
| - | - | - | - | Q |
| - | - | - | - | Q |
| - | - | - | - | Q |
| - | - | - | - | Q |

=== Final ===
The final was held on August 19.

| Rank | Name | Nationality | Time | Notes |
|---|---|---|---|---|
| 1st place, gold medalist(s) | Rowdy Gaines | United States | 50.38 | |
| 2nd place, silver medalist(s) | Fernando Cañales | Puerto Rico | 50.43 | AR |
| 3rd place, bronze medalist(s) | Alberto Mestre | Venezuela | 51.09 | |
| 4 | Chris Cavanaugh | United States | 51.17 | |
| 5 | Cyro Delgado | Brazil | 52.09 | |
| 6 | Jorge Fernandes | Brazil | 52.52 | |
| 7 | Dave Churchill | Canada | 52.57 | |
| 8 | Antonio Portela | Puerto Rico | 52.96 | |
