= Bids for the 2018 Commonwealth Games =

Overview
- XXI Commonwealth Games
- Winner: Gold Coast, Queensland; Runner-up: Hambantota

Details
- Committee: CGF

Map
- Location of the bidding cities

Important dates
- Bid: 31 March 2010
- Decision: 11 November 2011

Decision
- Winner: Gold Coast, Queensland (43 votes)
- Runner-up: Hambantota (27 votes)

Bidding for the 2018 Commonwealth Games began on 31 March 2010. The winning bid was announced in Basseterre, Saint Kitts on 11 November 2011. Gold Coast won its bid to host the 2018 Commonwealth Games.

== Bidding Process ==
=== Bidding Timeline ===
- 2010

31 March 2010 – Deadline for CGA's/Candidate Cities to notify of intention to bid
16 April 2010 – Payment of Candidate City Fee for assessment and support of lodgement of original copy of Candidate Procedure Acceptance
Last week April 2010 – Meeting of all Candidate Cities in London
30 June 2010 – Signed return of Host City Contracts in London
October 2010 – Candidate City Observers Program in Delhi
November/December 2010 – Delhi 2010 Debriefing and Candidate City Seminar in Delhi

- 2011

February 2011 – CGF- Candidate City Meeting
11 May 2011 – Bid Lodging Deadline
June/July 2011 – Evaluation commission visits Candidate City
September 2011 – Publishing of Evaluation Report in London
October 2011 – Deadline for Candidate City Bid Changes in London
11 November 2011 – Bid Election in Basseterre, Saint Kitts and Nevis

=== Vote ===
On 11 November 2011, Gold Coast won its bid to host the Commonwealth Games.

2018 Commonwealth Games bidding results
City	Country	Votes
Gold Coast	Australia	43
Hambantota	Sri Lanka	27

== Cities that were considered ==
Two cities submitted bids to host the 2018 Commonwealth Games that were recognised by the CGF. The two cities were Gold Coast (Australia) and Hambantota (Sri Lanka).

City	Country	Commonwealth Games Committee	Result
Gold Coast	Australia	Australian Commonwealth Games Association (ACGA)	Winner
Further information: Gold Coast bid for the 2018 Commonwealth Games On 22 August 2008, the Premier of Queensland, Anna Bligh, officially launched the Gold Coast's bid to host the Commonwealth Games in 2018. Ron Clarke, a medallist at both Commonwealth and Olympic Games and present Mayor of the Gold Coast, is expected to take a key role in promoting the bid. On 7 April 2009, the ABC reported a land exchange deal between the City of Gold Coast and State of Queensland for Carrara Stadium. According to Mayor Ron Clarke the land will aid a potential bid for the 2018 Commonwealth Games. The land exchanged would be used as the site of an aquatics centre. In the same article Mayor Clarke raised the question of the Australian Federal Government's commitment to a 2018 Commonwealth Games Bid in light of the Government's support for Australia's 2018 FIFA World Cup Finals bid. On 16 April 2009, Queensland Premier Anna Bligh told reporters that a successful Commonwealth Games bid by the Gold Coast could help the tourist strip win a role in hosting the World Cup. "Some of the infrastructure that would be built for the Commonwealth Games will be useful for the Gold Coast to get a World Cup game out of the soccer World Cup if we're successful as a nation," she said. However the decision on the 2018 and 2022 Fifa World Cups will come 11 months prior to the bid decision for the 2018 Commonwealth Games, so the potential World Cup venues will already have been chosen. On 3 June 2009, the Gold Coast was confirmed as Australia's exclusive bidder vying for the 2018 Commonwealth Games. "Should a bid proceed, the Gold Coast will have the exclusive Australian rights to bid as host city for 2018," Premier Anna Bligh stated., Recently I met with the president and CEO of the Australian Commonwealth Games Association and we agreed to commission a full and comprehensive feasibility study into the potential for the 2018 Commonwealth Games," she said. "Under the stewardship of Queensland Events new chair, Mr Geoff Dixon, that study is now well advanced." On 15 March 2010, it was announced that the Queensland Government will provide initial funding of A$11 million for the 2018 Commonwealth Games bid. The Premier of Queensland has indicated the Government's support for the bid to the Australian Commonwealth Games Association. On 31 March 2010, the Australian Commonwealth Games Association officially launched the bid to host the 2018 Commonwealth Games. In October 2011, Gold Coast Mayor Ron Clarke stated that the games would provide a strong legacy for the city after the games have ended. Australia also hosted the games in 1938, 1962, 1982 and 2006 at Sydney, Perth, Brisbane and Melbourne respectively.
Hambantota	Sri Lanka	National Olympic Committee of Sri Lanka	First runner-up
Further information: Hambantota bid for the 2018 Commonwealth Games Hambantota 2018 is one of two bids to stage the 2018 Commonwealth Games, first recognised by the Commonwealth Games Federation (CGF) on 31 March 2010. On 31 March 2010, a surprise bid was made for the 2018 Commonwealth Games by the Sri Lankan city of Hambantota. Hambantota was devastated by the 2004 Indian Ocean tsunami and there is a major face lift going in the city of Hambantota. The first phase of the Port of Hambantota is nearing completion and it is funded by the government of China. The Mattala International Airport, which is the second international Airport of Sri Lanka is built close to Hambantota.The bid for the commonwealth games is line with GOSL decision to develop Hambantota as a sports hub. Also a new Hambantota International Cricket Stadium has been built, and has hosted matches in the 2011 Cricket World Cup. If Sri Lanka wins the bid to host the games, it promises to have all the venues built by December 2016, with 2017 being used for test events. All the venues would be clustered in the same area except a couple of venues. Sri Lanka's recent win to stage the 2011 South Asian Beach Games and hosting of the 2011 Cricket World Cup in Hambantota, is said to strengthen the bid. On 31 January 2011 the logo was launched for the bid.

=== Proposed bids which did not go to application ===
These cities launched bids or indicated interest, but ultimately did not bid .

- Adelaide, Australia

State Opposition Leader Martin Hamilton-Smith committed to a bid for the 2018 Commonwealth Games if the Liberals were elected in 2010. However, the bid would have needed to be made before the poll. The government ruled the option out, with the then treasurer, Kevin Foley, labeling the Commonwealth games a "B" grade event. On 28 November 2008, Adelaide withdrew, with State Sport Minister Michael Wright blaming budgetary pressures. Projects such as Marjorie Jackson-Nelson Hospital (since renamed to the new Royal Adelaide Hospital, the desalination plant, and transport were deemed more pressing.

- Perth, Australia

Perth confirmed in 2009 that it would not pursue a bid to hold the games in 2018.

- Abuja, Nigeria

Abuja previously bid for the 2014 Commonwealth Games, and finished as runners-up. They also announced an intention to bid for 2018, but did not do so at the deadline.

- Auckland, New Zealand

Auckland's bid to stage the 2018 Commonwealth Games ended when the government of New Zealand announced they would not provide financial support to stage the games. The Prime Minister of New Zealand, John Key confirmed that the government would not back Auckland's bid. Key said that the issue was not the cost of the bid itself, but how much it would cost to run the event. He said New Zealand would face a NZ$600 million loss, even taking into account benefits such as increased tourism, if it were to go ahead.

- Christchurch, New Zealand

According to a 2009 report by Radio New Zealand, Christchurch City Council withdrew from bidding for the 2018 games.

- Port of Spain, Trinidad and Tobago

Port of Spain launched a bid, but ultimately the Trinidad and Tobago Commonwealth Games Association decided not to proceed with the process. The country later won the right to host the 2021 Commonwealth Youth Games in the same city.
