= Guatemala at the 1984 Summer Olympics =

- IOC code: GUA
- NOC: Guatemalan Olympic Committee

in Los Angeles
- Competitors: 24 (20 men, 4 women) in 9 sports
- Flag bearer: Oswaldo Méndez
- Medals: Gold 0 Silver 0 Bronze 0 Total 0

Summer Olympics appearances (overview)
- 1952; 1956–1964; 1968; 1972; 1976; 1980; 1984; 1988; 1992; 1996; 2000; 2004; 2008; 2012; 2016; 2020; 2024

Guatemala competed at the 1984 Summer Olympics in Los Angeles, United States. 24 competitors, 20 men and 4 women, took part in 40 events in 9 sports.

== Athletics ==
Men's 400 metres

- Alberto López

- Heat — 52.21 (→ did not advance)

Men's Decathlon

- Ángel Estu Díaz

- Final Result — 6342 points (→ 24th place)

Men's 20 km Walk

- José Victor Alonzo

- Final — 1:35:32 (→ 34th place)

Men's 50 km Walk

- José Víctor Alonzo

- Final — 4:36:35 (→ 17th place)

- Christa Shuman
- Patricia Meighan
- Vladimir Samayoa
- Hugo Allan García

== Boxing ==
Men's Light Flyweight (– 48 kg)

- Carlos Motta

- First Round — Defeated Mustafa Genç (TUR), 5:0
- Second Round — Defeated Daniel Mwangi (KEN), 4:1
- Quarterfinals — Lost to Marcelino Bolivar (VEN), 0:5

== Cycling ==
One cyclists represented Guatemala in 1984.

1000m time trial

- Max Leiva

== Swimming ==
Men's 100m Freestyle

- Rodrigo Leal

- Heat — 56.80 (→ did not advance, 58th place)

- Ernesto-José Degenhart

- Heat — 57.20 (→ did not advance, 60th place)

Men's 200m Freestyle

- Roberto Granados

- Heat — 2:05.21 (→ did not advance, 50th place)

- Rodrigo Leal

- Heat — 2:05.96 (→ did not advance, 51st place)

Men's 100m Backstroke

- Ernesto-José Degenhart

- Heat — 1:05.63 (→ did not advance, 39th place)

Men's 200m Backstroke

- Ernesto-José Degenhart

- Heat — 2:24.08 (→ did not advance, 33rd place)

Men's 100m Breaststroke

- Fernando Marroquin

- Heat — 1:09.73 (→ did not advance, 44th place)

Men's 200m Breaststroke

- Fernando Marroquin

- Heat — 2:35.21 (→ did not advance, 40th place)

Men's 100m Butterfly

- Roberto Granados

- Heat — 1:02.32 (→ did not advance, 44th place)

Men's 200m Butterfly

- Roberto Granados

- Heat — 2:13.79 (→ did not advance, 32nd place)

Men's 200m Individual Medley

- Roberto Granados

- Heat — 2:22.73 (→ did not advance, 38th place)

Men's 4 × 100 m Freestyle Relay

- Rodrigo Leal, Fernando Marroquin, Roberto Granados, and Ernesto-José Degenhart

- Heat — 3:52.18 (→ did not advance, 21st place)

Men's 4 × 100 m Medley Relay

- Ernesto José Degenhart, Fernando Marroquin, Roberto Granados, and Rodrigo Leal

- Heat — 4:16.94 (→ did not advance, 19th place)

Women's 100m Freestyle

- Blanca Morales

- Heat — 1:02.48 (→ did not advance, 37th place)

- Karen Slowing

- Heat — 1:03.46 (→ did not advance, 41st place)

Women's 200m Freestyle

- Karen Slowing

- Heat — 2:14.39 (→ did not advance, 31st place)

- Blanca Morales

- Heat — 2:14.79 (→ did not advance, 32nd place)

Women's 400m Freestyle

- Karen Slowing

- Heat — 4:36.87 (→ did not advance, 23rd place)

Women's 800m Freestyle

- Karen Slowing

- Heat — 9:20.68 (→ did not advance, 19th place)

Women's 200m Butterfly

- Blanca Morales

- Heat — 2:25.03 (→ did not advance, 28th place)

Women's 200m Individual Medley

- Blanca Morales

- Heat — 2:38.16 (→ did not advance, 27th place)

== Weightlifting ==
Men's bantamweight

- Nery Minchez (15th)

Men's lightweight

- Antulio Delgado (not placed)
