= 1984 NCAA Men's Water Polo Championship =

Water polo tournament season

Tournament details
- Dates: December 1984
- Teams: 8

Final positions
- Champions: California (6th title)
- Runners-up: Stanford (6th title game)

Tournament statistics
- Matches played: 12
- Goals scored: 235 (19.58 per match)
- Attendance: 3,214 (268 per match)
- Top goal scorer(s): Alan Gresham, California (11); Charlie Harris, USC (11)

Awards
- Best player: Mike Grier, Pepperdine

The 1984 NCAA Men's Water Polo Championship was the 16th annual NCAA Men's Water Polo Championship to determine the national champion of NCAA men's collegiate water polo. Tournament matches were played at the Belmont Plaza Pool in Long Beach, California during December 1984.

California defeated Stanford in the final, 9–8, to win their sixth national title. Coached by Pete Cutino, the Golden Bears finished the season 26–4–1.

Mike Grier (Pepperdine) was named the Most Outstanding Player of the tournament. An All-Tournament Team, consisting of seven players, was also named.

The tournament's leading scorers were Alan Gresham (California) and Charlie Harris (USC), with 11 goals each.

== Qualification ==
Since there has only ever been one single national championship for water polo, all NCAA men's water polo programs (whether from Division I, Division II, or Division III) were eligible. A total of 8 teams were invited to contest this championship.

Team	Appearance	Previous
Brown	6th	1983
California	12th	1983
Loyola–Chicago	9th	1983
Navy	1st	Never
Pepperdine	4th	1980
USC	8th	1983
Stanford	12th	1982
UCLA	13th	1983

== Bracket ==
- Site: Belmont Plaza Pool, Long Beach, California

Fifth place
UCLA	11
Brown	10
Seventh place
Navy	7
Loyola–Chicago	10

Consolation semifinals
Navy	4
UCLA	17
Loyola–Chicago	5
Brown	11

First round
Stanford	16
Navy	8
Pepperdine	12
UCLA	11
California	11
Loyola–Chicago	3
USC	12
Brown	11

Championship semifinals
Stanford	11
Pepperdine	6
California	10
USC	9

Championship
Stanford	8
California	9
Third place
Pepperdine	10
USC	13

== All-tournament team ==
- Mike Grier, Pepperdine (Most outstanding player)
- Shaun Cleary, California
- Eric Davidson, USC
- Alan Gresham, California
- Charlie Harris, USC
- Craig Klass, Stanford
- Mike Spicer, USC

== See also ==
- NCAA Men's Water Polo Championship
