= 1983 NCAA Men's Water Polo Championship =

Water polo tournament season

Tournament details
- Dates: December 1983
- Teams: 8

Final positions
- Champions: California (5th title)
- Runners-up: USC (1st title game)

Tournament statistics
- Matches played: 12
- Goals scored: 205 (17.08 per match)
- Attendance: 2,697 (225 per match)
- Top goal scorer(s): Dan O'Connell, Loyola–Chicago (11)

Awards
- Best player: Jeff Campbell, UC Irvine; Peter Cutino, California; Alan Gresham, California

The 1983 NCAA Men's Water Polo Championship was the 15th annual NCAA Men's Water Polo Championship to determine the national champion of NCAA men's college water polo. Tournament matches were played at the Belmont Plaza Pool in Long Beach, California during December 1983.

California defeated USC in the final, 10–7, to win their fifth national title. Coached by Pete Cutino, the Golden Bears finished the season 29–3–2.

Jeff Campbell (UC Irvine), Peter Cutino (California), and Alan Gresham (California) were named the Co-Most Outstanding Players of the tournament. An All-Tournament Team, consisting of eight players, was also named.

The tournament's leading scorer was Dan O'Connell from Loyola–Chicago (11 goals).

== Qualification ==
Since there has only ever been one single national championship for water polo, all NCAA men's water polo programs (whether from Division I, Division II, or Division III) were eligible. A total of 8 teams were invited to contest this championship. Nonetheless, Slippery Rock became the first team from outside Division I to qualify for the championship tournament.

Team	Appearance	Previous
Brown	5th	1982
California	11th	1982
UC Irvine	14th	1982
Long Beach State	7th	1981
Loyola–Chicago	8th	1982
Slippery Rock	1st	Never
USC	7th	1982
UCLA	12th	1982

== Bracket ==
- Site: Belmont Plaza Pool, Long Beach, California

Fifth place
UCLA	9
Brown	3
Seventh place
Slippery Rock	5
Loyola–Chicago	12

Consolation semifinals
Slippery Rock	4
UCLA	15
Brown (2OT)	13
Loyola–Chicago	11

First round
California	15
Slippery Rock	2
Long Beach State (2OT)	10
UCLA	8
USC	12
Brown	4
UC Irvine	12
Loyola–Chicago	8

Championship semifinals
California	8
Long Beach State	5
USC	9
UC Irvine	8

Championship
California	10
USC	7
Third place
Long Beach State	9
UC Irvine	6

== All-tournament team ==
- Jeff Campbell, UC Irvine (Co-Most outstanding player)
- Peter Cutino, California (Co-Most outstanding player)
- Alan Gresham, California (Co-Most outstanding player)
- Jim Birdsell, Long Beach State
- Shaun Cleary, California
- Mike Evans, UC Irvine
- Dan O'Connell, Loyola–Chicago
  - Note: O'Connell was the only player from a team outside the state of California to be named to an all-tournament team during its 8-team format
- Mike Spicer, USC

== See also ==
- NCAA Men's Water Polo Championship
