= Chris Cavanaugh =

Chris Cavanaugh may refer to:

- Christine Cavanaugh (1963–2014), voice actress
- Chris Cavanaugh (swimmer) (born 1962), Olympic champion swimmer
