= Alberto Mestre =

Alberto Mestre may refer to:

- Alberto Mestre (swimmer, born 1964)
- Alberto Mestre (swimmer, born 1999)
