= Turkey at the 1984 Summer Olympics =

- IOC code: TUR
- NOC: Turkish National Olympic Committee

in Los Angeles
- Competitors: 46 in 10 sports
- Flag bearer: Mehmet Yurdadön
- Medals Ranked 40th: Gold 0 Silver 0 Bronze 3 Total 3

Summer Olympics appearances (overview)
- 1908; 1912; 1920; 1924; 1928; 1932; 1936; 1948; 1952; 1956; 1960; 1964; 1968; 1972; 1976; 1980; 1984; 1988; 1992; 1996; 2000; 2004; 2008; 2012; 2016; 2020; 2024

Other related appearances
- 1906 Intercalated Games

Turkey competed at the 1984 Summer Olympics in Los Angeles, United States. The nation returned to the Summer Games after participating in the American-led boycott of the 1980 Summer Olympics. 46 competitors, 45 men and 1 woman, took part in 49 events in 10 sports.

== Medalists ==
Medal	Name	Sport	Event	Date
Bronze	Eyüp Can	Boxing	Men's flyweight	9 August
Bronze	Turgut Aykaç	Boxing	Men's featherweight	9 August
Bronze	Ayhan Taşkın	Wrestling	Men's freestyle +100 kg	10 August

== Archery ==
In its first Olympic archery competition, Turkey was represented by two men.

Men's Individual Competition:

- Kemal Erer — 2386 points (→ 40th place)
- Izzet Avçi — 2361 points (→ 45th place)

== Athletics ==
Men
Track & road events

Athlete	Event	Heat		Quarterfinal		Semifinal		Final	
Athlete	Event	Result	Rank	Result	Rank	Result	Rank	Result	Rank
Necdet Ayaz	5000 m	14:36.89	11	did not advance					
Mehmet Terzi	Marathon	—N/a						2:14:20	16
Ahmet Altun	Marathon	—N/a						DNF	—N/a
Mehmet Yurdadön	Marathon	—N/a						DNF	—N/a

Women
Track & road events

Athlete	Event	Heat		Quarterfinal		Semifinal		Final	
Athlete	Event	Result	Rank	Result	Rank	Result	Rank	Result	Rank
Semra Aksu	100 m	11.86s	6	did not advance					

== Boxing ==
Men's Light Flyweight (– 48 kg)

- Mustafa Genç

- First Round — Lost to Carlos Motta (GUA), 0:5

Men's Bantamweight (– 54 kg)

- Çemal Öner

- First Round — Bye
- Second Round — Defeated Bararq Bahtobe (CIV), 4-1
- Third Round — Lost to Pedro Decima (ARG), 1-4

== Fencing ==
Two fencers, both men, represented Turkey in 1984.

Men's foil

- Haluk Yamaç

Men's épée

- Ali Murat Dizioğlu

== Swimming ==
Men's 100m Freestyle

- Kemal Sabri Özün

- Heat — 53.39 (→ did not advance, 35th place)

- Gökhan Attaroglu

- Heat — 54.22 (→ did not advance, 43rd place)

Men's 200m Freestyle

- Gökhan Attaroglu

- Heat — 1:55.92 (→ did not advance, 32nd place)

Men's 400m Freestyle

- Ahmet Nakkas

- Heat — 4:07.07 (→ did not advance, 29th place)

- Gökhan Attaroglu

- Heat — 54.22 (→ did not advance, 30th place)

Men's 1500m Freestyle

- Ahmet Nakkas

- Heat — DNS (→ did not advance, no ranking)

Men's 100m Butterfly

- Ihsan Sadri Özün

- Heat — 56.55 (→ did not advance, 24th place)

- Kemal Sadri Özün

- Heat — 57.75 (→ did not advance, 35th place)

Men's 200m Butterfly

- Ihsan Sadri Özün

- Heat — 2:07.45 (→ did not advance, 26th place)

Men's 200m Individual Medley

- Gökhan Attaroglu

- Heat — DSQ (→ did not advance, no ranking)

Men's 4 × 100 m Freestyle Relay

- Kemal Sadri Özün, Ihsan Sadri Özün, Ahmed Nakkas, and Gökhan Attaroglu

- Heat — 3:36.54 (→ did not advance, 19th place)

Men's 4 × 200 m Freestyle Relay

- Gökhan Attaroglu, Kemal Sabri Özün, Ahmed Nakkas, and Ihsan Sadri Özün

- Heat — 7:59.36 (→ did not advance, 12th place)
