= Mark Stockwell =

Australian swimmer (born 1963)

Personal information
- Full name: Mark William Stockwell
- National team: Australia
- Born: 5 July 1963 (age 63) Brisbane, Queensland
- Height: 1.96 m (6 ft 5 in)
- Weight: 88 kg (194 lb)

Sport
- Sport: Swimming
- Strokes: Freestyle
- College team: University of Florida
Medal record
Men's swimming
Representing Australia
Olympic Games
Silver medal – second place	1984 Los Angeles	100 m freestyle
Silver medal – second place	1984 Los Angeles	4×100 m freestyle
Bronze medal – third place	1984 Los Angeles	4×100 m medley
Pan Pacific Championships
Bronze medal – third place	1985 Tokyo	50 m freestyle
Commonwealth Games
Gold medal – first place	1986 Edinburgh	4×100 m freestyle

Mark William Stockwell (born 5 July 1963) is an Australian former competition swimmer and three-time Olympic silver medallist. Stockwell is a Queensland native who specialised in freestyle sprint events, and had a successful international swimming career during the mid-1980s including the Olympics, Pan Pacific Championships, and Commonwealth Games. Following his retirement from competitive swimming, he has become a successful business executive and has been active in the administration of national sports organisations in Australia.

== Early years and education ==
Stockwell was born and raised in Brisbane, Queensland, the son of Bill and Necia Stockwell. He is a 1980 graduate of St Laurence's College, a Roman Catholic boys' high school in Brisbane. Stockwell was an Australian Institute of Sport scholarship holder from 1982 to 1984, and again in 1987. He undertook commerce and engineering studies at the University of Queensland, and economics coursework at the Australian National University. He also attended the University of Florida in the United States.

== Swimming career ==
Stockwell won three medals at the 1984 Summer Olympics in Los Angeles. In the men's 100-metre freestyle, Stockwell finished in 50.24 seconds and claimed a silver medal behind American swimmer Rowdy Gaines's Olympic record time of 49.80 seconds. The outcome was controversial, however, because of a premature starter gun and a quick start by Gaines. Gaines's coach, Richard Quick, knew of starter Frank Silvestri's tendency to fire the starter gun almost immediately when the competitors mounted the blocks; as a result Gaines gained about a metre's head start on the competition, and held Stockwell off to claim the gold medal. Video of the event confirmed that Stockwell had not been set when the starter pulled the trigger. Stockwell and the Australian Olympic Federation lodged an official protest, but it was denied.

Stockwell, along with teammates Greg Fasala, Neil Brooks, and Michael Delany, won another silver medal in the men's 4×100-metre freestyle relay, finishing in 3:19.68 – just 0.63 of a second behind the Americans' new world record of 3:19.05. He also teamed up with Mark Kerry (backstroke), Peter Evans (breaststroke), and Glenn Buchanan (butterfly), swimming the freestyle anchor leg to win the bronze medal in the 4×100-metre medley relay (3:43.25) behind the Americans (3:39.30) and Canadians (3:43.25). He and his freestyle relay teammates were dubbed the "Mean Machine" by the Australian media. Stockwell was the only Australian athlete to win three Olympic medals in 1984.

After the Olympics, Stockwell attended the University of Florida in Gainesville, Florida, United States, where he swam for the Florida Gators swimming and diving team under coach Randy Reese during the 1984–85 school year. He won three Southeastern Conference titles (50- and 100-yard freestyle, 400-yard freestyle relay), and received All-American honours in each of the three events. While attending the university he dated his future wife, fellow Gators swimmer Tracy Caulkins, whom he had met in the warm-up pool at the 1984 Olympics.

He followed his Olympic performance with a bronze medal for his third-place finish in the 50-metre freestyle (23.44), and a fourth in the 100-metre freestyle (51.64) at the 1985 Pan Pacific Championships in Tokyo. By the time the 1986 Commonwealth Games were held in Edinburgh, Stockwell had fallen back from his Olympic times in Los Angeles. He claimed a gold medal with his Australian teammates Fasala, Matthew Renshaw, and Neil Brooks in the 4×100-metre relay (3:21.58), and finished seventh in the 100-metre freestyle (51.61). He retired from competitive swimming in 1986. In December 1989, The Age newspaper recognised Stockwell as one of the three best Australian swimmers of the 1980s.

== Life after swimming ==
Stockwell married American swimmer Tracy Caulkins, a three-time Olympic gold medallist, in 1991 in her hometown of Nashville, Tennessee. The couple live in Brisbane with their five children. He received an Australian Sports Medal for his swimming achievements in 2000, and was inducted into the Queensland Sport Hall of Fame in 2009.

Stockwell is the managing director of the family-owned and Queensland-based property development, investment, and management firm, W. A. Stockwell Pty Ltd. He and his brother-in-law Mike Kelso are co-owners of the company that was established as a construction firm by his parents more than sixty years prior. The firm has had successful development ventures in residential, leisure, retail, commercial, and industrial property, and has undertaken a phased AU$350 million residential development in Brisbane's West End. He and his family members were included among the 14 new entrants on the 2014 "Rich List," with a combined estimated net worth of AU$101 million.

Stockwell serves on the board of directors of the Australian Sports Commission, and is the deputy chairman of the board. He is also the chairman of the Australian Sports Foundation, a non-profit company that raises money for Australian sport projects. He previously served as the chairman of the Gold Coast 2018 Commonwealth Games Organising Committee, having led the committee through its successful application process, but was sacked by Campbell Newman. He is a former chairman of Trade and Investment Queensland, the Queensland state government's foreign investment and export program, and a former national board member and Queensland division past president of the Property Council of Australia.

Stockwell is the past chairman and a trustee of the St Laurence's Old Boys' Foundation, which funds need-based scholarships for boys whose families cannot otherwise afford the tuition and fees at his alma mater, St Laurence's College. He is a Trustee of the Stockwell Foundation, a charitable organisation established by him and his wife to benefit at-risk children.

Stockwell ran in the election for the presidency of the Australian Olympic Committee, in the race to succeed John Coates in April 2022, but lost to Ian Chesterman.

== Political views ==
Stockwell is a supporter of the centre-right Liberal Party of Australia. During the 2019 Australian federal election campaign, Stockwell made a donation of $1,200 AUD to the Liberal National Party of Queensland (LNP).

== See also ==
- List of Australian Olympic medallists in swimming
- List of Commonwealth Games medallists in swimming (men)
- List of Olympic medalists in swimming (men)
- List of University of Florida Olympians

== Bibliography ==
- Andrews, Malcolm, Australia at the Olympic Games, Australian Broadcasting Corporation Books, Sydney, New South Wales, p. 409 (2000). ISBN 0-7333-0884-8.
