= Gold Coast bid for the 2018 Commonwealth Games =

Gold Coast Bid for the 2018 Commonwealth Games
- Logo of Gold Coast's 2018 Commonwealth Games bid
- Host city: Gold Coast, Australia
- Motto: It's our time to shine
- Opening: 4 April
- Closing: 15 April
- Main venue: Carrara Stadium
- Website: http://www.gc2018.com/

The Gold Coast bid for the 2018 Commonwealth Games was a successful bid to host the 2018 Commonwealth Games by the city of Gold Coast, Queensland, Australia. It beat the Hambantota bid for the 2018 Commonwealth Games to host the games, which will be held over 11 days, with the opening ceremony on 4 April 2018, and the last day of competition and closing ceremony on 15 April 2018.

== Background ==
On 22 August 2008, the Premier of Queensland, Anna Bligh, officially launched the Gold Coast's bid to host the Commonwealth Games in 2018. Ron Clarke, a medallist at both Commonwealth and Olympic Games and present Mayor of the Gold Coast, is expected to take a key role in promoting the bid.

On 7 April 2009, the ABC reported a land exchange deal between the City of Gold Coast and State of Queensland for Carrara Stadium. According to Mayor Ron Clarke the land will aid a potential bid for the 2018 Commonwealth Games. The land exchanged would be used as the site of an aquatics centre. In the same article Mayor Clarke raised the question of the Australian Federal Government's commitment to a 2018 Commonwealth Games Bid in light of the Government's support for Australia's 2018 FIFA World Cup Finals bid.

On 16 April 2009, Queensland Premier Anna Bligh told reporters that a successful Commonwealth Games bid by the Gold Coast could help the tourist strip win a role in hosting the World Cup. "Some of the infrastructure that would be built for the Commonwealth Games will be useful for the Gold Coast to get a World Cup game out of the soccer World Cup if we're successful as a nation," she said. However the decision on the 2018 and 2022 FIFA World Cups will come 11 months prior to the bid decision for the 2018 Commonwealth Games, so the potential World Cup venues will already have been chosen.

On 3 June 2009, the Gold Coast was confirmed as Australia's exclusive bidder vying for the 2018 Commonwealth Games. "Should a bid proceed, the Gold Coast will have the exclusive Australian rights to bid as host city for 2018," Premier Anna Bligh stated. "Recently I met with the president and CEO of the Australian Commonwealth Games Association and we agreed to commission a full and comprehensive feasibility study into the potential for the 2018 Commonwealth Games," she said. "Under the stewardship of Queensland Events new chair, Mr Geoff Dixon, that study is now well advanced."

On 15 March 2010, it was announced that the Queensland Government will provide initial funding of A$11 million for the 2018 Commonwealth Games bid. The Premier of Queensland has indicated the Government's support for the bid to the Australian Commonwealth Games Association.

On 31 March 2010, the Australian Commonwealth Games Association officially launched the bid to host the 2018 Commonwealth Games. In October 2011, Gold Coast Mayor Ron Clarke stated that the games would provide a strong legacy for the city after the games have ended.

== Venues ==
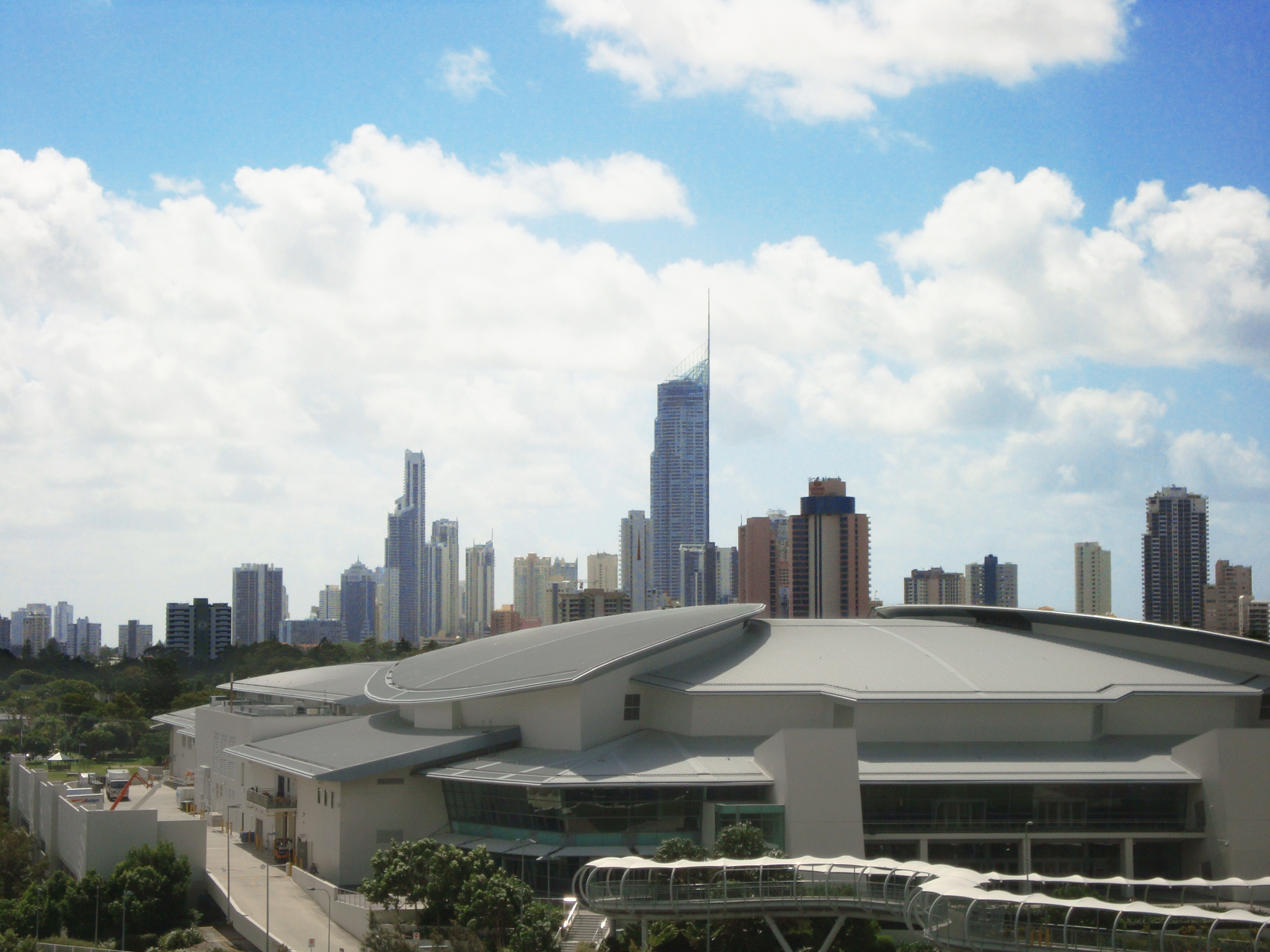
Gold coast convention and exhibition centre

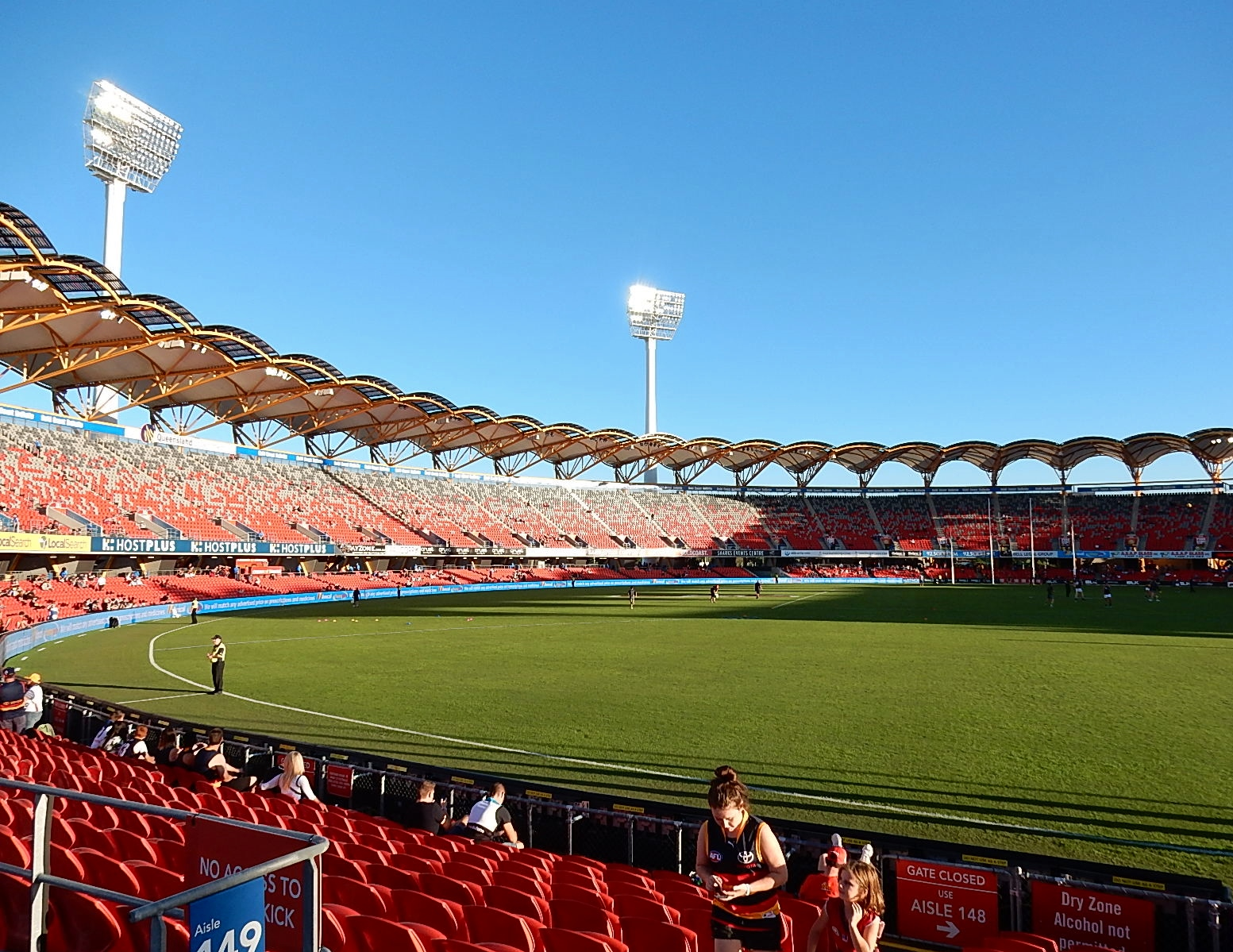
Carrara Stadium

Venue	Sports	Gross capacity	Type
Carrara Stadium	Athletics, Opening Ceremony, Closing Ceremony	40,000	Upgrade
Robina Stadium	Rugby sevens	27,500	Existing
Gold Coast Aquatic Centre	Swimming, Diving	10,000/2,500	Upgrade
Coomera Sport and Leisure Centre	Gymnastics, Netball (finals)	7,500	New
Gold Coast Convention and Exhibition Centre	Basketball (finals), Netball (preliminaries)	5,000	Existing
Gold Coast Hockey Centre	Hockey	5,000	Upgrade
Gold Coast Sports and Leisure Centre	Badminton, Powerlifting, Weightlifting, Wrestling	2,500	New
Village Roadshow Studios	Boxing, Table tennis	2,500/2,750	Temporary
Runaway Bay Sports Centre	Squash	3,000	Temporary
Broadbeach Bowls Club	Lawn bowling	2,500	Upgrade
Carrara Indoor Stadium	Weightlifting	2,500	Upgrade
Southport Broadwater Parklands	Marathon, Racewalking, Triathlon	2,500	Temporary
Elanora/Currumbin Valley	Road cycling	N/A	Temporary
Nerang National Park	Mountain biking	2,000	Upgrade
Queen Elizabeth Park	Beach Volleyball	4,000	Temporary
Venues outside the Gold Coast
Cairns Convention Centre	Basketball (preliminaries)	5,000	Existing
Townsville Entertainment and Convention Centre	Basketball (preliminaries)	5,000	Existing
Anna Meares Velodrome	Track cycling	4,000	New
Belmont, Queensland	Shooting	3,000	Upgrade

== See also ==
Commonwealth Games celebrated in Australia

- 2006 Commonwealth Games in Melbourne
- 1982 Commonwealth Games in Brisbane
- 1962 Commonwealth Games in Perth
- 1938 Commonwealth Games in Sydney
