= José Medina (swimmer) =

Mexican swimmer

Personal information
- Born: 13 February 1965 (age 61) Torreón, Coahuila, Mexico

Sport
- Sport: Swimming

José Medina (born 13 February 1965) is a Mexican swimmer. He competed in the men's 4 × 100 metre freestyle relay at the 1984 Summer Olympics.
