= North Baltimore Aquatic Club =

Maryland swim club

Coordinates: 39.365729°N 76.648897°W

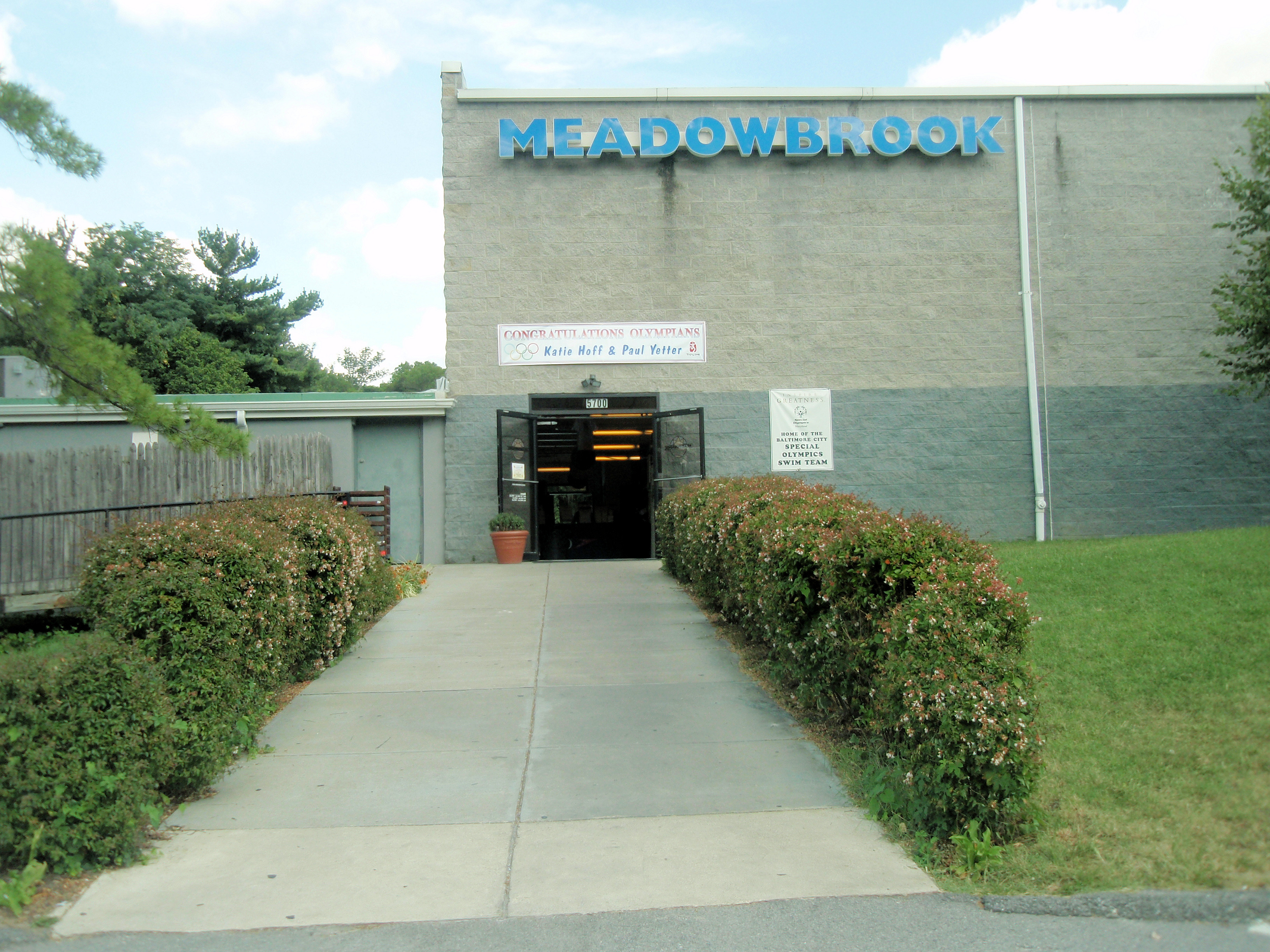
Meadowbrook Aquatic Center, one of three facilities NBAC uses

The North Baltimore Aquatic Club (NBAC) is a swim club based in and around Baltimore, Maryland. Founded in 1968, it continues to offer training for young swimmers. It is best known for developing a dozen Olympic swimmers, six of whom earned gold medals.

== Facilities ==
The club started training in the Loyola High School pool, but as it has grown, its location has changed. It currently operates out of three locations: Goucher College in Towson, the Gilman School, Coppermine's Bel Air location, and Loyola University Maryland in the North Baltimore neighborhood of Homeland. It no longer is affiliated with the Meadowbrook Pool.

== Olympic swimmers ==
NBAC has produced eight Olympic swimmers overall.

The organization's best known swimmer is Michael Phelps, who initially competed in the 2000 Sydney Games, then won six gold and two bronze medals at the 2004 Athens Games. In the 2008 Beijing Games Phelps broke seven world records and won the gold medal in all eight events that he competed in. At the 2012 London Games, he earned four gold and two silver medals. Phelps holds the records for most career Olympic gold medals in any sport and the most gold medals in a single Olympic Games, and the record for most Olympic medals overall. At the 2016 Rio Games, Phelps' fifth, he won his 21st Olympic gold medal in the Men's 4x200 freestyle relay.

Olympic swimmers who have trained at NBAC include:

- Patrick Kennedy – competed at the 1984 Los Angeles games
- Theresa Andrews – won two gold medals in the 1984 Games
- Anita Nall – won a gold, silver and bronze in the 1992 Barcelona Games.
- Beth Botsford – won two golds in the 1996 Atlanta games
- Whitney Metzler – competed in the 1996 Games
- Michael Phelps – competed in the 2000 Games (Sydney), 2004 Games (Athens), 2008 Games (Beijing), 2012 Games (London), 2016 Games (Rio); has won 23 gold, 3 silver and 2 bronze medals
- Katie Hoff – competed at the 2004 Games, won one silver and 2 bronze medals in the 2008 Games.
- Allison Schmitt – competed at 4 Olympics (2008, 2012, 2016, 2020); won a total of 10 medals, including 4 gold.
- Conor Dwyer – competed in the 2012 and 2016 Games; won gold medals as a member of the U.S. 4x200-meter freestyle relay.
- Chase Kalisz – won a silver medal in the 2016 Games in the 400IM; won gold in the 2020 Games.
- Yannick Agnel – gold medal in the 2012 Games in the 200 free and bronze medal in the 200m freestyle at the 2014 European Aquatics Championships.

== Paralympic swimmers ==
Along with NBAC's Olympic swimmers, NBAC sent their first Paralympian, 17-year-old Ian Silverman, to the 2012 Paralympic Games in London.

NBAC Paralympians

- Ian Silverman – Competed in the 2012 Paralympic Games. Gold in the 400 meter freestyle; sixth in the 4x100 meter freestyle relay, 4x100 meter medley relay, and the 50 meter freestyle; seventh in the 100 meter freestyle and 200 meter Individual Medley; and eighth in 100 meter butterfly.
- Rebecca Meyers
- Jessica Long - Competes in S8 and SB7 category events. She's held multiple world records and has won multiple gold medals over four Summer Paralympics. In total Long has won 23 Paralympic medals, making her the second most decorated American Paralympian.
