= Robin Leamy (swimmer) =

American swimmer (born 1961)

Personal information
- Full name: Robin John Leamy
- National team: United States
- Born: April 1, 1961 (age 65) Apia, Samoa
- Occupation: Real Estate administration
- Height: 6 ft 1 in (1.85 m)
- Weight: 174 lb (79 kg)

Sport
- Sport: Swimming
- Events: 50, 100 freestyle 4x100 Freestyle relay
- Strokes: Freestyle
- Club: Peninsula Aquatics
- College team: University of California, Los Angeles
- Coach: Ron Ballatore Swimming (UCLA); Bob Horn Water Polo (UCLA)
Medal record
Men's swimming
Representing the United States
Olympic Games
Gold medal – first place	1984 Los Angeles	4x100 m freestyle
World Championships (LC)
Gold medal – first place	1982 Guayaquil	4×100 m freestyle
Pan American Games
Gold medal – first place	1983 Caracas	4x100m freestyle

Robin Leamy (born April 1, 1961) is an American former competition swimmer of Samoan and New Zealand descent, who competed for UCLA, and participated in the 1984 Summer Olympics in Los Angeles, California, earning a gold medal in the 4x100-meter freestyle relay. In August 1981 at U.S. Nationals, he became a world record holder in the 50-meter freestyle, though the event was not yet featured in the Olympics. After earning an MBA from UCLA, Leamy began a career spanning over thirty-five years in real estate administration, including stints with Grubb & Ellis, and Langdon Rieder Corporation. Relocating to the San Francisco Bay area, he began working for Mohr Partners in 2000, later starting own firm Leamy Realty Group in 2010, before returning to Mohr partners in 2020.

== Early life, and swimming ==
Leamy was born in Apia, Samoa, New Zealand on April 1, 1961, but immigrated to the United States by age 13 with his family in 1974. He attended and swam for Rolling Hills High School, now Palos Verdes High School, in Southern California on the Palos Verdes Peninsula around twenty-eight miles South of Los Angeles. In club competition, Leamy trained and swam for the Peninsula Aquatics Swim Team. At the California Interscholastic Finals in March, 1978, Leamy swam a winning time of 20.96 in the 50-yard freestyle, becoming the equivalent of a California High School State Champion.

At a high point in his career in the 1981 U.S. Nationals in Brown Dear, Wisconsin on August 15, 1981, during his time at UCLA, Leamy set a world record in the 50-meter freestyle of 22.54, though the distance was not an Olympic event at the time. In an interview, Leamy noted that the 50-yard distance was common in High School and age group competition, but that the 50-meter distance had only recently been adopted as an event at the U.S. Nationals, and was not officially sanctioned as an international event by FINA. The 50-meter event did not officially appear in the Olympics until 1988 at Seoul, Korea, as Leamy had hoped. FINA first recognized the 50-meter long course event as a record in 1976 set by Jonty Skinner at the U.S. Nationals in Philadelphia on August 14, but did not recognize the 50-meter short course (25-meter pool) until March 3, 1991.

== 1984 Los Angeles Olympics ==
At the late June 1984 Indianapolis Olympic trials in Indianapolis, Leamy finished sixth in the 100-meter freestyle, qualifying him as an alternate on the U.S. Olympic Men's swimming team in the 4x100-meter freestyle for the Los Angeles Olympics in August. He trained with the U.S. team in Mission Viejo, California.

On August 2, 1984, Leamy earned a gold medal by swimming for the winning U.S. team in the preliminary heats of the 4×100-meter freestyle relay. Leamy swam on the anchor leg of the 4x100 freestyle relay in the third preliminary heat with Americans Matt Biondi, Chris Cavanaugh, and Tom Jager that recorded a combined time of 3:20.14, placing second to the strong Australian team, and advancing the U.S. team to the final round. In the final round, in a close finish, the U.S. relay team without Leamy, recorded a combined time of 3:19.03 for the gold medal, defeating the Australian relay team who recorded a combined time of 3:19.68.

=== University of California, Los Angeles ===
Leamy received an athletic scholarship to attend the University of California, Los Angeles (UCLA), from 1978-1982, graduating with a degree in Economics, where he was a four-year All American and played both water polo under coach Bob Horn and swam for coach Ron Ballatore. In his later collegiate years, During his peak competitive training at UCLA, Leamy's workouts typically consisted of a two hour morning session from 6-8 am and a three hour evening session. A weight training session of two to three hours generally took place between morning and evening pool practices.

An All-American in both sports, he was the NCAA individual national champion in the 50 and 100-yard freestyle in 1982. In addition, he anchored the 4x100 yard freestyle relay which set an American and U.S. Open Record, and captured UCLA's first and only NCAA swimming championship. In 1981, as a UCLA swim team Co-captain with Bill Barrett, Leamy established an NCAA and American record in the 50-yard freestyle of 19.36, and helped lead UCLA to the NCAA National team championship.

=== Competition highlights ===
In international competition, for two successive years, he was on U.S. International teams that captured gold medals in the 4x100 free relay at the World Championships in Guayaquil, Ecuador, in 1982, and at the Pan American Games in Caracas, Venezuela in 1983. As previously noted, at the US National championships in 1981, he re-established a new world record for the 50 meter freestyle, that held for close to four years. He had also helped the US set a world record in the 4x100 free at the 1982 Ecuador World Championships.

=== Honors ===
In November, 1976, while a Junior at Palos Verdes Peninsula's Rolling Hills High School, Leamy was an All-Ocean League selection in Water Polo, and in March 1978, was a first team All California Interscholastic Federation (CIF-3A) selection in Water Polo, as sponsored by the Citizen Savings Athletic Foundation. In 1992, Leamy was inducted into the University of California Los Angeles Hall of Fame for his collegiate swimming achievements.

=== Post swimming pursuits ===
Enrolling again at UCLA in the Fall of 1984 after the Olympics, Leamy later completed a Masters in Business Administration from UCLA's Anderson School of Management. For a twelve year period beginning around 1988, Leamy first worked for real estate firm Grubb & Ellis in California's Orange County, but later served as a Vice-President after moving to Langdon Rieder, a real estate firm just starting in the business. During Leamy's tenure, Langdon Rieder experienced substantial growth and later became part of CBRE. For a ten year period, beginning in 2000, Leamy relocated to the San Francisco Bay Area to become a managing principal for Mohr Partners in Lafayette, California from 2000-2010, later founding his own Leamy Realty group in greater San Francisco. After ten years with his Leamy Realty Group, Leamy rejoined Mohr Partners in the San Francisco Bay area around 2020.

== See also ==
- List of Olympic medalists in swimming (men)
- List of University of California, Los Angeles people
- List of World Aquatics Championships medalists in swimming (men)
- World record progression 50 metres freestyle
- World record progression 4 × 100 metres freestyle relay
