= Domingos Chivavele =

Mozambican swimmer

Personal information
- Born: 12 May 1966 (age 60)

Sport
- Sport: Swimming

Domingos Chivavele (born 12 May 1966) is a Mozambican swimmer. He competed in the men's 100 metre freestyle at the 1984 Summer Olympics.
