= Patrick Kennedy (swimmer) =

American swimmer (born 1964)

Personal information
- Full name: Patrick David Kennedy
- Nickname: "Pat"
- National team: United States
- Born: April 3, 1964 (age 62) Salem, Massachusetts, U.S.
- Height: 5 ft 11 in (1.80 m)
- Weight: 161 lb (73 kg)

Sport
- Sport: Swimming
- Strokes: Butterfly, individual medley
- Club: North Baltimore Aquatic Club
- College team: University of Florida

Patrick David Kennedy (born April 3, 1964) is an American former competition swimmer who specialized in butterfly and individual medley events.

Kennedy was born in Salem, Massachusetts. With the active encouragement of his mother, he began his competition swimming career at the local YMCA in Danvers, Massachusetts. His family moved to Baltimore, Maryland, when he was 12 years old, and he became a standout age group swimmer for the North Baltimore Aquatic Club. For high school, he attended Loyola Blakefield in Towson, Maryland, where he competed for the Loyola Blakefield Dons prep swim team.

Kennedy accepted an athletic scholarship to attend the University of Florida in Gainesville, Florida, where he swam for coach Randy Reese's Florida Gators swimming and diving team in National Collegiate Athletic Association (NCAA) from 1983 to 1986. He was the high points contributor to the Gators' back-to-back NCAA national championship teams in 1983 and 1984, and was recognized as the Southeastern Conference (SEC) Swimmer of the Year in 1984.

Following his sophomore year, he qualified for the U.S. Olympic team at the United States Olympic Trials. At the 1984 Summer Olympics in Los Angeles, California, Kennedy competed in the men's 200-meter butterfly, and finished eighth in the event final with a time of 2:01.03.

After the Olympics, Kennedy returned to the University of Florida to finish his undergraduate education. During his college swimming career, Kennedy won a total of five SEC championships, and received nine All-American honors. He graduated from Florida with a bachelor's degree in 1986, and was inducted into the University of Florida Athletic Hall of Fame as a "Gator Great" in 2008.

== See also ==
- List of University of Florida alumni
- List of University of Florida Athletic Hall of Fame members
- List of University of Florida Olympians
