= Daniel Mulumba =

Ugandan swimmer (1962–2012)

Personal information
- Born: 26 August 1962
- Died: 1 May 2012 (aged 49)

Sport
- Sport: Swimming

Daniel Michael Mulumba (26 August 1962 – 1 May 2012) was the first Ugandan swimmer to compete at the Olympic Games. He competed in the men's 100 metre freestyle at the 1984 Summer Olympics in Los Angeles. He attended Pepperdine University in the U.S., where he qualified for their swim team at the Olympics.

Mulumba was born in Kampala in August 1962. After attending Nakasero Primary School in Kampala, he moved to Namasagali College for his secondary education. He attained a Bachelor of Science Degree in Business Administration from Pepperdine University in southern California.

After his swimming career, Mulumba also worked in the information technology field.
