= Swimming at the 1979 Pan American Games – Men's 100 metre freestyle =

Men's 100 metre freestyle at the 1979 Pan American Games
- Venue: Piscina Olimpica Del Escambron
- Dates: July 8 (preliminaries and finals)
- Competitors: from - nations

Medalists
Gold medal	David McCagg	United States
Silver medal	Fernando Cañales	Puerto Rico
Bronze medal	John Newton	United States

The men's 100 metre freestyle competition of the swimming events at the 1979 Pan American Games took place on 8 July at the Piscina Olimpica Del Escambron. The last Pan American Games champion was Richard Abbott of US.

This race consisted of two lengths of the pool, both lengths being in freestyle.

== Results ==
All times are in minutes and seconds.

KEY:	q	Fastest non-qualifiers	Q	Qualified	GR	Games record	NR	National record	PB	Personal best	SB	Seasonal best

=== Heats ===
The first round was held on July 8.

Rank	Name	Nationality	Time	Notes
1	David McCagg	United States	51.43	Q
2	Fernando Cañales	Puerto Rico	52.07	Q
3	John Newton	United States	52.36	Q
4	Bill Sawchuk	Canada	53.15	Q
5	Jorge Fernandes	Brazil	53.32	Q
6	Richard Sasser	Mexico	53.80	Q, NR
7	Ernesto Domenack	Peru	53.82	Q
8	Peter Szmidt	Canada	54.21	Q
9	Alberto Mestre	Venezuela	54.54	NR
10	Scott Newkirk	U.S. Virgin Islands	54.63	NR
11	Oscar González	Mexico	54.73	
12	Alejandro Blanco	Argentina	54.81	
13	Marcus Mattioli	Brazil	55.08	
14	Jean François	Venezuela	55.24	
15	Jorge Martinez	Puerto Rico	55.25	
16	Andrew Phillips	Jamaica	55.49	
17	Conrado Porta	Argentina	55.87	
18	Alfredo Mackliff	Ecuador	56.13	
19	Gabriel Fierro	Ecuador	57.04	
20	Juan Tavarez	Dominican Republic	57.20	
21	Donaldo Clough	Dominican Republic	57.20	
22	Ruben Martinez	El Salvador	58.21	NR
23	Bobby Peterson	U.S. Virgin Islands	58.58	
24	Miguel Oqueli	El Salvador	1:00.03	

=== Final ===
The final was held on July 8.

Rank	Name	Nationality	Time	Notes
1st place, gold medalist(s)	David McCagg	United States	50.77	
2nd place, silver medalist(s)	Fernando Cañales	Puerto Rico	51.25	
3rd place, bronze medalist(s)	John Newton	United States	51.45	
4	Bill Sawchuk	Canada	52.93	
5	Ernesto Domenack	Peru	53.26	NR
6	Jorge Fernandes	Brazil	53.28	
7	Peter Szmidt	Canada	53.37	
8	Richard Sasser	Mexico	54.15	
