= Greg Fasala =

Australian swimmer (born 1965)

Personal information
- Full name: Gregory John Fasala
- Nickname: "Guru"
- National team: {Australia
- Born: 10 May 1965 (age 61) Victoria, Australia
- Height: 1.82 m (6 ft 0 in)
- Weight: 79 kg (174 lb)

Sport
- Sport: Swimming
- Strokes: Freestyle
Medal record
Men's swimming
Representing Australia
Olympic Games
| Silver medal – second place | 1984 Los Angeles | 4×100 m freestyle |
Commonwealth Games
| Gold medal – first place | 1982 Brisbane | 4×100 m freestyle |
| Gold medal – first place | 1986 Edinburgh | 100 m freestyle |
| Gold medal – first place | 1986 Edinburgh | 4×100 m freestyle |
| Silver medal – second place | 1982 Brisbane | 100 m freestyle |
| Bronze medal – third place | 1986 Edinburgh | 4×100 m medley |

Gregory John Fasala (born 10 May 1965) is an Australian former sprint freestyle swimmer of the 1980s, who won a silver medal in the 4×100-metre freestyle relay at the 1984 Summer Olympics in Los Angeles.

Coming from Victoria, Fasala was best known for being a member of the so-called Mean Machine. Debuting at the 1982 Commonwealth Games in Brisbane, Fasala combined with Neil Brooks, Michael Delany and Graeme Brewer to claim gold in the 4×100-metre freestyle relay, gaining their nickname after collectively shaving their heads for the race. In the individual event, he claimed silver behind Brooks.

In Los Angeles, he competed only in the relay, combining with Delaney, Brooks and Mark Stockwell to claim silver behind the United States team. At the 1986 Commonwealth Games in Edinburgh, Scotland, Fasala claimed gold in the 100-metre freestyle and the 4×100-metre freestyle relay.

He was an Australian Institute of Sport scholarship holder.

== See also ==
- List of Commonwealth Games medallists in swimming (men)
- List of Olympic medalists in swimming (men)
