= 1982 NCAA Men's Water Polo Championship =

Water polo tournament season

Tournament details
- Dates: December 1982
- Teams: 8

Final positions
- Champions: UC Irvine (2nd title)
- Runners-up: Stanford (5th title game)

Tournament statistics
- Matches played: 12
- Goals scored: 192 (16 per match)
- Attendance: 2,128 (177 per match)
- Top goal scorer(s): Peter Neushul, UCSB (9)

Awards
- Best player: James Bergeson, Stanford & Peter Campbell, UC Irvine & John O'Brien, UC Irvine

The 1982 NCAA Men's Water Polo Championship was the 14th annual NCAA Men's Water Polo Championship to determine the national champion of NCAA men's college water polo. Tournament matches were played at the Belmont Plaza Pool in Long Beach, California during December 1982.

UC Irvine defeated Stanford in the final, 7–4, to win their second national title. The Anteaters also finished the season undefeated (30–0).

James Bergeson (Stanford), Peter Campbell (UC Irvine), and John O'Brien (UC Irvine) were named the Co-Most Outstanding Players of the tournament. An All-Tournament Team, consisting of eight players, was also named.

The tournament's leading scorer was Peter Neushul from UC Santa Barbara (9 goals).

== Qualification ==
Since there has only ever been one single national championship for water polo, all NCAA men's water polo programs (whether from Division I, Division II, or Division III) were eligible. A total of 8 teams were invited to contest this championship.

Team	Appearance	Previous
Brown	4th	1981
California	10th	1981
Loyola–Chicago	7th	1980
Stanford	10th	1981
UC Irvine	13th	1981
UC Santa Barbara	10th	1981
UCLA	11th	1981
USC	6th	1980

== Bracket ==
- Site: Belmont Plaza Pool, Long Beach, California

Fifth place
USC	8
UC Santa Barbara	6
Seventh place
Brown	7
Loyola–Chicago	5

Consolation semifinals
Brown	8
USC	11
Loyola–Chicago	7
UC Santa Barbara	12

First round
UC Irvine	13
Brown	2
California (OT)	7
USC	6
Stanford	13
Loyola–Chicago	10
UCLA	8
UC Santa Barbara	6

Championship semifinals
UC Irvine	8
California	5
Stanford	11
UCLA	9

Championship
UC Irvine	7
Stanford	4
Third place
California	9
UCLA	10

== All-tournament team ==
- James Bergeson, Stanford (Co-Most outstanding player)
- Peter Campbell, UC Irvine (Co-Most outstanding player)
- John O'Brien, UC Irvine (Co-Most outstanding player)
- Peter Cutino, California
- Robin Leamy, UCLA
- Mike Spicer, USC
- John Tanner, Stanford
- John Vargas, UC Irvine

== See also ==
- NCAA Men's Water Polo Championship
