= Hamad Bader =

Bahraini swimmer

Personal information
- Full name: Hamad Bader

Sport
- Sport: Swimming

Hamad Bader is a Bahraini swimmer. He competed in the men's 100 metre freestyle at the 1984 Summer Olympics.
