= Peter Ward (swimmer) =

Canadian swimmer

Personal information
- Born: 18 July 1963 (age 62) North York, Ontario, Canada

Sport
- Sport: Swimming

Peter Ward (born 18 July 1963) is a Canadian former swimmer. He competed in the men's 200 metre butterfly at the 1984 Summer Olympics placing 7th.
