= Roger Birrer =

Swiss swimmer

Personal information
- Nationality: Swiss
- Born: 17 September 1963 (age 62)

Sport
- Sport: Swimming

Roger Birrer (born 17 September 1963) is a Swiss swimmer. He competed in the men's 4 × 100 metre freestyle relay at the 1984 Summer Olympics.
