= Bruno Lesaffre =

French swimmer

Personal information
- Nationality: French
- Born: 11 March 1962 (age 64)

Sport
- Sport: Swimming

Bruno Lesaffre (born 11 March 1962) is a French freestyle swimmer. He competed in the men's 4 × 100 metre freestyle relay at the 1984 Summer Olympics.
