= Peter Campbell (water polo) =

American water polo player (1960–2023)

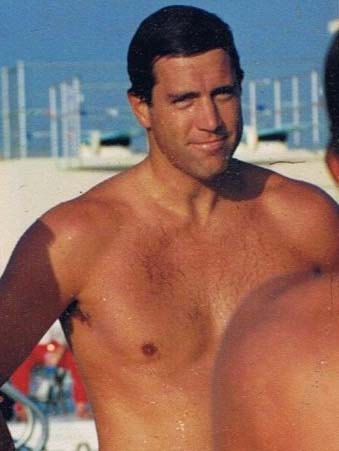
- Campbell in 1989

Personal information
- Full name: George Peter Campbell
- Born: May 21, 1960 Salt Lake City, Utah, U.S.
- Died: January 11, 2023 (aged 62) Lake Arrowhead, California, U.S.
- Height: 193 cm (6 ft 4 in)
- Weight: 89 kg (196 lb)
- Spouse: Yvonne
- Relative: Jeffrey Campbell (brother)

Sport
- College team: University of California Irvine (UCI)
- Coached by: Ted Newland (UCI); Monte Nitzkowski (84 Olympics); Bill Barnett (88 Olympics)
Medal record
Men's water polo
Representing the United States
Olympic Games
Silver medal – second place	1984 Los Angeles	Men's water polo
Silver medal – second place	1988 Seoul	Men's water polo

George Peter Campbell (May 21, 1960 – January 11, 2023) was an American water polo player.

Campbell was born May 21, 1969, in Salt Lake City but raised in Irvine, California, and started swimming competitively at the age of nine. From around 1974-1978, like his brother Jeffrey, he attended and played water polo for Irvine's University High School. Peter received recognition as a High School All American in three years at University High.

== University of California Irvine ==
Campbell attended and played water polo at the University of California Irvine under Hall of Fame Head Coach Ted Newland from 1978 to 1982. As a four-time All-American, he led UC Irvine in scoring three of his four years and helped the Anteaters win NCAA national titles in 1980 and '82. He was NCAA Player of the Year and NCAA tournament MVP in 1982. Contributing to the team in only his Freshman year, he led in scoring, being credited with a total of 64 goals, and received his first honor as an All-American. In a noteworthy freshman year, UCI captured their first PCAA championship and were third at the NCAA national tournament. He scored 46 goals in 1979, and as a Junior led the team with 62 goals. He scored 60 goals in his Senior year, placing second on the team in scoring. In his 1982, his last year of eligibility, he again helped lead the team to the NCAA championship, and made first team All-American, ending an unbeaten season with a 30–0 record. In his four years at UC Irvine, the team had a record of 96–25–1. Campbell likely played water polo primarily in the attacker/driver position or as a wing, in his collegiate and high school careers utilizing his strength and speed, and there is no mention of his playing at the fixed 2-meter (Center) or goalkeeper positions.

== Olympics ==
Campbell won two Olympic silver medals in water polo for the United States.

=== 1984 Los Angeles ===
He won his first silver medal at the 1984 Summer Olympics in Los Angeles, California at the Men's water polo tournament under Hall of Fame and Olympic Head Coach Monte Nitzkowski. The teams from Yugoslavia, Italy, the Soviet Union, Hungary and Spain were the pre-Olympic favorites to medal in water polo. Responding to the U.S. boycott of the 1980 Moscow Olympics, the teams from Hungary and Russia did not attend in 1984. The U.S. and Yugoslavia won their first three matches, and met in the final game to determine who would take the gold and silver medals. Going into the third quarter of play, the U.S. team held a late 5–2 advantage over Yugoslavia, but were unable to make another goal, and Yugoslavia tied the score 5–5 with three unanswered goals, winning due having scored more total goals in Olympic play. Yugoslavia took the gold, West Germany the Bronze and Spain placed fourth.

=== 1988 Seoul ===
Four years later, Campbell participated in the 1988 Summer Olympics in Seoul, South Korea under U.S. Olympic Coach Bill Barnett, where he won his second silver medal. Excelling as a defensive player, he led the U.S. Olympic team with nine steals in Olympic play. Pre-Olympic favorite Yugoslavia and the U.S. team were part of group play in their first Olympic match, where the U.S. team bettered Yugoslavia 7-6. But Yugoslavia performed better in the remaining rounds of group play, with the U.S. team recording a loss to the team from Spain in a score of 9-7. With more overall goals, the Yugoslavian and U.S. teams both advanced to the semi-final rounds, where they each won their first match and were later paired in the final match for the gold medal. The U.S. final match with Yugoslavia was tied 6–6 in regular play, but in overtime Yugoslavia took a 9–6 lead making the first three goals, and later won the gold medal with a 9–7 overtime win. The team from the Soviet Union took the bronze, and the West German team placed fourth.

He was chosen as a first alternate in the 1992 Summer Olympics in Barcelona, Spain.

=== International competition ===
He played for the U.S. National Water Polo Team from 1980 to 1988 and from 1990 to 1992, winning gold medals with the U.S. National team at the Pan American games in 1983 in Caracas, Venezuela, and in 1987 in Indianapolis, Indiana. He won silver medals in 1981 and 1983 with the U.S. team at the World University Games. He won a gold medal in the 1979 Summer Universiade in Ciudad de México.

Prior to his retirement from professional water polo, and before 1997, he played abroad professionally for a few years.

=== Honors ===
He was named to the UC Irvine Athletic Hall of Fame in 1997 and the USA Water Polo Hall of Fame in 2000. In 2023, the scoreboard at UC Irvine was dedicated in his honor.

His younger brother, Jeffrey Campbell, is also a former Olympic water polo player who won a silver medal in 1988 Summer Olympics in Seoul, South Korea and placed 4th in 1992 Summer Olympics in Barcelona, Spain.

Peter Campbell died on January 11, 2023 while a resident of Lake Arrowhead, California at the age of 62 and was buried at Mountainview Cemetery. His wife Yvonne survived him.

== See also ==
- List of Olympic medalists in water polo (men)
