= Blanca Morales =

Guatemalan swimmer (born 1970)

Personal information
- Born: February 3, 1970 (age 56)

Sport
- Sport: Swimming
Medal record
Representing Guatemala
Central American and Caribbean Games
| Gold medal – first place | 1986 Santiago | 100m butterfly |
| Gold medal – first place | 1986 Santiago | 200m butterfly |

Blanca Morales-Satre (born 3 February 1970) is a former Guatemalan swimmer who competed in the 1984 Summer Olympics, 1988 Summer Olympics, and 1992 Summer Olympics.
