= Michael Delany (swimmer) =

Australian swimmer (born 1965)

Personal information
- Full name: Michael William Delany
- National team: Australia
- Born: 22 August 1965 (age 60) Sydney, New South Wales
- Height: 1.82 m (6 ft 0 in)
- Weight: 84 kg (185 lb)

Sport
- Sport: Swimming
- Strokes: Freestyle
Medal record
Men's swimming
Representing Australia
Olympic Games
Silver medal – second place	1984 Los Angeles	4×100 m freestyle
Commonwealth Games
Gold medal – first place	1982 Brisbane	4×100 m freestyle
Bronze medal – third place	1982 Brisbane	100 m freestyle

Michael William Delany (born 22 August 1965) is an Australian former sprint freestyle swimmer of the 1980s, who won a silver medal in the 4×100-metre freestyle relay at the 1984 Summer Olympics in Los Angeles.

Delany was best known for being a member of the so-called "Mean Machine". Debuting at the 1982 Commonwealth Games in Brisbane, Delany combined with Neil Brooks, Greg Fasala and Graeme Brewer to claim gold in the 4×100-metre freestyle relay, gaining their nickname after three of them collectively shaving their heads for the race. In the individual event, he claimed bronze behind Brooks and Fasala. In Los Angeles, he competed in the relay, combining with Fasala, Brooks and Mark Stockwell to claim silver behind the United States team. He also competed in the individual 100-metre freestyle, but was eliminated despite winning his heat in a time of 51.22 seconds.

== See also ==
- List of Commonwealth Games medallists in swimming (men)
- List of Olympic medalists in swimming (men)
