= Hambantota bid for the 2018 Commonwealth Games =

- Logo of Hambantota's 2018 Commonwealth Games bid
- Host city: Hambantota, Sri Lanka
- Motto: Together from the heart
- Events: 228 events in 17 sports
- Opening: 16 May
- Closing: 27 May
- Main venue: Mahinda Rajapaksa International Stadium
- Website: http://www.hambantota2018.com/

Hambantota 2018 was an unsuccessful bid to stage the 2018 Commonwealth Games by the city of Hambantota, Sri Lanka. The right to host the Games was won by the Gold Coast 2018 bid after a 43-27 vote by the Commonwealth Games Federation (CGF) General Assembly on 11 November 2011 in Saint Kitts.

== Background ==
The city made their surprise bid for the Games on March 31, 2010.

Location of Hambantota in Sri Lanka.

Hambantota planned on building many new venues if it won the bid, including an athletics stadium, an aquatic centre, a multi-sports complex, a velodrome stadium and a hockey stadium. The athletes village would have been located around the Mahinda Rajapaksa International Stadium, which would have been one of the venues. The remaining venues would have been built near the cricket stadium. Unlike the Gold Coast's plan, which include venues in the nearby cities of Brisbane, Cairns and Townsville, Hambantota's venues were all planned for the same area.

== Proposed venues ==
Venue	Location	Sports	Capacity	Status
Mahinda Rajapaksa International Stadium	Hambantota	Ceremonies; Archery	60,000; 2,500	Existing/Expansion
International Aquatics Centre	Hambantota	Diving; Swimming	2,500; 5,000	New
Athletics Stadium	Hambantota	Athletics; Rugby sevens	40,000	New
Exhibition Centre hall 1	Hambantota	Badminton	2,500	New
Exhibition Centre hall 2	Hambantota	Netball preliminaries	2,500	New
Exhibition Centre hall 3	Hambantota	Weightlifting	2,500	New
Multi-Sport Complex - boxing arena	Hambantota	Boxing	3,000	New
Multi-Sport Complex - lawn bowls stadium	Hambantota	Lawn bowls	2,500	New
Multi-Sport Complex - squash arena	Hambantota	Squash	3,000	New
Multi-Sport Complex - table tennis arena	Hambantota	Table tennis	3,000	New
Multi-Sport Complex - wrestling arena	Hambantota	Wrestling	2,500	New
Velodrome	Hambantota	Track cycling	4,000	New
Main Arena	Hambantota	Gymnastics; Netball finals	5,000	New
Hockey Stadium	Hambantota	Field hockey	7,000	New
Ranminithenna Shooting Range	Hambantota District	Shooting	5,500	New
Tissa Lake triathlon course	Tissamaharama	Road cycling Triathlon	1,000; 2,000+	Temporary
Marathon course	Embilipitiya	Athletics (marathon start)	N/A	Temporary

== Proposed schedule ==
Hambantota proposed hosting the games between May 16 and 27, 2018. 17 sports and 228 events were planned to be contested if the bid was successful.

OC	Opening ceremony	●	Event competitions	1	Event finals	CC	Closing ceremony

May	16th Wed	17th Thu	18th Fri	19th Sat	20th Sun	21st Mon	22nd Tue	23rd Wed	24th Thu	25th Fri	26th Sat	27th Sun	
Ceremonies	OC											CC	
Archery				●	●	●	2	2	2	2			8
Athletics						1	5	7	6	7	7	11	44
Badminton		●	●	●	●	1	●	●	●	●	3	2	6
Boxing			●	●	●	●	●	●	●		5	5	10
Cycling		3	3	3	3				1	1	2		16
Diving								3	2	3	2		10
Gymnastics		1	1	2		5	5	1	1	4			20
Field hockey		●	●	●	●	●	●	●	●	●	1	1	2
Lawn bowls		●	●	●	●	2	●	2	●	2			6
Netball		●	●	●	●	●	●	●	●	●		1	1
Rugby sevens			●	1									1
Shooting			2	2	1	2	1	3	2	1	4		18
Squash		●	●	●	●	2	●	●	●	●	●	3	5
Swimming		5	4	8	4	10	7						38
Table tennis		●	●	●	●	2	●	●	●	1	2	2	7
Weightlifting		2	2	2	2	2	2	2	1				15
Wrestling			3	4	4	3	3	4					21
Total Gold Medals		11	15	22	14	30	25	24	15	21	26	25	228
May	16th Wed	17th Thu	18th Fri	19th Sat	20th Sun	21st Mon	22nd Tue	23rd Wed	24th Thu	25th Fri	26th Sat	27th Sun	T
