= John O'Brien (water polo) =

Australian water polo player (1931–2020)

Personal information
- Nationality: Australian
- Born: 8 October 1931 Melbourne, Australia
- Died: 13 May 2020 (aged 88)

Sport
- Sport: Water polo

John O'Brien (8 October 1931 – 13 May 2020) was an Australian water polo player. He competed at the 1956 Summer Olympics and the 1960 Summer Olympics.

In career pursuits, he coached the Richmond Water Polo Club for almost 20 years.

== Honors ==
In 2010, he was inducted into the Water Polo Australia Hall of Fame.
