= Rafael Gandarillas =

Puerto Rican swimmer (born 1968)

Personal information
- Born: September 9, 1968 (age 57)

Sport
- Sport: Swimming

Rafael Gandarillas (born 9 September 1968) is a Puerto Rican former swimmer who competed in the 1984 Summer Olympics.
