= Jeffrey Campbell (water polo) =

American water polo player (born 1962)

Personal information
- Full name: Jeffrey Guy Campbell
- Born: October 2, 1962 (age 64) Salt Lake City, Utah, U.S.
- Height: 193 cm (6 ft 4 in)
- Weight: 94 kg (207 lb)
- Relative: Peter Campbell (brother)

Sport
- Sport: Water Polo
- Position: Likely Utility player (WP)
- College team: University of California Irvine (UCI)
- Coached by: Ted Newland (UCI); Bill Barnett (Olympics)
Medal record
Men's water polo
Representing the United States
Olympic Games
Silver medal – second place	1988 Seoul	Men's water polo

Jeffrey Guy "Jeff" Campbell (born October 2, 1962, in Salt Lake City, Utah) is an American water polo player who competed for the University of California Irvine and won a team silver medal at the 1988 Summer Olympics in Seoul, in the Men's water polo tournament. He later participated in water polo at the 1992 Summer Olympics where the U.S. team placed fourth overall.

Campbell was born in Salt Lake City, Utah, and raised in Irvine, California where he played water polo for Irvine's University High School and received recognition as an All-Southern Section honoree.

== University of California Irvine ==
In the years 1982, 1983, and 1985, Jeff was both an All-American and an All-Pacific Coast Athletic award honoree at the University of California Irvine under Head Coach Ted Newland. With his size and speed, according to his Olympic coach Bill Barnett, Campbell could play any position other than goalie, and likely worked as a utility player. While at Stanford, he helped lead the team to a national title in 1982, where the team went undefeated and Jeff played with his older brother, Peter Campbell, who was also a team mate at the 1988 Seoul Olympics. Jeffrey was an NCAA Player of the Year and an NCAA tournament MVP in 1985, as well as a Pacific Coast Athletic Association Player of the year. In his last year on the team, he scored 79 goals for UCI, and was voted the Lauds and Laurels Outstanding Athlete of the year for 1985-6. He graduated with a degree in Economics in 1992.

Following his graduation at U. Cal Irvine, Campbell worked for a real estate firm as a research assistant, but had difficulty training for Olympic level conditioning and working full time. Realizing his need to remain conditioned after the 1988 Olympics, in 1990 he accepted a position as a professional player for team Siracusa in Sicily, though Siracusa was a lower division team. Campbell planned to retire from elite water polo competition after the 1992 Olympics.

== Olympics ==
=== 1988 Seoul Olympic silver ===
Jeff is a former U.S. Olympic water polo player who won a silver medal for the United States at the September, 1988 Summer Olympics in the Men's water polo tournament in Seoul, South Korea where he was coached by U.S. Olympic Coach Bill Barnett. Pre-Olympic favorite Yugoslavia and the U.S. team were part of group play in their first Olympic match, where the U.S. team bettered Yugoslavia 7-6. But Yugoslavia performed better in the remaining rounds of group play, with the U.S. team recording a loss to the team from Spain in a score of 9-7. With more overall goals, the Yugoslavian and U.S. teams both advanced to the semi-final rounds, where they each won their first match and were later paired in the final match for the gold medal. The U.S. final match with Yugoslavia was tied 6-6 in regular play, but in overtime Yugoslavia took a 9-6 lead making the first three goals, and later won the gold medal with a 9-7 overtime win. The team from the Soviet Union took the bronze, and the West German team placed fourth.

=== 1992 Barcelona Olympics ===
Four years later, Campbell was on the US water polo team at the 1992 Summer Olympics again led by Head Olympic water polo Coach Bill Barnett that placed 4th in Barcelona, Spain. Pre-game favorites Italy took the gold, Spain took the silver, and the Unified Team took the bronze.

=== International competition ===
For eleven seasons, Campbell, played for the U.S. National Team.

In international competition highlights, in 1991 Campbell helped lead the U.S. national team to a FINA World Championship, and in 1987 was on the U.S. team that won a Pan American Gold medal.

=== Honors ===
He was named to the UC Irvine Athletic Hall of Fame in 1998 and the USA Water Polo Hall of Fame in 2001.

His older brother, Peter Campbell, was also a former Olympic water polo player who won 2 Silver Medals, at the 1984 Summer Olympics in Los Angeles and in the summer of 1988 in Seoul, South Korea.

== See also ==
- List of Olympic medalists in water polo (men)
