= Fernando Marroquin (swimmer) =

Guatemalan swimmer (born 1968)

Personal information
- Born: April 19, 1968 (age 58)

Sport
- Sport: Swimming

Fernando Marroquin (born 19 April 1968) is a Guatemalan former swimmer who competed in the 1984 Summer Olympics.
