= Australia 2022 FIFA World Cup bid =

Football World Cup host nation bid

- Official logo
- Status: ✗ Unsuccessful

Location
- Country: Australia
- Proposed stadiums: List

Sport information
- Sport: Soccer (football)
- Tournament: 2022 FIFA World Cup

History
- Launched: 2009

Other information
- Government support: ✓ Yes (federal, state and territory)
- Opposition support: ✓ Yes (federal, state and territory)

Official partners
- Cisco Systems; PricewaterhouseCoopers; Qantas

Australia submitted an unsuccessful bid for the 2022 FIFA World Cup. On 2 December 2010 FIFA announced that the event would be held in Qatar. Australia also lodged a bid for the 2018 FIFA World Cup, but withdrew the bid on 10 June 2010. The 2018 and 2022 World Cups were the twenty-first and twenty-second editions of the FIFA World Cup. The bidding procedure to host both the 2018 and 2022 FIFA World Cup began in January 2009, and national associations had until 2 February 2009 to register their interest. Frank Lowy, Ben Buckley, Quentin Bryce and Elle Macpherson presented the bid.

== Background ==
After decades of hypothesising Australia's credentials to host the FIFA World Cup, the Howard Government welcomed tentative investigations into the viability of hosting the tournament as early as 2002. Football Australia, known at the time as Soccer Australia, targeted bidding for the 2014 edition of the tournament.

After realising that Brazil were overwhelmingly likely to receive the hosting rights - which they did in 2007 - Football Federation Australia (FFA) focused on a formal bid for the 2018 FIFA World Cup, announcing their intention to do so in July 2006. The announcement came shortly after Australia's successful performance at the 2006 FIFA World Cup and their switch from the Oceania Football Confederation to the Asian Football Confederation. Then-FFA CEO John O'Neill said in July 2006, "we deserve it, the one part of the world that's never hosted the World Cup, after South Africa has hosted in 2010, is the Pacific Basin", adding that "we belong to Asia now but we're also part of the Pacific, and I think the equity issue about the Pacific region not having hosted should be in our favor."

After FIFA in December 2008 announced they would be accepting bids for both the 2018 and 2022 FIFA World Cup, Australia registered their intention to bid with FIFA for the 2022 FIFA World Cup in February 2009. The bid was officially launched on 14 June 2009 at Parliament House in Canberra.

== Schedule ==
Date	Notes
15 January 2009	Applications formally invited
2 February 2009	Closing date for registering intention to bid
16 March 2009	Deadline to submit completed bid registration forms
14 May 2010	Deadline for submission of full details of bid
26–29 July 2010	Inspection committee visited Australia
2 December 2010	FIFA appointed hosts for 2018 and 2022 World Cups

== Voting ==
2022 FIFA World Cup host vote results
Country	Voting rounds			
Country	1	2	3	4
Qatar	11	10	11	14
United States	3	5	6	8
South Korea	4	5	5	~~0~~
Japan	3	2	~~0~~	~~0~~
Australia	1	~~0~~	~~0~~	~~0~~
Total Votes	22	22	22	22

== Potential venues ==
=== Submitted bid venues ===

The following are the 12 venues that were submitted to FIFA on 14 May 2010 as part of FFA's bid to host the 2022 FIFA World Cup:

Stadium (Official bid name)	Image	Host city	State	Current capacity	Notes and redevelopment plans	Construction
Melbourne Cricket Ground		Melbourne	Victoria	100,024	Due to the quality of the stadium, and the stadium's capacity, it was already in FIFA standards, and was proposed to host the opening match for the tournament, in addition to group stage, round of 16, quarter-final, semi-final and the final.	Existing stadium
Stadium Australia		Sydney	New South Wales	84,000	Having been the centrepiece of the 2000 Sydney Olympic Games, as well as the final match of the 2015 AFC Asian Cup, this existing stadium was already in FIFA standards form to host tournament matches. Australia's bid proposed the stadium would host the final match, as well as group stage, round of 16, quarter-final, and semi-final matches.	Existing stadium
Perth Stadium		Perth	Western Australia	60,000	This stadium replaced Subiaco Oval. The stadium could have been upgraded to 70,000 seats.	New stadium
Adelaide Oval		Adelaide	South Australia	53,583	Upgrades completed in 2010 replaced the western stand. For the tournament, the stadium would have had a 48,000-seat capacity to house fixtures in the group stage, round of 16, and quarter-final or match for third place. Further development of eastern and southern stands were completed in 2014 irrespective of the bid's outcome. Overall capacity following redevelopment is 53,583 with 50,083 seats and standing room for a further 3,500.	Existing stadium
Lang Park		Brisbane	Queensland	52,500	Regarded as the best rectangular sports stadium in Australia, the Brisbane Stadium was already acceptable by FIFA standards for the tournament. Proposed to host fixtures in the group stage, round of 16, and quarter-final or match for third place.	Existing stadium
Sydney Football Stadium		Sydney	New South Wales	45,500	Only minor upgrades would have been needed for the Sydney Football Stadium to meet FIFA standards for the tournament. Group stage, round of 16, and quarter-final matches were proposed for the stadium.	Minor upgrade
Newcastle International Sports Centre		Newcastle	New South Wales	33,000	A new grandstand brought the stadium's capacity to 33,000 for 2011. Further expansion for the tournament would have brought the capacity to 42,000. The stadium would possibly have hosted round of 16 and quarter-final matches in addition to the group stage matches.	Major upgrade
Townsville Stadium		Townsville	Queensland	26,500	Major upgrades to the stadium would have brought the capacity to 40,000. Potential tournament matches would have included group stage, round of 16, and quarter-final fixtures. The Queensland Government demolished the stadium in 2022.	Major upgrade
Canberra Stadium		Canberra	Australian Capital Territory	25,011	A modern 40,000-seat stadium would have been built alongside the existing stadium. Potential matches during the tournament would have included group stage, round of 16, and quarter-final matches.	New stadium
Carrara Stadium		Gold Coast	Queensland	25,000	Stadium was upgraded to 40,000-seat capacity. Redevelopment was completed in 2011 to become a principal feature for the 2018 Commonwealth Games bid. Group stage, round of 16, and quarter-final matches would have taken place at the arena.	Major upgrade
Blacktown Stadium		Blacktown	New South Wales	41,000	New 41,000-seat stadium located in the western Sydney suburb of Blacktown. The stadium would have been located in Blacktown International Sports Park, which was created for the 2000 Sydney Olympic Games to host softball and baseball events. Blacktown Stadium was proposed to host group stage, round of 16, and quarter-final matches in the submitted bid.	New stadium
Kardinia Park		Geelong	Victoria	35,000	Stadium capacity would have been increased to 44,000 for the tournament. Proposed to have hosted group stage, round of 16, and quarter-final matches.	Major upgrade

=== Rejected bid venues ===
The following is a list of stadiums that were considered at one time as part of FFA's bid to host the 2022 FIFA World Cup, but did not make the final cut:

Stadium	Image	Host city	State	Current capacity	Remarks	Current FIFA non-compliant field dimensions
Docklands Stadium		Melbourne	Victoria	53,359	Reconfigurable stadium. availability ruled out – see below: Ground sharing issues	170 m (length)
Melbourne Rectangular Stadium		Melbourne	Victoria	30,000	Stadium considered too small for World Cup use. The stadium was under construction at the time of Australia's World Cup bid. The Victorian Government considered upgrading the capacity to 40,000 but deemed it impractical due to the high cost and difficulties associated with changing the plans during construction.	
WACA Ground		Perth	Western Australia	24,500	Stadium considered too small for World Cup use.	
Wollongong Showground		Wollongong	New South Wales	20,000	Western grandstand increased capacity to 23,750. Due to a road on western side and beach on eastern side of the stadium, it is not possible to upgrade the existing stadium, however a greenfield site was suggested for a new stadium.	
Football Park	AAMI Stadium Round 1 2007	Adelaide	South Australia	51,240	Oval stadium with main seating bowl section too shallow and far from a proposed football pitch. Superseded by newly re-developed Adelaide Oval	177 x 145 m
Sydney Cricket Ground		Sydney	New South Wales	48,000	Oval stadium deemed too far from the field of play. Surplus to hosting requirements due to the proposed use of Sydney's Stadium Australia and the neighbouring Sydney Football Stadium.	153 x 137 m
The Gabba		Brisbane	Queensland	42,000	Oval stadium deemed too far from the field of play. Lang Park preferred for Brisbane.	171 x 150 m

== Ground sharing issues ==
Of the Australian stadiums that met FIFA's seating criteria, none were primary association football venues. They were predominantly cricket, Australian rules football and rugby league playing venues. At the proposed time of the World Cup during the northern hemisphere summer, these facilities are normally in regular season use by Australian rules football and the rugby codes. Former England international, Peter Withe, now living in Australia, observed that "... there are some great stadiums in Australia but a lot of them are Aussie rules arenas. These are not great for the round ball."

The need for all World Cup stadia to be used only for World Cup games prior to and during the World Cup caused controversy with the Australian Football League, and National Rugby League, who claimed that loss of access to almost all their major venues for eight weeks would severely disrupt their seasons and impact the financial viability of their clubs. The AFL advised it would not give up Docklands Stadium in Melbourne, and the management of Docklands Stadium (which includes the AFL as part owners of the venue) ruled out use of the stadium for the bid. The use of shared venues remained the only option for the bid, with the Australian authorities unwilling to invest massive amounts of money in new association football-only stadia. The development of Kardinia Park in Geelong was proposed to replace the loss of Docklands Stadium in the bid, and the stadium would have been reconfigured to a larger oval for AFL use following the World Cup. Compensation claims for the disrupted seasons of the local codes could have exceeded several hundred million dollars.

The AFL, NRL and FFA signed a Memorandum of Understanding on 9 May 2010, guaranteeing the AFL and NRL seasons would have continued if the bid succeeded. Compensation for the other football codes may have been awarded.

The seasons for Australia's football codes are as follows:

- "Q" denotes pre-competition qualifiers
- "S" denotes the start of the regular-season.
- "P" denotes playoff(s)/postseason/knockout stages.
- "F" denotes Final(s).

League	Sport	Countries	Jan	Feb	Mar	Apr	May	Jun	Jul	Aug	Sep	Oct	Nov	Dec
A-League	Association football	(Australia) (New Zealand)				P	F					S		
AFL	Australian rules football	(Australia)			S						P F			
NRL	Rugby league	(Australia) (New Zealand)			S						P	F		
Super Rugby	Rugby union	(Australia) (New Zealand) (Fiji)		S				P	P F					

== Cost concerns and benefits ==
Several stories in the Australian media questioned the restrictions and privileges that FIFA would have demanded of host cities at taxpayer expense, in addition to the need to have built and improved so many stadia or whether "mega-events" like the World Cup are cost-effective. FFA argued that these costs were overstated.

A McKinsey consultants report, with FIFA's support, rated an Australian World Cup to have been the least profitable. The United States were rated at 100%, Japan 73%, South Korea 71%, Qatar 70%, and Australia on 68%.

A study by global research firm IBISWorld claimed that the 2022 World Cup would have been worth $35.5 billion to the Australian economy – four times the amount generated by the 2000 Sydney Olympics.

== Government support ==
Australia's bid received government support from an early stage, with former Prime Minister John Howard announcing federal and state/territory government support before FFA announced their intention to bid.

Bid Chairman Frank Lowy AC announced at the bid launch that he had the personal commitment of the then-Australian Prime Minister, Kevin Rudd, who announced the Federal Government's support for the bid in February 2008. In December 2008, Federal Minister for Sport Kate Ellis announced that the Australian Government would give FFA $45.6 million to fund its World Cup bid preparation. Leader of the Opposition Malcolm Turnbull affirmed the support of the opposition on 11 December 2008 and again at the formal launch of the bid in June 2009.

Rudd met with Sepp Blatter to discuss the Federal Government's support of the bid in Zurich in July 2009.

On 23 December 2009, with concerns over costs and effects of the bid upon other sporting codes, the Federal Government established a task force to take over much of the communication lacking by the bid in Australia. The taskforce sought to negotiate with governments regarding responsibility for stadium improvements, new facilities and financial guarantees. It intended to organise and clarify ground-sharing arrangements with other sports and possible compensation for loss of venues.

== Bid website ==
Australia's bid website was launched on 14 June 2009 and contained bid information as well as being a social media platform where users could share content and connect with each other.

At the launch, FFA chairman Frank Lowy AC said the people of Australia were its "secret weapon" to snaring the 2018 or 2022 FIFA World Cup and encouraged the public to join the social networking website. The public campaign was the first bid for a major event driven almost entirely by social media. Actress Nicole Kidman, actor Hugh Jackman, model Elle Macpherson and sports stars Ian Thorpe (swimming), Liz Ellis (netball), Mark Webber (Formula One) and Steve Waugh (cricket) joined to help promote the bid. Qantas, Cisco Systems and PricewaterhouseCoopers were the bid's official sponsors.

== Aftermath and controversy ==
Australia's bid was ultimately unsuccessful, attracting just one vote from FIFA's selection committee. Frank Lowy AC expressed dismay at the result, stating: "We did our best and I know we could not have done anything better." The United States Department of Justice later indicted many of the selection committee members in the 2015 FIFA corruption case.

Franz Beckenbauer implied he voted for Australia, disclosing how he was "astonished" that the selection committee eliminated Australia in the first round of voting. German magazine Der Spiegel alleged that Beckenbaur voted for Australia after FFA promised the German Football Association that it would not bid for the 2011 FIFA Women's World Cup. Germany ultimately hosted that tournament. FIFA handed Beckenbaur a 90-day suspension from football-related activities for failing to cooperate with an investigation into the 2018 and 2022 World Cup bids.

In 2015, the Australian Federal Police announced it was investigating FFA's $500,000 donation to CONCACAF at the time of bidding. The donation was supposedly funding a new stadium in Trinidad and Tobago. Bonita Mersiades reportedly expressed reservations about the extent to which FFA was seeking to muster support for the 2022 World Cup bid, but was dismissed from her role as Head of Corporate and Public Affairs in January 2010.

In 2017, Four Corners reported that Football Australia spent $5,000,000 on projects in the ASEAN sub-confederation in an apparent attempt to influence Worawi Makudi's vote on the selection committee. FIFA suspended Mukudi from football-related activities in 2016 following acts of "forgery and falsification". The Court of Arbitration for Sport later overturned this conviction.

In 2018, Bonita Mersiades interviewed disgraced former FIFA president Sepp Blatter for her book Whatever It Takes - the Inside Story of the FIFA Way. Blatter said that Australia "had no chance" of hosting the 2022 FIFA World Cup, as it was "never going to be competitive for the broadcasters [...] Not the time zone, not the money. It is obvious. We have to make enough money at the World Cup for the next four years and Australia wouldn't be able to do it."

Blatter has also claimed to have been the only individual to have voted for Australia's 2022 World Cup bid. Blatter said that his daughter worked for Soccer Australia in the 1990s, and stated that his daughter "wanted me to vote for Australia so I could not go home and tell her I did if I didn’t [...] I knew if I didn’t vote for Australia, no-one else would and I wanted you to get at least one vote". To date, it remains unclear which FIFA selection committee member voted for Australia's bid.

Australia eventually hosted the 2023 FIFA Women's World Cup with New Zealand, succeeding against Colombia's bid by 22 votes to 13. As expected, ground sharing issues with the NRL and AFL were apparent. However, these competitions continued to play during the tournament in suburban and oval grounds.

In 2019, Football Australia were investigating the potential to bid for the 2034 FIFA World Cup with Indonesia. In October 2023, Football Australia announced its intention to bid alone for the tournament, before ultimately withdrawing after baulking at the prospect of challenging Saudi Arabia for the hosting rights. Saudi Arabia later won hosting rights as the only bidder.
