= Ahmet Nakkaş =

Turkish swimmer

Personal information
- Born: 14 November 1962 (age 63)

Sport
- Sport: Swimming

Ahmet Nakkaş (born 14 November 1962) is a Turkish swimmer. He competed in three events at the 1984 Summer Olympics.
