= Craig Klass =

American water polo player (born 1965)

Personal information
- Full name: Edward Craig Klass
- Nationality: American
- Born: June 20, 1965 (age 61) Wiesbaden, Hessen, Germany
- Height: 195 cm (6 ft 5 in)
- Weight: 98 kg (216 lb)

Sport
- Sport: Water Polo
- Position: Center Forward (2-meter position)
- College team: Stanford University
- Club: Concord Athletic Club
- Coached by: Dante Dettamanti, (Stanford)
Medal record
Men's water polo
Representing the United States
Olympic Games
Silver medal – second place	1988 Seoul	Men's water polo

Edward Craig Klass (born June 20, 1965, in Wiesbaden, Hessen) is a former water polo player who competed for Stanford University, and won the silver medal for the United States at the 1988 Summer Olympics in Seoul, South Korea.

Craig Klass was born June 20, 1965, in Wiesbaden, Hessen. He attended Las Lomas High School in Walnut Creek, California, where he played water polo from 1979-1983, and was coached by John Hilton. During his high school career, from 1981-1982, he was a High School All American, and scored an impressive 104 goals in three years of varsity play. He was named first team at the North Coast Invitational, and was a Foothill Athletic League choice, by unanimous voting. A multi-sport athlete, Klass also played basketball for Las Lomas in 1983.

During his High School years from 1981-1982, Klass played water polo for the Concord Athletic Club, and in 1991 played for the Newport Club.

== Stanford University ==
Klass attended and played water polo for Stanford University where he was managed by Coach Dante Dettamanti. While at Stanford, Klass helped the team capture NCAA championship team titles in both 1985 and 1986, and received honors as an All-American successively from 1984-86. As an upperclassman in 1986, he was named NCAA Player of the Year.

== 1988 Olympic silver medal ==
Klass won a team silver medal in water polo in the 1988 Summer Olympics in Seoul, South Korea. In the final round, the United States led the gold medalist team by 5-2 in the third quarter. Quickly responding, Yugoslavia scored four successive goals to take a 6-5 lead, then the American team tied the close match, taking the score to 6-6. In overtime, Yugoslavia scored the first three goals to lead 9-6, finally taking the gold medal with a score of 9-7. The team from the Soviet Union took the bronze.

Klass also competed for the United States at the 1992 Summer Olympics in Barcelona, Spain where the U.S. team placed fourth with Italy taking the gold, Spain taking the silver, and the Unified Team taking the bronze. Yugoslavia and Spain were the early favorites for the gold, but Yugoslavia was banned from competing as a team due to their actions in the Bosnian and Croatinan war.

In elite international competition, in 1991, Klass was part of the U.S. team that won a silver medal in the Pan American Games in La Habana (Havana), Cuba, and in the same year was part of the U.S. team that won a gold medal in the World Championships.

After his time as an elite competitor, Klass played Master's water polo for the Olympic Club in greater San Francisco from 1991-2000. During club play in 1991, 1993, and 1995, he was part of United States Water Polo national championship teams. In 1992, he played as part of a National Indoor Championship team in water polo.

=== Honors ===
In 2000, Klass became an inductee to the USA Water Polo Hall of Fame. In 1989, Klass was a United States Olympic Committee Athlete of the Year.

In professional pursuits, Klass has worked as a physical therapist.

== See also ==
- List of Olympic medalists in water polo (men)
