= Gökhan Attaroğlu =

Turkish swimmer (born 1965)

Personal information
- Born: 19 July 1965 (age 60) Istanbul, Turkey

Sport
- Sport: Swimming

Gökhan Attaroğlu (born 19 July 1965) is a Turkish swimmer. He competed in six events at the 1984 Summer Olympics.
