= Ernesto José Degenhart =

Guatemalan swimmer (born 1966)

Personal information
- Born: February 23, 1966 (age 60)

Sport
- Sport: Swimming

Ernesto José Degenhart (born 23 February 1966) is a former Guatemalan swimmer who competed in five events at the 1984 Summer Olympics.
