= Kemal Sadri Özün =

Turkish swimmer (born 1964)

Personal information
- Born: 18 May 1964 (age 62)

Sport
- Sport: Swimming

Kemal Sadri Özün (born 18 May 1964) is a Turkish swimmer. He competed in four events at the 1984 Summer Olympics.
