= İhsan Sabri Özün =

Turkish swimmer

Personal information
- Born: 23 June 1963 (age 63)

Sport
- Sport: Swimming

İhsan Sabri Özün (born 23 June 1963) is a Turkish swimmer. He competed in four events at the 1984 Summer Olympics.
