= Rodrigo Leal =

Guatemalan swimmer (born 1966)

Personal information
- Born: October 31, 1966 (age 59)

Sport
- Sport: Swimming

Rodrigo Leal (born 31 October 1966) is a Guatemalan former swimmer who competed in the 1984 Summer Olympics.
