= Roberto Granados =

Guatemalan swimmer (born 1970)

Personal information
- Born: August 18, 1970 (age 55)

Sport
- Sport: Swimming

Roberto Granados (born 18 August 1970) is a Guatemalan former swimmer who competed in the 1984 Summer Olympics.
