= Fernando Carsalade =

Brazilian water polo player

Personal information
- Born: 2 November 1964 (age 60); Rio de Janeiro, Brazil

Sport
- Sport: Water polo

Fernando Carsalade (born 2 November 1964) is a Brazilian water polo player. He competed in the men's tournament at the 1984 Summer Olympics.
