= Peter J. Cutino =

American swimming and water polo coach

- Cutino as coach at Berkeley

Biographical details
- Born: March 9, 1924; Monterey, California
- Died: September 19, 2004 (aged 71); Monterey, California
- Education: Cal. Poly San Luis Obispo

Playing career
- 1956-1957: Cal Poly San Luis Obispo

Coaching career (HC unless noted)
- 1958-1962: Oxnard High School
- 1963-1974: Berkeley, Swimming, Water Polo
- 1963-1988: U. Cal Berkeley, Water Polo
- 1972-1976: U.S. National Team
- 1976: U.S. Olympic Team
- 1989: Olympic Club; Diablo Valley WP Club

Head coaching record
- Overall: 519-172-10 (Berkeley WP)

Accomplishments and honors

Championships
- 8 NCAA titles Water Polo, (Berkeley); 4 Pac-10 Championships (Berkeley)

Awards
- 4 x NCAA, and Pac-10 Coach of the Year; CSCA Master Coach Award; 1995 WP Hall of Fame; 1994 U. of Cal. Hall of Fame

Peter J. Cutino (April 3, 1933 – September 19, 2004) was an American swimming and water polo coach and educator for over 40 years and the author of several books and numerous articles on coaching aquatic sports. In his twenty-five years as head coach at the University of California, Berkeley from 1963-1988, his Cal teams won eight NCAA titles in Water Polo and amassed a record of 519-172-10, leading many sports historians to consider him the collegiate water polo coach of his era with the most number of wins. His success as a coach of swimmers and high school, collegiate and Olympic water polo players, his work to development facilities for competition, his board work as a National Collegiate Athletic Association (NCAA) administrator, and his philanthropic support of athletes earned him national recognition. In 1999, the Peter J. Cutino Award was established in his honor by the San Francisco Olympic Club, and is presented annually to the top American male and female collegiate water polo players.

John Paul Cutino was born April 3, 1933, to Paul and Rose Marie Aiello Cutino in greater Monterey, California and attended Monterey Union High School, where he participated with the swim team. His father Paul was a fisherman of Sicilian ancestry, who fished on Monterey Bay. In his youth, Peter would occasionally work fishing in Monterey Bay with his father.

== California Polytechnic ==
Cutino attended college at Cal Poly San Luis Obispo, graduating in 1957 and received a master's degree in education from their graduate school in 1959. As an undergraduate at Cal Poly, he made the varsity water polo and swimming teams, was chosen as a three-time water polo all-conference player and held multiple school records.

== Coaching ==
Cutino had a coaching career of over thirty years, but is best remembered for his 25 year coaching tenure at the University of California Berkeley, where he coached swimming for his first eleven years, and water polo for his full twenty-five year coaching tenure.

=== Oxnard High School ===
From 1958 to 1963, he was head water polo and swimming coach at Oxnard High School, where his swim teams compiled a 64–8 record and a number of Southern California championships, while his water polo team earned a noteworthy record of 80–12. In 1961, his team played El Segundo High School coached by 1964 Olympic coach Uri Saari. The El Segundo team had a few future Olympians among its players. However, Pete had the home pool, which had a shallow end. Both the goalie and Center Forward defender of Oxnard skillfully used the bottom, though standing on the bottom is against water polo rules. In an unexpected finish, Oxnard won.

=== Cal Coach ===
In 1963 Cutino became head coach of the UC men's water polo and swimming programs. In 1974, Hall of Fame coach Nort Thornton took over the Cal swim program, leading his swim teams to two national championships. Thornton's taking over the Cal swim team ended Cutino's 11 years as swim coach from 1963-1974, bt continued his long reign as the coach of Water Polo, from his hiring in 1963 through his retirement in 1988. Through his twenty-five year tenure as Coach, Cutino led the Cal water polo teams to eight NCAA national team championships in the years 1973, 1974, 1975, 1977, 1983, 1984, 1987, and 1988 while accumulating a career record of 519-172-10. Four other times in his career, he guided Cal to runner-up finishes in the NCAA Tournament. His last water polo team at Berkeley in 1988 won 33 games, a record for the school on the way to a second successive NCAA national team title. Cutino coached five Olympians and 68 All-Americans during his time at Berkeley. His Water Polo teams won the Pacific Coast Conference-10 Championship in 1983, 1984, 1987, and 1988.

The Cutino presence at Cal water polo matches reflected both serious strategy and show. A passionate manager of his team, he would circle the pool, congratulating players, and continuously prompting the officials, while checking their calls. Capable of administering a tight reign, Kirk Everist said of his training techniques, that "He taught us that anything worth accomplishing would not come without discomfort". Everist, an Olympian, was coached by Cutino at Cal and became a coach there. According to Everist, "he was always there to administer the discomfort."

In addition to coaching at Cal, Cutino served as head coach of the US National Team (1972–76), the US Olympic Team (1976), and the US team at the World University Games in Yugoslavia (1987). He was elected to the FINA Technical Water Polo Committee, the sport's governing presence, as well as holding significant leadership roles in both USA Water Polo and the NCAA.

=== Post-Berkeley coaching ===
After retiring as Cal head coach in 1989, he coached at the Diablo Valley Water Polo Club, and the Olympic Club in San Francisco. For a period, after moving back to the Monterey area, he worked as a Director of the Monterey's Sports Center in downtown Monterey, a large club worth an estimated 15 million dollars with pools, weights, and cardiovascular equipment. He continued to conduct clinics and coached Olympic Club teams. He participated at the 2000 Olympics in Sydney, Australia, as a water polo official and served as chairman of the Men's International Olympic Committee. He took a strong interest in aiding in the construction of pools suitable for water polo and swim training competition. To recognize his efforts in securing donations to the U. Cal Aquatic program, in 2003 the Peter J. Cutino Scholarship Fund was created to give financial support to UC Berkeley athletes who met the requirements of the award.

Cutino died at his home on Monterey Avenue in Monterey on September 19, 2004 in greater Monterey, with services held September 24 at the Monterey Peninsula College Amphitheatre. He was buried at San Carlos Cemetery in Monterey and was survived by his wife Louise Donato Cutino and three children. Cutino's son Peter J. Cutino Jr. was twice an All-American at UC Berkeley. Peter Cutino Jr. helped lead Berkeley to the NCAA National Championship, was a 1983 NCAA Collegiate Player of the Year, and an NCAA Tournament Most Valuable Player.

== Awards and honors ==
=== Honors and awards ===
Peter J. Cutino Award trophy

- College Swim Coaches Association Master Coach Award, one of the most exclusive honors in aquatics.
- Four-time NCAA and Pac-10 Coach of the Year.
- UC Berkeley Alumni Centennial Award and Chancellors Commendation.
- AIA Gold Pin award from the Association International des Arbitres
- Silver Pin Award from FINA
- University of California Berkeley Athletic Hall of Fame 1994
- California State Poly. Univ. "Athletic Hall of Fame" 1987
- PAC 10 Water Polo Coach of the Year 1988
- Cal Poly Athletics Hall of Fame, 1989.
- University of California Athletic Hall of Fame, 1994
- USA Water Polo Hall of Fame, 1995
- US Congressional Award, as an educator and a coach
- Olympic Club, San Francisco, Hall of Fame 2007
- Monterey Peninsula Hall of Fame 1999

=== Named for Peter Cutino ===
- Peter J Cutino Award (presented annually to outstanding collegiate male and female water polo player)
- Cutino Cup Channel Islands Award (high school league swim champion)

== Publications ==
- Polo: The Manual for Coach and Player, January 1976, Swimming World Publications
- Monterey: A View from Garlic Hill, 1995 Central Coast Books (Biography)
- 101 Offensive Water Polo Drills, January 2001, Coaches Choice Publications
- 101 Offensive Water Polo Defensive and Conditioning Drills, January 2001, Coaches Choice Publications
