= Chris Cavanaugh (swimmer) =

American swimmer (born 1962)

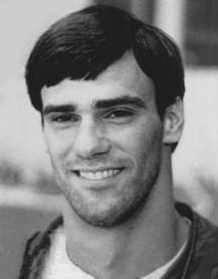
- Cavanaugh in 1984

Personal information
- Full name: Christopher Carl Cavanaugh
- Nickname: "Chris"
- National team: United States
- Born: July 1, 1962 (age 64) Hialeah, Florida, U.S.
- Height: 6 ft 4 in (1.93 m)
- Weight: 208 lb (94 kg)

Sport
- Sport: Swimming
- Strokes: Freestyle
- College team: U. of Southern California
- Coach: Peter Daland (USC)
Medal record
Representing United States
Olympic Games
Gold medal – first place	1984 Los Angeles	4×100 m freestyle
World Championships (LC)
Gold medal – first place	1982 Guayaquil	4×100 m freestyle
Pan American Games
Gold medal – first place	1983 Caracas	4×100 m freestyle

Christopher Carl Cavanaugh (born July 1, 1962) is an American former competition swimmer, who swam for the University of Southern California, a former world record holder in the 50 meter freestyle and an Olympic champion.

Cavanaugh was born July 1, 1962, in Hialeah, Florida, and attended and swam for the Ransom Everglades School in Coconut Grove, outside Miami, graduating around 1980. In March, 1977, as only a Freshman among all Dade County competitive swimmers, Cavanaugh placed third in the 200 freestyle with a time of 1:51.0, second in the 50 freestyle with a time of 22.3, third in the 100 butterfly with a 56.1, first in the 100 freestyle with a 48.9, and second in the 100 breaststroke with a 1:05.5. Cavanaugh was already showing his strength at the 100-yard distance, and excelled in the 50-yard distance as well. Cavanaugh was a member of the All Dade County team of the Miami Herald in May, 1977. In March, 1977, Cavanaugh set a national age group record in the 50-yard freestyle of 22.3. Among his early coaches with the Ransom Everglades School team was his father "Cav Cavanaugh". In his freshman year, Cavanaugh was made a member of the Miami Herald's "All Dade County team" in May, 1977.

Qualifying for the Olympics in 1980, Cavanaugh was part of the U.S. Olympic team that led a boycott of the 1980 Summer Olympics in Moscow.

Prior to his gold medal at the 1984 Olympics, he was on a World Record 4x100 freestyle relay team at the World Championships in Guayaquil, Equador on August 5, 1983, where he swam the first leg in a time of 50.13.

== 1984 Olympic gold medal ==
He was a member of the gold medal U.S. team in the 4×100-meter freestyle relay at the 1984 Summer Olympics in Los Angeles, finishing with a final time of 3:19.03 which improved on America's own world record set at the World Championships in 1982. In a close finish, the Australian team took second for silver, finishing with a time of 3:19.68, finishing only .65 seconds later.

=== University of Southern California ===
Cavanaugh was an All-American swimmer and captain of the USC Trojans swimming team at the University of Southern California, where he swam for Hall of Fame Coach Peter Daland. He also played water polo for USC, graduating in 1986.

=== Later life ===
After completing his swimming career, Cavanaugh coached United States Masters swimmers and club swimmers in Southern California.

Cavanaugh has volunteered as a celebrity swimmer for charitable organizations including Swim Across America, an American-based fund raiser for cancer research. He now coaches and swims Masters having held many Masters National records. He also works with United States Swimming, and club swimmers at all levels. He resides in San Jose, California and formerly served as president of the board of directors of the highly competitive Santa Clara Swim Club.

== See also ==
- List of Olympic medalists in swimming (men)
- List of University of Southern California people
- List of World Aquatics Championships medalists in swimming (men)
- World record progression 50 metres freestyle
- World record progression 4 × 100 metres freestyle relay

Records
Preceded by Klaus Steinbach	Men's 50-meter freestyle world record-holder (long course); February 2, 1980 – April 10, 1980	Succeeded by Rowdy Gaines
