= Alberto Mestre (swimmer, born 1964) =

Venezuelan swimmer (born 1964)

Personal information
- Full name: Alberto Eugenio Mestre Sosa
- National team: Venezuela
- Born: September 30, 1964 (age 61)
- Height: 6 ft 5 in (1.96 m)
- Weight: 220 lb (100 kg)

Sport
- Sport: Swimming
- Strokes: Freestyle
- College team: University of Florida (U.S.)
Medal record
Men's swimming
Representing Venezuela
Pan American Games
Silver medal – second place	1983 Caracas	200m freestyle
Bronze medal – third place	1983 Caracas	100m freestyle
Bronze medal – third place	1983 Caracas	4x100m freestyle
Bronze medal – third place	1983 Caracas	4x200m freestyle
Bronze medal – third place	1983 Caracas	4x100m medley

Alberto Eugenio Mestre Sosa (born September 30, 1964) is a former competition swimmer who represented Venezuela at the 1980 Summer Olympics and 1984 Summer Olympics.

== Biography ==
As a 15-year-old at the 1980 Summer Olympics in Moscow, Mestre competed in the qualifying heats of the 100-meter and 200-meter freestyle events, but he did not advance. Three years later, Mestre enjoyed significant success at the 1983 Pan American Games in Caracas. He won a silver medal in the 200-meter freestyle, a bronze in the 100-meter freestyle, and three more bronzes as a member of Venezuela's third-place relay teams in three different relay events. Married Adriana Vivas, and has two children Alberto and Alfonso Mestre, both competitive swimmers.

After the 1983 Pan American Games, Mestre enrolled in the University of Florida in Gainesville, Florida, where he trained with coach Randy Reese and swam for the Florida Gators swimming and diving team in National Collegiate Athletic Association (NCAA) competition from 1983 to 1986. He was a member of three NCAA national champion relays, helping to propel the Gators to NCAA national team championships in 1983 and 1984. Mestre received seventeen All-American honors in four years. He graduated from the University of Florida with a bachelor's degree in exercise and sport science in 1987, and was later inducted in the University of Florida Athletic Hall of Fame as a "Gator Great."

At the 1984 Summer Olympics in Los Angeles, Mestre again competed in the 100-meter and 200-meter freestyle, advancing to the finals in both events, and finishing sixth and fifth, respectively. He also was a member of Venezuela's relay teams in the 4x100-meter freestyle, 4x200-meter freestyle, and 4x100-meter medley relay events, competing in the qualifying heats of those three events.

== See also ==
- Florida Gators
- List of University of Florida alumni
- List of University of Florida Athletic Hall of Fame members
- List of University of Florida Olympians
