= Swimming at the 1978 World Aquatics Championships =

1978 World Aquatics Swimming Championships

These are the results (medal winners) of the swimming competition at the 1978 World Aquatics Championships held in the city of West Berlin between August 20 and August 28.

== Medal table ==
* Host nation (West Germany)

Rank	Nation	Gold	Silver	Bronze	Total
1	United States (USA)	20	12	4	36
2	Soviet Union (URS)	4	4	5	13
3	Australia (AUS)	2	0	0	2
4	East Germany (GDR)	1	7	4	12
5	West Germany (FRG)*	1	2	4	7
6	Canada (CAN)	1	1	4	6
7	New Zealand (NZL)	0	1	0	1
7	Norway (NOR)	0	1	0	1
7	Yugoslavia (YUG)	0	1	0	1
10	Great Britain (GBR)	0	0	2	2
10	Hungary (HUN)	0	0	2	2
10	Sweden (SWE)	0	0	2	2
13	Brazil (BRA)	0	0	1	1
13	Denmark (DEN)	0	0	1	1
Totals (14 entries)		29	29	29	87

- Record(*)

== Medal summary ==
=== Men ===
Event	Gold		Silver		Bronze	
100 m freestyle	David McCagg (USA)	50.24; CR	Jim Montgomery (USA)	50.73	Klaus Steinbach (FRG)	50.79
200 m freestyle	Bill Forrester (USA)	1:51.02; CR	Rowdy Gaines (USA)	1:51.10	Sergey Kopliakov (URS)	1:51.33
400 m freestyle	Vladimir Salnikov (URS)	3:51.94; CR	Jeff Float (USA)	3:53.42	Bill Forrester (USA)	3:53.97
1500 m freestyle	Vladimir Salnikov (URS)	15:03.99; CR	Borut Petrič (YUG)	15:20.77	Bobby Hackett (USA)	15:23.38
100 m backstroke	Bob Jackson (USA)	56.36; CR	Peter Rocca (USA)	56.69	Romulo Arantes (BRA)	58.01
200 m backstroke	Jesse Vassallo (USA)	2:02.16	Gary Hurring (NZL)	2:03.71	Zoltán Verrasztó (HUN)	2:03.90
100 m breaststroke	Walter Kusch (FRG)	1:03.56; CR	Graham Smith (CAN)	1:03.60	Gerald Mörken (FRG)	1:03.62
200 m breaststroke	Nick Nevid (USA)	2:16.37; CR	Arsens Miskarovs (URS)	2:18.42	Walter Kusch (FRG)	2:20.16
100 m butterfly	Joe Bottom (USA)	54.30	Greg Jagenburg (USA)	55.26	Pär Arvidsson (SWE)	55.38
200 m butterfly	Mike Bruner (USA)	1:59.38; CR	Steve Gregg (USA)	1:59.80	Roger Pyttel (GDR)	2:01.33
200 m individual medley	Graham Smith (CAN)	2:03.65; WR	Jesse Vassallo (USA)	2:04.99	Aleksandr Sidorenko (URS)	2:05.29
400 m individual medley	Jesse Vassallo (USA)	4:20.05; WR	Sergey Fesenko (URS)	4:22.29	András Hargitay (HUN)	4:27.04
4 × 100 m freestyle relay	United States (USA); Jack Babashoff; Rowdy Gaines; Jim Montgomery; David McCagg	3:19.74; WR	West Germany (FRG); Andreas Schmidt; Ulrich Temps; Peter Knust; Klaus Steinbach	3:26.65	Sweden (SWE); Per Holmertz; Dan Larsson; Per-Ola Quist; Per-Alvar Magnusson	3:26.95
4 × 200 m freestyle relay	United States (USA); Bruce Furniss; Bill Forrester; Bobby Hackett; Rowdy Gaines	7:20.82; WR	Soviet Union (URS); Sergey Rusin; Andrey Krylov; Vladimir Salnikov; Sergey Kopliakov	7:28.41	West Germany (FRG); Andreas Schmidt; Peter Knust; Karsken Lippmann; Frank Wennmann	7:33.29
4 × 100 m medley relay	United States (USA); Bob Jackson; Nick Nevid; Joe Bottom; David McCagg	3:44.63; CR	West Germany (FRG); Klaus Steinbach; Walter Kusch; Michael Kraus; Andreas Schmidt	3:48.58	Great Britain (GBR); Gary Abraham; Duncan Goodhew; John Mills; Martin Smith	3:49.06

Legend: WR – World record; CR – Championship record

=== Women ===
Event	Gold		Silver		Bronze	
100 m freestyle	Barbara Krause (GDR)	55.68; CR	Lene Jenssen (NOR)	56.82	Larisa Tsaryova (URS)	56.85
200 m freestyle	Cynthia Woodhead (USA)	1:58.53; WR	Barbara Krause (GDR)	1:59.78	Larisa Tsaryova (URS)	2:01.76
400 m freestyle	Tracey Wickham (AUS)	4:06.28; WR	Cynthia Woodhead (USA)	4:07.15	Kim Linehan (USA)	4:07.73
800 m freestyle	Tracey Wickham (AUS)	8:24.94; CR	Cynthia Woodhead (USA)	8:29.35	Kim Linehan (USA)	8:32.60
100 m backstroke	Linda Jezek (USA)	1:02.55; CR	Birgit Treiber (GDR)	1:03.18	Cheryl Gibson (CAN)	1:03.43
200 m backstroke	Linda Jezek (USA)	2:11.93; WR	Birgit Treiber (GDR)	2:14.07	Cheryl Gibson (CAN)	2:14.23
100 m breaststroke	Yuliya Bogdanova (URS)	1:10.31; WR	Tracy Caulkins (USA)	1:10.77	Margaret Kelly (GBR)	1:11.99
200 m breaststroke	Lina Kačiušytė (URS)	2:31.42; WR	Yuliya Bogdanova (URS)	2:32.69	Susanne Nielsson (DEN)	2:33.60
100 m butterfly	Joan Pennington (USA)	1:00.20; CR	Andrea Pollack (GDR)	1:00.26	Wendy Quirk (CAN)	1:01.82
200 m butterfly	Tracy Caulkins (USA)	2:09.87; WR	Nancy Hogshead (USA)	2:11.30	Andrea Pollack (GDR)	2:12.63
200 m individual medley	Tracy Caulkins (USA)	2:14.07; WR	Joan Pennington (USA)	2:14.98	Ulrike Tauber (GDR)	2:15.99
400 m individual medley	Tracy Caulkins (USA)	4:40.83; WR	Ulrike Tauber (GDR)	4:47.52	Petra Schneider (GDR)	4:48.56
4 × 100 m freestyle relay	United States (USA); Tracy Caulkins; Stephanie Elkins; Jill Sterkel; Cynthia Woodhead	3:43.43; WR	East Germany (GDR); Heike Witt; Caren Metschuck; Barbara Krause; Petra Priemer	3:47.37	Canada (CAN); Gail Amundrud; Nancy Garapick; Sue Sloan; Wendy Quirk	3:49.59
4 × 100 m medley relay	United States (USA); Linda Jezek; Tracy Caulkins; Joan Pennington; Cynthia Woodhead	4:08.21; CR	East Germany (GDR); Birgit Treiber; Ramona Reinke; Andrea Pollack; Barbara Krause	4:09.13	Soviet Union (URS); Elena Kruglova; Yuliya Bogdanova; Irina Aksenova; Larisa Tsaryova	4:14.91

Legend: WR – World record; CR – Championship record
