= Swimming at the 1979 Pan American Games – Men's 4 × 200 metre freestyle relay =

Men's 4 × 200 metre freestyle relay at the 1979 Pan American Games
- Venue: Piscina Olimpica Del Escambron
- Dates: July 6 (preliminaries and finals)
- Competitors: from - nations

Medalists
Gold medal	Brian Goodell, David Larson, Kris Kirchner and Rowdy Gaines	United States
Silver medal	Cyro Delgado, Djan Madruga, Jorge Fernandes and Marcus Mattioli	Brazil
Bronze medal	Peter Szmidt, Graham Welbourn, Rob Bayliss and Bill Sawchuk	Canada

The men's 4 × 200 metre freestyle relay competition of the swimming events at the 1979 Pan American Games took place on 6 July at the Piscina Olimpica Del Escambron. The last Pan American Games champion was the United States.

This race consisted of sixteen lengths of the pool. Each of the four swimmers completed four lengths of the pool. The first swimmer had to touch the wall before the second could leave the starting block.

== Results ==
All times are in minutes and seconds.

KEY:	q	Fastest non-qualifiers	Q	Qualified	GR	Games record	NR	National record	PB	Personal best	SB	Seasonal best

=== Heats ===
The first round was held on July 6.

Rank	Name	Nationality	Time	Notes
1	- - - -	Canada	7:40.54	Q
2	- - - -	Brazil	7:45.99	Q
3	- - - -	United States	7:54.20	Q
4	- - - -	Mexico	7:55.93	Q
5	- - - -	Puerto Rico	8:10.56	Q
6	- - - -	Venezuela	8:17.60	Q
7	- - - -	Argentina	8:24.54	Q
8	- - - -	Ecuador	8:26.70	Q

=== Final ===
The final was held on July 6.

Rank	Name	Nationality	Time	Notes
1st place, gold medalist(s)	Brian Goodell (1:50.62) NR, GR; David Larson (1:53.10); Kris Kirchner (1:53.97); Rowdy Gaines (1:53.59)	United States	7:31.28	NR, GR
2nd place, silver medalist(s)	Marcus Mattioli (1:54.71); Cyro Delgado (2:01.84); Jorge Fernandes (1:50.10); Djan Madruga (1:52.27)	Brazil	7:38.92	SA
3rd place, bronze medalist(s)	Peter Szmidt (1:54.35); Graham Welbourn (1:57.66); Rob Bayliss (1:54.37); Bill Sawchuk (1:52.89)	Canada	7:39.27	
4	Fernando Cañales (1:53.64); José de Jesus (1:58.52); Jorge Martinez (1:58.13); Filiberto Colon (2:01.13)	Puerto Rico	7:51.42	NR
5	Oscar González (1:58.82); Alfredo Romo (1:59.81); César Sánchez (1:59.15); Richard Sasser (1:57.85)	Mexico	7:55.63	NR
6	- - - -	Venezuela	8:07.25	NR
7	- - - -	Ecuador	8:13.71	
8	- - - -	Argentina	8:23.41	
