= Swimming at the 1981 Summer Universiade =

Swimming at the XI Summer Universiade

The swimming competition at the 1981 Summer Universiade took place in Bucharest, Romania.

== Men's events ==
Event	Gold		Silver		Bronze	
100 m freestyle	Kris Kirschner; United States	51.39	Serhiy Krasyuk; Soviet Union	51.86	Jorge Fernandes; Brazil	52.06
200 m freestyle	Andy Schmidt; United States	1:52.62 GR	Jorge Fernandes; Brazil	1:52.92	Djan Madruga; Brazil	1:53.00
400 m freestyle	Daniel Machek; Czechoslovakia	3:58.08	Djan Madruga; Brazil	3:58.54	Sergey Kalashnikov; Soviet Union	4:00.95
1500 m freestyle	Aleksandr Chayev; Soviet Union	15:22.25 GR	Sergey Kalashnikov; Soviet Union	15:40.62	Monte Brown; United States	15:48.70
100 m backstroke	Sergei Zabolotnov; Soviet Union	58.09	Vladimir Dolgov; Soviet Union	58.19	Rômulo Arantes; Brazil	58.24
200 m backstroke	Sergei Zabolotnov; Soviet Union	2:03.65	Djan Madruga; Brazil	2:03.73	Zbigniew Januszkiewicz; Poland	2:05.37
100 m breaststroke	Nicholas Nevid; United States	1:04.33	Peter Lang; West Germany	1:05.06	Arsens Miskarovs; Soviet Union	1:05.41
200 m breaststroke	Arsens Miskarovs; Soviet Union	2:19.42 GR	Nicholas Nevid; United States	2:21.47	Aleksandr Fedorovsky; Soviet Union	2:23.62
100 m butterfly	William Paulus; United States; Robert Placak; United States	55.41	Not awarded		Sergei Kiselyov; Soviet Union	56.29
200 m butterfly	Sergey Fesenko, Sr. Soviet Union	2:01.86	Levente Mady; Canada	2:04.75	Sergei Kiselyov; Soviet Union	2:04.85
200 m individual medley	Sergey Fesenko, Sr. Soviet Union	2:06.34 GR	Aleksey Markovsky; Soviet Union	2:08.37	Alan Swanston; Canada	2:09.48
400 m individual medley	Sergey Fesenko, Sr. Soviet Union	4:25.53	Peter Dobson; Canada	4:31.65	Daniel Machek; Czechoslovakia	4:32.16
4×100 m freestyle relay	United States (USA); Jerry Spencer; Andy Schmidt; Paul Goodridge; Kris Kirschner	3:27.84	Soviet Union (URS); Yuri Prisekin; Alexey Filonov; Aleksey Markovsky; Serhiy Krasyuk	3:28.09	Brazil (BRA); Jorge Fernandes; Marcus Mattioli; Ronald Menezes; Djan Madruga	3:32.42
4×200 m freestyle relay	Soviet Union (URS)	7:33.96 GR	United States (USA); Andy Schmidt; Jimmy Lee; B. McCarthy; Kris Kirschner	7:34.11	Brazil (BRA)	7:38.32
4×100 m medley relay	Soviet Union (URS); Sergei Zabolotnov; Arsens Miskarovs; Sergei Kiselyov; Serhiy Krasyuk	3:48.75	United States (USA); Dave Wilson; Nicholas Nevid; Bob Placak; Kris Kirschner	3:49.55	Brazil (BRA); Rômulo Arantes; Luiz Carvalho; Marcus Mattioli; Jorge Fernandes	3:55.10

Legend: CR – Championship record; CWR – Commonwealth record; NR – National record

== Women's events ==
Event	Gold		Silver		Bronze	
100 m freestyle	Jill Sterkel; United States	57.17	Barbara Major; United States	58.28	Olga Klevakina; Soviet Union	58.65
200 m freestyle	Jill Sterkel; United States	2:03.97 GR	Olga Klevakina; Soviet Union	2:04.58	Irina Laricheva; Soviet Union	2:05.38
400 m freestyle	Kim Linehan; United States	4:15.26	Irina Laricheva; Soviet Union	4:15.50	Sherri Hanna; United States	4:21.01
800 m freestyle	Kim Linehan; United States	8:37.50 GR	Irina Laricheva; Soviet Union	8:45.01	Sherri Hanna; United States	8:46.57
100 m backstroke	Carmen Bunaciu; Romania	1:02.47 GR	Kim Carlisle; United States	1:04.53	Susan Walsh; United States	1:04.74
200 m backstroke	Carmen Bunaciu; Romania	2:13.21	Kim Carlisle; United States	2:19.02	Susan Walsh; United States	2:19.11
100 m breaststroke	Angelika Knipping; West Germany	1:14.20	Liang Weifen; China	1:14.48	Lina Kačiušytė; Soviet Union	1:14.54
200 m breaststroke	Lina Kačiušytė; Soviet Union	2:35.85 GR	Irena Fleissnerová; Czechoslovakia	2:38.64	Cindy Tuttle; United States	2:41.66
100 m butterfly	Jill Sterkel; United States	1:01.91 GR	Carol Borgmann; United States	1:02.43	Carmen Bunaciu; Romania	1:02.98
200 m butterfly	Kim Carlisle; United States	2:15.71	Susie Woodhouse; Australia	2:15.97	Mayumi Yokoyama; United States	2:17.52
200 m individual medley	Kim Carlisle; United States	2:20.43 GR	Olga Klevakina; Soviet Union	2:20.81	Barbara Selter; West Germany	2:24.17
400 m individual medley	Mayumi Yokoyama; United States	4:55.45 GR	Irinel Panulescu; Romania	5:03.78	Malgorzata Rozycka; Poland	5:07.49
4×100 m freestyle relay	United States (USA); Annie Lett; Carol Borgmann; Barbara Major; Jill Sterkel	3:55.05	Soviet Union (URS); Irina Laricheva; Olga Eliseeva; Irina Orliuk; Olga Klevakina	3:57.64	Canada (CAN); Kelly Neuber; Leslie Brafield; Sylvie Kennedy; Valerie Whyte	4:00.59
4×100 m medley relay	United States (USA); Kim Carlisle; Patricia Waters; Jill Sterkel; Barbara Major	4:18.84	Romania (ROM); Carmen Bunaciu; Brigitte Prass; Mariana Paraschiv; Irinel Pănulescu	4:22.14	Soviet Union (URS); Irina Orliuk; Lina Kačiušytė; Olga Klevakina; Irina Laricheva	4:25.96

Legend: CR – Championship record; CWR – Commonwealth record; NR – National record

Men's 100 m freestyle

Rank	Name	Nationality	Time	Notes
1st place, gold medalist(s)	Kris Kirschner	United States	51.39	
2nd place, silver medalist(s)	Serhiy Krasyuk	Soviet Union	51.86	
3rd place, bronze medalist(s)	Jorge Fernandes	Brazil	52.06	
4	Jerry Spencer	United States	52.17	
5	Yuri Prisekin	Soviet Union	52.38	
6	Gerd Kohlat	West Germany	53.63	
7	Per-Alvar Magnusson	Sweden	53.71	
8	Graeme Brewer	Australia	53.73	

Men's 200 m freestyle

Rank	Name	Nationality	Time	Notes
1st place, gold medalist(s)	Andy Schmidt	United States	1:52.62	GR
2nd place, silver medalist(s)	Jorge Fernandes	Brazil	1:52.92	
3rd place, bronze medalist(s)	Djan Madruga	Brazil	1:53.00	
4	Yuri Logvin	Soviet Union	1:53.01	
5	Yuri Prisekin	Soviet Union	1:53.93	
6	Daniel Machek	Czechoslovakia	1:54.93	
7	Dennis Corcoran	Canada	1:55.82	
8	Hiroshi Sakamoto	Japan	1:56.39	

Men's 400 m freestyle

Rank	Name	Nationality	Time	Notes
1st place, gold medalist(s)	Daniel Machek	Czechoslovakia	3:58.08	
2nd place, silver medalist(s)	Djan Madruga	Brazil	3:58.54	
3rd place, bronze medalist(s)	Sergey Kalashnikov	Soviet Union	4:00.95	
4	Graeme Brewer	Australia	4:04.03	
5	James Lee	United States	4:04.95	
6	Ron McKeon	Australia	4:05.85	
7	Eugene Gyorfi	Canada	4:08.71	
8	Marcelo Jucá	Brazil	4:08.88	

Men's 1500 m freestyle

Rank	Name	Nationality	Time	Notes
1st place, gold medalist(s)	Aleksandr Chayev	Soviet Union	15:22.25	GR
2nd place, silver medalist(s)	Sergey Kalashnikov	Soviet Union	15:40.62	
3rd place, bronze medalist(s)	Monte Brown	United States	15:48.70	
4	Marcelo Jucá	Brazil	15:57.80	
5	Eugene Gyorfi	Canada	16:04.58	
6	Robert Bylis	Canada	16:09.41	
7	Hiroaki Kaneko	Japan	16:11.22	
8	Tizoc Guemez	Mexico	16:31.89	

Men's 100 m backstroke

Rank	Name	Nationality	Time	Notes
1st place, gold medalist(s)	Sergei Zabolotnov	Soviet Union	58.09	
2nd place, silver medalist(s)	Vladimir Dolgov	Soviet Union	58.19	
3rd place, bronze medalist(s)	Rômulo Arantes	Brazil	58.24	
4	Dave Wilson	United States	58.69	
5	Zbigniew Januszkiewicz	Poland	59.56	
6	Clay Britt	United States	59.63	
7	Miloslav Rolko	Czechoslovakia	59.76	
8	Hidetoshi Takahashi	Japan	1:00.01	

Men's 200 m backstroke

Rank	Name	Nationality	Time	Notes
1st place, gold medalist(s)	Sergei Zabolotnov	Soviet Union	2:03.65	
2nd place, silver medalist(s)	Djan Madruga	Brazil	2:03.73	
3rd place, bronze medalist(s)	Zbigniew Januszkiewicz	Poland	2:05.37	
4	Vladimir Dolgov	Soviet Union	2:05.97	
5	Hidetoshi Takahashi	Japan	2:07.07	
6	James Fowler	United States	2:09.10	
7	Josef Kuf	Czechoslovakia	2:09.40	
8	Mihai Mandache	Romania	2:10.12	

Men's 100 m breaststroke

Rank	Name	Nationality	Time	Notes
1st place, gold medalist(s)	Nicholas Nevid	United States	1:04.33	
2nd place, silver medalist(s)	Peter Lang	West Germany	1:05.06	
3rd place, bronze medalist(s)	Arsens Miskarovs	Soviet Union	1:05.41	
4	Robert Jackson	United States	1:05.70	
5	Wang Lin	China	1:06.09	
6	Aleksandr Fedorovsky	Soviet Union	1:06.13	
7	Marco Veilleux	Canada	1:06.64	
8	Tatsuo Abe	Japan	1:07.72	

Men's 200 m breaststroke

Rank	Name	Nationality	Time	Notes
1st place, gold medalist(s)	Arsens Miskarovs	Soviet Union	2:19.42	GR
2nd place, silver medalist(s)	Nicholas Nevid	United States	2:21.47	
3rd place, bronze medalist(s)	Aleksandr Fedorovsky	Soviet Union	2:23.62	
4	Wang Lin	China	2:24.39	
5	Asao Aoki	Japan	2:25.24	
6	Marco Veilleux	Canada	2:25.49	

Men's 100 m butterfly

Rank	Name	Nationality	Time	Notes
1st place, gold medalist(s)	William Paulus	United States	55.41	
1st place, gold medalist(s)	Robert Placak	United States	55.41	
3rd place, bronze medalist(s)	Sergei Kiselyov	Soviet Union	56.29	
4	Kenji Izumi	Japan	57.07	
5	Per-Alvar Magnusson	Sweden	57.70	
6	Marcus Mattioli	Brazil	57.71	
7	Luo Zhaoying	China	57.79	
7	Levente Mady	Canada	57.79	

Men's 200 m butterfly

Rank	Name	Nationality	Time	Notes
1st place, gold medalist(s)	Sergey Fesenko, Sr.	Soviet Union	2:01.86	
2nd place, silver medalist(s)	Levente Mady	Canada	2:04.75	
3rd place, bronze medalist(s)	Sergei Kiselyov	Soviet Union	2:04.85	
4	Yoshinobu Shidara	Japan	2:05.04	
5	Shinsuke Kayama	Japan	2:05.14	
6	Juan Carlos Fontoura	Brazil	2:06.16	
7	Gérard de Kort	Netherlands	2:07.27	
8	Flavius Vişan	Romania	2:09.41	

Men's 200 m individual medley

Rank	Name	Nationality	Time	Notes
1st place, gold medalist(s)	Sergey Fesenko, Sr.	Soviet Union	2:06.34	GR
2nd place, silver medalist(s)	Aleksey Markovsky	Soviet Union	2:08.34	
3rd place, bronze medalist(s)	Alan Swanston	Canada	2:09.48	
4	Dawei Feng	China	2:10.24	
5	Bob Rives	United States	2:10.99	
6	Dave Town	Canada	2:11.34	
7	Kozo Tatsumi	Japan	2:11.57	
8	Stefan Mitu	Romania	2:12.08	

Men's 400 m individual medley

Rank	Name	Nationality	Time	Notes
1st place, gold medalist(s)	Sergey Fesenko, Sr.	Soviet Union	4:25.53	
2nd place, silver medalist(s)	Peter Dobson	Canada	4:31.65	
3rd place, bronze medalist(s)	Daniel Machek	Czechoslovakia	4:32.16	
4	Monte Brown	United States	4:38.08	
5	Kozo Tatsumi	Japan	4:39.36	
6	Tizoc Guemez	Mexico	4:39.43	
7	Gérard de Kort	Netherlands	4:42.19	
8	Jeffrey Riddle	Canada	4:42.59	

Men's 4×100 m freestyle relay

Rank	Nation	Athletes	Time	Notes
1st place, gold medalist(s)	United States	Jerry Spencer; Andy Schmidt; Paul Goodridge; Kris Kirschner	3:27.84	
2nd place, silver medalist(s)	Soviet Union	Yuri Prisekin; Alexey Filonov; Aleksey Markovsky; Serhiy Krasyuk	3:28.09	
3rd place, bronze medalist(s)	Brazil	Jorge Fernandes; Marcus Mattioli; Ronald Menezes; Djan Madruga	3:32.42	
4	Canada		3:33.54	
5	Japan		3:35.96	
6	Romania		3:37.75	
7	Czechoslovakia		3:39.17	
8	Poland		3:45.83	

Men's 4×200 m freestyle relay

Rank	Nation	Athletes	Time	Notes
1st place, gold medalist(s)	Soviet Union		7:33.96	GR
2nd place, silver medalist(s)	United States	Andy Schmidt; Jimmy Lee; B. McCarthy; Kris Kirschner	7:34.11	
3rd place, bronze medalist(s)	Brazil		7:38.32	
4	Canada		7:39.88	
5	Czechoslovakia		7:49.08	
6	Japan		7:52.96	
7	Romania		7:53.78	
8	Bulgaria		7:59.43	

Men's 4×100 m medley relay

Rank	Nation	Athletes	Time	Notes
1st place, gold medalist(s)	Soviet Union	Sergey Zabolotnov; Arsens Miskarovs; Sergei Kiselyov; Serhiy Krasyuk	3:48.75	
2nd place, silver medalist(s)	United States	Dave Wilson; Nicholas Nevid; Robert Placak; Kris Kirchner	3:49.55	
3rd place, bronze medalist(s)	Brazil	Rômulo Arantes; Luiz Carvalho; Marcus Mattioli; Jorge Fernandes	3:55.10	
4	Japan		3:56.18	
5	China		3:56.48	
6	Canada		3:59.79	
7	Romania		4:03.15	
8	Poland		4:07.29	

Women's 100 m freestyle

Rank	Name	Nationality	Time	Notes
1st place, gold medalist(s)	Jill Sterkel	United States	57.17	
2nd place, silver medalist(s)	Barbara Major	United States	58.28	
3rd place, bronze medalist(s)	Olga Klevakina	Soviet Union	58.65	
4	Kelly Neuber	Canada	59.38	
5	Carole Amoric	France	59.51	
6	Radosveta Chinkova	Bulgaria	1:00.05	
7	Olga Eliseeva	Soviet Union	1:00.06	
8	Kateřina Machková	Czechoslovakia	1:00.72	

Women's 200 m freestyle

Rank	Name	Nationality	Time	Notes
1st place, gold medalist(s)	Jill Sterkel	United States	2:03.97	
2nd place, silver medalist(s)	Olga Klevakina	Soviet Union	2:04.58	
3rd place, bronze medalist(s)	Irina Laricheva	Soviet Union	2:05.38	
4	Tracy Spalding	United States	2:05.58	
5	Véronique Stéphan	France	2:07.67	
6	Kelly Neuber	Canada	2:09.04	
7	Leslie Brafield	Canada	2:09.32	
8	Iwona Wejksza	Poland	2:10.51	

Women's 400 m freestyle

Rank	Name	Nationality	Time	Notes
1st place, gold medalist(s)	Kim Linehan	United States	4:15.26	
2nd place, silver medalist(s)	Irina Laricheva	Soviet Union	4:15.50	
3rd place, bronze medalist(s)	Sherri Hanna	United States	4:21.01	
4	Renata Janik	Poland	4:31.46	
5	Leslie Brafield	Canada	4:34.07	
6	Carmen Mihăilă	Romania	4:37.94	
7	Kelly Neuber	Canada	4:39.98	
8	Xu Yan	China	4:40.79	

Women's 800 m freestyle

Rank	Name	Nationality	Time	Notes
1st place, gold medalist(s)	Kim Linehan	United States	8:37.50	GR
2nd place, silver medalist(s)	Irina Laricheva	Soviet Union	8:45.01	
3rd place, bronze medalist(s)	Sherri Hanna	United States	8:46.57	
4	Renata Janik	Poland	9:19.83	
5	Carmen Mihăilă	Romania	9:24.22	
6	Xu Yan	China	9:34.01	
7	Anna Michalak	Poland	9:41.18	
8	Alejandra Colin	Mexico	10:00.89	

Women's 100 m backstroke

Rank	Name	Nationality	Time	Notes
1st place, gold medalist(s)	Carmen Bunaciu	Romania	1:02.47	GR
2nd place, silver medalist(s)	Kim Carlisle	United States	1:04.53	
3rd place, bronze medalist(s)	Susan Walsh	United States	1:04.74	
4	Irina Orliuk	Soviet Union	1:06.21	
5	Valerie Whyte	Canada	1:07.32	
6	Heike John	West Germany	1:07.51	
7	Daphne Demuth	Netherlands	1:08.91	
8	Lisa Dixon	Canada	1:09.29	

Women's 200 m backstroke

Rank	Name	Nationality	Time	Notes
1st place, gold medalist(s)	Carmen Bunaciu	Romania	2:13.21	
2nd place, silver medalist(s)	Kim Carlisle	United States	2:19.02	
3rd place, bronze medalist(s)	Susan Walsh	United States	2:19.11	
4	Irina Orliuk	Soviet Union	2:19.92	
5	Daphne Demuth	Netherlands	2:22.13	
6	Lisa Dixon	Canada	2:24.26	
7	Mihăilescu	Romania	2:26.17	
8	Valerie Whyte	Canada	2:29.92	

Women's 100 m breaststroke

Rank	Name	Nationality	Time	Notes
1st place, gold medalist(s)	Angelika Knipping	West Germany	1:14.20	
2nd place, silver medalist(s)	Liang Weifen	China	1:14.48	
3rd place, bronze medalist(s)	Lina Kačiušytė	Soviet Union	1:14.54	
4	Hong Shad	China	1:14.82	
5	Brigitte Prass	Romania	1:14.86	
6	Patricia Waters	United States	1:15.47	
7	Christine Seidl	Romania	1:15.72	
8	Irena Fleissnerová	Czechoslovakia	1:16.13	

Women's 200 m breaststroke

Rank	Name	Nationality	Time	Notes
1st place, gold medalist(s)	Lina Kačiušytė	Soviet Union	2:35.85	GR
2nd place, silver medalist(s)	Irena Fleissnerová	Czechoslovakia	2:38.64	
3rd place, bronze medalist(s)	Cindy Tuttle	United States	2:41.66	
4	Diane Johnson	United States	2:42.09	
5	Brigitte Prass	Romania	2:44.49	
6	Joanne Chevalier	Canada	2:45.94	
7	Claire Lemaire	France	2:46.78	
8	Ma Guadalupe	Mexico	2:48.58	

Women's 100 m butterfly

Rank	Name	Nationality	Time	Notes
1st place, gold medalist(s)	Jill Sterkel	United States	1:01.91	GR
2nd place, silver medalist(s)	Carol Borgmann	United States	1:02.42	
3rd place, bronze medalist(s)	Carmen Bunaciu	Romania	1:02.98	
4	Susie Woodhouse	Australia	1:03.17	
5	Valerie Whyte	Canada	1:05.88	
6	Lisa Burnes	Australia	1:05.94	
7	Susan Jenner	United Kingdom	1:05.98	
8	Hansie Geijssen	Netherlands	1:06.32	

Women's 200 m butterfly

Rank	Name	Nationality	Time	Notes
1st place, gold medalist(s)	Kim Karlisle	United States	2:15.71	
2nd place, silver medalist(s)	Susie Woodhouse	Australia	2:15.97	
3rd place, bronze medalist(s)	Mayumi Yokoyama	United States	2:17.52	
4	Lisa Burnes	Australia	2:18.27	
5	Malgorzata Rozycka	Poland	2:21.89	
6	Susan Jenner	United Kingdom	2:22.56	
7	Gizella Szlavitsek	Hungary	2:23.42	
8	Valerie Whyte	Canada	2:25.76	

Women's 200 m individual medley

Rank	Name	Nationality	Time	Notes
1st place, gold medalist(s)	Kim Carlisle	United States	2:20.43	GR
2nd place, silver medalist(s)	Olga Klevakina	Soviet Union	2:20.81	
3rd place, bronze medalist(s)	Barbara Selter	West Germany	2:24.17	
4	Diane Johnson	United States	2:24.63	
5	Irinel Pănulescu	Romania	2:25.51	
6	Mariana Paraschiv	Romania	2:25.84	
7	Lisa Dixon	Canada	2:26.55	
8	Katy Archer	United Kingdom	2:27.48	

Women's 400 m individual medley

Rank	Name	Nationality	Time	Notes
1st place, gold medalist(s)	Mayumi Yokoyama	United States	4:55.45	GR
2nd place, silver medalist(s)	Irinel Pănulescu	Romania	5:03.78	
3rd place, bronze medalist(s)	Malgorzata Rozycka	Poland	5:07.49	
4	Mariana Paraschiv	Romania	5:12.58	
	Anne Tweedy	United States	4:57.68	DSQ
	Lisa Dixon	Canada	5:05.74	DSQ
	Barbara Selter	West Germany	5:06.56	DSQ
	Daphne Demuth	Netherlands	DNS	

Women's 4×100 m freestyle relay

Rank	Nation	Athletes	Time	Notes
1st place, gold medalist(s)	United States	Annie Lett; Carol Borgmann; Barbara Major; Jill Sterkel	3:55.05	
2nd place, silver medalist(s)	Soviet Union	Irina Laricheva; Olga Eliseeva; Irina Orliuk; Olga Klevakina	3:57.64	
3rd place, bronze medalist(s)	Canada	Kelly Neuber; Leslie Brafield; Sylvie Kennedy; Valerie Whyte	4:00.59	
4	France		4:01.43	
5	Romania		4:02.97	
6	Poland		4:10.47	
7	United Kingdom		4:13.91	

Women's 4×100 m medley relay

Rank	Nation	Athletes	Time	Notes
1st place, gold medalist(s)	United States	Kim Carlisle; Patricia Waters; Jill Sterkel; Barbara Major	4:18.84	
2nd place, silver medalist(s)	Romania	Carmen Bunaciu; Brigitte Prass; Mariana Paraschiv; Irinel Pănulescu	4:22.14	
3rd place, bronze medalist(s)	Soviet Union	Irina Orliuk; Lina Kačiušytė; Olga Klevakina; Irina Laricheva	4:25.96	
4	France		4:33.06	
5	Canada		4:33.25	
6	Poland		4:37.94	
7	United Kingdom		4:41.52	

== Medal table ==
Rank	Nation	Gold	Silver	Bronze	Total
1	United States (USA)	16	7	7	30
2	Soviet Union (URS)	10	10	9	29
3	Romania (ROU)	2	2	1	5
4	Czechoslovakia (TCH)	1	1	1	3
4	West Germany (FRG)	1	1	1	3
6	Brazil (BRA)	0	3	6	9
7	Canada (CAN)	0	2	2	4
8	Australia (AUS)	0	1	0	1
8	China (CHN)	0	1	0	1
10	Poland (POL)	0	0	2	2
Totals (10 entries)		30	28	29	87
