= Swimming at the 1979 Pan American Games – Men's 200 metre freestyle =

Men's 200 metre freestyle at the 1979 Pan American Games
- Venue: Piscina Olimpica Del Escambron
- Dates: July 2 (preliminaries and finals)
- Competitors: from - nations

Medalists
Gold medal	Rowdy Gaines	United States
Silver medal	David Larson	United States
Bronze medal	Djan Madruga	Brazil

The men's 200 metre freestyle competition of the swimming events at the 1979 Pan American Games took place on 2 July at the Piscina Olimpica Del Escambron. The last Pan American Games champion was Jorge Delgado of Ecuador.

This race consisted of four lengths of the pool, all in freestyle.

== Results ==
All times shown are in minutes and seconds.

KEY:	q	Fastest non-qualifiers	Q	Qualified	GR	Games record	NR	National record	PB	Personal best	SB	Seasonal best

=== Heats ===
The first round was held on July 2.

Rank	Name	Nationality	Time	Notes
1	Rowdy Gaines	United States	1:53.25	Q
2	David Larson	United States	1:53.34	Q
3	Peter Szmidt	Canada	1:53.55	Q
4	Djan Madruga	Brazil	1:53.91	Q
5	Fernando Cañales	Puerto Rico	1:53.92	Q
6	Bill Sawchuk	Canada	1:54.53	Q
7	Marcus Mattioli	Brazil	1:55.95	Q
8	Ernesto Domenack	Peru	1:56.11	Q
9	Filiberto Colon	Puerto Rico	1:57.35	
10	Scott Newkirk	U.S. Virgin Islands	1:57.64	
11	Diego Quiroga	Ecuador	1:57.69	
12	Jean François	Venezuela	1:58.05	
13	Richard Sasser	Mexico	1:58.61	
14	Alberto Mestre	Venezuela	1:59.08	
15	Oscar González	Mexico	1:59.16	
16	Daniel Garimaldi	Argentina	2:03.21	
17	Donaldo Clough	Dominican Republic	2:03.65	NR
18	Oscar Moreno	El Salvador	2:03.84	
19	Alfredo Mackliff	Ecuador	2:03.86	
20	Ruben Martinez	El Salvador	2:05.47	
21	Jorge Sanchez	Panama	2:05.99	
22	Emilio Abreu	Panama	2:06.11	
23	Juan Tavarez	Dominican Republic	2:11.59	

=== Final ===
The final was held on July 2.

Rank	Name	Nationality	Time	Notes
1st place, gold medalist(s)	Rowdy Gaines	United States	1:51.22	
2nd place, silver medalist(s)	David Larson	United States	1:52.24	
3rd place, bronze medalist(s)	Djan Madruga	Brazil	1:52.34	SA
4	Peter Szmidt	Canada	1:53.15	
5	Fernando Cañales	Puerto Rico	1:53.57	
6	Bill Sawchuk	Canada	1:53.86	
7	Marcus Mattioli	Brazil	1:54.89	
8	Ernesto Domenack	Peru	1:55.54	NR
