= Luiz Carvalho (swimmer) =

Brazilian swimmer (born 1962)

Personal information
- Full name: Luiz Francisco Teixeira de Carvalho
- Nickname: Chico
- Born: March 22, 1962 (age 64) São Paulo, São Paulo, Brazil
- Height: 1.87 m (6 ft 2 in)
- Weight: 84 kg (185 lb)

Sport
- Sport: Swimming
- Strokes: Breaststroke
Medal record
Men's swimming
Representing Brazil
Universiade
Bronze medal – third place	1981 Bucharest	4x100m medley

Luiz Francisco Teixeira de Carvalho (born March 22, 1962, in São Paulo, Brazil, is a former breaststroke swimmer from Brazil.

He swam for Esporte Clube Pinheiros and the Brazilian National team from 1975 to 1986. Started competitive swimming when he was 10 years old, won his first age-group national title in Curitiba in early 1975. During his career, won several individual Brazilian and South American Championships and records, beating the José Sylvio Fiolo's records in the 100-meter breaststroke, and Sérgio Ribeiro's records in the 200-meter breaststroke.

He was at the 1979 Pan American Games, in San Juan, where he finished 4th in the 4×100-metre medley (beating the South American Record), 8th in the 200-meter breaststroke, and 9th in the 100-meter breaststroke.

At the 1981 Summer Universiade, held in Bucharest, he won the bronze medal in the 4×100-metre medley. Also swam 100m and 200m breaststroke.

Participated at the 1982 World Aquatics Championships in Guayaquil, where he finished 8th in the 4×100-metre medley final, 15th in the 200-metre breaststroke, and 16th in the 100-metre breaststroke. Luiz Carvalho broke the oldest Brazilian record, who was José Fiolo's record since 1972, in the 100-metre breaststroke, with a time of 1:05.77, and went to the semifinals of the competition. The 4×100-metre medley Brazilian relay was also a finalist with brand new South American record.

At the 1983 Summer Universiade, in Edmonton, he finished 8th in the 100-metre breaststroke.

He was at the 1983 Pan American Games, in Caracas. He finished 5th in the 100-metre and 200-metre breaststroke, and 4th in the 4×100-metre medley, where Brazil broke the national record.

At the 1984 Summer Olympics in Los Angeles, Carvalho finished 12th in the 4×100-metre medley, 24th in the 100-metre breaststroke, and was disqualified in the 200-metre breaststroke.

He participated at the 1985 Summer Universiade, in Kobe.

Participated at the 1986 World Aquatics Championships in Madrid, where he finished 32nd in the 200-metre breaststroke, and was disqualified in the 100-metre breaststroke.

In 1990, he went to live in the United States where he completed an MBA at UCLA Anderson School of Management.
