= Swimming at the 1978 World Aquatics Championships – Women's 100 metre freestyle =

Women's 100 metre freestyle at the 1978 FINA World Championships
- Dates: 28 August 1978 (heats); 28 August 1978 (final)
- Competitors: 45
- Winning time: 55.68 seconds

Medalists
gold medal	Barbara Krause	East Germany
silver medal	Lene Jenssen	Norway
bronze medal	Larisa Tsaryova	Soviet Union

The women's 100 metre freestyle event at the 1978 World Aquatics Championships took place 28 August.

== Results ==
=== Heats ===
Rank	Swimmer	Nation	Time	Notes
1	Barbara Krause	East Germany	55.99	CR
2	Larisa Tsaryova	Soviet Union	57.00	
3	Lene Jenssen	Norway	57.04	
4	Stephanie Elkins	United States	57.22	
5	Heike Witt	East Germany	57.41	
6	Enith Brigitha	Netherlands	57.51	
7	Birgitta Jönsson	Sweden	57.98	
8	Rebecca Perrott	New Zealand	58.01	
9	Jane Abraham	United States	58.17	
10	Wendy Quirk	Canada	58.20	
11	Olga Klevakina	Soviet Union	58.21	
12	Petra Jensurski	West Germany	58.26	
13	Marion Aizpors	West Germany	58.42	
14	Ineke Ran	Netherlands	58.52	
15	Guylaine Berger	France	58.53	
16	Guri Kogstad	Norway	58.68	
17	Rosemary Brown	Australia	58.71	
18	Carol Klimpel	Canada	58.97	
19	Sachiko Yamazaki	Japan	59.51	
20	Sharron Davies	United Kingdom	59.60	
21	Heidi Turk	United Kingdom	59.68	
22	Heidi Koch	Austria	59.75	
23	Andrea Hawcridge	New Zealand	59.94	
24	Charlotte Petersen	Denmark	1:00.63	
25	Shelley Cramer	United States Virgin Islands	1:00.63	
26	Anette Fredriksson	Sweden	1:00.69	
27	Lone Jansen	Denmark	1:00.79	
28	Natalia Más	Spain	1:01.02	
29	Hsu Yue-yun	Chinese Taipei	1:01.14	
30	Julia Lopez-Zubero	Spain	1:01.32	
31	María París	Costa Rica	1:01.41	
32	Marie Rose Verplaetse	Belgium	1:01.49	
33	Ratchaneewan Bulakul	Thailand	1:01.55	
34	Maria Guimarães	Brazil	1:01.67	
35	Lorgia Orejuela	Ecuador	1:01.74	
36	Rosanna Juncos	Argentina	1:01.95	
37	Yasmine Kummer	Luxembourg	1:02.35	
38	Wen-Hsuen Kiang	Chinese Taipei	1:02.77	
39	Nanik Jullati Soewadji	Indonesia	1:03.40	
40	Marta Slonina	Poland	1:03.65	
41	Myriam Mizouni	Tunisia	1:03.92	
42	Sumatana Pingkatswan	Thailand	1:04.26	
43	Anita Sapardjiman	Indonesia	1:05.24	
44	Ahlem Gheribi	Tunisia	1:05:59	
45	Karen Van de Graaf	Australia	DNS	

=== Final ===
Rank	Name	Nationality	Time	Notes
1st place, gold medalist(s)	Barbara Krause	East Germany	55.68	CR
2nd place, silver medalist(s)	Lene Jenssen	Norway	56.82	
3rd place, bronze medalist(s)	Larisa Tsaryova	Soviet Union	56.85	
4	Stephanie Elkins	United States	56.98	
5	Enith Brigitha	Netherlands	57.17	
6	Heike Witt	East Germany	57.49	
7	Birgitta Jönsson	Sweden	57.54	
8	Rebecca Perrott	New Zealand	58.03	
