= Swimming at the 1980 Summer Olympics – Men's 100 metre breaststroke =

Men's 100 metre breaststroke at the Games of the XXII Olympiad
- Venue: Swimming Pool at the Olimpiysky Sports Complex
- Date: 21 July (heats); 22 July (final)
- Competitors: 26 from 20 nations
- Winning time: 1:03.34

Medalists
1st place, gold medalist(s)		Duncan Goodhew	Great Britain
2nd place, silver medalist(s)		Arsens Miskarovs	Soviet Union
3rd place, bronze medalist(s)		Peter Evans	Australia

The men's 100 metre breaststroke event at the 1980 Summer Olympics in Moscow was held on 21 and 22 July at the Swimming Pool at the Olimpiysky Sports Complex.

== Records ==
Prior to this competition, the existing world and Olympic records were as follows.

World record	Gerald Mörken (FRG)	1:02.86	Jönköping, Sweden	18 August 1977
Olympic record	John Hencken (USA)	1:03.11	Montreal, Canada	20 July 1976

== Results ==
=== Heats ===
Rank	Heat	Name	Nationality	Time	Notes
1	4	Duncan Goodhew	Great Britain	1:03.48	Q
2	3	Aleksandr Fedorovsky	Soviet Union	1:03.86	Q
3	3	Arsens Miskarovs	Soviet Union	1:04.06	Q
4	2	János Dzvonyár	Hungary	1:04.55	Q
4	2	Peter Evans	Australia	1:04.55	Q
6	2	Lindsay Spencer	Australia	1:04.78	Q
7	3	Albán Vermes	Hungary	1:05.23	Q
8	2	Pablo Restrepo	Colombia	1:05.38	Q
9	1	Peter Berggren	Sweden	1:05.43	
10	4	Olivier Borios	France	1:05.67	
11	4	Jörg Walter	East Germany	1:06.12	
12	1	Miguel Santisteban	Mexico	1:06.13	
13	1	Robertas Žulpa	Soviet Union	1:06.23	
14	4	Leigh Atkinson	Great Britain	1:06.43	
15	3	Albert Boonstra	Netherlands	1:06.47	
16	3	Sérgio Ribeiro	Brazil	1:06.71	
17	1	Gustavo Torrijos	Spain	1:06.77	
18	4	Martti Järventaus	Finland	1:06.81	
19	3	Helmut Levy	Colombia	1:07.06	
20	4	Plamen Alexandrov	Bulgaria	1:07.45	
21	2	Nguyễn Mạnh Tuấn	Vietnam	1:10.07	
22	1	Djamel Yahiouche	Algeria	1:13.62	
23	3	Francisco Santos	Angola	1:18.95	
24	1	Zoë Andrianifaha	Madagascar	1:21.42	
25	2	Rogerio Silva	Mozambique	1:25.70	
	1	Mohamed El-Naser	Libya	DSQ	
	2	Andrea Ceccarini	Italy	DNS	
	4	Linos Petridis	Cyprus	DNS	

=== Final ===
Rank	Name	Nationality	Time	Notes
1st place, gold medalist(s)	Duncan Goodhew	Great Britain	1:03.34	
2nd place, silver medalist(s)	Arsens Miskarovs	Soviet Union	1:03.82	
3rd place, bronze medalist(s)	Peter Evans	Australia	1:03.96	
4	Aleksandr Fedorovsky	Soviet Union	1:04.00	
5	János Dzvonyár	Hungary	1:04.67	
6	Lindsay Spencer	Australia	1:05.04	
7	Pablo Restrepo	Colombia	1:05.91	
	Albán Vermes	Hungary	DSQ	
