= Daniel Machek =

Czech swimmer

Personal information
- Born: 10 November 1959 (age 66) Prague, Czechoslovakia

Sport
- Sport: Swimming
Medal record
Representing Czechoslovakia
Summer Universiade
Gold medal – first place	1981 Bucharest	400m freestyle
Bronze medal – third place	1981 Bucharest	400m individual medley

Daniel Machek (born 10 November 1959) is a Czech swimmer. He competed in four events at the 1980 Summer Olympics.
