= Serhiy Krasyuk =

Ukrainian swimmer (1961–1994)

Personal information
- Born: 17 November 1961 Kyiv, Ukrainian SSR, Soviet Union
- Died: July 1994 (aged 32)
- Height: 1.90 m (6 ft 3 in)
- Weight: 78 kg (172 lb)

Sport
- Sport: Swimming
- Club: Spartak Kyiv
Medal record
Representing the Soviet Union
Olympic Games
Gold medal – first place	1980 Moscow	4×200 m freestyle
Silver medal – second place	1980 Moscow	4×100 m medley
World Championships
Silver medal – second place	1982 Guayaquil	4×100 m freestyle
European Championships
Gold medal – first place	1981 Split	4×100 m medley
Gold medal – first place	1983 Rome	4×100 m freestyle
Bronze medal – third place	1981 Split	100 m freestyle
Summer Universiade
Gold medal – first place	1981 Bucharest	4x100 m freestyle
Silver medal – second place	1981 Bucharest	100 m freestyle
Silver medal – second place	1981 Bucharest	4x100 m freestyle
Friendship Games
Gold medal – first place	1984 Moscow	4×100 m freestyle
Silver medal – second place	1984 Moscow	4×200 m freestyle
Bronze medal – third place	1984 Moscow	200 m freestyle

Serhiy Oleksandrovych Krasyuk (also Sergey; Ukrainian: Сергій Олександрович Красюк; 17 November 1961 – July 1994) was a Ukrainian swimmer. He won a gold and silver medal at the 1980 Summer Olympics in the 4 × 100 m medley and 4 × 200 m freestyle relays, respectively; in both events he swam for the Soviet Unions team in the preliminary rounds. Individually he finished in sixth place in the 100 m freestyle. After the Olympics he won several medals at the world and European championships. He missed the 1984 Summer Olympics due to their boycott by the Soviet Union and competed in the Friendship Games instead, winning a gold, silver and bronze medal.
