= Jorge Fernandes (swimmer) =

Brazilian swimmer (born 1962)

Personal information
- Full name: Jorge Luiz Fernandes Leite
- Born: 3 April 1962 (age 64) Rio de Janeiro, Rio de Janeiro, Brazil
- Height: 1.88 m (6 ft 2 in)
- Weight: 87 kg (192 lb)

Sport
- Sport: Swimming
- Strokes: Freestyle
Medal record
Olympic Games
Bronze medal – third place	1980 Moscow	4x200m Freestyle
Pan American Games
Silver medal – second place	1979 San Juan	4x200m Freestyle
Silver medal – second place	1983 Caracas	4x100m Freestyle
Silver medal – second place	1983 Caracas	4x200m Freestyle
Bronze medal – third place	1987 Indianapolis	4x100m Freestyle
Bronze medal – third place	1987 Indianapolis	4x200m Freestyle
Bronze medal – third place	1987 Indianapolis	4x100m Medley
Universiade
Silver medal – second place	1981 Bucharest	200m freestyle
Bronze medal – third place	1981 Bucharest	100m freestyle
Bronze medal – third place	1981 Bucharest	4x100m freestyle
Bronze medal – third place	1981 Bucharest	4x200m freestyle
Bronze medal – third place	1981 Bucharest	4x100m medley

Jorge Luiz Fernandes Leite (born 3 April 1962 in Rio de Janeiro) is a former international freestyle swimmer from Brazil, who participated in three consecutive Summer Olympics for his native country, starting in 1980.

Participated at the 1978 World Aquatics Championships in West Berlin, where he finished 24th in the 100-metre freestyle, and 31st in the 200-metre freestyle.

He was at the 1979 Pan American Games, in San Juan. He won a silver medal in the 4×200-metre freestyle. He also finished 6th in the 100-metre freestyle. He broke the South American record of the 4×200-metre freestyle.

Fernandes won the bronze medal in the men's 4×200-metre freestyle relay event at the 1980 Summer Olympics, alongside Marcus Mattioli, Cyro Delgado, and Djan Madruga, with a time of 7:29.30. He also went to the 4×100-metre medley final, finishing 8th, and swam the 100-metre and 200-metre freestyle, not going to the final.

At the 1981 Summer Universiade, held in Bucharest, Fernandes won the silver medal in the 200-metre freestyle and bronze medal in the 100-metre freestyle. The 3 Brazilians relays (4×100-metre freestyle, 4×200-metre freestyle, 4×100-metre medley) won bronze too; Fernandes participated in all.

Participated at the 1982 World Aquatics Championships in Guayaquil, where he finished 7th in the 4×200-metre freestyle final, 8th in the 4×100-metre medley final, 19th in the 200-metre freestyle, and 26th in the 100-metre freestyle.

At the 1983 Summer Universiade, in Edmonton, he finished 7th in the 200-metre freestyle.

He was at the 1983 Pan American Games, in Caracas. He won silver in the 4×100-metre freestyle and in the 4×200-metre freestyle. He also finished 5th in the 200-metre freestyle, and 6th in the 100-metre freestyle. He broke the South American record in the 4×100-metre freestyle.

At the 1984 Summer Olympics, in Los Angeles, he finished 9th in the 4×200-metre freestyle, 10th in the 4×100-metre freestyle, and 20th in the 200-metre freestyle.

Participated at the 1986 World Aquatics Championships in Madrid, where he finished 33rd in the 200-metre freestyle, and 40th in the 100-metre freestyle.

He was at the 1987 Pan American Games, in Indianapolis. He won three bronze medals at the three Brazilian relays. He also finished 5th in the 100-metre freestyle, and 8th in the 50-metre freestyle.

At the 1988 Summer Olympics, in Seoul, he finished 10th in the 4×200-metre freestyle, 12th in the 4×100-metre freestyle, 33rd in the 100-metre freestyle, and 37th in the 50-metre freestyle.

He was the South American record holder of the 100-metre freestyle, between 1980 and 1990.
