= Peter Lang (swimmer) =

German swimmer

Personal information
- Born: 24 May 1958 (age 68) Ludwigshafen, West Germany

Sport
- Sport: Swimming
- Strokes: Breaststroke
Medal record
Representing West Germany
Summer Universiade
Silver medal – second place	1981 Bucharest	100m breaststroke

Peter Lang (born 24 May 1958) is a German former swimmer. He competed at the 1976 Summer Olympics and the 1984 Summer Olympics.
