= Arsens Miskarovs =

Latvian swimmer (born 1961)

Personal information
- Full name: Arsens Miskarovs
- Nationality: Latvian
- Born: March 3, 1961 (age 65) Jelgava, Latvian SSR, Soviet Union
- Height: 1.83 m (6 ft 0 in)
- Weight: 75 kg (165 lb)

Sport
- Sport: Swimming
- Strokes: Breaststroke
Medal record
Men's swimming
Representing the Soviet Union
Olympic Games
Silver medal – second place	1980 Moskva	100 m breaststroke
Silver medal – second place	1980 Moskva	4x100 m medley
Bronze medal – third place	1980 Moskva	200 m breaststroke
World Championships (LC)
Silver medal – second place	1978 West Berlin	200 m breaststroke
European Championships
Silver medal – second place	1977 Jönköping	200 m breaststroke
Silver medal – second place	1981 Split	100 m breaststroke
Silver medal – second place	1981 Split	200 m breaststroke
Summer Universiade
Gold medal – first place	1981 Bucharest	200 m breaststroke
Gold medal – first place	1981 Bucharest	4x100 m medley
Bronze medal – third place	1981 Bucharest	100 m breaststroke

Arsens Miskarovs (born 3 March 1961) is a Latvian former breaststroke swimmer who competed in the 1980 Summer Olympics for the Soviet Union.
