= Sergei Kiselyov (swimmer) =

Russian swimmer

Personal information
- Born: 5 February 1961 (age 65) Smolensk, Soviet Union

Sport
- Sport: Swimming
Medal record
Representing Soviet Union
Summer Universiade
Gold medal – first place	1981 Bucharest	4x100m medley relay
Bronze medal – third place	1979 Mexico City	200m butterfly
Bronze medal – third place	1981 Bucharest	100m butterfly
Bronze medal – third place	1981 Bucharest	200m butterfly

Sergei Kiselyov (born 5 February 1961) is a Russian swimmer. He competed in the men's 100 metre butterfly at the 1980 Summer Olympics.
