= Levente Mady =

Canadian swimmer

Personal information
- Born: 2 May 1959 (age 67) Arad, Romania

Sport
- Sport: Swimming
Medal record
Representing Canada
Summer Universiade
Silver medal – second place	1981 Bucharest	200m butterfly

Levente Mady (born 2 May 1959) is a Canadian former swimmer. He competed in the men's 4 × 100 metre freestyle relay at the 1984 Summer Olympics.
