= Carmen Bunaciu =

Romanian swimmer

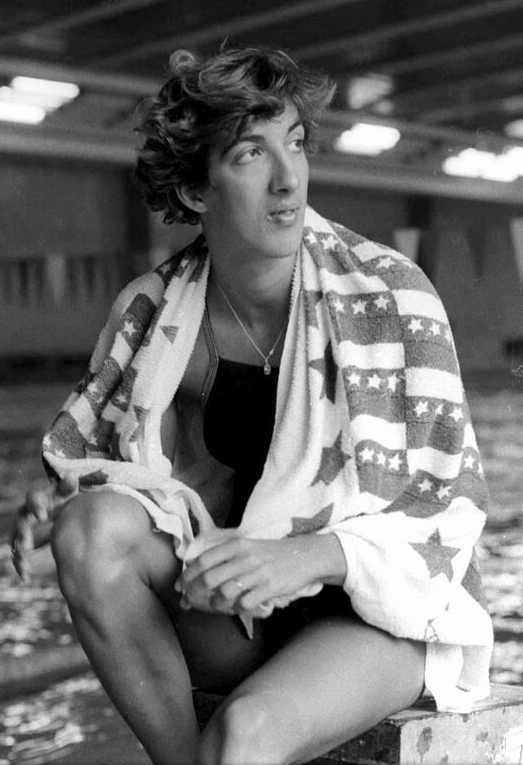
- Bunaciu in 1979

Personal information
- Born: 15 September 1961 (age 65) Sibiu, Romania
- Height: 1.91 m (6 ft 3 in)
- Weight: 78 kg (172 lb)

Sport
- Sport: Swimming
- Club: CSS Sibiu (1968–1974); Dinamo București (1974–1986)
Medal record
Representing Romania
World Championships
| Bronze medal – third place | 1982 Guayaquil | 200 m backstroke |
European Championships
| Bronze medal – third place | 1977 Jönköping | 200 m backstroke |
| Bronze medal – third place | 1981 Split | 100 m backstroke |
| Bronze medal – third place | 1983 Rome | 100 m backstroke |
Summer Universiade
| Gold medal – first place | 1979 Mexico City | 100 m backstroke |
| Gold medal – first place | 1979 Mexico City | 200 m backstroke |
| Gold medal – first place | 1981 Bucharest | 100 m backstroke |
| Gold medal – first place | 1981 Bucharest | 200 m backstroke |
| Gold medal – first place | 1985 Kobe | 100 m backstroke |
| Silver medal – second place | 1981 Bucharest | 4×100 m medley |
| Silver medal – second place | 1983 Edmonton | 100 m backstroke |
| Silver medal – second place | 1983 Edmonton | 200 m backstroke |
| Bronze medal – third place | 1981 Bucharest | 100 m butterfly |
| Bronze medal – third place | 1985 Kobe | 200 m backstroke |

Carmen Bunaciu (born 15 September 1961) is a retired Romanian swimmer who won four bronze medals in the 100 m and 200 m backstroke at the European and World Championships of 1977–1982. She also competed in these events at the 1980 and 1984 Summer Olympics and finished fourth three times.

During her career she won 70 national titles and set 39 national records; as of 2012, her record in the 50 m butterfly set in 1986 remained unbeaten. Her bronze medal in 1982 was the first Romanian swimming title at World Championships.

In 1968 she started swimming in the CSS Sibiu club, and in 1974 moved to Bucharest to study in a boarding school. There she gained 19 cm within four years, reaching a height of 1.91 m (6 ft 3 in). In 1977, she became the first Romanian female athlete to swim 100 m within one minute.

After retirement from senior swimming in 1986 she worked as a swimming coach at Dinamo București, the club where she trained for 12 years. Between 1989 and 1992 she was also the head coach of the national team. She still swims daily, but does not compete due to problems with her back.
