= Brigitte Prass =

Romanian swimmer

Personal information
- Born: 23 June 1963 (age 63) Reșița, Romania

Sport
- Sport: Swimming
Medal record
Representing Romania
Summer Universiade
Silver medal – second place	1981 Bucharest	4x100m medley relay

Brigitte Prass (born 23 June 1963) is a Romanian breaststroke swimmer. She competed in three events at the 1980 Summer Olympics.
