= Irina Laricheva =

Irina Laricheva may refer to:

- Irina Laricheva (shooter) (1964–2020), Soviet and Russian trap shooter
- Irina Laricheva (swimmer) (born 1963), Soviet swimmer
