= Yuri Presekin =

Russian swimmer (1961–2025)

Personal information
- Born: 29 October 1961 Dvurechki village, Gryazinsky District, Lipetsk Oblast, Russian SFSR, USSR
- Died: 24 August 2025 (aged 63)
- Height: 194 cm (6 ft 4 in)
- Weight: 90 kg (198 lb)

Sport
- Sport: Swimming
Medal record
Representing Soviet Union
Olympic Games
Gold medal – first place	1980 Moscow	4×200 m freestyle
Summer Universiade
Silver medal – second place	1981 Bucharest	4x100m freestyle relay

Yuri Ivanovich Presekin (Russian: Юрий Иванович Присекин; 29 October 1961 – 24 August 2025) was a Russian swimmer. He competed in the men's 4 × 200 metre freestyle relay at the 1980 Summer Olympics. Presekin died on 24 August 2025, at the age of 63.
