= Angelika Knipping =

German swimmer (born 1961)

Personal information
- Full name: Angelika Knipping
- Nationality: German
- Born: January 7, 1961 (age 65) Hagen, Nordrhein-Westfalen
- Height: 1.76 m (5 ft 9 in)
- Weight: 67 kg (148 lb)

Sport
- Sport: Swimming
- Strokes: Breaststroke
- Club: Nikar Heidelberg
- College team: University of Alabama
Medal record
Summer Universiade
Gold medal – first place	1981 Bucharest	100 m breaststroke

Angelika Knipping (born January 7, 1961) is a retired female breaststroke swimmer from Germany, who won a gold medal at the 1981 Summer Universiade in Bucharest. She represented West Germany at the 1984 Summer Olympics in Los Angeles, California.
