= Ronald Menezes =

Brazilian swimmer (born 1962)

Personal information
- Full name: Ronald Couce Menezes
- Born: 6 November 1962 (age 63) Brazil

Sport
- Sport: Swimming
- Strokes: Freestyle
Medal record
Men's swimming
Representing Brazil
Pan American Games
Silver medal – second place	1983 Caracas	4×100 m freestyle
Universiade
Bronze medal – third place	1981 Bucharest	4x100m freestyle

Ronald Couce Menezes (born 6 November 1962) is a Brazilian former freestyle swimmer.

At the 1980 South American Championships, Menezes won the 100 meters freestyle and the 200 IM medley. At the 1981 Summer Universiade, held in Bucharest, Menezes won a bronze medal in the 4×100-metre freestyle relay.

He was at the 1983 Pan American Games, in Caracas, where he won the silver medal in the 4×100-metre freestyle.

At the 1984 Summer Olympics, in Los Angeles, he finished 10th in the 4×100-metre freestyle, and 28th in the 100-metre freestyle.
