= Mariana Paraschiv =

Romanian swimmer (born 1962)

Personal information
- Born: 28 November 1962 (age 63) Bucharest, Romania

Sport
- Sport: Swimming
Medal record
Summer Universiade
Silver medal – second place	1981 Bucharest	4×100 m medley

Mariana Paraschiv (born 28 November 1962) is a Romanian butterfly and medley swimmer. She competed in three events at the 1980 Summer Olympics.
