= Kris Kirchner =

American swimmer

Personal information
- Full name: Kris Kirchner
- National team: United States
- Born: c. 1960 Solon, Ohio, U.S.
- Height: 6 ft 2 in (1.88 m)
- Weight: 180 lb (82 kg)

Sport
- Sport: Swimming
- Strokes: Freestyle
- College team: Cleveland State University; University of Texas
Medal record
Men's swimming
Representing United States
Pan American Games
Gold medal – first place	1979 San Juan	4x200 m freestyle
Universiade
Gold medal – first place	1981 Bucharest	100 m freestyle
Gold medal – first place	1981 Bucharest	4x100 m freestyle
Silver medal – second place	1981 Bucharest	4x200 m freestyle
Silver medal – second place	1981 Bucharest	4x100 m medley

Kris Kirchner (born 1960) is an American former competition swimmer who represented the United States in international events.

== International competition ==
At the 1979 Pan American Games in San Juan Puerto, Rico, he won a gold medal as a member of the winning U.S. team in the 4x200-metre freestyle relay, together with teammates Brian Goodell, David Larson and Rowdy Gaines. He qualified to be a member of the U.S. team for the 1980 Summer Olympics in Moscow, but was unable to participate as a result of the United States-led boycott of the games because of the Soviet Union's invasion of Afghanistan.

== Collegiate competition ==
He initially attended Cleveland State University, and competed for the Cleveland State Vikings in National Collegiate Athletic Association (NCAA) competition in 1977 and 1978. After the Pan American Games, he subsequently transferred to the University of Texas at Austin, where he swam for coach Eddie Reese's Texas Longhorns swimming and diving team in 1980 and 1981. He won the NCAA national championship in the 50-yard freestyle, and another in the 400-yard medley relay with teammates Clay Britt, Scott Spann and William Paulus, helping the Longhorns win their first-ever NCAA national team championship in 1981.

== Coaching ==
Kirchner was the head coach of the Indiana Hoosiers swimming and diving team, at Indiana University, from 1991 to 2002. He previously served as an assistant coach for the Texas Longhorns, and head coach for the South Carolina Gamecocks swimming and diving team at the University of South Carolina from 1986 to 1991.

== See also ==
- List of University of Texas at Austin alumni
