= Małgorzata Różycka =

Polish swimmer (born 1962)

Personal information
- Born: 27 June 1962 (age 64) Kraków, Poland

Sport
- Sport: Swimming
- Strokes: Butterfly
Medal record
Representing Poland
Summer Universiade
Bronze medal – third place	1981 Bucharest	400m individual medley

Małgorzata Różycka (born 27 June 1962) is a Polish swimmer. She competed in the women's 200 metre butterfly at the 1980 Summer Olympics.
