= Irinel Pănulescu =

Romanian swimmer

Personal information
- Born: 17 June 1964 (age 62) Ploiești, Romania

Sport
- Sport: Swimming
Medal record
Representing Romania
Summer Universiade
Silver medal – second place	1981 Bucharest	400m individual medley
Silver medal – second place	1981 Bucharest	4x100m medley relay

Irinel Pănulescu (born 17 June 1964) is a Romanian freestyle and medley swimmer. She competed in three events at the 1980 Summer Olympics.
