= Zbigniew Januszkiewicz =

Polish swimmer

Personal information
- Born: 18 August 1962 (age 63) Bydgoszcz, Poland

Sport
- Sport: Swimming
Medal record
Representing Poland
Summer Universiade
Bronze medal – third place	1981 Bucharest	200m backstroke

Zbigniew Januszkiewicz (born 18 August 1962) is a Polish swimmer. He competed in the men's 200 metre backstroke at the 1980 Summer Olympics.
