= Irina Laricheva (swimmer) =

Soviet swimmer

Personal information
- Full name: Ларичева Ирина Николаевна
- Nationality: Soviet Union
- Born: July 22, 1963 (age 62) Novosibirsk, Soviet Union
- Height: 1.78 m (5 ft 10 in)
- Weight: 64 kg (141 lb)

Sport
- Sport: Swimming
- Strokes: Freestyle
- Club: Dynamo Novosibirsk
Medal record
Swimming
Representing Soviet Union
European Championships
Bronze medal – third place	1983 Rome	400 m freestyle
Friendship Games
Silver medal – second place	1984 Moscow	400 m freestyle
Bronze medal – third place	1984 Moscow	800 m freestyle
Universiade
Gold medal – first place	1983 Edmonton	100 m freestyle
Gold medal – first place	1983 Edmonton	200 m freestyle
Gold medal – first place	1983 Edmonton	400 m freestyle
Gold medal – first place	1983 Edmonton	800 m freestyle
Gold medal – first place	1983 Edmonton	4×100 m freestyle
Gold medal – first place	1983 Edmonton	4×100 m im
Silver medal – second place	1981 Bucharest	400 m freestyle
Silver medal – second place	1981 Bucharest	800 m freestyle
Silver medal – second place	1981 Bucharest	4x100 m freestyle
Bronze medal – third place	1981 Bucharest	200 m freestyle
Bronze medal – third place	1981 Bucharest	4x100 m medley

Irina Nikolaevna Laricheva (Russian: Ирина Николаевна Ларичева; born 1963) is a retired Soviet swimmer who won a bronze medal in the 400 m freestyle at the 1983 European Aquatics Championships. The same year she won five gold medals at the Universiade. She missed the 1984 Summer Olympics due to their boycott by the Soviet Union and competed at the alternate Friendship Games instead, winning two medals in the 400 m and 800 m freestyle events.

She works as a sports coach in Grodno, Belarus, and competes in the masters category.
