= Lina Kačiušytė =

Lithuanian swimmer (born 1963)

Personal information
- Born: 1 January 1963 (age 63) Vilnius, Lithuanian SSR, Soviet Union
Medal record
Women's swimming
Representing Soviet Union
Olympic Games
Gold medal – first place	1980 Moscow	200 m breaststroke
World Championships (LC)
Gold medal – first place	1978 West Berlin	200 m breaststroke
Summer Universiade
Gold medal – first place	1981 Bucharest	200 m breaststroke
Bronze medal – third place	1981 Bucharest	100 m breaststroke
Bronze medal – third place	1981 Bucharest	4x100 m medley

Lina Kačiušytė (born 1 January 1963 in Vilnius, Lithuanian SSR) is a Lithuanian swimmer who competed for the Soviet Union, winner of a gold medal in 200 m breaststroke with the Olympic record time of 2:29:54 at the 1980 Summer Olympics.

== Biography ==
She trained at the VSS Žalgiris in Vilnius. Her first coach from 1974 to 1977, Arvydas Gražiūnas, saw her great potential and guided her in the right direction. By 1976 she was invited to train with the USSR's youth swimming team and, within a year promoted to the USSR National Team. Following another year of hard training, she was ready for the 1978 World Championships of Berlin.

She surprised everyone by winning the 200 m breaststroke and setting two world records: one in the prelims, defeating world record holder and teammate Yuliya Bogdanova, the second when winning the gold medal in the finals. She set the world record a third time the following year at the USSR vs. DDR Dual Meet in Potsdam, a record that stood from 1979 through 1985 when it was finally broken by East Germany's Silke Hörner. Kačiušytė was the first female breaststroke swimmer to go under the 2 minute 30 second barrier for the 200 meter event.

In 1998 she was inducted into the International Swimming Hall of Fame.

== See also ==
- List of members of the International Swimming Hall of Fame
