= Kim Linehan =

American swimmer (born 1962)

Personal information
- Full name: Kimberly Ann Linehan
- Nickname: "Kim"
- National team: United States
- Born: December 11, 1962 (age 63) Bronxville, New York, U.S.
- Height: 5 ft 6 in (1.68 m)
- Weight: 126 lb (57 kg)

Sport
- Sport: Swimming
- Strokes: Freestyle
- Club: Texas Longhorn Aquatic Club (TLAC)
- College team: University of Texas
- Coach: Paul Bergen (UT, TLAC)
Medal record
Women's swimming
Representing the United States
World Championships (LC)
Gold medal – first place	1982 Guayaquil	800 m freestyle
Bronze medal – third place	1978 Berlin	400 m freestyle
Bronze medal – third place	1978 Berlin	800 m freestyle
Pan American Games
Gold medal – first place	1979 San Juan	800 m freestyle
Silver medal – second place	1979 San Juan	200 m freestyle
Universiade
Gold medal – first place	1981 Bucharest	400 m freestyle
Gold medal – first place	1981 Bucharest	800 m freestyle

Kimberly Ann Linehan (born December 11, 1962) is an American former competition swimmer for the University of Texas, a 1982 World Aquatics champion, a 1984 Olympic competitor in the 400-meter freestyle, and a former world record-holder in the 400 and 1500-meter freestyle events. For a period in the late 1970s, she was considered by many to be the top distance freestyler in the world.

Born on December 11, 1962, in Bronxville, New York, to Jill and Dan Linehan, her family moved to Florida when she was seven and in the warmer climate she took to swimming. She swam through the age of 21, with eleven years in serious competitive age-group training in YMCA swimming programs in Sarasota, Florida. At a diminutive 5 feet, 4 inches at the time, she became one of the greatest female distance swimmers of the late 1970s, swimming for the Sarasota YMCA Sharks under Tim Blood. She also swam for Riverview High School in Sarasota, taking many honors and titles.

At age 15 in 1977, she moved to Austin, and began receiving training from the Texas Longhorn Aquatic Club under Hall of Fame coach Paul Bergen, where her swimming accomplishments continued to build.

At the 1978 World Aquatics Championships in Berlin, Germany, Linehan won bronze medals with third-place finishes in the 400-meter and 800-meter freestyle events. Linehan won a gold medal by placing first in the 800-meter freestyle at the 1982 World Aquatics Championships in Guayaquil, Ecuador.

== World records ==
At a high point in her career in the 1978 World Championship Long Course trials at the Woodlands in Houston, she set a world record of 4:07.66 in the 400-meter freestyle. In August 1979, she set a new world record in the 1500-meter freestyle of 16:04.49 at the 1979 Senior AAU Long Course Swimming Championships.

== University of Texas ==
Enrolling as a student at the University of Texas in the fall of 1980, on the Longhorn women's swim team Linehan was coached by Hall of Fame coaches Paul Bergen and then Richard Quick, and captured 21 All-America honors, leading the Texas women to AIAW National team Championships in 1981 and 1982. She won three NCAA individual titles each year the Texas women's team won the NCAA Championship. As a sophomore and junior, she won consecutive individual titles in the 200 butterfly, 500 freestyle and 1,650 freestyle. She completed her Junior year at UT after taking a pair of second places in the 500 and 1650-yard free, a third in the 400 IM, and fifth places in the 200 butterfly and 200 freestyle. At the end of her Junior season in March 1983, she investigated a professional offer to swim against Tracey Wickham in a series of swims, but the offer did not fully materialize, and Linehan retained her amateur standing, and later attended the 1984 Olympics.

== 1980 Olympics ==
Linehan qualified for the 1980 U.S. Olympic trials, and made the 1980 Olympic team, but though she was at the peak of her abilities, she could not attend due to the U.S. boycott of the Moscow Games. She very likely would have been favored in the 400 and 800 metre freestyle events, as the 1500 meter was not an Olympic event.

== 1984 Olympics ==
At the 1984 Summer Olympics in Los Angeles, California, she finished fourth in the women's 400-meter freestyle. She set the 400-meter freestyle world record (long course) in 1978, and held the 1,500-meter freestyle world record (long course) from 1979 to 1987.

Linehan retired from competitive swimming following the 1984 Olympics and returned to her home state of Florida, where she attended the University of South Florida. She completed a Bachelor's Degree in Elementary Education from Bradley University in Peoria, Illinois. Later, she served as a social worker and health care administrator in Peoria. In April 2005, she served as an honorary meet director at the Normal Community High School National Internet Distance Meet in Normal, Illinois which featured elite swimmers from the U.S. Championship trials in the 1500 meter event. After her swimming career ended, by 2008, she had taken up running as an athletic sideline.

== Honors ==
She was inducted into the International Swimming Hall of Fame as an "Honor Swimmer" in 1997, and the University of Texas Women's Athletics Hall of Honor in 2008.

== See also ==
- List of members of the International Swimming Hall of Fame
- List of University of Texas at Austin alumni
- List of World Aquatics Championships medalists in swimming (women)
- World record progression 400 metres freestyle
- World record progression 1500 metres freestyle

Records
Preceded by Tracey Wickham	Women's 1,500-meter freestyle world record-holder (long course); August 19, 1979 – July 31, 1987	Succeeded by Janet Evans
Preceded by Petra Thümer	Women's 400-meter freestyle world record-holder (long course); August 2, 1978 – August 24, 1978	Succeeded by Tracey Wickham
