= Aleksandr Fedorovsky =

Russian swimmer (born 1959)

Personal information
- Born: 17 April 1959 (age 67) Snezhinsk, Russia
- Height: 1.89 m (6 ft 2 in)
- Weight: 86 kg (190 lb)

Sport
- Sport: Swimming
- Club: Trud (1976–1978); Dynamo Moscow (1979–1981)
Medal record
Representing Soviet Union
Olympic Games
| Silver medal – second place | 1980 Moscow | 4×100 m medley |
Summer Universiade
| Bronze medal – third place | 1981 Bucharest | 200 m breaststroke |

Aleksandr Olegovich Fedorovsky (Russian: Александр Олегович Федоровский; born 17 April 1959) is a retired Russian swimmer. He competed at the 1980 Summer Olympics, where he won a silver medal in the 4 × 100 m medley relay and finished fourth in the 100 m breaststroke event. In 1978 and 1979, he won the national championship in the 100 m breaststroke.
