= Swimming at the 1979 Pan American Games =

The Swimming Tournament at the 1979 Pan American Games took place in the Piscina Olimpica del Escambron in San Juan, Puerto Rico from July 2 to July 8, 1979.

Three world records were broken at this edition of the Games, all by U.S. swimmers.

== Men’s events ==
Event	Gold		Silver		Bronze	
100 m freestyle	David McCagg (USA)	50.77	Fernando Cañales (PUR)	51.25	John Newton (USA)	51.45
200 m freestyle	Rowdy Gaines (USA)	1:51.22	David Larson (USA)	1:52.24	Djan Madruga (BRA)	1:52.34
400 m freestyle	Brian Goodell (USA)	3:53.01	Djan Madruga (BRA)	3:57.46	Peter Szmidt (CAN)	3:58.34
1500 m freestyle	Brian Goodell (USA)	15:24.36	Djan Madruga (BRA)	15:41.74	Bobby Hackett (USA)	15:46.83
100 m backstroke	Bob Jackson (USA)	56.66	Rômulo Arantes (BRA)	57.20	Steve Pickell (CAN)	57.89
200 m backstroke	Peter Rocca (USA)	2:00.98	Jesse Vassallo (USA)	2:02.07	Djan Madruga (BRA)	2:04.74
100 m breaststroke	Steve Lundquist (USA)	1:03.82	Greg Winchell (USA)	1:04.76	Graham Smith (CAN)	1:05.66
200 m breaststroke	Steve Lundquist (USA)	2:21.97	John Simmons (USA)	2:22.45	Pablo Restrepo (COL)	2:23.13
100 m butterfly	Robert Placak (USA)	55.54	Dan Thompson (CAN)	55.56	Clay Evans (CAN)	56.63
200 m butterfly	Craig Beardsley (USA)	2:00.49	George Nagy (CAN)	2:02.15	Bill Sawchuk (CAN)	2:02.93
200 m individual medley	Jesse Vassallo (USA)	2:03.29; WR	Graham Smith (CAN)	2:05.86	Scott Spann (USA)	2:06.29
400 m individual medley	Jesse Vassallo (USA)	4:21.63	Bill Sawchuk (CAN)	4:30.21	Alex Baumann (CAN)	4:32.42
4 × 100 m freestyle relay	UNITED STATES; Rowdy Gaines; Jack Babashoff; John Newton; David McCagg	3:23.71	CANADA; Graham Welbourn; Alan Swanston; Bill Sawchuk; Peter Szmidt	3:29.64	BRAZIL; Cyro Marques; Djan Madruga; Marcus Mattioli; Rômulo Arantes	3:30.86
4 × 200 m freestyle relay	UNITED STATES; Brian Goodell; David Larson; Kris Kirchner; Rowdy Gaines	7:31.28	BRAZIL; Cyro Marques; Djan Madruga; Jorge Fernandes; Marcus Mattioli	7:38.92	CANADA; Peter Szmidt; Graham Welbourn; Rob Bayliss; Bill Sawchuk	7:39.27
4 × 100 m medley relay	UNITED STATES; Bob Jackson; Steve Lundquist; Bob Placak; David McCagg	3:47.20	CANADA; Steve Pickell; Graham Smith; Dan Thompson; Bill Sawchuk	3:50.02	PUERTO RICO; Carlos Berrocal; Orlando Catinchi; Arnaldo Pérez; Fernando Cañales	3:54.63

== Women's events ==
Event	Gold		Silver		Bronze	
100 m freestyle	Cynthia Woodhead (USA)	56.22	Jill Sterkel (USA)	56.24	Gail Amundrud (CAN)	57.79
200 m freestyle	Cynthia Woodhead (USA)	1:58.43; WR	Kim Linehan (USA)	2:01.92	Gail Amundrud (CAN)	2:03.38
400 m freestyle	Cynthia Woodhead (USA)	4:10.56	Tracy Caulkins (USA)	4:16.13	Wendy Quirk (CAN)	4:17.34
800 m freestyle	Kim Linehan (USA)	8:39.82	Jennifer Hooker (USA)	8:50.71	Barbara Shockey (CAN)	8:54.82
100 m backstroke	Linda Jezek (USA)	1:03.33	Cheryl Gibson (CAN)	1:05.17	Teresa Rivera (MEX)	1:06.87
200 m backstroke	Linda Jezek (USA)	2:16.07	Cheryl Gibson (CAN)	2:17.58	Libby Kinkead (USA)	2:20.19
100 m breaststroke	Tami Paumier (USA)	1:12.20	Tracy Caulkins (USA)	1:12.52	Anne Gagnon (CAN)	1:14.38
200 m breaststroke	Anne Gagnon (CAN)	2:35.75	Joanne Bédard (CAN)	2:40.22	Patricia Speeds (USA)	2:40.79
100 m butterfly	Jill Sterkel (USA)	1:00.53	Lisa Buese (USA)	1:00.59	Nancy Garapick (CAN)	1:02.96
200 m butterfly	Mary T. Meagher (USA)	2:09.77; WR	Karinne Miller (USA)	2:15.05	Nancy Garapick (CAN)	2:16.40
200 m individual medley	Tracy Caulkins (USA)	2:16.11	Nancy Garapick (CAN)	2:19.36	Anne Tweedy (USA)	2:20.33
400 m individual medley	Tracy Caulkins (USA)	4:46.05	Anne Tweedy (USA)	4:47.19	Nancy Garapick (CAN)	4:53.37
4 × 100 m freestyle relay	UNITED STATES; Stephanie Elkins; Tracy Caulkins; Jill Sterkel; Cynthia Woodhead	3:45.82	CANADA; Gail Amundrud; Carol Klimpel; Anne Jardin; Wendy Quirk	3:50.18	MEXICO; Teresa Rivera; Isabel Reuss; Yvonne Guerrero; Helen Plachinski	4:02.05
4 × 100 m medley relay	UNITED STATES; Linda Jezek; Tracy Caulkins; Jill Sterkel; Cynthia Woodhead	4:13.24	CANADA; Cheryl Gibson; Anne Gagnon; Nancy Garapick; Gail Amundrud	4:20.16	MEXICO; Teresa Rivera; Elke Holtz; Helen Plachinski; Inez Guerrero	4:30.59

== Medal table ==
Rank	Nation	Gold	Silver	Bronze	Total
1	United States	28	12	6	46
2	Canada	1	12	15	28
3	Brazil	0	4	3	7
4	Puerto Rico	0	1	1	2
5	Mexico	0	0	3	3
6	Colombia	0	0	1	1
Totals (6 entries)		29	29	29	87
