= Marcus Mattioli =

Brazilian swimmer (born 1960)

Personal information
- Full name: Marcus Laborne Mattioli
- Born: 18 October 1960 (age 65) Belo Horizonte, Minas Gerais, Brazil
- Height: 1.81 m (5 ft 11 in)
- Weight: 75 kg (165 lb)

Sport
- Sport: Swimming
- Strokes: Freestyle and Butterfly
Medal record
Olympic Games
Bronze medal – third place	1980 Moscow	4x200m Freestyle
Pan American Games
Silver medal – second place	1979 San Juan	4x200m Freestyle
Bronze medal – third place	1979 San Juan	4x100m Freestyle
Universiade
Bronze medal – third place	1981 Bucharest	4x100m freestyle
Bronze medal – third place	1981 Bucharest	4x100m medley

Marcus Laborne Mattioli (born 18 October 1960 in Belo Horizonte) is a former international freestyle and butterfly swimmer from Brazil, who participated in the 1980 Summer Olympics for his native country. There he won the bronze medal in the men's 4×200-metre freestyle relay event at the 1980 Summer Olympics, alongside Jorge Fernandes, Cyro Delgado, and Djan Madruga.

Participated at the 1978 World Aquatics Championships in West Berlin, where he finished 34th in the 100-metre freestyle, and 29th in the 200-metre freestyle.

He was at the 1979 Pan American Games, in San Juan. He won a silver medal in the 4×200-metre freestyle, and a bronze medal in the 4×100-metre freestyle. He also finished 7th in the 200-metre freestyle, and 13th in the 100-metre freestyle. He broke the South American record of the 4×200-metre freestyle.

Mattioli won the bronze medal in the men's 4×200-metre freestyle relay event at the 1980 Summer Olympics, alongside Jorge Fernandes, Cyro Delgado, and Djan Madruga, with a time of 7:29.30. He also swam the 100-metre butterfly, 200-metre butterfly and 200-metre freestyle, not going to the final.

At the 1981 Summer Universiade, held in Bucharest, Mattioli won two bronze medals in the 4×100-metre freestyle and 4×100-metre medley relays.

Participated at the 1986 World Aquatics Championships in Madrid, where he finished 29th in the 200-metre butterfly, and 39th in the 100-metre butterfly.

Mattioli still swim, now breaking world records in the Masters category.
