= Nicholas Nevid =

American swimmer (born 1960)

Personal information
- Full name: Nicholas Nevid
- Nickname: "Nick"
- National team: United States
- Born: 1960 (age 65–66)

Sport
- Sport: Swimming
- Strokes: Breaststroke, medley
- Club: Nashville Aquatic Club
- College team: University of Texas
Medal record
Men's swimming
Representing the United States
World Championships
Gold medal – first place	1978 Berlin	200 m breaststroke
Gold medal – first place	1978 Berlin	4×100 m medley
Universiade
Gold medal – first place	1981 Bucharest	100 m breaststroke
Silver medal – second place	1981 Bucharest	200 m breaststroke
Silver medal – second place	1981 Bucharest	4×100 m medley

Nicholas Nevid (born 1960) is a retired world-champion American swimmer. He is now a physiologist with a strong interest in marine biology.

Nick grew up in Elm Grove, Wisconsin. His sister is Nancy Nevid Kryka, a member of the Minnesota Masters Swimming Hall of Fame. His brother is the medal-winning triathlete Nathan "Nate" Nevid.

== Swimming ==
Nevid attended the University of Texas, where he was a member of the Texas Longhorns swimming and diving team and the Nashville Aquatic Club.

Among his most notable accomplishments as a breaststroke swimmer:

- winning two gold medals at the 1978 World Aquatics Championships in Berlin
- winning two gold medals and one silver medal in the 1981 Universiade at Bucharest, Romania
- breaking the American record in the 200 yard breaststroke
- becoming a four-time College All-American Swimmer at the University of Texas
- winning three gold medals at the 1981 USS Long Course Nationals
- being a member of the University of Texas' 1981 NCAA Men's Swimming/Diving Championship-Team

Because of the 1980 Summer Olympics boycott, he was unable to compete in the 1980 Olympics.

He coached swimming for one year at Auburn University; for one year with the Las Vegas Gold team, led by Olympic Gold Medalist Rowdy Gaines; for two years with the Columbus Aquatic Club in Columbus, Georgia; and for one year at Louisiana State University.

== Education ==
Nick attended Brookfield Central High School (Brookfield, Wisconsin); Brentwood Academy (Brentwood, Tennessee); and Austin High School (Austin, Texas), from which he graduated in 1979.

He earned a B.A. degree in biology from the University of Texas in 1983.

In 1993, he earned a Ph.D. degree in physiology from Louisiana State University.

== Physiology and marine biology ==
Dr. Nick Nevid has raised marine foodfish in offshore aquaculture cages in the Bahamas and Panama. He also developed Proaquatix, which was the second largest producer of marine ornamental fish in the world.

His research includes original work on biofouling prevention.

Among his publications/patents:

- Circadian Neuroendocrine Regulation of Scale Allograft Reactions in Gulf Killifish, Fundulus Grandis
- "Prolactin signaling through stat proteins"
- "Base for propagating aquatic animals"
- "Nonphotic stimuli alter a day-night rhythm of allograft rejection in gulf killifish"
- "Timed daily administrations of hormones and antagonists of neuroendocrine receptors alter day-night rhythms of allograft rejection in the gulf killifish, Fundulus grandis"
- "A day-night rhythm of immune activity during scale allograft rejection in the gulf killifish, Fundulus grandis."
- "Annexin Gene Structure"
- "Time-dependent effects of daily thermoperiods, feeding, and disturbances on scale allograft survival in the gulf killifish, Fundulus grandis"
- "Biofouling prevention by induction heating"
