= Djan Madruga =

Brazilian swimmer (born 1958)

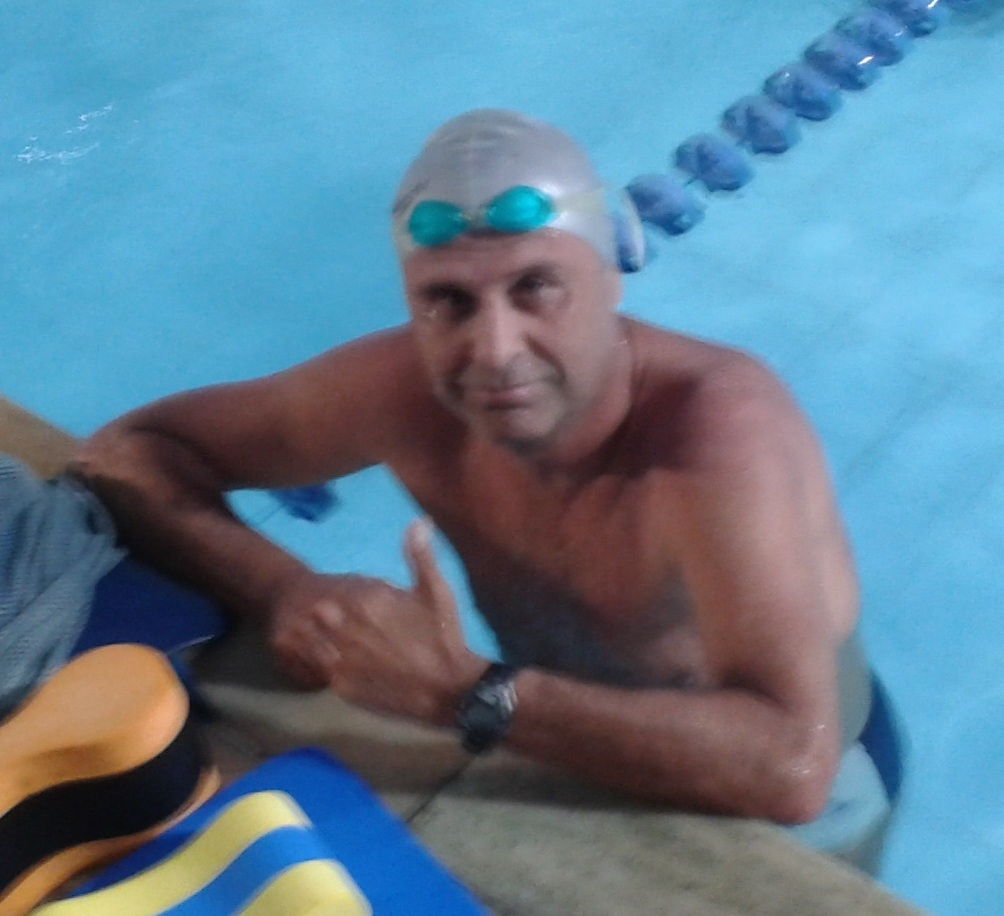
- Madruga in 2015

Personal information
- Full name: Djan Garrido Madruga
- Born: 7 December 1958 (age 67) Rio de Janeiro, Brazil
- Height: 1.81 m (5 ft 11 in)
- Weight: 69 kg (152 lb)

Sport
- Sport: Swimming
- Strokes: Freestyle, Backstroke
Medal record
Men's swimming
Representing Brazil
Olympic Games
| Bronze medal – third place | 1980 Moscow | 4x200m Freestyle |
Pan American Games
| Silver medal – second place | 1979 San Juan | 400m Freestyle |
| Silver medal – second place | 1979 San Juan | 1500m Freestyle |
| Silver medal – second place | 1979 San Juan | 4x200m Freestyle |
| Silver medal – second place | 1983 Caracas | 4x100m Freestyle |
| Silver medal – second place | 1983 Caracas | 4x200m Freestyle |
| Bronze medal – third place | 1975 Mexico City | 400m Freestyle |
| Bronze medal – third place | 1975 Mexico City | 1500m Freestyle |
| Bronze medal – third place | 1975 Mexico City | 4x200m Freestyle |
| Bronze medal – third place | 1979 San Juan | 200m Freestyle |
| Bronze medal – third place | 1979 San Juan | 200m Backstroke |
| Bronze medal – third place | 1979 San Juan | 4x100m Freestyle |
Universiade
| Gold medal – first place | 1979 Mexico City | 400m medley |
| Silver medal – second place | 1979 Mexico City | 200m backstroke |
| Silver medal – second place | 1981 Bucharest | 400m freestyle |
| Silver medal – second place | 1981 Bucharest | 200m backstroke |
| Bronze medal – third place | 1981 Bucharest | 200m freestyle |
| Bronze medal – third place | 1981 Bucharest | 4x100m freestyle |
| Bronze medal – third place | 1981 Bucharest | 4x200m freestyle |

Djan Garrido Madruga (born 7 December 1958) is a Brazilian former freestyle swimmer and former South American record-holder. His younger brother Roger Madruga, was also a professional swimmer.

== Early life ==
Madruga was born on 7 December 1958 in Rio de Janeiro. At 6 years of age, he usually played on Copacabana Beach with a friend. As a result of him nearly drowning, his father Dirceu Madruga enrolled him in the Federal University of Rio de Janeiro (UFRJ) swimming school at Urca. He wanted his son to be able to play in the water safely, but soon Djan Madruga's instructor realized that the boy had a gift for swimming and recommended him for the Botafogo de Futebol e Regatas team. In the petiz category, he improved his technique in all styles, particularly in the backstroke, where he won his first medals.

However, by 11 years, Djan had become discouraged as his opponents had out-grown him, and the following year was frustrated when he lost a poll for the South American Championship. Djan decided to change clubs, and joined the Fluminense FC where he began to work with a new swimming coach. Under the guidance of Denir de Freitas, Djan now loved to train and a period of impressive developments began, when they concentrated on distance events.

== International career ==
=== 1973–1975 ===
In 1973, at the age of 15 he won a place in the Brazil squad that competed in the South American Championships, in Medellín, Colombia and the following year he competed in both the Canadian Championship and the U.S. Open, in California. The structure, scale and technical levels were a surprise to Djan Madruga, and he returned to Brazil determined to work hard to come back, and win.

In 1975, while competing in the III Latin Swimming Cup, at Las Palmas, Spain, he did a time of 15:56.20, becoming the first South American to swim the 1500-metre freestyle under 16 minutes. He also qualified for participation in the Montreal Olympics. The same year he competed at the 1975 World Aquatics Championships in Cali. In the 1500-metre freestyle, he led the race up to 1000 meters, but then got tired and lost power, finishing 11th. Djan did a time of 16:30.77, far from his South American record of 15:56.02. The head of the Brazilian delegation, Rubens Dinard, said Djan had "too much responsibility for being written in only one test, and by the time of inscription he had. Moreover, the Brazilians had problems with the training conducted in winter, where the most cooled down, unable to train normally". Djan also competed at the 1975 Pan American Games, in Mexico City, where he won the bronze medal in the 400-metre, 1500-metre and 4×200-metre freestyle, finishing 4th in the 200-metre freestyle race.

=== 1976 Summer Olympics ===
At the Montreal 1976 Summer Olympics, Djan Madruga competed in two finals, finishing in 4th place in the 400-metre freestyle with a time of 3:57.18 and in the 1500-metre freestyle where his time was 15:19.84. During the competition before the finals, he became the first Brazilian to beat an Olympic record in swimming, and the first in the World to swim the 400-metre freestyle in the Olympics, under 4 minutes, when he swam his 400-metre freestyle qualifying heats in 3:59.62. He was to break the South American record in the 400-metre freestyle twice; in the heats, and in the finals, while in the 1500-metre freestyle, Djan Madruga improved his best time by 36 seconds.

As a result of his Olympics successes, Djan received several offers of scholarships to universities, in the United States. These represented a spectacular opportunity for a number of reasons. Firstly, Djan Madruga's father had been an engineer in Petrobras, before the Brazilian military coup of 1964. Afterwards he was forced to take a job as a taxi driver making it difficult to provide for his family and to purchase exercise equipment. He had to send his children to a public school. Secondly, the logistics of everyday life in Rio de Janeiro made it difficult for Djan to travel to his swimming club and college. Precious time was wasted which should have been spent training, studying or resting. Thirdly, Djan was training alone at Fluminense, but in the U.S., he would train with colleagues at the highest level, and with a leading coach who was at the forefront of knowledge in biomechanics and physiology. And finally, studying at an American university would open up many more possibilities for Djan's working life, after his athletics career. He chose Indiana University, studying physical education and training with Doc Counsilman, Mark Spitz's coach.

=== 1977–1980 ===
Djan Madruga went to Mission Viejo in 1977, to train with the renowned U.S. swimming coach, Mark Schubert, where he shared the pool with the Olympic champion and record holder Brian Goodell.

The following year he participated at the 1978 World Aquatics Championships in West Berlin, where he won 6th place in his heat of the 1500-metre freestyle race, but failed to finish in the final, also failing to qualify for the final of the 400-metre freestyle. These poor performances, were due to Djan contracting Pharyngitis at Bordeaux, France, just before the World Championships. On their way to Berlin, the Brazilian swim team made this stopover to train with the French national team, and to adapt to the new time zone.

In 1979, he successfully competed in the Pan American Games in San Juan, where he won three silver medals; in the 400-metre, the 1500-metre, and the 4×200-metre freestyle. He also won three bronze medals; in the 200-metre freestyle, the 200-metre backstroke, and the 4×100-metre freestyle. He was beaten in the 400-metre and 1500-metre freestyle races, by the world record holder Brian Goodell. However, in both the 200-metre freestyle and in the relays, he broke the South American records. He also competed at the 1979 Summer Universiade, in Mexico City, where he won the gold medal in the 400-metre individual medley, and the silver medal in the 200-metre backstroke.

At the U.S. Open in April 1980 at Austin, Texas, Djan Madruga won the 800-metre freestyle and the 400-metre individual medley races, in the process achieving a goal he had set in Montreal 1976, by defeating the Olympic champion Brian Goodell. Djan broke the South American record in the 400-metre freestyle (3:53.91), in the 800-metre freestyle (7:59.85 the second best of all time), and in the 400-metre individual medley (4:25.30). In recognition of his achievements his picture appeared in Swimming World, the highly influential magazine.

=== 1980 Summer Olympics ===
Djan Madruga competed in the 1980 Summer Olympics, in Moscow, where he won the bronze medal in the men's 4×200-metre freestyle relay event, with Jorge Fernandes, Cyro Delgado, and Marcus Mattioli in a time of 7:29.30. He qualified for the 400-metre freestyle final finishing 4th (3:54.15), the 400-metre individual medley finishing 5th (4:26.81), but failed to qualify for the 1500-metre freestyle final.

The 30-hour flight from Los Angeles to Moscow, left just five days to acclimatize and adjust to the new time zone, before the swimming competition began. Just before his first race the 1500-metre freestyle, Djan accidentally cut his foot. He failed to qualify, swimming 34 seconds worse than his time at the U.S. Open. It was a huge blow and a shock to his Brazilian fans. The 4x200-metre freestyle relay was next, but the team's 200-metre results did not indicate much chance of winning a medal. But Jorge Fernandes, Cyro Delgado and Marcus Mattioli all swam two seconds faster than they had in their individual events, and Djan finished like a champion, holding opponents and leading the team to Olympic podium, to win the bronze medal. They had swum 7:29.30, three seconds faster than the heats, and nine seconds faster than the previous South American record, set at the Pan American Games in San Juan. Their Moscow record stood for 12 years. Djan Madruga went on to qualify for the 400-metre freestyle final with the 3rd best time, narrowly coming 4th (3:54.15), 20 hundredths behind third placed. Swimming in lane 1 in the 400-metre individual medley; he was first at the end of the backstroke, lost ground in the breaststroke, and held on in the crawl to finish in 5th place (4:26.81).

=== 1981–1983 ===
At the 1981 Summer Universiade, held in Bucharest, Djan Madruga won the silver medal in both the 400-metre freestyle and the 200-metre backstroke. He also won the bronze medal in the 200-metre freestyle. The 3 Brazilians relays (4×100-metre freestyle, 4×200-metre freestyle, 4×100-metre medley) won bronze too; Djan participated in the 4×100-metre freestyle and 4×200-metre freestyle.

Djan Madruga competed at the 1982 World Aquatics Championships in Guayaquil, Ecuador, where he finished 7th in the 4×200-metre freestyle final, 10th in the 200-metre backstroke, and 12th in the 400-metre freestyle. Unfortunately he had competed while suffering from a serious health problem. Djan had contracted typhoid. Ricardo Prado was critical of their accommodation and the food. "The hotel we stayed at was not well attended. It was directly across [from] the Guayaquil bus station. I managed to reach the final of the 200-metre individual medley, but I was weak because food there was terrible, and finished the race in eighth place." Prado returned home with gold in the neck and a big mycosis in the belly.

Djan was well enough to compete at the 1983 Pan American Games, in Caracas, Venezuela, where he won silver in both the 4×100-metre freestyle and the 4×200-metre freestyle events.

=== 1984 Summer Olympics ===
Djan Madruga attended his third Olympic Games, the 1984 Summer Olympics in Los Angeles where he finished 9th in the 4×200-metre freestyle, 10th in the 4×100-metre freestyle, and 12th in the 200-meter backstroke events.

== Marks and records ==
Djan Madruga was one of the greatest swimmers in the history of Brazil. He was an early prodigy; at 15 years of age competing in the South American Championships and the U. S. Open in 1973 and 1974, he began his domination of long distance events on the South American continent. In August 1974, he became the South American record holder in the 400-metre, 800-metre and 1500-metre freestyle during competition in Ottawa, Canada. In April 1975 he broke the 16 minutes barrier in the 1500-metre freestyle at Copa America in Las Palmas. At 16 he was the South American record holder of the 200-metre, the 400-metre, the 800-metre and the 1500-metre freestyle events. In 1979 Djan Magruga became the one and only Brazilian swimmer to simultaneously hold the records in all freestyle distances from 100- to 1500-metre. He also held the South American records in the 200-metre backstroke, the 200-metre individual medley, and the 400-metre individual medley, as well as holding the Brazilian record in the 200-metre butterfly.

Djan Madruga was the first South American to swim the 1500-metre freestyle event in under 16 minutes (1975), the 800-metre freestyle event in under 8 minutes (1980) and the 400-metre freestyle event in under 4 minutes (1976).

He was first Brazilian to beat an Olympic record in swimming, with a time of 3:59.62 during qualifying heats in the 400-metre freestyle, in Montreal 1976.

In April 1980, while training with the USA team, he broke the South American record for the 800-metre freestyle with a time of 7:59.85, the second swimmer in history to break the 8 minute the barrier, after Vladimir Salnikov, the world record holder. This record stood for 29 years. It was broken in 2009 by Luiz Arapiraca wearing a new technology super-suit manufactured by Jaked in Italy. As a result, Djan Madruga offered a reward of $5,000.00 to anyone who could beat this record without wearing a super-suit.

Djan Madruga also held the South American record for the 1500-metre freestyle for 19 years from 1976, until Luiz Lima, broke it in 1995, and the South American record for the 400-metre freestyle for 17 years, from April 1980 until it was equaled by Luiz Lima in 1997. He broke seven times the South American record in the 400-metre freestyle.

== After professional swimming ==
Between 1983 and 1987 Djan Madruga was a professional triathlete. During this time he won the following titles:

two times Brazilian middle distance champion,
runner-up at the U.S. in the Olympic distance,
champion of the International Triathlon, Sendai, Japan.

He competed in the Ironman Hawaii in 1984, where he broke the record of swimming stage (3.8 km), finishing 126th from 1500 competitors. In 1990 he returned to swim in the Master category, winning 12 world titles, and breaking three world records.

For two years he was the National Secretary of Sports of the Federal government of Brazil with special responsibility for the Bolsa-Atleta program. He also participated in the campaign to bring the 2016 Summer Olympics to Rio de Janeiro, when he assisted in planning and in presentations made to the International Olympic Committee.

Djan Madruga owns a swimming academy in Rio de Janeiro built in the 1990s in the Recreio dos Bandeirantes neighborhood.
