= Peter Knust =

German swimmer (born 1960)

Personal information
- Born: 14 September 1960 (age 65) Salzgitter, West Germany
- Height: 1.95 m (6 ft 5 in)
- Weight: 72 kg (159 lb)

Sport
- Sport: Swimming
Medal record
Representing West Germany
World Championships
Silver medal – second place	1978 Berlin	4×100 m freestyle
Bronze medal – third place	1978 Berlin	4×200 m freestyle
European Championships
Silver medal – second place	1977 Jönköping	4×200 m freestyle
Bronze medal – third place	1981 Split	4×100 m freestyle

Peter Knust (born 14 September 1960) is a retired German swimmer who won four medals in freestyle relays at the European and world championships in 1977, 1978 and 1981.
