= Frank Wennmann =

German swimmer

Personal information
- Born: 1959 (age 66–67)

Sport
- Sport: Swimming
Medal record
Representing West Germany
World Championships
Bronze medal – third place	1978 Berlin	4×200 m freestyle
European Championships
Silver medal – second place	1977 Jönköping	400 m freestyle
Silver medal – second place	1977 Jönköping	4×200 m freestyle
Silver medal – second place	1981 Split	4×200 m freestyle

Frank Wennmann (born 1959) is a retired German swimmer who won four medals at the European and world championships in 1977–1981, three of them in the 4 × 200 m freestyle relay. Between 1978 and 1980 he also won three national titles in the 200 m and 400 m freestyle events.
