= Joan Pennington =

American swimmer

Personal information
- Full name: Joan Pennington
- National team: United States
- Born: 1960 (age 65–66) Franklin, Tennessee, U.S.

Sport
- Sport: Swimming
- Strokes: Backstroke, butterfly, individual medley
- College team: University of Texas
Medal record
Women's swimming
Representing the United States
World Championships (LC)
Gold medal – first place	1978 Berlin	100 m butterfly
Gold medal – first place	1978 Berlin	4×100 m medley
Silver medal – second place	1978 Berlin	200 m medley
Pan American Games
Silver medal – second place	1983 Caracas	100 m backstroke

Joan Pennington (born c. 1960) is an American former competition swimmer who won one silver and two gold medals at the 1978 World Aquatics Championships. She qualified for the 1980 Summer Olympics, but could not participate because of the United States-led boycott of the Moscow Olympics.

Pennington attended the University of Texas, and swam for the Texas Longhorns swimming and diving team in Association for Intercollegiate Athletics for Women (AIAW) and National Collegiate Athletic Association (NCAA) competition. During her college swimming career she won eight AIAW and NCAA championships and received 28 All-American honors. She was the recipient of the Honda Sports Award for Swimming and Diving, recognizing her as the outstanding college female swimmer of 1978–79.

She had a two-year break from swimming from 1980 to 1982 and finally retired in 1984. She received her master's degree in health promotion and exercise science from Vanderbilt University, and a doctorate degree in preventive health care at the School of Public Health, Loma Linda University in California.

== See also ==
- List of University of Texas at Austin alumni
- List of Vanderbilt University people
- List of World Aquatics Championships medalists in swimming (women)
