= Per-Ola Quist =

Swedish swimmer

Medal record

Men's swimming

Representing Sweden

World Championships (LC)
Bronze medal – third place	1978 Berlin	4×100 m freestyle

Per-Ola Quist (born 18 February 1961 in Malmö, Skåne County) is a former Swedish Olympic swimmer. He competed in the 1980 Summer Olympics, where he swam the 200 m freestyle and the 4×200 m freestyle relay.

== Clubs ==
- Helsingborgs SS
