= Larisa Tsaryova =

Russian swimmer

Personal information
- Born: 10 August 1958 (age 67) Tallinn, Estonia
- Height: 1.72 m (5 ft 8 in)
- Weight: 56 kg (123 lb)

Sport
- Sport: Swimming
- Club: Burevestnik Moscow
Medal record
Women's swimming
Representing Soviet Union
World Championships
Bronze medal – third place	1978 Berlin	100 m freestyle
Bronze medal – third place	1978 Berlin	200 m freestyle
Bronze medal – third place	1978 Berlin	4×100 m medley
European Championships
Silver medal – second place	1977 Jönköping	4×100 m medley

Larisa Nikolayevna Tsaryova (also Tsareva, Russian: Лариса Николаевна Царёва; born 10 August 1958) is a retired Russian swimmer who won three bronze medals at the 1978 World Aquatics Championships. She competed in five events at the 1976 and 1980 Summer Olympics and finished fourth in the 4 × 100 m medley relay and fifth in the 4 × 100 m freestyle relay in 1976. In 1980, her freestyle relay was disqualified for improper changeover.

She won three Soviet Championship titles in 1976 – 100 m freestyle, 4 x 100 m freestyle and 4 x 100 m combined and 100 m freestyle title in 1978. Currently, she is a deputy director of an Olympic boarding school in Moscow.
