= Karsten Lippmann =

German swimmer

Personal information
- Born: 21 June 1958 (age 68) Hanover, West Germany

Sport
- Sport: Swimming
Medal record
Representing West Germany
World Championships
Bronze medal – third place	1978 Berlin	4×200 m freestyle

Karsten Lippmann (born 21 June 1958 in Hanover, West Germany) is a retired German swimmer who won a bronze medal in the 4 × 200 m freestyle relay at the 1978 World Aquatics Championships.

Lippmann works as a swimming coach in Hannover. His father was an engineer and his mother was a secretary. His brother Ulrich is also a former competitive swimmer.
