= Sergey Fesenko Sr. =

Soviet swimmer (born 1959)

Personal information
- Native name: Сергей Леонидович Фесенко
- Full name: Serhiy Leonidovych Fesenko
- Nationality: Soviet
- Born: 29 January 1959 (age 67) Kryvyi Rih, Ukrainian SSR, Soviet Union
- Height: 1.88 m (6 ft 2 in)
- Weight: 77 kg (170 lb)

Sport
- Sport: Swimming
- Strokes: Butterfly and medley
Medal record
Men's swimming
Representing the Soviet Union
Olympic Games
Gold medal – first place	1980 Moscow	200 m butterfly
Silver medal – second place	1980 Moscow	400 m medley
World Championships (LC)
Silver medal – second place	1978 Berlin	400 m medley
Silver medal – second place	1982 Guayaquil	200 m butterfly
Bronze medal – third place	1982 Guayaquil	400 m medley
European Championships (LC)
Gold medal – first place	1977 Jönköping	400 m medley
Gold medal – first place	1981 Split	400 m medley
Silver medal – second place	1983 Rome	200 m butterfly
Bronze medal – third place	1981 Split	200 m butterfly
Summer Universiade
Gold medal – first place	1981 Bucharest	200 m butterfly
Gold medal – first place	1981 Bucharest	200 m medley
Gold medal – first place	1981 Bucharest	400 m medley
Gold medal – first place	1983 Edmonton	200 m butterfly
Friendship Games
Silver medal – second place	1984 Moscow	200 metre butterfly

Serhiy Leonidovych Fesenko (Сергей Леонидович Фесенко, born 29 January 1959) is a Soviet swimmer. He competed at the 1980 Olympic Games in Moscow, where he won the gold medal in 200 m butterfly.

He graduated from Kiev University of Physical Education. He competed for the "Avangard" Club (Kiev). Honored Master of Sports of USSR (1978). Champion 1980 Olympic Games in 200 m butterfly (1.59,76). Silver medalist of the Olympic Games 1980 in 400 meter individual medley (4.23,43). Silver medalist at 1978 World Swimming Championships and 1982 FINA World Swimming Championships in 200 meters butterfly. Bronze in 1982 FINA World Swimming Championships in 400 meter individual medley. 1977 and 1981 European Championship champion in 400 meter individual medley. Silver medalist of the 1983 European Championship in 200 m butterfly. Bronze medalist of the 1981 European Championship in 200 meter butterfly. The winner of the competition at the European Cup 1979, 1981 in the 200 meter butterfly, 1982 in 400 meter medley. The winner of the World Universiade 1981 and 1983 in the 200 meter butterfly, 1981 in 200 and 400 meter individual medley. USSR Championship 1977, 1978, 1979, 1980, 1981, 1982, 1983.

Fesenko is the father of Ukrainian swimmer Serhiy Fesenko Jr.
