= Ramona Reinke =

German swimmer

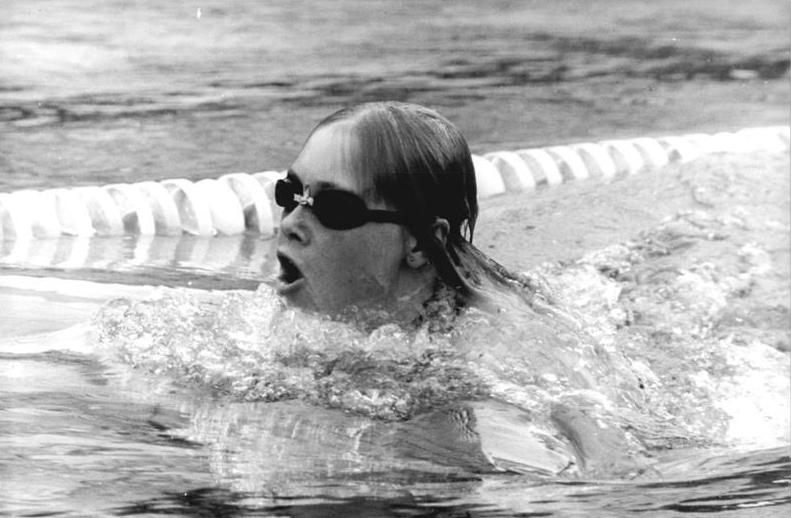
- Reinke in 1978

Sport
- Sport: Swimming
- Club: SC DHfK Leipzig
Medal record
Representing East Germany
World Championships
Silver medal – second place	1978 Berlin	4×100 m medley
European Championships
Bronze medal – third place	1977 Jönköping	100 m breaststroke

Ramona Reinke is a retired German swimmer who won a silver medal in the 4 × 100 m medley relay at the 1978 World Aquatics Championships and a bronze medal in the 100 m breaststroke at the 1977 European Aquatics Championships. Between 1977 and 1978 she won three national titles in the 100 m and 200 m breaststroke.
