= Cyro Delgado =

Brazilian swimmer (born 1961)

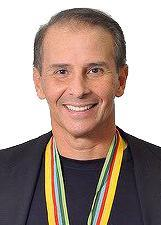

Personal information
- Full name: Cyro Marques Delgado
- Born: 11 May 1961 (age 65) União da Vitória, Paraná, Brazil
- Height: 1.82 m (6 ft 0 in)
- Weight: 76 kg (168 lb)

Sport
- Sport: Swimming
- Strokes: Freestyle
Medal record
Men's swimming
Representing Brazil
Olympic Games
Bronze medal – third place	1980 Moscow	4×200 m freestyle
Pan American Games
Silver medal – second place	1979 San Juan	4×200 m freestyle
Silver medal – second place	1983 Caracas	4×100 m freestyle
Silver medal – second place	1983 Caracas	4×200 m freestyle
Bronze medal – third place	1979 San Juan	4×100 m freestyle
Bronze medal – third place	1987 Indianapolis	4×100 m freestyle
Bronze medal – third place	1987 Indianapolis	4×200 m freestyle

Cyro Marques Delgado (born 11 May 1961 in União da Vitória) is a Brazilian former freestyle swimmer.

== Awards and medals ==
He was at the 1979 Pan American Games, in San Juan. He won silver in the 4×200-metre freestyle, and bronze in the 4×100-metre freestyle. He also finished 4th in the 4×100-metre medley. He broke the South American record in all three events.

At the 1980 Summer Olympics, in Moscow, he won a bronze medal in the 4×200-metre freestyle relay, with a time of 7:29.30, along Jorge Fernandes, Marcus Mattioli and Djan Madruga. He also swam the 100-metre and 200-metre freestyle, but failed to reach the finals in these events. In the 4×100-metre medley, he broke the South American record at heats, with a time of 3:53.32, helping Brazil to reach the final.

Participated at the 1982 World Aquatics Championships in Guayaquil, where he finished 7th in the 100-metre freestyle final, 7th in the 4×200-metre freestyle final, 8th in the 4×100-metre medley final, and 15º in the 200-metre freestyle.

He was at the 1983 Pan American Games, in Caracas. He won silver in the 4×100-metre freestyle and in the 4×200-metre freestyle. He also finished 5th in the 100-metre freestyle, and 8th in the 200-metre freestyle. He broke the South American record in the 4×100-metre freestyle.

At the 1984 Summer Olympics, in Los Angeles, his best achievement was ninth place in the same 4×200-metre freestyle relay event. He also finished 10th in the 4×100-metre freestyle, 12th in the 4×100-metre medley, 18th in the 100-metre freestyle, and 21st in the 200-metre freestyle.

Participated at the 1986 World Aquatics Championships in Madrid, where he finished 27th in the 50-metre freestyle, and 31st in the 100-metre freestyle.

He was at the 1987 Pan American Games, in Indianapolis. He won bronze in the 4×100-metre freestyle and in the 4×200-metre freestyle.

After retirement from swimming he took leading positions in Brazilian sports management, such as president of State Council of Sports (Conselho Estadual de Desportos), president of Committee of Sports Projects (Comissão de Projetos Esportivos Incentivados) and president of the National Olympics Committee (Comissão de Atletas Olímpicos).
