= Bob Jackson (swimmer) =

American swimmer (born 1957)

Personal information
- Full name: Robert Scott Jackson
- Nickname: "Bob"
- National team: United States
- Born: March 5, 1957 (age 69) Alhambra, California, U.S.
- Height: 6 ft 4 in (1.93 m)
- Weight: 190 lb (86 kg)

Sport
- Sport: Swimming
- Strokes: Backstroke
- Club: Camden Swim Club
- College team: University of Arizona
Medal record
Men's swimming
Representing the United States
World Championships
Gold medal – first place	1978 Berlin	100m Backstroke
Gold medal – first place	1978 Berlin	4×100m Medley
Pan American Games
Gold medal – first place	1979 San Juan	100m backstroke
Gold medal – first place	1979 San Juan	4×100m medley
Silver medal – second place	1975 Mexico City	100m backstroke
Bronze medal – third place	1975 Mexico City	200m backstroke

Robert Scott Jackson (born March 5, 1957) is an American former competition swimmer who represented the United States at the 1976 Summer Olympics in Montreal, Quebec. He placed sixth in the final of the men's 100-meter backstroke with a time of 57.69 seconds. Two years later he won the gold medal in the same event at the 1978 World Aquatics Championships in Berlin, Germany.

== See also ==
- List of University of Arizona people
- List of World Aquatics Championships medalists in swimming (men)
