= William Paulus =

American swimmer

Personal information
- Full name: William Paulus
- National team: United States

Sport
- Sport: Swimming
- Strokes: Butterfly
- College team: University of Texas
Medal record
World University Games
Gold medal – first place	1981 Bucharest	100m butterfly

William Paulus is an American former competition swimmer and world record-holder. In 1980, he qualified for the U.S. Olympic team; however, he did not attend the Olympics due to the United States-led boycott of the 1980 Summer Olympics in Moscow. Paulus' times from the 1980 U.S. Olympic Trials would have won two gold medals at the 1980 Olympics. He held the 100-meter butterfly world record from 1981 to 1983.

Paulus grew up in Fort Worth, Texas, and went to college at the University of Texas on a swimming scholarship in the early 1980s. While at Texas, he earned All-American honors from 1980 to 1983. He was a five-time Southwest Conference champion in the 50-yard butterfly (1982, 1983); 100-yard butterfly (1980, 1983), and 200-yard butterfly (1980); and was part of Texas's NCAA champion 4x100-yard medley relay teams in 1981 and 1982.

After college, Paulus received his dental degree from Baylor College of Dentistry in Dallas. His orthodontic residency was at Saint Louis University Medical Center. Paulus graduated with honors in June 1994 and immediately went into practice with his father, Peter Paulus, who has since retired. He is a Diplomate and board certified member of the American Association of Orthodontists.

== See also ==
- List of University of Texas at Austin alumni
- World record progression 100 metres butterfly

Records
Preceded by Pär Arvidsson	Men's 100-meter butterfly world record-holder (long course); April 3, 1981 – August 6, 1983	Succeeded by Matt Gribble
