= Graham Welbourn =

Canadian swimmer

Personal information
- Born: January 11, 1961 (age 65) Club= Canadian Dolphin Swim Club
Medal record
Men's swimming
Representing Canada
Pan American Games
Silver medal – second place	1979 San Juan	4x100m Freestyle
Bronze medal – third place	1979 San Juan	4x200m Freestyle

Graham Welbourn (born January 11, 1961) is a Canadian swimmer. He competed in the freestyle events during the 1970s and early 1980s. He was supposed to represent his native country at the 1980 Summer Olympics, but didn't start due to the international boycott of the Moscow Games. A resident of Claresholm, Alberta he won a total number of two medals at the 1979 Pan American Games.

== See also ==
- List of Commonwealth Games medallists in swimming (men)
