= Tracey Wickham =

Australian swimmer

Tracey Wickham MBE OAM
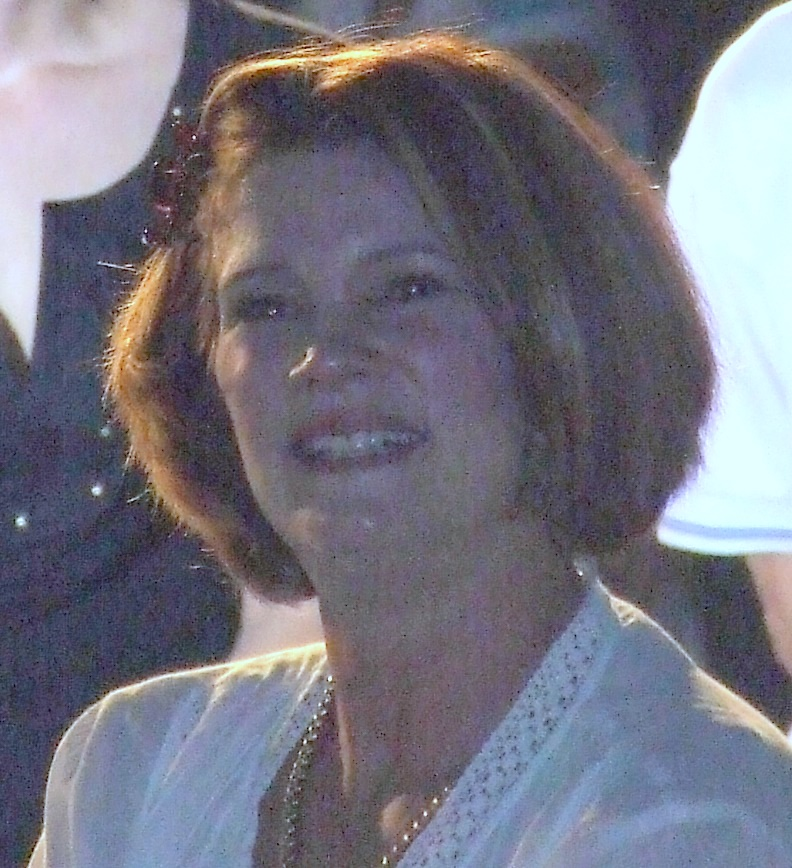

Personal information
- Full name: Tracey Lee Wickham
- Nickname: Tiger
- National team: Australia
- Born: 24 November 1962 (age 63)
- Height: 1.63 m (5 ft 4 in)

Sport
- Sport: Swimming
- Strokes: Freestyle
Medal record
Women's swimming
Representing Australia
World Championships (LC)
Gold medal – first place	1978 Berlin	400 m freestyle
Gold medal – first place	1978 Berlin	800 m freestyle
Commonwealth Games
Gold medal – first place	1978 Edmonton	400 m freestyle
Gold medal – first place	1978 Edmonton	800 m freestyle
Gold medal – first place	1982 Brisbane	400 m freestyle
Gold medal – first place	1982 Brisbane	800 m freestyle
Silver medal – second place	1978 Edmonton	200 m freestyle
Silver medal – second place	1978 Edmonton	4×100 m medley
Silver medal – second place	1982 Brisbane	200 m freestyle
Bronze medal – third place	1978 Edmonton	4×100 m freestyle

Tracey Lee Wickham MBE, OAM (born 24 November 1962 in Rosebud, Victoria) is an Australian former middle distance swimmer. Wickham was the World Champion for the 400 m and 800 m freestyle in 1978, and won gold in both events at the 1978 and 1982 Commonwealth Games. She is a former world record holder for the 400 m, 800 m and 1500 m freestyle. Despite her success in the pool, Wickham has battled hardship and personal tragedy throughout her life.

== Swimming career ==
Wickham began swimming at the age of eight at John Rigby's pool in Brisbane and mastered her technique under the guidance of Peter Diamond. At the age of thirteen, she was selected to be on the Australian team for the 1976 Montreal Olympic Games but failed to reach the finals at that meet.

In 1977, Wickham's family moved to California, where she trained for six months with coaching legend Mark Schubert. She returned to Brisbane at the end of 1977 and she came under the guidance of coach Bill Sweetenham at the Commercial Swimming Club. On 8 February 1978, Wickham broke her first world record, the 1500 m freestyle, in a solo swim at the Fortitude Valley Pool in Brisbane, clocking 16:14.93.

At the 1978 Commonwealth Games in Edmonton, Alberta, Canada, Wickham won both the 400 m and 800 m freestyle. That same year, she set world records in both events, and won both the 400 m and 800 m freestyle at the 1978 Berlin World Championships, setting a world 400 m record of 4.06.28, which stood as the Championship record until 2007. Both world records stood until 1987, long after her retirement.

In 1980, Australia decided against an official boycott of the 1980 Summer Olympics. A number of Australian athletes elected to boycott the Games personally. Wickham maintains that she withdrew from the team because of illness, as she was suffering glandular fever at the time, not because of the boycott. The 800 m freestyle was won by fellow Australian Michelle Ford at that meet.

Wickham retired at the end of 1979 due to financial problems. The policy of amateurism was upheld by the Amateur Swimming Union of Australia during this period, meaning Wickham could neither earn money from the sport nor receive any prizes. Wickham returned to swimming in the early 1980s under coach Laurie Lawrence. She won gold in the 400 m and 800 m freestyle at the 1982 Commonwealth Games, where she took the Athletes Oath at the Opening Ceremony. Her gold medal for the 400 m was presented to her by Queen Elizabeth II and Wickham retired from swimming immediately afterwards. Wickham returned to competitive swimming again in May 1990, following the birth of her daughter, with Lawrence again as her coach. That year she was first woman in the 7.6 km open water race from Magnetic Island to Townsville. She also won the female division of the Lake Trasimeno 20 km marathon race. She retired for good following the birth of her son in January 1992.

== Personal life ==
She was educated at the All Hallows' School, in Brisbane along with her sisters Julie and Kelly. Wickham married in 1986 and had two children, Daniel and Hannah. She divorced her husband in the mid-1990s.

Her daughter, Hannah, died at the age of nineteen from synovial sarcoma on 2 October 2007. Wickham is an ambassador for Hannah's Chance Foundation, which supports teenage cancer victims.

== Honours and awards ==
Wickham was awarded the 1978 World Trophy for Australasia as the best athlete in the region.

On 30 December 1978, Wickham was made a Member of the Order of the British Empire.

On 10 December 1985, she was inducted into the Sport Australia Hall of Fame, and was inducted into the International Swimming Hall of Fame at Fort Lauderdale in 1992.

On 25 October 2000, she was awarded the Australian Sports Medal for outstanding contribution as a competitor in swimming.

On 13 June 2005, she was awarded the Medal of the Order of Australia for service to Australian swimming and to the development of young swimmers through teaching and coaching roles.

== Swimming achievements ==
- 1976 Montreal Olympic Games
  - Team member
- 1978 Edmonton Commonwealth Games
  - 400 metres freestyle - gold medal
  - 800 metres freestyle - gold medal
  - 200 metres freestyle - silver medal
  - 4 x 100-metre medley relay (butterfly leg) - silver medal
  - 4 x 100-metre freestyle relay - bronze medal
- 1978 Berlin World Championships
  - 400 metres freestyle - gold medal
  - 800 metres freestyle - gold medal
- 1982 Brisbane Commonwealth Games
  - 400 metres freestyle - gold medal
  - 800 metres freestyle - gold medal
  - 200 metres freestyle - silver medal
- 1990 Magnetic Island to Townsville Swim
  - First place
- 1990 Italian Gran Fondo Marathon Lake Swim
  - First place

== Book ==
- Tracey Wickham's biography Treading Water: My Life in And Out of the Pool by Peter Meares was published by Random House Australia October 2010.

== See also ==
- List of members of the International Swimming Hall of Fame
- Commonwealth Games records in swimming
- List of World Aquatics Championships medalists in swimming (women)
- List of Commonwealth Games medallists in swimming (women)
- World record progression 400 metres freestyle
- World record progression 800 metres freestyle
- World record progression 1500 metres freestyle

Records
Preceded by Alice Browne	Women's 1500 metres freestyle world record holder (long course); 8 February 1978 – 19 August 1979	Succeeded by Kim Linehan
Preceded by Michelle Ford	Women's 800 metres freestyle world record holder (long course); 21 February 1978 – 27 July 1987	Succeeded by Janet Evans
Preceded by Kim Linehan	Women's 400 metres freestyle world record holder (long course); 24 August 1978 – 20 December 1987	Succeeded by Janet Evans
