= Miguel Santisteban =

Mexican swimmer

Personal information
- Born: 22 February 1960 (age 66)

Sport
- Sport: Swimming

Miguel Santisteban (born 22 February 1960) is a Mexican swimmer. He competed in two events at the 1980 Summer Olympics.
