= Heike Witt =

East German swimmer

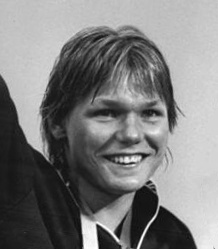
- Heike Witt in 1978

Sport
- Sport: Swimming
- Club: SC Dynamo Berlin
Medal record
Representing East Germany
World Championships
Silver medal – second place	1978 Berlin	4×100 m freestyle

Heike Witt is a retired German swimmer who won a silver medal in the 4×100 m freestyle relay at the 1978 World Aquatics Championships. She also won three national titles between 1977 and 1979 in this event.
