= Per-Alvar Magnusson =

Swedish swimmer

Medal record

Men's swimming

Representing Sweden

World Championships (LC)
Bronze medal – third place	1978 Berlin	4×100 m freestyle

European Championships (LC)
Bronze medal – third place	1981 Split	4×200 m freestyle

Per-Alvar Magnusson (1958-2009) was a Swedish Olympic swimmer. Born on 29 June 1958 in Bollnäs, Gävleborg, he competed in the 4×200 m freestyle relay and the 4×100 m medley relay in the 1980 Summer Olympics. He died on 2 April 2009 in Sweden.

== Clubs ==
- Upsala SS
