= Stephanie Elkins =

American swimmer (born c. 1963)

Personal information
- Full name: Stephanie W. Elkins
- National team: United States
- Born: c. 1963 (age 62–63)

Sport
- Sport: Swimming
- Strokes: Freestyle
- Club: Cincinnati Marlins
- College team: Stanford University
Medal record
Women's swimming
Representing the United States
World Championships (LC)
Gold medal – first place	1978 Berlin	4×100 m freestyle
Pan American Games
Gold medal – first place	1979 San Juan	4×100 m freestyle

Stephanie W. Elkins (born c. 1963) is an American former competition swimmer who won a gold medal in the 4×100-meter freestyle relay at the 1978 World Aquatics Championships, setting a new world record. She won another gold medal in the same event at the 1979 Pan American Games. She qualified for the 1980 Summer Olympics, again in the 4×100-meter freestyle, but could not participate due to the boycott of the Moscow Olympics led by the United States.

Elkins attended Stanford University, and swam for the Stanford Cardinal swimming and diving team in National Collegiate Athletic Association (NCAA) competition. She graduated from Stanford with a bachelor's degree in organizational behavior.

== Career ==
Since 1985, she has worked in sale and leasing of office and R&D buildings. She was a vice president of Colliers International. She now works at Coldwell Banker Residential real estate teaming with Hugh Cornish in luxury properties in Atherton/Portola Valley/Woodside and Menlo Park

== See also ==
- List of World Aquatics Championships medalists in swimming (women)
- World record progression 4 × 100 metres freestyle relay
