= 1978 World Aquatics Championships =

1978 edition of the World Aquatics Championships

3rd FINA World Championships
- Host city: West Berlin
- Date: August 20–28, 1978

The 1978 World Aquatics Championships took place in the free city of West Berlin between August 20 and August 28, 1978. Women's Water Polo competed as an exhibition sport.

== Medal table ==
Place	Nation	1st place, gold medalist(s)	2nd place, silver medalist(s)	3rd place, bronze medalist(s)	Total
1	United States	23*	14	7	44
2	Soviet Union	6	4	6	16
3	Canada	3	1	5	9
4	Australia	2	0	0	2
5	East Germany	1	10	4	15
6	West Germany	1	2	4	7
7	Italy	1	0	1	2
8	Japan	0	2	1	3
9	Hungary	0	1	2	3
10	Yugoslavia	0	1	1	2
11	Norway	0	1	0	1
11	New Zealand	0	1	0	1
13	Great Britain	0	0	2	2
13	Sweden	0	0	2	2
15	Brazil	0	0	1	1
15	Denmark	0	0	1	1
Total		37	37	37	111

- Record(*)

== Results ==
=== Diving ===
Men

Event	Gold	Silver	Bronze
3 m springboard	Phil Boggs (USA)	Falk Hoffmann (GDR)	Giorgio Cagnotto (ITA)
10 m platform	Greg Louganis (USA)	Falk Hoffmann (GDR)	Vladimir Aleynik (URS)

Women

Event	Gold	Silver	Bronze
3 m springboard	Irina Kalinina (URS)	Cynthia Potter (USA)	Jennifer Chandler (USA)
10 m platform	Irina Kalinina (URS)	Martina Jäschke (GDR)	Melissa Briley (USA)

=== Swimming ===
Men

Event	Gold	Silver	Bronze
100 m freestyle	David McCagg (USA)	Jim Montgomery (USA)	Klaus Steinbach (FRG)
200 m freestyle	Bill Forrester (USA)	Rowdy Gaines (USA)	Sergey Kopliakov (URS)
400 m freestyle	Vladimir Salnikov (URS)	Jeff Float (USA)	Bill Forrester (USA)
1500 m freestyle	Vladimir Salnikov (URS)	Borut Petrič (YUG)	Bobby Hackett (USA)
100 m backstroke	Bob Jackson (USA)	Peter Rocca (USA)	Romulo Arantes (BRA)
200 m backstroke	Jesse Vassallo (USA)	Gary Hurring (NZL)	Zoltán Verrasztó (HUN)
100 m breaststroke	Walter Kusch (FRG)	Graham Smith (CAN)	Gerald Mörken (FRG)
200 m breaststroke	Nick Nevid (USA)	Arsens Miskarovs (URS)	Walter Kusch (FRG)
100 m butterfly	Joe Bottom (USA)	Greg Jagenburg (USA)	Pär Arvidsson (SWE)
200 m butterfly	Mike Bruner (USA)	Steve Gregg (USA)	Roger Pyttel (GDR)
200 m individual medley	Graham Smith (CAN)	Jesse Vassallo (USA)	Aleksandr Sidorenko (URS)
400 m individual medley	Jesse Vassallo (USA)	Sergey Fesenko (URS)	András Hargitay (HUN)
4 × 100 m freestyle relay	United States (USA); Jack Babashoff; Rowdy Gaines; Jim Montgomery; David McCagg	West Germany (FRG); Andreas Schmidt; Ulrich Temps; Peter Knust; Klaus Steinbach	Sweden (SWE); Per Holmertz; Dan Larsson; Per-Ola Quist; Per-Alvar Magnusson
4 × 200 m freestyle relay	United States (USA); Bruce Furniss; Bill Forrester; Bobby Hackett; Rowdy Gaines	Soviet Union (URS); Sergey Rusin; Andrey Krylov; Vladimir Salnikov; Sergey Kopliakov	West Germany (FRG); Andreas Schmidt; Peter Knust; Karsten Lippmann; Frank Wennmann
4 × 100 m medley relay	United States (USA); Bob Jackson; Nick Nevid; Joe Bottom; David McCagg	West Germany (FRG); Klaus Steinbach; Walter Kusch; Michael Kraus; Andreas Schmidt	Great Britain (GBR); Gary Abraham; Duncan Goodhew; John Mills; Martin Smith

Women

Event	Gold	Silver	Bronze
100 m freestyle	Barbara Krause (GDR)	Lene Jenssen (NOR)	Larisa Tsaryova (URS)
200 m freestyle	Cynthia Woodhead (USA)	Barbara Krause (GDR)	Larisa Tsaryova (URS)
400 m freestyle	Tracey Wickham (AUS)	Cynthia Woodhead (USA)	Kim Linehan (USA)
800 m freestyle	Tracey Wickham (AUS)	Cynthia Woodhead (USA)	Kim Linehan (USA)
100 m backstroke	Linda Jezek (USA)	Birgit Treiber (GDR)	Cheryl Gibson (CAN)
200 m backstroke	Linda Jezek (USA)	Birgit Treiber (GDR)	Cheryl Gibson (CAN)
100 m breaststroke	Yuliya Bogdanova (URS)	Tracy Caulkins (USA)	Margaret Kelly (GBR)
200 m breaststroke	Lina Kačiušytė (URS)	Yuliya Bogdanova (URS)	Susanne Nielsson (DEN)
100 m butterfly	Joan Pennington (USA)	Andrea Pollack (GDR)	Wendy Quirk (CAN)
200 m butterfly	Tracy Caulkins (USA)	Nancy Hogshead (USA)	Andrea Pollack (GDR)
200 m individual medley	Tracy Caulkins (USA)	Joan Pennington (USA)	Ulrike Tauber (GDR)
400 m individual medley	Tracy Caulkins (USA)	Ulrike Tauber (GDR)	Petra Schneider (GDR)
4 × 100 m freestyle relay	United States (USA); Tracy Caulkins; Stephanie Elkins; Jill Sterkel; Cynthia Woodhead	East Germany (GDR); Heike Witt; Caren Metschuck; Barbara Krause; Petra Priemer	Canada (CAN); Gail Amundrud; Nancy Garapick; Sue Sloan; Wendy Quirk
4 × 100 m medley relay	United States (USA); Linda Jezek; Tracy Caulkins; Joan Pennington; Cynthia Woodhead	East Germany (GDR); Birgit Treiber; Ramona Reinke; Andrea Pollack; Barbara Krause	Soviet Union (URS); Elena Kruglova; Yuliya Bogdanova; Irina Aksenova; Larisa Tsaryova

=== Synchronised swimming ===
Event	Gold	Silver	Bronze
Solo routine	Helen Vanderburg (CAN)	Pam Tryon (USA)	Yasuko Unezaki (JPN)
Duet routine	Michelle Calkins (CAN); Helen Vanderburg (CAN)	Masako Fujiwara (JPN); Yasuko Fujiwara (JPN)	Michele Barone (USA); Pam Tryon (USA)
Team routine	United States (USA)	Japan (JPN)	Canada (CAN)

=== Water polo ===
Men

Event	Gold	Silver	Bronze
Team	Italy	Hungary	Yugoslavia
