= Rowdy Gaines =

American swimmer (born 1959)

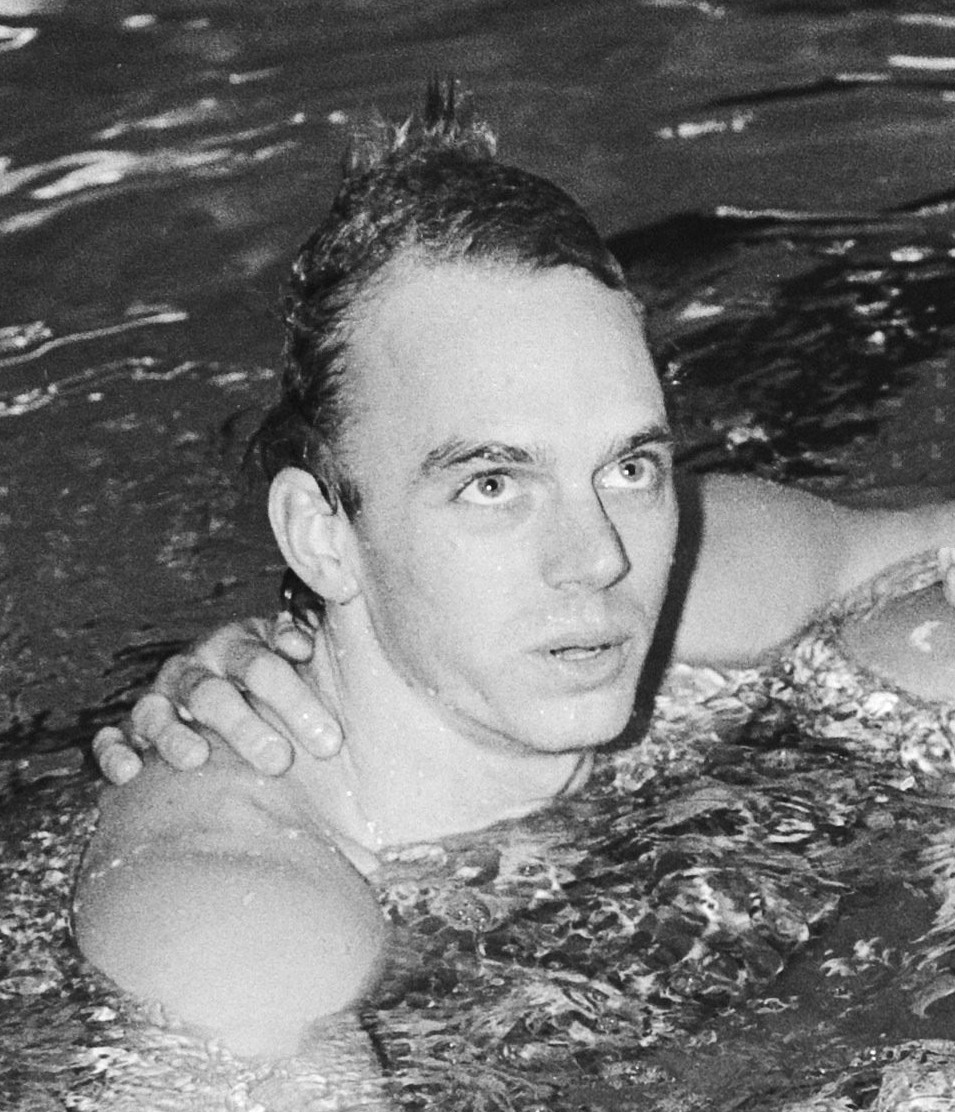
- Gaines in 1983

Personal information
- Full name: Ambrose Gaines IV
- Nickname: "Rowdy"
- National team: United States
- Born: February 17, 1959 (age 67) Winter Haven, Florida, U.S.
- Height: 6 ft 1 in (185 cm)
- Weight: 161 lb (73 kg)

Sport
- Sport: Swimming
- Strokes: Freestyle
- College team: Auburn University
Medal record
Representing the United States
Men's swimming
Olympic Games
Gold medal – first place	1984 Los Angeles	100 m freestyle
Gold medal – first place	1984 Los Angeles	4×100 m freestyle
Gold medal – first place	1984 Los Angeles	4×100 m medley
World Championships (LC)
Gold medal – first place	1978 Berlin	4×100 m freestyle
Gold medal – first place	1978 Berlin	4×200 m freestyle
Gold medal – first place	1982 Guayaquil	4×100 m freestyle
Gold medal – first place	1982 Guayaquil	4×200 m freestyle
Gold medal – first place	1982 Guayaquil	4×100 m medley
Silver medal – second place	1978 Berlin	200 m freestyle
Silver medal – second place	1982 Guayaquil	100 m freestyle
Silver medal – second place	1982 Guayaquil	200 m freestyle
Pan American Games
Gold medal – first place	1979 San Juan	200 m freestyle
Gold medal – first place	1979 San Juan	4×100 m freestyle
Gold medal – first place	1979 San Juan	4×200 m freestyle
Gold medal – first place	1983 Caracas	100 m freestyle
Gold medal – first place	1983 Caracas	4×100 m freestyle
Gold medal – first place	1983 Caracas	4×200 m freestyle
Gold medal – first place	1983 Caracas	4×100 m medley
Bronze medal – third place	1983 Caracas	200 m freestyle

Ambrose "Rowdy" Gaines IV (born February 17, 1959) is an American former competitive swimmer, U.S. Olympic Hall of Fame member, three-time Olympic gold medalist, and member of the International Swimming Hall of Fame. He is referred to as "The Voice of Swimming", having covered swimming at the Olympic Games since 1992 in Barcelona and is currently a swimming analyst for television network NBC.

== Early life ==
Gaines was born in Winter Haven, Florida to Jettie Ann and Ambrose "Buddy" Gaines, who met there as water skiers at Cypress Gardens in the 1950s. Gaines tried several sports during his teenage years, but turned to swimming as a Winter Haven High School junior at age 17. He received a swimming scholarship to Auburn University. At Auburn, he became a five-time NCAA champion under the training of head coach Richard Quick.

== Career ==
From 1978 to 1984, Gaines set 10 world records. At the time, he was the world record holder in the 100-meter and 200-meter freestyles. The 1980 boycott prevented Gaines from competing at the 1980 Moscow Olympics. Gaines said the boycott came at a time when he considered himself at his peak, and that he believed he missed an opportunity for four gold medals.

Gaines qualified for the 1984 Summer Olympics in Los Angeles, California. He won gold in the 100-meter freestyle and two gold medals for relays, swimming the anchor legs for the U.S. team in the 4×100-meter freestyle relay and 4×100-meter medley relay.

Gaines said he experienced mental health issues after missing out on the 1980 Games and had "some real trouble post-Olympics, and...some big struggles, especially the year after."

== Commentating ==
He began covering swimming for NBC at the Atlanta 1996 Summer Olympics. He also was the analyst at the Sydney 2000 Summer Olympics, the Athens 2004 Summer Olympics, the Beijing 2008 Summer Olympics, the London 2012 Summer Olympics, the Rio 2016 Summer Olympics, the Tokyo 2020 Summer Olympics held in 2021, and the Paris 2024 Summer Olympics. Gaines announced on Instagram that the Los Angeles 2028 Summer Olympics will be his last, announcing his retirement to be a full time grandfather.

At the 2011 Short Course Masters Nationals, Gaines broke his national record in the 50–54 division 50 yard freestyle (21.36). On July 16, 2011, Gaines broke the 50–54 Age Group record in the long course 100m freestyle with a time of 54.6.

Gaines is the executive director of Rowdy’s Kidz, a wellness initiative developed and supported by The Limu Company that reaches out to children across the country.

Gaines and his wife, Judy, reside in Lake Mary, Florida, with their four daughters.

== Awards ==
- International Swimming Hall of Fame
- U.S. Olympic Hall of Fame
- Alabama Sports Hall of Fame
- Florida Sports Hall of Fame
- Southeastern Conference Athlete of the Year 1981
- 1982 McDonald's Spirit Award
- 2007 NCAA Silver Anniversary Award
- Golden Goggle Awards, Alumni of the Year: 2024

== See also ==
- List of members of the International Swimming Hall of Fame
- List of Auburn University people
- List of multiple Olympic gold medalists
- List of multiple Olympic gold medalists at a single Games
- List of Olympic medalists in swimming (men)
- List of World Aquatics Championships medalists in swimming (men)
- World record progression 50 metres freestyle
- World record progression 100 metres freestyle
- World record progression 200 metres freestyle
- World record progression 4 × 100 metres freestyle relay
- World record progression 4 × 100 metres medley relay
- World record progression 4 × 200 metres freestyle relay

== Bibliography ==
- Caraccioli, Jerry, & Tom Caraccioli, Boycott: Stolen Dreams of the 1980 Moscow Olympic Games, New Chapter Press, Washington, D.C. (2009). ISBN 978-0-942257-54-0.
- De George, Matthew, Pooling Talent: Swimming's Greatest Teams, Rowman & Littlefield, Lanham, Maryland (2014). ISBN 978-1-4422-3701-8.

Records
Preceded by Chris Cavanaugh	Men's 50-meter freestyle world record-holder (long course); April 10, 1980 – April 10, 1980	Succeeded by Bruce Stahl
Preceded by Jonty Skinner	Men's 100-meter freestyle world record-holder (long course); April 3, 1981 – August 6, 1985	Succeeded by Matt Biondi
Preceded by Sergey Kopliakov	Men's 200-meter freestyle world record-holder (long course); April 11, 1980 – June 21, 1983	Succeeded by Michael Gross
Awards
Preceded by None	Swimming World; World Swimmer of the Year; 1980	Succeeded by Alex Baumann
