= 1981 Summer Universiade =

Multi-sport event in Bucharest, Romania

XI Summer Universiade XI Universiada de vară
- Host city: Bucharest, Romania
- Nations: 86
- Athletes: 2,912
- Events: 124 in 10 sports
- Opening: July 19, 1981
- Closing: July 30, 1981
- Opened by: Nicolae Ceauşescu; President of the Socialist Republic of Romania
- Torch lighter: Nadia Comăneci
- Main venue: Lia Manoliu Stadium

The 1981 Summer Universiade, also known as the XI Summer Universiade, took place in Bucharest, Romania. The events were watched by 200,000 spectators.

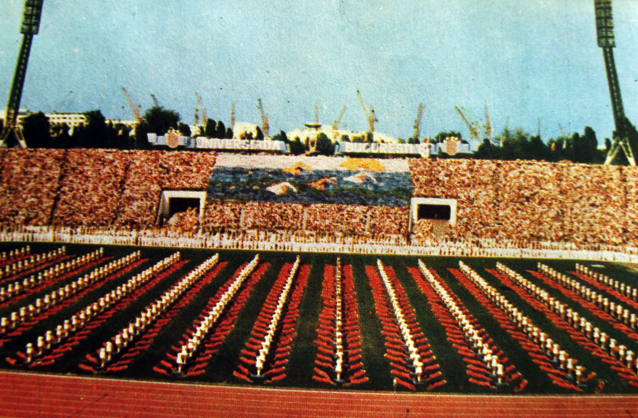
Main stadium

== Sports ==
- Athletics ()
- Basketball ()
- Diving ()
- Fencing ()
- Gymnastics ()
- Swimming ()
- Tennis ()
- Volleyball ()
- Water polo ()
- Wrestling ()

== Medal table ==
* Host nation (Romania)

Rank	Nation	Gold	Silver	Bronze	Total
1	Soviet Union (URS)	38	38	36	112
2	Romania (ROU)*	31	17	19	67
3	United States (USA)	29	19	9	57
4	China (CHN)	10	6	5	21
5	Italy (ITA)	6	4	3	13
6	East Germany (GDR)	4	6	1	11
7	Japan (JPN)	3	2	2	7
8	Cuba (CUB)	2	2	4	8
9	West Germany (FRG)	2	1	3	6
10	Great Britain (GBR)	2	1	2	5
11	Yugoslavia (YUG)	1	3	2	6
12	Hungary (HUN)	1	2	2	5
13	Czechoslovakia (TCH)	1	2	1	4
14	Poland (POL)	1	0	4	5
15	Morocco (MAR)	1	0	0	1
15	Sweden (SWE)	1	0	0	1
17	Bulgaria (BUL)	0	4	5	9
18	Brazil (BRA)	0	3	10	13
19	Canada (CAN)	0	3	2	5
20	South Korea (KOR)	0	1	4	5
21	France (FRA)	0	1	3	4
22	Australia (AUS)	0	1	0	1
22	Finland (FIN)	0	1	0	1
22	Greece (GRE)	0	1	0	1
22	Switzerland (SUI)	0	1	0	1
26	Algeria (ALG)	0	0	1	1
26	Austria (AUT)	0	0	1	1
26	Ghana (GHA)	0	0	1	1
26	Ivory Coast (CIV)	0	0	1	1
26	Mongolia (MGL)	0	0	1	1
Totals (30 entries)		133	119	122	374
