= List of Universiade medalists in swimming (men) =

This is the complete list of men's Universiade medalists in swimming from 1959 to 2019.

== Events ==
=== 50 m freestyle ===
Games	Gold		Silver		Bronze	
1987	Tom Williams (USA)	22.90	Hans Kroes (NED)	23.11	Stephan Güsgen (FRG)	23.35
1991	Stéphan Caron (FRA)	22.97	Robert Pufleb (GER)	23.15	Krzysztof Cwalina (POL); Eric Hansen (USA)	23.20
1993	David Fox (USA)		Brian Kurza (USA)		Dean Kondziolka (CAN)	
1995	Fernando Scherer (BRA)		Bill Pilczuk (USA)		Jason Rosenbaum (USA)	
1997	Nathan Rickard (AUS)	22.50	Lorenzo Vismara (ITA)	23.04	Brendon Dedekind (RSA)	23.07
1999	Aaron Ciarla (USA)		Dean Hutchinson (USA)		Ricardo Dornelas (BRA)	
2001	Bartosz Kizierowski (POL)		Vyacheslav Shyrshov (UKR)		Tomohiro Yamanoi (JPN)	
2003	Vyacheslav Shyrshov (UKR)	22.59	Peter Mankoč (SLO)	22.77	Andrey Kapralov (RUS)	22.81
2005	Cullen Jones (USA)	22.22	Andrey Kapralov (RUS)	22.40	Nicholas Santos (BRA)	22.44
2007	Nicholas Santos (BRA)	22.12	Jonathon Newton (AUS)	22.33	Donald Goodrich (USA)	22.39
2009	Andrea Rolla (ITA)	22.16	Boris Steimetz (FRA); Sergey Fesikov (RUS)	22.19	None awarded	
2011	Lucio Spadaro (ITA)	22.30	Adam Small (USA)	22.31	Shinri Shioura (JPN)	22.37
2013	Vladimir Morozov (RUS)	21.67	Andrey Grechin (RUS)	22.10	Andriy Govorov (UKR)	22.17
2015	Yauhen Tsurkin (BLR)	22.22	Henrique Martins (BRA)	22.24	Paul Powers (USA)	22.34
2017	Ari-Pekka Liukkonen (FIN)	22.02	Ítalo Duarte (BRA) Katsumi Nakamura (JPN)	22.05	None awarded	
2019	David Cumberlidge (GBR)	21.97	Kosuke Matsui (JPN)	22.26	Daniil Markov (RUS)	22.39
2021	Giovanni Izzo (ITA)	22.17	Lucas Peixoto (ITA)	22.38	Jokūbas Keblys (LTU)	22.39

=== 100 m freestyle ===
Games	Gold		Silver		Bronze	
1959	Igor Luzhkovsky (URS)	57.0	Andrzej Salamon (POL)	57.7	Paolo Pucci (ITA)	58.0
1961	Keigo Shimizu (JPN)	57.4	Andrzej Salamon (POL)	57.6	Kiyoshi Fukui (JPN)	57.9
1963	Hans-Joachim Klein (FRG)	54.4	Makoto Fukui (JPN)	56.4	Gyula Dobay (HUN)	56.8
1965	Hans-Joachim Klein (FRG)	54.4	Don Roth (USA)	54.8	Gary Ilman (USA)	55.0
1967	Don Havens (USA)	53.2	Bob McGregor (GBR)	53.4	Zac Zorn (USA)	53.8
1970	Frank Heckl (USA)	53.2	Dan Frawley (USA)	53.4	Leonid Ilyichov (URS)	53.9
1973	Vladimir Bure (URS)	52.03	Kenneth Knox (USA)	52.90	Dean Anderson (USA)	53.31
1977	John Ebuna (USA)	52.05	Andy Coan (USA)	52.12	Klaus Steinbach (FRG)	52.27
1979	Marcello Guarducci (ITA)	51.88	Kirk Peppas (USA)	51.91	Bruce Stahl (USA)	52.32
1981	Kris Kirchner (USA)	51.39	Serhiy Krasyuk (URS)	51.86	Jorge Fernandes (BRA)	52.06
1983	Sergey Smiryagin (URS)	50.51	Tom Jager (USA)	51.02	Andreas Schmidt (FRG)	51.60
1985	Matt Biondi (USA)	49.14	Stéphan Caron (FRA)	49.97	Scott McCadam (USA)	50.63
1987	Andy Jameson (GBR)	51.42	Patrick Dybiona (NED)	51.70	Hans Kroes (NED)	51.83
1991	Stéphan Caron (FRA)	49.72	Axel Hickmann (GER)	50.81	Robert Pufleb (GER)	51.19
1993	David Fox (USA)		Seth Pepper (USA)		Pavlo Khnykin (UKR)	
1995	Fernando Scherer (BRA)		Gustavo Borges (BRA)		Josh Davis (USA)	
1997	Marcos Hernández (CUB)	50.50	Lorenzo Vismara (ITA)	50.70	Christian Tröger (GER)	50.78
1999	Denis Pimankov (RUS)		Mauro Gallo (ITA)		Nicholas Folker (RSA)	
2001	Romain Barnier (FRA)		Bartosz Kizierowski (POL)		Vyacheslav Shyrshov (UKR)	
2003	Andrey Kapralov (RUS)	49.36	Chris Cozens (GBR)	49.94	Yuriy Yegoshin (UKR)	50.02
2005	Yevgeny Lagunov (RUS)	49.52	Andrey Kapralov (RUS)	49.70	Alessandro Calvi (ITA)	49.90
2007	Andrey Grechin (RUS)	49.29	Adam Ritter (USA)	49.70	Fernando Silva (BRA)	49.71
2009	Sergey Fesikov (RUS)	48.43	Cameron Prosser (AUS)	48.57	Jason Dunford (KEN)	48.73
2011	Jimmy Feigen (USA)	49.26	Norbert Trandafir (ROU)	49.41	Shinri Shioura (JPN)	49.50
2013	Vladimir Morozov (RUS)	47.62	Nikita Lobintsev (RUS)	48.54	Michele Santucci (ITA)	49.30
2015	Henrique Martins (BRA)	48.98	Jack Conger (USA)	49.02	Marco Belotti (ITA)	49.43
2017	Ryan Held (USA)	48.36	Kacper Majchrzak (POL)	48.38	Katsumi Nakamura (JPN)	48.63
2019	Zach Apple (USA)	48.01	Tate Jackson (USA)	48.29	Marco Antônio Ferreira (BRA)	48.57
2021	Kamil Sieradzki (POL)	49.08	Giovanni Carraro (ITA)	49.18	Lucas Peixoto (BRA) Mateusz Chowaniec (POL)	49.34

=== 200 m freestyle ===
Games	Gold		Silver		Bronze	
1979	Bill O'Brien (USA)	1:54.00	Sergey Rusin (URS)	1:54.55	Keith Dickson (USA)	1:54.62
1981	Andy Schmidt (USA)	1:52.62	Jorge Fernandes (BRA)	1:52.92	Djan Madruga (BRA)	1:53.00
1983	Bruce Hayes (USA)	1:51.19	Alexey Filonov (URS)	1:51.90	Alex Baumann (CAN)	1:51.97
1985	Matt Biondi (USA)	1:49.52	Stéphan Caron (FRA)	1:49.78	Marcel Gery (TCH)	1:50.98
1987	Frank Drost (NED)	1:51.62	Jeffrey Olsen (USA)	1:51.95	Joseph Parker (USA)	1:52.14
1991	Stéphan Caron (FRA)	1:50.24	Artur Wojdat (POL)	1:50.69	Turlough O'Hare (CAN)	1:51.22
1993	Yann de Fabrique (FRA)		Rob McFarlane (CAN)		Turlough O'Hare (CAN)	
1995	Yann de Fabrique (FRA)		Dan Kanner (USA)		Masayuki Fujimoto (JPN)	
1997	Béla Szabados (HUN)	1:50.70	Scott Goldblatt (USA)	1:51.96	Michael Kiedel (GER)	1:52.13
1999	Mark Warkentin (USA)		Lionel Poirot (FRA)		Dmitry Chernyshyov (RUS)	
2001	Clay Kirkland (USA)		Matteo Pelliciari (ITA)		Dan Ketchum (USA)	
2003	Yoshihiro Okumura (JPN)	1:49.82	Peter Mankoč (SLO)	1:50.10	Ross Davenport (GBR)	1:50.51
2005	Yury Prilukov (RUS)	1:49.12	Ross Davenport (GBR)	1:49.16	Markus Rogan (AUT)	1:50.47
2007	Adam Ritter (USA)	1:47.42	Andrew Hunter (GBR)	1:48.17	Brian Johns (CAN)	1:48.29
2009	Sho Uchida (JPN)	1:47.63	Scot Robison (USA)	1:48.34	Shogo Hihara (JPN)	1:48.49
2011	Matt McLean (USA)	1:47.44	Clément Lefert (FRA)	1:47.78	Sho Uchida (JPN)	1:49.06
2013	Danila Izotov (RUS)	1:45.48	Nikita Lobintsev (RUS)	1:46.30	Paweł Korzeniowski (POL)	1:46.91
2015	Reed Malone (USA)	1:47.15	Clay Youngquist (USA)	1:47.91	Jacob Hansford (AUS)	1:48.29
2017	Danas Rapšys (LTU)	1:45.75	Kacper Majchrzak (POL)	1:46.19	Mikhail Vekovishchev (RUS)	1:46.48
2019	Zach Apple (USA)	1:46.80	Nikolay Snegirev (RUS)	1:46.97	Stefano Di Cola (ITA)	1:47.86
2021	Kamil Sieradzki (POL)	1:47.60	Tomas Navikonis (LTU)	1:47.73	Giovanni Caserta (ITA)	1:48.01

=== 400 m freestyle ===
Games	Gold		Silver		Bronze	
1959	Igor Luzhkovsky (URS)	4:43.8	Ling (GDR)	4:46.5	Mario Liotti (ITA)	4:57.9
1961	Tatsuo Fujimoto (JPN)	4:30.9	Murray McLachlan (RSA)	4:32.3	Matsuki Tomashiro (JPN)	4:35.1
1963	Haruo Yoshimuta (JPN)	4:26.6	Murray McLachlan (RSA)	4:29.5	Hans-Joachim Klein (FRG)	4:31.1
1965	Semyon Belits-Geiman (URS)	4:15.6	Michael Wall (USA)	4:22.5	József Katona (HUN)	4:23.7
1967	Greg Charlton (USA)	4:08.2	Mike Burton (USA)	4:13.6	Tony Jarvis (GBR)	4:21.1
1970	Andy Strenk (USA)	4:12.1	Steve Genter (USA)	4:13.6	Vladimir Bure (URS)	4:17.9
1973	Jack Tingley (USA)	4:02.87	Aleksandr Samsonov (URS)	4:12.09	José Namorado (BRA)	4:12.74
1977	Dick Hannula Jr. (USA)	4:02.17	Vladimir Mikheyev (URS)	4:03.78	Igor Kushpelev (URS)	4:03.93
1979	Sergey Rusin (URS)	4:02.26	John Hillencamp (USA)	4:05.23	Graeme Brewer (AUS)	4:05.32
1981	Daniel Machek (TCH)	3:58.08	Djan Madruga (BRA)	3:58.54	Sergey Kalashnikov (URS)	4:00.95
1983	Vladimir Salnikov (URS)	3:49.38	Bruce Hayes (USA)	3:54.93	Svyatoslav Semenov (URS)	3:56.57
1985	Justin Lemberg (AUS)	3:52.45	John Mykkanen (USA)	3:53.24	Thomas Fahrner (FRG)	3:54.17
1987	Andrey Patrakov (URS)	3:56.13	Darjan Petrič (YUG)	3:56.57	Kevin Boyd (GBR)	3:56.62
1991	Artur Wojdat (POL)	3:52.55	Peter Wright (USA)	3:54.47	Vladimir Belov (URS)	3:55.11
1993	Turlough O'Hare (CAN)		Yann de Fabrique (FRA)		Valter Kalaus (HUN)	
1995	Josh Davis (USA)		Dan Kanner (USA)		Yann de Fabrique (FRA)	
1997	Luiz Lima (BRA)	3:53.91	Béla Szabados (HUN)	3:54.30	Hisato Yasui (JPN)	3:55.05
1999	Mark Warkentin (USA)		Andrea Righi (ITA)		Denys Zavhorodnyy (UKR)	
2001	Ihor Snitko (UKR)		Dragoș Coman (ROU)		Shunichi Fujita (JPN)	
2003	Yury Prilukov (RUS)	3:52.27	Justin Mortimer (USA)	3:52.73	Dragoș Coman (ROU)	3:53.26
2005	Yury Prilukov (RUS)	3:49.85	Justin Mortimer (USA)	3:50.52	Takeshi Matsuda (JPN)	3:51.91
2007	Dragoș Coman (ROU)	3:48.29	Michael Klueh (USA)	3:49.10	Yury Prilukov (RUS)	3:49.19
2009	Przemysław Stańczyk (POL)	3:46.72	Chad La Tourette (USA)	3:46.93	Federico Colbertaldo (ITA)	3:47.17
2011	David McKeon (AUS)	3:48.78	Michael Klueh (USA)	3:48.84	Sho Uchida (JPN)	3:51.93
2013	Ryan Napoleon (AUS)	3:48.96	Kohei Yamamoto (JPN)	3:49.03	Fumiya Hidaka (JPN)	3:50.63
2015	Jay Lelliott (GBR)	3:48.84	Jack McLoughlin (AUS)	3:48.88	Reed Malone (USA)	3:50.13
2017	Mykhailo Romanchuk (UKR)	3:45.96	Jay Lelliott (GBR)	3:48.88	Grant Shoults (USA)	3:49.03
2019	Keisuke Yoshida (JPN)	3:49.48	Matteo Ciampi (ITA)	3:50.04	Anton Nikitin (RUS)	3:50.41
2021	Matteo Lamberti (ITA)	3:48.65	Eduardo de Moraes (BRA)	3:49.10	Ikki Imoto (JPN)	3:49.66

=== 800 m freestyle ===
Games	Gold		Silver		Bronze	
1993	Turlough O'Hare (CAN)		Lars Jorgensen (USA)		Masayuki Fujimoto (JPN)	
1995	Christian Pieper (GER)		Luiz Lima (BRA)		Hisato Yasui (JPN)	
1997	Ihor Snitko (UKR)	8:05.13	Luiz Lima (BRA)	8:06.26	Marco Formentini (ITA)	8:06.37
1999	Mark Warkentin (USA)		Andrea Righi (ITA)		Denys Zavhorodnyy (UKR)	
2001	Ihor Snitko (UKR)		Shunichi Fujita (JPN)		Brendan Neligan (USA)	
2003	Yury Prilukov (RUS)	7:54.18	Ihor Chervynskyy (UKR)	7:57.21	Peter Vanderkaay (USA)	7:59.22
2005	Przemysław Stańczyk (POL)	7:57.00	Yury Prilukov (RUS)	7:57.05	Takeshi Matsuda (JPN)	7:58.82
2007	Chad La Tourette (USA)	7:49.90	Yury Prilukov (RUS)	7:50.49	Serhiy Fesenko (UKR)	7:52.41
2009	Chad La Tourette (USA)	7:47.24	Federico Colbertaldo (ITA)	7:48.58	Przemysław Stańczyk (POL)	7:53.67
2011	Michael Klueh (USA)	7:52.31	Rocco Potenza (ITA)	7:53.45	Yohsuke Miyamoto (JPN)	7:56.29
2013	Kohei Yamamoto (JPN)	7:49.96	Serhiy Frolov (UKR)	7:51.02	Eric Hedlin (CAN)	7:53.78
2015	Serhiy Frolov (UKR)	7:50.28	Jay Lelliott (GBR)	7:50.97	Ayatsugu Hirai (JPN)	7:52.77
2017	Gregorio Paltrinieri (ITA)	7:45.76	Mykhailo Romanchuk (UKR)	7:46.28	Serhiy Frolov (UKR)	7:51.06
2019	Anton Nikitin (RUS)	7:56.65	Nicholas Norman (USA)	7:57.95	Filip Zaborowski (POL)	7:58.27
2021	Matteo Lamberti (ITA)	7:54.12	Kaito Tabuchi (JPN)	7:57.37	Ivan Giovannoni (ITA)	8:00.00

=== 1500 m freestyle ===
Games	Gold		Silver		Bronze	
1959	Kadar (HUN)	19:55.7	Strasser (FRG)	20:07.0	José Cossio (ESP)	20:10.3
1961	Murray McLachlan (RSA)	18:19.8	Matsuki Tomashiro (JPN)	18:21.6	Tatsuo Fujimoto (JPN)	18:23.1
1963	Haruo Yoshimuta (JPN)	18:04.8	Pyotr Pikalov (URS)	18:04.9	Murray McLachlan (RSA)	18:20.6
1965	Michael Wall (USA)	17:09.9	Semyon Belits-Geiman (URS)	17:17.8	Mike Burton (USA)	17:25.1
1967	Mike Burton (USA)	16:34.6	Andy Strenk (USA)	16:43.4	Katsuji Ito (JPN)	17:32.9
1970	Andy Strenk (USA)	16:43.1	Steve Genter (USA)	17:01.1	Władysław Wojtakajtis (POL)	17:34.9
1973	Jack Tingley (USA)	16:02.20	Anton Van Klooster (NED)	16:30.03	Jim McConica (USA)	16:37.79
1977	John Weston (USA)	15:46.94	Igor Kushpelev (URS)	15:59.80	Kyle Ditzler (USA)	16:10.87
1979	Ron Neugent (USA)	16:01.87	Igor Kushpelev (URS)	16:09.22	Bill O'Brien (USA)	16:13.88
1981	Aleksandr Chayev (URS)	15:22.25	Sergey Kalashnikov (URS)	15:40.62	Monte Brown (USA)	15:48.70
1983	Vladimir Salnikov (URS)	15:02.83	Svyatoslav Semenov (URS)	15:28.36	Bruce Hayes (USA)	15:37.97
1985	Alex Miawsky (USA)	15:20.13	Mike O'Brien (USA)	15:20.45	Tony Day (GBR)	15:31.93
1987	Alex Miawsky (USA)	15:23.22	Darjan Petrič (YUG)	15:26.60	Rod Kirschenman (USA)	15:26.62
1991	Ian Wilson (GBR)	15:15.30	Jeffrey Ong (MAS)	15:23.61	Christopher Bowie (CAN)	15:31.87
1993	Rob Darzynkiewicz (USA)		Marco Formentini (ITA)		Masayuki Fujimoto (JPN)	
1995	Hisato Yasui (JPN)		Luiz Lima (BRA)		Yann de Fabrique (FRA)	
1997	Luiz Lima (BRA)	15:20.83	Marco Formentini (ITA)	15:21.00	Nathaniel Lewis (USA)	15:21.15
1999	Andrea Righi (ITA)		Mark Leonard (USA)		Daniel Vidal (ESP)	
2001	Ihor Snitko (UKR)		Luca Baldini (ITA)		John Cole (USA)	
2003	Yury Prilukov (RUS)	15:12.13	Ihor Chervynskyy (UKR)	15:14.46	Peter Vanderkaay (USA)	15:19.44
2005	Justin Mortimer (USA)	15:23.74	Thomas Lurz (GER)	15:26.20	Ihor Chervynskyy (UKR)	15:26.70
2007	Chad La Tourette (USA)	15:00.26	Serhiy Fesenko (UKR)	15:10.81	Michael Klueh (USA)	15:13.04
2009	Przemysław Stańczyk (POL)	14:51.06	Chad La Tourette (USA)	14:53.77	Federico Colbertaldo (ITA)	15:03.90
2011	Rocco Potenza (ITA)	15:00.57	Yohsuke Miyamoto (JPN)	15:04.86	Serhiy Frolov (UKR)	15:06.17
2013	Sean Ryan (USA)	14:57.33	Kohei Yamamoto (JPN)	15:00.15	Serhiy Frolov (UKR)	15:02.63
2015	Ayatsugu Hirai (JPN)	14:56.10	Serhiy Frolov (UKR)	15:02.81	Kohei Yamamoto (JPN)	15:03.99
2017	Gregorio Paltrinieri (ITA)	14:47.75	Mykhailo Romanchuk (UKR)	14:57.51	Gergely Gyurta (HUN)	15:01.11
2019	Victor Johansson (SWE)	15:01.76	Alessio Occhipinti (ITA)	15:07.36	Nicholas Norman (USA)	15:09.29
2021	Ivan Giovannoni (ITA)	15:11.81	Kaito Tabuchi (JPN)	15:14.60	Christopher Nagy (USA)	15:19.23

=== 50 m backstroke ===
Games	Gold		Silver		Bronze	
2001	Peter Marshall (USA); Mariusz Siembida (POL)		None awarded		Todd Smolinski (USA)	
2003	James Westcott (USA)	25.80	Ouyang Kunpeng (CHN)	25.82	Vyacheslav Shyrshov (UKR)	25.88
2005	Liam Tancock (GBR)	25.50	Sung Min (KOR)	25.59	Masafumi Yamaguchi (JPN); Matt Grevers (USA)	25.61
2007	Helge Meeuw (GER)	25.42	Junya Koga (JPN)	25.43	Matthew Clay (GBR)	25.44
2009	Junya Koga (JPN)	24.63	Ryosuke Irie (JPN)	25.05	Guy Barnea (ISR)	25.09
2011	Ryosuke Irie (JPN)	25.11	Guy Barnea (ISR)	25.21	Sergey Makov (RUS)	25.42
2013	Ben Treffers (AUS)	24.86	Vladimir Morozov (RUS)	24.87	Stefano Pizzamiglio (ITA)	24.92
2015	Junya Hasegawa (JPN)	25.25	Stefano Pizzamiglio (ITA)	25.43	Nikita Ulyanov (RUS)	25.49
2017	Shane Ryan (IRL)	24.72	Justin Ress (USA)	24.73	Won Young-jun (KOR)	25.06
2019	Justin Ress (USA) Zane Waddell (RSA)	24.48	None awarded		Grigoriy Tarasevich (RUS)	24.94
2021	Simone Stefanì (ITA)	24.98	Andrei Anghel (ROU)	25.06	Michele Lamberti (ITA)	25.09

=== 100 m backstroke ===
Games	Gold		Silver		Bronze	
1959	Gilberto Elsa (ITA)	1:05.7	Georgiy Kuvaldin (URS)	1:06.5	Mihovil Dorčić (YUG)	1:06.6
1961	Shigeo Fukushima (JPN)	1:05.3	Vsevolod Tarasov (URS)	1:05.8	Vlastimil Kreek (TCH)	1:05.9
1967	Charlie Hickcox (USA)	59.3	Doug Russell (USA)	1:00.0	Roderick Jones (GBR)	1:02.6
1970	Mitch Ivey (USA)	59.4	Charlie Campbell (USA)	59.5	Mike Richards (GBR)	1:01.7
1973	David Johnson (USA)	59.94	Igor Potyakin (URS)	1:00.59	Erik Fish (CAN)	1:00.67
1977	Rômulo Arantes (BRA)	58.45	Jim Ballard (USA)	58.75	Zoltán Verrasztó (HUN)	58.79
1979	Mark Kerry (AUS)	57.05	Rômulo Arantes (BRA)	58.10	Mike Bottom (USA)	58.55
1981	Sergei Zabolotnov (URS)	58.09	Vladimir Dolgov (URS)	58.19	Rômulo Arantes (BRA)	58.24
1983	Mike West (CAN)	56.64	Vladimir Shemetov (URS)	56.71	Viktor Kuznetsov (URS)	56.74
1985	Igor Polyansky (URS)	56.26	Mark Rhodenbaugh (USA)	56.99	Sergei Zabolotnov (URS)	57.04
1987	Daichi Suzuki (JPN)	56.57	David Berkoff (USA)	57.22	Jay Mortenson (USA)	57.44
1991	Deke Botsford (CAN)	56.40	Tripp Schwenk (USA)	56.70	Scott Johnson (USA)	56.78
1993	Rodolfo Falcón (CUB)		Tripp Schwenk (USA)		Emanuele Merisi (ITA)	
1995	Kurt Jachimowski (USA)		Hajime Itoi (JPN)		Bobby Brewer (USA)	
1997	Neisser Bent (CUB)	55.82	Robert Brewer (USA)	56.22	Mariusz Siembida (POL)	56.50
1999	Simon Thirsk (RSA)		Keitaro Konnai (JPN)		Atsushi Nishikori (JPN)	
2001	Peter Marshall (USA)		Todd Smolinski (USA)		Volodymyr Nikolaychuk (UKR)	
2003	Ouyang Kunpeng (CHN)	54.99	James Westcott (USA)	55.35	Volodymyr Nikolaychuk (UKR)	55.70
2005	Masafumi Yamaguchi (JPN)	55.00	Matt Grevers (USA)	55.08	Junichi Miyashita (JPN)	55.81
2007	Helge Meeuw (GER)	54.21	Markus Rogan (AUT)	54.27	Nick Thoman (USA)	54.62
2009	Ryosuke Irie (JPN)	52.60	Helge Meeuw (GER)	52.94	Junya Koga (JPN)	53.50
2011	Gareth Kean (NZL)	54.71	Juan Miguel Rando Galvez (ESP)	54.94	Kurt Bassett (NZL); Sebastiano Ranfagni (ITA)	55.21
2013	Yuki Shirai (JPN)	53.70	Ben Treffers (AUS)	53.76	Jacob Pebley (USA)	54.11
2015	Junya Hasegawa (JPN)	53.77	Christopher Ciccarese (ITA)	53.92	Jack Conger (USA)	54.09
2017	Justin Ress (USA)	53.29	Kosuke Hagino (JPN)	54.12	Danas Rapšys (LTU)	54.17
2019	Grigoriy Tarasevich (RUS)	53.51	Yohann Ndoye-Brouard (FRA)	53.80	Justin Ress (USA)	53.81
2021	Simone Stefanì (ITA)	53.95	Michele Lamberti (ITA)	54.02	Denis Popescu (ROU)	54.21

=== 200 m backstroke ===
Games	Gold		Silver		Bronze	
1963	József Csikány (POL)	2:19.9	Jan Weeteling (NED)	2:22.3	Julio Cabrera (ESP)	2:23.9
1965	Gary Dilley (USA); Viktor Mazanov (URS)	2:13.7	None awarded		Thompson Mann (USA)	2:13.9
1967	Charlie Hickcox (USA)	2:09.4	Mark Mader (USA)	2:13.5	Shigeo Fukushima (JPN)	2:15.9
1970	Mitch Ivey (USA)	2:09.3	Charlie Campbell (USA)	2:09.6	Mike Richards (GBR)	2:15.0
1973	David Johnson (USA)	2:10.53	Steve Furniss (USA)	2:12.72	John Hawes (CAN)	2:13.93
1977	Zoltán Verrasztó (HUN)	2:05.60	Bruce Hardcastle (USA)	2:06.52	Jim Ballard (USA)	2:07.67
1979	Kyle Miller (USA)	2:07.30	Djan Madruga (BRA)	2:07.70	Ron Raikula (USA)	2:07.81
1981	Sergei Zabolotnov (URS)	2:03.65	Djan Madruga (BRA)	2:03.73	Zbigniew Januszkiewicz (POL)	2:05.37
1983	Sergei Zabolotnov (URS)	2:00.42	Vladimir Shemetov (URS)	2:01.27	Mike West (CAN)	2:01.63
1985	Igor Polyansky (URS)	1:59.76	Sean Murphy (CAN)	2:02.69	Mike West (CAN)	2:03.14
1987	Daichi Suzuki (JPN)	2:02.98	Zoltan Balajti (HUN)	2:03.95	Michael Lambert (USA)	2:04.14
1991	Tripp Schwenk (USA)	2:00.38	Kevin Draxinger (CAN)	2:00.92	Dmitriy Haritonov (URS)	2:01.73
1993	Rodolfo Falcón (CUB)		Emanuele Merisi (ITA)		Tripp Schwenk (USA)	
1995	Ji Sang-jun (KOR)		Ryuji Horii (JPN)		Jason Lancaster (USA)	
1997	Emanuele Merisi (ITA)	2:00.29	Neisser Bent (CUB)	2:00.37	Ji Sang-jun (KOR)	2:02.52
1999	Beau Wiebel (USA)		Tate Blahnik (USA)		Greg Hamm (CAN)	
2001	Bryce Hunt (USA)		Simon Dufour (FRA)		Yu Rui (CHN)	
2003	Ouyang Kunpeng (CHN)	1:59.17	Takashi Nakano (JPN)	2:01.60	Chris DeJong (USA)	2:01.63
2005	Blaž Medvešek (SLO)	1:58.91	Takashi Nakano (JPN)	1:59.09	Masafumi Yamaguchi (JPN)	2:00.76
2007	Markus Rogan (AUT)	1:56.66	Takashi Nakano (JPN)	1:58.14	Nick Thoman (USA)	1:58.61
2009	Ryosuke Irie (JPN)	1:54.13	Patrick Schirk (USA)	1:57.05	Kazuki Watanabe (JPN)	1:58.23
2011	Ryosuke Irie (JPN)	1:56.01	Rex Tullius (USA)	1:58.66	Gareth Kean (NZL)	1:58.74
2013	Jack Conger (USA)	1:55.47	Yuki Shirai (JPN)	1:56.95	Jacob Pebley (USA)	1:57.43
2015	Jacob Pebley (USA)	1:56.29	Keita Sunama (JPN)	1:57.50	Andrey Shabasov (RUS)	1:57.68
2017	Danas Rapšys (LTU)	1:56.52	Austin Katz (USA)	1:56.70	Roman Larin (RUS)	1:57.29
2019	Austin Katz (USA)	1:55.65	Grigoriy Tarasevich (RUS)	1:57.91	Clark Beach (USA)	1:57.96
2021	Jackson Jones (USA)	1:57.66	Kodai Nishiono (JPN)	1:58.08	Kim Seong-ju (KOR)	1:59.99

=== 50 m breaststroke ===
Games	Gold		Silver		Bronze	
2001	Oleh Lisohor (UKR)		Remo Lütolf (SUI)		Adam Whitehead (GBR)	
2003	James Gibson (GBR)	27.92	Oleh Lisohor (UKR)	27.94	Mihály Flaskay (HUN)	28.05
2005	Oleh Lisohor (UKR)	27.63	Valeriy Dymo (UKR)	28.27	Scott Dickens (CAN)	28.27
2007	Ihor Borysyk (UKR)	27.74	Felipe Lima (BRA)	27.94	Darren Mew (GBR)	27.95
2009	Kevin Swander (USA)	27.14	Felipe França Silva (BRA)	27.23	Čaba Silađi (SRB)	27.27
2011	Glenn Snyders (NZL)	27.37	João Gomes Jr. (BRA)	27.60	Mattia Pesce (ITA)	27.80
2013	Giulio Zorzi (RSA)	27.44	Andrea Toniato (ITA)	27.53	Vladimir Morozov (RUS)	27.70
2015	Čaba Silađi (SRB)	27.34	Andrea Toniato (ITA)	27.41	Dmitriy Balandin (KAZ)	27.47
2017	Ilya Shymanovich (BLR)	27.39	Johannes Skagius (SWE)	27.49	Fabian Schwingenschlögl (GER)	27.63
2019	Kirill Prigoda (RUS)	26.99	Michael Houlie (RSA)	27.19	Ian Finnerty (USA)	27.25
2021	Qin Haiyang (CHN)	26.53	Ludovico Viberti (ITA)	27.32	Alessandro Pinzuti (ITA)	27.53

=== 100 m breaststroke ===
Games	Gold		Silver		Bronze	
1967	Ken Merten (USA)	1:08.1	Kenji Ishikawa (JPN)	1:08.7	Osamu Tsurumine (JPN)	1:09.4
1970	Nikolai Pankin (URS)	1:07.1	Nobutaka Taguchi (JPN)	1:07.5	Mike Dirksen (USA)	1:08.6
1973	Nikolai Pankin (URS)	1:06.67	Igor Cherdakov (URS)	1:07.19	Mark Chatfield (USA)	1:07.74
1977	Graham Smith (CAN)	1:05.17	Duncan Goodhew (GBR)	1:06.04	Giorgio Lalle (ITA)	1:06.34
1979	Vladimir Fliont (URS)	1:05.45	John Lundberg (USA)	1:06.15	Vladimir Tarassov (URS)	1:06.44
1981	Nicholas Nevid (USA)	1:04.33	Peter Lang (FRG)	1:05.06	Arsens Miskarovs (URS)	1:05.41
1983	Shigehiro Takahashi (JPN)	1:04.13	Yuri Kis (URS)	1:04.21	Peter Evans (AUS)	1:04.32
1985	John Moffet (USA)	1:02.88	Gianni Minervini (ITA)	1:03.38	Eduard Klimentiev (URS)	1:03.94
1987	Lorenzo Carbonari (ITA)	1:04.20	Andrew Deichert (USA)	1:04.96	Naritochi Matsuda (JPN)	1:05.00
1991	Brian Pajer (USA)	1:03.21	Chen Jianhong (CHN)	1:03.59	Leif Heg (USA)	1:04.20
1993	Jud Crawford (USA)		Akira Hayashi (JPN)		Mario González (CUB)	
1995	Akira Hayashi (JPN)		Alexander Tkachev (RUS)		Stanislav Lopukhov (RUS)	
1997	Stanislav Lopukhov (RUS)	1:02.74	Alexander Tkachev (RUS)	1:02.77	Chikara Nakashita (JPN)	1:03.05
1999	Andrey Perminov (RUS)		Akira Hayashi (JPN)		Sébastien Muff (FRA)	
2001	Oleh Lisohor (UKR)		Ryosuke Imai (JPN)		Richárd Bodor (HUN)	
2003	James Gibson (GBR)	1:00.71	Chris Cook (GBR)	1:01.28	Oleh Lisohor (UKR)	1:01.69
2005	Oleh Lisohor (UKR)	1:00.73	Kevin Swander (USA)	1:01.74	Makoto Yamashita (JPN)	1:01.69
2007	Valeriy Dymo (UKR)	1:01.27	Grigory Falko (RUS)	1:01.33	Scott Dickens (CAN)	1:01.42
2009	Ihor Borysyk (UKR)	59.53	Fabio Scozzoli (ITA)	59.85	Hiromasa Sakimoto (JPN)	59.90
2011	Giedrius Titenis (LTU)	1:00.39	Glenn Snyders (NZL)	1:00.71	João Gomes Jr. (BRA)	1:00.78
2013	Yasuhiro Koseki (JPN)	1:00.00	Mihail Alexandrov (USA)	1:00.30	Edoardo Giorgetti (ITA)	1:00.36
2015	Dmitriy Balandin (KAZ)	59.96	James Wilby (GBR)	1:00.28	Craig Benson (GBR)	1:00.33
2017	Ilya Shymanovich (BLR) Andrew Wilson (USA)	1:00.15	None awarded		Dmitriy Balandin (KAZ)	1:00.17
2019	Ian Finnerty (USA)	59.49	Kirill Prigoda (RUS)	59.50	Yuya Hinomoto (JPN)	59.72
2021	Qin Haiyang (CHN)	58.92	Jan Kałusowski (POL)	59.86	Andrius Šidlauskas (LTU)	59.89

=== 200 m breaststroke ===
Games	Gold		Silver		Bronze	
1959	Hans-Joachim Tröger (FRG)	2:42.9	Roberto Lazzari (ITA)	2:42.9	Andrzej Kłopotowski (POL)	2:45.1
1961	Yuriy Funikov (URS)	2:41.4	Yoshiaki Shikiishi (JPN)	2:41.5	Hans-Joachim Tröger (FRG)	2:43.2
1963	Ivan Karetnikov (URS)	2:37.2	Nazario Padrón (ESP)	2:42.2	Jan Gross (FRG)	2:42.4
1965	Osamu Tsurumine (JPN)	2:33.7	Ferenc Lenkei (HUN)	2:34.7	Wayne Anderson (USA)	2:35.0
1967	Ken Merten (USA)	2:31.2	Osamu Tsurumine (JPN)	2:31.5	Kenji Ishikawa (JPN)	2:34.5
1970	Rick Colella (USA)	2:25.5	Nikolai Pankin (URS)	2:28.4	Nobutaka Taguchi (JPN)	2:29.4
1973	Nikolai Pankin (URS)	2:23.81	Igor Tcherdakov (URS)	2:24.06	Felipe Muñoz (MEX)	2:27.89
1977	Graham Smith (CAN)	2:23.43	Vladimir Dementyev (URS)	2:24.10	Aigars Kudis (URS)	2:24.73
1979	Vladimir Tarassov (URS)	2:21.13	Timur Podmarev (URS)	2:21.31	Tateki Shinya (JPN)	2:25.53
1981	Arsens Miskarovs (URS)	2:19.42	Nicholas Nevid (USA)	2:21.47	Aleksandr Fedorovsky (URS)	2:23.62
1983	Robertas Žulpa (URS)	2:15.93	Shigehiro Takahashi (JPN)	2:19.72	Gennady Utenkov (URS)	2:19.80
1985	John Moffet (USA)	2:18.83	Alexandre Yokochi (POR)	2:18.92	Dimitri Kuzmin (URS)	2:19.81
1987	Alexandre Yokochi (POR)	2:18.24	Todd Torres (USA)	2:21.40	Dimitri Porotski (URS)	2:21.76
1991	Gary O'Toole (IRL)	2:16.75	Ty Richardson (USA)	2:17.42	Preston Staats (USA)	2:18.92
1993	Mario González (CUB)		Jean-Lionel Rey (FRA)		Akira Hayashi (JPN)	
1995	Alexander Tkachev (RUS)		Steve West (USA)		Akira Hayashi (JPN)	
1997	Chikara Nakashita (JPN)	2:16.35	Scott Werner (USA)	2:27.41	Byron Shefchik (USA)	2:17.50
1999	Roman Makarov (RUS)		Yoshiaki Okita (JPN)		Andrey Perminov (RUS)	
2001	Davide Rummolo (ITA)		Michele Vancini (ITA)		Tony de Pellegrini (FRA)	
2003	Sergei Gerasimov (RUS)	2:13.78	Daisuke Kimura (JPN)	2:14.00	Michael Williamson (IRL)	2:15.52
2005	Sławomir Kuczko (POL)	2:12.35	Vladislav Polyakov (KAZ)	2:12.69	Genki Imamura (JPN)	2:12.95
2007	Grigory Falko (RUS)	2:12.89	Ryan Hurley (USA)	2:13.24	Vladislav Polyakov (KAZ)	2:13.53
2009	Ihor Borysyk (UKR)	2:08.73	Naoya Tomita (JPN)	2:11.02	Giedrius Titenis (LTU)	2:11.14
2011	Glenn Snyders (NZL) Giedrius Titenis (LTU)	2:10.85	Not awarded		Kazuki Otsuda (JPN)	2:10.96
2013	Vyacheslav Sinkevich (RUS)	2:09.78	Yukihiro Takahashi (JPN)	2:10.35	Luca Pizzini (ITA)	2:10.99
2015	Josh Prenot (USA)	2:08.90	Kazuki Kohinata (JPN)	2:09.08	Craig Benson (GBR)	2:09.10
2017	Andrew Wilson (USA)	2:08.45	Dmitriy Balandin (KAZ)	2:09.70	Rustam Gadirov (RUS)	2:09.72
2019	Kirill Prigoda (RUS)	2:08.88	Ilya Khomenko (RUS)	2:09.42	Daniel Roy (USA)	2:09.63
2021	Qin Haiyang (CHN)	2:08.09	Yu Hanaguruma (JPN)	2:10.31	Yamato Fukasawa (JPN)	2:10.39

=== 50 m butterfly ===
Games	Gold		Silver		Bronze	
2001	Kohei Kawamoto (JPN) Burl Reid (AUS)		None awarded		Igor Marchenko (RUS)	
2003	Andriy Serdinov (UKR)	23.93	Serhiy Breus (UKR)	24.04	Yevgeny Korotyshkin (RUS)	24.11
2005	Serhiy Breus (UKR)	23.63	Yevgeny Korotyshkin (RUS)	23.69	Nicholas Santos (BRA)	23.98
2007	Serhiy Breus (UKR)	23.71	Nicholas Santos (BRA)	23.74	Yevgeny Korotyshkin (RUS)	23.86
2009	Jernej Godec (SLO)	23.41	Jason Dunford (KEN)	23.45	Chris Brady (USA)	23.56
2011	Tim Phillips (USA)	23.51	Paolo Facchinelli (ITA)	23.85	Masayuki Kishida (JPN)	23.93
2013	Yauhen Tsurkin (BLR)	23.28	None awarded		Piero Codia (ITA)	23.38
2013	Andriy Govorov (UKR)	23.28	None awarded		Piero Codia (ITA)	23.38
2015	Henrique Martins (BRA)	23.22	Yauhen Tsurkin (BLR)	23.44	Piero Codia (ITA)	23.48
2017	Andriy Govorov (UKR)	22.90	Andrey Zhilkin (RUS)	23.40	Henrique Martins (BRA) Andriy Khloptsov (UKR)	23.54
2019	William Yang (AUS)	23.32	Yuuya Tanaka (JPN)	23.35	Grigori Pekarski (BLR)	23.47
2021	Luca Armbruster (GER)	23.22	Jakub Majerski (POL) Lorenzo Gargani (ITA)	23.39	None awarded	

=== 100 m butterfly ===
Games	Gold		Silver		Bronze	
1967	Doug Russell (USA)	56.3	Carl Robie (USA)	58.0	S. Kitamura (JPN)	59.7
1970	John Ferris (USA)	57.5	Jerry Heidenreich (USA)	57.7	Yasuo Takada (JPN)	59.2
1973	Allan Poucher (USA)	56.36	Byron MacDonald (CAN)	57.17	Pat O'Connor (USA)	57.77
1977	Mike Curington (USA)	55.58	Dan Thompson (CAN)	57.05	John van Buren (CAN)	57.12
1979	Mike Bottom (USA)	55.37	James Halliburton (USA)	56.15	Miloslav Rolko (TCH)	56.53
1981	William Paulus (USA) Robert Placak (USA)	55.41	Not awarded		Sergei Kiselyov (URS)	56.29
1983	Aleksey Markovsky (URS)	54.65	Tom Jager (USA)	55.45	Tom Ponting (CAN)	55.55
1985	Jon Sieben (AUS)	53.97	Matt Biondi (USA)	54.03	Michael Gross (FRG)	54.16
1987	Andy Jameson (GBR)	54.65	Anthony Mosse (NZL)	54.73	David Cademartori (USA)	54.87
1991	Shen Jianqiang (CHN)	54.25	Andrey Kozirev (URS)	54.78	Dan Kutler (USA)	54.84
1993	Martin Roberts (AUS)		Mitsuharu Takane (JPN)		Oliver Lampe (GER)	
1995	Jason Lancaster (USA)		Bill Weaver (USA)		Andrey Katachev (RUS)	
1997	Denys Sylantyev (UKR)	53.73	Shamek Pietucha (CAN)	54.33	Stephen Martyak (USA)	54.50
1999	Adam Pine (AUS)		Burl Reid (AUS)		Matthew Pierce (USA)	
2001	Kohei Kawamoto (JPN)		Andriy Serdinov (UKR)		Igor Marchenko (RUS)	
2003	Andriy Serdinov (UKR)	51.99	Yevgeny Korotyshkin (RUS)	52.94	Ryo Takayasu (JPN)	53.42
2005	Serhiy Breus (UKR)	53.37	Todd Cooper (GBR)	53.41	Serhiy Advena (UKR)	53.42
2007	Darryl Rudolf (CAN)	52.89	Takashi Tomiyama (JPN)	52.97	Serhiy Breus (UKR)	53.01
2009	Jason Dunford (KEN)	51.29	Chris Brady (USA)	51.62	Maxim Ganikhin (RUS) Michal Rubáček (CZE)	52.33
2011	Tim Phillips (USA)	52.06	Tom Shields (USA)	52.62	Paweł Korzeniowski (POL)	52.96
2013	Paweł Korzeniowski (POL)	51.75	Yauhen Tsurkin (BLR)	51.80	Evgenii Koptelov (RUS)	52.04
2015	Evgenii Koptelov (RUS)	51.50	Piero Codia (ITA)	51.69	Yauhen Tsurkin (BLR)	52.12
2017	Aleksandr Sadovnikov (RUS)	51.81	Andriy Khloptsov (UKR)	51.91	Henrique Martins (BRA)	51.96
2019	Shinnosuke Ishikawa (JPN) Egor Kuimov (RUS)	52.05	None awarded		Coleman Stewart (USA)	52.11
2021	Jakub Majerski (POL)	51.41	Adrian Jaśkiewicz (POL)	51.93	Adilbek Mussin (KAZ)	52.03

=== 200 m butterfly ===
Games	Gold		Silver		Bronze	
1959	Fritz Dennerlein (ITA)	2:21.9	Grigory Kiselyov (URS)	2:25.1	Pavel Pazdírek (TCH)	2:25.2
1961	Haruo Yoshimuta (JPN)	2:20.2	Grigory Kiselyov (URS)	2:25.5	Hermann Lotter (FRG)	2:28.8
1963	Valentin Kuzmin (URS)	2:16.0	Fritz Dennerlein (ITA)	2:16.8	Isao Nakajima (JPN)	2:18.6
1965	Carl Robie (USA)	2:09.3	Butch Riker (USA)	2:10.1	Valentin Kuzmin (URS)	2:10.4
1967	John Ferris (USA)	2:06.0	Carl Robie (USA)	2:06.9	Shinji Yamanouchi (JPN)	2:11.5
1970	John Ferris (USA)	2:07.8	Yasuo Takada (JPN)	2:09.2	Ken Weinfeld (USA)	2:10.2
1973	Allen Poucher (USA)	2:05.67	Folkert Meeuw (FRG)	2:06.53	Viktor Sharygin (URS)	2:09.00
1977	Michael Kraus (FRG)	2:02.81	Andrey Avtushenko (URS)	2:03.73	Bruce Rogers (CAN)	2:05.24
1979	Mikhail Gorelik (URS)	2:04.50	Michael Kraus (FRG)	2:06.25	Sergei Kiselyov (URS)	2:06.41
1981	Sergey Fesenko Sr. (URS)	2:01.86	Levente Mady (CAN)	2:04.75	Sergei Kiselyov (URS)	2:04.85
1983	Sergey Fesenko Sr. (URS)	2:00.38	Philip Hubble (GBR)	2:01.36	Anthony Mosse (NZL)	2:02.03
1985	Michael Gross (FRG)	1:57.88	Anthony Mosse (NZL)	1:58.94	Chris Rives (USA)	2:00.03
1987	Anthony Mosse (NZL)	2:00.20	David Cademartori (USA)	2:01.52	Ondřej Bureš (TCH)	2:02.27
1991	Ray Carey (USA)	1:58.36	Brian Gunn (USA)	1:59.48	Kunio Sugimoto (JPN)	2:03.01
1993	Martin Roberts (AUS)		Oliver Lampe (GER)		Mitsuharu Takane (JPN)	
1995	Tom Malchow (USA)		Aleksandr Gorgurakiy (RUS) Mike Merrell (USA)		None awarded	
1997	Denys Sylantyev (UKR)	1:59.67	Jeffrey Julian (USA)	2:00.49	Shamek Pietucha (CAN)	2:00.66
1999	Jeff Somensatto (USA)		Aleksandr Gorgurakiy (RUS)		Philip Weiss (CAN)	
2001	Andrew Mahaney (USA)		Jeff Somensatto (USA)		Hisayoshi Tanaka (JPN)	
2003	Takeshi Matsuda (JPN)	1:57.44	Serhiy Advena (UKR)	1:58.74	Jeremy Knowles (BAH)	1:59.21
2005	Paweł Korzeniowski (POL)	1:56.52	Takeshi Matsuda (JPN)	1:57.55	Łukasz Drzewiński (POL)	1:58.13
2007	Ryusuke Sakata (JPN)	1:55.92	Chen Yin (CHN)	1:56.59	Daniel Madwed (USA)	1:57.16
2009	Paweł Korzeniowski (POL)	1:54.30	Kazuya Kaneda (JPN)	1:56.43	Ryusuke Sakata (JPN) Maxim Ganikhin (RUS)	1:56.75
2011	László Cseh (HUN)	1:55.87	Bobby Bollier (USA)	1:56.06	Hidemasa Sano (JPN)	1:56.81
2013	Bence Biczó (HUN)	1:55.32	Kenta Hirai (JPN)	1:55.90	Stefanos Dimitriadis (GRE)	1:57.36
2015	Evgenii Koptelov (RUS)	1:54.79	Yuya Yajima (JPN)	1:55.73	Masayuki Umemoto (JPN)	1:56.12
2017	Nao Horomura (JPN)	1:53.90	Daiya Seto (JPN)	1:55.09	Bence Biczó (HUN)	1:56.16
2019	Aleksandr Kudashev (RUS)	1:55.63	Nao Horomura (JPN)	1:55.94	Takumi Terada (JPN)	1:55.99
2021	Takumi Terada (JPN)	1:55.66	Wang Kuan-hung (TPE)	1:55.69	Chen Juner (CHN)	1:56.16

=== 200 m individual medley ===
Games	Gold		Silver		Bronze	
1981	Sergey Fesenko Sr. (URS)	2:06.34	Aleksey Markovsky (URS)	2:08.37	Alan Swanston (CAN)	2:09.48
1983	Alex Baumann (CAN)	2:02.29	Oleksandr Sydorenko (URS)	2:04.41	Ricardo Prado (BRA)	2:05.50
1985	Chris Rives (USA)	2:03.50	Duffy Dillon (USA)	2:04.65	Ricardo Prado (BRA)	2:04.92
1987	Neil Cochran (GBR)	2:05.08	Rob Woodhouse (AUS)	2:05.40	David Cademartori (USA)	2:06.04
1991	Greg Burgess (USA)	2:03.90	Matt Stahlman (USA)	2:04.67	Takahiro Fujimoto (JPN)	2:04.71
1993	Fraser Walker (GBR)		Vyacheslav Valdayev (UKR)		Jonathan Jennings (USA)	
1995	Tom Wilkens (USA)		Jo Yoshimi (JPN)		Jason Lancaster (USA)	
1997	Tatsuya Kinugasa (JPN)	2:04.32	Kristopher Babylon (USA)	2:04.88	Toshiaki Kurasawa (JPN)	2:05.19
1999	Tommy Hannan (USA)		Philip Weiss (CAN)		Takahiro Mori (JPN)	
2001	Takahiro Mori (JPN)		Kevin Clements (USA)		Peter Mankoč (SLO)	
2003	Takahiro Mori (JPN)	2:00.59	Joe Bruckart (USA)	2:01.57	Adam Lucas (AUS)	2:03.06
2005	Eric Shanteau (USA)	2:00.13	Vytautas Janušaitis (LTU)	2:00.98	Zhao Tao (CHN)	2:01.29
2007	Brian Johns (CAN)	1:59.97	Ken Takakuwa (JPN)	2:00.09	Łukasz Wójt (POL)	2:00.32
2009	Alex Vanderkaay (USA)	1:57.58	Keith Beavers (CAN)	1:59.83	Yuma Kosaka (JPN)	2:00.77
2011	László Cseh (HUN)	1:57.86	Yuya Horihata (JPN)	1:59.74	Yuma Kosaka (JPN)	1:59.81
2013	Justin James (AUS)	1:58.35	Hiromasa Fujimori (JPN)	1:58.76	Takahiro Tsutsumi (JPN)	1:59.54
2015	Justin James (AUS) Josh Prenot (USA)	1:58.38	None awarded		Keita Sunama (JPN)	1:58.45
2017	Kosuke Hagino (JPN)	1:57.35	Daiya Seto (JPN)	1:58.73	Joe Litchfield (GBR)	1:59.36
2019	Juran Mizohata (JPN)	1:58.88	Joe Litchfield (GBR)	1:59.28	Wang Hsing-hao (TPE)	1:59.87
2021	Gabriel Lopes (POR)	1:59.12	Wang Hsing-hao (TPE)	2:00.00	Marius Zobel (GER)	2:00.56

=== 400 m individual medley ===
Games	Gold		Silver		Bronze	
1965	Dick Roth (USA)	4:53.0	Carl Robie (USA)	4:55.3	Oleg Fotin (URS)	4:58.3
1967	Peter Williams (USA)	4:46.7	John Ferris (USA)	4:57.7	Toru Udo (JPN)	5:00.6
1970	Steve Power (USA)	4:46.1	Rick Colella (USA)	4:48.8	Reinhard Merkel (FRG)	4:56.5
1973	Sergei Zacharov (URS)	4:37.96	Steve Furniss (USA)	4:39.54	Lee Engstrand (USA)	4:40.13
1977	András Hargitay (HUN)	4:32.91	Zoltán Verrasztó (HUN)	4:34.19	Andy Ritchie (CAN)	4:35.30
1979	Djan Madruga (BRA)	4:37.34	Vladimir Mikheev (URS)	4:38.19	David Santos (USA)	4:38.57
1981	Sergey Fesenko Sr. (URS)	4:25.53	Peter Dobson (CAN)	4:31.65	Daniel Machek (TCH)	4:32.16
1983	Alex Baumann (CAN)	4:19.80	Bruce Hayes (USA)	4:26.05	Ricardo Prado (BRA)	4:26.87
1985	Ricardo Prado (BRA)	4:19.83	Rob Woodhouse (AUS)	4:20.76	Jeff Prior (USA)	4:23.91
1987	Rob Woodhouse (AUS)	4:22.90	Serghei Mariniuc (URS)	4:25.77	Shawn Rowland (USA)	4:26.23
1991	Takahiro Fujimoto (JPN)	4:23.10	Greg Burgess (USA)	4:24.53	Brent Harding (AUS)	4:26.20
1993	Iian Mull (USA)		Vyacheslav Valdayev (UKR)		Tatsuya Kinugasa (JPN)	
1995	Iian Mull (USA)		Tatsuya Kinugasa (JPN)		Andy Potts (USA)	
1997	Tatsuya Kinugasa (JPN)	4:24.18	Michael Halika (ISR)	4:24.96	Stefano Battistelli (ITA)	4:25.66
1999	Beau Wiebel (USA)		Michael Halika (ISR)		Takahiro Mori (JPN)	
2001	Kevin Clements (USA)		Carlos Sayão (CAN)		Tim Siciliano (USA)	
2003	Takahiro Mori (JPN)	4:17.23	Eric Shanteau (USA)	4:19.82	Michael Halika (ISR)	4:20.52
2005	Eric Shanteau (USA)	4:18.64	Peter Nagy (HUN)	4:20.05	Hidemasa Sano (JPN)	4:20.11
2007	Patrick Mellors (USA)	4:12.94	Alex Vanderkaay (USA)	4:17.34	Federico Turrini (ITA)	4:19.96
2009	Mateusz Matczak (POL)	4:12.28	Alex Vanderkaay (USA)	4:12.48	Yuya Horihata (JPN)	4:15.26
2011	László Cseh (HUN)	4:12.67	Yuya Horihata (JPN)	4:13.66	William Harris (USA)	4:15.40
2013	Michael Weiss (USA)	4:12.00	Takeharu Fujimori (JPN)	4:13.43	Lewis Smith (GBR)	4:16.86
2015	Jay Litherland (USA)	4:12.43	Josh Prenot (USA)	4:13.15	Keita Sunama (JPN)	4:13.98
2017	Daiya Seto (JPN)	4:11.98	Kosuke Hagino (JPN)	4:15.44	Aleksandr Osipenko (RUS)	4:16.63
2019	Yuki Ikari (JPN)	4:12.54	Sean Grieshop (USA)	4:13.90	Maxim Stupin (RUS)	4:15.37
2021	Kaito Tabuchi (JPN)	4:15.12	Pier Andrea Matteazzi (ITA)	4:15.64	Ei Kamikawabata (JPN)	4:17.87

=== 4×100 m freestyle ===
Games	Gold		Silver		Bronze	
1961	Japan (JPN); Keigo Shimizu(57.9); Kiyoshi Fukui(57.9); Haruo Yoshimuta(56.2); Tatsuo Fujimoto(56.7)	3:48.7	Soviet Union (URS)	3:57.2	Hungary (HUN)	3:58.1
1963	Japan (JPN); Toshizo Umemoto; Haruo Yoshimuta; Kiyoshi Fukui; Tatsuo Fujimoto	3:47.8	Hungary (HUN)	3:48.7	Italy (ITA); Bruno Bianchi; Giovanni Orlando; Pierpaolo Spangaro	3:49.8
1965	United States (USA); Gary Dilley; Gary Ilman; Donald Roth; Roy Saari	3:38.4	Soviet Union (URS)	3:41.4	Hungary (HUN)	3:42.2
1967	United States (USA); Ken Walsh; Don Havens; Greg Charlton; Zac Zorn	3:32.6	Great Britain (GBR)	3:40.2	Japan (JPN); Kunihiro Iwasaki; Satoru Nakano; Teruhiko Kitani	3:42.2
1970	United States (USA); Don Havens; Jim McConica; Dave O'Mallay; Frank Heckl	3:33.3	Soviet Union (URS)	3:36.1	Great Britain (GBR)	3:45.8
1973	United States (USA); Mark Elliot; Paul Tietre; Dean Anderson; Kenneth Knox	-	Soviet Union (URS)	-	West Germany (FRG)	-
1977	United States (USA); Andy Coan; Doug Lambert; Mike Curington; John Ebuna	3:31.49	West Germany (FRG)	3:31.75	Soviet Union (URS)	3:33.24
1981	United States (USA); Jerry Spencer; Andy Schmidt; Paul Goodridge; Kris Kirchner	3:27.84	Soviet Union (URS); Yuri Presekin; Alexey Filonov; Aleksey Markovsky; Serhiy Krasyuk	3:28.09	Brazil (BRA); Jorge Fernandes; Marcus Mattioli; Ronald Menezes; Djan Madruga	3:32.42
1983	Soviet Union (URS)	3:21.72	United States (USA); Tom Jager; Chris Silva; Dallas Kyle; Bruce Hayes	3:21.82	Canada (CAN); Peter Szmidt; Wayne Kelly; Jeff Sheehan	3:26.38
1985	United States (USA); Scott McCadam; Jim Born; Craig Oppel; Matt Biondi	3:20.12	West Germany (FRG)	3:22.70	Soviet Union (URS)	3:23.76
1987	United States (USA); Eric Hansen; David Kerska; Tom Williams; Joel Thomas	3:23.56	Netherlands (NED)	3:24.02	West Germany (FRG)	3:26.08
1991	United States (USA); Keith Anderson; Josh Davis; Eric Hansen; Alyn Towne	3:22.73	France (FRA)	3:23.48	Germany (GER)	3:23.61
1993	United States (USA); Brian Kurza; Seth Pepper; Michael Picotte; David Fox		Germany (GER)		Poland (POL)	
1995	United States (USA); Brad Schumacher; Scott Tucker; Oliver Gumbril; Josh Davis		Brazil (BRA)		Great Britain (GBR)	
1997	United States (USA); Brock Newman; Brian Esway; Jason Lezak; Daniel Jones	3:21.17	Australia (AUS)	3:23.75	France (FRA)	3:23.88
1999	Australia (AUS); Stephen Goudie; Richard Upton; Robert Wyllie; Adam Pine		Italy (ITA)		United States (USA)	
2001	Great Britain (GBR); Matthew Kidd; Alex Scotcher; Chris Cozens; Paul Belk		United States (USA)		France (FRA)	
2003	Great Britain (GBR); Chris Cozens; Alex Scotcher; Ross Davenport; Matthew Kidd	3:22.09	Ukraine (UKR); Vyacheslav Shyrshov; Denys Syzonenko; Andriy Serdinov; Yuriy Yegoshin	3:22.37	Australia (AUS); Andrew Dyson; Patrick Murphy; Benjamin Denner; Andrew Mewing	3:22.80
2005	France (FRA); Antoine Galavtine; Sébastien Bodet; Matthieu Madelaine; Alain Bernard	3:19.91	Great Britain (GBR); Chris Cozens; Todd Cooper; Alex Scotcher; Ross Davenport	3:20.27	United States (USA); Terrence Silkaitis; Ryan Verlatti; Kyle Ransom; Matt Grevers	3:20.45
2007	United States (USA); Matthew McGinnis; Matt Grevers; Bryan Lundquist; Adam Ritter	3:16.06	Canada (CAN); Richard Hortness; Brian Johns; Chad Hankewich; Darryl Rudolf	3:18.57	Russia (RUS); Yevgeny Lagunov; Sergey Perunin; Andrey Grechin; Yury Prilukov	3:18.73
2009	(United States) USA; Will Copeland (48.39); Chris Brady (48.22); Eric McGinnis (49.71); Scot Robison (48.42)	3:14.74	Italy; Michele Santucci (49.95); Nicola Cassio (48.90); Vittorio Dinia (48.71); Andrea Rolla (48.51); Lorenzo Benatti	3:16.07	France; Antoine Galavtine (50.22); Sébastien Bodet (48.44); Kevin Trannoy (48.96); Boris Steimetz (48.95); Joris Hustache	3:16.57
2011	United States; Jimmy Feigen (49.27); Tim Phillips (48.96); Kohlton Norys (48.73); Bobby Savulich (48.88)	3:15.84	Brazil; Marcos Macedo (50.02); Marcelo Chierighini (48.86); Henrique Martins (50.34); Nicolas Oliveira (48.08)	3:17.30	France; Clément Lefert (49.56); Guillaume Strohmeyer (50.14); Joris Hustache (49.48); Lorys Bourelly (49.60)	3:18.78
2013	Russia (RUS); Andrey Grechin; Danila Izotov; Nikita Lobintsev; Vladimir Morozov	3:10.88	Australia (AUS); Andrew Abood; Daniel Arnamnart; Jayden Hadler; Justin James	3:16.33	Italy (ITA); Lorenzo Benatti; Gianluca Maglia; Stefano Pizzamiglio; Michele Santucci	3:16.64
2015	United States (USA); Matthew Ellis (49.86); Michael Wynalda (49.38); Jack Conger (47.75); Seth Stubblefield (48.86); Paul Powers^{[a]} Clay Youngquist^{[a]} John Murray^{[a]}	3:15.85	Japan (JPN); Reo Sakata (50.06); Kosuke Matsui (49.75); Takumi Komatsu (49.49); Toru Maruyama (48.68)	3:17.98	Russia (RUS); Ivan Kuzmenko (50.22); Oleg Tikhobaev (49.55); Alexander Tikhonov (50.17); Mikhail Polischuk (48.24); Dmitrii Ermakov^{[a]}	3:18.18
2017	United States (USA); Maxime Rooney (49.02); Ryan Held (48.25); Justin Ress (48.07); Justin Lynch (48.67); Zach Harting^{[a]} Taylor Dale^{[a]}	3:14.01	Italy (ITA); Lorenzo Zazzeri (48.89); Ivano Vendrame (48.47); Alex Di Giorgio (49.60); Alessandro Miressi (48.28)	3:15.24	Russia (RUS); Mikhail Vekovishchev (49.09); Andrey Arbuzov (49.23); Sergey Fesikov (49.60); Nikita Korolev (48.53); Aleksei Brianskiy^{[a]}	3:15.78
2019	United States (USA); Zach Apple (47.79); Dean Farris (47.48); Robert Howard (47.74); Tate Jackson (48.02); Michael Jensen^{[a]}	3:11.03	Brazil (BRA); Luiz Gustavo Borges (49.57); Marco Antônio Ferreira (48.00); Gabriel Ogawa (49.57); Felipe de Souza (48.13)	3:15.27	Italy (ITA); Ivano Vendrame (48.91); Alessandro Bori (48.87); Davide Nardini (49.10); Giovanni Izzo (49.03)	3:15.91
2021	Poland; Kamil Sieradzki; Dominik Dudys; Mateusz Chowaniec; Jakub Kraska; Piotr Ludwiczak^{[a]} Marcel Wągrowski^{[a]}	3:14.60	Brazil; Pedro Spajari; Lucas Peixoto; Breno Correia; Vinícius Assunção	3:15.30	Italy; Paolo Conte Bonin; Giovanni Carraro; Nicolò Franceschi; Giovanni Izzo	3:15.62

=== 4×200 m freestyle ===
Games	Gold		Silver		Bronze	
1959	Italy (ITA)	8:53.1	Hungary (HUN)	9:07.7	West Germany (FRG)	9:08.8
1965	United States (USA); Dick Roth; Roy Saari; Donald Roth; Gary Ilman	8:10.9	Soviet Union (URS)	8:14.4	Japan (JPN); Kazuyuki Iwamoto; Kunihiro Iwasaki; Takeshi Yamakage	8:19.1
1967	United States (USA); Greg Charlton; John Nelson; Charlie Hickcox; Carl Robie	7:56.5	Great Britain (GBR)	8:12.0	Japan (JPN)	8:12.6
1970	United States (USA); Andy Strenk; Dave O'Mallay; Jim McConica; Frank Heckl	7:53.7	Soviet Union (URS)	8:08.0	Great Britain (GBR)	8:26.0
1973	Soviet Union (URS)	7:43.28	United States (USA); Elliot; Reeder; Jack Tingley; Steve Furniss	7:43.61	Brazil (BRA); José Namorado; José Aranha; James Huxley Adams; Alfredo Machado	8:02.06
1977	United States (USA); John Weston; Mike Curington; John Ebuna; Dick Hannula Jr.	7:41.20	Soviet Union (URS)	7:42.55	West Germany (FRG)	7:48.27
1979	United States (USA); Charles Sharpe; Keith Dickson; Bill O'Brien; John Hillencamp	7:36.03	Soviet Union (URS)	7:40.40	Italy (ITA)	7:49.20
1981	Soviet Union (URS)	7:33.96	United States (USA); Andy Schmidt; Jimmy Lee; B. McCarthy; Kris Kirchner	7:34.11	Brazil (BRA)	7:38.32
1983	Soviet Union (URS)	7:27.22	United States (USA); Stewart Macdonald; Rich Bodor; Bruce Hayes; Richard Saeger	7:30.18	Canada (CAN); Wayne Kelly; David Shemilt	7:31.40
1985	United States (USA); Craig Oppel; Charley Siroky; Duffy Dillon; Matt Biondi	7:20.34	West Germany (FRG)	7:22.43	Canada (CAN)	7:30.81
1987	United States (USA); Joe Parker; Brent Lang; John Hodge; Jeffrey Olsen	7:29.30	Netherlands (NED)	7:29.86	Great Britain (GBR)	7:31.95
1991	Soviet Union (URS)	7:23.28	United States (USA); Josh Davis; Vince Giambalvo; Dan Kanner; Greg Larson	7:24.54	Canada (CAN)	7:32.89
1993	United States (USA); John Keppeler; Dan Phillips; Rodney Van Tassell; Ryan Berube		France (FRA)		Germany (GER)	
1995	United States (USA); Josh Davis; Daniel Kanner; Chris Rumley; Brad Schumacher		France (FRA)		Japan (JPN)	
1997	United States (USA); Chris Eckerman; Scott Goldblatt; James Rauch; Jay Schryver	7:26.78	France (FRA)	7:28.59	Germany (GER)	7:31.37
1999	United States (USA); Eric Godsman; David Hartzel; Mark Leonard; Mark Warkentin		Ukraine (UKR)		Italy (ITA)	
2001	Italy (ITA); Andrea Beccari; Nicola Selleri; Matteo Pelliciari; Federico Cappellazzo		United States (USA)		France (FRA)	
2003	Russia (RUS); Andrey Kapralov; Maksim Kuznetsov; Dmitry Chernyshyov; Yury Prilukov	7:19.63	United States (USA); Joseph Bruckart; Justin Mortimer; Chris Kemp; Peter Vanderkaay	7:20.67	Italy (ITA); Andrea Frovi; David Berbotto; Andrea Beccari; Federico Cappellazzo	7:20.92
2005	Italy (ITA); Andrea Frovi; Alessandro Calvi; Luca Pasteris; Nicola Cassio	7:19.51	Japan (JPN); Yoshihiro Okumura; Daisuke Hosokawa; Hisayoshi Sato; Takeshi Matsuda	7:20.31	United States (USA); Terrence Silkaitis; Michael Klueh; Justin Mortimer; Doug Van Wie	7:20.54
2007	United States (USA); Matthew McGinnis; Adam Ritter; Doug Van Wie; Michael Klueh	7:13.72	Russia (RUS); Yevgeny Lagunov; Sergey Perunin; Nikita Lobintsev; Yury Prilukov	7:16.20	Italy (ITA); Andrea Busato; Michele Cosentino; Andrea Giavi; Nicola Cassio	7:17.93
2009	Japan; Sho Uchida (1:47.81); Shogo Hihara (1:46.72); Yasunori Mononobe (1:48.89); Shunsuke Kuzuhara (1:48.12)	7:11.54	(United States) USA; Scot Robison (1:48.18); Bobby Bollier (1:49.65); Matt Patton (1:47.58); Alex Vanderkaay (1:48.79); Chad La Tourette	7:14.20	Canada; Ray Betuzzi (1:48.37); Brian Johns (1:46.33); Keith Beavers (1:50.65); Matthew Swanston (1:51.10); Rory Biskupski	7:16.45
2011	United States; Michael Klueh (1:48.79); Dax Hill (1:48.89); Matt Bartlett (1:48.62); Matt McLean (1:47.24)	7:13.54	Japan; Sho Sotodate (1:49.14); Yuya Horihata (1:48.08); Yuma Kosaka (1:49.30); Sho Uchida (1:48.14)	7:14.66	Australia; David McKeon (1:48.92); Mitchell Dixon (1:49.58); Kristopher Taylor (1:49.76); Nick Ffrost (1:49.32)	7:17.58
2013	Russia (RUS); Danila Izotov; Nikita Lobintsev; Artem Lobuzov; Alexandr Sukhorukov	7:05.49	United States (USA); Michael Weiss; Michael Wynalda; Austin Surhoff; Matthew Barber	7:13.58	Australia (AUS); Ryan Napoleon; Justin James; George O'Brien; Shane Asbury	7:15.50
2015	United States (USA); Clay Youngquist (1:49.03); Reed Malone (1:47.06); Michael Wynalda (1:47.25); Kyle Whitaker (1:47.48); Andrew Cosgarea^{[a]} Andrew Seliskar^{[a]} John Lewis^{[a]}	7:10.82	Australia (AUS); Jacob Hansford (1:48.13); Travis Mahoney (1:48.05); Jack McLoughlin (1:48.42); Justin James (1:48.44); Jared Gilliland^{[a]} Nic Brown^{[a]}	7:13.04	Japan (JPN); Naito Ehara (1:48.95); Reo Sakata (1:47.60); Katsuhiro Matsumoto (1:48.15); Takumi Komatsu (1:48.42)	7:13.12
2017	Japan (JPN); Katsuhiro Matsumoto (1:47.42); Reo Sakata (1:47.25); Yuki Kobori (1:46.95); Kosuke Hagino (1:46.83); Shuhei Suyama^{[a]} Daiya Seto^{[a]}	7:08.45	United States (USA); Mitch D'Arrigo (1:47.89); Maxime Rooney (1:47.36); Grant Shoults (1:48.11); Jonathan Roberts (1:48.83); Grant Sanders^{[a]} Kevin Litherland^{[a]} Austin Katz^{[a]}	7:12.19	Russia (RUS); Viacheslav Andrusenko (1:49.39); Elisei Stepanov (1:48.53); Ernest Maksumov (1:48.74); Mikhail Vekovishchev (1:46.81); Aleksandr Kudashev^{[a]} Aleksandr Fedorov^{[a]}	7:13.47
2019	United States (USA); Dean Farris (1:48.73); Grant House (1:47.89); Trenton Julian (1:46.99); Zach Apple (1:46.16); Sean Grieshop^{[a]} Zachary Yeadon^{[a]}	7:09.77	Italy (ITA); Mattia Zuin (1:48.36); Matteo Ciampi (1:47.03); Alessio Proietti Colonna (1:48.72); Stefano Di Cola (1:46.32)	7:10.43	Australia (AUS); Maxwell Carleton (1:49.43); Ashton Brinkworth (1:48.21); Brendon Smith (1:49.18); Jacob Hansford (1:47.93); Cameron Tysoe^{[a]}	7:14.75
2021	Japan; Konosuke Yanagimoto; Ikki Imoto; Genki Terakado; Shui Kurokawa; Temma Watanabe^{[a]}	7:14.86	Italy; Alessio Proietti Colonna; Giovanni Caserta; Matteo Lamberti; Davide Marchello	7:15.34	Brazil; Breno Correia; Vinícius Assunção; Eduardo de Moraes; Kaique Alves; Matheus Gonche^{[a]}	7:15.39

=== 4×100 m medley relay ===
Games	Gold		Silver		Bronze	
1959	Italy (ITA)	4:20.4	Czechoslovakia (TCH)	4:27.6	West Germany (FRG)	4:28.5
1961	Japan (JPN); Shigeo Fukushima (1:04.4); Yoshiaki Shikiishi (1:13.9); Haruo Yoshimuta (1:11.9); Tatsuo Fujimoto (56.9)	4:17.1	Czechoslovakia (TCH)	4:18.5	Soviet Union (URS)	4:21.4
1963	Hungary (HUN)	4:14.4	Italy (ITA)	4:15.2	West Germany (FRG)	4:18.7
1965	United States (USA); Thompson Mann; Tom Tretheway; Philip Riker; Donald Roth	4:03.9	Soviet Union (URS)	4:03.9	Hungary (HUN)	4:06.4
1967	United States (USA); Charlie Hickcox; Ken Merten; Doug Russell; Ken Walsh	3:57.2	Japan (JPN)	4:04.9	Great Britain (GBR)	4:09.1
1970	United States (USA); Mitch Ivey; Ken Shilling; John Ferris; Frank Heckl	3:59.9	Soviet Union (URS)	4:03.9	Japan (JPN)	4:05.8
1973	United States (USA); David Johnson; Mark Chatfield; Allan Poucher; Kenneth Knox	3:55.15	Soviet Union (URS)	3:56.07	West Germany (FRG)	4:02.65
1977	United States (USA); Jim Ballard; Lance Michaelis; Mike Curington; John Ebuna	3:51.67	Canada (CAN)	3:53.67	Soviet Union (URS)	3:54.34
1979	United States (USA); Lou Mangianello; David Lundberg; Mike Bottom; Kirk Peppas	3:51.29	Soviet Union (URS)	3:52.05	West Germany (FRG)	3:55.40
1981	Soviet Union (URS); Sergei Zabolotnov; Arsens Miskarovs; Sergei Kiselyov; Serhiy Krasyuk	3:48.75	United States (USA); Dave Wilson; Nicholas Nevid; Bob Placak; Kris Kirchner	3:49.55	Brazil (BRA); Rômulo Arantes; Luiz Carvalho; Marcus Mattioli; Jorge Fernandes	3:55.10
1983	Soviet Union (URS)	3:44.33	Canada (CAN)	3:46.49	United States (USA)	3:46.65
1985	United States (USA); Mark Rhodenbaugh; John Moffet; Chris O'Neil; Scott McCadam	3:42.99	Soviet Union (URS)	3:46.33	West Germany (FRG)	3:47.71
1987	United States (USA); David Berkoff; Todd Torres; Jay Mortenson; Eric Hansen	3:45.72	Japan (JPN)	3:46.27	West Germany (FRG)	3:48.73
1991	United States (USA); Eric Hansen; Dan Kutler; Brian Pajer; Tripp Schwenk	3:44.33	Germany (GER)	3:44.65	Soviet Union (URS)	3:45.76
1993	United States (USA); Tripp Schwenk; Jud Crawford; Seth Pepper; David Fox		Germany (GER)		Japan (JPN)	
1995	United States (USA); Kurt Jachimowski; Leif Engstrom-Heg; Jason Lancaster; Josh Davis		Japan (JPN)		Russia (RUS)	
1997	United States (USA); Bobby Brewer; Kevin Kling; Steve Martyak; Daniel Jones	3:41.95	Italy (ITA)	3:44.26	Russia (RUS)	3:44.98
1999	United States (USA); Matt Ulrickson; Jeremy McDonnell; Matthew Pierce; Greg Busse		Russia (RUS)		Japan (JPN)	
2001	United States (USA); Peter Marshall; David Denniston; Andy Haidinyak; Scott VonSchoff		Ukraine (UKR); Volodymyr Nikolaychuk; Oleh Lisohor; Andriy Serdinov; Vyacheslav Shyrshov		France (FRA); Simon Dufour; Tony De Pellegrini; Sebastien Lequeux; Romain Barnier	
2003	Ukraine (UKR); Volodymyr Nikolaychuk; Oleh Lisohor; Andriy Serdinov; Yuriy Yegoshin	3:47.46	Russia (RUS); Dmitri Smirnov; Roman Ivanovsky; Yevgeny Korotyshkin; Andrey Kapralov	3:39.05	United States (USA); James Westcott; Wilson Brandt; John Abercrombie; Joseph Bruckart	3:40.18
2005	Ukraine (UKR); Anton Bugayov; Oleh Lisohor; Serhiy Advena; Denys Syzonenko	3:38.49	United States (USA); Matt Grevers; Kevin Swander; Peter Verhoef; Terrence Silkaitis	3:39.35	Japan (JPN); Masafumi Yamaguchi; Makoto Yamashita; Ryuichi Shibata; Hisayoshi Sato	3:39.36
2007	Russia (RUS); Dmitri Smirnov; Grigory Falko; Yevgeny Korotyshkin; Andrey Grechin	3:36.17	United States (USA); Nick Thoman; Matthew Lowe; Matt Grevers; Adam Ritter	3:37.42	Ukraine (UKR); Andriy Oleynyk; Valeriy Dymo; Serhiy Breus; Yuriy Yegoshin	3:37.74
2009	Japan (JPN); Ryosuke Irie (52.75); Hiromasa Sakimoto (59.63); Shimpei Irie (52.05); Rammaru Harada (48.37)	3:32.80	Italy (ITA); Enrico Catalano (55.08); Fabio Scozzoli (59.68); Rudy Goldin (52.28); Vittorio Dinia (48.71)	3:35.75	France (FRA); Eric Ress (55.57); Tony de Pellegrini (1:01.37); Cyril Marchant (53.41); Boris Steimetz (47.96)	3:38.31
2011	Japan (JPN); Ryosuke Irie (53.56); Ryo Tateishi (1:00.04); Masayuki Kishida (52.46); Shinri Shioura (48.96)	3:35.02	United States (USA); Rex Tullius (55.15); Adam Klein (1:01.17); Tim Phillips (52.55); Jimmy Feigen (49.05)	3:37.92	New Zealand (NZL); Gareth Kean (54.24); Glenn Snyders (59.63); Kurt Bassett (54.60); Matthew Stanley (50.28) Italy (ITA); Sebastiano Ranfagni (55.17); Mattia Pesce (1:01.16); Paolo Facchinelli (53.27); Luca Leonardi (49.15)	3:38.75
2013	Russia (RUS); Vladimir Morozov; Kirill Strelnikov; Evgenii Koptelov; Andrey Grechin	3:34.27	Japan (JPN); Yuki Shirai; Yasuhiro Koseki; Masayuki Umemoto; Katsumi Nakamura	3:34.41	United States (USA); Jack Conger; Mihail Alexandrov; Kyler Van Swol; Michael Wynalda	3:34.63
2015	Russia (RUS); Andrey Shabasov (54.74); Oleg Kostin (1:00.26); Evgenii Koptelov (51.03); Mikhail Polischuk (48.53)	3:34.56	United States (USA); Jacob Pebley (54.42); Daniel MacDonald (1:00.73); Matthew Josa (51.51); Jack Conger (47.95)	3:34.61	Japan (JPN); Junya Hasegawa (54.18); Kazuki Kohinata (1:00.21); Masayuki Umemoto (51.48); Toru Maruyama (48.95)	3:34.82
2017	United States (USA); Justin Ress (53.44); Andrew Wilson (59.29); Justin Lynch (52.70); Ryan Held (47.84)	3:33.27	Russia (RUS); Roman Larin (54.71); Rustam Gadirov (1:00.24); Aleksandr Sadovnikov (51.49); Mikhail Vekovishchev (48.41)	3:34.85	Japan (JPN); Kosuke Hagino (54.23); Mamoru Mori (1:00.51); Yuki Kobori (52.25); Katsumi Nakamura (47.89)	3:34.88
2019	United States (USA); Justin Ress (53.31); Ian Finnerty (1:00.36); John Shebat (51.80); Zach Apple (47.55)	3:33.02	Russia (RUS); Grigoriy Tarasevich (53.94); Kirill Prigoda (59.14); Egor Kuimov (51.86); Ivan Kuzmenko (48.78)	3:33.72	Brazil (BRA); Gabriel Fantoni (54.15); Pedro Cardona (1:00.98); Iago Moussalem (52.08); Marco Antônio Ferreira (48.12)	3:33.72
2021	China; Wang Gukailai; Qin Haiyang; Chen Juner; Lin Tao; Zhang Zhoujian^{[a]} Yu Zongda^{[a]} Wang Yi^{[a]}	3:32.58	Italy; Simone Stefanì; Alessandro Pinzuti; Christian Ferraro; Giovanni Izzo; Michele Lamberti^{[a]} Ludovico Viberti^{[a]} Michele Busa^{[a]} Giovanni Carraro^{[a]}	3:33.14	Japan; Riku Matsuyama; Yamato Fukasawa; Genki Terakado; Juran Mizohata; Konosuke Yanagimoto^{[a]} Yu Hanaguruma^{[a]} Takumi Terada^{[a]} Reo Miura^{[a]}	3:35.04

=== 10k marathon ===
Games	Gold		Silver		Bronze	
2011	Simone Ruffini (ITA)	1:58:00.74	Kirill Abrosimov (RUS)	2:00:03.35	Yasunari Hirai (JPN)	2:00:05.54
2013	Matteo Furlan (ITA)	1:56:12.4	Romain Beraud (FRA)	1:56:14.4	Andreas Waschburger (GER)	1:56:16.3
2015	Anton Evsikov (RUS)	1:55:09.6	Matteo Furlan (ITA)	1:55:09.9	Mario Sanzullo (ITA)	1:55:11.0
2017	Gregorio Paltrinieri (ITA)	1:54:52.4	Sören Meißner (GER)	1:55:01.5	Krzysztof Pielowski (POL)	1:55:19.6

== Notes ==
^{a} Swimmers who participated in the heats only and received medals.

== See also ==
- List of Universiade medalists in swimming (women)
