= Bruce Rogers =

Bruce Rogers may refer to:

- Bruce Rogers (typographer) (1870–1957), American typographer
- Bruce Rogers (broadcaster) (1933–2026), Canadian broadcaster
- Bruce Rogers (swimmer) (born 1957), Canadian swimmer
- Bruce Holland Rogers (born 1958), American writer
- Bruce Rogers (didgeridoo) (1964–2016), Australian didgeridoo maker, performer and teacher
