= Verrasztó =

Verrasztó is a surname. Notable people with the surname include:

- Dávid Verrasztó (born 1988), Hungarian swimmer
- Evelyn Verrasztó (born 1989), Hungarian swimmer
- Zoltán Verrasztó (born 1956), Hungarian swimmer
