= Swimming at the 1999 Summer Universiade =

Swimming at the XX Summer Universiade
- Venues: Piscina Municipal de Son Hugo
- Dates: 4 July 1999 – 9 July 1999

The swimming competition at the 1999 Summer Universiade took place in Palma de Mallorca, Spain from July 4 to July 9, 1999.

== Men's events ==
Event	Gold	Silver	Bronze
50 m freestyle	Aaron Ciarla (USA)	Dean Hutchinson (USA)	Ricardo Dornelas (BRA)
100 m freestyle	Denis Pimankov (RUS)	Mauro Gallo (ITA)	Nicholas Folker (RSA)
200 m freestyle	Mark Warkentin (USA)	Lionel Poirot (FRA)	Dmitriy Chernyshev (RUS)
400 m freestyle	Mark Warkentin (USA)	Andrea Righi (ITA)	Denys Zavhorodnyy (UKR)
800 m freestyle	Mark Warkentin (USA)	Andrea Righi (ITA)	Denys Zavhorodnyy (UKR)
1500 m freestyle	Andrea Righi (ITA)	Mark Leonard (USA)	Daniel Vidal (ESP)
100 m backstroke	Simon Thirsk (RSA)	Keitaro Konnai (JPN)	Atsushi Nishikori (JPN)
200 m backstroke	Beau Wiebel (USA)	Tate Blahnik (USA)	Greg Hamm (CAN)
100 m breaststroke	Andrey Perminov (RUS)	Akira Hayashi (JPN)	Sébastien Muff (FRA)
200 m breaststroke	Roman Makarov (RUS)	Yoshiaki Okita (JPN)	Andrey Perminov (RUS)
100 m butterfly	Adam Pine (AUS)	Burl Reid (AUS)	Matthew Pierce (USA)
200 m butterfly	Jeff Somensatto (USA)	Aleksandr Gorgurakiy (RUS)	Philip Weiss (CAN)
200 m individual medley	Tommy Hannan (USA)	Philip Weiss (CAN)	Takahiro Mori (JPN)
400 m individual medley	Beau Wiebel (USA)	Michael Halika (ISR)	Takahiro Mori (JPN)
4 × 100 m freestyle relay	Australia (AUS)	Italy (ITA)	United States (USA)
4 × 200 m freestyle relay	United States (USA)	Ukraine (UKR)	Italy (ITA)
4 × 100 m medley relay	United States (USA)	Russia (RUS)	Japan (JPN)

== Women's events ==
Event	Gold	Silver	Bronze
50 m freestyle	Courtney Allen (USA)	Cristina Chiuso (ITA)	Ana Belén Palomo (ESP)
100 m freestyle	Ioana Diaconescu (ROU)	Cassidy Maxwell (USA)	Courtney Allen (USA)
200 m freestyle	Kim Black (USA)	Ioana Diaconescu (ROU)	Meike Freitag (GER)
400 m freestyle	Hana Černá (CZE)	Jana Pechanová (CZE)	Katie Zimbone (USA)
800 m freestyle	Cara Lane (USA)	Jana Pechanová (CZE)	Julie Varozza (USA)
1500 m freestyle	Cara Lane (USA)	Julie Varozza (USA)	Hana Černá (CZE)
100 m backstroke	Noriko Inada (JPN)	Tomoko Hagiwara (JPN)	Ilona Hlaváčková (CZE)
200 m backstroke	Miki Nakao (JPN)	Tomoko Hagiwara (JPN)	Linda Riker (USA)
100 m breaststroke	Amy Balcerzak (USA)	Amanda Beard (USA)	Brooke Hanson (AUS)
200 m breaststroke	Yuko Sakaguchi (JPN)	Brooke Hanson (AUS)	Amy Balcerzak (USA)
100 m butterfly	Tomoko Hagiwara (JPN)	Julia Ham (AUS)	Pang Ran (CHN)
200 m butterfly	María Peláez (ESP)	Pang Ran (CHN)	Noriko Maekawa (JPN)
200 m individual medley	Tomoko Hagiwara (JPN)	Sabine Herbst (GER)	Elizabeth Warden (CAN)
400 m individual medley	Hana Černá (CZE)	Beatrice Câșlaru (ROU)	Corrie Murphy (USA)
4 × 100 m freestyle relay	United States (USA)	Italy (ITA)	China (CHN)
4 × 200 m freestyle relay	Canada (CAN)	Italy (ITA)	Great Britain (GBR)
4 × 100 m medley relay	Japan (JPN)	United States (USA)	Ukraine (UKR)

== Medal table ==
Rank	Nation	Gold	Silver	Bronze	Total
1	United States (USA)	16	7	8	31
2	Japan (JPN)	6	5	5	16
3	Russia (RUS)	3	2	2	7
4	Australia (AUS)	2	3	1	6
5	Czech Republic (CZE)	2	2	2	6
6	Italy (ITA)	1	7	1	9
7	Romania (ROU)	1	2	0	3
8	Canada (CAN)	1	1	3	5
9	Spain (ESP)	1	0	2	3
10	South Africa (RSA)	1	0	1	2
11	Ukraine (UKR)	0	1	3	4
12	China (CHN)	0	1	2	3
13	France (FRA)	0	1	1	2
13	Germany (GER)	0	1	1	2
15	Israel (ISR)	0	1	0	1
16	Brazil (BRA)	0	0	1	1
16	Great Britain (GBR)	0	0	1	1
Totals (17 entries)		34	34	34	102
