= Swimming at the 1979 Summer Universiade =

Swimming at the X Summer Universiade

The swimming competition at the 1979 Summer Universiade took place in Mexico City, Mexico in September 1979.

== Men's events ==
| Event | Gold | | Silver | | Bronze | |
|---|---|---|---|---|---|---|
| 100 m freestyle | Marcello Guarducci; Italy | 51.88 | Kirk Peppas; United States | 51.91 | Bruce Stahl; United States | 52.32 |
| 200 m freestyle | Bill O'Brien; United States | 1:54.00 | Sergey Rusin; Soviet Union | 1:54.55 | Keith Dickson; United States | 1:54.62 |
| 400 m freestyle | Sergey Rusin; Soviet Union | 4:02.26 | John Hillencamp; United States | 4:05.23 | Graeme Brewer; Australia | 4:05.32 |
| 1500 m freestyle | Ron Neugent; United States | 16:01.87 | Igor Kushpelev; Soviet Union | 16:09.22 | Bill O'Brien; United States | 16:13.88 |
| 100 m backstroke | Mark Kerry; Australia | 57.05 | Rômulo Arantes; Brazil | 58.10 | Mike Bottom; United States | 58.55 |
| 200 m backstroke | Kyle Miller; United States | 2:07.30 | Djan Madruga; Brazil | 2:07.70 | Ron Raikula; United States | 2:07.81 |
| 100 m breaststroke | Vladimir Fliont; Soviet Union | 1:05.45 | John Lundberg; United States | 1:06.15 | Vladimir Tarassov; Soviet Union | 1:06.44 |
| 200 m breaststroke | Vladimir Tarassov; Soviet Union | 2:21.13 | Timur Podmarev; Soviet Union | 2:21.31 | Tateki Shinya; Japan | 2:25.53 |
| 100 m butterfly | Mike Bottom; United States | 55.37 | James Halliburton; United States | 56.15 | Miloslav Rolko; Czechoslovakia | 56.53 |
| 200 m butterfly | Mikhail Gorelik; Soviet Union | 2:04.50 | Michael Kraus; West Germany | 2:06.25 | Sergei Kiselyov; Soviet Union | 2:06.41 |
| 400 m individual medley | Djan Madruga; Brazil | 4:37.34 | Vladimir Mikheev; Soviet Union | 4:38.19 | David Santos; United States | 4:38.57 |
| 4 × 200 m freestyle relay | United States (USA); Sharpe; Keith Dickson; Bill O'Brien; John Hillencamp | 7:36.03 | Soviet Union (URS) | 7:40.40 | Italy (ITA) | 7:49.20 |
| 4 × 100 m medley relay | United States (USA); Lou Mangianello; David Lundberg; Mike Bottom; Kirk Peppas | 3:51.29 | Soviet Union (URS) | 3:52.05 | West Germany (FRG) | 3:55.40 |

Legend: CR – Championship record; CWR – Commonwealth record; NR – National record

== Women's events ==
| Event | Gold | | Silver | | Bronze | |
|---|---|---|---|---|---|---|
| 100 m freestyle | Amy Caulkins; United States | 58.26 | Sue Hinderaker; United States | 58.67 | Annelies Maas; Netherlands | 58.71 |
| 200 m freestyle | Annelies Maas; Netherlands | 2:04.87 | Bonnie Glasgow; United States | 2:07.24 | Maura Walsh; United States | 2:08.84 |
| 400 m freestyle | Corrina Weinkofsky; United States | 4:22.88 | Bonnie Glasgow; United States | 4:25.92 | Annelies Maas; Netherlands | 4:28.03 |
| 800 m freestyle | Margaret Brooksbank; United States | 9:04.32 | Annelies Maas; Netherlands | 9:13.62 | Cyndi McCullam; United States | 9:18.28 |
| 100 m backstroke | Carmen Bunaciu; Romania | 1:03.35 | Margaret Browne; United States | 1:05.63 | Christine Breedy; United States | 1:05.75 |
| 200 m backstroke | Carmen Bunaciu; Romania | 2:16.20 | Margaret Browne; United States | 2:23.08 | Christine Breedy; United States | 2:25.86 |
| 100 m breaststroke | Irena Fleissnerová; Czechoslovakia | 1:14.57 | Debbie Rudd; Great Britain | 1:14.74 | Anna Skolarczyk; Poland | 1:14.94 |
| 200 m breaststroke | Irena Fleissnerová; Czechoslovakia | 2:41.00 | Debbie Rudd; Great Britain | 2:41.88 | Anna Skolarczyk; Poland | 2:42.81 |
| 100 m butterfly | Elizabeth Rapp; United States | 1:04.04 | Sue Hinderaker; United States | 1:04.88 | Alla Gritchenkova; Soviet Union | 1:05.28 |
| 200 m butterfly | Elizabeth Rapp; United States | 2:19.11 | Alla Gritchenkova; Soviet Union | 2:19.57 | Jody Alexander; United States | 2:20.38 |
| 400 m individual medley | Janet Buchan; United States | 5:06.6 | Bonnie Glasgow; United States | 5:08.1 | Irena Fleissnerová; Czechoslovakia | 5:12.8 |
| 4 × 100 m freestyle relay | United States (USA); B.Harris; Sue Hinderaker; Bonnie Glasgow; Amy Caulkins | 3:56.75 | Netherlands (NED) | 3:59.16 | Canada (CAN) | 4:01.15 |
| 4 × 100 m medley relay | United States (USA); Christine Breedy; Gayle Hegel; Elizabeth Rapp; Amy Caulkins | 4:22.8 | Soviet Union (URS) | 4:27.4 | Netherlands (NED) | 4:29.1 |

Legend: CR – Championship record; CWR – Commonwealth record; NR – National record

== Medal table ==
| Rank | Nation | Gold | Silver | Bronze | Total |
|---|---|---|---|---|---|
| 1 | United States (USA) | 14 | 11 | 11 | 36 |
| 2 | Soviet Union (URS) | 4 | 8 | 3 | 15 |
| 3 | Czechoslovakia (TCH) | 2 | 0 | 2 | 4 |
| 4 | Romania (ROU) | 2 | 0 | 0 | 2 |
| 5 | Netherlands (NED) | 1 | 2 | 3 | 6 |
| 6 | Brazil (BRA) | 1 | 2 | 0 | 3 |
| 7 | Australia (AUS) | 1 | 0 | 1 | 2 |
| 7 | Italy (ITA) | 1 | 0 | 1 | 2 |
| 9 | Great Britain (GBR) | 0 | 2 | 0 | 2 |
| 10 | West Germany (FRG) | 0 | 1 | 1 | 2 |
| 11 | Poland (POL) | 0 | 0 | 2 | 2 |
| 12 | Canada (CAN) | 0 | 0 | 1 | 1 |
| 12 | Japan (JPN) | 0 | 0 | 1 | 1 |
| Totals (13 entries) | | 26 | 26 | 26 | 78 |
