= Swimming at the 1977 Summer Universiade =

Swimming at the IX Summer Universiade

The swimming competition at the 1977 Summer Universiade took place in Sofia, Bulgaria.

== Medal table ==
Rank	Nation	Gold	Silver	Bronze	Total
1	United States	12	7	5	24
2	Canada	4	5	4	13
3	West Germany	2	2	4	8
4	Hungary	2	1	1	4
5	Soviet Union	1	6	5	12
6	Brazil	1	0	0	1
7	Great Britain	0	1	0	1
8	Italy	0	0	1	1
8	Poland	0	0	1	1
8	Romania	0	0	1	1
Totals (10 entries)		22	22	22	66

== Men's events ==
Event	Gold		Silver		Bronze	
100 m freestyle	John Ebuna; United States	52.05	Andy Coan; United States	52.12	Klaus Steinbach; West Germany	52.27
400 m freestyle	Dick Hannula Jr. United States	4:02.17	Vladimir Mikheyev; Soviet Union	4:03.78	Igor Kushpelev; Soviet Union	4:03.93
1500 m freestyle	John Weston; United States	15:46.94	Igor Kushpelev; Soviet Union	15:59.80	Kyle Ditzler; United States	16:10.87
100 m backstroke	Rômulo Arantes; Brazil	58.45	Jim Ballard; United States	58.75	Zoltán Verrasztó; Hungary	58.79
200 m backstroke	Zoltán Verrasztó; Hungary	2:05.60	Bruce Hardcastle; United States	2:06.52	Jim Ballard; United States	2:07.67
100 m breaststroke	Graham Smith; Canada	1:05.17	Duncan Goodhew; Great Britain	1:06.04	Giorgio Lalle; Italy	1:06.34
200 m breaststroke	Graham Smith; Canada	2:23.43	Vladimir Dementyev; Soviet Union	2:24.10	Aigars Kudis; Soviet Union	2:24.73
100 m butterfly	Mike Curington; United States	55.58	Dan Thompson; Canada	57.05	John van Buren; Canada	57.12
200 m butterfly	Michael Kraus; West Germany	2:02.81	Andrey Avtushenko; Soviet Union	2:03.73	Bruce Rogers; Canada	2:05.24
400 m individual medley	András Hargitay; Hungary	4:32.91	Zoltán Verrasztó; Hungary	4:34.19	Andy Ritchie; Canada	4:35.30
4×100 m freestyle relay	United States (USA); Andy Coan; Doug Lambert; Mike Curington; John Ebuna	3:31.49	West Germany (FRG)	3:31.75	Soviet Union (URS)	3:33.24
4×200 m freestyle relay	United States (USA); John Weston; Mike Curington; John Ebuna; Dick Hannula Jr.	7:41.20	Soviet Union (URS)	7:42.55	West Germany (FRG)	7:48.27
4×100 m medley relay	United States (USA); Jim Ballard; Lance Michaelis; Mike Curington; John Ebuna	3:51.67	Canada (CAN)	3:53.67	Soviet Union (URS)	3:54.34

Legend: CR – Championship record; CWR – Commonwealth record; NR – National record

== Women's events ==
Event	Gold		Silver		Bronze	
100 m freestyle	Jutta Weber; West Germany	57.80	Sue Hinderaker; United States	58.93	Beth Harrell; United States	59.05
400 m freestyle	Bonnie Glasgow; United States	4:16.50	Liz McKinnon; Canada	4:24.04	Wendy Weinberg; United States	4:27.75
100 m backstroke	Klavdiya Studenikova; Soviet Union	1:06.68	Meg McCully; United States	1:07.25	Yelena Rusanova; Soviet Union	1:08.54
100 m breaststroke	Marion Stuart; Canada	1:15.60	Amy Tasnady; United States	1:16.66	Anna Skolarczyk; Poland	1:16.83
200 m breaststroke	Anne Gagnon; Canada	2:43.7	Anne Merklinger; Canada	2:44.60	Amy Tasnady; United States	2:44.69
100 m butterfly	Sue Hinderaker; United States	1:03.63	Gudrun Beckmann; West Germany	1:03.84	Anca Miclaus; Romania	1:04.61
200 m individual medley	Bonnie Glasgow; United States	2:20.66	Jennie Franks; United States	2:23.82	Danielle Balla; Canada	2:27.22
4×100 m freestyle relay	United States (USA); Shawn Houghton; Bonny Brown; Beth Harrell; Sue Hinderaker	3:53.70	Canada (CAN)	4:01.02	West Germany (FRG)	4:03.23
4×100 m medley relay	United States (USA); Meg McCully; Amy Tasnady; Beth Harrell; Sue Hinderaker	4:29.78	Soviet Union (URS)	4:31.27	West Germany (FRG)	4:46.63

Legend: CR – Championship record; CWR – Commonwealth record; NR – National record
