= Denys Syzonenko =

Ukrainian swimmer (born 1984)

Personal information
- Full name: Denys Viktorovych Syzonenko
- National team: Ukraine
- Born: 13 April 1984 (age 42) Bila Tserkva, Ukrainian SSR, Soviet Union
- Height: 1.97 m (6 ft 6 in)
- Weight: 91 kg (201 lb)

Sport
- Sport: Swimming
- Strokes: Freestyle
- Club: Dynamo Kyiv
- Coach: Viktor Turchin
Medal record
Men's swimming
Representing Ukraine
Universiade
Gold medal – first place	2005 İzmir	4×100 m medley
Silver medal – second place	2003 Daegu	4×100 m freestyle

Denys Viktorovych Syzonenko (Ukrainian: Денис Вікторович Сизоненко; born 13 April 1984) is a Ukrainian former swimmer, who specialized in freestyle events. He is a single-time Olympian (2004), and a two-time relay medalist at the Universiade (2003 and 2005). He also trains for Dynamo Kyiv swimming team, under his longtime coach Viktor Turchin.

Syzonenko qualified only for the men's 4 × 100 m freestyle relay, as a member of the Ukrainian team, at the 2004 Summer Olympics in Athens. Teaming with Andriy Serdinov, Pavel Khnykin, and Yuriy Yegoshin in heat two, Syzonenko swam a lead-off leg and recorded a split of 50.05, but the Ukrainians missed the top 8 final by almost a full second, finishing in fifth place and tenth overall with a national record of 3:18.95.

At the 2005 Summer Universiade in İzmir, Turkey, Syzonenko helped out the Ukrainian team (Anton Buhayov, Oleg Lisogor, and Serhiy Advena) to upset their American rivals and claim the medley relay title in a final time of 3:38.49.
