= Irena Fleissnerová =

Czech swimmer (born 1958)

Personal information
- Full name: Irena Fleissnerová
- Nationality: Czech
- Born: 25 November 1958 (age 67) Plzeň, Czechoslovakia
- Height: 1.68 m (5 ft 6 in)
- Weight: 58 kg (128 lb)

Sport
- Sport: Swimming
- Strokes: Breaststroke
Medal record
Summer Universiade
Gold medal – first place	1979 Mexico City	100 m breaststroke
Gold medal – first place	1979 Mexico City	200 m breaststroke
Silver medal – second place	1981 Bucharest	200 m breaststroke
Bronze medal – third place	1979 Mexico City	400 m medley

Irena Fleissnerová (born 25 November 1958 in Plzeň) is a retired breaststroke swimmer from Czechoslovakia, who won two gold medals at the 1979 Summer Universiade in Mexico City, Mexico. She represented Czechoslovakia at the 1980 Summer Olympics in Moscow.
