= Andrea Righi =

Italian swimmer (born 1979)

Personal information
- Full name: Andrea Righi
- Nationality: Italy
- Born: 14 December 1979 (age 46)
- Height: 1.90 m (6 ft 3 in)
- Weight: 80 kg (176 lb)

Sport
- Sport: Swimming
- Strokes: Freestyle
- Club: CS Carabinieri; ASD Futura Nuoto Prato
Medal record
Summer Universiade
Gold medal – first place	1999 Mallorca	1500 m freestyle
Silver medal – second place	1999 Mallorca	400 m freestyle
Silver medal – second place	1999 Mallorca	800 m freestyle

Andrea Righi (born 14 December 1979) is a retired freestyle swimmer from Italy, who was a specialist in the long-distance events. He is best known for winning three medals at the 1999 Summer Universiade in Palma de Mallorca, Spain.
