= Andrea Rolla =

Italian swimmer (born 1983)

Personal information
- Born: 4 December 1983 (age 42)
Medal record
Men's swimming
Representing Italy
European Championships (SC)
Gold medal – first place	2011 Szczecin	4×50 m freestyle

Andrea Rolla (born 4 December 1983 in Piano di Sorrento, Naples, Italy) is an Italian swimmer. He competed for Italy at the 2012 Summer Olympics in the men's 4 x 100 m freestyle relay.
