= Sergey Rusin =

Soviet swimmer (born 1959)

Personal information
- Born: 31 October 1959 (age 66)
Medal record
Men's swimming
Representing Soviet Union
Olympic Games
Gold medal – first place	1980 Moscow	4×200 m freestyle
World Championships (LC)
Silver medal – second place	1978 Berlin	4×200 m freestyle
European Championships (LC)
Gold medal – first place	1977 Jönköping	400 m freestyle
Gold medal – first place	1977 Jönköping	4×200 m freestyle
Summer Universiade
Gold medal – first place	1979 Mexico City	400 m freestyle
Silver medal – second place	1979 Mexico City	200 m freestyle

Sergey Rusin (Russian: Сергей Русин; born 31 October 1959) is a former freestyle swimmer from the Soviet Union. He competed at the 1980 Summer Olympics in Moscow, USSR, and is best known for winning the gold medal in the men's 400 m freestyle at the 1977 European Championships in Sweden.
