= Bruce Rogers (didgeridoo) =

Bruce John Rogers (14 March 1964 – 18 July 2016) was an Australian didgeridoo maker, performer and teacher.

== Biography ==
Rogers was born in Queensland, Australia. He received his education from Melbourne High and studied there until 1981. He then attended RMIT University and graduated as a civil engineer in 1987.

After his graduation, he became interested in didgeridoo and started to work with didgeridoo players including Alan Dargin and Mark Atkins.

In 1997, he started annual tours to Europe and developed interest in didgeridoo internationally.

== Albums ==
- Cloudhands
