= Aigars Kudis =

Latvian swimmer (born 1959)

Personal information
- Nationality: Latvian
- Born: 30 December 1959 (age 66) Riga, Latvian SSR, Soviet Union

Sport
- Sport: Swimming
Medal record
Representing Soviet Union
Summer Universiade
Bronze medal – third place	1977 Sofia	200m breaststroke

Aigars Kudis (born 30 December 1959) is a Latvian former swimmer. He competed in the men's 200 metre breaststroke at the 1976 Summer Olympics for the Soviet Union.
