= Mauro Gallo =

Italian swimmer (born 1979)

Personal information
- Born: May 6, 1979 (age 47)

Sport
- Sport: Swimming
Medal record
Representing Italy
Summer Universiade
Silver medal – second place	1999 Palma de Mallorca	100m freestyle
Silver medal – second place	1999 Palma de Mallorca	4x100m freestyle relay
Mediterranean Games
Gold medal – first place	2001 Tunis	4x100m freestyle relay
Bronze medal – third place	2001 Tunis	100m freestyle

Mauro Gallo (born 6 May 1979) is an Italian former swimmer who competed in the 2000 Summer Olympics.
