= Burl Reid =

Australian swimmer

Personal information
- Born: August 31, 1978 (age 48) Launceston, Tasmania

Sport
- Sport: Swimming
Medal record
Representing Australia
Summer Universiade
Gold medal – first place	2001 Beijing	50m butterfly
Silver medal – second place	1999 Palma de Mallorca	100m butterfly

Burl Reid (born 31 August 1978) is an Australian butterfly swimmer.

== Personal life ==
Burl was born Anne & Denis Reid's second child in 1978. He studied and swam at Scotch Oakburn College 1992–1995. The family moved to Queensland from Launceston in 1996. He studied at Gold Coast Institute of TAFE Diploma of Building Design.

== Sport results ==
- 1997 Telstra Australian Open in 50m butterfly 25.41 in CQ Aquajets QLD squad
- 1998 Telstra Australian Short Course Championships in 200m butterfly 1.59.42
- 1999 Summer Universiade in Palma de Mallorca won a silver medal in 100m butterfly.
- 1999 U. S. Open in 100m butterfly 53.89
- 1999 AUS National Pan/Pacific Trials in 100m butterfly 53.92
- 2000 World Short Course Championships fourth place in 50m butterfly
- 2000 Australian Selection Trials in Sydney in 50m butterfly second place with 24.40
- 2001 Summer Universiade in Beijing won gold medal in 50m butterfly
- 2001 East Asian Games in 100m butterfly he clocked the fifth fastest time ever by an Australian and finished second in a personal best time 53.25. In 2010 Reid was inducted into the Australian University Sport Honour Roll
