= Lionel Poirot =

French swimmer (born 1973)

Personal information
- Born: September 8, 1973 (age 53) Châtenay-Malabry, France

Sport
- Sport: Swimming
Medal record
Representing France
Summer Universiade
Silver medal – second place	1999 Palma de Mallorca	200m freestyle
Mediterranean Games
Gold medal – first place	1991 Athens	4x100m freestyle relay
Silver medal – second place	1991 Athens	4x200m freestyle relay
European Championships
Bronze medal – third place	1993 Sheffield	4x200m freestyle relay

Lionel Poirot (French: [ljɔnɛl pwaʁo]; born 8 September 1973) is a French former freestyle swimmer who competed in the 1992 Summer Olympics and in the 1996 Summer Olympics.
