= Igor Kushpelev =

Georgian swimmer (born 1959)

Personal information
- Born: 10 August 1959 (age 66) Tbilisi, Soviet Union

Sport
- Sport: Swimming
Medal record
Representing Soviet Union
Summer Universiade
Silver medal – second place	1977 Sofia	1500m freestyle
Silver medal – second place	1979 Mexico City	1500m freestyle
Bronze medal – third place	1977 Sofia	400m freestyle

Igor Kushpelev (born 10 August 1959) is a Georgian former swimmer. He competed in the men's 1500 metre freestyle at the 1976 Summer Olympics for the Soviet Union.
