= Vladimir Dementyev =

Soviet swimmer

Personal information
- Born: 14 January 1957 (age 69) Lipetsk, Russian SFSR, Soviet Union
- Height: 1.96 m (6 ft 5 in)
- Weight: 91 kg (201 lb)

Sport
- Sport: Swimming
- Club: Spartak Lipetsk
Medal record
Representing Soviet Union
Universiade
Silver medal – second place	1977 Sofia	200 m breaststroke
Bronze medal – third place	1977 Sofia	4×100 m medley

Vladimir Vasilyevich Dementyev (Russian: Владимир Васильевич Дементьев; born 14 January 1957) is a Soviet breaststroke swimmer who won two medals at the 1977 Summer Universiade. He also competed at the 1976 Summer Olympics, but did not reach the finals.

In 1978, he graduated from the Lipetsk Institute of Pedagogy and until 1998 worked there as an assistant professor, section head and then dean of the Faculty of Sports. In 2007, he defended a PhD in pedagogy, and has about 60 publications in this field.

After retirement from senior swimming he competed in the masters category and won a silver medal at the world championships in 1992 and a bronze medal at the European championships in 1993, both in the 50 m breaststroke. In the same event he set seven world, European and national records and won all national titles in 1989–1990 (USSR) and 1992–2000 (Russia). Since 1992 he is the president of the Russian association of masters swimming, and since 1998 is a member of the Russian Olympic Committee. He is the head of the sports administration of the Lipetsk Oblast. In 2007 he was awarded the medal of the Medal of the Order "For Merit to the Fatherland" (II class).
