= Vladimir Mikheyev =

Russian swimmer

Personal information
- Born: 7 February 1957 (age 69) Moscow, Soviet Union

Sport
- Sport: Swimming
Medal record
Representing Soviet Union
Summer Universiade
Silver medal – second place	1977 Sofia	400m freestyle

Vladimir Mikheyev (born 7 February 1957) is a Russian former swimmer. He competed in two events at the 1976 Summer Olympics for the Soviet Union.
