= Mike Bottom =

American swimmer

Biographical details
- Born: c. 1956; Akron, Ohio, U.S.
- Education: University of Southern California

Playing career
- 1970–1975: Santa Clara Swim Club
- 1975–1977: U Southern California
- Positions: Butterfly, freestyle

Coaching career (HC unless noted)
- 1991–1994: Auburn, Asst. Coach
- 1994–1997: U Southern California, Asst. Coach
- 1998–2007: University California, Berkeley
- 2008–2012: University of Michigan, Men
- 2012–2023: University of Michigan, Men and Women
- 1996–2016: US Olympic team coach (6 times)

Head coaching record
- Overall: 111–13–1 (Michigan Men).895 Percentage; 74–19 (Michigan Women).795 Percentage

Accomplishments and honors

Championships
- At USC: Women's NCAA Championship 1997; At Michigan: Men's NCAA Championship 2013; 12 Big 10 titles, Men – 2009, 2011–16, 2020–21; Women – 2016–2018

Awards
- Big 10 Swimming Coach of the Year (2011–15, 2020); CSCAA 100 Greatest College Coaches
Medal record
Men's swimming
Representing the United States
Summer Universiade
Gold medal – first place	1979 Mexico City	100 m butterfly
Gold medal – first place	1979 Mexico City	4×100 m medley
Bronze medal – third place	1979 Mexico City	100 m backstroke

Mike Bottom (c. 1956) is an American former competitive swimmer at the University of Southern California, a member of the 1980 U.S. Olympic team, and the ninth head coach of the Michigan Wolverines swimming and diving program at the University of Michigan, serving from 2008 to 2023.

== Competitive swimming ==
Mike and his brother Joe swam for Northern California's renowned Santa Clara Swim Club under Hall of Fame Coach George Haines, and in College for the University of Southern California, under Hall of Fame Coach Peter Daland. At the Santa Clara Swim Club, Mike swam from the age of 14, and later played Water Polo for his Santa Clara High School Team. At USC, he was a five-time All-American and four-time USA National Team member. The swimming programs with which he competed and the coaches who trained him were considered exceptional in the swimming community.

== Olympic swimming ==
Competing in the trials for the 100-meter butterfly, Bottom qualified for the U.S. Olympic swimming team for the Moscow 1980 Olympics, but America boycotted the Olympic Games that year.

From 1980 to 1990, Bottom spent around 10 years outside of swimming, including positions with Pacific Bell in San Ramon, Calif., as a systems analyst (1984–90), and in San Francisco with Utah International, Inc., as an internal controls analyst (1982–84).

== Coaching career ==
Bottom served as assistant coach for the swimming team at Auburn University from 1991 until 1994, before serving as assistant coach for the University of Southern California swimming team until 1997. From 1998 until 2007, he was men's co-head coach for the University of California, Berkeley swimming team.

He was the personal coach for Gary Hall Jr., and later coached for The Race Club, the elite competitive swimming program in Islamorada, Florida, founded in 2003 by Hall and his father Gary Hall Sr. Bottom worked as a team coach in Vernier, Florida.

=== U of Michigan swim coach ===
In June 2008, it was announced that Bottom would take over from Bob Bowman as head coach of the University of Michigan's swimming team. His Michigan men's team finished as champions at the 2013 NCAA Division I Swimming and Diving Championships.

Bottom was particularly skilled in the careful study and development of freestyle swimming and was best known for creating top freestyle sprinters like Gary Hall and Anthony Ervin. He gave a ground-breaking lecture about the three styles of freestyle in 2007, which had a great impact on future swimmers and coaches. He often brought passion to his coaching lectures, and added excitement to his meets at halftime by sometimes adding dancers, musical performances, and such inventions as halftime underwater kicking races. Though his winning record was ebbing when he announced his retirement from Michigan at end of season in May 2023, his contributions to the sport of swimming remain evident.

==== Olympic coach ====
He served as an Olympic coach in some unofficial capacity for every Olympics from 1996 to 2012, though was not an official coach until 2016. He was also a two-time head coach of the American men's team at the World University Games (2013, 2015), and was an assistant at the 2009 and 2013 World Championships.

== Personal life ==
Bottom was born in Akron, Ohio.

He graduated from the University of Southern California in 1978 with a Bachelor's in Psychology. In 1993, he graduated summa cum laude with a Master's degree in counselling psychology from Auburn University. His college majors likely helped him find the most effective methods of motivating and counselling his many swimmers to achieve and thrive. To address Bottom's greatest coaching asset, Gary Hall said, "No coach, that I know of, has been as effective as Mike Bottom in tailoring approaches in coaching, sports psychology and motivation."

Bottom and his wife Lauralyn have three daughters (Micaiah, Dublyn, and Breana).
