= James Rauch =

James E. Rauch
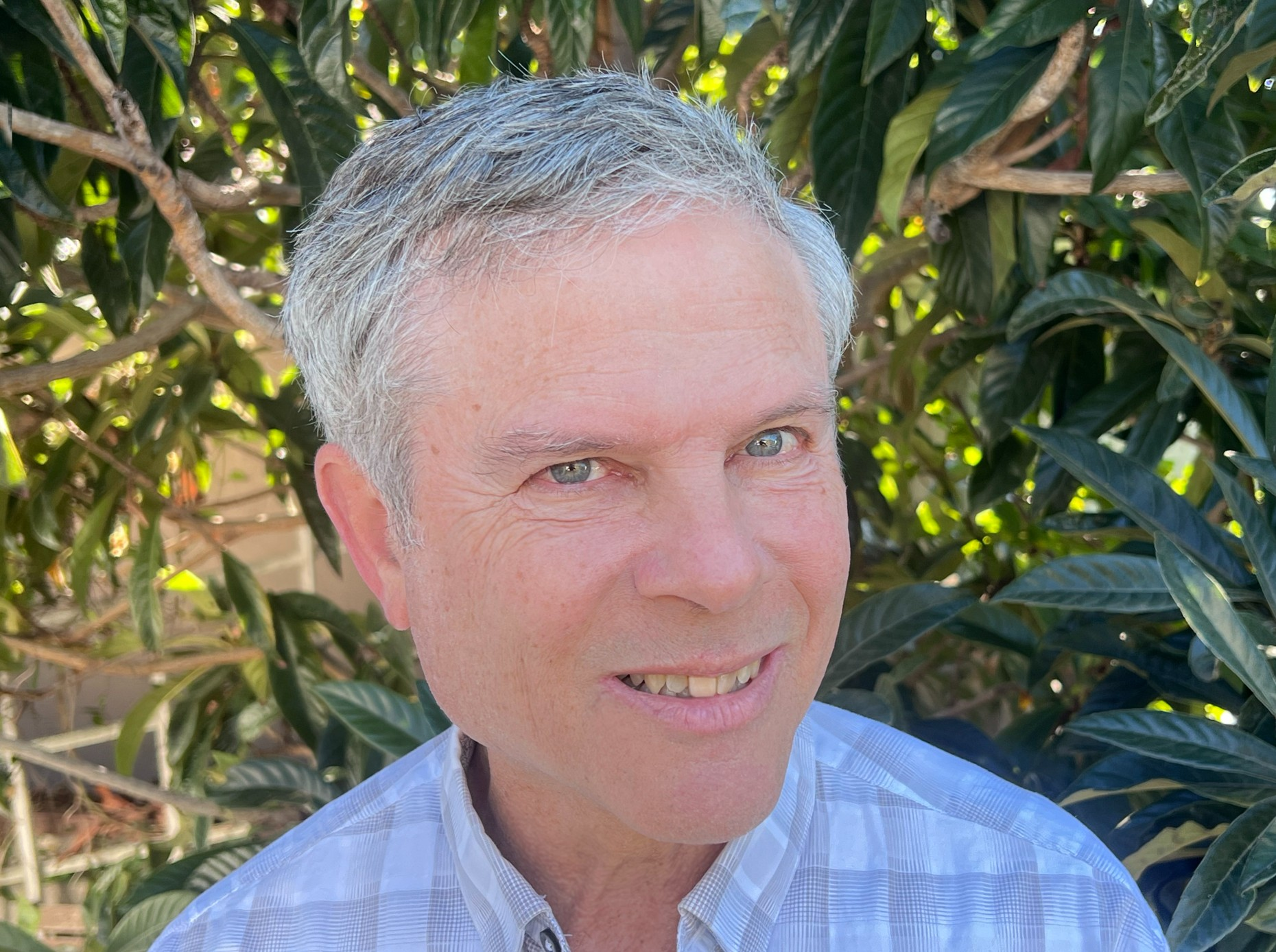
- Citizenship: United States
- Years active: 1985-2022

Academic background
- Education: Princeton University; Yale University
- Thesis: The Dynamic Interaction of Foreign Trade, Technology, and Capital with Economic Development: Three Essays (1985)
- Doctoral advisor: T. N. Srinivasan; Jonathan Eaton; Kenneth Kletzer

Academic work
- Discipline: International trade Economic growth Development economics Urban economics
- Institutions: University of California San Diego
- Awards: Guggenheim Fellowship (2012)
- Website: econweb.ucsd.edu/~jrauch

James E. Rauch is an American economist. He is a professor emeritus in the Department of Economics at the University of California, San Diego.

Rauch is most known for his research on international trade, economic growth, development economics, and urban economics. Among his authored works are his publications in academic journals, including the American Economic Review and the Quarterly Journal of Economics as well as books such as Networks and Markets and The Economics of the Middle East: A Comparative Approach.

Rauch has served as the co-editor for the Journal of International Economics in 2001–2010. He is a Research Associate at the National Bureau of Economic Research and a fellow at the CESifo Research Network.

== Education ==
Rauch completed a BA at Princeton University in 1980, followed at Yale University in economics by an MA in 1982 and a PhD in 1985.

== Career ==
Rauch joined the State University of New York at Stony Brook, where he was a visiting assistant professor in the Department of Economics from 1985 to 1986. Following this, he joined the University of California as an assistant professor in the Department of Economics, a role he held from 1986 to 1992. He was promoted to associate professor at the same department, serving from 1992 to 1998, before being elevated to professor in 1998, a position he held until 2022. Since 2022, he has been a professor emeritus in the Department of Economics at the University of California, San Diego.

Rauch served as chair of the Department of Economics at the University of California, San Diego from 2013 to 2016.

== Works ==
In 2001, Rauch edited Networks and Markets with Alessandra Casella, demonstrating that both economics and sociology offer valuable insights when studying markets and networks as parallel forms of exchange. Moreover, his 2007 book The Missing Links: Formation and Decay of Economic Networks provided an exploration of how economic networks form and evolve, integrating sociological and economic perspectives through theoretical models and case studies.

Rauch authored The Economics of the Middle East: A Comparative Approach in 2019, wherein he examined the distinct economic trajectories of Middle Eastern countries, comparing them to other regions and analyzing factors such as natural resources, geography, global interactions, and development policies, providing insights into their socioeconomic performance. A review published in the journal Insight Turkey stated "Rauch's book contributes to the literature on the Middle East's economics from a broad perspective. However, some tables, such as those related to migration, are not up to date, as more recent data is available. Also, some comparisons face the problem of being superficial because the Middle East countries cover a very large geography, making the gap between countries relatively high."

== Research ==
Rauch's research has encompassed policy analysis of economics in the Arab world, as well as other work in various areas, including empirical and theoretical investigations of bureaucratic structure, international trade, economic growth and development, and entrepreneurship.

=== Cities ===
Much of Rauch's research has focused on the geographical significance of cities in trade and economic development. In 1991, he authored a publication that linked international trade theory (comparative advantage) with economic geography, emphasizing the impact of transportation costs and geographic location on trade patterns, urban development, and regional economic disparities. In 1993, he investigated how developers can use discriminatory land pricing and other strategies to overcome the inertia caused by agglomeration economies and sunk costs, thereby encouraging industries to relocate from high-cost to low-cost sites. In the same year, he also investigated how higher average levels of human capital (measured by education and work experience) in U.S. metropolitan areas correlate with increased wages and land rents, supporting the idea that human capital acts as a local public good and positively impacts economic indicators. Moreover, investigating the impact of transitioning from political appointees to professional bureaucracy in U.S. city governments, his study revealed that the adoption of a Civil Service model increases the allocation of municipal expenditures to infrastructure projects and positively influences the growth rate of city manufacturing employment.

=== Bureaucracy ===
A major focus of Rauch's work is the evaluation of bureaucratic structure and its contribution to the overall economy. Examining the impact of bureaucratic characteristics through a "Weberianness Scale" on economic growth in developing countries from 1970 to 1990, his 1999 study revealed that state economic agencies with meritocratic recruitment and predictable long-term careers significantly enhance prospects for growth, suggesting the need for policymakers to prioritize building such bureaucracies. In related research, he explored the influence of structural elements like competitive salaries, internal promotion, career stability, and meritocratic recruitment on state bureaucracy performance in 35 less developed countries, revealing meritocratic recruitment as a significant factor, while the impact of competitive salaries, internal promotion, and career stability is inconclusive. Moreover, his 2001 work argued that establishing a professional government bureaucracy with internal promotion mechanisms reduces corruption, as internally promoted individuals prioritize imposing their preferences over collective goods, leading to less corruption among subordinates and lower levels of corruption overall.

=== Incomplete information and networks in international trade ===
Concentrating his research efforts on the subject of incomplete information and networks in international trade, his 1996 working paper proposed a network/search view of international trade in differentiated products. The study offered insights into the significance of ethnic and extended familial connections in trade, the effectiveness of diverse trading intermediaries such as Japan's sogo shosha, and the commonality of governmental export promotion strategies like subsidized trade missions. In related research, he argued that proximity and common language/colonial ties play a more significant role in matching buyers and sellers for differentiated products compared to those traded on organized exchanges, suggesting higher search barriers for differentiated products, and developed the "Rauch classification" of traded goods into organized exchange, reference priced, and differentiated. Moreover, his 2001 study examined transnational networks' impact on international trade efficiency, market dynamics, and future trends, proposing further exploration into intermediary roles and technology transfer potentials. While investigating how ethnic Chinese networks, measured by population shares, significantly enhance bilateral trade, particularly for differentiated products, his collaborative work with V Trindade highlighted their substantial role in connecting buyers and sellers beyond enforcing community sanctions in Southeast Asia. Furthermore, he investigated how incomplete information hinders efficient resource allocation and trade across countries, proposing that connections established via international information-sharing networks or relationships between parent and subsidiary companies can help overcome this challenge.

== Awards and honors ==
- 2012 – Guggenheim Fellow, John Simon Guggenheim Memorial Foundation

== Personal life ==
Rauch is married and has two sons. His wife, Doris Bittar, is an artist.

== Bibliography ==
=== Books ===
- Rauch, James E.; Casella, Alessandra (2001). Networks and Markets. Russell Sage Foundation. ISBN 9780871547002. JSTOR 10.7758/9781610444675.
- Rauch, James E. (2007). The Missing Links: Formation and Decay of Economic Networks. Russell Sage Foundation. ISBN 9780871547095. JSTOR 10.7758/9781610444668.
- Rauch, James E. (2019). The Economics of the Middle East: A Comparative Approach. Oxford University Press. ISBN 9780190879198.

=== Selected articles ===
- Rauch, James E. (1993). "Productivity Gains from Geographic Concentration of Human Capital: Evidence from the Cities" (PDF). Journal of Urban Economics. 34 (3): 380–400. doi:10.1006/juec.1993.1042.
- Rauch, James E. (1999). "Networks Versus Markets in International Trade". Journal of International Economics. 48 (1): 7–35. doi:10.1016/S0022-1996(98)00009-9.
- Evans, Peter B.; Rauch, James E. (1999). "Bureaucracy and Growth: A Cross-National Analysis of the Effects of 'Weberian' State Structures on Economic Growth". American Sociological Review. 64 (5): 748–765. doi:10.1177/000312249906400508.
- Rauch, James E.; Evans, Peter B. (2000). "Bureaucratic Structure and Bureaucratic Performance in Less Developed Countries". Journal of Public Economics. 75 (1): 49–71. doi:10.1016/S0047-2727(99)00044-4.
- Rauch, James E.; Trindade, Vitor (2002). "Ethnic Chinese Networks in International Trade". Review of Economics and Statistics. 84 (1): 116–130. doi:10.1162/003465302317331955.
