= Andy Ritchie (swimmer) =

Canadian swimmer (born 1958)

Personal information
- Full name: Andrew James Allan Ritchie
- Nickname: "Andy"
- National team: Canada
- Born: December 6, 1958 (age 67) Thunder Bay, Ontario

Sport
- Sport: Swimming
- Strokes: Medley
- Club: Thunderbolts Swim Club
Medal record
Men's swimming
Representing Canada
Summer Universiade
Bronze medal – third place	1977 Sofia	400 m medley

Andrew James Allan Ritchie (born December 6, 1958) is a former swimmer who represented Canada at the 1976 Summer Olympics in Montreal, Quebec. Ritchie competed in the men's 400-metre individual medley, and finished in seventh place in the event final with a time of 4:27.89. He now coaches for his former club Thunder Bay Thunder Bolts.
