= Tommy Hannan =

American swimmer (born 1980)

Personal information
- Full name: Thomas G. Hannan
- Nickname: "Tommy"
- National team: United States
- Born: January 14, 1980 (age 46) Baltimore, Maryland, U.S.
- Occupations: Swim Coach; Business Manager
- Height: 6 ft 2 in (188 cm)
- Weight: 201 lb (91 kg)
- Spouse: Shanna Duggan

Sport
- Sport: Swimming
- Strokes: Butterfly, Individual Medley
- Club: McDonogh Eagles Swim Team; Baltimore, Maryland
- College team: University of Texas (2003)
- Coach: Scott Hutchison (Eagles); Eddie Reese (U. Texas)
Medal record
Men's swimming
Representing the United States
Olympic Games
Gold medal – first place	2000 Sydney	4x100 m medley
World University Games
Gold medal – first place	1999 Mallorca	200 m medley

Thomas G. Hannan (born January 14, 1980) is an American former competition swimmer and Olympian, who swam for the University of Texas through 2002, and won gold medals at the 1999 World University Games and the 2000 Sydney Olympics. Competitive in all four strokes as a high school swimmer, he would become best known swimming in individual medleys, freestyle relays, and swimming the butterfly leg in medley relays. At the 2003 Pan American Games he served as the team captain. He later worked as a swimming coach at the University of Washington and KING Aquatics and then as a management consultant, working for Bridgepoint Consulting beginning around 2016, where after 2020, he helped open offices as a director in Denver, Colorado and Austin, Texas.

== Early life ==
Hannan was born in greater Baltimore, Maryland on January 14, 1980, to Georgia and Thomas Hannan, grew up in Cantonsville, and attended Baltimore's Mount Saint Joseph High School. A balanced and multi-faceted athlete at seven, he enjoyed playing basketball, baseball, football and soccer. In high school, he focused on fewer sports, playing football as a quarterback and acting as a catcher for the summer team of the Edmondson Recreation Council.

== Early swimming ==
He graduated Mount Saint Joseph in the spring of 1998, and was a noteworthy student maintaining a 3.5 grade point average. He began swimming at the age of eight with the Hunting Hills Swim Club and after a break, began training with the Cantonsville YMCA starting at the age of 13, when he began to focus more on swimming as a primary sport. In high school, he swam for Mount Saint Joseph High, where he was coached by Greg McDivitt. With the St. Joseph Gaels, he was voted the team's Most Valuable Swimmer in his junior year in 1997 and went undefeated in individual events in the 1997–1998 seasons. Diverse in his mastery of strokes, Hannan held Mount Saint Joseph High school records in the 100 and 50-meter freestyle events, the 100 backstroke, the 100 butterfly, and the 200 Individual medley. Equally skilled as a freestyle swimmer, he held Maryland Interscholastic Athletic Association records in both the 100 and 50-meter freestyle events.

=== Eagles Swim Team ===
By 16, he began training in earnest with the McDonogh, Maryland Eagles Swim Team (EST), associated with the McDonogh School just northwest of Baltimore and founded in 1992 by Coach Scott Ward. At EST, he was primarily trained and managed by assistant coach Sean Hutchison, eventually training six days a week which included occasional weight and dryland training. Hutchison authored his intensive training regimen and noted that Hannan was one of the few swimmers on the team that could adapt as well to its physical demands. Eagles Head Coach Scott Ward also oversaw Hannan's training and progress. Competing in several strokes, Hannan swam the fastest time in the country of 58.22 in the 100 backstroke at the 1997 Summer Junior Nationals. In his high school senior year, he had a national age-group rating of 7th in the 100-backstroke with a time of 50.3, and was rated 8th in the 100 butterfly with a time of 49.80.

== University of Texas ==
Hannan attended the University of Texas at Austin on an athletic scholarship, beginning in the fall of 1998, where he was managed by Hall of Fame Coach Eddie Reese, and earned his way helping the Texas Longhorns swimming and diving team win three NCAA national team championships in 2000, 2001, and 2002. He was part of an NCAA champion 4×100-meter medley relay team, and a team that set a new American record in the 4×100-meter freestyle relay while winning the NCAA championship. He graduated Texas in 2003 with a major in Finance, and while swimming with the Longhorn's won varsity letters all four years and was twice a team captain as an upperclassman. In 2000, Hannan earned individual NCAA titles in the 400 Medley Relay, and in 2001 earned individual NCAA titles in the 4x100 medley and 4x100 freestyle relays. At Texas, he earned All-American honors seventeen times.

== 2000 Sydney Olympics ==
=== 2000 trials ===
At the 2000 Sydney Olympic trials in Indianapolis, though he had rarely competed in butterfly during his college years, Hannan swam the second fastest 100-meter butterfly time ever swum by an American swimmer to qualify for the 2000 U.S. Olympic team. His 100-meter butterfly finals time was an impressive 52.81, though he was eclipsed by backstroker Ian Crocker who had swum a 52.78, only .03 seconds faster than Tommy's time. Ian Crocker, who held the American record for the 100 butterfly would swim in the finals. He placed 28th in the 100-meter freestyle, did not make the finals for the 100 backstroke though he swam a 55.68.

=== 2000 Olympics ===
Hannan later won the gold medal as part of the American Men's 4x100 m medley where he swam the butterfly leg in the qualifying preliminaries of the Sydney Olympics. The American Medley Relay team composed of Lenny Krayzelburg, Ed Moses, Ian Crocker and Gary Hall Jr. later swam a combined time of 3:33.73 in the finals, though Hannan swam only in the preliminaries. In a close finish, the Australian team took the silver with a time of 3:35.27, and the German team took the bronze with a time of 3:35.88.

Hannan also swam in the 100-meter butterfly event, placing fourteenth, with a time of 53.59 overall, and did not make the finals, though his overall time was only 1.37 seconds from bronze medal contention. As many as seven of his teammates from the University of Texas swim team were part of the American Olympic Swimming team at the 2000 Sydney Olympics, and his Texas Coach Eddie Reese was in attendance.

=== Honors ===
Hannan was a 1997 and 1998 Baltimore Sun Athlete of the Year. He became a member of the Maryland Swimming Hall of Fame in September 2011, and was a Speedo High School Swimmer of the Year in 1998. He was later made a member of the Mount St. Joseph High School Athletic Hall of Fame in 2004.

== Post-swimming careers ==
Hannan decided to end his swimming career after a disappointing performance at the 2004 Olympic trials. He helped fill book orders for a period at the University of Texas and then served briefly as a financial consultant.

=== University of Washington ===
Beginning in the 2006-7 season, Hannan moved to Seattle, Washington, and served as the assistant swimming coach for the Washington Huskies at the University of Washington for three seasons, where he was also in charge of the recruiting effort, leaving around 2009 when the University began cutting funding to the swim program. In the summer of 2009, he coached Washington's Brewster Bearacuda's Swim team, with Brewster about sixty miles east of Seattle. Hannan's wife Shanna left her position as a gymnastics coach around 2011 shortly before Tommy left to look for other opportunities.

==== Marriage ====
In 2009, Hannan married Shanna Duggan, while she was coaching gymnastics at the University of Washington, having begun coaching in 2005. Duggan was a 2005 Communications and Sports Management graduate of the University of Michigan, having formerly attended Central Michigan University for three years. At the University of Michigan, she was an Academic All American and a second team All American Big Ten Selection in Gymnastics. She coached gymnastics at the University of Washington from 2006-2011, while Hannan was a swim coach there. The couple had a daughter in 2017.

=== KING Aquatic Club ===
Beginning around 2010, while residing in Seattle, Washington, he coached Seattle's National groups for KING Aquatic Club, where his former coach at Baltimore's Eagle Swim Team, Scott Hutchison, served as a Head Coach. In 2013, Hannan resigned as KING Aquatic Club coach with the initial intent of returning to school or returning to the corporate world. He considered taking courses towards a master's in business administration.

He worked as a consultant in the oil and gas industry, and then around 2016, took a position with the Bridgepoint Consulting Group utilizing his background in business development and his degree in Finance. He worked with Bridgepoint Consulting helping to grow the Denver office in 2020 and began as a director of business development at the Austin office in 2023.

== See also ==
- List of Olympic medalists in swimming (men)
- List of University of Texas at Austin alumni
