= Giorgio Lalle =

Italian swimmer (born 1957)

Personal information
- Full name: Giorgio Lalle
- Nationality: Italian
- Born: 4 March 1957 (age 69)

Sport
- Sport: Swimming
- Strokes: Breaststroke
Medal record
European Championships (LC)
Silver medal – second place	1977 Jönköping	100 m breaststroke
Mediterranean Games
Gold medal – first place	1975 Algiers	100 m breaststroke
Summer Universiade
Bronze medal – third place	1977 Sofia	100 m breaststroke

Giorgio Lalle (born 4 March 1957) is a retired breaststroke swimmer from Italy, who represented his native country at the 1976 Summer Olympics in Montreal, Quebec, Canada. He claimed the gold medal a year earlier at the 1975 Mediterranean Games in the men's 100 m breaststroke event.
