= Michael Kraus (swimmer) =

German former swimmer

Personal information
- Full name: Michael Kraus
- Nationality: West German
- Born: September 26, 1955 (age 70) Gladbeck, West Germany

Sport
- Sport: Swimming
- Strokes: Butterfly
Medal record
Men's swimming
Representing West Germany
Olympic Games
Bronze medal – third place	1976 Montreal	4x100 m medley
European Championships
Gold medal – first place	1977 Jönköping	200 m butterfly
Gold medal – first place	1977 Jönköping	4x100 m medley
Summer Universiade
Gold medal – first place	1977 Sofia	200 m butterfly
Silver medal – second place	1979 Mexico City	200 m butterfly

Michael Kraus (born 26 September 1955 in Gladbeck) is a German former swimmer who competed in the 1976 Summer Olympics.
