= Mikhail Gorelik =

Russian swimmer

Personal information
- Full name: Mikhail Vladimirovich Gorelik
- Nationality: Russian
- Born: March 21, 1958 (age 68) Leningrad, Soviet Union
- Height: 1.79 m (5 ft 10 in)
- Weight: 72 kg (159 lb)

Sport
- Sport: Swimming
- Strokes: Butterfly, Medley
Medal record
Men's swimming
Representing the Soviet Union
Summer Universiade
Gold medal – first place	1979 Mexico City	200 m butterfly

Mikhail Gorelik (born 21 March 1958) is a Soviet former swimmer who competed in the 1976 Summer Olympics and in the 1980 Summer Olympics.
