= Tateki Shinya =

Japanese swimmer

Personal information
- Born: 7 January 1958 (age 68) Hiroshima, Japan

Sport
- Sport: Swimming
Medal record
Representing Japan
Summer Universiade
| Bronze medal – third place | 1979 Mexico City | 200m butterfly |

Tateki Shinya (新屋 干城, Shin'ya Tateki; born 7 January 1958) is a Japanese former swimmer. He competed in two events at the 1976 Summer Olympics.
