= Akira Hayashi (swimmer) =

Japanese swimmer (born 1974)

Personal information
- Full name: Akira Hayashi
- Nationality: Japan
- Born: September 16, 1974 (age 51) Miyazaki
- Height: 1.71 m (5 ft 7 in)
- Weight: 72 kg (159 lb)

Sport
- Sport: Swimming
- Strokes: Breaststroke
- Club: Akeno Swimming Pool
Medal record
Men's swimming
Pan Pacific Championships
Gold medal – first place	1995 Atlanta	200m Breaststroke
Silver medal – second place	1993 Kobe	100m Breaststroke
Bronze medal – third place	1991 Edmonton	100m Breaststroke
Bronze medal – third place	1993 Kobe	4x100m medley
Bronze medal – third place	1995 Atlanta	4x100m medley
Asian Games
Gold medal – first place	1994 Hiroshima	100 m breaststroke
Gold medal – first place	1994 Hiroshima	4x100 m medley
Silver medal – second place	1994 Hiroshima	200 m breaststroke
Silver medal – second place	1998 Bangkok	100 m breaststroke
Summer Universiade
Gold medal – first place	1995 Fukuoka	100m Breaststroke
Silver medal – second place	1993 Buffalo	100m Breaststroke
Silver medal – second place	1999 Palma	100m Breaststroke
Bronze medal – third place	1993 Buffalo	200m Breaststroke
Bronze medal – third place	1995 Fukuoka	200m Breaststroke

Akira Hayashi (林 享, Hayashi Akira) (born September 16, 1974) is a retired Japanese male breaststroke swimmer. He represented Japan at three consecutive Summer Olympics, starting in 1992. He is best known for winning a five medals in the 1990s at the Summer Universiade.
