= Yuriy Yegoshin =

Ukrainian swimmer (born 1985)

Personal information
- Born: June 2, 1985 (age 41)

Sport
- Sport: Swimming
Medal record
Representing Ukraine
Summer Universiade
Gold medal – first place	2003 Daegu	4x100m medley relay
Silver medal – second place	2003 Daegu	4x100m freestyle relay
Bronze medal – third place	2003 Daegu	100m freestyle
Bronze medal – third place	2007 Bangkok	4x100m medley relay
European Championships
Gold medal – first place	2004 Madrid	4x100m medley relay
Silver medal – second place	2006 Budapest	4x100m medley relay

Yuriy Yegoshyn (born 2 June 1985) is a Ukrainian swimmer who competed in the 2004 Summer Olympics and in the 2008 Summer Olympics.
