= Bruce Rogers (swimmer) =

Canadian swimmer

Personal information
- Born: 4 June 1957 (age 69) Toronto, Ontario, Canada

Sport
- Sport: Swimming
Medal record
Representing Canada
Summer Universiade
Bronze medal – third place	1977 Sofia	200m butterfly

Bruce Rogers (born 4 June 1957) is a Canadian former swimmer. He competed in the men's 200 metre butterfly at the 1976 Summer Olympics.
