= Matthew Pierce =

American entrepreneur

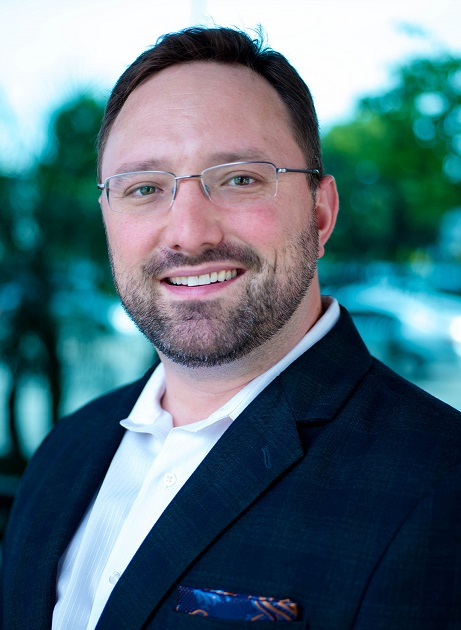
- Pierce for O Labs
- Born: December 3, 1977 (age 48); Denver, Colorado
- Education: Stanford University (B.A.); UCLA Anderson (M.B.A.)
- Occupations: Co-founder & CEO, O Labs
- Spouse: Magdalena Sandoval

Matthew Pierce (born December 3, 1977) is an entrepreneur, university lecturer, and game designer. He is a former NCAA Champion and was a member of the United States Men's National Swim Team.

== Early life ==
Matthew Pierce attended Stanford University, where he was a member of the men's swimming and diving team. The team won the NCAA Championship in 1998. Pierce was an All-American, an NCAA Champion in the 200-yard butterfly and a gold medalist at the World University Games for USA Swimming.

== Career ==
After graduating from Stanford, Pierce co-founded Rosum Corporation which was later acquired by TruePosition. He then moved to Los Angeles, received his MBA at UCLA Anderson and became VP of Strategy at Originate.

Matthew now serves as co-founder and CEO of O Labs, a joint venture between Originate, Manatt, Phelps & Phillips, and ICM Partners. O Labs incubates and operates early-stage portfolio companies that attempt to address the needs of large enterprises. Pierce is a regular contributor to Southern California's Silicon Beach and the Los Angeles startup community.

Pierce is a lecturer at the UCLA Anderson School of Management and a visiting scholar in UCLA’s Economics Department, where he teaches entrepreneurship.

Pierce is also a game designer, serving as founder and chief creative officer of Robot Dinosaur Games. He created the game Scenarium and co-founded Versus, a real-money video game tournament platform backed by O Labs.
