= Zoltán Verrasztó =

Hungarian swimmer

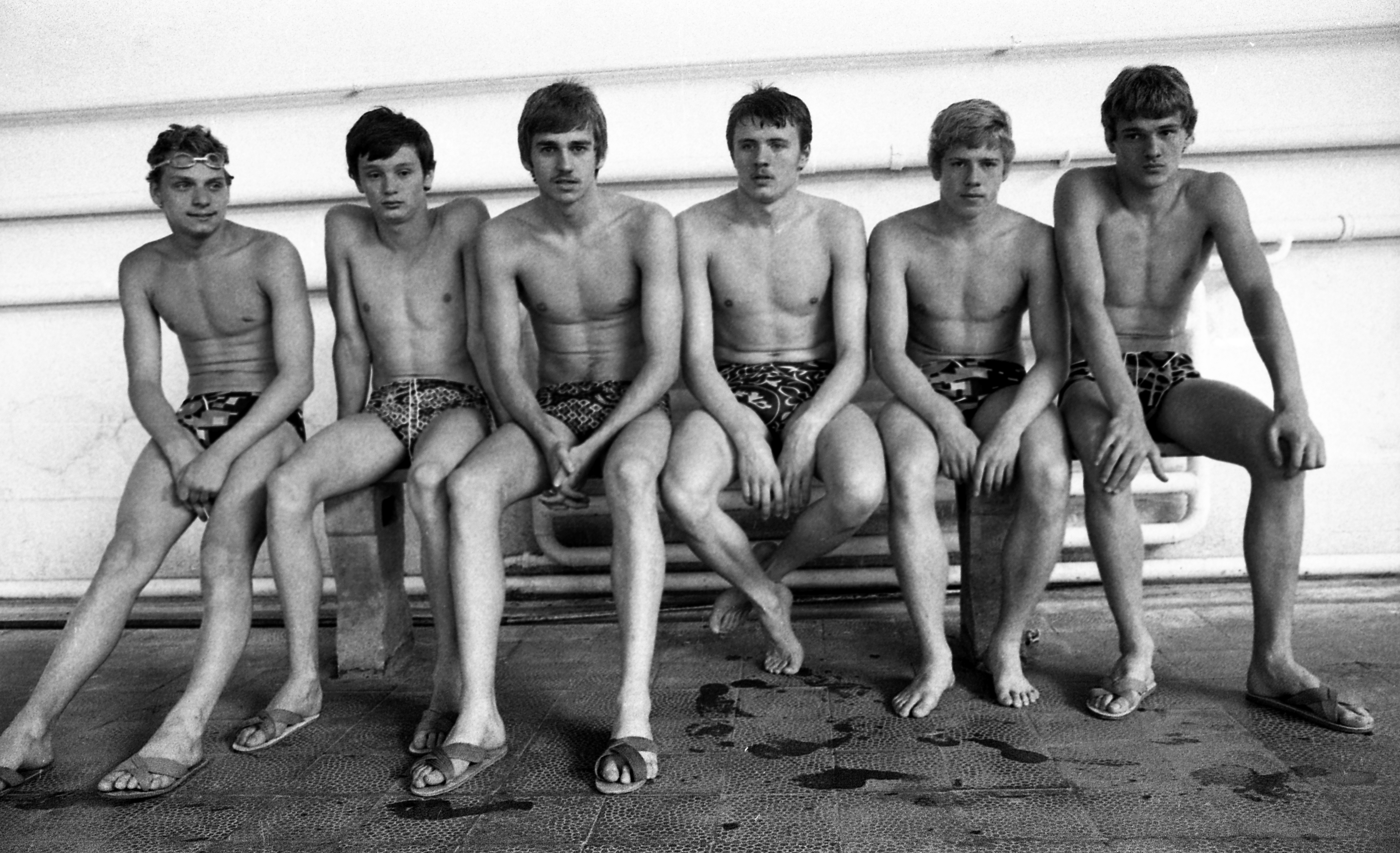
- Verrasztó Zoltán portrait

Personal information
- Full name: Verrasztó Zoltán
- Nationality: Hungarian
- Born: 15 March 1956 (age 70) Budapest, Hungarian People's Republic
- Height: 1.76 m (5 ft 9 in)
- Weight: 60 kg (132 lb)

Sport
- Sport: Swimming
- Strokes: backstroke, Individual medley
- Club: Központi Sportiskola; Budapesti Honvéd Sportegyesület
Medal record
Men's swimming
Representing Hungary
Olympic Games
Silver medal – second place	1980 Moscow	200 m backstroke
Bronze medal – third place	1980 Moscow	400 m medley
World Championships (LC)
Gold medal – first place	1975 Cali	200 m backstroke
Silver medal – second place	1973 Belgrade	200 m backstroke
Bronze medal – third place	1978 Berlin	200 m backstroke
European Championships (LC)
Gold medal – first place	1977 Jönköping	200 m backstroke
Silver medal – second place	1974 Vienna	200 m backstroke
Silver medal – second place	1977 Jönköping	100 m backstroke
Bronze medal – third place	1974 Vienna	100 m backstroke
Summer Universiade
Gold medal – first place	1977 Sofia	200 m backstroke
Silver medal – second place	1977 Sofia	400 m medley
Bronze medal – third place	1977 Sofia	100 m backstroke
European Junior Championships (LC)
Silver medal – second place	1971 Rotterdam	200 m medley

Zoltán Verrasztó (born 15 March 1956) is a former backstroke and medley swimmer from Hungary.

He won two medals at the 1980 Summer Olympics in Moscow, Soviet Union. Verrasztó claimed silver in the men's 200 m backstroke, and bronze in the men's 400 m individual medley. Apart from that he twice became world champion in the 200 m backstroke during the 1970s.

His children, Evelyn Verrasztó and Dávid Verrasztó are also Olympic swimmers. He coached them to become European championship gold medalists.

Records
Preceded by (Hungary) András Hargitay	Men's 400 metre individual medley world record holder (long course); 2 April 1976 – 25 July 1976	Succeeded by (United States) Rod Strachan
