= List of European Short Course Swimming Championships medalists (women) =

This is the complete list of women's European Short Course Swimming Championships medalists in swimming from 1991 to 2025. From 1991 to 1994 this event was held as the European Sprint Swimming Championships, where only the 50 meter events, the 100 meter individual medley, and both women's 4 × 50 meter relays were contested.

== Current program ==
=== 50 m freestyle ===
Year	Gold	Silver	Bronze
1991 Gelsenkirchen	Simone Osygus (GER)	Daniela Hunger (GER)	Louise Karlsson (SWE)
1992 Espoo	Franziska van Almsick (GER)	Simone Osygus (GER)	Annette Hadding (GER)
1993 Gateshead	Sandra Völker (GER)	Linda Olofsson (SWE)	Annette Hadding (GER)
1994 Stavanger	Sandra Völker (GER)	Angela Postma (NED)	Sue Rolph (GBR)
1996 Rostock	Sandra Völker (GER)	Sue Rolph (GBR)	Vibeke Johansen (NOR)
1998 Sheffield	Inge de Bruijn (NED)	Katrin Meissner (GER)	Sue Rolph (GBR)
1999 Lisbon	Therese Alshammar (SWE)	Anna-Karin Kammerling (SWE)	none awarded
1999 Lisbon	Therese Alshammar (SWE)	Sue Rolph (GBR)	none awarded
2000 Valencia	Therese Alshammar (SWE)	Alison Sheppard (GBR)	Anna-Karin Kammerling (SWE)
2001 Antwerp	Inge de Bruijn (NED)	Therese Alshammar (SWE)	Johanna Sjöberg (SWE)
2002 Riesa	Alison Sheppard (GBR)	Aleksandra Gerasimenya (BLR)	Anna-Karin Kammerling (SWE)
2003 Dublin	Marleen Veldhuis (NED)	Alison Sheppard (GBR)	Malia Metella (FRA)
2004 Vienna	Marleen Veldhuis (NED)	Anna-Karin Kammerling (SWE)	Hinkelien Schreuder (NED)
2005 Trieste	Marleen Veldhuis (NED)	Cristina Chiuso (ITA)	Anna-Karin Kammerling (SWE)
2006 Helsinki	Marleen Veldhuis (NED)	Therese Alshammar (SWE)	Hanna-Maria Seppälä (FIN)
2007 Debrecen	Marleen Veldhuis (NED)	Britta Steffen (GER)	Hinkelien Schreuder (NED)
2008 Rijeka	Marleen Veldhuis (NED)	Hinkelien Schreuder (NED)	Jeanette Ottesen (DEN)
2009 Istanbul	Hinkelien Schreuder (NED)	Ranomi Kromowidjojo (NED)	Dorothea Brandt (GER)
2010 Eindhoven	Ranomi Kromowidjojo (NED)	Hinkelien Schreuder (NED)	Britta Steffen (GER)
2011 Szczecin	Britta Steffen (GER)	Jeanette Ottesen (DEN)	Triin Aljand (EST)
2012 Chartres	Aleksandra Gerasimenya (BLR)	Triin Aljand (EST)	Jeanette Ottesen (DEN)
2013 Herning	Ranomi Kromowidjojo (NED)	Sarah Sjöström (SWE)	Aleksandra Gerasimenya (BLR)
2015 Netanya	Ranomi Kromowidjojo (NED)	Sarah Sjöström (SWE)	Jeanette Ottesen (DEN)
2017 Copenhagen	Sarah Sjöström (SWE)	Ranomi Kromowidjojo (NED)	Pernille Blume (DEN)
2019 Glasgow	Maria Kameneva (RUS)	Mélanie Henique (FRA)	Pernille Blume (DEN)
2021 Kazan	Sarah Sjöström (SWE)	Katarzyna Wasick (POL)	Maria Kameneva (RUS)
2023 Otopeni	Michelle Coleman (SWE)	Béryl Gastaldello (FRA)	Julie Kepp Jensen (DEN)
2025 Lublin	Katarzyna Wasick (POL)	Beryl Gastaldello (FRA) Sara Curtis (ITA)	not awarded

=== 100 m freestyle ===
Year	Gold	Silver	Bronze
1996 Rostock	Sandra Völker (GER)	Sue Rolph (GBR)	Martina Moravcová (SVK)
1998 Sheffield	Sue Rolph (GBR)	Martina Moravcová (SVK)	Louise Jöhncke (SWE)
1999 Lisbon	Therese Alshammar (SWE)	Sue Rolph (GBR)	Sandra Völker (GER)
2000 Valencia	Therese Alshammar (SWE)	Johanna Sjöberg (SWE)	Martina Moravcová (SVK)
2001 Antwerp	Inge de Bruijn (NED)	Martina Moravcová (SVK)	Johanna Sjöberg (SWE)
2002 Riesa	Alena Popchanka (BLR)	none awarded	Petra Dallmann (GER)
2002 Riesa	Martina Moravcová (SVK)	none awarded	Petra Dallmann (GER)
2003 Dublin	Malia Metella (FRA)	Marleen Veldhuis (NED)	Hanna-Maria Seppälä (FIN)
2004 Vienna	Malia Metella (FRA)	Marleen Veldhuis (NED)	Josefin Lillhage (SWE)
2005 Trieste	Marleen Veldhuis (NED)	Hanna-Maria Seppälä (FIN)	Petra Dallmann (GER)
2005 Trieste	Marleen Veldhuis (NED)	Hanna-Maria Seppälä (FIN)	Alena Popchanka (FRA)
2006 Helsinki	Marleen Veldhuis (NED)	Alena Popchanka (FRA)	Josefin Lillhage (SWE)
2007 Debrecen	Britta Steffen (GER)	Marleen Veldhuis (NED)	Josefin Lillhage (SWE)
2008 Rijeka	Marleen Veldhuis (NED)	Jeanette Ottesen (DEN)	Ranomi Kromowidjojo (NED)
2009 Istanbul	Inge Dekker (NED)	Ranomi Kromowidjojo (NED)	Jeanette Ottesen (DEN)
2010 Eindhoven	Ranomi Kromowidjojo (NED)	Femke Heemskerk (NED)	Britta Steffen (GER)
2011 Szczecin	Britta Steffen (GER)	Jeanette Ottesen (DEN)	Amy Smith (GBR)
2012 Chartres	Veronika Popova (RUS)	Jeanette Ottesen (DEN)	Charlotte Bonnet (FRA)
2013 Herning	Ranomi Kromowidjojo (NED)	Sarah Sjöström (SWE)	Aleksandra Gerasimenya (BLR)
2015 Netanya	Sarah Sjöström (SWE)	Ranomi Kromowidjojo (NED)	Veronika Popova (RUS)
2017 Copenhagen	Ranomi Kromowidjojo (NED)	Sarah Sjöström (SWE)	Pernille Blume (DEN)
2019 Glasgow	Freya Anderson (GBR)	Béryl Gastaldello (FRA)	Femke Heemskerk (NED)
2021 Kazan	Sarah Sjöström (SWE)	Katarzyna Wasick (POL)	Marrit Steenbergen (NED)
2023 Otopeni	Béryl Gastaldello (FRA)	Anna Hopkin (GBR)	Freya Anderson (GBR)
2025 Lublin	Marrit Steenbergen (NED)	Beryl Gastaldello (FRA)	Sara Curtis (ITA)

=== 200 m freestyle ===
Year	Gold	Silver	Bronze
1996 Rostock	Martina Moravcová (SVK)	Antje Buschschulte (GER)	Carla Geurts (NED)
1998 Sheffield	Martina Moravcová (SVK)	Franziska van Almsick (GER)	Louise Jöhncke (SWE)
1999 Lisbon	Martina Moravcová (SVK)	Josefin Lillhage (SWE)	Natalya Baranovskaya (BLR)
2000 Valencia	Martina Moravcová (SVK)	Karen Pickering (GBR)	Karen Legg (GBR)
2001 Antwerp	Martina Moravcová (SVK)	Solenne Figuès (FRA)	Alessa Ries (GER)
2002 Riesa	Alena Popchanka (BLR)	Solenne Figuès (FRA)	Josefin Lillhage (SWE)
2003 Dublin	Melanie Marshall (GBR)	Josefin Lillhage (SWE)	Alena Popchanka (BLR)
2004 Vienna	Josefin Lillhage (SWE)	Melanie Marshall (GBR)	Petra Dallmann (GER)
2005 Trieste	Josefin Lillhage (SWE)	none awarded	Paulina Barzycka (POL)
2005 Trieste	Federica Pellegrini (ITA)	none awarded	Paulina Barzycka (POL)
2006 Helsinki	Alena Popchanka (FRA)	Otylia Jędrzejczak (POL)	Josefin Lillhage (SWE)
2007 Debrecen	Josefin Lillhage (SWE)	Laure Manaudou (FRA)	Coralie Balmy (FRA)
2008 Rijeka	Federica Pellegrini (ITA)	Femke Heemskerk (NED)	Daria Belyakina (RUS)
2009 Istanbul	Federica Pellegrini (ITA)	Evelyn Verrasztó (HUN)	Femke Heemskerk (NED)
2010 Eindhoven	Femke Heemskerk (NED)	Silke Lippok (GER)	Evelyn Verrasztó (HUN)
2011 Szczecin	Silke Lippok (GER)	Melanie Costa (ESP)	Evelyn Verrasztó (HUN)
2012 Chartres	Camille Muffat (FRA)	Charlotte Bonnet (FRA)	Veronika Popova (RUS)
2013 Herning	Federica Pellegrini (ITA)	Charlotte Bonnet (FRA)	Veronika Popova (RUS)
2015 Netanya	Federica Pellegrini (ITA)	Veronika Popova (RUS)	Femke Heemskerk (NED)
2017 Copenhagen	Charlotte Bonnet (FRA)	Femke Heemskerk (NED)	Veronika Andrusenko (RUS)
2019 Glasgow	Freya Anderson (GBR)	Federica Pellegrini (ITA)	Femke Heemskerk (NED)
2021 Kazan	Marrit Steenbergen (NED)	Barbora Seemanová (CZE)	Katja Fain (SLO)
2023 Otopeni	Freya Anderson (GBR)	Barbora Seemanová (CZE)	Freya Colbert (GBR)
2025 Lublin	Marrit Steenbergen (NED)	Minna Ábrahám (HUN)	Freya Colbert (GBR)

=== 400 m freestyle ===
Year	Gold	Silver	Bronze
1996 Rostock	Kristýna Kyněrová (CZE)	Carla Geurts (NED)	Chantal Strasser (SUI)
1998 Sheffield	Carla Geurts (NED)	Vicki Horner (GBR)	Karen Legg (GBR)
1999 Lisbon	Yana Klochkova (UKR)	Natalya Baranovskaya (BLR)	Silvia Szalai (GER)
2000 Valencia	Irina Ufimtseva (RUS)	Jana Pechanová (CZE)	Rebecca Cooke (GBR)
2001 Antwerp	Anja Čarman (SLO)	Yana Klochkova (UKR)	Irina Ufimtseva (RUS)
2002 Riesa	Éva Risztov (HUN)	Yana Klochkova (UKR)	Hannah Stockbauer (GER)
2003 Dublin	Joanne Jackson (GBR)	Rebecca Cooke (GBR)	Melissa Caballero (ESP)
2003 Dublin	Joanne Jackson (GBR)	Rebecca Cooke (GBR)	Regina Sytch (RUS)
2004 Vienna	Keri-Anne Payne (GBR)	Daria Parchina (RUS)	Erika Villaecija (ESP)
2005 Trieste	Laure Manaudou (FRA)	Joanne Jackson (GBR)	Federica Pellegrini (ITA)
2006 Helsinki	Laure Manaudou (FRA)	Federica Pellegrini (ITA)	Joanne Jackson (GBR)
2007 Debrecen	Laure Manaudou (FRA)	Federica Pellegrini (ITA)	Ágnes Mutina (HUN)
2008 Rijeka	Coralie Balmy (FRA)	Camille Muffat (FRA)	Alessia Filippi (ITA)
2009 Istanbul	Coralie Balmy (FRA)	Lotte Friis (DEN)	Ophelie Cyrielle Etienne (FRA)
2010 Eindhoven	Ágnes Mutina (HUN)	Melanie Costa (ESP)	Gráinne Murphy (IRL)
2011 Szczecin	Mireia Belmonte (ESP)	Lotte Friis (DEN)	Melanie Costa (ESP)
2012 Chartres	Camille Muffat (FRA)	Lotte Friis (DEN)	Coralie Balmy (FRA)
2013 Herning	Mireia Belmonte (ESP)	Lotte Friis (DEN)	Federica Pellegrini (ITA)
2015 Netanya	Jazmin Carlin (GBR)	Katinka Hosszú (HUN)	Boglárka Kapás (HUN)
2017 Copenhagen	Boglárka Kapás (HUN)	Sarah Köhler (GER)	Julia Hassler (LIE)
2019 Glasgow	Simona Quadarella (ITA)	Isabel Marie Gose (GER)	Ajna Késely (HUN)
2021 Kazan	Anastasiya Kirpichnikova (RUS)	Anna Egorova (RUS)	Isabel Marie Gose (GER)
2023 Otopeni	Simona Quadarella (ITA)	Anastasiya Kirpichnikova (FRA)	Valentine Dumont (BEL)
2025 Lublin	Isabel Gose (GER)	Simona Quadarella (ITA)	Freya Colbert (GBR)

=== 800 m freestyle ===
Year	Gold	Silver	Bronze
1996 Rostock	Carla Geurts (NED)	Flavia Rigamonti (SUI)	Sarah Collings (GBR)
1998 Sheffield	Flavia Rigamonti (SUI)	Carla Geurts (NED)	Sarah Collings (GBR)
1999 Lisbon	Yana Klochkova (UKR)	Flavia Rigamonti (SUI)	Jana Henke (GER)
2000 Valencia	Chantal Strasser (SUI)	Rebecca Cooke (GBR)	Jana Pechanová (CZE)
2001 Antwerp	Flavia Rigamonti (SUI)	Anja Čarman (SLO)	Irina Ufimtseva (RUS)
2002 Riesa	Éva Risztov (HUN)	Flavia Rigamonti (SUI)	Hannah Stockbauer (GER)
2003 Dublin	Erika Villaecija (ESP)	Rebecca Cooke (GBR)	Éva Risztov (HUN)
2004 Vienna	Flavia Rigamonti (SUI)	Lotte Friis (DEN)	Erika Villaecija (ESP)
2005 Trieste	Laure Manaudou (FRA)	Anastasia Ivanenko (RUS)	Flavia Rigamonti (SUI)
2006 Helsinki	Laure Manaudou (FRA)	Anastasia Ivanenko (RUS)	Erika Villaecija (ESP)
2007 Debrecen	Lotte Friis (DEN)	Erika Villaecija (ESP)	Alessia Filippi (ITA)
2008 Rijeka	Alessia Filippi (ITA)	Coralie Balmy (FRA)	Lotte Friis (DEN)
2009 Istanbul	Lotte Friis (DEN)	Erika Villaecija (ESP)	Ophelie Cyrielle Etienne (FRA)
2010 Eindhoven	Federica Pellegrini (ITA)	Boglárka Kapás (HUN)	Gráinne Murphy (IRL)
2011 Szczecin	Lotte Friis (DEN)	Erika Villaecija (ESP)	Melanie Costa (ESP)
2012 Chartres	Lotte Friis (DEN)	Hannah Miley (GBR)	Aimee Willmott (GBR)
2013 Herning	Mireia Belmonte (ESP)	Lotte Friis (DEN)	Sharon van Rouwendaal (NED)
2015 Netanya	Jazmin Carlin (GBR)	Boglárka Kapás (HUN)	Sharon van Rouwendaal (NED)
2017 Copenhagen	Sarah Köhler (GER)	Boglárka Kapás (HUN)	Simona Quadarella (ITA)
2019 Glasgow	Simona Quadarella (ITA)	Ajna Késely (HUN)	Martina Caramignoli (ITA)
2021 Kazan	Anastasiya Kirpichnikova (RUS)	Simona Quadarella (ITA)	Isabel Marie Gose (GER)
2023 Otopeni	Anastasiya Kirpichnikova (FRA)	Simona Quadarella (ITA)	Ajna Késely (HUN)
2025 Lublin	Isabel Gose (GER)	Simona Quadarella (ITA)	Maya Werner (GER)

=== 1500 m freestyle ===
Year	Gold	Silver	Bronze
2021 Kazan	Anastasiya Kirpichnikova (RUS)	Simona Quadarella (ITA)	Martina Caramignoli (ITA)
2023 Otopeni	Anastasiya Kirpichnikova (FRA)	Simona Quadarella (ITA)	Ajna Késely (HUN)
2025 Lublin	Simona Quadarella (ITA)	Maya Werner (GER)	Ajna Késely (HUN)

=== 50 m backstroke ===
Year	Gold	Silver	Bronze
1991 Gelsenkirchen	Sandra Völker (GER)	Anja Eichhorst (GER)	Andrea Kutz (GER)
1992 Espoo	Sandra Völker (GER)	Nina Zhivanevskaya (RUS)	Anja Eichhorst (GER)
1993 Gateshead	Sandra Völker (GER)	Nina Zhivanevskaya (RUS)	Andrea Kutz (GER)
1994 Stavanger	Sandra Völker (GER)	Dagmara Komorowicz (POL)	Martina Moravcová (SVK)
1996 Rostock	Sandra Völker (GER)	Antje Buschschulte (GER)	Suze Valen (NED)
1998 Sheffield	Sandra Völker (GER)	Therese Alshammar (SWE)	Alena Nývltová (CZE)
1999 Lisbon	Sandra Völker (GER)	Nina Zhivanevskaya (ESP)	Antje Buschschulte (GER)
2000 Valencia	Ilona Hlaváčková (CZE)	Nina Zhivanevskaya (ESP)	Daniela Samulski (GER)
2001 Antwerp	Ilona Hlaváčková (CZE)	Anu Koivisto (FIN)	Janine Pietsch (GER)
2002 Riesa	Antje Buschschulte (GER)	Ilona Hlaváčková (CZE)	Janine Pietsch (GER)
2003 Dublin	Ilona Hlaváčková (CZE)	Antje Buschschulte (GER)	Louise Ørnstedt (DEN)
2004 Vienna	Antje Buschschulte (GER)	Kateryna Zubkova (UKR)	Ilona Hlaváčková (CZE)
2005 Trieste	Louise Ørnstedt (DEN)	Janine Pietsch (GER)	Aleksandra Gerasimenya (BLR)
2006 Helsinki	Janine Pietsch (GER)	Iryna Amshennikova (UKR)	Anna Gostomelsky (ISR)
2007 Debrecen	Sanja Jovanović (CRO)	Janine Pietsch (GER)	Fabienne Nadarajah (AUT)
2008 Rijeka	Sanja Jovanović (CRO)	Kateryna Zubkova (UKR)	Elena Gemo (ITA)
2009 Istanbul	Sanja Jovanović (CRO)	Aleksandra Gerasimenya (BLR)	Ksenia Moskvina (RUS)
2010 Eindhoven	Sanja Jovanović (CRO)	Elena Gemo (ITA)	Simona Baumrtová (CZE)
2011 Szczecin	Anastasia Zuyeva (RUS)	Georgia Davies (GBR)	Simona Baumrtová (CZE)
2012 Chartres	Laure Manaudou (FRA)	Sanja Jovanović (CRO)	Simona Baumrtová (CZE)
2013 Herning	Simona Baumrtová (CZE)	Aleksandra Urbanczyk (POL)	Michelle Coleman (SWE)
2015 Netanya	Katinka Hosszú (HUN)	Aleksandra Urbanczyk (POL)	Sanja Jovanović (CRO)
2017 Copenhagen	Katinka Hosszú (HUN)	Alicja Tchórz (POL)	Maaike de Waard (NED)
2019 Glasgow	Kira Toussaint (NED)	Béryl Gastaldello (FRA)	Alicja Tchórz (POL)
2021 Kazan	Kira Toussaint (NED)	Analia Pigrée (FRA)	Maaike de Waard (NED)
2023 Otopeni	Kira Toussaint (NED)	Louise Hansson (SWE)	Analia Pigrée (FRA)
2025 Lublin	Sara Curtis (ITA)	Analia Pigrée (FRA)	Maaike de Waard (NED)

=== 100 m backstroke ===
Year	Gold	Silver	Bronze
1996 Rostock	Antje Buschschulte (GER)	Kateřina Pivoňková (CZE)	Alenka Kejžar (SLO)
1998 Sheffield	Sandra Völker (GER)	Antje Buschschulte (GER)	Alena Nývltová (CZE)
1999 Lisbon	Nina Zhivanevskaya (ESP)	Antje Buschschulte (GER)	Sarah Price (GBR)
2000 Valencia	Ilona Hlaváčková (CZE)	Katy Sexton (GBR)	Nina Zhivanevskaya (ESP)
2001 Antwerp	Ilona Hlaváčková (CZE)	Sarah Price (GBR)	Janine Pietsch (GER)
2002 Riesa	Antje Buschschulte (GER)	Ilona Hlaváčková (CZE)	Sarah Price (GBR)
2003 Dublin	Antje Buschschulte (GER)	Ilona Hlaváčková (CZE)	Laure Manaudou (FRA)
2004 Vienna	Kateryna Zubkova (UKR)	Antje Buschschulte (GER)	Louise Ørnstedt (DEN)
2005 Trieste	Laure Manaudou (FRA)	Louise Ørnstedt (DEN)	Janine Pietsch (GER)
2006 Helsinki	Laure Manaudou (FRA)	Antje Buschschulte (GER)	Iryna Amshennikova (UKR)
2007 Debrecen	Laure Manaudou (FRA)	Sanja Jovanović (CRO)	Janine Pietsch (GER)
2008 Rijeka	Sanja Jovanović (CRO)	Kateryna Zubkova (UKR)	Laure Manaudou (FRA)
2009 Istanbul	Ksenia Moskvina (RUS)	Sanja Jovanović (CRO)	Aleksandra Gerasimenya (BLR)
2010 Eindhoven	Daryna Zevina (UKR)	Sharon van Rouwendaal (NED)	Duane Da Rocha (ESP)
2011 Szczecin	Daryna Zevina (UKR)	Anastasia Zuyeva (RUS)	Mie Nielsen (DEN)
2012 Chartres	Daryna Zevina (UKR)	Laure Manaudou (FRA)	Simona Baumrtová (CZE)
2013 Herning	Mie Nielsen (DEN)	Simona Baumrtová (CZE)	Daryna Zevina (UKR)
2015 Netanya	Katinka Hosszú (HUN)	Alicja Tchórz (POL)	Eygló Ósk Gústafsdóttir (ISL)
2017 Copenhagen	Katinka Hosszú (HUN)	Kira Toussaint (NED)	Maria Kameneva (RUS)
2019 Glasgow	Kira Toussaint (NED)	Maria Kameneva (RUS)	Georgia Davies (GBR)
2021 Kazan	Kira Toussaint (NED)	Maaike de Waard (NED)	Analia Pigrée (FRA)
2023 Otopeni	Kira Toussaint (NED)	Medi Harris (GBR)	Mary-Ambre Moluh (FRA)
2025 Lublin	Lauren Cox (GBR)	Maaike de Waard (NED)	Nina Jane Holt (GER)

=== 200 m backstroke ===
Year	Gold	Silver	Bronze
1996 Rostock	Kateřina Pivoňková (CZE)	Antje Buschschulte (GER)	Alenka Kejžar (SLO)
1998 Sheffield	Antje Buschschulte (GER)	Helen Don-Duncan (GBR)	Yuliya Fomenko (RUS)
1999 Lisbon	Antje Buschschulte (GER)	Nina Zhivanevskaya (ESP)	Nicole Hetzer (GER)
2000 Valencia	Joanna Fargus (GBR)	Nina Zhivanevskaya (ESP)	Anja Čarman (SLO)
2001 Antwerp	Sarah Price (GBR)	Nicole Hetzer (GER)	Anu Koivisto (FIN)
2002 Riesa	Sarah Price (GBR)	Antje Buschschulte (GER)	Stanislava Komarova (RUS)
2003 Dublin	Antje Buschschulte (GER)	Stanislava Komarova (RUS)	Iryna Amshennikova (UKR)
2004 Vienna	Louise Ørnstedt (DEN)	Sarah Price (GBR)	Gemma Spofforth (GBR)
2005 Trieste	Iryna Amshennikova (UKR)	Louise Ørnstedt (DEN)	Annika Liebs (GER)
2006 Helsinki	Esther Baron (FRA)	Iryna Amshennikova (UKR)	Elizabeth Simmonds (GBR)
2007 Debrecen	Anja Čarman (SLO)	Esther Baron (FRA)	Iryna Amshennikova (UKR)
2008 Rijeka	Alexandra Putra (FRA)	Alexianne Castel (FRA)	Elizabeth Simmonds (GBR)
2009 Istanbul	Alexianne Castel (FRA)	Jenny Mensing (GER)	Pernille Larsen (DEN)
2010 Eindhoven	Duane Da Rocha (ESP)	Sharon van Rouwendaal (NED)	Daryna Zevina (UKR)
2011 Szczecin	Daryna Zevina (UKR)	Duane da Rocha (ESP)	Melanie Nocher (IRL)
2012 Chartres	Daryna Zevina (UKR)	Alexianne Castel (FRA)	Simona Baumrtová (CZE)
2013 Herning	Daryna Zevina (UKR)	Simona Baumrtová (CZE)	Katinka Hosszú (HUN)
2015 Netanya	Katinka Hosszú (HUN)	Daria Ustinova (RUS)	Eygló Ósk Gústafsdóttir (ISL)
2017 Copenhagen	Katinka Hosszú (HUN)	Daryna Zevina (UKR)	Margherita Panziera (ITA)
2019 Glasgow	Margherita Panziera (ITA)	Daryna Zevina (UKR)	Kira Toussaint (NED)
2021 Kazan	Kira Toussaint (NED)	Margherita Panziera (ITA)	Lena Grabowski (AUT)
2023 Otopeni	Medi Harris (GBR)	Katie Shanahan (GBR)	Pauline Mahieu (FRA)
2025 Lublin	Carmen Weiler Sastre (ESP)	Katie Shanahan (GBR)	Pauline Mahieu (FRA)

=== 50 m breaststroke ===
Year	Gold	Silver	Bronze
1991 Gelsenkirchen	Peggy Hartung (GER)	Sylvia Gerasch (GER)	Jana Dorriës (GER)
1992 Espoo	Louise Karlsson (SWE)	Peggy Hartung (GER)	Alicja Pęczak (POL)
1993 Gateshead	Sylvia Gerasch (GER)	Peggy Hartung (GER)	none awarded
1993 Gateshead	Sylvia Gerasch (GER)	Karen Rake (GBR)	none awarded
1994 Stavanger	Emma Igelström (SWE)	Elin Austevoll (NOR)	Terrie Miller (NOR)
1996 Rostock	Vera Lischka (AUT)	Terrie Miller (NOR)	Hanna Jaltner (SWE)
1998 Sheffield	Sylvia Gerasch (GER)	Vera Lischka (AUT)	Jaime King (GBR)
1999 Lisbon	Zoë Baker (GBR)	Ágnes Kovács (HUN)	Janne Schäfer (GER)
2000 Valencia	Emma Igelström (SWE)	Agnieszka Braszkiewicz (POL)	Anne-Mari Gulbrandsen (NOR)
2001 Antwerp	Emma Igelström (SWE)	Janne Schäfer (GER)	Vera Lischka (AUT)
2002 Riesa	Emma Igelström (SWE)	Sarah Poewe (GER)	Janne Schäfer (GER)
2003 Dublin	Sarah Poewe (GER)	Emma Igelström (SWE)	Yelena Bogomazova (RUS)
2004 Vienna	Sarah Poewe (GER)	Yelena Bogomazova (RUS)	Kate Haywood (GBR)
2005 Trieste	Janne Schäfer (GER)	Beata Kaminska (POL)	Yelena Bogomazova (RUS)
2006 Helsinki	Janne Schäfer (GER)	Kate Haywood (GBR)	Yelena Bogomazova (RUS)
2007 Debrecen	Janne Schäfer (GER)	none awarded	Sarah Poewe (GER)
2007 Debrecen	Yuliya Yefimova (RUS)	none awarded	Sarah Poewe (GER)
2008 Rijeka	Valentina Artemyeva (RUS)	Janne Schäfer (GER)	Moniek Nijhuis (NED)
2009 Istanbul	Moniek Nijhuis (NED)	Jane Trepp (EST)	Janne Schäfer (GER)
2010 Eindhoven	Dorothea Brandt (GER)	Moniek Nijhuis (NED)	Valentina Artemyeva (RUS)
2011 Szczecin	Valentina Artemyeva (RUS)	Dorothea Brandt (GER)	Daria Deeva (RUS)
2012 Chartres	Petra Chocová (CZE)	Rikke Møller Pedersen (DEN)	Sycerika McMahon (IRL)
2013 Herning	Yuliya Yefimova (RUS)	Rūta Meilutytė (LTU)	Moniek Nijhuis (NED)
2015 Netanya	Jenna Laukkanen (FIN)	Fanny Lecluyse (BEL)	Natalia Ivaneeva (RUS)
2017 Copenhagen	Rūta Meilutytė (LTU)	Jenna Laukkanen (FIN)	Sophie Hansson (SWE)
2019 Glasgow	Benedetta Pilato (ITA)	Martina Carraro (ITA)	Mona McSharry (IRL)
2021 Kazan	Arianna Castiglioni (ITA)	Benedetta Pilato (ITA)	Nika Godun (RUS)
2023 Otopeni	Benedetta Pilato (ITA)	Eneli Jefimova (EST)	Jasmine Nocentini (ITA)
2023 Otopeni	Benedetta Pilato (ITA)	Eneli Jefimova (EST)	Imogen Clark (GBR)
2025 Lublin	Eneli Jefimova (EST)	Rūta Meilutytė (LTU)	Florine Gaspard (BEL)

=== 100 m breaststroke ===
Year	Gold	Silver	Bronze
1996 Rostock	Terrie Miller (NOR)	Vera Lischka (AUT)	Alicja Pęczak (POL)
1998 Sheffield	Brigitte Becue (BEL)	none awarded	Svitlana Bondarenko (UKR)
1998 Sheffield	Alicja Pęczak (POL)	none awarded	Svitlana Bondarenko (UKR)
1999 Lisbon	Brigitte Becue (BEL)	Ágnes Kovács (HUN)	Emma Igelström (SWE)
2000 Valencia	Alicja Pęczak (POL)	Emma Igelström (SWE)	Anne-Mari Gulbrandsen (NOR)
2001 Antwerp	Anne Poleska (GER)	Mirna Jukić (AUT)	Heidi Earp (GBR)
2002 Riesa	Sarah Poewe (GER)	Mirna Jukić (AUT)	Ágnes Kovács (HUN)
2003 Dublin	Sarah Poewe (GER)	Yelena Bogomazova (RUS)	Mirna Jukić (AUT)
2004 Vienna	Sarah Poewe (GER)	Mirna Jukić (AUT)	Simone Weiler (GER)
2005 Trieste	Beata Kaminska (POL)	Yelena Bogomazova (RUS)	Simone Weiler (GER)
2005 Trieste	Beata Kaminska (POL)	Yelena Bogomazova (RUS)	Chiara Boggiatto (ITA)
2006 Helsinki	Anna Khlistunova (UKR)	Kirsty Balfour (GBR)	Janne Schäfer (GER)
2007 Debrecen	Yuliya Yefimova (RUS)	Mirna Jukić (AUT)	Yelena Bogomazova (RUS)
2008 Rijeka	Valentina Artemyeva (RUS)	Sophie de Ronchi (FRA)	Mirna Jukić (AUT)
2009 Istanbul	Caroline Ruhnau (GER)	Moniek Nijhuis (NED)	Jennie Johansson (SWE)
2010 Eindhoven	Moniek Nijhuis (NED)	Sophie de Ronchi (FRA)	Tessa Brouwer (NED)
2011 Szczecin	Valentina Artemyeva (RUS)	Rikke Møller-Pedersen (DEN)	Daria Deeva (RUS)
2012 Chartres	Rikke Møller Pedersen (DEN)	Petra Chocová (CZE)	Marina García Urzainqui (ESP)
2013 Herning	Rūta Meilutytė (LTU)	Yuliya Yefimova (RUS)	Rikke Møller Pedersen (DEN)
2015 Netanya	Jenna Laukkanen (FIN)	Moniek Nijhuis (NED)	Viktoriya Zeynep Gunes (TUR)
2017 Copenhagen	Rūta Meilutytė (LTU)	Jenna Laukkanen (FIN)	Jessica Vall (ESP)
2019 Glasgow	Martina Carraro (ITA)	Arianna Castiglioni (ITA)	Jenna Laukkanen (FIN)
2021 Kazan	Martina Carraro (ITA)	Evgeniia Chikunova (RUS)	none awarded
2021 Kazan	Martina Carraro (ITA)	Eneli Jefimova (EST)	none awarded
2023 Otopeni	Eneli Jefimova (EST)	Benedetta Pilato (ITA)	Tes Schouten (NED)
2025 Lublin	Eneli Jefimova (EST)	Florine Gaspard (BEL)	Anastasia Gorbenko (ISR)

=== 200 m breaststroke ===
Year	Gold	Silver	Bronze
1996 Rostock	Alicja Pęczak (POL)	Alenka Kejžar (SLO)	Anne Poleska (GER)
1998 Sheffield	Alicja Pęczak (POL)	Lourdes Becerra (ESP)	Anne Poleska (GER)
1999 Lisbon	Anne Poleska (GER)	Ágnes Kovács (HUN)	Brigitte Becue (BEL)
2000 Valencia	Emma Igelström (SWE)	Alicja Pęczak (POL)	Anne-Mari Gulbrandsen (NOR)
2001 Antwerp	Anne Poleska (GER)	Mirna Jukić (AUT)	Emma Igelström (SWE)
2002 Riesa	Mirna Jukić (AUT)	Sarah Poewe (GER)	Anne Poleska (GER)
2003 Dublin	Mirna Jukić (AUT)	Anne Poleska (GER)	Simone Weiler (GER)
2004 Vienna	Anne Poleska (GER)	Mirna Jukić (AUT)	Sarah Poewe (GER)
2005 Trieste	Anne Poleska (GER)	Katarzyna Dulian (POL)	Chiara Boggiatto (ITA)
2006 Helsinki	Kirsty Balfour (GBR)	Anne Poleska (GER)	Beata Kamińska (POL)
2007 Debrecen	Yuliya Yefimova (RUS)	Mirna Jukić (AUT)	Anne Poleska (GER)
2008 Rijeka	Alena Alekseeva (RUS)	Mirna Jukić (AUT)	Patrizia Humplik (SUI)
2009 Istanbul	Rikke Møller-Pedersen (DEN)	Nađa Higl (SRB)	Joline Höstman (SWE)
2010 Eindhoven	Anastasia Chaun (RUS)	Tanja Šmid (SLO)	Chiara Boggiatto (ITA)
2011 Szczecin	Rikke Møller-Pedersen (DEN)	Anastasia Chaun (RUS)	Fanny Lecluyse (BEL)
2012 Chartres	Rikke Møller Pedersen (DEN)	Marina García Urzainqui (ESP)	Hanna Dzerkal (UKR)
2013 Herning	Yuliya Yefimova (RUS)	Rikke Møller Pedersen (DEN)	Vitalina Simonova (RUS)
2015 Netanya	Fanny Lecluyse (BEL)	Maria Astashkina (RUS)	Viktoriya Zeynep Gunes (TUR)
2017 Copenhagen	Jessica Vall (ESP)	Rikke Møller Pedersen (DEN)	Fanny Lecluyse (BEL)
2019 Glasgow	Maria Temnikova (RUS)	Molly Renshaw (GBR)	Martina Carraro (ITA)
2021 Kazan	Evgeniia Chikunova (RUS)	Maria Temnikova (RUS)	Francesca Fangio (ITA)
2023 Otopeni	Tes Schouten (NED)	Thea Blomsterberg (DEN)	Kristýna Horská (CZE)
2025 Lublin	Anna Elendt (GER)	Angharad Evans (GBR)	Kotryna Teterevkova (LTU)

=== 50 m butterfly ===
Year	Gold	Silver	Bronze
1991 Gelsenkirchen	Inge de Bruijn (NED)	Louise Karlsson (SWE)	Christiane Sievert (GER)
1992 Espoo	Louise Karlsson (SWE)	Inge de Bruijn (NED)	Susanne Müller (GER)
1993 Gateshead	Louise Karlsson (SWE)	Svetlana Pozdeyeva (RUS)	Julia Voitowitsch (GER)
1994 Stavanger	Angela Postma (NED)	Martina Moravcová (SVK)	Julia Voitowitsch (GER)
1996 Rostock	Johanna Sjöberg (SWE)	Sandra Völker (GER)	Marja Pärssinen (FIN)
1998 Sheffield	Inge de Bruijn (NED)	Anna-Karin Kammerling (SWE)	Johanna Sjöberg (SWE)
1999 Lisbon	Anna-Karin Kammerling (SWE)	Johanna Sjöberg (SWE)	Nicola Jackson (GBR)
2000 Valencia	Anna-Karin Kammerling (SWE)	Karen Egdal (DEN)	Johanna Sjöberg (SWE)
2001 Antwerp	Therese Alshammar (SWE)	Anna-Karin Kammerling (SWE)	Natalia Soutiaguina (RUS)
2002 Riesa	Anna-Karin Kammerling (SWE)	Lena Hallander (SWE)	Vered Borochovski (ISR)
2003 Dublin	Anna-Karin Kammerling (SWE)	Martina Moravcová (SVK)	Fabienne Nadarajah (AUT)
2004 Vienna	Anna-Karin Kammerling (SWE)	Martina Moravcová (SVK)	Fabienne Nadarajah (AUT)
2005 Trieste	Anna-Karin Kammerling (SWE)	Inge Dekker (NED)	Fabienne Nadarajah (AUT)
2006 Helsinki	Therese Alshammar (SWE)	Inge Dekker (NED)	Anna-Karin Kammerling (SWE)
2007 Debrecen	Anna-Karin Kammerling (SWE)	Inge Dekker (NED)	Hinkelien Schreuder (NED)
2008 Rijeka	Hinkelien Schreuder (NED)	Jeanette Ottesen (DEN)	Diane Bui Duyet (FRA)
2009 Istanbul	Inge Dekker (NED)	none awarded	Ingvild Snildal (NOR)
2009 Istanbul	Hinkelien Schreuder (NED)	none awarded	Ingvild Snildal (NOR)
2010 Eindhoven	Inge Dekker (NED)	Hinkelien Schreuder (NED)	Triin Aljand (EST)
2011 Szczecin	Jeanette Ottesen (DEN)	Triin Aljand (EST)	Sviatlana Khakhlova (BLR)
2012 Chartres	Jeanette Ottesen (DEN)	Aleksandra Gerasimenya (BLR)	Mélanie Henique (FRA)
2013 Herning	Sarah Sjöström (SWE)	Jeanette Ottesen (DEN)	Inge Dekker (NED)
2015 Netanya	Sarah Sjöström (SWE)	Jeanette Ottesen (DEN)	Silvia Di Pietro (ITA)
2017 Copenhagen	Ranomi Kromowidjojo (NED)	Emilie Beckmann (DEN)	Maaike de Waard (NED)
2019 Glasgow	Mélanie Henique (FRA)	Béryl Gastaldello (FRA)	Emilie Beckmann (DEN)
2019 Glasgow	Mélanie Henique (FRA)	Béryl Gastaldello (FRA)	Jeanette Ottesen (DEN)
2021 Kazan	Sarah Sjöström (SWE)	Maaike de Waard (NED)	Silvia Di Pietro (ITA)
2021 Kazan	Sarah Sjöström (SWE)	Maaike de Waard (NED)	Anna Ntountounaki (GRE)
2023 Otopeni	Anna Ntountounaki (GRE)	none awarded	Sara Junevik (SWE)
2023 Otopeni	Tessa Giele (NED)	none awarded	Sara Junevik (SWE)
2025 Lublin	Martine Damborg (DEN)	Roos Vanotterdijk (BEL)	Beryl Gastaldello (FRA)

=== 100 m butterfly ===
Year	Gold	Silver	Bronze
1996 Rostock	Johanna Sjöberg (SWE)	Sandra Völker (GER)	Julia Voitowitsch (GER)
1998 Sheffield	Martina Moravcová (SVK)	Johanna Sjöberg (SWE)	Inge de Bruijn (NED)
1999 Lisbon	Johanna Sjöberg (SWE)	Mette Jacobsen (DEN)	Sophia Skou (DEN)
2000 Valencia	Martina Moravcová (SVK)	Johanna Sjöberg (SWE)	Mette Jacobsen (DEN)
2001 Antwerp	Martina Moravcová (SVK)	Johanna Sjöberg (SWE)	Anna-Karin Kammerling (SWE)
2002 Riesa	Martina Moravcová (SVK)	Anna-Karin Kammerling (SWE)	Mette Jacobsen (DEN)
2003 Dublin	Martina Moravcová (SVK)	Johanna Sjöberg (SWE)	Alena Popchanka (BLR)
2004 Vienna	Martina Moravcová (SVK)	Mette Jacobsen (DEN)	Malia Metella (FRA)
2005 Trieste	Martina Moravcová (SVK)	Alena Popchanka (FRA)	Johanna Sjöberg (SWE)
2006 Helsinki	Antje Buschschulte (GER)	Inge Dekker (NED)	Martina Moravcová (SVK)
2007 Debrecen	Inge Dekker (NED)	Alena Popchanka (FRA)	Otylia Jędrzejczak (POL)
2008 Rijeka	Jeanette Ottesen (DEN)	Diane Bui Duyet (FRA)	Eszter Dara (HUN)
2009 Istanbul	Inge Dekker (NED)	Diane Bui Duyet (FRA)	Jeanette Ottesen (DEN)
2010 Eindhoven	Inge Dekker (NED)	Ingvild Snildal (NOR)	Caterina Giacchetti (ITA)
2011 Szczecin	Jeanette Ottesen (DEN)	Jemma Lowe (GBR)	Ilaria Bianchi (ITA)
2012 Chartres	Ilaria Bianchi (ITA)	Kimberly Buys (BEL)	Jeanette Ottesen (DEN)
2013 Herning	Sarah Sjöström (SWE)	Jemma Lowe (GBR)	Jeanette Ottesen (DEN)
2015 Netanya	Sarah Sjöström (SWE)	Jeanette Ottesen (DEN)	Alexandra Wenk (GER)
2017 Copenhagen	Sarah Sjöström (SWE)	Marie Wattel (FRA)	Emilie Beckmann (DEN)
2019 Glasgow	Anastasiya Shkurdai (BLR)	Elena Di Liddo (ITA)	Anna Ntountounaki (GRE)
2021 Kazan	Sarah Sjöström (SWE)	Anna Ntountounaki (GRE)	none awarded
2021 Kazan	Sarah Sjöström (SWE)	Anastasiya Shkurdai (BLR)	none awarded
2023 Otopeni	Louise Hansson (SWE)	Angelina Köhler (GER)	Anna Ntountounaki (GRE)
2025 Lublin	Martine Damborg (DEN)	Tessa Giele (NED)	Louise Hansson (SWE)

=== 200 m butterfly ===
Year	Gold	Silver	Bronze
1996 Rostock	Bárbara Franco (ESP)	Johanna Sjöberg (SWE)	María Peláez (ESP)
1998 Sheffield	Sophia Skou (DEN)	Mette Jacobsen (DEN)	Johanna Sjöberg (SWE)
1999 Lisbon	Mette Jacobsen (DEN)	Johanna Sjöberg (SWE)	Sophia Skou (DEN)
2000 Valencia	Annika Mehlhorn (GER)	Mette Jacobsen (DEN)	Petra Zahrl (AUT)
2001 Antwerp	Otylia Jędrzejczak (POL)	Mette Jacobsen (DEN)	Georgina Lee (GBR)
2002 Riesa	Éva Risztov (HUN)	Mette Jacobsen (DEN)	Roser Vives (ESP)
2003 Dublin	Éva Risztov (HUN)	Francesca Segat (ITA)	Mette Jacobsen (DEN)
2004 Vienna	Martina Moravcová (SVK)	Mette Jacobsen (DEN)	Caterina Giacchetti (ITA)
2005 Trieste	Beatrix Boulsevicz (HUN)	Mette Jacobsen (DEN)	Aurore Mongel (FRA)
2006 Helsinki	Otylia Jędrzejczak (POL)	Beatrix Boulsevicz (HUN)	Jessica Dickons (GBR)
2007 Debrecen	Otylia Jędrzejczak (POL)	Emese Kovács (HUN)	Annika Mehlhorn (GER)
2008 Rijeka	Petra Granlund (SWE)	Aurore Mongel (FRA)	Jemma Lowe (GBR)
2009 Istanbul	Aurore Mongel (FRA)	Petra Granlund (SWE)	Franziska Hentke (GER)
2010 Eindhoven	Zsuzsanna Jakabos (HUN)	Alessia Polieri (ITA)	Caterina Giacchetti (ITA)
2011 Szczecin	Mireia Belmonte (ESP)	Jemma Lowe (GBR)	Jessica Dickons (GBR)
2012 Chartres	Katinka Hosszú (HUN)	Stefania Pirozzi (ITA)	Alessia Polieri (ITA)
2013 Herning	Mireia Belmonte (ESP)	Franziska Hentke (GER)	Jemma Lowe (GBR)
2015 Netanya	Franziska Hentke (GER)	Lara Grangeon (FRA)	Alessia Polieri (ITA)
2017 Copenhagen	Franziska Hentke (GER)	Ilaria Bianchi (ITA)	Lara Grangeon (FRA)
2019 Glasgow	Katinka Hosszú (HUN)	Ilaria Bianchi (ITA)	Zsuzsanna Jakabos (HUN)
2021 Kazan	Svetlana Chimrova (RUS)	Helena Rosendahl Bach (DEN)	Ilaria Bianchi (ITA)
2023 Otopeni	Angelina Köhler (GER)	Helena Rosendahl Bach (DEN)	Lana Pudar (BIH)
2025 Lublin	Ellen Walshe (IRL)	Helena Rosendahl Bach (DEN)	Anita Gastaldi (ITA)

=== 100 m individual medley ===
Year	Gold	Silver	Bronze
1991 Gelsenkirchen	Louise Karlsson (SWE)	Daniela Hunger (GER)	Marion Zoller (GER)
1992 Espoo	Louise Karlsson (SWE)	Daniela Hunger (GER)	Alicja Pęczak (POL)
1993 Gateshead	Louise Karlsson (SWE)	Ulrika Jardfelt (SWE)	Sylvia Gerasch (GER)
1994 Stavanger	Louise Karlsson (SWE)	Sue Rolph (GBR)	Daniela Hunger (GER)
1996 Rostock	Sue Rolph (GBR)	Martina Moravcová (SVK)	Sabine Herbst (GER)
1998 Sheffield	Martina Moravcová (SVK)	Nataša Kejžar (SLO)	Sue Rolph (GBR)
1999 Lisbon	Martina Moravcová (SVK)	Annika Mehlhorn (GER)	Nataša Kejžar (SLO)
2000 Valencia	Martina Moravcová (SVK)	Annika Mehlhorn (GER)	Sue Rolph (GBR)
2001 Antwerp	Martina Moravcová (SVK)	Alenka Kejžar (SLO)	Oxana Verevka (RUS)
2002 Riesa	Martina Moravcová (SVK)	Alison Sheppard (GBR)	Alenka Kejžar (SLO)
2003 Dublin	Alison Sheppard (GBR)	Alenka Kejžar (SLO)	Hanna Shcherba (BLR)
2004 Vienna	Aleksandra Urbanczyk (POL)	Lisa Chapman (GBR)	Teresa Rohmann (GER)
2005 Trieste	Hanna-Maria Seppälä (FIN)	Hanna Eriksson (SWE)	Hinkelien Schreuder (NED)
2006 Helsinki	Hanna-Maria Seppälä (FIN)	Ganna Dzerkaľ (UKR)	Svitlana Khakhlova (BLR)
2007 Debrecen	Hanna-Maria Seppälä (FIN)	Aleksandra Urbanczyk (POL)	Sophie de Ronchi (FRA)
2008 Rijeka	Hanna-Maria Seppälä (FIN)	Evelyn Verrasztó (HUN)	Francesca Segat (ITA)
2009 Istanbul	Hinkelien Schreuder (NED)	Evelyn Verrasztó (HUN)	Hanna-Maria Seppälä (FIN)
2010 Eindhoven	Evelyn Verrasztó (HUN)	Hinkelien Schreuder (NED)	Theresa Michalak (GER)
2011 Szczecin	Theresa Michalak (GER)	Zsuzsanna Jakabos (HUN)	Mie Nielsen (DEN)
2012 Chartres	Katinka Hosszú (HUN)	Zsuzsanna Jakabos (HUN)	Siobhan-Marie O'Connor (GBR)
2013 Herning	Rūta Meilutytė (LTU)	Katinka Hosszú (HUN)	Siobhan-Marie O'Connor (GBR)
2015 Netanya	Katinka Hosszú (HUN)	Siobhan-Marie O'Connor (GBR)	Marrit Steenbergen (NED)
2017 Copenhagen	Katinka Hosszú (HUN)	Sarah Sjöström (SWE)	Susann Bjørnsen (NOR)
2019 Glasgow	Katinka Hosszú (HUN)	Maria Kameneva (RUS)	Jenna Laukkanen (FIN)
2021 Kazan	Alicja Tchórz (POL)	Maria Kameneva (RUS)	Sarah Sjöström (SWE)
2023 Otopeni	Charlotte Bonnet (FRA)	Béryl Gastaldello (FRA)	Louise Hansson (SWE)
2025 Lublin	Marrit Steenbergen (NED)	Roos Vanotterdijk (BEL)	Anastasia Gorbenko (ISR)

=== 200 m individual medley ===
Year	Gold	Silver	Bronze
1996 Rostock	Sue Rolph (GBR)	Alicja Pęczak (POL)	Sabine Herbst (GER)
1998 Sheffield	Alicja Pęczak (POL)	Nicole Hetzer (GER)	Sue Rolph (GBR)
1999 Lisbon	Yana Klochkova (UKR)	Martina Moravcová (SVK)	Sue Rolph (GBR)
2000 Valencia	Yana Klochkova (UKR)	Oxana Verevka (RUS)	Sue Rolph (GBR)
2001 Antwerp	Yana Klochkova (UKR)	Nicole Hetzer (GER)	Alenka Kejžar (SLO)
2002 Riesa	Yana Klochkova (UKR)	Alenka Kejžar (SLO)	Hanna Shcherba (BLR)
2003 Dublin	Alenka Kejžar (SLO)	Hanna Shcherba (BLR)	Teresa Rohmann (GER)
2004 Vienna	Teresa Rohmann (GER)	Aleksandra Urbanczyk (POL)	Julie Hjørt-Hansen (DEN)
2005 Trieste	Katarzyna Baranowska (POL)	Aleksandra Urbanczyk (POL)	Daria Belyakina (RUS)
2006 Helsinki	Katarzyna Baranowska (POL)	Camille Muffat (FRA)	Aleksandra Urbanczyk (POL)
2007 Debrecen	Camille Muffat (FRA)	Katarzyna Baranowska (POL)	Evelyn Verrasztó (HUN)
2008 Rijeka	Francesca Segat (ITA)	Evelyn Verrasztó (HUN)	Sophie de Ronchi (FRA)
2009 Istanbul	Evelyn Verrasztó (HUN)	Francesca Segat (ITA)	Hannah Miley (GBR)
2010 Eindhoven	Evelyn Verrasztó (HUN)	Kimberly Buys (BEL)	Lara Grangeon (FRA)
2011 Szczecin	Mireia Belmonte (ESP)	Evelyn Verrasztó (HUN)	Hannah Miley (GBR)
2012 Chartres	Katinka Hosszú (HUN)	Hannah Miley (GBR)	Zsuzsanna Jakabos (HUN)
2013 Herning	Katinka Hosszú (HUN)	Siobhan-Marie O'Connor (GBR)	Sophie Allen (GBR)
2015 Netanya	Katinka Hosszú (HUN)	Siobhan-Marie O'Connor (GBR)	Louise Hansson (SWE)
2017 Copenhagen	Katinka Hosszú (HUN)	Evelyn Verrasztó (HUN)	Ilaria Cusinato (ITA)
2019 Glasgow	Katinka Hosszú (HUN)	Maria Ugolkova (SUI)	Siobhan-Marie O'Connor (GBR)
2021 Kazan	Anastasia Gorbenko (ISR)	Maria Ugolkova (SUI)	Viktoriya Güneş (TUR)
2023 Otopeni	Abbie Wood (GBR)	Charlotte Bonnet (FRA)	Lena Kreundl (AUT)
2025 Lublin	Marrit Steenbergen (NED)	Ellen Walshe (IRL)	Anastasia Gorbenko (ISR)

=== 400 m individual medley ===
Year	Gold	Silver	Bronze
1996 Rostock	Sabine Herbst (GER)	Beatrice Câșlaru (ROU)	Pavla Chrástová (CZE)
1998 Sheffield	Hana Černá (CZE)	Nicole Hetzer (GER)	Lourdes Becerra (ESP)
1999 Lisbon	Yana Klochkova (UKR)	Nicole Hetzer (GER)	Hana Černá (CZE)
2000 Valencia	Yana Klochkova (UKR)	Annika Mehlhorn (GER)	Rachael Corner (GBR)
2001 Antwerp	Nicole Hetzer (GER)	Yana Klochkova (UKR)	Alenka Kejžar (SLO)
2002 Riesa	Yana Klochkova (UKR)	Éva Risztov (HUN)	Alenka Kejžar (SLO)
2003 Dublin	Éva Risztov (HUN)	Yana Tolkatcheva (RUS)	Teresa Rohmann (GER)
2004 Vienna	Éva Risztov (HUN)	Teresa Rohmann (GER)	Katinka Hosszú (HUN)
2005 Trieste	Katarzyna Baranowska (POL)	Anastasia Ivanenko (RUS)	Zsuzsanna Jakabos (HUN)
2006 Helsinki	Alessia Filippi (ITA)	Katarzyna Baranowska (POL)	Anastasia Ivanenko (RUS)
2007 Debrecen	Alessia Filippi (ITA)	Mireia Belmonte (ESP)	Camille Muffat (FRA)
2008 Rijeka	Mireia Belmonte (ESP)	Alessia Filippi (ITA)	Francesca Segat (ITA)
2009 Istanbul	Hannah Miley (GBR)	Mireia Belmonte (ESP)	Zsuzsanna Jakabos (HUN)
2010 Eindhoven	Zsuzsanna Jakabos (HUN)	Anja Klinar (SLO)	Lara Grangeon (FRA)
2011 Szczecin	Mireia Belmonte (ESP)	Hannah Miley (GBR)	Zsuzsanna Jakabos (HUN)
2012 Chartres	Hannah Miley (GBR)	Katinka Hosszú (HUN)	Zsuzsanna Jakabos (HUN)
2013 Herning	Mireia Belmonte (ESP)	Katinka Hosszú (HUN)	Aimee Willmott (GBR)
2015 Netanya	Katinka Hosszú (HUN)	Hannah Miley (GBR)	Lara Grangeon (FRA)
2017 Copenhagen	Katinka Hosszú (HUN)	Lara Grangeon (FRA)	Fantine Lesaffre (FRA)
2019 Glasgow	Katinka Hosszú (HUN)	Zsuzsanna Jakabos (HUN)	Ilaria Cusinato (ITA)
2021 Kazan	Viktoriya Güneş (TUR)	Anja Crevar (SER)	none awarded
2021 Kazan	Viktoriya Güneş (TUR)	Sara Franceschi (ITA)	none awarded
2023 Otopeni	Abbie Wood (GBR)	Freya Colbert (GBR)	Ellen Walshe (IRL)
2025 Lublin	Justina Kozan (POL)	Alba Vazquez Ruiz (ESP)	Emma Carrasco Cadens (ESP)

=== 4 × 50 metre freestyle relay ===
Year	Gold	Silver	Bronze
1991 Gelsenkirchen	Germany	Italy	Soviet Union
1992 Espoo	Germany	Sweden	Russia
1993 Gateshead	Sweden; Ellenor Svensson; Linda Olofsson; Louise Karlsson; Susanne Lööv	Germany; Sandra Völker; Annette Hadding; Silvia Stahl; Anke Scholz	Great Britain
1994 Stavanger	Germany	Sweden	Netherlands
1996 Rostock	Germany; Katrin Meissner; Marianne Hinners; Silvia Stahl; Sandra Völker	Sweden; Johanna Sjöberg; Linda Olofsson; Nelly Jörgensen; Malin Svahnström	Switzerland; Dominique Diezi; Andrea Quadri; Sandrine Paquier; Chantal Strasser
1998 Sheffield	Germany; Katrin Meissner; Simone Osygus; Marianne Hinners; Sandra Völker	Netherlands; Angela Postma; Nienke Valen; Wilma van Hofwegen; Inge de Bruijn	Great Britain; Alison Sheppard; Claire Huddart; Karen Pickering; Sue Rolph
1999 Lisbon	Sweden; Johanna Sjöberg; Therese Alshammar; Anna-Karin Kammerling; Malin Svahnström	Germany; Katrin Meissner; Simone Osygus; Sandra Völker; Britta Steffen	Great Britain; Alison Sheppard; Nicola Jackson; Karen Pickering; Sue Rolph
2000 Valencia	Sweden; Annika Lofstedt; Therese Alshammar; Johanna Sjöberg; Anna-Karin Kammerling	Great Britain; Alyson Sheppard; Sue Rolph; Karen Pickering; Rosalind Brett	Germany; Britta Steffen; Petra Dallman; Daniela Samulski; Verena Witte
2001 Antwerp	Sweden; Cathrin Carlzon; Johanna Sjöberg; Therese Alshammar; Anna-Karin Kammerling	Netherlands; Suze Valen; Hinkelien Schreuder; Annabel Kosten; Inge de Bruijn	Germany; Petra Dallman; Ann-Christiane Langmaack; Katrin Meissner; Janine Pietsch
2002 Riesa	Sweden; Josefin Lillhage; Therese Alshammar; Anna-Karin Kammerling; Cathrin Carlzon	Belarus; Aleksandra Gerasimenya; Hanna Shcherba; Sviatlana Khakhlova; Alena Popchanka	Germany; Antje Buschschulte; Dorothea Brandt; Petra Dallman; Janine Pietsch
2003 Dublin	Netherlands	Sweden	Germany
2004 Vienna	Netherlands; Inge Dekker; Hinkelien Schreuder; Chantal Groot; Marleen Veldhuis	Germany; Dorothea Brandt; Janine Pietsch; Daniela Götz; Petra Dallmann	Sweden; Lina Petersson; Anna-Karin Kammerling; Josefin Lillhage; Claire Hedenskog
2005 Trieste	Netherlands; Hinkelien Schreuder; Inge Dekker; Chantal Groot; Marleen Veldhuis	Sweden; Johanna Sjöberg; Anna-Karin Kammerling; Josefin Lillhage; Therese Alshammar	Germany; Dorothea Brandt; Daniela Samulski; Petra Dallmann; Daniela Götz
2006 Helsinki	Sweden; Magdalena Kuras; Therese Alshammar; Anna-Karin Kammerling; Josefin Lillhage	Netherlands; Inge Dekker; Saskia de Jonge; Chantal Groot; Marleen Veldhuis	Germany; Daniela Samulski; Daniela Götz; Melke Freitag; Annika Lurz
2007 Debrecen	Netherlands; Inge Dekker; Hinkelien Schreuder; Ranomi Kromowidjojo; Marleen Veldhuis	Germany; Britta Steffen; Dorothea Brandt; Petra Dallmann; Meike Freitag	Sweden; Claire Hedenskog; Anna-Karin Kammerling; Josefin Lillhage; Magdalena Kuras
2008 Rijeka	Netherlands; Hinkelien Schreuder; Inge Dekker; Ranomi Kromowidjojo; Marleen Veldhuis	Sweden; Petra Granlund; Claire Hedenskog; Sarah Sjöström; Lovisa Ericsson	Germany; Dorothea Brandt; Petra Dallmann; Lisa Vitting; Daniela Schreiber
2009 Istanbul	Netherlands; Inge Dekker; Hinkelien Schreuder; Saskia de Jonge; Ranomi Kromowidjojo	Sweden; Emma Svensson; Josefin Lillhage; Claire Hedenskog; Sarah Sjöström	Germany; Dorothea Brandt; Daniela Samulski; Lisa Vitting; Daniela Schreiber
2010 Eindhoven	Netherlands; Inge Dekker; Femke Heemskerk; Hinkelien Schreuder; Ranomi Kromowidjojo	Germany; Dorothea Brandt; Britta Steffen; Lisa Vitting; Daniela Schreiber	Finland; Marlene Niemi; Emilia Pikkarainen; Lotta Nevalainen; Hanna-Maria Seppälä
2011 Szczecin	Germany; Britta Steffen; Dorothea Brandt; Paulina Schmiedel; Daniela Schreiber	Denmark; Mie Nielsen; Pernille Blume; Katrine Holm Soerensen; Jeanette Ottesen	Italy; Erika Ferraioli; Erica Buratto; Federica Pellegrini; Laura Letrari
2012 Chartres	Denmark; Jeanette Ottesen; Kelly Riber Rasmussen; Julie Levisen; Pernille Blume	Finland; Emilia Pikkarainen; Lotta Nevalainen; Laura Kurki; Hanna-Maria Seppälä	Belarus; Yuliya Khitraya; Aleksandra Gerasimenya; Oksana Demidova; Sviatlana Khakhlova
2013 Herning	Denmark; Pernille Blume; Jeanette Ottesen; Kelly Riber Rasmussen; Mie Nielsen	Sweden; Michelle Coleman; Sarah Sjöström; Louise Hansson; Magdalena Kuras	Russia; Rozaliya Nasretdinova; Veronika Popova; Elizaveta Bazarova; Svetlana Knyaginina
2015 Netanya	Italy; Silvia Di Pietro; Erika Ferraioli; Aglaia Pezzato; Federica Pellegrini	Netherlands; Inge Dekker; Femke Heemskerk; Tamara van Vliet; Ranomi Kromowidjojo	Russia; Rozaliya Nasretdinova; Veronika Popova; Daria Kartashova; Natalia Lovtcova
2017 Copenhagen	Netherlands; Ranomi Kromowidjojo; Femke Heemskerk; Tamara van Vliet; Valerie van Roon	Sweden; Michelle Coleman; Sarah Sjöström; Louise Hansson; Nathalie Lindborg	Denmark; Emilie Beckmann; Mie Nielsen; Julie Kepp Jensen; Pernille Blume
2019 Glasgow	France; Béryl Gastaldello; Mélanie Henique; Léna Bousquin; Anna Santamans	not awarded	Denmark; Julie Kepp Jensen; Jeanette Ottesen; Emilie Beckmann; Pernille Blume
2019 Glasgow	Netherlands; Tamara van Vliet; Kira Toussaint; Femke Heemskerk; Valerie van Roon	not awarded	Denmark; Julie Kepp Jensen; Jeanette Ottesen; Emilie Beckmann; Pernille Blume
2021 Kazan	Russia; Rozaliya Nasretdinova; Arina Surkova; Maria Kameneva; Daria Klepikova	Netherlands; Kim Busch; Maaike de Waard; Kira Toussaint; Valerie van Roon	Poland; Katarzyna Wasick; Kornelia Fiedkiewicz; Dominika Sztandera; Alicja Tchorz
2023 Otopeni	Sweden; Sara Junevik; Michelle Coleman; Louise Hansson; Sofia Åstedt	Italy; Silvia Di Pietro; Costanza Cocconcelli; Chiara Tarantino; Sara Curtis	Great Britain; Anna Hopkin; Freya Anderson; Lucy Hope; Medi Harris
2025 Lublin	Netherlands; Milou van Wijk; Marrit Steenbergen; Tessa Giele; Valerie van Roon; Maaike de Waard; Britta Koehorst	Italy; Silvia di Pietro; Sara Curtis; Agata Maria Ambler; Costanza Cocconcelli; Alessandra Mao	Poland; Katarzyna Wasick; Kornelia Fiedkiewicz; Julia Maik; Barbara Lesniewska

=== 4 × 50 metre medley relay ===
Year	Gold	Silver	Bronze
1991 Gelsenkirchen	Germany	Italy	Great Britain
1992 Espoo	Germany	Sweden	Russia
1993 Gateshead	Germany; Sandra Völker; Sylvia Gerasch; Julia Voitowitsch; Annette Hadding	Sweden; Ulrika Jardfelt; Hanna Jaltner; Louise Karlsson; Linda Olofsson	Great Britain
1994 Stavanger	Germany	Russia	Sweden
1996 Rostock	Germany; Antje Buschschulte; Sylvia Gerasch; Julia Voitowitsch; Sandra Völker	Netherlands; Suze Valen; Madelons Baans; Wilma van Hofwegen; Angela Postma	Sweden; Nelly Jörgensen; Hanna Jaltner; Johanna Sjöberg; Linda Olofsson
1998 Sheffield	Germany; Sandra Völker; Sylvia Gerasch; Franziska van Almsick; Katrin Meissner	Sweden; Therese Alshammar; Maria Östling; Johanna Sjöberg; Anna-Karin Kammerling	Netherlands; Brenda Starink; Madelon Baans; Inge de Bruijn; Angela Postma
1999 Lisbon	Sweden; Therese Alshammar; Emma Igelström; Johanna Sjöberg; Anna-Karin Kammerling	Germany; Sandra Völker; Janne Schäfer; Marietta Uhle; Katrin Meissner	Great Britain; Katy Sexton; Zoë Baker; Nicola Jackson; Sue Rolph
2000 Valencia	Sweden; Therese Alshammar; Emma Igelström; Anna-Karin Kammerling; Johanna Sjöberg	Germany; Daniela Samulski; Sylvia Gerasch; Marletta Uhle; Petra Dallman	Great Britain; Sarah Price; Heidi Earp; Rosalind Brett; Alison Sheppard
2001 Antwerp	Sweden; Therese Alshammar; Emma Igelström; Anna-Karin Kammerling; Johanna Sjöberg	Germany; Janine Pietsch; Janne Schaefer; Catherine Friedrich; Katrin Meissner	Netherlands; Suze Valen; Madelon Baans; Inge de Bruijn; Annabel Kosten
2002 Riesa	Sweden; Jenny Lind; Emma Igelström; Anna-Karin Kammerling; Therese Alshammar	Germany; Janine Pietsch; Sarah Poewe; Nele Hofmann; Antje Buschschulte	Netherlands; Suze Valen; Madelon Baans; Chantal Groot; Marleen Veldhuis
2003 Dublin	Sweden	Germany	Netherlands
2004 Vienna	Netherlands; Hinkelien Schreuder; Moniek Nijhuis; Inge Dekker; Marleen Veldhuis	Germany; Janine Pietsch; Sarah Poewe; Antje Buschschulte; Dorothea Brandt	Sweden; Emelie Kierkegaard; Sanja Dizdarević; Anna-Karin Kammerling; Josefin Lillhage
2005 Trieste	Netherlands; Hinkelien Schreuder; Moniek Nijhuis; Inge Dekker; Marleen Veldhuis	Germany; Janine Pietsch; Janne Schaefer; Daniela Samulski; Dorothea Brandt	Sweden; Therese Alshammar; Rebecca Ejdervik; Anna-Karin Kammerling; Josefin Lillhage
2006 Helsinki	Germany; Janine Pietsch; Janne Schäfer; Antje Buschschulte; Daniela Samulski	Sweden; Therese Alshammar; Rebecca Ejdervik; Anna-Karin Kammerling; Josefin Lillhage	Great Britain; Elizabeth Simmonds; Kate Haywood; Rosalind Brett; Francesca Halsall
2007 Debrecen	Germany; Janine Pietsch; Janne Schäfer; Annika Mehlhorn; Britta Steffen	Sweden; Magdalena Kuras; Hanna Westrin; Anna-Karin Kammerling; Josefin Lillhage	France; Laure Manaudou; Anne-Sophie Le Paranthoën; Alena Popchanka; Malia Metella
2008 Rijeka	Netherlands; Ranomi Kromowidjojo; Moniek Nijhuis; Hinkelien Schreuder; Marleen Veldhuis	Germany; Daniela Samulski; Janne Schaefer; Lena Kalla; Petra Dallmann	Italy; Elena Gemo; Roberta Panara; Silvia di Pietro; Federica Pellegrini
2009 Istanbul	Netherlands; Hinkelien Schreuder; Moniek Nijhuis; Inge Dekker; Ranomi Kromowidjojo	Sweden; Emma Svensson; Josefin Lillhage; Sarah Sjöström; Claire Hedenskog	Russia; Ksenia Moskvina; Daria Deeva; Olga Klyuchnikova; Svetlana Fedulova
2010 Eindhoven	Netherlands; Hinkelien Schreuder; Moniek Nijhuis; Inge Dekker; Ranomi Kromowidjojo	Germany; Jenny Mensing; Dorothea Brandt; Lisa Vitting; Britta Steffen	Italy; Laura Letrari; Lisa Fissneider; Elena Gemo; Federica Pellegrini
2011 Szczecin	Denmark; Mie Nielsen; Rikke Møller Pedersen; Jeanette Ottesen; Pernille Blume	Russia; Anastasia Zuyeva; Valentina Artemyeva; Irina Bespalova; Margarita Nesterova	Poland; Aleksandra Urbanczyk; Ewa Scieszko; Anna Dowgiert; Katarzyna Wilk
2012 Chartres	Denmark; Kristina Thomsen; Rikke Møller Pedersen; Jeanette Ottesen; Pernille Blume	Czech Republic; Simona Baumrtová; Petra Chocová; Lucie Svěcená; Aneta Pechancová	France; Laure Manaudou; Fanny Babou; Mélanie Henique; Anna Santamans
2013 Herning	Russia; Daria Ustinova; Yuliya Yefimova; Svetlana Chimrova; Rozaliya Nasretdinova	Denmark; Mie Nielsen; Rikke Møller Pedersen; Jeanette Ottesen; Pernille Blume	Sweden; Michelle Coleman; Jennie Johansson; Sarah Sjöström; Louise Hansson
2015 Netanya	Netherlands; Tessa Vermeulen; Moniek Nijhuis; Inge Dekker; Ranomi Kromowidjojo	Sweden; Louise Hansson; Sophie Hansson; Sarah Sjöström; Magdalena Kuras	Italy; Elena Gemo; Martina Carraro; Silvia Di Pietro; Erika Ferraioli
2017 Copenhagen	Sweden; Hanna Rosvall; Sophie Hansson; Sarah Sjöström; Michelle Coleman	Denmark; Julie Kepp Jensen; Rikke Møller Pedersen; Emilie Beckmann; Pernille Blume	France; Mathilde Cini; Charlotte Bonnet; Mélanie Henique; Marie Wattel
2019 Glasgow	Poland; Alicja Tchórz; Dominika Sztandera; Kornelia Fiedkiewicz; Katarzyna Wasick	Italy; Silvia Scalia; Benedetta Pilato; Elena Di Liddo; Silvia Di Pietro	Russia; Maria Kameneva; Nika Godun; Arina Surkova; Daria Ustinova
2021 Kazan	Russia; Maria Kameneva; Nika Godun; Arina Surkova; Daria Klepikova	Sweden; Hanna Rosvall; Emelie Fast; Sara Junevik; Sarah Sjöström	Italy; Silvia Scalia; Arianna Castiglioni; Elena Di Liddo; Silvia Di Pietro
2023 Otopeni	Sweden; Louise Hansson; Sophie Hansson; Sara Junevik; Michelle Coleman	Italy; Costanza Cocconcelli; Benedetta Pilato; Silvia Di Pietro; Jasmine Nocentini	Great Britain; Kathleen Dawson; Imogen Clark; Keanna Macinnes; Anna Hopkin
2025 Lublin	Netherlands; Marrit Steenbergen; Tessa Giele; Maaike De Waard; Valerie van Roon	Sweden; Hanna Rosvall; Sophie Hansson; Sara Junevik; Louise Hansson	Italy; Costanza Cocconcelli; Irene Burato; Silvia di Pietro; Sara Curtis

=== 4 × 50 metre mixed freestyle relay ===
Each team consists of two men and two women, in any order.

Year	Gold	Silver	Bronze
2012 Chartres	France; Frédérick Bousquet; Florent Manaudou; Camille Muffat; Anna Santamans	Russia; Andrey Grechin; Vladimir Morozov; Veronika Popova; Rozaliya Nasretdinova	Finland; Hanna-Maria Seppälä; Laura Kurki; Andrei Tuomola; Ari-Pekka Liukkonen
2013 Herning	Russia; Sergey Fesikov; Vladimir Morozov; Rozaliya Nasretdinova; Veronika Popova	Italy; Luca Dotto; Marco Orsi; Silvia Di Pietro; Erika Ferraioli	Netherlands; Inge Dekker; Joost Reijns; Sebastiaan Verschuren; Ranomi Kromowidjojo
2015 Netanya	Italy; Federico Bocchia; Marco Orsi; Silvia Di Pietro; Erika Ferraioli	Russia; Evgeny Sedov; Nikita Konovalov; Natalia Lovtcova; Rozaliya Nasretdinova	Netherlands; Jesse Puts; Ben Schwietert; Inge Dekker; Ranomi Kromowidjojo
2017 Copenhagen	Netherlands; Nyls Korstanje; Kyle Stolk; Ranomi Kromowidjojo; Femke Heemskerk	Russia; Vladimir Morozov; Sergey Fesikov; Maria Kameneva; Rozaliya Nasretdinova	Italy; Luca Dotto; Marco Orsi; Federica Pellegrini; Erika Ferraioli
2019 Glasgow	Russia; Vladimir Morozov; Vladislav Grinev; Arina Surkova; Maria Kameneva	Great Britain; Duncan Scott; Scott McLay; Anna Hopkin; Freya Anderson	France; Maxime Grousset; Florent Manaudou; Melanie Henique; Béryl Gastaldello
2021 Kazan	Netherlands; Jesse Puts; Thom de Boer; Maaike de Waard; Kim Busch	Italy; Alessandro Miressi; Lorenzo Zazzeri; Silvia Di Pietro; Costanza Cocconcelli	Poland; Paweł Juraszek; Jakub Majerski; Alicja Tchórz; Katarzyna Wasick
2023 Otopeni	Great Britain; Ben Proud; Lewis Burras; Anna Hopkin; Freya Anderson	Italy; Alessandro Miressi; Lorenzo Zazzeri; Jasmine Nocentini; Silvia Di Pietro	France; Maxime Grousset; Florent Manaudou; Melanie Henique; Béryl Gastaldello
2025 Lublin	Italy; Leonardo Deplano; Lorenzo Zazzeri; Silvia Di Pietro; Sara Curtis; Giovanni Guatti; Agata Ambler	Hungary; Szebasztián Szabó; Ádám Jászó; Petra Senánszky; Minna Ábrahám; Nándor Németh; Panna Ugrai	Netherlands; Brandon van den Berg; Sean Niewold; Marrit Steenbergen; Valerie van Roon; Kenzo Simons; Tessa Giele; Milou van Wijk

=== 4 × 50 metre mixed medley relay ===
Each team consists of two men and two women, in any order.

Year	Gold	Silver	Bronze
2012 Chartres	France; Jérémy Stravius; Florent Manaudou; Mélanie Henique; Anna Santamans	Slovenia; Anja Čarman; Damir Dugonjič; Peter Mankoč; Nastja Govejšek	Norway; Lavrans Solli; Aleksander Hetland; Monica Johannessen; Cecilie Johannessen
2013 Herning	Germany; Christian Diener; Caroline Ruhnau; Steffen Deibler; Dorothea Brandt	Czech Republic; Simona Baumrtová; Petr Bartůněk; Lucie Svěcená; Tomáš Plevko	Italy; Niccolò Bonacchi; Francesco Di Lecce; Ilaria Bianchi; Erika Ferraioli
2015 Netanya	Italy; Simone Sabbioni; Fabio Scozzoli; Silvia Di Pietro; Erika Ferraioli	Russia; Andrei Shabasov; Andrei Nikolaev; Alina Kashinskaya; Rozaliya Nasretdinova	Belarus; Pavel Sankovich; Ilya Shymanovich; Sviatlana Khakhlova; Aleksandra Gerasimenya
2017 Copenhagen	Netherlands; Kira Toussaint; Arno Kamminga; Joeri Verlinden; Ranomi Kromowidjojo	Belarus; Pavel Sankovich; Ilya Shymanovich; Anastasiya Shkurdai; Yuliya Khitraya	France; Jérémy Stravius; Theo Bussiere; Mélanie Henique; Charlotte Bonnet
2019 Glasgow	Russia; Kliment Kolesnikov; Vladimir Morozov; Arina Surkova; Maria Kameneva	Netherlands; Kira Toussaint; Arno Kamminga; Joeri Verlinden; Femke Heemskerk	Denmark; Mathias Rysgaard; Tobias Bjerg; Jeanette Ottesen; Pernille Blume
2021 Kazan	Netherlands; Kira Toussaint; Arno Kamminga; Maaike de Waard; Thom de Boer	Italy; Michele Lamberti; Nicolò Martinenghi; Elena Di Liddo; Silvia Di Pietro	Russia; Kliment Kolesnikov; Oleg Kostin; Arina Surkova; Maria Kameneva
2023 Otopeni	Italy; Lorenzo Mora; Nicolò Martinenghi; Silvia Di Pietro; Jasmine Nocentini	Russia; Mewen Tomac; Florent Manaudou; Beryl Gastaldello; Charlotte Bonnet	Netherlands; Kira Toussaint; Caspar Corbeau; Tessa Giele; Kenzo Simons
2025 Lublin	Italy; Francesco Lazzari; Simone Cerasuolo; Silvia di Pietro; Sara Curtis; Ludovico Blu Art Viberti; Costanza Cocconcelli; Agata Ambler	Netherlands; Maaike de Waard; Jason van den Berg; Sean Niewold; Valerie van Roon; Marrit Steenbergen	Poland; Aleksander Styś; Jan Kalusowski; Kornelia Fiedkiewicz; Julia Maik; Katarzyna Wasick

== Discontinued events ==
Only at the 1993 European Sprint Swimming Championships in Gateshead, 4 × 50 m relays were held in every stroke.

=== 4 × 50 metre backstroke relay ===
Year	Gold	Silver	Bronze
1993 Gateshead	Germany	Great Britain	None awarded

=== 4 × 50 metre breaststroke relay ===
Year	Gold	Silver	Bronze
1993 Gateshead	Great Britain	Germany	None awarded

=== 4 × 50 metre butterfly relay ===
Year	Gold	Silver	Bronze
1993 Gateshead	Germany	Great Britain	Finland

== See also ==
- List of European Short Course Swimming Championships medalists (men)
