= Swimming at the 1991 European Aquatics Championships =

The swimming events of the 1991 European Aquatics Championships were held in the Olympic Aquatic Centre, Athens, Greece which also hosted the swimming competition during the 2004 Summer Olympics.

== Men's events ==
=== 50 m freestyle ===
| Rank | Name | Country | Time |
|---|---|---|---|
| Gold | Nils Rudolph | (Germany) GER | 22.33 |
| Silver | Gennadiy Prigoda | (Soviet Union) URS | 22.44 |
| Bronze | Mike Fibbens | (United Kingdom) GBR | 22.72 |
| Bronze | Vladimir Tkacenko | (Soviet Union) URS | 22.72 |
| 5 | Christophe Kalfayan | (France) FRA | 22.78 |
| 6 | Silko Günzel | (Germany) GER | 22.91 |
| 7 | Dano Halsall | (Switzerland) SUI | 22.97 |
| 8 | René Gusperti | (Italy) ITA | 23.37 |

=== 100 m freestyle ===
| Rank | Name | Country | Time |
|---|---|---|---|
| Gold | Alexander Popov | (Soviet Union) URS | 49.18 |
| Silver | Nils Rudolph | (Germany) GER | 49.52 |
| Bronze | Giorgio Lamberti | (Italy) ITA | 49.57 |
| 4 | Silko Günzel | (Germany) GER | 49.79 |
| 5 | Venyamin Tayanovich | (Soviet Union) URS | 50.07 |
| 6 | Tommy Werner | (Sweden) SWE | 50.09 |
| 7 | Mike Fibbens | (United Kingdom) GBR | 50.30 |
| 8 | Christophe Kalfayan | (France) FRA | 50.33 |

=== 200 m freestyle ===
| Rank | Name | Country | Time |
|---|---|---|---|
| Gold | Artur Wojdat | (Poland) POL | 1:48.10 |
| Silver | Giorgio Lamberti | (Italy) ITA | 1:48.15 |
| Bronze | Roberto Gleria | (Italy) ITA | 1:48.73 |
| 4 | Yevgeny Sadovyi | (Soviet Union) URS | 1:48.74 |
| 5 | Anders Holmertz | (Sweden) SWE | 1:49.02 |
| 6 | Steffen Zesner | (Germany) GER | 1:49.04 |
| 7 | Antti Kasvio | (Finland) FIN | 1:49.83 |
| 8 | Jarl Inge Melberg | (Norway) NOR | 1:50.07 |

=== 400 m freestyle ===
| Rank | Name | Country | Time |
|---|---|---|---|
| Gold | Yevgeny Sadovyi | (Soviet Union) URS | 3:49.02 |
| Silver | Artur Wojdat | (Poland) POL | 3:49.09 |
| Bronze | Giorgio Lamberti | (Italy) ITA | 3:50.46 |
| 4 | Sebastian Wiese | (Germany) GER | 3:50.49 |
| 5 | Jörg Hoffmann | (Germany) GER | 3:51.42 |
| 6 | Anders Holmertz | (Sweden) SWE | 3:52.08 |
| 7 | Mariusz Podkościelny | (Poland) POL | 3:53.21 |
| 8 | Zoltán Szilágyi | (Hungary) HUN | 3:55.88 |

=== 1500 m freestyle ===
| Rank | Name | Country | Time |
|---|---|---|---|
| Gold | Jörg Hoffmann | (Germany) GER | 15:02.57 |
| Silver | Ian Wilson | (United Kingdom) GBR | 15:02.72 |
| Bronze | Sebastian Wiese | (Germany) GER | 15:14.30 |
| 4 | Igor Majcen | (Socialist Federal Republic of Yugoslavia) YUG | 15:21.58 |
| 5 | Piotr Albinski | (Poland) POL | 15:30.30 |
| 6 | Sergi Rouro | (Spain) ESP | 15:33.44 |
| 7 | Evgeni Logvinov | (Soviet Union) URS | 15:34.30 |
| 8 | Zoltán Szilágyi | (Hungary) HUN | 15:35.27 |

=== 100 m backstroke ===
| Rank | Name | Country | Time |
|---|---|---|---|
| Gold | Martin López-Zubero | (Spain) ESP | 55.30 |
| Silver | Dirk Richter | (Germany) GER | 56.04 |
| Bronze | Franck Schott | (France) FRA | 56.29 |
| 4 | Vladimir Selkov | (Soviet Union) URS | 56.58 |
| 5 | Tamás Deutsch | (Hungary) HUN | 56.59 |
| 6 | Vladimir Shemetov | (Soviet Union) URS | 56.66 |
| 7 | Stefaan Maene | (Belgium) BEL | 57.22 |
| 8 | Attila Czene | (Hungary) HUN | 57.67 |

=== 200 m backstroke ===
| Rank | Name | Country | Time |
|---|---|---|---|
| Gold | Martin López-Zubero | (Spain) ESP | 1:58.66 |
| Silver | Dirk Richter | (Germany) GER | 2:00.18 |
| Silver | Vladimir Selkov | (Soviet Union) URS | 2:00.18 |
| 4 | Tamás Deutsch | (Hungary) HUN | 2:00.30 |
| 5 | David Holderbach | (France) FRA | 2:00.60 |
| 6 | Stefano Battistelli | (Italy) ITA | 2:00.89 |
| 7 | Lars Kalenka | (Germany) GER | 2:01.48 |
| 8 | Thomas Sopp | (Norway) NOR | 2:02.83 |

=== 100 m breaststroke ===
| Rank | Name | Country | Time |
|---|---|---|---|
| Gold | Norbert Rózsa | (Hungary) HUN | 1:01.49 |
| Silver | Adrian Moorhouse | (United Kingdom) GBR | 1:01.89 |
| Bronze | Gianni Minervini | (Italy) ITA | 1:02.41 |
| 4 | Andrea Cecchi | (Italy) ITA | 1:02.58 |
| 5 | Károly Güttler | (Hungary) HUN | 1:02.71 |
| 6 | Petri Suominen | (Finland) FIN | 1:02.90 |
| 7 | Dmitri Volkov | (Soviet Union) URS | 1:03.18 |
| 8 | Frédérik Deburghgraeve | (Belgium) BEL | 1:03.34 |

=== 200 m breaststroke ===
| Rank | Name | Country | Time |
|---|---|---|---|
| Gold | Nick Gillingham | (United Kingdom) GBR | 2:12.55 |
| Silver | Norbert Rózsa | (Hungary) HUN | 2:12.58 |
| Bronze | Sergio López | (Spain) ESP | 2:13.40 |
| 4 | Károly Güttler | (Hungary) HUN | 2:14.07 |
| 5 | Joaquín Fernández | (Spain) ESP | 2:14.40 |
| 6 | Cédric Penicaud | (France) FRA | 2:14.82 |
| 7 | Radek Beinhauer | (Czechoslovakia) TCH | 2:15.59 |
| 8 | Andrea Cecchi | (Italy) ITA | 2:16.29 |

=== 100 m butterfly ===
| Rank | Name | Country | Time |
|---|---|---|---|
| Gold | Vladislav Kulikov | (Soviet Union) URS | 54.22 |
| Silver | Martin López-Zubero | (Spain) ESP | 54.30 |
| Bronze | Nils Rudolph | (Germany) GER | 54.31 |
| 4 | Rafał Szukała | (Poland) POL | 54.35 |
| 5 | Bruno Gutzeit | (France) FRA | 54.92 |
| 6 | Thilo Haase | (Germany) GER | 55.07 |
| 7 | Franck Esposito | (France) FRA | 55.16 |
| 8 | Rik Leishman | (United Kingdom) GBR | 55.26 |

=== 200 m butterfly ===
| Rank | Name | Country | Time |
|---|---|---|---|
| Gold | Franck Esposito | (France) FRA | 1:59.59 |
| Silver | Rafał Szukała | (Poland) POL | 2:01.01 |
| Bronze | Christophe Bordeau | (France) FRA | 2:01.25 |
| 4 | Marco Braida | (Italy) ITA | 2:01.53 |
| 5 | Bernd Zeruhn | (Germany) GER | 2:01.97 |
| 6 | Matiaz Koželi | (Socialist Federal Republic of Yugoslavia) YUG | 2:02.14 |
| 7 | José Luis Ballester | (Spain) ESP | 2:02.32 |
| – | Christian Keller | (Germany) GER | DSQ |

=== 200 m individual medley ===
| Rank | Name | Country | Time |
|---|---|---|---|
| Gold | Lars Sørensen | (Denmark) DEN | 2:02.63 |
| Silver | Christian Gessner | (Germany) GER | 2:02.66 |
| Bronze | Luca Sacchi | (Italy) ITA | 2:02.93 |
| 4 | Christian Keller | (Germany) GER | 2:03.16 |
| 5 | Attila Czene | (Hungary) HUN | 2:03.89 |
| 6 | Frédéric Lefévre | (France) FRA | 2:04.13 |
| 7 | John Davey | (United Kingdom) GBR | 2:05.03 |
| 8. | Jani Sievinen | (Finland) FIN | 2:05.48 |

=== 400 m individual medley ===
| Rank | Name | Country | Time |
|---|---|---|---|
| Gold | Luca Sacchi | (Italy) ITA | 4:17.81 |
| Silver | Patrick Kühl | (Germany) GER | 4:17.85 |
| Bronze | Christian Gessner | (Germany) GER | 4:19.66 |
| 4 | Stefano Battistelli | (Italy) ITA | 4:22.33 |
| 5 | Jani Sievinen | (Finland) FIN | 4:23.34 |
| 6 | Marcin Malinski | (Poland) POL | 4:24.54 |
| 7 | Jorge Perez | (Spain) ESP | 4:24.60 |
| 8. | Denislav Kaltchev | (Bulgaria) BUL | 4:30.99 |

=== 4 × 100 m freestyle relay ===
| Rank | Name | Country | Time |
|---|---|---|---|
| Gold | Pavel Khnykin; Gennadiy Prigoda; Venyamin Tayanovich; Alexander Popov | (Soviet Union) URS | 3:17.11 |
| Silver | Silko Günzel; Nils Rudolph; Steffen Zesner; Dirk Richter | (Germany) GER | 3:18.31 |
| Bronze | Tommy Werner; Göran Titus; Anders Holmertz; Göran Jansson | (Sweden) SWE | 3:20.42 |
| 4 | Italy | (Italy) ITA | 3:20.94 |
| 5 | France | (France) FRA | 3:21.27 |
| 6 | Netherlands | (Netherlands) NED | 3:23.81 |
| 7 | Norway | (Norway) NOR | 3:26.34 |
| 8 | Greece | (Greece) GRE | 3:31.41 |

=== 4 × 200 m freestyle relay ===
| Rank | Name | Country | Time |
|---|---|---|---|
| Gold | Dmitri Lepikov; Vladimir Pyshnenko; Venyamin Tayanovich; Yevgeny Sadovyi | (Soviet Union) URS | 7:15.96 |
| Silver | Emanuele Idini; Roberto Gleria; Stefano Battistelli; Giorgio Lamberti | (Italy) ITA | 7:18.30 |
| Bronze | Steffen Zesner; Uwe Dassler; Christian Keller; Jörg Hoffmann | (Germany) GER | 7:19.13 |
| 4 | Poland | (Poland) POL | 7:25.05 |
| 5 | Spain | (Spain) ESP | 7:27.60 |
| 6 | Norway | (Norway) NOR | 7:28.75 |
| 7 | Great Britain | (United Kingdom) GBR | 7:31.85 |
| – | France | (France) FRA | DSQ |

=== 4 × 100 m medley relay ===
| Rank | Name | Country | Time |
|---|---|---|---|
| Gold | Vladimir Selkov; Dmitri Volkov; Vladislav Kulikov; Alexander Popov | (Soviet Union) URS | 3:39.68 |
| Silver | Franck Schott; Cédric Penicaud; Bruno Gutzeit; Christophe Kalfayan | (France) FRA | 3:42.15 |
| Bronze | Tamás Deutsch; Norbert Rózsa; Péter Horváth; Béla Szabados | (Hungary) HUN | 3:42.35 |
| 4 | Great Britain | (United Kingdom) GBR | 3:43.67 |
| 5 | Spain | (Spain) ESP | 3:45.52 |
| – | Germany | (Germany) GER | DSQ |
| – | Italy | (Italy) ITA | DSQ |
| – | Finland | (Finland) FIN | DSQ |

== Women's events ==
=== 50 m freestyle ===
| Rank | Name | Country | Time |
|---|---|---|---|
| Gold | Simone Osygus | (Germany) GER | 25.80 |
| Silver | Catherine Plewinski | (France) FRA | 25.84 |
| Bronze | Inge de Bruijn | (Netherlands) NED | 25.91 |
| 4 | Daniela Hunger | (Germany) GER | 26.06 |
| 5 | Yevgeniya Yermakova | (Soviet Union) URS | 26.26 |
| 6 | Louise Karlsson | (Sweden) SWE | 26.31 |
| 7 | Gitta Jensen | (Denmark) DEN | 26.32 |
| 8 | Judith Draxler | (Austria) AUT | 26.47 |

=== 100 m freestyle ===
| Rank | Name | Country | Time |
|---|---|---|---|
| Gold | Catherine Plewinski | (France) FRA | 56.20 |
| Silver | Karin Brienesse | (Netherlands) NED | 56.44 |
| Bronze | Simone Osygus | (Germany) GER | 56.47 |
| 4 | Daniela Hunger | (Germany) GER | 56.76 |
| 5 | Gitta Jensen | (Denmark) DEN | 57.20 |
| 6 | Liliana Dobrescu | (Romania) ROM | 57.25 |
| 7 | Louise Karlsson | (Sweden) SWE | 57.46 |
| 8 | Marieke Mastenbroek | (Netherlands) NED | 57.66 |

=== 200 m freestyle ===
| Rank | Name | Country | Time |
|---|---|---|---|
| Gold | Mette Jacobsen | (Denmark) DEN | 2:00.29 |
| Silver | Catherine Plewinski | (France) FRA | 2:00.34 |
| Bronze | Liliana Dobrescu | (Romania) ROM | 2:01.77 |
| 4 | Gitta Jensen | (Denmark) DEN | 2:02.03 |
| 5 | Isabelle Arnould | (Belgium) BEL | 2:02.91 |
| 6 | Eva Nyberg | (Sweden) SWE | 2:03.21 |
| 7 | Sandra Cam | (Belgium) BEL | 2:03.66 |
| 8 | Karin Brienesse | (Netherlands) NED | 2:03.89 |

=== 400 m freestyle ===
| Rank | Name | Country | Time |
|---|---|---|---|
| Gold | Irene Dalby | (Norway) NOR | 4:11.63 |
| Silver | Beatrice Câșlaru | (Romania) ROM | 4:12.33 |
| Bronze | Cristina Sossi | (Italy) ITA | 4:12.35 |
| 4 | Jana Henke | (Germany) GER | 4:12.64 |
| 5 | Isabelle Arnould | (Belgium) BEL | 4:14.24 |
| 6 | Manuela Melchiorri | (Italy) ITA | 4:14.77 |
| 7 | Sandra Cam | (Belgium) BEL | 4:17.06 |
| 8 | Baukje Wiersma | (Netherlands) NED | 4:17.62 |

=== 800 m freestyle ===
| Rank | Name | Country | Time |
|---|---|---|---|
| Gold | Irene Dalby | (Norway) NOR | 8:32.08 |
| Silver | Jana Henke | (Germany) GER | 8:32.25 |
| Bronze | Cristina Sossi | (Italy) ITA | 8:33.79 |
| 4 | Manuela Melchiorri | (Italy) ITA | 8:42.67 |
| 5 | Isabelle Arnould | (Belgium) BEL | 8:44.70 |
| 6 | Olga Spíchalová | (Czechoslovakia) TCH | 8:47.14 |
| 7 | Grit Müller | (Germany) GER | 8:48.19 |
| 8 | Baukje Wiersma | (Netherlands) NED | 8:49.36 |

=== 100 m backstroke ===
| Rank | Name | Country | Time |
|---|---|---|---|
| Gold | Krisztina Egerszegi | (Hungary) HUN | 1:00.31 WR |
| Silver | Tünde Szabó | (Hungary) HUN | 1:01.31 |
| Bronze | Dagmar Hase | (Germany) GER | 1:02.42 |
| 4 | Natalya Krupskaya | (Soviet Union) URS | 1:02.62 |
| 5 | Natalya Shibayeva | (Soviet Union) URS | 1:03.10 |
| 6 | Sandra Völker | (Germany) GER | 1:03.20 |
| 7 | Ellen Elzerman | (Netherlands) NED | 1:03.34 |
| 8 | Sharon Page | (United Kingdom) GBR | 1:03.74 |

=== 200 m backstroke ===
| Rank | Name | Country | Time |
|---|---|---|---|
| Gold | Krisztina Egerszegi | (Hungary) HUN | 2:06.62 WR |
| Silver | Tünde Szabó | (Hungary) HUN | 2:11.42 |
| Bronze | Dagmar Hase | (Germany) GER | 2:12.22 |
| 4 | Natalya Krupskaya | (Soviet Union) URS | 2:13.71 |
| 5 | Joanne Deakins | (United Kingdom) GBR | 2:14.23 |
| 6 | Kathy Read | (United Kingdom) GBR | 2:15.15 |
| 7 | Natalya Shibayeva | (Soviet Union) URS | 2:15.25 |
| 8 | Lorenza Vigarani | (Italy) ITA | 2:15.31 |

=== 100 m breaststroke ===
| Rank | Name | Country | Time |
|---|---|---|---|
| Gold | Elena Roudkovskaya | (Soviet Union) URS | 1:09.05 |
| Silver | Svitlana Bondarenko | (Soviet Union) URS | 1:09.99 |
| Bronze | Tanya Dangalakova | (Bulgaria) BUL | 1:10.12 |
| 4 | Manuela Dalla Valle | (Italy) ITA | 1:10.54 |
| 4 | Gabriella Csépe | (Hungary) HUN | 1:10.54 |
| 6 | Sylvia Gerasch | (Germany) GER | 1:10.62 |
| 7 | Lorriane Coombes | (United Kingdom) GBR | 1:11.52 |
| 8 | Jean Hill | (United Kingdom) GBR | 1:11.56 |

=== 200 m breaststroke ===
| Rank | Name | Country | Time |
|---|---|---|---|
| Gold | Elena Roudkovskaya | (Soviet Union) URS | 2:29.50 |
| Silver | Beatrice Câșlaru | (Romania) ROM | 2:32.00 |
| Bronze | Tanya Dangalakova | (Bulgaria) BUL | 2:32.09 |
| 4 | Alicja Pęczak | (Poland) POL | 2:32.50 |
| 5 | Manuela Dalla Valle | (Italy) ITA | 2:32.52 |
| 6 | Brigitte Becue | (Belgium) BEL | 2:32.88 |
| 7 | Ragnheiður Runólfsdóttir | (Iceland) ISL | 2:34.08 |
| 8 | Audrey Guerit | (France) FRA | 2:34.12 |

=== 100 m butterfly ===
| Rank | Name | Country | Time |
|---|---|---|---|
| Gold | Catherine Plewinski | (France) FRA | 1:00.32 |
| Silver | Inge de Bruijn | (Netherlands) NED | 1:01.64 |
| Bronze | Therèse Lundin | (Sweden) SWE | 1:01.80 |
| 4 | Madeleine Campbell | (United Kingdom) GBR | 1:02.01 |
| 5 | Elena Kononenko | (Soviet Union) URS | 1:02.40 |
| 6 | Katrin Meissner | (Germany) GER | 1:02.65 |
| 7 | Malin Strömberg | (Sweden) SWE | 1:02.80 |
| 8 | Karin Brienesse | (Netherlands) NED | 1:03.16 |

=== 200 m butterfly ===
| Rank | Name | Country | Time |
|---|---|---|---|
| Gold | Mette Jacobsen | (Denmark) DEN | 2:12.87 |
| Silver | Sabine Herbst | (Germany) GER | 2:14.72 |
| Bronze | Berit Puggard | (Denmark) DEN | 2:14.80 |
| 4 | Corina Dumitru | (Romania) ROM | 2:15.55 |
| 5 | María Fernández | (Spain) ESP | 2:16.20 |
| 6 | Juliana Pantillimon | (Romania) ROM | 2:16.71 |
| 7 | Brigitte Becue | (Belgium) BEL | 2:16.78 |
| 8 | Martia Wzodkovska | (Poland) POL | 2:19.40 |

=== 200 m individual medley ===
| Rank | Name | Country | Time |
|---|---|---|---|
| Gold | Daniela Hunger | (Germany) GER | 2:15.15 |
| Silver | Beatrice Câșlaru | (Romania) ROM | 2:16.68 |
| Bronze | Marion Zoller | (Germany) GER | 2:17.43 |
| 4 | Darya Shmeleva | (Soviet Union) URS | 2:17.59 |
| 5 | Brigitte Becue | (Belgium) BEL | 2:18.34 |
| 6 | Ewa Synowska | (Poland) POL | 2:19.77 |
| 7 | Alicja Pęczak | (Poland) POL | 2:19.89 |
| 8 | Lenka Maňhalová | (Czechoslovakia) TCH | 2:20.21 |

=== 400 m individual medley ===
| Rank | Name | Country | Time |
|---|---|---|---|
| Gold | Krisztina Egerszegi | (Hungary) HUN | 4:39.78 |
| Silver | Beatrice Câșlaru | (Romania) ROM | 4:44.67 |
| Bronze | Ewa Synowska | (Poland) POL | 4:47.92 |
| 4 | Sabine Herbst | (Germany) GER | 4:49.85 |
| 5 | Darya Shmeleva | (Soviet Union) URS | 4:50.55 |
| 6 | Irene Dalby | (Norway) NOR | 4:50.68 |
| 7 | Annalisa Nisiro | (Italy) ITA | 4:55.72 |
| – | Céline Bonnet | (France) FRA | DSQ |

=== 4 × 100 m freestyle relay ===
| Rank | Name | Country | Time |
|---|---|---|---|
| Gold | Diana van der Plaats; Inge de Bruijn; Marieke Mastenbroek; Karin Brienesse | (Netherlands) NED | 3:45.36 |
| Silver | Daniela Hunger; Katrin Meissner; Dagmar Hase; Simone Osygus | (Germany) GER | 3:45.54 |
| Bronze | Mette Nielsen; Gitta Jensen; Berit Puggard; Mette Jacobsen | (Denmark) DEN | 3:46.36 |
| 4 | France | (France) FRA | 3:47.95 |
| 5 | Italy | (Italy) ITA | 3:50.14 |
| 6 | Sweden | (Sweden) SWE | 3:50.73 |
| 7 | Great Britain | (United Kingdom) GBR | 3:52.15 |
| 8 | Norway | (Norway) NOR | 3:52.54 |

=== 4 × 200 m freestyle relay ===
| Rank | Name | Country | Time |
|---|---|---|---|
| Gold | Annette Poulsen; Gitta Jensen; Berit Puggard; Mette Jacobsen | (Denmark) DEN | 8:05.90 |
| Silver | Dagmar Hase; Manuela Stellmach; Simone Osygus; Heike Friedrich | (Germany) GER | 8:10.26 |
| Bronze | Ellen Elzerman; Baukje Wiersma; Diana van der Plaats; Karin Brienesse | (Netherlands) NED | 8:13.97 |
| 4 | Italy | (Italy) ITA | 8:19.46 |
| 5 | Romania | (Romania) ROM | 8:19.47 |
| 6 | Sweden | (Sweden) SWE | 8:20.56 |
| 7 | Spain | (Spain) ESP | 8:26.58 |
| 8 | Norway | (Norway) NOR | 8:26.91 |

=== 4 × 100 m medley relay ===
| Rank | Name | Country | Time |
|---|---|---|---|
| Gold | Natalya Krupskaya; Elena Roudkovskaya; Elena Kononenko; Yevgeniya Yermakova | (Soviet Union) URS | 4:08.55 |
| Silver | Dagmar Hase; Sylvia Gerasch; Katrin Meissner; Simone Osygus | (Germany) GER | 4:10.10 |
| Bronze | Ellen Elzerman; Kira Bulten; Inge de Bruijn; Karin Brienesse | (Netherlands) NED | 4:14.03 |
| 4 | Sweden | (Sweden) SWE | 4:16.22 |
| 5 | Italy | (Italy) ITA | 4:17.63 |
| 6 | Denmark | (Denmark) DEN | 4:18.74 |
| 7 | Romania | (Romania) ROM | 4:18.79 |
| – | Great Britain | (United Kingdom) GBR | DSQ |
