= Indrek Sei =

Estonian swimmer

Personal information
- Full name: Indrek Sei
- Nationality: Estonia
- Born: 26 July 1972 (age 53) Tallinn, then part of Estonian SSR, Soviet Union
- Height: 1.88 m (6 ft 2 in)
- Weight: 80 kg (176 lb)

Sport
- Sport: Swimming
- Strokes: Freestyle
- Club: Kalev Tallinn
Medal record
Men's swimming
European Championships (SC)
Silver medal – second place	1993 Gateshead	100m Medley
Silver medal – second place	2000 Valencia	100m Medley
Bronze medal – third place	1991 Gelsenkirchen	100m Medley
Bronze medal – third place	1992 Espoo	100m Medley

Indrek Sei (born 26 July 1972 in Tallinn) is a former freestyle swimmer from Estonia. He competed in three consecutive Summer Olympics for his native country, starting in 1992.

Sei won the bronze medal in the 100m Individual Medley at the European Sprint Swimming Championships 1991 in Gelsenkirchen. A year later in Espoo, Sei repeated that feat.

== See also ==
- List of Estonian records in swimming

Awards
Preceded by Kaido Kaaberma	Estonian Sportsman of the Year; 1993	Succeeded by Ago Markvardt
