= Alen Lončar =

Croatian swimmer (born 1974)

Personal information
- Full name: Alen Lončar
- Nationality: Croatia
- Born: January 21, 1974 (age 52) Rijeka

Sport
- Sport: Swimming
- Strokes: freestyle
Medal record
European Championships (SC)
Bronze medal – third place	1993 Gateshead	4x50 m freestyle
Silver medal – second place	1996 Rostock	4×50 m freestyle

Alen Lončar (born January 21, 1974) is a retired male freestyle swimmer from Croatia, who competed in two consecutive Summer Olympics for his native country, starting in 1996.
