= Simone Osygus =

German swimmer (born 1968)

Personal information
- Full name: Simone Osygus
- Nationality: Germany
- Born: 30 September 1968 (age 57) Wuppertal, North Rhine-Westphalia, West Germany
- Height: 1.80 m (5 ft 11 in)
- Weight: 65 kg (143 lb)

Sport
- Sport: Swimming
- Strokes: Freestyle
- Club: SG Bochum-Wattenscheid
Medal record
Women's swimming
Representing Germany
Olympic Games
Silver medal – second place	1992 Barcelona	4×100 m medley
Silver medal – second place	1996 Atlanta	4×200 m freestyle
Bronze medal – third place	1992 Barcelona	4×100 m freestyle
Bronze medal – third place	1996 Atlanta	4×100 m freestyle
World Championships (LC)
Silver medal – second place	1991 Perth	4×100 m freestyle
Silver medal – second place	1998 Perth	4×100 m freestyle
World Championships (SC)
Silver medal – second place	1997 Gothenburg	4×100 m freestyle
European Championships (LC)
Gold medal – first place	1991 Athens	50 m freestyle
Gold medal – first place	1993 Sheffield	4×200 m freestyle
Gold medal – first place	1995 Vienna	4×100 m freestyle
Gold medal – first place	1997 Seville	4×100 m freestyle
Silver medal – second place	1991 Athens	4×100 m freestyle
Silver medal – second place	1991 Athens	4×200 m freestyle
Silver medal – second place	1991 Athens	4×100 m medley
Bronze medal – third place	1991 Athens	100 m freestyle
European Championships (SC)
Gold medal – first place	1991 Gelsenkirchen	50 m freestyle
Silver medal – second place	1992 Espoo	50 m freestyle

Simone Osygus (born 30 September 1968 in Wuppertal, Nordrhein-Westfalen) is a former freestyle swimmer from Germany, who won two silver medals and two bronze medals at the Summer Olympics. She was also multiple European champion in 50 m freestyle.

== Career ==
Together with Franziska van Almsick, Daniela Hunger and Manuela Stellmach, she won the bronze medal in the 4×100 metres freestyle relay at the 1992 Summer Olympics in Barcelona, Spain. She won also a bronze medal in the same event at the 1996 Summer Olympics in Atlanta, this time with Van Almsick, Sandra Völker and Antje Buschschulte. She also won two silver medals in the 4×200 metres freestyle relay and 4×100 medley relay races, although she swam only in the heats.

== See also ==
- List of German records in swimming
