= Vladimir Predkin =

Russian swimmer

Personal information
- Native name: Владимир Предкин
- Nationality: Russia
- Born: 31 May 1969 (age 57) Leningrad, Russian SFSR, Soviet Union
- Height: 1.89 m (6 ft 2 in)
- Weight: 84 kg (185 lb)

Sport
- Sport: Swimming
- Strokes: Freestyle
- Club: Trud (1987–88) Dynamo (1989–1994) CSKA (1995–1996)
Medal record
Men's swimming
Representing Russia
Olympic Games
Silver medal – second place	1996 Atlanta	4×100 m freestyle
World Championships (LC)
Silver medal – second place	1994 Rome	4×100 m freestyle
World Championships (SC)
Silver medal – second place	1993 Palma	4×100 m freestyle
European Championships (LC)
Gold medal – first place	1993 Sheffield	4×100 m freestyle
Gold medal – first place	1995 Vienna	4×100 m freestyle
European Championships (SC)
Silver medal – second place	1993 Gateshead	50 m freestyle
Bronze medal – third place	1993 Gateshead	50 m butterfly

Vladimir Viktorovich Predkin (Russian: Владимир Викторович Предкин; born 31 May 1969) is a retired Russian swimmer, who won two gold and three silver medals in the 4×100 m freestyle relay at the 1996 Summer Olympics and the European and world championships of 1993–1995. Individually, he won two medals in the 50 m freestyle and 50 m butterfly events at the European Sprint Swimming Championships 1993.

Predkin graduated from the Lesgaft National State University of Physical Education in Saint Petersburg. He is married to Violetta Petruk (Russian: Виолетта Петрук), also a former competitive swimmer; they have a son. Predkin senior is still competing in the masters category.
