= Ron Dekker =

Dutch swimmer (born 1966)

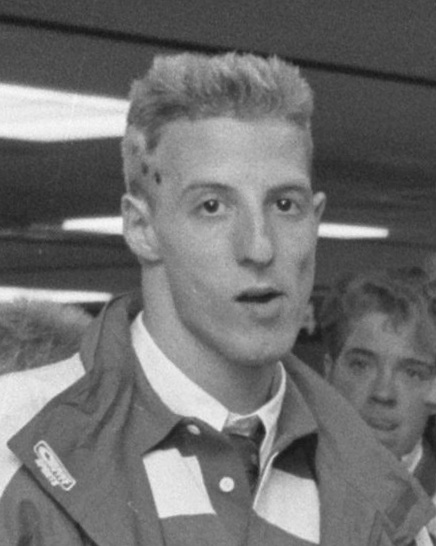
- Dekker in 1988

Personal information
- Full name: Ronald Dekker
- Nationality: Dutch
- Born: 30 June 1966 (age 60) Deventer, Overijssel, Netherlands

Sport
- Sport: Swimming
- Strokes: Breaststroke, individual medley
Medal record
Men's swimming
Representing Netherlands
World Championships (SC)
Silver medal – second place	1993 Palma	100 m breaststroke
European Championships (SC)
Gold medal – first place	1993 Gateshead	100 m medley
Silver medal – second place	1991 Gelsenkirchen	50 m breaststroke
Silver medal – second place	1991 Gelsenkirchen	100 m medley
Silver medal – second place	1992 Espoo	50 m breaststroke
Silver medal – second place	1993 Gateshead	50 m breaststroke
Silver medal – second place	1994 Stavanger	50 m breaststroke

Ronald Dekker (also spelled Decker, born 30 June 1966 in Deventer, Overijssel, Netherlands) is a former breaststroke swimmer from Netherlands. He was a specialist on short course, and won the silver medal in 100m at the 1993 FINA Short Course World Championships in Palma de Mallorca. He swam individual 100m and 200m breaststroke and 4 × 100 m medley and freestyle relays at the 1988 Summer Olympics with the best achievement of 7th place in the relay.
