= Joakim Holmquist =

Swedish swimmer

Personal information
- Born: 15 March 1969 (age 57)

Sport
- Sport: Swimming
Medal record
Representing Sweden
European Championships (LC)
| Bronze medal – third place | 1989 Bonn | 4×100 m freestyle |
European Championships (SC)
| Gold medal – first place | 1993 Gateshead | 50 m freestyle |
| Gold medal – first place | 1993 Gateshead | 4×50 m medley |
| Gold medal – first place | 1993 Gateshead | 4×50 m freestyle |
| Silver medal – second place | 1994 Stavanger | 50 m freestyle |
| Bronze medal – third place | 1991 Gelsenkirchen | 50 m freestyle |

Joakim Holmquist (born 15 March 1969) is a former Swedish Olympic freestyle swimmer. He competed in the 4×100 m freestyle team in the 1988 Summer Olympics finishing 5th.

== Clubs ==
- Jönköpings SS
