= Vasily Ivanov =

Russian swimmer

Personal information
- Born: 8 November 1972 (age 53) Samara, USSR
Medal record
Men's swimming
Representing the Unified Team
Olympic Games
| Silver medal – second place | 1992 Barcelona | 4×100 m medley |
Representing the Soviet Union
European Championships (SC)
| Gold medal – first place | 1991 Gelsenkirchen | 50 m breaststroke |
Representing Russia
European Championships (SC)
| Gold medal – first place | 1992 Espoo | 50 m breaststroke |
| Gold medal – first place | 1993 Gateshead | 50 m breaststroke |
World Championships (LC)
| Silver medal – second place | 1994 Rome | 4×100 m medley |

Vasily Ivanov (Russian: Василий Иванов; born 8 November 1972) is a Russian former swimmer who won silver medals in the 4×100 m medley relay at the 1992 Summer Olympics and 1994 World Aquatics Championships. He also won three gold medals in the 50 m breaststroke at the European Short Course Swimming Championships of 1991–1993. In 1991, he set a world record in the 100 m breaststroke (long course).

Ivanov specialized in sprint disciplines in short-course competitions (25 m pool) due to his massive body structure, which was well adapted to a strong start and fast and powerful turns at the wall. After retirement from swimming in 1994–1995 he worked as a vice-president of the housing company PTS-Servis in Samara. He also played ice hockey for a local team and competed in swimming in the masters category. He is married and has three daughters.
