= Anja Eichhorst =

German swimmer

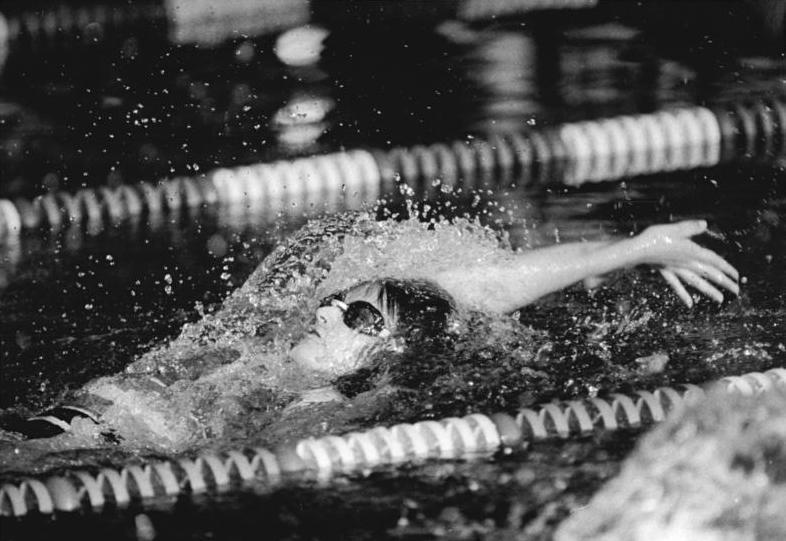
- Eichhorst in 1988

Personal information
- Born: c. 1971 (age 54–55)

Sport
- Sport: Swimming
- Club: SC Empor Rostock
Medal record
Swimming
Representing East Germany
European Championships (LC)
Bronze medal – third place	1989 Bonn	100 m backstroke
Representing Germany
European Championships (SC)
Silver medal – second place	1991 Gelsenkirchen	50 m backstroke
Bronze medal – third place	1992 Espoo	50 m backstroke

Anja Eichhorst (born c. 1971) is a German backstroke swimmer who won three medals at the European championships in 1989, 1991 and 1992.

After retirement from senior swimming she competed in the masters category and won three world titles in backstroke events in 2000.
