= 1993 European Sprint Swimming Championships =

Water sport competitions

- Host city: Gateshead, United Kingdom
- Date(s): 11–13 November

The 1993 European Sprint Swimming Championships were held in Gateshead, United Kingdom, from 11 to 13 November. The championships were organised by the Ligue Européenne de Natation (LEN), with events held in a short course pool.

Only the 50 m individual stroke events, the 100 m individual medley and 4 × 50 m relay events were held at this edition. Backstroke, breaststroke and butterfly relays were held for the first time in a major international championships. Many of Europe's top swimmers did not attend the meet due to the timing of the World Short Course Championships being held less than three weeks after in Palma de Mallorca.

== Medal table ==
* Host nation (Great Britain)

Rank	Nation	Gold	Silver	Bronze	Total
1	Germany (GER)	9	7	7	23
2	Sweden (SWE)	7	4	1	12
3	Great Britain (GBR)*	1	5	3	9
4	Russia (RUS)	1	4	1	6
5	Netherlands (NED)	1	1	0	2
6	Spain (ESP)	1	0	0	1
7	Estonia (EST)	0	1	0	1
8	Croatia (CRO)	0	0	1	1
8	Finland (FIN)	0	0	1	1
Totals (9 entries)		20	22	14	56

== Medalists ==
=== Men's events ===
Event	Gold		Silver		Bronze	
50 m freestyle	Joakim Holmquist (SWE)	22.26	Vladimir Predkin (RUS); Silko Günzel (GER)	22.45	None	
50 m backstroke	Patrick Hermanspann (GER)	25.76	Tino Weber (GER)	25.78	Zsolt Hegmegi (SWE)	25.99
50 m breaststroke	Vassily Ivanov (RUS)	27.82	Ron Dekker (NED)	27.89	Mark Warnecke (GER)	28.03
50 m butterfly	Carlos Sánchez (ESP)	24.04	Jan Karlsson (SWE)	24.19	Vladimir Predkin (RUS)	24.32
100 m individual medley	Ron Dekker (NED)	55.77	Indrek Sei (EST)	56.07	Christian Keller (GER)	56.14
4 × 50 m freestyle relay	Sweden; Christer Wallin; Pär Lindström; Joakim Holmqvist; Zsolt Hegmegi	1:28.80	Germany; Silko Günzel; Axel Hickmann; Torsten Spanneberg; Ingolf Rasch	1:28.88	Croatia; Miloš Milošević; Marijan Kanjer; Alen Loncar; Miroslav Vučetić	1:32.96
4 × 50 m backstroke relay	Germany	1:44.97	Great Britain	1:48.28	None	
4 × 50 m breaststroke relay	Germany	1:55.53	Great Britain	1:58.24	None	
4 × 50 m butterfly relay	Sweden	1:36.53	Germany	1:37.36	Great Britain	1:40.27
4 × 50 m medley relay	Sweden; Zsolt Hegmegi; Peter Haraldsson; Jan Karlsson; Joakim Holmqvist	1:39.54	Russia	1:40.22	Germany; Patrick Hermanspann; Mark Warnecke; Dirk Vandenhirtz; Silko Günzel	1:40.23

=== Women's events ===
Event	Gold		Silver		Bronze	
50 m freestyle	Sandra Völker (GER)	25.55	Linda Olofsson (SWE)	25.56	Annette Hadding (GER)	25.79
50 m backstroke	Sandra Völker (GER)	28.26	Nina Zhivanevskaya (RUS)	28.71	Andrea Kutz (GER)	29.32
50 m breaststroke	Sylvia Gerasch (GER)	31.57	Peggy Hartung (GER); Karen Rake (GBR)	31.89	None	
50 m butterfly	Louise Karlsson (SWE)	27.49	Svetlana Pozdeyeva (RUS)	27.88	Julia Voitowitsch (GER)	27.91
100 m individual medley	Louise Karlsson (SWE)	1:01.45	Ulrika Jardfelt (SWE)	1:02.74	Sylvia Gerasch (GER)	1:03.12
4 × 50 m freestyle relay	Sweden; Ellenor Svensson; Linda Olofsson; Louise Karlsson; Susanne Lööv	1:41.27	Germany; Sandra Völker; Annette Hadding; Silvia Stahl; Anke Scholz	1:43.08	Great Britain	1:46.04
4 × 50 m backstroke relay	Germany	2:01.15	Great Britain	2:02.45	None	
4 × 50 m breaststroke relay	Great Britain	2:11.28	Germany	2:11.34	None	
4 × 50 m butterfly relay	Germany	1:53.06	Great Britain	1:55.62	Finland	1:57.17
4 × 50 m medley relay	Germany; Sandra Volker; Sylvia Gerasch; Julia Voitowitsch; Annette Hadding	1:53.26	Sweden; Ulrika Jardfeldt; Hanna Jaltner; Louise Karlsson; Linda Olofsson	1:53.74	Great Britain	1:57.13
