= Sharon Page =

English swimmer

Personal information
- Born: 27 June 1971 (age 55) Gorleston-on-Sea, Norfolk, England

Sport
- Sport: Swimming

Sharon Louise Page (born 27 June 1971) is a female English former swimmer.

== Swimming career ==
Page represented Great Britain in the women's 100 metres backstroke at the 1988 Seoul Olympics. At the ASA National British Championships she won the 100 metres backstroke title in 1990.

== International competitions ==
Year	Competition	Venue	Position	Event	Notes
1988	Olympic Games	Seoul, South Korea	18th	100 m backstroke	1:04.75
1991	World Championships	Perth, Australia	9th	100 m backstroke	1:03.97
1991	World Championships	Perth, Australia	5th	4 × 100 m medley	4:13.90
1991	European Championships	Athens, Greece	8th	100 m backstroke	1:03.74
