= Adrian O'Connor =

Irish swimmer

Personal information
- Full name: Adrian O'Connor
- Nationality: Ireland
- Born: 11 January 1972 (age 54) New Ross, Wexford, Ireland

Sport
- Sport: Swimming
- Strokes: Backstroke

Adrian O'Connor (born 11 January 1972) is a retired male backstroke swimmer from Ireland.

He won the 50 metres backstroke at the 1991 FINA Swimming World Cup in Sheffield. He won also medals at the FINA Swimming World Cup in 1994 and 1996.

He competed for his native country at the 1996 Summer Olympics in Atlanta, Georgia, where he did not qualify for the final in his two individual starts (100m and 200m backstroke). He held the Irish men's 200 m backstroke record from 1996 to 2009.

He was born in New Ross, Wexford, his brother Hugh also represented Ireland in swimming, also in the backstroke events.

He represented his nation also at other main swimming tournaments throughout the 1990s, including at the 1993 FINA World Swimming Championships (25 m), 1997 European Aquatics Championships and 1998 World Aquatics Championships.
