= Louise Karlsson =

Swedish swimmer

Personal information
- Born: 26 April 1974 (age 52)
Medal record
Women's swimming
World Championships (SC)
Gold medal – first place	1997 Gothenburg	200 m medley
Bronze medal – third place	1995 Rio de Janeiro	200 m medley
Bronze medal – third place	1995 Rio de Janeiro	4×100 m freestyle
Bronze medal – third place	1997 Gothenburg	4×100 m freestyle
European Championships (LC)
Silver medal – second place	1995 Vienna	4×100 m freestyle
European Championships (SC)
Gold medal – first place	1991 Gelsenkirchen	100 m medley
Gold medal – first place	1992 Espoo	50 m breaststroke
Gold medal – first place	1992 Espoo	50 m butterfly
Gold medal – first place	1992 Espoo	100 m medley
Gold medal – first place	1993 Gateshead	50 m butterfly
Gold medal – first place	1993 Gateshead	100 m medley
Gold medal – first place	1993 Gateshead	4×50 m freestyle
Gold medal – first place	1994 Stavanger	100 m medley
Silver medal – second place	1991 Gelsenkirchen	50 m butterfly
Silver medal – second place	1992 Espoo	4×50 m medley
Silver medal – second place	1992 Espoo	4×50 m freestyle
Silver medal – second place	1993 Gateshead	4×50 m medley
Silver medal – second place	1994 Stavanger	4×50 m freestyle
Bronze medal – third place	1991 Gelsenkirchen	50 m freestyle
Bronze medal – third place	1994 Stavanger	4×50 m medley

Louise Karlsson (born 26 April 1974) is a former Swedish breaststroke and medley swimmer who competed in the 1992 and 1996 Summer Olympics. She finished 8th on 200 m medley in the 1996 Summer Olympics. She also held the world record on 100 m medley for about one year, with the time 1:01.03 in January 1997.

== Clubs ==
- Skärets SS
- Helsingborgs SS

Records
Preceded by Incumbent	Women's 100 metre individual medley world record holder (short course); January 26, 1997 – February 26, 1998	Succeeded by (China) Xiaowen Hu
