= 1994 European Sprint Swimming Championships =

Water sport competitions

1994 European Short Course Swimming Championships
- Host city: Stavanger, Norway
- Date(s): 3–4 December

The fourth edition of what later would be the European Short Course Championships was held in Stavanger, Norway, from 3 December to 4 December 1994. The event was named the European Sprint Swimming Championships. Only the 50 m events and the 100 m individual medley were at stake.

== Medal table ==
* Host nation (Norway)

Rank	Nation	Gold	Silver	Bronze	Total
1	Germany (GER)	7	2	4	13
2	Sweden (SWE)	4	4	1	9
3	Netherlands (NED)	1	2	1	4
4	Poland (POL)	1	1	0	2
5	Bulgaria (BUL)	1	0	0	1
6	Russia (RUS)	0	1	2	3
6	Slovakia (SVK)	0	1	2	3
8	Great Britain (GBR)	0	1	1	2
8	Norway (NOR)*	0	1	1	2
10	Spain (ESP)	0	1	0	1
11	Croatia (CRO)	0	0	2	2
Totals (11 entries)		14	14	14	42

== Medal summary ==
=== Men's events ===
Games	Gold		Silver		Bronze	
50 m freestyle	Krzysztof Cwalina; Poland	22.01	Joakim Holmqvist; Sweden	22.50	Silko Günzel; Germany	22.53
50 m backstroke	Jirka Letzin; Germany	25.47	Zsolt Hegmegi; Sweden	25.72	Miloslav Dolnik; Slovakia	25.93
50 m breaststroke	Mark Warnecke; Germany	27.58	Ron Dekker; Netherlands	27.61	Dmitri Volkov; Russia	27.95
50 m butterfly	Jonas Åkesson; Sweden	24.25	Carlos Sanchez; Spain	24.34	Dirk Vandenhirtz; Germany	24.55
100 m individual medley	Denislav Kaltchev; Bulgaria	55.51	Christian Keller; Germany	55.88	Grigory Matuskov; Russia	57.31
4 × 50 m freestyle relay	Sweden; Sweden	1:27.62; ER	Germany; Germany	1:29.09	Croatia; Croatia	1:30.71
4 × 50 m medley relay	Germany; Germany	1:38.01; ER	Sweden; Sweden	1:39.38	Croatia; Croatia	1:41.19

=== Women's events ===
Games	Gold		Silver		Bronze	
50 m freestyle	Sandra Völker; Germany	25.29	Angela Postma; Netherlands	25.52	Sue Rolph; Great Britain	25.55
50 m backstroke	Sandra Völker; Germany	27.96	Dagmara Komorowicz; Poland	28.85	Martina Moravcová; Slovakia	28.86
50 m breaststroke	Emma Igelström; Sweden	32.13	Elin Austevoll; Norway	32.14	Terrie Miller; Norway	32.43
50 m butterfly	Angela Postma; Netherlands	27.48	Martina Moravcová; Slovakia	27.84	Julia Voitowitsch; Germany	27.92
100 m individual medley	Louise Karlsson; Sweden	1:01.89	Sue Rolph; Great Britain	1:02.21	Daniela Hunger; Germany	1:02.48
4 × 50 m freestyle relay	Germany	1:41.20	Sweden	1:42.32	Netherlands	1:42.45
4 × 50 m medley relay	Germany	1:53.58	Russia	1:54.21	Sweden	1:54.51
