= 1992 European Sprint Swimming Championships =

Water sport competitions

- Host city: Espoo, Finland
- Date(s): 21–22 December

The 1992 LEN European Sprint Swimming Championships were the second edition of what later became the European Short Course Championships. It was held in Espoo, Finland from 21–22 December 1992, and was organised by the Ligue Européenne de Natation. Only the 50 m events and the 100 m individual medley were at stake.

== Medal table ==
Rank	Nation	Gold	Silver	Bronze	Total
1	Germany (GER)	4	7	4	15
2	Sweden (SWE)	4	3	0	7
3	Finland (FIN)	3	1	0	4
4	Russia (RUS)	1	1	5	7
5	Great Britain (GBR)	1	0	1	2
6	Ukraine (UKR)	1	0	0	1
7	Netherlands (NED)	0	2	0	2
8	Poland (POL)	0	0	2	2
9	Croatia (CRO)	0	0	1	1
9	Estonia (EST)	0	0	1	1
Totals (10 entries)		14	14	14	42

== Results summary ==
=== Men's events ===
Event	Gold		Silver		Bronze	
50 m freestyle	Yuriy Vlasov (UKR)	22.06	Mark Pinger (GER)	22.32	Mark Foster (GBR)	22.38
50 m backstroke	Jani Sievinen (FIN)	25.07	Rudi Dollmayer (SWE)	25.53	Patrick Hermanspann (GER)	25.62
50 m breaststroke	Vassily Ivanov (RUS)	27.25	Ron Dekker (NED)	27.67	Dmitri Volkov (RUS)	27.89
50 m butterfly	Mark Foster (GBR)	23.89	Dirk Vandenhirtz (GER)	24.31	Miloš Milošević (CRO)	24.49
100 m individual medley	Jani Sievinen (FIN)	53.78	Antti Kasvio (FIN)	54.93	Indrek Sei (EST)	55.85
4 × 50 m freestyle relay	Sweden	1:27.94	Germany	1:28.14	Russia	1:29.99
4 × 50 m medley relay	Finland	1:38.10	Sweden	1:38.16	Russia	1:38.59

=== Women's events ===
Event	Gold		Silver		Bronze	
50 m freestyle	Franziska van Almsick (GER)	24.95	Simone Osygus (GER)	25.42	Annette Hadding (GER)	25.75
50 m backstroke	Sandra Völker (GER)	28.57	Nina Zhivanevskaya (RUS)	28.66	Anja Eichhorst (GER)	28.95
50 m breaststroke	Louise Karlsson (SWE)	31.19 ER	Peggy Hartung (GER)	31.55	Alicja Pęczak (POL)	31.73
50 m butterfly	Louise Karlsson (SWE)	27.28	Inge de Bruijn (NED)	27.57	Susanne Müller (GER)	27.80
100 m individual medley	Louise Karlsson (SWE)	1:01.03 ER	Daniela Hunger (GER)	1:01.95	Alicja Pęczak (POL)	1:02.76
4 × 50 m freestyle relay	Germany	1:40.63	Sweden	1:41.65	Russia	1:43.73
4 × 50 m medley relay	Germany	1:52.44	Sweden	1:52.60	Russia	1:55.97
