= Elin Austevoll =

Norwegian swimmer (born 1974)

Personal information
- Nationality: Norway
- Born: 21 September 1974 (age 51) Bergen, Hordaland
- Height: 1.77 m (5 ft 10 in)
- Weight: 73 kg (161 lb)

Sport
- Sport: Swimming
- Strokes: Breaststroke
- Club: Svømmeklubb Hansasvømmerne
- College team: Stanford University
Medal record
Representing Norway
Women's swimming
European Championships (SC)
Silver medal – second place	1994 Stavanger	50 m breaststroke

Elin Austevoll (born 21 September 1974) is a Norwegian swimmer, born in Bergen.

She competed at the European Sprint Swimming Championships 1994, where she won a silver medal in 50 m breaststroke.

She participated at the 1996 Summer Olympics, where finishing 12th in 100 m breaststroke was her best result.

Competed at the 1997 FINA Short Course World Championships, and finished 15th in 100 m breaststroke and 14th in 200 m breaststroke.

Competed at the 1999 FINA Short Course World Championships, and finished 6th in 200 m breaststroke.

Competed at the 2000 European Short Course World Championships, and finished 4th in the 100m breaststroke.

She was part of the Stanford Women's Swim team that won the NCAA team titles in 1996 and 1998
Elin Austevoll has a bachelor's degree in economics from Stanford University (1995–1999) and a Master of International Business from NHH (2003–2005) and is currently Controller in Statoil ASA.
