= Elena Kononenko =

Ukrainian swimmer

Sport
- Sport: Swimming
Medal record
Representing Soviet Union
European Championships
Gold medal – first place	1991 Athens	4×100 m medley

Elena Kononenko (Russian: Елена Кононенко) is a retired Ukrainian swimmer who won a gold medal in the 4×100 m medley relay at the 1991 European Aquatics Championships. The same year she won a national title in the 100 m butterfly event.
