= Silko Günzel =

German swimmer

Personal information
- Born: 2 June 1971 (age 55)

Sport
- Sport: Swimming
- Club: SC Dynamo Berlin, SSF Bonn
Medal record
Representing Germany
European Championships (SC)
Gold medal – first place	1991 Gelsenkirchen	4×50 m freestyle
Gold medal – first place	1994 Stavanger	4×50 m medley
Silver medal – second place	1991 Gelsenkirchen	50 m freestyle
Silver medal – second place	1993 Gateshead	50 m freestyle
Silver medal – second place	1993 Gateshead	4×50 m freestyle
Silver medal – second place	1994 Stavanger	4×50 m freestyle
Bronze medal – third place	1993 Gateshead	4×50 m medley
Bronze medal – third place	1994 Stavanger	50 m freestyle

Silko Günzel (born 2 June 1971) is a retired German freestyle swimmer who specialized in short course (25 m pool) sprint swimming disciplines, in which he won eight European medals between 1991 and 1994.

He originates from East Germany. After retiring from swimming in 1996 he worked as a software developer and doctor in physiotherapy and health care related fields. Between 2000 and 2010, he founded three medical consulting companies: Airnergy AG, Medical Biophysics GmbH and Günzel Medical Consulting & Development UG.

== Publications ==
- Silko Günzel "Apparatus and process for the generation of fluid activated by singlet oxygen", US Patent 20090202399, Filing date: March 17, 2007
