= Natalya Krupskaya =

Russian swimmer (born 1972)

Personal information
- Born: 1972 (age 53–54) Novokuznetsk, Russian SFSR, Soviet Union

Sport
- Sport: Swimming
Medal record
Representing Soviet Union
European Championships
Gold medal – first place	1991 Athens	4×100 m medley

Natalya Krupskaya (Russian: Наталья Крупская; born 1972) is a retired Russian swimmer who won a gold medal in the 4×100 m medley relay at the 1991 European Aquatics Championships. During her career she won three national titles (1988, 1989 and 1991) and set one national record (1991) in the 200 m backstroke.

She started swimming in 1980 and by 1987 was a member of the Soviet team. After retirement she worked as a swimming coach in her native Novokuznetsk.
