= 1991 European Sprint Swimming Championships =

Water sport competitions

- Host city: Gelsenkirchen, Germany
- Date(s): 6–8 December

The 1991 LEN European Sprint Swimming Championships were the first edition of what later would become the European Short Course Championships. It was held in Gelsenkirchen, Germany from 6–8 December 1991, and was organised by the Ligue Européenne de Natation. Only the 50 m events of each stroke, 100 m individual medley and 4 × 50 m relay events were at stake at this inaugural edition.

== Medal table ==
Rank	Nation	Gold	Silver	Bronze	Total
1	Germany (GER)	7	7	5	19
2	Soviet Union (URS)	3	2	2	7
3	Sweden (SWE)	2	1	2	5
4	Netherlands (NED)	1	2	0	3
5	Finland (FIN)	1	0	0	1
6	Italy (ITA)	0	2	2	4
7	Great Britain (GBR)	0	0	2	2
8	Estonia (EST)	0	0	1	1
Totals (8 entries)		14	14	14	42

== Results summary ==
=== Men's events ===
Event	Gold		Silver		Bronze	
50 m freestyle	Alexander Popov (URS)	22.16	Silko Günzel (GER)	22.25	Joakim Holmquist (SWE)	22.32
50 m backstroke	Jani Sievinen (FIN)	25.18	Vladimir Selkov (URS)	25.68	Jens Bünger (GER)	25.83
50 m breaststroke	Vassily Ivanov (URS)	27.38	Ron Dekker (NED)	27.42	Gianni Minervini (ITA)	27.51
50 m butterfly	Jan Karlsson (SWE)	24.32	Nils Rudolph (GER)	24.46	Vladislav Kulikov (URS)	24.52
100 m individual medley	Josef Hladký (GER)	55.28	Ron Dekker (NED)	55.45	Indrek Sei (EST)	55.83
4 × 50 m freestyle relay	Germany	1:28.27	Soviet Union	1:29.39	Great Britain	1:31.58
4 × 50 m medley relay	Soviet Union	1:38.87	Germany	1:39.05	Italy	1:39.84

=== Women's events ===
Event	Gold		Silver		Bronze	
50 m freestyle	Simone Osygus (GER)	25.04	Daniela Hunger (GER)	25.49	Louise Karlsson (SWE)	25.76
50 m backstroke	Sandra Völker (GER)	28.59	Anja Eichhorst (GER)	28.77	Andrea Kutz (GER)	29.12
50 m breaststroke	Peggy Hartung (GER)	31.61	Sylvia Gerasch (GER)	31.87	Jana Dörries (GER)	32.25
50 m butterfly	Inge de Bruijn (NED)	27.25	Louise Karlsson (SWE)	27.63	Christiane Sievert (GER)	28.02
100 m individual medley	Louise Karlsson (SWE)	1:01.61	Daniela Hunger (GER)	1:02.23	Marion Zoller (GER)	1:02.36
4 × 50 m freestyle relay	Germany	1:41.30	Italy	1:44.26	Soviet Union	1:44.73
4 × 50 m medley relay	Germany	1:53.13	Italy	1:55.84	Great Britain	1:56.19
