= Sandra Völker =

German swimmer (born 1974)

Personal information
- Full name: Sandra Völker
- Nationality: Germany
- Born: 1 April 1974 (age 52) Lübeck, Schleswig-Holstein, West Germany
- Height: 1.80 m (5 ft 11 in)

Sport
- Sport: Swimming
- Strokes: Freestyle, butterfly and backstroke
- Club: Sport Gemeinschaft Hamburg
Medal record
Women's swimming
Representing Germany
Olympic Games
Silver medal – second place	1996 Atlanta	100 m freestyle
Bronze medal – third place	1996 Atlanta	50 m freestyle
Bronze medal – third place	1996 Atlanta	4×100 m freestyle
World Championships (LC)
Gold medal – first place	2001 Fukuoka	4×100 m freestyle
Silver medal – second place	1998 Perth	50 m freestyle
Silver medal – second place	1998 Perth	4×100 m freestyle
Silver medal – second place	2003 Barcelona	4×100 m freestyle
Bronze medal – third place	1998 Perth	100 m backstroke
Bronze medal – third place	2001 Fukuoka	50 m freestyle
Bronze medal – third place	2001 Fukuoka	100 m freestyle
World Championships (SC)
Gold medal – first place	1997 Gothenburg	50 m freestyle
Gold medal – first place	1999 Hong Kong	50 m backstroke
Gold medal – first place	2000 Athens	100 m backstroke
Silver medal – second place	1997 Gothenburg	100 m freestyle
Silver medal – second place	1997 Gothenburg	4×100 m freestyle
Silver medal – second place	1999 Hong Kong	100 m freestyle
Silver medal – second place	2000 Athens	50 m freestyle
Silver medal – second place	2000 Athens	4×100 m medley
Bronze medal – third place	1995 Rio	50 m freestyle
Bronze medal – third place	1995 Rio	100 m freestyle
European Championships (LC)
Gold medal – first place	1993 Sheffield	4×100 m medley
Gold medal – first place	1997 Seville	100 m freestyle
Gold medal – first place	1997 Seville	4×100 m freestyle
Gold medal – first place	1997 Seville	4×100 m medley
Gold medal – first place	1999 Istanbul	50 m backstroke
Gold medal – first place	1999 Istanbul	100 m backstroke
Gold medal – first place	1999 Istanbul	4×100 m freestyle
Gold medal – first place	2002 Berlin	4×100 m freestyle
Gold medal – first place	2002 Berlin	4×100 m medley
Silver medal – second place	1997 Seville	50 m freestyle
Silver medal – second place	1999 Istanbul	4×100 m medley
Silver medal – second place	2002 Berlin	50 m backstroke
Silver medal – second place	2002 Berlin	100 m backstroke
Bronze medal – third place	1993 Sheffield	100 m backstroke
Bronze medal – third place	1997 Seville	50 m backstroke
Bronze medal – third place	1999 Istanbul	100 m freestyle
Bronze medal – third place	2004 Madrid	50 m freestyle
European Championships (SC)
Gold medal – first place	1991 Gelsenkirchen	50 m backstroke
Gold medal – first place	1991 Gelsenkirchen	4×50 m medley
Gold medal – first place	1992 Espoo	50 m backstroke
Gold medal – first place	1992 Espoo	4×50 m medley
Gold medal – first place	1993 Gateshead	50 m freestyle
Gold medal – first place	1993 Gateshead	50 m backstroke
Gold medal – first place	1993 Gateshead	4×50 m medley
Gold medal – first place	1994 Stavanger	50 m freestyle
Gold medal – first place	1994 Stavanger	50 m backstroke
Gold medal – first place	1994 Stavanger	4×50 m freestyle
Gold medal – first place	1994 Stavanger	4×50 m medley
Gold medal – first place	1996 Rostock	50 m freestyle
Gold medal – first place	1996 Rostock	100 m freestyle
Gold medal – first place	1996 Rostock	50 m backstroke
Gold medal – first place	1996 Rostock	4×50 m freestyle
Gold medal – first place	1996 Rostock	4×50 m medley
Gold medal – first place	1998 Sheffield	50 m backstroke
Gold medal – first place	1998 Sheffield	100 m backstroke
Gold medal – first place	1998 Sheffield	4×50 m freestyle
Gold medal – first place	1998 Sheffield	4×50 m medley
Gold medal – first place	1999 Lisbon	50 m backstroke
Silver medal – second place	1993 Gateshead	4×50 m freestyle
Silver medal – second place	1996 Rostock	50 m butterfly
Silver medal – second place	1996 Rostock	100 m butterfly
Silver medal – second place	1999 Lisbon	4×50 m freestyle
Silver medal – second place	2003 Dublin	4×50 m medley
Bronze medal – third place	1999 Lisbon	100 m freestyle
Bronze medal – third place	2003 Dublin	4×50 m freestyle

Sandra Völker (born 1 April 1974) is a retired freestyle and backstroke swimmer from Germany, former world record holder in 50 metres backstroke. She was also multiple World and European champion, in both Long and Short Course Championships.

== Olympic career ==
Völker won three (one silver, two bronze) medals at the 1996 Summer Olympics in Atlanta, United States. This was her second Olympic appearance. Völker competed in four Olympics, making her debut in Barcelona, Spain in 1992.

== Private life ==
During Völker's preparation for the 2000 Summer Olympics, she was diagnosed as having asthma, and a year later established a stiftung (foundation) for children with asthma and allergies. Völker's autobiography was published in 2015.

== See also ==
- Personal homepage
- Profile on FINA-website
- World record progression 50 metres backstroke

== Bibliography ==
- Völker, Sandra (2015). An Land kannst du nicht schwimmen. Orell Füssli Verlag, 248 pages. ISBN 3-280-05579-2.
