= Daniela Hunger =

German swimmer (born 1972)

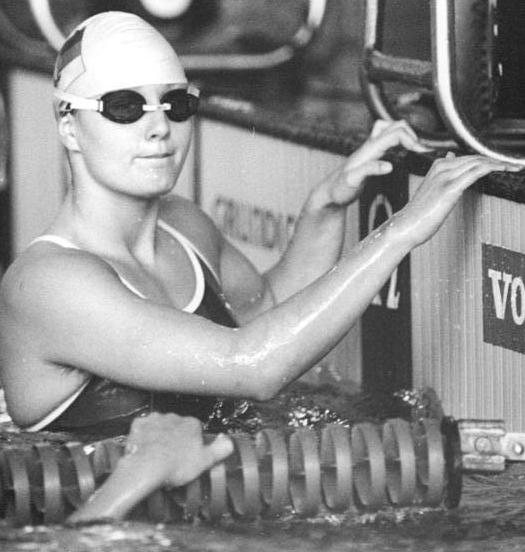
- Daniela Hunger in 1990

Personal information
- Nationality: East Germany (until 1990); Germany
- Born: 20 March 1972 (age 54) East Berlin, East Germany
- Height: 1.75 m (5 ft 9 in)
- Weight: 63 kg (139 lb)

Sport
- Sport: Swimming
- Strokes: Medley; Freestyle
- Club: SC Dynamo Berlin; SV Preußen Berlin
Medal record
Women's swimming
Representing East Germany
Olympic Games
Gold medal – first place	1988 Seoul	200 m medley
Gold medal – first place	1988 Seoul	4×100 m freestyle
Bronze medal – third place	1988 Seoul	400 m medley
Representing Germany
Silver medal – second place	1992 Barcelona	4×100 m medley
Bronze medal – third place	1992 Barcelona	200 m medley
Bronze medal – third place	1992 Barcelona	4×100 m freestyle
World Championships (LC)
Silver medal – second place	1991 Perth	4×100 m freestyle
Bronze medal – third place	1991 Perth	200 m medley
Bronze medal – third place	1994 Rome	4×100 m freestyle
European Championships (LC)
Representing East Germany
Gold medal – first place	1989 Bonn	200 m medley
Gold medal – first place	1989 Bonn	400 m medley
Gold medal – first place	1989 Bonn	4×100 m freestyle
Silver medal – second place	1987 Strasbourg	200 m medley
Silver medal – second place	1989 Bonn	50 m freestyle
Representing Germany
Gold medal – first place	1991 Athens	200 m medley
Gold medal – first place	1993 Sheffield	200 m medley
Gold medal – first place	1993 Sheffield	4×100 m freestyle
Gold medal – first place	1995 Vienna	4×100 m freestyle
Silver medal – second place	1991 Athens	4×100 m freestyle
European Championships (SC)
Gold medal – first place	1991 Gelsenkirchen	4x50 m freestyle
Gold medal – first place	1991 Gelsenkirchen	4x50 m medley
Gold medal – first place	1992 Espoo	4x50 m freestyle
Gold medal – first place	1994 Stavanger	4x50 m freestyle
Gold medal – first place	1994 Stavanger	4x50 m medley
Silver medal – second place	1991 Gelsenkirchen	50 m freestyle
Silver medal – second place	1991 Gelsenkirchen	100 m medley
Silver medal – second place	1992 Espoo	100 m medley
Bronze medal – third place	1994 Stavanger	100 m medley

Daniela Hunger (born 20 March 1972 in East Berlin) is a former medley and freestyle swimmer from East Germany, who became two times Olympic champion at the 1988 Summer Olympics in Seoul, South Korea: in the women's 200 m individual medley, and as a member of the women's 4×100 m freestyle team.

== Career ==
Hunger also competed at the 1992 Summer Olympics in Barcelona, Spain, where she captured three medals. She competed for SC Dynamo Berlin. including Silver in 4x100 m Medley Relay with participation of Dagmar Hase, Jana Dörries, Franziska van Almsick, Daniela Hunger.

In 1998, several former East German swimmers have gone public with accusations against their coaches and physicians that they were systematically doped, Daniela Hunger being one of them.

== See also ==
- List of European Aquatics Championships medalists in swimming (women)
