= Marion Zoller =

German swimmer

Personal information
- Born: 8 January 1968 (age 58) Munich, West Germany
- Height: 1.66 m (5 ft 5 in)
- Weight: 64 kg (141 lb)

Sport
- Sport: Swimming
- Club: Schwimmverein Schwäbisch Gmünd
Medal record
Women's swimming
Representing Germany
European Championships
| Bronze medal – third place | 1991 Athens | 200 m medley |

Marion Zoller (born 8 January 1968) is a retired German swimmer who won a bronze medal at the 1991 European Aquatics Championships in 200 m medley.

== Career ==
Zoller started swimming in a club at age 9. She studied business administration at the University of Tübingen. She also competed in the 200 m backstroke at the 1992 Summer Olympics, but was eliminated in preliminaries.
