= Julia Voitovitsch =

German swimmer

Personal information
- Born: 8 December 1976 (age 49) Kyiv, Ukrainian SSR, Soviet Union

Sport
- Sport: Swimming

Julia Voitovitsch (born 8 December 1976) is a German swimmer. She competed in the women's 100 metre butterfly event at the 1996 Summer Olympics.
