= Annette Hadding =

German swimmer

Olympic medal record

Women's Swimming

Representing Germany
Bronze medal – third place	1992 Barcelona	4x100 m freestyle relay

Annette Hadding (born 3 December 1975) is a German former swimmer who competed in the 1992 Summer Olympics.
