= European Short Course Swimming Championships =

International short-course swimming competitions

European Aquatics Short Course Swimming Championships
- Status: Active
- Genre: Sports event
- Date: December
- Frequency: Annual (until 2013) Biennial (since 2013)
- Location: Various
- Inaugurated: 1991
- Most recent: Lublin 2025
- Previous event: Otopeni 2023
- Next event: 2027
- Organiser: European Aquatics (LEN)

The European Aquatics Short Course Swimming Championships, (often referred to informally as Short Course Europeans) are the continental swimming championships, organized by LEN for short course swimming in Europe. The meet features swimmers from Europe, competing in events in a short course (25-meter) pool and features some of the highest standard of 25m racing in the world. It is the sister competition to the European Aquatics Long Course (50m) Championships. The meet has traditionally been held in the beginning of December. Annual until 2013, the event now occurs in odd years.

== History ==
The championships were first held in 1996, and were preceded by the "European Sprint Swimming Championships" which were held from 1991 to 1994. The Sprint meet featured 14 events: the 50 metres of the strokes, the 100 metres individual medley, and 4 × 50 metres relays (freestyle and medley).

In 1996, the meet expanded to 38 events, adding the 100 metres and 200 metres of each stroke, the 400 metres, the men's 1500 metres freestyle and women's 800 metres freestyle events, and the 200 and 400 metres individual medley events; and the name was changed from "Sprint" to "Short Course". LEN also started numbering the championships again, such that 2011's meet was the 15th edition.

In 2012, the meet expanded to 40 events: 19 for men, 19 for women, and two mixed. Of each 19 events, 17 are individual and two are relays.

== Editions ==
No.	Year	Host city	Country	Dates	Events	Winner of the medal table	Second in the medal table	Third in the medal table
Sprint Championships
1	1991	Gelsenkirchen	Germany	6–8 December	14	Germany	Soviet Union	Sweden
2	1992	Espoo	Finland	21–22 December	14	Germany	Sweden	Finland
3	1993	Gateshead	Great Britain	11–13 November	20	Germany	Sweden	Great Britain
4	1994	Stavanger	Norway	3–4 December	14	Germany	Sweden	Netherlands
Short Course Championships
1	1996	Rostock	Germany	13–15 December	38	Germany	Great Britain	Netherlands
2	1998	Sheffield	Great Britain	11–13 December	38	Germany	Great Britain	Netherlands
3	1999	Lisbon	Portugal	9–12 December	38	Sweden	Germany	Ukraine
4	2000	Valencia	Spain	14–17 December	38	Sweden	Italy	Germany
5	2001	Antwerp	Belgium	13–16 December	38	Germany	Sweden	Ukraine
6	2002	Riesa	Germany	12–15 December	38	Germany	Italy	Sweden
7	2003	Dublin	Ireland	11–14 December	38	Germany	Great Britain	Netherlands
8	2004	Vienna	Austria	9–12 December	38	Germany	Russia	Great Britain
9	2005	Trieste	Italy	8–11 December	38	Germany	Poland	Netherlands
10	2006	Helsinki	Finland	7–10 December	38	Germany	France	Italy
11	2007	Debrecen	Hungary	13–16 December	38	Germany	Russia	France
12	2008	Rijeka	Croatia	11–14 December	38	Russia	France	Italy
13	2009	Istanbul	Turkey	10–13 December	38	Netherlands	Russia	France
14	2010	Eindhoven	Netherlands	25–28 November	38	Germany	Netherlands	Hungary
15	2011	Szczecin	Poland	8–11 December	38	Germany	Denmark	Spain
16	2012	Chartres	France	22–25 November	40	France	Denmark	Hungary
17	2013	Herning	Denmark	12–15 December	40	Russia	Hungary	Denmark
18	2015	Netanya	Israel	2–6 December	40	Hungary	Italy	Germany
19	2017	Copenhagen	Denmark	13–17 December	40	Russia	Hungary	Italy
20	2019	Glasgow	Great Britain	4–8 December	40	Russia	Italy	Netherlands
21	2021	Kazan	Russia	2–7 November	42	Russia	Netherlands	Italy
22	2023	Otopeni	Romania	5–10 December	42	Great Britain	Italy	France
23	2025	Lublin	Poland	2–7 December	42	Italy	Netherlands	Great Britain

== Medals (1991–2025) ==
Rank	Nation	Gold	Silver	Bronze	Total
1	Germany	146	141	119	406
2	Russia	100	81	86	267
3	Netherlands	97	56	58	211
4	Italy	91	103	94	288
5	Sweden	85	68	47	200
6	Hungary	69	46	35	150
7	France	58	63	56	177
8	Great Britain	56	83	92	231
9	Ukraine	39	33	30	102
10	Poland	37	33	33	103
11	Denmark	23	42	37	102
12	Spain	23	26	27	76
13	Slovakia	19	7	7	33
14	Slovenia	18	17	23	58
15	Finland	15	13	17	45
16	Croatia	13	16	13	42
17	Austria	12	16	19	47
18	Czech Republic	11	17	21	49
19	Switzerland	10	10	9	29
20	Lithuania	8	9	11	28
21	Belarus	7	11	23	41
22	Serbia*	6	5	4	15
23	Iceland	6	3	4	13
24	Ireland	6	2	12	20
25	Estonia	4	8	6	18
26	Greece	4	5	14	23
27	Belgium	3	11	11	25
28	Norway	3	9	16	28
29	Soviet Union*	3	2	2	7
30	Israel	1	5	14	20
31	Turkey	1	5	6	12
32	Romania	1	4	10	15
33	Bulgaria	1	0	3	4
34	Portugal	0	1	3	4
35	Faroe Islands	0	1	0	1
36	Bosnia and Herzegovina	0	0	1	1
36	Liechtenstein	0	0	1	1
Totals (37 entries)		976	952	964	2,892

Note 1: Serbia medals Consist of Serbia and Montenegro medals also.

Note 2: Soviet Union is a former country.

== See also ==
- List of European Championships records in swimming
- List of European Short Course Swimming Championships medalists (men)
- List of European Short Course Swimming Championships medalists (women)
