= Swimming at the 1991 World Aquatics Championships =

These are the results (medal winners) of the swimming competition at the 1991 World Aquatics Championships.

== Medal table ==
* Host nation (Australia)

Rank	Nation	Gold	Silver	Bronze	Total
1	United States (USA)	13	7	3	23
2	Hungary (HUN)	5	2	1	8
3	Germany (GER)	4	9	7	20
4	China (CHN)	4	1	1	6
5	Australia (AUS)*	2	5	1	8
6	Soviet Union (URS)	1	1	5	7
7	Italy (ITA)	1	1	4	6
8	Spain (ESP)	1	0	1	2
9	Suriname (SUR)	1	0	0	1
10	France (FRA)	0	2	1	3
11	Great Britain (GBR)	0	1	1	2
11	Japan (JPN)	0	1	1	2
11	Netherlands (NED)	0	1	1	2
14	Canada (CAN)	0	1	0	1
14	Sweden (SWE)	0	1	0	1
16	Denmark (DEN)	0	0	2	2
16	Poland (POL)	0	0	2	2
Totals (17 entries)		32	33	31	96

== Medal summary ==
=== Men ===
Event	Gold		Silver		Bronze	
50 m freestyle	Tom Jager; United States	22.16; CR	Matt Biondi; United States	22.26	Gennadiy Prigoda; Soviet Union	22.62
100 m freestyle	Matt Biondi; United States	49.18	Tommy Werner; Sweden	49.63	Giorgio Lamberti; Italy	49.82
200 m freestyle	Giorgio Lamberti; Italy	1:47.27; CR	Steffen Zesner; Germany	1:48.28	Artur Wojdat; Poland	1:48.70
400 m freestyle	Jörg Hoffmann; Germany	3:48.04; CR	Stefan Pfeiffer; Germany	3:48.86	Artur Wojdat; Poland	3:49.67
1500 m freestyle	Jörg Hoffmann; Germany	14:50.36; WR	Kieren Perkins; Australia	14:50.58; OC	Stefan Pfeiffer; Germany	14:59.34
100 m backstroke	Jeff Rouse; United States	55.23; CR	Mark Tewksbury; Canada	55.29	Martín López-Zubero; Spain	55.61
200 m backstroke	Martín López-Zubero; Spain	1:59.52	Stefano Battistelli; Italy	1:59.98	Vladimir Selkov; Soviet Union	2:00.33
100 m breaststroke	Norbert Rózsa; Hungary	1:01.45; WR	Adrian Moorhouse; United Kingdom	1:01.58	Gianni Minervini; Italy	1:01.74
200 m breaststroke	Mike Barrowman; United States	2:11.23; WR	Norbert Rózsa; Hungary	2:12.03	Nick Gillingham; United Kingdom	2:13.12
100 m butterfly	Anthony Nesty; Suriname	53.29; CR	Michael Gross; Germany	53.31	Vladislav Kulikov; Soviet Union	53.74
200 m butterfly	Melvin Stewart; United States	1:55.69; WR	Michael Gross; Germany	1:56.78	Tamás Darnyi; Hungary	1:58.25
200 m individual medley	Tamás Darnyi; Hungary	1:59.36; WR	Eric Namesnik; United States	2:01.87	Christian Gessner; Germany	2:02.36
400 m individual medley	Tamás Darnyi; Hungary	4:12.36; WR	Eric Namesnik; United States	4:15.21	Stefano Battistelli; Italy	4:16.50
4 × 100 m freestyle relay	United States; Tom Jager (50.60); Brent Lang (48.77); Doug Gjertsen (49.51); Matt Biondi (48.27); Troy Dalbey^{[a]}	3:17.15; CR	Germany; Peter Sitt (50.68); Dirk Richter (49.29); Steffen Zesner (49.47); Bengt Zikarsky (49.44); Nils Rudolph^{[a]} Christian Tröger^{[a]}	3:18.88; NR	Soviet Union; Gennadiy Prigoda (50.74); Yuriy Bashkatov (49.54); Veniamin Tayanovich (49.17); Vladimir Tkashenko (49.52); Aleksei Borislavski^{[a]}	3:18.97
4 × 200 m freestyle relay	Germany; Peter Sitt (1:49.41); Steffen Zesner (1:48.18); Steffen Pfeiffer (1:49.05); Michael Gross (1:46.86); Jochen Bruha^{[a]} Christian Tröger^{[a]}	7:13.50; CR	United States; Troy Dalbey (1:48.69); Melvin Stewart (1:49.10); Dan Jorgensen (1:49.73); Doug Gjertsen (1:47.35); Paul Robinson^{[a]}	7:14.87	Italy; Emanuele Idini (1:50.40); Roberto Gleria (1:49.70); Stefano Battistelli (1:50.22); Giorgio Lamberti (1:46.86); Bruno Zorzan^{[a]}	7:17.18
4 × 100 m medley relay	United States; Jeff Rouse (55.28); Eric Wunderlich (1:02.26); Mark Henderson (53.59); Matt Biondi (48.53); Scot Johnson^{[a]} Mike Barrowman^{[a]} Bart Pippenger^{[a]} Brent Lang^{[a]}	3:39.66; CR	Soviet Union; Vladimir Shemetov (56.53); Dmitriy Volkov (1:00.74); Vladislav Kulikov (53.50); Veniamin Tayanovich (49.64)	3:40.41	Germany; Frank Hoffmeister (56.94); Christian Poswiat (1:01.66); Michael Gross (53.60); Dirk Richter (49.93); Thilo Haase^{[a]} Bengt Zikarsky^{[a]}	3:42.13; NR

Legend: AF African record | AM Americas record | AS Asian record | CR Championship record | ER European record | OC Oceania record | WR World record | NR National record
^{a} Swimmers who participated in the heats only and received medals.

=== Women ===
Event	Gold		Silver		Bronze	
50 m freestyle	Zhuang Yong; China	25.47	Leigh Ann Fetter; United States Catherine Plewinski; France	25.50	None awarded	
100 m freestyle	Nicole Haislett; United States	55.17	Catherine Plewinski; France	55.31	Zhuang Yong; China	55.65
200 m freestyle	Hayley Lewis; Australia	2:00.48	Janet Evans; United States	2:00.67	Mette Jacobsen; Denmark	2:00.93
400 m freestyle	Janet Evans; United States	4:08.63	Hayley Lewis; Australia	4:09.40	Suzu Chiba; Japan	4:11.44
800 m freestyle	Janet Evans; United States	8:24.05; CR	Grit Müller; Germany	8:30.20	Jana Henke; Germany	8:30.31
100 m backstroke	Krisztina Egerszegi; Hungary	1:01.78	Tünde Szabó; Hungary	1:01.98	Janie Wagstaff; United States	1:02.17
200 m backstroke	Krisztina Egerszegi; Hungary	2:09.15; CR, ER	Dagmar Hase; Germany	2:12.01	Janie Wagstaff; United States	2:13.14
100 m breaststroke	Linley Frame; Australia	1:08.81	Jana Dörries; Germany	1:09.35	Yelena Volkova; Soviet Union	1:09.66
200 m breaststroke	Yelena Volkova; Soviet Union	2:29.53	Linley Frame; Australia	2:30.02	Jana Dörries; Germany	2:30.14
100 m butterfly	Qian Hong; China	59.68	Wang Xiaohong; China	59.81	Catherine Plewinski; France	59.88
200 m butterfly	Summer Sanders; United States	2:09.24	Rie Shito; Japan	2:11.06	Hayley Lewis; Australia	2:11.09
200 m individual medley	Lin Li; China	2:13.40	Summer Sanders; United States	2:14.06	Daniela Hunger; Germany	2:16.16
400 m individual medley	Lin Li; China	4:41.45	Hayley Lewis; Australia	4:41.46; OC	Summer Sanders; United States	4:43.41
4 × 100 m freestyle relay	United States; Nicole Haislett (55.74); Julie Cooper (55.90); Whitney Hedgepeth (56.33); Jenny Thompson (55.29); Lynn Kohl^{[a]} Ashley Tappin^{[a]}	3:43.26; AM	Germany; Simone Osygus (56.58); Kerstin Kielgass (55.89); Karin Seick (56.32); Manuela Stellmach (55.68); Katrin Meissner^{[a]} Daniela Hunger^{[a]}	3:43.11	Netherlands; Mildred Muis (56.64); Inge de Bruijn (56.05); Marianne Muis (56.43); Karin Brienesse (55.93); Emile van de Plaats^{[a]} Manon Masseurs^{[a]}	3:45.05
4 × 200 m freestyle relay	Germany; Kerstin Kielgass (2:00.85); Manuela Stellmach (2:00.21); Dagmar Hase (2:00.36); Stephanie Ortwig (2:01.14); Katrin Meissner^{[a]} Svenja Schlicht^{[a]}	8:02.56	Netherlands; Marianne Muis (2:01.70); Manon Masseurs (2:02.29); Mildred Muis (2:01.99); Karin Brienesse (1:59.99); Emile van de Plaats^{[a]}	8:05.97; NR	Denmark; Gitta Jensen (2:02.29); Berit Puggaard (2:01.22); Annette Poulsen (2:04.03); Mette Jacobsen (1:59.66)	8:07.20; NR
4 × 100 m medley relay	United States; Janie Wagstaff (1:01.82); Tracey McFarlane (1:09.66); Crissy Ahmann-Leighton (1:00.27); Nicole Haislett (54.76); Jodi Wilson^{[a]} Tori DeSilva^{[a]} Julia Gorman^{[a]} Jenny Thompson^{[a]}	4:06.51; AM	Australia; Nicole Livingstone (1:02.79); Linley Frame (1:08.43); Susie O'Neill (59.61); Karen van Wirdum (57.21); Johanna Griggs^{[a]}	4:08.04; OC	Germany; Svenja Schlicht (1:02.67); Jana Dörries (1:09.20); Susanne Müller (1:02.57); Manuela Stellmach (56.06); Dagmar Hase^{[a]} Alexandra Hanel^{[a]} Katrin Jäke^{[a]} Kerstin Kielgass^{[a]}	4:10.50

Legend: AF African record | AM Americas record | AS Asian record | CR Championship record | ER European record | OC Oceania record | WR World record | NR National record
^{a} Swimmers who participated in the heats only and received medals.
