= 1989–90 FINA Swimming World Cup =

The 1989–90 FINA Swimming World Cup was the second of the series. It took place at eight short course venues in Europe and North America between November 1989 and February 1990. Seventeen swim styles were included for men and women.

== Meets ==
Dates and locations for the 1989–1990 World Cup meets were:

Dates	Location
November 20– December 1, 1989	Montreal, Canada
December 3–5, 1989	Orlando, Florida, United States [LCM]
February 2–4, 1990	Paris, France
February 5–7, 1990	(East Germany) East Berlin, Deutsche Demokratische Republik [LCM]
February 9–11, 1990	Bonn, Germany
February 13–14, 1990	Gothenburg, Sweden
February 16–18, 1990	Desenzano, Italy
February 23–25, 1990	(United Kingdom) Leicester, Great Britain

== Event winners ==
Event	Men Winner	Women Winner
Sprint	(Ukraine) Volodymyr Tkachenko	(Denmark) Gitta Jensen
Distance	(Sweden) Anders Holmertz	(East Germany) Astrid Strauss
Backstroke	(Canada) Mark Tewksbury	(Japan) Chikako Takase
Breaststroke	(Russia) Dmitri Volkov	(United States) Tracey McFarlane
Butterfly	(Canada) Marcel Gery	(United Kingdom) Madeleine Scarborough
Individual Medley	(Canada) Jon Kelly	(Canada) Nancy Sweetnam

=== 50 freestyle ===
Meet	Men Winner	Time	Women Winner	Time
#1: Montreal	(Switzerland) Dano Halsall	22.42	(Canada) Kristin Topham	25.84
#2: Orlando	(United States) Adam Schmitt	22.79	(United States) Nicole Haislett	25.79
#3: Paris	(Switzerland) Dano Halsall	22.11	(France) Catherine Plewinski	25.83
#4: East Berlin	(East Germany) Nils Rudolph	21.48	(East Germany) Daniela Hunger	26.31
#5: Bonn	(East Germany) Nils Rudolph	21.76	(Netherlands) Marianne Muis	25.64
#6: Gothenburg	(Australia) Andrew Baildon	22.82	(Sweden) Helena Aberg	26.49
#7: Desenzano	(Australia) Andrew Baildon	22.52	(Sweden) Linda Olofsson	26.22
#8: Leicester	(East Germany) Robert Pufleb	22.72	(United Kingdom) Nicola Kennedy	26.52

=== 100 freestyle ===
Meet	Men Winner	Time	Women Winner	Time
#1: Montreal	(United Kingdom) Mike Fibbens	49.14	(United States) Carrie Steinseifer	55.88
#2: Orlando	(United States) Troy Dalbey	50.82	(United States) Nicole Haislett	56.36
#3: Paris	(United States) Matt Biondi	49.31	(France) Catherine Plewinski	55.92
#4: East Berlin	(East Germany) Nils Rudolph	49.71	(East Germany) Katrin Meissner	56.27
#5: Bonn	(France) Stephan Caron	48.74	(Netherlands) Marianne Muis	54.49
#6: Gothenburg	(Norway) Jarl Inge Melberg	50.89	(Denmark) Gitta Jensen	57.44
#7: Desenzano	(Soviet Union) Yuri Bashkatov	49.31	(Denmark) Gitta Jensen	56.42
#8: Leicester	(East Germany) Robert Pufleb	49.95	(United Kingdom) Sharron Davies	57.11

=== 200 freestyle ===
Meet	Men Winner	Time	Women Winner	Time
#1: Montreal	(Sweden) Anders Holmertz	1:47.74	(United States) Nicole Haislett	2:01.43
#2: Orlando	(Sweden) Anders Holmertz	1:49.43	(China) Zhuang Yong	2:01.52
#3: Paris	(Sweden) Anders Holmertz	1:49.63	(Denmark) Mette Jacobsen	1:59.07
#4: East Berlin	(East Germany) Peter Sitt	1:49.63	(East Germany) Heike Friedrich	2:01.21
#5: Bonn	(Italy) Giorgio Lamberti	1:46.69 WR	(Denmark) Mette Jacobsen	1:57.07
#6: Gothenburg	(Sweden) Anders Holmertz	1:49.65	(Norway) Irene Dalby	2:04.39
#7: Desenzano	(Brazil) Cristiano Michelena	1:46.50	(Australia) Jennifer McMahon	2:00.16
#8: Leicester	(Canada) Jon Kelly	1:50.14	(Australia) Sheridan Burge-Lopez	2:03.04

=== 400 freestyle ===
Meet	Men Winner	Time	Women Winner	Time
#1: Montreal	(Sweden) Anders Holmertz	3:41.92	(Canada) Jennifer Goldsmith	4:16.84
#2: Orlando	(Soviet Union) Venia Tayanovich	3:56.65	(United States) Janet Evans	4:12.13
#3: Paris	(Sweden) Anders Holmertz	3:40.81 WR	(East Germany) Astrid Strauss	4:09.56
#4: East Berlin	(East Germany) Jorg Hoffmann	3:52.16	(East Germany) Astrid Strauss	4:15.01
#5: Bonn	(Germany) Stefan Pfeiffer	3:41.64	(East Germany) Astrid Strauss	4:07.04
#6: Gothenburg	(Sweden) Anders Holmertz	3:54.78	(Canada) Stephanie Sewchuk	4:22.07
#7: Desenzano	(Italy) Giorgio Lamberti	3:41.15	(Italy) Manuela Melchiorri	4:09.48
#8: Leicester	(United Kingdom) Ian Wilson	3:53.06	(Australia) Sheridan Burge-Lopez	4:13.92

=== 1500/800 freestyle ===
Meet	Men Winner	Time	Women Winner	Time
#1: Montreal	(Canada) Gary Vandermeulen	7:54.65	(Canada) Michelle Sallee	8:36.77
#2: Orlando	(Socialist Federal Republic of Yugoslavia) Igor Majcen	15:42.26	(United States) Janet Evans	8:30.62
#3: Paris	(Canada) Harry Taylor	15:02.54	(East Germany) Astrid Strauss	8:26.64
#4: East Berlin	(East Germany) Jorg Hoffmann	15:12.64	(East Germany) Astrid Strauss	8:40.14
#5: Bonn	(East Germany) Jorg Hoffmann	7:40.24	(East Germany) Astrid Strauss	8:27.27
#6: Gothenburg	(Australia) Glen Housman	15:26.48	(Norway) Irene Dalby	8:53.98
#7: Desenzano	(Canada) Turiough O'Hare	7:52.70	(Italy) Manuela Melchiorri	8:33.38
#8: Leicester	(United Kingdom) Ian Wilson	15:05.87	(Australia) Donna Procter	8:34.77

=== 50 Backstroke ===
Meet	Men Winner	Time	Women Winner	Time
#1: Montreal	(Canada) Mark Tewksbury	26.10	(China) Wenyi Yang	29.40
#2: Orlando	N/A	N/A	N/A	N/A
#3: Paris	N/A	N/A	N/A	N/A
#4: East Berlin	N/A	N/A	N/A	N/A
#5: Bonn	(Japan) Daichi Suzuki	25.10	(Netherlands) Ellen Elzermann	29.47
#6: Gothenburg	(Canada) Mark Tewksbury	26.36	(Australia) Johanna Griggs	30.63
#7: Desenzano	N/A	N/A	N/A	N/A
#8: Leicester	(Canada) Marcel Gery	25.74	(Italy) Barbara Scaini	30.00

=== 100 Backstroke ===
Meet	Men Winner	Time	Women Winner	Time
#1: Montreal	(Canada) Mark Tewksbury	54.77	(China) Wenyi Yang	1:04.11
#2: Orlando	(Russia) Sergei Zabolotnov	57.31	(United States) Janie Wagstaff	1:03.90
#3: Paris	(Canada) Mark Tewksbury	55.34	(Italy) Lorenza Vigarini	1:03.28
#4: East Berlin	(Canada) Mark Tewksbury	54.85	(Soviet Union) Natalia Shibajeva	1:03.51
#5: Bonn	(Canada) Mark Tewksbury	54.57	(East Germany) Dagmar Hase	1:03.36
#6: Gothenburg	(Canada) Mark Tewksbury	56.44	(Australia) Johanna Griggs	1:05.32
#7: Desenzano	(Japan) Daichi Suzuki	55.59	(Italy) Lorenza Vigarini	1:03.36
#8: Leicester	(Canada) Kevin Draxinger	56.52	(United Kingdom) Sharron Davies	1:03.38

=== 200 Backstroke ===
Meet	Men Winner	Time	Women Winner	Time
#1: Montreal	(United Kingdom) Grant Robbins	1:59.70	(Japan) Yuka Akiyama	2:17.10
#2: Orlando	(United States) Dan Veatch	2:01.85	(United States) Janie Wagstaff	2:15.33
#3: Paris	(Canada) Kevin Draxinger	1:58.20	(Japan) Chikako Takase	2:11.77
#4: East Berlin	(Soviet Union) Vladimir Selkov	2:02.04	(East Germany) Dagmar Hase	2:13.80
#5: Bonn	(Canada) Kevin Draxinger	1:57.96	(East Germany) Dagmar Hase	2:11.00
#6: Gothenburg	N/A	N/A	N/A	N/A
#7: Desenzano	(Canada) Kevin Draxinger	1:59.66	(Italy) Lorenza Vigarini	2:13.68
#8: Leicester	(Canada) Kevin Draxinger	2:00.95	(Australia) Karen Lord	2:17.20

=== 50 Breaststroke ===
Meet	Men Winner	Time	Women Winner	Time
#1: Montreal	(Soviet Union) Dmitri Volkov	27.78	(Canada) Keltie Duggan	31.91
#2: Orlando	N/A	N/A	N/A	N/A
#3: Paris	N/A	N/A	N/A	N/A
#4: East Berlin	N/A	N/A	N/A	N/A
#5: Bonn	(Soviet Union) Dmitri Volkov	27.31	(East Germany) Peggy Jähnichen	31.42
#6: Gothenburg	(Soviet Union) Dmitri Volkov	28.22	(United States) Tracey McFarlane	32.79
#7: Desenzano	N/A	N/A	N/A	N/A
#8: Leicester	(Netherlands) Ron Dekker	27.65	(United Kingdom) Lorraine Coombes	32.74

=== 100 Breaststroke ===
Meet	Men Winner	Time	Women Winner	Time
#1: Montreal	(Russia) Dmitri Volkov	1:00.58	(Canada) Keltie Duggan	1:09.15
#2: Orlando	(Cuba) Pedro Hernández	1:00.95	(United States) Tori Desilvia	1:11.36
#3: Paris	(Russia) Dmitri Volkov	1:02.96	(Russia) Elena Volkova	1:07.73
#4: East Berlin	(Germany) Mark Warnecke	1:03.24	(East Germany) Peggy Jähnichen	1:11.13
#5: Bonn	(Soviet Union) Dmitri Volkov	59.30 WR	(East Germany) Peggy Jähnichen	1:08.57
#6: Gothenburg	(Soviet Union) Dmitri Volkov	1:02.42	(United States) Tracey McFarlane	1:12.24
#7: Desenzano	(Soviet Union) Dmitri Volkov	59.77	(Italy) Manuela Dalla Valle	1:09.82
#8: Leicester	(Netherlands) Ron Dekker	59.82	(United Kingdom) Lorraine Coombes	1:10.97

=== 200 Breaststroke ===
Meet	Men Winner	Time	Women Winner	Time
#1: Montreal	(United Kingdom) Nick Gillingham	2:09.29	(Italy) Annalisa Nisiro	2:30.96
#2: Orlando	(Spain) Sergio López	2:14.60	(Canada) Nathalie Giguere	2:32.46
#3: Paris	(Republic of Ireland) Gary O'Toole	2:11.91	(Soviet Union) Elena Volkova	2:26.44
#4: East Berlin	(East Germany) Thomas Müller	2:17.69	(Soviet Union) Julia Bogatchova	2:33.29
#5: Bonn	(Belgium) Sydney Appelboom	2:11.11	(Japan) Asako Natsume	2:27.84
#6: Gothenburg	N/A	N/A	N/A	N/A
#7: Desenzano	(Soviet Union) Dmitri Volkov	2:11.16	(Italy) Manuela Dalla Valle	2:28.98
#8: Leicester	(Netherlands) Ron Dekker	2:12.23	(United Kingdom) Linda McLaren	2:38.67

=== 50 Butterfly ===
Meet	Men Winner	Time	Women Winner	Time
#1: Montreal	(Canada) Marcel Gery	24.40	(Canada) Krisitn Topham	28.27
#2: Orlando	N/A	N/A	N/A	N/A
#3: Paris	N/A	N/A	N/A	N/A
#4: East Berlin	N/A	N/A	N/A	N/A
#5: Bonn	(East Germany) Nils Rudolph	24.16	(East Germany) Christiane Sievert	27.54 WR
#6: Gothenburg	(Soviet Union) Evgeni Kotriaga	24.80	(Sweden) Anna Lindberg	28.46
#7: Desenzano	N/A	N/A	N/A	N/A
#8: Leicester	(Canada) Marcel Gery	24.11 WR	(United Kingdom) Sharron Davies	28.60

=== 100 Butterfly ===
Meet	Men Winner	Time	Women Winner	Time
#1: Montreal	(Canada) Marcel Gery	53.02	(United Kingdom) Madeleine Scarborough	1:01.47
#2: Orlando	(United States) Bart Pippenger	55.02	(United States) Janel Jorgensen	1:02.12
#3: Paris	(Canada) Tom Ponting	53.31	(France) Catherine Plewinski	59.83
#4: East Berlin	(East Germany) Martin Herrmann	54.80	(East Germany) Christiane Sievert	1:01.45
#5: Bonn	(Australia) Andrew Baildon	52.89	(East Germany) Christiane Sievert	1:00.42
#6: Gothenburg	(Canada) Marcel Gery	53.73	(United Kingdom) Madeleine Scarborough	1:02.32
#7: Desenzano	(Canada) Marcel Gery	53.13	(Italy) Ilaria Tocchini	1:01.48
#8: Leicester	(Canada) Marcel Gery	52.78	(United Kingdom) Madeleine Scarborough	1:01.79

=== 200 Butterfly ===
Meet	Men Winner	Time	Women Winner	Time
#1: Montreal	(Canada) Tom Ponting	1:58.79	(Canada) Maria Gaudin	2:12.38
#2: Orlando	(New Zealand) Anthony Mosse	2:02.20	(United States) Summer Sanders	2:14.15
#3: Paris	(Canada) Tom Ponting	1:57.67	(Japan) Rie Shito	2:10.48
#4: East Berlin	(Canada) Jon Kelly	2:01.00	(East Germany) Kathleen Nord	2:13.26
#5: Bonn	(Canada) Gary Vandermeulen	1:57.02	(Japan) Rie Shito	2:10.03
#6: Gothenburg	N/A	N/A	N/A	N/A
#7: Desenzano	(Japan) Kunio Sugimoto	1:56.47	(Australia) Hellen Morris	2:14.82
#8: Leicester	(Canada) Jon Kelly	1:56.35	(Australia) Donna Procter	2:14.82

=== 100 Individual Medley ===
Meet	Men Winner	Time	Women Winner	Time
#1: Montreal	(United Kingdom) Grant Robbins	57.22	(China) Li Lin	1:03.00
#2: Orlando	N/A	N/A	N/A	N/A
#3: Paris	N/A	N/A	N/A	N/A
#4: East Berlin	N/A	N/A	N/A	N/A
#5: Bonn	(Germany) Josef Hladky	55.48	(East Germany) Daniela Hunger	1:02.74
#6: Gothenburg	N/A	N/A	N/A	N/A
#7: Desenzano	N/A	N/A	N/A	N/A
#8: Leicester	N/A	N/A	N/A	N/A

=== 200 Individual Medley ===
Meet	Men Winner	Time	Women Winner	Time
#1: Montreal	(United Kingdom) Grant Robbins	2:01.33	(China) Li Lin	2:14.55
#2: Orlando	(United States) Ron Karnaugh	2:03.55	(United States) Summer Sanders	2:17.50
#3: Paris	(France) Frederic Lefevre	2:01.49	(Japan) Eri Kimura	2:15.35
#4: East Berlin	(East Germany) Christian Gessner	2:03.56	(East Germany) Daniela Hunger	2:18.50
#5: Bonn	(Germany) Josef Hladky	1:59.46	(Netherlands) Marianne Muis	2:13.44
#6: Gothenburg	(Australia) Bruce Robert	2:05.12	(Russia) Elena Dendeberova	2:19.77
#7: Desenzano	(Italy) Luca Sacchi	2:00.69	(Russia) Elena Dendeberova	2:15.63
#8: Leicester	(Canada) Jon Kelly	2:02.74	(Australia) Donna Procter	4:19.73

=== 400 Individual Medley ===
Meet	Men Winner	Time	Women Winner	Time
#1: Montreal	(United Kingdom) Grant Robbins	4:16.72	(China) Li Lin	4:45.45
#2: Orlando	(Sweden) Jan Birdman	4:24.60	(United States) Janet Evans	4:48.09
#3: Paris	(France) Frederic Lefevre	4:17.66	(Japan) Eri Kimura	4:45.60
#4: East Berlin	(East Germany) Patrick Khul	4:18.41	(Japan) Eri Kimura	4:49.52
#5: Bonn	(East Germany) Patrick Khul	4:12.02	(East Germany) Kathleen Nord	4:43.38
#6: Gothenburg	(Canada) Jon Kelly	4:29.13	(China) Yang Min	4:55.13
#7: Desenzano	(Italy) Luca Sacchi	4:15.50	(China) Yang Min	4:49.24
#8: Leicester	(Canada) Nick Cosgrove	4:28.88	(Australia) Donna Procter	4:49.77
