= 1991 FINA Swimming World Cup =

The 1991 FINA Swimming World Cup was the third of the series. It took place at seven short course venues in Europe and North America in March and April 1991. Seventeen swim styles were included for men and women.

== Meets ==
Dates and locations for the 1991 World Cup meets were:

Dates	Location
March 12– 14, 1991	Milan, Italy
March 16–17, 1991	Bonn, Germany
March 19–20, 1991	Malmo, Sweden
March 22–23, 1991	Rostock, Germany
March 26–27, 1991	Leningrad, Soviet Union
March 29–30, 1991	(United Kingdom) Sheffield, Great Britain
April 9–10, 1991	Victoria, Canada

== Event winners ==
Event	Men Winner	Women Winner
Sprint	(Soviet Union) Aleksandr Popov	(Germany) Simone Osygus
Distance	(Germany) Uwe Dassler	(Italy) Cristina Sossi
Backstroke	(Canada) Mark Tewksbury	(Germany) Dagmar Hase
Breaststroke	(Soviet Union) Dmitri Volkov	(Germany) Peggy Hartung
Butterfly	(Canada) Marcel Gery	(Germany) Christiane Sievert
Individual Medley	(Germany) Joszef Hladky	(Japan) Eri Kimura

=== 50 freestyle ===
Meet	Men Winner	Time	Women Winner	Time
#1: Milano	(Soviet Union) Aleksandr Popov	22.10	(China) Zhuang Yong	25.57
#2: Bonn	(Germany) Silko Günzel	22.04	(China) Zhuang Yong	25.36
#3: Malmö	(Soviet Union) Aleksandr Popov	22.53	(Canada) Andrea Nugent	25.92
#4: Rostock	(Germany) Nils Rudolph	22.27	(China) Jingyi Le	25.63
#5: Leningrad	(Soviet Union) Vladimir Predkin	22.79	(Germany) Simone Osygus	26.03
#6: Sheffield	(Soviet Union) Vladimir Predkin	22.29	(Canada) Andrea Nugent	25.61
#7: Victoria	(United States) Todd Pace	22.32	(Germany) Simone Osygus	25.79

=== 100 freestyle ===
Meet	Men Winner	Time	Women Winner	Time
#1: Milano	(Soviet Union) Aleksandr Popov	49.25	(Germany) Regina Dittmann	57.12
#2: Bonn	(Soviet Union) Aleksandr Popov	48.92	(Germany) Simone Osygus	55.50
#3: Malmö	(Soviet Union) Aleksandr Popov	48.70	(Germany) Susanne Bosserhoff	56.72
#4: Rostock	(Soviet Union) Vladimir Predkin	48.94	(Germany) Simone Osygus	55.11
#5: Leningrad	(Soviet Union) Aleksandr Popov	49.96	(Germany) Simone Osygus	55.94
#6: Sheffield	(United Kingdom) Mike Fibbens	48.89	(Canada) Andrea Nugent	55.60
#7: Victoria	(United Kingdom) Mike Fibbens	49.00	(Germany) Simone Osygus	55.31

=== 200 freestyle ===
Meet	Men Winner	Time	Women Winner	Time
#1: Milano	(Germany) Uwe Dassler	1:48.17	(Australia) Julie Majer	2:01.86
#2: Bonn	(Germany) Christian Keller	1:46.37	(Netherlands) Karin Brienesse	1:58.99
#3: Malmö	(Germany) Christian Tröger	1:46.99	(Germany) Heike Friedrich	2:00.37
#4: Rostock	(Soviet Union) Evgeni Sadovyi	1:46.64	(Germany) Simone Osygus	1:59.61
#5: Leningrad	(Germany) Uwe Dassler	1:49.03	(Germany) Simone Osygus	1:59.57
#6: Sheffield	(Germany) Uwe Dassler	1:47.51	(United Kingdom) Joanna Coull	2:01.14
#7: Victoria	(United Kingdom) Paul Howe	1:46.71	(Germany) Simone Osygus	1:58.22

=== 400 freestyle ===
Meet	Men Winner	Time	Women Winner	Time
#1: Milano	(Germany) Uwe Dassler	3:48.81	(Italy) Cristina Sossi	4:11.91
#2: Bonn	(Germany) Stefan Pfeiffer	3:47.40	(Australia) Brooke Ayre	4:10.07
#3: Malmö	(Sweden) Anders Holmertz	3:48.04	(Italy) Cristina Sossi	4:11.13
#4: Rostock	(Soviet Union) Evgeni Sadovyi	3:43.34	(Germany) Jana Henke	4:12.01
#5: Leningrad	(Germany) Uwe Dassler	3:49.86	(Soviet Union) Natalia Trefilova	4:14.74
#6: Sheffield	(Germany) Uwe Dassler	3:46.86	(United Kingdom) Debbie Jones	4:14.61
#7: Victoria	(United Kingdom) Paul Howe	3:47.42	(Italy) Cristina Sossi	4:12.05

=== 1500/800 freestyle ===
Meet	Men Winner	Time	Women Winner	Time
#1: Milano	(Germany) Uwe Dassler	7:53.90	(Italy) Cristina Sossi	8:26.09
#2: Bonn	(Germany) Jorg Hoffmann	7:51.75	(Italy) Cristina Sossi	8:28.04
#3: Malmö	(Poland) Piotr Albinski	15:01.46	(Italy) Cristina Sossi	8:30.20
#4: Rostock	(Germany) Uwe Dassler	7:47.88	(Germany) Jana Henke	8:33.25
#5: Leningrad	(Soviet Union) Anton Sipkin	15:26.51	(Soviet Union) Olga Kuznetsova	8:50.86
#6: Sheffield	(United Kingdom) Ian Wilson	15:12.81	(United Kingdom) Debbie Jones	8:44.70
#7: Victoria	(United Kingdom) Ian Wilson	15:08.81	(Italy) Cristina Sossi	8:30.83

=== 50 Backstroke ===
Meet	Men Winner	Time	Women Winner	Time
#1: Milano	N/A	N/A	N/A	N/A
#2: Bonn	(Canada) Mark Tewksbury	25.25	(Germany) Sandra Völker	29.50
#3: Malmö	(Canada) Mark Tewksbury	25.22	(Germany) Anja Eichhorst	29.50
#4: Rostock	(Germany) Frank Hoffmeister	25.24	(Germany) Anja Eichhorst	29.02
#5: Leningrad	(Canada) Mark Tewksbury	25.71	(United Kingdom) Sharon Page	29.66
#6: Sheffield	(Republic of Ireland) Adrian O'Connor	26.54	(United Kingdom) Sharon Page	29.35
#7: Victoria	(Canada) Mark Tewksbury	25.32	(Germany) Anja Eichhorst	29.02

=== 100 Backstroke ===
Meet	Men Winner	Time	Women Winner	Time
#1: Milano	(Canada) Mark Tewksbury	53.89	(Germany) Dagmar Hase	1:01.65
#2: Bonn	(Canada) Mark Tewksbury	52.71 WR	(United Kingdom) Joanne Deakins	1:02.90
#3: Malmö	(Canada) Mark Tewksbury	52.90	(Germany) Anja Eichhorst	1:02.42
#4: Rostock	(Canada) Mark Tewksbury	53.76	(Germany) Dagmar Hase	1:01.06
#5: Leningrad	(Canada) Mark Tewksbury	54.39	(United Kingdom) Sharon Page	1:02.78
#6: Sheffield	(Canada) Mark Tewksbury	52.58 WR	(Germany) Dagmar Hase	1:01.66
#7: Victoria	(Canada) Mark Tewksbury	53.08	(Germany) Dagmar Hase	1:01.24

=== 200 Backstroke ===
Meet	Men Winner	Time	Women Winner	Time
#1: Milano	(Canada) Luca Bianchin	1:57.43	(Germany) Dagmar Hase	2:10.40
#2: Bonn	(Finland) Jani Sievinen	1:56.61	(United Kingdom) Joanne Deakins	2:10.55
#3: Malmö	N/A	N/A	N/A	N/A
#4: Rostock	(Germany) Tino Weber	1:57.04	(Germany) Dagmar Hase	2:07.89
#5: Leningrad	(Soviet Union) Vladimir Selkov	1:58.37	(Soviet Union) Natalia Krupskaya	2:13.59
#6: Sheffield	(Canada) Mark Tewksbury	1:56.22	(Germany) Dagmar Hase	2:08.55
#7: Victoria	(Canada) Mark Tewksbury	1:56.03	(Germany) Dagmar Hase	2:07.74

=== 50 Breaststroke ===
Meet	Men Winner	Time	Women Winner	Time
#1: Milano	N/A	N/A	N/A	N/A
#2: Bonn	(Soviet Union) Dmitri Volkov	27.29 WR	(Germany) Peggy Hartung	31.42
#3: Malmö	(Soviet Union) Dmitri Volkov	27.79	(Sweden) Louise Karlsson	31.65
#4: Rostock	(Germany) Christian Poswiat	28.21	(Germany) Peggy Hartung	31.94
#5: Leningrad	(Soviet Union) Dmitri Volkov	27.38	(Germany) Peggy Hartung	31.52
#6: Sheffield	(Germany) Christian Poswiat	28.37	(Germany) Peggy Hartung	31.75
#7: Victoria	(Soviet Union) Dmitri Volkov	27.80	(Germany) Peggy Hartung	31.40

=== 100 Breaststroke ===
Meet	Men Winner	Time	Women Winner	Time
#1: Milano	(Soviet Union) Dmitri Volkov	59.73	(Soviet Union) Elena Volkova	1:08.84
#2: Bonn	(Soviet Union) Dmitri Volkov	59.57	(Soviet Union) Elena Volkova	1:08.45
#3: Malmö	(Soviet Union) Dmitri Volkov	1:00.19	(Sweden) Louise Karlsson	1:08.66
#4: Rostock	(Germany) Christian Poswiat	1:01.63	(Germany) Peggy Hartung	1:08.93
#5: Leningrad	(Soviet Union) Alexei Matveev	1:01.30	(Soviet Union) Elena Rudovskaya	1:08.62
#6: Sheffield	(United Kingdom) Adrian Moorhouse	1:00.37	(Germany) Peggy Hartung	1:08.28
#7: Victoria	(Soviet Union) Dmitri Volkov	1:00.12	(Soviet Union) Elena Volkova	1:08.23

=== 200 Breaststroke ===
Meet	Men Winner	Time	Women Winner	Time
#1: Milano	(Soviet Union) Dmitri Volkov	2:11.60	(Soviet Union) Elena Volkova	2:27.58
#2: Bonn	(Spain) Joaquín Fernández	2:11.43	(Italy) Manuela Dalla Valle	2:27.50
#3: Malmö	N/A	N/A	N/A	N/A
#4: Rostock	(Canada) Robert Fox	2:15.05	(Soviet Union) Elena Rudovskaya	2:27.93
#5: Leningrad	(Soviet Union) Andrei Korneev	2:12.54	(Soviet Union) Elena Rudovskaya	2:26.67
#6: Sheffield	(Canada) Robert Fox	2:13.81	(Italy) Manuela Dalla Valle	2:26.30
#7: Victoria	(United States) Seith Van Neerden	2:12.24	(Soviet Union) Elena Rudovskaya	2:27.10

=== 50 Butterfly ===
Meet	Men Winner	Time	Women Winner	Time
#1: Milano	N/A	N/A	N/A	N/A
#2: Bonn	(Spain) Carlos Sánchez	24.26	(Netherlands) Inge de Bruijn	27.43
#3: Malmö	(Canada) Marcel Gery	24.33	(Sweden) Louise Karlsson	27.65
#4: Rostock	(Germany) Nils Rudolph	24.45	(China) Hong Qian	27.90
#5: Leningrad	(Soviet Union) Konstantin Petrov	24.82	(China) Hong Qian	27.47
#6: Sheffield	(Germany) Nils Rudolph	24.05 WR	(Canada) Andrea Nugent	27.92
#7: Victoria	(United States) Jim Harvey	24.82	(Canada) Andrea Nugent	28.09

=== 100 Butterfly ===
Meet	Men Winner	Time	Women Winner	Time
#1: Milano	(Canada) Marcel Gery	53.88	(Italy) Ilari Tochini	1:02.04
#2: Bonn	(Canada) Marcel Gery	53.18	(Netherlands) Karin Brienesse	1:00.83
#3: Malmö	(Canada) Tom Ponting	53.22	(Germany) Christiane Sievert	1:00.71
#4: Rostock	(Germany) Martin Herrmann	53.99	(Germany) Christiane Sievert	1:01.76
#5: Leningrad	(Germany) Martin Herrmann	54.51	(China) Hong Qian	1:00.22
#6: Sheffield	(France) Bruno Gutzeit	53.99	(Germany) Susanne Muller	1:01.44
#7: Victoria	(United States) Jim Harvey	53.75	(Sweden) Therese Lundin	1:01.62

=== 200 Butterfly ===
Meet	Men Winner	Time	Women Winner	Time
#1: Milano	(Canada) Marcel Gery	1:58.67	(Australia) Julie Majer	2:12.73
#2: Bonn	(Germany) Christian Keller	1:57.67	(Australia) Julie Majer	2:11.36
#3: Malmö	N/A	N/A	N/A	N/A
#4: Rostock	(Soviet Union) Denis Pankratov	1:57.67	(Germany) Katrin Jake	2:13.07
#5: Leningrad	(Soviet Union) Denis Pankratov	1:58.33	(Soviet Union) Elena Talaleva	2:15.11
#6: Sheffield	(United Kingdom) Tim Jones	1:57.86	(Germany) Katrin Jake	2:12.94
#7: Victoria	(United Kingdom) Tim Jones	1:58.00	(Canada) Maria Gaudin	2:13.94

=== 100 Individual Medley ===
Meet	Men Winner	Time	Women Winner	Time
#1: Milano	N/A	N/A	N/A	N/A
#2: Bonn	(Germany) Josef Hladky	54.66 WR	(Canada) Nancy Sweetnam	1:02.86
#3: Malmö	N/A	N/A	N/A	N/A
#4: Rostock	(Canada) Darren Ward	55.39	(Soviet Union) Daria Shmeleva	1:03.44
#5: Leningrad	(Germany) Josef Hladky	55.35	(Germany) Marion Zoller	1:03.94
#6: Sheffield	(Canada) Darren Ward	55.73	(Germany) Marion Zoller	1:02.75 WR
#7: Victoria	(Germany) Josef Hladky	54.63	(Canada) Nancy Sweetnam	1:02.99

=== 200 Individual Medley ===
Meet	Men Winner	Time	Women Winner	Time
#1: Milano	(Germany) Josef Hladky	1:59.92	(Canada) Nancy Sweetnam	2:14.06
#2: Bonn	(Germany) Josef Hladky	1:59.16	(Canada) Nancy Sweetnam	2:12.91
#3: Malmö	(Canada) Darren Ward	1:58.39	(Canada) Nancy Sweetnam	2:12.50
#4: Rostock	(Germany) Josef Hladky	2:00.63	(Soviet Union) Daria Shmeleva	2:14.64
#5: Leningrad	(Germany) Josef Hladky	2:00.81	(Soviet Union) Daria Shmeleva	2:16.18
#6: Sheffield	(Canada) Darren Ward	1:58.36	(Soviet Union) Daria Shmeleva	2:14.84
#7: Victoria	(Germany) Josef Hladky	1:59.81	(Canada) Nancy Sweetnam	2:13.97

=== 400 Individual Medley ===
Meet	Men Winner	Time	Women Winner	Time
#1: Milano	(Italy) Luca Sacchi	4:12.15	(Canada) Nancy Sweetnam	4:39.32
#2: Bonn	(Canada) Darren Ward	4:12.83	(Canada) Nancy Sweetnam	4:40.85
#3: Malmö	(Canada) Darren Ward	4:12.60	(Canada) Nancy Sweetnam	4:40.73
#4: Rostock	(Canada) Darren Ward	4:16.40	(Czechoslovakia) Hana Cerna	4:47.85
#5: Leningrad	N/A	N/A	N/A	N/A
#6: Sheffield	N/A	N/A	N/A	N/A
#7: Victoria	(Canada) Darren Ward	4:16.67	(Canada) Nancy Sweetnam	4:43.34
