= Swimming at the 1992 Summer Olympics – Women's 100 metre breaststroke =

Women's 100 metre breaststroke at the Games of the XXV Olympiad
- Venue: Piscines Bernat Picornell
- Date: 29 July 1992 (heats & finals)
- Competitors: 43 from 31 nations
- Winning time: 1:08.00 NR

Medalists
1st place, gold medalist(s)		Yelena Rudkovskaya	Unified Team
2nd place, silver medalist(s)		Anita Nall	United States
3rd place, bronze medalist(s)		Samantha Riley	Australia

The women's 100 metre breaststroke event at the 1992 Summer Olympics took place on 29 July at the Piscines Bernat Picornell in Barcelona, Spain.

== Records ==
Prior to this competition, the existing world and Olympic records were as follows.

World record	Silke Hörner (GDR)	1:07.91	Strasbourg, France	21 August 1987
Olympic record	Tanya Dangalakova (BUL)	1:07.95	Seoul, South Korea	23 September 1988

== Results ==
=== Heats ===
Rule: The eight fastest swimmers advance to final A (Q), while the next eight to final B (q).

Rank	Heat	Lane	Name	Nationality	Time	Notes
1	5	2	Yelena Rudkovskaya	Unified Team	1:08.75	Q, NR
2	6	4	Anita Nall	United States	1:09.32	Q
3	5	4	Samantha Riley	Australia	1:09.38	Q
4	6	3	Manuela Dalla Valle	Italy	1:09.78	Q
5	4	4	Guylaine Cloutier	Canada	1:09.89	Q
6	6	6	Jana Dörries	Germany	1:10.00	Q
7	4	6	Daniela Brendel	Germany	1:10.49	Q
8	4	5	Gabriella Csépe	Hungary	1:10.58	Q
9	4	1	Alicja Pęczak	Poland	1:10.60	q
10	6	7	Lou Xia	China	1:10.74	q
11	4	3	Magdalena Kupiec	Poland	1:10.90	q
12	5	7	Lisa Flood	Canada	1:10.95	q
13	6	2	Kyoko Iwasaki	Japan	1:11.00	q
14	5	5	Megan Kleine	United States	1:11.04	q
15	5	3	Lu Di	China	1:11.58	q
15	6	5	Linley Frame	Australia	1:11.58	q
17	5	6	Kyoko Kasuya	Japan	1:11.60	
18	3	7	Kira Bulten	Netherlands	1:11.81	
19	6	8	Ragnheiður Runólfsdóttir	Iceland	1:12.14	
20	4	2	Yelena Volkova	Unified Team	1:12.46	
21	4	8	Brigitte Becue	Belgium	1:12.82	
22	3	2	Rocío Ruiz	Spain	1:13.11	
23	6	1	Suki Brownsdon	Great Britain	1:13.24	
24	4	7	Jaime King	Great Britain	1:13.32	
25	2	2	Martina Nemec	Austria	1:13.34	NR
26	5	1	Park Mi-yeong	South Korea	1:13.49	
27	5	8	Britta Vestergaard	Denmark	1:13.58	
28	2	6	Jennifer Smatt	Bermuda	1:13.94	
29	3	3	Lenka Maňhalová	Czechoslovakia	1:13.96	
30	3	4	Audrey Guérit	France	1:13.98	
31	2	5	Sornsawan Phuvichit	Thailand	1:14.69	
32	3	6	Elena Donati	Italy	1:14.70	
33	2	4	Penny Heyns	South Africa	1:14.99	
34	3	5	Martine Janssen	Netherlands	1:15.10	
35	2	3	Riikka Ukkola	Finland	1:15.56	
36	1	5	Tammie Kaae	Guam	1:16.78	
37	2	7	Barbara Pexa	Guam	1:17.71	
38	2	1	Vola Hanta Ratsifa Andrihamanana	Madagascar	1:17.77	
39	1	4	Claudia Velásquez	Peru	1:17.80	
40	1	3	Priscilla Madero	Ecuador	1:20.76	
41	1	2	Nádia Cruz	Angola	1:21.50	
42	1	7	Elke Talma	Seychelles	1:29.91	
	1	6	Nguyễn Thị Phương	Vietnam	DSQ	

=== Finals ===
==== Final B ====
Rank	Lane	Name	Nationality	Time	Notes
9	5	Lou Xia	China	1:10.07	
10	3	Magdalena Kupiec	Poland	1:10.32	NR
11	4	Alicja Pęczak	Poland	1:10.73	
12	7	Megan Kleine	United States	1:11.07	
13	2	Kyoko Iwasaki	Japan	1:11.16	
14	6	Lisa Flood	Canada	1:11.17	
15	1	Linley Frame	Australia	1:11.36	
16	8	Lu Di	China	1:12.07	

==== Final A ====
Rank	Lane	Name	Nationality	Time	Notes
1st place, gold medalist(s)	4	Yelena Rudkovskaya	Unified Team	1:08.00	NR
2nd place, silver medalist(s)	5	Anita Nall	United States	1:08.17	AM
3rd place, bronze medalist(s)	3	Samantha Riley	Australia	1:09.25	OC
4	2	Guylaine Cloutier	Canada	1:09.71	
5	7	Jana Dörries	Germany	1:09.77	
6	8	Gabriella Csépe	Hungary	1:10.19	
7	6	Manuela Dalla Valle	Italy	1:10.39	
8	1	Daniela Brendel	Germany	1:11.05	
