= 1988 European Junior Swimming Championships =

Water sport competitions

The 1988 European Junior Swimming Championships were held from July 28 to July 31, 1988, in Amersfoort, Netherlands.

== Medal table ==
* Host nation (Netherlands)

Rank	Nation	Gold	Silver	Bronze	Total
1	East Germany (GDR)	11	11	8	30
2	Soviet Union (URS)	10	7	6	23
3	West Germany (FRG)	4	3	8	15
4	Hungary (HUN)	4	3	0	7
5	Great Britain (GBR)	1	3	3	7
6	Romania (ROU)	1	0	2	3
7	Yugoslavia (YUG)	1	0	1	2
8	Italy (ITA)	0	3	2	5
9	Netherlands (NED)*	0	1	2	3
10	Poland (POL)	0	1	0	1
Totals (10 entries)		32	32	32	96

== Medal summary ==
=== Boy's events ===
Event	Gold		Silver		Bronze	
50 m freestyle	Raimundas Mažuolis; Soviet Union	23.05^{CR}	Aleksandr Vasiliev; Soviet Union	23.96	Enrico Buchholz; East Germany	24.19
100 m freestyle	Raimundas Mažuolis; Soviet Union	50.39^{CR}	Christian Thurnser; West Germany	52.73	Dmitriy Lepikov; Soviet Union	52.73
200 m freestyle	Andrei Romanov; Soviet Union	1:54.66	Vincent Elgersma; Netherlands	1:54.77	Dmitriy Lepikov; Soviet Union	1:54.94
400 m freestyle	Torsten Wilhelm; East Germany	3:59.12	Aleksey Kudriavtsev; Soviet Union	4:00.06	Gregor Jurak; Yugoslavia	4:01.21
1500 m freestyle	Torsten Wilhelm; East Germany	15:41.30	Aleksey Kudriavtsev; Soviet Union	15:49.71	Ross Noble; Great Britain	16:00.12
100 m backstroke	Sergey Grishhaev; Soviet Union	59.28	Emanuele Merisi; Italy	59.92	Lars Kalenka; West Germany	59.98
200 m backstroke	Lars Kalenka; West Germany	2:05.01	Ralf Braun; East Germany	2:06.89	Emanuele Merisi; Italy	2:07.43
100 m breaststroke	Ian McKenzie; Great Britain	1:05.31	Francesco Postiglione; Italy	1:05.59	Aleksandr Dzhaburiya; Soviet Union	1:05.81
200 m breaststroke	Aleksandr Dzhaburiya; Soviet Union	2:21.55	Ian McKenzie; Great Britain	2:22.05	Francesco Postiglione; Italy	2:22.25
100 m butterfly	Miloš Milošević; Yugoslavia	56.58	Mikhail Gromov; Soviet Union	57.30	Christian Keller; West Germany	57.79
200 m butterfly	Christian Keller; West Germany	2:07.51	Marek Klechamer; Poland	2:08.04	Christian Robinson; Great Britain	2:08.26
200 m individual medley	Sergey Grabalin; Soviet Union	2:07.55	Paul Pederzolli; Great Britain	2:08.88	Ralf Domschke; East Germany	2:09.33
400 m individual medley	Sergey Grabalin; Soviet Union	4:31.30	Ralf Domschke; East Germany	4:36.91	Christian Dahle; East Germany	4:37.79
4 × 100 m freestyle relay	Soviet Union	3:27.85	Great Britain	3:31.88	West Germany	3:32.59
4 × 200 m freestyle relay	Soviet Union	7:36.55	East Germany	7:43.90	West Germany	7:45.40
4 × 100 m medley relay	Soviet Union	3:51.61	Italy	3:55.52	Great Britain	3:57.14

=== Girl's events ===
Event	Gold		Silver		Bronze	
50 m freestyle	Simone Hellmer; East Germany	26.46	Elena Kurchina; Soviet Union	26.55	Inge de Bruijn; Netherlands	26.56
100 m freestyle	Livia Copariu; Romania	56.76	Simone Hellmer; East Germany	56.98	Stephanie Ortwig; West Germany	56.98
200 m freestyle	Stephanie Ortwig; West Germany	1:59.92^{CR}	Janin Rotemund; East Germany	2:03.16	Grit Müller; East Germany	2:04.42
400 m freestyle	Stephanie Ortwig; West Germany	4:11.87	Grit Müller; East Germany	4:15.65	Jana Henke; East Germany	4:17.75
800 m freestyle	Grit Müller; East Germany	8:40.95	Judit Csabai; Hungary	8:43.22	Jana Henke; East Germany	8:47.33
100 m backstroke	Krisztina Egerszegi; Hungary	1:02.87	Tünde Szabó; Hungary	1:03.99	Sandra Völker; West Germany	1:04.95
200 m backstroke	Krisztina Egerszegi; Hungary	2:13.69^{CR}	Tünde Szabó; Hungary	2:17.46	Sandra Völker; West Germany	2:18.37
100 m breaststroke	Gabrielle Csepe; Hungary	1:10.77	Daniela Brendel; East Germany	1:11.63	Suela Knipphals; East Germany	1:11.83
200 m breaststroke	Daniela Brendel; East Germany	2:31.13	Yelena Rudkovskaya; Soviet Union	2:31.88	Jilie Hristova; Soviet Union	2:32.85
100 m butterfly	Jacqueline Jacob; East Germany	1:01.53	Susanne Müller; East Germany	1:02.01	Inge de Bruijn; Netherlands	1:03.41
200 m butterfly	Peggy Conrad; East Germany	2:14.14	Susanne Müller; East Germany	2:15.15	Corina Dumitru; Romania	2:18.50
200 m individual medley	Krisztina Egerszegi; Hungary	2:17.96	Diana Block; East Germany	2:18.87	Sabine Herbst; East Germany	2:19.95
400 m individual medley	Grit Müller; East Germany	4:49.53	Sabine Herbst; East Germany	4:53.17	Diana Ureche; Romania	4:57.60
4 × 100 m freestyle relay	East Germany	3:51.17	Soviet Union	3:52.53	West Germany	3:54.37
4 × 200 m freestyle relay	East Germany	8:14.73	West Germany	8:22.23	Soviet Union	8:23.12
4 × 100 m medley relay	East Germany	4:16.46	West Germany	4:18.59	Soviet Union	4:19.07
