= 1991 World Aquatics Championships =

Aquatic sports competition

6th FINA World Championships
- Host city: Perth, Western Australia
- Date(s): 3–13 January 1991

The 1991 World Aquatics Championships took place at the Claremont Superdrome in Perth, Western Australia from 3 to 13 January 1991 with 1142 participating athletes.

== Medal table ==
Place	Nation	1st place, gold medalist(s)	2nd place, silver medalist(s)	3rd place, bronze medalist(s)	Total
1	United States	17	11	6	34
2	China	8	3	2	13
3	Hungary	5	2	2	9
4	Germany	4	9	9	22
5	Australia	3	5	2	10
6	Netherlands	2	1	1	4
7	Soviet Union	1	3	6	10
8	Canada	1	3	1	5
9	Italy	1	2	4	7
10	Spain	1	1	1	3
11	Suriname	1	0	0	1
11	Yugoslavia	1	0	0	1
13	Japan	0	2	3	5
14	France	0	2	1	3
15	Great Britain	0	1	1	2
16	Sweden	0	1	0	1
17	Denmark	0	0	2	2
17	Poland	0	0	2	2
19	Czechoslovakia	0	0	1	1
Total		45	46	44	135

== Medal summary ==
=== Diving ===
Men

Event	Gold	Silver	Bronze
1 m springboard	Edwin Jongejans (NED)	Mark Lenzi (USA)	Wang Yijie (CHN)
3 m springboard	Kent Ferguson (USA)	Tan Liangde (CHN)	Albin Killat (GER)
10 m platform	Sun Shuwei (CHN)	Xiong Ni (CHN)	Georgiy Chogovadze (URS)

Women

Event	Gold	Silver	Bronze
1 m springboard	Gao Min (CHN)	Wendy Lucero (USA)	Heidemarie Bártová (TCH)
3 m springboard	Gao Min (CHN)	Irina Lashko (URS)	Brita Baldus (GER)
10 m platform	Fu Mingxia (CHN)	Yelena Miroshina (URS)	Wendy Lian Williams (USA)

=== Open water swimming ===
Men

Event	Gold	Silver	Bronze
25 km	Chad Hundeby (USA)	Sergio Chariandini (ITA)	David O'Brien (AUS)

Women

Event	Gold	Silver	Bronze
25 km	Shelley Taylor-Smith (AUS)	Martha Jahn (USA)	Karen Burton (USA)

=== Swimming ===
Men

Event	Gold	Silver	Bronze
50 m freestyle	Tom Jager (USA)	Matt Biondi (USA)	Gennadiy Prigoda (URS)
100 m freestyle	Matt Biondi (USA)	Tommy Werner (SWE)	Giorgio Lamberti (ITA)
200 m freestyle	Giorgio Lamberti (ITA)	Steffen Zesner (GER)	Artur Wojdat (POL)
400 m freestyle	Jörg Hoffmann (GER)	Stefan Pfeiffer (GER)	Artur Wojdat (POL)
1500 m freestyle	Jörg Hoffmann (GER)	Kieren Perkins (AUS)	Stefan Pfeiffer (GER)
100 m backstroke	Jeff Rouse (USA)	Mark Tewksbury (CAN)	Martin López (ESP)
200 m backstroke	Martin López (ESP)	Stefano Battistelli (ITA)	Vladimir Selkov (URS)
100 m breaststroke	Norbert Rózsa (HUN)	Adrian Moorhouse (GBR)	Gianni Minervini (ITA)
200 m breaststroke	Mike Barrowman (USA)	Norbert Rózsa (HUN)	Nick Gillingham (GBR)
100 m butterfly	Anthony Nesty (SUR)	Michael Groß (GER)	Vladislav Kulikov (URS)
200 m butterfly	Melvin Stewart (USA)	Michael Groß (GER)	Tamás Darnyi (HUN)
200 m individual medley	Tamás Darnyi (HUN)	Eric Namesnik (USA)	Christian Geßner (GER)
400 m individual medley	Tamás Darnyi (HUN)	Eric Namesnik (USA)	Stefano Battistelli (ITA)
4 × 100 m freestyle relay	United States (USA); Tom Jager; Brent Lang; Doug Gjertsen; Matt Biondi	Germany (GER); Peter Sitt; Dirk Richter; Steffen Zesner; Bengt Zikarsky	Soviet Union (URS); Gennadiy Prigoda; Yuriy Bashkatov; Veniamin Tayanovich; Volodymyr Tkachenko
4 × 200 m freestyle relay	Germany (GER); Peter Sitt; Steffen Zesner; Stefan Pfeiffer; Michael Groß	United States (USA); Troy Dalbey; Melvin Stewart; Dan Jorgensen; Doug Gjertsen	Italy (ITA); Emanuele Idini; Roberto Gleria; Stefano Battistelli; Giorgio Lamberti
4 × 100 m medley relay	United States (USA); Jeff Rouse; Eric Wunderlich; Mark Henderson; Matt Biondi	Soviet Union (URS); Vladimir Shemetov; Dmitriy Volkov; Vladislav Kulikov; Veniamin Tayanovich	Germany (GER); Frank Hoffmeister; Christian Poswiat; Michael Groß; Dirk Richter

Women

Event	Gold	Silver	Bronze
50 m freestyle	Zhuang Yong (CHN)	Leigh Ann Fetter (USA)	—
50 m freestyle	Zhuang Yong (CHN)	Catherine Plewinski (FRA)	—
100 m freestyle	Nicole Haislett (USA)	Catherine Plewinski (FRA)	Zhuang Yong (CHN)
200 m freestyle	Hayley Lewis (AUS)	Janet Evans (USA)	Mette Jacobsen (DEN)
400 m freestyle	Janet Evans (USA)	Hayley Lewis (AUS)	Suzu Chiba (JPN)
800 m freestyle	Janet Evans (USA)	Grit Müller (GER)	Jana Henke (GER)
100 m backstroke	Krisztina Egerszegi (HUN)	Tünde Szabó (HUN)	Janie Wagstaff (USA)
200 m backstroke	Krisztina Egerszegi (HUN)	Dagmar Hase (GER)	Janie Wagstaff (USA)
100 m breaststroke	Linley Frame (AUS)	Jana Dörries (GER)	Yelena Volkova (URS)
200 m breaststroke	Yelena Volkova (URS)	Linley Frame (AUS)	Jana Dörries (GER)
100 m butterfly	Hong Qian (CHN)	Wang Xiaohong (CHN)	Catherine Plewinski (FRA)
200 m butterfly	Summer Sanders (USA)	Rie Shito (JPN)	Hayley Lewis (AUS)
200 m individual medley	Lin Li (CHN)	Summer Sanders (USA)	Daniela Hunger (GER)
400 m individual medley	Lin Li (CHN)	Hayley Lewis (AUS)	Summer Sanders (USA)
4 × 100 m freestyle relay	United States (USA); Nicole Haislett; Julie Cooper; Whitney Hedgepeth; Jenny Thompson	Germany (GER); Simone Osygus; Kerstin Kielgaß; Karen Seick; Manuela Stellmach	Netherlands (NED); Mildred Muis; Inge de Bruijn; Marianne Muis; Karin Brienesse
4 × 200 m freestyle relay	Germany (GER); Kerstin Kielgaß; Manuela Stellmach; Dagmar Hase; Stephanie Ortwig	Netherlands (NED); Marianne Muis; Manon Masseurs; Mildred Muis; Karin Brienesse	Denmark (DEN); Gitta Jensen; Berit Puggaard; Annette Povlsen; Mette Jacobsen
4 × 100 m medley relay	United States (USA); Janie Wagstaff; Tracey McFarlane; Crissy Ahmann-Leighton; Nicole Haislett	Australia (AUS); Nicole Livingstone; Linley Frame; Susie O'Neill; Karen van Wirdum	Germany (GER); Svenja Schlicht; Jana Dörries; Susanne Müller; Manuela Stellmach

=== Synchronised swimming ===
Event	Gold	Silver	Bronze
Solo routine	Sylvie Fréchette (CAN)	Kristen Babb-Sprague (USA)	Mikako Kotani (JPN)
Duet routine	Karen Josephson (USA); Sarah Josephson (USA)	Mikako Kotani (JPN); Aki Takayama (JPN)	Lisa Alexander (CAN); Kathy Glen (CAN)
Team routine	United States (USA)	Canada (CAN)	Japan (JPN)

=== Water polo ===
Men

Event	Gold	Silver	Bronze
Team	Yugoslavia	Spain	Hungary

Women

Event	Gold	Silver	Bronze
Team	Netherlands	Canada	United States

== Participating nations ==
- Algeria (2)
- Argentina (4)
- Australia (88)
- Austria (3)
- Bahamas (1)
- Belgium (9)
- Brazil (31)
- Bulgaria (2)
- Canada (77)
- China (47)
- Chinese Taipei (7)
- Costa Rica (1)
- Cuba (15)
- Czechoslovakia (4)
- Denmark (10)
- Egypt (17)
- Finland (3)
- France (55)
- Germany (80)
- Great Britain (29)
- Greece (19)
- Guam (6)
- Hong Kong (2)
- Hungary (44)
- India (2)
- Indonesia (15)
- Ireland (4)
- Israel (5)
- Italy (45)
- Japan (24)
- Kuwait (1)
- Lebanon (1)
- Luxembourg (4)
- Macau (3)
- Malaysia (1)
- Mexico (19)
- Netherlands (41)
- New Zealand (46)
- North Korea (4)
- Northern Mariana Islands (2)
- Norway (12)
- Poland (6)
- Portugal (7)
- Puerto Rico (5)
- Romania (19)
- San Marino (7)
- Singapore (5)
- South Korea (5)
- Soviet Union (51)
- Spain (35)
- Suriname (1)
- Sweden (22)
- Switzerland (16)
- Turkey (2)
- United States (90)
- Uruguay (2)
- Venezuela (1)
- Yugoslavia (29)
- Zimbabwe (2)
