= Swimming at the 1992 Summer Olympics – Women's 100 metre freestyle =

Women's 100 Metre Freestyle at the Games of the XXV Olympiad
- Venue: Piscines Bernat Picornell
- Date: 26 July 1992 (heats & finals)
- Competitors: 48 from 34 nations
- Winning time: 54.64 OR

Medalists
1st place, gold medalist(s)		Zhuang Yong	China
2nd place, silver medalist(s)		Jenny Thompson	United States
3rd place, bronze medalist(s)		Franziska van Almsick	Germany

The Women's 100 Metre Freestyle event at the 1992 Summer Olympics took place on 26 July at the Piscines Bernat Picornell in Barcelona, Spain.

== Records ==
Prior to this competition, the existing world and Olympic records were as follows.

World record	Jenny Thompson (USA)	54.48	Indianapolis, United States	1 March 1992
Olympic record	Barbara Krause (GDR)	54.79	Moscow, Soviet Union	21 July 1980

The following records were established during the competition:

Date	Round	Name	Nationality	Time	Record
26 July	Heat 6	Jenny Thompson	United States	54.69	OR
26 July	Final A	Zhuang Yong	China	54.64	OR

== Results ==
=== Heats ===
Rule: The eight fastest swimmers advance to final A (Q), while the next eight to final B (q).

Rank	Heat	Lane	Name	Nationality	Time	Notes
1	6	4	Jenny Thompson	United States	54.69	Q, OR
2	6	5	Franziska van Almsick	Germany	55.40	Q
3	6	6	Catherine Plewinski	France	55.44	Q
4	5	4	Nicole Haislett	United States	55.67	Q
5	4	4	Zhuang Yong	China	55.78	Q
6	6	2	Le Jingyi	China	55.87	Q
7	4	5	Karin Brienesse	Netherlands	55.98	Q
7	5	3	Simone Osygus	Germany	55.98	Q
9	5	6	Suzu Chiba	Japan	56.26	q, NR
10	6	8	Yelena Shubina	Unified Team	56.31	q
11	5	7	Luminița Dobrescu	Romania	56.45	q
12	6	3	Gitta Jensen	Denmark	56.47	q
13	5	5	Susie O'Neill	Australia	56.58	q
14	4	6	Mildred Muis	Netherlands	56.67	q
14	5	1	Yevgeniya Yermakova	Unified Team	56.67	q
16	5	2	Andrea Nugent	Canada	56.82	q
17	4	3	Karen Pickering	Great Britain	57.17	
18	6	7	Martina Moravcová	Czechoslovakia	57.19	
19	4	1	Eva Nyberg	Sweden	57.36	
20	3	5	Marianne Kriel	South Africa	57.50	
21	3	1	Claudia Franco	Spain	57.57	
22	4	7	Ayako Nakano	Japan	57.71	
23	6	1	Ellenor Svensson	Sweden	58.03	
24	3	8	Minna Salmela	Finland	58.04	NR
25	4	8	Allison Higson	Canada	58.47	
26	3	2	Natalia Pulido	Spain	58.54	
27	3	3	Mette Nielsen	Denmark	58.67	
28	4	2	Karen van Wirdum	Australia	58.75	
29	5	8	Toni Jeffs	New Zealand	58.80	
30	2	5	Rania Elwani	Egypt	58.82	
31	3	4	Alison Sheppard	Great Britain	58.83	
31	3	7	Diana Ureche	Romania	58.83	
33	1	5	Joscelin Yeo	Singapore	58.93	
34	2	7	Akiko Thomson	Philippines	59.02	
35	2	4	Monica Dahl	Namibia	59.05	
36	3	6	Ilaria Sciorelli	Italy	59.11	
37	1	4	Robyn Lamsam	Hong Kong	59.26	
38	2	8	Marja Pärssinen	Finland	59.46	
39	2	7	Shelley Cramer	Virgin Islands	59.99	NR
40	2	2	Helga Sigurðardóttir	Iceland	1:00.29	
41	2	1	Ana Alegria	Portugal	1:00.35	
42	1	2	Joshua Ikhaghomi	Nigeria	1:00.72	
43	2	3	Ratiporn Wong	Thailand	1:00.85	
44	1	6	Corinne Leclair	Mauritius	1:00.95	
45	1	7	Sharon Pickering	Fiji	1:01.42	
46	1	3	Ana Joselina Fortin	Honduras	1:01.50	
47	1	1	Paola Peñarrieta	Bolivia	1:04.08	
48	1	8	Elsa Freire	Angola	1:05.45	

=== Finals ===
==== Final B ====
Rank	Lane	Name	Nationality	Time	Notes
9	4	Suzu Chiba	Japan	55.97	NR
10	3	Luminița Dobrescu	Romania	56.17	
11	5	Yelena Shubina	Unified Team	56.19	
12	6	Gitta Jensen	Denmark	56.59	
13	7	Mildred Muis	Netherlands	56.64	
14	1	Yevgeniya Yermakova	Unified Team	56.66	
15	2	Susie O'Neill	Australia	56.68	
16	8	Andrea Nugent	Canada	56.91	

==== Final A ====
Rank	Lane	Name	Nationality	Time	Notes
1st place, gold medalist(s)	2	Zhuang Yong	China	54.64	OR
2nd place, silver medalist(s)	4	Jenny Thompson	United States	54.84	
3rd place, bronze medalist(s)	5	Franziska van Almsick	Germany	54.94	
4	6	Nicole Haislett	United States	55.19	
5	3	Catherine Plewinski	France	55.72	
6	7	Le Jingyi	China	55.89	
7	1	Simone Osygus	Germany	55.93	
8	8	Karin Brienesse	Netherlands	56.59	
