= Semenyuk =

Semenyuk or Semeniuk (Ukrainian: Семенюк) is a Ukrainian surname. The surname is also used by Poles and Belarusians. Notable people with the surname include:

- Andrey Semenyuk (born 1971), Belarusian diver
- Kamil Semeniuk (born 1996), Polish volleyball player
- Karolina Semeniuk-Olchawa (born 1983), Polish handball player
- Oleksandr Semenyuk (born 1987), Ukrainian footballer
- Serhiy Semenyuk (born 1991), Ukrainian footballer
- Valentyna Semenyuk-Samsonenko (1957–2014), Ukrainian politician
- Vasyl Semeniuk (born 1949), Ukrainian bishop
- Yurii Semeniuk (born 1994), Ukrainian volleyball player
- Alexander Semenyuk (born 1986), Ukrainian fiction author
