= Davide Lorenzini =

Italian diver (born 1969)

Personal information
- Born: 8 August 1969 (age 56) Verona, Italy
Medal record
Men's diving
Representing Italy
European Championships
| Bronze medal – third place | 1991 Athens | 3 m springboard |

Davide Lorenzini (born 8 August 1969, in Verona) is an Italian retired diver.

== Biography ==
He is best known for winning the bronze medal in the men's 3 m springboard at the 1991 European Championships in Athens, Greece. Lorenzini represented his native country in two consecutive Summer Olympics, starting in 1992 (Barcelona, Spain). He was affiliated with the Carabinieri during his career.
