= Janie Wagstaff =

American swimmer (born 1974)

Personal information
- Full name: Elizabeth Jane Wagstaff
- National team: United States
- Born: July 22, 1974 (age 51) Kansas City, Missouri, U.S.
- Height: 5 ft 11 in (1.80 m)
- Weight: 146 lb (66 kg)

Sport
- Sport: Swimming
- Strokes: Backstroke
- College team: University of Florida
Medal record
Women's swimming
Representing the United States
Olympic Games
Gold medal – first place	1992 Barcelona	4x100 m medley
World Championships (LC)
Gold medal – first place	1991 Perth	4×100 m medley
Bronze medal – third place	1991 Perth	100 m backstroke
Bronze medal – third place	1991 Perth	200 m backstroke
Pan Pacific Championships
Gold medal – first place	1991 Edmonton	4x100 m medley
Gold medal – first place	1991 Edmonton	100 m backstroke
Bronze medal – third place	1991 Edmonton	200 m backstroke

Elizabeth Jane "Janie" Wagstaff (born July 22, 1974) is an American former competition swimmer and Olympic champion.

Wagstaff was born in Kansas City, Missouri.

Wagstaff appeared on the international swimming stage when she took third place in both the 100-meter and 200-meter backstroke events at the 1991 World Aquatics Championships in Perth, Australia. At the 1992 Summer Olympics in Barcelona, Spain, Wagstaff earned a gold medal by swimming for the winning U.S. team in the preliminary heats of the 4×100-meter medley relay.

Wagstaff accepted an athletic scholarship to attend the University of Florida in Gainesville, Florida, where she swam for coach Mitch Ivey and coach Chris Martin's Florida Gators swimming and diving team in National Collegiate Athletic Association (NCAA) competition in 1993 and 1994. Wagstaff was a member of the Gators' NCAA championship 4×100-meter medley relay in 1994, together with teammates Shannon Price, Ashley Tappin and Nicole Haislett, and won five Southeastern Conference (SEC) individual championships and five SEC titles as a member of winning Gators relay teams. During her two-year career as a Gator swimmer, she received eleven All-American honors.

Wagstaff left the University of Florida in September 1994 to train full-time for the 1996 Summer Olympics.

== See also ==
- List of Olympic medalists in swimming (women)
- List of University of Florida alumni
- List of University of Florida Olympians
- List of World Aquatics Championships medalists in swimming (women)
