= Ellen Elzerman =

Dutch swimmer (born 1971)

Personal information
- Born: 22 January 1971 (age 55)
Medal record
Women's swimming
Representing the Netherlands
European Championships (LC)
Bronze medal – third place	1989 Bonn	4×100 m medley relay
Bronze medal – third place	1991 Athens	4×200 freestyle relay
Bronze medal – third place	1991 Athens	4×100 medley relay

Ellen Louise Elzerman (born 22 January 1971 in Bussum, North Holland) is a former backstroke and freestyle swimmer from the Netherlands, who competed for her native country at the 1992 Summer Olympics in Barcelona, Spain. There she was eliminated in the heats of the 100 m and 200 m backstroke. In the 4×100 m medley relay she finished in eighth position with the Dutch Team, after gaining the bronze medal in the same event one year earlier at the European Championships in Athens, Greece.
