= Emanuele Idini =

Italian swimmer (born 1970)

Medal record

Representing Italy

Men's swimming

European Championships (LC)
Silver medal – second place	1991 Athens	4×200 m freestyle
Bronze medal – third place	1995 Vienna	4×200 m freestyle

Emanuele Idini (born 18 December 1970 in Rome) is a retired freestyle swimmer from Italy, who represented his native country at two consecutive Summer Olympics: the 1992 Summer Olympics and the 1996 Summer Olympics.

He won the silver medal in the men's 4×200 m freestyle at the 1991 European Aquatics Championships, alongside Roberto Gleria, Stefano Battistelli, and Giorgio Lamberti. Four years later in Vienna, Austria he was a member of the team that claimed the bronze medal in the same event, partnering Massimiliano Rosolino, Emanuele Merisi, and Piermaria Siciliano.
