= 1991 European Aquatics Championships =

Water sport competitions

20th European Aquatics Championships
- Host city: Athens, Greece
- Date: 18–25 August 1991
- Events: 47

The 1991 European Aquatics Championships was a water sport competition hosted in Athens, Greece from 18–25 August.

== Medal table ==
* Host nation (Greece)

Rank	Nation	Gold	Silver	Bronze	Total
1	Soviet Union	16	7	2	25
2	Germany	7	12	11	30
3	Hungary	6	3	2	11
4	Denmark	4	0	2	6
5	France	3	5	3	11
6	Italy	2	4	11	17
7	Spain	2	2	1	5
8	Norway	2	0	0	2
9	Netherlands	1	3	6	10
10	Great Britain	1	2	2	5
11	Poland	1	2	1	4
12	Switzerland	1	1	1	3
13	Yugoslavia	1	0	0	1
14	Romania	0	4	1	5
15	Sweden	0	1	2	3
16	Czechoslovakia	0	1	0	1
16	Greece*	0	1	0	1
18	Bulgaria	0	0	2	2
Totals (18 entries)		47	48	47	142

== Swimming ==
=== Men's events ===
Event	Gold		Silver		Bronze	
50 m freestyle	Nils Rudolph (GER)	22.33	Gennadiy Prigoda (URS)	22.44	Mike Fibbens (GBR); Vladimir Tkacenko (URS)	22.72; 22.72
100 m freestyle	Alexander Popov (URS)	49.18	Nils Rudolph (GER)	49.52	Giorgio Lamberti (ITA)	49.57
200 m freestyle	Artur Wojdat (POL)	1:48.10	Giorgio Lamberti (ITA)	1:48.15	Roberto Gleria (ITA)	1:48.74
400 m freestyle	Yevgeny Sadovyi (URS)	3:49.02	Artur Wojdat (POL)	3:49.09	Giorgio Lamberti (ITA)	3:50.46
1500 m freestyle	Jörg Hoffmann (GER)	15:02.57	Ian Wilson (GBR)	15:03.72	Sebastian Wiese (GER)	15:14.30
100 m backstroke	Martin López-Zubero (ESP)	55.30	Dirk Richter (GER)	56.04	Franck Schott (FRA)	56.29
200 m backstroke	Martin López-Zubero (ESP)	1:58.66	Dirk Richter (GER); Vladimir Selkov (URS)	2:00.18; 2:00.18		
100 m breaststroke	Norbert Rózsa (HUN)	1:01.49	Adrian Moorhouse (GBR)	1:01.88	Gianni Minervini (ITA)	1:02.41
200 m breaststroke	Nick Gillingham (GBR)	2:12.55	Norbert Rózsa (HUN)	2:12.58	Sergio López (ESP)	2:13.40
100 m butterfly	Vladislav Kulikov (URS)	54.22	Martin López-Zubero (ESP)	54.30	Nils Rudolph (GER)	54.31
200 m butterfly	Franck Esposito (FRA)	1:59.59	Rafał Szukała (POL)	2:01.01	Christophe Bordeau (FRA)	2:01.25
200 m individual medley	Lars Sørensen (DEN)	2:02.63	Christian Gessner (GER)	2:02.66	Luca Sacchi (ITA)	2:02.93
400 m individual medley	Luca Sacchi (ITA)	4:17.81	Patrick Kühl (GER)	4:17.85	Christian Gessner (GER)	4:19.16
4 × 100 m freestyle relay	Soviet Union; Pavel Khnykin; Gennadiy Prigoda; Venyamin Tayanovich; Alexander Popov	3:17.11	Germany; Silko Günzel; Nils Rudolph; Steffen Zesner; Dirk Richter	3:18.31	Sweden; Tommy Werner; Göran Titus; Anders Holmertz; Göran Jansson	3:20.42
4 × 200 m freestyle relay	Soviet Union; Dmitri Lepikov; Vladimir Pyshnenko; Venyamin Tayanovich; Yevgeny Sadovyi	7:15.96	Italy; Emanuele Idini; Roberto Gleria; Stefano Battistelli; Giorgio Lamberti	7:18.30	Germany; Steffen Zesner; Uwe Daßler; Christian Keller; Jörg Hoffmann	7:19.13
4 × 100 m medley relay	Soviet Union; Vladimir Selkov; Dmitri Volkov; Vladislav Kulikov; Alexander Popov	3:40.68	France; Franck Schott; Cédric Penicaud; Bruno Gutzeit; Christophe Kalfayan	3:42.15	Hungary; Tamás Deutsch; Norbert Rózsa; Péter Horváth; Béla Szabados	3:42.35

=== Women's events ===
Event	Gold		Silver		Bronze	
50 m freestyle	Simone Osygus (GER)	25,80	Catherine Plewinski (FRA)	25,84	Inge de Bruijn (NED)	25,91
100 m freestyle	Catherine Plewinski (FRA)	56,20	Karin Brienesse (NED)	56,44	Simone Osygus (GER)	56,47
200 m freestyle	Mette Jacobsen (DEN)	2.00,29	Catherine Plewinski (FRA)	2.00,34	Luminiţa Dobrescu (ROM)	2.01,77
400 m freestyle	Irene Dalby (NOR)	4.11,63	Beatrice Câșlaru (ROM)	4.12,33	Cristina Sossi (ITA)	4.12,35
800 m freestyle	Irene Dalby (NOR)	8.32,08	Jana Henke (GER)	8.32,25	Cristina Sossi (ITA)	8.33,79
100 m backstroke	Krisztina Egerszegi (HUN)	1.00,31	Tünde Szabó (HUN)	1.01,11	Dagmar Hase (GER)	1.02,41
200 m backstroke	Krisztina Egerszegi (HUN)	2.06,62	Tünde Szabó (HUN)	2.11,42	Dagmar Hase (GER)	2.12,21
100 m breaststroke	Elena Roudkovskaya (URS)	1.09,05	Svetlana Bondarenko (URS)	1.09,99	Tanya Dangalakova (BUL)	1.10,12
200 m breaststroke	Elena Roudkovskaya (URS)	2.29,50	Beatrice Câșlaru (ROM)	2.32,00	Tanya Dangalakova (BUL)	2.32,09
100 m butterfly	Catherine Plewinski (FRA)	1.00,32	Inge de Bruijn (NED)	1.01,64	Therèse Lundin (SWE)	1.01,80
200 m butterfly	Mette Jacobsen (DEN)	2.12,87	Sabine Herbst (GER)	2.14,72	Berit Puggaard (DEN)	2.14,80
200 m individual medley	Daniela Hunger (GER)	2.15,53	Beatrice Câșlaru (ROM)	2.16,68	Marion Zoller (GER)	2.17,43
400 m individual medley	Krisztina Egerszegi (HUN)	4.39,78	Beatrice Câșlaru (ROM)	4.44,67	Ewa Synowska (POL)	4.47,92
4 × 100 m freestyle relay	Netherlands; Diana van der Plaats; Inge de Bruijn; Marieke Mastenbroek; Karin Brienesse	3.45,36	Germany; Dagmar Hase; Sylvia Gerasch; Katrin Meissner; Simone Osygus	3.45,54	Denmark; Mette Nielsen; Gitta Jensen; Berit Puggaard; Mette Jacobsen	3.46,36
4 × 200 m freestyle relay	Denmark; Annette Poulsen; Gitta Jensen; Berit Puggaard; Mette Jacobsen	8.05,90	Germany; Dagmar Hase; Manuela Stellmach; Simone Osygus; Heike Friedrich	8.10,26	Netherlands; Ellen Elzerman; Baukje Wiersma; Diana van der Plaats; Karin Brienesse	8.13,97
4 × 100 m medley relay	Soviet Union; Natalya Krupskaya; Elena Roudkovskaya; Elena Kononenko; Yevgeniya Yermakova	4.08,55	Germany; Dagmar Hase; Sylvia Gerasch; Katrin Meissner; Simone Osygus	4.10,10	Netherlands; Ellen Elzerman; Kira Bulten; Inge de Bruijn; Karin Brienesse	4.14,03

== Open water swimming ==
- Held in Terracina, Italy from 14–15 September.

=== Men's events ===
Event	Gold		Silver		Bronze	
5 km open water	Stefano Rubaudo (ITA)	1:06:51,7	Davide Giacchino (ITA)	1:07:22,3	Hans van Goor (NED)	1:07:38,4
25 km open water	Christof Wandratsch (GER)	5:46:26,2	Sergio Chiarandini (ITA)	5:56:50,2	Urs Kohlhaas (SUI)	5:58:50,1

=== Women's events ===
Event	Gold		Silver		Bronze	
5 km open water	Bea Berzlanovits (HUN)	1:13:51,2	Yvetta Hlaváčová (TCH)	1:14:13,4	Mara Data (ITA)	1:14:13,7
25 km open water	Eliane Fieschi (SUI)	6:38:58,8	Samantha Cavadini (SUI)	6:54:27,7	Rita Kovács (HUN)	6:57:29,5

== Diving ==
=== Men's events ===
Event	Gold		Silver		Bronze	
1 m springboard	Andrey Semenyuk (URS)	395.19	Peter Böhler (GER)	383.76	Edwin Jongejans (NED)	359.64
3 m springboard	Albin Killat (GER)	639.45	Joakim Andersson (SWE)	597.03	Davide Lorenzini (ITA)	596.28
10 m platform	Vladimir Timoshinin (URS)	606.21	Dmitri Sautin (URS)	602.22	Bobby Morgan (GBR)	578.67

=== Women's events ===
Event	Gold		Silver		Bronze	
1 m springboard	Brita Baldus (GER)	282.54	Irina Lashko (URS)	269.52	Conny Schmalfuss (GER)	238.50
3 m springboard	Irina Lashko (URS)	524.97	Vera Ilyina (URS)	513.03	Brita Baldus (GER)	498.03
10 m platform	Yelena Miroshina (URS)	453.90	Inga Afonina (URS)	423.39	Ute Wetzig (GER)	382.47

== Synchronized swimming ==
Event	Gold		Silver		Bronze	
Solo	Olga Sedakova (URS)	180.286	Christina Thalassinidou (GRE)	178.800	Anne Capron (FRA)	175.820
Duet	Anna Kozlova (URS); Olga Sedakova (URS)	179.572	Anne Capron (FRA); Céline Leveque (FRA)	174.729	Marjolijn Both (NED); Tamara Zwart (NED)	173.351
Team competition	Soviet Union (URS); Vera Artyomova; Elena Azarova; Victoria Bashkaeva; Elena Dolzhenko; Anna Kozlova; Gana Maximova; Olga Pilipchuk; Olga Sedakova	178.112	France (FRA); Anne Capron; Marie Caranta; Clarisse Chesneau; Delphine Le Floch; Celine Leveque; Myriam Lignot; Isabelle Manable; Delphine Marechal	173.753	Italy (ITA); Giada Ballan; Giovanna Burlando; Manuela Carnini; Paola Celli; Simona Della Bella; Roberta Farinelli; Loredana Gentilezza; Roberta Guidi	171.889

== Water polo ==
=== Men's event ===
Event	Gold	Silver	Bronze
Team competition	Yugoslavia	Spain	Soviet Union

=== Women's event ===
Event	Gold	Silver	Bronze
Team competition	Hungary	Netherlands	Italy
