= Jana Dörries =

German swimmer (born 1975)

Olympic medal record

Representing Germany

Olympic Games
Silver medal – second place	1992 Barcelona	4x100 m medley relay

World Championships (LC)
Bronze medal – third place	1991 Perth	200 m breaststroke

Jana Dörries (born 24 September 1975 in Potsdam) is a German former swimmer who competed in the 1992 Summer Olympics.

== Career ==
Germany won Silver 4 x 100 metres Medley Relay, Women with participation of Dagmar Hase, Jana Dörries, Franziska van Almsick, Daniela Hunger. Jana also won bronze at 1991 World Aquatics Championships in 200m breaststroke.
