= Gabriella Csépe =

Hungarian swimmer

Personal information
- Full name: Csépe Gabriella
- Nationality: Hungarian
- Born: June 13, 1973 (age 53) Gyöngyös, Heves
- Height: 1.70 m (5 ft 7 in)
- Weight: 56 kg (123 lb)

Sport
- Sport: Swimming
- Strokes: Breaststroke
- Club: Budapesti Vasutas Sport Club
Medal record
European Junior Championship (LC)
Gold medal – first place	1988 Amersfoort	100 m breaststroke

Gabriella Csépe (born June 13, 1973, in Gyöngyös) is a former breaststroke swimmer from Hungary, who competed in two consecutive Summer Olympics for her native country, starting at the 1988.

Her best Olympic results came in 1992, when she finished in sixth (100 m Breaststroke) and in ninth (200 m Breaststroke) position. She also competed for American University during her NCAA career. She graduated with honors in 1996 from American University with bachelor's degree in accounting. She completed her MBA studies at Kent State University in 1998 and received her CPA license in summer of 2001. She and her husband, Ali Rezaiyan, have two children.
