= Manon Masseurs =

Dutch swimmer

Personal information
- Born: 29 April 1974 (age 52)
Medal record
Women's swimming
Representing the Netherlands
World Championships (LC)
Silver medal – second place	1991 Perth	4×200 m freestyle
Bronze medal – third place	1991 Perth	4×100 m freestyle

Manon van der Meer-Masseurs (born 29 April 1974 in Rotterdam) is a former Dutch swimmer, who was specialized in freestyle.

== See also ==
- List of swimmers
