= Andrey Semenyuk =

Belarusian Olympic diver

Personal information
- Born: March 10, 1971 (age 55) Minsk, Belarus
Medal record
Men's diving
Representing the Soviet Union
European Championships
Gold medal – first place	1991 Athens	1 m springboard

Andrey Semenyuk (Russian: Андрей Семенюк; born March 10, 1971) is a retired diver from Belarus, who won the gold medal in the Men's 1m Springboard event at the 1991 European Championships in Athens, Greece. He represented Belarus at the 1996 Summer Olympics in Atlanta, Georgia.
