= Park Mi-yeong =

South Korean swimmer

Personal information
- Born: 1 February 1976 (age 50)

Sport
- Sport: Swimming
- Strokes: Breaststroke

Park Mi-yeong (born 1 February 1976) is a retired South Korean breaststroke swimmer. She competed in two events at the 1992 Summer Olympics.
