= Tünde Szabó =

Hungarian swimmer

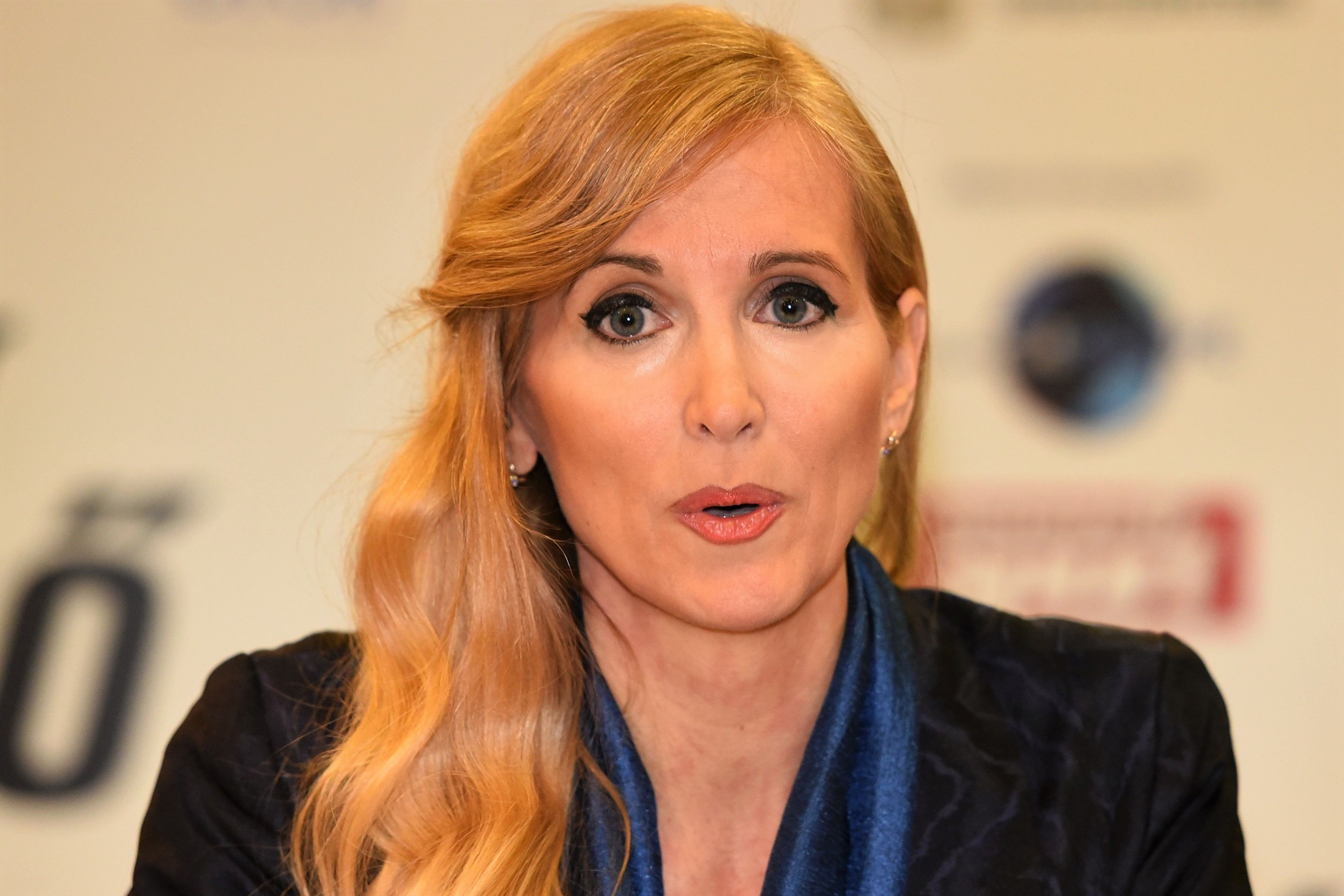
- Szabó in 2018

Secretary of State for Sports of the Ministry of Human Resources
- In office 19 September 2015 – 24 May 2022
- Minister: Zoltán Balog; Miklós Kásler
- Preceded by: István Simicskó
- Succeeded by: Ádám Schmidt
- Sports career
- Nationality: Hungary
- Born: 31 May 1974 (age 52) Nyíregyháza, Szabolcs-Szatmár-Bereg
- Height: 1.75 m (5 ft 9 in)
- Weight: 60 kg (132 lb)
- Sport: Swimming
- Strokes: Backstroke
- Club: Nyíregyházi Vasutas Sport Club
Medal record
Women's swimming
Representing Hungary
Olympic Games
Silver medal – second place	1992 Barcelona	100 m backstroke
World Championships (LC)
Silver medal – second place	1991 Perth	100 m backstroke
European Championships (LC)
Silver medal – second place	1991 Athens	100 m backstroke
Silver medal – second place	1991 Athens	200 m backstroke
European Junior Championships (LC)
Silver medal – second place	1988 Amersfoort	100 m backstroke
Silver medal – second place	1988 Amersfoort	200 m backstroke

Tünde Szabó (Note: Hungarian pronunciation: [ˈtyndɛ ˈsɒboː]) (born 31 May 1974 in Nyíregyháza, Szabolcs-Szatmár-Bereg) is a Hungarian retired female swimmer and politician.

Aged eighteen she won a silver medal at the 1992 Summer Olympics in Barcelona, one at the 1991 World Championships in Perth, and two at the 1991 European Championships in Athens. On each occasion she finished second behind fellow Hungarian swimmer, Krisztina Egerszegi.

== Political career ==
Szabó was appointed Secretary of State for Sports by minister Zoltán Balog in September 2015, replacing István Simicskó, who became Minister of Defence. She retained her position until 2022, when the secretariat was drawn under the portfolio of the Ministry of Defence.

As a candidate of the ruling party Fidesz, Szabó was elected a Member of Parliament for Nyíregyháza (Szabolcs-Szatmár-Bereg County 1st constituency) in the 2018 Hungarian parliamentary election, defeating MSZP politician Judit Csabai. She was re-elected MP for Nyíregyháza in the 2022 parliamentary election. Following the formation of the Fifth Orbán Government, Minister Tibor Navracsics appointed her government commissioner responsible for the economic development of the Northern Great Plain in May 2022. She was replaced as individual candidate for Nyíregyháza by the Fidesz presidium for the 2026 Hungarian parliamentary election. Although her name appeared in his party's national list, she did not secure a mandate.
