= Martín López-Zubero =

Spanish swimmer (born 1969)

Martin López-Zubero
Personal information
- Full name: Martín López-Zubero Purcell
- National team: Spain
- Born: April 23, 1969 (age 57) Jacksonville, Florida, U.S.
- Height: 1.88 m (6 ft 2 in)
- Weight: 78 kg (172 lb)

Sport
- Sport: Swimming
- Strokes: Backstroke
- Club: Club Natació Sabadell
- College team: University of Florida (U.S.)
Medal record
Men's swimming
Representing Spain
Olympic Games
| Gold medal – first place | Barcelona 1992 | 200 m backstroke |
World Championships
| Gold medal – first place | 1991 Perth | 200 m backstroke |
| Gold medal – first place | 1994 Rome | 100 m backstroke |
| Silver medal – second place | 1994 Rome | 200 m backstroke |
| Bronze medal – third place | 1991 Perth | 100 m backstroke |
European Championships (LC)
| Gold medal – first place | 1989 Bonn | 100 m backstroke |
| Gold medal – first place | 1991 Athens | 100 m backstroke |
| Gold medal – first place | 1991 Athens | 200 m backstroke |
| Gold medal – first place | 1993 Sheffield | 100 m backstroke |
| Gold medal – first place | 1997 Seville | 100 m backstroke |
| Silver medal – second place | 1991 Athens | 100 m butterfly |
| Silver medal – second place | 1993 Sheffield | 200 m backstroke |

Martín López-Zubero Purcell (born April 23, 1969), also known as Martin Zubero, is a former competition swimmer and Olympic gold medalist. López-Zubero was born in the United States, swam in international competition for Spain, and holds dual Spanish-American citizenship.

== Early years ==
López-Zubero was born in Jacksonville, Florida in 1969. His father Jose was born in Zaragoza, Spain, but came to the United States to study medicine. López-Zubero grew up as a member of a swimming family. His older brother, David López-Zubero, won the bronze medal in the 100-meter butterfly swimming for Spain at the 1980 Summer Olympics.

López-Zubero attended The Bolles School, a preparatory school in Jacksonville, and trained under coach Gregg Troy while swimming for the Bolles Bulldogs high school swim team. He graduated from the Bolles School in 1987.

== College swimming career ==
His older brother David and sister Julia swam for the University of Florida in Gainesville, Florida, and Lopez-Zubero accepted an athletic scholarship to attend the university, where he swam for coach Randy Reese and coach Skip Foster's Florida Gators swimming and diving teams from 1988 to 1991. While swimming for the Gators, he won four NCAA championships—the 200-meter individual medley, the 400-meter medley relay, and twice in the 200-meter backstroke—and received fifteen All-American honors. After his college swimming career, he trained under coach Ron Ballatore as a member of the Florida Aquatic Swim Team (FAST), and his older brother David served as his personal trainer and coach.

== International swimming career ==
López-Zubero swam in three Summer Olympics—1988, 1992 and 1996. He placed eleventh in the 200-meter backstroke at the 1988 Summer Olympics in Seoul, Korea, and returned four years later in the 1992 Summer Olympics in Barcelona, Spain to win the gold medal in the same event while also placing fourth in the 100-meter backstroke and seventh in the 100-meter butterfly. Four years afterward, López-Zubero finished fourth in the 100-meter backstroke and sixth in the 200-meter backstroke at the 1996 Summer Olympics in Atlanta, Georgia.

López-Zubero won world championship titles in the 200-meter backstroke at the 1991 World Aquatics Championships in Perth, Western Australia and the 100-meter backstroke at the 1994 World Aquatic Championships in Rome, Italy, and also finished third in the 100-meter backstroke in 1991 and second in the 200-meter backstroke in 1994. López-Zubero was a five-time European champion, winning the 100-meter backstroke in 1989 (Bonn), 1991 (Athens), 1993 (Sheffield) and 1997 (Seville), winning the 200-meter backstroke in 1991 and finishing as the runner-up in 1993. He also won the 100 and 200-meter backstroke events at the 1990 and 1994 Goodwill Games.

== Life after competition swimming ==
López-Zubero graduated from the University of Florida College of Health and Human Performance with a bachelor's degree in recreation in 1998. He formerly served as The Bolles School's assistant head swimming coach, and was honored as the "Florida Age Group Coach of the Year" in 1998, 1999 and 2002. Lopez-Zubero was inducted into the University of Florida Athletic Hall of Fame as a "Gator Great" in 2001, and the International Swimming Hall of Fame in 2004. López-Zubero is now the aquatics director at Episcopal School of Jacksonville in Jacksonville, Florida.

López-Zubero is married and has a son and a daughter.

== See also ==
- List of Olympic medalists in swimming (men)
- List of Spanish records in swimming
- List of University of Florida alumni
- List of University of Florida Athletic Hall of Fame members
- List of University of Florida Olympians
- List of World Aquatics Championships medalists in swimming (men)
- World record progression 200 metres backstroke
