= Yelena Rudkovskaya =

Belarusian swimmer

Personal information
- Born: April 21, 1973 (age 53) Gomel, Soviet Union

Sport
- Sport: Swimming
Medal record
Representing the Unified Team
Olympic Games
| Gold medal – first place | 1992 Barcelona | 100 m breaststroke |
| Bronze medal – third place | 1992 Barcelona | 4×100 m medley relay |
European Championships (LC)
Representing the Soviet Union
| Gold medal – first place | 1991 Athens | 100 m breaststroke |
| Gold medal – first place | 1991 Athens | 200 m breaststroke |
| Gold medal – first place | 1991 Athens | 4×100 m medley |
Representing Belarus
| Bronze medal – third place | 1993 Sheffield | 100 m breaststroke |
Summer Universiade
| Bronze medal – third place | 1993 Buffalo | 100m breaststroke |

Yelena Grigoryevna Rudkovskaya (Russian: Елена Григорьевна Рудковская, Belarusian: Алена Рыгораўна Рудкоўская, romanized: Alena Ryhoraŭna Rudkoŭskaja, born 21 April 1973) is a Belarusian swimmer and Olympic champion. She competed at the 1992 Olympic Games in Barcelona, where she received a gold medal in 100 m breaststroke, and a bronze medal in 4×100 m medley relay.
