= Rie Shito =

Japanese swimmer (born 1973)

Personal information
- Full name: Rie Shito
- Nationality: Japan
- Born: August 26, 1973 (age 52) Gunma, Japan
- Height: 1.65 m (5 ft 5 in)
- Weight: 61 kg (134 lb)

Sport
- Sport: Swimming
- Strokes: Butterfly
Medal record
Women's swimming
Representing Japan
World Championships (LC)
Silver medal – second place	1991 Perth	200m butterfly
Pan Pacific Championships
Gold medal – first place	1989 Tokyo	200m butterfly
Gold medal – first place	1993 Kobe	200m butterfly
Bronze medal – third place	1993 Kobe	4x100m medley
Asian Games
Bronze medal – third place	1990 Beijing	200 m butterfly

Rie Shito (司東 利恵, Shitō Rie; born 26 August 1973) is a Japanese former swimmer who competed in the 1992 Summer Olympics.
