= Artur Wojdat =

Polish swimmer

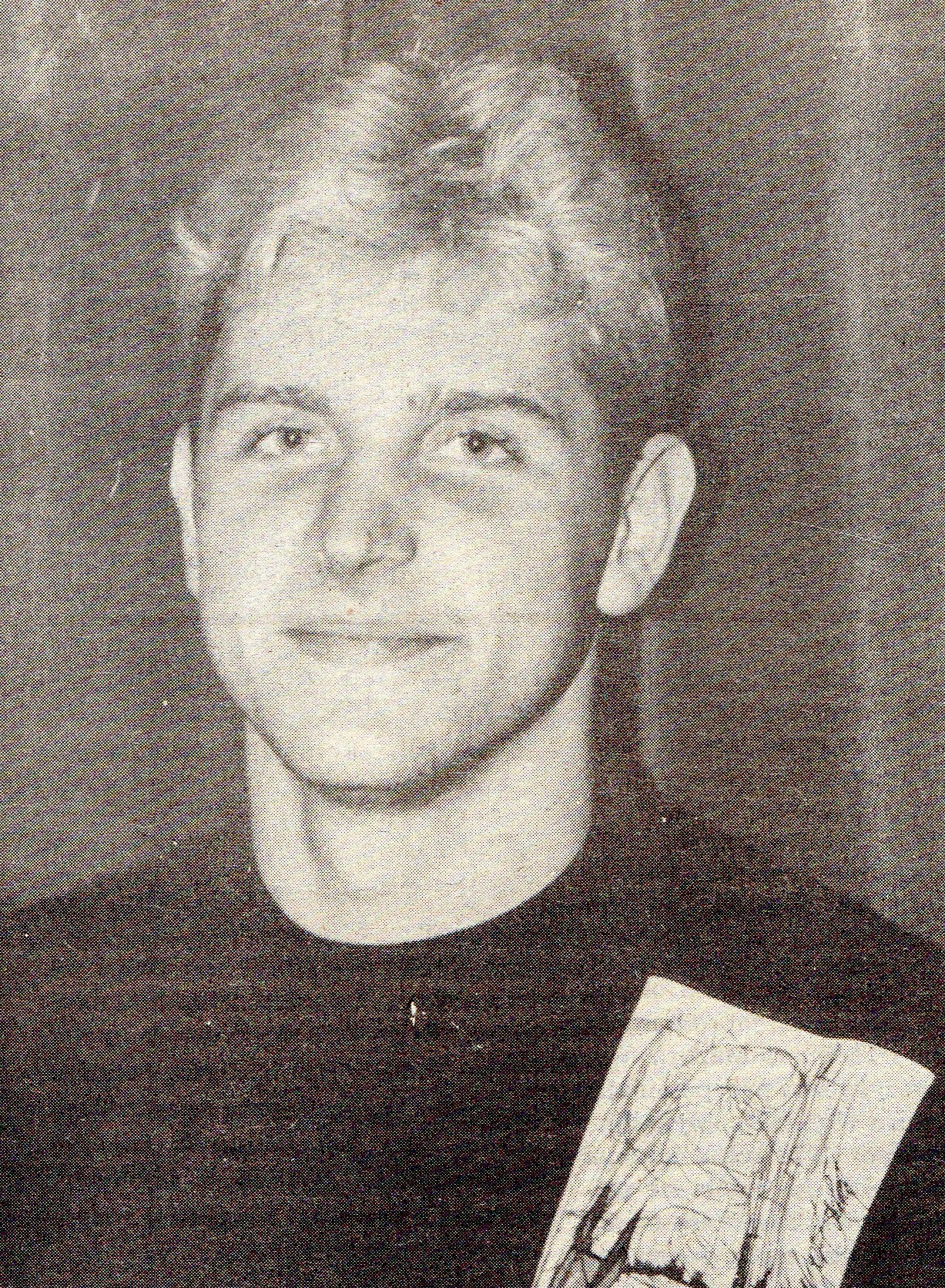
- Wojdat in 1989

Personal information
- Born: 20 May 1968 (age 58) Olsztyn, Warmian-Masurian, Poland
- Height: 1.98 m (6 ft 6 in)

Sport
- Country: Poland
- Sport: Swimming
- Strokes: Freestyle
- Club: Olimpia Poznań (POL)
- College team: Iowa Hawkeyes (USA)
Medal record
Men's swimming
Representing Poland
Event	1st	2nd	3rd
Olympic Games	0	0	1
World Championships (LC)	0	0	2
World Championships (SC)	0	1	0
European Championships (LC)	2	2	0
Universiade	1	1	0
Total	3	4	3
Olympic Games
Bronze medal – third place	1988 Seoul	400 m freestyle
World Championships (LC)
Bronze medal – third place	1991 Perth	200 m freestyle
Bronze medal – third place	1991 Perth	400 m freestyle
World Championships (SC)
Silver medal – second place	1993 Palma	200 m freestyle
European Championships (LC)
Gold medal – first place	1989 Bonn	400 m freestyle
Gold medal – first place	1991 Athens	200 m freestyle
Silver medal – second place	1989 Bonn	200 m freestyle
Silver medal – second place	1991 Athens	400 m freestyle
Universiade
Gold medal – first place	1991 Sheffield	400 m freestyle
Silver medal – second place	1991 Sheffield	200 m freestyle
Representing the Iowa Hawkeyes
Event	1st	2nd	3rd
NCAA Championships	9	2	0
Total	9	2	0
By race
Event	1st	2nd	3rd
200 y freestyle	2	2	0
500 y freestyle	4	0	0
1650 y freestyle	3	0	0
Total	9	2	0
NCAA Championships
Gold medal – first place	1989 Indianapolis	200 y freestyle
Gold medal – first place	1989 Indianapolis	500 y freestyle
Gold medal – first place	1990 Indianapolis	500 y freestyle
Gold medal – first place	1990 Indianapolis	1650 y freestyle
Gold medal – first place	1991 Austin	200 y freestyle
Gold medal – first place	1991 Austin	500 y freestyle
Gold medal – first place	1991 Austin	1650 y freestyle
Gold medal – first place	1992 Indianapolis	500 y freestyle
Gold medal – first place	1992 Indianapolis	1650 y freestyle
Silver medal – second place	1990 Indianapolis	200 y freestyle
Silver medal – second place	1992 Indianapolis	200 y freestyle

Artur Wojdat (born 20 May 1968 in Olsztyn) is a former international and collegiate swimmer from Poland, who won the bronze medal in the men's 400 meter freestyle at the 1988 Summer Olympics in Seoul, South Korea. He also competed at the 1992 Summer Olympics in Barcelona, Spain. He came to the 1988 Seoul Olympics as the world record holder in the 400 meter freestyle event. In the final he beat his world record time, but managed to only finish third behind Uwe Dassler and Duncan Armstrong.

While he missed the medal podium in the 200 metre freestyle to an American record swim by Matt Biondi, his third-place finish made him the first Polish athlete to receive a medal in a men's swimming event. After a successful collegiate swimming career at the University of Iowa, Wojdat qualified for the 1992 Summer Olympic Games, where he would compete in the 200 and 400 meter freestyle. In both events, he narrowly missed medaling, finishing in fourth place. Wojdat retired from swimming shortly after in 1992.

== College career ==
Following his success in the 1988 Seoul Olympics, Wojdat attended the University of Iowa, where he competed for the Iowa Hawkeyes swimming and diving program from 1988 to 1992. Under head coach Glenn Patton, he helped the Hawkeyes finish runner-up to the Big Ten Conference title and a top-8 finish at the 1989 NCAA Division I Men's Swimming and Diving Championships. This was the highest finish by a Hawkeye team since the 1959 NCAA swimming and diving championships, under then-head coach Robert Allen.

En-route to the top-8 finish at the 1989 NCAAs, Wojdat broke the NCAA record in the 500-yard freestyle, coming into the wall at 4:12.24. He narrowly missed repeating this feat in the 200-yard freestyle during the same NCAAs, when he finished finals with a time of 1:33.82; well within striking distance of the record time of 1:33.03 set by Matt Biondi of the California Golden Bears in 1987. Wojdat was awarded for his efforts, earning the pool record by .03 seconds. Throughout his remaining three years on the team, the Hawkeyes remained a dominant force in Big 10 swimming, which included an undefeated season in 1991 and three more top-15 finishes at the 1990, 1991, and 1992 editions of the NCAA Division I Men's Swimming and Diving Championships.

Over his four years competing for Iowa, Wojdat compiled numerous accolades, including nine individual NCAA titles split between the 200, 500, and 1650-yard freestyle; as well as being runner-up twice in the 200 freestyle in the 1990 and 1992 editions. As of 2023, Wojdat's nine individual NCAA titles rank him tied for the third-most by an NCAA collegiate swimmer ever. Additionally, his nine NCAA titles are the most by any individual Hawkeye in the entire history of their athletic programs.

== Accolades and recognition ==
For his efforts in strengthening the Hawkeye swim program during his four years, Wojdat was inducted into the University of Iowa Athletics Hall of Fame in the 2004 class. His dominant run in the mid to long-distance freestyle events at the NCAA level led him to being named by the CSCAA's (College Swimming & Diving Coaches Association of America) list of the greatest men's swimmers and divers ever at the college level in 2021.

== See also ==
- World record progression 400 metres freestyle

Records
Preceded by Michael Gross	Men's 400 metres freestyle world record holder (long course); 25 March 1988 – 23 September 1988	Succeeded by Uwe Dassler
