= Magdalena Kupiec =

Polish swimmer

Personal information
- Born: 7 October 1976 (age 48); Bytom, Poland

Sport
- Sport: Swimming

Magdalena Kupiec (born 7 October 1976) is a Polish breaststroke swimmer. She competed in two events at the 1992 Summer Olympics.
