= Vladislav Kulikov =

Russian swimmer (born 1971)

Personal information
- Full name: Владислав Куликов
- Nationality: Russian
- Born: 7 January 1971 (age 55)
- Height: 1.90 m (6 ft 3 in)
- Weight: 86 kg (190 lb)

Sport
- Sport: Swimming
- Strokes: Butterfly
- Club: Central Sport Klub Army, Moscow
Medal record
Men's swimming
Representing the Unified Team
Olympic Games
Silver medal – second place	1992 Barcelona	4×100 m medley
Representing Russia
Silver medal – second place	1996 Atlanta	4×100 m medley
Bronze medal – third place	1996 Atlanta	100 m butterfly
World Championships (LC)
Representing the Soviet Union
Silver medal – second place	1991 Perth	4x100 m medley
Bronze medal – third place	1991 Perth	100 m butterfly
Representing Russia
Bronze medal – third place	1998 Perth	4×100 m freestyle
Bronze medal – third place	2001 Fukuoka	4×100 m medley
European Championships (LC)
Gold medal – first place	1991 Athens	100 m butterfly
Gold medal – first place	1991 Athens	4×100 m medley
Gold medal – first place	1997 Seville	4×100 m medley
Bronze medal – third place	1999 Istanbul	4×100 m medley
World Championships (SC)
Bronze medal – third place	1993 Palma	4×100 m freestyle
European Championships (SC)
Bronze medal – third place	1991 Gelsenkirchen	50 m butterfly

Vladislav Kulikov (Russian: Владислав Куликов; born 7 January 1971) is a former butterfly swimmer from Russia, who won the bronze medal in the men's 200 m butterfly at the 1996 Summer Olympics in Atlanta, Georgia. He also competed at the Barcelona Games (1992), as a member of the Unified Team.
