= Berit Puggaard =

Danish swimmer (born 1972)

Personal information
- Born: Berit Raith Puggaard; 11 December 1972 (age 53) Copenhagen, Denmark
Medal record
Women's swimming
Representing Denmark
World Championships (LC)
Bronze medal – third place	1991 Perth	4 × 200 m freestyle
European Championships (LC)
Gold medal – first place	1991 Athens	4 × 200 m freestyle
Bronze medal – third place	1991 Athens	200 m butterfly
Bronze medal – third place	1991 Athens	4 × 100 m freestyle
Bronze medal – third place	1997 Seville	4 × 200 m freestyle

Berit Raith Puggaard (born 11 December 1972) is a former freestyle and butterfly swimmer from Denmark, who represented her native country at the 1992 and 1996 Summer Olympics. She also won the bronze medal at the 1997 European Championships in the 4 × 200 m freestyle, alongside Ditte Jensen, Britt Raaby, and Mette Jacobsen.
