= Roberto Gleria =

Italian swimmer (born 1968)

Personal information
- Born: 15 October 1968 (age 57)

Sport
- Sport: Swimming
- Strokes: Freestyle
Medal record
Men's swimming
Representing Italy
World Championships (LC)
Bronze medal – third place	1991 Perth	4×200 m freestyle
European Championships (LC)
Gold medal – first place	1989 Bonn	4×200 m freestyle
Silver medal – second place	1991 Athens	4×200 m freestyle
Bronze medal – third place	1991 Athens	200 m freestyle
Mediterranean Games
Gold medal – first place	1991 Athens	4×200 m freestyle
Silver medal – second place	1991 Athens	4×100 m freestyle
Representing Australia
Commonwealth Games
Gold medal – first place	1986 Edinburgh	200 m freestyle
Gold medal – first place	1986 Edinburgh	4×200 m freestyle

Roberto Gleria (also Robert), born 15 October 1968, is a former freestyle swimmer from Italy.

Gleria swam for Australia in the mid-1980s and was an Australian Institute of Sport scholarship holder before taking up on an offer to swim for Italy leading up to the 1988 Seoul Olympic Games. He competed at the 1986 Commonwealth Games for Australia, winning gold medals in both the 200 metre freestyle and the 4×200 metre freestyle relay.

Gleria competed for Italy at the 1988 Summer Olympic Games in Seoul, South Korea, in both the 100, 200 and 400 metre freestyle, finishing first in the B Final of the 200 metre freestyle in a time of 1 minute 49.28 seconds. He also contributed to all three of Italy's relay teams.

He also competed at the 1992 Summer Olympic Games in Barcelona, Spain, in the 100 and 200 metre freestyles and both freestyle relays.

== See also ==
- List of Commonwealth Games medallists in swimming (men)
