= Gennadiy Prigoda =

Russian swimmer (born 1965)

Personal information
- Born: 2 May 1965 (age 61) Rostov-on-Don, Soviet Union
- Height: 1.80 m (5 ft 11 in)
- Weight: 75 kg (165 lb)

Sport
- Sport: Swimming
- Strokes: Freestyle
- Club: SKA Kuybyshev
Medal record
Men's swimming
Representing the Soviet Union
Olympic Games
Silver medal – second place	1988 Seoul	4×100 m freestyle
Bronze medal – third place	1988 Seoul	50 m freestyle
Bronze medal – third place	1988 Seoul	4×100 m medley
Representing the Unified Team
Silver medal – second place	1992 Barcelona	4×100 m freestyle
World Championships (LC)
Representing the Soviet Union
Silver medal – second place	1986 Madrid	4×100 m freestyle
Bronze medal – third place	1991 Perth	50 m freestyle
Bronze medal – third place	1991 Perth	4×100 m freestyle
European Championships
Representing the Soviet Union
Gold medal – first place	1987 Strasbourg	4×100 m medley
Gold medal – first place	1991 Athens	4×100 m freestyle
Silver medal – second place	1987 Strasbourg	50 m freestyle
Silver medal – second place	1991 Athens	50 m freestyle
Bronze medal – third place	1987 Strasbourg	4×100 m freestyle

Gennadiy Sergeyevich Prigoda (Russian: Геннадий Серге́евич Пригода; born 2 May 1965) is a former freestyle swimmer from Russia, who competed twice at the Summer Olympics first for the Soviet Union in 1988, and then for the Unified Team in 1992. The sprinter won four Olympic medals: two silver and two bronze. Prigoda trained at Armed Forces sports society in Kuibyshev.

He started swimming in a club aged 7, together with his elder brother, Alexandr Prigoda, who also became a top Russian swimmer. Between 1985 and 1991, he won three medals at the world championships, five medals at the European championships, and ten national titles in freestyle and medley relay events. Gennadi Touretski considers him as his most technically gifted trainee. Prigoda retired from active swimming in 1992. He graduated with a degree in pedagogy from the Lesgaft National State University of Physical Education in Saint Petersburg, and started his own business with a travel company. He later defended PhD in pedagogy and in 2005 returned to the Lesgaft University to work as a professor of management.
