= Luca Sacchi =

Italian swimmer (born 1968)

Personal information
- Full name: Luca Sacchi
- Nationality: Italian
- Born: 10 January 1968 (age 58) Milan, Italy
- Height: 1.85 m (6 ft 1 in)
- Weight: 78 kg (172 lb)

Sport
- Sport: Swimming
- Strokes: Medley
- Club: DDS Milano
- Coach: Walter Wucenovich, Remo Sacchi
Medal record
Representing Italy
Olympic Games
| Bronze medal – third place | 1992 Barcelona | 400 m indiv. medley |
European Championships (LC)
| Gold medal – first place | 1991 Athens | 400 m indiv. medley |
| Bronze medal – third place | 1991 Athens | 200 m indiv. medley |
| Bronze medal – third place | 1995 Vienna | 400 m indiv. medley |
Mediterranean Games
| Gold medal – first place | 1991 Athens | 400 m indiv. medley |
| Gold medal – first place | 1993 Narbonne | 200 m indiv. medley |
| Gold medal – first place | 1993 Narbonne | 400 m indiv. medley |

Luca Sacchi (born 10 January 1968) is a TV commentator and retired Italian swimmer. He competed at the 1988, 1992 and 1996 Olympics in the 200 m and 400 m individual medley and won a bronze medal in the 400 m in 1992. In 1991, he became European champion in the same event.

Sacchi's parents Remo and Bianca are also retired competitive swimmers, and his uncle Massimo and aunt Mara competed in swimming at the 1968 Olympics.

Sacchi currently works as a TV commentator for Italian state TV RAI.

Records
| Preceded by Incumbent | Men's 400 metre individual medley world record holder (short course); 28 February 1992 – 9 February 1993 | Succeeded by (Finland) Jani Sievinen |
