= Christian Poswiat =

German swimmer

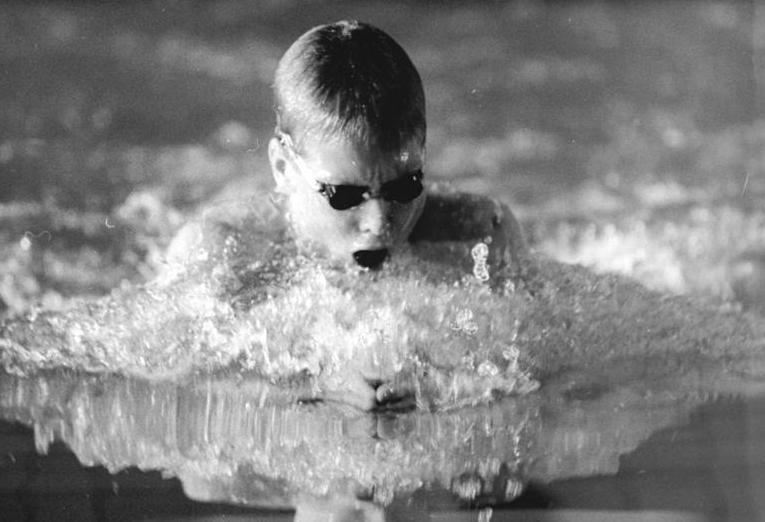
- Poswiat in 1988

Personal information
- Born: 26 June 1968 (age 58) East Berlin, East Germany
- Height: 1.91 m (6 ft 3 in)
- Weight: 79 kg (174 lb)

Sport
- Sport: Swimming
- Club: SC Dynamo Berlin
Medal record
Men's swimming
Representing Germany
World Championships
Bronze medal – third place	1991 Perth	4×100 m medley
Representing East Germany
European Championships
Bronze medal – third place	1987 Strasbourg	4×100 m medley

Christian Poswiat (born 26 June 1968) is a German swimmer who won two bronze medals in medley relays at the 1987 European Aquatics Championships and 1991 World Aquatics Championships. He also competed at the 1988 and 1992 Summer Olympics in the 100 m and 200 breaststroke; his best achievement was eighth place in the 100 m event in 1988.

After retirement, he continued competing in the masters category, and won several gold medals in medley and freestyle relays at the World Cups of 2010 and 2012. He works a swimming teacher for babies in Wuppertal. His sister Cordula was also a competitive swimmer in East Germany.
