= Peter Sitt =

German swimmer

Personal information
- Born: 7 December 1969 (age 56) Porz, Germany
- Height: 189 cm (6 ft 2 in)
- Weight: 76 kg (168 lb)

Sport
- Sport: Swimming
Medal record
Representing Germany
World Championships
Gold medal – first place	1991 Perth	4x200m freestyle relay
Silver medal – second place	1991 Perth	4x100m freestyle relay
Representing West Germany
Olympic Games
Bronze medal – third place	1988 Seoul	4×200 m freestyle
European Championships
Gold medal – first place	1987 Strasbourg	4x200m freestyle relay
Gold medal – first place	1989 Bonn	4x100m freestyle relay
Silver medal – second place	1987 Strasbourg	4x100m freestyle relay
Silver medal – second place	1989 Bonn	4x200m freestyle relay

Peter Sitt (born 7 December 1969) is a German former swimmer who competed in the 1988 Summer Olympics and in the 1992 Summer Olympics. Today he is working in the insurance industry.
