= Grit Müller =

German swimmer (born 1972)

Personal information
- Born: 6 June 1972 (age 54) Schwedt, East Germany
- Height: 1.75 m (5 ft 9 in)

Sport
- Sport: Swimming
- Club: ASK Vorwärts Potsdam
Medal record
Representing Germany
World Championships
Silver medal – second place	1991 Perth	800 m freestyle
Representing East Germany
European Championships
Bronze medal – third place	1989 Bonn	400 m medley

Grit Müller (born 6 June 1972) is a retired German swimmer who won a silver medal in the 800 m freestyle at the 1991 World Aquatics Championships and a bronze medal in the 400 m individual medley at the 1989 European Aquatics Championships. She also won six national titles in the 4×200 m relay (1988), 400 m freestyle (1991), 800 m freestyle (1990) and 400 m medley (1989–91).
