= Stephanie Ortwig =

German swimmer (born 1973)

Personal information
- Born: 28 January 1973 (age 53) Lennep, West Germany
- Height: 1.79 m (5 ft 10 in)
- Weight: 58 kg (128 lb)

Sport
- Sport: Swimming
- Club: SG Remscheid
Medal record
Representing Germany
World Championships
| Gold medal – first place | 1991 Perth | 4×200 m freestyle |

Stephanie Ortwig (born 28 January 1973) is a retired German swimmer who won a gold medal in the 4 × 200 m freestyle relay at the 1991 World Aquatics Championships. She also competed at the 1988 Summer Olympics and finished seventh in the 200 m, 400 m and 4 × 200 m freestyle events. Between 1988 and 1990 she won seven national titles in the 200–800 m freestyle disciplines. In 1988 she was selected as the German Junior Athlete of the Year.
