= Gianni Minervini (swimmer) =

Italian swimmer (born 1966)

Personal information
- Full name: Gianni Minervini
- Nationality: Italian
- Born: 21 October 1966 (age 59) Rome, Italy
- Height: 1.92 m (6 ft 4 in)
- Weight: 85 kg (187 lb)

Sport
- Sport: Swimming
- Strokes: Breaststroke
Medal record
European Championships
Bronze medal – third place	1987 Strasbourg	100 m breaststroke
Bronze medal – third place	1989 Bonn	4×100 m medley
Bronze medal – third place	1991 Athens	100 m breaststroke
Mediterranean Games
Gold medal – first place	1987 Latakia	100 m breaststroke
Gold medal – first place	1987 Latakia	4x100 m medley
Bronze medal – third place	1991 Athens	100 m breaststroke
Summer Universiade
Silver medal – second place	1985 Kobe	100 m breaststroke

Gianni Minervini (born 21 October 1966) is an Italian former swimmer who competed in the 1984 Summer Olympics, in the 1988 Summer Olympics, and in the 1992 Summer Olympics.
