= Stefano Battistelli =

Italian swimmer (born 1970)

Personal information
- Full name: Stefano Battistelli
- Nickname: "Bibi"
- Nationality: Italian
- Born: 6 March 1970 (age 56) Rome
- Height: 1.76 m (5 ft 9 in)

Sport
- Sport: Swimming
- Strokes: Backstroke and Medley
Medal record
Olympic Games
Bronze medal – third place	1988 Seoul	400 m medley
Bronze medal – third place	1992 Barcelona	200 m backstroke
World Championships (LC)
Silver medal – second place	1986 Madrid	1500 m freestyle
Silver medal – second place	1991 Perth	200 m backstroke
Bronze medal – third place	1991 Perth	400 m medley
Bronze medal – third place	1991 Perth	4×200 m freestyle
European Championships (LC)
Gold medal – first place	1989 Bonn	200 m backstroke
Gold medal – first place	1989 Bonn	4×200 m freestyle
Silver medal – second place	1991 Athens	4×200 m freestyle
Bronze medal – third place	1989 Bonn	400 m medley
Bronze medal – third place	1989 Bonn	4×100 m medley
Summer Universiade
Bronze medal – third place	1997 Catania	400 m medley
Mediterranean Games
Gold medal – first place	1987 Latakia	100 m backstroke
Gold medal – first place	1987 Latakia	200 m backstroke
Gold medal – first place	1987 Latakia	400 m medley

Stefano ("Bibi") Battistelli (born 6 March 1970 in Rome) is a former backstroke and medley swimmer from Italy.

== Biography ==
He competed in two consecutive Summer Olympics (1988 and 1992), and won a bronze medal at each appearance. The bronze in Seoul was the first Olympic medal for a male Italian swimmer.

== See also ==
- Italy national swimming team - Multiple medalists
