= Christian Gessner =

German swimmer

Personal information
- Born: 16 June 1968 (age 58) Gera, East Germany
- Height: 1.92 m (6 ft 4 in)
- Weight: 84 kg (185 lb)

Sport
- Sport: Swimming
- Club: TSV Erfurt, Erfurt
Medal record
Men's swimming
Representing Germany
World Championships
| Bronze medal – third place | 1991 Perth | 200 m medley |
European Championships
| Silver medal – second place | 1991 Athens | 200 m medley |
| Bronze medal – third place | 1991 Athens | 400 m medley |

Christian Gessner (or Geßner; born 16 June 1968) is a retired German swimmer who won three medals in the 200 m and 400 m medley at the 1991 European Aquatics Championships and 1991 World Aquatics Championships. Next year, he finished fifth in the same events at the 1992 Summer Olympics.
