= Nils Rudolph =

German swimmer

Personal information
- Born: 18 August 1965 (age 60) Rostock, East Germany
Medal record
Men's swimming
Representing Germany
European Championships (LC)
Gold medal – first place	1991 Athens	50 m freestyle
Silver medal – second place	1991 Athens	100 m freestyle
Silver medal – second place	1991 Athens	4×100 m freestyle
Bronze medal – third place	1989 Bonn	50 m freestyle
Bronze medal – third place	1991 Athens	100 m butterfly
European Championships (SC)
Silver medal – second place	1991 Gelsenkirchen	50 m butterfly

Nils Rudolph (born 18 August 1965 in Rostock, Mecklenburg-Vorpommern) is a former butterfly and freestyle swimmer from Germany, who competed for his native country at the 1992 Summer Olympics in Barcelona, Spain. He is best known for winning the gold medal in the men's 50 m freestyle at the 1991 European LC Championships in Athens, Greece.
