= Stefan Pfeiffer =

German swimmer

Personal information
- Nationality: German
- Born: 15 November 1965 (age 60) Hamburg, West Germany
- Height: 1.90 m (6 ft 3 in)
- Weight: 80 kg (176 lb)

Sport
- Sport: Swimming
- Strokes: Freestyle
Medal record
Men's swimming
Olympic Games
Representing West Germany
Silver medal – second place	1988 Seoul	1500 m freestyle
Bronze medal – third place	1984 Los Angeles	1500 m freestyle
Bronze medal – third place	1988 Seoul	4×200 m freestyle
World Championships
Representing Germany
Gold medal – first place	1991 Perth	4×200 m freestyle
Silver medal – second place	1991 Perth	400 m freestyle
Bronze medal – third place	1991 Perth	1500 m freestyle
European Championships (LC)
Representing West Germany
Silver medal – second place	1989 Bonn	400 m freestyle
Silver medal – second place	1989 Bonn	1500 m freestyle
Silver medal – second place	1989 Bonn	4×200 m freestyle
Bronze medal – third place	1983 Rome	1500 m freestyle
Bronze medal – third place	1985 Sofia	1500 m freestyle
Bronze medal – third place	1987 Strasbourg	1500 m freestyle

Stefan Pfeiffer (born 15 November 1965 in Hamburg) is a former freestyle swimmer from Germany. At the 1984 Summer Olympics in Los Angeles he won the bronze medal in the 1500 m freestyle event. Four years later at the 1988 Summer Olympics in Seoul, Pfeiffer earned another medal, this time silver, in the same event.
