= Catherine Plewinski =

French swimmer

Personal information
- Born: 12 July 1968 (age 57) Courrières, Pas-de-Calais
Medal record
Women's swimming
Representing France
Olympic Games
Bronze medal – third place	1988 Seoul	100 m freestyle
Bronze medal – third place	1992 Barcelona	100 m butterfly
World Championships (LC)
Silver medal – second place	1991 Perth	50 m freestyle
Silver medal – second place	1991 Perth	100 m freestyle
Bronze medal – third place	1991 Perth	100 m butterfly
European Championships (LC)
Gold medal – first place	1989 Bonn	50 m freestyle
Gold medal – first place	1989 Bonn	100 m butterfly
Gold medal – first place	1991 Athens	100 m freestyle
Gold medal – first place	1991 Athens	100 m butterfly
Gold medal – first place	1993 Sheffield	100 m butterfly
Silver medal – second place	1991 Athens	50 m freestyle
Silver medal – second place	1991 Athens	200 m freestyle
Bronze medal – third place	1987 Strasbourg	100 m butterfly
Bronze medal – third place	1993 Sheffield	100 m freestyle
Mediterranean Games
Gold medal – first place	1993 Narbonne	100 m freestyle
Gold medal – first place	1993 Narbonne	100 m butterfly

Catherine Plewinski (born 12 July 1968 in Courrières, Pas-de-Calais) is a former freestyle and butterfly swimmer from France, who won two bronze medals at the Summer Olympics. She first did so in Seoul at the 1988 Summer Olympics in the 100 m freestyle. Four years later she captured the bronze in the 100 m butterfly at the 1992 Summer Olympics in Barcelona, Spain.

At the 1989 European Aquatics Championships she was the only female swimmer not from East Germany to win gold medals, she won the 50 meter freestyle and the 100 meter butterfly.

== See also ==
- List of Olympic medalists in swimming (women)
- List of World Aquatics Championships medalists in swimming (women)
