= Yelena Volkova (swimmer) =

Soviet swimmer

Personal information
- Full name: Yelena Yuryevna Volkova
- Nationality: Soviet
- Born: May 27, 1968 (age 58)
- Height: 180 cm (5 ft 11 in)
- Weight: 71 kg (157 lb)

Sport
- Sport: Swimming
- Strokes: Breaststroke
Medal record
Women's swimming
Representing Soviet Union
World Championships (LC)
| Gold medal – first place | 1991 Perth | 200 m breaststroke |
| Bronze medal – third place | 1991 Perth | 100 m breaststroke |
European Championships (LC)
| Bronze medal – third place | 1989 Bonn | 200 m breaststroke |

Yelena Volkova (Елена Юрьевна Волкова), born 27 May 1968, is a former swimmer from the Soviet Union who won the gold medal in the 200 meters breaststroke at the 1991 World Aquatics Championships in Perth, Australia. She represented the Soviet Union at the 1988 Olympics where she finished 5th in the 100 meters breaststroke, and the Unified Team at the 1992 Olympics.

== Personal life ==
Volkova's husband Gennadiy Prigoda was also an Olympic swimmer. Elena Volkova and Gennadiy Prigoda has a son named Kirill Prigoda, who competed in the men's 100 metre breaststroke event at the 2016 Summer Olympics.
