= Karin Brienesse =

Dutch swimmer (born 1969)

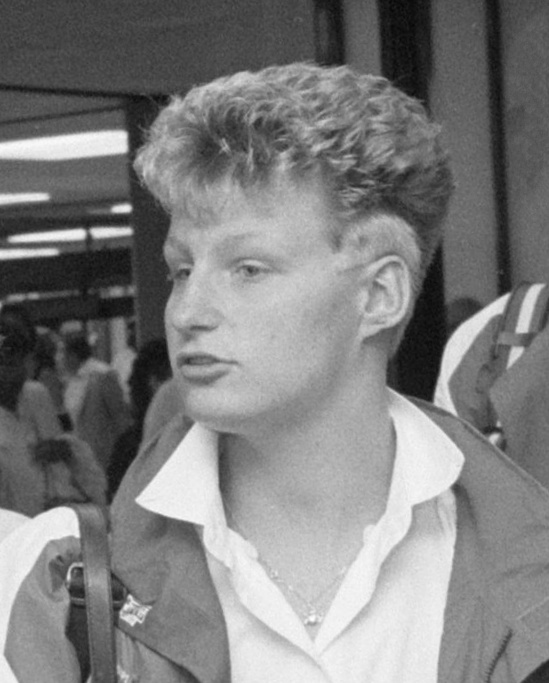
- Karin Brienesse in 1988

Personal information
- Born: 17 July 1969 (age 56)
Medal record
Women's swimming
Representing the Netherlands
Olympic Games
| Silver medal – second place | 1988 Seoul | 4×100 m freestyle |
World Championships (LC)
| Silver medal – second place | 1991 Perth | 4×200 m freestyle |
| Bronze medal – third place | 1986 Madrid | 4×100 m freestyle |
| Bronze medal – third place | 1991 Perth | 4×100 m freestyle |
European Championships (LC)
| Gold medal – first place | 1991 Athens | 4×100 m freestyle |
| Silver medal – second place | 1987 Strasbourg | 4×100 m freestyle |
| Silver medal – second place | 1991 Athens | 100 m freestyle |
| Bronze medal – third place | 1985 Sofia | 4×100 m freestyle |
| Bronze medal – third place | 1991 Athens | 4×200 m freestyle |
| Bronze medal – third place | 1991 Athens | 4×100 m medley |

Karin Brienesse (born 17 July 1969 in Breda) is a former freestyle and butterfly swimmer from the Netherlands, who competed in three consequentive Summer Olympics for her native country, starting in 1988. There she won the silver medal with the Dutch 4×100 m freestyle relay team, behind East Germany. Three years later Brienesse won the title in the same event at the European LC Championships 1991 in Athens, Greece.
