= Susanne Müller (swimmer) =

German swimmer

Sport
- Sport: Swimming
- Club: SC Turbine Erfurt
Medal record
Representing Germany
World Championships (LC)
Bronze medal – third place	1991 Perth	4×100 m medley
European Championships (SC)
Bronze medal – third place	1992 Espoo	50 m butterfly

Susanne Müller is a retired German swimmer who won bronze medals in the 4 × 100 m medley relay at the 1991 World Aquatics Championships and in the 50 m butterfly event at the European Sprint Swimming Championships 1992.
