= Nicole Haislett =

American swimmer (born 1972)

Personal information
- Full name: Nicole Lee Haislett
- National team: United States
- Born: December 16, 1972 (age 53) St. Petersburg, Florida, U.S.
- Height: 5 ft 8 in (1.73 m)
- Weight: 140 lb (64 kg)

Sport
- Sport: Swimming
- Strokes: Freestyle, individual medley
- Club: St. Pete Aquatics Club
- College team: University of Florida
Medal record
Women's swimming
Representing United States
Olympic Games
Gold medal – first place	1992 Barcelona	200 m freestyle
Gold medal – first place	1992 Barcelona	4×100 m freestyle
Gold medal – first place	1992 Barcelona	4×100 m medley
World Championships (LC)
Gold medal – first place	1991 Perth	100 m freestyle
Gold medal – first place	1991 Perth	4×100 m freestyle
Gold medal – first place	1991 Perth	4×100 m medley
Silver medal – second place	1994 Rome	4×100 m freestyle
Bronze medal – third place	1994 Rome	4×200 m freestyle
Pan Pacific Championships
Gold medal – first place	1989 Tokyo	4×100 m freestyle
Gold medal – first place	1991 Edmonton	200 m freestyle
Gold medal – first place	1991 Edmonton	4×100 m freestyle
Gold medal – first place	1991 Edmonton	4×200 m freestyle
Gold medal – first place	1991 Edmonton	4×100 m medley
Gold medal – first place	1993 Kobe	4×100 m freestyle
Gold medal – first place	1993 Kobe	4×200 m freestyle
Silver medal – second place	1991 Edmonton	100 m freestyle
Silver medal – second place	1991 Edmonton	200 m medley
Silver medal – second place	1993 Kobe	200 m freestyle
Bronze medal – third place	1989 Tokyo	100 m freestyle
Goodwill Games
Gold medal – first place	1990 Seattle	100 m freestyle
Silver medal – second place	1990 Seattle	200 m freestyle
Bronze medal – third place	1994 St Petersburg	100 m freestyle

Nicole Lee Haislett (born December 16, 1972) is an American former competitive swimmer who was a three-time Olympic gold medalist, a former world and American record-holder, and an eight-time American national college champion. During her international swimming career, Haislett won twenty-two medals in major international championships, including fourteen golds.

== Early years ==
Haislett was born in St. Petersburg, Florida in 1972. She was a "water baby"—she learned to swim at 18 months old. At the time, her parents merely wanted her to be comfortable in water, not intending that swimming would become her life focus. She began to train with the St. Pete Aquatics Club at the age of 6. Haislett attended Lakewood High School in St. Petersburg, where she swam for the Lakewood Spartans high school swim team, winning four Florida high school state championships in two years. As a 16-year-old high school junior, she won the 50-, 100- and 200-meter events at the U.S. Open Swimming Championships in 1989. At the 1990 U.S. Short Course Swimming National Championships, she won the national title in the 200-yard freestyle.

== College swimming career ==
After graduating from high school, Haislett accepted an athletic scholarship to attend the University of Florida in Gainesville, Florida, where she swam for coach Mitch Ivey and coach Chris Martin's Florida Gators swimming and diving team in National Collegiate Athletic Association (NCAA) competition from 1991 to 1994. As a Gator swimmer, she won NCAA national titles in the 200-yard freestyle for four consecutive years from 1991 to 1994, the 200-yard individual medley in 1993, and the 500-yard freestyle in 1994, and was a member of the Gators' NCAA-winning relay teams in the 4×100-yard freestyle in 1993 and the 4×100-yard medley relay in 1994. She received twenty-eight All-American honors in four years—the maximum number possible. In four years of swimming, she was undefeated in Southeastern Conference (SEC) competition, and was recognized as the SEC Female Swimmer of the Year for four consecutive years from 1991 to 1994, and the SEC Female Athlete of the Year (all sports) in 1993 and 1994. She was the 1993–94 recipient of the Honda Sports Award for Swimming and Diving, recognizing her as the outstanding college female swimmer of the year.

== International swimming career ==
Haislett was the first American woman to defeat a swimmer from East Germany in the 100-meter freestyle since the 1972 Summer Olympics; she did so at the 1990 Goodwill Games in Seattle, Washington. At the 1991 World Aquatics Championships in Perth, Western Australia, Haislett won the 100-meter freestyle, and swam the anchor legs for the winning U.S. teams in the 4×100-meter freestyle and the 4×100-meter medley relays, ending the East German women's eighteen years of overwhelming dominance in the 100-meter freestyle at the world championships. Haislett also endured the emotional agony of disqualifying her team on an early exchange in the 4×200-meter freestyle relay – a relay race that the American women won in the water.

Haislett qualified for four events at the 1992 Summer Olympics in Barcelona, Spain. After finishing a disappointing fourth in the women's 100-meter freestyle, Haislett won the 200-meter freestyle event with a time of 1:57.90 for her first Olympic gold medal. Drafting off German swimmer Franziska Van Almsick, she swam what was described as a "perfect race." She was a member of the winning U.S. team in the 4×100-meter freestyle relay, together with Jenny Thompson, Dara Torres and Angel Martino, which set a new world record of 3:39.46 in the event final while winning the gold medal. Haislett swam the freestyle leg in the preliminaries of the 4×100-meter medley relay to earn her third Olympic gold medal.

Haislett was the first American woman to swim the 200-meter freestyle in under one minute, fifty-eight seconds (1:58), and held the American record until 2003, when it was broken by Lindsay Benko. After six months in residence at the U.S. Olympic Training Center in Colorado Springs, she announced her retirement from competition swimming in 1995, citing her prior success and waning motivation and competitive desire.

== Life after competition swimming ==
Haislett graduated from the University of Florida with a bachelor's degree in telecommunications in 1996, and served as an assistant coach for the Florida Gators women's swim team under head coach Kevin Thornton from 1996 to 1997. Afterward, she studied to be a chef at the Florida Culinary Institute in West Palm Beach, Florida, and subsequently worked as the dining room manager and activities director at an assisted living community for seniors. She was inducted into the University of Florida Athletic Hall of Fame as a "Gator Great" in 2004, and the Florida Sports Hall of Fame in 2005. Haislett and her ex-husband have a daughter, Blake, who was born in 2006.

== World record ==
Women's 4×100-meter freestyle relay

Time	Date	Event	Location
3:39.46	July 28, 1992	1992 Summer Olympics	Barcelona, Spain

Note: Record time and location are sourced to USA Swimming's list of world records.

== See also ==
- List of multiple Olympic gold medalists
- List of Olympic medalists in swimming (women)
- List of United States records in swimming
- List of University of Florida alumni
- List of University of Florida Athletic Hall of Fame members
- List of University of Florida Olympians
- List of World Aquatics Championships medalists in swimming (women)
- World record progression 4 × 100 metres freestyle relay
