= Gitta Jensen =

Danish swimmer (born 1972)

Personal information
- Born: 18 July 1972 (age 54) Esbjerg, Denmark
- Height: 1.83 m (6 ft 0 in)
- Weight: 68 kg (150 lb)

Sport
- Sport: Swimming
- Club: Sædding-Guldager IF, Esbjerg; Hjerting IF, Esbjerg
Medal record
Women's swimming
Representing Denmark
World Championships
Bronze medal – third place	1991 Perth	4×200 m freestyle
European Championships
Gold medal – first place	1991 Athens	4×200 m freestyle
Bronze medal – third place	1991 Athens	4×100 m freestyle

Gitta Poulsgaard Jensen (born 18 July 1972) is a Danish retired swimmer who won three relay medals at the World and European championships in 1991. She also competed at the 1988 and 1992 Summer Olympics in nine events; her best achievement was sixth place in the 4 × 100 m freestyle relay in 1992.
