= Dagmar Hase =

German swimmer (born 1969)

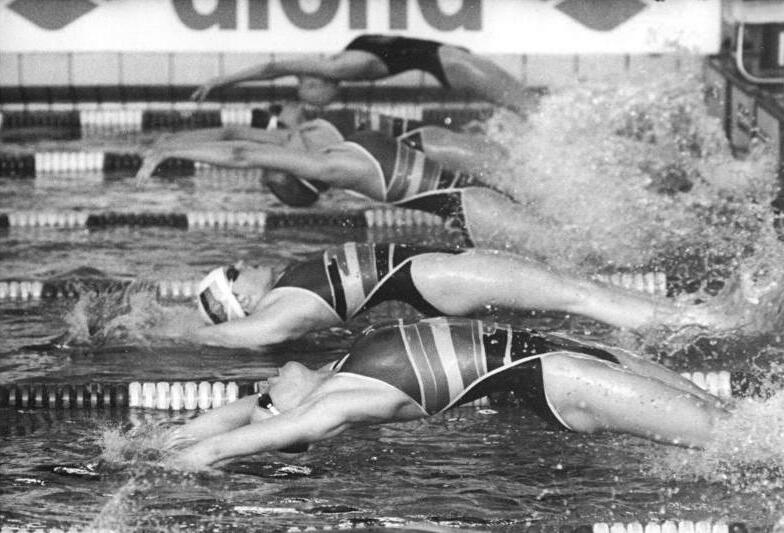
- Hase (front)

Personal information
- Full name: Dagmar Hase
- Nationality: Germany
- Born: 22 December 1969 (age 56) Quedlinburg, Saxony-Anhalt, East Germany
- Height: 1.83 m (6 ft 0 in)
- Weight: 62 kg (137 lb)

Sport
- Sport: Swimming
- Strokes: Freestyle, backstroke
- Club: Sportclub Magdeburg
Medal record
Women's swimming
Representing Germany
Olympic Games
Gold medal – first place	1992 Barcelona	400 m freestyle
Silver medal – second place	1992 Barcelona	200 m backstroke
Silver medal – second place	1992 Barcelona	4 × 100 m medley
Silver medal – second place	1996 Atlanta	400 m freestyle
Silver medal – second place	1996 Atlanta	800 m freestyle
Silver medal – second place	1996 Atlanta	4 × 200 m freestyle
Bronze medal – third place	1996 Atlanta	200 m freestyle
World Championships (LC)
Gold medal – first place	1991 Perth	4 × 200 m freestyle
Gold medal – first place	1998 Perth	4 × 200 m freestyle
Silver medal – second place	1991 Perth	200 m backstroke
Silver medal – second place	1994 Rome	4 × 200 m freestyle
Silver medal – second place	1998 Perth	200 m backstroke
Bronze medal – third place	1998 Perth	400 m freestyle
World Championships (SC)
Silver medal – second place	1995 Rio de Janeiro	200 m backstroke
Silver medal – second place	1995 Rio de Janeiro	4 × 200 m freestyle
European Championships (LC)
Representing East Germany
Gold medal – first place	1989 Bonn	200 m backstroke
Representing Germany
Gold medal – first place	1993 Sheffield	400 m freestyle
Gold medal – first place	1993 Sheffield	4 × 200 m freestyle
Gold medal – first place	1995 Vienna	4 × 200 m freestyle
Gold medal – first place	1997 Seville	400 m freestyle
Gold medal – first place	1997 Seville	4 × 200 m freestyle
Silver medal – second place	1991 Athens	4 × 100 m freestyle
Silver medal – second place	1991 Athens	4 × 200 m freestyle
Silver medal – second place	1991 Athens	4 × 100 m medley
Silver medal – second place	1995 Vienna	200 m backstroke
Bronze medal – third place	1991 Athens	100 m backstroke
Bronze medal – third place	1991 Athens	200 m backstroke

Dagmar Hase (born 22 December 1969) is a retired German swimmer. She was an Olympic champion, World champion and a European champion.

== Career ==
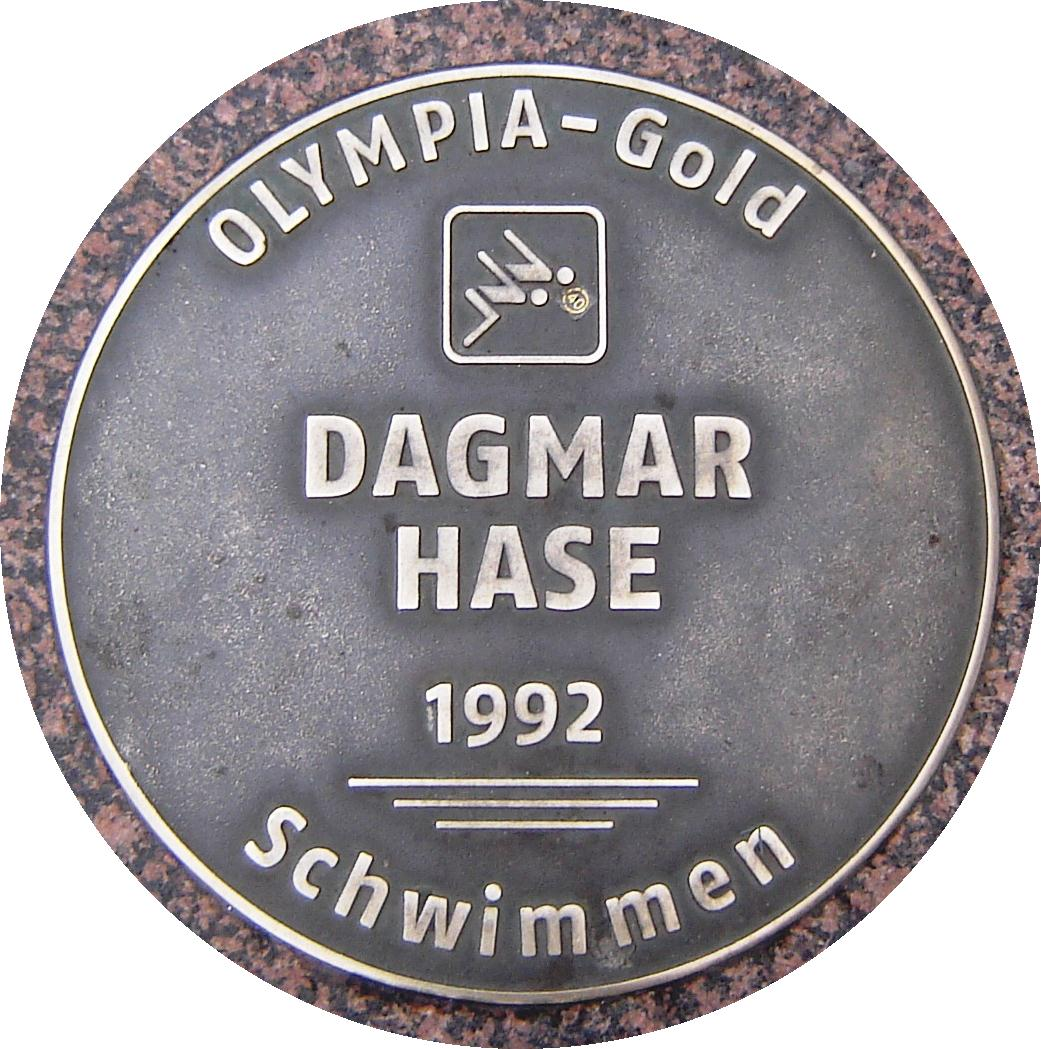
Olympic gold medal (1992)

Hase specialised in the freestyle and backstroke. She won seven Olympic medals in her career, including a gold medal in the 400 m freestyle at the 1992 Summer Olympics. Her defeat of American swimmer Janet Evans in the 400 metre freestyle at the 1992 Barcelona Olympics was Evans's only loss in a 400 or 800 metre freestyle between 1986 and 1994.

She also defeated the highly decorated, record-breaking Olympic gold medalist Krisztina Egerszegi in the 200 metre backstroke at the 1989 European Aquatics Championships. Notably, Egerszegi had won gold in the event at the 1988 Summer Olympics in Seoul, and this would be her only loss in the 200 m backstroke until 1994. Hase received Olympic and World Championship medals across the 200 freestyle, 400 freestyle, 800 freestyle, and 200 backstroke events.

At the World Championships in 1994 she qualified for the 200 metre freestyle as the eighth best swimmer, but her teammate Franziska van Almsick swam only the ninth best qualification time. Hase abandoned her start place and offered it to van Almsick, who then won the gold medal in the final, bettering the world record.

== See also ==
- List of German records in swimming
