= List of World Aquatics Championships medalists in swimming (men) =

This is the complete list of men's World Aquatics Championships medalists in swimming from 1973 to 2025.

== Medalists ==
Bold numbers in brackets denotes record number of victories in corresponding disciplines.

=== 50 metre freestyle ===
Year	Gold	Silver	Bronze
1986 Madrid	Tom Jager; United States	Dano Halsall; Switzerland	Matt Biondi; United States
1991 Perth	Tom Jager; United States	Matt Biondi; United States	Gennadiy Prigoda; Soviet Union
1994 Rome	Alexander Popov; Russia	Gary Hall, Jr. United States	Raimundas Mažuolis; Lithuania
1998 Perth	Bill Pilczuk; United States	Alexander Popov; Russia	Ricardo Busquets; Puerto Rico
1998 Perth	Bill Pilczuk; United States	Alexander Popov; Russia	Michael Klim; Australia
2001 Fukuoka	Anthony Ervin; United States	Pieter van den Hoogenband; Netherlands	Roland Schoeman; South Africa
2001 Fukuoka	Anthony Ervin; United States	Pieter van den Hoogenband; Netherlands	Tomohiro Yamanoi; Japan
2003 Barcelona	Alexander Popov; Russia	Mark Foster; Great Britain	Pieter van den Hoogenband; Netherlands
2005 Montreal	Roland Schoeman; South Africa	Duje Draganja; Croatia	Bartosz Kizierowski; Poland
2007 Melbourne	Ben Wildman-Tobriner; United States	Cullen Jones; United States	Stefan Nystrand; Sweden
2009 Rome	César Cielo; Brazil	Frédérick Bousquet; France	Amaury Leveaux; France
2011 Shanghai	César Cielo; Brazil	Luca Dotto; Italy	Alain Bernard; France
2013 Barcelona	César Cielo (3); Brazil	Vladimir Morozov; Russia	George Bovell; Trinidad and Tobago
2015 Kazan	Florent Manaudou; France	Nathan Adrian; United States	Bruno Fratus; Brazil
2017 Budapest	Caeleb Dressel; United States	Bruno Fratus; Brazil	Ben Proud; Great Britain
2019 Gwangju	Caeleb Dressel; United States	Bruno Fratus; Brazil	none awarded
2019 Gwangju	Caeleb Dressel; United States	Kristian Golomeev; Greece	none awarded
2022 Budapest	Ben Proud; Great Britain	Michael Andrew; United States	Maxime Grousset; France
2023 Fukuoka	Cameron McEvoy; Australia	Jack Alexy; United States	Ben Proud; Great Britain
2024 Doha	Vladyslav Bukhov; Ukraine	Cameron McEvoy; Australia	Ben Proud; Great Britain
2025 Singapore	Cameron McEvoy; Australia	Ben Proud; Great Britain	Jack Alexy; United States

Medal table

Rank	Nation	Gold	Silver	Bronze	Total
1	United States	7	6	2	15
2	Brazil	3	2	1	6
3	Russia	2	2	0	4
4	Australia	2	1	1	4
5	Great Britain	1	2	3	6
6	France	1	1	3	5
7	South Africa	1	0	1	2
8	Ukraine	1	0	0	1
9	Netherlands	0	1	1	2
10	Croatia	0	1	0	1
10	Greece	0	1	0	1
10	Italy	0	1	0	1
10	Switzerland	0	1	0	1
14	Japan	0	0	1	1
14	Lithuania	0	0	1	1
14	Poland	0	0	1	1
14	Puerto Rico	0	0	1	1
14	Soviet Union	0	0	1	1
14	Sweden	0	0	1	1
14	Trinidad and Tobago	0	0	1	1
Totals (20 entries)		18	19	19	56

=== 100 metre freestyle ===
Year	Gold	Silver	Bronze
1973 Belgrade	Jim Montgomery; United States	Michel Rousseau; France	Michael Wenden; Australia
1975 Cali	Andy Coan; United States	Vladimir Bure; Soviet Union	Jim Montgomery; United States
1978 West Berlin	David McCagg; United States	Jim Montgomery; United States	Klaus Steinbach; West Germany
1982 Guayaquil	Jörg Woithe; East Germany	Rowdy Gaines; United States	Per Johansson; Sweden
1986 Madrid	Matt Biondi; United States	Stéphan Caron; France	Tom Jager; United States
1991 Perth	Matt Biondi; United States	Tommy Werner; Sweden	Giorgio Lamberti; Italy
1994 Rome	Alexander Popov; Russia	Gary Hall, Jr. United States	Gustavo Borges; Brazil
1998 Perth	Alexander Popov; Russia	Michael Klim; Australia	Lars Frölander; Sweden
2001 Fukuoka	Anthony Ervin; United States	Pieter van den Hoogenband; Netherlands	Lars Frölander; Sweden
2003 Barcelona	Alexander Popov (3); Russia	Pieter van den Hoogenband; Netherlands	Ian Thorpe; Australia
2005 Montreal	Filippo Magnini; Italy	Roland Schoeman; South Africa	Ryk Neethling; South Africa
2007 Melbourne	Brent Hayden; Canada	none awarded	Eamon Sullivan; Australia
2007 Melbourne	Filippo Magnini; Italy	none awarded	Eamon Sullivan; Australia
2009 Rome	César Cielo; Brazil	Alain Bernard; France	Frédérick Bousquet; France
2011 Shanghai	James Magnussen; Australia	Brent Hayden; Canada	William Meynard; France
2013 Barcelona	James Magnussen; Australia	Jimmy Feigen; United States	Nathan Adrian; United States
2015 Kazan	Ning Zetao; China	Cameron McEvoy; Australia	Federico Grabich; Argentina
2017 Budapest	Caeleb Dressel; United States	Nathan Adrian; United States	Mehdy Metella; France
2019 Gwangju	Caeleb Dressel; United States	Kyle Chalmers; Australia	Vladislav Grinev; Russia
2022 Budapest	David Popovici; Romania	Maxime Grousset; France	Joshua Liendo; Canada
2023 Fukuoka	Kyle Chalmers; Australia	Jack Alexy; United States	Maxime Grousset; France
2024 Doha	Pan Zhanle; China	Alessandro Miressi; Italy	Nándor Németh; Hungary
2025 Singapore	David Popovici; Romania	Jack Alexy; United States	Kyle Chalmers; Australia

Medal table

Rank	Nation	Gold	Silver	Bronze	Total
1	United States	8	7	3	18
2	Australia	3	3	4	10
3	Russia	3	0	1	4
4	Italy	2	1	1	4
5	China	2	0	0	2
5	Romania	2	0	0	2
7	Canada	1	1	1	3
8	Brazil	1	0	1	2
9	East Germany	1	0	0	1
10	France	0	4	4	8
11	Netherlands	0	2	0	2
12	Sweden	0	1	3	4
13	South Africa	0	1	1	2
14	Soviet Union	0	1	0	1
15	Argentina	0	0	1	1
15	Hungary	0	0	1	1
15	West Germany	0	0	1	1
Totals (17 entries)		23	21	22	66

=== 200 metre freestyle ===
Year	Gold	Silver	Bronze
1973 Belgrade	Jim Montgomery; United States	Kurt Krumpholz; United States	Roger Pyttel; East Germany
1975 Cali	Timothy Shaw; United States	Bruce Furniss; United States	Brian Brinkley; Great Britain
1978 West Berlin	Bill Forrester; United States	Rowdy Gaines; United States	Sergey Koplyakov; Soviet Union
1982 Guayaquil	Michael Gross; West Germany	Rowdy Gaines; United States	Jörg Woithe; East Germany
1986 Madrid	Michael Gross (2); West Germany	Sven Lodziewski; East Germany	Matt Biondi; United States
1991 Perth	Giorgio Lamberti; Italy	Steffen Zesner; Germany	Artur Wojdat; Poland
1994 Rome	Antti Kasvio; Finland	Anders Holmertz; Sweden	Danyon Loader; New Zealand
1998 Perth	Michael Klim; Australia	Massimiliano Rosolino; Italy	Pieter van den Hoogenband; Netherlands
2001 Fukuoka	Ian Thorpe; Australia	Pieter van den Hoogenband; Netherlands	Klete Keller; United States
2003 Barcelona	Ian Thorpe (2); Australia	Pieter van den Hoogenband; Netherlands	Grant Hackett; Australia
2005 Montreal	Michael Phelps; United States	Grant Hackett; Australia	Ryk Neethling; South Africa
2007 Melbourne	Michael Phelps (2); United States	Pieter van den Hoogenband; Netherlands	Park Tae-hwan; South Korea
2009 Rome	Paul Biedermann; Germany	Michael Phelps; United States	Danila Izotov; Russia
2011 Shanghai	Ryan Lochte; United States	Michael Phelps; United States	Paul Biedermann; Germany
2013 Barcelona	Yannick Agnel; France	Conor Dwyer; United States	Danila Izotov; Russia
2015 Kazan	James Guy; Great Britain	Sun Yang; China	Paul Biedermann; Germany
2017 Budapest	Sun Yang; China	Townley Haas; United States	Aleksandr Krasnykh; Russia
2019 Gwangju	Sun Yang (2); China	Katsuhiro Matsumoto; Japan	Martin Malyutin; Russia
2019 Gwangju	Sun Yang (2); China	Katsuhiro Matsumoto; Japan	Duncan Scott; Great Britain
2022 Budapest	David Popovici; Romania	Hwang Sun-woo; South Korea	Tom Dean; Great Britain
2023 Fukuoka	Matthew Richards; Great Britain	Tom Dean; Great Britain	Hwang Sun-woo; South Korea
2024 Doha	Hwang Sun-woo; South Korea	Danas Rapšys; Lithuania	Luke Hobson; United States
2025 Singapore	David Popovici (2); Romania	Luke Hobson; United States	Tatsuya Murasa; Japan

Medal table

Rank	Nation	Gold	Silver	Bronze	Total
1	United States	6	9	3	18
2	Australia	3	1	1	5
3	Great Britain	2	1	3	6
4	China	2	1	0	3
5	Romania	2	0	0	2
5	West Germany	2	0	0	2
7	Germany	1	1	2	4
7	South Korea	1	1	2	4
9	Italy	1	1	0	2
10	Finland	1	0	0	1
10	France	1	0	0	1
12	Netherlands	0	3	1	4
13	East Germany	0	1	2	3
14	Japan	0	1	1	2
15	Lithuania	0	1	0	1
15	Sweden	0	1	0	1
17	Russia	0	0	4	4
18	New Zealand	0	0	1	1
18	Poland	0	0	1	1
18	South Africa	0	0	1	1
18	Soviet Union	0	0	1	1
Totals (21 entries)		22	22	23	67

=== 400 metre freestyle ===
Year	Gold	Silver	Bronze
1973 Belgrade	Rick DeMont; United States	Brad Cooper; Australia	Bengt Gingsjö; Sweden
1975 Cali	Timothy Shaw; United States	Bruce Furniss; United States	Frank Pfütze; East Germany
1978 West Berlin	Vladimir Salnikov; Soviet Union	Jeff Float; United States	Bill Forrester; United States
1982 Guayaquil	Vladimir Salnikov; Soviet Union	Svyatoslav Semenov; Soviet Union	Sven Lodziewski; East Germany
1986 Madrid	Rainer Henkel; West Germany	Uwe Daßler; East Germany	Dan Jorgensen; United States
1991 Perth	Jörg Hoffmann; Germany	Stefan Pfeiffer; Germany	Artur Wojdat; Poland
1994 Rome	Kieren Perkins; Australia	Antti Kasvio; Finland	Danyon Loader; New Zealand
1998 Perth	Ian Thorpe; Australia	Grant Hackett; Australia	Paul Palmer; Great Britain
2001 Fukuoka	Ian Thorpe; Australia	Grant Hackett; Australia	Emiliano Brembilla; Italy
2003 Barcelona	Ian Thorpe; Australia	Grant Hackett; Australia	Dragoş Coman; Romania
2005 Montreal	Grant Hackett; Australia	Yury Prilukov; Russia	Oussama Mellouli; Tunisia
2007 Melbourne	Park Tae-hwan; South Korea	Grant Hackett; Australia	Yury Prilukov; Russia
2009 Rome	Paul Biedermann; Germany	Oussama Mellouli; Tunisia	Zhang Lin; China
2011 Shanghai	Park Tae-hwan; South Korea	Sun Yang; China	Paul Biedermann; Germany
2013 Barcelona	Sun Yang; China	Kosuke Hagino; Japan	Connor Jaeger; United States
2015 Kazan	Sun Yang; China	James Guy; Great Britain	Ryan Cochrane; Canada
2017 Budapest	Sun Yang; China	Mack Horton; Australia	Gabriele Detti; Italy
2019 Gwangju	Sun Yang (4); China	Mack Horton; Australia	Gabriele Detti; Italy
2022 Budapest	Elijah Winnington; Australia	Lukas Märtens; Germany	Guilherme Costa; Brazil
2023 Fukuoka	Samuel Short; Australia	Ahmed Hafnaoui; Tunisia	Lukas Märtens; Germany
2024 Doha	Kim Woo-min; South Korea	Elijah Winnington; Australia	Lukas Märtens; Germany
2025 Singapore	Lukas Märtens; Germany	Samuel Short; Australia	Kim Woo-min; South Korea

Medal table

Rank	Nation	Gold	Silver	Bronze	Total
1	Australia	7	9	0	16
2	China	4	1	1	6
3	Germany	3	2	3	8
4	South Korea	3	0	1	4
5	United States	2	2	3	7
6	Soviet Union	2	1	0	3
7	West Germany	1	0	0	1
8	Tunisia	0	2	1	3
9	East Germany	0	1	2	3
10	Great Britain	0	1	1	2
10	Russia	0	1	1	2
12	Finland	0	1	0	1
12	Japan	0	1	0	1
14	Italy	0	0	3	3
15	Brazil	0	0	1	1
15	Canada	0	0	1	1
15	New Zealand	0	0	1	1
15	Poland	0	0	1	1
15	Romania	0	0	1	1
15	Sweden	0	0	1	1
Totals (20 entries)		22	22	22	66

=== 800 metre freestyle ===
Year	Gold	Silver	Bronze
2001 Fukuoka	Ian Thorpe; Australia	Grant Hackett; Australia	Graeme Smith; Great Britain
2003 Barcelona	Grant Hackett; Australia	Larsen Jensen; United States	Igor Chervynskyi; Ukraine
2005 Montreal	Grant Hackett; Australia	Larsen Jensen; United States	Yury Prilukov; Russia
2007 Melbourne	Przemysław Stańczyk; Poland	Craig Stevens; Australia	Federico Colbertaldo; Italy
2009 Rome	Zhang Lin; China	Oussama Mellouli; Tunisia	Ryan Cochrane; Canada
2011 Shanghai	Sun Yang; China	Ryan Cochrane; Canada	Gergő Kis; Hungary
2013 Barcelona	Sun Yang; China	Michael McBroom; United States	Ryan Cochrane; Canada
2015 Kazan	Sun Yang (3); China	Gregorio Paltrinieri; Italy	Mack Horton; Australia
2017 Budapest	Gabriele Detti; Italy	Wojciech Wojdak; Poland	Gregorio Paltrinieri; Italy
2019 Gwangju	Gregorio Paltrinieri; Italy	Henrik Christiansen; Norway	David Aubry; France
2022 Budapest	Bobby Finke; United States	Florian Wellbrock; Germany	Mykhailo Romanchuk; Ukraine
2023 Fukuoka	Ahmed Hafnaoui; Tunisia	Samuel Short; Australia	Bobby Finke; United States
2024 Doha	Daniel Wiffen; Ireland	Elijah Winnington; Australia	Gregorio Paltrinieri; Italy
2025 Singapore	Ahmed Jaouadi; Tunisia	Sven Schwarz; Germany	Lukas Märtens; Germany

Medal table

Rank	Nation	Gold	Silver	Bronze	Total
1	China	4	0	0	4
2	Australia	3	4	1	8
3	Italy	2	1	3	6
4	Tunisia	2	1	0	3
5	United States	1	3	1	5
6	Poland	1	1	0	2
7	Ireland	1	0	0	1
8	Germany	0	2	1	3
9	Canada	0	1	2	3
10	Norway	0	1	0	1
11	Ukraine	0	0	2	2
12	France	0	0	1	1
12	Great Britain	0	0	1	1
12	Hungary	0	0	1	1
12	Russia	0	0	1	1
Totals (15 entries)		14	14	14	42

=== 1500 metre freestyle ===
Year	Gold	Silver	Bronze
1973 Belgrade	Stephen Holland; Australia	Rick DeMont; United States	Brad Cooper; Australia
1975 Cali	Timothy Shaw; United States	Brian Goodell; United States	David Parker; Great Britain
1978 West Berlin	Vladimir Salnikov; Soviet Union	Borut Petrič; Yugoslavia	Bobby Hackett; United States
1982 Guayaquil	Vladimir Salnikov; Soviet Union	Svyatoslav Semenov; Soviet Union	Darjan Petrič; Yugoslavia
1986 Madrid	Rainer Henkel; West Germany	Stefano Battistelli; Italy	Dan Jorgensen; United States
1991 Perth	Jörg Hoffmann; Germany	Kieren Perkins; Australia	Stefan Pfeiffer; Germany
1994 Rome	Kieren Perkins; Australia	Daniel Kowalski; Australia	Steffen Zesner; Germany
1998 Perth	Grant Hackett; Australia	Emiliano Brembilla; Italy	Daniel Kowalski; Australia
2001 Fukuoka	Grant Hackett; Australia	Graeme Smith; Great Britain	Alexey Filipets; Russia
2003 Barcelona	Grant Hackett; Australia	Igor Chervynskyi; Ukraine	Erik Vendt; United States
2005 Montreal	Grant Hackett (4); Australia	Larsen Jensen; United States	David Davies; Great Britain
2007 Melbourne	Mateusz Sawrymowicz; Poland	Yury Prilukov; Russia	David Davies; Great Britain
2009 Rome	Oussama Mellouli; Tunisia	Ryan Cochrane; Canada	Sun Yang; China
2011 Shanghai	Sun Yang; China	Ryan Cochrane; Canada	Gergő Kis; Hungary
2013 Barcelona	Sun Yang; China	Ryan Cochrane; Canada	Gregorio Paltrinieri; Italy
2015 Kazan	Gregorio Paltrinieri; Italy	Connor Jaeger; United States	Ryan Cochrane; Canada
2017 Budapest	Gregorio Paltrinieri; Italy	Mykhailo Romanchuk; Ukraine	Mack Horton; Australia
2019 Gwangju	Florian Wellbrock; Germany	Mykhailo Romanchuk; Ukraine	Gregorio Paltrinieri; Italy
2022 Budapest	Gregorio Paltrinieri; Italy	Bobby Finke; United States	Florian Wellbrock; Germany
2023 Fukuoka	Ahmed Hafnaoui; Tunisia	Bobby Finke; United States	Samuel Short; Australia
2024 Doha	Daniel Wiffen; Ireland	Florian Wellbrock; Germany	David Aubry; France
2025 Singapore	Ahmed Jaouadi; Tunisia	Sven Schwarz; Germany	Bobby Finke; United States

Medal table

Rank	Nation	Gold	Silver	Bronze	Total
1	Australia	6	2	4	12
2	Italy	3	2	2	7
3	Tunisia	3	0	0	3
4	Germany	2	2	3	7
5	Soviet Union	2	1	0	3
6	China	2	0	1	3
7	United States	1	6	4	11
8	Ireland	1	0	0	1
8	Poland	1	0	0	1
8	West Germany	1	0	0	1
11	Canada	0	3	1	4
12	Ukraine	0	3	0	3
13	Great Britain	0	1	3	4
14	Russia	0	1	1	2
14	Yugoslavia	0	1	1	2
16	France	0	0	1	1
16	Hungary	0	0	1	1
Totals (17 entries)		22	22	22	66

=== 50 metre backstroke ===
Year	Gold	Silver	Bronze
2001 Fukuoka	Randall Bal; United States	Thomas Rupprath; Germany	Matt Welsh; Australia
2003 Barcelona	Thomas Rupprath; Germany	Matt Welsh; Australia	Gerhard Zandberg; South Africa
2005 Montreal	Aristeidis Grigoriadis; Greece	Matt Welsh; Australia	Liam Tancock; Great Britain
2007 Melbourne	Gerhard Zandberg; South Africa	Thomas Rupprath; Germany	Liam Tancock; Great Britain
2009 Rome	Liam Tancock; Great Britain	Junya Koga; Japan	Gerhard Zandberg; South Africa
2011 Shanghai	Liam Tancock; Great Britain	Camille Lacourt; France	Gerhard Zandberg; South Africa
2013 Barcelona	Camille Lacourt; France	Matt Grevers; United States	none awarded
2013 Barcelona	Camille Lacourt; France	Jérémy Stravius; France	none awarded
2015 Kazan	Camille Lacourt; France	Matt Grevers; United States	Ben Treffers; Australia
2017 Budapest	Camille Lacourt (3); France	Junya Koga; Japan	Matt Grevers; United States
2019 Gwangju	Zane Waddell; South Africa	Evgeny Rylov; Russia	Kliment Kolesnikov; Russia
2022 Budapest	Justin Ress; United States	Hunter Armstrong; United States	Ksawery Masiuk; Poland
2023 Fukuoka	Hunter Armstrong; United States	Justin Ress; United States	Xu Jiayu; China
2024 Doha	Isaac Cooper; Australia	Hunter Armstrong; United States	Ksawery Masiuk; Poland
2025 Singapore	Kliment Kolesnikov; Neutral Athletes B	Pieter Coetze; South Africa	none awarded
2025 Singapore	Kliment Kolesnikov; Neutral Athletes B	Pavel Samusenko; Neutral Athletes B	none awarded

Medal table

Rank	Nation	Gold	Silver	Bronze	Total
1	United States	3	5	1	9
2	France	3	2	0	5
3	South Africa	2	1	3	6
4	Great Britain	2	0	2	4
5	Australia	1	2	2	5
6	Germany	1	2	0	3
7	Neutral Athletes B (Note: At the 2025 World Championships, in accordance with sanctions imposed following by the 2022 Russian invasion of Ukraine, athletes from Russia were not permitted to use the name, flag, or anthem of Russia. They instead participated as "Neutral Athletes B (NAB)" and under the World Aquatics flag.)	1	1	0	2
8	Greece	1	0	0	1
9	Japan	0	2	0	2
10	Russia	0	1	1	2
11	Poland	0	0	2	2
12	China	0	0	1	1
Totals (12 entries)		14	16	12	42

=== 100 metre backstroke ===
Year	Gold	Silver	Bronze
1973 Belgrade	Roland Matthes; East Germany	Mike Stamm; United States	Lutz Wanja; East Germany
1975 Cali	Roland Matthes; East Germany	John Murphy; United States	Melvin Nash; United States
1978 West Berlin	Bob Jackson; United States	Peter Rocca; United States	Rômulo Arantes; Brazil
1982 Guayaquil	Dirk Richter; East Germany	Rick Carey; United States	Vladimir Shemetov; Soviet Union
1986 Madrid	Igor Polyansky; Soviet Union	Dirk Richter; East Germany	Sergei Zabolotnov; Soviet Union
1991 Perth	Jeff Rouse; United States	Mark Tewksbury; Canada	Martín López-Zubero; Spain
1994 Rome	Martín López-Zubero; Spain	Jeff Rouse; United States	Tamás Deutsch; Hungary
1998 Perth	Lenny Krayzelburg; United States	Mark Versfeld; Canada	Stev Theloke; Germany
2001 Fukuoka	Matt Welsh; Australia	Örn Arnarson; Iceland	Steffen Driesen; Germany
2003 Barcelona	Aaron Peirsol; United States	Arkady Vyatchanin; Russia	none awarded
2003 Barcelona	Aaron Peirsol; United States	Matt Welsh; Australia	none awarded
2005 Montreal	Aaron Peirsol; United States	Randall Bal; United States	László Cseh; Hungary
2007 Melbourne	Aaron Peirsol (3); United States	Ryan Lochte; United States	Liam Tancock; Great Britain
2009 Rome	Junya Koga; Japan	Helge Meeuw; Germany	Aschwin Wildeboer; Spain
2011 Shanghai	Camille Lacourt; France	none awarded	Ryosuke Irie; Japan
2011 Shanghai	Jérémy Stravius; France	none awarded	Ryosuke Irie; Japan
2013 Barcelona	Matt Grevers; United States	David Plummer; United States	Jérémy Stravius; France
2015 Kazan	Mitch Larkin; Australia	Camille Lacourt; France	Matt Grevers; United States
2017 Budapest	Xu Jiayu; China	Matt Grevers; United States	Ryan Murphy; United States
2019 Gwangju	Xu Jiayu; China	Evgeny Rylov; Russia	Mitch Larkin; Australia
2022 Budapest	Thomas Ceccon; Italy	Ryan Murphy; United States	Hunter Armstrong; United States
2023 Fukuoka	Ryan Murphy; United States	Thomas Ceccon; Italy	Hunter Armstrong; United States
2024 Doha	Hunter Armstrong; United States	Hugo González; Spain	Apostolos Christou; Greece
2025 Singapore	Pieter Coetze; South Africa	Thomas Ceccon; Italy	Yohann Ndoye-Brouard; France

Medal table

Rank	Nation	Gold	Silver	Bronze	Total
1	United States	9	10	5	24
2	East Germany	3	1	1	5
3	France	2	1	2	5
4	Australia	2	1	1	4
5	China	2	0	0	2
6	Italy	1	2	0	3
7	Spain	1	1	2	4
8	Soviet Union	1	0	2	3
9	Japan	1	0	1	2
10	South Africa	1	0	0	1
11	Canada	0	2	0	2
11	Russia	0	2	0	2
13	Germany	0	1	2	3
14	Iceland	0	1	0	1
15	Hungary	0	0	2	2
16	Brazil	0	0	1	1
16	Great Britain	0	0	1	1
16	Greece	0	0	1	1
Totals (18 entries)		23	22	21	66

=== 200 metre backstroke ===
Year	Gold	Silver	Bronze
1973 Belgrade	Roland Matthes; East Germany	Zoltán Verrasztó; Hungary	John Naber; United States
1975 Cali	Zoltán Verrasztó; Hungary	Mark Tonelli; Australia	Paul Hove; United States
1978 West Berlin	Jesse Vassallo; United States	Gary Hurring; New Zealand	Zoltán Verrasztó; Hungary
1982 Guayaquil	Rick Carey; United States	Sándor Wladár; Hungary	Frank Baltrusch; East Germany
1986 Madrid	Igor Polyansky; Soviet Union	Frank Baltrusch; East Germany	Frank Hoffmeister; West Germany
1991 Perth	Martín López-Zubero; Spain	Stefano Battistelli; Italy	Vladimir Selkov; Soviet Union
1994 Rome	Vladimir Selkov; Russia	Martín López-Zubero; Spain	Royce Sharp; United States
1998 Perth	Lenny Krayzelburg; United States	Ralf Braun; Germany	Mark Versfeld; Canada
2001 Fukuoka	Aaron Peirsol; United States	Markus Rogan; Austria	Örn Arnarson; Iceland
2003 Barcelona	Aaron Peirsol; United States	Gordan Kožulj; Croatia	Simon Dufour; France
2005 Montreal	Aaron Peirsol; United States	Markus Rogan; Austria	Ryan Lochte; United States
2007 Melbourne	Ryan Lochte; United States	Aaron Peirsol; United States	Markus Rogan; Austria
2009 Rome	Aaron Peirsol (4); United States	Ryosuke Irie; Japan	Ryan Lochte; United States
2011 Shanghai	Ryan Lochte; United States	Ryosuke Irie; Japan	Tyler Clary; United States
2013 Barcelona	Ryan Lochte; United States	Radosław Kawęcki; Poland	Tyler Clary; United States
2015 Kazan	Mitch Larkin; Australia	Radosław Kawęcki; Poland	Evgeny Rylov; Russia
2017 Budapest	Evgeny Rylov; Russia	Ryan Murphy; United States	Jacob Pebley; United States
2019 Gwangju	Evgeny Rylov; Russia	Ryan Murphy; United States	Luke Greenbank; Great Britain
2022 Budapest	Ryan Murphy; United States	Luke Greenbank; Great Britain	Shaine Casas; United States
2023 Fukuoka	Hubert Kós; Hungary	Ryan Murphy; United States	Roman Mityukov; Switzerland
2024 Doha	Hugo González; Spain	Roman Mityukov; Switzerland	Pieter Coetze; South Africa
2025 Singapore	Hubert Kós; Hungary	Pieter Coetze; South Africa	Yohann Ndoye-Brouard; France

Medal table

Rank	Nation	Gold	Silver	Bronze	Total
1	United States	11	4	9	24
2	Hungary	3	2	1	6
3	Russia	3	0	1	4
4	Spain	2	1	0	3
5	East Germany	1	1	1	3
6	Australia	1	1	0	2
7	Soviet Union	1	0	1	2
8	Austria	0	2	1	3
9	Japan	0	2	0	2
9	Poland	0	2	0	2
11	Great Britain	0	1	1	2
11	South Africa	0	1	1	2
11	Switzerland	0	1	1	2
14	Croatia	0	1	0	1
14	Germany	0	1	0	1
14	Italy	0	1	0	1
14	New Zealand	0	1	0	1
18	France	0	0	2	2
19	Canada	0	0	1	1
19	Iceland	0	0	1	1
19	West Germany	0	0	1	1
Totals (21 entries)		22	22	22	66

=== 50 metre breaststroke ===
Year	Gold	Silver	Bronze
2001 Fukuoka	Oleh Lisohor; Ukraine	Roman Sludnov; Russia	Domenico Fioravanti; Italy
2003 Barcelona	James Gibson; Great Britain	Oleh Lisohor; Ukraine	Mihály Flaskay; Hungary
2005 Montreal	Mark Warnecke; Germany	Mark Gangloff; United States	Kosuke Kitajima; Japan
2007 Melbourne	Oleh Lisohor; Ukraine	Brendan Hansen; United States	Cameron van der Burgh; South Africa
2009 Rome	Cameron van der Burgh; South Africa	Felipe França Silva; Brazil	Mark Gangloff; United States
2011 Shanghai	Felipe França Silva; Brazil	Fabio Scozzoli; Italy	Cameron van der Burgh; South Africa
2013 Barcelona	Cameron van der Burgh; South Africa	Christian Sprenger; Australia	Giulio Zorzi; South Africa
2015 Kazan	Adam Peaty; Great Britain	Cameron van der Burgh; South Africa	Kevin Cordes; United States
2017 Budapest	Adam Peaty; Great Britain	João Gomes Júnior; Brazil	Cameron van der Burgh; South Africa
2019 Gwangju	Adam Peaty (3); Great Britain	Felipe Lima; Brazil	João Gomes Júnior; Brazil
2022 Budapest	Nic Fink; United States	Nicolò Martinenghi; Italy	Michael Andrew; United States
2023 Fukuoka	Qin Haiyang; China	Nic Fink; United States	Sun Jiajun; China
2024 Doha	Samuel Williamson; Australia	Nicolò Martinenghi; Italy	Nic Fink; United States
2025 Singapore	Simone Cerasuolo; Italy	Kirill Prigoda; Neutral Athletes B	Qin Haiyang; China

Medal table

Rank	Nation	Gold	Silver	Bronze	Total
1	Great Britain	4	0	0	4
2	South Africa	2	1	4	7
3	Ukraine	2	1	0	3
4	United States	1	3	4	8
5	Brazil	1	3	1	5
5	Italy	1	3	1	5
7	Australia	1	1	0	2
8	China	1	0	2	3
9	Germany	1	0	0	1
10	Neutral Athletes B	0	1	0	1
10	Russia	0	1	0	1
12	Hungary	0	0	1	1
12	Japan	0	0	1	1
Totals (13 entries)		14	14	14	42

=== 100 metre breaststroke ===
Year	Gold	Silver	Bronze
1973 Belgrade	John Hencken; United States	Mikhail Khryukin; Soviet Union	Nobutaka Taguchi; Japan
1975 Cali	David Wilkie; Great Britain	Nobutaka Taguchi; Japan	David Leigh; Great Britain
1978 West Berlin	Walter Kusch; West Germany	Graham Smith; Canada	Gerald Mörken; West Germany
1982 Guayaquil	Steve Lundquist; United States	Victor Davis; Canada	John Moffet; United States
1986 Madrid	Victor Davis; Canada	Gianni Minervini; Italy	Dmitry Volkov; Soviet Union
1991 Perth	Norbert Rózsa; Hungary	Adrian Moorhouse; Great Britain	Gianni Minervini; Italy
1994 Rome	Norbert Rózsa; Hungary	Károly Güttler; Hungary	Frédérik Deburghgraeve; Belgium
1998 Perth	Frédérik Deburghgraeve; Belgium	Zeng Qiliang; China	Kurt Grote; United States
2001 Fukuoka	Roman Sludnov; Russia	Domenico Fioravanti; Italy	Ed Moses; United States
2003 Barcelona	Kosuke Kitajima; Japan	Brendan Hansen; United States	James Gibson; Great Britain
2005 Montreal	Brendan Hansen; United States	Kosuke Kitajima; Japan	Hugues Duboscq; France
2007 Melbourne	Brendan Hansen; United States	Kosuke Kitajima; Japan	Brenton Rickard; Australia
2009 Rome	Brenton Rickard; Australia	Hugues Duboscq; France	Cameron van der Burgh; South Africa
2011 Shanghai	Alexander Dale Oen; Norway	Fabio Scozzoli; Italy	Cameron van der Burgh; South Africa
2013 Barcelona	Christian Sprenger; Australia	Cameron van der Burgh; South Africa	Felipe Lima; Brazil
2015 Kazan	Adam Peaty; Great Britain	Cameron van der Burgh; South Africa	Ross Murdoch; Great Britain
2017 Budapest	Adam Peaty; Great Britain	Kevin Cordes; United States	Kirill Prigoda; Russia
2019 Gwangju	Adam Peaty (3); Great Britain	James Wilby; Great Britain	Yan Zibei; China
2022 Budapest	Nicolò Martinenghi; Italy	Arno Kamminga; Netherlands	Nic Fink; United States
2023 Fukuoka	Qin Haiyang; China	Nic Fink; United States	none awarded
2023 Fukuoka	Qin Haiyang; China	Arno Kamminga; Netherlands	none awarded
2023 Fukuoka	Qin Haiyang; China	Nicolò Martinenghi; Italy	none awarded
2024 Doha	Nic Fink; United States	Nicolò Martinenghi; Italy	Adam Peaty; Great Britain
2025 Singapore	Qin Haiyang; China	Nicolò Martinenghi; Italy	Denis Petrashov; Kyrgyzstan

Medal table

Rank	Nation	Gold	Silver	Bronze	Total
1	United States	5	3	4	12
2	Great Britain	4	2	4	10
3	China	2	1	1	4
4	Hungary	2	1	0	3
5	Australia	2	0	1	3
6	Italy	1	6	1	8
7	Japan	1	3	1	5
8	Canada	1	2	0	3
9	Belgium	1	0	1	2
9	Russia	1	0	1	2
9	West Germany	1	0	1	2
12	Norway	1	0	0	1
13	South Africa	0	2	2	4
14	Netherlands	0	2	0	2
15	France	0	1	1	2
15	Soviet Union	0	1	1	2
17	Brazil	0	0	1	1
17	Kyrgyzstan	0	0	1	1
Totals (18 entries)		22	24	21	67

=== 200 metre breaststroke ===
Year	Gold	Silver	Bronze
1973 Belgrade	David Wilkie; Great Britain	John Hencken; United States	Nobutaka Taguchi; Japan
1975 Cali	David Wilkie; Great Britain	Rick Colella; United States	Nikolai Pankin; Soviet Union
1978 West Berlin	Nicholas Nevid; United States	Arsens Miskarovs; Soviet Union	Walter Kusch; West Germany
1982 Guayaquil	Victor Davis; Canada	Robertas Žulpa; Soviet Union	John Moffet; United States
1986 Madrid	József Szabó; Hungary	Victor Davis; Canada	Steven Bentley; United States
1991 Perth	Mike Barrowman; United States	Norbert Rózsa; Hungary	Nicholas Gillingham; Great Britain
1994 Rome	Norbert Rózsa; Hungary	Eric Wunderlich; United States	Károly Güttler; Hungary
1998 Perth	Kurt Grote; United States	Jean-Christophe Sarnin; France	Norbert Rózsa; Hungary
2001 Fukuoka	Brendan Hansen; United States	Maxim Podoprigora; Austria	Kosuke Kitajima; Japan
2003 Barcelona	Kosuke Kitajima; Japan	Ian Edmond; Great Britain	Brendan Hansen; United States
2005 Montreal	Brendan Hansen; United States	Mike Brown; Canada	Genki Imamura; Japan
2007 Melbourne	Kosuke Kitajima; Japan	Brenton Rickard; Australia	Loris Facci; Italy
2009 Rome	Dániel Gyurta; Hungary	Eric Shanteau; United States	Christian Sprenger; Australia
2009 Rome	Dániel Gyurta; Hungary	Eric Shanteau; United States	Giedrius Titenis; Lithuania
2011 Shanghai	Dániel Gyurta; Hungary	Kosuke Kitajima; Japan	Christian vom Lehn; Germany
2013 Barcelona	Dániel Gyurta (3); Hungary	Marco Koch; Germany	Matti Mattsson; Finland
2015 Kazan	Marco Koch; Germany	Kevin Cordes; United States	Dániel Gyurta; Hungary
2017 Budapest	Anton Chupkov; Russia	Yasuhiro Koseki; Japan	Ippei Watanabe; Japan
2019 Gwangju	Anton Chupkov; Russia	Matthew Wilson; Australia	Ippei Watanabe; Japan
2022 Budapest	Zac Stubblety-Cook; Australia	Yu Hanaguruma; Japan	none awarded
2022 Budapest	Zac Stubblety-Cook; Australia	Erik Persson; Sweden	none awarded
2023 Fukuoka	Qin Haiyang; China	Zac Stubblety-Cook; Australia	Matt Fallon; United States
2024 Doha	Dong Zhihao; China	Caspar Corbeau; Netherlands	Nic Fink; United States
2025 Singapore	Qin Haiyang; China	Ippei Watanabe; Japan	Caspar Corbeau; Netherlands

Medal table

Rank	Nation	Gold	Silver	Bronze	Total
1	United States	5	5	5	15
2	Hungary	5	1	3	9
3	China	3	0	0	3
4	Japan	2	4	5	11
5	Great Britain	2	1	1	4
6	Russia	2	0	0	2
7	Australia	1	3	1	5
8	Canada	1	2	0	3
9	Germany	1	1	1	3
10	Soviet Union	0	2	1	3
11	Netherlands	0	1	1	2
12	Austria	0	1	0	1
12	France	0	1	0	1
12	Sweden	0	1	0	1
15	Finland	0	0	1	1
15	Italy	0	0	1	1
15	Lithuania	0	0	1	1
15	West Germany	0	0	1	1
Totals (18 entries)		22	23	22	67

=== 50 metre butterfly ===
Year	Gold	Silver	Bronze
2001 Fukuoka	Geoff Huegill; Australia	Lars Frölander; Sweden	Mark Foster; Great Britain
2003 Barcelona	Matt Welsh; Australia	Ian Crocker; United States	Yevgeny Korotyshkin; Russia
2005 Montreal	Roland Schoeman; South Africa	Ian Crocker; United States	Sergiy Breus; Ukraine
2007 Melbourne	Roland Schoeman (2); South Africa	Ian Crocker; United States	Jakob Andkjær; Denmark
2009 Rome	Milorad Čavić; Serbia	Matt Targett; Australia	Rafael Muñoz; Spain
2011 Shanghai	César Cielo; Brazil	Matt Targett; Australia	Geoff Huegill; Australia
2013 Barcelona	César Cielo (2); Brazil	Eugene Godsoe; United States	Frédérick Bousquet; France
2015 Kazan	Florent Manaudou; France	Nicholas Santos; Brazil	László Cseh; Hungary
2015 Kazan	Florent Manaudou; France	Nicholas Santos; Brazil	Konrad Czerniak; Poland
2017 Budapest	Ben Proud; Great Britain	Nicholas Santos; Brazil	Andriy Govorov; Ukraine
2019 Gwangju	Caeleb Dressel; United States	Oleg Kostin; Russia	Nicholas Santos; Brazil
2022 Budapest	Caeleb Dressel (2); United States	Nicholas Santos; Brazil	Michael Andrew; United States
2023 Fukuoka	Thomas Ceccon; Italy	Diogo Ribeiro; Portugal	Maxime Grousset; France
2024 Doha	Diogo Ribeiro; Portugal	Michael Andrew; United States	Cameron McEvoy; Australia
2025 Singapore	Maxime Grousset; France	Noè Ponti; Switzerland	Thomas Ceccon; Italy

Medal table

Rank	Nation	Gold	Silver	Bronze	Total
1	United States	2	5	1	8
2	Brazil	2	3	1	6
3	Australia	2	2	2	6
4	France	2	0	2	4
5	South Africa	2	0	0	2
6	Portugal	1	1	0	2
7	Great Britain	1	0	1	2
7	Italy	1	0	1	2
9	Serbia	1	0	0	1
10	Russia	0	1	1	2
11	Sweden	0	1	0	1
11	Switzerland	0	1	0	1
13	Ukraine	0	0	2	2
14	Denmark	0	0	1	1
14	Hungary	0	0	1	1
14	Poland	0	0	1	1
14	Spain	0	0	1	1
Totals (17 entries)		14	14	15	43

=== 100 metre butterfly ===
Year	Gold	Silver	Bronze
1973 Belgrade	Bruce Robertson; Canada	Joe Bottom; United States	Robin Backhaus; United States
1975 Cali	Gregory Jagenburg; United States	Roger Pyttel; East Germany	Bill Forrester; United States
1978 West Berlin	Joe Bottom; United States	Gregory Jagenburg; United States	Pär Arvidsson; Sweden
1982 Guayaquil	Matt Gribble; United States	Michael Gross; West Germany	Bengt Baron; Sweden
1986 Madrid	Pablo Morales; United States	Matt Biondi; United States	Andrew Jameson; Great Britain
1991 Perth	Anthony Nesty; Suriname	Michael Gross; Germany	Vladislav Kulikov; Soviet Union
1994 Rome	Rafał Szukała; Poland	Lars Frölander; Sweden	Denis Pankratov; Russia
1998 Perth	Michael Klim; Australia	Lars Frölander; Sweden	Geoff Huegill; Australia
2001 Fukuoka	Lars Frölander; Sweden	Ian Crocker; United States	Geoff Huegill; Australia
2003 Barcelona	Ian Crocker; United States	Michael Phelps; United States	Andriy Serdinov; Ukraine
2005 Montreal	Ian Crocker; United States	Michael Phelps; United States	Andriy Serdinov; Ukraine
2007 Melbourne	Michael Phelps; United States	Ian Crocker; United States	Albert Subirats; Venezuela
2009 Rome	Michael Phelps; United States	Milorad Čavić; Serbia	Rafael Muñoz; Spain
2011 Shanghai	Michael Phelps (3); United States	Konrad Czerniak; Poland	Tyler McGill; United States
2013 Barcelona	Chad le Clos; South Africa	László Cseh; Hungary	Konrad Czerniak; Poland
2015 Kazan	Chad le Clos; South Africa	László Cseh; Hungary	Joseph Schooling; Singapore
2017 Budapest	Caeleb Dressel; United States	Kristóf Milák; Hungary	James Guy; Great Britain
2017 Budapest	Caeleb Dressel; United States	Kristóf Milák; Hungary	Joseph Schooling; Singapore
2019 Gwangju	Caeleb Dressel; United States	Andrey Minakov; Russia	Chad le Clos; South Africa
2022 Budapest	Kristóf Milák; Hungary	Naoki Mizunuma; Japan	Joshua Liendo; Canada
2023 Fukuoka	Maxime Grousset; France	Joshua Liendo; Canada	Dare Rose; United States
2024 Doha	Diogo Ribeiro; Portugal	Simon Bucher; Austria	Jakub Majerski; Poland
2025 Singapore	Maxime Grousset; France	Noè Ponti; Switzerland	Ilya Kharun; Canada

Medal table

Rank	Nation	Gold	Silver	Bronze	Total
1	United States	11	7	4	22
2	South Africa	2	0	1	3
3	France	2	0	0	2
4	Hungary	1	3	0	4
5	Sweden	1	2	2	5
6	Canada	1	1	2	4
6	Poland	1	1	2	4
8	Australia	1	0	2	3
9	Portugal	1	0	0	1
9	Suriname	1	0	0	1
11	Russia	0	1	1	2
12	Austria	0	1	0	1
12	East Germany	0	1	0	1
12	Germany	0	1	0	1
12	Japan	0	1	0	1
12	Serbia	0	1	0	1
12	Switzerland	0	1	0	1
12	West Germany	0	1	0	1
19	Great Britain	0	0	2	2
19	Singapore	0	0	2	2
19	Ukraine	0	0	2	2
22	Soviet Union	0	0	1	1
22	Spain	0	0	1	1
22	Venezuela	0	0	1	1
Totals (24 entries)		22	22	23	67

=== 200 metre butterfly ===
Year	Gold	Silver	Bronze
1973 Belgrade	Robin Backhaus; United States	Steve Gregg; United States	Hartmut Flöckner; East Germany
1975 Cali	Bill Forrester; United States	Roger Pyttel; East Germany	Brian Brinkley; Great Britain
1978 West Berlin	Mike Bruner; United States	Steve Gregg; United States	Roger Pyttel; East Germany
1982 Guayaquil	Michael Gross; West Germany	Sergey Fesenko; Soviet Union	Craig Beardsley; United States
1986 Madrid	Michael Gross; West Germany	Anthony Mosse; New Zealand	Benny Nielsen; Denmark
1991 Perth	Melvin Stewart; United States	Michael Gross; Germany	Tamás Darnyi; Hungary
1994 Rome	Denis Pankratov; Russia	Danyon Loader; New Zealand	Chris-Carol Bremer; Germany
1998 Perth	Denys Sylantyev; Ukraine	Franck Esposito; France	Tom Malchow; United States
2001 Fukuoka	Michael Phelps; United States	Tom Malchow; United States	Anatoly Polyakov; Russia
2003 Barcelona	Michael Phelps; United States	Takashi Yamamoto; Japan	Tom Malchow; United States
2005 Montreal	Paweł Korzeniowski; Poland	Takeshi Matsuda; Japan	Wu Peng; China
2007 Melbourne	Michael Phelps; United States	Wu Peng; China	Nikolay Skvortsov; Russia
2009 Rome	Michael Phelps; United States	Paweł Korzeniowski; Poland	Takeshi Matsuda; Japan
2011 Shanghai	Michael Phelps (5); United States	Takeshi Matsuda; Japan	Wu Peng; China
2013 Barcelona	Chad le Clos; South Africa	Paweł Korzeniowski; Poland	Wu Peng; China
2015 Kazan	László Cseh; Hungary	Chad le Clos; South Africa	Jan Świtkowski; Poland
2017 Budapest	Chad le Clos; South Africa	László Cseh; Hungary	Daiya Seto; Japan
2019 Gwangju	Kristóf Milák; Hungary	Daiya Seto; Japan	Chad le Clos; South Africa
2022 Budapest	Kristóf Milák; Hungary	Léon Marchand; France	Tomoru Honda; Japan
2023 Fukuoka	Léon Marchand; France	Krzysztof Chmielewski; Poland	Tomoru Honda; Japan
2024 Doha	Tomoru Honda; Japan	Alberto Razzetti; Italy	Martin Espernberger; Austria
2025 Singapore	Luca Urlando; United States	Krzysztof Chmielewski; Poland	Harrison Turner; Australia

Medal table

Rank	Nation	Gold	Silver	Bronze	Total
1	United States	10	3	3	16
2	Hungary	3	1	1	5
3	South Africa	2	1	1	4
4	West Germany	2	0	0	2
5	Japan	1	4	4	9
6	Poland	1	4	1	6
7	France	1	2	0	3
8	Russia	1	0	2	3
9	Ukraine	1	0	0	1
10	New Zealand	0	2	0	2
11	China	0	1	3	4
12	East Germany	0	1	2	3
13	Germany	0	1	1	2
14	Italy	0	1	0	1
14	Soviet Union	0	1	0	1
16	Australia	0	0	1	1
16	Austria	0	0	1	1
16	Denmark	0	0	1	1
16	Great Britain	0	0	1	1
Totals (19 entries)		22	22	22	66

=== 200 metre individual medley ===
Year	Gold	Silver	Bronze
1973 Belgrade	Gunnar Larsson; Sweden	Stanley Carper; United States	David Wilkie; Great Britain
1975 Cali	András Hargitay; Hungary	Steve Furniss; United States	Andrey Smirnov; Soviet Union
1978 West Berlin	Graham Smith; Canada	Jesse Vassallo; United States	Aleksandr Sidorenko; Soviet Union
1982 Guayaquil	Aleksandr Sidorenko; Soviet Union	Bill Barrett; United States	Giovanni Franceschi; Italy
1986 Madrid	Tamás Darnyi; Hungary	Alex Baumann; Canada	Vadim Yaroshchuk; Soviet Union
1991 Perth	Tamás Darnyi; Hungary	Eric Namesnik; United States	Christian Gessner; Germany
1994 Rome	Jani Sievinen; Finland	Greg Burgess; United States	Attila Czene; Hungary
1998 Perth	Marcel Wouda; Netherlands	Xavier Marchand; France	Ron Karnaugh; United States
2001 Fukuoka	Massimiliano Rosolino; Italy	Tom Wilkens; United States	Justin Norris; Australia
2003 Barcelona	Michael Phelps; United States	Ian Thorpe; Australia	Massimiliano Rosolino; Italy
2005 Montreal	Michael Phelps; United States	László Cseh; Hungary	Ryan Lochte; United States
2007 Melbourne	Michael Phelps; United States	Ryan Lochte; United States	László Cseh; Hungary
2009 Rome	Ryan Lochte; United States	László Cseh; Hungary	Eric Shanteau; United States
2011 Shanghai	Ryan Lochte; United States	Michael Phelps; United States	László Cseh; Hungary
2013 Barcelona	Ryan Lochte; United States	Kosuke Hagino; Japan	Thiago Pereira; Brazil
2015 Kazan	Ryan Lochte (4); United States	Thiago Pereira; Brazil	Wang Shun; China
2017 Budapest	Chase Kalisz; United States	Kosuke Hagino; Japan	Wang Shun; China
2019 Gwangju	Daiya Seto; Japan	Jérémy Desplanches; Switzerland	Chase Kalisz; United States
2022 Budapest	Léon Marchand; France	Carson Foster; United States	Daiya Seto; Japan
2023 Fukuoka	Léon Marchand; France	Duncan Scott; Great Britain	Tom Dean; Great Britain
2024 Doha	Finlay Knox; Canada	Carson Foster; United States	Alberto Razzetti; Italy
2025 Singapore	Léon Marchand; France	Shaine Casas; United States	Hubert Kós; Hungary

Medal table

Rank	Nation	Gold	Silver	Bronze	Total
1	United States	8	12	4	24
2	Hungary	3	2	4	9
3	France	3	1	0	4
4	Canada	2	1	0	3
5	Japan	1	2	1	4
6	Italy	1	0	3	4
6	Soviet Union	1	0	3	4
8	Finland	1	0	0	1
8	Netherlands	1	0	0	1
8	Sweden	1	0	0	1
11	Great Britain	0	1	2	3
12	Australia	0	1	1	2
12	Brazil	0	1	1	2
14	Switzerland	0	1	0	1
15	China	0	0	2	2
16	Germany	0	0	1	1
Totals (16 entries)		22	22	22	66

=== 400 metre individual medley ===
Year	Gold	Silver	Bronze
1973 Belgrade	András Hargitay; Hungary	Rod Strachan; United States	Rick Colella; United States
1975 Cali	András Hargitay; Hungary	Andrey Smirnov; Soviet Union	Hans-Joachim Geisler; West Germany
1978 West Berlin	Jesse Vassallo; United States	Sergey Fesenko; Soviet Union	András Hargitay; Hungary
1982 Guayaquil	Ricardo Prado; Brazil	Jens-Peter Berndt; East Germany	Sergey Fesenko; Soviet Union
1986 Madrid	Tamás Darnyi; Hungary	Vadim Yaroshchuk; Soviet Union	Alex Baumann; Canada
1991 Perth	Tamás Darnyi; Hungary	Eric Namesnik; United States	Stefano Battistelli; Italy
1994 Rome	Tom Dolan; United States	Jani Sievinen; Finland	Eric Namesnik; United States
1998 Perth	Tom Dolan; United States	Marcel Wouda; Netherlands	Curtis Myden; Canada
2001 Fukuoka	Alessio Boggiatto; Italy	Erik Vendt; United States	Tom Wilkens; United States
2003 Barcelona	Michael Phelps; United States	László Cseh; Hungary	Oussama Mellouli; Tunisia
2005 Montreal	László Cseh; Hungary	Luca Marin; Italy	Oussama Mellouli; Tunisia
2007 Melbourne	Michael Phelps; United States	Ryan Lochte; United States	Luca Marin; Italy
2009 Rome	Ryan Lochte; United States	Tyler Clary; United States	László Cseh; Hungary
2011 Shanghai	Ryan Lochte; United States	Tyler Clary; United States	Yuya Horihata; Japan
2013 Barcelona	Daiya Seto; Japan	Chase Kalisz; United States	Thiago Pereira; Brazil
2015 Kazan	Daiya Seto; Japan	Dávid Verrasztó; Hungary	Chase Kalisz; United States
2017 Budapest	Chase Kalisz; United States	Dávid Verrasztó; Hungary	Daiya Seto; Japan
2019 Gwangju	Daiya Seto (3); Japan	Jay Litherland; United States	Lewis Clareburt; New Zealand
2022 Budapest	Léon Marchand; France	Carson Foster; United States	Chase Kalisz; United States
2023 Fukuoka	Léon Marchand; France	Carson Foster; United States	Daiya Seto; Japan
2024 Doha	Lewis Clareburt; New Zealand	Max Litchfield; Great Britain	Daiya Seto; Japan
2025 Singapore	Léon Marchand (3); France	Tomoyuki Matsushita; Japan	Ilya Borodin; Neutral Athletes B

Medal table

Rank	Nation	Gold	Silver	Bronze	Total
1	United States	8	10	5	23
2	Hungary	5	3	2	10
3	Japan	3	1	4	8
4	France	3	0	0	3
5	Italy	1	1	2	4
6	Brazil	1	0	1	2
6	New Zealand	1	0	1	2
8	Soviet Union	0	3	1	4
9	East Germany	0	1	0	1
9	Finland	0	1	0	1
9	Great Britain	0	1	0	1
9	Netherlands	0	1	0	1
13	Canada	0	0	2	2
13	Tunisia	0	0	2	2
15	Neutral Athletes B	0	0	1	1
15	West Germany	0	0	1	1
Totals (16 entries)		22	22	22	66

=== 4 × 100 metre freestyle relay ===
Year	Gold	Silver	Bronze
1973 Belgrade	United States (USA); Melvin Nash; Joe Bottom; Jim Montgomery; John Murphy; Bill Miller*; Stanley Carper*; Kurt Krumpholz*; Richard Klatt*	Soviet Union (URS); Igor Grivennikov; Viktor Aboimov; Vladimir Krivtsov; Vladimir Bure; Leonid Dragunov*	East Germany (GDR); Roland Matthes; Roger Pyttel; Peter Bruch; Hartmut Flöckner; Wilfried Hartung*; Lutz Unger*
1975 Cali	United States (USA); Bruce Furniss; Jim Montgomery; Andy Coan; John Murphy; Melvin Nash*; Robin Backhaus*; Tim McDonnell*; Joe Bottom*	West Germany (FRG); Klaus Steinbach; Dirk Braunleder; Kersten Meier; Peter Nocke	Italy (ITA); Roberto Pangaro; Paolo Barelli; Claudio Zei; Marcello Guarducci
1978 West Berlin	United States (USA); Jack Babashoff; Rowdy Gaines; Jim Montgomery (3); David McCagg; Mark Greenwood*; David Dickson*; David Larson*; Joe Bottom*	West Germany (FRG); Andreas Schmidt; Ulrich Temps; Peter Knust; Klaus Steinbach; Kersten Meier*; Karsten Lippmann*	Sweden (SWE); Per Holmertz; Dan Larsson; Per-Ola Quist; Per-Alvar Magnusson
1982 Guayaquil	United States (USA); Chris Cavanaugh; Robin Leamy; David McCagg; Rowdy Gaines; Bill Barrett*; Tom Jager*; Richard Saeger*; Matt Gribble*	Soviet Union (URS); Sergey Krasyuk; Alexey Filonov; Sergey Smiryagin; Aleksey Markovsky	Sweden (SWE); Per Johansson; Bengt Baron; Per Holmertz; Per Wikström; Michael Söderlund*; Per-Alvar Magnusson*
1986 Madrid	United States (USA); Tom Jager; Mike Heath; Paul Wallace; Matt Biondi; Jim Born*; Asa Lawrence*	Soviet Union (URS); Gennady Prigoda; Nikolay Yevseyev; Sergey Smiryagin; Aleksey Markovsky; Veniamin Tayanovich*	East Germany (GDR); Dirk Richter; Jörg Woithe; Sven Lodziewski; Steffen Zesner; Matthias Lutze*
1991 Perth	United States (USA); Tom Jager; Brent Lang; Doug Gjersten; Matt Biondi; Troy Dalbey*	Germany (GER); Peter Sitt; Dirk Richter; Steffen Zesner; Bengt Zikarsky; Nils Rudolph*; Christian Tröger*	Soviet Union (URS); Gennady Prigoda; Yuri Bashkatov; Veniamin Tayanovich; Vladimir Tkacenko; Alexei Borislavski*
1994 Rome	United States (USA); Jon Olsen; Josh Davis; Uğur Taner; Gary Hall, Jr. Scott Jett*; Chris Eckerman*	Russia (RUS); Roman Shchegolev; Vladimir Predkin; Vladimir Pyshnenko; Alexander Popov; Vladislav Kulikov*; Yury Mukhin*	Brazil (BRA); Fernando Scherer; Teófilo Ferreira; André Teixeira; Gustavo Borges
1998 Perth	United States (USA); Scott Tucker; Jon Olsen; Neil Walker; Gary Hall, Jr. Bryan Jones*; Brad Schumacher*	Australia (AUS); Michael Klim; Richard Upton; Adam Pine; Chris Fydler; Nathan Rickard*; Anthony Rogis*	Russia (RUS); Alexander Popov; Vladislav Kulikov; Roman Yegorov; Denis Pimankov; Maxim Korshunov*
2001 Fukuoka	Australia (AUS); Michael Klim; Ashley Callus; Todd Pearson; Ian Thorpe; David Jenkins*; Adam Pine*	Netherlands (NED); Mark Veens; Johan Kenkhuis; Klaas-Erik Zwering; Pieter van den Hoogenband; Ewout Holst*	Germany (GER); Stefan Herbst; Torsten Spanneberg; Lars Conrad; Sven Lodziewski
2003 Barcelona	Russia (RUS); Andrey Kapralov; Ivan Usov; Denis Pimankov; Alexander Popov; Dmitri Talepov*	United States (USA); Scott Tucker; Neil Walker; Ryan Wochomurka; Jason Lezak; Randall Bal*; Nate Dusing*	France (FRA); Romain Barnier; Julien Sicot; Fabien Gilot; Frédérick Bousquet
2005 Montreal	United States (USA); Michael Phelps; Neil Walker; Nate Dusing; Jason Lezak; Ben Wildman-Tobriner*; Garrett Weber-Gale*	Canada (CAN); Yannick Lupien; Rick Say; Mike Mintenko; Brent Hayden	Australia (AUS); Michael Klim; Andrew Mewing; Leith Brodie; Patrick Murphy
2007 Melbourne	United States (USA); Michael Phelps; Neil Walker (3); Cullen Jones; Jason Lezak; Garrett Weber-Gale*; Ben Wildman-Tobriner*	Italy (ITA); Massimiliano Rosolino; Alessandro Calvi; Christian Galenda; Filippo Magnini; Lorenzo Vismara*	France (FRA); Fabien Gilot; Frédérick Bousquet; Julien Sicot; Alain Bernard; Grégory Mallet*; Amaury Leveaux*
2009 Rome	United States (USA); Michael Phelps (3); Ryan Lochte; Matt Grevers; Nathan Adrian; Garrett Weber-Gale*; Ricky Berens*; Cullen Jones*	Russia (RUS); Yevgeny Lagunov; Andrey Grechin; Danila Izotov; Alexander Sukhorukov; Nikita Konovalov*	France (FRA); Fabien Gilot; Alain Bernard; Grégory Mallet; Frédérick Bousquet; Amaury Leveaux*; William Meynard*
2011 Shanghai	Australia (AUS); James Magnussen; Matt Targett; Matthew Abood; Eamon Sullivan; Kyle Richardson*; James Roberts*	France (FRA); Fabien Gilot; Alain Bernard; Jérémy Stravius; William Meynard	United States (USA); Michael Phelps; Garrett Weber-Gale; Jason Lezak; Nathan Adrian; Ryan Lochte*; Scot Robison*; David Walters*
2013 Barcelona	France (FRA); Yannick Agnel; Florent Manaudou; Fabien Gilot; Jérémy Stravius; Amaury Leveaux*; Grégory Mallet*; William Meynard*	United States (USA); Nathan Adrian; Ryan Lochte; Anthony Ervin; James Feigen; Ricky Berens*; Conor Dwyer*	Russia (RUS); Andrey Grechin; Nikita Lobintsev; Vladimir Morozov; Danila Izotov; Yevgeny Lagunov*; Alexander Sukhorukov*
2015 Kazan	France (FRA); Mehdy Metella; Florent Manaudou; Fabien Gilot; Jérémy Stravius; Lorys Bourelly*; Clément Mignon*	Russia (RUS); Andrey Grechin; Nikita Lobintsev; Vladimir Morozov; Alexander Sukhorukov; Danila Izotov*	Italy (ITA); Luca Dotto; Marco Orsi; Michele Santucci; Filippo Magnini
2017 Budapest	United States (USA); Caeleb Dressel; Townley Haas; Blake Pieroni; Nathan Adrian; Michael Chadwick*; Zach Apple*	Brazil (BRA); Gabriel Santos; Marcelo Chierighini; César Cielo; Bruno Fratus	Hungary (HUN); Dominik Kozma; Nándor Németh; Péter Holoda; Richárd Bohus
2019 Gwangju	United States (USA); Caeleb Dressel; Blake Pieroni; Zach Apple; Nathan Adrian (3); Townley Haas*; Michael Chadwick*	Russia (RUS); Vladislav Grinev; Vladimir Morozov; Kliment Kolesnikov; Evgeny Rylov; Andrey Minakov*	Australia (AUS); Cameron McEvoy; Clyde Lewis; Alexander Graham; Kyle Chalmers
2022 Budapest	United States (USA); Caeleb Dressel (3); Ryan Held; Justin Ress; Brooks Curry; Hunter Armstrong*	Australia (AUS); William Yang; Matthew Temple; Jack Cartwright; Kyle Chalmers	Italy (ITA); Alessandro Miressi; Thomas Ceccon; Lorenzo Zazzeri; Manuel Frigo
2023 Fukuoka	Australia (AUS); Jack Cartwright; Flynn Southam; Kai Taylor; Kyle Chalmers; Matthew Temple*	Italy (ITA); Alessandro Miressi; Manuel Frigo; Lorenzo Zazzeri; Thomas Ceccon; Leonardo Deplano*	United States (USA); Ryan Held; Jack Alexy; Chris Guiliano; Matt King; Destin Lasco*; Justin Ress*
2024 Doha	China (CHN); Pan Zhanle; Ji Xinjie; Zhang Zhanshuo; Wang Haoyu	Italy (ITA); Alessandro Miressi; Lorenzo Zazzeri; Paolo Conte Bonin; Manuel Frigo; Leonardo Deplano*	United States (USA); Matt King; Shaine Casas; Luke Hobson; Carson Foster; Hunter Armstrong*; Jack Aikins*
2025 Singapore	Australia (AUS); Flynn Southam; Kai Taylor; Maximillian Giuliani; Kyle Chalmers	Italy (ITA); Carlos D'Ambrosio; Thomas Ceccon; Lorenzo Zazzeri; Manuel Frigo; Leonardo Deplano*	United States (USA); Jack Alexy; Patrick Sammon; Chris Guiliano; Jonny Kulow; Shaine Casas*; Destin Lasco*

* Swimmers who participated in the heats only.

Medal table

Rank	Nation	Gold	Silver	Bronze	Total
1	United States	14	2	4	20
2	Australia	4	2	2	8
3	France	2	1	3	6
4	Russia	1	4	2	7
5	China	1	0	0	1
6	Italy	0	4	3	7
7	Soviet Union	0	3	1	4
8	West Germany	0	2	0	2
9	Brazil	0	1	1	2
9	Germany	0	1	1	2
11	Canada	0	1	0	1
11	Netherlands	0	1	0	1
13	East Germany	0	0	2	2
13	Sweden	0	0	2	2
15	Hungary	0	0	1	1
Totals (15 entries)		22	22	22	66

=== 4 × 200 metre freestyle relay ===
Year	Gold	Silver	Bronze
1973 Belgrade	United States (USA); Kurt Krumpholz; Robin Backhaus; Richard Klatt; Jim Montgomery; Melvin Nash*; Tim Shaw*; Bill Miller*; Rex Favero*	Australia (AUS); John Kulasalu; Steve Badger; Brad Cooper; Michael Wenden	West Germany (FRG); Klaus Steinbach; Werner Lampe; Peter Nocke; Folkert Meeuw; Gerhard Schiller*
1975 Cali	West Germany (FRG); Klaus Steinbach; Werner Lampe; Hans-Joachim Geisler; Peter Nocke; Folkert Meeuw*	Great Britain (GBR); Alan McClatchey; Gary Jameson; Gordon Downie; Brian Brinkley	Soviet Union (URS); Alexandre Samsonov; Anatoly Rybakov; Viktor Aboimov; Andrey Krylov; Vladimir Mikheyev*; Andrey Bogdanov*
1978 West Berlin	United States (USA); Bruce Furniss; Bill Forrester; Bobby Hackett; Rowdy Gaines; David Larson*; David Dickson*; Mark Greenwood*; Jim Montgomery*	Soviet Union (URS); Sergey Rusin; Andrey Krylov; Vladimir Salnikov; Sergey Koplyakov; Sergey Krasyuk*; Ivar Stukolkin*	West Germany (FRG); Andreas Schmidt; Peter Knust; Karsten Lippmann; Frank Wennmann
1982 Guayaquil	United States (USA); Richard Saeger; Jeff Float; Kyle Miller; Rowdy Gaines; Doug Towne*; Sam Worden*	Soviet Union (URS); Vladimir Shemetov; Ivar Stukolkin; Vladimir Salnikov; Alexey Filonov; Sergey Krasyuk*; Svyatoslav Semenov*; Andrey Krylov*	West Germany (FRG); Andreas Schmidt; Dirk Korthals; Rainer Henkel; Michael Gross; Peter Knust*
1986 Madrid	East Germany (GDR); Lars Hinnenburg; Thomas Flemming; Dirk Richter; Sven Lodziewski; Steffen Zesner*	West Germany (FRG); Rainer Henkel; Michael Gross; Alexander Schowtka; Thomas Fahrner; Dirk Korthals*; Stefan Pfeiffer*	United States (USA); Eric Boyer; Mike Heath; Dan Jorgensen; Matt Biondi; Mike O'Brien*
1991 Perth	Germany (GER); Peter Sitt; Steffen Zesner; Stefan Pfeiffer; Michael Gross; Jochen Bruha*; Christian Tröger*	United States (USA); Troy Dalbey; Melvin Stewart; Dan Jorgensen; Doug Gjertsen; Paul Robinson*	Italy (ITA); Emanuele Idini; Roberto Gleria; Stefano Battistelli; Giorgio Lamberti; Bruno Zorzan*
1994 Rome	Sweden (SWE); Christer Wallin; Tommy Werner; Lars Frölander; Anders Holmertz; Christoffer Eliasson*	Russia (RUS); Yury Mukhin; Vladimir Pyshnenko; Denis Pankratov; Roman Shchegolev; Alexei Stepanov*	Germany (GER); Andreas Szigat; Christian Keller; Oliver Lampe; Steffen Zesner; Dirk Bludau*; Christian Tröger*; Torsten Spanneberg*
1998 Perth	Australia (AUS); Michael Klim; Ian Thorpe; Grant Hackett; Daniel Kowalski; Anthony Rogis*	Netherlands (NED); Pieter van den Hoogenband; Martijn Zuijdweg; Mark van der Zijden; Marcel Wouda; Bas-Ido Wennekes*; Johan Kenkhuis*	Great Britain (GBR); Paul Palmer; Andrew Clayton; Gavin Meadows; James Salter; Mark Steven*
2001 Fukuoka	Australia (AUS); Grant Hackett; William Kirby; Michael Klim; Ian Thorpe; Todd Pearson*; Antony Matkovich*; Ray Hass*	Italy (ITA); Emiliano Brembilla; Matteo Pelliciari; Andrea Beccari; Massimiliano Rosolino; Federico Cappellazzo*; Andrea Righi*; Simone Cercato*	United States (USA); Scott Goldblatt; Nate Dusing; Chad Carvin; Klete Keller; Jay Schryver*; Jamie Rauch*
2003 Barcelona	Australia (AUS); Grant Hackett; Craig Stevens; Nicholas Sprenger; Ian Thorpe; Antony Matkovich*; Jason Cram*	United States (USA); Michael Phelps; Nate Dusing; Aaron Peirsol; Klete Keller; Scott Goldblatt*; Chad Carvin*; Kevin Clements*	Germany (GER); Johannes Oesterling; Lars Conrad; Stefan Herbst; Christian Keller; Helge Meeuw*
2005 Montreal	United States (USA); Michael Phelps; Ryan Lochte; Peter Vanderkaay; Klete Keller; Jayme Cramer*; Matthew McGinnis*	Canada (CAN); Brent Hayden; Colin Russell; Rick Say; Andrew Hurd	Australia (AUS); Nicholas Sprenger; Patrick Murphy; Andrew Mewing; Grant Hackett; Brendon Hughes*; Adam Lucas*
2007 Melbourne	United States (USA); Michael Phelps; Ryan Lochte; Klete Keller; Peter Vanderkaay; Jayme Cramer*; David Walters*	Australia (AUS); Patrick Murphy; Andrew Mewing; Grant Brits; Kenrick Monk; Nick Ffrost*	Canada (CAN); Brian Johns; Brent Hayden; Rick Say; Andrew Hurd
2009 Rome	United States (USA); Michael Phelps; Ricky Berens; David Walters; Ryan Lochte; Daniel Madwed*; Davis Tarwater*; Peter Vanderkaay*	Russia (RUS); Nikita Lobintsev; Mikhail Polischuk; Danila Izotov; Alexander Sukhorukov; Yevgeny Lagunov*; Sergey Perunin*	Australia (AUS); Kenrick Monk; Robert Hurley; Tommaso D'Orsogna; Patrick Murphy; Nick Ffrost*; Kirk Palmer*
2011 Shanghai	United States (USA); Michael Phelps; Peter Vanderkaay; Ricky Berens; Ryan Lochte; David Walters*; Conor Dwyer*	France (FRA); Yannick Agnel; Grégory Mallet; Jérémy Stravius; Fabien Gilot; Sébastien Rouault*	China (CHN); Wang Shun; Zhang Lin; Li Yunqi; Sun Yang; Jiang Yuhui*
2013 Barcelona	United States (USA); Conor Dwyer; Ryan Lochte (5); Charlie Houchin; Ricky Berens; Matt McLean*; Michael Klueh*	Russia (RUS); Danila Izotov; Nikita Lobintsev; Artem Lobuzov; Alexander Sukhorukov	China (CHN); Wang Shun; Hao Yun; Li Yunqi; Sun Yang; Lü Zhiwu*
2015 Kazan	Great Britain (GBR); Daniel Wallace; Robert Renwick; Calum Jarvis; James Guy; Nicholas Grainger*; Duncan Scott*	United States (USA); Ryan Lochte; Conor Dwyer; Reed Malone; Michael Weiss; Michael Klueh*	Australia (AUS); Cameron McEvoy; David McKeon; Daniel Smith; Thomas Fraser-Holmes; Grant Hackett*; Kurt Herzog*
2017 Budapest	Great Britain (GBR); Stephen Milne; Nicholas Grainger; Duncan Scott; James Guy; Calum Jarvis*	Russia (RUS); Mikhail Dovgalyuk; Mikhail Vekovishchev; Danila Izotov; Aleksandr Krasnykh; Nikita Lobintsev*	United States (USA); Blake Pieroni; Townley Haas; Jack Conger; Zane Grothe; Conor Dwyer*; Clark Smith*; Jay Litherland*
2019 Gwangju	Australia (AUS); Clyde Lewis; Kyle Chalmers; Alexander Graham; Mack Horton; Jack McLoughlin*; Thomas Fraser-Holmes*	Russia (RUS); Mikhail Dovgalyuk; Mikhail Vekovishchev; Aleksandr Krasnykh; Martin Malyutin; Ivan Giryov*	United States (USA); Andrew Seliskar; Blake Pieroni; Zach Apple; Townley Haas; Jack Conger*; Jack LeVant*
2022 Budapest	United States (USA); Drew Kibler; Carson Foster; Trenton Julian; Kieran Smith; Trey Freeman*; Coby Carrozza*	Australia (AUS); Elijah Winnington; Zac Incerti; Samuel Short; Mack Horton; Brendon Smith*	Great Britain (GBR); James Guy; Jacob Whittle; Joe Litchfield; Tom Dean; Matthew Richards*
2023 Fukuoka	Great Britain (GBR); Duncan Scott; Matthew Richards; James Guy; Tom Dean; Joe Litchfield*	United States (USA); Luke Hobson; Carson Foster; Jake Mitchell; Kieran Smith; Drew Kibler*; Baylor Nelson*; Henry McFadden*	Australia (AUS); Kai Taylor; Kyle Chalmers; Alexander Graham; Thomas Neill; Flynn Southam*; Elijah Winnington*
2024 Doha	China (CHN); Ji Xinjie; Wang Haoyu; Pan Zhanle; Zhang Zhanshuo	South Korea (KOR); Yang Jae-hoon; Kim Woo-min; Lee Ho-joon; Hwang Sun-woo; Lee Yoo-yeon*	United States (USA); Luke Hobson; Carson Foster; Hunter Armstrong; David Johnston; Shaine Casas*
2025 Singapore	Great Britain (GBR); Matthew Richards; James Guy; Jack McMillan; Duncan Scott; Evan Jones*; Tom Dean*	China (CHN); Ji Xinjie; Pan Zhanle; Wang Shun; Zhang Zhanshuo; Fei Liwei*	Australia (AUS); Flynn Southam; Charlie Hawke; Kai Taylor; Maximillian Giuliani; Edward Sommerville*

* Swimmers who participated in the heats only.

Medal table

Rank	Nation	Gold	Silver	Bronze	Total
1	United States	9	4	5	18
2	Australia	4	3	5	12
3	Great Britain	4	1	2	7
4	West Germany	1	1	3	5
5	China	1	1	2	4
6	Germany	1	0	2	3
7	East Germany	1	0	0	1
7	Sweden	1	0	0	1
9	Russia	0	5	0	5
10	Soviet Union	0	2	1	3
11	Canada	0	1	1	2
11	Italy	0	1	1	2
13	France	0	1	0	1
13	Netherlands	0	1	0	1
13	South Korea	0	1	0	1
Totals (15 entries)		22	22	22	66

=== 4 × 100 metre medley relay ===
Year	Gold	Silver	Bronze
1973 Belgrade	United States (USA); Mike Stamm; John Hencken; Joe Bottom; Jim Montgomery; John Naber*; Robin Backhaus*; Melvin Nash*	East Germany (GDR); Roland Matthes; Jürgen Glas; Hartmut Flöckner; Roger Pyttel; Lutz Wanja*; Wilfried Hartung*	Canada (CAN); Ian McKenzie; Peter Hrditschka; Bruce Robertson; Brian Phillips
1975 Cali	United States (USA); John Murphy; Rick Colella; Gregory Jagenburg; Andy Coan; Melvin Nash*; Rick Bohan*; Bill Forrester*; Joe Bottom*	West Germany (FRG); Klaus Steinbach; Walter Kusch; Michael Kraus; Peter Nocke; Bodo Schlag*; Peter Lang*; Lutz Stoklasa*; Dirk Braunleder*	Great Britain (GBR); James Carter; David Wilkie; Brian Brinkley; Gordon Downie; Stephen Nash*
1978 West Berlin	United States (USA); Bob Jackson; Nicholas Nevid; Joe Bottom; David McCagg; Peter Rocca*; Steve Lundquist*; Gregory Jagenburg*; Rowdy Gaines*	West Germany (FRG); Klaus Steinbach; Walter Kusch; Michael Kraus; Andreas Schmidt; Reinhold Becker*; Peter Broscienski*; Ulrich Temps*	Great Britain (GBR); Gary Abraham; Duncan Goodhew; John Mills; Martin Smith; David Dunne*
1982 Guayaquil	United States (USA); Rick Carey; Steve Lundquist; Matt Gribble; Rowdy Gaines; Clay Britt*; John Moffet*; Chris Rives*; Chris Cavanaugh*	Soviet Union (URS); Vladimir Shemetov; Yuri Kis; Aleksey Markovsky; Sergey Smiryagin; Viktor Kuznetsov*; Sergey Krasyuk*	West Germany (FRG); Stefan Peter; Gerald Mörken; Michael Gross; Andreas Schmidt
1986 Madrid	United States (USA); Dan Veatch; David Lundberg; Pablo Morales; Matt Biondi; Mark Rhodenbaugh*; Steven Bentley*; Craig Oppel*; Tom Jager*	West Germany (FRG); Frank Hoffmeister; Bert Göbel; Michael Gross; Andre Schadt; Rene Schaffgans*; Alexander Schowtka*	Soviet Union (URS); Igor Polyansky; Dmitry Volkov; Aleksey Markovsky; Nikolay Yevseyev; Sergei Zabolotnov*; Eduard Klimentyev*; Sergey Garro*; Sergey Smiryagin*
1991 Perth	United States (USA); Jeff Rouse; Eric Wunderlich; Mark Henderson; Matt Biondi; Scot Johnson*; Mike Barrowman*; Bart Pippenger*; Brent Lang*	Soviet Union (URS); Vladimir Shemetov; Dmitry Volkov; Vladislav Kulikov; Veniamin Tayanovich; Vladimir Selkov*; Vadim Alekseyev*; Vyacheslav Novikov*; Yuri Bashkatov*	Germany (GER); Frank Hoffmeister; Christian Poswiat; Michael Gross; Dirk Richter; Thilo Haase*; Bengt Zikarsky*
1994 Rome	United States (USA); Jeff Rouse; Eric Wunderlich; Mark Henderson; Gary Hall, Jr. Brian Retterer*; Seth Van Neerden*; Jon Olsen*	Russia (RUS); Vladimir Selkov; Vasily Ivanov; Denis Pankratov; Alexander Popov; Andrey Ivanov*; Vladislav Kulikov*; Vladimir Predkin*	Hungary (HUN); Tamás Deutsch; Norbert Rózsa; Péter Horváth; Attila Czene; Attila Zubor*
1998 Perth	Australia (AUS); Matt Welsh; Phil Rogers; Michael Klim; Chris Fydler; Geoff Huegill*	United States (USA); Lenny Krayzelburg; Kurt Grote; Neil Walker; Gary Hall, Jr. Jeremy Linn*; John Hargis*; Scott Tucker*	Hungary (HUN); Attila Czene; Norbert Rózsa; Péter Horváth; Attila Zubor
2001 Fukuoka	Australia (AUS); Matt Welsh; Regan Harrison; Geoff Huegill; Ian Thorpe; Josh Watson*; Phil Rogers*; Adam Pine*; Ashley Callus*	Germany (GER); Steffen Driesen; Jens Kruppa; Thomas Rupprath; Torsten Spanneberg	Russia (RUS); Vladislav Aminov; Dmitry Komornikov; Vladislav Kulikov; Dmitry Chernyshov; Igor Marchenko*; Leonid Khokhlov*
2003 Barcelona	United States (USA); Aaron Peirsol; Brendan Hansen; Ian Crocker; Jason Lezak; Randall Bal*; Ed Moses*; Michael Phelps*; Neil Walker*	Russia (RUS); Arkady Vyatchanin; Roman Ivanovsky; Igor Marchenko; Alexander Popov; Yevgeny Aleshin*; Dmitry Komornikov*; Yevgeny Korotyshkin*; Denis Pimankov*	Japan (JPN); Tomomi Morita; Kosuke Kitajima; Takashi Yamamoto; Daisuke Hosokawa
2005 Montreal	United States (USA); Aaron Peirsol; Brendan Hansen; Ian Crocker; Jason Lezak; Randall Bal*; Mark Gangloff*; Michael Phelps*; Neil Walker*	Russia (RUS); Arkady Vyatchanin; Dmitry Komornikov; Igor Marchenko; Andrey Kapralov; Grigory Falko*; Yevgeny Korotyshkin*; Yevgeny Lagunov*	Japan (JPN); Tomomi Morita; Kosuke Kitajima; Ryo Takayasu; Daisuke Hosokawa; Hisayoshi Sato*
2007 Melbourne	Australia (AUS); Matt Welsh; Brenton Rickard; Andrew Lauterstein; Eamon Sullivan; Hayden Stoeckel*; Michael Klim*; Kenrick Monk*	Japan (JPN); Tomomi Morita; Kosuke Kitajima; Takashi Yamamoto; Daisuke Hosokawa; Masafumi Yamaguchi*	Russia (RUS); Arkady Vyatchanin; Dmitry Komornikov; Nikolay Skvortsov; Yevgeny Lagunov; Roman Sludnov*; Andrey Kapralov*
2009 Rome	United States (USA); Aaron Peirsol; Eric Shanteau; Michael Phelps; David Walters; Matt Grevers*; Mark Gangloff*; Tyler McGill*; Nathan Adrian*	Germany (GER); Helge Meeuw; Hendrik Feldwehr; Benjamin Starke; Paul Biedermann	Australia (AUS); Ashley Delaney; Brenton Rickard; Andrew Lauterstein; Matt Targett; Christian Sprenger*
2011 Shanghai	United States (USA); Nick Thoman; Mark Gangloff; Michael Phelps; Nathan Adrian; David Plummer*; Eric Shanteau*; Tyler McGill*; Garrett Weber-Gale*	Australia (AUS); Hayden Stoeckel; Brenton Rickard; Geoff Huegill; James Magnussen; Ben Treffers*; Christian Sprenger*; Sam Ashby*; James Roberts*	Germany (GER); Helge Meeuw; Hendrik Feldwehr; Benjamin Starke; Paul Biedermann; Markus Deibler*
2013 Barcelona	France (FRA); Camille Lacourt; Giacomo Perez d'Ortona; Jérémy Stravius; Fabien Gilot	Australia (AUS); Ashley Delaney; Christian Sprenger; Tommaso D'Orsogna; James Magnussen; Kenneth To*; Cameron McEvoy*	Japan (JPN); Ryosuke Irie; Kosuke Kitajima; Takuro Fujii; Shinri Shioura
2015 Kazan	United States (USA); Ryan Murphy; Kevin Cordes; Tom Shields; Nathan Adrian; Matt Grevers*; Cody Miller*; Tim Phillips*; Ryan Lochte*	Australia (AUS); Mitch Larkin; Jake Packard; Jayden Hadler; Cameron McEvoy; David Morgan*; Kyle Chalmers*	France (FRA); Camille Lacourt; Giacomo Perez-Dortona; Mehdy Metella; Fabien Gilot
2017 Budapest	United States (USA); Matt Grevers; Kevin Cordes; Caeleb Dressel; Nathan Adrian; Ryan Murphy*; Cody Miller*; Tim Phillips*; Townley Haas*	Great Britain (GBR); Chris Walker-Hebborn; Adam Peaty; James Guy; Duncan Scott; Ross Murdoch*	Russia (RUS); Evgeny Rylov; Kirill Prigoda; Aleksandr Popkov; Vladimir Morozov; Grigoriy Tarasevich*; Anton Chupkov*; Daniil Pakhomov*; Danila Izotov*
2019 Gwangju	Great Britain (GBR); Luke Greenbank; Adam Peaty; James Guy; Duncan Scott; James Wilby*	United States (USA); Ryan Murphy; Andrew Wilson; Caeleb Dressel; Nathan Adrian; Matt Grevers*; Michael Andrew*; Jack Conger*; Zach Apple*	Russia (RUS); Evgeny Rylov; Kirill Prigoda; Andrey Minakov; Vladimir Morozov; Kliment Kolesnikov*; Anton Chupkov*; Mikhail Vekovishchev*; Vladislav Grinev*
2022 Budapest	Italy (ITA); Thomas Ceccon; Nicolò Martinenghi; Federico Burdisso; Alessandro Miressi; Piero Codia*; Lorenzo Zazzeri*	United States (USA); Ryan Murphy; Nic Fink; Michael Andrew; Ryan Held; Hunter Armstrong*; Trenton Julian*; Brooks Curry*	Great Britain (GBR); Luke Greenbank; James Wilby; James Guy; Tom Dean; Jacob Peters*; Lewis Burras*
2023 Fukuoka	United States (USA); Ryan Murphy; Nic Fink; Dare Rose; Jack Alexy; Hunter Armstrong*; Josh Matheny*; Thomas Heilman*; Matt King*	China (CHN); Xu Jiayu; Qin Haiyang; Wang Changhao; Pan Zhanle; Yan Zibei*; Sun Jiajun*; Wang Haoyu*	Australia (AUS); Bradley Woodward; Zac Stubblety-Cook; Matthew Temple; Kyle Chalmers; Samuel Williamson*; Kai Taylor*
2024 Doha	United States (USA); Hunter Armstrong; Nic Fink; Zach Harting; Matt King; Jack Aikins*; Jake Foster*; Shaine Casas*; Luke Hobson*	Netherlands (NED); Kai van Westering; Arno Kamminga; Nyls Korstanje; Stan Pijnenburg; Caspar Corbeau*	Italy (ITA); Michele Lamberti; Nicolò Martinenghi; Gianmarco Sansone; Alessandro Miressi; Ludovico Viberti*; Federico Burdisso*
2025 Singapore	Neutral Athletes B (NAB); Miron Lifintsev; Kirill Prigoda; Andrey Minakov; Egor Kornev; Kliment Kolesnikov*; Ivan Kozhakin*; Ivan Giryov*	France (FRA); Yohann Ndoye-Brouard; Léon Marchand; Maxime Grousset; Yann Le Goff; Jérémie Delbois*; Clément Secchi*	United States (USA); Tommy Janton; Josh Matheny; Dare Rose; Jack Alexy; Campbell McKean*

* Swimmers who participated in the heats only.

Medal table

Rank	Nation	Gold	Silver	Bronze	Total
1	United States	15	3	1	19
2	Australia	3	3	2	8
3	Great Britain	1	1	3	5
4	France	1	1	1	3
5	Italy	1	0	1	2
6	Neutral Athletes B	1	0	0	1
7	Russia	0	3	4	7
8	West Germany	0	3	1	4
9	Germany	0	2	2	4
10	Soviet Union	0	2	1	3
11	Japan	0	1	3	4
12	China	0	1	0	1
12	East Germany	0	1	0	1
12	Netherlands	0	1	0	1
15	Hungary	0	0	2	2
16	Canada	0	0	1	1
Totals (16 entries)		22	22	22	66

=== 4 × 100 metre mixed freestyle relay ===
Year	Gold	Silver	Bronze
2015 Kazan	United States (USA); Ryan Lochte; Nathan Adrian; Simone Manuel; Missy Franklin; Conor Dwyer*; Margo Geer*; Abbey Weitzeil*	Netherlands (NED); Sebastiaan Verschuren; Joost Reijns; Ranomi Kromowidjojo; Femke Heemskerk; Kyle Stolk*; Marrit Steenbergen*	Canada (CAN); Santo Condorelli; Yuri Kisil; Chantal Van Landeghem; Sandrine Mainville; Karl Krug*; Victoria Poon*
2017 Budapest	United States (USA); Caeleb Dressel; Nathan Adrian; Mallory Comerford; Simone Manuel; Blake Pieroni*; Townley Haas*; Lia Neal*; Kelsi Worrell*	Netherlands (NED); Ben Schwietert; Kyle Stolk; Femke Heemskerk; Ranomi Kromowidjojo; Maud van der Meer*	Canada (CAN); Yuri Kisil; Javier Acevedo; Chantal Van Landeghem; Penny Oleksiak; Markus Thormeyer*; Sandrine Mainville*
2019 Gwangju	United States (USA); Caeleb Dressel; Zach Apple; Mallory Comerford; Simone Manuel; Blake Pieroni*; Nathan Adrian*; Katie McLaughlin*; Abbey Weitzeil*	Australia (AUS); Kyle Chalmers; Clyde Lewis; Emma McKeon; Bronte Campbell; Cameron McEvoy*; Alexander Graham*; Brianna Throssell*; Madison Wilson*	France (FRA); Clément Mignon; Mehdy Metella; Charlotte Bonnet; Marie Wattel; Maxime Grousset*; Béryl Gastaldello*
2022 Budapest	Australia (AUS); Jack Cartwright; Kyle Chalmers; Madison Wilson; Mollie O'Callaghan; Zac Incerti*; William Yang*; Meg Harris*; Leah Neale*	Canada (CAN); Joshua Liendo; Javier Acevedo; Kayla Sanchez; Penny Oleksiak; Ruslan Gaziev*; Taylor Ruck*; Maggie Mac Neil*	United States (USA); Ryan Held; Brooks Curry; Torri Huske; Claire Curzan; Drew Kibler*; Erika Brown*; Kate Douglass*
2023 Fukuoka	Australia (AUS); Jack Cartwright; Kyle Chalmers; Shayna Jack; Mollie O'Callaghan; Flynn Southam*; Madison Wilson*; Meg Harris*	United States (USA); Jack Alexy; Matt King; Abbey Weitzeil; Kate Douglass; Chris Guiliano*; Olivia Smoliga*; Bella Sims*	Great Britain (GBR); Matthew Richards; Duncan Scott; Anna Hopkin; Freya Anderson; Jacob Whittle*; Tom Dean*; Lucy Hope*
2024 Doha	China (CHN); Pan Zhanle; Wang Haoyu; Li Bingjie; Yu Yiting; Ji Xinjie*; Ai Yanhan*	Australia (AUS); Kai Taylor; Jack Cartwright; Shayna Jack; Brianna Throssell; Alexandria Perkins*; Abbey Harkin*	United States (USA); Hunter Armstrong; Matt King; Claire Curzan; Kate Douglass; Luke Hobson*; Jack Aikins*; Addison Sauickie*; Kayla Han*
2025 Singapore	United States (USA); Jack Alexy; Patrick Sammon; Kate Douglass; Torri Huske; Chris Guiliano*; Jonny Kulow*; Simone Manuel* (3+1*)	Neutral Athletes B (NAB); Egor Kornev; Ivan Giryov; Daria Trofimova; Daria Klepikova; Vladislav Grinev*; Alina Gaifutdinova*; Milana Stepanova*	France (FRA); Maxime Grousset; Yann Le Goff; Marie Wattel; Béryl Gastaldello; Rafael Fente-Damers*; Albane Cachot*

* Swimmers who participated in the heats only.

Medal table

Rank	Nation	Gold	Silver	Bronze	Total
1	United States	4	1	2	7
2	Australia	2	2	0	4
3	China	1	0	0	1
4	Netherlands	0	2	0	2
5	Canada	0	1	2	3
6	Neutral Athletes B	0	1	0	1
7	France	0	0	2	2
8	Great Britain	0	0	1	1
Totals (8 entries)		7	7	7	21

=== 4 × 100 metre mixed medley relay ===
Year	Gold	Silver	Bronze
2015 Kazan	Great Britain (GBR); Chris Walker-Hebborn; Adam Peaty; Siobhan-Marie O'Connor; Fran Halsall; Ross Murdoch*; Rachael Kelly*	United States (USA); Ryan Murphy; Kevin Cordes; Katie McLaughlin; Margo Geer; Kendyl Stewart*; Lia Neal*	Germany (GER); Jan-Philip Glania; Hendrik Feldwehr; Alexandra Wenk; Annika Bruhn
2017 Budapest	United States (USA); Matt Grevers; Lilly King; Caeleb Dressel; Simone Manuel; Ryan Murphy*; Kevin Cordes*; Kelsi Worrell*; Mallory Comerford*	Australia (AUS); Mitch Larkin; Daniel Cave; Emma McKeon; Bronte Campbell; Kaylee McKeown*; Matthew Wilson*; Grant Irvine*; Shayna Jack*	Canada (CAN); Kylie Masse; Richard Funk; Penny Oleksiak; Yuri Kisil; Javier Acevedo*; Rebecca Smith*; Chantal Van Landeghem*
2017 Budapest	United States (USA); Matt Grevers; Lilly King; Caeleb Dressel; Simone Manuel; Ryan Murphy*; Kevin Cordes*; Kelsi Worrell*; Mallory Comerford*	Australia (AUS); Mitch Larkin; Daniel Cave; Emma McKeon; Bronte Campbell; Kaylee McKeown*; Matthew Wilson*; Grant Irvine*; Shayna Jack*	China (CHN); Xu Jiayu; Yan Zibei; Zhang Yufei; Zhu Menghui; Li Guangyuan*; Shi Jinglin*; Li Zhuhao*
2019 Gwangju	Australia (AUS); Mitch Larkin; Matthew Wilson; Emma McKeon; Cate Campbell; Minna Atherton*; Matthew Temple*; Bronte Campbell*	United States (USA); Ryan Murphy; Lilly King; Caeleb Dressel; Simone Manuel; Matt Grevers*; Andrew Wilson*; Kelsi Dahlia*; Mallory Comerford*	Great Britain (GBR); Georgia Davies; Adam Peaty; James Guy; Freya Anderson; James Wilby*
2022 Budapest	United States (USA); Hunter Armstrong; Nic Fink; Torri Huske; Claire Curzan; Ryan Murphy*; Lilly King*; Michael Andrew*; Erika Brown*	Australia (AUS); Kaylee McKeown; Zac Stubblety-Cook; Matthew Temple; Shayna Jack; Isaac Cooper*; Matthew Wilson*; Brianna Throssell*; Meg Harris*	Netherlands (NED); Kira Toussaint; Arno Kamminga; Nyls Korstanje; Marrit Steenbergen
2023 Fukuoka	China (CHN); Xu Jiayu; Qin Haiyang; Zhang Yufei; Cheng Yujie; Yan Zibei*; Wang Yichun*; Wu Qingfeng*	Australia (AUS); Kaylee McKeown; Zac Stubblety-Cook; Matthew Temple; Shayna Jack; Bradley Woodward*; Samuel Williamson*; Emma McKeon*	United States (USA); Ryan Murphy; Nic Fink; Torri Huske; Kate Douglass; Katharine Berkoff*; Josh Matheny*; Dare Rose*; Abbey Weitzeil*
2024 Doha	United States (USA); Hunter Armstrong (2); Nic Fink (2); Claire Curzan (2); Kate Douglass; Jack Aikins*; Jake Foster*; Rachel Klinker*; Addison Sauickie*	Australia (AUS); Bradley Woodward; Samuel Williamson; Brianna Throssell; Shayna Jack; Alexandria Perkins*; Abbey Harkin*	Great Britain (GBR); Medi Harris; Adam Peaty; Matthew Richards; Anna Hopkin; James Wilby*; Duncan Scott*
2025 Singapore	Neutral Athletes B (NAB); Miron Lifintsev; Kirill Prigoda; Daria Klepikova; Daria Trofimova; Danil Semianinov*; Alexandra Kuznetsova*	China (CHN); Xu Jiayu; Qin Haiyang; Zhang Yufei; Wu Qingfeng; Dong Zhihao*; Yu Yiting*; Cheng Yujie*	Canada (CAN); Kylie Masse; Oliver Dawson; Joshua Liendo; Taylor Ruck; Ingrid Wilm*; Brooklyn Douthwright*

* Swimmers who participated in the heats only.

Medal table

Rank	Nation	Gold	Silver	Bronze	Total
1	United States	3	2	1	6
2	Australia	1	4	0	5
3	China	1	1	1	3
4	Great Britain	1	0	2	3
5	Neutral Athletes B	1	0	0	1
6	Canada	0	0	2	2
7	Germany	0	0	1	1
7	Netherlands	0	0	1	1
Totals (8 entries)		7	7	8	22

== All-time medal table 1973–2025 ==
Updated after the 2025 World Aquatics Championships.

=== Men's events ===
Rank	Nation	Gold	Silver	Bronze	Total
1	United States	136	109	71	316
2	Australia	46	39	31	116
3	China	24	6	13	43
4	Hungary	22	13	21	56
5	France	21	16	20	57
6	Great Britain	21	13	31	65
7	Italy	15	25	23	63
8	Russia	13	22	21	56
9	South Africa	12	7	15	34
10	Germany	10	17	19	46
11	Japan	9	22	22	53
12	Brazil	8	10	10	28
13	West Germany	8	7	9	24
14	Soviet Union	7	17	15	39
15	Canada	6	15	12	33
16	East Germany	6	8	10	24
17	Tunisia	5	3	3	11
18	Poland	4	8	9	21
19	Ukraine	4	4	6	14
20	South Korea	4	2	3	9
21	Romania	4	0	1	5
22	Sweden	3	6	9	18
23	Spain	3	2	4	9
24	Finland	2	2	1	5
24	Neutral Athletes B	2	2	1	5
26	Portugal	2	1	0	3
27	Ireland	2	0	0	2
28	Netherlands	1	13	3	17
29	New Zealand	1	3	3	7
30	Greece	1	1	1	3
31	Norway	1	1	0	2
31	Serbia	1	1	0	2
33	Belgium	1	0	1	2
34	Suriname	1	0	0	1
35	Switzerland	0	5	1	6
36	Austria	0	4	2	6
37	Croatia	0	2	0	2
38	Lithuania	0	1	2	3
39	Iceland	0	1	1	2
39	Yugoslavia	0	1	1	2
41	Denmark	0	0	2	2
41	Singapore	0	0	2	2
43	Argentina	0	0	1	1
43	Kyrgyzstan	0	0	1	1
43	Puerto Rico	0	0	1	1
43	Trinidad and Tobago	0	0	1	1
43	Venezuela	0	0	1	1
Totals (47 entries)		406	409	404	1,219

=== Mixed events ===
Rank	Nation	Gold	Silver	Bronze	Total
1	United States	7	3	3	13
2	Australia	3	6	0	9
3	China	2	1	1	4
4	Neutral Athletes B	1	1	0	2
5	Great Britain	1	0	3	4
6	Netherlands	0	2	1	3
7	Canada	0	1	4	5
8	France	0	0	2	2
9	Germany	0	0	1	1
Totals (9 entries)		14	14	15	43

== Multiple medalists ==
Boldface denotes active swimmers and highest medal count among all swimmers (including these who not included in these tables) per type.

=== All events ===
Rank	Swimmer	Country	From	To	Gold	Silver	Bronze	Total
1	Michael Phelps	United States	2001	2011	26 **	6	1	33 **
2	Ryan Lochte	United States	2005	2015	18 *	5	4 *	27 **
3	**Caeleb Dressel**	United States	2017	2022	15	2	–	17
4	**Sun Yang**	China	2009	2019	11	2	3	16
5	Ian Thorpe	Australia	1998	2003	11	1	1	13
6	Grant Hackett	Australia	1998	2015	10	6	3 *	19 *
7	Nathan Adrian	United States	2009	2019	10 **	4	2	16 **
8	Aaron Peirsol	United States	2001	2009	10	2	–	12
9	**Adam Peaty**	Great Britain	2015	2024	8	1	3	12
10	**Ryan Murphy**	United States	2015	2023	7 ***	**8**	2	17 ***

* including one medal in the relay event in which he participated in the heats only
** including two medals in the relay events in which he participated in the heats only
*** including three medals in the relay events in which he participated in the heats only

=== Individual events ===
Rank	Swimmer	Country	From	To	Gold	Silver	Bronze	Total
1	Michael Phelps	United States	2001	2011	**15**	5	–	**20**
2	**Sun Yang**	China	2009	2019	11	2	1	14
3	Ryan Lochte	United States	2005	2015	10	3	3	16
4	**Caeleb Dressel**	United States	2017	2022	8	–	–	8
5	Grant Hackett	Australia	1998	2007	7	**6**	1	14
6	**Léon Marchand**	France	2022	2025	7	1	–	8
6	Aaron Peirsol	United States	2001	2009	7	1	–	8
8	Ian Thorpe	Australia	1998	2003	6	1	1	8
9	**Adam Peaty**	Great Britain	2015	2024	6	–	1	7
10	César Cielo	Brazil	2009	2013	6	–	–	6

== See also ==
- List of World Aquatics Championships medalists in swimming (women)
- List of World Aquatics Championships medalists in open water swimming
- List of individual gold medalists in swimming at the Olympics and World Aquatics Championships (men)
- List of gold medalist relay teams in swimming at the Olympics and World Aquatics Championships
- List of Olympic medalists in swimming (men)
