= Villaret =

Villaret is a surname. Notable people with the name include:

- Louis Thomas Villaret de Joyeuse (1747–1812), French Navy officer and politician
- Étienne de Villaret (1854–1931), senior officer in the French army
- Foulques de Villaret (died 1327), 25th Grand Master of the Knights Hospitaller
- Guillaume de Villaret (1235–1305), 24th Grand Master of the Knights Hospitaller
- Henrique Villaret (born 1964), Portuguese swimmer
- João Villaret OSE (1913–1961), Portuguese actor
- Maurice Villaret (1877–1946), French neurologist

== See also ==
- Brousses-et-Villaret, commune in the Aude department in southern France
- Teatro Villaret, theatre in Lisbon, Portugal, founded in 1964
