= Vasco Sousa =

Vasco Sousa may refer to:

- Vasco Martins de Sousa (1320–1387), Portuguese nobleman
- Vasco Sousa (swimmer) (born 1964), Portuguese swimmer
- Vasco Sousa (footballer) (born 2003), Portuguese footballer
