= Lars Hinneburg =

East German swimmer

Medal record

Men's swimming

Representing East Germany

Olympic Games
Bronze medal – third place	1988 Seoul	4×100 m freestyle
Silver medal – second place	1988 Seoul	4×200 m freestyle

World Championships (LC)
Gold medal – first place	1986 Madrid	4×200 m freestyle

European Championships (LC)
Silver medal – second place	1985 Sofia	4×100 m freestyle
Silver medal – second place	1987 Strasbourg	4×200 m freestyle

Lars Hinneburg (born 15 June 1965 in Rostock, Mecklenburg-Vorpommern) is a former freestyle swimmer from East Germany, who competed for his native country at the 1988 Summer Olympics in Seoul, South Korea. There he won the bronze medal in the men's 4×100 m freestyle relay, together with Steffen Zesner, Thomas Flemming, and Dirk Richter.
