= Brent Lang =

American swimmer (born 1968)

Personal information
- Full name: Brent Dennis Lang
- National team: United States
- Born: January 25, 1968 (age 58) Phoenix, Arizona, U.S.
- Occupations: Business Manager, CEO
- Height: 6 ft 6 in (1.98 m)
- Weight: 186 lb (84 kg)
- Spouse: Beth Van Schaack

Sport
- Sport: Swimming
- Strokes: Freestyle
- Club: Tualatin Hills SC
- College team: University of Michigan (BS Engineering 1990); Stanford University MBA
- Coach: Jon Urbanchek (Michigan)
Medal record
Men's swimming
Representing the United States
Olympic Games
Gold medal – first place	1988 Seoul	4x100 m freestyle
World Championships (LC)
Gold medal – first place	1991 Perth	4×100 m freestyle
Pan Pacific Games
Gold medal – first place	1989 Tokyo	100 m freestyle
Gold medal – first place	1989 Tokyo	4×100 m freestyle
Summer Universiade
Gold medal – first place	1987 Zagreb	4x200 m freestyle

Brent Dennis Lang (born January 25, 1968) is an American former competition swimmer who competed for the University of Michigan and was an Olympic gold medalist at the 1988 Summer Olympics in Seoul, South Korea. In his business pursuits, he became a President and CEO of Vocera Healthcare in 2013.

Lang was born January 25, 1968, in Phoenix, Arizona but grew up in Portland, Oregon. One of his first swim coaches was Ty Steinbeck who also coached Oregonian Don Scholander, before he became a 5-time freestyle Olympic gold medalist.

When he was eleven, Lang's family moved to the English Channel's Island of Guernsey, where unable to make the soccer team or play the more American sports of basketball or baseball, Lang began to focus on swimming, winning the British National Age Group Championships at 13 in the 100 fly and 200 IM.

== High School swimming ==
By his late teens, Brent returned to Portland, Oregon, graduating Beaverton, Oregon's Sunset High School in 1986. As a youth in Beaverton, he swam for the Tualatin Hills Swim Club by the age of seven. Lang was an All American in High School, competing in all four strokes, and was particularly skilled in butterfly and IM. Despite his preference for butterfly, he placed sixth in the nation in the 100-yard backstroke at the 1986 Senior Nationals with a time of 50.94. His 50.94 was the second best 100-yard backstroke High School time in the nation among High School swimmers, and was second only to Jeff Rouse of Virginia who swam a 50.54.

In his Senior year in High School, he was granted an athletic scholarship to attend the University of Michigan sponsored by the Tektronix Foundation.

== 1988 Seoul Olympics ==
At the August, 1988 U.S. Olympic swimming trials in Austin, Texas, Lang was selected as an alternate.

At the 1988 Summer Olympics in Seoul, South Korea, Lang earned a gold medal by swimming the lead off leg for the U.S. team in the preliminary heats of the men's 4×100-meter freestyle relay. Later in the finals, the U.S. relay team won the event with a record time of 3:16.53, with Matt Biondi swimming the fastest leg as the anchor swimmer to secure the lead by nearly two seconds over the Russian team who took the Silver medal.

== University of Michigan ==
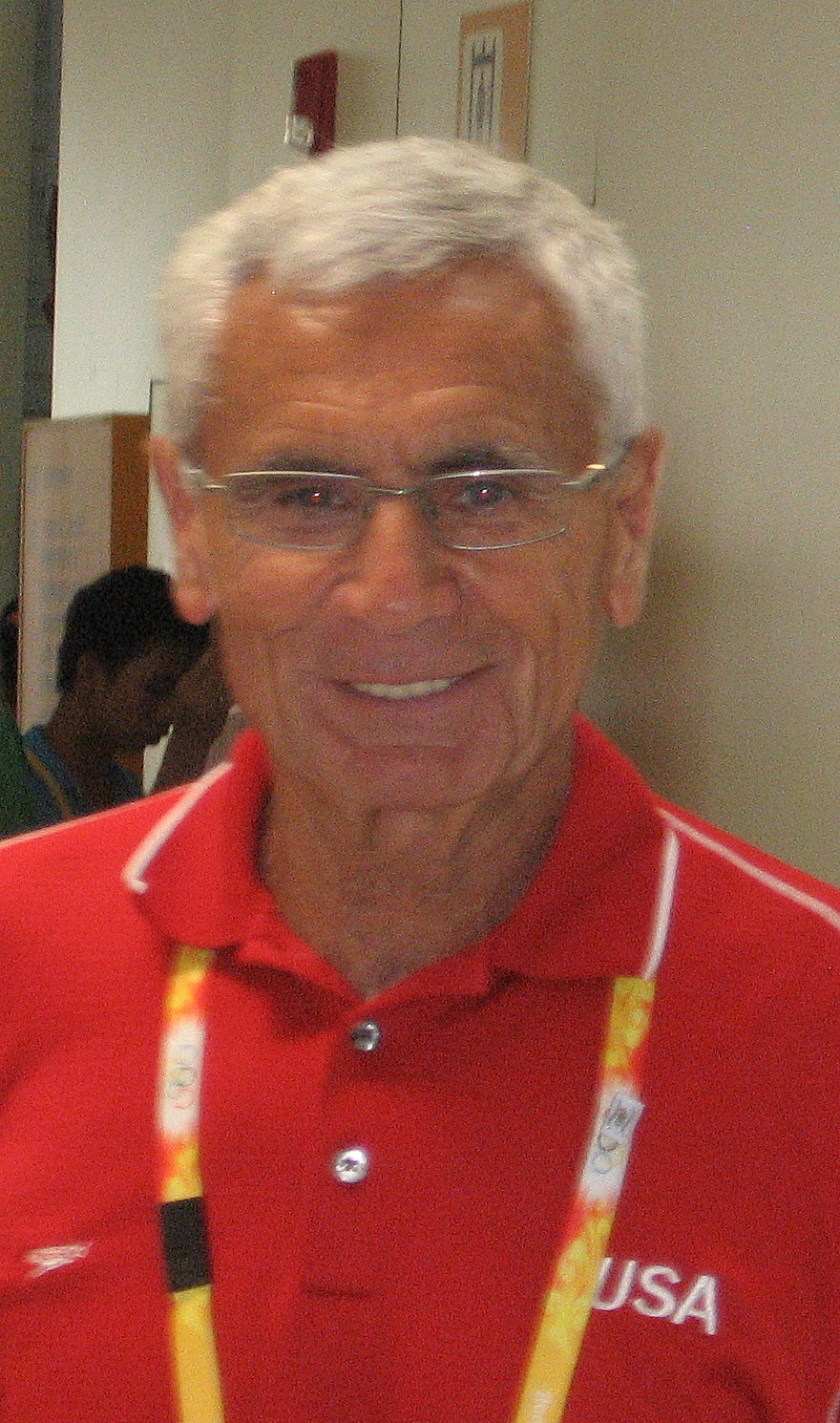
Coach J. Urbanchek

Beginning in the Fall of 1986, Lang began attending the University of Michigan where he was a member of the Michigan Wolverines swimming and diving team under Head Coach Jon Urbanchek, a Hungarian-born Hall of Fame honoree who had formerly competed in swimming for the University, and captured an NCAA Championship in the one mile freestyle event. Lang's Freshman class of swimmers had 15 exceptional recruits which added considerable depth to the growing Michigan team. In National Collegiate Athletic Association (NCAA) competition, Lang won four NCAA national championships as a Michigan swimmer—twice in the 50-yard freestyle (1989, 1990) and twice in the 100-yard freestyle (1988, 1990).

An exceptional scholar, Lang graduated Michigan with a degree in Industrial and Operations Engineering and earned summa cum laude honors. He was a 1990 finalist for the Rhodes Scholarship, and later earned a Master of Business Administration from Stanford. At Stanford, he was an Arjay Miller Scholar, awarded only to the highest 10% of the graduating MBA class.

=== International competition ===
In international competition, Lang captured a gold medal in the 100 freestyle and the 4x100 free at 1989 Pan Pacific Games in Tokyo. He was a 1991 World Champion in Perth, Australia in the 4x100 free relay. At the 1987 Universiade, he claimed a gold medal in the 4x200 freestyle relay.

=== Careers ===
Brent began his business career as a management consultant before earning his MBA from Stanford. After graduating, he immersed himself in the high-tech world of Silicon Valley and spent the next 27 years building and scaling technology companies. He spent nine years as CEO and board member of Vocera Communications (NYSE:VCRA), a leader in communication and workflow solutions for hospitals, until the company was acquired by Stryker in January 2022. Previously, he served as president and COO and helped lead the company’s successful IPO in 2012. Brent joined Vocera in 2001 as one of its earliest employees, serving as vice president of marketing.

Currently, Brent serves on the board of Outset Medical (NASDAQ:OM), a medical technology company developing hemodialysis systems for hospital and home use. He is also Chair of the Board at Eko Health, maker of digital stethoscopes that leverage AI to help clinicians deliver earlier, more accurate diagnoses of cardiac and pulmonary conditions.

Until December 2024, Brent served as a Director and Treasurer for the USA Gymnastics Board of Directors. He was recruited for the board following the sexual abuse scandal and played a central role in rebuilding the organization’s leadership, culture, and reputation—focusing on transparency, athlete safety, financial discipline, and regaining community trust. He also served on the board of Thriveworks, a provider of mental health services, and currently serves on the Leadership Council of the Positive Coaching Alliance, which promotes character-building through positive coaching.

Lang has most recently resided in the San Francisco Bay Area with wife, Beth Van Schaack.

=== Honors ===
In December 2014, Lang was announced as one of the six recipients of the 2015 Silver Anniversary Awards, presented annually by the NCAA to outstanding former student-athletes on the 25th anniversary of the end of their college sports careers. The award is based on both athletic and professional success.

Lang became a member of the University of Michigan Athletics Hall of Honor in 2015.

He has been recognized for his business achievements, particularly at Vocera, with the CEO World Award. He was an EY Entrepreneur of the Year® Award finalist and is a Forbes Technology Council member.

== See also ==
- List of Olympic medalists in swimming (men)
- List of University of Michigan alumni
- List of World Aquatics Championships medalists in swimming (men)
