= Kurt Krumpholz =

American swimmer

Medal record

Men's swimming

Representing the United States

World Championships (LC)
Gold medal – first place	1973 Belgrade	4×200 m freestyle
Silver medal – second place	1973 Belgrade	200 m freestyle

Kurt Krumpholz is a former American swimmer. He represented the United States at the 1973 World Aquatics Championships in Belgrad, where he won two medals. At the 1972 U.S. Olympic Team Trials, Krumpholz set the world record in the prelims of the 400-meter freestyle. However, in the final, Krumpholz placed sixth, not making the Olympic team. The following year, Krumpholz won a gold medal in the 4×200-meter freestyle relay and a silver medal in the 200-meter freestyle at the 1973 World Aquatics Championships. His gold in the 4×200-meter freestyle relay came in world record time. Krumpholz was initially a water polo player for UCLA and only swam to stay in shape. Before his world record swim, Krumpholz swam the event only three times. Krumpholz's son, J. W. Krumpholz, is a water polo player and Olympic silver medallist from the 2008 Summer Olympics.

== See also ==
- List of World Aquatics Championships medalists in swimming (men)
- World record progression 400 metres freestyle
- World record progression 4 × 200 metres freestyle relay

Records
Preceded by Brad Cooper	Men's 400 metres freestyle world record holder (long course); August 4, 1972 – September 9, 1973	Succeeded by Rick DeMont
