= Li Tao (swimmer) =

Chinese swimmer

Personal information
- Born: 9 March 1968 (age 58)

Sport
- Sport: Swimming

Li Tao (Chinese: 李涛, born 8 March 1968) is a Chinese swimmer. He competed in the men's 4 × 100 metre freestyle relay at the 1988 Summer Olympics.
