= Villaret's syndrome =

Villaret’s syndrome
- Other names: Retroparotid space syndrome, Syndrome of retroparotid space
- Specialty: Neurology

Villaret's syndrome combines ipsilateral paralysis of the last four cranial nerves (IX, X, XI, XII) and Horner syndrome (enophthalmos, ptosis, miosis). Sometimes cranial nerve VII is also involved. It may also involve the cervical ganglia of the sympathetic trunk. Paralysis is caused by a lesion in the retroparotid space, which is bounded posteriorly by the cervical vertebrae, superiorly by the skull near the jugular foramen, anteriorly by the parotid gland, laterally by the sternocleidomastoid muscle, and medially by the pharynx.

The clinical features are dysphonia (paralysis of the vocal cords) and anesthesia of the larynx; dysphagia (difficulty in swallowing solids caused by paralysis of the superior constriction of the pharynx); paralysis of soft palate and fauces with anesthesia of these parts and of the pharynx; loss of taste in the posterior third of the tongue and tongue deviation to affected side; weakness of sternocleidomastoid (caused by paralysis of the sternocleidomastoid and trapezius), Horner’s syndrome (due to paralysis of the cervical sympathetic nerves), ipsilateral lower motor neurone facial weakness. The investigation of choice is imaging of retropharyngeal space with magnetic resonance imaging (MRI), specifically looking for tumour or infection.

The syndrome was first described by Maurice Villaret (1877–1946), a French neurologist.
