= Dirk Richter =

German swimmer (born 1964)

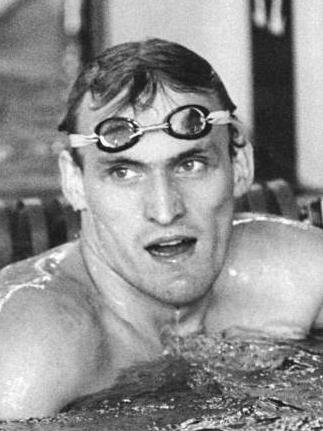
- Richter in 1990

Personal information
- Born: 12 September 1964 (age 61) Cottbus, East Germany
Medal record
Men's swimming
Representing East Germany
Olympic Games
Bronze medal – third place	1988 Seoul	4×100 m freestyle
World Championships (LC)
Gold medal – first place	1982 Guayaquil	100 m backstroke
Gold medal – first place	1986 Madrid	4x200 m freestyle
Silver medal – second place	1986 Madrid	100 m backstroke
Bronze medal – third place	1986 Madrid	4×100 m freestyle
European Championships (LC)
Gold medal – first place	1983 Rome	100 m backstroke
Gold medal – first place	1987 Strasbourg	4×100 m freestyle
Silver medal – second place	1983 Rome	4×200 m freestyle
Silver medal – second place	1985 Sofia	100 m backstroke
Silver medal – second place	1985 Sofia	4×100 m freestyle
Silver medal – second place	1985 Sofia	4×100 m medley
Bronze medal – third place	1981 Split	4×100 m medley
Bronze medal – third place	1983 Rome	4×100 m freestyle
Bronze medal – third place	1983 Rome	4×100 m medley
Bronze medal – third place	1987 Strasbourg	100 m freestyle
Bronze medal – third place	1989 Bonn	100 m backstroke
Friendship Games
Gold medal – first place	1984 Moscow	100 m backstroke
Bronze medal – third place	1984 Moscow	200 metre backstroke
Gold medal – first place	1984 Moscow	4×200 m freestyle relay
Silver medal – second place	1984 Moscow	4×100 m medley
Silver medal – second place	1984 Moscow	4×100 m freestyle relay
Representing Germany
Olympic Games
Bronze medal – third place	1992 Barcelona	4×100 m freestyle
World Championships (LC)
Silver medal – second place	1991 Perth	4×100 m freestyle
Bronze medal – third place	1991 Perth	4×100 m medley
European Championships (LC)
Silver medal – second place	1991 Athens	100 m backstroke
Silver medal – second place	1991 Athens	200 m backstroke
Silver medal – second place	1991 Athens	4×100 m freestyle

Dirk Richter (born 12 September 1964) is a former swimmer from East Germany, who won the bronze medal in the 4×100 freestyle medley twice during the Summer Olympics. He did so in 1988 with the East German team, alongside Thomas Flemming, Lars Hinneburg, and Steffen Zesner.

Four years later, when Barcelona, Spain hosted the Games, Richter represented Germany and ended up third alongside Mark Pinger, Christian Tröger, and Steffen Zesner.
