= Augustin Nicolas Gilbert =

French physician (1858–1927)

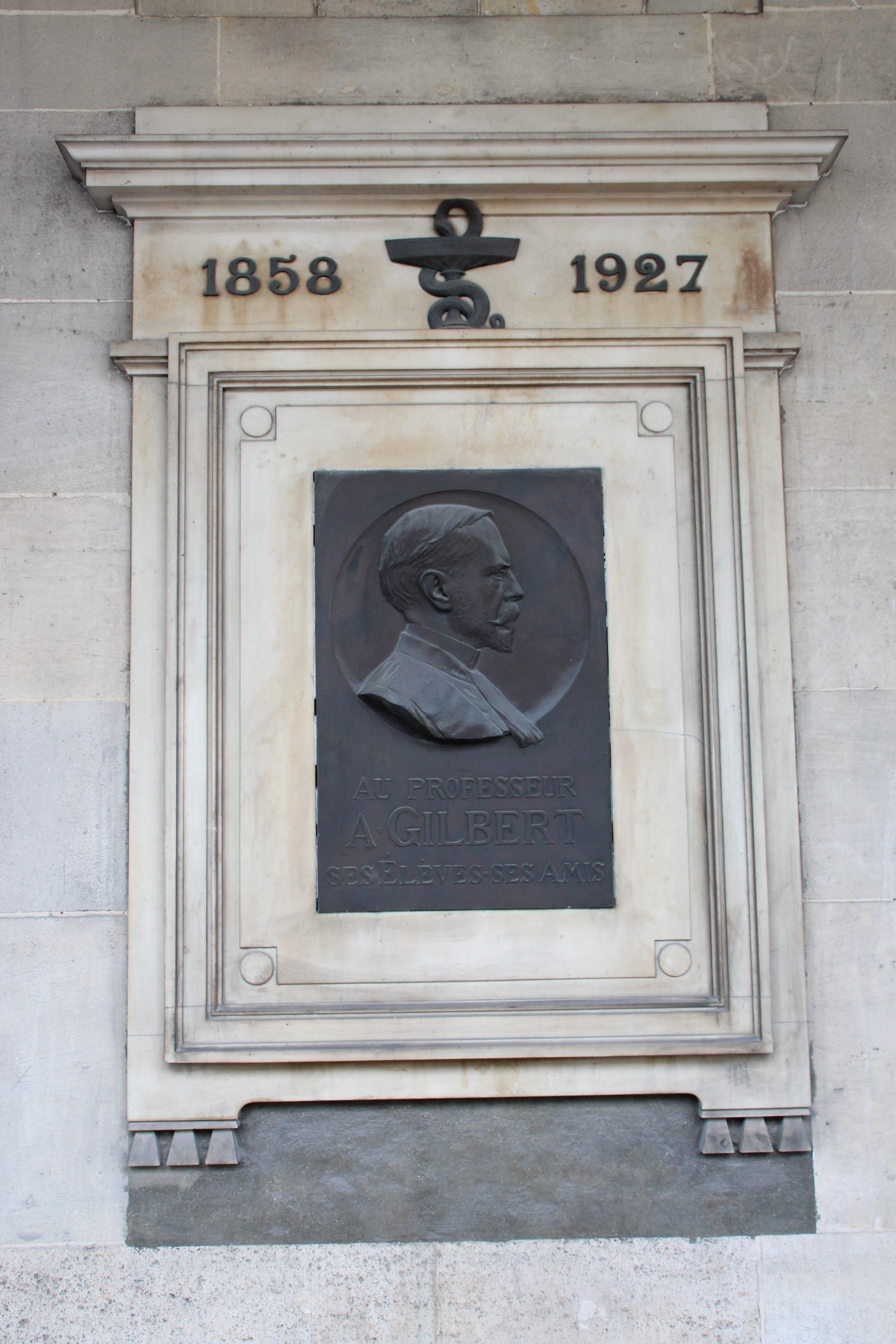
Commemorative plaque of Professor A. Gilbert at Hôtel-Dieu in Paris.

Augustin Nicolas Gilbert (French pronunciation: [oɡystɛ̃ nikɔla ʒilbɛʁ]; 15 February 1858 – 4 March 1927) was a French physician. He was born in the town of Buzancy, Ardennes, and died in Paris.

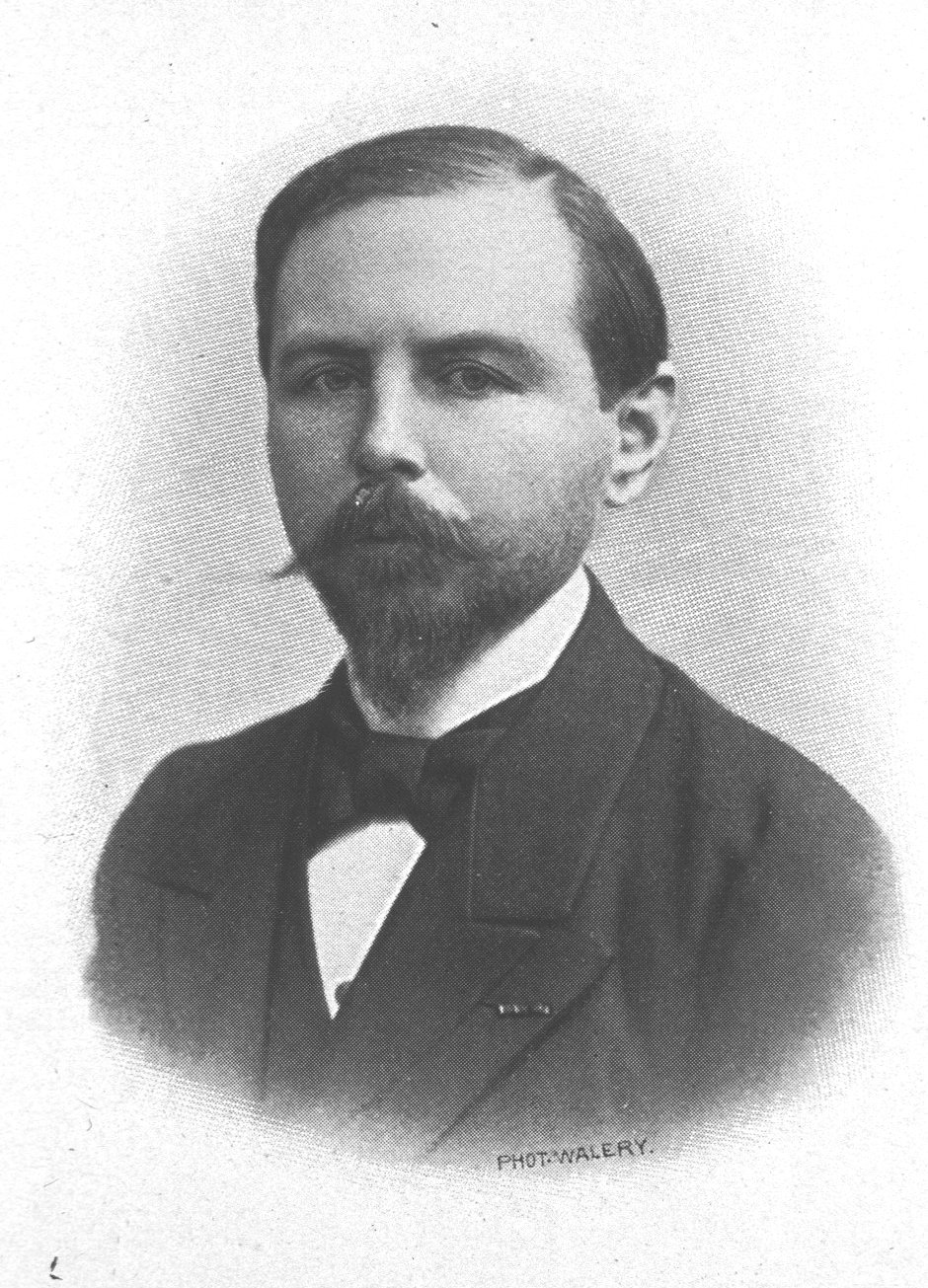

He received his doctorate from the University of Paris and became an intern at the Hôtel-Dieu de Paris. Later he was a professor of therapeutics (1902) and clinical medicine (1905) at Hôtel-Dieu. In 1907 he became a member of the Académie de Médecine.

He published many articles and books on a wide array of medical subjects. With Jean Alfred Fournier (1832-1914) he published Bibliothèque rouge de l'étudiant en médecine, and with Paul Brouardel (1837-1906) and others, he published the multi-volume Traité de médecine et de Thérapeutique. With neurologist Maurice Villaret (1877–1946), he conducted extensive research of portal hypertension.

Gilbert described a hereditary cause of increased bilirubin; today this disorder is known as Gilbert's syndrome and is believed to be caused by a deficiency of the enzyme glucuronosyltransferase.

== Works ==
- Formulaire : [ancien Formulaire de Dujardin-Beaumetz] . Doin, Paris 23e Ed. 1911 Digital edition by the University and State Library Düsseldorf
