= Swimming at the 1988 Summer Olympics – Men's 4 × 100 metre freestyle relay =

Men's 4 × 100 metre freestyle relay at the Games of the XXIV Olympiad
- Venue: Jamsil Indoor Swimming Pool
- Date: 23 September 1988 (heats & final)
- Competitors: 95 from 22 nations
- Teams: 22
- Winning time: 3:16.53 WR

Medalists
1st place, gold medalist(s)		Chris Jacobs, Troy Dalbey, Tom Jager, Matt Biondi, Brent Lang*, Doug Gjertsen*, Shaun Jordan*	United States
2nd place, silver medalist(s)		Gennadiy Prigoda, Iurie Başcatov, Nikolay Yevseyev, Volodymyr Tkachenko, Raimundas Mažuolis*, Oleksiy Boryslavskiy*	Soviet Union
3rd place, bronze medalist(s)		Dirk Richter, Thomas Flemming, Lars Hinneburg, Steffen Zesner; *Indicates the swimmer only competed in the preliminary heats.	East Germany

The men's 4 × 100 metre freestyle relay event at the 1988 Summer Olympics took place on 23 September at the Jamsil Indoor Swimming Pool in Seoul, South Korea.

== Records ==
Prior to this competition, the existing world and Olympic records were as follows.

World record	United States (USA); Chris Cavanaugh (50.83); Mike Heath (49.60); Matt Biondi (49.67); Rowdy Gaines (48.93)	3:19.03	Los Angeles, United States	2 August 1984
Olympic record	United States; Chris Cavanaugh (50.83); Mike Heath (49.60); Matt Biondi (49.67); Rowdy Gaines (48.93)	3:19.03	Los Angeles, United States	2 August 1984

The following new world and Olympic records were set during this competition.

Date	Event	Name	Nationality	Time	Record
23 September	Final	Chris Jacobs (49.63); Troy Dalbey (49.75); Tom Jager (49.34); Matt Biondi (47.81)	United States	3:16.53	WR

== Results ==
=== Heats ===
Rule: The eight fastest teams advance to the final (Q).

Rank	Heat	Nation	Swimmers	Time	Notes
1	3	United States	Brent Lang (50.18); Doug Gjertsen (49.64); Shaun Jordan (50.19); Troy Dalbey (49.51)	3:19.52	Q
2	3	Soviet Union	Raimundas Mažuolis (50.90); Oleksiy Boryslavskiy (49.95); Nikolay Yevseyev (49.21); Volodymyr Tkachenko (49.83)	3:19.89	Q
3	3	East Germany	Dirk Richter (50.30); Thomas Flemming (50.01); Lars Hinneburg (50.11); Steffen Zesner (50.05)	3:20.47	Q
4	3	France	Stéphan Caron (50.68); Christophe Kalfayan (50.54); Laurent Neuville (50.45); Bruno Gutzeit (50.10)	3:21.77	Q
5	1	Sweden	Tommy Werner (50.92); Rikard Milton (51.38); Joakim Holmquist (50.48); Göran Titus (50.31)	3:23.09	Q
6	2	West Germany	Björn Zikarsky (51.09); Peter Sitt (51.02); Thomas Fahrner (51.09); Torsten Wiegel (49.99)	3:23.19	Q
7	2	Italy	Fabrizio Rampazzo (51.83); Giorgio Lamberti (49.93); Andrea Ceccarini (51.25); Roberto Gleria (50.34)	3:23.35	Q
8	2	Great Britain	Andy Jameson (51.40); Mark Foster (50.81); Mike Fibbens (50.68); Roland Lee (50.82)	3:23.71	Q
9	1	Canada	Mark Andrews (51.66); Stephen Vandermeulen (50.90); Vlastimil Černý (51.14); Sandy Goss (50.15)	3:23.85	
10	1	Denmark	Franz Mortensen (51.21); Vagn Høgholm (50.97); Benny Nielsen (51.73); Peter Rohde (51.24)	3:25.15	
11	1	Netherlands	Frank Drost (51.52); Patrick Dybiona (50.86); Hans Kroes (51.57); Ronald Dekker (51.31)	3:25.26	
12	2	Brazil	Emanuel Nascimento (52.13); Cristiano Michelena (52.13); Jorge Fernandes (52.05); Júlio López (51.86)	3:28.17	
13	2	Mexico	Rodrigo González (51.48); Ignacio Escamilla (53.48); Jorge Alarcón (52.51); Urbano Zea (52.25)	3:29.72	
14	1	Portugal	Mabílio Albuquerque (53.06); Henrique Villaret (52.87); Vasco Sousa (53.73); Sérgio Esteves (53.65)	3:33.31	
15	3	Singapore	Ang Peng Siong (52.28); David Lim Fong Jock (53.01); Oon Jin Gee (52.77); Desmond Koh (56.48)	3:34.54	
16	2	Hong Kong	Michael Wright (53.74); Li Khai Kam (52.79); Arthur Li Kai Yien (53.48); Tsang Yi Ming (54.77)	3:34.78	
17	2	South Korea	Kwon Sang-won (54.18); Yang Wook (54.17); Song Kwang-sun (54.25); Kwon Soon-kun (55.45)	3:38.05	
18	1	Virgin Islands	Hans Foerster (54.23); Kraig Singleton (56.51); Kristan Singleton (57.78); William Cleveland (54.71)	3:43.23	
19	3	United Arab Emirates	Ahmad Faraj (58.29); Mohamed Abdullah (1:00.80); Bassam Al-Ansari (1:00.92); Mohamed Bin Abid (58.91)	3:58.92	
	2	China	Shen Jianqiang; Li Tao; Xie Jun; Feng Qiangbiao	DSQ	
	3	Egypt	Mohamed El-Azoul; Amin Amer; Mohamed Hassan; Moustafa Amer	DSQ	
	3	Austria	Stefan Opatril; Markus Opatril; Alexander Placheta; Alexander Pilhatsch	DSQ	

=== Final ===
Rank	Lane	Nation	Swimmers	Time	Notes
1st place, gold medalist(s)	4	United States	Chris Jacobs (49.63); Troy Dalbey (49.75); Tom Jager (49.34); Matt Biondi (47.81)	3:16.53	WR
2nd place, silver medalist(s)	5	Soviet Union	Gennadiy Prigoda (50.24); Iurie Başcatov (49.30); Nikolay Yevseyev (49.27); Volodymyr Tkachenko (49.52)	3:18.33	EU
3rd place, bronze medalist(s)	3	East Germany	Dirk Richter (50.25); Thomas Flemming (49.70); Lars Hinneburg (50.35); Steffen Zesner (49.52)	3:19.82	
4	6	France	Stéphan Caron (49.97); Christophe Kalfayan (50.09); Laurent Neuville (50.04); Bruno Gutzeit (49.92)	3:20.02	NR
5	2	Sweden	Per Johansson (50.58); Tommy Werner (50.00); Joakim Holmquist (50.47); Göran Titus (50.02)	3:21.07	NR
6	7	West Germany	Michael Gross (50.66); Thomas Fahrner (50.00); Björn Zikarsky (50.40); Peter Sitt (50.59)	3:21.65	
7	8	Great Britain	Mike Fibbens (51.36); Mark Foster (50.20); Roland Lee (50.33); Andy Jameson (49.82)	3:21.71	NR
8	1	Italy	Roberto Gleria (50.51); Giorgio Lamberti (50.31); Fabrizio Rampazzo (51.19); Andrea Ceccarini (50.92)	3:22.93	
