= Oleksiy Boryslavskiy =

Ukrainian swimmer

Personal information
- Nationality: Ukrainian
- Born: 17 November 1968 (age 57) Zuhres, Ukrainian SSR, Soviet Union

Sport
- Sport: Swimming
Medal record
Representing the Soviet Union
Olympic Games
Silver medal – second place	1988 Seoul	4x100 m freestyle relay

Oleksiy Boryslavskiy (born 17 November 1968) is a Ukrainian swimmer. He competed in the men's 4 × 100 metre freestyle relay (during the preliminary heats) at the 1988 Summer Olympics representing the Soviet Union, earning a silver medal for his participation.
