= Volodymyr Tkachenko (swimmer) =

Ukrainian swimmer

Personal information
- Born: June 28, 1965 (age 61)

Sport
- Sport: Swimming
Medal record
Representing the Soviet Union
Olympic Games
Silver medal – second place	1988 Seoul	4x100 m freestyle relay
European Championships
Gold medal – first place	1989 Bonn	50m freestyle
Gold medal – first place	1983 Rome	4x100m freestyle relay
Bronze medal – third place	1987 Strasbourg	4x100m freestyle relay
Bronze medal – third place	1991 Athens	50m freestyle

Volodymyr Valentynovych Tkachenko (Ukrainian: Володимир Валентинович Ткаченко; born 28 June 1965) is a Ukrainian former swimmer who competed in the 1988 Summer Olympics. Tkachenko earned a silver medal for his participation in the preliminary heats of the Men's 4 x 100 meter freestyle relay.
