= Maurice Villaret =

French neurologist (1877–1946)

Maurice Villaret (7 September 1877 – 25 January 1946) was a French neurologist born in Paris.

In 1906 he received his medical doctorate from the University of Paris. In 1919 he became médecin des hôpitaux in Paris, and subsequently served as médecin chef at the Hôpital Necker. In 1927 he became a professor of hydrotherapy and climatology, and in 1939 was appointed clinical professor at the Hôpital Broussais.

He is remembered for his studies and experiments involving precision localization of vascular lesions of the brain. In 1917 he described what was to become known as "Villaret's syndrome". This syndrome is characterized by an ipsilateral paralysis of cranial nerve numbers IX, X, XI, XII, and sometimes cranial nerve number VII. It may also involve the cervical ganglia of the sympathetic trunk. Paralysis is caused by a lesion in the posterior retroparotid space.

- Nerve IX involvement ==> loss of posterior taste of tongue
- Nerve X involvement ==> Loss of sensation of soft palate, pharynx and larynx
- Nerve XII involvement ==> Ipsilateral deviation of tongue
- Sympathetic involvement ==> Horner's syndrome

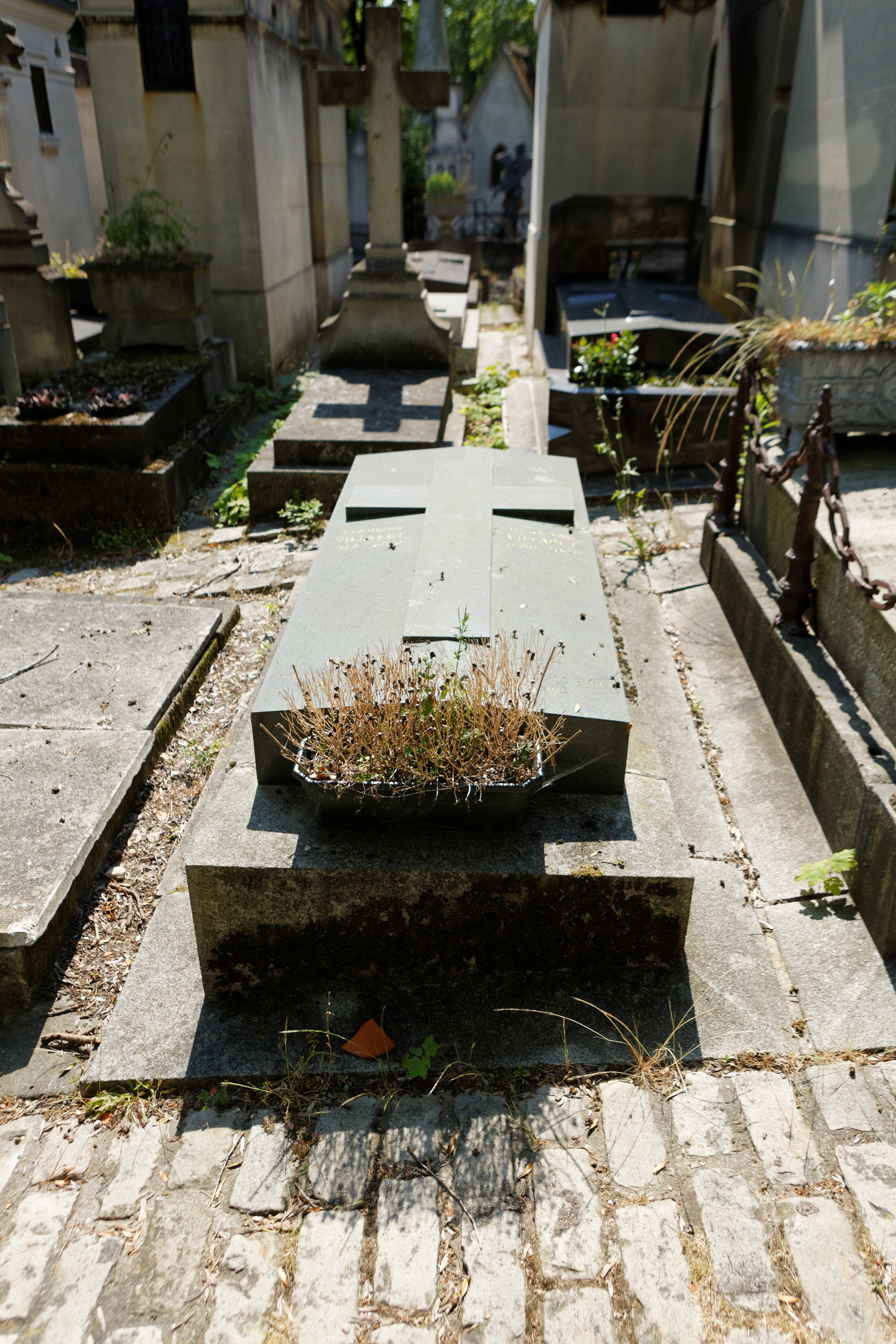
Tomb of Villaret at Père-Lachaise Cemetery in Paris

With his mentor Augustin Nicolas Gilbert (1858-1927), Villaret performed extensive research involving the physiology of the portal venous system, and had particular interest in the causes of portal hypertension. He also undertook several pathological studies of cirrhosis.

== Bibliography ==
- Le syndrome nerveux de l’espace rétro-parotidien postérieur. Revue neurologique, Paris, 1916, 23, part 1: 188–190.
- Contribution à l’étude du syndrome d’hypertension partiale. Paris, 1906.
