= Yuri Bashkatov =

Soviet swimmer (1968–2022)

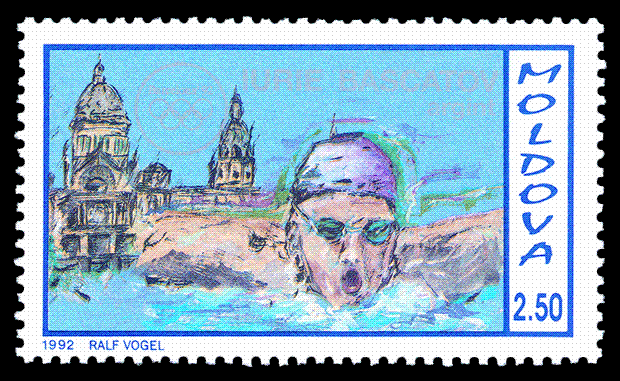

Personal information
- Born: 20 June 1968 Chișinău, Moldavian SSR, Soviet Union
- Died: 3 September 2022 (aged 54)
- Height: 1.90 m (6 ft 3 in)
- Weight: 85 kg (187 lb)

Sport
- Sport: Swimming
- Club: Dynamo Chişinău (1986–1992)
Medal record
Olympic Games
Representing the Soviet Union
Silver medal – second place	1988 Seoul	4x100 m freestyle
Representing the Unified Team
Silver medal – second place	1992 Barcelona	4x100 m freestyle
World Championships (LC)
Representing the Soviet Union
Bronze medal – third place	1991 Perth	4×100 m freestyle
European Championships
Gold medal – first place	1989 Bonn	4×100 m medley
Silver medal – second place	1989 Bonn	100 m freestyle

Yuri Nikolayevich Bashkatov (Russian: Ю́рий Никола́евич Башка́тов, Romanian: Iurie Nicolaevici Başcatov; 20 June 1968 – 3 September 2022) was a Soviet (Moldovan) freestyle swimmer and graduate of the Technical University of Moldova.

In 1988, he won the national championships in the 100 m freestyle, setting a new Soviet record and qualifying for the Olympics. He competed at the 1988 and 1992 Summer Olympics, winning silver medals in the 4 × 100 m freestyle relay on both occasions; in 1988, he also finished fifth in the individual 100 m freestyle. Bashkatov won three medals, including one gold, at the 1989 European Aquatics Championships and 1991 World Aquatics Championships.
