= Thomas Flemming =

East German swimmer

Personal information
- Full name: Thomas Flemming
- Nationality: East German
- Born: 14 July 1967 (age 58) Schlema im Erzgebirge, Bezirk Karl-Marx-Stadt, East Germany
- Height: 1.89 m (6 ft 2 in)
- Weight: 86 kg (190 lb)

Sport
- Sport: Swimming
- Strokes: Freestyle
- Club: SC Karl-Marx-Stadt
Medal record
Men's swimming
Representing East Germany
Olympic Games
Silver medal – second place	1988 Seoul	4×200 m freestyle
Bronze medal – third place	1988 Seoul	4×100 m freestyle
World Championships (LC)
Gold medal – first place	1986 Madrid	4×200 m freestyle
European Championships (LC)
Gold medal – first place	1987 Strasbourg	4×100 m freestyle
Silver medal – second place	1987 Strasbourg	4×200 m freestyle
Bronze medal – third place	1989 Bonn	4×200 m freestyle

Thomas Flemming (born 14 July 1967, in Bad Schlema) is a former freestyle swimmer from East Germany who competed for his native country at the 1988 Summer Olympics. There he won the silver medal in the 4×200 m freestyle, alongside Uwe Dassler, Sven Lodziewski, and Steffen Zesner. Flemming also won the bronze medal in the 4×100 m freestyle, together with Steffen Zesner, Lars Hinneburg, and Dirk Richter.
