= Vasco Sousa (swimmer) =

Portuguese swimmer

Personal information
- Nationality: Portuguese
- Born: 10 March 1964 (age 62)

Sport
- Sport: Swimming

Vasco Sousa (born 10 March 1964) is a Portuguese swimmer. He competed in the men's 4 × 100 metre freestyle relay at the 1988 Summer Olympics.
