= Henrique Villaret =

Portuguese swimmer

Personal information
- Born: 10 December 1964 (age 61)

Sport
- Sport: Swimming

Henrique Villaret (born 10 December 1964) is a Portuguese swimmer. He competed in the men's 4 × 100 metre freestyle relay at the 1988 Summer Olympics.
