= Steffen Zesner =

German swimmer

Personal information
- Full name: Steffen Zesner
- Nationality: East Germany (until 1990); Germany
- Born: 28 September 1967 (age 58) Herzberg (Elster), Brandenburg, East Germany
- Height: 1.85 m (6 ft 1 in)
- Weight: 80 kg (176 lb)

Sport
- Sport: Swimming
- Strokes: Freestyle
- Club: SC Dynamo Berlin; SC Berlin
Medal record
Men's swimming
Olympic Games
Representing East Germany
| Silver medal – second place | 1988 Seoul | 4×200 m freestyle |
| Bronze medal – third place | 1988 Seoul | 4×100 m freestyle |
Representing Germany
| Bronze medal – third place | 1992 Barcelona | 4×100 m freestyle |
| Bronze medal – third place | 1996 Atlanta | 4×200 m freestyle |
World Championships (LC)
| Gold medal – first place | 1991 Perth | 4×200 m freestyle |
| Silver medal – second place | 1991 Perth | 200 m freestyle |
| Silver medal – second place | 1991 Perth | 4×100 m freestyle |
| Bronze medal – third place | 1986 Madrid | 4×100 m freestyle |
| Bronze medal – third place | 1994 Rome | 1500 m freestyle |
| Bronze medal – third place | 1994 Rome | 4×200 m freestyle |
World Championships (SC)
| Silver medal – second place | 1995 Rio de Janeiro | 4×200 m freestyle |
European Championships (LC)
Representing East Germany
| Gold medal – first place | 1987 Strasbourg | 4×100 m freestyle |
| Silver medal – second place | 1987 Strasbourg | 4×200 m freestyle |
| Bronze medal – third place | 1989 Bonn | 4×200 m freestyle |
Representing Germany
| Gold medal – first place | 1995 Vienna | 400 m freestyle |
| Gold medal – first place | 1995 Vienna | 4×200 m freestyle |
| Silver medal – second place | 1991 Athens | 4×100 m freestyle |
| Silver medal – second place | 1993 Sheffield | 4×200 m freestyle |
| Silver medal – second place | 1997 Seville | 4×100 m freestyle |
| Bronze medal – third place | 1991 Athens | 4×200 m freestyle |
| Bronze medal – third place | 1993 Sheffield | 4×100 m freestyle |
| Bronze medal – third place | 1995 Vienna | 1500 m freestyle |
| Bronze medal – third place | 1997 Seville | 4×200 m freestyle |

Steffen Zesner (born 28 September 1967) is a former freestyle swimmer from Germany, who won a total number of four medals as a relay member at the Summer Olympics. His best result was a silver medal, on the 4×200 metres freestyle, alongside Uwe Dassler, Thomas Flemming, and Sven Lodziewski in Seoul, South Korea. He swam for SC Dynamo Berlin and its successor SC Berlin.
