= Swimming at the 1992 Summer Olympics – Women's 200 metre backstroke =

Women's 200 metre backstroke at the Games of the XXV Olympiad
- Venue: Piscines Bernat Picornell
- Date: 31 July 1992 (heats & finals)
- Competitors: 43 from 30 nations
- Winning time: 2:07.06 OR

Medalists
1st place, gold medalist(s)		Krisztina Egerszegi	Hungary
2nd place, silver medalist(s)		Dagmar Hase	Germany
3rd place, bronze medalist(s)		Nicole Stevenson	Australia

The women's 200 metre backstroke event at the 1992 Summer Olympics took place on 31 July at the Piscines Bernat Picornell in Barcelona, Spain.

== Records ==
Prior to this competition, the existing world and Olympic records were as follows.

World record	Krisztina Egerszegi (HUN)	2:06.62	Athens, Greece	25 August 1991
Olympic record	Krisztina Egerszegi (HUN)	2:09.29	Seoul, South Korea	25 September 1988

The following records were established during the competition:

Date	Round	Name	Nationality	Time	Record
31 July	Heat 6	Krisztina Egerszegi	Hungary	2:07.34	OR
31 July	Final A	Krisztina Egerszegi	Hungary	2:07.06	OR

== Results ==
=== Heats ===
Rule: The eight fastest swimmers advance to final A (Q), while the next eight to final B (q).

Rank	Heat	Lane	Name	Nationality	Time	Notes
1	6	4	Krisztina Egerszegi	Hungary	2:07.34	Q, OR
2	4	4	Lea Loveless	United States	2:11.32	Q
3	6	3	Dagmar Hase	Germany	2:11.52	Q
4	4	8	Silvia Poll	Costa Rica	2:11.66	Q, NR
5	5	5	Nicole Stevenson	Australia	2:12.32	Q
6	6	5	Anna Simcic	New Zealand	2:12.99	Q
7	6	2	Leigh Habler	Australia	2:13.44	Q
8	4	5	Tünde Szabó	Hungary	2:13.81	Q
9	5	4	Janie Wagstaff	United States	2:13.91	q, WD
10	5	6	Joanne Deakins	Great Britain	2:14.34	q
10	6	6	Nina Zhivanevskaya	Unified Team	2:14.34	q
12	4	6	Marion Zoller	Germany	2:14.53	q
13	5	3	Lorenza Vigarani	Italy	2:15.49	q
14	5	8	Noriko Inada	Japan	2:15.74	q
15	6	7	Lin Li	China	2:15.87	q
16	3	5	Nathalie Wunderlich	Switzerland	2:16.07	q, NR
17	5	1	Junko Torikai	Japan	2:16.13	q
18	4	1	Núria Castelló	Spain	2:16.24	
19	2	7	Akiko Thomson	Philippines	2:16.44	NR
20	6	1	Francesca Salvalajo	Italy	2:16.89	
21	4	3	Katherine Read	Great Britain	2:17.15	
22	4	7	Ellen Elzerman	Netherlands	2:17.34	
23	5	2	Nikki Dryden	Canada	2:17.54	
24	3	1	Ana Barros	Portugal	2:17.59	
25	5	7	Beth Hazel	Canada	2:17.70	
26	3	7	Małgorzata Galwas	Poland	2:17.73	NR
27	3	6	Rita Jean Garay	Puerto Rico	2:18.10	
28	2	4	Lee Chang-ha	South Korea	2:18.33	
29	3	4	Claudia Stănescu	Romania	2:18.39	
30	3	3	Helena Straková	Czechoslovakia	2:18.44	
31	6	8	Lü Bin	China	2:18.51	
32	2	6	Jill Brukman	South Africa	2:18.56	
33	4	2	Natalya Shibayeva	Unified Team	2:20.52	
34	3	2	Cristina Rey	Spain	2:20.75	
35	2	5	Michelle Smith	Ireland	2:21.37	
36	1	4	Mariya Kocheva	Bulgaria	2:21.79	
37	1	7	Darija Alauf	Independent Olympic Participants	2:22.07	
38	2	3	Marta Włodkowska	Poland	2:22.86	
39	1	6	Storme Moodie	Zimbabwe	2:23.26	
40	1	3	Sarah-Jane Murphy	Zimbabwe	2:24.58	
41	2	2	Tanja Godina	Slovenia	2:25.31	
42	1	5	Praphalsai Minpraphal	Thailand	2:26.32	
43	1	2	Ana Joselina Fortin	Honduras	2:27.33	

=== Finals ===
==== Final B ====
Rank	Lane	Name	Nationality	Time	Notes
9	3	Marion Zoller	Germany	2:13.77	
10	4	Joanne Deakins	Great Britain	2:13.91	
11	8	Junko Torikai	Japan	2:15.20	
12	7	Lin Li	China	2:15.38	
13	6	Lorenza Vigarani	Italy	2:16.21	
14	5	Nina Zhivanevskaya	Unified Team	2:17.61	
15	2	Noriko Inada	Japan	2:17.68	
16	1	Nathalie Wunderlich	Switzerland	2:19.70	

==== Final A ====
Rank	Lane	Name	Nationality	Time	Notes
1st place, gold medalist(s)	4	Krisztina Egerszegi	Hungary	2:07.06	OR
2nd place, silver medalist(s)	3	Dagmar Hase	Germany	2:09.46	NR
3rd place, bronze medalist(s)	2	Nicole Stevenson	Australia	2:10.20	OC
4	5	Lea Loveless	United States	2:11.54	
5	7	Anna Simcic	New Zealand	2:11.99	
6	8	Tünde Szabó	Hungary	2:12.94	
7	6	Silvia Poll	Costa Rica	2:12.97	
8	1	Leigh Habler	Australia	2:13.68	
