= List of African Games medalists in swimming (women) =

This is the complete list of women's African Games medalists in swimming from 1973 to 2019. Before 2015 it was known as the All-Africa Games.

== Events ==
=== 50m Freestyle ===
Event	Gold		Silver		Bronze	
1987	Tunisia; Senda Gharbi		Madagascar; Bako Ratsifa		Egypt; Hela Ghazi	
1991	Egypt; Rania Elwani		Nigeria; Joshua Ikhaghomi		Namibia; Monica Dahl	
1995	Egypt; Rania Elwany		South Africa; Helene Muller		South Africa; Marianne Kriel	
1999	Rania Elwani; Egypt; Stacey Bowley; South Africa	26.56	not awarded		Kirsty Coventry; Zimbabwe	26.72
2003	Lauren Roets; South Africa	26.31	Ngozi Monu; Nigeria	27.71	Nadia Chahed; Tunisia	28.16
2007	Kirsty Coventry; Zimbabwe	26.19	Heather Brand; Zimbabwe	26.65	Sarra Chahed; Tunisia	26.72
2011	Karin Prinsloo; South Africa	25.98	Nicole Horn; Zimbabwe	26.73	Suzaan van Biljon; South Africa	26.75
2015	Farida Osman; Egypt	25.12 GR	Karin Prinsloo; South Africa	25.79	Rowan El Badry; Egypt	26.04
2019	Erin Gallagher; South Africa	24.95; GR, NR	Farida Osman; Egypt	25.06	Emma Chelius; South Africa	25.25

=== 100m Freestyle ===
Event	Gold		Silver		Bronze	
1973	Egypt; Faten Afifi		Egypt; Nesrine Sayed		Nigeria; Bassey Ebito	
1978	Tunisia; Myriam Mizouni		Algeria; Zaza Affane		Egypt; Azza Senjar	
1987	Tunisia; Senda Gharbi		Tunisia; Faten Ghattas		Madagascar; Bako Ratsifa	
1991	Egypt; Rania Elwani		Mauritius; Corinne Leclair		Nigeria; Joshua Ikhaghomi	
1995	Egypt; Rania Elwany		South Africa; Marianne Kriel		South Africa; Marieke Theunissen	
1999	Charlene Wittstock; South Africa	57.46	Teresa Moodie; Zimbabwe	58.04	Rania Elwani; Egypt	58.12
2003	Lauren Roets; South Africa	56.79	Christin Zwiegers; South Africa	57.90	Salama Ismail; Egypt	58.53
2007	Melissa Corfe; South Africa	57.44	Liezi Mari Burger; South Africa	58.03	Heather Brand; Zimbabwe	58.08
2011	Karin Prinsloo; South Africa	56.05 GR	Nicole Horn; Zimbabwe	58.01	Zeineb Khalfallah; Tunisia	58.11
2015	Farida Osman; Egypt	55.41 GR	Karin Prinsloo; South Africa	55.69	Rowan El Badry; Egypt	57.03
2019	Erin Gallagher; South Africa	55.13; GR	Farida Osman; Egypt	55.62	Emma Chelius; South Africa	55.86

=== 200m Freestyle ===
Event	Gold		Silver		Bronze	
1973	Egypt; Faten Afifi		Egypt; Nahla Demerdech		Zambia; Angela Hugues	
1978	Tunisia; Myriam Mizouni		Egypt; Azza Senjar		Algeria; Zaza Affane	
1987	Tunisia; Senda Gharbi		Tunisia; Faten Ghattas		Egypt; Sherwite Hafez	
1991	Egypt; Rania Elwani		Mauritius; Corinne Leclair		Algeria; Insaf Hemmiche	
1991	Algeria; Mahdia Mohamedi		Algeria; Mahdia Bella		Madagascar; Vola Hanta Ratsifa Andrihamanana	
1995	Egypt; Rania Elwany		South Africa; Karen Allers		Zimbabwe; Mandy Leach	
1999	Kim van Selm; South Africa	2:05.50	Kirsten van Heerden; South Africa	2:06.15	Rania Elwani; Egypt	2:08.08
2003	Lauren Roets; South Africa	2:06.27	Kirsten van Heerden; South Africa	2:08.84	Khadija Ciss; Senegal	2:09.00
2007	Melissa Corfe; South Africa	2:02.45	Maroua Mathlouthi; Tunisia	2:05.11	Katheryn Meaklim; South Africa	2:06.32
2011	Karin Prinsloo; South Africa	1:59.84 GR	Zeineb Khalfallah; Tunisia	2:05.44	Natasha De Vos; South Africa	2:06.20
2015	Karin Prinsloo; South Africa	2:00.14	Marlies Ross; South Africa	2:02.61	Majda Chebaraka; Algeria	2:02.63
2019	Hania Moro; Egypt	2:04.31	Christin Mundell; South Africa	2:04.75	Majda Chebaraka; Algeria	2:05.51

=== 400m Freestyle ===
Event	Gold		Silver		Bronze	
1978	Tunisia; Myriam Mizouni		Egypt; Azza Senjar		Algeria; Zaza Affane	
1987	Egypt; Sherwite Hafez		Tunisia; Faten Ghattas		Algeria; Souad Allim	
1991	Mauritius; Corinne Leclair		Zimbabwe; Lindsay Tudor Cole		Namibia; Frauke Bucking	
1995	South Africa; Karen Allers		South Africa; Marieke Theunissen		Namibia; Anita Kruger	
1999	Kim van Selm; South Africa	4:26.50	Kirsten van Heerden; South Africa	4:27.04	Boutheina Elouer; Tunisia	4:40.03
2003	Kirsten van Heerden; South Africa	4:28.19	Heba Selim; Egypt	4:29.13	Shrone Austin; Seychelles	4:30.84
2007	Melissa Corfe; South Africa	4:15.53	Katheryn Meaklim; South Africa	4:21.97	Maroua Mathlouthi; Tunisia	4:25.83
2011	Roxanne Tammadge; South Africa	4:19.73	Sarra Lajnef; Tunisia	4:20.75 NR	Rene Warnes; South Africa	4:21.58
2015	Karin Prinsloo; South Africa	4:18.86	Majda Chebaraka; Algeria	4:19.24	Marlies Ross; South Africa	4:19.43
2019	Hania Moro; Egypt	4:21.36	Christin Mundell; South Africa	4:22.95	Majda Chebaraka; Algeria	4:24.60

=== 800m Freestyle ===
Event	Gold		Silver		Bronze	
1978	Tunisia; Myriam Mizouni		Egypt; Azza Senjar		Egypt; Meriem Farid	
1987	Algeria; Souad Allim		Egypt; Sherwite Hafez		Algeria; Laila Ouassar	
1991	Egypt; Rania Elwani		Mauritius; Corinne Leclair		Namibia; Frauke Bucking	
1995	South Africa; Robyn Bradley		South Africa; Tracy-Lee Elliott		Namibia; Anita Kruger	
1999	Kim van Selm; South Africa	9:13.30	Bronwyn Dedekind; South Africa	9:19.04	Maha Elmerghany; Egypt	9:44.72
2003	Natalie du Toit; South Africa	9:09.66	Shrone Austin; Seychelles	9:13.03	Heba Selim; Egypt	9:17.15
2007	Kirsty Coventry; Zimbabwe	8:43.89	Maroua Mathlouthi; Tunisia	8:57.91	Dominique Dryding; South Africa	9:13.12
2011	Roxanne Tammadge; South Africa	8:54.64	Rene Warnes; South Africa	8:59.23	Shrone Austin; Seychelles	9:08.10
2015	Majda Chebaraka; Algeria	8:58.53	Charlise Oberholzer; South Africa	9:00.15	Roaia Mashaly; Egypt	9:07.94
2019	Hania Moro; Egypt	8:54.01	Samantha Randle; South Africa	8:55.32	Majda Chebaraka; Algeria	9:07.21

=== 1500m Freestyle ===
Event	Gold		Silver		Bronze	
2003	Velia van Rensburg; South Africa	17:24.64	Shrone Austin; Seychelles	17:30.27	Heba Selim; Egypt	17:35.23
2007	Natalie du Toit; South Africa	17:06.05	Maroua Mathlouthi; Tunisia	17:22.83; NR	Dominique Dryding; South Africa	17:31.51
2011	Roxanne Tammadge; South Africa	17:03.22 GR	Melia Mghezzi; Algeria	17:21.95	Shrone Austin; Seychelles	17:27.76
2015	Majda Chebaraka; Algeria	17:07.82	Charlise Oberholzer; South Africa	17:11.34	Souad Cherouati; Algeria	17:18.35
2019	Hania Moro; Egypt	17:06.71	Samantha Randle; South Africa	17:11.07	Carla Antonopoulos; South Africa	17:22.15

=== 50m Backstroke ===
Event	Gold		Silver		Bronze	
2003	Lize-Mari Retief; South Africa	30.10	Romy Altmann; South Africa	30.29	Inyengiyik Obia; Nigeria	31.06
2007	Kirsty Coventry; Zimbabwe	28.89	Chanelle Van Wyk; South Africa	30.35	Jessica Pengelly; South Africa	30.90
2011	Karin Prinsloo; South Africa	29.28	Mandy Loots; South Africa	29.76	Amel Melih; Algeria	31.01
2015	Jessica Ashley Cooper; South Africa	29.05	Naomi Ruele; Botswana	29.70	Alexus Laird; Seychelles	30.07
2019	Erin Gallagher; South Africa	29.05	Felicity Passon; Seychelles	29.17 NR	Naomi Ruele; Botswana	29.22

=== 100m Backstroke ===
Event	Gold		Silver		Bronze	
1973	Egypt; Faten Afifi		Nigeria; G. Mambula		Zambia; Angela Hugues	
1978	Tunisia; Myriam Mizouni		Tunisia; Ahlem Gheribi		Tunisia; Amina Chenik	
1987	Madagascar; Bako Ratsifa		Zimbabwe; Storme Moodie		Egypt; Sherwite Hafez	
1991	Zimbabwe; Sarah Murphy		Zimbabwe; Storme Moodie		Egypt; Rania Elwani	
1995	South Africa; Marianne Kriel		Egypt; Rania Elwany		South Africa; Jill Brukman	
1999	Charlene Wittstock; South Africa	1:04.31	Kirsty Coventry; Zimbabwe	1:05.29	Taryn Ternent; South Africa	1:05.95
2003	Romy Altmann; South Africa	1:02.89	Jo-Ann Bergman; South Africa	1:07.61	Sarah Chahed; Tunisia	1:07.94
2007	Kirsty Coventry; Zimbabwe	1:01.28	Melissa Corfe; South Africa	1:05.64	Karima Lahmar; Algeria	1:06.92; NR
2011	Kirsty Coventry; Zimbabwe	1:00.86 GR	Karin Prinsloo; South Africa	1:01.46	Amel Melih; Algeria	1:07.27
2015	Kirsty Coventry; Zimbabwe	1:01.15	Karin Prinsloo; South Africa	1:02.53	Jessica Ashley Cooper; South Africa	1:03.32
2019	Felicity Passon; Seychelles	1:02.42	Naomi Ruele; Botswana	1:02.62	Kerryn Herbst; South Africa	1:03.76

=== 200m Backstroke ===
Event	Gold		Silver		Bronze	
1978	Tunisia; Ahlem Gheribi		Egypt; Lamia Nabil		Tunisia; Amina Chenik	
1987	Tunisia; Faten Ghattas		Zimbabwe; Storme Moodie		Egypt; Nevine Morgan	
1991	Zimbabwe; Sarah Murphy		Zimbabwe; Storme Moodie		Tunisia; Selma Ben Gharbia	
1995	South Africa; Jill Brukman		South Africa; Marianne Kriel		Zimbabwe; Tanya Gurr	
1999	Mandy Loots; South Africa	2:21.22	Taryn Cokayne; South Africa	2:23.27	Mandy Leach; Zimbabwe	2:29.14
2003	Romy Altmann; South Africa	2:15.15	Lize-Mari Retief; South Africa	2:22.50	Soha Abdallah; Egypt	2:26.12
2007	Kirsty Coventry; Zimbabwe	2:10.66	Melissa Corfe; South Africa	2:13.88	Jessica Pengelly; South Africa	2:15.59
2011	Kirsty Coventry; Zimbabwe	2:12.40	Mandy Loots; South Africa	2:16.68	Natasha De Vos; South Africa	2:18.18
2015	Kirsty Coventry; Zimbabwe	2:13.29	Karin Prinsloo; South Africa	2:14.31	Rim Ouennich; Tunisia	2:20.16
2019	Felicity Passon; Seychelles	2:14.55 NR	Samantha Randle; South Africa	2:15.55	Robyn Lee; Zimbabwe	2:22.50

=== 50m Breastroke ===
Event	Gold		Silver		Bronze	
2003	Ingrid Haiden; South Africa	32.89	Ziada Jardine; South Africa	32.99	Salama Ismail; Egypt	33.33
2007	Suzaan van Biljon; South Africa	32.62	Amira Kouza; Algeria	33.03; NR	Meriem Lamri; Algeria	33.25
2011	Suzaan van Biljon; South Africa	32.88	Miriam Corsini; Mozambique	33.74	Rechael Tonjor; Nigeria	33.81 NR
2015	Tatjana Schoenmaker; South Africa	32.49	Maii Atif; Egypt	32.58	Daniela Lindemeier; Namibia	32.69
2019	Kaylene Corbett; South Africa	32.20; GR	Christin Mundell; South Africa	32.70	Tilka Paljk; Zambia	32.92

=== 100m Breastroke ===
Event	Gold		Silver		Bronze	
1973	Egypt; Youna Shennaoui		Tunisia; Dalila Berriche		Zambia; Glynis Clack	
1978	Nigeria; Mammah Enuwozo Ngozi		Nigeria; Royal Ebi		Algeria; Donyazad Hakem	
1987	Zimbabwe; J. Dorwoo		Madagascar; Bako Ratsifa		Nigeria; Mammah Enuwozo Ngozi	
1991	Algeria; Mahdia Bella		Algeria; Mahdia Mohamedi		Madagascar; Vola Hanta Ratsifa Andrihamanana	
1995	South Africa; Penny Heyns		South Africa; Julia Russell		Zimbabwe; Linnell Tannock	
1999	Penny Heyns; South Africa	1:07.58; GR	Ziada Jardine; South Africa	1:15.31	Nadia Cruz; Angola	1:18.05
2003	Ingrid Haiden; South Africa	1:11.00	Salama Ismail; Egypt	1:11.92	Ziada Jardine; South Africa	1:12.82
2007	Suzaan van Biljon; South Africa	1:09.74	Kirsty Coventry; Zimbabwe	1:11.86	Meriem Lamri; Algeria	1:12.39
2011	Suzaan van Biljon; South Africa	1:10.40	Sarra Lajnef; Tunisia	1:12.78	Samantha Welch; Zimbabwe	1:15.39
2015	Tatjana Schoenmaker; South Africa	1:09.47	Maii Atif; Egypt	1:11.07	Daniela Lindemeir; Namibia	1:11.31
2019	Kaylene Corbett; South Africa	1:09.75	Christin Mundell; South Africa	1:10.67	Sarah Soliman; Egypt	1:13.36

=== 200m Breastroke ===
Event	Gold		Silver		Bronze	
1973	Tunisia; Dalila Berriche		Egypt; Nevin Salah		Zambia; Glynis Clack	
1978	Nigeria; Mammah Enuwozo Ngozi		Algeria; Fatiha Bousoufiane		Tunisia; Rym Zouaoui	
1987	Tunisia; Faten Ghattas		Algeria; Myriam Ben Younes		Madagascar; Vola Hanta Ratsifa Andrihamanana	
1995	South Africa; Penny Heyns		South Africa; Julia Russell		Zimbabwe; Linnell Tannock	
1999	Penny Heyns; South Africa	2:28.00; GR	Sarah Poewe; South Africa	2:32.80	Lauren Harvey; Zimbabwe	2:53.17
2003	Ingrid Haiden; South Africa	2:32.66	Salama Ismail; Egypt	2:37.20	Ziada Jardine; South Africa	2:43.50
2007	Suzaan van Biljon; South Africa	2:32.30	Jessica Pengelly; South Africa	2:32.30	Lydia Yefsah; Algeria	2:37.72
2011	Suzaan van Biljon; South Africa	2:31.53	Sarra Lajnef; Tunisia	2:34.17	Katheryn Meaklim; South Africa	2:36.16
2015	Tatjana Schoenmaker; South Africa	2:28.84	Kelly Gunnell; South Africa	2:31.52	Daniela Lindemeier; Namibia	2:34.23
2019	Kaylene Corbett; South Africa	2:29.23	Christin Mundell; South Africa	2:35.30	Rawan Eldamaty; Egypt	2:39.22

=== 50m Butterfly ===
Event	Gold		Silver		Bronze	
2003	Lize-Mari Retief; South Africa	27.56	Lauren Sparg; South Africa	28.53	May Raafat; Egypt	29.78
2007	Mandy Loots; South Africa	27.60	Heather Brand; Zimbabwe	27.89	Binta Zahra Diop; Senegal	28.35
2011	Farida Osman; Egypt	27.08 GR	Mandy Loots; South Africa	27.30	Binta Zahra Diop; Senegal	28.45
2015	Farida Osman; Egypt	26.31 GR	Vanessa Mohr; South Africa	26.39	Jessica Ashley Cooper; South Africa	27.02
2019	Farida Osman; Egypt	25.94; GR	Erin Gallagher; South Africa	26.24 NR	Emma Chelius; South Africa	27.40

=== 100m Butterfly ===
Event	Gold		Silver		Bronze	
1973	Egypt; Faten Afifi		Egypt; Nahla Demerdech		Nigeria; Funke Zedomi	
1978	Algeria; Zaza Affane		Egypt; Lamia Nabil		Tunisia; Myriam Mizouni	
1987	Tunisia; Faten Ghattas		Egypt; Sherwite Hafez		Madagascar; Bako Ratsifa	
1991	Zimbabwe; Caroline Zwonkoff		Egypt; Nevine Morgan		Tunisia; Meriem Meddeb	
1995	South Africa; Mandy Loots		Egypt; Rania Elwany		South Africa; Leezan Senekal	
1999	Mandy Loots; South Africa	1:01.32; GR	Candice Crafford; South Africa	1:03.64	Teresa Moodie; Zimbabwe	1:05.18
2003	Lize-Mari Retief; South Africa	1:01.78	Lauren Sparg; South Africa	1:02.63	May Raafat; Egypt	1:05.01
2007	Mandy Loots; South Africa	1:00.:09	Heather Brand; Zimbabwe	1:00.61	Ellen Hight; Zambia	1:03.38
2011	Mandy Loots; South Africa	59.86 GR	Kirsty Coventry; Zimbabwe	1:02.20	Bianca Meyer; South Africa	1:03.14
2015	Farida Osman; Egypt	58.83	Vanessa Mohr; South Africa	1:00.26	Rita Naude; South Africa	1:03.86
2019	Farida Osman; Egypt	58.79; GR	Erin Gallagher; South Africa	59.34	Felicity Passon; Seychelles	1:00.61 NR

=== 200m Butterfly ===
Event	Gold		Silver		Bronze	
1978	Egypt; Faten Afifi		Algeria; Zaza Affane		Tunisia; Myriam Mizouni	
1987	Tunisia; Faten Ghattas		Egypt; Sherwite Hafez		Algeria; Nedjma Baizid	
1991	Egypt; Sally Abderraouf		Tunisia; Meriem Meddeb		Egypt; Nevine Morgan	
1995	South Africa; Leezan Senekal		South Africa; Regan Byadwell		Egypt; Lamia Fouad	
1999	Mandy Loots; South Africa	2:16.02; GR	Natalie du Toit; South Africa	2:19.80	Kenza Bennaceur; Algeria	2:33.54
2003	Lize-Mari Retief; South Africa	2:17.47	Chanelle Van Wyk; South Africa	2:20.05	May Raafat; Egypt	2:20.80
2007	Mandy Loots; South Africa	2:14.28	Katheryn Meaklim; South Africa	2:14.77	Heather Brand; Zimbabwe	2:17.59
2011	Mandy Loots; South Africa	2:12.46 GR	Bianca Meyer; South Africa	2:16.66	Sarah Hadj Abdelrahmane; Algeria	2:20.61
2015	Rene Warnes; South Africa	2:16.40	Rwioda Heshem; Egypt	2:17.80	Mariam Sakr; Egypt	2:20.49
2019	Nour Elgendy; Egypt	2:18.21	Hamida Rania Nefsi; Algeria	2:20.33	Lia Lima; Angola	2:21.51

=== 200 m Individual Medley ===
Event	Gold		Silver		Bronze	
1973	Egypt; Faten Afifi		Egypt; Raouia Mansour		Zambia; Glenys Clark	
1987	Tunisia; Faten Ghattas		Madagascar; Bako Ratsifa		Tunisia; Senda Gharbi	
1991	Algeria; Insaf Hemmiche		Egypt; Rania Elwani		Tunisia; Selma Ben Gharbia	
1995	South Africa; Tracy-Lee Elliott		South Africa; Tania Oosthuizen		Zimbabwe; Mandy Leach	
1999	Mandy Loots; South Africa	2:20.02; GR	Kirsty Coventry; Zimbabwe	2:23.42	Mandy Leach; Zimbabwe	2:25.53
2003	Lize-Mari Retief; South Africa	2:21.64	Salama Ismail; Egypt	2:23.89	Bianca Meyer; South Africa	2:24.42
2007	Kirsty Coventry; Zimbabwe	2:13.02	Jessica Pengelly; South Africa	2:17.79	Sarra Lajnef; Tunisia	2:23.26
2011	Kirsty Coventry; Zimbabwe	2:13.70	Mandy Loots; South Africa	2:15.71	Katheryn Meaklim; South Africa	2:18.60
2015	Kirsty Coventry; Zimbabwe	2:16.05	Marlies Ross; South Africa	2:17.57	Rene Warnes; South Africa	2:18.98
2019	Jessica Whelan; South Africa	2:19.44	Hamida Rania Nefsi; Algeria	2:20.57	Christin Mundell; South Africa	2:21.70

=== 400 m Individual Medley ===
Event	Gold		Silver		Bronze	
1978	Tunisia; Myriam Mizouni		Algeria; Zaza Affane		Egypt; Meriem Farid	
1987	Tunisia; Faten Ghattas		Madagascar; Bako Ratsifa		Egypt; Nevine Morgan	
1991	Algeria; Insaf Hemmiche		Egypt; Nevine Morgan		Namibia; Frauke Bucking	
1995	South Africa; Tracy-Lee Elliott		South Africa; Tania Oosthuizen		Egypt; Lamia Fouad	
1999	Mandy Loots; South Africa	4:59.50; GR	Natalie du Toit; South Africa	5:06.62	Kenza Bennaceur; Algeria	5:29.60
2003	Bianca Meyer; South Africa	5:03.06	Shrone Austin; Seychelles	5:09.41	Kirsten van Heerden; South Africa	5:13.75
2007	Kirsty Coventry; Zimbabwe	4:39.91	Jessica Pengelly; South Africa	4:43.97	Katheryn Meaklim; South Africa	4.48.06
2011	Kirsty Coventry; Zimbabwe	4:44.34	Katheryn Meaklim; South Africa	4:46.33	Bianca Meyer; South Africa	4:51.20
2015	Hamida Rania Nefsi; Algeria	4:56.75	Souad Cherouati; Algeria	4:57.30	Rwioda Heshem; Egypt	4:58.88
2019	Samantha Randle; South Africa	4:55.31	Hamida Rania Nefsi; Algeria	4:58.55	Jessica Whelan; South Africa	5:01.35

=== 4x100 m Freestyle Relay ===
Event	Gold		Silver		Bronze	
1973	Egypt		Nigeria		Ghana	
1978	Tunisia		Egypt		Algeria	
1987	Tunisia		Egypt		Algeria	
1991	Mauritius		Egypt		Namibia	
1995	South Africa; Karen Allers; Marieke Theunissen; Marianne Kriel; Helene Muller		Zimbabwe; Shelley Dodd; Tanya Gurr; Mandy Leach; Teresa Moodie		Egypt; Noha El Ghazaly; Seremian Faiez; Nesreen Morgan; Rania Elwany	
1999	Zimbabwe; Kirsty Coventry, Tanya Gurr, Mandy Leach, Teresa Moody	3:53.45	South Africa; Charlene Wittstock, Stacey Bowley, Candice Crafford, Kim van Selm	3:54.31	Egypt	4:11.06
2003	South Africa	3:52.74	Egypt	4:04.68	Tunisia	4:04.68
2007	South Africa	3.56.05	Egypt	3.59.47	Tunisia	3.59.99
2011	South Africa; Karin Prinsloo; Natasha De Vos; Roxanne Tammadge; Suzaan van Biljon	3:53.93	Zimbabwe; Kirsty Coventry; Samantha Welch; Kirsten Lapham; Nicole Horn	3:57.81	Algeria; Fella Bennaceur; Malia Mghezzi Bekhouche; Sarah Hadj Abdelrahmane; Amel Melih	4:02.84
2015	South Africa; Marlies Ross (57.91); Jessica Ashley Cooper (57.14); Vannessa Mohr (58.50); Karin Prinsloo (55.49)	3:49.04	Egypt; Rowan El Badry (56.71); Salma Saber (58.43); Maii Atif (1:00.13); Farida Osman (55.03)	3:50.30	Tunisia; Rim Ouennich (59.61); Farah Ben Khelil (59.69); Asma Ben Boukhatem (1:01.15); Asma Sammoud (59.10)	3:59.55
2019	South Africa (RSA); Erin Gallagher (55.42); Jessica Whelan (58.83); Kerryn Herbst (58.32); Emma Chelius (56.31)	3:48.88; GR	Egypt (EGY); Amina Elsebelgy (59.00); Yasmin Hassan (59.11); Hania Moro (58.97); Farida Osman (56.45)	3:53.53	Algeria (ALG); Amel Melih (57.07) NR; Hamida Rania Nefsi (59.63); Sara El Tahawi (1:02.02); Majda Chebaraka (59.56)	3:58.28

=== 4x200 m Freestyle Relay ===
Event	Gold		Silver		Bronze	
1987	Tunisia		Zimbabwe		Egypt	
1991	Tunisia		Egypt		Zimbabwe	
1995	South Africa; Kirsten van Heerden; Marieke Theunissen; Tracy-Lee Elliott; Karen Allers		Egypt; Rania Elwany; Noha El Ghazaly; Seremian Faiez; Nesreen Morgan		Zimbabwe; Kirsten Smith; Mandy Leach; Teresa Moodie; Shelley Dodd	
1999	South Africa; Kirsten van Heerden, Stacey Bowley, Bronwyn Dedekind, Kim van Selm	8:36.76	Zimbabwe	8:47.56	Egypt	9:18.40
2003	South Africa	8:40.84	Egypt	8:45.18	Tunisia	9:53.35
2007	South Africa	8.28.46	Zimbabwe	8.38.20	Algeria	8.42.62
2011	South Africa; Roxanne Tammadge; Rene Warnes; Karin Prinsloo; Dominique Dryding	8:28.20	Zimbabwe; Kirsten Lapham; Nicole Horn; Samantha Welch; Kirsty Coventry	8:42.23	Algeria; Malia Mghezzi Bekhouche; Fella Bennaceur; Amel Melih; Sarah Hadj Abdelrahmane	8:57.78
2015	South Africa; Rene Warnes (2:04.51); Marlies Ross (2:06.57); Charlise Oberholzer (2:08.04); Karin Prinsloo (2:01.16)	8:20.28	Egypt; Roaia Mashaly (2:05.51); Salma Saber (2:06.64); Mariam Sakr (2:07.20); Rowan El Badry (2:11.19)	8:30.84	Algeria; Majda Chebaraka (2:03.89); Hamida Rania Nefsi (2:13.31); Souad Cherouati (2:08.26); Hannah Taleb Bendiab (2:09.65)	8:35.11
2019	South Africa (RSA); Christin Mundell (2:05.98); Jessica Whelan (2:08.07); Carla Antonopoulos (2:09.67); Erin Gallagher (2:06.85)	8:30.57	Egypt (EGY); Nour Elgendy (2:12.37); Logaine Abdellatif (2:10.35); Farida Samra (2:09.24); Hania Moro (2:08.33)	8:40.29	Algeria (ALG); Majda Chebaraka (2:08.34); Amel Melih (2:07.99); Sara El Tahawi (2:16.42); Hamida Rania Nefsi (2:10.00)	8:42.75

=== 4x100 m Medley Relay ===
Event	Gold		Silver		Bronze	
1973	Egypt		Nigeria		Ghana	
1978	Tunisia		Egypt		Algeria	
1987	Tunisia		Algeria		Zimbabwe	
1991	Zimbabwe; Sarah Murphy; Joanna Dorward; Carolyn Zwonkoff; Storme Moodie		Egypt		Algeria; Insaf Hemmiche; Mahdia Bella; Mahdia Mohamedi; Nawal Ferhat	
1995	South Africa; Helene Muller; Penny Heyns; Marianne Kriel; Mandy Loots		Zimbabwe; Linnelle Tannock; Tanya Gurr; Mandy Leach; Teresa Moodie		Egypt; Rania Elwany; Seremian Faiez; Lamia Fouad; Noha El Ghazaly	
1999	South Africa; Charlene Wittstock, Penny Heyns, Mandy Loots, Stacey Bowley	4:11.57; GR	Zimbabwe	4:28.96	Egypt	4:48.17
2003	South Africa	4:11.37	Egypt	4:31.84	Tunisia	4:37.84
2007	South Africa	4:10.90	Zimbabwe	4:21.60	Algeria	4:24.54; NR
2011	South Africa; Karin Prinsloo; Suzaan van Biljon; Mandy Loots; Natasha De Vos	4:14.00	Zimbabwe; Kirsten Lapham; Samantha Welch; Kirsty Coventry; Nicole Horn	4:24.01	Algeria; Amel Melih; Malia Mghezzi Bekhouche; Sarah Hadj Abdelrahmane; Fella Bennaceur	4:29.29
2015	South Africa; Jessica Ashley Cooper (1:03.26); Tatjana Schoenmaker (1:11.07); Vannessa Mohr (1:02.10); Karin Prinsloo (55.93)	4:12.36	Egypt; Mariam Sakr (1:07.44); Maii Atif (1:11.10); Farida Osman (59.72); Rowan El Badry (56.92)	4:15.18	Tunisia; Rim Ouennich (1:06.57); Farah Ben Khelil (1:16.88); Asma Sammoud (1:04.68); Asma Ben Boukhatem (1:02.51)	4:29.64
2019	South Africa (RSA); Kerryn Herbst (1:04.40); Kaylene Corbett (1:10.88); Erin Gallagher (1:00.27); Emma Chelius (56.87)	4:12.42	Egypt (EGY); Rola Hussein (1:05.96); Sarah Soliman (1:13.53); Farida Osman (1:00.94); Hania Moro (59.64)	4:20.07	Kenya (KEN); Sylvia Brunlehner (1:06.94); Rebecca Kamau (1:13.87); Emily Muteti (1:02.80); Maria Brunlehner (58.11)	4:21.72
