= Swimming at the 1992 Summer Olympics – Women's 100 metre backstroke =

Women's 100 metre backstroke at the Games of the XXV Olympiad
- Venue: Piscines Bernat Picornell
- Date: 28 July 1992 (heats & finals)
- Competitors: 46 from 32 nations
- Winning time: 1:00.68 OR

Medalists
1st place, gold medalist(s)		Krisztina Egerszegi	Hungary
2nd place, silver medalist(s)		Tünde Szabó	Hungary
3rd place, bronze medalist(s)		Lea Loveless	United States

The women's 100 metre backstroke event at the 1992 Summer Olympics took place on 28 July at the Piscines Bernat Picornell in Barcelona, Spain.

== Records ==
Prior to this competition, the existing world and Olympic records were as follows.

World record	Krisztina Egerszegi (HUN)	1:00.31	Athens, Greece	22 August 1991
Olympic record	Rica Reinisch (GDR)	1:00.86	Moscow, Soviet Union	23 July 1980

The following records were established during the competition:

Date	Round	Name	Nationality	Time	Record
28 July	Heat 6	Krisztina Egerszegi	Hungary	1:00.85	OR
28 July	Final A	Krisztina Egerszegi	Hungary	1:00.68	OR

== Results ==
=== Heats ===
Rule: The eight fastest swimmers advance to final A (Q), while the next eight to final B (q).

Rank	Heat	Lane	Name	Nationality	Time	Notes
1	6	4	Krisztina Egerszegi	Hungary	1:00.85	Q, OR
2	6	5	Lea Loveless	United States	1:01.19	Q
3	4	4	Tünde Szabó	Hungary	1:02.14	Q
4	5	3	Nina Zhivanevskaya	Unified Team	1:02.25	Q
5	5	4	Janie Wagstaff	United States	1:02.29	Q
6	5	5	Nicole Stevenson	Australia	1:02.54	Q
7	6	3	Yoko Koikawa	Japan	1:02.83	Q
8	5	6	Joanne Meehan	Australia	1:02.84	Q
9	6	6	Silvia Poll	Costa Rica	1:02.88	q, NR
10	4	3	Sandra Völker	Germany	1:02.90	q
11	5	2	Anna Simcic	New Zealand	1:03.12	q
12	5	1	Marianne Kriel	South Africa	1:03.20	q
13	6	1	Noriko Inada	Japan	1:03.21	q
14	4	5	Dagmar Hase	Germany	1:03.35	q
15	4	7	Nikki Dryden	Canada	1:03.71	q
16	4	1	He Cihong	China	1:03.83	q
17	6	2	Ellen Elzerman	Netherlands	1:03.96	
18	3	2	Akiko Thomson	Philippines	1:04.32	NR
19	4	8	Joanne Deakins	Great Britain	1:04.38	
20	6	8	Claudia Stănescu	Romania	1:04.44	
21	4	2	Eva Gysling	Switzerland	1:04.50	
22	2	7	Jill Brukman	South Africa	1:04.57	
23	5	8	Lorenza Vigarani	Italy	1:04.65	
24	6	7	Katherine Read	Great Britain	1:04.97	
25	3	3	Lara Bianconi	Italy	1:05.02	
26	5	7	Natalya Shibayeva	Unified Team	1:05.08	
27	3	4	Núria Castelló	Spain	1:05.09	
28	4	6	Julie Howard	Canada	1:05.26	
29	2	5	Małgorzata Galwas	Poland	1:05.36	NR
30	3	5	Helena Straková	Czechoslovakia	1:05.38	
31	3	6	Martina Moravcová	Czechoslovakia	1:05.73	
32	2	3	Céline Bonnet	France	1:05.75	
32	2	2	Nathalie Wunderlich	Switzerland	1:05.75	
34	3	8	Rita Jean Garay	Puerto Rico	1:05.92	NR
35	2	1	Lee Chang-ha	South Korea	1:06.08	
36	3	7	Ana Barros	Portugal	1:06.11	
37	3	1	Mariya Kocheva	Bulgaria	1:06.17	
38	2	4	Diane Lacombe	France	1:06.31	
39	1	5	Anne Lackman	Finland	1:06.48	
40	1	1	Darija Alauf	Independent Olympic Participants	1:06.81	NR
41	2	6	Tanja Godina	Slovenia	1:06.97	
42	1	4	Sarah-Jane Murphy	Zimbabwe	1:07.47	
43	1	6	Storme Moodie	Zimbabwe	1:07.60	
44	1	3	Ana Joselina Fortin	Honduras	1:08.24	
45	1	2	Rania Elwani	Egypt	1:10.12	
	1	7	Sharon Pickering	Fiji	DNS	

=== Finals ===
==== Final B ====
Rank	Lane	Name	Nationality	Time	Notes
9	7	Dagmar Hase	Germany	1:02.93	
10	6	Marianne Kriel	South Africa	1:03.12	
11	3	Anna Simcic	New Zealand	1:03.30	
12	2	Noriko Inada	Japan	1:03.42	
13	8	He Cihong	China	1:03.50	
14	1	Nikki Dryden	Canada	1:03.50	
15	4	Silvia Poll	Costa Rica	1:03.57	
16	5	Sandra Völker	Germany	1:04.52	

==== Final A ====
Rank	Lane	Name	Nationality	Time	Notes
1st place, gold medalist(s)	4	Krisztina Egerszegi	Hungary	1:00.68	OR
2nd place, silver medalist(s)	3	Tünde Szabó	Hungary	1:01.14	
3rd place, bronze medalist(s)	5	Lea Loveless	United States	1:01.43	
4	7	Nicole Stevenson	Australia	1:01.78	OC
5	2	Janie Wagstaff	United States	1:01.81	
6	8	Joanne Meehan	Australia	1:02.07	
7	6	Nina Zhivanevskaya	Unified Team	1:02.36	
8	1	Yoko Koikawa	Japan	1:03.23	
