= Swimming at the 1992 Summer Olympics – Women's 200 metre individual medley =

Women's 200 metre individual medley at the Games of the XXV Olympiad
- Venue: Piscines Bernat Picornell
- Date: 30 July 1992 (heats & finals)
- Competitors: 44 from 32 nations
- Winning time: 2:11.65 WR

Medalists
1st place, gold medalist(s)		Lin Li	China
2nd place, silver medalist(s)		Summer Sanders	United States
3rd place, bronze medalist(s)		Daniela Hunger	Germany

The women's 200 metre individual medley event at the 1992 Summer Olympics took place on 30 July at the Piscines Bernat Picornell in Barcelona, Spain.

== Records ==
Prior to this competition, the existing world and Olympic records were as follows.

World record	Ute Geweniger (GDR)	2:11.73	Magdeburg, East Germany	4 July 1981
Olympic record	Daniela Hunger (GDR)	2:12.59	Seoul, South Korea	24 September 1988

The following records were established during the competition:

Date	Round	Name	Nationality	Time	Record
30 July	Final A	Lin Li	China	2:11.65	WR

== Results ==
=== Heats ===
Rule: The eight fastest swimmers advance to final A (Q), while the next eight to final B (q).

Rank	Heat	Lane	Name	Nationality	Time	Notes
1	6	4	Summer Sanders	United States	2:14.68	Q
2	6	2	Elli Overton	Australia	2:15.13	Q, OC
3	6	5	Daniela Hunger	Germany	2:15.16	Q
4	5	4	Lin Li	China	2:15.68	Q
5	5	5	Marianne Limpert	Canada	2:16.84	Q
6	3	6	Ewa Synowska	Poland	2:16.88	Q, NR
7	5	3	Yelena Dendeberova	Unified Team	2:17.13	Q
8	6	3	Nancy Sweetnam	Canada	2:17.26	Q
9	4	4	Nicole Haislett	United States	2:17.40	q, WD
10	4	1	Jana Haas	Germany	2:17.74	q
11	4	5	Jacqueline McKenzie	Australia	2:17.82	q
12	4	8	Alicja Pęczak	Poland	2:17.90	q
13	3	5	Silvia Parera	Spain	2:17.97	q
14	6	6	Noemi Lung	Romania	2:18.12	q
15	4	3	Hideko Hiranaka	Japan	2:18.13	q
16	4	2	Eri Kimura	Japan	2:18.63	q
17	5	6	Louise Karlsson	Sweden	2:18.75	q, WD
18	6	7	Céline Bonnet	France	2:18.95	q
19	6	8	Mildred Muis	Netherlands	2:19.10	
20	4	6	Lara Bianconi	Italy	2:19.40	
21	4	7	Sharron Davies	Great Britain	2:19.41	
22	3	4	Hana Černá	Czechoslovakia	2:19.93	
23	5	7	Lü Bin	China	2:20.12	
24	5	1	Lenka Maňhalová	Czechoslovakia	2:20.52	
25	6	1	Brigitte Becue	Belgium	2:21.98	
26	5	8	Helen Slatter	Great Britain	2:22.04	
27	3	3	Martina Nemec	Austria	2:22.63	
28	2	4	Jill Brukman	South Africa	2:23.07	
29	2	2	Nathalie Wunderlich	Switzerland	2:23.18	
30	2	6	Praphalsai Minpraphal	Thailand	2:23.24	NR
31	3	2	Lourdes Becerra	Spain	2:23.51	
32	2	5	Michelle Smith	Ireland	2:23.83	NR
33	2	3	Joscelin Yeo	Singapore	2:25.32	
34	2	1	Claudia Fortin	Honduras	2:25.66	
35	3	7	Annette Poulsen	Denmark	2:25.67	
36	2	7	May Ooi	Singapore	2:27.62	
37	3	1	Keren Regal	Israel	2:27.85	
38	1	5	Jennifer Smatt	Bermuda	2:29.29	
39	1	4	Ana Joselina Fortin	Honduras	2:30.07	
40	1	2	Sharon Pickering	Fiji	2:30.11	
41	1	3	Nguyễn Kiều Oanh	Vietnam	2:35.71	
42	1	6	Tammie Kaae	Guam	2:36.31	
43	1	7	Elke Talma	Seychelles	2:53.41	
	1	1	Bako Ratsifandrihamanana	Madagascar	DNS	

=== Finals ===
==== Final B ====
Rank	Lane	Name	Nationality	Time	Notes
9	7	Hideko Hiranaka	Japan	2:18.47	
10	6	Silvia Parera	Spain	2:18.53	
11	3	Alicja Pęczak	Poland	2:18.55	
12	1	Eri Kimura	Japan	2:18.91	
13	2	Noemi Lung	Romania	2:18.97	
14	8	Céline Bonnet	France	2:19.14	
15	5	Jacqueline McKenzie	Australia	2:19.41	
16	4	Jana Haas	Germany	2:20.94	

==== Final A ====
Rank	Lane	Name	Nationality	Time	Notes
1st place, gold medalist(s)	6	Lin Li	China	2:11.65	WR
2nd place, silver medalist(s)	4	Summer Sanders	United States	2:11.91	AM
3rd place, bronze medalist(s)	3	Daniela Hunger	Germany	2:13.92	
4	1	Yelena Dendeberova	Unified Team	2:15.47	
5	5	Elli Overton	Australia	2:15.76	
6	2	Marianne Limpert	Canada	2:17.09	
7	8	Nancy Sweetnam	Canada	2:17.13	
8	7	Ewa Synowska	Poland	2:18.85	
