= Swimming at the 1992 Summer Olympics – Women's 400 metre individual medley =

Women's 400 metre individual medley at the Games of the XXV Olympiad
- Venue: Piscines Bernat Picornell
- Date: 26 July 1992 (heats & finals)
- Competitors: 32 from 21 nations
- Winning time: 4:36.54 NR

Medalists
1st place, gold medalist(s)		Krisztina Egerszegi	Hungary
2nd place, silver medalist(s)		Lin Li	China
3rd place, bronze medalist(s)		Summer Sanders	United States

The women's 400 metre individual medley event at the 1992 Summer Olympics took place on 26 July 1992 at the Piscines Bernat Picornell in Barcelona, Spain.

== Records ==
Prior to this competition, the existing world and Olympic records were as follows.

World record	Petra Schneider (GDR)	4:36.10	Guayaquil, Ecuador	1 August 1982
Olympic record	Petra Schneider (GDR)	4:36.29	Moscow, Soviet Union	26 July 1980

== Results ==
=== Heats ===
Rule: The eight fastest swimmers advance to final A (Q), while the next eight to final B (q).

Rank	Heat	Lane	Name	Nationality	Time	Notes
1	4	4	Krisztina Egerszegi	Hungary	4:43.83	Q
2	2	4	Summer Sanders	United States	4:43.95	Q
3	3	4	Lin Li	China	4:45.74	Q
4	2	6	Ewa Synowska	Poland	4:46.00	Q, NR
5	3	6	Eri Kimura	Japan	4:46.17	Q, NR
6	2	3	Hayley Lewis	Australia	4:46.57	Q
7	3	5	Daniela Hunger	Germany	4:47.39	Q
8	3	3	Hideko Hiranaka	Japan	4:47.92	Q
9	2	5	Beatrice Câșlaru	Romania	4:48.12	q
10	4	5	Erika Hansen	United States	4:48.13	q
11	4	2	Jana Haas	Germany	4:49.93	q
12	4	1	Silvia Parera	Spain	4:50.16	q
13	4	6	Jacqueline McKenzie	Australia	4:51.80	q
14	2	2	Hana Černá	Czechoslovakia	4:52.21	q
15	4	3	Nancy Sweetnam	Canada	4:52.41	q
16	3	2	Joanne Malar	Canada	4:52.85	q
17	1	3	Phillippa Langrell	New Zealand	4:53.62	NR
18	3	8	Noemi Lung	Romania	4:53.91	
19	2	7	Céline Bonnet	France	4:54.70	
20	4	7	Yan Ming	China	4:54.93	
21	2	1	Sharron Davies	Great Britain	4:56.44	
22	3	1	Elisenda Pérez	Spain	4:56.78	
23	3	7	Helen Slatter	Great Britain	4:58.24	
24	4	8	Marta Włodkowska	Poland	4:58.30	
25	1	4	Jeanine Steenkamp	South Africa	4:58.48	
26	1	5	Michelle Smith	Ireland	4:58.94	
27	1	2	Jill Brukman	South Africa	5:03.34	
28	1	6	Praphalsai Minpraphal	Thailand	5:04.95	
29	1	7	Keren Regal	Israel	5:07.97	
30	1	8	May Ooi	Singapore	5:08.19	
31	1	1	Claudia Fortin	Honduras	5:09.84	
	2	8	Britta Vestergaard	Denmark	DSQ	

=== Finals ===
==== Final B ====
Rank	Lane	Name	Nationality	Time	Notes
9	3	Jana Haas	Germany	4:47.74	
10	5	Erika Hansen	United States	4:48.37	
11	8	Joanne Malar	Canada	4:48.52	
12	6	Silvia Parera	Spain	4:48.77	
13	1	Nancy Sweetnam	Canada	4:50.17	
14	7	Hana Černá	Czechoslovakia	4:50.30	
15	4	Beatrice Câșlaru	Romania	4:50.60	
16	2	Jacqueline McKenzie	Australia	4:52.04	

==== Final A ====
Rank	Lane	Name	Nationality	Time	Notes
1st place, gold medalist(s)	4	Krisztina Egerszegi	Hungary	4:36.54	NR
2nd place, silver medalist(s)	3	Lin Li	China	4:36.73	AS
3rd place, bronze medalist(s)	5	Summer Sanders	United States	4:37.58	
4	7	Hayley Lewis	Australia	4:43.75	
5	8	Hideko Hiranaka	Japan	4:46.24	
6	1	Daniela Hunger	Germany	4:47.57	
7	2	Eri Kimura	Japan	4:47.78	
8	6	Ewa Synowska	Poland	4:53.32	
