= Swimming at the 1992 Summer Olympics – Women's 4 × 100 metre medley relay =

Women's 4 × 100 metre medley relay at the Games of the XXV Olympiad
- Venue: Piscines Bernat Picornell
- Date: 30 July 1992 (heats & final)
- Competitors: 78 from 17 nations
- Teams: 17
- Winning time: 4:02.54 WR

Medalists
1st place, gold medalist(s)		Lea Loveless, Anita Nall, Crissy Ahmann-Leighton, Jenny Thompson, Janie Wagstaff*, Megan Kleine*, Summer Sanders*, Nicole Haislett*	United States
2nd place, silver medalist(s)		Dagmar Hase, Jana Dörries, Franziska van Almsick, Daniela Hunger, Daniela Brendel*, Bettina Ustrowski*, Simone Osygus*	Germany
3rd place, bronze medalist(s)		Nina Zhivanevskaya, Yelena Rudkovskaya, Olga Kirichenko, Natalya Meshcheryakova, Yelena Shubina*; *Indicates the swimmer only competed in the preliminary heats.	Unified Team

The women's 4 × 100 metre medley relay event at the 1992 Summer Olympics took place on 30 July 1992 at the Piscines Bernat Picornell in Barcelona, Spain.

== Records ==
Prior to this competition, the existing world and Olympic records were as follows.

World record	East Germany (GDR); Ina Kleber (1:00.59); Sylvia Gerasch (1:08.69); Ines Geißler (59.52); Birgit Meineke (54.89)	4:03.69	Moscow, Soviet Union	24 August 1984
Olympic record	East Germany; Kristin Otto (1:01.03); Silke Hörner (1:08.20); Birte Weigang (59.51); Katrin Meissner (55.00)	4:03.74	Seoul, South Korea	24 September 1988

The following new world and Olympic records were set during this competition.

Date	Event	Name	Nationality	Time	Record
30 July	Final	Lea Loveless (1:00.82); Anita Nall (1:08.67); Crissy Ahmann-Leighton (58.58); Jenny Thompson (54.47)	United States	4:02.54	WR

== Results ==
=== Heats ===
Rule: The eight fastest teams advance to the final (Q).

Rank	Heat	Lane	Nation	Swimmers	Time	Notes
1	1	4	Unified Team	Nina Zhivanevskaya (1:02.24); Yelena Rudkovskaya (1:10.04); Olga Kirichenko (1:01.55); Yelena Shubina (56.54)	4:10.37	Q
2	1	5	Germany	Dagmar Hase (1:02.67); Daniela Brendel (1:10.27); Bettina Ustrowski (1:01.93); Simone Osygus (55.75)	4:10.62	Q
3	3	4	United States	Janie Wagstaff (1:03.19); Megan Kleine (1:12.05); Summer Sanders (1:00.15); Nicole Haislett (55.44)	4:10.83	Q
4	1	3	Netherlands	Ellen Elzerman (1:04.19); Kira Bulten (1:10.84); Inge de Bruijn (1:00.64); Marianne Muis (55.58)	4:11.25	Q
5	3	3	Japan	Yoko Koikawa (1:02.81); Kyoko Iwasaki (1:11.11); Yoko Kando (1:01.14); Suzu Chiba (56.42)	4:11.48	Q, NR
6	2	5	Canada	Nikki Dryden (1:03.96); Guylaine Cloutier (1:10.16); Kristin Topham (1:01.06); Andrea Nugent (56.49)	4:11.67	Q
7	2	4	Australia	Joanne Meehan (1:03.70); Samantha Riley (1:10.83); Susie O'Neill (1:01.28); Lisa Curry (56.73)	4:12.54	Q
8	3	5	China	He Cihong (1:04.48); Lou Xia (1:10.47); Qian Hong (1:00.82); Le Jingyi (56.78)	4:12.55	Q
9	3	2	Italy	Lorenza Vigarani (1:03.97); Manuela Dalla Valle (1:09.60); Ilaria Tocchini (1:01.67); Ilaria Sciorelli (57.53)	4:12.77	
10	2	3	Great Britain	Joanne Deakins (1:04.51); Suki Brownsdon (1:13.52); Madeleine Campbell (1:02.70); Karen Pickering (55.78)	4:16.51	
11	1	6	Denmark	Mette Jacobsen (1:04.06); Britta Vestergaard (1:12.58); Berit Puggaard (1:03.89); Gitta Jensen (56.67)	4:17.20	
12	2	2	Romania	Claudia Stănescu (1:04.90); Beatrice Câșlaru (1:13.35); Diana Ureche (1:02.51); Luminița Dobrescu (57.15)	4:17.91	
13	1	2	Spain	Núria Castelló (1:04.87); Rocío Ruiz (1:12.86); María Peláez (1:03.54); Claudia Franco (58.00)	4:19.27	
14	3	6	France	Céline Bonnet (1:05.73); Audrey Guerit (1:12.90); Jacqueline Delord (1:05.10); Julie Blaise (57.46)	4:21.19	
15	2	7	Finland	Anne Lackman (1:06.56); Riikka Ukkola (1:15.58); Marja Pärssinen (1:03.07); Minna Salmela (57.86)	4:23.07	
16	3	7	South Africa	Jill Brukman (1:05.78); Penny Heyns (1:14.43); Jeanine Steenkamp (1:06.19); Marianne Kriel (57.88)	4:24.28	
17	1	7	Mexico	Heike Koerner (1:06.77); Ana Mendoza (1:16.42); Gabriela Gaja (1:04.57); Laura Sánchez (58.97)	4:26.73	

=== Final ===
Rank	Lane	Nation	Swimmers	Time	Notes
1st place, gold medalist(s)	3	United States	Lea Loveless (1:00.82); Anita Nall (1:08.67); Crissy Ahmann-Leighton (58.58); Jenny Thompson (54.47)	4:02.54	WR
2nd place, silver medalist(s)	5	Germany	Dagmar Hase (1:01.61); Jana Dörries (1:09.43); Franziska van Almsick (59.08); Daniela Hunger (55.07)	4:05.19	
3rd place, bronze medalist(s)	4	Unified Team	Nina Zhivanevskaya (1:02.54); Yelena Rudkovskaya (1:07.44); Olga Kirichenko (1:00.98); Natalya Meshcheryakova (55.48)	4:06.44	
4	8	China	Lin Li (1:02.90); Lou Xia (1:09.51); Qian Hong (58.97); Le Jingyi (55.40)	4:06.78	AS
5	1	Australia	Nicole Stevenson (1:02.09); Samantha Riley (1:10.06); Susie O'Neill (59.38); Lisa Curry (55.48)	4:07.01	OC
6	7	Canada	Nikki Dryden (1:03.51); Guylaine Cloutier (1:09.55); Kristin Topham (1:00.38); Andrea Nugent (55.82)	4:09.26	
7	2	Japan	Yoko Koikawa (1:03.12); Kyoko Iwasaki (1:10.75); Yoko Kando (1:00.51); Suzu Chiba (55.54)	4:09.92	NR
8	6	Netherlands	Ellen Elzerman (1:03.81); Kira Bulten (1:11.30); Inge de Bruijn (1:00.39); Marianne Muis (55.37)	4:10.87	
