= Swimming at the 1992 Summer Olympics – Women's 200 metre breaststroke =

Women's 200 metre breaststroke at the Games of the XXV Olympiad
- Venue: Piscines Bernat Picornell
- Date: 27 July 1992 (heats & finals)
- Competitors: 40 from 29 nations
- Winning time: 2:26.65 OR

Medalists
1st place, gold medalist(s)		Kyoko Iwasaki	Japan
2nd place, silver medalist(s)		Lin Li	China
3rd place, bronze medalist(s)		Anita Nall	United States

The women's 200 metre breaststroke event at the 1992 Summer Olympics took place on 27 July at the Piscines Bernat Picornell in Barcelona, Spain.

== Records ==
Prior to this competition, the existing world and Olympic records were as follows.

World record	Anita Nall (USA)	2:25.35	Indianapolis, United States	2 March 1992
Olympic record	Silke Hörner (GDR)	2:26.71	Seoul, South Korea	21 September 1988

The following records were established during the competition:

Date	Round	Name	Nationality	Time	Record
27 July	Final A	Kyoko Iwasaki	Japan	2:26.65	OR

== Results ==
=== Heats ===
Rule: The eight fastest swimmers advance to final A (Q), while the next eight to final B (q).

Rank	Heat	Lane	Name	Nationality	Time	Notes
1	5	4	Anita Nall	United States	2:27.77	Q
2	5	3	Kyoko Iwasaki	Japan	2:27.78	Q, NR
3	3	6	Yelena Rudkovskaya	Unified Team	2:28.24	Q
4	5	5	Guylaine Cloutier	Canada	2:29.01	Q
5	5	2	Nathalie Giguère	Canada	2:29.71	Q
6	5	6	Lin Li	China	2:29.99	Q
7	3	3	Manuela Dalla Valle	Italy	2:30.75	Q
8	4	2	Alicja Pęczak	Poland	2:30.78	Q, NR
9	4	4	Jill Johnson	United States	2:30.80	q
10	5	8	Gabriella Csépe	Hungary	2:32.04	q, NR
11	3	4	Samantha Riley	Australia	2:32.09	q
11	4	7	Daniela Brendel	Germany	2:32.09	q
13	4	5	Audrey Guérit	France	2:32.33	q
14	3	5	Yelena Volkova	Unified Team	2:32.39	q
15	3	2	Kyoko Kasuya	Japan	2:32.55	q
16	3	8	Magdalena Kupiec	Poland	2:33.92	q
17	3	7	Brigitte Becue	Belgium	2:34.11	
18	3	1	Jana Dörries	Germany	2:34.58	
19	4	3	Linley Frame	Australia	2:34.73	
20	4	6	Beatrice Câșlaru	Romania	2:34.97	
21	2	3	Britta Vestergaard	Denmark	2:35.28	
21	4	8	Suki Brownsdon	Great Britain	2:35.28	
23	4	1	Park Mi-yeong	South Korea	2:35.33	
24	5	1	Elena Donati	Italy	2:36.42	
25	1	4	Martina Nemec	Austria	2:36.65	
26	2	7	Kira Bulten	Netherlands	2:37.09	
27	2	4	Ragnheiður Runólfsdóttir	Iceland	2:37.42	
28	2	5	Lourdes Becerra	Spain	2:37.69	
29	5	7	Lu Di	China	2:38.63	
30	2	2	Sornsawan Phuvichit	Thailand	2:41.20	
31	2	6	Martine Janssen	Netherlands	2:41.48	
32	1	5	Jennifer Smatt	Bermuda	2:42.25	
33	2	1	Jaime King	Great Britain	2:44.49	
34	2	8	Penny Heyns	South Africa	2:45.04	
35	1	2	Priscilla Madero	Ecuador	2:46.79	
36	1	3	Barbara Pexa	Guam	2:47.27	
37	1	6	Claudia Velásquez	Peru	2:47.31	
38	1	7	Nguyễn Thị Phương	Vietnam	2:57.71	
39	1	1	Elke Talma	Seychelles	3:12.13	
	1	8	Bako Ratsifandrihamanana	Madagascar	DNS	

=== Finals ===
==== Final B ====
Rank	Lane	Name	Nationality	Time	Notes
1	5	Gabriella Csépe	Hungary	2:31.15	NR
2	6	Daniela Brendel	Germany	2:32.05	
3	2	Audrey Guérit	France	2:32.10	
4	3	Samantha Riley	Australia	2:32.63	
5	1	Kyoko Kasuya	Japan	2:32.97	
6	4	Jill Johnson	United States	2:33.89	
7	8	Magdalena Kupiec	Poland	2:35.74	
8	7	Yelena Volkova	Unified Team	2:37.65	

=== Final A ===
Rank	Lane	Name	Nationality	Time	Notes
1st place, gold medalist(s)	5	Kyoko Iwasaki	Japan	2:26.65	OR, NR
2nd place, silver medalist(s)	7	Lin Li	China	2:26.85	NR
3rd place, bronze medalist(s)	4	Anita Nall	United States	2:26.88	
4	3	Yelena Rudkovskaya	Unified Team	2:28.47	
5	6	Guylaine Cloutier	Canada	2:29.88	
6	2	Nathalie Giguère	Canada	2:30.11	
7	1	Manuela Dalla Valle	Italy	2:31.21	
8	8	Alicja Pęczak	Poland	2:31.76	
