= Ratsifa =

Ratsifa is a surname, notably in Madagascar, and among the Malagasy people. Notable people with the surname include:

- Bako Ratsifa (born 1964), Malagasy swimmer, sister of Vola
- Vola Hanta Ratsifa Andrihamanana (born 1970), Malagasy swimmer
