= Jill Johnson (swimmer) =

American swimmer (born 1969)

Personal information
- Full name: Jill Kristen Johnson
- National team: United States
- Born: June 8, 1969 (age 57) Lutherville, Maryland
- Occupation: Attorney
- Height: 5 ft 8 in (1.73 m)
- Weight: 146 lb (66 kg)
- Spouse: Michael Alan Chasson (1995)
- Children: 2

Sport
- Sport: Swimming
- Strokes: Breaststroke
- Club: North Baltimore Aquatic Club
- College team: Stanford University
- Coach: Murray Stephens (Baltimore AC); G. Haines, Skip Kenney (Stanford); Mike Chasson (Stanford)

Jill Kristen Johnson (born June 8, 1969), later known by her married name Jill Chasson after 1995, is an American former competition swimmer who competed for Stanford University and participated in the 200-meter breaststroke at the 1992 Summer Olympics in Barcelona, Spain.

== Early life ==
Johnson was born June 8, 1969 in Lutherville, Maryland to Calvert Knorr Johnson and Penelope McMullan Johnson. By the age of seven, she was competing regularly, and soon was training with and representing the Padonia Summer team and the North Baltimore Aquatic Club where she was coached by Murray Stephens. She graduated greater Baltimore's Dulaney High School in the summer of 1986, with a class rank of 5th out of 450 students. In her High School career, Johnson set 14 Central Maryland Swim League records, 14 team records, and seven pool records.

In the summer after her Senior year, she won the 100-meter IM, the 50 backstroke, and the 50 breaststroke for the 15-18 age group at the Central Maryland Swim League Championships on July 30 in Padonia. Johnson applied too late to receive a full athletic scholarship to Stanford, but got a partial scholarship for her academic ability. Swimming for the North Baltimore Aquatic Club at the August, 1986, U.S. Swimming National Championships she placed third in the 200 breaststroke, leading the team to a sixth place finish overall.

== Stanford University ==
Johnson competed for Stanford University during her college years, beginning in the Fall of 1986. Improving steadily, as a Stanford Freshman, Johnson placed seventh in her signature event, the 200-yard breaststroke, and then placed sixth as a Sophomore. Continuing to train and improve, she placed second in both the 100 and the 200-yard breaststroke with a personal best time of (2:13.11) at the March, 1989 NCAA Championships as a Junior, helping to lead the team to the Championship that year, with Texas placing second. Training intensely, as a Senior in 1990 she captured the NCAA championship in the 200 breaststroke, serving as Co-captain and receiving a full athletic scholarship that year. Johnson was managed by Hall of Fame Coach George Haines at Stanford through 1988 and then by Skip Kenney. She credited Assistant Stanford Coach Mike Chasson with much of her progress.

== Competition ==
In 1990, Johnson swam at both the Goodwill Games and the World Championships, finishing fourth in both international meets in her specialty, the 200 breaststroke.

She captured a tenth place finish at the August, 1991 Pan Pacific Championships in Havana, Cuba.

Johnson qualified for the 1988 Olympic trials, but did not advance out of the preliminary heats.

== 1992 Barcelona Olympics ==
Johnson trained with Stanford Assistant Coach Mike Chasson for the 1992 Olympics, moving to the Sommerville, Massachusetts area and working as a waitress at a Harvard Square restaurant after Chasson became the Head Swim Coach at Harvard around 1991. She ranked second in the world in the 200 breaststroke in 1991, but interestingly her primarily rival in the event, Anita Nall was also a Baltimore Aquatic Club swimmer. At the March 1992 Olympic trials in Indianapolis, Johnson swam her best time of 2:27.96 for the 200-meter breaststroke in the preliminaries, and recorded a time of 2:28 placing second behind rival Anita Nall in the finals, despite the 15-year old Nall setting a world record in the event of 2:25.35.

Johnson competed in the B Final of the women's 200-meter breaststroke event, and finished with the fourteenth-best time overall (2:33.89). Kyoko Iwasaki of Japan took the gold that year at only 14 in a somewhat unexpected victory, Lin Li of China the silver, and Anita Nall of the United States, though a slight favorite initially, took the bronze with a time of 2:26.88.

=== Marriage ===
Johnson married her Olympic coach Mike Chasson in September 1995, after the Barcelona Olympics. After leaving his coaching stint at Harvard, Chasson would serve as the Head Coach at the University of Arizona beginning in 1998, through 2009, when he resigned to focus more time with the Sun Devils Aquatic Club. The couple would reside in the greater Phoenix area in Arizona after 1998.

=== Later life and career ===
Johnson attended and graduated Cum Laude from the Boston University School of Law in 1995 where she served as an Editor of the Law Review and worked for a period as a paralegal.

In 1995, in one of her first positions, Johnson-Chasson worked for the Boston firm of Roper and Grey. She used her Juris Doctor degree to act as the legal liaison for USA Swimming to the US Olympic Committee and also served on the Athlete’s Advisory Council of the US Olympic Committee, where she resigned around 2013. After joining in 2008, Johnson worked as an employment attorney at the firm of Coppersmith Brockelman and resided in Awatuckee, Arizona, outside Phoenix, where she performed a variety of duties including helping businesses follow laws and regulations regarding the workplace and dealing with complaints against businesses filed by U.S. government agencies.

== See also ==
- List of Stanford University people
