= Teresa Moodie =

Zimbabwean swimmer (born 1978)

Personal information
- Born: September 11, 1978 (age 47)

Sport
- Sport: Swimming
- College team: Lady Vols
Medal record
Representing Zimbabwe
African Games
Gold medal – first place	1999 Johannesburg	4x100m freestyle relay
Silver medal – second place	1995 Harare	4x100m freestyle relay
Silver medal – second place	1999 Johannesburg	100m freestyle
Silver medal – second place	1999 Johannesburg	4x200m freestyle relay
Silver medal – second place	1999 Johannesburg	4x100m medley relay
Bronze medal – third place	1995 Harare	4x200m freestyle relay
Bronze medal – third place	1999 Johannesburg	100m butterfly

Teresa Moodie (born 11 September 1978) is a former swimmer who competed internationally for Zimbabwe.

== Career ==
Moodie swam in the 1994 and 1998 Commonwealth Games, the 1996 Summer Olympic Games and the 1995 and 1999 All-Africa Games. She won a gold medal in the 4×100m free relay at the 1999 All-Africa Games, a silver medal in the 100m freestyle and a bronze in the 100m butterfly.

== Personal life ==
Moodie attended Vincennes University before going to the University of Tennessee. She was on the Lady Vols swimming team.

Her sister Storme represented Zimbabwe at the 1992 Summer Olympics in swimming.
