= Summer Sanders =

American swimmer (born 1972)

Summer Sanders OLY
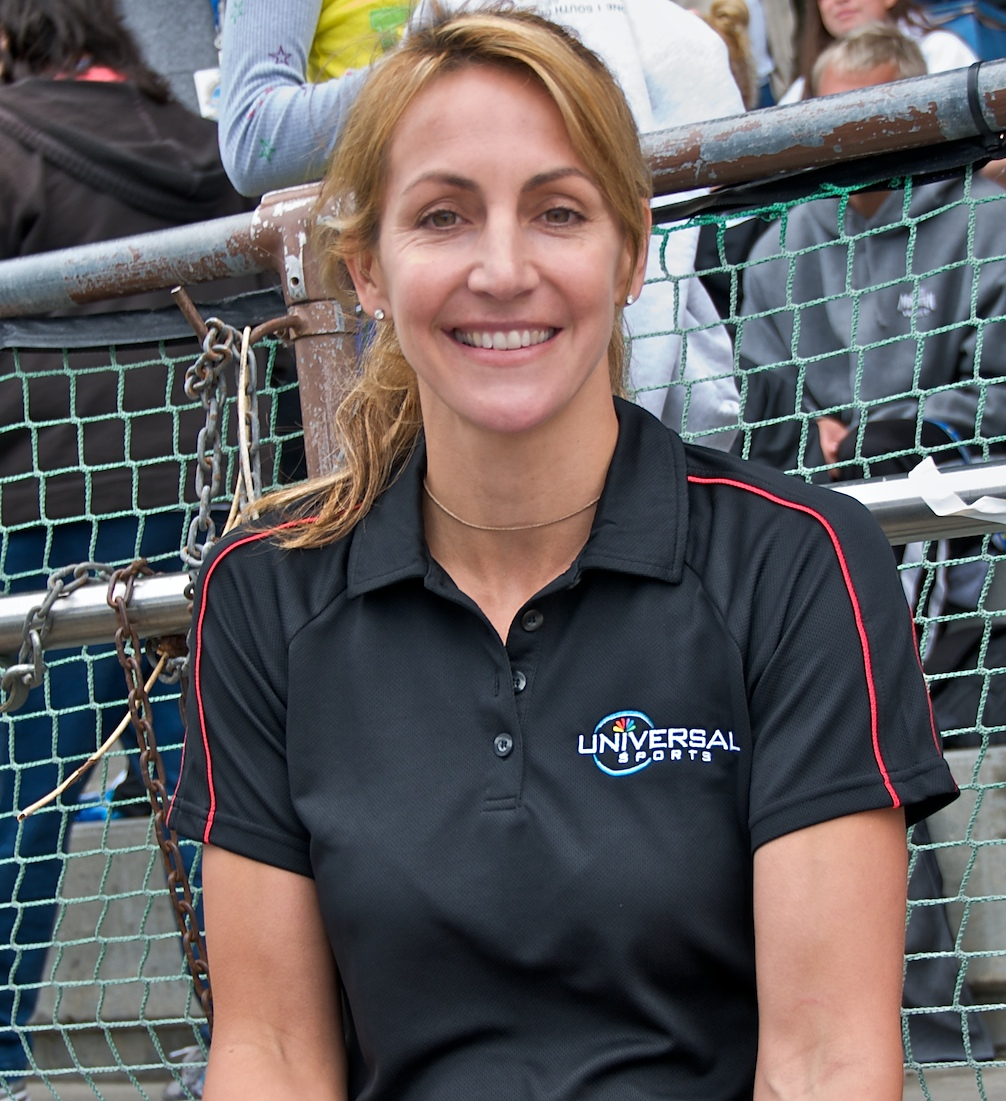
- Sanders in 2009

Personal information
- Full name: Summer Elisabeth Sanders
- National team: United States
- Born: October 13, 1972 (age 54) Roseville, California, U.S.
- Height: 5 ft 9 in (175 cm)
- Weight: 126 lb (57 kg)

Sport
- Sport: Swimming
- Strokes: Butterfly, individual medley
- Club: California Capital Aquatics
- College team: Stanford University
- Coach: Richard Quick; UT
Medal record
Event	1st	2nd	3rd
Olympic Games	2	1	1
World Championships (LC)	1	1	1
Pan Pacific Championships	3	1	0
Total	6	3	2
Women's Swimming
Representing United States
Olympic Games
Gold medal – first place	1992 Barcelona	200 m butterfly
Gold medal – first place	1992 Barcelona	4x100 m medley
Silver medal – second place	1992 Barcelona	200 m medley
Bronze medal – third place	1992 Barcelona	400 m medley
World Championships (LC)
Gold medal – first place	1991 Perth	200 m butterfly
Silver medal – second place	1991 Perth	200 m medley
Bronze medal – third place	1991 Perth	400 m medley
Pan Pacific Championships
Gold medal – first place	1991 Edmonton	200 m butterfly
Gold medal – first place	1991 Edmonton	200 m medley
Gold medal – first place	1991 Edmonton	400 m medley
Silver medal – second place	1989 Tokyo	200 m medley

Summer Elisabeth Sanders (born October 13, 1972) is an American sports commentator, reporter, television personality, actress, former competition swimmer and Olympic champion from 1992.

== Early life ==
Sanders was born in Roseville, California, and attended Cavitt Junior High School and Oakmont High School.

== Swimming career ==
By age three, Sanders could swim a lap of the pool. She wanted to be just like her older brother Trevor, so in 1976 she joined the Sugar Bears—an age-group swimming program in Roseville, California, coached by Mike Barsotti, Scott Winter and Scott O'Conner. From there she jumped to the Sierra Aquatic Club with coach Ralph Thomas, and finally to California Capital Aquatics under coach Mike Hastings.

At age 15, Sanders drew real attention from the swimming world when she barely missed earning a spot on the 1988 Olympic Team, finishing third in the 200-meter individual medley. In her first international meet, she won a silver medal in the 200 individual medley behind Lin Li of China at the 1989 Pan Pacific Championships. At the 1991 Pan Pacific Championships, she won the 400-meter individual medley (beating Lin Li) and the 200-meter butterfly.

In 1991, Sanders enrolled at Stanford University to swim under Hall of Fame coach Richard Quick. In her two-year collegiate swimming career, Sanders won eight NCAA National Championship titles, including the 200-yard butterfly, 200-yard individual medley and 400-yard individual medley and the 4x100-yard medley relay. She won back-to-back NCAA Swimmer of the Year titles and helped her Cardinal team win the 1992 NCAA National Championships. She was the recipient of the Honda Sports Award for Swimming and Diving, recognizing her as the outstanding college female swimmer of the year in 1991–92.

Sanders won three medals at the 1991 World Championships in Perth, Australia, taking gold in the 200-meter butterfly, silver in the 200-meter individual medley, and bronze in the 400-meter individual medley. She then became the first American woman since Hall of Famer Shirley Babashoff (1976) to qualify for four individual events at one Olympiad at the 1992 Olympic Trials.

At the 1992 Olympic Games in Barcelona, Spain, Sanders won four Olympic medals—gold in the 200-meter butterfly with a time of 2:08.67, gold in the 400-meter medley relay, silver in the 200-meter individual medley, and a bronze medal in the 400-meter individual medley.

== Achievements ==
- 1992 Olympic Games: gold (200m butterfly), gold (4 × 100 m medley relay – preliminary heat), silver (200m IM), bronze (400m IM), 6th (100m butterfly)
- 1991 World Championships: gold (200m butterfly), silver (200m IM), bronze (400m IM)
- 8 United States National Championships: 2-100y butterfly, 2-200y butterfly, 1-200y IM, 2-400y IM, 1-200m IM
- 9 NCAA National Championships: 2-200y butterfly, 2-200y IM, 2-400y IM, 1-4x50y medley relay, 1-4x100y medley relay, 1-4x100y freestyle relay
- 1991 Pan-Pacific Championships: gold (200m IM, 400m IM, 200m butterfly)
- 1989 Pan-Pacific Championships: silver (200m IM)

== Television work ==
Sanders began working on television while still competing. In 1992 and 1994 she was a commentator for CBS Sports for the NCAA Swimming Championships. In 1996, she was a commentator for NBC's coverage of swimming at the Atlanta Olympics. She acted as an Olympic analyst and host for NBC during the 1996, 2000, 2002 and 2010 Olympic Games, being a Today Show special contributor from 2000 to 2004 and contributed to the network's coverage of the 2002 Winter Olympics in Salt Lake City as an on-site reporter. She was also the host of Scholastic at the Olympic Games on MSNBC in 2000.

Sanders spent eight years co-hosting NBA Inside Stuff with Ahmad Rashad, being a sideline reporter for the WNBA (Lifetime, 1997–1999; NBC, 1999–2002) and a feature correspondent for NBA on NBC from 2000 to 2002. She covered tennis as a reporter for United States's coverage of the U.S. Open in 2000 and 2001, and was co-host of CBS' coverage of "Arthur Ashe Kid's Day" at the Open from 2000 to 2006.

Sanders has appeared in many programs as correspondent, co-host, and host. Highlights include Nickelodeon, who named her their "commissioner" for the Nick GAS channel in 1998, after being the first female host of a Nickelodeon game show, Figure It Out (1997–1999), co-hosting for MTV's Sandblast in 1994, and hosting the syndicated series US Olympic Gold (2002–2005), Beg, Borrow & Deal (ESPN, 2003), NBA TV's Mind, Body & Spirit (2003–2004) and The Sports List (Fox Sports Net, 2004–2005). Sanders also co-hosted the Fox celebrity reality series Skating With Celebrities in 2006.

In 2009, Sanders began hosting Inside Out with Summer Sanders. The show, which is the first original production of Universal Sports, debuted on December 23, 2009, and focuses on in-depth interviews and intimate profiles of notable Olympic athletes. She also worked as a general correspondent for Good Morning America and Rachael Ray.

She appeared on the third season of Celebrity Apprentice, and competed for charity. In January 2012, she was one of eight celebrities participating in the Food Network reality series Rachael vs. Guy: Celebrity Cook-Off.

Sanders hosted the award-winning "Elite Athlete Workouts" on Yahoo!Sports and covered the 2012 Olympic Games in London for the news outlet. She currently works as a commentator on the new Pac-12 Network.

Her most recent work in TV is hosting the game show Keywords for HLN.

== Other media ==
Sanders has appeared as an actress in two films: Jerry Maguire (1996), in which she played herself, and Broken Record (1997).

In June 1999, she published the book Champions Are Raised, Not Born: How My Parents Made Me A Success.

== Personal life ==
On July 4, 1997, Sanders married Olympic swimmer Mark Henderson. The couple divorced in 2001. In July 2005, she married Erik Schlopy, a World Cup skier who competed at the 2006 Winter Olympics. Sanders and Schlopy have two children. She is a noted fan of the NFL's Buffalo Bills; her husband is a native Western New Yorker whose cousin Todd Schlopy briefly played for the Bills in 1987.

On June 9, 2007, Sanders' childhood home was destroyed by a fire.

On September 19, 2025, an Amicus Brief was filed with the U.S. Supreme Court on behalf of Sanders and other athletes in support of a West Virginia law that prohibits biologically male athletes from participating in what the filing described as women's sports.

== See also ==
- List of Olympic medalists in swimming (women)
- List of Stanford University people
- List of World Aquatics Championships medalists in swimming (women)

Awards
Preceded by Janet Evans	Swimming World; American Swimmer of the Year; 1992	Succeeded by Jenny Thompson
