= Joanne Deakins =

British swimmer (born 1972)

Personal information
- Full name: Joanne Cara Deakins
- National team: Great Britain
- Born: 20 November 1972 (age 53) Worcester, England
- Height: 1.68 m (5 ft 6 in)
- Weight: 62 kg (137 lb; 9.8 st)

Sport
- Sport: Swimming
- Strokes: Backstroke
- Club: City of Coventry
Medal record
Women's swimming
Representing Great Britain
Universiade
Bronze medal – third place	1995 Fukuoka	200 m backstroke
Representing England
Commonwealth Games
Silver medal – second place	1990 Auckland	4×100 m medley

Joanne Cara Deakins (born 20 November 1972) is an English former competitive swimmer.

== Swimming career ==
Deakins specialised in the backstroke and represented Great Britain at the 1992 Olympic Games in Barcelona and the 1996 Olympic Games in Atlanta.

She represented England in the 100 metres and 200 metres backstroke and won a silver medal in the 4 x 100 metres medley relay, at the 1990 Commonwealth Games in Auckland, New Zealand. Four years later she swam in the 200 metres backstroke event at the 1994 Commonwealth Games and repeated the achievement a further four years later in her third Games, which was the 1998 Commonwealth Games. In addition to her Olympic and Commonwealth Games success she won the bronze medal in the 200 metres backstroke at the 1995 Universiade.

== International competitions ==
Year	Competition	Venue	Position	Event	Notes
Representing Great Britain / England
1990	Commonwealth Games	Auckland, New Zealand	4th	100 m backstroke	1:04.13
1990	Commonwealth Games	Auckland, New Zealand	4th	200 m backstroke	2:14.74
1990	Commonwealth Games	Auckland, New Zealand	2nd	4 × 100 m medley	4:11.88
1991	European Championships	Athens, Greece	5th	200 m backstroke	2:14.23
1992	Olympic Games	Barcelona, Spain	19th	100 m backstroke	1:04.38
1992	Olympic Games	Barcelona, Spain	10th	200 m backstroke	2:13.91
1992	Olympic Games	Barcelona, Spain	10th	4 × 100 m medley	4:16.51
1993	European Championships	Sheffield, England	8th	200 m backstroke	2:16.02
1994	Commonwealth Games	Victoria, Canada	9th	200 m backstroke	2:18.16
1995	Universiade	Fukuoka, Japan	3rd	200 m backstroke	2:15.82
1996	Olympic Games	Atlanta, United States	12th	200 m backstroke	2:14.50
1998	Commonwealth Games	Kuala Lumpur, Malaysia	6th	200 m backstroke	2:15.03
