= Nikki Dryden =

Canadian swimmer (born 1975)

Personal information
- Full name: Nicole Dryden
- National team: Canada
- Born: April 5, 1975 (age 51) Calgary, Alberta, Canada
- Occupation(s): Lawyer (human rights, immigration)
- Height: 1.88 m (6 ft 2 in)
- Weight: 72 kg (159 lb)

Sport
- Sport: Swimming
- Strokes: Backstroke, freestyle
- Club: Cohoes Swim Club/Island Swimming, Victoria; Manitoba Marlins
- College team: University of Florida; Brown University
- Coach: Howard Firby (1985-1986); Ron Jacks (Island Swimming)
Medal record
Women's swimming
Representing Canada
Pan American Games
Silver medal – second place	1991 Havana	100 m backstroke
Silver medal – second place	1991 Havana	200 m backstroke
Silver medal – second place	1991 Havana	4x200 m freestyle
Commonwealth Games
Bronze medal – third place	1994 Victoria	800 m freestyle

Nicole Dryden (born April 5, 1975) is a former competitive swimmer who represented Canada at two consecutive Summer Olympics. In her swimming career, she won 21 Canadian national titles and was a silver medalist in the 1991 Pan American Games. After completing a J.D. degree from Brooklyn Law School in 2005, she has practiced immigration and human rights law, initially in New York City.

== Early years ==
Dryden was born in Calgary, Alberta, in 1975, to Paula and Les Dryden. Her mother Paula, a nationally ranked Australian runner, would become part of the University of Victoria's physical education faculty. With Dryden's father Lou later serving as a vice-president at Camosun College, Dryden seemed destined for a future focused on academic achievement and athletics. In her earliest years she was coached by Hall of Fame Coach Howard Firby beginning around 1985 with the Juan de Fuca Cohoes Swim Club or the Victoria Olympians, both later associated with Island Swimming in Victoria. Firby coached the Cohoes and Olympians clubs from 1974 to 1986. By 1991, and earlier, already emerging as a national star, she competed in Victoria, and was coached by Canadian Hall of Fame Coach Ron Jacks with the Victoria Amateur Swim Club, also known as Island Swimming and the Victoria Olympians, where she swam at Victoria's Crystal Pool and Fitness Center. Jacks claimed to have been strongly influenced by Firby, who was considered a stroke specialist who studied aerodynamics and anatomy, and as a commercial artist often used drawings to illustrate what he wanted his swimmers to do. One of Dryden's teammates at Island swimming was Suzanne Weckend a world-rated backstroker. In 1993 she graduated Victoria's Mount Douglas Secondary School.

At the February 21-23, 1991 Winter Nationals in Calgary Dryden established a new Commonwealth and Canadian and Commonwealth record in the 200 backstroke with a time of 2:12.18, won the 100-meter backstroke, and placed third in both the 100 backstroke and the 400 freestyle events.

She won silver medals at the 1991 Pan American games in Havana in the 100 and 200-meter backstroke and the 4x200-meter freestyle relay. At the 1994, Commonwealth Games, she won the bronze medal in the 800-meter freestyle.

== 1992-1996 Olympics ==
At 17, and Canada's youngest swimmer at the 1992 Summer Olympics in Barcelona, Spain, Dryden reached the finals with the Canadian women's relay teams in the 4x100-metre freestyle relay where she placed eighth, and in the 4x100-metre medley relay where she placed sixth, again making the finals. In the individual women's 100-metre backstroke, Dryden advanced to the consolation final, finishing fourteenth overall; she also participated in qualifying heats of the women's 200-metre freestyle and the women's 200-metre backstroke.

At the 1996 Summer Olympics in Atlanta, Dryden placed 14th in the 800-meter freestyle with a time of 8:47.19. She attributed her performance partly to a lingering shoulder injury, and an overall lackluster year. At the Atlanta Olympics, she was managed by Canadian Olympic Head Coach Dave Johnson.

=== Collegiate swimming ===
Beginning in the fall of 1993, Dryden accepted a four-year athletic scholarship to attend the University of Florida in Gainesville, Florida, swimming only for two months under women's coach Mitch Ivey who left as coach in her freshman year, and then under men's and women's head coach Chris Martin. While attending Florida, she was a member of the Florida Gators swimming and diving team from 1993 to 1996. As a Gator swimmer she was a five-time Southeastern Conference (SEC) champion (twice in the 500-yard freestyle, twice in the 800-yard freestyle relay, and once in the 1,650-yard freestyle), and received nine All-American honors.

After 1996, she was a five-time Ivy League champion as a swimmer for the Brown Bears swimming team of Brown University in Providence, Rhode Island. Dryden graduated from Brown with a bachelor's degree in international relations in 1998. In 1998, she made First Team All Ivy in the 100 and 200-yard backstroke events.

Dryden has also trained with the Vancouver Pacific Dolphins, associated with the University of Vancouver. She swam in during her collegiate years for the Manitoba Marlins in Winnipeg, Manitoba, during her time away from the University of Florida, around 1996, while training for the 1996 Olympics.

== Life after competition swimming ==
Dryden earned her Juris Doctor degree from Brooklyn Law School in Brooklyn, New York, in 2005, and has worked as a human rights and immigration lawyer in the New York City office of Fragomen, Del Rey, Bernsen & Loewy. Dryden previously served as a visa officer for the Australian High Commission in Sri Lanka and Kenya, and worked for the International Organization for Migration with Somali immigration officials.

After completing her Juris Doctor from Brooklyn Law School, Dryden received a Professional Certificate in Arbitration from Adelaide Law School and was the recipient of a Fulbright Scholarship. She has studied for a PhD at Australia's University of New South Wales, and received her Fulbright Scholarship to continue studies at Sports Resolution UK, and the Sports Dispute Resolution Centre of Canada. In sports related legal work, she has had experience in the areas of rights for athletes, sex abuse, gender discrimination, and corruption in sporting organizations.

Dryden also volunteers as an athlete ambassador for several organizations that work to support the rights of children around the world, including Right To Play and SwimLanka. She is a celebrity swimmer for Swim Across America, a charitable organization that works with former Olympic swimmers to raise funds for cancer research.

== See also ==
- Florida Gators
- List of Brown University people
- List of University of Florida Olympians
- List of Commonwealth Games medallists in swimming (women)
