= Megan Kleine =

American swimmer

Personal information
- Full name: Megan Adelle Kleine
- National team: United States
- Born: December 22, 1974 (age 51) Dallas, Texas, U.S.
- Occupations: Business Major, banking
- Height: 5 ft 7 in (1.70 m)
- Weight: 106 lb (48 kg)
- Spouse: David Andrew Morris (m.2001)
- Children: 2

Sport
- Sport: Swimming
- Event: 100, 200 breaststroke
- Strokes: Breaststroke
- Club: Brookhill Swim Club; Wildcat Aquatics (Lexington, Ky.)
- College team: University of Texas
- Coach: Jill Sterkel (U. Texas)
Medal record
Women's swimming
Representing the United States
Olympic Games
Gold medal – first place	1992 Barcelona	4x100 m medley

Megan Adelle Kleine (born December 22, 1974), known by her married name after 2001 as Megan Morris, is an American former competition swimmer for the University of Texas and a 1992 Olympic gold medalist in the 4x100-meter medley relay.

== Early life and swimming ==
Kleine was born on December 22, 1974, in Dallas, Texas to Mr. and Mrs. Gary James Kleine. Megan began competitive swimming around the age of nine, and attended Lexington's Morton Middle School where at 14, she set a state age-group record in the 100-meter breaststroke with a time of 1:13.46. In May 1989 at 15, she swam for Brookhill Swim Club at the State A meet and won the 400 Individual Medley with a 4:36.02 and the 200-breaststroke with a time of 2:23.69. By 16, she swam for Wildcat Aquatics. She spent her High School years at Henry Clay High School, graduating in the Spring of 1993, and competed for their swim team where she was coached by Bob Young.

As a Sophomore, at the Kentucky State Swimming and Diving Championships, she defended her title as a State champion and won the 200-yard individual Medley and the 100-yard breaststroke for the second consecutive year. In her Junior year she became a Kentucky state champion for her third consecutive year breaking a five-year standing state record in the 100-yard breaststroke with a time of 1:03.34, and also winning the 200-yard Individual Medley with a time of 2:06.69. Her performance helped lead the Henry Clay girls team to a 3rd-place finish overall and helped secure Henry Clay's second combined team title, combining the score of the boys and girls teams.

== 1992 Barcelona Olympics ==
Though she was ranked 32nd in the world in the event the prior year, at the U.S. Olympic swimming trials in June 1992, in Indianapolis, Indiana, Kleine exceeded expectations and surprised the swimming community by swimming a personal best in the 100-meter breaststroke, placing second and recording a time of 1:10.88 to qualify for the Barcelona Olympics. She would become one of the few World class athletes to train almost exclusively in Kentucky.

At the 1992 Summer Olympics in Barcelona, Spain, she earned a gold medal by swimming the breaststroke leg for the winning U.S. team in the preliminary heats of the women's 4×100-meter medley relay where the American women swam a 4:02.54 in the finals, with the German team taking the silver medal. Individually, she also competed in the B Final of the women's 100-meter breaststroke event, and finished with the twelfth-best time overall of 1:11.07. That year, in what she considered her most memorable performances, Kleine would swim a personal best time in the 100-meter breast of 1:09.8.

After graduating Henry Clay in the Spring of 1993, she placed fourth in the Women's 200-meter breaststroke at the Philips 66 U.S. National Swimming Championship at the Texas Swimming Center.

At the 1996 Olympic trials, at the Indiana Natatorium, Megan placed 27th out of 33 entrants in the 100-meter breaststroke, failing to make the trial finals, and finished 5th in the 200-meter breaststroke. Sports historians in 1996 noted that in the breaststroke younger women competitors seemed to have an advantage in elite competition as fewer breaststrokers continued to improve their times past their college years. Megan served as a torchbearer for the 1996 Olympics, however.

=== University of Texas ===
She swam for the University of Texas, enrolling on a scholarship in the Fall of 1993, where she trained under Hallof Fame Head Women's Coach Jill Sterkel a former Olympic gold medalist and UT swimmer. As a former world class swimmer, Kleine was a two-time All American swimming for Texas, though she sat out one year of collegiate competition suffering from flu like symptoms. She graduated Texas in 1997 as a business major. In the summers during her time at U. Texas, she continued to train with the Wildcat Aquatics Club.

She retired from competitive swimming around the summer of 1997, after her senior year swimming at the University of Texas.

On the evening of May 12, 2001, she married David Andrew Morris of Houston at Maxwell Street Presbyterian Church in Lexington, Kentucky. Bride and groom both had family in Texas and were University of Texas graduates. At the time of her marriage, she was working for Southwest Bank of Texas. The couple lived in Houston, where they raised two daughters.

== See also ==
- List of Olympic medalists in swimming (women)
- List of University of Texas at Austin alumni
