= Bettina Ustrowski =

German swimmer (born 1976)

Personal information
- Born: July 27, 1976 (age 49) Berlin, West Germany

Sport
- Sport: Swimming
Medal record
Representing Germany
Olympic Games
Silver medal – second place	1992 Barcelona	4x100 m medley relay
European Championships
Gold medal – first place	1993 Sheffield	4x100m medley relay

Bettina Ustrowski (born 27 July 1976) is a German former swimmer, born in Berlin, who competed in the 1992 Summer Olympics. She won a gold medal at 1993 European Aquatics Championships, as part of the German 4 × 100 m medley relay team.
