= Keren Regal =

Israeli swimmer

Keren Regal קרן רגאל
Personal information
- Nationality: Israel
- Born: January 23, 1977 (age 49)

Sport
- Sport: Swimming
- Strokes: 50 m freestyle 200 m medley 400 m medley

Keren Regal (Hebrew: קרן רגאל; born January 23, 1977) is an Israeli former Olympic swimmer.

== Biography ==
Regal was born in Heftziba, a kibbutz in northern Israel. In the age of 8 she joined Hapoel Gilboa swimming club.

In 1991, She competed in the Juvenile European Aquatics Championships in Antwerp, Belgium in which she set a new Israeli record for 200 metres Individual Medley with a time of 2:25.47 breaking the 10 years record of Lior Birkan (2:27.87). At the same year, she also broke the Israeli record of 50 metres Freestyle.

She competed for Israel at the 1992 Summer Olympics in Barcelona, Spain, at the age of 15. In the Women's 400 metres Individual Medley she came in 29th with a time of 5:07.97, in the Women's 200 metres Individual Medley she came in 37th with a time of 2:27.85, and in the Women's 50 metres Freestyle she came in 41st with a time of 27.93. As of 2018, she was the youngest Olympic participant ever for Israel.

In 1993, She won a gold medal at the 14th Macabiah games.

She retired from swimming at the age of 17. Today, she works as a veterinarian and trains Newfoundland dogs for competitions.
