= Xu Guoyi =

Chinese swimmer (1970–2020)

Personal information
- Nationality: China
- Born: January 22, 1970 Ningbo, Zhejiang, China
- Died: July 19, 2020 (aged 50) Beijing, China
- Spouse: Lou Xia

Sport
- Sport: Swimming
- Retired: 1993

Xu Guoyi (January 22, 1970 - July 19, 2020) was a Chinese swimmer, a coach of the Chinese national swimming team, and a member of the Jiusan Society.

== Life ==
Xu began swimming training at age 10 at a local amateur sports school and joined the Zhejiang provincial swimming team at age 12. Specializing in individual medley, he once placed third in a national competition. Xu retired from competition in 1993 and stayed with the team as a coach. Since 1994, as coach of the Zhejiang provincial team, Xu trained many athletes who went on to win medals at the Asian Games, World Championships, and Olympic Games. His trainees included Chen Huijia, Cai Li, Lu Zhiwu, Ye Shiwen, Xu Jiayu, Wu Peng, Li Zhuhao, and Fu Yuanhui. In 2005, he became a coach for the Chinese national team. The Zhejiang provincial government awarded him first-class merit citations four times (2005, 2013, 2016, 2017). In 2012, he was honoured as an "Outstanding Coach of Zhejiang Province" and granted model labourer status. He was also recognized by the State General Administration of Sports and the Chinese Olympic Committee for his contributions to the 2008 Beijing Olympics. He received the National Sports Medal three times (2011, 2017, 2018) and was awarded a special government allowance by the State Council in 2017. In late 2015, Xu developed symptoms, including headaches and nausea, during a training camp in Yunnan. He was diagnosed with grade IV malignant glioma, the most severe form of brain cancer, and underwent emergency surgery in Beijing. Five months later, he returned to coaching the national team to prepare for the 2016 Summer Olympics. At the 13th National Games of China in 2017, Xu took the coach's oath on behalf of all coaches during the opening ceremony. Due to a relapse of his illness, he did not attend the 2019 World Aquatics Championships in Gwangju. Xu died of brain cancer in Beijing at 4:09 AM on July 19, 2020.

== Family ==
His wife, Lou Xia, is from Chun'an, Zhejiang Province. She is two years younger than him. They married in 1997. Lou Xia is also a swimmer. She represented the People's Republic of China in the 1992 Summer Olympics. After her sports career ended, she taught at Zhejiang Sports Vocational and Technical College and served as the coach of the Zhejiang Provincial Swimming Team. She and Xu Guoyi worked together to train Ye Shiwen. Lou Xia suffers from premature heartbeats and Meniere's syndrome. Xu Guoyi and Lou Xia have no children.
