= The Sports List =

- Presented by: Summer Sanders
- Country of origin: United States

Production
- Producers: Steve Michaels; Frank Sinton

Original release
- Network: Fox Sports Net
- Release: July 19 – September 7, 2004

The Sports List is an American television news show in which Summer Sanders counted down top ten lists of various sports topics. The show was first broadcast on August 1, 2004, on Fox Sports Net (FSN) and the last episode was shown on September 7, 2004. Sanders started the show by explaining the topic and then counted up the list from ten to one. During each segment, there were celebrities or sports analysts giving their input on each item. Topics included "Best Athletes Without Rings", "The Best Shortstops", and "The Most Hated People In Sports". The show is occasionally repeated on FSN.

== The Sports List topics ==
=== Ice hockey ===
- Ten Reasons The Capitals are Bad
- The Greatest Hockey Players of All-Time
- Greatest Slap Shots ever

=== American football ===
- The Greatest Quarterbacks of the 1980s Joe Montana
- The Greatest Quarterbacks of the 1990s Steve Young, Troy Aikman
- The Greatest Wide Receivers of All-Time Jerry Rice
- The Greatest Running Backs of All-Time Jim Brown
- The Toughest Football Players of All-Time Jack Lambert
- The Greatest Linebackers of All-Time Lawrence Taylor

=== Baseball ===
- Most Intimidating Pitchers
- Best Home Runs

=== Other ===
- The Greatest Non-Existent Sports Comparisons
- The Greatest Buzzer Beaters
- The Greatest Dynamic Duos
- The Greatest Sports Dynasties
- The Craziest Athletes
- The Greatest Pro-Rivalries of All-Time
- The Greatest Individual Streaks
- The Greatest Individual Comebacks
- Bizarre Moments
- Shocking Upsets
- Greatest Out of Shape Athletes
- Best Athletes Without a Ring
- Athletes Who Hung On Too Long
- Most Hated People in Sports
- Broadcasters
- Funny moments
- Greatest Flukes of All-Time
- Sexiest Athletes (Sanders was an "honorable mention" on the show and blushed when her name appeared.)
- Unbreakable Records
- Best Clutch Athletes
- Greatest Sports Heroes
- Biggest Blow Ups in Sports

== Frequent guests ==
- Dave Coulier
- Richard Lewis
- Tom Arnold
- Derek Jeter
- Sammy Sosa
- Emeka Okafor
- Tony Hawk
- Jim Belushi
- Michael Chiklis
- Al Michaels
- Mike Ditka
- Ben Maller
- Michael Ian Black
- Keyshawn Johnson
- Michael Irvin
