= Salama Ismail =

Egyptian swimmer (born 1986)

Personal information
- Full name: Salama Abdel Raouf Zenhoum; Ismail
- National team: Egypt
- Born: 30 September 1986 (age 39) Cairo, Egypt
- Height: 1.74 m (5 ft 9 in)
- Weight: 63 kg (139 lb)

Sport
- Sport: Swimming
- Strokes: Breaststroke
- Club: Zohour Sporting Club
Medal record
Women's swimming
Representing Egypt
All-Africa Games
| Silver medal – second place | 2003 Abuja | 100 m breaststroke |
| Silver medal – second place | 2003 Abuja | 200 m breaststroke |
| Silver medal – second place | 2003 Abuja | 200 m medley |
| Bronze medal – third place | 2003 Abuja | 50 m breaststroke |

Salma Abdel Raouf Zenhoum Ismail (Arabic: سلمى عبد الرؤوف زينهم اسماعيل; born September 30, 1986) is an Egyptian former swimmer, who specialized in breaststroke events. She currently holds three Egyptian records each in the 50, 100, and 200 m breaststroke, and plays simultaneously for Zohour Sporting Club in Cairo, and Dekalb International Training Centre (DITC) in Atlanta, Georgia. She also won a total of four medals (three silver and one bronze) at the 2003 All-Africa Games in Abuja, Nigeria.

Ismail qualified for the women's 100 m breaststroke, as Egypt's only female swimmer, at the 2004 Summer Olympics in Athens. She cleared a FINA B-standard entry time of 1:11.83 from the All-Africa Games in Abuja, Nigeria. She challenged seven other swimmers in heat three, including 15-year-olds Annabelle Carey of New Zealand and Lee Ji-Young of South Korea. She raced to third place by 0.26 of a second ahead of Argentina's Javiera Salcedo, outside her entry time of 1:12.20. Ismail failed to advance into the semifinals, as she placed twenty-eighth overall in the preliminaries.
