= Lou Xia =

Chinese swimmer (born 1972)

Personal information
- Born: 17 March 1972 (age 54)

Sport
- Sport: Swimming

Lou Xia (born 17 March 1972) is a Chinese swimmer and coach. She was the first swimmer from Zhejiang Province to compete at the Olympic Games. Lou represented China at the 1992 Summer Olympics in Barcelona, competing in the women's 100-metre breaststroke and the 100-metre medley relay. Her team placed fourth in the relay final. After retiring from competition, Lou became a professional swim coach in Zhejiang. She has trained several elite Chinese swimmers, including Chen Huijia, Cai Li, and Ye Shiwen, who went on to win medals in major international competitions.

In 1997, Lou married fellow swimmer and national team coach Xu Guoyi. Lou Xia suffers from premature heartbeats and Meniere's syndrome. Xu Guoyi and Lou Xia have no children. Despite her health issues, she continued contributing to the development of Chinese swimming and remained active in athlete training.
