= Corinne Leclair =

Mauritian swimmer

Personal information
- Born: June 24, 1970 (age 56)

Sport
- Sport: Swimming
Medal record
Women's swimming
Representing Mauritius
All-Africa Games
Gold medal – first place	1991 Cairo	400 m freestyle
Silver medal – second place	1991 Cairo	100 m freestyle
Silver medal – second place	1991 Cairo	200 m freestyle
Silver medal – second place	1991 Cairo	800 m freestyle

Corinne Leclair (born 24 June 1970) is a Mauritian swimmer who represented her country at the 1992 Summer Olympics.

Leclair was eleven years old when she started swimming, and just four years later she was competing in the 1985 Indian Ocean Island Games, the Games were held in Mauritius but the fifteen year old struggled against the more experienced ladies, but her time came when she competed in the 1990 Indian Ocean Island Games in Madagascar, where in the seven events she competed in she won six gold medals and one bronze medal, her golds came in the freestyle in 100, 200, 400 and 800 metres plus team gold in the 4 x 100 medley and 4 x 100 freestyle relay. Leclair won one individual gold medal and three silvers at the 1991 All-Africa Games.

Leclair was 22 years old when she represented Mauritius at the 1992 Summer Olympics in Barcelona, she entered four events in three days, first up was the 100 metres freestyle, she swam it in 1:00.95 and finished third in her heat and 44th overall, the next day she competed in the 200 metre freestyle and finished in 35th place. On her final day she competed in two events, the 400 metre freestyle where she had her best finish of 33rd place, followed by 13th place with three teammates in the 4 x 100 metre freestyle relay, Leclair swam the fastest in her team.

Leclair won the Mauritian Sports Council Sportswoman of the year in 1990 and 1991 and is still the only swimmer to win the award.

In 2013 Leclair got married and moved to the United States, where is a swimming instructor and a certified American Red Cross Lifeguard.
