= Myriam Mizouni =

Tunisian swimmer (born 1958)

Personal information
- Born: 23 September 1958 (age 67) Aryanah, Tunisia

Sport
- Sport: Swimming
Medal record
Representing Tunisia
African Games
Gold medal – first place	1978 Algiers	100m freestyle
Gold medal – first place	1978 Algiers	200m freestyle
Gold medal – first place	1978 Algiers	400m freestyle
Gold medal – first place	1978 Algiers	800m freestyle
Gold medal – first place	1978 Algiers	100m backstroke
Gold medal – first place	1978 Algiers	400m individual medley
Bronze medal – third place	1978 Algiers	100m butterfly
Bronze medal – third place	1978 Algiers	200m butterfly
Mediterranean Games
Silver medal – second place	1975 Algiers	100m freestyle

Myriam Mizouni (Arabic: مريم الميزوني; born 23 September 1958) is a Tunisian former swimmer. She competed in two events at the 1976 Summer Olympics. She was the first woman to represent Tunisia at the Olympics. In 1974, she competed in international competition in a duo with Ali Gharbi. She was elected second best African sportswoman of the year in 1975. From 1 July 2011 to 24 December 2011, she served as Secretary of State in the Tunisian Ministry of Youth and Sports. She is married with two children.
