= Joshua Ikhaghomi =

Nigerian swimmer (born 1975)

Personal information
- Born: 13 July 1975 (age 50)

Sport
- Sport: Swimming
Medal record
Representing Nigeria
African Games
Silver medal – second place	1991 Cairo	50m freestyle
Bronze medal – third place	1991 Cairo	100m freestyle

Joshua Ikhaghomi (born 13 July 1975) is a Nigerian swimmer. She competed in two events at the 1992 Summer Olympics.
