= Kyoko Iwasaki =

Japanese swimmer (born 1978)

Kyoko Iwasaki OLY
Personal information
- Born: 21 July 1978 (age 48) Numazu, Shizuoka, Japan
Medal record
Women's swimming
Representing Japan
Olympic Games
Gold medal – first place	1992 Barcelona	200 m breaststroke
Summer Universiade
Bronze medal – third place	1995 Fukuoka	200 m breaststroke

Kyoko Iwasaki (岩崎 恭子, Iwasaki Kyōko; married name: Kyoko Saito (斎藤恭子), born July 21, 1978) is a Japanese swimming coach and retired Olympic swimmer from Numazu, Shizuoka. She won the gold medal in the 200 metres breaststroke at the 1992 Summer Olympics in Barcelona, Spain. She was 14 years and 6 days old, making her the youngest Olympic gold medalist in the discipline of swimming at the time.

In 1998, the asteroid 35441 Kyoko was named after her.
