= Junko Torikai =

Japanese swimmer (born 1975)

Personal information
- Born: August 3, 1975 (age 50)

Sport
- Sport: Swimming
- Strokes: Backstroke

Junko Torikai (鳥飼 淳子, Torikai Junko) (born 3 August 1975) is a Japanese former swimmer who competed in the 1992 Summer Olympics.
