= Anita Nall =

American swimmer

Personal information
- Full name: Nadia Anita Louise Nall
- National team: United States
- Born: July 21, 1976 (age 50) Harrisburg, Pennsylvania
- Height: 5 ft 5 in (1.65 m)
- Weight: 123 lb (56 kg)

Sport
- Sport: Swimming
- Strokes: Breaststroke
- Club: North Baltimore Aquatic Club
- College team: Arizona State University
Medal record
Women's swimming
Representing the United States
Olympic Games
| Gold medal – first place | 1992 Barcelona | 4x100 m medley |
| Silver medal – second place | 1992 Barcelona | 100 m breaststroke |
| Bronze medal – third place | 1992 Barcelona | 200 m breaststroke |
World Championships (SC)
| Bronze medal – third place | 2000 Athens | 4x100 m medley |
Pan Pacific Championships
| Gold medal – first place | 1993 Kobe | 100 m breaststroke |
| Gold medal – first place | 1993 Kobe | 200 m breaststroke |
| Gold medal – first place | 1993 Kobe | 4x100 m medley |
Pan American Games
| Bronze medal – third place | 1995 Mar del Plata | 200 m breaststroke |

Nadia Anita Louise Nall (born July 21, 1976), also known by her married name Anita Nall-Richesson, is an American former competition swimmer, Olympic champion, and former world record-holder. As a 16-year-old at the 1992 Summer Olympics, Nall won a gold medal in the women's 4×100-meter medley relay, a silver medal in the women's 100-meter breaststroke, and a bronze in the women's 200-meter breaststroke. Earlier that year, she broke the world record in the women's 200-meter breaststroke, as a 15-year-old at the U.S. Olympic trials.

== Early years ==
Born in Harrisburg, Pennsylvania in 1976, Nall is named after record-setting gymnast Nadia Comăneci, who competed that year in the 1976 Summer Olympics as a 14-year-old. As a girl, Nall moved with her family to Towson, Maryland. She trained in the late 1980s and early 1990s at the North Baltimore Aquatic Club, the same place where another Towson teen swimming sensation, Michael Phelps, trained a decade later and who, like Nall, would set a world swimming record at age 15 (in the 200 m butterfly).

== Competitive swimming career ==
While competing for a place on the U.S. swimming team for the 1992 Summer Olympics, Nall set a then-world record at the Olympic trials. Murray Stephens, her coach at the North Baltimore Aquatic Club, said of Nall after she broke the world record, "Physically she's a strong girl. Competitively, she's probably 25. She knows how to compete and she likes to compete. She likes to swim aggressively."

Nall's specialty at the 1992 Summer Olympics was the breaststroke. She made the U.S. Olympic team that year as a 15-year-old, the youngest swimmer on the U.S. Olympics women's team. The head coach of Northwestern University's women's swim team was quoted just prior to the Olympics that year as saying, "Anita has technically a perfect breaststroke. The breaststroke is very much a lower body stroke where you really use your legs. She uses her body perfectly and gets the most out of her stroke technique-wise". Nall went on to swim the breaststroke leg of the 4 × 100 m medley relay at the 1992 Summer Olympics in Barcelona, winning the team gold medal and becoming the youngest American gold medalist in swimming since 1976.

The next year, Nall's swimming faltered, attributed to chronic fatigue syndrome and blood pressure abnormalities. She retired from swimming in 2000, after failing to qualify for the 2000 U.S. Olympics team.

== Personal life and later years ==
Nall graduated from Towson Catholic High School in 1994 and then earned a bachelor's degree in communications and Spanish at Arizona State University, graduating in 2002. That same year, she married former University of Kansas football player Luke Richesson. They currently reside in Denver, Colorado, where Luke is employed as strength and conditioning coach for the Denver Broncos. The couple has two children, son Luther (born 2003) and daughter Sunny (born 2005). Nall attributes her past health problems to food sensitivities affecting her immune system, which went undiagnosed until 2005, combined with poor nutrition. She is now a holistic nutrition specialist and Certified Life Coach with her own business.

== Awards ==
In 2008, Nall was inducted as an Honor Swimmer by the International Swimming Hall of Fame, which cited her swim medals won at such a young age and her technically perfect breaststroke.

== See also ==
- List of Arizona State University alumni
- List of Olympic medalists in swimming (women)
- World record progression 200 metres breaststroke
- World record progression 4 × 100 metres medley relay

Records
| Preceded by Silke Hörner | Women's 200-meter breaststroke world record-holder (long course); March 2, 1992 – March 15, 1994 | Succeeded by Rebecca Brown |
