= Daniela Brendel =

German swimmer (born 1973)

Olympic medal record

Women's Swimming

Representing Germany
| Silver medal – second place | 1992 Barcelona | 4x100 m medley relay |

Daniela Brendel (born 29 September 1973) is a German former swimmer, born in Berlin, who competed in the 1992 Summer Olympics.
