= Faten Ghattas (swimmer) =

Tunisian swimmer (born 1964)

Personal information
- Born: 13 October 1964 (age 62)

Sport
- Sport: Swimming
Medal record
Women's swimming
Representing Tunisia
All-Africa Games
Gold medal – first place	1987 Nairobi	200 m backstroke
Gold medal – first place	1987 Nairobi	200 m breaststroke
Gold medal – first place	1987 Nairobi	100 m butterfly
Gold medal – first place	1987 Nairobi	200 m butterfly
Gold medal – first place	1987 Nairobi	200 m medley
Gold medal – first place	1987 Nairobi	400 m medley
Silver medal – second place	1987 Nairobi	100 m freestyle
Silver medal – second place	1987 Nairobi	200 m freestyle
Silver medal – second place	1987 Nairobi	400 m freestyle

Faten Ghattas (born 13 October 1964) is a Tunisian swimmer. She competed in four events at the 1984 Summer Olympics.
