= Jana Haas (swimmer) =

German swimmer

Personal information
- Born: 20 September 1975 (age 50) Erfurt, East Germany

Sport
- Sport: Swimming

Jana Haas (born 20 September 1975) is a German swimmer. She competed in two events at the 1992 Summer Olympics.
