= Darija Alauf =

Yugoslav swimmer (born 1968)

Personal information
- Born: 25 December 1968 (age 57) Trbovlje, Slovenia, Yugoslavia

Sport
- Sport: Swimming

Darija Alauf (born 25 December 1968) is a Yugoslav swimmer. She competed in two events at the 1992 Summer Olympics.
