= Lee Chang-ha =

South Korean swimmer (born 1977)

Personal information
- Born: 1 July 1977 (age 48)

Sport
- Sport: Swimming
- Strokes: backstroke
Medal record
Representing South Korea
Asian Games
Bronze medal – third place	1990 Beijing	4x100m medley relay

Lee Chang-ha (born 1 July 1977) is a South Korean backstroke swimmer. She competed at the 1992 Summer Olympics and the 1996 Summer Olympics.
