= Mariya Kocheva =

Bulgarian swimmer

Personal information
- Born: February 26, 1974 (age 52) Silistra, Bulgaria

Sport
- Sport: Swimming

Mariya Zdravkova Kocheva (Bulgarian: Мария Здравкова Кочева) (born February 26, 1974, in ) is a retired backstroke swimmer from Bulgaria. She was the only female member of the Bulgarian National Swimming Team (four men and one woman) at the 1992 Summer Olympics in Barcelona, Spain, where she didn't qualify for the finals in the women's 100 m backstroke (37th place) and the women's 200 m backstroke (36th place).
