= Vola Hanta Ratsifa Andrihamanana =

Malagasy swimmer (born 1970)

Personal information
- Born: 28 September 1970 (age 56)

Sport
- Sport: Swimming
Medal record
Women's swimming
Representing Madagascar
All-Africa Games
Bronze medal – third place	1987 Nairobi	200 m breaststroke
Bronze medal – third place	1991 Cairo	100 m breaststroke
Bronze medal – third place	1991 Cairo	200 m breaststroke

Vola Hanta Ratsifa Andrihamanana (also spelled Ratsifandrihamanana; born 28 September 1970) is a Malagasy swimmer who competed in the 1992 Summer Olympics in Barcelona. She competed in the 50-metre freestyle and the 100-metre breaststroke but did not advance beyond the heats in either, with times of 28.22 and 1:17.77, respectively, in the two events. Her national record in the 100-metre breaststroke stood for 35 years, until May 2026.

== Biography ==
Vola Hanta Ratsifa Andrihamanana was born on 28 September 1970. She is the sister of Bako Ratsifa (born 1964), who swam at the 1980 Summer Olympics in Moscow. In 1985, her first year of competitive swimming, Ratsifa Andrihamanana won a Malagasy national title and a silver medal at the 1985 Indian Ocean Island Games. She trained with the support of a scholarship from the British Council. Bako Ratsifa later recalled the sisters training without heated pools, and sometimes without any pool during national squad camps, and having few chances to compete abroad.

She won two gold medals at the 1990 Indian Ocean Island Games in Antananarivo. At the 1991 All-Africa Games in Cairo, she set Malagasy records of 1:15.96 in the 100 metre breaststroke and 2:45.93 in the 200 metre breaststroke.

Ratsifa Andrihamanana was Madagascar's only swimmer at the 1992 Summer Olympics in Barcelona. She finished 43rd in the 50 metre freestyle in 28.22 seconds and 38th in the 100 metre breaststroke in 1:17.77. She did not advance beyond the heats in either event. She did not start in the 200 metre breaststroke or the 200 metre individual medley. She did not start in the 200 metre breaststroke or the 200 metre individual medley. During the Games, the Tampa Bay Times reported that she broke down in tears after learning of an attempted coup in Madagascar.

Her national record in the 100-metre breaststroke stood for 35 years, until 6 May 2026, Océane Rakotonanahary when broke it with a time of 1:15.50 to win bronze in the junior final at the African Swimming Championships in Oran, Algeria. That month, Les Nouvelles described Ratsifa Andrihamanana as an emblematic figure of Malagasy swimming in the 1990s.
