= Lin Li (swimmer) =

Chinese swimmer (born 1970)

Lin LI
Personal information
- Nationality: Chinese
- Born: May 4, 1970 (age 56) Nantong, Jiangsu, China

Sport
- Sport: Swimming
- Strokes: Individual Medley
Medal record
Women's swimming
Representing China
Olympic Games
Gold medal – first place	1992 Barcelona	200 m medley
Silver medal – second place	1992 Barcelona	400 m medley
Silver medal – second place	1992 Barcelona	200 m breaststroke
Bronze medal – third place	1996 Atlanta	200 m medley
World Championships (LC)
Gold medal – first place	1991 Perth	200 m medley
Gold medal – first place	1991 Perth	400 m medley
Pan Pacific Championships
Gold medal – first place	1989 Tokyo	200 m medley
Bronze medal – third place	1991 Edmonton	400 m medley
Summer Universiade
Gold medal – first place	1991 Sheffield	200 m backstroke
Gold medal – first place	1991 Sheffield	200 m medley
Gold medal – first place	1991 Sheffield	400 m medley
Silver medal – second place	1991 Sheffield	200 m breaststroke

Lin Li (Chinese: 林莉; pinyin: Lín Lì; born May 4, 1970) is an Olympic champion and former World Record holding swimmer from China. She swam for China at the:

- Olympics: 1988, 1992, 1996
- World Championships: 1991
- Asian Games: 1990, 1994
- Pan Pacific Championships: 1989, 1991

At the 1992 Olympics, she set a World Record in winning the women's 200 IM in 2:11.65, as well as also garnering silver medals in 200m breaststroke and 400m IM.

As of 2018, she currently coaches at Saratoga Star Aquatics-Live in Saratoga, California and has adjusted her last name from "Lin" to "Lynn".

Records
Preceded by Ute Geweniger	World Record Holder; Women's 200 Individual Medley; July 30, 1992 – October 17, 1997	Succeeded by Wu Yanyan
