= Ewa Synowska =

Polish swimmer (born 1974)

Personal information
- Born: 19 August 1974 Kraków, Poland
- Height: 1.67 m (5 ft 6 in)
- Weight: 52 kg (115 lb)

Sport
- Sport: Swimming
- Club: Korony Kraków
Medal record
Women's swimming
Representing Poland
European Championships
Bronze medal – third place	1991 Athens	400 m medley

Ewa Synowska (born 19 August 1974) is a retired Polish medley swimmer who won a bronze medal at the 1991 European Aquatics Championships. She also competed in three events at the 1992 Summer Olympics and finished eighth in the 200 m and 400 m medley. She won during her career nine national titles.
