= Jacqueline McKenzie (swimmer) =

Australian swimmer

Personal information
- Born: 16 April 1973 (age 52)

Sport
- Sport: Swimming

Jacqueline McKenzie (born 16 April 1973) is an Australian swimmer. She competed in two events at the 1992 Summer Olympics. She is the daughter of Olympic swimmer, Lyn McClements.

McKenzie also competed at the 1994 Commonwealth Games and finished seventh in the 200m individual medley.
