= Helena Straková =

Czech swimmer

Personal information
- Born: 22 April 1975 (age 51) Liberec, Czechoslovakia

Sport
- Sport: Swimming

Helena Straková (born 22 April 1975) is a Czech swimmer. She competed in two events at the 1992 Summer Olympics.
