= Małgorzata Galwas =

Polish swimmer

Personal information
- Born: 19 August 1973 (age 52) Zabrze, Poland

Sport
- Sport: Swimming

Małgorzata Galwas (born 19 August 1973) is a Polish backstroke swimmer. She competed in two events at the 1992 Summer Olympics.
