= Nancy Sweetnam =

Canadian swimmer

Personal information
- Full name: Nancy Sweetnam
- National team: Canada
- Born: August 14, 1973 (age 52) Lindsay, Ontario
- Height: 1.74 m (5 ft 9 in)
- Weight: 68 kg (150 lb)

Sport
- Sport: Swimming
- Strokes: Medley
- Club: Lindsay Lightingbolts
Medal record
Women's swimming
Representing Canada
World Championships (SC)
Silver medal – second place	1995 Rio de Janeiro	400 m medley
Summer Universiade
Gold medal – first place	1993 Buffalo	400 m medley
Silver medal – second place	1993 Buffalo	200 m medley

Nancy Sweetnam (born August 14, 1973) is a Canadian former competition swimmer who swam primarily in medley events. Sweetnam represented Canada in two consecutive Summer Olympics.

At the 1992 Summer Olympics in Barcelona, Spain, she finished in seventh place in the women's 200-metre individual medley, and thirteenth in the 400-metre individual medley. Four years later at the 1996 Summer Olympics in Atlanta, United States, she ended up in eleventh position in the 400-metre individual medley, after winning the silver medal in the same event at the 1995 FINA Short Course World Championships in Rio de Janeiro.

She is a cousin of Canadian pop-rock singer-songwriter Skye Sweetnam.
