= Eri Kimura =

Japanese swimmer (born 1973)

Personal information
- Born: December 7, 1973 (age 52)

Sport
- Sport: Swimming
- Strokes: Medley

Achievements and titles
- Olympic finals: 1992 Summer Olympics

Eri Kimura (木村 衣里, Kimura Eri; born 7 December 1973) is a retired Japanese swimmer who competed in the 1992 Summer Olympics.
