= Sarah Murphy (swimmer) =

Zimbabwean swimmer (born 1975)

Personal information
- Born: 5 September 1975 (age 50)

Sport
- Sport: Swimming
Medal record
Representing Zimbabwe
African Games
Gold medal – first place	1991 Cairo	100m backstroke
Gold medal – first place	1991 Cairo	200m backstroke

Sarah Jane Murphy (born 5 September 1975) is a Zimbabwean former backstroke swimmer. She competed in two events at the 1992 Summer Olympics.
