= Ana Fortin =

Honduran swimmer (born 1972)

Personal information
- Born: 2 February 1972 (age 54)

Sport
- Sport: Swimming

Ana Fortin (born 2 February 1972) is a Honduran swimmer. She competed at the 1988 Summer Olympics and the 1992 Summer Olympics.
