= Nathalie Wunderlich =

Swiss swimmer

Personal information
- Born: 3 June 1971 (age 55)

Sport
- Sport: Swimming

Nathalie Wunderlich (born 3 June 1971) is a Swiss backstroke and medley swimmer. She competed in three events at the 1992 Summer Olympics.
