= Bako Ratsifa =

Malagasy swimmer (born 1964)

Personal information
- Born: 18 March 1964 (age 62)

Sport
- Sport: Swimming
Medal record
Representing Madagascar
African Games
Gold medal – first place	1987 Nairobi	100m backstroke
Silver medal – second place	1987 Nairobi	50m freestyle
Bronze medal – third place	1987 Nairobi	100m freestyle

Bako Ratsifa (born 18 March 1964) is a Malagasy swimmer. She competed in two events at the 1980 Summer Olympics. She was the first woman to represent Madagascar at the Olympics.

She is the sister of Olympic swimmer Vola Hanta Ratsifandrihamanana (born 1970), who swam in the 1992 games in Barcelona.
