= Storme Moodie =

Zimbabwean swimmer (born 1974)

Personal information
- Born: 24 March 1974 (age 52)

Sport
- Sport: Swimming
Medal record
Representing Zimbabwe
African Games
| Gold medal – first place | 1987 Nairobi | 4x100m medley relay |
| Silver medal – second place | 1987 Nairobi | 100m backstroke |
| Silver medal – second place | 1987 Nairobi | 200m backstroke |
| Silver medal – second place | 1991 Cairo | 100m backstroke |
| Silver medal – second place | 1991 Cairo | 200m backstroke |

Storme Cheryl Moodie (born 24 March 1974) is a Zimbabwean former backstroke swimmer. She competed in two events at the 1992 Summer Olympics.
