= Jill Brukman =

South African swimmer (born 1973)

Personal information
- Born: March 8, 1973 (age 53)

Sport
- Sport: Swimming
Medal record
Representing South Africa
African Games
Gold medal – first place	1995 Harare	200m backstroke
Bronze medal – third place	1995 Harare	100m backstroke

Jill Brukman (born 8 March 1973) is a former backstroke and medley swimmer from South Africa. She competed for her native country at the 1992 Summer Olympics in Barcelona, Spain, swimming a total number of four events. Brukman didn't reach the final in any of those starts.
