= Swimming at the 1984 Summer Olympics – Men's 200 metre freestyle =

Men's 200 metre freestyle at the Games of the XXIII Olympiad
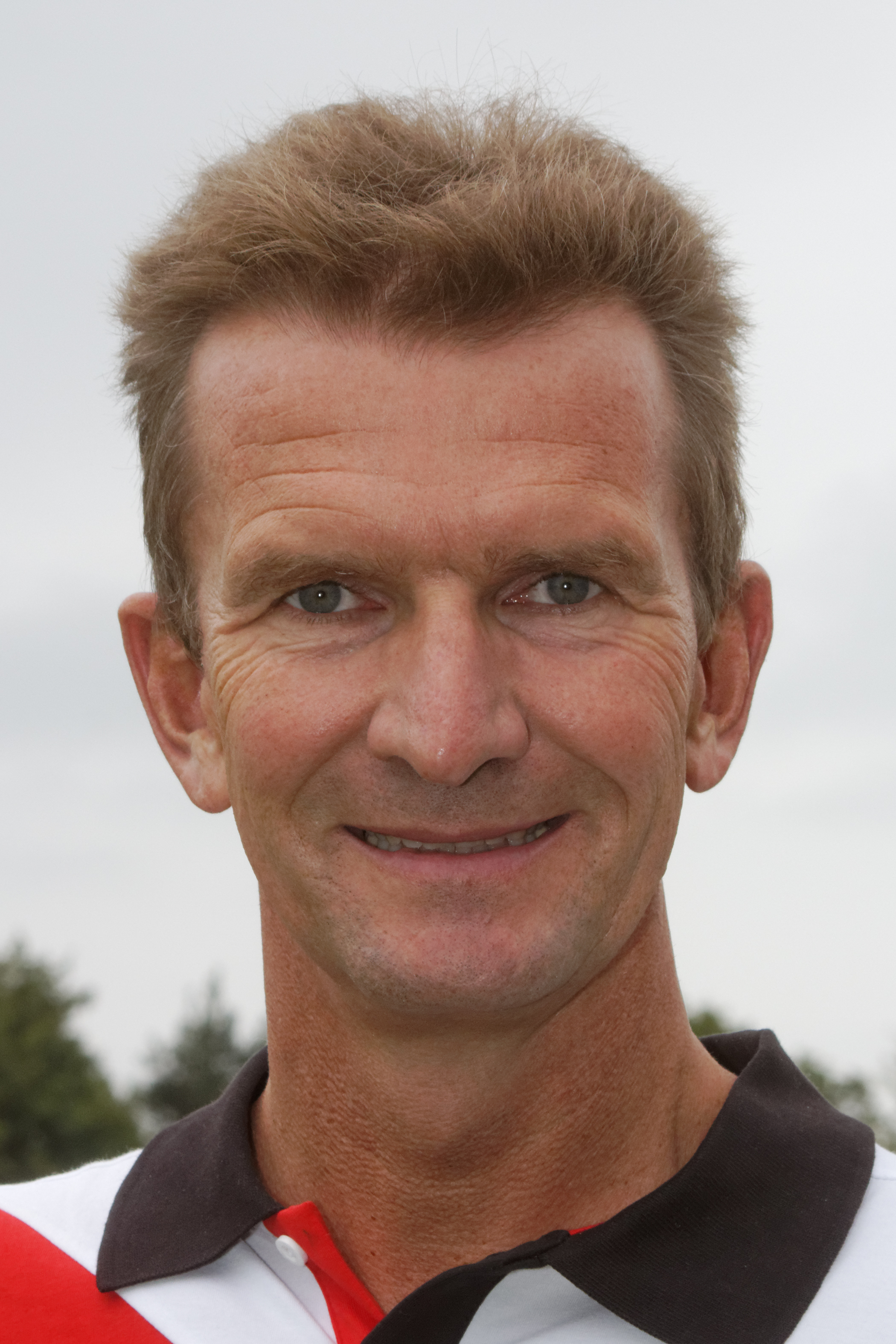
- Gold medalist Michael Gross (2014)
- Venue: McDonald's Olympic Swim Stadium
- Date: 29 July 1984 (heats & final)
- Competitors: 56 from 36 nations
- Winning time: 1:47.44 WR

Medalists
1st place, gold medalist(s)		Michael Gross	West Germany
2nd place, silver medalist(s)		Mike Heath	United States
3rd place, bronze medalist(s)		Thomas Fahrner	West Germany

The men's 200 metre freestyle event at the 1984 Summer Olympics was held in the McDonald's Olympic Swim Stadium in Los Angeles, California, on July 29, 1984. There were 56 competitors from 36 nations, with each nation having up to two swimmers (down from a maximum of three in previous Games). The event was won by Michael Gross of West Germany, the nation's first victory in the event. His countryman Thomas Fahrner took bronze. Americans placed second and fourth, with Mike Heath earning silver and Jeff Float in fourth place.

== Background ==
This was the seventh appearance of the 200 metre freestyle event. It was first contested in 1900. It would be contested a second time, though at 220 yards, in 1904. After that, the event did not return until 1968; since then, it has been on the programme at every Summer Games.

Two of the 8 finalists from the 1980 Games returned: sixth-place finisher Paolo Revelli of Italy and seventh-place finisher Thomas Lejdström of Sweden. The reigning World Champion was Michael Gross of West Germany, having beaten American Rowdy Gaines. Gross, who had also set a world record in the event earlier in 1984, was heavily favoured in Los Angeles. The host United States was represented by Mike Heath and Jeff Float, both strong medal contenders.

The People's Republic of China, Chinese Taipei, Denmark, Fiji, Honduras, the Netherlands Antilles, San Marino, Swaziland, Turkey, and Uruguay each made their debut in the event. Australia made its seventh appearance, the only nation to have competed in all prior editions of the event.

== Competition format ==
The competition used a two-round (heats, final) format. The advancement rule followed the format introduced in 1952. A swimmer's place in the heat was not used to determine advancement; instead, the fastest times from across all heats in a round were used. There were 7 heats of up to 8 swimmers each. The top 8 swimmers advanced to the final. The 1984 event also introduced a consolation or "B" final; the swimmers placing 9th through 16th in the heats competed in this "B" final for placing. Swim-offs were used as necessary to break ties.

This swimming event used freestyle swimming, which means that the method of the stroke is not regulated (unlike backstroke, breaststroke, and butterfly events). Nearly all swimmers use the front crawl or a variant of that stroke. Because an Olympic-size swimming pool is 50 metres long, this race consisted of four lengths of the pool.

== Records ==
Prior to this competition, the existing world and Olympic records were as follows.

World record	Michael Gross (FRG)	1:47.55	Munich, West Germany	8 June 1984
Olympic record	Sergey Koplyakov (URS)	1:49.81	Moscow, Soviet Union	21 July 1980

The following records were established during the competition:

Date	Round	Swimmer	Nation	Time	Record
29 July	Heat 7	Michael Gross	West Germany	1:48.03	OR
29 July	Final A	Michael Gross	West Germany	1:47.44	WR

== Schedule ==
All times are Pacific Daylight Time (UTC-7)

Date	Time	Round
Sunday, 29 July 1984	9:50; 16:55; 17:05	Heats; Final A Final B

== Results ==
=== Heats ===
Rule: The eight fastest swimmers advance to final A, while the next eight to final B.

Rank	Heat	Lane	Swimmer	Nation	Time	Notes
1	7	4	Michael Gross	West Germany	1:48.03	QA, OR
2	6	4	Mike Heath	United States	1:49.87	QA
3	4	4	Thomas Fahrner	West Germany	1:50.00	QA
4	3	4	Alberto Mestre	Venezuela	1:50.73	QA
5	5	4	Jeff Float	United States	1:50.95	QA
6	5	3	Frank Drost	Netherlands	1:51.32	QA, NR
7	1	5	Peter Dale	Australia	1:51.42	QA, NR
8	7	5	Marco Dell'Uomo	Italy	1:51.67	QA
9	4	5	Anders Holmertz	Sweden	1:51.70	QB
10	6	5	Thomas Lejdström	Sweden	1:51.76	QB
10	4	3	Alex Baumann	Canada	1:51.76	QB, WD
12	2	3	Paul Easter	Great Britain	1:51.80	QB
13	5	6	Juan Carlos Vallejo	Spain	1:51.97	QB, NR
14	3	5	Andrew Astbury	Great Britain	1:52.01	QB
15	2	5	Hans Kroes	Netherlands	1:52.37	QB
16	1	4	Peter Szmidt	Canada	1:52.48	QB
17	6	3	Carlos Scanavino	Uruguay	1:52.70	QB
18	5	5	Justin Lemberg	Australia	1:52.73	
19	7	5	Borut Petrič	Yugoslavia	1:52.74	
20	3	3	Jorge Fernandes	Brazil	1:53.03	
21	2	8	Cyro Delgado	Brazil	1:53.22	
22	2	4	Paolo Revelli	Italy	1:53.46	
23	1	6	Franz Mortensen	Denmark	1:54.09	NR
24	6	2	Anthony Mosse	New Zealand	1:54.12	NR
25	1	2	Stéfan Voléry	Switzerland	1:54.19	NR
26	7	2	Hiroshi Sakamoto	Japan	1:54.71	
27	1	7	Michael Miao	Chinese Taipei	1:55.01	NR
28	3	6	Javier Miralpeix	Spain	1:55.25	
29	6	6	Jean-Marie François	Venezuela	1:55.28	
30	1	3	Darjan Petrič	Yugoslavia	1:55.68	
31	4	7	César Sánchez	Mexico	1:55.82	
32	3	2	Gökhan Attaroglu	Turkey	1:55.92	
33	2	6	Shigeo Ogata	Japan	1:55.97	
34	7	7	Shen Jianqiang	China	1:56.08	
35	5	2	Mike Davidson	New Zealand	1:56.20	
36	2	2	Thierry Jacot	Switzerland	1:56.54	
37	7	6	Fernando Cañales	Puerto Rico	1:56.60	
38	5	7	Evert Johan Kroon	Netherlands Antilles	1:57.05	
39	3	7	William Wilson	Philippines	1:57.18	
40	2	7	Sean Nottage	Bahamas	1:57.54	
41	6	7	Scott Newkirk	Virgin Islands	1:57.74	
42	4	2	Carlos Romo	Mexico	1:58.77	
43	4	6	Fabián Ferrari	Argentina	1:59.39	
44	7	1	Mohamed Youssef	Egypt	1:59.71	
45	4	1	Erik Rosskopf	Virgin Islands	2:02.04	
46	2	1	Samuela Tupou	Fiji	2:02.22	
47	5	1	Ingi Jónsson	Iceland	2:02.23	
48	6	1	Tsang Yi Ming	Hong Kong	2:03.11	
49	3	1	Ng Wing Hon	Hong Kong	2:03.66	
50	7	8	Roberto Granados	Guatemala	2:05.21	
51	1	1	Rodrigo Leal	Guatemala	2:05.96	
52	1	8	Juan José Piro	Honduras	2:12.51	
53	3	8	Trevor Ncala	Swaziland	2:15.30	
54	4	8	Michele Piva	San Marino	2:15.39	
55	5	8	Percy Sayegh	Lebanon	2:20.76	
56	6	8	Rami Kantari	Lebanon	2:25.43	

=== Finals ===
==== Final B ====
Rank	Lane	Swimmer	Nation	Time	Notes
9	3	Paul Easter	Great Britain	1:51.70	
10	6	Juan Carlos Vallejo	Spain	1:51.77	NR
11	7	Hans Kroes	Netherlands	1:52.36	
12	4	Anders Holmertz	Sweden	1:52.44	
13	8	Carlos Scanavino	Uruguay	1:52.54	
14	1	Peter Szmidt	Canada	1:52.56	
15	2	Andrew Astbury	Great Britain	1:53.02	
16	5	Thomas Lejdström	Sweden	1:53.63	

==== Final A ====
Rank	Lane	Swimmer	Nation	Time	Notes
1st place, gold medalist(s)	4	Michael Gross	West Germany	1:47.44	WR
2nd place, silver medalist(s)	5	Mike Heath	United States	1:49.10	
3rd place, bronze medalist(s)	3	Thomas Fahrner	West Germany	1:49.69	
4	2	Jeff Float	United States	1:50.18	
5	6	Alberto Mestre	Venezuela	1:50.23	NR
6	7	Frank Drost	Netherlands	1:51.62	
7	8	Marco Dell'Uomo	Italy	1:52.20	
8	1	Peter Dale	Australia	1:53.84	
