= Swimming at the 1984 Summer Olympics – Men's 4 × 200 metre freestyle relay =

Men's 4 × 200 metre freestyle relay at the Games of the XXIII Olympiad
- Venue: McDonald's Olympic Swim Stadium
- Date: 30 July 1984 (heats & final)
- Competitors: 62 from 14 nations
- Teams: 14
- Winning time: 7:15.69 WR

Medalists
1st place, gold medalist(s)		Mike Heath, David Larson, Jeff Float, Bruce Hayes, Geoff Gaberino*, Richard Saeger*	United States
2nd place, silver medalist(s)		Thomas Fahrner, Dirk Korthals, Alexander Schowtka, Michael Gross, Rainer Henkel*	West Germany
3rd place, bronze medalist(s)		Neil Cochran, Paul Easter, Paul Howe, Andrew Astbury; *Indicates the swimmer only competed in the preliminary heats.	Great Britain

The final of the men's 4 × 200 metre freestyle relay event at the 1984 Summer Olympics was held in Los Angeles, California, on July 30, 1984. Fourteen teams participated in the heats, with the fastest eight qualifying for the final.

== Records ==
Prior to this competition, the existing world and Olympic records were as follows.

World record	West Germany (FRG); Thomas Fahrner (1:51.13); Alexander Schowtka (1:51.28); Andreas Schmidt (1:50.78); Michael Gross (1:47.21)	7:20.40	Rome, Italy	23 August 1983
Olympic record	United States; Mike Bruner (1:52.35); Bruce Furniss (1:49.56); John Naber (1:51.20); Jim Montgomery (1:50.11)	7:23.22	Montreal, Canada	21 July 1976

The following new world and Olympic records were set during this competition.

Date	Event	Name	Nationality	Time	Record
30 July	Heat 1	Geoff Gaberino (1:49.80); David Larson (1:50.18); Bruce Hayes (1:50.04); Richard Saeger (1:48.85)	United States	7:18.87	WR
30 July	Final	Mike Heath (1:48.67); David Larson (1:49.01); Jeff Float (1:49.60); Bruce Hayes (1:48.41)	United States	7:15.69	WR

== Results ==
=== Heats ===
Rule: The eight fastest teams advance to the final (Q).

Rank	Heat	Lane	Nation	Swimmers	Time	Notes
1	1	4	United States	Geoff Gaberino (1:49.80); David Larson (1:50.18); Bruce Hayes (1:50.04); Richard Saeger (1:48.85)	7:18.87	Q, WR
2	2	4	West Germany	Rainer Henkel (1:52.94); Dirk Korthals (1:50.37); Alexander Schowtka (1:50.82); Thomas Fahrner (1:51.16)	7:25.29	Q
3	1	5	Great Britain	Neil Cochran (1:52.91); Paul Easter (1:50.63); Paul Howe (1:52.02); Andrew Astbury (1:51.27)	7:26.83	Q, NR
4	2	6	Australia	Justin Lemberg (1:52.65); Ron McKeon (1:51.04); Tom Stachewicz (1:52.61); Graeme Brewer (1:50.63)	7:26.93	Q, OC
5	1	6	France	Pierre Andraca (1:53.13); Dominique Bataille (1:51.42); Michel Pou (1:52.74); Stéphan Caron (1:50.11)	7:27.40	Q, NR
6	2	2	Canada	Sandy Goss (1:52.15); Benoit Clément (1:52.51); Wayne Kelly (1:52.08); Peter Szmidt (1:51.57)	7:28.31	Q, NR
7	1	3	Sweden	Michael Söderlund (1:51.95); Tommy Werner (1:52.28); Mikael Örn (1:53.01); Anders Holmertz (1:51.36)	7:28.60	Q
8	1	2	Netherlands	Hans Kroes (1:53.09); Peter Drost (1:53.16); Edsard Schlingemann (1:51.94); Frank Drost (1:50.95)	7:29.14	Q, NR
9	1	1	Brazil	Cyro Delgado (1:52.49); Marcelo Jucá (1:53.08); Djan Madruga (1:52.51); Jorge Fernandes (1:52.33)	7:30.41	SA
10	2	6	Venezuela	Jean-Marie François (1:53.75); Alberto José Umana (1:55.66); Rafael Vidal (1:51.91); Alberto Mestre (1:50.47)	7:31.79	NR
11	2	7	Spain	Juan Enrique Escalas (1:52.76); Rafael Escalas (1:54.47); Juan Carlos Vallejo (1:51.59); David López-Zubero (1:53.39)	7:32.21	
12	2	1	Turkey	Gökhan Attaroğlu (1:56.01); Kemal Sabri Özün (2:00.93); Ahmed Nakkaş (1:59.45); İhsan Sabri Özün (2:02.97)	7:59.36	NR
	1	7	Japan	Taihei Saka (1:54.79); Hiroshi Sakamoto; Keisuke Okuno; Shigeo Ogata	DSQ	
	2	5	Italy	Marco Colombo (1:53.38); Marcello Guarducci; Fabrizio Rampazzo; Marco Dell'Uomo	DSQ	

=== Final ===
Rank	Lane	Nation	Swimmers	Time	Notes
1st place, gold medalist(s)	4	United States	Mike Heath (1:48.67); David Larson (1:49.01); Jeff Float (1:49.60); Bruce Hayes (1:48.41)	7:15.69	WR
2nd place, silver medalist(s)	5	West Germany	Thomas Fahrner (1:49.83); Dirk Korthals (1:48.75); Alexander Schowtka (1:50.26); Michael Gross (1:46.89)	7:15.73	EU
3rd place, bronze medalist(s)	3	Great Britain	Neil Cochran (1:52.08); Paul Easter (1:49.64); Paul Howe (1:51.63); Andrew Astbury (1:51.43)	7:24.78	NR
4	6	Australia	Peter Dale (1:51.96); Justin Lemberg (1:52.08); Ron McKeon (1:50.52); Graeme Brewer (1:51.07)	7:25.63	OC
5	7	Canada	Sandy Goss (1:51.69); Wayne Kelly (1:53.08); Peter Szmidt (1:51.23); Alex Baumann (1:50.51)	7:26.51	NR
6	1	Sweden	Michael Söderlund (1:51.73); Tommy Werner (1:51.79); Anders Holmertz (1:51.33); Thomas Lejdström (1:51.68)	7:26.53	NR
7	8	Netherlands	Hans Kroes (1:51.84); Peter Drost (1:52.77); Edsard Schlingemann (1:51.42); Frank Drost (1:50.69)	7:26.72	NR
8	2	France	Stéphan Caron (1:50.99) NR; Dominique Bataille (1:52.49); Michel Pou (1:53.41); Pierre Andraca (1:53.27)	7:30.16	
