= Swimming at the 1983 Pan American Games – Men's 4 × 200 metre freestyle relay =

Men's 4 × 200 metre freestyle relay at the 1983 Pan American Games
- Venue: -
- Dates: August 18 (preliminaries and finals)
- Competitors: from - nations

Medalists
Gold medal	David Larson; Richard Saeger; Bruce Hayes; Rowdy Gaines	United States
Silver medal	Cyro Delgado; Djan Madruga; Jorge Fernandes; Marcelo Jucá	Brazil
Bronze medal	Jean François; Antonio Sánchez; Rafael Vidal; Alberto Mestre	Venezuela

The men's 4 × 200 metre freestyle relay competition of the swimming events at the 1983 Pan American Games took place on 18 August. The last Pan American Games champion was the United States.

This race consisted of sixteen lengths of the pool. Each of the four swimmers completed four lengths of the pool. The first swimmer had to touch the wall before the second could leave the starting block.

== Results ==
All times are in minutes and seconds.

KEY:	q	Fastest non-qualifiers	Q	Qualified	GR	Games record	NR	National record	PB	Personal best	SB	Seasonal best

=== Final ===
The final was held on August 18.

Rank	Name	Nationality	Time	Notes
1st place, gold medalist(s)	David Larson (1:53.01); Richard Saeger (1:51.53); Bruce Hayes (1:50.06); Rowdy Gaines (1:49.03)	United States	7:23.63	GR
2nd place, silver medalist(s)	Cyro Delgado; Djan Madruga; Jorge Fernandes; Marcelo Jucá	Brazil	7:32.78	
3rd place, bronze medalist(s)	Jean François; Antonio Sánchez; Rafael Vidal; Alberto Mestre	Venezuela	7:33.82	AR
4	- - - -	Canada	7:35.51	
5	- - - -	Puerto Rico	7:54.01	
6	- - - -	Argentina	7:59.10	
7	- - - -	Cuba	8:03.10	
8	- - - -	Suriname	8:41.63	NR
