= Geoff Gaberino =

American swimmer (born 1962)

Personal information
- Full name: Geoffrey Steven Gaberino
- Nickname: "Geoff"
- National team: United States
- Born: July 18, 1962 (age 64) Dallas, Texas, U.S.
- Height: 6 ft 3 in (1.91 m)
- Weight: 179 lb (81 kg)
- Spouse: Susan

Sport
- Sport: Swimming
- Strokes: Freestyle
- College team: University of Florida
- Coach: Randy Reese (Florida)
Medal record
Men's swimming
Representing the United States
Olympic Games
Gold medal – first place	1984 Los Angeles	4x200 m freestyle

Geoffrey Steven Gaberino (born July 18, 1962) is an American former competition swimmer, Olympic gold medalist, and former world record-holder. Gaberino was a member of two national championship college teams and a four-time college national champion in relay events.

== Early years ==
Geoff Gaberino was born in Dallas, Texas in 1962. He was a standout swimmer at the Baylor School in Chattanooga, Tennessee, and led the team to an Eastern Prep School Championship in 1980.

== College swimming career ==
Gaberino attended the University of Florida in Gainesville, Florida, where he swam for coach Randy Reese's Florida Gators swimming and diving team in National Collegiate Athletic Association (NCAA) competition from 1981 to 1984. Gaberino won four NCAA championships and five SEC titles as a member of the Gators' winning relay teams in the 4x100-yard and 4x200-yard events. A fifteen-time All-American at the University of Florida, Gaberino served as team captain in 1983 and 1984 when the Gators men's swim team won back-to-back NCAA national team championships. Gaberino graduated from Florida with his bachelor's degree in 1984 and his master's degree in business administration in 1988.

== International swimming career ==
Gaberino qualified to represent the United States at the 1984 Summer Olympics in Los Angeles. He earned a gold medal by swimming for the winning U.S. team in the preliminary heats of the men's 4×200-meter freestyle relay. The American team of David Larson, Bruce Hayes and Richard Saeger set a new world record in the Olympic preliminary heat (7:18.87), only for the Americans to break the record again in the event final later on the same day.

Gaberino has been inducted into the Tennessee Swimming Hall of Fame, Chattanooga Sport Hall of Fame, Baylor School Sport Hall of Fame, and the University of Florida Athletic Hall of Fame as a "Gator Great" in 1996.

== Life after swimming ==
Gaberino and his wife Susan live with their two sons, Wilson and Spencer, in Gulf Shores, Alabama, where they own a small vacation rental property management company. Gaberino serves on an Alabama City of Excellence (ACE) Economic Development Committee, and is a board member of The Academy of Arts & Sciences. He has served on The Waterway Commission in addition to coaching youth baseball and serving as a Boy Scout leader. Gaberino is also a veteran celebrity swimmer for Swim Across America, a charitable organization that uses former Olympians to raise funds for cancer research, in which he has participated for the past decade.

His role in the "Olympic Day in the Middle School" program earned him the honor of being asked in the 1996 Olympics opening ceremony to be one of the eight bearers of the Olympic flag at the beginning of the games.

== World records ==
Men's 4×200-meter medley relay

Time	Date	Event	Location
7:18.87	July 30, 1984	1984 Summer Olympics	Los Angeles, California

== See also ==
- List of Olympic medalists in swimming (men)
- List of University of Florida alumni
- List of University of Florida Athletic Hall of Fame members
- List of University of Florida Olympians
- World record progression 4 × 200 metres freestyle relay

== Bibliography ==
- De George, Matthew, Pooling Talent: Swimming's Greatest Teams, Rowman & Littlefield, Lanham, Maryland (2014). ISBN 978-1-4422-3701-8.
