= Mike Heath (swimmer) =

American swimmer (born 1964)

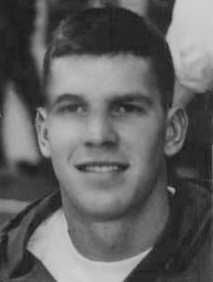
- Heath in 1984

Personal information
- Full name: Michael Steward Heath
- National team: United States
- Born: April 9, 1964 (age 62) McAllen, Texas, U.S.
- Height: 6 ft 0 in (1.83 m)
- Weight: 170 lb (77 kg)

Sport
- Sport: Swimming
- Strokes: Freestyle
- College team: University of Florida
Medal record
Representing United States
Olympic Games
Gold medal – first place	1984 Los Angeles	4×100 m freestyle
Gold medal – first place	1984 Los Angeles	4×200 m freestyle
Gold medal – first place	1984 Los Angeles	4×100 m medley
Silver medal – second place	1984 Los Angeles	200 m freestyle
World Championships (LC)
Gold medal – first place	1986 Madrid	4×100 m freestyle
Bronze medal – third place	1986 Madrid	4×200 m freestyle
Pan Pacific Championships
Gold medal – first place	1985 Tokyo	200 m freestyle
Gold medal – first place	1985 Tokyo	4×100 m freestyle
Gold medal – first place	1985 Tokyo	4×200 m freestyle
Silver medal – second place	1985 Tokyo	100 m freestyle

Michael Steward Heath (born April 9, 1964) is an American former competition swimmer who specialized in freestyle events. He is a three-time Olympic gold medalist, and a former world record-holder in two relay swimming events. A native of Texas, he won two national collegiate championship competing for the University of Florida. During his elite swimming career, Heath won ten medals in major international championships, including seven golds, two silvers and a bronze, spanning the Olympic Games, FINA World Championships, and Pan Pacific Championships.

== Early years ==
Heath was born in McAllen, Texas. He attended Highland Park High School in University Park, Texas (a Dallas suburb), and competed for the Highland Park High School swim team. In 1980, he set a new Texas state high school record in the boys' 200-yard freestyle (1:37.88); he set a second state record in the event in 1982 (1:37.53), breaking his own previous record in the process.

== College swimming career ==
Heath accepted an athletic scholarship to attend the University of Florida in Gainesville, Florida, where he swam for coach Randy Reese's Florida Gators swimming and diving team in National Collegiate Athletic Association (NCAA) and Southeastern Conference (SEC) competition from 1983 to 1986. He was a member of the Gators' 1983 and 1984 NCAA men's championship teams, as well as four consecutive SEC championships teams. As a Gator swimmer, he won NCAA national titles in the 400-yard freestyle relay (1983), 800-yard freestyle relay (1983, 1984), and 200-yard freestyle (1984), and received nineteen All-American honors. His strong finish swimming the anchor leg for the Gators in the 4×100-yard freestyle relay provided the Gators' winning points in their first NCAA national team championship in 1983. He also won seven SEC titles, and was recognized as the SEC male swimmer of the year in 1983 and 1985. Heath graduated from the University of Florida with a bachelor's degree in exercise and sports science in 1988, and was inducted into the University of Florida Athletic Hall of Fame as a "Gator Great" in 1996.

== International swimming career ==
Heath, who had not previously been a member of the U.S. national team, won the 100- and 200-meter freestyle events at the 1984 U.S. Olympic trials, and thereby qualified to compete in the two Olympic individual events and for the U.S. relay teams. As a newcomer to the U.S. trials, he made a dramatic statement by setting a new American record in the preliminary heats of the 200-meter freestyle. At the 1984 Summer Olympics in Los Angeles, he won three gold medals and a silver.

He won his first Olympic gold medal by swimming the lead-off leg in the men's 4×200-meter freestyle relay, and Heath and his American teammates David Larson, Jeff Float and Bruce Hayes set a new world record of 7:15.69, edging the Michael Gross-led West Germans by four one-hundredths (0.04) of a second. He won his second gold medal by helping set another world record of 3:19.03 in the men's 4×100-meter freestyle relay, together with fellow Americans Chris Cavanaugh, Matt Biondi and Rowdy Gaines, finishing sixty-five one-hundredths (0.65) of a second ahead of the second-place Australians. He then earned a third gold medal by swimming for the winning U.S. team in the preliminary heats of the 4×100-meter medley relay. In a word play on the title of the popular 1984 movie Ghostbusters, American media dubbed Heath and his 4×200-meter relay teammates the "Gross Busters."

In individual Olympic competition, Heath won a silver medal in the 200-meter freestyle (1:49.10) behind Gross's world record-setting performance (1:47.44). He also placed fourth in the 100-meter freestyle event final (50.41); the outcome was controversial, however, because of a premature starter gun and a quick start by Gaines, the winner. Gaines' coach, Richard Quick, knew of starter Frank Silvestri's propensity to fire the starter gun almost immediately when the swimmers mounted the blocks. Gaines gained about a meter's head start on the competition; video of the event later confirmed that one or more of the swimmers had not been set when the starter gun fired.

After the 1984 Olympics, Heath continued to swim for the U.S. national team, and remained a fixture on the freestyle relay teams. At the 1985 Pan Pacific Championships in Tokyo, gold medalists Scott McCadam, Heath, Paul Wallace and Biondi set a new world record of 3:17.08 in the 4×100-meter freestyle relay. Together with Biondi, Duffy Dillon and Craig Oppel, he won another gold medal in the 4×200-meter freestyle relay (7:17.63). Individually, Heath won a Pan Pacific Championships gold medal in the 200-meter freestyle (1:49.29) by beating Biondi (1:50.19) and Canadian Sandy Goss (1:50.56). He also won a Pan Pacific silver medal in the 100-meter freestyle (50.78), finishing a fraction of a second behind Biondi (50.44). Heath again swam for the U.S. relay teams at the 1986 World Aquatics Championships in Madrid; Tom Jager, Heath, Paul Wallace and Biondi won the 4×100-meter freestyle (3:19.89); and Eric Boyer, Heath, Dan Jorgensen and Biondi placed third in the 4×200-meter freestyle (7:18.29).

== Life after competition swimming ==
Heath was an assistant coach for the Florida Gators swim team from 1988 to 1989. After graduating from the University of Florida, Heath first worked as a salesman, before he coached swimming for Beaches Aquatic Club in Neptune Beach, Florida, for six years, and thereafter at Episcopal High School in Jacksonville, Florida. He is married to Sherri-Lee Schricker, who was a member of the Florida Gators swim team at the University of Florida from 1984 to 1987, and they have two children. Their son Grady will swim for the Florida Gators beginning in 2015–16.

== World records ==
Men's 4×100-meter freestyle relay

Time	Date	Event	Location
3:19.03	August 2, 1984	1984 Summer Olympics	Los Angeles, California
3:17.08	August 18, 1985	1985 Pan Pacific Championships	Tokyo, Japan

Men's 4×200-meter freestyle relay

Time	Date	Event	Location
7:15.69	July 30, 1984	1984 Summer Olympics	Los Angeles, California

== See also ==
- List of multiple Olympic gold medalists
- List of University of Florida Olympians
- List of University of Florida Athletic Hall of Fame members
- List of World Aquatics Championships medalists in swimming (men)
- World record progression 4 × 100 metres freestyle relay
- World record progression 4 × 200 metres freestyle relay
