= David Larson (swimmer) =

American swimmer

Personal information
- Full name: David Erwin Larson
- National team: United States
- Born: June 25, 1959 (age 67) Jesup, Georgia, U.S.
- Height: 6 ft 2.5 in (1.90 m)
- Weight: 174 lb (79 kg)

Sport
- Sport: Swimming
- Strokes: Freestyle
- College team: University of Florida
Medal record
Men's swimming
Representing the United States
Olympic Games
Gold medal – first place	1984 Los Angeles	4×200 m freestyle
Pan American Games
Gold medal – first place	1979 San Juan	4×200 m freestyle
Gold medal – first place	1983 Caracas	4×200 m freestyle
Silver medal – second place	1979 San Juan	200 m freestyle

David Erwin Larson (born June 25, 1959) is an American former competition swimmer who is an Olympic gold medalist and former world record-holder. Larson is a Georgia native who became an All-American college swimmer for the University of Florida. He was known for his success as a member of American relay teams in international competition at the Pan American Games and the Olympics – and for setting two world records in the 4×200-meter relay event on the same day at the 1984 Olympics.

== Early years ==
Larson was born in the small town of Jesup, Georgia in 1959. He started swimming as an age-group competitor in 1963. He attended the Bolles School in Jacksonville, Florida, where he swam for the Bolles high school swim team. He graduated from Bolles in 1977.

== College swimming career ==
Larson accepted an athletic scholarship to attend the University of Florida in Gainesville, Florida, where he swam for the Florida Gators swimming and diving team in National Collegiate Athletic Association (NCAA) and Southeastern Conference (SEC) competition under coach Randy Reese from 1978 to 1981. Larson won two NCAA championships at Florida in the 800-yard freestyle relay (1979, 1981), setting American and NCAA records in the process. He finished second in the 200-yard freestyle to Rowdy Gaines of Auburn in 1981, but then out-swam Gaines on the final leg of the 800-yard freestyle relay to claim the NCAA championship in the event. Larson earned twenty-one All-American honors and was national record holder in the 400-yard freestyle relay.

Larson graduated from the University of Florida with a bachelor's degree in sociology in 1987, and was later inducted into the University of Florida Athletic Hall of Fame as a "Gator Great."

== International swimming career ==
Larson was first selected for the U.S. national swim team for the 1979 Pan American Games held in San Juan, Puerto Rico. In what would become a regular match-up, Larson earned a silver medal in the men's 200-meter freestyle for his second-place finish (1:52.24) behind American teammate Rowdy Gaines (1:51.22). Two days later, Larson and Gaines combined with fellow Americans Brian Goodell and Kris Kirchner to win a Pan American Games gold medal in the 4×200-meter freestyle relay (7:31.28).

He qualified for the U.S. Olympic Team in 1980, as a member of the U.S. team in the men's 4×200-meter freestyle relay, but was unable to compete because of the United States-led boycott of the 1980 Summer Olympics held in Moscow. After completing his college career in 1981, Larson was tired of swimming and quit, only to return to competition a year later because he missed the focus. Larson continued his training with the program that coach Randy Reese had created for post-college swimmers in Gainesville, Florida.

At the 1983 Pan American Games in Caracas, Venezuela, he again won a gold medal as a member of the winning U.S. team in the men's 200-meter freestyle relay, together with Richard Saeger, Bruce Hayes and Rowdy Gaines (7:23.63).

Larson represented the United States at the 1984 Summer Olympics in Los Angeles. In the preliminary heats of the men's 4×200-meter freestyle relay, he and U.S. teammates Geoff Gaberino, Hayes and Saeger set a new world record of 7:18.87. But the new record was short-lived. Later that same afternoon, Larson won the gold medal in the event final of the 4×200-meter freestyle relay, together with his American teammates Mike Heath, Jeff Float and Hayes, by defeating the Michael Gross-anchored West German team by four one-hundredths (0.04) of a second, and setting yet another new world record of 7:15.69 in the process. The American media dubbed the four swimmers the "Gross Busters," a play on the title of the popular 1984 movie Ghostbusters.

In the aftermath of the 1984 Olympics, Larson retired from competitive swimming at the age of 25.

== Life after swimming ==
After the post-Olympic national celebrations, Larson was offered an opportunity to work in sports marketing in New York City. His early professional career involved dealings with agents, creating event sponsorships, and negotiating athlete contracts. He spent the next decade working in sports marketing, then in television. He worked with NBC on its Olympic broadcasts, including the 2005 Winter Games.

Larson and his wife Kitty, a Miami lawyer, have a son.

== World records ==
Men's 4×200-meter medley relay

Time	Date	Event	Location
7:18.87	July 30, 1984	1984 Summer Olympics	Los Angeles, California
7:15.69	July 30, 1984	1984 Summer Olympics	Los Angeles, California

== See also ==
- List of Olympic medalists in swimming (men)
- List of United States records in swimming
- List of University of Florida alumni
- List of University of Florida Athletic Hall of Fame members
- List of University of Florida Olympians
- World record progression 4 × 200 metres freestyle relay

== Bibliography ==
- Caraccioli, Jerry, & Tom Caraccioli, Boycott: Stolen Dreams of the 1980 Moscow Olympic Games, New Chapter Press, Washington, D.C. (2009). ISBN 978-0-942257-54-0.
- De George, Matthew, Pooling Talent: Swimming's Greatest Teams, Rowman & Littlefield, Lanham, Maryland (2014). ISBN 978-1-4422-3701-8.
