= Swimming at the 1983 Pan American Games =

The Swimming Tournament at the 1983 Pan American Games took place in Caracas, Venezuela from August 17 to August 22, 1983.

Three world records were broken at this edition of the Games, all by U.S. swimmers.

== Men’s events ==
Event	Gold		Silver		Bronze	
100 m freestyle	Rowdy Gaines (USA)	50.38	Fernando Cañales (PUR)	50.43	Alberto Mestre (VEN)	51.09
200 m freestyle	Bruce Hayes (USA)	1:49.89	Alberto Mestre (VEN)	1:50.36	Rowdy Gaines (USA)	1:51.27
400 m freestyle	Bruce Hayes (USA)	3:53.17	Matt Cetlinski (USA)	3:53.51	Marcelo Jucá (BRA)	3:55.66
1500 m freestyle	Jeff Kostoff (USA)	15:30.67	Marcelo Jucá (BRA)	15:33.01	Carlos Scanavino (URU)	15:36.07
100 m backstroke	Rick Carey (USA)	55.19; WR	Dave Bottom (USA)	56.90	Mike West (CAN)	57.20
200 m backstroke	Rick Carey (USA)	1:59.34	Ricardo Prado (BRA)	2:02.85	Mike West (CAN)	2:03.11
100 m breaststroke	Steve Lundquist (USA)	1:02.28; WR	John Moffet (USA)	1:02.36	Pablo Restrepo (COL)	1:03.89
200 m breaststroke	Steve Lundquist (USA)	2:19.31	Pablo Restrepo (COL)	2:20.21	Doug Soltis (USA)	2:20.89
100 m butterfly	Matt Gribble (USA)	54.25	Pablo Morales (USA)	54.62	Rafael Vidal (VEN)	54.72
200 m butterfly	Craig Beardsley (USA)	1:58.85	Ricardo Prado (BRA)	1:59.00	Rafael Vidal (VEN)	1:59.17
200 m individual medley	Ricardo Prado (BRA)	2:04.51	Bill Barrett (USA)	2:04.90	Steve Lundquist (USA)	2:06.36
400 m individual medley	Ricardo Prado (BRA)	4:21.43	Jeff Kostoff (USA)	4:27.99	Mike O'Brien (USA)	4:30.45
4 × 100 m freestyle relay	UNITED STATES; Robin Leamy; Matt Gribble; Chris Cavanaugh; Rowdy Gaines	3:21.41	BRAZIL; Ronald Menezes; Jorge Fernandes; Djan Madruga; Cyro Delgado	3:27.59	VENEZUELA; Jean François; Antonio Sánchez; Rafael Vidal; Alberto Mestre	3:29.06
4 × 200 m freestyle relay	UNITED STATES; David Larson; Richard Saeger; Bruce Hayes; Rowdy Gaines	7:23.63	BRAZIL; Djan Madruga; Marcelo Jucá; Cyro Delgado; Jorge Fernandes	7:32.78	VENEZUELA; Jean François; Antonio Sánchez; Rafael Vidal; Alberto Mestre	7:33.82
4 × 100 m medley relay	UNITED STATES; Rick Carey; Steve Lundquist; Matt Gribble; Rowdy Gaines	3:40.42; WR	CANADA; Mike West; Marco Veilleux; Tom Ponting; David Churchill	3:48.10	VENEZUELA; Giovanni Frigo; Glen Sochasky; Rafael Vidal; Alberto Mestre	3:50.52

== Women’s events ==
Event	Gold		Silver		Bronze	
100 m freestyle	Carrie Steinseifer (USA)	56.92	Jane Kerr (CAN)	57.51	Kathy Bald (CAN)	57.76
200 m freestyle	Cynthia Woodhead (USA)	2:01.33	Mary Wayte (USA)	2:02.21	Julie Daigneault (CAN)	2:02.36
400 m freestyle	Tiffany Cohen (USA)	4:12.27	Cynthia Woodhead (USA)	4:14.07	Julie Daigneault (CAN)	4:19.91
800 m freestyle	Tiffany Cohen (USA)	8:35.42	Marybeth Linzmeier (USA)	8:41.26	Julie Daigneault (CAN)	8:59.52
100 m backstroke	Susan Walsh (USA)	1:02.48	Joan Pennington (USA)	1:03.63	Barbara McBain (CAN)	1:05.38
200 m backstroke	Amy White (USA)	2:15.66	Susan Walsh (USA)	2:15.94	Barbara McBain (CAN)	2:18.93
100 m breaststroke	Anne Ottenbrite (CAN)	1:10.63	Kathy Bald (CAN)	1:11.98	Kim Rhodenbaugh (USA)	1:12.16
200 m breaststroke	Kathy Bald (CAN)	2:35.53	Susan Rapp (USA)	2:37.91	Kim Rhodenbaugh (USA)	2:39.03
100 m butterfly	Laurie Lehner (USA)	1:01.14	Michelle MacPherson (CAN)	1:01.63	Patty King (USA)	1:01.96
200 m butterfly	Mary T. Meagher (USA)	2:10.06	Tracy Caulkins (USA)	2:14.15	Marie Moore (CAN)	2:14.51
200 m individual medley	Tracy Caulkins (USA)	2:16.22	Michelle MacPherson (CAN)	2:18.22	Susan Rapp (USA)	2:18.76
400 m individual medley	Tracy Caulkins (USA)	4:51.82	Polly Winde (USA)	4:54.11	Michelle MacPherson (CAN)	4:54.86
4 × 100 m freestyle relay	UNITED STATES; Jill Sterkel; Dara Torres; Mary Wayte; Carrie Steinseifer	3:46.46	CANADA; Carol Klimpel; Kathy Bald; Pamela Rai; Jane Kerr	3:49.49	MEXICO; Patricia Kohlmann; Rosa Fuentes; Irma Huerta; Teresa Rivera	4:00.43
4 × 100 m medley relay	UNITED STATES; Susan Walsh; Kim Rhodenbaugh; Laurie Lehner; Carrie Steinseifer	4:12.99	CANADA; Barbara McBain; Anne Ottenbrite; Michelle MacPherson; Jane Kerr	4:13.84	MEXICO; Teresa Rivera; Silvia Rivero; Aida Huerta; Patricia Kohlmann	4:30.72

== Medal table ==
Rank	Nation	Gold	Silver	Bronze	Total
1	United States	25	14	8	47
2	Canada	2	7	10	19
3	Brazil	2	5	1	8
4	Venezuela	0	1	6	7
5	Colombia	0	1	1	2
6	Puerto Rico	0	1	0	1
7	Mexico	0	0	2	2
8	Uruguay	0	0	1	1
Totals (8 entries)		29	29	29	87
