= Benoit Clément =

Canadian swimmer (1963–2011)

Personal information
- Born: 31 December 1963 Montreal, Quebec, Canada
- Died: 23 July 2011 (aged 47)

Sport
- Sport: Swimming

Benoit Clément (31 December 1963 – 23 July 2011) was a Canadian swimmer. He competed in the men's 4 × 200 metre freestyle relay at the 1984 Summer Olympics. He competed for the University of Michigan from 1982 through 1985. Afterwards he competed in Masters Swimming in Canada.
