= Paul Howe =

British swimmer

Personal information
- Full name: Paul Anthony Howe
- National team: Great Britain
- Born: 8 January 1968 (age 58) Singapore
- Height: 1.83 m (6 ft 0 in)
- Weight: 81 kg (179 lb; 12.8 st)

Sport
- Sport: Swimming
- Strokes: Freestyle
- Club: Birmingham and Phoenicians; Arizona State Sun Devils
Medal record
Men's swimming
Representing Great Britain
Olympic Games
Bronze medal – third place	1984 Los Angeles	4x200 m freestyle
Representing England
Commonwealth Games
Bronze medal – third place	1986 Edinburgh	4×200 m freestyle

Paul Howe (born 8 January 1968) is a Singapore-born former competitive swimmer and freestyler.

== Swimming career ==
He represented Great Britain in the Olympics and England in the Commonwealth Games. He competed in three consecutive Olympic Games, starting at the 1984 Summer Olympics in Los Angeles, California. There he claimed the bronze medal in the 4×200-metre freestyle relay, alongside teammates Neil Cochran, Paul Easter, and Andrew Astbury. He represented England and won a bronze medal in the 4 x 200 metres freestyle relay, at the 1986 Commonwealth Games in Edinburgh, Scotland. Four years later he represented England in the 200 metres freestyle and relay, at the 1990 Commonwealth Games in Auckland, New Zealand.

He is a three times winner of the ASA National British Championships in the 200 metres freestyle (1990-1992) and a three times winner of the 400 metres freestyle in 1988, 1990 and 1991. He also won the 200 metres butterfly title in 1990.

== Personal ==
Howe attended Millfield School from 1983 to 1986.

== See also ==
- List of Commonwealth Games medallists in swimming (men)
- List of Olympic medalists in swimming (men)
