= Sandy Goss =

Canadian swimmer (born 1968)

Personal information
- Full name: Donald Alexander Goss
- Nickname: "Sandy"
- National team: Canada
- Born: 2 October 1966 (age 59) Amherst, Nova Scotia, Canada
- Height: 1.93 m (6 ft 4 in)
- Weight: 89 kg (196 lb)

Sport
- Sport: Swimming
- Strokes: Freestyle, backstroke
- Club: North York Aquatic Club
- College team: University of Florida
Medal record
Men's swimming
Representing Canada
Olympic Games
Silver medal – second place	1984 Los Angeles	4x100 m medley
Silver medal – second place	1988 Seoul	4x100 m medley
Pan Pacific Games
Silver medal – second place	1991 Edmonton	4x100 m medley
Bronze medal – third place	1985 Tokyo	200 m freestyle
Bronze medal – third place	1991 Edmonton	4x100 m freestyle
Commonwealth Games
Gold medal – first place	1986 Edinburgh	200 m backstroke
Gold medal – first place	1986 Edinburgh	4x100 m medley
Silver medal – second place	1986 Edinburgh	4x100 m freestyle
Silver medal – second place	1986 Edinburgh	4x200 m freestyle

Donald Alexander Goss (born 2 October 1966), nicknamed Sandy Goss, is a former competition swimmer from Canada. Goss was a freestyle and backstroke specialist who was an Olympic silver medalist.

== Early years ==
Goss was born in Amherst, Nova Scotia in 1968. At the age of 8, Goss' family moved to Toronto and he began swimming for the North York Aquatic Club. At age 11, he was a member of the Canadian tour team that traveled to Germany and won two silver medals. At 17, Goss set a new short-course world record in the 200-metres backstroke at the Canadian Nationals.

== College career ==
Goss received an athletic scholarship to attend the University of Florida in Gainesville, Florida, where he swam for the Florida Gators swimming and diving team in National Collegiate Athletic Association (NCAA) competition under coach Randy Reese from 1987 to 1990. Goss, together with Duffy Dillon, Paul Robinson and Troy Dalbey, won the NCAA national championship in the 4x200-metre freestyle relay in 1987. He also won three Southeastern Conference (SEC) individual championships in the 100-metre backstroke (1987) and the 200-metre backstroke (1987, 1988), as well as seven SEC championships as a member of winning Gators relay teams. Goss received twenty-three All-American honors during his four-year American college swimming career. He graduated from the University of Florida with a bachelor's degree in marketing in 1991.

== International career ==
Goss represented Canada at the 1984 Summer Olympics in Los Angeles, California. In 1984, he won a silver medal with the Canadian team by swimming the freestyle anchor leg in the men's 4x100-metre medley relay. Goss was also a member of Canada's fifth-place team in the 4x200-metre freestyle relay, and seventh-place team in the men's 4x100-metre freestyle relay. Individually, he placed seventh in the 100-metre backstroke.

Four years later, he again swam for Canada in four events at the 1988 Summer Olympics in Seoul, South Korea. He again earned a silver medal by swimming the freestyle leg for Canada's second-place team in the 4x100-metre medley relay. He was also a member of the Canadian eighth-place team in the 4x200-metre freestyle relay, and ninth-place team in the men's 4x100-metre freestyle relay. In individual competition, he advanced to the semifinals of the 100-metre freestyle, and finished with the tenth best time overall.

He was a double gold medalist at the 1986 Commonwealth Games in Edinburgh, Scotland, winning championships in the 200-metre backstroke and 4x100-metre medley relay, and also won silver medals as a member of the second-place Canadian teams in the 4x100-metre freestyle relay and 4x200-metre freestyle relay.

== Life after swimming ==
Goss and Jane Kerr were inducted into the Swimming Canada Circle of Excellence Hall of Fame in 2006. He lives in Toronto with his wife Judy, with whom he has two children, including competitive swimmer Kennedy Goss, who was named to Canada's Olympic team in 2016 and won a bronze medal in the women's 4 x 200 metre freestyle relay. As of 2006, he was working as a stock broker for Research Capital in Toronto.

== See also ==
- List of Commonwealth Games medallists in swimming (men)
- List of Olympic medalists in swimming (men)
- List of University of Florida alumni
- List of University of Florida Olympians
