= Neil Cochran =

British swimmer and Olympic bronze medallist (born 1965)

Personal information
- Nationality: British (Scottish)
- Born: 12 April 1965 (age 61) Torphins, Scotland
- Height: 1.74 m (5 ft 9 in)
- Weight: 70 kg (154 lb; 11 st 0 lb)

Sport
- Sport: Swimming
- Strokes: Freestyle, medley
- Club: City of Aberdeen / later City of Swansea
Medal record
Men's swimming
Representing Great Britain
Olympic Games
Bronze medal – third place	1984 Los Angeles	200 m medley
Bronze medal – third place	1984 Los Angeles	4×200 m freestyle
European Championships (LC)
Silver medal – second place	1987 Strasbourg	4×100 m medley
Summer Universiade
Gold medal – first place	1987 Zagreb	200 m medley
Representing Scotland
Commonwealth Games
Bronze medal – third place	1982 Brisbane	4x200 m freestyle
Bronze medal – third place	1986 Edinburgh	200 m medley

Neil Cochran (born 12 April 1965) is a Scottish former competitive swimmer who represented Great Britain in the Olympics, European championships and World University Games, and swam for Scotland in the Commonwealth Games, during the 1980s. Cochran competed in medley and freestyle swimming events.

== Swimming career ==
As a 17-year-old, when coached by Wally Lord at Aberdeen Swimming Club. In July 1981 set a Scottish national junior record over 200 metres backstroke with a time of 2 min 10.08 sec. He was selected to race for Scotland at the 1982 Commonwealth Games in Brisbane, Australia. He won a bronze medal as a member of the third-place Scottish team in the men's 4x200-metre freestyle relay, alongside Douglas Campbell, Graeme Wilson and Paul Easter, finishing behind the Australian and English teams. Living in North Deeside Road, Aberdeen at the time, he was a guest of honour at a reception hosted by the Lord Provost at the Aberdeen Town House to celebrate the Scottish swim team success at the Games.

At the 1984 Summer Olympics in Los Angeles, California, he won two bronze medals. He was a member of the third-place British team in the men's 4×200-metre freestyle relay, alongside Paul Easter, Paul Howe and Andrew Astbury, finishing behind the Americans and West Germans. In individual competition, he won a second bronze in the 200-metre individual medley, coming third after Canadian Alex Baumann and American Pablo Morales. He also advanced to the B Final of the 200-metre backstroke, finishing fourteenth overall.

Swimming for Scotland at the 1986 Commonwealth Games in Edinburgh, he won a bronze in the 200-metre individual medley and competed in the 200 metre freestyle, 100 metre backstroke, 200 metre backstroke, 4x100 metre freestyle relay and 4x200 metre freestyle relay. He won a gold medal in the 200-metre individual medley at the 1987 Summer Universiade, and a silver as a member of the British men's team in the 4x100-metre medley relay at the 1987 European Championships.

When Seoul, South Korea hosted the 1988 Summer Olympics, Cochran qualified in three individual events. He was eliminated in the preliminary heats of the men's 100-metre backstroke, but advanced to the B Finals of the 100-metre butterfly and 200-metre individual medley, finishing sixteenth and eleventh, respectively.

At the ASA National British Championships he won the 100 metres backstroke title in 1988, the 100 metres butterfly title in 1987 and the 200 metres butterfly title in 1987.

== See also ==
- List of Commonwealth Games medallists in swimming (men)
- List of Olympic medalists in swimming (men)
