= List of University of Florida Olympians =

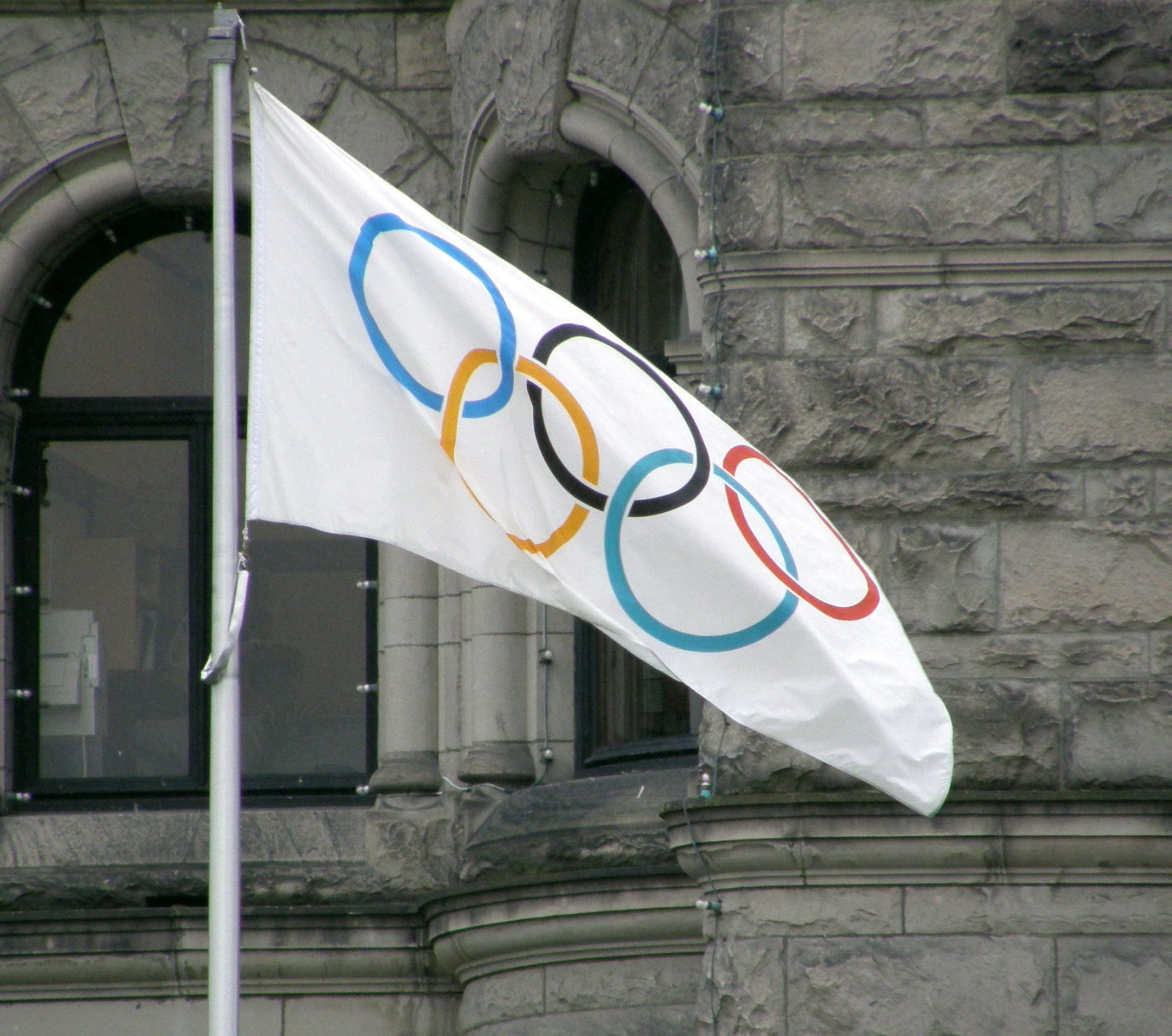
Florida Gators in the Olympic Games

This List of University of Florida Olympians includes over 150 students and alumni of the University of Florida who have competed or coached in the Olympic Games, as well as current or former Florida Gators coaches who have coached in the Olympics. The list includes such notable athletes as swimmer Tracy Caulkins, a three-time gold medalist, swimmer Ryan Lochte, a five-time gold medalist and winner of eleven medals, and distance runner Frank Shorter, a graduate of the College of Law and the first American to win an Olympic gold medal in the marathon.

Swimmer Catie Ball was the first University of Florida alumna to win an Olympic medal, but she did so while she was still a high school student and before she enrolled in the university. Ball was a gold medalist in the 200-meter butterfly who later became the first head coach of the Florida Gators women's swimming and diving team while she was still a university undergraduate. Swimmer Tim McKee was the first University of Florida alumnus to win an Olympic medal while he was still an undergraduate and a current member of a Florida Gators varsity sports team. McKee won silver medals in the 200- and 400-meter individual medley events.

To date, the most successful Gator Olympian is Dara Torres, a twelve-time medalist and the first American swimmer to ever compete in five Olympics.

== Baseball ==
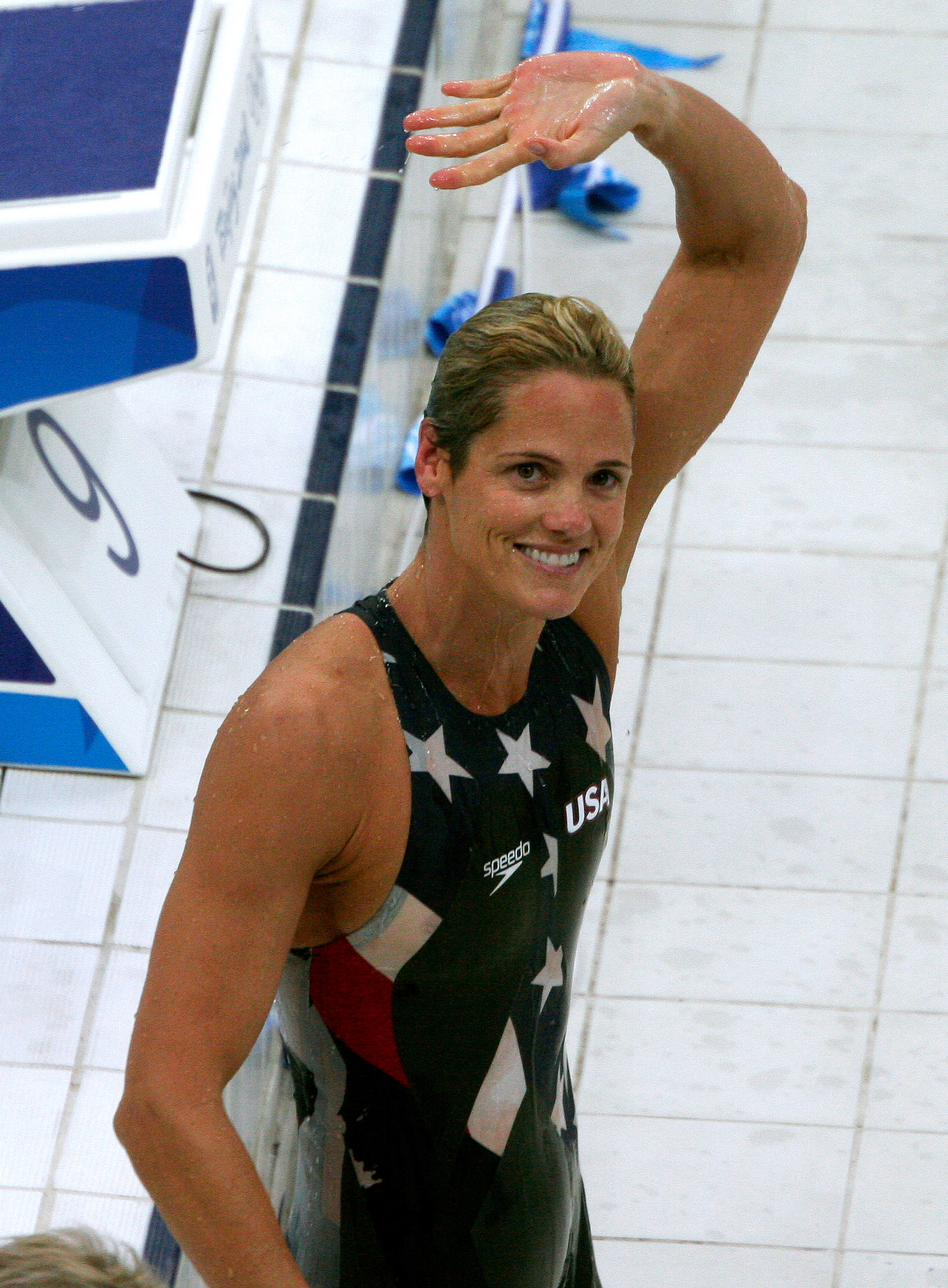
Dara Torres

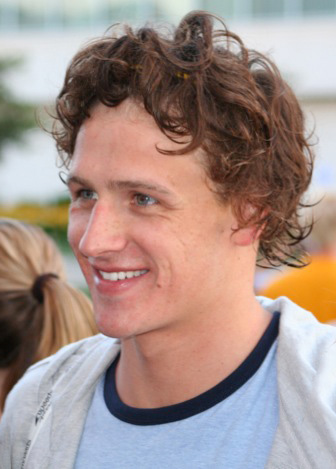
Ryan Lochte

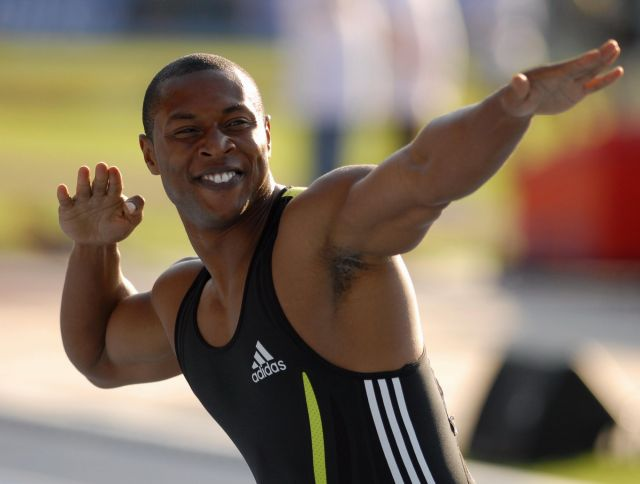
Bernard Williams

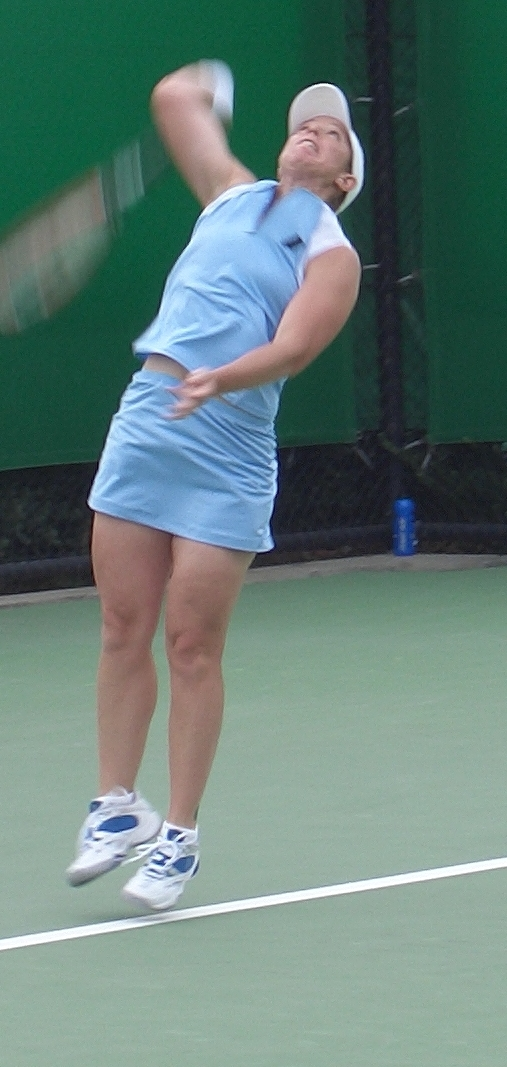
Lisa Raymond

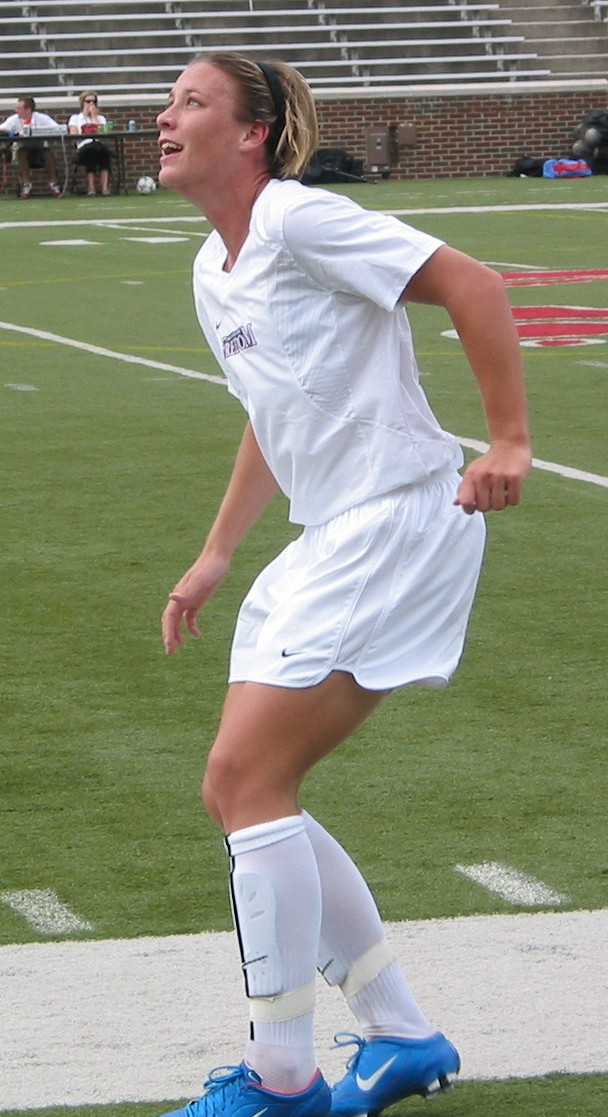
Abby Wambach

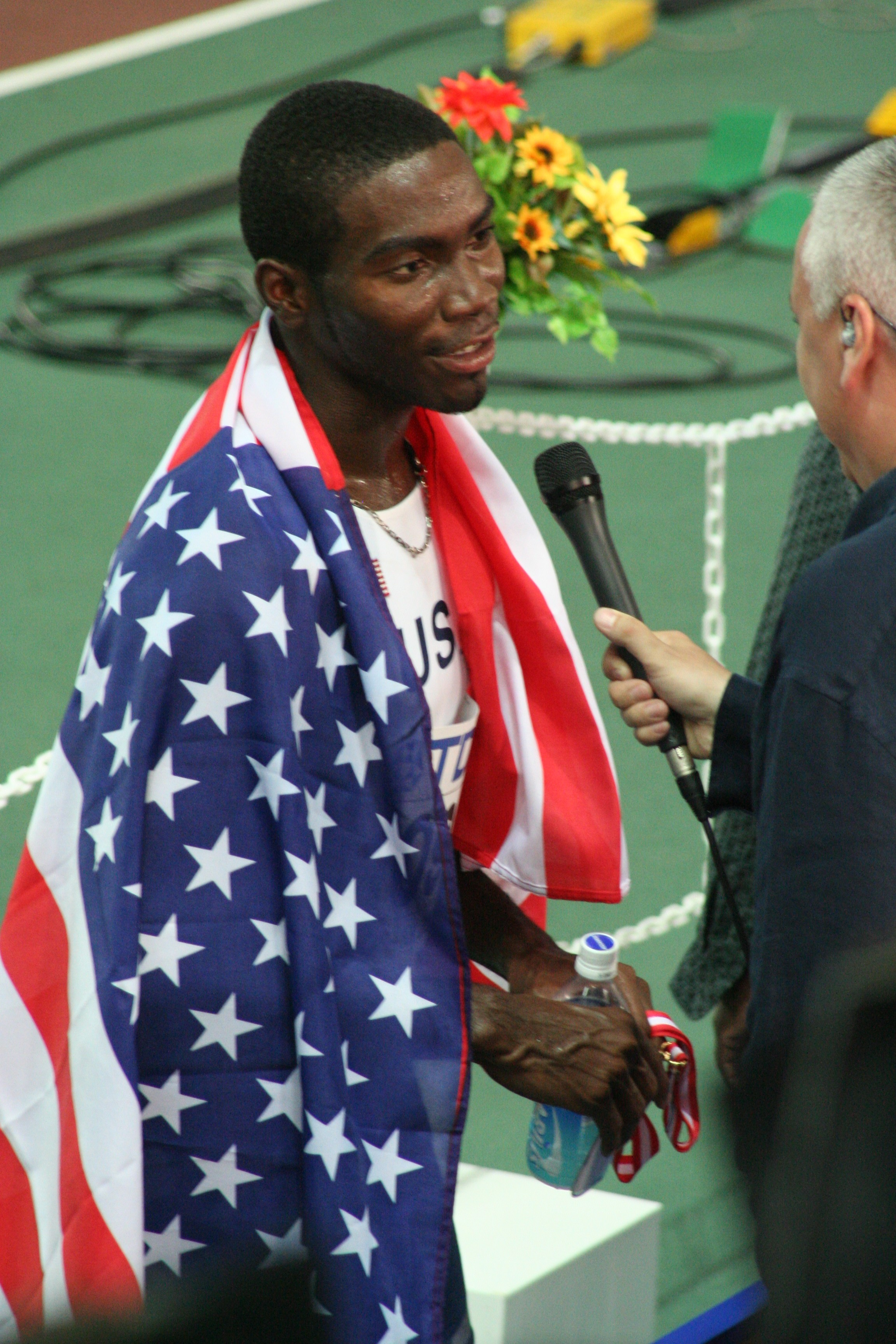
Kerron Clement

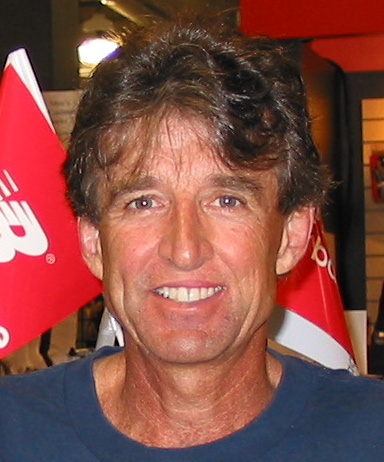
Frank Shorter

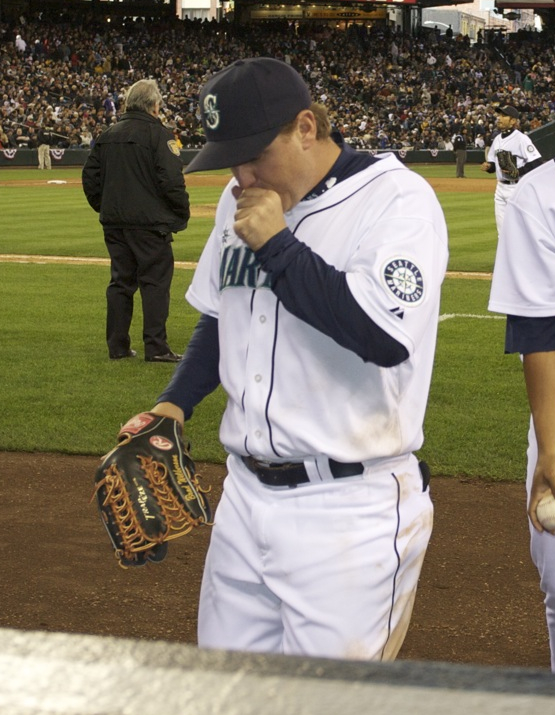
Brad Wilkerson

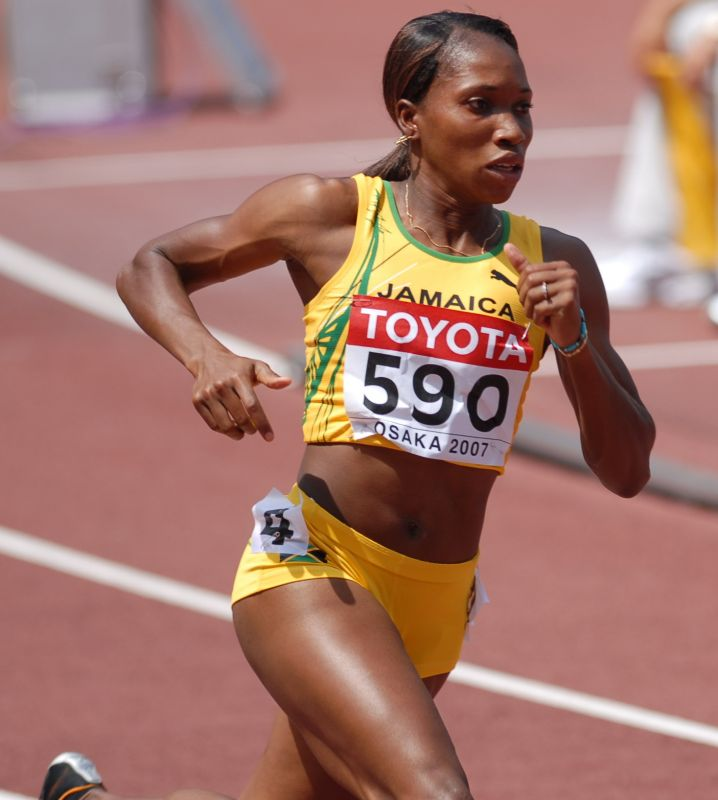
Novlene Williams

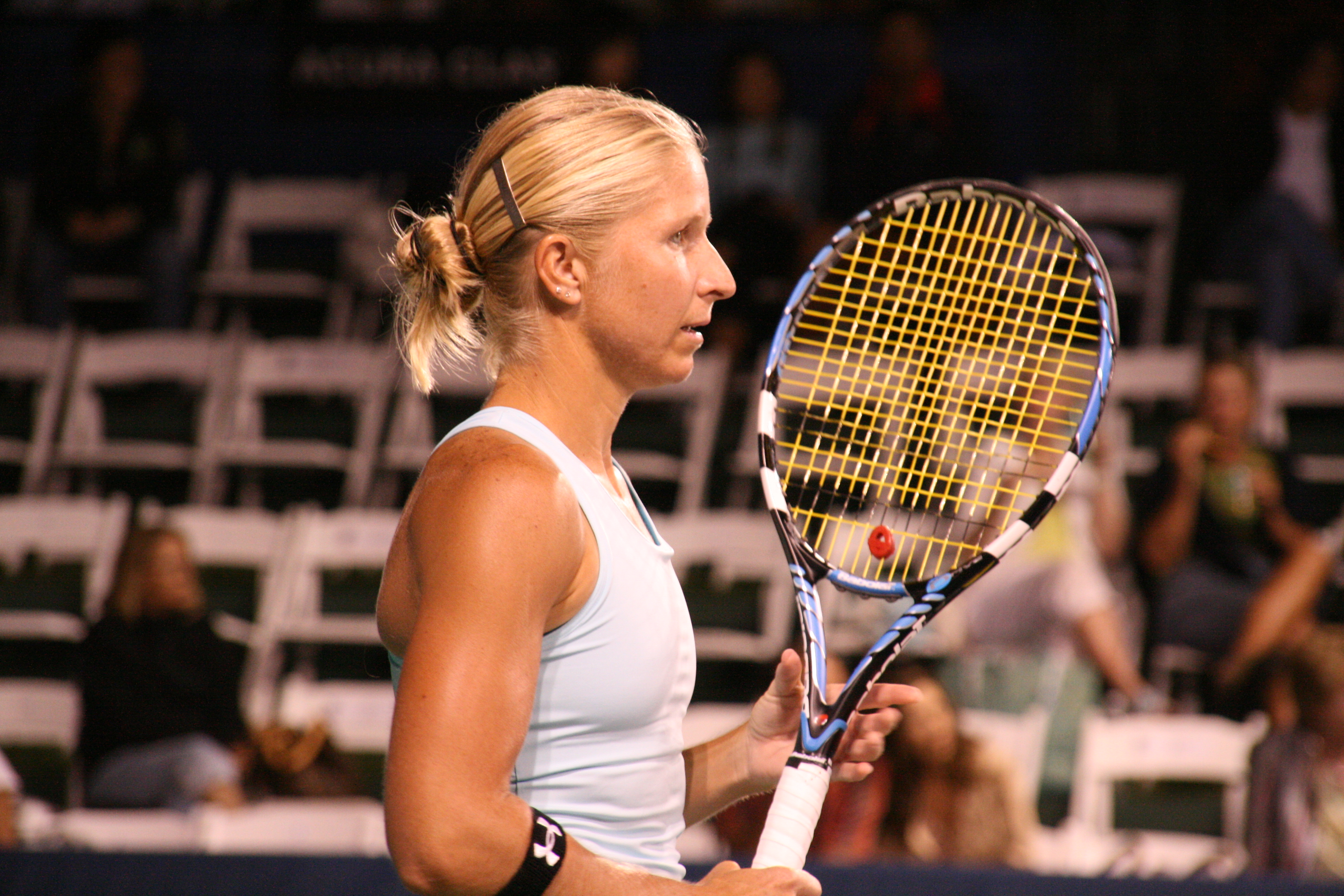
Jill Craybas

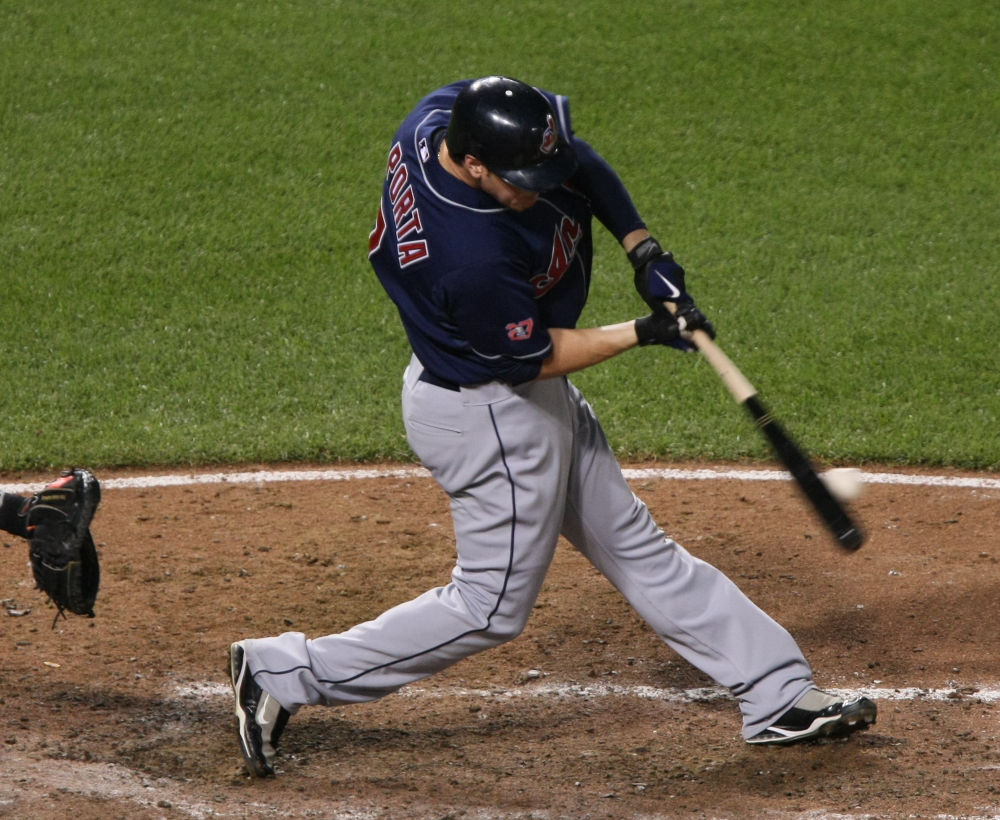
Matt LaPorta

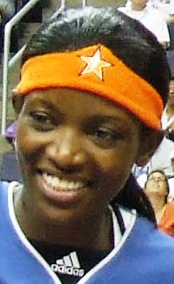
DeLisha Milton-Jones

- Matthew LaPorta, American bronze medalist at 2008 Beijing Olympics
- Brad Wilkerson, American gold medalist at 2000 Sydney Olympics

== Basketball ==
- Tammy Jackson, American bronze medalist at 1992 Barcelona Olympics
- DeLisha Milton-Jones, American gold medalist at 2000 Sydney Olympics, gold medalist at 2008 Beijing Olympics

== Beach volleyball ==
- Gudula Staub, German team member at 2000 Sydney Olympics

== Bobsled ==
- John Amabile, Puerto Rican team member at 1992 Albertville Olympics, 1994 Lillehammer Olympics, and 1998 Nagano Olympics
- Liston Bochette, Puerto Rican team member at 1992 Albertville Olympics, 1994 Lillehammer Olympics, and 1998 Nagano Olympics
- Steve Mesler, American team member at 2002 Salt Lake City Olympics and 2006 Turin Olympics, and gold medalist at 2010 Vancouver Olympics

== Cycling ==
- Jeanne Golay, American team member at 1992 Barcelona Olympics and 1996 Atlanta Olympics
- Andrew Weaver, American team member at 1980 Moscow Olympics, and bronze medalist at 1984 Los Angeles Olympics

== Diving ==
- Debbie Fuller, Canadian team member at 1984 Los Angeles Olympics and 1988 Seoul Olympics
- Tom LeMaire, Belgian team member at 1984 Los Angeles Olympics
- Melisa Moses, American team member at 1996 Atlanta Olympics
- Megan Neyer, American team member, 1980 Moscow Olympics
- Chris Snode, British team member at 1976 Montreal Olympics, 1980 Moscow Olympics, and 1984 Los Angeles Olympics

== Gymnastics ==
- Anita Boten, Canadian team member at 1984 Los Angeles Olympics
- Marissa King, British team member at 2008 Beijing Olympics
- Christina McDonald, Canadian team member at 1988 Seoul Olympics
- Raegan Rutty, Cayman Islands team member at the 2020 Tokyo Olympics
- Bridget Sloan, American silver medalist at 2008 Beijing Olympics
- Nicola Willis, British team member at 2004 Athens Olympics
- Lynette Wittmeier, Canadian team member at 1988 Seoul Olympics

== Handball ==
- Harry Winkler, American team member at 1972 Munich Olympics, 1976 Montreal Olympics, and 1984 Los Angeles Olympics

== Judo ==
- Colleen Rosensteel, American team member at 1992 Barcelona Olympics, 1996 Atlanta Olympics, and 2000 Sydney Olympics

== Soccer ==
- Melanie Booth, Canadian bronze medalist at the 2012 London Olympics
- Adriana Leon, Canadian gold medalist at 2020 Tokyo Olympics
- Heather Mitts, American gold medalist at 2004 Athens Olympics, 2008 Beijing Olympics, and 2012 London Olympics
- Deanne Rose, Canadian bronze medalist at 2016 Rio Olympics and gold medalist at 2020 Tokyo Olympics
- Abby Wambach, American gold medalist at 2004 Athens Olympics and 2012 London Olympics

== Speed skating ==
- Erin Jackson, American gold medalist at the 2022 Beijing Olympics

== Swimming ==
- Bradley Ally, Barbados team member at 2004 Athens Olympics and 2008 Beijing Olympics
- Amro Al-Wir, Jordanian team member at 2020 Tokyo Olympics and 2024 Paris Olympics
- Theresa Andrews, American gold medalist at 1984 Los Angeles Olympics
- Duncan Armstrong, Australian gold medalist at 1988 Seoul Olympics
- Janelle Atkinson, Jamaican team member at 2000 Sydney Olympics and 2004 Athens Olympics
- Catie Ball, American gold medalist at 1968 Mexico City Olympics
- Jose Ballester, Spanish team member at 1988 Seoul Olympics and 1992 Barcelona Olympics
- Sarah Bateman, Iceland team member at 2008 Beijing Olympics and 2012 London Olympics
- Craig Beardsley, American team member qualified for 1980 Moscow Olympics
- Elizabeth Beisel, American team member at 2008 Beijing Olympics, silver medalist and bronze medalist at 2012 London Olympics
- Vipa Bernhardt, German team member at 2004 Athens Olympics
- Rosemary Brown, Australian team member at 1980 Moscow Olympics
- Tami Bruce, American team member at 1988 Seoul Olympics
- Carlton Bruner, American team member at 1996 Atlanta Olympics
- Caroline Burckle, American bronze medalist at 2008 Beijing Olympics
- Clark Burckle, American team member at 2012 London Olympics
- Rex Tullius, United States Virgin Islands team member at 2016 Rio Olympics
- Greg Burgess, American silver medalist at 1992 Barcelona Olympics, and team member at 1996 Atlanta Olympics
- Tracy Caulkins, American team member, qualified for 1980 Moscow Olympics, gold medalist at 1984 Los Angeles Olympics
- Matt Cetlinski, American gold medalist at 1988 Seoul Olympics
- Stephen Clarke, Canadian bronze medalist at 1992 Barcelona Olympics, and team member at 1996 Atlanta Olympics
- Melania Costa Schmid, Spanish team member at 2008 Beijing Olympics and 2012 London Olympics
- Emmanuel Crescimbeni, Peruvian team member at 2008 Beijing Olympics
- Troy Dalbey, American gold medalist at 1988 Seoul Olympics
- Rodion Davelaar, Netherlands Antilles team member at 2008 Beijing Olympics
- Frédéric Delcourt, French team member at 1980 Moscow Olympics, and silver medalist at 1984 Los Angeles Olympics
- Caeleb Dressel, American gold medalist at 2016 Rio Olympics, gold medalist at 2020 Tokyo Olympics, and gold medalist at 2024 Paris Olympics
- Nikki Dryden, Canadian team member at 1992 Barcelona Olympics and 1996 Atlanta Olympics
- Conor Dwyer, American gold medalist at the 2012 London Olympics
- Mercedes Farhat, Libyan team member at 2008 Beijing Olympics
- Bárbara Franco, Spanish team member at 1992 Barcelona Olympics and 1996 Atlanta Olympics
- Claudia Franco, Spanish team member at 1992 Barcelona Olympics and 1996 Atlanta Olympics
- Lisa Forrest, Australian team member at 1980 Moscow Olympics
- Brett Fraser, Cayman Islands team member at 2008 Beijing Olympics and 2012 London Olympics
- Shaune Fraser, Cayman Islands team member at 2004 Athens Olympics, 2008 Beijing Olympics and 2012 London Olympics
- Bobby Finke, American gold medalist at 2020 Tokyo Olympics, and silver medalist at 2024 Paris Olympics
- Geoff Gaberino, American gold medalist at 1984 Los Angeles Olympics
- Balázs Gercsák, Hungarian team member at 2008 Beijing Olympics
- Chuy Gonzalez, Mexican team member at 1996 Atlanta Olympics
- Sandy Goss, Canadian silver medalist at 1984 Los Angeles Olympics, and silver medalist at 1988 Seoul Olympics
- Nicole Haislett, American gold medalist at 1992 Barcelona Olympics
- Beth Hazel, Canadian team member at 1992 Barcelona Olympics
- Mike Heath, American gold medalist and silver medalist at 1984 Los Angeles Olympics
- Whitney Hedgepeth, American team member at 1988 Seoul Olympics, gold medalist and silver medalist at 1996 Atlanta Olympics
- Jill Horstead, Canadian team member at 1984 Los Angeles Olympics
- Carlos Jayme, Brazilian bronze medalist at 2000 Sydney Olympics, and team member 2004 Athens Olympics
- Patrick Kennedy, American team member at 1984 Los Angeles Olympics
- Jane Kerr, Canadian team member at 1984 Los Angeles Olympics, and bronze medalist at 1988 Seoul Olympics
- Bryan Kim, South Korean team member at 1996 Atlanta Olympics, 2000 Sydney Olympics, and 2004 Athens Olympics
- Renee Laravie, American team member at 1976 Montreal Olympics
- David Larson, American team member, qualified for 1980 Moscow Olympics, and gold medalist at 1984 Los Angeles Olympics
- Nuno Laurentino, Portuguese team member at 2000 Sydney Olympics
- Joshua Liendo, Canadian silver medalist at 2024 Paris Olympics
- Enrico Linscheer, Surinamese team member at 1992 Barcelona Olympics and 1996 Atlanta Olympics
- Giovanni Linscheer, Surinamese team member at 1992 Barcelona Olympics and 1996 Atlanta Olympics
- Ryan Lochte, American gold medalist and silver medalist at 2004 Athens Olympics, gold medalist and bronze medalist at the 2008 Beijing Olympics, and gold, silver and bronze medalist at the 2012 London Olympics
- Alex Lopez, Puerto Rican team member at 1996 Atlanta Olympics, 2000 Sydney Olympics, and 2004 Athens Olympics
- Lea Loveless, American gold medalist and silver medalist at 1992 Barcelona Olympics
- Jemma Lowe, British team member at 2008 Beijing Olympics and 2012 London Olympics
- Corey Main, New Zealand team member at 2016 Rio Olympics
- Gabriel Mangabeira, Brazilian team member at 2004 Athens Olympics
- Leah Martindale, Barbados team member at 2000 Sydney Olympics
- Tim McKee, American silver medalist at 1972 Munich Olympics, and silver medalist at 1976 Montreal Olympics
- Steve Mellor, British team member at 1992 Barcelona Olympics
- Alberto Mestre, Venezuelan team member 1980 Moscow Olympics and 1984 Los Angeles Olympics
- Whitney Metzler, American team member at 1996 Atlanta Olympics
- Theresa Michalak, German team member at 2012 London Olympics
- Ricardo Monasterio, Venezuelan team member at 1996 Atlanta Olympics, 2000 Sydney Olympics, and 2004 Athens Olympics
- Mauricio Moreno, Colombian team member at 1996 Atlanta Olympics
- Anthony Nesty, Surinamese gold medalist at 1988 Seoul Olympics, and bronze medalist at 1992 Barcelona Olympics
- Omar Pinzón, Colombian team member at 2004 Athens Olympics and 2008 Beijing Olympics
- Anna-Liisa Põld, Estonian team member at 2008 Beijing Olympics
- Wendy Quirk, Canadian team member at 1976 Montreal Olympics
- Stephanie Richardson, Canadian team member at 1996 Atlanta Olympics
- Sebastien Rousseau, South African team member at the 2008 Beijing Olympics, 2012 London Olympics
- Roland Rudolf, Hungarian team member at 2008 Beijing Olympics
- Sinead Russell, Canadian team member at 2012 London Olympics
- Jon Sakovich, Guam team member at 1988 Seoul Olympics
- Bill Sawchuk, Canadian team member at 1976 Montreal Olympics, qualified for 1980 Moscow Olympics
- Adam Sioui, Canadian team member at 2008 Beijing Olympics
- Kieran Smith, American bronze medalist at 2020 Tokyo Olympics, and silver medalist at 2024 Paris Olympics
- Gemma Spofforth, British team member at 2008 Beijing Olympics and 2012 London Olympics
- Mark Stockwell, Australian silver medalist and bronze medalist at 1984 Los Angeles Olympics
- Ashley Tappin, American gold medalist at 1992 Barcelona Olympics, and gold medalist at 2000 Sydney Olympics
- Dara Torres, American gold medalist at 1984 Los Angeles Olympics, silver medalist and bronze medalist at 1988 Seoul Olympics, gold medalist at 1992 Barcelona Olympics, gold medalist and bronze medalist at 2000 Sydney Olympics, and silver medalist at 2008 Beijing Olympics
- Darian Townsend, South African gold medalist at 2004 Athens Olympics
- Rafael Vidal, Venezuelan team member at 1980 Moscow Olympics, and bronze medalist at 1984 Los Angeles Olympics
- Dana Vollmer, American gold medalist at 2004 Athens Olympics, and gold medalist at the 2012 London Olympics
- Allison Wagner, American silver medalist at 1996 Atlanta Olympics
- Janie Wagstaff, American gold medalist at 1992 Barcelona Olympics
- Laura Walker, American bronze medalist at 1988 Seoul Olympics
- Dan Wallace, British silver medalist at 2016 Rio de Janeiro
- J.B. Walsh, Filipino team member at 2004 Athens Olympics and 2008 Beijing Olympics
- Mary Wayte, American gold medalist at 1984 Los Angeles Olympics, and silver medalist and bronze medalist at 1988 Seoul Olympics
- Emma Weyant, American silver medalist at 2020 Tokyo Olympics, and bronze medalist at 2024 Paris Olympics
- Ashley Whitney, American team member at 1996 Atlanta Olympics
- Paige Zemina, American bronze medalist at 1988 Seoul Olympics
- David Zubero, Spanish team member at 1976 Montreal Olympics, bronze medalist at 1980 Moscow Olympics, team member at 1984 Los Angeles Olympics
- Martin Zubero, Spanish team member at 1988 Seoul Olympics, gold medalist at 1992 Barcelona Olympics, team member at 1996 Atlanta Olympics

== Tennis ==
- Jill Craybas, American team member at 2008 Beijing Olympics
- Jill Hetherington, Canadian team member at 1984 Los Angeles Olympics, 1988 Seoul Olympics, and 1996 Atlanta Olympics
- Mark Merklein, Bahamian team member at 2000 Sydney Olympics and 2004 Athens Olympics
- Lisa Raymond, American team member at 2004 Athens Olympics, bronze medalist at 2012 London Olympics

== Track and field ==
- John Amabile, Puerto Rican team member at 1992 Barcelona Olympics
- Aaron Armstrong, Trinidad and Tobago team member at 2008 Beijing Olympics
- Kim Barrett, Jamaican team member at 2004 Athens Olympics
- Liston Bochette, Puerto Rican team member at 1984 Los Angeles Olympics
- Mark Bradley, Canadian team member at 1984 Los Angeles Olympics
- Keith Brantly, American team member at 1996 Atlanta Olympics
- John Capel, American team member at 2000 Sydney Olympics and 2004 Athens Olympics
- Hazel Clark, American team member at 2000 Sydney Olympics and 2004 Athens Olympics
- Will Claye, American silver medalist and bronze medalist at 2012 London Olympics
- Kerron Clement, American gold medalist and silver medalist at 2008 Beijing Olympics
- Gerald Clervil, Haitian team member at 2000 Sydney Olympics
- Jeff Demps, American team member at 2012 London Olympics
- Mark Everett, American team member at 1988 Seoul Olympics, 1992 Barcelona Olympics, and 2000 Sydney Olympics
- Michelle Freeman, Jamaican team member at 1992 Barcelona Olympics, bronze medalist at 1996 Atlanta Olympics, team member at 2000 Sydney Olympics
- Erin Gilreath, American team member at 2004 Athens Olympics
- Kenneth Gray, Jamaican team member at 1984 Los Angeles Olympics
- Genevieve Gregson, Australian team member at 2012 London Olympics, 2016 Rio Olympics, and 2020 Tokyo Olympics
- Kristin Heaston, American team member at 2008 Beijing Olympics
- Grant Holloway, American silver medalist at 2020 Tokyo Olympics and gold medalist at 2024 Paris Olympics
- Anita Howard, American team member at 1992 Barcelona Olympics
- Moise Joseph, Haitian team member at 2008 Beijing Olympics
- Ron Jourdan, American team member at 1972 Munich Olympics
- Mariam Kevkhishvili, Georgian team member at 2004 Athens Olympics and 2008 Beijing Olympics
- Fletcher Lewis, Bahamian team member at 1976 Montreal Olympics
- Cory McGee, American team member at the 2020 Tokyo Olympics
- Tony McQuay, American silver medalist at 2012 London Olympics
- Dan Middleman, American team member at 1996 Atlanta Olympics
- Dennis Mitchell, American team member at 1988 Seoul Olympics, gold medalist and bronze medalist at 1992 Barcelona Olympics, silver medalist at 1996 Atlanta Olympics
- Jasmine Moore, American bronze medalist at 2024 Paris Olympics
- Tiandra Ponteen, Saint Kitts and Nevis team member at 2004 Athens Olympics
- Tom Pukstys, American team member at 1992 Barcelona Olympics and 1996 Atlanta Olympics
- Leroy Reid, Jamaican team member at 1984 Los Angeles Olympics
- Dionne Rose, Jamaican team member at 1992 Barcelona Olympics
- Candice Scott, Trinidad and Tobago team member at 2004 Athens Olympics
- Michael Sharpe, Bermuda team member at 1976 Montreal Olympics
- Frank Shorter, American gold medalist at 1972 Munich Olympics, and silver medalist at 1976 Montreal Olympics
- Calvin Smith Jr., American team member at 2008 Beijing Olympics
- Shelly Steely, American team member at 1992 Barcelona Olympics
- Christian Taylor, American gold medalist at 2012 London Olympics
- Derek Trafias, Polish team member at 2000 Sydney Olympics
- Horace Tuitt, Trinidad and Tobago team member at 1976 Montreal Olympics and 1996 Atlanta Olympics
- Bernard Williams, American gold medalist at 2000 Sydney Olympics, and silver medalist at 2004 Athens Olympics
- Novlene Williams, Jamaican bronze medalist at 2004 Athens Olympics, bronze medalist at 2008 Beijing Olympics, and bronze medalist at 2012 London Olympics
- Henry Kupczyk, Canadian team member at 1992 Barcelona Olympics and 2016 Rio Olympics Coach Dominica

== Volleyball ==
- Kelly Murphy, American bronze medalist at 2016 Rio Olympics

== Coaches ==
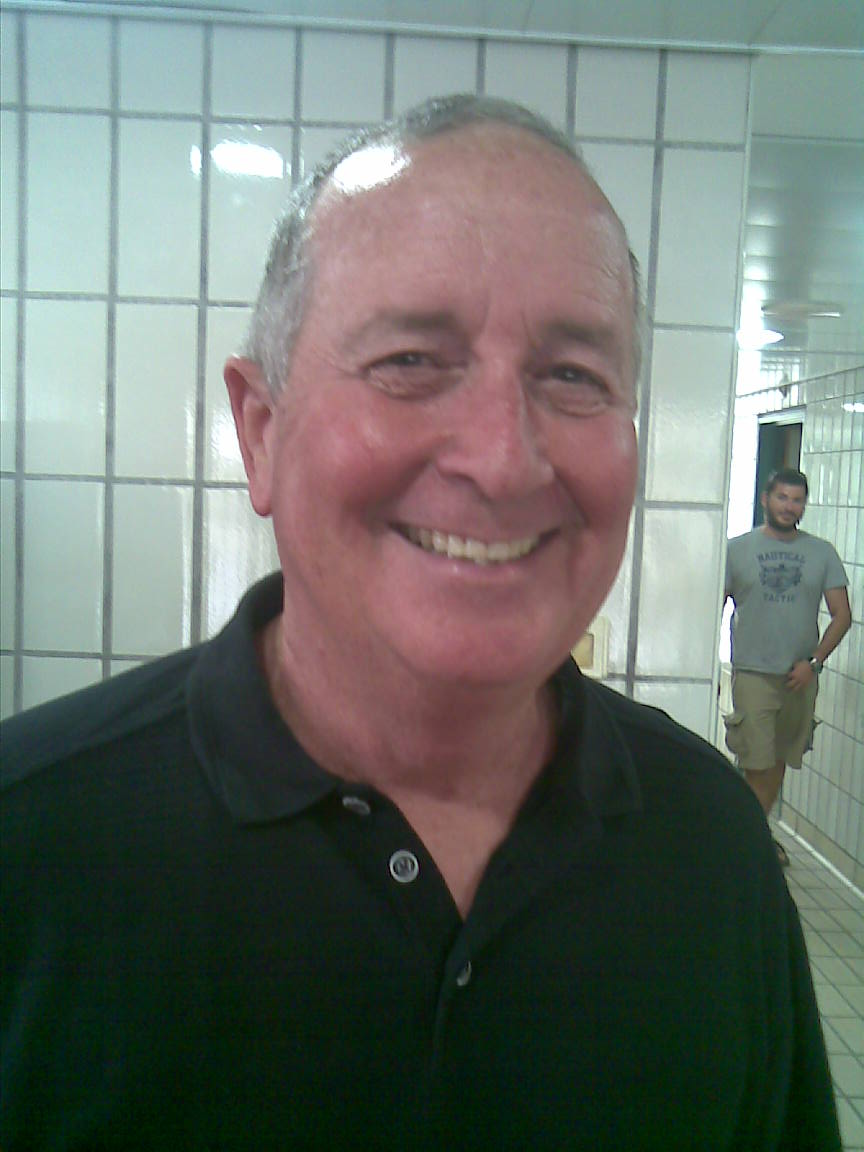
Eddie Reese

=== Swimming and diving ===
- Ron Ballatore, assistant coach for Peru at 1968 Mexico City Olympics, assistant coach for Ecuador at 1972 Munich Olympics, assistant coach for Israel at 1976 Montreal Olympics, assistant coach for United States at 1984 Los Angeles Olympics and 1988 Seoul Olympics
- Rich DeSelm, assistant team manager for United States at 2000 Sydney Olympics
- Mitch Ivey, American silver medalist at 1968 Mexico City Olympics, bronze medalist at 1972 Munich Olympics, assistant coach for United States at 1988 Seoul Olympics
- Chris Martin, assistant coach for United States at 1992 Barcelona Olympics
- Anthony Nesty, Surinamese gold medalist at 1988 Seoul Olympics, head coach for Suriname at 2004 Athens Olympics
- Eddie Reese, assistant coach for United States at 1988 Seoul Olympics, head coach for United States at 1992 Barcelona Olympics and 2008 Beijing Olympics
- Randy Reese, assistant coach for United States at 1980 Moscow Olympics, 1984 Los Angeles Olympics and 1988 Seoul Olympics
- Gregg Troy, assistant coach for Guam at 1988 Seoul Olympics, assistant coach for Thailand at 1992 Barcelona Olympics, assistant coach for United States at 1996 Atlanta Olympics and 2008 Beijing Olympics; head coach for United States men's team at 2012 London Olympics
- Martyn Wilby, head coach for Barbados 2000 Sydney Olympics

=== Track and field ===
- Jimmy Carnes, assistant coach for United States at 1976 Montreal Olympics, head coach for United States at 1980 Moscow Olympics
- Doug Brown, assistant coach for United States at 1996 Atlanta Olympics
- Mike Holloway, assistant coach for the United States at 2012 London Olympics
- Larry Judge, assistant coach for Trinidad & Tobago at 2004 Athens Olympics
- Henry Kupczyk, assistant and head jumping coach at 2016 Rio Olympics for Dominica

== See also ==
- Florida Gators
- List of Florida Gators baseball players in Major League Baseball
- List of Florida Gators in the NFL draft
- List of Florida Gators in the NBA
- List of Florida Gators men's golfers on the PGA Tour
- List of Florida Gators in the WNBA
- List of Florida Gators women's golfers on the LPGA Tour
- List of Florida Gators tennis players
- List of University of Florida alumni
- List of University of Florida Athletic Hall of Fame members
