= Craig Beardsley =

American swimmer (born 1960)

Personal information
- Full name: Craig Russell Beardsley
- National team: United States
- Born: 1960 (age 65–66) New York, New York, U.S.

Sport
- Sport: Swimming
- Strokes: Butterfly
- College team: University of Florida
Medal record
Men's swimming
Representing United States
World Championships (LC)
Bronze medal – third place	1982 Guayaguil	200 m butterfly
Pan American Games
Gold medal – first place	1979 San Juan	200 m butterfly
Gold medal – first place	1983 Caracas	200 m butterfly

Craig Russell Beardsley (born 1960) is an American former competition swimmer who was a world record-holder in the 200-meter butterfly for three years in the early 1980s. Although he qualified as a member of the 1980 U.S. Olympic Team, Beardsley could not compete in the Olympics because of the U.S. boycott of the Moscow Summer Olympic Games.

== Early years ==
Craig Beardsley was born in New York City in 1960, the son of an American father, Russell Beardsley, and a Chinese American immigrant mother, Jeanne Loh. He attended the United Nations International School in the city, where he was a stand-out cello player, and graduated from Northern Valley Regional High School at Old Tappan after his family moved to Harrington Park, New Jersey. Prior to attending college, Beardsley never had an opportunity to swim for a school team because none of his schools sponsored an organized swim team.

== Swimming career ==
At that time, I don't want to say that I supported the boycott, but I wasn't against it, either. I tried to think there was some good in it. We were doing the right thing. I supported everything at that time . . . [however], I began to realize that it was just another political movement. I became strongly opinionated about trying to separate sports and politics. It will never happen again. Sports, like music, is one of those great things that bind people together.

— Craig Beardsley, discussing the U.S. Boycott of the
1980 Moscow Olympics in 2009.

Beardsley won the gold medal in his signature event, the 200-meter butterfly, at the 1979 Pan American Games in San Juan, Puerto Rico. After high school, he received an athletic scholarship to attend the University of Florida in Gainesville, Florida, where he swam for coach Randy Reese's Florida Gators swimming and diving team in National Collegiate Athletic Association (NCAA) competition from 1979 to 1982. Beardsley qualified for the star-crossed U.S. Olympic team in 1980, but could not participate when, at the behest of U.S. President Jimmy Carter, the U.S. Olympic Committee voted to boycott the 1980 Summer Olympics in Moscow, Russia after the Soviet Union invaded Afghanistan in late 1979. Like many of the best American athletes of 1980, he was denied the opportunity to participate in the largest stage in international sports. At the 1980 U.S. Olympic Trials held the month before the Olympics, Beardsley set a new world record of 1:58.21 in the 200-meter butterfly—a time that was over a second faster than Soviet swimmer Sergey Fesenko's gold medal time in the 1980 Olympic finals.

After the United States-led a boycott of the Moscow Olympics, Beardsley continued to train and participate in competitive swimming. He held both the American and world records for the 200-meter butterfly from 1980 to 1983. Swimming World Magazine named him its American Male Swimmer of the Year in 1981. Beardsley was a two-time NCAA champion in the 200-meter butterfly and received eight All-American honors while swimming for the Gators. In 1983, he again won the gold medal in the 200-meter butterfly at the Pan American Games in Caracas, Venezuela.

Beardsley failed to qualify for the U.S Olympic team in 1984, by placing third by 0.36 of a second in the U.S. Olympic Trials, and he retired from competitive swimming afterward. Taking advantage of the hard feelings created by the American-led boycott of the 1980 Moscow Olympics, the Soviet Union and other Eastern Bloc countries had pushed for and received Olympic rules changes limiting each country to only two participants in each swimming event. The United States, as the dominant swimming power, was hurt the most.

== Life after competition swimming ==
Beardsley is a veteran celebrity swimmer for Swim Across America (SAA), a charitable organization that raises funds for cancer research. He has been an active participant in SAA events since 1987.

He graduated from the University of Florida with a bachelor's degree in management in 1983, and was later inducted into the University of Florida Athletic Hall of Fame as a "Gator Great." Beardsley became a Wall Street trader, working for Prudential Securities in New York City. In 1992, he married Ann-Elizabeth McKay Hensel, a former member of the U.S. national figure skating team. He has two children, Carter and Caroline, and lives in Chatham, New Jersey.

== See also ==
- List of University of Florida alumni
- List of University of Florida Athletic Hall of Fame members
- List of University of Florida Olympians
- List of World Aquatics Championships medalists in swimming (men)
- World record progression 200 metres butterfly

== Bibliography ==
- Caraccioli, Jerry, & Tom Caraccioli, Boycott: Stolen Dreams of the 1980 Moscow Olympic Games, New Chapter Press, Washington, D.C. (2009). ISBN 978-0-942257-54-0.

Records
Preceded by Mike Bruner	Men's 200-meter butterfly world record-holder (long course); July 30, 1980 – August 26, 1983	Succeeded by Michael Gross
