= Richard Saeger =

American swimmer (born 1964)

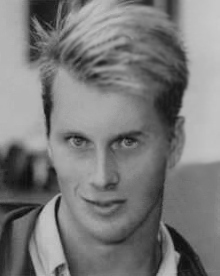
- Saeger in 1984

Personal information
- Full name: Richard Edwin Saeger
- Nickname: "Rich"
- National team: United States
- Born: March 4, 1964 (age 62) Rochester, New York, U.S.
- Height: 6 ft 1 in (1.85 m)
- Weight: 185 lb (84 kg)

Sport
- Sport: Swimming
- Strokes: Backstroke, Freestyle
- College team: Southern Methodist University
- Coach: John Trembley (Mercersburg); George McMillion (SMU)
Medal record
Representing the United States
Olympic Games
Gold medal – first place	1984 Los Angeles	4×200 m freestyle
World Championships
Gold medal – first place	1982 Guayaquil	4x200 m freestyle
Pan American Games
Gold medal – first place	1983 Caracas	4×200 m freestyle
Universiade
Silver medal – second place	1983 Edmonton	4×200 m freestyle

Richard Edwin "Rich" Saeger (born March 4, 1964), is an American former competition swimmer for Southern Methodist University, a 1984 Los Angeles Olympic gold medalist, and a former world record-holder in the 4x200-meter freestyle relay.

== Early life ==
Born in Rochester, New York on March 4, 1964, Saeger swam for nearby Penfield High School in Penfield, New York where he was an All American. In January 1982, he held New York State High School swimming records of 1:39.89 in the 200 freestyle, 45.66 in the 100 freestyle and 52.91 in the 100 backstroke.

He later transferred as a Senior to Mercersburg Academy in Pennsylvania where he was coached by John Trembley, a future coach of Southwest Conference Champions University of Tennessee. While at Mercersburg, Saeger set the national record for independent schools for the short-course 100-meter butterfly with a time of 56.60. During his Senior year at Mercersburg in March 1982, Saeger set a National high school record in the 100-yard freestyle of :49.25. While a Senior at Mercersburg in February, 1982 he set three prep school records at the Interscholastic Swimming Championships in the 200-yard freestyle of 1:37.257, and in the 100-yard butterfly of :49.359, also helping Mercersburg to set a new school record in the 400-yard freestyle relay of 3:03.05.

== Southern Methodist U. ==
In college, he swam for Southern Methodist University (SMU) where he was mentored by Hall of Fame Coach George McMillion and graduated in 1986. A strong program recognized nationally, the 1983 team finished fifth at the NCAA championships, and the following year were rated 11th nationally in polling before the start of the 1984 season. In his Senior year at SMU in February 1986, he held Southwest Conference times of 1:40.18 in the 200 freestyle, 53.05 in the 100 backstroke, 1:52.43 in the 200 backstroke, and 1:56.06 in the 200 Individual Medley.

== International competition ==
Swimming at the U.S. World Championship trials on July 19, 1982, in Mission Viejo, California, where he trained that summer, Saeger qualified for the World Aquatics Championships in the 200-meter freestyle with a 1:50.95, the best time of his career. At a preliminary heat for the 200-meter freestyle at the Guayaquil World Championships, Saeger and the American team lost a protest claiming there was a malfunction in the starting horn. Overcoming his problems with the 200-meter individual freestyle, Saeger, competing as the leadoff swimmer, won the gold medal in the 4x200-meter freestyle relay final on August 2, 1982 in Guayaquil's World Aquatics Championships. He swam with the American team of Jeff Float, Kyle Miller, and Olympic Champion Rowdy Gaines, for a combined time of 7:21.09, very close to the former world record.

He again won gold in the 4x200 at the 1983 Pan American Games in Caracas, and added a silver in the 4x200 at the 1983 Universiade in Edmonton.

== 1984 L. A. Olympic gold ==
1984 U.S. Olympic Coach Don Gambril

At the 1984 Summer Olympics in Los Angeles, Saeger earned a gold medal by swimming for the winning U.S. team in the preliminary heats of the men's 4×200-meter freestyle relay. The American team of Geoff Gaberino, David Larson, Bruce Hayes and Saeger set a new world record in the Olympic preliminary heat (7:18.87), only for the Americans to break the record again in the event final later on the same day with an improved world record of 7:15.69.

In an extremely close finish in the final heat, The West German team swam a combined time of 7:15.73, touching only .04 seconds after the American team. The team from Great Britain finished fourth for the bronze. In the close 4x200 meter final, West German anchor Michael Grob caught up to the American anchor Bruce Hayes in the early part of the final leg closing a margin of only 1.56 seconds. America's anchor, Bruce Hayes swam very close to the West German for most of the remaining race with the audience not knowing which team had touched first at the finish, until the scoreboard revealed the American team's, slight .04 second advantage. At the time, the race was considered one of the closest relay finishes in Olympic history. The American Olympic team head coach Don Gambril noted later that the final relay swimmer Grob wore himself out trying to catch Hayes, the final American swimmer, in the first part of their final 200-meter leg.

Former SMU swimmers and teammates Steve Lundquist, and Ricardo Prado, also medaled at the 1984 Olympic games.

Saeger later participated in United States Masters Swimming, competing in meets from 2001-2015 from ages 37-51. He specialized in back, fly, and freestyle events, from 50 to 200 meters. He lived in Irvine, California, and swam for several master's clubs in the Southern Pacific region, including the outstanding Mission Viejo Masters Club which was nearby. In 2005-6, he helped set 8 U.S. Masters records in freestyle and medley relay events.

== See also ==
- List of Olympic medalists in swimming (men)
- List of Southern Methodist University people
- List of World Aquatics Championships medalists in swimming (men)
- World record progression 4 × 200 metres freestyle relay

== Bibliography ==
- De George, Matthew, Pooling Talent: Swimming's Greatest Teams, Rowman & Littlefield, Lanham, Maryland (2014). ISBN 978-1-4422-3701-8.
