= Andrew Astbury =

English swimmer (born 1960)

Personal information
- National team: Great Britain
- Born: 29 November 1960 (age 65) Leeds, England
- Height: 1.85 m (6 ft 1 in)
- Weight: 81 kg (179 lb; 12.8 st)

Sport
- Sport: Swimming
- Strokes: Freestyle
- Club: City of Leeds
Medal record
Men's swimming
Representing Great Britain
Olympic Games
Bronze medal – third place	1984 Los Angeles	4x200 m freestyle
Representing England
Commonwealth Games
Gold medal – first place	1982 Brisbane	200 m freestyle
Gold medal – first place	1982 Brisbane	400 m freestyle
Silver medal – second place	1982 Brisbane	4×200 m freestyle
Bronze medal – third place	1978 Edmonton	1500 m freestyle
Bronze medal – third place	1982 Brisbane	1500 m freestyle

Andrew Astbury (born 29 November 1960) is an English former competitive swimmer who represented Great Britain at the Olympics and England in the Commonwealth Games in the late 1970s and early 1980s.

== Swimming career ==
In his international swimming debut as an 18-year-old, Astbury represented England at the 1978 Commonwealth Games in Edmonton, Alberta, Canada, where he received a bronze medal for this third-place finish in the men's 1500-metre freestyle.

In the first of two consecutive Summer Olympics in which he appeared, Astbury swam for Great Britain at the 1980 Summer Olympics in Moscow. He was a member of the sixth-place British team in the men's 4x200-metre freestyle relay. In individual competition, he also competed in the preliminary heats of the 400 and 1500-metre freestyle events.

Competing for England at the 1982 Commonwealth Games in Brisbane, Australia, Astbury won gold medals in the 200-metre and 400-metre freestyle races in Commonwealth record times. He also won a silver medal as a member of the English men's team in the 4x200-metre freestyle relay, and a bronze medal in the 1500-metre freestyle.

At the 1984 Summer Olympics in Los Angeles, California, he claimed the bronze medal in the 4×200-metre freestyle relay, together with British teammates Neil Cochran, Paul Easter and Paul Howe, finishing behind the Americans and West Germans. He also advanced to the B Final of the 400-metre freestyle, finishing sixth in the consolation final (14th overall), and competed in the preliminary heats of the 1500-metre freestyle.

He won the 1981 ASA National Championship 200 metres freestyle title and the 400 metres freestyle in 1980, 1981 and 1982. He also won the ASA British National 1500 metres freestyle title four times from 1980 to 1983.

== See also ==
- List of Commonwealth Games medallists in swimming (men)
- List of Olympic medalists in swimming (men)
