= Rafael Vidal =

Venezuelan swimmer (1964–2005)

Personal information
- Full name: Rafael Antonio Vidal Castro
- National team: Venezuela
- Born: January 6, 1964 Caracas, Venezuela
- Died: February 12, 2005 (aged 41) Caracas, Venezuela
- Height: 1.80 m (5 ft 11 in)
- Weight: 72 kg (159 lb)

Sport
- Sport: Swimming
- Strokes: Butterfly, freestyle
- College team: University of Florida
Medal record
Men's swimming
Representing Venezuela
Olympic Games
Bronze medal – third place	1984 Los Angeles	200 m butterfly
Pan American Games
Bronze medal – third place	1983 Caracas	100 m butterfly
Bronze medal – third place	1983 Caracas	200 m butterfly
Bronze medal – third place	1983 Caracas	4×100 m freestyle
Bronze medal – third place	1983 Caracas	4×200 m freestyle
Bronze medal – third place	1983 Caracas	4×100 m medley

Rafael Antonio Vidal Castro (January 6, 1964 – February 12, 2005) was a Venezuelan competition swimmer, Olympic medalist and sports commentator.

== Life ==
Vidal was born in Caracas, Venezuela in 1964. At age 20, he became the first Venezuelan swimmer to win an Olympic medal in the 200-meter butterfly competition at the 1984 Summer Olympics in Los Angeles, California. Although he was one of the smallest men in the pool at 5-foot-11, Vidal was well ahead of West Germany's 6-foot-7 Michael Gross at the finish. However, one of Gross' elongated arms managed to touch the poolside first, robbing Vidal of silver. That heroic bronze-medal finish made him a national celebrity, with his image splashed on magazine and newspaper covers throughout Venezuela. His mark ranks him as the eighth of the top ten swimmers in the 200-meter butterfly of all time.

A year later, Vidal left Venezuela to pursue a career in administration and earned his bachelor's degree in computer and information sciences from the University of Florida in Gainesville, Florida, where he swam for the Florida Gators swimming and diving team in National Collegiate Athletic Association (NCAA) competition under coach Randy Reese from 1981 to 1985. Vidal was a member of the Gators' NCAA national championship teams in 1983 and 1984, and received six All-American honors.

After returning to Venezuela, Vidal was employed by a local television channel as a sports commentator and became a well-known television personality. In 1998, he founded Platinum with Cheche Vidal, a pioneer in the application of marketing in Venezuela.

Early on the morning of February 12, 2005, Vidal was killed in a traffic accident when another driver crashed his speeding Hummer into Vidal's car. The second driver was participating in an illegal street race. Vidal was 41 years old.

A "Million Meter Swim" (Un Millón de metros por Rafael Vidal) was held on February 12, 2006, at which more than fourteen million meters were swum by swimmers from Venezuela and around the globe. The tribute has been held every year since then.

== Personal life ==
On April 10 2017 his mother Flor Marina Castro de Vidal was found dead in her home by her daughter, apparently murdered by house thieves when she resisted robbery.

== See also ==
- Florida Gators
- List of Olympic medalists in swimming (men)
- List of University of Florida alumni
- List of University of Florida Olympians
- Polideportivo Rafael Vidal
