= Paul Easter =

British swimmer (born 1963)

Personal information
- Full name: Paul Robert Easter
- National team: Great Britain
- Born: 14 May 1963 (age 63) Norwich, England
- Height: 1.83 m (6 ft 0 in)
- Weight: 77 kg (170 lb; 12.1 st)

Sport
- Sport: Swimming
- Strokes: Freestyle, butterfly
- Club: Warrender Baths Club, City of Swansea
- College team: Arizona State University
Medal record
Men's swimming
Representing Great Britain
Olympic Games
Bronze medal – third place	1984 Los Angeles	4x200 m freestyle
Representing Scotland
British Commonwealth Games
Bronze medal – third place	1982 Brisbane	4x200 m freestyle
Bronze medal – third place	1982 Brisbane	4x100 m medley

Paul Robert Easter (born 14 May 1963) is a former competitive swimmer who represented Great Britain in the Olympics, and competed for Scotland in the Commonwealth Games.

== Swimming career ==
He was freestyle swimmer, and swam for Warrender Baths Club in Edinburgh. He also swam for City of Swansea swimming club and Arizona State University while studying there. He competed at the Summer Olympics for Great Britain at the 1984 (Los Angeles, California). In 1984 he claimed the bronze medal in the 4×200 m freestyle relay, alongside Neil Cochran, Andrew Astbury, and Paul Howe.

Easter won six Scottish swimming championships and broke eight Scottish swimming records in 1982. He swam for Great Britain in the European Cup and competed for Scotland in the 1982 Commonwealth Games in Brisbane], Australia where he won a bronze medal in the 4x200 metre freestyle relay with Neil Cochran, Douglas Campbell and Graeme Wilson, and a bronze medal in the 4x100 metre medley relay with Doug Campbell, Iain Cambell and William McGoldrick. He represented Great Britain at the 1982 World Aquatics Championships in Guayaquil, Ecuador. In 1983 he broke eight Scottish records, was named the outstanding swimmer at the British short-course championships in Cardiff and represented Great Britain in an international swimming matches against Holland, Russia and Canada. In 1984 he broke the Scottish 100 and 200 m freestyle and 200 m butterfly records before winning his bronze medal at the Olympics. In 1985 he broke the Scottish 200 m freestyle record again and won the 400 m freestyle and 200 m butterfly championships. He was selected to swim for Scotland at the 1986 Commonwealth Games but had to withdraw because of illness.

He won the 1985 British Championship in the 400 metres freestyle and the 100 metres butterfly.

== Personal life ==
In 2012 Easter was a police officer at the Nottinghamshire Police. He was the dive team leader in the underwater-search unit. In 2014 Easter occasionally coached swimming at Nottingham Leander Swimming Club.

Easter was inducted into the Scottish Swimming Hall of Fame in 2018.

== See also ==
- List of Commonwealth Games medallists in swimming (men)
- List of Olympic medalists in swimming (men)
