= Carlos Scanavino =

Uruguayan swimmer

Personal information
- Born: March 11, 1964 (age 62) Paysandú, Uruguay
Medal record
Men's swimming
Representing Uruguay
Pan American Games
Silver medal – second place	1987 Indianapolis	200m Freestyle
Bronze medal – third place	1983 Caracas	1500m Freestyle

Carlos A. Scanavino Villavicenio (born March 11, 1964) is a former international freestyle swimmer from Uruguay.

He participated in two consecutive Summer Olympics for his native country, starting in 1984. His best result was the 12th place in the Men's 400m Freestyle Relay in Seoul, South Korea.
