= Swim Across America =

American nonprofit organization

Swim Across America, Inc.
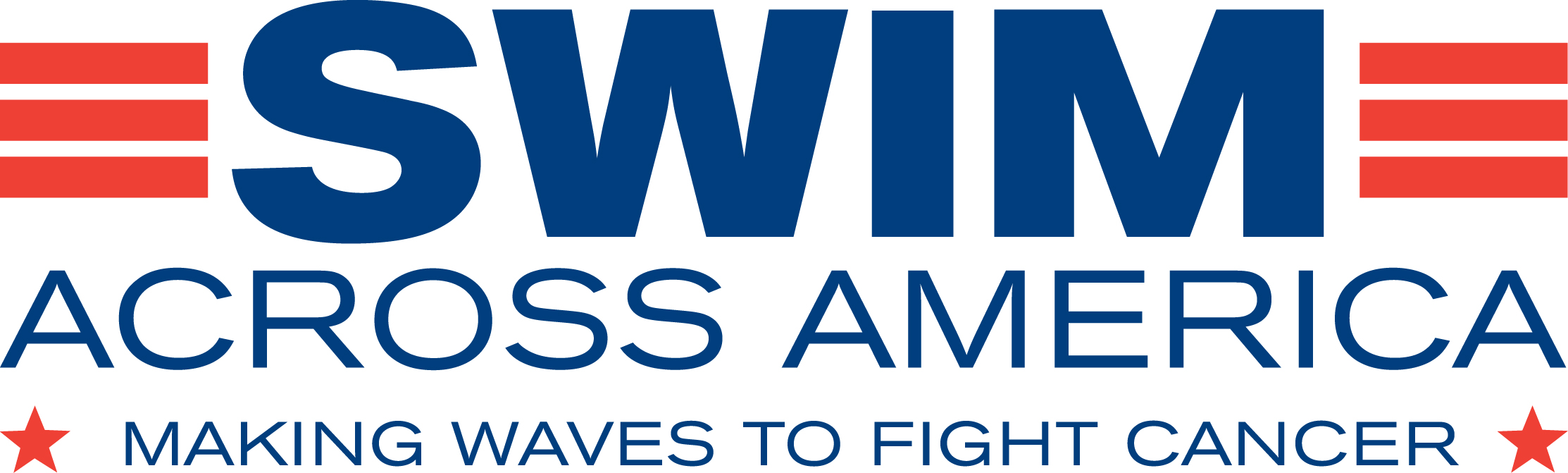
- Founded: June 1987
- Type: 501(c)(3) non-profit
- Tax ID no.: 22-3248256
- Key people: Rob Butcher, CEO
- Website: swimacrossamerica.org

Swim Across America Inc., (SAA) is a nonprofit dedicated to raising money and awareness for cancer research, prevention, and treatment. It does so by hosting charity swims and donating the proceeds to a hospital. Since its founding, SAA has granted over $100 million to fund cancer research and clinical trials. More than 100,000 donations a year are made to support participants in Swim Across America charity swims to meet their fundraising goals. The proceeds from SAA charity swims are granted to fund cancer research at world-renowned hospitals such as Memorial Sloan-Kettering Cancer Center and Johns Hopkins.

In 2020, Swim Across America will award a record $6 million in cancer research grants that will fund more than 50 projects and programs.

== Origins and mission ==
=== Founders ===
In the summer of 1984, childhood friends and recent college graduates Jeff Keith, Matt Vossler, and Hugh Curran ran across the USA beginning in Boston and finishing spring of 1985 in Los Angeles. Keith, a survivor of cancer, had lost part of his right leg to cancer and their run raised over $1 million for the American Cancer Society. Swim Across America is the inspired sequel to the triumphant Run Across America completed by the two founders of SAA, Jeff Keith and Matt Vossler in 1985. The eight-month journey spanned the country from Boston to Los Angeles and raised over $1 million for cancer research. Jeff Keith, one of the determined runners, a 22-year-old from Fairfield, CT, had lost his right leg to cancer a decade before. Following college graduation, these two childhood buddies embarked on their mission, making history in the process. Together, they instilled hope in all who fight this disease and heightened consciousness about overcoming this frightening diagnosis.

=== Mission ===
Swim Across America's mission is to raise money and awareness for cancer research, prevention, and treatment through swimming-related events. The Swim Across America tagline is "Making Waves to Fight Cancer."

It is important donors know that the grant agreement requires 100% of SAA grants be applied to approved projects and not other things such as overhead and buildings.

=== Impact ===
“SAA funding has played a major role in clinically developing the four FDA approved immunotherapy medicines ipilimumab (YERVOY), nivolumab (OPDIVO), pembrolizumab (KEYTRUDA) and atezolizumab (TECENTRIQ).” - Dr. Jedd Wolchok, Chief Oncology, Memorial Sloan Kettering.

== Events ==
Swim Across America primarily hosts two types of charity swims: open water and pool swims.

Swim Across America will feature 21 open water charity swims in 2020 in the following markets: San Francisco, Larchmont (NY), Glen Cove (NY), Fairfield County (CT), Seattle, Chicago, Baltimore, Rhode Island, Dallas, Tampa, Boston, Nantucket, Atlanta, Charlotte, St. Louis, Denver, Charleston-Kiawah (SC), Houston, Los Angeles and Detroit. Proceeds from open water swims are then donated to a local hospital. Typically, the open water swim distances are 1/2 mile up to 3 miles, with participants selecting a distance based on their ability and comfort level. Participants pay a tax-deductible registration fee that can range from $50 to $100 and then agree to meet a fundraising minimum by soliciting donations from their family, friends, and employers.

Swim Across America - Long Island Sound has historically raised the largest amount each year, including over $1.2 million in 2019.Swim Across America Long Island Sound Sets New Record Swim Across America acknowledges the history of its greatest teams and partners who have supported with a Champions Wall.

Pool swims are charity swims hosted by age group, high school, college, masters, summer league, and facilities that want to dedicate a day or practice to SAA. Pool swims do not have fundraising requirements the way open water charity swims do and typically are not connected to a local hospital. The proceeds from pool swims are "pooled" together and granted by SAA's beneficiary committee.

=== Sponsors and partnerships ===
A number of sponsors play a substantial role in the execution of SAA events. Current corporate partners of Swim Across America include Merck, KPMG, SwimOutlet.com, GlaxoSmithKline, National Coalition of 7-Eleven Franchisee Owners Association, Captivate, Clear Channel Outdoor, Orca and Swimmingly.

=== Olympians ===
Over 100 Olympians have attended Swim Across America swims and special events generating awareness and raising donations for our beneficiaries. SAA has attracted the involvement of many Olympic swimmers including Michael Phelps, Nathan Adrian, Missy Franklin, Elizabeth Beisel, Jenny Thompson, Ryan Lochte, Craig Beardsley, Rowdy Gaines, Steve Lundquist, Kristy Kowal, Heather Petri, Jill Sterkel, Summer Sanders, Christine Magnuson, Cullen Jones, Janel Jorgensen McArdle, Brooke Bennett, Theresa Andrews, Jeff Rouse, Ryan Berube and countless others.

== Beneficiaries ==
Swim Across America uses donations to support patients in all stages of cancer, from early research to diagnosis to treatments to postcancer support. Beneficiaries include many of the most prestigious cancer research institutes in the United States, such as Memorial Sloan Kettering Cancer Center (New York), Johns Hopkins Medicine Sidney Kimmel Comprehensive Cancer Center (Baltimore), Vanderbilt-Ingram Cancer Center Vanderbilt Ingram Cancer Center (Nashville), Rush University Medical Center (Chicago), Alliance for Cancer Gene Therapy (Connecticut), Columbia University Medical Center, Dana-Farber Cancer Institute, Mass General Hospital for Children Cancer Center, Cancer Support Team (NY), Cold Spring Harbor Laboratory (NY), Feinstein Institute of North Shore (NY), Nantucket Cottage Hospital, Palliative and Supportive Care of Nantucket, UCSF Benioff Children's Hospitals (San Francisco and Oakland), Seattle Cancer Care Alliance, Women & Infants Hospital (RI), Baylor Scott & White Health (Dallas), Moffitt Cancer Center (FL), Johns Hopkins All Children’s Hospital (FL), Children’s Healthcare of Atlanta, Levine Cancer Institute (Atrium Health) (Charlotte), MD Anderson Cancer Center (Houston), Siteman Cancer Center (St. Louis), Hollings Cancer Center (Medical University of South Carolina), Children’s Hospital Colorado, Rogel Cancer Center (University of Michigan Medicine) and UCLA Jonsson Comprehensive Cancer Center.

Fundraising from SAA events is consistently donated to local beneficiaries, allowing participants to have a direct impact on their communities.

In at least nine cancer research and care institutes, including Memorial Sloan-Kettering Cancer Center and the Sidney-Kimmel Comprehensive Cancer Center at Johns Hopkins Hospital, Swim Across America's donations have led to the establishment and operation of new research laboratories named for the organization.
