= Marco Dell'Uomo =

Italian swimmer

Personal information
- Born: November 14, 1961 (age 64) Rome, Italy

Sport
- Sport: Swimming
Medal record
Representing Italy
Mediterranean Games
| Gold medal – first place | 1983 Casablanca | 4x200m freestyle relay |
| Silver medal – second place | 1983 Casablanca | 400m freestyle |

Marco Dell'Uomo (born 14 November 1961) is an Italian former freestyle swimmer who competed in the 1984 Summer Olympics.
