= Peter Dale (swimmer) =

Australian swimmer (born 1963)

Personal information
- Born: 30 October 1963 (age 62)

Sport
- Sport: Swimming
- Strokes: Freestyle
Medal record
Commonwealth Games
Gold medal – first place	1986 Edinburgh	4 x 200 m freestyle
Silver medal – second place	1986 Edinburgh	200 m freestyle

Peter Richard Dale (born 30 October 1963) is an Australian swimmer. He competed in two events at the 1984 Summer Olympics.

He attended Padua College in Brisbane.
