= Bruce Hayes (swimmer) =

American swimmer (born 1963)

Personal information
- Full name: Lawrence Bruce Hayes
- National team: United States
- Born: March 8, 1963 (age 63) Sarasota, Florida, U.S.
- Height: 6 ft 0 in (1.83 m)
- Weight: 161 lb (73 kg)

Sport
- Sport: Swimming
- Strokes: Freestyle
- Club: Alamo Area Aquatic Association
- College team: University of California, Los Angeles
Medal record
Men's swimming
Representing the United States
Olympic Games
Gold medal – first place	1984 Los Angeles	4x200 m freestyle
Pan American Games
Gold medal – first place	1983 Caracas	200 m freestyle
Gold medal – first place	1983 Caracas	400 m freestyle
Gold medal – first place	1983 Caracas	4x200 m freestyle
Summer Universiade
Gold medal – first place	1983 Edmonton	200 m freestyle
Silver medal – second place	1983 Edmonton	400 m freestyle
Silver medal – second place	1983 Edmonton	400 m medley
Silver medal – second place	1983 Edmonton	4x100 m freestyle
Silver medal – second place	1983 Edmonton	4x200 m freestyle
Bronze medal – third place	1983 Edmonton	1500 m freestyle

Lawrence Bruce Hayes (born March 8, 1963) is an American former competition swimmer best known for anchoring the U.S. men's 4×200-meter freestyle relay team that won the gold medal at the 1984 Summer Olympics in Los Angeles.

Born in Sarasota, Florida, and raised in San Antonio, Hayes was an outstanding Texas age-group swimmer, setting numerous TAGS records. He capped a successful high school career at Highland Park High School under Coach Mike Sorrells, winning a state championship in the 200-yard individual medley and 100-yard backstroke. Hayes' success as a Texas age group and high school swimmer earned him a full scholarship to University of California, Los Angeles (UCLA). Swimming for coach Ron Ballatore's UCLA Bruins swimming and diving team, he was the highest scoring freshman at the 1982 NCAA Men's Swimming and Diving Championships, helping the Bruins win the national team championship.

On April 13, 2012, Hayes was inducted into the Texas Swimming and Diving Hall of Fame.

== International career ==
Hayes represented the United States in several international swimming meets. He qualified in the 400-meter and 1500-meter freestyle events for the U.S. national team that won a 1981 dual meet against the Soviet Union in Kiev, Ukraine. At the 1982 FINA World Championships in Guayaquil, Ecuador, he was a finalist in the 400-meter individual medley and also contested the 400-meter and 1,500-meter freestyle events.

Hayes' first national and international titles came in 1983. He won seven medals at the 1983 World University Games in Edmonton – the most by any American swimmer – and his win in the 200-meter freestyle was the only U.S. gold. His UCLA coach Ron Ballatore was quoted in Sports Illustrated about Hayes' Edmonton performance, saying, "Hayes can come home better than anyone I've ever seen." A few weeks later he won the 200-meter freestyle at the 1983 summer United States Swimming Championships.

At the 1983 Pan American Games in Caracas, Venezuela, Hayes won three gold medals in the 200-meter and 400-meter freestyle races and in the 4×200-meter freestyle relay. He also collected three gold medals at the 1983 Descente International Invitational Swim Meet in Tokyo in the same three events.

Hayes won the 400-meter freestyle race at the 1984 winter United States Swimming Championships for his second national title. He finished third in the 200-meter freestyle at the 1984 United States Olympic Swimming Trials, qualifying him for a place on the U.S. team in the men's 4×200-meter freestyle relay in Los Angeles.

In an event unaffected by the Soviet-led boycott, the Americans would battle a talented West German relay team including the 200-meter freestyle world record holder, Michael Gross. The U.S. coaches decided to capitalize on Hayes' finishing ability by having him take the final leg behind teammates Mike Heath, David Larson and Jeff Float. However Hayes knew that because his best 200m freestyle time was three seconds slower than Gross', he would need a three-second lead upon starting the relay to guarantee a win.

With the U.S. ahead by one-and-a-half seconds after the third leg, Gross pulled even with Hayes after the first turn and was slightly ahead after the third. Yet, despite Gross' swimming the fastest 200-meter relay split to date, Hayes' closing strength resulted in a best personal time by more than a second, including the fastest final fifty meters ever. Hayes out-touched Gross by four one-hundredths (0.04) of a second, with the U.S. setting a world record 7:15.69.

The Los Angeles media dubbed Hayes' team the "Grossbusters." Among their many media appearances was a Vanity Fair magazine cover with Raquel Welch. Capping the year, the U.S. men's 4×200-meter freestyle relay team won the 1984 Phillips Performance Award. Hayes appears in Bud Greenspan's documentary of the 1984 Los Angeles Olympic Games, 16 Days of Glory, in the segment about the race.

=== Changing course ===
Hayes captured one more national title before retiring when he won the 200-meter freestyle at the 1984 summer United States Swimming Championships, held after the Olympics. He subsequently earned a master's degree in journalism at Northwestern University in Chicago and then moved to New York City to begin a professional career in public relations. He joined Team New York Aquatics in 1990 and began competing again, this time in Masters swimming events. He became the first Olympic gold medalist to compete at the Gay Games when he swam at Gay Games III in Vancouver in August 1990. He came out publicly while competing and has gone on to organize Gay Games events. "When you're famous and you come out, all of a sudden, the gay community wants to embrace you. You become a role model, and I felt there was a lot I could do on behalf of the Games. The media would listen to me because I have the credibility of being an Olympic gold-medal winner, the kind of leeway to say the Gay Games are serious competition."

In 1992, Hayes became the first American Olympic gold medalist to declare his homosexuality publicly when he was profiled by Dick Schaap for ABC's World News Tonight regarding the challenges of being gay in the sports community. He became a spokesperson for the Gay Games IV in New York City in 1994.

At Gay Games IV, his swimming success continued – he set five 25-meter short course Masters world records in the 30–34 age group, including becoming the first Masters swimmer to break 4:00 in the 400-meter freestyle. He was included in Out magazine's 1994 list of the 100 most influential gays and lesbians in America.

Hayes worked for the Atlanta Committee for the Olympic Games as the Assistant Competition Manager for Swimming at the 1996 Summer Olympics in Atlanta. During his time in Atlanta, he co-founded the Atlanta Rainbow Trout Masters swimming team.

He resumed his public relations career at Edelman in New York following the Atlanta Olympics and later worked for two years in Edelman's Madrid office. In 2002, Hayes became a charter member of the Gay Games Ambassadors. He attended the Gay Games' 25th anniversary celebration in San Francisco in 2007 and presented the Federation of Gay Games' inaugural Media Award.

Hayes swam again at the 2010 Gay Games VIII in Cologne, Germany, winning a bronze in the 1,500-meter freestyle (age 45–49) behind Aaron Murphy (Great Britain) and Jonathan Haines (Australia).

== See also ==
- List of Olympic medalists in swimming (men)
- List of University of California, Los Angeles people
- World record progression 4 × 200 metres freestyle relay

== Bibliography ==
- De George, Matthew, Pooling Talent: Swimming's Greatest Teams, Rowman & Littlefield, Lanham, Maryland (2014). ISBN 978-1-4422-3701-8.
