= Juan Carlos Vallejo =

Spanish swimmer

Personal information
- Born: May 27, 1963 (age 63)

Sport
- Sport: Swimming

Juan Carlos Vallejo (born 27 May 1963) is a Spanish former swimmer who competed in the 1980 Summer Olympics and in the 1984 Summer Olympics.
