= Jean-Marie François =

Venezuelan swimmer (born 1963)

Jean-Marc François
Personal information
- Full name: Jean-Marc François Carezis
- Nationality: French/US/Venezuelan
- Born: 12 May 1963 (age 63) United States
- Height: 1.85 m (6 ft 1 in)
- Weight: 75 kg (165 lb)

Sport
- Sport: Swimming
- Strokes: Freestyle
Medal record
Men's swimming
Representing Venezuela
Pan American Games
Bronze medal – third place	1983 Caracas	4x100m freestyle
Bronze medal – third place	1983 Caracas	4x200m freestyle

Jean-Marie François (born 12 May 1963) is a Venezuelan former swimmer who competed in the 1980 Summer Olympics and in the 1984 Summer Olympics.
