= Jeff Float =

American swimmer (born 1960)

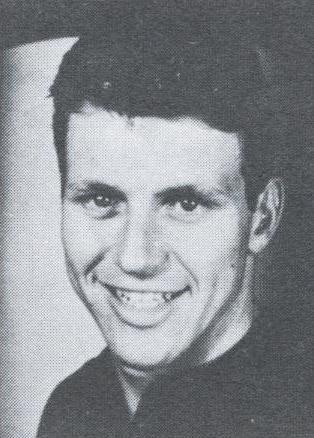
- Float circa 1984

Personal information
- Full name: Jeffrey James Float
- Nickname: "Jeff"
- National team: United States
- Born: April 10, 1960 (age 66) Buffalo, New York, U.S.
- Height: 6 ft 3 in (1.91 m)
- Weight: 187 lb (85 kg)

Sport
- Sport: Swimming
- Strokes: Individual Medley
- Club: Arden Hills Swim Club
- College team: University of Southern California
Medal record
Men's Swimming
Representing the United States
Olympic Games
| Gold medal – first place | 1984 Los Angeles | 4x200 m freestyle |
World Aquatics Championships
| Gold medal – first place | 1982 Guayaquil | 4x200 m freestyle |
| Silver medal – second place | 1978 Berlin | 400 m freestyle |

Jeffrey James Float is an American former competitive swimmer, world record holder, world champion and Olympic gold medalist. He qualified for the 1980 USA Olympic Swimming Team in three individual events, but could not participate when the United States boycotted the Moscow 1980 Summer Olympic Games. Four years later, he competed at the 1984 Summer Olympics in Los Angeles. As the peer-elected team captain, Jeff earned a gold medal in the men's 4×200-meter freestyle relay, and finished fourth in the individual 200-meter freestyle event. In 2016 this 4x200-meter freestyle relay was designated the third greatest of all time.

== Biography ==
At 13 months of age, Float lost most of his hearing to life-threatening viral meningitis. As a result, he is 90% deaf in his right ear and 65% in the left, thus becoming the first legally deaf athlete from the United States to win an Olympic gold medal. After swimming the third leg in the 4x200-meter freestyle relay, the US anchor slammed first to the wall by 4/100ths of a second and shattered the world record by five seconds. Once he and his triumphant teammates emerged from the pool and ascended the podium, Jeff heard a roaring crowd. "It was the first time I remember distinctly hearing loud cheers during my race at any meet. I'll never forget what 17,000 screaming people sounded like. It was incredible!" Float reports. In first grade he started training under the legendary Olympic Coach Sherm Chavoor at Arden Hills Country Club in Sacramento. His older teammates at that time were none other than Mark Spitz, Debbie Meyer, Mike Burton, John Ferris, Susie Pederson, et al., all of whom assisted in churning out 33 Olympic medals. Following graduation from Jesuit High School in Sacramento in 1978, Jeff then proceeded to obtain a bachelor's degree in psychology with a minor in business administration from the University of Southern California in Los Angeles.

Float garnered ten gold medals and World Records in all ten available events at the 1977 World Games for the Deaf (renamed Deaflympics) in Bucharest, Romania. This remains an unprecedented record. Other swimming accomplishments include: gold medal in the 400-meter freestyle at the 1978 US National Championships in Woodlands, Texas; silver medal in the 400-meter freestyle at the 1978 World Aquatics Championships in Berlin, Germany; Individual First Place in the 200 yard individual medley and 500 yard freestyle for Jesuit High School at the 1978 National Prep School Championships; gold medal in the 400-meter freestyle at the 1981 US National Championships in Brown Deer, Wisconsin; two gold medals in the 400-meter freestyle and 400-meter individual medley at the 1981 USA vs. USSR in Kiev, Russia defeating 1980 Olympic Gold Medalists Valdmir Salnikov and Sergey Fessenko; gold medal in the 400-yard individual medley at the 1982 NCAA National Championships in Indianapolis, Indiana; gold medal in the 4x200-meter freestyle relay at the 1982 World Aquatics Championships in Guayaquil, Ecuador; and gold medal in the 400-meter individual medley at the 1982 USA vs. USSR in Knoxville, Tennessee.

Sports Illustrated featured Jeff on its July 1984 cover and in three subsequent articles. Vanity Fair also selected Float and his 4x200-meter teammates for the October 1984 cover and pictorial and published a follow-up article with photographs in August 1994. Other media exposure incorporates the following: appearances on television series, commercials and live interviews; magazine and newspaper covers and related stories; and myriad book forewords, chapters and quotations. Float served on the board of directors for the California President's Council on Physical Fitness from 1985 through 2001. He was chosen as Deaf Olympian of the Century by the International Committee of Deaf Sports in 2000 and carried the Olympic Torch en route to the 1996 Atlanta Summer Olympic Games. In 2008 his boycotted 1980 USA Summer Olympic Team was bestowed with Congressional Gold Medals of Honor. Jeff is also the recipient of numerous awards and an inductee in several Halls of Fame.

After being employed for 24 years as Aquatics Director and Head Coach with Spare Time Inc. at two of its Sacramento regional facilities, 12 years with the Laguna Creek Racquet Club Gators and 12 with the Gold River Sports Club Stingrays, and Co-Head Coach of their year-round Spare Time Aquatics Sharks, Float returned to his roots. On January 1, 2020, Jeff was invited to come "home" to the Arden Hills Athletic & Social Club, where it all began over a half-century ago. There he enjoyed being the Head Coach of the Otters Swim Team, Executive Assistant Coach of the USA Swimming year-round Arden Hills Aquatics, and a personal trainer to athletes of all levels. Now coaching 1 on 1 private training, Jeff has also been a real-estate agent with Investment Property Management Inc. He and his wife Jan Ellis Float are active and longtime participants in Swim Across America, a national nonprofit organization that has earned $100 million while "Making Waves to Fight Cancer." Jeff and Jan are involved in other statewide and local charities and members of various professional and personal associations.

== See also ==
- Deaf People in the Olympics
- List of Olympic Medalists in Swimming (men)
- List of University of Southern California people
- List of World Aquatics Championships Medalists in Swimming (men)
- World Record Progression 4x200-Meter Freestyle Relay

== Bibliography ==
- De George, Matthew, Pooling Talent: Swimming's Greatest Teams, Rowman & Littlefield, Lanham, Maryland (2014). ISBN 978-1-4422-3701-8.
