= Swimming at the 1990 Commonwealth Games =

- Venue: West Auckland Swimming Centre
- Location: Auckland, New Zealand
- Dates: 24 January – 3 February 1990

Swimming at the 1990 Commonwealth Games was the 14th appearance of Swimming at the Commonwealth Games. Competition featured 32 swimming events, held in Auckland, New Zealand, from 24 January to 3 February 1990.

The events were held at the West Auckland Swimming Centre on Alderman Drive in Henderson. The venue had been specifically built for the Games but faced late issues relating to the 3,200 grandstand seating. It was however described as technologically advanced with a variable floor and movable bulkhead.

Australia topped the medal table with 21 gold medals.

== Medal table ==
* Host nation (New Zealand)

Rank	Nation	Gold	Silver	Bronze	Total
1	Australia	21	19	13	53
2	Canada	8	5	9	22
3	New Zealand*	2	2	3	7
4	England	1	6	7	14
Totals (4 entries)		32	32	32	96

== Medallists ==
Men

Event	Gold	Silver	Bronze
50 m freestyle	Andrew Baildon; Australia	Angus Waddell; Australia	Mark Foster; England
100 m freestyle	Andrew Baildon; Australia	Chris Fydler; Australia	Mike Fibbens; England
200 m freestyle	Martin Roberts; Australia	Ian Brown; Australia	Thomas Stachewicz; Australia
400 m freestyle	Ian Brown; Australia	Glen Housman; Australia	Christopher Bowie; Canada
1500 m freestyle	Glen Housman; Australia	Kieren Perkins; Australia	Mike McKenzie; Australia
100 m backstroke	Mark Tewksbury; Canada	Gary Anderson; Canada	Paul Kingsman; New Zealand
200 m backstroke	Gary Anderson; Canada	Paul Kingsman; New Zealand	Kevin Draxinger; Canada
100 m breaststroke	Adrian Moorhouse; England	James Parrack; England	Nick Gillingham; England
200 m breaststroke	Jonathan Cleveland; Canada	Rodney Lawson; Australia	Nick Gillingham; England
100 m butterfly	Andrew Baildon; Australia	Marcel Gery; Canada	Jason Cooper; Australia
200 m butterfly	Anthony Mosse; New Zealand	Martin Roberts; Australia	Jon Kelly; Canada
200 m individual medley	Gary Anderson; Canada	Robert Bruce; Australia	Martin Roberts; Australia
400 m individual medley	Robert Bruce; Australia	Rob Woodhouse; Australia	Jon Kelly; Canada
4 × 100 m freestyle relay	Australia; Andrew Baildon; Chris Fydler; Ian Vander-Wal; Jason Cooper; Matthew Renshaw; Thomas Stachewicz	England; Austyn Shortman; Mark Foster; Mike Fibbens; Neil Metcalfe; Steve Dronsfield	Canada; Blair Hicken; Darren Ward; Marcel Gery; Stephane Herbert; Stephen Vandermeulen
4 × 200 m freestyle relay	Australia; Gary Lord; Ian Brown; Martin Roberts; Thomas Stachewicz	Canada; Edward Parenti; Gary Vandermeulen; Jon Kelly; Turlough O'Hare	New Zealand; Anthony Mosse; John Steel; Richard Tapper; Ross Anderson
4 × 100 m medley relay	Canada; Jon Cleveland; Marcel Gery; Mark Tewksbury; Tom Ponting	England; Adrian Moorhouse; Austyn Shortman; Gary Binfield; Mike Fibbens	Australia; Andrew Baildon; Chris Fydler; Phil Rogers; Thomas Stachewicz

Women

Event	Gold	Silver	Bronze
50 m freestyle	Lisa Curry-Kenny; Australia	Karen van Wirdum; Australia	Andrea Nugent; Canada
100 m freestyle	Karen van Wirdum; Australia	Lisa Curry-Kenny; Australia	Trish Noall; Canada
200 m freestyle	Hayley Lewis; Australia	Jennifer McMahon; Australia	Trish Noall; Canada
400 m freestyle	Hayley Lewis; Australia	Julie McDonald; Australia	Janelle Elford; Australia
800 m freestyle	Julie McDonald; Australia	Janelle Elford; Australia	Sheridan Burge-Lopez; Australia
100 m backstroke	Nicole Livingstone; Australia	Anna Simcic; New Zealand	Johanna Griggs; Australia
200 m backstroke	Anna Simcic; New Zealand	Nicole Livingstone; Australia	Karen Lord; Australia
100 m breaststroke	Keltie Duggan; Canada	Guylaine Cloutier; Canada	Suki Brownsdon; England
200 m breaststroke	Nathalie Giguère; Canada	Guylaine Cloutier; Canada	Helen Morris; Australia
100 m butterfly	Lisa Curry-Kenny; Australia	Susie O'Neill; Australia	Madeleine Scarborough; England
200 m butterfly	Hayley Lewis; Australia	Helen Morris; Australia	Nicole Redford; Australia
200 m individual medley	Nancy Sweetnam; Canada	Jodie Clatworthy; Australia	Hayley Lewis; Australia
400 m individual medley	Hayley Lewis; Australia	Jodie Clatworthy; Australia	Donna Procter; Australia
4 × 100 m freestyle relay	Australia; Angela Mullens; Karen van Wirdum; Lisa Curry-Kenny; Susan O'Neill	Canada; Allison Higson; Erin Murphy; Kimberley Paton; Patricia Noall	England; June Croft; Karen Pickering; Sharron Davies; Zara Long
4 × 200 m freestyle relay	Australia; Hayley Lewis; Janelle Elford; Jennifer McMahon; Julie McDonald	England; Joanna Coull; Judy Lancaster; June Croft; Sharron Davies	New Zealand; Linda Robinson; Michelle Burke; Phillippa Langrell; Sharon Hanley
4 × 100 m medley relay	Australia; Karen van Wirdum; Lara Hooiveld; Lisa Curry-Kenny; Nicole Livingstone	England; Joanne Deakins; Karen Pickering; Madeleine Scarborough; Suki Brownsdon	Canada; Keltie Duggan; Lori Melien; Nancy Sweetnam; Patricia Noall

== Finals (men) ==
=== 50m freestyle ===
Pos	Athlete	Time
1	(Australia) Andrew Baildon	22.76
2	(Australia) Angus Waddell	23.03
3	(England) Mark Foster	23.16
4	(England) Mike Fibbens	23.32
5	(Australia) Matthew Renshaw	23.36
6	(New Zealand) Nicholas Sanders	23.41
7	(Canada) Marcel Gery	23.61
8	(Canada) Blair Hicken	23.74

=== 100m freestyle ===
Pos	Athlete	Time
1	(Australia) Andrew Baildon	49.80
2	(Australia) Chris Fydler	50.49
3	(England) Mike Fibbens	50.76
4	(Canada) Marcel Gery	50.82
5	(New Zealand) John Steel	51.17
6	(Australia) Gary Lord	51.37
7	(England) Austyn Shortman	51.72
8	(England) Steve Dronsfield	52.26

=== 200m freestyle ===
Pos	Athlete	Time
1	(Australia) Martin Roberts	1:49.58
2	(Australia) Ian Brown	1:49.60
3	(Australia) Thomas Stachewicz	1:49.98
4	(Canada) Turlough O'Hare	1:50.82
5	(Canada) Eddie Parenti	1:51.51
6	(England) Paul Howe	1:51.82
7	(England) Jonathan Broughton	1:52.21
8	(New Zealand) John Steel	1:53.20

=== 400m freestyle ===
Pos	Athlete	Time
1	(Australia) Ian Brown	3:49.91
2	(Australia) Glen Housman	3:53.90
3	(Canada) Chris Bowie	3:54.04
4	(Canada) Turlough O'Hare	3:54.40
5	(England) Kevin Boyd	3:55.85
6	(England) Ian Wilson	3:56.01
7	(Canada) Gary Vandermeulen	3:57.62
8	(New Zealand) Richard Tapper	4:01.11

=== 1500m freestyle ===
Pos	Athlete	Time
1	(Australia) Glen Housman	14:55.25
2	(Australia) Kieren Perkins	14:58.08
3	(Australia) Michael McKenzie	15:09.25
4	(Canada) Harry Taylor	15:12.63
5	(England) Ian Wilson	15:20.23
6	(Canada) Chris Bowie	15:29.15
7	(Canada) Paul Dashaies	15:35.81
8	(England) Kevin Boyd	15:38.85

=== 100m backstroke ===
Pos	Athlete	Time
1	(Canada) Mark Tewksbury	56.07
2	(Canada) Gary Anderson	56.84
3	(New Zealand) Paul Kingsman	57.07
4	(Canada) Kevin Draxinger	57.77
5	(New Zealand) Simon Percy	57.89
6	(Australia) Thomas Stachewicz	58.04
7	(England) Gary Binfield	58.26
8	(England) Grant Robins	58.95

=== 200m backstroke ===
Pos	Athlete	Time
1	(Canada) Gary Anderson	2:01.69
2	(New Zealand) Paul Kingsman	2:01.86
3	(Canada) Kevin Draxinger	2:02.02
4	(England) Gary Binfield	2:03.40
5	(England) Grant Robins	2:03.91
6	(England) Matthew O'Connor	2:05.66
7	(Wales) Ian Rosser	2:06.26
8	(New Zealand) Peter Doig	2:08.33

=== 100m breaststroke ===
Pos	Athlete	Time
1	(England) Adrian Moorhouse	1:01.49
2	(England) James Parrack	1:03.15
3	(England) Nick Gillingham	1:03.16
4	(Canada) Jon Cleveland	1:03.33
5	(Australia) Phil Rogers	1:03.44
6	(Australia) Brett Stocks	1:03.64
7	(Canada) Robert Fox	1:04.25
8	(Australia) Rodney Lawson	1:04.32

=== 200m breaststroke ===
Pos	Athlete	Time
1	(Canada) Jon Cleveland	2:14.96
2	(Australia) Rodney Lawson	2:15.68
3	(England) Nick Gillingham	2:16.02
4	(England) Adrian Moorhouse	2:16.06
5	(Australia) Phil Rogers	2:16.35
6	(Scotland) Neil Hudghton	2:18.85
7	(Canada) Robert Fox	2:20.14
8	(Australia) Brett Stocks	2:21.27

=== 100m butterfly ===
Pos	Athlete	Time
1	(Australia) Andrew Baildon	53.98
2	(Canada) Marcel Gery	54.42
3	(Australia) Jason Cooper	54.47
4	(New Zealand) Anthony Mosse	54.60
5	(Canada) Tom Ponting	54.72
6	(New Zealand) John Steel	55.42
7	(New Zealand) Ross Anderson	55.58
8	(England) Mike Fibbens	56.00

=== 200m butterfly ===
Pos	Athlete	Time
1	(New Zealand) Anthony Mosse	1:57.33
2	(Australia) Martin Roberts	1:59.95
3	(Canada) Jon Kelly	2:00.37
4	(Canada) Tom Ponting	2:00.41
5	(Australia) Simon McKillop-Davies	2:01.28
6	(Australia) David Wilson	2:01.68
7	(New Zealand) Ross Anderson	2:01.83
8	(Canada) Gary Vandermeulen	2:02.05

=== 200m medley ===
Pos	Athlete	Time
1	(Canada) Gary Anderson	2:02.94
2	(Australia) Robert Bruce	2:03.78
3	(Australia) Martin Roberts	2:04.03
4	(Australia) Robert Woodhouse	2:04.35
5	(England) John Davey	2:04.37
6	(Canada) Jon Kelly	2:05.32
7	(England) Gary Binfield	2:06.00
8	(Canada) Darren Ward	2:07.09

=== 400m medley ===
Pos	Athlete	Time
1	(Australia) Robert Bruce	4:20.26
2	(Australia) Robert Woodhouse	4:21.79
3	(Canada) Jon Kelly	4:23.96
4	(England) John Davey	4:24.74
5	(Scotland) Paul Brew	4:25.21
6	(New Zealand) John Munro	4:25.49
7	(England) Peter O'Sullivan	4:25.75
8	(Australia) Brent Andrew Harding	4:27.55

=== 4x100m freestyle relay ===
Pos	Athlete	Time
1	(Australia) Baildon, Fydler, Vander-Wal, Cooper, Renshaw, Stachewicz	3:20.05
2	(England) Shortman, Foster, Fibbens, Metcalfe, Dronsfield	3:22.61
3	(Canada) Hicken, Ward, Marcel Gery, Herbert, Vandermeulen	3:22.79
4	(New Zealand) Reid, Steel, Weldon, Sanders	3:25.55
5	(Scotland) McNeil, Brew, Henry, Smith, McQuaid	3:32.11
6	(Hong Kong) A. Cheung, Li, Wright, Wu Tat Cheung	3:36.60
7	(Bermuda) Morbey, Mewett, Raynor, Cash	3:37.26
8	(Isle of Man) Glover, Picken, G. Stigant, S. Stigant	3:47.36

=== 4x200m freestyle relay ===
Pos	Athlete	Time
1	(Australia) Lord, Brown, Roberts, Stachewicz	7:21.17
2	(Canada) Edward Parenti, Gary Vandermeulen, Jon Kelly, Turlough O'Hare	7:25.53
3	(New Zealand) Mosse, Steel, Tapper, Anderson	7:30.10
4	(England) Broughton, Boyd, Fibbens, Howe	7:31.04
5	(Scotland) McNeil, Brew, Henry, Smith, McQuaid	7:42.30
6	(Wales) Watkins, Jones, Day, Rosser	7:47.80
7	(Isle of Man) Glover, Picken, G. Stigant, S. Stigant	8:34.39

=== 4x100m medley relay ===
Pos	Athlete	Time
1	(Canada) Cleveland, Gery, Tewksbury, Ponting	3:42.45
2	(England) Moorhouse, Shortman, Binfield, Fibbens	3:43.88
3	(Australia) Basildon, Fydler, Rogers, Stachewicz	3:43.91
4	(New Zealand) Mosse, Steel, Paul Kingsman, Lockhart	3:45.30
5	(Scotland) McNeil, Peyrebrune, Hudghton, Leishman	3:52.49
6	(Wales) Jones, Rosser, Watkins, Brown	3:56.85
7	(Isle of Man) Glover, Picken, G. Stignant, S. Stignant	4:15.98
8	(Gibraltar) Lopez, Cassaglia, Ian Martinez, Cruz	4:17.80

== Finals (women) ==
=== 50m freestyle ===
Pos	Athlete	Time
1	(Australia) Lisa Curry-Kenny	25.80
2	(Australia) Karen Van Wirdum	26.00
3	(Canada) Andrea Nugent	26.26
4	(Canada) Kristin Topham	26.49
5	(England) Jeannette Gunston	26.54
6	(England) Caroline Woodcock	26.57
7	(Australia) Angela Mullens	26.64
8	(New Zealand) Toni Jeffs	26.68

=== 100m freestyle ===
Pos	Athlete	Time
1	(Australia) Karen Van Wirdum	56.48
2	(Australia) Lisa Curry-Kenny	56.61
3	(Canada) Patricia Noall	56.67
4	(England) Karen Pickering	57.44
5	(New Zealand) Toni Jeffs	57.82
6	(Canada) Kimberley Paton	58.07
7	(Scotland) Ruth Gilfillan	58.39
8	(England) June Croft	58.47

=== 200m freestyle ===
Pos	Athlete	Time
1	(Australia) Hayley Lewis	2:00.79
2	(Australia) Jennifer Ann McMahon	2:02.43
3	(Canada) Patricia Noall	2:02.66
4	(Canada) Allison Higson	2:03.46
5	(England) June Croft	2:03.66
6	(England) Joanna Coull	2:03.77
7	(Scotland) Ruth Gilfillan	2:04.11
8	(Australia) Janelle Elford	2:04.56

=== 400m freestyle ===
Pos	Athlete	Time
1	(Australia) Hayley Lewis	4:08.89
2	(Australia) Julie McDonald	4:09.72
3	(Australia) Janelle Elford	4:10.74
4	(New Zealand) Phillippa Langrell	4:15.64
5	(New Zealand) Linda Robinson	4:18.69
6	(Scotland) Ruth Gilfillan	4:19.34
7	(England) Karen Mellor	4:19.8
8	(Canada) Michelle Sallee	4:20.07

=== 800m freestyle ===
Pos	Athlete	Time
1	(Australia) Julie McDonald	8:30.27
2	(Australia) Janelle Elford	8:30.47
3	(Australia) Sheridan Burge-Lopez	8:36.78
4	(New Zealand) Phillippa Langrell	8:37.80
5	(England) Karen Mellor	8:43.45
6	(England) Elizabeth Arnold	8:48.27
7	(Canada) Michelle Sallee	8:51.57
8	(Canada) Joanne Currah	8:55.88

=== 100m backstroke ===
Pos	Athlete	Time
1	(Australia) Nicole Livingstone	1:02.46
2	(New Zealand) Anna Simcic	1:02.55
3	(Australia) Johanna Griggs	1:03.69
4	(England) Joanne Deakins	1:04.13
5	(Canada) Lori Melien	1:04.48
6	(England) Kathy Read	1:04.59
7	(Canada) Anne Barnes	1:04.74
8	(New Zealand) Sharon Musson	1:05.26

=== 200m backstroke ===
Pos	Athlete	Time
1	(New Zealand) Anna Simcic	2:12.32
2	(Australia) Nicole Livingstone	2:12.62
3	(Australia) Karen Lord	2:14.53
4	(England) Joanne Deakins	2:14.74
5	(England) Kathy Read	2:15.75
6	(England) Sharron Davies	2:18.12
7	(Canada) Anne Barnes	2:18.79
8	(New Zealand) Sharon Musson	2:19.09

=== 100m breaststroke ===
Pos	Athlete	Time
1	(Canada) Keltie Duggan	1:10.74
2	(Canada) Guylaine Cloutier	1:11.22
3	(England) Suki Brownsdon	1:11.54
4	(Australia) Lara Hooiveld	1:11.77
5	(Scotland) Jean Hill	1:11.85
6	(England) Lorraine Coombes	1:11.90
7	(England) Margaret Hohmann	1:12.10
8	(Canada) Nathalie Giguère	1:12.79

=== 200m breaststroke ===
Pos	Athlete	Time
1	(Canada) Nathalie Giguère	2:32.16
2	(Canada) Guylaine Cloutier	2:32.91
3	(Australia) Helen Louise Morris	2:33.57
4	(Australia) Lara Hooiveld	2:35.04
5	(Australia) Nicole Taylor	2:35.15
6	(England) Suki Brownsdon	2:35.73
7	(Scotland) Jean Hill	2:36.71
8	(New Zealand) Michaela Ross	2:38.05

=== 100m butterfly ===
Pos	Athlete	Time
1	(Australia) Lisa Curry-Kenny	1:00.66
2	(Australia) Susie O'Neill	1:01.03
3	(England) Madeleine Scarborough	1:01.33
4	(Canada) Nancy Sweetnam	1:02.15
5	(Australia) Fiona Alessandri	1:02.29
6	(England) Caroline Foot	1:02.93
7	(England) Samantha Purvis	1:03.58
8	(Canada) Kristin Topham	1:04.47

=== 200m butterfly ===
Pos	Athlete	Time
1	(Australia) Hayley Lewis	2:11.15
2	(Australia) Helen Louise Morris	2:11.76
3	(Australia) Nicole Janice Redford	2:13.53
4	(Canada) Mojca Carter	2:13.65
5	(England) Madeleine Scarborough	2:14.48
6	(England) Alyson Duffy	2:16.30
7	(England) Samantha Purvis	2:17.52
8	(New Zealand) Nichola West	2:17.93

=== 200m medley ===
Pos	Athlete	Time
1	(Canada) Nancy Sweetnam	2:15.61
2	(Australia) Jodie Clatworthy	2:17.10
3	(Australia) Hayley Lewis	2:17.13
4	(England) Zara Long	2:17.96
5	(Canada) Joanne Malar	2:18.51
6	(England) Sharron Davies	2:18.64
7	(England) Judy Lancaster	2:20.95
8	(New Zealand) Nichola West	2:22.73

=== 400m medley ===
Pos	Athlete	Time
1	(Australia) Hayley Lewis	4:42.65
2	(Australia) Jodie Clatworthy	4:45.76
3	(Australia) Donna Procter	4:47.38
4	(Canada) Nancy Sweetnam	4:49.75
5	(England) Zara Long	4:51.39
6	(Canada) Joanne Malar	4:52.35
7	(New Zealand) Linda Robinson	4:52.66
8	(New Zealand) Michaela Ross	4:57.03

=== 4x100m freestyle relay ===
Pos	Athlete	Time
1	(Australia) Mullens, van Wirdum, Curry-Kenny, O'Neill	3:46.85
2	(Canada) Higson, Murphy, Paton, Noall	3:48.69
3	(England) Croft, Pickering, Davies, Long	3:51.26
4	(New Zealand) Jeffs, Burke, Luff, Hanley	3:52.70
5	(Scotland) Donnelly, Sheppard, Gilfillan, McHarg	3:56.21
6	(Wales) Jones, Evans, Henwood, Mansfield	3:57.17

=== 4x200m freestyle relay ===
Pos	Athlete	Time
1	(Australia) Lewis, Elford, McMahon, McDonald	8:08.95
2	(England) Coull, Lancaster, Croft, Davies	8:16.31
3	(New Zealand) Robinson, Burke, Langrell, Hanley	8:22.60
4	(Scotland) Hill, Donnelly, Sheppard, Gilfillan	8:26.95
5	(Wales) Jones, Evans, Henwood, Mansfield	8:40.58
6	(Canada) Higson, Murphy, Paton, Noall	disq+

+Canada finished first but were disqualified for a faulty changeover.

=== 4x100m medley relay ===
Pos	Athlete	Time
1	(Australia) van Wirdum, Hooiveld, Curry-Kenny, Livingstone	4:10.87
2	(England) Deakins, Pickering, Scarborough, Brownsdon	4:11.88
3	(Canada) Duggan, Melien, Sweetnam, Noall	4:12.20
4	(New Zealand) Simic, Bates, Rodahl, Jeffs	4:20.35
5	(Scotland) Sheppard, Hill, Ewing, Gilfillan	4:23.97
6	(Wales) Evans, Henwood, Mansfield, Lock	4:24.52
