= Australia at the 1990 Commonwealth Games =

- CG code: AUS
- CGA: Australian Commonwealth Games Association
- Website: commonwealthgames.org.au

in Auckland, New Zealand
- Competitors: 247 in 11 sports
- Flag bearers: Opening: Lisa Curry-Kenny; Closing:Phillip Adams
- Officials: 68
- Medals Ranked 1st: Gold 52 Silver 54 Bronze 58 Total 164

Commonwealth Games appearances (overview)
- 1930; 1934; 1938; 1950; 1954; 1958; 1962; 1966; 1970; 1974; 1978; 1982; 1986; 1990; 1994; 1998; 2002; 2006; 2010; 2014; 2018; 2022; 2026; 2030

Australia participated at the 1990 Commonwealth Games, held in Auckland, New Zealand. This was their fourteenth Commonwealth Games appearance having participated in all Games since inception.

== Medallists ==
'The following Australian competitors won medals at the games.

| Medal | Name | Sport | Event |
|---|---|---|---|
| Gold | Darren Clark | Athletics | Men's 400 metres |
| Gold | Andrew Lloyd | Athletics | Men's 5000 metres |
| Gold | Simon Arkell | Athletics | Men's pole vault |
| Gold | Sean Carlin | Athletics | Men's hammer throw |
| Gold | Lisa Martin | Athletics | Women's marathon |
| Gold | Monique Dunstan; Kathy Sambell; Cathy Freeman; Kerry Johnson | Athletics | Women's 4 x 100 metres |
| Gold | Kerry Saxby-Junna | Athletics | Women's 10 km walk |
| Gold | Jane Flemming | Athletics | Women's long jump |
| Gold | Jane Flemming | Athletics | Women's heptathlon |
| Gold | Lisa-Marie Vizaniari | Athletics | Women's discus |
| Gold | Robert Parrella | Bowls | Men's Singles |
| Gold | Ian Schuback; Trevor Morris | Bowls | Men's Pairs |
| Gold | Audrey Rutherford; Daphne Shaw; Dorothy Roche; Marion Stevens | Bowls | Women's fours |
| Gold | Martin Vinnicombe | Cycling | Men's Time Trial |
| Gold | Gary Neiwand | Cycling | Men's Sprint |
| Gold | Robert Burns | Cycling | Men's Points Race |
| Gold | Kathy Watt | Cycling | Women's Road Race |
| Gold | Russell Butler | Diving | Men's 1m Springboard |
| Gold | Craig Rogerson | Diving | Men's 3m Springboard |
| Gold | Jenny Donnet | Diving | Women's 3m Springboard |
| Gold | Brennon Dowrick | Gymnastics | Men's Pommel Horse |
| Gold | Monique Allen | Gymnastics | Women's Uneven Bars |
| Gold | Phil Adams | Shooting | Men's 50m Free Pistol |
| Gold | Phil Adams; Bengt Sandström | Shooting | Men's 50m Free Pistol – Pairs |
| Gold | Phil Adams; Bruce Quick | Shooting | 25m Centre-Fire Pistol – Pairs |
| Gold | Bruce Favell; Pat Murray | Shooting | 25m Rapid-Fire Pistol – Pairs |
| Gold | Bengt Sandström | Shooting | Men's 10m Air Pistol |
| Gold | Colin Robertson | Shooting | Men's 10m Running Target |
| Gold | John Maxwell | Shooting | Men's Trap |
| Gold | Andrew Baildon | Swimming | Men's 50 metres Freestyle |
| Gold | Andrew Baildon | Swimming | Men's 100 metres Freestyle |
| Gold | Andrew Baildon | Swimming | Men's 100 metres Butterfly |
| Gold | Martin Roberts | Swimming | Men's 200 metres Freestyle |
| Gold | Ian Brown | Swimming | Men's 400 metres Freestyle |
| Gold | Glen Housman | Swimming | Men's 1500 metres Freestyle |
| Gold | Robert Bruce | Swimming | Men's 400 metres Individual Medley |
| Gold | Andrew Baildon; Chris Fydler; Ian Vander-Wal; Jason Cooper; Matthew Renshaw; Thomas Stachewicz | Swimming | Men's 4 x 100 metres Freestyle Relay |
| Gold | Gary Lord; Ian Brown; Martin Roberts; Thomas Stachewicz | Swimming | Men's 4 x 200 metres Freestyle Relay |
| Gold | Lisa Curry-Kenny | Swimming | Women's 50 metres Freestyle |
| Gold | Karen van Wirdum | Swimming | Women's 100 metres Freestyle |
| Gold | Hayley Lewis | Swimming | Women's 200 metres Freestyle |
| Gold | Hayley Lewis | Swimming | Women's 400 metres Freestyle |
| Gold | Julie McDonald | Swimming | Women's 800 metres Freestyle |
| Gold | Nicole Livingstone | Swimming | Women's 100 metres Backstroke |
| Gold | Lisa Curry-Kenny | Swimming | Women's 100 metres Butterfly |
| Gold | Hayley Lewis | Swimming | Women's 200 metres Butterfly |
| Gold | Hayley Lewis | Swimming | Women's 400 metres Individual Medley |
| Gold | Angela Mullens; Karen van Wirdum; Lisa Curry-Kenny; Susan O'Neill | Swimming | Women's 4 x 100 metres Freestyle Relay |
| Gold | Hayley Lewis; Janelle Elford; Jennifer McMahon; Julie McDonald | Swimming | Women's 4 x 200 metres Freestyle Relay |
| Gold | Karen van Wirdum; Lara Hooiveld; Lisa Curry-Kenny; Nicole Livingstone | Swimming | Women's 4 x 100 metres Medley Relay |
| Gold | Ron Laycock | Weightlifting | Men's Middleweight – Clean and Jerk |
| Gold | Ron Laycock | Weightlifting | Men's Middleweight – Overall |
| Silver | Steve Moneghetti | Athletics | Men's marathon |
| Silver | Andrew Jachno | Athletics | Men's 30 km walk |
| Silver | David Culbert | Athletics | Men's long jump |
| Silver | Werner Reiterer | Athletics | Men's discus throw |
| Silver | Kerry Johnson | Athletics | Women's 100 metres |
| Silver | Kerry Johnson | Athletics | Women's 200 metres |
| Silver | Tani Ruckle | Athletics | Women's marathon |
| Silver | Debbie Flintoff-King | Athletics | Women's 400 metres hurdles |
| Silver | Maree Holland; Sharon Stewart; Susan Andrews; Debbie Flintoff-King | Athletics | Women's 4 x 400 metres |
| Silver | Sue Howland | Athletics | Women's javelin throw |
| Silver | Sharon Jaklofsky-Smith | Athletics | Women's heptathlon |
| Silver | Edda Bonutto; Maureen Hobbs | Bowls | Women's pairs |
| Silver | Justin Rowsell | Boxing | Men's lightweight |
| Silver | Mark Kingsland | Cycling | Men's Individual Pursuit |
| Silver | Brett Aitken; Steve McGlede; Shaun O'Brien; Darren Winter | Cycling | Men's Team Pursuit |
| Silver | Shaun O'Brien | Cycling | Men's 10 Mile Scratch Race |
| Silver | Julie Speight | Cycling | Women's Sprint |
| Silver | Kathy Watt | Cycling | Women's Individual Pursuit |
| Silver | April Adams | Diving | Women's 10 m Platform |
| Silver | Ken Meredith | Gymnastics | Men's Parallel Bars |
| Silver | Tim Lees | Gymnastics | Men's Pommel Horse |
| Silver | Monique Allen | Gymnastics | Women's All Around |
| Silver | Monique Allen; Kylie Shadbolt; Lisa Read; Michelle Telfer | Gymnastics | Women's Team |
| Silver | Dean Lampkin | Judo | Men's half heavyweight |
| Silver | Suzanne Williams | Judo | Women's lightweight |
| Silver | Geraldine Dekker | Judo | Women's heavyweight |
| Silver | Bengt Sandström | Shooting | Men's 50m Free Pistol |
| Silver | Pat Murray | Shooting | Men's 25m Rapid-Fire Pistol |
| Silver | Phil Adams | Shooting | Men's 10m Air Pistol |
| Silver | Phil Adams; Bengt Sandström | Shooting | Men's 10m Air Pistol – Pairs |
| Silver | James Corbett; Barry Wood | Shooting | Men's Full Bore Rifle – Pairs |
| Silver | Angus Waddell | Swimming | Men's 50 metres Freestyle |
| Silver | Chris Fydler | Swimming | Men's 100 metres Freestyle |
| Silver | Ian Brown | Swimming | Men's 200 metres Freestyle |
| Silver | Glen Housman | Swimming | Men's 400 metres Freestyle |
| Silver | Kieran Perkins | Swimming | Men's 1500 metres Freestyle |
| Silver | Rodney Lawson | Swimming | Men's 200 metres Breaststroke |
| Silver | Martin Roberts | Swimming | Men's 200 metres Butterfly |
| Silver | Robert Bruce | Swimming | Men's 200 metres Individual Medley |
| Silver | Rob Woodhouse | Swimming | Men's 400 metres Individual Medley |
| Silver | Karen van Wirdum | Swimming | Women's 50 metres Freestyle |
| Silver | Lisa Curry-Kenny | Swimming | Women's 100 metres Freestyle |
| Silver | Jennifer McMahon | Swimming | Women's 200 metres Freestyle |
| Silver | Julie McDonald | Swimming | Women's 400 metres Freestyle |
| Silver | Janelle Elford | Swimming | Women's 800 metres Freestyle |
| Silver | Nicole Livingstone | Swimming | Women's 200 metres Backstroke |
| Silver | Susie O'Neill | Swimming | Women's 100 metres Butterfly |
| Silver | Helen Morris | Swimming | Women's 200 metres Butterfly |
| Silver | Jodie Clatworthy | Swimming | Women's 200 metres Individual Medley |
| Silver | Jodie Clatworthy | Swimming | Women's 400 metres Individual Medley |
| Silver | Gregory Hayman | Weightlifting | Men's Flyweight – Clean and Jerk |
| Silver | Jason Roberts | Weightlifting | Men's Heavyweight – Clean and Jerk |
| Silver | Jason Roberts | Weightlifting | Men's Heavyweight – Snatch |
| Silver | Jason Roberts | Weightlifting | Men's Heavyweight – Overall |
| Bronze | Paul Nandapi | Athletics | Men's discus throw |
| Bronze | Sharon Stewart | Athletics | Women's 800 metres |
| Bronze | Jenny Laurendet | Athletics | Women's 400 metres hurdles |
| Bronze | Astra Vitols | Athletics | Women's discus |
| Bronze | Kate Farrow | Athletics | Women's javelin |
| Bronze | James Nicolson | Boxing | Men's featherweight |
| Bronze | Stefan Scriggins | Boxing | Men's light welterweight |
| Bronze | Grahame Cheney | Boxing | Men's welterweight |
| Bronze | Darren Winter | Cycling | Men's Individual Pursuit |
| Bronze | Steve McGlede | Cycling | Men's 10 Mile Scratch Race |
| Bronze | Kathleen Shannon | Cycling | Women's Road Race |
| Bronze | Simon McCormack | Diving | Men's 1m Springboard |
| Bronze | Peta Taylor | Diving | Women's 1m Springboard |
| Bronze | Brennon Dowrick; Kenneth Meredith; Peter Hogan; Tim Lees | Gymnastics | Men's Team |
| Bronze | Brennon Dowrick | Gymnastics | Men's Horizontal Bar |
| Bronze | Peter Hogan | Gymnastics | Men's Parallel Bars |
| Bronze | Tim Lees | Gymnastics | Men's Vault |
| Bronze | Ken Meredith | Gymnastics | Men's Rings |
| Bronze | Kylie Shadbolt | Gymnastics | Women's All Around |
| Bronze | Michelle Telfer | Gymnastics | Women's Uneven Bars |
| Bronze | Kylie Shadbolt | Gymnastics | Women's Beam |
| Bronze | Monique Allen | Gymnastics | Women's Vault |
| Bronze | Kylie Shadbolt | Gymnastics | Women's Floor |
| Bronze | Gavin Kelly | Judo | Men's half middleweight |
| Bronze | Chris Bacon | Judo | Men's middleweight |
| Bronze | Julie Reardon | Judo | Women's extra lightweight |
| Bronze | Catherine Grainger | Judo | Women's half lightweight |
| Bronze | Narelle Hill | Judo | Women's middleweight |
| Bronze | Geraldine Dekker | Judo | Women's open |
| Bronze | Bruce Quick | Shooting | Men's 25m Centre-Fire Pistol |
| Bronze | James Corbett | Shooting | Men's Full Bore Rifle |
| Bronze | Russell Mark; John Maxwell | Shooting | Men's Trap – Pairs |
| Bronze | Thomas Stachewicz | Swimming | Men's 200 metres Freestyle |
| Bronze | Michael McKenzie | Swimming | Men's 1500 metres Freestyle |
| Bronze | Jason Cooper | Swimming | Men's 100 metres Butterfly |
| Bronze | Martin Roberts | Swimming | Men's 200 metres Individual Medley |
| Bronze | Andrew Baildon; Chris Fydler; Phil Rogers; Thomas Stachewicz | Swimming | Men's 4 x 100 metres Medley Relay |
| Bronze | Janelle Elford | Swimming | Women's 400 metres Freestyle |
| Bronze | Sheridan Burge-Lopez | Swimming | Women's 800 metres Freestyle |
| Bronze | Johanna Griggs | Swimming | Women's 100 metres Backstroke |
| Bronze | Karen Lord | Swimming | Women's 200 metres Backstroke |
| Bronze | Helen Morris | Swimming | Women's 200 metres Breaststroke |
| Bronze | Nicole Redford | Swimming | Women's 200 metres Butterfly |
| Bronze | Hayley Lewis | Swimming | Women's 200 metres Individual Medley |
| Bronze | Donna Proctor | Swimming | Women's 400 metres Individual Medley |
| Bronze | Semon Rohloff | Synchronised Swimming | Women's Solo |
| Bronze | Semon Rohloff; Lisa Lieschke | Synchronised Swimming | Women's Duet |
| Bronze | Gregory Hayman | Weightlifting | Men's Flyweight – Snatch |
| Bronze | Gregory Hayman | Weightlifting | Men's Flyweight – Overall |
| Bronze | Mark Blair | Weightlifting | Men's Lightweight – Snatch |
| Bronze | Ron Laycock | Weightlifting | Men's Middleweight – Snatch |
| Bronze | Damian Brown | Weightlifting | Men's Middleweight – Clean and Jerk |
| Bronze | Harvey Goodman | Weightlifting | Men's Middle Heavyweight – Snatch |
| Bronze | Harvey Goodman | Weightlifting | Men's Middle Heavyweight – Clean and Jerk |
| Bronze | Harvey Goodman | Weightlifting | Men's Middle Heavyweight – Overall |
| Bronze | Steven Kettner | Weightlifting | Men's Super Heavyweight – Snatch |
| Bronze | Steven Kettner | Weightlifting | Men's Super Heavyweight – Clean and Jerk |
| Bronze | Steven Kettner | Weightlifting | Men's Super Heavyweight – Overall |

Medals by sport
| Sport | 1st place, gold medalist(s) | 2nd place, silver medalist(s) | 3rd place, bronze medalist(s) | |
| Swimming | 21 | 19 | 13 | 53 |
| Athletics | 10 | 11 | 5 | 26 |
| Shooting | 7 | 5 | 3 | 15 |
| Cycling | 4 | 5 | 3 | 12 |
| Weightlifting | 2 | 4 | 11 | 17 |
| Diving | 3 | 1 | 2 | 6 |
| Lawn bowls | 3 | 1 | 0 | 4 |
| Gymnastics | 2 | 4 | 10 | 16 |
| Judo | 0 | 3 | 6 | 9 |
| Boxing | 0 | 1 | 3 | 4 |
| Synchronised Swimming | 0 | 0 | 2 | 2 |
| Total | 52 | 54 | 58 | 164 |

== Australian team ==
The Australian Team also included triathletes for the first time, as the sport made its Commonwealth Games debut as a demonstration sport. The triathlon team included just one athlete, Michellie Jones, who would go on represent Australia at the Olympic Games, a decade later in Sydney when triathlon officially debuted on the world stage.

== See also ==
- Australia at the 1988 Summer Olympics
- Australia at the 1992 Summer Olympics
