= 1987 Australian Swimming Championships =

The 1987 Australian Swimming Championships were held at the Beatty Park Pool in Perth, Western Australia from Thursday 26 February to Sunday 1 March. They were organised by Australian Swimming.

== Medal winners ==
=== Men's events ===
Event	Gold		Silver		Bronze	
50 m freestyle	Roberto Gleria; Cabramatta (NSW)	23.65	Thomas Stachewicz; Beatty Park/WAIS (WA)	23.98	Dominic Sheldrick; City of Perth (WA)	24.11
100 m freestyle	Thomas Stachewicz; Beatty Park/WAIS (WA)	51.36	Roberto Gleria; Cabramatta (NSW)	51.45	Matthew Renshaw; ACI Carlile (NSW)	52.33
200 m freestyle	Roberto Gleria; Cabramatta (NSW)	1:49.71 ACR	Thomas Stachewicz; Beatty Park/WAIS (WA)	1:50.08	Jason Plummer; St. Peters (Qld)	1:52.60
400 m freestyle	Roberto Gleria; Cabramatta (NSW)	3:54.47	Duncan Armstrong; ACI Lawrence (Qld)	3:55.27	Jason Plummer; St. Peters (Qld)	3:58.55
800 m freestyle	Michael McKenzie; Palm Beach-Currumbin (Qld)	8:10.70	Stuart Feenstra; Poseidon (NSW)	8:11.11	David O'Brien; Olympia (NSW)	8:21.52
1500 m freestyle	Jason Plummer; St. Peters (Qld)	15:23.79	Michael McKenzie; Palm Beach-Currumbin (Qld)	15:40.55	David O'Brien; Olympia (NSW)	15:54.73
50 m backstroke	Martin Davies; Melbourne Aquatic (Vic)	27.46	Robert Whyte; Academy (NSW)	27.54	Matthew Renshaw; ACI Carlile (NSW)	27.77
100 m backstroke	Thomas Stachewicz; Beatty Park/WAIS (WA)	58.18	Simon Upton; ACI Carlile (NSW)	58.95	Matthew Renshaw; ACI Carlile (NSW)	59.43
200 m backstroke	Simon Upton; ACI Carlile (NSW)	2:04.20	Martin Roberts; Marion (SA)	2:06.99	Colin Irvine; Hunter (NSW)	2:08.74
50 m breaststroke	Rodney Lawson; Melbourne Aquatic (Vic)	29.48 AR, ACR	Peter Evans; City of Perth (WA)	30.44	James Legge; City of Perth (WA)	30.69
100 m breaststroke	Rodney Lawson; Melbourne Aquatic (Vic)	1:04.00	Ian McAdam; Academy (NSW)	1:06.49	Brad Simpson; MLC Leander (Qld)	1:06.63
200 m breaststroke	Rodney Lawson; Melbourne Aquatic (Vic)	2:20.62	Paul Lee; Victoria Park Carlisle (WA)	2:23.27	Ian McAdam; Academy (NSW)	2:23.67
50 m butterfly	Barry Armstrong; Carine/WAIS (WA)	25.53	Jon Sieben; ACI Lawrence (Qld)	25.96	Robert Bruce; ACI Carlile (NSW)	26.11
100 m butterfly	Barry Armstrong; Carine/WAIS (WA)	55.85	David Wilson; ACI Vicentre (Vic)	56.54	Jon Sieben; ACI Lawrence (Qld)	56.65 (Note: This time was incorrectly listed as 56.56 in the Annual Report.)
200 m butterfly	David Wilson; ACI Vicentre (Vic)	2:02.05	Anthony McDonald; Beatty Park/WAIS (WA)	2:04.81	Ian Brown; Maida Vale (WA)	2:05.43
200 m individual medley	Anthony McDonald; Beatty Park/WAIS (WA)	2:07.17	Brent Harding; Academy (NSW)	2:08.19	Paul Lee; Victoria Park Carlisle (WA)	2:08.23
400 m individual medley	Anthony McDonald; Beatty Park/WAIS (WA)	4:31.03	Paul Lee; Victoria Park Carlisle (WA)	4:31.81	Brent Harding; Academy (NSW)	4:33.72
4 × 100 m state freestyle relay	New South Wales	3:31.40	Queensland	3:32.78	Western Australia	3:40.53
4 × 200 m state freestyle relay	New South Wales	7:39.09	Queensland	7:39.85		
4 × 100 m state medley relay	New South Wales	3:55.08	Western Australia	3:56.65	Queensland	4:05.56
4 × 100 m club freestyle relay	ACI Carlile A (NSW)	3:31.79	Beatty Park (WA)	3:35.55	ACI Lawrence (Qld)	3:36.68
4 × 200 m club freestyle relay						
4 × 100 m club medley relay	Melbourne Aquatic (Vic)	3:55.93	ACI Carlile A (NSW)	3:57.37	City of Perth 1 (WA)	3:59.98

Legend: AR – Australian record; ACR – Australian All Comers record

=== Women's events ===
Event	Gold		Silver		Bronze	
50 m freestyle	Annemarie Verstappen; Netherlands	26.45	Angela Harris; Commercial (Qld)	26.72	Karen van Wirdum; FAI St. Bernadette's (Qld)	26.77
100 m freestyle	Annemarie Verstappen; Netherlands	57.22	Angela Harris; Commercial (Qld)	57.62	Julie Pugh; FAI St. Bernadette's (Qld)	57.68
200 m freestyle	Julie McDonald; ACI Lawrence (Qld)	2:02.83	Annemarie Verstappen; Netherlands	2:03.16	Sheridan Burge-Lopez; ACI Carlile (NSW)	2:03.61
400 m freestyle	Janelle Elford; Carss Park (NSW)	4:11.17	Julie McDonald; ACI Lawrence (Qld)	4:14.67	Sheridan Burge-Lopez; ACI Carlile (NSW)	4:15.09
800 m freestyle	Janelle Elford; Carss Park (NSW)	8:31.37	Julie McDonald; ACI Lawrence (Qld)	8:36.25	Sheridan Burge-Lopez; ACI Carlile (NSW)	8:40.42
1500 m freestyle	Janelle Elford; Carss Park (NSW)	16:10.11	Julie McDonald; ACI Lawrence (Qld)	16:22.44	Sheridan Burge-Lopez; ACI Carlile (NSW)	16:33.80
50 m backstroke	Nicole Livingstone; ACI Vicentre (Vic)	30.79	Annemarie Verstappen; Netherlands	30.91	Karen Lord; Shellharbour-Warilla (NSW)	31.28
100 m backstroke	Nicole Livingstone; ACI Vicentre (Vic)	1:04.65	Annemarie Verstappen; Netherlands	1:05.41	Karen Lord; Shellharbour-Warilla (NSW)	1:05.59
200 m backstroke	Nicole Livingstone; ACI Vicentre (Vic)	2:14.40	Karen Lord; Shellharbour-Warilla (NSW)	2:18.29	Pippa Downes; Palm Beach-Currumbin (Qld)	2:19.72
50 m breaststroke	Lara Hooiveld; MLC Leander (Qld)	32.63 AR, ACR	Claudia Dullo; Academy (NSW)	33.20	Kelly Armstrong; Carine/WAIS (WA)	33.83
100 m breaststroke	Lara Hooiveld; MLC Leander (Qld)	1:12.65	Dimity Douglas; MLC Leander (Qld)	1:13.28	Claudia Dullo; Academy (NSW)	1:13.33
200 m breaststroke	Angie Greenwood; Morgan/Miami (Qld)	2:34.40	Kellie Lowns; Morgan/Miami (Qld)	2:36.85	Dimity Douglas; MLC Leander (Qld)	2:37.12
50 m butterfly	Fiona Alessandri; Beatty Park/WAIS (WA)	29.02	Angela Harris; Commercial (Qld)	29.04	Jacki Grant; FAI St. Bernadette's (Qld)	29.23
100 m butterfly	Fiona Alessandri; Beatty Park/WAIS (WA)	1:03.79	Megan Johnston; Gladstone (Qld)	1:03.94	Colette Gunn; ACI Lawrence (Qld)	1:04.42
200 m butterfly	Megan Johnston; Gladstone (Qld)	2:16.21	Lisa Fildes; Palm Beach-Currumbin (Qld)	2:17.87	Bronwyn Burns; Carss Park (NSW)	2:18.05
200 m individual medley	Jodie Clatworthy; ACI Lawrence (Qld)	2:20.67	Pippa Downes; Palm Beach-Currumbin (Qld)	2:21.85	Colette Gunn; ACI Lawrence (Qld)	2:22.85
400 m individual medley	Janelle Elford; Carss Park (NSW)	4:52.16	Jodie Clatworthy; ACI Lawrence (Qld)	4:56.95	Donna Procter; Hunter (NSW)	4:58.80
4 × 100 m state freestyle relay	Queensland	3:54.14	New South Wales	4:01.10	Western Australia	4:03.28
4 × 200 m state freestyle relay	Queensland	8:28.75	New South Wales	8:35.40		
4 × 100 m state medley relay	New South Wales	4:22.98	Queensland	4:23.31	Western Australia	4:31.86
4 × 100 m club freestyle relay	FAI St. Bernadette's Gold (Qld)	3:55.57	ACI Lawrence Mudcrabs (Qld)	3:59.48	ACI Lawrence Dolphins (Qld)	3:59.66
4 × 200 m club freestyle relay	ACI Lawrence Mudcrabs (Qld)	8:31.66	FAI St. Bernadette's Gold (Qld)	8:35.63	ACI Carlile (NSW)	8:42.64
4 × 100 m club medley relay						

Legend: AR – Australian record; ACR – Australian All Comers record
