= 1986 Australian Short Course Swimming Championships =

The 1986 Australian Short Course Swimming Championships were held at the Mowbray Pool in Launceston, Tasmania from Friday 5 September to Sunday 7 September. They were organised by Australian Swimming.

== Medal winners ==
=== Men's events ===
Event	Gold		Silver		Bronze	
50 m freestyle	Thomas Stachewicz; Beatty Park (WA)	23.98	Dominic Sheldrick; City of Perth (WA)	24.03	Gary Lord; Shellharbour-Warilla (NSW)	24.12
100 m freestyle	Roberto Gleria; Cabramatta (NSW)	51.13	Gary Lord; Shellharbour-Warilla (NSW)	51.20	Thomas Stachewicz; Beatty Park (WA)	51.32
200 m freestyle	Thomas Stachewicz; Beatty Park (WA)	1:50.92	Roberto Gleria; Cabramatta (NSW)	1:51.10	Ian Brown; Maida Vale (WA)	1:51.29
400 m freestyle	Ian Brown; Maida Vale (WA)	3:53.88	Martin Roberts; Marion (SA)	3:55.17	Matthew Brown; Maida Vale (WA)	3:57.00
800 m freestyle	Stuart Feenstra; Olympia (NSW)	7:57.31 AR, =ACR	Matthew Brown; Maida Vale (WA)	7:57.75	Ian Brown; Maida Vale (WA)	8:03.11
1500 m freestyle	Stuart Feenstra; Olympia (NSW)	15:10.66	Matthew Brown; Maida Vale (WA)	15:15.50	David O'Brien; Roselands (NSW)	15:37.58 (Note: The Annual Report lists Jamie King of British Columbia finishing third in a time of 15:42.34.)
50 m backstroke	Martin Davies; CIG Burley Griffin (ACT)	26.58 AR	David Morarty; ACI Vicentre (Vic)	27.54	Robert Whyte; Wales Smithfield (NSW)	27.76
100 m backstroke	Martin Davies; CIG Burley Griffin (ACT)	57.46	David Morarty; ACI Vicentre (Vic)	58.29	Simon Upton; ACI Carlile (NSW)	58.30
200 m backstroke	Simon Upton; ACI Carlile (NSW)	2:02.47	Martin Davies; CIG Burley Griffin (ACT)	2:02.93	Craig Boettcher; Hunter (NSW)	2:05.34
50 m breaststroke	David Moon; MLC Leander (Qld)	29.99	Brad Simpson; MLC Leander (Qld)	30.15	James Legge; City of Perth (WA)	30.88
100 m breaststroke	Brad Simpson; MLC Leander (Qld)	1:04.42	Ian McAdam; Wales (NSW)	1:05.75	Gary Barclay; Melbourne Aquatic (Vic)	1:05.99
200 m breaststroke	Brad Simpson; MLC Leander (Qld)	2:17.97	Ian McAdam; Wales (NSW)	2:18.12	Gary Barclay; Melbourne Aquatic (Vic)	2:20.47
50 m butterfly	Ian Brown; Maida Vale (WA)	25.79 (Note: This time was incorrectly listed as 23.79 in the Annual Report.)	Mark Weldon; New Zealand	26.00	Anthony McDonald; Beatty Park (WA)	26.31
100 m butterfly	Ian Brown; Maida Vale (WA)	55.38	Anthony McDonald; Beatty Park (WA)	56.16	David Wilson; ACI Vicentre (Vic)	56.30
200 m butterfly	David Wilson; ACI Vicentre (Vic)	1:59.25 AR	Ian Brown; Maida Vale (WA)	1:59.32	Paul Block; British Columbia	2:04.82
200 m individual medley	Ian McAdam; Wales (NSW); Martin Roberts; Marion (SA)	2:04.92			Vincent Cossetto; CIG Burley Griffin (ACT)	2:05.75
400 m individual medley	Martin Roberts; Marion (SA)	4:22.63	Matthew Brown; Maida Vale (WA)	4:24.53	Craig Boettcher; Hunter (NSW)	4:24.82
4 × 100 m freestyle relay	New South Wales	3:28.50	ACI Carlile A (NSW)	3:29.23	Western Australia	3:29.36
4 × 200 m freestyle relay	New South Wales	7:40.29	ACI Vicentre (Vic)	7:43.16	British Columbia	7:43.83
4 × 100 m medley relay	New South Wales	3:51.30 (Note: This time was incorrectly listed as 3:53.30 in the Annual Report.)	ACI Vicentre (Vic)	3:51.58	Western Australia	3:54.07

Legend: AR – Australian record; ACR – Australian All Comers record

=== Women's events ===
Event	Gold		Silver		Bronze	
50 m freestyle	Andrea Houlden; ACI Vicentre (Vic)	27.27	Narelle Marks; Acacia (Qld)	27.49	Jaye Butler; ACI Carlile (NSW)	27.60
100 m freestyle	Carolyn Reid; ACI Lawrence (Qld)	57.99	Anne McCloghry; Bluehaven Toongabbie (NSW)	59.35	Andrea Houlden; ACI Vicentre (Vic)	59.47
200 m freestyle	Donna Procter; Hunter (NSW)	2:02.96	Carolyn Reid; ACI Lawrence (Qld)	2:04.09	Sheridan Burge-Lopez; ACI Carlile (NSW)	2:04.43
400 m freestyle	Donna Procter; Hunter (NSW)	4:14.29	Sheridan Burge-Lopez; ACI Carlile (NSW)	4:15.68	Krista Muir; Morgan/Miami (Qld)	4:19.03
800 m freestyle	Donna Procter; Hunter (NSW)	8:35.19	Kim Bowerman; Cabramatta (NSW)	8:48.14 (Note: The Annual Report lists Maura Connolly of ACI Lawrence finishing second in a time of 8:52.20.)	Sheridan Burge-Lopez; ACI Carlile (NSW)	8:48.54 (Note: The Annual Report lists Jacqui Greaves of CIG Burley Griffin finishing third in a time of 8:56.30.)
1500 m freestyle	Maura Connolly; ACI Lawrence (Qld)	16:44.07	Michelle Gallen; CIG Burley Griffin (ACT)	16:44.85	Kim Bowerman; Cabramatta (NSW)	16:49.14
50 m backstroke	Karen Lord; Shellharbour-Warilla (NSW)	30.29	Pippa Downes; CIG Burley Griffin (ACT)	30.56	Nicole Livingstone; ACI Vicentre (Vic)	30.93
100 m backstroke	Pippa Downes; CIG Burley Griffin (ACT)	1:04.36	Karen Lord; Shellharbour-Warilla (NSW)	1:04.50	Astrid Howton; Bluehaven Toongabbie (NSW)	1:05.59
200 m backstroke	Pippa Downes; CIG Burley Griffin (ACT)	2:16.35	Karen Lord; Shellharbour-Warilla (NSW)	2:16.43	Astrid Howton; Bluehaven Toongabbie (NSW)	2:17.70
50 m breaststroke	Lara Hooiveld; MLC Leander (Qld)	32.72 AR	Claudia Dullo; Wales (NSW)	33.14	Louise Bastian; Norwood (SA)	33.90
100 m breaststroke	Claudia Dullo; Wales (NSW)	1:09.78 AR, ACR	Lara Hooiveld; MLC Leander (Qld)	1:11.37	Kellie Lowns; Morgan/Miami (Qld)	1:12.86
200 m breaststroke	Kellie Lowns; Morgan/Miami (Qld)	2:34.84	Angie Greenwood; Morgan/Miami (Qld)	2:35.20	Louise Bastian; Norwood (SA)	2:38.12
50 m butterfly	Narelle Marks; Acacia (Qld)	29.02	Krista Muir; Morgan/Miami (Qld)	29.19	Fiona Alessandri; Beatty Park (WA)	29.32
100 m butterfly	Krista Muir; Morgan/Miami (Qld)	1:03.92	Celina Hardy; Wales (NSW)	1:03.95	Narelle Marks; Acacia (Qld)	1:04.21
200 m butterfly	Celina Hardy; Wales (NSW)	2:16.87	Jennie Whitford; Marion (SA)	2:17.63	Krista Muir; Morgan/Miami (Qld)	2:17.94
200 m individual medley	Donna Procter; Hunter (NSW)	2:19.41	Pippa Downes; CIG Burley Griffin (ACT)	2:19.98	Jennie Whitford; Marion (SA)	2:20.05
400 m individual medley	Donna Procter; Hunter (NSW)	4:50.41	Jennie Whitford; Marion (SA)	4:58.60	Linda Jesson; Rockdale (NSW)	4:58.99
4 × 100 m freestyle relay	New South Wales	3:57.60	ACI Carlile (NSW)	3:57.90	Morgan/Miami (Qld)	4:02.58
4 × 200 m freestyle relay	New South Wales	8:28.14	ACI Carlile (NSW)	8:31.61	Morgan/Miami (Qld)	8:35.44
4 × 100 m medley relay	Wales (NSW)	4:23.38	New South Wales	4:26.26	Beatty Park (WA)	4:30.91

Legend: AR – Australian record; ACR – Australian All Comers record
