= New Zealand at the 1990 Commonwealth Games =

- CGF code: NZL
- CGA: New Zealand Olympic and Commonwealth Games Association
- Website: www.olympic.org.nz

in Auckland, New Zealand
- Competitors: 224 in 12 sports
- Flag bearer (opening): Anthony Mosse
- Flag bearer (closing): Gary Anderson
- Officials: 61
- Medals Ranked 4th: Gold 17 Silver 14 Bronze 27 Total 58

Commonwealth Games appearances (overview)
- 1930; 1934; 1938; 1950; 1954; 1958; 1962; 1966; 1970; 1974; 1978; 1982; 1986; 1990; 1994; 1998; 2002; 2006; 2010; 2014; 2018; 2022; 2026; 2030

New Zealand at the 1990 Commonwealth Games was represented by a team of 224 competitors and 61 officials. Selection of the team for the Games in Auckland, New Zealand, was the responsibility of the New Zealand Olympic and Commonwealth Games Association. New Zealand's flagbearer at the opening ceremony was swimmer Anthony Mosse, and at the closing ceremony was cyclist Gary Anderson. The New Zealand team finished fourth on the medal table, winning a total of 58 medals, 17 of which were gold.

New Zealand has competed in every games, starting with the British Empire Games in 1930 at Hamilton, Ontario.

== Medal tables ==
Medal	Name	Sport	Event
Gold	Tania Dixon	Athletics	Women's high jump
Gold	Michael Kenny	Boxing	Men's super heavyweight
Gold	Gary Anderson	Cycling – track	Men's individual pursuit
Gold	Gary Anderson	Cycling – track	Men's scratch race
Gold	Gary Anderson; Nigel Donnelly; Glen McLeay; Stuart Williams	Cycling – track	Men's team pursuit
Gold	Brian Fowler; Graeme Miller; Ian Richards; Gavin Stevens	Cycling – road	Men's team time trial
Gold	Madonna Harris	Cycling – track	Women's individual pursuit
Gold	Graeme Miller	Cycling – road	Men's road race
Gold	Nikki Jenkins	Gymnastics	Women's vault
Gold	Angela Walker	Gymnastics	Women's rope
Gold	Brent Cooper	Judo	Men's half lightweight
Gold	Judy Howat; Marie Watson	Lawn bowls	Women's pairs
Gold	Paul Carmine; Tony Clarke	Shooting	Open 10 m running target pairs
Gold	Roger Harvey	Shooting	Open 50 m rifle prone
Gold	Roger Harvey; Stephen Petterson	Shooting	Open 50 m rifle prone pairs
Gold	Anthony Mosse	Swimming	Men's 200 m butterfly
Gold	Anna Simcic	Swimming	Women's 200 m backstroke
Silver	Anne Judkins	Athletics	Women's 10 km walk
Silver	Simon Poelman	Athletics	Men's decathlon
Silver	Gary Anderson	Cycling – track	Men's 1 km time trial
Silver	Craig Connell	Cycling – track	Men's points race
Silver	Brian Fowler	Cycling – road	Men's road race
Silver	Donna Guy-Halkyard	Judo	Women's half middleweight
Silver	Graeme Spinks	Judo	Men's half middleweight
Silver	Marlene Castle; Adrienne Lambert; Lyn McLean; Rhoda Ryan	Lawn bowls	Women's fours
Silver	Millie Khan	Lawn bowls	Women's singles
Silver	Barry O'Neale; Greg Yelavich	Shooting	Open centre-fire pistol pairs
Silver	Stephen Petterson	Shooting	Open 50 m rifle prone
Silver	Brian Read; Greg Yelavich	Shooting	Open free pistol pairs
Silver	Paul Kingsman	Swimming	Men's 200 m backstroke
Silver	Anna Simcic	Swimming	Women's 100 m backstroke
Bronze	Angus Cooper	Athletics	Men's hammer throw
Bronze	Gavin Lovegrove	Athletics	Men's javelin throw
Bronze	Barbara Moore	Athletics	Women's 10,000 m
Bronze	Peter O'Donoghue	Athletics	Men's 1500 m
Bronze	Tracy Phillips	Athletics	Women's high jump
Bronze	Simon Poelman	Athletics	Men's pole vault
Bronze	Nigel Anderson	Boxing	Men's light heavyweight
Bronze	Andy Creery	Boxing	Men's light middleweight
Bronze	Jon Andrews	Cycling – track	Men's 1 km time trial
Bronze	Jon Andrews	Cycling – track	Men's sprint
Bronze	Sue Golder	Cycling – track	Women's sprint
Bronze	Nicky Cooney	Diving	Women's 3 m springboard
Bronze	Raewyn Jack	Gymnastics	Women's hoop
Bronze	Raewyn Jack	Gymnastics	Women's ribbon
Bronze	Angela Walker	Gymnastics	Women's all-around
Bronze	Angela Walker	Gymnastics	Women's ball
Bronze	Angela Walker	Gymnastics	Women's ribbon
Bronze	Nicola Morris	Judo	Women's heavyweight
Bronze	Wayne Watson	Judo	Men's heavyweight
Bronze	Rowan Brassey; Maurice Symes	Lawn bowls	Men's pairs
Bronze	Kevin Darling; Stewart McConnell; Peter Shaw; Phil Skoglund	Lawn bowls	Men's fours
Bronze	Tony Clarke	Shooting	Open 10 m running target
Bronze	Tim Dodds; John Woolley	Shooting	Open skeet pairs
Bronze	Julian Lawton; Greg Yelavich	Shooting	Open 10 m air pistol pairs
Bronze	Paul Kingsman	Swimming	Men's 100 m backstroke
Bronze	Ross Anderson; Anthony Mosse; John Steel; Richard Tapper	Swimming	Men's 4 × 200 m freestyle relay
Bronze	Michelle Burke; Sharon Hanley; Phillippa Langrell; Linda Robinson	Swimming	Women's 4 × 200 m freestyle relay

Triathlon was a demonstration event, and was won by Erin Baker (women) and Rick Wells (men), both from New Zealand.

Medals by sport
Sport	Gold medal	Silver medal	Bronze medal	Total
Cycling	6	3	3	12
Shooting	3	3	3	9
Swimming	2	2	3	7
Gymnastics	2	0	5	7
Judo	1	2	2	5
Lawn bowls	1	2	2	5
Athletics	1	2	6	9
Boxing	1	0	2	3
Diving	0	0	1	1
Total	17	14	27	58

Medals by gender
Gender	Gold medal	Silver medal	Bronze medal	Total
Male	8	6	13	27
Female	6	5	11	22
Mixed / open	3	3	3	9
Total	17	14	27	58

== Competitors ==
The following table lists the number of New Zealand competitors who participated at the Games according to gender and sport.

Sport	Men	Women	Total
Athletics	49	36	85
Badminton	5	5	10
Boxing	8	—N/a	8
Cycling	16	6	22
Diving	1	3	4
Gymnastics	4	7	11
Judo	5	6	11
Lawn bowls	7	7	14
Shooting	17	1	18
Swimming	19	13	32
Synchronised swimming	—N/a	2	2
Weightlifting	7	—N/a	7
Total	138	86	224

== Athletics ==
=== Combined ===
Men's decathlon

Athlete	100 m	Long jump	Shot put	High jump	400 m	110 m hurdles	Discus throw	Pole vault	Javelin throw	1500 m	Overall points	Rank
Peter Henry	11.28	7.05 m	12.95 m	1.93 m	51.38	15.29	39.40 m	4.00 m	51.26 m	4:53.30	7071 pts	10
Terry Lomax	11.50	6.81 m	11.36 m	2.05 m	51.76	15.17	38.62 m	4.00 m	47.32 m	4:45.24	6955 pts	11
Simon Poelman	10.97	7.62 m	15.64 m	2.05 m	51.13	14:45	44.72 m	4.60 m	57.36 m	4:26.59	8207 pts	2nd place, silver medalist(s)

Women's heptathlon

Athlete	100 m hurdles	Shot put	High jump	200 m	Long jump	Javelin throw	800 m	Overall points	Rank
Joanne Henry	14.53	11.04 m	1.76 m	25.10	6.20 m	37.40 m	2:12.64	5764 pts	5
Cassandra Kelly	13.99	10.86 m	1.67 m	25.29	5.71 m	24.88 m	2:17.45	5244 pts	9
Lyn Osmers	15.37	10.98 m	1.73 m	26.43	5.85 m	39.90 m	2:28.25	5222 pts	10

== Boxing ==
Athlete	Event	Round of 32	Round of 16	Quarterfinal	Semifinal	Final	Rank
Athlete	Event	Opposition Result	Opposition Result	Opposition Result	Opposition Result	Opposition Result	Rank
Danny Masterson	Bantamweight	—N/a	Bie (CAN); L	Did not advance			
Dave Wickenden	Lightweight	—N/a	Nyakana (UGA); L	Did not advance			
Nuka Wood	Light welterweight	Smyth (WAL); L	Did not advance				
Danny Morris	Welterweight	Bye	Ankamah (GHA); L	Did not advance			
Andy Creery	Light middleweight	—N/a	Dewang (IND); W	Penniston (TRI); W	Downey (CAN); L	Did not advance	3rd place, bronze medalist(s)
Michael Bell	Middleweight	—N/a	Makalamba (MAW); W	Edwards (ENG); L	Did not advance		
Nigel Anderson	Light heavyweight	—N/a	Caulfield (SCO); W	Wright (ENG); W	Brown (CAN); L	Did not advance	3rd place, bronze medalist(s)
Michael Kenny	Super heavyweight	—N/a	Bye	McCormack (WAL); W	Linklater (CAN); W	Al-Hassan (GHA); W	1st place, gold medalist(s)

== Cycling ==
=== Road ===
Athlete	Event	Time	Rank
Brian Fowler	Men's road race	4:34:00.39	2nd place, silver medalist(s)
Sally Fraser	Women's road race	1:55:16.34	11
Madonna Harris	Women's road race	1:55:12.23	4
Stewart Imrie	Men's road race	DNF	
Kathy Lynch	Women's road race	1:55:14.25	9
Sue Matthews	Women's road race	2:01:42.22	13
Graeme Miller	Men's road race	4:34:00.19	1st place, gold medalist(s)
Ian Richards	Men's road race	4:36:23.41	16
Brian Fowler; Graeme Miller; Ian Richards; Gavin Stevens	Men's team time trial	2:06:46.55	1st place, gold medalist(s)

== Diving ==
Athlete	Event	Points	Rank
Nicky Cooney	Women's 1 m springboard	388.14	8
Nicky Cooney	Women's 3 m springboard	457.29	3rd place, bronze medalist(s)
Ginine Flynn	Women's 10 m platform	314.34	7
Tania Paterson	Women's 3 m springboard	369.06	11
Tania Paterson	Women's 10 m platform	329.16	6
Tony Young	Men's 1 m springboard	424.11	11
Tony Young	Men's 3 m springboard	389.31	13

== Swimming ==
Athlete	Event	Heat		Final	
Athlete	Event	Result	Rank	Result	Rank
Ross Anderson	Men's 100 m butterfly	55.77	6 Q	55.58	7
Ross Anderson	Men's 200 m butterfly	2:01.93	5 Q	2:01.83	7
Ross Anderson	Men's 200 m freestyle	1:52.82	9	Did not advance	
Danielle Bates	Women's 100 m breaststroke	1:14.37	10	Did not advance	
Danielle Bates	Women's 200 m breaststroke	2:41.04	11	Did not advance	
Tim Bowen	Men's 200 m backstroke	2:08.76	12	Did not advance	
Michelle Burke	Women's 100 m butterfly	1:05.43	14	Did not advance	
Michelle Burke	Women's 50 m freestyle	27.12	11	Did not advance	
Michelle Burke	Women's 100 m freestyle	58.90	23	Did not advance	
Michelle Burke	Women's 200 m freestyle	2:05.97	11	Did not advance	
Peter Doig	Men's 100 m backstroke	2:06.35	7 Q	2:08.33	8
Grant Forbes	Men's 100 m breaststroke	1:05.89	12	Did not advance	
Grant Forbes	Men's 200 m breaststroke	2:23.53	11	Did not advance	
Craig Ford	Men's 400 m individual medley	4:33.02	13	Did not advance	
Brent Foster	Men's 200 m individual medley	2:10.66	15	Did not advance	
Brent Foster	Men's 400 m individual medley	4:36.31	17	Did not advance	
Sharon Hanley	Women's 200 m butterfly	2:19.61	10	Did not advance	
Sharon Hanley	Women's 100 m freestyle	59.02	24	Did not advance	
Sharon Hanley	Women's 200 m freestyle	2:08.06	14	Did not advance	
Toni Jeffs	Women's 50 m freestyle	26.78	7 Q	26.68	8
Toni Jeffs	Women's 100 m freestyle	58.39	7 Q	57.82	5
Paul Kingsman	Men's 100 m backstroke	56.98	2 Q	57.07	3rd place, bronze medalist(s)
Paul Kingsman	Men's 200 m backstroke	2:03.06	1 Q	2:01.86	2nd place, silver medalist(s)
Phillippa Langrell	Women's 200 m butterfly	2:19.39	9	Did not advance	
Phillippa Langrell	Women's 400 m freestyle	4:18.83	5 Q	4:15.64	4
Phillippa Langrell	Women's 800 m freestyle	8:47.90	4 Q	8:37.80	4
Danyon Loader	Men's 400 m freestyle	4:05.90	14	Did not advance	
Danyon Loader	Men's 1500 m freestyle	15:50.01	12	Did not advance	
Richard Lockhart	Men's 100 m breaststroke	1:05.05	10	Did not advance	
Richard Lockhart	Men's 200 m breaststroke	2:23.46	10	Did not advance	
Meg Luff	Women's 50 m freestyle	27.97	17	Did not advance	
Bryce Milsom	Men's 100 m breaststroke	1:07.44	14	Did not advance	
Bryce Milsom	Men's 200 m breaststroke	2:28.93	14	Did not advance	
Anthony Mosse	Men's 100 m butterfly	55.13	4 Q	54.60	4
Anthony Mosse	Men's 200 m butterfly	2:00.62	1 Q	1:57.33	1st place, gold medalist(s)
John Munro	Men's 200 m butterfly	2:04.51	11	Did not advance	
John Munro	Men's 200 m individual medley	2:07.39	12	Did not advance	
John Munro	Men's 400 m individual medley	4:27.29	3 Q	4:25.49	6
Sharon Musson	Women's 100 m backstroke	1:05.60	8 Q	1:05.26	8
Sharon Musson	Women's 200 m backstroke	2:18.96	7 Q	2:19.09	8
Simon Percy	Men's 100 m backstroke	58.39	7 Q	57.89	5
Byron Reid	Men's 100 m freestyle	52.64	13	Did not advance	
Linda Robinson	Women's 400 m freestyle	4:20.56	5 Q	4:18.69	5
Linda Robinson	Women's 200 m individual medley	2:23.09	9	Did not advance	
Linda Robinson	Women's 400 m individual medley	4:55.02	7 Q	4:52.66	7
Monique Rodahl	Women's 100 m backstroke	1:06.18	10	Did not advance	
Monique Rodahl	Women's 200 m backstroke	2:21.42	12	Did not advance	
Monique Rodahl	Women's 100 m butterfly	1:04.73	11	Did not advance	
Monique Rodahl	Women's 200 m individual medley	2:23.49	11	Did not advance	
Fiona Ross	Women's 100 m breaststroke	1:16.05	14	Did not advance	
Fiona Ross	Women's 200 m breaststroke	2:41.08	12	Did not advance	
Michaela Ross	Women's 100 m breaststroke	1:15.14	11	Did not advance	
Michaela Ross	Women's 200 m breaststroke	2:38.02	8 Q	2:38.05	8
Michaela Ross	Women's 400 m individual medley	4:57.39	8 Q	4:57.03	8
Nick Sanders	Men's 50 m freestyle	23.58	6 Q	23.41	6
Nick Sanders	Men's 200 m individual medley	2:07.33	10	Did not advance	
Anna Simcic	Women's 100 m backstroke	1:03.89	2 Q	1:02.55	2nd place, silver medalist(s)
Anna Simcic	Women's 200 m backstroke	2:15.88	1 Q	2:12.32	1st place, gold medalist(s)
Anna Simcic	Women's 100 m butterfly	1:04.08	9	Did not advance	
John Steel	Men's 100 m butterfly	55.94	8 Q	55.42	6
John Steel	Men's 50 m freestyle	24.15	13	Did not advance	
John Steel	Men's 100 m freestyle	51.68	6 Q	51.17	5
John Steel	Men's 200 m freestyle	1:52.61	8 Q	1:53.20	8
Richard Tapper	Men's 200 m freestyle	1:53.16	11	Did not advance	
Richard Tapper	Men's 400 m freestyle	3:58.12	8 Q	4:01.11	8
Kirk Torrance	Men's 100 m backstroke	59.38	16	Did not advance	
Mark Weldon	Men's 50 m freestyle	24.23	15	Did not advance	
Mark Weldon	Men's 100 m freestyle	52.46	12	Did not advance	
Nichola West	Women's 200 m butterfly	2:18.00	8 Q	2:17.93	8
Nichola West	Women's 200 m individual medley	2:22.60	8 Q	2:22.73	8
Nichola West	Women's 400 m individual medley	4:58.58	10	Did not advance	
Byron Reid; John Steel; Mark Weldon; Nick Sanders	Men's 4 × 100 m freestyle relay	—N/a		3:25.55	4
Richard Tapper; John Steel; Anthony Mosse; Ross Anderson	Men's 4 × 200 m freestyle relay	—N/a		7:30.10	3rd place, bronze medalist(s)
Anthony Mosse; John Steel; Paul Kingsman; Richard Lockhart	Men's 4 × 100 m medley relay	—N/a		3:45.30	4
Toni Jeffs; Michelle Burke; Meg Luff; Sharon Hanley	Women's 4 × 100 m freestyle relay	—N/a		3:52.70	4
Linda Robinson; Michelle Burke; Phillippa Langrell; Sharon Hanley	Women's 4 × 200 m freestyle relay	—N/a		8:22.60	3rd place, bronze medalist(s)
Anna Simcic; Danielle Bates; Monique Rodahl; Toni Jeffs	Women's 4 × 100 m medley relay	—N/a		4:20.35	4

== Synchronised swimming ==
Athlete	Event	Points	Rank
Mandy Zukerman	Women's solo	157.030	4
Lizzie Burslem; Mandy Zukerman	Women's duet	156.945	4

== Weightlifting ==
Athlete	Event	Snatch	Clean and jerk	Total	Rank
Phillip Chappell	Bantamweight	122.5 kg	92.5 kg	215.0 kg	6
Shane Judson	Bantamweight	112.5 kg	90.0 kg	202.5 kg	7
Thomas McIntyre	Lightweight	145.0 kg	112.5 kg	257.5 kg	8
Lester Keene	Lightweight	135.0 kg	112.5 kg	247.5 kg	9
Michael Foo Chong	Light heavyweight	160.0 kg	122.5 kg	282.5	8
Allister Nalder	Light heavyweight	167.5 kg	140.0 kg	307.5 kg	6
Kevin Blake	Middle heavyweight	175.0 kg	140.0 kg	315.0 kg	5

== Officials ==
- Team manager – Graeme McCabe
- Deputy team manager – Tony Popplewell
- Assistant team manager – Merle Jonson
- Administration – Cathryn Kerr, Catherine McLauchlan, Graeme Steel
- Director of medical services – Richard Edmond
- Team doctors – Tony Edwards, Chris Milne, Wayne Morris
- Chief physiotherapist – Ian Sim
- Physiotherapists – Jane Bradshaw, Marion Thogersen, Chris McCullough, Duncan Reid
- Masseurs – Shirley Calvert, Bruce Towart
- Athletics
  - Section manager – Sylvia Potts
  - Administration assistant – Karen Petley
  - Chief coach – Kerry Hill
  - Relay coach – Jeff Bailey
  - Sprint coach – John Hunt
  - Distance coaches – Bruce Milne, Arthur Lydiard
  - Jumps coach – Doug McClymount
  - Throws coach – Mene Mane
- Badminton
  - Section manager – Chris Bullen
  - Coach – Martin Andersen
- Bowls
  - Section managers – Stan Sear, Joyce Osborne
  - Men's coach – John Murtagh
- Boxing
  - Section manager – Nuki Johnson
  - Coaches – Peter Bell, John McKay
- Cycling
  - Section manager – Gordon Sharrock
  - Road coach – Garry Bell
  - Track coach – Ron Cheatley
  - Assistant track coach – Wayne Thorpe
  - Mechanics – Peter Goding, Jim Matthews
- Gymnastics
  - Section manager – Warwick Darcey
  - Women's artistic coach – Lyn Johnstone
  - Men's artistic coach – Mike Ranger
  - Rhythmic coach – Lesley King
- Judo
  - Section manager – Ray Roberts
  - Women's coach – Ben Griffiths
  - Men's coach – James McPhee
- Shooting
  - Section manager – Graeme Smith
  - Assistant managers – David Steely, Rodney Derrett, John Hastie, John Sherring, John Wilkey
- Swimming
  - Section manager – Bert Cotterill
  - Chief coach – Hilton Brown
  - Head coaches – Brett Naylor, Pic Parkhouse
  - Diving coach – Merv Campbell
  - Synchronised swimming coach – Lynette Sadleir
- Weightlifting
  - Section manager – Garry Marshall
  - Coach – Phillip Sue

== See also ==
- New Zealand Olympic Committee
- New Zealand at the Commonwealth Games
- New Zealand at the 1988 Summer Olympics
- New Zealand at the 1992 Summer Olympics
