= 1991 Pan Pacific Swimming Championships – Men's 50 metre freestyle =

Men's 50 metre freestyle at the 1991 Pan Pacific Swimming Championships
- Venue: Kinsmen Sports Center
- Dates: August 25, 1991 (heats & finals)
- Competitors: 28 from 9 nations
- Winning time: 22.21

Medalists
gold medal	Tom Jager	United States
silver medal	Matt Biondi	United States
bronze medal	Darren Lange	Australia

The men's 50 metre freestyle competition at the 1991 Pan Pacific Swimming Championships took place on August 25 at the Kinsmen Sports Center. The last champion was Tom Jager of US.

This race consisted of one length of the pool in freestyle.

== Records ==
Prior to this competition, the existing world and Pan Pacific records were as follows:

World record	Tom Jager (USA)	21.81	Nashville, United States	March 24, 1990
Pan Pacific Championships record	Tom Jager (USA)	22.12	Tokyo, Japan	August 20, 1989

== Results ==
All times are in minutes and seconds.

KEY:	q	Fastest non-qualifiers	Q	Qualified	CR	Championships record	NR	National record	PB	Personal best	SB	Seasonal best

=== Heats ===
The first round was held on August 25.

Rank	Name	Nationality	Time	Notes
1	Matt Biondi	United States	22.14	QA
2	Tom Jager	United States	22.31	QA
3	Steve Crocker	United States	22.32	QA
4	Darren Lange	Australia	22.93	QA
5	Jon Olsen	United States	22.99	QA
6	Shaun Jordan	United States	23.07	QA
7	Dean Kondziolka	Canada	23.13	QA
8	Chris Fydler	Australia	23.25	QA
8	Andrew Baildon	Australia	23.25	QA
10	Troy Dalbey	United States	23.48	QB
11	Robert Abernethy	Australia	23.52	QB
12	Matthew Renshaw	Australia	23.55	QB
13	Nick Sanders	New Zealand	23.56	QB
14	Mark Henderson	United States	23.59	QB
15	Joe Hudepohl	United States	23.74	QB
16	Qiu Jieming	China	23.79	QB
17	Jeff Thibault	United States	23.85	
18	John Steel	New Zealand	23.98	
19	Michael Wright	Hong Kong	23.99	
19	Robert Braknis	Canada	23.99	
21	Mark Weldon	New Zealand	24.04	
22	Arthur Li	Hong Kong	24.07	
23	Tsutomu Nakano	Japan	24.09	
24	Masakatsu Usami	Japan	24.14	
25	Sebastien Goulet	Canada	24.21	
26	Toby Haenen	Australia	24.47	
27	Richard Bera	Indonesia	24.62	
28	Yi-Chung Chen	Chinese Taipei	24.68	

=== B Final ===
The B final was held on August 25.

Rank	Name	Nationality	Time	Notes
9	Steve Crocker	United States	22.40	
10	Chris Fydler	Australia	23.24	
11	Michael Wright	Hong Kong	23.75	
12	Robert Braknis	Canada	23.89	
13	Arthur Li	Hong Kong	23.97	
14	Tsutomu Nakano	Japan	24.11	
15	Masakatsu Usami	Japan	24.17	
16	Mark Weldon	New Zealand	24.27	

=== A Final ===
The A final was held on August 25.

Rank	Lane	Nationality	Time	Notes
1st place, gold medalist(s)	Tom Jager	United States	22.21	
2nd place, silver medalist(s)	Matt Biondi	United States	22.30	
3rd place, bronze medalist(s)	Darren Lange	Australia	23.00	
4	Andrew Baildon	Australia	23.11	
4	Dean Kondziolka	Canada	23.11	
6	Nick Sanders	New Zealand	23.45	
7	Qiu Jieming	China	23.70	
8	John Steel	New Zealand	23.73	
