= Neil Metcalfe =

British swimmer

Personal information
- Full name: Neil Metcalfe
- Nationality: English

Sport
- Club: City of Leeds
- Now coaching: HJFC
Medal record
Swimming
Representing England
Commonwealth Games
| Silver medal – second place | 1990 Auckland | freestyle relay |

Neil Metcalfe from Leeds is a former international standard competitive swimmer. Metcalfe is a silver medalist from the 1990 Commonwealth Games in Auckland. He remains one of only a handful of UK swimmers to complete the 50-metre-long course in under 23 seconds.

== Swimming career ==
Coached by Terry Denison MBE at home town club, City of Leeds, the highest distinction of Metcalfe's career was when represented England at the 1990 Commonwealth Games in Auckland and gained a silver medal in the 4 × 100 m freestyle relay. His teammates were Austyn Shortman, Mike Fibbens, Mark Foster & City of Leeds Swim Club mate Steve Dronsfield. Metcalfe also swam at the European Long course championship at Ponds Forge pool in Sheffield in 1993.

Metcalfe missed out on a place for the 1992 Summer Olympics in Barcelona in circumstances of some controversy. Metcalfe achieved the qualification time and came second in the UK Olympic trials behind Foster. However Metcalfe missed out due to Fibbens having been pre-selected for winning a bronze from Swimming at the 1991 European Aquatics Championships. The subject was later raised again by James Parrack in his April 2004 column in Swimming magazine.

At national level Metcalfe was the 50 metre freestyle short course champion in 1993 to add to being national champion in numerous relay events.

Metcalfe returned to swimming at Masters level in 2013 breaking the British short course 4 x 50 metre freestyle record.

== Life outside swimming ==
Neil Metcalfe works in IT Incident Management. He and his partner have two children. Metcalfe plays golf and is a fan of Leeds United.

== See also ==
- List of Commonwealth Games medallists in swimming (men)
