= Synchronised swimming at the 1990 Commonwealth Games =

- Venue: West Auckland Swimming Centre
- Location: Auckland, New Zealand
- Dates: 24 January – 3 February 1990

Synchronised swimming at the 1990 Commonwealth Games was the second appearance of Synchronised swimming at the Commonwealth Games. Competition featured three events, held in Auckland, New Zealand, from 24 January to 3 February 1990.

The events were held at the West Auckland Swimming Centre on Alderman Drive in Henderson. The venue had been specifically built for the Games but faced late issues relating to the 3,200 grandstand seating. It was however described as technologically advanced with a variable floor and movable bulkhead.

Canada topped the medal table with all three gold medals.

== Medal table ==
* Host nation (New Zealand)

Rank	Nation	Gold	Silver	Bronze	Total
1	Canada	3	1	1	5
2	England	0	2	0	2
3	Australia	0	0	2	2
Totals (3 entries)		3	3	3	9

== Medallists ==
Event	Gold		Silver		Bronze	
Solo	Sylvie Fréchette; Canada	196.68	Kerry Shacklock; England	184.79	Semon Elke Rohloff; Australia	173.320
Duet	Canada; Kathy Glen; Christine Larsen	191.23	England; Sarah Northey; Kerry Shacklock	185.435	Australia; Lisa Barbara Lieschke; Semon Elke Rohloff	175.765
Figures	Sylvie Fréchette; Canada	99.16	Kathy Glen; Canada	94.74	Christine Larsen; Canada	94.52
