= Brad Simpson =

Brad Simpson may refer to:

- Brad Simpson (racewalker), Australian athlete, silver 5000 metres walk medallist at the 2010 Oceania Youth Athletics Championships
- Brad Simpson (producer) (born 1973), American filmmaker and executive producer
- Brad Simpson (journalist), American journalist, joint winner of the Investigative Reporters and Editors Award for syndicated TV News in 2008
- Brad Simpson (singer) (born 1995), English singer, lead vocalist for The Vamps
- Brad Simpson (swimmer), Australian swimmer, bronze 100 m breaststroke medallist at the 1987 Australian Swimming Championships
