= Parrack =

Parrack is a surname. Notable persons with that name include:

- Doyle Parrack (1921–2008), American basketball player and coach
- James Parrack (born 1967), English sports journalist and former swimmer
- Jim Parrack (born 1981), American actor
- Martin Parrack (born 1955), English vehicle weighing and transport consultant
- Timothy Parrack (born 1977),

Independent Claims Adjuster
