= Gary Anderson (swimmer) =

Canadian swimmer (born 1969)

Personal information
- Full name: Gary Myers Anderson
- National team: Canada
- Born: April 7, 1969 (age 57) Montreal, Quebec
- Height: 1.93 m (6 ft 4 in)
- Weight: 88 kg (194 lb)

Sport
- Sport: Swimming
- Strokes: Backstroke, medley
- Club: North York Aquatic Club
Medal record
Men's swimming
Representing Canada
Pan Pacific Championships
Gold medal – first place	1991 Edmonton	200 m medley
Silver medal – second place	1989 Tokyo	200 m backstroke
Bronze medal – third place	1989 Tokyo	200 m medley
Commonwealth Games
Gold medal – first place	1990 Auckland	200 m backstroke
Gold medal – first place	1990 Auckland	200 m medley
Silver medal – second place	1990 Auckland	100 m backstroke

Gary Myers Anderson (born April 7, 1969) is a former competition medley and backstroke swimmer from Canada, who competed for his native country at the 1988 Summer Olympics in Seoul, South Korea.

At Seoul, Anderson finished in 8th position in the 200-metre individual medley. Four years later at the 1992 Summer Olympics in Barcelona, Anderson claimed the same spot in the same event.

Anderson was the head coach for the California Aquatics swim team in Pasadena, Santa Clarita, and South Pasadena, California.

== See also ==
- List of Commonwealth Games medallists in swimming (men)
