= Christopher Bowie =

Canadian swimmer

Personal information
- Full name: Christopher Robert Bowie
- National team: Canada
- Born: November 21, 1966 (age 59) Prince George, British Columbia, Canada
- Height: 1.77 m (5 ft 10 in)
- Weight: 72 kg (159 lb)

Sport
- Sport: Swimming
- Strokes: Freestyle
- Club: Edmonton Keyano Swim Club
Medal record
Men's swimming
Representing Canada
Pan Pacific Games
Bronze medal – third place	1989 Tokyo	800 m freestyle
Commonwealth Games
Bronze medal – third place	1990 Auckland	400 m freestyle
Summer Universiade
Bronze medal – third place	1991 Sheffield	1500 m freestyle

Christopher Robert Bowie (born November 21, 1966) is a former freestyle swimmer, who competed for Canada at the 1992 Summer Olympics in Barcelona, Spain. There he finished in 15th position in the men's 1500-metre freestyle, and in ninth place with the men's 4x200-metre freestyle relay team.
