= Kevin Draxinger =

Canadian swimmer (born 1967)

Personal information
- Full name: Kevin Draxinger
- National team: Canada
- Born: March 16, 1967 (age 59) Vancouver, British Columbia
- Height: 1.90 m (6 ft 3 in)
- Weight: 85 kg (187 lb)

Sport
- Sport: Swimming
- Strokes: Backstroke
- Club: Pacific Dolphins
- College team: University of British Columbia
Medal record
Men's swimming
Representing Canada
Pan Pacific Championships
Silver medal – second place	1991 Edmonton	200 m backstroke
Bronze medal – third place	1987 Brisbane	200 m backstroke
Commonwealth Games
Silver medal – second place	1994 Victoria	200 m backstroke
Bronze medal – third place	1990 Auckland	200 m backstroke
Universiade
Silver medal – second place	1991 Sheffield	200 m backstroke

Kevin Draxinger (born March 16, 1967) is a former backstroke swimmer from Canada, who competed for his native country at the 1992 Summer Olympics in Barcelona, Spain. There he finished in the twelfth position in the 200-metre backstroke. In the same event he won the silver medal at the 1994 Commonwealth Games.

At the 1991 Summer Universiade, Draxinger won a silver medal in the 200-metre backstroke.

He obtained an MD degree from the University of British Columbia (Vancouver, Canada) in 1998, and further specialized himself in Orthopedic and spinal surgery at McGill University (Montreal, Canada) and Johns Hopkins University (Baltimore). Draxinger now serves a Sports medicine and Orthopedic surgery Physician in Freeport, Illinois, working for the Freeport Health Network at their Burchard Hills offices.

== See also ==
- List of Commonwealth Games medallists in swimming (men)
