= Angela Mullens =

Australian swimmer (born 1968)

Personal information
- Full name: Angela Marie Walker
- National team: Australia
- Born: Angela Marie Mullens; 16 December 1968 (age 57) Moree, New South Wales, Australia

Sport
- Sport: Swimming
- Strokes: Freestyle
Medal record
Women's swimming
Representing Australia
Commonwealth Games
Gold medal – first place	1990 Auckland	4×100 m freestyle

Angela Marie Mullens (born 16 December 1968) is an Australian former freestyle swimmer of the 1990s, who competed in the 1992 Summer Olympics in Barcelona, Spain.

Mullens, who was from Moree, competed in the Women's 4 × 100 metre freestyle relay. The Australian team finished ninth and, therefore, did not make the final.

Two years earlier Mullens had been a member of the women's 4 x 100 metre freestyle relay team who won gold at the 1990 Commonwealth Games in Auckland.
