= Athletics at the 1990 Commonwealth Games – Women's heptathlon =

Women's heptathlon at the Commonwealth Games

The women's heptathlon event at the 1990 Commonwealth Games was held on 27 and 28 January at the Mount Smart Stadium in Auckland.

Jane Flemming's winning margin was 580 points which as of 2024 remains the only time the heptathlon was won by more than 330 points at these games. She won four of the seven events and came second in the other three.

== Results ==
The highest mark recorded in each event is highlighted in yellow

Rank	Athlete	Nationality	100m H	HJ	SP	200m	LJ	JT	800m	Points	Notes
1st place, gold medalist(s)	Jane Flemming	Australia	13.21	1.82	13.76	23.62	6.57	49.28	2:12.53	6695	
2nd place, silver medalist(s)	Sharon Jaklofsky-Smith	Australia	13.54	1.76	13.16	24.58	6.42	39.94	2:19.34	6115	
3rd place, bronze medalist(s)	Judy Simpson	England	13.39	1.73	14.89	25.29	6.03	39.42	2:14.59	6085	
4	Joanne Mulliner	England	14.00	1.76	13.38	24.85	6.02	36.25	2:12.10	5913	
5	Joanne Henry	New Zealand	14.53	1.76	11.04	25.10	6.20	37.40	2:12.64	5764	
6	Jocelyn Millar-Cubit	Australia	13.97	1.73	10.94	24.52	6.24	34.04	2:15.30	5762	
7	Catherine Bond	Canada	14.33	1.79	11.86	24.77	6.01	33.10	2:13.49	5760	
8	Donna Smellie	Canada	14.02	1.70	13.15	25.23	5.69	43.54	2:32.76	5584	
9	Cassandra Kelly	New Zealand	13.99	1.67	10.66	25.29	5.71	24.88	2:17.45	5244	
10	Lyn Osmers	New Zealand	15.37	1.73	10.98	26.43	5.85	39.90	2:28.25	5222	
11	Iammo Launa	Papua New Guinea	15.45	1.46	12.25	25.74	5.22	49.30	2:45.80	4833	
12	Marie Lourdes Allysamba	Mauritius	15.89	1.52	11.44	26.48	5.61	34.98	2:30.65	4740	
	Shona Urquhart	Scotland	14.94	1.64	11.12	26.30	5.33	40.32	DNS	DNF	
	Kim Hagger	England	13.61	1.73	11.59	DNS	–	–	–	DNF	
