= Joanna Coull =

British swimmer (born 1973)

Personal information
- Born: 4 February 1973 (age 53) Banbury, Oxfordshire

Sport
- Sport: Swimming
Medal record
Swimming
Representing England
Commonwealth Games
Silver medal – second place	1990 Auckland	freestyle relay

Joanna Coull (born 4 February 1973) is a retired British international swimmer. Coull competed in two events at the 1988 Summer Olympics. She represented England in the 200 metres and 400 metres freestyle and won a silver medal in the 4 x 200 metres freestyle relay, at the 1990 Commonwealth Games in Auckland, New Zealand. She also won the 1989 ASA National Championship title in the 200 metres freestyle.
