= Madonna Harris =

New Zealand sportswoman (born 1956)

Madonna Harris MBE
Personal information
- Born: Madonna Mary Gilchrist; 15 August 1956 (age 69) Hamilton, New Zealand

Sport
- Country: New Zealand
- Sport: Cross-country skiing Cycling
Medal record
Representing New Zealand
Women's track cycling
Commonwealth Games
Gold medal – first place	1990 Auckland	Individual pursuit
World Championships
Silver medal – second place	1990 Maebashi	Individual pursuit

Madonna Mary Harris MBE (née Gilchrist, born 15 August 1956) is a New Zealand multi-sportswoman who has competed for New Zealand at both the Summer and Winter Olympics. The only other New Zealander to compete at both Olympics is Chris Nicholson.

At the 1988 Winter Olympics at Calgary she came 40th in the 20 km free technique cross-country skiing event.

She did not finish in the cycling road race at the 1988 Summer Olympics, but in the race she pushed the pace until she had to withdraw with a puncture late in the race.

At the 1990 Commonwealth Games in Auckland, Harris won a gold medal in the 3000m individual pursuit, and came fourth in the 72 km road race. She was appointed a Member of the Order of the British Empire in the 1990 Queen's Birthday Honours, for services to cycling.

Born in Hamilton, Harris was the Waikato pentathlon champion and represented New Zealand in athletics (400m hurdles) in 1977 and basketball in 1977–78. In 1978 she went on an athletics and basketball scholarship to Utah State University. She took up cross-country skiing and became a professional ski instructor. Then at 28 she slipped on ice while running, and only being able to ride for several weeks took up cycling. She decided to retire in 1992 before the Barcelona Olympics because of health problems, moved to a hobby farm south of Auckland, and took up the emerging sport of endurance horse racing.

== Notes ==
- New Zealand’s Top 100 Sports History-Makers by Joseph Romanos p. 212 (2006 Trio Books, Wellington) ISBN 0-9582455-8-4
- Black Gold by Ron Palenski p. 44,105 (2008, 2004 New Zealand Sports Hall of Fame, Dunedin) ISBN 047600683X
