= Steven Vandermeulen =

Canadian swimmer (born 1968)

Personal information
- Born: 28 December 1968 (age 57) Dawson Creek, British Columbia, Canada

Sport
- Sport: Swimming
Medal record
Representing Canada
Commonwealth Games
Bronze medal – third place	1990 Auckland	4x100m freestyle relay
Pan American Games
Silver medal – second place	1991 Havana	4x100m freestyle relay

Steven Vandermeulen (born 28 December 1968) is a Canadian former swimmer. He competed in the men's 4 × 100 metre freestyle relay at the 1988 Summer Olympics; the team placed 9th.
