= Jon Kelly (swimmer) =

Canadian swimmer (born 1965)

Personal information
- Full name: Jon Clifford Kelly
- National team: Canada
- Born: November 21, 1965 (age 60) Maria, Quebec, Canada
- Height: 1.78 m (5 ft 10 in)
- Weight: 73 kg (161 lb)

Sport
- Sport: Swimming
- Strokes: Butterfly, freestyle, medley
- Club: Victoria Amateur Swim Club
Medal record
Men's swimming
Representing Canada
Commonwealth Games
Silver medal – second place	1990 Auckland	4x200 m freestyle
Bronze medal – third place	1990 Auckland	400 m medley
Bronze medal – third place	1990 Auckland	200 m butterfly

Jon Clifford Kelly (born November 21, 1965) is a former butterfly swimmer from Canada, who competed for his native country at the 1988 Summer Olympics in Seoul, South Korea. There he finished in 7th position in the 200-metre butterfly finals, and in twelfth place in the 400-metre individual medley. He won a silver and two bronze medals at the 1990 Commonwealth Games in Auckland, New Zealand. He was inducted into the University of Victoria Sports Hall of Fame in 2006. He was born in Maria, Quebec.

== See also ==
- List of Commonwealth Games medallists in swimming (men)
