= Judy Lancaster =

English swimmer

Personal information
- Nationality: English
- Born: 1972 (age 53–54) Cheshire

Sport
- Club: Warrington Warriors
Medal record
Swimming
Representing England
Commonwealth Games
Silver medal – second place	1990 Auckland	freestyle relay

Judith 'Judy' Lancaster (born 1972), is a female former swimmer who competed for England.

== Swimming career ==
Lancaster represented England in the 200 metres freestyle and the individual medley events and won a silver medal in the 4 x 200 metres freestyle relay, at the 1990 Commonwealth Games in Auckland, New Zealand. She swam for the Warrington Warriors.
