= Madeleine Scarborough =

English former swimmer

Personal information
- Nationality: British
- Born: 1964 (age 61–62) Portsmouth, Hampshire

Sport
- Sport: Swimming
- Strokes: Butterfly
Medal record
Representing England
Commonwealth Games
Silver medal – second place	1990 Auckland	4 x 100 metres medley relay
Bronze medal – third place	1990 Auckland	100 m butterfly

Madeleine Scarborough (born 1964), is a former swimmer who competed for Great Britain and England.

== Early life ==
She grew up in Widley, attending St Paul's R.C. Primary School, and for teacher training at Loughborough University.

== Career ==
Later she taught PE at Oaklands Catholic School in 1987, and at Purbrook Park School in 1990.

== Swimming career ==
Scarborough won four National championships, she won the 1989 and 1990 ASA National Championship in the 100 metres butterfly and the 200 metres butterfly.

She represented England and won a silver medal in the 4 x 100 metres medley relay and a bronze medal in the 100 metres butterfly event, at the 1990 Commonwealth Games in Auckland, New Zealand. She also represented Great Britain in the 1989 European Aquatics Championships.

== Personal life ==
She married Iain Campbell (swimmer) at the Sacred Heart RC church Waterlooville in September 1990.
