= Ross Anderson (swimmer) =

New Zealand swimmer (born 1968)

Personal information
- Full name: Ross Woods Anderson
- Nationality: New Zealand
- Born: 24 October 1968 (age 57) Madang, Papua New Guinea

Sport
- Sport: Swimming
- Strokes: Butterfly, freestyle
- Club: Okau Amateur Swim Club, Roskill Swim Club
- Coach: Ross Anderson Senior
Medal record
Men's swimming
Representing New Zealand
Commonwealth Games
Bronze medal – third place	1990 Auckland	4x200m Freestyle

Ross Woods Anderson (born 24 October 1968) is a former butterfly and freestyle swimmer for New Zealand. During his career he won a Commonwealth Games medal at the 1990 Commonwealth games and competed at the 1988 Olympic Games.

Anderson studied at Arizona State University.

During his career, Anderson was coached by his father Ross Anderson Senior including on a number of senior national events.

== Swimming career ==
=== 1986 Commonwealth games ===
Anderson made the New Zealand team for the 1986 Commonwealth Games held in Edinburgh, Scotland. He managed a 7th-place finish in the 100 metre butterfly and 8th in the 200 metre butterfly while he was part of the 4x100 metre medley relay that finished 4th.

=== 1986 World championships ===
Anderson was back in the pool weeks later at the 1986 World Aquatics Championships held in Madrid, Spain. He finished 15th in the 200 metre butterfly in a time of 2:03.72, 21st in the 100 metre butterfly in a time of 56.16 and 35th in the 100 metre freestyle in a time of 52.63.

=== 1988 Olympics ===
He competed for New Zealand at the 1988 Summer Olympics in Seoul, South Korea. Anderson finished 20th in the 200 metre butterfly in a time of 2:02.40, a race compatriot Anthony Mosse would claim bronze in, 25th in the 100 metre butterfly in a time of 56.31, and 36th in the 100 meter freestyle in a time of 52.33. Anderson was also part of the 4x100 metre medley relay that finished 11th alongside Mosse, Anthony Beks and Paul Kingsman.

=== 1990 Commonwealth games ===
Anderson struck bronze in his second Commonwealth games, this time in the Men's 4 × 200 m freestyle relay team at the 1990 Commonwealth Games held in Auckland. Anderson and Mosse were joined by John Steel and Richard Tapper as they finished behind the Australians and Canadians. He claimed two individual 7th-place finishes in the 100 metre butterfly and 200 meter butterfly at the games.

=== 1991 Pan Pacific championships ===
Anderson's last major international meet for New Zealand was the 1991 Pan Pacific Swimming Championships held in Edmonton, Canada. In the preliminaries he finished in 56.46 in the 100 metre butterfly and 2:05.40 in the 200 metre butterfly.

He was awarded the New Zealand 1990 Commemoration Medal.

== See also ==
- List of Commonwealth Games medallists in swimming (men)
