= Michelle Telfer =

Australian artistic gymnast

Personal information
- Nationality: Australian
- Born: 8 January 1974 (age 52) Perth

Sport
- Sport: Gymnastics
Medal record
Gymnastics
Representing Australia
Commonwealth Games
Silver medal – second place	1990 Auckland	Women's Team
Bronze medal – third place	1990 Auckland	Women's Uneven Bars

Michelle Marian Telfer (born 8 January 1974) is an Australian paediatrician and a former gymnast who represented Australia at the 1992 Summer Olympics.

== Gymnastics career ==
Liz Chetkovich first identified Telfer's talent in 1981 at the age of seven. In 1988, at the age of 14, Telfer was chosen to join the WAIS elite squad, training full-time. Telfer went on to represent Australia in the Junior Pacific Alliance Competition in Colorado Springs and the Gymnastics World Championships in West Germany in 1989.

In 1990, Telfer was selected for the Commonwealth Games in New Zealand, receiving a bronze medal on bars, which was the first medal achieved by a WAIS gymnast at a Commonwealth Games. In that same year, she won the Junior Sports Star of the Year Award in 1990 and 1991.

Telfer represented Australia at the 1992 Summer Olympics in Barcelona. Telfer retired from gymnastics at the age of 18.

== Medical career ==
After the 1992 Olympic Games, Telfer studied medicine at the University of Western Australia and became a paediatrician. She is now an associate professor in adolescent medicine at the Royal Children's Hospital in Melbourne.

Prior to running the gender services, she had not met a trans child until being tasked to taking over care for trans children. Her third patient, Georgie Stone, became an advocate for transgender rights. Telfer was lead author of the Australian Standards of Care and treatment guidelines for trans and gender diverse children and adolescents.

She was added to the Victorian Honour Roll of Women in 2022 for her medical career.

In 2025, it was revealed in a Federal Court judgment that Telfer was the anonymous "Professor L" whose evidence in a high-profile gender dysphoria case was excoriated by the judge for being biased, ideological, and lacking in scientific rigour. The court found her allegiance to the gender-affirming model compromised her objectivity and criticised her for dismissing alternative clinical perspectives.

== Personal life ==
Telfer is married to Angus Grant. They have two children.

== Filmography ==
=== Film ===
Year	Title	Role	Notes	Ref.
2022	The Dreamlife of Georgie Stone	Herself	Documentary short	

=== Television ===
Year	Title	Role	Notes	Ref.
2016	Australian Story	Herself	Episode: About A Girl	
