= Phillippa Langrell =

New Zealand swimmer

Personal information
- Born: Phillippa Maree Langrell; 4 July 1972 (age 54) Timaru, New Zealand

Sport
- Country: New Zealand
- Sport: Swimming
- Strokes: Freestyle
Medal record
Women's swimming
Representing New Zealand
Commonwealth Games
Bronze medal – third place	1990 Auckland	4 × 200 m freestyle relay

Phillippa Maree Langrell (born 4 July 1972) is a New Zealand swimmer who represented her country at the 1992 Summer Olympics and at the 1990 Commonwealth Games and 1994 Commonwealth Games.

Langrell started swimming when she was three years old and started training a couple of years later. At the age of ten she was selected for the national age-group team and was first selected at senior level when she was 16 years old.

In 1989, she won the South Canterbury Sportsperson of the Year.

Langrell won a bronze medal at the 1990 Commonwealth Games in the 4 × 200 metre freestyle relay, and also placed fourth in the 400 and 800 metre freestyle events. Later that year, she was awarded the New Zealand 1990 Commemoration Medal.

Two years later, aged twenty, Langrell went to the 1992 Summer Olympics in Barcelona to compete in three events. In the 400 metre freestyle she broke the national record in the heats, swimming a time of 4:14.0 and finishing ninth, 0.15 seconds outside the final. She won the B final and again broke her national record, with a time of 4:12.96. Next up was the 800 metre freestyle: in the heats she qualified fifth, and she finished fourth in the final, just over 4.5 seconds behind the German Jana Henke who won the bronze. Again, Langrell broke the national record in both her heat and the final. In her other event, the 400 metre individual medley, she again broke the national record in the heats, but was ranked 17th and did not qualify for the finals.

Langrell also competed at the 1994 Commonwealth Games, where she finished fourth in the 800 metre freestyle and sixth in the 400 metre freestyle.

After retiring from competitive swimming, Langrell earned a Bachelor of Science degree majoring in psychology at the University of Canterbury, before graduating from the New Zealand College of Chiropractic in Auckland. Langrell has been a practising chiropractor since 1999.
