= Andrew Baildon =

Australian swimmer

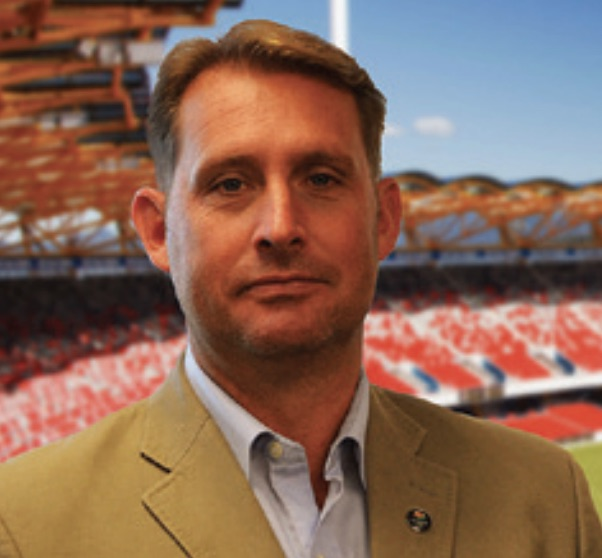
- Baildon in 2015

Personal information
- Full name: Andrew James Baildon
- National team: Australia
- Born: 25 August 1971 (age 54) Southport, Queensland
- Height: 1.86 m (6 ft 1 in)

Sport
- Sport: Swimming
- Strokes: Freestyle, butterfly
Medal record
Men's swimming
Representing Australia
Pan Pacific Games
Silver medal – second place	1989 Tokyo	50 m freestyle
Silver medal – second place	1989 Tokyo	100 m freestyle
Silver medal – second place	1991 Edmonton	4x100m freestyle
Silver medal – second place	1993 Kobe	4x100m freestyle
Bronze medal – third place	1987 Brisbane	50 m freestyle
Commonwealth Games
Gold medal – first place	1990 Auckland	50m freestyle
Gold medal – first place	1990 Auckland	100m freestyle
Gold medal – first place	1990 Auckland	100m butterfly
Gold medal – first place	1990 Auckland	4x100m freestyle
Gold medal – first place	1994 Victoria	4x100m freestyle
Bronze medal – third place	1990 Auckland	4x100m medley
Bronze medal – third place	1994 Victoria	100m freestyle

Andrew James Baildon (born 25 August 1971), is an Australian former freestyle and butterfly swimming champion, who represented Australia in the 1988 Summer Olympics in Seoul, and the 1992 Summer Olympics in Barcelona.

== Early life and family ==
Baildon was born on 25 August 1971, on the Gold Coast, Australia. His father, Gary Baildon, was mayor of the Gold Coast from 1994 to 1995, and again from 1997 until 2004.

He has been awarded Knight of Grace (Order of St John), Doctor of the University (Griffith 2005), The Centenary Medal, The 1995 Australian Tourism Council Award, Paul Harris Fellow (Rotary International), in 2010 Gary was made a Member of the Order of Australia (AM), he was the 2016 Gold Coast Citizen of the Year, and returned to local government in 2016 as a Gold Coast Councillor.

Baildon studied at The Southport School (TSS) from 1979 to 1988, was the Kaiser House Captain and School Foundation Prefect, attained TSS Sporting Colours in Year 9 and became Cadet Under Officer in the TSS Cadets.

As a 16-year-old schoolboy, Baildon was the youngest male selected to represent his country at an Olympics (Seoul 1988) since Australian Michael Wenden (dual Olympic Swimming Gold Medallist, World Record Holder and Commonwealth Champion). As well as equalling Wenden's record of four gold medals at a single Commonwealth Games, Baildon became his son-in-law when he married Karen Wenden (1989 Miss Universe Miss Photogenic, Queensland state level swimming champion) at The Southport School (TSS) in 1998.

Baildon was a Foundation Student at Bond University from 1989 to 1995, attaining a Bachelor in Communication (Marketing).

Baildon has two children with his wife Karen, Yasmin and Flynn.

== Career ==
Andrew was a medalist at the 1990 Commonwealth Games in Auckland, New Zealand where he became the first swimmer in the Commonwealth to break the 50-second barrier for the 100 m freestyle, breaking his own Commonwealth record to win gold (49.80s), and the 1994 Commonwealth Games in Victoria, Canada. He was a medalist in the 4 Pan Pacific Swimming Championships.

In 1990, Andrew achieved the No. 1 World ranking for 100 m Butterfly (Short Course).

Andrew was the Australian Team Representative for over a decade, an Australian record holder for the 50 and 100-metre freestyle from 1989–1996 and the Commonwealth record holder for most of that period. He was ranked in the top twenty swimmers in the world for over a decade.

== Representing Australia ==
Andrew was the Australian Team Captain in 1993 and 1994 (when Australia achieved one of its best pool Commonwealth Games performances in Canada) and the Australian Team Representative for over a decade.

Andrew was awarded the Australian Sports Medal for this service to sport.

2018 Gold Coast Commonwealth Games:

- Ambassador, Commonwealth Games Bid in St Kits & Nevis, instrumental in successfully bringing the 2018 Commonwealth Games to the Gold Coast, 2016
- Member of the Sport & Technical Committee
- Chairman of the Athletes Advisory Board
- Australian Commonwealth Games Team Attaché
- Member of the Queensland State Government's Legacy Committee

== Australian Swimming ==
Board Member:

- Australian Swimming, 2018
- Australian Sports Foundation, 2018 (current)
- ASCTA, 2018

Guest Speaker:

- ASCTA Swim Conference, 2018
- National Australian Swim Conference, 2009

== Australian Government – Australian Sports Foundation Limited ==
Board Member, 2018 (current)

== Television ==
- FOX Sport Swimming Commentator: 2000 Olympic Swimming Trials
- Channel 7 Expert Swimming Commentator: 2000 Sydney Olympic Games

== Honours ==
Australian Sports Medal June 2000

- Sydney 2000 Olympic Torchbearer with his father Gary Baildon AM. Andrew was invited to light the Cauldron for the Gold Coast.
- 2006 Commonwealth Games Baton Relay, Melbourne
- 2018 Commonwealth Games Queens Baton Relay, Gold Coast
- 2018 Invited to "A Celebration of the Commonwealth" at Buckingham Palace, in the presence of the Queen and other members of the royal family.
- 2018 Awarded the Keys to The City of Brisbane with the Australian Commonwealth Games Team, 2018

== Business ==
Andrew and his wife Karen operate Baildon Group, encompassing

- Andrew Baildon's Superfish Swim Schools, Brisbane and Gold Coast, specializing in "Learn to Swim" and Drowning Prevention programs.
- Jetts Fitness Coomera
- Jetts Fitness Pacific Pines
- Jetts Fitness Pimpama
- Opened the inaugural Andrew Baildon Aquatic Centre on the Gold Coast in 1996 with wife Karen (daughter of swimming great Michael Wenden) teaching over 1000 children per week in the first year.
- Bachelor of Business, Communication (Marketing), Bond University, 1989–1995 (Foundation Student)

== Awards ==
- South-East Queensland Business Achievers Award for Sport and Recreation, 2006
- Swim Australia Best Swim School for Marketing, Promotion and Customer Service, 2017

== See also ==
- List of Commonwealth Games medallists in swimming (men)
