= Angus Waddell =

Australian swimmer

Personal information
- Full name: Angus James Waddell
- National team: Australia
- Born: 25 July 1964 (age 61)

Sport
- Sport: Swimming
- Strokes: Freestyle
Medal record
Commonwealth Games
Gold medal – first place	1990 Auckland	50 freestyle

Angus James Waddell (born 25 July 1964) is a former freestyle swimmer who competed for Australia at the 1992 Summer Olympics in Barcelona, Spain. There he finished in 15th overall position in the 50-metre freestyle.

Angus Waddell finished 10th in the high jump at the 1982 Commonwealth Games in Brisbane and eight years later won a silver medal in the 50-metre freestyle at the 1990 Commonwealth Games in Auckland, New Zealand. This made him the first athlete to compete in the Commonwealth Games in two different sports.

== See also ==
- List of Commonwealth Games medallists in swimming (men)
