= Synchronised swimming at the Commonwealth Games =

Synchronised swimming was one of the sports at the quadrennial Commonwealth Games competition. The artistic sport made its debut at the 1986 Commonwealth Games and ran until the 2010 Commonwealth Games. It is an optional sport and may, or may not, be included in the sporting programme of each edition of the Games.

== Editions ==
Games	Year	Host city	Host country	Best nation
XIII	1986	Edinburgh	Scotland	Canada
XIV	1990	Auckland	New Zealand	Canada
XV	1994	Victoria	Canada	Canada
XVI	1998	Kuala Lumpur	Malaysia	Canada
XVII	2002	Manchester	England	Canada
XVIII	2006	Melbourne	Australia	Canada
XIX	2010	Delhi	India	Canada

== All-time medal table ==
Rank	Nation	Gold	Silver	Bronze	Total
1	Canada	15	1	1	17
2	England	0	11	2	13
3	Australia	0	3	9	12
4	New Zealand	0	0	2	2
5	Scotland	0	0	1	1
Totals (5 entries)		15	15	15	45
