= Gary Lord (swimmer) =

Australian swimmer

Personal information
- Born: Gary Michael Lord; 30 November 1967 (age 58)

Sport
- Country: Australia
- Sport: Swimming
- Event: Freestyle
Medal record
Commonwealth Games
| Gold medal – first place | 1990 Auckland | 4×200 m freestyle |

Gary Michael Lord (born 30 November 1967) is an Australian former swimmer.

Lord grew up in the Illawarra and trained at the Shellharbour-Warilla Amateur Swimming Club, where his father Mick was a swim coach. His sister Karen was a swimmer and featured at the 1988 Summer Olympics. An uncle, soccer goalkeeper Ron Lord, was also an Olympian.

An Australian Institute of Sport scholarship holder, Lord was a member of Australia's gold medal-winning 4 × 200 metre freestyle relay team at the Auckland Commonwealth Games. They swam the final in a games record time. He also swam in the 100 metre freestyle event and finished sixth.
