= Austyn Shortman =

Personal information
- Nationality: English
- Born: 1972 (age 53–54) Bristol, England
Medal record
Swimming
Representing England
Commonwealth Games
Silver medal – second place	1990 Auckland	freestyle relay
Silver medal – second place	1990 Auckland	medley relay

Austyn Shortman (born 1972), is a male former swimmer who competed for England.

== Swimming career ==
Shortman represented England and won two silver medals in the 4 x 100 metres freestyle relay and the 4 x 100 metres medley relay, at the 1990 Commonwealth Games in Auckland, New Zealand.
