= Steve Dronsfield =

English swimmer

Personal information
- Nationality: English
- Born: 1971 (age 54–55) Oldham, Lancashire, England
- Occupation: Former swimmer.

Sport
- Country: England

Achievements and titles
- National finals: a
Medal record
Swimming
Representing England
Commonwealth Games
Silver medal – second place	1990 Auckland	freestyle relay

Steven James Dronsfield (born 1971), is a male former swimmer who competed for England.

== Swimming career ==
Dronsfield represented England in the 100 metres butterfly and the 100 metres freestyle events and won a silver medal in the 4 x 100 metres freestyle relay, at the 1990 Commonwealth Games in Auckland, New Zealand.
