= Nathalie Giguère =

Canadian swimmer (born 1973)

Personal information
- Full name: Nathalie Giguère
- National team: Canada
- Born: January 16, 1973 (age 53) Quebec City, Quebec
- Height: 1.57 m (5 ft 2 in)
- Weight: 51 kg (112 lb)

Sport
- Sport: Swimming
- Strokes: Breaststroke
- Club: Select de Sainte-Foy
Medal record
Women's swimming
Representing Canada
Pan Pacific Championships
Silver medal – second place	1989 Tokyo	200 m breaststroke
Commonwealth Games
Gold medal – first place	1990 Auckland	200 m breaststroke

Nathalie Giguère (born January 16, 1973) is a former breaststroke swimmer from Canada, who competed for her native country at the 1992 Summer Olympics in Barcelona, Spain. There she finished in sixth position in the women's 200-metre breaststroke.

Giguère was also an Olympic torch relay runner in Châteauguay, Quebec, for the 2010 Winter Olympics in Vancouver, British Columbia.
