= James Parrack =

British swimmer and sports journalist

Personal information
- Nationality: English
- Born: 10 March 1967 (age 59) Cheltenham, England
- Education: Cheltenham Grammar School; Leeds Polytechnic

Sport
- University team: Leeds Polytechnic
Medal record
Swimming
Representing England
Commonwealth Games
Silver medal – second place	1990 Auckland	100m breaststroke

James Guy Parrack (born 10 March 1967, Cheltenham, England) is a male English sports journalist and former competitive swimmer.

== Early life ==
He attended Dunally Primary School, and Cheltenham Grammar School. He went to Leeds Polytechnic, to study accounting and finance.

== Swimming career ==
As a breaststroke swimmer, he represented Great Britain at the 1988 Olympic Games on Seoul. He represented England a silver medal in the 100 metres breaststroke, at the 1990 Commonwealth Games in Auckland, New Zealand. Four years later he represented England again at the 1994 Commonwealth Games in the 100 metres breaststroke event.

He was also four times ASA British national champion in the 100 metres breaststroke (1988, 1994, 1995) and 50 metres breaststroke (1995).

== Journalism ==
Parrack currently commentates on swimming for the Eurosport television channel with Drew Gordon. He has also written for The Independent newspaper and various swimming magazines.

== See also ==
- List of Commonwealth Games medallists in swimming (men)
