= Joanne Henry =

New Zealand heptathlete (born 1971)

Medal record

Women's athletics

Representing New Zealand

Commonwealth Games
Bronze medal – third place	1998 Kuala Lumpur	Heptathlon

Joanne Carol Henry (born 2 October 1971) is a former New Zealand heptathlete. She won a bronze medal in the women's heptathlon at the 1998 Commonwealth Games.

In 1990, Henry was awarded the New Zealand 1990 Commemoration Medal.
