= Simon Upton (swimmer) =

Australian swimmer

Personal information
- Born: 1 May 1969 (age 57)

Sport
- Sport: Swimming
- Strokes: Backstroke

Simon Upton (born 1 May 1969) is an Australian swimmer. He competed in two events at the 1988 Summer Olympics.
