= Monique Rodahl =

New Zealand swimmer (born 1960)

Personal information
- Born: 29 June 1960 (age 66) Auckland, New Zealand

Sport
- Sport: Swimming

Monique Bernice Rodahl, later Williams (born 29 June 1960) is a New Zealand swimmer. She competed in three events at the 1976 Summer Olympics.

She is the granddaughter of Dutch Olympic cyclist Bernard Leene.
