= Richard Lockhart =

New Zealand swimmer

Personal information
- Full name: Richard George Simon Lockhart
- Born: 3 January 1963 (age 63) Wellington, New Zealand
- Occupation: Accountant

Sport
- Country: New Zealand
- Sport: Swimming

Richard George Simon Lockhart (born 3 January 1963) is a New Zealand swimmer. He competed in two events at the 1988 Summer Olympics. Lockhart also represented New Zealand in the 1983, 1985 and 1987 World Student Games.

== Early life and family ==
Lockhart was born in Wellington on 3 January 1963, the son of Simon Grant Lockhart, a lawyer and later Queen's Counsel and district court judge, and Georgette Muriel Lockhart (née Cooper). He was educated at King's College, Auckland, and went on to study at the University of Auckland, graduating with a Master of Commerce degree in 1988.

== Swimming ==
In 1986, Lockhart competed in 100 and 200 breaststroke at the XIII Commonwealth Games held in Edinburgh, Scotland. In the 100 breaststroke, he swam a time of 1:06.74 earning him 13th place overall. In the 200 breaststroke, he swam a time of 2:25.50 earning him 13th place behind fellow New Zealand swimmer Grant Forbes (2:24.89). In the same year, he also competed at the 1986 FINA World Swimming Championships held in Madrid.

During the 1988 Summer Olympic Games, Lockhart competed in the men's 100 metre and 200 metre breaststroke events. During the 100 breaststroke, Lockhart finished 46th out of 61 competitors. In the 200 breaststroke, he finished 36th out of 53 competitors.

In 1990, Lockhart returned to the XIV Commonwealth Games held in Auckland, New Zealand swimming the 100 and 200 breaststroke as well as the breaststroke leg on the 4x100 men's Medley Relay. In the 100 breaststroke he finished in 10th place overall with a time of 1:05.05. During the 200 breaststroke, he finished 10th with a time of 2:23.46 just ahead of fellow countryman Grant Forbes (2:23.53). Later in 1990, Lockhart retired from swimming. He was also awarded the New Zealand 1990 Commemoration Medal.

After a 14-year break, Lockhart resumed swimming in masters events, and competed at the 2009 and 2013 World Masters Games (2009 and 2013) where he claimed six gold medals in the pool. In 2014, Lockhart was named New Zealand Masters Swimmer of the Year at the annual Swimming New Zealand Awards.

Out of the pool, Lockhart was a member of the Athletes' Commission of the New Zealand Olympic and Commonwealth Games Association between 1987 and 1993, and was appointed the financial director of the New Zealand Swimming Federation in 1992.

== Career ==
Professionally, Lockhart has worked as an accountant, becoming an associate chartered accountant in 1992. Between 1989 and 1992, he worked for the chartered accountancy firm Gosling Chapman, before moving to be an accountant at Rheem New Zealand in 1992. He is now a principal of Auckland chartered accounting firm Lockhart O'Shea.
