= Robert Bruce (swimmer) =

Australian swimmer

Personal information
- National team: Australia
- Born: 11 March 1969 (age 57)
- Height: 1.92 m (6 ft 4 in)
- Weight: 80 kg (180 lb)

Sport
- Sport: Swimming
- Strokes: medley
- Club: Carlisle Swimming Club
Medal record
Commonwealth Games
Gold medal – first place	1990 Auckland	400 m individual medley
Silver medal – second place	1990 Auckland	200 m individual medley

Robert Bruce (born 11 March 1969) is an Australian former swimmer who competed in the 1988 Summer Olympics in Seoul, South Korea. As a 19-year-old, Bruce finished sixth in the final of the 200-metre individual medley, and third in the B final of the 400-metre individual medley.

== See also ==
- List of Commonwealth Games medallists in swimming (men)
