= Glen Housman =

Australian swimmer (born 1971)

Personal information
- Full name: Glen Clifford Housman
- National team: Australia
- Born: 3 September 1971 (age 55) Rockhampton, Queensland
- Height: 1.84 m (6 ft 0 in)
- Weight: 80 kg (176 lb)

Sport
- Sport: Swimming
- Strokes: Freestyle
- Club: Commercial Swim Club
Medal record
Men's swimming
Representing Australia
Olympic Games
Silver medal – second place	1992 Barcelona	1500 m freestyle
Pan Pacific Championships
Gold medal – first place	1989 Tokyo	1500m freestyle
Gold medal – first place	1995 Atlanta	4×200m freestyle
Commonwealth Games
Gold medal – first place	1990 Auckland	1500m freestyle
Gold medal – first place	1994 Victoria	4×200m freestyle

Glen Clifford Housman (born 3 September 1971) is an Australian former distance freestyle swimmer of the 1980s and 1990s, who won the silver medal in the 1500-metre freestyle, swimming at the 1992 Summer Olympics. His career was overshadowed by fellow Australian Kieren Perkins, and was also marred by illness.

Housman entered the international stage after winning the 400-, 800- and 1500-metre freestyle events at the 1989 Australian championships, gaining selection for the Pan Pacific Championships in Tokyo, where he claimed gold in the 1500-metre event. He continued to improve, breaking the 1500-metre world record in Adelaide at the Australian trials for the 1990 Commonwealth Games in Auckland. However, this record was disallowed as the electronic timing equipment failed as he touched the finishing wall, even though he was clearly ahead of the world record as he touched. Housman proceeded to win a gold and silver in the 1500- and 400-metre freestyle events respectively in Auckland.

In 1991, Housman was struck down by illness, and was forced to sit on the sidelines as Perkins claimed the 1500-metre freestyle world record. He returned at the 1992 Summer Olympics, where despite swimming a fine race, he was completely overshadowed as Perkins swept all before him. Housman was once again absent in 1993 due to illness, returning to the pool for the 1994 Commonwealth Games only to finish 3rd in the 1500-metre freestyle, trailing Perkins and Daniel Kowalski. He also won gold in the 4×200-metre freestyle relay.

Housman's final international campaign at the 1996 Summer Olympics was a disappointment. He missed out on selection for the 1500-metre behind Perkins and Kowalski, and was relegated to the role of a heat swimmer for the 4×200-metre freestyle relay team, which later finished fourth.

== Awards ==
- 1990 – Australian Swimmer of the Year

== Personal life ==
Housman married Jodie Clatworthy, a fellow Australian swimmer who competed at the 1988 Olympics.

== See also ==
- List of Commonwealth Games medallists in swimming (men)
- List of Olympic medalists in swimming (men)
