= Ian McAdam =

Australian swimmer

Personal information
- Born: 29 July 1968 (age 57)

Sport
- Sport: Swimming
- Strokes: breaststroke

Ian McAdam (born 29 July 1968) is an Australian swimmer. He competed in three events at the 1988 Summer Olympics.
