= Rodney Lawson =

Australian swimmer

Personal information
- Born: 2 December 1969 (age 56)

Sport
- Sport: Swimming
- Strokes: breaststroke
Medal record
Commonwealth Games
Silver medal – second place	1990 Auckland	200 m breaststroke

Rodney James Lawson (born 2 December 1969) is an Australian swimmer. He competed in the men's 200 metre breaststroke event at the 1992 Summer Olympics.
