= Julie McDonald (swimmer, born 1970) =

Australian long-distance freestyle swimmer (born 1970)

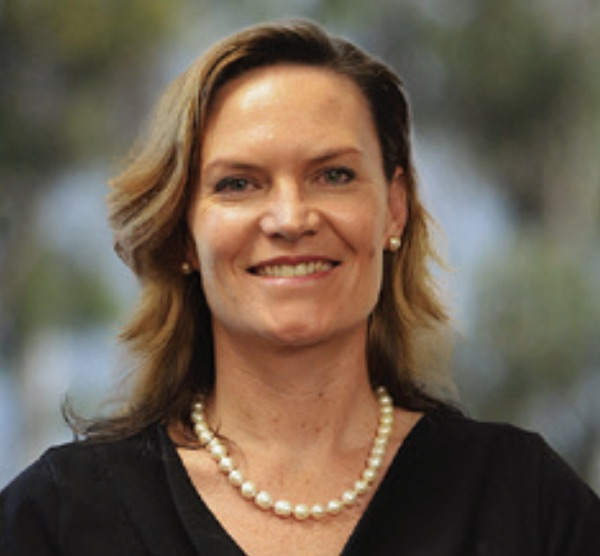
- McDonald in 2015

Personal information
- Full name: Julie Maree McDonald
- National team: Australia
- Born: 14 March 1970 (age 56) Queensland
- Height: 1.74 m (5 ft 9 in)
- Weight: 66 kg (146 lb)

Sport
- Sport: Swimming
- Strokes: Freestyle
Medal record
Women's swimming
Representing Australia
Olympic Games
Bronze medal – third place	1988 Seoul	800 m freestyle
Pan Pacific Championships
Gold medal – first place	1987 Brisbane	800 m freestyle
Silver medal – second place	1987 Brisbane	400 m freestyle
Bronze medal – third place	1989 Tokyo	1500 m freestyle
Commonwealth Games
Gold medal – first place	1990 Auckland	800 m freestyle
Gold medal – first place	1990 Auckland	4×200 m freestyle
Silver medal – second place	1986 Edinburgh	800 m freestyle
Silver medal – second place	1990 Auckland	400 m freestyle

Julie Maree McDonald OAM (born 14 March 1970) is an Australian former long-distance freestyle swimmer of the 1980s and 1990s, who won a bronze medal in the 800-metre freestyle, swimming at the 1988 Summer Olympics in Seoul. She was often considered to be an outspoken and controversial swimmer, who switched to distance freestyle after starting as backstroker.

Her first international achievement was her debut at the 1986 Commonwealth Games in Edinburgh, where she claimed a silver in the 800-metre freestyle, and the following year, she claimed gold and silver in the 800- and 400-metre freestyle events at the Pan Pacific Swimming Championships, setting a Commonwealth 800-metre freestyle record of 8 minutes 23.18 seconds, and defeating world record-holder Janet Evans of the United States. McDonald came to the 1988 Seoul Olympics as one of the fancied competitors in the 800m freestyle, and claimed the bronze medal, behind Janet Evans and East Germany's Astrid Strauss.

McDonald was the subject of controversy at the 1990 Commonwealth Games in Auckland when she apparently showed disdain at the selection of fellow distance swimmer, the flame-haired Janelle Elford. McDonald was quoted as saying "I thought a typical Aussie had blonde hair, blue eyes and a tan . . . I feel snubbed and unrecognized. After all I've got an Olympic bronze and hold the Commonwealth record." She later claimed to have been misquoted. McDonald proceeded to win gold and silver medals in the 800- and 400-metre freestyle events, finishing one position ahead of Elford in both cases. She also claimed a gold in the 4×200-metre freestyle relay alongside Elford.

The Queensland swimmer finally got her recognition, when she was named as the Australian swimming captain for the 1991 World Championships in Perth. After failing to qualify for either the 400- or 800-metre freestyle final at the 1992 Summer Olympics in Barcelona, she retired, but made a comeback in 1995 in an unsuccessful attempt to qualify for the 1996 Summer Olympics in Atlanta.

Julie McDonald is the sister of former Seven newsreader, Darren McDonald.

In June 2006 Julie received a Queen's Birthday Award, an OAM for her services to Swimming, The Olympic Movement and Charities.

== See also ==
- List of Olympic medalists in swimming (women)

== Notes ==
- Andrews, Malcolm (2000). Australia at the Olympic Games. Sydney, New South Wales: ABC Books. pp. 266–267. ISBN 0-7333-0884-8.
