= Anna Simcic =

New Zealand swimmer (born 1971)

Personal information
- Born: Anna Katrina Simcic; 8 November 1971 (age 54)

Sport
- Club: California Golden Bears, Berkeley (USA)
Medal record
Women's swimming
Representing New Zealand
Pan Pacific Championships
Gold medal – first place	1991 Edmonton	200 m backstroke
Silver medal – second place	1989 Tokyo	200 m backstroke
Commonwealth Games
Gold medal – first place	1990 Auckland	200 m backstroke
Silver medal – second place	1990 Auckland	100 m backstroke
Silver medal – second place	1994 Victoria	200 m backstroke

Anna Katrina Simcic (born 8 November 1971), married name Anna Forrest, is a female former New Zealand swimming representative. In August 2021, it was announced that she would feature in the 2021 Season of Celebrity Treasure Island 2021.

== Swimming career ==
Simcic represented New Zealand at two Olympic Games.

At the 1992 Summer Olympics she placed 5th in the final of the women's 200 m backstroke. In 1996 at the Atlanta Olympics she placed 6th in the same event.

She won a gold medal at the 1990 Commonwealth Games in the women's 200 m backstroke. At the same Games she also won a silver medal in the women's 100 m backstroke. Four years later at the 1994 Commonwealth Games she won another silver medal in the women's 200 m backstroke. Despite being of New Zealand nationality she won the ASA National British Championships 200 metres backstroke title in 1990.

== Personal life ==
Simcic is married to former professional rugby player Simon Forrest.

Awards
Preceded by Gary Anderson	Lonsdale Cup of the New Zealand Olympic Committee; 1991	Succeeded by Danyon Loader
