= Jodie Clatworthy =

Australian swimmer

Personal information
- Full name: Jodie Michelle Clatworthy
- National team: Australia
- Born: 3 April 1972 (age 54)
- Height: 1.68 m (5 ft 6 in)
- Weight: 53 kg (117 lb)

Sport
- Sport: Swimming
- Strokes: Medley
Medal record
Women's swimming
Representing Australia
Commonwealth Games
Silver medal – second place	1986 Edinburgh	400 m medley
Silver medal – second place	1990 Auckland	200 m medley
Silver medal – second place	1990 Auckland	400 m medley

Jodie Michelle Clatworthy (born 3 April 1972), also known by her married name Jodie Housman, is an Australian former competitive swimmer and individual medley specialist.

As a 16-year-old, Clatworthy represented Australia at the 1988 Summer Olympics in Seoul, South Korea. She competed in the 200-metre and 400-metre individual medley events, advanced to the final of both, and finished fourth and sixth, respectively.

Clatworthy is a three-time Commonwealth Games silver medallist. At the 1986 Commonwealth Games in Edinburgh, Scotland, she won her first silver in the women's 400-metre individual medley, finishing behind fellow Australian Suzie Landells. Four years later when Auckland, New Zealand hosted the 1990 Commonwealth Games, she qualified for both individual medley events. In the 200-metre individual medley, she came second behind Canadian Nancy Sweetman, and in the 400-metre individual medley event she was runner-up to Australian Hayley Lewis.

Clatworthy is married to fellow Australian Olympic swimmer Glen Housman.

== See also ==
- List of alumni of Brisbane State High School
- List of Commonwealth Games medallists in swimming (women)

== Bibliography ==
- Andrews, Malcolm (2000). Australia at the Olympic Games. Sydney, New South Wales: Australian Broadcasting Corporation Books. ISBN 0-7333-0884-8.
