= Jason Cooper (swimmer) =

Australian swimmer

Personal information
- Born: 16 February 1972 (age 54)

Sport
- Country: Australia
- Sport: Swimming
- Event: Freestyle / Butterfly
Medal record
Commonwealth Games
Gold medal – first place	1990 Auckland	4×100 m freestyle
Bronze medal – third place	1990 Auckland	100 m butterfly

Jason Charles Cooper (born 16 February 1972) is an Australian former swimmer.

A butterfly and freestyle swimmer, Cooper began training around the age of eight and was a student at Brisbane State High School. In 1990, he was a member of the gold medal-winning 4 × 100 m freestyle relay team at the Auckland Commonwealth Games and won a bronze medal in the 100 metres butterfly. He competed at the 1991 World Championships and made the B final of the 100 metres butterfly. In 1992, he missed selection for the Barcelona Olympic team by 0.05 seconds. He was a national title holder in the 50 metres butterfly, a non-Olympic event.
