= Sheridan Burge-Lopez =

Australian swimmer

Personal information
- Full name: Sheridan Christina Burge-Lopez
- Born: 17 January 1970 (age 56)
- Height: 173 cm (5 ft 8 in)
- Weight: 66 kg (146 lb)

Sport
- Sport: Swimming
Medal record
Commonwealth Games
Bronze medal – third place	1990 Auckland	800 m freestyle

Sheridan Christina Burge-Lopez (born 17 January 1970) is an Australian swimmer. She competed in two events at the 1988 Summer Olympics.
