= Ian Brown (swimmer) =

Australian swimmer

Personal information
- Full name: Ian Robert Brown
- National team: Australia
- Born: 14 August 1965 (age 60)
- Height: 1.86 m (6 ft 1 in)
- Weight: 74 kg (163 lb)

Sport
- Sport: Swimming
- Strokes: Freestyle
Medal record
Men's swimming
Representing Australia
Pan Pacific Championships
Gold medal – first place	1991 Edmonton	200m freestyle
Silver medal – second place	1991 Edmonton	400m freestyle
Silver medal – second place	1991 Edmonton	4x200m freestyle
Commonwealth Games
Gold medal – first place	1990 Auckland	400 m freestyle
Gold medal – first place	1990 Auckland	4x200 m freestyle
Silver medal – second place	1990 Auckland	200 m freestyle

Ian Robert Brown (born 14 August 1965) is a former freestyle swimmer who twice represented Australia at the Summer Olympics. He made his debut in 1988. His best Olympic result was the fifth place, four years later in Barcelona, Spain, in the men's 400 m freestyle.

== See also ==
- List of Commonwealth Games medallists in swimming (men)
