= Michael McKenzie (swimmer) =

Australian swimmer

Personal information
- Nickname: Michael Bruce McKenzie
- National team: Australia
- Born: 3 July 1967 (age 59)
- Height: 1.84 m (6 ft 0 in)
- Weight: 74 kg (163 lb)

Sport
- Sport: Swimming
- Strokes: Freestyle
Medal record
Men's swimming
Representing Australia
Pan Pacific Championships
Gold medal – first place	1985 Tokyo	1500m freestyle
Gold medal – first place	1987 Brisbane	1500m freestyle
Gold medal – first place	1989 Tokyo	800m freestyle
Bronze medal – third place	1989 Tokyo	1500m freestyle
Commonwealth Games
Silver medal – second place	1986 Edinburgh	1500m freestyle
Bronze medal – third place	1990 Auckland	1500m freestyle

Michael Bruce McKenzie (born 3 July 1967) is an Australian former long-distance freestyle swimmer who represented Australia at the 1988 Summer Olympics in Seoul, South Korea. He came 11th in the 1500m freestyle with a time of 15:19.34 in the qualifying heats.

He was an Australian Institute of Sport scholarship holder.

== See also ==
- List of Commonwealth Games medallists in swimming (men)
