= Matthew Renshaw (swimmer) =

Australian swimmer

Personal information
- Born: Matthew Douglas Renshaw; 31 October 1964 (age 62)

Sport
- Country: Australia
- Sport: Swimming
- Event: Freestyle
Medal record
Commonwealth Games
Gold medal – first place	1986 Edinburgh	4×100 m freestyle
Gold medal – first place	1990 Auckland	4×100 m freestyle
Pan Pacific Championships
Silver medal – second place	1985 Tokyo	4×100 m medley
Silver medal – second place	1991 Edmonton	4×100 m freestyle
Bronze medal – third place	1985 Tokyo	100 m freestyle
Bronze medal – third place	1985 Tokyo	4×100 m freestyle

Matthew Douglas Renshaw (born 31 October 1964) is an Australian former swimmer of the 1980s and early 1990s.

Renshaw, a graduate of Sydney's Barker College, trained with the Carlile swimming club.

During the 1980s, Renshaw featured in Australia's 4 × 100 m freestyle relay quartet known as the "Mean Machine", which most famously included Neil Brooks. At the 1986 Commonwealth Games in Edinburgh, he and his teammates set a games record in the final to win the 4 × 100 m freestyle gold medal. He won a further Commonwealth Games gold medal in Auckland in 1990, swimming the heats for the winning 4 × 100 m freestyle relay team.

Renshaw swam in two World Championships, in Madrid in 1986 and Perth in 1991.
