= Fiona Alessandri =

Australian swimmer

Personal information
- Born: 5 November 1967 (age 58)

Sport
- Sport: Swimming

Fiona Michelle Alessandri Wildy (born 5 November 1967) is an Australian swimmer. She competed in four events at the 1988 Summer Olympics.
