= Martin Roberts (swimmer) =

Australian swimmer

Personal information
- Full name: Martin Wade Roberts
- National team: Australia
- Born: 19 June 1966 (age 60) Adelaide, South Australia
- Height: 1.99 m (6 ft 6 in)
- Weight: 84 kg (185 lb)

Sport
- Sport: Swimming
- Strokes: Butterfly, Freestyle, medley
Medal record
Commonwealth Games
| Gold medal – first place | 1990 Auckland | 200 m freestyle |
| Gold medal – first place | 1990 Auckland | 4x200 m freestyle |
| Silver medal – second place | 1990 Auckland | 200 m butterfly |
| Bronze medal – third place | 1990 Auckland | 200 m individual medley |
| Gold medal – first place | 1994 Victoria BC | 4x200 m freestyle |

Martin Wade Roberts (born 19 June 1966) is an Australian former swimmer who competed in the 1988 Summer Olympics and 1992 Summer Olympics.

== See also ==
- List of Commonwealth Games medallists in swimming (men)
