= David Wilson (swimmer) =

Australian swimmer

Personal information
- Born: 28 October 1966 (age 59) Geelong, Victoria, Australia

Sport
- Sport: Swimming

David John Wilson (born 28 October 1966) is an Australian swimmer. He competed in two events at the 1988 Summer Olympics.
