= Lara Hooiveld =

Australian swimmer

Personal information
- Born: 6 July 1971 (age 54)

Sport
- Sport: Swimming
Medal record
Commonwealth Games
Gold medal – first place	1990 Auckland	4 x 100m medley relay

Lara Maree Hooiveld (born 6 July 1971) is an Australian former swimmer. Hooiveld competed in three events at the 1988 Summer Olympics. Despite being of Australian nationality she won the ASA National British Championships over 100 metres breaststroke in 1990.
