= Donna Procter =

Australian swimmer (born 1969)

Personal information
- Full name: Donna Lee McGovern
- Born: Donna Lee Procter; 16 October 1969 (age 56)
- Spouse: Brett McGovern

Sport
- Sport: Swimming
- Strokes: butterfly, medley

Donna Lee McGovern (née Procter, born 16 October 1969) is a retired Australian butterfly and medley swimmer. She competed in three events at the 1988 Summer Olympics.
