= Thomas Stachewicz =

Australian swimmer

Personal information
- Full name: Thomas Stachewicz
- Nickname: "Tom"
- National team: Australia
- Born: 5 December 1965 (age 60)
- Height: 1.84 m (6 ft 0 in)
- Weight: 79 kg (174 lb)

Sport
- Sport: Swimming
- Strokes: Freestyle, backstroke
Medal record
Men's swimming
Representing Australia
Pan Pacific Swimming Championships
Silver medal – second place	1987 Brisbane	200 m freestyle
Bronze medal – third place	1987 Brisbane	100 m freestyle
Commonwealth Games
Gold medal – first place	1986 Edinburgh	4×200 m freestyle
Gold medal – first place	1990 Auckland	4×100 m freestyle
Gold medal – first place	1990 Auckland	4×200 m freestyle
Bronze medal – third place	1986 Edinburgh	200 m freestyle
Bronze medal – third place	1990 Auckland	200 m freestyle
Bronze medal – third place	1990 Auckland	4×200 m medley

Thomas Stachewicz (born 5 December 1965) is a former freestyle and backstroke swimmer, who represented Australia at three Summer Olympics.

Stachewicz made his Olympic debut in the 1984 Summer Olympics in Los Angeles, where he competed in the heats of the Men's 4×200-metre freestyle relay. The Australian 4×200-metre relay team recorded national records in both the preliminaries and final, finishing with a time of 7 minutes 25.63 seconds, 0.85 of a second behind third place Great Britain. Stachewicz swam the preliminary only at this meet.

At the 1986 Commonwealth Games in Edinburgh, Stachewicz was part of the gold medal-winning men's 4×200-metre freestyle relay team. He also won bronze in the men's 200-metre freestyle.

Later that year he competed in the 1986 World Swimming Championships in Madrid, where he was part of the 4×200-metre freestyle relay team that finished fourth.

In 1987 Stachewicz broke the Commonwealth record in the 200-metre freestyle at the NOK International Championship in East Berlin in a time of 1 minute 49.32 seconds being the first Australian to break the 1 minute 50 second mark.

At 1988 Summer Olympics in Seoul, Stachewicz swam well below his best in the men's 200-metre freestyle heats, qualifying only for the B Final, where he finished 3rd in 1 minute 50.83 seconds. He also competed in the men's 50-metre and 100-metre freestyle events, winning the B Final in the 100-metre freestyle in 50.71 seconds. He led off the relay in the final of the 4×200-metre freestyle relay, recording a personal best of 1 minute 48.99 seconds. This time ranked him second all-time Australian in the 200-metre freestyle behind Duncan Armstrong's world record from earlier in the meet. The Australian team went on to record a national record of 7 minutes 15.23 seconds for their fourth place, 0.88 of a second behind the West German team in the bronze medal position.

At the 1990 Commonwealth Games in Auckland, New Zealand, Stachewicz was a member of the gold medal-winning men's 4×100-metre freestyle relay and 4×200-metre freestyle relay teams. He was also a member of the bronze medal-winning 4×100-metre medley relay team and won an individual bronze in the men's 200-metre freestyle final in a time of 1 minute 49.98 seconds.

In 1991 he competed at the World Swimming Championships in Perth, where he came seventh in the men's 100-metre backstroke.

Stachewicz then competed in the 4×100-metre freestyle and 4×100-metre medley relays at the 1992 Summer Olympics in Barcelona, where the team finished 7th and 8th respectively. He also competed in the men's 100-metre backstroke, finishing 4th in his heat with a time of 57.03 seconds.

He was coach of the Mauritian Olympic team for the 2000 Summer Olympics, and his career since then has included the post of Director of Swimming at All Saints' College, Perth.

In 2009 he was inducted into the Swimming Western Australia Hall of Fame.

== See also ==
- List of Commonwealth Games medallists in swimming (men)
