= Janelle Elford =

Australian swimmer (born 1970)

Janelle Pallister
Personal information
- Full name: Janelle Pallister
- Born: Janelle Elford; 13 February 1970 (age 56)

Sport
- Sport: Swimming
- Strokes: Freestyle
Medal record
Commonwealth Games
Gold medal – first place	1990 Auckland	4 x 200m freestyle relay
Silver medal – second place	1990 Auckland	800 m freestyle
Bronze medal – third place	1990 Auckland	400 m freestyle

Janelle Lynette Pallister (née Elford, born 13 February 1970) is an Australian swimmer and coach. She competed in two events at the 1988 Summer Olympics. At the 1990 Commonwealth Games she won a gold medal.

She is the mother and coach to Owen Pallister and mother and coach of Australian competitive swimmer and lifesaving athlete Lani Pallister.
