= Richard Tapper (swimmer) =

New Zealand swimmer (born 1968)

Richard Findlay Tapper
Personal information
- Born: 14 May 1968 (age 58)
Medal record
Men's swimming
Representing New Zealand
Commonwealth Games
Bronze medal – third place	1990 Auckland	4x200m Freestyle

Richard Findlay Tapper (born 14 May 1968 in Prince Albert, Saskatchewan) is a former New Zealand freestyle swimmer.

Born in Canada, Tapper was based out of Invercargill when he competed for New Zealand at the 1992 Summer Olympics in Barcelona, Spain. He won the bronze medal with the Men's 4x200 Freestyle Relay Team at the 1990 Commonwealth Games in Auckland.

Richard is a general and colorectal surgeon at Christchurch Public Hospital.
