= Karen van Wirdum =

Australian swimmer

Karin van Wirdum
Personal information
- Full name: Karin Tracey van Wirdum
- National team: Australia
- Born: 9 April 1971 (age 55) Brisbane, Queensland
- Height: 1.60 m (5 ft 3 in)
- Weight: 52 kg (115 lb)

Sport
- Sport: Swimming
- Strokes: Freestyle
- Club: Redcliffe Leagues SC
Medal record
Women's swimming
Representing Australia
World Championships (LC)
Silver medal – second place	1991 Perth	4×100 m medley
Pan Pacific Championships
Bronze medal – third place	1987 Brisbane	50 m freestyle
Commonwealth Games
Gold medal – first place	1990 Auckland	100 m freestyle
Gold medal – first place	1990 Auckland	4×100 m freestyle
Gold medal – first place	1990 Auckland	4×100 m medley
Gold medal – first place	1994 Victoria	50 m freestyle
Gold medal – first place	1994 Victoria	4×100 m medley
Silver medal – second place	1990 Auckland	50 m freestyle
Silver medal – second place	1994 Victoria	100 m freestyle
Silver medal – second place	1994 Victoria	4×100 m freestyle

Karin Tracey van Wirdum (born 9 April 1971) is a former freestyle swimmer from Australia, who competed in three consecutive Summer Olympics for her native country, starting in 1988. She won the gold medal in the 100-metre freestyle at the 1990 Commonwealth Games and in the 50-metre freestyle at the 1994 Commonwealth Games.

== See also ==
- List of World Aquatics Championships medalists in swimming (women)
- List of Commonwealth Games medallists in swimming (women)
