= Nick Sanders (swimmer) =

New Zealand swimmer

Personal information
- Full name: Nicholas James Sanders
- Born: 6 February 1971 (age 54); Takapuna, New Zealand

Sport
- Sport: Swimming

Nicholas James Sanders (born 6 February 1971) is a New Zealand swimmer. He competed in four events at the 1992 Summer Olympics.
