= Mark Weldon =

New Zealand swimmer

Mark Rhys Weldon QSO (born 19 September 1967) is a New Zealand businessman and swimmer.

== Education ==
Born in Auckland, Weldon attended high school at Macleans College. Weldon has Bachelor of Commerce, Bachelor of Arts, and Master of Commerce (First Class Hons) degrees from the University of Auckland. From Columbia Law School in New York, Weldon has a Juris Doctor degree, and a diploma in International Law (Hons)

== Career ==
Weldon worked at Skadden, Arps and McKinsey & Company, both in New York City.

Weldon has served as the CEO of NZX Limited (NZX). When Weldon took over NZX, it was a mutual organisation that had nearly been sold to the ASX for a peppercorn. He led the exchange through a demutualization and a listing, leading the organisation for a ten-year period, from 2002 to 2012.

Weldon has given a significant amount of time to public policy in New Zealand. Service includes:

- leading the Prime Minister's Appeal for Christchurch, after the 22 February 2011 earthquake
- chairing the Prime Minister's Job Summit in 2009
- participating on the Capital Markets Development Taskforce in 2009/10; the Tax Working Group in 2009; and the Climate Change Leadership Forum in 2007

From 2012 to 2012 Weldon served on the board of High Performance Sport New Zealand, appointed by the government along with Hamish Carter as independent members to drive an enhanced focus on high performance outcomes in sport. He was previously on the Board of the New Zealand Olympic Committee (2004–2006).

After leaving NZX Weldon invested in the wine industry, buying vineyards on Felton Road, Bannockburn, and establishing the Terra Sancta winery. Terra Sancta was named in the Top 100 Wineries of the World by Wines & Spirits Magazine in 2015.

In 2014, Weldon was appointed as the CEO of MediaWorks New Zealand, managing the company's radio, television and digital businesses. Weldon resigned in May 2016 amidst media controversy over his management decisions and a line of high-profile resignations, saying "the personal cost is now too high to continue in this role".

Weldon has since invested in a number of private companies.

== Sport ==
Weldon represented New Zealand as a swimmer at the 1992 Summer Olympics in Barcelona, in the men's 50 m freestyle and the 4 × 100 m freestyle relay. He also swam for New Zealand at the 1990 Commonwealth Games in Auckland, and won numerous national titles, with national records. Weldon has also won a number of World Masters Swimming Championship titles.

== Honours and awards ==
In 1990, Weldon was awarded the New Zealand 1990 Commemoration Medal. He received a Blake Leader Award in 2005, and a Distinguished Alumni Award from the University of Auckland in 2006. In the 2012 Queen's Birthday and Diamond Jubilee Honours, he was appointed a Companion of the Queen's Service Order, for services to the community and business.
