= Karen Lord (swimmer) =

Australian swimmer

Personal information
- Born: 13 March 1970 (age 56)

Sport
- Sport: Swimming
Medal record
Swimming
Representing Australia
Commonwealth Games
Bronze medal – third place	1990 Auckland	Women's 200m Backstroke

Karen Maree Lord (born 13 March 1970) is an Australian swimmer. She competed in two events at the 1988 Summer Olympics.
