= Aquatics at the 1990 Commonwealth Games =

- Venue: West Auckland Swimming Centre
- Location: Auckland, New Zealand
- Dates: 24 January – 3 February 1990

Aquatics at the 1990 Commonwealth Games was the 14th appearances of both Swimming at the Commonwealth Games and Diving at the Commonwealth Games. It also featured the second appearance of Synchronised swimming at the Commonwealth Games. Competition featured 6 diving events, 32 swimming events and 3 synchronised swimming events, held in Auckland, New Zealand, from 24 January to 3 February 1990.

The events were held at the West Auckland Swimming Centre on Alderman Drive in Henderson. The venue had been specifically built for the Games but faced late issues relating to the 3,200 grandstand seating. It was however described as technologically advanced with a variable floor and movable bulkhead.

Australia topped the aquatics medal table with 24 gold medals.

== Medal table (all aquatics events) ==
* Host nation (New Zealand)

Rank	Nation	Gold	Silver	Bronze	Total
1	Australia	24	20	17	61
2	Canada	13	10	13	36
3	New Zealand*	2	2	4	8
4	England	1	8	7	16
5	Wales	1	0	0	1
6	Zimbabwe	0	1	0	1
Totals (6 entries)		41	41	41	123
