= Swimming at the 1982 Commonwealth Games =

- Venue: Chandler Aquatic Centre
- Location: Brisbane, Australia
- Dates: 30 September to 9 October 1982

Swimming at the 1982 Commonwealth Games was the 12th appearance of Swimming at the Commonwealth Games. Competition featured 29 swimming events, held in Brisbane, Australia, from 30 September to 9 October 1982.

The events at the Games were held at the new Chandler Aquatic Centre that was part of the Sleeman Sports Complex, which had been purpose-built for the games.

Australia topped the medal table with 13 gold medals.

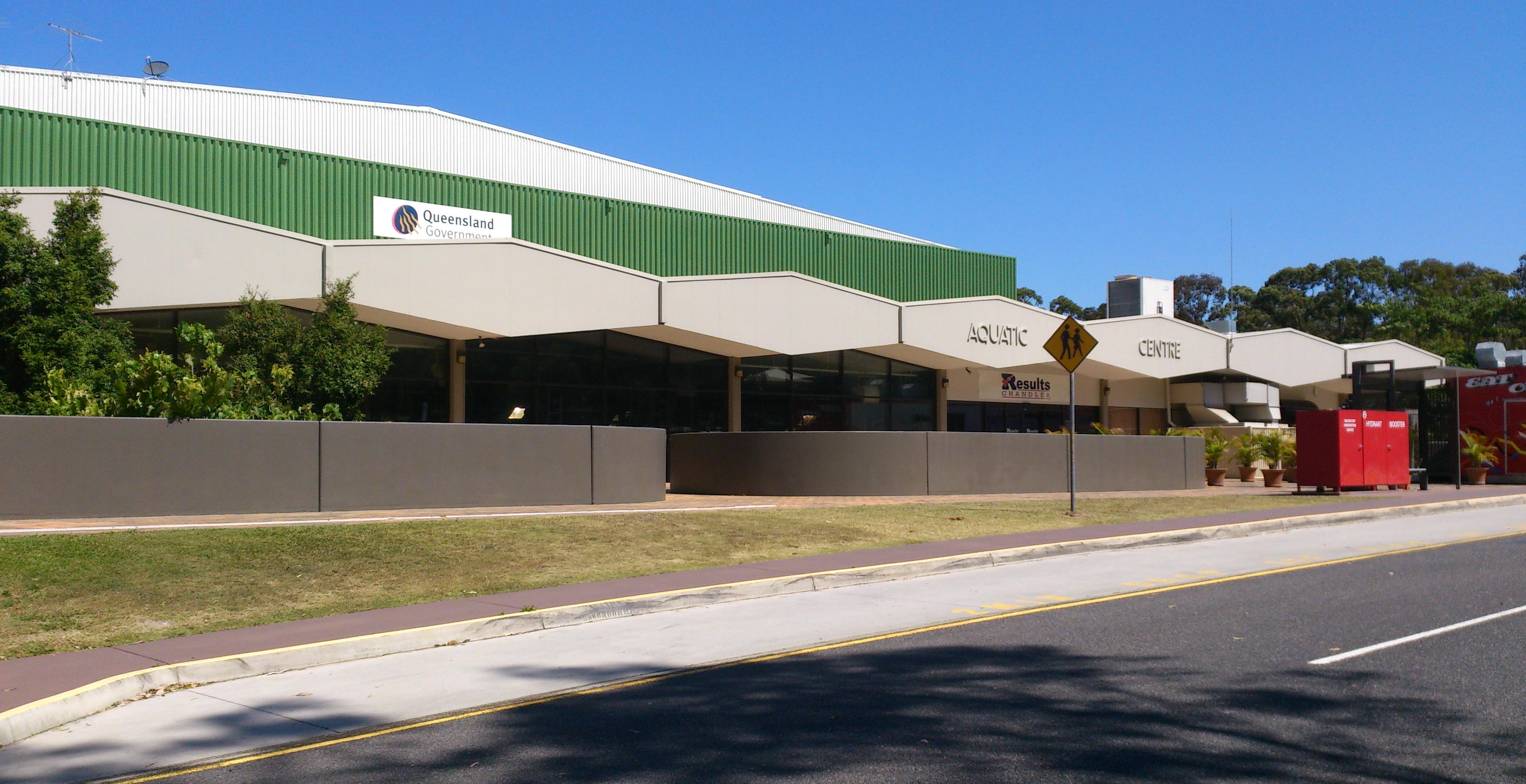
The Aquatic Centre exterior in 2017

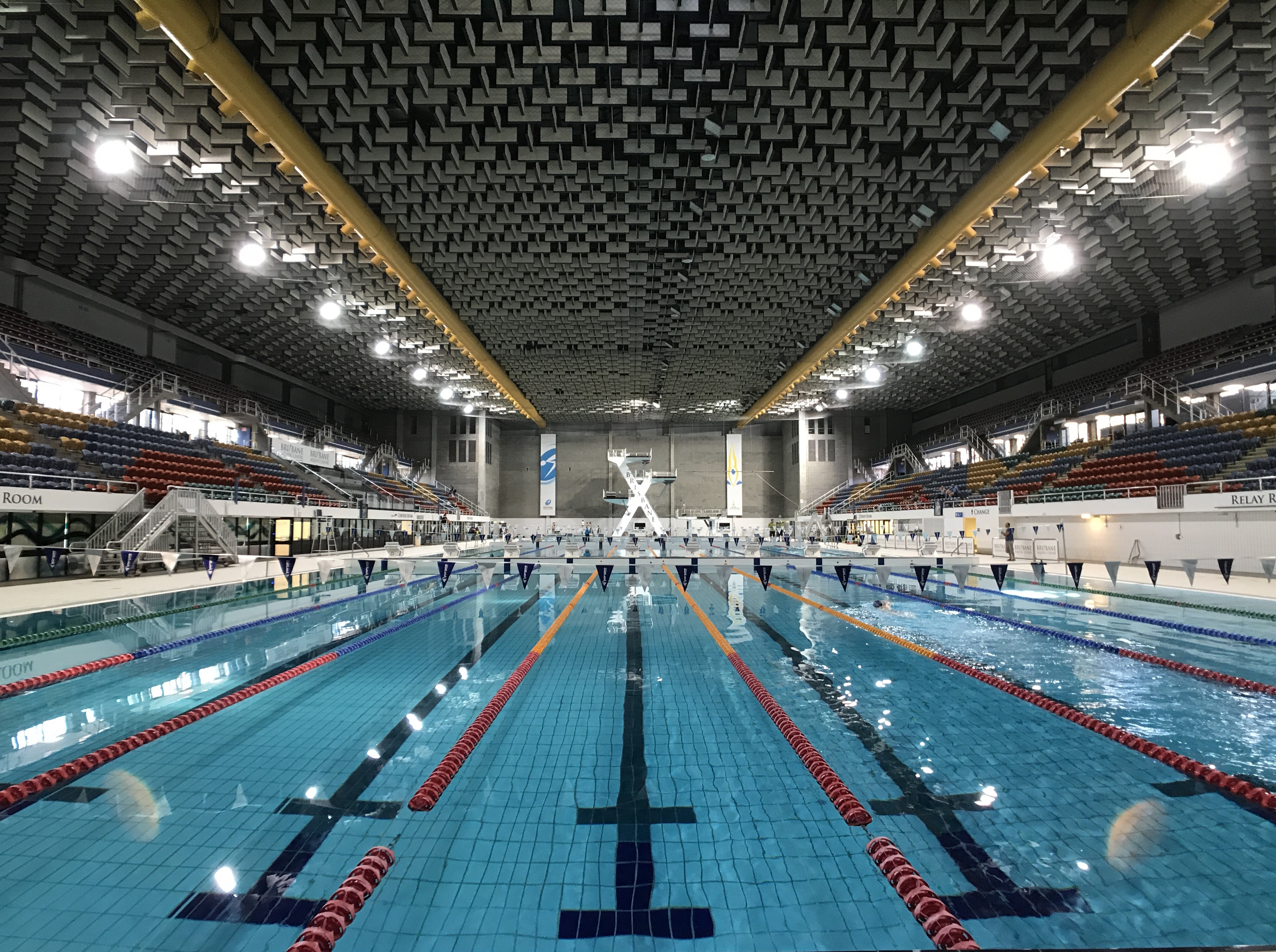
The Brisbane pool in 2017

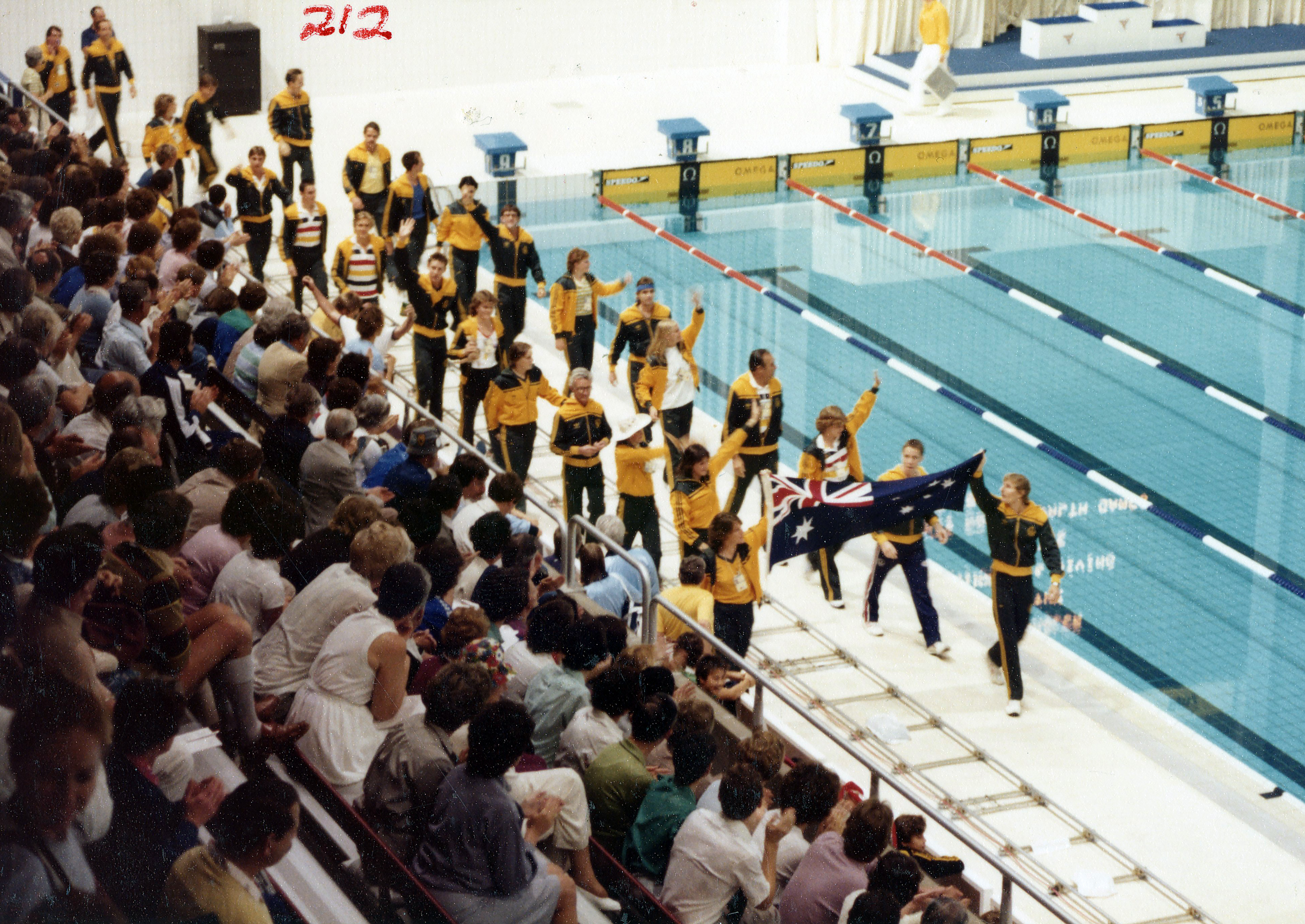
The Australian team enter the centre

== Medal table ==
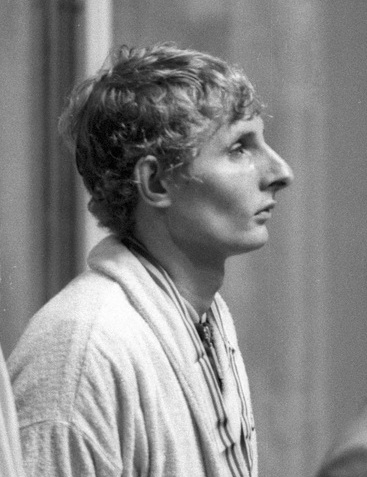
Max Metzker won the 1500 metres freestyle

* Host nation (Australia)

Rank	Nation	Gold	Silver	Bronze	Total
1	Australia*	13	13	8	34
2	Canada	9	7	9	25
3	England	7	7	8	22
4	Scotland	0	2	3	5
5	New Zealand	0	0	1	1
Totals (5 entries)		29	29	29	87

== Medallists ==
Men

Event	Gold	Silver	Bronze
100 m freestyle	Neil Brooks (AUS)	Greg Fasala (AUS)	Michael Delany (AUS)
200 m freestyle	Andrew Astbury (ENG)	Peter Szmidt (CAN)	Ron McKeon (AUS)
400 m freestyle	Andrew Astbury (ENG)	Peter Szmidt (CAN)	John Davey (ENG)
1500 m freestyle	Max Metzker (AUS)	Tim Ford (AUS)	Andrew Astbury (ENG)
100 m backstroke	Mike West (CAN)	Cameron Henning (CAN)	Wade Flemons (CAN)
200 m backstroke	Cameron Henning (CAN)	David Orbell (AUS)	Mike West (CAN)
100 m breaststroke	Adrian Moorhouse (ENG)	Victor Davis (CAN)	Peter Evans (AUS)
200 m breaststroke	Victor Davis (CAN)	Glen Beringen (AUS)	Adrian Moorhouse (ENG)
100 m butterfly	Dan Thompson (CAN)	Phil Hubble (ENG)	Tom Ponting (CAN)
200 m butterfly	Phil Hubble (ENG)	Paul Rowe (AUS)	Jon Sieben (AUS)
200 m individual medley	Alex Baumann (CAN)	Robin Brew (SCO)	Jeffrey Sheehan (CAN)
400 m individual medley	Alex Baumann (CAN)	Steve Poulter (ENG)	John Davey (ENG)
4×100 m freestyle relay	Australia; Greg Fasala; Michael Delany; Graeme Brewer; Neil Brooks	England; David Lowe; Philip Hubble; Philip Osborn; Richard Burrell	Canada; Alex Baumann (51.88); Blair Hicken; Graham Welbourn; Peter Szmidt
4×200 m freestyle relay	Australia; Graeme McGufficke; Ron McKeon; Paul Rowe; Graeme Brewer	England; Philip Osborn; John Davey; Philip Hubble; Andrew Astbury	Scotland; Douglas Campbell; Neil Cochran; Graeme Wilson; Paul Easter
4×100 m medley relay	Australia; David Orbell; Peter Evans; Jon Sieben; Neil Brooks	England; Stephen Harrison; Adrian Moorhouse; Philip Hubble; David Lowe	Scotland; Douglas Campbell; Iain Campbell; William McGoldrick; Paul Easter

Women

Event	Gold	Silver	Bronze
100 m freestyle	June Croft (ENG)	Angela Russell (AUS)	Lisa Curry (AUS)
200 m freestyle	June Croft (ENG)	Tracey Wickham (AUS)	Susie Baumer (AUS)
400 m freestyle	Tracey Wickham (AUS)	Jackie Willmott (ENG)	June Croft (ENG)
800 m freestyle	Tracey Wickham (AUS)	Michelle Ford (AUS)	Jackie Willmott (ENG)
100 m backstroke	Lisa Forrest (AUS)	Georgina Parkes (AUS)	Audrey Moore (AUS)
200 m backstroke	Lisa Forrest (AUS)	Georgina Parkes (AUS)	Cheryl Gibson (CAN)
100 m breaststroke	Kathy Bald (CAN)	Anne Ottenbrite (CAN)	Suki Brownsdon (ENG)
200 m breaststroke	Anne Ottenbrite (CAN)	Kathy Bald (CAN)	Katherine Richardson (CAN)
100 m butterfly	Lisa Curry (AUS)	Janet Tibbits (AUS)	Michelle MacPherson (CAN)
200 m butterfly	Michelle Ford (AUS)	Janet Tibbits (AUS)	Ann Osgerby (ENG)
200 m individual medley	Lisa Curry (AUS)	Cheryl Gibson (CAN)	Michelle Pearson (AUS)
400 m individual medley	Lisa Curry (AUS)	Michelle Pearson (AUS)	Michelle MacPherson (CAN)
4×100 m freestyle relay	England; Debra Gore; Jackie Willmott; June Croft; Nicola Fibbens	Scotland; Alison Hamilton; Cathy Finlay; Nikki Ramsay; Sarah Inkson	New Zealand; Gail Jonson; Kim Dewar; Melanie Jones; Pamela Croad
4×100 m medley relay	Canada; Anne Ottenbrite; Cheryl Gibson; Maureen New; Michelle MacPherson	England; Ann Osgerby; Catherine White; June Croft; Suki Brownsdon	Scotland; Beverley Rose; Cathy Finlay; Nicola Geddes; Nikki Ramsay

== Finals ==
Men

=== 100m freestyle ===
Pos	Athlete	Time
1	(Australia) Neil Brooks	51.14
2	(Australia) Greg Fasala	51.28
3	(Australia) Michael Delany	51.57
4	(Singapore) Peng Ang Siong	51.94
5	(England) David Lowe	51.98
6	(England) Richard Burrell	52.21
7	(Canada) Graham Welbourn	52.61
8	(Canada) Blair Hicken	52.64

=== 200m freestyle ===
Pos	Athlete	Time
1	(England) Andrew Astbury	1:51.52
2	(Canada) Peter Szmidt	1:51.65
3	(Australia) Ron McKeon	1:51.71
4	(Canada) Alex Baumann	1:52.07
5	(Australia) Graeme Brewer	1:52.38
6	(Australia) Graeme Neal McGufficke	1:52.45
7	(Canada) Cameron Henning	1:53.79
8	(Scotland) Doug Campbell	1:53.97

=== 400m freestyle ===
Pos	Athlete	Time
1	(England) Andrew Astbury	3:53.29
2	(Canada) Peter Szmidt	3:53.74
3	(England) John Davey	3:55.52
4	(Australia) Graeme Brewer	3:55.81
5	(Australia) Ron McKeon	3:56.83
6	(Scotland) Paul Easter	3:58.38
7	(Canada) David Shemilt	3:58.47
8	(Australia) Justin Lemberg	3:59.59

=== 1500m freestyle ===
Pos	Athlete	Time
1	(Australia) Max Metzker	15:23.94
2	(Australia) Tim Ford	15:27.00
3	(England) Andrew Astbury	15:34.41
4	(Australia) Wayne Shillington	15:37.50
5	(Canada) David Shemilt	15:42.23
6	(Scotland) Paul Easter	15:47.53
7	(Scotland) Duncan Cruickshank	15:55.06
8	(Canada) Peter Szmidt	15:57.32

=== 100m backstroke ===
Pos	Athlete	Time
1	(Canada) Mike West	57.12
2	(Canada) Cameron Henning	57.82
3	(Canada) Wade Flemons	58.38
4	(England) Stephen Harrison	58.59
5	(Australia) David Orbell	58.68
6	(England) Andy Jameson	58.76
7	(Australia) Matthew Renshaw	59.19
8	(Scotland) Doug Campbell	59.58

=== 200m backstroke ===
Pos	Athlete	Time
1	(Canada) Cameron Henning	2:02.88
2	(Australia) David Orbell	2:03.93
3	(Canada) Mike West	2:04.36
4	(England) Andy Jameson	2:05.95
5	(Scotland) Doug Campbell	2:06.27
6	(Australia) Kim Terrell	2:08.20
7	(Scotland) Neil Cochran	2:09.04
8	(New Zealand) Paul Kingsman	2:10.65

=== 100m breaststroke ===
Pos	Athlete	Time
1	(England) Adrian Moorhouse	1:02.93
2	(Canada) Victor Davis	1:03.18
3	(Australia) Peter Evans	1:03.48
4	(Australia) Stephen Cook	1:04.75
5	(Canada) John Clark	1:05.55
6	(New Zealand) Grant Forbes	1:05.86
7	(Canada) Marco Veilleux	1:06.04
8	(New Zealand) Brett Austin	1:06.62

=== 200m breaststroke ===
Pos	Athlete	Time
1	(Canada) Victor Davis	2:16.25
2	(Australia) Glenn Beringen	2:19.06
3	(England) Adrian Moorhouse	2:19.31
4	(Australia) Peter Evans	2:20.13
5	(Australia) Lindsay Spencer	2:20.17
6	(New Zealand) Mark Kalaugher	2:22.24
7	(Canada) Steve Sproule	2:23.62
8	(Scotland) Iain Campbell	2:24.89

=== 100m butterfly ===
Pos	Athlete	Time
1	(Canada) Dan Thompson	54.71
2	(England) Philip Hubble	55.52
3	(Canada) Tom Ponting	55.64
4	(England) David Lowe	55.67
5	(Australia) Jon Sieben	55.89
6	(Australia) Paul Rowe	56.19
7	(Canada) Lance Schroeder	56.56
8	(Australia) Greg Fasala	57.19

=== 200m butterfly ===
Pos	Athlete	Time
1	(England) Philip Hubble	2:00.98
2	(Australia) Paul Rowe	2:01.18
3	(Australia) Jon Sieben	2:01.24
4	(England) Steve Poulter	2:01.40
5	(Canada) Victor Davis	2:01.74
6	(Canada) Lance Schroeder	2:02.49
7	(New Zealand) Anthony Mosse	2:02.76
8	(Canada) Levente Mady	2:04.38

=== 200m medley ===
Pos	Athlete	Time
1	(Canada) Alex Baumann	2:02.25
2	(Scotland) Robin Brew	2:05.83
3	(Canada) Jeff Sheehan	2:07.14
4	(Canada) Victor Davis	2:07.44
5	(England) John Davey	2:08.05
6	(Australia) Michael Bohl	2:08.72
7	(Australia) Robert Woodhouse	2:10.29
8	(New Zealand) Barry Ray Salisbury	2:11.79

=== 400m medley ===
Pos	Athlete	Time
1	(Canada) Alex Baumann	4:23.53
2	(England) Steve Poulter	4:27.09
3	(England) John Davey	4:27.91
4	(Canada) Cameron Reid	4:29.33
5	(Canada) Peter Dobson	4:29.89
6	(Australia) Matthew Robert Brown	4:30.35
7	(Australia) Justin Lemberg	4:33.62
8	(Australia) Robert Woodhouse	4:37.17

=== 4x100m freestyle relay ===
Pos	Athlete	Time
1	(Australia) Fasala, Delany, Brewer, Brooks	3:24.17
2	(England) Lowe, Hubble, Osborn, Burrell	3:26.98
3	(Canada) Baumann, Hicken, Welbourn, Szmidt	3:27.74
4	(Wales) Adkins, Taylor, Gwilt, Roberts	3:31.98
5	(Scotland) Campbell, Wilson, Easter, Brew	3:33.71
6	(New Zealand) Salisbury, Davidson, Parker, Wells	3:35.50
7	(Hong Kong) Li, Chan, Tsang, Chung	3:46.56
8	(India) Khajan Singh, Chakraborty, Thouba Singh, Cherian	4:08.12

=== 4x200m freestyle relay ===
Pos	Athlete	Time
1	(Australia) McGufficke, McKeon, Rowe, Brewer	7:28.81
2	(England) Osborn, Davey, Hubble, Astbury	7:30.00
3	(Scotland) Campbell, Cochran, Wilson, Easter	7:39.86
4	(New Zealand) Wells, Davidson, Parker, Mosse	7:46.83
5	(Wales) Tony Day, Morris, Perry, Taylor	7:50.21
6	(Canada) Baumann, Henning, Kelly, Szmidt	3:27.74 disq

=== 4x100m medley relay ===
Pos	Athlete	Time
1	(Australia) Orbell, Evans, Sieben, Brooks	3:47.34 mins
2	(England) Harrison, Moorhouse, Hubble, Lowe	3:48.25
3	(Scotland) D. Campbell, I. Campbell, McGoldrick, Easter	3:55.45
4	(Wales) Atkinson, Taylor, Gwilt, Roberts	3:55.49
5	(New Zealand) Mosse, Salisbury, Austin, Kingsman	3:56.58
6	(Hong Kong) Tang, Li, Sang, Leung	4:09.43
7	(India) Khajan Singh, Chakraborty, Thouba Singh, Cherian	4:18.67
8	(Canada) Baumann, Thompson, West, Davis	disq

Women

=== 100m freestyle ===
Pos	Athlete	Time
1	(England) June Croft	56.97
2	(Australia) Angela Russell	57.39
3	(Australia) Lisa Curry	57.68
4	(Australia) Susie Baumer	58.22
5	(Canada) Maureen New	58.32
6	(Canada) Jennifer Campbell	58.60
7	(Canada) Naomi Marubashi	58.68
8	(England) Debra Gore	59.44

=== 200m freestyle ===
Pos	Athlete	Time
1	(England) June Croft	1:59.74
2	(Australia) Tracey Wickham	2:00.60
3	(Australia) Susie Baumer	2:02.29
4	(Australia) Rosemary Brown	2:02.66
5	(Canada) Cheryl McArton	2:03.82
6	(Canada) Julie Daigneault	2:05.45
7	(Scotland) Nikki Ramsay	2:05.69
8	(Scotland) Sarah Inkson	2:06.25

=== 400m freestyle ===
Pos	Athlete	Time
1	(Australia) Tracey Wickham	4:08.82
2	(England) Jackie Willmott	4:13.04
3	(England) June Croft	4:13.13
4	(Australia) Susie Baumer	4:14.66
5	(Australia) Rosemary Brown	4:14.90
6	(Canada) Julie Daigneault	4:19.36
7	(England) Sarah Kerswell	4:22.93
8	(Canada) Cheryl McArton	4:24.15

=== 800m freestyle ===
Pos	Athlete	Time
1	(Australia) Tracey Wickham	8:29.05
2	(Australia) Michelle Ford	8:33.74
3	(England) Jackie Willmott	8:36.66
4	(Canada) Julie Daigneault	8:45.72
5	(England) Sarah Hardcastle	8:51.17
6	(Canada) Cheryl McArton	8:53.45
7	(Australia) Danielle Marie Somerville-Kimlin	8:54.32
8	(Scotland) Alison Hamilton	9:01.31

=== 100m backstroke ===
Pos	Athlete	Time
1	(Australia) Lisa Forrest	1:03.48
2	(Australia) Georgina Parkes	1:03.63
3	(Australia) Audrey Moore	1:03.91
4	(Canada) Cheryl Gibson	1:04.15
5	(Scotland) Beverley Rose	1:04.44
6	(Canada) Reema Abdo	1:05.05
7	(England) Catherine White	1:05.19
8	(England) Helen Jameson	1:05.98

=== 200m backstroke ===
Pos	Athlete	Time
1	(Australia) Lisa Forrest	2:13.46
2	(Australia) Georgina Parkes	2:13.95
3	(Canada) Cheryl Gibson	2:15.87
4	(Australia) Audrey Moore	2:17.85
5	(Canada) Jennifer Campbell	2:19.11
6	(England) Catherine White	2:19.87
7	(Canada) Reema Abdo	2:20.21
8	(Scotland) Beverley Rose	2:20.67

=== 100m breaststroke ===
Pos	Athlete	Time
1	(Canada) Kathy Bald	1:11.89
2	(Canada) Anne Ottenbrite	1:11.99
3	(England) Suki Brownsdon	1:13.76
4	(Canada) Lisa Borsholt	1:13.86
5	(Australia) Cindy-Lu Fitzpatrick	1:14.79
6	(England) Joanne Seymour	1:14.88
7	(Australia) Wendy Anne Bowie	1:15.23
8	(Wales) Claire Tucker	1:15.26

=== 200m breaststroke ===
Pos	Athlete	Time
1	(Canada) Anne Ottenbrite	2:32.07
2	(Canada) Kathy Bald	2:36.06
3	(Canada) Katherine Richardson	2:36.45
4	(England) Suki Brownsdon	2:38.45
5	(England) Gaynor Stanley	2:38.67
6	(Australia) Rickie Danielle Binning	2:39.73
7	(Australia) Cindy-Lu Fitzpatrick	2:41.78
8	(England) Sandra Bowman	2:43.72

=== 100m butterfly ===
Pos	Athlete	Time
1	(Australia) Lisa Curry	1:01.22
2	(Australia) Janet Linda Tibbits	1:01.70
3	(Canada) Michelle MacPherson	1:01.93
4	(Australia) Angela Russell	1:02.40
5	(England) Ann Osgerby	1:02.95
6	(England) Freda Ross	1:03.06
7	(England) Linda Criddle	1:03.27
8	(New Zealand) Megan Tohill	1:05.03

=== 200m butterfly ===
Pos	Athlete	Time
1	(Australia) Michelle Ford	2:11.89
2	(Australia) Janet Tibbits	2:13.18
3	(England) Ann Osgerby	2:13.91
4	(England) Freda Ross	2:15.40
5	(Australia) Susan Jennifer Woodhouse	2:16.16
6	(Canada) Chantel Venne	2:16.72
7	(England) Linda Criddle	2:20.47
8	(Scotland) Cathy Finlay	2:21.85

=== 200m medley ===
Pos	Athlete	Time
1	(Australia) Lisa Curry	2:16.94
2	(Canada) Cheryl Gibson	2:19.91
3	(Australia) Michelle Pearson	2:20.19
4	(Canada) Kathy Bald	2:20.79
5	(Canada) Jennifer Campbell	2:21.71
6	(Australia) Rickie Danielle Binning	2:22.71
7	(England) Louise Tate	2:22.74
8	(Guernsey) Catherine Jackson	2:24.71

=== 400m medley ===
Pos	Athlete	Time
1	(Australia) Lisa Curry	4:51.95
2	(Australia) Michelle Pearson	4:53.73
3	(Canada) Michelle MacPherson	4:55.09
4	(Canada) Cheryl Gibson	4:57.56
5	(Australia) Suzie Landells	4:59.86
6	(England) Sarah Kerswell	5:02.69
7	(England) Sarah Hardcastle	5:04.21
8	(Canada) Katherine Richardson	4:54.39 disq

=== 4x100m freestyle relay ===
Pos	Athlete	Time
1	(England) Gore, Willmott, Croft, Fibbens	3:54.23
2	(Scotland) Hamilton, Finlay, Ramsay, Inkson	4:01.46
3	(New Zealand) Jonson, Dewar, Jones, Croad	4:07.14
4	(Hong Kong) Flink, Wong, Ng, Wai Lai	4:12.73
5	(India) Sood, Anand, Broacha, Madan	4:41.70
6	(Australia) Russell, Baumer, Watts, Curry	disq
7	(Canada) Bald, New, Campbell, Marubashi	disq

=== 4x100m medley relay ===
Pos	Athlete	Time
1	(Canada) Ottenbrite, Gibson, New, MacPherson	4:14.33
2	(England) Osgerby, White, Croft, Brownsdon	4:19.04
3	(Scotland) Rose, Finlay, Geddes, Ramsay	4:25.75
4	(New Zealand) Dewar, Tohill, Croad, Cross	4:33.97
5	(Hong Kong) Ng, Wong, Chow, Flink	4:38.93
6	(India) Sood, Anand, Broacha, Madan	4:59.73
7	(Australia) Russell, Fitzpatrick, Parkes, Curry	4.13.78 disq+

+Russell left the blocks early
