= Australia at the 1982 Commonwealth Games =

- CG code: AUS
- CGA: Australian Commonwealth Games Association
- Website: commonwealthgames.org.au

in Brisbane, Australia
- Competitors: 208 in 11 sports
- Flag bearers: Opening: Rick Mitchell; Closing:Lisa Curry
- Officials: 54
- Medals Ranked 1st: Gold 39 Silver 39 Bronze 29 Total 107

Commonwealth Games appearances (overview)
- 1930; 1934; 1938; 1950; 1954; 1958; 1962; 1966; 1970; 1974; 1978; 1982; 1986; 1990; 1994; 1998; 2002; 2006; 2010; 2014; 2018; 2022; 2026; 2030

Australia hosted the 1982 Commonwealth Games in Brisbane from 30 September to 9 October 1982. It was Australia's third time hosting the Games and twelfth appearance at the Commonwealth Games, having competed at every Games since their inception in 1930. Australia won medals in eleven of the eleven sports that it entered.

== Medalists ==
The following Australian competitors won medals at the games.

Medal	Name	Sport	Event
Gold	Peter Bourke	Athletics	Men's 800 metres
Gold	Rob de Castella	Athletics	Men's marathon
Gold	Garry Brown	Athletics	Men's 400 metres hurdles
Gold	Ray Boyd	Athletics	Men's pole vault
Gold	Gary Honey	Athletics	Men's long jump
Gold	Raelene Boyle	Athletics	Women's 400 metres
Gold	Debbie Flintoff	Athletics	Women's 400 metres hurdles
Gold	Sue Howland	Athletics	Women's javelin throw
Gold	Glynis Nunn	Athletics	Women's heptathlon
Gold	Michael Turtur	Cycling	Men's 4000m individual pursuit
Gold	Kenrick Tucker	Cycling	Men's sprint
Gold	Gary West; Kevin Nichols; Michael Grenda; Michael Turtur	Cycling	Men's 4000m team pursuit
Gold	Kevin Nichols	Cycling	Men's 10 mile scratch race
Gold	Jenny Donnet	Diving	Women's 3 metres springboard
Gold	Valerie Beddoe	Diving	Women's 10 metres platform
Gold	Rob Dobbins; Keith Poole; Bert Sharp; Don Sherman	Lawn bowls	Men's fours
Gold	Phil Adams; John Tremelling	Shooting	Men's free pistol – Pairs
Gold	Phil Adams; Gregory Colber	Shooting	Men's air pistol – Pairs
Gold	Noel Ryan; Alexander Taransky	Shooting	Men's centre-fire pistol – Pairs
Gold	Peter Heuke; Alexander Taransky	Shooting	Men's rapid-fire pistol – Pairs
Gold	Keith Affleck; Geoffrey Ayling	Shooting	Men's small bore rifle, prone
Gold	Alan Smith; John Tremelling	Shooting	Men's full bore rifle – Pairs
Gold	Jim Ellis; Terry Rumbel	Shooting	Men's trap – Pairs
Gold	Neil Brooks	Swimming	Men's 100 metres freestyle
Gold	Max Metzker	Swimming	Men's 1500 metres freestyle
Gold	Greg Fasala; Michael Delany; Graeme Brewer; Neil Brooks	Swimming	Men's 4 x 100 metres freestyle
Gold	Graeme McGufficke; Ron McKeon; Paul Rowe; Graeme Brewer	Swimming	Men's 4 x 200 metres freestyle
Gold	David Orbell; Peter Evans; Jon Sieben; Neil Brooks	Swimming	Men's 4 x 100 metres medley
Gold	Tracey Wickham	Swimming	Women's 400 metres freestyle
Gold	Tracey Wickham	Swimming	Women's 800 metres freestyle
Gold	Lisa Forrest	Swimming	Women's 100 metres backstroke
Gold	Lisa Forrest	Swimming	Women's 200 metres backstroke
Gold	Lisa Curry	Swimming	Women's 100 metres butterfly
Gold	Michelle Ford	Swimming	Women's 200 metres butterfly
Gold	Lisa Curry	Swimming	Women's 200 metres individual medley
Gold	Lisa Curry	Swimming	Women's 400 metres individual medley
Gold	Nick Voukelatos	Weightlifting	Men's flyweight
Gold	Robert Kabbas	Weightlifting	Men's middle heavyweight
Gold	Dean Lukin	Weightlifting	Men's super heavyweight
Silver	Rick Mitchell	Athletics	Men's 400 metres
Silver	Gary Minihan; John Fleming; Greg Parker; Rick Mitchell	Athletics	Men's 4 x 400 metres
Silver	Ken Lorraway	Athletics	Men's triple jump
Silver	Leanne Evans; Denise Boyd; Debbie Flintoff; Raelene Boyle	Athletics	Women's 4 x 400 metres
Silver	Christine Stanton	Athletics	Women's high jump
Silver	Robyn Strong	Athletics	Women's long jump
Silver	Gael Mulhall	Athletics	Women's shot put
Silver	Gael Mulhall	Athletics	Women's discus throw
Silver	Petra Rivers	Athletics	Women's javelin throw
Silver	Douglas Sam	Boxing	Men's middleweight
Silver	John Watters; Remo Sansonetti; Ricky Flood; Michael Lynch	Cycling	Men's team trial
Silver	Chris Wilson	Cycling	Men's individual time trial
Silver	Gary Hammond	Cycling	Men's 10 mile scratch race
Silver	Steve Foley	Diving	Men's 3 metres springboard
Silver	Steve Foley	Diving	Men's 10 metres platform
Silver	Robert Parrella	Lawn bowls	Men's singles
Silver	Phil Adams	Shooting	Men's air pistol
Silver	Terry Rumbel	Shooting	Men's trap
Silver	Ian Hale	Shooting	Men's skeet
Silver	Greg Fasala	Swimming	Men's 100 metres freestyle
Silver	Tim Ford	Swimming	Men's 1500 metres freestyle
Silver	David Orbell	Swimming	Men's 200 metres backstroke
Silver	Glen Beringen	Swimming	Men's 200 metres breaststroke
Silver	Paul Rowe	Swimming	Men's 200 metres butterfly
Silver	Angela Russell	Swimming	Women's 100 metres freestyle
Silver	Tracey Wickham	Swimming	Women's 200 metres freestyle
Silver	Michelle Ford	Swimming	Women's 800 metres freestyle
Silver	Georgina Parkes	Swimming	Women's 100 metres backstroke
Silver	Georgina Parkes	Swimming	Women's 200 metres backstroke
Silver	Janet Tibbits	Swimming	Women's 100 metres butterfly
Silver	Janet Tibbits	Swimming	Women's 200 metres butterfly
Silver	Michelle Pearson	Swimming	Women's 400 metres individual medley
Silver	Bill Stellios	Weightlifting	Men's lightweight
Silver	Tony Pignone	Weightlifting	Men's middleweight
Silver	Joe Kabalan	Weightlifting	Men's heavyweight
Silver	Bob Edmond	Weightlifting	Men's Super heavyweight
Silver	Cris Brown	Wrestling	Men's featherweight
Silver	Zsigmund Kelevitz	Wrestling	Men's lightweight
Silver	Wally Koenig	Wrestling	Men's middleweight
Bronze	Michael Coen	Archery	Men's event
Bronze	Gary Minihan	Athletics	Men's 400 metres
Bronze	Don Wright	Athletics	Men's 110 metres hurdles
Bronze	Colleen Pekin	Athletics	Women's 100 metres
Bronze	Heather Barralet	Athletics	Women's 800 metres
Bronze	Jenny Cunningham; Maxine Evans; Jane Forrest; Audrey Swaby; Mark Harry; Paul Morgan; Trevor James; Mark Scandolera	Badminton	MixedTeam
Bronze	Grant Richards	Boxing	Men's flyweight
Bronze	Richard Reilly	Boxing	Men's bantamweight
Bronze	Rodney Harberger	Boxing	Men's featherweight
Bronze	Brian Tink	Boxing	Men's lightweight
Bronze	Michael Turtur	Cycling	Men's 10 mile scratch race
Bronze	Valerie Beddoe	Diving	Women's 3 metres springboard
Bronze	Denis Dalton; Peter Rheuben	Lawn bowls	Men's pairs
Bronze	Phil Adams	Shooting	Men's free pistol
Bronze	Noel Ryan	Shooting	Men's centre-fire pistol
Bronze	Norbert Jahn; Anton Wurfel	Shooting	Men's air rifle – Pairs
Bronze	Alex Crikis; Ian Hale	Shooting	Men's skeet- Pairs
Bronze	Michael Delany	Swimming	Men's 100 metres freestyle
Bronze	Ron McKeon	Swimming	Men's 200 metres freestyle
Bronze	Peter Evans	Swimming	Men's 100 metres breaststroke
Bronze	Jon Sieben	Swimming	Men's 200 metres butterfly
Bronze	Lisa Curry	Swimming	Women's 100 metres freestyle
Bronze	Susie Baumer	Swimming	Women's 200 metres freestyle
Bronze	Audrey Moore	Swimming	Women's 100 metres backstroke
Bronze	Michelle Pearson	Swimming	Women's 200 metres individual medley
Bronze	Lorenzo Orsini	Weightlifting	Men's bantamweight
Bronze	Mike Sabljak	Weightlifting	Men's middle heavyweight
Bronze	Ken Hoyt	Wrestling	Men's flyweight
Bronze	Murray Avery	Wrestling	Men's heavyweight

Medals by sport
Sport	1st place, gold medalist(s)	2nd place, silver medalist(s)	3rd place, bronze medalist(s)	
Swimming	13	13	8	34
Athletics	9	9	4	22
Shooting	7	3	4	14
Cycling	4	3	1	8
Weightlifting	3	4	2	9
Diving	2	2	1	5
Lawn bowls	1	1	1	3
Wrestling	0	3	2	5
Boxing	0	1	4	5
Archery	0	0	1	1
Badminton	0	0	1	1
Total	39	39	29	107

== Officials ==
General Manager – James Barry
Manageress – Marjorie Nelson
Assistant Managers – Will Hoffman, Sol Spitalnic
Administrayive Officer – Bob Hemery
Office Assistants – Jeanette Brown, Anne Marie Harrison
Attache – Edward Thomson
Medical – Team Doctors – Dr Christopher Gale, DR Anthony Millar, Physiotherapist – Thomas Dobson, Masseur – Michael Kewley
Section Officials – Archer Manager – Russell Barter, Achery Coach – Gordon Pawson; Athletics Manager – Wendy Ey, Assistant Managers – William Kitt, Margaret Mahoney, Coaches – Anthony Rice, Jean Roberts, Neville Sillitoe, Pamela Turney, Physiotherapist – Peter Duras, Masseur – Frederick Warwick; Badminton Manager – Don Stockins, Coach – Joy Twining; Lawn Bowls Manager – Edward Singleton, Coach – Clarence Watkins; Boxing Manager/Trainer – Paul Thompson, Assistant Trainer – Barry Parnell; Cycling Manager – Ray Godkin, Track Coach – Charlie Walsh, Road Coach – Alexander Fulcher, Mechanic – John Beasley; Shooting Manager – Peter Anderson, Coach – Tibor Gonczol, Assistant Coach – Donald Jones; Swimming Manager – Geoffrey Hare, Assistant Managers – Dr Diana Bendeich, Margaret Cain, Head Coach – Terry Buck, Coaches – Joe King, Lawrie Lawrence, John Rodgers, Bill Sweetenham, Ken Wood; Diving Manager – Col Hanlin, Coach – Peter Panayi; Weightlifting Manager – Ronald Nylander, Coaches – Paul Coffa, Bruce Walsh; Wrestling Manager – James Sinclair, Coach – Samuel Parker, Assistant Coach – Raymond Barry

== See also ==
- Australia at the 1980 Summer Olympics
- Australia at the 1984 Summer Olympics
