= Canada at the 1982 Commonwealth Games =

- CG code: CAN
- CGA: Commonwealth Games Canada
- Website: commonwealthgames.ca

in Brisbane, Australia
- Medals Ranked 3rd: Gold 26 Silver 23 Bronze 33 Total 82

Commonwealth Games appearances (overview)
- 1930; 1934; 1938; 1950; 1954; 1958; 1962; 1966; 1970; 1974; 1978; 1982; 1986; 1990; 1994; 1998; 2002; 2006; 2010; 2014; 2018; 2022; 2026; 2030

Other related appearances
- Newfoundland (1930, 1934)

Canada took part at the 1982 Commonwealth Games in Brisbane (Australia). With a total of 82 medals, Canada ranked third on the medal tally.

== Medals ==
Nation	(gold)	(silver)	(bronze)	Total
Canada	26	23	33	82

== Medallists ==
=== Gold medallists ===
Athletics:

- Mark McKoy, Men's 100 Metres Hurdles
- Milton Ottey, Men's High Jump
- Bruno Pauletto, Men's Shot Put
- Angella Taylor, Women's 100 Metres
- Debbie Brill, Women's High Jump
- Women's 4x400 Metres Relay team

Badminton:

- Women's double team

Boxing:

- Willie de Wit, Men's Heavyweight
- Shawn O'Sullivan, Men's Middleweight

Shooting:

- Thomas (Tom) Guinn, Men's 50 Metres Pistol Free
- Jean-Francois Sénécal, Men's Air Rifle
- Men's Skeet team

Swimming:

- Mike West, Men's 100m Backstroke
- Dan Thompson, Men's 100m Butterfly
- Cameron Henning, Men's 200m Backstroke
- Victor Davis, Men's 200m Breaststroke
- Alex Baumann, Men's 200m Individual Medley
- Alex Baumann, Men's 400m Individual Medley
- Kathy Bald, Women's 100m Breaststroke
- Anne Ottenbrite, Women's 200m Breaststroke
- Women's 4x100m Medley Relay team

Wrestling:

- Bob Robinson, Men's Featherweight Division
- Richard Deschatelets, Men's Heavyweight Division
- Wyatt Wishart, Men's Heavyweight Plus Division
- Clark Davis, Men's Light Heavyweight Division
- Chris Rinke, Men's Middleweight Division

=== Silver medallists ===
Archery:

- Men's F.I.T.A. Double

Athletics:

- Ben Johnson, Men's 100 Metres
- Men's 4x100m Relay team
- Rob Gray, Men's Discus Throw
- Laslo Babits, Men's Javelin
- Dave Steen, Men's Decathlon
- Marcel Jobin, Men's 30 km Road Walk
- Men's 4x100m Relay

Badminton:

- Team Event (mixed)

Cycling:

- Steven Todd Bauer, Men's Road Race (185 km)

Diving:

- Sylvie Bernier, Women's 3m Springboard Diving
- Jennifer McArton, Women's High Diving/Tower

Shooting:

- Jim Timmerman, Men's Rapid Fire Pistol
- Men's Smallbore Rifle 3 Positions (team)

Swimming:

- Cameron Henning, Men's 100m Backstroke
- Victor Davis, Men's 100m Breaststroke
- Peter Szmidt, Men's 200m Freestyle
- Peter Szmidt, Men's 400m Freestyle
- Anne Ottenbrite, Women's 100m Breaststroke
- Kathy Bald, Women's 200m Breaststroke
- Cheryl Gibson, Women's 200m Individual Medley

Weightlifting:

- Guy Greavette, Men's 82.5 kg Combined

Wrestling:

- Raymond Takahashi, Men's Flyweight Division

=== Bronze medallists ===
Archery:

- Women's F.I.T.A. Double

Athletics:

- Gregory Duhaime, Men's 3000 m Steeplechase
- Guillaume Leblanc, Men's 30 km Road Walk
- Zbigniew Dolegiewicz, Men's Discus Throw
- Lubomir Chambul, Men's Shot Put
- Susan Kemel, Women's 100 Metres Hurdles
- Angella Taylor, Women's 200 Metres
- Jill Ross, Women's Heptathlon
- Rosemary Hauch, Women's Shot Put

Badminton:

- Men's Double

Boxing:

- Kevin McDermott, Men's Middleweight

Cycling:

- Alex Stieda, Men's 4000m Individual Pursuit

Diving:

- John Nash, Men's High Diving/Tower
- Kathy Kelemen, Women's High Diving/Tower

Shooting:

- Thomas (Tom) Guinn, Men's Air Pistol
- Men's Air Pistol (team)
- Guy Lorion, Men's Smallbore Rifle 3 Position
- Men's Smallbore Rifle Prone (team)

Swimming:

- Wade Flemons, Men's 100m Backstroke
- Tom Ponting, Men's 100m Butterfly
- Michelle MacPherson, Women's 100m Butterfly
- Michael West, Men's 200m Backstroke
- Cheryl Gibson, Women's 200m Backstroke
- Katherine Richardson, Women's 200m Breaststroke
- Jeffrey Sheehan, Men's 200m Individual Medley
- Michelle MacPherson, Women's 400m Individual Medley
- Men's 4x100m Freestyle Relay team

Weightlifting:

- Kevin Roy, Men's 100 kg Combined
- Mario Leblanc, Men's 110 kg Combined
- Jacques Demers, Men's 75 kg Combined

Wrestling:

- Maldwyn Cooper, Men's Light Flyweight Division
- Lloyd Renken, Men's Lightweight Division
- Brian Renken, Men's Welterweight Division
