= Swimming at the 1984 Summer Olympics – Women's 200 metre backstroke =

Women's 200 metre backstroke at the Games of the XXIII Olympiad
- Venue: McDonald's Olympic Swim Stadium
- Date: 4 August 1984 (heats & final)
- Competitors: 29 from 19 nations
- Winning time: 2:12.38 NR

Medalists
1st place, gold medalist(s)		Jolanda de Rover	Netherlands
2nd place, silver medalist(s)		Amy White	United States
3rd place, bronze medalist(s)		Anca Pătrășcoiu	Romania

The final of the women's 200 metre backstroke event at the 1984 Summer Olympics was held in the McDonald's Olympic Swim Stadium in Los Angeles, California, on August 4, 1984.

== Records ==
Prior to this competition, the existing world and Olympic records were as follows.

World record	Cornelia Sirch (GDR)	2:09.91	Guayaquil, Ecuador	8 August 1982
Olympic record	Rica Reinisch (GDR)	2:11.77	Moscow, Soviet Union	27 July 1980

== Results ==
=== Heats ===
Rule: The eight fastest swimmers advance to final A (Q), while the next eight to final B (q).

Rank	Heat	Lane	Name	Nationality	Time	Notes
1	2	4	Jolanda de Rover	Netherlands	2:13.50	Q
2	1	4	Georgina Parkes	Australia	2:14.89	Q
3	4	5	Amy White	United States	2:15.40	Q
4	2	5	Svenja Schlicht	West Germany	2:15.69	Q
5	3	5	Tori Trees	United States	2:16.23	Q
6	3	4	Carmen Bunaciu	Romania	2:16.41	Q
7	4	4	Anca Pătrășcoiu	Romania	2:16.71	Q
8	2	7	Carmel Clark	New Zealand	2:16.78	Q, NR
9	2	6	Catherine White	Great Britain	2:18.02	q
10	1	5	Yolande van der Straeten	Belgium	2:18.49	q
11	3	2	Naomi Sekido	Japan	2:18.52	q
12	4	3	Katherine Read	Great Britain	2:18.92	q
13	2	3	Reema Abdo	Canada	2:19.05	q
14	4	6	Sandra Dahlmann	West Germany	2:19.59	q
15	4	7	Sofia Kraft	Sweden	2:19.73	q
16	3	3	Audrey Moore	Australia	2:20.12	q
17	3	6	Brigitte van der Lans	Netherlands	2:20.63	
18	1	3	Sabine Pauwels	Belgium	2:21.36	
19	4	2	Melinda Copp	Canada	2:21.39	
20	2	2	Teresa Rivera	Mexico	2:22.94	
21	4	1	Choi Yun-hui	South Korea	2:23.80	
22	3	7	Nozomi Sunouchi	Japan	2:25.05	
23	1	6	Manuela Carosi	Italy	2:25.45	
24	1	7	Eva Gysling	Switzerland	2:25.69	
25	2	1	Lotta Flink	Hong Kong	2:29.00	
26	3	1	Yan Hong	China	2:32.33	
27	1	1	Christine Jacob	Philippines	2:32.91	
	1	2	Lise Lotte Nylund	Norway	DNS	
	4	8	Kathy Wong	Hong Kong	DNS	

=== Finals ===
==== Final B ====
Rank	Lane	Name	Nationality	Time	Notes
9	7	Sandra Dahlmann	West Germany	2:16.93	
10	4	Catherine White	Great Britain	2:17.63	
11	6	Katherine Read	Great Britain	2:18.33	
12	2	Reema Abdo	Canada	2:18.50	
13	5	Yolande van der Straeten	Belgium	2:18.63	
14	3	Naomi Sekido	Japan	2:18.87	
15	1	Sofia Kraft	Sweden	2:19.37	
16	8	Audrey Moore	Australia	2:21.36	

==== Final A ====
Rank	Lane	Name	Nationality	Time	Notes
1st place, gold medalist(s)	4	Jolanda de Rover	Netherlands	2:12.38	NR
2nd place, silver medalist(s)	3	Amy White	United States	2:13.04	
3rd place, bronze medalist(s)	1	Anca Pătrășcoiu	Romania	2:13.29	
4	5	Georgina Parkes	Australia	2:14.37	
5	2	Tori Trees	United States	2:15.73	
6	6	Svenja Schlicht	West Germany	2:15.93	
7	7	Carmen Bunaciu	Romania	2:16.15	
8	8	Carmel Clark	New Zealand	2:17.89	
