= 1985 Australian Swimming Championships =

The 1985 Australian Swimming Championships were held at the Melbourne State Swimming Centre from Thursday 21 February to Sunday 24 February. They were organised by Amateur Swimming Union of Australia.

== Medal winners ==
=== Men's events ===
Event	Gold		Silver		Bronze	
50 m freestyle	Greg Fasala; Nautilus (Vic)	23.27	Neil Brooks; City of Perth (WA)	23.29	Mark Stockwell; St. Peters (Qld)	23.42
100 m freestyle	Mark Stockwell; St. Peters (Qld); Neil Brooks; City of Perth (WA)	51.12			Matthew Renshaw; Knox (NSW)	51.69
200 m freestyle	Thomas Stachewicz; Beatty Park (WA)	1:51.48	Anthony McDonald; Beatty Park (WA)	1:54.80	Michael Bruce McKenzie; Carina Chandler (Qld)	1:54.86
400 m freestyle	Michael Bruce McKenzie; Carina Chandler (Qld)	3:59.04	Jason Plummer; St. Peters (Qld)	4:00.89	Scott Hamlet; St. Bernadette's (Qld)	4:01.27
800 m freestyle	Michael Bruce McKenzie; Carina Chandler (Qld)	8:11.42	Jason Plummer; St. Peters (Qld)	8:20.86	Stephen Cameron; Parkes (NSW)	8:25.31
1500 m freestyle	Michael Bruce McKenzie; Carina Chandler (Qld)	15:38.84	Jason Plummer; St. Peters (Qld)	15:57.99	Stephen Cameron; Parkes (NSW)	16:06.85
50 m backstroke	Paul Kingsman; Roskill (NZ)	27.54; ACR	Kim Terrell; CIG Burley Griffin (ACT)	27.65; AR	Neil Brooks; City of Perth (WA)	27.66
100 m backstroke	Paul Kingsman; Roskill (NZ)	58.05	Thomas Stachewicz; Beatty Park (WA)	58.73	Matthew Renshaw; Knox (NSW)	58.84
200 m backstroke	Paul Kingsman; Roskill (NZ)	2:04.81	Rob Woodhouse; Melbourne Aquatic (Vic)	2:06.01	Kim Terrell; CIG Burley Griffin (ACT)	2:06.26
50 m breaststroke	Brett Stocks; Leander (Qld)	29.53; AR	Lance Leech; Leander (Qld)	29.62	Greg Fasala; Nautilus (Vic)	30.19
100 m breaststroke	Brett Stocks; Leander (Qld)	1:03.89	Lance Leech; Leander (Qld)	1:05.11	Glenn Beringen; Marion (SA)	1:05.16
200 m breaststroke	Glenn Beringen; Marion (SA)	2:20.71	Lance Leech; Leander (Qld)	2:20.80	Jonathan Barrett; ACI Vicentre (Vic)	2:23.73
50 m butterfly	Barry Armstrong; Carine (WA)	25.37; AR	Greg Fasala; Nautilus (Vic)	25.63	Michael Delany; Carlile (NSW)	25.83
100 m butterfly	Barry Armstrong; Carine (WA)	54.69; ACR	Anthony McDonald; Beatty Park (WA)	55.37	Paul Rowe; CIG Burley Griffin (ACT)	57.03
200 m butterfly	Anthony McDonald; Beatty Park (WA)	1:59.36; ACR	Ralph Taylor; Carina Chandler (Qld)	2:03.69	Peter Gee; CIG Burley Griffin (ACT)	2:04.03
200 m individual medley	Rob Woodhouse; Melbourne Aquatic (Vic)	2:06.58	Anthony McDonald; Beatty Park (WA)	2:06.81	Paul Lee; Victoria Park Carlisle (WA)	2:08.86
400 m individual medley	Rob Woodhouse; Melbourne Aquatic (Vic)	4:28.82	Paul Lee; Victoria Park Carlisle (WA)	4:32.72	Steven Clarke; Leander (Qld)	4:32.75
4 × 100 m state freestyle relay	Western Australia; Tom Stachewicz; Paul Lee; Barry Armstrong; Neil Brooks	3:32.68	Queensland	3:35.82	New South Wales	3:36.84
4 × 200 m state freestyle relay	New South Wales	7:50.54	Queensland	8:00.15	Victoria	8:10.50
4 × 100 m state medley relay	Western Australia	3:55.07	Victoria	3:55.77	New Zealand	3:57.12
4 × 100 m club freestyle relay	Knox A (NSW)	3:31.12	Beatty Park (WA)	3:36.19	CIG Burley Griffin A (ACT)	3:37.86
4 × 200 m club freestyle relay	CIG Burley Griffin A (ACT)	7:50.08	St. Peters (Qld)	7:55.35	Knox A (NSW)	7:56.56
4 × 100 m club medley relay	Knox (NSW)	3:55.56	ACI Vicentre (Vic)	3:59.15	Marion (SA)	4:00.09

Legend: AR – Australian record; ACR – Australian All Comers record

=== Women's events ===
Event	Gold		Silver		Bronze	
50 m freestyle	Angela Russell; Commercial (Qld)	26.73	Jenny Messenger; Marion (SA)	26.74	Julie Pugh; St. Bernadette's (Qld)	27.29
100 m freestyle	Sarah Thorpe; Beatty Park (WA)	58.21	Michelle Pearson; CIG Burley Griffin (ACT)	58.34	Jenny Messenger; Marion (SA)	58.35
200 m freestyle	Jenni Burke; ACI Lawrence (Qld)	2:03.19	Anna McVann; ACI Burnside Southside (SA)	2:03.74	Donna Procter; Hunter (NSW)	2:06.09
400 m freestyle	Anna McVann; ACI Burnside Southside (SA)	4:13.54	Donna Procter; Hunter (NSW)	4:17.22	Jenni Burke; ACI Lawrence (Qld)	4:18.43
800 m freestyle	Anna McVann; ACI Burnside Southside (SA)	8:37.85	Donna Procter; Hunter (NSW)	8:45.95	Trudy Housman; CQ Aquajets (Qld)	8:48.48
1500 m freestyle	Anna McVann; ACI Burnside Southside (SA)	16:19.44	Dianna Bova; Maroubra (NSW)	16:57.24	Tabithia Andriunas; St. Bernadette's (Qld)	17:05.45
50 m backstroke	Kim Gasch; Freeway Waterlions (Vic)	30.22; AR	Angela Russell; Commercial (Qld)	30.59	Georgina Parkes; St. Peters (Qld)	30.89
100 m backstroke	Georgina Parkes; St. Peters (Qld)	1:05.40	Nicole Livingstone; ACI Vicentre (Vic)	1:05.44	Lauren Wilkinson; Jones (NSW)	1:05.83
200 m backstroke	Georgina Parkes; St. Peters (Qld)	2:16.53	Lauren Wilkinson; Jones (NSW)	2:19.28	Nicole Livingstone; ACI Vicentre (Vic)	2:20.43
50 m breaststroke	Dimity Douglas; CIG Burley Griffin (ACT)	33.33; AR	Claudia Dullo; Wales (NSW)	33.37	Cindy-Lu Fitzpatrick; Leander (Qld)	34.29
100 m breaststroke	Dimity Douglas; CIG Burley Griffin (ACT)	1:12.85	Claudia Dullo; Wales (NSW)	1:13.07	Cindy-Lu Fitzpatrick; Leander (Qld)	1:14.34
200 m breaststroke	Dimity Douglas; CIG Burley Griffin (ACT)	2:35.95	Cindy-Lu Fitzpatrick; Leander (Qld)	2:36.06	Joanne Earle; Rockdale (NSW)	2:39.50
50 m butterfly	Angela Russell; Commercial (Qld)	28.65; AR	Janet Tibbits; Leander (Qld)	28.66	Fiona Alessandri; Beatty Park (WA)	29.12
100 m butterfly	Janet Tibbits; Leander (Qld)	1:01.70	Celina Hardy; Wales (NSW)	1:03.07	Joy Celotti; ACI Vicentre (Vic)	1:03.89
200 m butterfly	Janet Tibbits; Leander (Qld)	2:14.40	Celina Hardy; Wales (NSW)	2:14.82	Julie West; St. Bernadette's (Qld)	2:15.21
200 m individual medley	Michelle Pearson; CIG Burley Griffin (ACT)	2:19.12	Celina Hardy; Wales (NSW)	2:20.91	Suzie Landells; Leander (Qld)	2:22.94
400 m individual medley	Anna McVann; ACI Burnside Southside (SA)	4:51.85; ACR	Celina Hardy; Wales (NSW)	4:55.04	Julie West; St. Bernadette's (Qld)	4:58.97
4 × 100 m state freestyle relay	Queensland	3:58.02	New South Wales	3:58.14	Victoria	4:07.00
4 × 200 m state freestyle relay	Queensland	8:28.37	New South Wales	8:29.92	Victoria	9:05.80
4 × 100 m state medley relay	Queensland	4:20.06	New South Wales	4:25.35	Victoria	4:30.85
4 × 100 m club freestyle relay	St. Bernadette's (Qld)	3:57.73	CIG Burley Griffin A (ACT)	3:59.29	ACI Burnside Southside (SA)	4:01.41
4 × 200 m club freestyle relay	CIG Burley Griffin A (ACT)	8:31.24	Hunter (NSW)	8:31.75	St. Bernadette's (Qld)	8:33.31
4 × 100 m club medley relay	CIG Burley Griffin A (ACT)	4:24.48	Leander (Qld)	4:25.42	Marion (SA)	4:31.19

Legend: AR – Australian record; ACR – Australian All Comers record
