= Tim Ford =

Tim Ford may refer to:

- Tim Ford (politician) (1951–2015), speaker of the Mississippi House of Representatives
- Tim Ford (swimmer), Australian freestyle swimmer
- Tim Ford, member of the band The Vermicious Knid

== See also ==
- Timothy Ford (born 1887), American long distance runner
