= Suki Brownsdon =

British swimmer

Personal information
- Full name: Susannah Claire Brownsdon
- Nickname: "Suki"
- National team: Great Britain
- Born: 16 October 1965 (age 60) Banbury, England
- Height: 1.68 m (5 ft 6 in)
- Weight: 57 kg (126 lb; 9.0 st)

Sport
- Sport: Swimming
- Strokes: Breastroke, medley
- Club: Birmingham City; Royal Tunbridge Wells Monson, Wigan WASPS
Medal record
Women's swimming
Representing Great Britain
European Championships
Silver medal – second place	1981 Split	100 m breaststroke
Universiade
Bronze medal – third place	1987 Zagreb	100 m breaststroke
Representing England
Commonwealth Games
Gold medal – first place	1986 Edinburgh	4×100 m medley
Silver medal – second place	1982 Brisbane	4×100 m medley
Silver medal – second place	1990 Auckland	4×100 m medley
Bronze medal – third place	1982 Brisbane	100 m breaststroke
Bronze medal – third place	1990 Auckland	100 m breaststroke

Susannah Claire "Suki" Brownsdon (born 16 October 1965) is an English former competitive swimmer who won a silver medal in the women's 100-metre breaststroke at the 1981 European Championships, and represented Great Britain at four consecutive Olympic Games, with her best results being sixth place in the 100-metre breaststroke final in 1980 and seventh place in the 200-metre breaststroke final in 1984. She also represented England at three Commonwealth Games, winning a total of five medals.

== Early life ==
Brownsdon attended Millfield School from 1982 to 1984.

== Career ==
Brownsdon's first Olympic experience was as a 14-year-old at the 1980 Summer Olympics in Moscow, where she finished sixth in the 100-metre breastroke final. At the 1981 European Championships, she won a silver medal in the 100-metre breaststroke. Representing England at the 1982 Commonwealth Games in Brisbane, Australia, she won a bronze medal in the 100-metre breaststroke and a silver medal in the medley relay, along with Catherine White, Ann Osgerby and June Croft. She also finished fourth in the 200-metre breaststroke final.

At the 1984 Summer Olympics in Los Angeles, Brownsdon reached the final of the 200-metre breaststroke, finishing seventh. In the spring of 1985, she won the US Short Course 200-metre breaststroke title. She then went on to finish seventh in both the 100-metre and 200-metre breaststroke finals at the 1985 European Championships. She missed out on individual medals for England at the 1986 Commonwealth Games, finishing fourth in the 100-metre breaststroke and fifth in the 200-metre. She did though, win a gold medal in the 4x100-metre medley relay, along with Caroline Cooper, Nicola Fibbens and Simone Hindmarsh. She again reached both individual finals at the 1987 European Championships, finishing fifth in the 100-metre and eighth in the 200-metre.

Brownsdon competed at the 1988 Summer Olympics in Seoul, where she reached the B Final of the 100-metre breaststroke, placing 16th overall. In the 200-metre breaststroke and 400-metre individual medley events, she was eliminated in the heats, placing 20th and 18th overall. later that year, she won US Open titles in the 100-metre breaststroke and 4x100-metre medley relay. In 1989, she reached both breaststroke finals at the European Championships for the third consecutive time, finishing eighth in both. At the 1990 Commonwealth Games as part of the England team, she took her Commonwealth medal tally to five, winning a bronze medal in the 100-metre breaststroke final and a silver medal in the 4x100-metre medley relay, with Joanne Deakins, Madeleine Scarborough and Karen Pickering, replicating her achievements from the 1982 Games. She also finished sixth in the 200-metre breaststroke final.

Brownsdon's fourth and final Olympic appearance was at the 1992 Summer Olympics in Barcelona, where she was eliminated in the heats of both breaststroke events, placing 23rd overall in the 100-metre and 21st in the 200-metre. She competed at the 1996 British Olympic trials but failed to earn selection for the Atlanta Olympics.

She was very successful in the ASA National British Championships winning 12 titles; five in the 100 metres breaststroke (1981, 1986, 1987, 1988, 1989), six in the 200 metres breaststroke (1981, 1986, 1987, 1988, 1989, 1990) and the 400 metres medley title in 1989.

== Personal life ==
Brownsdon was born in Banbury, Oxfordshire, England. In 2003, she moved to Brisbane, Australia, where her eldest son, Buster Sykes, became a national junior champion in the 200-metre breaststroke. Brownsdon frequently visits the UK and was part of the Olympic torch relay for the 2012 Summer Olympics in London.

== International competitions ==
Year	Competition	Venue	Position	Event	Notes
Representing Great Britain / England
1980	Olympic Games	Moscow, Soviet Union	6th	100 m breaststroke	1:12.11
1981	European Championships	Split, Yugoslavia	2nd	100 m breaststroke	1:11.05
1982	Commonwealth Games	Brisbane, Australia	3rd	100 m breaststroke	1:13.76
1982	Commonwealth Games	Brisbane, Australia	4th	200 m breaststroke	2:38.45
1982	Commonwealth Games	Brisbane, Australia	2nd	4 × 100 m medley	4:19.04
1984	Olympic Games	Los Angeles, United States	7th	200 m breaststroke	2:35.07
1985	European Championships	Sofia, Bulgaria	7th	100 m breaststroke	
1985	European Championships	Sofia, Bulgaria	7th	200 m breaststroke	2:36.59
1986	Commonwealth Games	Edinburgh, Scotland	4th	100 m breaststroke	1:12.30
1986	Commonwealth Games	Edinburgh, Scotland	5th	200 m breaststroke	2:35.98
1986	Commonwealth Games	Edinburgh, Scotland	1st	4 × 100 m medley	4:13.48
1986	World Championships	Madrid, Spain	13th	100 m breaststroke	1:12.60
1986	World Championships	Madrid, Spain	14th	200 m breaststroke	2:37.34
1986	World Championships	Madrid, Spain	10th	4 × 100 m medley	4:19.37
1987	European Championships	Strasbourg, France	5th	100 m breaststroke	1:10.66
1987	European Championships	Strasbourg, France	8th	200 m breaststroke	2:35.30
1987	European Championships	Strasbourg, France	6th	4 × 100 m medley	4:13.81
1988	Olympic Games	Seoul, South Korea	16th	100 m breaststroke	1:11.95
1988	Olympic Games	Seoul, South Korea	20th	200 m breaststroke	2:36.14
1988	Olympic Games	Seoul, South Korea	18th	400 m Individual medley	4:54.66
1988	Olympic Games	Seoul, South Korea	9th	4 × 100 m medley	4:16.18
1989	European Championships	Bonn, Germany	8th	100 m breaststroke	1:11.63
1989	European Championships	Bonn, Germany	8th	200 m breaststroke	2:35.78
1990	Commonwealth Games	Auckland, New Zealand	3rd	100 m breaststroke	1:11.54
1990	Commonwealth Games	Auckland, New Zealand	6th	200 m breaststroke	2:35.73
1990	Commonwealth Games	Auckland, New Zealand	2nd	4 × 100 m medley	4:11.88
1992	Olympic Games	Barcelona, Spain			
1992	Olympic Games	Barcelona, Spain	23rd	100 m breaststroke	1:13.24
1992	Olympic Games	Barcelona, Spain	21st	200 m breaststroke	2:35.28
1992	Olympic Games	Barcelona, Spain	10th	4 × 100 m medley	4:16.51
