= Beverley Rose =

British swimmer (born 1964)

Personal information
- Nationality: British
- Born: 21 January 1964 (age 62) Amersham, Buckinghamshire, England
- Height: 168 cm (5 ft 6 in)
- Weight: 60 kg (132 lb)

Sport
- Sport: Swimming
- Club: Scotia SSC, Glasgow
Medal record
Representing Scotland
Commonwealth Games
Bronze medal – third place	1982 Brisbane	4x100 medley relay

Beverley Rose (born 21 January 1964) is a British former swimmer who competed at the 1984 Summer Olympics and won a bronze medal for Scotland at the Commonwealth Games.

== Biography ==
Rose represented the Scottish team at the 1982 Commonwealth Games in Brisbane, Australia, where she competed in the swimming programme. She won a bronze medal in the 4 x 100 metres medley relay with Cathy Finlay, Nicola Geddes and Nikki Ramsay.

At the 1984 Olympics in Los Angeles, Rose competed in two events the 100 metres backstroke and the 4 x 100 metres medley relay.

Rose attended a second Commonwealth Games for Scotland at the 1986 Games in Edinburgh, competing in the backstroke events.
