= Pamela Rai =

Canadian swimmer (born 1966)

Pamela Leila Rai
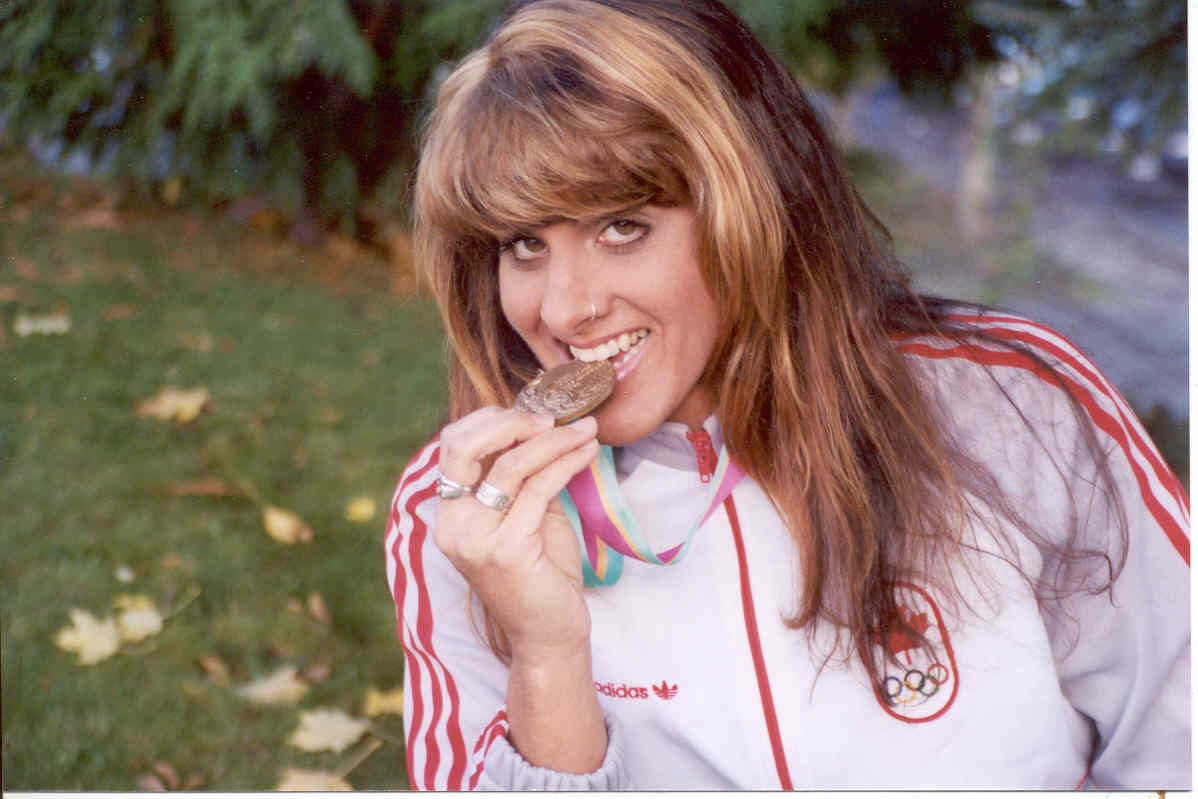
- Rai with bronze medal, 1984 Olympics

Personal information
- Full name: Pamela Leila Rai
- Nickname: "Pam"
- National team: Canada
- Born: March 29, 1966 (age 60) New Westminster, British Columbia, Canada
- Occupations: Swim coach, teacher
- Height: 1.72 m (5 ft 8 in)
- Weight: 57 kg (126 lb)

Sport
- Sport: Swimming
- Strokes: Freestyle
- Club: Hyack Swim Club
- College team: University of Victoria
- Coach: John Campbell, Ron Jacks (Hyack); Dr. Peter Vizsolyi (UVictoria)
Medal record
Women's swimming
Representing Canada
Olympic Games
| Bronze medal – third place | 1984 Los Angeles | 4×100 m medley |
Pan American Games
| Silver medal – second place | 1983 Caracas | 4×100 m freestyle |
Commonwealth Games
| Gold medal – first place | 1986 Edinburgh | 4×100 m freestyle |

Pamela Leila Rai (born March 29, 1966, in New Westminster, BC, Canada) is a former freestyle and butterfly swimmer who competed for the University of Victoria, and represented Canada at the 1984 Los Angeles Olympics, capturing a bronze medal and setting a new Canadian record in the 4 × 100-metre medley relay. She became not only the first Canadian Olympic medalist of Indian descent, but the first woman of Indian ancestry to win an Olympic medal. A former Canadian record holder in several events, Rai successfully represented Canada through 1986 at international meets including the Pan American and Commonwealth games. After her time as a swimming competitor, she served as a swim coach, and high school English, Social Justice, Special Ed. and Math teacher in Nanaimo, BC, Canada.

== Early life and swimming ==
Raised in nearby Delta, Pamela Rai was born March 29, 1966, in New Westminster, British Columbia, to father Harinder, an Indian immigrant, and her native Canadian mother Gladys Marie Sikorski who grew up on a prairie farm in Saskatchewan. With her father building a backyard pool using his own labor, she, her brother and two sisters grew up swimming all summer and were good swimmers from an early age. In 1964, two years before her birth, Rai's father, Harinder Jit Singh Rai, a field hockey competitor, was the first Indo-Canadian to qualify for an Olympic Games. His stellar skills as a forward on Canada's field hockey team led him to score the only goal in an international meet against the United States in Rye, New York, on October 21, 1962, which led to a Canadian 1–0 victory and helped secure Canada's entry to the Olympics trials. In the PreOlympic tournament in Lyon, France, in 1963, Harinder made important contributions in the qualifying games which led to Canada's first acceptance to the Olympics. Just prior to the 1964 Olympic Games in Tokyo, Japan, he was removed from the team by officials who many believe favoured an all-white team.

Young women from India were not traditionally encouraged to pursue sports as a primary avocation. Breaking with tradition, Pamela's parents were particularly supportive of her demanding athletic career. In addition to being a former national athlete who drove her to countless practices and attended her many local meets, her father served as vice-president of the British Columbia Amateur Swimming Association. and the president of the Hyack Swim Club of New Westminster, BC, Canada for many years.

=== Early clubs and coaches ===
Pamela started to swim competitively by the age of six continuing through the age of nine, with the nearby Surrey Knights Swim Club at the Surrey Recreation Center. Around 1975, she began competing and training with the Hyack Swim Club whose coaches included Canadian Hall of Fame Coach Ron Jacks, and Assistant Coach John Campbell, practicing primarily at the Canada Games Pool in Westminster. Campbell coached the Hyacks club as an Assistant Head Coach from 1977 to 1981, working with Rai from around ages 10 through 15. Jacks coached the Hyacks Club from the early 1970s through 1994, making him available throughout Pamela's elementary and high school swimming career. Rai's peak High School training later consisted of an early two hour workout before school with an equally intense two hour evening training period after school, conducted six days a week, eleven months a year. In January, 1982, swimming for the Hyack Club at 15, Rai won the 100-meter butterfly, the 50-meter freestyle, and the 100-meter breaststroke in a time of 1:17.67 at the Hyack Invitational. She attended Sunshine Hills Elementary, in North Delta, where she took an early interest in Art, winning a competition to promote fire prevention in 1975. She later attended North Delta Secondary School, a public high school in Delta, B.C, where she graduated in 1984.

== International swimming highlights ==
Pamela joined the junior Canadian national team at 12, having already set 16 Canadian age-group records. At 14, she qualified for the senior Canadian national team where she continued until 1986 when she was 20. At the Canadian Nationals in 1979, she performed well in the 100 m butterfly and the and both the 50 and 100 meter freestyle events.

== 1980 Olympic trials ==
She placed third in the 50-meter freestyle at the 1980 Canadian Olympic trial finals in Toronto. She did not qualify for the Canadian team, as only the top two finishers were selected to represent Canada at the Olympics. In 1981, she won six medals including a gold medal at the Canada games in the 50m freestyle.

Among her most significant accomplishments on the international swimming scene, Rai won a silver medal in the 4x100 metre freestyle relay, at the 1983 Pan American Games in Caracas. She won a silver medal at the 1983 Hapoel Games in Israel. At the 1985 Pan Pacific Championships, she captured silver in the 4 × 100 m freestyle relay, and later at the 1986 Commonwealth Games, won a gold medal in the same event.

== 1984 Olympics ==
Representing Canada at only 18, Rai competed at the 1984 Summer Olympics in Los Angeles, California where she won an Olympic bronze medal in the Women's 4 × 100 m medley relay with a new Canadian record time of 4:12.98, with teammates Anne Ottenbrite, Reema Abdo and Michelle MacPherson. Rai swam the 100 m freestyle leg of the medley with a split time of 56.64, improving on her time in the preliminaries. In a very close race for the bronze, the Canadian team finished only a second behind the German team that took the silver medal with a time of 4:11.97. The American team took the gold with a time of 4:08.34. Rai dedicated her 1984 Olympic success to her father who was not permitted to compete for Canada in the 1964 Olympics, and died from leukemia 3 months prior to her competing in the games.

At the same Olympics she also swam with Canada's 4 × 100 m freestyle relay team which finished fifth with a time of 3:49.50 with Jane Kerr, Carol Klimpel, Cheryl McArton, and Maureen New. Rai placed twelfth in the 100 metre freestyle event at the 1984 games with a time of 57.56.

=== University of Victoria ===
From 1984 to 1986 Rai swam for the University of Victoria, swimming only two full seasons, yet dominating Canadian university women's swimming. She graduated the University of Victoria with a degree in sociology in 1990, later pursuing studies in education at the University of British Columbia in Vancouver from 1994 to 1995. During her collegiate swimming career, she trained primarily with UVic Head Swimming Coach Dr. Peter Vizsolyi who began swim coaching at UVic in 1983 and would coach 10 Canadian Olympic swimmers during his long coaching tenure. Shannon's on campus training facility was the McKinnon Pool at the Archie McKinnon Building, built in 1975, on the U. Victoria campus, which consisted of a six lane pool and a diving well. She also trained with her former Coach Ron Jacks with the Vic-O team While swimming for the university, she set five Canadian Interscholastic Athletic Union (CIAU) records in two years and was subsequently recognized as the 1985 Canadian University Swimmer of the Year. Her Canadian records set during the 1985 CIAU Championships included a time of 4:17.32 in the 400m freestyle, and 57.34 in the 100m freestyle.

At the 1986 Canada West Championships, she placed first in the 400-metre freestyle with a time of 4:22.71, eclipsing her previous record of 4:30.52. She placed first in the 800-metre freestyle with a time of 9:01.74, eclipsing her previous record of 9:09.61, and also won the 100-metre butterfly.

Before her 1986 retirement from competitive swimming, Pamela competed on Canada's 4 × 100 m freestyle relay team, capturing a gold medal at Edinburgh Scotland's Commonwealth Games. She and her teammates established a new Canadian and Commonwealth record of 3:48.45 for the event.

=== Coach and teaching careers ===
From 1985 through 2005, Rai intermittently coached swimming to youth at clubs in Delta, North Vancouver, Courtenay, and Manama, Bahrain.

After a career of over 25 years, Rai retired as a high school English, Math, Special Education, and social justice teacher primarily with Nanaimo District Secondary School (NDSS) in Nanaimo, Vancouver Island. Outside her professional life, Pamela continues to enjoy swimming and is a certified yoga instructor trained in India of the Sivananda lineage. Rai opened Dharti Mata Centre in Nanaimo, British Columbia while serving as a teacher in Nanaimo. She served as a member of the BC Games Society board of directors for 6 years.

In 2021, Pamela continued her social activism representing the need to preserve old forests as a member of the Rainforest Flying Squad, a volunteer organization dedicated to protecting the little remaining old growth forests on Vancouver Island.

=== Honors ===
Rai was a University of Victoria Athlete of the Year in both 1985 and 1986, and a City of Victoria Athlete of the Year in 1985. She has been inducted into the British Columbia Sports Hall of Fame, and the 2005 University of Victoria Vikings Hall of Fame, as the first female athlete inducted. She has also been made a member of the Delta Sports Hall of Fame, and the British Columbia Swimming Hall of Fame. She is the first woman of Indian ancestry in the world to win an Olympic medal. She became a member of the Delta Sports Hall of fame in Canada West Hall of Fame in 2019. She has been honoured in the Indo-Canadian community at various events.

== See also ==
- List of Olympic medalists in swimming (women)
