= Jason Plummer =

Jason Plummer may refer to:

- Jason Plummer (swimmer)
- Jason Plummer (politician)
- Jake Plummer, American football player
