= Swimming at the 1983 Summer Universiade =

Swimming at the XII Summer Universiade
- Dates: 2 July 1983 – 7 July 1983

The swimming competitions at the 1983 Summer Universiade were held at the Kinsmen Aquatic Centre in Edmonton, Alberta, Canada from July 2 to July 7, 1983.

== Men's events ==
Medals table for Men's events.

Event	Gold		Silver		Bronze	
100 m freestyle	Sergey Smiryagin; Soviet Union	50.51 CR	Tom Jager; United States	51.02	Andreas Schmidt; West Germany	51.60
200 m freestyle	Bruce Hayes; United States	1:51.19 CR	Aleksey Filonov; Soviet Union	1:51.90	Alex Baumann; Canada	1:51.97
400 m freestyle	Vladimir Salnikov; Soviet Union	3:49.38 CR	Bruce Hayes; United States	3:54.93	Svyatoslav Semenov; Soviet Union	3:56.57
1500 m freestyle	Vladimir Salnikov; Soviet Union	15:02.83 CR	Svyatoslav Semenov; Soviet Union	15:28.36	Bruce Hayes; United States	15:37.97
100 m backstroke	Mike West; Canada	56.64 CR, NR	Vladimir Shemetov; Soviet Union	56.71	Viktor Kuznetsov; Soviet Union	56.74
200 m backstroke	Sergei Zabolotnov; Soviet Union	2:00.42 CR, NR	Vladimir Shemetov; Soviet Union	2:01.27	Mike West; Canada	2:01.63 CWR
100 m breaststroke	Shigehiro Takahashi; Japan	1:04.13	Yuri Kis; Soviet Union	1:04.21	Peter Evans; Australia	1:04.32
200 m breaststroke	Robertas Žulpa; Soviet Union	2:15.93 CR	Shigehiro Takahashi; Japan	2:19.72	Gennadiy Utenkov; Soviet Union	2:19.80
100 m butterfly	Aleksey Markovsky; Soviet Union	54.65 CR	Tom Jager; United States	55.45	Tom Ponting; Canada	55.55
200 m butterfly	Sergey Fesenko, Sr. Soviet Union	2:00.38 CR	Philip Hubble; Great Britain	2:01.36	Anthony Mosse; New Zealand	2:02.03
200 m individual medley	Alex Baumann; Canada	2:02.29 CR	Oleksandr Sydorenko; Soviet Union	2:04.41	Ricardo Prado; Brazil	2:05.50
400 m individual medley	Alex Baumann; Canada	4:19.80 CR, CWR	Bruce Hayes; United States	4:26.05	Ricardo Prado; Brazil	4:26.87
4×100 m freestyle relay	Soviet Union (URS)	3:21.72 CR	United States (USA); Tom Jager; Chris Silva; Dallas Kyle; Bruce Hayes	3:21.82	Canada (CAN); Peter Szmidt; Wayne Kelly	3:26.38
4×200 m freestyle relay	Soviet Union (URS)	7:27.22 CR	United States (USA); Stewart Macdonald; Rich Bodor; Bruce Hayes; Richard Saeger	7:30.18	Canada (CAN); Wayne Kelly; Dave Shemilt	7:31.40
4×100 m medley relay	Soviet Union (URS)	3:44.33 CR	Canada (CAN)	3:46.49	United States (USA)	3:46.65

Legend: CR – Championship record; CWR – Commonwealth record; NR – National record

== Women's events ==
Medals table for Women's events.

Event	Gold		Silver		Bronze	
100 m freestyle	Irina Laricheva; Soviet Union	58.15	Annelies Kraus; Netherlands	58.27	Tammy Thomas; United States	58.45
200 m freestyle	Irina Laricheva; Soviet Union	2:02.17 CR	Annelies Kraus; Netherlands	2:02.78	Irina Gerasimova; Soviet Union	2:02.84
400 m freestyle	Irina Laricheva; Soviet Union	4:13.41 CR,NR	Marybeth Linzmeier; United States	4:15.36	Julie Daigneault; Canada	4:17.77
800 m freestyle	Irina Laricheva; Soviet Union	8:40.31	Marybeth Linzmeier; United States	8:41.43	Julie Daigneault; Canada	8:53.52
100 m backstroke	Larisa Gorchakova; Soviet Union	1:03.28	Carmen Bunaciu; Romania	1:03.77	Susan Walsh; United States	1:03.80
200 m backstroke	Larisa Gorchakova; Soviet Union	2:15.37	Carmen Bunaciu; Romania	2:15.96	Susan Walsh; United States	2:16.41
100 m breaststroke	Larisa Belokon; Soviet Union	1:12.17 CR	Ayshkute Buzelite; Soviet Union	1:13.08	Manuela Dalla Valle; Italy	1:13.90
200 m breaststroke	Larisa Belokon; Soviet Union	2:34.02 CR	Ayshkute Buzelite; Soviet Union	2:34.58	Lisa Borsholt; Canada	2:36.22
100 m butterfly	Susie Woodhouse; Australia	1:01.79 CR	Cinzia Savi Scarponi; Italy	1:02.31	Naoko Kume; Japan	1:02.48
200 m butterfly	Susie Woodhouse; Australia	2:13.50 CR	Naoko Kume; Japan	2:15.02	Michelle Ford; Australia	2:15.38
200 m individual medley	Irina Gerasimova; Soviet Union	2:18.23 CR	Cinzia Savi Scarponi; Italy	2:19.75	Vera Barker; United States	2:20.63
400 m individual medley	Irina Gerasimova; Soviet Union	4:52.27 CR	Cinzia Savi Scarponi; Italy	4:55.77	Christi Woolger; United States	4:56.70
4×100 m freestyle relay	Soviet Union (URS)	3:49.64 CR	United States (USA); E. Emery; J. Williams; I. Lawrence; Tammy Thomas	3:50.19	Canada (CAN); Maureen New	3:54.67
4×200 m freestyle relay	Soviet Union (URS)	8:21.78	Australia (AUS)	8:22.74	West Germany (FRG)	8:23.48
4×100 m medley relay	Soviet Union (URS)	4:14.10 CR	United States (USA); Susan Walsh; Jeanne Childs; Jane Wagstaff; J. Williams	4:16.29	Canada (CAN); Reema Abdo	4:22.46

Legend: CR – Championship record; CWR – Commonwealth record; NR – National record

== Medal table ==
Rank	Nation	Gold	Silver	Bronze	Total
1	Soviet Union (URS)	22	8	4	34
2	Canada (CAN)	3	1	9	13
3	Australia (AUS)	2	1	2	5
4	United States (USA)	1	10	7	18
5	Japan (JPN)	1	2	1	4
6	Italy (ITA)	0	3	1	4
7	Netherlands (NED)	0	2	0	2
7	Romania (ROU)	0	2	0	2
9	Brazil (BRA)	0	0	2	2
9	West Germany (FRG)	0	0	2	2
11	New Zealand (NZL)	0	0	1	1
Totals (11 entries)		29	29	29	87
