= Amy White =

American swimmer

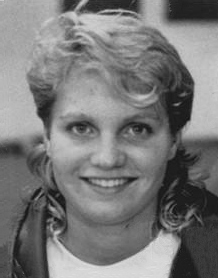
- White in 1984

Personal information
- Full name: Amy Lee White
- National team: United States
- Born: October 20, 1968 (age 57) Redondo Beach, California, U.S.
- Occupation: Paralegal
- Height: 5 ft 8 in (1.73 m)
- Weight: 126 lb (57 kg)
- Spouse: James Earnest Ballidis (m. 1998)

Sport
- Sport: Swimming
- Strokes: Backstroke
- Club: Mission Viejo Nadadores
- College team: Southern Methodist University
- Coach: Mark Schubert (Mission Viejo)
Medal record
Representing the United States
Olympic Games
Silver medal – second place	1984 Los Angeles	200 m backstroke
Pan American Games
Gold medal – first place	1983 Caracas	200 m backstroke

Amy Lee White (born October 20, 1968), later known by her married name Amy Ballidis, is an American former competition swimmer who competed for Southern Methodist University and represented the United States at the 1984 Los Angeles Olympics, winning a silver medal in the women's 200-meter backstroke. She swam for the Mission Viejo Nadadores.

Mark Schubert, 1988

Amy Lee White was born in Redondo Beach, California, to Mr. and Mrs. Wallace White on October 20, 1968 and attended Irvine, California's University High School. At the peak of her swimming career, she trained and competed with the highly competitive program of the Mission Viejo Nadadores under Hall of Fame Head Coach Mark Schubert through 1985.

In an important career victory, at the 1983 Pan American Games in Caracas, Venezuela, White captured the gold medal in the 200-meter backstroke at the age of only 14. She later won the 1984 US title in 200 backstroke, and placed second in 1983.

== 1984 Los Angeles Olympic silver ==
She represented the United States as a 15-year-old High School Junior at the 1984 Summer Olympics in Los Angeles, California. She received a silver medal for her second-place performance in the women's 200-meter backstroke, finishing with a time of 2:13.04, behind Dutch swimmer Jolanda de Rover. Aneta Patrascoiu of Romania placed third for the bronze.

White attended Southern Methodist University, but left the women's swim team after her Sophomore year suffering from back injuries.

She married James Earnest Ballidis, a Southwestern School of Law graduate, on April 25, 1998, while working for the law firm Alan and Flatt in Newport, California. Ballidis was the primary litigating attorney for the firm.

== See also ==
- List of Olympic medalists in swimming (women)
- List of Southern Methodist University people
