= Blair Hicken =

Canadian swimmer (born 1965)

Personal information
- Born: 10 February 1965 (age 61) Mississauga, Ontario, Canada

Sport
- Sport: Swimming
Medal record
Representing Canada
Commonwealth Games
Silver medal – second place	1986 Edinburgh	4x100m freestyle relay
Bronze medal – third place	1982 Brisbane	4x100m freestyle relay
Bronze medal – third place	1990 Auckland	4x100m freestyle relay

Blair Hicken (born 10 February 1965) is a Canadian swimmer. He competed in two events at the 1984 Summer Olympics.
