= Iain Campbell (swimmer) =

British swimmer (born 1965)

Personal information
- Born: 21 April 1965 (age 61) Lagos, Nigeria

Sport
- Sport: Swimming
Medal record
Representing Scotland
Commonwealth Games
Bronze medal – third place	1982 Brisbane	4x100 medley relay

Iain Campbell (born 21 April 1965) is a British swimmer. He competed in two events at the 1984 Summer Olympics. Representing Scotland, he won a bronze medal in the 4x100 medley relay at the 1982 Commonwealth Games and also competed at the 1986 Commonwealth Games.

== Personal life ==
His elder brother Doug Campbell was also an Olympic swimmer (as was Doug's wife Nikki Fibbens, and her brother Mike Fibbens).

Like his brother, he married another swimmer, Madeleine Scarborough, at the Sacred Heart RC church Waterlooville in September 1990.
