= Mike Fibbens =

British swimmer

Personal information
- Full name: Michael Wenham Fibbens
- Nickname: "Mike"
- National team: Great Britain
- Born: 31 May 1968 (age 58) Harlow, Essex, England
- Height: 6 ft 4 in (1.93 m)
- Weight: 225 lb (102 kg)

Sport
- Sport: Swimming
- Strokes: Freestyle
- Club: Hatfield Swimming Club
Medal record
Men's swimming
Representing Great Britain
World Championships - Short Course
Bronze medal – third place	1993 Palma	4×100 m medley
European Championships - Long Course
Bronze medal – third place	1991 Athens	50 m freestyle
Bronze medal – third place	1993 Sheffield	4×100 m medley
Representing England
Commonwealth Games
Bronze medal – third place	1990 Auckland	100 m freestyle

Michael Wenham Fibbens (born 31 May 1968) is an English former competitive swimmer

== Swimming career ==
He represented Great Britain in three consecutive Summer Olympic Games, the FINA world championships and the European championships, and competed for England in the Commonwealth Games.

He is a four times winner of the British Championship in 50 metres freestyle (1989, 1991, 1993, 1994) and a four times winner in the 100 metres freestyle (1989, 1991-1993). He also won the 50 metres butterfly title in 1991 and 1994 and the 100 metres butterfly title in 1991 and 1993.

== Personal life ==
His elder sister Nikki Fibbens was also an Olympic swimmer (as was her husband Doug Campbell, and his brother Iain Campbell).

== See also ==
- List of Commonwealth Games medallists in swimming (men)
