= Harinder Jit Singh Rai =

Canadian field hockey player

Hardinder Jit Singh Rai (died 1984), nicknamed Pandit, was an international-level Canadian field hockey forward. In 1956-57 he played for the University of British Columbia. On October 21, 1962 he scored Canada's first ever international goal in Canada's first international game against the United States at Rye, New York, a game which Canada won 1–0. In 1963 he played for Canada in the Pre-Olympic tournament in Lyon, France, the result of which qualified the Canadian team for the 1964 Tokyo Olympics. He was nonetheless excluded from the Olympic team due to the desire of the committee to field an all white team.

Rai was married to Gladys Marie Sikorski until his death from leukemia in 1984. Three months after his death, their daughter, swimmer Pamela Rai, dedicated her success in the 1984 Summer Olympics to him.
