= Philip Osborn (swimmer) =

English swimmer

Personal information
- Nationality: English
Medal record
Swimming
Representing England
Commonwealth Games
Silver medal – second place	1982 Brisbane	4x100 freestyle relay
Silver medal – second place	1982 Brisbane	4x200 freestyle relay

Philip Osborn is a male former swimmer who competed for England.

== Swimming career ==
Osborn represented England and won two silver medals in the 4 x 100 metres and 4 x 200 metres freestyle relays, in addition to competing in the individual freestyle events, at the 1982 Commonwealth Games in Brisbane, Queensland, Australia.

- He swam for the Beckenham Club.

- He Now Coaches at Bedes Senior School in Hailsham.
