= Stephen Poulter (swimmer) =

British swimmer (born 1961)

Steve Poulter
Personal information
- Born: 18 February 1961 (age 65) Whalley, Lancashire, England

Sport
- Club: Wigan Wasps
Medal record
Swimming
Representing England
Commonwealth Games
| Silver medal – second place | 1982 Brisbane | 400m medley |
| Bronze medal – third place | 1986 Edinburgh | 400m medley |

Stephen J. "Steve" Poulter (born 18 February 1961, in Whalley, Lancashire) is a British retired swimmer.

== Swimming career ==
Poulter competed at the 1980 and 1984 Olympics.

He represented England and won a silver medal in the 400 metres individual medley, at the 1982 Commonwealth Games in Brisbane, Queensland, Australia. Four years later he represented England and won a bronze medal in the 400 metres individual medley, at the 1986 Commonwealth Games in Edinburgh, Scotland. He also won the 1981 and 1982 ASA National British Championships title in the 400 metres medley and the 1981 200 metres butterfly title.

== See also ==
- List of Commonwealth Games medallists in swimming (men)
