= Marybeth Linzmeier =

American swimmer (born 1963)

Personal information
- Full name: Marybeth Linzmeier Dorst
- National team: United States
- Born: July 24, 1963 (age 62)

Sport
- Sport: Swimming
- Strokes: Freestyle
- Club: Mission Viejo Nadadores
- College team: Stanford University
Medal record
Women's swimming
Representing the United States
Pan American Games
Silver medal – second place	1983 Caracas	800 m freestyle
Summer Universiade
Silver medal – second place	1983 Edmonton	400 m freestyle
Silver medal – second place	1983 Edmonton	800 m freestyle

Marybeth Linzmeier Dorst (born July 24, 1963), née Marybeth Linzmeier, is an American former competition swimmer who represented the United States at the Pan American Games and the World University Games in the early 1980s.

== Early life ==
Linzmeier was a star swimmer at Mission Viejo High School in Mission Viejo, California and qualified for the 1980 Summer Olympics in Moscow in several swimming events. Due to the United States-led boycott of the Moscow Olympics in protest of the Soviet invasion of Afghanistan, however, she did not participate in the Olympics.

== Collegiate career ==
Linzmeier attended Stanford University, where she won eight individual NCAA titles competing for the Stanford Cardinal swimming and diving team. She was later named to the Stanford Athletic Hall of Fame. Linzmeier missed qualifying for the 1984 U.S. Olympics team by three one-hundredths (0.03) of a second.

== After swimming ==
Linzmeier Dorst is a real estate agent in the San Francisco Bay Area. She and her husband, Christopher Dorst, a silver medalist as a member of the 1984 U.S. Olympic water polo team, have three daughters.

== See also ==
- List of Stanford University people
