= Douglas Campbell (swimmer) =

British swimmer (born 1960)

Doug Campbell
Personal information
- Nationality: British (Scottish)
- Born: 30 September 1960 (age 65) Dundee, Scotland
- Height: 183 cm (6 ft 0 in)
- Weight: 79 kg (174 lb)

Sport
- Sport: Swimming
- Strokes: backstroke/ freestyle
- Club: NCR Dundee
- College team: University of Houston
Medal record
Swimming
Representing Scotland
Commonwealth Games
Bronze medal – third place	1982 Brisbane	medley relay
Bronze medal – third place	1982 Brisbane	freestyle relay

Douglas "Doug" Fraser Campbell (born 30 September 1960) is a male retired British swimmer. He competed at 2 Commonwealth Games and 2 World Championships as well as the 1980 Olympic Games.

== Swimming career ==
Campbell competed in three events at the 1980 Summer Olympics finishing 7th in the 200m Backstroke in a new British Record which stood for 7 years. Representing Scotland, he won bronze medals in the 4×200 m freestyle relay and 4x100 medley relay at the 1982 Commonwealth Games. At the ASA National British Championships he won the 100 metres backstroke title in 1980 and the 200 metres backstroke title three times (1979, 1980, 1981).

== Personal life ==
His younger brother Iain Campbell, wife Nikki Fibbens and brother-in-law Mike Fibbens were all also Olympic swimmers.
