= Katherine Richardson (swimmer) =

Canadian swimmer

Personal information
- Nationality: Canadian

Sport
- Sport: Swimming
- Event: Breaststroke/Medley
- Club: Granite Club Toronto/ Brock University Badgers
Medal record
Representing Canada
Commonwealth Games
Bronze medal – third place	1982 Brisbane	200m breaststroke

Katherine Richardson-Dingley is a Canadian former swimmer.

A national champion in the 400m individual medley in 1980, Richardson made it onto Canada's swim team for that year's Moscow Olympics, but didn't participate due to her nation's boycott.

Richardson, who trained with the Toronto Granite Club, swam for Brock University from 1982 to 1984 and was named the university's "Female Athlete of the Year" on three occasions.

At the 1982 Commonwealth Games in Brisbane, Richardson won a bronze medal in the 200m breaststroke, finishing behind Anne Ottenbrite and Kathy Bald in a Canadian sweep of the medals. She finished the 400m individual medley final in the silver medal position but was disqualified as she was deemed to have had her head underwater leading into the backstroke turn.
