= Stephen Harrison (swimmer) =

English swimmer

Steve Harrison
Personal information
- Nationality: English
- Born: 1957 (age 68–69)
Medal record
Swimming
Representing England
Commonwealth Games
Silver medal – second place	1982 Brisbane	medley relay

Stephen Harrison (born 1957), is a male former swimmer who competed for England.

== Swimming career ==
Harrison represented England in the 100 metres and 200 metres backstroke events, at the 1978 Commonwealth Games in Edmonton, Alberta, Canada. Four years later he represented England and won a silver medal in the 4 x 100 metres medley relay, in addition to competing in the backstroke events, at the 1982 Commonwealth Games in Brisbane, Queensland, Australia.

He won the 1982 ASA National Championship title in the 100 metres backstroke.

== Coaching career ==
After retiring from competitive swimming he became a coach for the Romsey and Totton Swimming Club.
