= Catherine White (swimmer) =

British swimmer

Personal information
- Full name: Catherine White
- Nationality: British
- Born: 26 June 1965 (age 61) Portsmouth, England

Sport
- Sport: Swimming
- Strokes: Backstroke
- Club: South Tyneside
Medal record
Women's swimming
Representing England
Commonwealth Games
Silver medal – second place	1982 Brisbane	4×100 m medley

Catherine White (born 26 June 1965) is a former British swimmer who represented Great Britain at the 1984 Olympic Games and won a silver medal for England at the 1982 Commonwealth Games.

== Early life ==
White was born in Portsmouth. She was raised in Barnard Castle, County Durham, and educated at Barnard Castle School.

== International swimming career ==
At the 1982 Commonwealth Games in Brisbane, Australia, she represented England in the 100 m and 200 m backstroke, where she finished seventh and sixth respectively. She teamed up with Ann Osgerby, June Croft and Susannah Brownsdon for the women's 4×100 m medley relay where they finished in silver medal position behind Canada and ahead of Scotland in a time of 4:19.04.

At the 1984 Olympic Games in Los Angeles, California, United States, she participated in the 100 m and 200 m backstroke, reaching the 'B' final in both events.

White swam for England in the same two events two years later at the 1986 Commonwealth Games in Edinburgh, Scotland. She finished seventh in the 200 m backstroke final, but did not progress beyond the heats in the shorter event.

She won 1982 and 1983 ASA National Championship titles in the 100 metres backstroke and the 200 metres backstroke.

== Sources ==
- "British Olympic Association athlete profile". Archived from the original on 3 February 2010.
- "Sports Reference athlete profile". Archived from the original on 18 April 2020.
- "Commonwealth Games Federation athlete search". Archived from the original on 19 August 2009.
