= Debra Gore =

British swimmer (born 1967)

Personal information
- Born: 16 July 1967 (age 58) Blackpool, England

Sport
- Sport: Swimming
Medal record
Swimming
Representing England
Commonwealth Games
Gold medal – first place	1982 Brisbane	freestyle relay

Debra Gore (born 16 July 1967) is a British swimmer.

== Swimming career ==
Gore competed in the women's 4 × 100 metre freestyle relay at the 1984 Summer Olympics. She represented England and won a gold medal in the 4 x 100 metres freestyle relay, at the 1982 Commonwealth Games in Brisbane, Queensland, Australia. Four years later she represented England in the 100 metres freestyle, at the 1986 Commonwealth Games in Edinburgh, Scotland. She also won the 1984 ASA National Championship 100 metres freestyle title.
