= Nicola Fibbens =

British swimmer (born 1964)

Personal information
- Born: 29 April 1964 (age 62) Hertford, England

Sport
- Sport: Swimming
Medal record
Representing England
Commonwealth Games
| Gold medal – first place | 1982 Brisbane | freestyle relay |
| Gold medal – first place | 1986 Edinburgh | medley relay |
| Silver medal – second place | 1986 Edinburgh | freestyle relay |
| Bronze medal – third place | 1986 Edinburgh | 100m freestyle |

Nicola Fibbens (born 29 April 1964) is a British swimmer.

== Swimming career ==
Fibbens competed in four events at the 1984 Summer Olympics.

She represented England and won a gold medal in the 4 x 100 metres freestyle relay, at the 1982 Commonwealth Games in Brisbane, Queensland, Australia. Four years later she represented England and won three medals, a gold medal in the 4 x 100 metres medley relay, a silver medal in the 4 x 100 metres freestyle relay and a bronze medal in the 100 metres freestyle, at the 1986 Commonwealth Games in Edinburgh, Scotland. She is a two times winner of the British Championship in 50 metres freestyle (1984 and 1986).

== Personal life ==
Her younger brother Mike Fibbens, husband Doug Campbell and brother-in-law Iain Campbell were all also Olympic swimmers.
