= Freda Ross =

English swimmer

Personal information
- Nationality: English
- Born: 1965 (age 60–61) Bexley, London

Freda Ross (born 1965), is a female former swimmer who competed for England.

== Swimming career ==
Ross became National champion in 1982 when she won the 1982 ASA National Championship title in the 200 metres butterfly.

Ross represented England in the 100 and 200 metres butterfly events, at the 1982 Commonwealth Games in Brisbane, Queensland, Australia. At the ASA National British Championships she won the 200 metres butterfly title in 1982.
