= Wayne Kelly =

Canadian swimmer (born 1963)

Personal information
- Born: 19 March 1963 (age 63) Alma, Quebec, Canada

Sport
- Sport: Swimming
Medal record
Men's swimming
Representing Canada
World University Games
Bronze medal – third place	1983 Edmonton	4x100 m freestyle
Bronze medal – third place	1983 Edmonton	4x200 m freestyle

Wayne Kelly (born 19 March 1963) is a Canadian former swimmer. He competed in the men's 4 × 200 metre freestyle relay at the 1984 Summer Olympics.
