= Timothy Ford =

American long-distance runner

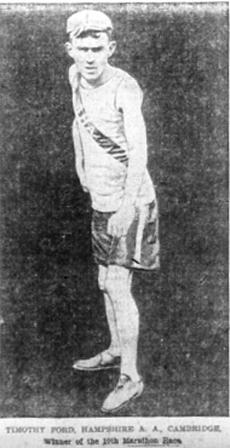
Timothy Ford

Timothy Ford (born 1887) was an American long-distance runner who won the Boston Marathon in 1906. At the age of eighteen, he is the youngest person ever to have won that race.

Ford was a plumber’s assistant from East Cambridge, Massachusetts. He first began running in 1904, when he competed in a ten-mile cross-country run held by the St. Alphonsus Athletic Association in Roxbury, Massachusetts, finishing in ninth place. He next competed in the Boston Marathon in 1905, and finished in fifteenth place with a time of 3:01.

Ford trained for the 1906 Boston Marathon under the guidance of the noted athletic trainer Frank “Tad” Gormley, beginning in the previous December with long walks, and only started running in February. Less than two weeks before the race Ford did a trial run of 22 ½ miles, mainly on the Marathon course, which he completed in 2:14. Five foot tall and weighing 113 ½ pounds, Ford was in fourteenth place in the Marathon race at the five-mile checkpoint in South Framingham, but worked his way up the field through a strong headwind and caught the leader, David Kneeland, at Charlesgate East, less than a mile from the finish. After a heavily contested battle with Kneeland, Ford finished in a time of 2:45:45, six seconds ahead of Kneeland. This would remain the closest Boston Marathon finish until 1971.

Ford ran under the colors of the Hampshire Athletic Association, an organization that did not exist. Ford could not obtain the sponsorship of an established athletic club, and so named his affiliation after Hampshire Street in Cambridge, where most of his friends lived.

Ford decided not to defend his title in 1907, believing that other runners had injured their chances by trying to win two consecutive marathons. He stated that he would enter the race in 1908, when he expected to beat the existing record of Jack Caffery. However, he did not run in 1908 either; rather, he followed the leaders in an automobile, and when the eventual winner Tom Morrissey took the lead, Ford attempted to give Morrissey coaching advice from the automobile. Morrissey told Ford to go away, fearing that he could be disqualified for receiving assistance from someone other than his official handler. When Ford continued to provide unwanted coaching advice, Morrissey grabbed Ford’s cap and tossed it into the crowd. Ford stopped to retrieve his cap, and Morrissey cruised on to victory.
