= Athletics at the 1982 Commonwealth Games – Women's heptathlon =

Women's heptathlon at the Commonwealth Games

The women's heptathlon event at the 1982 Commonwealth Games was held on 3 and 4 October at the QE II Stadium in Brisbane, Australia. It was the first time this event was held at the Commonwealth Games, replacing the pentathlon.

== Results ==
The highest mark recorded in each event is highlighted in yellow

Rank	Athlete	Nationality	100m H	SP	HJ	200m	LJ	JT	800m	Points	Notes
1st place, gold medalist(s)	Glynis Nunn	Australia	13.33	13.32	1.77	24.12	6.51	35.30	2:12.17	6282	
2nd place, silver medalist(s)	Judy Livermore	England	13.22	13.32	1.80	25.01	6.10	38.76	2:12.11	6214	
3rd place, bronze medalist(s)	Jill Ross	Canada	13.93	11.32	1.74	244.76	6.08	39.94	2:11.99	5981	
4	Kathryn Warren	England	14.14	11.86	1.65	24.83	6.00	33.10	2:16.91	5692	
5	Terry Genge	New Zealand	14.11	12.42	1.62	25.33	5.91	34.02	2:14.96	5679	
6	Julie White	Canada	14.43	11.79	1.74	25.32	5.76	32.12	2:21.25	5575	
7	Jocelyn Millar	Australia	14.84	9.01	1.74	25.33	5.85	38.02	2:17.86	5505	
8	Connie Polman-Tuin	Canada	14.27	11.94	1.59	25.31	5.69	31.14	2:28.60	5333	
9	Karen Forbes	New Zealand	15.05	11.00	1.65	25.55	5.80	26.52	2:18.42	5288	
10	Sarah Owen	Wales	14.71	11.80	1.68	25.72	5.19	29.12	2:24.60	5227	
11	Frida Kiptala	Kenya	16.75	10.82	1.47	25.48	5.29	40.02	2:18.98	5032	
12	Elizabeth Olaba	Kenya	19.02	13.19	1.50	27.16	5.11	43.24	2:40.75	4664	
	Katie Harders	Australia	15.11	10.76	1.65	26.52	5.30	DNS	–	DNF	
