= Jeff Sheehan =

Canadian swimmer

Personal information
- Born: Jeffrey Sheehan Connecticut, U.S.

Sport
- Country: Canada
- Sport: Swimming
- Event: Freestyle / Medley
Medal record
Commonwealth Games
Bronze medal – third place	1982 Brisbane	200 m medley
Universiade
Bronze medal – third place	1983 Edmonton	4×100 m freestyle

Jeffrey Sheehan is a Canadian former freestyle and medley swimmer of the 1980s.

Sheehan, a Connecticut-born swimmer, won a bronze medal for Canada in the 200 metre medley at the 1982 Commonwealth Games in Brisbane. He swam for the University of Calgary and won a further bronze medal at the 1983 Summer Universiade in Edmonton as part of Canada's 4 x 100 metre freestyle relay team.
