= Cameron Henning =

Canadian swimmer (born 1960)

Personal information
- Full name: Cameron John Henning
- Nickname: "Cam"
- National team: Canada
- Born: November 24, 1960 (age 65) Edmonton, Alberta
- Height: 1.88 m (6 ft 2 in)
- Weight: 84 kg (185 lb)

Sport
- Sport: Swimming
- Strokes: Backstroke
- Club: Edmonton Keyano Swim Club
Medal record
Men's swimming
Representing Canada
Olympic Games
Bronze medal – third place	1984 Los Angeles	200 m backstroke
Commonwealth Games
Gold medal – first place	1982 Brisbane	200m backstroke
Silver medal – second place	1982 Brisbane	100m backstroke

Cameron John Henning (born November 24, 1960) is a Canadian former competitive swimmer, who competed for his native country at the 1984 Summer Olympics in Los Angeles, California. There he won the bronze medal in the men's 200-metre backstroke.

== See also ==
- List of Commonwealth Games medallists in swimming (men)
- List of Olympic medalists in swimming (men)
