= Sandra Dahlmann =

German swimmer

Personal information
- Born: 3 June 1968 (age 58) Gladbeck, West Germany

Sport
- Sport: Swimming

Sandra Dahlmann (born 3 June 1968) is a German former swimmer. She competed in two events at the 1984 Summer Olympics representing West Germany.
