= David Orbell =

Australian swimmer

Personal information
- Full name: David Rodney Orbell
- National team: Australia
- Born: 27 February 1963 (age 63)
- Height: 1.85 m (6 ft 1 in)
- Weight: 125 kg (276 lb)

Sport
- Sport: Swimming
- Strokes: Backstroke
Medal record
Men's swimming
Representing Australia
Commonwealth Games
Silver medal – second place	1982 Brisbane	200 m backstroke

David Rodney Orbell (born 27 February 1963) is an Australian former swimmer who competed in the 1984 Summer Olympics in Los Angeles. Orbell finished sixth in the final of the 200-metre backstroke, and first in the B Final (ninth overall) in the 100-metre backstroke.

== See also ==
- List of Commonwealth Games medallists in swimming (men)
