= Peter Szmidt =

Canadian swimmer (born 1961)

Personal information
- National team: Canada
- Born: August 12, 1961 (age 64) Montreal, Quebec, Canada
- Height: 1.85 m (6 ft 1 in)
- Weight: 81 kg (179 lb)

Sport
- Sport: Swimming
- Strokes: Freestyle
- Club: Pointe-Claire Swim Club; Edmonton Keyano Swim Club
Medal record
Men's swimming
Representing Canada
Pan American Games
Silver medal – second place	1979 San Juan	4×100 m freestyle
Bronze medal – third place	1979 San Juan	400 m freestyle
Bronze medal – third place	1979 San Juan	4×200 m freestyle
Commonwealth Games
Gold medal – first place	1978 Edmonton	4×100 m freestyle
Silver medal – second place	1978 Edmonton	4×200 m freestyle
Silver medal – second place	1982 Brisbane	200 m freestyle
Silver medal – second place	1982 Brisbane	400 m freestyle
Bronze medal – third place	1982 Brisbane	4×100 m freestyle
World University Games
Bronze medal – third place	1983 Edmonton	4×200 m freestyle

Peter Charles Szmidt (born August 12, 1961) is a Canadian swimmer, competing in the freestyle events during the late 1970s and early 1980s.

Szmidt competed at the 1984 Summer Olympics and was supposed to represent his native country at the 1980 Summer Olympics, but did not participate due to the international boycott of the Moscow Games. A resident of Sarnia, Ontario, he won a total number of three medals at the 1979 Pan American Games.

On July 15, 1980, at the Canadian Olympic trials, Szmidt set the world record for 400-meter freestyle with a time of 3:50:49. He held the world record at the time of the 1980 Olympics, in which he did not race due to the boycott. The world record stood for 18 months and was a Canadian record for 20 years.

Szmidt swam in competition with Russian swimmer Vladimir Salnikov, who dominated long-distance freestyle swimming in the late 1970s and early 1980s. Szmidt's 400-metre record was the only interruption in Salnikov's title as the world record-holder for 400-meter freestyle from 1979 through 1985.

At the 1984 Summer Olympics, Szmidt was a member of the Canadian Men's 4 × 200 metre freestyle relay and finished fifth in the final.

== See also ==
- List of Commonwealth Games medallists in swimming (men)
- World record progression 400 metres freestyle

Records
Preceded by Vladimir Salnikov	Men's 400 metres freestyle world record holder (long course); 15 July 1980 – 12 March 1982	Succeeded by Vladimir Salnikov
