= Mike West (swimmer) =

Canadian swimmer

Personal information
- Full name: Michael West
- Nickname: "Mike"
- National team: Canada
- Born: August 4, 1964 (age 61) Kitchener, Ontario
- Height: 1.91 m (6 ft 3 in)
- Weight: 77 kg (170 lb)

Sport
- Sport: Swimming
- Strokes: Backstroke
- Club: Region of Waterloo
Medal record
Men's swimming
Representing Canada
Olympic Games
Silver medal – second place	1984 Los Angeles	4x100 m medley
Bronze medal – third place	1984 Los Angeles	100 m backstroke
Pan Pacific Games
Silver medal – second place	1985 Tokyo	100 m backstroke
Silver medal – second place	1985 Tokyo	200 m backstroke
Pan American Games
Silver medal – second place	1983 Caracas	4x100 m medley
Bronze medal – third place	1983 Caracas	100 m backstroke
Bronze medal – third place	1983 Caracas	200 m backstroke
Commonwealth Games
Gold medal – first place	1982 Brisbane	100 m backstroke
Bronze medal – third place	1982 Brisbane	200 m backstroke
Summer Universiade
Gold medal – first place	1983 Edmonton	100 m backstroke
Bronze medal – third place	1983 Edmonton	200 m backstroke
Bronze medal – third place	1985 Kobe	200 m backstroke

Michael West (born August 4, 1964) is a former backstroke swimmer from Canada, who competed for his native country at the 1984 Summer Olympics in Los Angeles, California. There he won the silver medal in the men's 4x100-metre medley relay, and the bronze medal in the 100-metre backstroke.

== See also ==
- List of Commonwealth Games medallists in swimming (men)
- List of Olympic medalists in swimming (men)
