= Jason Plummer (swimmer) =

Australian swimmer (1969–2021)

Personal information
- Full name: Jason Robert Plummer
- National team: Australia
- Born: 3 March 1969
- Died: 15 November 2021 (aged 52)
- Height: 1.93 m (6 ft 4 in)
- Weight: 75 kg (165 lb)

Sport
- Sport: Swimming
- Strokes: Freestyle
- Club: St. Peters Swim Club
- College team: Stanford University
Medal record
Men's swimming
Representing Australia
Pan Pacific Championships
Bronze medal – third place	1987 Brisbane	400m freestyle
Bronze medal – third place	1987 Brisbane	1500m freestyle
Commonwealth Games
Gold medal – first place	1986 Edinburgh	1500m freestyle

Jason Robert Plummer (3 March 1969 – 15 November 2021) was an Australian freestyle swimmer, who competed at the 1988 Summer Olympics in Seoul.

Plummer was a member of the St. Peters Swim Club in Brisbane. At the 1985 National Championships he won silver in 400m, 800m and 1500m freestyle finishing behind fellow Queenslander Michael McKenzie in all three events. The following year at the Edinburgh Commonwealth Games he won his pet event, the 1500m freestyle, over McKenzie and Christopher Chalmers from Canada. He backed up his Commonwealth gold with a national title in 1987 in the 1500m, also taking bronze in the 200m and 400m freestyle. Later that year he won bronze in the 400m and 1500m at his home Pan Pacific Championships. At the Seoul Olympics he failed to qualify for the final in the 1500m and was part of the 4 × 200 m freestyle relay team that finished fourth behind the US, East Germany and West Germany.

In 1987 Plummer won the Surf Race Championship of Australia at Scarborough Beach, WA. While representing the Australian National Surf Life Saving Team in 1988, he was crowned World Surf Race Champion at the 1988 Lifesaving World Championships held in Southport, Queensland.

At the age of 20, he moved to America where he studied at Stanford University. He graduated in 1992 with a Bachelor of Arts in psychology. He earned an MBA from the University of California, Los Angeles in 1998.

Plummer was involved in a controversy involving long-time Stanford swimming coach Skip Kenney, as Kenney was suspended indefinitely by Stanford on 9 March 2007 after admitting to deleting from the team media guide the records of Plummer and four other former Stanford swimmers with whom Kenney had disagreements. When asked for comment by the media, Plummer appeared to indicate that he opined that Kenney should be fired.

He resided in Texas with his wife and children. Plummer sold luxury real estate in the Southlake and Westlake areas of Dallas Fort Worth in the United States. He died on 15 November 2021, at the age of 52.

== See also ==
- List of Commonwealth Games medallists in swimming (men)
