= Sarah Kerswell =

British swimmer

Personal information
- Born: 6 August 1965 (age 60)

Sport
- Sport: Swimming

Sarah Kerswell (born 6 August 1965) is a British swimmer. Kerswell competed in the women's 400 metre individual medley at the 1980 Summer Olympics. She represented England in the individual medley events and the 400 metres freestyle, at the 1982 Commonwealth Games in Brisbane, Queensland, Australia.
