= Lisa Forrest =

Australian swimmer

Personal information
- Full name: Lisa Marie Forrest
- National team: Australia
- Born: 9 March 1964 (age 62) Sydney

Sport
- Sport: Swimming
- Strokes: Backstroke
Medal record
Women's swimming
Representing Australia
Commonwealth Games
Gold medal – first place	1982 Brisbane	100 m backstroke
Gold medal – first place	1982 Brisbane	200 m backstroke
Silver medal – second place	1978 Edmonton	200 m backstroke

Lisa Marie Forrest (born 9 March 1964) is an Australian Commonwealth Games dual gold medalist in swimming. After retiring from competitive swimming she was a sports commentator, actor, reporter, writer, and media personality. Forrest appeared on the television talk show Beauty and the Beast and numerous other television shows, and is a 'celebrity' speaker.

== Sporting career ==
Forrest trained with prominent coach Forbes Carlile and later with Terry Gathercole.

=== Commonwealth Games ===
- 1978 silver medal, 200 m backstroke, 1978 Commonwealth Games, Edmonton
- 1982 gold medal, 100 m backstroke, 1982 Commonwealth Games, Brisbane
- 1982 gold medal, 200 m backstroke, 1982 Commonwealth Games, Brisbane

=== Olympic Games ===
At age 16 Forrest was the captain of the Australian swimming team at the 1980 Summer Olympics.

She was a finalist in the women's 4x100-metre medley relay in Swimming at the 1980 Summer Olympics in Moscow.

== Writing ==
Forrest released her first novel, Making The Most Of It, in 2000. A work of fiction, it deals with the sport related problems of eating disorders, drugs, being a sporting celebrity, failure, self-esteem, and relationships. It was added to the recommended reading list for years 7–10 by the NSW Board of Studies.

She continued with fictional works: in 2002 djmAx; and in 2004 Meg Banana, an illustrated novel. In 2008 she published Boycott, a factual work of the story behind Australia's involvement in the 1980 Moscow Olympics. In 2013 she published Inheritance, another fictional work.

== Honours ==
Forrest received an Australian Sports Medal on 30 July 2000.

In 2001, she was inducted into the Northern Beaches Sporting Hall of Fame.

== Personal life ==
She is married to Jesse Todd and has one son.
