= Janet Tibbits =

Australian swimmer

Personal information
- Born: 11 October 1967 (age 58)

Sport
- Sport: Swimming
Medal record
Women's swimming
Representing Australia
Commonwealth Games
Silver medal – second place	1982 Brisbane	100 m butterfly
Silver medal – second place	1982 Brisbane	200 m butterfly

Janet Linda Tibbits (born 11 October 1967) is an Australian swimmer. She competed in three events at the 1984 Summer Olympics.
