= Kim Terrell =

Australian swimmer

Personal information
- Born: 18 October 1962 (age 63)

Sport
- Sport: Swimming

Kim Christopher Terrell (born 18 October 1962) is an Australian swimmer. He competed in the men's 200 metre backstroke at the 1984 Summer Olympics.
