= Susie Baumer =

Australian swimmer

Personal information
- Nationality: Australian
- Born: 31 March 1966 (age 60)

Sport
- Sport: Swimming
- Strokes: Freestyle
Medal record
Women's swimming
Representing Australia
Commonwealth Games
Gold medal – first place	1986 Edinburgh	200 m freestyle
Gold medal – first place	1986 Edinburgh	4×200 m freestyle
Silver medal – second place	1986 Edinburgh	400 m freestyle
Bronze medal – third place	1982 Brisbane	200 m freestyle
Pan Pacific Championships
Silver medal – second place	1987 Brisbane	200 m freestyle
Silver medal – second place	1987 Brisbane	4×200 m freestyle
Bronze medal – third place	1987 Brisbane	400 m freestyle

Susan "Susie" Carol Baumer (born 31 March 1966) is a retired Australian freestyle swimmer. She competed at the 1984 Summer Olympics and the 1988 Summer Olympics.
