= Tim Ford (swimmer) =

Australian swimmer

Sport
- Country: Australia
- Sport: Swimming
- Event: Freestyle
Medal record
Commonwealth Games
Silver medal – second place	1982 Brisbane	1500 metre freestyle

Timothy John Ford is an Australian former freestyle swimmer.

Ford grew up in Sydney, attending Turramurra High School. Due to the distance he lived from the swimming facility he trained at, he would often board with swimmer Shane Gould.

A graduate of Harvard University, Ford was captain of the varsity swim team during his time in Cambridge.

In 1982, Ford won a silver medal in the 1500 metre freestyle at the 1982 Commonwealth Games in Brisbane, finishing behind Max Metzker. He also competed in that year's World Championships in Ecuador.

Ford, a Swimming Australia board member, is married to former swimmer Susie Baumer.
