= Kathy Bald =

Canadian swimmer (born 1963)

Personal information
- Full name: Katherine Ann Bald
- Nickname: "Kathy"
- National team: Canada
- Born: December 19, 1963 (age 62) Etobicoke, Ontario
- Height: 1.72 m (5 ft 8 in)
- Weight: 58 kg (128 lb)

Sport
- Sport: Swimming
- Strokes: Breaststroke
- College team: University of Toronto
Medal record
Women's swimming
Representing Canada
Pan American Games
Gold medal – first place	1983 Caracas	200 m breaststroke
Silver medal – second place	1983 Caracas	100 m breaststroke
Silver medal – second place	1983 Caracas	4x100 m freestyle
Bronze medal – third place	1983 Caracas	100 m freestyle
Commonwealth Games
Gold medal – first place	1982 Brisbane	100 m breaststroke
Silver medal – second place	1982 Brisbane	200 m breaststroke

Katherine Ann Bald (born December 19, 1963) is a former competitive freestyle swimmer from Canada. She was affiliated with the University of Toronto.

Bald competed for her native country at the 1988 Summer Olympics in Seoul, South Korea. There she finished in sixth position in the women's 4x100-metre freestyle relay, with her teammates Patricia Noall, Andrea Nugent and Jane Kerr.

Bald won a gold medal in the 100-metre breaststroke and a silver in the 200-metre breaststroke at the 1982 Commonwealth Games in Brisbane, Australia. At the 1983 Pan American Games in Caracas, Venezuela, she won a gold medal in the 200-metre breaststroke, silver medals in the 100-metre breaststroke and 4x100-metre freestyle relay, and a bronze in the 100-metre freestyle.
