= Maureen New =

Canadian swimmer

Personal information
- Born: 28 December 1963 (age 62) Edmonton, Alberta, Canada

Sport
- Sport: Swimming
Medal record
Women's swimming
Representing Canada
Commonwealth Games
Gold medal – first place	1982 Brisbane	4×100 m medley

Maureen New (born 28 December 1963) is a Canadian swimmer. She competed in the women's 4 × 100 metre freestyle relay at the 1984 Summer Olympics.
