= Audrey Moore (swimmer) =

Australian swimmer

Personal information
- Nationality: Australian
- Born: 19 September 1964 (age 61)

Sport
- Sport: Swimming
Medal record
Women's swimming
Representing Australia
Commonwealth Games
Bronze medal – third place	1982 Brisbane	100 m backstroke

Audrey Helen Moore (born 19 September 1964) is an Australian swimmer. She competed in three events at the 1984 Summer Olympics. She also won a bronze medal in the 100 m backstroke at the 1982 Commonwealth Games.
