= Jon Sieben =

Australian swimmer

Personal information
- Full name: Jonathan Scott Sieben
- Nickname: "Jon"
- National team: Australia
- Born: 24 August 1966 (age 59) Brisbane, Queensland
- Height: 1.73 m (5 ft 8 in)
- Weight: 74 kg (163 lb)

Sport
- Sport: Swimming
- Strokes: Butterfly
- College team: University of Alabama
Medal record
Men's swimming
Representing Australia
Olympic Games
Gold medal – first place	1984 Los Angeles	200 m butterfly
Bronze medal – third place	1984 Los Angeles	4×100 m medley
Pan Pacific Games
Silver medal – second place	1985 Tokyo	100 m butterfly
Silver medal – second place	1985 Tokyo	4×100 m medley
Silver medal – second place	1987 Brisbane	100 m butterfly
Bronze medal – third place	1987 Brisbane	4×100m medley
Bronze medal – third place	1991 Edmonton	4×100m medley
Commonwealth Games
Gold medal – first place	1982 Brisbane	4×100 m medley
Bronze medal – third place	1982 Brisbane	200 m butterfly
Summer Universiade
Gold medal – first place	1985 Kobe	100 m butterfly

Jonathan Scott Sieben, OAM (born 24 August 1966) is an Australian former butterfly swimmer of the 1980s, who won gold in the 200-metre butterfly at the 1984 Summer Olympics in Los Angeles.

== Early years ==
Sieben was born in Brisbane, Queensland. He attended Brisbane State High School.

== Career ==
Sieben was coached by Laurie Lawrence, and made his debut at the young age of 15 at the 1982 Commonwealth Games in Brisbane, where he captured a bronze in the 200-metre butterfly, as well as gold in the medley relay. Sieben and Lawrence continued their preparation for Los Angeles, but were given little chance. Sieben was known to his friends as The Shrimp, as he stood just 173 cm, in contrast to the dominant swimmer of the time, West Germany's Michael Gross, the world record holder, known as The Albatross with his 201 cm frame and 213 cm wingspan. He also faced the 100-metre butterfly world record holder, the United States' Pablo Morales. Sieben swam in the wake of Gross and Morales in the first 150 metres, before storming home in the last 50 metres to claim the gold medal in a world record time of 1 m 57.04 s, more than four seconds faster than he had ever swum before. He also collected a bronze medal after swimming in the preliminaries of the medley relay. He was named the Young Australian of the Year in 1984.

By the 1988 Summer Olympics in Seoul, Sieben's ability had waned, and the selectors did not choose him for the 200 m butterfly. He finished fourth in the 100-metre butterfly. He continued onto the 1992 Summer Olympics in Barcelona, but failed to reach the final of the 100-metre butterfly individual event. He formed part of Australia's 4x100-metre medley relay team that finished 7th in the final, in a national record time of 3:42.65.

Sieben was inducted into the Sport Australia Hall of Fame in 1985.

In 2020 Sieben was involved in the construction of the North Queensland Cowboys' Community, Training and High Performance Centre commissioning the pools for Chris Williams and Hutchinson Builders.

== See also ==
- List of Commonwealth Games medallists in swimming (men)
- List of Olympic medalists in swimming (men)
- World record progression 200 metres butterfly

== Bibliography ==
- Andrews, Malcolm (2000). Australia at the Olympic Games. Sydney, New South Wales: ABC Books. p. 397. ISBN 0-7333-0884-8.
- Howell, Max (1986). Aussie Gold. Albion, Queensland: Brooks Waterloo. pp. 257–261. ISBN 0-86440-680-0.

Records
Preceded by Michael Gross	Men's 200 metre butterfly world record holder (long course); 3 August 1984 – 29 June 1985	Succeeded by Michael Gross
