= Anne Ottenbrite =

Canadian swimmer

Personal information
- National team: Canada
- Born: May 12, 1966 (age 60) Bowmanville, Ontario, Canada
- Height: 175 cm (5 ft 9 in)
- Weight: 60 kg (132 lb)

Sport
- Sport: Swimming
- Strokes: Breaststroke
- Club: Ajax Aquatic Club, Coach - Paul Meronen
- College team: University of Southern California
Medal record
Women's swimming
Representing Canada
Olympic Games
Gold medal – first place	1984 Los Angeles	200 m breaststroke
Silver medal – second place	1984 Los Angeles	100 m breaststroke
Bronze medal – third place	1984 Los Angeles	4x100 m medley
World Championships (LC)
Silver medal – second place	1982 Guayaquil	100 m breaststroke
Bronze medal – third place	1982 Guayaquil	200 m breaststroke
Pan American Games
Gold medal – first place	1983 Caracas	100 m breaststroke
Silver medal – second place	1983 Caracas	4×100 m medley
Commonwealth Games
Gold medal – first place	1982 Brisbane	200 m breaststroke
Gold medal – first place	1982 Brisbane	4×100 m medley
Silver medal – second place	1982 Brisbane	100 m breaststroke

Anne Ottenbrite (born May 12, 1966) is a Canadian former breaststroke swimmer, who won three medals at the 1984 Summer Olympics in Los Angeles: gold (200-metre breaststroke), silver (100-metre breaststroke), and bronze (4×100-metre medley relay). In the last event she was accompanied by Reema Abdo, Michelle MacPherson and Pamela Rai.

Ottenbrite attended the University of Southern California, and swam or the USC Trojans swimming and diving team.

== See also ==
- List of members of the International Swimming Hall of Fame
- List of Olympic medalists in swimming (women)
