= Paul Rowe (swimmer) =

New Zealand-born Australian swimmer

Personal information
- Born: Paul Colin Rowe

Sport
- Country: New Zealand; Australia
- Sport: Swimming
- Event: Freestyle / Butterfly
Medal record
Commonwealth Games
Representing Australia
Gold medal – first place	1982 Brisbane	4 x 200 m freestyle
Silver medal – second place	1982 Brisbane	200 m butterfly

Paul Colin Rowe is a New Zealand-born Australian former swimmer of the 1970s and 1980s.

Born in New Zealand, Rowe won national titles in his native country for butterfly and freestyle. He represented New Zealand at the 1978 Commonwealth Games in Edmonton, coming fourth in the 100 metre butterfly.

Rowe came to Australia in 1979 for training in the lead up to the 1980 Moscow Olympics, where he had been due to swim for the New Zealand delegation. New Zealand ended up boycotting the games and in 1981 he became a naturalised Australian. At the 1982 Commonwealth Games in Brisbane, he was a member of the Australian gold medal-winning 4 × 200 m freestyle relay team, as well as a silver medalist in the 200 metre butterfly.

In 1986, Rowe retired from competitive swimming and made a switch to water polo.

Rowe is a cousin of swimmer Mark Treffers and uncle of swimmer Ben Treffers.
