= Georgina Parkes =

Australian swimmer

Personal information
- Full name: Georgina Louise Parkes
- National team: Australia
- Born: 30 May 1965 (age 61)
- Height: 1.81 m (5 ft 11 in)
- Weight: 67 kg (148 lb)

Sport
- Sport: Swimming
- Strokes: Backstroke
Medal record
Women's swimming
Representing Australia
World Championships
Silver medal – second place	1982 Guayaquil	200 m backstroke
Pan Pacific Swimming Championships
Bronze medal – third place	1985 Tokyo	100 m backstroke
Silver medal – second place	1985 Tokyo	200 m backstroke
Commonwealth Games
Silver medal – second place	1982 Brisbane	100 m backstroke
Silver medal – second place	1982 Brisbane	200 m backstroke
Bronze medal – third place	1986 Edinburgh	4×100 m medley
Silver medal – second place	1986 Edinburgh	100 m backstroke
Gold medal – first place	1986 Edinburgh	200 m backstroke

Georgina Louise Parkes (born 30 May 1965) is an Australian former competitive swimmer who won a silver medal in the 200-metre backstroke at the 1982 World Aquatics Championships. She also competed in four events at the 1980 and 1984 Summer Olympics, with the best achievement of fourth place in the 200-metre backstroke in 1984.

== See also ==
- List of World Aquatics Championships medalists in swimming (women)
