= Reema Abdo =

Canadian swimmer (born 1963)

Personal information
- Full name: Reema Abdo
- National team: Canada
- Born: May 19, 1963 (age 63) Aden, Federation of South Arabia
- Height: 1.73 m (5 ft 8 in)
- Weight: 59 kg (130 lb)

Sport
- Sport: Swimming
- Strokes: Backstroke
- Club: Trenton Dolphins
Medal record
Women's swimming
Representing Canada
Olympic Games
Bronze medal – third place	1984 Los Angeles	4x100 m medley

Reema Abdo (born May 19, 1963) is a Canadian former backstroke swimmer and Olympic bronze medallist. Abdo was born in Aden, in the Federation of South Arabia, and became a naturalized Canadian citizen.

== Swimming career ==
Abdo began her swimming career in Kingston, Ontario, at age 12. In 1976 she moved, with her family, to Trenton, Ontario, and joined Trenton Dolphin Swim Club, where coach George Sulk trained her.

Over her career Abdo garnered a total of 14 national championship medals: 7 Gold, 4 Silver and 3 Bronze - all in her specialty, the backstroke. In 1984 she was the Canadian record holder in the short course 100-metre and 200-metre backstroke.

Abdo represented Canada at the USSR-Germany-Canada Tri-meet, the Commonwealth Games, the World University Games, the Pan Pacific Championships and the 1984 Summer Olympics in Los Angeles, where she won a bronze medal in the 4 × 100 m medley relay with teammates Anne Ottenbrite, Michelle MacPherson and Pamela Rai.

== Olympics ==
Competed for Canada at the 1984 Summer Olympics in Los Angeles, California. There she won the bronze medal in the 4x100-metre medley relay, alongside Anne Ottenbrite, Michelle MacPherson and Pamela Rai.

== Coaching ==
Abdo attended both Arizona State University and the University of Toronto and following her exceptional swimming career, she coached swimming for several years where she was a successful age-group and university coach. She continues an active lifestyle competing in triathlons and long-distance running. Abdo is a member of the Ontario Provincial Police, out of Prince Edward.

== See also ==
- List of Olympic medalists in swimming (women)
