= Aquatics at the 1982 Commonwealth Games =

- Venue: Chandler Aquatic Centre
- Location: Brisbane, Australia
- Dates: 30 September to 9 October 1982

Aquatics at the 1982 Commonwealth Games was the 12th appearances of both Swimming at the Commonwealth Games and Diving at the Commonwealth Games. Competition featured 4 diving events and 29 swimming events, held in Brisbane, Australia, from 30 September to 9 October 1982.

The events at the Games were held at the new Chandler Aquatic Centre that was part of the Sleeman Sports Complex, which had been purpose-built for the games.

Australia topped the medal table with 15 gold medals.

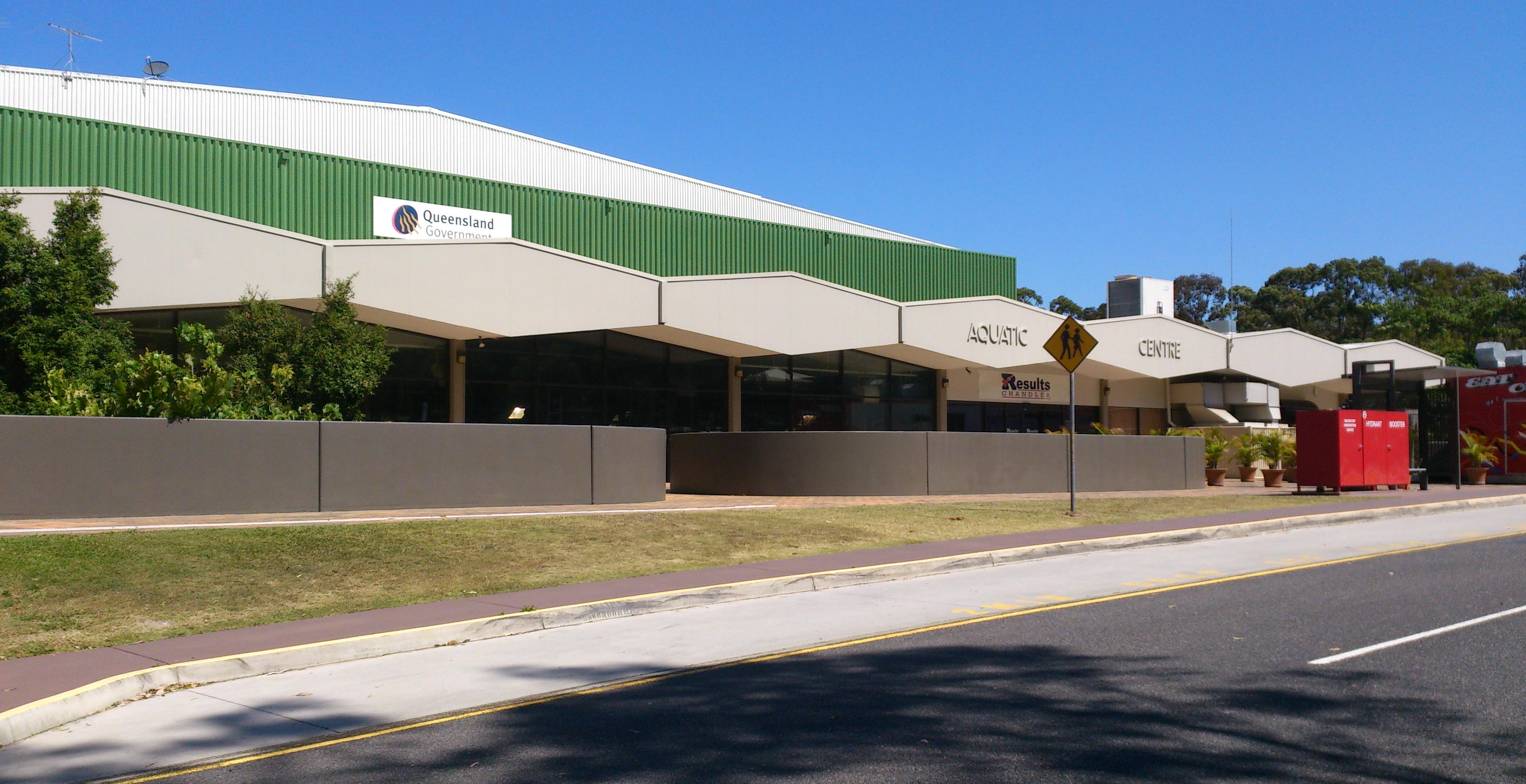
The Aquatic Centre exterior in 2017

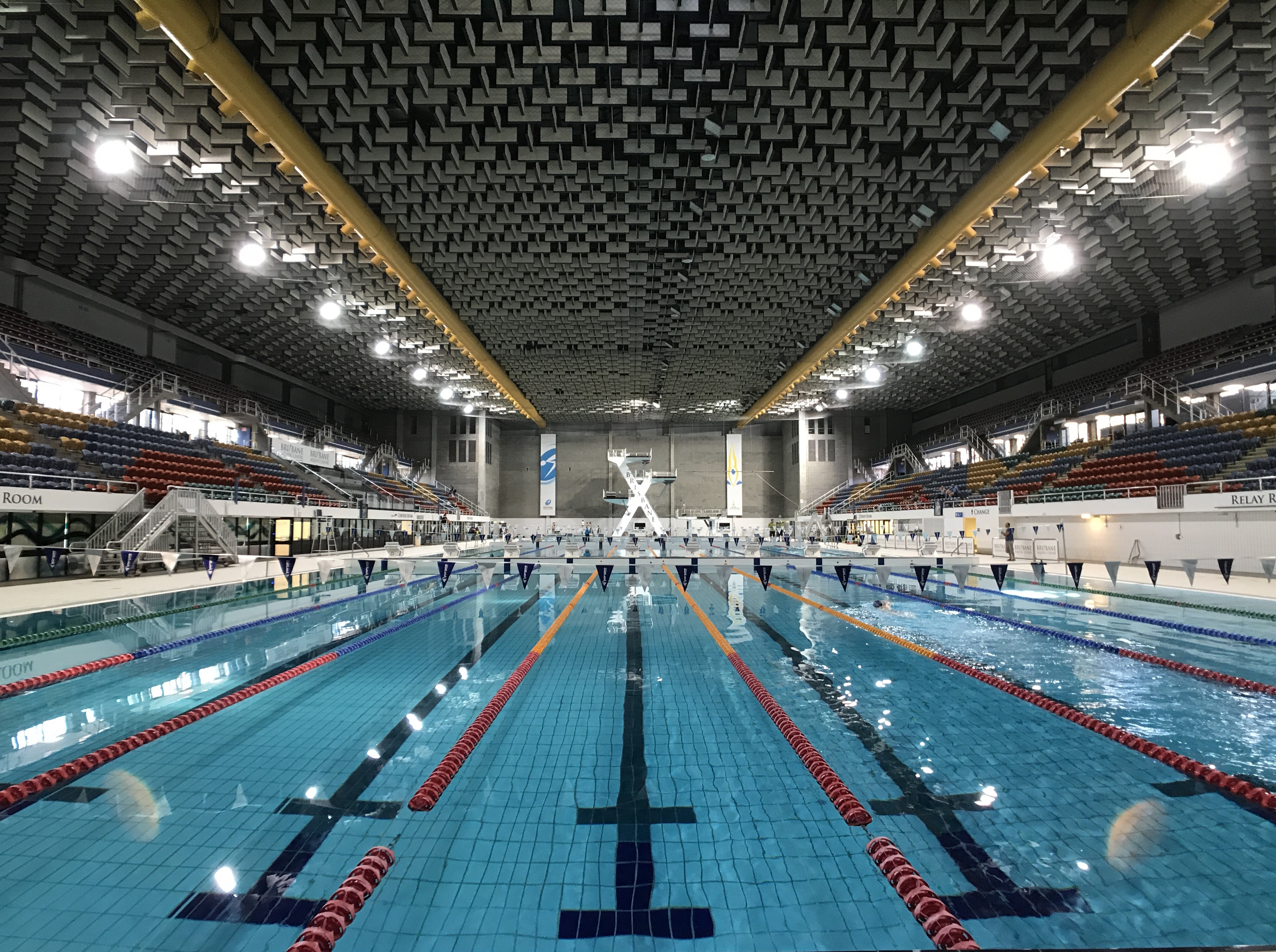
The Brisbane pool in 2017

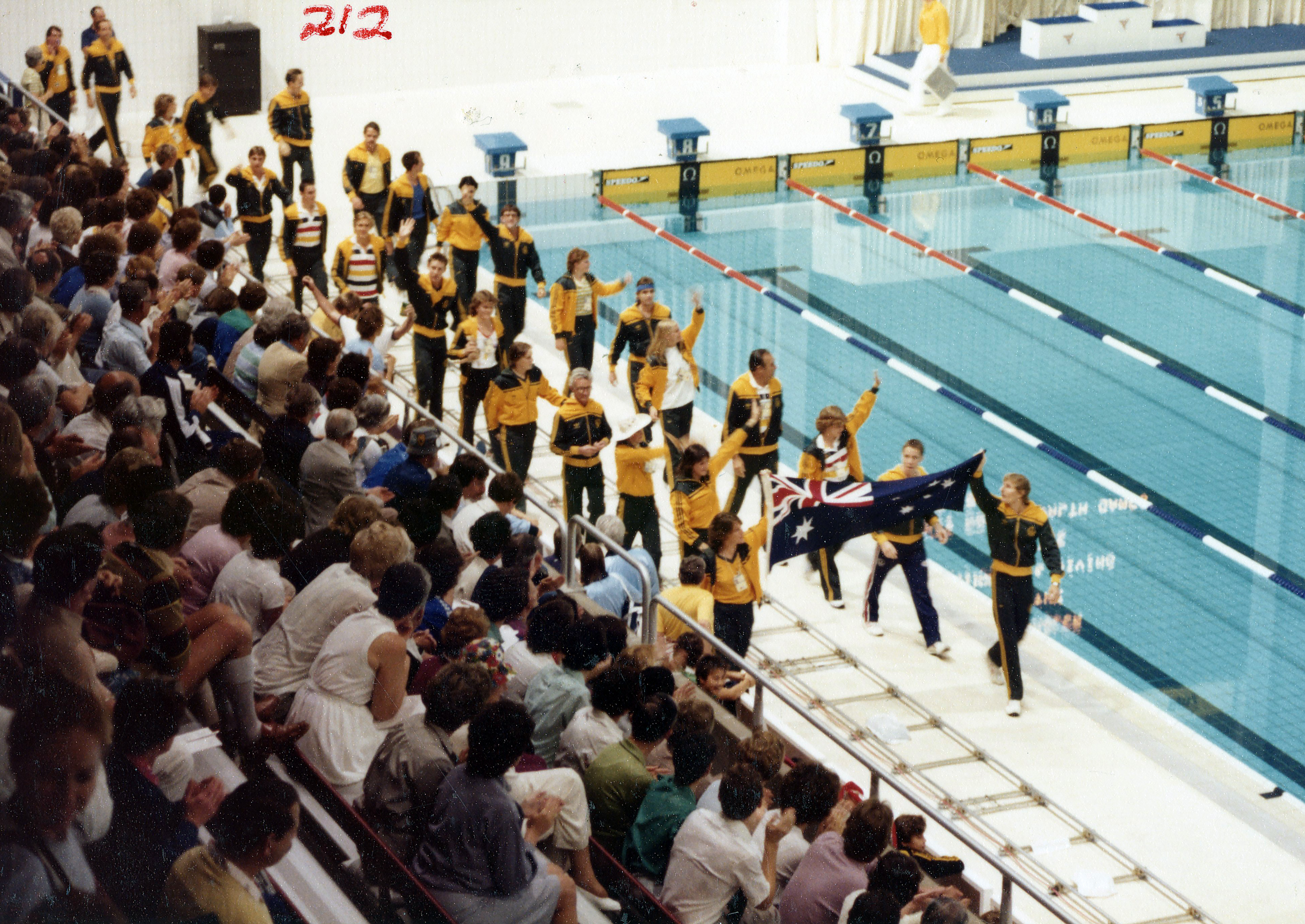
The Australian team enter the centre

== Medal table (all aquatics events) ==
* Host nation (Australia)

| Rank | Nation | Gold | Silver | Bronze | Total |
|---|---|---|---|---|---|
| 1 | Australia* | 15 | 15 | 9 | 39 |
| 2 | Canada | 9 | 9 | 11 | 29 |
| 3 | England | 9 | 7 | 8 | 24 |
| 4 | Scotland | 0 | 2 | 3 | 5 |
| 5 | New Zealand | 0 | 0 | 2 | 2 |
| Totals (5 entries) | | 33 | 33 | 33 | 99 |
