= Swimming at the 1986 Commonwealth Games =

- Venue: Royal Commonwealth Pool
- Location: Edinburgh, Scotland
- Date: 24 July to 2 August 1986

Swimming at the 1986 Commonwealth Games was the 13th appearance of Swimming at the Commonwealth Games.

Competition featured 30 swimming events and was held in Edinburgh, Scotland, from 24 July to 2 August 1986.

The events were held at the Royal Commonwealth Pool, which also hosted the events in 1970.

Australia topped the medal table with 11 gold medals.

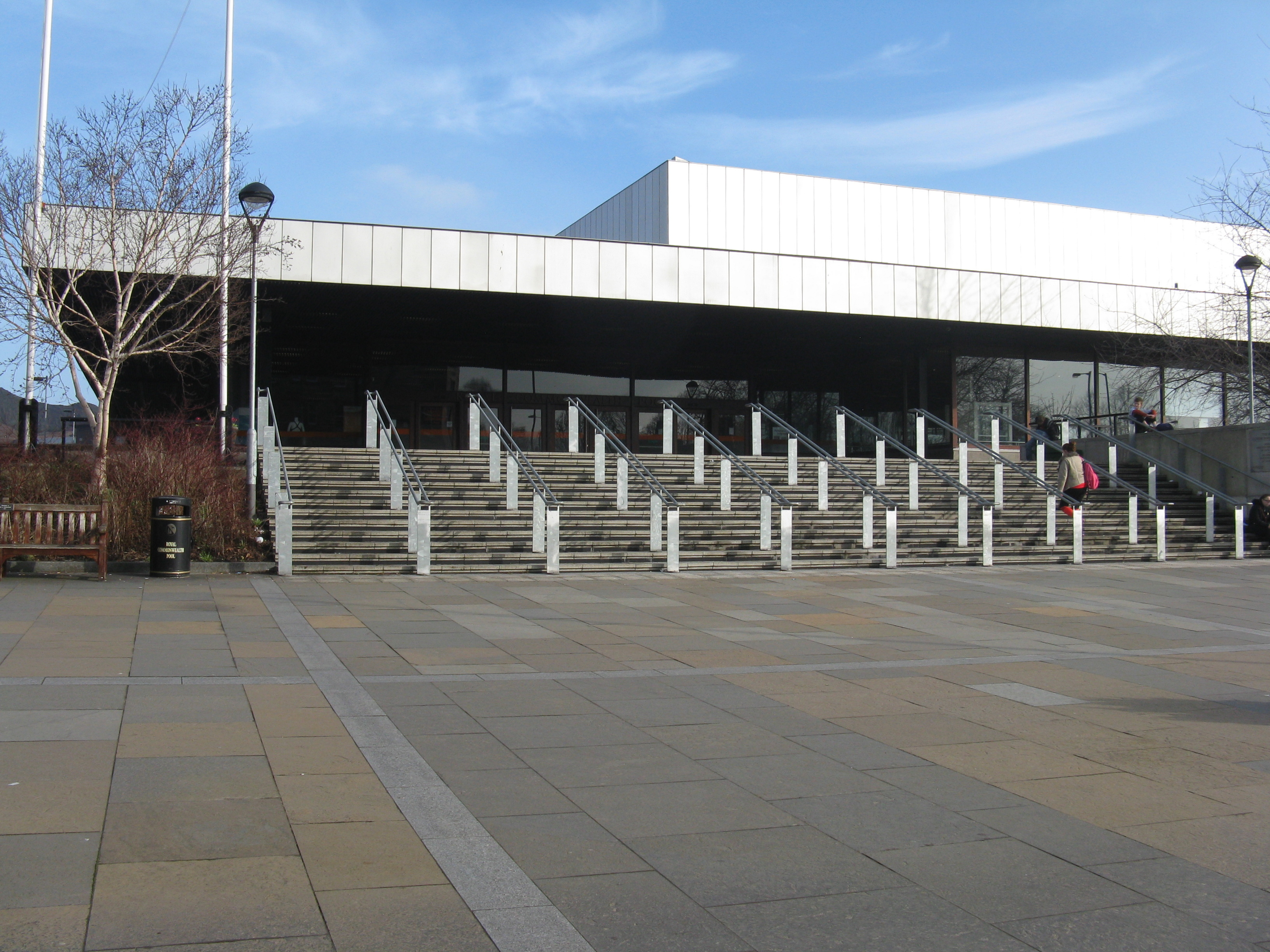
The Royal Commonwealth Pool

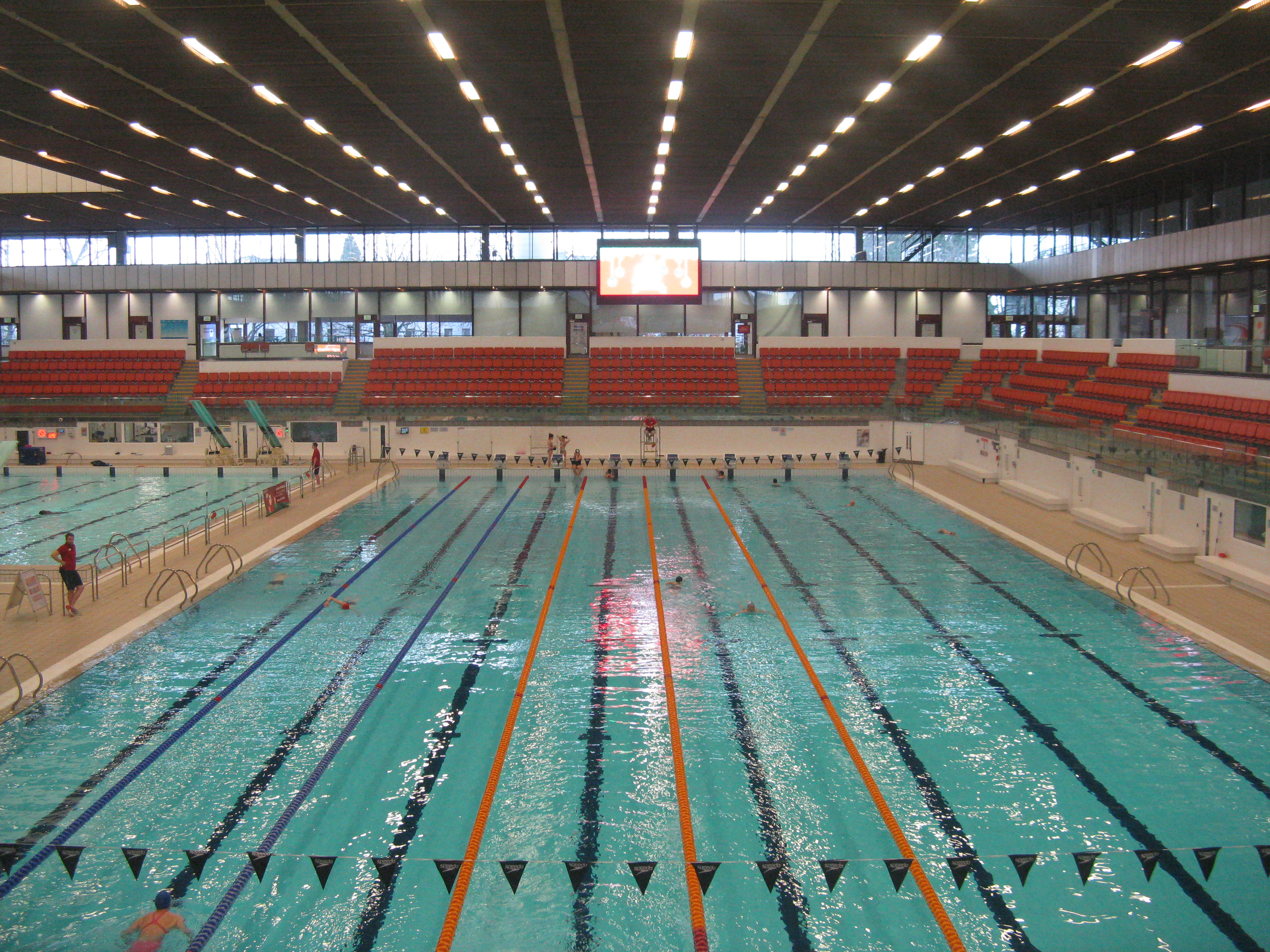
The pool in 2015

== Medal table ==
* Host nation (Scotland)

Rank	Nation	Gold	Silver	Bronze	Total
1	Australia	11	11	11	33
2	Canada	11	7	7	25
3	England	6	7	9	22
4	New Zealand	2	3	1	6
5	Scotland*	0	2	2	4
Totals (5 entries)		30	30	30	90

== Medallists ==
Men

Event	Gold	Silver	Bronze
100 m freestyle	Greg Fasala; Australia	Neil Brooks; Australia	Andy Jameson; England
200 m freestyle	Robert Gleria; Australia	Peter Dale; Australia	Thomas Stachewicz; Australia
400 m freestyle	Duncan Armstrong; Australia	Kevin Boyd; England	Mike Davidson; New Zealand
1500 m freestyle	Jason Plummer; Australia	Michael McKenzie; Australia	Chris Chalmers; Canada
100 m backstroke	Mark Tewksbury; Canada	Paul Kingsman; New Zealand	Mike West; Canada
200 m backstroke	Sandy Goss; Canada	Paul Kingsman; New Zealand	Sean Murphy; Canada
100 m breaststroke	Victor Davis; Canada	Adrian Moorhouse; England	Brett Stocks; Australia
200 m breaststroke	Adrian Moorhouse; England	Victor Davis; Canada	Nick Gillingham; England
100 m butterfly	Andy Jameson; England	Anthony Mosse; New Zealand	Tom Ponting; Canada
200 m butterfly	Anthony Mosse; New Zealand	Tom Ponting; Canada	Nick Hodgson; England
200 m individual medley	Alex Baumann; Canada	Rob Woodhouse; Australia	Neil Cochran; Scotland
400 m individual medley	Alex Baumann; Canada	Rob Woodhouse; Australia	Steve Poulter; England
4 × 100 m freestyle relay	Australia; Greg Fasala (50.81) CGR; Matthew Renshaw; Mark Stockwell; Neil Brooks	Canada; Vlastimil Černý (51.06); Sandy Goss (50.66); Blair Hicken (50.92); Alex Baumann (50.34)	England; Andy Jameson; Mark Foster; Geoffrey Stewart; Roland Lee
4 × 200 m freestyle relay	Australia; Duncan Armstrong; Peter Dale; Roberto Gleria; Thomas Stachewicz	Canada; Paul Szekula; Sandy Goss; Scott Flowers; Tom Ponting	England; John Davey; Jonathan Broughton; Kevin Boyd; Paul Howe
4 × 100 m medley relay	Canada; Mark Tewksbury; Victor Davis; Tom Ponting; Alex Baumann; Heat swimmers Mike West; Darcy Wallingford; Claude Lamy; Sandy Goss	England; Neil Harper; Adrian Moorhouse; Andy Jameson; Roland Lee; Heat swimmers Nick Gillingham	Australia; Carl Wilson; Brett Stocks; Barry Armstrong; Greg Fasala

Women

Event	Gold	Silver	Bronze
100 m freestyle	Jane Kerr; Canada	Angela Harris; Australia	Nicola Fibbens; England
200 m freestyle	Susie Baumer; Australia	Jane Kerr; Canada	Ruth Gilfillan; Scotland
400 m freestyle	Sarah Hardcastle; England	Susie Baumer; Australia	Jenni Burke; Australia
800 m freestyle	Sarah Hardcastle; England	Julie McDonald; Australia	Jenni Burke; Australia
100 m backstroke	Sylvia Hume; New Zealand	Georgina Parkes; Australia	Nicole Livingstone; Australia
200 m backstroke	Georgina Parkes; Australia	Kathy Read; England	Jodi McGibbon; Australia
100 m breaststroke	Allison Higson; Canada	Jean Hill; Scotland	Dimity Douglas; Australia
200 m breaststroke	Allison Higson; Canada	Cindy Õunpuu; Canada	Dimity Douglas; Australia
100 m butterfly	Caroline Cooper; England	Caroline Foot; England	Samantha Purvis; England
200 m butterfly	Donna McGinnis; Canada	Karen Phillips; Australia	Jill Horstead; Canada
200 m individual medley	Suzanne Landells; Australia	Jean Hill; Scotland	Jane Kerr; Canada
400 m individual medley	Suzanne Landells; Australia	Jodie Clatworthy; Australia	Sarah Hardcastle; England
4 × 100 m freestyle relay	Canada; Andrea Nugent; Jane Kerr; Pamela Rai; Patricia Noall	England; Annabelle Cripps; Caroline Cooper; Nicola Fibbens; Zara Long	Australia; Angela Harris; Jacqueline Grant; Julie Pugh; Sarah Thorpe
4 × 200 m freestyle relay	Australia; Jenni Burke; Michelle Pearson; Sarah Thorpe; Susie Baumer	England; Annabelle Cripps; Karen Mellor; Sarah Hardcastle; Zara Long	Canada; Donna McGinnis; Jane Kerr; Patricia Noall; Sophie Dufour
4 × 100 m medley relay	England; Caroline Cooper; Nicola Fibbens; Simone Hindmarch; Suki Brownsdon	Canada; Allison Higson; Barbara McBain; Donna McGinnis; Jane Kerr	Australia; Angela Harris; Dimity Douglas; Georgina Parkes; Karen Phillips

== Finals ==
Men

=== 100m freestyle ===
Pos	Athlete	Time
1	(Australia) Greg Fasala	50.95
2	(Australia) Neil Brooks	51.18
3	(England) Andy Jameson	51.21
4	(Canada) Sandy Goss	51.45
5	(England) Roland Lee	51.47
6	(Canada) Vlastimil Černý	51.53
7	(Australia) Mark Stockwell	51.61
7	(Canada) Blair Hicken	51.61

=== 200m freestyle ===
Pos	Athlete	Time
1	(Australia) Roberto Gleria	1:50.57
2	(Australia) Peter Dale	1:51.16
3	(Australia) Thomas Stachewicz	1:51.21
4	(Canada) Tom Ponting	1:52.37
5	(Scotland) Neil Cochran	1:52.49
6	(England) Kevin Boyd	1:52.75
7	(Canada) Scott Flowers	1:53.76
8	(England) Paul Howe	1:54.55

=== 400m freestyle ===
Pos	Athlete	Time
1	(Australia) Duncan Armstrong	3:52.25
2	(England) Kevin Boyd	3:55.00
3	(New Zealand) Mike Davidson	3:56.96
4	(Canada) Scott Flowers	3:57.43
5	(England) John Davey	3:57.55
6	(Wales) Tony Day	3:58.20
7	(Canada) Chris Bowie	3:58.28
8	(Canada) Turlough O'Hare	3:58.33

=== 1500m freestyle ===
Pos	Athlete	Time
1	(Australia) Jason Plummer	15:12.62
2	(Canada) Michael McKenzie	15:12.72
3	(Canada) Chris Chalmers	15:18.05
4	(Wales) Tony Day	15:22.76
5	(Canada) Harry Taylor	15:24.45
6	(New Zealand) Mike Davidson	15:38.54
7	(Scotland) Duncan Cruickshank	15:44.73
8	(England) David Stacey	15:48.02

=== 100m backstroke ===
Pos	Athlete	Time
1	(Canada) Mark Tewksbury	56.45
2	(New Zealand) Paul Kingsman	57.17
3	(Canada) Mike West	57.46
4	(Canada) Sean Murphy	57.93
5	(Australia) Carl Wilson	58.28
6	(England) Neil Harper	58.62
7	(Australia) Thomas Stachewicz	58.64
8	(Scotland) Neil Cochran	58.82

=== 200m backstroke ===
Pos	Athlete	Time
1	(Canada) Sandy Goss	2:02.55
2	(New Zealand) Paul Kingsman	2:02.90
3	(Canada) Sean Murphy	2:03.05
4	(England) Gary Binfield	2:04.54
5	(Canada) Michael West	2:04.86
6	(Australia) David Orbell	2:05.59
7	(Scotland) Neil Cochran	2:06.52
8	(New Zealand) Kirk Torrance	2:07.79

=== 100m breaststroke ===
Pos	Athlete	Time
1	(Canada) Victor Davis	1:03.0
2	(England) Adrian Moorhouse	1:03.09
3	(Australia) Brett Stocks	1:03.75
4	(Australia) Rodney Lawson	1:04.72
5	(Scotland) Gary Watson	1:05.20
6	(Scotland) Iain Campbell	1:05.30
7	(Canada) Darcy Wallingford	1:05.61
8	(New Zealand) Grant Forbes	1:06.34

=== 200m breaststroke ===
Pos	Athlete	Time
1	(England) Adrian Moorhouse	2:16.35
2	(Canada) Victor Davis	2:16.70
3	(England) Nick Gillingham	2:20.46
4	(Canada) Alex Baumann	2:20.83
5	(Australia) Rodney Lawson	2:20.87
6	(Scotland) Iain Campbell	2:21.31
7	(England) Murray Buswell	2:21.48
8	(Australia) Brett Stocks	2:23.29

=== 100m butterfly ===
Pos	Athlete	Time
1	(England) Andy Jameson	54.07
2	(New Zealand) Anthony Mosse	54.31
3	(Canada) Tom Ponting	54.56
4	(Australia) Barry James Armstrong	54.85
5	(Australia) Anthony James McDonald	55.31
6	(Canada) Vlastimil Černý	55.74
7	(New Zealand) Ross Anderson	55.93
8	(England) Nick Hodgson	56.28

=== 200m butterfly ===
Pos	Athlete	Time
1	(New Zealand) Anthony Mosse	1:57.27
2	(Canada) Tom Ponting	1:58.54
3	(England) Nick Hodgson	2:00.50
4	(Australia) Peter Gilbert Gee	2:00.93
5	(Canada) Vlastimil Černý	2:01.33
6	(Australia) Anthony James McDonald	2:01.46
7	(England) Steve Poulter	2:02.24
8	(New Zealand) Ross Anderson	2:02.96

=== 200m medley ===
Pos	Athlete	Time
1	(Canada) Alex Baumann	2:01.80
2	(Australia) Rob Woodhouse	2:04.19
3	(Scotland) Neil Cochran	2:04.34
4	(England) John Davey	2:05.67
5	(Canada) Victor Davis	2:05.75
6	(England) Gary Binfield	2:06.57
7	(Canada) Rob Chernoff	2:08.01
8	(Australia) Anthony James McDonald	2:08.44

=== 400m medley ===
Pos	Athlete	Time
1	(Canada) Alex Baumann	4:18.29
2	(Australia) Rob Woodhouse	4:22.51
3	(England) Steve Poulter	4:24.71
4	(England) John Davey	4:27.03
5	(Canada) Jon Kelly	4:27.26
6	(England) Gary Binfield	4:29.51
7	(Wales) Tony Day	4:30.02
8	(Canada) Deke Botsford	4:33.05

=== 4x100m freestyle relay ===
Pos	Athlete	Time
1	(Australia) Fasala, Renshaw, Stockwell, Brooks	3:21.58
2	(Canada) Černý, Goss, Hicken, Baumann	3:22.98
3	(England) Jameson, Foster, Stewart, Lee	3:25.01
4	(Scotland) Bole, Wilson, Cochran, Brew	3:29.79
5	(Singapore) Lim, Gee Oon, Tay, Siong	3:32.62
6	(Hong Kong) Hor Man Yip, Li, Coak, Yi Ming Tsang	3:38.60
7	(Eswatini) Stapley, Diamond, Nissiotis, Ncala	3:58.42
8	(Gibraltar) Lopez, Golding, Martinez, Vinales	4:02.60

=== 4x200m freestyle relay ===
Pos	Athlete	Time
1	(Australia) Armstrong, Dale, Gleria, Stachewicz	7:23.49
2	(Canada) Szekula, Goss, Flowers, Ponting	7:29.52
3	(England) Davey, Broughton, Boyd, Howe	7:33.39
4	(Scotland) Bole, Wilson, Cochran, Brew	7:36.31
5	(Wales) Gwynne, Rosser, Perry, Day	7:54.98
6	(Singapore) Lim, Gee Oon, Khoon Hean Tay, Teik Oon	8:03.28

=== 4x100m medley relay ===
Pos	Athlete	Time
1	(Canada) Tewksbury, Davis, Ponting, Baumann, West+, Wallingford+, Lamy+, Goss+	3:44.00
2	(England) Harper, Moorhouse, Jameson, Lee, Gillingham+	3:44.85
3	(Australia) Wilson, Stocks, Armstrong, Fasala	3:45.86
4	(New Zealand) Mosse, Forbes, Kingsman, Anderson	3:48.58
5	(Scotland) Bole, Nelson, Watson, Leishman	3:54.05
6	(Singapore) Lim, Gee Oon, Teik Oon, Siong	3:56.99
7	(Hong Kong) Hor Man Yip, Li, Watt, Yi Ming Tsang	4:00.29
8	(Wales) Perry, Williams, Rosser, Gwynne	4:07.54

+ swam in heats

Women

=== 100m freestyle ===
Pos	Athlete	Time
1	(Canada) Jane Kerr	57.62
2	(Australia) Angela Harris	57.64
3	(England) Nicola Fibbens	57.66
4	(Australia) Julie Margaret Pugh	58.10
5	(Australia) Sarah Louise Thorpe	58.17
6	(England) Annabelle Cripps	58.59
7	(Canada) Pamela Rai	58.81
8	(Canada) Patricia Noall	58.94

=== 200m freestyle ===
Pos	Athlete	Time
1	(Australia) Susie Baumer	2:00.61
2	(Canada) Jane Kerr	2:03.40
3	(Scotland) Ruth Gilfillan	2:03.88
4	(New Zealand) Fiona McLay	2:04.01
5	(England) Annabelle Cripps	2:04.19
6	(Australia) Michelle Pearson	2:04.85
7	(Canada) Patricia Noall	2:05.04
8	(England) Zara Long	2:05.23

=== 400m freestyle ===
Pos	Athlete	Time
1	(England) Sarah Hardcastle	4:07.68
2	(Australia) Susie Baumer	4:12.77
3	(Australia) Jenni Burke	4:14.22
4	(Canada) Donna McGinnis	4:16.21
5	(Scotland) Ruth Gilfillan	4:17.25
6	(England) Annabelle Cripps	4:19.05
7	(Canada) Debby Wurzburger	4:20.97
8	(Australia) Anna McVann	4:22.17

=== 800m freestyle ===
Pos	Athlete	Time
1	(England) Sarah Hardcastle	8:24.77
2	(Australia) Julie McDonald	8:29.52
3	(Australia) Jenni Burke	8:41.64
4	(England) Karen Mellor	8:44.15
5	(Canada) Debby Wurzburger	8:44.16
6	(Australia) Anna McVann	8:53.03
7	(England) Gaynor Stanley	8:54.19
8	(Canada) Kim Milne	8:57.94

=== 100m backstroke ===
Pos	Athlete	Time
1	(New Zealand) Sylvia Hume	1:04.00
2	(Australia) Georgina Parkes	1:04.07
3	(Australia) Nicole Livingstone	1:04.42
4	(England) Simone Hindmarch	1:04.62
5	(England) Kathy Read	1:04.88
6	(Australia) Audrey Moore	1:05.17
7	(New Zealand) Carmel Clark	1:05.34
8	(Scotland) Beverley Rose	1:05.63

=== 200m backstroke ===
Pos	Athlete	Time
1	(Australia) Georgina Parkes	2:14.88
2	(England) Kathy Read	2:16.92
3	(Australia) Jodi Lee McGibbon	2:17.66
4	(Australia) Audrey Moore	2:19.20
5	(New Zealand) Carmel Clark	2:19.29
6	(New Zealand) Kerrylyne Torrance	2:19.87
7	(England) Catherine White	2:19.96
8	(Canada) Pascale Choquet	2:22.02

=== 100m breaststroke ===
Pos	Athlete	Time
1	(Canada) Allison Higson	1:10.84
2	(Scotland) Jean Hill	1:11.38
3	(Australia) Dimity Douglas	1:11.98
4	(England) Suki Brownsdon	1:12.30
5	(Canada) Cindy Õunpuu	1:12.55
6	(Wales) Claire Tucker	1:13.94
7	(England) Joanne Wood	1:14.15
8	(Australia) Cindy-Lu Fitzpatrick	1:14.38

=== 200m breaststroke ===
Pos	Athlete	Time
1	(Canada) Allison Higson	2:31.20
2	(Canada) Cindy Õunpuu	2:32.63
3	(Australia) Dimity Douglas	2:34.54
4	(Scotland) Jean Hill	2:35.00
5	(England) Suki Brownsdon	2:35.98
6	(Australia) Cindy-Lu Fitzpatrick	2:36.58
7	(England) Gaynor Stanley	2:37.73
8	(England) Nina Herbert	2:39.11

=== 100m butterfly ===
Pos	Athlete	Time
1	(England) Caroline Cooper	1:02.12
2	(England) Caroline Foot	1:02.30
3	(England) Samantha Purvis	1:02.49
4	(Australia) Karen Phillips	1:03.24
5	(Australia) Angela Harris	1:03.42
6	(Australia) Celina Marie Hardy	1:03.45
7	(Canada) Pamela Rai	1:03.48
8	(Canada) Michelle MacPherson	1:03.66

=== 200m butterfly ===
Pos	Athlete	Time
1	(Canada) Donna McGinnis	2:11.97
2	(Australia) Karen Phillips	2:12.71
3	(Canada) Jill Horstead	2:14.53
4	(England) Samantha Purvis	2:14.60
5	(Australia) Celina Marie Hardy	2:14.63
6	(England) Myra O'Fee	2:16.50
7	(England) Helen Bewley	2:17.44
8	(Scotland) Lorraine Montford	2:19.63

=== 200m medley ===
Pos	Athlete	Time
1	(Australia) Suzie Landells	2:17.02
2	(Scotland) Jean Hill	2:17.21
3	(Canada) Jane Kerr	2:18.73
4	(Canada) Karin Helmstaedt	2:21.05
5	(Australia) Jodie Clatworthy	2:21.07
6	(Australia) Michelle Pearson	2:21.35
7	(Scotland) Shona Smart	2:21.71
8	(Canada) Jennifer McElroy	disq

=== 400m medley ===
Pos	Athlete	Time
1	(Australia) Suzie Landells	4:45.82
2	(Australia) Jodie Clatworthy	4:49.67
3	(England) Sarah Hardcastle	4:50.52
4	(Canada) Donna McGinnis	4:51.62
5	(Scotland) Jean Hill	4:54.11
6	(Australia) Michelle Pearson	4:55.10
7	(England) Gaynor Stanley	4:56.76
8	(England) Kathy Read	4:58.91

=== 4x100m freestyle relay ===
Pos	Athlete	Time
1	(Canada) Nugent, Kerr, Rai, Noall	3:48.45
2	(England) Cripps, Cooper, Fibbens, Long	3:49.65
3	(Australia) Harris, Grant, Pugh, Thorpe	3:50.06
4	(Scotland) E. Gilfillan, Donnelly, R. Gilfillan, Watson	3:55.89
5	(New Zealand) Clark, McLay, Torrance, Hume	4:02.43
6	(Wales) Tucker, McKinnell, Cumbers, Lewis	4:02.99
7	(Hong Kong) Hung, Ng, Chow Lai Yee, Lee	4:06.78
8	(Northern Ireland) Guiller, Madine, McKibben, Dugan	4:11.39

=== 4x200m freestyle relay ===
Pos	Athlete	Time
1	(Australia) Burke, Pearson, Thorpe, Baumer	8:12.09
2	(England) Cripps, Mellor, Hardcastle, Long	8:13.70
3	(Canada) McGinnis, Kerr, Noall, Dufour	8:20.78
4	(Scotland) E. Gilfillan, Donnelly, R. Gilfillan, Smart	8:26.58

=== 4x100m medley relay ===
Pos	Athlete	Time
1	(England) Cooper, Fibbens, Hindmarch, Brownsdon	4:13.48
2	(Canada) Higson, McBain, McGinnis, Kerr	4:14.89
3	(Australia) Harris, Douglas, Parkes, Phillips	4:15.06
4	(Scotland) Rose, Hill, Smart, Donnelly	4:17.89
5	(Wales) Tucker, Reeve, Lewis, McKinnell	4:30.70
6	(Hong Kong) Hung, Ng, Chow Lai Yee, Lee	4:36.83
7	(Northern Ireland) Guiller, Madine, McKibben, Dugan	4:40.12
