= Australian Swimming Championships =

The Australian Swimming Championships is the national Swimming championships for Australia. They are organised by Swimming Australia and separate championships are held annually in both long course (50m) and short course (25m) pools. The two meets are the country's top domestic meet for their respective course.

The meet usually also double as a selection event for international competitions such as the: Olympics, Paralympics, World Championships, Commonwealth Games and Pan Pacific Championships. Some consider the meet the second-toughest domestic competition in the world, behind the USA's national championships.

The first edition of the championships was held in Sydney in January 1896 with events at the Natatorium, Sutherland Dock (Cockatoo Island) and on the Hawkesbury River.

The state that wins the most points at the championships is awarded the Kieran Shield, named in memory of Barney B. Kieran, a swimmer from New South Wales, who was a world record holder, and who died, aged 18, in 1905.

The 1990 Australian Swimming Championships saw events for para athletes added for the first time.

== Editions ==
=== Long course ===
Year	Dates	Pool	City	State	Selection trials for
1896	15–17 January	Natatorium, Sutherland Dock (Cockatoo Island) and on the Hawkesbury River	Sydney	New South Wales	
1898	March	Lancaster Park Baths	Christchurch	New Zealand	
1900	6–13 January	Sans Souci Tidal Baths	Sydney	New South Wales	
1901	4–9 February (Note: Original due to commence on 1 February but was delayed to Death of Queen Victoria)	Hagarty's Baths, St. Kilda; Williamson Baths; Eatern Baths, Ballarat, South Melbourne	Melbourne	Victoria	
1902	25 February – 1 March	Wanganui Baths	Wanganui	New Zealand	
1930	25 January–1 February	City Baths, Footscray Baths, Brunswick Baths	Melbourne		
1930	8–15 February	Sandy Bay Baths	Hobart		
1931	10–17 January	Municipal (Domain) Baths, Drummoyne Baths, Coogee Aquarium	Sydney		
1931	21–28 January	Valley Baths, Booroodabin Baths, City Baths (Toowoomba)	Brisbane		
1932	Not held				
1933	25 January – 4 February	Claremont Baths	Perth		
1933	9–14 February	Crystal Swimming Pool	Adelaide		
1934	24–30 January	Valley Baths	Brisbane		
1934	3–10 February	Coogee Aquarium, Municipal (Domain) Baths	Sydney		
1935	19–26 January	Melbourne Olympic Pool	Melbourne		
1935	2–9 February	Sandy Bay Baths	Hobart		
1936	8–17 February	Crawley Baths	Perth	Western Australia	
1937	9–13 January	North Sydney Olympic Pool	Sydney	New South Wales	
1937	25–30 January	Valley Baths	Brisbane	Queensland	
1939	31 January–2 February	Melbourne Olympic Pool	Melbourne	Victoria	
1939	6–11 February	Sandy Bay Baths	Hobart	Tasmania	
1946	2–9 February	Richmond Baths; Brunswick Baths	Melbourne	Victoria	
1947	1–8 February	Adelaide Olympic Pool	Adelaide	South Australia	
1948	8–14 February	North Sydney Olympic Pool; Granville Olympic Pool	Sydney	New South Wales	1948 Olympic Games
1949	19–26 February	Valley Baths	Brisbane	Queensland	
1950	9–17 December (1949)	North Sydney Olympic Pool	Sydney	New South Wales	1950 Commonwealth Games
1951	17–24 February	Melbourne Olympic Pool; Brunswick Baths	Melbourne	Victoria	
1952	16–23 February	Melbourne Olympic Pool	Melbourne	Victoria	1952 Olympic Games
1953	21–28 February	North Sydney Olympic Pool; Enfield Olympic Swimming Pool	Sydney	New South Wales	
1954	20–27 February	Melbourne Olympic Pool	Melbourne	Victoria	1954 Commonwealth Games
1955	19–26 February	Adelaide Olympic Pool	Adelaide	South Australia	
1956	16–23 February	North Sydney Olympic Pool; Enfield Olympic Swimming Pool	Sydney	New South Wales	The selection trials for the 1956 Olympic Games were held in Melbourne in October.
1957	15–23 February	Canberra Olympic Pool	Canberra	Australian Capital Territory	
1958	15–22 February	Olympic Swimming Stadium	Melbourne	Victoria	1958 Commonwealth Games
1959	13–21 February	Hobart Olympic Pool	Hobart	Tasmania	
1960	23–27 February	North Sydney Olympic Pool	Sydney	New South Wales	1960 Olympic Games
1961	17–25 February	Valley Pool	Brisbane	Queensland	
1962	17–24 February	Olympic Swimming Stadium	Melbourne	Victoria	The selection trials for the 1962 Commonwealth Games were held in Melbourne in October.
1963	16–23 February	Beatty Park Aquatic Centre	Perth	Western Australia	
1964	28 February–1 March	North Sydney Olympic Pool	Sydney	New South Wales	1964 Olympic Games
1965	27 February–1 March	Hobart Olympic Pool	Hobart	Tasmania	
1966	25–27 February	Valley Pool	Brisbane	Queensland	1966 Commonwealth Games
1967	23–25 February	Adelaide Olympic Pool	Adelaide	South Australia	
1968	23–25 February	Olympic Swimming Stadium	Melbourne	Victoria	1968 Olympic Games
1969	21–23 February	Beatty Park Aquatic Centre	Perth	Western Australia	
1970	27 February–1 March	Drummoyne Olympic Pool	Sydney	New South Wales	1970 Commonwealth Games
1971	5–7 February	Hobart Olympic Pool	Hobart	Tasmania	
1972	11–13 February	Valley Pool	Brisbane	Queensland	1972 Olympic Games
1973	9–11 February	Adelaide Swimming Centre	Adelaide	South Australia	The selection trials for the 1973 FINA World Championships were held in Brisbane in August. The selection trials for the 1974 Commonwealth Games were held in Sydney in December.
1974	1–3 March	Olympic Swimming Stadium	Melbourne	Victoria	
1975	21– 23 February	Beatty Park Aquatic Centre	Perth	Western Australia	The selection trials for the 1975 FINA World Championships were held in Brisbane in June.
1976	27–29 February	North Sydney Olympic Pool	Sydney	New South Wales	1976 Olympic Games
1977	25–27 February	Clarence Memorial Olympic Pool	Hobart	Tasmania	
1978	23–26 February	Valley Pool	Brisbane	Queensland	The selection trials for the 1978 Commonwealth Games and 1978 FINA World Championships were held in Sydney in June.
1979	22–25 February	Beatty Park Aquatic Centre	Perth	Western Australia	
1980	20–23 March	Olympic Swimming Stadium	Melbourne	Victoria	1980 Olympic Games
1981	26 February–1 March	Adelaide Swimming Centre	Adelaide	South Australia	
1982	18–21 March	Warringah Aquatic Centre	Sydney	New South Wales	1982 FINA World Championships. The selection trials for the 1982 Commonwealth Games were held in Sydney in August.
1983	24–27 February	Clarence Memorial Olympic Pool	Hobart	Tasmania	
1984	23–26 February	Brisbane Aquatic Centre, Chandler	Brisbane	Queensland	1984 Olympic Games
1985	21–24 February	State Swimming Centre	Melbourne	Victoria	
1986	27 February–2 March	Adelaide Aquatic Centre	Adelaide	South Australia	1986 Commonwealth Games, 1986 FINA World Championships
1987	26 February–1 March	Beatty Park Aquatic Centre	Perth	Western Australia	The selection trials for the 1987 Pan Pacs were conducted in Brisbane from 22 to 25 July.
1988	25–28 February	Warringah Aquatic Centre	Sydney	New South Wales	The selection trials for the 1988 Olympic Games were conducted in Sydney from 11 to 14 May.
1989	23–26 February	State Swimming Centre	Melbourne	Victoria	The selection trials for the 1989 Pan Pacs were conducted in Perth in August. The selection trials for the 1990 Commonwealth Games were held in Adelaide in December.
1990	10–14 October	Brisbane Aquatic Centre	Brisbane	Queensland	1991 FINA World Championships
1991	25–29 April	State Swimming Centre	Melbourne	Victoria	1991 Pan Pacs
1992	1–5 April	Australian Institute of Sport	Canberra	Australian Capital Territory	1992 Olympic Games
1993	24–28 March	Perth Superdrome	Perth	Western Australia	1993 Pan Pacs
1994	15–20 March	Brisbane Aquatic Centre, Chandler	Brisbane	Queensland	1994 Commonwealth Games. 1994 FINA World Championships
1995	30 March –2 April	Perth Superdrome	Perth	Western Australia	1995 Pan Pacs
1996	21–27 April	Sydney International Aquatic Centre	Sydney	New South Wales	1996 Olympic Games
1997	5–11 October	Brisbane Aquatic Centre, Chandler	Brisbane	Queensland	1998 FINA World Championships. The selection trials for the 1997 Pan Pacs were held in Adelaide in March.
1998	27 April–2 May	Melbourne Sports and Aquatic Centre	Melbourne	Victoria	1998 Commonwealth Games
1999	20–27 March	Brisbane Aquatic Centre, Chandler	Brisbane	Queensland	1999 Pan Pacs
2000	13–20 May	Sydney International Aquatic Centre	Sydney	New South Wales	2000 Olympic Games
2001	24–31 March	Hobart Aquatic Centre	Hobart	Tasmania	2001 FINA World Championships
2002	18–23 March	Brisbane Aquatic Centre, Chandler	Brisbane	Queensland	2002 Commonwealth Games, 2002 Pan Pacs
2003	22–29 March	Sydney International Aquatic Centre	Sydney	New South Wales	2003 FINA World Championships
2004	27 March – 3 April	Sydney International Aquatic Centre	Sydney	New South Wales	2004 Olympic Games
2005	12–19 March	Sydney International Aquatic Centre	Sydney	New South Wales	2005 FINA World Championships
2006	30 January–4 February	Melbourne Sports and Aquatic Centre	Melbourne	Victoria	2006 Commonwealth Games, 2006 Pan Pacs
2007	3–10 December (2006)	Brisbane Aquatic Centre, Chandler	Brisbane	Queensland	2007 FINA World Championships
2008	22–29 March	Sydney International Aquatic Centre	Sydney	New South Wales	2008 Olympic Games
2009	17–22 March	Sydney International Aquatic Centre	Sydney	New South Wales	2009 FINA World Championships
2010	16–21 March	Sydney International Aquatic Centre	Sydney	New South Wales	2010 Commonwealth Games, Pan Pacs 2010
2011	1–8 April	Sydney International Aquatic Centre	Sydney	New South Wales	2011 FINA World Championships
2012	15–22 March	South Australia Aquatic and Leisure Centre	Adelaide	South Australia	2012 Olympic Games
2013	26 April–3 May	South Australia Aquatic and Leisure Centre	Adelaide	South Australia	2013 FINA World Championships
2014	1–6 April	Brisbane Aquatic Centre, Chandler	Brisbane	Queensland	2014 Commonwealth Games, Pan Pacs 2014
2015	3–10 April	Sydney International Aquatic Centre	Sydney	New South Wales	2015 FINA World Championships
2016	7–14 April	South Australia Aquatic and Leisure Centre	Adelaide	South Australia	2016 Olympic Games
2017	9–13 April	Brisbane Aquatic Centre, Chandler	Brisbane	Queensland	2017 FINA World Championships
2018	28 February–3 March	Gold Coast Aquatic Centre	Gold Coast	Queensland	2018 Commonwealth Games. The selection trials for Pan Pacs 2018 were held in Adelaide in June–July.
2019	7–12 April	South Australia Aquatic and Leisure Centre	Adelaide	South Australia	The Australian selection trials for the 2019 FINA World Championships were held in Brisbane in June.
2020	17–21 April	Perth Superdrome	Perth	Western Australia	Cancelled due to COVID-19. The selection trials for the 2020 Olympic Games in June in Adelaide were also cancelled.
2021	14–18 April	Gold Coast Aquatic Centre	Gold Coast	Queensland	The Australian swimming selection trials for the 2020 Olympic Games were held in Adelaide in June.
2022	18–22 May	South Australia Aquatic and Leisure Centre	Adelaide	South Australia	2022 FINA World Championships, 2022 Commonwealth Games
2023	17–20 April	Gold Coast Aquatic Centre	Gold Coast	Queensland	The Australian selection trials for the 2023 World Aquatics Championships were held in Melbourne from 13–18 June.
2024	17–20 April	Gold Coast Aquatic Centre	Gold Coast	Queensland	The trials for the 2024 Olympic Games were held in Brisbane from 10–15 June.
2025	21–24 April	Brisbane Aquatic Centre	Brisbane	Queensland	The Australian selection trials for the 2025 World Aquatics Championships were held in Melbourne from 9–14 June.

=== Short course ===
Year	Dates	Pool	City	State	Selection trials for
1979	August	Mowbray Pool	Launceston	Tasmania	FINA Cup, Tokyo
1980	29–31 August	University of NSW pool	Sydney	New South Wales	
1981	Not held				
1982	Not held				
1983	Not held				
1984	24–26 August	State Swimming Centre	Melbourne	Victoria	
1985	30 August – 1 September	Warringah Aquatic Centre	Sydney	New South Wales	
1986	5–7 September	Mowbray Pool	Launceston	Tasmania	
1987	25–27 September	State Swimming Centre	Melbourne	Victoria	
1988	Not held				
1989	Not held				
1990	2-4 March	Adelaide Aquatic Centre	Adelaide	South Australia	
1991	27–29 September	Adelaide Aquatic Centre	Adelaide	South Australia	
1992	25–27 September	Casuarina Pool	Darwin	Northern Territory	Oceania championships
1993			Melbourne		
1994	29 September–2 October	Warringah Aquatic Centre	Sydney		
1995	31 August – 3 September		Adelaide		SC Worlds 1995
1996	19–22 December	Melbourne Sports and Aquatic Centre	Melbourne	Victoria	
1997	17–20 July	Melbourne Sports and Aquatic Centre	Melbourne	Victoria	
1998	24–27 September	Perth Superdrome	Perth	Western Australia	
1999	2–5 September	AIS pool	Canberra	Australian Capital Territory	
2000	12–15 October	Melbourne Sports and Aquatic Centre	Melbourne		
2001	3–7 August	Perth Superdrome	Perth	Western Australia	
2002	2–5 September	Melbourne Sports and Aquatic Centre	Melbourne	Victoria	
2003	2–5 August	Hobart Aquatic Centre	Hobart	Tasmania	
2004	25–29 September	Brisbane Aquatic Centre, Chandler	Brisbane	Queensland	
2005	7–11 August	Melbourne Sports and Aquatic Centre	Melbourne	Victoria	
2006	25–28 August	Hobart Aquatic Centre	Hobart	Tasmania	
2007	29 August – 2 September	Melbourne Sports and Aquatic Centre	Melbourne	Victoria	
2008	20–24 September	Melbourne Sports and Aquatic Centre	Melbourne	Victoria	
2009	8–12 August	Hobart Aquatic Centre	Hobart	Tasmania	
2010	14–18 July	Brisbane Aquatic Centre, Chandler	Brisbane	Queensland	SC Worlds 2010
2011	1–3 July	SA Aquatic & Leisure Centre	Adelaide	South Australia	
2012	12-16 September	Perth Superdrome	Perth	Western Australia	SC Worlds 2012
2013	22–31 August	Sydney International Aquatic Centre	Sydney	New South Wales	
2014	5–9 November	SA Aquatic & Leisure Centre	Adelaide	South Australia	2014 SC Worlds
2015	26–28 November	Sydney International Aquatic Centre	Sydney	New South Wales	
2016	1–5 November	Brisbane Aquatic Centre, Chandler	Brisbane	Queensland	Short Course World Championships 2016
2017	26–28 October	South Australia Aquatic and Leisure Centre	Adelaide	South Australia	
2018	25–27 October	Melbourne Sports and Aquatic Centre	Melbourne	Victoria	Short Course World Championships 2018
2019	24–26 October	Melbourne Sports and Aquatic Centre	Melbourne	Victoria	
2020	27–29 November	various locations			Virtual Championship held in various locations replaced the originally planned Championships in Melbourne.
2021	23–26 September	Melbourne Sports and Aquatic Centre	Melbourne	Victoria	Cancelled due to COVID-19.
2022	24–27 August	Sydney Olympic Park Aquatic Centre	Sydney	New South Wales	2022 Short Course World Championships
2023	13–16 September	Sydney Olympic Park Aquatic Centre	Sydney	New South Wales	
2024	26–29 September	SA Aquatic & Leisure Centre	Adelaide	South Australia	2024 Short Course World Championships
2025	1–3 October	Melbourne Sports and Aquatic Centre	Melbourne	Victoria	
2026	29 September – 2 October	Sydney Olympic Park Aquatic Centre	Sydney	New South Wales	2026 Short Course World Championships
