= British swimming champions – 200 metres butterfly winners =

British swimming event

The British swimming champions over 200 metres butterfly, formerly the (Amateur Swimming Association (ASA) National Championships) are listed below.

The event was originally contested over 220 yards and then switched to the metric conversion of 200 metres in 1971. In 1989 there was a dead-heat in the women's final.

== 200 metres butterfly champions ==
Year	Men's champion	Women's champion
	220 yards	220 yards
1953	Brian Barnes	not contested
1954	Jack Hale	not contested
1955	Graham Symonds	not contested
1956	Derek Dickson	not contested
1957	Richard Campion	not contested
1958	Ian Black	not contested
1959	Ian Black	not contested
1960	Ian Blyth	not contested
1961	Brian Jenkins	not contested
1962	Brian Jenkins	not contested
1963	Brian Jenkins	not contested
1964	Vernon Slovin	not contested
1965	Daniel Sherry	not contested
1966	John Thurley	Ann Barner
1967	Martyn Woodroffe	Ann Barner
1968	Martyn Woodroffe	Margaret Auton
1969	Martyn Woodroffe	Vivienne Smith
1970	Martyn Woodroffe	Vivienne Smith
	200 metres	200 metres
1971	John Mills	Claire Stockley
1972	Brian Brinkley	Jean Jeavons
1973	Brian Brinkley	Jean Jeavons
1974	Brian Brinkley	Patti Stenhouse
1975	Alan McClatchey	Joanne Atkinson
1976	Philip Hubble	Ann Nelson
1977	Paul Sparkes	Sue Jenner
1978	Philip Hubble	Sue Jenner
1979		
1980	Philip Hubble	Ann Osgerby
1981	Stephen Poulter	Ann Osgerby
1982	Philip Hubble	Freda Ross
1983	Philip Hubble	Ann Osgerby
1984	David Emerson	Samantha Purvis
1985	Nick Hodgson	Samantha Purvis
1986	Nick Hodgson	Helen Bewley
1987	Neil Cochran	Helen Bewley
1988	Tim Jones	Conny van Bentum
1989	Alistair Quinn	Madeleine Scarborough & Samantha Purvis
1990	Paul Howe	Madeleine Scarborough
1991	Kevin Crosby	Helen Jepson
1992	Simon Wainwright	Helen Jepson
1993	Kevin Crosby	Marion Madine
1994	James Hickman	Helen Slatter
1995	Stephen Parry	Helen Jepson
1996	Stephen Parry	Margie Pedder
1997	Stephen Parry	Margie Pedder
1998	James Hickman	Margie Pedder
1999	James Hickman	Margie Pedder
2000	Stephen Parry	Georgina Lee
2001	Stephen Parry	Georgina Lee
2002	Stephen Parry	Georgina Lee
2003	Stephen Parry	Sarah Pyne
2004	Stephen Parry	Georgina Lee
2005	Matthew Edwards	Jessica Dickons
2006	Joseph Roebuck	Jessica Dickons
2007	Joseph Roebuck	Jemma Lowe
2008	Michael Rock	Jemma Lowe
2009	Michael Rock	Ellen Gandy
2010	Michael Rock	Ellen Gandy
2011	Michael Rock	Ellen Gandy
2012	Joseph Roebuck	Ellen Gandy
2013	Joseph Roebuck	Jemma Lowe
2014	Roberto Pavoni	Aimee Willmott
2015	Cameron Brodie	Hannah Miley
2016	Adam Mallett	Aimee Willmott
2017	James Guy	Charlotte Atkinson
2018	James Guy	Alys Thomas
2019	James Guy	Alys Thomas
2020 & 2021	not held	not held
2022	James Guy	Laura Stephens
2023	Joshua Gammon	Laura Stephens
2024	Joshua Gammon	Keanna Macinnes
2025	Duncan Scott	Keanna Macinnes
2026	Duncan Scott	Keanna Macinnes

== See also ==
- Aquatics GB
- List of British Swimming champions
