= 1985 European Junior Swimming Championships =

Water sport competitions

The 1985 European Junior Swimming Championships were held from July 25 to July 28, 1985, in Geneva, Switzerland.

== Medal table ==
Rank	Nation	Gold	Silver	Bronze	Total
1	East Germany (GDR)	14	7	9	30
2	Hungary (HUN)	6	2	2	10
3	West Germany (FRG)	3	7	5	15
4	Italy (ITA)	2	4	3	9
5	France (FRA)	2	1	1	4
6	Greece (GRE)	1	3	0	4
7	Great Britain (GBR)	1	0	3	4
8	Romania (ROU)	1	0	0	1
9	Sweden (SWE)	0	3	1	4
10	Soviet Union (URS)	0	1	3	4
11	Netherlands (NED)	0	1	1	2
12	Belgium (BEL)	0	1	0	1
13	Spain (ESP)	0	0	2	2
Totals (13 entries)		30	30	30	90

== Medal summary ==
=== Boy's events ===
Event	Gold		Silver		Bronze	
100 m freestyle	Peter Wiedmann; East Germany	52.48	Peter Sitt; West Germany	52.50	Martin Hermann; West Germany	52.59
200 m freestyle	Peter Sitt; West Germany	1:52.69	Giorgio Lamberti; Italy	1:54.49	Peter Wiedmann; East Germany	1:54.78
400 m freestyle	Walter Klaus; Hungary	4:00.42	Stefano Battistelli; Italy	4:00.88	Grant Robins; Great Britain	4:01.76
1500 m freestyle	Stefano Battistelli; Italy	15:44.70	Walter Klaus; Hungary	15:51.19	Dirk Bludau; East Germany	15:51.96
100 m backstroke	Charala Papanikolaou; Greece	58.63	Tamás Deutsch; Hungary	59.18	Steffen Gröhst; East Germany	59.27
200 m backstroke	Tamás Deutsch; Hungary	2:05.42	Charala Papanikolaou; Greece	2:05.61	Sergey Palchikov; Soviet Union	2:07.10
100 m breaststroke	Gary Watson; Great Britain	1:05.43	Enrico Müller; East Germany	1:05.92	Burkhard Schmidt; West Germany	1:07.10
200 m breaststroke	József Szabó; Hungary	2:20.58	Enrico Müller; East Germany	2:22.67	Dmitriy Porotskiy; Soviet Union	2:24.20
100 m butterfly	Ludovic Depickère; France	56.95	Andreas Maezulat; West Germany	57.43	José Luis Ballester; Spain	57.4x
200 m butterfly	József Szabó; Hungary	2:03.91	Thomas Müller; West Germany	2:05.87	José Luis Ballester; Spain	2:06.03
200 m individual medley	József Szabó; Hungary	2:06.75	Charala Papanikolaou; Greece	2:07.02	Mirko Erdman; East Germany	2:07.79
400 m individual medley	József Szabó; Hungary	4:27.71	Charala Papanikolaou; Greece	4:31.27	Mirko Erdman; East Germany	4:33.84
4 × 100 m freestyle relay	West Germany	3:29.61	Sweden	3:32.18	East Germany	3:33.32
4 × 200 m freestyle relay	West Germany	7:35.62	East Germany	7:39.33	Italy	7:43.36
4 × 100 m medley relay	East Germany	3:54.71	Soviet Union	3:55.84	West Germany	3:56.33

=== Girl's events ===
Event	Gold		Silver		Bronze	
100 m freestyle	Tamara Costache; Romania	56.69	Stephanie Bofinger; West Germany	57.66	Regina Dittman; East Germany	57.81
200 m freestyle	Regina Dittman; East Germany	2:02.27	Stephanie Bofinger; West Germany	2:05.20	Monica Olmi; Italy	2:05.35
400 m freestyle	Heide Grein; East Germany	4:16.35	Monica Olmi; Italy	4:17.82	Regina Dittman; East Germany	4:17.89
800 m freestyle	Heide Grein; East Germany	8:42.03	Isabelle Arnould; Belgium	8:50.93	Rita Kovács; Hungary	8:52.58
100 m backstroke	Silvia Krummholz; East Germany	1:04.27	Camilla Olsson; Sweden	1:04.66	Dora Varga; Hungary	1:05.02
200 m backstroke	Cornelia Seithe; East Germany	2:17.57	Camilla Olsson; Sweden	2:17.86	Silke Peppler; West Germany	2:18.04
100 m breaststroke	Pascaline Louvrier; France	1:10.74	Franziska Zietemann; East Germany	1:12.08	Åsa Hedlund; Sweden	1:13.28
200 m breaststroke	Franziska Zietemann; East Germany	1:12.08	Pascaline Louvrier; France	1:10.74	Anja Ewert; East Germany	2:36.22
100 m butterfly	Grit Sykora; East Germany	1:03.25	Annamaria Ferrera; Italy	1:04.34	Anna Rozer; Soviet Union	1:04.3x
200 m butterfly	Monica Olmi; Italy	2:16.04	Antje Wiesner; East Germany	2:16.46	Diane Velissariou; France	2:20.19
200 m individual medley	Silvia Krummholz; East Germany	2:19.87	Cornelia Seithe; East Germany	2:19.88	Zara Long; Great Britain	2:20.63
400 m individual medley	Kathrin Bühler; East Germany	4:54.74	Cornelia Seithe; East Germany	4:55.37	Zara Long; Great Britain	4:57.37
4 × 100 m freestyle relay	East Germany	3:53.15	West Germany	3:54.78	Netherlands	3:55.32
4 × 200 m freestyle relay	East Germany	8:21.49	Netherlands	8:25.36	West Germany	8:28.98
4 × 100 m medley relay	East Germany	4:18.69	West Germany	4:23.18	Italy	4:23.41
