= British swimming Champions – 100 metres butterfly winners =

British swimming event

The British swimming champions over 100 metres butterfly, formerly the (Amateur Swimming Association (ASA) National Championships) are listed below.

The event was originally contested over 110 yards and then switched to the metric conversion of 100 metres in 1971.

Canadian Daniel Sherry broke the world record for 110 yards butterfly in the 1965 final, after setting a time of 58.1 sec. In 1985 there was a dead-heat for the women's final.

== 100 metres butterfly champions ==
Year	Men's champion	Women's champion
	110 yards	110 yards
1953	not contested	Margaret Ivinson
1954	not contested	Fenella Webb
1955	not contested	Catherine Macadam
1956	not contested	Anne Morton
1957	not contested	Christine Gosden
1958	not contested	Sheila Watt
1959	not contested	Sheila Watt
1960	not contested	Sheila Watt
1961	not contested	Lesley Green
1962	not contested	Patricia Baines
1963	not contested	Mary Stewart
1964	Vernon Slovin	Mary-Anne Cotterill
1965	Daniel Sherry	Elaine Tanner
1966	John Thurley	Ann Barner
1967	Lennie Norris	Ann Barner
1968	Martyn Woodroffe	Margaret Auton
1969	Martyn Woodroffe	Margaret Auton
1970	Martyn Woodroffe	Cathy Whiting
	100 metres	100 metres
1971	Bruce Robertston	Jean Jeavons
1972	John Mills	Jean Jeavons
1973	Martin Edwards	Joanne Atkinson
1974	Brian Brinkley	Patti Stenhouse
1975	Brian Brinkley	Joanne Atkinson
1976	John Mills	Liz Taylor
1977	John Mills	Julie Hull
1978	John Mills	Sue Jenner
1979		
1980	Philip Hubble	Ann Osgerby
1981	David Lowe	Janet Osgerby
1982	Philip Hubble	Ann Osgerby
1983	Kevin Lee	Ann Osgerby
1984	David Williams	Samantha Purvis
1985	Paul Easter	Caroline Cooper & Samantha Purvis
1986	Andy Jameson	Caroline Foot
1987	Neil Cochran	Samantha Purvis
1988	Andy Jameson	Conny van Bentum
1989	David Parker	Madeleine Scarborough
1990	Nicholas Sanders	Madeleine Scarborough
1991	Mike Fibbens	Madeleine Campbell
1992	Richard Leishman	Madeleine Campbell
1993	Mike Fibbens	Marion Madine
1994	Janko Gojković	Samantha Greenep
1995	Andrew Clayton	Caroline Foot
1996	Eran Groumi	Sarah Massey
1997	Stephen Parry	Caroline Foot
1998	James Hickman	Caroline Foot
1999	James Hickman	Mandy Loots
2000	James Hickman	Margie Pedder
2001	James Hickman	Georgina Lee
2002	James Hickman	Georgina Lee
2003	Todd Cooper	Alex Savage
2004	Todd Cooper	Georgina Lee
2005	Todd Cooper	Terri Dunning
2006	Matthew Bowe	Terri Dunning
2007	Andrew Mayor	Jemma Lowe
2008	Michael Rock	Francesca Halsall
2009	Michael Rock	Ellen Gandy
2010	Michael Rock	Francesca Halsall
2011	Michael Rock	Ellen Gandy
2012	Michael Rock	Ellen Gandy
2013	Michael Rock	Jemma Lowe
2014	James Guy	Rachael Kelly
2015	Thomas Laxton	Rachael Kelly
2016	James Guy	Alys Thomas
2017	James Guy	Alys Thomas
2018	Jacob Peters	Harriet Jones
2019	James Guy	Alys Thomas
Not held during 2020 and 2021 due to the COVID-19 pandemic
2022	James Guy	Laura Stephens
2023	Jacob Peters	Keanna Macinnes
2024	Joe Litchfield	Keanna Macinnes
2025	Edward Mildred	Keanna Macinnes
2026	Edward Mildred	Keanna Macinnes

== See also ==
- Aquatics GB
- List of British Swimming champions
