= Jeff Stewart =

Jeff(rey) or Geoff(rey) Stewart may refer to:

== Sportspeople ==
- Jeffrey Stewart (curler), 2016 WFG Tankard
- Jeff Stewart (soccer) (born 1980), American soccer player
- Geoff Stewart (born 1973), rower
- Geoffrey Stewart (swimmer), English swimmer

== Others ==
- Jeffrey C. Stewart (born 1950), American historian
- Jeff Stewart (actor) (born 1955), Scottish actor
- Jeff Stewart (voice actor), American voice actor
- Jeff Stewart (music video director), American music video director
- Jeff Stewart, musician in Pearl River

== Characters ==
- Jeff Stewart, a character in The Magnetic Monster
- Jeffrey Stewart, a character in the 1958 film Party Girl

== See also ==
- Geoffrey Stewart-Smith (1933–2004), British politician
- Jeff Stuart (disambiguation)
