= Tamás Deutsch (disambiguation) =

Tamás Deutsch may refer to:

- Tamás Deutsch (swimmer)
- Tamás Deutsch (politician)
