= Caroline Cooper (swimmer) =

English swimmer

Personal information
- Nationality: English
Medal record
Swimming
Representing England
Commonwealth Games
Gold medal – first place	1986 Edinburgh	100m butterfly
Gold medal – first place	1986 Edinburgh	medley relay
Silver medal – second place	1986 Edinburgh	freestyle relay

Caroline Cooper is a female former swimmer who competed for Great Britain and England.

== Swimming career ==
Cooper represented England at the 1986 Commonwealth Games in Edinburgh, Scotland winning three medals. She won a gold medal in the 100 metres butterfly, a silver medal in the 4 x 100 metres freestyle relay and a gold medal in the 4 x 100 metres medley relay. She also represented Great Britain at the Swimming at the 1986 World Aquatics Championships.

Cooper won the 1985 ASA National Championship title in the 100 metres butterfly after dead-heating with Samantha Purvis.
