= 1986 Australian Swimming Championships =

The 1986 Australian Swimming Championships were held at the Adelaide Aquatic Centre in Adelaide, South Australia from 27 February to 2 March. They were organised by Australian Swimming.

== Medal winners ==
=== Men's events ===
Event	Gold	Silver	Bronze
50 m freestyle	Greg Fasala Nautilus (Vic)		
100 m freestyle	Greg Fasala Nautilus (Vic)		
200 m freestyle	Peter Dale Leander (Qld)		
400 m freestyle	Duncan Armstrong Lawrence (Qld)		
800 m freestyle	Michael McKenzieCarina Chandler (Qld)		
1500 m freestyle	Michael McKenzie Carina Chandler (Qld)		
50 m backstroke	David Orbell Leander (Qld)		
100 m backstroke	Thomas StachewiczBeatty Park/WAIS (WA)		
200 m backstroke	David Orbell Leander (Qld)		
50 m breaststroke	Brett Stocks Lawrence (Qld)		
100 m breaststroke	Brett Stocks Lawrence (Qld)		
200 m breaststroke	Lance Leech Leander (Qld)		
50 m butterfly	Barry ArmstrongCarine/WAIS (WA)		
100 m butterfly	Jon Sieben Lawrence (Qld)		
200 m butterfly	Jon Sieben Lawrence (Qld)		
200 m individual medley	Rob Woodhouse Melbourne Aquatics (Vic)		
400 m individual medley	Anthony McDonaldBeatty Park/WAIS (WA)		
4 × 100 m state freestyle relay	Queensland		
4 × 200 m state freestyle relay	Queensland		
4 × 100 m state medley relay	Queensland		
4 × 100 m club freestyle relay	Lawrence		
4 × 200 m club freestyle relay	Lawrence		
4 × 100 m club medley relay	Leander		

Legend: AR – Australian record; ACR – Australian All Comers record

=== Women's events ===
Event	Gold	Silver	Bronze
50 m freestyle	Angela Harris Commercial (Qld)		
100 m freestyle	Angela Harris Commercial (Qld)		
200 m freestyle	Susie Baumer Lawrence (Qld)		
400 m freestyle	Susie Baumer Lawrence (Qld)		
800 m freestyle	Jenni Burke Lawrence (Qld)		
1500 m freestyle	Julie McDonald Lawrence (Qld)		
50 m backstroke	Kim Gasch Freeway Waterlions (Vic)		
100 m backstroke	Georgina Parkes St Peters (Qld)		
200 m backstroke	Georgina Parkes St Peters (Qld)		
50 m breaststroke	Claudia Dullo Academy (NSW)		
100 m breaststroke	Cindy-Lu Fitzpatrick Leander (Qld)		
200 m breaststroke	Cindy-Lu Fitzpatrick Leander (Qld)		
50 m butterfly	Jacki Grant FAI St Bernadette's (Qld)		
100 m butterfly	Angela Harris Commercial (Qld)		
200 m butterfly	Karen Phillips Nowra (NSW)		
200 m individual medley	Michelle Pearson Burley-Griffin (NSW)		
400 m individual medley	Michelle Pearson Burley-Griffin (NSW)		
4 × 100 m state freestyle relay	Queensland		
4 × 200 m state freestyle relay	Queensland		
4 × 100 m state medley relay	Queensland		
4 × 100 m club freestyle relay	FAI St. Bernadette's Gold (Qld)		
4 × 200 m club freestyle relay	ACI Lawrence (Qld)		
4 × 100 m club medley relay	Burley Griffin		

Legend: AR – Australian record; ACR – Australian All Comers record
