= Martyn Woodroffe =

Welsh swimmer

Personal information
- Nationality: British (Welsh)
- Born: 8 September 1950 (age 75) Cardiff, Wales
- Height: 172 cm (5 ft 8 in)
- Weight: 70 kg (154 lb)

Sport
- Sport: Swimming
- Strokes: Butterfly, individual medley
- Club: Cardiff Swimming Club
Medal record
Men's swimming
Representing Great Britain
Olympic Games
Silver medal – second place	1968 Mexico City	200 m butterfly
Representing Wales
British Commonwealth Games
Silver medal – second place	1970 Edinburgh	200 m butterfly
Bronze medal – third place	1970 Edinburgh	200 m medley
Bronze medal – third place	1970 Edinburgh	4×100 m medley

Martyn John Woodroffe (born 8 September 1950) is a Welsh swimmer.

== Swimming career ==
He won a silver medal at the 1968 Olympic Games.

Woodroffe was born in Cardiff, Wales. He represented Wales at the 1966 British Empire and Commonwealth Games in Kingston, Jamaica, and 1970 British Commonwealth Games in Edinburgh, Scotland, winning one silver and two bronze medals at the latter.

In 1968 he represented Great Britain at the Olympics in Mexico City in five swimming disciplines - 100 m, 200 m butterfly, 200 m, 400 m individual medley, and in the 4×100 m medley relay. He won the silver medal in the 200 m butterfly in a time of 2 minutes 9.0 seconds, behind Carl Robie of the United States.

At the ASA National British Championships he won the 110 yards butterfly title in 1968, 1969 and 1970, the 220 yards butterfly title four times in 1967, 1968, 1969 and 1970 and the 1969 200 metres freestyle title. He also won the 220 yards medley title in 1968, 1969 and 1970 and the 440 yards medley title in 1968, 1969 and 1970.

== Honours ==
Woodroffe was awarded the BBC Wales Sports Personality of the Year in 1968, and was admitted into the Welsh Sports Hall of Fame in 2001.

== See also ==
- List of Commonwealth Games medallists in swimming (men)
- List of Olympic medalists in swimming (men)
