= Helen Don-Duncan =

English swimmer (1981–2023)

Personal information
- National team: Great Britain
- Born: 9 June 1981 Wigan, England
- Died: 12 August 2023 (aged 42)
- Height: 1.65 m (5 ft 5 in)
- Weight: 56 kg (123 lb; 8.8 st)
- Spouse: Craig Smart

Sport
- Sport: Swimming
Medal record
Women's swimming
Representing Great Britain
World Championships (SC)
| Silver medal – second place | 1999 Hong Kong | 200 m backstroke |
European Championships (SC)
| Silver medal – second place | 1998 Sheffield | 200 m backstroke |
Representing England
Commonwealth Games
| Bronze medal – third place | 1998 Kuala Lumpur | 200 m backstroke |

Helen Smart (nee Don-Duncan; 9 June 1981 – 12 August 2023) was an English competitive swimmer and backstroke specialist.

== Swimming career ==
Don-Duncan represented Great Britain in the Olympics, FINA world championships, and European championships, and swam for England in the Commonwealth Games. At the 2000 Olympic Games in Sydney, Australia, she came 15th in the women's 200-metre backstroke.

Don-Duncan represented England and won a bronze medal in the 200 backstroke metres event, at the 1998 Commonwealth Games in Kuala Lumpur, Malaysia.

At the ASA National British Championships, she won four consecutive 200 metres backstroke titles (in 1997, 1998, 1999 and 2000).

== Post-swimming career ==
After retiring from competitive swimming following the Sydney Olympics, Don-Duncan moved into education, becoming the headteacher of Worsley Mesnes Community Primary School in Wigan, a position she held for the rest of her life.

== Personal life ==
Don-Duncan was married and had two children.

== Death ==
Don-Duncan died on 12 August 2023, at the age of 42. The family had been on holiday in the Lake District.
