= Gary Binfield =

British swimmer (1966–2008)

Personal information
- Born: 13 March 1966 Milton Keynes, England
- Died: 14 March 2008 (aged 42) Buford, Georgia, United States

Sport
- Sport: Swimming
Medal record
Swimming
Representing England
Commonwealth Games
Silver medal – second place	1986 Edinburgh	medley relay

Gary Binfield (13 March 1966 – 14 March 2008) was a British swimmer.

== Swimming career ==
Binfield competed in two events at the 1988 Summer Olympics. He represented England in the backstroke and individual medley events, at the 1986 Commonwealth Games in Edinburgh, Scotland. Four years later he once again represented England in the backstroke and medley events and won a silver medal in the 4 x 100 metres medley relay, at the 1990 Commonwealth Games in Auckland, New Zealand. He also won the 1987 and 1989 ASA National Championship title in the 100 metres backstroke the 1986, 1988 and 1989 champion in 200 metres backstroke, was the 1987 champion in 200 metres medley and the 1984 champion in the 400 metres medley.
