= British swimming champions – 200 metres backstroke winners =

British swimming event

The British swimming champions over 200 metres backstroke, formerly the (Amateur Swimming Association (ASA) National Championships) are listed below. The event was originally contested over 220 yards and then switched to the metric conversion of 200 metres in 1971.

Kathy Read (married name Osher) has won a record number of senior National titles (29), which includes eleven 200 metres backstroke titles.

== 200 metres backstroke champions ==
Year	Men's champion	Women's champion
	220 yards	220 yards
1961	Graham Sykes	not contested
1962	Graham Sykes	not contested
1963	Roddy Jones	not contested
1964	Brian Stewart	Linda Ludgrove
1965	Ralph Hutton	Ann Fairlie
1966	Neil Jackson	Linda Ludgrove
1967	Peter Reynolds	Linda Ludgrove
1968	David Butler	Wendy Burrell
1969	Clive Rushton	Donna Gurr
1970	Mike Richards	Wendy Burrell
	200 metres	200 metres
1971	Mike Richards	Jackie Brown
1972	Colin Cunningham	Diana Ashton
1973	Colin Cunningham	Gillian Fordyce
1974	Steve Pickell	Wendy Cook
1975	Peter Lerpiniere	Michelle Crook
1976	Jim Carter	Sharron Davies
1977	Jim Carter	Sharron Davies
1978	Gary Abraham	Sharron Davies
1979	Douglas Campbell	Jane Admans
1980	Douglas Campbell	Jane Admans
1981	Douglas Campbell	Jolanda de Rover
1982	Andy Jameson	Cathy White
1983	John Davey	Cathy White
1984	John Davey	Kathy Read
1985	Mark Matthews	Kathy Read
1986	Gary Binfield	Kathy Read
1987	John Davey	Kathy Read
1988	Gary Binfield	Jolanda de Rover
1989	Gary Binfield	Kathy Read
1990	Tamás Deutsch	Anna Simcic
1991	Grant Robins	Kathy Read
1992	Grant Robins	Kathy Read
1993	Adam Ruckwood	Kathy Osher
1994	Adam Ruckwood	Kathy Osher
1995	Adam Ruckwood	Kathy Osher
1996	Simon Militis	Kathy Osher
1997	Adam Ruckwood	Helen Don-Duncan
1998	Adam Ruckwood	Helen Don-Duncan
1999	Adam Ruckwood	Helen Don-Duncan
2000	Adam Ruckwood	Helen Don-Duncan
2001	Simon Militis	Joanna Fargus
2002	Gregor Tait	Sarah Price
2003	James Goddard	Katy Sexton
2004	Gregor Tait	Katy Sexton
2005	Gregor Tait	Melanie Marshall
2006	James Goddard	Lizzie Simmonds
2007	Marco Loughran	Sophie Casson
2008	Gregor Tait	Lizzie Simmonds
2009	Chris Walker-Hebborn	Lizzie Simmonds
2010	James Goddard	Lizzie Simmonds
2011	James Goddard	Stephanie Proud
2012	Calum Jarvis	Lizzie Simmonds
2013	Craig McNally	Lizzie Simmonds
2014	Charlie Boldison	Lauren Quigley
2015	Craig McNally	Lizzie Simmonds
2016	Luke Greenbank	Lizzie Simmonds
2017	Luke Greenbank	Rosie Rudin
2018	Christian Diener	Lizzie Simmonds
2019	Luke Greenbank	Jessica Fullalove
Not held during 2020 and 2021 due to the COVID-19 pandemic
2022	Luke Greenbank	Katie Shanahan
2023	Oliver Morgan	Katie Shanahan
2024	Oliver Morgan	Honey Osrin
2025	Oliver Morgan	Katie Shanahan
2026	Oliver Morgan	Katie Shanahan

== See also ==
- Aquatics GB
- List of British Swimming champions
