= British swimming champions – 400 metres medley winners =

British swimming event

The British swimming champions over 400 metres individual medley, formerly the (Amateur Swimming Association (ASA) National Championships) are listed below.

The event was originally contested over 440 yards and then switched to the metric conversion of 400 metres in 1971. In 1968 there was a dead-heat in the men's final.

== 400 metres individual medley champions ==
| Year | Men's champion | Women's champion |
|---|---|---|
| | 440 yards | 440 yards |
| 1963 | Brian Jenkins | Anita Lonsbrough |
| 1964 | Tudor Lacey | Anita Lonsbrough |
| 1965 | Sandy Gilchrist | Barbara Hounsell |
| 1966 | Alan Kimber | Susan Williams |
| 1967 | Alan Kimber | Shelagh Ratcliffe |
| 1968 | Martyn Woodroffe & Alan Kimber | Shelagh Ratcliffe |
| 1969 | Martyn Woodroffe | Shelagh Ratcliffe |
| 1970 | Martyn Woodroffe | Shelagh Ratcliffe |
| | 400 metres | 400 metres |
| 1971 | Steve Roxborough | Denise Banks |
| 1972 | Raymond Terrell | Diane Walker |
| 1973 | Brian Brinkley | Diane Walker |
| 1974 | Jim Carter | Leslie Cliff |
| 1975 | Alan McClatchey | Anne Adams |
| 1976 | Alan McClatchey | Sharron Davies |
| 1977 | Alan McClatchey | Sharron Davies |
| 1978 | Simon Gray | Sharron Davies |
| 1979 | | Sharron Davies |
| 1980 | Simon Gray | Sharron Davies |
| 1981 | Stephen Poulter | Maria Scott |
| 1982 | Stephen Poulter | Louise Tate |
| 1983 | John Davey | Sarah Hardcastle |
| 1984 | Gary Binfield | Kathy Read |
| 1985 | | Kathy Read |
| 1986 | John Davey | Sarah Hardcastle |
| 1987 | John Davey | Gaynor Stanley |
| 1988 | John Davey | Tracey Atkin |
| 1989 | Paul Brew | Suki Brownsdon |
| 1990 | John Munro | Zara Long |
| 1991 | Andy Rolley | Zara Long |
| 1992 | Grant Robins | Helen Slatter |
| 1993 | Grant Robins | Marie Hardiman |
| 1994 | David Warren | Helen Slatter |
| 1995 | James Hickman | Katie Goddard |
| 1996 | Michael Halika | Jodie Swallow |
| 1997 | Tatsuya Kinugasa | Nicole Hetzer |
| 1998 | James Hickman | Samantha Nesbit |
| 1999 | Michael Halika | Mandy Loots |
| 2000 | Simon Militis | Rachel Corner |
| 2001 | Simon Militis | Holly Fox |
| 2002 | Robin Francis | Holly Fox |
| 2003 | Robin Francis | Rebecca Shaw |
| 2004 | Adrian Turner | Rebecca Cooke |
| 2005 | Euan Dale | Rebecca Cooke |
| 2006 | Joseph Roebuck | Hannah Miley |
| 2007 | Joseph Roebuck | Hannah Miley |
| 2008 | Thomas Haffield | Hannah Miley |
| 2009 | Thomas Haffield | Hannah Miley |
| 2010 | Roberto Pavoni | Hannah Miley |
| 2011 | Roberto Pavoni | Hannah Miley |
| 2012 | Roberto Pavoni | Hannah Miley |
| 2013 | Roberto Pavoni | Hannah Miley |
| 2014 | Roberto Pavoni | Aimee Willmott |
| 2015 | Dan Wallace | Hannah Miley |
| 2016 | Max Litchfield | Hannah Miley |
| 2017 | Max Litchfield | Hannah Miley |
| 2018 | Tom Dean | Mireia Belmonte |
| 2019 | Max Litchfield | Aimee Willmott |
Not held during 2020 and 2021 due to the COVID-19 pandemic
| 2022 | Duncan Scott | Freya Colbert |
| 2023 | Charlie Hutchison | Freya Colbert |
| 2024 | Max Litchfield | Freya Colbert |
| 2025 | Max Litchfield | Abbie Wood |
| 2026 | Max Litchfield | Amalie Smith |

== See also ==
- Aquatics GB
- List of British Swimming champions
