= Louise Tate =

English competitive swimmer (born 1965)

Personal information
- Nationality: English
- Born: 1965 (age 59–60) Leeds

Louise Tate (born 1965), is a female former swimmer who competed for England.

== Swimming career ==
Tate became National champion in 1982 when she won the 1982 ASA National British Championships title in the 400 metres medley.

Tate represented England in the 200 and 400 metres individual medley, at the 1982 Commonwealth Games in Brisbane, Queensland, Australia.
