= Sharron Davies =

British swimmer

The Right Honourable The Baroness Davies of Devonport MBE
- Official portrait, 2026

Personal information
- Full name: Sharron Elizabeth Davies
- National team: Great Britain
- Born: 1 November 1962 (age 64) Plymouth, Devon, England
- Height: 5 ft 11 in (180 cm)
- Weight: 10 st 6 lb (66 kg)
- Website: sharrondavies.com

Member of the House of Lords
- Lord Temporal
- Life peerage 15 January 2026

Personal details
- Party: Conservative

Sport
- Sport: Swimming
- Strokes: Freestyle, individual medley
- Club: Portsmouth Northsea Swimming Club
Medal record
Women's swimming
Representing Great Britain
Olympic Games
Silver medal – second place	1980 Moscow	400 m medley
European Championships (LC)
Bronze medal – third place	1977 Jönköping	400 m medley
Bronze medal – third place	1977 Jönköping	4×100 m freestyle
Representing England
Commonwealth Games
Gold medal – first place	1978 Edmonton	200 m medley
Gold medal – first place	1978 Edmonton	400 m medley
Silver medal – second place	1978 Edmonton	4×100 m freestyle
Silver medal – second place	1990 Auckland	4×200 m freestyle
Bronze medal – third place	1978 Edmonton	4×100 m medley
Bronze medal – third place	1990 Auckland	4×100 m freestyle

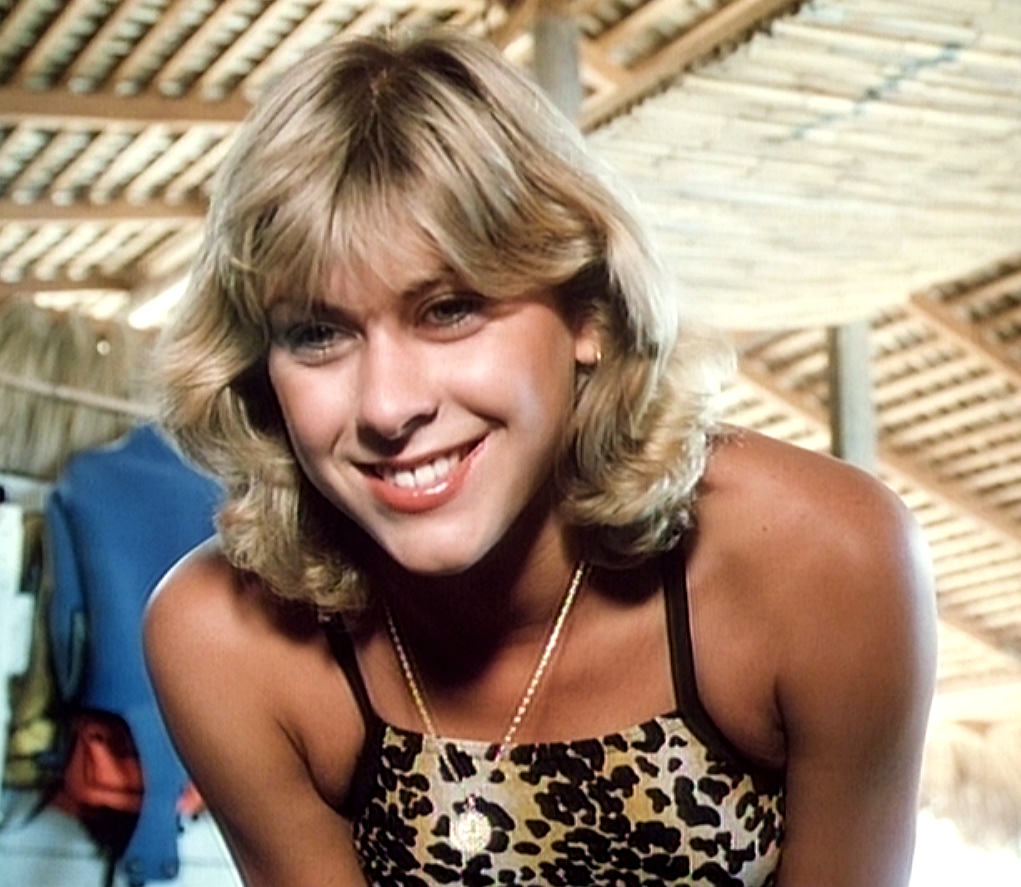
Sharron Davies in the 1983 series The Optimist

Sharron Elizabeth Davies, Baroness Davies of Devonport (born 1 November 1962) is an English former swimmer who represented Great Britain in the Olympics and European championships and competed for England in the Commonwealth Games. She won a silver medal in the 400 m individual medley in the 1980 Olympics. In all Davies has attended 12 consecutive Olympics, including working for BBC Sport.

She competed in three Olympic Games over three decades, 1970s, 1980s and 1990s. She also competed internationally in a period spanning over 20 years.

Since retiring from the sport, Davies has worked for various media organisations and programmes. In 2005, Davies supported the British Olympic bid by profile-raising and appearing as spokesperson on BBC's Question Time, where she made a strong case for bringing the games to London for 2012. Davies is a current patron of the Disabled Sport England and SportsAid. She was also the face of the Swim for Life charity event which raised total over £10m for many charities. She has vocally campaigned against transgender rights, both in sports and more broadly; and her work regarding such along with her prior sporting achievements led her to receive a life peerage from the Conservative Party on 15 January 2026.

== Early life ==
Davies was born in Plymouth, Devon, and grew up in Plymouth and Plymstock. She has twin brothers. She attended Plymstock Comprehensive School and the private school Kelly College, which is now known as Mount Kelly, in Tavistock.

She originally learnt to swim with Devonport Royal Swimming Association. At the age of eight she moved to Port of Plymouth Swimming Association, where she was coached by Ray Bickley and then by her father, Terry Davies. Her father was added in 2021 to the British Swimming Coaches Association Hall of Fame.

== Swimming ==
She set a record by swimming for the British national team at the age of 11. In 1976, at age 13, Davies was selected to represent Great Britain at the 1976 Summer Olympics in Montreal. The next year she won two bronze medals in the 1977 European Aquatics Championships. The following year, at age 15, she won gold medals at the 1978 Commonwealth Games in the 200 and 400-metre individual medleys and also a silver and a bronze medal.

In the 1980 Olympics, Davies took the silver medal in the 400 m individual medley behind Petra Schneider from East Germany, who later admitted that the victory was drug enhanced.

Davies initially retired at age 18, later citing her father's "very tough" coaching style as a factor. In 1989, and training at Bracknell & Wokingham Swimming Club, she returned to the pool, where she picked up two more medals at the 1990 Commonwealth Games.

== Medals and awards ==
Davies has broken or re broken many British records whilst competing and winning For medals table, see Medal record.

- silver medal in the 400-metre individual medley at the 1980 Olympics in Moscow
- two gold, two silver and two bronze medals at the Commonwealth Games in 1978 and 1990.
- two bronze medals at European Championships

Davies held the Commonwealth Record for 400-metre individual medley for 18 years. She has broken five World Masters records.

In the latest development in the story of the East German state-run doping programme, The Times broke the news in 2021 of a possibility that the bronze and silver medals won may be upgraded to gold.

At the ASA National British Championships she won 22 titles – the 100 metres freestyle title in 1978, 200 metres freestyle title in 1977 and 1978, 400 metres freestyle title in 1977, 1978 and 1979, 800 metres freestyle title in 1978, 200 metres backstroke title in 1976, 1977 and 1978, 200 metres medley title in 1976, 1977, 1978, 1980, 1989 and 1992, 400 metres medley title in 1976, 1977, 1978, 1979 and 1980 and the 50 metres butterfly title in 1992.

In the 1993 New Year Honours, Davies was appointed Member of the Order of the British Empire "for services to swimming".

== Politics and activism ==
Davies endorsed Conservative Party politician Kemi Badenoch in the July–September 2022 Conservative Party leadership election.

In 2025, after commenting on the repeal of the Vagrancy Act, saying that decriminalising rough sleeping was a "huge mistake", Davies was suspended as patron of Shekinah, a Devon based homelessness charity.

In 2026, Davies spoke out in favour of revoking access to abortion medication by mail, saying that abortion pills could "too easily fall into the hands of abusers".

=== Transgender rights ===
Davies is known for her criticism of transgender rights, and has been associated with the gender-critical movement. She has expressed concerns about the impact of gender self-identification on women's sport and spaces, arguing that it may disadvantage cisgender women. These views have generated significant debate and controversy.

In 2019, Davies made comments about participation by trans women in women's sport, opposing such participation and saying that trans women hold a biological advantage in sports. She became involved in the question of trans women in sport because at the 1980 Olympics she lost out on gold to Petra Schneider who, along with other East German athletes, had been put on testosterone to enhance their performances through doping.

In a tweet posted on 21 December 2019, Davies expressed her disapproval of drag shows, comparing them to blackface. The statement drew criticism with some commentators finding her comparison to blackface inappropriate and disrespectful of the fight against racism. In response to the criticism, Davies clarified that her comment was not intended to be understood as racist. In April 2025, shortly after the death of transgender female drag performer and activist Bianca Castro-Arabejo (Jiggly Caliente), Davies responded to a BBC News obituary for Castro-Arabejo by posting, "When will this stop? Endless drag stories. I'd love to know who's responsible?", which attracted criticism from other X users including actress Faye Wheeler, who replied, "You are a heartless person."

In 2022, Davies said that trans women competing at the elite level stand to gain a performance advantage of 10–20% over cisgender women, with the degree of advantage depending on sport and age of medical transition (if any), and called for women's sport to exclude XY chromosome athletes. In March, she wrote a column for The Times arguing that trans women's advantage is the result of going through male puberty, resulting in a narrower angle between the hips and knees which testosterone reduction does not eliminate, and called for trans women to compete in an open category rather than being excluded from competition entirely. In the same article, she stated: "This month we saw an athlete, Lia Thomas, who was an average club swimmer as a man claim an NCAA title as the US No 1 woman with 20 years of male development in the tank."

In her 2023 book, Unfair Play: The Battle for Women's Sport, Davies argues against the inclusion of trans women in women's sport. Davies compares trans women competing in women's sport to the drug-enhanced performances of GDR women that competed against her and other women, like Ann Osgerby. In September 2023, Davies was reported to be leading a campaign aiming to question Members of Parliament (MPs) on camera about their understanding of the term "woman" and publishing their responses online.

In April 2023, Davies criticised the sportswear brand Nike and called for a boycott of the company after Dylan Mulvaney, a trans woman, promoted a Nike sports bra on social media.

In November 2025, Davies on Good Morning Britain announced that she and sailor Tracy Edwards had formed a "women's sports union" designed to ensure the separation of transgender athletes from female sports at the recreational and junior levels, citing what she characterised as a failure of sports to act upon the UK Supreme Court ruling in For Women Scotland Ltd v The Scottish Ministers.

=== Peerage ===
In 2025, Kemi Badenoch, leader of the Conservative Party, said that she had nominated Davies for a peerage "in recognition of her sporting achievements and her campaigning on women's rights"; she was nominated in December 2025 as part of the 2025 Political Peerages and was created as Baroness Davies of Devonport, of Bradford-on-Avon in the County of Wiltshire on 15 January 2026.

== Publications, media programmes and other work ==
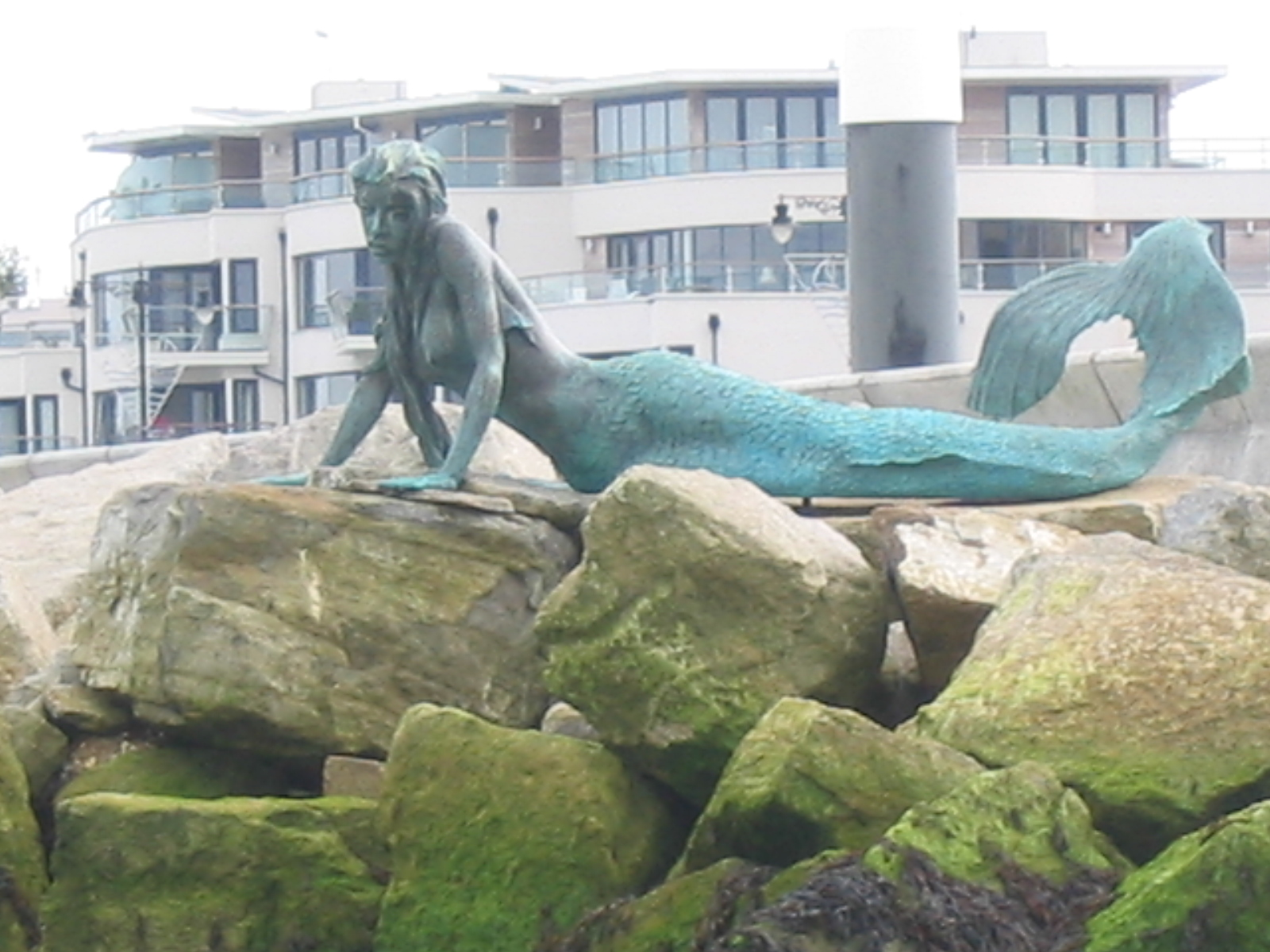
Bronze statue of a mermaid, modelled by Davies, on the sea wall of the Royal Yacht Squadron, Cowes, Isle of Wight

=== Books ===
- Against the Tide. HarperCollins. 1984. ISBN 978-0002181204.
- Learn to Swim in a Weekend. Dorling Kindersley. 1992. ISBN 978-0679412762.
- Pregnant and Fit. Partridge. 1995. ISBN 9781852252403. with Julia Thorley
- British Girls of Sport 1994 calendar, raising money for the Sports Aid Foundation

=== Television ===
- 1983: Channel 4 television comedy series The Optimist
- This Morning – presenting a mums and babies learning to swim series on ITV
- 1981: Presenter of Ace Reports (ITV's version of Blue Peter)
- 1985: Guest dart player, throwing for charity, on ITV's Bullseye
- 1995: Joined ITV's Gladiators as "Amazon"
- 1996: Presented Channel 4's The Big Breakfast
- 1996, 2000: Presenting and commentating on the Olympics for the BBC
- 2005: Question Time discussing the winning Olympic bid for London 2012
- 2008: Presented with Jim Rosenthal on Five's Superstars
- 2010: Appeared on ITV's Dancing on Ice, partnered by regular participant Pavel Aubrecht; eliminated on 21 February 2010 (week 7 of the series)
- Ski tuition video with world champion Franz Klammer, alongside fellow swimmer Duncan Goodhew
- 2012: Presenter at London's 2012 Olympics Handover Party at the Mall
- 2017: Appeared on Channel 4's The Island with Bear Grylls

=== Online ===
- In January 2022, she launched an online fitness site, Sharron Davies Training.
- In her 2023 book, Unfair Play: The Battle for Women's Sport, Davies discusses trans women in women's sport.

== Personal life ==
In the 1980s, Davies lived with and was engaged to Neil Adams an Olympic and World Championship medallist in judo.

Davies then married gym manager John Crisp in West Sussex in 1987. They were divorced in 1991.

In 1992, she met athlete Derek Redmond at the Barcelona Olympics. In 1994 they were married in Northampton, and had two children. They divorced in 2000.

Davies's third marriage was to British Airways pilot Tony Kingston. They were married in 2002 in Gloucestershire. In autumn 2006, she announced that she was three months pregnant after 8 rounds of IVF treatment, having been trying for a baby for four years and suffering two miscarriages. During a Sport Relief event in Devon, she said: "We're very optimistic and happy but we're cautious, too, because of what we have been through. Giving birth at 44 doesn't worry me. So many women go through this as they leave it later to have babies." Davies gave birth to her third child on 30 January 2007. She separated from Kingston in 2009 after seven years of marriage.

== See also ==
- List of Olympic medalists in swimming (women)
- List of Commonwealth Games medallists in swimming (women)
