= Philip Hubble =

British swimmer (born 1960)

Personal information
- Full name: Philip C. Hubble
- Nickname: "Phil"
- National team: Great Britain
- Born: 19 July 1960 (age 65) Beaconsfield, England
- Height: 1.85 m (6 ft 1 in)
- Weight: 79 kg (174 lb; 12.4 st)

Sport
- Sport: Swimming
- Strokes: Butterfly
- Club: Hounslow
Medal record
Men's swimming
Representing Great Britain
Olympic Games
Silver medal – second place	1980 Moscow	200 m butterfly
European Championships (LC)
Silver medal – second place	1981 Split	200 m butterfly
Summer Universiade
Silver medal – second place	1983 Edmonton	200 m butterfly
Representing England
Commonwealth Games
Gold medal – first place	1982 Brisbane	200 m butterfly
Silver medal – second place	1982 Brisbane	100 m butterfly
Silver medal – second place	1982 Brisbane	4×100 m freestyle
Silver medal – second place	1982 Brisbane	4×100 m medley
Silver medal – second place	1982 Brisbane	4×200 m freestyle
Bronze medal – third place	1978 Edmonton	200 m butterfly
Bronze medal – third place	1978 Edmonton	4×200 m freestyle

Philip C Hubble (born 19 July 1960) is an English former butterfly swimmer.

== Swimming career ==
=== Olympic Games ===
Hubble represented Great Britain and competed in events at the 1980 and 1984 Olympic Games, winning the silver medal in 1980 in the men's 200-metre butterfly.

=== Commonwealth Games ===
He won seven medals at the Commonwealth Games. In 1978 he represented England and won two bronze medals in the 100 metres butterfly and 4 x 200 metres freestyle relay, at the 1978 Commonwealth Games in Edmonton, Alberta, Canada. Four years later he won five more medals when representing England at the 1982 Commonwealth Games in Brisbane, Queensland, Australia, the medals consisted of a gold medal in the 200 metres butterfly, and four silver medals in the 100 metres butterfly, the 4 x 100 metres freestyle relay, the 4 x 200 metres freestyle relay and the 4 x 100 metres medley relay.

=== National Championships ===
He is a two times winner of the ASA National Championship 200 metres freestyle title (1980 and 1983), two times winner of the 100 metres butterfly title (1980 and 1982) and a five times winner of the 200 metres butterfly (1976, 1978, 1980, 1982 and 1983).

== See also ==
- List of Commonwealth Games medallists in swimming (men)
- List of Olympic medalists in swimming (men)
