= Kathy Read =

British swimmer (born 1969)

Personal information
- Born: 30 June 1969 (age 57) Great Yarmouth, England
- Height: 1.77 m (5 ft 9 1/2 in)
- Weight: 60 kg (130 lb)

Sport
- Sport: Swimming
- Club: Barnet Copthall, Norwich Penguins
Medal record
Women's swimming
Representing Great Britain
European Championships
Bronze medal – third place	1993 Sheffield	4×100 m medley
Representing England
Commonwealth Games
Silver medal – second place	1986 Edinburgh	200 m backstroke
Silver medal – second place	1994 Victoria	4x100 m medley
Bronze medal – third place	1994 Victoria	100 m backstroke

Katherine Read (born 30 June 1969), also known by her married name Katherine Osher, is an English former backstroke swimmer who competed at three Olympic Games, in Los Angeles 1984, Seoul 1988 and Barcelona 1992. She holds the record of 42 National titles

== Career ==
=== Olympic Games ===
Read competed at her first Olympic Games in Los Angeles 1984 at the age of 15 and reached the B final of the 200 m backstroke, finishing 11th overall. Two years later at the 1986 Commonwealth Games in Edinburgh, Scotland, she won a silver medal in the 200 m backstroke. At her second Olympic Games in Seoul 1988, Read reached the B finals of both the 100 m and 200m backstroke, overall she finished 16th and 12th respectively. At her final Olympics in Barcelona 1992, she was eliminated in the heats, finishing 24th overall in the 100 m and 21st in the 200m backstroke events. She competed at the 1996 Olympic trials, but failed to make the team for Atlanta.

=== European Championships ===
During her career, Read also reached six individual finals at the European Championships, 8th at 200 m (1987), 7th at both 100 m & 200 m (1989), 6th at 200 m (1991) and 6th at both 100 & 200 m (1993). It was at the 1993 European Championships event in Sheffield that she finally won a European Championship medal, winning bronze in the medley relay along with teammates Jaime King, Nicola Kennedy and Karen Pickering.

=== Commonwealth Games ===
She represented England and won a silver medal in the 200 metres backstroke, at the 1986 Commonwealth Games in Edinburgh, Scotland. Four years later she represented England in the 100 metres and 200 metres backstroke events, at the 1990 Commonwealth Games in Auckland, New Zealand. At the 1994 Commonwealth Games in Victoria (as Kathy Osher), she won two medals, bronze in the 100 m backstroke, followed by a silver in the medley relay.

=== National Championships ===
Her record of 42 ASA National Championship titles includes 29 senior titles (26 backstroke titles (5 x 50 metres backstroke), (10 x 100 metres backstroke), (11 x 200 metres backstroke) and (3 medley titles (1 x 200 metres medley), (2 x 400 metres medley).

== International competitions ==
Year	Competition	Venue	Position	Event	Notes
1984	Olympic Games	Los Angeles, United States	11th	200 m backstroke	2:18.33
1986	Commonwealth Games	Edinburgh, Scotland	5th	100 m backstroke	1:04.88
1986	Commonwealth Games	Edinburgh, Scotland	2nd	200 m backstroke	2:16.92
1986	Commonwealth Games	Edinburgh, Scotland	8th	400 m Ind. medley	4:58.91
1986	World Championships	Madrid, Spain	13th	100 m backstroke	1:04.52
1986	World Championships	Madrid, Spain	13th	200 m backstroke	2:18.13
1986	World Championships	Madrid, Spain	10th	4 × 100 m medley	4:19.37
1987	European Championships	Strasbourg, France	8th	200 m backstroke	2:16.46
1988	Olympic Games	Seoul, South Korea	16th	100 m backstroke	1:04.27
1988	Olympic Games	Seoul, South Korea	12th	200 m backstroke	2:18.20
1988	Olympic Games	Seoul, South Korea	9th	4 × 100 m medley	4:16.18
1989	European Championships	Bonn, Germany	7th	100 m backstroke	1:04.60
1989	European Championships	Bonn, Germany	7th	200 m backstroke	2:16.85
1989	European Championships	Bonn, Germany	5th	4 × 100 m medley	4:13.89
1990	Commonwealth Games	Auckland, New Zealand	6th	100 m backstroke	1:04.59
1990	Commonwealth Games	Auckland, New Zealand	5th	200 m backstroke	2:15.75
1991	European Championships	Athens, Greece	6th	200 m backstroke	2:15.15
1992	Olympic Games	Barcelona, Spain	24th	100 m backstroke	1:04.97
1992	Olympic Games	Barcelona, Spain	21st	200 m backstroke	2:17.15
1993	European Championships	Sheffield, England	6th	100 m backstroke	1:03.54
1993	European Championships	Sheffield, England	6th	200 m backstroke	2:14.55
1993	European Championships	Sheffield, England	3rd	4 × 100 m medley	4:12.18
1994	Commonwealth Games	Victoria, Canada	3rd	100 m backstroke	1:03.27
1994	Commonwealth Games	Victoria, Canada	6th	200 m backstroke	2:16.25
1994	Commonwealth Games	Victoria, Canada	2nd	4 × 100 m medley	4:12.83
