= Patricia Baines =

English swimmer

Personal information
- Nationality: British (English)
- Born: 4 April 1944 (age 81) Ilford, England

Sport
- Sport: Swimming
- Event: Butterfly
- Club: Stoke Newington SC

Patricia S E Baines (born 1944), is a female former swimmer who competed for England.

== Biography ==
Baines represented the England team at the 1962 British Empire and Commonwealth Games in Perth, Western Australia. She competed in the 110 yards butterfly event.

Swimming for the Stoke Newington Swimming Club at the ASA National British Championships she became the 110 yards butterfly in 1962 at Blackpool.
