= Jane Admans =

British swimmer

Personal information
- Born: 21 June 1959 (age 67) Eton, Berkshire, England

Sport
- Sport: Swimming

Jane Admans (born 21 June 1959) is a female retired British swimmer. Admans competed in the women's 200 metre backstroke at the 1980 Summer Olympics. At the ASA National British Championships she won the 200 metres backstroke title twice (1979 and 1980).
