= Jeff Stuart =

Jeff Stuart may refer to:

- Jeff Stuart (screenwriter) of The Trance (The Twilight Zone)
- Jeff Stuart, character in Racing Luck (1948 film)

== See also ==
- Jeff Stewart (disambiguation)
