= Joanne Atkinson =

English swimmer (born 1959)

Personal information
- Full name: Joanne Louise Atkinson
- National team: United Kingdom
- Born: 4 March 1959 (age 67) Chipping Campden, England
- Height: 1.65 m (5 ft 5 in)
- Weight: 62 kg (137 lb; 9.8 st)

Sport
- Sport: Swimming
- Strokes: Butterfly
- College team: University of Miami

Joanne Louise Atkinson (born 4 March 1959), also known by her married name Joanne Palmer, is an English former competitive swimmer.

== Swimming career ==
Atkinson represented Great Britain at the 1976 Summer Olympics in Montreal, Quebec, where she competed in the preliminary heats of the women's 100- and 200-metre butterfly events.

Atkinson was born in Chipping Campden, Gloucestershire, England, and she attended Millfield School in Somerset. At Millfield, Atkinson was trained by swimming coach Paddy Garratt.

As a 15-year-old, she represented England at the 1974 British Commonwealth Games in Christchurch, New Zealand, where she reached the finals of the women's 100-metre butterfly and 4×100-metre medley relay events. At the ASA National British Championships she won the 100 metres butterfly title in 1973 and 1975 and the 200 metres butterfly title in 1975.

After Millfield, Atkinson attended the University of Miami in Miami, Florida, where she competed for the Miami Hurricanes swimming and diving team in 1977 and 1978, and received All-American honours both years. She later completed a PGCE at Durham University.

== See also ==
- Great Britain at the 1976 Summer Olympics
