= Brian Barnes (swimmer) =

British swimmer (1934–2024)

Personal information
- Full name: Brian Joseph Barnes
- Born: 2 March 1934 Preston, Lancashire, England
- Died: 10 April 2024 (aged 90)

Sport
- Sport: Swimming
- Club: Preston Swimming Club

Brian Joseph Barnes (2 March 1934 – 10 April 2024) was a British swimmer. Barnes competed in the men's 200 metre breaststroke at the 1952 Summer Olympics where he was 31st. At the ASA National British Championships he won the 220 yards butterfly title in 1953. Barnes died on 10 April 2024, at the age of 90.
