= Simon Militis =

English swimmer

Personal information
- Full name: Simon Paul Militis
- Nickname: Chunk/Big Si
- National team: Great Britain
- Born: 21 September 1977 (age 48) Saint Helier, Jersey, Channel Islands
- Height: 1.85 m (6 ft 1 in)
- Weight: 100 kg (220 lb)

Sport
- Sport: Swimming
- Strokes: Backstroke, medley
- Club: Portsmouth Northsea Swim Club
- Coach: Chris Nesbitt
Medal record
Men's swimming
Representing England
Commonwealth Games
Bronze medal – third place	2002 Manchester	200 m backstroke

Simon Paul Militis (born 21 September 1977, Jersey) is a male English former competitive swimmer, who specialized in backstroke and individual medley events.

== Swimming career ==
He is a single-time Olympian (2000), a British swimming champion in the 200 metres backstroke (1996 & 2001) and 400 metres individual medley (2000 & 2001), and a bronze medalist at the 2002 Commonwealth Games in Manchester, representing his adopted nation England. During his sporting career, Militis also trained for the Portsmouth Northsea Swim Club under head coach Chris Nesbitt.

Militis competed in two swimming events, as a member of Team GB, at the 2000 Summer Olympics in Sydney. He eclipsed FINA A-standards of 2:00.75 (200 m backstroke) and 4:20.07 (400 m individual medley) from the British Olympic Trials in Sheffield, England. On the second day of the Games, Militis placed twenty-fourth in the 400 m individual medley. Swimming in heat four, he held off Austria's Michael Windisch to save a seventh spot by 0.24 of a second in 4:24.38. Three days later, in the 200 m backstroke, Militis challenged seven other swimmers in heat six, including his teammate Adam Ruckwood, Australia's top favorite Matt Welsh, and U.S. world record holder Lenny Krayzelburg. He fell short to sixth place by just 0.09 seconds apart from Ruckwood in a time of 2:01.20. Militis missed the semifinals by only a small fraction of a second, as he placed nineteenth overall in the prelims.

In 2001, Militis became the first ever British swimmer to race under a 4:20 barrier in the 400 m individual medley from the national trials, breaking a new British record of 4.19.90. He also powered home with a 200 m backstroke title in 2:02.73, more than a second off his personal best.

At the 2002 Commonwealth Games in Manchester, England, Militis enjoyed the race by a massive roar of a delightful home crowd, as he wrested a bronze in 2:01.04, handing an entire medal lock for Great Britain with a one–two–three finish.

== See also ==
- List of Commonwealth Games medallists in swimming (men)
