= Jenni Burke =

Australian swimmer

Personal information
- Born: 1971 or 1972 (age 53–54)
Medal record
Women's swimming
Representing Australia
Commonwealth Games
Gold medal – first place	1986 Edinburgh	4 × 200m freestyle relay
Bronze medal – third place	1986 Edinburgh	400m freestyle
Bronze medal – third place	1986 Edinburgh	800m freestyle
Australian Swimming Championships
Gold medal – first place	1984 Brisbane	4 × 200m freestyle relay
Gold medal – first place	1985 Melbourne	200m freestlye
Silver medal – second place	1986 Adelaide	400m freestyle
Bronze medal – third place	1985 Melbourne	400m freestyle

Jennifer Louise Burke (born 1971 or 1972) is an Australian former swimmer.

Burke competed at the Australian Swimming Championships where she won a gold medal in the 4 × 200m freestyle relay event in 1984, a gold medal in the 200m freestyle event and a bronze medal in the 400m freestyle event in 1985, and a silver medal in the 400m freestyle event in 1986.

She competed at the 1986 Commonwealth Games where she won a gold medal in the 4 × 200m freestyle relay event and bronze medals in the 400m freestyle and 800m freestyle events.
