= Helen Slatter =

British swimmer

Personal information
- Full name: Helen Mary Slatter
- Nationality: British
- Born: 7 June 1970 (age 56) King's Lynn
- Height: 1.75 m (5 ft 9 in)
- Weight: 67 kg (148 lb)

Sport
- Sport: Swimming
- Strokes: Backstroke, Butterfly

Helen Mary Slatter (born 7 June 1970) is an English former swimmer.

== Swimming career ==
Born in King's Lynn, Norfolk, she represented Great Britain at the Olympic Games in 1988, 1992 and 1996, Her international results include finishing 11th in the 200m backstroke at the 1991 World Championships and 13th in the 100m backstroke at the 1996 Olympic Games.

She represented England in the 100 metres backstroke, at the 1990 Commonwealth Games in Auckland, New Zealand. Four years later she competed five events in the backstroke, butterfly and individual medley events, at the 1994 Commonwealth Games and made a third appearance at the 1998 Commonwealth Games when competing in the 100 metres backstroke event.

She won the 1994 ASA National British Championships title in the 200 metres butterfly and the 1992 and 1994 ASA National Championship title in the 400 metres medley.

== International competitions ==
Year	Competition	Venue	Position	Event	Notes
Representing Great Britain / England
1988	Olympic Games	Seoul, South Korea	22nd	200 m backstroke	2:21.66
1990	Commonwealth Games	Auckland, New Zealand	9th	100 m backstroke	1:06.17
1991	World Championships	Perth, Australia	14th	100 m backstroke	1:05.20
1991	World Championships	Perth, Australia	11th	200 m backstroke	2:16.83
1991	World Championships	Perth, Australia	13th	400 m medley	4:55.77
1992	Olympic Games	Barcelona, Spain	24th	200 m butterfly	2:20.45
1992	Olympic Games	Barcelona, Spain	26th	200m medley	2:22.04
1992	Olympic Games	Barcelona, Spain	23rd	400 m medley	4:58.24
1994	Commonwealth Games	Victoria, Canada	10th	100 m backstroke	1:04.70
1994	Commonwealth Games	Victoria, Canada	12th	100 m butterfly	1:04.55
1994	Commonwealth Games	Victoria, Canada	5th	200 m butterfly	2:16.15
1994	Commonwealth Games	Victoria, Canada	9th	200 m medley	2:21.46
1994	Commonwealth Games	Victoria, Canada	7th	400 m medley	4:58.33
1996	Olympic Games	Atlanta, United States	13th	100 m backstroke	1:03.61
1996	Olympic Games	Atlanta, United States	13th	4 × 100 m medley	1:03.87
1998	Commonwealth Games	Kuala Lumpur, Malaysia	12th	100 m backstroke	1:04.98
