= Michael Windisch =

Austrian swimmer

Personal information
- Full name: Michael Windisch
- National team: Austria
- Born: 9 August 1976 (age 50) Kimberley, Northern Cape, South Africa
- Height: 1.90 m (6 ft 3 in)
- Weight: 85 kg (187 lb)

Sport
- Sport: Swimming
- Strokes: Butterfly, medley
- Club: Wolfsberger SV
- College team: Nebraska Cornhuskers (US)
- Coach: Rick Paine (AUS); Cal Bentz (US)

Michael Windisch (born 9 August 1976) is an Austrian former swimmer, who specialized in butterfly and in individual medley events. He is a 2000 Olympian and a member of Wolfsberger Swimming Club in Wolfsberg, Carinthia. While studying in the United States, Windisch was named to the men's GTE Academic All-American athletes' team for the fall season. Although he was born in South Africa, Windisch held a dual residency status to compete internationally for his parents' homeland Austria.

Windisch accepted an athletic scholarship to attend the University of Nebraska–Lincoln in Lincoln, Nebraska, where he majored in international business, and swam for the Nebraska Cornhuskers swimming and diving team under head coach Cal Bentz. While swimming for the Cornhuskers, he received five All-American honours, and set school records in the 500-yard freestyle (4:22.01) and 1650-yard freestyle (15:17.19). He finished fourth in the 400-yard individual medley (3:45.40) at the 2000 NCAA championships, and was also named to the men's GTE Academic All-American athletes' team for the fall season.

Windisch competed in three individual events for Austria at the 2000 Summer Olympics in Sydney. He achieved a FINA A-cut of 4:22.94 (400 m individual medley) from the US National Championships in Federal Way, Washington. On the second day of the Games, Windisch placed twenty-sixth in the 400 m individual medley. Swimming in heat four, he rounded out the field to last place by 0.24 of a second behind Great Britain's Simon Militis in 4:24.62. Two days later, in the 200 m butterfly, Windisch established an Austrian record of 2:01.20 from heat three, but his time was only enough to pull off a twenty-eighth-place effort. In his final event, 200 m individual medley, Windisch could not achieve his best result on the morning prelims, finishing in twenty-seventh place with a time of 2:05.15.
