= British swimming champions – 200 metres medley winners =

British swimming event

The British swimming champions over 200 metres individual medley, formerly the (Amateur Swimming Association (ASA) National Championships) are listed below.

The event was originally contested over 220 yards and then switched to the metric conversion of 200 metres in 1971.

== 200 metres individual medley champions ==
Year	Men's champion	Women's champion
	220 yards	220 yards
1966	Alan Kimber	Judith Turnbull
1967	Peter Reynolds	Shelagh Ratcliffe
1968	Martyn Woodroffe	Shelagh Ratcliffe
1969	Martyn Woodroffe	Shelagh Ratcliffe
1970	Martyn Woodroffe	Shelagh Ratcliffe
	200 metres	200 metres
1971	Brian Brinkley	Denise Banks
1972	Raymond Terrell	Susan Richardson
1973	Brian Brinkley	Diane Walker
1974	David Wilkie	Leslie Cliff
1975	David Wilkie	Anne Adams
1976	Jim Carter	Sharron Davies
1977	Duncan Cleworth	Sharron Davies
1978	Duncan Cleworth	Sharron Davies
1979		
1980	Robin Brew	Sharron Davies
1981	Gareth Sykes	Annemarie Verstappen
1982	Ian Collins	June Croft
1983	Robin Brew	Maria Scott
1984	Paul Brew	Kate Jackson
1985	Stuart Willmott	Zara Long
1986	Paul Brew	Zara Long
1987	Gary Binfield	Zara Long
1988	Neil Cochran	Marianne Muis
1989	Grant Robins	Sharron Davies
1990	Grant Robins	Zara Long
1991	John Davey	Zara Long
1992	John Davey	Sharron Davies
1993	Fraser Walker	Lucy Findlay
1994	David Warren	Sue Rolph
1995	Fraser Walker	Sue Rolph
1996	David Warren	Kathy Read-Osher
1997	Tatsuya Kinugasa	Sue Rolph
1998	James Hickman	Sue Rolph
1999	Mark Racher	Sue Rolph
2000	James Hickman	Sue Rolph
2001	Adrian Turner	Kathryn Evans
2002	Robin Francis	Kathryn Evans
2003	Robin Francis	Sarah Heyes
2004	Robin Francis	Sophie Caul
2005	Robin Francis	Stacey Tadd
2006	Joseph Roebuck	Terri Dunning
2007	Euan Dale	Hannah Miley
2008	James Goddard	Hannah Miley
2009	James Goddard	Hannah Miley
2010	James Goddard	Hannah Miley
2011	James Goddard	Hannah Miley
2012	Joseph Roebuck	Hannah Miley
2013	Roberto Pavoni	Sophie Allen
2014	Roberto Pavoni	Siobhan-Marie O'Connor
2015	Roberto Pavoni	Siobhan-Marie O'Connor
2016	Roberto Pavoni	Siobhan-Marie O'Connor
2017	Max Litchfield	Hannah Miley
2018	James Guy	Siobhan-Marie O'Connor
2019	Duncan Scott	Siobhan-Marie O'Connor
Not held during 2020 and 2021 due to the COVID-19 pandemic
2022	Duncan Scott	Abbie Wood
2023	Tom Dean	Katie Shanahan
2024	Duncan Scott	Abbie Wood
2025	Duncan Scott	Abbie Wood
2026	Duncan Scott	Abbie Wood

== See also ==
- Aquatics GB
- List of British Swimming champions
