= Tom Ponting =

Canadian swimmer (born 1965)

Personal information
- Full name: Thomas Harold Ponting
- Nickname: "Tom"
- National team: Canada
- Born: January 28, 1965 (age 61) Montreal, Quebec, Canada
- Height: 1.80 m (5 ft 11 in)
- Weight: 84 kg (185 lb)

Sport
- Sport: Swimming
- Strokes: Butterfly
- College team: University of Calgary
Medal record
Men's swimming
Representing Canada
Olympic Games
Silver medal – second place	1984 Los Angeles	4×100 m medley
Silver medal – second place	1988 Seoul	4×100 m medley
Bronze medal – third place	1992 Barcelona	4×100 m medley
Pan Pacific Games
Silver medal – second place	1987 Brisbane	200 m butterfly
Bronze medal – third place	1985 Tokyo	200 m medley
Commonwealth Games
Gold medal – first place	1986 Edinburgh	4×100 m medley
Gold medal – first place	1990 Auckland	4×100 m medley
Pan American Games
Silver medal – second place	1983 Caracas	4x100 m medley
Summer Universiade
Bronze medal – third place	1983 Edmonton	100 m butterfly

Thomas Harold Ponting (born January 28, 1965) is a Canadian former competitive swimmer who specialized in the butterfly stroke. Ponting competed in three consecutive Summer Olympics for Canada starting with the 1984 Summer Olympic Games in Los Angeles, California. At every occasion he won a medal with the men's 4 × 100 m medley relay team: two silver and one bronze.

At the Canadian Interuniversity Sport (CIS) swimming championships in 1989, Ponting broke the world and Canadian records in the 100-metre butterfly, with a time of 52.62 seconds, which still stands as the CIS record. According to the Team Canada Web site in 2025, Ponting is one of only two swimmers in Canadian history to win three Olympic medals in three different Olympic Games (1992, 1988 and 1984).

World Record Short Course:

- 4 × 100 m medley relay (1991)
- 4 × 100 m medley relay (1992)
- 100 m butterfly - 52.62 (1989)

== See also ==
- List of Commonwealth Games medallists in swimming (men)
- List of Olympic medalists in swimming (men)
- World record progression 4 × 100 metres medley relay
