= Kevin Crosby =

English swimmer

Personal information
- Nationality: England

Sport
- Sport: Swimming
- Club: Warrington Warriors

Kevin Crosby is a male former swimmer who competed for England.

== Swimming career ==
Crosby was twice the British champion over 200 metres butterfly in 1991 and 1993. He represented England in the butterfly events, at the 1994 Commonwealth Games in Victoria, British Columbia, Canada.

He swan for the City of Warrington Warriors Swimming Club.
