= John Davey (swimmer) =

British swimmer (born 1964)

Personal information
- Full name: John Philip Davey
- National team: Great Britain
- Born: 29 December 1964 (age 61) Middleton, England
- Height: 1.72 m (5 ft 8 in)
- Weight: 70 kg (150 lb; 11 st)

Sport
- Sport: Swimming
- Strokes: Freestyle, medley
- Club: Aquabears
- College team: University of Iowa (US)
Medal record
Men's swimming
Representing England
Commonwealth Games
Silver medal – second place	1982 Brisbane	4×200 m freestyle
Bronze medal – third place	1982 Brisbane	400 m freestyle
Bronze medal – third place	1982 Brisbane	400 m medley
Bronze medal – third place	1986 Edinburgh	4×200 m freestyle

John Philip Davey (born 29 December 1964) is an English former competition swimmer.

== Swimming career ==
He swam for Great Britain in the Olympics and later became a collegiate head coach in the United States. He competed at the Summer Olympics in 1988 in Seoul, South Korea, and in 1992 in Barcelona, Spain.

At the 1982 Commonwealth Games in Brisbane, Australia, representing England he earned a silver medal as a member of the second-place English men's team in the 4x200-metre freestyle relay. Individually, he won bronze medals in both the 400-metre freestyle and 400-metre individual medley. Four years later at the 1986 Commonwealth Games in Edinburgh, he won another bronze medal as part of the English men's team in the 4x200-metre freestyle relay. He represented England at a third Games when competing in the freestyle and individual medley events, at the 1990 Commonwealth Games in Auckland, New Zealand.

He is a two times winner of the ASA National British Championships 200 metres freestyle in 1982 and 1984 and was the 400 metres freestyle champion in 1983 and 1984. He was also the ASA National British Championships 100 metres backstroke champion in 1984 and 200 metres backstroke champion three times in 1983, 1984 and 1987 and 200 metres medley champion in 1991 and 1992 and the 400 metres medley champion in 1983, 1986, 1987 and 1988.

Davey received an athletic scholarship to attend the University of Iowa, in Iowa City, Iowa, United States, where he competed for the Iowa Hawkeyes swimming and diving team from 1985 to 1989. He was a ten-time champion in Big Ten Conference competition, and received ten All-American honors as a Hawkeye swimmer.

== Coaching ==
He graduated from the university with a bachelor's degree in exercise science in 1989. Between 1991 and 1992 he was an assistant swim coach at Ohio State University (US) and the head coach at the University of Wisconsin–Madison (US) from 1992 to 1994. Between 1998 and 2004, he was the head coach of the Iowa Hawkeyes swimming and diving team at his alma mater, the University of Iowa. In 1999, he was inducted into the University of Iowa Athletics Hall of Fame. He later would resign the Iowa head coach position in the middle of the season, due to violating NCAA's eligibility rules. He now lives in Des Moines, Iowa.

== See also ==
- List of Commonwealth Games medallists in swimming (men)
