= Grant Robins =

Personal information
- Nationality: English
- Born: 1969 (age 55–56) Portsmouth, Hampshire, England

Sport
- Club: Portsmouth Northsea Swimming Club

Grant Alan Robins (born 1969), is a male former swimmer who competed for England.

== Swimming career ==
Robins became a National champion after winning the 1991 ASA National Championship in the 200 metres backstroke. He then successfully defended his title the following year. He also won the 200 metres medley title in 1989 and 1990 and the 400 metres medley in 1992 and 1993.

Robins represented England in the 100 metres and 200 metres backstroke and the 200 metres individual medley, at the 1990 Commonwealth Games in Auckland, New Zealand.
