= Beatty Park =

Swimming pool in Perth, Western Australia

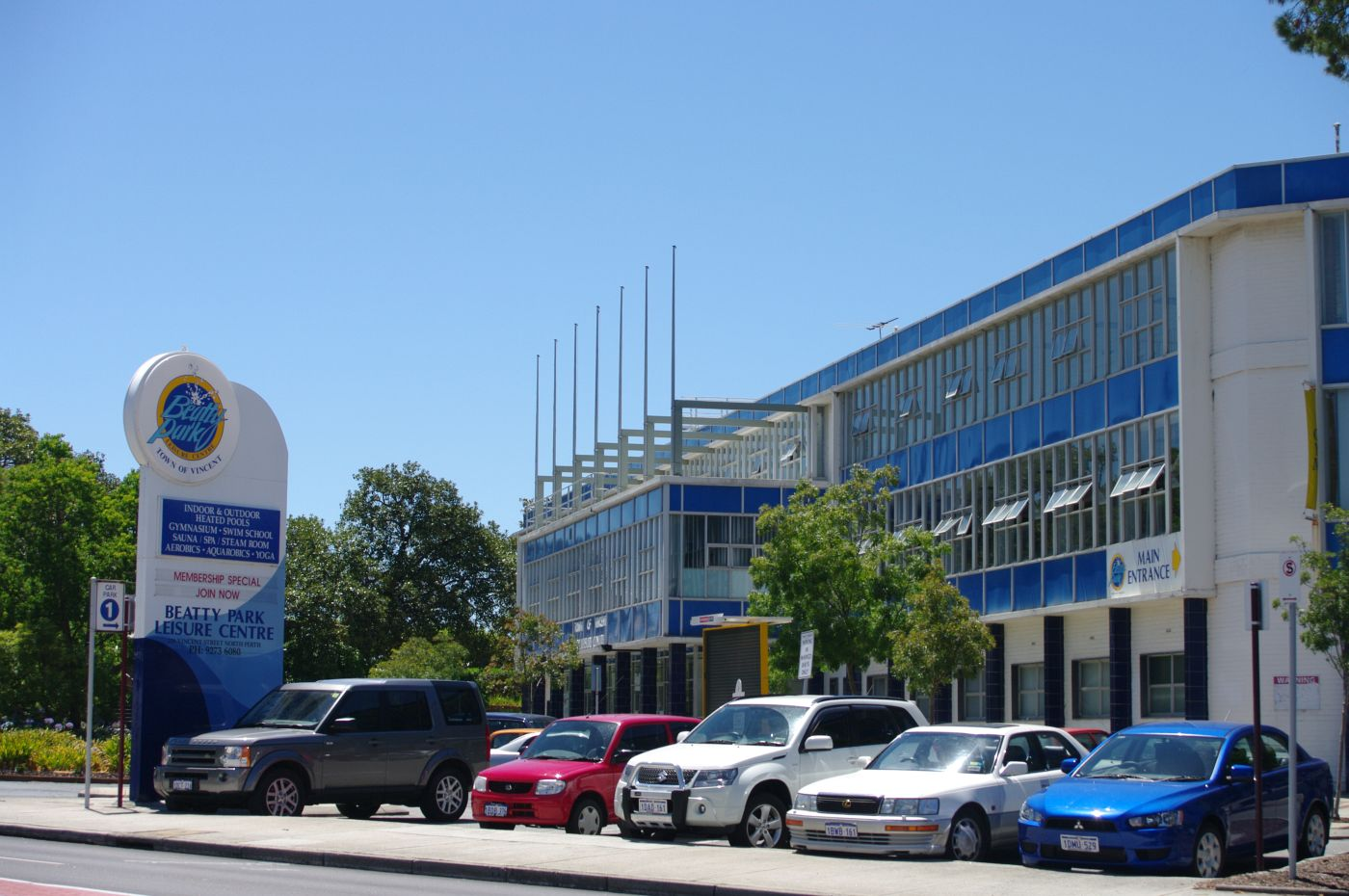
- Beatty Park entrance

- Location within Perth
- Former names: Beatty Park Aquatic Centre

General information
- Type: Swimming pool
- Location: North Perth, Western Australia
- Coordinates: 31°56′8″S 115°50′56″E

Western Australia Heritage Register
- Designated: 17 December 2004
- Reference no.: 3553

Beatty Park Leisure Centre is a swimming pool complex in the suburb of North Perth, Western Australia. Originally known as the Beatty Park Aquatic Centre, it was built for the 1962 British Empire and Commonwealth Games as the major swimming event venue, along with the Perry Lakes Stadium athletics complex.

== History ==
Prior to the construction of the aquatics centre for the 1962 Perth Games, the area was part of a large reserve known as Beatty Park.

The centre was refurbished in 1994 to include creche, spa and gymnasium facilities as well as several indoor pools. It has spectator seating for approximately 5,000 people and is administered by the City of Vincent.

Another major redevelopment took place from 2011 to 2013, costing $17 million. This redevelopment included the installation of a geothermal bore for heating the upgraded pools and expanding the health and fitness facilities to include a 750 m^{2} (8,100 sq ft) gym, two Group Fitness studios and a new entry.

== 1962 Games ==
Commonwealth records were set at Beatty Park in the following events:

Men's 110 yards backstroke	Graham Sykes (ENG)	1.04.5 (mins)
Men's 110 yards butterfly	Kevin Berry (AUS)	0:59.5 (mins)
Women's 110 yards freestyle	Dawn Fraser (AUS)	0:59.5 (seconds)
Men's 1650 yards freestyle	Murray Rose (AUS)	17:18.1 (mins)
Men's 220 yards butterfly	Kevin Berry (AUS)	2:10.8 (mins)
