= Tamás Deutsch (swimmer) =

Hungarian swimmer (born 1969)

Personal information
- Born: 4 December 1969 (age 56) Budapest, Hungary
- Height: 1.88 m (6 ft 2 in)

Sport
- Sport: Swimming
- Strokes: Backstroke
- Club: Budapesti Honvéd Sportegyesület
Medal record
World Championships (LC)
Bronze medal – third place	1994 Rome	100 m backstroke
Bronze medal – third place	1994 Rome	4×100 m medley
World Championships (SC)
Bronze medal – third place	1995 Rio de Janeiro	200 m backstroke
European Championships (LC)
Silver medal – second place	1993 Sheffield	4×100 m medley
Silver medal – second place	1995 Vienna	4×100 m medley
Bronze medal – third place	1991 Athens	4×100 m medley
European Junior Championships (LC)
Gold medal – first place	1985 Geneva	200 m backstroke
Silver medal – second place	1985 Geneva	100 m bacstroke

Tamás Deutsch (born 4 December 1969 in Budapest) is a Hungarian former backstroke swimmer.

== Swimming career ==
Deutsch competed in three consecutive Summer Olympics for his native country, starting in 1988. He won a bronze medal over 200 m at the 1995 FINA Short Course World Championships. Despite being of Hungarian nationality he won the ASA National British Championships 200 metres backstroke title in 1990.

He competed in the 1989 Maccabiah Games, in Israel.
