= Samantha Purvis =

British retired swimmer (born 1967)

Personal information
- Born: 24 June 1967 (age 59) Sunderland, Tyne and Wear, England

Sport
- Sport: Swimming
Medal record
Swimming
Representing England
Commonwealth Games
Bronze medal – third place	1986 Edinburgh	100m butterfly

Samantha Purvis (born 24 June 1967) is a retired British swimmer.

== Early life ==
She lived in Chilton, County Durham, but moved to Hartburn, County Durham in 1984.

== Career ==
Purvis competed at the 1984 Summer Olympics and the 1992 Summer Olympics. She represented England and won a bronze medal in the 100 metres butterfly, at the 1986 Commonwealth Games in Edinburgh, Scotland. Four years later she represented England in the butterfly and medley events, at the 1990 Commonwealth Games in Auckland, New Zealand. She also won the ASA National Championship title in the 100 metres butterfly three times (1984, 1985, 1987) and the 200 metres butterfly three times (1984, 1985, 1989).
