= Brunswick Baths =

Coordinates: 37.7711°S 144.9597°E

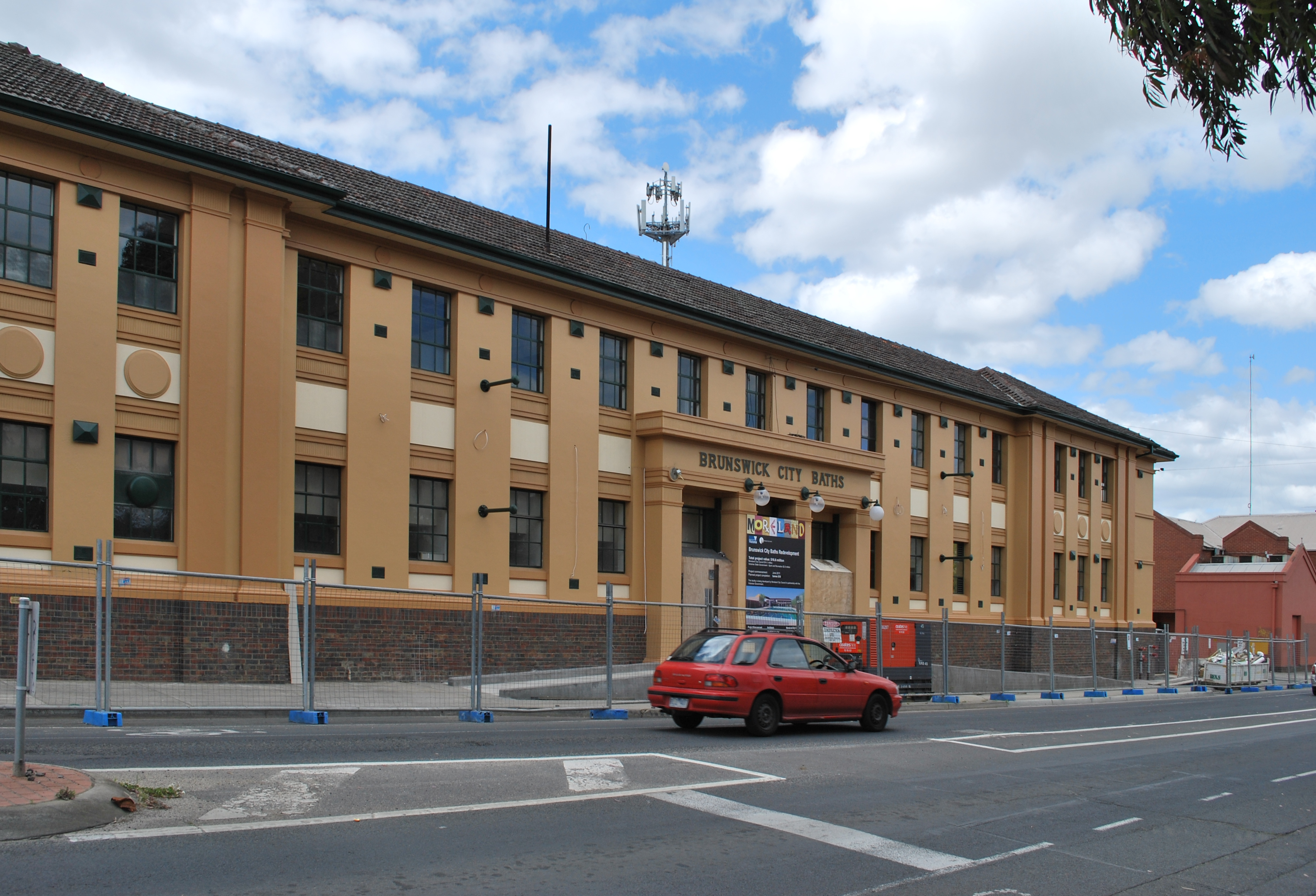
- Interactive map of the Brunswick Baths area

General information
- Location: Corner of Dawson Street and Sydney Road, Brunswick, Melbourne, Australia

Brunswick Baths is a local government heritage-listed building in Brunswick, an inner-city suburb of Melbourne, Victoria, Australia.

The building was designed in 1913 by architecture firm Peck & Kemter and built in 1914. Peck & Kemter also designed the "Ryder Stand" at Victoria Park, the former home ground of the Collingwood Football Club.

The Baths were renovated in 1927 and again between 2011 and 2013.
