= Diving Australia =

Sports governing body

- Sport: Diving
- Jurisdiction: Australia
- Abbreviation: DA
- Affiliation: World Aquatics
- Headquarters: Chandler, Queensland
- CEO: Alex Newton

Official website
- www.diving.org.au
- (Australia)

Diving Australia is the organisation that oversees the sport of Diving in Australia. It is affiliated to Sport Australia, World Aquatics and Oceania Aquatics. It has its headquarters in Chandler, Brisbane, Queensland.

Domestic events run by Diving Australia each year include the Australian Open Championships, Australian Junior Championships, Australian Age Championships and Australian Skills Championships. It is also hosts World Aquatics Recognised Events such as the Southern Cross Diving Series - Australian Leg and the Australian Diving Cup.

Diving Australia oversees 6 state sporting organisations that organise state-level competitions that provide a qualifying pathway to national competitions.
