= Tony Day =

British swimmer (born 1965)

Personal information
- Full name: John Anthony Day
- Born: 14 April 1965 (age 61) St Asaph, Denbighshire, Wales

Sport
- Sport: Swimming
Medal record
Representing Great Britain
Summer Universiade
| Bronze medal – third place | 1985 Kobe | 1500m freestyle |

John Anthony Day (born 14 April 1965) is a British swimmer. Day competed in two events at the 1988 Summer Olympics. He also won the 1984 and 1988 ASA British National 1500 metres freestyle title.
