= Geoffrey Stewart (swimmer) =

English swimmer

Personal information
- Nationality: English
Medal record
Swimming
Representing England
Commonwealth Games
Bronze medal – third place	1986 Edinburgh	freestyle relay

Geoffrey Stewart is a male former swimmer who competed for England.

== Swimming career ==
Stewart represented England and won a bronze medal in the 4 x 100 metres freestyle relay, at the 1986 Commonwealth Games in Edinburgh, Scotland.
