= Madeleine Campbell =

British swimmer

Personal information
- Born: 18 August 1964 (age 61) Portsmouth, England

Sport
- Sport: Swimming

Madeleine Campbell (born 18 August 1964) is a British swimmer. She competed in two events at the 1992 Summer Olympics.
