= Zara Long =

British swimmer (born 1970)

Personal information
- Born: 6 November 1970 (age 55) Dulwich, London, England

Sport
- Sport: Swimming
Medal record
Swimming
Representing England
Commonwealth Games
Silver medal – second place	1986 Edinburgh	4x100m freestyle relay
Silver medal – second place	1986 Edinburgh	4x200m freestyle relay
Bronze medal – third place	1990 Auckland	4x100m freestyle relay

Zara Long (born 6 November 1970) is a retired British swimmer.

== Swimming career ==
Long competed at the 1984 Summer Olympics and the 1988 Summer Olympics. She represented England and won two silver medals in the 4 x 100 metres and 4 x 200 metres freestyle relays, at the 1986 Commonwealth Games in Edinburgh, Scotland. Four years later she represented England and won a bronze medal in the 4 x 100 metres freestyle relay, at the 1990 Commonwealth Games in Auckland, New Zealand. She also won the 1987 ASA National British Championships in the 100 metres freestyle and was five times 200 metres medley champion in 1985, 1986, 1987, 1990 and 1991 and twice 400 metres medley champion in 1990 and 1991.
