= Robin Brew =

British swimmer

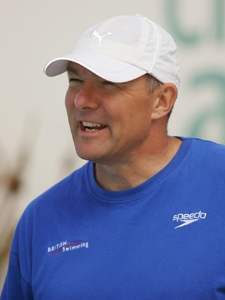

Personal information
- Full name: Robin Brew
- National team: Great Britain
- Born: 28 June 1962 (age 63) Portsmouth, England
- Height: 1.85 m (6 ft 1 in)
- Weight: 94 kg (207 lb; 14.8 st)

Sport
- Sport: Swimming
- Strokes: Freestyle, medley
- Club: Kelly College, Tavistock
Medal record
Men's swimming
Representing Scotland
Commonwealth Games
Silver medal – second place	1982 Brisbane	200 m medley
Bronze medal – third place	1982 Brisbane	4×200 m freestyle

Robin Brew (born 28 June 1962) is a male former competition swimmer for Great Britain and Scotland.

== Swimming career ==
Brew represented Great Britain at the Olympic Games and Scotland in the Commonwealth Games. He swam in the men's 200-metre individual medley at the 1984 Summer Olympics where he came fourth. At the 1984 Los Angeles Olympics he broke the Olympic record in the 200-metre individual medley in the semifinals.

He competed at the Commonwealth Games in 1982, where he won a silver medal in the 200m Individual Medley event and a bronze medal in the 4 x 200m Freestyle Relay, and in 1986.

At the ASA National British Championships he won the 200 metres medley title in 1980 and 1983.

== Personal life ==
Robin Brew held the position as the Director of Swimming at Mount Kelly School, for 16 years after his father Archibald Brew who held the position for 20 years. His brother Paul Brew is also a former international swimmer. Both brothers attended Kelly College. Brew now runs his business RobinBrewSports acting as a triathlon and swim coach.

== See also ==
- List of Commonwealth Games medallists in swimming (men)
