= Adelaide Aquatic Centre =

Indoor swimming pool complex in Adelaide, South Australia

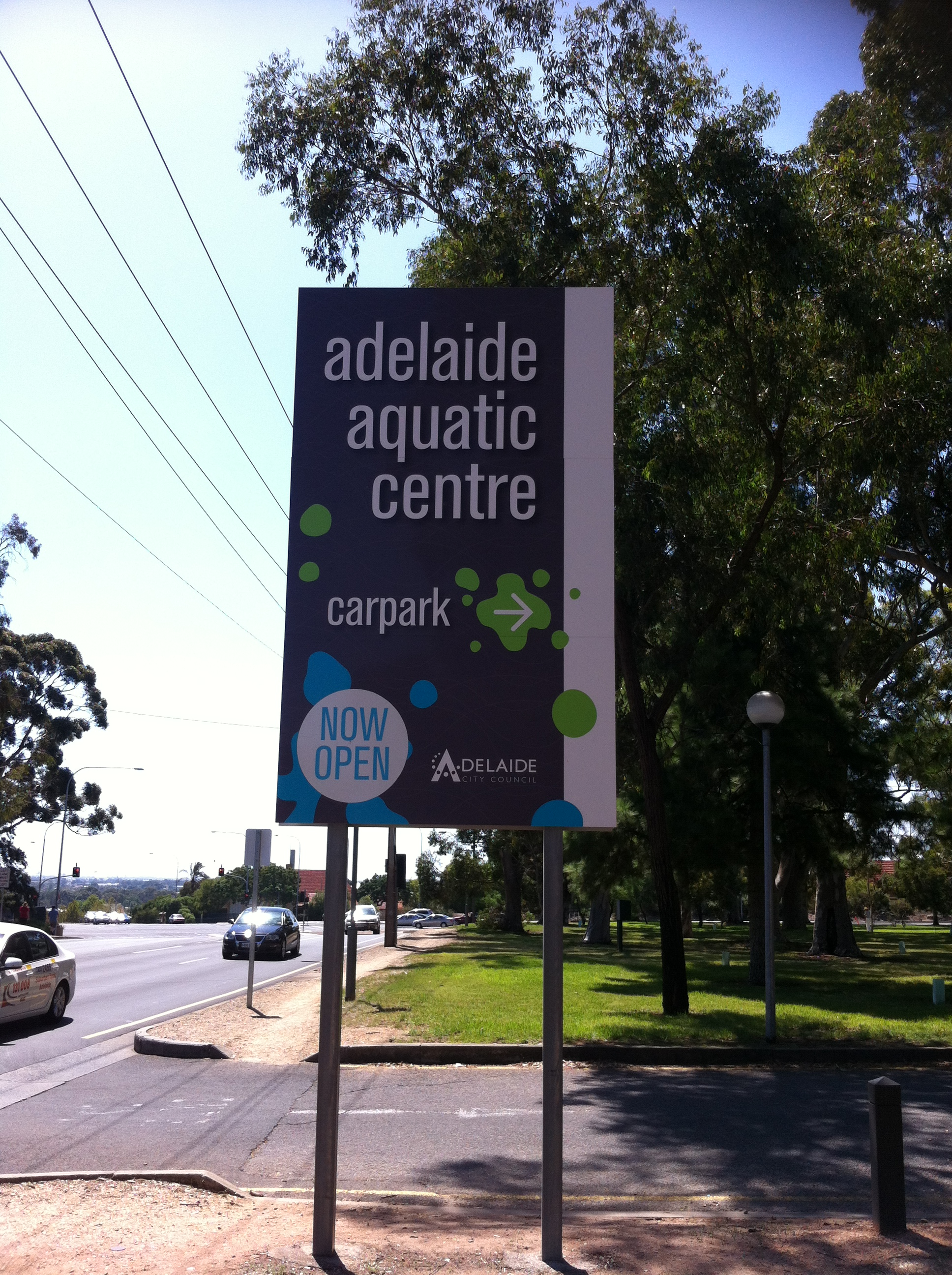
- Interactive map of Adelaide Aquatic Centre
- Full name: Adelaide Aquatic Centre
- Address: Adelaide, Australia
- Coordinates: 34°54′3″S 138°35′27″E

Construction
- Opened: 20 December 1969

The Adelaide Aquatic Centre is a complex of indoor heated swimming pools operated by the Adelaide City Council and located in the northernmost extent of the Adelaide Parklands in North Adelaide, Australia. It is located in the square of parkland bordered by Jeffcott Street, Barton Terrace West, Prospect Road and Fitzroy Terrace. There is a car park to the west whose entrance is off Jeffcott Street, but the entrance to the centre itself faces north, towards Fitzroy Terrace. The centre opened on 20 December 1969.

== Facilities ==
The centre features a 50-metre Olympic-sized swimming pool and a smaller adjacent pool (33m x 21m) used for aqua aerobics, canoe polo, diving, underwater hockey and water polo. These two pools are surrounded on three sides by raised seating for competition spectators. The wet areas also include an octopus-themed 'Octopool' for children's swimming lessons and recreational use, two leisure pools, two water slides, two spas, a dry sauna and a steam room. At extra cost (unless one becomes a member), the centre offers a crèche and a health club equipped with cardio machines, pin-loaded weight machines and free weights. There are also shops providing swimming equipment and food, and an outdoor barbecue area.

== Fees ==
There are separate prices for families, single adults, children, and concession card holders (Health Care Card or full-time tertiary students). to the different areas of the centre, including the pools, sauna, spa and gym. Adelaide Aquatic Centre also offers membership for full access to the centre.

== State of maintenance and future plans ==
Since 2005, peak representative bodies such as Diving Australia, Swimming Australia and the Aquatic Sports Coalition of SA have criticised the condition of facilities at the centre.

There was a plan that in the period April to July 2011 the centre's roof would be replaced as the first stage in upgrading the centre.

Adelaide City Council has reportedly allocated $6 million for a leisure centre conversion for the aquatic centre, but requires additional funding from the state or federal governments to go ahead. The council is to undertake a detailed study on how best to proceed in further upgrading the centre in coming years, to shift its focus from swimming competitions to a family oriented leisure pool facility, along the lines of an indoor waterpark.
