= Marion Madine =

Irish swimmer (born 1970)

Personal information
- Born: 8 December 1970 (age 55)

Sport
- Sport: Swimming

Marion Madine (born 8 December 1970) is an Irish swimmer. She competed in two events at the 1996 Summer Olympics.
