= 1943 in New Zealand =

- Decades: 1920s; 1930s; 1940s; 1950s; 1960s
- See also: History of New Zealand; List of years in New Zealand; Timeline of New Zealand history

The following lists events that happened during 1943 in New Zealand.

== Population ==
- Estimated population as of 31 December: 1,642,000.
- Increase since 31 December 1942: 5600 (0.34%).
- Males per 100 females: 92.9.

== Incumbents ==
=== Regal and viceregal ===
- Head of State – George VI
- Governor-General – Cyril Newall
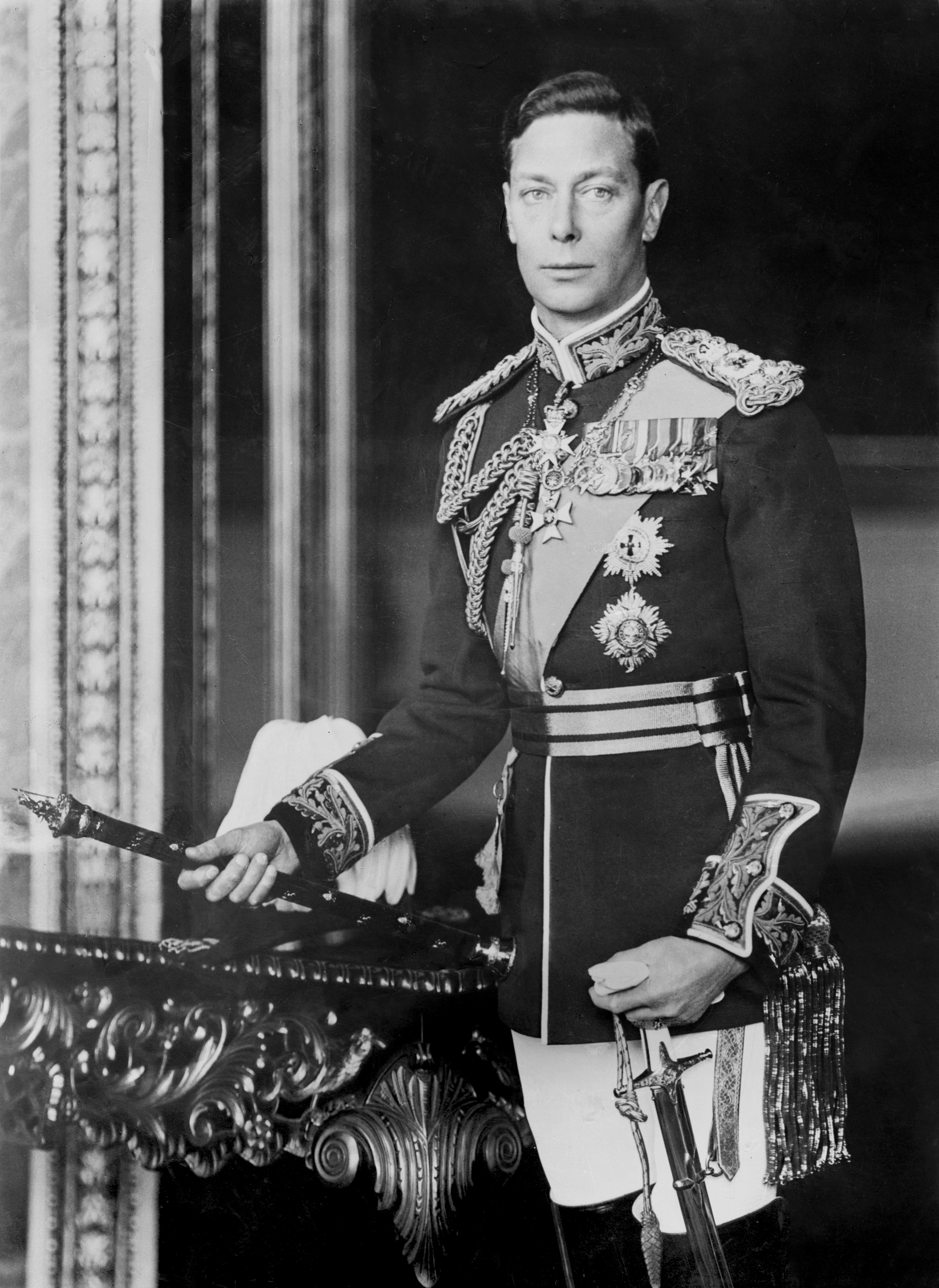
George VI

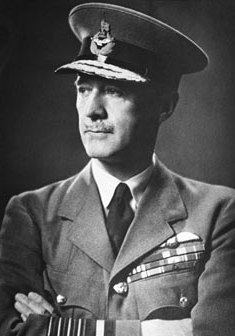
Cyril Newall

=== Government ===
The 26th New Zealand Parliament concluded, with the Labour Party in government. Labour was re-elected for a third term in the election in November

- Speaker of the House – Bill Barnard (Democratic Labour Party)
- Prime Minister – Peter Fraser
- Minister of Finance – Walter Nash
- Minister of Foreign Affairs – Peter Fraser
- Attorney-General – Rex Mason
- Chief Justice – Michael Myers
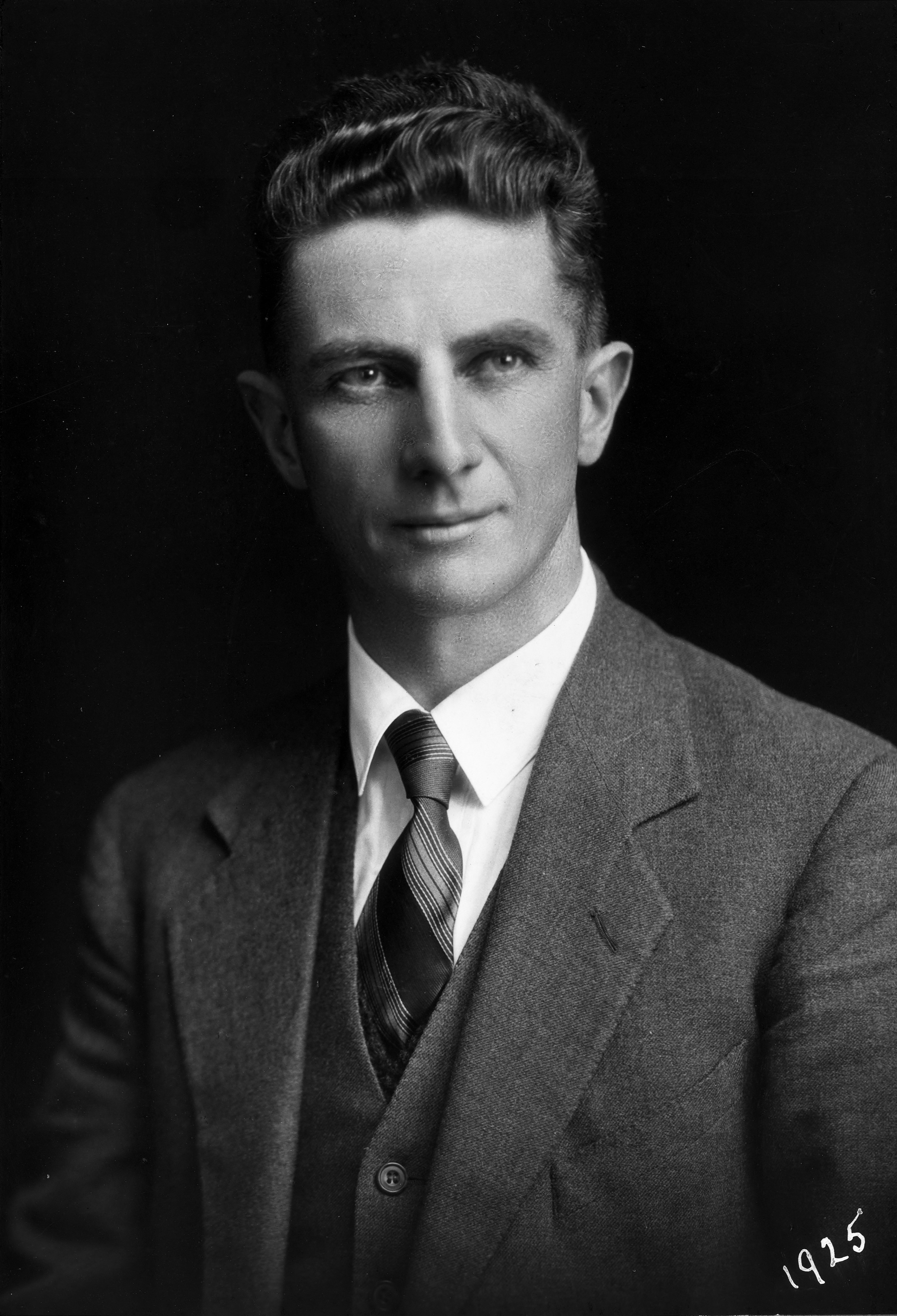
Bill Barnard

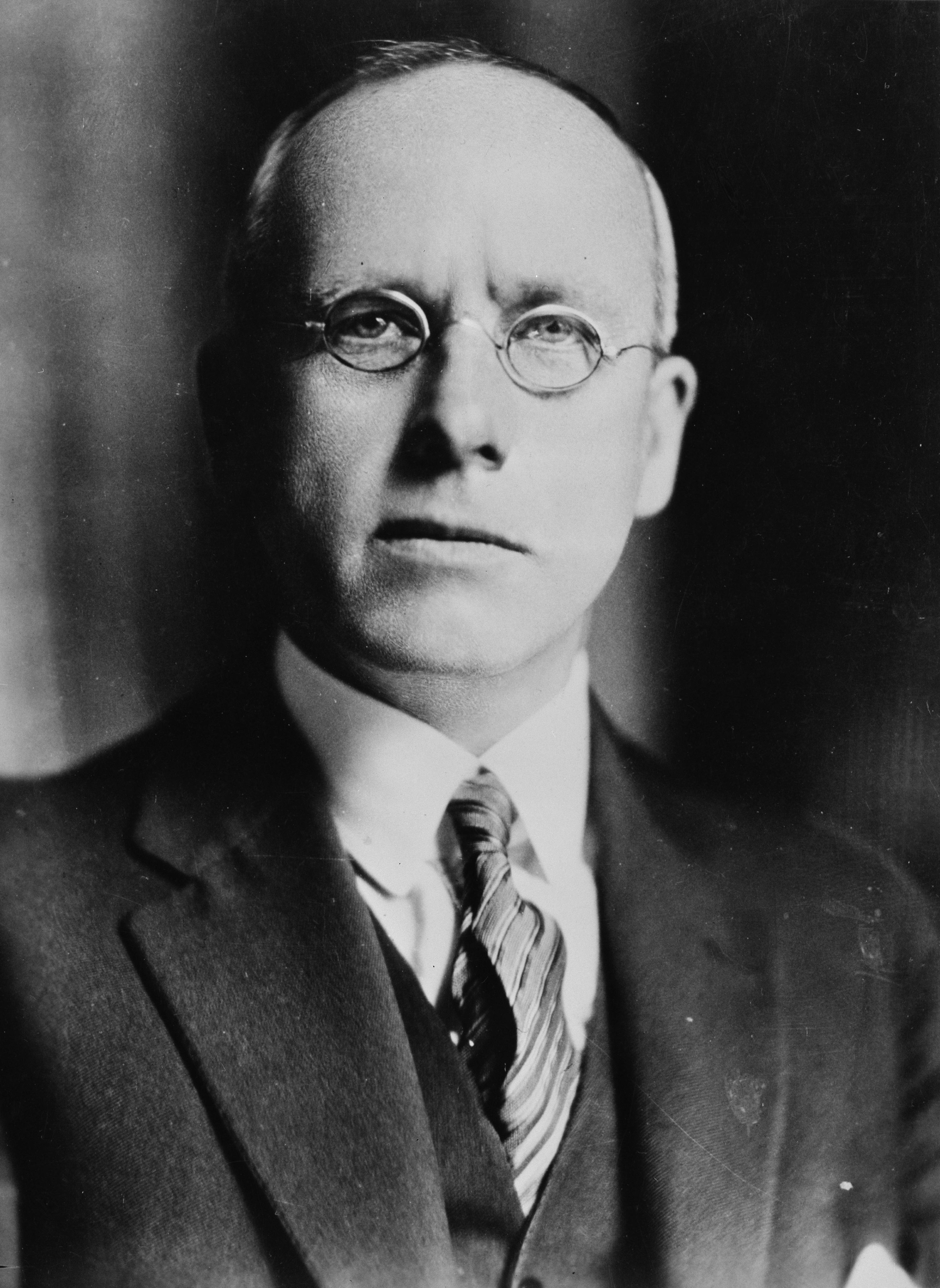
Peter Fraser

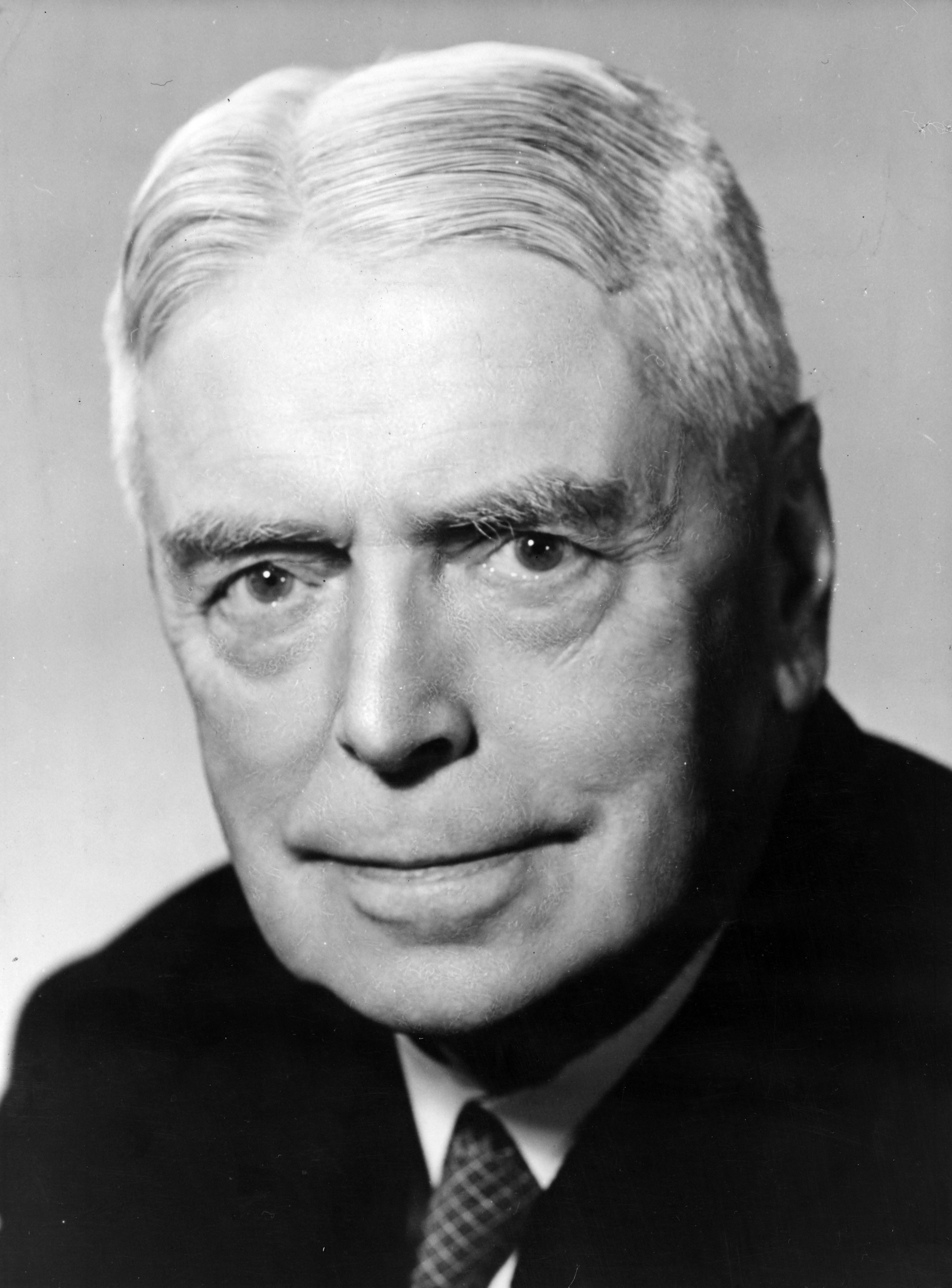
Walter Nash

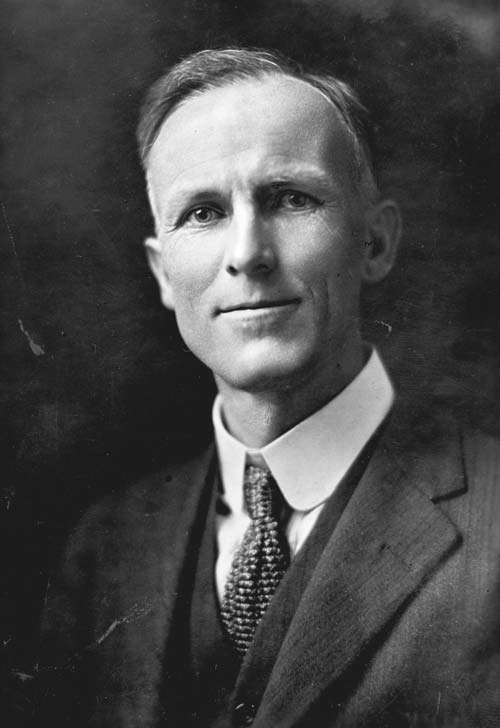
Rex Mason

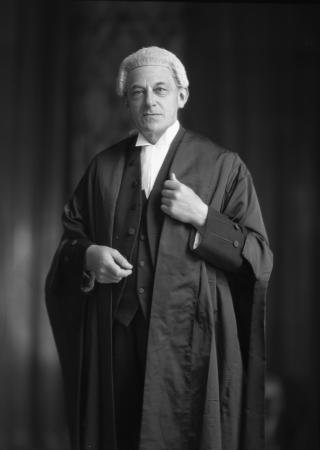
Michael Myers

=== Parliamentary opposition ===
- Leader of the Opposition – Sidney Holland (National Party).

=== Main centre leaders ===
- Mayor of Auckland – John Allum
- Mayor of Wellington – Thomas Hislop
- Mayor of Christchurch – Ernest Andrews
- Mayor of Dunedin – Andrew Allen
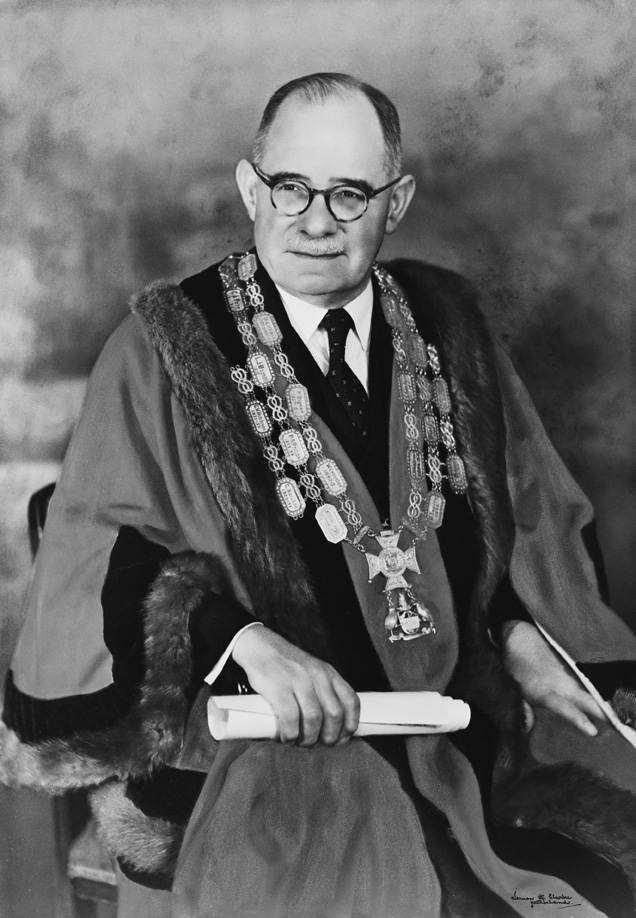
John Allum

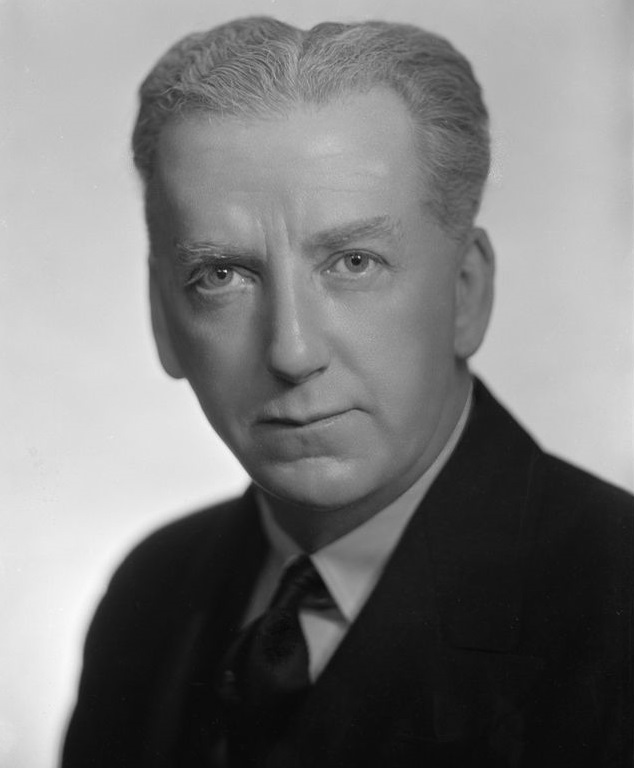
Thomas Hislop

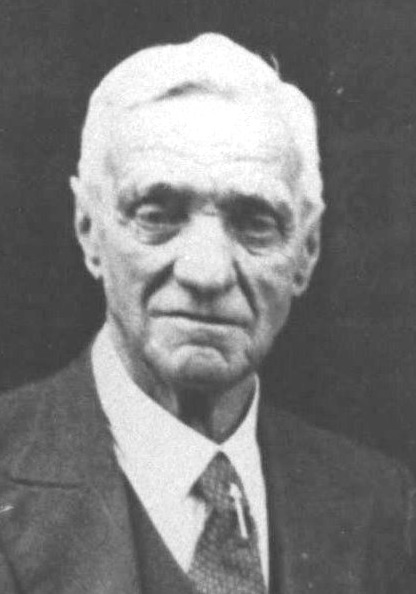
Ernest Andrews

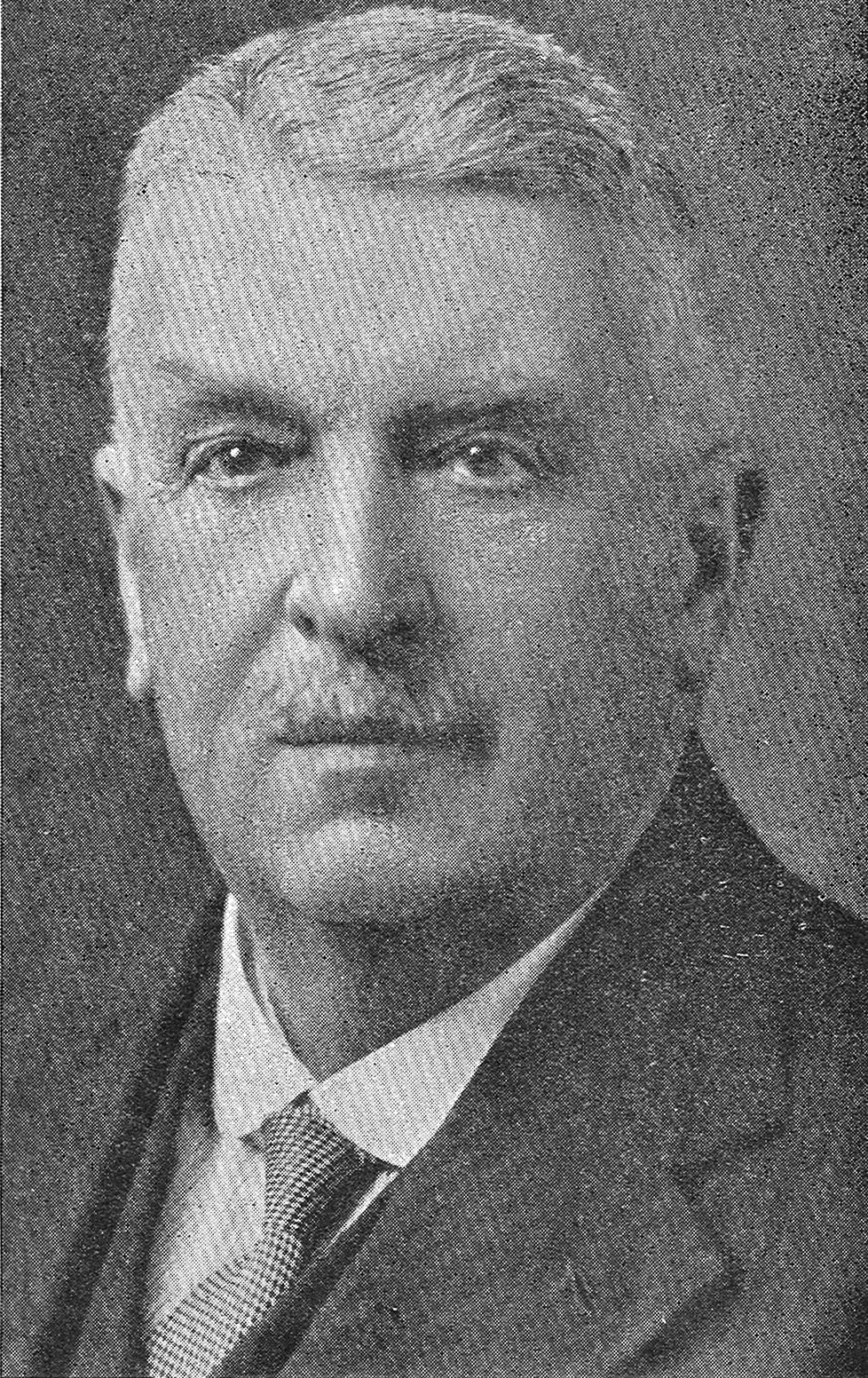
Andrew Allen

== Events ==
- New Zealand troops take part in invasion of Italy.
- 25 February – Mutiny by Japanese prisoners of war at Featherston prisoner of war camp results in 48 Japanese dead, 61 wounded, plus one dead and 11 injured guards.
- 28 March - Body of Michael Joseph Savage reinterred at Bastion Point by a crowd of ten thousand
- 3 April – Battle of Manners Street between American and New Zealand servicemen
- 4 June – Hyde railway disaster – 21 passengers are killed when the Cromwell to Dunedin Express derails while travelling around a bend too fast near Hyde in Central Otago.
- 20 June – Several U.S. Marines drown during landing exercises at Paekākāriki.
- 28 August – Eleanor Roosevelt arrives in New Zealand for visit (she had visited American troops in the Cook Islands).
- 3 September – Eleanor Roosevelt flies out from Auckland.
- 25 September – 1943 New Zealand general election.
- October last US Marines depart US Naval Base New Zealand
- 28 October – Butter rationing is introduced, with an allowance of 8 ounces (230 g) per person per week.
- Japanese submarines operate in New Zealand waters in 1942 and 1943. They send reconnaissance aircraft over Auckland and Wellington, but do not carry out any attacks.

== Arts and literature ==
See 1943 in art, 1943 in literature

=== Music ===
See: 1943 in music

=== Radio ===
See: Public broadcasting in New Zealand

=== Film ===
See: Category:1943 film awards, 1943 in film, List of New Zealand feature films, Cinema of New Zealand, Category:1943 films

== Sport ==
=== Archery ===
The New Zealand Archery Association, now Archery New Zealand, is incorporated.

The first national championships are held. From now until 1947 the championships are a postal shoot.

- Men Open: W. Burton (Gisborne)

=== Horse racing ===
==== Harness racing ====
- New Zealand Trotting Cup: Haughty – 2nd win
- Auckland Trotting Cup: Shadow Maid

=== Rugby union ===
Category:Rugby union in New Zealand, Category:All Blacks

- Ranfurly Shield

=== Soccer ===
- Chatham Cup competition not held
- Provincial league champions:
  - Auckland: Metro College
  - Canterbury: Western
  - Hawke's Bay: Napier HSOB
  - Nelson: No competition
  - Otago: Mosgiel
  - South Canterbury: No competition
  - Southland: No competition
  - Taranaki: RNZAF
  - Waikato: No competition
  - Wanganui: No competition
  - Wellington: Waterside

== Births ==
- 28 January: Malvina Major, opera singer
- 10 March: John McGrath, judge (died 2018)
- 16 March: Dave McKenzie, long-distance runner
- 24 March: Kate Webb, journalist (died 2007)
- 29 March: Diana Hill, scientist (died 2024)
- 6 April: Roger Cook, journalist (died 2026)
- 7 May: Gretchen Albrecht, painter
- 14 May: Eddie Low, country singer and musician (died 2024)
- 12 July: Bruce Taylor, cricketer (died 2021)
- 16 July: Peter Welsh, steeplechase runner
- 20 July: Chris Amon, Formula 1 racing driver (died 2016)
- 19 August: Sid Going, rugby union player (died 2024)
- 9 September: Keith Murdoch, rugby union player (died 2018)
- 11 September: Brian Perkins, radio broadcaster in Britain (BBC)
- 15 October (in Bosnia): Drago Došen, painter (died 2019)
- 21 October: John Robertson (composer)
- 24 October: Martin Campbell, film and television director
- 27 October: Tom Lister, rugby union player (died 2017)
- 7 November: Silvia Cartwright, judge
- 16 November: Chris Laidlaw, All Black, diplomat, politician and radio host
- 24 November: Barry Milburn, cricketer
- 26 November: Adrienne Simpson, broadcaster, historian, musicologist and writer (died 2010)
- 17 December: (in Ireland): Bert Hawthorne, motor racing driver (died 1972)
- 25 December: Hedley Howarth, cricketer (died 2008)
- Mel Courtney, politician
- Brian Easton, economist
- Richard (Dick) Frizzell, artist
- Alamein Kopu, politician (died 2011)
- Georgina te Heuheu, politician

== Deaths ==
- 15 January: William Barber, politician.
- 1 February: Frank Worsley, sailor and explorer.
- 6 April: Paraire Karaka Paikea, politician.
- 4 March: Arthur Cook, politician.
- 27 March: Moana-Nui-a-Kiwa Ngarimu, soldier, VC winner.
- 22 May: Alfred Ransom, politician & cabinet minister.
- 27 May: Gordon Coates, 21st Prime Minister of New Zealand.
- 31 May: Dolce Ann Cabot, journalist.
- 21 August: Hilda Hewlett, aviation pioneer.
- 6 September: James Cowan, writer, historian and ethnographer.
- 14 September: Sarah McMurray, woodcarver and craftswoman.
- 24 September: Arthur Withy, journalist and politician.
- 10 October: Emma Maria Walrond, landscape painter.
- 11 October: Matthew Joseph Brodie, second Catholic bishop of Christchurch.
- 20 October: John Rigg, politician.
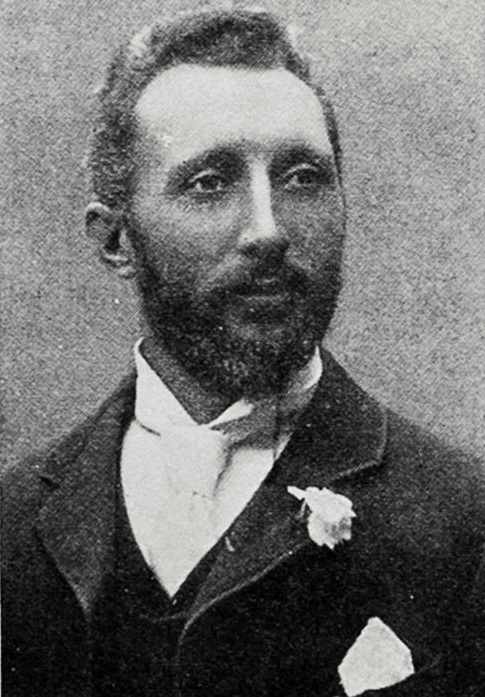
William Barber

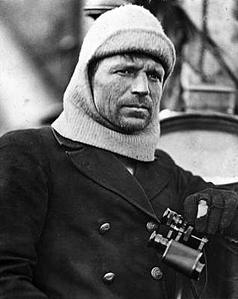
Frank Worsley

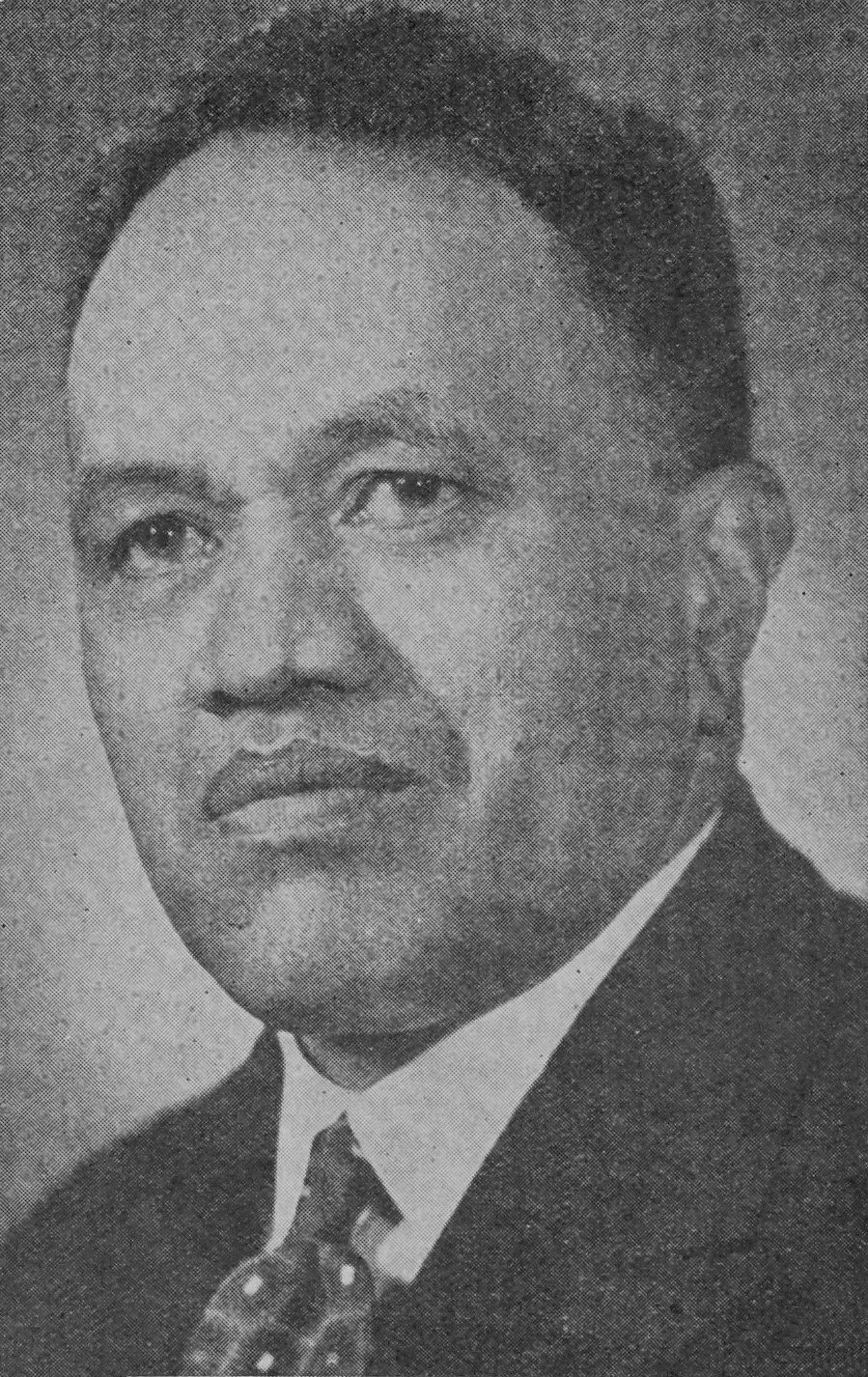
Paraire Karaka Paikea

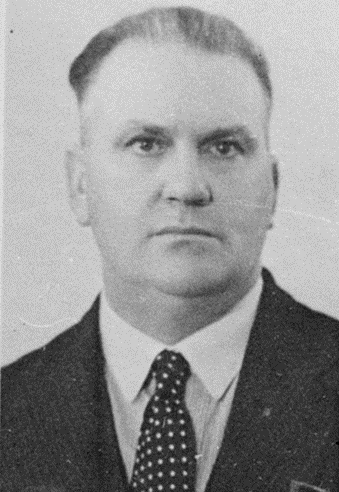
Arthur Cook

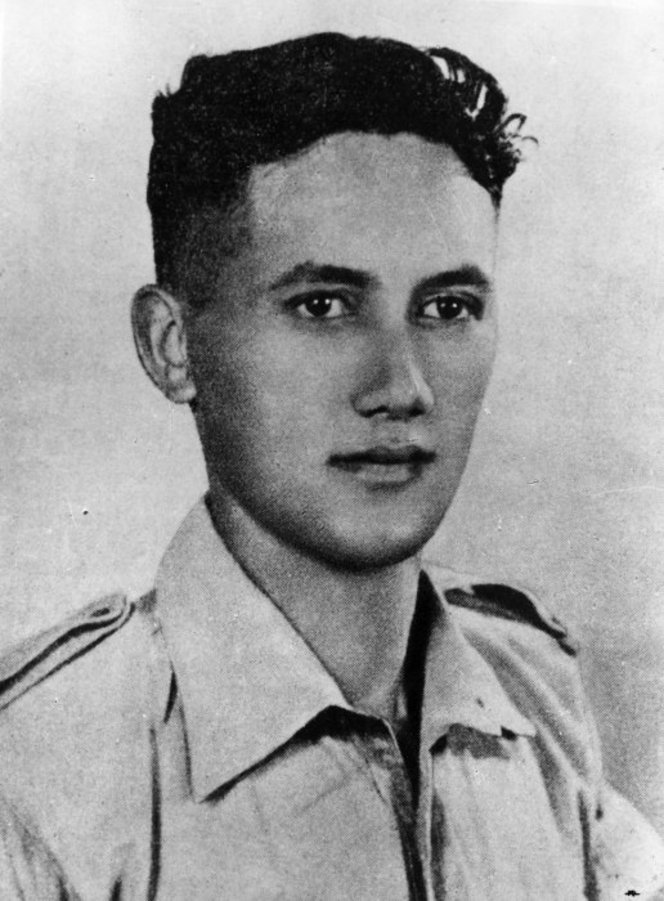
Moana-Nui-a-Kiwa Ngarimu

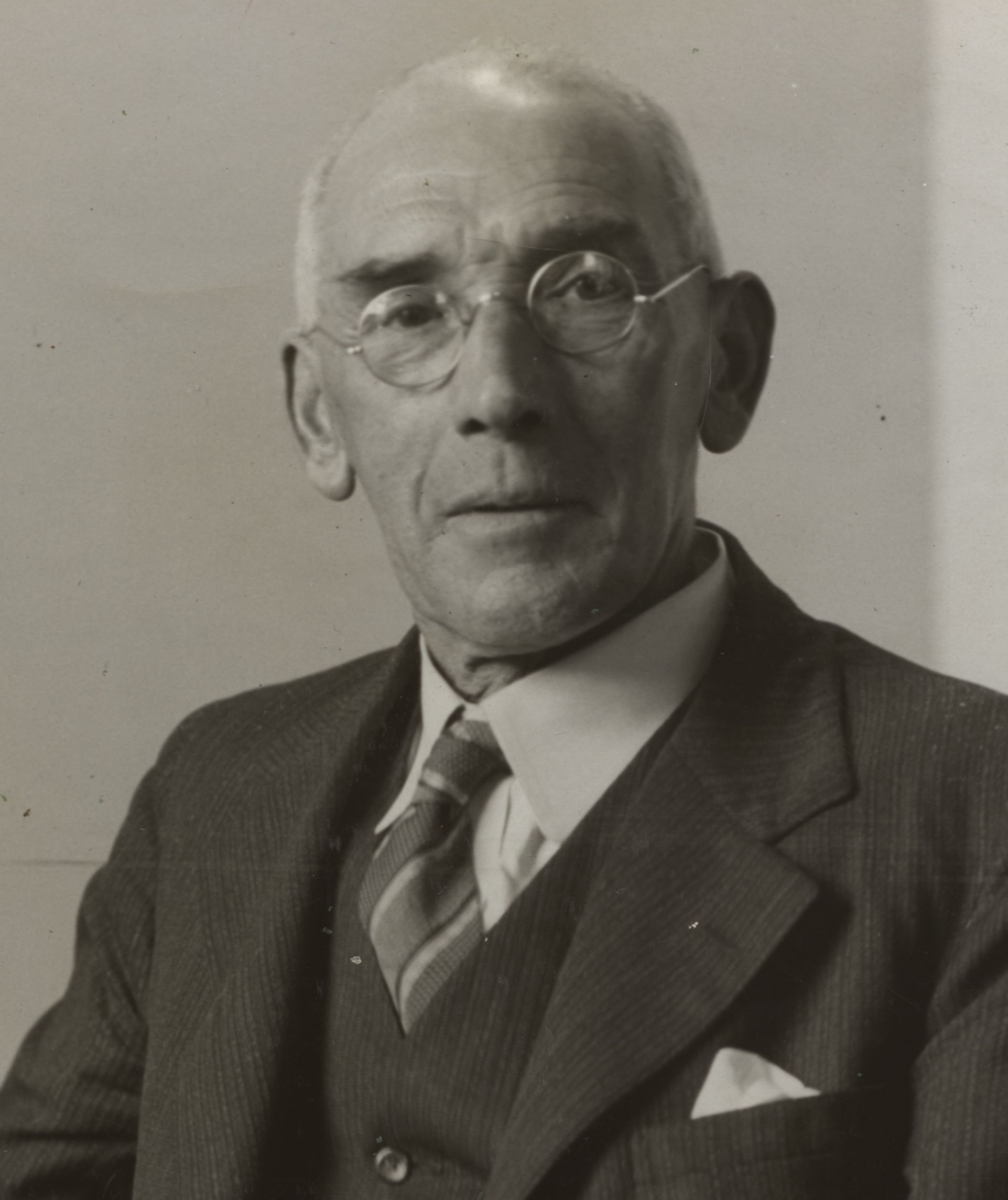
Alfred Ransom

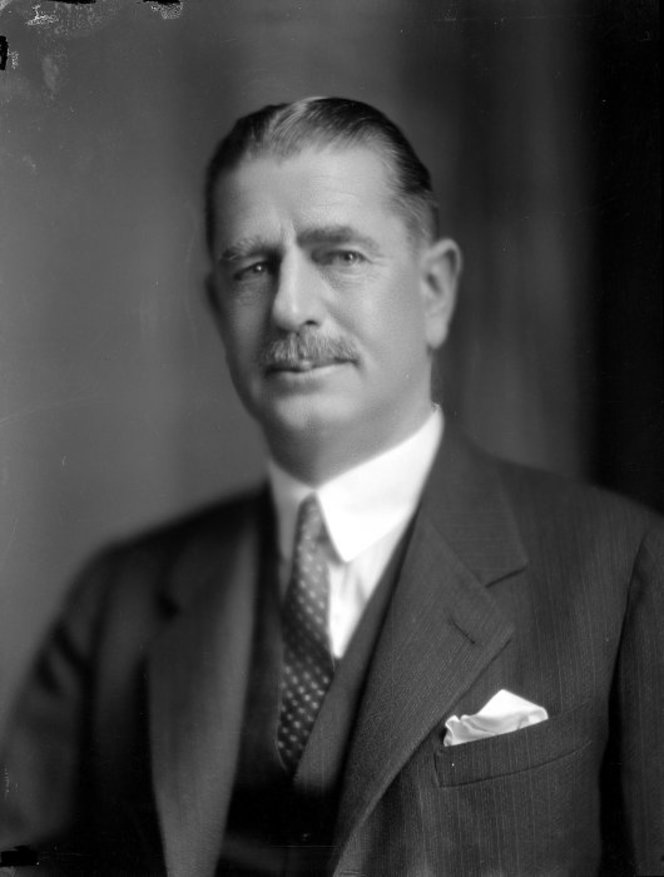
Gordon Coates

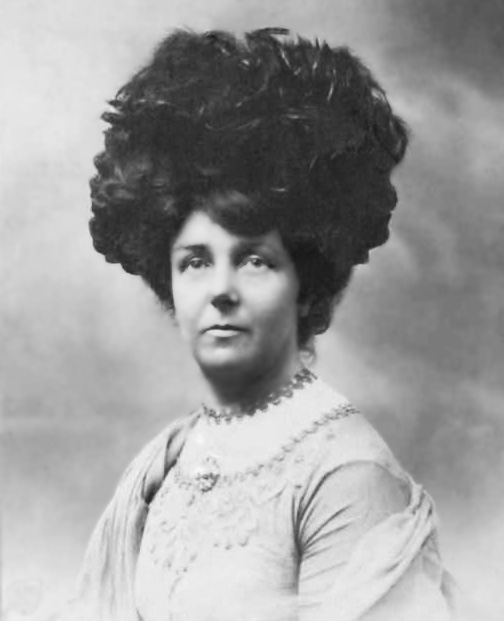
Hilda Hewlett

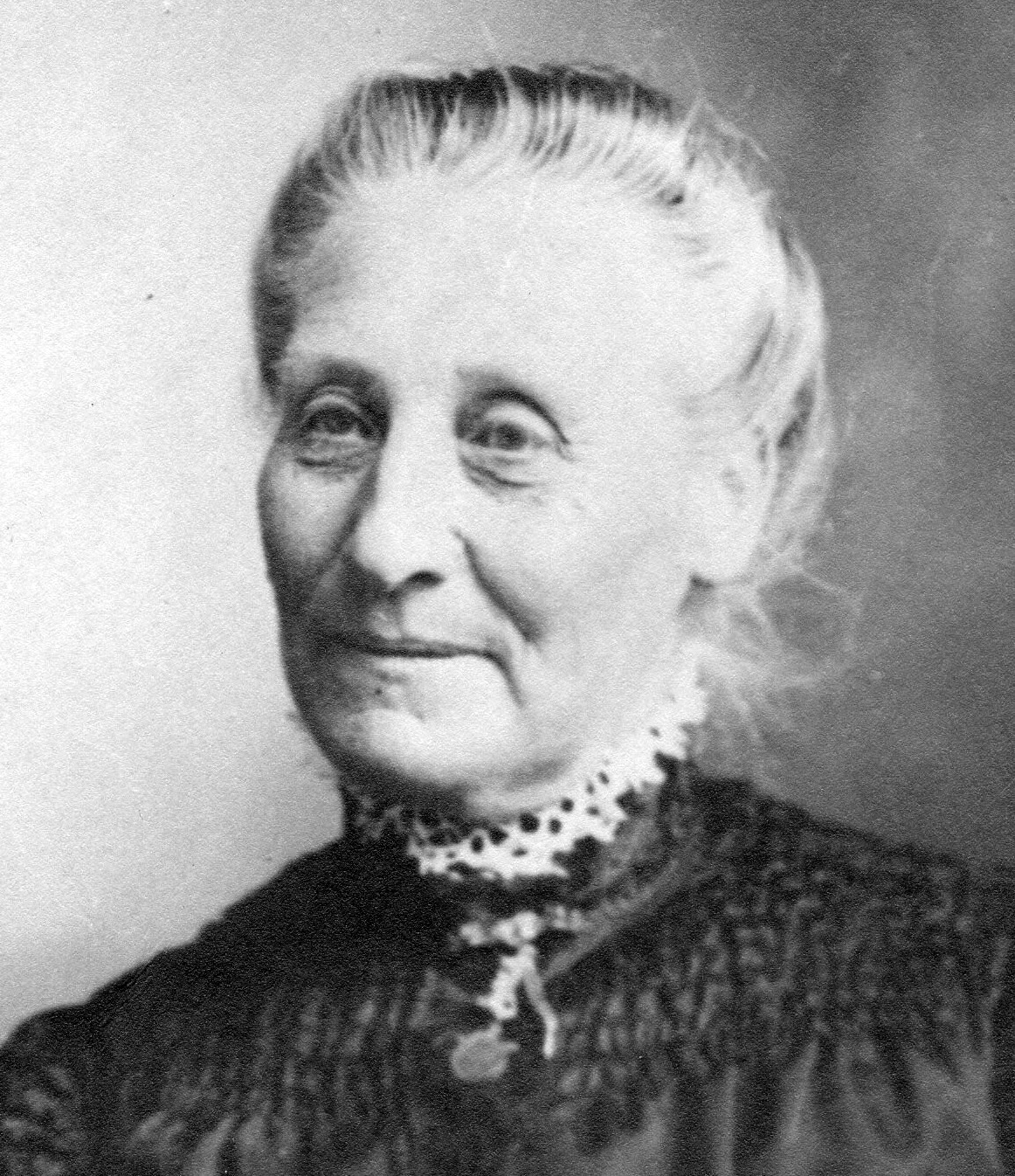
Sarah McMurray

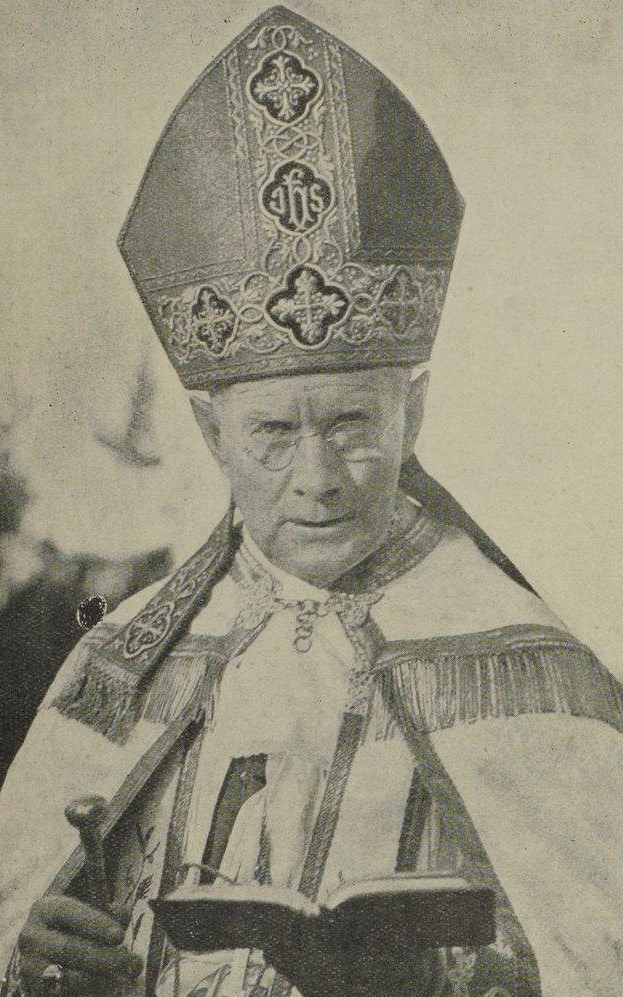
Matthew Brodie

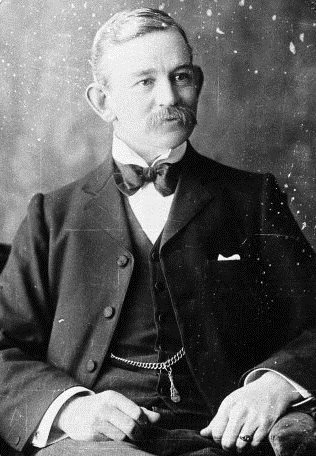
John Rigg

== See also ==
- History of New Zealand
- List of years in New Zealand
- Military history of New Zealand
- Timeline of New Zealand history
- Timeline of New Zealand's links with Antarctica
- Timeline of the New Zealand environment

For world events and topics in 1943 not specifically related to New Zealand see: 1943
