= 1942 in New Zealand =

- Decades: 1920s; 1930s; 1940s; 1950s; 1960s
- See also: History of New Zealand; List of years in New Zealand; Timeline of New Zealand history

The following lists events that happened during 1942 in New Zealand.

== Population ==
- Estimated population as of 31 December: 1,636,400.
- Increase since 31 December 1941: 5200 (0.32%).
- Males per 100 females: 94.2.

== Incumbents ==
=== Regal and viceregal ===
- Head of State – George VI
- Governor-General – Marshal of the Royal Air Force Sir Cyril Newall GCB OM GCMG CBE AM

=== Government ===
The life of the 26th New Zealand Parliament was extended for a further year (to 1942) due to World War II, with the Labour Party in government.

- Speaker of the House – Bill Barnard (Democratic Labour Party)
- Prime Minister – Peter Fraser
- Minister of Finance – Walter Nash
- Minister of Foreign Affairs – Frank Langstone then Peter Fraser
- Attorney-General – Rex Mason
- Chief Justice — Sir Michael Myers

=== Parliamentary opposition ===
- Leader of the Opposition – Sidney Holland (National Party).

=== Main centre leaders ===
- Mayor of Auckland – John Allum
- Mayor of Hamilton – Harold Caro
- Mayor of Wellington – Thomas Hislop
- Mayor of Christchurch – Ernest Andrews
- Mayor of Dunedin – Andrew Allen

== Events ==
=== January–March ===
- 8 March – Japanese Warrant Officer Nobuo Fujita of the Imperial Japanese Navy conducts aerial reconnaissance of Wellington. His Yokosuka E14y reconnaissance plane had been catapulted into the air from the Japanese submarine I-25 which stored the plane in a sealed foredeck hangar. After a successful daylight tour the submarine and plane headed north to make an inspection of Auckland on 13 March.

=== April–June ===
- 27 April – Rationing on sugar and women's stockings is introduced. The allowance per person is 12 ounces (340 g) of sugar per week, and one pair of women's stockings every three months.
- 24 May – I-21 briefly operated off northern New Zealand in May 1942. I-21's floatplane flown by Lt Ito Isuma conducted a reconnaissance flight over Thames and then Auckland on 24 May.
- 29 May – Rationing on clothing, footwear and linen is introduced, with an allowance of 52 coupons per year.
- 1 June – Tea rationing is introduced, with an allowance of 2 ounces (57 g) per person per week.
- 12 June First US Troop arrived 1942 at Waitematā Harbour in Auckland.
- 24 June – A severe earthquake, the 1942 Wairarapa earthquake struck the lower North Island, followed by a severe aftershock on 2 August. Considerable damage resulted in Masterton, other parts of the Wairarapa, Palmerston North and Wellington.

=== October–December ===
- 9 December – 37 of the 39 female patients in Ward 5 at Seacliff Lunatic Asylum (psychiatric hospital) are killed in a night-time fire – the country's worst fire disaster at that time.
- 13 December – Abel Tasman's first sighting of New Zealand 300 years earlier is commemorated in Hokitika (initially this was planned for Ōkārito but this was changed after it was cut off by flooding) by a Dutch delegation led by Charles van der Plas and hosted by the New Zealand government

=== Date unknown ===
- Japanese submarines operate in New Zealand waters in 1942 and 1943. They send reconnaissance aircraft over Auckland and Wellington, but do not carry out any attacks.

== Arts and literature ==
See 1942 in art, 1942 in literature

=== Music ===
See: 1942 in music

=== Radio ===
See: Public broadcasting in New Zealand

=== Film ===
See: Category:1942 film awards, 1942 in film, List of New Zealand feature films, Cinema of New Zealand, Category:1942 films

== Sport ==
Most sports events were on hold due to the war.

=== Horse racing ===
==== Harness racing ====
- New Zealand Trotting Cup: Haughty
- Auckland Trotting Cup: Loyal Friend

=== Rugby ===
Category:Rugby union in New Zealand, Category:All Blacks

- Ranfurly Shield

=== Rugby league ===
New Zealand national rugby league team

=== Soccer ===
- Chatham Cup competition not held
- Provincial league champions:
  - Auckland: Mount Albert Grammar School Old Boys
  - Canterbury: Western
  - Hawke's Bay: Napier HSOB
  - Nelson: No competition
  - Otago: Army
  - South Canterbury: No competition
  - Southland: No competition
  - Waikato: No competition
  - Wanganui: No competition
  - Wellington: Hospital

== Births ==
- 5 January: Trish McKelvey, cricketer.
- 12 January: Doug Graham, politician
- 23 January: Phil Clarke (rugby union), rugby union player
- 23 February: John Lewis, headmaster
- 16 March: Gordon Whiting, Judge, (died 2018)
- 24 March: Kerry Burke, politician.
- 21 April: Geoffrey Palmer, 33rd Prime Minister of New Zealand
- 19 June: Merata Mita, filmmaker (died 2010)
- 18 July: Mike Ward, politician
- 4 August: David Lange, 32nd Prime Minister of New Zealand (died 2005)
- 12 August: Howard Smalley, cricketer
- 23 September: Ann Hartley, politician (died 2024)
- 25 September: Peter Petherick, cricketer (died 2015)
- 25 November: Barbara Bevege, cricketer (died 1999)
  - Susan Wakefield, Tax expert (died 2022)
- Judith Potter, high court judge.
- Roger Walker. architect.

== Deaths ==
- 28 July: James Allen, politician and diplomat.
- 15 July: Denis 'Sonny' Moloney, cricketer.
- 17 July Robina Nicol, photographer and suffragist
- 27 August: Francis Mander, politician
- 12 October: Douglas Lysnar, politician.
- 8 November: Tim Armstrong, politician.

Category:1942 deaths

== See also ==
- List of years in New Zealand
- Timeline of New Zealand history
- History of New Zealand
- Military history of New Zealand
- Timeline of the New Zealand environment
- Timeline of New Zealand's links with Antarctica
