= 1944 in New Zealand =

- Decades: 1920s; 1930s; 1940s; 1950s; 1960s
- See also: History of New Zealand; List of years in New Zealand; Timeline of New Zealand history

The following lists events that happened during 1944 in New Zealand.

== Population ==
- Estimated population as of 31 December: 1,676,300.
- Increase since 31 December 1943: 34,300 (2.09%).
- Males per 100 females: 94.3.

== Incumbents ==
=== Regal and viceregal ===
- Head of State – George VI
- Governor-General – Marshal of the Royal Air Force Sir Cyril Newall GCB OM GCMG CBE AM

=== Government ===
The 27th New Zealand Parliament commenced, with the Labour Party in government.

- Speaker of the House – Bill Schramm (Labour)
- Prime Minister – Peter Fraser
- Minister of Finance – Walter Nash
- Minister of Foreign Affairs – Peter Fraser
- Attorney-General – Rex Mason
- Chief Justice – Sir Michael Myers

=== Parliamentary opposition ===
- Leader of the Opposition – Sidney Holland (National Party).

=== Main centre leaders ===
- Mayor of Auckland – John Allum
- Mayor of Hamilton – Harold Caro
- Mayor of Wellington – Thomas Hislop then Will Appleton
- Mayor of Christchurch – Ernest Andrews
- Mayor of Dunedin – Andrew Allen then Donald Cameron

== Events ==
- 21 January – New Zealand and Australia sign the Canberra Pact in which they agree to cooperate on international affairs.
- 15 March – New Zealand General Freyberg orders the destruction of the monastery at Cassino using 775 aircraft, 1250 tons of bombs, and 200,000 shells. At the end of the battle, New Zealand has lost 1050 men, one of the worst days in its history.
- March – Meat rationing is introduced, with an allowance of 1/9 to 2/- per person per week.
- October US Navy closes US Naval Base New Zealand
- 31 October – Refugees from Eastern Poland, 800 including 734 orphaned children, arrive in New Zealand via Siberia and Iran.
- The New Zealand head tax on Chinese immigrants from 1881 (63 years) is repealed.

== Arts and literature ==
See 1944 in art, 1944 in literature

=== Music ===
See: 1944 in music

=== Radio ===
See: Public broadcasting in New Zealand

=== Film ===
See: Category:1944 film awards, 1944 in film, List of New Zealand feature films, Cinema of New Zealand, Category:1944 films

== Sport ==
=== Archery ===
National champions (Postal Shoot)

- Open: W. Burton (Gisborne)
- Women: R. Mitchell (Dunedin)

=== Chess ===
- The 51st National Chess Championship was held in Wellington, and was won by R.G. Wade of Wellington.

=== Horse racing ===
==== Harness racing ====
- New Zealand Trotting Cup – Bronze Eagle
- Auckland Trotting Cup – Betty Boop

=== Lawn bowls ===
The national outdoor lawn bowls championships are held in Dunedin.

- Men's singles champion – M.J. Squire (Hawera Bowling Club)
- Men's pair champions – P.H. Edwards, E.W. Travers (skip) (St Kilda Bowling Club)
- Men's fours champions – W. Chapman, A.E. Seymour, J.A. Whyte, C.G. Spearman (skip) (Christchurch RSA Bowling Club)

=== Rugby union ===
- Ranfurly Shield: Held by Southland (uncontested due to World War II)

=== Rugby league ===
New Zealand national rugby league team

=== Soccer ===
- Chatham Cup competition not held
- Provincial league champions:
  - Auckland: Metro College
  - Canterbury: Thistle
  - Hawke's Bay: Napier HSOB
  - Nelson: No competition
  - Otago: Mosgiel
  - South Canterbury: No competition
  - Southland: No competition
  - Taranaki: Old Boys
  - Waikato: Rotowaro
  - Wanganui: No competition
  - Wellington: Waterside

== Births ==
- 4 January: Alan Sutherland, rugby player (died 2020)
- 7 February: Witi Ihimaera, author
- 4 March: Brian Turner, sportsman and writer
- 6 March: Kiri Te Kanawa, opera singer
- 8 April: Tariana Turia, politician (died 2025)
- 12 May: Barry Barclay, filmmaker (died 2008)
- 16 June: Robin Morrison, photographer (died 1993)
- 17 July: Mark Burgess, cricketer
- 22 July: Anand Satyanand, Judge, ombudsman and 19th Governor-General of New Zealand
- 29 July: Terrence Jarvis, cricketer
- 17 August: Philip Woollaston, politician
- 26 August: Neroli Fairhall, archer (died 2006)
- 30 August: Alex Wyllie, rugby union player and coach
- 7 October: Jack Body, composer (died 2015)
- 10 November: Andy Leslie, rugby union player and administrator
- 18 November: David O'Sullivan, cricketer
- 28 November: Joanna Orwin, writer
- Noel Anderson, Judge (died 2021)
- Philip Culbertson, theologian
- Keith Locke, environmentalist and politician
- John Wood, diplomat
- J. S. Parker, painter (died 2017)

== Deaths ==
- 18 June Arthur Bignell, businessman, mayor.
- 21 July: John Andrew MacPherson, politician.
- 12 August: James Hargest, National MP, killed while serving with NZ Army as observer with British forces in Normandy.
- 30 August: Thomas William Rhodes, politician.
- 30 October: Haami Tokouru Ratana, politician and Ratana church leader.
- 2 December: Frank Milner, headmaster and educationalist.
- 29 December: John Cobbe, politician.
- 29 December: Henry Holland, mayor of Christchurch.

== See also ==
- History of New Zealand
- List of years in New Zealand
- Military history of New Zealand
- Timeline of New Zealand history
- Timeline of New Zealand's links with Antarctica
- Timeline of the New Zealand environment
