= 1941 in New Zealand =

- Decades: 1920s; 1930s; 1940s; 1950s; 1960s
- See also: History of New Zealand; List of years in New Zealand; Timeline of New Zealand history

The following lists events that happened during 1941 in New Zealand.

== Population ==
- Estimated population as of 31 December: 1,631,200.
- Increase since 31 December 1940: -2400 (-0.15%).
- Males per 100 females: 96.1.
- The scheduled New Zealand census was not held due to World War II.

== Incumbents ==
=== Regal and viceregal ===
- Head of State - George VI
- Governor-General - The Viscount Galway GCMG DSO OBE PC, succeeded same year by Marshal of the Royal Air Force Sir Cyril Newall GCB OM GCMG CBE AM

=== Government ===
The 26th New Zealand Parliament continued with the Labour Party in government. 1941 should have been an election year, but because of World War II the election was deferred until 1942.

- Speaker of the House - Bill Barnard (Democratic Labour Party)
- Prime Minister - Peter Fraser
- Minister of Finance - Walter Nash
- Minister of Foreign Affairs - Frank Langstone
- Attorney-General - Rex Mason
- Chief Justice — Sir Michael Myers

=== Parliamentary opposition ===
- Leader of the Opposition - Sidney Holland (National Party).

=== Main centre leaders ===
- Mayor of Auckland - Ernest Davis then John Allum
- Mayor of Hamilton - Harold Caro
- Mayor of Wellington - Thomas Hislop
- Mayor of Christchurch - Robert M. Macfarlane then Ernest Andrews
- Mayor of Dunedin - Andrew Allen

== Events ==
- 16 January: formation of the New Zealand Women's Auxiliary Air Force
- March: 2NZEF deployed to northern Greece and were soon involved in the Battle of Greece.
- 24–30 April: New Zealand forces evacuated from mainland Greece to Crete.
- 14 May: The minesweeper HMNZS Puriri was sunk by a mine while sweeping in the Hauraki Gulf, and sank with the death of five of her crew.
- 20 May - 1 June: Battle of Crete - New Zealand forces suffer heavy losses: 671 dead, 967 wounded, 2,180 captured. On the first day of the German invasion, Charles Upham wins the V.C
- 8 October: four police officers and three civilians are shot and killed at Kowhitirangi, near Hokitika, by Stanley Graham
- 7 December: Hawaii bombed in a surprise attack by Japanese carrier forces on the US Navy.
- 8 December: New Zealand declares war on Japan in response to Japanese attack on the United States.
- 10 December: British battlecruiser HMS Repulse and battleship HMS Prince of Wales sunk by Japanese torpedo planes, effectively taking Britain out of the sea war in the Pacific.
- 15 December: A RNZAF Lockheed Hudson bomber returning to Nelson from a coastal patrol hit the top of a limestone bluff near Collingwood in thick fog, killing all four crew.
- 19 December: New Zealand suffers its worst naval loss when 150 New Zealanders on board HMS Neptune are killed after the ship strikes mines and sinks off the coast of Libya.
- German surface raiders operated in New Zealand waters in 1940 and 1941, sinking four ships.

== Arts and literature ==
See 1941 in art, 1941 in literature

=== Music ===
See: 1941 in music

=== Radio ===
See: Public broadcasting in New Zealand

=== Film ===
See: Category:1941 film awards, 1941 in film, List of New Zealand feature films, Cinema of New Zealand, Category:1941 films

== Sport ==
Most sporting events were on hold due to the war.

=== Chess ===
- The 50th National Chess Championship was held in Timaru, and was won by P. Allerhand of Wellington.

=== Horse racing ===
==== Harness racing ====
- New Zealand Trotting Cup – Josedale Grattan
- Auckland Trotting Cup – Uenuku

=== Lawn bowls ===
The national outdoor lawn bowls championships are held in Christchurch.

- Men's singles champion – C. Spearman (Christchurch RSA Bowling Club)
- Men's pair champions – H.S. Maslin, M.J. Squire (skip) (Hawera Bowling Club)
- Men's fours champions – C.H. Elsom, D.H. Joseph, A. Williamson, P. Munn (skip) (Canterbury Bowling Club)

=== Rugby union ===
Category:Rugby union in New Zealand, Category:All Blacks

- Ranfurly Shield

=== Rugby league ===
New Zealand national rugby league team

=== Soccer ===
- Chatham Cup competition not held
- Provincial league champions:
  - Auckland: Comrade
  - Canterbury: Western
  - Hawke's Bay: Napier HSOB
  - Nelson: No competition
  - Otago: Mosgiel
  - South Canterbury: No competition
  - Southland: No competition
  - Waikato: No competition
  - Wanganui: No competition
  - Wellington: Seatoun

== Births ==
- 5 January: Bob Cunis, cricketer (died 2008).
- 3 February: Gary Bartlett, cricketer.
- 11 February: Alan "A. K." Grant, writer, humourist. (died 2000)
- 12 February: Ross Morgan, cricketer.
- 12 February: Bruno Lawrence, actor. (died 1995)
- 26 February: Keith Thomson, cricketer.
- 8 April: Roderick Deane, economist, public sector reformer, and businessman.
- 7 May: Grahame Bilby, cricketer.
- 17 June: Claire Stewart, politician. (died 2020)
- 5 July: Lynley Dodd, children's author.
- 20 July: Pita Sharples, academic and politician.
- 17 August: Owen Marshall, writer (Owen Marshall Jones).
- 22 August: Tumu Te Heuheu Tūkino VIII, Maori tribal leader (died 2025)
- 12 September: Doug Kidd, politician.
- 17 September: Tilly Hirst, netball player (died 2021).
- 29 October: Bryan Yuile, cricketer.
- 7 November: Jim Sutton, politician.
- 10 November: Gary Day, actor.
- 12 November: Jenny McLeod, composer and musician.
- 24 November: Bob Harvey, mayor of Waitakere City.
- Chin Wing Ho (Peter Chin), mayor of Dunedin.
- Malcolm Douglas, politician.
- Allan Hawkey, cartoonist.
- (in England): Bernard Holman, artist. (died 1988)
- Ian Mune, actor and director.
- Ian Peters, politician.
- Alan Reay, structural engineer.

Category:1941 births

== Deaths ==
- 2 May: Sir James Parr, politician.
- 26 May: William John Lyon, Labour MP, killed serving with 2NZEF on Crete.
- 27 April:Elizabeth Taylor, community leader.
- 27 July: Alfred Henry O'Keeffe, painter.
- 11 September: Albert Glover, politician.
- 4 October: George Troup, architect.
- 20 October: Stanley Graham, murderer (shot by police).
- 1 November: Gordon Hultquist, Labour MP, killed serving with 2NZEF in North Africa.
- 28 November: John Manchester Allen, National MP, killed serving with 2NZEF in Libya.
- 29 November: Arthur Nattle Grigg, National MP, killed serving with 2NZEF in Libya.
- 30 November: Thomas David Burnett, National MP.
- James Alexander Pond, analytical chemist and homeopathic pharmacist.

== See also ==
- List of years in New Zealand
- Timeline of New Zealand history
- History of New Zealand
- Military history of New Zealand
- Timeline of the New Zealand environment
- Timeline of New Zealand's links with Antarctica
