= 1946 in New Zealand =

- Decades: 1920s; 1930s; 1940s; 1950s; 1960s
- See also: History of New Zealand; List of years in New Zealand; Timeline of New Zealand history

The following lists events that happened during 1946 in New Zealand.

== Population ==
- Estimated population as of 31 December: 1,781,200.
- Increase since 31 December 1945: 53,400 (3.09%).
- Males per 100 females: 100.2.

== Incumbents ==
=== Regal and viceregal ===
- Head of State – George VI
- Governor-General – Marshal of the Royal Air Force Sir Cyril Newall GCB OM GCMG CBE AM, succeeded same year by Lieutenant-General The Lord Freyberg VC GCMG KCB KBE DSO

=== Government ===
The 27th New Zealand Parliament concluded, with the Labour Party in government. Labour was re-elected for a fourth term in the election in November, but with a smaller majority.

- Speaker of the House – Bill Schramm (Labour)
- Prime Minister – Peter Fraser
- Minister of Finance – Walter Nash
- Minister of Foreign Affairs – Peter Fraser
- Attorney-General – Rex Mason
- Chief Justice – Sir Michael Myers (until 7 August), Sir Humphrey O'Leary (starting 12 August)

=== Parliamentary opposition ===
- Leader of the Opposition – Sidney Holland (National Party).

=== Main centre leaders ===
- Mayor of Auckland – John Allum
- Mayor of Hamilton – Harold Caro
- Mayor of Wellington – Will Appleton
- Mayor of Christchurch – Ernest Andrews
- Mayor of Dunedin – Donald Cameron

== Events ==
- Family benefit of £1 per week becomes universal.
- Bank of New Zealand nationalised.

== Arts and literature ==
See 1946 in art, 1946 in literature

=== Music ===
See: 1946 in music

=== Radio ===
See: Public broadcasting in New Zealand

=== Film ===
See: Category:1946 film awards, 1946 in film, List of New Zealand feature films, Cinema of New Zealand, Category:1946 films

== Sport ==
=== Archery ===
National champions (Postal Shoot)

- Open: W. Burton (Gisborne)
- Women: P. Bryan (Auckland)

=== Athletics ===
- Lionel Fox wins his second national title in the men's marathon, clocking 2:40:00 in Wanganui.

=== Basketball ===
National Associations are formed for both men and women (now combined as Basketball New Zealand) and the first championship for men under the control of their association is held. (see 1938 and 1939)

- Interprovincial champions: Men – (tie) Auckland, Wellington, Otago

=== Chess ===
- The 53rd National Chess Championship was held in Christchurch, and was won by T. Lepviikman of Wellington.

=== Horse racing ===
==== Harness racing ====
- New Zealand Trotting Cup – Integrity
- Auckland Trotting Cup – Loyal Nurse

=== Lawn bowls ===
The national outdoor lawn bowls championships are held in Christchurch.

- Men's singles champion – J.S. Martin (Edgeware Bowling Club)
- Men's pair champions – G.C. Batchelor, S.C.K. Smith (skip) (North End Bowling Club, Invercargill)
- Men's fours champions – W. Hillhouse, J. Gourley, J. Armstrong, F. White (skip) (Runanga Bowling Club)

=== Rugby union ===
Category:Rugby union in New Zealand, Category:All Blacks

- Ranfurly Shield

=== Rugby league ===
New Zealand national rugby league team

=== Soccer ===
- 14 September: A New Zealand team played a single game against Wellington, which they won 5–2
- The Chatham Cup is won by Wellington Marist who beat Technical Old Boys of Christchurch 2–1 in the final.
- Provincial league champions:
  - Auckland: Metro College
  - Canterbury: Western
  - Hawke's Bay: Napier Rovers
  - Nelson:
  - Otago: Mosgiel
  - South Canterbury: Fisherman
  - Southland: Invercargill Thistle
  - Taranaki: Albion
  - Waikato: Rotowaro
  - Wanganui: Technical College Old Boys
  - Wellington: Wellington Marist

== Births ==
- 19 February: Frank Gibson, Jr., jazz drummer (died 2025).
- 25 February: Grahame Thorne, rugby player, commentator and politician.
- 28 February: Graham Vivian, cricketer.
- 2 April: Richard Collinge, cricketer.
- 15 May: George Hawkins, politician.
- 24 May: Ian Kirkpatrick, rugby player.
- 5 June (in Wales): John Bach, actor.
- 17 May: Bill Wilson, Supreme Court judge (died 2025)
- 8 June: Graham Henry, rugby coach.
- 27 June: Bruce Cribb, motorcycle speedway rider.
- 4 July: Sam Hunt, performance poet.
- 22 July: Christine McElwee, politician, historian, non-fiction author and teacher (died 2022).
- 4 August: Paul East, politician.
- 1 September: Keith Quinn, broadcaster.
- 14 September: John Luxton, politician.
- 29 September: Neil Cherry, environmental scientist (died 2003).
- 17 October: Ian Wedde, writer.
- 30 November: Ken Wadsworth, cricketer (died 1976).
- 2 December:
  - John Banks, politician, radio host.
  - Doug Cowie, cricket umpire.
- 11 December: Stewart Murray Wilson, sex offender (died 2021).
- 24 December: Graham Bell, police officer and television personality (died 2025).
- 27 December: Bill Manhire, poet.
- date unknown
  - Richard Killeen, artist.

== Deaths ==
- 9 February Vincent Ward, politician.
- 5 March: Sir Charles Statham, politician.
- 26 September: William Nosworthy, politician.
- 10 November: Claude Weston, politician.

== See also ==
- List of years in New Zealand
- Timeline of New Zealand history
- History of New Zealand
- Military history of New Zealand
- Timeline of the New Zealand environment
- Timeline of New Zealand's links with Antarctica
