= 1940 in New Zealand =

- Decades: 1920s; 1930s; 1940s; 1950s; 1960s
- See also: History of New Zealand; List of years in New Zealand; Timeline of New Zealand history

The following lists events that happened during 1940 in New Zealand.

== Population ==
- Estimated population as of 31 December: 1,633,600.
- Increase since 31 December 1939: -8000 (−0.49%).
- Males per 100 females: 99.1.

== Incumbents ==
=== Regal and viceregal ===
- Head of State – George VI
- Governor-General – The Viscount Galway GCMG DSO OBE PC

=== Government ===
The 26th New Zealand Parliament continued with the Labour Party in government.

- Speaker of the House – Bill Barnard (Labour Party)
- Prime Minister – Michael Joseph Savage then Peter Fraser
- Minister of Finance – Walter Nash
- Minister of Foreign Affairs – Michael Joseph Savage then Frank Langstone
- Attorney-General – Rex Mason
- Chief Justice – Sir Michael Myers

=== Parliamentary opposition ===
- Leader of the Opposition – Adam Hamilton (National Party) until 26 November, then Sidney Holland (National).

=== Main centre leaders ===
- Mayor of Auckland – Ernest Davis
- Mayor of Hamilton – Harold David Caro
- Mayor of Wellington – Thomas Hislop
- Mayor of Christchurch – Robert M. Macfarlane
- Mayor of Dunedin – Andrew Henson Allen

== Events ==
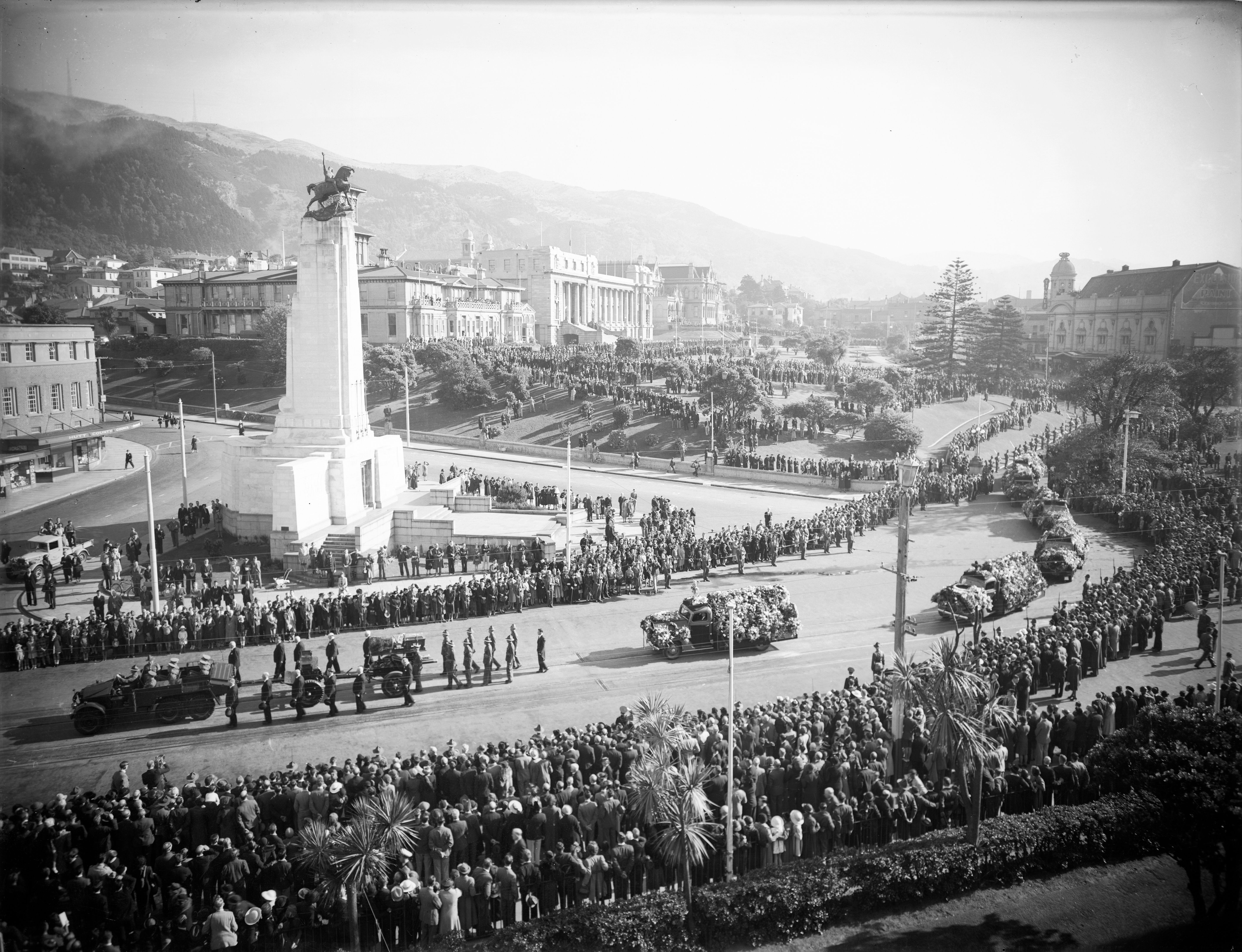
The state funeral procession for Michael Joseph Savage, April 1940

- 25 March: John A. Lee is expelled from the governing Labour caucus following his outspoken criticism of dying leader Michael Joseph Savage
- 27 March: New Zealand's first Labour Prime Minister, Michael Joseph Savage dies from cancer in Wellington.
- 19 June: The liner RMS Niagara is sunk by a mine laid by the German auxiliary cruiser Orion off Whangarei. She was carrying British gold destined for America.
- 12 July: Pan American Airways flying boat service from Hawaii to Auckland via Canton Island (not Kingman Reef) commences.
- 14 December: The Canterbury Pioneer Women's Memorial was formally opened.
- German surface raiders operated in New Zealand waters in 1940 and 1941, sinking four ships.

== Arts and literature ==
See 1940 in art, 1940 in literature

=== Music ===
See: 1940 in music

=== Radio ===
See: Public broadcasting in New Zealand

=== Film ===
- Rewi's Last Stand (1940)
- One Hundred Crowded Years

See: Category:1940 film awards, 1940 in film, List of New Zealand feature films, Cinema of New Zealand, Category:1940 films

== Sport ==
=== Chess ===
- The 49th National Chess Championship was held in Wellington, and was won by John Dunlop of Dunedin (his 6th and last title).

=== Horse racing ===
==== Harness racing ====
- New Zealand Trotting Cup – Marlene
- Auckland Trotting Cup – Ned Worthy

=== Lawn bowls ===
The national outdoor lawn bowls championships are held in Wellington.

- Men's singles champion – G.A. Deare (Carlton Bowling Club)
- Men's pair champions – L.G. Donaldson, Bill Bremner (skip) (West End Bowling Club, Auckland)
- Men's fours champions – Bill Whittaker, J.W.T. Macklow, Alec Robertson, Frank Livingstone (skip) (Onehunga Bowling Club)

=== Soccer ===
- The Chatham Cup is won by Waterside who beat Mosgiel 6–2 in the final.
- Provincial league champions:
  - Auckland: Comrade
  - Canterbury: Western
  - Hawke's Bay: Napier HSOB
  - Nelson: No competition
  - Otago: Mosgiel
  - South Canterbury: No competition
  - Southland: No competition
  - Taranaki: RNZAF
  - Waikato: No competition
  - Wanganui: Technical College Old Boys
  - Wellington: Waterside

== Births ==
- 12 January: Dick Motz, cricketer (d. 2007)
- 13 February: Stan Rodger, politician (d. 2022)
- 17 February: James Laurenson, actor (d. 2024)
- 23 March: Brian Hastings, cricketer (d. 2024)
- 14 April: Robin Tait, discus thrower (d. 1984)
- 7 June: Felicity Riddy, author and academic
- 9 June: Philip Trusttum, artist (d. 2026)
- 10 June (in the USA): Augie Auer, meteorologist (d. 2007)
- 23 June: Mike Shrimpton, cricketer (d. 2015)
- 1 July (in Australia): Judith Binney, historian (d. 2011)
- 8 July: Waka Nathan, rugby union player (d. 2021)
- 15 July: Ian Athfield, architect (d. 2015)
- 3 August: David Baragwanath, High Court judge.
- 11 August: Glenys Page, cricketer (d. 2012)
- 31 August: Maurice (John) Belgrave, public servant and chief ombudsman (d. 2007)
- 3 September: Brian Lochore, rugby player (d. 2019)
- 18 September
  - Bruce Murray cricketer
  - Jon Trimmer, ballet dancer.
- 24 September: Don Brash, Governor of the Reserve Bank of New Zealand, politician
- 6 October: Merv Wellington, politician (d. 2003)
- 24 October: Martin Campbell, film and TV director
- date unknown
  - Robyn Donald, writer.
  - Tessa Duder, writer.
  - Joe Hawke, politician.
- Michael Jackson, poet, anthropologist
  - Maurice McTigue, politician and diplomat.

== Deaths ==
- 12 January: Taurekareka Henare, politician.
- 27 March: Michael Joseph Savage, Prime Minister.
- 28 May: Florence Young, missionary.
- 6 June: F.O. Edgar "Cobber" Kain, first RAF ace of WWII.
- 17 November: Frank Moore, political activist.
- Hannah Retter, New Zealand centenarian (born 1839)

== See also ==
- History of New Zealand
- List of years in New Zealand
- Military history of New Zealand
- Timeline of New Zealand history
- Timeline of New Zealand's links with Antarctica
- Timeline of the New Zealand environment

For world events and topics in 1940 not specifically related to New Zealand see: 1940
