= 1939 in New Zealand =

- Decades: 1910s; 1920s; 1930s; 1940s; 1950s
- See also: History of New Zealand; List of years in New Zealand; Timeline of New Zealand history

The following lists events that happened during 1939 in New Zealand.

== Population ==
- Estimated population as of 31 December: 1,641,600.
- Increase since 31 December 1938: 23,300 (1.44%).
- Males per 100 females: 103.0.

== Incumbents ==
=== Regal and viceregal ===
- Head of state – George VI
- Governor-General – The Viscount Galway GCMG DSO OBE PC

=== Government ===
The 26th New Zealand Parliament continued with the Labour Party in government.

- Speaker of the House – Bill Barnard (Labour Party)
- Prime Minister – Michael Joseph Savage
- Minister of Finance – Walter Nash
- Minister of Foreign Affairs – Michael Joseph Savage
- Attorney-General – Rex Mason
- Chief Justice – Sir Michael Myers

=== Parliamentary opposition ===
- Leader of the Opposition – Adam Hamilton (National Party).

=== Main centre leaders ===
- Mayor of Auckland – Ernest Davis
- Mayor of Wellington – Thomas Hislop
- Mayor of Christchurch – Robert Macfarlane
- Mayor of Dunedin – Andrew Henson Allen

== Events ==
- 29 January: (Sunday) Opening of St Peter's College, Auckland by Bishop J M Liston.
- 20 March: William Snodgrass, a New Zealand politician, disappeared from the interisland ferry Arahura while travelling overnight from Wellington to Nelson.
- 3 September (backdated to 9.30 pm): New Zealand declares war on Germany at the same time as Britain (though delayed until confirmation by the Admiralty message to the fleet).
- 31 October: The Strongman coal mine in Nine Mile Valley near Greymouth is officially opened by Minister of Mines, Paddy Webb.
- 8 November: New Zealand Centennial Exhibition opened in Kilbirnie, Wellington
- 13 December: New Zealand warship HMS Achilles fought in the Battle of the River Plate against German pocket battleship Admiral Graf Spee.
- 17 December: The Graf Spee is scuttled off Montevideo harbour.
- The Poverty Bay Herald changes its name to The Gisborne Herald, which continues to publish today.

== Arts and literature ==
See 1939 in art, 1939 in literature

=== Music ===
See: 1939 in music

=== Radio ===
See: Public broadcasting in New Zealand

=== Film ===
See: Category:1939 film awards, 1939 in film, List of New Zealand feature films, Cinema of New Zealand, Category:1939 films

== Sport ==
=== Athletics ===
- Clarrie Gibbons wins the national title in the men's marathon, clocking 2:44:56.2 on 11 March 1939 in Napier.

=== Basketball ===
A second interprovincial championship is held even though there is still no national association. (see 1938 and 1946)

- Interpovincial Champions: Men – Wellington

=== Chess ===
- The 48th National Chess Championship was held in Wanganui, and was won by John Dunlop of Dunedin (his 5th title).

=== Horse racing ===
==== Harness racing ====
- New Zealand Trotting Cup – Lucky Jack (2nd win)
- Auckland Trotting Cup – Marlene

=== Lawn bowls ===
The national outdoor lawn bowls championships are held in Auckland.

- Men's singles champion – W.C. Franks (Balmoral Bowling Club)
- Men's pair champions – J. Anchor, W.J. Robinson (skip) (Hamilton Bowling Club)
- Men's fours champions – C.F. Robertson, H. Franks, J.F. Benson, W.C. Franks (skip) (Balmoral Bowling Club)

=== Rugby union ===
Category:Rugby union in New Zealand, Category:All Blacks

- Ranfurly Shield

=== Rugby league ===
New Zealand national rugby league team

=== Shooting ===
- Ballinger Belt – William Masefield (Blenheim)

=== Soccer ===
- The Chatham Cup is won by Waterside of Wellington who beat Western of Christchurch 4–2 in the final.
- Provincial league champions:
  - Auckland: Ponsonby AFC
  - Canterbury: Western
  - Hawke's Bay: Napier Utd
  - Nelson: YMCA
  - Otago: Mosgiel
  - South Canterbury: Old Boys
  - Southland: Mataura
  - Waikato: Rotowaro
  - Wanganui: Wanganui Athletic
  - Wellington: Petone Football Club

== Births ==
- 20 January: Ken Comber, politician. (died 1998)
- 27 February: Don McKinnon, deputy Prime Minister of New Zealand and Commonwealth Secretary-General.
- 10 April: Margaret Bedggood, legal scholar and chief human rights commissioner. (died 2026)
- 24 April: Fergie McCormick, rugby union player. (died 2018)
- 19 June: John Terris, politician, priest and broadcaster. (died 2026)
- 16 September: Tony Davies, rugby union player. (died 2008)
- 23 September
  - Hugh Williams, High Court judge.
  - Pauline Stansfield, disability advocate. (died 2022)
- 25 September: David Walter, mayor of Stratford. (died 2020)
- 4 October: Ivan Mauger, motorcycle speedway champion. (died 2018)
- 29 October: Michael Smither, painter.
- 18 October: Peter Brown, politician.
- 24 November: Bob Jones, businessman (died 2025)
- 27 December: Hugo Judd, diplomat and public servant (died 2017)
- Raymond Ching, painter.
- Philip Temple, writer.

== Deaths ==
- 16 March: George Mitchell, soldier and politician.
- 25 March: Annie Cleland Millar, businesswoman.
- 26 April: Ted Howard, politician.
- 26 July: Thomas William "Torpedo Billy" Murphy, boxer.
- 17 July: Paddy the Wanderer, a dog in Wellington.
- 27 July: Malcolm Champion, swimmer.
- 23 August: Robin Hyde, writer.
- 18 September: T. W. Ratana, prophet.
- 3 November: David McLaren, politician.

== See also ==
- History of New Zealand
- List of years in New Zealand
- Military history of New Zealand
- Timeline of New Zealand history
- Timeline of New Zealand's links with Antarctica
- Timeline of the New Zealand environment
