= 1945 in New Zealand =

- Decades: 1920s; 1930s; 1940s; 1950s; 1960s
- See also: History of New Zealand; List of years in New Zealand; Timeline of New Zealand history

The following lists events that happened during 1945 in New Zealand.

== Population ==
A census was held on 25 September 1945. This was a year earlier than the established pattern, to make up for the lack of a census in 1941 due to World War II, and so that an electoral redistribution (the first for ten years) could be done before the 1946 election.

	Male	Female	Total
Usually resident population	830,385 (48.9%)	868,614 (51.1%)	1,698,996
Overseas Visitors	2,451	768	3,222
Total	832,908	869,421	1,702,329

- Estimated population as of 31 December: 1,727,800
- Increase since previous 31 December 1944: 51,500 (3.07%)
- Males per 100 females: 98.1
- Large increase is due to demobilisation of New Zealanders from military service overseas.

== Incumbents ==
=== Regal and viceregal ===
- Head of State – George VI
- Governor-General – Marshal of the Royal Air Force Sir Cyril Newall GCB OM GCMG CBE AM

=== Government ===
The 27th New Zealand Parliament continued, with the Labour Party in government.

- Speaker of the House – Bill Schramm (Labour)
- Prime Minister – Peter Fraser
- Minister of Finance – Walter Nash
- Minister of Foreign Affairs – Peter Fraser
- Attorney-General – Rex Mason
- Chief Justice – Sir Michael Myers

=== Parliamentary opposition ===
- Leader of the Opposition – Sidney Holland (National Party).

=== Main centre leaders ===
- Mayor of Auckland – John Allum
- Mayor of Hamilton – Harold Caro
- Mayor of Wellington – Will Appleton
- Mayor of Christchurch – Ernest Andrews
- Mayor of Dunedin – Donald Cameron

== Events ==
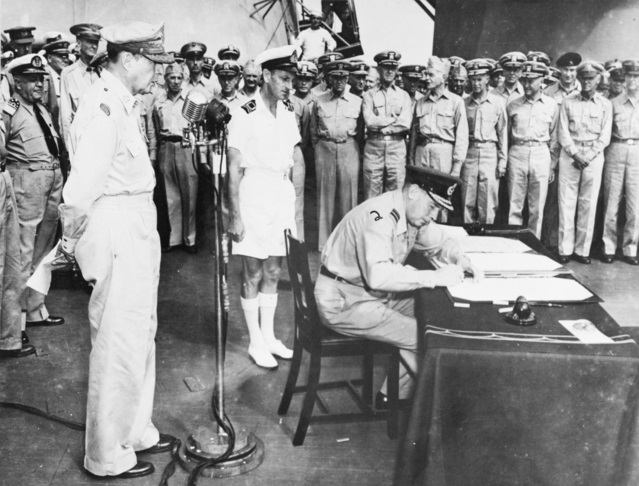
1945; Air Vice Marshal Leonard M. Isitt, representing New Zealand, accepts the Japanese surrender

- 2 May: New Zealand 2nd Division accepts surrender of the German Army in Trieste.
- 22 November: A storm causes the partial collapse of the Onekaka Wharf, causing the wharf to be abandoned.
- 15 December: Main North Line railway linking Christchurch and Picton is completed and officially opened over seventy years after construction began.
- Saturday and Sunday trading by most retail outlets, apart from dairies and takeaway food outlets, is banned.

== Arts and literature ==
See 1945 in art, 1945 in literature

=== Music ===
See: 1945 in music

=== Radio ===
See: Public broadcasting in New Zealand

=== Film ===
See: Category:1945 film awards, 1945 in film, List of New Zealand feature films, Cinema of New Zealand, Category:1945 films

== Sport ==
=== Archery ===
National champions (Postal Shoot)

- Open: W. Burton (Gisborne)
- Women: P. Bryan (Auckland)

=== Athletics ===
- Lionel Fox wins his first national title in the men's marathon, clocking 2:54:09.2 in Wellington.

=== Chess ===
- The 52nd National Chess Championship was held in Auckland, and was won by R.G. Wade of Wellington (his 2nd win).

=== Horse racing ===
==== Harness racing ====
- New Zealand Trotting Cup – Gold Bar
- Auckland Trotting Cup – Sea Born

=== Lawn bowls ===
The national outdoor lawn bowls championships are held in Auckland.

- Men's singles champion – J.S. Martin (Carlton Bowling Club)
- Men's pair champions – J.W. Darroch, L. Russell (skip) (Auckland Bowling Club)
- Men's fours champions – J. Franklin, H. Berry, J.A. Maher, Arthur Engebretsen (skip) (Heretaunga Bowling Club)

=== Rugby union ===
Category:Rugby union in New Zealand, Category:All Blacks

- Ranfurly Shield

=== Rugby league ===
New Zealand national rugby league team

=== Soccer ===
- The Chatham Cup is won by Western of Christchurch who beat Wellington Marist 4–3 in the final.
- Provincial league champions:
  - Auckland: Philomel
  - Canterbury: Western
  - Hawke's Bay: Napier HSOB
  - Nelson: RNZAF
  - Otago: Mosgiel
  - South Canterbury: No competition
  - Southland: No competition
  - Taranaki: Old Boys
  - Waikato: Rotowaro
  - Wanganui: No competition
  - Wellington: Wellington Marist

== Births ==
- 17 January: Jeanette Fitzsimons, politician and environmentalist (d. 2020).
- 30 January: Eion Edgar, businessman, sports administrator, and philanthropist (d. 2021).
- 5 February: Michael Cullen, politician (d. 2021).
- 21 February: Jim McLay, politician.
- 4 April: Bryan Andrews, cricketer.
- 11 April: David McPhail, comedian, actor, writer (d. 2021).
- 11 April: Winston Peters, politician.
- 5 September: Conal Coad, opera singer.
- 7 September: Vic Pollard, cricketer.
- 10 October: Moana Jackson, lawyer (d. 2022).
- 19 September Bill Jeffries, politician.
- 15 November: Roger Donaldson, film director.
- 15 December: Michael King, historian (d. 2004).

== Deaths ==
- February: David Russell, soldier awarded the George Cross.
- 10 March: Edith Joan Lyttleton, writer.
- 15 April: Raffaello Squarise, Italian violinist
- 6 June: Ewen Alison, politician.
- 24 August Michael Reardon, political activist
- 11 December: Albert Moss, cricketer.

== See also ==
- History of New Zealand
- List of years in New Zealand
- Military history of New Zealand
- Timeline of New Zealand history
- Timeline of New Zealand's links with Antarctica
- Timeline of the New Zealand environment

For world events and topics in 1945 not specifically related to New Zealand see: 1945
