= Dolce Ann Cabot =

New Zealand journalist and newspaper editor

Dolce Ann Cabot (1862–1943) was a New Zealand journalist, newspaper editor, feminist, and teacher. She was probably the first woman in New Zealand to have been employed by a newspaper, editing the "Ladies' Page" of The Canterbury Times from May 1894.

== Biography ==
Born in Christchurch on 25 November 1862, Dolce Ann Cabot was the daughter of Thomas Cabot, a farmer and teacher from Jersey, and his wife Louisa Augusta Kunkel of German extraction. She was brought up on the family farm at Otipua near Timaru where she was first educated privately. After spending two years at Christchurch Girls' High School (1878–80), she studied teacher training at Christchurch Normal School. She later became an extramural student at Canterbury College but did not complete the degree course.

Cabot taught at Timaru Main School from 1880 to 1891. On the basis of a number of articles on woman's suffrage, she was employed by The Canterbury Times', a Christchurch newspaper, where she edited the Ladies' Page from 1894 to 1907. It is believed she was the first woman to join the staff of a New Zealand newspaper.

Initially an ardent suffragist, her editorial emphasis was on education, good health and Christian values as priorities for women's successful development but she denounced child marriage in India and the wearing of sealskin coats. As time went by, she was less emphatic about the extension of women's rights, turning to the importance of a woman's role as a housewife and a mother.

On 30 October 1907, she married Andrew Duncan, a station master. She left The Canterbury Times, moving with her husband to Greymouth (1910), Wellington (1912) and Auckland (1915). In 1922, she helped to launch Auckland's Ladies' Mirror, but only published three articles in the magazine. By and large, while married she discontinued her interest in writing and feminism, devoting her efforts to raising her seven stepchildren.

On Duncan's retirement, the couple moved to Manurewa (1922) In 1928, they returned to Christchurch (1935) where Duncan died in 1935. Dulce Ann Cabot died in Christchurch on 31 May 1943.
