= Arthur Cook (New Zealand politician) =

New Zealand politician

The Honourable Arthur Cook MLC
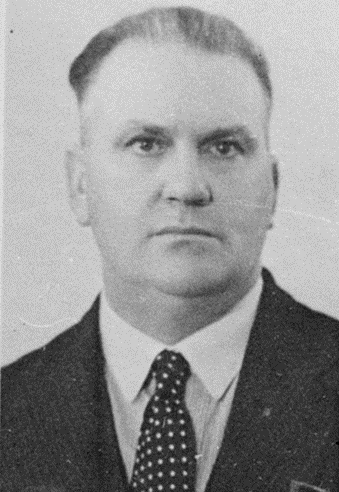

Member of the Legislative Council
- In office 10 September 1942 – 4 March 1943

Personal details
- Born: 30 November 1885 Australia
- Died: 4 March 1943 (aged 57) Off the Azores
- Party: Labour Party

Arthur Cook (30 November 1885 – 4 March 1943) was a member of the New Zealand Legislative Council from 10 September 1942 to 4 March 1943, when he died. He was appointed by the First Labour Government.

He was born in Campbell Town, Tasmania, Australia in 1885 and came to New Zealand around 1910. He was a shearer, and was president of the Shearers' Union and secretary from 1924 to 1942 of the New Zealand Workers' Union which grew out of the Shearers' Union. He was President of the Alliance of Labour 1926–36, and in the 1920s a bitter critic of the Labour Party.

He was from Wellington. When he was appointed, he had retired recently from the position of general secretary of the New Zealand Workers' Union. He died when the ship California Star, which was taking him to a trade union conference in Britain, was torpedoed by German submarine U-515.
