= 1938 in New Zealand =

- Decades: 1910s; 1920s; 1930s; 1940s; 1950s
- See also: History of New Zealand; List of years in New Zealand; Timeline of New Zealand history

The following lists events that happened during 1938 in New Zealand.

== Population ==
- Estimated population as of 31 December: 1,618,500.
- Increase since 31 December 1937: 16,500 (1.03%).
- Males per 100 females: 103.2.

== Incumbents ==
=== Regal and viceregal ===
- Head of State – George VI
- Governor-General – The Viscount Galway GCMG DSO OBE PC

=== Government ===
The 25th New Zealand Parliament continues with the Labour Party in government. The general election in October results in the Labour government being returned for the 26th New Zealand Parliament.

- Speaker of the House – Bill Barnard (Labour Party)
- Prime Minister – Michael Joseph Savage
- Minister of Finance – Walter Nash
- Minister of Foreign Affairs – Michael Joseph Savage
- Attorney-General – Rex Mason
- Chief Justice – Sir Michael Myers

=== Parliamentary opposition ===
- Leader of the Opposition – Adam Hamilton (National Party).

=== Main centre leaders ===
- Mayor of Auckland – Ernest Davis
- Mayor of Wellington – Thomas Hislop
- Mayor of Christchurch – John Beanland then Robert M. Macfarlane
- Mayor of Dunedin – Edwin Thomas Cox then Andrew Henson Allen

== Events ==
- 19 February: 21 people working on the Wairoa-Gisborne railway are drowned when a flash flood hits a works camp at Kopuawhara near Mahia.
- The Times, formerly The Gisborne Times, is purchased by its opposition, The Poverty Bay Herald, which the following year becomes The Gisborne Herald.

== Arts and literature ==
See 1938 in art, 1938 in literature, Category:1938 books

=== Music ===
See: 1938 in music

=== Radio ===
See: Public broadcasting in New Zealand

- 10 October – Radio station 2ZA launches in Palmerston North on 1400 kHz.

=== Film ===
- New Zealand Review no.5, Mountain Holiday,

See: Category:1938 film awards, 1938 in film, List of New Zealand feature films, Cinema of New Zealand, Category:1938 films

== Sport ==
=== Basketball ===
An interprovincial championship is held even though there is no national association at this time.

- Interpovincial Champions – Men: Otago

=== British Empire Games ===
Gold	Silver	Bronze	Total
5	7	13	25

=== Chess ===
- The 47th National Chess Championship was held in Dunedin, and was won by S. Hindin of Christchurch.

=== Golf ===
- The 28th New Zealand Open championship was won by A.D. Locke.
- The 42nd National Amateur Championships were held in Otago
  - Men: JP.G.F. Smith (Akarana)
  - Women – matchplay: Miss S. Collins
  - Women – strokeplay: Mrs R. Fullerton-Smith

=== Horse racing ===
==== Harness racing ====
- New Zealand Trotting Cup – Morello
- Auckland Trotting Cup –Navy Blue

=== Lawn bowls ===
The national outdoor lawn bowls championships are held in Dunedin.

- Men's singles champion – W.D. Bennett (Hastings Bowling Club)
- Men's pair champions – R.B. Clarke, C.E. Tyrrell (skip) (Roslyn Bowling Club)
- Men's fours champions – Stanley Snedden, F. Redpath, P. Munn, H. Wilson (skip) (Linwood Bowling Club)

=== Rugby ===
Category:Rugby union in New Zealand, Category:All Blacks

- Ranfurly Shield

=== Rugby league ===
New Zealand national rugby league team

=== Shooting ===
- Ballinger Belt –
  - Robert Bodley (South Africa)
  - Douglas Roots (Patea), second, top New Zealander

=== Soccer ===
- The Chatham Cup is won by Waterside who beat Mosgiel 4–0 in the final.
- Provincial league champions:
  - Auckland: North Shore United
  - Canterbury: Nomads United
  - Hawke's Bay: Napier United
  - Nelson: YMCA
  - Otago: Mosgiel
  - South Canterbury: Northern
  - Southland: Invercargill Thistle
  - Taranaki: Waitara
  - Waikato: Hamilton Wanderers
  - Wanganui: Marist
  - Wellington: Waterside Karori

== Births ==
- 21 January – Jim Anderton, politician (died 2018)
- 11 February – Bevan Congdon, cricketer (died 2018)
- 15 February – Russell Marshall, politician (died 2025)
- 24 February – Murray Hudson, soldier, winner of the George Cross (died 1974)
- 26 May – Pauline Parker, convicted murderer (died 2026)
- 11 July – Ron Sang, architect and art collector (died 2021)
- 12 July – Stan Meads, rugby union player
- 24 July – John Sparling, cricketer
- 29 July – Millie Khan, lawn bowler (died 2003)
- 28 August – Aroha Reriti-Crofts, politician and community activist (died 2022)
- 10 September – Colin Beyer, lawyer and businessman (died 2015)
- 11 October – William Taylor, children's writer and politician (died 2015)
- 12 October – Geoff Murphy, film director (died 2018)
- 28 October – Anne Perry, convicted murderer (died 2023)
- 29 October – Douglas Myers, businessman (died 2017)
- 15 November – Peter Sinclair, radio and television host (died 2001)
- 24 November – Wynne Bradburn, cricketer (died 2008)
- 1 December – Bill Playle, cricketer (died 2019)
- 2 December – Jonathan Hunt, politician and diplomat (died 2024)
- 17 December – Peter Snell, athlete (died 2019)
- 18 December – Syd Jackson, political activist (died 2007)
- 23 December – Michael Hill, entrepreneur (died 2025)

== Deaths ==
- 10 February: Sir Frederic Truby King, director of child welfare. (b. 1858)
- 22 February: Lindsay Buick, historian, journalist, politician. (b. 1865)
- 1 April: William Blomfield, cartoonist. (b. 1866)
- 12 July: Isabella Foster Rogers Kells, teacher, postmistress and community leader (b. 1861)
- 30 July: Alfred Brandon, Mayor of Wellington. (b. 1854)
- 15 December: James Whyte Kelly, politician. (b. 1855)

=== Full date unknown ===
- Eria Tutara-Kauika Raukura, tribal tohunga. (b. 1834)

== See also ==
- History of New Zealand
- List of years in New Zealand
- Military history of New Zealand
- Timeline of New Zealand history
- Timeline of New Zealand's links with Antarctica
- Timeline of the New Zealand environment
