= Drago Došen =

Serbian artist (1943–2019)

- Born: Drago Došen; 15 October 1943; Prijedor, Bosnia and Herzegovina
- Died: 16 November 2019 (aged 76); Auckland, New Zealand
- Known for: Painter

Drago Došen (Serbian: Драго Дошен; pronounced [drǎgo doʃên]; 15 October 1943 – 16 November 2019) was a Serbian artist. His paintings and drawings link him to the early 1970s generation of Belgrade painters who turned toward a fundamental experience of nature, reinstating the subject theme in their paintings.

Drago Došen was born in Bosnia in 1943. At a very early age, Došen dedicated himself to the art in which he showed a great talent that led him to a high school of art in Sarajevo.

Upon the completion of high school, Došen continued his studies in Belgrade, where he spent most of his career and established himself as an artist. He graduated from the Academy of the Applied Arts at the University of Belgrade in 1970.

Došen started exhibiting his work in 1975 throughout the former Yugoslavia and other parts of Europe. His work gained attention and it did not take long before his paintings received positive reviews from his fellow artists and the general public.

Throughout 20 years of exhibiting in a number of galleries in many countries, Došen managed to sell well over 400 paintings that went to private and public collections.

In 1995, Došen moved to New Zealand, where he continued to paint and exhibit his work until 2010.

== Reviews ==
Došen's painting is conceived in the subconscious of perception, more in the sphere of obscure recollections than in clearly defined forms of reality.

The artist's imagination turns the perceivable into the poetic haze of the painting, into the form and content of a new reality in artistic awareness.

Došen's scenes are made up of pigment, dreams, and memories. They are painted in a watercolour style. They show the craftsmanship of the Northern Renaissance, a moving Neo-Classicism that seems to have gotten lost in a time.

Došen's ink drawings and watercolours often portray ambient and nostalgic scenes. Došen's art has been praised for bringing these scenes to life in his artwork.

Došen's work often depicts themes that juxtapose contemporary life with elements of historical and cultural heritage.
