= Emma Maria Walrond =

English-born New Zealand landscape painter

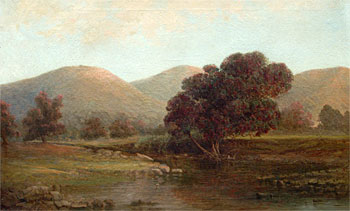
Warrens Creek by Emma Maria Walrond

Emma Maria Walrond (née Evans; 1859 – 10 October 1943) was an English-born New Zealand landscape painter known for her landscapes located in the parts of North Island.

== Biography ==
Born Emma Maria Evans in England, she was the daughter of Thomas Fisher Evans. On 7 December 1881, she married Robert Bruce Walrond, a New Zealander, at St Marylebone Parish Church, London, and they moved to Auckland. They had a son, Cecil.

She began exhibiting in the late 1880s (usually as Mrs. E. M. Walrond) and continued until at least 1907, transitioning from floral still lifes to the landscapes of the North Island countryside for which she is best known. She painted in both oils and watercolours and was successful in selling her work. Some of her work is in the collection of the National Library of New Zealand.

Walrond died in Auckland on 10 October 1943, and was buried at Waikumete Cemetery.
