= Installations of the United States Navy in New Zealand =

Former naval bases of the United States in New Zealand

Coordinates: 41°18′S 174°47′E

United States Navy installations in New Zealand
- Location of New Zealand dark green
- 1942 (closed 1944)
- Time zone: UTC+12 (NZST)

The United States Navy maintained a number of naval installations in New Zealand during the Pacific War of World War II.

Many were built by the US Navy Seabees, Naval Construction Battalions, during the Pacific War. New Zealand was used for staging and training troops before action and for R&R-rest and recreation after action. The Red Cross operated five dining clubs. For the wounded, there were 19 hospitals in New Zealand that could handle up to 10,000 patients. Most Naval activities were at Naval Base Auckland and Naval Base Wellington. The bases were closed in 1944 as troops moved to more northern US bases.

== History ==
New Zealand entered World War II with Great Britain by declaring war on Nazi Germany in 1939. New Zealand had entered the war with the Empire of Japan alongside Great Britain on 8 December 1941 when Japanese forces invaded Malaya and bombed Singapore.

On 6 January 1942 the USS President Polk arrived at Wellington's Queen's Wharf. The President Polk had 55 USAAF pilots and 55 Curtiss P-40 and four Douglas C-53 aircraft aboard. The President Polk departed San Francisco to take aircraft to US Naval Base Philippines, but Philippines was not safe any longer. President Polk refuelled in Wellington and was redirected to Naval Base Brisbane.

With Japanese forces moving further south, New Zealand asked the United Kingdom for protection. Winston Churchill requested Franklin D. Roosevelt send troops to New Zealand on 5 March 1942, so New Zealand troops could stay in Egypt as part of the North African campaign, Roosevelt agreed and sent troops.

The first United States troops arrived in New Zealand on 12 June 1942 at Waitematā Harbour in Auckland. On 14 June 1942 the troopship USS Wakefield arrived at Wellington.

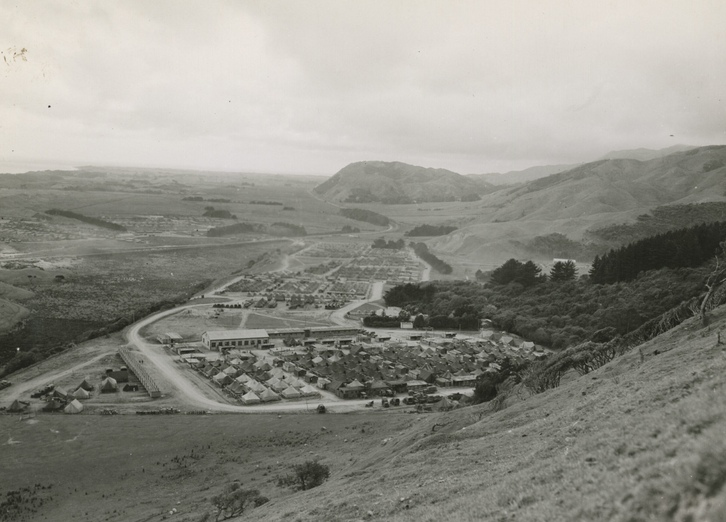
Camp Paekākāriki in 1943 in New Zealand

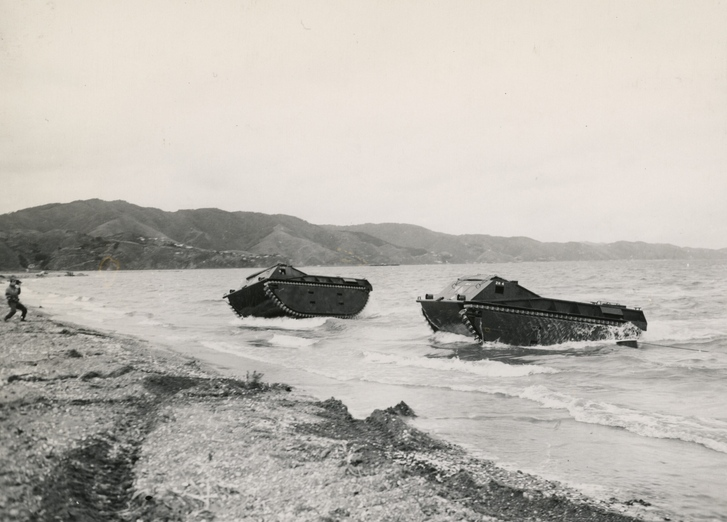
Landing Vehicle Tracked training in New Zealand in 1943

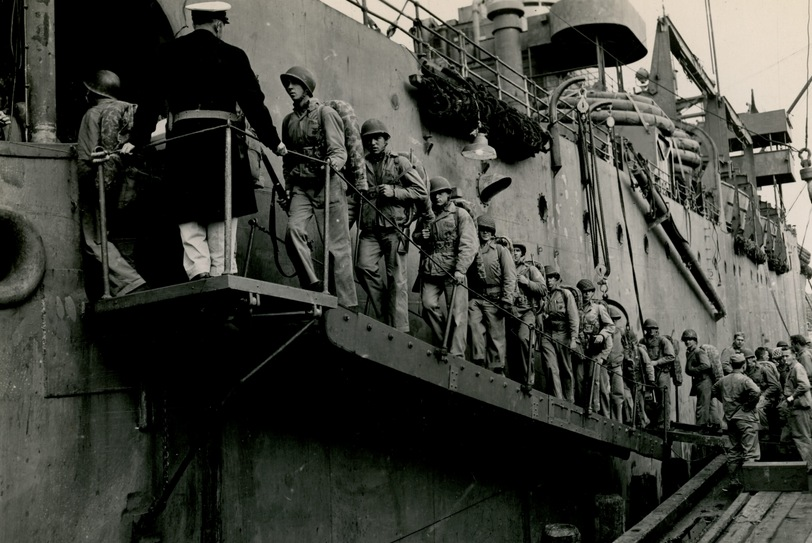
Camp Paekākārik US Troops departing New Zealand in 1943, as deployment to South Pacific War

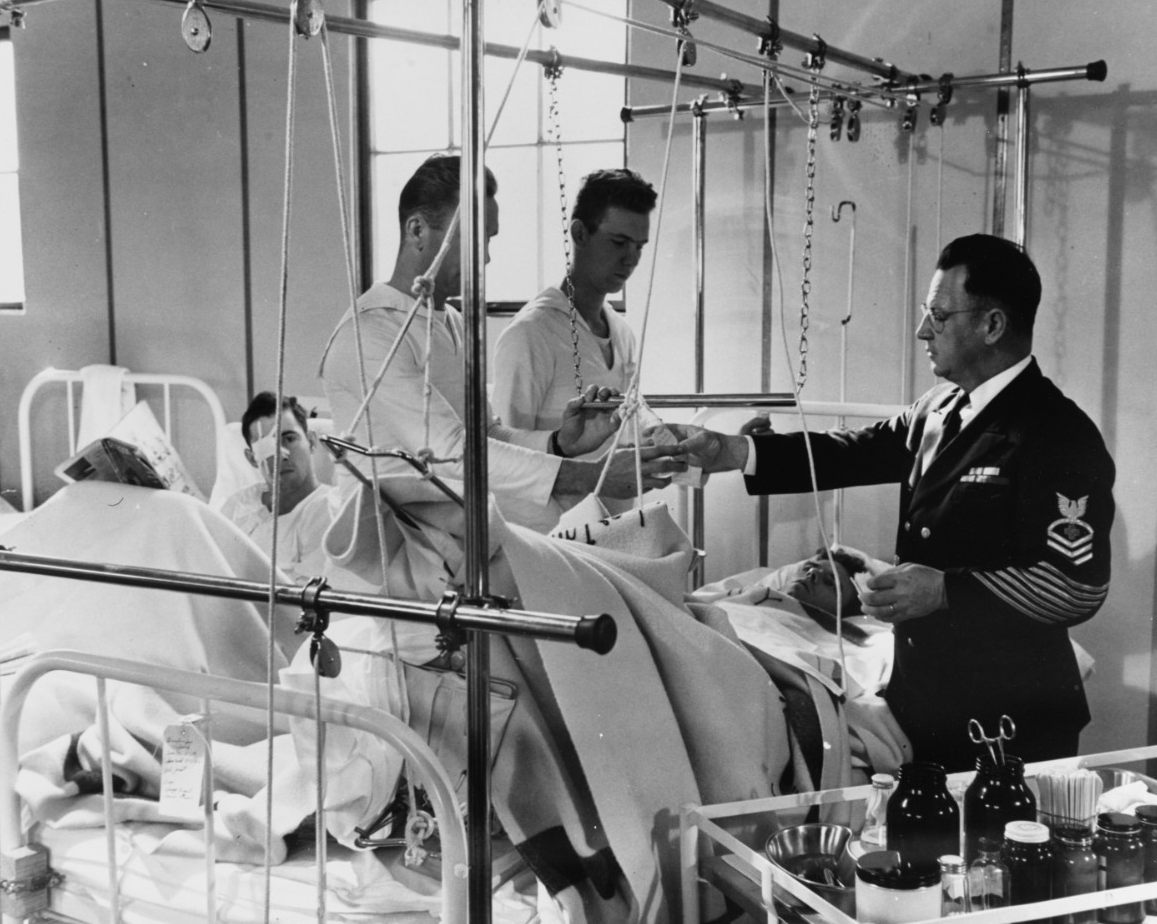
Naval Mobile Base Hospital, Auckland, New Zealand

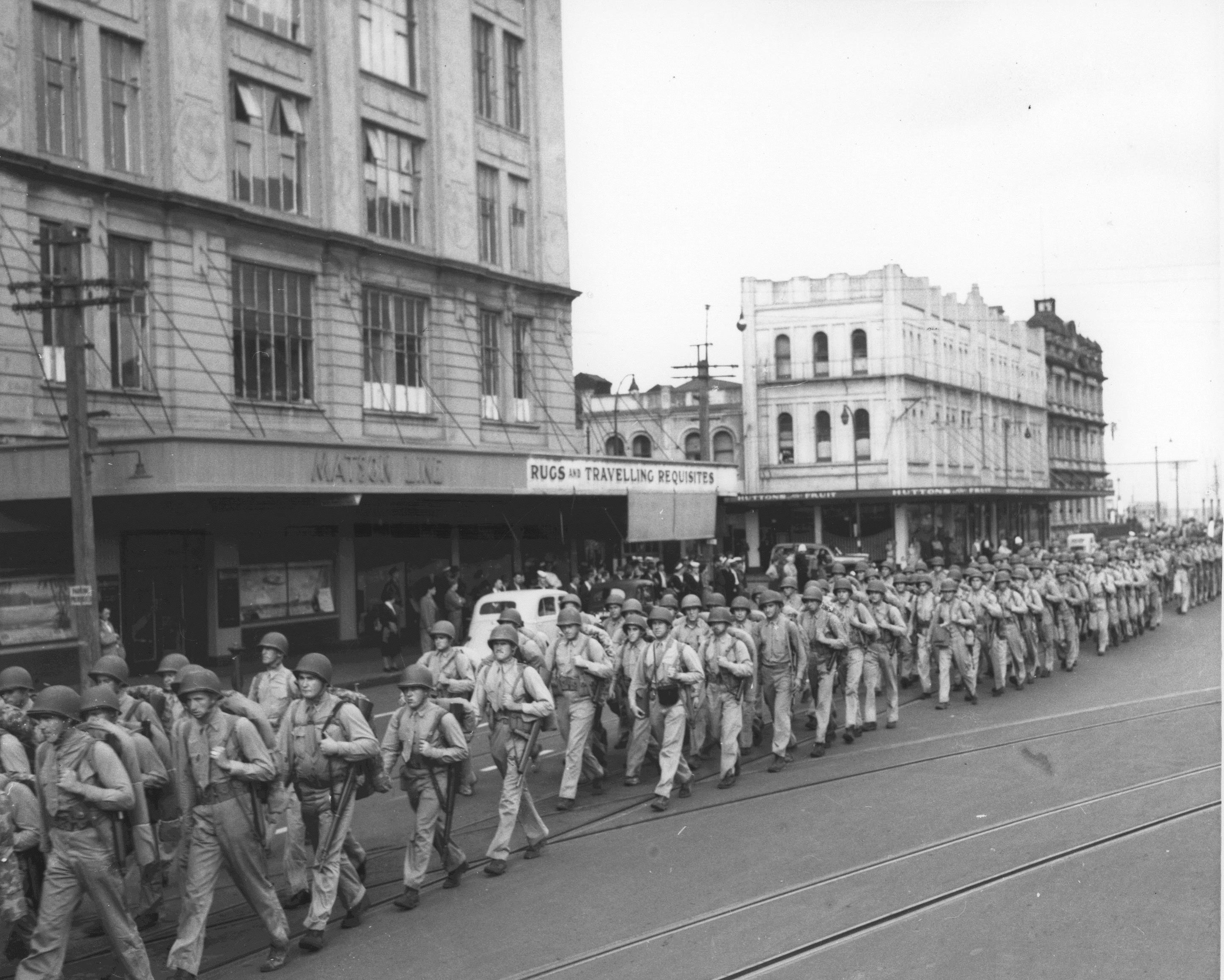
US parade Through Auckland in 1943

New Zealand and US Naval Base Australia became the staging for the Pacific War in the South West Pacific theatre, the Philippines, New Guinea and the Dutch East Indies. The Red Cross ran Red Cross clubs in Warkworth, Masterton, and at the Hotel Cecil near Wellington railway station. In Auckland Hotels there were officers Red Cross clubs and enlisted men's club. The clubs offered a slice of home with US food, library, table tennis and pool, music, and dance. The YMCA in Auckland held events for the troops also. There were some problems like the Battle of Manners Street, a riot at Te Aro, Wellington on 3 April 1943. In December 1942 there were over 15,000 US troops in New Zealand. In 1943 and the first half of 1944 there were about 30,000 troops stationed in New Zealand. The troops were either getting ready to deploy or returning from action. By the end of 1943 the war and moved closer to Japan and the US Navy had built new bases closer to the action, so fewer troops were stationed in New Zealand. In October 1943 the US Marines were redeployed from New Zealand. US Naval Base Auckland was closed in October 1944. About 1,500 New Zealand women joined Operation Magic Carpet as war brides and traveled to the United States.

For the International Geophysical Year of 1957-58, U.S. forces returned to New Zealand to set up supply lines for the US Antarctic Research Program. The U.S. presence in Antarctica was continued beyond 1957 and became Operation Deep Freeze. For many years there was a U.S. presence at Harewood Airport in Christchurch, which was then shifted to the new Christchurch International Airport. Military Airlift Command maintains a military airlift support detachment at the airport, often using Air National Guard aircraft.

== Bases in Auckland ==
- Naval Base Auckland, at Waitematā Harbour: Fleet Post Office (FPO) #132 SF
- Naval Operating Base Auckland, FPO# 1500
- Hobson Park Hospital, 1,000 beds (Navy Mobile Hospital No.4)
- Fuel Tank Farm, Northcote, Auckland
- Avondale Naval Hospital, Avondale, Auckland, 2,000 bed, built by Seebees 25th CB
- Mechanics Bay, Auckland, 1,340 Navy men, crew off ships docked in the harbour for repair.
- Sylvia Park Stores, Mount Wellington, Auckland
- Mangere Crossing Stores, Māngere, Auckland
- Halsey Street Store, Wynyard Quarter, Auckland
- Shore Patrol Base (MP), on Airedale Street
- Hilldene, Papakura, Auckland
- Little Riverina, Wilsons Road, Warkworth
- Tamaki Stores, Glen Innes, Auckland
- Kauri Point Armament Depot, US Navy Magazines
- Whangateau Hall & Reserve

At Auckland there were many small, medium and large camps that could house 29,500 troops:

- Victoria Park, Auckland US Troop Camp
- US Navy Mobile Hospital Auckland
- Auckland outlining camps
- US Navy Magazines and staging camp Motutapu Island
- Camp Hale
- Cornwall Hospital at Cornwall Park Hospital, 1,500 beds
- Pākiri Beach Camp
- Hillcrest Camp, Anti-Aircraft Artillery

=== Devonport Naval Base ===
Devonport Naval Base is the Royal New Zealand Navy's principal naval base and shipyard, in Auckland. The base and its drydocks were also used by the US Navy during World War II. At the base are the Calliope Drydock, Devonport Defence Health Centre, training base, a jetty used for training, and port operations.

- HMNZS Philomel, training base.
- HMNZS Tamaki, training base on Motuihe Island

== Wellington ==
- Base at Wellington, Wellington Harbour and on the Kāpiti Coast District: FPO# 133
- Oriental Parade, Wellington, Major Base
- Porirua Harbour base
- Naval Base Hospital No. 4, Wellington, New Zealand
- Silverstream Hospital
- Kaiwharawhara Park, Kaiwharawhara, Wellington

Troop camps for 21,000 troops:

- Wellington outlining camps
- Hotel St George, Wellington Office Navy and Marine staff
- Anderson Park Camp, Wellington, for 4,000 US Navy personnel and 400-bed hospital
- Central Park, Wellington, Camp for Navy and Marine
- Port Underwood training camp
- Camp Paekakariki at Paekākāriki, on old golf course, now a town
- Camp Russell now Queen Elizabeth Park at Paekākāriki
- Camp McKay (also spelled Mackay) at Paekākāriki, MacKay's Crossing, now Whareroa Farm
- Judgeford Valley at Pāuatahanui, small camp
- Titahi Bay at Pāuatahanui, small camp
- Small camps at: Judgeford, Paremata, Tītahi Bay, Trentham, Waterloo, Hutt Park, Gracefield, Stokes Valley, Kaiwharra, BoatHarbour, Hataitai, Johnsonville and Takapu Road.

== Hutt ==
- Silverstream Naval Hospital, Upper Hutt
- Trentham Racecourse Hospital, Trentham, Upper Hutt
- Hutt Park, in Lower Hutt, Horse raceway to camp
- Petone Amphibious landing beach training at Eastbourne
- Māhia Peninsula landing beach training

== Oriental Bay ==
Boat Harbour at Oriental Bay was a major US Navy service and repair facility for landing craft. The Landing Craft were used in amphibious landing training near Wellington before the invasion of Tarawa. Before the expansion of Oriental Bay Base the Navy also used the Oriental Hotel for housing. Also at the base was small Naval hospital and dispensary. The hospital is now clubrooms of the Royal Port Nicholson Yacht Club. Ships arriving had Landing Craft Vehicle Personnel (LCVP) and Landing Craft Navigation (LCN) on board, some for training and others for upcoming operations.

== Seabees ==
United States Navy Construction Battalions ("Seabees"), did much construction work in New Zealand. Seabees were sent to New Zealand for rest and relaxation after building bases in the South Pacific, often around the clock. Seabee were sometimes also deployed to help the Royal New Zealand Air Force (RNZAF) and Royal New Zealand Navy. Turtle Bay Airfield at Naval Base Espiritu Santo and Kukum Field were some of the projects the Seabee worked with the RNZAF to build and operate. 6th Seabees rested and worked at the Victoria Park camp, also the Navy Mobile Hospital at Auckland. Seabees and troops at Naval Base Guadalcanal were sent to New Zealand for R&R after the Battle of Guadalcanal. At the end of the war the US bases were turned over to New Zealand.

- Battalions that spent time in New Zealand were: 6, 11, 15, 18 24, 25, 27, 33, 35, 58, 63, and CBMU 502.

== Airfields ==
Shared Royal New Zealand Air Force airbases during the war:

- Wellington Airfield now Wellington Airport
- RNZAF Base Auckland
- RNZAF Base Ohakea
- RNZAF Base Woodbourne
- RNZAF Station Harewood now Christchurch Airport
- Wigram Airfield now Wigram Airfield Circuit
- RNZAF Station Te Pirita
- Mangere Aerodrome

== Gallery ==
New Zealand main cities

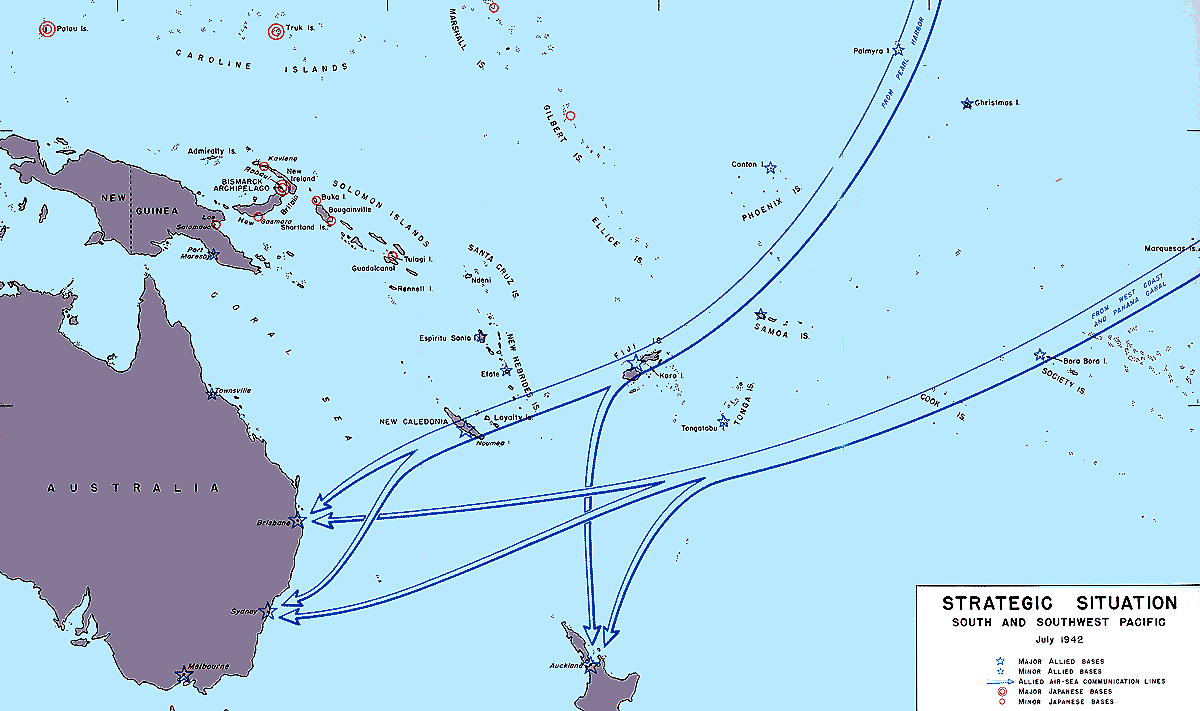
Strategic supply chain situation in South Pacific in July 1942

United States Merchant Navy routes durning World War 2, including New Zealand

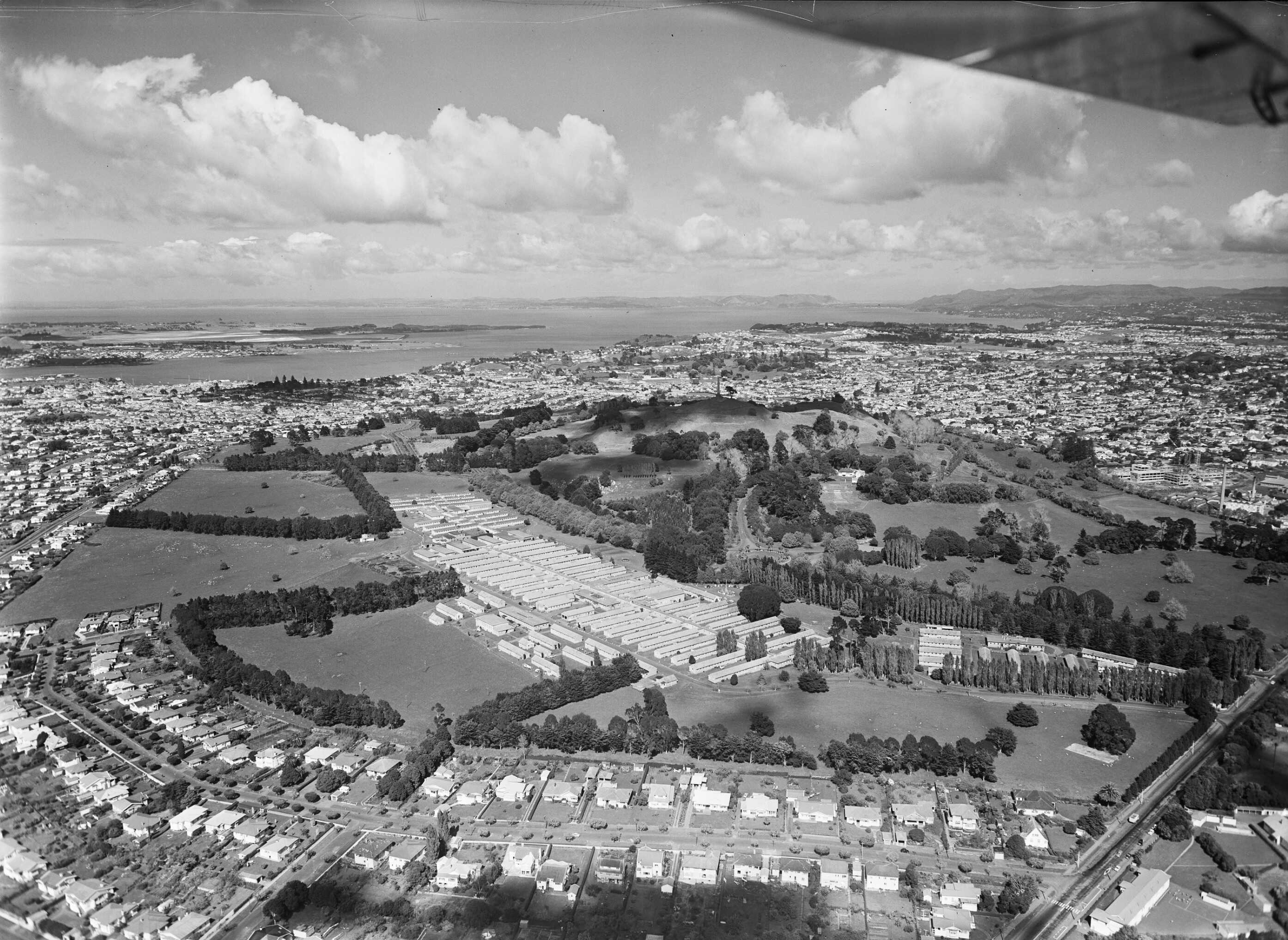
Aerial view of Cornwall Hospital

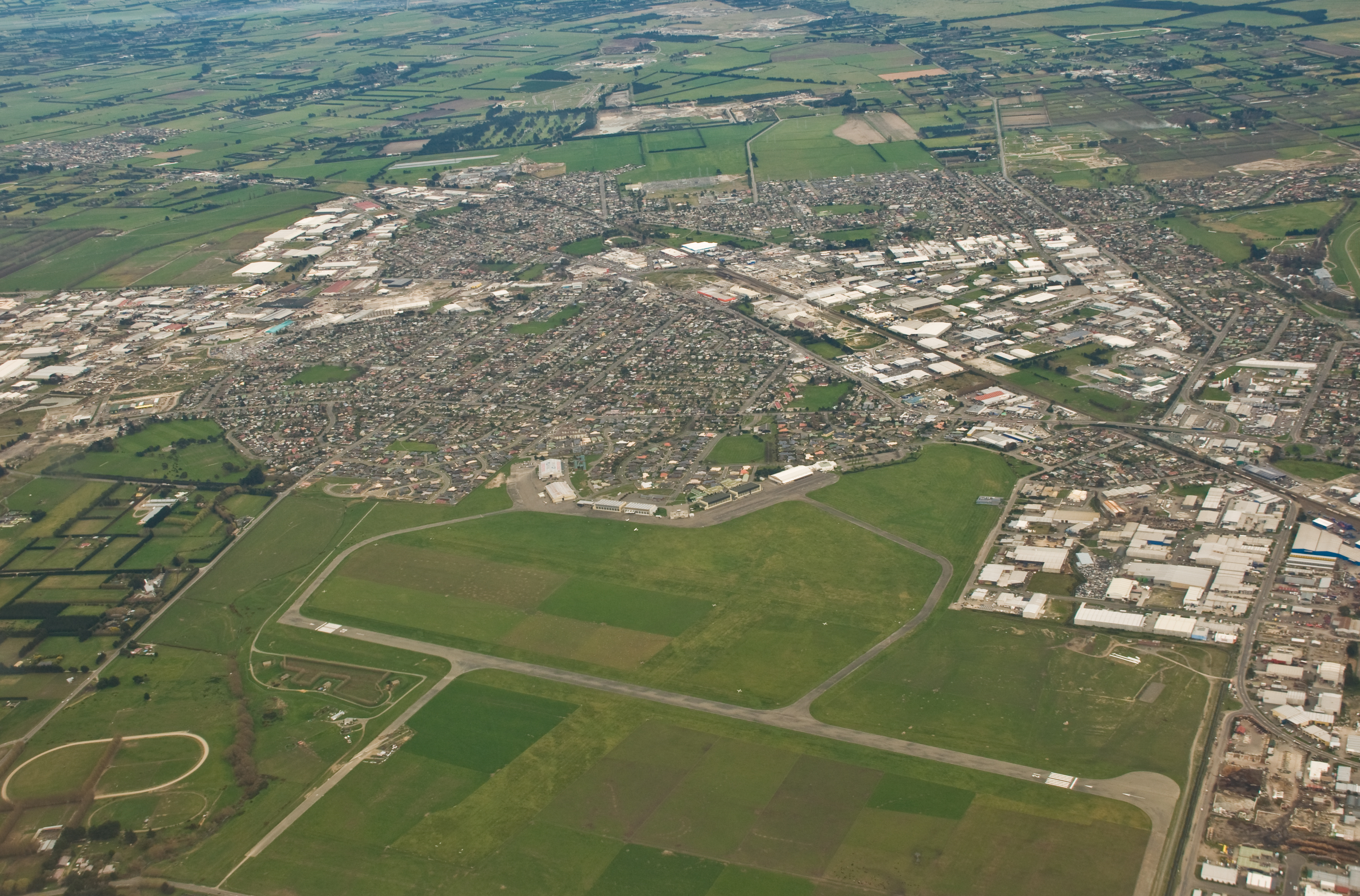
Wigram Airfield at city of Christchurch

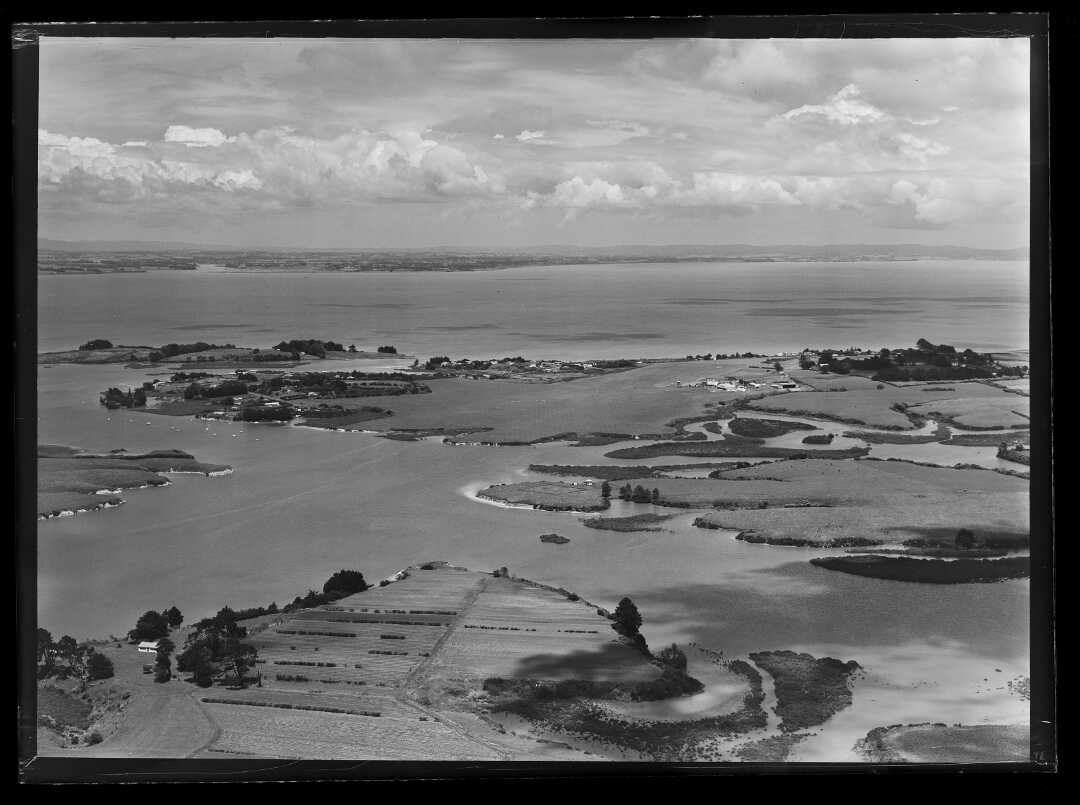
The Mangere Aerodrome

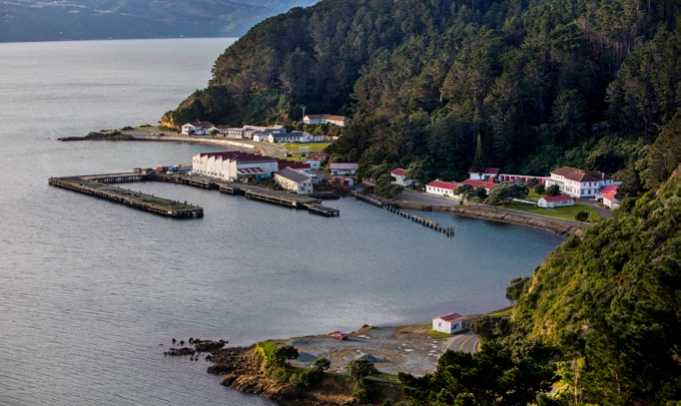
Former Wellington Naval Base at Shelly Bay

Provinces of New Zealand

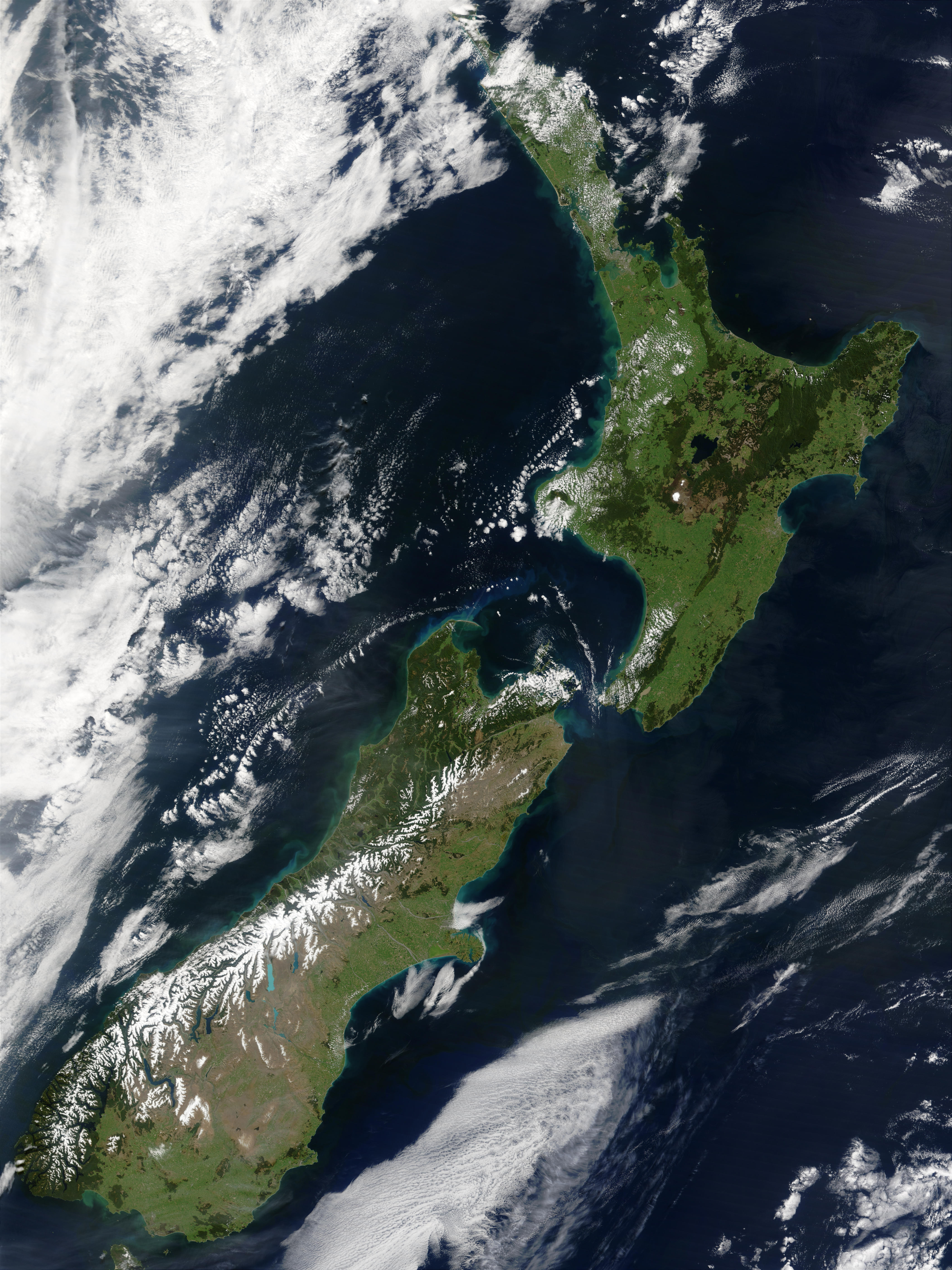
Islands of New Zealand as seen from satellite

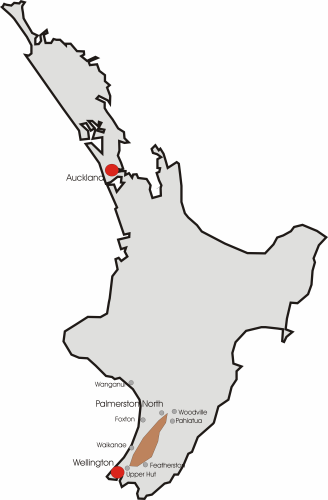
New Zealand North Island

== See also ==
- US Naval Advance Bases
- Naval Base Fiji
- World War II United States Merchant Navy
- Military history of New Zealand during World War II
- Coastal fortifications of New Zealand
- Auckland War Memorial Museum
- World War II United States Merchant Navy
- Pacific Islands home front during World War II
- Axis naval activity in New Zealand waters
