= Axis naval activity in New Zealand waters =

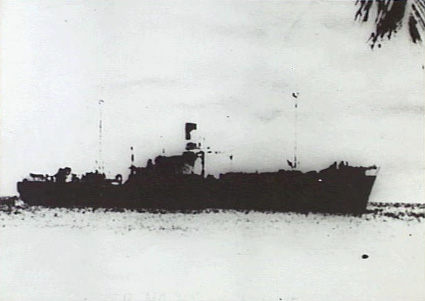
The German surface raider Komet, which made two operational cruises in New Zealand waters during World War II

A small number of Axis surface raiders and submarines operated in New Zealand Waters during World War II.

== Surface raiders ==
The following German surface raiders operated in New Zealand waters:

- Orion (13–19 June 1940, late August 1940, late September 1940, November 1940, March 1941)
- Komet (November 1940, June 1941)
- Small auxiliary raider Adjutant (June 1941)
- Tanker Ole Jacob (March 1941)

The Orion and Komet sank three ships in New Zealand waters during these operations, while a fourth struck a mine laid by Orion and sank. The three ships sunk were:

- Turakina, on 20 August 1940, a steamer (8,706 tons) bound for Wellington from Sydney.
- Holmwood, on 25 November 1940, a steamer (546 tons) bound from the Chatham Islands for Lyttelton.
- RMS Rangitane, on 27 November 1940; a motor ship left Auckland on 24 November for Britain with a cargo of meat, dairy products and wool. She transmitted that she was under attack, and the "savage and ruthless" shelling killed 16 people (8 passengers and 8 crew).
- The liner RMS Niagara was sunk by a mine laid by Orion off Whangarei on 19 June 1940. She was carrying British gold destined for the United States.

The minesweeper HMNZS Puriri was sunk by a mine while sweeping in the Hauraki Gulf on 14 May 1941 and sank with the death of five of her crew. Three seamen were injured and the remaining 24 (5 officers and 19 ratings) were unhurt.

== Submarines ==
=== Imperial Japanese Navy ===
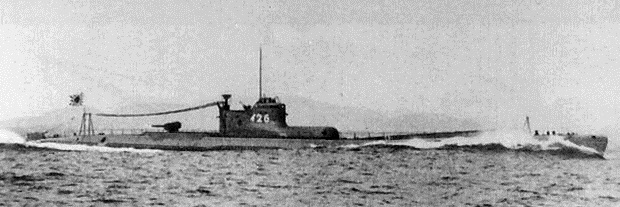
The Japanese submarine I-25

Imperial Japanese Navy submarines operated in New Zealand waters in 1942 and 1943:

- I-29 is said to have operated off New Zealand in February 1942, although this seems unlikely given its construction was only completed in February. Its floatplane, a Yokosuka E14Y, was also said to have overflown Wellington.
- I-25 operated off New Zealand in early March 1942. Nobuo Fujita from I-25 in a Yokosuka E14Y floatplane conducted reconnaissance flights over Wellington on 8 March and Auckland on 13 March before departing for Fiji.
- I-21 briefly operated off the northern tip of New Zealand in May 1942. I-21's floatplane flown by Lieutenant Ito Isuma conducted a reconnaissance flight over Thames and then Auckland on 24 May. Auckland was blanketed by heavy fog, and when Auckland Airport heard a plane apparently in trouble, it turned on the runway lights, allowing Ito to regain his bearings and retrace the path to the submarine
- An unknown Japanese submarine operated off New Zealand around 22–23 February 1943. This was one of several reported sightings in the period up to early 1944.

Neither I-21 nor I-25 attacked any ships during their brief periods in New Zealand waters. Initially Japanese submarine commanders were under strict orders to save their torpedoes for aircraft carriers and battleships.

The freighter Kalingo (2047 tons) bound for New Plymouth was torpedoed and sunk by I-21 on 18 January 1943, when she was 180 km (110 mi) east of Sydney, with the loss of 2 of her crew of 34.

=== Kriegsmarine ===
The German submarine U-862 sailed down the east coast of New Zealand in January 1945. U-862—under the command of Korvettenkapitän Heinrich Timm—entered New Zealand waters on 1 January 1945 after operating off Australia. The boat rounded the tip of the North Island on 7 January and proceeded down the east coast. She encountered a merchant ship off Cape Brett on 10 January but was not able to intercept it. The U-boat continued south and failed to reach firing position on another merchant ship off East Cape on 13 January.

On 15 January, Timm took his submarine very close to Gisborne in search of viable targets. While the submarine was not detected, Timm did not find any worthwhile ships to attack. Timm also sailed close to the shore of Napier on 16 January and attempted to torpedo a small merchant ship off the city. This attack was not successful, with the torpedo missing its target. Timm believed that U-862 had been sighted during this attack and left the area. This belief was not correct, however, and the New Zealand government remained unaware of the submarine's presence.

Shortly after the attack off Napier, U-862 received orders to return to her home base at Batavia. Timm immediately ceased his patrol and proceeded along the east coast of the South Island. U-862 rounded Stewart Island / Rakiura on 21 January and the submarine left New Zealand waters shortly thereafter. Claims that members of the submarine's crew landed in New Zealand are not correct, and this story appears to have been started by Timm as a joke.

== See also ==
- Military history of New Zealand in World War II
- Axis naval activity in Australian waters
- Royal New Zealand Navy
- Coastal Forces of the Royal New Zealand Navy
- Coastal fortifications of New Zealand
- Cape Expedition
- US Naval Base New Zealand
