= 1949 in New Zealand =

- Decades: 1920s; 1930s; 1940s; 1950s; 1960s
- See also: History of New Zealand; List of years in New Zealand; Timeline of New Zealand history

The following lists events that happened during 1949 in New Zealand.

Most New Zealanders became New Zealand citizens in addition to being British subjects, as the British Nationality and New Zealand Citizenship Act 1948 came into effect.

The National government of Sydney Holland was elected in the 1949 New Zealand general election.

== Population ==
- Estimated population as of 31 December: 1,892,100.
- Increase since 31 December 1948: 38,200 (2.06%).
- Males per 100 females: 100.7.

== Incumbents ==
=== Regal and viceregal ===
- Head of State – George VI
- Governor-General – Lieutenant-General The Lord Freyberg VC GCMG KCB KBE DSO

=== Government ===
The 28th New Zealand Parliament continued. Government was the Labour until after the November general election, which saw it replaced by National Party.

Iriaka Rātana (Labour) is the first Māori woman elected to Parliament.

- Speaker of the House – Robert McKeen
- Prime Minister – Peter Fraser then Sidney Holland
- Deputy Prime Minister – Keith Holyoake (from 13 December)
- Minister of Finance – Walter Nash then Sidney Holland
- Minister of Foreign Affairs – Peter Fraser then Frederick Doidge
- Attorney-General – Rex Mason then Clifton Webb
- Chief Justice – Sir Humphrey O'Leary

=== Parliamentary opposition ===
- Leader of the Opposition – Sidney Holland (National Party) until 13 December, then Peter Fraser (Labour).

=== Main centre leaders ===
- Mayor of Auckland – John Allum
- Mayor of Hamilton – Harold David Caro
- Mayor of Wellington – Will Appleton
- Mayor of Christchurch – Ernest Andrews
- Mayor of Dunedin – Donald Cameron

== Events ==
- 1 January: the status of New Zealand Citizen comes into existence.
- 9 March: Referendums on gambling (passed) and extending hotel hours (failed).
- 3 August: Referendum on military training (passed)
- 29 November: Elections to the four Māori electorates
- 30 November: General election won by National Party under Sidney Holland

== Arts and literature ==
See 1949 in art, 1949 in literature, Category:1949 books

=== Music ===
See: 1949 in music

=== Radio ===
See: Public broadcasting in New Zealand

- 18 January – Radio station 3XC (later 3ZC) luanches in Timaru on 1160 kHz.
- 27 April – Radio station 1YZ launches in Rotorua on 800 kHz.
- 2 July – Radio station 1XH (later 1ZH) launches in Hamilton on 1310 kHz.
- 27 August – Radio station 1XN (later 1ZN) launches in Whangarei on 970 kHz.
- 22 October – Radio station 2XA (later 2ZW) launches in Whanganui on 1200 kHz.

=== Film ===
See: Category:1949 film awards, 1949 in film, List of New Zealand feature films, Cinema of New Zealand, Category:1949 films

== Sport ==
=== Archery ===
National champions

- Open Men – W. Burton (Gisborne)
- Open Women – D. Johnstone (Dunedin)

=== Athletics ===
- George Bromley wins his second national title in the men's marathon, clocking 2:40:05.6 in Christchurch.

=== Basketball ===
- Interpovincial Champions: Men – Wellington
- Interpovincial Champions: Women – Palmerston North

=== Chess ===
- The 56th National Chess Championship was held in Wanganui, and was won by A.E. Nield of Auckland.

=== Horse racing ===
==== Harness racing ====
- New Zealand Trotting Cup – Loyal Nurse
- Auckland Trotting Cup – Captain Sandy (2nd win)

==== Thoroughbred racing ====
- The New Zealand horse Foxzami, ridden by W. Fellows, wins the 1949 Melbourne Cup

=== Lawn bowls ===
The national outdoor lawn bowls championships are held in Auckland.

- Men's singles champion – S. Gooch (Kahutia Bowling Club)
- Men's pair champions – Frank Livingstone, J.H. Mingins (skip) (Onehunga Bowling Club)
- Men's fours champions – A.J. Murdoch, H.L. Rule, A. Rivers, Pete Skoglund (skip) (Otahuhu Bowling Club)

=== Rugby ===
Category:Rugby union in New Zealand, Category:All Blacks

- 3 September: The All Blacks lose two tests on the same day
- Ranfurly Shield

=== Rugby league ===
New Zealand national rugby league team

=== Soccer ===
- The Chatham Cup is won by Petone who beat Northern 1–0 in the final.
- Provincial league champions:
  - Auckland: Eden
  - Canterbury: Technical OB
  - Hawke's Bay: Napier HSOB
  - Nelson:
  - Otago: Northern
  - South Canterbury: Northern Hearts
  - Southland: Brigadiers
  - Taranaki: City
  - Waikato: Rotowaro
  - Wanganui: Wanganui Athletic
  - Wellington: Seatoun

== Births ==
- 22 January: Cilla McQueen, poet
- 24 January: Bill Bush, rugby player
- 28 January: Mike Moore, Prime Minister and Director-General of the World Trade Organization (d. 2020)
- 15 February: Ashraf Choudhary, politician
- 19 February: Brenda Matthews, sprinter
- 28 April: Steve Gilpin, musician (d. 1992)
- 8 June: Sherryl Jordan, writer (d. 2023)
- 6 July: Grant McAuley, rower
- 12 July: Dame Karen Poutasi, government official (d. 2026)
- 20 September: Alan McIntyre, field hockey player
- 10 October: Lance Cairns, cricketer
- 2 November: Bruce Biddle, road cyclist
- 29 November (in England): Dave Bright, soccer player
- 5 December: Ray Comfort, Christian minister
- Laurence Aberhart, photographer
- Laurence Clark, cartoonist
- John Hanlon, musician
- Donna Awatere Huata, politician
- Nigel Brown, painter
- Ian Ewen-Street, politician

== Deaths ==
- 25 May: George William von Zedlitz, professor of languages
- 20 August: Annie Lee Rees, writer.
- 7 October: Matiu Ratana, politician and Ratana church leader
- 29 October: Patrick Harvey, rugby union player
- 20 December: Jane Mander, novelist
- 28 December: Jack Lovelock, athlete

== See also ==
- Category:1949 births
- Category:1949 deaths
- History of New Zealand
- List of years in New Zealand
- Military history of New Zealand
- Timeline of New Zealand history
- Timeline of New Zealand's links with Antarctica
- Timeline of the New Zealand environment
