= 1952 in New Zealand =

- Decades: 1930s; 1940s; 1950s; 1960s; 1970s
- See also: History of New Zealand; List of years in New Zealand; Timeline of New Zealand history

The following lists events that happened during 1952 in New Zealand.

The population of New Zealand reaches two million.

== Population ==
- Estimated population as of 31 December: 2,024,600.
- Increase since 31 December 1951: 54,100 (2.75%).
- Males per 100 females: 101.1.

== Incumbents ==
=== Regal and viceregal ===
- Head of State – George VI followed by Elizabeth II
- Governor-General – Lieutenant-General The Lord Freyberg VC, CGMG, KCB, Three Bars, KStJ followed by Lieutenant-General The Lord Norrie GCMG GCVO CB DSO MC

=== Government ===
The 30th New Zealand Parliament continued. In power was the National government under Sidney Holland.

- Speaker of the House – Mathew Oram
- Prime Minister – Sidney Holland
- Deputy Prime Minister – Keith Holyoake
- Minister of Finance – Sidney Holland
- Minister of Foreign Affairs – Clifton Webb
- Chief Justice — Sir Humphrey O'Leary

=== Parliamentary opposition ===
- Leader of the Opposition – Walter Nash (Labour).

=== Main centre leaders ===
- Mayor of Auckland – John Allum
- Mayor of Hamilton – Harold David Caro
- Mayor of Wellington – Robert Macalister
- Mayor of Christchurch – Robert Macfarlane
- Mayor of Dunedin – Leonard Morton Wright

== Events ==
=== February ===
- 6 February – George VI dies and is succeeded by Elizabeth II as Queen of New Zealand

== Arts and literature ==
See 1952 in art, 1952 in literature, Category:1952 books

=== Music ===
See: 1952 in music

=== Radio ===
See: Public broadcasting in New Zealand

=== Film ===
- Broken Barrier

See: Category:1952 film awards, 1952 in film, List of New Zealand feature films, Cinema of New Zealand, Category:1952 films

== Sport ==
=== Athletics ===
- Jack Clarke wins his second national title in the men's marathon, clocking 2:38:42 on 1 March in Wanganui.

=== Chess ===
- The 59th National Chess Championship was held in Napier, and was won by Ortvin Sarapu of Christchurch (his first title).

=== Cricket ===
Various Tours, New Zealand cricket team

=== Horse racing ===
==== Harness racing ====
- New Zealand Trotting Cup – Mobile Globe
- Auckland Trotting Cup – Soangetaha (2nd win)

=== Lawn bowls ===
The national outdoor lawn bowls championships are held in Dunedin.

- Men's singles champion – Frank Livingstone (Onehunga Bowling Club)
- Men's pair champions – R.K. Aitchison, E. Ravenwood (skip) (North-East Valley Bowling Club)
- Men's fours champions – N.M. Johnston, W.J. Ashton, M.J. Squire, K.S. Ewing (skip) (Stratford Bowling Club)

=== Olympic Games ===
==== Summer Olympics ====
Gold	Silver	Bronze	Total
1	0	2	3

==== Winter Olympics ====
Gold	Silver	Bronze	Total
0	0	0	0

- New Zealand sends a team to the Winter Olympics for the first time.

=== Soccer ===
- The Chatham Cup was shared by the finalists North Shore United and Western (Christchurch) after the extra time score (1–1) and all criteria for deciding a winner at that time were equal.
- The national men's soccer team toured to the Pacific, playing 10 matches, 5 of which were internationals:
  - 31 August, Suva: NZ 1 – 0 Suva
  - 3 September, Suva: NZ 8 – 3 Southern Districts
  - 7 September, Suva: NZ 2 – 0 Fiji
  - 9 September, Lautoka: NZ 0 – 0 Lautoka
  - 11 September, Lautoka: NZ 5 – 0 Northern Districts
  - 14 September, Lautoka: NZ 9 – 0 Fiji
  - 16 September, Suva: NZ 5 – 2 Fiji
  - 21 September, Papeete: NZ 2 – 2 Tahiti
  - 25 September, Fautaua: NZ 7 – 1 Chinese Selection
  - 28 September, Papeete NZ 5 – 3 Tahiti
- Provincial league champions:
  - Auckland: Eastern Suburbs AFC
  - Canterbury: Technical OB
  - Hawke's Bay: West End
  - Manawatu: Palmerston North United
  - Nelson: Settlers
  - Northland: Otangarei United
  - Otago: Northern AFC
  - Poverty Bay: Thistle
  - South Canterbury: Thistle
  - Southland: Brigadiers
  - Taranaki: Overseas
  - Waikato: Pukemiro Junction
  - Wairarapa: Masterton B
  - Wanganui: Technical College Old Boys
  - Wellington: Petone

== Births ==
- 12 January: John Walker, athlete.
- 20 January: Carla van Zon, artistic director. (died 2026)
- 4 February: Jenny Shipley Prime Minister.
- 14 February:
  - Les Wilson, field hockey goalkeeper.
  - Vincent Burke, NZ television producer. (died 2022)
- 19 March: Warren Lees, cricket player and coach.
- 22 March: Rod Millen, motor rally driver.
- 7 April: Alan Niven, songwriter, record producer, manager.
- 21 June: Jeremy Coney, cricket captain.
- 25 June: Tim Finn, singer, songwriter and musician.
- 20 July: Ian Ferguson, kayaker.
- 8 August: Sandra Lee-Vercoe, politician and diplomat.
- 2 September: Chris Knox, singer-songwriter.
- 8 September: Graham Mourie, rugby player.
- 14 September: Neil McLeod, field hockey player.
- 3 October: Gary Troup, cricketer.
- 20 October: Michael Houstoun, concert pianist.
- 31 December: Vaughan Jones, mathematician. (died 2020)
- John Badcock, painter.
- Sue Bradford, politician.
- Stevan Eldred-Grigg, writer and historian.
- (in England): David Fletcher, cartoonist.
- Tame Iti, activist.
- Linda Jones (jockey), thoroughbred horse racing jockey
- Sukhi Turner, Mayor of Dunedin.
- Marilyn Waring, feminist academic and politician.

== Deaths ==
- 29 April: Adam Hamilton, politician.
- 1 May: Hon. Thomas Otto Bishop MLC, politician.
- 6 May: Sir Oswald Birley, painter (in England).
- 5 August:John Robertson, politician.
- 13 August: Frederick de Jersey Clere, architect.
- 20 August: Lionel Terry, convicted murderer, white supremacist.
- 24 August: Alexander Harris, politician
- 17 September Carl Axel Björk, whaler, goldminer and character.
- 12 October: Te Puea Herangi, Māori leader.
- 17 November: Ben Roberts, New Zealand Labour MP
- 22 November: Ted Morgan, New Zealand boxer.
- 27 November: Bill Parry, politician.

== See also ==
- List of years in New Zealand
- Timeline of New Zealand history
- History of New Zealand
- Military history of New Zealand
- Timeline of the New Zealand environment
- Timeline of New Zealand's links with Antarctica
