= 1948 in New Zealand =

- Decades: 1920s; 1930s; 1940s; 1950s; 1960s
- See also: History of New Zealand; List of years in New Zealand; Timeline of New Zealand history

The following lists events that happened during 1948 in New Zealand.

== Population ==
- Estimated population as of 31 December: 1,853,900.
- Increase since 31 December 1947: 36,400 (2.00%).
- Males per 100 females: 100.5.

== Incumbents ==
=== Regal and viceregal ===
- Head of State – George VI
- Governor-General – Lieutenant-General The Lord Freyberg VC GCMG KCB KBE DSO

=== Government ===
The 28th New Zealand Parliament continued, with the Labour Party in government.

- Speaker of the House – Robert McKeen (Labour)
- Prime Minister – Peter Fraser
- Minister of Finance – Walter Nash
- Minister of Foreign Affairs – Peter Fraser
- Attorney-General – Rex Mason
- Chief Justice – Sir Humphrey O'Leary

=== Parliamentary opposition ===
- Leader of the Opposition – Sidney Holland (National Party).

=== Main centre leaders ===
- Mayor of Auckland – John Allum
- Mayor of Hamilton – Harold Caro
- Mayor of Wellington – Will Appleton
- Mayor of Christchurch – Ernest Andrews
- Mayor of Dunedin – Donald Cameron

== Events ==
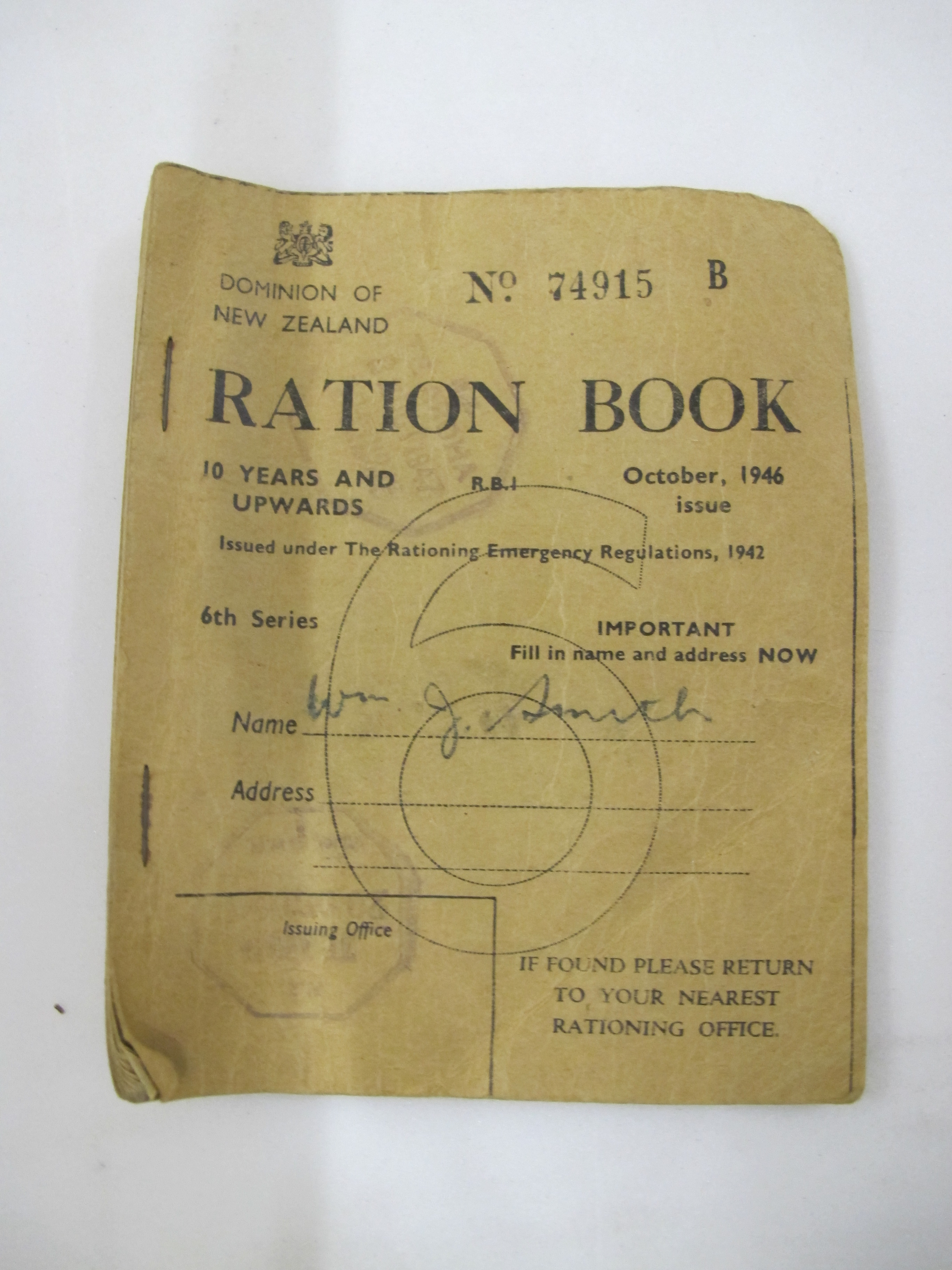
New Zealand ration book

- 31 May – Tea rationing, introduced in June 1942, is abolished.
- 27 August – Sugar rationing, introduced in April 1942, is abolished.
- 6 September – New Zealand citizenship is established. Before this date, New Zealand residents were British citizens or subjects.
- 27 September – Meat rationing, introduced in March 1944, is abolished. Butter remains the sole food product still under rationing.
- 20 November – Two takahē are discovered after being declared extinct for 50 years.
- The Marlborough Press, which was founded in 1860, is taken over by The Marlborough Express.
- Italy establishes a consulate in Wellington.

== Arts and literature ==
See 1948 in art, 1948 in literature

=== Music ===
See: 1948 in music

=== Radio ===
See: Public broadcasting in New Zealand

=== Film ===
See: Category:1948 film awards, 1948 in film, List of New Zealand feature films, Cinema of New Zealand, Category:1948 films

== Sport ==
=== Archery ===
The national championships are held at a single venue for the first time replacing the previous postal shoot.

National champions

- Open Men – H. Butel (Dunedin)
- Open Women – Doreen Johnston (Dunedin)

=== Athletics ===
- Jack Clarke wins the national title in the men's marathon, clocking 2:44:06 in Dunedin.

=== Basketball ===
- Interpovincial Champions: Men – Palmerston North
- Interpovincial Champions: Women – Palmerston North

=== Chess ===
- The 55th National Chess Championship was held in Dunedin, and was won by R.G. Wade of Wellington (his 3rd win).

=== Horse racing ===
==== Harness racing ====
- New Zealand Trotting Cup – Highland Fling (2nd win)
- Auckland Trotting Cup – Captain Sandy

=== Lawn bowls ===
The national outdoor lawn bowls championships are held in Dunedin.

- Men's singles champion – S. Marriott (Opawa Bowling Club)
- Men's pair champions – M.A. Marinovich, S. Garelja (skip) (Oratia Bowling Club)
- Men's fours champions – J.W.T. Macklow, Frank Livingstone, Alec Robertson, J.H. Mingins (skip) (Onehunga Bowling Club)

=== Olympic Games ===
| Gold | Silver | Bronze | Total |
|---|---|---|---|
| 0 | 0 | 0 | 0 |

- New Zealand is represented by seven competitors in athletics, boxing, cycling, swimming and weightlifting. There are no medal successes.

=== Rugby union ===
Category:Rugby union in New Zealand, Category:All Blacks

- Ranfurly Shield

=== Rugby league ===
New Zealand national rugby league team

=== Shooting ===
- Ballinger Belt – William Masefield (Blenheim)

=== Soccer ===
- The Chatham Cup is won by Technical Old Boys of Christchurch who beat Waterside of Wellington 2–0 in the final.
- An Australian side toured New Zealand, playing four internationals:
  - 14 August, Wellington: NZ 0–6 Australia
  - 28 August, Christchurch: NZ 0–7 Australia
  - 4 September, Wellington: NZ 0–4 Australia
  - 11 September, Auckland: NZ 1–8 Australia
- Provincial league champions:
  - Auckland: Eastern Suburbs
  - Canterbury: Western
  - Hawke's Bay: Napier HSOB
  - Nelson: Nelson United
  - Otago: Mosgiel
  - South Canterbury: Fisherman
  - Southland: Invercargill United
  - Taranaki: Stratford
  - Waikato: Rotowaro
  - Wanganui: Wanganui Athletic
  - Wellington: Waterside

== Births ==
- 6 January: Dayle Hadlee, cricketer.
- 16 January: Dalvanius Prime, entertainer.
- 17 January: Billy T. James, comedian.
- 7 February: Richard Prebble, politician.
- 27 February: Michael Baigent, author and conspiracy theorist.
- 2 April (in Scotland): Sam Malcolmson, soccer player.
- 25 May: Mac Price, diplomat.
- 3 July: Richard Worth, politician.
- 22 July: Kevin Ryan, long-distance runner.
- 29 July: John Clarke, actor, best known in New Zealand for Fred Dagg.
- 6 September: Kevin Towns, field hockey player and coach.
- 1 October: Peter Blake, yachtsman.
- 2 October: Robert Anderson, cricketer.
- 24 October: Ray Ahipene-Mercer, musician, politician.
- 4 November: Alexis Hunter, painter.
- 13 November: Lockwood Smith, politician.
- 15 November: David Caygill, politician.
- Sue Kedgley, politician.
- Bruce Lynch, musician.
- Grahame Sydney, painter.
- Sue Wood, politician.

== Deaths ==
- 16 May: John Gordon Eliott, former Reform MP
- 16 June: Lavinia Jane Kelsey, kindergarten founder and teacher
- 25 September: George Davidson, olympic sprinter.
- 9 October: Edmund Anscombe, architect.
- 20 December: Fanny Irvine-Smith, teacher and writer
- 21 December: Fred Bartram, former Labour MP

== See also ==
- History of New Zealand
- List of years in New Zealand
- Military history of New Zealand
- Timeline of New Zealand history
- Timeline of New Zealand's links with Antarctica
- Timeline of the New Zealand environment

For world events and topics in 1948 not specifically related to New Zealand see: 1948
