= 1950 in New Zealand =

- Decades: 1930s; 1940s; 1950s; 1960s; 1970s
- See also: History of New Zealand; List of years in New Zealand; Timeline of New Zealand history

The following lists events that happened during 1950 in New Zealand.

New Zealand entered into the Korean War – a total of 4,700 New Zealanders served in Korea. New Zealand also was involved in the Malayan Emergency.

The New Zealand Legislative Council was abolished, see Suicide squad.

The 1950 British Empire Games was held in Auckland.

Wool prices boomed, tripling during the year, due to U.S. stockpiling as a reaction to the Korean war. This was offset somewhat by increases in the prices of other (imported) commodities, but began the biggest economic boom of the 20th century in New Zealand.

== Population ==
- Estimated population as of 31 December: 1,927,700.
- Increase since 31 December 1949: 35,600 (1.88%).
- Males per 100 females: 100.7.

== Incumbents ==
=== Regal and viceregal ===
- Head of State – George VI
- Governor-General – Lieutenant-General The Lord Freyberg VC GCMG KCB KBE DSO

=== Government ===
The 29th New Zealand Parliament continued. In power was the newly elected National government under Sidney Holland of the National Party.

- Speaker of the House – Robert McKeen then Mathew Oram
- Prime Minister – Sidney Holland
- Deputy Prime Minister – Keith Holyoake
- Minister of Finance – Sidney Holland
- Minister of Foreign Affairs – Frederick Doidge
- Attorney-General – Clifton Webb
- Chief Justice – Sir Humphrey O'Leary

=== Parliamentary opposition ===
- Leader of the Opposition – Peter Fraser (Labour) until his death on 5 August, then vacant until January 1951.

=== Main centre leaders ===
- Mayor of Auckland – John Allum
- Mayor of Hamilton – Harold Caro
- Mayor of Wellington – Will Appleton then Robert Macalister
- Mayor of Christchurch – Ernest Andrews then Robert M. Macfarlane
- Mayor of Dunedin – Donald Cameron then Leonard Morton Wright

== Events ==
- 4 January – Start of the 4th British Empire Games in Auckland.
- 4 June – Butter rationing, introduced in October 1943, is abolished.

== Arts and literature ==
See 1950 in art, 1950 in literature

=== Music ===
See: 1950 in music

=== Radio ===
See: Public broadcasting in New Zealand

=== Film ===
See: Category:1950 film awards, 1950 in film, List of New Zealand feature films, Cinema of New Zealand, Category:1950 films

== Sport ==
=== Athletics ===
- George Bromley wins his third national title in the men's marathon, clocking 2:55:07 in Napier.

=== British Empire Games ===
Gold	Silver	Bronze	Total
10	22	21	53

=== Chess ===
- The 57th National Chess Championship was held in Auckland, and was won by P. Allerhand of Wellington (his second win).

=== Horse racing ===
==== Harness racing ====
- New Zealand Trotting Cup – Chamfer
- Auckland Trotting Cup – Victory Globe

=== Lawn bowls ===
The national outdoor lawn bowls championships are held in Christchurch.

- Men's singles champion – L.J. Edwards (Balclutha Bowling Club)
- Men's pair champions – H. Hurst, E. Elwood (skip) (Christchurch RSA Bowling Club)
- Men's fours champions – E.H. Crowley, J.H. Meikle, V.F. Hurlstone, G.A. Crowley (skip) (Tolaga Bay Bowling Club)

=== Rugby union ===
The British and Irish Lions, captained by Karl Mullen, toured the country, losing three tests to the All Blacks and drawing one.

=== Rugby league ===
New Zealand national rugby league team

=== Soccer ===
- The Chatham Cup is won by Eden who beat Technical Old Boys 3–2 after extra time in the final.
- Provincial league champions:
  - Auckland: Eastern Suburbs AFC
  - Canterbury: Technical OB
  - Hawke's Bay: Watersiders
  - Nelson: Woodbourne
  - Otago: Northern AFC
  - South Canterbury: Northern Hearts
  - Southland: Brigadiers
  - Taranaki: City
  - Waikato: Claudelands Rovers
  - Wanganui: Wanganui Athletic
  - Wellington: Seatoun AFC

== Births ==
- 3 January: Robert Oliver, road and track cyclist
- 5 January: Matt Robson, politician
- 8 February: Peter Wells, New Zealand writer, filmmaker (d. 2019)
- 26 February: Helen Clark, Prime Minister of New Zealand, 1999–2008
- 6 April: Muriel Newman, politician
- 22 April: Lee Tamahori, film director (d. 2025)
- 29 April: Paul Holmes, radio and television broadcaster (d. 2013)
- 2 May: Peter Gilbert, boxer (d. 1976)
- 24 May: Allison Durbin, singer
- 13 June: Pete Hodgson, politician
- 24 June: David Aspin, wrestler
- 3 July: Ewen Chatfield, cricketer
- 28 July: Pip Cheshire, architect (d. 2026)
- 1 August: John Britten, engineer and inventor (d. 1995)
- 12 August: Ken Shirley, politician
- 26 September: Andy Haden, rugby player (d. 2020)
- 9 November: Parekura Horomia, politician (d. 2013)
- 10 December: Simon Owen, golfer
- 13 December: Ruth Richardson, politician
- (in Hungary): George Baloghy, painter
- David Benson-Pope, politician
- Godwin Bradbeer, painter
- Alan Duff, writer
- Stephen Franks, politician and political commentator
- Greg McGee, screenwriter and playwright
- John McKinnon, diplomat and public servant
- Judith Mayhew, lawyer and academic
- Stephen Parke, physicist
- Kura Te Waru Rewiri, painter

== Deaths ==
- 23 March: Paddy Webb, politician
- 14 July: Āpirana Ngata, Māori politician and lawyer.
- 23 August: Abraham Wachner, 35th Mayor of Invercargill.
- 19 November: Tom Brindle, politician and activist
- 11 December: Leslie Comrie, New Zealand astronomer and computing pioneer.
- 12 December: Peter Fraser, 24th Prime Minister of New Zealand.
- William Twigg-Smith, painter (in Hawaii).

== See also ==
- List of years in New Zealand
- Timeline of New Zealand history
- History of New Zealand
- Military history of New Zealand
- Timeline of the New Zealand environment
- Timeline of New Zealand's links with Antarctica

For world events and topics in 1950 not specifically related to New Zealand see: 1950
