= 1953 in New Zealand =

- Decades: 1930s; 1940s; 1950s; 1960s; 1970s
- See also: History of New Zealand; List of years in New Zealand; Timeline of New Zealand history

The following lists events that happened during 1953 in New Zealand.

== Population ==
- Estimated population as of 31 December: 2,074,700.
- Increase since 31 December 1952: 50,100 (2.47%).
- Males per 100 females: 101.1.

== Incumbents ==
=== Regal and viceregal ===
- Head of State – Elizabeth II, Queen of New Zealand, from 6 February 1952
- Governor-General – Lieutenant-General The Lord Norrie GCMG GCVO CB DSO MC, from 1952-1957

=== Government ===
The 30th New Zealand Parliament continued. The National Party was in its second term in office under Sidney Holland.

- Speaker of the House – Matthew Oram from 1950 to 1957
- Prime Minister – Sidney Holland from 13 December 1949 to 20 September 1957.
- Deputy Prime Minister – Keith Holyoake from 13 December 1949 to 20 September 1957.
- Minister of Finance – Sidney Holland
- Minister of Foreign Affairs – Clifton Webb from 19 September 1951 to 26 November 1954
- Chief Justice — Sir Humphrey O'Leary (until 16 October), Sir Harold Barrowclough (from 17 November)

=== Parliamentary opposition ===
- Leader of the Opposition – Walter Nash (Labour).

=== Main centre leaders ===
- Mayor of Auckland – John Luxford from 1953–1956
- Mayor of Hamilton – Harold David Caro (from 1938 until his defeat in November) then Roderick Braithwaite (until 1959)
- Mayor of Wellington – Robert Macalister from 1950–1956
- Mayor of Christchurch – Robert M. Macfarlane from 1938–1941 and again from 1950–1958
- Mayor of Dunedin – Leonard Morton Wright from 1950–1959

== Events ==
- 6 January: Godfrey Bowen sets a world sheep shearing record, shearing 456 sheep in nine hours.
- 10 January: The Social Credit Political League is formed from the earlier Social Credit Association.
- 29 May – Edmund Hillary and Tenzing Norgay reach the summit of Mount Everest, the first known time this has been done. Hillary is knighted the following day.
- 2 June – Elizabeth II crowned as Queen of New Zealand at Westminster Abbey in London
- 23 December – The newly crowned Elizabeth II arrives in New Zealand for a royal tour scheduled to last until 30 January 1954. It is estimated that three in four New Zealanders would make an effort to see her during the tour.
- 24 December – Tangiwai disaster: A railway bridge collapses at Tangiwai in the central North Island, sending a fully loaded passenger train into the Whangaehu River, killing 151 passengers on board. The disaster remains New Zealand's worst rail accident.
- Police horses are retired from New Zealand.

== Arts and literature ==
See 1953 in art, 1953 in literature, Category:1953 books

=== Radio ===
See: Public broadcasting in New Zealand

=== Film ===
See: Category:1953 film awards, 1953 in film, List of New Zealand feature films, Cinema of New Zealand, Category:1953 films

== Sport ==
=== Athletics ===
- Arthur Lydiard wins his first national title in the men's marathon, clocking 2:41:29.8 in Dunedin.

=== Chess ===
- The 60th National Chess Championship was held in Timaru, and was won by Ortvin Sarapu of Auckland (his second title).

=== Horse racing ===
==== Harness racing ====
- New Zealand Trotting Cup – Adorian
- Auckland Trotting Cup – Thelma Globe

=== Lawn bowls ===
The national outdoor lawn bowls championships are held in Auckland.

- Men's singles champion – R. McMaster (Stanley Bowling Club)
- Men's pair champions – J.F. Benson, Ted Pilkington (skip) (Balmoral Bowling Club)
- Men's fours champions – W.G. Thornally, C.B. Shine, N.A. Fletcher, N. Orange (skip) (Balmoral Bowling Club)

=== Shooting ===
- Ballinger Belt – Maurie Gordon (Okawa)

=== Soccer ===
- The Chatham Cup is won by Eastern Suburbs (of Auckland) who beat Northern (of Dunedin) 4–3 in the final.
- Provincial league champions:
  - Auckland: Eastern Suburbs AFC
  - Bay of Plenty: Mangakino Utd
  - Canterbury: Western
  - Hawke's Bay: Hastings Wanderers
  - Manawatu: Palmerston North United
  - Nelson: Woodbourne
  - Northland: Otangarei United
  - Otago: Northern
  - Poverty Bay: Eastern Union
  - South Canterbury: Northern Hearts
  - Southland: Brigadiers, Thistle (shared)
  - Taranaki: City
  - Waikato: Huntly Thistle
  - Wairarapa: Carterton
  - Wanganui: New Settlers
  - Wellington: Wellington Marist

== Births ==
- 3 February: Steve Maharey, politician.
- 5 February: Deborah Coddington, journalist and politician.
- 17 February: Steve Millen, motor racing driver.
- 23 March: Denis Aberhart, cricket player and coach.
- 25 March: Paul Ballinger, long-distance runner
- 25 May: John Z. Robinson, artist, printmaker and jewelmaker.
- 14 June: Janet Mackey, politician.
- 22 June: Phil Goff, politician.
- 5 September: Murray Mexted, rugby player and commentator.
- 7 September: Marc Hunter, musician.
- 9 September: Edmond ("Sonny") Schmidt, bodybuilder.
- 12 September: Ramesh Patel, field hockey player.
- 2 October: Colin Wallace, cricketer
- 6 November: Brian McKechnie, rugby player and cricketer.
- 19 December: Paul McEwan, cricketer.
- Jonathan Dennis, film historian.
- Bill Ralston, journalist

== Deaths ==
- 20 January: Benjamin Robbins MLC; Mayor of Hawera, Tauranga (born 1857)
- 29 July: Richard Pearse airplane pioneer (born 1877).
- 16 October: Humphrey O'Leary, 7th Chief Justice of New Zealand.

== See also ==
- List of years in New Zealand
- Timeline of New Zealand history
- History of New Zealand
- Military history of New Zealand
- Timeline of the New Zealand environment
- Timeline of New Zealand's links with Antarctica
