= 1951 in New Zealand =

- Decades: 1930s; 1940s; 1950s; 1960s; 1970s
- See also: History of New Zealand; List of years in New Zealand; Timeline of New Zealand history

The following lists events that happened during 1951 in New Zealand.

The year was dominated by the 1951 New Zealand waterfront dispute.

New Zealand entered a mutual defence pact with the United States and Australia – ANZUS.

== Population ==
A New Zealand census was held in 1951.

| | Male | Female | Total |
| Usually resident population | 967,647 (50.1%) | 962,835 (49.9%) | 1,930,482 |
| Overseas Visitors | 6,297 | 2,661 | 8,958 |
| Total | 973,968 | 965,505 | 1,939,473 |

- Estimated population as of 31 December: 1,970,500.
- Increase since 31 December 1950: 42,800 (2.22%).
- Males per 100 females: 100.9.

== Incumbents ==
=== Regal and viceregal ===
- Head of State – George VI
- Governor-General – Lieutenant-General The Lord Freyberg VC GCMG KCB KBE DSO

=== Government ===
The 29th New Zealand Parliament continued. In power was the National government under Sidney Holland. The general election saw the governing National Party re-elected with a twenty-seat margin, a substantial improvement on the twelve-seat margin it previously held.

The New Zealand Legislative Council voted itself out of existence, making New Zealand a unicameral democracy.

- Speaker of the House – Mathew Oram
- Prime Minister – Sidney Holland
- Deputy Prime Minister – Keith Holyoake
- Minister of Finance – Sidney Holland
- Minister of Foreign Affairs – Frederick Doidge then Clifton Webb
- Chief Justice — Sir Humphrey O'Leary

=== Parliamentary opposition ===
- Leader of the Opposition – Vacant until 17 January, then Walter Nash (Labour).

=== Main centre leaders ===
- Mayor of Auckland – John Allum
- Mayor of Hamilton – Harold Caro
- Mayor of Wellington – Robert Macalister
- Mayor of Christchurch – Robert Macfarlane
- Mayor of Dunedin – Len Wright

== Events ==
- The Official Secrets Act is passed.
- 15 February: The start of the 151 day "1951 Waterfront dispute".
- 1 September: Signing of the ANZUS treaty.

== Arts and literature ==
See 1951 in art, 1951 in literature, Category:1951 books

=== Music ===
See: 1951 in music

=== Radio and television ===
- Experimental television broadcasts had been allowed from 1951 (as long as they included nothing that could be classed as 'entertainment').

See: Public broadcasting in New Zealand

=== Film ===
See: Category:1951 film awards, 1951 in film, List of New Zealand feature films, Cinema of New Zealand, Category:1951 films

== Sport ==
=== Athletics ===
- George Bromley wins his fourth national title in the men's marathon, clocking 2:48:16 on 3 March in Wellington.

=== Chess ===
- The 58th National Chess Championship was held in Christchurch, and was won by D.I. Lynch of Hastings.

=== Horse racing ===
==== Harness racing ====
- New Zealand Trotting Cup – Van Dieman
- Auckland Trotting Cup – Soangetaha

=== Lawn bowls ===
The national outdoor lawn bowls championships are held in Wellington.

- Men's singles champion – A. Graham (Johnsonville Bowling Club)
- Men's pair champions – G.G. Littlejohn, A.J. Webster (skip) (Hutt Bowling Club)
- Men's fours champions – A.J. Murdoch, H.L. Rule, A. Rivers, Pete Skoglund (skip) (Otahuhu Bowling Club)

=== Rugby league ===
- The 1951 French rugby league tour of Australia and New Zealand is conducted

=== Rugby union ===
- Bledisloe Cup: New Zealand beat Australia in all three tests, winning back the cup.
- Ranfurly Shield: North Auckland defended the shield against Bay of Plenty (16–12) and Thames Valley (19–6) before losing it to Waikato (3–6). Waikato then defended successfully against Auckland (14–6), Bay of Plenty (32–10), Taranaki (21–12) and Wanganui (14–0).

=== Shooting ===
- Ballinger Belt – Maurie Gordon (Okawa)

=== Soccer ===
- The New Zealand national soccer team played 9 matches, 6 of them internationals:
  - 11 August, Wellington: NZ 3 – 1 Victoria (Australia)
  - 10 September, Auckland: NZ 2 – 0 Auckland
  - 15 September, Suva: NZ 6 – 1 Suva
  - 19 September, Nouméa: NZ 0 – 2 New Caledonia
  - 22 September, Nouméa: NZ 6 – 4 New Caledonia
  - 24 September, Nouméa: NZ 0 – 2 New Caledonia
  - 30 September, Nouméa: NZ 3 – 1 New Caledonia
  - 4 October, Nouméa: NZ 9 – 0 New Hebrides
  - 7 October, Suva: NZ 6 – 4 Fiji
- The Chatham Cup is won by Eastern Suburbs of Auckland who beat Northern of Dunedin 5— 1in the final.
- Provincial league champions:
  - Auckland: Eastern Suburbs AFC
  - Buller: Millerton Thistle
  - Canterbury: Technical OB
  - Hawke's Bay: Napier HSOB
  - Manawatu: St Andrews
  - Nelson: Thistle
  - Northland: Kamo Swifts
  - Otago: Northern AFC
  - Poverty Bay: Thistle
  - South Canterbury: Northern Hearts
  - Southland: Brigadiers
  - Taranaki: Old Boys
  - Waikato: Claudelands Rovers, Rotowaro (shared)
  - Wanganui: Technical College Old Boys
  - Wellington: Seatoun AFC
  - West Coast: Runanga

== Births ==
- 8 January: Garry Moore, mayor of Christchurch.
- 24 January Dianne Macaskill, former Chief Archivist of Archives New Zealand
- 21 February: John Parker, cricketer.
- 6 March: Maurice Williamson, politician, cabinet minister
- 29 March: Geoff Howarth, cricketer.
- 22 June: Todd Hunter, musician.
- 3 July: Richard Hadlee, cricketer.
- 21 July: (in Fiji) Bernie Fraser, rugby player.
- 14 August: Vern Hanaray, road cyclist.
- 14 September: Karen Plummer, cricketer.
- 20 September: Stephen Boock, cricketer.
- 27 October: Rick Barker, politician.
- 16 November: Andy Dalton, rugby player.
- 21 November: Joe Karam, rugby union and rugby league player, lobbyist.
- 8 December: Paul Brydon, road and track cyclist.
- 9 December: Tuariki Delamere, politician.
- 20 December: Paul Swain, politician
- Geoff Cochrane, poet and novelist (died 2022)
- Marty Johnstone, drug trafficker ('Mr Asia')
- Stephen Tindall, business leader

== Deaths ==
- 9 January: William "Massa" Johnston, rugby and rugby league player.
- 16 July: Charles Tilleard Natusch, architect
- 4 November: Oscar Natzka, opera singer.
- 1 December: Te Rangi Hīroa, Māori leader (born 1877)

== See also ==
- List of years in New Zealand
- Timeline of New Zealand history
- History of New Zealand
- Military history of New Zealand
- Timeline of the New Zealand environment
- Timeline of New Zealand's links with Antarctica
