= 1947 in New Zealand =

- Decades: 1920s; 1930s; 1940s; 1950s; 1960s
- See also: History of New Zealand; List of years in New Zealand; Timeline of New Zealand history

The following lists events that happened during 1947 in New Zealand.

== Population ==
- Estimated population as of 31 December: 1,817,500.
- Increase since 31 December 1946: 36,300 (2.04%).
- Males per 100 females: 100.3.

== Incumbents ==
=== Regal and viceregal ===
- Head of State – George VI
- Governor-General – Lieutenant-General The Lord Freyberg VC GCMG KCB KBE DSO

=== Government ===
The 28th New Zealand Parliament continued, with the Labour Party in government.

- Speaker of the House – Robert McKeen (Labour)
- Prime Minister – Peter Fraser
- Minister of Finance – Walter Nash
- Minister of Foreign Affairs – Peter Fraser
- Attorney-General – Rex Mason
- Chief Justice – Sir Humphrey O'Leary

=== Parliamentary opposition ===
- Leader of the Opposition – Sidney Holland (National Party).

=== Main centre leaders ===
- Mayor of Auckland – John Allum
- Mayor of Hamilton – Harold Caro
- Mayor of Wellington – Will Appleton
- Mayor of Christchurch – Ernest Andrews
- Mayor of Dunedin – Donald Cameron

== Events ==
- 19 January –The TSMV Wanganella, completing her first trans-tasman crossing since World War II, runs aground on Barrett Reef at the entrance to Wellington Harbour. All 400 passengers are safely evacuated. The ship is refloated on 6 February but is out of service for a further 22 months.
- 6 February – First annual Waitangi Day ceremony held by New Zealand Navy in grounds of Treaty house, Waitangi.
- 6 March – The New Zealand Symphony Orchestra performs for the first time
- 26 March – A magnitude 7.1 earthquake strikes east of Gisborne, causing a tsunami with a maximum run-up height of 10 metres.
- 1–29 April – A series of non-violent mutinies occur aboard ships and bases of the Royal New Zealand Navy
- 4 April – Horahora Power Station is decommissioned as the filling of Lake Karapiro floods the station.
- 21 April – The first generator at Karapiro Power Station is commissioned.
- 26 March – Another magnitude 7.1 earthquake strikes east of Gisborne, causing a tsunami with a maximum run-up height of 6 metres.
- 18 November – 41 people die in a fire in the Ballantyne's department store in Christchurch.
- 25 November – The Statute of Westminster Adoption Act 1947 was passed making New Zealand politically independent from the United Kingdom
- 1 December – Clothing rationing, introduced in May 1942, is abolished.

== Arts and literature ==
See 1947 in art, 1947 in literature

=== Music ===
See: 1947 in music

=== Radio ===
See: Public broadcasting in New Zealand

=== Film ===
See: Category:1947 film awards, 1947 in film, List of New Zealand feature films, Cinema of New Zealand, Category:1947 films

== Sport ==
=== Archery ===
National champions (Postal Shoot)

- Open Men – W. Burton (Gisborne)
- Open Women – G. Norris (Dunedin)

=== Athletics ===
- George Bromley wins his first national title in the men's marathon, clocking 2:58:54 in Auckland.

=== Basketball ===
The first interprovincial championship for women is held.

==== Interprovincial champions ====
- Men – Auckland
- Women – Wellington

=== Chess ===
- The 54th National Chess Championship was held in Palmerston North, and was won by T. Lepviikman of Wellington (his 2nd win).

=== Horse racing ===
==== Harness racing ====
- New Zealand Trotting Cup – Highland Fling
- Auckland Trotting Cup – Single Direct

=== Lawn bowls ===
The national outdoor lawn bowls championships are held in Wellington.

- Men's singles champion – S. Vella (Onehunga Bowling Club)
- Men's pair champions – W.R. Hawkins, Phil Exelby (skip) (Frankton Bowling Club)
- Men's fours champions – E.H. Crowley, E. Crowley, V.F. Hurlstone, G.A. Crowley (skip) (Tolaga Bay Bowling Club)

=== Rugby league ===
- New Zealand national rugby league team beat Wales 28-20

=== Soccer ===
- A South African team visited New Zealand and played four internationals:
  - 28 June, Christchurch: NZ 5–6 South Africa
  - 5 July, Dunedin: NZ 0–6 South Africa
  - 12 July, Wellington: NZ 3–8 South Africa
  - 19 July, Auckland: NZ 1–4 South Africa
- The Chatham Cup is won by Waterside of Wellington who beat Technical Old Boys of Christchurch 2–1 in the final.
- Provincial league champions:
  - Auckland: North Shore United
  - Canterbury: Western
  - Hawke's Bay: Napier HSOB
  - Nelson: Nelson United
  - Otago: Mosgiel AFC
  - South Canterbury: Northern Hearts
  - Southland: Invercargill Thistle
  - Taranaki: Albion
  - Waikato: Claudelands Rovers
  - Wanganui: Technical College Old Boys
  - Wellington: Wellington Marist

== Births ==
- 8 January: Luke Williams, wrestler
- 16 January: Gavan Herlihy, politician.
- 19 February: Tim Shadbolt, politician. (died 2026)
- 9 March
  - Keri Hulme, writer. (died 2021)
  - John Lister, golfer.
- 6 May: Alan Dale, actor.
- 6 May (in United Kingdom): Carl Doy, musician and composer.
- 6 May: Andrew Roberts, cricketer. (died 1989)
- 20 May: Margaret Wilson, politician.
- 27 May: Glenn Turner, cricketer.
- 1 June: Gaylene Preston, filmmaker
- 6 June: Patrick Power, tenor.
- 22 June: Murray Webb, cricketer and caricature artist.
- 27 August: John Morrison, cricketer.
- 2 September: Jim Richards, motor racing driver.
- 13 September: Annette King, politician.
- 14 September (in United Kingdom): Sam Neill, actor. (died 2026)
- 22 September: David Trist, cricket player and coach. (died 2025)
- 11 December (in United Kingdom): David McGee, lawyer and public servant (died 2023)
- 18 December: Marian Hobbs, politician.

- Bill Hammond, painter. (died 2021)
- Michael Wintringham, public servant.

Category:1947 births

== Deaths ==
- 17 January: Kahupāke Rongonui, tribal leader.
- 10 February: Winter Hall, silent movie actor.
- 11 March: Duncan McGregor, rugby player.
- 24 April: Patrick O'Regan, lawyer, politician and judge.
- 13 May: Frances Hodgkins, painter.
- 17 May: George Forbes, 22nd Prime minister of New Zealand.
- 30 June: Robert Frederick Way, trade unionist and activist.
- 21 July: Agnes Fabish, domestic servant, farmer and homemaker.
- 4 December: Margaret Butler, sculptor and artist.
- 6 December: Robert Wright, mayor of Wellington and politician.

== See also ==
- History of New Zealand
- List of years in New Zealand
- Military history of New Zealand
- Timeline of New Zealand history
- Timeline of New Zealand's links with Antarctica
- Timeline of the New Zealand environment
