= 1954 in New Zealand =

- Decades: 1930s; 1940s; 1950s; 1960s; 1970s
- See also: History of New Zealand; List of years in New Zealand; Timeline of New Zealand history

The following lists events that happened during 1954 in New Zealand.

== Population ==
- Estimated population as of 31 December: 2,118,400.
- Increase since 31 December 1953: 43,700 (2.11%).
- Males per 100 females: 101.2.

== Incumbents ==
=== Regal and viceregal ===
- Head of State – Elizabeth II, Queen of New Zealand, from 6 February 1952
- Governor-General – Lieutenant-General The Lord Norrie GCMG GCVO CB DSO MC, from 1952 to 1957

=== Government ===
The 30th New Zealand Parliament expired this year. The National Party was elected to a third term in office under Sidney Holland on 13 November.

- Speaker of the House – Matthew Oram from 1950 to 1957
- Prime Minister – Sidney Holland from 13 December 1949 to 20 September 1957.
- Deputy Prime Minister – Keith Holyoake from 13 December 1949 to 20 September 1957.
- Minister of Finance – Sidney Holland until November, followed by Jack Watts
- Minister of Foreign Affairs – Clifton Webb from 19 September 1951 to 26 November 1954, followed by Tom Macdonald
- Chief Justice — Sir Harold Barrowclough

=== Parliamentary opposition ===
- Leader of the Opposition – Walter Nash (Labour).

=== Main centre leaders ===
- Mayor of Auckland – John Luxford from 1953 to 1956
- Mayor of Hamilton – Roderick Braithwaite from 1953 to 1959
- Mayor of Wellington – Robert Macalister from 1950 to 1956
- Mayor of Christchurch – Robert M. Macfarlane from 1938 to 1941 and again from 1950 to 1958
- Mayor of Dunedin – Leonard Morton Wright from 1950 to 1959

== Events ==
- 12 January – 50,000 people mass in Wellington as Elizabeth II attends the state opening of Parliament.
- 30 January – The Royal tour by Queen Elizabeth II and The Duke of Edinburgh concludes at Bluff as they depart on the SS Gothic.
- 22 May – A Douglas DC-3 crashes near Paraparaumu Airport after its wing hits a house. Three people died.
- 23 June – Teenagers Pauline Parker and Juliet Hulme are arrested for the murder of Parker's mother.
- 20 September – the Mazengarb Report on Moral Delinquency in Children and Adolescents is presented to Parliament.
- 8 November – eighteen-year-old golf amateur Bob Charles causes a sensation by beating a top international field to win the New Zealand Golf Open
- 13 November – the National Party wins re-election at a general election
- Hastings becomes the first town in New Zealand to fluoridate its water supply.

== Arts and literature ==
See 1954 in art, 1954 in literature

=== Music ===
See: 1954 in music

=== Radio ===
- 2 January – First radio episode of It's in the Bag, hosted by Selwyn Toogood

See: Public broadcasting in New Zealand

=== Film ===
- The Seekers

See: Category:1954 film awards, 1954 in film, List of New Zealand feature films, Cinema of New Zealand, Category:1954 films

== Sport ==
=== Athletics ===
- 20 February: Yvette Williams breaks the world long jump record by jumping 20 feet 7 1/2 inches (6.287 metres) at Gisborne.
- Edwin Rye wins his first national title in the men's marathon, clocking 2:35:45 on 6 March in Hamilton, New Zealand.

=== British Empire and Commonwealth Games ===
Gold	Silver	Bronze	Total
7	7	5	19

=== Chess ===
- The 61st National Chess Championship is held in Wellington, and is won by Ortvin Sarapu of Auckland (his third successive title).

=== Horse racing ===
==== Harness racing ====
- New Zealand Trotting Cup – Johnny Globe
- Auckland Trotting Cup – Caduceus

=== Lawn bowls ===
The national outdoor lawn bowls championships are held in Christchurch.

- Men's singles champion – Robin Andrew (Onehunga Bowling Club)
- Men's pair champions – N.A. McNabb, C.L. Spearman (skip) (Christchurch RSA Bowling Club)
- Men's fours champions – J. Rothwell, H.L. Rule, W. O'Neill, Pete Skoglund (skip) (Otahuhu Bowling Club)

=== Rugby union ===
- The All Blacks played four Test Matches on a tour of Europe:
  - 9 January, Lansdowne Road, Dublin: New Zealand 14 – 3 Ireland
  - 30 January, Twickenham, London: New Zealand 5 – 0 England
  - 13 February, Murrayfield, Edinburgh New Zealand 3 – 0 Scotland
  - 27 February, Stade Colombes, Paris: New Zealand 0 – 3 France

=== Soccer ===
- The national men's team undertook a 10-match tour of Australia, which included 3 internationals. They played one warm-up match prior to the tour.
  - 31 July, Wellington: NZ 6 – 0 Wellington
  - 3 August, Adelaide: NZ 3 – 2 South Australia
  - 7 August, Adelaide: NZ 3 – 1 Australian XI
  - 11 August, Melbourne: NZ 1 – 2 Victoria
  - 14 August, Melbourne: NZ 2 – 1 Australia
  - 18 August, Granville: NZ 0 – 3 Granville
  - 21 August, Sydney: NZ 4 – 1 New South Wales Benge (2), Charlton, Olley
  - 25 August, Brisbane: NZ 2 – 2 Queensland Smith, Steele
  - 28 August, Brisbane: NZ 1 – 4 Australia'
  - 29 August, Newcastle: NZ 1 – 1 Northern Districts Smith
  - 4 September, Sydney: NZ 1 – 4 Australia
  - 5 September, Bulli: NZ 4 – 4 South Coast
- The Chatham Cup is won by Onehunga who beat Western of Christchurch 1–0 in the final.
- Provincial league champions:
  - Auckland: North Shore United
  - Bay of Plenty: Mangakino Utd
  - Buller: Millerton Thistle
  - Canterbury: Western
  - Hawke's Bay: Hastings Wanderers
  - Manawatu: Palmerston North United
  - Nelson: Settlers
  - Northland: Otangarei United
  - Otago: Northern
  - Poverty Bay: Eastern Union
  - South Canterbury: Northern Hearts
  - Southland: Brigadiers
  - Taranaki: Old Boys
  - Waikato: Huntly Thistle
  - Wanganui: New Settlers
  - Wellington: Stop Out

== Births ==
- 1 January: Rawiri Paratene, actor and director
- 17 February: Brian Houston, New Zealand-born Australian pastor.
- 17 March: Peter Dunne, politician
- 30 April: Jane Campion, film director.
- 11 May: Murray Haszard, technology entrepreneur.
- 20 May: Julie Brougham, Olympic equestrian (died 2021)
- 15 June: Larry Ross, motorcycle speedway rider.
- 17 June: Trevor Mallard, politician
- 5 July: John Wright, cricket player and coach
- 22 July: Stu Wilson, rugby union player (died 2025)
- 24 October: Tu Wyllie, politician
- 18 November: Evan Gray, cricketer
- 24 December: Graham Sligo, field hockey player

Category:1954 births

== Deaths ==
- 7 May: Cyril Brownlie, rugby union player.
- 26 May: Frederick Doidge, former cabinet minister and New Zealand High Commissioner (London)
- 1 June: Charles E. Major, politician.
- 5 June: Alexander Stuart, politician
- 1 August: Arthur Stallworthy, politician.
- 7 December: George William Smith, athlete, rugby union and league player.
- John Buckland Wright, engraver.

== See also ==
- List of years in New Zealand
- Timeline of New Zealand history
- History of New Zealand
- Military history of New Zealand
- Timeline of the New Zealand environment
- Timeline of New Zealand's links with Antarctica

For world events and topics in 1954 not specifically related to New Zealand see: 1954
