= 1955 in New Zealand =

- Decades: 1930s; 1940s; 1950s; 1960s; 1970s
- See also: History of New Zealand; List of years in New Zealand; Timeline of New Zealand history

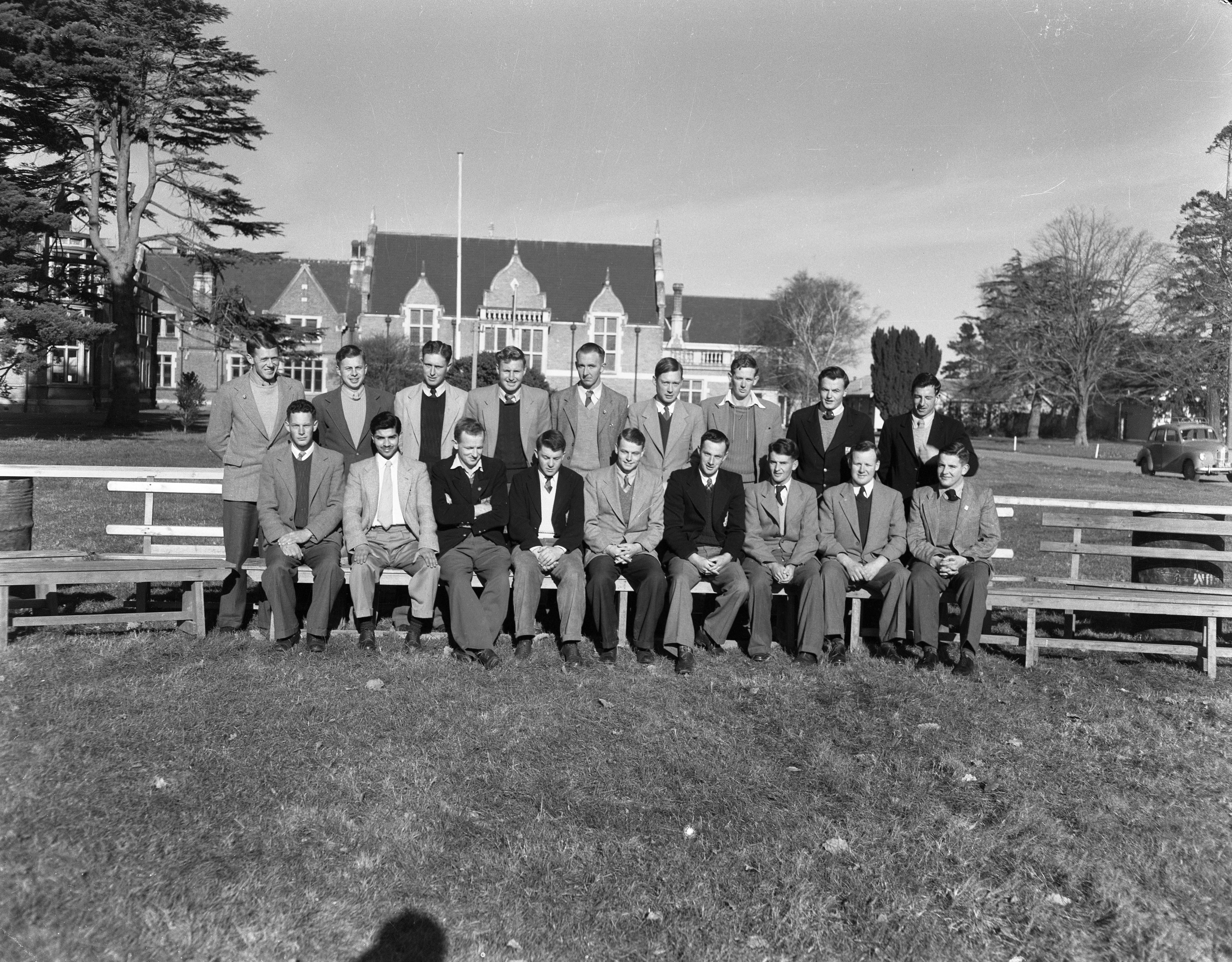
The 1955 Valuation and Farm Management class at Canterbury Agricultural College.

The following lists events that happened during 1955 in New Zealand.

== Population ==
- Estimated population as of 31 December: 2,164,800.
- Increase since 31 December 1954: 46,400 (2.19%).
- Males per 100 females: 101.2.

== Incumbents ==
=== Regal and viceregal ===
- Head of State – Elizabeth II, Queen of New Zealand, from 6 February 1952
- Governor-General – Lieutenant-General The Lord Norrie GCMG GCVO CB DSO MC, from 1952 to 1957

=== Government ===
The 31st New Zealand Parliament continued. In power was the National government under Sidney Holland.

- Speaker of the House – Mathew Oram from 1950 to 1957
- Prime Minister – Sidney Holland from 13 December 1949 to 20 September 1957.
- Deputy Prime Minister – Keith Holyoake from 13 December 1949 to 20 September 1957.
- Minister of Finance – Jack Watts from November 1954 until 20 September 1957
- Minister of Foreign Affairs – Tom Macdonald from 26 November 1954 until 12 December 1957
- Chief Justice — Sir Harold Barrowclough

=== Parliamentary opposition ===
- Leader of the Opposition – Walter Nash (Labour).

=== Main centre leaders ===
- Mayor of Auckland – John Luxford from 1953 to 1956
- Mayor of Hamilton – Roderick Braithwaite from 1953 to 1959
- Mayor of Wellington – Robert Macalister from 1950 to 1956
- Mayor of Christchurch – Robert M. Macfarlane from 1938 to 1941 and again from 1950 to 1958
- Mayor of Dunedin – Leonard Morton Wright from 1950 to 1959

== Events ==
- A pulp and paper mill opens at Kawerau
- The Marriage Act 1955 is passed
- 3 November – the Rimutaka rail tunnel opens

== Arts and literature ==
See 1955 in art, 1955 in literature

=== Music ===
See: 1955 in music

=== Radio ===
See: Public broadcasting in New Zealand

=== Film ===
See: Category:1955 film awards, 1955 in film, List of New Zealand feature films, Cinema of New Zealand, Category:1955 films

== Sport ==
=== Athletics ===
Arthur Lydiard wins his second national title in the men's marathon, clocking 2:42:34 in Auckland.

=== Chess ===
- The 62nd National Chess Championship was held in Auckland, and was won by Ortvin Sarapu of Auckland (his 4th successive title).

=== Horse racing ===
==== Harness racing ====
- New Zealand Trotting Cup – Our Roger
- Auckland Trotting Cup – Prince Polka

=== Lawn bowls ===
The national outdoor lawn bowls championships are held in Wellington.

- Men's singles champion – J.H. Rabone (Northern Bowling Club)
- Men's pair champions – W.R. Hawkins, M.G. Borich (skip) (Hamilton Bowling Club)
- Men's fours champions – J. Whitehead, E.A. Horan, A. Robinson, I.B. Evans (skip) (Omarunui Bowling Club)

=== Soccer ===
- The Chatham Cup is won by Western of Christchurch who beat Eastern Suburbs of Auckland 6–2 in the final.
- New Zealand played 3 matches against South China Athletic
  - 18 June, Christchurch – 1–1 draw
  - 2 July, Wellington – NZ win 7–4
  - 9 July, Auckland – NZ lose 3–5
- Provincial league champions:
  - Auckland: Mount Albert GSOB
  - Bay of Plenty: Mangakino Utd
  - Buller: Millerton Thistle
  - Canterbury: Western
  - Hawke's Bay: Napier Rovers
  - Manawatu: Kiwi United
  - Nelson: Motueka
  - Northland: Otangarei United
  - Otago: King Edward Technical College OB
  - Poverty Bay: Eastern Union
  - South Canterbury: West End
  - Southland: Invercargill Thistle
  - Taranaki: Old Boys
  - Waikato: Huntly Thistle
  - Wanganui: Wanganui Athletic
  - Wellington: Stop Out

== Births ==
- 16 January: Steve Wooddin, soccer player
- 14 February: Margaret Knighton, equestrian eventer
- 31 March: Robert Vance, cricketer
- 2 April: Steve Sumner, soccer player
- 21 April: Tūheitia Paki, Māori King
- 27 May: Graham 'Jock' Edwards, cricketer
- 1 June: Lorraine Moller, long-distance athlete
- 19 June: Mary O'Connor, long-distance runner
- 16 September: Peter Verhoek, cricketer
- 29 September: Mark Graham, rugby league footballer and coach
- 1 November: Anne Audain, middle and long-distance athlete
- 12 November: Roger Sumich, cyclist
- 26 November: Barbara Tilden, field hockey player
- 2 December: Mark Gosche, politician
- 7 December: Te Ururoa Flavell, politician
- David Hamilton, composer

== Deaths ==
- 31 January: Bob Semple, trade union leader and politician.
- 7 May: Melville Lyons, politician
- 24 May: Louis Hekenui Bidois, policeman
- 5 June (in England): George Skellerup, industrialist
- 7 September: Henry Braddon, rugby union player.
- 14 December: William Stewart, politician.
- Undated: John Guthrie (at sea) journalist and novelist.

== See also ==
- List of years in New Zealand
- Timeline of New Zealand history
- History of New Zealand
- Military history of New Zealand
- Timeline of the New Zealand environment
- Timeline of New Zealand's links with Antarctica
