= Vivian Dunn =

British conductor (1908–1995)

Lieutenant Colonel Sir Vivian Dunn KCVO OBE FRSA
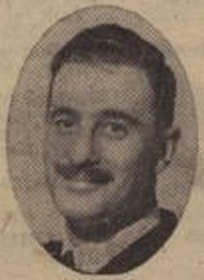
- Dunn, circa 1946

Background information
- Born: Francis Vivian Dunn; 24 December 1908; Jabalpur, Central Provinces and Berar, British India
- Origin: United Kingdom
- Died: 3 April 1995 (aged 86) Haywards Heath, Sussex, England, United Kingdom
- Genre: Military
- Occupations: Royal Marines Director of Music, conductor and composer
- Years active: 1920s–70s

Lieutenant Colonel Sir Francis Vivian Dunn KCVO OBE FRSA (24 December 1908 – 3 April 1995) was a British conductor who was Director of Music of the Portsmouth Division of the Royal Marines from 1931 to 1953 and Principal Director of Music of the Royal Marines from 1953 to 1968. He was the first British Armed Forces musician to be knighted.

== Early life ==
Francis Vivian Dunn was born in Jabalpur, India. His father, William James Dunn, was bandmaster of the Second Battalion King's Royal Rifle Corps and later director of music of the Royal Horse Guards. Dunn studied piano with his mother, Beatrice Maud, and undertook choral studies in Winchester. He attended the Hochschule für Musik Köln in 1923 and, two years later, the Royal Academy of Music. He studied conducting with Henry Wood and composition with Walton O'Donnell. As a violinist, he performed in the Queen's Hall Promenade Orchestra (under Wood), and in 1930 was a founding member of the BBC Symphony Orchestra (under several conductors).

== Career ==
Dunn was released from his contract with the BBC and on 3 September 1931 commissioned as a lieutenant in the Royal Marines to be director of music for the Portsmouth Division of the Corps. His duties included directing the Royal Marines Band on the Royal Yacht, where he encountered the Royal Family. Princess Margaret later recalled that Dunn was her childhood hero.

Dunn participated in the royal tour of South Africa on board HMS Vanguard in 1947 and a Royal Marines band tour of the United States and Canada in 1949. His promotion to lieutenant-colonel and principal director of music of the Royal Marines followed in 1953. Dunn and the Royal Marines Band accompanied Queen Elizabeth II and Prince Philip, Duke of Edinburgh on the SS Gothic for the post-coronation Commonwealth Tour. Upon its completion, the Queen appointed Dunn CVO, and in 1960 OBE.

In 1955, Dunn was asked by Euan Lloyd of Warwick Films to compose the theme music for The Cockleshell Heroes (which was otherwise scored by John Addison). He appears as himself, conducting the Royal Marines, in the end titles of the 1966 film Thunderbirds Are Go. For the latter, a cherry picker was used for filming, and Dunn insisted on being on the crane itself. But every time he started, the camera rocked. And as Dunn got more excited with the music, the camera rocked more and more to the point where the crew thought they were going to come off the crane, hence director David Lane had to ask Dunn if he could conduct from the floor instead.

Upon retiring from the military in December 1968, Dunn became a guest conductor with the City of Birmingham Symphony Orchestra. He also recorded with the Light Music Society Orchestra. In 1969, he received a knighthood with his appointment as KCVO in the 1969 New Year Honours (along with Sir Arthur Bliss). The same year he received an EMI Golden Disc for sales of more than one million Royal Marines Band records, and was also elected an honorary member of the American Bandmasters Association. In 1987, he received the Sudler Medal of the Order of Merit from the John Philip Sousa Foundation. He became the Founder President of the International Military Music Society in 1976, a position which he held until his death. In 1988, after serving as the Senior Warden, Dunn became the first military musician to be installed as the Master of the Worshipful Company of Musicians.

== Compositions ==
Dunn composed and arranged over 60 pieces of music. Several are marches, many with connections to the Royal Marines. These include The Globe and Laurel (1935, revised 1945), The Captain General (1949), Cockleshell Heroes (1955) and Mountbatten March (1972). He arranged many others, including Russian Preobrajensky March (author unknown); later to become the official slow march of the Royal Marines) and A Life on the Ocean Wave (the official quick march).

== Personal life ==
Dunn married Margery 'Mike' Halliday on 30 April 1938 at St Andrew's (the Royal Marine Artillery Church), at Eastney Barracks. They had one son (Major Patrick 'Paddy' Dunn, MBE, RM, who died in 2018) and two daughters (Leonie and Rosemary). Upon retiring from the Royal Marines, the Dunns finally settled into their home in Lindfield, West Sussex, which they had previously rented out whilst they were based in Deal.

Dunn died of lung cancer in Haywards Heath, West Sussex on 3 April 1995, aged 86. A memorial service was held at St Martin-in-the-Fields on 7 July 1995. Margery, Lady Dunn, died on 26 June 1998. They are buried together at Cemetery Chapel, East Mascalls Lane, Great Walstead, West Sussex.

== Recording ==
- "The Martial Music of Sir Vivian Dunn". The Band of Her Majesty's Royal Marines, Plymouth, Captain J. R. Perkins. Clovelly CL CD10394, recorded 1994.
