= Carl Björk =

Carl Björk may refer to:

- Carl Axel Björk (1880–1952), New Zealand whaler and goldminer
- Carl Björk (footballer, born 1992), Swedish footballer
- Carl Björk (footballer, born 2000), Swedish footballer
- Carl August Björk (1837–1916), Swedish missionary preacher

== See also ==
- Carl Björkman (disambiguation)
