= Le Bidois =

Bidois or Le Bidois is a French surname. Notable people with the surname include:

== Bidois ==
- Aaron Bidois, New Zealand Paralympic swimmer
- Brandan Bidois (born 2001), Australian professional baseball pitcher
- Dan Bidois, New Zealand politician
- Louis Hekenui Bidois
- Riley Bidois, New Zealand footballer
- Roséva Bidois (born 2000), French heptathlete

== Le Bidois ==
- Jean Le Bidois (1898–1927), French footballer
- Georges Le Bidois (1861–1945), French professor and grammarian
- Robert Le Bidois (1897–1971), French linguist and diplomat
