= Fabish =

Fabish is a surname. Notable people with the surname include:

- Agnes Fabish (1873–1947), New Zealand domestic servant, farmer and homemaker
- Georgia Fabish (born 1994), New Zealand actress
- Mark Fabish (born 1975), American football player and coach
