= Carl Björkman =

Carl Björkman may refer to:

- Carl Björkman (politician) (1873–1948), politician on the Åland Islands, Finland
- Carl Björkman (sport shooter) (1869–1960), Swedish sport shooter

== See also ==
- Carl Björk (disambiguation)
