= Preobrazhensky Regiment March =

Russian military march

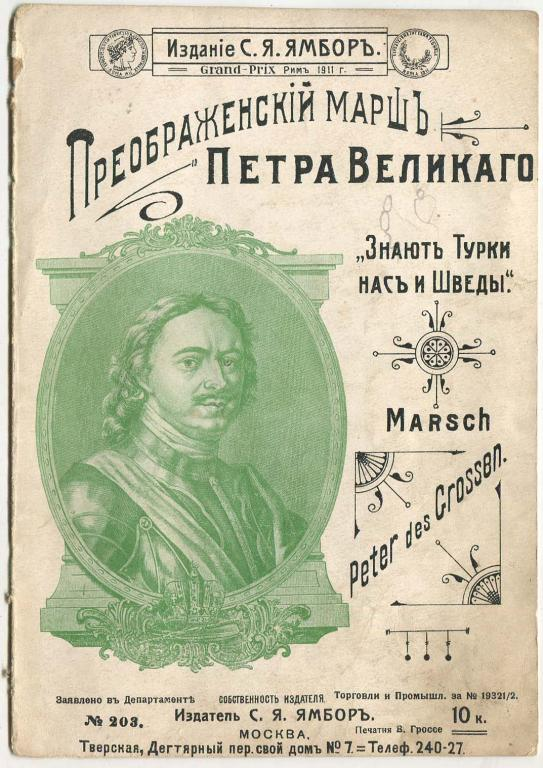
Preobrazhensky March of Peter the Great, 1911

The March of the Preobrazhensky Life-Guard Regiment (Russian: Марш Лейб-гвардии Преображенского полка) (AM I, 30), also known as the March of Peter the Great or simply the Russian March, is one of the most famous Russian military marches. The Preobrazhensky Life-Guards Regiment was one of the oldest and most elite guard regiments of the Imperial Russian Army.

Today the march is still used by the modern Russian Armed Forces, in particular the recreated 154th Preobrazhensky Independent Commandant's Regiment, most notably in the annual Victory Day Parade during inspection. It is also the slow march of the British Royal Marines, awarded by Admiral of the Fleet The Earl Mountbatten of Burma on the occasion of the Corps' tercentenary in 1964.

== Usage ==
=== Russian Empire ===
The march was used as an unofficial national anthem in early imperial times.

=== Modern Russia ===
The March of the Preobrazhensky Regiment was often used in modern Russia, particularly in the annual Victory Day Parade for the trooping of the colours (Flag of Russia and Banner of Victory), notably at the 2005 Victory Day Parade. However, from 2010, The Sacred War has been played instead, for only the trooping of flags. The March is only played during the parades' inspection segment.

The March is not believed to have been officially used in the Soviet Union much, but it was played by Soviet military bands in concerts and sometimes during the inspection segment of parades, notably during the 1990 Moscow Victory Day Parade.

=== United Kingdom ===
The March has been used as the slow march of the Royal Marines in the arrangement of Francis Vivian Dunn. It was awarded to them by Louis Mountbatten, 1st Earl Mountbatten of Burma on the occasion of the Corps's tercentenary in 1964.

=== Other uses ===
Before World War I, the work was used as the presentation march (German: Präsentiermarsch) in several military formations in Prussia. It was used in 1969 as the opening credits of The Life and Times of Lord Mountbatten.

== Origin ==
Neither the composer nor the date of The March's composition is known. Judging from an old title of the march, March of Peter the Great, it was perhaps written during Peter the Great's reign. Some European scholars have suggested Swedish authorship, but there is no evidence to support this claim. In German sources, the name of Ferdinand Haase (1788—1851) is mentioned. Haase indeed worked in Russia in the 19th century, and he wrote the second Marsch des Leib-Garde Preobraschenski Regiments. Some English sources, when referring to the arrangement of the march for the Royal Marines, erroneously give the name of the composer as Donajowsky. Francis Vivian Dunn, and early 20th Century British copies of the march, mistakenly attributed it to an Ernest Donajowski, who was in fact involved in the sheet music publishing business, and was not a composer.

Several lyrics are known for the march.

== Lyrics ==
=== Napoleonic Wars ===
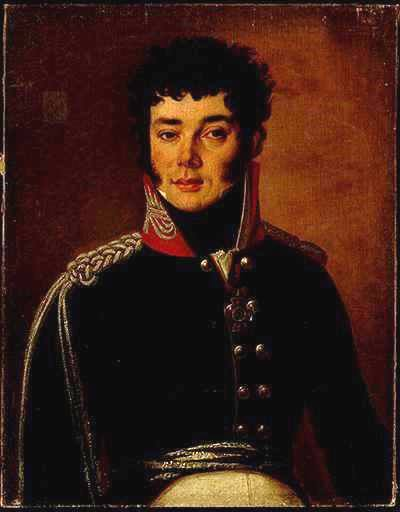
Sergey Marin

During the area of Peter the Great, the march, like most of its contemporaries was performed without vocals. In 1805 a set of vocals were introduced by Sergey Marin, who went from ensign of the Preobrazhensky Regiment, to the aide-de-camp of Alexander I. The words were written under the title "Let's go abroad brothers, beat the enemies of the Fatherland."

Russian original

Пойдем, братцы, за границу
Бить Отечества врагов.
Вспомним матушку-царицу,
Вспомним, век ее каков!

Славный век Екатерины
Нам напомнит каждый шаг,
Те поля, леса, долины,
Где бежал от русских враг.

Вот Суворов где сражался!
Там Румянцев где разил!
Каждый воин отличался,
Путь ко славе находил.

Каждый воин дух геройский
Среди мест сих доказал
И как славны наши войски
Целый свет об этом знал.

Между славными местами
Устремимся дружно в бой!
С лошадиными хвостами
Побежит француз домой.

За французом мы дорогу
И к Парижу будем знать.
Зададим ему тревогу,
Как столицу будем брать.

Там-то мы обогатимся,
В прах разбив богатыря
И тогда повеселимся
За народ и за Царя.

English translation

Let us go, brothers, beyond the border,
To strike at the Fatherland's foes.
Let us remember our Mother-Tsarina,
And what an age it was that she chose!

The glorious age of Catherine
Will be recalled with every stride,
In the fields, the woods, the valleys,
Where from the Russians the enemy fled and died.

There is where Suvorov fought!
There is where Rumyantsev struck!
Every soldier distinguished himself,
Finding the path to glory and luck.

Every warrior proved his heroic spirit
Amidst these very lands,
And how glorious our armies were,
The whole world understood their commands.

Through these places of past glory,
Let us rush together into the fray!
With their horse-tail standards trailing,
The Frenchman shall run home in dismay.

Following the Frenchman, we will find
The road that leads to Paris' gate.
We shall strike them with great alarm,
When we take their capital to seal their fate.

That is where we shall find our fortune,
Having crushed the giant into the dust,
And then we shall rejoice and revel,
For the people and the Tsar, as we must.

=== Mid 19th century ===
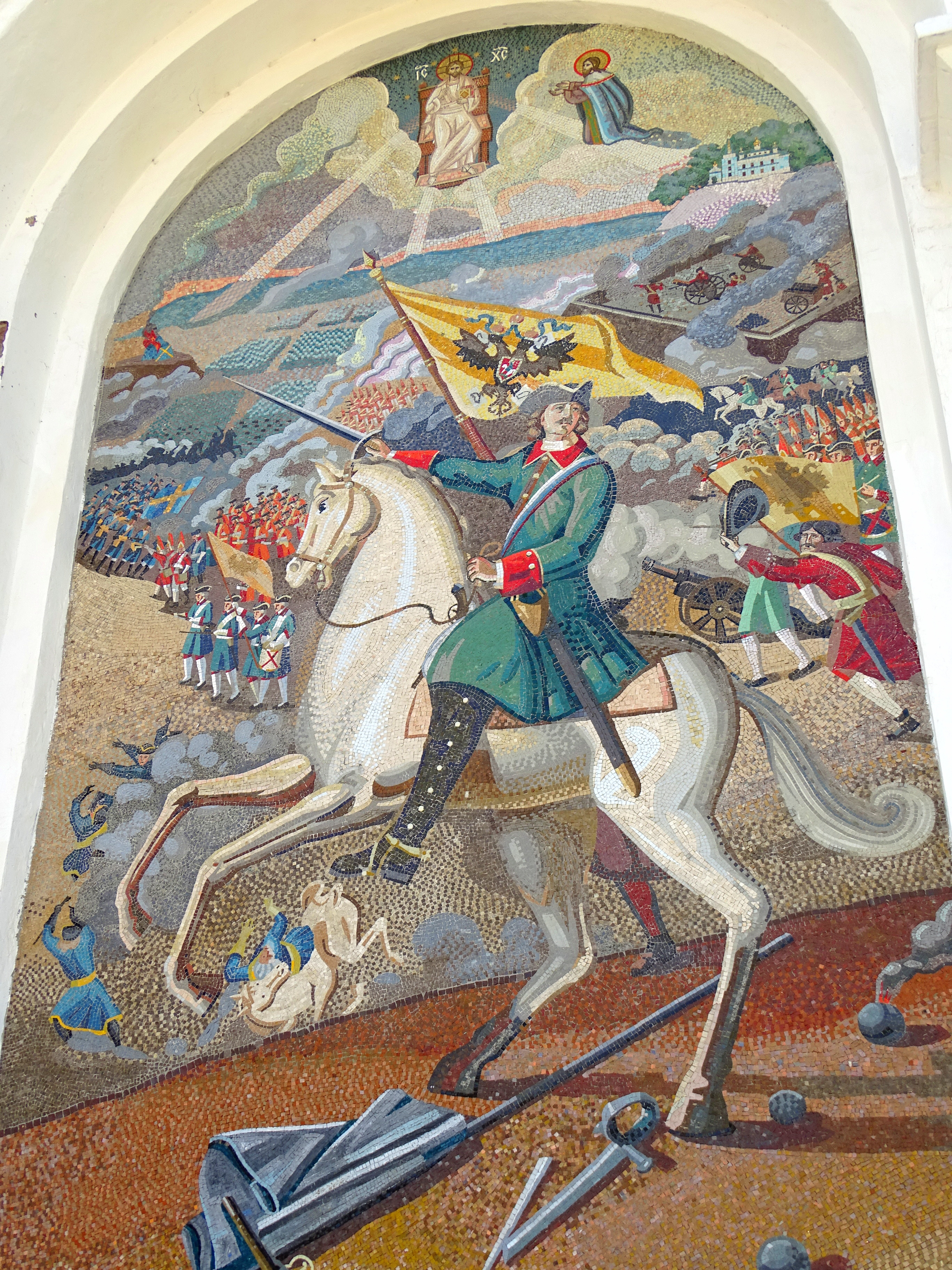
Sampson's Church, Poltava

In the second half of the 19th century, the march was often performed to the following words under the title of "How Glorious were our forefathers, or The Turks and Swedes know us." Due to the marches close association with the Emperor, it was always performed on solemn occasions such as military parades or other events of imperial importance, gaining a status as an unofficial national anthem.

Russian original

Знают турки нас и шведы,
И про нас известен свет.
На сраженьях, на победы
Нас всегда сам Царь ведет!

С нами труд Он разделяет,
Перед нами Он в боях,
Счастьем всяк из нас считает
Умереть в Его глазах.

Славны были наши деды,
Помнит их и швед и лях.
Их парил орел победы
На Полтавских на полях.

Знамя их полка пленяет
Русский штык наш боевой.
Он и нам напоминает,
Как ходили деды в бой.

Твёрд еще наш штык трёхгранный,
Голос чести не замолк.
Так пойдём вперед мы, славный,
Самый первый русский полк.

Государям по присяге
Верным полк наш был всегда.
В поле брани, не робея,
Грудью служим мы всегда.

Преображены удалые,
Рады тешить мы Царя,
И, потешные былые,
Славны, будем ввек! Ура!

Как и прежде - удалые,
Рады тешить мы Царя,
И солдаты боевые
Славны будут ввек, ура!

English translation

Turks and Swedes know us well
And we are famous in the world
To battles, to victories
Led by the Tsar himself!

He shares his labours with us
Before us he is in battle
Each of us would find happiness
to die before his eyes!

Glorious were our forefathers
Both the Swedes and Lechites remember them well
And the eagle of victory soared
Over the fields of Poltava!

The banners of their regiments were captured
By our Russian bayonet
It reminds us well
How our forefathers went to battle!

Our triangular bayonet is still firm
The voice of honour is not yet silent
So we would go forward - the glorious
The firstborn Russian regiment!

to our sovereign, by our oath
Our regiment has always stood firm
On the field of battle, without fear
With our chests, we always serve

We the valiant Preobrazhensky
Happy to amuse the Tsar
And the former toy soldiers
Will be glorious forever! Ura!

As before - the valiant ones
Happy to amuse the Tsar
And the former toy soldiers
Will be glorious forever! Ura!
