= 1957 Special Honours (New Zealand) =

Awards list for New Zealand

The 1957 Special Honours in New Zealand was a Special Honours List, dated 23 September, in which the outgoing prime minister was recognised.

== Order of the Bath ==
=== Knight Grand Cross (GCB) ===
Civil division

- The Right Honourable Sidney George Holland CH.
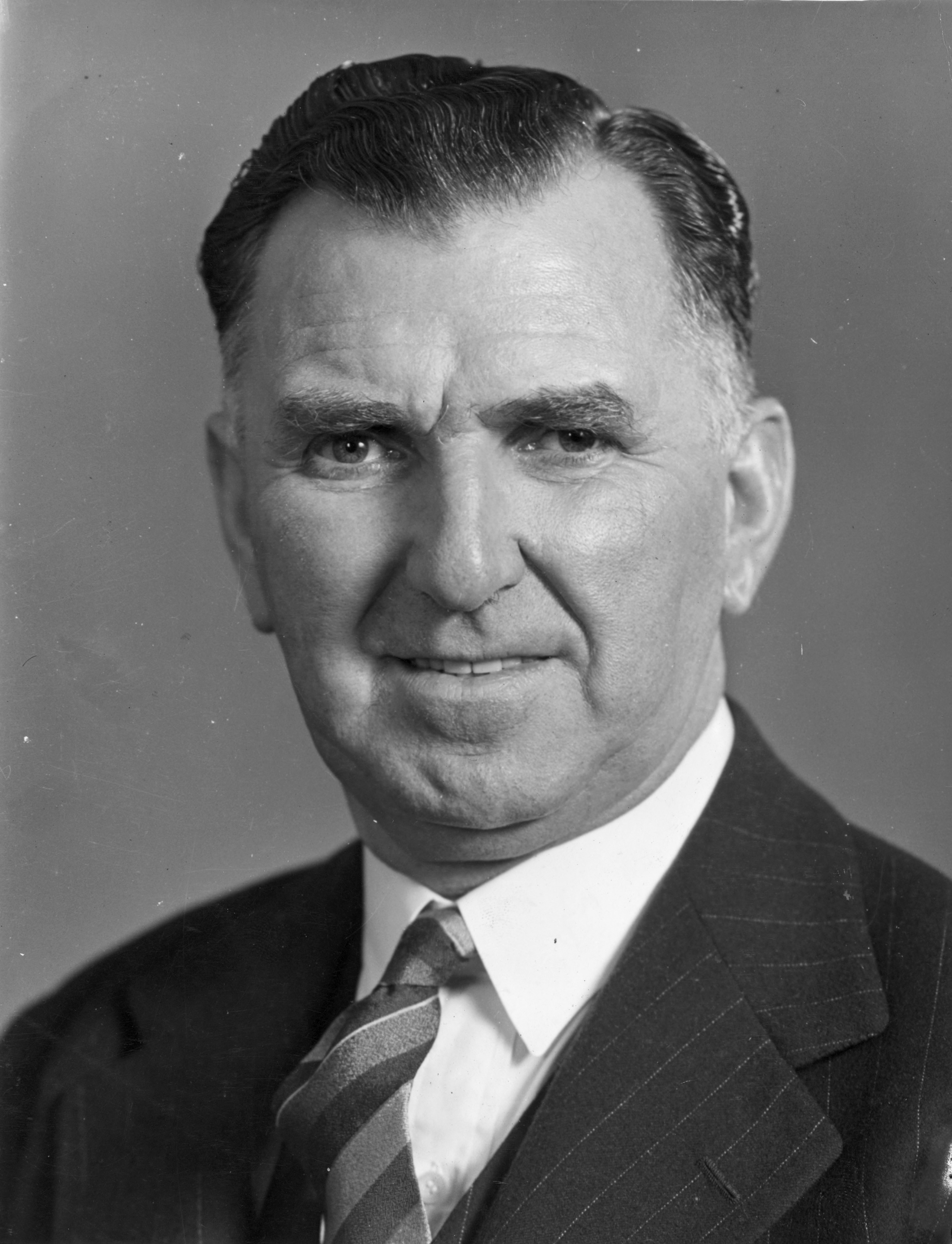
Sir Sidney Holland
