= Laurence Clark (cartoonist) =

New Zealand cartoonist and illustrator

Laurence Clark (born 1949) is a New Zealand cartoonist and illustrator.

He started his career in illustration in 1967 at the New Zealand Herald. He was the political cartoonist there from 1987 to 1996 and now freelances from Northland and is the Northern Advocate's editorial cartoonist. He publishes his cartoons under the name of "Klarc".

== Bibliography ==
- 10,000 years of beer: more or less (c2007) ISBN 978-0-473-12081-8
