= Graham Sligo =

New Zealand field hockey player

Graham William Sligo (born 24 December 1954 in Gisborne, New Zealand) is a former field hockey player from New Zealand, who was a member of the national team that finished seventh at the 1984 Summer Olympics in Los Angeles, United States.
