= Peter Gilbert (boxer) =

- Gilbert in 1972

Personal information
- Nationality: New Zealand
- Born: Peter Maurice Gilbert; 2 May 1950 Whangārei, New Zealand
- Died: 15 July 1976 (age 26) Noumea, New Caledonia
- Years active: 1962-1976
- Weight: 62.6 kg (138 lb)
- Spouse: Verena Gilbert
- Children: 2

Sport
- Sport: Boxing
- Weight class: Welterweight
- Coached by: Rod Langdon

Peter Maurice Gilbert (2 May 1950 – 15 July 1976) was a boxer from Whangārei, New Zealand who competed at regional boxing events, primarily in Auckland. In 1974 after Gilbert missed the selection for the Christchurch Commonwealth Games he announced his retirement but then continued back into boxing shortly after. Before his death, Gilbert won the Northland Regional Final and also won at the Auckland championships in 1972. He then competed with Robert Colley but lost. The fight against Colley was rated one of the best of his career.

In 1974 Gilbert won the top boxing amateur trophy, the Bridgens Cup where he went against Semi Te Patui. Gilbert died in 1976 after a bout which took place in Noumea, New Caledonia.

== Career ==
Gilbert began his career in 1962. He began training in his home town of Whangārei. During his early career he was rated as one of the top two light welterweight boxers in the country. During his career, Gilbert won the Auckland light welterweight title and once the Waikato title. He won the Northland Regional Final and also followed by a win in 1972 at the Auckland championships.

Gilbert was a finalist in trials for the New Zealand team for the 1984 Commonwealth Games but was beaten by his opponent David Jackson. He briefly announced his retirement but then went against Semi Te Patui and won the Bridgens Cup, the top amateur trophy in Auckland. The event was held at Carlaw Park.

== Death ==
Gilbert was invited to fight in Noumea, New Caledonia by the Auckland Boxing Association in 1976. At the time Gilbert was under a mandatory month-long suspension after he was knocked out in a previous fight three weeks prior to the fight in Noumea. Half an hour into his welterweight bout against Lucien Wenice in Noumea on 10 July 1976, Gilbert collapsed. He underwent emergency surgery but died five days later.

== Personal life ==
When Gilbert died he was married to his wife Verena. He had two children, Michael and Kim.

== Legacy ==
In 1977, a year after Gilbert died, the first memorial tournament for Gilbert was held in Auckland at the Glenora Rugby League Club by the Auckland Boxing Trainers' Association; the Peter Gilbert Memorial Shield was presented to the winner of the tournament. In 1978, the second memorial tournament was held in the Whangārei Town Hall. Since the memorial tournaments, a trophy was dedicated for Gilbert as the Peter Gilbert Trophy for Boxing and Sport.
