= Peter Verhoek =

New Zealand cricketer (born 1955)

Peter Verhoek (born 16 September 1955 in Auckland) is a New Zealand former cricketer who played for Central Districts Stags. He scored 171 runs in seven first class matches.
