= Lavinia Jane Kelsey =

New Zealand kindergarten founder and teacher

Lavinia Jane Kelsey (23 February 1856 – 16 June 1948) was a New Zealand kindergarten founder and teacher. She was born in London, London, England on 23 February 1856.
