= Louis Hekenui Bidois =

Louis Hekenui Bidois (28 March 1899–24 May 1955) was a New Zealand policeman. Of Māori descent, he identified with the Ngāi Te Rangi and Ngati Ranginui iwi. He was born in Te Puna, Bay of Plenty, New Zealand on 28 March 1899.
