= Carl Axel Björk =

New Zealand whaler and goldminer

- Born: 5 August 1880; Stockholm, Sweden
- Died: 17 September 1952 (aged 72); Riverton, New Zealand
- Occupations: Whaler, goldminer
- Known for: Early New Zealand coastal whaling and goldmining life

Carl Axel Björk (5 August 1880–17 September 1952) was a New Zealand whaler, goldminer and character. He was born in Stockholm, Sweden on 5 August 1880. He died in Riverton, New Zealand in 1952.
