= SS Gothic =

A number of steamships have been named Gothic, including

- SS Gothic (1893) was an ocean liner built in 1893 and scrapped in 1926
- SS Gothic (1919), a British tanker in service 1939–40
- SS Gothic (1920), a British cargo ship in service 1922–39
- SS Gothic (1947), a British cargo liner in service from 1948 to at least 1958.
