= Agnes Fabish =

New Zealand domestic servant, farmer and homemaker

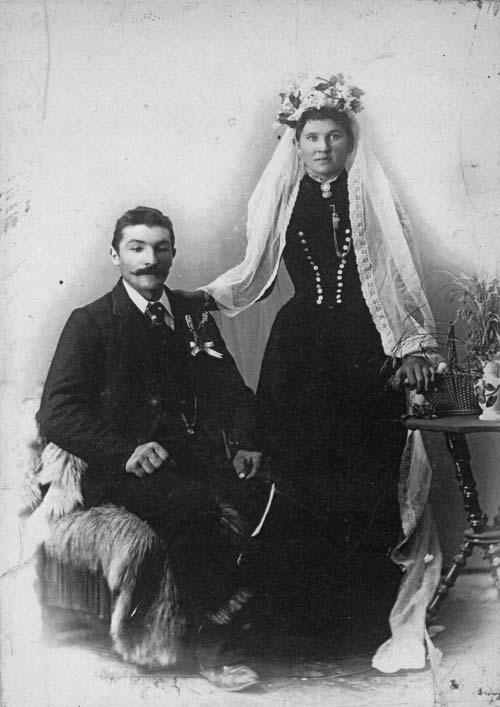
Wedding portrait of Agnes Fabish and her husband, January 1, 1894.

Agnes Fabish (21 December 1873–21 July 1947) was a New Zealand domestic servant, farmer and homemaker.
