= Frank Livingstone (bowls) =

New Zealand bowls player

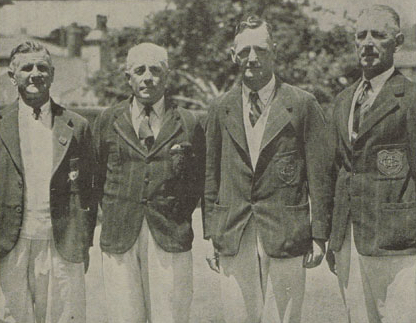
- Livingstone (right), as skip of the Onehunga four that won the fours title at the 1940 New Zealand national lawn bowls championships

Personal information
- Born: 1 August 1886 New Zealand
- Died: 17 August 1966 (aged 80) Auckland, New Zealand
- Occupation: Farmer
- Spouse: Hazel Irene McMaster (m. 1915)

Sport
- Sport: Lawn bowls
- Club: Onehunga BC
Medal record
Men's lawn bowls
Representing New Zealand
Commonwealth Games
Silver medal – second place	1938 Sydney	Singles

Frank Livingstone (1 August 1886 – 17 August 1966) was a New Zealand lawn bowls player.

== Bowls career ==
At the 1938 British Empire Games in Sydney he won the men's singles silver medal. Livingstone died on 17 August 1966 and was buried at Waikaraka Cemetery in Onehunga.

In 2013, Livingstone was an inaugural inductee into the Bowls New Zealand Hall of Fame.

He won the 1936 & 1952 singles titles, 1949 & 1962 pairs titles and 1940 & 1948 fours titles at the New Zealand National Bowls Championships and also won the Australian National Bowls Championships singles title in 1949 (all when bowling for the Onehunga Bowls Club).
