= Clifton Webb (politician) =

New Zealand diplomat (1889–1962)

The Honourable Sir Clifton Webb KCMG QC
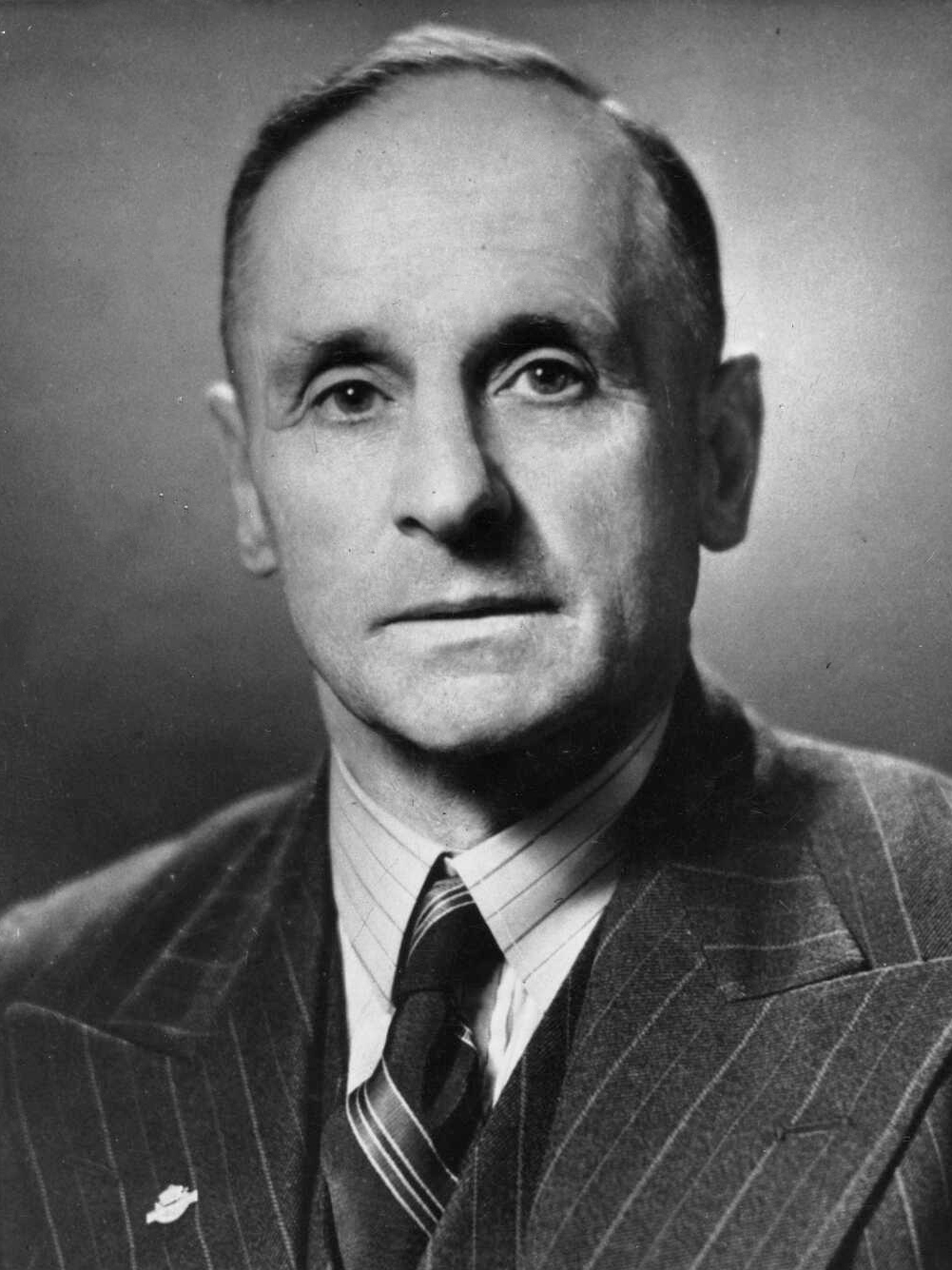
- Webb in 1949

18th Attorney-General
- In office 13 December 1949 – 26 November 1954
- Prime Minister: Sidney Holland
- Preceded by: Rex Mason
- Succeeded by: Jack Marshall

31st Minister of Justice
- In office 13 December 1949 – 26 November 1954
- Prime Minister: Sidney Holland
- Preceded by: Rex Mason
- Succeeded by: Jack Marshall

Personal details
- Born: Thomas Clifton Webb; 8 March 1889 Te Kōpuru, New Zealand
- Died: 6 February 1962 (aged 72) Wellington, New Zealand
- Party: National
- Spouse: Lucy Nairn
- Children: 2 daughters
- Education: Auckland University College

Sir Thomas Clifton Webb KCMG QC (8 March 1889 – 6 February 1962) was a New Zealand politician and diplomat.

== Early life ==
He was born in Te Kōpuru, near Dargaville, in 1889. Thomas Webb was his father. He received his education at Te Kōpuru School, Auckland Grammar School, and the studied at Auckland University College. He practised law in Dargaville. He was in the army from 1917 to 1919, then returned to his practice in Dargaville and was a borough councillor there from 1921 to 1923. He moved to Auckland in 1927 and established a new law firm there.

== Member of Parliament ==
New Zealand Parliament
Years	Term	Electorate	Party
1943–1946	27th	Kaipara	Independent
1946	Changed allegiance to:		National
1946–1949	28th	Rodney	National
1949–1951	29th	Rodney	National
1951–1954	30th	Rodney	National

He sat in Parliament from 1943 until 1954: first as an Independent National MP for Kaipara (1943–1946) and then as the National Party MP for Rodney (1946–1954). A key aide to party leader Sidney Holland, he was appointed to Attorney-General upon National gaining power in 1949. As Minister of Justice, he was responsible for drafting the legislation that resulted in the abolition of the Legislative Council.

In 1951, he took his first step into diplomacy by adding Minister for External Affairs and Minister of Island Territories to his other duties; portfolios which he held from 1951 to 1954. In 1953, he was awarded the Queen Elizabeth II Coronation Medal. In 1955, Webb was granted the use of the title of "Honourable" for life, having served more than three years as a member of the Executive Council. He served as the country's High Commissioner to the United Kingdom between 1955 and 1958, and was appointed a Knight Commander of the Order of St Michael and St George in the 1956 New Year Honours.

== Family ==
On 1 September 1915, Webb married Lucy Nairn in Auckland; they were to have two daughters. He died on 6 February 1962 in Wellington. His wife died in 1983.

Political offices
Preceded by Rex Mason	Minister of Justice; 1949–1954	Succeeded by Jack Marshall
Preceded by Rex Mason	Attorney-General; 1949–1954	Succeeded by Jack Marshall
Diplomatic posts
Preceded by Frederick Doidge	High Commissioner of New Zealand to the United Kingdom; 1955–1958	Succeeded by Dick Campbell (acting); George Laking (acting); Tom Macdonald
