= Humphrey O'Leary =

New Zealand judge (1886–1953)

The Right Honourable Sir Humphrey O'Leary KCMG QC
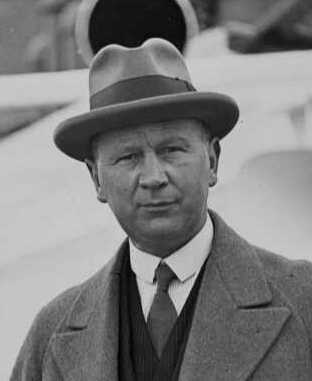
- O'Leary in 1932

7th Chief Justice of New Zealand
- In office 12 August 1946 – 16 October 1953
- Nominated by: Peter Fraser
- Appointed by: Lord Freyberg
- Preceded by: Michael Myers
- Succeeded by: Harold Barrowclough

Personal details
- Born: Humphrey Francis O'Leary; 12 February 1886 Redwoodtown, New Zealand
- Died: 16 October 1953 (aged 67) Auckland, New Zealand

Sir Humphrey Francis O'Leary KCMG QC (12 February 1886 – 16 October 1953) was the seventh Chief Justice of New Zealand, from 1946 to 1953.

== Early life and family ==
Born in Redwoodtown in the Wairau Valley, Marlborough, in 1886, his father, an Irish immigrant, was a blacksmith who had migrated to Masterton. When his father heard that one of his sons was not doing well at the local Catholic school, he sent his son to Masterton Public. From that time, although he remained faithful to the Catholic religion, Humphrey O'Leary attended state schools. He gained a Wellington Education Board scholarship and Queen's Scholarship in 1899, which enabled him to attend Wellington College. There his academic ability, outgoing personality and sporting prowess made him a popular student. The Queen's Scholarship also paid for three years at university and he enrolled in 1902 to study law at Victoria College.

In 1912, O'Leary married Lillian Gallagher, and the couple went on to have one son.

== Legal career ==
O'Leary was awarded an LLB degree in 1908, and from 1908 to 1909 he was a New Zealand University rugby representative. He first worked for Wilford and Levi, a law firm, then went into partnership with a university friend Frank Kelly as O'Leary and Kelly. In 1919 he was invited to join the Wellington legal firm that would become known as Bell Gully. He was appointed a King's Counsel on 30 May 1935.

O'Leary was president of the Wellington Law Society from 1921 to 1922, and the New Zealand Law Society between 1935 and 1946. He also served on the Victoria University College Council and the University of New Zealand Senate. He was the Chief Justice of New Zealand from 1946 until his death in Auckland in 1953, aged 67.

== Honours and awards ==
O'Leary was made a King's Counsel in 1935, a Knight Commander of the Order of St Michael and St George in the 1947 New Year Honours, and Honourable Master of the Bench of the Inner Temple, London in 1948. In 1953, he was awarded the Queen Elizabeth II Coronation Medal.

== See also ==
- List of King's and Queen's Counsel in New Zealand

== Notes ==
Legal offices
Preceded by Michael Myers	Chief Justice of New Zealand; 1946–1953	Succeeded by Harold Barrowclough
