= Harold Caro =

New Zealand politician (1887–1964)

Harold Caro OBE
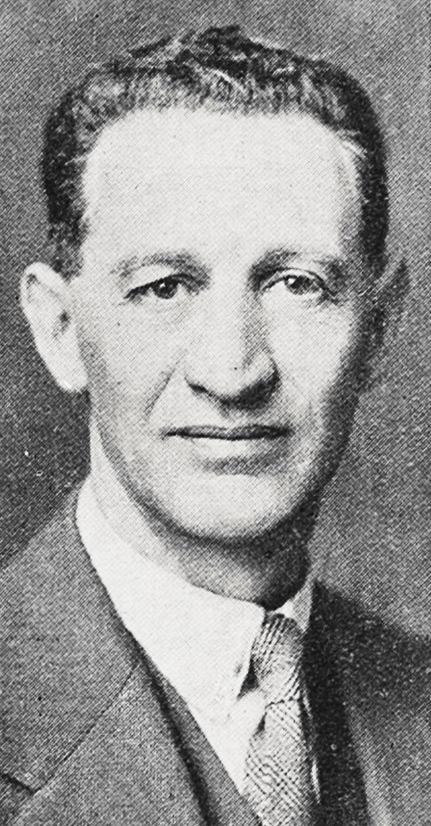

23rd Mayor of Hamilton
- In office 1938–1953
- Preceded by: John Robert Fow
- Succeeded by: Roderick Braithwaite

Personal details
- Born: Harold David Caro; 1 September 1887 Christchurch, New Zealand
- Died: 10 June 1964 (aged 76)
- Party: Democrat
- Spouse: Rubina Ballin (m. 1916)

Harold David Caro OBE (1 September 1887 – 10 June 1964) was the 23rd mayor of Hamilton, New Zealand and a Hamilton businessman. He was awarded the OBE in 1950.

== Biography ==
He was born in Christchurch to Mrs Lewis Caro the eighth of ten children. He was educated in Parnell, Auckland and was employed by P Hayman of Auckland. Then he was a partner in Caro Bros, Auckland from 1910 to 1923. In 1923 he founded Caros GBS or Great Bargain Stores in Hamilton.

He was on the Hamilton Borough Council from 1931 to 1953, and was Mayor of Hamilton from 1938 to 1953, when he was defeated. He was chairman of the Waikato Hospital Board from 1948 to 1953, and chairman of the Waikato Patriotic Fund Board from 1939 to 1954. He was re-elected to the Hamilton City Council in 1959. In 1953, he was awarded the Queen Elizabeth II Coronation Medal.

Caro contested the seat of Hamilton at the 1935 general election for the anti-Labour Democrat Party, polling third with 20% of the vote.

He married Rubina Iris 'Renee' Ballin daughter of Bernhard Ballin of Christchurch in 1916. He had one son David Bernard Caro FRCS born 8 February 1922. In 1961 he was living in Raglan.

== Notes ==
Political offices
Preceded by John Robert Fow	Mayor of Hamilton; 1938–1953	Succeeded by Roderick Braithwaite
