= Minister of Foreign Affairs (New Zealand) =

New Zealand minister of the Crown

- Coat of Arms of New Zealand

- Flag of New Zealand

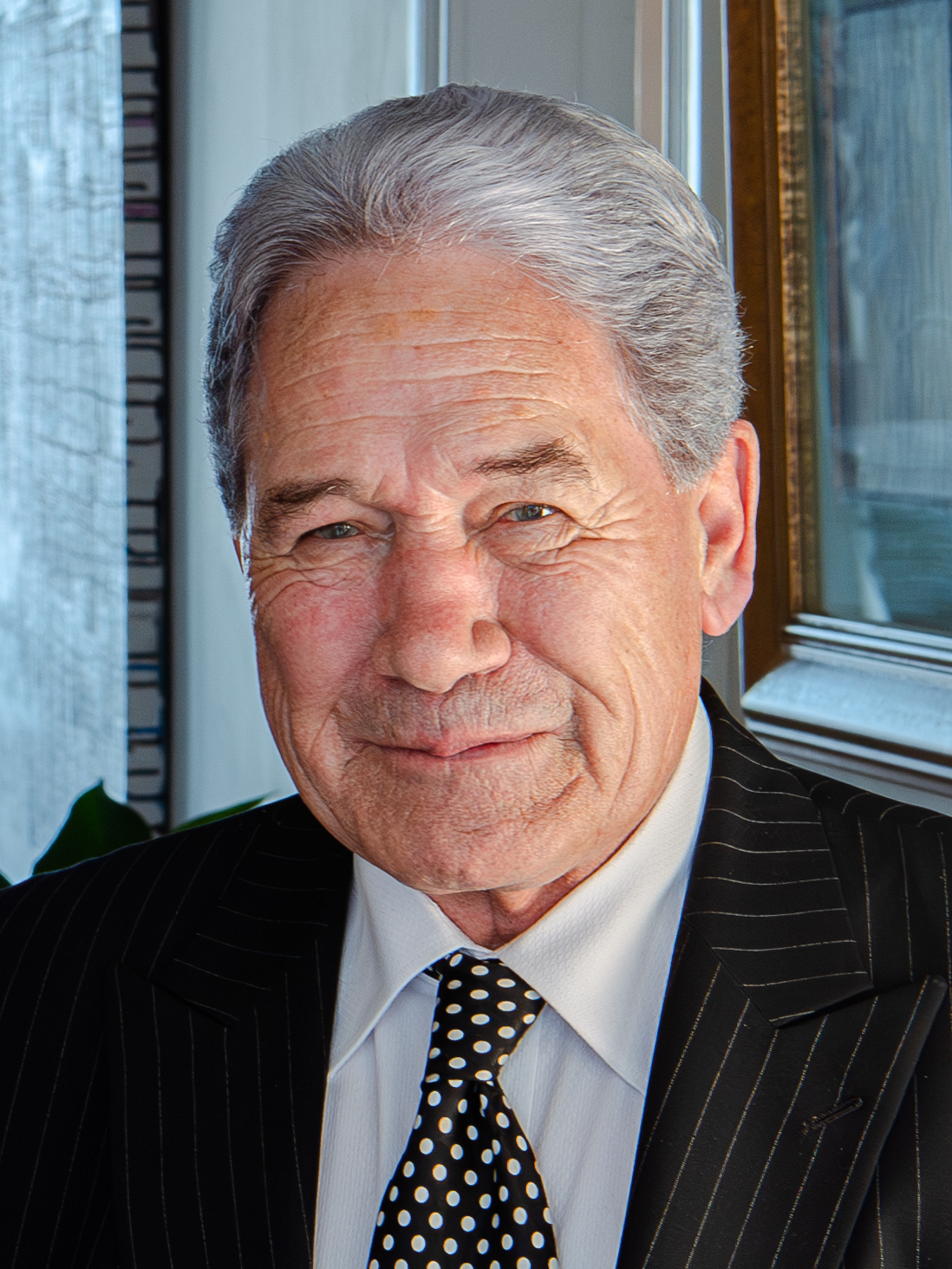
- Incumbent; Winston Peters since 27 November 2023
- Ministry of Foreign Affairs and Trade
- Style: The Honourable
- Member of: Cabinet of New Zealand; Executive Council
- Reports to: Prime Minister of New Zealand
- Appointer: Governor-General of New Zealand
- Term length: At His Majesty's pleasure
- Inaugural holder: James Allen
- Formation: 24 November 1919
- Salary: $288,900
- Website: www.beehive.govt.nz

The minister of foreign affairs, also known as the foreign minister, is a senior minister in the New Zealand Government heading the Ministry of Foreign Affairs and Trade and responsible for relations with foreign countries.

The current minister of foreign affairs is Winston Peters.

== Responsibilities and powers ==
The minister of foreign affairs is responsible for overseeing New Zealand's relations with foreign countries and the promotion of New Zealand's interests abroad. The minister is in charge of the Ministry of Foreign Affairs and Trade, including New Zealand's diplomatic staff. The office is often considered to be one of the more distinguished ministerial posts, and has at times been counted as the most senior role below that of the prime minister. In terms of actual political power, however, the minister of foreign affairs is not as prominent as in countries such as Australia, Canada, the United Kingdom and the United States, with the minister of finance being considerably more influential.

== History ==
The first New Zealand foreign minister was James Allen, appointed to the post of Minister of External Affairs by William Massey in 1919. Before this time, there was no dedicated ministerial portfolio for foreign relations. A Department of External Affairs was created in 1919 but its functions were limited to administering New Zealand's Island Territories in the Pacific; namely the Cook Islands, Niue, Tokelau, and the League of Nations Mandate of Samoa. In 1943, a new Department of External Affairs was created to conduct the country's external relations. The older department was then renamed the Department of Island Territories and a separate portfolio called the Minister of Island Territories was subsequently created.

From 1943, the minister of external affairs became the main ministerial portfolio for conducting New Zealand's external relations. Like its similarly named Australian and Canadian counterparts, the portfolio was called "External Affairs" rather than "Foreign Affairs" in deference of the British Government's responsibility for conducting foreign policy on behalf of the British Empire and later the Commonwealth of Nations. The title was changed to Minister of Foreign Affairs in 1970 after the department was renamed the Ministry of Foreign Affairs. From 1993, the portfolio was merged with the trade portfolio (except for trade negotiations, which were a separate responsibility) as Minister of Foreign Affairs and Trade. In 2005, responsibility for trade was returned to a separate portfolio and the title of "Minister of Foreign Affairs" was restored.

The minister of foreign affairs is usually a senior member of the Cabinet. The portfolio has been held by 13 prime ministers, including Peter Fraser, Walter Nash, Keith Holyoake, David Lange and Mike Moore, and has been assigned to the deputy prime minister on four occasions. Only once has the foreign minister sat outside of Cabinet (Winston Peters between 2005 and 2008).

New Zealand has had 29 foreign ministers (regardless of exact title). The longest-serving was Keith Holyoake, who held the post for the duration of his 11-year premiership. The second longest-serving, and the longest-serving who was not also prime minister, was Don McKinnon, who later became Commonwealth Secretary-General.

== List of ministers of foreign affairs ==
Key

Reform United Labour National NZ First

| No. | Name | Portrait | Term of office | | Prime Minister |
|---|---|---|---|---|---|
| 1 | James Allen | | 24 November 1919 | 28 April 1920 | Massey |
| 2 | Ernest Lee | | 17 May 1920 | 13 January 1923 | Massey |
| 3 | Francis Bell | | 7 June 1923 | 18 January 1926 | Massey |
| 3 | Francis Bell | | 7 June 1923 | 18 January 1926 | Bell |
| 3 | Francis Bell | | 7 June 1923 | 18 January 1926 | Coates |
| 4 | William Nosworthy | | 24 May 1926 | 24 August 1928 | Coates |
| 5 | Gordon Coates | | 25 August 1928 | 10 December 1928 | Coates |
| 6 | Joseph Ward | | 10 December 1928 | 28 May 1930 | Ward |
| 7 | George Forbes | | 28 May 1930 | 6 December 1935 | Forbes |
| 8 | Michael Joseph Savage | | 6 December 1935 | 27 March 1940† | Savage |
| 9 | Frank Langstone | | 1 April 1940 | 21 December 1942 | Fraser |
| 10 | Peter Fraser | | 7 July 1943 | 13 December 1949 | Fraser |
| 11 | Frederick Doidge | | 13 December 1949 | 19 September 1951 | Holland |
| 12 | Clifton Webb | | 19 September 1951 | 26 November 1954 | Holland |
| 13 | Tom Macdonald | | 26 November 1954 | 12 December 1957 | Holland |
| 13 | Tom Macdonald | | 26 November 1954 | 12 December 1957 | Holyoake |
| 14 | Walter Nash | | 12 December 1957 | 12 December 1960 | Nash |
| 15 | Keith Holyoake | | 12 December 1960 | 8 December 1972 | Holyoake |
| 15 | Keith Holyoake | | 12 December 1960 | 8 December 1972 | Marshall |
| 16 | Norman Kirk | | 8 December 1972 | 31 August 1974 | Kirk |
| 17 | Bill Rowling | | 6 September 1974 | 12 December 1975 | Rowling |
| 18 | Brian Talboys | | 12 December 1975 | 11 December 1981 | Muldoon |
| 19 | Warren Cooper | | 11 December 1981 | 26 July 1984 | Muldoon |
| 20 | David Lange | | 26 July 1984 | 24 August 1987 | Lange |
| 21 | Russell Marshall | | 24 August 1987 | 9 February 1990 | Lange |
| 21 | Russell Marshall | | 24 August 1987 | 9 February 1990 | Palmer |
| 22 | Mike Moore | | 9 February 1990 | 2 November 1990 | Palmer |
| 22 | Mike Moore | | 9 February 1990 | 2 November 1990 | Moore |
| 23 | Don McKinnon | | 2 November 1990 | 10 December 1999 | Bolger |
| 23 | Don McKinnon | | 2 November 1990 | 10 December 1999 | Shipley |
| 24 | Phil Goff | | 10 December 1999 | 19 October 2005 | Clark |
| 25 | Winston Peters | | 19 October 2005 | 29 August 2008 | Clark |
| | Helen Clark; Acting Minister | | 29 August 2008 | 19 November 2008 | Clark |
| 26 | Murray McCully | | 19 November 2008 | 2 May 2017 | Key |
| 26 | Murray McCully | | 19 November 2008 | 2 May 2017 | English |
| 27 | Gerry Brownlee | | 2 May 2017 | 26 October 2017 | English |
| (25) | Winston Peters | | 26 October 2017 | 6 November 2020 | Ardern |
| 28 | Nanaia Mahuta | | 6 November 2020 | 11 November 2023 | Ardern |
| 28 | Nanaia Mahuta | | 6 November 2020 | 11 November 2023 | Hipkins |
| 29 | Grant Robertson | | 11 November 2023 | 27 November 2023 | Hipkins |
| (25) | Winston Peters | | 27 November 2023 | Incumbent | Luxon |
