= Chief Justice of New Zealand =

Head of the New Zealand judiciary

- Kaiwhakawā Tumuaki o Aotearoa (Māori)
- Judiciary of New Zealand

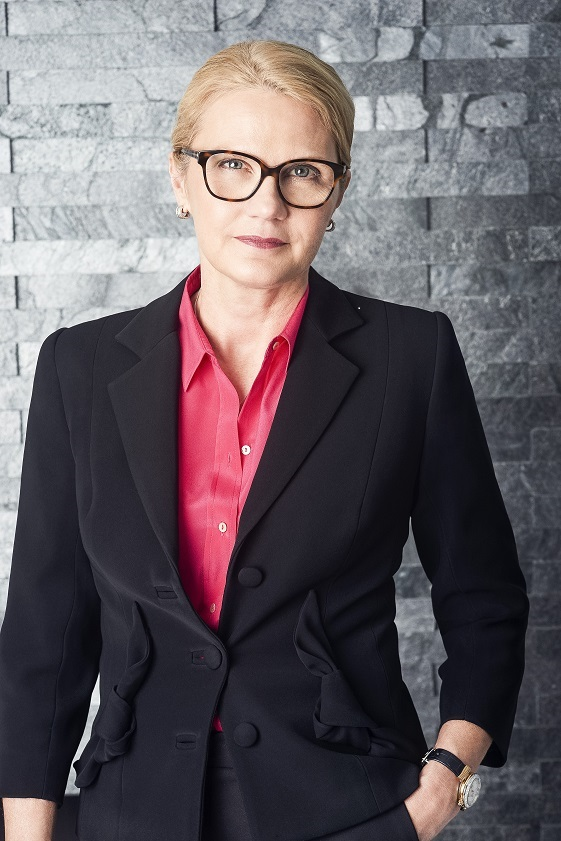
- Incumbent; Dame Helen Winkelmann since 14 March 2019
- Style: The Right Honourable
- Nominator: Prime Minister of New Zealand
- Appointer: Governor-General of New Zealand
- Term length: No set term, though retirement is mandatory at age 70
- Formation: 5 February 1841
- First holder: Sir William Martin
- Salary: NZ$578,000 (base salary, 2022–23)

The chief justice of New Zealand (Māori: Te Kaiwhakawā Tumuaki o Aotearoa) is the head of the New Zealand judiciary, and presides over the Supreme Court of New Zealand. The chief justice of New Zealand is also the chief justice of Tokelau. Before the establishment of the Supreme Court in 2004, the chief justice was the presiding judge in the High Court of New Zealand, and was also ex officio a member of the Court of Appeal of New Zealand. The office is established by the Senior Courts Act 2016, which describes the chief justice as "senior to all other judges".

The chief justice is first among equals among the Judges of the Supreme Court. They also act in place of the governor-general if one has not been appointed or if the appointee is unable to perform their duties. When acting in place of the governor-general, the chief justice is known as the "administrator of the Government".

The chief justice is appointed by the governor-general, on the formal advice of the prime minister. The current chief justice is the Rt Hon Dame Helen Winkelmann, who was appointed on 14 March 2019 to replace the Rt Hon Dame Sian Elias, who had reached mandatory retirement at age 70.

== History ==
From 1841 to 1957, the chief justice was the indisputable senior member of the New Zealand judiciary, and served on the old Supreme Court (now called the High Court of New Zealand). Prior to 1957, all judges of the Supreme Court sat as members of the Court of Appeal. In 1957, a permanent Court of Appeal was established which was headed by a President responsible for the running of that court. The role of the chief justice became akin to that of the current chief High Court judge, responsible for the operation of the High Court (comprising the largest part of the senior judiciary) but not having control over the senior New Zealand–based appellate court (being the Court of Appeal).

This changed in 2004 with the abolition of the right of appeal to the Judicial Committee of the Privy Council and its replacement by the Supreme Court of New Zealand as the court of last resort for New Zealand. When the new Supreme Court was established, the chief justice became head of that court.

=== List of chief justices ===
No.	Image	Chief Justice	Assumed office	Left office
1		Hon. Sir William Martin	5 February 1841	12 June 1857
2		Hon. Sir George Arney	c. 1858	1875
3		Hon. Sir James Prendergast GCMG	1 April 1875	25 May 1899
4		Rt Hon. Sir Robert Stout GCMG	25 May 1899	31 January 1926
5		Hon. Sir Charles Skerrett KCMG KC	1 February 1926	13 February 1929
6		Rt Hon. Sir Michael Myers GCMG KC	3 May 1929	7 August 1946
7		Rt Hon. Sir Humphrey O'Leary KCMG KC	12 August 1946	16 October 1953
8		Rt Hon. Sir Harold Barrowclough KCMG CB DSO MC ED	17 November 1953	17 January 1966
9		Rt Hon. Sir Richard Wild GBE KCMG QC	18 January 1966	January 1978
10		Rt Hon. Sir Ronald Davison GBE CMG QC	3 February 1978	4 February 1989
11		Rt Hon. Sir Thomas Eichelbaum GBE QC	6 February 1989	16 May 1999
12		Rt Hon. Dame Sian Elias GNZM PC QC	17 May 1999	13 March 2019
13		Rt Hon. Dame Helen Winkelmann GNZM	14 March 2019	present
