= Sidney Holland =

Prime Minister of New Zealand from 1949 to 1957

The Right Honourable Sir Sidney Holland GCB CH
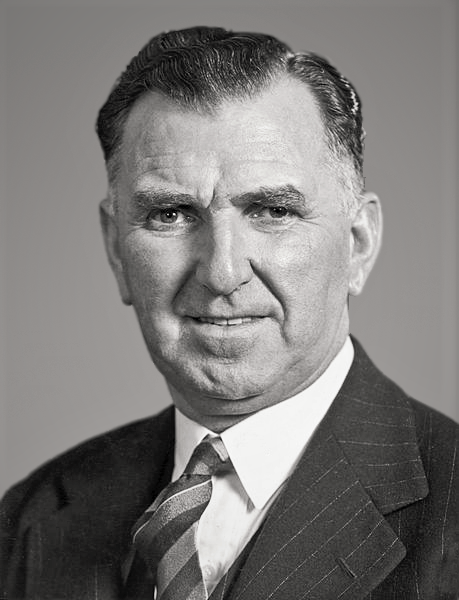
- Holland in 1953

25th Prime Minister of New Zealand
- In office 13 December 1949 – 20 September 1957
- Monarchs: George VI; Elizabeth II
- Governors-General: Bernard Freyberg; Charles Norrie; Charles Lyttelton
- Deputy: Keith Holyoake
- Preceded by: Peter Fraser
- Succeeded by: Keith Holyoake

14th Leader of the Opposition
- In office 26 November 1940 – 13 December 1949
- Deputy: William Polson (1940–46); Keith Holyoake (1946–49)
- Preceded by: Adam Hamilton
- Succeeded by: Peter Fraser

Personal details
- Born: 18 October 1893 Greendale, Canterbury, New Zealand
- Died: 5 August 1961 (aged 67) Wellington, New Zealand
- Party: Reform (1935–1938); National (1938–1957)
- Spouse: Florence Beatrice Drayton
- Children: 4, including Eric
- Parent: Henry Holland (father)

Military service
- Allegiance: New Zealand
- Branch/service: New Zealand Military Forces
- Years of service: 1915–1917
- Rank: Second Lieutenant
- Unit: 13th Battery, New Zealand Field Artillery
- Battles/wars: World War I; Battle of Messines

Sir Sidney George Holland GCB CH PC (18 October 1893 – 5 August 1961) was a New Zealand politician who served as the 25th prime minister of New Zealand from 13 December 1949 to 20 September 1957. He was instrumental in the creation and consolidation of the New Zealand National Party, which was to dominate New Zealand politics for much of the second half of the 20th century.

Holland was elected to parliament in 1935, and became the second Leader of the National Party, and Leader of the Opposition, in 1940. He served briefly (1942) in a war cabinet but thereafter attacked the Labour government for its interventionist economic policies. Holland led the National Party to its first election victory in 1949. His National government implemented moderate economic reforms, dismantling many state controls. Holland's government also undertook constitutional change in 1950, by abolishing the Legislative Council, the upper house of parliament, on the grounds that it was ineffectual.

In 1951, Holland, having confronted locked out dockers and coal miners intent on what he called "industrial anarchy", called a snap election and was re-elected Prime Minister. In its second term, the National government signed the ANZUS defence agreement with Australia and the United States. Holland led his party to a third consecutive victory in 1954. Following ill health in 1957, Holland stepped down as Prime Minister to be replaced by Keith Holyoake.

== Early life ==
Sidney Holland was born in Greendale in the Canterbury region of the South Island, the youngest child and fourth son of a family of eight children. His father, Henry Holland, was a farmer and merchant, who served as Mayor of Christchurch between 1912 and 1919 and became the Reform Party MP for Christchurch North between 1925 and 1935. During the First World War, Holland enlisted as a territorial in the New Zealand Military Forces in 1915 and later rose to the rank of second lieutenant. He served with the New Zealand Field Artillery and saw action during the Battle of Messines, before being invalided home after contracted a severe illness. Due to his injuries, Holland was hospitalised for six months and lost a lung.

Holland was a prominent sportsman and sports administrator, representing Canterbury at provincial and inter-island level in hockey. After retiring from playing, he managed the New Zealand representative hockey team on an unbeaten tour of Australia in the 1932 and was a prominent hockey referee. After the war, Holland and one of his brothers established the Midland Engineering Company in Christchurch, which manufactured horticultural spray pumps and operated a profit-sharing scheme with its employees. Holland later married Florence Drayton in 1920 and the couple raised a family of two boys and two girls. According to his biographer Barry Gustafson, Holland was raised as a Methodist but later became an Anglican.

== Early political career ==
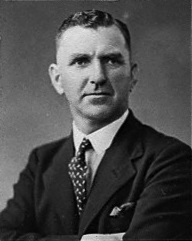
Holland in 1935

New Zealand Parliament
Years	Term	Electorate	Party
1935–1936	25th	Christchurch North	Reform
1936–1938	Changed allegiance to:		National
1938–1943	26th	Christchurch North	National
1943–1946	27th	Christchurch North	National
1946–1949	28th	Fendalton	National
1949–1951	29th	Fendalton	National
1951–1954	30th	Fendalton	National
1954–1957	31st	Fendalton	National

Following his father Henry Holland's election to the New Zealand Parliament in 1925, Sidney served as his father's unofficial private secretary and campaign manager between 1925 and 1935. Due to this experience, Holland gained an intimate knowledge and interest in parliamentary politics. During the Great Depression, Holland also became the President of both the Canterbury Employers' Association and the Christchurch Businessmen's Club, which brought into contact with the conservative New Zealand Legion and the short-lived Democrat Party, which opposed the Forbes–Gordon Coates United-Reform coalition Government. As a result of his political experiences, Holland developed a distaste for Communism.

After his father Henry was incapacitated in a serious accident, the older Holland encouraged Sidney to take his place as the Reform Party candidate for Christchurch North during the 1935 general elections. Holland successfully retained the Christchurch North seat despite the Labour Party's landslide victory during that election. The new Michael Joseph Savage–Peter Fraser Labour Government, which ushered in a raft of social and economic reforms including the establishment of a Keynesian welfare state, nationalization of key economic resources, and the expansion of public works and state-housing projects. In response to Labour's electoral success, the Reform and United Parties merged in 1936 to form the National Party, which represented the farming and growing manufacturing sectors of New Zealand society.

== Leader of the Opposition: 1940–1949 ==
In 1940, Holland replaced National's first non-interim leader Adam Hamilton as the leader of the National Party. Prior to becoming the Party's leader, he had served as Hamilton's parliamentary secretary. As leader of the National Party, Holland sought to win the support of the party's farming constituency by establishing a farm in North Canterbury and breeding Romney sheep and Aberdeen Angus cattle. In addition, he also countered other rival conservative parties like the Liberal Party, the Soldier's Movement, and the People's Movement by co-opting them into the National Party in 1941. This merger helped strengthen National's support base by unifying opposition to the Labour Party. Holland served as Leader of the Opposition for nearly ten years until the National Party won the 1949 general election. He represented the Christchurch North electorate from 1935 to 1946, and then the Fendalton electorate from 1946 to 1957.

Following Japan's entry into the Second World War in 1941, the Labour Government reluctantly acquiesced to the establishment of a bipartisan War Administration in July 1942, consisting of seven Labour Ministers and six National Ministers. Sidney Holland served as the Deputy Chairman of the short-lived War Cabinet, which collapsed in September 1942 after the National Party objected to Labour's handling of an unofficial miners' strike in the Waikato region that same month. Holland's decision strained relations with both the Labour Government and several National MPs including Gordon Coates and Adam Hamilton, who withdrew from the National caucus and rejoined the War Cabinet as independents. The resignation of these two former Reform Party MPs helped strengthen Holland's control over the party caucus and organisation.

During the 1943 and 1946 general elections, National slowly eroded Labour's parliamentary majority. While the Labour Party still remained in power, it was forced to contend with a more vigorous opposition National Party. Under Holland's leadership, National repeatedly attacked the Labour Party's socialism, "big government" bureaucracy, collectivism, and the power of the trade unions. Some important policies propagated by the National Party included individual freedom, a free market, minimum bureaucratic intervention, restriction and regulation, and an acceptance of the welfare state. Holland repositioned the National Party to accept (albeit reluctantly) the main elements of Labour's welfare state, a policy switch seen as necessary for the party to become electable. During the successful 1949 general election, Holland capitalised on the threat of Communist expansion in Eastern Europe, the government's perceived unwillingness to counter the militant waterfront unions, persisting wartime restrictions, and rising inflation. This strategy secured National's electoral victory on 30 November 1949.

== Prime Minister, 1949–1957 ==
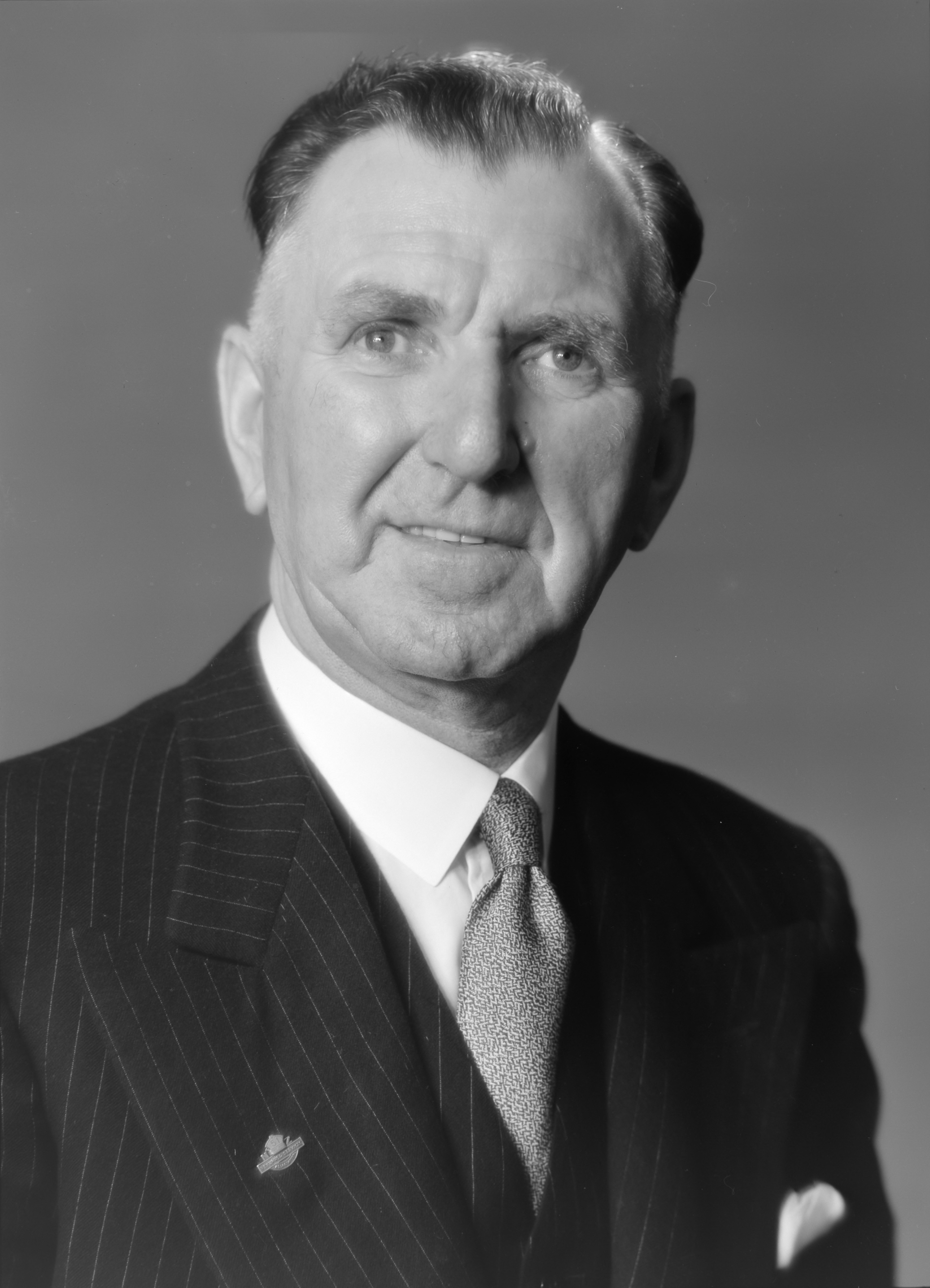
Holland in 1951

=== First term, 1949–1951 ===
The Sidney Holland National Government implemented economic reforms, dismantling many state controls including butter and petrol rationing. His government also emphasised individualism, personal freedom, and private enterprise in accordance with its 1949 electoral platform. One of Holland's first acts as Prime Minister was to abolish the Legislative Council, the upper house of the country's Parliament on 1 December 1950. As a result, the New Zealand Parliament became a unicameral body consisting solely of the House of Representatives. Besides serving as Prime Minister, Holland also served as the Minister of Finance. However, Holland did not carry on with his Party's promise to abolish compulsory unionism, which Labour had introduced in 1936. Due to opposition from several trade unions, the government compromised by simply passing a law forcing unions to obtain majority support in a vote before the union could make donations to the opposition Labour Party, which was traditionally associated with the trade unions.

In 1950, the National Government reinstated the death penalty, which had been phased out by the previous Labour Government in 1935 and abolished for murder in 1941. Another eight executions were carried out through Holland's administration (out of 36 murder convictions, 22 of whom had resulted in a death sentence). To solve the partisan-infected issue Holland called for a referendum to be held on the same day as the general election of 1957, but the proposal failed to make the ballot. No executions were carried out under Holland's successor, Keith Holyoake, and in 1961 Holyoake oversaw a vote in which Parliament voted 41–30 (with eleven National MPs crossing the floor) to abolish capital punishment for murder.

In 1951, Prime Minister Sidney Holland faced a major challenge from the militant Waterside Workers' Union during the 1951 waterfront dispute (13 February – 11 July 1951). The 1951 waterfront dispute was sparked by the refusal of shipowners to give a 15 per cent wage rise to the watersiders who proceeded to ban overtime work. The shipowners retaliated by imposing a lock-out on striking workers. When the watersiders refused to accept arbitration, the National Government imposed emergency regulations under the 1932 Public Safety Conversation Act which drastically curtailed civic liberties, including the freedom of speech and expression. The Regulations were designed to silence and criminalise any support for the watersiders, including food supplies for their families, and pro-watersider publications. In addition, Holland ordered the armed forces to unload cargo from ports and deregistered the Waterside Union and seized its funds. After 151 days, the watersiders capitulated.

The National Government's actions were popular with the public and press. The opposition Labour Party and the Federation of Labour, the national trade union-governing body, also acquiesced to the government's tough stance on the watersiders due to their acrimonious relationship with the Waterside Union. After the Labour opposition criticised the government's policy, Holland called a snap election on 11 July 1951. The National Party was re-elected with an increased majority, with the backing of a largely conservative Press and the state-controlled radio broadcasters. According to former journalist and historian Redmer Yska, Prime Minister Holland and his government exploited anti-Communist sentiment during the waterfront dispute. Due to the Cold War atmosphere emerging in New Zealand, Holland was able to depict the watersiders as part of the "Red Peril" that was threatening Western democracy. According to the historian Barry Gustafson, the 1949 and 1951 elections marked the peak of Sidney Holland's political career. The National Party was to stick with his extremely tough attitude towards unions for decades.

=== Second term, 1951–1954 ===
After 1951 the National Government continued its policy of deregulating the economy by ending rationing on basic food commodities, loosening import controls, and encouraging home ownership by selling state houses to their tenants. Shortly after being re-elected, the government also enacted the Police Offences Bill which gave the police substantial powers to deal with future industrial unrest. Holland's Government also reformed the superannuation scheme to enable retiring public servants to claim a portion of their entitlement as a lump sum payment. In addition, the Government established producer-controlled agricultural boards. Despite its centre-right orientation, the National Government maintained the previous Labour Government's policies of full employment and the welfare state. While the 1950s was a boom time for New Zealand and other Western economies, inflation remained a problem.

On the foreign policy front, the National Government embedded New Zealand in a series of Western Cold War security alliances and defence agreements. In September 1951, the government signed the ANZUS defence agreement with Australia and the United States. As a member of the Western alliance, the National Government also sent New Zealand troops to the Korean War. A demand for woollen clothing during the conflict created a brief economic boom for New Zealand's sheep farmers. In September 1954, New Zealand ratified the Manila Pact and joined the Southeast Asia Treaty Organization, an American-sponsored regional collective defense organisation aimed at combating the spread of Communism in Southeast Asia. Later, in January 1955, New Zealand's traditional ties to Britain and a fear of the Communist domino effect led Prime Minister Holland to contribute New Zealand troops to the Malayan Emergency. According to the historian David McIntyre, Holland had little interest in foreign affairs and was the first Prime Minister to delegate that portfolio to another cabinet minister. During the Holland era, New Zealand had three foreign ministers: Frederick Doidge, Clifton Webb, and Tom Macdonald.

At the 1954 general election, National's support declined, due to public dissatisfaction with the rising cost of living and housing. Altogether the party's vote dropped by nearly 100,000 from the 1951 electoral figure. The National Party also had to contend (as it had not needed to do in 1951) with a new third party: the Social Credit Political League, which won 122,573 votes. In addition, the Labour Party polled more votes than National but failed to reduce National's numerical majority in Parliament; the country's First-past-the-post voting system enabled it to maintain a majority of 10 electorate seats. Besides, Gustafson suggests that the appearance of Social Credit split the opposition vote.

During the electoral campaign, in what was to be a portent of his 1956–57 troubles, Holland's health deteriorated markedly. He kept losing his voice, forcing him to limit his speeches to half an hour. Following the 1954 election, the National Government set up a royal commission to examine the country's monetary system. This commission released a report condemning Social Credit theories.

In 1953, Holland was awarded the Queen Elizabeth II Coronation Medal.

=== Third term, 1954–1957 ===
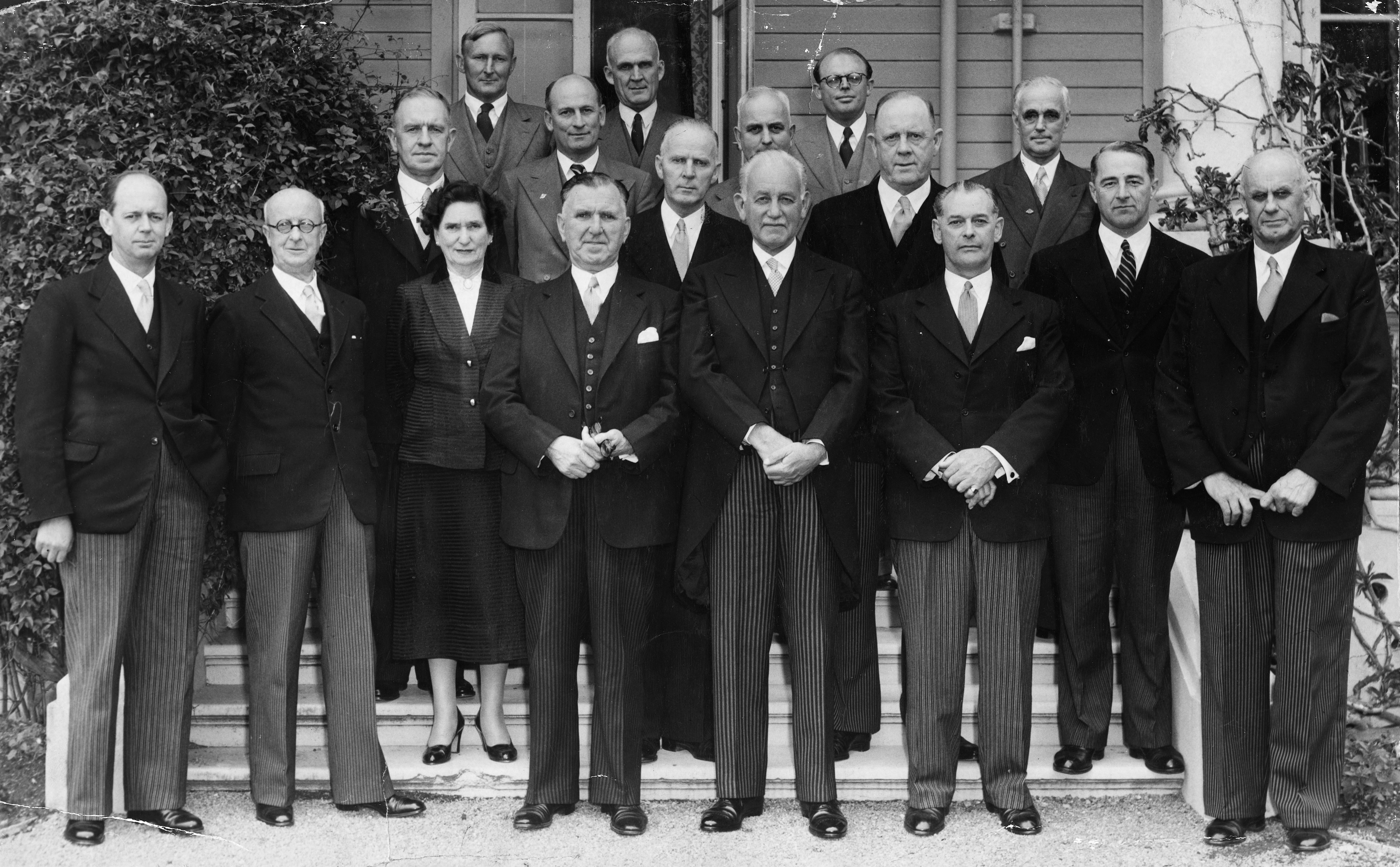
Holland and other Cabinet ministers with the Governor-General, Sir Willoughby Norrie, at Government House, 27 November 1954

Once the National Government had been assured of a third consecutive term, Holland gave up the finance portfolio to Jack Watts, the former Minister of Industries and Commerce. With the loss of one National MP (W.F. Fortune) and the retirement of several older ministers, Holland rejuvenated his Cabinet with several younger men including Dean Eyre, Sid Smith, John McAlpine, Tom Shand, Geoff Gerard, and Eric Halstead. In 1955 the annual terminal income tax assessment system was phased out in favour of a Pay As You Earn (PAYE) system. Also, the Tourist Hotel Corporation was established with Holland's strong support and against the opposition of Holyoake (by this time Deputy Prime Minister), who feared that tourism would divert investment away from agriculture. After Dean Eyre went on a private overseas business trip in 1956, Holland introduced a code of ethics that banned any conflict of interest between a minister's public duty and private affairs.

During Holland's last years in office, New Zealand also faced a serious balance of payments crisis that had been precipitated by a rapid decline in overseas demand for the country's butter, wool, and cheese exports. In addition, Holland's health was proving less and less able to withstand the strain of his duties, and his memory began to fail him. Amid the Suez Crisis in October 1956, Holland suffered a mild heart attack or stroke (accounts vary) while working in his office. However, far from retreating to bed, he insisted on remaining at the office for the next 48 hours until the crisis was resolved. According to his biographer Gustafson, Holland's physique never fully recovered from that incident. During the Suez Crisis, New Zealand and Australia were among the few countries to defend the Anglo-French invasion of the Suez Canal.

Despite his conspicuous medical problems, Holland was initially reluctant to hand over the Party's leadership to his deputy, Holyoake. But following a meeting the following year with several senior National Party officials including Holyoake himself, John Marshall, Jack Watts, and the Party's President Alex McKenzie, Holland reluctantly agreed to resign as Prime Minister and Leader of the Party.

On 12 August 1957, Holland announced his retirement at the National Party's annual conference in Wellington. Once he had made that announcement, he became so obviously sick that he had to be helped back to his hotel, where a doctor was called. The following day, Holyoake was formally named Holland's successor. Holland handed over the Prime Ministry to Holyoake on 20 September. Shortly afterwards, on 23 September, he was appointed a Knight Grand Cross of the Order of the Bath. He remained in Cabinet, as minister without portfolio; but he left the legislature for good at the 1957 general election, in which Holyoake went down to defeat, and which saw the advent of a second Labour Government under Walter Nash.

== Later life and death ==
Following his departure from parliament, Holland suffered continual ill health. He died in Wellington Hospital in 1961. His son Eric Holland became a National MP for Fendalton and Riccarton (1967–81) and a cabinet minister (1975–78) in Robert Muldoon's first administration.

== See also ==
- Cabinet of New Zealand
- List of New Zealand ministries

== Notes ==
Government offices
Preceded by Peter Fraser	Prime Minister of New Zealand; 1949–1957	Succeeded by Keith Holyoake
Political offices
Preceded by Peter Fraser	Minister of Police; 1949–1950; 1954–1956	Succeeded by Wilfred Fortune
Preceded by Wilfred Fortune	Minister of Police; 1949–1950; 1954–1956	Succeeded by Dean Eyre
New Zealand Parliament
Preceded by Henry Holland	Member of Parliament for Christchurch North; 1935–1946	In abeyance Title next held by Mike Moore
New constituency	Member of Parliament for Fendalton; 1946–1957	Succeeded by Jack Watts
