= 1937 in New Zealand =

- Decades: 1910s; 1920s; 1930s; 1940s; 1950s
- See also: History of New Zealand; List of years in New Zealand; Timeline of New Zealand history

The following lists events that happened during 1937 in New Zealand.

== Population ==
- Estimated population as of 31 December: 1,601,800.
- Increase since 31 December 1936: 17,200 (1.09%).
- Males per 100 females: 103.1.

== Incumbents ==
=== Regal and viceregal ===
- Head of State – George VI
- Governor-General – The Viscount Galway GCMG DSO OBE PC

=== Government ===
The 25th New Zealand Parliament continued with the Labour Party in government.

- Speaker of the House – Bill Barnard (Labour Party)
- Prime Minister – Michael Joseph Savage
- Minister of Finance – Walter Nash
- Minister of Foreign Affairs – Michael Joseph Savage
- Attorney-General – Rex Mason
- Chief Justice – Sir Michael Myers

=== Parliamentary opposition ===
- Leader of the Opposition – Adam Hamilton (National Party).

=== Main centre leaders ===
- Mayor of Auckland – Ernest Davis
- Mayor of Wellington – Thomas Hislop
- Mayor of Christchurch – John Beanland
- Mayor of Dunedin – Edwin Thomas Cox

== Events ==
- 16 January – The Hawke's Bay Herald publishes its final issue before merging with the Hawke's Bay Tribune to form the Hawke's Bay Herald-Tribune (now part of Hawke's Bay Today). It started as the Hawke's Bay Herald and Ahuriri Advocate in 1857.
- 1 February – The 1937 New Year Honours are announced.
- 11 May – The King George VI Coronation Honours are announced.
- Milk in schools (a half pint daily for each primary school pupil) starts, and continues until 1967.

== Arts and literature ==
See 1937 in art, 1937 in literature

=== Music ===
See: 1937 in music

=== Broadcasting ===
- 6 May – Historic radio link up to cover the arrival of Airship Hindenburg at New Jersey (and hence its destruction by fire). This is probably the first direct international radio broadcast of this nature from such a distance.

See: Public broadcasting in New Zealand

=== Film ===
- New Zealand Review no.1, Holiday Sounds

See: Category:1937 film awards, 1937 in film, List of New Zealand feature films, Cinema of New Zealand, Category:1937 films

== Sport ==
=== Chess ===
- The 46th National Chess Championship was held in Auckland, and was won by H.R. Abbott of Christchurch.

=== Golf ===
- The 27th New Zealand Open championship was won by J.P. Hornabrook, an amateur, in a three-way playoff with A.J. Shaw and Ernie Moss.
- The 41st National Amateur Championships were held in Hamilton
  - Men: B.M. Silk (Wanganui) – his second title
  - Women: Mrs G.W. Hollis

=== Horse racing ===
==== Harness racing ====
- New Zealand Trotting Cup – Lucky Jack
- Auckland Trotting Cup – Willow Wave

=== Lawn bowls ===
The national outdoor lawn bowls championships are held in Wellington.

- Men's singles champion – C. Spearman (Sydenham Bowling Club)
- Men's pair champions – D. Hunter, J.W. Lowry (skip) (Petone Bowling Club)
- Men's fours champions – C.H. Elsom, P. Munn, C.J. Shaw, R. Haworth (skip) (Canterbury Bowling Club)

=== Rugby ===
Category:Rugby union in New Zealand, Category:All Blacks

- Ranfurly Shield

=== Rugby league ===
New Zealand national rugby league team

=== Soccer ===
- Chatham Cup competition not held this year.
- An England Amateurs team toured, beating the New Zealand side by a resounding 30–1 aggregate in a three-match series.
  - 5 May, Dunedin: NZ 0–12 England Amateurs
  - 19 May, Auckland: NZ 0–6 England Amateurs
  - 26 May, Wellington: NZ 1–12 England Amateur
- Provincial league champions:
  - Auckland: Thistle
  - Canterbury: Technical OB, Western (shared)
  - Hawke's Bay: Napier Utd
  - Nelson: YMCA
  - Otago: Mosgiel
  - Southland: Boy's Brigade OB
  - Waikato: Hamilton Wanderers
  - Wanganui: Wanganui Athletic
  - Wellington: Waterside

== Births ==
=== January ===
- 1 January – Lance Pearson, cricketer, basketball player, coach and administrator (died 2019)
- 3 January – Archie Taiaroa, Māori leader (died 2010)
- 10 January – Ralph Caulton, rugby union player, coach and administrator (died 2024)
- 13 January – Guy Dodson, biochemist (died 2012)
- 14 January – Ann Chapman, limnologist (died 2009)
- 15 January – Ray Henwood, actor (died 2019)
- 16 January – Ahmed Said Musa Patel, Muslim cleric (died 2009)
- 21 January – Colin Barclay, cricketer (died 2009)
- 26 January
  - Murray Ball, cartoonist (died 2017)
  - Bruce McPhail, rugby union player (died 2020)
- 31 January – David Tarrant, cricketer

=== February ===
- 2 February
  - Tony Shelly, motor racing driver (died 1998)
  - Neale Thompson, cricketer, badminton player (died 2024)
- 19 February – Warwick Dalton, racing cyclist
- 23 February – David Kinsella, cricket player and umpire

=== March ===
- 4 March – Graham Dowling, cricketer
- 8 March
  - Barry Robinson, athlete, architect
  - Prince Tui Teka, singer, actor (died 1985)
- 10 March – John Creighton, rugby union player (died 2022)
- 11 March – John Ward, cricketer (died 2021)
- 13 March
  - Trevor Blake, cricketer, field hockey player (died 2004)
  - Chris Kenny, boxing coach (died 2016)
- 31 March – Jindra Tichá, academic, writer

=== April ===
- 1 April – Dent Harper, cricketer (died 1997)
- 2 April – John La Roche, civil engineer, author
- 3 April – Eve Rimmer, para athlete (died 1996)
- 5 April – Brian Blacktop, lawyer (died 2007)
- 7 April – Graeme Davies, metallurgist, university administrator (died 2022)
- 8 April – Philip Havill, cricketer
- 15 April – Bill Ballantine, marine biologist (died 2015)
- 16 April
  - David Braithwaite, politician (died 2021)
  - Ivan Keats, athlete (died 2020)
  - Don Oliver, weightlifter, fitness centre founder (died 1996)
- 18 April – Rangi Hetet, master carver (died 2024)
- 20 April – Ernest Barnes, field hockey player and coach
- 22 April
  - Michael Dormer, cricketer (died 2021)
  - Bruce Gregory, politician (died 2015)
  - Roger Slack, plant biologist and biochemist (died 2016)
- 29 April – Tīmoti Kāretu, Māori academic

=== May ===
- 4 May – Terry Shaw, cricketer and rugby union player (died 2026)
- 18 May – Ron Watson, sailor
- 20 May – Thomas Goddard, lawyer, judge (died 2019)

=== June ===
- 8 June – Michael Crozier, physicist, politician (died 2012)
- 20 June
  - David Lloyd, botanist (died 2006)
  - Phil Skoglund, lawn bowls player (died 2015)
- 21 June – John Kent, cartoonist (died 2003)
- 23 June – Greer Twiss, sculptor
- 24 June – Louise Clough, cricketer

=== July ===
- 2 July – Judith McKinlay, biblical scholar (died 2019)
- 9 July – Bill Kini, boxer, rugby union player (died 2012)
- 15 July – Judi Doull, cricketer
- 21 July – Barry Thomas, rugby union player (died 2018)
- 24 July
  - Te Wharehuia Milroy, Māori language academic (died 2019)
  - Barry Vercoe, computer scientist, composer (died 2025)
- 25 July – Rose Pere, educationalist, Māori language advocate, conservationist (died 2020)

=== August ===
- 1 August – Gugi Waaka, musical entertainer (died 2014)
- 2 August – Ron Brierley, businessman
- 4 August – Charmian O'Connor, physical organic chemist
- 7 August – Don McKay, rugby union player (died 2024)
- 9 August – Trevor Chinn, glaciologist (died 2018)
- 10 August
  - Ian Bradley, naval officer, politician (died 2015)
  - Valerie Young, athlete
- 17 August – Patricia Grace, author
- 19 August – Mick Brown, judge (died 2015)
- 21 August – Elizabeth Hanan, politician, community leader (died 2024)
- 24 August – Philip Newman, cricketer
- 26 August – John Veitch, cricketer (died 2009)
- 30 August – Bruce McLaren, racing driver and car designer (died 1970)

=== September ===
- 2 September – Frank Rapley, cricketer
- 7 September – Ngātata Love, business academic, Te Āti Awa leader (died 2018)
- 10 September – Dave Gallop, cricket player and administrator
- 11 September – Marilynn Webb, artist (died 2021)
- 14 September
  - Stuart Chambers, ornithologist
  - John Cullen, field hockey player
- 21 September – Denis Browne, Catholic bishop (died 2024)
- 22 September
  - Graham Houghton, missionary, educator (died 2022)
  - Trevor McKee, Thoroughbred racehorse trainer (died 2019)
- 23 September – Ross Morrison, cricketer (died 2025)
- 28 September
  - Graeme Caughley, ecologist (died 1994)
  - Vincent O'Sullivan, writer (died 2024)

=== October ===
- 5 October – Brian Maunsell, boxer (died 2021)
- 9 October – Richard Walls, businessman, politician (died 2011)
- 14 October – George Salmond, public health administrator (died 2019)
- 21 October – Robert Monteith, cricket umpire (died 1988)
- 23 October – Lawrie Creamer, milk protein chemist (died 2019)
- 27 October – Neville Huxford, cricketer (died 2006)
- 28 October – Jim Dawson, cricketer

=== November ===
- 2 November – Dylan Taite, music journalist (died 2003)
- 3 November – Peter Coutts, cricketer (died 2015)
- 4 November – Brian Edwards, broadcaster, author
- 12 November – Helen Thayer, explorer
- 13 November – Abdul Rahim Rasheed, Muslim community leader, lawyer (died 2006)
- 19 November
  - Meg Campbell, poet (died 2007)
  - Kenneth Keith, jurist (died 2026)
- 23 November – James Wallace, businessman, arts patron
- 25 November – Frances Cherry, writer (died 2022)

=== December ===
- 1 December – Bill Hume, association footballer (died 2005)
- 3 December – Peter Morris, cricketer
- 4 December – Ross Dallow, police officer, politician (died 2020)
- 5 December – Roger Douglas, politician
- 12 December – Grant Tilly, actor (died 2012)
- 25 December
  - Reese Griffiths, rugby league player (died 2016)
  - Ginger Molloy, motorcycle racer
- 26 December
  - Pam French, fencer
  - Gavin Hitchings, jeweller (died 2018)
- 29 December
  - Ian Lawrence, lawyer, politician (died 2019)
  - Ethna Rouse, cricketer (died 2023)

=== Undated ===
- Bridget Armstrong, actor
- Mary Cresswell, poet
- Peter Dwyer, zoologist, anthropologist
- Michael Harlow, poet, publisher, editor, librettist
- Ken Maddock, anthropologist (died 2003)
- Toi Te Rito Maihi, artist (died 2022)
- Reihana Parata, master weaver
- Jim Peters, politician
- Pauline Rhodes, artist
- Judy Siers, writer, historian
- Allan Wallbank, politician
- Judy Wilson, sculptor and fibre artist
- Spiro Zavos, cricketer, journalist, writer

== Deaths ==
- 20 February: Rua Kenana Hepetipa, Māori prophet.
- 5 March: Sir Frederic Lang, politician – 8th Speaker of the House of Representatives.
- 29 May: Charles Hall, politician.
- 19 October: Sir Ernest Rutherford, physicist.
- 27 October: Thomas Field, politician.
- 16 November: John Lillicrap, 29th Mayor of Invercargill.
- 29 November: John Jenkinson, politician.

== See also ==
- History of New Zealand
- List of years in New Zealand
- Military history of New Zealand
- Timeline of New Zealand history
- Timeline of New Zealand's links with Antarctica
- Timeline of the New Zealand environment
