= Islam in New Zealand =

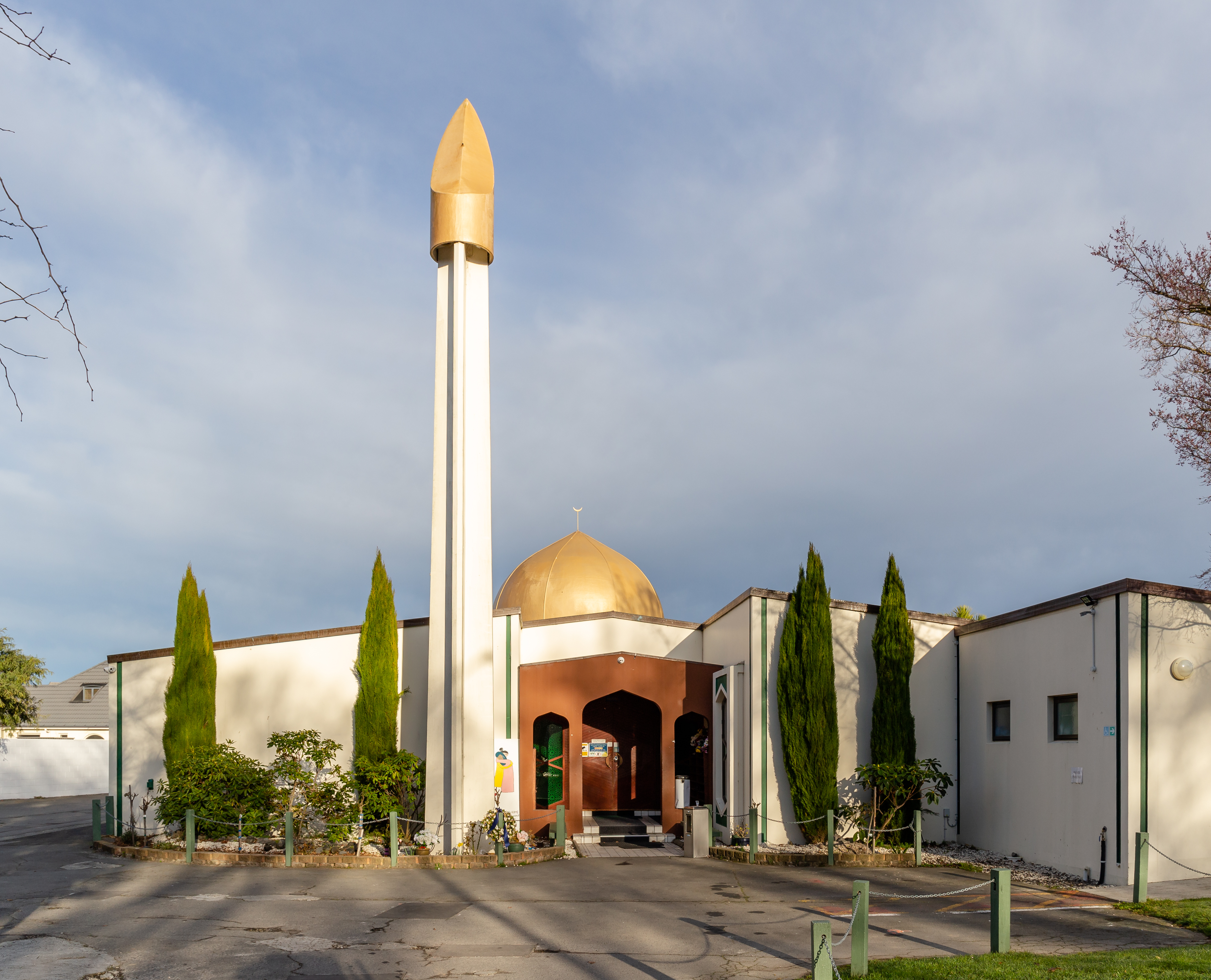
Al Noor Mosque in Christchurch, New Zealand is the first mosque built in the South Island in 1985, and it was the world's southernmost mosque until 1999.

Islam is the third-largest religion in New Zealand (1.5%) after Christianity (32.3%) and Hinduism (2.9%). Small numbers of Muslim immigrants from South Asia and eastern Europe settled in New Zealand from the early 1900s until the 1960s. Large-scale Muslim immigration began in the 1970s with the arrival of Indian Fijians, followed in the 1990s by refugees from various war-torn countries.

According to the 2023 New Zealand census, there are 75,144 Muslim New Zealanders, representing 1.5% of the total population.

The first Islamic centre in New Zealand opened in 1959 and there are now several mosques and two Islamic schools. The majority of Muslims in New Zealand are Sunni, with significant Shia and Ahmadiyya minorities. The Ahmadiyya Community has translated the Qur'an into the Māori language.

== History ==
Historical population
Year	Pop.	±%
1945	67	—
1951	205	+206.0%
1956	200	−2.4%
1961	260	+30.0%
1966	551	+111.9%
1971	779	+41.4%
1976	1,415	+81.6%
1981	2,004	+41.6%
1986	2,544	+26.9%
1991	5,772	+126.9%
1996	13,545	+134.7%
2001	23,631	+74.5%
2006	36,072	+52.6%
2013	46,149	+27.9%
2018	57,276	+24.1%

=== Early migration, 19th century ===
The earliest Muslim presence in New Zealand dates back to the late 19th century. The first Muslims in New Zealand were an Indian family who settled in Cashmere, Christchurch, in the 1850s. The 1874 government census reported 15 Chinese Muslim gold diggers working in the Dunstan gold fields of Otago in the 1870s. The first Muslim to be buried in New Zealand was a Javanese sailor named Mohamed Dan, who died in Dunedin in 1888. The anthropologist Erich Kolig also speculates that a few Muslim sailors from Southeast Asia and South Asia may have settled in New Zealand during that period.

Most of the early Muslim migrants settled in major centres like Auckland and Christchurch. In 1890, a group of Punjabi Muslim migrants including Sheik Mohamed Din settled in Christchurch. Other notable migrants including the Turkmen Saleh Mohamed and his father Sultan (who both settled in Christchurch in 1905), the Gujarati immigrant Ishamel Ahmed Bhikoo (who became a shopkeeper in Auckland), Essop Moosa, and Muhammad Suleiman Kara (who settled in Christchurch). According to Kolig, Bhikoo and Moses also brought relatives to New Zealand.

=== Modern migration, 20th and 21st centuries ===
In 1920, New Zealand adopted a restrictive immigration policy that limited Asian immigration. The Muslim population remained less than a hundred until after the Second World War. In 1945, there were 67 recorded Muslims in New Zealand. In 1951, the refugee boat SS Goya brought over 60 Muslim men from Albania and Yugoslavia, boosting the Muslim population to 205.

Between 1961 and 1971, the Muslim population increased from 260 to 779. The Muslim community in New Zealand continued to grow during the 1970s and 1980s, reaching around 2,000 by 1979 and 2,500 by 1986. Large-scale Muslim immigration began with the arrival of mainly working class Indo-Fijians in the 1970s. They were followed by professionals after the first Fiji coup of 1987. During the 1990s many migrants were admitted under New Zealand's refugee quota, from war zones in Somalia, Bosnia, Afghanistan, Kosovo and Iraq. There are also a significant number of Muslims from Iran who live in New Zealand.

== Religious life and institutions ==
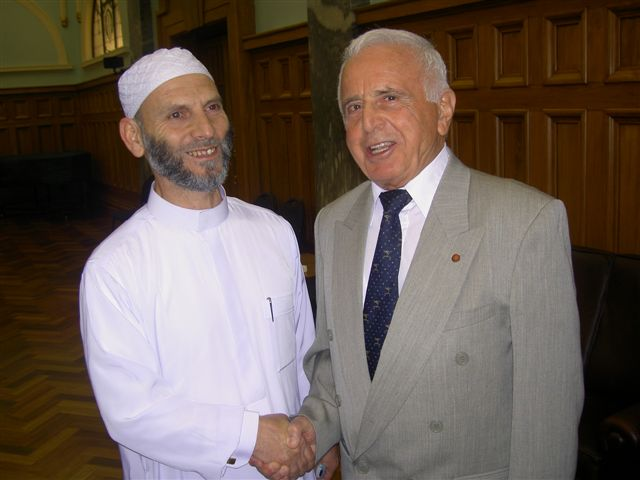
Sheikh Airot, previous imam of Ponsonby Mosque (Auckland), and Mazhar Krasniqi at the Silver Jubilee celebrations of the Federation of Islamic Associations of New Zealand, 16 November 2005, Parliament House, Wellington

New Zealand has several mosques and Islamic centres and trusts in the major centres, and two Islamic schools (Al Madinah and Zayed College for Girls) in Auckland. Auckland alone has about 15 Islamic centres, mosques, and trusts.

=== Organisations ===
The Federation of Islamic Associations of New Zealand (FIANZ) is the national umbrella organisation that represents the Muslim community in New Zealand. FIANZ is affiliated with seven regional organisations, trusts, and most mosques and Islamic centres in New Zealand. FIANZ was founded in April 1979 by Mazhar Krasniqi, who brought together the three regional Muslim organisations of Canterbury, Wellington and Auckland. He was honoured for his efforts by the New Zealand government in 2002, receiving a Queens Service Medal.

Later Hajji Ashraf Choudhary served as president (1984–85) before pursuing a political career and entering the New Zealand Parliament in 1999. (However, Choudhary would separate his religion from politics, in line with New Zealand secularism). In 2008, FIANZ established the Harmony Awards "as part of Islam Awareness Week to recognise the contributions of New Zealanders to improving understanding and relationships between Muslims and the wider community".

The FIANZ is affiliated with seven regional associations including the New Zealand Muslim Association (NZMA), the South Auckland Muslim Association (SAMA), the Waikato Muslim Association (WMA), the Manawatu Muslim Association (MMA), the International Muslim Association of New Zealand (IMAN), the Muslim Association of Canterbury (MAC), and the Otago Muslim Association. Other Muslim organisations have included the predominantly Fijian Indian Anjuman Himayat al-Islam, the University of Otago's Muslim Student Association (MUSA), the Ahmadiyya Jama'at New Zealand, and the Southland Muslim Association.

== Demography ==
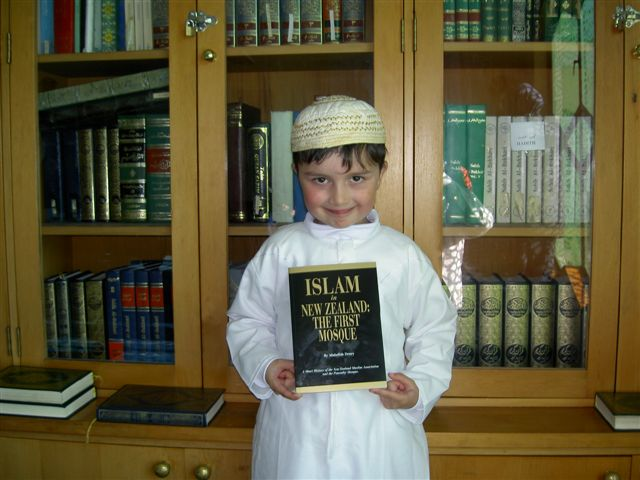
New Zealand Muslim boy in a Canterbury mosque in 2007

The number of Muslims in New Zealand according to the 2018 census is 57,276, up 24% from 46,149 in the 2013 census. The majority of New Zealand Muslims are Sunnis but there is a large number of Shias who live in New Zealand, concentrated mainly in Auckland (the largest city of New Zealand). In recent years Shia Muslims have become active holding Ashura commemoration programmes in Auckland parks. The first of these was conducted by the Fatima Zahra Charitable Association on 19 January 2008.

There are significant communities of Muslims from the Middle East (Turkey and Lebanon), South Asia (Pakistan, India and Bangladesh) and Southeast Asia. There is also a large Indo-Fijian Muslim community and an equally substantial Somali minority in New Zealand. Contrary to popular assertions from various community leaders, no one single ethnic group can claim to contribute more than half of the New Zealand Muslim population. The majority of Muslims in New Zealand are concentrated in the major cities of Auckland, Hamilton, Wellington, and Christchurch.

From the mid-1990s, an influx of Malay students from Malaysia and Singapore has increased the proportion of Muslims in some other centres, notably the university city of Dunedin. Dunedin is home to a mosque called Al-Huda mosque, which is run by the Otago Muslim Association. As of 2019, the southernmost mosque in New Zealand is the Southland Muslim Association Masjid/Community Centre in Invercargill.

=== Māori Muslims ===
Islam was estimated to be the fastest growing religion among the Māori, however recently there is only a growth of 39 individuals in 12 years between 2006 and 2018. Census figures showing the number of Muslims of Māori ethnicity increasing from 99 to 708 from 1991 to 2001. The Māori Muslim population thereafter virtually stabilised from 1,077 in 2006 to 1,083 in 2013 to 1,116 in 2018. Te Amorangi Izhaq Kireka-Whaanga, leader of the Aotearoa Maori Muslim Association, views tino rangatiratanga as a form of jihad, and Islam as "the perfect vehicle for Māori nationalism". The leader of the AMMA, Sheikh Eshaq Te Amorangi Morgan Kireka-Whaanga was identified in 2010 among the top 500 most influential Muslims. In 2004 Sheikh Eshaq led the Quran Tilawat at the "National Islamic Converts Conference" at the Canterbury mosque in Christchurch. The Ahmadiyya Community has translated the Qur'an into the Māori language, Te Reo.

=== Pacific Islanders ===
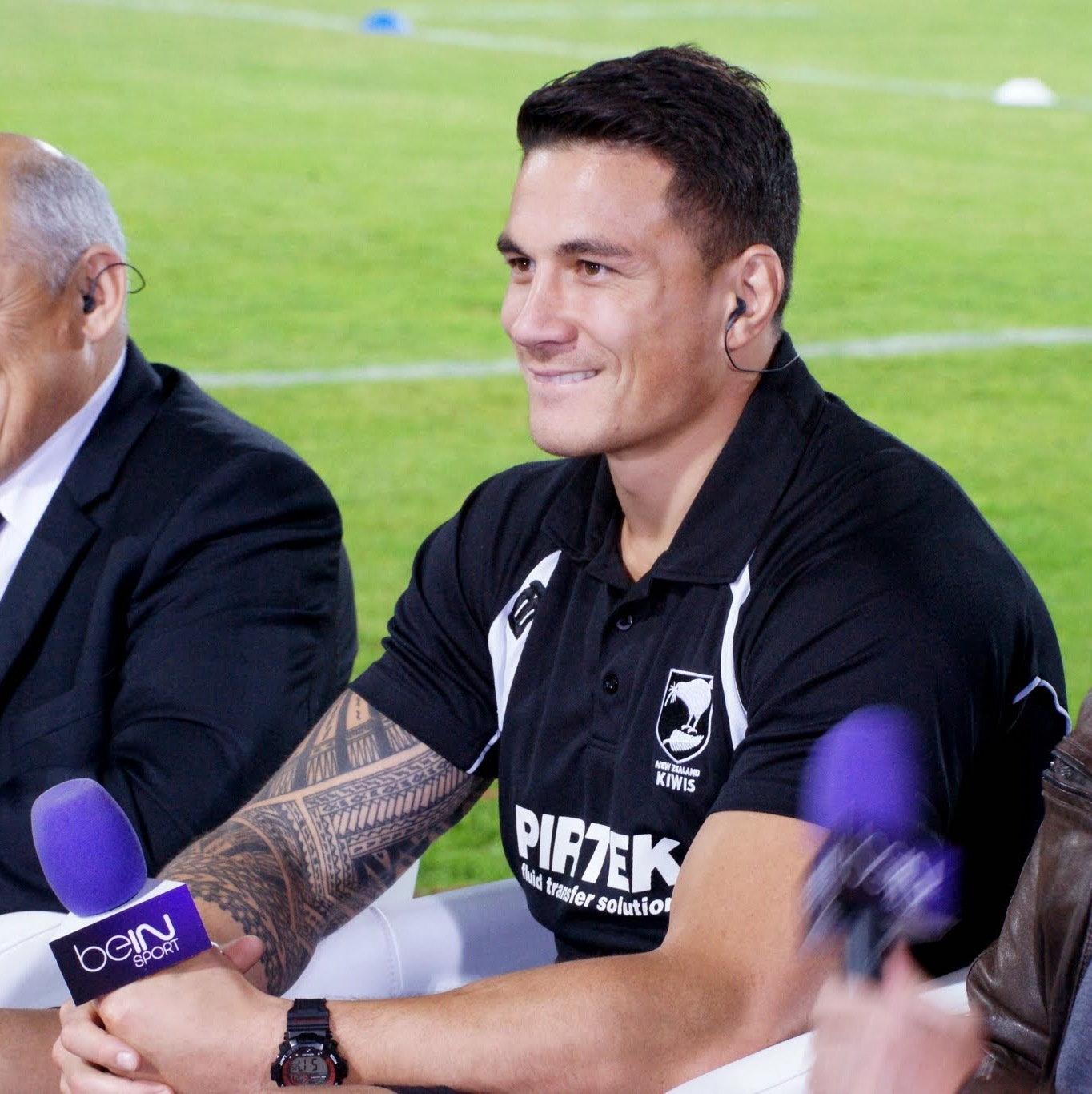
Sonny Bill Williams, Muslim rugby player and heavyweight boxer

While New Zealand's overall Pacific Islander community grew 15% according to census data from 2001 to 2006, Muslim Pacific Islanders grew 87.43%. According to 2013 census data, there were 1,536 Muslims among the Pacific islander community (a little under 3.5% of New Zealand's Muslim population). It increased to 1,866 Muslims in 2018.

One Muslim from this community is a rugby player and heavyweight boxer, Sonny Bill Williams, as well as fellow All Black player Ofa Tu'ungafasi.

=== Europeans ===
According to 2013 census data, there were 4,353 Muslims (about 9.5% of the total Muslim population) among the European community (Pākehā). It decreased to 3,693 Muslims in 2018 Census.

== Issues ==
=== Muhammad cartoons controversy ===
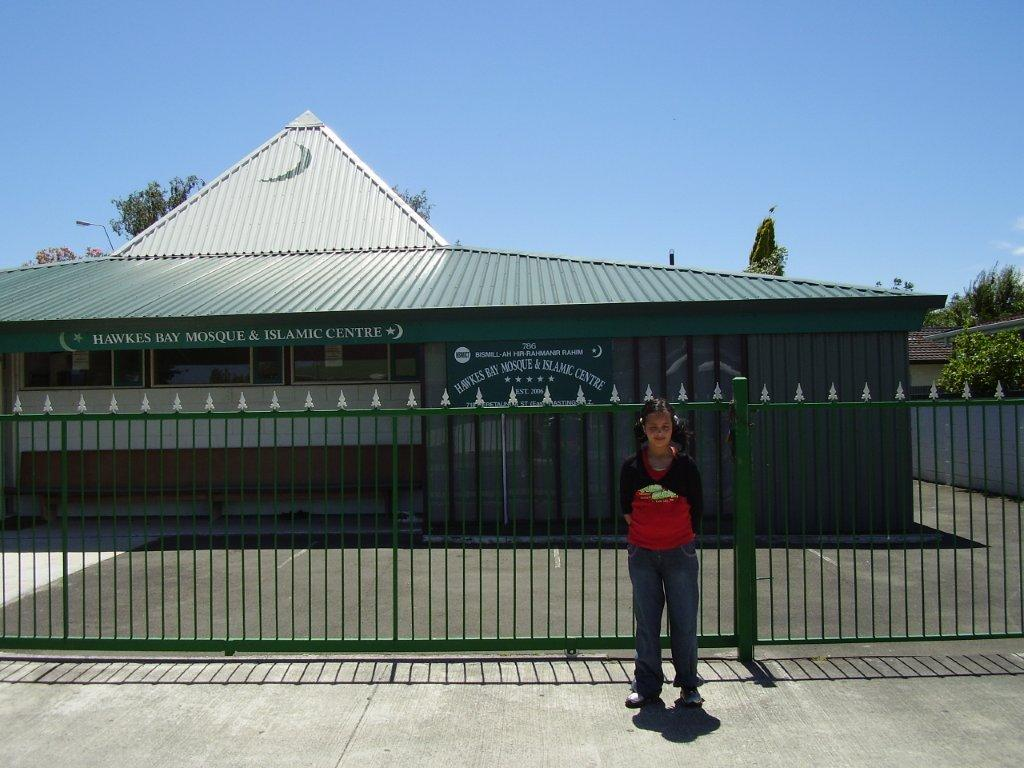
Hawkes Bay Mosque, Hastings

In 2006, two newspapers in New Zealand republished controversial Danish cartoons depicting Muhammad, the prophet of Islam. The Muslim community registered its displeasure through press statements and a small peaceful march in Auckland. The editors said they did not mean offence but would not back down. Prime Minister Helen Clark and opposition leader Don Brash both made statements that the cartoons were not appreciated if they deeply offended members of the New Zealand community, but that such decisions were for editors to make, not politicians. Muslim leaders and the newspaper editors met with the Race Relations office, and Jewish and Christian representatives in Wellington. As a result of this meeting the editors said they would not apologise but in good faith would refrain from publishing the offending images again. The New Zealand Muslim leadership, through the Federation of Islamic Associations of New Zealand (FIANZ), then considered the matter closed and drafted letters to 52 Muslim countries reversing their earlier stance and asking that New Zealand products not be boycotted.

=== Further controversies ===
In November 2016, Mohammad Anwar Sahib, the Imam of the Al-Taqwa mosque in Manukau, Auckland and a religious adviser to the FIANZ, drew controversy when he made offensive remarks about Jews, Christians, and women in a series of speeches that were posted by blogger Cameron Slater on YouTube. Sahib's comments were condemned by a wide range of figures and groups in New Zealand society including the FIANZ's President Hazim Arafeh, the Islamic Women's Council of New Zealand (IWCNZ), the Race Relations Commissioner Dame Susan Devoy, the Ethnic Communities Minister Sam Lotu-Iiga, the ACT party's David Seymour, New Zealand First leader Winston Peters, the New Zealand Jewish Council, and the Ahmadiyya community. In response to negative publicity, Sahib was dismissed from his advisory position at the FIANZ. Sahib denied accusations of racism and issued a statement claiming that his statements had been taken out of context.

In late October 2017, the media reported that the first secretary of the Iranian Embassy Hormoz Ghahremani, the visiting Iranian cleric Hojatoleslam Shafie, and community elder Sayed Taghi Derhami had made remarks denying the Holocaust and attacking Israel at the Shia Islamic Ahlulbayt Foundation in Pakuranga, Auckland during a meeting to commemorate Quds Day in June. A video of the speeches had been posted on the Foundation's YouTube channel. These remarks were criticised by the New Zealand Jewish Council and the pro-Israel think tank the Israel Institute of New Zealand, who advocated Ghahremani's expulsion. Ghahremani later clarified that his actions represented the Iranian government's official position on Israel. Race Relations Commissioner Devoy also condemned the trio's antisemitic statements. The opposition New Zealand National Party's foreign affairs spokesperson Gerry Brownlee also urged the incumbent Labour-New Zealand First-Green coalition government to expel Ghahremani. In response, Foreign Minister Winston Peters countered that the incident had occurred under the previous National government's watch. Peters indicated that the Ministry of Foreign Affairs and Trade had summoned Ghahremani to express its disapproval.

=== Christchurch mosque shootings ===
On 15 March 2019 Brenton Tarrant attacked worshippers at two mosques in Christchurch, killing 51 people, including 42 at the Al Noor Mosque in Riccarton, 7 at the Linwood Islamic Centre, and 2 who died in hospital. The attacks took place on a Friday afternoon when worshippers inside the mosques were gathering for Jumu'ah. The perpetrator of the attack was an Australian described as a white supremacist who intended to create an "atmosphere of fear" against Muslims.

A week after the attack, a nationwide moment of silence was observed in New Zealand. The prayer and two-minute reflection were broadcast live on national media outlets and came as an estimated 20,000 people, including Prime Minister Jacinda Ardern, gathered metres from the Al Noor mosque in the city of Christchurch for Muslim Friday prayers. Gamal Fouda, an imam who survived the attack at Al Noor mosque, said "last Friday I stood in this mosque and saw hatred and rage in the eyes of the terrorist, but today from the same place I look out and I see the love and compassion in the eyes of thousands of New Zealanders and human beings from around the globe". Speaking to mourners in the crowd, Prime Minister Ardern said "New Zealand mourns with you. We are one". Quoting Muhammad, she said: "The believers in their mutual kindness, compassion, and sympathy are just like one body. When any part of the body suffers, the whole body feels pain." The event was condemned worldwide. New Zealand businesses and the community came together to combat discrimination among Muslims.

=== Queenstown mosque vandalism ===
On 23 December 2020, six posters depicting Muhammad taken from the French satirical magazine Charlie Hebdo and hostile messages were plastered on the Queenstown Islamic Centre, which had opened on 11 December. The Mayor of Queenstown-Lakes Jim Boult condemned the incident and apologised on behalf of Queenstown to the Muslim community. An 18-year-old teenager was subsequently arrested in connection with the incident and also charged with possessing a knife.

=== 2024 email threat against Muslim schools ===
On 9 September 2024, two Muslim schools (Al-Madinah School and Zayed College) in Mangere, Auckland went into lockdown after receiving an email threat. The email featured a video of man showing guns in a car and randomly shooting. A third Auckland Muslim school, Iqra Primary School, restricted access as a safeguard. Federation of Islamic Associations of New Zealand spokesperson Abdur Razzak said the email video threat brought back memories of the Christchurch mosque shootings in 2019 and urged the National-led government to reconsider its policies of downscaling the previous Labour-led government's national security settings and firearms legislation.

== Notable New Zealand Muslim figures ==
- Mohamed Awad, soccer player.
- Ahmed Bhamji, politician and businessman.
- Ashraf Choudhary, politician.
- Atta Elayyan, futsal player, coach, businessman, and developer. He was murdered in the Christchurch mosque shootings.
- Naila Hassan, police officer, Superintendent of New Zealand Police.
- Joel Hayward, scholar, writer and poet.
- Mazhar Krasniqi, community leader, businessman and human rights activist.
- Ibrahim Omer, Member of Parliament for the Labour Party from 2020 to 2023.
- Ajaz Patel, Indian-born New Zealand cricketer.
- Anjum Rahman, community leader and human rights activist.
- Abdul Rahim Rasheed, activist.
- Omar Slaimankhel, former professional rugby footballer
- Ofa Tu'ungafasi, rugby player.
- Sonny Bill Williams, heavyweight boxer, and a former professional rugby league and rugby union player.
- Haris Zeb, soccer player.
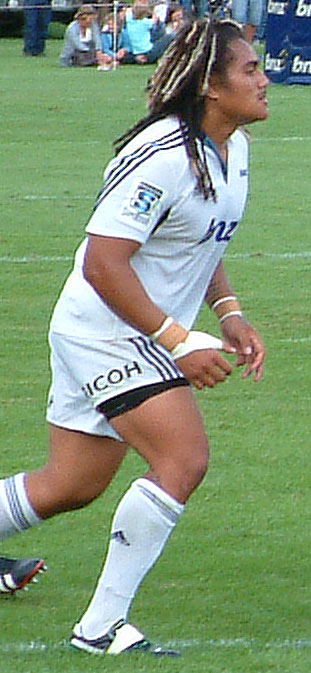
Ofa Tu'ungafasi is an All Black Rugby Union player born in Tonga.

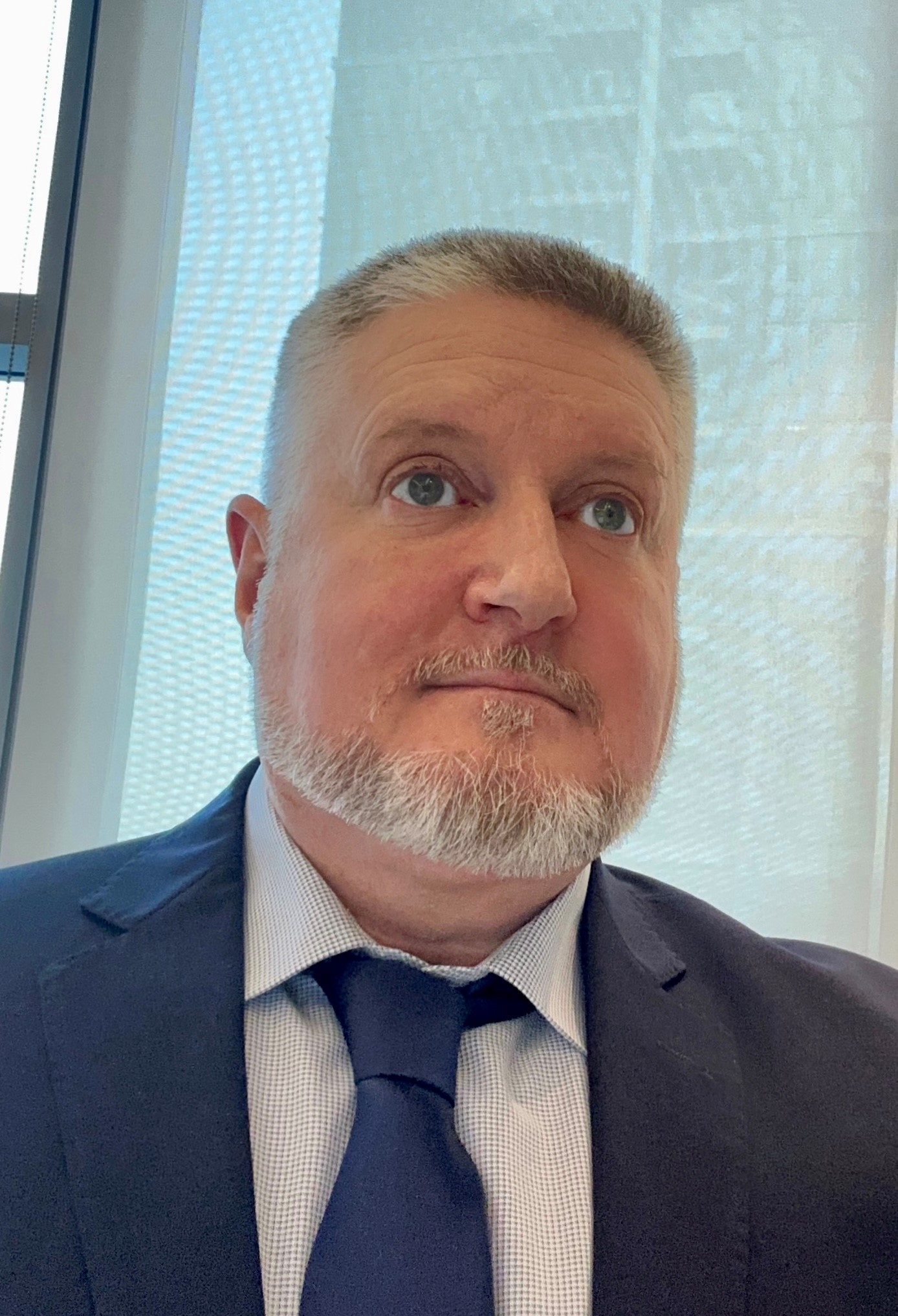
Joel Hayward is a New Zealand Islamic scholar born in Christchurch.

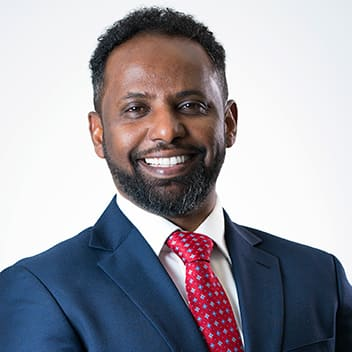
Ibrahim Omer, born in Eritrea, is a former member of Parliament for the Labour Party.

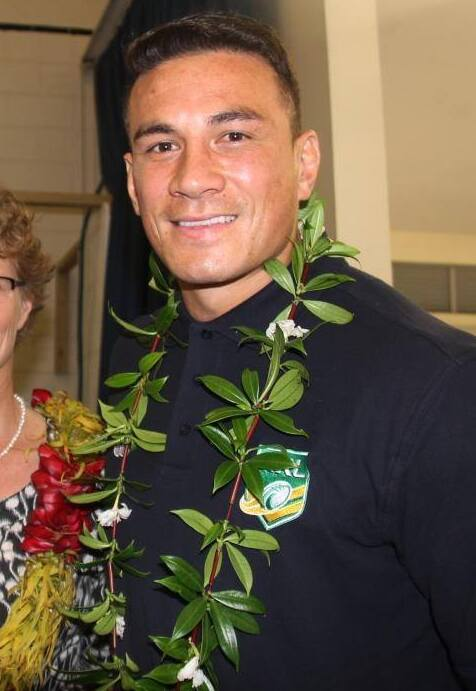
Sonny Bill Williams is a Muslim heavyweight boxer and former rugby player born in Auckland.

== See also ==
- Islam by country
- Religion in New Zealand
- List of mosques in New Zealand
