= Abdul Rahim Rasheed =

New Zealand lawyer (1938–2006)

Abdul Rahim Rasheed QSO (13 November 1937 – 3 October 2006) was a Fijian-born Indian Muslim community leader and lawyer in New Zealand.

== Upbringing and education ==
Abdul Rahim Rasheed was born in Fiji on 13 November 1937. In 1967 he migrated to New Zealand to study law at the University of Auckland where he gained an LL.B. degree and undertook the Law Professional exams in 1972. He practised as a barrister and solicitor of the High Court of New Zealand for over 21 years and is remembered for “introducing the mens rea ingredient to the offence of overstaying”.

== Career ==
In 1969 Rasheed and several Auckland based Indian Muslims from Fiji set up the Anjuman Himayat Al-Islami. Rasheed provided leadership and legal advice. Following negotiations with other Muslims in Auckland Muslim community it was agreed to formally dissolve the Anjuman and merge it into the older New Zealand Muslim Association (NZMA). In January 1977, Rasheed was appointed both president and legal advisor of the NZMA, whilst Avdo Musovich served as vice-president. M Hafiz Sidat and Maulana Ahmed Said Musa Patel served as the spiritual and religious advisors to the organisation. On 6 March 1977 the NZMA held its AGM in the 17 Vermont Street Islamic Centre in Ponsonby and Rasheed was confirmed as Association president. He subsequently held the job for ten years. In February 1987 Rasheed stood down from the post but was directly selected to be the Association Patron. He maintained this title until 1990.

In November 1979, the Auckland City Council sanctioned plans for the first purpose-built mosque in all New Zealand. Rasheed, Said Alvi, Patel, Mazhar Krasniqi and Hajji Mohammed Hussein Sahib all mortgaged their private homes in order to ensure the Association had enough money to follow the project through.

Elsewhere Muslims throughout New Zealand had initiated dialogue on the urgent necessity of creating a nationwide Islamic entity to represent all their collective communal aims, interests and objectives. In April 1979 the Federation of Islamic Associations of New Zealand (FIANZ) was established with Rasheed's friend and colleague from the NZMA, Mazhar Krasniqi, as the first president. Six months later in September 1979 Rasheed was voted president. Rasheed maintained this title until the FIANZ AGM of 6 April 1980, and was re-elected in April 1981 for two consecutive years. Under Rasheed the Federation devoted itself to the welfare of all Muslims, to efforts to educate the wider public about Islam as a faith and to the certification of Halal export meat. In May 1984 Rasheed was part of a ten-man delegation - alongside Dr Ashraf Choudhary, Mazhar Krasniqi, members of the New Zealand Meat Board and a representative of the Department of Trade and industry - to the UAE and Kuwait to resolve ongoing Halal issues. So FIANZ secured its first contract with the New Zealand Meat Producers Board in 1984 for $169,000. Today this contract generates annual income of over one million dollars. In January 1985 when the Federation sent a four-man delegation to attend the RISEAP AGM in Malaysia, Rasheed was selected to participate.

Rasheed featured regularly in the New Zealand media and was one of the first Muslims to respond and interact proactively. In December 1980 he was first interviewed by New Zealand Broadcasting Corporation, on the Auckland regional programme “Top Half” talking about the ongoing construction of the mosque in Ponsonby. He was also interviewed three years later on television in June 1983 for an item on Ramadan in New Zealand. Overall Rasheed featured prominently in various newspaper articles on Islam.

In 1992 Rasheed retired from many of this tasks owing to ill health, as well as from NZMA and FIANZ activities. He continued, hover, to participate in more modest community affairs and even furthered his own education. Rasheed had strong feelings about improving Christian-Muslim relationships for instance and was a founder (and later the patron) of the Auckland-based Council of Christians and Muslims (CCM). During this time he studied with Dr Douglas Pratt at the prestigious University of Waikato and in 1996 became a Bachelor of Theology (University of Auckland). Rasheed was interviewed by the New Zealand Herald for the occasion and articulated his belief that it was critical for Christians and Muslims to respect one another's dogmas. When Dr Pratt published his prominent book “The Challenge of Islam: Encounters in Interfaith Dialogue” in 2005, he honoured Rasheed by dedicating the monograph to his former student.

The Federation of Islamic Associations hosted a WAMY-sponsored South Pacific Islamic Youth Da’wah Training Course at Ponsonby Mosque in April 1999. This week-long gathering was organised by Rasheed and drew in over a hundred Muslim youth representing most of the South Pacific region. The Deputy Mayor of Auckland, the Reverend Dr Bruce Huckner, was the chief guest. Other interlocutors included Dr Hajji Mustapha Omari (from the Australian WAMY office) and Dr Pratt.

In the 2002 Queen's Birthday and Golden Jubilee Honours, Rasheed was appointed a Companion of the Queen's Service Order for community service.

== Death ==
On 3 October 2006 Abdul Rahim Rasheed died in Auckland. A Commemorative Dinner was undertaken at the Auckland Chancery Chambers on 1 December and this was attended by the Governor-General, several prominent government ministers (past and present), and many lawyers, judges, doctors, academics and other friends. A resolution was made to continue Rasheed's work in the creation of the Rasheed Memorial Da’wah Trust.

Waikato University academic Douglas Pratt, who lectured Rasheed at Auckland University and described him as "both my student and my teacher", said he was a voice for tolerance. "His whole philosophy as a Muslim leader was to say, 'Here in this country are many religions and it behoves us to (a) be good citizens, and (b) lead our religious lives in such a way that we can be good neighbours and live in dialogue.' "To that extent he was a unique voice," Pratt said.

== Literature ==
- Anne Elder, “Muslim locals strengthen faith”, Star Weekender, 24 July 1982, p. 10.
- Arif Rasheed, “Remembering a great humanitarian – Abdul Rahim Rasheed QSO”, NZ Lawyer, 15 December 2006, page 4.
- Sue Norton, “Muslim devotes life to inter-faith understanding”, The New Zealand Herald, 11 May 1996, p. 20 .
- Drury, Abdullah, Islam in New Zealand: The First Mosque (Christchurch, 2007)
- FIANZ Annual Report 2012 (Wellington – 2012).
- RASHEED, The New Zealand Herald, 4 October 2006, p. D7.
- Trickett, Peter. “Minarets in Ponsonby”, The New Zealand Herald, 21 April 1979, pp. 18–19.
