= Albanian New Zealanders =

New Zealanders with Albanian heritage

Albanian New Zealanders Shqiptarë Zelandez
Total population
- 249 (2018 census)

Regions with significant populations
- Auckland

Languages
- New Zealand English; Albanian

Religion
- No religion; Muslim (Sunni, Bektashi); Christianity

Related ethnic groups
- Albanians; Albanian diaspora

Albanian New Zealanders (Albanian: Shqiptarë Zelandez) are residents of New Zealand who are of Albanian heritage or descent, often from Kosovo, with smaller numbers from Albania and a few from North Macedonia. Albanian New Zealanders are mainly concentrated in the city of Auckland. The Albanian community has been present in New Zealand since the mid twentieth century and are an integrated part of its society.

== History ==
=== First phase: Post war refugees and immigrants ===
The first phase of Albanian migration to New Zealand occurred following the Second World War. In May 1951, Albanian Muslims formed a small group (over 60 individuals) among the large number of Eastern European refugees that came to New Zealand on the ship MS Goya through the support of the UN's International Refugee Organization (IRO). These Albanians mainly came from Albania and the rest from Yugoslavian Kosovo and Macedonia. Disembarking in Wellington, the refugees were processed for 6 weeks at a camp in Pahiatua and later given work placements throughout New Zealand. By 1953, most MS Goya refugees had relocated to Auckland including the Albanians for economic considerations, where their small community became established. The Albanians living in close proximity at the time founded an organisation Lidhjen e Qytetarëve Shqiptarë në Zelandë të Re (the League of Albanian Citizens in New Zealand or 'Albanian Civic League') with Mazhar Krasniqi as its long serving leader. In Auckland 1954, the Albanian community celebrated Albanian Independence Day (Flag Day). Holidays like Flag Day or gatherings on weekends became events where the Albanian community got to socialise with one another. Over time the Albanian Civic League assisted the New Zealand Albanian community to keep links with Albanian diaspora groups and prominent figures and to focus public attention on Albanian issues like Kosovo. There was also focus directed toward preserving the Albanian language and customs among the community.

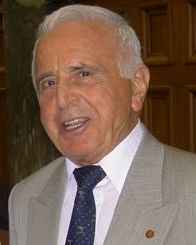
Mazhar Krasniqi, businessman and community leader

The Islam practised and brought by Albanians to New Zealand was influenced by the Ottoman era along with European secularism and those traits became reflected in the early New Zealand Muslim organisations they engaged in and contributed to establish. In the mid-1950s, Albanians served on the executive committee of the first local Muslim organisation, the New Zealand Muslim Association (NZMA) that later set up the first mosque in Auckland and influenced both their cultural development. Nazmi Mehmeti secured the first Muslim burial plot (1963) in Auckland. Albanians partook in the founding (1979) of the Federation of Islamic Associations of New Zealand (FIANZ) and imparted their moderate practice of Islam into the organisation. FIANZ's first president was Mazhar Krasniqi and later he also served as leader of the New Zealand Muslim Association. A few Albanians came during the 1970s and 1980s. Much of the post-war New Zealand Albanian community had minimal or tenuous links to local Muslim organisations. Albanians integrated into New Zealand due to its multicultural society and their ability to be mainly indistinguishable from the wider population.

=== Second phase: Kosovo refugees ===
During the 1990s, a few Albanians fleeing persecution and violence in Kosovo began to arrive to New Zealand. The second phase of Albanian migration to New Zealand occurred during the Kosovo crisis (1999). Albanian refugees fled the conflict and some choose New Zealand as a destination where they had family and viewed the state favourably for its democracy, modernity and opportunities. The New Zealand government permanently accepted 400 Albanians into the country through its special emergency programme for refugees. They came in May 1999 by plane and on arrival were greeted by members of the local Albanian community, the New Zealand media and politicians. The Albanian Civic League led efforts to assist the refugees and it received much coverage in local media. Widespread media focus resulted in donations and assistance being provided for the first groups of refugees from New Zealand community organisations, businesses and private citizens.

All refugees had family members established in the country, many came from a highly educated background and shared a European origin with much of New Zealand's people. Unlike other refugees taken on quotas, they were required to be sponsored by New Zealand family members who were mostly based in Auckland and composed the small Kosovar community. The refugees faced integration issues related to accessing all citizen based opportunities in relation to government health and social services. There was some intolerance toward them from part of the New Zealand population regarding employment over differences such as their accents or being foreigners. New Zealand's changing economy impacted the refugees ability to adjust to economic and cultural circumstances. Family members assisted the refugees in settling down and becoming familiar with the local culture and norms. The adult refugees were given English language courses and job retraining, while the youth were prepared for and began their schooling. In 2000, four more families arrived from Kosovo, although they had no relatives in New Zealand.

Eventually, factors that allowed Kosovars in New Zealand to do well were having a pre-existing community and coming from a European culture. In the early twenty first century, Albanians in Auckland own various businesses, some in the food industry, others work in labour trades and the youth have focused on professions gained from a university education. In the 2010s, Albanian Muslims constitute a small group of European Muslims among the larger multicultural New Zealand Muslim community. New Zealand Albanians are bilingual.

== Demographics ==
Among the Albanian community, they estimate their population to number between 400 and 500. In the 2018 census, 249 declared themselves as Albanian with 72.3 percent solely identified as Albanian, and the rest with additional ethnic backgrounds. There has been a shift in religious identification. In 2006, the majority of census respondents identified as Muslim (62.7 percent), with small numbers as Christian (12 percent) and with no religion (15.7 percent). The 2018 population census recorded 55.4 percent of Albanians in New Zealand were non-religious, identification as Muslims declined to 22.9 percent and Christians at 15.2 percent.

== Notable Albanian New Zealanders ==
- Nazmi Mehmeti – anti communist and community activist
- Mazhar Krasniqi – businessman and community leader

== See also ==
- Albanian Australians
- Albanian diaspora
- Albanians
- European New Zealanders
- Europeans in Oceania
- Immigration to New Zealand
- Kosovo Albanians
