= Ponsonby Mosque =

First mosque of New Zealand

Coordinates: 36°51′09″S 174°44′38″E

Ponsonby Mosque (Al-Masjid Al-Jamie)
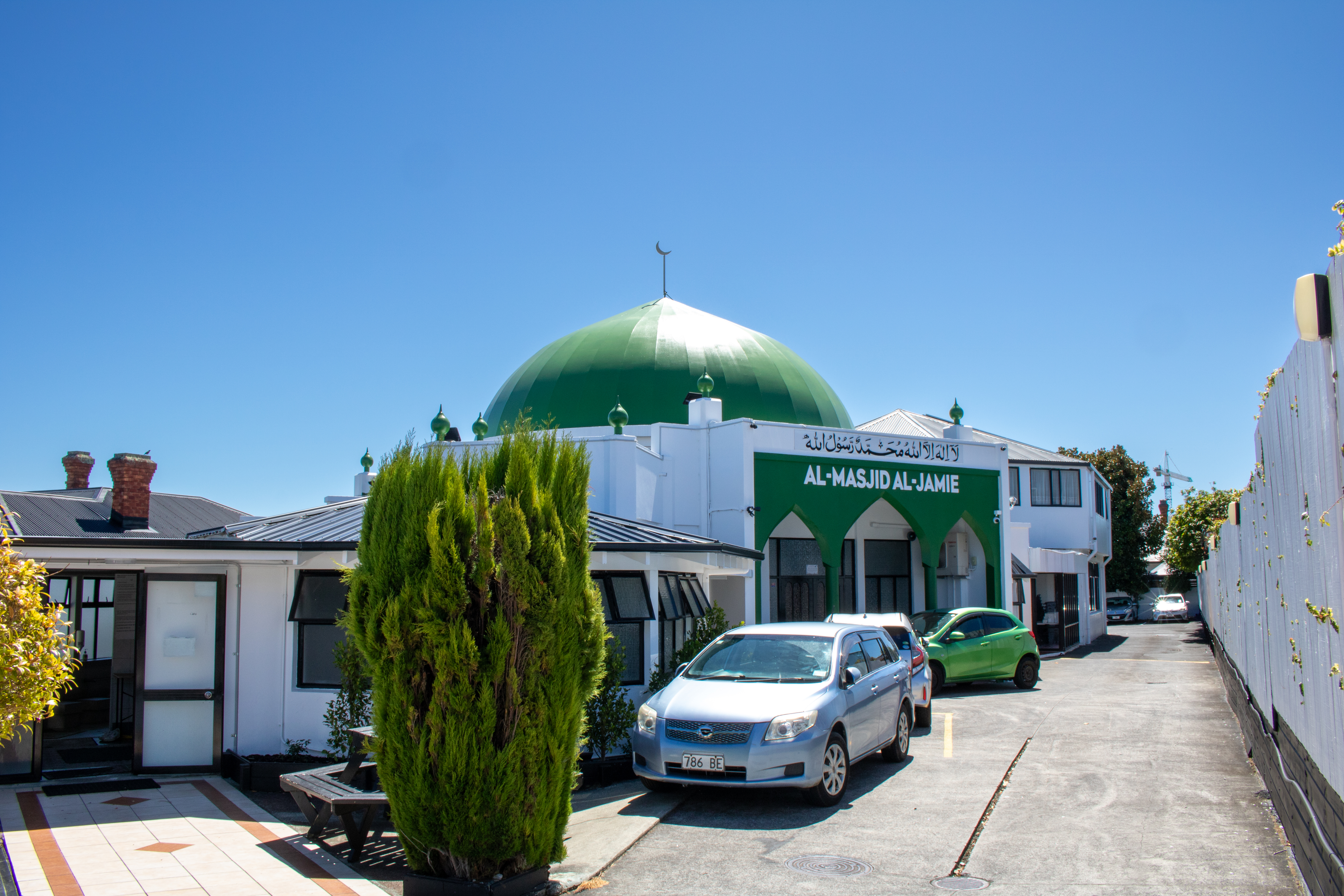

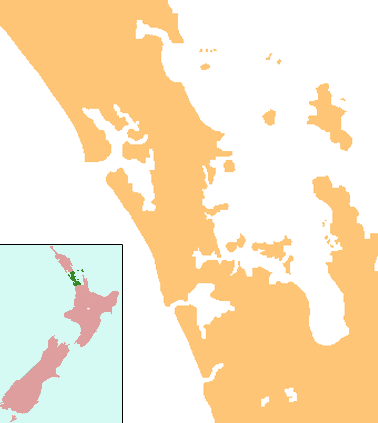
- Location in Auckland, New Zealand

Religion
- Affiliation: Islam
- Branch/tradition: Sunni Islam

Location
- Location: 17 Vermont Street, Ponsonby, Auckland, New Zealand
- Administration: New Zealand Muslim Association(NZMA)

Architecture
- Type: Mosque
- Established: 1979
- Capacity: 700

Ponsonby Mosque (also known as Al-Masjid Al-Jamie) is the first purpose-built mosque in New Zealand, located in the Ponsonby suburb of Auckland. The foundation stone was laid in 1979 by the New Zealand Muslim Association (NZMA), making it a landmark for the country's Muslim community.

== Overview and history ==
Muslim worship in Auckland initially took place in houses and rented halls from the 1950s onward. The NZMA decided to construct a purpose-built mosque to meet the needs of a growing community. On 30 March 1979, the foundation stone was laid after Friday prayers in an event described as historic and emotional.

In 1986, an expansion added a women’s prayer room, kitchen, Imam’s residence, Janaza (funeral) facility, and an extra hall for large Friday congregations. The mosque became a hub for religious and social activities, including Tablighi Jamaat gatherings and community classes.

The mosque reflects Indian subcontinental architectural styles, with a large green dome and pointed arches. Its suburban location near Auckland’s city centre makes it both accessible and distinctive.

The mosque has a capacity of around 700 worshippers and provides religious, educational, and social services such as daily prayers, Islamic education, Da’wah programmes, and funeral services. Parking is limited on site but arrangements are made with nearby churches during Friday prayers.

Following the Christchurch mosque shootings in 2019, Ponsonby Mosque was among those in Auckland that opened its doors to the wider public as part of national interfaith solidarity. Thousands of people, including civic leaders, visited for open days and remembrance services.

The mosque’s growth and interfaith engagement were shaped by community leaders such as Abdul Rahim Rasheed, president and patron of NZMA, who was instrumental in fundraising and dialogue with wider New Zealand society.

== See also ==
- Islam in New Zealand
- New Zealand Muslim Association
- List of mosques in Oceania
