= Kolig =

Kolig is a surname. Notable people with the surname include:

- Anton Kolig (1886–1950), Austrian painter
- Erich Kolig, Austrian–New Zealand cultural and social anthropologist
