= Judy Wilson =

Judy Wilson may refer to:

- Judy Blye Wilson, American casting director
- Judy Wilson (actress) (1938–2006), English actress
- Judy McIntosh Wilson (born 1937), New Zealand sculptor and fibre artist
