= Peter Coutts =

Peter Coutts may refer to:

- Peter Coutts (archaeologist) (fl. 1964–1984), Australian archaeologist
- Peter Coutts (cricketer) (1937–2015), New Zealand cricketer
