= Ashraf Choudhary =

New Zealand politician

Ashraf Choudhary QSO
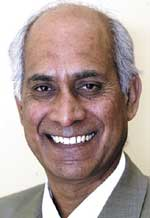

Member of the New Zealand Parliament for Labour party list
- In office 27 July 2002 – 26 November 2011

Personal details
- Born: 15 February 1949 (age 77) Sialkot, Punjab, Pakistan
- Party: Labour
- Education: University of Agriculture, Faisalabad (UAF) Pakistan; Massey University, New Zealand
- Committees: Primary Production Committee
- Fields: Agricultural Engineering
- Institutions: Massey University

Ashraf Choudhary QSO (born 15 February 1949; Sialkot, Punjab) is a Pakistani-New Zealand scientist in agricultural engineering and formerly a member of the Parliament in New Zealand. He is a member of the Labour Party, and was New Zealand's first MP from South Asia and Pakistan.

== Early life ==
Choudhary was born in the Pakistani half of the Punjab region in village Jajay at the home of Chaudhry Muhammad Boota. He comes from a family of agriculture. He attended high school in the town of Sialkot, and then gained a degree in agricultural engineering from University of Agriculture, Faisalabad (UAF) in Faisalabad. He continued his studies abroad, gaining a master's degree in agricultural engineering at the University of Newcastle upon Tyne, England and a PhD in agricultural engineering at Massey University, New Zealand.

== Scientific and community work ==
Choudhary was originally an environmental scientist and taught at Massey University. He has published a large number of scientific papers in his field, and is considered to be an international authority on conservation tillage. His work has a particular focus on agricultural techniques in developing countries. Choudhary has three children.

Before entering Parliament, Choudhary had worked with a number of community organisations, including such groups as the New Zealand Federation of Ethnic Councils and FIANZ – the Federation of Islamic Associations of New Zealand (of which he was president in 1984–85). In his capacity as president of FIANZ he oversaw the first annual halal meat contract with the New Zealand Meat Producers Board in June 1984, with the aid of Mazhar Krasniqi, Hajji Abdul Rahim Rasheed and Dr. Mohammad Hanif Quazi.

== Parliamentary politics ==
New Zealand Parliament
Years	Term	Electorate	List	Party
2002–2005	47th	List	40	Labour
2005–2008	48th	List	25	Labour
2008–2011	49th	List	31	Labour

Having been a supporter of the Labour Party for some time, Choudhary was elected to Parliament as a Labour Party list MP in the 2002 election. He was sworn in on the Qur'an, which Winston Peters (leader of the New Zealand First party) criticised as breaking "centuries-old tradition." Choudhary, however, responded that the tradition was broken when Premier Julius Vogel was sworn in on the Torah. Because Parliamentary officials did not have a copy of the Qur'an, they obtained a copy from the FIANZ office, which was then donated to the Parliamentary Library for use in the future.

During his time in Parliament, Choudhary served on the Primary Production, Local Government and Environment, and Education and Science select committees. He also came to public attention in 2003, when he abstained in a vote to legalise prostitution. The Muslim community were upset by his decision to abstain from voting since prostitution is seen as a violation of their faith.

In 2011, Choudhary was mentioned in Anders Behring Breivik's manifesto 2083: A European Declaration of Independence where Choudhary was used an example of Muslim's failing to assimilate by not condoning the stoning of homosexuals and those who have extramarital affairs. Choudhary had in 2004 stated that stoning was in line with Qur'an teachings, but had no place in New Zealand. He responded to the inclusion in the manifesto by saying "He is a terrorist and we should condemn what he has done and that is all I really want to say."

== Post-parliament career ==
On 29 September 2011, Choudhary delivered his valedictory speech in Parliament and would retire from politics after the 2011 general election. Since retiring Choudhary has been active in the Pakistani and Indian community circles of Auckland encouraging youth political involvement and supporting blood donor drives.

At the 2016 election and 2019 election local body elections Choudhary was elected to the Otara-Papatoetoe Local Board and Counties Manukau District Health Board.

== Honours ==
In the 2001 New Year Honours, Choudhary was appointed a Companion of the Queen's Service Order for community service.

== See also ==
- Islam in New Zealand
