= Rečane, Gostivar =

Rečane Речане Reçan
- Village
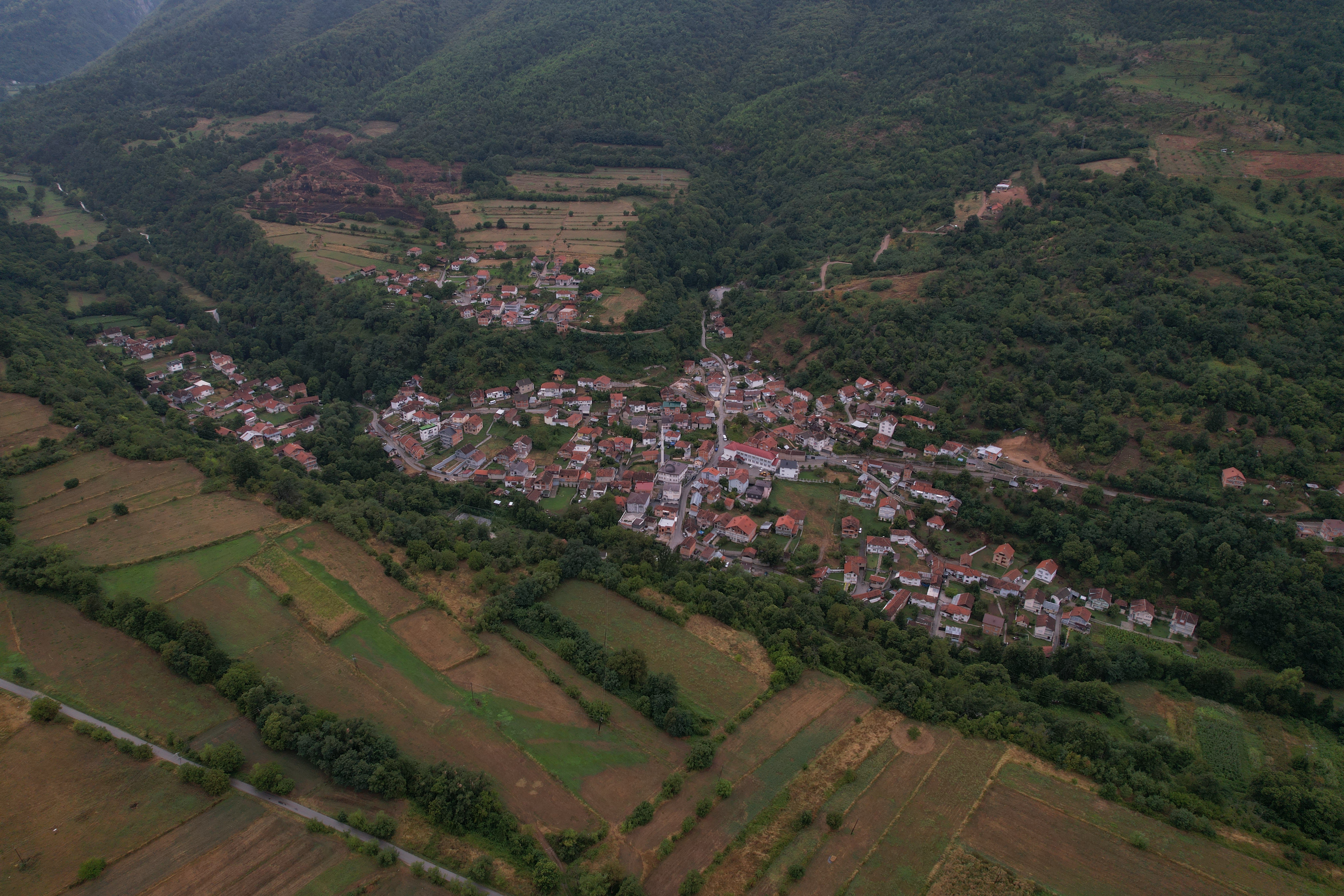
- Airview of the village

- Location within North Macedonia
- Coordinates: 41°45′N 20°50′E
- Country: North Macedonia
- Region: Polog
- Municipality: Gostivar

Population (2021)
  - Total: 683
- Time zone: UTC+1 (CET)
  - Summer (DST): UTC+2 (CEST)
- Car plates: GV
- Website: .

Rečane (Macedonian: Речане, Albanian: Reçan) is a village in the municipality of Gostivar, North Macedonia.

== History ==
Rečane is attested in the 1467/68 Ottoman tax registry (defter) for the Nahiyah of Kalkandelen. The village had a total of 80 Christian households, 3 widows and 2 bachelors.

During World War II, in 1941, the village was incorporated into the Italian-controlled Albanian Kingdom. After Italy's withdrawal in September 1943, the village came under the control of Nazi Germany, which was sided with the Albanian nationalist and anti-communist Balli Kombëtar, to resist Albanian and Yugoslav communist forces. Macedonian partisans took over the village in 1944 and forced village men to fight for them.

== Demographics ==
As of the 2021 census, Rečane had 683 residents with the following ethnic composition:

- Albanians 664
- Persons for whom data are taken from administrative sources 18
- Macedonians 1

According to the 2002 census, the village had a total of 1054 inhabitants. Ethnic groups in the village include:

- Albanians 1038
- Others 16

According to the 1942 Albanian census, Rečane was inhabited by 1353 Muslim Albanians.

The village is attested in the 1467/68 Ottoman tax registry (defter) for the Nahiyah of Kırçova. The village had a total of 81 houses, excluding bachelors (mucerred).

== Sports ==
Local football club KF Përparimi have played in the Macedonian Third League.

== Notable people ==
- Nazmi Mehmeti (1918-1995) - Albanian community leader in New Zealand
