= List of mosques in New Zealand =

The following is a non-exhaustive list of mosques in New Zealand. As of 2019 there were about 60 mosques and Islamic centres in the country.

Region	City	Suburb	Name	Images	Year	Group	Remarks
Auckland	Auckland	Avondale	Avondale Islamic Centre		1998		Briefly closed in 2014 until 2015
Auckland	Auckland	Manurewa	Baitul Muqeet Mosque		2013	Ahmadiyya	At the time of opening, the ahmadiya mosque was the largest in the country.
Auckland	Auckland	Glen Eden	Masjid-e-Bilal				
Auckland	Auckland	Ponsonby	Ponsonby Mosque		1979		New Zealand's first mosque
Auckland	Auckland	Rānui	West Auckland Mosque and Islamic Centre		1995		
Bay of Plenty	Tauranga	Tauranga South	Tauranga Mosque				
Canterbury	Christchurch	Riccarton	Al Noor Mosque		1985	Sunni	First mosque in the South Island
Canterbury	Christchurch	Linwood	Linwood Islamic Centre		2018	Sunni	
Canterbury	Timaru	Parkside	Bilal Mosque and Timaru Islamic Centre		2021		
Hawke's Bay	Hastings	Parkvale	Baitul Mokarram Masjid and Islamic Centre		2010		
Manawatū-Whanganui	Palmerston North	West End	Palmerston North Islamic Centre		1995		Originally established in 1985 at a different location
Manawatū-Whanganui	Taihape		Ad-Deen Mosque Taihape Islamic Centre		2014		Claimed to be the highest mosque in New Zealand
Manawatū-Whanganui	Whanganui	Whanganui East	Masjid-E-Bilal		2003		
Marlborough	Blenheim	Blenheim Central	Blenheim Masjid and Community Centre		2022		
Northland	Whangārei	Morningside	Northland Islamic Centre				
Otago	Dunedin	Dunedin North	Al-Huda Mosque		2000		
Otago	Dunedin	South Dunedin	Al-Maryam Islamic Centre		2020		
Otago	Queenstown	Queenstown Central	Queenstown Masjid		2020		
Southland	Invercargill	Hawthorndale	Southland Muslim Association Masjid		2010		Claimed to be the southernmost mosque in the world
Southland	Mataura		Mataura Masjid and community centre				Services Muslim workers at the Mataura meat works.
Taranaki	Hāwera		Hāwera Islamic Centre				
Taranaki	New Plymouth	Hillsborough	Taranaki Islamic Centre		2016		
Waikato	Taupō	Taupō Central	Taupo Islamic Centre		2015		
Wellington	Lower Hutt	Taitā	Lower Hutt Islamic Centre		1997		
Wellington	Wellington	Kilbirnie	Wellington Islamic Centre		Before 1999		

== See also ==
- List of mosques in Oceania
