= Nazmi Mehmeti =

New Zealand Muslim leader (1918–1995)

Nazmi Mehmeti (1918-1995), also recorded as “Mehmetovitch” on the SS Goya.

== Biography ==
Mehmeti was an Albanian born on 25 March 1918 in Rečane, Macedonia, near Gostivar. Between 1931 and 1935, he attended a school in Bodesti, Romania, where his father operated a shop. Leaving school, he returned to Yugoslavia and worked on the family farm. He went to New Zealand in 1951, at the age of 33. Mehmeti was a very well-known wrestler in Macedonia in his youth: he was tough, strong, and fought in the rugged mountains of the Balkans until the end of 1948, when he crossed the border into Greece. He had eight wounds in his body from fighting the communist secret service in Macedonia and Albania. His ‘application for registration as an alien’ in New Zealand, dated 25 May 1951 and witnessed by Constable K. H. English at Pahiatua, described Nazmi Mehmeti as 5”11, of good build, with brown hair and green eyes. His official ‘reason for leaving native country’ is listed as ‘fighting with partisan forces’. Apart from being a staunch patriot and firmly committed anti-communist, he was also a devoted Muslim, praying five times a day. He urged others to fast during Ramadan and to love their fellow man, “whoever says Amen”, irrespective of faith. In August 1957, Nazmi and his wife Sonya were interviewed by a civil servant processing their naturalisation application; he noted that Mrs Mehmet ‘has adopted the Moslem religion since her marriage to Mehmet’ and with regard to the oath of allegiance to New Zealand, ‘both wish to take the oath on the Koran.’

By trade, Mehmeti was a carpenter and worked around Lower Hutt, Upper Hutt, and Wellington. To start with, he built a house in Upper Hutt and he later moved on to Auckland. He also worked at the Meremere power station as a carpenter for a period. He made a marked contribution to the leadership of the New Zealand Muslim Association during the 1960s and is particularly remembered for his constant efforts to maintain the NZMA Islamic Centre property on Hargreaves Street.

Nazmi Mehmeti is largely responsible for securing the first Muslim cemetery in New Zealand (1963). Beforehand, Muslims were buried in various plots and even in the Chinese allotments. A few days before the festival of Eid al Adha in 1963, a Muslim burial plot was officially established in the Waikumete Cemetery in western Auckland. The Auckland City Council Parks and Library Committee confirmed a New Zealand Muslim Association petition for 100 places on 29 April 1963, following two meetings in March between the Director of Parks and several members of the executive committee, led by Nazmi Mehmeti, as president of the Association.
