= Dent Harper =

New Zealand cricketer (1937–1997)

Dent Harper (born Gordon Dentford Harper; 1 April 1937 – 26 June 1997) was a New Zealand cricketer. He was a right-handed batsman and right-arm medium-fast bowler who played for Northern Districts. He was born in Te Waitere and died in Auckland.

Harper made a single first-class appearance for the team, during the 1958–59 season, against Canterbury. In the only innings in which he batted, he scored 0 not out. He took figures of 0-23 from 14 overs of bowling.
