= Trevor Blake =

New Zealand cricketer

Trevor Blake (13 March 1937 – 23 August 2004) was a New Zealand cricketer and field hockey player from Whangārei. He represented his country at the 1964 Summer Olympics and competed in the field hockey competition, where New Zealand came 13th.

Blake was born in Whangārei in 1937.

Blake was a right-handed batsman who played for Northern Districts. Blake made a single first-class appearance for the team, during the 1964–65 season, against Canterbury. From the middle order, he scored a duck in the first innings in which he batted, and a single run in the second.

Blake died in Whangārei on 23 August 2004.
