= Naila Hassan =

New Zealand police officer

- Naila Hassan
- Born: Naila; New Zealand
- Citizenship: New Zealand
- Occupation: Superintendent of Police
- Employer(s): North Shore, Rodney & West Auckland Police
- Organization: New Zealand Police
- Known for: First highest ranking Muslim police officer

Naila Hassan is one of New Zealand's top-ranked police officers. She is now a Superintendent of New Zealand Police. She was promoted to the rank of inspector – one of the first Muslim women in New Zealand. However, it took her more than 20 years to tell anyone that she is a Muslim.

== Early life ==
Hassan has worked across numerous roles in her policing career, including Criminal Investigation Branch (CIB), prosecutions and as an area commander in the Waikato. She has been Area Commander since May 2015.
