= Dave Gallop =

New Zealand cricketer (born 1937)

Dave Gallop QSM
Personal information
- Full name: David Langton Gallop
- Born: 10 September 1937 (age 89); Christchurch, New Zealand
- Batting: Right-handed
- Bowling: Right-arm leg-spin

Domestic team information
- Years: Team
- 1956–57 to 1965–66: Canterbury

Career statistics
Competition	First-class
Matches	24
Runs scored	803
Batting average	20.58
100s/50s	1/5
Top score	124
Balls bowled	2156
Wickets	27
Bowling average	35.66
5 wickets in innings	0
10 wickets in match	0
Best bowling	3/27
Catches/stumpings	16/0
- Source: Cricinfo, 12 November 2018

David Langton Gallop QSM (born 10 September 1937) is a former cricketer who played first-class cricket for Canterbury from 1956 to 1966 and was later a cricket administrator.

== Playing career ==
Gallop attended Christchurch Boys' High School. He was a middle-order batsman and leg-spin bowler. His best season with the ball was 1956–57, when he took 11 first-class wickets at an average of 32.09, although he took his best figures of 3 for 27 in 1962–63 against Northern Districts.

His best season with the bat was 1961–62, when he made 324 runs in the Plunket Shield and finished sixth in the competition aggregates. He began the season by top-scoring in each innings with 89 and 53 against Auckland. His only century came in 1965–66, also against Auckland, when he went to the wicket in the first innings with the score at 23 for 5 and made 124; Canterbury eventually won the close match by two wickets.

Gallop was one of a number of leg-spinners given a trial in advance of New Zealand's tour of India, Pakistan and England in 1965 but he was not selected for the tour, and played no more major cricket after the 1965–66 season.

== Administrative career ==
Gallop has been a stalwart as a player and administrator for the Sydenham club in senior Christchurch cricket for most of his life. He played 235 matches for Sydenham, making 7000 runs and taking 532 wickets. He has held most administrative positions with the club, as well as standing as its guarantor at one stage during a period of financial uncertainty. He also served as treasurer of the Canterbury Cricket Association from 1977 until his retirement in 1988, when he was awarded life membership.

In June 2001 he was awarded the Queen's Service Medal for community service. In 2016 he was inducted into Canterbury Cricket's "Red and Black Club" in recognition of his outstanding service to cricket in Canterbury.
