= Barry Thomas (rugby union) =

New Zealand rugby union player (1937–2018)

- Born: Barry Trevor Thomas; 21 July 1937 Auckland, New Zealand
- Died: 5 January 2018 (aged 80) Auckland, New Zealand
- Height: 1.85 m (6 ft 1 in)
- Weight: 100 kg (220 lb)
- School: Otahuhu College

Rugby union career
- Position: Prop
Provincial / State sides
Years	Team	Apps	(Points)
1958–63, 65–67	Auckland	86	
1964	Wellington	9	
International career
Years	Team	Apps	(Points)
1962–64	New Zealand	4	(0)

Barry Trevor Thomas (21 July 1937 – 5 January 2018) was a New Zealand rugby union player. A prop, Thomas represented Auckland and, briefly, Wellington at a provincial level. He was a member of the New Zealand national side, the All Blacks, in 1962 and 1964. All four of his appearances for the All Blacks were in internationals against Australia played in New Zealand.

Thomas died in the Auckland suburb of Epsom on 5 January 2018.
