= Jindra Tichá =

Czech-New Zealand writer and academic

Jindra Tichá (born Jindřiška Svobodová 31 March 1937) is a Czech-born academic and writer living in New Zealand. In 2012, she was voted the 11th most influential Czech expatriate by the Czech public.

She was born in Prague and studied logic at Charles University in Prague, earning her PhD there. She married Pavel Tichý. After she and her husband were declared enemies of the state by the invading Russians in 1969, the couple moved to Exeter in England and then, in 1970, went to New Zealand. She lectured on philosophy and political science at the University of Otago where her husband also lectured.

Tichá first published short stories in the 1980s through the Canadian-based Czech publishing house 68 Publishers. It was not until after 1989 that her books began to appear in the Czech Republic.

== Selected works ==
- Cena porážky (2001)
- Pacific Letters, essays (2001)
- Dospělí milenci nemlčí (2004)
- Jak se investuje do nemovitostí na Novém Zélandu (2005)
- Přirozená linie ženského těla (2006)
- Incest (2007)
