= Lance Pearson =

New Zealand cricketer and basketball player (1937–2019)

Personal information
- Full name: Launcelot Robert Pearson
- Born: 1 January 1937; Dunedin, Otago, New Zealand
- Died: 20 July 2019 (aged 82); Dunedin, Otago, New Zealand
- Batting: Right-handed
- Bowling: Right-arm off break
- Role: Batsman

Domestic team information
- Years: Team
- 1961/62–1970/71: Otago

Career statistics
Competition	First-class
Matches	31
Runs scored	1,348
Batting average	23.64
100s/50s	1/6
Top score	140
Balls bowled	116
Wickets	1
Bowling average	70.00
5 wickets in innings	0
10 wickets in match	0
Best bowling	1/6
Catches/stumpings	26/–
- Source: ESPNcricinfo, 15 October 2019

Launcelot Robert Pearson (1 January 1937 – 20 July 2019) was a New Zealand cricketer and basketballer.

Pearson was born at Dunedin in 1937 and educated at King's High School in the city. He played 31 first-class matches for Otago between the 1961–62 and 1970–71 seasons. An opening batsman, his highest score, and only first-class century, was 140 in Otago's victory over Auckland in 1969–70. In Otago's poor season in the Plunket Shield in 1962–63, he was the only batsman in the team to average over 20, with 283 runs at 28.30, "the result of several fine aggressive innings". In the first match of the senior club season in Dunedin in 1966–67, he scored 203 for Kaikorai in just over three hours, with 20 fours and 13 sixes.

Pearson was prominent in basketball in Otago for most of his life, as a player, coach and administrator. He captained Otago to national titles in 1968 and 1970. He was made a life member of Basketball Otago in 2019. Pearson died later in the year at Dunedin. He was aged 82.
