= Toi Te Rito Maihi =

New Zealand artist (1937–2022)

Toi Te Rito Maihi (1937 - 10 December 2022) was a New Zealand weaver, printmaker, painter, educator and writer. She belonged to Ngāti Ipu, Ngāi Te Apata o Ngāti Kahungunu, Ngāti Hao o Taitokerau and the Bland Family of Yorkshire.

Maihi recounted the story of how she learned to weave. She was the only Māori foundation member of the committee of the Ngaruawahia Weaving Hui who was not known as a weaver, and so was generally assigned administrative tasks. Eva Anderson noticed Maihi's frustration and when a weaver had to leave the hui and abandon her partially-completed whakairo kete, it was Anderson who invited Maihi to finish it. Late at night when she was still weaving, Eddie Maxwell showed her how to finish it and sat with her until her first whakairo kete was completed.

Maihi has exhibited widely since the 1970s and her work is held in the collections of the Museum of New Zealand Te Papa Tongarewa and Auckland Art Gallery. Considered an expert in her field, she was the master weaver for Kohewhata Marae in Kaikohe and a major contributor for the publication Whatu Kakahu: Māori Cloaks a publication that accompanied Kahu Ora an exhibition held at The Museum of New Zealand Te Papa Tongarewa in 2013. She had earlier curated an exhibition, Fibre interface, traditional and contemporary Māori and contemporary Pakeha fibre art held at Te Taumata Gallery in Auckland in 1993. The exhibition showcased work by Tawai Tauroa, Eva Anderson, Clare Coyle, Christina Hurihia Wirihana, Rangi Kiu, Eddie Maxwell, and Mary Donald, among others.

== Selected publications ==
- Maihi, Toi Te Rito. (2003) Whakaaro aroha. New Zealand.
- Maihi, Toi Te Rito. (1992) Pakeke! Pakeke! Whalesong Tamakimakaurau.
- Maihi, Toi te Rito & Lander, Maureen. (2005) He Kete He Kōrero. Reed, Auckland New Zealand.
