= Judith McKinlay =

New Zealand biblical scholar (1937–2019)

- Born: Judith Elizabeth McKenzie; 2 July 1937; Drury, New Zealand
- Died: 9 February 2019 (aged 81); Dunedin, New Zealand
- Spouse: Henry McKinlay (m. 1963)

Academic background
- Education: Victoria University of Wellington; University of Otago

Academic work
- Discipline: Biblical studies
- Sub-discipline: Old Testament studies
- Institutions: Knox College, Otago; University of Otago
- Main interests: Feminist theology; Old Testament; Postcolonial theology
- Notable works: Gendering Wisdom the Host (1996); Reframing Her (2004)

Judith Elizabeth McKinlay (née McKenzie; 2 July 1937 – 9 February 2019) was a New Zealand biblical scholar who taught at Knox College, Otago as professor of Old Testament, and as senior lecturer in Old Testament at the University of Otago. McKinlay's special interests were in feminist biblical studies, with a particular focus on female figures in the Old Testament, and postcolonial biblical studies.

== Biography ==
McKinlay was born on 2 July 1937 in Drury, New Zealand. She was the daughter of the Rev Graeme and Esther McKenzie. From 1990 to 1996, she was professor of Old Testament at Knox College, Otago and from 1997 to 2003, lecturer and then senior lecturer in Old Testament at the University of Otago, and a part-time lecturer there for some years thereafter. Professor Johanna Stiebert describes McKinlay as "internationally known and admired" for her work in feminist and postcolonial biblical scholarship.

== Works ==
=== Books ===
- Gendering Wisdom the Host: Biblical Invitations to Eat and Drink (1996)
- Reframing Her: Biblical Women in Postcolonial Focus (2004)
- Troubling Women and Land: Reading Biblical Texts in Aotearoa New Zealand (2014)
