= Neale Thompson =

New Zealand sportsperson (1937–2024)

Personal information
- Full name: Neale Robert Thompson
- Born: 2 February 1937; Invercargill, New Zealand
- Died: 30 August 2024 (aged 87); Invercargill, New Zealand
- Batting: Left-handed

Domestic team information
- Years: Team
- 1952/53–1978/79: Southland
- 1956/57–1962/63: Otago

Career statistics
| Competition | First-class |
|---|---|
| Matches | 18 |
| Runs scored | 420 |
| Batting average | 15.00 |
| 100s/50s | 1/0 |
| Top score | 100* |
| Catches/stumpings | 5/– |
- Source: Cricinfo, 1 January 2022

Neale Robert Thompson (2 February 1937 – 30 August 2024) was a New Zealand cricketer and badminton player. He played 18 first-class matches for Otago between the 1956–57 and 1962–63 seasons, and represented New Zealand at badminton.

== Life and career ==
Thompson was born at Invercargill and educated there at Southland Boys' High School. A left-handed batsman, he played in the New Zealand Colts team in the mid-1950s. At the time, even before he had played first-class cricket, he was considered a future Test player. However, his eventual first-class career was moderate. He had his best season in 1958–59, when he scored 254 runs at an average of 42.33, and converted the only first-class fifty of his career into a century: 100 not out in Otago's victory over Northern Districts. He played Hawke Cup cricket for Southland from 1954 to 1979; he opened the batting during Southland's long tenure as title-holders between March 1973 and February 1977.

Thompson also represented New Zealand at badminton. He won four New Zealand doubles titles and represented the country in five international series from 1958 to 1960.

Thompson met his wife, Fay, when they both represented Southland in badminton. They were married for 63 years until Neale's death in August 2024.
