= John Veitch (cricketer) =

New Zealand cricketer (1937–2009)

Personal information
- Full name: John Robert Veitch
- Born: 26 August 1937; Dunedin, Otago, New Zealand
- Died: 20 December 2009 (aged 72); Rotorua, Bay of Plenty, New Zealand
- Batting: Left-handed
- Bowling: Right-arm medium
- Role: Batsman

Domestic team information
- Years: Team
- 1957/58–1963/64: Otago
- 1964/65: Canterbury

Career statistics
Competition	First-class
Matches	20
Runs scored	517
Batting average	13.97
100s/50s	0/0
Top score	44
Balls bowled	54
Wickets	0
Bowling average	–
5 wickets in innings	–
10 wickets in match	–
Best bowling	–
Catches/stumpings	10/–
- Source: CricInfo, 20 July 2019

John Robert Veitch (26 August 1937 – 20 December 2009) was a New Zealand cricketer who played first-class cricket for Otago and Canterbury between the 1957–58 and 1964–65 seasons.

Veitch was born at Dunedin in 1937 and educated at Otago Boys' High School in the city. He played cricket for the school XI, captaining the side in 1954–55, and played club cricket for Kaikorai Cricket Club in Dunedin. From the 1953–54 season Veitch was selected in age-group sides for Otago, including playing in the Brabin Shield competition.

He scored 55 runs for the Otago under-20 side against Wellington in 1953–54, "shaping well" in his innings, before scoring a "well compiled" 65 against Auckland later in the season and at the beginning of the 1954–55 Plunket Shield season Veitch's name was proposed as a possibility for the senior Otago representative team whilst still at school. He was selected for the New Zealand Colts side at the end of the 1956–57 tournament, and played in the Colts trial matches the following December.

Later in the month Veitch scored 48 runs for an Otago side against a South Island Minor Associations side, and towards the end of December made his full representative debut against Northern Districts in a match played at Carisbrook. Opening the batting, he made scores of 27―an innings called "a classic" by The Press―and 40 runs and was retained in the Otago team throughout their victorious Plunket Shield season. At the end of the season he played for a South Island team against the North Island and for The Rest against the New Zealand national team, both matches trials for the national team squad to tour England during 1958.

Described as a "forceful" left-handed batsman, Veitch made four appearances for Otago during 1958–59 but dropped out of the team for the following season and played only four matches for the province between 1960–61 and 1963–64. In a total of 13 matches for Otago he scored 332 runs with a highest score of 43. Ahead of the 1964–65 season he moved to Christchurch, joining the West Christchurch–University club side. He played in five first-class matches for Canterbury during the season, scoring 132 runs, and although he played for the Canterbury B side, did not play again in senior cricket.

Veitch worked as a storeman. He died at Rotorua in 2009 at the age of 72.
