= Brian Blacktop =

New Zealand lawyer (1937–2007)

Brian James Blacktop (5 April 1937 – 23 June 2007) was a New Zealand lawyer. He spent his entire 48-year career in the New Zealand Public Trust Office. He was Assistant Public Trustee (1973–1981) and Deputy Public Trustee (1981–99).

The Public Trust has established the "Brian Blacktop Award" which offers Public Trust employees an opportunity to get special paid leave and/or financial assistance to do voluntary work in the community "to foster the spirit of those values in Public Trust by remembering Brian and supporting staff to make a meaningful contribution to the wider New Zealand community."

== Early life ==
Blacktop was educated at St Peter's College, Auckland where he was dux and head prefect in 1954. From there he went to medical school at Otago University but soon changed tack, returning to Auckland and in 1959 starting work as a law clerk at the Public Trust Office. He studied law part-time at the University of Auckland. He graduated in law in 1963 and was admitted in the same year to the Bar in the Supreme Court of New Zealand (now known as the High Court of New Zealand).

== Public Trust ==
Blacktop was Public Trust district solicitor in Takapuna from 1965–68, moved to Palmerston North, and then in 1973 to Wellington where he was appointed head office solicitor. In 1981 he was appointed Assistant Public Trustee, and in 1985 Deputy Public Trustee, a position he held until his retirement in March 1999. He continued working at the Public Trust offering legal support to the chief executive during the Public Trust's transformation from a government department to a Crown entity. He assisted with the drafting of the Public Trust Act 2001.

The New Zealand Law Commission cited that their "work on homicidal heirs [sic.] has been especially helped by consultation with ... Brian Blacktop ...."

== Personal ==
Blacktop and his wife, Margaret, had five children, three daughters, Kathie, Mary and Trish as well as two sons, Maurice (deceased) and David. A devout Roman Catholic, he was active in church and community affairs throughout his life.

Among other commitments, he was on the Board of Trustees of Bishop Viard College. He was a member of the Tawa Rotary Club from 1985 and organised and managed the club's Hepatitis B vaccination programme for Tawa's school children in 1989. He won the Paul Harris Fellows award from the Tawa Rotary Club in 2002.

Blacktop served on the administrative board of the Roman Catholic Archdiocese of Wellington from 1981 to 2006. During that time he oversaw a number of important projects including the creation of the new Diocese of Palmerston North and the passing of the Roman Catholic Bishops Empowering Act.

Brian Blacktop died at the age of 70 in 2007. He was recognised by the Catholic Church during his life and both Cardinal Williams and Archbishop, now Cardinal, Dew were present at his funeral, the latter delivering a eulogy.
