= Lawrie Creamer =

New Zealand chemist (1937–2019)

Lawrie Creamer JP FRSNZ
- Born: Lawrence Kenneth Creamer; 23 October 1937; Christchurch, New Zealand
- Died: 7 September 2019 (aged 81); Wellington, New Zealand
- Education: University of Canterbury
- Scientific career
- Fields: Milk protein chemistry
- Workplaces: Fonterra
- Thesis: The Ladenburg rearrangement (1963)
- Doctoral advisors: Jack Vaughan; Alfred Fischer

Lawrence Kenneth Creamer JP FRSNZ (23 October 1937 – 7 September 2019) was a New Zealand chemist specializing in milk protein chemistry. In 2004, he received the International Dairy Federation Award.

== Early life and education ==
Born in Christchurch on 23 October 1937, Creamer was the son of Gladys Henrietta Creamer (née Hopkins) and William Henry Creamer. He was educated at Christchurch Boys' High School, and went on to study chemistry at Canterbury University College, graduating Master of Science with second-class honours in 1961. He completed a PhD at the same institution, by then called the University of Canterbury, in 1963; the title of his doctoral thesis, supervised by Jack Vaughan and Alfred Fischer, was The Ladenburg rearrangement.

== Research career ==
Creamer joined the New Zealand Dairy Research Institute (DRI), later part of Fonterra, in Palmerston North in 1963, and between 1964 and 1966 he undertook protein research at the Massachusetts Institute of Technology. Returning to DRI, he rose to become a principal research scientist in 1990. He led a research team that investigated the chemistry of milk proteins and their interactions. His research covered both fundamental chemistry and practical aspects of the manufacturing of dairy products.

His early work resulted in improvements to the manufacture and consistency of cheese and milk powders. He carried out research into milk protein structures, and the effect of heat on milk and the aggregation of the proteins in whey. As a result, whey proteins, previously only used as animal feed, became ingredients in a range of food products. His research into casein hydrolysis in cheese led to greater understanding of the relationship between cheese composition, texture and flavour.

The current system under which New Zealand dairy farmers are paid for their milk based on its content of milk fat and protein solids was a direct result of work by Creamer.

From the 1990s, much of Creamer's research was on the structure of the whey protein β-lactoglobulin, how it is affected by heat, and its ability to bind vitamins. His research found that the structure of β-lactoglobulin is altered at high temperature, forming a new protein that reacts with smaller milk proteins.

== Honours and awards ==
In 1973, Creamer received the ICI New Zealand Prize, for outstanding achievement in chemical research, and the following year he was elected a Fellow of the New Zealand Institute of Chemistry. In 1984, the American Dairy Science Association awarded him the Miles-Marschall International ADSA Award, for research outside of North America leading to improved dairy products; he was, at the time, the youngest ever recipient of the award. Creamer was elected a Fellow of the Royal Society of New Zealand in 1995, and won the society's Scott Medal in 1999, for pre-eminence in fundamental, strategic and applied New Zealand dairy science and technology. In 2004, Creamer received the world's top dairy honour, the International Dairy Federation Award, in recognition of his contributions to the dairy industry over more than 40 years.

== Selected works ==
- Parris, Nicholas; Anema, Skelte G.; Singh, Harjinder; Creamer, Lawrie K. (1993). "Aggregation of whey proteins in heated sweet whey". Journal of Agricultural and Food Chemistry. 41 (3): 460–464. doi:10.1021/jf00027a021.
- Smith, Mark H.; Edwards, Patrick J.B.; Palmano, Kate P.; Creamer, Lawrence K. (2002). "Structural features of bovine caseinomacropeptide A and B by ^{1}H nuclear magnetic resonance spectroscopy". Journal of Dairy Research. 69 (1): 85–94. doi:10.1017/S0022029901005271. PMID 12047114. S2CID 19322085.
- Cho, Younghee; Singh, Harjinder; Creamer, Lawrence K (2003). "Heat-induced interactions of β-lactoglobulin A and κ-casein B in a model system". Journal of Dairy Research. 70 (1): 61–71. doi:10.1017/S0022029902005642. PMID 12617394. S2CID 86001284.

== Death ==
Creamer died in Wellington on 7 September 2019 at the age of 81.
