= Ron Watson (sailor) =

New Zealand sailor

Personal information
- Nationality: New Zealand
- Born: 18 May 1937 (age 87); Auckland, New Zealand

Sport
- Sport: Sailing

Ron Watson (born 18 May 1937) is a New Zealand sailor. He competed at the 1960 Summer Olympics and the 1972 Summer Olympics.
