= Erich Kolig =

Austrian-New Zealand cultural and social anthropologist

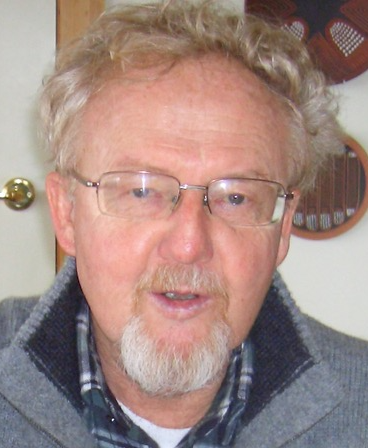
- Born: Austria
- Occupations: Anthropologist, writer, academic

Erich Kolig is an Austrian–New Zealand cultural and social anthropologist whose research has focussed on Muslim and Islamic social and religious issues, and Australian Aboriginal culture. He has written and edited 13 books, as well as publishing many scientific papers and book chapters.

== Biography ==
Kolig read social, cultural and physical anthropology, philosophy, psychology and medicine at the University of Vienna, gaining a PhD in 1969 with a thesis on the body-soul conceptions among New Guinea Papuans, using the methodology of ethnoscience. In 1968 he performed his first field work in Afghanistan as a graduate student, studying matters of Islamic and Muslim society.

In 1970, Kolig shifted his focus to the Kimberley region of Western Australia. with a research fellowship at the University of Western Australia, sponsored by the Australian Institute of Aboriginal Studies in Canberra. This focus was on religious change, and this led to his first book, The Silent Revolution: The Effects of Modernisation on Australian Aboriginal Religion (1981). In 1973, Kolig became a government anthropologist with professional responsibility for the northern half of the state of Western Australia. While the general and professional view at that time was that Aboriginal culture was fast disappearing, in his capacity as a government official Kolig drew attention to the rising Aboriginal cultural renaissance, to predict the future survival of the indigenous religion and the important role it would play in land rights claims.

At the end of 1974, Kolig accepted a lectureship at the University of Otago in Dunedin, New Zealand, where he stayed until early retirement in 2006. During this time he also taught several times as a visiting professor at his alma mater in Vienna, along with several stints as visiting fellow at Australian universities. He acted as consultant to the WA Housing Commission, to mining companies (to map sacred sites and advise on their preservation) and to the West Australian Attorney General's Office and the Premier's Office in matters of native title claims (Aboriginal land rights).

Kolig's subsequent interests included the Pacific region, particularly Vanuatu where he studied charismatic movements). In the 1990s his interests turned to Islamic matters and the study of Muslim society, which linked back to his first field work in Afghanistan in 1969. He became interested in radical Islam in Indonesia and in multicultural situations in which Muslims constitute a minority, and undertook research in New Zealand, Indonesia and Austria to gather material for several books and numerous chapters and articles, and also drew on his travel experience in the Middle East and North Africa. Based on intensive research he produced the first comprehensive study of the New Zealand Muslim community in New Zealand’s Muslims and Multiculturalism in book form. After retirement he continued with Muslim studies as an Honorary Fellow in Religion at Otago University until 2017. Kolig's work after retirement focusses on the connection of culture and globalisation, culture politics in general, and a global comparative exercise of cultural phenomena.

Kolig has also had a vital interest in museum culture. Apart from several periods in the Ethnological Museum of Berlin in Dahlem, he also made collections of Hindukush arts and crafts and Aboriginal art from the Australian Kimberleys (both collections are in the Ethnological Museum in Vienna) and a collection of Vanuatu traditional pottery from the village of Wusi on Espiritu Santo in Vanuatu (in the Otago Museum in Dunedin, New Zealand).

=== Personal life ===
Kolig has Austrian and New Zealand citizenship. He lives on a small farm on the outskirts of Dunedin on the South Island of New Zealand.

== Bibliography ==
=== Single-authored books and monographs ===
- 1981, The Silent Revolution: the Effects of Modernization on Australian Aboriginal Religion. Philadelphia: ISHI (192p.)
- 1987, The Noonkanbah Story: portrait of an Aboriginal community in Western Australia. Dunedin: University of Otago Press (159p.) (1989 3rd enlarged edition (181p.))
- 1989, Dreamtime Politics: Religion, World View and Utopian Thought in Australian Aboriginal Society. Berlin: D.Reimer (161p.)
- 1996, Umstrittene Wuerde: Andreas Reischek, der Neuseeland-Forscher aus dem Oberoesterreichischen Muehlviertel (1845–1902).Wiener Ethnohistorische Blaetter 41, Vienna: Ethnologischer Instituts Verlag der Universitaet Wien (153p.)
- 2010, New Zealand's Muslims and Multiculturalism. Leiden: Brill. (272p.)
- 2012, Conservative Islam: a Cultural Anthropology. Lanham MD: Lexington Books. (381p.)
- 2014, Wiener Märchen: über Museen, Forscher und magische Objekte. Frankfurt a.M.: Frankfurter Taschenbuchverlag.
- 2017, Maban – das Paranormale bei den Aborigines Australiens. Berlin: Frank & Timme.
- 2020, Understanding the Past, Navigating the Future: from the Neanderthal to cultural Globalisation and its Prospects. London: AustinMacauley. (532p.)

=== Edited books/volumes ===
- 2002, E. Kolig and H. Mueckler (eds.), Politics of Indigeneity in the South Pacific. Muenster, Hamburg, London: LIT. (186p.)
- 2006, (edited) Muslims in New Zealand. Special issue of New Zealand Journal of Asian Studies vol. 8/2.
- 2009, E.Kolig, V. Angeles and S. Wong (eds.), Identity in Crossroad Civilisations: Ethnicity, Nationalism and Globalism in Asia. Amsterdam: Amsterdam University Press. (259p.)
- 2014, (edited) Freedom of Speech and Islam. Farnham: Ashgate. (262p.)
- 2016, (ed. with Malcolm Voyce), Muslim Integration: Pluralism and Multiculturalism in New Zealand and Australia. Lanham: Lexington. (280p.)
