= SS Goya =

MS Goya
History
- Name: Kamerun
- Fate: Scrapped 1964

History

Nazi Germany
- Name: Kamerun

History

Norway
- Name: Goya

MS Goya was a Norwegian refugee ship that carried hundreds of Eastern European refugees to New Zealand in 1951. Most notably it carried several men who went on to play a significant role in the development of the New Zealand Muslim Association including Mazhar Krasniqi and Nazmi Mehmeti.

== Launch ==
The vessel as launched by a German company, the Woermann Line, as the Kamerun in May 1938. In May 1945 the Kamerun was ceded to Norway as part of Germany's war reparations. In 1947 it was allocated to A / S J Ludwig Mowinckels Rederi and renamed the Goya. In 1949 Mowinckels secured an IRO contract to transport displaced persons and in 1950 the ship made trips between Italy and Australia. In 1951, it transported emigrants from Germany to Canada.

== New Zealand ==
The ship departed Piraeus, Greece, and arrived in Wellington on 1 May 1951. Initially all the refugees were interned for three months at the former Prisoner of War camp in the small rural settlement of Pahiatua to learn English, New Zealand law and customs.

There were over 900 refugees on board, mostly ethnic Greeks from Romania but also Estonians, Yugoslavs and other eastern Europeans. Approximately 50 were Muslim men including Petrit Alliu, Fadil Katseli, Selahattin Kefali, Ramzi Kosovich, Akif Keskin, Mazhar Krasniqi, Nazmi Mehmeti, Bajram Murati, Omar Alim Pepich, Shaqir Seferi and Samso Yusovich.

Later that same year there were two more drafts of refugees with smaller numbers on board. The majority of the Muslims were Albanians and Bosnians but there was also a Turk, an Azerbaijani, three Bulgarians and two Tartars.

According to Mazhar Krasniqi, many of the Muslims observed Ramadan whilst in Pahiatua when it started in the first week of June. Within a few years they were mostly living in Auckland and in close contact through the New Zealand Muslim Association. "Indian Muslims helped them in the process of settling into their new homeland".

The effect of this was to dramatically increase the number of Muslims in New Zealand and in Auckland in particular. According to the Government census the number of Muslims leapt from a total figure of 67 in 1945 to 205 six years later in 1951.

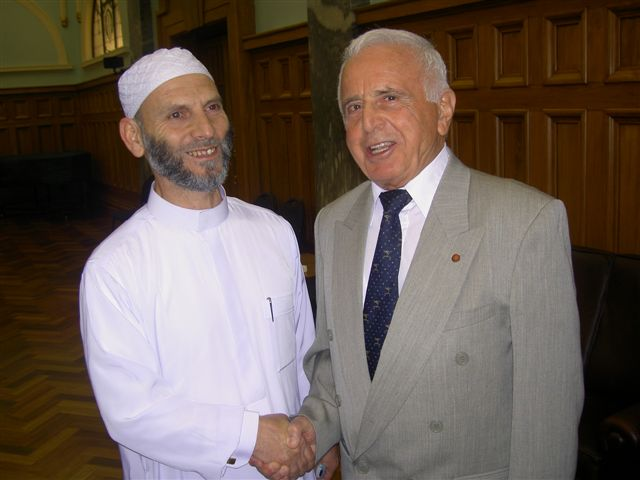
Sheikh Airot, Imam of Ponsonby Mosque (Auckland, New Zealand), and Mazhar Shukri Krasniqi, Q.S.M. Venue: Silver Jubilee celebrations of the Federation of Islamic Associations of New Zealand (FIANZ), 16 November 2005, Parliament House, Wellington, New Zealand.

In 2001 a modest commemorative function attended by Lianne Dalziel was held at the Santorini Greek Restaurant in Christchurch to mark 50 years. In 2008 John Vakidis published his play Tzigane, a fictionalised account of his parents' journey on the ship. The play was first performed at the Downstage Theatre in Wellington and won five awards at the Chapman Tripp Theatre Awards in 1996 (including Best New New Zealand play and Production of the Year).

== Demolition ==
In 1964 the ship was sold to a Greece company and in 1969 it was sent to Taiwan for demolition as scrap metal.

== Sources ==
- Bishop, Martin C. (1997). A History of the Muslim Community in New Zealand to 1980 (Thesis). University of Waikato.
- Drury, Abdullah (2007). Islam in New Zealand: The First Mosque. Christchurch. ISBN 978-0-473-12249-2.
- Brooking, T.; Rabel, R. (1995). Greif, Stuart William (ed.). Immigration and National Identity in New Zealand. p. 40.
- Drury, Abdullah "Once Were Mahometans: Muslims in the South Island of New Zealand, mid-19th to late 20th century, with special reference to Canterbury" (University of Waikato, MPhil, 2016), Hamilton.
- L/22/5 (Labour Department/Series 22/Reference 5) The International Refugee Organization Mass Resettlement to New Zealand Nominal Roll of Persons Departing from Piraeus, Greece on M/V GOYA on 31 March 1951; and IA/52/15 (Internal Affairs/Series 52/Reference 15) Immigrant Name List Goya.

(Regrettably figures are imprecise here as someone has drawn lines through several of the names and it is unclear whether this indicates they boarded, disembarked or otherwise.)

- New Zealand Population Census 1951. Vol. III - Religious Professions. Wellington. 1953. p. 9.
- Peter Plowman, Australian Migration Ships 1946–1977, (Rosenberg Publishing, Dural, N.S.W., 2006), p. 36.
- Matt Stewart, "150 years of news - Pahiatua camp a homage to United Nations' principles", Dominion-Post, 5 October 2015, http://www.stuff.co.nz/dominion-post/news/wairarapa/72592677/150-years-of-news--pahiatua-camp-a-homage-to-united-nations-principles
