= Mazhar Krasniqi =

New Zealand community leader (1931–2019)

Mazhar Krasniqi QSM
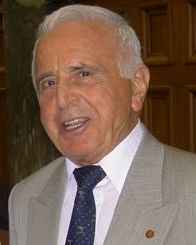

Personal details
- Born: Mazhar Shukri Krasniqi; 17 October 1931 Pristina, Kosovo, Kingdom of Yugoslavia
- Died: 8 August 2019 (aged 87) Australia
- Children: 3
- Occupation: businessman, human rights activist, community leader
- Nicknames: "Baba"; "uncle Mazhar"; "Mazharbeg"

Mazhar Shukri Krasniqi QSM (1931–2019) was a New Zealand Muslim and Albanian community leader of Kosovar Albanian descent, businessman and human rights activist. He was both the first president of the New Zealand Albanian Civic League and Federation of Islamic Associations of New Zealand (FIANZ).

== Biography ==
Mazhar Shukri Krasniqi was born in 1931 in Pristina, Kosovo. He came from a prominent family in Kosovo who held political and economic sway in the region. Krasniqi was against communism and experienced arrests from both Albanian and Yugoslav authorities, in particular due to his escape attempts. In 1950, employed on a Yugoslav vessel, Krasniqi jumped ship in İzmir, Turkey and was registered as a refugee with the UN's International Refugee Organization (IRO). Traveling on the ship SS Goya, an impoverished Krasniqi reached Wellington, New Zealand during May 1951 and later did a variety of jobs such as farm work in Gore. Krasniqi moved to Auckland and between 1959 and 1960 he travelled to Australia, first to Melbourne, followed by Sydney. In Australia, he worked as a foreman expeditor, interacted with Albanian Australian communities and gave speeches to the public about Albanian issues.

Back in Auckland, Krasniqi opened a restaurant and cafe in 1960 named "Free Albania" in the suburb of Panmure, and it became a hub for Albanian cultural activity in the country. As one of a number of Albanians who founded an organisation Lidhjen e Qytetarëve Shqiptarë në Zelandë të Re (the League of Albanian Citizens in New Zealand or 'Albanian Civic League'), he became its long serving leader. The Albanian Civic League assisted the New Zealand Albanian community to keep links with Albanian diaspora groups and prominent figures and to focus public attention on Albanian issues like Kosovo.

Krasniqi raised his children with a Muslim upbringing and he personally was a mosque attendee. His modernist outlook made him want reason and religious revelation to be in harmony and for the norms and mores of human rights and democracy to reshape the Muslim world over time. He opposed Albania's communist government and religious fundamentalism. In 1970, Krasniqi closed "Free Albania" and opened a kiosk at the Panmure "Swimarama", a pool and leisure centre. He made many successful investments and had accumulated wealth that made it possible for Krasniqi to go to Australia, Germany, Jordan, Saudi Arabia, the US and Turkey to publicly advocate for Albanian interests, democracy and human rights. Representing the New Zealand Albanian community, Krasniqi met Mother Teresa in 1970 on her New Zealand trip. In 1974, Krasniqi established an export company that sent farm produce to the Middle East.

Between the 1970s and 1980s, Krasniqi was involved in organising protests against the Soviet Union and he devoted efforts toward unifying Muslim groups in the country. Krasniqi was a founder of New Zealand's first mosque at Ponsonby, in Auckland. Among the New Zealand Muslim community, Krasniqi was held in esteem for his social, oratory and religious skills resulting in his appointment to leadership roles. The Federation of Islamic Associations of New Zealand (FIANZ) was formed in 1979 and Krasniqi became its first leader. As president, Krasniqi established FIANZ's halal department and he played a significant role in promoting halal slaughter within freezing works in New Zealand. FIANZ became a halal certifier backed by important customers based in the Gulf and Krasniqi's efforts assisted New Zealand in becoming an exporter of halal meat to Middle Eastern markets. Krasniqi also became president of the New Zealand Muslim Association in 1975 and 1987.

Interested in the cause of refugees, Krasniqi also became a voice for Albanian migrants from the Balkans. Ibrahim Rugova, the Kosovo Albanian political leader and Krasniqi met three times during the 1990s. He had established close ties with Albanian American Joseph DioGuardi, a US senator who organised a 1994 meeting between Krasniqi and US president Bill Clinton to talk about Kosovo Albanian issues. During the Kosovo crisis (1999), Krasniqi lobbied the New Zealand government to take in Albanian refugees. Krasniqi, as part of the Albanian Civic League greeted the incoming refugees at the airport, led local efforts to assist them and it received much coverage in New Zealand media. In the 2003 New Year Honours, Krasniqi's efforts and deeds to the Albanian and wider Muslim community were recognised in New Zealand and he was awarded the Queen's Service Medal for community service. Krasniqi reflections of New Zealand were as a welcoming place and an example of freedom and democracy. In his late years, Krasniqi lived in Australia and died there on 8 August 2019. An obituary in The New Zealand Herald described Krasniqi as a "strong leader" and "great Albanian New Zealander".

Krasniqi was married. His eldest daughter Besa is a Sufi Muslim scholar based in Jordan and married to Nuh Ha Mim Keller, an American convert and Muslim scholar. He has a son living in northern Australia and another child.

== Bibliography ==
- Abdyli, Sabit R. Bijtë e shqipesnёtokën e revetëbardha (Auckland: Universal Print & Management, 2010), pp. 96–97.
- Berryman, Warren, and Draper, John. "Meat exporters resist costly Islamic crusade". National Business Review (May 1979), Volume 9, No.16 (Issue 333), p. 1.
- Beyer, Kurt, ‘Kaumatua’ of Muslims in NZ dies aged 87’, New Zealand Herald,22 August 2019, p.A19.
- Bishop, Martin C. '"A History of the Muslim Community in New Zealand to 1980", thesis submitted in partial fulfillment of the requirement for the degree of M.A. in history at the University of Waikato' (Waikato University, 1997).
- "Growing Support For Queen St Protest March". Auckland Star(26 August 1968), p. 3.
- "3000 stage city protest". Auckland Star (28 August 1968), p. 1.
- “City Mosque For Muslims”. New Zealand Herald (28 March 1979), p. 1.
- De Graaf, Peter. “The Kiwi Kosovars”. Metro (June 2001), pp. 89–93.
- Drury, Abdullah. “A Short History of the Ponsonby Mosque, New Zealand”. Al-Nahdah (Malaysia), Vol.19, No.3, pp. 36–38.
- Drury, Abdullah. “A Short History: New Zealand’s First Mosque”. Muslim World League Journal (Dhul-Qa‘adah 1421 – February 2001), Vol.28, No.11, pp. 45–48.
- Drury, Abdullah. “A Short History of the Ponsonby Mosque, Auckland”. Da’wah Highlights (Rabi-ul Awwal 1422 – June 2001), Vol.XII, Issue 6, pp. 43–50.
- Drury, Abdullah. “A Tribute to the Illyrian Pioneers”. Al Mujaddid (March 2002 – Muharram 1423), Vol.1, No.16, p. 10.
- Drury, Abdullah, Islam in New Zealand: The First Mosque (Christchurch, 2007) ISBN 978-0-473-12249-2
- Drury, Abdullah. “Mazhar Krasniqi Now QSM”. Al Mujaddid (20 March 2003 – Muharram 1424), p. 16.
- Drury, Abdullah. “Mazharbeg”. Al Mujaddid (21 June 2003 – Rabiul Thani 1424), Vol.1, p. 14.
- Drury, Abdullah, 'Mazharbeg: An Albanian in Exile’, Waikato Islamic Studies Review June 2020, Vol 6, No 1, pp. 4–20.
- Drury, Abdullah "Once Were Mahometans: Muslims in the South Island of New Zealand, mid-19th to late 20th century, with special reference to Canterbury" (University of Waikato, MPhil, 2016), Hamilton.
- Drury, Abdullah "Mahometans on the Edge of Colonial Empire: Antipodean Experiences" in Islam and Christian–Muslim Relations, Volume 29, Issue 1, pp. 71–87.
- "Eastern Dome For Skyline". New Zealand Herald (7 April 1980), p. 2.
- "Islamic Meat Trade". Otago Daily Times (12 March 1979), p. 1.
- Middleton, Julie, "NZ Muslim leader honoured."The New Zealand Herald (22 August 2005), p. 10.
- "Muslims Raising Meat Deal Snags". Evening Post (4 August 1979), p. 8.
- Thomson, Ainsley. "Mazhar Krasniqi". New Zealand Herald (31 December 2002), p.A6.
- Trickett, Peter. "Minarets in Ponsonby". New Zealand Listener (21 April 1979), pp. 18–19.
- Waja, Ismail. "50 Years Celebrations".Al Mujaddid (July 2001), p. 1–2, 7.
- New Zealand Gazette (10 January 2003), Issue No.2., p. 83.
- 'We belong to Allah and to Allah we shall return.' Community Connect, Issue 3 (September 2019), p. 3.

== External sources ==
- Kajtazi, Sani (13 September 2019). "Mazhar Krasniqi: This is my life". SBS. - audio documentary about Mazhar Krasniqi's life
