= Peter Coutts (cricketer) =

New Zealand cricketer

Personal information
- Full name: Peter John Charles Coutts
- Born: 3 November 1937; Napier, New Zealand
- Died: 3 November 2015 (aged 78); Takapuna, Auckland, New Zealand
- Batting: Right-handed
- Bowling: Right-arm off-spin

Domestic team information
- Years: Team
- 1958/59–1968/69: Central Districts
- 1969/70: Wellington
- 1972/73: Central Districts

Career statistics
Competition	First-class	List A
Matches	29	2
Runs scored	1,379	100
Batting average	28.14	100.00
100s/50s	4/2	0/1
Top score	152	82*
Balls bowled	82	–
Wickets	0	–
Bowling average	–	–
5 wickets in innings	–	–
10 wickets in match	–	–
Best bowling	–	–
Catches/stumpings	21/–	0/–
- Source: Cricinfo, 23 May 2020

Peter John Charles Coutts (3 November 1937 – 3 November 2015) was a New Zealand cricketer who played first-class cricket for Central Districts and Wellington from 1958 to 1973.

Coutts was a right-handed opening batsman. After three unsuccessful matches for Central Districts in 1958–59 he did not play first-class cricket for nearly eight years, but when he returned in 1966–67 he scored 152 in his first match, against Canterbury, easily the highest score in an innings victory for Central Districts. It was also the highest score, and one of only five centuries, in that season's Plunket Shield, which Central Districts won. He was also one of Central Districts' leading batsmen in 1967–68, when they again won the Shield.

In 1972–73 Coutts won the man of the match award in the opening match of the New Zealand Motor Corporation Knockout Tournament when he scored 82 not out in Central Districts' seven-wicket victory over Wellington. It was the highest score in that season's competition. He also played Hawke Cup cricket for Hawke's Bay from 1959 to 1973.
