= Judy McIntosh Wilson =

New Zealand sculptor and fibre artist

Judy McIntosh Wilson (born 1937) is a New Zealand sculptor and fibre artist.

== Education ==
Wilson graduated with a Diploma in Fine Arts (Sculpture) from the University of Canterbury in 1959.

== Career ==
Wilson's work belongs to the category of Earth (or Environmental) Art. She has lived most of her life in the small farming community of Waikuku in North Canterbury, near Pegasus Bay. Her physical environment has played a strong role in her art, providing the materials she works with: wool, river stones, bark, beach pebbles, shells and driftwood.

Wilson began working with fibre in the early 1970s, and started breeding sheep (specifically English Leicester) to achieve the quality and kind of wool she wanted to work with. In 1974 she was included in the 12 Weavers exhibition at the Auckland War Memorial Museum.

In the 1990s Wilson moved back to sculptural work, creating installations from natural materials. Early in her life Wilson began 'wandering around and picking things up', and the items she collects in this way make their way into her art. A work like Untitled No. 10, a large container woven from elm bark filled with orderly rows of stones, shell, driftwood and seaweed in the Christchurch Art Gallery collection, shows how Wilson brings the natural environment into the gallery space. She says:

'The work is about contrast, putting organic materials in an art gallery space – I feel it makes a much stronger statement, it could be called an interruption.'

== Major exhibitions and collection ==
Wilson's major exhibition include Tall Poppies (1994, The Dowse Art Museum and touring in New Zealand), Earthwalk: Judy McIntosh Wilson: A Survey 1981-1998 (1998, The Dowse Art Museum and the McDougall Art Annex, Christchurch) and Making Tracks (2004, Christchurch Art Gallery). In 1994 she was commissioned to make a permanent outdoor work, Two Craters, for the Krakamarken nature art park in Randers, Denmark.

Wilson's work is held by The Dowse Art Museum, Christchurch Art Gallery, the Southland Museum and Art Gallery, Invercargill, and a number of New Zealand government departments.

== Further sources ==
- Laurence Fearnley; The Dowse Art Museum, Earthwalk: Judy McIntosh Wilson: A Survey 1981-1998, (Lower Hutt: Hutt City Council, 1998) ISBN 0-9583414-1-9
