= Federation of Islamic Associations of New Zealand =

New Zealand Islamic federation

Logo of the Federation of Islamic Associations of New Zealand

The Federation of Islamic Associations of New Zealand (FIANZ) was set up in April 1979 by Mazhar Krasniqi and other Muslim community leaders to draw together the regional Islam organisations of Auckland, Wellington and Canterbury into one centralised New Zealand-wide body.

== History ==
=== Origins ===
Following the creation of the Muslim Association of Canterbury, local Muslims in Christchurch initiated correspondence with other Muslim organisations in Auckland and Wellington, with an eye towards creating a national Muslim organisation and helping to develop the Halal meat trade. On 18 November 1978 the first preparatory meeting was held in Christchurch : Hajji Abbas Ali and Robert "Abdul Salam" Drake (architect of the Ponsonby mosque) came representing Auckland; whilst Hajji Salamat Khan, Dr Hajji Khalid Rashid Sandhu and Abdul Rahman Khan came from Wellington; Palmerston North was represented by Ali Taal, a postgraduate student from Gambia. Following two meetings in Palmerston North on 6 February 1979 and Auckland on 15 April 1989, a consensus was reached and the Federation of Islamic Associations of New Zealand (FIANZ) was formally established. Auckland resident Mazhar Krasniqi (an Albanian SS Goya refugee from Kosovo) was the inaugural president, Dr Hajji Hanif Quazi was the first Secretary-General, and Haji Hussain Sahib was made the first FIANZ treasurer.

=== 1980s ===
In 1981, Sheikh Khalid Hafiz was appointed Imam of Wellington, a post he held until his death in 1999, and employed as such by the International Muslim Association of New Zealand. Soon after his arrival, he was appointed senior religious adviser to the Federation of Islamic Associations of New Zealand.

In June 1984, the Federation signed the first annual contract with the New Zealand Meat Producers Board (later the Meat Industry Association) to provide Halal certification services in exchange for a remuneration. The first contract was for $169,000 in 1984. Currently the figure is over one million dollars and helps subsidise much of the Islamic activities across New Zealand.

In April 1988, FIANZ held its first ever South Island AGM at the Canterbury mosque and Christchurch resident Dr Saleh Al Samahy from Saudi Arabia was elected president. A second South Island AGM was held at the mosque (in Riccarton) over 24–25 June 1989 where Dr Sandhu of Wellington was elected president and Dr Al Samahy was made vice-president. The following year a local convert to Islam, Soraiya Gilmour, was appointed FIANZ Treasurer.

=== 21st century ===
In November 2005, the Federation celebrated its 25th anniversary (a year late) and Eid al Fitr in Parliament House, Wellington. The event was attended by the then FIANZ president Muhammed Javed (Zaved) Iqbal Khan (originally from Fiji), the inaugural president Mazhar Krasniqi, and a former president Dr Hajji Muhammed Ashraf Choudhary.

In June 2008, the "FIANZ First Stakeholders Forum" was organised by New Zealand government civil servants at the parliament in Wellington. The theme was "To Build Strong New Zealand Muslim Families" but only a few Muslims were actually invited. Ultimately the only respected and interesting speaker was the Nigerian Dr Mustapha Farouk from Hamilton (whose name remains consistently misspelt in the FIANZ website). The following year, FIANZ organised the "FIANZ National Muslim Convention" over 24–25 October 2009 in Auckland and the theme was "Building Strong Muslim Families". This was attended by approximately 300 local Muslims. The most important speaker was Dr Mustapha Farouk and FIANZ Assistant Secretary Brent "Abdul Lateef" Smith (a Major in the New Zealand army).

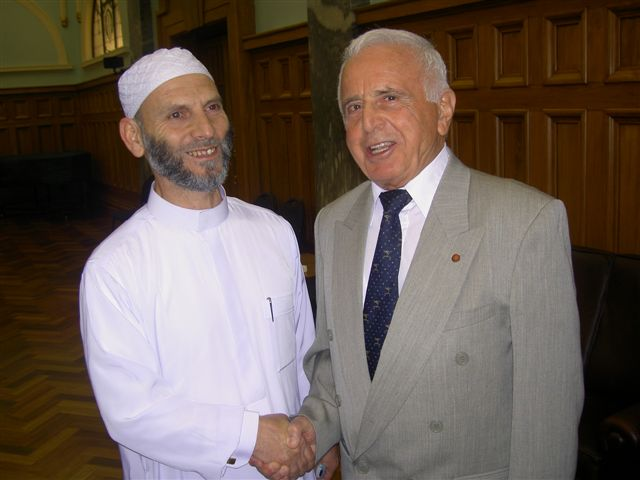
Sheikh Airot, Imam of Ponsonby Mosque (Auckland, New Zealand) and Mazhar Krasniqi, Q.S.M. Venue – Silver Jubilee celebrations of the Federation of Islamic Associations of New Zealand (FIANZ), 16 November 2005, Parliament House, Wellington, New Zealand.

In response to the Canadian alt-right activists Lauren Southern and Stefan Molyneux's planned tour of Auckland in early August 2018, the FIANZ's president Hazim Arafeh sent letters to the Immigration Minister, Ethnic Community Affairs Minister, and the New Zealand Human Rights Commission urging them to bar Southern entry on the grounds that she was abusing her free speech by promoting hatred against Muslims. On 6 July 2018, the Mayor of Auckland Phil Goff announced that the Auckland Council would not allows its venues to be used to promote "ethnic or religious tensions" and divisive speech. This forced the cancellation of Southern and Molyneux's tour due to the lack of other venues.

Following the Christchurch mosque shootings on 15 March 2019, FIANZ organised police and media briefings, facilitated meetings with central and local government agencies including Prime Minister Jacinda Ardern and the Christchurch City Council, organised meetings between affected families and the authorities, facilitated the return and burial of the deceased, provided victim support to survivors and their relatives, and memorial events. In late March 2024, FIANZ's chairman Mustafa Farouk disavowed comments made by Mt. Roskill Masjid E Umar mosque chairman Ahmed Bhamji claiming that the Israeli intelligence service Mossad was behind the Christchurch mosque shootings, stating that his remarks did not represent the views of New Zealand Muslims.

Following the outbreak of the Gaza war in October 2023, FIANZ called on political leaders to expel Israeli Ambassador Ran Yaakoby and to increase humanitarian aid to Gaza in mid November 2023. In January 2024, FIANZ organised a Muslim-Jewish interfaith forum to mark the 100th day of the Israel–Gaza war, which was attended by Muslims and Jews from anti-Zionist groups such as Sh'ma Koleinu Alternative Jewish Voices NZ. In late March 2024, FIANZ sent food supplies to refugees in Gaza and sent volunteers to support an international humanitarian team distributing food, medial and sanitary products to Gazans.

In early April 2024, FIANZ criticised the Justice Minister Paul Goldsmith's decision to abandon the previous Sixth Labour Government's efforts to introduce hate speech legislation addressing incitement on the basis of religious belief. FIANZ said that New Zealand "had a range of laws which prevented hateful speech about colour, race and national origins - but not religious belief." FIANZ chairperson Abdur Razzaq said that the Royal Commission into the Christchurch mosque shootings had concluded that religion was a "protected characteristic" and argued there was a clear link between hate speech and hate crimes. FIANZ has also expressed cautious support for the creation of a national intelligence and security agency to coordinate government agencies' responses to terror attacks. In late June 2024, FIANZ chairperson Razzaq said the submission process for the Government's proposed amendment to part 6 of the Arms Act was "non-democratic and would only benefit the gun lobby."

On 22 July 2025, FIANZ signed a peace and harmony agreement with the Holocaust Centre of New Zealand Incorporated, The New Zealand Jewish Community Security Group Charitable Trust, The New Zealand Jewish Council Incorporated, Dayenu: New Zealand Jews Against Occupation Incorporated, and His Highness the Aga Khan Council for Australia and New Zealand. The Rt Hon Dame Cindy Kiro, GNZM, QSO described its signing as "a landmark moment in interfaith relations in New Zealand... As Governor-General, I am honoured to receive this Harmony Accord – pledged and signed this day in the name of friendship and understanding and peace."

== Former FIANZ presidents (partial listing) ==
- 15 April 1979 – Hajji Mazhar Krasniqi, Q.S.M.
- 15 September 1979 – Hajji Abdul Rahim Rasheed, Q.S.O.
- 6 April 1980 – Rahim Ghouri
- 18 April 1981 – Hajji Abdul Rahim Rasheed, Q.S.O.
- 10 April 1982 – Hajji Abdul Rahim Rasheed, Q.S.O.
- 2 April 1983 – Mohammad Hanif Quazi
- 23 April 1984 – Hajji Muhammed Ashraf Choudhary, Q.S.O.
- 14 April 1985 – Hajji Muhammed Ashraf Choudhary, Q.S.O.
- 10–11 May 1986 – Hajji Khalid Rashid Sandhu, Q.S.O.
- 2 May 1987 – Hajji Khalid Rashid Sandhu, Q.S.O.
- 21–22 May 1988 – Hajji Saleh Al Samahy
- 24–25 June 1989 – Hajji Khalid Rashid Sandhu, Q.S.O.
- 8–9 September 1990 – Abdur Rahman Khan
- 1991 – Muhammed Azim Khan
- 30–31 May 1992 – Hajji Abdul Hafeez Rasheed
- 19–20 June 1993 – Imam Ali
- 6–7 July 1996 – Imam Ali
- 13–14 June 1997 – Hajji Anwar-ul Ghani
- 12–13 June 1999 – Hajji Anwar-ul Ghani
- 26–27 May 2001 – Hajji Anwar-ul Ghani
- 28–29 June 2003 – Muhammed Javed (Zaved) Iqbal Khan
- 18 July 2009 – Hajji Anwar-ul Ghani
- 26–27 May 2015 – Hazim Arafeh
- NB. By 2015, the FIANZ constitution had been amended on several occasions. Some presidents served terms of one year whilst others served two. To simply the information here, the dates and names presented are confirmed Annual General Meetings AND elections. Strictly speaking the elections are supposed to be held every "second quarter".

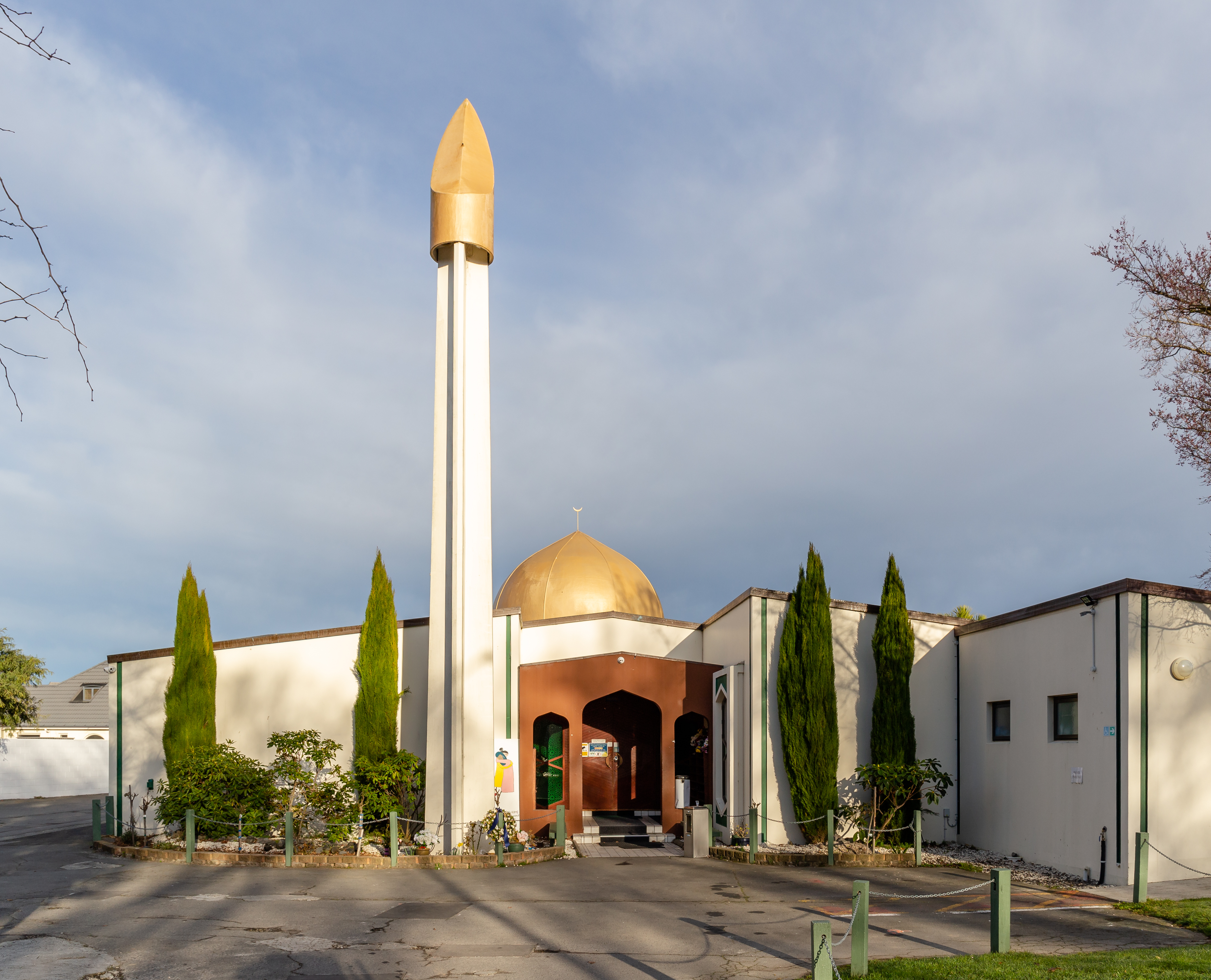
Canterbury Mosque, New Zealand; August 2019. Built over 1984–85, it was the world's southernmost mosque until 1999.

== Current executive committee ==
The current (2 August 2025) Executive Committee:

President – Ibrar Sheikh

Vice-President – Dr Mohammed Rizwan

Secretary – Abdirizak Abdi

Treasurer – Ikhlaq Kashkari

== Issues ==
Over the decades since its formation in 1979, with growing numbers of Muslims in New Zealand, there have been a number of complaints directed at the Federation.

A fundamental issue is whether FIANZ should be constituted primarily as a religious organisation, as a cultural one, or as a big tent for all NZ Muslims of all cultural origins. This issue came to a head in 1987, when (according to one scholar): the "effort of FIANZ to sue the New Zealand Listener over an offensive article failed in part because the Human Rights Commission would deal with religion but not with groups, while the Race Relations Office with groups but not religion... At one stage [FIANZ] sought to get Muslims defined as an ethnic group so that the case would come under the auspices of the Race Relations Office, which had powers to deal with such matters but did not deal with religion." This scholar questions "... whether Islam as such may be considered an ethnicity, given its strong communal concern and sense of ummah, a word that refers to the global Muslim community but also carries the sense of ‘nation’... some community leaders have drawn a distinction between being ‘Muslims in New Zealand’—that is, an immigrant community surviving in an alien environment—and being ‘Muslims of New Zealand’—that is, a community feeling at home here and developing forms of Islamic expression appropriate to New Zealand society."

In 2010, FIANZ leadership was described in a scholarly monograph "... as a conservative businessmen's club of relaxed Muslims, well integrated in New Zealand society and benignly sexist." Earlier, in 2006, this scholar had stated that the predominant intention of FIANZ seemed to be the "[c]leansing Islam of cultural ‘baggage’ and customs", for example by declaring that total veiling of a woman with a burqa is only a regional custom, and is not stricto sensu demanded by Islamic law. Another example is homosexual conduct. Even though this would not always be punishable with a death by stoning under Sunnah, according to this scholar NZ "Muslims saw with displeasure the voting behaviour of the only Muslim MP, Dr Ahsraf Choudhary." Choudhary was FIANZ president 1984-5; had voted in favour of the Civil Union Act 2004, which recognised homosexual partnership; and had abstained on the Prostitution Law Reform Act 2003.

Other lingering criticisms reflect cultural matters. Despite a concern with the "public" appearance of following the Sunnah, the Federation has sometimes created the impression of acting as a personal vehicle for certain office bearers. On occasion highly subjective evaluations appear to have decided some issues rather than any discernable long term goals. Questions have been raised in the past regarding appointments to posts within the Federation apparatus.

FIANZ was criticised, in a press release issued 22 July 2025, by twenty other organisations representing Muslims in New Zealand, and by eighteen Imams and Ulama, for having negotiated the terms of the Peace and Harmony Accord without consulting with them to address their concerns about a draft of the accord which had been communicated with them only through a "non-official channel". President Dr Muhammad Sajjad Naqvi of the Islamic Council of New Zealand (ICONZ), which represents New Zealand Shia Muslims, said the Accord misframed the problem as being between religions. Co-founder of Alternative Jewish Voices Marilyn Garson said the government should be more focused on the legal actions it should take rather than creating another multi-faith organisation. Garson also objected that, "[as] currently formulated, the council includes no direct Palestinian representation. That's not good enough. How can there be credible discussion of Aotearoa's ethnic safety - let alone advocacy for international action - without Palestinians?" FIANZ spokesperson Abdur Razzaq defended the Accord, characterising it as a good start, and saying that he wanted other faith groups and tangata whenua to be brought in. "Nothing has been formalised in terms of the work programme, nothing has been formalised in terms of the membership or the terms of reference. This is the start of the conversation. And in the start of the conversation, we have to consult widely with our community."
