= New Zealand Muslim Association =

New Zealand Islamic institution

Logo of the New Zealand Muslim Association.

New Zealand Muslim Association (NZMA) established in 1950 is the oldest Islamic institution in New Zealand. The New Zealand Muslim Association (NZMA) was formed in the year 1950, with the objective to serve all Muslims brothers and sisters within New Zealand. The first chairman of NZMA was Marhum Suilman Ismail Bhikoo. He was instrumental in establishing a Muslim burial ground at Waikumete Cemetery in Glen Eden, West Auckland in 1966. Former presidents of the NZMA include Kosovo-born Mazhar Krasniqi (1975 and 1987–88) and Nazmi Mehmeti from North Macedonia (1963). The longest serving Executive Committee member between 1956 and 1981 was Hajji Avdo Musovich (1919–2001), originally from Montenegro. NZMA is responsible for the five branches; Ponsonby mosque, Ranui mosque, Avondale Islamic Centre, Birkenhead Islamic Centre and Kelston Islamic Centre.

== List of mosques ==
=== Ponsonby Mosque ( Al-Masjid Al-Jamie) ===
On 30 March 1979 the foundation for the Ponsonby Mosque was laid. The Ponsonby Mosque was the first in New Zealand. The Mosque was extended in 1986, creating a ladies' praying area, accommodation for the Imam, kitchen facilities, Janaza washing room and additional prayer hall for Jumma prayers. The Ponsonby Mosque was re-named to Al-Masjid Al-Jamie to give the mosque an Islamic name in the late 20th century. Today the Al-Masjid Al-Jamie has a total capacity of 700 people.

=== Avondale Islamic Centre ===
Avondale Islamic Centre (AIC), in Avondale, Auckland, New Zealand was first opened in 1998, and closed temporarily in 2014-2015. Primarily serves as a mosque, providing a place to conduct the five daily prayers and extra devotional prayers such as Ramadan night prayers (tarawih) for males and females. However, the Centre also offers a number of wide ranging services, including event hosting facilities, teaching and a multi-purpose area with a car park for over 40 vehicles.

=== West Auckland Mosque (WAM) - Ranui ===
West Auckland Mosque & Islamic Centre is the 3rd Mosque in New Zealand built in June 1995. West Auckland Mosque provides 5 daily prayers with Jamat, Juma, Full Quran Tarawih prayers, Youth programs, ladies programs and Daily madrasah classes and now Adult Quran classes. Today approx.2,500 Muslims live in West Auckland and over +500 households. The mosque can accommodate up to 400 people with up to 30 car parks.

=== Birkenhead Islamic Centre ===
Birkenhead Islamic Center a branch of NZMA, was formed on 4 June 2006 but opened for regular prayers in 2010 for residents of North Shore of Auckland, which comprises many suburbs, such as Birkenhead, Birkdale, Beach Haven, Glenfield, Wairau Park, Hilcrest, Foresthill, Takapuna, Bayswater, Devonport, Cambles Bay, Mairangi Bay, Browns Bay, Long Bay, Upper Harbour, and Albany. That was the starting point, Alhamdulillah, due to the steadfast effort of the regular attendees of daily prayers and motivated Muslim brothers.

=== Kelston Islamic Centre ===
Kelston Masjid, previously under Abu Huraira Trust came into existence in August 2003. Prior to this, a group of local residents began congregating for Salah, Jummah & Tarawih prayers at Brother Azeem’s resident, which developed into the idea of establishing a local place of worship. As such, Abu Huraira Trust was formed and a property, previously mechanical workshop, was purchased. And so, began the journey of Kelston Masjid. On 16 August 2018, Abu Huraira Trust transferred the property to New Zealand Muslim Association (NZMA) Incorporated. Led by Brother Mohammed Fazal (administrator), NZMA-Kelston Branch was established and an interim committee appointed. The interim committee, with assistance from local worshippers, successfully continued all prayers and Islamic programmes, until a new committee was elected in February 2020.

== History ==
In 1959 the association purchased a house in Ponsonby, central Auckland, and converted it into the first Islamic Centre in the country. In 1960 the NZMA invited Ahmed Said Musa Patel from the Gujarat to become New Zealand's first Imam. In 1967 this house was sold and another bought; in 1972 this too was sold and another acquired at 17 Vermont Street, Ponsonby. In 1979 the house on this site was removed and construction work began to build New Zealand's first real mosque. Also in 1979 the NZMA was a founding constituent member of the Federation of Islamic Associations of New Zealand (FIANZ), the national Muslim organisation.
