= Ahmed Said Musa Patel =

Ahmed Said Musa Patel (16 January 1937 to 8 September 2009) was the first Imam (Muslim cleric) in New Zealand and served as the principal spiritual and religious advisor to the Islamic community from 1960 to 1986.

== Resources ==
- Bishop, Martin C. '“A History of the Muslim Community in New Zealand to 1980”, thesis submitted in partial fulfilment of the requirement for the degree of M.A. in history at the University of Waikato' (Waikato University, 1997).
- Drury, Abdullah, Islam in New Zealand: The First Mosque (Christchurch, 2007) ISBN 978-0-473-12249-2
