= Devenish-Meares =

Devenish-Meares, also spelt without the hyphen, is a compound surname composed of the names Devenish and Meares. The surname originated in County Westmeath, Ireland, with the marriage of John Devenish, of Portlick Castle, and Catherine (or Katherine) Meares, of Meares Court, in 1750. Some with the surname have become prominent in Australia in particular.

Notable people with the name include:

- Anna Maree Devenish Meares (born 1983), Australian track cyclist
- Arthur William Devenish Meares (1874–1935), Irish rugby union player
- Charles Leycester Devenish Meares (1909–1994), Australian judge and patron of the arts
- Frank Devenish Meares (1873–1952), Australian cricketer and Australian rules footballer
- Harrison Devenish-Meares (born 1996), Australian soccer player
- Isabella Devenish-Meares (born 1994), Australian singer known as Bella Ferraro
- Rochford Devenish-Meares (1948–2026), Australian rules footballer
- Stan Devenish Meares (1906–1994), Australian obstetrician and gynaecologist
- William Edward Devenish Meares (1848–1923), New Zealand cricketer
