= Denison (name) =

Denison is both a surname and a masculine given name. Notable people with the name include:

== Surname ==
- Albert Denison, 1st Baron Londesborough (1805–1860), British Liberal Party politician and diplomat, known as Lord Albert Conyngham
- Augusta Elizabeth Denison, wife of Arthur Wrottesley, 3rd Baron Wrottesley
- Anthony Denison (born 1949), American actor
- Brianna Denison (1988–2008), American college student and murder victim
- Daniel Denison (golfer), English professional golfer
- Daniel R. Denison, professor of management and organization
- David Denison (born 1950), British linguist
- Dimies T. Stocking Denison (1852–1940), American businesswoman, philanthropist and clubwoman
- Duane Denison (born 1959), American musician and founding member of the Jesus Lizard and Tomahawk
- Edmund Denison, chairman of the Great Northern Railway (Great Britain)
- Edward Denison (philanthropist) (1840–1870), English philanthropist
- Edward Denison (bishop) (1801–1854), English bishop
- Edward E. Denison (1873–1953), American congressman
- Edward Fulton Denison (1915–1992), American economist
- Ellery Denison (1900–1989), philatelist of Maryland
- Evelyn Denison (1800–1873), statesman, Speaker of the British House of Commons from 1857 to 1872
- Francis Napier Denison (1866–1946), Canadian meteorologist, inventor, seismologist, and astronomer
- George Denison, several people
- Hugh Denison (1865–1940), Australian businessman, born Hugh Robert Dixson
- John G. Denison, Former chairman of ATA Airlines and Global Aero Logistics
- Joseph Denison (banker) (1726–1806), English banker
- Joseph Denison (pastor) (1815–1900), American Methodist pastor and first President of Kansas State University (1863-1873)
- Mark R. Denison (born 1955), American physician and medical researcher on coronaviruses
- Oswald Denison, New Zealand rower
- Sean Denison (born 1985), Canadian basketball player
- Robert Denison (1697–1765), soldier and political figure in Connecticut and Nova Scotia
- Walter Denison, New Zealand lawn bowler
- William Denison (1804–1871), Lieutenant Governor of Van Diemen's Land, 1847–1855, and Governor of New South Wales, 1855–1861
- William Joseph Denison (c. 1726–1806), English banker, politician, landowner, and philanthropist

== Given name ==
- Denison Bollay (born 1952), software engineer
- Denison Cabral (born 1974), midfielder for the Baltimore Blast
- Denison Miller (1860–1923), first governor of the Commonwealth Bank of Australia
- Denison Olmsted (1791–1859), American physicist and astronomer
- Denison Witmer, indie singer-songwriter

== See also ==
- Dennison (surname)
