= Lawn bowls at the 1938 British Empire Games =

- Venue: Waverley Bowls Club
- Location: Sydney, Australia
- Dates: 5 February – 9 February 1938
- Competitors: 42 from 9 nations

Lawn bowls at the 1938 British Empire Games was the third appearance of the Lawn bowls at the Commonwealth Games.

Competition took place at the Waverley Bowls Club in Waverley, Sydney, Australia, from 7 to 9 February 1938.

Horace Harvey won the singles going undefeated, New Zealand won the pairs and fours (the latter after a gold medal play off).

New Zealand topped the medal table by winning two of the three gold medals available.

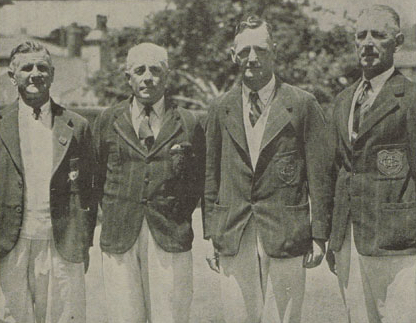
Far left Bill Whittaker and second from right Alec Robertson were both in the rinks gold medal team for New Zealand

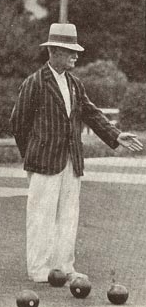
Walter Denison won the pairs gold medal

== Medal table ==
* Host nation (Australia)

Rank	Nation	Gold	Silver	Bronze	Total
1	New Zealand	2	1	0	3
2	South Africa	1	1	1	3
3	Australia*	0	1	2	3
Totals (3 entries)		3	3	3	9

== Medallists ==
All events were for men only.

Event	Gold	Silver	Bronze
Singles	(South Africa) Horace Harvey	(New Zealand) Frank Livingstone	(Australia) Jack Low
Pairs	(New Zealand) Walter Denison and Lance Macey	(Australia) Percy Hutton and Howard Mildren	(South Africa) D.A. Adamson and J.R. Appleford
Fours/Rinks	(New Zealand) Alec Robertson; Ernie Jury; Bill Bremner; Bill Whittaker	(South Africa) F. Stevenson; J. G. Donaldson; Norman Walker; T. H. Samson	(Australia) Aub Murray; Charlie McNeill; Harold Murray; Tom Kinder

== Men's singles – round robin ==
=== Results ===
Round	Date	Tie 1	Tie 2	Tie 3
Round 1	Feb 7	Nzl 25 Eng 18	SAf 25 Rho 17	Aus 25 Ire 9
Round 2	Feb 7	SAf 25 Eng 11	Nzl 25 Ire 9	Aus 25 Rho 13
Round 3	Feb 8	Eng 25 Rho 19	SAf 25 Ire 14	Nzl 25 Aus 12
Round 4	Feb 8	Ire 26 Rho 17	SAf 26 Nzl 19	Aus 25 Eng 9
Round 5	Feb 9	Eng 24 Ire 10	Nzl 26 Rho 9	SAf 25 Aus 15

Pos	Player	P	W	L	Pts
1	(South Africa) Horace Harvey	5	5	0	10
2	(New Zealand) Frank Livingstone	5	4	1	8
3	(Australia) Jack Low	5	3	2	6
4	(England) Tommy Hills	5	2	3	4
5	(Northern Ireland) L. W. Clarke	5	1	4	2
6	(Southern Rhodesia) A Bourne	5	0	5	0

== Men's pairs – round robin ==
=== Results ===
Round	Date	Tie 1	Tie 2	Tie 3
Round 1	Feb 7	Nzl 21 Eng 20	SAf 36 Sco 8	Aus 23 Fij 10
Round 2	Feb 7	Sco 21 Eng 18	Fij 21 Nzl 20	SAf 29 Aus 19
Round 3	Feb 8	Eng 27 Fij 11	Aus 38 Sco 8	Nzl 24 SAf 13
Round 4	Feb 8	SAf 21 Fij 17	Aus 27 Eng 13	Nzl 25 Sco 21
Round 5	Feb 9	Nzl 25 Aus 21	Eng 21 SAf 17	Sco 13 Fij 22

Pos	Player	P	W	D	L	Pts
1	(New Zealand) Lance Macey & Walter Denison	5	4	0	1	8
2	(Australia) Percy Hutton & Howard Mildren +	5	3	0	2	6
3	(South Africa) D A Adamson & J R Appleford	5	3	0	2	6
4	(England) Samuel Jones & Ronald Weeks	5	2	0	3	4
5	(Fiji) Annesley Benjamin & J Taylor	5	2	0	3	4
6	(Scotland) Alexander Templeton & James McAlpine	5	1	0	4	2

+ Hutton & Mildren defeated Adamson & Appleford 13–12 in a play off to win the silver medal

== Men's rinks (fours) – round robin ==
=== Results ===
Round	Date	Tie 1	Tie 2	Tie 3
Round 1	Feb 7	Aus 27 Eng 13	Nzl 26 Fij 11	SAf 21 Can 13
Round 2	Feb 7	Eng 28 Fij 16	Nzl 21 Can 19	Aus 25 SAf 18
Round 3	Feb 8	SAf 29 Eng 11	Nzl 19 Aus 14	Can 21 Fij 14
Round 4	Feb 8	SAf 17 Nzl 16	Aus 28 Fij 17	Can 32 Eng 14
Round 5	Feb 9	Nzl 22 Eng 12	Can 21 Aus 20	SAf 30 Fij 12

Pos	Player	P	W	D	L	Pts
1	(New Zealand) Bill Bremner (skip), Alec Robertson, Ernie Jury, Bill Whittaker +	5	4	0	1	8
2	(South Africa) J G Donaldson (skip), F Stevenson, Norman Snowy Walker, T H Samson	5	4	0	1	8
3	(Australia) Tom Kinder (skip), Aub Murray, Charlie McNeill, Harold Murray ++	5	3	0	2	6
4	(Canada) R Gray (skip), Arthur Reid, Jim Flemming, R. Adam	5	3	0	2	6
5	(England) James Cuthbert (skip), Edward Tappenden, Edward Shuttle, George Hiscock	5	1	0	4	2
6	(Fiji) Ernest Dobell (skip), Frederick Clapcott, S. Coffey, W. E. Lindsay	5	0	0	5	0

- + New Zealand defeated South Africa 19–16 in a play off to win the gold medal
- ++ Australia defeated Canada 30–10 in a play off to win the bronze medal

== See also ==
- List of Commonwealth Games medallists in lawn bowls
- Lawn bowls at the Commonwealth Games
