= Dennison (surname) =

Dennison is an English surname. Though the surname originates in England it can also sometimes be found in Scotland.

== Geographical distribution ==
At the time of the United Kingdom Census of 1901 (the data for Ireland) and the United Kingdom Census of 1881 (the data for the rest of the United Kingdom), the frequency of the surname Dennison was highest in the following counties:

1. Westmorland (1: 973)
2. Orkney (1: 1,286)
3. Rutland (1: 2,145)
4. County Leitrim (1: 2,672)
5. Yorkshire (1: 3,147)
6. Cumberland (1: 3,267)
7. County Sligo (1: 3,836)
8. County Down (1: 3,920)
9. Essex (1: 4,400)
10. County Antrim (1: 6,026)

As of 2014, the frequency of the surname was highest in the following countries:

1. Northern Ireland (1: 6,870)
2. New Zealand (1: 8,694)
3. England (1: 14,222)
4. Republic of Ireland (1: 14,768)
5. Wales (1: 15,271)
6. Jamaica (1: 19,007)
7. Scotland (1: 19,703)
8. United States (1: 19,795)
9. Canada (1: 25,342)
10. Australia (1: 25,755)

As of 2014, 60.4% of all known bearers of the surname Dennison were residents of the United States. The frequency of the surname was higher than national average in the following U.S. states:

1. West Virginia (1: 3,361)
2. Maine (1: 3,563)
3. Kentucky (1: 4,556)
4. Ohio (1: 8,743)
5. Montana (1: 8,863)
6. Indiana (1: 11,625)
7. New Mexico (1: 11,703)
8. Tennessee (1: 13,078)
9. Maryland (1: 13,251)
10. Vermont (1: 14,303)
11. Illinois (1: 14,343)
12. Arizona (1: 15,871)
13. Utah (1: 17,086)
14. Wyoming (1: 17,257)
15. Florida (1: 17,589)
16. New Hampshire (1: 18,009)
17. Colorado (1: 18,113)
18. Missouri (1: 18,180)
19. Pennsylvania (1: 18,374)
20. Delaware (1: 18,426)
21. South Carolina (1: 18,886)

The frequency of the surname was highest (over 20 times the national average) in the following U.S. counties:

1. Braxton County, W.Va. (1: 109)
2. Grayson County, Ky. (1: 295)
3. Gilmer County, W.Va. (1: 361)
4. Hart County, Ky. (1: 364)
5. Harding County, S.D. (1: 421)
6. Stark County, Ill. (1: 492)
7. Washington County, Maine (1: 546)
8. Montezuma County, Colo. (1: 557)
9. Edmonson County, Ky. (1: 574)
10. Knox County, Maine (1: 618)
11. De Baca County, N.M. (1: 636)
12. Harrison County, W.Va. (1: 683)
13. Scotland County, Mo. (1: 703)
14. Clearwater County, Idaho (1: 715)
15. Scott County, Ill. (1: 746)
16. Gallatin County, Ill. (1: 774)
17. Anderson County, Kan. (1: 790)
18. Barren County, Ky. (1: 812)
19. McKinley County, N.M. (1: 852)
20. Lee County, Va. (1: 868)
21. Cotton County, Okla. (1: 879)
22. Lewis County, W.Va. (1: 914)
23. Washington County, N.Y. (1: 928)
24. Oliver County, N.D. (1: 937)
25. Iron County, Mo. (1: 940)
26. Mercer County, Ill. (1: 952)
27. Lawrence County, Ohio (1: 953)
28. Harrison County, Ind. (1: 976)
29. Union County, S.D. (1: 989)

== People ==
Notable people with the surname include:

- Aaron Lufkin Dennison, American businessman and watchmaker
- Bonnie Dennison, American actress
- Christabel Dennison (1884–1924), British artist
- David Dennison (disambiguation)
- Doug Dennison (born 1951), American football player
- Elaine Dennison, professor in England and New Zealand
- Jim Dennison (1938–2026), American college sports coach
- Jo-Carroll Dennison (1923–2021), Miss America 1942
- Julian Dennison (born 2002), New Zealand actor
- Kate Dennison, British athlete
- Margaret Dennison (1920–2010), American politician from Ohio
- Richard Dennison, documentary producer
- Rick Dennison (born 1958), American football player
- Robert Dennison (disambiguation), including Robbie Dennison and Bob Dennison
- Tom Dennison (disambiguation)
- Walter Traill Dennison (1825–1894), Scottish writer and folklorist
- William Dennison (disambiguation)

== See also ==
- Denison (name)
