= Mears =

Mears or Meares may refer to:

== People ==
- Ainslie Meares (1910–1986), Australian psychiatrist and authority on medical hypnotism
- Anna Meares (born 1983), Australian cyclist
- Ashley Mears (born 1980), American sociologist
- Bob Mears (born 1933), American football coach
- Brian Mears (1931–2009), British author and former chairman of Chelsea Football Club
- Carl Mears, Senior scientist at Remote Sensing Systems
- Cecil Meares (1877–1937), Irish-born English chief dog handler on the Terra Nova expedition to Antarctica
- Chris Mears (baseball) (born 1978), Canadian baseball player
- Chris Mears (diver) (born 1993), British diver, Olympic champion
- Daniel Mears (born 1966), American criminologist
- Donna Mears, American politician from Alaska
- Eleanor Mears (1917–1992), Scottish medical practitioner and campaigner
- Gunner F. J. Mears (1890–1929), World War I soldier who became a successful artist after the war
- Frank Meares (1873–1952), Australian cricketer (also known as Frank Devenish-Meares)
- Frank Mears (1880–1953), Scottish planning practitioner
- Frederick Mears (1878–1939), American civil engineer
- Gus Mears (1873–1912) (Henry Augustus Mears), English businessman, founder of Chelsea Football Club
- Helen Farnsworth Mears (1872–1916), American artist
- Henrietta Mears (1890–1963), American Christian educator
- Joe Mears (1905–1966), chairman of the Football Association and Chelsea Football Club
- John Meares (1756–1809), English navigator
- Joseph Mears (1871–1936) (Joseph Theophilus Mears), English businessman, co-founder of Chelsea Football Club
- Lee Mears (born 1979), English rugby union player
- Leonard Frank Meares (1921–1993), Australian author
- Martha Mears (1910–1986), American actress and radio and film singer
- Nick Mears (born 1996), American baseball player
- Otto Mears (1840–1931), American builder of roads and railroads
- Ray Mears (disambiguation), several people
- Richard Goldsmith Meares (1780–1862), Anglo-Irish public official at the Swan River Colony
- Robbie Mears, Australian rugby league footballer
- Robert Mears, English physicist and Engineer
- Thomas Mears (1775–1832), Canadian businessman and politician
- Tracey Meares, American law professor
- Tyrone Mears (born 1983), Jamaican footballer with Burnley
- Walter Mears (1935–2022), Pulitzer Prize-winning American journalist
- William Meares (1848–1923), New Zealand cricketer
- A family of American racing drivers:
  - Casey Mears (born 1978), NASCAR driver, son of Roger
  - Rick Mears (born 1951), uncle of Casey and brother of Roger
  - Roger Mears (born 1947), father of Casey and brother of Rick

== Fictional characters ==
- Ernie Mears, from the BBC soap opera EastEnders
- Warren Mears, from the American television series Buffy the Vampire Slayer

== Places ==
- Cape Meares, a small headland on the Pacific coast of Oregon, United States
- Cape Meares, Oregon, a census-designated place in Oregon, United States
- Mears, Michigan, United States, a census-designated place
- Mears Ashby, a village in Northamptonshire, England
- Mears Peak, mountain in Colorado
- Mears Station, Virginia, an unincorporated community

== Other uses ==
- Mears & Co or Mears & Stainbank, British bell-founders in the 19th century
- Mears Fork, river in North Carolina, United States
- Mears Group, British housing and social care provider

== See also ==
- Kenneth Meers (1960–1992), American murder victim
- Meres (disambiguation)
- Mear One (Kalen Ockerman, born 1971), American graffiti artist
