= Daniel Denison =

Daniel Denison may refer to:

- Daniel Denison (golfer) (born 1985), English golfer
- Daniel Denison (colonist) (1612–1682), early settler and political and military leader of the Massachusetts Bay Colony
- Daniel R. Denison, professor of organization and management
- Danny Denison, English lawn and indoor bowler
