= Donnison =

Donnison is a surname. Notable people with the surname include:

- David Donnison (1926–2018), British academic and social scientist
- Ella Donnison (born 1975), English women's cricketer

== See also ==
- 10455 Donnison, a main-belt asteroid
- Dennison (surname)
