= Tappenden =

Tappenden is a surname. Notable people with the surname include:

- Dennis Tappenden (fl. 1980s), Canadian provincial policeman
- Edward Tappenden (1876–1944), English bowls player
- Nicola Tappenden (born 1982), English model
