= Samuel Jones (bowls) =

English bowls player

Personal information
- Nationality: {British (English)
- Born: 20 January 1867; Battersea, London, England
- Died: 15 November 1944 (aged 77); Coulsdon, London, England
- Occupation: Plumber/Builder

Sport
- Sport: Lawn bowls
- Club: Croydon BC

Samuel Jones (20 January 1867 – 15 November 1944) was a bowls international from England who competed at the British Empire Games.

== Bowls career ==
In 1937 Jones was selected for a tour of New Zealand and Australia, which culminated in the Empire Games.

Jones represented England in the 1938 British Empire Games at Sydney, in the pairs event and finished in fourth place with Ronald Weeks.

In 1935 he won the Surrey county pairs title with C E Cramp bowling for Croydon Bowls Club.

== Personal life ==
He was a plumber/builder by trade.
