= Harwood Jarvis =

Australian cricketer

Personal information
- Full name: Harwood Samuel Coombe Jarvis
- Born: 30 August 1884; Brompton, South Australia
- Died: 10 October 1936 (aged 52); Port Pirie, South Australia, Australia
- Batting: Right-handed
- Role: Wicket-keeper
- Relatives: Affie Jarvis (father); Fred Jarvis (uncle)

Domestic team information
- Years: Team
- 1905–1906: South Australia

Career statistics
Competition	FC
Matches	2
Runs scored	5
Batting average	1.66
100s/50s	0/0
Top score	3
Catches/stumpings	2/–
- Source: CricketArchive, 6 June 2013

Harwood Samuel Coombe Jarvis (30 August 1884 – 10 October 1936) was an Australian cricketer who played two first-class matches for South Australia during the 1905–06 season. Both his father, Affie Jarvis, and uncle, Fred Jarvis, had played cricket for South Australia, while his father had also represented Australia at Test cricket as a wicket-keeper. Jarvis' only two recorded matches came in late December 1905 and early January 1906, both fixtures in the Sheffield Shield. Playing as a wicket-keeper like his father, he debuted against Victoria at the Melbourne Cricket Ground, with his only other match coming several days later, against New South Wales at the Sydney Cricket Ground. Jarvis scored only five runs from three innings while batting, and took two catches. He played no further matches for South Australia, and died in Port Pirie in October 1936, in a motor accident, having worked as a contractor before his death. In four matches that season, South Australia used three wicket-keepers – Phil Newland, Percy Hutton and Jarvis – none of whom played any further matches for the state.
