= Dennison =

Dennison may refer to:

== Places ==
- In the United States
  - Dennison, Illinois
  - Dennison, Minnesota
  - Dennison, Ohio
  - Dennison Township, Luzerne County, Pennsylvania

== Other uses ==
- Dennison (surname)
- Dennison Manufacturing Company
- Dennison Watch, Swiss-based British watch brand and manufacturer

== See also ==
- Avery Dennison Corporation, formed from the merger of Dennison and Avery
- Dennison's, a brand of chili manufactured by ConAgra
- Denison (disambiguation)
