= Denison =

Denison may refer to:

== People ==
- Denison (name)

== Places ==
- Denison, Iowa
- Denison, Kansas
- Denison, Texas, birthplace of Dwight D. Eisenhower
- Denison, Washington
- Denison University, in Granville, Ohio
- the English name for Kosinj, a valley and region in Croatia

== Other uses ==
- Division of Denison, an Australian federal electoral division
- Division of Denison (state), a former Tasmanian electoral division
- Denison Mines, a Canadian mining company
- Denison smock, a combat jacket

== See also ==
- Saint Denis of Paris (3rd-century–250), Christian martyr and saint
- Dennison (disambiguation)
