= Howard Mildren =

Australian lawn bowler

Personal information
- Nationality: Australia

Sport
- Sport: Lawn bowls
- Club: South Park BC; Adelaide BC
Medal record
Men's Lawn bowls
Representing Australia
Commonwealth Games
Silver medal – second place	1938 Sydney	pairs

Howard Mildren was an Australian lawn bowls international who competed in the 1938 British Empire Games.

== Bowls career ==
At the 1938 British Empire Games he won the silver medal in the pairs event with Percy Hutton.

He was the 1938 Australian National Bowls Championships pairs winner when bowling with Hutton for the South Park Bowls Club in South Australia and was State champion in 1934 and 1951, the latter when representing the Adelaide Bowls Club.
