= Maurice Hutton =

Australian rules footballer, born 1903

Personal information
- Full name: Maurice Percy Hutton
- Nickname: Moggy
- Born: 21 March 1903; Parkside, South Australia
- Died: 20 February 1940 (aged 36); Mitcham, South Australia
- Original team: St Augustine's Church
- Height: 182 cm (6 ft 0 in)
- Weight: 79 kg (174 lb)
- Position: Defender

Playing career^{1}
Years	Club	Games (Goals)
1924–1929	Sturt	58 (0)
- ^{1} Playing statistics correct to the end of 1929.

Career highlights
- Sturt premiership 1926

Maurice Hutton
Personal information
- Batting: Left-handed
- Role: Batsman
- Relatives: Percy Hutton (father); Harvey Hutton (brother); Mervyn Hutton (cousin)

Domestic team information
- Years: Team
- 1928/29: South Australia

Career statistics
Competition	First-class
Matches	2
Runs scored	20
Batting average	5.00
100s/50s	0/0
Top score	7
Catches/stumpings	0/0
- Source: CricInfo, 29 August 2020

Maurice Percy Hutton (21 March 1903 – 20 February 1940) was an Australian rules footballer who played with Sturt in the South Australian Football League (SAFL), and cricketer who played in two first-class matches for South Australia in the 1928/29 Sheffield Shield.

Hutton was born at Parkside, South Australia in 1903. His father Percy Hutton and brother Harvey Hutton also played cricket for South Australia, as did his cousin Mervyn Hutton. He died at Mitcham, South Australia in 1940 aged 36.
