= Bill Bremner =

New Zealand bowls player

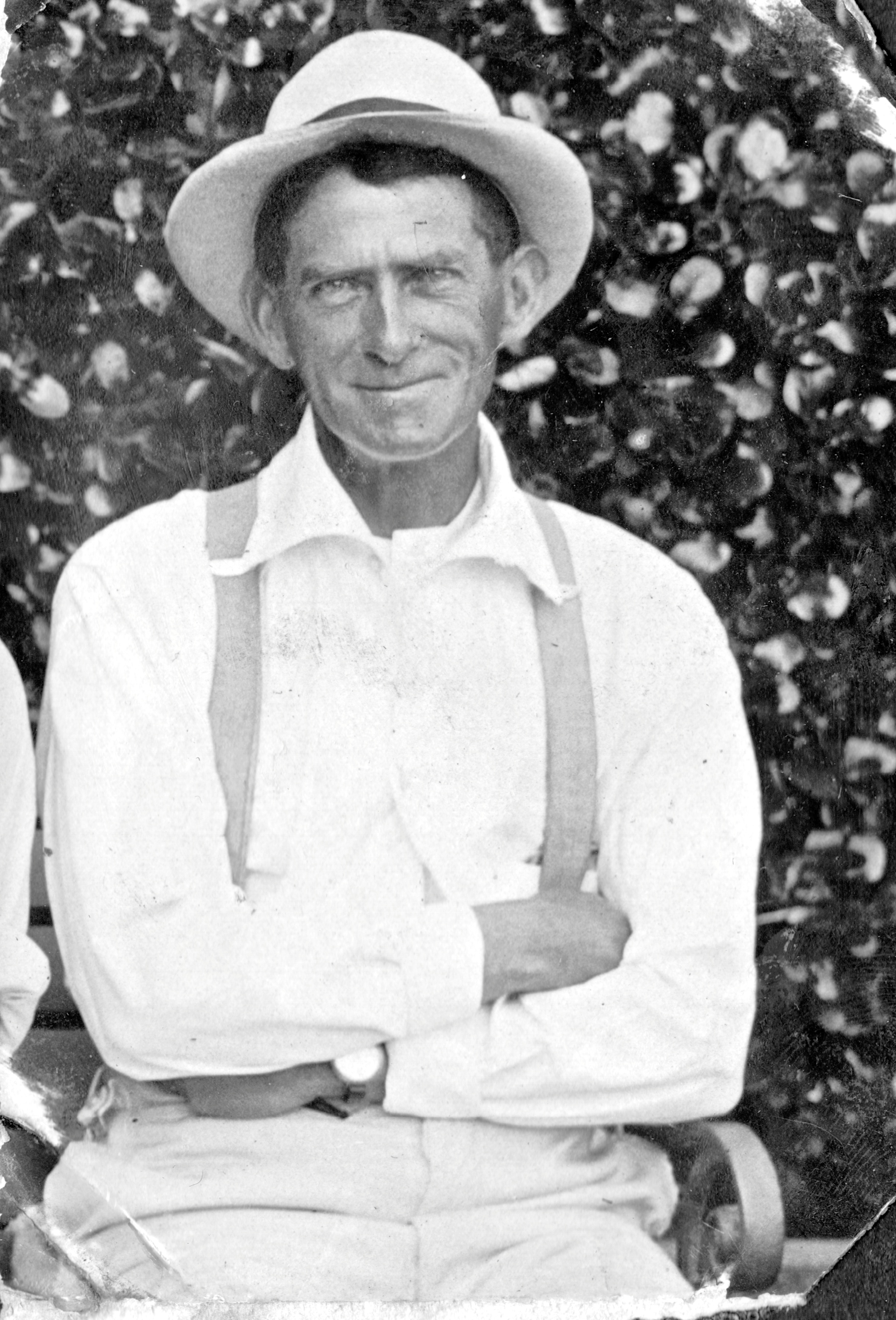

Personal information
- Born: Charles William Henry Chilcott Bremner; 25 March 1879 Dunedin, New Zealand
- Died: 4 November 1961 (aged 82) Auckland, New Zealand
- Height: 1.73 m (5 ft 8 in)
- Spouse: Alice Genevieve McLachlan (m. 1902; died 1949)

Sport
- Country: New Zealand
- Sport: Lawn bowls
- Club: West End Bowling Club, Auckland

Achievements and titles
- National finals: Men's pairs champion (1932, 1940); Men's fours champion (1924, 1929)
Medal record
Representing New Zealand
Men's lawn bowls
British Empire Games
Gold medal – first place	1938 Sydney	Fours

Charles William Henry Chilcott Bremner (25 March 1879 – 4 November 1961) was a New Zealand lawn bowls player who won a gold medal in the men's fours at the 1938 British Empire Games. He also won four national lawn bowls titles.

== Biography ==
Born in Dunedin on 25 March 1879, Bremner was the son of Mary Ann and George Goddard Bremner. He was educated in Dunedin, but spent much of his life in Invercargill, before moving to Auckland. He was a land agent and architect. On 26 December 1902, Bremner married Alice Genevieve McLachlan, and they had two children.

Bremner won four New Zealand national bowls championship titles, representing the West End Bowling Club from Auckland: the men's fours in 1924 and 1929; and the men's pairs in 1932 and 1940.

At the 1938 British Empire Games in Sydney, Bremner was the skip the men's four—with Ernie Jury, Alec Robertson and Bill Whittaker—that won the gold medal.

Bremner died in Auckland on 4 November 1961, having been predeceased by his wife in 1949. He was buried at Hillsborough Cemetery, Auckland.
