= Ernie Jury =

New Zealand bowls player

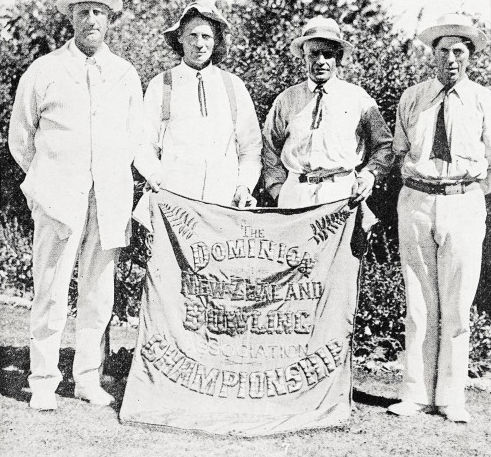
- Jury (second from right) as skip of the Karangahake four that won the fours title at the 1919 New Zealand national lawn bowls championships

Personal information
- Born: Ernest Jury; 19 April 1872 Ōakura, Taranaki, New Zealand
- Died: 6 June 1966 (aged 94) Whangārei, New Zealand
- Occupation: Carpenter
- Spouse: Jane McClymont (m. 1902; died 1944)

Sport
- Country: New Zealand
- Sport: Lawn bowls
- Club: Karangahake Bowling Club; Ponsonby Bowling Club

Achievements and titles
- National finals: Men's fours champion (1919, 1921)
Medal record
Men's lawn bowls
Representing New Zealand
Commonwealth Games
Gold medal – first place	1938 Sydney	Fours

Ernest Jury (19 April 1872 – 6 June 1966), also known as Nipper Jury, was a New Zealand lawn bowls player who won a gold medal in the men's fours at the 1938 British Empire Games. He also won two national lawn bowls titles.

== Biography ==
Born on 19 April 1872, Jury was the son of Eliza and Richard Jury. In 1902, he married Jane McClymont, and the couple had two children.

Jury won two New Zealand national bowls championship titles, as skip of the Karangahake Bowling Club team, in the men's fours in 1919 and 1921. He was the first player to skip a four to two titles at the national championships. Not long after, he moved to Auckland, and played for the Ponsonby Bowling Club.

At the 1938 British Empire Games in Sydney, Jury was part of the men's fours team that won the gold medal, along with Bill Bremner, Alec Robertson and Bill Whittaker.

Jury died on 6 June 1966, and was buried at Maunu Cemetery, Whangārei. He was predeceased by his wife, Jane, in 1944.
