= David Dennison =

David Dennison may refer to:

- David Dennison (cricketer) (born 1961), Irish cricketer
- David Dennison (pseudonym), one of three notable pseudonyms of Donald Trump, used to preserve anonymity in early proceedings of Stormy Daniels legal case through a non-disclosure agreement
- David M. Dennison (1900–1976), American physicist
- David S. Dennison Jr. (1918–2001), American politician in the US House of Representatives
