= Mervyn Hutton =

Australian cricketer

Personal information
- Born: 24 August 1911; Port Augusta, South Australia
- Died: 28 September 1988 (aged 77); Melbourne, Victoria, Australia
- Relatives: Percy Hutton (uncle); Maurice Hutton (cousin); Harvey Hutton (cousin)
- Source: Cricinfo, 9 August 2020

Mervyn Hutton (24 August 1911 – 28 September 1988) was an Australian cricketer. He played in one first-class match for South Australia in 1930/31.
