= Royal Garrison Artillery =

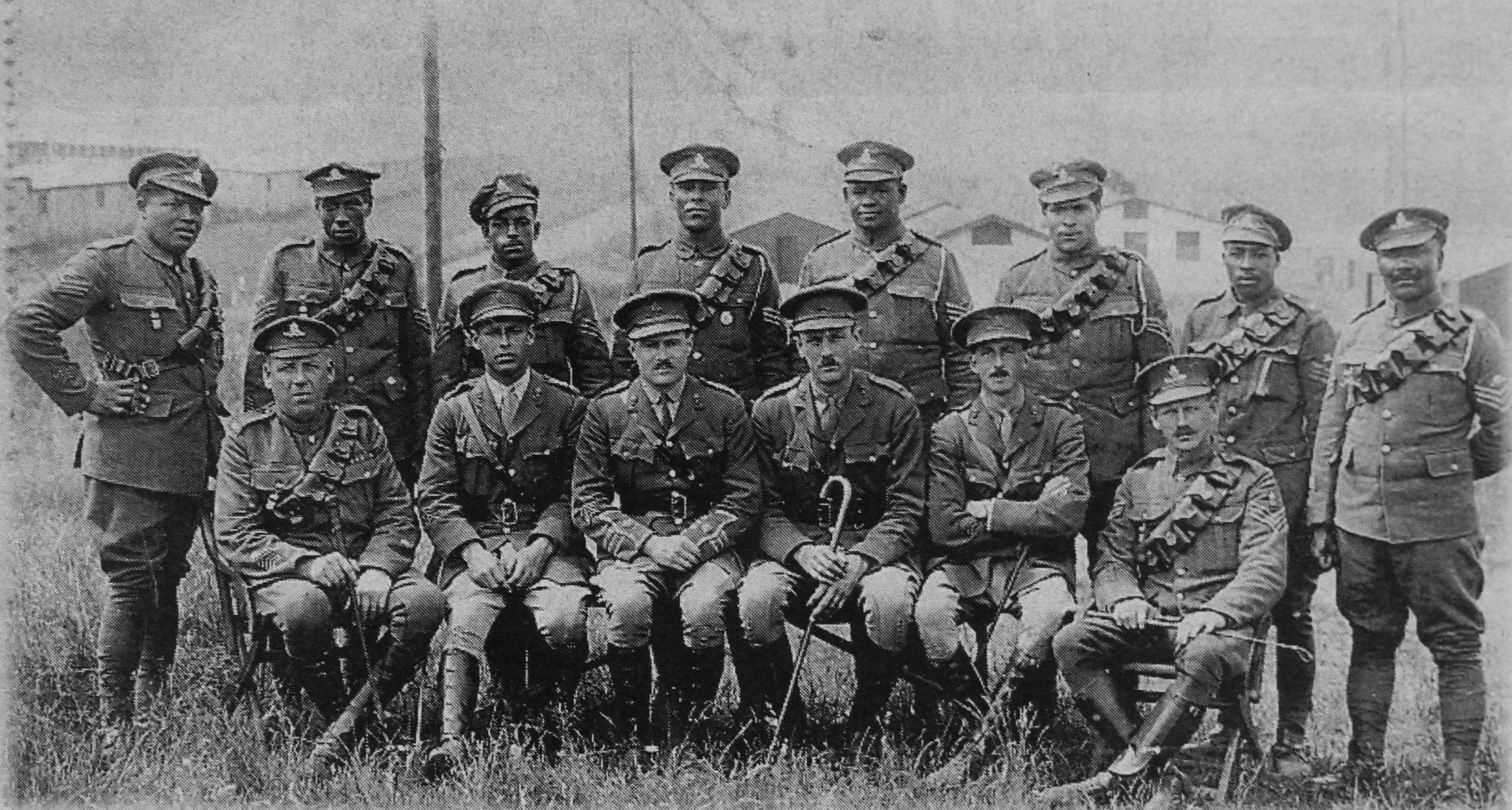
- Officers and senior enlisted men of the Bermuda Contingent of the Royal Garrison Artillery's draft to the Western Front, during the Great War. Part of a contingent from the part-time reserve, the Bermuda Militia Artillery
- Active: 1899–1924
- Country: United Kingdom
- Branch: British Army
- Mottos: Ubique Quo Fas Et Gloria Ducunt (Everywhere where right and glory leads us)

The Royal Garrison Artillery (RGA) was formed in 1899 as a distinct arm of the British Army's Royal Regiment of Artillery serving alongside the other two arms of the Regiment, the Royal Field Artillery (RFA) and the Royal Horse Artillery (RHA). The RGA were the 'technical' branch of the Royal Artillery who were responsible for much of the professionalisation of technical gunnery that was to occur during the First World War. It was originally established to man the guns of the British Empire's forts and fortresses, including coastal artillery batteries, the heavy gun batteries attached to each infantry division and the guns of the siege artillery. The RGA was amalgamated with the RFA in 1924, from which time the only two arms within the Royal Regiment of Artillery have been the Royal Artillery and the Royal Horse Artillery.

== Organisation ==
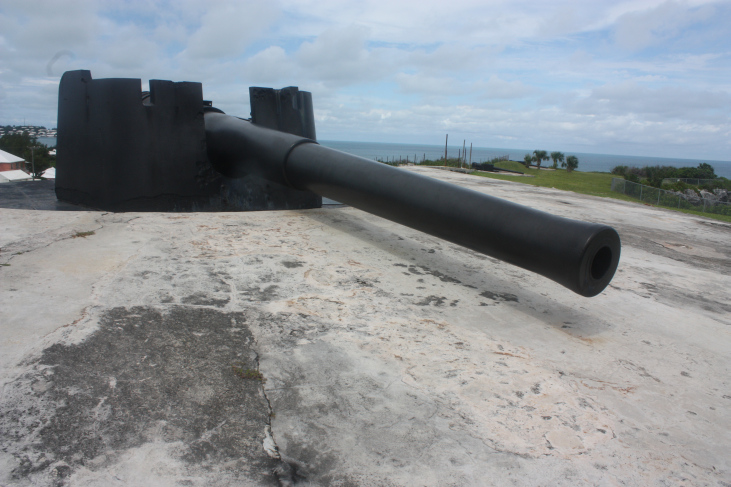
The defunct St. David's Battery, St. David's, Bermuda in 2011, historically manned by the RGA and the part-time reserve Bermuda Militia Artillery.

The Royal Garrison Artillery came into existence as a separate entity when existing coastal defence, mountain, siege and heavy batteries of the Royal Artillery were amalgamated into a new sub-branch. A royal warrant provided that from 1 June 1899:

"... the mounted and dismounted branches of the Royal Regiment of Artillery shall be separated into two corps... to be named respectively (a) the Royal Horse Artillery and the Royal Field Artillery: (b) the Royal Garrison Artillery."

The Royal Regiment of Artillery, thenceforth, was divided into four branches. Other than mounted or unmounted dress, the obvious distinction in uniform was by the shoulder title badges: RA (for the branch tasked with managing ammunition dumps and supply to units in the field); RGA; RFA; and RHA.

With the increasing importance of artillery defences by the mid-Nineteenth century (and the usual reluctance of the British Government to fund an expansion of the regular military forces), a military reserve artillery force became a pressing concern to aid in maintaining the fixed defensive batteries. Through the Eighteenth Century, and up to the end of the Napoleonic Wars and the American War of 1812, the military reserve forces that supported (but were not part of either) the British Army and the Board of Ordnance Military Corps (which included the Royal Artillery, the Royal Engineers, and the Royal Sappers and Miners) included the Militia, which was normally an all-infantry force, and the mounted Yeomanry. During wartime, these were supplemented by Volunteer units. Royal Artillery coastal batteries were often brought up to strength with drafts from the British Army or the militia, or by temporarily re-tasking militia units or raising volunteer artillery corps. In Bermuda, from the Seventeenth Century until after the American War of 1812, men with status and the required funds were appointed as Captains of forts (which spared them from any obligation to serve in the Militia), in command of fortified coastal batteries manned by volunteers through peace and war.

In 1852, with fear of an invasion of Britain by France, the reserve forces were re-organised. The Militia, which had become a paper tiger, changed from a conscripted force to one in which recruits voluntarily engaged for a term of service. It also ceased to be an all-infantry force. As the most critical shortage was of garrison artillery, a number of Militia Infantry regiments were re-tasked as Militia Artillery, and new militia units were raised as artillery. The Militia Artillery units, which (like other reserve units) were raised under the Lords-Lieutenants of counties, who appointed officers), and were all tasked with garrison duties at fixed batteries. The invasion scare also led to the re-establishment of the Volunteer Force as a permanent (though only part-time, except when embodied for emergencies) branch of the British military. This force (which differed from the Militia primarily in that its volunteers did not engage for a term of service, and might quit with fourteen days notice, except while embodied) contained a mixture of artillery, engineering and infantry units. Similar militia and Volunteer units were also raised in various British colonies.

During the latter half of the Nineteenth Century, the military forces were re-organised through a succession of reforms, with the Board of Ordnance abolished after the Crimean War. Its military corps, including the Royal Artillery, as well as its civilian Commissariat, transport and stores organs were absorbed into the British Army. The Militia and the Volunteer Force units were more closely integrated with the British Army, though remaining separate forces. In 1882 the Royal Artillery organised its garrison artillery units into 11 territorial divisions, which included the Militia and Volunteers. For a time the Militia Artillery units lost their individual identities, wearing divisional badges based on that of the Royal Artillery, except the scroll on the Royal Artillery badge inscribed "Ubique" (everywhere) was left blank, or covered in a depiction of laurel (as the Militia and Volunteer Force were both home defence forces, the members of which could not be sent abroad on expedition without their consent). Militia Artillery units were made up of part-time Militia officers and other ranks with a Permanent Staff made up of officers and senior other ranks seconded from the Royal Artillery, including a single officer acting as both Commandant and Adjutant (where a sufficiently qualified Militia officer was available to serve as Commandant, the adjutant remained a seconded Royal Artillery officer). In 1889 the 11 territorial divisions were amalgamated into three large divisions, but mountain artillery batteries were for the first time treated as a separate division of the garrison artillery.

In 1899 the garrison companies (manning coast, position, siege, heavy and mountain artillery) were constituted as the separate Royal Garrison Artillery. The territorial divisions were abolished on 31 December 1901 and the Militia and Volunteer Artillery units were re-titled as ---shire Royal Garrison Artillery (Militia) or (Volunteers) as appropriate. The badge adopted by the militia was the same as the regular Royal Garrison Artillery, including the "ubique" scroll, with a letter "M" fixed at the bottom of the gun badge, and on the grenade when the grenade badge was worn on a cap. When the Volunteer Force and the Yeomanry were merged to create the Territorial Force in 1908, the Militia was redesignated the Special Reserve. At the same time, plans were made to convert all of the Royal Garrison Artillery (Militia) units to Royal Field Artillery, but all were instead disbanded (although Militia Artillery units remained in some of the colonies, most notably the Bermuda Militia Artillery, which, like the Bermuda Volunteer Rifle Corps, formed part of the garrison of the important Fortress colony of Bermuda and was organised and funded from its creation in 1895 as part of the British Army, rather than a separate force). The Volunteer units were styled Defended Ports units and were incorporated into the Royal Garrison Artillery. They were allocated to the defence of ports around Great Britain

== Uniform ==
Until 1914 the Royal Garrison Artillery retained the badge and dress uniform (dark blue with scarlet facings plus blue cloth home-service helmet) of the Royal Regiment of Artillery. Personnel were normally clothed and equipped as dismounted men. After 1919 all Royal Garrison Artillery personnel were classified as mounted men, whether serving in horse-drawn, mountain or tractor-drawn batteries. In 1907 gilded metal shoulder titles reading R.G.A. were adopted for khaki service dress, to distinguish this branch from the Royal Horse Artillery (R.H.A.) and the Royal Field Artillery (R.F.A.)

== Coast Defence ==
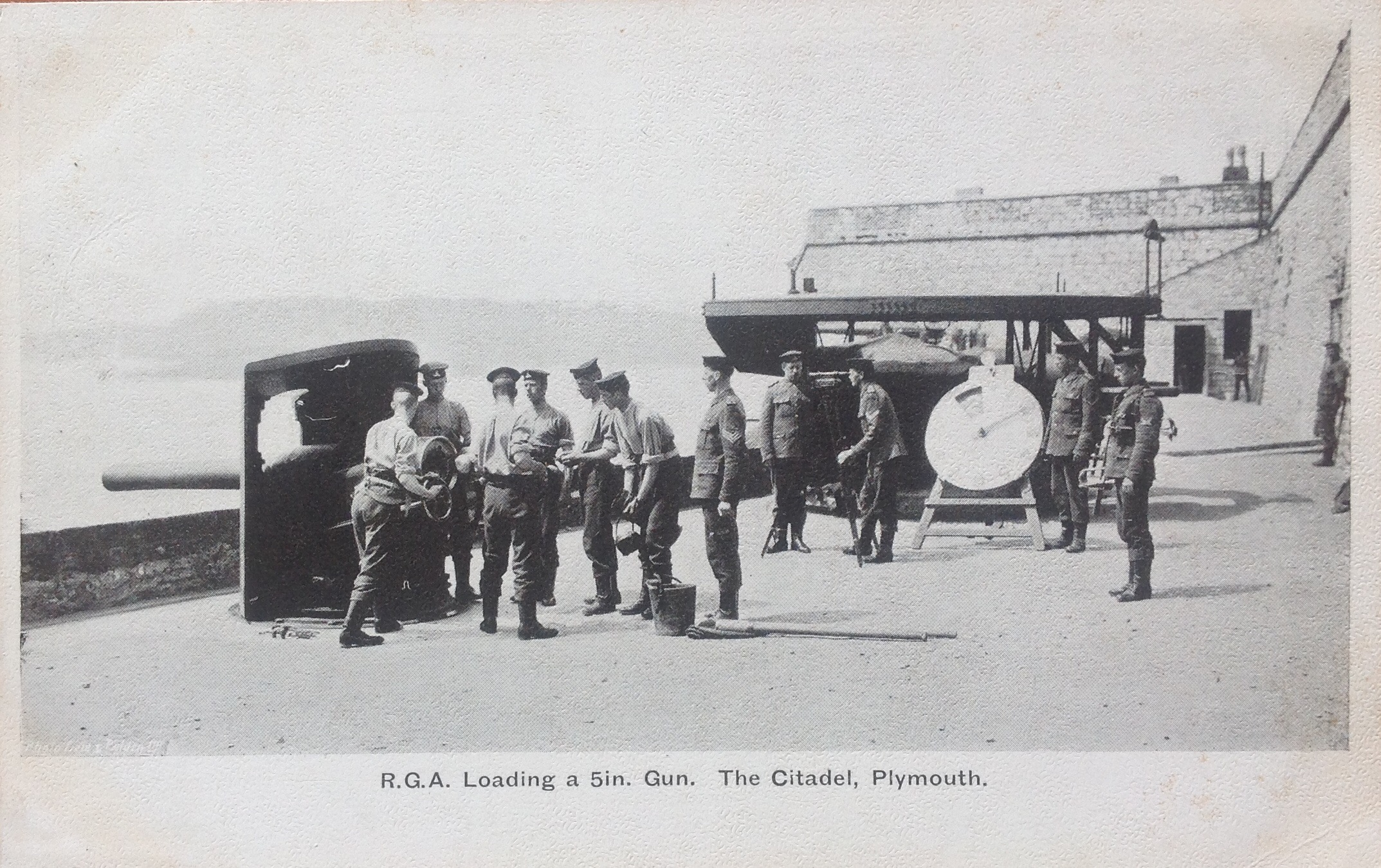
Royal Garrison Artillery training on various types of Coast Artillery equipment at the Royal Citadel, Plymouth, c1905

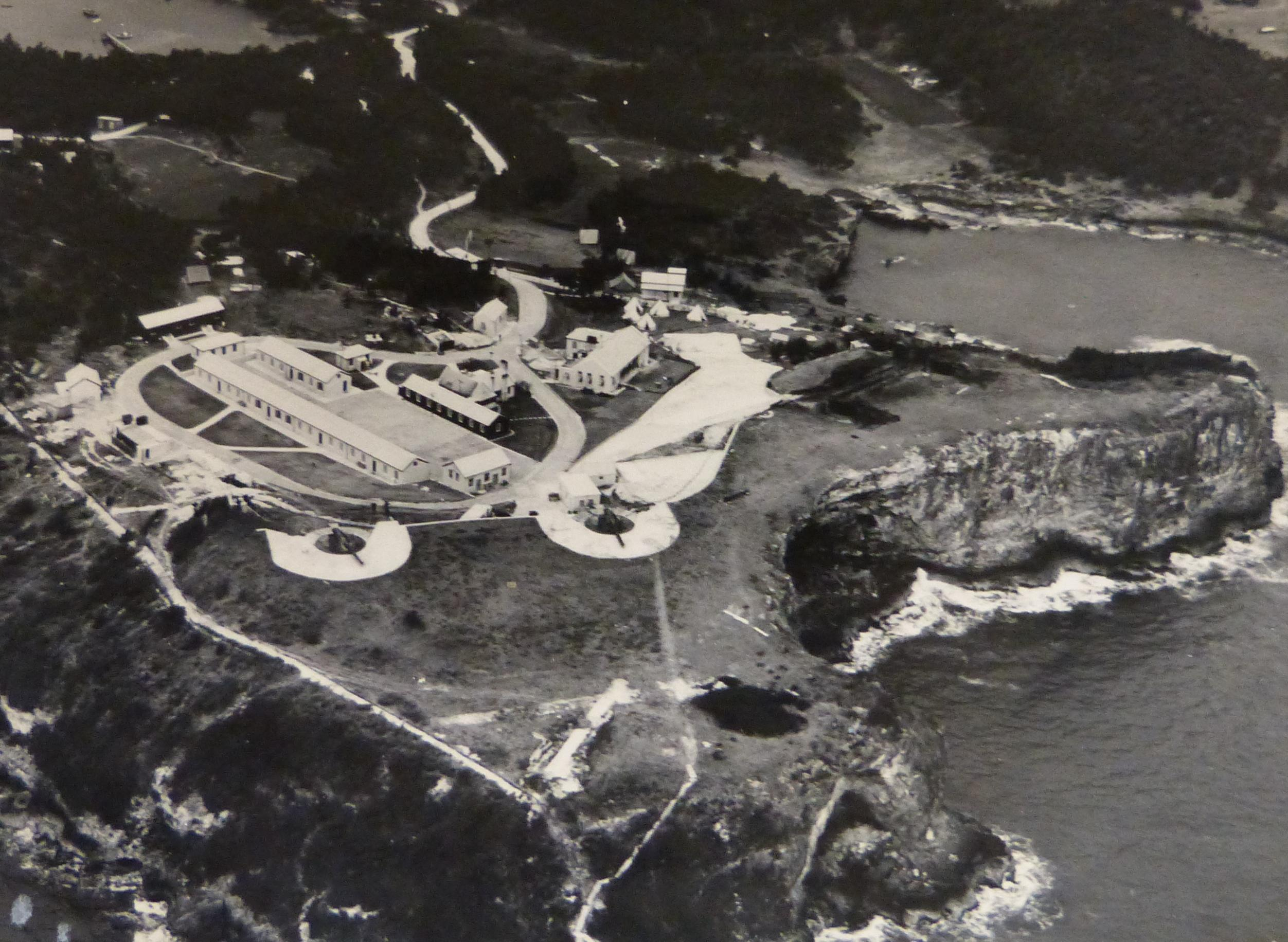
St. David's Battery, Bermuda, completed in 1910, with two 9.2" and two 6" guns

Fixed artillery (that which is not meant to move, other than for the purpose of aiming) was placed in forts and batteries in locations where they might protect potential targets (ports, cities, etc.) from attack, or from where they might prevent the advance of an enemy. This included forts and batteries intended to protect against military forces on the land, and against naval forces on the sea. Coastal artillery relied primarily on high velocity guns, capable of striking out at ships at a great distance, and penetrating their armour. Inland defensive batteries might have armament better suited for use against personnel. Mobile (field) artillery pieces were sometimes used that could be quickly re-deployed as required between fortifications that were not permanently manned or armed. Fixed batteries were operated in the early 20th century by the RGA, including its Militia Artillery and Volunteer Force reservists (often with support from other units, such as engineers operating searchlights for night-time firing).

Conventional wisdom held that a naval force would need a three-to-one advantage over coastal artillery, as the land-based artillery had the advantage of firing from a fixed platform, with resultant advantages in accuracy, especially as range increased. By the start of the 20th century, the increasing size of the capital ships of the world's largest navies, and of the guns they wielded, was already sounding the death knell of coastal artillery. As the primary armament of battleships and battle-cruisers reached 16 inches, while coastal artillery was typically 6 inch or 9 inch guns, a large naval force, including capital ships, could level coastal batteries from a range that kept them out of reach of answering fire. The advent of artillery had changed the design of fortifications centuries before, spelling the end of high-walled castles.

By the 20th century, fortifications were being designed with as much surrounding embankment by earthworks as possible. While this provided some protection from direct fire, it made defence against infantry more difficult, and did nothing to protect from high trajectory fire landing from above, or from air-bursting explosive shells, which rained the area enclosed by walls with shrapnel. In Bermuda, in the latter part of the 19th century, where the War Office had expended vast fortunes building up fortifications to protect the Royal Naval Dockyard, it was decided belatedly that the Dockyard's own fleet of naval vessels could provide a more effective defence. With the advent of the aeroplane, and the missile, fixed artillery was both obsolete and too vulnerable to continue in use. The last coastal artillery was removed from use in the 1950s.

== Air Defence ==
The emerging need for air defence of the United Kingdom was discussed between the Admiralty and the War Office prior to the outbreak of the First World War. In August 1914 the responsibility was still split, with the Royal Garrison Artillery employing 30 officers and 312 men on air defence duties. By February 1916 the army had entire responsibility for the air defence of the United Kingdom. In May 1916 56 companies of the RGA were created to command the guns. By November 1917 639 officers and 8,436 men of the RGA were manning anti-aircraft defences, as well as 4,309 men of the Royal Engineers and 424 men of the Army Service Corps (ASC).

== Mountain batteries ==
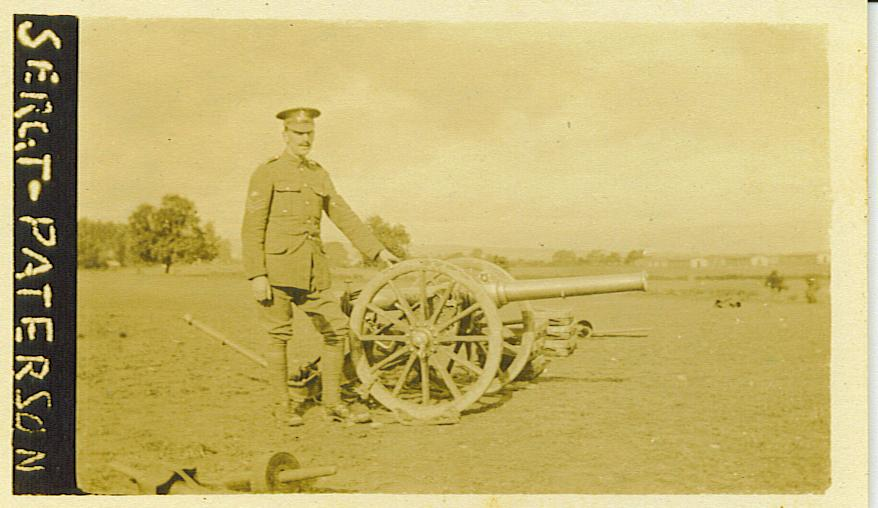
Sergeant Paterson, IV (4th) Highland (Mountain) Brigade, RGA, with 10-pdr mountain gun ca 1915

The batteries constituting the Mountain Division, Royal Artillery were also incorporated into the Royal Garrison Artillery in 1899. In 1918 there were 20 batteries which all served in India, Macedonia, Palestine and Mesopotamia. Three of these batteries were raised from the Territorial Force.

== First World War ==
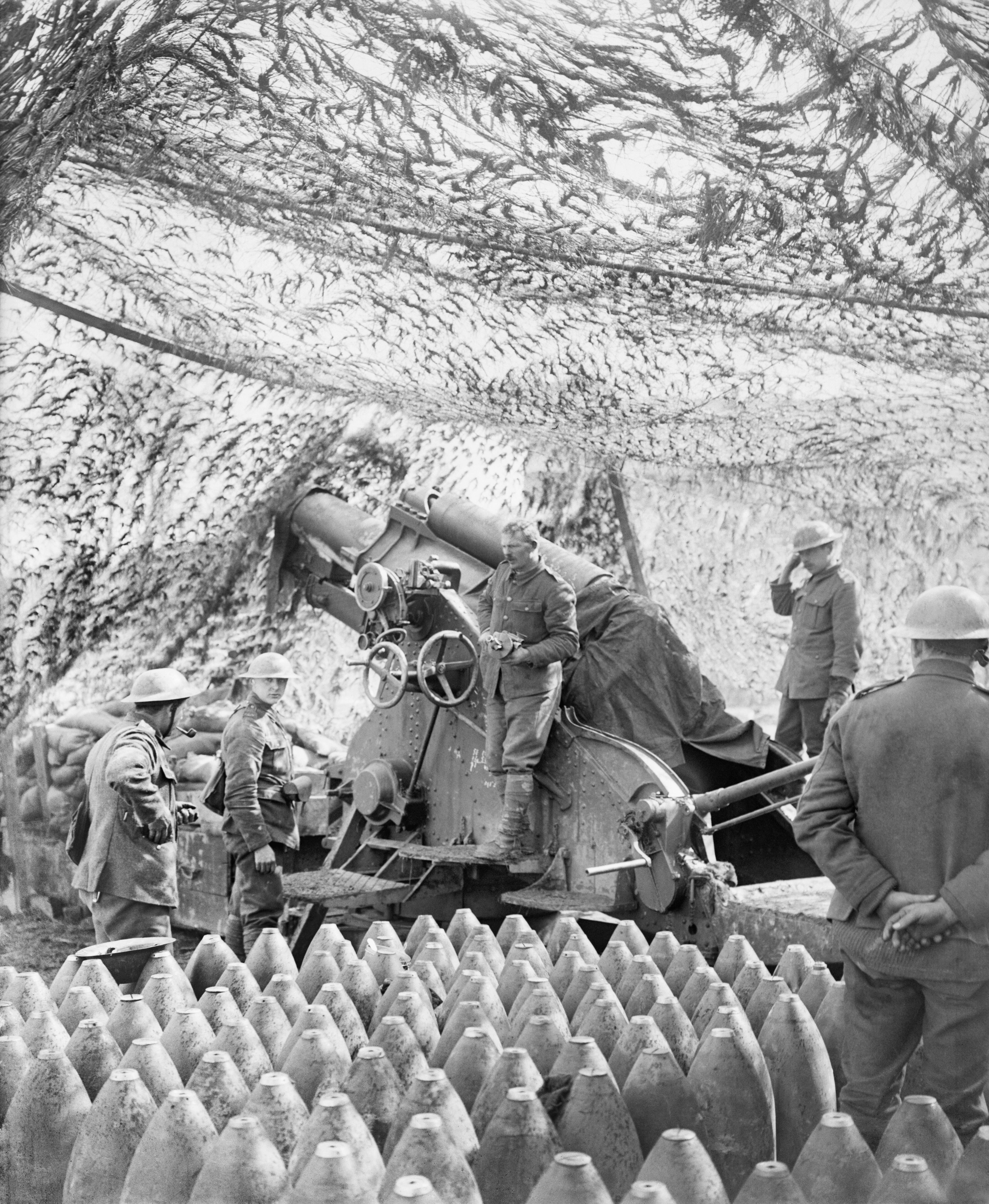
Royal Garrison Artillery 9.2" Howitzer of 91st Battery, Royal Garrison Artillery in position under camouflage netting in readiness for the opening barrage of Arras, 1 April 1917

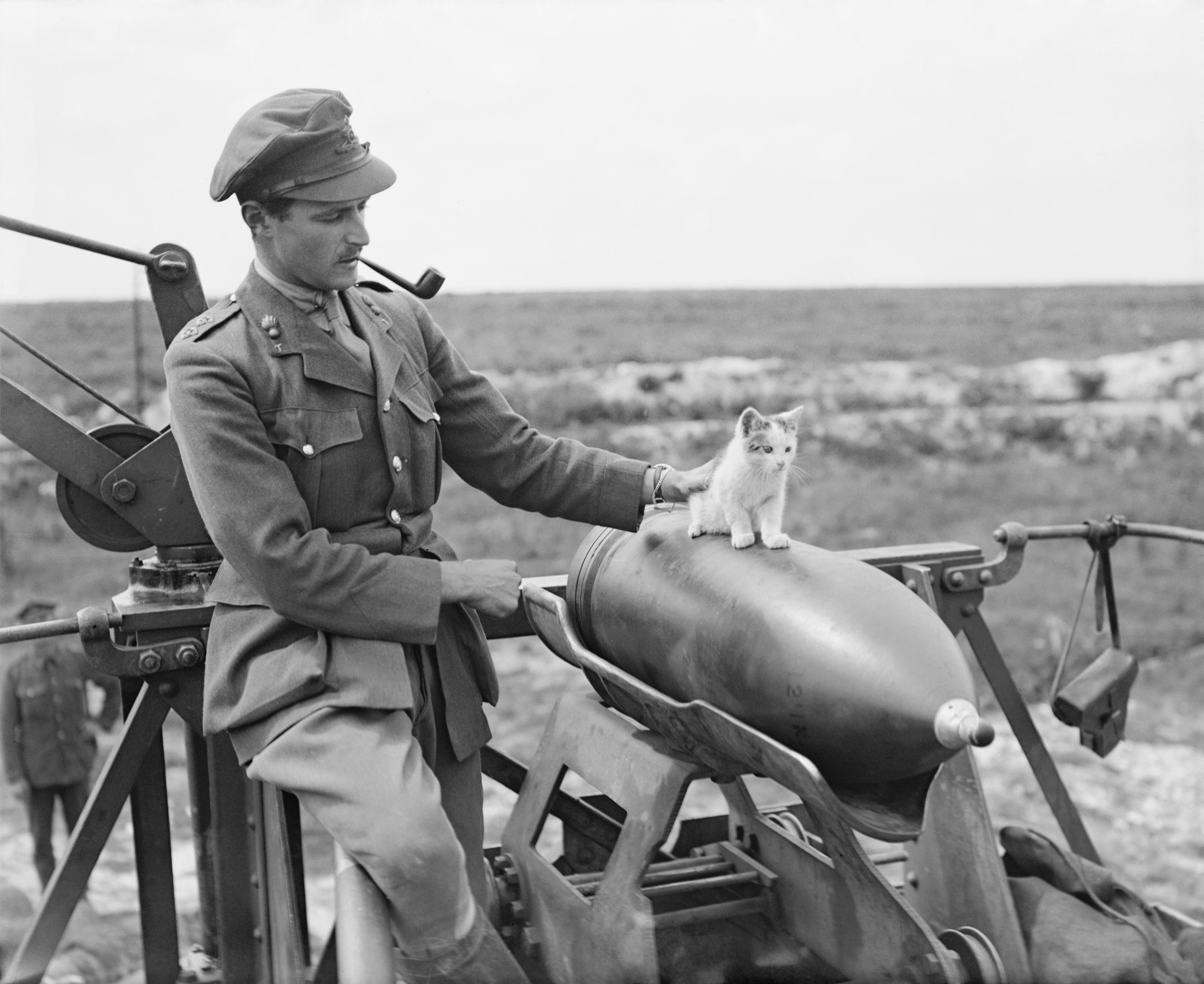
Officer of 444 Siege Battery and kitten, Mk V howitzer, near Arras 19 July 1918

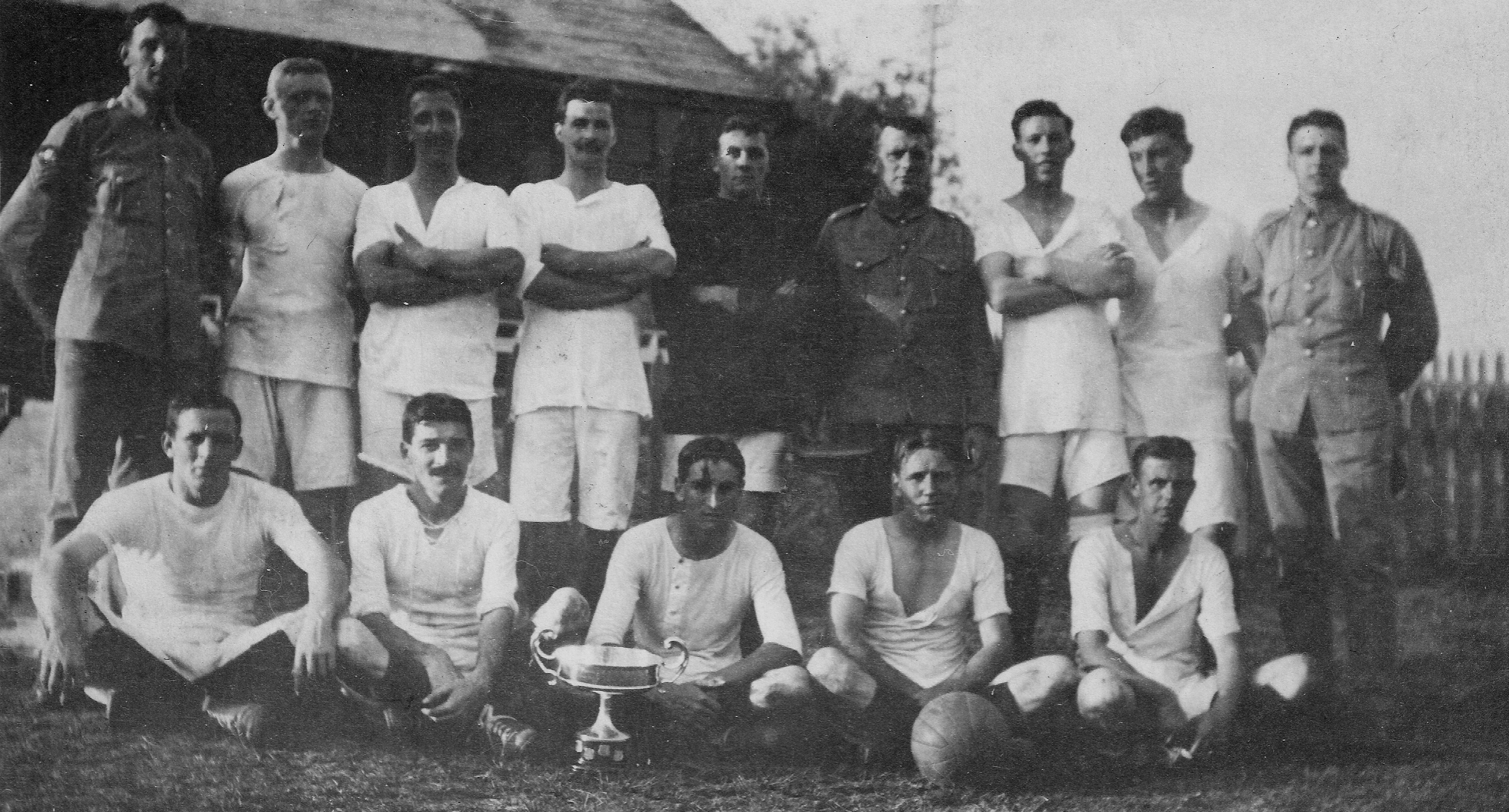
The football team of 95 Company, Royal Garrison Artillery, victors in the 1917 Governor's Cup football match, pose with the cup. The cup was contested for annually by teams from the various Royal Navy and British Army Bermuda Garrison units stationed in Bermuda.

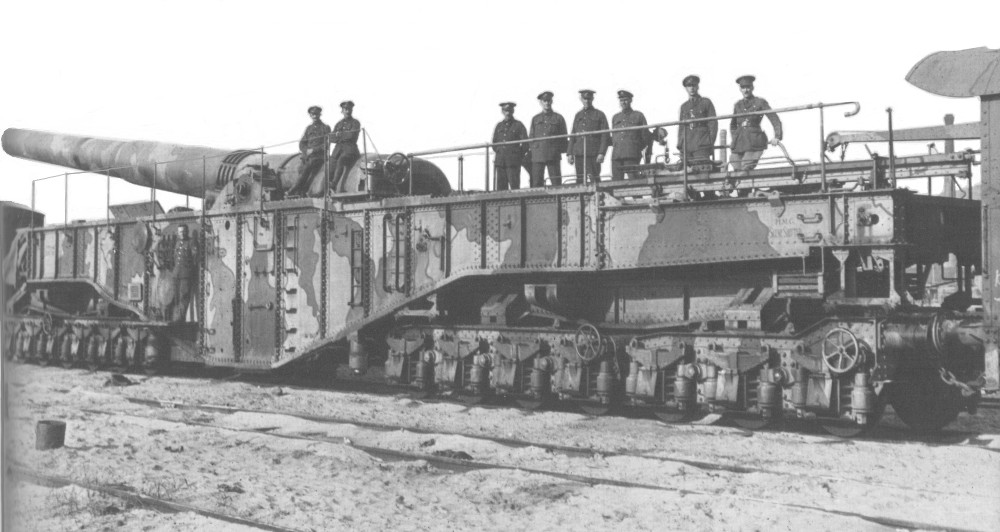
HM Gun Scene Shifter, a 14 inch railway gun, at Camiers, 8 km NW of Étaples, France, 1918.

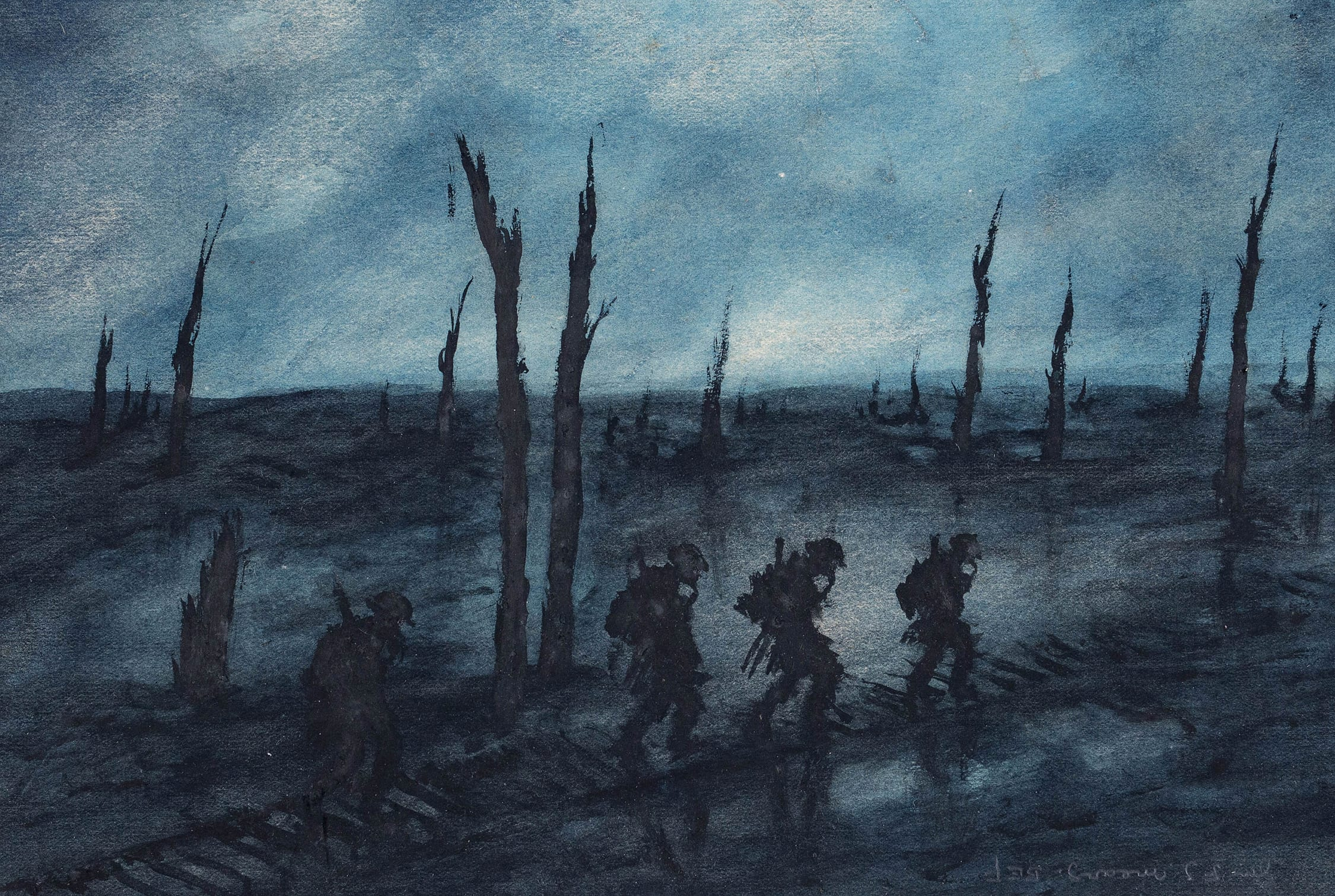
One of Gunner F. J. Mears' paintings of a WW1 battlefield at night

In 1914 the army possessed very little heavy artillery. As larger guns became more important, the RGA took responsibility for heavy and siege artillery in the field, as well as railway guns (and mountain artillery), as its training and experience were thought to be better suited to operating larger field guns and howitzers. The RGA also had a large body of Regular Army and Territorial Force personnel manning coastal batteries that for the most part were idle throughout war, and the coastal batteries were stripped to a bare minimum of manpower in order to re-assign personnel to the heavy batteries in the field, or to assist with the operation of ammunition dumps and the supply of ammunition to batteries in the field. The RGA grew into a very large component of the British Army, being armed with heavy, large-calibre guns and howitzers that were positioned some way behind the front line and had immense destructive power. With the new long-range small arms available to the infantry in the era before World War I, artillery fighting in the infantry line was increasingly vulnerable to small-arms fire. The solution to this was the principle of standing off and engaging the enemy with indirect fire. Henceforth the artillery would be positioned well behind the infantry battle line, firing at unseen targets, controlled by a forward artillery observer. Later in the war, advances in the science of gunnery enabled guns to be aimed at co-ordinates on a map calculated with geometry and mathematics. As the war developed, the heavy artillery and the techniques of long-range artillery were massively developed. The RGA was often supported by the Royal Flying Corps (RFC) who had devised a system where pilots could use wireless telegraphy to give corrections of aim to the guns. The RFC aircraft carried a wireless set and a map and after identifying the position of an enemy target the pilot was able to transmit messages such as A5, B3, etc. in Morse code to an RFC land station attached to a heavy artillery unit, such as Royal Garrison Artillery Siege Batteries.

The RGA significantly increased in size, especially the Heavy Batteries, which increased from 32 Regular and Territorial Force batteries in 1914 to 117 by the end of the war. The siege batteries increased from just three regular batteries in 1914 to 401 by the end of the war. Siege batteries (such as 9th Siege Battery at the Battle of the Somme) had the largest guns and howitzers; mounted on railways or on fixed concrete emplacements.

Gunner F. J. Mears, who was medically discharged in 1917, went on to become a successful artist, painting scenes from the battlefield.

== Re-amalgamation ==
After the war, the corps was re-organised so that it retained heavy field artillery and so that its fixed coastal batteries could be called upon to also operate in the field. The fixed coastal batteries were by then a small part of the corps, and the operation of heavy field artillery had been found to be more alike that of the field artillery. Maintaining the RGA as a separate corps consequently became unnecessary. The corps name was discontinued in 1924, when the RGA was re-amalgamated into the Royal Artillery and the RGA ceased to exist as a separate entity.

Coastal artillery was also among the victims of post-war cutbacks of the defence budget. In 1926, it was decided that fixed coastal batteries in the United Kingdom-proper would be manned entirely by Territorial Army Royal Artillery personnel (with small district establishments of Regular Army Royal Artillery as permanent staffs). At the same time, the Regular Army Royal Engineers Fortress Companies handed responsibility for the operation of the Defence Electric Lights (used to aid night firing at coastal batteries) to Territorial Royal Engineers units. This was generally the case in British colonies, also the Regular Army Royal Artillery and Royal Engineers companies were withdrawn from Sierra Leone and the Bermuda Garrison in 1928. In the same year the Bermuda Militia Artillery was re-organised on Territorial Army lines in order to take over complete responsibility (with the district establishment) for manning coastal artillery. The Bermuda Volunteer Engineers was raised in 1931 to take over the Defence Electric Lights). In the Far East, the growing threat of the Imperial Japanese Navy and Japan's military adventures in China meant that coastal artillery defences were increased, notably at Singapore where the Singapore Naval Base was constructed, and Regular Army coastal artillery units remained.

== See also ==
- List of Royal Artillery Divisions 1882–1902
