= Robert Dennison =

Robert Dennison may refer to:

- Robert Dennison (United States Navy officer) (1901–1980), American naval officer and aide to President Harry Truman
- Robert Dennison (politician) (1879–1951), British Member of Parliament for Birmingham King's Norton, 1924–1929
- Robert Denniston (1800–1867), NY State Comptroller, 1860–1861, sometimes quoted as Robert Dennison
- Robbie Dennison (born 1963), Northern Ireland international footballer
- Bob Dennison (footballer, born 1900) (1900–1973), English football forward of the 1920s
- Bob Dennison (footballer, born 1912) (1912–1996), English football centre half of the 1930s and manager of clubs including Middlesbrough
- Bob Dennison (footballer, born 1932) (1932–2017), English football full back of the 1950s
