= Horace Harvey (bowls) =

South African lawn bowler

Personal information
- Nationality: South Africa

Sport
- Club: Brakpan BC
Medal record
Representing South Africa
Commonwealth Games
Gold medal – first place	1938 Sydney	singles

Horace Harvey was a South African international lawn bowler.

== Bowls career ==
In 1938 he won the gold medal in the singles event at the 1938 British Empire Games.

He was a 1937 singles National Champion bowling for the Brakpan Bowls Club, Guateng.

== Personal life ==
His father was Andrew Harvey who competed in the 1934 British Empire Games and his son was Tommy Harvey, a winner of two medals at the 1972 World Outdoor Bowls Championship.
