= George Hiscock =

English bowls player

Personal information
- Nationality: British (English)
- Born: 2 November 1874; Kent, England
- Died: 22 September 1962 (aged 87); Kent, England
- Occupation(s): Relieving Officer, London County Council

Sport
- Sport: Lawn bowls

George Hiscock (1874–1962) was a bowls player from England who competed at the British Empire Games.

== Bowls career ==
In 1937 Hiscock was selected for a tour of New Zealand and Australia, which culminated in the Empire Games.

He represented England at the 1938 British Empire Games in Sydney, Australia, where he competed in the fours/rink event, finishing in fifth place.

== Personal life ==
He was a relieving officer for the London County Council by trade and lived in Fulham.
