= Alec Robertson (bowls) =

New Zealand bowls player

Alec Robertston
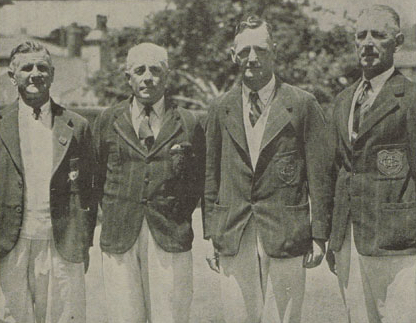
- Robertson (second from right), as a member of the Onehunga four that won the men's fours title at the 1940 New Zealand national lawn bowls championships

Personal information
- Born: Hugh Alexander Robertson; 20 October 1884
- Died: 12 September 1977 (aged 92)
- Occupation: Farmer
- Spouse: Norma Moore (m. 1924; died 1968)

Sport
- Country: New Zealand
- Sport: Lawn bowls
- Club: Onehunga Bowling Club

Achievements and titles
- National finals: Men's fours champion (1940, 1948)
Medal record
Men's lawn bowls
Representing New Zealand
Commonwealth Games
Gold medal – first place	1938 Sydney	Fours

Hugh Alexander Robertson (20 October 1884 – 12 September 1977) was a New Zealand lawn bowls player who won a gold medal in the men's fours at the 1938 British Empire Games. He also won two national lawn bowls titles.

== Biography ==
Born on 20 October 1884, Robertson was the son of Euphemia and David Scott Robertson. He was a member of a pioneer farming family in Māngere. In Onehunga on 28 October 1924, he married Norma Moore (née Moore), who had a son from a previous marriage.

At the 1938 British Empire Games in Sydney, Robertson was part of the New Zealand men's fours team that won the gold medal, along with Bill Bremner, Ernie Jury and Bill Whittaker.

A member of the Onehunga Bowling Club, Robertson won two New Zealand national bowls championship titles in the men's fours, in 1940 and 1948.

Robertson was a dairy farmer at Robertson Road, Māngere, supplying town milk, until retiring in 1942. He died on 12 September 1977, and his body was cremated at Purewa Crematorium, Auckland. He was predeceased by his wife, Norma, in 1968.
