= Edward Shuttle =

English bowls player

Personal information
- Nationality: British (English)
- Born: April 12, 1877 Reading, England
- Died: 1955 Reading, England
- Occupation: Employment exchange manager

Sport
- Sport: Lawn bowls

Edward Shuttle (1877-1955), was a bowls player from England who competed at the British Empire Games.

== Bowls career ==
In 1937 Shuttle was selected for a tour of New Zealand and Australia, which culminated in the Empire Games.

Shuttle represented England at the 1938 British Empire Games in Sydney, Australia, where he competed in the fours/rink event, finishing in fifth place.

== Personal life ==
He was an employment exchange manager at the Ministry of Labour by trade and lived at Castle Street in Reading.
