= Alexander Templeton =

Scottish lawn bowler (1874–1951)

Personal information
- Nationality: British (Scottish)
- Born: 28 July 1874 Kilmarnock, Scotland
- Died: 1 January 1951 (aged 76) Kilmarnock, Scotland

Sport
- Sport: Lawn bowls
- Club: Kilmarnock BC

Alexander Adamson Templeton (28 July 1874 – 1 January 1951) was a lawn bowler who competed for Scotland at the British Empire Games (now Commonwealth Games).

== Biography ==
Templeton was a member of the Kilmarnock Bowls Club and in January 1937 was selected by Scotland for the tour of the United States, which included a test match in St Petersburg, Orlando. His wife and daughter (both called Margaret) were also chosen for the tour.

Templeton was best known for representing the Scottish team in the pairs discipline with James McAlpine at the 1938 British Empire Games in Sydney, Australia. The pair finished fifth in the group standings, scoring one victory against their rivals England.

At the time of the 1938 Games, he was a retired grain merchant and living at 7 Dundonald Road, Kilmarnock. After the Games he represented Great Britain, participating in the tour to Florida from 28 January until 24 March 1939. The outbreak of World War II resulted in the end of his international bowls career.
