= James McAlpine (bowls) =

Scottish bowler

Personal information
- Nationality: British (Scottish)
- Born: c.1867 Scotland

Sport
- Sport: Lawn bowls
- Club: Cardonald BC, Glasgow

James B. McAlpine (c.1867 – date of death unknown) was a lawn bowler who competed for Scotland at the British Empire Games (now Commonwealth Games).

== Biography ==
McAlpine was a member of the Cardonald Bowls Club of Glasgow. In October 1937 he was selected by the Scottish team for the tour of Australia, which included the 1938 British Empire Games in Sydney, Australia.

McAlpine participated in the pairs discipline with Alexander Templeton and the pair scored one victory against their rivals England. However, they finished fifth in the group standings despite the victory over England.

At the time of the 1938 Games, he was a retired manufacturer and Draper and living at 33 Forfar Avenue in Glasgow.
