= Harvey Hutton =

Australian cricketer

Personal information
- Born: 10 August 1911; Adelaide, South Australia
- Died: 27 August 1965 (aged 54); Adelaide, South Australia
- Relatives: Percy Hutton (father); Maurice Hutton (brother); Mervyn Hutton (cousin)
- Source: Cricinfo, 9 August 2020

Harvey Hutton (10 August 1911 – 27 August 1965) was an Australian cricketer. He played in two first-class matches for South Australia in 1934/35.
