= Charlie McNeill (bowls) =

Australian lawn bowler

Personal information
- Nationality: Australia
- Born: June 7, 1888 Emigrant Creek, Richmond River, NSW
- Died: 12 September 1974 (aged 86) Waratah

Sport
- Sport: Lawn bowls
- Club: Hamilton BC, NSW
Medal record
Men's Lawn bowls
Representing Australia
Commonwealth Games
Bronze medal – third place	1938 Sydney	rinks (fours)

Charles Arthur Henry McNeill (1888–1974), was an Australian lawn bowls international who competed in the 1938 British Empire Games.

== Bowls career ==
He joined the Hamilton Bowls Club, New South Wales in 1919. He won 18 club singles titles from 1921–1964.

At the 1938 British Empire Games he won the bronze medal in the rinks (fours) event with Aub Murray, Harold Murray and Tom Kinder.

He was the 1938 Australian National Bowls Championships rinks (fours) champion when bowling with the Murrays and Kinder and the 1955 Singles champion. and was State champion in 1934 and 1951.

The fours team were known as the Big Four in Australia because they also won four state titles. In addition McNeill won four state pairs and three state singles titles.

== Personal life ==
He was the eldest of six children, his father Charles was a farmer and his mother was called Wilhelmina. He worked as a grocer at Ballina before becoming an insurance representative and married Una Beatrice Gould. In 1973 he was awarded the British Empire medal.

== Legacy ==
Hamilton BC named a green and a trophy after him in 1976 and 1993 respectively.
