= Aub Murray =

Australian lawn bowler

Personal information
- Nationality: Australia

Sport
- Sport: Lawn bowls
- Club: Hamilton BC, NSW
Medal record
Men's Lawn bowls
Representing Australia
Commonwealth Games
| Bronze medal – third place | 1938 Sydney | rinks (fours) |

Aubrey Murray was an Australian lawn bowls international who competed in the 1938 British Empire Games.

== Bowls career ==
He bowled for the Hamilton Bowls Club, New South Wales.

At the 1938 British Empire Games he won the bronze medal in the rinks (fours) event with Charlie McNeill, Harold Murray and Tom Kinder.

He was the 1938 Australian National Bowls Championships rinks (fours) winner when bowling with McNeill, Murray and Kinder.

The fours team were known as the Big Four in Australia because they also won four state titles.
