= Affie Jarvis =

Australian cricketer

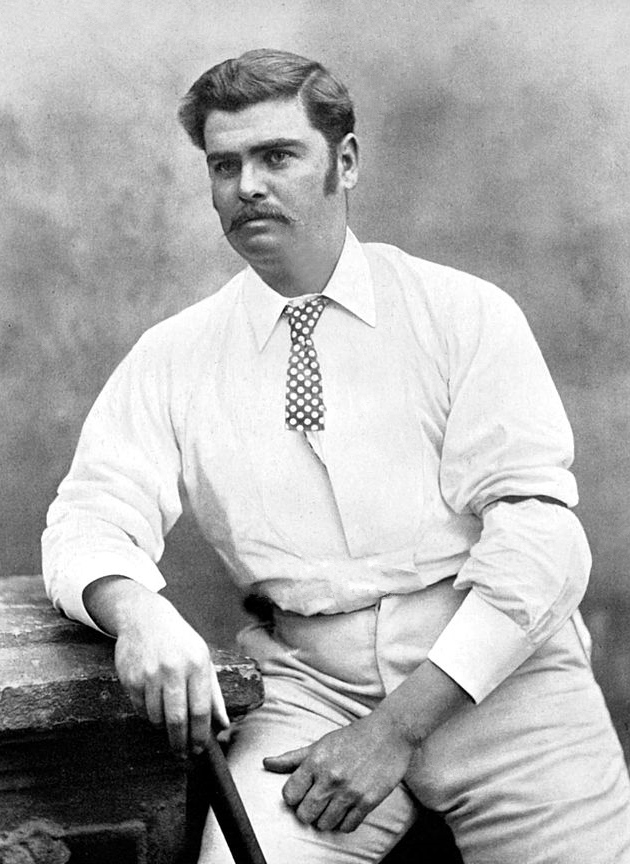

Personal information
- Full name: Arthur Harwood Jarvis
- Born: 19 October 1860; Hindmarsh, South Australia, Australia
- Died: 15 November 1933 (aged 73); Hindmarsh, South Australia, Australia
- Nickname: Affie
- Batting: Right-handed
- Role: Wicket-keeper
- Relatives: Fred Jarvis (brother); Harwood Jarvis (son)

International information
- National side: Australia
- Test debut (cap 33): 1 January 1885 v England
- Last Test: 1 March 1895 v England

Career statistics
Competition	Tests	First-class
Matches	11	141
Runs scored	303	3161
Batting average	16.83	15.57
100s/50s	0/1	0/13
Top score	82	98*
Balls bowled	0	100
Wickets	0	1
Bowling average	–	63.00
5 wickets in innings	0	0
10 wickets in match	0	0
Best bowling	–	1/9
Catches/stumpings	9/9	115/83
- Source: Cricinfo

Arthur Harwood "Affie" Jarvis (19 October 1860 – 15 November 1933) was an Australian wicket-keeper who played for Australia and South Australia. His Test cricket debut was against England at the MCG on 15 January 1885 and his last Test was also against England at the same ground on 1 March 1895.

Jarvis was unlucky in that his time clashed with that of Jack Blackham, who held down the wicket-keeping spot in the Australian Test team that Jarvis would probably otherwise have had. Nonetheless, Jarvis had a long and successful career as the wicket-keeper for South Australia, played 11 Tests for Australia, and toured England with the Australians in 1880, 1886, 1888 and 1893. When Blackham was injured and unable to play during the tour of New Zealand in 1886–87, Jarvis kept wicket. The New Zealand cricket historian Tom Reese wrote in 1927 that his keeping was "the chief feature of the tour ... absolutely brilliant throughout, and it is generally considered that the best wicket-keeping ever seen in New Zealand was displayed by Jarvis on this tour".

Jarvis appeared in South Australia's first first-class match in 1877-78 when he was 17, and their first Sheffield Shield match in 1892-93. His last first-class match was in 1900-01 when he was 40. His South Australian teammate George Giffen praised Jarvis's ability as a wicket-keeper, pointing out that after years of keeping in the flimsy gloves of the era, Jarvis's hands had "not a single unsound finger", unlike many wicket-keepers then and now.

Jarvis died in hospital in Adelaide after a long illness, aged 73.

== See also ==
- List of Australian Test wicket-keepers
