= Harold Murray (bowls) =

Australian lawn bowler

Personal information
- Nationality: Australia

Sport
- Sport: Lawn bowls
- Club: Hamilton BC, NSW
Medal record
Men's Lawn bowls
Representing Australia
Commonwealth Games
Bronze medal – third place	1938 Sydney	rinks (fours)

Harold Frank Murray was an Australian lawn bowls international who competed in the 1938 British Empire Games.

== Bowls career ==
He bowled for the Hamilton Bowls Club, New South Wales.

At the 1938 British Empire Games he won the bronze medal in the rinks (fours) event with Aub Murray, Charlie McNeill and Tom Kinder.

He was the 1938 Australian National Bowls Championships rinks (fours) winner when bowling with McNeill, Murray and Kinder. In addition Harold Murray won the 1934 national rinks title.

The fours team were known as the Big Four in Australia because they also won four state titles.
