= Jack Low =

Australian lawn bowler

Personal information
- Nationality: Australia

Sport
- Sport: Lawn bowls
- Club: Lithgow BC; Belmont BC
Medal record
Men's Lawn bowls
Representing Australia
Commonwealth Games
Bronze medal – third place	1938 Sydney	singles

Jack Low was an Australian lawn bowls international who competed in the 1938 British Empire Games.

== Bowls career ==
At the 1938 British Empire Games he won the bronze medal in the singles event.

He was the 1938 National singles runner-up when bowling for the Belmont Bowls Club in New South Wales. He previously bowled for the Lithgow Bowls Club.
