= James Cuthbert =

Personal information
- Nationality: British (English/Scottish)
- Born: July 29, 1875; Ardoch, Perthshire, Scotland
- Died: 1959; Willesden, England
- Occupation: Public works park contractor

Sport
- Sport: Lawn bowls

James Gibson Cuthbert (1875-1959), was a Scottish born bowls player who competed at the British Empire Games for England.

== Bowls career ==
In 1937 Cuthbert was selected for a tour of New Zealand and Australia, which culminated in the Empire Games.

He represented England at the 1938 British Empire Games in Sydney, Australia, where he competed in the fours/rink event, finishing in fifth place.

== Personal life ==
He was a member of the Institution of Civil Engineers and a public works park contractor by trade and lived at 10 Lonsdale Avenue and later 33 Park Lane, Wembley.
