= Frank Meares =

Australian sportsman (1873–1952)

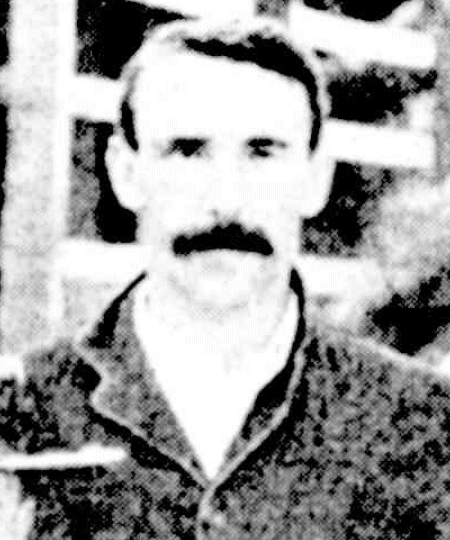

Personal information
- Full name: Frank Devenish Meares
- Born: 25 April 1873; Surry Hills, New South Wales
- Died: 4 July 1952 (aged 79); Sydney, New South Wales
- Role: Batsman
- Relatives: William Meares (father)

Domestic team information
- Years: Team
- 1898/99: Western Australia
- 1901/02: New South Wales

Career statistics
| Competition | First-class |
|---|---|
| Matches | 3 |
| Runs scored | 101 |
| Batting average | 16.83 |
| 100s/50s | 0/1 |
| Top score | 55 |
| Balls bowled | 30 |
| Wickets | 0 |
| Bowling average | – |
| 5 wickets in innings | – |
| 10 wickets in match | – |
| Best bowling | – |
| Catches/stumpings | 2/– |
- Source: CricketArchive, 11 December 2012

Frank Devenish Meares (25 April 1873 – 4 July 1952), also Frank Devenish-Meares (hyphenated), was an Australian sportsman who played both cricket and Australian rules football at high levels.

Born in Surry Hills, an inner-city suburb of Sydney, New South Wales, Meares was the son of William Meares, a manager in the insurance industry who played two first-class matches in New Zealand for Otago during the 1870s. Frank Meares emigrated to Western Australia sometime in the late 1890s, and took up playing with East Fremantle in the Perth district cricket competition, leading the club's batting averages during the 1897–98 season. When the club was reformed the following season under the electorate system (recruitment limited to specific localities), Meares was made one of the club's inaugural delegates to the Western Australian Cricket Association (WACA). He was consistently regarded as one of the club's best batsmen, and in one match during the 1898–99 season scored 110 runs from a team total of 170 runs, an innings which led The Inquirer & Commercial News to describe him as the "most artistic batsman in the colony" and his innings as "one of the best displays of the game that has been witnessed this season".

Meares' form led to his selection for Western Australia to play against the touring South Australia in April 1899. In the match, held at the WACA Ground over four days, he scored 16 runs in both innings, batting at first drop, and was dismissed by Joe Travers and Alfred Jarvis in the first and second innings, respectively. During 1899, Meares also began to play football for the East Fremantle Football Club in the West Australian Football League (WAFL), with The West Australian noting his marking ability. At the start of the following cricket season, he was made East Fremantle's captain. However, in November 1899, shortly after the season commenced, Meares returned to New South Wales for unexplained reasons. The West Australian remarked that he was "undoubtedly the most brilliant batsman in the colony", and that Western Australian cricket would "suffer greatly" as a result of his departure. Meares continued playing cricket in New South Wales, turning out for the Leichhardt–Balmain District Cricket Club in Sydney grade cricket, and also later for the Gordon District Cricket Club. He went on to play two first-class matches for New South Wales during the 1901–02 season—a Sheffield Shield match against Victoria and an interstate match against Queensland. In the first of these matches, against Victoria, he recorded his highest first-class score (and only half-century), an innings of 55 runs. Meares died in Sydney in July 1952.
