= David Dennison (cricketer) =

Irish cricketer

Cricket information
- Batting: Right-handed

Career statistics
Competition	First-class	List A
Matches	2	3
Runs scored	17	17
Batting average	8.00	5.66
100s/50s	0/0	0/0
Top score	16	12
Catches/stumpings	1/–	0/–
- Source: CricketArchive, 30 December 2021

David George Dennison (born 22 December 1961) is a former Irish cricketer. A right-handed batsman, he made his debut for the Ireland cricket team against Scotland in July 1983 in a first-class match. He went on to play for Ireland on 24 occasions, his last match coming against the MCC at Lord's in August 1987.

Of his matches for Ireland, two were first-class matches against Scotland and three were List A matches played as part of the NatWest Trophy. In all matches for Ireland, he scored 650 runs at an average of 28.26. He scored one century, against Zimbabwean club side Stragglers on Ireland's tour of Zimbabwe in January 1986. That match was also the only time he bowled for Ireland, bowling seven balls and conceding eleven runs.
