= Francis Napier Denison =

Canadian weather forecaster

- Born: 19 April 1866; Toronto, Ontario, Canada
- Died: 24 June 1946 (aged 80); Victoria, British Columbia
- Resting place: Royal Oak Burial Park Cemetery, Victoria
- Other name: "Our weatherman"
- Known for: Inventing the hydro-aerograph
- Spouse: Ethel Margaret Walbran (m. 1904)
- Children: None
- Scientific career
- Fields: Meteorology, seismology, astronomy
- Workplaces: Meteorological Service of Canada

Francis "Frank" Napier Denison (cited as F. Napier Denison, 19 April 1866 – 24 June 1946) was a Canadian meteorologist, inventor, seismologist, and astronomer. In the early 20th century he was known to thousands of Victoria's inhabitants as "our weatherman". His most noteworthy invention is perhaps the hydro-aerograph.

== Biography ==
=== Formation and first assignment ===
After graduation from Upper Canada College, he became in 1882 a member of Canada's Dominion Meteorological Service (now Meteorological Service of Canada) and was appointed in 1884 an assistant observer at the Toronto Magnetic and Meteorological Observatory. After he completed two years of education in Boston and Lynn, Massachusetts, the Dominion Meteorological Service transferred him in 1898 to Victoria as weather observer and forecaster. He worked with E. Baynes Reed at the weather observing station located on Government Street in Victoria Harbour's Inner Harbour.

Reed, the senior scientist, and Denison were the coauthors of Victoria's first official weather report. The Daily Colonist published the report on 1 November 1898. In the spring of 1899 the two meteorologists began to issue marine warnings. Eventually, the weather forecasts were issued by wireless telegraphy to ships in the Pacific, and the ships returned information about the weather conditions encountered at sea.

At the 1911 meeting of the British Association in Portsmouth, Denison presented evidence gathered over 11 years from 1899 to 1910 in Victoria, B.C. His observations of changes in level of a horizontal pendulum demonstrated a correlation between the pendulum's wanderings and the annual frequency of exceptionally strong earthquakes.

=== Victoria's Observatory ===
Denison petitioned Canada's federal government to build an observatory on Victoria Harbour's Gonzales Hill, where a radio-telegraph station existed at the time of the petition. Gonzalez Hill has the highest elevation on the southern coast of Vancouver Island. Working for the Canada Department of Public Works, the architect William Henderson, in consultation with Denison, designed the new station to provide seismological and astronomical services for western Canada. For use in the dome on the structure, Denison acquired a 5-inch equatorial telescope and made it available for supervised use by the public. In April 1914, the government officially opened the new station. When E. Baynes Reed died in 1916, Denison was appointed director of meteorological services for British Columbia and the Yukon Territory. For a few years, the Gonzales Hill Observatory was the primary source of scientifically accurate time west of the Canadian Rockies.

Denison’s observatory became far less important due to the 1918 completion of Saanich's Dominion Astrophysical Observatory, which at the time of its 1918 opening housed the largest telescope in the world. However, Denison continued steadily working at his station and did not take a holiday in over 20 years. During his career, the station was rated as western Canada's best weather office. During his career in Victoria, Denison became one of the best-known meteorologists in North America. He retired in 1936 with great public honour.

=== Inventions ===
The Canadian Patent Office granted him patents for an electric brake, an electric dental motor apparatus a seismograph for use in mine safety, and a device to remove dust from hospital cabinets. The dust remover was used by many hospitals.

=== Private life ===
In July 1904 Denison married Ethel Margaret Walbran, whose father was Captain John Thomas Walbran (1848–1913). Soon after the Gonzalez Hill Observatory opened in 1914, the Denisons moved into its simple living quarters, where they lived into the 1930s. There were no children from their marriage. The two are buried side by side in the Royal Oak Burial Park Cemetery in Victoria.

== Awards and recognition ==
Denison was a fellow of the Royal Astronomical Society of Canada. He was elected in 1915 a fellow of the American Association for the Advancement of Science.

Denison Road at Victoria's Gonzalez Hill Observatory is named in his honour. Denison Island, located at the entrance to Boswell Inlet about 11 kilometers (7 miles) from Boswell, British Columbia, is named in honour of F. Napier Denison. The island was named in 1903 by the Geographic Board of Canada.

== Selected publications ==
- Denison, Napier (May 1897). "The Great Lakes as a Sensitive Barometer". Proceedings of the Canadian Institute. New Series. 1, Part 1 (2). Canadian Institute.: 55–63.
- Denison, F. Napier (October 1901). "The seismograph as a sensitive barometer". Quarterly Journal of the Royal Meteorological Society. 27 (120): 293–300. doi:10.1002/qj.49702712005. online text
- —— (1908). "The Effect of Atmospheric Pressure upon the Earth's Surface". Journal of the Royal Astronomical Society of Canada. 2: 293–298.
- ——. Victoria, "the city of sunshine", capital of British Columbia and its 2 observatories. Victoria, B.C.: Victoria & Island Development Association. ISBN 0665993242. 6 pages, published circa 1918?
- —— (1919). "The British Columbia earthquake of December 6, 1918". Bulletin of the Seismological Society of America. 9 (1): 20–23. Bibcode:1919BuSSA...9...20D. doi:10.1785/BSSA0090010020. S2CID 131065685.
- —— (1925). "The Climate of British Columbia". Monthly Weather Review. 53 (8): 354. Bibcode:1925MWRv...53..354D. doi:10.1175/1520-0493(1925)53<354a:TCOBC>2.0.CO;2. online text, archive.org
- —— (1929). "Long Range Weather Forecasts". Journal of the Royal Astronomical Society of Canada. 23: 458.
- —— (1932). "The Remarkably Heavy Precipitation at Henderson Lake, Vancouver Island, British Columbia". Monthly Weather Review. 60 (12): 252. Bibcode:1932MWRv...60..252D. doi:10.1175/1520-0493(1932)60<252a:TRHPAH>2.0.CO;2.
- —— (1938). "Notes on horizontal-pendulum observations in relation to certain phenomena". Transactions, American Geophysical Union. 19 (1): 210. Bibcode:1938TrAGU..19..210D. doi:10.1029/TR019i001p00210.
- —— (1938). "The horizontal pendulum in relation to certain phenomena". Bulletin of the Seismological Society of America. 28 (1): 39–44. Bibcode:1938BuSSA..28...39D. doi:10.1785/BSSA0280010039. (follow-up to 1913 paper)
- —— (1940). "Further notes on certain horizontal pendulum movements". Bulletin of the Seismological Society of America. 30 (3): 219–224. Bibcode:1940BuSSA..30..219D. doi:10.1785/BSSA0300030219.
- —— (1941). "A Report on the Difference Between the Precipitation Records as Taken on the Standard Canadian and United States Rain-gauges". Bulletin of the American Meteorological Society. 22 (2): 65–67. Bibcode:1941BAMS...22...65D. doi:10.1175/1520-0477-22.2.65. S2CID 125790504.
