= Walter Denison =

New Zealand bowls player

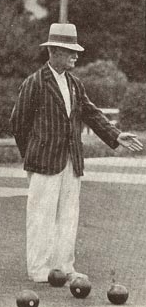
- Denison in 1939

Personal information
- Born: 10 November 1870 Auckland, New Zealand
- Died: 2 October 1954 (aged 83) Auckland, New Zealand
- Spouse: Frances Mitcham (m. 1896)
- Relative: Oswald Denison (son)

Sport
- Country: New Zealand
- Sport: Lawn bowls
- Club: Balmoral Bowling Club, Auckland
Medal record
Representing New Zealand
Men's lawn bowls
British Empire Games
Gold medal – first place	1938 Sydney	Pairs

Walter Denison (10 November 1870 – 2 October 1954) was a New Zealand lawn bowls player who won a gold medal in the men's pair at the 1938 British Empire Games.

== Early life ==
Born in Auckland on 10 November 1870, Denison was the son of Mary and William Denison. As a young man, he was active as a swimmer, rower, wrestler and boxer, and in later life he was a timekeeper for the Auckland Wrestling Association for 20 years.

On 14 October 1896, Denison married Frances Mitcham, and the couple had eight children.

== Career ==
A member of the Balmoral Bowling Club in Auckland, Denison served as the club president from 1925 to 1926. He represented New Zealand in the men's pairs at the 1938 British Empire Games in Sydney, winning the gold medal alongside Lance Macey. At the same games, Denison's son, Oswald, won a bronze medal representing New Zealand in the men's rowing eight.

Outside of bowls, Denison was a jeweller. With William Brackenbury Kirkman, he founded the retail and manufacturing firm of Kirkman and Denison Jewellers in the 1890s, and he continued the business by himself after Kirkman's retirement. He served as vice-commodore of the Waitemata Boating Club and the Manukau Cruising Club at various times.

Denison died in Auckland on 2 October 1954, and was survived by his wife. His ashes were buried at Waikumete Cemetery.
