= Ray Mears (disambiguation) =

Ray Mears is a British author and TV presenter, on survival and bushcraft.

Ray Mears may also refer to:

- Ray Mears (basketball) (1926–2007), University of Tennessee basketball coach
- Ray Mears (footballer), New Zealand international football (soccer) player
