= Bob Dennison (footballer, born 1932) =

English footballer

Personal information
- Full name: Charles Robert Dennison
- Date of birth: 12 September 1932
- Place of birth: Hull, England
- Date of death: 9 July 2017 (aged 84)
- Place of death: Hull, England
- Position: Right back

Youth career
- Hull City

Senior career*
Years	Team	Apps	(Gls)
1954–1958	Hull City	24	(1)
1958–19??	Scarborough		
- * Club domestic league appearances and goals

Charles Robert Dennison (12 September 1932 – 9 July 2017) was an English professional footballer who made 24 appearances in the Football League playing as a right back for Hull City. He also played non-league football for Scarborough of the Midland League.
