= Christabel Dennison =

English painter (1884-1924)

Christabel Denniston
- Born: 1884; Watford
- Died: 1924 (aged 39–40)
- Known for: Painting, drawing

Christabel Dennison (1884-1924) was a British artist, known for her paintings and sculptures.

== Biography ==
Dennison was born in Watford and studied at Hubert von Herkomer's art school at Bushey in Hertfordshire. In 1905 she visited Paris and shortly later began exhibiting works in London, and, from 1910, with the International Society of Sculptors, Painters and Gravers. She was active in the newly established Allied Artists Association and in 1910 she served on the Association's hanging committee alongside Jacob Epstein and Charles Ginner. A sculpture, Wind, was exhibited at the Grosvenor Gallery in 1915 and was well reviewed.

During World War I, Dennison served as a nurse but after the war struggled financially, although she continued to paint and sometimes model for other artists. In 1925 a bout of measles followed by pneumonia led to her premature death. A memorial exhibition of her work, with a catalogue written by Ginner, was held at the Whitechapel Art Gallery in London during 1928.
