= Mark R. Denison =

Pediatrician

Mark R. Denison (born May 13, 1955) is the Stahlman Professor of Pediatrics, Pathology, Microbiology & Immunology and director of the Division of Pediatric Infectious Diseases at Vanderbilt University Medical Center. Denison has been researching the replication, pathogenesis and evolution of coronaviruses for over 30 years, and has published his research on SARS-CoV, MERS-CoV, and the current SARS-CoV-2.

== Education and career ==
Denison obtained a B.A. in Chemistry and English in 1977 from the University of Kansas and an M.D. in 1980 from the University of Kansas School of Medicine.

Denison led the team that developed the remdesivir drug to treat COVID-19.

In 2011 he was elected a Fellow of the American Association for the Advancement of Science.
