= Bill Whittaker (bowls) =

New Zealand bowls player

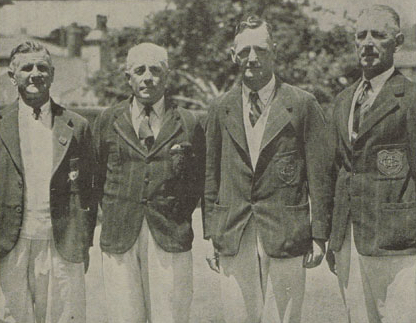
- Whittaker (left), as a member of the Onehunga four that won the men's fours title at the 1940 New Zealand national lawn bowls championships

Personal information
- Born: William Whittaker; 26 December 1883 Atherton, Lancashire, England
- Died: 13 August 1980 (aged 96) Auckland, New Zealand
- Occupation: Builder
- Spouse: Elizabeth Caldwell (m. 1907; died 1977)

Sport
- Country: New Zealand
- Sport: Lawn bowls
- Club: Onehunga Bowling Club

Achievements and titles
- National finals: Men's fours champion (1940)
Medal record
Men's lawn bowls
Representing New Zealand
Commonwealth Games
Gold medal – first place	1938 Sydney	Fours

William Whittaker (26 December 1883 – 13 August 1980) was a New Zealand lawn bowls player.

== Bowls career ==
At the 1938 Commonwealth Games in Sydney he was part of the men's fours team that won the gold medal; with Bill Bremner, Ernie Jury and Alec Robertson.

He won the 1940 fours title at the New Zealand National Bowls Championships when bowling for the Onehunga Bowls Club.
