= Ronald Weeks =

Personal information
- Nationality: British (English)
- Born: 11 May 1884 Winscombe, Somerset, England
- Died: 30 March 1973 (aged 88) Wells, Somerset, England
- Occupation: Farmer

Sport
- Sport: Lawn bowls

Ronald Weeks (11 May 1884 – 30 March 1973) was a bowls player from England who competed at the British Empire Games.

== Bowls career ==
Weeks represented England at the 1938 British Empire Games in Sydney, Australia, where he competed in the pairs event, finishing in fourth place.

He was honorary secretary of the Winscombe Bowls Club and his brother Hubert was the captain of the same club.

== Personal life ==
He was a farmer by trade and married Nora Kate Ralls, they lived at the Knapps in Winscombe, Somerset.
