= Leopole Hanson =

Australian cricketer (1883–1952)

Leopold Hanson
Personal information
- Born: 27 September 1883; Woodville, South Australia
- Died: 27 April 1952 (aged 68); Kingscote, South Australia
- Source: Cricinfo, 6 August 2020

Leopold Hanson (27 September 1883 – 27 April 1952) was an Australian cricketer. He played in three first-class matches for South Australia in 1905/06.

== See also ==
- List of South Australian representative cricketers
