= Lance Macey =

New Zealand bowls player

Personal information
- Born: Leslie Lancelot Macey; 4 August 1881 Blenheim, New Zealand
- Died: 28 September 1950 (aged 69) Auckland, New Zealand
- Spouse: Brenda Smith (m. 1906)

Sport
- Country: New Zealand
- Sport: Lawn bowls
- Club: Remuera
Medal record
Men's lawn bowls
Representing New Zealand
Commonwealth Games
Gold medal – first place	1938 Sydney	Pairs

Leslie Lancelot Macey (4 August 1881 – 28 September 1950) was a New Zealand lawn bowls player who won a gold medal at the 1938 British Empire Games.

== Early life and family ==
Born in Blenheim on 4 August 1881, Macey was the son of Henrietta Macey (née Simson) and William Henry Macey, a photographer who later served as mayor of Blenheim between 1903 and 1904. Lance Macey married Brenda Smith at St Paul's Church, Auckland on 14 November 1906, and the couple went on to have two children.

== Public service career ==
Macey joined the Post and Telegraph Department in 1897, beginning as a telegraph messenger in Blenheim. He rose through the ranks, becoming district telegraph engineer for Otago, based in Dunedin, in 1925, and Auckland district telegraph engineer in 1932. He was associated with the introduction of automatic telephone exchanges, and retired after 40 years' service in 1937.

In 1935, Macey was awarded the King George V Silver Jubilee Medal.

During World War II, Macey was recalled to work as a telegraph engineer, and he was commissioned as a captain in the Lines of Communication Signals (Post and Telegraph) in 1941.

== Bowls ==
At the 1938 British Empire Games in Sydney, Macey won the men's pairs gold medal alongside Walter Denison. In Auckland, he was a member of the Remuera Bowling Club, and served in various capacities, including as the club's president, treasurer, and secretary.

== Death ==
Macey died in Auckland on 28 September 1950, and his body was cremated at Waikumete Crematorium.
