= Stan Devenish Meares =

Australian obstetrician and gynaecologist

Stan Devenish Meares CBE
- Born: 14 July 1906; Summer Hill, New South Wales
- Died: 16 August 1994 (aged 88); Avoca, New South Wales
- Education: Newington College; University of Sydney
- Occupations: Obstetrician and Gynaecologist
- Spouse(s): Mary, née Muir (1939)
- Children: One daughter, three sons
- Parent: C E Devenish Meares

Stanley Devenish Meares CBE (14 July 1906 – 16 August 1994) was an Australian obstetrician and gynaecologist.

== Early life ==
Devenish Meares was born at Summer Hill, New South Wales, the son of C E Devenish Meares from his first marriage. His half brother was The Honourable Leycester Meares AC CMG QC, a judge of the Supreme Court of New South Wales. Meares attended Newington College (1919–1924) and went up to the University of Sydney in 1925, graduating as a Bachelor of Medicine and Surgery with first-class honours in 1932.

== Medical career ==
Meares served on the staff of the Royal Prince Alfred Hospital and Royal North Shore Hospital before going to the United Kingdom to gain gynaecological experience at Saint Mary's Hospital, Manchester. On his return to Australia, he was appointed an Honorary at the Crown Street Women's Hospital, Sydney. In 1946, after active service, he was appointed as an Honorary at Sydney Hospital. From that time, he was a clinical lecturer at the University of Sydney and in 1954 was appointed Consultant Gynaecologist to The Cancer Council New South Wales. In 1967 the Vth World Congress of Obstetrics and Gynaecology was held in Sydney and Meares was president of the meeting. In the same year he was elected President of the Australian Council of the Royal College of Obstetricians and Gynaecologists and held that position until 1970.

== War service ==
During World War II, Meares attained the rank of lieutenant colonel, serving as commanding officer of the 7th Field Ambulance, and was mentioned in dispatches.

== Honours ==
- Commander of the Order of the British Empire – 1968 for service to medicine

== Fellowships ==
- Royal College of Surgeons of Edinburgh
- Royal College of Obstetricians and Gynaecologists
- Royal Australasian College of Surgeons
- On the formation of the Royal Australian College of Obstetricians and Gynaecologists in 1983 he was made a Foundation Fellow.
