= William Dennison =

William Dennison or Denison may refer to:

- William Dennison (academic), 18th-century master of University College, Oxford
- William Dennison Jr. (1815–1882), American politician, governor of Ohio and U.S. Postmaster General
- William Dennison (Canadian politician) (1905–1981), mayor of Toronto, Member of Provincial Parliament
- William Neil Dennison (1841–1904), American Civil War artillery officer
- William Denison (1804–1871), British colonial official, governor of New South Wales, 1855–1861, and governor of Madras, 1861–1866
- William Denison, 1st Earl of Londesborough (1834–1900), British peer and Liberal politician
- William Denison (cricketer) (1801–1856), English cricketer and cricket official
- William Clark Denison, American mycologist
- William Evelyn Denison (1843–1916), British member of parliament for Nottingham, 1874–1880
- William Kendall Denison (1869–?), American classicist, and educator
- William S. Denison (1794–1880), Baptist farmer; benefactor and namesake of Denison University in Ohio
- William Joseph Denison (1770–1849), English banker and politician
- William Beckett-Denison (1826–1890), English banker and Conservative politician
- Doug Dennison (William Douglas Dennison, born 1951), American football player
- Paymaster Dennison (1954–before 2007), Motswana footballer

== See also ==
- William Dennison Cary (1808–?), founder of Cary, Illinois
