= Tom Dennison =

Tom Dennison may refer to:

- Tom Dennison (political boss) (1859–1934), political boss in Omaha, Nebraska in the early 1900s
- Tom Dennison (One Life to Live), character from the soap opera One Life to Live
