= Oswald Denison =

New Zealand rower

Personal information
- Born: Oswald William Denison; 29 June 1905 Auckland, New Zealand
- Died: 15 November 1990 (aged 85) Houhora, New Zealand
- Weight: 76 kg (168 lb)
- Spouse: Nellie Bristow (m. 1932; died 1987)
- Relative: Walter Denison (father)

Sport
- Sport: Rowing
- Club: Waitemata Rowing Club
Medal record
Representing New Zealand
Men's rowing
British Empire Games
Bronze medal – third place	1938 Sydney	Eight

Oswald William Denison (29 June 1905 – 15 November 1990) was a New Zealand rower who won a bronze medal at the 1938 British Empire Games.

== Early life and family ==
Born in the Auckland suburb of Ponsonby on 29 June 1905, Denison was the son of Walter Denison, a jeweller, and his wife Frances Denison (née Mitcham). He married Nellie Bristow on 5 October 1932 at the Grange Road Baptist Church in Mount Eden, and they went on to have five children.

== Rowing ==
A member of the Waitemata Rowing Club, Denison was the stroke of the Auckland eight that finished third at the interprovincial eights championship in March 1937.

In May 1937, Denison was named as an emergency for the rowing squad to represent New Zealand at the 1938 British Empire Games, but was later confirmed as a member of the New Zealand eight. At the games, he rowed in the two seat, and won a bronze medal, with the New Zealand eight finishing in third, two lengths behind the second-placed Australian crew.

Competing at the same games, his father, Walter Denison, won a gold medal for New Zealand in lawn bowls men's pairs.

== Later life and death ==
Denison died on 15 November 1990 at Houhora, and his ashes were buried at North Shore Memorial Park, Auckland. He had been predeceased by his wife in 1987.
