= Edward Tappenden =

English bowls player (1876-1944)

Personal information
- Nationality: British (English)
- Born: April 18, 1876; Marylebone, England
- Died: May 23, 1944; Hitchin, England
- Occupation: Private secretary

Sport
- Sport: Lawn bowls

Edward Tappenden (1876–1944), was a bowls player from England who competed at the British Empire Games.

== Bowls career ==
In 1937 Tappenden was selected for a tour of New Zealand and Australia, which culminated in the Empire Games.

He represented England at the 1938 British Empire Games in Sydney, Australia, where he competed in the fours/rink event, finishing in fifth place.

== Personal life ==
He was a private secretary by trade and lived in Wood Green, after marrying Violet Milne, they lived at The Avenue in Hitchin.
