= Percy Hutton =

Australian cricketer

Personal information
- Full name: William Frederick Percy Hutton
- Born: 2 October 1876; Mintaro, South Australia
- Died: 1 October 1951 (aged 74); Millswood, South Australia
- Role: Wicket-keeper
- Relatives: Maurice Hutton (son); Harvey Hutton (son); Mervyn Hutton (nephew)

Domestic team information
- Years: Team
- 1905/06: South Australia

Career statistics
Competition	First-class
Matches	1
Runs scored	30
Batting average	30.00
100s/50s	0/0
Top score	22*
Catches/stumpings	0/0
- Source: CricketArchive, 20 January 2014

William Frederick Percy Hutton (2 October 1876 – 1 October 1951), known as Percy Hutton, was an Australian cricketer who played a single first-class match for South Australia during the 1905–06 Sheffield Shield season. A wicket-keeper, he was only to keep wicket for a small portion of the game, after being injured early. Later in life, Hutton also won golf and lawn bowls tournaments, including some national events in the latter sport. Outside of sports, he was prominent in South Australian agricultural circles, holding a position with the Australian Wheat Board. He was also a councillor for the City of Unley.

== Career ==
Born in Mintaro, in the Clare Valley of South Australia, Hutton attended state school in Naracoorte, leaving at the age of 14 to work at a flour mill. A wicket-keeper who played for Sturt at district level, his only first-class cricket match came against New South Wales in December 1905, played over three days at the Adelaide Oval. Hutton scored 22 not out batting ninth in South Australia's first innings, which included a 34-run last-wicket partnership with Leopole Hanson. While keeping wicket in New South Wales' first innings, he was hit by a fast ball from Hanson and had to leave the field, with his replacement, the Test batsman Algy Gehrs, effecting a stumping later in the innings. Hutton recorded eight runs in South Australia's second innings total of 115 all out, with the team losing the match by an innings and 82 runs.

Hutton was one of three wicket-keepers South Australia used during the season's four matches, none of whom played again at state level (the others were Phil Newland and Harwood Jarvis). Later in life, he won local golf, billiards, and lawn bowls tournaments, partnering with his son Glen on occasion. With fellow bowls player Howard Mildren, he won the men's pairs event at the 1938 Australian Championships, held in Sydney. Hutton later worked as a wheat salesman and grainbroker, and was also active in local government, sitting on the City of Unley council from 1932 to 1939. In this capacity, he proposed the construction of a new A£10,000 town hall for Unley, which did not eventuate after meeting strong criticism from another councillor. After retiring from the council he served as superintendent of the newly established Australian Wheat Board in South Australia.

Hutton died at his residence in Millswood in October 1951. Several other members of his family were noted for their sporting achievements—two of his sons, Maurice and Harvey, and his nephew, Mervyn Hutton, each played cricket at state level during the 1930s. Maurice and Harvey also represented South Australia at football and baseball, respectively, while his other sons, Glen (golf and bowls) and Clarence (cycling and shooting), were also noted for their sporting prowess. Percy Hutton was predeceased by two of his sons—Maurice died suddenly aged 37, in February 1940, and Clarence was killed in Palestine on active service in April 1941. Another Hutton who played for South Australia during the 1905–06 season, the New Zealand-born Henry Hutton, was apparently unrelated.
