= F. J. Mears =

British soldier of WWI, artist

- Born: 1890
- Died: 1929 (aged 38–39)
- Occupation: Painter, soldier (–1917), metalworker
- Rank: gunner

Gunner F. J. Mears (1890–1929) was a British soldier of World War I, and subsequently a successful artist, painting war scenes, before his early death.

== Early life and military career ==
Mears was born in 1890. Details of his life, including his full name, are scant.

Originally a skilled metal worker, he served during World War I with the rank of gunner in the Royal Garrison Artillery, as part of the British Expeditionary Force. He saw action at the Somme and the Ypres Salient, and was medically discharged in 1917, after being subjected to a poison gas attack.

== Art ==
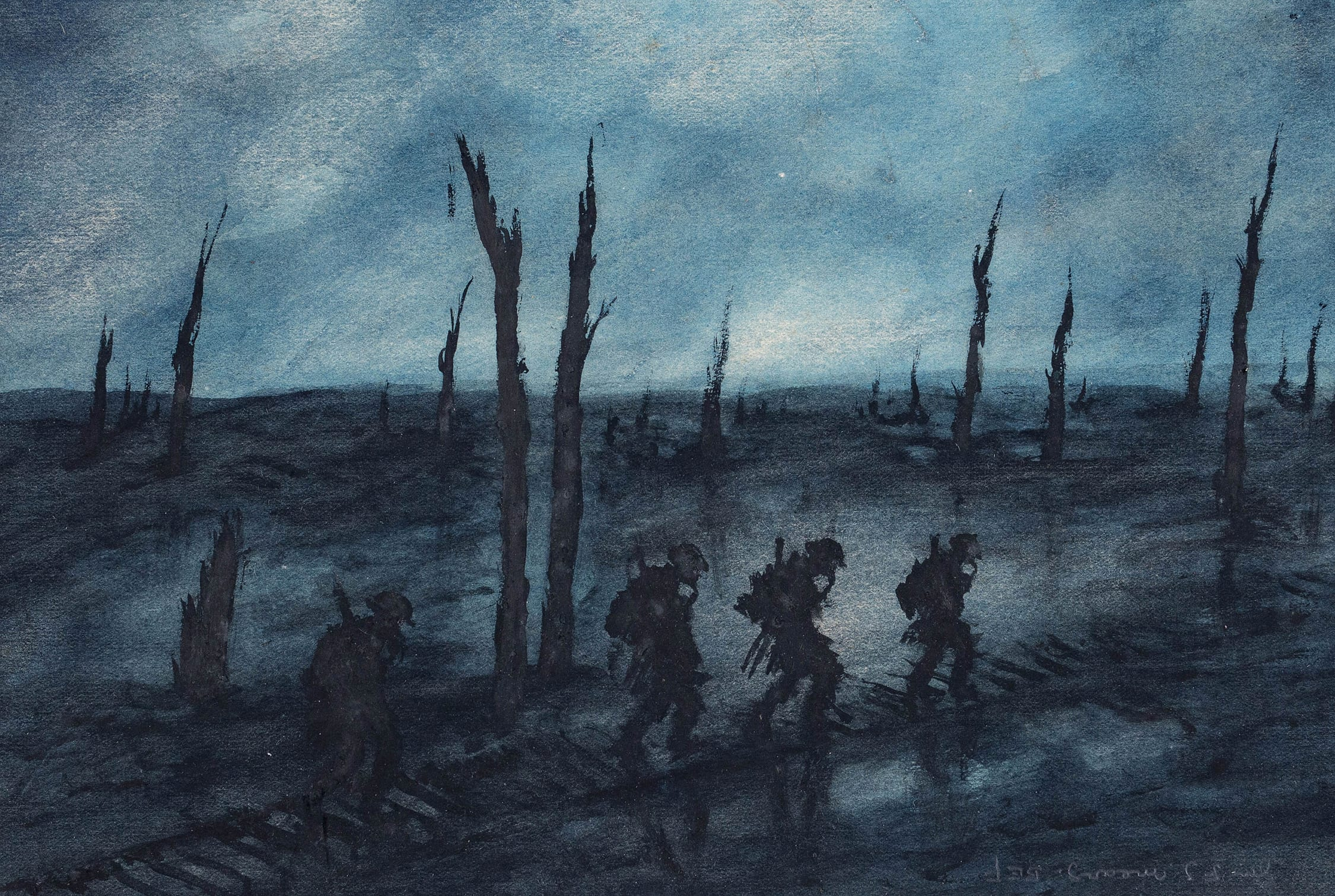
One of Mears' paintings of a WW1 battlefield at night

After the war, he was unfit for his previous work and living on a weekly disablement pension of 8s (equivalent to £26 in 2023). With the encouragement of his wife, and despite having no formal art training, he painted a number of scenes of battlefields at night, featuring silhouetted soldiers. He worked in pencil or ink and watercolour, on paper, sometimes embellished with silver paint.

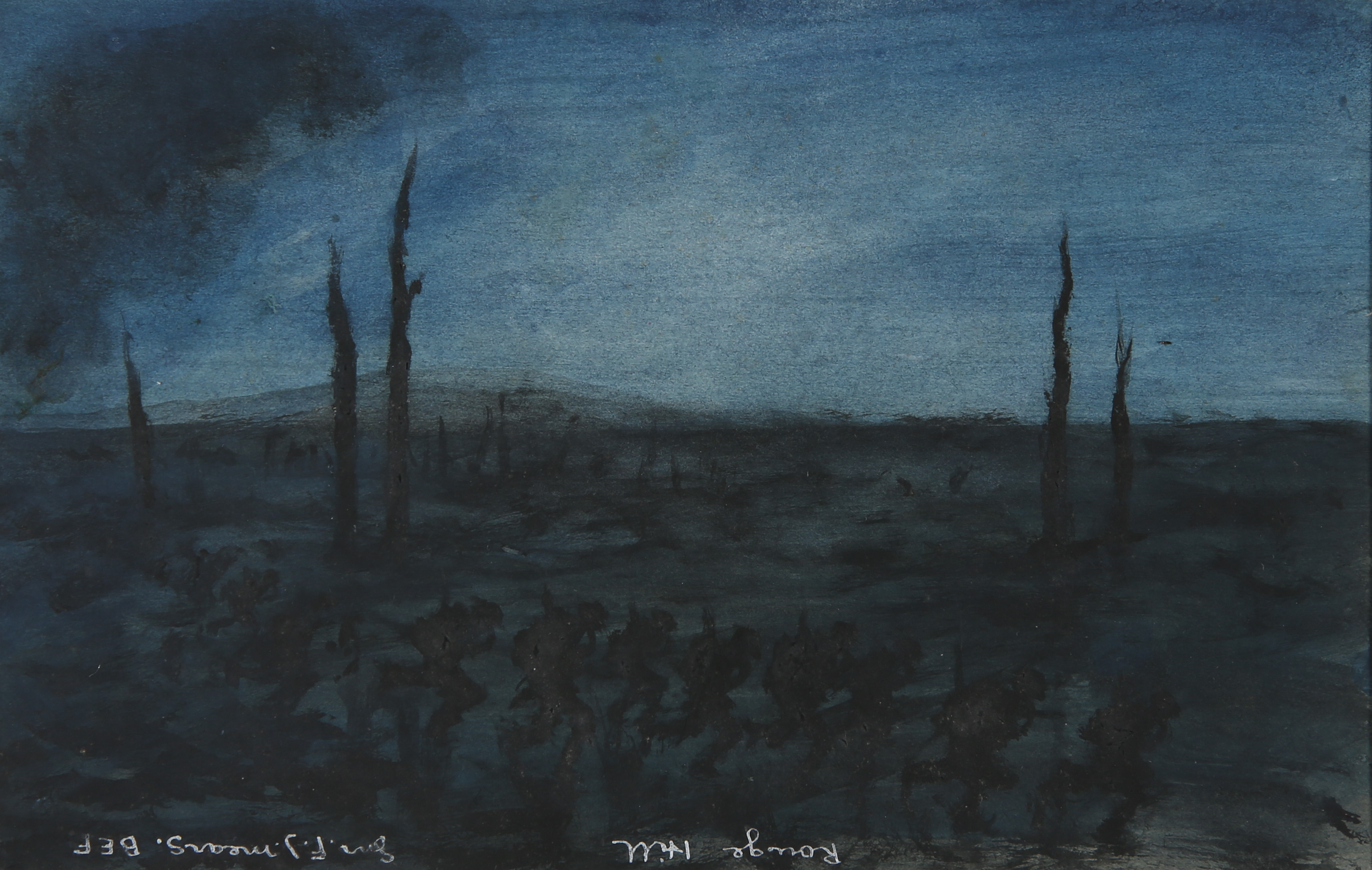
Rouge Hill – note the upside-down signature

He signed his work "Gnr FJ Mears BEF", or "Gnr FJ Mears RGA BEF", but always wrote this upside down, explaining: "The whole of the World is upside down... Why then should my signature only be the right way up?".

He described one of his early works as:

a picture of a shattered, splintered trees crying aloud ... against the horrors of it all, of dark sinister pools of mud, of a troubled sky, and of insignificant little crouching figures running across a shell-swept road

That picture was advertised for sale in the window of a shop on Piccadilly and was bought by Dame Katharine Furse, who had led the British Red Cross' Voluntary Aid Detachment force during the war. It was said that income from the sale rescued Mears and his wife from poverty and destitution—it was reported in the press that, before this, "one day they shared a kipper, another day they had a few potatoes".

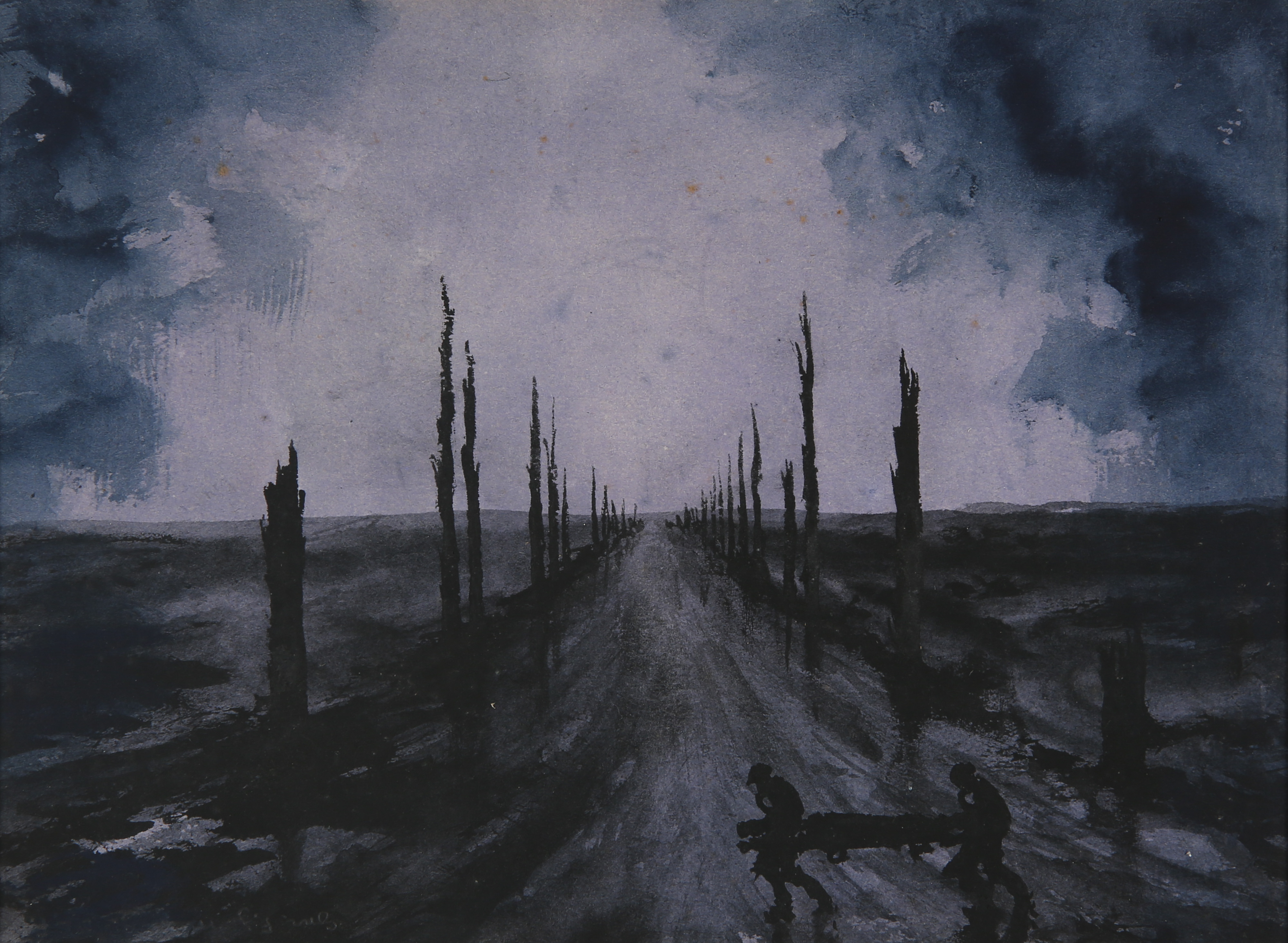
The Menin Road. Broken trees, a road disappearing towards the horizon, and stretcher bearers, were all common motifs in Mears' work.

In May 1920 an exhibition of his work, at the George C. Clackner Gallery at 20, Old Bond Street, London, included 30 paintings. Their buyers included Lieutenant General Hubert Gough, who had commanded the British Fifth Army from 1916 to 1918, Major-General John Ponsonby (Gough's successor), the American actress and singer Elsie Janis, John Wodehouse, 3rd Earl of Kimberley, Gwendolen Fitzalan-Howard, Duchess of Norfolk, and Nancy, Lady Astor. A review in The Daily News of 7 May 1920 was headlined:

Art genius who paints in a garret. Lowly man's pictures bought by aristocracy. Dukes as customers.

His address was given in May 1920 as 13, Windmill Street, Tottenham Court Road, London, where he and his wife occupied "a room about 9ft by 6ft" with no bed, because they could not afford to buy one. Another address, written on the reverse of some of his works, was given as "Fern Villa, Markenfield Road, Guildford, Surrey".

Mears died in 1929, at the age of 38 or 39, due to the effects of the gas he had inhaled during the war.

== Legacy ==
Mears' works are in public collections, including several at the Imperial War Museums, and eight in the World War History & Art Museum (formerly of Alliance, Ohio and now a touring collection).

A number of his paintings were included in the Brushes with War: Art From The Front Line exhibition at Kelvingrove Art Gallery and Museum.
