= Leycester Meares =

Australian judge (1909–1994)

Leycester Meares AC, CMG, QC

Judge of the Supreme Court of New South Wales
- In office 2 June 1969 – 4 February 1979

Personal details
- Born: 16 January 1909 Sydney
- Died: 5 August 1994 (aged 85) Kirribilli, New South Wales
- Parent(s): Charles Devenish-Meares, Mary Anna Brown
- Relatives: Half brother of Stanley Devenish Meares CBE
- Education: Newington College; University of Sydney
- Occupation: Barrister, Queen's Counsel, Judge

(Charles) Leycester Devenish Meares AC, CMG, QC (16 January 1909 – 5 August 1994) was an Australian judge and patron of the arts. He was also chairman and benefactor of the national child safety organisation Kidsafe.
The Leycester Meares Award for innovative design in children's play equipment is awarded annually in his honour at the Australian Kidsafe Awards.

== Early life ==
Leycester Meares was born in Sydney and attended Newington College (1924–1926). In 1927 he went up to the University of Sydney and graduated in law in 1932.

== Legal career ==
Meares was admitted to the NSW Bar in 1932 and was appointed Queen's Counsel in 1954. He appeared in the trial of both The Wagon Mound (No 1), and the Wagon Mound (No 2). In 1967 he was named as an acting judge of the Supreme Court of New South Wales. The position was made permanent in 1969. Other legal positions held included president of the Martial Appeals Tribunal, president of the New South Wales Medico-Legal Society, president of the Australian Bar Association and chairman of the NSW Law Reform Commission.

== War service ==
Meares served with the Australian Army in World War II, attained the rank of temporary lieutenant colonel and was mentioned in despatches.

== Community involvement ==
He served as chairman of the National Advisory Council for the Handicapped, and was foundation chairman of Kidsafe from 1979.

Justice Meares was the founding chair of the Australian Vietnam War Veterans' Trust (AVWVT) from 1985 until 1991. The AVWVT was the body responsible for distributing the Australian portion of the Agent Orange class action settlement in the US. AVWVT is now known as the Australian Veterans' Children Assistance Trust (AVCAT) and provides scholarships for the children and grandchildren of Australian veterans.

== Honours ==
- Companion of the Order of St Michael and St George – 1978, for service to the community, especially to the handicapped.
- Companion of the Order of Australia – 1985, for distinguished public service to the Australian honours system and for continued distinguished service in the field of social welfare.
