= Fred Jarvis (cricketer) =

Australian cricketer (1868–1938)

Personal information
- Full name: Alfred Jarvis
- Born: 15 February 1868; Hindmarsh, Adelaide, South Australia
- Died: 12 August 1938 (aged 70); Semaphore, Adelaide, South Australia
- Batting: Right-handed
- Bowling: Right-arm fast-medium
- Relatives: Affie Jarvis (brother)

Domestic team information
- Years: Team
- 1889-90 to 1905-06: South Australia

Career statistics
Competition	First-class
Matches	56
Runs scored	1,867
Batting average	20.51
100s/50s	1/7
Top score	154
Balls bowled	9,185
Wickets	110
Bowling average	37.14
5 wickets in innings	2
10 wickets in match	0
Best bowling	6/114
Catches/stumpings	40/0
- Source: Cricinfo, 24 October 2019

Alfred Jarvis (15 February 1868 – 12 August 1938) was an Australian cricketer who played first-class cricket for South Australia from 1889 to 1906. He was the younger brother of the Test player Affie Jarvis.

Fred Jarvis was an all-rounder who often opened the bowling and batted at various places in the order. He and George Giffen bowled unchanged to dismiss New South Wales for 62 in Sydney in 1891–92 to give South Australia an innings victory; Jarvis took 5 for 33. His highest first-class score was 154 against New South Wales in 1897–98 in another victory for South Australia. His best bowling figures were 6 for 114 against Western Australia in 1898–99, when he also captained South Australia and top-scored in the first innings with 48.

Jarvis lived in Adelaide most of his life, working for various firms including Harris Scarfe, but his final position was as government storekeeper on the River Murray locks near Loxton. He died after a stroke at the age of 70. He was unmarried.
