= Daniel R. Denison =

American academic

Daniel "Dan" R. Denison is professor of organization and management at IMD Business School in Lausanne, Switzerland, and chairman and founding partner of Denison Consulting. His area of special interest is organizational culture and leadership, and the impact they have on the performance and effectiveness of organizations. His work on organizational culture is heavily cited in the field, and he is the author of a seminal article on the distinction between organizational culture and climate (the notion of organizational climate predates that of the organizational culture). His model of organizational culture is widely known and used in academic research in organizational culture, effectiveness and performance.

== Biography ==
Denison received a bachelor's degree from Albion College, Michigan in psychology, sociology, and anthropology and his Ph.D. from the University of Michigan in organizational psychology.

Prior to joining IMD he was an associate professor of organizational behavior and human resource management at the University of Michigan School of Business Administration, teaching in MBA, Ph.D., and executive education programs. Professor Denison has taught and lived in Asia, Europe, Latin America, and the Middle East.

He is the author of the Denison Organizational Culture Survey and the Denison Leadership Development Surveys. These surveys and the underlying models have been used by over 3000 organizations and are the basis of several on-going research projects.

His articles have appeared in leading journals such as The Academy of Management Journal, The Academy of Management Review, Administrative Science Quarterly, Organization Science, Organizational Dynamics, The Journal of Organizational Behavior, Human Resource Management, and Policy Studies Review.

Denison also writes on the subject of applying American organizational culture, etc. theory in post-communist and transitional economies and notably Russia.

Denison has consulted with many leading corporations regarding organizational change, leadership development, and the cultural issues associated with mergers and acquisitions, turnarounds, and globalization.

== Bibliography ==
- Corporate Culture and Organizational Effectiveness (1990), John Wiley.
- Leading Culture Change in Global Organizations: Aligning Culture and Strategy (2012), Jossey-Bass.
