= William Meares =

New Zealand cricketer (1848–1923)

Personal information
- Full name: William Edward Devenish Meares
- Born: 14 December 1848; Kiama, Colony of New South Wales
- Died: 17 October 1923 (aged 74); Christchurch, Canterbury, New Zealand
- Role: Wicket-keeper
- Relatives: Frank Devenish-Meares (son)

Domestic team information
- Years: Team
- 1873/74–1876/77: Otago
- FC debut: 24 November 1873 Otago v Auckland
- Last FC: 17 January 1877 Otago v Canterbury
- Source: CricInfo, 16 May 2016

William Edward Devenish Meares (14 December 1848 – 17 October 1923) was an Australian-born New Zealand cricketer. He played in two first-class matches for Otago, one in each of the 1873–74 and 1876–77 seasons.

== Early and professional life ==
Meares was born at Kiama in the Australian Colony of New South Wales in 1848. He worked in the life insurance industry, working in Australia for the Victoria Insurance Company in Sydney before being appointed as the company's New Zealand manager in the early 1870s. He lived in Dunedin initially before moving to take up a job as the general manager of the Union Insurance Company at Christchurch. When the company was purchased by Alliance Assurance he remained as general manager of the new company at Christchurch, retiring in the 1910s.

== Cricket ==
Playing as both captain and wicket-keeper, Meares made his representative debut for Otago in a November 1873 first-class match against Auckland at South Dunedin Recreation Ground. He opened the batting, scoring six runs in his first innings and recording a duck in his second. He also took a wicket towards the end of the match. He also captained Otago during his second representative match, a January 1877 fixture against Canterbury at Christchurch, scoring three runs in his first innings and 10 in his second. Later in the year he played for a side of 22 Otago players against touring English team led by James Lillywhite. He also umpired some first-class matches.

== Later life and family ==
Meares was active in the Chamber of Commerce in both Dunedin and Christchurch and was described in an obituary as "a well-known figure in business circles in Christchurch for many years". He was the first person to be elected as a life-member of Canterbury Chamber of Commerce, and was also a member of the New Zealand Cricket Council―a motion passed after his death by the Council described him as "an enthusiastic supporter of cricket" who "had done, very good work on the Council". After his retirement Meares spent some time in England where one of his daughters was married in London in 1913.

After a period of illness, Meares died at Christchurch in 1923. He was aged 74 and was survived by a son and five daughters. His son, Frank Devenish-Meares, played three first-class matches in Australia at the turn of the 20th century as well as playing Australian rules football, captaining East Fremantle Football Club for a short time.
