= United States National Bowls Championships =

National Lawn bowls event

Tournament information
- Sport: Lawn bowls
- Location: United States
- Established: 1957
- Administrator: Bowls USA
- Website: Bowls USA

The United States National Bowls Championships is organised by Bowls USA. The first National Championships was held in 1957 for the men's singles event, which were held at the Spalding Inn in Whitefield, New Hampshire.

== History ==
Bowls in the United States is believed to have been in existence in Massachusetts and Connecticut as early as the mid-17th century. The sport in the United States probably originated from early settlers from the United Kingdom. Clubs existed long before the American Lawn Bowling Association was created in Buffalo, New York, on July 27, 1915. The Eastern and Western Divisions were created in 1937. Later, the Western Division split into the Southwest and Northwest divisions before the Midwestern states formed the Central Division in 1946. The Southeast division was established in 1951.

As of 2024, there are seven divisions (Southwest, Northwest, Southeast, Northeast, Central, Pacific Inter–Mountain and South Central) and the winners of each division qualify for National Championships.

== Men's champions ==
| Year | Singles | Pairs |
|---|---|---|
| 1957 | Leonard Schofield | not held |
| 1958 | Bill Tewksbury | Robert Savage & Peter Purden |
| 1959 | Bill Tewksbury | Jim Candelet & Robert Smart |
| 1960 | Arnold Lees | Tomas Stirrat & Fred Howarth |
| 1961 | Jim Candelet | Albert J. Presutti & George E. Dunn |
| 1962 | Howard S. Walker | Harold L. Esche & Claude K. Swafford |
| 1963 | Bill Tewksbury | Robert H. Russell & Dan Howarth |
| 1964 | Bill Tewksbury | Robert H. Russell & Donald A. Buckley |
| 1965 | Ezra Wyeth | Arthur H. Hartley & Edward J. Hayden |
| 1966 | Jim Candelet | William E. Kaestle & Stephen P. Howarth |
| 1967 | Bill Tewksbury | Harold L. Esch & Alfred C. Hughes |
| 1968 | George Dunn | Jim Candelet & Robert Smart |
| 1969 | Bill Tewksbury | Alex S. Lockhart & Clive Forrester |
| 1970 | Clive Forrester | F. Ray Grove Jr. & Bill Tewksbury |
| 1971 | Jim Candelet | Robert McGaffney & Bill Miller |
| 1972 | Neil McInnes | Neil McInnes & Ezra Wyeth |
| 1973 | Robert Boehm | John Milne & Albert Cline |
| 1974 | Dick Folkins | Neil McInnes & Ezra Wyeth |
| 1975 | Dick Folkins | Neil McInnes & Ezra Wyeth |
| 1976 | Bert G. MacWilliams | Dick Folkins & Gerald LaPask |
| 1977 | Orville Artist | Dick Folkins & Gerald LaPask |
| 1978 | Skippy Arculli | Francisco Souza & Douglas Coyle |
| 1979 | Bert G. MacWilliams | Dick Folkins & Gerald LaPask |
| 1980 | Jim Candelet | Neil McInnes & Arnold White |
| 1981 | Skippy Arculli | Neil McInnes & Arnold White |
| 1982 | Neil McInnes | Ken Degenhardt & Chester Schuller |
| 1983 | Bert G. MacWilliams | Jim Candelet & Skippy Arculli |
| 1984 | James Graham | Keith Lance & Arnold White |
| 1985 | Nick Christensen | Neil McInnes & Arnie Mortensen |
| 1986 | Roy Webb | John Johnson & Bill Craig |
| 1987 | Lewis Storm | Steve Jones & Saco Delgado |
| 1988 | Nick Christensen | Joe Shepard & Orville Artist |
| 1989 | Robert Boehm | Bert MacWilliams & William Farrell |
| 1990 | Neil McInnes | Ken Degenhardt & Jim Cavender |
| 1991 | Saco Delgado | Bert MacWilliams & William Farrell |
| 1992 | Ed Quo | Steve Jones & Francisco Souza |
| 1993 | Michael Siddall | Ken Degenhardt & John Stewart |
| 1994 | Francisco Souza | Ken Degenhardt & John Stewart |
| 1995 | Skippy Arculli | Jack Behling & Champ Salisbury |
| 1996 | Michael Siddall | Richard Sayer & Robert Sayer |
| 1997 | Jim Cavender | Sal Marino & Joseph Zinna |
| 1998 | Joel Stearn | Hugh Finlay & Neil McInnes |
| 1999 | Tom Stirrat | Ken Degenhardt & Leif Andresen |
| 2000 | Ed Quo | Richard Broad & Richard Kreuger |
| 2001 | Robert Nunes | Ivan Hyland & Michael Siddall |
| 2002 | Robert Nunes | Neville Sacks & Joseph Siegman |
| 2003 | Jim Olson | Mert Isaacman & Simon Meyerowitz |
| 2004 | Bob Schneider | Simon Meyerowitz & Robert Nunes |
| 2005 | Richard Broad | Lawrence Quill & Francisco Souza |
| 2006 | Jack Behling | Joe Zinna & Bob Schneider |
| 2007 | Jim Olson | Bob Sayer & Dick Sayer |
| 2008 | Michael Siddall | Tony Baer & Bill Brault |
| 2009 | Steve Nelson | Bob Schneider & Joe Zinna |
| 2010 | Jack Behling | Richard Broad & Jeff Covell |
| 2011 | Steve Smith | Tony Baer & Aaron Zangl |
| 2012 | Jon Burnoski | Neil Furman & Jason Adams |
| 2013 | Bill Brault | John Johnson & Andy Klubberud |
| 2014 | Andy Klubberud | Jeff Covell & Todd Wagers |
| 2015 | Bill Brault | Bob Schneider & Rob Behncke |
| 2016 | Scott Roberts | Steve Smith & Bill Brault |
| 2017 | Charlie Herbert | Steve Smith & Bill Brault |
| 2018 | Charlie Herbert | Steve Nelson & Bud Riccuci |
| 2019 | Charlie Herbert | Robert Busciglio & Matt Bauchiero |
2020 & 2021 cancelled due to COVID-19 pandemic
| 2022 | Charlie Herbert | Ian Ho & David Shaw |
| 2023 | Charlie Herbert | Scottie Marzonie & Frankie Napoli |
| 2024 | Charlie Herbert | Robert Behncke & Aaron Zangl |
| 2025 | Charlie Herbert | Rooz Ehdaie & Sadri Jazayeri |
| 2026 | Charlie Herbert | Angel Gomez & Javier Gomez |

== Women's champions ==
| Year | Singles | Pairs |
|---|---|---|
| 1977 | Pat Boehm | Edith Mac Williams & Dora Stewart |
| 1978 | Pat Boehm | Mable Hay & Eva Peterson |
| 1979 | Marie Gorman | Pat Boehm & Gladys Mallory |
| 1980 | Dorothy Henry | Tecla Shepard & Freda Schessler |
| 1981 | Harriet Bauer | Pat Boehm & Margaret Feldsher; Edith Denton & Irma Needham; Corinna Folkins & Helen Buckley |
| 1982 | Mary Scott | Kay LaPask & Rosalind Brown |
| 1983 | Loretta Geisner | Ellie Esch & Joyce Schindler |
| 1984 | Pat Boem | Tecla Shepard & Barbara Jones |
| 1985 | Kottia Spangler | Edith Miller & Frida Mixson |
| 1986 | Ruby Woodcock | Harriet Bauer & Theresa Day |
| 1987 | Joyce Schindler | Nora Dorman & Jo Gilbert |
| 1988 | Dorothy Henry | Nora Dorman & Jo Gilbert |
| 1989 | Tecla Shepard | Dorothy Henry & Elizabeth Torrens |
| 1990 | Nancy Hull-Ober | Isabella Forbes & Ceil Brown |
| 1991 | Ann Beckley | Gwen Amos & Kottia Spangler |
| 1992 | Ann Beckley | Anne Barber & Kottia Spangler |
| 1993 | Tecla Shepard | Leah Close & Nancy Hull-Ober |
| 1994 | Regina Banares | Mary Terrill & Jean Haigler |
| 1995 | Ann Barber | Kottia Spangler & Mary Delisle |
| 1996 | Regina Banares | Jo Gilbert & Patti Grabowski |
| 1997 | Patricia Gonzales | Peggy Salisbury & Vivien Schneider |
| 1998 | Mary Delisle | Irene Webster & Regina Banares |
| 1999 | Mary Terrill | Kathy Vea & Kottia Spangler |
| 2000 | Katy Stone | Dora Stewart & Doris Leibbrandt |
| 2001 | Kathryn Vea | Pat Gonzales & Robin Olson |
| 2002 | Patricia Gonzales | Kottia Spangler & Anne Nunes |
| 2003 | Anne Nunes | Lois Saladin & Eileen Luba |
| 2004 | Cecile Langevin | Kottia Spangler & Anne Nunes |
| 2005 | Rosa Gandara | Maryna Hyland & Katy Stone |
| 2006 | Rosa Gandara | Kottia Spangler & Anne Nunes |
| 2007 | Jackie Tucker | Eva Lee & Kim Heiser |
| 2008 | Rosa Gandara | Myra Wood & Lorraine Hitchcock |
| 2009 | Rosa Gandara | Patricia Cronshaw & Carrie Fossati |
| 2010 | Rosa Baer (née Gandara) | Kottia Spangler & Anne Nunes |
| 2011 | Rosa Baer (née Gandara) | Myra Wood & Lorraine Hitchcock |
| 2012 | Michele Arculli | Janice Bell & Nancy Nishikawa |
| 2013 | Kim Heiser | Anna Witt & Rebecca Nguyen |
| 2014 | Dee McSparran | Regina Banares & Jackie Tucker |
| 2015 | Anne Nunes | Myra Wood & Lorraine Hitchcock |
| 2016 | Margi Rambo | Kottia Spangler & Dee McSparran |
| 2017 | Anne Nunes | Dee McSparran & Alice Birkinshaw |
| 2018 | Sandy Wall | Anne Nunes & Kottia Spangler |
| 2019 | Anne Nunes | Dee McSparran & Reggie Banares |
2020 & 2021 cancelled due to COVID-19 pandemic
| 2022 | Anne Nunes | Sandy Wall & Martha Nilsen |
| 2023 | Anne Nunes | Sandy Wall & Martha Nilsen |
| 2024 | Giulia Gallo | Anna Witt & Rebecca Nguyen |
| 2025 | Anne Nunes | Dee McSparran & Cathy Selzler |
