= 1976 World Outdoor Bowls Championship =

Lawn bowls event

Men's World Outdoor Championships 1976
- 3rd Men's World Outdoor Bowls Championships
- Location: Zoo Lake Park, Johannesburg, South Africa
- Date: 18 February – 6 March 1976
- Category: World Bowls Championship

The 1976 Men's World Outdoor Bowls Championship was held at Zoo Lake Park in Johannesburg, South Africa, from 18 February to 6 March 1976.

Doug Watson won the singles which was held in a round robin format. South Africa completed a clean sweep of events by taking the pairs, triples and fours Gold which also help them lift the Leonard Trophy.

== Medallists ==
Event	Gold	Silver	Bronze
Men's singles	(South Africa); Doug Watson	(Australia); Bob Middleton	(England); David Bryant
Men's pairs	(South Africa); Doug Watson; Bill Moseley	(United States); Neil McInnes; Dick Folkins	(Australia); Don Woolnough; Bob Middleton
Men's triples	(South Africa); Kevin Campbell; Nando Gatti; Kelvin Lightfoot	(England); David Bryant; Bill Irish; Tommy Armstrong	Willie Murray; David Hull; John Higgins
Men's fours	(South Africa); Kevin Campbell; Nando Gatti; Kelvin Lightfoot; Bill Moseley	(Australia); Don Woolnough; Leigh Bishop; Barry Salter; Keith Poole	(England); John C Evans; Bill Irish; Tommy Armstrong; Peter Line
Men's Team	South Africa	England	Australia

== Men's singles ==
=== Round-robin results ===
Round	Tie 1	Tie 2	Tie 3	Tie 4	Tie 5	Tie 6	Tie 7	Tie 8
Round 1; 27 Feb	WAL 21 IRL 10	AUS 21 JEY 15	USA 21 JPN 7	ZAF 21 MWI 4	ENG 21 HKG 7	ISR 21 NZL 16	SCO 21 GGY 7	RHO 21 WSM 14
Round 2; 27 Feb	RHO 21 GGY 19	WSM 21 HKG 11	IRL 21 JEY 11	ENG 21 JPN 3	USA 21 MWI 7	ZAF 21 WAL 9	NZL 21 SCO 15	AUS 21 ISR 19
Round 3; 28 Feb	SCO 21 JEY 6	ZAF 21 ISR 7	NZL 21 AUS 13	ENG 21 IRL 12	WAL 21 JPN 10	HKG 21 MWI 10	USA 21 RHO 17	GGY 21 WSM 19
Round 4; 28 Feb	AUS 21 ENG 18	ZAF 21 GGY 18	WAL 21 SCO 13	USA 21 JEY 14	RHO 21 JPN 4	MWI 21 IRL 15	ISR 21 HKG 16	NZL 21 WSM 8
Round 5; 1 Mar	ZAF 21 JEY 7	WSM 21 MWI 7	IRL 21 HKG 10	USA 21 WAL 3	ISR 21 JPN 5	GGY 21 ENG 14	AUS 21 SCO 17	RHO 21 NZL 20
Round 6; 1 Mar	USA 21 IRL 8	NZL 21 HKG 16	WSM 21 JEY 10	ZAF 21 RHO 9	SCO 21 MWI 3	AUS 21 JPN 1	ENG 21 ISR 3	WAL 21 GGY 12
Round 7; 2 Mar	WAL 21 MWI 7	AUS 21 GGY 5	NZL 21 ENG 5	JEY 21 JPN 5	RHO 21 HKG 18	USA 21 ISR 19	ZAF 21 WSM 20	SCO 21 IRL 19
Round 8; 2 Mar	HKG 21 WAL 18	ZAF 21 USA 19	SCO 21 RHO 7	ENG 21 JEY 13	GGY 21 JPN 6	WSM 21 ISR 11	AUS 21 IRL 12	NZL 21 MWI 17
Round 9; 3 Mar	ZAF 21 IRL 5	WAL 21 RHO 18	NZL 21 USA 20	SCO 21 ISR 12	AUS 21 HKG 11	WSM 21 ENG 20	MWI 21 JPN 8	GGY 21 JEY 11
Round 10; 3 Mar	IRL 21 JPN 4	WSM 21 WAL 20	GGY 21 NZL 20	RHO 21 AUS 19	ZAF 21 HKG 11	ISR 21 JEY 13	SCO 21 USA 8	ENG 21 MWI 14
Round 11; 4 Mar	RHO 21 IRL 9	AUS 21 WSM 13	WAL 21 ISR 14	GGY 21 MWI 13	NZL 21 JEY 6	ZAF 21 SCO 15	ENG 21 USA 15	HKG 21 JPN 9
Round 12; 5 Mar	WAL 21 AUS 13	SCO 21 WSM 9	ZAF 21 JPN 1	USA 21 GGY 8	HKG 21 JEY 4	ENG 21 RHO 18	NZL 21 IRL 19	ISR 21 MWI 16
Round 13; 5 Mar	AUS 21 USA 17	MWI 21 JEY 19	RHO 21 ISR 12	ENG 21 WAL 16	GGY 21 IRL 18	ZAF 21 NZL 20	WSM 21 JPN 5	HKG 21 SCO 11
Round 14; 6 Mar	ZAF 21 AUS 12	USA 21 WSM 16	IRL 21 ISR 2	NZL 21 JPN 5	RHO 21 MWI 18	GGY 21 HKG 16	WAL 21 JEY 18	ENG 21 SCO 16
Round 15; 6 Mar	AUS bt MWI	ISR bt GGY	USA bt HKG	WSM bt IRL	SCO bt JPN	JEY bt RHO	WAL bt NZL	ENG 21 ZAF 10

=== Final table ===
Pos	Player	P	W	L	Pts
1	(South Africa) Doug Watson	15	14	1	14
2	(Australia) Bob Middleton	15	11	4	11
3	(England) David Bryant	15	11	4	11
4	(United States) Dick Folkins	15	10	5	10
5	(New Zealand) Kerry Clark	15	10	5	10
6	(Wales) Maldwyn Evans	15	10	5	10
7	(Scotland) Willie Wood	15	9	6	9
8	(Rhodesia) John Allman	15	9	6	9
9	(Samoa) Tolova'a Si'moa	15	8	7	8
10	(Guernsey) Roy de Feu	15	8	7	8
11	(Israel) Matt Gordon	15	6	9	6
12	(Hong Kong) Eric Liddell	15	5	10	5
13	Roy Fulton	15	4	11	4
14	(Malawi) Harry Lakin	15	2	13	2
15	(Jersey) Ben Van Niekerk	15	2	13	2
16	(Japan) Shingo Sarumaru	15	0	15	0

== Men's pairs ==
=== Round-robin results ===
Round	Tie 1	Tie 2	Tie 3	Tie 4	Tie 5	Tie 6	Tie 7	Tie 8
Round 1; 18 Feb	HKG 20 IRL 17	ZAF 31 JEY 12	RHO 21 NZL 15	WSM 18 MWI 14	ENG 33 GGY 12	USA 18 WAL 15	AUS 24 SCO 20	IRL 47 JPN 2
Round 2; 19 Feb	IRL 20 JEY 19	AUS 34 ISR 7	HKG 19 WSM 17	USA 21 MWI 16	RHO 27 GGY 15	ENG 51 JPN 8	NZL 25 SCO 21	WAL 22 ZAF 19
Round 3; 19 Feb	ENG v AUS	ZAF bt GGY	HKG v ISR	IRL v MWI	RHO bt JPN	JEY v USA	NZL v WSM	SCO v WAL
Round 4; 20 Feb	GGY 17 WAL 17	SCO 34 MWI 14	HKG 17 NZL 15	WSM 28 JEY 12	USA 21 IRL 15	AUS 66 JPN 3	ENG 21 ISR 15	ZAF 29 RHO 7
Round 5; 20 Feb	AUS v USA	ENG v WAL	IRL bt GGY	ISR v RHO	WSM bt JPN	JEY v MWI	ZAF bt NZL	SCO 26 HKG 11
Round 6; 21 Feb	WAL 23 IRL 12	USA 50 JPN 4	ENG 16 HKG 13	WSM 24 RHO 18	ZAF 38 MWI 10	AUS 34 JEY 7	NZL 27 ISR 16	SCO 36 GGY 21
Round 7; 21 Feb	RHO 22 MWI 13	USA 26 WSM 16	ISR 27 IRL 15	ZAF 30 AUS 17	NZL 49 JPN 8	WAL 23 JEY 16	ENG 24 SCO 18	HKG 16 GGY 15
Round 8; 23 Feb	WAL 22 MWI 17	USA 28 ISR 13	ZAF 45 WSM 5	IRL 28 SCO 13	RHO 30 HKG 10	AUS 27 GGY 17	NZL 21 ENG 19	JEY 36 JPN 8
Round 9; 23 Feb	WAL 53 JPN 7	HKG 29 MWI 16	RHO 25 USA 14	WSM 26 GGY 22	SCO 35 JEY 11	NZL 26 AUS 22	IRL 21 ENG 12	ZAF 28 ISR 11
Round 10; 24 Feb	ISR 24 SCO 17	ZAF 25 IRL 18	RHO 16 WAL 15	ENG 35 WSM 12	AUS 22 HKG 20	GGY 22 JEY 13	MWI 33 JPN 15	USA 21 NZL 16
Round 11; 24 Feb	AUS v IRL	ENG v JEY	GGY bt JPN	HKG v WAL	ISR v WSM	NZL v MWI	SCO 21 RHO 11	ZAF 26 USA 16
Round 12; 25 Feb	ZAF 36 HKG 14	IRL 45 JPN 3	ENG 27 MWI ?	JEY 26 ISR 16	AUS 19 RHO 16	WSM 20 WAL 19	NZL 23 GGY 19	USA 24 SCO 21
Round 13; 25 Feb	ENG 21 ZAF 12	AUS 32 MWI 13	NZL 25 WAL 17	RHO 26 JEY 14	IRL 18 WSM 18	USA 22 HKG 13	ISR 20 GGY 12	SCO 44 JPN 12
Round 14; 26 Feb	ZAF 41 JPN 7	HKG 22 JEY 19	WAL 26 AUS 17	SCO 34 WSM 10	IRL 23 NZL 18	USA 23 GGY 16	ENG 17 RHO 16	ISR 18 MWI 17
Round 15; 26 Feb	AUS 25 WSM 22	ENG 22 USA 14	MWI 23 GGY 11	HKG 60 JPN 5	IRL 18 RHO 15	WAL 23 ISR 15	NZL 35 JEY 18	ZAF 32 SCO 10

=== Final table ===
Pos	Player	P	W	D	L	Pts
1	(South Africa) Doug Watson & Bill Moseley	15	13	0	2	26
2	(United States) Neil McInnes & Dick Folkins	15	11	0	4	22
3	(Australia) Don Woolnough & Bob Middleton	15	10	1	4	21
4	(England) John C Evans & Peter Line	15	10	1	4	21
5	(Wales) John Russell Evans & Maldwyn Evans	15	9	1	5	19
6	Roy Fulton & John Henry	15	9	1	5	19
7	(Rhodesia) John Allman & Alan Bradley	15	9	0	6	18
8	(New Zealand) Kerry Clark & Vic Sellars	15	9	0	6	18
9	(Samoa) Tolova'a Si'moa & Falevi Petana	15	8	1	6	17
10	(Scotland) Jack Christie & Alex McIntosh	15	8	1	6	17
11	(Hong Kong) Eric Liddell & Clementi Cecil Delgado	15	8	0	7	16
12	(Israel) Matt Gordon & Robert Goldwasser	15	5	0	10	10
13	(Malawi) Peter Crossan & Harry Lakin	15	3	0	12	6
14	(Jersey) Gordon Bewhay & Joe Dolan	15	3	0	12	6
15	(Guernsey) E. Baker & Roy de Feu	15	2	1	12	5
16	Japan	15	0	0	15	0

== Men's triples ==
=== Round-robin results ===
Round	Tie 1	Tie 2	Tie 3	Tie 4	Tie 5	Tie 6	Tie 7	Tie 8
Round 1; 18 Feb	NZL 19 RHO 16	WSM 17 MWI 16	AUS 15 SCO 15	ENG 26 GGY 13	ZAF 35 JEY 11	ISR 37 JPN 8	HKG 16 IRL 14	WAL 17 USA 11
Round 2; 19 Feb	SCO 21 NZL 14	HKG 17 WSM 16	AUS 20 ISR 8	IRL 25 JEY 7	RHO 27 GGY 11	ENG 64 JPN 7	USA 22 MWI 12	WAL v ZAF
Round 3; 19 Feb	ENG 14 AUS 13	GGY v ZAF	HKG v ISR	IRL bt MWI	JPN v RHO	JEY v USA	NZL v WSM	SCO v WAL
Round 4; 20 Feb	AUS 37 JPN 5	WAL 29 GGY 10	NZL 19 HKG 18	SCO 22 MWI 14	IRL 21 USA 15	JEY 16 WSM 11	ENG 18 ISR 17	ZAF 32 RHO 7
Round 5; 20 Feb	AUS v USA	ENG bt WAL	IRL bt GGY	ISR v RHO	WSM bt JPN	JEY v MWI	ZAF bt NZL	SCO 21 HKG 15
Round 6; 21 Feb	IRL 15 WAL 13	ENG 28 HKG 5	SCO 23 GGY 4	AUS 28 JEY 10	NZL 23 ISR 7	WSM 15 RHO 13	USA 30 JPN 8	ZAF 19 MWI 15
Round 7; 21 Feb	NZL 52 JPN 4	USA 28 WSM 14	ZAF 22 AUS 17	HKG 22 GGY 13	ENG 18 SCO 13	MWI 16 RHO 12	IRL 27 ISR 14	JEY 22 WAL 22
Round 8; 23 Feb	AUS 15 GGY 18	ZAF 30 WSM 5	JEY 42 JPN 4	USA 28 ISR 7	NZL 35 ENG 11	HKG 16 RHO 11	WAL 25 MWI 13	IRL 22 SCO 15
Round 9; 23 Feb	AUS 22 NZL 16	MWI 20 HKG 15	SCO 28 JEY 17	WAL 43 JPN 5	GGY 20 WSM 10	ZAF 23 ISR 12	IRL 20 ENG 14	USA 19 RHO 16
Round 10; 24 Feb	ISR 16 SCO 16	ENG 16 WSM 12	WAL 22 RHO 18	ZAF 18 IRL 13	HKG 16 AUS 13	USA 18 NZL 10	MWI 49 JPN 9	GGY 18 JEY 14
Round 11; 24 Feb	AUS v IRL	ENG v JEY	GGY bt JPN	HKG v WAL	ISR v WSM	NZL v MWI	SCO v RHO	ZAF 24 USA 10
Round 12; 25 Feb	IRL 49 JPN 3	JEY 20 ISR 17	NZL 29 GGY 4	USA 20 SCO 5	ENG 19 MWI 9	WAL 22 WSM 14	RHO 13 AUS 11	ZAF 21 HKG 15
Round 13; 25 Feb	RHO 22 JEY 16	IRL 23 WSM 9	MWI 14 AUS 10	SCO 51 JPN 2	ISR 21 GGY 12	NZL 21 WAL 12	USA 16 HKG 13	ENG 25 ZAF 15
Round 14; 26 Feb	SCO 24 WSM 11	ZAF 52 JPN 2	ENG 21 RHO 9	MWI 22 ISR 14	HKG 23 JEY 14	WAL 14 AUS 12	IRL 19 NZL 10	GGY 15 USA 14
Round 15; 26 Feb	AUS 37 WSM 5	USA 20 ENG 7	GGY 20 MWI 20	HKG 39 JPN 6	RHO 18 IRL 10	WAL 18 ISR 15	NZL 24 JEY 12	ZAF 16 SCO 15

=== Final table ===
Pos	Player	P	W	D	L	Pts
1	(South Africa) Kevin Campbell, Nando Gatti & Kelvin Lightfoot	15	14	0	1	28
2	(England) David Bryant, Bill Irish & Tommy Armstrong	15	12	0	3	24
3	Willie Murray, David Hull & John Higgins	15	11	0	4	22
4	(New Zealand) David Baldwin, John Somerville & Bob McDonald	15	10	0	5	20
5	(United States) Jim Candelet, Harold Esch & Francisco Frank Souza	15	10	0	5	20
6	(Wales) Dai Richards, Ray Williams & Ellis Stanbury	15	9	1	5	19
7	(Hong Kong) George Souza Sr., Roberto da Silva & Omar Dallah	15	9	0	6	18
8	(Scotland) Willie Wood, Dick Bernard & Willie Adrain	15	7	2	6	16
9	(Australia) Leigh Bishop, Barry Salter & Keith Poole	15	7	1	7	15
10	(Rhodesia) Dick Boucher, Theo Easterbrook, Pat O'Brien	15	7	0	8	14
11	(Malawi) John Chalmers, Stuart Flanders & Alexander Sandy Ross	15	5	1	9	11
12	(Guernsey) Cyril Smith, Henry le Tissier & Norman le Ber	15	5	1	9	11
13	(Jersey) Ben Van Niekerk, Tim Mallett & Frank Hambly	15	4	1	10	9
14	(Israel) Harry Esakov, Sam Skudowitz, Yehuda Sabra Lebel	15	3	1	11	7
15	(Samoa) Leta’a Sulu Devoe, James Williams & Graham Johns	15	3	0	12	6
16	Japan	15	0	0	15	0

== Men's fours ==
=== Round-robin results ===
Round	Tie 1	Tie 2	Tie 3	Tie 4	Tie 5	Tie 6	Tie 7	Tie 8
Round 1; 27 Feb	SCO 23 GGY 17	NZL 30 ISR 13	RHO 21 WSM 13	ENG 20 HKG 20	IRL 24 WAL 23	USA 49 JPN 4	ZAF 28 MWI 10	AUS 37 JEY 11
Round 2; 27 Feb	ZAF 16 WAL 14	AUS 28 ISR 12	ENG 42 JPN 10	SCO 23 NZL 18	HKG 22 WSM 13	RHO 31 GGY 10	JEY 24 IRL 19	USA 22 MWI 18
Round 3; 28 Feb	AUS 29 NZL 14	WSM 29 GGY 17	HKG 26 MWI 10	SCO 22 JEY 8	USA 20 RHO 19	WAL 40 JPN 9	ENG 19 IRL 12	ZAF 35 ISR 7
Round 4; 28 Feb	AUS 20 ENG 14	ZAF 26 GGY 14	WAL 20 SCO 15	NZL 24 WSM 13	RHO 23 JPN 8	MWI 21 IRL 17	HGK 25 ISR 15	USA 30 JEY 18
Round 5; 1 Mar	AUS 22 SCO 16	ZAF 28 JEY 12	IRL 18 HGK 15	ENG 21 GGY 15	NZL 24 RHO 12	ISR 34 JPN 14	USA 17 WAL 13	MWI 17 WSM 26
Round 6; 1 Mar	MWI 21 SCO 18	JEY 22 WSM 14	WAL 44 GGY 8	ZAF 29 RHO 16	NZL 25 HKG 13	AUS 36 JPN 13	ENG 26 ISR 17	USA 16 IRL 13
Round 7; 2 Mar	ZAF 27 WSM 15	SCO 22 IRL 12	ENG 25 NZL 16	AUS 31 GGY 10	HKG 24 RHO 10	WAL 30 MWI 6	ISR 20 USA 15	JEY 20 JPN 16
Round 8; 2 Mar	RHO 22 SCO 12	GGY 37 JPN 5	ZAF 24 USA 14	AUS 19 IRL 15	MWI 19 NZL 18	ENG 21 JEY 12	HKG 18 WAL 18	WSM 22 ISR 18
Round 9; 3 Mar	IRL 24 ZAF 13	RHO 16 WAL 7	NZL 19 USA 16	SCO 28 ISR 8	AUS 22 HKG 17	ENG 21 WSM 16	GGY 31 JEY 14	MWI 18 JPN 16
Round 10; 3 Mar	IRL 47 JPN 6	WAL 27 WSM 23	NZL 28 GGY 12	AUS 27 RHO 12	ZAF 30 HKG 8	ISR 25 JEY 12	SCO 18 USA 17	ENG 21 MWI 9
Round 11; 4 Mar	JEY 17 NZL 16	ZAF 32 SCO 11	RHO 18 IRL 18	AUS 21 WSM 17	GGY 20 MWI 19	WAL 33 ISR 13	HKG 26 JPN 21	ENG 23 USA 17
Round 12; 5 Mar	ENG 24 RHO 17	WSM 20 SCO 16	JEY 27 HKG 14	AUS 20 WAL 12	ZAF 47 JPN 2	IRL 22 NZL 17	USA 26 GGY 13	MWI 21 ISR 17
Round 13; 5 Mar	WSM 34 JPN 8	SCO 19 HKG 18	IRL 32 GGY 13	RHO 29 ISR 15	ZAF 37 NZL 18	JEY 19 MWI 18	WAL 22 ENG 18	AUS 18 USA 15
Round 14; 6 Mar	ZAF 25 AUS 16	RHO 22 MWI 14	IRL 22 ISR 9	WAL 24 JEY 17	GGY 24 HKG 19	NZL 47 JPN 9	SCO 28 ENG 21	USA 28 WSM 16
Round 15; 6 Mar	AUS bt MWI	ISR bt GGY	USA bt HKG	IRL v WSM	SCO bt JPN	JEY bt RHO	WAL bt NZL	ZAF 15 ENG 13

=== Final table ===
Pos	Player	P	W	D	L	Pts
1	(South Africa) Kevin Campbell, Nando Gatti, Kelvin Lightfoot & Bill Moseley	15	14	0	1	28
2	(Australia) Don Woolnough, Leigh Bishop, Barry Salter & Keith Poole	15	14	0	1	28
3	(England) John C Evans, Bill Irish, Tommy Armstrong & Peter Line	15	10	1	4	21
4	(Wales) Dai Richards, John Russell Evans, Ellis Stanbury, Ray Williams	15	9	1	5	19
5	(United States) Jim Candelet, Harold Esch, Dick Folkins, Francisco Frank Souza	15	9	0	6	18
6	(Scotland) Jack Christie, Alex McIntosh, Dick Bernard & Willie Adrain	15	9	0	6	18
7	John Henry, John Higgins, David Hull, Willie Murray	15	8	1	6	17
8	(New Zealand) David Baldwin, Bob McDonald, John Somerville, Vic Sellars	15	8	0	7	16
9	(Rhodesia) Alan Bradley, Theo Easterbrook, Dick Boucher, Pat O'Brien	15	7	1	7	15
10	(Hong Kong) Omar Dallah, Saco Delgado, Roberto da Silva, George Souza Sr.	15	5	2	9	12
11	(Jersey) Gordon Bewhay, Joe Dolan, Frank Hambly, Tim Mallett	15	6	0	9	12
12	(Samoa) Leta’a Sulu Devoe, Graham Johns, James Williams, Falevi Ierupa’ala Petana	15	5	0	10	10
13	(Malawi) John Chalmers, Peter Crossan, Stuart Flanders, Alexander Sandy Ross	15	5	0	10	10
14	(Guernsey) Ernie Baker, Norman le Ber, Henry le Tissier, Cyril Smith	15	4	0	11	8
15	(Israel) Harry Esakov, Robert Goldwasser, Sam Skudowitz, Yehuda Sabra Lebel	15	4	0	11	8
16	(Japan) Mitsuaki Izumi, Kichizaemon Sarumaru, Tadao Nishi, Shigeya Nabeshima	15	0	0	15	0

== W. M. Leonard Trophy ==
Pos	Team	Singles	Pairs	Triples	Fours	Total
1	South Africa	16	16	16	16	64
2	England	14	13	15	14	56
3	Australia+	15	14	8	15	52
4	United States	13	15	12	12	52
5	Wales	11	12	11	13	47
6	New Zealand	12	9	13	9	43
7	Ireland	4	11	14	10	39
8	Scotland	10	7	9	11	37
9	Rhodesia	9	10	7	8	34
10	Hong Kong	5	6	10	7	28
11	Western Samoa	8	8	2	5	23
12	Malawi	3	4	6	4	17
13	Guernsey	7	2	5	3	17
14	Israel	6	5	3	2	16
15	Jersey	2	3	4	6	15
16	Japan	1	1	1	1	4

+ more shots
