= Errol Stewart =

Errol Stewart may refer to:

- Errol Stewart (South African sportsman) (born 1969), former South African cricketer and rugby union player
- Errol Stewart (sprinter) (born 1950), Jamaican former sprinter
- Errol Stewart (bowls) (born 1931), Australian lawn bowler
