= 1979 World Indoor Bowls Championship =

Bowls championship held in Coatbridge, North Lanarkshire

World Indoor Championships 1979
- 1st World Indoor Bowls Championships
- Location: (Scotland) Coatbridge, North Lanarkshire
- Date: 10 January - 14 January 1979.
- Category: World Indoor Championships

The 1979 W.D. & H.O. Wills World Indoor Bowls Championship was held at the Coatbridge indoor bowling club, North Lanarkshire, Scotland, from 10 to 14 January 1979.

The championship was a men's singles event in which David Bryant won his first title defeating Jim Donnelly 21-14 after a final that lasted 23 ends. The event was organised by the Monklands District Council with two round robin groups of five players. It was sponsored by tobacco industrialists W.D. & H.O. Wills.

== Draw and results ==
=== Group stages ===
==== Section A ====
- (England) David Bryant P4 W4
- (Northern Ireland) Jim Donnelly P4 W3
- (Australia) Errol Bungey P4 W2
- (England) Tony Dunton P4 W1
- (United States) Bill Farrell P4 W0

Player 1	Player 2	Score
Bryant	Farrell	21-13
Bryant	Bungey	21-13
Bryant	Dunton	21-15
Bryant	Donnelly	21-18
Donnelly	Farrell	21-9
Donnelly	Bungey	21-14
Donnelly	Dunton	21-18
Bungey	Dunton	21-19
Bungey	Farrell	21-6
Dunton	Farrell	21-15

==== Section B ====
- (Wales) Gwyn Evans P4 W4
- (Scotland) Jim Blake P4 W2
- (Hong Kong) Eric Liddell P4 W2
- (Canada) Bruce Matheson P4 W2
- (New Zealand) George Alley P4 W0

Player 1	Player 2	Score
Evans	Blake	21-13
Evans	Liddell	21-16
Evans	Matheson	21-17
Evans	Alley	21-8
Liddell	Blake	21-18
Blake	Matheson	21-11
Blake	Alley	21-4
Matheson	Liddell	21-11
Liddell	Alley	21-16
Matheson	Alley	21-15

=== Medal round ===
Semi-finals
(England) David Bryant	21
(Scotland) Jim Blake	17
(Northern Ireland) Jim Donnelly	21
(Wales) Gwyn Evans	15

Gold medal match
(England) David Bryant	21
(Northern Ireland) Jim Donnelly	14
Third place
(Scotland) Jim Blake	10
(Wales) Gwyn Evans	9
