= Doug Copland =

Scottish international lawn bowler

Personal information
- Nationality: British (Scottish)

Sport
- Club: Caledonian BC, Perth; Dundee IBC

Douglas "Doug" Copland is a former international lawn and indoor bowler from Scotland who competed at the Commonwealth Games.

== Biography ==
Copland was a member of the Caledonian Bowls Club in Perth and also played indoors for Dundee.

In 1977, he was called up by Scotland for the Worthing internationals and subsequently represented the Scottish team at the 1978 Commonwealth Games in Edmonton, Canada, where he competed in the fours event, with John Fleming, Dick Bernard and Willie Adrain. The team finished in fifth place.
