= Northern Ireland at the 1974 British Commonwealth Games =

- CG code: NIR
- CGA: Northern Ireland Commonwealth Games Council
- Website: nicgc.org

in Christchurch, New Zealand
- Flag bearers: Opening: Closing:
- Medals Ranked 9th: Gold 3 Silver 1 Bronze 2 Total 6

British Commonwealth Games appearances
- 1934; 1938; 1950; 1954; 1958; 1962; 1966; 1970; 1974; 1978; 1982; 1986; 1990; 1994; 1998; 2002; 2006; 2010; 2014; 2018; 2022; 2026; 2030

Other related appearances
- Ireland (1930)

Northern Ireland competed at the 1974 British Commonwealth Games in Christchurch, New Zealand, from 25 January to 2 February 1974.

Northern Ireland finished 9th in the medal table with three gold medals, one silver medal and two bronze medals.

The Northern Irish team was named in October 1973.

== Medalists ==
=== Gold ===
- Mike Bull (decathlon)
- Davy Larmour (boxing)
- Mary Peters (pentathlon)

=== Silver ===
- Mike Bull (pole vault)

=== Bronze ===
- Gordon Ferris (boxing)
- John Rodgers (boxing)

== Team ==
=== Officials ===
- Dick McColgan - General team amanager
- Derek Murray - Assistant team manager
- Sean Kyle - Athletics manager/coach
- Gerry Storey - Boxing trainer/coach
- Bob Thompson - Lawn bowls manager
- Billy Stewart - Cycling manager
- Tom Bodel - Swimming manager

=== Athletics ===
Men

Athlete	Events	Club	Medals
Mike Bull	pole vault, decathlon		,
Joe Chivers	200, 400m		
Charles James Kirkpatrick	110m hurdles		
William Alexander Kirkpatrick	long jump		
Raymond A. Knox	decathlon		
Paul Lawther	1500m		
John McLaughlin	marathon		
Mike Teer	marathon		

Women

Athlete	Events	Club	Medals
Avril McClelland	100, 200m		
Linda Joan McCurry	100, 200m		
Mary Peters	100m hurdles, high jump, pentathlon, shot put		Gold medal

=== Badminton ===
Men

Athlete	Events	Club	Medals
Colin Bell	singles, doubles, mixed	Malone Presbyterian Club	
David Doherty	singles, doubles, mixed	St. Jude's BC	

Women

Athlete	Events	Club	Medals
Barbara Beckett	singles, doubles, mixed	Alpha BC, Lisburn	
Dorothy Cunningham	singles, doubles, mixed	St. Jude's BC	

=== Boxing ===
Athlete	Events	Club	Medals
David Campbell	63.5kg light-welterweight		
Gordon Ferris	81kg middlweight		Bronze medal
Gerry Hamill	57kg featherweight		
Raymond Heaney	60kg lightweight		
Davy Larmour	51kg flyweight		Gold medal
John Rodgers	67kg welterweight		Bronze medal

=== Cycling ===
Athlete	Events	Club	Medals
William Hudson	scratch, pursuit, time trial		
Dave Kane	road race, scratch, time trial, pursuit		
Joseph Smyth	scratch, pursuit, time trial		

=== Lawn bowls ===
Athlete	Events	Club	Medals
Jim Craig	fours/rinks	Mossley BC	
Jimmy Dennison	fours/rinks	Banbridge BC	
Jimmy Donnelly	fours/rinks	Falls BC	
Roy Fulton	singles	Coleraine BC	
Billy Pimley	pairs	Falls BC	
Gerry Sloan	fours/rinks	Bangor BC	
Billy Tate	pairs	Shaftesbury BC	

=== Shooting ===
Athlete	Events	Club	Medals
Bertie Aitkin	50m rifle prone		
Ernie Neely	Fullbore fifle		
Ken Stanford	50m pistol, rapid fire pistol		
William Ward	50m rifle prone, fullbore rifle		

=== Swimming ===
Athlete	Events	Club	Medals
Ivan Corry	100, 200m breaststroke, medley relay		
Rob Howard	100m backstroke, medley relay		
Andrew Hunter	100m freestyle, medley relay		
Martin McGrory	100, 200m breaststroke, medley relay		

=== Weightlifting ===
Athlete	Events	Club	Medals
Alex McAfee	90kg middle-heavyweight		
Tommy McAfee	110kg heavyweight		
Paul Ross	67.5kg lightweight		
Joe Sheppard	82.5kg light-heavyweight		
