= 2023 World Outdoor Bowls Championship – Men's singles =

Bowls competition

2023 World Outdoor Bowls Championships – Men's singles
- 14th World Outdoor Bowls Championships
- Location: Gold Coast, Australia
- Date: 29 August to 10 September
- Category: World Bowls Championship

The 2023 World Outdoor Bowls Championship – Men's singles will be the 14th edition of the World Championships to be held on the Gold Coast in Queensland, Australia from 29 August to 10 September. There will be five venues; the Broadbeach Bowls Club, Musgrave Hill Bowls Club, Club Helensvale, Paradise Point Club and Mudgeraba Club.

The men's singles is one of eight events that will determine the 2023 world champions.

== Section tables ==
=== Section 1 ===
Team	Player	P	W	L	Shots	Pts
1	Gary Kelly	10	10	0	134	30
2	(New Zealand) Andrew Kelly	10	9	1	95	27
3	(India) Putul Sonowal	10	8	2	56	24
4	(Czech Republic) Craig Hurry	10	6	4	7	18
5	(Philippines) Rodel Labayo	10	5	5	34	15
6	(Norfolk Island) Trevor Gow	10	5	5	1	15
7	(Guernsey) Matt Solway	10	4	6	-1	12
8	(France) Amaury Dumont	10	4	6	-43	12
9	(Malta) Peter Tonna	10	3	7	-37	9
10	(Samoa) Avala Savaiinaea	10	1	9	-97	3
11	(Brazil) Renan Evangelisti	10	0	10	-149	0

=== Section 2 ===
Team	Player	P	W	L	Shots	Pts
1	(England) Sam Tolchard	10	10	0	110	30
2	(Canada) Ryan Bester	10	9	1	107	27
3	(Japan) Kenta Hasebe	10	8	2	69	24
4	(South Africa) Wayne Rittmuller	10	7	3	50	21
5	(Singapore) Anthony Loh Kee Sin	10	6	4	0	18
6	(Zimbabwe) Lionel Coventry	10	5	5	-26	15
7	(Botswana) Baven Balendra	10	4	^	-7	12
8	(Papua New Guinea) Manu Walo	10	3	7	-52	9
9	(Sweden) Olle Backgren	10	2	8	-63	6
10	(Cyprus) Loukas Paraskeva	10	1	9	-65	3
11	(Sri Lanka) Errol Mark Johnson	10	0	10	-123	0

=== Section 3 ===
Team	Player	P	W	D	L	Shots	Pts
1	(Malaysia) Izzat Dzulkeple	9	9	0	0	90	27
2	(Scotland) Iain McLean	9	8	0	1	80	24
3	(Jersey) Malcolm De Sousa	9	5	0	4	6	15
4	(Cook Islands) Royden Aperau	9	5	0	4	4	15
5	(United States) Charlie Herbert	9	4	0	5	10	12
6	(Thailand) Uthen Ontong	9	4	0	5	-5	12
7	(Namibia) Schalk Van Wyk	9	3	1	5	-26	10
8	(Switzerland) Markus Merz	9	3	0	6	-17	9
9	(Macau) Lam Su Hong	9	2	1	6	-45	7
10	(Falkland Islands) Gary Tyrrell	9	1	0	8	-97	3
11	(Kenya) Cephas Kimwaki Kimani	withdrew					

=== Section 4 ===
Team	Player	P	W	L	Shots	Pts
1	(Australia) Aaron Wilson	9	9	0	111	27
2	(Hong Kong) Tony Cheung	9	8	1	66	24
3	(Wales) Daniel Salmon	9	7	2	67	21
4	(Fiji) Kushal Pillay	9	6	3	38	18
5	(Israel) Tzvika Hadar	9	5	4	16	15
6	(Netherlands) Frank De Vries	9	4	5	0	12
7	(Argentina) Ricardo Rubinat	9	2	7	-58	6
8	(Spain) Terry Morgan	9	2	7	-60	6
9	(Niue) Stanley Tafatu	9	1	8	-69	3
10	(Turkey) Zafer Yaman	9	1	8	-111	3

== Finals ==
Play Offs
{ Ireland	21
Hong Kong	8
Australia	21
New Zealand	16
England	16
Scotland	21
Malaysia	14
Canada	21

Semifinals
{ Ireland	21
Australia	6
Scotland	14
Canada	21

Gold medal
{ Ireland	16
Canada	21

== Results ==
Men's singles section 1
Round 1 (4 Sep)		
New Zealand	Philippines	21–17
Ireland	Czech Republic	21–8
Brazil	India	2–21
Norfolk Island	France	21–13
Samoa	Guernsey	3–21
Round 2 (5 Sep)		
Norfolk Island	Samoa	21–11
France	India	5–21
Ireland	Brazil	21–2
New Zealand	Czech Republic	21–14
Philippines	Malta	21–8
Round 3 (5 Sep)		
Malta	Ireland	2–21
India	Philippines	21–18
Czech Republic	Norfolk Island	21–7
Guernsey	Brazil	21–7
France	Samoa	21–11
Round 4 (5 Sep)		
France	Guernsey	21–20
Brazil	Norfolk Island	5–21
India	Czech Republic	21–14
Philippines	Ireland	16–21
New Zealand	Malta	21–8
Round 5 (6 Sep)		
New Zealand	India	21–4
Norfolk Island	Malta	21–20
Philippines	Guernsey	10–21
Czech Republic	Samoa	21–16
Brazil	France	8–21
Round 6 (6 Sep)		
Samoa	Brazil	21–12
Czech Republic	Guernsey	31–21
Norfolk Island	Philippines	16–21
Malta	India	31–21
Ireland	New Zealand	21–14
Round 7 (6 Sep)		
Ireland	Norfolk Island	21–16
Guernsey	New Zealand	18–21
Samoa	Malta	12–21
France	Philippines	7–21
Czech Republic	Brazil	21–9
Round 8 (7 Sep)		
France	Czech Republic	20–21
Samoa	Philippines	7–21
Malta	Guernsey	21–17
Norfolk Island	New Zealand	8–21
India	Ireland	11–21
Round 9 (7 Sep)		
Guernsey	India	10–21
Samoa	Ireland	4–21
New Zealand	France	21–8
Malta	Brazil	21–9
Philippines	Czech Republic	15–21
Round 10 (7 Sep)		
Brazil	Philippines	4–21
France	Malta	21–17
New Zealand	Samoa	21–7
Guernsey	Ireland	1–21
Norfolk Island	India	11–21
Round 11 (8 Sep)		
Malta	Czech Republic	17–21
New Zealand	Brazil	21–3
Ireland	France	21–2
Samoa	India	12–21
Guernsey	Norfolk Island	8–21

Men's singles section 2
Round 1 (4 Sep)		
Canada	Sweden	21–6
Japan	Papua New Guinea	21–6
England	Singapore	21–10
South Africa	Botswana	21–16
Zimbabwe	Cyprus	21–16
Round 2 – 5 Sep)		
South Africa	Zimbabwe	21–13
Botswana	England	3–21
Japan	Singapore	21–8
Canada	Papua New Guinea	21–14
Sweden	Sri Lanka	21–8
Round 3 (5 Sep)		
Sri Lanka	Japan	7–21
England	Sweden	21–11
Papua New Guinea	South Africa	7–21
Cyprus	Singapore	18–21
Botswana	Zimbabwe	19–21
Round 4 (5 Sep)		
Botswana	Cyprus	21–13
Singapore	South Africa	14–21
England	Papua New Guinea	21–14
Sweden	Japan	4–21
Canada	Sri Lanka	21–2
Round 5 (6 Sep)		
Canada	England	17–21
South Africa	Sri Lanka	21–5
Sweden	Cyprus	21–18
Papua New Guinea	Zimbabwe	10–21
Singapore	Botswana	21–11
Round 6 (6 Sep)		
Zimbabwe	Singapore	9–21
Papua New Guinea	Cyprus	21–16
South Africa	Sweden	21–12
Sri Lanka	England	8–21
Japan	Canada	13–21
Round 7 (6 Sep)		
Japan	South Africa	21–14
Cyprus	Canada	3–21
Zimbabwe	Sri Lanka	21–12
Botswana	Sweden	21–7
Papua New Guinea	Singapore	19–21
Round 8 (7 Sep)		
Botswana	Papua New Guinea	21–11
Zimbabwe	Sweden	20–16
Sri Lanka	Cyprus	12–21
South Africa	Canada	17–21
England	Japan	21–8
Round 9 (7 Sep)		
Cyprus	England	8–21
Zimbabwe	Japan	10–21
Canada	Botswana	21–5
Sri Lanka	Singapore	14–21
Sweden	Papua New Guinea	20–21
Round 10 (7 Sep)		
Singapore	Sweden	21–12
Botswana	Sri Lanka	21–6
Canada	Zimbabwe	21–9
Cyprus	Japan	11–21
South Africa	England	14–21
Round 11 (8 Sep)		
Sri Lanka	Papua New Guinea	13–21
Canada	Singapore	21–9
Japan	Botswana	21–18
Zimbabwe	England	7–21
Cyprus	South Africa	12–21

Men's singles section 3
Round 1 (4 Sep)		
Scotland	Thailand	21–7
Malaysia	Falkland Islands	21–7
United States	Jersey	12–21
Namibia	Switzerland	21–16
Cook Islands	Macau	21–8
Round 2 (5 Sep)		
Namibia	Cook Islands	12–21
Switzerland	Jersey	12–21
Malaysia	United States	21–11
Scotland	Falkland Islands	21–11
Thailand	Kenya	+
Round 3 (5 Sep)		
Kenya	Malaysia	+
Jersey	Thailand	21–19
Falkland Islands	Namibia	21–18
Macau	United States	15–21
Switzerland	Cook Islands	21–13
Round 4 (5 Sep)		
Switzerland	Macau	17–21
United States	Namibia	14–21
Jersey	Falkland Islands	21–8
Thailand	Malaysia	9–21
Scotland	Kenya	+
'Round 5 (6 Sep)		
Scotland	Jersey	21–12
Namibia	Kenya	+
Thailand	Macau	21–17
Falkland Islands	Cook Islands	8–21
United States	Switzerland	21–11
Round 6 (6 Sep)		
Cook Islands	United States	7–21
Falkland Islands	Macau	11–21
Namibia	Thailand	9–21
Kenya	Jersey	+
Malaysia	Scotland	21–18
Round 7 (6 Sep)		
Malaysia	Namibia	21–12
Macau	Scotland	6–21
Cook Islands	Kenya	+
Switzerland	Thailand	21–16
Falkland Islands	United States	7–21
Round 8 (7 Sep)		
Switzerland	Falkland Islands	21–7
Cook Islands	Thailand	21–20
Kenya	Macau	+
Namibia	Scotland	12–21
Jersey	Malaysia	12–21
Round 9 (7 Sep)		
Macau	Jersey	17–21
Cook Islands	Malaysia	15–21
Scotland	Switzerland	21–15
Kenya	United States	+
Thailand	Falkland Islands	21–9
Round 10 (7 Sep)		
United States	Thailand	19–20
Switzerland	Kenya	+
Scotland	Cook Islands	21–8
Macau	Malaysia	4–21
Namibia	Jersey	21–17
Round 11 (8 Sep)		
Kenya	Falkland Islands	+
Scotland	United States	21–14
Malaysia	Switzerland	21–11
Cook Islands	Jersey	21–12
Macau	Namibia	20–20

Men's singles section 4
Round 1 (4 Sep)		
Australia	Turkey	21–4
Wales	Niue	21–10
Netherlands	Hong Kong	15–21
Spain	Argentina	11–21
Fiji	Israel	21–11
Round 2 (5 Sep)		
Argentina	Hong Kong	11–21
Wales	Netherlands	21–17
Niue	Australia	5–21
Turkey	Israel	5–21
Spain	Fiji	11–21
Round 3 (5 Sep)		
Israel	Wales	15–21
Hong Kong	Turkey	21–2
Niue	Spain	20–21
Argentina	Netherlands	20–21
Australia	Fiji	21–8
Round 4 (5 Sep)		
Netherlands	Spain	21–9
Hong Kong	Niue	21–7
Turkey	Wales	4–21
Australia	Israel	21–6
Fiji	Argentina	21–11
Round 5 (6 Sep)		
Australia	Hong Kong	21–19
Spain	Israel	20–21
Turkey	Argentina	19–21
Netherlands	Niue	21–15
Fiji	Wales	7–21
Round 6 (6 Sep)		
Argentina	Niue	16–21
Spain	Turkey	21–6
Israel	Hong Kong	16–21
Wales	Australia	12–21
Fiji	Netherlands	21–8
Round 7 (6 Sep)		
Wales	Spain	21–9
Argentina	Australia	3–21
Netherlands	Israel	12–21
Niue	Turkey	16–21
Hong Kong	Fiji	21–19
Round 8 (7 Sep)		
Netherlands	Turkey	21–7
Israel	Argentina	21–8
Spain	Australia	1–21
Hong Kong	Wales	21–20
Niue	Fiji	13–21
Round 9 (7 Sep)		
Israel	Niue	21–8
Australia	Netherlands	21–20
Argentina	Wales	8–21
Spain	Hong Kong	0–11
Fiji	Turkey	21–5

+forfeited
