= 1972 World Outdoor Bowls Championship =

Men's World Outdoor Championships 1972
- 2nd Men's World Outdoor Bowls Championships
- Location: Worthing, England
- Date: 5–17 June 1972
- Category: World Bowls Championship

The 1972 Men's World Outdoor Bowls Championship was held at Beach House Park in Worthing, England, from 5 to 17 June 1972.

Maldwyn Evans won the singles which was held in a round robin format. The pairs Gold was won by Hong Kong, the triples Gold by the United States and the fours Gold went to England. Scotland lifted the Leonard Trophy with just one point more than South Africa and the United States.

== Medallists ==
Event	Gold	Silver	Bronze
Men's singles	(Wales); Maldwyn Evans	(Scotland); Dick Bernard	(South Africa); Tommy Harvey
Men's pairs	(Hong Kong); Saco Delgado; Eric Liddell	(United States); Jim Candelet; Bill Tewksbury	(South Africa); Tommy Harvey; Brian Ellwood
Men's triples	(United States); Bill Miller; Clive Forrester; Dick Folkins	(South Africa); Edgar Davey; Joe Marsh; Doug Watson	(Wales); John Russell Evans; Hugh Andrews; Gareth Humphreys
Men's fours	(England); Norman King; Cliff Stroud; Ted Hayward; Peter Line	(Scotland); Rennie Logan; Alex McIntosh; Jock McAtee; Harry Reston	(Hong Kong); Saco Delgado; Abdul Kitchell; Roberto da Silva; Oscar Adem
Men's team	Scotland	South Africa	United States

== Results ==
=== Men's singles – round robin ===
Round	Tie 1	Tie 2	Tie 3	Tie 4	Tie 5	Tie 6	Tie 7	Tie 8
Round 1	Wal 21 Aus 18	Sco 21 Hkg 6	SAf 21 Fij 11	USA 21 Isr 3	Eng 21 Nzl 8	Ire 21 Jer 9	PNG 21 Gue 11	Mwi 21 Can 18
Round 2	Wal 13 USA 21	Sco 7 SAf 21	Aus 21 Isr 9	Eng 16 Hkg 21	Ire 9 Fij 21	Nzl 21 PNG 19	Mwi 21 Jer 16	Gue 21 Can 13
Round 3	Wal 21 Isr 10	Sco 21 Fij 11	SAf 21 Hkg 8	Aus 19 Ire 21	USA 21 Mwi 19	Eng 14 PNG 21	Nzl 21 Gue 8	Jer 20 Can 21
Round 4	Wal 21 PNG 19	Sco 21 Isr 15	SAf 21 Jer 11	Aus 21 USA 5	Eng 20 Mwi 21	Ire 21 Can 0	Nzl 19 Fij 21	Hkg 9 Gue 21
Round 5	Wal 21 Fij 14	Sco 21 Nzl 8	SAf 21 USA 13	Aus 21 Mwi 11	Eng 21 Gue 19	Ire 21 PNG 10	Hkg 21 Jer 11	Isr 21 Can 7
Round 6	Wal 21 Mwi 12	Sco 21 Can 10	SAf 18 PNG 21	Aus 21 Hkg 11	USA 21 Fij 18	Eng 21 Jer 7	Ire 15 Nzl 21	Isr 12 Gue 21
Round 7	Wal 21 Eng 6	Sco 21 Ire 11	SAf 19 Aus 21	USA 21 PNG 16	Nzl 21 Can 11	Gue 14 Jer 21	Hkg 21 Mwi 7	Fij 21 Isr 16
Round 8	Wal 21 Gue 7	Sco 21 PNG 16	SAf 18 Mwi 21	Aus 20 Fij 21	USA 21 Eng 19	Ire 19 Isr 21	Nzl 21 Jer 15	HKg 21 Can 8
Round 9	Wal 21 HKg 15	Sco 19 Mwi 21	SAf 21 Gue 10	Aus 21 Can 1	USA 12 Ire 21	Eng 21 Fij 2	Nzl 13 Isr 21	PNG 21 Jer 16
Round 10	Wal 25 Jer 12	Sco 21 USA 8	SAf 21 Isr 8	Aus 10 Eng 21	Ire 21 Gue 15	Nzl 21 Mwi 7	Hkg 21 Fij 10	PNG 21 Can 16
Round 11	Wal 21 SAf 17	Sco 18 Eng 21	Aus 21 Jer 10	USA 21 Nzl 14	Ire 21 Hkg 16	Can 17 Fij 21	Mwi 21 Gue 19	PNG 21 Isr 20
Round 12	Wal 21 Ire 18	Sco 21 Jer 4	SAf 21 Can 10	Aus 19 Nzl 21	USA 21 Gue 9	Eng 21 Isr 4	PNG 9 Hkg 21	Mwi 18 Fij 21
Round 13	Wal 21 Can 11	Sco 21 Gue 11	SAf 21 Nzl 18	Aus 21 PNG 15	USA 19 Hkg 21	Eng 21 Ire 20	Mwi 21 Isr 13	Fij 14 Jer 21
Round 14	Wal 12 Sco 21	Nzl 21 Hkg 12	SAf 21 Eng 17	Aus 21 Gue 19	USA 21 Can 15	Ire 21 Mwi 10	PNG 21 Fij 15	Isr 21 Jer 6
Round 15	Wal 12 Nzl 21	Sco 16 Aus 21	SAf 17 Ire 21	USA 21 Jer 20	Eng 21 Can 2	PNG 21 Mwi 17	Hkg 15 Isr 21	Fij 15 Gue 21

Pos	Player	P	W	L	F	A	Pts	Shots
1	(Wales) Maldwyn Evans	15	12	3	289	222	24	+67
2	(Scotland) Dick Bernard	15	11	4	291	196	22	+95
3	(South Africa) Tommy Harvey	15	10	5	299	218	20	+71
4	(Australia) Barry Salter	15	10	5	296	219	20	+77
5	(United States) Jim Candelet	15	10	5	267	251	20	+16
6	(England) David Bryant	15	9	6	281	216	18	+65
7	(Republic of Ireland) Roy Fulton	15	9	6	281	233	18	+48
8	(New Zealand) Bob McDonald	15	9	6	269	244	18	+25
9	(Papua New Guinea) Robert Henderson	15	8	7	272	274	16	-2
10	(Hong Kong) Eric Liddell	15	7	8	239	248	14	-9
11	(Malawi) Harry Lakin	15	7	8	246	291	14	-45
12	(Fiji) Syd Snowsill	15	6	9	236	288	12	-52
13	(Israel) Chunk Treisman	15	5	10	215	270	10	-55
14	(Guernsey) Don Ingrouille	15	4	11	226	280	8	-54
15	(Jersey) Ben Van Niekerk	15	2	13	198	301	4	-103
16	(Canada) Harry Figg	15	1	14	160	314	2	-154

=== Men's pairs – round robin ===
Round	Tie 1	Tie 2	Tie 3	Tie 4	Tie 5	Tie 6	Tie 7	Tie 8
Round 1	Ire 32 Jer 14	Eng 16 Nzl 15	SAf 30 Fij 7	Aus 24 Wal 15	USA 20 Isr 18	Mwi 26 Can 19	PNG 21 Gue 18	Sco 23 Hkg 19
Round 2	Can 28 Gue 14	Mwi 24 Jer 16	Hkg 23 Eng 21	Aus 25 Isr 18	USA 23 Wal 26	Fij 21 Ire 20	Sco 25 SAf 17	Nzl 20 PNG 16
Round 3	Jer 27 Can 11	Nzl 20 Gue 16	Ire 21 Aus 14	Wal 21 Isr 8	Eng 22 PNG 13	Hkg 23 SAf 18	Sco 24 Fij 16	USA 24 Mwi 20
Round 4	Ire 29 Can 19	Fij 20 Nzl 18	Mwi 24 Eng 19	Hkg 24 Gue 20	USA 24 Aus 21	Isr 21 Sco 8	PNG 25 Wal 13	SAf 40 Jer 9
Round 5	Fij 26 Wal 14	Jer 12 Hkg 30	Can 18 Isr 17	Eng 28 Gue 11	PNG 14 Ire 27	Nzl 19 Sco 26	Mwi 20 Aus 21	SAf 21 USA 15
Round 6	Eng 19 Jer 15	Isr 32 Gue 14	Ire 27 Nzl 19	Hkg 17 Aus 13	Can 21 Sco 14	Mwi 19 Wal 16	SAf 18 PNG 15	USA 27 Fij 15
Round 7	Gue 17 Jer 14	Sco 19 Ire 17	Hkg 30 Mwi 9	Fij 29 Isr 14	Eng 28 Wal 20	Nzl 29 Can 8	SAf 20 Aus 17	PNG 24 USA 12
Round 8	HKg 23 Can 20	Mwi 16 SAf 15	USA 25 Eng 5	Nzl 22 Jer 13	Aus 32 Fij 11	Wal 21 Gue 16	Isr 21 Ire 17	Sco 21 PNG 8
Round 9	HKg 16 Wal 14	Eng 23 Fij 12	Gue 20 SAf 16	Aus 30 Can 10	Sco 34 Mwi 10	Nzl 29 Isr 12	PNG 24 Jer 15	Ire 25 USA 16
Round 10	Hkg 33 Fij 6	Can 24 PNG 13	Nzl 31 Mwi 10	Eng 24 Aus 20	USA 23 Sco 11	Wal 25 Jer 10	SAf 27 Isr 14	Ire 18 Gue 13
Round 11	Aus 41 Jer 8	Can 27 Fij 17	SAf 37 Wal 19	Mwi 26 Gue 21	Sco 20 Eng 11	Hkg 24 Ire 15	Isr 21 PNG 28	USA 23 Nzl 18
Round 12	Hkg 36 PNG 11	Nzl 22 Aus 21	Fij 24 Mwi 15	SAf 25 Can 14	USA 22 Gue 10	Eng 26 Isr 14	Ire 28 Wal 18	Sco 32 Jer 17
Round 13	Hkg 13 USA 20	Aus 22 PNG 23	Can 8 Wal 28	SAf 12 Nzl 14	Isr 17 Mwi 20	Gue 17 Sco 15	Fij 21 Jer 15	Eng 26 Ire 16
Round 14	Nzl 26 Hkg 17	SAf 23 Eng 14	Gue 17 Aus 12	Sco 26 Wal 9	Isr 20 Jer 18	Can 31 USA 20	Mwi 18 Ire 18	PNG 21 Fij 17
Round 15	USA 31 Jer 12	Gue 14 Fij 14	SAf 26 Ire 18	Hkg 25 Isr 17	Wal 31 Nzl 10	Eng 21 Can 18	Aus 17 Sco 14	Mwi 20 PNG 18

Pos	Player	P	W	D	L	F	A	Pts	Shots
1	(Hong Kong) Saco Delgado & Eric Liddell	15	12	0	3	353	245	24	+108
2	(United States) Jim Candelet & Bill Tewksbury	15	11	0	4	325	250	22	+75
3	(South Africa) Tommy Harvey & Brian Ellwood	15	10	0	5	344	241	20	+103
4	(Scotland) Rennie Logan & Harry Reston	15	10	0	5	319	242	20	+77
5	(England) Norman King & Peter Line	15	10	0	5	302	272	20	+30
6	(New Zealand) Bob McDonald & Peter Kerry Clark	15	9	0	6	312	268	18	+44
7	(Republic of Ireland) Roy Fulton & Billy Tate	15	8	1	6	328	282	17	+46
8	(Malawi) Charles Slight & Stuart Flanders	15	8	1	6	277	323	17	-46
9	(Australia) Errol Bungey & Barry Salter	15	7	0	8	330	264	14	+66
10	(Fiji) Ram Harakh & Peter Underhill	15	6	1	8	256	327	13	-71
11	(Papua New Guinea) M Hutton & Oswald Dent	15	6	0	9	264	308	12	-44
12	(Canada) Bob Mackintosh & Jim Watkin	15	6	0	9	266	331	12	-65
13	(Wales) Maldwyn Evans & Leighton Jenkins	15	5	0	10	282	302	10	-20
14	(Israel) I Driman & Matt Gordon	15	5	0	10	264	320	10	-56
15	(Guernsey) Don Ingouille & Roy du Feu	15	4	1	10	238	311	9	-73
16	(Jersey) W Gorman & J Arthur	15	1	0	14	215	389	2	-174

=== Men's triples – round robin ===
Round	Tie 1	Tie 2	Tie 3	Tie 4	Tie 5	Tie 6	Tie 7	Tie 8
Round 1	SAf 24 Fij 9	Mwi 22 Can 12	PNG 21 Gue 14	Isr 13 USA 13	Jer 21 Ire 13	Hkg 16 Sco 12	Wal 25 Aus 11	Eng 16 Nzl 11
Round 2	Fij 23 Ire 14	Jer 21 Mwi 18	Wal 25 USA 14	Isr 13 Aus 19	Hkg 16 Eng 12	SAf 13 Sco 19	Nzl 10 PNG 20	Gue 15 Can 16
Round 3	USA 23 Mwi 10	Wal 26 Isr 13	Nzl 25 Gue 11	Aus 19 Ire 7	Eng 20 PNG 7	SAf 20 Hkg 16	Jer 27 Can 11	Fij 13 Sco 11
Round 4	Ire 23 Can 15	Nzl 22 Fij 15	Eng 19 Mwi 14	Hkg 30 Gue 11	Aus 21 USA 12	Sco 27 Isr 9	Wal 18 PNG 17	SAf 21 Jer 12
Round 5	Fij 27 Wal 12	Jer 11 Hkg 22	Can 25 Isr 13	Eng 34 Gue 8	PNG 9 Ire 25	Nzl 18 Sco 19	Mwi 17 Aus 15	SAf 15 USA 16
Round 6	Hkg 20 Aus 17	Isr 21 Gue 14	Wal 19 Mwi 13	USA 25 Fij 12	SAf 23 PNG 10	Ire 22 Nzl 11	Eng 19 Jer 11	Sco 25 Can 8
Round 7	Gue 14 Jer 8	Hkg 27 Mwi 13	USA 17 PNG 13	Ire 17 Sco 9	Isr 19 Fij 9	Eng 20 Wal 9	Nzl 12 Can 10	SAf 23 Aus 13
Round 8	Hkg 30 Can 5	SAf 20 Mwi 9	Nzl 17 Jer 13	Fij 19 Aus 17	Wal 24 Gue 9	USA 18 Eng 13	Isr 13 Ire 13	Sco 22 PNG 7
Round 9	Wal 15 Hkg 14	Eng 17 Fij 11	Aus 21 Can 15	USA 20 Ire 16	Nzl 19 Isr 16	SAf 18 Gue 15	PNG 20 Jer 15	Sco 21 Mwi 9
Round 10	Hkg 25 Fij 24	PNG 24 Can 7	Nzl 20 Mwi 9	Aus 23 Eng 20	USA 19 Sco 12	Wal 22 Jer 16	SAf 17 Isr 17	Ire 30 Gue 9
Round 11	Jer 16 Aus 15	Gue 22 Mwi 15	PNG 25 Isr 13	Fij 18 Can 16	SAf 24 Wal 7	Ire 17 Hkg 13	Sco 23 Eng 5	Nzl 15 USA 15
Round 12	PNG 23 Hkg 15	Nzl 18 Aus 10	Mwi 21 Fij 10	SAf 27 Can 8	USA 19 Gue 15	Isr 15 Eng 13	Wal 27 Wal 11	Sco 21 Jer 12
Round 13	Hkg 9 USA 20	Aus 22 PNG 11	Can 15 Wal 22	SAf 14 Nzl 15	Isr 14 Mwi 11	Gue 5 Sco 35	Fij 15 Jer 18	Eng 21 Ire 9
Round 14	Nzl 19 Hkg 13	Ire 19 Mwi 15	Aus 16 Gue 12	PNG 21 Fij 12	Isr 19 Jer 15	USA 16 Can 11	Wal 19 Sco 19	SAf 17 Eng 11
Round 15	Fij 22 Gue 7	USA 19 Jer 13	Eng 28 Can 10	Mwi 31 PNG 9	SAf 16 Ire 15	Sco 20 Aus 15	Hkg 24 Isr 21	Wal 20 Nzl 13

Pos	Player	P	W	D	L	F	A	Pts	Shots
1	(United States) Bill Miller, Clive Forrester & Dick Folkins	15	11	2	2	268	213	24	+45
2	(South Africa) Edgar Davey, Joe Marsh & Doug Watson	15	11	1	3	292	192	23	+100
3	(Wales) John Russell Evans, Hugh Andrews & Gareth Humphreys	15	11	1	3	290	236	23	+54
4	(Scotland) Dick Bernard, Alex McIntosh & Jock McAtee	15	10	1	4	295	185	21	+110
5	(New Zealand) Phil Skoglund, Bill MacAthur & Bruce Sinclair	15	9	1	5	251	223	19	+28
6	(England) Cliff Stroud, Ted Hayward & David Bryant	15	9	0	6	269	201	18	+68
7	(Hong Kong) Oscar Adem, Abdul Kitchell & Roberto da Silva	15	9	0	6	292	242	18	+50
8	(Papua New Guinea) Barry Welsh, Barrie Baxter & Robert Henderson	15	8	0	7	259	249	16	+10
9	(Republic of Ireland) Gerry Sloan, Tom Kennedy & Jimmy Dennison	15	7	1	7	251	241	15	+10
10	(Australia) Stan Coomber, Frank Perry & John Dobbie	15	7	0	8	251	249	14	+2
11	(Israel) Ben Krivy, Chunk Treisman & Harry Esakov	15	5	3	7	229	270	13	-41
12	(Fiji) Sydney Snowsill, Sean Patton & Gordon Maxwell	15	6	0	9	239	269	12	-30
13	(Jersey) Joe Dolan, Ben Van Niekerk & W Croft	15	5	0	10	220	271	10	-51
14	(Malawi) Harry Lakin, Peter Crossan & D de Grandhomme	15	3	0	12	220	271	6	-51
15	(Canada) Harry Figg, Sam Caffyn & Robert Leadbetter	15	2	0	13	196	320	4	-124
16	(Guernsey) Cyril Smith, George Hollings & Charlie Woodhard	15	2	0	13	181	334	4	-153

=== Men's fours – round robin ===
Round	Tie 1	Tie 2	Tie 3	Tie 4	Tie 5	Tie 6	Tie 7	Tie 8
Round 1	USA 24 Isr 23	PNG 25 Gue 16	Ire 19 Jer 12	Aus 18 Wal 16	Eng 25 Nzl 22	Fij 17 SAf 15	Can 18 Mwi 12	Hkg 29 Sco 28
Round 2	Ire 22 Fij 12	Mwi 23 Jer 17	Wal 24 USA 15	Aus 27 Isr 22	Hkg 24 Eng 17	Sco 27 SAf 10	Nzl 24 PNG 23	Can 25 Gue 16
Round 3	Jer 24 Can 17	Nzl 24 Gue 13	Ire 24 Aus 14	Sco 45 Fij 5	USA 19 Mwi 13	Wal 31 Isr 14	Eng 36 PNG 14	SAf 26 Hkg 15
Round 4	Aus 19 USA 13	Sco 30 Isr 13	SAf 40 Jer 6	Nzl 19 Fij 15	Hkg 33 Gue 12	PNG 21 Wal 17	Ire 27 Can 13	Eng 22 Mwi 12
Round 5	Wal 27 Fij 12	Hkg 20 Jer 14	Isr 31 Can 15	Eng 30 Gue 18	PNG 17 Ire 15	Sco 32 Nzl 18	Mwi 20 Aus 20	USA 17 SAf 16
Round 6	Isr 32 Gue 12	Ire 20 Nzl 16	Eng 39 Jer 10	Hkg 28 Aus 11	Can 16 Sco 14	USA 20 Fij 19	SAf 31 PNG 8	Mwi 26 Wal 19
Round 7	Aus 21 SAf 18	Jer 33 Gue 10	Ire 21 Sco 14	Mwi 17 Hkg 17	PNG 27 USA 17	Isr 23 Fij 19	Eng 20 Wal 18	Nzl 26 Can 12
Round 8	Hkg 25 Can 12	SAf 20 Mwi 10	Eng 24 USA 17	Ire 29 Isr 12	Sco 22 PNG 15	Nzl 34 Jer 13	Fij 24 Aus 18	Wal 36 Gue 13
Round 9	Eng 28 Fij 11	SAf 25 Gue 20	Aus 27 Can 19	PNG 24 Jer 13	Wal 37 Hkg 13	USA 19 Ire 18	Sco 26 Mwi 11	Nzl 23 Isr 16
Round 10	Hkg 18 Fij 17	Can 23 PNG 22	Nzl 32 Mwi 21	Eng 18 Aus 18	Sco 21 USA 17	Wal 32 Jer 12	Saf 33 Isr 16	Ire 27 Gue 12
Round 11	Aus 35 Jer 8	SAf 28 Wal 17	Gue 26 Mwi 19	USA 21 Nzl 15	Fij 22 Can 15	Ire 29 Hkg 10	PNG 27 Isr 18	Eng 23 Sco 22
Round 12	Nzl 24 Aus 13	Fij 21 Mwi 13	SAf 35 Can 8	USA 17 Gue 16	Ire 22 Wal 12	Sco 25 Jer 11	Hkg 25 PNG 11	Eng 21 Isr 12
Round 13	USA 25 Hkg 11	Aus 19 PNG 16	Wal 27 Can 11	Nzl 19 SAf 18	Sco 30 Gue 9	Fij 27 Jer 20	Eng 17 Ire 15	Isr 23 Mwi 18
Round 14	Mwi 30 Ire 13	Aus 20 Gue 19	Sco 35 Wal 9	Jer 21 Isr 11	USA 43 Can 7	Hkg 21 Nzl 19	Fij 21 PNG 13	Eng 30 SAf 17
Round 15	Fij 30 Gue 11	USA 31 Jer 14	Eng 22 Can 18	PNG 33 Mwi 12	SAf 33 Ire 23	Sco 23 Aus 14	Hkg 30 Isr 13	Wal 25 Nzl 20

Pos	Player	P	W	D	L	F	A	Pts	Shots
1	(England) Norman King, Cliff Stroud, Ted Hayward & Peter Line	15	13	1	1	372	254	27	+118
2	(Scotland) Rennie Logan, Alex McIntosh, Jock McAtee & Harry Reston	15	11	0	4	397	221	22	+176
3	(Hong Kong) Saco Delgado, Abdul Kitchell, Roberto da Silva & Oscar Adem	15	10	1	4	319	288	21	+31
4	(Republic of Ireland) Gerry Sloan, Tom Kennedy, Billy Tate & Jimmy Dennison	15	10	0	5	325	251	20	+74
5	(United States) Bill Miller, Clive Forrester, Dick Folkins & Bill Tewksbury	15	10	0	5	315	267	20	+48
6	(South Africa) Edgar Davey, Joe Marsh, Doug Watson & Brian Ellwood	15	9	0	6	365	254	18	+111
7	(New Zealand) Kerry Clark, Phil Skoglund, Bill MacArthur, Bruce Sinclair	15	9	0	6	336	287	18	+49
8	(Australia) Stan Coomber, Frank Perry, John Dobbie & Errol Bungey	15	9	0	6	294	292	18	+2
9	(Wales) John Russell Evans, Hugh Andrews, Gareth Humphreys & D Jenkins	15	8	0	7	347	280	16	+67
10	(Papua New Guinea) Barry Welsh, Barrie Baxter, M Hutton & Oswald Dent	15	7	0	8	296	309	14	-13
11	(Fiji) Ram Harakh, Peter Underhill, Sean Patton & Gordon Maxwell	15	7	0	8	279	307	14	-28
12	(Malawi) C Slight, Stuart Flanders, Peter Crossan & D de Grandhomme	15	3	2	10	263	331	8	-68
13	(Israel) Ben Krivy, I Driman, Matt Gordon & Harry Esakov	15	4	0	11	279	360	8	-81
14	(Canada) Bob Mackintosh, Jim Watkin, Sam Caffyn & Robert Leadbetter	15	4	0	11	229	373	8	-144
15	(Jersey) Joe Dolan, W Croft, W Gorman & J Arthur	15	3	0	12	228	387	6	-159
16	(Guernsey) Cyril Smith, George Hollings, Charlie Woodhard & Roy du Feu	15	1	0	14	223	406	2	-183

=== W. M. Leonard Trophy ===
Pos	Team	Singles	Pairs	Triples	Fours	Total
1	Scotland	3	1	1	3	8
2	South Africa	2	2	3	0	7
3	United States	0	3	4	3	7
4	Hong Kong	0	4	0	2	6
5	Wales	4	0	2	0	6
6	England	0	0	0	4	4
7	(Republic of Ireland) Ireland	0	0	0	1	1
8	Australia	1	0	0	0	1
