= Joe Marsh (bowls) =

South African lawn bowler (1928–2025)

Personal information
- Nationality: South Africa
- Born: 1928
- Died: January 2025 (aged 96–97)

Sport
- Sport: Lawn bowls
Medal record
Representing (South Africa)
World Outdoor Championships
Silver medal – second place	1972 Worthing	triples
Silver medal – second place	1972 Worthing	team

Joe A. Marsh (1928 – January 2025) was a South African international lawn bowler.

== Bowls career ==
Marsh was the Transvaal and Southern Transvaal bowls champion and was the South African National Bowls Championships runner-up in 1970.

He won a silver medal in the triples at the 1972 World Outdoor Bowls Championship in Worthing with Edgar Davey and Doug Watson. He also won a silver medal in the team event (Leonard Trophy).

== Personal life and death ==
Marsh was a gold refining official by trade and took up bowls in 1948. Marsh died in January 2025.
