= Edgar Davey =

South African international lawn bowler

Personal information
- Nationality: South Africa
- Born: 1927
- Died: March 2012 (aged 84–85)

Sport
- Club: Florida, Western Transvaal
Medal record
Representing (South Africa)
World Outdoor Championships
Silver medal – second place	1972 Worthing	triples
Silver medal – second place	1972 Worthing	team

Edgar L Davey (1927-2012), was a South African international lawn bowler.

== Bowls career ==
He won a silver medal in the triples at the 1972 World Outdoor Bowls Championship in Worthing with Joe Marsh and Doug Watson. He also won a silver medal in the team event (Leonard Trophy).

He was the 1971 South African National Bowls Championships singles winner bowling for Florida BC, Western Transvaal.

== Personal life ==
He was a sales representative by trade and took up bowls in 1948.
