= Grant Logan =

Scottish lawn bowler

Personal information
- Nationality: British (Scottish)
- Born: 1976

Sport
- Sport: Lawn bowls
- Club: Kirkliston BC
Medal record
Representing Scotland
Atlantic Bowls Championships
Gold medal – first place	2011 Paphos	fours
Bronze medal – third place	2011 Paphos	pairs

Grant Logan (born 1976) is a Scottish international lawn bowler.

== Biography ==
Logan born in 1976, became the youngest WLBA champion of champions when he won the 1993 event as a 16-year-old.

He won the fours gold medal and pairs bronze medal at the 2011 Atlantic Bowls Championships.

His father Gordon Logan, played in the English Football League for Port Vale. and his grandfather Rennie Logan won a silver medal at the 1972 World Outdoor Bowls Championship.
