= David Hull =

David Hull may refer to:

- Dave Hull (1934–2020), American radio personality
- David Hull (actor) (born 1985), American actor and singer
- David Hull (bowls) (born 1944), Northern Irish bowler
- David Hull (musician), American musician
- David Hull (paediatrician) (1932–2021), British paediatrician
- David Hull (philosopher) (1935–2010), American philosopher
- David Hull (rugby league) (born 1951), English rugby league footballer
- David Carlisle Hull (1869–1928), American academic administrator
- David P. Hull (1817–?), American politician
- David Wayne Hull (born c. 1962), American Ku Klux Klan leader
