= Gordon Logan =

Scottish footballer (born 1949)

Personal information
- Full name: Gordon Taylor Logan
- Date of birth: 3 October 1949 (age 77)
- Place of birth: Kirkliston, Scotland
- Height: 6 ft 0 in (1.83 m)
- Position: Right-back

Youth career
- Tynecastle Athletic
- 1966–1967: Port Vale

Senior career*
Years	Team	Apps	(Gls)
1967–1970	Port Vale	35	(1)
1970–1971	Kettering Town		
1971–19??	Bo'ness United		

International career
	Scotland Youth	3	(0)
- * Club domestic league appearances and goals

Gordon Taylor Logan (born 3 October 1949) is a Scottish former footballer who played at right-back for Port Vale, Kettering Town and Bo'ness United. He helped Port Vale to win promotion out of the Fourth Division in 1969–70. His father was the footballer Rennie Logan, and his son, Grant Logan, played lawn bowls.

== Career ==
The son of former Hibernian and Falkirk footballer Rennie Logan, Logan attended Broxburn High School, played for Tynecastle Athletic and captained the county schools team to the final of the Scottish Schools' Cup. At the age of 16, he was signed to the Port Vale junior team by manager Stanley Matthews in June 1966. He captained the "Valiants" reserve team and played in the team that reached the FA Youth Cup quarter finals. He also won three caps for Scotland youth. He signed professional forms with the club in March 1967. He played seven Fourth Division games towards the end of the 1966–67 season. He played 17 matches in the 1967–68 campaign, though Matthews came into trouble when it was revealed that Logan had been paid illegal bonuses. He featured just four times in the 1968–69 season, as he fell out of favour under new boss Gordon Lee. Logan played nine league and five FA Cup games in the 1969–70 promotion campaign, and scored his first senior goal on 13 September, in a 3–2 win over Oldham Athletic at Boundary Park. He was given a free transfer to Southern League side Kettering Town in May 1970. He returned to Scotland to become a police officer in the summer of 1971. Also, he signed for SJFA side Bo'ness United, featuring regularly as a right-back for a team that reached the finals of the Brown Cup & R L Rae Cup that season.

== Family ==
His father, Rennie Logan, and his son, Grant Logan, both represented Scotland at lawn bowls.

== Career statistics ==
Appearances and goals by club, season and competition
Club	Season	League			FA Cup		League Cup		Total	
Club	Season	Division	Apps	Goals	Apps	Goals	Apps	Goals	Apps	Goals
Port Vale	1966–67	Fourth Division	7	0	0	0	0	0	7	0
Port Vale	1967–68	Fourth Division	15	0	0	0	2	0	17	0
Port Vale	1968–69	Fourth Division	4	0	0	0	0	0	4	0
Port Vale	1969–70	Fourth Division	9	1	5	0	0	0	14	1
Port Vale	Total		35	1	5	0	2	0	42	1

== Honours ==
Port Vale

- Football League Fourth Division fourth-place promotion: 1969–70
