= Jimmy Dennison =

Northern Irish international lawn bowler

Personal information
- Nationality: Northern Irish

Sport
- Sport: Lawn bowls
- Club: Banbridge BC
Medal record
Representing combined Ireland
British Isles Championships
Gold medal – first place	1968	fours
Representing Northern Ireland
Irish Nationals
Gold medal – first place	1967	fours

James "Jimmy" Dennison is a former international lawn bowler from Northern Ireland who competed at the Commonwealth Games.

== Biography ==
Dennison was a member of the Banbridge Bowls Club and made his international debut in 1959.

In 1967 he was part of the four that won the Irish National Bowls Championships and subsequently qualified to represent Ireland at the British Isles Bowls Championships, where they won the triples title.

He represented Ireland at the 1972 World Outdoor Bowls Championship in the triples and fours.

Dennison represented the Northern Irish team at the 1974 British Commonwealth Games in Christchurch, New Zealand, where he competed in the fours event, with Gerry Sloan, Jim Craig and Jimmy Donnelly.

Dennison earned his 50th cap in 1976 and went on to earn 60 caps in total.
