= Bill Irish =

English international lawn and indoor bowler

Personal information
- Nationality: British (English)
- Born: 10 May 1932 Bromsgrove, Worcestershire
- Died: 27 April 1992 (aged 59) Worcester, Worcestershire

Sport
- Club: Vines Park, Droitwich
Medal record
Representing (England)
World Outdoor Championships
Silver medal – second place	1976 Johannesburg	triples
Bronze medal – third place	1976 Johannesburg	fours
Silver medal – second place	1976 Johannesburg	team
British Isles Championships
Gold medal – first place	1975	singles

William 'Bill' Crane Irish (10 May 1932 – 27 April 1992), was an England international lawn and indoor bowler.

== Bowls career ==
=== World Championships ===
He won a silver medal in the triples and bronze medal in the fours with John C Evans, Tommy Armstrong and Peter Line at the 1976 World Outdoor Bowls Championship in Johannesburg. He also won a silver medal in the team event (Leonard Cup).

=== Commonwealth Games ===
He represented England in the fours, at the 1978 Commonwealth Games in Edmonton, Alberta, Canada.

=== National ===
He won the 1967 and 1974 singles title at the national titles and also won the singles at the British Isles Bowls Championships in 1975.
