= Gerry Sloan =

Northern Irish international lawn bowler

Personal information
- Nationality: Northern Irish

Sport
- Sport: Lawn bowls
- Club: Bangor BC

Gerard "Gerry" Sloan is a former international lawn bowler from Northern Ireland who competed at the Commonwealth Games.

== Biography ==
Sloan was a member of the Bangor Bowls Club, although he originally bowled for Ballynafeigh in Belfast, when he reached the singles semi finals of the 1960 Irish National Bowls Championships.

He represented Ireland at the 1972 World Outdoor Bowls Championship.

Sloan represented the Northern Irish team at the 1974 British Commonwealth Games in Christchurch, New Zealand, where he competed in the fours event, with Jim Craig, Jimmy Donnelly and Jimmy Dennison.

He continued to represent Ireland up until 1980.
