= Brian Ellwood =

South African international lawn bowler

Personal information
- Nationality: South Africa
- Born: 1925
- Died: 2007 (aged 81–82)

Sport
- Sport: Lawn bowls
- Club: Berea Park BC
Medal record
Representing South Africa
World Outdoor Championships
Bronze medal – third place	1972 Worthing	pairs
Silver medal – second place	1972 Worthing	team

Brian Gill Ellwood (1925–2007), was a South African international lawn bowler.

== Bowls career ==
He won a bronze medal in the pairs with Tommy Harvey at the 1972 World Outdoor Bowls Championship in Worthing. He also won a silver medal in the team event (Leonard Trophy).

He won the 1967 singles title at the South African National Bowls Championships when bowling for the Berea Park Bowls Club. In addition he won the Transvaal singles twice and the Northern Transvaal singles five times.

== Personal life ==
He was a bank inspector by trade in addition to being a competent tennis and cricket player.
