= Jimmy Donnelly (bowls) =

Northern Irish lawn bowler (1928–1980)

Personal information
- Nationality: British (Northern Irish)
- Born: 11 April 1928 Belfast, Northern Ireland
- Died: 21 February 1980 (aged 51)

Sport
- Sport: Lawn bowls
- Club: Falls BC
Medal record
Representing Northern Ireland
Commonwealth Games
Bronze medal – third place	1970 Edinburgh	pairs
World Indoor Bowls Championships
Silver medal – second place	1979 Coatbridge	singles
Representing combined Ireland
British Isles Championships
Gold medal – first place	1969	triples

James "Jimmy" J. Donnelly (11 April 1928 – 21 February 1980) was an Irish international lawn bowler.

== Biography ==
A teacher by trade, Donnelly represented Northern Ireland at three Commonwealth Games and his best achievement was winning a bronze medal in the pairs at the 1970 British Commonwealth Games in Edinburgh with Syd Thompson. He also represented the Northern Irish team at the 1974 British Commonwealth Games in Christchurch, New Zealand, where he competed in the fours event, with Gerry Sloan, Jim Craig and Jimmy Dennison.

He won the 1979 pairs title and 1968 fours title at the Irish National Bowls Championships when bowling for the Falls Bowls Club. In addition he has won five National indoor titles and was Ireland's bowler of the year in 1965.

Donnelly made his international debut in 1965 and was the 1976 Private Greens League singles champion. In 1979 he was the runner-up in the 1979 World Indoor Bowls Championship, losing out to the legendary David Bryant.

Donnelly died on 21 Febnruary 1980 at the age of 51 when he suffered a heart attack. He drove himself to hospital after chest pains.

== Legacy ==
The 'Jimmy Donnelly Trophy', an award given to Ireland's best bowler at the annual British Isles International series is named after him. He was a mentor to Jim Baker.
