= Bob Middleton (bowls) =

Australian lawn bowler

Robert 'Bob' Middleton
Personal information
- Nationality: Australia
- Born: 1935 (age 90–91)
Medal record
Representing Australia
World Outdoor Championships
Silver medal – second place	1976 Johannesburg	Men's singles
Bronze medal – third place	1976 Johannesburg	Men's pairs
Bronze medal – third place	1976 Johannesburg	Men's team
Bronze medal – third place	1984 Aberdeen	Men's pairs

Robert 'Bob' Middleton is a former Australian international lawn bowler.

== Bowls career ==
=== World Championships ===
Middleton won a singles silver medal, a pairs bronze medal with Don Woolnough and a team bronze at the 1976 World Outdoor Bowls Championship in Johannesburg and eight years later won a bronze medal in the 1984 World Outdoor Championships in Aberdeen with bowls partner Kenny Williams.

=== Club ===
He was fourteen times Mitcham club champion and was a sale agent by trade.

=== Awards ===
He was inducted into the Australian Hall of Fame.
