= Clive White (bowls) =

Australian lawn bowler

Personal information
- Nationality: Australia
- Born: 30 May 1928
Medal record
Representing Australia
Commonwealth Games
Silver medal – second place	1974 Christchurch	singles

Clive White (born 1928) is a former Australian international lawn bowler.

He won a silver medal in the singles at the 1974 British Commonwealth Games in Christchurch.

He was the 1972 Australian champion winning the singles at the Australian National Bowls Championships.
