= Keith Poole (bowls) =

Australian international lawn bowler

Personal information
- Nationality: Australian
- Born: 24 April 1927
- Died: 15 September 2012 (aged 85)
Medal record
Representing Australia
World Outdoor Championships
Silver medal – second place	1976 Johannesburg	Men's fours
Bronze medal – third place	1976 Johannesburg	Men's team
Silver medal – second place	1980 Melbourne	Men's team
Commonwealth Games
Silver medal – second place	1974 Christchurch	Men's fours
Gold medal – first place	1982 Brisbane	Men's fours
Asia Pacific Bowls Championships
Gold medal – first place	1985 Tweed Heads	fours

Keith Poole (24 April 1927 – 15 September 2012) was an Australian international lawn bowler.

== Bowls career ==
=== World Championships ===
Poole won a silver medal in the fours with Don Woolnough, Leigh Bishop and Barry Salter and a bronze medal in the team event (Leonard Cup) at the 1976 World Outdoor Bowls Championship in Johannesburg. He also won a silver medal in the team event four years later.

=== Commonwealth Games ===
Poole won a silver medal as part of the fours team with Robert King, Errol Bungey and Errol Stewart at the 1974 British Commonwealth Games in Christchurch, New Zealand. Eight years later he represented Australia at the 1982 Commonwealth Games and skipped the four to a gold medal success in the 1982 Commonwealth Games in Brisbane. The gold medal winning team was Poole, Rob Dobbins, Bert Sharp and Don Sherman.

=== Asia Pacific Championships ===
He won a gold medal at the Asia Pacific Bowls Championships in the 1985 fours at Tweed Heads, New South Wales.

=== Personal life ===
He was an accountant by trade and was inducted into the Australian Hall of Fame. He died in 2012.
