= Tommy Armstrong (bowls) =

English international lawn and indoor bowler

Personal information
- Nationality: British (English)
- Born: 1939 (age 86–87) Penrith, Cumbria, England

Sport
- Club: Penrith Castle Park BC
Medal record
Representing (England)
World Outdoor Championships
Silver medal – second place	1976 Johannesburg	triples
Bronze medal – third place	1976 Johannesburg	fours
Silver medal – second place	1976 Johannesburg	team
British Isles Championships
Gold medal – first place	1974	pairs

Tommy Armstrong (born 1939) is a former England international lawn and indoor bowler.

== Bowls career ==
=== World Championships ===
Armstrong won a silver medal in the triples and a bronze medal in the fours with John C Evans, Bill Irish and Peter Line at the 1976 World Outdoor Bowls Championship in Johannesburg. He also won a silver medal in the team event (the Leonard Trophy).

=== Commonwealth Games ===
He represented England at the 1982 Commonwealth Games in the fours, at the 1982 Commonwealth Games in Brisbane, Queensland, Australia.

=== National ===
He has won the 1973 pairs national title with Ronald Milburn, when bowling for the Penrith Castle Park BC at the national title.
