= Ted Hayward =

English lawn bowls player (1924–2022)

Personal information
- Nationality: British (English)
- Born: 26 September 1924 London, England
- Died: 28 October 2022 (aged 98) Worthing, England

Sport
- Sport: Lawn & indoor bowls
- Club: Paddington BC
Medal record
Representing (England)
World Outdoor Championships
| Gold medal – first place | 1972 Worthing | fours |

Edward "Ted" Henry Hayward (26 September 1924 – 28 October 2022) was an England international lawn bowler.

== Life and career ==
Hayward was born in London on 26 September 1924. A works foreman by trade, he first played bowls in Hyde Park during 1961 before becoming the Middlesex champion. His brothers Stan and George were both significant bowlers. Originally he bowled for Maida Vale BC before joining Paddington BC in 1966. He made his international debut for England in 1967.

Hayward won a gold medal in the fours with Norman King, Cliff Stroud and Peter Line at the 1972 World Outdoor Bowls Championship in Worthing. He competed in the fours event at the Lawn bowls at the 1974 British Commonwealth Games finishing in fifth place.

In 1977, he joined Shadwell BC before moving to Century BC in Wembley, where he was working in a carburettor factory in Stanmore. At county level he played 84 times for Middlesex before moving to Sussex in 1988.

== Personal life and death ==
Hayward lived in Worthing, West Sussex.

Hayward died in Worthing on 28 October 2022, at the age of 98.
