= Kevin Campbell (bowls) =

South African lawn bowler (born 1950)

Personal information
- Nationality: South Africa
- Born: 24 December 1950 (age 75)

Sport
- Sport: Lawn bowls
Medal record
Representing South Africa
World Outdoor Championships
Gold medal – first place	1976 Johannesburg	triples
Gold medal – first place	1976 Johannesburg	fours
Gold medal – first place	1976 Johannesburg	team
Silver medal – second place	1992 Worthing	triples
Bronze medal – third place	1992 Worthing	fours
Bronze medal – third place	1996 Adelaide	triples
Commonwealth Games
Silver medal – second place	2002 Manchester	fours

Kevin Arthur Hugh Campbell (born 24 December 1950) is a former South African international lawn bowler.

== Bowls career ==
=== World Championships ===
Campbell came to prominence in 1976 when he won the triples, fours and team gold medals at the 1976 World Outdoor Bowls Championship in Johannesburg. In the Triples with Nando Gatti and Kelvin Lightfoot they won 14 of their 15 matches. In the fours with Gatti, Lightfoot and Bill Moseley they repeated the feat of winning 14 of the 15 matches played.

The South African team completed a clean sweep of all events at the 1976 World Outdoor Bowls Championship. The lawn bowlers from South Africa were denied further opportunities to win medals due to the Sporting boycott of South Africa during the apartheid era.

Sixteen years later he won the triples silver medal and fours bronze medal at the 1992 World Outdoor Bowls Championship in Worthing followed by another bronze at the 1996 World Outdoor Bowls Championship in Adelaide.

=== Commonwealth Games ===
He also won a silver at the 2002 Commonwealth Games in Manchester.

=== National ===
Campbell became the youngest ever Springbok international aged 24 and his mother and father both won South African National Bowls Championships.
