= Bob King (bowls) =

Australian lawn bowler (1934–2022)

Robert King
Personal information
- Nationality: Australian
- Born: 4 September 1934
- Died: 2022 (aged 87–88)
Medal record
Representing Australia
Commonwealth Games
Silver medal – second place	1974 Christchurch	fours

Robert King (4 September 1934 – June/July 2022) was an Australian international lawn bowler.

King was a member of the Bomaderry Bowling Club who won two major Australian titles – Australian Pairs (1985) and the Australian Singles (1998). New South Wales titles included – Singles (1979, 1980, 1984, 1993 and 1998), Pairs (1979 and 1980), the State Champion of Champions singles (1984 and 1994) and the State Open Pairs (1968).

King won a silver medal in the fours with Errol Bungey, Errol Stewart and Keith Poole at the 1974 British Commonwealth Games in Christchurch.

He was inducted into the Bowls NSW Hall of Fame in 2007 and Bowls Australia Hall of Fame in 2015.
