= Myra Wood =

Personal information
- Nationality: American

Sport
- Club: Tacoma BC; Sun City BC
Medal record
Representing United States
Asia Pacific Bowls Championships
Silver medal – second place	2015 Christchurch	fours

Myra Wood is a lawn bowls international from the United States.

== Biography ==
Wood began bowling in 1986 and represented the United States from 1994 to 2015. She won a fours silver medal (with Janice Bell, Anne Nunes and Candy DeFazio) at the 2015 Asia Pacific Bowls Championships in Christchurch, New Zealand.

In 2017, she was inducted into the United States Bowls Hall of Fame. This was the same year in which she won the USA National pairs title with Lorriane Hitchcock.
