= Peter Line (bowls) =

English lawn and indoor bowler (1930–2025)

Personal information
- Nationality: British (English)
- Born: 13 October 1930 Southampton, Hampshire, England
- Died: 17 February 2025 (aged 94)

Sport
- Sport: Lawn bowls
- Club: Banister Park BC; Atherley BC
Medal record
Representing England
World Outdoor Championships
Gold medal – first place	1972 Worthing	fours
Bronze medal – third place	1976 Johannesburg	fours
Silver medal – second place	1976 Johannesburg	team
Commonwealth Games
Gold medal – first place	1970 Edinburgh	pairs
Silver medal – second place	1974 Christchurch	pairs

Peter Line (13 October 1930 – 17 February 2025) was an English international lawn and indoor bowler.

== Bowls career ==
=== World Championships ===
Line won the fours gold medal with Norman King, Cliff Stroud and Ted Hayward at the 1972 World Outdoor Bowls Championship in Worthing. Four years later, he won two more medals: a bronze medal in the fours with John C Evans, Bill Irish and Tommy Armstrong and a silver medal in the team event (Leonard Cup).

=== Commonwealth Games ===
Line won the gold medal in the pairs with Norman King during the 1970 British Commonwealth Games and four years later won a silver medal with John Evans in the 1974 British Commonwealth Games.

=== National ===
Line bowled for the Banister Park Bowls Club in Southampton, Hampshire and won the national singles title in 1961 and 1964. In 1999, bowling for the Atherley Club, he won the national senior singles.

Line first played for England in 1955.

== Personal life and death ==
In 1984, he married fellow England international, Wendy Line (née Clarke). By trade, Line was a civil service cartographical draughtsman and joined the Banister Park Bowls Club in 1948. He died on 17 February 2025, aged 94.
