= Don Woolnough =

Australian lawn bowler

Personal information
- Nationality: Australia
- Born: 13 June 1920
- Died: 2003

Sport
- Club: Victoria
Medal record
Representing (Australia)
World Outdoor Championships
Silver medal – second place	1976 Johannesburg	fours
Bronze medal – third place	1976 Johannesburg	pairs
Bronze medal – third place	1976 Johannesburg	team

Donald Adrian Woolnough OAM (1920–2003) was an Australian international lawn bowler.

== Bowls career ==
=== World Championships ===
Woolnough won a silver medal in the fours with Leigh Bishop, Barry Salter and Keith Poole, a bronze medal in the pairs with Bob Middleton and a bronze medal in the team event (Leonard Cup) at the 1976 World Outdoor Bowls Championship in Johannesburg.

=== Coaching ===
He coached the 1990 Commonwealth Games Australian bowls team.

=== Awards ===
Woolnough was awarded the Medal of the Order of Australia in the 1995 Australia Day Honours for "service to lawn bowls" and the Australian Sports Medal in 2000. He died in 2003 and was posthumously inducted into the Australian Hall of Fame in 2015.
