= Morgan Moffat =

Scottish-born New Zealand lawn and indoor bowler

Personal information
- Born: 22 January 1943 Scotland
- Died: 13 March 1992 (aged 49) Christchurch, New Zealand

Sport
- Sport: Lawn bowls
- Club: Grange BC; Linwood BC
Medal record
Men's lawn bowls
Representing Scotland
British Commonwealth Games
| Bronze medal – third place | 1974 Christchurch | Fours |
Representing New Zealand
Commonwealth Games
| Silver medal – second place | 1978 Edmonton | Fours |
| Silver medal – second place | 1982 Brisbane | Fours |
World Outdoor Championships
| Gold medal – first place | 1988 Auckland | Triples |
| Silver medal – second place | 1984 Aberdeen | Fours |
| Silver medal – second place | 1984 Aberdeen | Team |
| Silver medal – second place | 1988 Auckland | Fours |
| Silver medal – second place | 1988 Auckland | Team |
| Bronze medal – third place | 1980 Melbourne | Triples |
| Bronze medal – third place | 1980 Melbourne | Fours |
| Bronze medal – third place | 1984 Aberdeen | Triples |

David "Morgan" Moffat (22 January 1943 – 13 March 1992) was a Scottish-born New Zealand lawn and indoor bowler, who won medals representing both Scotland and New Zealand at the Commonwealth Games.

== Bowls career ==
Moffat was born in Scotland and was a member of the Grange Bowls Club. He represented the Scottish team at the 1974 British Commonwealth Games in Christchurch, New Zealand, where he competed in the fours event, with John McRae, Bill Scott and John Marshall and won a bronze medal.

He emigrated the following year to New Zealand. He won another bronze in both the triples and fours in the 1980 World Outdoor Bowls Championship, but this time for New Zealand. The success continued as he won bronze in the triples and silver in the fours during the 1984 World Outdoor Bowls Championship. Moffat also secured a fours silver in Edmonton during the 1978 Commonwealth Games and a fours silver in the 1982 Commonwealth Games.

A gold medal finally came in 1988 when he won the triples at the 1988 World Outdoor Bowls Championship in Auckland.

He won the 1978 fours title at the New Zealand National Bowls Championships when bowling for the Linwood Bowls Club.

Moffat died on 13 March 1992.

== Awards ==
In 2013, Moffat was an inaugural inductee into the Bowls New Zealand Hall of Fame.
