= Nando Gatti =

Personal information
- Nationality: South Africa
- Born: 1927
- Died: Unknown

Sport
- Sport: Lawn bowls
Medal record
Representing South Africa
World Outdoor Championships
Gold medal – first place	1976 Johannesburg	triples
Gold medal – first place	1976 Johannesburg	fours
Gold medal – first place	1976 Johannesburg	team

Nando Gatti (1927-date of death unknown) was a former South African international lawn bowler.

== Bowls career ==
=== World championships ===
Gatti came to prominence in 1976 when he won the triples, fours and team gold medal at the 1976 World Outdoor Bowls Championship in Johannesburg. In the Triples with Kevin Campbell and Kelvin Lightfoot they won 14 of their 15 matches. In the fours with Campbell, Lightfoot and Bill Moseley they repeated the feat of winning 14 of the 15 matches played.

The South African team completed a clean sweep of all events at the 1976 World Outdoor Bowls Championship. The lawn bowlers from South Africa were denied further opportunities to win medals due to the Sporting boycott of South Africa during the apartheid era.

=== National ===
Gatti won 13 gold medals at the sport of Bocce in Italy before emigrating to South Africa. He became a South African citizen in 1969, and in 1975 he won the South African National Bowls Championships fours.
