= Cliff Stroud =

English lawn bowler

Personal information
- Nationality: British (English)
- Born: 7 November 1920 Tottenham, London, England
- Died: 23 April 2015 (aged 94)

Sport
- Club: Trowbridge Westbourne BC
Medal record
Representing England
World Outdoor Championships
Gold medal – first place	1972 Worthing	men's fours

Cliff R. Stroud (7 November 1920 – 23 April 2015) was an English international lawn and indoor bowler.

== Bowls career ==
Stroud started bowling in 1954 for the Trowbridge Westbourne club in Wiltshire (outdoors) and the Christie Miller club (indoors).

He was an England international from 1967 to 1972 and won the gold medal in the fours at the 1972 World Outdoor Bowls Championship with Peter Line, Ted Hayward and Norman King.

He also represented England at the 1970 British Commonwealth Games in the fours event.

== Personal life ==
He took up bowls aged 12 for the Tottenham Somerford BC. Stroud was a company director and general manager by trade and in 2015.

Stroud died in April 2015 at the age of 94.
