= Bowls USA =

Governing body for the sport of lawn bowls in the United States

- Sport: Bowls
- Jurisdiction: United States
- Abbreviation: BUSA
- Founded: 1915
- Affiliation: World Bowls
- Location: Covina, California, U.S.
- President: Veronica Sum
- Secretary: Pam Edwards

Official website
- www.bowlsusa.us
- (United States)

Bowls USA is the governing body for the sport of bowls in the United States. The organization is responsible for the promotion and development of lawn bowls in the United States, and is affiliated with the world governing body World Bowls.

The organization arranges tournaments such as men's and women's United States National Bowls Championships, with competition in the bowls disciplines of singles and pairs. There are seven defined regions with over 2,800 members in clubs across the USA. The divisions are known as Northwest, Pacific Inter-Mountain, Southwest, South Central, Central, Northeast and Southeast

== History ==
Bowls in the United States was believed to have been in existence in Massachusetts and Connecticut as early as the mid-17th century. The sport in the United States probably originated from early settlers from the United Kingdom. A green was laid in 1732 by Augustine Washington, the father of George Washington, at the family estate on Mount Vernon. Another green existed at Battery Park until 1820 and was the name origin of the public park Bowling Green (New York City).

Clubs existed long before the American Lawn Bowling Association (ALBA) was created in Buffalo, New York, on July 27, 1915. A world tournament was held during the 1932 Summer Olympics and another in 1939 during the Golden Gate International Exposition.

The Eastern and Western Divisions were created in 1937. Later, the Western Division split into the Southwest and Northwest divisions before the Midwestern states formed the Central Division in 1946. The Southeast division was established in 1951.

The modern day United States National Bowls Championships were inaugurated by ALBA in 1957, although various National Open Championships were held previously.

ALBA merged with the American Women's Lawn Bowls Association (AWLBA) on 1 January 2001 to become the United States Lawn Bowls Association (USLBA) and subsequently USLBA changed its name to Bowls USA in 2012.

== See also ==
- United States National Bowls Championships
- Sport in the United States
