= Charlie Herbert =

American lawn bowler

Personal information
- Nickname: Chazo
- Born: March 16, 1963 (age 63) United States

Sport
- Sport: Lawn bowls
- Club: Laguna Beach, CA; Newport Harbor LBA, CA

Achievements and titles
- Highest world ranking: 39 (August 2026)
Medal record
Representing United States
National Championships
Gold medal – first place	2017	singles
Gold medal – first place	2018	singles
Gold medal – first place	2019	singles
Gold medal – first place	2022	singles
Gold medal – first place	2023	singles
Gold medal – first place	2024	singles
Gold medal – first place	2025	singles

Charlie Herbert is an international lawn bowler from the United States. He is a seven times national champion of the United States. He reached a career high ranking of world number 39 in August 2026.

== Bowls career ==
In early 2016, Herbert was named in the USA's elite World Bowls team. This led to him representing the United States at the sport's blue riband event, the 2016 World Outdoor Bowls Championship.

He was due to compete again for the United States during the 2020 World Outdoor Bowls Championship, but the event was cancelled following the COVID-19 pandemic. However, he was retained for the team to represent them at 2023 World Bowls Championship. He participated in the men's singles and the men's pairs events, the latter as skip.

In 2023, 2024 and 2025, he won his fifth, sixth, and seventh straight singles titles respectively at the United States National Bowls Championships.
