= Jim Craig (bowls) =

Northern Irish international lawn bowler

Personal information
- Nationality: Northern Irish

Sport
- Sport: Lawn bowls
- Club: Cliftonville BC
Medal record
Representing combined Ireland
British Isles Championships
Gold medal – first place	1980	triples
Representing Northern Ireland
Irish Nationals
Gold medal – first place	1979	triples

James "Jim" M. Craig is a former international lawn bowler from Northern Ireland who competed at the Commonwealth Games.

== Biography ==
Craig was a member of the Cliftonville Bowls Club.

Craig represented the Northern Irish team at the 1974 British Commonwealth Games in Christchurch, New Zealand, where he competed in the fours event, with Gerry Sloan, Jimmy Donnelly and Jimmy Dennison.

Craig won the triples title with Robin Gray, Marcus Craig at the 1979 Irish National Bowls Championships. and subsequently qualified to represent Ireland at the British Isles Bowls Championships, where they won the triples title.
