= John McRae (bowls) =

Scottish lan bowler (born c. 1924)

Personal information
- Nationality: British (Scottish)
- Born: c. 1924

Sport
- Sport: Lawn bowls
- Club: Uddingston BC
Medal record
Representing Scotland
Commonwealth Games
| Bronze medal – third place | 1974 Christchurch | men's fours |

John McRae (born c. 1924) is a Scottish former international lawn bowler.

== Biography ==
McRae represented the Scottish team at the 1974 British Commonwealth Games in Christchurch, New Zealand, where he competed in the fours event, with Bill Scott, John Marshall and Morgan Moffat and won a bronze medal.

He played for the Uddingston Bowls Club and captained Scotland for eight years.
