= Harry Taylor (bowls) =

English lawn bowler

Personal information
- Nationality: British (English)
- Born: 1930 (age 95–96)

Sport
- Sport: Lawn bowls
- Club: Alnwick BC

Harry Taylor (born 1930), was an England international lawn bowler.

== Biography ==
Taylor from Alnwick became an international for England when he was capped in 1973.

He represented the England team in the fours event, at the 1974 British Commonwealth Games in Christchurch, New Zealand.

In 1971 and 1977 he was the Northumberland singles county champion. In addition he won two county pairs and one triples title.
