= Jock McAtee =

Scottish bowls player

Personal information
- Nicknames: Jock, Joanie
- Nationality: Scotland
- Born: John McAtee Snr; 14 April 1910 Auchinleck, East Ayrshire
- Died: 2003 (aged 92–93) Catrine, East Ayrshire
- Education: Templetoon, Auchinleck

Sport
- Sport: Lawn bowls
- Club: Catrine BC
- Partner: Helen Boyle
Medal record
Representing Scotland
World Outdoor Championships
Silver medal – second place	1972 Worthing	fours
Gold medal – first place	1972 Worthing	team

John McAtee (1910-2003) was a Scottish international lawn bowler. He was known as Jock McAtee during his playing days.

== Bowls career ==
He won a silver medal in the fours at the 1972 World Outdoor Bowls Championship in Worthing. He also won a gold medal in the team event (Leonard Trophy).

He earned a record 69 international caps. and won the 1948 pairs title and 1985 triples title at the Scottish National Bowls Championships when bowling for the Catrine Bowls Club.
