= Rennie Logan =

Scottish lawn bowler

Personal information
- Nationality: Scotland
- Born: 3 November 1928 Kirkliston, West Lothian
- Died: 21 December 2003 (aged 75)

Sport
- Club: Kirkliston BC
Medal record
Representing Scotland
World Outdoor Championships
Silver medal – second place	1972 Worthing	fours
Gold medal – first place	1972 Worthing	team

A R 'Rennie' Logan (1928-2003) was a former Scottish international lawn bowler.

== Bowls career ==
He won a silver medal in the fours at the 1972 World Outdoor Bowls Championship in Worthing. He also won a gold medal in the team event (Leonard Trophy).

== Family ==
His sons Raymond, Eric and Kenny Logan were all capped by Scotland. Another son, Gordon Logan, played in the English Football League for Port Vale. Nicknamed the Laughing Cavalier he died in 2003. His grandson Grant Logan won gold at the 2011 Atlantic Bowls Championships.
