= John Evans (bowls) =

English footballer (1947–2026)

Personal information
- Born: 24 March 1947 Torquay, England
- Died: 31 October 2026 (aged 79)

Sport
- Sport: Football bowls
- Position: Winger
- Club: Torquay United; Torquay BC
Medal record
Representing (England)
Bowls
World Outdoor Championships
Bronze medal – third place	1976 Johannesburg	fours
Silver medal – second place	1976 Johannesburg	team
Commonwealth Games
Silver medal – second place	1974 Christchurch	pairs

John Charles Evans (24 March 1947 – 31 October 2026) was an English professional footballer and an international bowls player.

== Football career ==
Evans began his footballing career as an apprentice with Torquay United, turning professional in April 1965. He made six league appearances as a winger, scoring once, before leaving Plainmoor. But his football career took second place to bowls.

== Bowls career ==
Evans later became a regular member of the England bowls team, first capped in 1973, then winning a silver medal in the 1974 British Commonwealth Games pairs competition, with Peter Line.

He won a bronze medal in the fours with Bill Irish, Tommy Armstrong and Peter Line at the 1976 World Outdoor Bowls Championship in Johannesburg in addition to a silver medal in the team event (Leonard Cup). He also won a silver in the pairs at the 1974 British Commonwealth Games. He reached the quarter-finals of the World Indoor Bowls Championships singles competition in 1991 and won the national triples in 1994, while bowling for the Torquay bowls club.

In April 2001 he played in a trial to return to the England team for the first time since the 1982–83 bowling season, and later that year qualified to play in the 2002 World Indoor Championships.

== Personal life and death ==
Evans was born in Torquay.

After retirement, he ran a bowls tour company which ceased trading in 2008.

Evans died on 31 October 2026. He was 79.
