= Hugh Andrews =

Welsh International Lawn Bowler

Personal information
- Full name: Hugh Simpson Andrews
- Nationality: Welsh
- Born: 26 January 1924 Llanelli, Carmarthenshire, Wales
- Died: 20 March 2011 (aged 87) Carmarthen, Carmarthenshire, Wales

Sport
- Club: Brynhyfryd BC
Medal record
Representing Wales
World Outdoor Championships
| Bronze medal – third place | 1972 Worthing | triples |

Hugh Simpson Andrews (26 January 1924 – 20 March 2011) was a Welsh international lawn bowler.

== Bowls career ==
Andrews won a bronze medal in the triples at the 1972 World Outdoor Bowls Championship in Worthing. He was capped 27 times by Wales between 1960 and 1972 and was the captain in 1970.

Andrews won the 1971 fours title and finished runner-up in the 1972 pairs at the Welsh National Bowls Championships when bowling for the Brynhyfryd Bowls Club.

== Personal life and death ==
Andrews was a civil servant by trade and took up bowls after his discharge from the Royal Air Force in 1947.

Andrews died in Carmarthen, Carmarthenshire on 20 March 2011, at the age of 87.
