= Leigh Bishop (bowls) =

Australian lawn bowler

Personal information
- Nationality: Australia
- Born: 2 March 1922 Ulverstone, Tasmania, Australia
- Died: 26 February 2016 (aged 93) Port Sorell, Tasmania, Australia

Sport
- Club: Burnie BC, Wynyard BC and Tasmania
Medal record
Representing (Australia)
World Outdoor Championships
Silver medal – second place	1976 Johannesburg	fours
Bronze medal – third place	1976 Johannesburg	team

Leigh Bishop (2 March 1922 – 26 February 2016) was an Australian international lawn bowler.

== Bowls career ==
=== World Championships ===
Bishop won a silver medal in the fours with Don Woolnough, Barry Salter and Keith Poole and a bronze medal in the team event (Leonard Trophy), at the 1976 World Outdoor Bowls Championship in Johannesburg.

=== Personal life ===
He served in the Royal Australian Navy during World War II, and played a variety of sports before settling on lawn bowls in 1951.

He died in 2016.
