= Bill Moseley (bowls) =

South African lawn bowler (born 1945)

Personal information
- Nationality: South Africa
- Born: 1945 (age 80–81)
Medal record
Representing South Africa
World Outdoor Championships
Gold medal – first place	1976 Johannesburg	pairs
Gold medal – first place	1976 Johannesburg	fours
Gold medal – first place	1976 Johannesburg	team

William Moseley (born 1945) is a former South African international lawn bowler.

== Bowls career ==
=== World championships ===
Moseley came to prominence in 1976 when he won the pairs, fours and team gold medal at the 1976 World Outdoor Bowls Championship in Johannesburg. In the pairs he partnered Doug Watson as they won 13 of their 15 matches. In the fours with Kevin Campbell, Nando Gatti and Kelvin Lightfoot the team won 14 of the 15 matches played.

The South African team completed a clean sweep of all events at the 1976 World Outdoor Bowls Championship. The lawn bowlers from South Africa were denied further opportunities to win medals due to the Sporting boycott of South Africa during the apartheid era.

=== National ===
Moseley played bowls from the age of eight and reached his first South African National Bowls Championships singles quarter final in 1970 before winning the national fours in 1971.
