= Dick Bernard =

Scottish lawn bowler

Personal information
- Nationality: British (Scottish)
- Born: 22 June 1917 Gorebridge, Midlothian, Scotland
- Died: 23 February 2012 (aged 94) Gorebridge, Midlothian, Scotland

Sport
- Club: Gorebridge BC
Medal record
Representing Scotland
World Outdoor Championships
| Silver medal – second place | 1972 Worthing | singles |
| Gold medal – first place | 1972 Worthing | team |

Richard "Dick" Bernard (22 June 1917 – 23 February 2012) was a Scottish international lawn bowler who won a gold medal at the world championships.

== Biography ==
Bernard was National champion in 1970.

Benard won a gold medal in the team event (Leonard Trophy) and a silver medal in the singles at the 1972 World Outdoor Bowls Championship in Worthing.

he represented the Scottish team at the 1978 Commonwealth Games in Edmonton, Canada, where he competed in the fours event, with Doug Copland, John Fleming and Willie Adrain.

== Personal life ==
He was a mining engineer by trade. He was a county billiards player before switching to bowls in 1948. He died on 23 February 2012, at the age of 94.
