= Kelvin Lightfoot =

South African bowls player

Kelvin 'Kelly' Lightfoot
Personal information
- Nationality: South Africa
- Born: 6 August 1925
- Died: Unknown

Sport
- Sport: Lwan bowls
Medal record
Representing South Africa
World Outdoor Championships
Bronze medal – third place	1966 Kyeemagh	triples
Gold medal – first place	1976 Johannesburg	triples
Gold medal – first place	1976 Johannesburg	fours
Gold medal – first place	1976 Johannesburg	team

Kelvin 'Kelly' Thomas Lightfoot (1925-date of death unknown) was a former South African international lawn bowler.

== Bowls career ==
=== World Championships ===
Lightfoot came to prominence in 1966 when he won a triples bronze medal at the 1966 World Outdoor Bowls Championship. Ten years later in 1976 he won the triples, fours and team gold medal at the World Outdoor Championships in Johannesburg. In the Triples with Kevin Campbell and Nando Gatti they won 14 of their 15 matches. In the fours with Campbell, Gatti and Bill Moseley they repeated the feat of winning 14 of the 15 matches played.

The South African team completed a clean sweep of all events at the 1976 World Outdoor Bowls Championship. The lawn bowlers from South Africa were denied further opportunities to win medals due to the Sporting boycott of South Africa during the apartheid era.

=== National ===
Lightfoot won the 1959 pairs title, 1962 singles and fours titles and 1969 singles at the South African National Bowls Championships. He was the first winner of the national masters and would have won more frequently but suffered from a back injury.

== Personal life ==
By trade he was a clerk in the South African Railway Offices in Pietermaritzburg. He married in 1948.
