= John Marshall (bowls) =

Scottish lawn bowler

Personal information
- Nationality: British (Scottish)

Sport
- Sport: Lawn bowls
- Club: Mosspark BC
Medal record
Representing Scotland
Commonwealth Games
Bronze medal – third place	1974 Christchurch	men's fours

John Y. Marshall is a Scottish international lawn bowler.

== Biography ==
Marshall was a member of the Mosspark Bowls Club.

Marshall represented the Scottish team at the 1974 British Commonwealth Games in Christchurch, New Zealand, where he participated in the men's fours, with Morgan Moffat, Bill Scott and John McRae and won a bronze medal
