= Norman King (bowls) =

English lawn bowler

Personal information
- Nationality: British (English)
- Born: 7 August 1914 Sunderland, England
- Died: c. December 1997 (aged 83) Bedford, England

Sport
- Sport: Lawn bowls
- Club: Mansfield; Parliament Hill
Medal record
Representing (England)
World Outdoor Championships
Gold medal – first place	1972 Worthing	fours
Commonwealth Games
Gold medal – first place	1958 Cardiff	fours
Gold medal – first place	1970 Edinburgh	pairs

Norman King (7 August 1914 – c. December 1997) was an English international lawn bowler.

== Bowls career ==
King won a gold medal in the fours with Cliff Stroud, Ted Hayward and Peter Line at the 1972 World Outdoor Bowls Championship in Worthing.

He also won two Commonwealth Games medals; a gold for the England team in the 1958 British Empire and Commonwealth Games in Cardiff and another gold in the pairs with Peter Line at the 1970 British Commonwealth Games in Edinburgh.

Bowling for Parliament Hill, he won the National Championship singles title in 1957.

== Personal life ==
He was an agent and salesman by trade and took up bowls in 1942 during wartime holidays.
