= Bill Scott (bowls) =

Scottish lawn bowler

Personal information
- Nationality: British (Scottish)
- Born: c.1910

Sport
- Sport: Lawn bowls
- Club: Craigentinny BC, Edinburgh; Errol BC, Perth
Medal record
Representing Scotland
Commonwealth Games
Bronze medal – third place	1974 Christchurch	men's fours

William "Bill" Garry Scott (1910 – date of death unknown) was an international lawn bowler from Scotland.

== Biography ==
Scott was born in 1910 and was a member of the Craigentinny BC, Edinburgh and then the Errol Bowls Club in Perth.

He represented the Scotland team, at the 1970 British Commonwealth Games in Edinburgh, Scotland, in the pairs event, partnering Alex Henderson. The duo finished one place outside of the medal positions in fourth place. At the time of the Games he was a first-aid attendant.

Four years later, he won a bronze medal in the men's fours at the 1974 Commonwealth Games in Christchurch, with Morgan Moffat, John Marshall and John McRae.

Scott won the pairs with Henderson at the Scottish National Bowls Championships in 1968 and subsequently won the British Isles Bowls Championships the following year in 1959.
