= Barry Salter =

Australian lawn bowler

Personal information
- Nationality: Australia
- Born: 27 October 1936 Merewether, New South Wales
- Died: 12 August 2007 (aged 70) Waratah, New South Wales

Sport
- Club: Waratah BC and NSW
Medal record
Representing (Australia)
World Outdoor Championships
Silver medal – second place	1976 Johannesburg	Fours
Bronze medal – third place	1976 Johannesburg	Team

Barry Salter (1936–2007) was an Australian international lawn bowler. He won a silver medal in the fours with Don Woolnough, Leigh Bishop and Keith Poole, and a team bronze medal (Leonard Trophy) at the 1976 World Outdoor Bowls Championship in Johannesburg. He represented New South Wales in 227 Tests.
