= Lionel Coventry =

Australian caricaturist and cartoonist (1906–1986)

- Born: 15 March 1906; Broken Hill, New South Wales, Australia
- Died: 23 July 1986 (aged 80)
- Occupations: Caricaturist, cartoonist, satirist, journalist
- Known for: Sporting and celebrity portrait caricatures in South Australia

Lionel Coventry (1906–1986) was an Australian caricaturist, cartoonist, and satirist. Working primarily between the 1920s and 1970s, he produced more than 30,000 portrait caricatures for newspapers and magazines in Adelaide and across Australia, becoming particularly well known for his depictions of South Australian sporting identities, politicians, legal figures, and visiting celebrities.

== Early life and breakthrough ==
Coventry was born in Broken Hill, New South Wales, in 1906, and relocated with his family to Adelaide, South Australia, during his childhood. Largely self-taught as an illustrator, he began his career working as a journalist.

His career breakthrough came in 1928 during the 1928–29 Ashes series, when his newspaper editor assigned him to attend Adelaide Oval and sketch members of the touring English cricket team. Coventry's drawings of the squad were published on the front page of a London newspaper, establishing his reputation as a portrait caricaturist.

== Career and style ==
Following his 1928 breakthrough, Coventry's caricatures appeared regularly in South Australian and national publications for five decades. He became a fixture of weekend sports coverage in Adelaide, particularly for his caricatures of South Australian National Football League (SANFL) players and cricketers. Notable sporting figures depicted by Coventry included Test cricketers Vic Richardson and Gil Langley, as well as Australian rules footballers Len Fitzgerald, Bob Hank, and Lindsay Head.

Beyond sport, Coventry drew prominent figures from South Australian public life, including members of the legal profession and the state's wine industry, as well as international visitors. During the 1930s, English playwright Noël Coward admired Coventry's work while visiting Australia and offered to take him to Hollywood, an offer Coventry declined in order to remain in Adelaide.

In 1936, to commemorate the centenary of South Australia, Coventry self-published South Australian Centenary Celebrities: Caricatures by Lionel Coventry, a 106-page limited-edition volume edited by N. E. J. Sewell and H. Wright Harrison.

== Later life and legacy ==
Coventry retired from drawing in the 1970s, having created an estimated 30,000 to 33,000 individual caricatures over his career. He died in 1986.

Original works by Coventry are held in institutional collections, including the Art Gallery of South Australia and the SANFL History Centre. In 2022, a retrospective exhibition of his caricatures of South Australian football, legal, and wine industry figures from the 1920s to the 1950s was staged at the National Wine Centre of Australia in Adelaide as part of the SANFL's 145th-anniversary celebrations.

== Publications ==
- Coventry, Lionel (1936). Sewell, N. E. J.; Harrison, H. Wright (eds.). South Australian Centenary Celebrities: Caricatures by Lionel Coventry. Adelaide: Lionel Coventry. p. 106.
