= Bill Tewksbury =

American lawn bowler

Personal information
- Nationality: United States
- Born: 24 January 1905
- Died: 1999 Pinellas County, Florida

Sport
- Club: Clearwater BC
Medal record
Representing United States
World Outdoor Championships
Silver medal – second place	1972 Worthing	pairs
Bronze medal – third place	1972 Worthing	team

Willis "Bill" John Tewksbury (1905–1999) was a United States international lawn bowler.

== Bowls career ==
He won a silver medal in the pairs with Jim Candelet at the 1972 World Outdoor Bowls Championship in Worthing. He also won a bronze medal in the team event (Leonard Trophy).

== Awards ==
He was inducted into the USA Hall of Fame and was a seven times National Champion.
