= Skippy Arculli =

American lawn and indoor bowler

Personal information
- Nationality: United States
Medal record
Representing United States
World Outdoor Championships
Gold medal – first place	1984 Aberdeen	Men's pairs

Skippy Arculli is a former United States international lawn and indoor bowler.

Arculli won a gold medal in the 1984 World Outdoor Championships in Aberdeen but his partner Jim Candelet fell ill during the competition and was unable to play in the final. He was replaced by the Scottish reserve George Adrain.

He won born in Hong Kong winning the National triples title in 1965. After emigrating to the United States he won four United States Championships, three in the singles (1978, 1981 & 1995) and one in the pairs (1983).

A banking executive by trade he bowled for Essex County in Nutley, New Jersey.
