= Clive Forrester =

American lawn bowler (1911–1992)

Personal information
- Nationality: United States
- Born: 3 September 1911 Maunie, Illinois
- Died: 27 February 1992 (aged 80) Sun City, Arizona

Sport
- Sport: Lawn bowls
- Club: San Francisco BC
Medal record
Representing United States
World Outdoor Championships
Gold medal – first place	1972 Worthing	triples
Bronze medal – third place	1972 Worthing	team

Clive Forrester (1911-1992), was a United States international lawn bowler.

== Bowls career ==
He won a gold medal in the triples with Bill Miller and Dick Folkins at the 1972 World Outdoor Bowls Championship in Worthing. He also won a bronze medal in the team event (Leonard Trophy).

He won two US National titles, the singles in 1970 and pairs in 1969.

== Personal life ==
He was a postal worker by trade and started bowling in 1957 and was elected to the A.L.B.A when the Pacific Mountain Division was formed.
