= Bob Schneider (bowls) =

American lawn bowler

Personal information
- Nationality: American
- Born: United States

Sport
- Sport: Lawn bowls
- Club: Central Division/ Milwaukee Lake Park
Medal record
Representing United States
National Championships
Gold medal – first place	2004	singles
Gold medal – first place	2006	pairs
Gold medal – first place	2009	pairs
Gold medal – first place	2015	pairs

Bob Schneider is an international lawn bowler from the United States. He is a four times national champion of the United States.

== Bowls career ==
Schneider came to prominence after winning the United States national championship singles in 2004.

After three national pairs titles in 2006, 2009 and 2015 he was selected to represent the United States at the sport's blue riband event, the 2020 World Outdoor Bowls Championship in Australia. The Championships were cancelled following the COVID-19 pandemic.

In 2023, he represented the US team at the World Championships, after being selected for the 2023 World Bowls Championship. He participated in the men's pairs and the men's fours events.
