= Errol Stewart (bowls) =

Australian lawn bowler (born 1931)

Personal information
- Nationality: Australia
- Born: 21 December 1931 (age 94)
Medal record
Representing Australia
Commonwealth Games
Silver medal – second place	1974 Christchurch	fours

Errol Stewart (born 21 December 1931) is an Australian former international lawn bowler.

Stewart won a silver medal in the fours with Errol Bungey, Robert King and Keith Poole at the 1974 British Commonwealth Games in Christchurch.
