= Neil McInnes (bowls) =

Personal information
- Nationality: United States
- Born: 1928 (age 97–98) Glasgow

Sport
- Club: Pasadena BC
Medal record
Representing United States
World Outdoor Championships
Silver medal – second place	1976 Johannesburg	Men's pairs

Neil McInnes (born 1928) is a Scottish born former United States international lawn and indoor bowler.

McInnes won a silver medal in the 1976 World Outdoor Championships in Johannesburg with his bowls partner Dick Folkins. He was born in Glasgow and moved to California in 1970.

He made eighteen United States Championship appearances, winning three singles titles and seven pairs titles and was a carpenter by trade.
