= Dick Folkins =

US international lawn bowler (1917-1987)

Personal information
- Nationality: United States
- Born: 12 March 1917 San Bernardino, California
- Died: 23 June 1987 (aged 70) Orange, California

Sport
- Sport: Lawn bowls
- Club: Arroyo Seco Bowling Club
Medal record
Representing United States
World Outdoor Championships
Gold medal – first place	1972 Worthing	triples
Bronze medal – third place	1972 Worthing	team
Silver medal – second place	1976 Johannesburg	pairs

Richard Wilson Folkins (1917-1987), was a United States international lawn bowler.

== Bowls career ==
He won a gold medal in the triples with Bill Miller and Clive Forrester at the 1972 World Outdoor Bowls Championship in Worthing. He also won a bronze medal in the team event (Leonard Trophy).

Folkins won a silver medal in the 1976 World Outdoor Championships in Johannesburg with his bowls partner Neil McInnes.

In addition he won fourteen US Open titles.

== Personal life ==
He was a highway planning engineer by trade. He died in 1987. He was married to fellow international bowler Corinna Folkins.
