= Athletics at the 1974 British Commonwealth Games – Women's pentathlon =

Women's pentathlon at the Commonwealth Games

The women's pentathlon event at the 1974 British Commonwealth Games was held on 25 January at the Queen Elizabeth II Park in Christchurch, New Zealand.

== Results ==
The highest mark recorded in each event is highlighted in yellow. The gold medallist won two events but did not compete in the long jump nor the 200 metres, both of which were won by Erica Nixon who placed fourth.

Rank	Athlete	Nationality	100m H	SP	HJ	LJ	200m	Points	Notes
1st place, gold medalist(s)	Mary Peters	Northern Ireland	13.94	15.05	1.74			4455	
2nd place, silver medalist(s)	Modupe Oshikoya	Nigeria	13.72		1.74			4423	
3rd place, bronze medalist(s)	Ann Wilson	England	13.98		1.74	6.01		4236	
4	Erica Nixon	Australia	14.72	10.22	1.70	6.45	24.58	4206	
5	Barbara Poulsen	New Zealand	14.41	14.82				4158	
6	Diane Jones	Canada	14.79	14.39				4079	
7	Sue Mapstone	England	14.44					4060	
8	Sue Scott	Australia	14.15	9.77	1.66	5.94	24.97	4058	
9	Janet Honour	England	14.34					4043	
10	Susan New	Australia	14.48	9.23	1.55	6.01	24.97	3881	
11	Susan Burnside	New Zealand	15.05			6.02		3726	
12	Miriama Tuisorisori	Fiji	14.65					3572	
	Myra Nimmo	Scotland	14.15					DNF	
