= David Hull (bowls) =

Personal information
- Nationality: Northern Ireland
- Born: 1944 (age 81–82) Newry

Sport
- Club: Castleton BC
Medal record
Representing Northern Ireland and Ireland
World Outdoor Championships
Bronze medal – third place	1976 Johannesburg	triples

David G Hull (born 1944) is a Northern Irish international lawn and indoor bowler.

He won a bronze medal in the triples at the 1976 World Outdoor Bowls Championship in Johannesburg.

He was Irish bowler of the year in 1971.
