= Jack Christie (bowls) =

Scottish lawn bowler

Personal information
- Nationality: British (Scottish)
- Born: 17 July 1925 Edinburgh, Scotland
- Died: 2 January 2007 (aged 81) Leith, Scotland

Sport
- Sport: Lawn bowls
- Club: Edinburgh Northern BC
Medal record
Representing Scotland
Commonwealth Games
Gold medal – first place	1974 Christchurch	pairs

John "Jack" Christie (17 July 1925 – 2 January 2007) was a Scottish international lawn bowler.

== Biography ==
Christie started bowling aged 18. In 1956 joined Northern Bowling Club of Edinburgh. He won the championship eight times and made his international debut in 1965. He was capped 70 times.

His greatest moment came when representing the Scottish team at the 1974 British Commonwealth Games in Christchurch, New Zealand, where he competed in the pairs event with Alex McIntosh and won the gold medal.

Christie was a Scottish international from 1965 to 1974.

Christie died in Edinburgh on 2 January 2007, at the age of 81.
