= Bill Miller (bowls) =

United States lawn bowler

Personal information
- Nationality: (Scotland) & (United States)
- Born: 11 November 1910 Motherwell, Scotland
- Died: 20 March 2004 (aged 93) Clearwater, Florida

Sport
- Sport: Lawn bowls
- Club: Gary, Indiana BC; Clearwater BC
Medal record
Representing United States
World Outdoor Championships
Gold medal – first place	1972 Worthing	triples
Bronze medal – third place	1972 Worthing	team

William McConnell Miller (1910–2004), was a Scottish born United States international lawn bowler.

== Bowls career ==
He emigrated to the United States in 1928, joined the Gary Bowls Club in 1939 and became a United States citizen one year later in 1940. He won a gold medal in the triples with Dick Folkins and Clive Forrester at the 1972 World Outdoor Bowls Championship in Worthing. He also won a bronze medal in the team event (Leonard Trophy).

== Bowls official ==
He joined the A.L.B.A council in 1964 and was the first vice-president of the club.

== Awards ==
He was inducted into the USA Hall of Fame. He died in 2004.
