= Anne Nunes =

United States lawn bowls international

Personal information
- Nationality: American
- Born: May 30, 1969 (age 57)

Sport
- Club: Newport Harbor LBC

Achievements and titles
- Highest world ranking: 38 (August 2026)
Medal record
Representing United States
World Singles Champion of Champions
Bronze medal – third place	2022 Wellington	singles
Gold medal – first place	2023 Gold Coast	singles
Silver medal – second place	2024 Auckland	singles
Asia Pacific Bowls Championships
Bronze medal – third place	2001 Melbourne	pairs
Silver medal – second place	2015 Christchurch	fours
National Championships
Gold medal – first place	2003	singles
Gold medal – first place	2015	singles
Gold medal – first place	2017	singles
Gold medal – first place	2019	singles
Gold medal – first place	2022	singles
Gold medal – first place	2023	singles

Anne Nunes (born 30 May 1969) is a United States lawn bowls international, who is a former world champion and six-times national champion. She reached a career high ranking of world number 38 in August 2026.

== Bowls career ==
In 2001, Nunes won a pairs bronze medal at the Asia Pacific Bowls Championships, 14 years later she won a second medal at the Championships winning a fours silver medal in Christchurch, New Zealand.

Nunes competed at the 2016 World Outdoor Bowls Championship in Christchurch and four years later in 2020, was selected for the 2020 World Outdoor Bowls Championship in Australia but the event was cancelled due to the COVID-19 pandemic.

In 2023, she was selected again as part of the team to represent the USA at the 2023 World Outdoor Bowls Championship. She participated in the women's singles and the women's pairs events.

Shortly after the World Championships and still on the Gold Coast, Nunes was a surprise winner of the World Singles Champion of Champions title to become the first US winner of the event. She defeated Guernsey's Lucy Beere in the final, 5–2, 3–4, 6–3.

In late 2023, she won her sixth singles title at the United States National Bowls Championships. In 2024, Nunes narrowly failed to become the first bowler to retain the World Singles Champion of Champions title, after reaching the final she lost out to Milika Nathan.

== Personal life ==
Nunes in an engineer by trade.
