= Doug Watson (bowls) =

Personal information
- Nationality: South Africa
- Born: 1943 Brakpan
- Died: 2005 (aged 61–62)

Sport
- Sport: Lawn bowls
- Club: Springwood BC
Medal record
Representing South Africa
World Outdoor Championships
Silver medal – second place	1972 Worthing	triples
Silver medal – second place	1972 Worthing	team
Gold medal – first place	1976 Johannesburg	singles
Gold medal – first place	1976 Johannesburg	pairs
Gold medal – first place	1976 Johannesburg	team

Douglas Grant Watson (1943-2005), was a South African international lawn bowler.

== Bowls career ==
=== World championships ===
Doug came to prominence in 1972 when he won silver medal in the triples at the 1972 World Outdoor Bowls Championship in Worthing. He also won a silver medal in the team event (Leonard Trophy).

Four years later he won the singles, pairs and team gold medals at the 1976 World Outdoor Bowls Championship in Johannesburg. He won 14 of his 15 matches to win the singles ahead of Bob Middleton of Australia and David Bryant of England. In the Pairs he partnered Bill Moseley as they won 13 of their 15 matches.

=== International ===
In 1972 aged 29 he became the youngest bowler ever to represent South Africa. His international success was cut short by 1980 because South Africa had been excluded from competing by the IBB. In 1976 he was invited by the Waratah Club of Australia to compete in a bowls competition and the Australian authorities missed the fact that he was competing as a South African national which was not allowed because of their stance against Apartheid in South Africa.

=== National ===
He won the 1971 pairs title and the 1968 fours title at the South African National Bowls Championships when bowling for the Springwood Bowls Club.

== Personal life ==
He was a sales representative by trade.
