= Lawn bowls at the 1974 British Commonwealth Games =

- Venue: Woolston Working Men's Club
- Location: Christchurch, New Zealand
- Dates: 24 January – 2 February 1974

Lawn bowls at the 1974 British Commonwealth Games was the ninth appearance of the Lawn bowls at the Commonwealth Games. Competition at the 1974 British Commonwealth Games took place in Christchurch, New Zealand from 24 January until 2 February 1974.

The events were held at the 2,000 seating capacity Woolston Working Men's Club, where three greens consisting of Cotula weed provided the playing surface. The pavilion had been recently refurbished.

David Bryant won his third successive Commonwealth Games singles gold medal, with a medals cache of four golds although not competing in 1966. Host country New Zealand won the fours (their seventh gold medal since the start of the games in 1930).

== Medal table ==
* Host nation (New Zealand)

| Rank | Nation | Gold | Silver | Bronze | Total |
|---|---|---|---|---|---|
| 1 | England | 1 | 1 | 0 | 2 |
| 2 | Scotland | 1 | 0 | 2 | 3 |
| 3 | New Zealand* | 1 | 0 | 1 | 2 |
| 4 | Australia | 0 | 2 | 0 | 2 |
| Totals (4 entries) | | 3 | 3 | 3 | 9 |

== Medallists ==
| Event | Gold | Silver | Bronze |
|---|---|---|---|
| Men's singles | (England); David Bryant | (Australia); Clive White | (Scotland); Willie Wood |
| Men's pairs | (Scotland); Jack Christie; Alex McIntosh | (England); John Evans; Peter Line | (New Zealand); Bob McDonald; Phil Skoglund |
| Men's fours | (New Zealand); Kerry Clark; David Baldwin; John 'Jack' Somerville; Gordon Jolly | (Australia); Robert King; Errol Bungey; Errol Stewart; Keith Poole | (Scotland); John Marshall; Morgan Moffat; Bill Scott; John McRae |

== Results ==
=== Men's singles – round robin ===
| Pos | Player | P | W | L | F | A | Pts |
|---|---|---|---|---|---|---|---|
| 1 | (England) David Bryant | 13 | 11 | 2 | 267 | 147 | 22 |
| 2 | (Australia) Clive White | 13 | 10 | 3 | 269 | 197 | 20 |
| 3 | (Scotland) Willie Wood | 13 | 9 | 4 | 257 | 191 | 18 |
| 4 | (New Zealand) Percy Jones | 13 | 9 | 4 | 260 | 215 | 18 |
| 5 | (Wales) Maldwyn Evans | 13 | 9 | 4 | 232 | 213 | 18 |
| 6 | (Kenya) Denis Gosden | 13 | 7 | 6 | 212 | 212 | 14 |
| 7 | (Northern Ireland) Roy Fulton | 13 | 6 | 7 | 220 | 210 | 12 |
| 8 | (Hong Kong) Omar Dallah | 13 | 6 | 7 | 232 | 251 | 12 |
| 9 | (Malawi) Harry Lakin | 13 | 6 | 7 | 213 | 239 | 12 |
| 10 | (Fiji) Sydney Snowsil | 13 | 6 | 7 | 209 | 266 | 10 |
| 11 | (Guernsey) Roy De Feu | 13 | 4 | 9 | 200 | 241 | 8 |
| 12 | (Canada) Neal Salkeld | 13 | 3 | 10 | 195 | 262 | 6 |
| 13 | (Samoa) James S Williams | 13 | 3 | 10 | 201 | 259 | 6 |
| 14 | (Papua New Guinea) Oswald Dent | 13 | 3 | 10 | 180 | 264 | 6 |

=== Men's pairs – round robin ===
| Pos | Player | P | W | D | L | F | A | Pts |
|---|---|---|---|---|---|---|---|---|
| 1 | (Scotland) Jack Christie & Alex McIntosh | 13 | 11 | 1 | 1 | 294 | 202 | 23 |
| 2 | (England) John Evans & Peter Line | 13 | 11 | 0 | 2 | 366 | 185 | 22 |
| 3 | (New Zealand) Bob McDonald & Phil Skoglund | 13 | 10 | 1 | 2 | 297 | 201 | 21 |
| 4 | (Wales) Jock Thompson & Ellis Stanbury | 13 | 9 | 1 | 3 | 296 | 228 | 19 |
| 5 | (Fiji) Sean Patton & Peter Underhill | 13 | 9 | 1 | 3 | 299 | 238 | 19 |
| 6 | (Australia) Peter Rheuben & John Dobbie | 13 | 8 | 0 | 5 | 323 | 214 | 16 |
| 7 | (Papua New Guinea) Gary Forbes & Alan Ramsbocham | 13 | 5 | 0 | 8 | 297 | 252 | 10 |
| 8 | (Northern Ireland) Billy Pimley & Billy Tate | 13 | 5 | 0 | 8 | 243 | 264 | 10 |
| 9 | (Hong Kong) Saco Delgado & Eric Liddell | 13 | 5 | 0 | 8 | 231 | 285 | 10 |
| 10 | (Samoa) Ioapo Iosia & John Suhren | 13 | 4 | 0 | 9 | 181 | 358 | 8 |
| 11 | (Malawi) Peter Cross & Alexander 'Sandy' Ross | 13 | 3 | 0 | 10 | 235 | 289 | 6 |
| 12 | (Kenya) Harry Smith & Reuben Rose | 13 | 3 | 0 | 10 | 227 | 285 | 6 |
| 13 | (Guernsey) Donald Ingrouille & Cyril Smith | 13 | 3 | 0 | 10 | 173 | 364 | 6 |
| 14 | (Canada) James Macauley & Edward Franklin | 13 | 2 | 0 | 11 | 188 | 353 | 4 |

=== Men's fours – round robin ===
| Pos | Player | P | W | D | L | F | A | Pts |
|---|---|---|---|---|---|---|---|---|
| 1 | (New Zealand) Kerry Clark, David Baldwin, Jack Somerville, Gordon Jolly | 12 | 10 | 0 | 2 | 308 | 171 | 20 |
| 2 | (Australia) Robert King, Errol Bungey, Errol Stewart, Keith Poole | 12 | 9 | 0 | 3 | 297 | 196 | 18 |
| 3 | (Scotland) John Marshall, Morgan Moffat, Bill Scott, John McRae | 12 | 8 | 1 | 3 | 271 | 188 | 17 |
| 4 | (Wales) John Russell Evans, Dai Richards, Gareth Humphreys, Ian Sutherland | 12 | 7 | 1 | 4 | 257 | 205 | 15 |
| 5 | (England) Dave Crocker, Bob Robertson, Harry Taylor, Ted Hayward | 12 | 7 | 0 | 5 | 261 | 211 | 14 |
| 6 | (Papua New Guinea) Barrie Baxter, Robert Henderson, Charles Carter, Harley Triggs | 12 | 6 | 1 | 5 | 234 | 228 | 13 |
| 7 | (Fiji) Peter Fong, George Thaggard, Ram Harakh, Peter Oates | 12 | 6 | 0 | 6 | 224 | 268 | 12 |
| 8 | (Hong Kong) Oscar Adem, Abdul Kitchell, George Souza Sr., Roberto da Silva | 12 | 5 | 0 | 7 | 205 | 269 | 10 |
| 9 | (Zambia) J Fridenthal John Cadogan, John Stalker, Ray Pears | 12 | 4 | 0 | 8 | 209 | 248 | 8 |
| 10 | (Northern Ireland) Gerry Sloan, Jim Craig, Jimmy Donnelly, Jimmy Dennison | 12 | 4 | 0 | 8 | 206 | 262 | 8 |
| 11 | (Samoa) Falevi Petana, Sione Lino, Si'imoa Tolova'a, Leta'a Sulu Devoe | 12 | 4 | 0 | 8 | 185 | 294 | 8 |
| 12 | (Kenya) Clifford de Rungary, Charles Gibbons, John Eatly, Ronald Hedges | 12 | 3 | 1 | 8 | 207 | 286 | 7 |
| 13 | (Canada) George Robbins, Graham Jarvis, John Miller, Ronnie Jones | 12 | 3 | 0 | 9 | 220 | 250 | 6 |

== See also ==
- List of Commonwealth Games medallists in lawn bowls
- Lawn bowls at the Commonwealth Games
