= Errol Bungey =

Australian bowls player

Personal information
- Nationality: Australia
- Born: 4 July 1931 (age 94)

Sport
- Club: Grange Bowling Club
Medal record
Representing Australia
Commonwealth Games
Silver medal – second place	1974 Christchurch	fours

Errol Bungey OAM (born 1931) is a former Australian international lawn bowler who played 68 times for his country.

== Bowls career ==
Bungey won a silver medal in the fours with Robert King, Errol Stewart and Keith Poole at the 1974 British Commonwealth Games in Christchurch.

He was awarded the Order of Australia Medal in 1986 and was inducted into the South Australia Hall of Fame.
