= Jim Candelet =

American lawn bowler

James 'Jim' Candelet
Personal information
- Nationality: United States
- Born: January 13, 1918
- Died: January 1986

Sport
- Club: Smithfield Avenue
Medal record
Representing United States
World Outdoor Championships
| Silver medal – second place | 1972 Worthing | pairs |
| Bronze medal – third place | 1972 Worthing | team |
| Gold medal – first place | 1984 Aberdeen | pairs |

James Candelet (January 13, 1918 – January 1986) was a United States international lawn bowler.

== Bowls career ==
Candelet won two medals at the 1972 World Outdoor Bowls Championship in Worthing; a silver medal in the pairs with Bill Tewksbury and bronze medal in the team event (Leonard Trophy).

Twelve years later he won a gold medal in the 1984 World Outdoor Championships in Aberdeen but fell ill during the competition and was unable to play in the final leaving Skippy Arculli without a partner. He was replaced by the Scottish reserve George Adrain.

He won seven United States Championships, four in the singles (1961, 1966, 1971 and 1980) and three in the pairs (1959, 1968 and 1983). He played in the first six World Outdoor Championships winning silver in the 1972 pairs.

He took up bowls in 1932. He was president of American Lawn Bowls Association from 1970 to 1972 and his wife Elda was a keen bowls player. He bowled for St. Petersburg and Pawtucket and Providence.
