= Cedric =

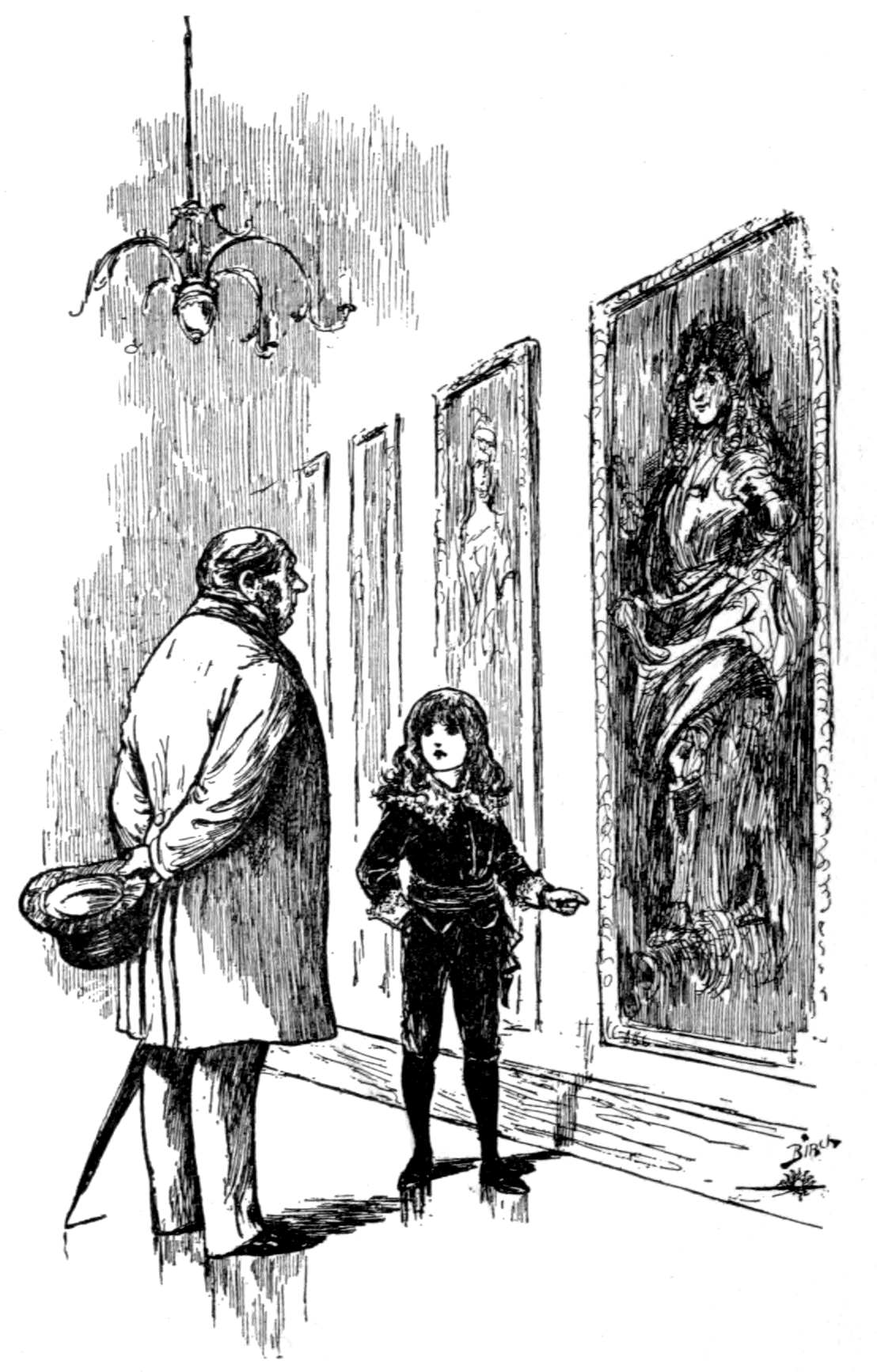
- An illustration from Little Lord Fauntleroy, by Frances Hodgson Burnett. A character in the children’s novel helped popularize the name Cedric.
- Gender: Unisex
- Language: English

Origin
- Meaning: Literary, invented name
- Region of origin: Belgium, Canada, France, Switzerland, United Kingdom, United States

Cedric (/ˈsɛdrɪk/) is a given name invented by Sir Walter Scott in the 1819 novel Ivanhoe.

== Etymology ==
The invented name is based on Cerdic, the name of a 6th-century Anglo-Saxon king (itself from Brittonic Coroticus).

== Popularity ==
The name was not popularly used until the children's book Little Lord Fauntleroy by Frances Hodgson Burnett was published in 1885 to 1886, the protagonist of which is called Cedric Errol. The book was highly successful, causing a fashion trend in children's formal dress in America and popularized the given name. People named Cedric born in the years following the novel's publication include British naval officer Cedric Holland (1889–1950), American war pilot Cedric Fauntleroy (1891–1973), Irish art director Austin Cedric Gibbons (1893–1960) and British actor Cedric Hardwicke (1893–1964).

The name has ranked among the top 1,000 names for boys in the United States at different points since 1903. It ranked 958th on the popularity chart in 2022. It is a name used for both sexes in French-speaking countries. It ranked among the top 500 names for boys in France between 1960 and 2010. It also ranked among the most used names for girls in France between 1966 and 1998. It was among the 100 most used names for boys in Quebec, Canada between 1980 and 2013. It ranked among the most popular names for children of both sexes in Belgium at different points in the 1990s and in the 2000s. It was among the top 100 names for boys in Switzerland between 1998 and 2004.

== Usage ==
Cedric Diggory is a character in the Harry Potter novel series by J.K. Rowling and films based on the novels.

The name was also applied to Nissan's executive car between 1960 and 2004 (private use) and 2015 (taxi) as Nissan Cedric.

The codename Cedric was applied to the Moto G5 smartphone.

== People ==
- Cédric Bah (born 1994), Ivorian basketball player
- Cédric Bakambu (born 1991), French-Congolese football player
- Cedric "CJ" Baxter (born 2005), American football player
- Cedric Belfrage (1904–1990), British writer
- Cedric Benson (1982–2019), American football player
- Cedric Bixler-Zavala (born 1974), American musician
- Cedric Bozeman (born 1983), American basketball player
- Cedric Brooks (1943–2013), Jamaican musician
- Cedric Ceballos (born 1969), American basketball player
- Cedric Coward (born 2003), American basketball player
- Cedric Dempsey (1932–2025), American sports executive
- Cédric Follador (born 1994), Swiss bobsledder
- Cedric Gervais (born 1979), French disc jockey
- Cedric Gibbons (1893–1960), Irish-born American art director
- Cedric Glover (born 1965), American politician
- Cédric Gracia (born 1978), French cyclist
- Cedric Gray (born 2002), American football player
- Cedric van der Gun (born 1979), Dutch footballer
- Cedric Hardwicke (1893–1964), British actor
- Cédric Heymans (born 1978), French rugby player
- Cedric Holland (1889–1950), British naval officer
- Cedric Johnson (born 2002), American football player
- Cédric Kanté (born 1979), French football player
- Cédric Klapisch (born 1961), French film director
- Cedric Kyles (born 1964), aka Cedric the Entertainer, American actor and comedian
- Cedric Maake (born 1965), South African serial killer and rapist
- Cédric Matéta Nkomi (born 1992) French-Congolese Musician
- Cedric Maxwell (born 1955), American basketball player
- Cedric McKinnon (1968–2016), American football player
- Cédric Michaud (born 1976), French skater
- Cédric Mongongu (born 1989), Congolese football player
- Cedric Morris (1889–1982), Welsh painter
- Cedric Mullins (born 1994), American baseball player
- Cedric Nicolas-Troyan (born 1969), French-American film director
- Cedric Oglesby (born 1977), American football player
- Cédric Paquette (born 1993), Canadian ice hockey player
- Cédric Pénicaud (born 1971), French swimmer
- Cédric Perrin (born 1974), French politician
- Cédric Pioline (born 1969), French tennis player
- Cedric Price (1934–2003), British architect
- Cedric Richmond (born 1973), American politician
- Cedric Robinson (1940–2016), American professor
- Cedric Robinson (guide) (1933–2021), British guide and fisherman
- Cedric Smith, several people
- Cédric Soares (born 1991), Portuguese football player
- Cedric Spencer, Australian politician and lawyer
- Cédric Taymans (born 1975), Belgian judoka
- Cedric Tillman (disambiguation), multiple people
- Cedric Thornberry (1936–2014), Northern Irish international lawyer and Assistant-Secretary-General of the United Nations
- Cédric Van der Elst (born 1980), Belgian soccer player
- Cédric Verschueren (born 2004), Belgian sprinter
- Cédric Villani (born 1973), French mathematician
- Cedric Yarbrough (born 1973), American comedian and actor

== Fiction ==
- Cedric the Saxon (Cedric of Rotherwood), character in the 1819 novel Ivanhoe by Walter Scott
- Cedric Errol, character in the 1886 novel Little Lord Fauntleroy by Frances Hodgson Burnett
- Cédric, character in the Franco-Belgian comic book Cédric by Laudec and Cauvin
- Cedric Crackenthorpe, character in the 4:50 from Paddington by Agatha Christie
- Cedric, character in the 1992 film Home Alone 2: Lost in New York
- Cedric Daniels, character in the television series The Wire
- Cedric Diggory, character in the Harry Potter series
- Cedric (W.I.T.C.H.), character in the Italian comic book series W.I.T.C.H.
- Cedric Sneer, character in The Raccoons, a Canadian animated television series
- Cedric the Owl, character in the King's Quest adventure game series and other Sierra Entertainment video games
- Cedric the Sorcerer, character in the Sofia the First animated TV series
- Cedric K. Ros—, character in the manga Black Butler by Yana Toboso
- Cedric Brandel, character in the anime Black Butler
