= 1960 in New Zealand =

- Decades: 1940s; 1950s; 1960s; 1970s; 1980s
- See also: History of New Zealand; List of years in New Zealand; Timeline of New Zealand history

The following lists events that happened during 1960 in New Zealand.

== Population ==
- Estimated population as of 31 December: 2,403,600.
- Increase since 31 December 1959: 43,900 (1.86%).
- Males per 100 females: 101.0.

== Incumbents ==
=== Regal and viceregal ===
- Head of State – Elizabeth II
- Governor-General – The Viscount Cobham GCMG TD.

=== Government ===
The 32nd New Zealand Parliament continued. In power was the Second Labour government under Walter Nash. The general election saw the governing Labour Party defeated by a twelve-seat margin, and replaced by the Second National government.

- Speaker of the House – Robert Macfarlane.
- Prime Minister – Walter Nash then Keith Holyoake
- Deputy Prime Minister – Jerry Skinner then Jack Marshall.
- Minister of Finance – Arnold Nordmeyer then Harry Lake.
- Minister of Foreign Affairs – Walter Nash then Keith Holyoake.
- Attorney-General – Rex Mason, then Ralph Hanan.
- Chief Justice — Sir Harold Barrowclough

=== Parliamentary opposition ===
- Leader of the Opposition – Keith Holyoake (National) until 12 December, then Walter Nash (Labour)

=== Main centre leaders ===
- Mayor of Auckland – Dove-Myer Robinson
- Mayor of Hamilton – Denis Rogers
- Mayor of Wellington – Frank Kitts
- Mayor of Christchurch – George Manning
- Mayor of Dunedin – Stuart Sidey

== Events ==
- Passing of the Waitangi Day Act 1960, first step towards a national day.
- 26 November: 1960 New Zealand general election

== Arts and literature ==
- Maurice Duggan wins the Robert Burns Fellowship.

See 1960 in art, 1960 in literature

=== Music ===
See: 1960 in music

=== Radio and television ===
- 1 June: At 7.30 pm New Zealand's first official television transmission begins. For the first six weeks programs are limited to two hours a night and two nights a week. In mid-July this is extended to four nights a week. A television licence fee of £4 per year is introduced in August.

=== Film ===
See: Category:1960 film awards, 1960 in film, List of New Zealand feature films, Cinema of New Zealand, Category:1960 films

== Sport ==
- See: 1960 in sports, Category:1960 in sports

=== Athletics ===
- Ray Puckett wins his third national title in the men's marathon, clocking 2:23:12.6 on 8 March in Invercargill.

=== Chess ===
- The 67th National Chess Championship was held in Dunedin, and was won by Ortvin Sarapu of Auckland.

=== Cricket ===
- The Australian team toured but games against the national side did not have Test status.
- Plunket Shield was won by Canterbury (1959-1960 season)

=== Horse racing ===
==== Harness racing ====
- New Zealand Trotting Cup – False Step (3rd win)
- Auckland Trotting Cup – Damian

=== Lawn bowls ===
The national outdoor lawn bowls championships are held in Dunedin.

- Men's singles champion – Stanley Snedden (Linwood Bowling Club)
- Men's pair champions – E.H. Taylor, Pete Skoglund (skip) (Carlton Bowling Club)
- Men's fours champions – H. Roy, J. Scott, B. Moore, Bill O'Neill (skip) (Carlton Bowling Club)

=== Olympic Games ===
==== Summer Olympics ====
Gold	Silver	Bronze	Total
2	0	1	3

- New Zealand enters 38 competitors in nine sports, winning two gold (Peter Snell – Athletics, Men's 800m, Murray Halberg – Athletics, Men's 5,000m) and one bronze (Barry Magee – Athletics, Men's Marathon) medals.

==== Winter Olympics ====
Gold	Silver	Bronze	Total
0	0	0	0

- New Zealand enters the Winter Olympics for the second time, with a team of four competitors.

=== Rugby league ===
- New Zealand national rugby league team
- Rugby League World Cup

=== Rugby union ===
- The All Blacks toured South Africa, losing the four-test series 2–1 with one game drawn.
  - 25 June, Ellis Park, Johannesburg: New Zealand 0 – 13 South Africa
  - 23 July, Newlands, Cape Town: New Zealand 11 – 3 South Africa
  - 13 Aug, Free State Stadium, Blomfontein: New Zealand 11 – 11 South Africa
  - 27 August, Boet Erasmus, Port Elizabeth: New Zealand 3 – 8 South
- Ranfurly Shield: Auckland managed successful defences against Thames Valley (22–6) and Counties (14–3) before losing to North Auckland, 17–11. North Auckland managed to defend the shield against Poverty Bay, (24–3) before losing 3–6 to Auckland. Auckland held the shield for the remainder of the season, beating Manawatu (31–8), Bay of Plenty (9–6), Wellington (22–9), Taranaki (25–6) and Canterbury (19–18).

=== Soccer ===
- The national men's team made a short tour to Tahiti.
  - 5 September, Papeete: NZ 5 – 1 Tahiti
  - 8 September, Papeete: NZ 8 – 0 Tahiti Juniors
  - 12 September, Papeete: NZ 2 – 1 Tahiti
- Chatham Cup won by North Shore United, who beat Technical Old Boys (of Christchurch) 5–3 in the final.
- Provincial league champions:
  - Auckland: North Shore United
  - Bay of Plenty: Kahukura
  - Buller: Waimangaroa United
  - Canterbury: Western
  - Franklin: Papatoetoe
  - Hawke's Bay: Napier Rovers
  - Manawatu: Kiwi United
  - Marlborough: Woodbourne
  - Nelson: Athletic
  - Northland: Otangarei United
  - Otago: Northern
  - Poverty Bay: Eastern Union
  - South Canterbury: Thistle
  - Southland: Invercargill Thistle
  - Taranaki: Moturoa
  - Waikato: Hamilton Technical OB
  - Wairarapa: YMCA
  - Wanganui: Blue Rovers
  - Wellington: Railways
  - West Coast: Cobden-Kohinoor

== Births ==
- 21 January: Phil Horne, cricketer
- 15 February: Michael James "Jock" Hobbs, rugby player and administrator
- 6 April: Richard Loe, rugby player
- 10 April – Rex Wilson, long-distance runner
- 2 May – Rhys Jones, New Zealand Army officer
- 14 May: Frank Nobilo, golfer
- 7 June: Lianne Dalziel, politician
- 15 July: Gary Robertson, cricketer
- 9 September: Chris White, rower
- 29 September: Tau Henare, politician
- 1 November: Jenny Bornholdt, poet
- 17 December: Steve Walsh, long jumper
- 26 December: Temuera Morrison, actor

== Deaths ==
- 17 January Andrew Kennaway Henderson, illustrator, cartoonist and pacifist. (b. 1879)
- 1 June Alfred Murdoch, politician. (b. 1877)
- 25 July Edgar Neale, politician. (b. 1889)
- 10 September: Sir Harold Gillies, plastic surgery pioneer (b. 1882)
- 8 October Sir William Polson, politician. (b. 1875)
- 29 November Sir Andrew Hamilton Russell, soldier. (b. 1868)

== See also ==
- List of years in New Zealand
- Timeline of New Zealand history
- History of New Zealand
- Military history of New Zealand
- Timeline of the New Zealand environment
- Timeline of New Zealand's links with Antarctica
