= 1957 in New Zealand =

- Decades: 1930s; 1940s; 1950s; 1960s; 1970s
- See also: History of New Zealand; List of years in New Zealand; Timeline of New Zealand history

The following lists events that happened during 1957 in New Zealand.

== Population ==
- Estimated population as of 31 December: 2,262,800.
- Increase since 31 December 1956: 53,600 (2.43%).
- Males per 100 females: 101.1.

== Incumbents ==
=== Regal and viceregal ===
- Head of State – Elizabeth II
- Governor-General – Lieutenant-General The Lord Norrie GCMG GCVO CB DSO MC followed by The Viscount Cobham GCMG TD.

=== Government ===
The 31st New Zealand Parliament continued. In power was the National government under Sidney Holland and later Keith Holyoake. The general election saw the Labour Party win by a narrow two-seat margin.

- Speaker of the House – Mathew Oram
- Prime Minister – Sidney Holland then Keith Holyoake then Walter Nash
- Deputy Prime Minister – Keith Holyoake then Jack Marshall then Jerry Skinner
- Minister of Finance – Jack Watts then Arnold Nordmeyer
- Minister of Foreign Affairs – Tom Macdonald then Walter Nash
- Chief Justice — Sir Harold Barrowclough

=== Parliamentary opposition ===
- Leader of the Opposition – Walter Nash (Labour) until 12 December, then Keith Holyoake (National).

=== Main centre leaders ===
- Mayor of Auckland – Thomas Ashby, then Keith Buttle
- Mayor of Hamilton – Roderick Braithwaite
- Mayor of Wellington – Frank Kitts
- Mayor of Christchurch – Robert M. Macfarlane
- Mayor of Dunedin – Leonard Morton Wright

== Events ==
- 20 January: Scott Base, New Zealand's main presence in Antarctica, is established by Sir Edmund Hillary.
- 24 May: the last Empire Day is commemorated.
- September: Former Member of Parliament and New Zealand ambassador to the United States Leslie Munro is appointed President of the United Nations General Assembly for its twelfth session, lasting until September 1958

== Arts and literature ==
See 1957 in art, 1957 in literature

=== Music ===
See: 1957 in music

=== Radio ===
See: Public broadcasting in New Zealand

- 1 October – Radio station 2ZC launches in Napier on 1280 kHz, supplementing station 2YZ.

=== Film ===
See: Category:1957 film awards, 1957 in film, List of New Zealand feature films, Cinema of New Zealand, Category:1957 films

== Sport ==
=== Athletics ===
Edwin Rye wins his second national title in the men's marathon, clocking 2:44:56 in Napier.

=== Chess ===
- The 64th National Chess Championship was held in Wellington. The title was shared by A. Feneridis of Wellington and J.R. Phillips of Auckland.

=== Horse racing ===
==== Harness racing ====
- New Zealand Trotting Cup – Lookaway
- Auckland Trotting Cup – Highland Air

=== Lawn bowls ===
The national outdoor lawn bowls championships are held in Auckland.

- Men's singles champion – James Pirret (Tuakau Bowling Club)
- Men's pair champions – H. Franks, L. Franks (skip) (Balmoral Bowling Club)
- Men's fours champions – F.M. Murray, W.W. Wearne, A.N. Callaghan, Ron Buchan (skip) (Tui Park Bowling Club)

=== Rugby union ===
- The All Blacks played two Test matches against Australia, retaining the Bledisloe Cup:
  - 25 May, Sydney Cricket Ground: New Zealand 25 – 11 Australia
  - 1 June, Exhibition Ground, Brisbane: New Zealand 22 – 9 Australia

=== Soccer ===
- The national men's team was host to two visiting club sides:
  - 22 June, Wellington: NZ 1 – 1 Eastern Athletic
  - 24 June, Auckland: NZ 2 – 1 Eastern Athletic
  - 27 June, Auckland: NZ 1 – 7 FK Austria
  - 3 August, Wellington: NZ 1 – 7 FK Austria
- The Chatham Cup is won by Seatoun who beat Technical Old Boys 3–1 in the final.
- Provincial league champions:
  - Auckland: Eastern Suburbs AFC
  - Bay of Plenty: Rangers
  - Buller: Millerton Thistle
  - Canterbury: Western
  - Hawke's Bay: Hastings Wanderers
  - Manawatu: Ohakea
  - Marlborough: Blenheim Rangers
  - Nelson: Athletic
  - Northland: Otangarei United
  - Otago: King Edward Technical College OB
  - Poverty Bay: Eastern Union
  - South Canterbury: Northern Hearts
  - Southland: Hotspurs
  - Taranaki: City
  - Waikato: Huntly Thistle
  - Wairarapa: Masterton Athletic
  - Wanganui: New Settlers
  - Wellington: Seatoun AFC

== Births ==
- 3 January – Dave Dobbyn, singer, songwriter
- 28 February – Ian Smith, cricketer
- 2 March – Stu Gillespie, cricketer
- 19 April – Wayne Smith, rugby player and coach
- 30 April – Tony Rogers, middle-distance runner
- 30 May – Allison Roe, athlete
- 20 June – Chester Borrows, politician (died 2023)
- 24 June – Elizabeth Fuller, children's book illustrator
- 26 June – Michael Laws, broadcaster, writer and politician
- 19 July – Tony Boyle, cricketer
- 27 July – Barbara Moore, long-distance runner
- 28 July – David Shearer, humanitarian worker and politician, was Leader of the Opposition (2011–2013)
- 11 August – Ruth Dyson, politician
- 31 August (in Kenya) – Luke Hurley, singer/songwriter
- 20 September – Michael Hurst, actor
- 10 October – Rod Donald, environmentalist and politician, co-leader of the Green Party of Aotearoa New Zealand (1995–2005) (died 2005)
- 29 November – Glenys Quick, long-distance runner
- 13 December – Buck Shelford, rugby player
- Richard Adams, violinist.
- George Bertrand, who became Georgina Beyer, transgender politician.
- Howard Broad, Commissioner of Police

== Deaths ==
- 2 January: William Aitchison, politician.
- 19 January: Thomas Brash, dairy industry leader and Presbyterian Church moderator.
- 21 January: Maurice Brownlie, rugby union player.
- 18 February: Walter James Bolton, last person executed in New Zealand.
- 2 April: Catherine Stewart, politician.
- 3 May: Daisy Osborn, artist.
- 17 September: Anton Bernhardt Julius Lemmer, music school director and conductor.
- 26 September: Thomas Ashby, serving mayor of Auckland.

== See also ==
- List of years in New Zealand
- Timeline of New Zealand history
- History of New Zealand
- Military history of New Zealand
- Timeline of the New Zealand environment
- Timeline of New Zealand's links with Antarctica

For world events and topics in 1957 not specifically related to New Zealand see: 1957
