= Cobley =

Cobley is a surname. Notable people with the surname include:

- Arthur Cobley (1874–1960), British cricketer
- David Cobley (born 1954), British painter
- Donald Cobley (1928–1999), British modern pentathlete
- James Cobley (1877–1958), Australian lawn bowler
- John Cobley (1872–1958), Australian lawn bowler
- Michael Cobley (born 1959), British science fiction writer

== See also ==
- Tutnall and Cobley, a civil parish in England
