= 1958 in New Zealand =

- Decades: 1930s; 1940s; 1950s; 1960s; 1970s
- See also: History of New Zealand; List of years in New Zealand; Timeline of New Zealand history

The following lists events that happened during 1958 in New Zealand.

== Population ==
- Estimated population as of 31 December: 2,316,000.
- Increase since 31 December 1957: 53,200 (2.35%).
- Males per 100 females: 101.3.

== Incumbents ==
=== Regal and viceregal ===
- Head of State – Elizabeth II
- Governor-General – The Viscount Cobham GCMG TD.

=== Government ===
The 32nd New Zealand Parliament commenced. In power was the newly elected Labour government led by Walter Nash.

- Speaker of the House – Robert Macfarlane.
- Prime Minister – Walter Nash.
- Deputy Prime Minister – Jerry Skinner.
- Minister of Finance – Arnold Nordmeyer.
- Minister of Foreign Affairs – Walter Nash.
- Attorney-General – Rex Mason.
- Chief Justice — Sir Harold Barrowclough

=== Parliamentary opposition ===
- Leader of the Opposition – Keith Holyoake (National).

=== Main centre leaders ===
- Mayor of Auckland – Keith Buttle
- Mayor of Hamilton – Roderick Braithwaite
- Mayor of Wellington – Frank Kitts
- Mayor of Christchurch – Robert Macfarlane then George Manning
- Mayor of Dunedin – Leonard Morton Wright

== Events ==
- 26 June – 'Black Budget', raising taxes on tobacco, alcohol and petrol, passed by second Labour government.
- June – New Zealand's first supermarket, Foodtown, opens at Ōtāhuhu.
- 3 September – Brian Barratt-Boyes performs New Zealand's first open heart surgery at Auckland's Green Lane Hospital.
- 29 September – The emergency number 111 for fire, police and ambulance is introduced; initially only in Masterton and Carterton.
- 19 October - A march of over six thousand people is held in Paraparaumu to mark the construction of the Our Lady of Lourdes statue.
- 15 November - The Wairakei Power Station is commissioned. It is New Zealand's first geothermal power station, and only the second large-scale geothermal power station in the world.
- United States base for Operation Deep Freeze is established at Christchurch Airport.

== Arts and literature ==
- The Robert Burns Fellowship is established to honour the bicentenary of the poet's birth.

See 1958 in art, 1958 in literature, Robert Burns Fellowship, Category:1958 books

=== Music ===
See: 1958 in music

=== Radio ===
See: Public broadcasting in New Zealand

- 17 March – Radio station 2XB (later 2ZD) launches in Masterton on 840 kHz.

=== Film ===
See: Category:1958 film awards, 1958 in film, List of New Zealand feature films, Cinema of New Zealand, Category:1958 films

== Sport ==
=== Athletics ===
- Ray Puckett wins his first national title in the men's marathon, clocking 2:37:28 in Lower Hutt.

=== British Empire and Commonwealth Games ===
Gold	Silver	Bronze	Total
4	6	9	19

=== Chess ===
- The 65th National Chess Championship was held in Christchurch, and was won by J.R. Phillips of Auckland.

=== Horse racing ===
==== Harness racing ====
- New Zealand Trotting Cup – False Step
- Auckland Trotting Cup – Macklin

=== Lawn bowls ===
The national outdoor lawn bowls championships are held in Christchurch.

- Men's singles champion – Phil Skoglund (Northern Bowling Club)
- Men's pair champions – C.J. Rogers, James Pirret (skip) (Tuakau Bowling Club)
- Men's fours champions – W.H. Woods, L.G. Donaldson, A. Connew, Pete Skoglund (skip) (Carlton Bowling Club)

=== Rugby union ===
- The All Blacks played three Test matches against the touring Australian side, retaining the Bledisloe Cup:
  - 23 August, Athletic Park (Wellington), Wellington: New Zealand 25 – 3 Australia
  - 6 September, Lancaster Park, Christchurch: New Zealand 3 – 6 Australia
  - 20 September, Epsom Showgrounds, Auckland: New Zealand 17 – 8 Australia

=== Soccer ===
- The national men's team played seven matches including five internationals:
  - 16 August, Wellington: NZ 2 – 3 Australia
  - 23 August, Auckland: NZ 2 – 2 Australia
  - 26 August, Hamilton: NZ 3 – 0 Waikato XI
  - 31 August, Nouméa: NZ 2 – 1 New Caledonia
  - 7 September, Nouméa: NZ 5 – 1 New Caledonia
  - 14 September, Nouméa: NZ 2 – 1 New Caledonia
  - 18 September, Auckland: NZ 1 – 1 Auckland
- The Chatham Cup was won by Seatoun for the second consecutive year. They beat Christchurch city 7–1 in the final.
- Provincial league champions:
  - Auckland: Onehunga
  - Bay of Plenty: Rangers
  - Buller: Millerton Thistle
  - Canterbury: Western
  - Hawke's Bay: Napier Athletic
  - Manawatu: Kiwi United
  - Marlborough: Spartans
  - Nelson: Settlers
  - Northland: Marlin Rovers
  - Otago: Northern
  - Poverty Bay: Eastern Union
  - South Canterbury: West End
  - Southland: Brigadiers
  - Taranaki: City
  - Waikato: Hamilton Technical OB
  - Wairarapa: Masterton Athletic
  - Wanganui: Wanganui Athletic
  - Wellington: Seatoun AFC

== Births ==
- 1 January: Lesley Murdoch, cricketer
- 7 February: Simon Upton, politician
- 30 March: Peter Ellis, convicted for child abuse (d. 2019)
- 15 April: John Bracewell, cricket player and coach
- 14 May:
  - Jools Topp, musician and comedian (d. 2026)
  - Lynda Topp, entertainer
- 16 May (in the U.S.A.): Thomas "Tab" Baldwin, basketball coach
- 27 May: Neil Finn, singer, songwriter
- 13 September: Philippa Werry, writer
- 14 September: Jeff Crowe, cricketer
- 27 September: Mitch Shirra, motorcycle speedway rider
- 17 November:
  - Frank van Hattum, soccer player
  - Glenn Dods, soccer player
- 23 November: Martin Snedden, cricketer and sports administrator
- 30 November: Barry Cooper, cricketer
- 2 December: Roger Sowry, politician
- A J Hackett, extreme sports entrepreneur
- (in Zambia): Vicky Jones, children's author
- Pio Terei, actor, singer and comedian
- Jane Wrightson, chief censor

Category:1958 births

== Deaths ==
- 12 March – Bill Barnard, politician, 10th Speaker of the House of Representatives
- 1 June – Fred Baker, soldier
- 2 June – Robert William Smith, politician
- 17 July – William Taverner, MP and mayor of Dunedin
- 27 July – William Montgomery Jr., politician
- 9 October – Merton Hodge, playwright
- 25 October – James Chapman-Taylor, architect

Category:1958 deaths

== See also ==
- List of years in New Zealand
- Timeline of New Zealand history
- History of New Zealand
- Military history of New Zealand
- Timeline of the New Zealand environment
- Timeline of New Zealand's links with Antarctica
