= 1966 World Outdoor Bowls Championship =

World lawn bowls event

Men's World Outdoor Championships 1966
- 1st Men's World Outdoor Bowls Championships
- Location: (Australia) Kyeemagh, New South Wales
- Date: 10–23 October 1966.
- Category: World Bowls Championship

The 1966 Men's World Outdoor Bowls Championship was the inaugural edition of the outdoor world championship. The event was held at Kyeemagh, New South Wales, Australia, from 10 to 23 October 1966.

David Bryant won the singles which was held in a round robin format.

The pairs and triples gold went to Australia which helped them win the overall team competition called the WM Leonard Cup. The fours gold was claimed by New Zealand.

== Medallists ==
Event	Gold	Silver	Bronze
Men's singles	(England); David Bryant	(Scotland); John Hershaw	Roy Fulton
Men's pairs	(Australia); Geoff Kelly; Bert Palm	(South Africa); Tommy Press; Norman Snowy Walker	(England); Cedric Smith; David Bryant
Men's triples	(Australia); Don Collins; Athol Johnson; John Dobbie	(Canada); Sandy Houston; Karl Beacom; John Henderson	(South Africa); Kelvin Lightfoot; Tommy Harvey; Leon Kessel
Men's fours	(New Zealand); Norm Lash; Ron Buchan; Gordon Jolly; Bill O'Neill	(Australia); Don Collins; Athol Johnson; John Dobbie; Bert Palm	(Scotland); Willie Adrain; Willie Dyet; Bert Thomson; Harry Reston
Men's Team	Australia	Scotland	England

== Results ==
=== Men's singles – round robin ===
Round	Date	Tie 1	Tie 2	Tie 3	Tie 4	Tie 5	Tie 6	Tie 7	Tie 8
Round 1	Oct 17	Eng 21 Jer 12	SAf 18 Ken 21	Nzl 21 Hkg 12	Rho 21 Aus 14	Sco 20 Ire 21	Can 18 Mwi 21	USA 21 Wal 17	Fij 21 PNG 14
Round 2	Oct 17	Eng 21 Ken 17	USA 21 SAf 12	Mwi 21 Nzl 19	Rho 19 Sco 21	Aus 21 Fij 8	Can 20 Hkg 21	Ire 13 Jer 21	Wal 21 PNG 13
Round 3	Oct 17	USA 9 Eng 21	Jer 13 SAf 21	Nzl 21 Can 12	Fij 8 Rho 21	Mwi 7 Aus 21	Sco 21 Wal 19	Ire 21 Ken 16	HKg 21 PNG 18
Round 4	Oct 19	MWi 12 USA 21	PNG 18 Ire 21	Fij 17 Nzl 21	Ken 21 Hkg 15	Jer 16 Sco 21	Wal 21 Rho 14	Can 10 Eng 21	SAf 21 Aus 10
Round 5	Oct 19	Eng 21 PNG 18	Sco 21 SAf 14	Nzl 21 Wal 20	Rho 21 USA 15	Aus 21 Hkg 20	Can 21 Ken 15	Ire 21 Fij 15	Jer 16 Mwi 21
Round 6	Oct 19	SAf 21 PNG 15	Nzl 21 Aus 14	Eng 21 Mwi 14	Rho 21 Ken 8	Sco 21 Hkg 17	Can 7 Fij 21	Ire 21 USA 10	Wal 21 Jer 5
Round 7	Oct 20	Rho 21 Jer 9	Can 21 PNG 11	Aus 21 Wal 17	Eng 21 Ire 13	SAf 21 Mwi 10	Nzl 21 Ken 14	Sco 21 Fij 15	USA 21 Hkg 18
Round 8	Oct 20	Nzl 17 Sco 21	USA 21 Ken 19	Jer 19 Can 21	Eng 21 Fij 5	SAf 10 Wal 21	Rho 9 Ire 21	Aus 11 PNG 21	Mwi 14 Hkg 21
Round 9	Oct 20	Hkg 16 Fij 21	Wal 21 Mwi 4	Rho 21 PNG 8	USA 20 Jer 21	Eng 21 Sco 18	SAf 21 Can 15	Nzl 13 Ire 21	Aus 21 Ken 9
Round 10	Oct 21	Ire 21 Wal 10	Can 5 USA 21	Sco 21 Ken 7	SAf 21 Fij 15	Eng 21 Hkg 8	Nzl 21 PNG 17	Rho 14 Mwi 21	Jer 7 Aus 21
Round 11	Oct 21	Sco 21 PNG 2	Rho 21 Can 12	Fij 21 Can 7	Eng 18 Wal 21	SAf 21 Hkg 12	Nzl 21 Jer 2	Aus 17 USA 21	Ire 21 Mwi 12
Round 12	Oct 22	Ken 21 PNG 16	Sco 19 Mwi 21	SAf 21 Ire 19	Nzl 21 USA 18	Eng 21 Aus 9	Rho 21 Hkg 13	Can 14 Wal 21	Jer 21 Fij 15
Round 13	Oct 22	Wal 21 Ken 18	Fij 21 Mwi 18	Aus 20 Sco 21	Can 8 Ire 21	Eng 21 Rho 19	SAf 21 Nzl 17	USA 21 PNG 18	Jer 12 Hkg 21
Round 14	Oct 23	PNG 21 Mwi 19	Sco 20 USA 21	Eng 21 Nzl 5	SAf 21 Rho 10	Aus 21 Can 16	Ire 21 Hkg 16	Jer 21 Ken 16	Wal 21 Fij 7
Round 15	Oct 23	Aus 21 Ire 12	Mwi 21 Ken 12	Sco 21 Can 15	Nzl 20 Rho 21	Eng 21 SAf 18	USA 21 Fij 14	Wal 21 Hkg 17	Jer 13 PNG 21

Pos	Player	P	W	L	F	A	Pts
1	(England) David Bryant	15	14	1	312	196	28
2	(Scotland) John Hershaw	15	11	4	308	245	22
3	Roy Fulton	15	11	4	288	231	22
4	(Wales) Maldwyn Evans	15	10	5	293	225	20
5	(South Africa) Norman Snowy Walker	15	10	5	282	243	20
6	(United States) Arthur Hartley	15	10	5	282	257	20
7	(Rhodesia) Bill Jackson	15	9	6	274	233	18
8	(Australia) Geoff Kelly	15	9	6	270	236	18
9	(New Zealand) Phil Skoglund	15	8	7	273	260	16
10	(Malawi) Harry Lakin	15	6	9	236	287	12
11	(Hong Kong) Augusto Pedro Pereira	15	4	11	248	295	8
12	(Kenya) Cliff de Rungary	15	4	11	235	285	8
13	(Jersey) Gordon Bewhay	15	4	11	210	295	8
14	(Fiji) Len Smales	15	4	11	208	286	8
15	(Papua New Guinea) Jack Spears	15	3	12	232	295	6
16	(Canada) Sandy Houston	15	3	12	215	297	6

=== Men's pairs – round robin ===
Section A

Round	Tie 1	Tie 2	Tie 3	Tie 4
Round 1	Eng 22 USA 12	Can 33 Ire 13	Ken 30 Jer 13	Nzl 34 Mwi 5
Round 2	Ken 13 Ire 21	USA 19 Nzl 12	Mwi 7 Eng 30	Can 37 Jer 10
Round 3	Mwi 21 USA 29	Eng 23 Can 12	Jer 17 Ire 26	Nzl 34 Ken 10
Round 4	Can 24 Mwi 13	Ire 14 Nzl 19	USA 27 Jer 17	Ken 16 Eng 24
Round 5	Jer 16 Nzl 20	Mwi 21 Ken 18	Eng 19 Ire 10	USA 9 Can 21
Round 6	Jer 4 Eng 26	Ken 16 USA 17	Ire 18 Mwi 12	Nzl 23 Can 17
Round 7	USA 22 Ire 17	Eng 18 Nzl 26	Can 20 Ken 14	Mwi 16 Jer 25

Pos	Player	P	W	D	L	F	A	Pts
1	(England) Cedric Smith & David Bryant	7	6	0	1	173	87	12
2	(New Zealand) Ron Buchan & Phil Skoglund	7	6	0	1	168	99	12
3	(Canada) Ray Reidel & Joe Dorsch	7	5	0	2	164	116	10
4	(United States) Ezra Wyeth & Arthur Hartley	7	5	0	2	135	126	10
5	Joe McPartland & Patrick McGuirk	7	3	0	4	119	135	6
6	(Kenya) Dennis Coombes & Cliff de Rungary	7	1	0	6	117	150	2
7	(Jersey) Gordon Bewhay & Cyril Cracknell	7	1	0	6	102	182	2
8	(Malawi) Harry Lakin & Jack Patterson	7	1	0	6	95	178	2

Section B

Round	Tie 1	Tie 2	Tie 3	Tie 4
Round 1	Rho 26 Sco 19	SAf 27 PNG 16	Aus 22 Wal 15	Fij 22 Hkg 18
Round 2	Aus 15 SAf 26	Fij 16 Sco 23	PNG 19 Wal 23	Rho 17 Hkg 15
Round 3	Fij 19 Rho 25	Hkg 25 Aus 12	Wal 16 SAf 19	Sco 20 PNG 14
Round 4	SAf 26 Hkg 21	Aus 37 Sco 12	PNG 13 Fij 30	Rho 12 Wal 18
Round 5	Fij 17 Aus 18	Rho 29 PNG 12	Wal 17 Hkg 15	Sco 24 SAf 10
Round 6	Aus 17 Rho 19	Wal 16 Sco 31	SAf 26 Fij 11	Hkg 22 PNG 15
Round 7	Sco 19 Hkg 19	Fij 27 Wal 14	PNG 13 Aus 34	Rho 18 SAf 14

Pos	Player	P	W	D	L	F	A	Pts
1	(Rhodesia) Geoff Knott & Bill Jackson	7	6	0	1	146	114	12
2	(South Africa) Tommy Press & Norman Snowy Walker	7	5	0	2	148	121	10
3	(Scotland) John Hershaw & Willie Adrain	7	4	1	2	148	138	9
4	(Australia) Geoff Kelly & Bert Palm	7	3	0	4	155	127	8
5	(Fiji) Len Smales & Gordon Maxwell	7	3	0	4	142	137	6
6	(Wales) Brian Maund & Aeron John	7	3	0	4	119	145	6
7	(Hong Kong) Eric Liddell & Augusto Pedro Pereira	7	2	1	4	135	128	5
8	(Papua New Guinea) Barry Welsh & Jack Spears	7	0	0	7	102	185	0

Final round

Round	Tie 1	Tie 2	Tie 3	Tie 4
Round 1	Eng 15 Aus 22	Nzl 10 Sco 18	Can 15 SAf 27	USA 12 Rho 19
Round 2	USA 17 SAf 21	Can 12 Rho 17	Nzl 25 Aus 26	Eng 18 Sco 15
Round 3	Eng 26 SAf 20	Nzl 18 Rho 15	Can 16 Aus 18	USA 18 Sco 20
Round 4	USA 25 Aus 24	Can 19 Sco 18	Nzl 15 SAf 17	Eng 18 Rho 16

Pos	Team	P	W	L	F	A	Pts
1	Australia	4	3	1	90	81	6+
2	South Africa	4	3	1	85	72	6
3	England	4	3	1	77	73	6
4	Scotland	4	2	2	71	65	4
5	Rhodesia	4	2	2	67	60	4
6	United States	4	1	3	72	84	2
7	New Zealand	4	1	3	68	76	2
8	Canada	4	1	3	62	80	2

+ Position decided on (shots for) if points are tied.

=== Men's triples – round robin ===
Section A

Round	Tie 1	Tie 2	Tie 3	Tie 4
Round 1	SAf 21 Wal 14	Can 20 Aus 18	Eng 27 Jer 23	PNG 24 Fij 15
Round 2	Eng 24 Fij 17	PNG 13 Aus 25	Can 17 SAf 24	Wal 24 Jer 16
Round 3	Aus 31 Eng 11	Jer 15 PNG 24	Can 14 Wal 31	SAf 34 Fij 13
Round 4	Wal 13 Aus 28	Fij 15 Can 25	Jer 7 SAf 48	Eng 31 PNG 19
Round 5	Can 12 Eng 29	PNG 24 Wal 19	SAf 29 Aus 12	Jer 17 Fij 23
Round 6	Jer 13 Can 22	Eng 14 Wal 13	Fij 18 Aus 25	SAf 30 PNG 12
Round 7	Eng 12 SAf 19	Wal 43 Fij 12	Can 27 PNG 13	Aus 33 Jer 18

Pos	Player	P	W	D	L	F	A	Pts
1	(South Africa) Kelvin Lightfoot, Tommy Harvey & Leon Kessel	7	7	0	0	203	87	14
2	(Australia) John Dobbie, Don Collins & Athol Johnson	7	5	0	2	172	120	10
3	(England) Bobby Stenhouse, Tom Brown & Mick Cooper	7	5	0	2	148	134	10
4	(Canada) Sandy Houston, Karl Beacom & John Henderson	7	4	0	3	137	143	8
5	(Wales) Maldwyn Evans, Ron Thomas & Jock Thompson	7	3	0	4	157	129	6
6	(Papua New Guinea) Alan Ramsbocham, Wally Jackson & Eric Carburn	7	3	0	4	129	162	6
7	(Fiji) Jock Noble, Peter Oates & Max Bay	7	1	0	6	113	192	2
8	(Jersey) Harold Lines, Arthur Crossley & Harold Tunwell	7	0	0	7	109	201	0

Section B

Round	Tie 1	Tie 2	Tie 3	Tie 4
Round 1	Hkg 23 Ire 17	Ken 23 Sco 20	Nzl 22 USA 14	Rho 25 Mwi 17
Round 2	Hkg 13 Nzl 31	USA 21 Rho 17	Mwi 18 Ken 17	Sco 18 Ire 18
Round 3	Rho 30 Ken 8	Nzl 18 Sco 17	Ire 11 USA 26	Hkg 20 Mwi 24
Round 4	Ire 17 Rho 22	USA 30 Hkg 21	Sco 22 Mwi 19	Ken 14 Nzl 25
Round 5	Mwi 20 Nzl 18	Ken 6 Ire 26	Rho 30 Hkg 17	Sco 17 USA 17
Round 6	Rho 12 Sco 28	USA 25 Mwi 14	Nzl 23 Ire 18	Hkg 25 Ken 8
Round 7	Ken 10 USA 21	Nzl 22 Rho 24	Sco 24 Hkg 18	Mwi 21 Ire 13

Pos	Player	P	W	D	L	F	A	Pts
1	(United States) Harold Esch, Ron Veitch & Jim Candelet	7	5	1	1	154	112	11
2	(Rhodesia) Cappie Royston, Edgar Morris & Ronnie Turner	7	5	0	2	160	130	10
3	(New Zealand) Norm Lash, Gordon Jolly & Bill O'Neill	7	5	0	2	159	120	10
4	(Scotland) Harry Reston, Willie Dyet & Bert Thomson	7	3	2	2	146	125	8
5	(Malawi) Alastair Davidson, Alexander Sandy Ross & Albert Hall	7	4	0	3	133	140	8
6	(Hong Kong) Eduardo Maria Remedios, Abdul Kitchell & Ronald Raymond Girard	7	2	0	5	137	164	4
7	Charlie Taylor, Cecil Beck & Roy Fulton	7	1	1	5	120	139	3
8	(Kenya) Malvin Katzler, Laurie Lawrence & Harry Smith	7	1	0	6	86	165	2

Final round

Round	Tie 1	Tie 2	Tie 3	Tie 4
Round 1	SAf 17 Sco 20	Aus 32 Nzl 9	Eng 9 Rho 21	Can 22 USA 22
Round 2	Can 35 Rho 10	Eng 17 USA 26	Aus 39 Sco 10	SAf 17 Nzl 26
Round 3	SAf 26 Rho 12	Aus 26 USA 24	Eng 16 Sco 15	Can 17 Nzl 22
Round 4	Can 25 Sco 17	Eng 23 Nzl 21	Aus 22 Rho 18	SAf 27 USA 20

Pos	Team	P	W	D	L	F	A	Pts
1	Australia	4	4	0	0	119	61	8
2	Canada	4	2	1	1	99	71	5
3	South Africa	4	2	0	2	87	78	4
4	New Zealand	4	2	0	2	78	89	4
5	England	4	2	0	2	65	83	4
6	United States	4	1	1	2	92	92	3
7	Scotland	4	1	0	3	62	97	2
8	Rhodesia	4	1	0	3	61	92	2

=== Men's fours – round robin ===
Section A

Round	Tie 1	Tie 2	Tie 3	Tie 4
Round 1	SAf 31 Ken 15	Jer 12 Wal 25	Nzl 20 Ire 18	Can 29 PNG 9
Round 2	PNG 20 Nzl 17	Wal 12 SAf 15	Ken 22 Can 12	Ire 34 Jer 5
Round 3	Wal 37 PNG 11	SAf 19 Ire 14	Nzl 13 Can 22	Jer 18 Ken 14
Round 4	Jer 9 Nzl 27	Wal 8 Can 23	Ken 8 Ire 35	PNG 10 SAf 34
Round 5	Nzl 24 Wal 18	PNG 19 Ken 28	Jer 5 SAf 32	Can 22 Ire 18
Round 6	PNG 30 Jer 11	Nzl 30 Ken 11	Can 24 SAf 12	Ire 9 Wal 29
Round 7	SAf 17 Nzl 23	Can 33 Jer 10	Ken 21 Wal 25	PNG 22 Ire 20

Pos	Player	P	W	D	L	F	A	Pts
1	(Canada) Ray Reidel, Joe Dorsch, John Henderson & Karl Beacom	7	6	0	1	165	92	12
2	(South Africa) Kelvin Lightfoot, Tommy Harvey, Tommy Press, Leon Kessel	7	5	0	2	160	103	10
3	(New Zealand) Norm Lash, Ron Buchan, Gordon Jolly & Bill O'Neill	7	5	0	2	154	115	10
4	(Wales) Aeron John, Brian Maund, Ron Thomas & Jock Thompson	7	4	0	3	154	115	8
5	(Papua New Guinea) Alan Ramsbocham, Barry Welsh, Wally Jackson & Eric Carburn	7	3	0	4	121	176	6
6	Charlie Taylor, Cecil Beck, Joe McPartland & Patrick McGuirk	7	2	0	5	148	125	4
7	(Kenya) Malvin Katzler, Laurie Lawrence, Dennis Coombes & Harry Smith	7	2	0	5	119	170	4
8	(Jersey) Harold Lines, Arthur Crossley, Harold Tunwell & Cyril Cracknell	7	1	0	6	70	195	2

Section B

Round	Tie 1	Tie 2	Tie 3	Tie 4
Round 1	Eng 22 Fij 22	Rho 12 USA 24	Aus 12 Sco 20	Mwi 18 Hkg 15
Round 2	USA 15 Aus 24	Sco 18 Eng 26	Fij 14 Mwi 21	Hkg 16 Rho 15
Round 3	Mwi 9 Sco 35	Eng 20 Hkg 20	Rho 22 Aus 23	USA 30 Fij 13
Round 4	Hkg 15 Aus 29	Rho 25 Fij 13	Sco 18 USA 15	Eng 27 Mwi 10
Round 5	Fij 11 Aus 30	Mwi 18 Rho 13	USA 20 Eng 14	Sco 28 Hkg 12
Round 6	Rho 13 Eng 25	Hkg 17 USA 18	Aus 22 Mwi 17	Fij 12 Sco 22
Round 7	Hkg 22 Fij 16	Eng 19 Aus 16	Rho 16 Sco 24	USA 23 Mwi 16

Pos	Player	P	W	D	L	F	A	Pts
1	(Scotland) Willie Adrain, Willie Dyet, Bert Thomson & Harry Reston	7	6	0	1	166	102	12
2	(Australia) Don Collins, Athol Johnson, John Dobbie & Bert Palm	7	5	0	2	156	119	10
3	(England) Bobby Stenhouse, Tom Brown, Mick Cooper & Cedric Smith	7	4	2	1	153	119	10
4	(United States) Harold Esch, Ron Veitch, Ezra Wyeth & Jim Candelet	7	5	0	2	145	114	10
5	(Malawi) Alastair Davidson, Jack Patterson, Alexander 'Sandy' Ross & Albert Hall	7	3	0	4	109	149	6
6	(Hong Kong) Eduardo Maria Remedios, Abdul Kitchell, Ronald Raymond Girard & Eric Liddell	7	2	1	4	117	145	5
7	(Rhodesia) Eddie White, Cappie Royston, Edgar Morris & Geoff Knott	7	1	0	6	116	143	2
8	(Fiji) Jock Noble, Peter Oates, Max Bay & Gordon Maxwell	7	0	1	6	101	172	1

Final round

Round	Tie 1	Tie 2	Tie 3	Tie 4
Round 1	Nzl 24 Aus 18	SAf 24 Eng 24	Sco 24 Wal 24	Can 25 USA 13
Round 2	Nzl 21 Sco 21	Aus 36 Wal 10	USA 22 SAf 17	Can 23 Eng 20
Round 3	Aus 28 Can 15	Sco 22 SAf 21	Nzl 25 USA 15	Wal 23 Eng 18
Round 4	Sco 26 Can 13	Aus 21 SAf 20	Nzl 23 Egn 17	USA 18 Wal 14

Pos	Team	P	W	D	L	F	A	Pts
1	New Zealand	4	3	1	0	93	71	7
2	Australia	4	3	0	1	103	69	6
3	Scotland	4	2	2	0	93	79	6
4	Canada	4	2	0	2	76	87	4
5	United States	4	2	0	2	68	81	4
6	Wales	4	1	1	2	71	96	3
7	South Africa	4	0	1	3	82	89	1
8	England	4	0	1	3	79	93	1

=== W. M. Leonard Trophy ===
The scoring for the overall team title was four points for the winner of an event, three points for the runner-up, two points for third place and one point for fourth place.

Pos	Team	Singles	Pairs	Triples	Fours	Total
1	Australia	0	4	4	3	11
2	Scotland	3	1	0	2	6
3	England	4	2	0	0	6
4	South Africa	0	3	2	0	5
5	New Zealand	0	0	1	4	5
6	Canada	0	0	3	1	4
7	Ireland	2	0	0	0	2
8	Wales	1	0	0	0	1
