= Lawn bowls at the 1950 British Empire Games =

- Venue: Carlton Green Bowling Club & Remuera Bowling Club
- Location: Auckland, New Zealand
- Dates: 4 February – 11 February 1950
- Competitors: 29 from 5 nations

Lawn bowls at the 1950 British Empire Games was the fourth appearance of the Lawn bowls at the Commonwealth Games.

Competition at the 1950 British Empire Games took place in Auckland, New Zealand, from 4 to 11 February 1950.

The events took place at two locations; the Carlton Green Bowling Club in Epsom (which was located on Alpers Avenue at the time) and the Remuera Bowling Club on Market Road.

New Zealand topped the medal table by winning two of the three gold medals available.

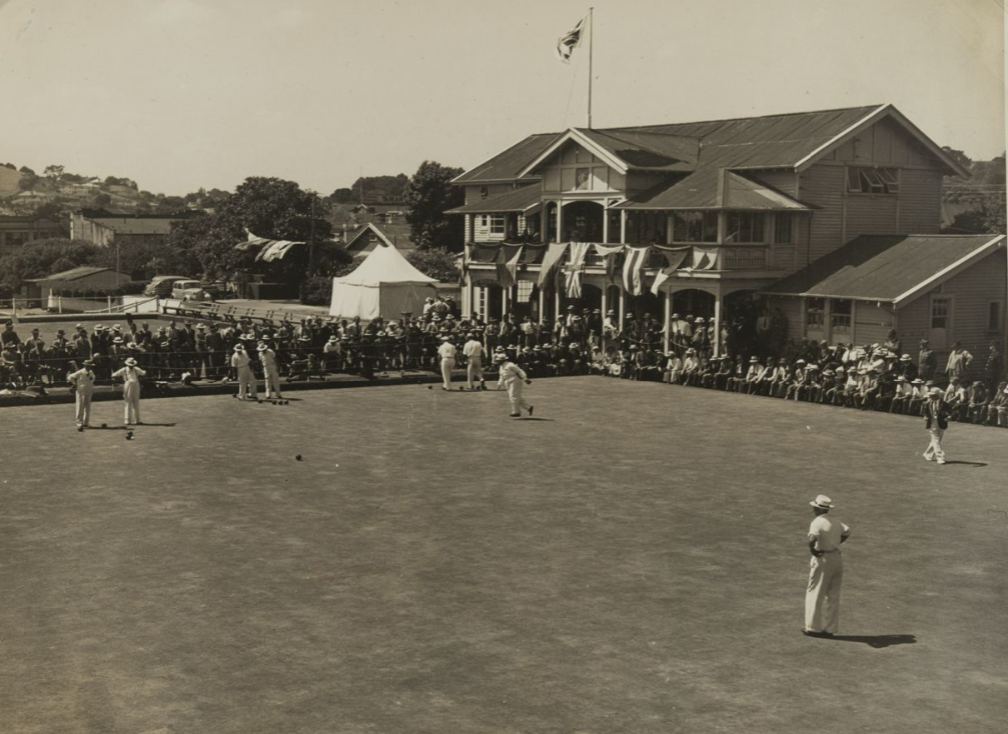
1950 British Empire Games, Carlton Bowling Club men's pairs match Auckland Libraries Heritage Collections

== Medal table ==
* Host nation (New Zealand)

Medals for lawn bowls by nation, ranked by number of golds—sortable
| Rank | Nation | Gold | Silver | Bronze | Total |
|---|---|---|---|---|---|
| 1 | New Zealand* | 2 | 0 | 1 | 3 |
| 2 | South Africa | 1 | 1 | 0 | 2 |
| 3 | Australia | 0 | 2 | 0 | 2 |
| 4 | Fiji | 0 | 0 | 2 | 2 |
| Totals (4 entries) | | 3 | 3 | 3 | 9 |

== Medallists ==
Medallists for lawn bowls by event
| Event | Gold | Silver | Bronze |
|---|---|---|---|
| Singles | (New Zealand) James Pirret | (Australia) Albert Newton | (Fiji) Lionel Garnett |
| Pairs | (New Zealand) Phil Exelby and Robert Henry | (South Africa) W. Gibb and H. J. van Zyl | (Fiji) Leslie Brown and James Poulton |
| Fours | (South Africa) Alfred Blumberg; Herbert Currer; Harry Atkinson; Norman Snowy Walker | (Australia) Charles Cordaiy; James Cobley; John Cobley; Len Knight | (New Zealand) Fred Russell; Arthur Engebretsen; Noel Jolly; Pete Skoglund |

== Results ==
=== Men's singles – round robin ===
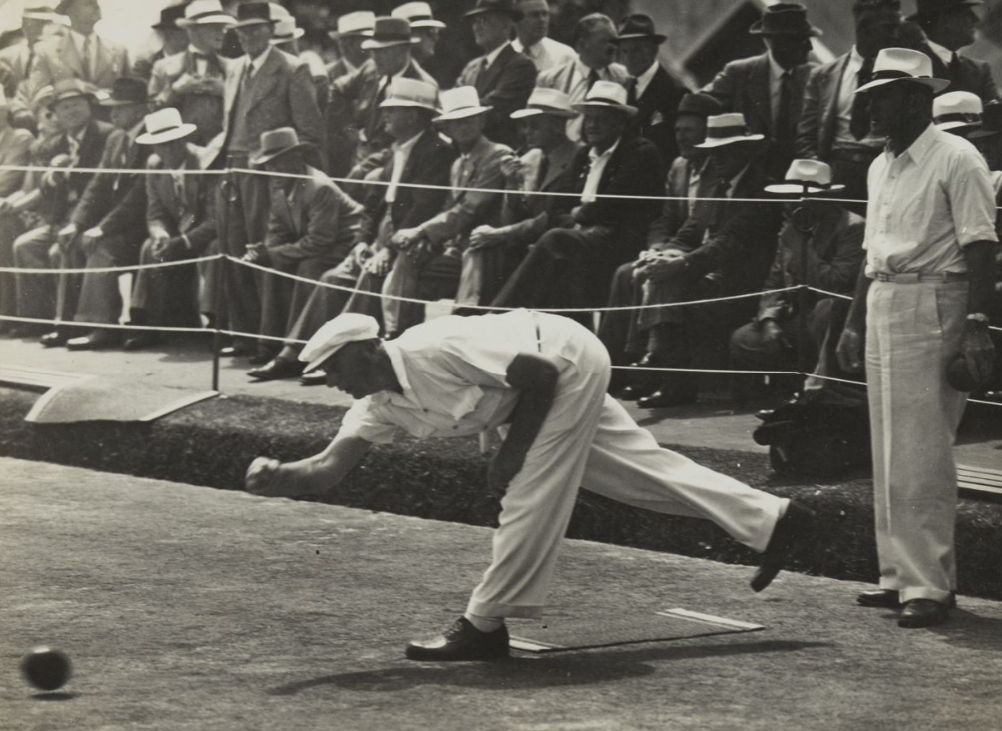
1950 British Empire Games, Carlton Bowling Club men's singles Weston Krupp bowls, James Pirret standing Auckland Libraries Heritage Collections

Men's singles round robin results
| Round | Date | Tie 1 | Tie 2 |
|---|---|---|---|
| Round 1 | Feb 6 | Aus 25 SAf 18 | Nzl 25 Fij 20 |
| Round 2 | Feb 6 | Fij 26 Can 21 | N/A |
| Round 3 | Feb 7 | Aus 26 Fij 18 | Can 26 SAf 19 |
| Round 4 | Feb 7 | Nzl 25 Can 22 | N/A |
| Round 5 | Feb 8 | Nzl 26 Aus 16 | Fij 26 SAf 17 |
| Round 6 | Feb 8 | Nzl 25 SAf 10 | Aus 25 Can 18 |

Men's singles round robin ranking
| Pos | Player | P | W | L | F | A | Pts |
|---|---|---|---|---|---|---|---|
| 1 | (New Zealand) James Pirret Jr. | 4 | 4 | 0 | 101 | 68 | 8 |
| 2 | (Australia) Albert Newton | 4 | 3 | 1 | 92 | 80 | 6 |
| 3 | (Fiji) Lionel Garnett | 4 | 2 | 2 | 89 | 89 | 4 |
| 4 | (Canada) Dr Weston Krupp | 4 | 1 | 3 | 87 | 94 | 2 |
| 5 | (South Africa) G Jacobs | 4 | 0 | 4 | 64 | 102 | 0 |

=== Men's pairs – round robin ===
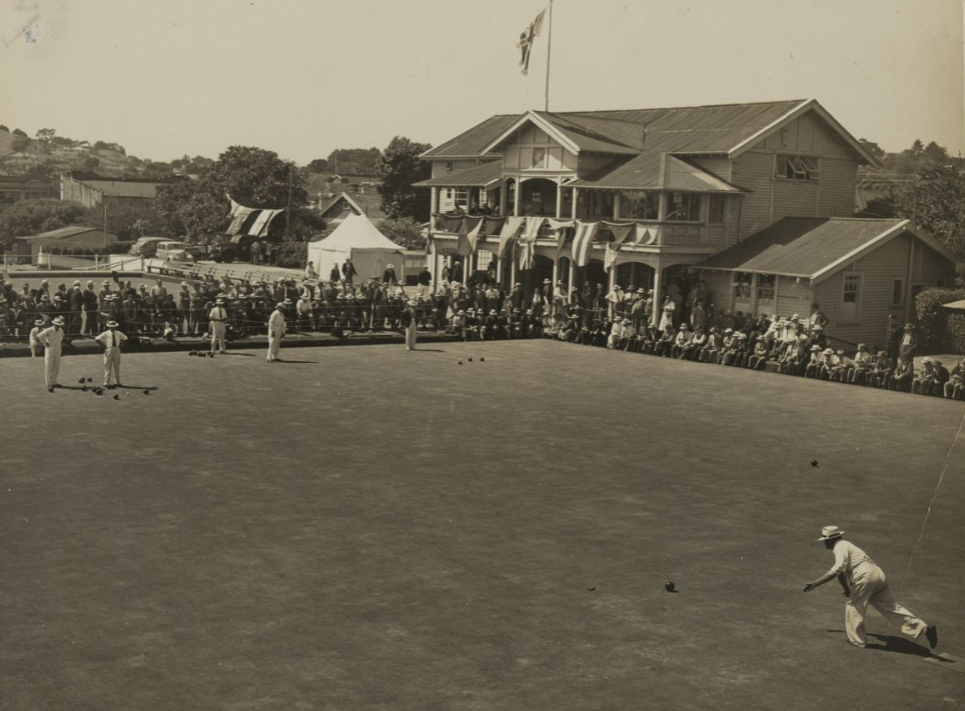
1950 British Empire Games, Carlton Bowling Club men's fours match, Pete Skoglund of New Zealand bowling Auckland Libraries Heritage Collections

Men's pairs round robin results
| Round | Date | Tie 1 | Tie 2 |
|---|---|---|---|
| Round 1 | Feb 6 | Nzl 23 SAf 16 | Fij 23 Aus 21 |
| Round 2 | Feb 7 | SAf 15 Fij 14 | Nzl 23 Aus 22 |
| Round 3 | Feb 8 | SAf 19 Aus 17 | Nzl 47 Fij 14 |

Men's pairs round robin ranking
| Pos | Player | P | W | L | F | A | Pts |
|---|---|---|---|---|---|---|---|
| 1 | (New Zealand) Robert Henry & Phil Exelby | 3 | 3 | 0 | 93 | 42 | 6 |
| 2 | (South Africa) W. Gibb & H. J. van Zyl | 3 | 2 | 1 | 50 | 54 | 4 |
| 3 | (Fiji) Leslie Brown & James Poulton | 3 | 1 | 2 | 41 | 83 | 2 |
| 4 | (Australia) Bert Palm & Robert Lewis | 3 | 0 | 3 | 60 | 65 | 0 |

=== Men's fours – round robin ===
Men's fours round robin results
| Round | Date | Tie 1 | Tie 2 |
|---|---|---|---|
| Round 1 | Feb 6 | Aus 44 Fij 8 | Nzl 19 SAf 11 |
| Round 2 | Feb 7 | Aus 23 Nzl 14 | SAf bt Fiji |
| Round 3 | Feb 8 | Nzl 41 Fij 6 | SAf 25 Aus 15 |

Men's fours round robin ranking
| Pos | Player | P | W | L | F | A | Pts |
|---|---|---|---|---|---|---|---|
| 1 | (South Africa) Norman Snowy Walker (skip), Herbert Currer, Harry Atkinson, Alfred Blumberg | 3 | 2 | 1 | 50 | 48 | 4+ |
| 2 | (Australia) James Cobley (skip), John Cobley, Len Knight, Charles Cordaiy | 3 | 2 | 1 | 82 | 46 | 4 |
| 3 | (New Zealand) Pete Skoglund (skip), Noel Jolly, Fred Russell, Arthur Engebretsen | 3 | 2 | 1 | 74 | 40 | 4 |
| 4 | (Fiji) Patrick Costello (skip), Nathaniel Stuart Chalmers, Harold Brockett Gibson, Eric Hastings McIlwain | 3 | 0 | 3 | 28 | 100 | 0 |

+ Play Offs
Eliminator - South Africa beat New Zealand 22-17
Final - South Africa beat Australia 23-14

== See also ==
- List of Commonwealth Games medallists in lawn bowls
- Lawn bowls at the Commonwealth Games
