= Herbert Currer =

South African bowler and footballer (born 1916)

Personal information
- Nationality: South Africa
- Born: 11 June 1916 Pretoria, South Africa

Sport
- Sport: lawn bowls & football
- Club: Pretoria West BC; Arcadia Shepherds F.C. Aberdeen F.C.
Medal record
Representing South Africa
Commonwealth Games
Gold medal – first place	1950 Auckland	fours

Herbert Oswald Currer (born 11 June 1916) was a South African international lawn bowler and professional footballer.

== Bowls career ==
Currer who was born in Pretoria in 1916. He won a gold medal at the 1950 British Empire Games in the rinks (fours) event with Alfred Blumberg, Harry Atkinson and Norman Snowy Walker.

Currer won the 1952 singles and two rinks titles at the National Championships in Port Elizabeth, bowling for the Pretoria West Bowls Club.

== Football career ==
Known as 'Herb', he played right-half and was signed by Aberdeen F.C. from Arcadia Shepherds F.C. on 9 December 1936 but did not arrive in Scotland until 23 July 1937 after sailing from South Africa with other members of the Aberdeen team following their tour of South Africa. He lived at 13 Fonthill Road, Aberdeen.

== Personal life ==
In 1940 he returned to South Africa by which time he was listed as being an engineer by trade living, formerly of 189 Union Street. He then began bowling for the Pretoria West Bowls Club but it is probable that he was introduced to bowls during his time in Scotland.
