= Tommy Harvey =

South African international lawn bowler (born 1933)

Personal information
- Nationality: South Africa
- Born: 1933 (age 92–93)

Sport
- Club: Belgravia BC and Southern Transvaal
Medal record
Representing South Africa
World Outdoor Championships
Bronze medal – third place	1966 Kyeemagh	triples
Bronze medal – third place	1972 Worthing	singles
Bronze medal – third place	1972 Worthing	pairs
Silver medal – second place	1972 Worthing	team

Thomas Andrew Harvey (born 1933) is a South African international lawn bowler.

== Bowls career ==
He competed in the first World Bowls Championship in Kyeemagh, New South Wales, Australia in 1966 and won a bronze medal in the triples with Kelvin Lightfoot and Leon Kessel at the event.

Six years later he secured two bronze medals; one in the singles and another in the pairs with Brian Ellwood at the 1972 World Outdoor Bowls Championship in Worthing. He also won a silver medal in the team event (Leonard Trophy).

== Family ==
His father Horace Harvey won the singles title at the 1938 British Empire Games and his grandfather Andrew Harvey competed in the pairs competition at the 1934 British Empire Games.

== Personal life ==
He was a business partner in sports goods by trade.
