= Geoff Knott =

Rhodesian international lawn bowler (born 1920)

Personal information
- Nationality: Rhodesia
- Born: 1920 India

Sport
- Sport: Lawn bowls
- Club: Salisbury Sports Club

Geoff L. Knott (born 1920) is a former Rhodesian international lawn bowler.

== Bowls career ==
Knott represented Rhodesia at table tennis before taking up lawn bowls. In 1966 he represented Rhodesia in the pairs with Bill Jackson at the 1966 World Outdoor Bowls Championship in Kyeemagh, New South Wales. The pair caused a surprise by winning their section and qualifying for the playoffs. However in the final group they just failed to earn a medal finishing equal fourth place. He was the 1963 National champion.

== Personal life ==
Knott worked for the Ministry of Roads and Road Traffic by trade.
