= Kelvin Roy =

Kelvin Roy-Gapper
- Born: Flint, Michigan
- Instruments: bass trumpet, trombone, piano, percussion
- Years active: 1990–present
- Label: Martian Music
- Website: kelvinroy-gapper.com

Kelvin Roy is an independent New Zealand-based composer and music producer of live and recorded music. He is also an author, as Kelvin Roy-Gapper, focusing particularly on aphorisms. With a background in jazz, and more recently, children's educational music. He has played in numerous groups including BlueStars, The Jews Brothers Band, Nairobi Trio, Twin City Stompers and several Latin American-inspired bands. Born to a New Zealand father in Flint, Michigan, USA, Kelvin performed in popular funk and jazz bands across the United States, from the midwest to Louisiana, and California, before making New Zealand his home. Kelvin has recorded with Jews Brothers, BlueStars, Gyrotayshin, and in 1997 released a solo album entitled inner space under the label Martian Music. He followed this up with just can't stop.

The album received kudos from both US and New Zealand radio stations, and he went on to release the Times of Our Lives CD and single, which featured on the SmoothJazz.com playlist for over two years.

One of the albums Kelvin produced with BlueStars, Around the World of Music Live at the Loaded Hog, charted at number #1 on the local radio station KAFM in Grand Junction, Colorado and played on many CMJ Network stations in the USA. The Loaded Hog, the venue of the live recording, was a regular host to Kelvin and BlueStars for over three years. He also continued the BlueStars Band in Australia.

Back in New Zealand, he has released 13 albums of children's music. His hit song ‘Countdown’ was nominated for Children's Song of the Year in 2012. The albums focus on a key theme (such as animals, conservation, activities and values) and emphasise everything from dance and movement to soothing sounds. In 2016, he released the Overlap album with Nigel Gavin, which is middle eastern and New Zealand inspired jazz instrumental. He has gone on to release several further jazz-pop albums, including Continuum in 2025.

Kelvin plays bass trumpet, and he also sings, plays keyboards, percussion and trombone.

He is currently a member of Napier-based Dixieland Jazz band, the Twin City Stompers.

== Bibliography ==
In 2018, Kelvin Roy (under the name Kelvin Roy-Gapper) published his first book, Aphorisms: Gifted One-Liners.

His other titles include:

- Circles and Arrows: Shapes in a Word (2023)
- Dancing Words (2023)
- Melodic Words: The Musical Lyrics Of Kelvin Roy (2025)
- Musings and Musickings: Causal Communiqués, Essays and Aphorisms (2026)

== Discography ==
- Growing Up in the New Clear Age*
- M001 InnerSpace
- M002 Just can't Stop
- M003 Times of Our Lives
- M004 Around the World of Music Live at the Loaded Hog
- M005 Animals
- M006 AquAnimals
- M007 AquAnimals 2
- M008 Grooving with the Animals
- M009 Endangered Downunder
- M010 Soothing Flora & Fauna
- M011 Jollytime
- M012 Holidays
- M013 Things we Love to Do
- M014 Amazing Animals
- M015 Overlap
- M017 Birds
- M018 Magic of Nature
- M019 Funny Animals
- M020 Lying In Wait
- M021 New Life
- M022 Continuum
