= Sandy Houston =

Canadian international lawn bowler

Personal information
- Nationality: Canada
- Born: c. 1894 Torbanlea, Australia
- Died: 1976 aged 82 Texas USA

Sport
- Club: British Columbia
Medal record
Representing Canada
World Outdoor Championships
Silver medal – second place	1966 Kyeemagh	triples

Alexander 'Sandy' Houston (born c. 1894, date of death unknown) was a Canadian international lawn bowler.

Houston was born in Torbanlea, Australia before moving to Scotland in 1902 and then Canada in 1922. He competed in the first World Bowls Championship in Kyeemagh, New South Wales, Australia in 1966 and won a silver medal in the triples with Karl Beacom and John Henderson at the event.
