= Norm Lash =

New Zealand international lawn bowler

Personal information
- Nationality: New Zealand
- Born: 1914
- Died: 2002 (aged 87–88) Nelson, New Zealand

Sport
- Club: Carlton BC; Hutt BC
Medal record
Representing New Zealand
World Outdoor Championships
Gold medal – first place	1966 Kyeemagh	fours

Norman Lash (1914 – 2002) was a New Zealand international lawn bowler.

== Bowls career ==
He competed in the first World Bowls Championship in Kyeemagh, New South Wales, Australia in 1966 and won a gold medal in the fours with Ron Buchan, Gordon Jolly and Bill O'Neill at the event.

He won the 1965 & 1977 pairs title and 1963 fours title at the New Zealand National Bowls Championships when bowling for the Carlton and Hutt Bowls Clubs.
