= Bert Thomson (bowls) =

Scottish international lawn bowler

Personal information
- Nationality: Scotland
- Born: 1927

Sport
- Club: Deans-Livingston Station BC and West Lothian
Medal record
Representing Scotland
World Outdoor Championships
Bronze medal – third place	1966 Kyeemagh	fours
Silver medal – second place	1966 Kyeemagh	team

Robert Thomson (born 1927) is a Scottish international lawn bowler.

== Bowls career ==
Thomson competed in the first World Bowls Championship in Kyeemagh, New South Wales, Australia in 1966 and won a bronze medal in the fours with Willie Adrain, Willie Dyet and Harry Reston at the event. He also won a silver medal in the team event (Leonard Trophy).
