= Don Collins (bowls) =

Australian lawn bowler

Personal information
- Nationality: Australia
- Born: 1927 26 June 2010

Sport
- Sport: Lawn bowls
- Club: Grange & Salisbury BC's and South Australia
Medal record
Representing Australia
World Outdoor Championships
| Gold medal – first place | 1966 Kyeemagh | triples |
| Silver medal – second place | 1966 Kyeemagh | fours |
| Gold medal – first place | 1966 Kyeemagh | team |

Don Collins (1927–2010) was an Australian international lawn bowler.

== Bowls career ==
He competed in the first World Bowls Championship in Kyeemagh, New South Wales, Australia in 1966 and won a gold medal in the triples with Athol Johnson and John Dobbie and a silver medal in the fours. He also won a gold medal in the team event (Leonard Trophy).

== Awards ==
He was inducted into the South Australian Hall of Fame in 2012 two years after his death in 2010.
