= Willie Adrain =

Scottish lawn bowler

Personal information
- Nationality: British (Scottish)
- Born: 26 January 1926 Dreghorn, Scotland
- Died: 19 November 1997 (aged 71) Dreghorn, Scotland

Sport
- Sport: Lawn bowls
- Club: Dreghorn BC, Irvine and Ayrshire
Medal record
Representing Scotland
World Outdoor Championships
Bronze medal – third place	1966 Kyeemagh	fours
Silver medal – second place	1966 Kyeemagh	team

William "Willie" Adrain (26 January 1926 – 19 November 1997) was a Scottish international lawn bowler.

== Biography ==
Adrain started playing bowls aged 12 after being introduced to the sport by his father James, who was a bowls greenkeeper at the Dreghorn Bowling Club. His uncle also called Willie was a Scottish international. Subsequently, Willie became a member of the Dreghorn club.

He competed in the first World Bowls Championship in Kyeemagh, New South Wales, Australia in 1966 and won a bronze medal in the fours with Willie Dyet, Bert Thomson and Harry Reston at the event. He also won a silver medal in the team event (Leonard Trophy).

Adrain represented the Scottish team at the 1978 Commonwealth Games in Edmonton, Canada, where he competed in the fours event, with Doug Copland, John Fleming and Dick Bernard.

He also won the 1963 Scottish National Bowls Championships singles title.

== Personal life ==
His own son George Adrain was a commonwealth and two times world champion.
