= 1959 in New Zealand =

- Decades: 1930s; 1940s; 1950s; 1960s; 1970s
- See also: History of New Zealand; List of years in New Zealand; Timeline of New Zealand history

The following lists events that happened during 1959 in New Zealand.

== Population ==
- Estimated population as of 31 December: 2,359,700.
- Increase since 31 December 1958: 43,700 (1.89%).
- Males per 100 females: 101.0.

== Incumbents ==
=== Regal and viceregal ===
- Head of State – Elizabeth II
- Governor-General – The Viscount Cobham GCMG TD.

=== Government ===
The 32nd New Zealand Parliament continued. In power was the Labour government led by Walter Nash.

- Speaker of the House – Robert Macfarlane
- Prime Minister – Walter Nash
- Deputy Prime Minister – Jerry Skinner.
- Minister of Finance – Arnold Nordmeyer.
- Minister of Foreign Affairs – Walter Nash.
- Attorney-General – Rex Mason.
- Chief Justice — Sir Harold Barrowclough

=== Parliamentary opposition ===
- Leader of the Opposition – Keith Holyoake (National).

=== Main centre leaders ===
- Mayor of Auckland – Keith Buttle then Dove-Myer Robinson
- Mayor of Hamilton – Roderick Braithwaite then Denis Rogers
- Mayor of Wellington – Frank Kitts
- Mayor of Christchurch – George Manning
- Mayor of Dunedin – Leonard Morton Wright then Stuart Sidey

== Events ==
- 30 May –The Auckland Harbour Bridge is opened.
- 1 June – During exploratory oil drilling at Kapuni in South Taranaki, drillers appear to strike natural gas.
- 24 November – The coastal trader MV Holmglen sinks near Timaru with the loss of 15 lives.

== Arts and literature ==
- Ian Cross wins the first Robert Burns Fellowship.

See 1959 in art, 1959 in literature

=== Music ===
See: 1959 in music

=== Radio ===
See: Public broadcasting in New Zealand

=== Film ===
See: Category:1959 film awards, 1959 in film, List of New Zealand feature films, Cinema of New Zealand, Category:1959 films

== Sport ==
=== Athletics ===
Ray Puckett wins his second national title in the men's marathon, clocking 2:27:28.2 on 7 March in Palmerston North.

=== Chess ===
- The 66th National Chess Championship was held in Hamilton. The title was shared between F.A. Foulds and B.C. Menzies, both of Auckland.

=== Horse racing ===
==== Harness racing ====
- New Zealand Trotting Cup – False Step (2nd win)
- Auckland Trotting Cup – Scottish Command

=== Lawn bowls ===
The national outdoor lawn bowls championships are held in Wellington.

- Men's singles champion – W.R. Fleming Sr (Tuakau Bowling Club)
- Men's pair champions – G. Bradley, H.J. Thompson (skip) (Whitiora Bowling Club)
- Men's fours champions – T. Sunde, C. Hill, A. Sunde, M.A. Marinovich (skip) (Oratia Bowling Club)

=== Rugby union ===
- The British Lions team toured New Zealand, losing the Test series 3–1. They also lost two of their 21 provincial games, to Canterbury and Otago.
  - 18 July, Carisbrook, Dunedin: New Zealand 18 – 17 British Isles
  - 15 August, Athletic Park, Wellington: New Zealand 11 – 8 British Isles
  - 29 August, Lancaster Park, Christchurch: New Zealand 22 – 8 British Isles
  - 19 September, Eden Park, Auckland: New Zealand 6 – 9 British Isles

=== Soccer ===
- The national men's team played one match against a visiting Costa Rican club side:
  - 6 June, Auckland: NZ 3 – 2 Deportivo Saprissa
- The Chatham Cup was won by Dunedin team Northern who beat North Shore United 3–2 in the final.
- Provincial league champions:
  - Auckland: North Shore United
  - Bay of Plenty: Kahukura
  - Buller: Denniston Hotspurs
  - Canterbury: Western
  - Hawke's Bay: Napier Athletic
  - Manawatu: Kiwi United
  - Marlborough: Woodbourne
  - Nelson: Rangers
  - Northland: Otangarei United
  - Otago: Northern
  - Poverty Bay: Eastern Union
  - South Canterbury: West End
  - Southland: Rovers
  - Taranaki: Moturoa
  - Waikato: Hamilton Technical OB
  - Wairarapa: Douglas Villa
  - Wanganui: New Settlers
  - Wellington: Northern

== Births ==
- 13 April: Justin Boyle , cricketer.
- 8 May: Ingrid Jagersma, cricketer.
- 9 May: Andrew Jones , cricketer.
- 16 May: Greg Johnston, rower.
- 26 May: Brett Austin , breaststroke swimmer.
- 28 May: Eric Verdonk, rower.
- 17 June: Vivienne Gapes, skier.
- 20 August: David Howard, poet.
- 4 September: Robbie Deans , rugby player and coach.
- 14 September: Brendon Bracewell , cricketer.
- 27 September: Mark Inglis , mountaineer.
- 3 November: Vaughan Brown , cricketer.
- 12 December: George Keys, rower.
- Bianca van Rangelrooy , artist.
- Harry Sinclair , actor, filmmaker and musician.

== Deaths ==
- 23 February: Gordon Wilson, Government architect.
- 8 April: Sir Bill Jordan, politician and diplomat.
- 8 June: George Dash, politician
- 7 November: Archie Fisher, painter.
- 8 November: Walter William Massey, MP and politician
- 6 December (in Scotland): Edward Hunter a.k.a. Billy Banjo, trade unionist, politician and writer.

== See also ==
- List of years in New Zealand
- Timeline of New Zealand history
- History of New Zealand
- Military history of New Zealand
- Timeline of the New Zealand environment
- Timeline of New Zealand's links with Antarctica
