= Leon Kessel =

Personal information
- Nationality: South Africa
- Born: 1911
- Died: 2001 (aged 89–90)

Sport
- Club: Reading Country Club, Alberton and Southern Transvaal
Medal record
Representing South Africa
World Outdoor Championships
Bronze medal – third place	1966 Kyeemagh	triples

Leon Kessel (1911–2001) was a South African international lawn bowler and team manager.

He competed in the first World Bowls Championship in Kyeemagh, New South Wales, Australia in 1966 and won a bronze medal in the triples with Kelvin Lightfoot and Tommy Harvey at the event.

He was the team manager of the all-conquering South African team during the 1976 World Outdoor Bowls Championship.
