= Karl Beacom =

Canadian international lawn bowler

Personal information
- Nationality: Canada
- Born: July 12, 1938 Ontario
- Died: September 10, 2015 (aged 77)

Sport
- Club: Balmy Beach BC
Medal record
Representing Canada
World Outdoor Championships
Silver medal – second place	1966 Kyeemagh	triples

Karl John David Beacom (July 12, 1938 – September 10, 2015) was a Canadian international lawn bowler.

He competed in the first World Bowls Championship in Kyeemagh, New South Wales, Australia in 1966 and won a silver medal in the triples with John Henderson and Sandy Houston at the event.
