= Willie Dyet =

Scottish international lawn bowler (born 1931)

Personal information
- Nationality: Scottish
- Born: 21 March 1931 (age 95) Edinburgh, Scotland

Sport
- Sport: Lawn bowls
- Club: Balerno, Edinburgh & Leith County
Medal record
Representing Scotland
World Outdoor Championships
Bronze medal – third place	1966 Kyeemagh	fours
Silver medal – second place	1966 Kyeemagh	team
British Isles Championships
Gold medal – first place	1973	pairs
Gold medal – first place	1976	fours

William Dyet (born 21 March 1931) is a Scottish international lawn bowler.

== Bowls career ==
Dyet competed in the first World Bowls Championship in Kyeemagh, New South Wales, Australia in 1966 and won a bronze medal in the fours with Willie Adrain, Bert Thomson and Harry Reston at the event.

He is a five times national champion having won the 1964, 1971 and 1975 fours titles, the 1972 pairs title and the 1990 triples at the Scottish National Bowls Championships when bowling for the Balerno Bowls Club.

== Personal life ==
Dyet was a refrigeration engineer by trade. He took up bowls aged 15.
