= Tommy Press =

South African international lawn bowler

Personal information
- Nationality: South Africa

Sport
- Sport: lawn bowls
- Club: Pretoria BC; Roodepoort BC and Eastern Transvaal
Medal record
Representing South Africa
World Outdoor Championships
Silver medal – second place	1966 Kyeemagh	pairs

Thomas 'Tommy' Crossan Press is a South African international lawn bowler.

== Bowls career ==
He competed in the first World Bowls Championship in Kyeemagh, New South Wales, Australia in 1966 and won a silver medal in the pairs with Norman Snowy Walker at the event.

He won the 1950 rinks at the National Championships, bowling for the Pretoria Bowls Club.
