= John Hershaw =

Scottish lawn bowler

Personal information
- Nationality: Scottish
- Born: 1912
- Died: 17 November 1966 (aged 54) Stevenston, North Ayrshire

Sport
- Club: Ardeer Recreation BC
Medal record
Representing Scotland
World Outdoor Championships
Silver medal – second place	1966 Kyeemagh	singles
Silver medal – second place	1966 Kyeemagh	team
British Isles Championships
Gold medal – first place	1966	singles

John Hershaw (1912-1966) from Ardeer, North Ayrshire was a Scottish international lawn bowler.

== Bowls career ==
Hershaw competed in the first World Bowls Championship in Kyeemagh, New South Wales, Australia in 1966 and he won a silver medal in the singles at the championship. He also won a silver medal in the team event (Leonard Trophy).

He won the Scottish National Bowls Championships in 1965 and 1966 and subsequently won the singles at the British Isles Bowls Championships in 1966.

He collapsed at home and died on 17 November 1966, just two weeks after the 1966 World Championships and the Stevenston Town Council organised a trophy event called the Hershaw Memorial Trophy the following year.
