= John Dobbie (bowls) =

Australian lawn bowler (1914–2005)

Personal information
- Nationality: Australia
- Born: 3 August 1914
- Died: 19 October 2005 (aged 91)

Sport
- Sport: Lawn bowls
- Club: Glenferrie Hill BC and Victoria
Medal record
Representing Australia
World Outdoor Championships
Gold medal – first place	1966 Kyeemagh	triples
Silver medal – second place	1966 Kyeemagh	fours
Gold medal – first place	1966 Kyeemagh	team

John Dobbie (1914-2005) was an Australian international lawn bowler.

== Bowls career ==
Dobbie started bowling in 1934 for the Glenferrie Hill Bowls Club. He competed in the first World Bowls Championship in Kyeemagh, New South Wales, Australia in 1966 and won a gold medal in the triples with Don Collins and Athol Johnston and a silver in the fours. He also won a gold medal in the team event (Leonard Trophy).

He was club champion 11 times of which his first win in 1947 was against his father in the final.

== Family ==
His father was Frank Dobbie who won the 1927 & 1931 singles titles at the Australian National Bowls Championships when bowling for the City of Camberwell Bowls Club.

He died in 2005.
