= Harry Reston =

Scottish international lawn bowler

Personal information
- Nationality: Scottish
- Born: 16 September 1913 Mid Calder, West Lothian
- Died: 1989 (aged 75-76) Whitburn, West Lothian

Sport
- Sport: Lawn bowls
- Club: Deans BC; Bainfield BC and Linlithgow County
Medal record
Representing Scotland
World Outdoor Championships
| Bronze medal – third place | 1966 Kyeemagh | fours |
| Silver medal – second place | 1966 Kyeemagh | team |
| Silver medal – second place | 1972 Worthing | fours |
| Gold medal – first place | 1972 Worthing | team |

Henry Reston known as Harry Reston (1913–1989) was a Scottish international lawn bowler.

== Bowls career ==
He competed in the first World Bowls Championship in Kyeemagh, New South Wales, Australia in 1966 and won a bronze medal in the fours with Willie Adrain, Willie Dyet and Bert Thomson at the event. He also won a silver medal in the team event (Leonard Trophy).

He was part of the Scottish team that won the Leonard Cup in 1972 and won a silver medal in the fours.

Reston also won the 1978 Scottish National Bowls Championships singles title.
