= Nairobi Trio =

Nairobi Trio may refer to:

- The Nairobi Trio, a comedy routine popularized by Ernie Kovacs
- Nairobi Trio, a musical group led by Nigel Gavin
