= Bert Palm =

Australian lawn bowler

Personal information
- Nationality: Australia
- Born: 1915
- Died: 1982 (aged 66–67)

Sport
- Club: Bargara Bundaberg BC and Queensland
Medal record
Representing Australia
World Outdoor Championships
Gold medal – first place	1966 Kyeemagh	pairs
Silver medal – second place	1966 Kyeemagh	fours
Gold medal – first place	1966 Kyeemagh	team

Albert Palm (1915 – 1982) was an Australian international lawn bowler. When he played he was known as Bert Palm.

== Bowls career ==
Palm took part in the Lawn Bowls at the 1950 British Empire Games. He competed in the first World Bowls Championship in Kyeemagh, New South Wales, Australia in 1966 and won a gold medal in the pairs with Geoff Kelly and a silver in the fours. He also won a gold medal in the team event (Leonard Trophy).

He won the 1949 pairs title at the Australian National Bowls Championships when bowling for the Bundaberg Bowls Club.
