= Harry Atkinson (bowls) =

South African international lawn bowler

Personal information
- Nationality: South Africa

Sport
- Sport: lawn bowls
Medal record
Representing South Africa
Commonwealth Games
Gold medal – first place	1950 Auckland	fours

Harry Atkinson was a South African international lawn bowler.

== Bowls career ==
Atkinson won a gold medal at the 1950 British Empire Games in the rinks (fours) event with Herbert Currer, Alfred Blumberg and Norman Snowy Walker.
