= John Henderson (bowls) =

Canadian international lawn bowler

Personal information
- Nationality: Canada
- Born: c. 1908 Scotland
Medal record
Representing Canada
World Outdoor Championships
Silver medal – second place	1966 Kyeemagh	triples

John Henderson (c. 1908 – after 1976) was a Canadian international lawn bowler.

He competed in the first World Bowls Championship in Kyeemagh, New South Wales, Australia in 1966 as captain and won a silver medal in the triples with Karl Beacom and Sandy Houston at the event. He was vice-president of the Canadian Lawn Bowls Council and was elected President of the International Bowling Board in 1976.
