= Geoff Kelly =

Australian lawn bowler (born 1921)

Personal information
- Nationality: Australia
- Born: 10 June 1921

Sport
- Club: Coogee Sydney BC
Medal record
Representing Australia
World Outdoor Championships
Gold medal – first place	1966 Kyeemagh	pairs
Gold medal – first place	1966 Kyeemagh	team

Geoffrey Kelly (born 10 June 1921) is an Australian international lawn bowler.

== Bowls career ==
Kelly competed in the first World Bowls Championship in Kyeemagh, New South Wales, Australia in 1966 and won a gold medal in the pairs with Bert Palm at the event. He also won a gold medal in the team event (Leonard Trophy).

Kelly won the 1965 fours title at the Australian National Bowls Championships when bowling for the Coogee Bowls Club.
