= 1956 in New Zealand =

- Decades: 1930s; 1940s; 1950s; 1960s; 1970s
- See also: History of New Zealand; List of years in New Zealand; Timeline of New Zealand history

The following lists events that happened during 1956 in New Zealand.

== Population ==
- Estimated population as of 31 December: 2,209,200.
- Increase since 31 December 1955: 44,400 (2.05%).
- Males per 100 females: 101.2.

== Incumbents ==
=== Regal and viceregal ===
- Head of State – Elizabeth II
- Governor-General – Lieutenant-General The Lord Norrie GCMG GCVO CB DSO MC.

=== Government ===
The 31st New Zealand Parliament continued. In power was the National government under Sidney Holland.

- Speaker of the House – Mathew Oram
- Prime Minister – Sidney Holland.
- Deputy Prime Minister – Keith Holyoake.
- Minister of Finance – Jack Watts.
- Minister of Foreign Affairs – Tom Macdonald.
- Attorney-General – Jack Marshall.
- Chief Justice — Sir Harold Barrowclough

=== Parliamentary opposition ===
- Leader of the Opposition – Walter Nash (Labour).

=== Main centre leaders ===
- Mayor of Auckland – John Luxford, followed by Thomas Ashby
- Mayor of Hamilton – Roderick Braithwaite
- Mayor of Wellington – Robert Macalister, followed by Frank Kitts
- Mayor of Christchurch – Robert M. Macfarlane
- Mayor of Dunedin – Leonard Morton Wright

== Events ==
- 8 March: Opo the friendly Dolphin dies in the Hokianga.
- 13 March – After 26 years playing international cricket the New Zealand wins its first ever test victory against the West Indies at Eden Park.
- New Zealand troops are sent to Malaya.
- Roxburgh Dam is opened.
- Temperzone manufacturing is founded.

== Arts and literature ==
See 1956 in art, 1956 in literature

=== Music ===
See: 1956 in music

=== Radio ===
See: Public broadcasting in New Zealand

- 1 October – Radio station 4ZA launches in Invercargill on 820 kHz, supplementing station 4YZ.

=== Film ===
See: Category:1956 film awards, 1956 in film, List of New Zealand feature films, Cinema of New Zealand, Category:1956 films

== Sport ==
=== Athletics ===
- Albert Richards wins his first national title in the men's marathon, clocking 2:31:46 in Christchurch.

=== Chess ===
- The 63rd National Chess Championship was held in Dunedin, and was won by F.A. Foulds of Auckland.

=== Horse racing ===
==== Harness racing ====
- New Zealand Trotting Cup – Thunder
- Auckland Trotting Cup – Unite

=== Lawn bowls ===
The national outdoor lawn bowls championships are held in Dunedin.

- Men's singles champion – G.G. Littlejohn (Hutt Bowling Club)
- Men's pair champions – L.J. Hughes, E.H. Ravenwood (skip) (North-East Valley Bowling Club)
- Men's fours champions – P.C.F. Barrat, C.E. Tomlinson, L.J. Buckingham, Robbie Robson (skip) (Mangakino Bowling Club)

=== Olympic Games ===
==== Summer Olympics ====
Gold	Silver	Bronze	Total
2	0	0	2

==== Winter Olympics ====
- New Zealand did not participate in the 1956 Winter Olympics.

=== Soccer ===
- The Chatham Cup is won by Stop Out (Lower Hutt) who beat Shamrock (soccer) of Christchurch 4–1 in the final.
- Provincial league champions:
  - Auckland: Onehunga
  - Bay of Plenty: Rangers
  - Buller: Millerton Thistle
  - Canterbury: Western
  - Hawke's Bay: Napier Athletic
  - Manawatu: Kiwi United
  - Marlborough: Blenheim B
  - Nelson: Settlers
  - Northland: Kamo Swifts
  - Otago: Northern
  - Poverty Bay: Eastern Union
  - South Canterbury: West End
  - Southland: Brigadiers
  - Taranaki: Moturoa
  - Waikato: Huntly Thistle
  - Wairarapa: No competition
  - Wanganui: Technical College Old Boys
  - Wellington: Stop Out

== Births ==
- 3 January: Judith Tizard, politician
- 6 January: Stephen Cox, cyclist
- 16 January: Mark Burton, politician
- 4 February: Gerry Brownlee, politician
- 16 February: Vincent Ward, film director
- 1 March: Mark Todd, equestrian eventer
- 3 March: John F. Reid, cricketer
- 13 April: Peter 'Possum' Bourne, rally driver
- 17 April: Jaynie Parkhouse, freestyle swimmer
- 26 April: Tinks Pottinger, equestrian eventer
- 8 May: Richard Wilson, soccer player
- 10 May: Chris Kuggeleijn, cricket player and coach
- 23 May: Mark Shaw, rugby union footballer and selector
- 18 August: Andrew Bennie, equestrian eventer
- 29 September: Jenny Morris, singer
- 8 November: Richard Curtis, screenwriter
- 23 November: Bruce Edgar, cricketer
- 12 December: Barry Pickering, soccer player
- 16 December: Rodney Hide, politician
- Chris Finlayson, politician
- James Belich, historian
- (in Paris, France) Christopher Marshall, composer
- Douglas Wright, dancer and choreographer

== Deaths ==
- 17 April: Sir Alexander Young, politician.
- 22 May: John Christopher Rolleston, politician.
- 29 May: Charlie Seeling, rugby footballer.
- 17 June: Charles Boswell, politician.
- 19 June: Bernard Martin, politician.
- 12 September: George Gillett, rugby player.
- 21 November: Jim Thorn, labour leader and politician.

== See also ==
- List of years in New Zealand
- Timeline of New Zealand history
- History of New Zealand
- Military history of New Zealand
- Timeline of the New Zealand environment
- Timeline of New Zealand's links with Antarctica
