= Athol Johnson =

Australian lawn bowler

Athol August Johnson
Personal information
- Nationality: Australia
- Born: 1915
- Died: 1 January 1995 (aged 79–80)

Sport
- Sport: Lawn bowls
- Club: Bexley BC and N.S.W
Medal record
Representing Australia
World Outdoor Championships
Gold medal – first place	1966 Kyeemagh	triples
Silver medal – second place	1966 Kyeemagh	fours
Gold medal – first place	1966 Kyeemagh	team

Athol Johnson (1915 - 1 January 1995) was an Australian international lawn bowler.

== Bowls career ==
He competed in the first World Bowls Championship in Kyeemagh, New South Wales, Australia in 1966 and won a gold medal in the triples with Don Collins and John Dobbie and a silver medal in the fours. He also won a gold medal in the team event (Leonard Trophy).
