= Cedric Smith =

Cedric Smith may refer to:

- Cedric Smith (statistician) (1917–2002), British statistician and geneticist
- Cedric Smith (actor) (born 1943), Canadian actor and musician
- Cedric C. Smith (1895–1969), All-American football player for the University of Michigan and the Buffalo All-Americans
- Cedric Smith (American football) (born 1968), played in the NFL from 1990 to 1997
- Jim Smith (cricketer, born 1906) also known as Cedric Ivan James Smith (1906–1979), known as Jim, Middlesex cricketer of the 1930s
- Cedric Smith (bowls) (born 1925), England lawn bowler
