= Fred Russell (bowls) =

New Zealand lawn bowls player

Personal information
- Born: Frederick Thomas Russell; 20 August 1890 New Zealand
- Died: 23 December 1972 (aged 82) Wellington, New Zealand
- Occupation: Builder

Sport
- Country: New Zealand
- Sport: Lawn bowls
- Club: Hataitai Bowling Club
Medal record
Representing New Zealand
Men's lawn bowls
British Empire Games
Bronze medal – third place	1950 Auckland	Fours

Frederick Thomas Russell (20 August 1890 – 23 December 1972) was a New Zealand lawn bowls player. At the 1950 British Empire Games in Auckland, he won the men's fours bronze medal alongside teammates Arthur Engebretsen, Noel Jolly and Pete Skoglund. The New Zealand, Australian and South African fours each finished the round robin with two wins, but New Zealand then lost an eliminator match against the South Africans and did not progress to the final.

Russell was born on 20 August 1890, the son of Alexander and Emily Russell, and died on 23 December 1972. He was buried at Karori Cemetery. A builder by trade, he was a member of the Hataitai Bowling Club in Wellington.
