= Gordon Jolly =

New Zealand lawn bowls competitor (1913–1986)

Gordon Jolly OBE
Personal information
- Born: Gordon Hezlam Jolly; 25 May 1913 Cromwell, New Zealand
- Died: 26 October 1986 (aged 73) Dunedin, New Zealand
- Relative: Noel Jolly (brother)

Sport
- Sport: Lawn bowls
- Club: Leith Bowling Club
Medal record
Representing New Zealand
World Bowls Championship
Gold medal – first place	1966 Sydney	Men's fours
British Commonwealth Games
Gold medal – first place	1974 Christchurch	Fours
National Championships
Gold medal – first place	1970	Fours

Gordon Hezlam Jolly OBE (25 May 1913 – 26 October 1986) was a lawn bowls competitor for New Zealand.

== Early life and family ==
Born in Cromwell on 25 May 1913, Jolly was the son of Ernest Jolly, who served as mayor of Cromwell, and Gabrielle Hezlam Jolly (née Dunne). His brothers included Noel Jolly, who was also a noted lawn bowler, and Ian Jolly, who played representative rugby union for Otago.

On 7 September 1940, Jolly married Molly Margaret Hungerford at Sacred Heart Church, North East Valley, Dunedin.

== Lawn bowls ==
Jolly began playing bowls in Oamaru at the Meadowbank Bowling Club. Joining the Leith Bowling Club in Dunedin in 1946, he went on to win 18 Dunedin centre bowls titles.

At the 1966 World Outdoor Bowls Championship in Sydney, Jolly represented New Zealand in the men's triples and men's fours, winning the latter title along with Norm Lash, Ron Buchan and Bill O'Neill. Jolly won the 1970 fours title at the New Zealand National Bowls Championships, alongside J. W. Walls, A. J. Robinson and Peter Jolly, representing the Leith Bowling Club. The same year, at the 1970 British Commonwealth Games, he was part of the New Zealand men's four that placed 11th. At the 1974 British Commonwealth Games, he won the men's fours gold medal, partnering David Baldwin, Kerry Clark and John Somerville.

A life member of Bowls New Zealand, Jolly served as a national selector and secretary–treasurer, and was president in 1968.

== Honours ==
In the 1977 New Year Honours, Jolly was appointed an Officer of the Order of the British Empire, for services to bowls. He was an inaugural inductee into the Bowls New Zealand Hall of Fame in 2013.

== Death ==
Jolly died at Dunedin on 26 October 1986, and he was buried at Andersons Bay Cemetery. His wife, Molly, died the following year.
