= Cedric Smith (bowls) =

British lawn bowler

Personal information
- Nationality: British (English)
- Born: 1925

Sport
- Club: Barnet BC and Hertfordshire
Medal record
Representing England
World Outdoor Championships
Bronze medal – third place	1966 Kyeemagh	pairs
Bronze medal – third place	1966 Kyeemagh	team

Cedric Smith (born 1925) is an English international lawn bowler.

== Bowls career ==
Smith was from Hertfordshire. He made his international debut in 1956 and competed in the first World Bowls Championship in Kyeemagh, New South Wales, Australia in 1966 and won a bronze medal in the pairs with the legendary David Bryant at the event. He also won a bronze medal in the team event (Leonard Trophy).

In 1970, Smith emigrated to Sydney, Australia, where he became a bowls commentator for ABC TV.
