= Bill O'Neill (bowls) =

New Zealand international lawn bowler

Personal information
- Nationality: New Zealand
- Born: 1909
- Died: unknown

Sport
- Club: Carlton BC
Medal record
Representing New Zealand
World Outdoor Championships
Gold medal – first place	1966 Kyeemagh	fours

William P. O'Neill (1909 – date of death unknown) was a New Zealand international lawn bowler.

== Bowls career ==
He competed in the first World Bowls Championship in Kyeemagh, New South Wales, Australia in 1966 and won a gold medal in the fours with Norm Lash, Ron Buchan and Gordon Jolly at the event.

He won the 1954, 1960 and 1963 fours title at the New Zealand National Bowls Championships when bowling for the Carlton Bowls Club.

== Awards ==
He was inducted into the New Zealand Sports Hall of Fame.
