= Arthur Engebretsen =

New Zealand lawn bowls player

Personal information
- Born: John Arthur Engebretsen; 1 March 1892 New Zealand
- Died: 16 October 1956 (aged 64) New Zealand
- Occupation: Schoolteacher
- Spouse: Katherine Jack Nicol (m. 1914; died 1951)

Sport
- Country: New Zealand
- Sport: Lawn bowls
- Club: Napier Bowling Club; Heretaunga Bowling Club

Achievements and titles
- National finals: Singles champion (1935); Fours champion (1945)
Medal record
Men's lawn bowls
Representing New Zealand
Commonwealth Games
Bronze medal – third place	1950 Auckland	Fours

John Arthur Engebretsen (1 March 1892 – 16 October 1956) was a New Zealand lawn bowls player, who won a bronze medal for his country at the 1950 British Empire Games.

== Early life and family ==
Born on 1 March 1892, Engebretsen was the son of Annie Paulina Engebretsen (née Pedersen) and Otto Engebretsen. He was educated at Dannevirke High School.

On 20 May 1914, Engebretsen married Katherine Jack Nicol.

== Teaching career ==
Engebretsen became a schoolteacher, and in February 1941 he took up the post of headmaster at Mahora School in Hastings. He served in that role until retiring in May 1951.

== Lawn bowls ==
Engebretsen won two national lawn bowls championship titles: the men's singles representing the Napier Bowling Club in 1935; and as skip of the Heretaunga Bowling Club combination that won the men's fours in 1945.

At the 1950 British Empire Games in Auckland, he was a member of the New Zealand men's four—alongside teammates Fred Russell, Noel Jolly and Pete Skoglund—that won the bronze medal.

== Later life and death ==
Engebretsen died on 16 October 1956, and was buried at Hastings Cemetery. He had been predeceased by his wife, Kate, in 1951.
