= Leslie Brown (bowls) =

Personal information
- Nationality: Fiji

Sport
- Sport: Lawn bowls
Medal record
Representing Fiji
Commonwealth Games
Bronze medal – third place	1950 Auckland	pairs

Leslie G Brown was a Fijian lawn bowls international who competed in the 1950 British Empire Games.

== Bowls career ==
At the 1950 British Empire Games he won the bronze medal in the pairs event with James Poulton.
