= Lionel Garnett (bowls) =

Personal information
- Nationality: (Fiji)
- Born: 6 April 1895 Suva, Fiji
- Died: 24 September 1983 (aged 88) Gosford, New South Wales

Sport
- Sport: Lawn bowls
Medal record
Representing (Fiji)
Commonwealth Games
Bronze medal – third place	1950 Auckland	singles

Lionel Francis Garnett (1895-1983), was a Fijian lawn bowls international who competed in the 1950 British Empire Games.

== Bowls career ==
At the 1950 British Empire Games he won the bronze medal in the singles event.
