= Len Knight =

Australian lawn bowler

Personal information
- Nationality: Australia

Sport
- Sport: Lawn bowls
- Club: Parkes BC
Medal record
Men's Lawn bowls
Representing Australia
Commonwealth Games
Silver medal – second place	1950 Auckland	fours

Leonard Thomas Knight was an Australian lawn bowls international who competed in the 1950 British Empire Games.

== Bowls career ==
At the 1950 British Empire Games he won the silver medal in the fours event with James Cobley, John Cobley and Charles Cordaiy.

He was the 1949 Australian National Bowls Championships rinks (fours) winner, bowling with the same trio and for the Parkes Bowls Club in New South Wales.
