= Noel Jolly =

New Zealand lawn bowls player

Personal information
- Born: Noel Ernest Jolly; 23 December 1908 Cromwell, New Zealand
- Died: 23 April 1969 (aged 60) Auckland, New Zealand
- Occupation: Bank manager
- Relative: Gordon Jolly (brother)

Sport
- Country: New Zealand
- Sport: Lawn bowls
- Club: St Clair Bowling Club
Medal record
Men's lawn bowls
Representing New Zealand
British Empire Games
Bronze medal – third place	1950 Auckland	Fours

Noel Ernest Jolly (23 December 1908 – 23 April 1969) was a New Zealand lawn bowls player. At the 1950 British Empire Games in Auckland, he won the men's fours bronze medal alongside teammates Arthur Engebretsen, Fred Russell and Pete Skoglund. The New Zealand, Australian and South African fours each finished the round robin with two wins, but New Zealand then lost an eliminator match against the South Africans and did not progress to the final.

Jolly was born in Cromwell on 23 December 1908, the son of Ernest Jolly, who served as mayor of Cromwell, and Gabrielle Hezlam Jolly (née Dunne). His brothers included Gordon Jolly, who was also a noted lawn bowler, and Ian Jolly, who played representative rugby union for Otago.

As a young man in Central Otago, he was a prominent tennis player, but turned to lawn bowls as a result of injury. During World War II, he served in the Middle East, and after his return he joined the St Clair Bowling Club in Dunedin, where he won the club championship in consecutive years from 1946 to 1949. A bank manager, Jolly died on 23 April 1969, and was buried at Waikumete Cemetery in Auckland.
