= Ron Buchan =

New Zealand international lawn bowler

Ron Buchan MBE
Personal information
- Full name: Maurice Ronald Buchan
- Born: 6 December 1907
- Died: 30 January 2003 (aged 95) Hamilton, New Zealand

Sport
- Country: New Zealand
- Sport: Lawn bowls
- Club: Tui Park Bowling Club
Medal record
Representing New Zealand
Men's lawn bowls
World Outdoor Championships
Gold medal – first place	1966 Kyeemagh	fours

Maurice Ronald Buchan MBE (6 December 1907 – 30 January 2003) was a New Zealand international lawn bowler.

== Bowls career ==
He competed in the first World Bowls Championship in Kyeemagh, New South Wales, Australia in 1966 and won a gold medal in the fours with Norm Lash, Gordon Jolly and Bill O'Neill at the event.

He won the 1964 and 1965 singles title and the 1957 fours title at the New Zealand National Bowls Championships when bowling for the Tui Park Bowls Club.

== Honours and awards ==
In the 1986 Queen's Birthday Honours, Buchan was appointed a Member of the Order of the British Empire, for services to bowling. In 2013, he was an inaugural inductee into the New Zealand Bowls Hall of Fame.

== Death ==
Buchan died in Hamilton in 2003.
