= James Poulton =

Personal information
- Nationality: Fiji
- Born: 19 January 1905 Johannesburg, Transvaal Colony
- Died: Brisbane, Australia

Sport
- Sport: Lawn bowls
Medal record
Representing Fiji
Commonwealth Games
Bronze medal – third place	1950 Auckland	pairs

James Edward Poulton (1905-date of death unknown), was a Transavval Colony born, Fijian lawn bowls international who competed in the 1950 British Empire Games.

== Bowls career ==
At the 1950 British Empire Games he won the bronze medal in the pairs event with Leslie Brown.

== Personal life ==
His family moved to Suva in Fiji when James was a child. In 1931, he married Gladys Palmer in the same place.
