= Albert Newton (bowls) =

Australian lawn bowls international (fl. 1950)

Albert Edward Newton
Personal information
- Nationality: Australia
- Born: November 6, 1909
- Died: 1989 (aged 79–80)

Sport
- Sport: Lawn bowls
- Club: City BC, NSW
Medal record
Representing Australia
Commonwealth Games
Silver medal – second place	1950 Auckland	singles

Albert Edward Newton (c.1910 – 1989) was an Australian lawn bowls international who competed in the 1950 British Empire Games.

== Bowls career ==
At the 1950 British Empire Games he won the silver medal in the singles event.

He was the 1952 Australian National Bowls Championships singles winner, bowling for the City Bowls Club in New South Wales.

Newton's brother, Bill, was also a bowler. The siblings competed against each other in the 1957 Australian bowls singles championship, with Albert beating his brother 31-20.

Newton died in 1989.
