= Charles Cordaiy =

Australian lawn bowler

Personal information
- Nationality: Australia
- Born: 25 May 1892 Gympie, Queensland
- Died: 9 November 1983 (aged 91) Sydney

Sport
- Sport: Lawn bowls
- Club: Parkes BC
Medal record
Men's Lawn bowls
Representing Australia
Commonwealth Games
Silver medal – second place	1950 Auckland	fours

Charles Melbourne Cordaiy (1892–1983), was an Australian lawn bowls international who competed in the 1950 British Empire Games.

== Bowls career ==
At the 1950 British Empire Games he won the silver medal in the fours event with James Cobley, John Cobley and Len Knight.

He was the 1949 Australian National Bowls Championships rinks (fours) winner, bowling with the same trio and for the Parkes Bowls Club in New South Wales.
