= Robert Henry (bowls) =

New Zealand lawn bowls player

Personal information
- Born: 1889 or 1890
- Died: 21 September 1954 (aged 64) Christchurch, New Zealand
- Occupation: Police officer

Sport
- Country: New Zealand
- Sport: Lawn bowls
- Club: Sydenham Bowling Club
Medal record
Men's lawn bowls
Representing New Zealand
British Empire Games
Gold medal – first place	1950 Auckland	Pairs

Robert Henry (1889 or 1890 – 21 September 1954) was a New Zealand lawn bowls player. At the 1950 British Empire Games in Auckland he won the gold medal in the men's pair alongside Phil Exelby. The pair, with Henry playing lead, won all three of their round-robin matches to take the title.

Henry arrived in New Zealand in about 1910. He was a police sergeant in Christchurch, and a member of the Sydenham Bowling Club in that city. He died in Christchurch on 21 September 1954, and was buried at the Ruru Lawn Cemetery.
