= Tom Brown (bowls) =

British lawn bowler

Personal information
- Nationality: British (English)
- Born: 1915
- Died: 1980 (aged 64–65)

Sport
- Sport: Lawn bowls
- Club: Woking Park BC
Medal record
Representing England
World Outdoor Championships
Bronze medal – third place	1966 Kyeemagh	team

Tom Brown (1915-1980), was an England international lawn bowls competitor.

== Bowls career ==
He represented England at the 1966 World Outdoor Bowls Championship where he won a bronze medal in the team event (Leonard Trophy). He was a member of the triples and fours.

Brown joined Woking Park BC in 1947 and was ten times club champion and three time county champion. In addition he was an indoor international.

== Personal life ==
He was a postman by trade. He has a tournament named after him by his club.
