= Cedric Tillman =

Cedric Tillman may refer to:

- Cedric Tillman (arena football) (born April 1970), American football player in the Arena Football League
- Cedric Tillman (American football, born July 1970), former American football player in the NFL
- Cedric Tillman (American football, born 2000), American football player with the NFL Cleveland Browns
