= Cédric Van der Elst =

Belgian footballer

Personal information
- Date of birth: 19 June 1980 (age 46)
- Place of birth: Genk, Belgium
- Height: 1.80 m (5 ft 11 in)
- Position: Midfielder

Youth career
- 1986–1988: Winterslag
- 1988–1999: Genk

Senior career*
| Years | Team | Apps | (Gls) |
| 1999–2003 | Genk | 7 | (0) |
| 2001–2002 | → MVV Maastricht (loan) | 16 | (3) |
| 2002–2003 | → Heusden-Zolder (loan) | 17 | (0) |
| 2003–2004 | Heusden-Zolder | 5 | (0) |
| 2004–2005 | OH Leuven | 28 | (4) |
| 2005–2008 | Tongeren | 95 | (10) |
| 2008–2015 | Eendracht Termien | | |
- * Club domestic league appearances and goals

Cédric Van der Elst (born 19 June 1980 in Genk, Belgium) is a Belgian retired footballer.

== Career ==
During his career, Van der Elst never went far from his birthplace Genk, always playing for a team in or close to the Limburg region. Van der Elst first grew through the youth ranks of Winterslag and Genk, to eventually feature in the first team during the 1999–2000 season in the Belgian First Division. Still a youngster, Genk loaned him out to Dutch side MVV Maastricht and newly promoted team Beringen-Heusden-Zolder during the 2001–02 and 2002–03 seasons respectively, before allowing him to leave to Beringen-Heusden-Zolder permanently. Thereafter he moved to Belgian Second Division team OH Leuven, followed by a three-season spell at Tongeren in the Belgian Third Division. Thereafter he moved to Genk-based team Eendracht Termien in the Belgian Provincial leagues.
