= John Cobley =

Australian lawn bowler

Personal information
- Nationality: Australia
- Born: 7 September 1872 Camberwell, Victoria
- Died: 23 March 1958 (aged 65) Parkes, New South Wales

Sport
- Sport: Lawn bowls
- Club: Parkes BC
Medal record
Men's Lawn bowls
Representing Australia
Commonwealth Games
| Silver medal – second place | 1950 Auckland | fours |

John Cobley (1872–1958), was an Australian lawn bowls international who competed in the 1950 British Empire Games.

== Bowls career ==
At the 1950 British Empire Games he won the silver medal in the fours event with his brother James Cobley, Len Knight and Charles Cordaiy.

He was the 1949 Australian National Bowls Championships rinks (fours) winner, bowling with the same trio and for the Parkes Bowls Club in New South Wales.
