= Anton Bernhardt Julius Lemmer =

Anton Bernhardt Julius Lemmer (c. 1871 – 17 September 1957) was a New Zealand music school director and conductor. He was born in Altona, Hamburg, Germany about 1871.
