= Nigel Gavin =

- Born: New York, US
- Instruments: Composer, guitar, mandolin, glissentar, bass guitar
- Years active: 1974–present
- Label: Ode Records
- Website: www.nigelgavin.com

Nigel Gavin is a New Zealand-based musician and composer, best known as a guitar player.

== Discography ==
Date	Title	Label	Catalog Number	Artist/Group
Solo
1998	Music For Flem		thrum001	
2003	Thrum	Ode Records	thrum002	
2007	Visitation	Ode Records	thrum003	
2017	Waggle Dance	Thrum Records		
Other
	Songs from down the Line	indie		Richard Watt
	Kura Huna	Mai music		Whirimako Black
1993	Living in Exile	Wayward/Sony Music NZ		Wayne Gillespie
2006	Live at the Bunker with Wayne Gillespie	Wayward Music	WM006	Wayne Gillespie and Nigel Gavin
	The Nairobi Trio Live	Manu	Manu 1338	the Nairobi Trio
	Through the Clouds	manu	manu 1432	nairobi trio
	Shelf Life	Zulu zcd001		Nairobi Trio
	Live at the McDonald Winery	Zulu zcd002		Nairobi trio
	The Jew Brothers live at Gerhards	rouge records		the Jews Brothers
	My Yiddish Swing	rouge records		The Jews Brothers
	the Braeburn album	rouge records		the Jews Brothers
	Too much Talent	rouge records		the Jews Brothers
	Mr. Darwin's Dances	atoll	acd 200	Besser & Bravura
	You Got Your Wish	atoll	acd 302	Bravura
	Music for Peace vol. one	unsung	unsung 109	Bravura and Friends
	Turn	rattle	rat do13	Bravura
	New Orleans Gumbo Jazz-Live	bbs	bbs 102	The Blue Bottom Stompers
	"But is it Folk?"	bbs	bbs 103	The Blue Bottom Stompers
	Live on Waiheke Island Jazz festival	bbs	bbs 104	The Blue Bottom Stompers
	Pesky Digits	rattle	rattle doo1	Gitbox Rebellion
	Touch Wood	rattle / DGM	rat doo5/ DGM 9511	Gitbox Rebellion
	Different Tracks	rattle	rat DOO3	Misc.
	Parting Shots	Ode	CDODE 1290	Last Man Down
	King of the Mercuries	ODE	CD Manu 1526	Ross Mullins and the Snaps
	Tidemarks	Red Shaver	RS 101	Ross Mullins
1991	Show of Hands	EG	EEG 2102-2	Robert Fripp & the League of Crafty Guitarists
	Intergalactic Boogie Express	DGM	DGM 9502	Robert Fripp & the League of Crafty Guitarists
2005	Clean Break	global routes		Lorina Harding
2007	East of the Sun	global roots music	CM001	Carolina Moon
	precious legacy			johnathan besser and co
	Welcome to the Big Room	jazzscore	CD001	Trip to the Moon
2008	Ecstacy	attar	attar1003	Bravura
	Kokomo, In The Well	jayrem	BRPCD009	Kokomo
2009	Famous Blue Raincoat EP	wayward music	na	famous blue raincoat/Wayne Gillespie Rob Grosser
2009	Recent Works	Ode	manu 3004	Nigel Gavin and Richard Adams (violinist)
	A Job with the Circus	Ode records	dvdmanu 8005	Nigel Gavin
2010	Decadence Live	Atoll	ACD 409	Besser & Bravura
