= Temperzone =

Temperzone Limited
- Company type: Private
- Industry: Manufacturing
- Founded: 1956
- Founder: Eric Kendall
- Headquarters: Auckland, New Zealand
- Area served: Australia, New Zealand, Singapore, China, Hong Kong, India, Indonesia, Sri Lanka, Vietnam
- Key people: Les Kendall (CEO)
- Products: Air conditioning
- Number of employees: 600+
- Website: www.temperzone.com

Temperzone is a privately owned large-sized organisation specialising in manufacturing air conditioning units and ventilation equipment for both residential and commercial markets. It operates in New Zealand, Australia, Singapore and other parts of Asia. Temperzone has over 500 employees.

== History ==
The Temperzone Group was originally formed in New Zealand in 1956 by founder Eric Kendall. Temperzone's presence in Australia was due to the acquisition of Bradway Engineering in 1985. Today, the business is run by Governing Director and CEO Les Kendall.

== General ==
It is one of the few manufacturers in Australia & New Zealand that still manufactures within those countries. It is also one of the only companies in the manufacturing industry that has its management structure within Australasia.

Temperzone was the first manufacturer to use R-410A refrigerant (with a Zero ODP) as a standard across its entire split-ducted, rooftop package & water source heat pump range.

Temperzone is the largest air conditioning manufacturer in Australia and New Zealand.

== Hitachi Strategic Alliance ==
On 3 August 2009, Temperzone Australia and Hitachi announced a strategic alliance which allowed Hitachi air conditioning products to be exclusively distributed within the Australian and New Zealand markets by Temperzone.

== 2020 Layoffs ==
Temperzone laid off 85 of its employees after COVID-19 pandemic in New Zealand.

== See also ==
- Air conditioning
- HVAC
- Refrigerant
