= Phil Exelby =

New Zealand lawn bowls player (1905–1981)

Personal information
- Born: Evan Philip Exelby; 12 October 1905 New Zealand
- Died: 6 June 1981 (aged 75) New Zealand
- Occupation: Bacon curer
- Spouse: Amy Mawhinney (m. 1932)

Sport
- Country: New Zealand
- Sport: Lawn bowls

Achievements and titles
- National finals: Men's pairs champion (1947)
Medal record
Men's lawn bowls
Representing New Zealand
Commonwealth Games
Gold medal – first place	1950 Auckland	Pairs

Evan Philip Exelby (12 October 1905 – 6 June 1981) was a New Zealand lawn bowls player.

== Bowls career ==
At the 1950 British Empire Games in Auckland he won the men's pairs gold medal with Robert Henry.

In 1947, Exelby won the New Zealand National Bowls Championships pairs title with William Ransford "Rance" Hawkins, representing the Frankton club. Exelby died on 6 June 1981, and was buried at Hamilton Park Cemetery.
