= Ezra Wyeth =

Australian cricketer

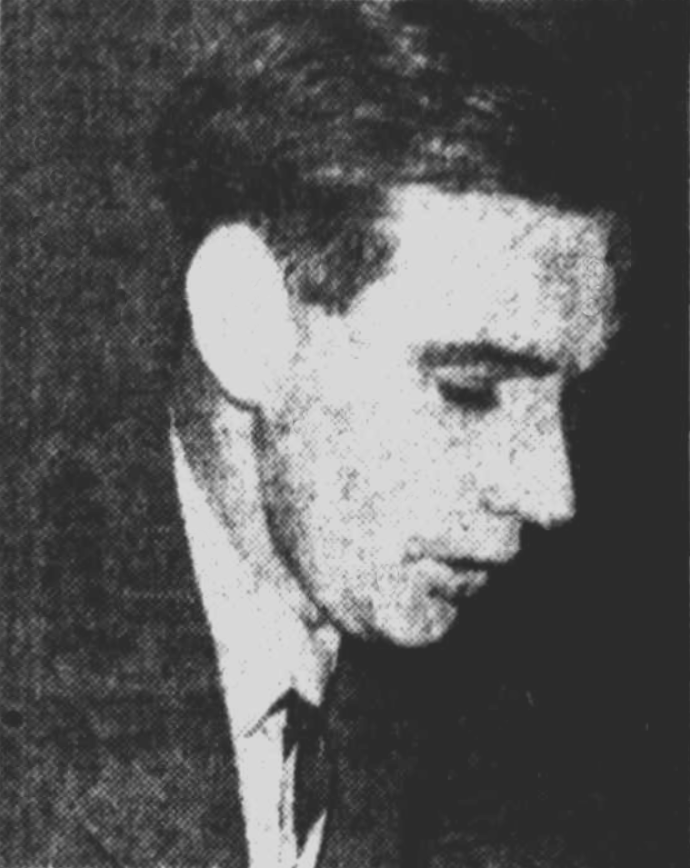

Personal information
- Born: 13 March 1910; Toowoomba, Queensland, Australia
- Died: 15 October 1992 (aged 82); Northridge, California, United States
- Nickname: Boxer
- Source: Cricinfo, 8 October 2020

Ezra Wyeth (13 March 1910 – 15 October 1992) was an Australian cricketer. He played in twenty-five first-class matches for Queensland between 1933 and 1938.

== Cricket career ==
Wyeth began his senior cricket career playing for University in Brisbane Grade Cricket in 1929 and he remained with the club for his whole career. He bowled left-hand spin and was described as unorthodox as he approached from around the wicket in his runup but bowled over the wicket and bowled with a slight limp after being hit in the foot by a drive in the early 1930s. In his career he worked at the Teachers' Training College in Brisbane.

== Post-cricket life ==
Wyeth emigrated to the United States after World War II, took up American citizenship in 1961, and was on the faculty of the San Fernando Valley State College, Northridge between 1958 and 1980.

A keen lawn bowler, Wyeth became a major part of the sport in the United States, winning multiple tournaments, becoming the American Lawn Bowling Association head coach, writing in BOWLS magazine and teaching the sport to people of all ages.

== See also ==
- List of Queensland first-class cricketers
