= Richard Adams (violinist) =

New Zealand jazz violinist and abstract artist (b.1957)

Richard Adams (born 1957) is a New Zealand jazz violinist and abstract artist.

Born in London and migrated to New Zealand, Adams was taught violin by his mother. By the time he left school at 16 he was playing in the Wellington Symphonia. He auditioned for the National Orchestra trainee section, but failed because of his poor sight-reading, having learned to play by ear.

== The Nairobi Trio ==
In 1989 Adams and John Quigley formed the Nairobi Trio. The trio consists of Adams (violin/vocals), Quigley (guitar/vocals), and Aaron Coddel (bass/vocals). They play improvised jazz and re-worked standard jazz pieces. They are best known for their original compositions. On tour they perform as a quartet with Andrew Dixon on saxophones/flute/vocals. The trio's name was chosen as a bit of a joke because none of the members came from Nairobi.

Adams previously received critical acclaim with the jazz group Neon Quaver. He played with his own Richard Adams Quartet and flautist Paul Horn at the Wellington International Arts Festival.

== Film and book ==
In 1977 Adams co-scripted, co-produced, and co-directed the New Zealand feature film Artman which was released at Wellington Film Festival in July 1979. In 1979 he published Translations, a book of poems and etchings.

From 1982 to 1988 Adams was head scenic artist for the New Zealand Film Industry. In 1988 he co-founded Pro Art, specialising in commissioned artworks and sculptural pieces.

Adams' first studio in 1979 was the dome that was built in the garden at Rita Angus' cottage in Wellington before it became a residence for painters. Adams worked in the kitchen. When he moved to Auckland he rented the Gillies Ave studio that belonged to painter Louise Henderson. Later he worked in writer Barry Crump's former studio in Devonport.

Adams first exhibited his works in 1982 at the Molesworth Gallery in Wellington. Since then his work has been exhibited in Tokyo, Sydney, New York, London and more recently at Gallery Thirty Three in Wanaka, The Arthouse in Christchurch, and the McPherson Gallery in Auckland.

In 2004 Adams was appointed Resident Artist, Chambre Avec Vue, Saignon, France.
