= Artman =

Artman is a surname. Notable people with the surname include:

- Carl J. Artman, American politician
- Corrie Artman (1907–1970), American football player
- Wayne Artman (1936–2006), American sound engineer

== See also ==
- Artiman, village in Hamadan Province, Iran
