= Norman Snowy Walker =

South African international lawn bowler

Norman 'Snowy' Walker
Personal information
- Nationality: South Africa Scotland
- Born: July 22, 1901 Dundee, Scotland
- Died: September 3, 1977 (aged 76)

Sport
- Club: Pretoria West BC and Northern Transvaal
Medal record
Representing South Africa
World Outdoor Championships
Silver medal – second place	1966 Kyeemagh	pairs
Commonwealth Games
Silver medal – second place	1938 Sydney	rinks/fours
Gold medal – first place	1950 Auckland	fours
Silver medal – second place	1958 Cardiff	fours

Norman Stewart 'Snowy' Walker (1901 – 1977) was a South African international lawn bowler.

== Bowls career ==
Walker who was born is Dundee in Scotland won three medals at the Commonwealth Games. In 1938 he won a rinks (fours) silver followed by the gold medal in the fours at the 1950 British Empire Games and in 1958 he won another silver medal in the fours at the 1958 British Empire and Commonwealth Games.

He competed in the first World Bowls Championship in Kyeemagh, New South Wales, Australia in 1966 and won a silver medal in the pairs with Tommy Press at the event.

He won the 1954 singles and two rinks titles at the National Championships bowling for the Pretoria West Bowls Club.
