= Pete Skoglund =

New Zealand lawn bowls player

Personal information
- Born: Thomas Theodorus Skoglund; 25 July 1905 Stratford, New Zealand
- Died: 2 October 1968 (aged 63) Auckland, New Zealand
- Spouse: Phoebe White (m. 1928)
- Relative(s): Philip Skoglund (brother); Phil Skoglund (nephew)
Medal record
Men's lawn bowls
Representing New Zealand
Commonwealth Games
Bronze medal – third place	1950 Auckland	Fours

Thomas Theodorus "Pete" Skoglund (25 July 1905 – 2 October 1968) was a New Zealand lawn bowls player.

At the 1950 British Empire Games in Auckland he won the men's fours bronze medal alongside teammates Arthur Engebretsen, Noel Jolly and Fred Russell. Skolgund also competed in the same event at the 1954 British Empire and Commonwealth Games in Vancouver, finishing in sixth place.

He was the brother of politician and cabinet minister Philip Skoglund, whose son Phil Skoglund was also a champion lawn bowls player.

Skoglund died in Auckland in 1968 and his ashes were buried at Purewa Cemetery.

== Books ==
- Skoglund, Pete (1966) 'Mr Bowls' - The Pete Skoglund Story, A H & A W Reed, Wellington, New Zealand
