= Ray Puckett =

New Zealand distance runner

Personal information
- Full name: Raymond Leslie Puckett
- Born: 17 December 1935 (age 90) Gillingham, Dorset, England
- Height: 1.65 m (5 ft 5 in)
- Weight: 54 kg (119 lb)

Sport
- Country: New Zealand
- Sport: Athletics
- Coached by: Arthur Lydiard

Achievements and titles
- National finals: Marathon champion (1958, 1959, 1960, 1964, 1965)
- Personal best: Marathon – 2:17:38

Raymond Leslie Puckett (born 17 December 1935) is a former New Zealand distance runner, who represented his country at the Olympic Games in 1960 and 1964, and at the 1958 British Empire and Commonwealth Games. Coached by Arthur Lydiard, Puckett was the first New Zealander to complete a marathon in under two hours and 30 minutes.

== Early life and family ==
Puckett was born on 17 December 1935 in Gillingham, Dorset, England, the son of Marjorie Sybil Puckett (née Cox), a New Zealander, and her husband, Maurice Leslie Puckett, a lieutenant in the Royal Navy. He was brought back to New Zealand when he was one year old, travelling on the Rangitane.

== Athletics ==
Puckett was 18 years old when he began being coached by Arthur Lydiard, who saw potential in Puckett as a marathon runner. Puckett went on to win five national marathon titles, in 1958, 1959, 1960, 1964 and 1965. He was the first New Zealander to complete a marathon in under two hours 30 minutes, and his personal best time for the distance of 2:17:38 was recorded in winning the 1964 national championship.

At the 1958 British Empire and Commonwealth Games in Cardiff, Puckett competed in the men's six-mile race, finishing 12th, and in the marathon, placing 14th. Competing in the marathon at the 1960 Rome Olympics, Puckett finished in 51st place in a time of 2:37:36. Four years later in the same event at the 1964 Olympics in Tokyo, he ran 2:27:34 to finish 27th.

== Later life ==
Following an accident in about 1997, Puckett was forced to give up running. However, he was selected as a torchbearer for the 2000 Summer Olympics torch relay.

Puckett became an accomplished croquet player, winning the doubles title at the North Island championships in 1998, and is one of the three leading makers of croquet mallets in New Zealand.
