= Kyeemagh =

- Suburb
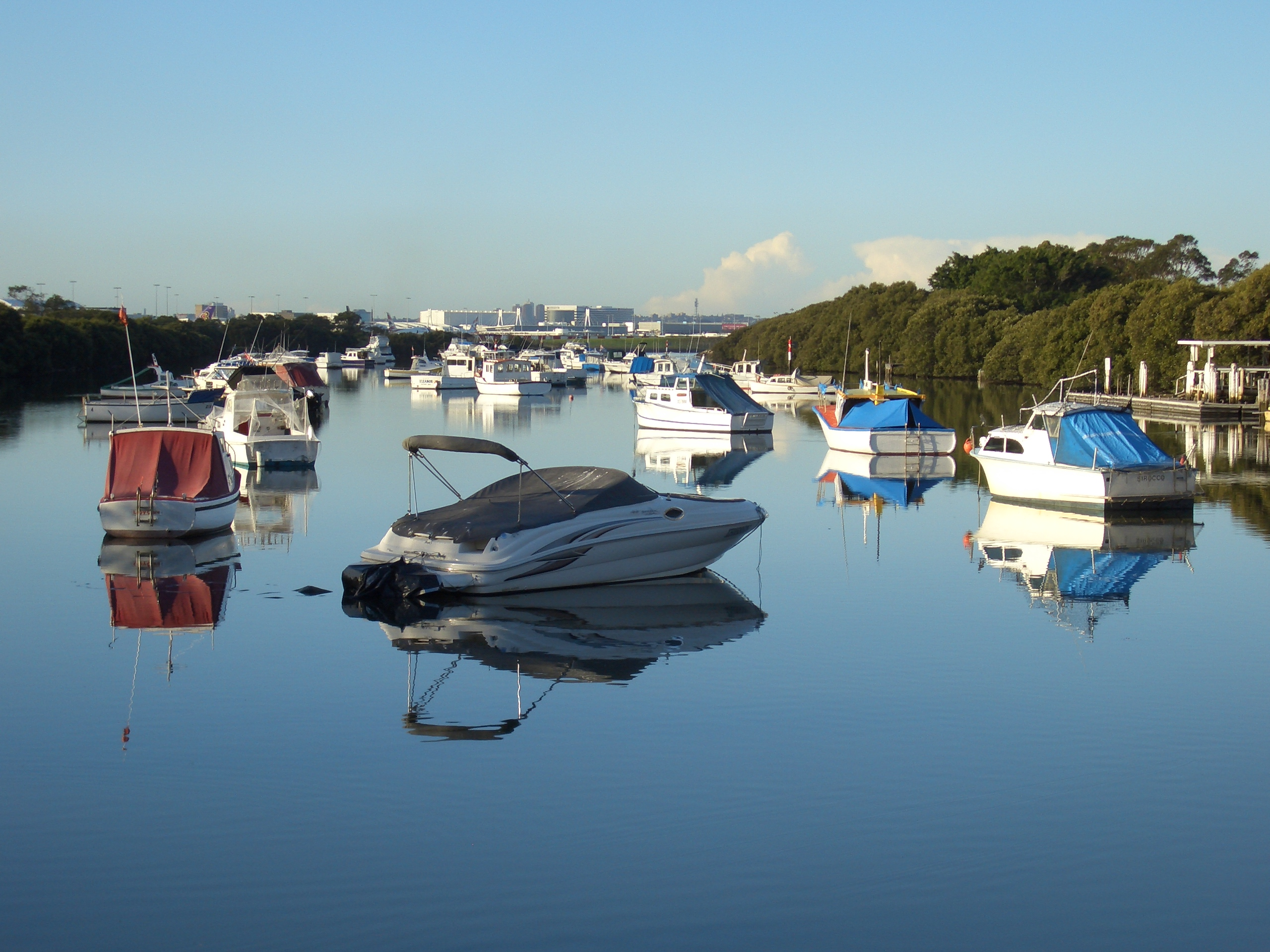
- Muddy Creek

- Interactive map of Kyeemagh
- Country: Australia
- State: New South Wales
- City: Sydney
- LGA: Bayside Council
- Location: 12 km (7.5 mi) south of Sydney CBD

Government
  - State electorate: Rockdale
  - Federal division: Kingsford Smith
- Elevation: 7 m (23 ft)

Population
  - Total: 935 (2021 census)
- Postcode: 2216
Suburbs around Kyeemagh
Arncliffe	Sydney Airport
Banksia	Kyeemagh	Botany Bay
Rockdale	Brighton Le Sands

Kyeemagh (/kaɪˈiːmə/ ky-EE-mə) is a suburb in southern Sydney, in the state of New South Wales, Australia. It is 12 kilometres south of the Sydney central business district, on the western shore of Botany Bay. Kyeemagh is in the local government area of the Bayside Council and is part of the St George area.

== History ==
Kyeemagh is an Aboriginal name meaning 'beautiful dawn'. Prior to European settlement it was part of the lands of the Cadigal people.

The name of the suburb was adopted from the name of the Polo Ground established in the area in 1929 (Sydney Morning Herald 4 July 1929 p15). To provide better access to the ground from the north a new bridge was constructed over the Cook's River (Sydney Morning Herald 28 June 1930 p20). The new polo ground was also used for playing cricket.

The area between the Cooks River and Georges River was originally known as Seven Mile Beach. It was changed to Lady Robinson's Beach in 1874 to honour Governor Sir Hercules Robinson's wife. Cook Park is named after Samuel Cook who advocated it as a public pleasure area.

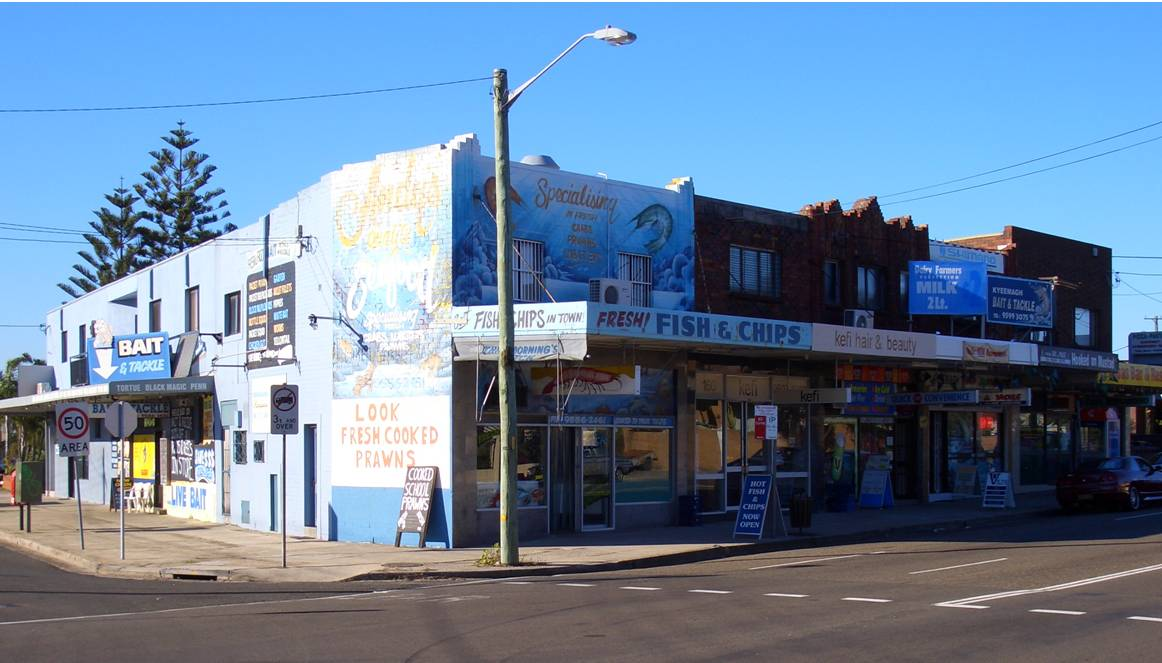
Shops on Bestic Street

== Geography ==
Kyeemagh is a quiet, residential district located in a triangle of land with Lady Robinsons Beach to the east, Cooks River and Muddy Creek forming a northwest boundary and Bestic Street bordering the south. Maps in Commonwealth Electoral Rolls show no development in the area in 1909 (Lang/Rockdale) or 1915(Illawarra/Rockdale). Maps in the 1925 and 1928 Rolls (Barton/Rockdale) show a very dense, cramped settlement, Filby Estate, between Goode Street and the bay. Adair Street and Annie Street lie east from Goode Street. Other streets include Coy, Derby, Henry and William Streets. There appear to be numerous other lanes and walking tracks in the settlement. None have persisted. This settlement was replaced by a larger, more sparsely populated suburb named Kyeemagh. The area was served by a bus route between the shopping centres of Rockdale and Brighton Le Sands.

== Landmarks ==
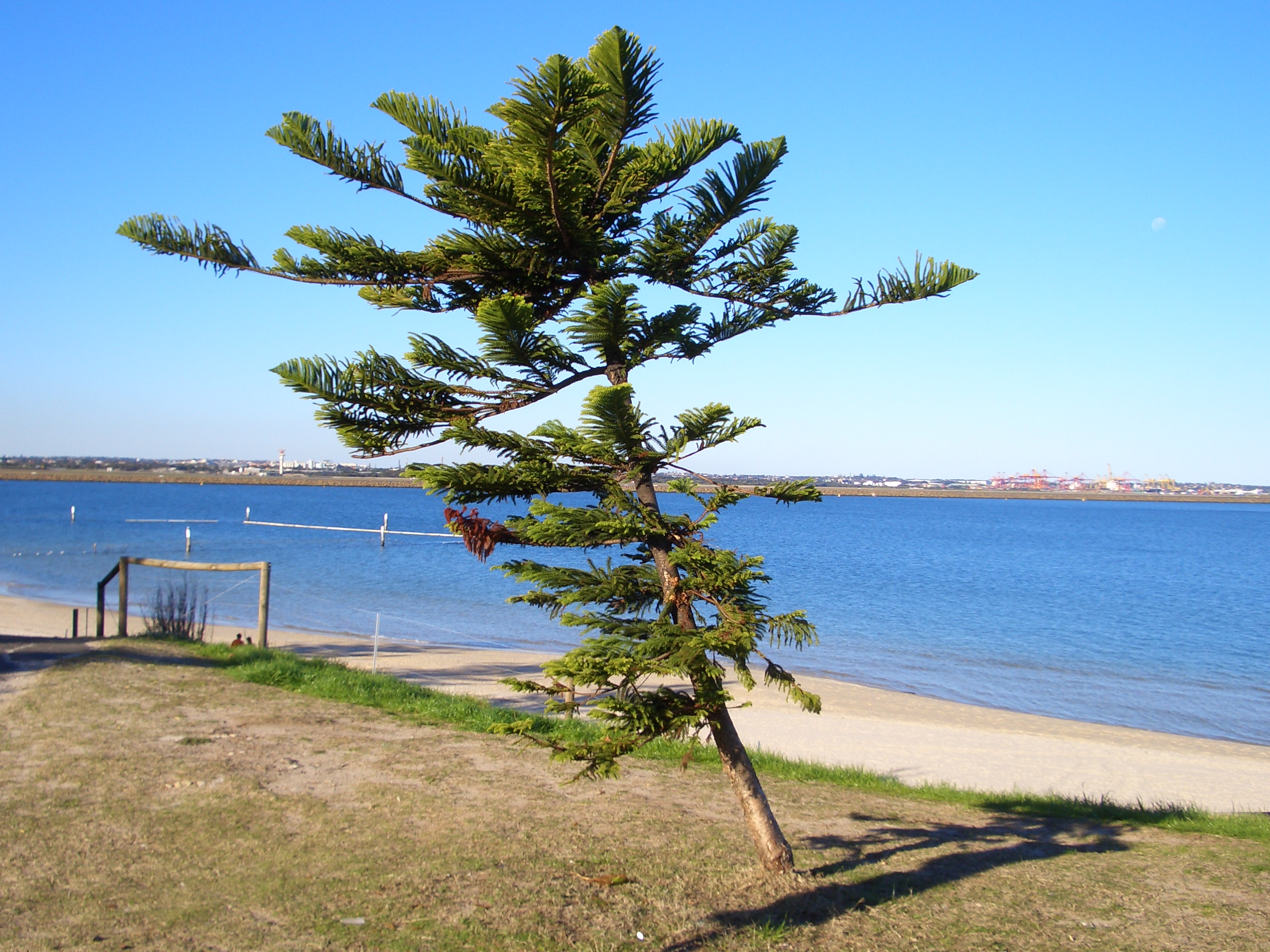
Lady Robinson Beach, Cook Park

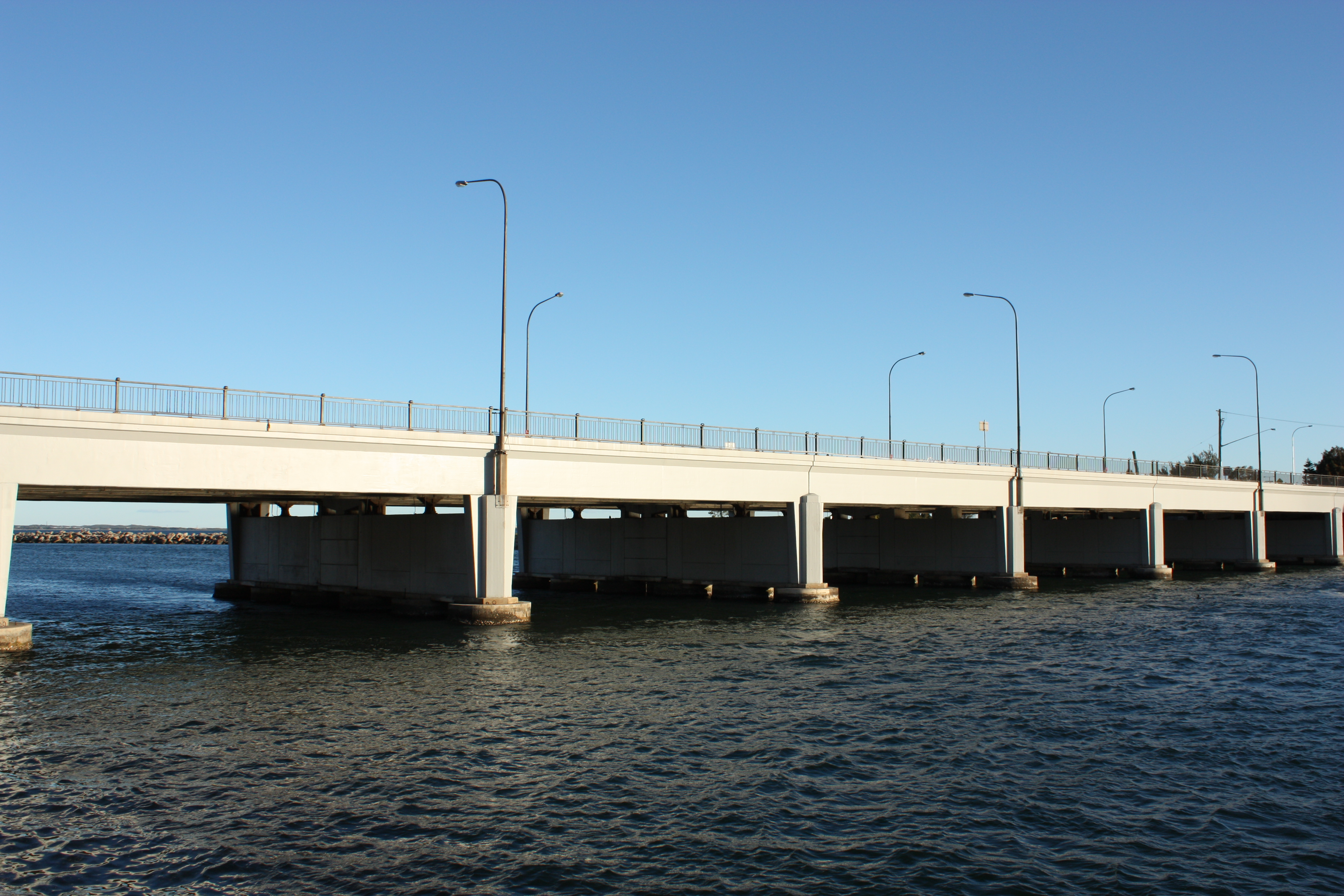
Endeavour Bridge and Cooks River

Kyeemagh is located on the southern bank of the Cooks River and the eastern bank of Muddy Creek. Lady Robinson Beach and Cook Park run along the eastern border. A small group of shops is located in Bestic Street near General Holmes Drive. Other parks include Kyeemagh Reserve and Lance Stoddert Reserve.

The Brighton Le Sands Amateur Fisherman's Association and TS Sirius, an Australian Navy Cadet unit, is located in Bestic Street, beside Muddy Creek.

The Endeavour Bridge links Kyeemagh to Sydney Airport, Botany and Mascot. The entrance of the M5 Motorway is also located here which links to Arncliffe, Kingsgrove, Beverly Hills and west to Liverpool and Campbelltown. Kyeemagh Public School is located on Beehag and Jacobson Avenues.

== Demographics ==
According to the 2021 census of Population, there were 935 people usually resident in Kyeemagh. The most common reported ancestries were Greek 26.1%, Australian 19.0%, English 10.1%, Lebanese 9.7% and Italian 6.1%. 59.1% of people were born in Australia. 46.8% of people spoke only English at home. Other languages spoken at home included Greek at 21.2%. The most common responses for religious affiliation were Eastern Orthodox 29.3%, Catholic 26.7% and No Religion 16.3%.
