= New Zealand at the 1982 Commonwealth Games =

- CG code: NZL
- CGA: New Zealand Olympic and Commonwealth Games Association
- Website: www.olympic.org.nz

in Brisbane, Australia
- Competitors: 112
- Flag bearer: Robin Tait
- Officials: 43
- Medals Ranked 5th: Gold 5 Silver 8 Bronze 13 Total 26

Commonwealth Games appearances (overview)
- 1930; 1934; 1938; 1950; 1954; 1958; 1962; 1966; 1970; 1974; 1978; 1982; 1986; 1990; 1994; 1998; 2002; 2006; 2010; 2014; 2018; 2022; 2026; 2030

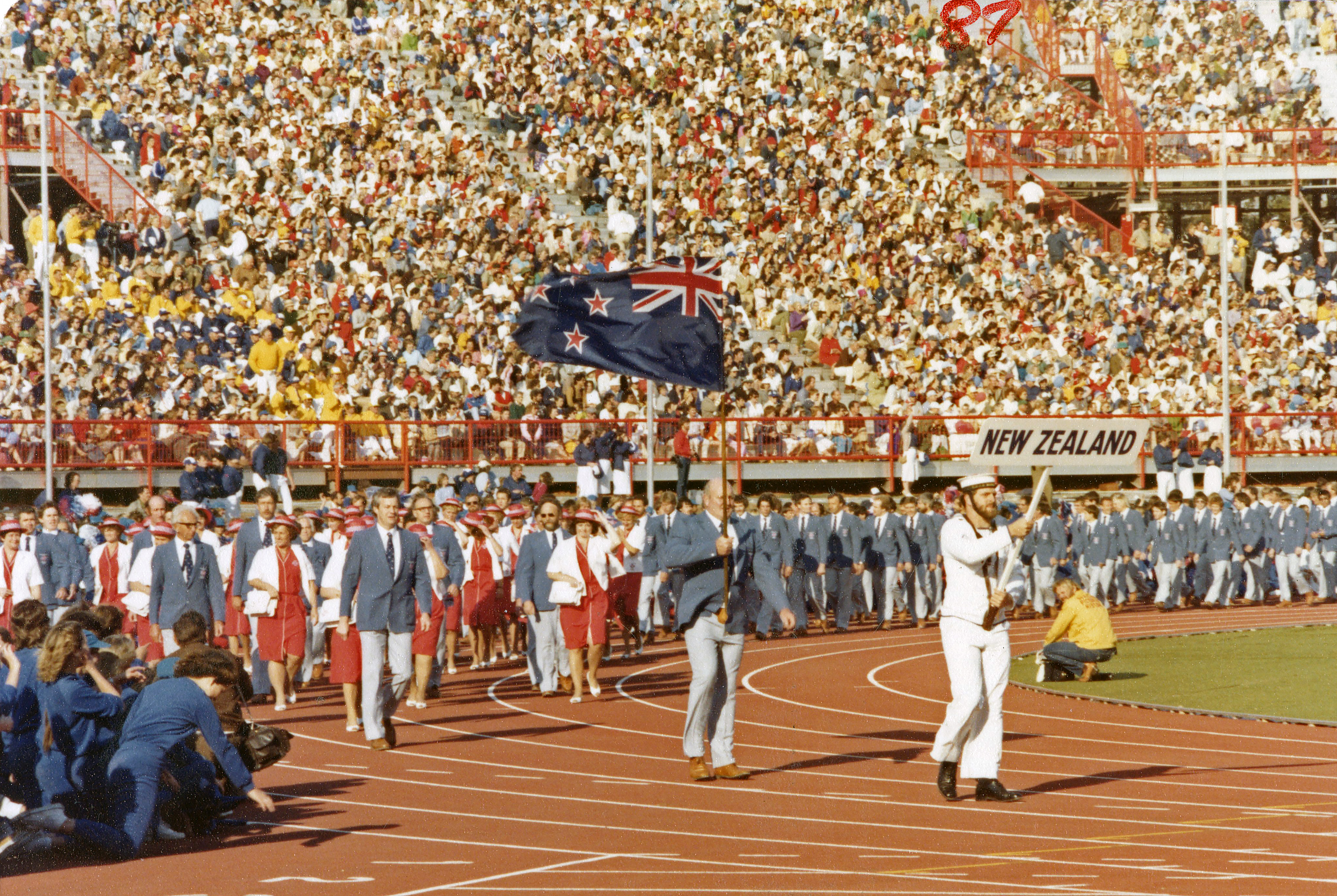
The New Zealand team at the opening ceremony in Brisbane, 1982

New Zealand at the 1982 Commonwealth Games was represented by a team of 112 competitors and 43 officials. The selection of the team for the Games in Brisbane, Australia, was the responsibility of the New Zealand Olympic and Commonwealth Games Association. New Zealand's flag bearer at the opening and closing ceremonies was veteran discus thrower Robin Tait. The New Zealand team finished fifth on the medal table, winning a total of 26 medals, five of which were gold.

New Zealand has competed in every games, starting with the British Empire Games in 1930 at Hamilton, Ontario.

== Medal tables ==
New Zealand was fifth on the medal table in 1982, with a total of 26 medals, including five gold.

Medal	Name	Sport	Event
Gold	Neroli Fairhall	Archery	Women's individual
Gold	Anne Audain	Athletics	Women's 3000 m
Gold	Mike O'Rourke	Athletics	Men's javelin throw
Gold	Craig Adair	Cycling	Men's 1 km time trial
Gold	John Woolley	Shooting	Open skeet
Silver	John Walker	Athletics	Men's 1500 m
Silver	Clem Captein; Brian Fowler; Graeme Miller; Murray Steele	Cycling	Men's 4000 m team pursuit
Silver	Mike McRedmond	Cycling	Men's 1000 m sprint
Silver	Rowan Brassey; Morgan Moffat; Danny O'Connor; Jim Scott	Lawn bowls	Men's fours
Silver	Pearl Dymond; Joyce Osborne; Jennie Simpson	Lawn bowls	Women's triples
Silver	Rex Hamilton; Barrie Wickins	Shooting	Open free pistol pairs
Silver	Ken Reinsfield	Wrestling	Men's welterweight
Silver	Steve Reinsfield	Wrestling	Men's light flyweight
Bronze	Lorraine Moller	Athletics	Women's 1500 m
Bronze	Lorraine Moller	Athletics	Women's 3000 m
Bronze	Stephen Walsh	Athletics	Men's long jump
Bronze	Robin Denton; Steve Wilson	Badminton	Mixed doubles
Bronze	Kevin Barry	Boxing	Men's light heavyweight
Bronze	Stephen Carton; Stephen Cox; Blair Stockwell; Jack Swart	Cycling	Men's 100 km team time trial
Bronze	Murray Steele	Cycling	Men's 1000 m sprint
Bronze	Roger Sumich	Cycling	Men's road race
Bronze	Mark Graham	Diving	Men's 3 m springboard
Bronze	Peter Belliss	Lawn bowls	Men's singles
Bronze	Pamela Croad; Kim Dewar; Melanie Jones; Gail Jonson	Swimming	Women's 4 × 100 m freestyle relay
Bronze	Chris Maddock	Wrestling	Men's bantamweight
Bronze	Nigel Sargent	Wrestling	Men's light heavyweight

Medals by sport
Sport	Gold medal	Silver medal	Bronze medal	Total
Athletics	2	1	3	6
Cycling	1	2	3	6
Shooting	1	1	0	2
Archery	1	0	0	1
Wrestling	0	2	2	4
Lawn bowls	0	2	1	3
Badminton	0	0	1	1
Boxing	0	0	1	1
Diving	0	0	1	1
Swimming	0	0	1	1
Total	5	8	13	26

Medals by gender
Gender	Gold medal	Silver medal	Bronze medal	Total
Male	2	6	9	17
Female	2	1	3	6
Mixed / open	1	1	1	3
Total	5	8	13	26

== Competitors ==
The following table lists the number of New Zealand competitors participating at the games according to gender and sport.

Sport	Men	Women	Total
Archery	0	2	2
Athletics	20	12	32
Badminton	5	3	8
Boxing	6	—N/a	6
Cycling	12	—N/a	12
Diving	2	2	4
Lawn bowls	7	3	10
Shooting	10	0	10
Swimming	9	6	15
Weightlifting	7	—N/a	7
Wrestling	6	—N/a	6
Total	84	28	112

== Archery ==
Athlete	Event	Total score	Rank
Neroli Fairhall	Women's individual	2373 pts	1st place, gold medalist(s)
Ann Shurrock	Women's individual	2327 pts	4

== Athletics ==
=== Track and road ===
Athlete	Event	Heat		Semifinal		Final	
Athlete	Event	Result	Rank (Note: Ranks given are within the heat)	Result	Rank (Note: Ranks given are within the semifinal)	Result	Rank
Anne Audain	Women's 3000 m	—N/a				8:45.53 GR	1st place, gold medalist(s)
Terry Genge	Women's 100 m hurdles	13.86	6	—N/a		did not advance	
Terry Genge	Women's 400 m hurdles	1:00.18	6	—N/a		did not advance	
Michael Gilchrist	Men's 1500 m	3:46.08	3 Q	—N/a		3:44.50	7
Don Greig	Men's marathon	—N/a				DNF	
Christine Hughes	Women's 800 m	2:06.52	3 Q	—N/a		2:04.87	7
Neil Lowsley	Men's 3000 m steeplechase	—N/a				8:47.23	11
Neil Lowsley	Men's 5000 m	—N/a				13:45.70	9
Lorraine Moller	Women's 1500 m	4:17.45	2 Q	—N/a		4:12.67	3rd place, bronze medalist(s)
Lorraine Moller	Women's 3000 m	—N/a				8:55.76	3rd place, bronze medalist(s)
Jenny Overall	Women's 1500 m	4:33.23	9	—N/a		did not advance	
Gary Palmer	Men's marathon	—N/a				DNF	
Mike Parker	Men's 30 km walk	—N/a				2:26:07	11
Peter Renner	Men's 3000 m steeplechase	—N/a				8:34.32	5
Peter Renner	Men's 5000 m	—N/a				13:45.00	8
Kim Robertson	Women's 200 m	DNS		—N/a		did not advance	
Kim Robertson	Women's 400 m	53.39	4 Q	52.94	4 Q	53.02	5
Janine Robson	Women's 400 m hurdles	1:01.17	5	—N/a		did not advance	
Dianne Rodger	Women's 1500 m	4:16.87	5 q	—N/a		4:13.10	4
Dianne Rodger	Women's 3000 m	—N/a				9:06.05	4
Tony Rogers	Men's 1500 m	3:45.70	4 q	—N/a		3:45.11	8
Kevin Ryan	Men's marathon	—N/a				2:13:42	5
Tim Soper	Men's 110 m hurdles	DNF		—N/a		did not advance	
Kevin Taylor	Men's 30 km walk	—N/a				2:37:37	15
John Walker	Men's 800 m	1:54.67	4 Q	1:51.68	4 Q	1:46.23	4
John Walker	Men's 1500 m	3:47.26	1 Q	—N/a		3:43.11	2nd place, silver medalist(s)
John Walker	Men's 5000 m	—N/a				DNS	
Christine Hughes; Janine Robson; Kim Robertson; Terry Genge	Women's 4 × 400 m relay	—N/a				3:40.63	6

=== Field ===
Athlete	Event	Qualifying		Final	
Athlete	Event	Result	Rank	Result	Rank
Pamela Hendren	Women's long jump		Q	6.33 m	8
Noeline Hodgins	Women's long jump		Q	6.27 m	9
David Hookway	Men's javelin throw	—N/a		69.72 m	8
Glenda Hughes	Women's shot put	—N/a		14.13 m	9
Terry Lomax	Men's high jump	—N/a		2.10 m	11
Kieran McKee	Men's pole vault	—N/a		4.70 m	7
Mike O'Rourke	Men's javelin throw	—N/a		89.48 m GR	1st place, gold medalist(s)
Mark Robinson	Men's discus throw	—N/a		NM	–
Robin Tait	Men's discus throw	—N/a		54.22 m	8
Roger Te Puni	Men's high jump	—N/a		2.13 m	8
Stephen Walsh	Men's long jump	—N/a		7.75 m	3rd place, bronze medalist(s)

=== Combined ===
Men's decathlon

Athlete	100 m	Long jump	Shot put	High jump	400 m	110 m hurdles	Discus throw	Pole vault	Javelin throw	1500 m	Overall points	Rank
Peter Dyer	11.42; 705 pts	6.96 m 812 pts	11.92 m 594 pts	1.83 m 707 pts	49.38; 833 pts	16.38; 714 pts	41.76 m 720 pts	4.30 m 884 pts	59.20 m 751 pts	4:28.99; 596 pts	7316 pts	5

Women's heptathlon

Athlete	100 m hurdles	Shot put	High jump	200 m	Long jump	Javelin throw	800 m	Overall points	Rank
Karen Forbes	15.05; 743 pts	11.00 m 656 pts	1.65 m 885 pts	25.55; 799 pts	5.80 m 862 pts	26.52 m 534 pts	2:18.42; 809 pts	5288 pts	9
Terry Genge	14.11; 852 pts	12.42 m 745 pts	1.62 m 854 pts	25.33; 818 pts	5.91 m 886 pts	34.02 m 669 pts	2:14.96; 855 pts	5679 pts	5

== Badminton ==
=== Singles ===
Athlete	Event	Round of 64	Round of 32	Round of 16	Quarterfinal	Semifinal	Final / BM	Rank
Athlete	Event	Opposition Result	Opposition Result	Opposition Result	Opposition Result	Opposition Result	Opposition Result	Rank
Chris Bullen	Men's singles	Bye	Shaylor (SCO); W 15–5 15–7	Sutton (WAL); W 15–12 15–7	Yates (ENG); L 3–15 6–15	did not advance		
Robin Denton	Women's singles	Underwood (NIR); L 7–11 4–11	did not advance					
John Miles	Men's singles	Moore (IOM); W 15–4 15–3	White (SCO); L 7–15 15–4 5–15	did not advance				
Graeme Robson	Men's singles	Bye	Gandhe (IND); L 9–15 9–15	did not advance				
Allison Sinton	Women's singles	Bye	Cannell (IOM); W 11–3 11–1	Ghia (IND); L 10–12 8–11	did not advance			
Toni Whittaker	Women's singles	Bye	Andrews (NIR); W 11–2 11–0	Beckman (ENG); L 3–11 2–11	did not advance			
Steve Wilson	Men's singles	Bridge (ENG); L 4–15 8–15	did not advance					

=== Doubles ===
Athlete	Event	Round of 64	Round of 32	Round of 16	Quarterfinal	Semifinal	Final / BM	Rank
Athlete	Event	Opposition Result	Opposition Result	Opposition Result	Opposition Result	Opposition Result	Opposition Result	Rank
Chris Bullen; Graeme Robson	Men's doubles	—N/a	Bye	Dew / Yates (ENG); L 13–15 7–15	did not advance			
Phil Horne; Steve Wilson	Men's doubles	—N/a	Gallagher / Hamilton (SCO); W 15–8 15–10	Freitag / MacDougall (CAN); L 7–15 15–6 14–18	did not advance			
Robin Denton; Toni Whittaker	Women's doubles	—N/a	Bye	Crossan / Underwood (NIR); W 15–9 5–15 15–6	Chapman / Podger (ENG); L 11–15 3–15	did not advance		
Robin Denton; Steve Wilson	Mixed doubles	Wong / Chan (HKG); W 18–16 18–16	Underwood / McIlwaine (NIR); W 15–4 15–6	Singh / Singh (IND); W 15–6 15–2	Backhouse / Johnson (CAN); W 15–9 13–18 15–3	Chapman / Dew (ENG); L 11–15 10–15	Cunningham / James (AUS); W 15–5 15–1	3rd place, bronze medalist(s)
Allison Sinton; Phil Horne	Mixed doubles	Bye	Skillings / Priestman (CAN); L 15–9 15–17 12–15	did not advance				
Toni Whittaker; Graeme Robson	Mixed doubles	Bye	Tong / Kwok (HKG); W 15–10 15–2	Cunningham / James (AUS); L 15–5 10–15 3–15	did not advance			

=== Teams ===
Athlete	Event	Group stage					Semifinal	Final / BM	Rank
Athlete	Event	Opposition Result	Opposition Result	Opposition Result	Opposition Result	Opposition Result	Opposition Result	Opposition Result	Rank
Chris Bullen; Robin Denton; Phil Horne; John Miles; Graeme Robson; Allison Sinton; Toni Whittaker; Steve Wilson	Mixed team	Canada; L 1–4	Malaysia; W 4–1	Isle of Man; W 5–0	Zimbabwe; W 5–0	Hong Kong; W 5–0	England; L 0–5	Australia; L 2–3	4

== Boxing ==
Athlete	Event	Round of 32	Round of 16	Quarterfinal	Semifinal	Final	Rank
Athlete	Event	Opposition Result	Opposition Result	Opposition Result	Opposition Result	Opposition Result	Rank
Peter Warren	Bantamweight	—N/a	Webb (NIR); L	did not advance			
Billy Meehan	Featherweight	—N/a	Ruru (PNG); W	Konyegwachie (NGR); L	did not advance		
Michael Sykes	Lightweight	—N/a	Tink (AUS); L	did not advance			
Apelu Ioane	Light welterweight	Bye	Ossai (NGR); L	did not advance			
Steven Renwick	Welterweight	—N/a	Pyatt (ENG); L	did not advance			
Kevin Barry	Light heavyweight	—N/a	Ah Hoy (SAM); W	Mudire (KEN); W	Kirisa (UGA); L WO	Did not advance	3rd place, bronze medalist(s)

== Cycling ==
=== Road ===
Athlete	Event	Time	Rank
Stephen Cox	Men's individual road race	4:36:36.32	14
Blair Stockwell	Men's individual road race	4:40:27.42	20
Roger Sumich	Men's individual road race	4:34:41.35	3rd place, bronze medalist(s)
Jack Swart	Men's individual road race	4:36:36.45	15
Stephen Carton; Stephen Cox; Blair Stockwell; Jack Swart	Men's 100 km team time trial	2:10:55.96	3rd place, bronze medalist(s)

=== Track ===
Men's 1000 m sprint

Athlete	Round 1	First-round repechages	Round 2	Second-round repechages	Quarterfinals	Semifinals	Final / BM	Rank
Athlete	Opposition Result	Opposition Result	Opposition Result	Opposition Result	Opposition Result	Opposition Result	Opposition Result	Rank
Clem Captein	Wilson (AUS); L	Altwasser (CAN); L	did not advance					
Mike McRedmond	Altwasser (CAN); W 11.668	Bye	Lacouline (CAN); W 11.635	Bye	Tinsley (ENG); W 11.532, W 11.393	Weller (JAM); W 11.703, W 11.624	Tucker (AUS); L, L	2nd place, silver medalist(s)
Murray Steele	Ongaro (CAN); L	Cockerton (ZIM); W 13.136	Weller (JAM); W 12.159	Bye	Wilson (AUS); W 12.249, L, W 12.189	Tucker (AUS); L, L	Weller (JAM); W 11.520, W 11.473	3rd place, bronze medalist(s)

Men's 1 km time trial

Athlete	Time	Rank
Craig Adair	1:06.954	1st place, gold medalist(s)
Anthony Cuff	1:10.362	9
Murray Steele	1:07.984	5

Men's 4000 m pursuit

Athlete	Event	Qualification		Quarter-finals	Semifinals	Final / BM	Rank
Athlete	Event	Time	Rank	Opponent Result	Opponent Result	Opponent Result	Rank
Craig Adair	Individual pursuit	4:57.287	5 Q	Wallace (ENG); L	did not advance		5
Anthony Cuff	Individual pursuit	4:58.088	6 Q	Stieda (CAN); L	did not advance		6
Brian Fowler	Individual pursuit	4:58.362	8 Q	Turtur (AUS); L	did not advance		8
Clem Captein; Brian Fowler; Graeme Miller; Murray Steele	Team pursuit	4:36.038	2 Q	—N/a	Canada; W 4:30.623	Australia; L	2nd place, silver medalist(s)

Men's 10 miles scratch race

Athlete	Time	Rank
Craig Adair	19:57.190	5
Anthony Cuff	20:09.110	23
Graeme Miller	19:57.924	10

== Diving ==
Athlete	Event	Points	Rank
Kay Cummings	Women's 3 m springboard	351.09	13
Kay Cummings	Women's 10 m platform	301.08	8
Ann Fargher	Women's 3 m springboard	377.55	11
Mark Graham	Men's 3 m springboard	551.46	3rd place, bronze medalist(s)
Gary Lamb	Men's 3 m springboard	463.32	8

== Lawn bowls ==
Athlete	Event	Round robin															Rank
Athlete	Event	Opposition Score	Opposition Score	Opposition Score	Opposition Score	Opposition Score	Opposition Score	Opposition Score	Opposition Score	Opposition Score	Opposition Score	Opposition Score	Opposition Score	Opposition Score	Opposition Score	Opposition Score	Rank
Peter Belliss	Men's singles	Corkill (NIR); W 21–3	Tso (HKG); W 21–10	Gaunder (FIJ); W 21–11	Beare (ZIM); L 15–21	Parrella (AUS); W 21–18	Hankey (ZAM); W 21–15	Thackray (BOT); W 21–10	Gill (CAN); W 21–15	Green (SWZ); W 21–10	Windsor (ENG); W 21–15	Croft (PNG); W 21–6	Wood (SCO); L 7–21	—N/a			3rd place, bronze medalist(s)
Ian Dickison; Phil Skoglund	Men's pairs	Wales; L 17–24	Fiji; L 19–21	Botswana; W 40–8	Zimbabwe; W 21–17	Zambia; W 47–5	Australia; D 16–16	Canada; W 28–10	Scotland; L 21–24	Papua New Guinea; W 30–9	Northern Ireland; L 16–20	England; W 25–19	Kenya; W 50–5	Hong Kong; L 16–19	Jersey; D 17–17	—N/a	6
Rowan Brassey; Morgan Moffat; Danny O'Connor; Jim Scott	Men's fours	Northern Ireland; L 13–21	Fiji; W 27–11	Wales; W 29–11	Papua New Guinea; W 20–16	Botswana; W 27–20	Hong Kong; W 27–14	England; W 20–19	Canada; W 39–7	Australia; L 14–28	Zambia; W 25–8	Zimbabwe; W 24–11	Swaziland; W 41–8	Scotland; W 19–12	—N/a		2nd place, silver medalist(s)
Pearl Dymond; Jennifer Simpson; Joyce Osborne	Women's triples	Kenya; W 26–7	Scotland; W 23–19	Zambia; L 13–18	Western Samoa; L 14–15	Wales; W 18–14	Papua New Guinea; W 18–16	Swaziland; W 28–17	Canada; W 20–12	Botswana; W 23–5	England; W 30–10	Hong Kong; W 26–12	Fiji; W 23–7	Zimbabwe; W 24–14	Northern Ireland; L 14–20	Australia; L 11–20	2nd place, silver medalist(s)

== Shooting ==
=== Pistol ===
Athlete	Event	Points	Rank
Rex Hamilton	Open air pistol	562	10
Rex Hamilton	Open free pistol	537	5
Rex Hamilton	Open centre-fire pistol	545	16
Barrie Wickins	Open air pistol	559	13
Barrie Wickins	Open free pistol	532	6
Rex Hamilton; Barrie Wickins	Open air pistol pairs	1113	4
Rex Hamilton; Barrie Wickins	Open free pistol pairs	1075	2nd place, silver medalist(s)

=== Rifle ===
Athlete	Event	Points	Rank
Leon Griebel	Open small-bore rifle prone	1169	12
John Hastie	Open full-bore rifle	375	19
Jack Scott	Open small-bore rifle prone	1162	18
John Whiteman	Open full-bore rifle	383	5
Leon Griebel; Jack Scott	Open small-bore rifle prone pairs	1167	9
John Hastie; John Whiteman	Open full-bore rifle pairs	557	6

=== Shotgun ===
Athlete	Event	Points	Rank
Robin Collins	Open trap	178	11
Graham Geater	Open trap	169	18
Paul McGowan	Open skeet	181	14
John Woolley	Open skeet	197 GR	1st place, gold medalist(s)
Robin Collins; Graham Geater	Open trap pairs	176	6
Paul McGowan; John Woolley	Open skeet pairs	187	4

== Swimming ==
Athlete	Event	Heat		Final	
Athlete	Event	Result	Rank	Result	Rank
Brett Austin	Men's 100 m breaststroke	1:06.48	7 Q	1:06.62	8
Brett Austin	Men's 200 m breaststroke	2:26.91	14	did not advance	
Pamela Croad	Women's 100 m butterfly	1:07.81	12	did not advance	
Pamela Croad	Women's 100 m freestyle	1:00.34	10	did not advance	
Pamela Croad	Women's 200 m freestyle	2:13.17	12	did not advance	
Ursula Cross	Women's 100 m backstroke	1:06.12	10	did not advance	
Ursula Cross	Women's 100 m backstroke	2:24.38	11	did not advance	
Mike Davidson	Men's 400 m freestyle	4:01.85	10	did not advance	
Mike Davidson	Men's 1500 m freestyle	16:06.05	11	did not advance	
Kim Dewar	Women's 100 m breaststroke	1:16.48	11	did not advance	
Kim Dewar	Women's 200 m breaststroke	2:44.26	12	did not advance	
Kim Dewar	Women's 400 m individual medley	5:14.39	12	did not advance	
Grant Forbes	Men's 100 m breaststroke	1:06.56	8 Q	1:05.86	6
Grant Forbes	Men's 200 m breaststroke	2:25.59	11	did not advance	
Melanie Jones	Women's 100 m backstroke	1:07.95	11	did not advance	
Melanie Jones	Women's 200 m backstroke	2:22.29	10	did not advance	
Gail Jonson	Women's 200 m individual medley	2:25.24	9	did not advance	
Gail Jonson	Women's 400 m individual medley	5:10.06	11	did not advance	
Mark Kalaugher	Men's 100 m breaststroke	1:06.73	10	did not advance	
Mark Kalaugher	Men's 200 m breaststroke	2:23.32	6 Q	2:22.24	6
Paul Kingsman	Men's 100 m backstroke	1:00.45	9	did not advance	
Paul Kingsman	Men's 200 m backstroke	2:09.31	8 Q	2:10.65	8
Anthony Mosse	Men's 100 m butterfly	56.40	16	did not advance	
Anthony Mosse	Men's 200 m butterfly	2:03.32	8 Q	2:02.76	7
Murray Parker	Men's 100 m butterfly	58.92	24	did not advance	
Murray Parker	Men's 100 m freestyle	54.77	22	did not advance	
Murray Parker	Men's 200 m freestyle	1:57.33	15	did not advance	
Barry Salisbury	Men's 100 m freestyle	54.03	19	did not advance	
Barry Salisbury	Men's 200 m individual medley	2:10.64	8 Q	2:11.79	8
Megan Tohill	Women's 100 m butterfly	1:05.04	8 Q	1:05.03	8
Megan Tohill	Women's 200 m butterfly	2:24.06	10	did not advance	
Rick Wells	Men's 100 m freestyle	54.16	20	did not advance	
Rick Wells	Men's 200 m freestyle	1:55.05	13	did not advance	
Murray Parker; Barry Salisbury; Mike Davidson; Rick Wells	Men's 4 × 100 m freestyle relay	—N/a		3:35.50	6
Rick Wells; Mike Davidson; Murray Parker; Anthony Mosse	Men's 4 × 200 m freestyle relay	—N/a		7:46.83	4
Paul Kingsman; Brett Austin; Anthony Mosse; Barry Salisbury	Men's 4 × 100 m medley relay	—N/a		3:56.58	5
Pamela Croad; Melanie Jones; Kim Dewar; Gail Jonson	Women's 4 × 100 m freestyle relay	—N/a		4:07.14	3rd place, bronze medalist(s)
Ursula Cross; Kim Dewar; Megan Tohill; Pamela Croad	Women's 4 × 100 m medley relay	—N/a		4:33.97	4

== Weightlifting ==
Athlete	Event	Snatch	Clean and jerk	Total	Rank
Kevin Judson	Featherweight	100.0 kg	127.5 kg	227.5 kg	5
Terry Williams	Lightweight	110.0 kg	145.0 kg	255.0 kg	7
Michael Bernard	Middleweight	125.0 kg	165.0 kg	290.0 kg	5
Phillip Sue	Middleweight	125.0 kg	160.0 kg	285.0 kg	6
Allister Nalder	Light heavyweight	132.5 kg	165.0 kg	297.5 kg	6
Peter Back	Middle heavyweight	130.0 kg	172.5 kg	302.5 kg	7
John Callaghan	Middle heavyweight	145.0 kg	172.5 kg	317.5 kg	6

== Wrestling ==
Athlete	Event	Elimination rounds			Final / BM	Rank
Athlete	Event	Opposition Result	Opposition Result	Opposition Result	Opposition Result	Rank
Steve Reinsfield	Light flyweight	Steain (AUS); W 4–0	Cooper (CAN); W 3.5–0.5		Sarang (IND); L 0–4	2nd place, silver medalist(s)
Graeme Hawkins	Flyweight		Proctor (SCO); W 4–0		Hoyt (AUS); L 0–2	4
Chris Maddock	Bantamweight		Kumar (IND); L 0.5–3.5	Cumming (AUS); W 4–0	Ubakha (NGR); W 3–1	3rd place, bronze medalist(s)
Tony Goodrick	Featherweight	Dunbar (ENG); W 3–1	Brown (AUS); L 1–3		Atasie (NGR); L 1–3	4
Ken Reinsfield	Welterweight	Halpin (SCO); W 4–0	Green (AUS); W 3–1		Singh (IND); L 1–3	2nd place, silver medalist(s)
Nigel Sargent	Light heavyweight		Davis (CAN); L 0.5–3.5	Balogun (NGR); W 4–0	Weir (NIR); W 4–0	3rd place, bronze medalist(s)

== Officials ==
- Team manager – Bruce Ullrich
- Weightlifting section manager – Dick Harris

== See also ==
- New Zealand Olympic Committee
- New Zealand at the Commonwealth Games
- New Zealand at the 1980 Summer Olympics
- New Zealand at the 1984 Summer Olympics
