= List of Commonwealth Games medallists in archery =

This is the complete list of Commonwealth Games medallists in archery, an event that has taken place twice, at the 1982 Commonwealth Games and 2010 Commonwealth Games.

== Medallists ==
=== Men's recurve individual ===
Event	Gold	Silver	Bronze
1982	Mark Blenkarne (ENG)	Roger Lemay (CAN)	Michael Coen (AUS)
2010	Rahul Banerjee (IND)	Jason Lyon (CAN)	Jayanta Talukdar (IND)

=== Men's recurve team ===
Event	Gold	Silver	Bronze
2010	Australia (AUS); Matthew Gray; Mathew Masonwells and Taylor Worth	Malaysia (MAS); Muhammad Abdul Rahim; Cheng Chu Sian and Arif Ibrahim Putra	India (IND); Rahul Banerjee; Tarundeep Rai and Jayanta Talukdar

=== Men's compound individual ===
Event	Gold	Silver	Bronze
2010	Duncan Busby (ENG)	Christopher White (ENG)	Septimus Cilliers (RSA)

=== Men's compound team ===
Event	Gold	Silver	Bronze
2010	England (ENG); Duncan Busby; Liam Grimwood and Christopher White	India (IND); Ritul Chatterjee and Jignas Chittibomma; Chinna Raju Srither	South Africa (RSA); Nico Benade; Septimus Cilliers and Kobus de Wet

=== Women's recurve individual ===
Event	Gold	Silver	Bronze
1982	Neroli Fairhall (NZL)	Janet Yates (NIR)	Lucille Lemay (CAN)
2010	Deepika Kumari (IND)	Alison Williamson (ENG)	Dola Banerjee (IND)

=== Women's recurve team ===
Event	Gold	Silver	Bronze
2010	India (IND); Dola Banerjee; Deepika Kumari and Bombayla Devi Laishram	England (ENG); Naomi Folkard; Amy Oliver and Alison Williamson	Canada (CAN); Marie-Pier Beaudet; Alana Macdougall and Kateri Vrakking

=== Women's compound individual ===
Event	Gold	Silver	Bronze
2010	Nicky Hunt (ENG)	Doris Jones (CAN)	Cassie McCall (AUS)

=== Women's compound team ===
Event	Gold	Silver	Bronze
2010	England (ENG); Danielle Brown; Nicky Hunt and Nichola Simpson	Canada (CAN); Camille Bouffard-Demers; Doris Jones and Ashley Wallace	India (IND); Bheigyabati Chanu; Jhano Hansdah and Gagandeep Kaur
