= Cycling at the 1982 Commonwealth Games =

- Venue: Track: Chandler Velodrome; Road: Chandler, Belmont, Mackenzie
- Location: Brisbane, Australia
- Dates: 30 September to 9 October 1982

Cycling at the 1982 Commonwealth Games was the 11th appearance of Cycling at the Commonwealth Games. The events were held in Brisbane, Australia, from 30 September to 9 October 1982.

The track events were held at the outdoor Chandler Velodrome on the Chandler Sports Complex. The track was concrete and featured a 3,000 seating capacity grandstand. The circuit was 333 metres with 30 degrees banking.

The road race consisted of 13 laps of approximately 14.2 kilometres. It was effectively a loop around Mount Petrie, reaching Chandler, Belmont and Mackenzie, for a total of 183 kilometres.

Australia topped the cycling medal table, by virtue of winning four gold medals.

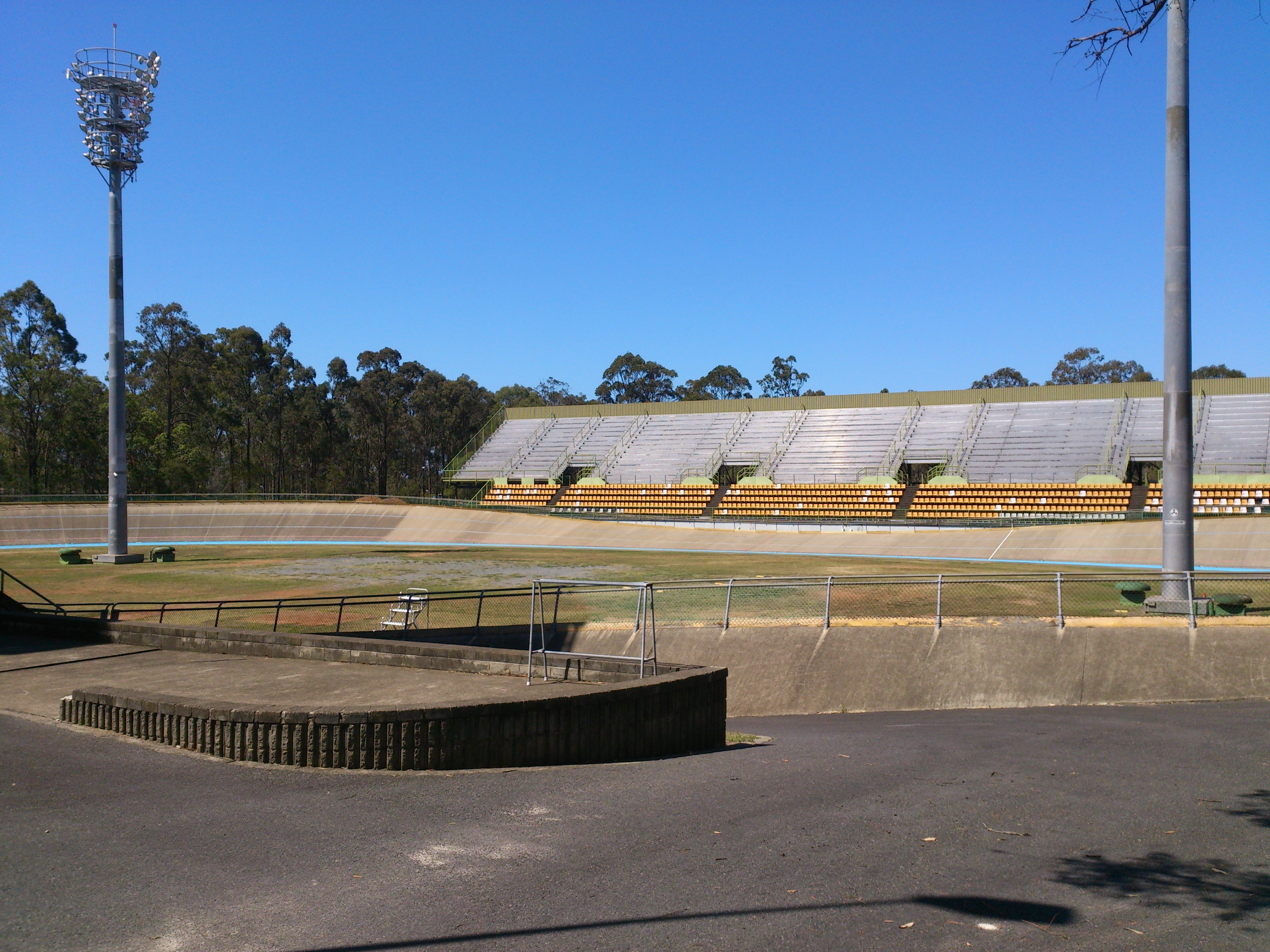
The Chandler Velodrome in 2014

== Medal table ==
* Host nation (Australia)

Rank	Nation	Gold	Silver	Bronze	Total
1	Australia*	4	3	1	8
2	England	2	1	2	5
3	New Zealand	1	2	3	6
4	Canada	0	1	1	2
Totals (4 entries)		7	7	7	21

== Medallists ==
Event	Gold	Silver	Bronze
Time trial	(New Zealand) Craig Adair	(Australia) Chris Wilson	(England) Terence Tinsley
Sprint	(Australia) Kenrick Tucker	(New Zealand) Mike McRedmond	(New Zealand) Murray Steele
Individual pursuit	(Australia) Mike Turtur	(England) Shaun Wallace	(Canada) Alex Stieda
Team pursuit	Australia	New Zealand	England
10 miles scratch	(Australia) Kevin Nichols	(Australia) Gary Hammond	(Australia) Mike Turtur
Road race	(England) Malcolm Elliott	(Canada) Steve Bauer	(New Zealand) Roger Sumich
Road team time trial	England	Australia	New Zealand

== Results ==
=== Individual road race (183 km) ===
Pos	Athlete	Time
1	(England) Malcolm Elliott	4:34:40.06
2	(Canada) Steve Bauer	4:34:41.00
3	(New Zealand) Roger Sumich	4:34:41.35
4	(England) Steve Lawrence	4:34:41.55
5	(Wales) Russell Harrington	4:34:42.01
6	(Wales) Keith Jones	4:36:34.58
7	(Isle of Man) Steve Joughin	4:36:35.02
8	(Northern Ireland) David Gardiner	4:36:35.20
9	(England) Mark Bell	4:36:35.42
10	(Canada) Louis Garneau	4:36:35.58
11	(Jersey) Tony Cornic	4:36:36.05
12	(Scotland) Bob Melrose	4:36:36.10
13	(Australia) Remo Sansonetti	4:36:36.21
14	(New Zealand) Stephen Cox	4:36:36.32
15	(New Zealand) Jack Swart	4:36:36.45
16	(England) Jeff Williams	4:36:36.58
17	(Isle of Man) Mark Gage	4:36:49.72
18	(Australia) Ricky Thomas Flood	4:38:47.10
19	(Canada) Eon D'Ornellas	4:40:27.39
20	(New Zealand) Blair Stockwell	4:40:27.42
21	(Canada) Gervais Rioux	4:43:12.13
22	(Scotland) James McGahan	4:45:08.65
23	(Wales) Colin Thornton	4:49:25.64
24	(Hong Kong) Chung-Yam Hung	4:49:26.40

=== Road team time trial (100 km) ===
RANK	1982 CG TEAM TIME TRIAL	TIME
	Joseph Waugh (ENG); Malcolm Elliott (ENG); Bob Downs (ENG); Steve Lawrence (ENG)	2:09:27.00
	John Watters (AUS); Remo Sansonetti (AUS); Ricky Flood (AUS); Michael Lynch (AUS)	2:09:33.620
	Blair Stockwell (NZL); Jack Swart (NZL); Stephen Carton (NZL); Stephen Cox (NZL)	2:10:55.960
4	David Gardiner (NIR); Alastair Irvine (NIR); Len Kirk (NIR); Billy Kerr (NIR)	2:11:23.380
5	Ken Clark (SCO); William Gibb (SCO); James McGahan (SCO); Bob Melrose (SCO)	2:11:31.670
6	Louis Garneau (CAN); Robert Pulfer (CAN); Bruce Spicer (CAN); Bernie Willock (CAN)	2:12:27.300
7	Peter Hamilton (WAL); Russell Harrington (WAL); John Pritchard (WAL); Colin Thornton (WAL)	2:14:00.870

=== 1,000m time trial ===
Pos	Athlete	Time
1	(New Zealand) Craig Adair	1:06.954
2	(Australia) Christopher Ernest Wilson	1:07.926
3	(England) Terence Tinsley	1:07.932
4	(Jamaica) David Weller	1:07.955
5	(New Zealand) Murray Steele	1:07.984
6	(Canada) Jocelyn Lovell	1:09.111
7	(England) Mark Barry	1:09.356
8	(Australia) Gary Ronald Hammond	1:09.730
9	(New Zealand) Anthony Cuff	1:10.362
10	(Isle of Man) Stephen Joughin	1:10.911
11	(Jamaica) Robert Ford	1:11.013
12	(England) Gary Sadler	1:11.132
13	(Canada) Alex Ongaro	1:11.358
14	(Australia) Frank William Parker	1:11.446
15	(Jamaica) Peter Aldridge	1:11.467
16	(Isle of Man) Gary Colin Hinds	1:13.549
17	(Jersey) Martin Koester	1:13.966
18	(Jersey) Tony Cornic	1:14.017
19	(Zimbabwe) Graham Cockerton	1:14.483
20	(Isle of Man) Stephen Porter	1:14.683
21	(Northern Ireland) Gordon Scott	1:15.285

=== 1,000 metres match sprint ===
RANK	1982 CG 1.000 MATCH SPRINT	TIME
	Kenrick Tucker (AUS)	—
	Mike McRedmond (NZL)	—
	Murray Steele (NZL)	—
4.	David Weller (JAM)	—
5.	Terrence Tinsley (ENG)	—
6.	Mark Barry (ENG)	—
7.	Alex Ongaro (CAN)	—
8.	Christopher Ernest Wilson (AUS)	—

Quarter finals

- Tucker bt Ongaro 2–0
- McRedmond bt Tinsley 2–0
- Steele bt Wilson 2–1
- Weller bt Barry 2–1

Semi finals

- Tucker bt Steele 2–0
- McRedmond bt Weller 2–0

Bronze

- Steele bt Weller 2–0

'Gold

- Tucker bt McRedmond 2–0

=== 4,000m individual pursuit ===
RANK	1982 CG 4.000 INDIVIDUAL PURSUIT
	Michael Turtur (AUS)
	Shaun Wallace (ENG)
	Alex Stieda (CAN)
4.	Michael Grenda (AUS)
5.	Craig Adair (NZL)
6.	Anthony Cuff (NZL)
7.	David Whitehall (SCO)
8.	Brian Fowler (NZL)

Quarter finals

- Wallace 4.52.675 bt Adair 4.53.560
- Turtur 4.52.374 bt Fowler 4.58.716
- Stieda 4.53.153 bt Cuff 4.54.995
- Grenda 4.53.877 bt Whitehall 4.57.435

Semi finals

- Wallace 4.51.855 bt Grenda 5.04.930
- Turtur 4.50.298 bt Stieda 4.52.648

Bronze

- Stieda 4.45.254 bt Grenda 4.55.869

'Gold

- Turtur 4.50.990 bt Wallace 4.51.347

=== 4,000 metres team pursuit ===
RANK	1982 CG 4.000 TEAM PURSUIT
	Gary West (AUS); Kevin Nichols (AUS); Michael Grenda (AUS); Michael Turtur (AUS)
	Brian Fowler (NZL); Clem Captein (NZL); Graeme Miller (NZL); Murray Steele (NZL)
	Tony Mayer (ENG); Darryl Webster (ENG); Gary Sadler (ENG); Paul Curran (ENG); Shaun Wallace (ENG)
4	Gary Trevisiol (CAN); Steve Bauer (CAN); Gary Altwasser (CAN); Alex Stieda (CAN)
5	Alastair Irvine (NIR); Len Kirk (NIR); David Gardiner (NIR); Gordon Scott (NIR)

Qualifying

- Australia 4.32.356
- New Zealand 4.36.038
- Canada 4.37.891
- England 4.38.253
- Northern Ireland 4.58.715

Semi finals

- Australia 4.27.097 bt England 4.33.925
- New Zealand 4.30.623 bt Canada 4.3?.295

Bronze

- England 4.34.783 bt Canada 4.37.464

'Gold

- Australia 4.26.090 bt New Zealand 4.29.733

=== 10 mile scratch race ===
Pos	Athlete	Time
1	(Australia) Kevin Nichols	19:56.559
2	(Australia) Gary Ronald Hammond	19:56.639
3	(Australia) Mike Turtur	19:56.660
4	(Canada) Steve Bauer	19:56.672
5	(New Zealand) Craig Adair	19:57.190
6	(Canada) Gary Altwasser	19:57.380
7	(Jamaica) Christopher Chong-Tenn	19:57.615
8	(England) Terence Tinsley	19:57.730
9	(England) Shaun Wallace	19:57.765
10	(New Zealand) Graeme Miller	19:57.924
11	(Canada) Alex Stieda	19:58.765
12	(Scotland) David Whitehall	20:00.120
13	(Isle of Man) Gary Colin Hinds	20:03.358
14	(Northern Ireland) Len Kirk	20:04.358
15	(Zimbabwe) Graham Cockerton	20:04.835
16	(Jamaica) Peter Aldridge	20:04.925
17	(Zimbabwe) Gavin Young	20:05.125
18	(Northern Ireland) Gordon Scott	20:06.312
19	(Isle of Man) Stephen Porter	20:06.671
20	(England) Paul Curran	20:07.108
21	(Jersey) Martin Koester	20:07.288
22	(Scotland) David Miller	20:08.882
23	(New Zealand) Anthony Cuff	20:09.110
24	(Wales) Peter Hamilton	20:12.268
25	(Jamaica) David Weller	20:18.301
26	(Northern Ireland) Alastair Irvine	20:19.680
