= Stephen Carton =

New Zealand cyclist (born 1961/62)

Personal information
- Full name: Stephen Mark Carton
- Born: 1961 or 1962 (age 64–65)

Sport
- Country: New Zealand
- Sport: Cycling
Medal record
Men's cycling
Representing New Zealand
Commonwealth Games
| Bronze medal – third place | 1982 Brisbane | 100 km team time trial |

Stephen Mark Carton (born 1961 or 1962) is a former New Zealand racing cyclist who won a bronze medal competing for his country at the 1982 Commonwealth Games.

Born in 1961 or 1962, Carton grew up in Lower Hutt. At the 1982 Commonwealth Games, he was a member of the New Zealand team in the 100 km team time trial with Stephen Cox, Blair Stockwell, and Jack Swart. During the event, Carton's chain jammed and the other three riders completed the course together, finishing third.

Carton later moved to Melbourne, Australia, to live.
