= Athletics at the 1982 Commonwealth Games – Women's 1500 metres =

Women's 1500 metres at the Commonwealth Games

The women's 1500 metres event at the 1982 Commonwealth Games was held on 8 and 9 October at the QE II Stadium in Brisbane, Australia.

== Medalists ==
Gold	Silver	Bronze
Christina Boxer; England	Gillian Dainty; England	Lorraine Moller; New Zealand

== Results ==
=== Heats ===
Qualification: First 4 in each heat (Q) and the next 2 fastest (q) qualify for the semifinals.

Rank	Heat	Name	Nationality	Time	Notes
1	1	Kim Lock	Wales	4:15.12	Q
2	1	Gillian Dainty	England	4:15.25	Q
3	1	Geri Fitch	Canada	4:15.36	Q
4	1	Justina Chepchirchir	Kenya	4:16.09	Q
5	2	Christina Boxer	England	4:16.32	Q
6	1	Dianne Rodger	New Zealand	4:16.87	q
7	2	Lorraine Moller	New Zealand	4:17.45	Q
8	2	Hilary Hollick	Wales	4:17.72	Q
9	2	Kathryn Pilling	England	4:18.02	Q
10	2	Yvonne Murray	Scotland	4:18.36	q
11	1	Debbie Scott	Canada	4:18.90	
12	2	Francine Gendron	Canada	4:22.06	
13	1	Linah Cheruiyot	Kenya	4:22.79	
14	1	Daphne Stevens-Grehan	Australia	4:25.00	
15	2	Megan Sloane	Australia	4:30.51	
16	1	Jenny Overall	New Zealand	4:33.23	
17	2	Salitia Muga	Papua New Guinea	5:01.68	
	2	Mary Chepkemboi	Kenya	DNS	

=== Final ===
Rank	Name	Nationality	Time	Notes
1st place, gold medalist(s)	Christina Boxer	England	4:08.28	
2nd place, silver medalist(s)	Gillian Dainty	England	4:10.80	
3rd place, bronze medalist(s)	Lorraine Moller	New Zealand	4:12.67	
4	Dianne Rodger	New Zealand	4:13.10	
5	Geri Fitch	Canada	4:13.40	
6	Kim Lock	Wales	4:14.02	
7	Kathryn Pilling	England	4:14.86	
8	Hilary Hollick	Wales	4:15.69	
9	Justina Chepchirchir	Kenya	4:15.86	
10	Yvonne Murray	Scotland	4:16.59	
