= Lucille Lemay =

Canadian archer (born 1950)

Personal information
- Full name: Lucille Goyette Lemay
- Nationality: Canadian
- Born: 20 July 1950 (age 76) Montreal, Quebec, Canada
- Height: 157 cm (5 ft 2 in)

Sport
- Country: Canada
- Sport: Archery
Medal record
Commonwealth Games
Bronze medal – third place	1982 Brisbane	Individual

Lucille Lemay (born 20 July 1950) is a Canadian archer.

Lemay competed at the 1976 Summer Olympics, where she finished 5th in the individual event, and at the 1984 Summer Olympics, where she finished 33rd in the individual event.

She won a bronze medal at the 1982 Commonwealth Games in the individual event.
