= Athletics at the 1982 Commonwealth Games – Women's 3000 metres =

Women's 3000 metres at the Commonwealth Games

The women's 3000 metres event at the 1982 Commonwealth Games was held on 4 October at the QE II Stadium in Brisbane, Australia.

== Results ==
| Rank | Name | Nationality | Time | Notes |
|---|---|---|---|---|
| 1st place, gold medalist(s) | Anne Audain | New Zealand | 8:45.53 | GR |
| 2nd place, silver medalist(s) | Wendy Smith | England | 8:48.47 | |
| 3rd place, bronze medalist(s) | Lorraine Moller | New Zealand | 8:55.76 | |
| 4 | Dianne Rodger | New Zealand | 9:06.05 | |
| 5 | Bev Bush | Canada | 9:12.02 | |
| 6 | Geri Fitch | Canada | 9:12.78 | |
| 7 | Deborah Peel | England | 9:15.37 | |
| 8 | Justina Chepchirchir | Kenya | 9:15.40 | |
| 9 | Hilary Hollick | Wales | 9:18.33 | |
| 10 | Yvonne Murray | Scotland | 9:21.45 | |
| 11 | Linah Cheruiyot | Kenya | 9:26.58 | |
| 12 | Debbie Scott | Canada | 9:32.20 | |
| 13 | Kim Lock | Wales | 9:36.00 | |
| 14 | Megan Sloane | Australia | 9:36.56 | |
| 15 | Yuko Gordon | Hong Kong | 10:24.50 | |
| | Ruth Smeeth | England | DNF | |
| | Mary Chepkemboi | Kenya | DNF | |
| | Salitia Muga | Papua New Guinea | DNS | |
