= Athletics at the 1982 Commonwealth Games – Men's 1500 metres =

Men's 1500 metres at the Commonwealth Games

The men's 1500 metres event at the 1982 Commonwealth Games was held on 8 and 9 October at the QE II Stadium in Brisbane, Australia.

== Medalists ==
| Gold | Silver | Bronze |
|---|---|---|
| Steve Cram; England | John Walker; New Zealand | Mike Boit; Kenya |

== Results ==
=== Heats ===
Qualification: First 3 in each heat (Q) and the next 1 fastest (q) qualify for the semifinals.

| Rank | Heat | Name | Nationality | Time | Notes |
|---|---|---|---|---|---|
| 1 | 1 | Steve Cram | England | 3:44.39 | Q |
| 2 | 1 | Michael Hillardt | Australia | 3:44.44 | Q |
| 3 | 3 | Graham Williamson | Scotland | 3:45.32 | Q |
| 4 | 1 | Wilson Waigwa | Kenya | 3:45.62 | Q |
| 5 | 1 | Tony Rogers | New Zealand | 3:45.70 | q |
| 6 | 3 | Mike Boit | Kenya | 3:45.93 | Q |
| 7 | 3 | Michael Gilchrist | New Zealand | 3:46.08 | Q |
| 8 | 3 | Paul Grinsted | Australia | 3:46.35 | |
| 9 | 3 | Ian Stewart | England | 3:46.74 | |
| 10 | 2 | John Walker | New Zealand | 3:47.26 | Q |
| 11 | 1 | Spyros Spyrou | Cyprus | 3:47.37 | |
| 12 | 2 | Pat Scammell | Australia | 3:47.54 | Q |
| 13 | 2 | Colin Reitz | England | 3:47.62 | Q |
| 14 | 2 | John Robson | Scotland | 3:47.89 | |
| 15 | 1 | Tap Jonga | Zimbabwe | 3:48.73 | |
| 16 | 3 | Richard Kermode | Fiji | 3:48.91 | |
| 17 | 1 | Maxwell Carver | Mauritius | 3:51.33 | |
| 18 | 2 | Archfel Musango | Zambia | 3:53.13 | |
| 19 | 1 | Yeung Sai Mo | Hong Kong | 4:04.64 | |
| 20 | 3 | Charlie Oliver | Solomon Islands | 4:07.59 | |
| 21 | 2 | Ilimotama Daku | Fiji | 4:08.76 | |
| 22 | 3 | Jolly Kapere | Malawi | 4:12.09 | |
| 23 | 1 | Bineshwar Prasad | Fiji | 4:15.40 | |
| 24 | 3 | Brian Yon | Saint Helena | 4:24.05 | |
| | 2 | John Chappory | Gibraltar | DNS | |
| | 2 | Roger Hackney | Wales | DNS | |

=== Final ===
| Rank | Name | Nationality | Time | Notes |
|---|---|---|---|---|
| 1st place, gold medalist(s) | Steve Cram | England | 3:42.37 | |
| 2nd place, silver medalist(s) | John Walker | New Zealand | 3:43.11 | |
| 3rd place, bronze medalist(s) | Mike Boit | Kenya | 3:43.33 | |
| 4 | Graham Williamson | Scotland | 3:43.84 | |
| 5 | Michael Hillardt | Australia | 3:44.03 | |
| 6 | Colin Reitz | England | 3:44.35 | |
| 7 | Michael Gilchrist | New Zealand | 3:44.50 | |
| 8 | Tony Rogers | New Zealand | 3:45.11 | |
| 9 | Wilson Waigwa | Kenya | 3:46.18 | |
| 10 | Pat Scammell | Australia | 3:46.62 | |
