= Melanie Jones (swimmer) =

New Zealand swimmer

Personal information
- Full name: Melanie Anne Jones
- Born: 1963 or 1964 (age 62–63)
- Spouse: Geoff Walker (m. 1990; died 1997)

Sport
- Sport: Swimming
- Strokes: Backstroke
- Club: Wharenui Swimming Club, Christchurch
Medal record
Representing New Zealand
Women's swimming
Commonwealth Games
Bronze medal – third place	1982 Brisbane	4×100 m freestyle relay

Melanie Anne Jones (born 1963 or 1964) is a former New Zealand swimmer. She won a bronze medal competing for her country at the 1982 Commonwealth Games.

== Swimming ==
A member of the Wharenui Swimming Club in Christchurch specialising in backstroke, Jones represented New Zealand at the 1978 and 1982 Commonwealth Games. She was also selected in the New Zealand swimming team for the 1980 Summer Olympics in Moscow, but she was unable to compete because of the partial boycott by New Zealand.

At the 1978 Commonwealth Games, Jones was ninth-fastest in the heats of the women's 100 metres backstroke and did not progress to the final. However, in the women's 200 metres backstroke, she was the sixth-fastest swimmer in qualifying, and went on the finish seventh in the final. She was also a member of the New Zealand women's 4×100 metres freestyle relay team—with Andrea Hawcridge, Penny McCarthy, and Rebecca Perrott—that was disqualified and finished sixth in the final.

Four years later, at the 1982 Commonwealth Games in Brisbane, Jones competed in the same three events. She was 11th and 10th, respectively, in the heats of the 100 metres and 200 metres backstroke, and consequently did not qualify for the finals. Swimming with Gail Jonson, Kim Dewar, and Pamela Croad in the women's 4×100 metres freestyle relay, she won a bronze medal.

== Later life ==
Jones retired from competitive swimming after the Brisbane Commonwealth Games, and became a lawyer in Christchurch. In 1990, she married canoeist Geoff Walker, who was one of only four New Zealanders to compete at the 1980 Moscow Olympics. The couple had four children, before Walker suffered a brain tumour in 1997 and died 10 months later.
