= Clem Captein =

New Zealand cyclist (born 1957)

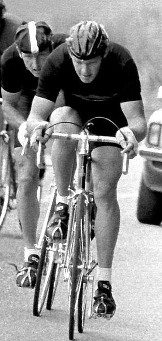
- Clem Captein Cycling in 1981.
- Born: 29 September 1957; Palmerston North, New Zealand
- Occupation: New Zealand cyclist

Clem Captein
Medal record

Representing New Zealand

Men's cycling

Commonwealth Games
Silver medal – second place	1982 Brisbane	Cycling

Clem Captein (born 29 September 1957) is a New Zealand Commonwealth Games silver medalist.

== Biography ==
He was born in Palmerston North, New Zealand to Dutch parents.

Captein won a silver medal in track cycling at the 1982 Commonwealth Games in the 4000m team pursuit.

After retiring from competitive cycling he became a successful farmer in the Waikato region, winning sharemilker of the year in 1990/1991.

== See also ==
- New Zealand at the 1982 Commonwealth Games
