= Mike McRedmond =

New Zealand cyclist (born 1958)

Personal information
- Full name: Michael John McRedmond
- Born: 1958 (age 67–68) Dannevirke, New Zealand
- Height: 1.85 m (6 ft 1 in)

Sport
- Country: New Zealand
- Sport: Cycling
- Event: Sprint
- Coached by: Max Vertongen
Medal record
Men's cycling
Representing New Zealand
Commonwealth Games
Silver medal – second place	1982 Brisbane	1000 m match sprint

Michael John McRedmond (born 1958) is a New Zealand cycling coach and former racing cyclist who won a silver medal competing for his country at the 1982 Commonwealth Games.

== Early life ==
Born in Dannevirke in 1958, McRedmond grew up in Palmerston North and was educated at St Peter's College.

== Cycling ==
=== Rider ===
McRedmond began competitive cycling after seeing the Tour of Manawatu cycle race, which had the finish of its final stage close to his family home. Without a natural talent for the sport, McRedmond says that he succeeded through hard work and perseverance:

I wasn't a great cyclist, but with training, hard work, determination and resilience I gradually got better. My philosophy is to be the best I can be so to achieve success I had to apply myself.

McRedmond represented New Zealand in the men's 1000 metres sprint at the 1982 and 1986 Commonwealth Games. At the 1982 games in Brisbane, he advanced unbeaten to the final, where he lost 0–2 to the defending champion, Kenrick Tucker from Australia, and so won the silver medal. Four years later, in Edinburgh, McRedmond placed sixth in the same event.

Domestically, McRedmond won the New Zealand national sprint title five times, and the national 15 kilometres scratch race title on three occasions. He later won a national Masters 80 kilometres road race championship.

=== Coach ===
After retiring from competitive cycling in 1986, McRedmond began coaching young cyclists in the 1990s. In about 2000, he started unpaid coaching at Palmerston North Boys' High School, where his protégés have included Jesse Sergent, Campbell Stewart, and Simon van Velthooven. Between 2005 and 2010, he was the national junior track cycling head coach.

McRedmond has received numerous accolades at the annual Manawatū Sportsperson of the Year Awards. He won the award for coach of the year in 2007, 2008, 2009, 2014, and 2015. In 2012, he was named Manawatū's sports personality of the year. In 2019, McRedmond was awarded a Paul Harris Fellowship by Milson Rotary, for services to cycling.

== Working life ==
McRedmond had a 41-year career in banking, beginning in 1976. He subsequently took a position as new vehicle consultant with Manawatū Toyota.

== Personal life ==
McRedmond and his wife, Natalie, have two daughters.
