= Kim Dewar =

New Zealand swimmer

Sport
- Sport: Swimming
- Strokes: Breaststroke
- Club: Wharenui Swimming Club, Christchurch
Medal record
Representing New Zealand
Women's swimming
Commonwealth Games
Bronze medal – third place	1982 Brisbane	4×100 m freestyle relay

Kim Dewar is a former New Zealand swimmer. She won a bronze medal competing for her country at the 1982 Commonwealth Games.

A member of the Wharenui Swimming Club in Christchurch specialising in breaststroke and individual medley, Dewar represented New Zealand at the 1982 Commonwealth Games in Brisbane. In the heats of her individual events, she finished 11th in the 100 metres breaststroke, 12th in the 200 metres breaststroke, and 12th in the 400 metres individual medley, and consequently did not qualify for the finals. Swimming with Gail Jonson, Melanie Jones, and Pamela Croad in the women's 4×100 metres freestyle relay, she won a bronze medal. She also swam in the women's 4×100 metres medley relay, with Megan Tohill, Pamela Croad, and Ursula Cross, finishing fourth in the final.
