= Croad =

Croad is a surname. Notable people with the surname include:

- Pamela Croad, New Zealand swimmer
- Trent Croad (born 1980), Australian footballer

== See also ==
- Croad Langshan, chicken breed
