= Janet Yates =

Northern Irish archer

Personal information
- Nationality: Northern Irish

Sport
- Sport: Archery
Medal record
Commonwealth Games
Silver medal – second place	1982 Brisbane	Individual

Janet Yates is a Northern Irish archer.

She represented Northern Ireland at the 1982 Commonwealth Games where she finished with 2373 points and won a silver medal.
