= Pamela Croad =

New Zealand swimmer

Sport
- Sport: Swimming
- Strokes: Freestyle, butterfly
- Club: Levin Swimming Club
Medal record
Representing New Zealand
Women's swimming
Commonwealth Games
Bronze medal – third place	1982 Brisbane	4×100 m freestyle relay

Pamela Croad is a former New Zealand swimmer. She won a bronze medal competing for her country at the 1982 Commonwealth Games.

A member of the Levin Swimming Club, Croad represented New Zealand at the 1982 Commonwealth Games in Brisbane. In the heats of her individual events, she finished 12th in the 100 metres butterfly, 10th in the 100 metres freestyle, and 12th in the 200 metres freestyle, and consequently did not qualify for the finals. Swimming with Gail Jonson, Melanie Jones, and Kim Dewar in the women's 4×100 metres freestyle relay, she won a bronze medal. She also swam in the women's 4×100 metres medley relay, with Megan Tohill, Kim Dewar, and Ursula Cross, finishing fourth in the final.
