= Archery at the Commonwealth Games =

Archery is one of the optional sports at the quadrennial Commonwealth Games competition. It has been a Commonwealth Games sport since 1982, but has only featured twice in the competition's history, at the 1982 Commonwealth Games and at the 2010 Commonwealth Games. It is an optional sport and may or may not be included in the sporting programme of each edition of the Games. The host country of the games decides whether to include it.

== Editions ==
Games	Year	Host city	Host country	Best nation
XII	1982	Brisbane, Queensland	Australia	England, New Zealand
XIX	2010	Delhi	India	England

== All-time medal table ==
Rank	Nation	Gold	Silver	Bronze	Total
1	England	5	3	0	8
2	India	3	1	4	8
3	Australia	1	0	2	3
4	New Zealand	1	0	0	1
5	Canada	0	4	2	6
6	Malaysia	0	1	0	1
6	Northern Ireland	0	1	0	1
8	South Africa	0	0	2	2
Totals (8 entries)		10	10	10	30
