= Peter Butler (runner) =

Canadian runner (born 1958)

Personal information
- Born: February 15, 1958 (age 68) Calgary, Canada

Sport
- Sport: Marathon running

Peter Butler (born February 15, 1958) is a former Canadian long-distance runner who was a national champion in the outdoor 5,000 metres and 10,000 metres. Butler competed in the men's 10,000 metres at the 1983 World Championships in Helsinki, Finland. At the 1985 California International Marathon, Butler set a course record with a time of 2:10:56. This time remains the fifth fastest marathon run by a Canadian.

== Achievements ==
Year	Competition	Venue	Position	Event	Notes
Representing Canada
1982	Commonwealth Games	Brisbane, Australia	15th	Marathon	2:18:17
1985	California International Marathon	Sacramento, United States	1st	Marathon	2:10:56
1986	Commonwealth Games	Edinburgh, Scotland	11th	Marathon	2:18:52
