= Craig Adair =

New Zealand cyclist

Personal information
- Full name: Craig Robert Adair
- Born: 31 January 1963 (age 63) Christchurch, New Zealand
- Height: 187 cm (6 ft 2 in)
- Weight: 87 kg (192 lb)

Cycling career
- Sport: Cycling
Medal record
Men's track cycling
Representing New Zealand
Commonwealth Games
Gold medal – first place	1982 Brisbane	1 km time trial

Craig Robert Adair (born 31 January 1963) is a New Zealand track cyclist.

Adair was born in Christchurch in 1963. Under the guidance of Wayne Thorpe, he represented New Zealand at the 1982 Commonwealth Games in Brisbane. Despite being a novice at the event and only 18 years old, Adair won the gold medal in the 1 km time trial. Adair then attended the 1984 Summer Olympics in Los Angeles, when he came fifth in the 1 km time trial. Later, Adair was the manager of the New Zealand track cycling team.

From 1987, he had various cycle shops under the trade name "Craig Adair Cycles" throughout Christchurch (on Colombo Street, Riccarton Road, and in Linwood City Mall). Adair was the event mechanic for the 1987 Coast to Coast, where a crash involving 20 cyclists cleaned him out of spare parts. In a landmark decision decided by the Court of Appeal, Adair lost a case against the Commerce Commission after having violated the Fair Trading Act 1986. His cycle shops went into receivership in 1994.

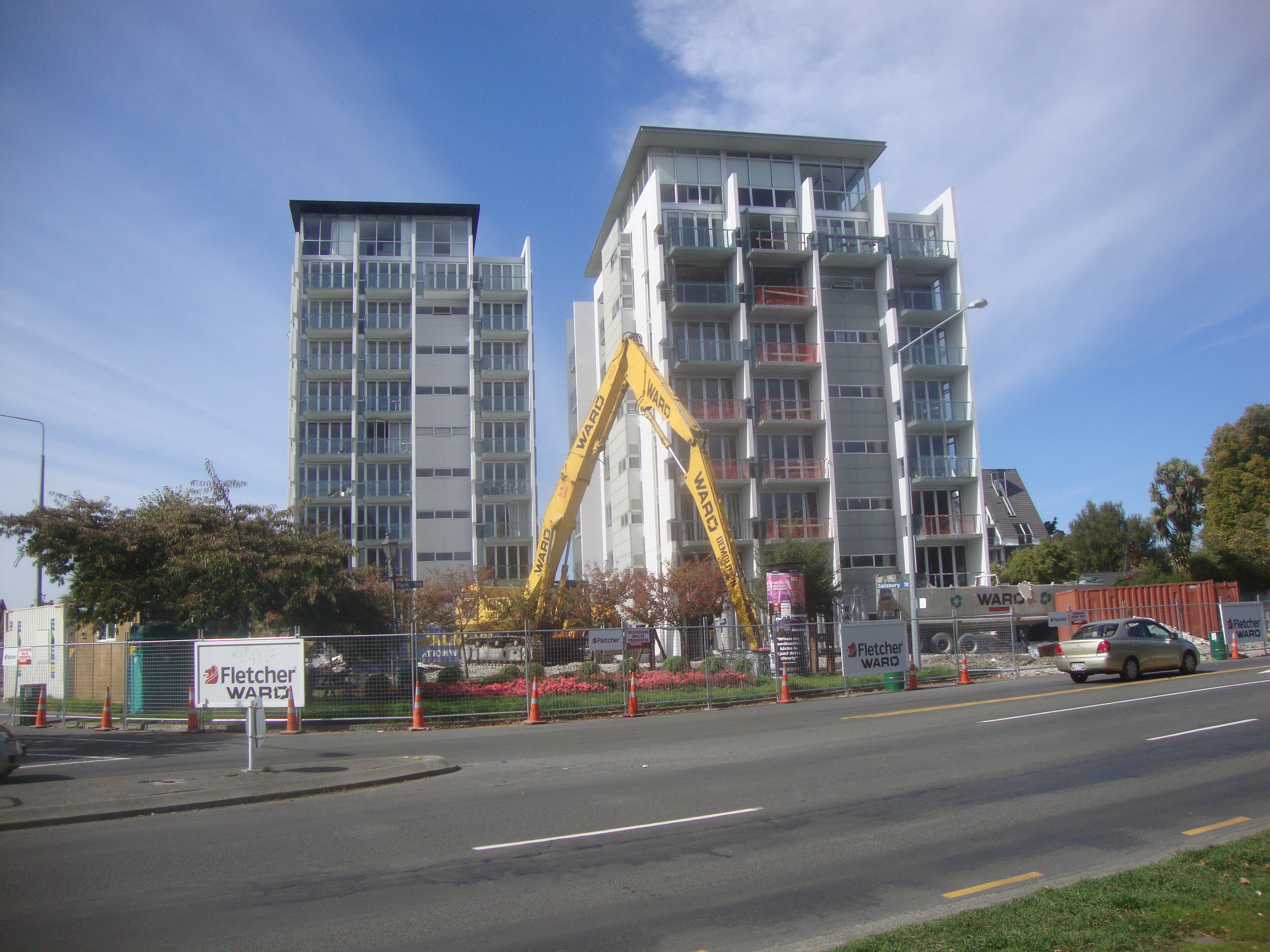
78 Park Terrace – start of demolition

Track cyclist Hayden Roulston had invested a six-figure sum with a New Zealand company that failed due to the 2008 financial crisis. Roulston confided in Adair that he was about to pull out of the preparations for the 2008 Summer Olympics, but Adair and four of his friends decided to provide finance for him during this difficult time. Roulston went to the Beijing Olympics and won a silver and a bronze medal in two of the track events. Adair and his wife lived at 78 Park Terrace and had a company that managed some of the apartment in the high rise complex. In 2009 and 2010, some of their business deals were audited by the Inland Revenue Department and reported by The Press, but the Adairs denied any wrongdoing. The apartment complex was demolished after suffering "critical structural damage" in the December 2011 Christchurch earthquake. Both he and his wife were awarded Christchurch Earthquake Awards by Christchurch City Council for their role in evacuating the high rise building after the February 2011 Christchurch earthquake.

In October 2014, Adair was declared bankrupt.
