= Doris Jones (archer) =

Canadian archer (born 1988)

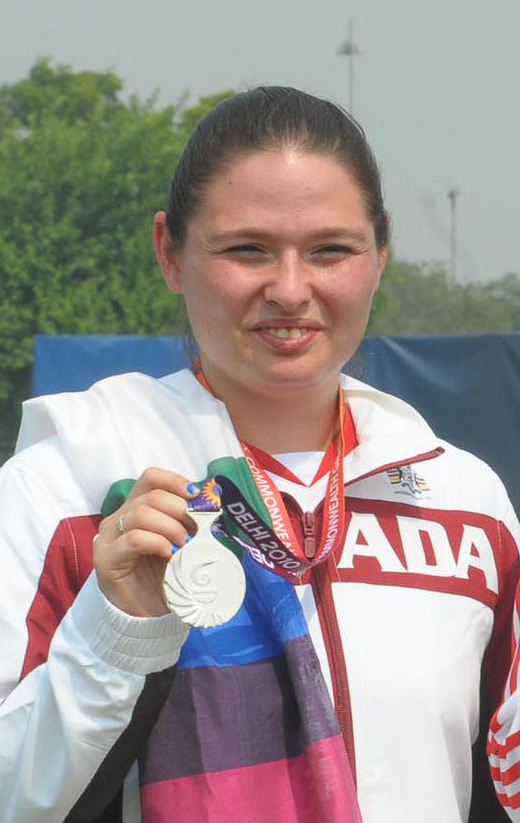
- Jones at 2010 Commonwealth Games

Personal information
- Full name: Doris Mary Jones
- Born: 15 November 1988 (age 37), Selkirk, Manitoba, Canada
- Occupation: Archer

Doris Mary Jones (born 15 November 1988) was the junior world compound bow archery champion in 2006. She is a Métis from Selkirk, Canada. Jones has been an archer since the age of four, competing all over the world, and is active with the Manitoba Metis Federation.

== Early life ==
As a teenager, she was involved in an automobile accident in Mexico days before the junior world championships. Although the thumb on her shooting hand broke during the accident and had to be held in a metal brace, she took it off for competition. Jones won the competition despite her injury, and had refused painkillers to avoid any positive drug tests.

== Achievements and awards ==
Jones won three world championships and set many Canadian and world records.

At the 2003 Canada Winter Games, she received gold. The games were held in Bathurst-Campbellton, New Brunswick. In 2004, she received the "Junior Female Athlete of the Year" award from the Canadian Archery Association (Archery Canada Tir à l'Arc). In 2006, she won the Tom Longboat Award as Canada's top Aboriginal female athlete. Jones took top honours at the World Archery Festival held in Las Vegas, winning gold in February 2006. As well, she won a gold medal at the world juniors in Mérida, Mexico in October of the same year.

Jones was a female finalist for the 2010 Manitoba Sportswriters and Sportscasters Association award.

In 2010, she won two Archery Silver Medals for Canada in the Commonwealth Games in Delhi, India. During her competition there, she played while having an inner ear infection.

Commonwealth Games Results (Women's Individual Compound Bow)

- Jones won in the quarterfinals, 6–0, against Janette Howells (WAL).
- She won in the semi-finals, 7–3, against Cassie McCall (AUS).
- Nicky Hunt (ENG) beat Jones 4–6 in the finals.

After the 2010 Commonwealth Games, due to a lack of funding, Jones could not continue her archery career. The cost of travel and no support or sponsorships made it difficult to continue in competitions.
