= Brett Austin =

New Zealand swimmer

Personal information
- Full name: Brett William Austin
- Nationality: New Zealand
- Born: 26 May 1959 Auckland, New Zealand
- Died: 9 December 1989 (aged 30)
- Height: 1.84 m (6 ft 0 in)
- Weight: 82 kg (181 lb)

Sport
- Sport: Swimming
- Strokes: Breaststroke

Brett William Austin (26 May 1959 – 9 December 1989) was a breaststroke swimmer who represented New Zealand at the 1984 Summer Olympics and the 1982 Commonwealth Games. He died in 1989.
