= Archery at the 1982 Commonwealth Games =

- Venue: Murarrie Recreation Reserve
- Dates: 2–5 October 1982
- Competitors: 36 from 15 nations

Archery at the 1982 Commonwealth Games was the debut appearance of Archery at the Commonwealth Games. The events were held in Brisbane, Australia, from 30 September to 9 October 1982.

The archery events were held at the Murarrie Recreation Reserve. There were two events, one for men and one for women, both using recurve bows.

England and New Zealand topped the archery medal table by virtue of winning one gold each. The final standings were decided by an aggregate score after four days of shooting. The women's champion, New Zealand's Neroli Fairhall, became the first paraplegic athlete to win a Commonwealth gold medal.

These games marked the debut of archery as a Commonwealth sport; however, it would not appear again until the 2010 Commonwealth Games in Delhi.

== Participating nations ==
36 archers from 15 nations participated at the 1982 Commonwealth Games.

- Australia (6)
- Canada (6)
- England (6)
- Guernsey (1)
- Hong Kong (1)
- Malta (1)
- New Zealand (2)
- Northern Ireland (4)
- Scotland (4)
- Wales (2)
- Zimbabwe (3)

== Medal summary ==
=== Medal table ===
Rank	Nation	Gold	Silver	Bronze	Total
1	England	1	0	0	1
1	New Zealand	1	0	0	1
3	Canada	0	1	1	2
4	Northern Ireland	0	1	0	1
5	Australia	0	0	1	1
Totals (5 entries)		2	2	2	6

=== Medallists ===
Event	Gold	Silver	Bronze
Men's	Mark Blenkarne (ENG)	Roger Lamay (CAN)	Michael Coen (AUS)
Women's	Neroli Fairhall (NZL)	Janet Yates (NIR)	Lucille Lemay (CAN)

== Results ==
=== Men's individual ===
Pos	Athlete	Pts
1	(England) Mark Blenkarne	2446
2	(Canada) Roger Lamay	2426
3	(Australia) Michael John Coen	2411
4	(England) Steven Hallard	2411
5	(Canada) Stan Siatkowski	2365
6	(Australia) Christopher Blake	2361
7	(Scotland) Brian Strachan	2339
8	(England) Peter Gillam	2335
9	(Canada) Ted Gamble	2331
10	(Australia) Geoffrey Lee Burnell-Jones	2329
11	(Zimbabwe) Lyle Heydenrych	2238
12	(Scotland) Christopher Elliott	2184
13	(Zimbabwe) David Milne	2120
14	(Northern Ireland) Eddie Graham	2115
15	(Wales) Tony Lewis	2104
16	(Guernsey) John Le Page	2024
17	(Hong Kong) Jimuel Lin	1906

=== Women's individual ===
Pos	Athlete	Score
1	(New Zealand) Neroli Fairhall	2373
2	(Northern Ireland) Janet Yates	2373
3	(Canada) Lucille Lemay	2349
4	(New Zealand) Anne Shurrock	2327
5	(Malta) Joanna Agius	2326
6	(Australia) Shirley Vera Chesshe	2317
7	(Australia) Terry Donovan	2310
8	(Canada) Linda Kazienko	2307
9	(Canada) Lucille Lessard	2307
10	(Wales) Marion Workman	2304
11	(England) Eileen Robinson	2292
12	(Scotland) Moira Taylor	2287
13	(Northern Ireland) Freda Britton	2274
14	(Australia) Marilyn Janet Rumley	2262
15	(England) Brenda Thomas	2258
16	(England) Charlotte Calladine	2229
17	(Northern Ireland) Angela Goodall	2167
18	(Zimbabwe) Doreen Milne	2004
19	(Scotland) Sarah Miles	1068
