= Matthews Kambale =

Malawian long-distance runner

Personal information
- Nationality: Malawian
- Born: 27 December 1952 (age 73)
- Height: 1.57 m (5 ft 2 in)
- Weight: 50 kg (110 lb)

Sport
- Sport: Long-distance running
- Events: 10,000 metres Marathon

Matthews Kambale (born 27 December 1952) is a Malawian former long-distance runner.

At the 1972 Summer Olympics in Munich, Matthews ran the men's marathon, finishing in 56th place with a time of 2:45:50. Kambale competed in both the 10,000 metres and the marathon at the 1984 Summer Olympics in Los Angeles: He finished twelfth in heat two of the 10,000 metres and so failed to qualify for the next round, and he did not complete the marathon.

He finished 26th in the 1982 Commonwealth Games marathon.
