= Athletics at the 1982 Commonwealth Games – Men's 5000 metres =

Men's 5000 metres at the Commonwealth Games

The men's 5000 metres event at the 1982 Commonwealth Games was held on 7 October at the QE II Stadium in Brisbane, Australia.

== Results ==
Rank	Name	Nationality	Time	Notes
1st place, gold medalist(s)	David Moorcroft	England	13:33.00	
2nd place, silver medalist(s)	Nick Rose	England	13:35.97	
3rd place, bronze medalist(s)	Peter Koech	Kenya	13:36.95	
4	Zacharia Barie	Tanzania	13:39.03	
5	Filippos Filippou	Cyprus	13:39.13	
6	Nat Muir	Scotland	13:40.84	
7	John Andrews	Australia	13:42.62	
8	Peter Renner	New Zealand	13:45.00	
9	Neil Lowsley	New Zealand	13:45.70	
10	Raj Kumar	India	13:46.40	
11	Roger Hackney	Wales	13:51.20	
12	Zephaniah Ncube	Zimbabwe	13:51.90	
13	Wilson Waigwa	Kenya	14:05.02	
14	Tim Hutchings	England	14:11.59	
15	Umar Mukhtar	Nigeria	14:43.73	
16	Bineshwar Prasad	Fiji	16:40.49	
	Robert de Castella	Australia	DNS	
	Peter Butler	Canada	DNS	
	Greg Duhaime	Canada	DNS	
	David Bonn	Cayman Islands	DNS	
	Marios Kassianidis	Cyprus	DNS	
	Shiri Chand	Fiji	DNS	
	Richard Kermode	Fiji	DNS	
	Erastus Kimei	Kenya	DNS	
	John Walker	New Zealand	DNS	
	Brian Yon	Saint Helena	DNS	
	Allister Hutton	Scotland	DNS	
	Steve Jones	Wales	DNS	
	Dennis Fowles	Wales	DNS	
