= Gail Jonson =

New Zealand swimmer

Personal information
- Nationality: New Zealand
- Born: 4 April 1965 (age 61) Hamilton, New Zealand

Sport
- Sport: Swimming
- Strokes: Medley, Butterfly
Medal record
Women's swimming
Representing New Zealand
Commonwealth Games
| Bronze medal – third place | 1982 Brisbane | 4x100m Freestyle Relay |

Gail Michelle Jonson (born 4 April 1965 in Hamilton, New Zealand) is a former medley and butterfly swimmer from New Zealand, who won a bronze medal in the women's 4 × 100 m freestyle relay at the 1982 Commonwealth Games. She also represented her native country at 1984 Summer Olympics.

== Swimming career ==
Racing at the 1982 Commonwealth Games in Brisbane, Jonson finished 5th in heat 2 of the 200 metre individual medley in a time of 5:10.06, four seconds ahead of her compatriot Kim Dewar. The following day, Johnson finished 3rd in heat 2 of the 200 metre individual medley in a time of 2:25.24 narrowly missing the final by 0.14, due in part to a slower backstroke to breaststroke turn. Jonson was part of the 4x100 metre freestyle relay team alongside Melanie Jones, Pamela Croad and Dewar that won the bronze medal in a time of 4:07.41, following the disqualification of both the 1st placed Australian and 2nd placed Canadian teams.The unaware team nearly missed the medal ceremony following a twenty minute delay to check the results and only made the ceremony after the car that was meant to take them back to the village had been delayed.

Johnson qualified for the Olympic games in the 400 metre individual medley when racing at the New Zealand Swimming Championships in Hamilton when she finished second to Australian Suzie Landells in a time of 4:57.18.

At the 1984 Summer Olympics in Los Angeles, Jonson finished 7th in the B final and 15th overall in the 400 metre individual medley in a time of 4:58.40, 19th overall in the 200 metre individual medley in a time of 2:25.00 and 19th overall in the 200 metre butterfly in a time of 2:20.55, one place ahead of her compatriot Anna Doig.

Jonson had retired by 1985.
