= Athletics at the 1982 Commonwealth Games – Men's discus throw =

Men's discus throw at the Commonwealth Games

The men's discus throw event at the 1982 Commonwealth Games was held on 8 October at the QE II Stadium in Brisbane, Australia.

== Results ==
Rank	Name	Nationality	#1	#2	#3	#4	#5	#6	Result	Notes
1st place, gold medalist(s)	Bradley Cooper	Bahamas				63.22	64.04		64.04	GR
2nd place, silver medalist(s)	Rob Gray	Canada							60.66	
3rd place, bronze medalist(s)	Bishop Dolegiewicz	Canada							60.34	
4	Richard Slaney	England							60.14	
5	Robert Weir	England							59.26	
6	Pete Tancred	England							58.82	
7	Richard Priman	Australia							54.30	
8	Robin Tait	New Zealand							54.22	
9	Christopher Pullen	Zimbabwe							51.60	
10	Stephen Chikomo	Zimbabwe							41.50	
	Mark Robinson	New Zealand							NM	
