= Mark Blenkarne =

British archer (born 1957)

Personal information
- Full name: Mark Adrian Blenkarne
- Born: 7 October 1957 (age 68) London, England
- Height: 183 cm (6 ft 0 in)
- Weight: 70 kg (154 lb)
Medal record
Gymnastics
Representing England
Commonwealth Games
Gold medal – first place	1982 Brisbane	individual

Mark Adrian Blenkarne (born 7 October 1957) is a male retired archer who competed for Great Britain and England.

== Early life ==
His father Tony worked for the British Insurance Association. He lived on Elmlea Avenue in Henbury.

He studied Law at Lanchester Polytechnic.

== Archery career ==
He competed with Dennis Savory from Cambridgeshire. Two of the four archers at Moscow, himself and Christine Harris, were at Cleve Archers at Cleve RFC.

Blenkarne represented Great Britain in the 1980 Summer Olympics. He represented England and won a gold medal in the men's individual event, at the 1982 Commonwealth Games in Brisbane, Queensland, Australia.
