= Mop and the Dropouts (Australian Band) =

Mop and the Dropouts were an Indigenous Australian rock band with a significant impact on the music scene and cultural activism. Formed by a teenage Dennis ‘Mop’ Conlon, who grew up in Cherbourg in the late 1960s. Conlon's musical journey began, playing alongside his uncle Doodie Bond and other uncles in band The Magpies, which was a precursor band that eventually evolved into the well-known Mop and the Dropouts. Conlon started the group to help promote "goodwill and understanding between Black and White cultures" through music.

== History ==
As a fourteen-year-old Dennis moved to Brisbane and started a new version of the Magpies (also known as Dennis Colon and the Magpies and Dennis Conlon and his band) that would play shows at Open Doors, an Aboriginal-run venue and South Brisbane venue, The Ship Inn.

In the late 1970s, the band occasional shows with punk bands, including Razar.

The band played many fundraiser shows for Black organisations. In the 80s the band would be performing twice a week or so, whether it would be around West End, Inala, Woodridge (Logan) Ipswich, Toowoomba.

== Music ==
The band are known for their iconic 1982 song ‘Brisbane Blacks’, that tells the story of the protests First Nations peoples undertook – marching for Aboriginal rights – during the time of the 12th Commonwealth Games in Brisbane.

== Legacy ==
The 2015 documentary Brisbane Blacks: The Story of Mop and the Dropouts (directed by Ben Carr) explores the band’s music and impact.

In 2022, Queensland Music Awards as a tribute to Mop and The Dropouts, with Conlon awarded a QMusic Lifetime Achievement Award.

QMusic offers the annual Dennis ‘Mop’ Conlon Scholarship named in Conlon’s honour for his enormous contribution to the Australian music industries, that provides opportunity to an emerging Indigenous Queensland musician or band to develop and record songs.

== Members ==
- Dennis ‘Mop’ Conlon
- Angus Rabbitt
- Charley "Teapot" Watson
- Keith "Jet" Jackson
- Robert 'Bimbo' Duncan - bass
- Robin O'Chin
- Richo "Jap" Conlon
- Ronald ‘Crow’ Conlon
- Hedley Johnson
- Billy ‘Yowie’ Gorham
- Kerry Jackson

== Discography ==
Title	Details
'Don't Give In' / 'Brisbane Blacks''	Released: 1982 (as Dennis Conlon and The Magpies); Format: 7"; Label Sundown Records
Man With A Vision	Released: 2005; Format: CD; Label: Independent
'Racial Discrimination' 'Mr Moonlight'	Released: 2011; Format: CD - Best of Koori Classic (The Early Years Aboriginal Collection) compilation
