= Athletics at the 1982 Commonwealth Games – Men's long jump =

Men's long jump at the Commonwealth Games

The men's long jump event at the 1982 Commonwealth Games was held on 7 October at the QE II Stadium in Brisbane, Australia.

== Results ==
Rank	Name	Nationality	#1	#2	#3	#4	#5	#6	Result	Notes
1st place, gold medalist(s)	Gary Honey	Australia		8.09	8.13				8.13	GR, AR
2nd place, silver medalist(s)	Steve Hanna	Bahamas							7.79	
3rd place, bronze medalist(s)	Stephen Walsh	New Zealand							7.75	
4	John Herbert	England							7.54	
5	Stephen Knott	Australia							7.53	
6	Moses Kiayi	Kenya							7.48	
7	Delroy Poyser	Jamaica							7.24	
8	Stalin Issah	Ghana							7.03	
9	Norbet Elliot	Bahamas							6.47	
	Dave Steen	Canada							DNS	
	Daley Thompson	England							DNS	
