= John Hastie (sport shooter) =

New Zealand sport shooter (1938–2021)

Personal information
- Born: 19 March 1938 Hastings, New Zealand
- Died: 4 October 2021 (aged 83) Wellington, New Zealand

Sport
- Country: New Zealand
- Sport: Shooting
- Club: Okawa Rifle Club; Hawke's Bay Rifle Club

Achievements and titles
- National finals: Ballinger Belt winner (1982)

John Hastie (19 March 1938 – 4 October 2021) was a New Zealand shooter and gunsmith. He competed at two Commonwealth Games, and won the Ballinger Belt in 1982.

== Biography ==
Born in Hastings on 19 March 1938, Hastie grew up shooting rabbits on a Hawke's Bay sheep station. In 1966, he began long-range target shooting at the Okawa Rifle Club, where he was mentored by Maurie Gordon.

Hastie competed for New Zealand in full-bore rifle shooting at the 1978 and 1982 Commonwealth Games. On both occasions he finished 19th in the open full-bore individual events, and in 1982 he was sixth, with John Whiteman, in the open full-bore pairs. Hastie was New Zealand shooting team manager at both the 1990 and 1994 Commonwealth Games.

In 1982, Hastie won the Ballinger Belt at the New Zealand rifle shooting championships, representing the Okawa Rifle Club.

Between 1976 and 2007, Hastie was a member of many New Zealand teams at the Palma Match team events and world long-range championships, either a shooter, coach or gunsmith. With Tony Halberg, he built the rifles that the New Zealand team used to place third at the 1999 world championship at Bloemfontein.

Hastie was a life member of the Hawke's Bay Rifle Club and the National Rifle Association of New Zealand. He died in Wellington on 4 October 2021.
