= Roger Sumich =

New Zealand cyclist (born 1955)

Personal information
- Born: 12 November 1955 (age 70) Whenuapai, New Zealand

Cycling career
- Sport: Cycling
Medal record
Men's cycling
Representing New Zealand
Commonwealth Games
Bronze medal – third place	1982 Brisbane	Individual Road Race

Roger John Leonard Sumich (born 12 November 1955) is a New Zealand retired cyclist. He represented his native country at the 1984 Summer Olympics. There he did not finish in the individual road race. Sumich won the bronze medal in the same event at the 1982 Commonwealth Games in Brisbane, Australia.

Sumich won and set the fastest time in the amateur Goulburn to Sydney Classic in 1983 run from Goulburn to Liverpool.
