= Robin Tait =

New Zealand discus thrower

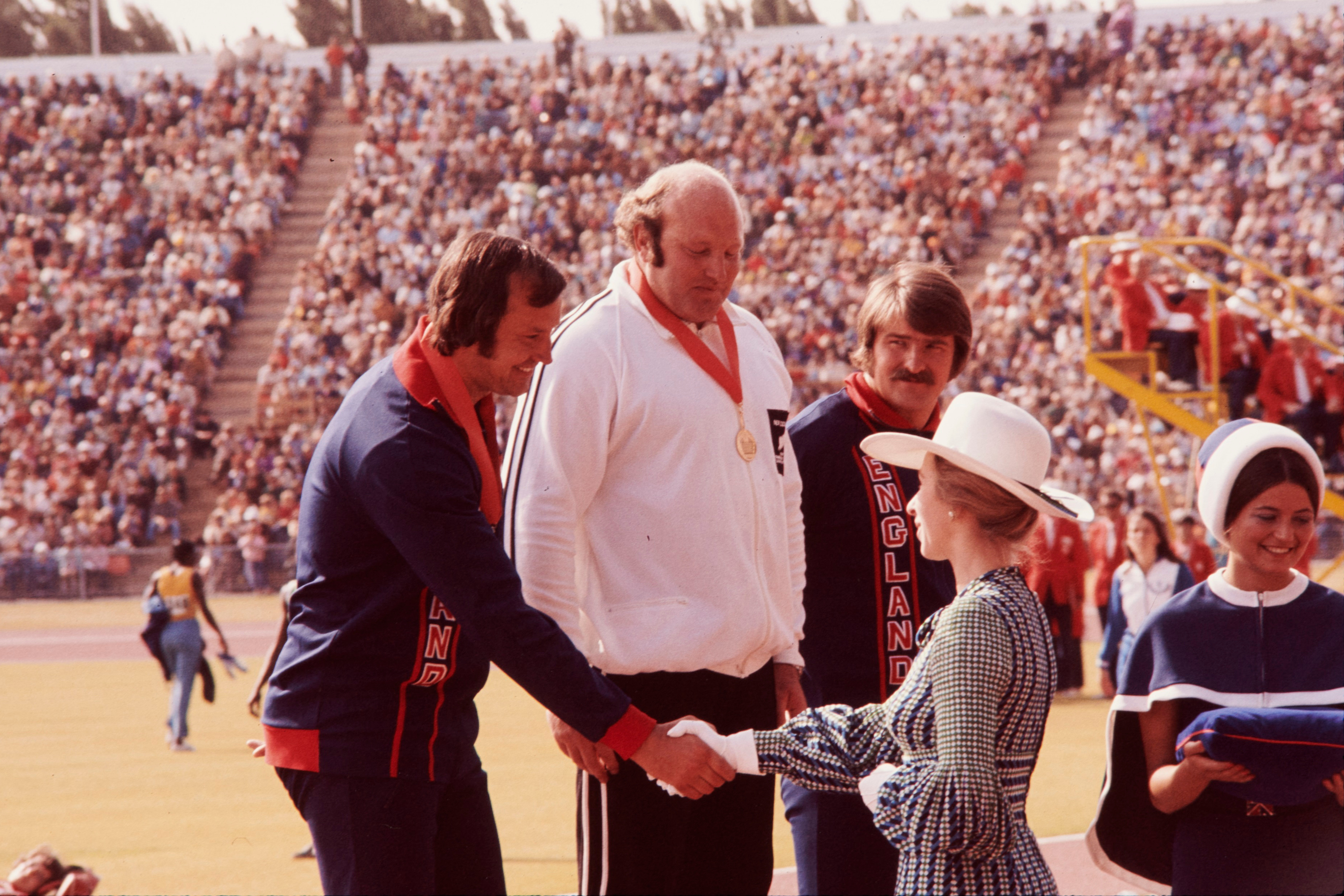
- Gold medal ceremony at 1974 Commonwealth Games. Presented by Princess Anne

Personal information
- Full name: Robin Douglas Tait
- Born: 14 April 1940 Dunedin, Otago
- Died: 20 March 1984 (aged 43) Auckland
Medal record
Men's Athletics
Representing New Zealand
Commonwealth Games
Gold medal – first place	1974 Christchurch	Discus Throw
Bronze medal – third place	1966 Kingston	Discus Throw

Robin Douglas Tait (14 April 1940 in Dunedin, Otago – 20 March 1984 in Auckland) was a discus thrower representing New Zealand at two Summer Olympics: 1968 and 1972.

He represented New Zealand at six Commonwealth Games: 1962, 1966, 1970, 1974, 1978 and 1982.

He won the gold medal at the 1974 British Commonwealth Games in the men's discus throw event and the bronze in the same event in 1966. Tait carried the New Zealand flag at the opening ceremony of the 1982 Commonwealth Games in Brisbane, Queensland, Australia.
