= Stephen Walsh (athlete) =

New Zealand long jumper

Steve Walsh
Personal information
- Full name: Stephen Craig Walsh
- Born: 17 December 1960 (age 65) Dunedin, New Zealand
- Height: 1.84 m (6 ft 0 in)
- Weight: 72 kg (159 lb)
- Spouse: Vivien Binney (m. 1993)

Sport
- Country: New Zealand
- Sport: Track and field
- Event: Long jump

Achievements and titles
- National finals: Long jump champion (1980, 1981, 1982, 1983, 1984, 1985, 1986)
Medal record
Men's Athletics
Representing New Zealand
Commonwealth Games
Bronze medal – third place	1982 Brisbane	Long jump

Stephen Craig Walsh (born 17 December 1960) is a retired male long jumper from New Zealand. He competed in the 1982 Commonwealth Games winning bronze, and in 1984 Summer Olympic Games. He won the New Zealand national men's long jump title in seven consecutive years, from 1980 to 1986.

Walsh was born in Dunedin on 17 December 1960, and educated at Otago Boys' High School. He went on to study at Auckland Technical Institute from 1981 to 1983, gaining a Diploma of Physiotherapy, and the University of Otago from 1987 to 1991, graduating MB ChB. Between 1984 and 1986, he worked as a physiotherapist at Dunedin Hospital, and after completing his medical studies he worked in general practice. In 1993, Walsh married Vivien Binney.
