= Athletics at the 1982 Commonwealth Games – Men's javelin throw =

International athletics championship event

Men's javelin throw at the Commonwealth Games

The men's javelin throw event at the 1982 Commonwealth Games was held on 9 October at the QE II Stadium in Brisbane, Australia. It was the last time that the old model javelin was used at the Games.

== Results ==
Rank	Name	Nationality	#1	#2	#3	#4	#5	#6	Result	Notes
1st place, gold medalist(s)	Mike O'Rourke	New Zealand					89.48		89.48	GR
2nd place, silver medalist(s)	Laslo Babits	Canada							84.88	
3rd place, bronze medalist(s)	Zakayo Malekwa	Tanzania			80.22				80.22	
4	Phil Olsen	Canada							77.96	
5	William Sang	Kenya							77.64	
6	Peter Yates	England							77.40	
7	David Ottley	England							75.00	
8	David Hookway	New Zealand							69.72	
9	George Odera	Kenya							65.56	
10	Cornelius Kemboi	Kenya							62.88	
11	Ritchie Okesene	Western Samoa							55.96	
12	Jioji Tadulala	Fiji							53.06	
	Justin Arop	Uganda							NM	
