= Michael Gilchrist =

New Zealand middle-distance runner

Michael Gilchrist (born 9 August 1960) is a New Zealand former athlete who competed mainly in middle-distance running. He competed at the 1982 Commonwealth Games and the 1986 Commonwealth Games.

== Biography ==
At the 1982 Commonwealth Games Gilchrist finished seventh in the final of the 1500m and at the 1986 Commonwealth Games he was sixth in the 3000m steeplechase and did not qualify for the final of the 1500m.
