= Athletics at the 1982 Commonwealth Games – Men's marathon =

Men's marathon at the Commonwealth Games

The men's marathon event was held on 8 October 1982. It started and finished at South Brisbane, next to the Brisbane River in Stanley Street.Brisbane, Australia.

Two of the Tanzanians, Juma Ikangaa and reigning champion Gidamis Shahanga, opened up a large lead (58 seconds at the 30 km mark), but Rob de Castella closed the gap in the final kilometres to win.

== Results ==
Rank	Name	Nationality	Time	Notes
1st place, gold medalist(s)	Robert de Castella	Australia	2:09:18	
2nd place, silver medalist(s)	Juma Ikangaa	Tanzania	2:09:30	
3rd place, bronze medalist(s)	Mike Gratton	England	2:12:06	
4	John Graham	Scotland	2:13:04	
5	Kevin Ryan	New Zealand	2:13:42	
6	Gidamis Shahanga	Tanzania	2:14:25	
7	Graham Laing	Scotland	2:14:54	
8	Ian Ray	England	2:15:11	
9	Mike Dyon	Canada	2:15:22	
10	Robert Wallace	Australia	2:15:24	
11	Raymond Smedley	England	2:15:50	
12	Samuel Hlawe	Swaziland	2:16:32	
13	Dennis Fowles	Wales	2:16:49	
14	Greg Hannon	Northern Ireland	2:17:32	
15	Peter Butler	Canada	2:18:17	
16	Sipho Gamedze	Swaziland	2:18:44	
17	Emmanuel Ndiemandoi	Tanzania	2:19:16	
18	Marios Kassianidis	Cyprus	2:19:51	
19	Sammy Mogere	Kenya	2:21:44	
20	Wilson Theleso	Botswana	2:23:10	
21	Esau Zwane	Swaziland	2:26:38	
22	Motsemme Kgaotsang	Botswana	2:27:39	
23	Musaope Phiri	Zimbabwe	2:28:27	
24	James Maweu	Kenya	2:29:15	
25	Esau Magwaza	Zimbabwe	2:30:34	
26	Matthews Kambale	Malawi	2:33:34	
27	Mackay Talasasa	Solomon Islands	2:36:16	
28	Abel Manumanua	Papua New Guinea	2:42:07	
29	Nicholas Akers	Cayman Islands	3:02:33	
	Lawrence Whitty	Australia	DNF	
	Shiri Chand	Fiji	DNF	
	Wayne Madden	Fiji	DNF	
	Gary Palmer	New Zealand	DNF	
	Donald Greig	New Zealand	DNF	
	Tau Tokwepota	Papua New Guinea	DNF	
	David Bonn	Cayman Islands	DNS	
	Bineshwar Prasad	Fiji	DNS	
	Nada Meta	Tanzania	DNS	
	Steve Jones	Wales	DNS	
