= Athletics at the 1982 Commonwealth Games – Women's long jump =

Women's long jump at the Commonwealth Games

The women's long jump event at the 1982 Commonwealth Games was held on 7 and 8 October at the QE II Stadium in Brisbane, Australia.

== Medalists ==
Gold	Silver	Bronze
Shonel Ferguson; Bahamas	Robyn Lorraway; Australia	Beverly Kinch; England

== Results ==
=== Qualification ===
Rank	Name	Nationality	Result	Notes
?	Robyn Lorraway	Australia	6.58	q
?	Linda Garden	Australia	6.56	q
?	Glynis Nunn	Australia	6.35	q
?	Alapurackal Mathews	India	6.23	q
?	Karen Nelson	Canada	6.22	q
13	Kim Morgan	Zimbabwe	5.66	
14	Marie-Lourdes Allysamba	Mauritius	5.35	
15	Geraldine Shitandayi	Kenya	4.93	
	Jill Ross	Canada	DNS	
	Sharon McPeake	Northern Ireland	DNS	

=== Final ===
Rank	Name	Nationality	#1	#2	#3	#4	#5	#6	Result	Notes
1st place, gold medalist(s)	Shonel Ferguson	Bahamas	6.91w						6.91w	
2nd place, silver medalist(s)	Robyn Lorraway	Australia							6.88w	
3rd place, bronze medalist(s)	Beverly Kinch	England							6.78	
4	Linda Garden	Australia							6.53w	
5	Sue Hearnshaw	England							6.50	
6	Maria Teloni-Lambrou	Cyprus							6.38	
7	Glynis Nunn	Australia							6.38w	
8	Pamela Hendren	New Zealand							6.33	
9	Noeline Hodgins	New Zealand							6.27	
10	Gillian Regan	Wales							6.16	
	Alapurackal Mathews	India							DNS	
	Karen Nelson	Canada							DNS	
