= Neroli Fairhall =

New zealand paralympic archer

Neroli Fairhall MBE

Personal information
- Born: Neroli Susan Fairhall; 26 August 1944 Christchurch, New Zealand
- Died: 11 June 2006 (aged 61) Christchurch, New Zealand

Sport
- Country: New Zealand
- Sport: Archery
Medal record
Women's archery
Representing New Zealand
Commonwealth Games
Gold medal – first place	1982 Brisbane	FITA Double
Paralympic Games
Gold medal – first place	1980 Arnhem	FITA Round

Neroli Susan Fairhall MBE (26 August 1944 – 11 June 2006) was a New Zealand athlete, who was the first paraplegic competitor in the Olympic Games.

== Biography ==
Born in Christchurch in 1944, Fairhall took up archery following a motorbike accident that paralysed her from the waist down, ending her previous athletic career.

Fairhall won gold when archery was first introduced to the Commonwealth Games in Brisbane in 1982.

She finished in 35th place at the 1984 Los Angeles Olympic Games. Fairhall was the first paraplegic to compete in the Olympic Games.

Fairhall was a multiple national champion and won medals and held titles at the Paralympics, IPC-Archery World Championships and many international tournaments. She participated in four Summer Paralympics, in 1972, 1980, 1988, and 2000. At her first Paralympic Games she competed in track and field athletics. At the 1980 Games, she took part in both athletics and archery, winning a gold medal in the latter sport. At the 1988 and 2000 Paralympics she competed in archery only.

In the 1983 New Year Honours, Fairhall was appointed a Member of the Order of the British Empire, for services to archery and the disabled. She continued to coach at her Christchurch archery club after retiring from shooting. She died in Christchurch on 11 June 2006, aged 61, due to illness arising from her disability. In 2024, she was posthumously awarded the Paralympics New Zealand (PNZ) Order of Merit for her outstanding service to PNZ and Paralympic sport in New Zealand.

== See also ==
- List of athletes who have competed in the Paralympics and Olympics

Awards
Preceded by David Barnes and Hamish Willcox	Lonsdale Cup of the New Zealand Olympic Committee; 1982	Succeeded by David Barnes and Hamish Willcox
