= Athletics at the 1982 Commonwealth Games – Men's 3000 metres steeplechase =

Men's 3000 metres steeplechase at the Commonwealth Games

The men's 3000 metres steeplechase event at the 1982 Commonwealth Games was held on 4 October at the QE II Stadium in Brisbane, Australia.

== Results ==
Rank	Name	Nationality	Time	Notes
1st place, gold medalist(s)	Julius Korir	Kenya	8:23.94	
2nd place, silver medalist(s)	Graeme Fell	England	8:26.64	
3rd place, bronze medalist(s)	Greg Duhaime	Canada	8:29.14	
4	Roger Hackney	Wales	8:32.84	
5	Peter Renner	New Zealand	8:34.32	
6	Filippos Filippou	Cyprus	8:35.23	
7	Amos Korir	Kenya	8:38:48	
8	Colin Reitz	England	8:41:94	
9	Peter Larkins	Australia	8:42:68	
10	Richard Tuwei	Kenya	8:45:98	
11	Neil Lowsley	New Zealand	8:47.23	
12	Paul Davies-Hale	England	8:50.73	
