= Tony Rogers (athlete) =

New Zealand middle-distance runner (born 1957)

Tony Rogers (born 30 April 1957, in Huntly) is a retired middle-distance runner from New Zealand, who represented his native country in the men's 1,500 metres at the 1984 Summer Olympics, finishing in ninth place. He also competed at the 1982 Commonwealth Games, and later became High Performance Manager for Athletics New Zealand.
