= Mike Davidson (swimmer) =

New Zealand swimmer (born 1963)

Personal information
- Full name: Michael James Davidson
- Born: July 20, 1963 (age 62) Whangarei, Northland, New Zealand
- Height: 180 cm (5 ft 11 in)
- Weight: 73 kg (161 lb)
- Spouse: Jennifer Brothers

Sport
- Sport: Swimming
- Strokes: freestyle
- College team: University of Alabama
- Coach: Don Gambril (Alabama)
Medal record
Men's Swimming
Representing New Zealand
Commonwealth Games
Bronze medal – third place	1986 Edinburgh	400 m Freestyle

Michael James Davidson (born 20 July 1963 in Whangārei) is a former freestyle swimmer from New Zealand, who swam for the University of Alabama and won the bronze medal in the men's 400 metres freestyle at the 1986 Commonwealth Games. He represented his native country in three swimming events at the 1984 Summer Olympics in Los Angeles.

== 1984 Olympics ==
Before joining the University of Alabama, Davidson swam for his native New Zealand at the 1984 Olympics in Los Angeles where he posted top-16 finishes in the 400 and 1500-metre freestyles. He finished 14th in the 1500 meters, 16th in the 400 meters and 35th in the 200 meters.

== University of Alabama ==
A distance ace and team captain for the University of Alabama during the late 1980s, Davidson earned All-American honors in the mile and helped lead Alabama to the 1987 Southeastern Conference team title under the direction of legendary UA coach Don Gambril.

Davidson earned a bronze medal at the 1986 Commonwealth Games. He was inducted into New Zealand's Northland Sports Legends Hall of Fame in 2011.

Davidson is married to Jennifer Brothers, who was also an Alabama All-American swimmer, and was part of the women's 1985 SEC championship team. Jennifer, who is also a swimming coach, has coached the New Zealand National team.

== Coaching ==
He served as head swim coach of High Tide Aquatics Club in Gainesville, Florida for five years and was announced as an assistant coach at the University of Alabama in June 2012. Davidson also served as head coach of Sub-4 Swimming and as a New Zealand national team coach.

In July, 2014, he accepted a position as Program Director and Head Coach for the Birmingham Swim League.

== See also ==
- List of Commonwealth Games medallists in swimming (men)
