= Anthony Cuff =

New Zealander cyclist (born 1957)

Personal information
- Born: 26 December 1957 (age 68) Palmerston North, New Zealand

Cycling career
- Sport: Cycling

Anthony James Cuff (born 26 December 1957) is a New Zealand former cyclist. He won the Tour of Southland in 1980. He competed in the individual pursuit and team pursuit events at the 1984 Summer Olympics.

Awards
| Preceded by Ian Ferguson | Lonsdale Cup of the New Zealand Olympic Committee; 1980 | Succeeded by David Barnes and Hamish Willcox |
