= Stephen Cox (cyclist) =

New Zealand cyclist (born 1956)

Stephen Cox ONZM
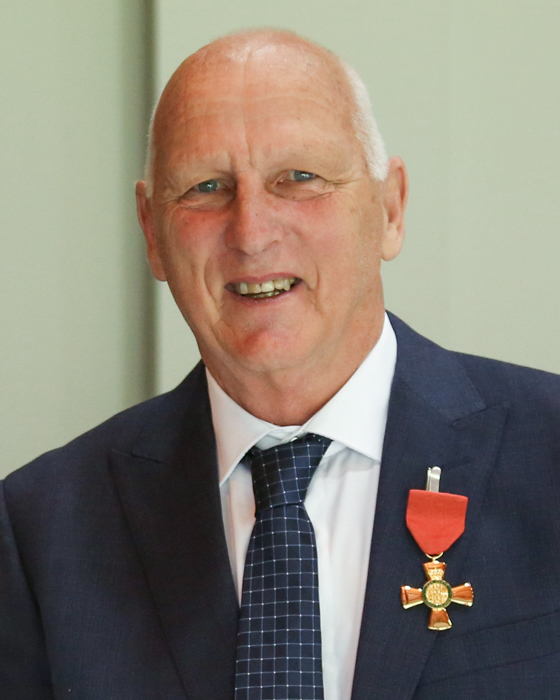
- Cox in 2024

Personal information
- Full name: Stephen Clifford Cox
- Born: 6 January 1956 (age 70) Whanganui, New Zealand

Cycling career
- Sport: Cycling

Stephen Clifford Cox ONZM (born 6 January 1956) is a retired racing cyclist from New Zealand, who represented his native country at the 1984 Summer Olympics. There he finished in 37th place in the men's individual road race. Cox won the bronze medal at the 1982 Commonwealth Games in Brisbane, Australia.

In the 2024 King's Birthday Honours, Cox was appointed an Officer of the New Zealand Order of Merit, for services to cycling.

== Major accomplishments ==
1978

- 1st Overall Tour of North

1979

- 1st Overall Dulux

1980

- 1st Overall Tour of North

1981

- 1st Overall Tour of Waikato
- 1st Overall Tour of Southland

1982

- 1st Graften to Inverell Classic
- 1st Overall Tour of Southland
- 3rd Commonwealth Games 100K TTT, Brisbane, Australia

1983

- 1st Overall Tour of Waikato
- 2nd Overall Tour of Southland

1984

- 1st Overall Tour of North
- 1st Overall Tour of Wellington
