= Lorraine Moller =

New Zealand distance runner

Lorraine Moller ONZM MBE
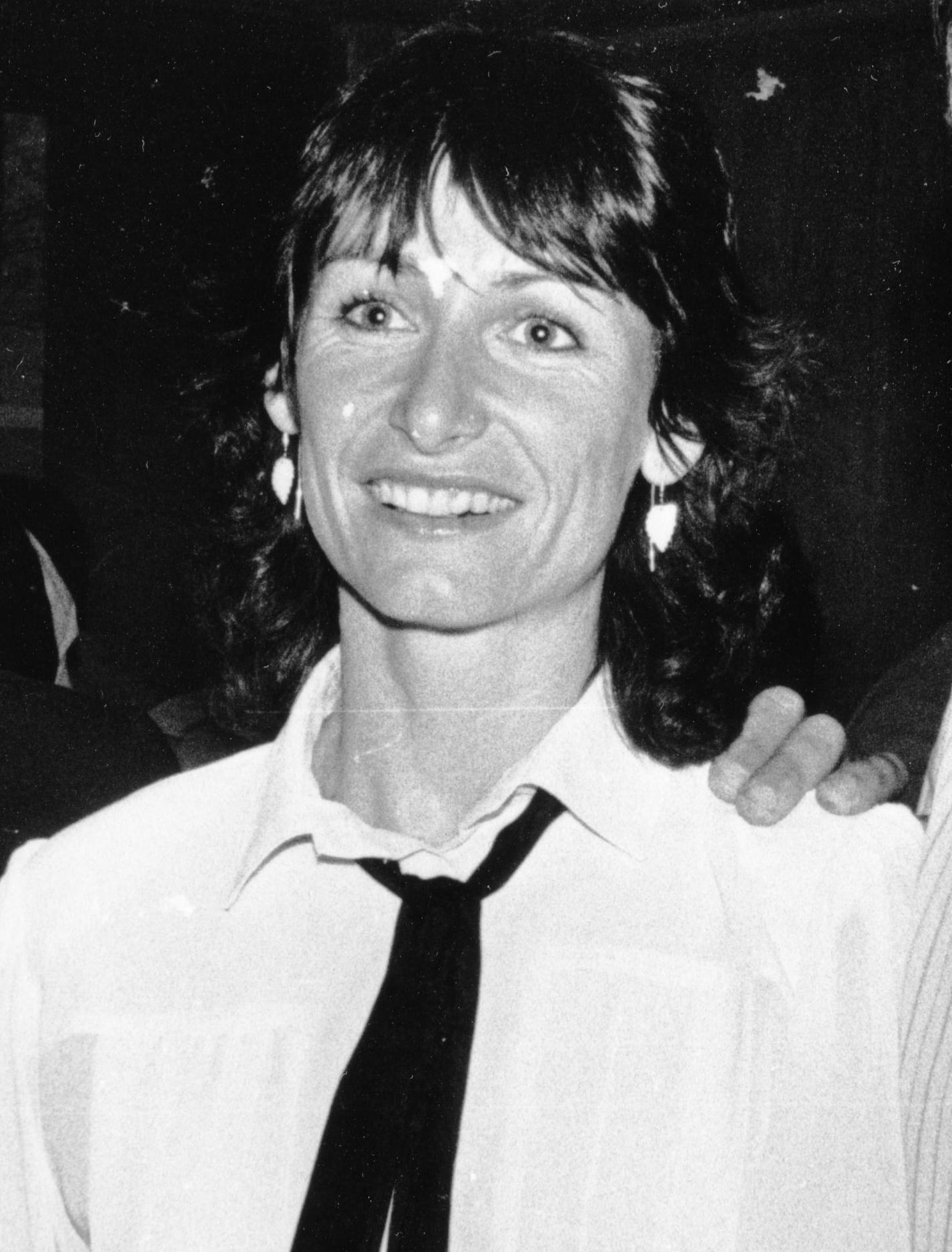
- Moller in 1984

Personal information
- Born: 1 June 1955 (age 71) Putāruru, New Zealand

Sport
- Coached by: John Davies
Medal record
Women's athletics
Representing New Zealand
Olympic Games
Bronze medal – third place	1992 Barcelona	Marathon
Commonwealth Games
Silver medal – second place	1986 Edinburgh	Marathon
Bronze medal – third place	1982 Brisbane	1500 m
Bronze medal – third place	1982 Brisbane	3000 m

Lorraine Mary Moller ONZM MBE (born 1 June 1955) is a former athlete from New Zealand, who competed in track athletics and later specialised in the marathon. Moller's international career lasted over 20 years and included winning a silver medal in the marathon at the 1986 Commonwealth Games in Edinburgh and a bronze medal in the marathon at the 1992 Olympic Games in Barcelona at the age of 37. A four-time Olympian, she also completed the marathon at the 1984, 1988 and 1996 games. Her other marathon victories included the 1984 Boston Marathon and being a three-time winner (1986, 1987, 1989) of the Osaka International Ladies Marathon.

== Early life ==
Moller was born in Putāruru on 1 June 1955. She studied physical education at the University of Otago from 1973 to 1975, and subsequently worked as a teacher in the Bay of Plenty for two years.

== Track career ==
Moller's first international competition was the 1974 British Commonwealth Games at Christchurch, where she finished fifth in the 800 m. Her time of 2:03.63 was her lifetime best and is still the fastest ever by a New Zealand junior (under 20) woman.

Although Moller ran her first marathon in 1979, there were no sanctioned marathons for females at an international athletics competition until 1984. Moller was instead selected for both the 1500 m and 3000 m at the 1982 Commonwealth Games in Brisbane, winning bronze medals for both events.

In 1985 Moller broke the New Zealand 1500 m record, running 4:10.35 at Brussels. In 1986 at the Commonwealth Games, as well as the marathon (see below), she competed in the 3000 m, finishing fifth.

As of June 2008, Moller ranked in the all-time top ten in New Zealand for the 1500 m, mile, 3000 m and 5000 m. She also ranked 11th for the 10,000 m.

== Personal bests ==
Event	Time	Date	Place
800 m	2:03.63	1974	Christchurch
1500 m	4:10.35	1985	Brussels
Mile	4:32.97	1985	
3000 m	8:51.78	1983	
5000 m	15:35.75	1985	
10000 m	32:40.17	1988	
Marathon	2:28:17	1986	Edinburgh

== Marathon career ==
Moller ran her first marathon on 23 June 1979, winning Grandma's Marathon in Duluth, Minnesota in 2:37:37. The time was the fastest ever by a New Zealander and the sixth-fastest ever run by a woman. She then won her next 7 marathons.

She was a triple winner of the Osaka Ladies Marathon, and in 1984 won the Boston Marathon.

All of Moller's appearances at the Olympic Games were in the marathon. Her full records are:

- 1984: 5th (2:28:34)
- 1988: 33rd (2:37:52)
- 1992: 3rd (2:33:59)
- 1996: 46th (2:42:21)

She also won the silver medal at the 1986 Commonwealth Games in Edinburgh, running 2:28:17, her lifetime best.

In 2012 she was inducted into the Boulder (Colorado) Sports Hall of Fame. She has worked with the Lydiard Foundation and the Master Plan training system to share the lessons of running coach Arthur Lydiard.

== Achievements ==
Year	Competition	Venue	Position	Event	Notes
Representing New Zealand
1974	Commonwealth Games	Christchurch, New Zealand	5th	800 m	2:03.63
1979	Grandma's Marathon	Duluth, United States	1st	Marathon	2:37:37
1980	Grandma's Marathon	Duluth, United States	1st	Marathon	2:38:35
1981	Grandma's Marathon	Duluth, United States	1st	Marathon	2:29:35
1982	Commonwealth Games	Brisbane, Australia	3rd	1500 m	4:12.67
1982	Commonwealth Games	Brisbane, Australia	3rd	3000 m	8:55.76
1982	London Marathon	London, England	2nd	Marathon	2:36:15
1984	Boston Marathon	Boston, United States	1st	Marathon	2:29:28
1984	Olympic Games	Los Angeles, United States	5th	Marathon	2:28:54
1986	Osaka Ladies Marathon	Osaka, Japan	1st	Marathon	2:30:24
1986	Commonwealth Games	Edinburgh, Scotland	5th	3000 m	9:03.89
1986	Commonwealth Games	Edinburgh, Scotland	2nd	Marathon	2:28:17
1987	Osaka Ladies Marathon	Osaka, Japan	1st	Marathon	2:30:40
1987	World Championships	Rome, Italy	21st	10,000 m	34:07.26
1988	Olympic Games	Seoul, South Korea	33rd	Marathon	2:37:52
1989	Osaka Ladies Marathon	Osaka, Japan	1st	Marathon	2:30:21
1989	Hokkaido Marathon	Sapporo, Japan	1st	Marathon	2:36:39
1991	Hokkaido Marathon	Sapporo, Japan	1st	Marathon	2:33:20
1992	Olympic Games	Barcelona, Spain	3rd	Marathon	2:33:59
1996	Olympic Games	Atlanta, United States	46th	Marathon	2:42:21

== Honours and awards ==
In 1990, Moller was awarded the New Zealand 1990 Commemoration Medal. In the 1993 New Year Honours, she was appointed a Member of the Order of the British Empire, for services to athletics. In the 2026 New Year Honours, Moller was appointed an Officer of the New Zealand Order of Merit, for services to athletics.

Moller was inducted into the University of Otago School of Physical Education's wall of fame.

== Personal life ==
Moller moved to Boulder, Colorado in 1982. She was married to fellow Olympian Ron Daws whom she later divorced. She then married Harlan Smith and they have one daughter.

== Author ==
- Moller, Lorraine. On the Wings of Mercury: The Lorraine Moller Story. 2007. Longacre Press. ISBN 978-1-877361-99-9.

== Audio interviews ==
- TheFinalSprint.com's Podcast Interview: "Lorraine Moller: Female running pioneer and Lydiard protégé: "Part 1" and "Part 2"
- Interview at ''flotrack''
