= Dianne Zorn =

New Zealand athlete

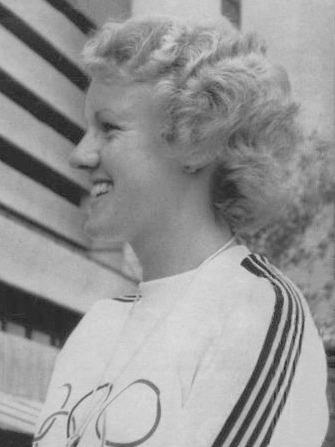
- Zorn at the 1976 Olympics

Personal information
- Born: 9 November 1956 (age 69) Napier, New Zealand
- Height: 170 cm (5 ft 7 in)
- Weight: 62 kg (137 lb)

Sport
- Sport: Athletics
- Events: 1500 m, 3000 m
- Club: Hawkes Bay

Achievements and titles
- Personal bests: 1500 m – 4:11.48 (1981); 3000 m – 8:47.90 (1984)

Dianne Margaret Zorn-Rodger (born 9 November 1956 in Napier, New Zealand) is a New Zealand retired middle-distance runner. She competed in the 1500m at the 1976 Summer Olympics and in the 3000 m at the 1984 Summer Olympics and placed ninth in 1984. She married the New Zealand rower Dave Rodger. In 1984, they became the first New Zealand married couple to compete at Olympics.

After the 1976 Olympics, she had long breaks from major competitions due to multiple injuries. She recovered by 1982, and that year placed fourth in the 1500m and 3000m events at the Commonwealth Games and finished fifth at the World Athletics Cross Country Championships.

Zorn graduated from the William Colenso College in Napier, and already at the age 13 qualified for the national cross-country running championships. After marriage, she moved to Hamilton, and often competed in the marathon and cross-country races in the United States. She retired after suffering a stress fracture in 1988, and later gave birth to a daughter Aynslee (b. 1989) and sons Logan (b. 1992) and Brenton (b. 1997). Logan competed internationally for New Zealand in rowing, and Aynslee played American football and Australian rules football for New South Wales.
