= Blair Stockwell =

New Zealand cyclist (born 1949)

Blair Stockwell MBE
Personal information
- Full name: Blair Goldesbrough Stockwell
- Born: 17 December 1949 (age 76) Christchurch, New Zealand
- Height: 1.74 m (5 ft 9 in)

Sport
- Country: New Zealand
- Sport: Cycling
Medal record
Men's cycling
Representing New Zealand
British Commonwealth Games
Bronze medal – third place	1970 Edinburgh	Individual Pursuit
Bronze medal – third place	1974 Christchurch	Team Pursuit
Bronze medal – third place	1978 Edmonton	Team Time Trial

Blair Goldesbrough Stockwell MBE (born 17 December 1949) is a former racing cyclist & business owner from New Zealand. He won three bronze medals representing New Zealand at the Commonwealth Games.

== Cycling career ==
At the 1970 British Commonwealth Games he won the bronze medal in the men's individual pursuit over 4000 m. Four years later at the 1974 British Commonwealth Games in Christchurch he won a bronze riding as part of the team pursuit. At the following Games in Edmonton 1978 he came 30th in the men's road race. Stockwell won his third bronze at the 1982 Brisbane Games in the men's team time trial. He competed at the 1972 Summer Olympics in the men's team pursuit finishing in 14th position.

Stockwell (1972, 1980 and 1984) and Jack Swart are the only cyclists to have won the Dulux North Island Tour three times.

In the 1982 Queen's Birthday Honours, Stockwell was appointed a Member of the Order of the British Empire, for services to cycling.
