= 1982 Commonwealth Games =

Multi-sport event in Brisbane, Australia

Coordinates: 27°33′30″S 153°3′44″E

XII Commonwealth Games
- Host city: Brisbane, Australia
- Motto: The Friendly Games
- Nations: 46
- Athletes: 1,583
- Events: 141 events in 12 sports
- Opening: 30 September 1982
- Closing: 9 October 1982
- Opened by: Prince Philip, Duke of Edinburgh
- Athlete's Oath: Tracey Wickham
- Queen's Baton Final Runner: Raelene Boyle
- Main venue: QEII Stadium

The 1982 Commonwealth Games were held in Brisbane, Australia, from 30 September to 9 October 1982. The Opening Ceremony was held at the QEII Stadium (named after Elizabeth II), in the Brisbane suburb of Nathan. The QEII Stadium was also the athletics and archery events venue. Other events were held at the purpose-built Sleeman Sports Complex in Chandler.

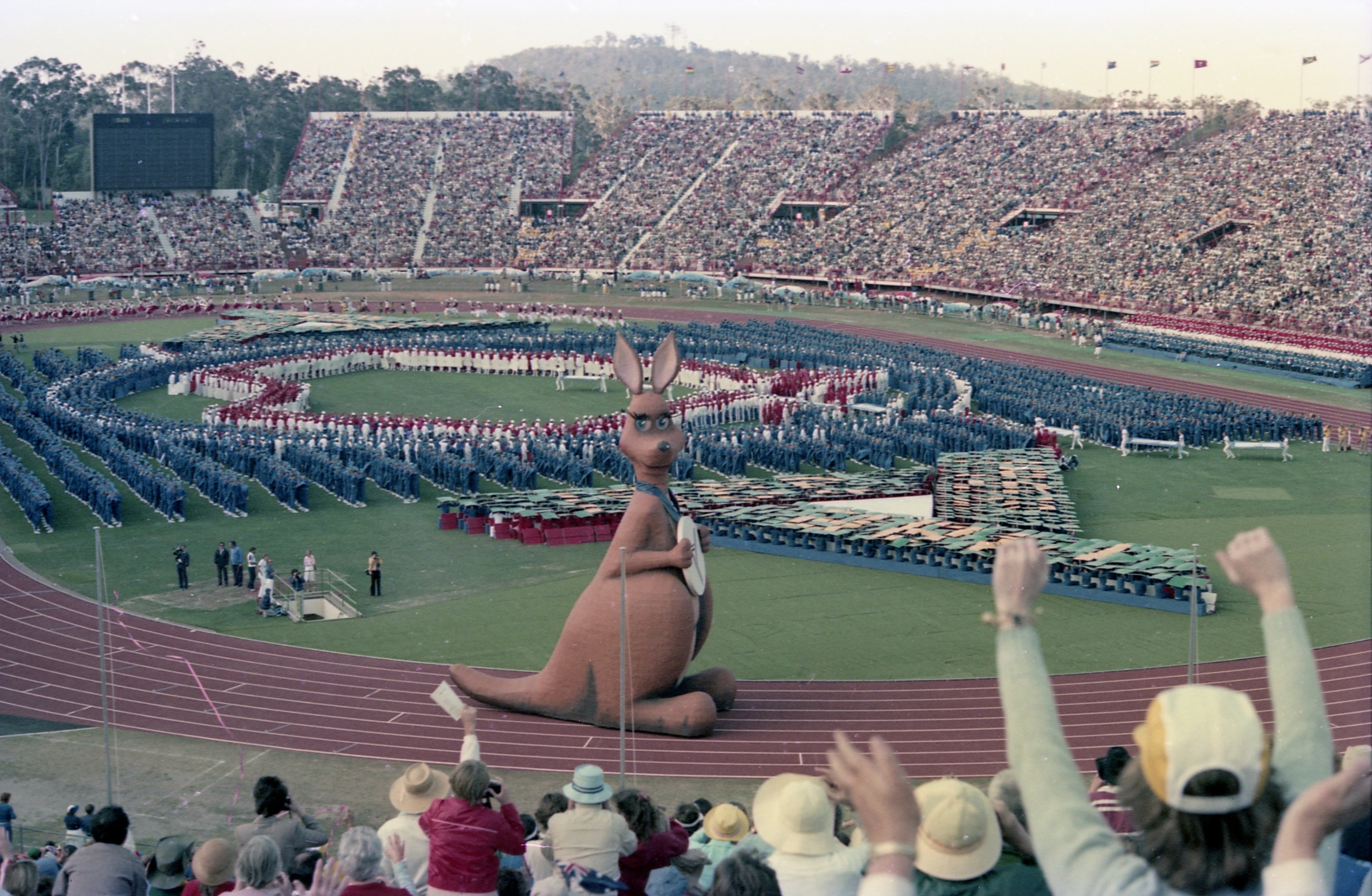
The QEII Stadium

The Chairman of the 1982 Commonwealth Games was Sir Edward Williams. The 1982 Commonwealth Games Logo was designed by Hugh Edwards. The symbol is derived from the form of a bounding kangaroo. The three bands, forming stylized A's (for Australia), and is in colours which are common to flags of many Commonwealth countries.

The mascot for the games was also designed by Hugh Edwards and is a caricature of a kangaroo was named Matilda. A 13-meter-high (43-foot) mechanical kangaroo travelled around the stadium and winked at the crowd.

The event was officially opened by The Duke of Edinburgh and closed by Elizabeth II.

== Host selection ==
Bidding for the XII Commonwealth Games was held in Montreal, Canada, at the 1976 Montreal Summer Olympics. Lagos, Brisbane, Kuala Lumpur, and Birmingham were the bidding cities. On 14 July 1976, it was announced that Brisbane had won the rights to stage the Games after the other candidate cities withdrew bids. Sixteen years after the Brisbane Games, Kuala Lumpur hosted the 1998 Commonwealth Games, while Birmingham hosted the 2022 Commonwealth Games.

Brisbane was awarded the Games by default after being the only candidate city left at the bid election after Birmingham reversed its decision to submit an application. Nigeria's boycott of the 1976 Summer Olympics in Montreal made Lagos' bid lobbying impractical. The 1976 Summer Olympics in Montreal were plagued with cost overruns, and bidding on a sports festival anywhere in the world was not good politically.

== Participating teams ==
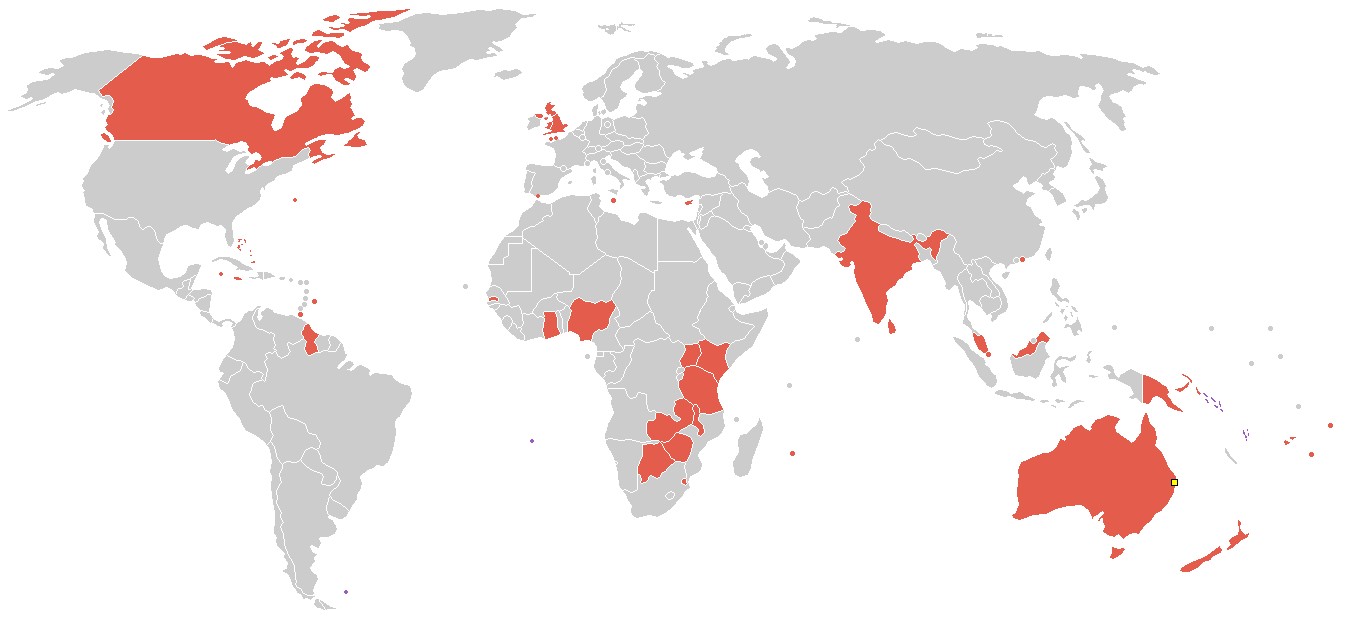
Countries and places which competed at the 1982 games

Forty-six Commonwealth nations and territories took part in the 1982 Commonwealth Games. A total of 1,583 athletes and 571 officials participated in the event. The Griffith University student dormitories in the adjoining Nathan Campus were used as athletes' villages.

Participating Commonwealth countries and territories
- Australia (host)
- Bahamas
- Barbados
- Bermuda
- Botswana
- Canada
- Cayman Islands
- Cyprus
- England
- Falkland Islands
- Fiji
- Ghana
- Gibraltar
- Grenada
- Guernsey
- Guyana
- Hong Kong
- India
- Isle of Man
- Jamaica
- Jersey
- Kenya
- Malawi
- Malaysia
- Malta
- Mauritius
- New Zealand
- Nigeria
- Northern Ireland
- Papua New Guinea
- Saint Helena
- Scotland
- Singapore
- Solomon Islands
- Sri Lanka
- Swaziland
- Tanzania
- The Gambia
- Tonga
- Trinidad and Tobago
- Uganda
- Vanuatu
- Wales
- Western Samoa
- Zambia
- Zimbabwe
Debuting Commonwealth countries and territories
- Falkland Islands
- Saint Helena
- Solomon Islands
- Vanuatu

Note: The Falkland Islands debut at the games was less than four months after the Falklands War.

== Venues ==
Main Venues

- Queen Elizabeth II Jubilee Sports Centre
- Chandler Sports Complex:
  - Chandler Aquatic Centre – swimming and diving;
  - Chandler Sports Hall – badminton and table tennis;
  - Chandler Theatre – weightlifting;
  - Chandler Velodrome – track cycling
- Brisbane City Hall – wrestling
- Brisbane Festival Hall – boxing
- Belmont Rifle Range – shooting
- Moorooka Bowls Club – lawn bowls
- Murarrie Recreation Reserve – archery
- Loop around Mount Petrie – cycling road race
- Brisbane River roads – marathon

Standalone Venues

- Wynnum and Manly roads – 30 km walk
- Woolloongabba Cricket Ground – Australian football demonstration
- Athletes Village – Griffith University and Mount Gravatt College of Advanced Education.

== Ceremonies ==
=== Opening ceremony ===
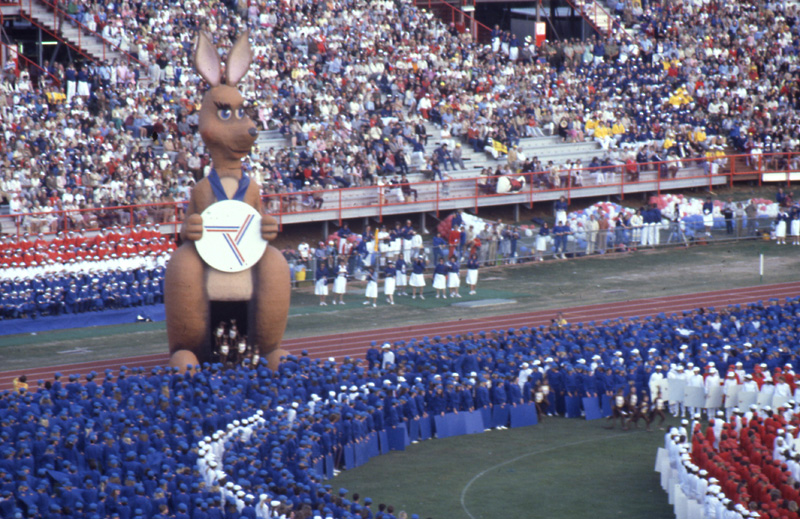
Opening ceremony of the 1982 Commonwealth Games in Brisbane with mascot Matilda winking to the crowd

The ceremony at the QEII Stadium was held on a fine but extremely windy day. The wind was so strong that skydivers who were going to descend into the stadium were cancelled. Instead they made an entrance at the closing ceremony.

=== Closing ceremony ===
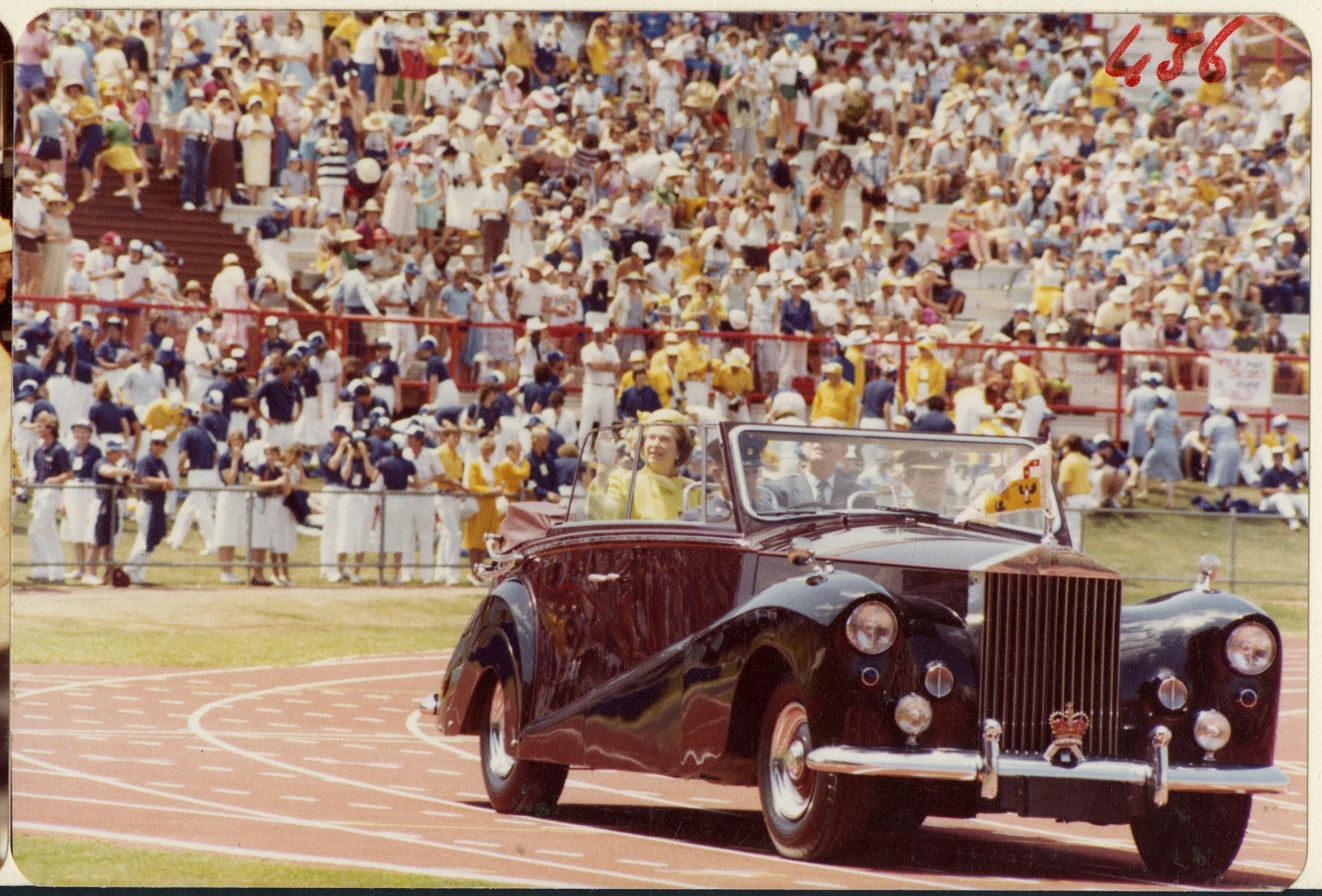
Her Majesty The Queen at the Closing Ceremony of the Games

Elizabeth II closed the Games during a colourful ceremony, which included parachute jumpers (who had originally been also intended as part of the Opening Ceremony display) jumping and landing in a special target area within the stadium and red, white and blue balloons. Matilda the Kangaroo also winked at the Queen. Following the closing of the Games, the Queen and the Duke left the stand to be driven from the stadium. However, nobody wanted the Games to end and the Australian team formed a 'guard of honour' and ran beside and behind the car in which Queen Elizabeth and Prince Philip were travelling, as it circled the stadium several times before finally leaving. Team members from other countries also joined in running after the royal car.

== Sports ==
Sports contested during the 1982 Commonwealth Games included athletics, archery, badminton, lawn bowls, boxing, cycling, shooting, swimming, diving, weightlifting and wrestling.

Table tennis and Australian rules football were demonstration sports, with the latter being demonstrated at a 6 October rematch at the Gabba of that year's VFL Grand Final, which took place just 11 days before at the Melbourne Cricket Ground. Richmond won the demonstration rematch with a score of 28.16 (184) to Carlton's 26.10 (166).

- Aquatics ()
  - Diving ()
  - Swimming ()
- Archery ()
- Athletics ()
- Badminton ()
- Boxing ()
- Cycling ()
- Lawn bowls ()
- Shooting ()
- Weightlifting ()
- Wrestling ()

== Medal table ==
This is the full table of the medal count of the 1982 Commonwealth Games. These rankings sort by the number of gold medals earned by a country. The number of silvers is taken into consideration next and then the number of bronze. If, after the above, countries are still tied, equal ranking is given and they are listed alphabetically. This follows the system used by the IOC, IAAF and BBC.

* Host nation (Australia)

Rank	Nation	Gold	Silver	Bronze	Total
1	Australia*	39	39	29	107
2	England	38	38	32	108
3	Canada	26	23	33	82
4	Scotland	8	6	12	26
5	New Zealand	5	8	13	26
6	India	5	8	3	16
7	Nigeria	5	0	8	13
8	Wales	4	4	1	9
9	Kenya	4	2	4	10
10	Bahamas	2	2	2	6
11	Jamaica	2	1	1	4
12	Tanzania	1	2	2	5
13	Malaysia	1	0	1	2
14	Fiji	1	0	0	1
14	Hong Kong (HKG)	1	0	0	1
14	Zimbabwe	1	0	0	1
17	Northern Ireland	0	3	3	6
18	Uganda	0	3	0	3
19	Zambia	0	1	5	6
20	Guernsey	0	1	1	2
21	Bermuda	0	0	1	1
21	Singapore	0	0	1	1
21	Swaziland	0	0	1	1
Totals (23 entries)		143	141	153	437

== Highlights ==
=== Day 1 (1 October) ===
The first event of the Games was 100 kilometres (62 mi) Road Trial in cycling. England won the Gold Medal in the event, and Australia won the Silver Medal—coming second to England by only six seconds.

Other sports which were contested on the first day of competition included swimming and diving, weightlifting, shooting and bowls.

=== Day 2 (2 October) ===
Sports contested included swimming, diving, weightlifting, shooting, cycling, bowls and archery.

The day was marred by both Australia and Canada being disqualified in the 4 × 100 metres relay in swimming, both problems occurring during change-overs. The medals awarded for this race went to England, Scotland and New Zealand.

=== Day 4 (4 October) ===
Sports contested included swimming, diving, cycling, athletics, archery, hammer throwing and shooting.

The day was marred when Canada was again disqualified, this time in the 4 × 200 metres freestyle relay. Canada protested against the winners, Australia, as well as against their own disqualification.

== Aboriginal movement protests ==
The Brisbane Commonwealth Games were also notable for large-scale protests by the Aboriginal rights movement in Australia, which brought to the centre of international media attention the lack of Indigenous land rights in Australia, poor living condition and suppression of personal and political rights in Queensland in particular, and in Australia as a whole. One of the targets of the protests was Queensland's Aborigines Act 1971, which restricted and controlled the lives of Aboriginal people in Queensland.

There were large marches on 26 September (2,000 people), 20 September (1000), and a sit-in of 104 people on 4 October. Also on that day, around 20 spectators held Aboriginal flags in the stadium during the entire program. On 7 October, about 500 people attended another protest, and 400 police arrested 260 people, including then Governor-General's daughter, Ann Stephen. The protests were all peaceful, but police came out in force and blocked roads, making arrests under Queensland's Traffic Act.

Activists taking part in the protests included Gary Foley and Bob Weatherall (both leaders of the protest); Billy Craigie; Lyall Munro Jnr; Ross Watson; Wayne Wharton; and Selwyn Johnson and his family. Selwyn's brother Hedley Johnson was a musician, of the Brisbane group Mop and the Dropouts. Their song, "Brisbane Blacks", written by Mop Conlon, became a kind of anthem for the protests.

Bob Weatherall, a Kamilaroi elder, is a lifelong activist, a researcher in Aboriginal history, and musical collaborator with Brisbane band Halfway

The protests, which were followed by large-scale arrests, are a significant event in the history of the Australian Aboriginal rights movement. When the Commonwealth Games returned to Australia in 2018 at the Gold Coast, it drew a series of peaceful protests.

The documentary Guniwaya Ngigu also called We Fight (1982) follows the Aboriginal protest movement during the Commonwealth Games, and was directed by Madeline McGrady and Tracey Moffatt, and produced by Maureen Watson, Tiga Bayles and Madeline McGrady.

== Legacy ==
In 2009 as part of the Q150 celebrations, the 1982 Commonwealth Games were announced as one of the Q150 Icons of Queensland for its role as a "Defining Moment". Brisbane also bid for the 1992 Summer Olympics but lost to Barcelona. Queensland Premier Annastacia Palaszczuk announced on 9 December 2019 that the state will make an official bid for the 2032 Summer Olympics and Paralympics featuring venues across Brisbane, Gold Coast and Sunshine Coast. In 2021, the city won the bid to host the 2032 Summer Olympics and Paralympics.

== See also ==
- World Expo 88, another international event held in Brisbane in the 1980s
- Commonwealth Games celebrated in Australia
  - 1938 Commonwealth Games – Sydney
  - 1962 Commonwealth Games – Perth
  - 2006 Commonwealth Games – Melbourne
  - 2018 Commonwealth Games – Gold Coast
- Commonwealth Youth Games celebrated in Australia
  - 2004 Commonwealth Youth Games – Bendigo
- Olympic Games celebrated in Australia
  - 1956 Summer Olympics – Melbourne
  - 2000 Summer Olympics – Sydney
  - 2032 Summer Olympics – Brisbane
- Paralympic Games celebrated in Australia
  - 2000 Summer Paralympics – Sydney
  - 2032 Summer Paralympics – Brisbane

== Other sources ==
- "XII Commonwealth Games – The Official Pictorial History" —Channel 9 "Today Tonight", O & B Holdings Pty. Ltd., (1982)

Preceded by Edmonton	Commonwealth Games; Brisbane; XII Commonwealth Games	Succeeded by Edinburgh
