= Northern Ireland at the 1998 Commonwealth Games =

- Flag of Northern Ireland
- CGF code: NIR
- CGA: Northern Ireland Commonwealth Games Council
- Website: teamni.org

in Kuala Lumpur, Malaysia 11 September 1998 – 21 September 1998
- Medals Ranked 13th: Gold 2 Silver 1 Bronze 2 Total 5

Commonwealth Games appearances (overview)
- 1934; 1938; 1950; 1954; 1958; 1962; 1966; 1970; 1974; 1978; 1982; 1986; 1990; 1994; 1998; 2002; 2006; 2010; 2014; 2018; 2022; 2026; 2030

Other related appearances
- Ireland (1930)

Northern Ireland competed at the 1998 Commonwealth Games in Kuala Lumpur, Malaysia from 11 to 21 September 1998. It was Northern Ireland's 14th appearance at the Commonwealth Games.

Northern Ireland finished 13th in the medal table with two gold medals, one silver medals and two bronze medals.

The team was named on 15 June 1998 and included a cricket team, replacing England who withdrew from the 16 team event.

== Medalists ==
The following Northern Irish competitors won medals at the games. In the discipline sections below, the medalists' names are bolded.

Medal	Name	Sport
Gold	David Calvert; Martin Millar	Shooting (Fullbore rifle pair)
Gold	Gary McCloy; Ian McClure; Martin McHugh; Neil Booth	Lawn bowls (fours)
Silver	Liam Cunningham	Boxing (flyweight)
Bronze	Brian Magee	Boxing (middleweight)
Bronze	Jeremy Henry	Lawn bowls (singles)

== Team and events ==
=== Athletics ===
Men

Athlete	Events	Club	Medals
Ian Craig	100, 200m		
Dermot Donnelly	10,000m		
Matthew Douglas	110m hurdles, 400m hurdles, 4x400m relay		
Brian Forbes	400m, 4x400m relay		
Richard Thomas Girvan	800m		
Eddie King	800m, 1500m, 4x400m relay		
Paul McBurney	200m, 400m, 4x400m relay		
Neil Young	pole vault		

Women

Athlete	Events	Club	Medals
Amanda Crowe	800m, 1500m		
Victoria Anne Jamison	400m hurdles		
Stephanie Llewellyn	200m, 400m		
Jackie McKernan	discus throw		

=== Badminton ===
Men

Athlete	Events	Club	Medals
Leslie Dewart	singles, team	Cavehill BC	
David Geddes	singles, team	Alpha BC, Lisburn	
Graham Henderson	doubles, mixed	Alpha BC, Lisburn	
Eugene McKenna	doubles	Alpha BC, Lisburn	
Bruce Topping	singles, mixed, team	Alpha BC, Lisburn	
Michael Watt	singles, team	Alpha BC, Lisburn	

Women

Athlete	Events	Club	Medals
Jayne Plunkett	singles, doubles, mixed, team	Alpha BC, Lisburn	
Claire Henderson	singles, doubles, mixed, team	Alpha BC, Lisburn	

=== Boxing ===
Athlete	Events	Club	Medals
Billy Cowan	67kg welterweight		
Liam Cunningham	51kg flyweight		Silver medal
James Lowry	57kg featherweight		
Brian Magee	75kg middleweight		Bronze medal
Conor McAllister	60kg lightweight		
Ben McGarrigle	91kg heavyweight		
Paul McCloskey	63.5kg light-welterweight		

=== Cricket ===
Northern Ireland named the below squad for the tournament.

Roster

- Alan Rutherford (c & wk)
- Neil Anderson
- Neil Carson
- Gordon Cooke
- Dekker Curry
- Ryan Eagleson
- Peter Gillespie
- Derek Heasley
- Kyle McCallan
- Paul McCrum
- Gary Neely
- Andrew Patterson
- Mark Patterson
- Stephen Smyth

Summary

Team	Event	Group stage				Semifinal	Final / BM	
Team	Event	Opposition Result	Opposition Result	Opposition Result	Rank	Opposition Result	Opposition Result	Rank
Northern Ireland men	Men's tournament	South Africa; **L** by 4 wickets (D/L)	Barbados; **L** by 176 runs	Bangladesh; **W** by 114 runs	3	did not advance		12

Group stage

Group C
Pos	Team	Pld	W	L	T	NR	Pts	NRR
1	South Africa	3	3	0	0	0	**6**	1.143
2	Barbados	3	2	1	0	0	**4**	1.330
3	Northern Ireland	3	1	2	0	0	**2**	−0.643
4	Bangladesh	3	0	3	0	0	**0**	−1.547

Source: ESPNcricinfo

10 September 1998
10:00
Scorecard

**Northern Ireland**; 89/5 (38.1 overs)	**v**	**South Africa**; 133/6 (31.4 overs)
Neil Carson 22* (54); Jacques Kallis 1/3 (4 overs)		Dale Benkenstein 44* (64); Ryan Eagleson 3/28 (7.4 overs)

**South Africa won by 4 wickets (D/L method)**
Kelab Aman, Kuala Lumpur
Umpires: Eddie Nicholls (Guy) and Subhash Modi (Ken)

- South Africa won the toss and elected to field.
- Rain halted play after 38.1 overs in the Northern Ireland innings. South Africa's target was 131 runs from 38 overs.
- Neil Carson (NI) made his List A debut.
- Paul McCrum (NI) played his final List A match.
- Points: South Africa 2, Northern Ireland 0.

13 September 1998
10:00
Scorecard

**Barbados**; 296/5 (50 overs)	**v**	**Northern Ireland**; 120/7 (50 overs)
Philo Wallace 92; Dekker Curry 2/42 (10 overs)		Stephen Smyth 58; Ottis Gibson 2/18 (7 overs)

**Barbados won by 176 runs**
Rubber Research Institute Ground, Shah Alam
Umpires: Javed Akhtar (Pak) and William Smith (Sco)

- Northern Ireland won the toss and elected to field.
- Ryan Hinds (Bar) made his List A debut.
- Points: Barbados 2, Northern Ireland 0.
- Northern Ireland were eliminated as a result of this match.

15 September 1998
10:00
Scorecard

**Northern Ireland**; 177 (49.5 overs)	**v**	**Bangladesh**; 63 (21 overs)
Kyle McCallan 53*; Morshed Ali Khan 2/19 (7 overs)		Khaled Mahmud 27; Gordon Cooke 5/35 (10 overs)

**Northern Ireland won by 114 runs**
Royal Selangor Club, Kuala Lumpur
Umpires: Nizam Baksh (Can) and Saleem Badar (Pak)

- Bangladesh won the toss and elected to field.
- Neil Anderson (NI) played his only List A match.
- Dekker Curry (NI) played his final List A match.
- Gordon Cooke (NI) took his only List A five-wicket haul.
- Points: Northern Ireland 2, Bangladesh 0.

=== Cycling ===
Men

Athlete	Events	Club	Medals
John Boone	time trial		
Ian Chivers	road race		
Denis Easton	road race		
Tommy Evans	road race		
Scott Hamilton	time trial		
Conor Henry	road race		
David McCall	road race		
David McCann	time trial		
Alwyn McMath	time trial, sprint		
Neil Teggart	road race, time trial		

=== Gymnastics ===
Women

Athlete	Events	Club	Medals
Zoe Brown	all-round, team		
Laura Dwyer	all-round, team		
Debbie McLarnon	rhythmic		
Holly Murdock	all-round, vault, team		

=== Lawn bowls ===
Men

Athlete	Events	Club	Medals
Sammy Allen	pairs	Ballymena BC	
Neil Booth	fours	Old Bleach BC	Gold medal
Martin McHugh	fours	Whitehead BC	Gold medal
Jeremy Henry	singles	Portrush BC	Bronze medal
Noel Graham	pairs	Lisnagarvey BC	
Ian McClure	fours	Portrush BC	Gold medal
Gary McCloy	fours	Portrush BC	Gold medal

Women

Athlete	Events	Club	Medals
Barbara Cameron	pairs	Ballymena BC	
Alicia Crangle	fours	Salisbury BC	
Patricia Horner	fours	NI Civil Service BC	
Donna McNally	fours	Ballymena BC	
Margaret Johnston	singles	Ballymoney BC	
Geraldine Law	fours	NI Civil Service BC	
Paula Montgomery	pairs	NI Civil Service BC	

=== Shooting ===
Men

Athlete	Events	Medals
David Calvert	fullbore rifle, fullbore rifle pairs	Gold medal
David Clarke	air rifle, pair	
Robert Clarke	air rifle, pair	
David Evans	trap, pair	
Tom Hewitt	trap, pair	
Alan Lewis	rifle 3pos	
Mervyn McFarland	air, free, centre fire pistol	
Martin Millar	fullbore rifle, fullbore rifle pairs	Gold medal
Cliff Ogle	rifle 3pos, prone, pair	
Mark Stevenson	rifle prone, pair	

=== Squash ===
Men

Athlete	Events	Club	Medals
Steve Richardson	singles, mixed	Ballymena	

Women

Athlete	Events	Club	Medals
Madeline Perry	singles, mixed	Banbridge	

=== Swimming ===
Men

Athlete	Events	Club	Medals
Andrew Bree	200m breaststroke, 200, 400 medley		
Neil Cameron	400 free		
Michael Williamson	200 medley		

Women

Athlete	Events	Club	Medals
Lorna Cardwell	100, 200m butterfly, relay x 2		
Julie Douglas	50 free, relay x 2		
Emma Robinson	100, 200m breaststroke, 50 free, relay x 2		
Louise C. Robinson	100m breaststroke, 50 free, relay x 2		

=== Tenpin bowling ===
Men

Athlete	Events	Club	Medals
Kenneth Donnelly	singles, doubles		
Gary Stoops	singles, doubles		

=== Weightlifting ===
Men

Athlete	Events	Medals
James Power	62kg	
