= Northern Ireland at the 2002 Commonwealth Games =

- CGF code: NIR
- CGA: Northern Ireland Commonwealth Games Council
- Website: nicgc.org

in Manchester, England
- Medals Ranked 17th: Gold 2 Silver 1 Bronze 1 Total 4

Commonwealth Games appearances (overview)
- 1934; 1938; 1950; 1954; 1958; 1962; 1966; 1970; 1974; 1978; 1982; 1986; 1990; 1994; 1998; 2002; 2006; 2010; 2014; 2018; 2022; 2026; 2030

Other related appearances
- Ireland (1930)

Northern Ireland competed at the 2002 Commonwealth Games in Manchester, England, from 25 July to 4 August 2002.

Northern Ireland finished 17th in the medal table with two gold medals, two silver medals and one bronze medal.

The Northern Irish team was named on 5 June 2002.

== Medalists ==
=== Gold ===
- David Calvert (shooting)
- Men's fullbore rifle pairs (shooting)

=== Silver ===
- Lisa Bradley (judo)
- Jeremy Henry (lawn bowls)

=== Bronze ===
- Men's fours (lawn bowls)

== Team ==
=== Athletics ===
Men

| Athlete | Events | Club | Medals |
|---|---|---|---|
| Michael Allen | javelin throw | | |
| James McIlroy | 800m | | |
| Paul McKee | 200, 400m | | |
| Colm McLean | 1500m | | |

Women

| Athlete | Events | Club | Medals |
|---|---|---|---|
| Teresa McCluskey | marathon | | |
| Kelly McNeice | 800, 1500m | | |
| Tamsin Stephens | 200m, 100m hurdles | | |

=== Badminton ===
Men

| Athlete | Events | Club | Medals |
|---|---|---|---|
| David Geddes | singles, men's doubles | Alpha BC, Lisburn | |
| Graham Henderson | men's doubles | Alpha BC, Lisburn | |
| Eugene McKenna | men's doubles | Alpha BC, Lisburn | |
| Bruce Topping | singles, men's doubles, mixed doubles | Alpha BC, Lisburn | |

Women

| Athlete | Events | Club | Medals |
|---|---|---|---|
| Claire Henderson | singles, women's doubles | Alpha BC, Lisburn | |
| Lisa Lynas | singles | Alpha BC, Lisburn | |
| Jayne Plunkett | women's doubles, mixed doubles | Alpha BC, Lisburn | |

=== Boxing ===
| Athlete | Events | Club | Medals |
|---|---|---|---|
| Paul Baker | 48kg lightweight | | |
| Conall Carmichael | 75kg middleweight | | |
| Liam Cunningham | 51kg flyweight | | |
| Shane Curran | 91kg heavyweight | | |
| Martin Lindsay | 54kg bantamweight | | |
| Gerard McAuley | 71kg light middleweight | | |
| Paul McCloskey | 63.5kg light-welterweight | | |
| Gary McClure | 67kg welterweight | | |
| Cathal McMonagle | +91kg super heavyweight | | |
| Kevin O'Hara | 57kg featherweight | | |

=== Cycling ===
Men

| Athlete | Events | Club | Medals |
|---|---|---|---|
| Brendan Doherty | road race, time trial | | |
| Denis Easton | road race | | |
| Tommy Evans | road race | | |
| Stephen Gallagher | road race | | |
| David Gardiner | road race | | |
| Michael Hutchinson | time trial, pursuit | | |
| Glenn Kinning | mountain bike | | |
| David McCann | road race, time trial | | |
| Alwyn McMath | scratch, sprint | | |

=== Gymnastics ===
Women

| Athlete | Events | Club | Medals |
|---|---|---|---|
| Ruth Cosgrave | all-round, team | | |
| Victoria Martin | all-round, team | | |
| Katie Elizabeth Slader | all-round, floor, beam, team | | |

=== Judo ===
Men

| Athlete | Events | Club | Medals |
|---|---|---|---|
| Simon Childs | 81kg half-middleweight | | |
| Chris Donnelly | 73kg lightweight | | |
| Paul Green | 90kg middleweight | | |
| Scott Mayne | 66kg half-lightweight | | |
| Mark Montgomery | 100kg half-heavyweight | | |
| Stuart Vickers | 60kg extra-lightweight | | |

Women

| Athlete | Events | Club | Medals |
|---|---|---|---|
| Lisa Bradley | 52kg half-lightweight | | Bronze medal |
| Claire Rainey | 70kg middleweight | | |

=== Lawn bowls ===
Men

| Athlete | Events | Club | Medals |
|---|---|---|---|
| Jim Baker | fours | Ballymena BC | Bronze medal |
| Neil Booth | fours | Old Bleach BC | Bronze medal |
| Noel Graham | fours | Lisnagarvey BC | Bronze medal |
| Jeremy Henry | singles | Portrush BC | Silver medal |
| Gary McCloy | pairs | Portrush BC | |
| Martin McHugh | pairs | Whitehead BC | |
| Michael Nutt | fours | Old Bleach BC | Bronze medal |

Women

| Athlete | Events | Club | Medals |
|---|---|---|---|
| Dessa Baird | fours | Limavady BC | |
| Barbara Cameron | pairs | Ballymena BC | |
| Pat Horner | fours | NI Civil Service BC, Belfast | |
| Margaret Johnston | singles | Ballymoney BC | |
| Donna McNally | pairs | Comber BC | |
| Paula Montgomery | fours | NI Civil Service BC, Belfast | |
| Alicia Weir | fours | Salisbury BC | |

=== Shooting ===
Men

| Athlete | Events | Medals |
|---|---|---|
| Thomas Allen | trap, doubletrap, pairx2 | |
| David Calvert | fullbore rifle, fullbore rifle pairs | , |
| Robert Doak | air pistol, 50m, centre, pairx2 | |
| Gary Duff | 3pos, pair, prone | |
| Alan Lewis | 3pos, pair, prone | |
| Martin Millar | fullbore rifle, fullbore rifle pairs | Gold medal |
| Philip Murphy | trap, doubletrap, pairx2 | |
| Hugh Duncan Stewart | air pistol, 25m, centre, pairx2 | |

=== Squash ===
Men

| Athlete | Events | Club | Medals |
|---|---|---|---|
| Steve Richardson | singles, mixed | Ballymena | |

Women

| Athlete | Events | Club | Medals |
|---|---|---|---|
| Madeline Perry | singles, mixed | Banbridge | |

=== Swimming ===
Men

| Athlete | Events | Club | Medals |
|---|---|---|---|
| Andrew Bree | 100, 200m breaststroke, 200 Medley | | |
| Michael Williamson | 100, 200m breaststroke | | |

Women

| Athlete | Events | Club | Medals |
|---|---|---|---|
| Julie Douglas | 50m, 100m freestyle, 50m butterfly | | |
| Emma Robinson | 50m, 100m breaststroke | | |

=== Table tennis ===
Men

| Athlete | Events | Club | Medals |
|---|---|---|---|
| Jonathan Cowan | singles, doubles, mixed, team | | |
| Andrew Dennison | singles, doubles, mixed, team | | |
| Daryl Strong | singles, mixed, team | | |

Women

| Athlete | Events | Club | Medals |
|---|---|---|---|
| Andrea Glover | singles, mixed, team | | |
| Michelle McGreevy | singles, mixed, team | | |
| Jing Yi Gao | singles, mixed, team | | |

=== Triathlon ===
Men

| Athlete | Events | Club | Medals |
|---|---|---|---|
| Gavin Noble | individual | | |
| Mark Tosh | individual | | |
| Trevor Woods | individual | | |

Women

| Athlete | Events | Club | Medals |
|---|---|---|---|
| Julie Murphy | individual | | |

=== Weightlifting ===
| Athlete | Events | Club | Medals |
|---|---|---|---|
| James Stewart | 77kg | | |
