= 1982 World Indoor Bowls Championship =

Bowls championship held in Coatbridge, North Lanarkshire

World Indoor Championships 1982
- 4th World Indoor Bowls Championships
- Location: (Scotland) Coatbridge, North Lanarkshire
- Date: 9–14 February 1982.
- Category: World Indoor Championships

The 1982 Embassy World Indoor Bowls Championship was held at the Coatbridge indoor bowling club, North Lanarkshire, Scotland, from 9 to 14 February 1982.

Sudden death was introduced with 16 competitors (4 from a qualifying tournament), it replaced the group format. The winners prize was £4,000, a record for bowls. John Dunn an 18-year-old from Tonbridge Wells defeated David Bryant, ending Bryant’s attempt to secure a fourth consecutive world title.

John Watson won the title beating Jim Baker in the final. The third place play off was won by John Dunn who defeated John Fullarton 21–19.

== Men's singles ==
=== Qualifying ===
Qualifying held in Dalkeith.

Group A results

| Player 1 | Player 2 | Score |
|---|---|---|
| Wood | Greer | 21–6 |
| Wood | Dunton | 21–17 |
| Wood | Hindmarsh | 21–13 |
| Greer | Dunton | 21–16 |
| Greer | Hindmarsh | 21–0 |
| Dunton | Hindmarsh | 21–17 |

| Pos | Player | W | L | +/- |
|---|---|---|---|---|
| 1 | (Scotland) Willie Wood | 3 | 0 | +27 |
| 2 | (Republic of Ireland) John Greer | 2 | 1 | +11 |
| 3 | (England) Tony Dunton | 1 | 2 | -5 |
| 4 | (Wales) George Hindmarsh | 0 | 3 | -33 |

Group B results

| Player 1 | Player 2 | Score |
|---|---|---|
| Boyle | Stanfield | 21–12 |
| Boyle | Bell | 21–5 |
| Boyle | Craig | 21–12 |
| Stanfield | Bell | 18–21 |
| Stanfield | Craig | 21–12 |
| Bell | Craig | 20–21 |

| Pos | Player | W | L | +/- |
|---|---|---|---|---|
| 1 | (Scotland) Jim Boyle | 3 | 0 | +34 |
| 2 | (Wales) Leon Stanfield | 1 | 2 | -3 |
| 3 | (England) Derek Bell | 1 | 2 | -14 |
| 4 | (Republic of Ireland) Joe Craig | 1 | 2 | -17 |

Group C results

| Player 1 | Player 2 | Score |
|---|---|---|
| Watson | McKelvey | 21–10 |
| Watson | Hughes | 17–21 |
| Watson | Osling | 21–12 |
| Hughes | Osling | 21–9 |
| McKelvey | Hughes | 21–12 |
| McKelvey | Osling | 21–9 |

| Pos | Player | W | L | +/- |
|---|---|---|---|---|
| 1 | (Scotland) John Watson | 2 | 1 | +16 |
| 2 | (Republic of Ireland) Billy McKelvey | 2 | 1 | +10 |
| 3 | (England) Mal Hughes | 1 | 2 | +7 |
| 4 | (Wales) Denis Osling | 0 | 3 | -33 |

Group D results

| Player 1 | Player 2 | Score |
|---|---|---|
| Cutler | Campbell | 21–10 |
| Cutler | Gourlay Sr. | 21–17 |
| Cutler | Thomas | 21–21 |
| Gourlay Sr. | Campbell | 21–13 |
| Gourlay Sr. | Thomas | 21–12 |
| Campbell | Thomas | 21–14 |

| Pos | Player | W | L | +/- |
|---|---|---|---|---|
| 1 | (England) David Cutler | 2 | 1 | +14 |
| 2 | (Scotland) David Gourlay Sr. | 2 | 1 | +13 |
| 3 | (Republic of Ireland) Colin Campbell | 1 | 2 | -12 |
| 4 | (Wales) John Thomas | 1 | 2 | -15 |

=== Final tournament ===
First round
(Scotland) John Watson | 21
(Zimbabwe) Pat O'Brien | 12
(New Zealand) Peter Bryant | 21
(Hong Kong) David Tso | 17
(Scotland) John Fullarton | 21
(England) David Cutler | 17
(Scotland) Willie Wood | 21
(Wales) John Price | 16
(Northern Ireland) Jim Baker | 21
(United States) Skippy Arculli | 10
(Scotland) Jim Boyle | 21
(Guernsey) Michael Pike | 10
(England) John Dunn | 21
(Canada) Barrie McFadden | 15
(England) David Bryant | 21
(Australia) Jack Hosking | 17

Quarter-finals
(Scotland) Watson | 21
(New Zealand) Bryant P | 2
(Scotland) Fullarton | 21
(Scotland) Wood | 12
(Northern Ireland) Baker | 21
(Scotland) Boyle | 14
(England) Dunn | 21
(England) Bryant D | 20

Semi-finals
(Scotland) Watson | 21
(Scotland) Fullarton | 15
(Northern Ireland) Baker | 21
(England) Dunn | 12

Final
(Scotland) Watson | 21
(Northern Ireland) Baker | 13
