= Northern Ireland at the 2006 Commonwealth Games =

- CG code: NIR
- CGA: Northern Ireland Commonwealth Games Council
- Website: nicgc.org

in Melbourne, Australia
- Competitors: 64
- Flag bearers: Opening: Closing:
- Medals Ranked 24th: Gold 0 Silver 2 Bronze 0 Total 2

Commonwealth Games appearances (overview)
- 1934; 1938; 1950; 1954; 1958; 1962; 1966; 1970; 1974; 1978; 1982; 1986; 1990; 1994; 1998; 2002; 2006; 2010; 2014; 2018; 2022; 2026; 2030

Other related appearances
- Ireland (1930)

Northern Ireland competed at the 2006 Commonwealth Games in Melbourne, Australia, from 15 to 26 March 2006.

A team of 64 athletes attended the Games and Northern Ireland finished 24th in the medal table with two silver medals.

== Medals ==
	(gold)	(silver)	(bronze)	Total
Northern Ireland	0	2	0	2

== Medal winners ==
Silver

- Lawn Bowls Men's Triples: Mark McPeak, Jeremy Henry, Neil Booth.
- David Beattie for the men's individual trap in Shooting.

== Team ==
=== Athletics ===
Men

Athlete	Events	Heat		Quarterfinal		Semifinal		Final	
Athlete	Events	Result	Rank	Result	Rank	Result	Rank	Result	Rank
James McIlroy	800 m	1:49.85	4	did not advance					
James McIlroy	1500 m	DNS	-	did not advance					
Michael Allen	Javelin							70.56	12
Ben Houghton	Javelin							72.46	10

Combined events

Athlete	Event	Final			
Athlete	Event	Discipline	Result	Points	Rank
Brendan McConville	Decathlon	100m	11.88	675	5
Brendan McConville	Decathlon	Long Jump	DNS	-	-
Brendan McConville	Decathlon	Shot Put	DNS	-	-
Brendan McConville	Decathlon	High Jump	DNS	-	-
Brendan McConville	Decathlon	400m	DNS	-	-
Brendan McConville	Decathlon	110m hurdles	DNS	-	-
Brendan McConville	Decathlon	Discus	DNS	-	-
Brendan McConville	Decathlon	Pole Vault	DNS	-	-
Brendan McConville	Decathlon	Javelin	DNS	-	-
Brendan McConville	Decathlon	1500m	DNS	-	-
Brendan McConville	Decathlon	Overall	–	675	–

Women

Track

Athlete	Event	Heat		Semifinal		Final	
Athlete	Event	Result	Rank	Result	Rank	Result	Rank
Anna Boyle	100m	11.65	18 q	11.67	17	did not advance	
Anna Boyle	200m	23.85	14 q	24.03	13	did not advance	

Field

Athlete	Event	Qualifying		Final	
Athlete	Event	Result	Rank	Result	Rank
Eva Massey	Shot Put			14.95	11
Zoe Brown	Pole Vault	4.00m	4	4.00m	12

=== Badminton ===
Men

Athlete	Events	Club
Alex Sim	singles	Alpha BC, Lisburn
Mark Topping	men's doubles, mixed doubles	Alpha BC, Lisburn
Bruce Topping	men's doubles, mixed doubles	Alpha BC, Lisburn

Women

Athlete	Events	Club
Erin Keery	singles, women's doubles, mixed doubles	Alpha BC, Lisburn
Lisa Lynas	singles, women's doubles, mixed doubles	Alpha BC, Lisburn

=== Boxing ===
Men only

Athlete	Events	Club
Paddy Barnes	Light-flyweight 48 kg	
Ciaran Crossan	Light-heavyweight 81 kg	
Dermot Gerard Hamill	Light-welterweight 64 kg	
Thomas Joseph Hamill	Welterweight 69 kg	
Ryan Francis Lindberg	Flyweight 51 kg	
Shaun McKim	Bantamweight 54 kg	
Eamonn John O'Kane	Middleweight 75 kg	

=== Cycling ===
Men

Athlete	Events
Roger Aiken	road race
Ryan Connor	individual time trial, road race
Philip Deignan	did not compete due to injury
Tommy Evans	road race
Lewis Ferguson	mountain bike cross-country, road race
Stephen Gallagher	road race
Michael Hutchinson	individual time trial, 4000m pursuit
Alastair Irvine	team manager
David McCann	individual time trial, road race

=== Gymnastics ===
Men

Athlete	Events
Matthew Cosgrave	Rings

Women

Athlete	Events
Rachel Forde	team
Kara Hare	rhythmic individual all-around
Katie Elizabeth Slader	individual all-around, team
Kathryn Bronagh Ward	individual all-around, team

=== Lawn bowls ===
Men

Athlete	Events	Club
Neil Booth	triples	Old Bleach BC
Noel Graham	pairs	Lisnagarvey BC
Jeremy Henry	triples	Portrush BC
Martin McHugh	singles	Whitehead BC
Mark McPeak	triples	Belmont BC
Jonathan Ross	pairs	Lisnagarvey BC

Women

Athlete	Events	Club
Barbara Cameron	pairs	Ballymena BC
Donna McNally	pairs	Ballymena BC
Margaret Johnston	singles	Ballymoney BC

=== Shooting ===
Men

Athlete	Events
David Beattie	clay pigeon trap, trap pair
David Calvert	fullbore rifle, fullbore rifle pairs
Alan Lewis	50m rifle prone, 50m rifle prone pair
Martin Millar	fullbore rifle, fullbore rifle pairs
Mervyn Morrison	clay pigeon trap, trap pair
Cliff Ogle	50m rifle prone, 50m rifle prone pair
Hugh Duncan Stewart	10m air pistol, 25m standard pistol, centre fire pistol

Women

Athlete	Events
Louise Kathryn Aiken	50m rifle prone

=== Squash ===
Men

Athlete	Events
Steve Richardson	singles, mixed doubles

Women

Athlete	Events
Madeline Perry	singles, mixed doubles

=== Swimming ===
Men

Athlete	Event	Heat		Semifinal		Final	
Athlete	Event	Time	Rank	Time	Rank	Time	Rank
Andrew Bree	50m Breaststroke	29.19	7 Q	29.22	9	did not advance	
Andrew Bree	100m Breaststroke	1:03.12	10 Q	1:03.56	13	did not advance	
Andrew Bree	200m Breaststroke	2:17.45	7 Q			2:14.18	5
Jonathan Nixon	50m Breaststroke	29.72	12 Q	29.49	13	did not advance	
Jonathan Nixon	100m Breaststroke	1:05.19	18	did not advance			
Jonathan Cummings	50m EAD Freestyle	36.75	18			did not advance	
Jonathan Cummings	100m EAD Freestyle	1:18.99	15			did not advance	

Women

Athlete	Event	Heat		Semifinal		Final	
Athlete	Event	Time	Rank	Time	Rank	Time	Rank
Julie Douglas	50m Freestyle	26.30	8 Q	26.28	10	did not advance	
Julie Douglas	100m Freestyle	57.03	13 Q	57.16	14	did not advance	
Julie Douglas	50m Butterfly	28.67	19	did not advance			
Melanie Nocher	50m Backstroke	31.54	15 Q	31.46	14	did not advance	
Melanie Nocher	100m Backstroke	1:05.59	12 Q	1:05.21	12	did not advance	
Melanie Nocher	200m Backstroke	2:18.00	13			did not advance	

=== Table tennis ===
Men

Athlete	Events
Jonathan Cowan	doubles, team
Andrew Dennison	doubles, team
Peter Graham	doubles, team
Jason Sugrue	singles, mixed doubles

=== Triathlon ===
Men

Athlete	Events
Brian Campbell	individual
Gavin Noble	individual

Women

Athlete	Events
Heather Wilson	individual
