= Northern Ireland at the 1990 Commonwealth Games =

- CG code: NIR
- CGA: Northern Ireland Commonwealth Games Council
- Website: nicgc.org

in Auckland, New Zealand
- Flag bearers: Opening: Closing:
- Medals Ranked 13th: Gold 1 Silver 3 Bronze 5 Total 9

Commonwealth Games appearances (overview)
- 1934; 1938; 1950; 1954; 1958; 1962; 1966; 1970; 1974; 1978; 1982; 1986; 1990; 1994; 1998; 2002; 2006; 2010; 2014; 2018; 2022; 2026; 2030

Other related appearances
- Ireland (1930)

Northern Ireland competed at the 1990 Commonwealth Games in Auckland, New Zealand, from 24 January to 3 February 1990.

Northern Ireland finished 13th in the medal table with one gold medal, three silver medals and five bronze medals.

The Northern Irish team was named on 20 September 1990.

== Medalists ==
=== Gold ===
- Wayne McCullough (boxing)

=== Silver ===
- Janet Boyle (high jump)
- Jackie McKernan (discus throw)
- Men's fours (lawn bowls)

=== Bronze ===
- Paul Douglas (boxing)
- Alastair Irvine (cycling)
- Margaret Johnston (lawn bowls)
- Joyce Malley (judo)
- Colin Savage (judo)

== Team ==
=== Athletics ===
Men

Athlete	Events	Club	Medals
Mark Forsythe	long jump		
Mark Kirk	800m, 1500m		

Women

Athlete	Events	Club	Medals
Janet Boyle	high jump		Silver medal
Sharon Hutchings	high jump		
Jackie McKernan	discus throw, shot put		Silver medal
Ursula Mary McKee	1500m, 3000m		
Elaine McLaughlin	400m hurdles		
Moira O'Neill	marathon		
Judith Robinson	100m, 100m hurdles		

=== Badminton ===
Men

Athlete	Events	Club	Medals
Peter Ferguson	doubles, mixed, team	Alpha BC	
Rikki Keag	doubles, mixed, team	Alpha BC	
Liam McKenna	singles, mixed, team	Guernsey	

Women

Athlete	Events	Club	Medals
Tanya Cooke	singles, mixed, team	Alpha BC	
Carol Munster	singles, doubles, mixed, team	Alpha BC	
Ann Stephens	mixed, doubles, team	Alpha BC	

=== Boxing ===
Athlete	Events	Club	Medals
Paul Douglas	+91kg super-heavyweight		Bronze medal
Jonny Erskine	60kg lightweight		
Eddie Fisher	63.5kg light-welterweight		
Paul Ireland	54kg bantamweight		
Joe Lowe	67kg welterweight		
Wayne McCullough	51kg flyweight		Gold medal
Jim Webb	71kg light-middleweight	Holy Trinity ABC, Belfast	

=== Cycling ===
Men

Athlete	Events	Club	Medals
Joseph Barr	team time trial		
Alastair Irvine	road race, scratch, points, team time trial		Silver medal
Malcolm Kane	road race		
David McCall	road race, scratch, points, team time trial		
Cormac McCann	road race, scratch, team time trial		
Andrew Moss	road race		

Women

Athlete	Events	Club	Medals
Vanda McVicker	road race		

=== Gymnastics ===
Women

Athlete	Events	Club	Medals
Barbara Barclay	all-round, team		
Kim Kensett	team		
Suzanne Malcolm	team		
Samantha Taylor	all-round, team		

=== Judo ===
Men

Athlete	Events	Medals
Eric Gwynne	78kg half-middleweight	
Colin Savage	71kg lightweight	Bronze medal
Jim Toland	60kg extra-lightweight	
Ciarán Ward	65kg half-lightweight	
Terry Watt	95kg heavyweight, Open	

Women

Athlete	Events	Medals
Joyce Malley	66kg, Open	Bronze medal

=== Lawn bowls ===
Men

Athlete	Events	Club	Medals
Sammy Allen	fours	Ballymena BC	Silver medal
Jim Baker	fours	Cliftonville BC	Silver medal
David Corkill	singles	Belmont BC	
Victor Dallas	pairs	Coleraine BC	
John McCloughlin	fours	Lisnagarvey BC	Silver medal
Rodney McCutcheon	fours	Bangor BC	Silver medal
Ernie Parkinson	pairs	Belmont BC	

Women

Athlete	Events	Club	Medals
Nan Allely	pairs	Donaghadee BC	
Eileen Bell	pairs	Ballynahinch BC	
Margaret Johnston	singles	Ballymoney BC	Bronze medal

=== Shooting ===
Men

Athlete	Events	Medals
David Calvert	fullbore rifle, fullbore rifle pairs	
David Evans	trap, trap pair	
Tom Hewitt	trap, trap pair	
Martin Mace	rifle 3pos, prone, pairs	
Martin Millar	fullbore rifle, fullbore rifle pairs	
Cliff Ogle	rifle 3pos, prone, pairs	
Robbie Williamson	air pistol, free pistol	

=== Swimming ===
Men

Athlete	Events	Club	Medals
Richard Gheel	100, 200m backstroke, 200 free		
Willie Johnston	100m butterfly, 50m, 100m free		
Philip McGillion	100m breaststroke, 400 free, 200 medley		

Women

Athlete	Events	Club	Medals
Marion Madine	100, 200m butterfly, 50, 100, 200, 400m free		

=== Weightlifting ===
Athlete	Events	Medals
Eamon Byrne	60kg	
