= Stan Espie =

Northern Irish international lawn bowler

Personal information
- Nationality: British (Northern Irish)
- Born: 1934 Belfast, Northern Ireland
- Died: 16 November 2017 (aged 82–83) Belfast, Northern Ireland

Sport
- Sport: Lawn bowls
- Club: Falls BC
Medal record
Representing Ireland
World Outdoor Championships
Gold medal – first place	1984 Aberdeen	Men's triples

Thomas "Stan" Stanley Espie (1934 – 16 November 2017) was an Irish international lawn and indoor bowler.

== Biography ==
Espie represented the Northern Irish team at the 1978 Commonwealth Games in Edmonton, Canada, where he competed in the singles event.

Espie participated at the 1980 World Outdoor Bowls Championship for Ireland and four years later won the gold medal in the triples event with teammates Sammy Allen and Jim Baker at the 1984 World Outdoor Bowls Championship in Aberdeen.

Espie represented the Northern Irish team at the 1986 Commonwealth Games in Edinburgh, Scotland, where he competed in the singles event.

He was an insurance agent by trade and has won the Irish National championships indoors. He finished runner-up in the pairs at the 1974 Irish National Bowls Championships.
