= David Geddes =

David Geddes may refer to:

- David Geddes (cinematographer) (David A. Geddes, born 1949), Canadian cinematographer
- David Geddes (musician) (David Cole Idema, born 1950), American musician and singer
- David Geddes (badminton) Northern Irish badminton player

== See also ==
- David Geddis (born 1958), English footballer and football coach
