= Lawn bowls at the 1982 Commonwealth Games =

- Venue: Moorooka Bowls Club, Moorooka
- Location: Brisbane, Australia
- Dates: 30 September – 9 October 1982

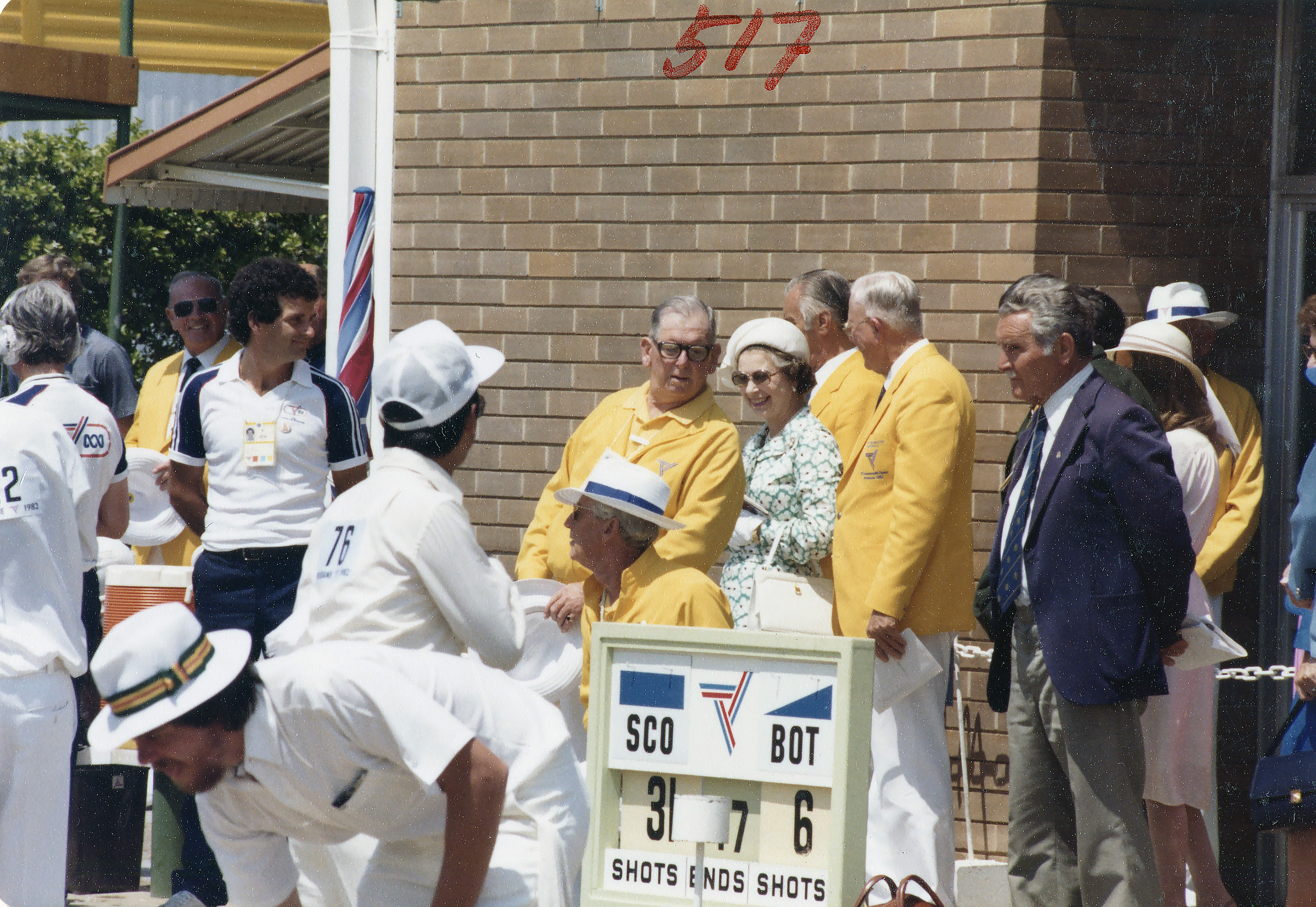
Queen Elizabeth I visits the bowling greens during competition

Lawn bowls at the 1982 Commonwealth Games was the 11th appearance of the Lawn bowls at the Commonwealth Games. Competition at the 1982 Commonwealth Games took place in Brisbane, Australia, from 30 September until 9 October 1982 at the Moorooka Bowls Club in Moorooka.

Scotland topped the lawn bowls medal table by virtue of winning two gold medals.

Willie Wood won the singles and Scotland doubled up in the pairs. Australia won the fours and Zimbabwe won the women's triples.

== Medal table ==
* Host nation (Australia)

Rank	Nation	Gold	Silver	Bronze	Total
1	Scotland	2	0	0	2
2	Australia*	1	1	1	3
3	Zimbabwe	1	0	0	1
4	New Zealand	0	2	1	3
5	Wales	0	1	0	1
6	England	0	0	1	1
6	Northern Ireland	0	0	1	1
Totals (7 entries)		4	4	4	12

== Medallists ==
Event	Gold	Silver	Bronze
Men's singles	(Scotland); Willie Wood	(Australia); Rob Parrella	(New Zealand); Peter Belliss
Men's pairs	(Scotland); John Watson; David Gourlay Sr.	(Wales); Lyn Perkins; Spencer Wilshire	(Australia); Denis Dalton; Peter Rheuben
Men's fours	(Australia); Rob Dobbins; Keith Poole; Bert Sharp; Don Sherman	(New Zealand); Rowan Brassey; Morgan Moffat; Danny O'Connor; Jim Scott	(Northern Ireland); Sammy Allen; Frank Campbell; Willie Watson; John McCloughlin
Women's triples	(Zimbabwe); Flo Kennedy; Anna Bates; Margaret Mills	(New Zealand); Pearl Dymond; Jennifer Simpson; Joyce Osborne	(England); Mavis Steele; Norma Shaw; Betty Stubbings

== Results ==
Scotland won the Singles and Pairs with Australia winning the Fours. The debut of women's competition was with a Triples tournament.

=== Men's singles – round robin ===
Pos	Player	P	W	L	F	A	Pts
1	(Scotland) Willie Wood	12	11	1	242	153	22
2	(Australia) Rob Parrella	12	10	2	240	129	20
3	(New Zealand) Peter Belliss	12	10	2	232	155	20
4	(Zimbabwe) Garin Beare	12	9	3	226	175	18
5	(Northern Ireland) David Corkill	12	8	4	212	191	16
6	(England) Alan Windsor	12	7	5	226	163	14
7	(Canada) Burnie Gill	12	6	6	214	186	12
8	(Fiji) Krishna Gaunder	12	5	7	175	220	10
9	(Zambia) Russell Hankey	12	4	8	180	231	8
10	(Eswatini) Tom Green	12	3	9	171	230	6
11	(Hong Kong) David Tso	12	2	10	176	245	4
12	(Papua New Guinea) Graham Croft	12	2	10	160	241	4
13	(Botswana) John Thackray	12	1	11	132	249	2

=== Men's pairs – round robin ===
Pos	Player	P	W	D	L	F	A	Pts
1	(Scotland) John Watson & David Gourlay Sr.	14	11	1	2	375	207	23
2	(Wales) Lyn Perkins & Spencer Wilshire	14	11	1	2	337	222	23
3	(Australia) Denis Dalton & Peter Rheuben	14	10	1	3	357	232	21
4	(England) Peter Line & Bill Hobart	14	10	0	4	335	242	20
5	(Northern Ireland) Billy McKelvey & Brendan McBrien	14	10	0	4	302	244	20
6	(New Zealand) Ian Dickison & Phil Skoglund	14	7	2	5	363	214	16
7	(Papua New Guinea) Alfred Daniel & Rolf Meyer	14	8	0	6	283	266	16
8	(Hong Kong) Chiu Shun Dang & George Souza Jr.	14	7	1	6	292	267	15
9	(Jersey) Marcel Coutouly & John Jones	14	5	2	7	264	309	12
10	(Zimbabwe) Pat O'Brien & Tony Schillaci	14	5	1	8	274	282	11
11	(Fiji) Caucau Turagabeci & Peter Fong	14	5	0	9	281	330	10
12	(Canada) Dave Duncalf & Dave Brown	14	5	0	9	256	330	10
13	(Botswana) Ron Anderson & Derek Rhodes	14	3	1	10	237	367	7
14	(Zambia) Duncan Naysmith & Tommy Powell	14	3	0	11	231	357	6
15	(Kenya) Jack Riley & Willie Watson	14	0	0	14	159	467	0

=== Men's fours – round robin ===
Pos	Player	P	W	D	L	F	A	Pts
1	(Australia) Rob Dobbins, Keith Poole, Bert Sharp, Don Sherman	13	12	0	1	311	195	24
2	(New Zealand) Rowan Brassey, Morgan Moffat, Danny O'Connor, Jim Scott	13	11	0	2	325	186	22
3	(Northern Ireland) Sammy Allen, Frank Campbell, Willie Watson, John McCloughlin	13	10	0	3	270	219	20
4	(Wales) Jim Morgan, Cliff Williams, Alun Thomas, Ray Williams	13	8	0	5	254	251	16
5	(Scotland) Alex McIntosh, John Harper, Brian Rattray, Jock Fleming	13	7	1	5	268	248	15
6	(Canada) Ronnie Jones, Bill Watkins, Glen Patton, Barrie McFadden	13	7	1	5	251	249	15
7	(Zimbabwe) Allan Bernstein, Kenneth Redman, Harry Bishop, Bill Cumming	13	7	0	6	279	237	14
8	(England) Jimmy Hobday, Tommy Armstrong, George Turley, Len Bowden	13	6	1	6	262	252	13
9	(Papua New Guinea)	13	6	0	7	278	250	12
10	(Fiji)	13	5	0	8	248	255	10
11	(Hong Kong)	13	5	0	8	239	273	10
12	(Botswana) Jim Cushnahan	13	3	1	9	242	281	7
13	(Zambia)	13	1	1	11	170	330	3
14	(Eswatini)	13	0	1	12	181	334	1

=== Women's triples – round robin ===
Pos	Player	P	W	D	L	F	A	Pts
1	(Zimbabwe) Flo Kennedy, Anna Bates & Margaret Mills	15	13	0	2	327	211	26
2	(New Zealand) Pearl Dymond, Jennifer Simpson, Joyce Osborne	15	11	0	4	311	206	22
3	(England) Mavis Steele, Norma Shaw, Betty Stubbings	15	10	2	3	306	206	22
4	(Australia) Rosemary O'Brien, Eva Wilcher, Patricia Smith	15	11	0	4	308	217	22
5	(Zambia) Hilda Hall, Ann Meir, Sylvia Keeling	15	9	2	4	270	226	20
6	(Northern Ireland) Eileen Bell, Nan Allely, Daisy Fraser	15	9	2	4	270	242	20
7	(Hong Kong) Linda King, Sarah Rae O'Donnell, Merle Walker	15	9	0	6	268	259	18
8	(Zambia) Babs Anderson, Evelyn Thomas, Yvonne Richards	15	7	0	6	254	252	14
9	(Wales) Margaret Pomeroy, Janet Ackland, Gillian Miles	15	6	0	9	276	247	12
10	(Eswatini) Liz James, Evelyn Gibbs, Anne Green	15	5	1	9	249	309	11
11	(Scotland) Jessie Adamson, Janet Menzies, Jessie Lawson	15	5	0	10	249	292	10
12	(Papua New Guinea) Carmel King, Betty Dunbavan, Maggie Worri	15	5	0	10	243	294	10
13	(Samoa) Asenati Vaeau, Vaiee Siaosi, Hilda Heather	15	5	0	10	197	277	10
14	(Fiji) Filo O'Meagher, Maraia Lum On, Teresa Hughes	15	4	1	10	250	264	9
15	(Canada) Debbie Ballam, Alice Duncalf, Agnes Bowlby	15	4	0	11	222	290	8
16	(Kenya) Mavis Cattermole, Alice Mayers, Jean Haggerty	15	3	0	12	165	343	6

== See also ==
- List of Commonwealth Games medallists in lawn bowls
- Lawn bowls at the Commonwealth Games
