= Bert Sharp =

Australian lawn bowler (born 1926)

Personal information
- Nationality: Australian
- Born: 29 July 1926
Medal record
Representing Australia
Commonwealth Games
| Gold medal – first place | 1982 Brisbane | fours |

Herbert Sharp (born 29 July 1926, date of death unknown) was an Australian international lawn bowler.

Sharp represented Australia at the 1982 Commonwealth Games and won a gold medal in the fours at the 1982 Commonwealth Games in Brisbane with Keith Poole, Rob Dobbins and Don Sherman.

In 2022, Sharp was inducted into Bowls Australia's Hall of Fame. At the time it was noted that he was deceased.
