= Frank Campbell (bowls) =

Northern Irish international lawn bowler

Personal information
- Nationality: British (Northern Irish)

Sport
- Sport: Lawn and indoor bowls
- Club: Carrickfergus BC
Medal record
Representing Northern Ireland
Commonwealth Games
Bronze medal – third place	1982 Brisbane	men's fours

Frank Campbell is an Irish international lawn bowls player.

== Biography ==
Campbell was a member of the Carrickfergus Bowls Club.

Campbell represented the Northern Irish team at the 1982 Commonwealth Games in Brisbane, Australia, where he competed in the fours event.

The team consisting of Campbell, Sammy Allen, Willie Watson and John McCloughlin won a bronze medal.

He was the pairs runner-up at the 1980 Irish National Bowls Championships.
