= Leslie Dewart (badminton) =

Northern Irish international badminton player

Personal information
- Nationality: British (Northern Irish)
- Born: c.1971 Lisburn, Northern Ireland

Sport
- Sport: Badminton
- Club: Cavehill BC

William Leslie Dewart (born c.1971), is a former international badminton player from Northern Ireland who competed at the Commonwealth Games.

== Biography ==
Dewart was born in Lisburn, Northern Ireland but moved to Dumfries in Scotland at the age of nine. He began playing badminton in Royal Hillsborough and in 1987, when based in Craigs Loaning, Dumfries, he won the Scottish U14 title. In 1993 he was called up to play for Scotland at international age levels.

In 1997 he had moved back to Ireland and married Alison Hilary from Donaghcloney, and decided to switch allegiance to play for Ireland, which he was able to do because of his birthplace.

Dewart was a member of the Cavehill Badminton Club, represented Ulster at provincial level and the all-Ireland team at international level, making his debut in April 1998. He was proficient in doubles play and partners Gillian Haldane in mixed doubles.

He represented the 1998 Northern Irish team at the 1998 Commonwealth Games in Kuala Lumpur, Malaysia, where he competed in badminton tournament.

In 2002, he was chosen as the coach for the Northern Ireland badminton team for the 2002 Commonwealth Games in Manchester. In 2005 he was the Ulster badminton development officer.

In 2021 he was the Irish national para-coach and coached at the National Badminton Centre.
