= 1984 World Outdoor Bowls Championship =

Lawn bowls competition

Men's World Outdoor Championships 1984
- 5th Men's World Outdoor Bowls Championships
- Location: Aberdeen, Scotland
- Date: 11–28 July 1984
- Category: World Bowls Championship

The 1984 Men's World Outdoor Bowls Championship was held at Westburn Park in Aberdeen, Scotland, from 11 to 28 July 1984.

Peter Belliss won the singles defeating Willie Wood in the final. Wood qualified for the final because he finished with a seven-shot advantage in section A over David Bryant despite identical records of winning nine rounds each.

United States won the pairs, Ireland won the triples and England won the fours. The Leonard Trophy went to Scotland.

== Medallists ==
Event	Gold	Silver	Bronze
Men's singles	(New Zealand); Peter Belliss	(Scotland); Willie Wood	(England); David Bryant
Men's pairs	(United States); George Adrain+ Jim Candelet; Skippy Arculli	(England); David Bryant; Tony Allcock	(Australia); Kenny Williams; Bob Middleton
Men's triples	Stan Espie; Sammy Allen; Jim Baker	(Scotland); Brian Rattray; Doug Lambert; Jim Boyle	(New Zealand); Rowan Brassey; Morgan Moffat; Jim Scott
Men's fours	(England); George Turley; John Bell; Julian Haines; Tony Allcock	(New Zealand); Rowan Brassey; Jim Scott; Morgan Moffat; Phil Skoglund	(Scotland); Brian Rattray; Doug Lambert; Jim Boyle; David Gourlay Sr.
Men's Team	Scotland	New Zealand	England

== Results ==
=== Men's singles – round robin ===
Section A

Pos	Player	P	W	D	L	F	A	Pts	Shots
1	(Scotland) Willie Wood	10	9	0	1	207	146	18	+61
2	(England) David Bryant	10	9	0	1	207	153	18	+54
3	(Israel) Cecil Bransky	10	7	0	3	202	134	14	+68
4	(Canada) Ronnie Jones	10	6	0	4	194	158	12	+36
5	(Wales) Spencer Wilshire	10	6	0	4	190	164	12	+26
6	David Corkill	10	5	0	5	189	162	10	+27
7	(United States) Neil McInnes	10	4	0	6	164	172	8	-8
8	(Fiji) Shaun Patton	10	4	0	6	158	193	8	-35
9	(Botswana) Johnny Kakakis	10	3	0	7	153	204	6	-51
10	(Eswatini) David Thomson	10	1	0	9	121	208	2	-87
11	(Kenya) James Haggerty	10	1	0	9	110	201	2	-91

Section B

Pos	Player	P	W	D	L	F	A	Pts	Shots
1	(New Zealand) Peter Belliss	10	9	0	1	206	135	18	+71
2	(Australia) Kenny Williams	10	9	0	1	196	139	18	+57
3	(Zambia) Daniel Coetzee	10	7	0	3	189	143	14	+46
4	(Zimbabwe) Garin Beare	10	6	0	4	179	138	12	+41
5	(Guernsey) Mike Nicolle	10	5	0	5	179	155	10	+24
6	(Hong Kong) George Souza Jr.	10	5	0	5	158	145	10	+13
7	(Jersey) John Jones	10	4	0	6	142	162	8	-20
8	(Malawi) Bill Haining	10	4	0	6	157	179	8	-22
9	(Samoa) Felavi Petana	10	2	0	8	146	196	4	-50
10	(Argentina) Julian Dannevig	10	2	0	8	128	189	4	-61
11	(Papua New Guinea) Graham Croft	10	1	0	9	102	201	2	-99

Bronze medal match

Bryant beat Williams 21–14.

Gold medal match

Belliss beat Wood 21–20.

=== Men's pairs – round robin ===
Section A

Pos	Player	P	W	D	L	F	A	Pts	Shots
1	(United States) George Adrain+, Jim Candelet & Skippy Arculli	10	9	0	1			18	+76
2	(Australia) Kenny Williams & Bob Middleton	10	8	0	2	258	139	16	+119
3	(Scotland) Willie Wood & David Gourlay Sr.	10	7	0	3	197	159	14	+38
4	(New Zealand) Peter Belliss & Phil Skoglund	10	6	1	3	222	170	13	+52
5	(Wales) Spencer Wilshire & John Anstey	10	6	0	4			12	
6	(Zambia) Russell Hankey & Daniel Coetzee	10	4	0	6			8	
7	(Papua New Guinea) Graham Croft & Laka Rawali	10	4	0	6			8	
8	(Botswana) Johnny Kakakis & Ron Anderson	10	4	0	6	166	225	8	-59
9	(Samoa) Ioapo Iosia & Falevi Petana	10	3	0	7	168	248	6	-80
10	(Eswatini) John Kemp & David Thomson	10	2	0	8	152	241	4	-89
11	(Kenya) Peter Jeens & William Watson	10	1	1	8	161	215	3	-54

+ injury replacement Section B

Pos	Player	P	W	D	L	F	A	Pts	Shots
1	(England) David Bryant & Tony Allcock	10	9	0	1	226	151	18	+75
2	David Corkill & Tom Kennedy	10	8	0	2			16	
3	(Canada) Ronnie Jones & Bill Boettger	10	7	0	3	222	159	14	+63
4	(Israel) Cecil Bransky & Cecil Cooper	10	6	0	4			12	
5	(Zimbabwe) Garin Beare & Trevor Vincent	10	5	0	5	205	179	10	+26
6	(Malawi) Bill Haining & David Broad	10	5	0	5	186	195	10	-9
7	(Guernsey) Bill Crawford & Mike Nicolle	10	4	0	6			8	
8	(Fiji) George Thaggard & Peter Fong	10	3	1	6			7	
9	(Hong Kong) M B Hassan Jr. & Omar Dallah	10	3	0	7			6	
10	(Jersey) John Jones & Arthur McKernan	10	2	0	8			4	
11	(Argentina) Carlos Gonzales & Clemente Bausili	10	1	1	8	166	241	3	-75

Bronze medal match

Australia beat Ireland 26–14.

Gold medal match

United States beat England 21–20.

=== Men's triples – round robin ===
Section A

Pos	Player	P	W	D	L	F	A	Pts	Shots
1	Stan Espie, Sammy Allen & Jim Baker	10	10	0	0			20	
2	(New Zealand) Rowan Brassey, Morgan Moffat & Jim Scott	10	8	0	2	208	131	16	+77
3	(Australia) Peter Rheuben, Don Sherman & Keith Poole	10	7	1	2			15	
4	(Zimbabwe) Allan Bernstein, Jack Shiel & Manie Vollgraaff	10	5	0	5	180	168	10	+12
5	(England) George Turley, John Bell & Julian Haines	10	4	1	5	181	157	9	+24
6	(Israel) Nathan Lazarus, Jack Trappler & Sam Skudowitz	10	4	0	6	134	169	8	-35
7	(Canada) Dave Houtby, Glen Patton & Barry McFadden	10	3	1	6	158	154	7	+4
8	(Wales) Robert Weale, Danny Price & Brin Hawkins	10	3	1	6			7	
9	(Papua New Guinea) Lawrence Tamarua, Rolf Meyer & Tau Nancie	10	3	1	6			7	
10	(Guernsey) Cyril Smith, Clarry Blondel & Derek Hurford	10	3	1	6	151	190	7	-39
11	(Samoa) Maurice Fenn, Jack Ah Loo & Sioane Lino	10	1	0	9	106	255	2	-149

Section B

Pos	Player	P	W	D	L	F	A	Pts	Shots
1	(Scotland) Brian Rattray, Doug Lambert & Jim Boyle	10	10	0	0	240	113	20	+127
2	(Hong Kong) Philip Chok, Edwin Chok & George Souza Jr.	10	6	0	4			12	+33
3	(Zambia) Tommy Powell, Duncan Naysmith & Japie Van Deventer	10	6	0	4			12	+27
4	(United States) Orville Artist, Bert McWilliams & Neil McInnes	10	5	1	4	176	162	11	+14
5	(Jersey) David Le Marquand, Ken Lowery & Tim Mallett	10	5	0	5			10	
6	(Eswatini) Tom Sheasby, Richard Cockram & Derek James	10	5	0	5			10	
7	(Fiji) Javomani Naidu, Geoff O'Meagher & Shaun Patton	10	4	1	5	174	163	9	+11
8	(Botswana) Ray Mascarenhas, Bill Haresnape & Albert Noel	10	4	0	6	161	168	8	-7
9	(Malawi) John Chalmers, Peter Crossan & Sandy Ross	10	3	0	7	156	185	6	-29
10	(Kenya) James Haggerty, C Radbone & Brian Jennings	10	3	0	7	132	202	6	-70
11	(Argentina) Julian Dannevig, Enrri Merli & Albert Geddes	10	3	0	7	139	211	6	-72

Bronze medal match

New Zealand beat Hong Kong 27–8.

Gold medal match

Ireland beat Scotland 29–11.

=== Men's fours – round robin ===
Section A

Pos	Player	P	W	D	L	F	A	Pts	Shots
1	(New Zealand) Rowan Brassey, Jim Scott, Morgan Moffat & Phil Skoglund	10	7	1	2	228	153	15	+75
2	(Hong Kong) Philip Chok, Edwin Chok, Omar Dallah & M B Hassan Jr.	10	7	1	2	202	167	15	+35
3	Stan Espie, Sammy Allen, Jim Baker & Tom Kennedy	10	7	0	3	208	156	14	+52
4	(Zimbabwe) Allan Bernstein, Jack Shiel, Trevor Vincent & Manie Vollgraaff	10	6	0	4	195	176	12	+19
5	(Wales) Robert Weale, Danny Price, John Anstey & Brin Hawkins	10	5	0	5	215	165	10	+50
6	(Eswatini) Tom Sheasby, John Kemp, Richard Cockram & Derek James	10	5	0	5	182	175	8	+7
7	(Israel) Cecil Cooper, Nathan Lazarus, Jack Trappler & Sam Skudowitz	10	4	1	5	177	190	9	-13
8	(Guernsey) Bill Crawford, Cyril Smith, Clarry Blondel & Derek Hurford	10	4	0	6	168	193	8	-25
9	(Papua New Guinea) Laka Rawali, Lawrence Tamarua, Rolf Meyer & Tau Nancie	10	3	1	6	172	218	7	-46
10	(United States) Orville Artist, Bert McWilliams, Ian Beattie & Skippy Arculli	10	3	0	7	167	221	6	-54
11	(Kenya) Peter Jeens, C Radbone, William Watson & Brian Jennings	10	2	0	8	153	253	4	-100

Section B

Pos	Player	P	W	D	L	F	A	Pts	Shots
1	(England) George Turley, John Bell, Julian Haines & Tony Allcock	10	9	0	1	270	139	18	+131
2	(Scotland) Brian Rattray, Doug Lambert, Jim Boyle, David Gourlay Sr.	10	8	0	2	257	157	16	+100
3	(Australia) Bob Middleton, Peter Rheuben, Don Sherman & Keith Poole	10	8	0	2	215	168	16	+47
4	(Jersey) David Le Marquand, Ken Lowery, Arthur McKernan & Tim Mallett	10	7	0	3	239	175	14	+64
5	(Canada) Dave Houtby, Glen Patton, Barry McFadden & Bill Boettger	10	5	0	5	203	200	10	+3
6	(Zambia) Tommy Powell, Russell Hankey, Duncan Naysmith & Japie Van Deventer	10	4	0	6	182	125	8	-43
7	(Malawi) John Chalmers, Peter Crossan, Sandy Ross & David Broad	10	3	0	7	163	210	6	-47
8	(Fiji) Javomani Naidu, George Thaggard, Geoff O'Meagher & Peter Fong	10	3	0	7	177	206	6	-29
9	(Argentina) Carlos Gonzales, Enrri Merli, Clemente Bausili & Dennis Watson	10	3	0	7	165	213	6	-48
10	(Samoa) Maurice Fenn, Jack Ah Loo, Ioapa Iosia & Sioane Lino	10	3	0	7	161	256	6	-95
11	(Botswana) Ray Mascarenhas, Bill Haresnape, Ron Anderson & Albert Noel	10	2	0	8	156	239	4	-83

Bronze medal match

Scotland beat Hong Kong 30–15.

Gold medal match

England beat New Zealand 18–17.

=== W.M.Leonard Trophy ===
Pos	Team	Singles	Pairs	Triples	Fours	Total
1	Scotland	21	18	21	20	80
2	New Zealand	22	16	20	21	79
3	England	20	21	15	22	78
4	Australia	19	20	18	17	74
5	Ireland	14	19	22	18	63
6	Zimbabwe	16	13	15	15	59
7	Canada	15	17	12	15	59
8	Zambia	18	11	17	12	58
9	Hong Kong	11	6	19	19	56
10	United States	12	22	16	3	53
11	Israel	17	15	9	10	51
12	Wales	9	15	8	13	45
13	Jersey	10	3	13	16	42
14	Guernsey	13	9	4	8	34
15	Fiji	7	7	10	9	33
16	Malawi	8	12	6	7	33
17	(Eswatini) Swaziland	4	4	11	11	30
18	Botswana	6	8	7	3	24
19	Papua New Guinea	2	10	5	5	22
20	Western Samoa	5	5	3	4	17
21	Argentina	3	3	1	6	13
22	Kenya	1	1	3	1	6
