= Rob Dobbins =

Australian lawn bowler and coach (1940–2026)

Personal information
- Nationality: Australian
- Born: 10 October 1940 Newcastle, New South Wales
- Died: August/September 2026 (aged 85)
Medal record
Representing Australia
Commonwealth Games
Gold medal – first place	1982 Brisbane	fours

Robert Dobbins (1940 – 2026) was an Australian international lawn bowler and coach.

== Bowls career ==
In 1981, Dobbins won the inaugural pairs title at the Hong Kong International Bowls Classic; he and his partner Darby Ross defeated England's Jimmy Hobday and Tony Allcock.

Dobbins represented Australia at the 1982 Commonwealth Games and won a gold medal in the fours at the 1982 Commonwealth Games in Brisbane with Keith Poole, Bert Sharp and Don Sherman.

He coached the Australian team at the 2002 Commonwealth Games. His coaching journey took him to Canada, Thailand, Scotland and Fiji.

He was inducted into the Bowls Australia Hall of Fame in 2013.

Dobbins died in August/September 2026.
