= Northern Ireland at the 1982 Commonwealth Games =

- CG code: NIR
- CGA: Northern Ireland Commonwealth Games Council
- Website: nicgc.org

in Brisbane, Australia
- Flag bearers: Opening: Closing:
- Medals Ranked 17th: Gold 0 Silver 3 Bronze 3 Total 6

Commonwealth Games appearances (overview)
- 1934; 1938; 1950; 1954; 1958; 1962; 1966; 1970; 1974; 1978; 1982; 1986; 1990; 1994; 1998; 2002; 2006; 2010; 2014; 2018; 2022; 2026; 2030

Other related appearances
- Ireland (1930)

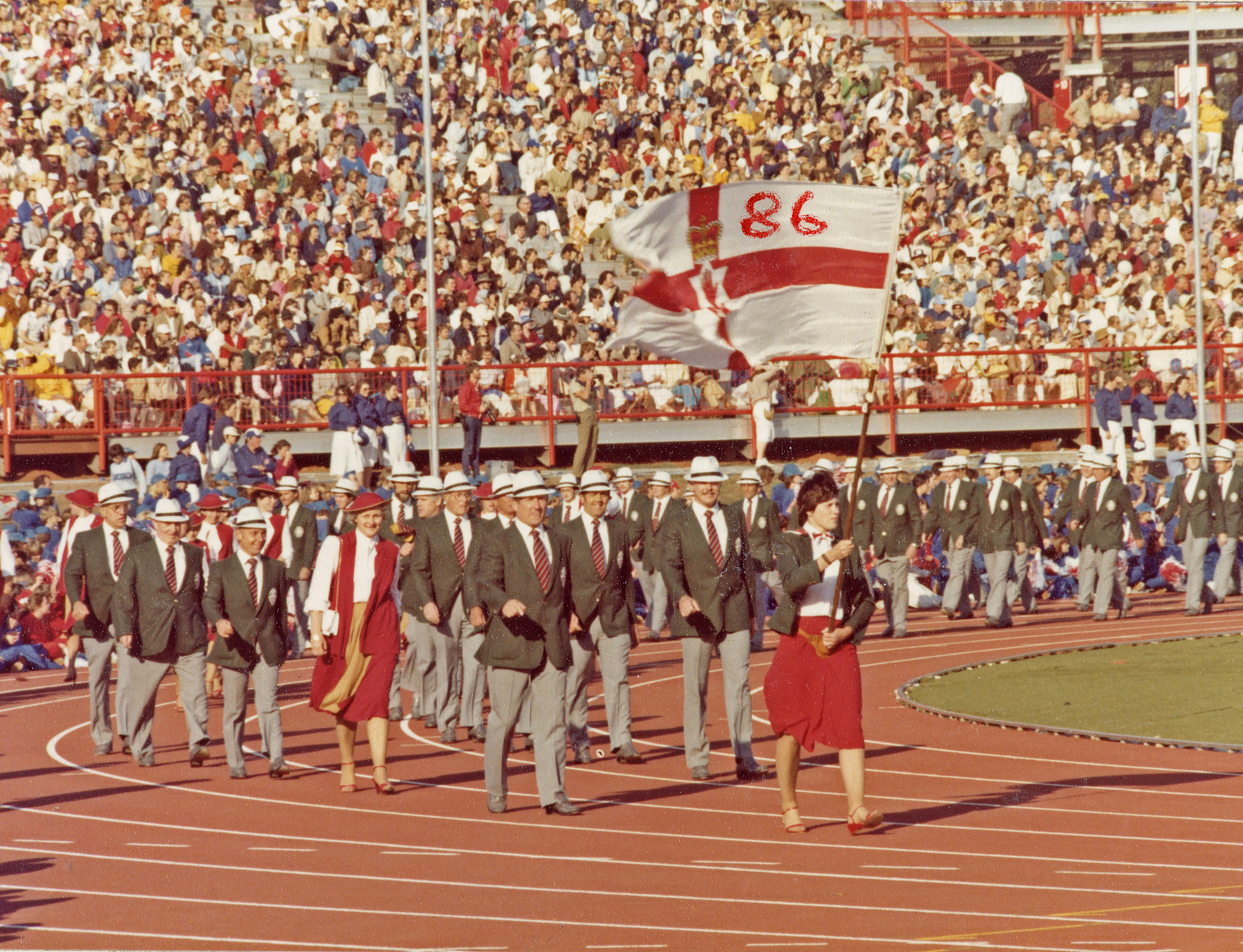
The Northern Irish team at the opening ceremony in Brisbane, 1982

Northern Ireland competed at the 1982 Commonwealth Games in Brisbane, Australia, from 30 September to 9 October 1982.

Northern Ireland finished 17th in the medal table with three silver medals and three bronze medals.

The Northern Irish team was named on 6 July 1982 and consisted of 58 athletes and 15 officials.

== Medalists ==
=== Silver ===
- Martin Girvan (hammer throw)
- Roy Webb (boxing)
- Janet Yates (archery)

=== Bronze ===
- Tom Corr (boxing)
- Men's fours/rinks (lawn bowls)
- Mixed Full Bore Rifle Pairs (shooting)

== Team ==
=== Officials ===
- Dick McColgan - General team amanager
- Billy Stewart - Assistant team manager
- Robin Harland - Doctor
- Tom Jock Gilmour - Masseur
- Chaperone - Maureen Cowdy
- Transport officer - Eddie Thompson
- Brian Crowther - Archery manager
- Joe Kinkead - Badminton manager
- Gerry Storey - Boxing manager
- Billy Burrows - Lawn bowls manager
- Morris Foster - Cycling manager
- Harry MacGiffin - Shooting manager
- Bobby Madine - Swimming manager
- David Finlay - Wrestling manager

=== Archery ===
Men

Athlete	Events	Club	Medals
Eddie Graham	individual		

Women

Athlete	Events	Club	Medals
Freda Britton	individual		
Angela Goodall	individual		
Janet Yates	individual		Silver medal

=== Athletics ===
Men

Athlete	Events	Club	Medals
Phil Beattie	400m hurdles		
Colin Boreham	decathlon		
Martin Girvan	hammer		Silver medal
Greg Hannon	marathon		
Sean O'Neill	800m		

Women

Athlete	Events	Club	Medals
Sharon McPeake	high jump, long jump		
Judith Robinson	100m hurdles		

=== Badminton ===
Men

Athlete	Events	Club	Medals
Peter Ferguson	singles, doubles, mixed, team	Alpha BC, Lisburn	
Clifford McIlwaine	mixed, team	Holy Trinity BC	
Bill Thompson	singles, doubles, mixed, team	Alpha BC, Lisburn	

Women

Athlete	Events	Club	Medals
Linda Andrews	singles, mixed, team	Alpha BC, Lisburn	
Ann Crossan	singles, doubles, mixed, team	Alpha BC, Lisburn	
Diane Underwood	singles, doubles, mixed, team	St. Jude's BC	

=== Boxing ===
Men only

Athlete	Events	Club	Medals
Ken Beattie	67kg welterweight		
Tom Corr	71kg light-middleweight		Bronze medal
Gerry Duddy	51kg flyweight		
Gary Duff	57kg featherweight		
Gerry Hawkins	-48kg light-flyweight		
Davy Irving	63.5kg light-welterweight		
Roy Webb	54kg bantamweight		Silver medal

=== Cycling ===
Athlete	Events	Club	Medals
Séamus Downey	road race		
David Gardiner	road race, road TTT, pursuit TTT		
Alastair Irvine	scratch, road TTT, pursuit TTT		
Billy Kerr	road race, road TTT		
Len Kirk	road race, road TTT, scratch, pursuit TTT		
Gordon Scott	scratch, time trial, pursuit TTT		

=== Lawn bowls ===
Men

Athlete	Events	Club	Medals
Sammy Allen	fours/rinks	Ballymena BC	Silver medal
Frank Campbell	fours/rinks	Carrickfergus BC	Silver medal
David Corkill	singles	Knock BC	
Brendan McBrien	pairs	Falls BC	
John McCloughlin	fours/rinks	Lisnagarvey BC	Silver medal
Billy McKelvey	pairs	Falls BC	
Willie Watson	fours/rinks	Knock BC	Silver medal

Women

Athlete	Events	Club	Medals
Nan Allely	triples	Donaghadee BC	
Eileen Bell	triples	Belfast BC	
Daisy Fraser	triples	Donaghadee BC	

=== Shooting ===
Men

Athlete	Events	Medals
David Calvert	Fullbore rifle, fullbore rifle pairs	Bronze medal
Roy McGowan	trap	
Cliff Ogle	50m rifle prone, pair	
Ken Stanford	air, free, centre, rapid pistol	
Trevor West	skeet, skeet pair	
Adrian Willis	skeet, skeet pair	

Women

Athlete	Events	Medals
Hazel Mackintosh	Fullbore rifle, fullbore fifle pairs	Bronze medal

=== Swimming ===
Men

Athlete	Events	Club	Medals
Willie Johnston	100m butterfly, 100m freestyle, 200 medley		
Simon Magowan	100, 200m backstroke, 100 butterfly, 200 medley		
Ashley Morrison	100, 200 butterfly, 200 medley		

Women

Athlete	Events	Club	Medals
Julie Parkes	100m butterfly, 100, 200m freestyle, 200 medley		
Moya Sloane	100, 200m freestyle		

=== Weightlifting ===
Athlete	Events	Club	Medals
Don Coates	82.5kg light-heavyweight		
Terry McGibbon	60kg featherweight		

=== Wrestling ===
Athlete	Events	Club	Medals
Ivan Weir	90kg light-heavyweight		
