= Kenny Williams (bowls) =

Personal information
- Nationality: Australian
- Died: 2012
Medal record
Representing Australia
World Outdoor Championships
Bronze medal – third place	1984 Aberdeen	Men's pairs
Asia Pacific Bowls Championships
Gold medal – first place	1987 Lae	singles
Gold medal – first place	1987 Lae	triples
Gold medal – first place	1989 Suva	triples
Gold medal – first place	1989 Suva	fours

Kenny Williams (date of birth unknown - 2012) was an Australian international lawn and indoor bowler.

== Bowls career ==
Williams won a bronze medal in the 1984 World Outdoor Championships in Aberdeen with bowls partner Bob Middleton. He played for Culburra Bowls Club in New South Wales.

He won four medals at the Asia Pacific Bowls Championships, all four medals were gold medals in the 1987 singles and triples, in Lae, Papua New Guinea and the 1989 tripels and fours in Suva, Fiji.

Williams who died in 1992 was posthumously inducted into the Australian Hall of Fame.
