= Bob Crossan =

Northern Irish athlete

Personal information
- Nationality: British (Northern Irish)

Sport
- Sport: Athletics
- Event: Long-distance / marathon
- Club: Duncairn Harriers; Liverpool Pembroke AC

Robert Crossan is a former athlete from Northern Ireland, who represented Northern Ireland at the British Empire Games (now Commonwealth Games).

== Biography ==
Crossan was a member of the Duncairn Harriers and was the Northern Ireland champion over the marathon distance on several occasions.

He represented the 1954 Northern Irish Team at the 1954 British Empire and Commonwealth Games in Vancouver, Canada, participating in the marathon event, where he finished in sixth place.

After the games he was given a civic reception by the Lord and Mayor and Lady Mayoress at the Belfast City Hall. At the 1956 Northern Ireland Championships he won the marathon title.

Crossan joined the Liverpool Pembroke Athletic Club in 1958 but retained his involvement with Duncairn Harriers. One-year later he was the 1959 Irish marathon champion.
