= John Clarke (pole vaulter) =

Northern Irish athlete

Personal information
- Nationality: British (Northern Irish)
- Born: c.1911 Belfast, Northern Ireland

Sport
- Sport: Athletics
- Event(s): Pole vault, javelin, decathlon
- Club: Royal Ulster Constabulary

John James Stuart Clarke (c.1911 – date of death unknown) was a Northern Irish athlete who competed in the 1938 British Empire Games.

== Biography ==
Clarke was an all-round athlete competing in the pole vault, javelin and decathlon as a member of the athletic club of the Royal Ulster Constabulary and finished second in the 1936 Ulster pole vault championship. The following year he won the pole vault title at the same championships.

Clarke was one of only four athletes to represent Northern Ireland at the 1938 British Empire Games, partly due to a time of political change that saw the Irish Free State recently becoming Ireland. He took part in the athletics programme and specifically in the pole vault competition and the javelin throw event. At the times of the Games he was a constable with the Royal Ulster Constabulary and lived at 32 Ophir Gardens, Belfast.

After returning from the Games, Clarke participated in decathlon contests and retained his Ulster Pole vault title.

During World War II, Clarke was twice a champion of Ireland, in the javelin in 1943 and 1944 at the Irish Athletics Championships.
