= Northern Ireland at the 1954 British Empire and Commonwealth Games =

- CGF code: NIR
- CGA: Northern Ireland Commonwealth Games Council
- Website: nicgc.org

in Vancouver, Canada
- Medals Ranked 9th: Gold 2 Silver 1 Bronze 0 Total 3

British Empire and Commonwealth Games appearances
- 1934; 1938; 1950; 1954; 1958; 1962; 1966; 1970; 1974; 1978; 1982; 1986; 1990; 1994; 1998; 2002; 2006; 2010; 2014; 2018; 2022; 2026; 2030

Other related appearances
- Ireland (1930)

Northern Ireland at the 1954 British Empire and Commonwealth Games (abbreviated NIR) was the third time that the nation had participated at the Games following appearances in 1934 and 1938.

The Games were held in Vancouver, Canada, from 30 July to 7 August 1954. Northern Ireland finished 9th in the medal table with two gold medals and one silver medal.

The team manager was Mr T. Ferguson, the Northern Ireland AAA secretary.

== Medals ==
=== Gold ===
- Men's pairs team, Lawn bowls
- Thelma Hopkins, Athletics

=== Silver ===
- Thelma Hopkins, Athletics

== Team ==
=== Athletics ===
Men

Athlete	Events	Club	Medals
Bob Crossan	Marathon	Duncairn Harriers	
Kevin Flanagan	Javelin throw, Shot put	Royal Ulster Constabulary	
Jack Lally	Discus throw, Hammer throw	Albert Foundry AC	
Victor Milligan	880y, 1 mile	Instonians	

Women

Athlete	Events	Club	Medals
Thelma Hopkins	High jump, long jump, 80m hurdles, javelin	Short & Harland	,

=== Lawn Bowls ===
Athlete	Events	Club	Medals
William Rosbotham	pairs	Belfast	Gold medal
Percy Watson	pairs	Co.Antrim	Gold medal

=== Swimming ===
Men

Athlete	Events	Club	Medals
Billy Devlin	110y backstroke, relay	East End, Belfast	
David Fletcher	220 Yard breaststroke, relay	Victoria SC, Belfast	
Derek Laverty	440y, 1650y freestyle, relay	Ocean Falls SC, Canada	

Women

Athlete	Events	Club	Medals
Jennifer Osborough	110y, 440y freestyle	Victoria SC, Belfast	
