= Alex McIntosh (bowls) =

Scottish lawn and indoor bowler (1936-2008)

Personal information
- Nationality: British (Scottish)
- Born: 24 May 1936
- Died: 16 August 2008 (aged 72)

Sport
- Sport: Lawn and indoor bowls
- Club: Newbattle BC; Midlothian IBC
Medal record
Representing Scotland
World Outdoor Championships
Silver medal – second place	1972 Worthing	fours
Gold medal – first place	1972 Worthing	team
Silver medal – second place	1980 Melbourne	fours
Bronze medal – third place	1980 Melbourne	team
Silver medal – second place	1988 Auckland	triples
Bronze medal – third place	1988 Auckland	team
Commonwealth Games
Silver medal – second place	1970 Edinburgh	fours
Gold medal – first place	1974 Christchurch	pairs
Silver medal – second place	1978 Edmonton	pairs

Alex McIntosh (24 May 1936 – 16 August 2008) was a Scottish international lawn and indoor bowler who won a gold medal at the Commonwealth Games and the world championships.

== Bowls career ==
=== World Championships ===
At the 1972 World Outdoor Bowls Championship in Worthing McIntosh won a silver medal in the fours and a gold medal in the team event (Leonard Trophy). Eight years later he won two more medals when winning silver in the fours and a bronze in the team event at the 1980 World Outdoor Bowls Championship in Melbourne.

=== Commonwealth Games ===
McIntosh won three Commonwealth Games medals; a silver in the 1970 Fours, gold medal in the 1974 Pairs and silver in the 1978 Pairs. McIntosh was the standard bearer at the 1978 Commonwealth Games in Edmonton.

He represented the Scottish team at the 1982 Commonwealth Games in Brisbane, Australia, where he competed in the fours event, with John Fleming, Brian Rattray and John Harper, finishing in fifth place.

=== National ===
McIntosh began bowling in 1955 and won his first international cap in 1962. His indoor club was Midlothian and outdoor club was Newbattle. He earned a total of 54 caps.

He won the 1968 fours title and two pairs titles (1973 & 1985) at the Scottish National Bowls Championships when bowling for the Newbattle Bowls Club.

== Personal life ==
He was nicknamed "Big Tosh" and was an engineer at Lady Victoria Colliery. He was educated at Newtongrange Primary School and Newbattle Secondary. McIntosh died on 16 August 2008 aged 72.
