= Len Bowden =

English lawn bowler

Personal information
- Nationality: British (English)
- Born: Q4, 1938 Plymouth, England

Sport
- Sport: Lawn bowls
- Club: Torquay BC

Leonard F. Bowden (born 1938) is a former English international lawn bowler.

== Bowls career ==
Bowden was an England international and captained his country in 1980.

He represented England in the fours, at the 1982 Commonwealth Games in Brisbane, Australia.

Four years later he was selected for England, again in the fours, at the 1986 Commonwealth Games in Edinburgh, Scotland.
