= John Fleming (bowls) =

Scottish international lawn bowler

Personal information
- Nationality: British (Scottish)

Sport
- Club: Mauchline BC, East Ayrshire
Medal record
Representing Scotland
National Championships
Gold medal – first place	1974	singles

John Fleming, also known as Jock Fleming, is a former international lawn and indoor bowler from Scotland who competed at the Commonwealth Games.

== Biography ==
Fleming was a member of the Mauchline Bowls Club in East Ayrshire. He was the singles champion of Scotland at the 1974 Scottish National Bowls Championships.

In 1977, he was called up by Scotland for the Worthing internationals and played for Scotland in the Australian World Classic Pairs event in December 1977.

He subsequently represented the Scottish team at the 1978 Commonwealth Games in Edmonton, Canada, where he competed in the fours event with Doug Copland, Dick Bernard and Willie Adrain. The team finished in fifth place.

Fleming represented the Scottish team again at the 1982 Commonwealth Games in Brisbane, Australia, where he competed in the fours event with Alex McIntosh, Brian Rattray and John Harper, finishing in fifth place.
