= Jennie Simpson (bowls) =

New Zealand bowls player

Personal information
- Nationality: New Zealander
Medal record
Representing New Zealand
Commonwealth Games
Silver medal – second place	1982 Brisbane	triples
Asia Pacific Bowls Championships
Silver medal – second place	1987 Lae	fours

Jennifer Simpson is a lawn bowls international player from New Zealand, who represented New Zealand at two Commonwealth Games.

== Bowls career ==
Simpson played in the team that won the silver medal in the triples event with Pearl Dymond and Joyce Osborne at the 1982 Commonwealth Games. Four years later she represented New Zealand again at the Lawn bowls at the 1986 Commonwealth Games.

She won a silver medal at the Asia Pacific Bowls Championships in 1987.

== Personal life ==
Her daughter Debbie White won the New Zealand national championship in 2019.
