= Pearl Dymond =

New Zealand international lawn bowler

Personal information
- Born: Pearl Sellars; 2 October 1925 Invercargill, New Zealand
- Died: 14 January 2010 (aged 84) Taranaki, New Zealand
- Relative: Joyce Osborne (sister)

Sport
- Country: New Zealand
- Sport: Lawn bowls

Achievements and titles
- National finals: Singles champion (1979)
Medal record
Women's lawn bowls
Representing New Zealand
World Outdoor Bowls Championships
Silver medal – second place	1977 Worthing	Triples
Bronze medal – third place	1977 Worthing	Team
Commonwealth Games
Silver medal – second place	1982 Brisbane	Triples

Pearl Dymond (née Sellars; 2 October 1925 – 14 January 2010) was a New Zealand international lawn bowler.

== Bowls career ==
Dymond started bowling for the Stratford club in 1962 and won a silver medal at the 1977 World Outdoor Bowls Championship in Worthing in the triples event with Cis Winstanley and Hazel Harper. An additional bronze medal was won in the team event.

She also played in the triples team that won the silver medal in the triples event with Jennifer Simpson and Joyce Osborne at the 1982 Commonwealth Games.

At club level Dymond won 16 Taranaki titles and nine senior champion of champions singles in addition to the 1979 New Zealand National Bowls Championships singles.

== Personal life ==
Pearl Dymond's sister was Joyce Osborne and her brother was jockey and lawn bowler Vic Sellars.
