= Athletics at the 1938 British Empire Games – Men's javelin throw =

Men's javelin throw at the Commonwealth Games

The men's javelin throw event at the 1938 British Empire Games was held on 5 February at the Sydney Cricket Ground in Sydney, Australia.

== Results ==
Rank	Name	Nationality	Result	Notes
1st place, gold medalist(s)	Jim Courtright	Canada	206 ft 0 1/4 in (62.80 m)	
2nd place, silver medalist(s)	Stan Lay	New Zealand	204 ft 1 1/4 in (62.21 m)	
3rd place, bronze medalist(s)	Jack Metcalfe	Australia	182 ft 2 1/4 in (55.53 m)	
4	Harold Brown	Canada	174 ft 10 1/2 in (53.30 m)	
5	James Barlow	Australia	169 ft 0 1/4 in (51.52 m)	
6	David Goode	Australia	165 ft 1 in (50.32 m)	
7	Bert Sheiles	Australia	163 ft 10 1/2 in (49.95 m)	
8	John Clarke	Northern Ireland	162 ft 10 3/4 in (49.65 m)	
	Eric Coy	Canada	DNS	

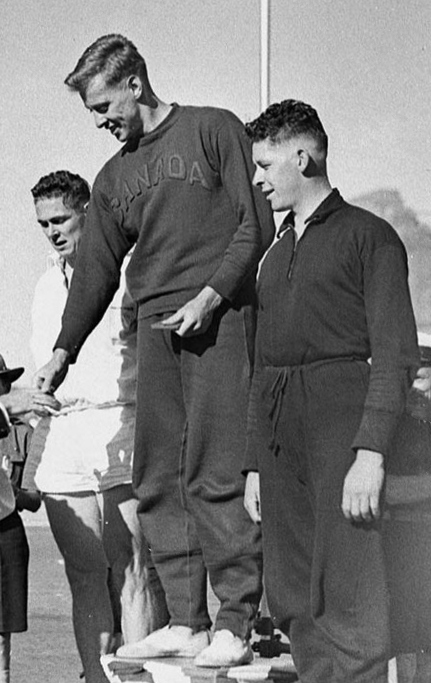
The medal winners
