= Jessie Lawson =

Scottish international lawn bowler

Personal information
- Nationality: British (Scottish)

Sport
- Sport: Lawn and indoor bowls
- Club: Ardeer BC

Jessie Lawson is a former international lawn bowler from Scotland who competed at the Commonwealth Games.

== Biography ==
Lawson was a member of the Ardeer Bowls Club and was the champion of Scotland in the singles at the 1981 Scottish National Bowls Championships. defeating June Dunshire in the final.

Lawson represented the Scottish team at the 1982 Commonwealth Games in Brisbane, Australia, where she competed in the triples event, with Janet Menzies and Jessie Adamson.

She won the Ayrshire singles in 1988 for the fourth time and reached the final again in 1992.
