= John Harper (bowls) =

Scottish international lawn bowler

Personal information
- Nationality: British (Scottish)

Sport
- Sport: Lawn and indoor bowls
- Club: Whitburn BC, Bathgate

John Harper is a former international lawn bowler from Scotland who competed at the Commonwealth Games.

== Biography ==
Harper was a member of the Whitburn Bowls Club in Bathgate and was an international player for Scotland.

Harper represented the Scottish team at the 1982 Commonwealth Games in Brisbane, Australia, where he competed in the fours event with Alex McIntosh, John Fleming and Brian Rattray, finishing in fifth place.

Harper won the 1985 Black Bottle Invitation singles and also bowled indoors for Scotland.
