= Jessie Adamson =

Scottish international lawn bowler

Personal information
- Nationality: British (Scottish)

Sport
- Sport: Lawn and indoor bowls
- Club: Uddingston BC, Glasgow; Coatbridge IBC

Jessie Adamson is a former international lawn and indoor bowler from Scotland who competed at the Commonwealth Games.

== Biography ==
Adamson was a member of the Uddingston Bowls Club in Glasgow and a member of the Coatbridge Indoor Bowls Club and represented Scotland at international level indoors. Her husband Bill was the manager of the Coatbridge Indoor Bowls Club.

Adamson represented the Scottish team at the 1982 Commonwealth Games in Brisbane, Australia, where she competed in the triples event, with Janet Menzies and Jessie Lawson.

Her good form continued after the Games as she won the rinks title at the Ladies' Indoor league at Coatbridge. Later she won the 1990 Scottish indoor triples title and was living in Rockburn Crescent, Belshill at the time.
