= Scotland at the 1982 Commonwealth Games =

- CG code: SCO
- CGA: Commonwealth Games Scotland
- Website: www.teamscotland.scot

in Brisbane, Australia
- Flag bearer: John McNiven replaced Jack Hynd
- Medals Ranked 4th: Gold 8 Silver 6 Bronze 12 Total 26

Commonwealth Games appearances (overview)
- 1930; 1934; 1938; 1950; 1954; 1958; 1962; 1966; 1970; 1974; 1978; 1982; 1986; 1990; 1994; 1998; 2002; 2006; 2010; 2014; 2018; 2022; 2026; 2030

Scotland competed at the 1982 Commonwealth Games in Brisbane, Australia, from 30 September to 9 October 1982.

The Scotland team was named on 15 August 1982 and consisted of 100 competitors.

Scotland came 4th overall with 8 golds, 6 silver and 12 bronze medals.

== Medalists ==
=== Gold ===
- Alister Allan (shooting)
- Arthur Clarke (shooting)
- Meg Ritchie (discus throw)
- Allan Wells (100 metres)
- Allan Wells (200 metres)
- Willie Wood (Lawn bowls)
- Men's 10m Air Rifle pairs (shooting)
- Men's pairs (Lawn bowls)

=== Silver ===
- Robin Brew (swimming)
- James Cairns (shooting)
- Anne Clarkson (800 metres)
- Joe Kelly (boxing)
- Men's 25m Rapid-Fire Pistol pairs (shooting)
- Women's 4 × 100 m freestyle relay (swimming)

=== Bronze ===
- Chris Black (hammer throw)
- Graham Eggleton (pole vault)
- Albert Patrick (wrestling)
- Cameron Sharp (100 metres)
- Cameron Sharp (200 metres)
- Men's 50m Rifle Three Positions pairs (shooting)
- Men's Trap pairs (shooting)
- Men's 4 × 200 m freestyle relay (swimming)
- Men's 4 × 100 m medley relay (swimming)
- Men's 4 × 100 metres relay (athletics)
- Women's 4 × 400 metres relay (athletics)

== Team ==
Men

| Athlete | Events | Club | Medals |
|---|---|---|---|
| Christopher Elliott | individual | | |
| Brian Strachan | individual | | |

Women

| Athlete | Events | Club | Medals |
|---|---|---|---|
| Sarah Miles | individual | | |
| Moira Taylor | individual | | |

=== Athletics ===
Men

| Athlete | Events | Club | Medals |
|---|---|---|---|
| Chris Black | hammer throw | | Bronze medal |
| Stanley Devine | 400 hurdles | | |
| Graham Eggleton | pole vault | | Bronze medal |
| Paul Forbes | 800 | | |
| John Graham | marathon | | |
| Allister Hutton | 5000, 10,000m | | |
| Graham C. Laing | marathon | | |
| Glenn MacDonald | 110m hurdles | | |
| Gus McCuaig | 200, 4 × 100 m | | Bronze medal |
| Drew McMaster | 100, 4 × 100 m | | Bronze medal |
| Bradley McStravick | decathlon | | |
| Nath Muir | 5000m | | |
| Geoff Parsons | high jump | | |
| John Robson | 1500m | | |
| Cameron Sharp | 100, 200, 4 × 100 m | | ,, |
| Allan Wells | 100, 200, 4 × 100 m | | ,, |
| John Williamson | 1500m | | |

Women

| Athlete | Events | Club | Medals |
|---|---|---|---|
| Angela Bridgeman | 400, 4 × 400 m | | Bronze medal |
| Anne Clarkson | 800, 4 × 400 m | | , |
| Ann Jane Girvan | 100m hurdles | | |
| Carol Lightfoot | 800 | | |
| Linsey MacDonald | 400, 4 × 400 m | | Bronze medal |
| Elaine McMaster | 100m hurdles | | |
| Yvonne Murray | 1500, 3000 | | |
| Meg Ritchie | discus, shot put | | Gold medal |
| Margaret Marion Southerden | 400m hurdles | | |
| Sandra Whittaker | 200, 4 × 400 m | | Bronze medal |

=== Badminton ===
Men

| Athlete | Events | Club | Medals |
|---|---|---|---|
| Charlie Gallagher | singles, doubles | Perth | |
| Gordon Hamilton | singles, doubles | Edinburgh | |
| David Shaylor | singles, mixed | Glasgow | |
| Alex White | singles, mixed | Kilmarnock | |

Women

| Athlete | Events | Club | Medals |
|---|---|---|---|
| Alison Fulton | doubles, mixed | Guildford | |
| Linda Gardner | singles, doubles | Netherlee | |
| Pamela Hamilton | singles, doubles | Airdrie | |
| Christine Heatly | singles, doubles, mixed | Edinburgh | |

=== Boxing ===
Men only

| Athlete | Events | Club | Medals |
|---|---|---|---|
| Russell Barker | 75 kg middleweight | | |
| Alex Dickson | 60 kg lightweight | | |
| Joe Kelly | 51 kg flyweight | | Silver medal |
| Alistair Laurie | 63.5 kg light-welterweight | | |
| John McAllister | 67 kg welterweight | Kingston Boys' Club, Glasgow | |
| David Milligan | 71 kg light-middleweight | | |

=== Cycling ===
| Athlete | Events | Club | Medal |
|---|---|---|---|
| Ken Clark | road race, road TTT | | |
| William Gibb | road race, road TTT | | |
| James McGahan | road race, road TTT | | |
| Bob Melrose | road race, road TTT | | |
| David Miller | scratch | | |
| David Whitehall | scratch, pursuit | | |

=== Diving ===
Women

| Athlete | Events | Club | Medals |
|---|---|---|---|
| Fiona Hotson | springboard, platform | Edinburgh Diving Club | |
| Jane Ogden | platform, springboard | Edinburgh Diving Club | |

=== Lawn bowls ===
Men

| Athlete | Events | Club | Medals |
|---|---|---|---|
| Jock Fleming | fours | Mauchline BC | |
| David Gourlay Sr. | pairs | Annbank BC, Ayr | Gold medal |
| John Harper | fours | Whitburn BC, Bathgate | |
| Alex McIntosh | fours | Newbattle BC | |
| Brian Rattray | fours | Alva BC | |
| John Watson | pairs | Foxley BC, Glasgow | Gold medal |
| Willie Wood | singles | Gifford BC | Gold medal |

Women

| Athlete | Events | Club | Medals |
|---|---|---|---|
| Jessie Adamson | triples | Uddingston BC, Glasgow | |
| Jessie Lawson | triples | Ardeer BC | |
| Janet Menzies | triples | Douglas Victoria BC | |

=== Shooting ===
Men

| Athlete | Events | Medals |
|---|---|---|
| Alister Allan | air rifle, pair, 3pos, pair, prone pair | ,, |
| Robert Allan | fullbore rifle, rapid fire, pair | |
| James Cairns | air pistol, pair, centre fire, pair | , |
| Arthur Clarke | fullbore rifle, pair | Gold medal |
| Jim Dunlop | skeet | |
| Martin Girvan | trap, pair | Bronze medal |
| Hugh Hunter | centre fire, rapid fire, pair | Silver medal |
| John Knowles | prone, pair | |
| Robin Macdonald | air pistol, free pistol, pair | |
| Bill MacNeil | air rifle, pair, 3pos, pair | , |
| James Young | trap, pair | Bronze medal |

=== Swimming ===
Men

| Athlete | Events | Club | Medals |
|---|---|---|---|
| Robin Brew | 100, 200 breaststroke, 200, 400 medley | Fife Incas | Silver medal |
| Doug Campbell | 100, 200 back, 200 free, relay x 2 | Taybridge ASC | , |
| Iain Campbell | 100, 200 breaststroke, relay | Taybridge ASC | Bronze medal |
| Neil Cochran | 100, 200 back, 400 medley, relay | Aberdeen ASC | Bronze medal |
| Duncan Cruickshank | 400, 1500 freestyle | Aberdeen ASC | |
| Paul Easter | 100, 200, 400, 1500 freestyle, relay x 2 | Warrender Baths Club | , |
| William McGoldrick | 100 breast, 100, 200 butterfly, relay | Taybridge ASC | Bronze medal |
| Graeme Wilson | 100, 200 freestyle, relay | Dunfermline Carnegie | Bronze medal |

Women

| Athlete | Events | Club | Medals |
|---|---|---|---|
| Cathy Finlay | 100, 200 butterfly, relay x 2 | Scotia SSC, Glasgow | , |
| Nicola Geddes | 100, 200 breaststroke, relay | Aberdeen ASC | Bronze medal |
| Alison Hamilton | 400, 800 freestyle, relay | Aberdeen ASC | Silver medal |
| Sarah Inkson | 100 back, 100, 200, 400 freestyle, relay | Aberdeen ASC | Silver medal |
| Nikki Ramsay | 100, 200 free, 200, 400 medley, relay x 2 | Scotia SSC, Glasgow | , |
| Beverley Rose | 100, 200 backstroke, relay | Scotia SSC, Glasgow | Bronze medal |

=== Weightlifting ===
| Athlete | Events | Medals |
|---|---|---|
| Robert William Kennedy | 75 kg middleweight | |
| John McNiven | 56 kg bantamweight | |
| Charles Murray | 82.5 kg light-heavyweight | |
| Charlie Revolta | 52 kg flyweight | |

=== Wrestling ===
| Athlete | Events | Medals |
|---|---|---|
| Michael Cavanagh | 68 kg lightweight | |
| John Halpin | 74 kg welterweight | |
| Neil McKay | 62 kg featherweight | |
| Albert Patrick | +100 kg super-heavyweight | Bronze medal |
| Andrew Proctor | 52 kg flyweight | |
| Donald Richardson | 57 kg bantamweight | |
