= Jennifer Osborough =

Northern Irish swimmer (born c. 1937)

Personal information
- Nationality: British (Northern Irish)
- Born: c. 1937

Sport
- Sport: Swimming
- Event: Freestyle
- Club: Victoria SC, Belfast

Jennifer Osborough (born c. 1937) is a former swimmer from Northern Ireland, who represented Northern Ireland at the British Empire Games (now Commonwealth Games).

== Biography ==
Born around 1937, Osborough was a member of the Victoria Swimming Club in Belfast and represented Ulster at senior level. She specialsed in the freestyle and took part in the Irish trials as the Empire Games approached.

She represented the 1954 Northern Irish Team at the 1954 British Empire and Commonwealth Games in Vancouver, Canada, participating in the 110 yards freestyle event and the 440 yards freestyle event.

After the games she was given a civic reception by the Lord and Mayor and Lady Mayoress at the Belfast City Hall. She later attended the Belfast Royal Academy and Queen's University Belfast and married changing her name to Jennifer Hunter.
