= Victor Milligan =

Northern Irish athlete

Personal information
- Nationality: British (Northern Irish)
- Born: 11 November 1929 Belfast, Northern Ireland
- Died: 4 March 2009 Mali, Africa

Sport
- Sport: Athletics
- Event: Middle-distance
- Club: Instonians

Victor Milligan (11 November 1929 – 4 March 2009) was an athlete from Northern Ireland, who represented Northern Ireland at the British Empire Games (now Commonwealth Games).

== Biography ==
Milligan broke the Ulster schools record in 1946 and was head boy at the Royal Belfast Academical Institution. He was awarded a scholarship to study civil engineering at Queen's University Belfast.

In 1950 he won the gold medal in the Northern Ireland 880-yards race but in 1950 missed the 1952 Summer Olympics through injury. In 1953 he improved his own Northern Ireland mile record to 4 minutes 12.5 seconds and in June 1954 broke the Northern Ireland half-mile record, setting a time of 4 minutes 8.6 seconds. After Queens, he was a member of the Instonians Club of Belfast.

He represented the 1954 Northern Irish Team at the 1954 British Empire and Commonwealth Games in Vancouver, Canada, participating in the 880 yards and 1 mile events.

His participation in The Miracle Mile, where he finished fourth made him a household name in the Northern Ireland. After the games he was given a civic reception by the Lord and Mayor and Lady Mayoress at the Belfast City Hall.

In September 1956 he emigrated to Canada, working for Imperial Chemical Industries and then Geocon Ltd before helping set up an engineering consultancy company called Golder Associates.
