= Northern Ireland at the Commonwealth Games =

- CG code: NIR
- CGA: Northern Ireland Commonwealth Games Council
- Website: www.teamni.org
- Medals Ranked 14th: Gold 37 Silver 46 Bronze 59 Total 142

Commonwealth Games appearances (overview)
- 1934; 1938; 1950; 1954; 1958; 1962; 1966; 1970; 1974; 1978; 1982; 1986; 1990; 1994; 1998; 2002; 2006; 2010; 2014; 2018; 2022; 2026; 2030

Other related appearances
- Ireland (1930)

Northern Ireland has competed in nineteen of the twenty-one Commonwealth Games beginning with the second games, held in 1934. Northern Ireland did not compete in 1930 (when there was a single team from Ireland) and in 1950. It differs from the Olympic Games where although it officially competes with England, Scotland and Wales as part of Great Britain, many athletes have represented the Ireland team.

Northern Ireland's participation in the Commonwealth Games is managed by the Northern Ireland Commonwealth Games Council.

== Medal tally ==
=== Medals by Games ===
Games	Gold	Silver	Bronze	Total	Rank
(Canada) 1930 Hamilton	Competed as part of Ireland team				
(England) 1934 London	0	1	2	3	9
(Australia) 1938 Sydney	0	0	0	0	15
(New Zealand) 1950 Auckland	did not participate				
(Canada) 1954 Vancouver	2	1	0	3	9
(Wales) 1958 Cardiff	1	1	3	5	12
(Australia) 1962 Perth	0	0	1	1	17
(Jamaica) 1966 Kingston	1	3	3	7	14
(Scotland) 1970 Edinburgh	3	1	5	9	10
(New Zealand) 1974 Christchurch	3	1	2	6	9
(Canada) 1978 Edmonton	2	1	2	5	10
(Australia) 1982 Brisbane	0	3	3	6	17
(Scotland) 1986 Edinburgh	2	4	9	15	7
(New Zealand) 1990 Auckland	1	3	5	9	13
(Canada) 1994 Victoria	5	3	2	10	10
(Malaysia) 1998 Kuala Lumpur	2	1	1	4	13
(England) 2002 Manchester	2	2	1	5	17
(Australia) 2006 Melbourne	0	2	0	2	24
(India) 2010 Delhi	3	3	4	10	14
(Scotland) 2014 Glasgow	2	3	7	12	15
(Australia) 2018 Gold Coast	1	7	4	12	20
(England) 2022 Birmingham	7	7	4	18	11
Total	37	46	59	142	14

== Flag and victory anthem ==
As of 2022, the Northern Ireland team uses the Ulster Banner, as its national flag. In November 2024, the Northern Ireland Commonwealth Games Council (NICGC) discussed the possibility of using its own flag at the Commonwealth Games if a new "Civic Flag" proposed by the Commission on Flags, Identity, Culture and Traditions is not in place before the 2026 Commonwealth Games.

The team uses "Londonderry Air" as its victory anthem.

The team logo, and of the Commonwealth Games Council for Northern Ireland, features a stylised version of the Red Hand of Ulster, a traditional emblem of the province of Ulster of which Northern Ireland is a part. It should also be noted that the palm and thumb form the letters NI = Northern Ireland

The team goes by the abbreviation NIR.

Logo of Team NI: the palm and thumb form the letters NI = Northern Ireland

Former logo of Team NI

Flag used to represent Northern Ireland at the 1934 British Empire Games

== See also ==
- Ireland at the Commonwealth Games
