= Billy Devlin =

Northern Irish swimmer

Personal information
- Nationality: British (Northern Irish)

Sport
- Sport: Swimming
- Event: Backstroke
- Club: East End, Belfast

William Devlin is a former swimmer from Northern Ireland, who represented Northern Ireland at the British Empire Games (now Commonwealth Games).

== Biography ==
Devlin was an Ulster boys champion while at the Fortwilliam School in Belfast and a cadet with the 1919 Squadron of the Air Training Corps. He was a member of the East End Club of Belfast and first represented Ulster at senior level in 1954.

Specialising in the backstroke, he broke the 1954 Irish backstroke record in July 1954.

He represented the 1954 Northern Irish Team at the 1954 British Empire and Commonwealth Games in Vancouver, Canada, participating in the 110 yards backstroke event.

After the games he was given a civic reception by the Lord and Mayor and Lady Mayoress at the Belfast City Hall and in August 1954 broke another Irish backstroke record.
