= Lisa Lynas =

Northern Irish badminton player (born 1981)

Personal information
- Nationality: British (Northern Irish)
- Born: 3 November 1981

Sport
- Sport: Badminton
- Club: Alpha BC, Lisburn

Lisa Sharon Ruth Lynas (born 3 November 1981), is a former international badminton player from Northern Ireland who competed at two Commonwealth Games.

== Biography ==
Lynas studied psychology at Queen's University Belfast and played for the Alpha Badminton Club in Lisburn. She represented Ulster at provincial level and the all-Ireland team at international level.

Lynas was primarily a singles player but was also proficient in doubles play and partners included Eugenwe McKenna in mixed doubles. Lynas competed for the 2002 Northern Irish team at the 2002 Commonwealth Games in Manchester, England, where she competed in badminton tournament.

Lynas went to a second Commonwealth Games when she was chosen for the 2006 Northern Irish team at the 2006 Commonwealth Games in Melbourne, Australia, where she competed in badminton tournament. Also in 2006, she won a hat-trick of titles at the Ulster Open Championships, winning the singles, doubles and mixed.
