= Northern Ireland at the 1938 British Empire Games =

- CG code: NIR
- CGA: Northern Ireland Commonwealth Games Council
- Website: nicgc.org

in Sydney, Australia
- Medals: Gold 0 Silver 0 Bronze 0 Total 0

British Empire Games appearances
- 1934; 1938; 1950; 1954; 1958; 1962; 1966; 1970; 1974; 1978; 1982; 1986; 1990; 1994; 1998; 2002; 2006; 2010; 2014; 2018; 2022; 2026; 2030

Other related appearances
- Ireland (1930)

Northern Ireland at the 1938 British Empire Games (abbreviated NIR) was the second time that the nation had participated at the Games following an appearance in 1934. Only four athletes were sent during a time of political change that saw the Irish Free State recently becoming Ireland.

The Games were held in Sydney, Australia from 5 to 12 February 1938 and Northern Ireland was unplaced in the medal table, being one of five nations (out of 15) that did not win a medal.

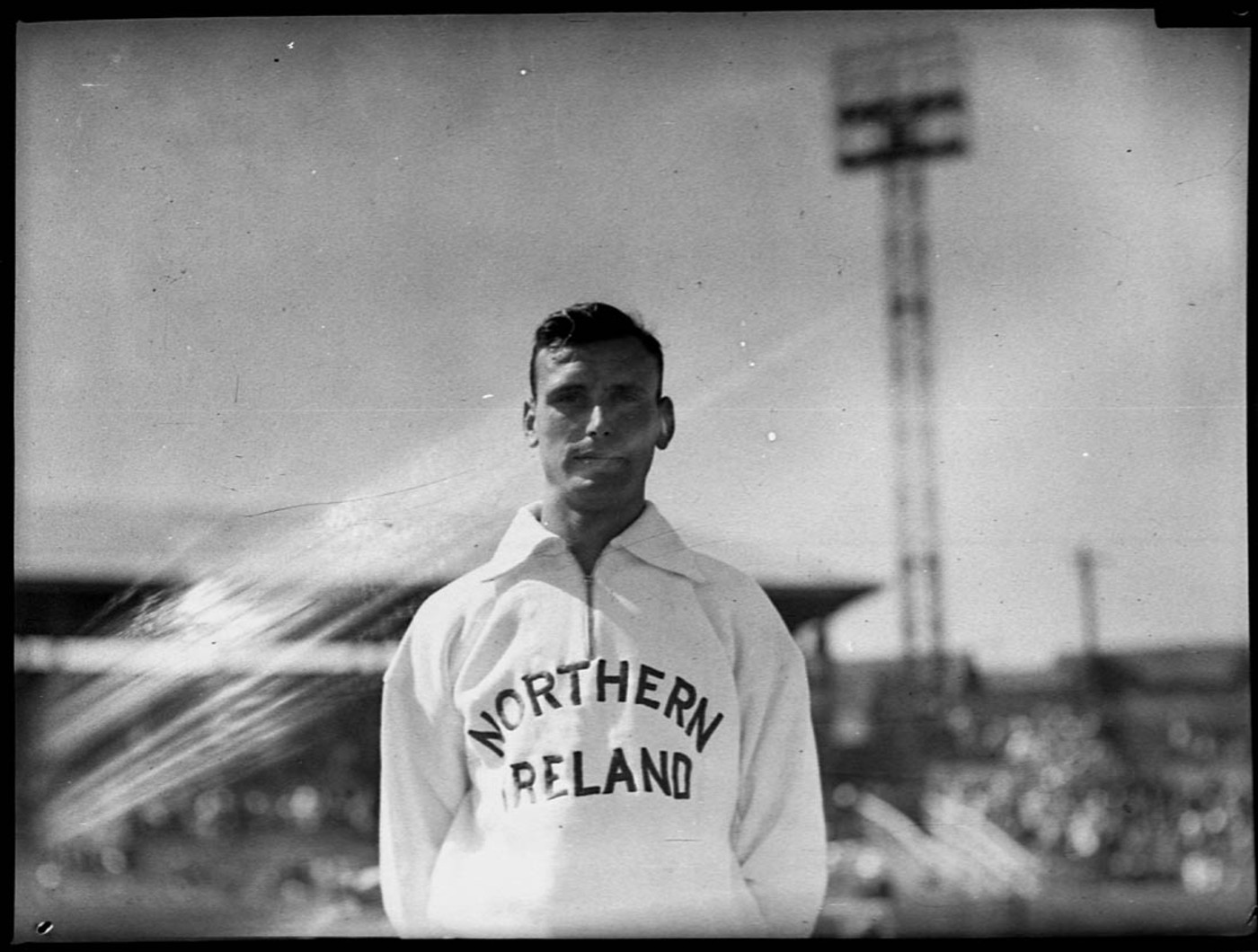
Photo of a Northern Irish athlete at the Games (believed to be Alexander Haire)

== Team ==
=== Athletics ===
| Athlete | Events | Club | Notes |
|---|---|---|---|
| Alexander Haire | 880 yards / 1 mile | R.U.C. | |
| Albert Shillington | long jump/triple jump | Willowfield Temperance Harriers, Belfast | |
| John Clarke | Pole vault, javelin | R.U.C. | |

=== Lawn Bowls ===
| Athlete | Events | Club | Notes |
|---|---|---|---|
| W. J. Clarke | singles | Cavehill BC, Belfast | |
