= John McCloughlin =

Northern Irish international lawn bowler

Personal information
- Nationality: British (Northern Irish)
- Born: 9 March 1958 (age 68) Lisburn, Northern Ireland

Sport
- Sport: Bowls
- Club: Lisnagarvey BC
Medal record
Representing Ireland
World Outdoor Championships
Gold medal – first place	1988 Auckland	Men's fours
Representing Northern Ireland
Commonwealth Games
Bronze medal – third place	1982 Brisbane	Men's fours
Silver medal – second place	1990 Auckland	Men's fours
Bronze medal – third place	1994 Victoria	Men's fours

John McCloughlin is an Irish international lawn and indoor bowler born on 9 March 1958.

== Biography ==
McLoughlin was born in Lisburn and bowled from the age of eleven. He has represented Ireland both indoors and outdoors.

He represented the Northern Irish team at the 1982 Commonwealth Games in Brisbane, Australia, where he competed in the fours event. The team of McLoughlin, Frank Campbell, Willie Watson and Sammy Allen won a bronze medal.

His greatest moment came when winning the gold medal in the 1988 World Outdoor Bowls Championship fours.

He won a silver with Northern Ireland at the 1990 Commonwealth Games in Auckland, New Zealand and another bronze at the 1994 Commonwealth Games fours.
