= Joyce Osborne =

New Zealand lawn bowler

Personal information
- Relative: Pearl Dymond (sister)

Sport
- Country: New Zealand
- Sport: Lawn bowls
- Club: Manawatu BC
Medal record
Representing New Zealand
World Outdoor Championships
Bronze medal – third place	1985 Melbourne	team
Commonwealth Games
Silver medal – second place	1982 Brisbane	triples
Asia Pacific Bowls Championships
Gold medal – first place	1985 Tweed Heads	pairs
Gold medal – first place	1985 Tweed Heads	fours
Silver medal – second place	1987 Lae	fours

Joyce Osborne is a former New Zealand international lawn bowler.

== Bowls career ==
Osborne played in the team that won the silver medal in the triples event with Pearl Dymond and Jennifer Simpson at the 1982 Commonwealth Games. Four years later she represented New Zealand again at the Lawn bowls at the 1986 Commonwealth Games.

Osborne has also won two gold medals at the 1985 Asia Pacific Bowls Championships in Tweed Heads, New South Wales, Australia and a silver medal two years later.

She won the singles title at the 1972 and 1983 New Zealand National Bowls Championships when bowling for the Manawatu Bowls Club.

== Personal life ==
Osborne's sister was Pearl Dymond and her brother is jockey Vic Sellars.
