= Janet Menzies =

Scottish international lawn bowler

Personal information
- Nationality: British (Scottish)

Sport
- Sport: Lawn and indoor bowls
- Club: Douglas Victoria BC

Janet Menzies also known as Jen Menzies is a former international lawn bowler from Scotland who competed at two Commonwealth Games.

== Biography ==
Menzies was a member of the Douglas Victoria Bowls Club and took part in the 1978 Scottish Women's Bowling Association trials in view to gaining a place in the Scottish squad.

Menzies represented the Scottish team at the 1982 Commonwealth Games in Brisbane, Australia, where she competed in the triples event, with Jessie Lawson and Jessie Adamson.

She was the champion of Scotland in the fours at the 1981 Scottish National Bowls Championships. and continued to represent Scotland at the home internationals.

She appeared for Scotland again at the 1986 Commonwealth Games.
