= Julian Haines =

British lawn bowler

Personal information
- Nationality: British (English)
- Born: February 1944
- Died: 7 March 2017 (aged 73)

Sport
- Club: Boscombe Cliff
Medal record
Representing England
World Outdoor Championships
| Gold medal – first place | 1984 Aberdeen | Men's fours |
| Bronze medal – third place | 1984 Aberdeen | Men's team |

Julian Roy Haines (1944–2017) was an English international lawn and indoor bowler.

== Bowls career ==
Haines bowled for Berkshire and won the National Indoor Pairs in 1974. His finest moment came when he won the Fours gold medal at the 1984 World Outdoor Bowls Championship in Aberdeen with Tony Allcock, John Bell and George Turley.

He represented England in the fours, at the 1986 Commonwealth Games in Edinburgh, Scotland.

In 1999, he won the national triples, bowling for Boscombe Cliff.

== Personal life ==
He started a company called Julian Haines Bowls Limited in 1998 which is based at the Bournemouth Indoor Bowls Centre. The company sells bowls goods and provides forums detailing aspects of the sport.

He died on 7 March 2017.
