= Brendan McBrien =

Northern Irish international lawn bowler

Personal information
- Nationality: British (Northern Irish)

Sport
- Club: Falls BC

Brendan McBrien is a former international lawn and indoor bowler from Northern Ireland who competed at the Commonwealth Games.

== Biography ==
McBrien was a member of the Falls Bowls Club in Belfast. He also played indoor bowls for Belfast, winning the 1975 Easter International pairs with Jimmy Donnelly.

McBrien represented the Northern Irish team at the 1978 Commonwealth Games in Edmonton, Canada, where he competed in the pairs event with John Higgins.

McBrien made history by winning British Isles Indoors Championshipthe in the singles, pairs and fours. With Edward Gordon he won the 1970 pairs and in 1974 he skipped the four.

McBrien participated at the 1980 World Outdoor Bowls Championship for Ireland and represented the Northern Irish team at the 1982 Commonwealth Games in Brisbane, Australia, where he competed in the pairs event with Billy McKelvey.
