= Roy McGowan =

Irish sports shooter

Roy Magowan
Personal information
- Nationality: British (Northern Irish)
- Born: 21 November 1939 (age 86) Newtownards, Northern Ireland
- Height: 79 cm (2 ft 7 in)
- Weight: 82 kg (181 lb)

Sport
- Sport: Sports shooting

Roy McGowan (born 21 November 1939) is an Irish sports shooter who competed for Ireland at the 1984 Summer Olympics and Northern Ireland at the Commonwealth Games.

== Biography ==
McGowan represented the Northern Irish team at the 1982 Commonwealth Games in Brisbane, Australia, where he participated in the trap event.

At the 1984 Olympic Games in Los Angeles he participated in the mixed trap event. He was the Irish national trap shooting champion for a time.
