= Alex Sim =

Northern Irish international badminton player

Personal information
- Nationality: British (Northern Irish)
- Born: c.1987

Sport
- Sport: Badminton
- Club: Alpha BC, Lisburn

Alexander Padraig Samuel Sim (born c.1987), is a former international badminton player from Northern Ireland who competed at the Commonwealth Games.

== Biography ==
Sim was a member of the Alpha Badminton Club in Lisburn and represented Ireland at various age-levels.

He represented Ulster at provincial level and represented the all-Ireland team at international level.

Sim represented the 2006 Northern Irish team at the 2006 Commonwealth Games in Melbourne, Australia, where he competed in men's singles event. Sim had based himself in the Copenhagen, Denmark leading up to the Games, and continued to play in the Danish league afterwards.
