= Athletics at the 1954 British Empire and Commonwealth Games – Men's 1 mile =

Men's 1 mile at the 1954 British Empire and Commonwealth Games
- Venue: Empire Stadium
- Start date: 6 August 1954
- End date: 7 August 1954
- Winning time: 3:58.8

Medalists
gold medal	Roger Bannister	England
silver medal	John Landy	Australia
bronze medal	Rich Ferguson	Canada

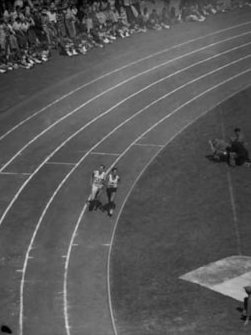
Bannister and Landy battle it out. Attribution:Province newspaper

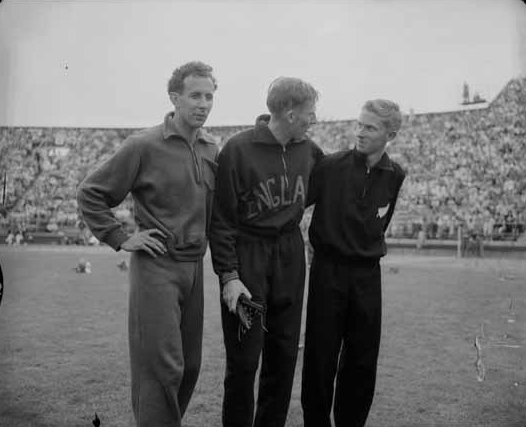
Medallists left to right - Landy, Bannister, Halberg. Attribution:Province newspaper

The men's 1 mile event at the 1954 British Empire and Commonwealth Games was held on 6 and 7 August at the Empire Stadium in Vancouver, Canada.

The final race – dubbed The Miracle Mile – represented a landmark in the history of the Four-minute mile. Roger Bannister had been the first to have broken the barrier earlier that year, but John Landy followed soon after with sub-4 minute (and world record time of 3:58.0) of his own. The games offered the first time that two sub-4 minute runners had duelled against each other. Landy led until the final curve, at which point he turned left to gauge Bannister's position. Bannister took the opportunity to overtake him on his blind side and he edged out a victory over Landy with a time of 3:58.8 minutes. Landy also ran under four minutes, representing the first time two men had done so in the same race. A sculpture of the race-deciding moment was later placed outside the stadium in memory of the duel.

== Medalists ==
Gold	Silver	Bronze
Roger Bannister; England	John Landy; Australia	Rich Ferguson; Canada

== Results ==
=== Heats ===
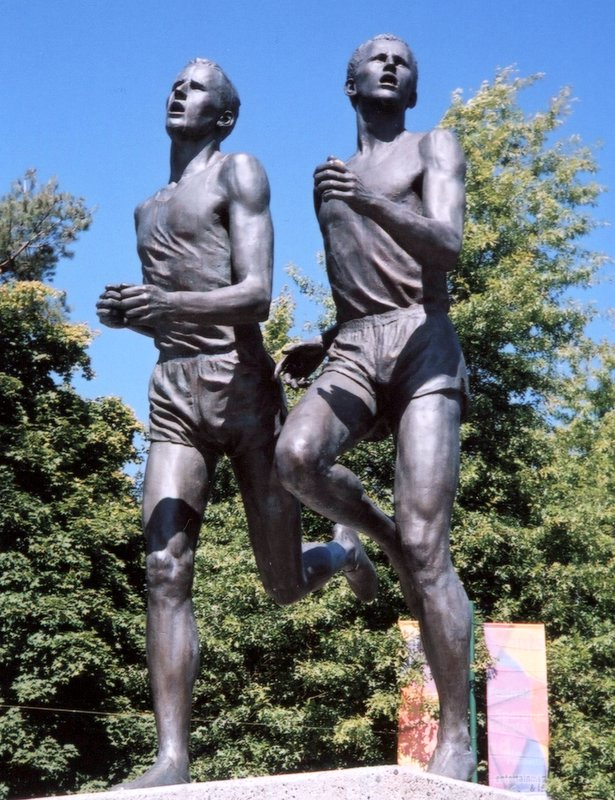
A sculpture commemorating the Miracle mile

Qualification: First 4 in each heat (Q) qualify directly for the final.

Rank	Heat	Name	Nationality	Time	Notes
1	1	Murray Halberg	New Zealand	4:07.4	Q, GR
2	1	Rich Ferguson	Canada	4:07.8	Q
3	1	Roger Bannister	England	4:08.4	Q
4	1	David Law	England	4:08.6	Q
5	1	John Disley	Wales	4:09.0	
6	1	Don MacMillan	Australia	4:11.6	
7	1	John Moule	Canada	4:17.2	
	1	Edwin Warren	Australia	DNF	
	1	James Daly	New Zealand	DNF	
1	2	Bill Baillie	New Zealand	4:11.4	Q
2	2	Victor Milligan	Northern Ireland	4:11.4	Q
3	2	John Landy	Australia	4:11.4	Q
4	2	Ian Boyd	England	4:11.6	Q
5	2	Bill Parnell	Canada	4:13.8	
6	2	Chris Brasher	England	4:15.4	
7	2	Edward Morton	Canada	4:23.2	
	2	Jim Bailey	Australia	DNS	

=== Final ===
Rank	Name	Nationality	Time	Notes
1st place, gold medalist(s)	Roger Bannister	England	3:58.8	GR
2nd place, silver medalist(s)	John Landy	Australia	3:59.6	
3rd place, bronze medalist(s)	Rich Ferguson	Canada	4:04.6	
4	Victor Milligan	Northern Ireland	4:05.0	
5	Murray Halberg	New Zealand	4:07.2	
6	Ian Boyd	England	4:07.2	
7	Bill Baillie	New Zealand	4:11.0	
	David Law	England	DNF	
