= John Watson (bowls) =

Scottish international lawn bowler

Personal information
- Nationality: British (Scottish)
- Born: 22 November 1945 (age 80)

Sport
- Sport: Lawn and indoor bowls
- Club: Foxley BC, Glasgow
Medal record
Representing Scotland
Commonwealth Games
Gold medal – first place	1982 Brisbane	Men's pairs
World Indoor Bowls Championships
Gold medal – first place	1982 Coatbridge	Men's singles

John Watson (born 22 November 1945) is a former lawn and indoor bowler from Scotland who competed at the Commonwealth Games.

== Biography ==
Watson came to prominence in 1975 after winning the Scottish indoor junior singles title. Three years later he defeated Jim Blake in the Scottish National singles final and then won his first international indoor cap in 1979.

Watson won the 1982 World Indoor Bowls Championship but refused to accept his prize money so that he could compete in the 1982 Commonwealth Games.

He subsequently represented the Scottish team at the 1982 Commonwealth Games in Brisbane, Australia, where he competed in the apirs event, with David Gourlay Sr.. His decision to compete in the Commonwealth Games proved fruitful because he won the pairs gold medal.
