= Jim Scott (bowls) =

New Zealand international lawn and indoor bowls player

Personal information
- Nationality: New Zealander
- Born: 1950 (age 75–76)

Sport
- Sport: Lawn bowls
- Club: Johnsonville BC
Medal record
Representing New Zealand
Commonwealth Games
Silver medal – second place	1982 Brisbane	men's fours
World Outdoor Championships
Bronze medal – third place	1984 Aberdeen	Men's triples
Silver medal – second place	1984 Aberdeen	Men's fours
Silver medal – second place	1984 Aberdeen	Men's team
Asia Pacific Bowls Championships
Bronze medal – third place	1989 Suva	triples

Jim Scott (born 1950) is a former New Zealand international lawn and indoor bowls player.

== Bowls career ==
He won a silver medal in the fours at the 1982 Commonwealth Games in Brisbane. Two years later he won a bronze in the triples and silver in the fours at the 1984 World Outdoor Bowls Championship in Aberdeen.

He won a triples bronze medal at the Asia Pacific Bowls Championships in Suva, Fiji. He won the 1982 singles title and 1980 fours title at the New Zealand National Bowls Championships when bowling for the Johnsonville Bowls Club.

== Personal life ==
He was a bank official by trade.
