= Athletics at the 1938 British Empire Games – Men's pole vault =

Men's pole vault at the Commonwealth Games

The men's pole vault event at the 1938 British Empire Games was held on 12 February at the Sydney Cricket Ground in Sydney, Australia.

== Results ==
Rank	Name	Nationality	Result	Notes
1st place, gold medalist(s)	Andries du Plessis	South Africa	13 ft 5 3/4 in (4.11 m)	GR
2nd place, silver medalist(s)	Les Fletcher	Australia	13 ft 0 1/4 in (3.97 m)	
3rd place, bronze medalist(s)	Stuart Frid	Canada	12 ft 9 in (3.89 m)	
4	Frederick Webster	England	12 ft 9 in (3.89 m)	
5	Ted Winter	Australia	12 ft 9 in (3.89 m)	
6	Ian Barratt	Southern Rhodesia	12 ft 4 1/2 in (3.77 m)	
7	Fred Woodhouse	Australia	12 ft 4 1/2 in (3.77 m)	
8	Bill Cartwright	Australia	11 ft 6 in (3.51 m)	
9	Arthur Dep	British Ceylon	11 ft 6 in (3.51 m)	
	John Clarke	Northern Ireland	NM	
