= Brian Rattray =

Scottish international lawn and indoor bowls player

Personal information
- Nationality: British (Scottish)
- Born: 8 July 1950 (age 76)

Sport
- Sport: Lawn and indoor bowls
- Club: Alva BC
Medal record
World Outdoor Championships
| Silver medal – second place | 1984 Aberdeen | triples |
| Bronze medal – third place | 1984 Aberdeen | fours |
| Gold medal – first place | 1984 Aberdeen | team |

Brian Rattray (born 8 July 1950) is a former international lawn and indoor bowls player from Scotland who competed at the Commonwealth Games.

== Biography ==
Rattray represented the Scottish team at the 1982 Commonwealth Games in Brisbane, Australia, where he competed in the fours event, with Alex McIntosh, John Fleming and John Harper. finishing in fifth place.

Rattray won a silver medal in the triples and a bronze medal in the fours at the 1984 World Outdoor Bowls Championship in Aberdeen.

Rattray was the singles champion at the 1982 Scottish National Bowls Championships which meant that he represented Scotland the following year at the British Isles Bowls Championships.
