= Laka Rawali =

Personal information
- Nationality: Papua New Guinean
Medal record
Representing (Papua New Guinea)
Asia Pacific Bowls Championships
Gold medal – first place	1987 Lae	fours

Laka Rawali is a former Papua New Guinea international lawn bowler.

== Bowls career ==
Rawali was selected as part of the five man team by Papua New Guinea for the 1984 World Outdoor Bowls Championship, which was held in Aberdeen, Scotland.

He won a gold medal at the 1987 Asia Pacific Bowls Championships in the fours at Lae in his home country.
