= Doug Lambert =

Personal information
- Nationality: Scotland
- Born: 23 July 1946 (age 79)
Medal record
Representing Scotland
World Outdoor Championships
Silver medal – second place	1984 Aberdeen	triples
Bronze medal – third place	1984 Aberdeen	fours
Gold medal – first place	1984 Aberdeen	team

Doug Lambert (born 1946) is a former Scottish international lawn and indoor bowls player.

Lambert won a silver medal in the triples and a bronze medal in the fours at the 1984 World Outdoor Bowls Championship in Aberdeen. He played for the Bridge of Earn club in Perthshire.
