= David Geddes (badminton) =

Northern Irish international badminton player

Personal information
- Nationality: British (Northern Irish)
- Born: 25 September 1970 (age 55)

Sport
- Sport: Badminton
- Club: Alpha BC, Lisburn

David John Geddes also known as DJ Geddes (born 25 September 1970), is a former international badminton player from Northern Ireland who competed at two Commonwealth Games.

== Biography ==
Geddes was a member of the Alpha Badminton Club in Lisburn and won the 1991 Irish Junior Championship doubles partnering Ian Plunkett. He represented Ulster at provincial level and the all-Ireland team at international level.

Geddes specialised in doubles play and partners included George Stephens and Graham Henderson in the men's doubles

He represented the 1998 Northern Irish team at the 1998 Commonwealth Games in Kuala Lumpur, Malaysia, where he competed in badminton tournament. He attended a second Commonwealth Games, competing for the 2002 Northern Irish team at the 2002 Commonwealth Games in Manchester, England, where he competed in the singles and doubles (the latter with Bruce Topping.
