= George Turley =

English bowler and footballer (1931–2010)

Personal information
- Nationality: British (English)
- Born: 3rd quarter 1931 Middlesbrough
- Died: 25 May 2010 Durham

Sport
- Sport: Bowls; Association football
- Club: Eldon Grove BC
Medal record
Representing England
World Outdoor Championships
Gold medal – first place	1984 Aberdeen	Men's fours
Bronze medal – third place	1984 Aberdeen	Men's team

George Edward Turley (1931 – 25 May 2010) was an English international lawn and indoor bowler and Middlesbrough footballer.

== Bowls career ==
=== World Championships ===
Turley's finest moment came when he won the Fours gold medal at the 1984 World Outdoor Bowls Championship in Aberdeen with Tony Allcock, John Bell and Julian Haines.

=== Commonwealth Games ===
He represented England at the 1982 Commonwealth Games in the fours, at the 1982 Commonwealth Games in Brisbane, Queensland, Australia.

=== National ===
He was the national pairs champion with Mal Hughes at the 1983 National Championships bowling for Eldon Grove BC of Durham.

Turley made his England international bowls debut indoors in 1974 and outdoors in 1980.

== Football career ==
Turley played professional football for Middlesbrough from 1949 until 1951.
