= Billy McKelvey =

Northern Irish international lawn bowler

Personal information
- Nationality: British (Northern Irish)

Sport
- Sport: Lawn and indoor bowls
- Club: Falls BC
Medal record
Representing Northern Ireland
Irish Nationals
Gold medal – first place	1976	triples
Gold medal – first place	1978	triples

William McKelvey is a former international lawn and indoor bowler from Northern Ireland who competed at the Commonwealth Games.

== Biography ==
McKelvey was a member of the Fall Bowls Club of Belfast.

He was the triples champion of Ireland at the 1976 and 1978 Irish National Bowls Championships.

McKelvey was the 1980 British indoor champion.

McKelvey represented the Northern Irish team at the 1982 Commonwealth Games in Brisbane, Australia, where he competed in the pairs event with Brendan McBrien.
