= David Gourlay Sr. =

Scottish bowls player

Personal information
- Nationality: British (Scottish)
- Born: 24 May 1937 (age 89)

Sport
- Sport: Lawn and indoor bowls
- Club: Annbank BC, Ayr
Medal record
Representing Scotland
World Outdoor Championships
Bronze medal – third place	1984 Aberdeen	fours
Gold medal – first place	1984 Aberdeen	team
Commonwealth Games
Gold medal – first place	1982 Brisbane	pairs

David Gourlay Senior (born 24 May 1937) is a former international lawn and indoor bowler from Scotland who competed at the Commonwealth Games.

== Biography ==
Gourlay won the Scottish and British indoor pairs, triples and fours championships and has been capped by Scotland both indoors and outdoors. His greatest achievement was when representing the Scottish team at the 1982 Commonwealth Games in Brisbane, Australia, where he competed in the pairs event, with John Watson and won the gold medal.

Gourlay Sr. helped Scotland win the 1984 World Outdoor Bowls Team Event (the W.M.Leonard Trophy) in Aberdeen.

His wife Sarah Gourlay won a fours gold medal at the 1985 World Outdoor Championships in Melbourne and his son David Gourlay Jr. won the 1996 World Indoor Bowls Championship.

He is related to the Scottish footballers James Gourlay and Jimmy Gourlay.
