= Gavin Noble =

Irish triathlete

Personal information
- Born: 9 April 1981 (age 44) Enniskillen, County Fermanagh, Northern Ireland
- Height: 1.86 m (6 ft 1 in)
- Weight: 74–78 kg (163–172 lb)

Sport
- Country: Ireland
- Team: Specialized, Triathlon Team

Gavin Noble (born 9 April 1981 in Enniskillen, County Fermanagh, Northern Ireland) is a Northern Irish professional triathlete.

Gavin competes mostly in ITU sanctioned races. He represented Northern Ireland at the 2002 & 2006 Commonwealth Games and Ireland in the European Cup and World Cup campaigns. Noble came 23rd in the London 2012 Olympics in the men's triathlon for Ireland.

== Results ==
Year	Race	Position	Result
2010	Hong Kong ITU Triathlon Asian Cup	1st	?
2010	Tongyeong ITU Triathlon World Cup	9th	?
2010	Tuscaloosa ITU Triathlon Premium Pan American Cup	7th	?
2010	Irish Sprint Champs	1st	?
2010	Dublin City Triathlon (Irish National Champs)	1st	1:56:44
2010	Royal Windsor Triathlon	3rd	1:52:17
2010	ITU World Championship Series Madrid	DNF (puncture)	---
2010	Fuente Alamo Triathlon, Spain	1st	?
2009	Yokohama ITU World Championship Series, Yokohama, Japan	11th	1:46:54
2009	London ITU World Championship Series, London, UK	21st	1:43:28
2009	Washington ITU World Championship Series, Washington DC, USA	25th	1:53:34
2009	British National Championship, Strathclyde Park, Glasgow, GB	6th	1:53:55
2008	ETU Triathlon European Championships, Lisbon, Portugal	27th	1:56:56
2007	BG Triathlon World Championships, Hamburg, Germany	45th	1:46:58
2007	ETU Triathlon European Championships, Copenhagen, Denmark	27th	1:54:15
2004	U23 ITU Triathlon World Championships, Madeira, Portugal	13th	1:46:56
2001	Junior ETU Triathlon European Championships, Karlovy Vary, Czech Republic	40th	1:12:42
