= Michael Williamson (swimmer) =

Irish swimmer

Personal information
- Full name: Michael Williamson
- National team: Ireland
- Born: 5 February 1981 (age 45) Belfast, Northern Ireland
- Height: 1.87 m (6 ft 2 in)
- Weight: 78 kg (172 lb)

Sport
- Sport: Swimming
- Strokes: Breaststroke
Medal record
Men's swimming
Representing Ireland
Universiade
Bronze medal – third place	2003 Daegu	200 m breaststroke

Michael Williamson (born 5 February 1981) is an Irish former swimmer, who specialized in breaststroke events. He won a bronze medal in the 200 m breaststroke at the 2003 Summer Universiade in Daegu, South Korea with a time of 2:15.52.

Williamson qualified for the men's 200 m breaststroke at the 2004 Summer Olympics in Athens, by achieving a FINA A-standard entry time of 2:14.18 from the British Olympic trials in Sheffield. He challenged seven other swimmers on the sixth heat, including top medal favorites Brendan Hansen of the United States and Dániel Gyurta of Hungary. He raced to sixth place by more than a second behind Gyurta's teammate Richárd Bodor, outside his entry time of 2:15.75. Williamson failed to advance into the semifinals, as he placed twenty-second overall in the preliminaries.

Three months after the Games, Williamson announced his retirement from swimming to focus his efforts on his career.
