= Don Sherman =

Australian lawn bowler

Personal information
- Nationality: Australian
- Born: October 6, 1934
- Died: July 27, 2017 (aged 82) Bendigo
Medal record
Representing Australia
Commonwealth Games
Gold medal – first place	1982 Brisbane	Men's fours
Asia Pacific Bowls Championships
Gold medal – first place	1985 Tweed Heads	fours

Don Sherman (6 October 1943 – 27 July 2017) was an Australian international lawn bowler, and a master builder by trade and bred cattle and horses.

== Biography ==
Sherman represented Australia at the 1982 Commonwealth Games and won a gold medal in the 1982 Commonwealth Games in Brisbane.

He won a gold medal at the Asia Pacific Bowls Championships in the 1985 fours at Tweed Heads, New South Wales.

He died on 27 July 2017 after a battle with illness at the age of 82.
