= Tommy Evans (cyclist) =

Irish cyclist

Personal information
- Nickname: Pocket-Rocket
- Born: Banbridge, County Down, Northern Ireland
- Height: 5 ft 6 in (168 cm)
- Weight: 57 kg (126 lb)

Cycling career
- Sport: Cycling
- Discipline: Road bicycle racing
- Role: Rider

Major wins
- Rás Tailteann, 1996

Tommy Evans is an Irish cyclist. He won the Rás Tailteann in 1996.
