= Alan Lewis (sport shooter) =

Irish sports shooter

Alan Lewis (born 20 November 1950 in Glengormley) is an Irish sport shooter. He tied for 41st place in the men's 50 metre rifle prone event at the 2000 Summer Olympics.
