= Sammy Allen =

Northern Irish lawn and indoor bowler (born 1938)

Personal information
- Nationality: Northern Irish
- Born: 6 July 1938 (age 87) Belfast, Northern Ireland

Sport
- Sport: Lawn and indoor bowls
- Club: Ballymena BC
Medal record
Representing Northern Ireland
Commonwealth Games
Bronze medal – third place	1982 Brisbane	Men's fours
Silver medal – second place	1990 Auckland	Men's fours
Bronze medal – third place	1994 Victoria	Men's pairs
Representing combined Ireland
World Outdoor Championships
Gold medal – first place	1984 Aberdeen	Men's triples
Gold medal – first place	1988 Auckland	Men's fours
Silver medal – second place	1992 Worthing	Men's pairs
Gold medal – first place	1996 Adelaide	Men's pairs
British Isles Championships
Gold medal – first place	1980	singles

Samuel Barnett Allen (born 6 July 1938) is a former lawn and indoor bowler from Northern Ireland.

== Bowls career ==
Allen has been bowling since 1966 and has skipped a combined Ireland both indoors and outdoors. He won a Fours bronze medal at the Commonwealth Games for Northern Ireland. Allen also won a gold medal for the Triples in the 1984 World Outdoor Championships in Aberdeen and a Fours gold at the 1988 World Outdoor Championships in Auckland. Further success came when he won the 1996 World Outdoor Championships Pairs Gold in Adelaide with Jeremy Henry.

He won a silver with Northern Ireland at the 1990 Commonwealth Games in Auckland, New Zealand.

Allen played outdoors for the Ballymena Seniors team and his other achievements include winning the British Isles Bowls Championships in 1980 and the 1979 Irish National Bowls Championships singles.
