= 1988 United States Olympic trials (swimming) =

1988 United States Olympic Trials (swimming)
- Host city: Austin, Texas, U.S.
- Date: August 8 – August 13
- Events: 26 (men: 13 women: 13)

The 1988 United States Olympic trials for swimming events were held from August 8 to 13 in Austin, Texas. It was the qualifying meet for American swimmers who hoped to compete at the 1988 Summer Olympics in Seoul.

== Results ==
Key: Highlighted swimmers achieved the qualification conditions to be included in the Olympic team in that respective event.

=== Men's events ===
| Event | Gold | | Silver | | Bronze | |
|---|---|---|---|---|---|---|
| 50 m freestyle | Tom Jager | 22.26 | Matt Biondi | 22.50 | Steve Crocker | 22.65 |
| 100 m freestyle | Matt Biondi | 48.42 WR | Chris Jacobs | 49.45 | Tom Jager | 49.88 |
| 200 m freestyle | Troy Dalbey | 1:48.35 | Matt Biondi | 1:48.37 | Doug Gjertsen | 1:48.79 |
| 400 m freestyle | Matt Cetlinski | 3:48.06 NR | Dan Jorgensen | 3:50.10 | John Mykkanen | 3:53.12 |
| 1500 m freestyle | Matt Cetlinski | 15:05.93 | Lars Jorgensen | 15:10.17 | Scott Brackett | 15:13.02 |
| 100 m backstroke | David Berkoff | 54.91 WR | Jay Mortenson | 55.97 | Andy Gill | 56.20 |
| 200 m backstroke | Dan Veatch | 2:01.70 | Steve Bigelow | 2:02.45 | David Fairbanks | 2:02.48 |
| 100 m breaststroke | Richard Schroeder | 1:01.96 | Daniel Watters | 1:02.76 | David Lundberg | 1:03.22 |
| 200 m breaststroke | Mike Barrowman | 2:13.74 NR | Kirk Stackle | 2:16.49 | Jeff Kubiak | 2:16.61 |
| 100 m butterfly | Matt Biondi | 53.09 | Jay Mortenson | 53.29 | Pablo Morales | 53.52 |
| 200 m butterfly | Melvin Stewart | 1:58.86 | Mark Dean | 1:59.56 | Pablo Morales | 2:00.10 |
| 200 m IM | David Wharton | 2:00.98 NR | Bill Stapleton | 2:02.14 | Ron Karnaugh | 2:03.36 |
| 400 m IM | David Wharton | 4:16.32 | Jeff Kostoff | 4:20.23 | Jerry Frentsos | 4:20.41 |

=== Women's events ===
| Event | Gold | | Silver | | Bronze | |
|---|---|---|---|---|---|---|
| 50 m freestyle^{[a]} | Leigh Ann Fetter | 25.50 | Jill Sterkel | 25.57 | Jenny Thompson | 25.80 |
| 100 m freestyle^{[a]} | Mitzi Kremer | 55.40 | Dara Torres | 55.74 | Mary Wayte | 55.76 |
| 200 m freestyle | Mitzi Kremer | 1:58.97 | Mary Wayte | 1:59.11 | Tami Bruce | 2:00.31 |
| 400 m freestyle | Janet Evans | 4:06.43 | Tami Bruce | 4:07.89 | Mitzi Kremer | 4:08.05 |
| 800 m freestyle | Janet Evans | 8:23.59 | Tami Bruce | 8:30.00 | Andrea Hayes | 8:34.77 |
| 100 m backstroke | Betsy Mitchell | 1:02.01 | Beth Barr | 1:02.21 | Anne Mahoney | 1:02.29 |
| 200 m backstroke | Beth Barr | 2:10.87 | Andrea Hayes | 2:12.54 | Kristen Linehan | 2:12.91 |
| 100 m breaststroke | Tracey McFarlane | 1:08.91 NR | Susan Johnson | 1:09.61 | Lori Heisick | 1:10.57 |
| 200 m breaststroke | Tracey McFarlane | 2:29.82 | Susan Rapp | 2:31.01 | Susan Johnson | 2:31.08 |
| 100 m butterfly^{[a]} | Mary T. Meagher | 59.82 | Janel Jorgensen | 1:00.17 | Dara Torres | 1:00.33 |
| 200 m butterfly | Mary T. Meagher | 2:09.13 | Trina Radke | 2:11.32 | Michelle Griglione | 2:11.57 |
| 200 m IM | Mary Wayte | 2:16.28 | Whitney Hedgepeth | 2:16.36 | Summer Sanders | 2:16.63 |
| 400 m IM | Janet Evans | 4:38.58 NR | Erika Hansen | 4:42.37 | Michelle Griglione | 4:45.21 |

^{a} Angel Martino originally won the respective events, and set the American record in the 50- and 100-meter freestyle. However, Martino was removed from the Olympic team (along with her results being purged) after she tested positive for nandralone. Martino claimed the positive drug test was a result of birth control usage.

== See also ==
- United States at the 1988 Summer Olympics
- United States Olympic Trials (swimming)
- USA Swimming
