= United States Swimming National Championships =

Annual competition

The United States Swimming National Championships (a.k.a. "Nationals") are held annually, in summer. The event is organized by USA Swimming, and is held in a long course (50m) pool. In the past, and as recently as 2007, there were 2 meets annually: a Spring and a Summer Nationals. The Spring meet began as a 25-yard (short course) meet, while the Summer meet was long course. Prior to USA Swimming's creation in the late 1970s, the meet was run by the AAU.

Phillips 66 began sponsoring the meet in 1973, which continues through today although the branding of the sponsorship changed to ConocoPhillips in the early 2000s. This is one of the longest sponsorships in U.S. sports.

== Venues ==
- 1962 – Cuyahoga Falls, Ohio (men's), Chicago, Illinois (women's)
- 1963 – Oak Park, IL (men's), High Point, North Carolina (women's)
- 1964 – Palo Alto, California
- 1965 – Toledo, Ohio
- 1966 – Lincoln, Nebraska
- 1967 – Oak Park, IL (men's), Philadelphia, Pennsylvania (women's)
- 1968 – Lincoln, Nebraska
- 1969 – Louisville, Kentucky
- 1970 – Los Angeles, California
- 1971 – Houston, Texas
- 1972 – Hershey, Pennsylvania
- 1972 – Olympic Trials, Portage Park, Illinois
- 1973 – Louisville, Kentucky
- 1974 – Concord, California
- 1975 – Kansas City, Kansas
- 1976 – Philadelphia, Pennsylvania
- 1976 – Olympic Trials, Long Beach, California
- 1977 – Mission Viejo, California
- 1978 – The Woodlands, Texas (together with the US World Championships Trials)
- 1979 – Ft. Lauderdale, Florida
- 1980 – Irvine, California
- 1981 – Brown Deer, Wisconsin
- 1982 – Indianapolis, Indiana
- 1983 – Fresno, California
- 1984 – Ft. Lauderdale, Florida
- 1985 – Mission Viejo, California
- 1986 – Santa Clara, California
- 1987 – Fresno, California
- 1988 – Austin, Texas (together with US Olympic Trials)
- 1989 – Los Angeles, California
- 1990 – Austin, Texas (together with the US World Championships Trials)
- 1991 – Ft. Lauderdale, Florida
- 1992 – Mission Viejo, California
- 1993 – Austin, Texas
- 1994 – Indianapolis, Indiana
- 1995 – Pasadena, California
- 1996 – Ft. Lauderdale, Florida
- 1997 – Nashville, Tennessee
- 1998 – Fresno, California
- 1999 – Minneapolis, Minnesota
- 2000 – Indianapolis, Indiana, replaced by the US Olympic Trials
- 2001 – Fresno, California
- 2002 – Ft. Lauderdale, Florida
- 2003 – College Park, Maryland
- 2004 – Stanford, California
- 2005 – Irvine, California
- 2006 – Irvine, California
- 2007 – Indianapolis, Indiana
- 2008 – Omaha, Nebraska, incorporated into US Olympic Trials
- 2009 – Indianapolis, Indiana
- 2010 – Irvine, California
- 2011 – Palo Alto, California
- 2012 – Omaha, Nebraska, replaced by the US Olympic Trials
- 2013 – Indianapolis, Indiana
- 2014 – Irvine, California
- 2015 – San Antonio, Texas
- 2016– Omaha, Nebraska, incorporated into US Olympic Trials
- 2017 – Indianapolis, Indiana (together with the US World Championships Trials)
- 2018 – Irvine, California
- 2019 – Stanford, California
- 2021 – Omaha, Nebraska, incorporated into US Olympic Trials
- 2022 – Irvine, California (separate from the US International Team Trials)
- 2023 – Indianapolis, Indiana
- 2024 – Indianapolis, Indiana, incorporated into US Olympic Trials
- 2025 – Indianapolis, Indiana, incorporated into the US World Championships Trials
- 2026 – Irvine, California
- 2028 – Indianapolis, Indiana, incorporated into US Olympic Trials

== Men's Team Champions ==
- 1989 – Little Rock Dolphins

== Championships records ==
=== Men ===
Event	Time		Name	Club	Date	Meet	Location	Ref
50m freestyle	21.04		Caeleb Dressel	Gator Swim Club	20 June 2021	2020 U.S. Olympic Trials	Omaha, United States	
100m freestyle	46.99	h	Jack Alexy	California Golden Bears	3 June 2025	2025 Championships	Indianapolis, United States	
200m freestyle	1:43.73		Luke Hobson	Longhorn Aquatics	4 June 2025	2025 Championships	Indianapolis, United States	
400m freestyle	3:43.33		Rex Maurer	Longhorn Aquatics	6 June 2025	2025 Championships	Indianapolis, United States	
800m freestyle	7:40.34		Bobby Finke	Saint Petersburg Aquatics	1 July 2023	2023 Championships	Indianapolis, United States	
1500m freestyle	14:40.28		Bobby Finke	Saint Petersburg Aquatics	23 June 2024	2024 U.S. Olympic Trials	Indianapolis, United States	
50m backstroke	24.10		Justin Ress	Mission Viejo Nadadores	29 June 2023	2023 Championships	Indianapolis, United States	
100m backstroke	51.94		Aaron Peirsol	–	8 July 2009	2009 Championships	Indianapolis, United States	
200m backstroke	1:53.08		Aaron Peirsol	–	11 July 2009	2009 Championships	Indianapolis, United States	
50m breaststroke	26.74		Nic Fink	Metro Atlanta Aquatic Club	29 June 2023	2023 Championships	Indianapolis, United States	
100m breaststroke	58.14	sf, AM	Michael Andrew	Race Pace Club	13 June 2021	2020 U.S. Olympic Trials	Omaha, United States	
200m breaststroke	2:06.54	AM	Matthew Fallon	Penn Quakers	19 June 2024	2024 U.S. Olympic Trials	Indianapolis, United States	
50m butterfly	22.59		Ilya Kharun	Sunrise Swim Club	29 July 2026	2026 Championships	Irvine, United States	
100m butterfly	49.76	sf	Caeleb Dressel	Gator Swim Club	18 June 2021	2020 U.S. Olympic Trials	Omaha, United States	
200m butterfly	1:52.20		Michael Phelps	Club Wolverine	2 July 2008	2008 U.S. Olympic Trials	Omaha, United States	
200m individual medley	1:54.56		Ryan Lochte	–	10 July 2009	2009 Championships	Indianapolis, United States	
400m individual medley	4:05.25		Michael Phelps	Club Wolverine	29 June 2008	2008 U.S. Olympic Trials	Omaha, United States	
4×100m freestyle relay	3:17.65			–	8 August 1999			
4×200m freestyle relay	7:12.35			Club Wolverine	6 August 2005			
4×100m medley relay	3:33.70			Swimmac Carolina	6 August 2011			

Legend: # – Record awaiting ratification by USA Swimming; WR – World record; AM – Americas record;
Records not set in finals: h – heat; sf – semifinal; r – relay 1st leg; rh – relay heat 1st leg; b – B final; † – en route to final mark; so – swim-off; tt – time trial

=== Women ===
Event	Time		Name	Club	Date	Meet	Location	Ref
50m freestyle	23.60		Gretchen Walsh	North York Aquatic Club	1 August 2026	2026 Championships	Irvine, United States	
100m freestyle	51.88	AM	Anna Moesch	Greater Somerset County YMCA	28 July 2026	2026 Championships	Irvine, United States	
200m freestyle	1:54.40		Allison Schmitt	North Baltimore Aquatic Club	28 June 2012	2012 U.S. Olympic Trials	Omaha, United States	
400m freestyle	3:58.35		Katie Ledecky	Nation's Capital Swim Club	15 June 2024	2024 U.S. Olympic Trials	Indianapolis, United States	
800m freestyle	8:05.76		Katie Ledecky	Florida Gators	3 June 2025	2025 Championships	Indianapolis, United States	
1500m freestyle	15:29.64		Katie Ledecky	Florida Gators	1 July 2023	2023 Championships	Indianapolis, United States	
50m backstroke	26.97	AM	Katharine Berkoff	NC State Wolfpack	5 June 2025	2025 Championships	Indianapolis, United States	
100m backstroke	57.13	WR	Regan Smith	Longhorn Aquatics	18 June 2024	2024 U.S. Olympic Trials	Indianapolis, United States	
200m backstroke	2:03.80		Regan Smith	Arizona Sun Devils	28 June 2023	2023 Championships	Indianapolis, United States	
50m breaststroke	29.66		Lilly King	Indiana University	29 June 2017	2017 Championships	Indianapolis, United States	
100m breaststroke	1:04.72	sf	Lilly King	Indiana Swim Club	14 June 2021	2020 U.S. Olympic Trials	Omaha, United States	
200m breaststroke	2:19.46		Kate Douglass	New York Athletic Club	20 June 2024	2024 U.S. Olympic Trials	Indianapolis, United States	
50m butterfly	24.66	AM	Gretchen Walsh	North York Aquatic Club	4 June 2025	2025 Championships	Indianapolis, United States	
100m butterfly	54.76		Gretchen Walsh	North York Aquatic Club	5 June 2025	2025 Championships	Indianapolis, United States	
200m butterfly	2:04.91	sf	Regan Smith	Longhorn Aquatics	19 June 2024	2024 U.S. Olympic Trials	Indianapolis, United States	
200m individual medley	2:06.79		Kate Douglass	New York Athletic Club	22 June 2024	2024 U.S. Olympic Trials	Indianapolis, United States	
400m individual medley	4:31.12		Katie Hoff	North Baltimore	29 June 2008	2008 U.S. Olympic Trials	Omaha, United States	
4×100m freestyle relay	3:40.31			Stanford Cardinal	3 August 2011			
4×200m freestyle relay	7:58.14			Athens Bulldogs	4 August 2011			
4×100m medley relay	4:03.32			–	5 August 2006			

Legend: # – Record awaiting ratification by USA Swimming; WR – World record; AM – Americas record;
Records not set in finals: h – heat; sf – semifinal; r – relay 1st leg; rh – relay heat 1st leg; b – B final; † – en route to final mark; so – swim-off; tt – time trial
