= Bruce Gemmell (coach) =

American swimming coach (born 1960/61)

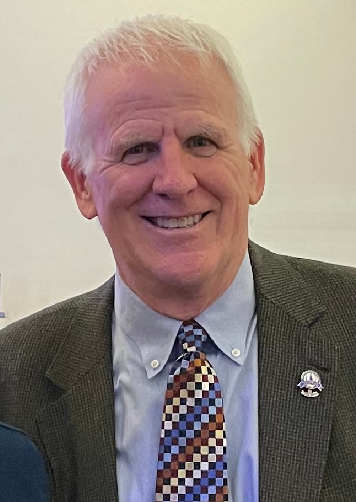
- Gemmell in 2026

Biographical details
- Born: 1960 or 1961 (age 64–65)

Playing career
- 1980–1983: Michigan

Coaching career (HC unless noted)
- c. 1984: Michigan (assistant)
- 1993–2012: Wilmington Aquatic Club
- 2012–present: Nation's Capital Swim Club
- 2016: U.S. Olympic (assistant women's)

Bruce Gemmell (born 1960 or 1961) is an American swimming coach. From Delaware, he was one of the state's top swimmers in high school before competing in college for the Michigan Wolverines. Gemmell was a Big Ten Conference champion and team captain with the Wolverines, competing from 1980 to 1983. He qualified for the United States Olympic trials twice during his competitive career. After his graduation from Michigan, he worked as an engineer before later becoming a coach at a club in Delaware. Gemmell later moved on to Nation's Capital Swim Club, where he served as coach of Katie Ledecky, who became one of the most accomplished swimmers of all time. Gemmell's children, Andrew and Erin, are both Olympians.

== Early life ==
Gemmell was born in 1960 or 1961, and is from Shellburne, Delaware. He grew up swimming and joined the Wilmington Aquatic Club in 1968 at age eight, learning under coach Bob Mattson. He was successful at many local and age group tournaments, including the Middle Atlantic championships, the AAU Junior Olympics, the Eastern All-Star Swimming Championships, and Delaware state tournaments. The News Journal writer Matt Zabitka stated that Gemmell "kept collecting honors and titles like grocery shoppers collect discount coupons". He was champion in the 200 backstroke at the 1978 Middle Atlantic Championships, where he was honored as the meet's most valuable player, and was also a junior national champion that year. Gemmell also set two records at the 32nd Delaware State Summer Swim Meet Championships and was selected outstanding male swimmer at the 1979 Middle Atlantic Senior Short Course Championships. He attended Mount Pleasant High School, where he helped the swim team win two state championships and three Blue Hen Conference championships while going undefeated in three seasons. Gemmell held four state records at the time of his graduation from high school in 1979.

== College career ==
After high school, Gemmell enrolled at the University of Michigan and studied mechanical engineering. There, he competed for the Michigan Wolverines swimming and diving team and was a top performer in backstroke and individual medley events. As a freshman in 1980, he competed at the Big Ten Conference Championships, finishing fourth in the 400 individual medley along with seventh-place finishes in the 200 backstroke and 200 individual medley. That year, he also competed at the senior national championships, which would have been the trials for the 1980 Summer Olympics if not for the American boycott. Gemmell finished 25th at the nationals in the 200 m backstroke.

Two years later, Gemmell broke two school records at the Big Ten Championships, winning the silver medal in the 200 backstroke with a time of 1:50.64 and placing fourth in the 200 individual medley with a time of 1:51.44; he also was the Big Ten champion in the 400-yard individual medley with a time of 3:57.96. He competed in five events at the 1982 NCAA Division I Men's Swimming and Diving Championships. Gemmell, a team captain at Michigan, helped the Wolverines win the Big Ten 800-yard freestyle relay championship in 1983 while going undefeated. He also finished second at the Big Ten Championships in the 200 individual medley and 200 backstroke. He later competed in multiple events at the 1983 NCAA Championships, including a 13th-place finish with the 800 freestyle relay team. After his college career, Gemmell participated at the 1984 United States Olympic trials, but did not qualify for the Olympics. He also spent one year as an assistant coach to Jon Urbanchek at Michigan, while completing post-graduate work.

During his career, Gemmell stood at 6 feet 1 inch (1.85 m) and weighed 185 pounds (84 kg).

== Engineering and coaching career ==
After a year of coaching, Gemmell entered engineering on the suggestion of Urbanchek, who discouraged becoming a coach. He worked at several different companies as an engineering manager and consultant, working in product design and management. His employers included Siemens and Kimberly-Clark. There are 11 patents on which Gemmell's name appears. Among his inventions are toilet paper products. Later during his coaching career, he told The New York Times, "It’s funny – I go into the restrooms at meets and I look at the towel dispensers that are hanging on the walls, and the soap dispensers, and I'm like, 'Oh, yeah, I've got a patent on that one.'"

Gemmell became a coach again in 1993 with the Wilmington Aquatic Club, later known as the Delaware Swim Team. He had brought his young son, Andrew, for classes, and Bob Mattson requested he "help out one or two nights a week," a "role [that expanded] until soon he was immersed in workout planning and travel projects for the team". In subsequent years, he worked both as a swim coach while remaining an engineer, before deciding to work only part-time as an engineer in 2004, following the birth of his daughter Erin. The Times noted that he performed "a juggling act, burning vacation time from his engineering job to attend out-of-town swim meets". Gemmell "guided a flock of swimmers to the Olympic trials" as the Delaware Swim Team senior national coach for seven years. Among those he coached was his son Andrew, who became an Olympian and World Championship medalist. Gemmell became a full-time swimming coach in 2010, that year serving as coach of the U.S. at the Junior Pan Pacific Swimming Championships.

In 2012, Gemmell became a coach at Nation's Capital Swim Club, where he replaced Yuri Suguiyama, coach of then-15-year-old Katie Ledecky, who went on to be one of the greatest swimmers of all time. He remained Ledecky's coach until the end of 2016. The Times noted that "For four years, Gemmell was more than Ledecky's coach. He was her chief of staff, the man responsible for setting and overseeing her audacious agenda of becoming the first swimmer since Debbie Meyer in 1968 to win the 200-, 400- and 800-meter freestyles in the same Olympics. Ledecky ... worked long and hard — and endured a thousand tiny failures along the way, according to Gemmell — to spin their shared goal into four golds." Under Gemmell's coaching, Ledecky won five gold medals at the world championships in 2015 and broke 13 long-course world records, while winning five medals, including four gold, at the 2016 Summer Olympics. Gemmell also helped the Nation's Capital Swim have "one of the top age group programs in the country". He was honored as the American Swimming Coaches Association Coach of the Year in 2013, 2014, and 2015, becoming the second person after Eddie Reese to win the award three straight times. As of 2024, his club held the distinction of being a USA Swimming Gold Medal Team for 12 straight years. Gemmell has also served on several U.S. coaching staffs, including at two world championships and the 2016 Olympics.

Gemmell was selected for induction to the Delaware Sports Museum and Hall of Fame in 2026.

== Personal life ==
Gemmell married Debra Norris in 1988. They had a son, Andrew, who competed at the 2012 Summer Olympics. He later married Barbara Harris, a former Northwestern Wildcats swimmer, and they had a daughter, Erin, who won a silver medal at the 2024 Summer Olympics.
