= Industry Hills Aquatic Club =

USA Swimming Club in City of Industry, California

Coordinates: 34.0177715°N 117.9211736°W

The Industry Hills Aquatic Club's team logo, as depicted, here, on a swim cap.

The Industry Hills Aquatic Club (IHAC) was a prominent USA Swimming club located in the City of Industry, California, from 1979 until August 2005. For almost three decades, the Club was a successful training ground for a considerable number of athletes, some achieving success at the highest levels of the sport, both nationally and internationally, such as the Olympic Games. In addition to swimming, the organization included water polo and diving teams composed of athletes achieving similar success. The Aquatic Center's pools also served the community as a popular venue for high school swim meets, youth swim lessons, and U.S. Masters Swimming.

The organization ceased to exist in 2005 when the City of Industry decided to demolish the Industry Hills Aquatics Center. The pool was demolished four years later, in March 2009.

== Industry Hills Aquatic Center ==
The Industry Hills Aquatic Center complex included two pools, an eight-lane 25-yard shallow warm-up pool and a 50-meter olympic pool with seating for 3,000 spectators inclined on cement bleachers built upon an earthen embankment on the north side of the pool. A 10-meter diving tower stood on the southern side of the olympic pool, most famously used in the Rodney Dangerfield film, Back to School, and later in the music video of the Sum 41 song, "In Too Deep". The swim complex shared locker facilities with a 17-court tennis facility that bordered the northern side of the swimming pools.

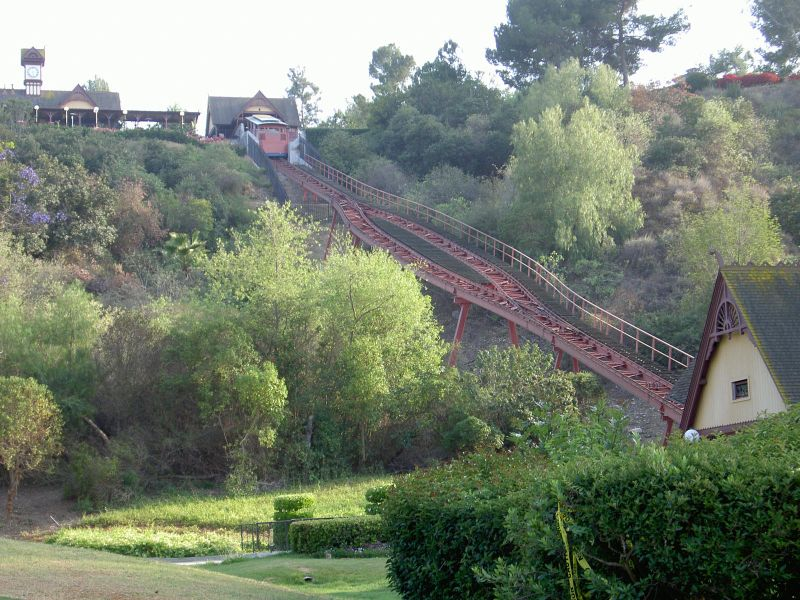
Funicular railway for golfers and their carts.

The swim complex, designed by Tom Dakon with many innovative features conducive to competitive swimming, was just one part of a much larger adaptive reuse project—the Industry Hills Recreation Center development—currently known as the Pacific Palms Resort, formerly a Sheraton Hotels and Resorts property. The development comprises over 650 acres (2.6 km^{2}), which include two golf courses; a driving range; a 292-room resort hotel tower; two restaurants; notable convention facilities; an 11,000-square-foot (1,000 m^{2}) spa; an equestrian center (the Industry Hills Expo Center); and one of the few funicular incline railways in the world, constructed to transport golf carts between holes on the complex greens.

Prior to its current form, the site was a large refuse disposal site that accumulated some 3.5 million tons of waste from 1951 until 1969, characterized by "subterranean fires, pollution, exposed debris, unsightly cut slopes, and barren earth." Extensive grading, contouring and landscaping transformed the site into a lush green-space development that serves as an attractive setting for the facilities located at the site. This successful adaptive reuse has been noted and followed by many other similar projects due to its innovative design, construction, landscaping and use of reclaimed water and methane gas. In 1981, the development was chosen by Civil Engineering Magazine as the Outstanding Civil Engineering Achievement of 1981.

== Olympic Athletes Affiliated With Industry Hills ==
- Jill Sterkel: American Olympic swimmer
- Jenna Johnson: American Olympic swimmer
- Jens-Peter Berndt: West German Olympic swimmer
- Brian Roney: American Olympic swimmer (qualified for boycotted 1980 Games)
- Natalie Coughlin: American Olympic swimmer
- Michelle Ford: Australian Olympic swimmer
- George Giziotis: Greek Olympic swimmer
- Jeff Kostoff: American Olympic swimmer
- Terry Schroeder: American Olympic water polo player, silver medalist and team captain of the United States olympic water polo team in both 1984 and 1988, but perhaps most recognizable as the model for the bronze torso sculpture at the gateway to the 1984 Olympic Stadium, the Los Angeles Coliseum.
- Craig Wilson: American Olympian water polo player
- Michael Miao: Chinese Taipei Olympic swimmer (1984)

== Aquatics Directors / Head Coaches ==
- Donald Lamont
- Ed Spencer
- John Reese
- Michael Gautreau
- Richard Shipherd

== Demise ==
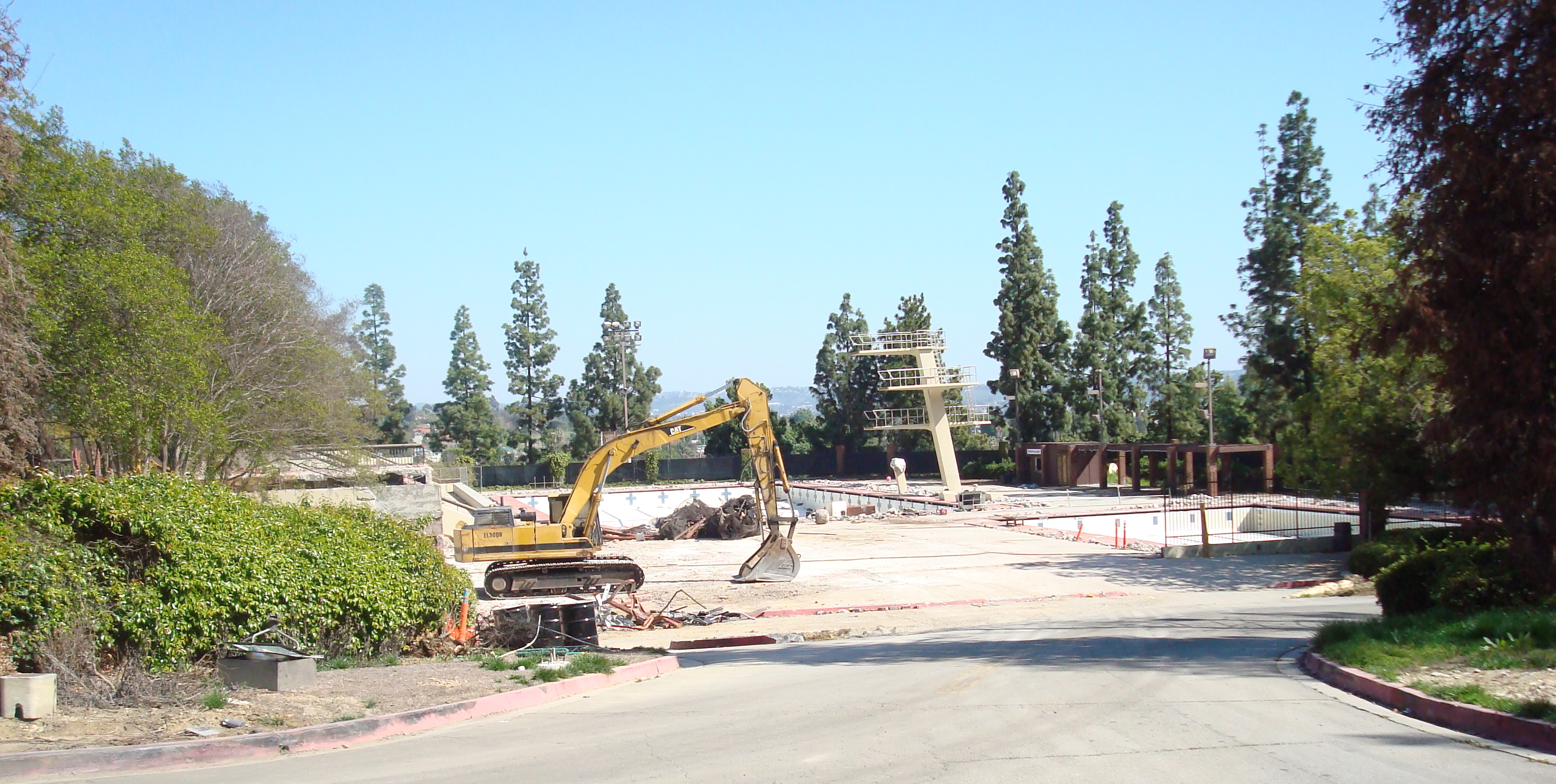
Demolition of the Industry Hills Aquatic Center on March 10, 2009.

Despite the efforts of many individuals to save the noted and aesthetically pleasing facility, the organization met its demise as utility prices and maintenance costs deemed the pools financially impracticable to operate. In 2005, the team ceased to exist, with remaining swimmers and coaches moving to a newly constructed pool and team in La Mirada, California.

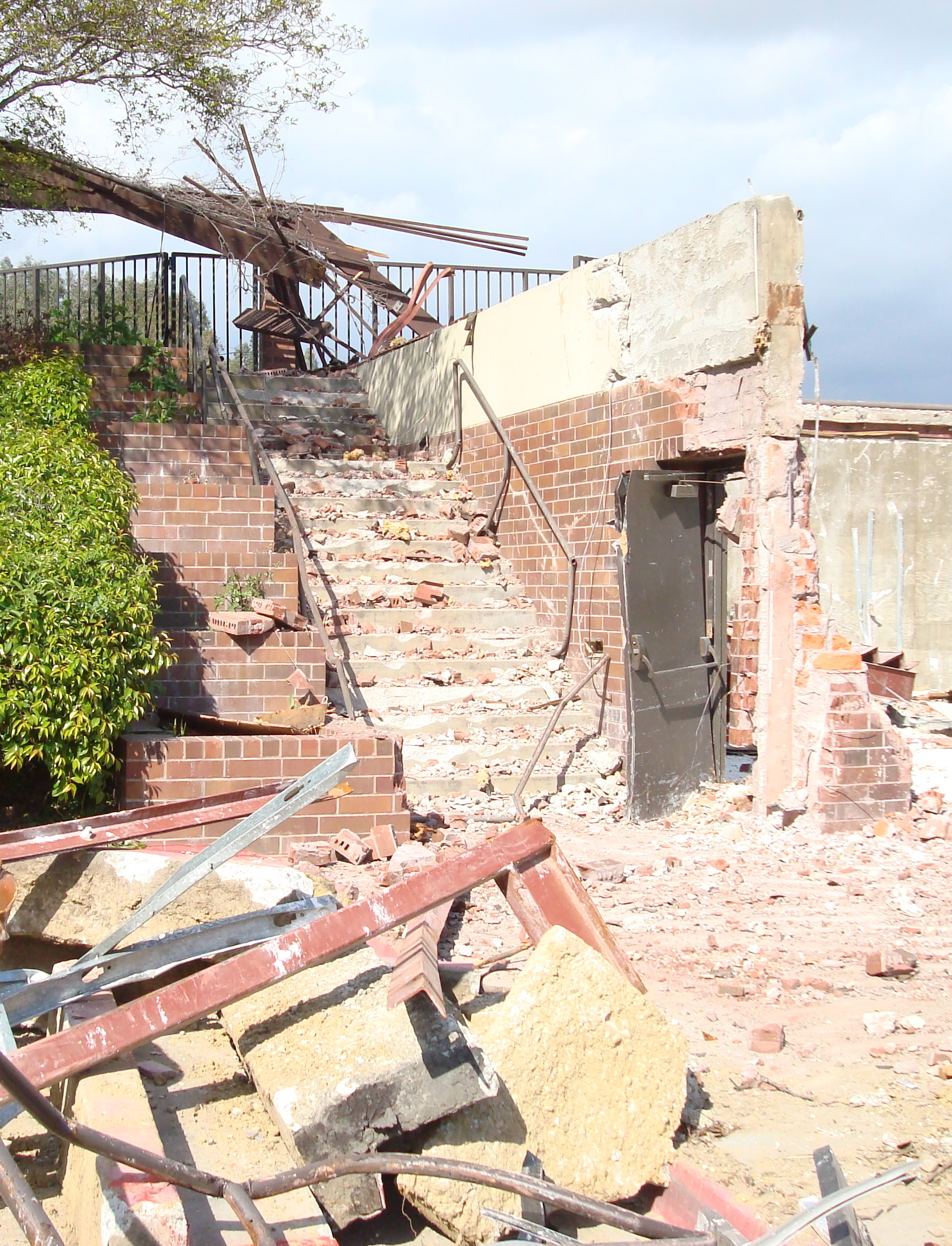
Stairs connecting the aquatics center to the tennis center, with former locker room facilities to the right.

For a number of years leading up to the ultimate demolition of the facility, proponents delayed closure despite mounting financial costs upwards of $100,000 per year for utilities alone. The primary reason for this expense was energy required for heating. The complex's two pools required rather large boilers to heat their water, which were most recently replaced at a cost of $142,000. At its initial inception, the pool depended upon methane gas to fuel its boilers. This was a readily available source of energy cheaply piped from the decomposing garbage deposited at the site during its prior use as a refuse dump. However, as at other refuse dump sites, the methane gas slowly diminished and became a nonviable source of energy to heat the facility. Thus, other much more expensive petroleum was necessary to fuel the pool heaters' boilers. Directly prior to closure, the Pacific Palms carried $220,000 in debt for just one year of operation. Concurrent with the complete demolition and removal of the swimming pools, the Pacific Palms also chose to completely remove the 17 tennis courts and adjoining tennis club, pro shop and cafe.

The City of Industry and Pacific Palms plan to redevelop the former aquatic center for another use that has not yet been publicly disclosed. The site of the former aquatic center is located at the base of the Pacific Palms Resort, at the southwest corner of Industry Hills Parkway and Azusa Boulevard in the City of Industry, California 91744.

== See also ==
- Industry Hills Golf Club
