= Troy Dalbey =

American swimmer (born 1968)

Personal information
- Full name: Troy Lane Dalbey
- National team: United States
- Born: September 19, 1968 (age 57)
- Height: 6 ft 4 in (1.93 m)
- Weight: 170 lb (77 kg)

Sport
- Sport: Swimming
- Strokes: Freestyle
- College team: University of Florida; Arizona State University
Medal record
Men's swimming
Representing United States
Olympic Games
Gold medal – first place	1988 Seoul	4×100 m freestyle
Gold medal – first place	1988 Seoul	4×200 m freestyle
World Championships (LC)
Silver medal – second place	1991 Perth	4×200 m freestyle
Pan Pacific Championships
Gold medal – first place	1987 Brisbane	4×100 m freestyle
Gold medal – first place	1987 Brisbane	4×200 m freestyle
Gold medal – first place	1991 Edmonton	4×200 m freestyle

Troy Lane Dalbey (born September 19, 1968) is an American former competition swimmer, two-time Olympic champion, and former world record-holder.

Dalbey attended the University of Florida in Gainesville, Florida, where he swam for coach Randy Reese's Florida Gators swimming and diving team in National Collegiate Athletic Association (NCAA) competition from 1986 to 1987. In 1987, he was named an All-American in the 50, 100 and 200-yard freestyle events, the 400-yard medley relay, and the 400 and 800-yard freestyle relays, and was a member of the Gators' 800-yard freestyle relay team that won the NCAA title that year.

Dalbey won two gold medals at the 1988 Summer Olympics in Seoul, South Korea. He won his first gold medal as a member of the winning U.S. team in the men's 4×100 meter freestyle relay, together with teammates Chris Jacobs, Tom Jager and Matt Biondi. He won a second gold medal with fellow Americans Matt Cetlinski, Doug Gjertsen and Matt Biondi in the men's 4×200 meter freestyle relay. Dalbey and his American relay teammates set new world records in the event finals of both the 4×100-meter (3:16.53) and the 4×200-meter (7:12.51) events. While celebrating his victories with Doug Gjertsen in a Korean bar, they removed a marble lion's head wall decoration and were arrested by the Korean police. Dalbey and Gjertsen resigned from the U.S. Olympic team, apologized to their Korean hosts in writing, and no formal charges were filed by the Korean prosecutor; Dalbey subsequently received an 18-month suspension from competitive swimming.

Dalbey transferred to Arizona State University in Tempe, Arizona after the 1988 Olympics, and finished his college swimming career swimming for the Arizona State Sun Devils swimming and diving team. He received four more All-American honors as a Sun Devil swimmer in 1991.

After Dalbey retired from competition swimming, he spent several years as a swim coach, helping train other elite level swimmers, including 2 who competed in the 1996 Summer Olympic Games in Atlanta.

He now has 3 children, Jade, Tess and Tristan Dalbey. He is currently an executive in the renewable energy industry, residing in Scottsdale, AZ.

== See also ==
- List of Arizona State University alumni
- List of multiple Olympic gold medalists
- List of Olympic medalists in swimming (men)
- List of University of Florida Olympians
- List of World Aquatics Championships medalists in swimming (men)
- World record progression 4 × 100 metres freestyle relay
- World record progression 4 × 200 metres freestyle relay
