= Andrew Gemmell =

American swimmer (born 1991)

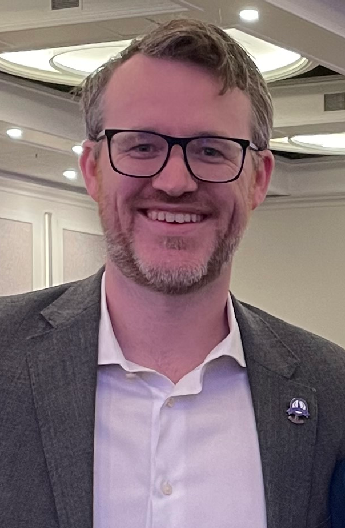
- Gemmell in 2026

Personal information
- Full name: Andrew Douglas Gemmell
- National team: United States
- Born: February 20, 1991 (age 35) Columbia, Maryland, U.S.
- Height: 6 ft 0 in (1.83 m)
- Weight: 160 lb (73 kg)
- Spouse: Jordan Mattern

Sport
- Sport: Swimming
- Strokes: Freestyle
- Club: Nation's Capital Swim Club
- College team: University of Georgia
- Coach: Bruce Gemmell, Harvey Humphries
Medal record
Men's swimming
Representing the United States
World Championships (LC)
Gold medal – first place	2011 Shanghai	5 km team
Silver medal – second place	2009 Rome	10 km open water
Pan Pacific Championships
Gold medal – first place	2014 Gold Coast	10 km open water
Pan American Games
Silver medal – second place	2015 Toronto	1500 m freestyle

Andrew Douglas Gemmell (born February 20, 1991) is an American competition swimmer who specialized in long-distance freestyle events. He swam for the University of Georgia, helping then to place 5th in the NCAA in 2014, and was a member of the 2012 United States Olympic Team, where he competed in the 1,500-meter freestyle event at the 2012 Summer Olympics in London. At the Olympics, he finished ninth with a time of 14:59:05, missing the finals by one place. He took several distance swimming medals, with a gold at the 5 km team event in the 2011 World Aquatics Championships in Shanghai, and took medals at the Pan Pacific Championships in 2014 and the Pan American Games in 2015 in the 1500 m, 5 km and 10 km events.

== Personal life ==
Gemmell was born in Columbia, Maryland, the son of Bruce, a former captain of the University of Michigan swimming team, and Debra Gemmell. He started swimming competitively at the age of nine. He graduated from Charter School of Wilmington in Wilmington, Delaware in 2009. He is currently married to fellow UGA swimming alum and World Champion, Jordan Mattern. Gemmell's father Bruce Gemmell, was the Coach for the Delaware Swim Team in Wilmington, Delaware from 2006 to 2012, and later coached for the Nation's Capital Swim Club. Andrew swam for the Delaware Swim team and the Nation's Capital Swim Club for a period and was coached by his father. Gemmell continued to swim at times for the Nation's Capital Swim Team, where Olympic athlete and medal winner Katie Ledecky also swam and was coached by Gemmell's father. Andrew would occasionally train with Ledecky to challenge her and was swimming with her at the Nation's Capital Swim Club as late as 2016, as he continued to train in his mid-twenties.

In 2008, he placed third in the Atlantic City Pageant Ocean Swim with a time of 24:20. He performed well, but would grow to become more accustomed to open water competition. In 2007, at only 16, he won the 35th Harry Yates Atlantic Swim near the Albany Avenue Bridge in Atlantic City with a time of 14:06.

== College career ==
Gemmell received an athletic scholarship to attend the University of Georgia, where he majored in economics and swam for Georgia Bulldogs swimming and diving team in National Collegiate Athletic Association (NCAA) competition in 2010, and again from 2012 to 2014, after red-shirting during the 2010–11 school year. His personal bests include a 500-yard freestyle time of 4:17.75; a 1,650-yard freestyle time of 14:41.86; and a 400-yard individual medley in 3:44.89 (all times from the NCAA Championships). He completed his senior year in 2013–14, graduating in 2014 with a degree in economics. As a Senior Captain, Gemmell helped Georgia attain a fifth-place finish at March 2014's NCAA Championships, the school's best finish since 1997. At University of Georgia, he was coached by Harvey Humphries, who said "Gemmell was essentially an assistant coach because of his deep knowledge of the sport, and dedicated study of strategy and training". With an 3.86 college GPA, Gemmell was awarded scholarships for post-graduate study from both the NCAA and SEC.

== International career ==
At the 2008 FINA Youth World Swimming Championships, Gemmell won gold in the boy's 400-meter individual medley with a time of 4:21:58.

== 2009 World Aquatics 10 Km Silver medal ==
At the 2009 World Aquatics Championships in Rome, Gemmell won silver in the men's 10-kilometer open water race. In the 5-kilometer race, Gemmell finished fifth. Gemmell is a recipient of the United States 2009 male open-water swimmer of the year award, and was nominated for the 2009 Golden Goggle Awards as breakout swimmer of the year. At the 2010 Pan Pacific Swimming Championships, Gemmell placed fifth in the 1,500-meter freestyle and eleventh in the 400-meter individual medley.

== 2011 World Aquatics Team Gold medal ==
At the 2011 Shanghai World Championships, around July 21 of 2011, Andrew finished with a team gold medal in the 5 km swim. The other team competitors were Ashley Twichell and Sean Ryan.

=== 2011 US National Championships, 1500 m win ===
At the 2011 ConocoPhillips U.S. National Championships at Stanford, California in August 2011, Gemmell won the 1500m free while attached to the Delaware Swim Team. He finished fourth in the 400m IM and in the 400m free placed eighth. He finished the 1500m free with a time of 15:01:31.02.

== 2008, 2012, 2016 Olympic Trials ==
=== 2008 Olympic trials ===
At the 2008 Olympic trials, where he qualified for the 1500 m event, he swam in the heats for the 200 Butterfly, 1,500 M freestyle, and his best event the 400 IM, qualifying for a spot in Monterrey, Mexico's World Youth Games representing the U.S. Team. On July 6, 2008, he clocked the 10th fastest time, 4:21.85 in the 400 IM heats, missing the finals by 8 tenths of a second. He was only 17, and going into his Senior year in High School. In the 1,500, he was the 26th seed with a 15:38:91 qualifying time, among 74 entrants, and he had worked diligently that summer to shave 40 seconds off his time, but did not qualify for the Olympic team in the event.

==== 2012 Olympics, 1500 meter ====
At the 2012 U.S. Olympic Trials in Omaha, Nebraska, the U.S. qualifying meet for the 2012 Olympics, Gemmell made the U.S. Olympic team for the first time by finishing first in the 1,500-meter freestyle with a time of 14:52.19. At the 2012 Summer Olympics in London, he placed ninth in the preliminary heats of the 1,500-meter freestyle with a time of 14:59.05, and did not advance among the top eight to the event final. According to one source, Gemmell qualified for the Olympic Trials in 2008, 2012, and 2016 but he did not qualify for the team in 2012 or 2016.

=== 2016 Olympic trials ===
He was ranked only 6th going into the 1500 M qualifying rounds at the 2016 U.S. Olympic Trials, with a time of 15:07:82, fifteen seconds slower than what he swam in the 2012 Olympics. Gemmell's swim of 15:31:13 was not his fastest for that year, and ranked him 21st of 97 competitors, but only the top eight finishers made the semi-final cut. In the 400 freestyle, Gemmell placed 38th with a time of 3:57:68.

== 2014 Pan Pacific Swimming Championships ==
At the Pan Pacific Swimming Championships on August 31, 2014, Andrew placed first in the 10 km event, at Kihei Beach at Maui, Hawaii with a time of 1:51:11. He finished first in a field of 9. With a clear victory, his time was nearly a minute in front of Jarrod Poort of Australia, the silver medalist.

=== 2014 FINA 10km Swimming World Cup ===
On Saturday, June 28, 2014, Gemmell was unable to finish the FINA 10K Marathon Swimming World Cup, by his account due to the water temperature of 62 degrees. Nonetheless, he led the pack for much of the first two laps of the six lap race before dropping out about half-way through the race.

== 2015 Pan American Games ==
At the Pan American Games in 2015, Andrew won a silver medal in Toronto in the 1500 Meter freestyle in July in a time of 15:6:43.5, just three seconds behind Ryan Cochrane of Canada.

In one of his last international competitions, Andrew placed 17th of 63 in the FINA World Championships on July 14, 2017, in Budapest in a 5 km swim with a time of 54:59.

=== USA Open Water National Championship ===
Andrew received a first-place finish at the USA Swimming Open Water National Championships in a 10 km swim on April 27, 2012, at Miromar Lakes in Fort Myers Florida with a time of 1:58:03. He finished about 15 yards ahead of second-place Janardan Burns, a distance he opened after turning at the last buoy. Gemmel claimed the pack at front was tight throughout much of the race.

On June 13, 2014, he received another first-place finish in a 10 km swim at the USA Open Water National Championships at Castaic Lake in Castaic, California, with a time of 1:50:45, beating out around 50 other swimmers. His win at the race helped him win a berth at the Pan Pacific Championships in Australia. That August 31, he won the Pan Pacific 10 km Race at Kehai Beach in Mauii, Hawaii.

On April 8, 2016, in the USA Swimming Open Water National Championships, Andrew finished first in a 10 km swim at Miromar Lakes in Fort Myers, Florida with a time of 1:53:53. However, since Gemmell's timing chip was torn off during the rough race, second place Ferry Weertman was declared the winner and Gemmell was disqualified. USA Swimming officials overturned the ruling, however, and decided to award him the 10 km victory on April 9–10.

In the FINA World Championships on July 14, 2017, as Gemmell neared his 27th birthday at the end of his competitive career, he placed 17th of 63 in the 5 km swim in Budapest with a time of 54:59.

=== Post-graduate studies ===
In the fall of 2016, Gemmell planned to attend graduate studies at Georgetown University, majoring in Applied Economics, and utilizing his post-graduate scholarship funds.

As a supporter and observer, on August 20–22 of 2019, Andrew attended the UANA Pan American Junior Open Water Championships in Wisconsin's Lake Andrea for Pan American swim athletes between 14 and 20 years of age.

== See also ==
- List of University of Georgia people
