= Quintarelli =

Quintarelli (Italian pronunciation: [kwintaˈrɛlli]) is an Italian surname. Notable people with the surname include:

- Cristina Quintarelli (born 1963), Italian swimmer
- Ronnie Quintarelli (born 1979), Italian racecar driver
- Stefano Quintarelli (born 1965), Italian IT expert
