= Matt Cetlinski =

American swimmer (born 1964)

Personal information
- Full name: Matthew J. Cetlinski
- Nickname: "Matt"
- National team: United States
- Born: October 4, 1964 (age 61) Lake Worth Beach, Florida, U.S.
- Height: 6 ft 0 in (183 cm)
- Weight: 161 lb (73 kg)

Sport
- Sport: Swimming
- Strokes: Freestyle
- Club: Wellington Swim Club
- College team: University of Florida
Medal record
Men's swimming
Representing the United States
Olympic Games
Gold medal – first place	1988 Seoul	4x200 m freestyle relay
Pan Pacific Championships
Gold medal – first place	1987 Brisbane	400 m freestyle
Gold medal – first place	1987 Brisbane	4x200 m freestyle
Pan American Games
Silver medal – second place	1983 Caracas	400 m freestyle

Matthew J. Cetlinski (born October 4, 1964) is an American former competition swimmer, Olympic gold medalist, and former world record-holder.

Cetlinski was born in Lake Worth Beach, Florida. He attended Cardinal Newman High School in West Palm Beach, Florida. As a junior swimmer, he trained with the Wellington Wahoos Swim Club in nearby Wellington, Florida.

Cetlinski accepted an athletic scholarship to attend the University of Florida in Gainesville, Florida, where he swam for coach Randy Reese's Florida Gators swimming and diving team in National Collegiate Athletic Association (NCAA) and Southeastern Conference (SEC) competition from 1983 to 1986. He was a member of the Gators' 1983 and 1984 NCAA men's championship teams, as well as four consecutive SEC championships teams. As Gator swimmer, he won the NCAA championship in the 500-yard freestyle event in 1986 and received eight All-American honors over the course of his collegiate career. Cetlinski graduated from Florida with a bachelor's degree in religion in 1987, and was inducted into the University of Florida Athletic Hall of Fame as a "Gator Great" in 1997.

Cetlinski won a gold medal at the 1988 Summer Olympics in Seoul, South Korea, where he was a member of the first-place U.S. team in the men's 4×200-meter freestyle relay, together with teammates Troy Dalbey, Doug Gjertsen and Matt Biondi who swam in the final, as well as Craig Oppel and Dan Jorgensen who swam in the qualifying heats of the event. The Americans set a new world record of 7:12.51 in the event final. Individually, Cetlinski also placed fourth in the men's 400-meter freestyle (3:48.09) and the men's 1,500-meter freestyle (15:06.42).

Cetlinski now works as an acupuncturist in Gainesville, Florida.

== See also ==
- List of Olympic medalists in swimming (men)
- List of University of Florida alumni
- List of University of Florida Athletic Hall of Fame members
- List of University of Florida Olympians
- World record progression 4 × 200 metres freestyle relay
