= C. Rob Orr =

American swimmer and coach

Rob Orr
Biographical details
- Born: September, 1950
- Education: University of Southern California

Playing career
- 1968-1972: University of Southern California; Coach Peter Daland
- Position: butterfly stroke

Coaching career (HC unless noted)
- 1975-1977 circa: University of Southern California; Asst. Coach
- 1977-1979: Dad's Club AAU Swim Team
- 1979-2019: Princeton University

Head coaching record
- Overall: 322-57 .85 Win Pct. As of 2017, (Princeton)

Accomplishments and honors

Championships
- 23 Ivy League Championships

Awards
- 6 x EISL Coach of the Year; 2015 CSCAA Richard Steadman Award; 1990 Master Coach Award (CSCAA)

Charles Robison "Rob" Orr (born September 1950) was the men's swim coach at Princeton University from 1979 to 2019 where he led the team to 23 Ivy League Championships. Before arriving at Princeton, Orr had been an assistant coach for the University of Southern California for three years, and then a Head Coach at Dad's Swim Club in Houston, Texas.

== Swimming career ==
Orr started competitive swimming later than most, around age 13. He graduated from San Gabriel High School in California in 1968. As a senior in high school, Orr earned All-America status in the 100-yard butterfly. His time of 52.9 seconds placed him sixth in the nation, five spots behind Mark Spitz.

=== College swimming at USC ===
After High School graduation, Orr went on to have a successful swimming career, receiving a scholarship from the University of Southern California where he swam under Hall of Fame Coach Peter Daland. His time at USC included selection to the 1971 Pan American Games swim team representing the United States in Cali, Colombia; Orr was the silver medalist in the 200-meter butterfly in Cali. As a senior at USC, he was voted team captain by his teammates and earned All-America status in the 200-yard butterfly, placing fifth in the nation. He was an All American in the 200-yard butterfly for four successive years.

At the 1972 NCAA championship, Orr placed fifth to Mark Spitz's winning record time in the 200-yard butterfly, receiving a 1:51.808, which lagged behind Spitz by 3.3 seconds. Orr completed his Bachelors at USC in 1972, and then completed a Masters in Physical Education from USC.

=== 1972 Olympic trials ===
In 1972, Orr competed in the 1972 Olympic Trials in Chicago where he placed 15th overall in the preliminary heats.

== Coaching swimming ==
=== Early swim coaching at USC, Dad's Club ===
Beginning his coaching career with a great learning experience, he was an Assistant coach at USC for three years from around 1975-1977, where he was mentored by Hall of Fame Coach Peter Daland during the period the Trojans won three consecutive NCAA Swimming and Diving Championships.

He coached at Dad's Club AAU Swim Club in Houston, Texas from around 1977-1979. A high performing group, under Orr's leadership Dad's Club took first place in a competition between twenty-three teams at the South All-Star Qualifying Swim Meet in Edinburg, in South Texas, in November '78.

=== Coaching career at Princeton ===
After being hired by Athletic Director Bob Myslik, Orr served as the head men's swim coach at Princeton University from 1979-2019, announcing his retirement from the school at the end of his tenure at the age of 68. With outstanding performance in the Ivy League Conference during Orr's coaching tenure, the Princeton team shared or won the Ivy title 11 of 12 years, and had eight seasons with a perfect 7-0 Ivy League record in dual-meets. His overall 330 dual meet victories placed him at his retirement as the men’s coach with the third most victories in NCAA Division I competition. During Orr's tenure, Princeton had 23 Ivy League team championships, 38 individual All-Americans, 24 All-American relays, and five Olympians.

In July 1980, with extra time due to America having boycotted the Moscow Olympics, Orr worked as a swim coach and staff director at a six-week summer swim camp at Ocean Beach in New London, Connecticut along with Princeton swim coach Frank Keefe. During his service at Princeton, he was the head coach at the 1991 Olympic Festival and in 1993 was the women's head coach for the U.S. national junior team.

Orr's Princeton teams have won 19 EISL/Ivy League championships, most recently in 2012. His career record in dual meets, at Princeton as of 2017 was 322-57, which included a 115-2 record at Princeton's DeNunzio Pool (the first loss came after a 107 meet winning streak in DeNunzio). Orr coached the Tigers to five top 20 finishes at the NCAA Championships. In 1989 and 1990, Princeton's 200 medley relay team won the event at NCAA's in American record time. Orr has been described as "part nutty professor [and] part genius" and is also "one of the most beloved." As of 2019, Orr's 330 wins in dual meets make him the swim coach with the third most wins in Division I swimming athletics history.

=== Outstanding swimmers ===
Orr coached a number of Olympians, beginning with 1988 200 backstroke Olympic finalist Dan Veatch, 1992 Olympic double gold medalist Nelson Diebel, Juan Pablo Valdivieso a 2000 and 2004 Olympian, and 2008 Olympians Bryan Tay and his assistant coach at Princeton Doug Lennox.

In service to the swimming community, Orr served on the NCAA Swimming and Diving Committee, and was the head women’s coach for the 1993 U.S. national junior team.

=== Honors ===
In 2015, Orr was awarded the Richard E. Steadman Award by the College Swimming Coaches Association, a distinction annually given to a coach who has gone the furthest to spread happiness in the sport of swimming and diving. Orr has been the EISL or Ivy League coach of the year six times.

== Personal life ==
Orr currently resides in Pennington, New Jersey with his wife Benji with whom he has two sons, Braden and Scotty.
