= Jenna Johnson (swimmer) =

American swimmer

Personal information
- Full name: Jenna Leigh Johnson
- National team: United States
- Born: September 11, 1967 (age 59) Santa Rosa, California, U.S.
- Height: 6 ft 2 in (1.88 m)
- Weight: 139 lb (63 kg)

Sport
- Sport: Swimming
- Strokes: Butterfly, freestyle
- Club: Industry Hills Aquatic Club
- College team: Stanford University
Medal record
Women's swimming
Representing the United States
Olympic Games
Gold medal – first place	1984 Los Angeles	4x100 m freestyle
Gold medal – first place	1984 Los Angeles	4x100 m medley
Silver medal – second place	1984 Los Angeles	100 m butterfly
World Championships (LC)
Silver medal – second place	1986 Madrid	100 m freestyle
Silver medal – second place	1986 Madrid	4x100 m freestyle
Silver medal – second place	1986 Madrid	4x100 m medley
Pan Pacific Championships
Gold medal – first place	1985 Tokyo	100 m freestyle
Gold medal – first place	1985 Tokyo	4x100 m freestyle
Gold medal – first place	1987 Brisbane	4x100 m freestyle
Gold medal – first place	1989 Tokyo	4x100 m medley
Silver medal – second place	1987 Brisbane	100 m freestyle
Bronze medal – third place	1987 Brisbane	100 m butterfly
Bronze medal – third place	1989 Tokyo	100 m butterfly
Summer Universiade
Gold medal – first place	1985 Kobe	4x100 m freestyle
Gold medal – first place	1985 Kobe	4x100 m medley
Silver medal – second place	1985 Kobe	100 m freestyle

Jenna Leigh Johnson (born September 11, 1967) is an American former competition swimmer and Olympic gold medalist.

As a 16-year-old, Johnson represented the United States at the 1984 Summer Olympics in Los Angeles, California. She won three medals: a gold medal in the women's 4×100-meter freestyle relay, a gold medal in the 4×100-meter medley relay, and a silver medal in the 100-meter butterfly.

She attended and swam for Ursuline High School in Santa Rosa her freshman and sophomore years. She swam for the Santa Rosa Neptunes Swim Club in Santa Rosa from age 12-15. She is an alumna of Whittier Christian High School, where in 1984 she set the national record of 53.95 seconds in the 100-yard butterfly and the D1 record of 23.07 seconds in the 50-yard freestyle. While living in Southern California, she trained at the Industry Hills Aquatic Club in the City of Industry, California. She received an athletic scholarship to attend Stanford University, where she swam for the Stanford Cardinal swimming and diving team in National Collegiate Athletic Association (NCAA) and Pacific-10 Conference competition. As a 19-year-old, she received the Honda Sports Award for Swimming and Diving, recognizing her as the outstanding college female swimmer of the year in 1985–86, was a runner-up for the award the following year and won again in 1988–89.

Johnson made Rivals.com's list for the "Top 100 Female Athletes In State History."

== See also ==
- List of Olympic medalists in swimming (women)
- List of Stanford University people
- List of World Aquatics Championships medalists in swimming (women)
