= Juan Pablo Valdivieso =

Peruvian swimmer

Personal information
- Full name: Juan Pablo Valdivieso
- National team: Peru
- Born: 27 February 1981 (age 45) Washington, D.C., U.S.
- Height: 1.90 m (6 ft 3 in)
- Weight: 75 kg (165 lb)

Sport
- Sport: Swimming
- Strokes: Butterfly
- Club: Nation's Capital Swim Club; Carderock Springs Swim Club
- College team: Princeton University (U.S.)
- Coach: Rick Curl (Peru Olympic Team); C. Rob Orr (Princeton)

Juan Pablo Valdivieso (born February 27, 1981) is an American-born Peruvian former butterfly swimmer, who swam for Princeton University and represented Peru in the 200-meter butterfly in the 2000 Sydney Olympics and the 100 and 200-meter butterfly in the 2004 Athens Olympics.

Valdivieso was born at Georgetown University Hospital in Washington, D.C. , on February 27, 1981, to Peruvian parents. He holds dual citizenship between his parents' nation, Peru, and the United States, where he was born and currently resides. He may have been influenced in his athletic pursuits by his grandfather , Juan Valdivieso, who played for Peru's soccer team at the 1936 Summer Olympics in Berlin. Valdivieso started swimming for the Carderock Swim Team, a summer swim team in the Montgomery County Swim League, at the age of five. During his teenage years, he tried out for the South American Junior Championships before competing at the U.S. senior nationals, and swam for the Nation's Capital Swim Club, the same club as Katie Ledecky.

In 1999, he graduated from Landon School in Bethesda, Maryland, maintaining an exceptional 4.0 grade average, and deferred his acceptance to Princeton University for a year, so that he could train for his first Olympics.

== Olympics ==
At 19, Valdivieso first represented the Peruvian Olympic team at the 2000 Summer Olympics in Sydney. Swimming in heat two of the men's 200 m butterfly, he edged out Thailand's Dulyarit Phuangthong to earn a fourth spot and thirty-sixth overall by 0.48 of a second in 2:03.67.

In preparation for the 2004 Olympics during his senior year at Princeton, Valdivieso trained with 2 30-minute swimming workout sessions, nine or 10 times every week, which took up a great deal of his time before the games. He averaged 7,000-9,000 meters or 4-6 miles per each 2 30-minute workout and also performed three 1-hour lifting sessions every week.

At the 2004 Summer Olympics in Athens, Valdivieso extended his program, competing in two individual events, the 100 and 200-meter butterfly. He trained with Rick Curl, the head coach of the Peruvian Olympic team, and achieved a FINA A-cut of 2:00.03 (200 m butterfly) from the USA National Championships in College Park, Maryland. In the 200 m butterfly, he challenged seven other swimmers in heat four, including top medal favorite Takashi Yamamoto of Japan. He rounded out the field to last place and twenty-eighth overall by 0.90 of a second behind Hungary's Dávid Kolozár in 2:02.79. In the 100 m butterfly, Valdivieso placed forty-seventh on the morning's preliminaries. Swimming in heat three, he saved a seventh spot over Algeria's Aghiles Slimani by 0.24 of a second with a time of 55.98.

Between his two Olympic stints, he attended Princeton University in New Jersey, where he majored in political economy and became a captain of the swimming team for the Princeton Tigers. At Princeton, he swam for Hall of Fame Coach C. Rob Orr.
