= 1987 Pan Pacific Swimming Championships =

Swimming championship

Coordinates: 27.513°S 153.147°E

- Host city: Brisbane, Australia
- Date: August 13–16, 1987
- Venue: Chandler Aquatic Centre

The second edition of the Pan Pacific Swimming Championships, a long course (50 m) event, was held in 1987 at the Chandler Aquatic Centre in Brisbane, Australia, from August 13–16.

== Results ==
=== Men's events ===
| Event | Gold | | Silver | | Bronze | |
|---|---|---|---|---|---|---|
| 50 m freestyle | Tom Jager (USA) | 22.32 WR | Matt Biondi (USA) | 22.61 | Andrew Baildon (AUS) | 23.45 |
| 100 m freestyle | Matt Biondi (USA) | 49.73 | Craig Oppel (USA) | 50.11 | Tom Stachewicz (AUS) | 50.84 |
| 200 m freestyle | Craig Oppel (USA) | 1:49.12 | Tom Stachewicz (AUS) | 1:49.61 | Marcel Gery (CAN) | 1:49.84 |
| 400 m freestyle | Matt Cetlinski (USA) | 3:49.51 | Sean Killion (USA) | 3:52.47 | Jason Plummer (AUS) | 3:53.50 |
| 1500 m freestyle | Michael Bruce McKenzie (AUS) | 15:08.08 | Dan Jorgensen (USA) | 15:12.09 | Jason Plummer (AUS) | 15:17.23 |
| 100 m backstroke | Mark Tewksbury (CAN) | 55.89 CWR | Daichi Suzuki (JPN) | 56.07 | Paul Kingsman (NZL) | 57.55 |
| 200 m backstroke | Dan Veatch (USA) | 2:01.38 | Mark Tewksbury (CAN) | 2:01.56 | Kevin Draxinger (CAN) | 2:03.54 |
| 100 m breaststroke | Victor Davis (CAN) | 1:02.85 | Richard Schroeder (USA) | 1:03.27 | Rodney Lawson (AUS) | 1:04.37 |
| 200 m breaststroke | Steve Bentley (USA) | 2:14.99 NR | Brett Beedle (USA) | 2:17.80 | Victor Davis (CAN) | 2:18.27 |
| 100 m butterfly | Pablo Morales (USA) | 53.37 | Jon Sieben (AUS) | 54.21 | Matt Biondi (USA) | 54.34 |
| 200 m butterfly | Melvin Stewart (USA) | 1:58.05 | Tom Ponting (CAN) | 1:58.99 | David Wilson (AUS) | 1:59.06 |
| 200 m individual medley | David Wharton (USA) | 2:02.49 | Alex Baumann (CAN) | 2:02.50 | Pablo Morales (USA) | 2:03.31 |
| 400 m individual medley | David Wharton (USA) | 4:16.12 WR | Rob Woodhouse (AUS) | 4:18.05 OC | Alex Baumann (CAN) | 4:18.46 |
| 4×100 m freestyle relay | United States; Chris Jacobs (50.49); Craig Oppel (50.14); Troy Dalbey (49.67); Matt Biondi (48.64) | 3:18.94 | Canada; Vlastimil Cerny (50.99); Sandy Goss (50.01); Blair Hicken (51.02); Marcel Gery (49.72) | 3:21.74 | Australia; Tom Stachewicz (50.85); Dominic Sheldrick (50.07); Martin Roberts (50.44); Duncan Armstrong (50.43) | 3:21.79 |
| 4×200 m freestyle relay | United States; Troy Dalbey (1:50.15); Matt Biondi (1:48.47); Matt Cetlinski (1:49.51); Craig Oppel (1:49.81) | 7:17.94 | Australia; Tom Stachewicz (1:49.94); Duncan Armstrong (1:48.45); Martin Roberts (1:50.33); Scott Hamlett (1:51.33) | 7:19.95 | Canada; Marcel Gery (1:50.61); Don Haddow (1:52.99); Paul Szekula (1:52.59); Turlough O'Hare (1:52.72) | 7:28.91 |
| 4×100 m medley relay | United States; Dan Veatch (58.08); Richard Schroeder (1:02.66); Pablo Morales (53.09); Matt Biondi (47.90) | 3:41.73 | Canada; Mark Tewksbury (56.33); Victor Davis (1:02.44); Tom Ponting (53.74); Marcel Gery (49.72) | 3:42.14 | Australia; Carl Wilson (57.97); Rodney Lawson (1:03.05); Jon Sieben (53.74); Tom Stachewicz (49.61) | 3:45.17 |

Legend: WR – World record; CR – Championship record; CWR – Commonwealth record; NR – National record

=== Women's events ===
| Event | Gold | | Silver | | Bronze | |
|---|---|---|---|---|---|---|
| 50 m freestyle | Anna Pettis-Scott (USA) | 26.16 | Lisa Dorman (USA) | 26.33 | Karen van Wirdum (AUS) | 26.44 |
| 100 m freestyle | Dara Torres (USA) | 55.86 | Jenna Johnson (USA) | 56.11 | Jane Kerr (CAN) | 57.13 |
| 200 m freestyle | Mitzi Kremer (USA) | 2:01.34 | Susie Baumer (AUS) | 2:01.74 | Francie O'Leary (USA) | 2:01.82 |
| 400 m freestyle | Janet Evans (USA) | 4:09.32 | Julie McDonald (AUS) | 4:10.18 | Susie Baumer (AUS) | 4:11.32 |
| 800 m freestyle | Julie McDonald (AUS) | 8:23.18 CWR | Janet Evans (USA) | 8:33.11 | Donna Procter (AUS) | 8:34.47 |
| 100 m backstroke | Nicole Livingstone (AUS) | 1:02.64 CWR | Kristen Linehan (USA) | 1:03.50 | Susan O'Brien (USA) | 1:04.00 |
| 200 m backstroke | Nicole Livingstone (AUS) | 2:11.84 CWR | Andrea Hayes (USA) | 2:13.12 | Beth Barr (USA) | 2:14.21 |
| 100 m breaststroke | Allison Higson (CAN) | 1:09.92 | Guylaine Cloutier (CAN) | 1:11.24 | Xiaomin Huang (CHN) | 1:11.29 |
| 200 m breaststroke | Amy Shaw (USA) | 2:29.58 NR | Xiaomin Huang (CHN) | 2:29.66 | Susan Johnson (USA) | 2:32.60 |
| 100 m butterfly | Hong Qian (CHN) | 1:00.39 | Angel Myers (USA) | 1:00.62 | Jenna Johnson (USA) | 1:00.90 |
| 200 m butterfly | Kelley Davies (USA) | 2:12.51 | Takayo Kitano (JPN) | 2:12.76 | Kiyomi Takahashi (JPN) | 2:12.98 |
| 200 m individual medley | Angel Myers (USA) | 2:17.52 | Allison Higson (CAN) | 2:18.39 | Jane Kerr (CAN) | 2:20.15 |
| 400 m individual medley | Janet Evans (USA) | 4:44.99 | Garland O'Keefe (USA) | 4:47.13 | Donna Procter (AUS) | 4:47.40 |
| 4×100 m freestyle relay | United States; Jenna Johnson (56.02); Grace Cornelius (55.76); Laura Walker (56.55); Dara Torres (55.57) | 3:43.90 | China; Y.Lou (57.88); F.Xia (56.96); Yong Zhuang (56.72); Hong Qian | 3:49.34 | Australia; Jackie Grant (57.65); Karen Van Wirdum (57.50); Julie Pugh (57.80); Angela Mullens (56.63) | 3:49.48 |
| 4×200 m freestyle relay | United States; Mitzi Kremer (2:01.01); Trina Radke (2:02.65); Nancy Marley (2:00.70); Francie O'Leary (2:02.18) | 8:06.54 | Australia; Julie McDonald (2:03.07); Pippa Downes (2.04.13); Sheridan Burge-Lopez (2:04.09); Susie Baumer (2:02.18) | 8:13.58 | Canada; J.Kerr (2:02.19); P.Noall (2:04.29); N.Lovrinic (2:05.93); A.Higson (2:04.41) | 8:16.82 |
| 4×100 m medley relay | United States; Kristin Linehan (1:03.66); Susan Johnson (1:10.50); Angel Myers (1:00.01); Dara Torres (55.33) | 4:09.50 | Canada; L.Melien (1:04.26); A.Higson (1:10.70); M.Cater (1:02.96); J.Kerr (55.98) | 4:13.90 | China; W.Yang (1:06.51); X.Huang (1:10.60); H.Qian (1:00.39); F.Xia (56.72) | 4:14.22 |

== Medal table ==
| Rank | Nation | Gold | Silver | Bronze | Total |
|---|---|---|---|---|---|
| 1 | United States (USA) | 24 | 13 | 7 | 44 |
| 2 | Australia (AUS) | 4 | 7 | 13 | 24 |
| 3 | Canada (CAN) | 3 | 8 | 8 | 19 |
| 4 | China (CHN) | 1 | 2 | 2 | 5 |
| 5 | Japan (JPN) | 0 | 2 | 1 | 3 |
| 6 | New Zealand (NZL) | 0 | 0 | 1 | 1 |
| Totals (6 entries) | | 32 | 32 | 32 | 96 |
