= Matt Biondi =

American swimmer (born 1965)

Personal information
- Full name: Matthew Nicholas Biondi
- Nicknames: Matt; The California Condor
- National team: United States
- Born: October 8, 1965 (age 60) Moraga, California, U.S.
- Height: 6 ft 7 in (201 cm)
- Weight: 209 lb (95 kg)

Sport
- Sport: Swimming
- Strokes: Freestyle, butterfly
- College team: University of California, Berkeley
- Coach: Nort Thornton
Medal record
Men's swimming
Representing United States
Event	1st	2nd	3rd
Olympic Games	8	2	1
World Championships (LC)	6	2	3
Pan Pacific Games	13	3	2
Summer Universiade	4	1	0
Total	31	8	6
Olympic Games
Gold medal – first place	1984 Los Angeles	4×100 m freestyle
Gold medal – first place	1988 Seoul	50 m freestyle
Gold medal – first place	1988 Seoul	100 m freestyle
Gold medal – first place	1988 Seoul	4×100 m freestyle
Gold medal – first place	1988 Seoul	4×200 m freestyle
Gold medal – first place	1988 Seoul	4×100 m medley
Gold medal – first place	1992 Barcelona	4×100 m freestyle
Gold medal – first place	1992 Barcelona	4×100 m medley
Silver medal – second place	1988 Seoul	100 m butterfly
Silver medal – second place	1992 Barcelona	50 m freestyle
Bronze medal – third place	1988 Seoul	200 m freestyle
World Championships (LC)
Gold medal – first place	1986 Madrid	100 m freestyle
Gold medal – first place	1986 Madrid	4×100 m freestyle
Gold medal – first place	1986 Madrid	4×100 m medley
Gold medal – first place	1991 Perth	100 m freestyle
Gold medal – first place	1991 Perth	4×100 m freestyle
Gold medal – first place	1991 Perth	4×100 m medley
Silver medal – second place	1986 Madrid	100 m butterfly
Silver medal – second place	1991 Perth	50 m freestyle
Bronze medal – third place	1986 Madrid	50 m freestyle
Bronze medal – third place	1986 Madrid	200 m freestyle
Bronze medal – third place	1986 Madrid	4×200 m freestyle
Pan Pacific Games
Gold medal – first place	1985 Tokyo	50 m freestyle
Gold medal – first place	1985 Tokyo	100 m freestyle
Gold medal – first place	1985 Tokyo	4×200 m freestyle
Gold medal – first place	1985 Tokyo	4×100 m medley
Gold medal – first place	1987 Brisbane	100 m freestyle
Gold medal – first place	1987 Brisbane	4×100 m freestyle
Gold medal – first place	1987 Brisbane	4×100 m medley
Gold medal – first place	1987 Brisbane	4×200 m freestyle
Gold medal – first place	1991 Brisbane	100 m freestyle
Gold medal – first place	1991 Brisbane	4×100 m freestyle
Gold medal – first place	1991 Brisbane	4×100 m medley
Gold medal – first place	1991 Brisbane	100 m butterfly
Silver medal – second place	1985 Tokyo	200 m freestyle
Silver medal – second place	1987 Brisbane	50 m freestyle
Silver medal – second place	1991 Brisbane	50 m freestyle
Bronze medal – third place	1985 Tokyo	100 m butterfly
Bronze medal – third place	1987 Brisbane	100 m butterfly
Summer Universiade
Gold medal – first place	1985 Kobe	100 m freestyle
Gold medal – first place	1985 Kobe	200 m freestyle
Gold medal – first place	1985 Kobe	4×100 m freestyle
Gold medal – first place	1985 Kobe	4×200 m freestyle
Silver medal – second place	1985 Kobe	100 m butterfly

Matthew Nicholas Biondi (born October 8, 1965) is an American former competitive swimmer and water polo player. As a swimmer, he is an eleven-time Olympic medalist, and former world record-holder in five events. Biondi competed in the Summer Olympic Games in 1984, 1988 and 1992, winning a total of eleven medals (eight gold, two silver and one bronze). During his career, he set three individual world records in the 50-meter freestyle and four in the 100-meter freestyle.

At the 1988 Olympic Games in Seoul, Biondi won five gold medals, setting world records in the 50-meter freestyle and three relay events.

Biondi is a member of the International Swimming Hall of Fame and the United States Olympic Hall of Fame.

== Early life and athletics ==
Biondi started his aquatics career as a swimmer and water polo player in his hometown of Moraga, California. As he moved into his teens, his incredible abilities as a sprint swimmer began to emerge. Though he did not start swimming year-round until he started at Campolindo High School, by his senior year in 1983 Biondi was the top prep sprinter in America with a national high school record of 20.40 seconds in the 50-yard freestyle.

== College and international career ==
=== 1983–84 freshman year ===
Biondi accepted a scholarship to attend the University of California, Berkeley, to swim under Head Coach Nort Thornton and play water polo for coach Pete Cutino, and enrolled in fall of 1983. In his first year, he played on Berkeley's NCAA championship water polo team, and made the consolation finals at the 1984 NCAA Swimming Championships, finishing in ninth place in the 50-yard freestyle and 7th place in both the 100 and 200-yard freestyle events (until 1985 only the top six swimmers advanced to the championship finals) along with a fourth-place finish as part of the 400-yard freestyle relay and a second place in the 800 free relay.

=== 1984 Olympics ===
In the summer of 1984, Biondi surprised the swimming community by qualifying for a spot on the United States 4×100-meter freestyle relay at the 1984 Los Angeles Olympics with his fourth-place finish in the 100-meter freestyle at the Olympic Trials held in Indianapolis. He also finished 18th in the preliminaries of the 200-meter freestyle, failing to advance to the finals. At the Los Angeles Olympics, Biondi swam the third leg of the relay, entering the water in second place just barely behind the team from Australia. Thanks to his 49.67 second split time, the U.S. had taken a four-tenths of a second lead by the time that Biondi turned over the race to anchor swimmer Rowdy Gaines. The U.S. won the gold medal in Olympic and World Record time.

=== Post-Olympics NCAA swimming and water polo ===
In 1985, fresh off of his 1984 Olympics success, Biondi won the 100 and 200-yard freestyle events at the NCAA Championships, setting NCAA and American Records in each event, and contributed relay legs on Cal's victorious 400 and 800-yard freestyle relays, with the 400 free relay team also setting NCAA and American records. He finished second to Tom Jager of UCLA in the 50-yard freestyle and was part of Cal's second place 400-yard medley relay team. Thanks in large part to Biondi's efforts, the Cal team finished fourth overall in the team standings.

The next season, 1986, Biondi swept the sprint freestyles, repeating his 1985 victories in the 100 and 200, and adding a win in the 50 with new NCAA and American records in the event. Cal once again finished first in the 400 and 800 free relays with Biondi anchoring both, but once again fell short in the 400 medley relay finishing third. By virtue of his three individual victories, Biondi tied with Stanford's Pablo Morales for high-point scorer in the meet in which Cal finished runner-up to Stanford for the team title.

In his final collegiate season, 1987, Biondi repeated as winner in the 50, 100, and 200-yard freestyle events, breaking his own NCAA and American records in all three. Having broken the 50 free record in both his preliminary heat and again in the final, he became the first swimmer to break four individual NCAA and American records in the same meet. Once again Cal repeated as champions in the 400 and 800 freestyle relays, yet again they finished third in the 400 medley relay, and for the second straight year Biondi shared the high-point individual title with Morales. The Bears finished fifth in the team standings. For his career, Biondi won eight individual NCAA titles and swam on six winning relays. He broke individual NCAA and American records seven times, and was named the NCAA Swimmer of the Year in 1985, 1986, and 1987.

In his other sport, Biondi was named to an All-American College Water Polo team four times: a third-team selection in 1983, 1985, and 1987, and a second-team selection in 1984. Biondi's Cal Water Polo teams won NCAA Championships in 1983, 1984, and 1987, and Biondi was voted the team's most valuable player in 1985.

=== International swimming, 1985–88 ===
Biondi set the first of his twelve individual swimming world records in 1985. He was the first man to swim the 100-meter freestyle faster than 49 seconds, and by 1988 he owned the ten fastest times swum in that event and held the world record for nearly nine years. He won a total 24 U.S. Championships in the 50, 100, and 200-meter freestyle events, as well as the 100 butterfly. In two World Championships (1986 and 1991), Biondi won 11 medals including six gold. During his career, he was a finalist for the James E. Sullivan Award, the UPI Sportsman of the Year, the U.S. Olympic Committee Sportsman of the Year, and selected twice as the Swimming World magazine Male Swimmer of the World, in 1986 and 1988.

At the National Championships on August 6, 1985, Biondi set the world record in the 100-meter freestyle twice in a single day, swimming a 49.24 in the prelims and a 48.95 in the finals. On the following day, he won the 200-meter freestyle with an American record time of 1:47.89.

Later that month at the 1985 Pan Pacific Swimming Championships in Tokyo, Biondi won the 50-meter and 100-meter freestyle, and finished second to teammates Mike Heath and Pablo Morales, respectively, in the 200-meter freestyle and 100-meter butterfly. He won three additional gold medals as a member of all three winning American relay teams. The 4×100-meter free relay team of Scott McCadam, Mike Heath, Paul Wallace, and Biondi set a world record of 3:17.08, and the 4×100-meter medley relay team of Rick Carey, John Moffet, Pablo Morales, and Biondi set a world record of 3:38.28.

Biondi improved his world record in the 100-meter freestyle to 48.74 in June 1986 at the World Championship Trials.

At the 1986 World Aquatics Championships in Madrid, Biondi won seven medals: three gold, one silver, and three bronze. He won gold in the 100-meter freestyle with a time of 48.94, breaking the 49-second barrier for the third time. Individually, he also won a silver medal in the 100-meter butterfly, and bronze medals in the 50-meter and 200-meter freestyle. He won two additional gold medals as a member of the 4×100-meter freestyle and 4×100-meter medley relays, and a third bronze medal as a member of the 4×200-meter freestyle relay.

Returning to the US National Team for the fourth consecutive year, Biondi won four gold medals at the 1987 Pan Pacific Swimming Championships in Brisbane, Australia, in the 100-meter freestyle and as a member of all three winning American relay teams. In addition, he won silver in the 50-meter freestyle and bronze in the 100-meter butterfly.

At the 1988 Olympic Trials, Biondi qualified to compete in seven events: the three relays, and individually in the 50-, 100-, and 200-meter freestyle and the 100-meter butterfly. He set the world record in the 100-meter freestyle for the fourth time (48.42), and broke his own American record in the 200-meter freestyle (1:47.72).

=== 1988 Olympics ===
Biondi won five gold, one silver, and one bronze medal at the 1988 Seoul Olympics, setting four world records and an Olympic record.

In his first event, the 200-meter freestyle, Biondi faced reigning Olympic Champion, World Champion, and world record-holder Michael Gross. Biondi swam a good race, with a time of 1:47.99, but finished with a bronze medal behind Australian Duncan Armstrong, who won gold with a new world record, and Anders Holmertz of Sweden, who earned the silver.

Biondi's finished second in his next event, the 100-meter butterfly, by the narrowest possible margin. In the finals, he was caught between strokes as he approached the finishing wall. He chose to glide rather than take another stroke, and was edged out by Anthony Nesty of Suriname by just one one-hundredth (0.01) of a second. Biondi's silver medal time of 53.01 was a personal best.

Later that day, Biondi anchored the 4×200-meter freestyle relay, joined by teammates Troy Dalbey, Matt Cetlinski, and Doug Gjertsen. The American team won gold, setting a world record of 7:12.51. Biondi entered the water with the U.S. team in second place .82 seconds behind the East German team, but passed them by swimming the fastest split time of the race with a 1:46.44, which at the time was also the fastest ever 200 freestyle relay split. This started Biondi's remarkable streak of five gold medals in five days of Olympic swimming, each a world or Olympic record.

In the 100-meter freestyle, Biondi won his first individual Olympic gold, setting a new Olympic record of 48.63. This was the second-fastest 100-meter freestyle of all time, eclipsed only by Biondi's effort at the Olympic trials the prior month. Teammate Chris Jacobs won silver, delivering the first one-two finish for the American swim team at the 1988 Olympics.

Next up was the 4×100-meter freestyle relay, in which Biondi was joined by teammates Jacobs, Troy Dalbey, and Tom Jager. The American team won gold with another world record, 3:16.53, anchored by Biondi's blistering split of 47.81.

In his fourth individual event, Biondi faced Jager in the 50-meter freestyle. It was the Olympic debut of the event, in which both Biondi and Jager had previously set world records. It was another one-two finish for the Americans, with Biondi winning gold in a world-record time of 22.14, and Jager winning silver.

The Olympic swimming competition concluded with the 4×100-meter medley relay. Biondi swam the butterfly leg, joined by teammates David Berkoff (backstroke), Richard Schroeder (breaststroke), and Chris Jacobs (freestyle). The American men set another world record of 3:36.93 to complete their gold-medal sweep in the relays.

For his accomplishments in 1988, Biondi was named the United Press International Athlete of the Year, the US Olympic Committee Athlete of the Year, and the Swimming World Swimmer of the Year.

=== 1992 Olympics ===
At the 1992 Olympics in Barcelona, Biondi won two more gold medals in relays and a silver in the 50-meter freestyle. Following the 1992 Olympics, Biondi retired, which he attributed to multiple factors including lack of financial assistance.

=== World Championships ===
Biondi competed at the World Championships in 1986 and 1991, winning six gold medals.

In 1986, he won three gold medals, one silver and three bronzes to set a record of seven medals at one World Championship meet. This record has since been matched by Michael Phelps, and passed by Caeleb Dressel with eight medals.

== Personal life ==
Biondi graduated from the University of California, Berkeley, in 1988 with a Bachelor of Arts degree in Political Economy of Industrialized Societies (PEIS).

Biondi married Kirsten Metzger in her home state of Hawaii in 1995. They have three children: Nathaniel (Nate), born in 1998, who swam for the UC Berkeley men's swimming program from 2018–2021; Lucas, born in 2002; and Makena, born in 2007. They divorced in 2014. Kirsten still resides in Hawaii.

Kirsten Biondi persuaded her husband to continue his education, and he earned his master's degree in education in 2000 at Lewis and Clark College in Portland, Oregon.

In recent years, Biondi has worked as a school teacher and swimming coach in Hawaii. As of 2012, he teaches math and coaches at Sierra Canyon School in the Los Angeles neighborhood of Chatsworth.

Biondi has become active within the masters swimming community, launching an annual masters competition that bears his name. The Matt Biondi Masters Classic was held for the first time on March 23, 2014, in Simi Valley, California. The competition is a one-day, short course yards meet held in conjunction with Biondi's masters club, the Conejo Valley Multisport Masters. Matt Biondi is NOT related to famous Italian jazz, disco, funk and soul singer Mario Biondi.

== See also ==
- Bay Area Sports Hall of Fame
- List of multiple Olympic gold medalists
- List of multiple Olympic gold medalists at a single Games
- List of multiple Olympic medalists at a single Games
- List of multiple Olympic gold medalists in one event
- List of multiple Summer Olympic medalists
- List of Olympic medalists in swimming (men)
- List of University of California, Berkeley alumni
- List of World Aquatics Championships medalists in swimming (men)
- World record progression 50 metres freestyle
- World record progression 100 metres freestyle
- World record progression 4 × 100 metres freestyle relay
- World record progression 4 × 100 metres medley relay
- World record progression 4 × 200 metres freestyle relay

Records
Preceded by Tom Jager; Tom Jager	Men's 50-meter freestyle world record-holder (long course); June 26, 1986 – August 13, 1987; September 24, 1988 – August 20, 1989	Succeeded by Tom Jager; Tom Jager
Preceded by Rowdy Gaines	Men's 100-meter freestyle world record-holder (long course); August 6, 1985 – June 18, 1994	Succeeded by Alexander Popov
Awards and achievements
Preceded by Michael Gross; Tamás Darnyi	Swimming World; World Swimmer of the Year; 1986; 1988	Succeeded by Tamás Darnyi; Mike Barrowman
Preceded by Ben Johnson	United Press International; Athlete of the Year; 1988	Succeeded by Boris Becker
Olympic Games
Preceded by Carl Osburn	Most career Olympic medals by an American; 1988–2004	Succeeded by Jenny Thompson
Preceded by Mark Spitz	Most career Olympic medals by an American; 1988–2004	Succeeded by Jenny Thompson
Preceded by Carl Osburn	Most career Olympic medals by an American man 1988–2008	Succeeded by Michael Phelps
Preceded by Mark Spitz	Most career Olympic medals by an American man 1988–2008	Succeeded by Michael Phelps
