= 2000 United States Olympic trials (swimming) =

2000 United States Olympic Trials (swimming)
- Host city: Indianapolis, Indiana, U.S.
- Date: August 9 – August 16
- Venue: Indiana University Natatorium
- Events: 26 (men: 13; women: 13)

The 2000 United States Olympic trials for swimming events were held from August 9 to 16 in Indianapolis, Indiana. It was the qualifying meet for American swimmers who hoped to compete at the 2000 Summer Olympics in Sydney.

== Results ==
Key: Highlighted swimmers achieved the qualification conditions to be included in the Olympic team in that respective event.

=== Men's events ===
Event	Gold		Silver		Bronze	
50 m freestyle	Gary Hall, Jr.	21.76 NR	Anthony Ervin	21.80	Neil Walker	22.12
100 m freestyle	Neil Walker	48.71	Gary Hall, Jr.	48.84	Scott Tucker	48.95
200 m freestyle	Josh Davis	1:47.26 NR	Scott Goldblatt	1:48.12	Chad Carvin	1:48.17
400 m freestyle	Klete Keller	3:47.18 NR	Chad Carvin	3:47.50	Robert Margalis	3:50.68
1500 m freestyle	Erik Vendt	14:59.11 NR	Chris Thompson	15:09.16	Robert Margalis	15:13.59
100 m backstroke	Lenny Krayzelburg	53.84	Neil Walker	54.85	Randall Bal	55.09
200 m backstroke	Lenny Krayzelburg	1:57.31	Aaron Peirsol	1:57.98	Brian Walters	1:59.58
100 m breaststroke	Ed Moses	1:00.44 NR	Pat Calhoun	1:01.09	Brendan Hansen	1:01.74
200 m breaststroke	Kyle Salyards	2:13.21	Tom Wilkens	2:13.34	Brendan Hansen	2:13.49
100 m butterfly	Ian Crocker	52.78	Tommy Hannan	52.81	Dod Wales	53.41
200 m butterfly	Tom Malchow	1:56.87	Michael Phelps	1:57.48	Jeff Somensatto	1:58.07
200 m IM	Tom Dolan	2:00.81	Tom Wilkens	2:01.38	Kevin Clements	2:02.55
400 m IM	Tom Dolan	4:13.72	Erik Vendt	4:13.89	Tom Wilkens	4:15.69

=== Women's events ===
Event	Gold		Silver		Bronze	
50 m freestyle	Dara Torres	24.90	Amy Van Dyken	24.99	Haley Cope	25.40
100 m freestyle	Jenny Thompson	54.07 NR	Dara Torres	54.62	Ashley Tappin	55.28
200 m freestyle	Lindsay Benko	2:00.45	Rada Owen	2:00.54	Samantha Arsenault	2:00.79
400 m freestyle	Diana Munz	4:08.71	Brooke Bennett	4:08.76	Kaitlin Sandeno	4:12.40
800 m freestyle	Brooke Bennett	8:23.92	Kaitlin Sandeno	8:28.61	Diana Munz	8:28.66
100 m backstroke	Barbara Bedford	1:01.85	Courtney Shealy	1:02.05	Lea Maurer	1:02.25
200 m backstroke	Amanda Adkins	2:12.97	Lindsay Benko	2:13.19	Shelly Ripple	2:14.25
100 m breaststroke	Megan Jendrick	1:07.26	Staciana Stitts	1:07.79	Kristy Kowal	1:07.80
200 m breaststroke	Kristy Kowal	2:24.75 NR	Amanda Beard	2:26.79	Megan Jendrick	2:27.60
100 m butterfly	Jenny Thompson	57.78	Dara Torres	57.86	Ashley Tappin	58.98
200 m butterfly	Misty Hyman	2:09.27	Kaitlin Sandeno	2:09.54	Emily Mason	2:11.96
200 m IM	Cristina Teuscher	2:13.36	Gabrielle Rose	2:14.95	Martha Bowen	2:15.10
400 m IM	Kaitlin Sandeno	4:40.91	Maddy Crippen	4:42.81	Cristina Teuscher	4:44.42

== See also ==
- United States at the 2000 Summer Olympics
- United States Olympic Trials (swimming)
- USA Swimming
