= Dan Veatch =

American Olympic swimmer (born 1965)

Personal information
- Full name: Daniel Hayward Veatch
- Nickname: "Dan"
- National team: United States
- Born: April 18, 1965 (age 61) Potomac, Maryland, U.S.
- Height: 6 ft 1 in (1.85 m)
- Weight: 173 lb (78 kg)

Sport
- Sport: Swimming
- Strokes: Backstroke, medley
- College team: Princeton University
- Coach: C. Rob Orr (Princeton)
Medal record
Men's swimming
Representing the United States
World Championships (LC)
Gold medal – first place	1986 Madrid	4x100 m medley
Pan Pacific Games
Gold medal – first place	1987 Brisbane	200 m backstroke
Gold medal – first place	1987 Brisbane	4x100 m medley
Gold medal – first place	1989 Tokyo	200 m backstroke
Pan American Games
Silver medal – second place	1991 Havana	200 m backstroke

Daniel Hayward Veatch (born April 18, 1965) is an American former competition swimmer who represented the United States at the 1988 Olympics in Seoul, South Korea.

Veatch attended Princeton University where he swam for Hall of Fame Coach C. Rob Orr, graduating around 1986.

== Olympics ==
Veatch competed in his signature event, the men's 200-meter backstroke at the 1988 Seoul Olympics, finishing seventh in the event final. He won the 200-meter backstroke at the Pan Pacific Games in Brisbane in 1987 and again in Tokyo in 1989. He pulled his hamstring at the U.S. Trials for the 1992 Summer Olympics just minutes before the 200-meter backstroke event and so was unable to qualify for those Games.

He is openly gay, and lives in San Francisco. At age 30, in January 1994, Veatch became the first masters swimmer to reach 6000 yards in one hour. In 2000, he swam for the University of San Francisco Masters, and credited Coach Valeriy Boreyko with helping him to retain his skills and stay motivated in training.

== See also ==
- List of World Aquatics Championships medalists in swimming (men)
- List of Princeton University Olympians
- List of Princeton University people
