= Andrea Hayes =

American swimmer (born 1969)

Personal information
- Full name: Andrea Jean Hayes
- National team: United States
- Born: January 12, 1969 (age 57)
- Height: 6 ft 0 in (1.83 m)
- Weight: 141 lb (64 kg)

Sport
- Sport: Swimming
- Strokes: Backstroke, individual medley
- Club: Greater Pensacola Aquatic Club
- College team: University of Texas
- Coach: Steve Bultman (Greater Pensacola AC)
Medal record
Women's swimming
Representing the United States
Pan Pacific Championships
Gold medal – first place	1985 Tokyo	200 m backstroke
Silver medal – second place	1985 Tokyo	100 m backstroke
Silver medal – second place	1987 Brisbane	200 m backstroke

Andrea Jean Hayes (born January 12, 1969), later known by her married name Andrea Dickson, is an American former competition swimmer who swam for the University of Texas, and represented the United States at the 1988 Summer Olympics in Seoul, South Korea.

Hayes attended Booker T. Washington High School, graduating in 1986, and swam for the Greater Pensacola Aquatic Club under Hall of Fame Coach Steve Bultman along with fellow Seoul 1988 swimming Olympians Beth Barr and Daniel Watters. Washington High School, completed around 1981, had an outstanding sports program, and an indoor pool when Hayes was a student. She won the 200 Individual Medley at the Class 4A Florida State Swim Championships in Orlando on November 23, 1985, with a state record time of 2:04.76, and also won the 100 backstroke with a time of 57.05. Hayes was a National Champion in both the 100 and 200 breaststroke, and swam with the U.S. National Team.

== University of Texas swimming ==
As a competitor at the University of Texas she helped capture three NCAA team titles, and was an All-American swimmer 16 times. Hayes immediately contributed to Texas, helping it win its fourth sequential NCAA championship in 1986–87, her Freshman year. She earned All-America honors in all three individual events at the NCAA Championships in 1987, with a second place in the 200 backstroke, a fourth-place finish in the 500 freestyle, and a seventh-place finish in the 400 IM. She helped Texas capture SEC conference titles in the 400 medley relay and the 800 freestyle relay in 1987 as well.

In her sophomore year, at the 1988 NCAA championship, she contributed greatly to help Texas advance to their fifth straight NCAA title. That year she helped UT finish second in the 800 freestyle relay, while she placed third in the 500 freestyle, the 400 IM and the 200 backstroke.

As a Junior at the 1989 NCAA championships, Hayes placed second in the 1,650 freestyle, third in the 500 freestyle and ninth in the 400 IM. As a Senior at the 1990 NCAA Championships, Hayes helped lead Texas to its sixth NCAA team title in seven seasons, capturing four more All-America honors, with a second in the 1,650 freestyle, a fourth in the 500 freestyle and a sixth place in the 200 backstroke. As a Senior, she was coached at UT by Hall of Fame Texas women's Coach Mark Schubert. As of 2023 Hayes still held a top ten University team time in the 500 and 1,650 freestyle. In her Senior year in 1990, she served as the University of Texas women's swim team captain.

She is best known for winning a gold medal in the 200-meter backstroke at the inaugural 1985 Pan Pacific Swimming Championships in Tokyo, Japan.

== 1988 Olympics ==
Hayes qualified for the 1988 Olympic trials as a Junior at the University of Texas. At the mid-August trials in Austin, Texas, she failed to finish in second place in three of the four events in which she had qualified, the 400 IM, and the 400 and 800 freestyles, though she came close. On the last day of the trials, in a close race Hayes placed second in the 200 back, her best event, and qualified for the Seoul Olympics behind her fellow Greater Pensacola Aquatics teammate Beth Barr, and just edging out the third-place finisher.

At the 1988 Olympics, she finished sixth in the final of the women's 200-meter backstroke event, with a time of 2:15.02.

Three years after the 1988 Seoul Olympics, in 1991, 20 East German coaches admitted the East German women's Olympic swimming team had been systematically using anabolic steroids in their training. One Hungarian and two East German women swimmers finished ahead of Hayes in the 200-meter backstroke with Kristina Egerzegi of Hungary finishing first, and then East German swimmers Kathryn Zimmerman, and Cornelia Sirch taking second and third. The American swimming community has speculated that Hayes might have completed the 200 with a bronze medal or in much closer medal contention if the East German women swimmers had been stripped of their medals.

Hayes later became the co-chair of Swim Across America Dallas, a partner of Swim Across America, a charitable fundraising organization for cancer that largely raises funds through the efforts of individuals and teams that gain sponsorship through organized swims. She likely worked as co-chair when she was living in Dallas around 2010–2011, and was involved in a number of charities in the Dallas area.

== Honors ==
In 2016 Hayes was inducted into the Longhorn Women's Hall of Honor.

== See also ==
- List of University of Texas at Austin alumni
