= Mike Barrowman =

American swimmer (born 1968)

Personal information
- Full name: Michael Ray Barrowman
- Nickname: "Mike"
- National team: United States
- Born: December 4, 1968 (age 57) Asunción, Paraguay
- Height: 5 ft 11 in (1.80 m)
- Weight: 165 lb (75 kg)

Sport
- Sport: Swimming
- Strokes: Breaststroke
- Club: Rockville-Montgomery Swim Club; Nation's Capital Swim Club
- College team: University of Michigan
- Coach: Jozsef Nagy (Curl-Burke/NCAP); Jon Urbanchek (U. Michigan)
Medal record
Men's swimming
Representing the United States
Olympic Games
Gold medal – first place	1992 Barcelona	200 m breaststroke
World Championships (LC)
Gold medal – first place	1991 Perth	200 m breaststroke
Pan Pacific Championships
Gold medal – first place	1989 Tokyo	200 m breaststroke
Gold medal – first place	1991 Edmonton	100 m breaststroke
Gold medal – first place	1991 Edmonton	200 m breaststroke
Gold medal – first place	1991 Edmonton	4x100 m medley
Pan American Games
Silver medal – second place	1987 Indianapolis	200 m breaststroke

Michael Ray Barrowman (born December 4, 1968) is an American former competition swimmer, Olympic champion, and former world record-holder. Barrowman was one of the pioneers of the "wave-style" breaststroke technique. Prior to attending University of Michigan, he trained with Montgomery Square Copenhaver Swim Club, Rockville-Montgomery Swim Club in Maryland, and the Nation's Capital Swim Club.

Barrowman was born December 4, 1968 in Asunción, Paraguay. Mike's father was an army cartographer, requiring the family to relocate often. Barrowman began swimming by the age of five and lived in Rhode Island through the age of 11, where he swam for the Cumberland Lincoln Boys Club, setting several New England and Rhode Island State age-group records. By 13, around 1981, Barrowman moved and lived in the Washington metropolitan area in Potomac, Maryland. He attended Potomac's Winston Churchill High School, where he swam for the school team and the Rockville-Montgomery Swim Club through most of his High School years.

In 1986, Barrowman began swimming with the Curl-Burke Swim Club (Now officially the Nation's Capital Swim Club), where he was coached by one of his most influential mentors, Hungarian-born Hall of Fame Coach Jozsef Nagy, who helped Barrowman focus on breaststroke. Nagy first introduced the "wave-action" breaststroke technique and had competed internationally for his native Hungary in the stroke. Barrowman eventually trained with Nagy's Curl-Burke Swim Club in Washington D.C., around 20 miles Southeast of Potomoc, Maryland, though they currently also have training facilities in Maryland.

== University of Michigan ==
Beginning in the Fall of 1988, Barrowman attended the University of Michigan, and swam for the Michigan Wolverines swimming and diving team in National Collegiate Athletic Association (NCAA) and Big Ten Conference competition under Hall of Fame Coach and former University of Michigan swimmer Jon Urbanchek. Urbanchek held the NCAA championship in the one-mile freestyle while at Michigan. He was named the Big 10 Athlete of the Year (all sports) in 1991. Between 1989 and 1991, he won three consecutive NCAA national championships in the 200-yard breaststroke, and was named NCAA Swimmer of the Year in 1990. His NCAA record of 1:53.77 from 1990, would stand strong for eleven years, and was the oldest men's NCAA record in 2001, when it was broken by Brendan Hansen. Barrowman broke the world record in the 200-meter breaststroke six times, and held the world's record for over thirteen years; both achievements are world records in themselves.

== 1988-92 Olympics ==
At the August, 1988 U.S. Olympic Swim Trials in Austin, Texas, Barrowman had to cut seven and one-half seconds from his 200-meter breaststroke, from a time of 2:21.39 to an American record time of 2:13.74, to place first in the event in the trial finals and make the 1988 US Olympic Team and compete in Seoul.

Barrowman placed what he considered a somewhat disappointing fourth in the 1988 Summer Olympics in Seoul, Korea, in the 200-meter breaststroke with a time of 2:15.45. Barrowman had swum in third place before being dropped to fourth. Barrowman's former coach Joszef Nagy was also coaching Hungarian swimmer Jozsef Szabo who took the gold medal with a time of 2:13.52. Nick Gillingham of Great Britain took the silver with a time of 2:15.21.

At the late July, 1992 Summer Olympics in Barcelona, after intensive training he captured the gold medal in the 200-meter breaststroke event in the world record time of 2:10.16, as the clear favorite to win the gold. Norbert Rozsa of Hungary placed second with a 2:11.23, and Nick Gillingham of Great Britain took third with a time of 2:11.29.

=== World records, championships ===
Barrowman set a world record in the 200-meter breaststroke in 1989 at the USA Swimming Long Course National Championships with a time of 2:12.90. The following year at the 1990 Goodwill Games he recorded a time of 2:11.53 and beat two other swimmers who also bested the previous world mark. In 1991, he was named Champion of the World in the World Championships in Perth, Australia, winning the 200-meter breaststroke in world record time.

In all, Barrowman won six U.S. National Championships, with two in the 200-yard breaststroke short course, and four in the 200-meter breaststroke long course. He won a gold in the 1989 Pan Pacifics in the 200 m breaststroke in Tokyo. He later won a gold in the 100-meter breaststroke, 200-meter breaststroke, and 4x100-meter Medley Relay at the 1991 Pan Pacific Championships in Edmonton.

=== Career pursuits ===
Barrowman retired from swimming and took up competitive flatwater kayaking, competing at the U.S. Olympic Festival in 1995. He has served as a banker, and part-time masters swim coach in the Cayman Islands where has lived at least through 2016. Barrowman had previously owned a film studio which created an award-winning underwater television program for children, "Under the Waves".

=== Honors ===
He was named World Swimmer of the Year in 1989 and 1990 by Swimming World Magazine, and was inducted into the International Swimming Hall of Fame in 1997. He was also made a member of the University of Michigan Sports Hall of Fame and the Rhode Island Aquatics Hall of Fame.

Dominating breaststroke during his career, he was selected as a finalist for the AAU Sullivan Award in 1990, 1991 and 1993.

== See also ==
- List of members of the International Swimming Hall of Fame
- List of Olympic medalists in swimming (men)
- List of University of Michigan alumni
- List of World Aquatics Championships medalists in swimming (men)
- World record progression 200 metres breaststroke

Records
Preceded by Victor Davis	Men's 200-meter breaststroke world record-holder (long course); August 4, 1989 – October 2, 2002 (tied Nick Gillingham on August 19, 1989)	Succeeded by Kosuke Kitajima
Awards
Preceded by Matt Biondi	Swimming World; World Swimmer of the Year; 1989–1990	Succeeded by Tamás Darnyi
