= Daniel Watters =

American swimmer (born 1971)

Personal information
- Full name: Daniel Linton Watters
- National team: United States
- Born: March 18, 1971 (age 55)
- Height: 5 ft 10 in (1.78 m)
- Weight: 161 lb (73 kg)

Sport
- Sport: Swimming
- Strokes: Breaststroke
- Club: Greater Pensacola Aquatics (GPAC)
- College team: University of Texas
- Coach: Steve Bultman (GPAC); Eddie Reese (U. Texas)

Daniel Linton Watters (born March 18, 1971) is an American former competition swimmer for the University of Texas who participated in the 1988 Summer Olympics in the men's 100-meter breaststroke in Seoul, South Korea. After obtaining an MBA from the University of San Francisco, Watters worked as a business manager for several companies generally focusing in the field of information technology.

Hall graduated from Pensacola's Booker T. Washington High School where he was coached by Mike Haas. Watters also competed and likely trained more intensely during his High School years with the Greater Pensacola Aquatic Club (GPAC) under Hall of Fame Coach Steve Bultman along with fellow Pensacolans and 1988 Olympians Beth Barr, and Andrea Hayes. At only 15 on August 13, 1986, while competing in his first National meet, Watters placed first in the 200-meter breaststroke with a time of 2:25.02 at the McDonalds-U.S. Swimming Junior Olympics in Fort Lauderdale, Florida.

Swimming around his Sophomore year for Booker T. Washington, at the Class 4A Florida State Swimming Championships on November 23, 1986, in Orlando, Watters took the state title in the 100 breaststroke, his signature event, with a 58.22, helping Booker T. Washington take the Florida State Championship that year. At the NSPI Invite, in mid-October 1987, Waters won the 100-meter breast stroke with a record time of 59.93, breaking the 1986 record by 2/10 of a second. He also swam anchor at the NSPI meet on a winning 400 freestyle relay.

== 1988 Olympics ==
As a 17-year about to begin his High School Senior at Pensacola's Booker T. Washington, Watters qualified for the 1988 Seoul Olympics at the U.S. Trials in Austin, Texas on August 8 by placing second in the 100-meter breaststroke in a personal best time of 1:02.76, edging out the third place finisher by around half a second.

Watters competed in the B Final of the men's 100-meter breaststroke, and finished with the fifteenth-best time overall with a time of 1:04.17. In the highly competitive Olympic field, his time was within 2 seconds of the bronze medalist from Russia. No members of the U.S. team medaled in the event that year. Steve Bultman, Watters' coach at Greater Pensacola Aquatic Club, served as an Assistant Coach at the Olympics that year.

== University of Texas ==
He attended the University of Texas from around 1989-1993, where he swam under Men's Hall of Fame Head Coach, Eddie Reese. As an accomplished breaststroker, Watters helped capture two NCAA titles for Texas and in his senior year captained the team. After graduating in 1993, he attended the University of San Francisco, where he received an MBA.

He pursued employment in various business fields, working in information technology (IT) for a number of companies. He started with KPMG, but was then with Capgemini in Dallas, AT Kearney as a senior manager in IT, and Amdocs in business development and sales. Around 2011, he was responsible for managing the American division of an Israeli-owned telecommunications company in Dallas. In the 2010s, he worked for Oberthur Technologies, a French Digital Security company. Since 2009, he has worked with Swim Across America since first swimming the event in San Francisco. In 2011 he helped bring Swim Across America to Dallas and has served as Swim Across America's Dallas Committee's Co-Director. Swim Across America is a nation-wide charitable organization that funds cancer research, largely through the efforts of individuals and teams that gain sponsors to perform an organized swim selected, planned, and staffed by the local Swim Across America organization.

== See also ==
- List of University of Texas at Austin alumni
