= United States Olympic trials (swimming) =

The United States Olympic team swim trials are held before every Summer Olympic Games to select the US Olympic swimming team participants. The event is overseen by the United States Olympic Committee and run by USA Swimming.

The first Olympic trials were held in 1920 in Alameda, California, to select swimmers for the 1920 Summer Olympics in Antwerp, Belgium. The men's and women's trials have been held separately six times.

== Venues ==
Year	Location	Venue(s)	Dates	Notes
1920	Alameda, California (Western); Manhattan Beach, New York (women's final); Chicago, Illinois (men's final)		western: June 26–27 final (women): July 10 final (men): July 10–11	
1924	Indianapolis, Indiana (men's); Briarcliff Manor, New York (women's)	Broad Ripple Park Pool (men's); Briarcliff Lodge (women's)	men: June 5–7 women: June 7–8	
1928	Iowa City, Iowa (Midwestern tryouts); Philadelphia, Pennsylvania (NCAA tryouts); Detroit, Michigan (men's Final tryouts); Rockaway Playland Pool (women's Final tryouts)		Midwest: February 10–11; NCAA: March 30–31	
1932	Cincinnati, Ohio (men's); Long Island, New York (women's)		men: July 13–16 women: July 15–16	
1936	Providence, Rhode Island (men's); Astoria, New York (women's)		men: July 10–12 women: July 11–12	
1948	Detroit, Michigan		July 8–11	
1952	Astoria Park, Astoria, New York (men's); Indianapolis, Indiana (women's)	Flushing Meadow Amphitheatre (men's); Broad Ripple Park Pool (women's)	July 4–6	
1956	Detroit, Michigan		August 7–10	
1960	Detroit, Michigan		August 2–5	
1964	Astoria, New York		August 29–September 3	
1968	Long Beach, California (men's); Los Angeles, California (women's)		men: August 30–September 3 women: August 24–28	
1972	Chicago, Illinois	Portage Park	August 2–6	
1976	Long Beach, California		June 16–21	
1980	Irvine, California		July 29–August 2	Olympic trials canceled due to the 1980 Summer Olympics boycott Event rescheduled for after the actual Olympic competition
1984	Indianapolis, Indiana	Indiana University Natatorium	June 25–30	
1988	Austin, Texas		August 8–13	
1992	Indianapolis, Indiana	Indiana University Natatorium	March 1–7	US Spring Nationals
1996	Indianapolis, Indiana	Indiana University Natatorium	March 6–12	
2000	Indianapolis, Indiana	Indiana University Natatorium	August 9–16	
2004	Long Beach, California		July 7–14	
2008	Omaha, Nebraska	Qwest Center Omaha	June 29–July 6	winners considered national champions
2012	Omaha, Nebraska	CenturyLink Center Omaha	June 25–July 2	
2016	Omaha, Nebraska	CenturyLink Center Omaha	June 26–July 3	
2020	Omaha, Nebraska	CHI Health Center Omaha	June 13–20, 2021	Rescheduled from June 21–28, 2020; Postponed due to the COVID-19 pandemic
2024	Indianapolis, Indiana	Lucas Oil Stadium	June 15–23	
2028	Indianapolis, Indiana	Lucas Oil Stadium	June	

== See also ==
- Swimming at the Summer Olympics
