= Craig Oppel =

American swimmer

Personal information
- Full name: Richard Craig Oppel
- National team: United States
- Born: September 26, 1966 (age 59) Keflavik, Iceland
- Height: 6 ft 3 in (1.91 m)
- Weight: 190 lb (86 kg)
- Spouse: Natalie Jean Neill

Sport
- Sport: Swimming
- Strokes: Freestyle
- Club: Des Moines Aquatic Club
- College team: University of California, Los Angeles
- Coach: Mike Burton (Des Moines Aquatic Club); Mark Wagner (W. Des Moines Valley High); Ron Ballatore, (UCLA); Richard Quick (1988 Olympics)
Medal record
Men's swimming
Representing the United States
Olympic Games
Gold medal – first place	1988 Seoul	4x200 m freestyle
Pan Pacific Games
Gold medal – first place	1985 Tokyo	4x200 m freestyle
Gold medal – first place	1987 Brisbane	200 m freestyle
Gold medal – first place	1987 Brisbane	4x100 m freestyle
Gold medal – first place	1987 Brisbane	4x200 m freestyle
Silver medal – second place	1987 Brisbane	100 m freestyle
Summer Universiade
Gold medal – first place	1985 Kobe	4x100 m freestyle
Gold medal – first place	1985 Kobe	4x200 m freestyle

Richard Craig Oppel (born August 10, 1967) is an American former competition swimmer who represented the United States at the 1988 Summer Olympics in Seoul, South Korea, winning a gold medal in the 4x200 freestyle relay. After graduating the University of California at Los Angeles in 1989 where he competed in swimming, he completed a JD Degree at Drake University in 1995 in Des Moines and practiced law in Muscatine, Iowa.

== Early life and swimming ==
Oppel was born August 10, 1967, the youngest of four children, in Kelflavik, Iceland to Colonel Arthur Franklin Oppel and wife Sally June Snider Oppel. Craig's father Albert was an All American High School football star for Dallas' Highland Park High School, attended West Point and served in the U.S. Air Force as a fighter pilot. With a focus on education, his father taught at the Air Force Academy, the University of Iowa, and the University of Arkansas.

Like his father, Craig would successfully focus on both athletics and education in his early life. He began to swim at age six, and while competing for Ram Swim Club of Ralston, outside Omaha, Nebraska in March, 1976, he set an age group record in the 50-yard freestyle for eight-year-olds. During his early years, he also represented the Omaha Westside Swim Club. Swimming at age 12 for the West Des Moines Dolphins in August, 1980, he set three Iowa age group records, and one state-wide record to qualify for the Regional AAU age-group meet.

== High school era swimming ==
As a 13 and 14-year old age group swimmer, he competed for the Des Moines Aquatic Club where he trained under Olympic triple gold medalist Mike Burton and won the 1500-meter event for his age group. Coach Burton had specialized in freestyle distance swimming, and his Des Moines Club had a demanding training program, that included interval speed training. Oppel later credited Burton's advice and demanding training for much of his later success. Swimming for West Des Moines Valley High School as a Freshman at the Metropolitan Conference Swimming Championships in 1982, he won the 200 and 500-yard freestyle events, and was the first swimmer on the 4x100 yard freestyle relay which set a meet record of 3:19.20. Oppel helped lead West Des Moines to their third successive title in the Metro conference. At Valley High, he competed and trained under Coach Mark Wagner. Primarily a short to middle-distance freestyle competitor in individual competition as a High School swimmer, he held first place state championship rankings in events that included the 100 butterfly in :51.49, the 50 freestyle in :21.95, the 100 freestyle in :47.44, the 200 freestyle in 1:41.56, and the 500 freestyle in 4:34.66.

He attended the 1984 Olympic trails in Indianapolis, Indiana, but did not qualify for the U.S. Olympic team.

Around February 1985 in Fort Dodge, Iowa, Oppel broke the Iowa State National High School Record in the 200-yard freestyle with a National High School record time of 1:36.36, also setting a state record in the 100 butterfly, and anchored West DesMoines Valley High School's team for the 4x100 freestyle relay. At the end of his high school swimming career, he had set five state High School records in various events, and one national record in the 200 freestyle. His High School practice sessions as a Senior were at least five days a week, having two workouts on Tuesdays and Thursdays, and he trained at the Des Moines Tech Pool and the West Des Moines Dowling Pool

Swimming as a High School Senior on April 4, 1985 representing West Des Moines High School, he placed fourth in the Men's 200-meter freestyle at the U.S. Short Course National Championships at Monterey Park, California, with a time of 1:36.53.

Opel qualified to swim in the 400, 200, and 100-meter freestyle events and the 200 and 100 butterfly at the Senior National meet in Mission, Viejo, California in early August 1985.

== Swimming for UCLA ==
Oppel enrolled in the University of California, Los Angeles (UCLA) beginning in the Fall of 1985, and swam for coach Ron Ballatore's UCLA Bruins swimming and diving team in National Collegiate Athletic Association (NCAA) competition. He graduated UCLA in 1989 with a B.A. in Psychology. During his time at UCLA, he had considerable success in national and international meets. He swam butterfly on a winning 400 Medley Relay team at the 1986 Madrid World Championships, and won the Long Course National Championship in the 200-meter freestyle in 1987. Through his Junior year, Oppel had not won a National NCAA title, though he placed second at the NCAA national finals in 1988 as a Junior in the 200-yard freestyle to Doug Djersten of Texas.

== 1988 Seoul Olympics ==
Oppel finished fifth in the 200-meter freestyle final with a time of 1:49.52 at the August, 1988 Olympic trials at the University of Texas in Austin and qualified as an alternate, though he was somewhat disappointed with his performance, as it was several seconds off his personal best time. In a few weeks of preliminary training for the Seoul Olympics, he was coached by U.S. Men's 1988 Olympic Head Coach Richard Quick.

Oppel earned a gold medal by swimming for the winning U.S. team in the preliminary heats of the men's 4×200-meter freestyle relay at the 1988 Summer Olympics in Seoul, Korea. Two days later, the U.S. team's winning time in the 4x200 relay finals was 7:12.51, though Oppel did not swim in the final. Oppel swam a 1:51.24 for his 200-meter freestyle lead off leg of the U.S. team's Heat One 4x200 preliminary, which recorded a combined time of 7:18.76. Oppel was diagnosed with bronchitis, and his time was around three seconds slower than his personal best. His time and diagnosed illness prevented his chances of swimming in the 4x200 relay final, and he was not selected to swim in the 4x100 freestyle relay final.

In international competition, Oppel took the gold medal in the Pan Pacs in 1985 in the 4x200-meter freestyle in Tokyo. At the Universiade in 1985 in Kobe, Japan, he captured gold medals in both of the freestyle relays. His most noteworthy achievement was at the 1987 Pan Pacs where he won the 200 freestyle, took gold in the two freestyle relays, and also won a silver in the 100 freestyle.

=== Post-swimming career ===
Subsequent to his swimming career, he completed a JD Degree in 1995 from Drake University Law School. He practiced law in the Muscatine, Iowa area for many years, serving primarily with the firm of Allbee and Barklay in general practice, and then in his own practice with the firm of Allbee Barclay Allison Denning & Oppel with a focus on Family law. After ending his swimming career, he married Natalie Jean Neill and later had two children while living in Muscatine. In September 2011, he was elected to serve on the Iowa State Bar Association's District 7 Board of Governors, functioning in Eastern Iowa.

== See also ==
- List of University of California, Los Angeles people
- List of Olympic medalists in swimming (men)
