= Susan Johnson (swimmer) =

American swimmer (born 1969)

Personal information
- Full name: Susan M. Johnson
- National team: United States
- Born: August 28, 1969 (age 56)
- Height: 5 ft 10 in (1.78 m)
- Weight: 146 lb (66 kg)

Sport
- Sport: Swimming
- Strokes: Breaststroke
- Club: Mission Bay Makos
- College team: University of Texas
Medal record
Women's swimming
Representing the United States
Pan Pacific Championships
Gold medal – first place	1987 Brisbane	4x100 m medley
Bronze medal – third place	1987 Brisbane	200 m breaststroke

Susan M. Johnson (born August 28, 1969), later known by her married name Susan Lipscomb, is an American former competition swimmer who represented the United States at the 1988 Summer Olympics in Seoul. She competed in the B Final of the women's 100-meter breaststroke and finished with the thirteenth-best time of all competitors (1:11.08).

Susan left competitive swimming after the Olympics in 1988. She resumed competitive swimming at Southern Methodist University in 1990. She placed third in the 100 yard breaststroke at the 1991 NCAA championships. In 1992 she placed first in the 100 yard breaststroke. She was the first female in the history of Southern Methodist University to win first place in a swimming event. She permanently retired from swimming at that time.

== See also ==
- List of University of Texas at Austin alumni
