= Nation's Capital Swim Club =

American Swim Club around Washington D.C.

- Full name: Nation's Capital Swim Club
- Nickname: The Finest Swimming in the Nation's Capital
- Short name: Nation's Capital; NCAP
- Sport: Swimming
- Founded: 1978
- League: USA Swimming
- Region: Potomac Valley Swimming
- Location: Washington, D.C. Metropolitan Area, U.S. Headquarters: Vienna, VA
- President: Spencer Ugast
- CEO: Tom Ugast
- Members: c. 3,000 (2024-2025)
- Main sponsor: TYR Sport
- Website: Official website
- The Club utilizes private aquatic facilities across the Washington Metropolitan Area

Nation's Capital Swimming, officially referred to as Nation's Capital Swim Club, commonly referred to as Nation's Capital or NCAP, is a professional competitive swim club based in the Washington metropolitan area, operating across multiple jurisdictions including Washington, D.C., Maryland, and Virginia. The club was originally founded in 1978 as the Curl-Burke Swim Club before undergoing a comprehensive rebranding and organizational restructuring in September 2012. It is a member of USA Swimming and operates under the local swimming committee of Potomac Valley Swimming. As of 2025, the organization is the largest competitive swimming program in the United States by membership, maintaining a roster of approximately 3,000 athletes. The club is led by CEO Tom Ugast and President Spencer Ugast.

NCAP has consistently achieved elite status within the USA Swimming Club Excellence program, holding the record for the most "Gold Medal" recognitions in the program's history. The club is also currently designated as a "Podium Club", which recognizes swim clubs achieving Gold Medal status for four consecutive years through the Club Excellence program. Beyond its competitive youth programs, the club has a partnership/sponsorship with TYR Sport who sponsors the recently renamed "Katie Ledecky Invitational". Financial operations are sustained through a combination of membership fees and merchandise sales, with the organization functioning as a major contributor to the DMV athletic economy.

NCAP is recognized for its extensive history of developing Olympic, Paralympic, and international-caliber athletes who have set numerous world records. Its most prominent alumna, Katie Ledecky, is the most decorated female swimmer and most decorated American woman in Olympic history, having trained with the club throughout her formative career. Other notable Olympic gold medalists who competed for the club or its predecessor include Tom Dolan, Mike Barrowman, and Ed Moses. The club's international influence extends to athletes. representing other nations, such as Markus Rogan and Sergio López Miró, as well as modern stars like Phoebe Bacon and Andrew Seliskar. In 2024, the club continued its legacy by sending multiple athletes to the 2024 Paris Olympic Games, including Erin Gemmell and multisport athlete Taylor Knibb.

== History ==
=== Founding as Curl-Burke Swim Club ===
The club was founded in 1978 as the Curl-Burke Swim Club in Burke, Virginia by coaches Rick Curl and Pete Morgan. Through the 1980s and 1990s, the team expanded across Northern Virginia and Maryland, pooling resources to attract top coaching talent. Curl-Burke quickly developed a national reputation for nurturing high-caliber specialists and Olympic champions.

Mike Barrowman put the club on the global map when he won gold and set a world record in the 200-meter breaststroke at the 1992 Summer Olympics. Following Barrowman's breakthrough, Tom Dolan claimed back-to-back gold medals in the 400-meter individual medley in 1996 and 2000. Other standout Olympians, like breaststroke world record holder Ed Moses and butterfly champion Mark Henderson, helped cement the club's legacy as a premier breeding ground for elite athletes.

=== Rick Curl controversy and rebranding ===
In 2012, reports surfaced that co-founder Rick Curl had a sexual relationship with a teenage swimmer, Kelley Davies, during the 1980s. The abuse was detailed in an exposé by The Orange County Register and on ABC's 20/20. In response, USA Swimming permanently banned Curl from the sport in early 2013.

To survive the fallout, protect its athletes, and better represent its wide geographic footprint, the club severed all ties with Curl and rebranded as the Nation's Capital Swim Club (NCAP) in September 2012. Under the leadership of new CEO Tom Ugast, the organization shifted to a transparent, privately owned club to strictly enforce ethical oversight and prioritize athlete safety above all else.

=== Era of National Prominence ===
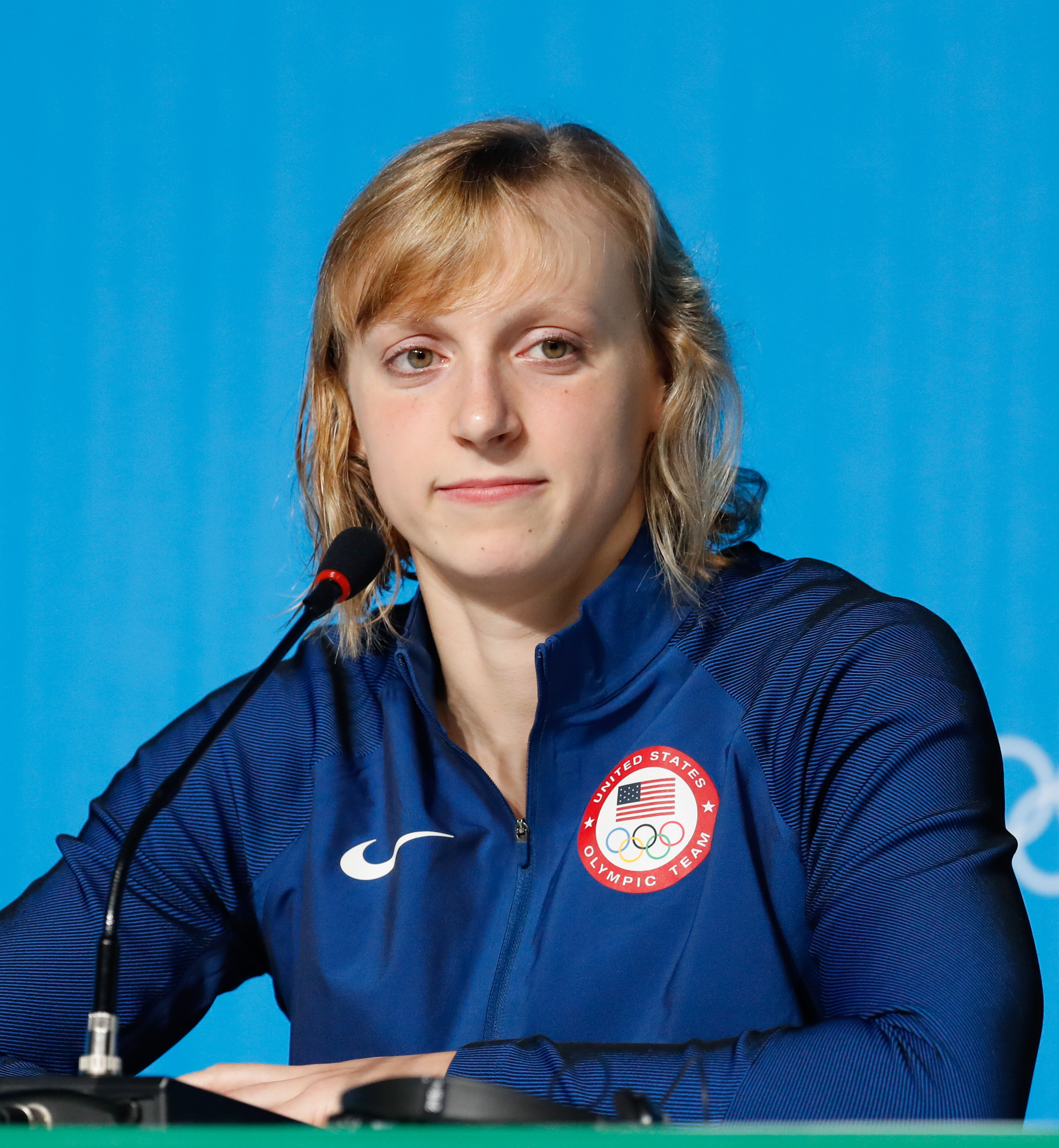
Katie Ledecky in 2016

Following the rebrand, NCAP dominated American club swimming. From 2015 to 2021, NCAP claimed the #1 ranking in USA Swimming's Club Excellence program for a historic seven consecutive years.

This golden era was spearheaded by generational talent Katie Ledecky. Training under coaches Yuri Suguiyama and Bruce Gemmell, she captured her first gold at the 2012 London Games as a 15-year-old. Ledecky went on to shatter multiple world records and win four gold medals at the 2016 Rio Olympics.

However, NCAP's success wasn't carried by Ledecky alone. The club's elite depth produced numerous U.S. National Team members and Olympians, including Andrew Gemmell and Jack Conger. The supportive and highly competitive environment was maintained by top-tier coaches like Sue Chen and Bruce Gemmell, both of whom served on U.S. National Team staffs.

=== Modern era and continued success ===
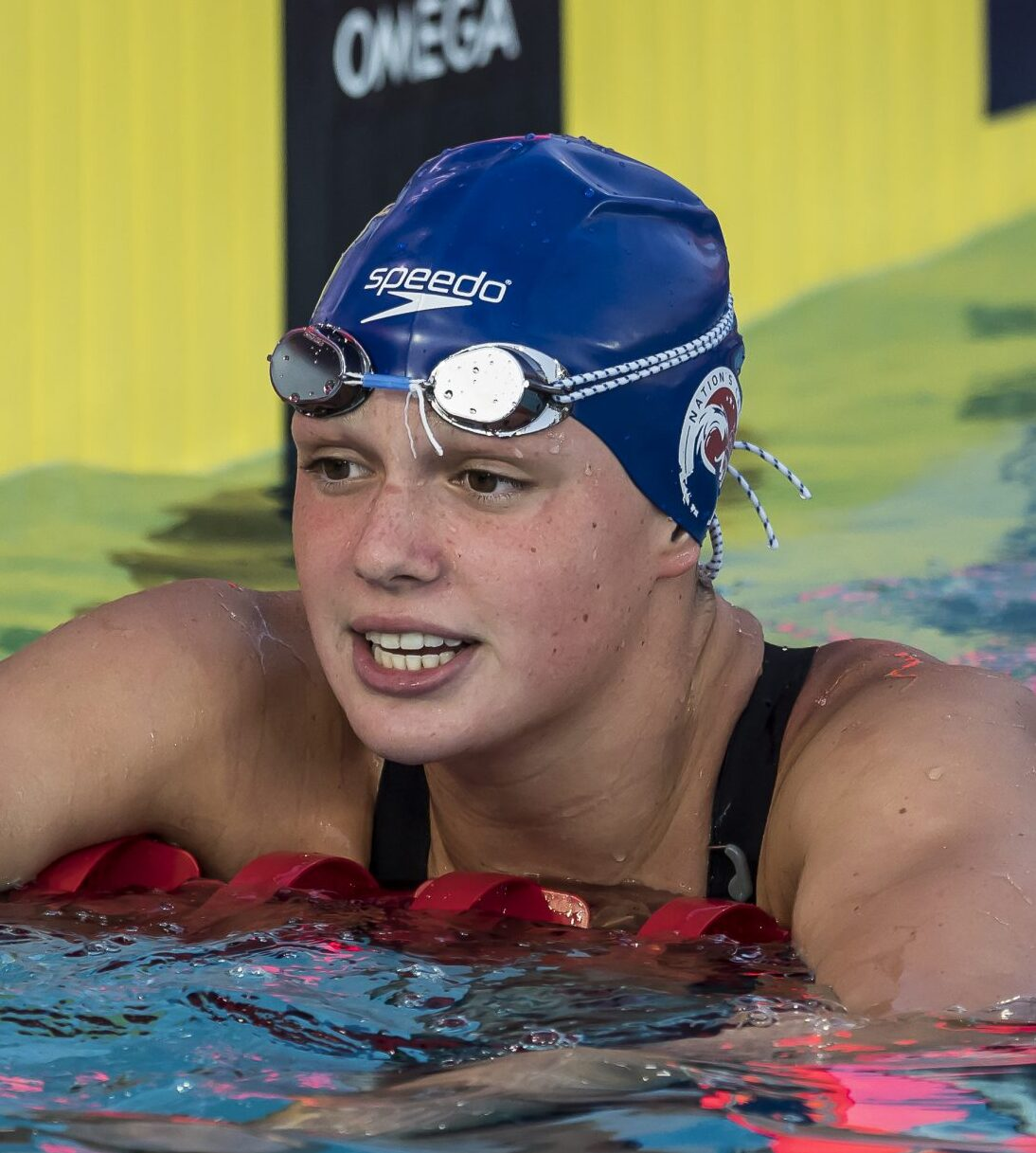
Phoebe Bacon at the 2019 Toyota U.S. Open

When the COVID-19 pandemic forced widespread closures in 2020, NCAP suspended practices but found creative ways, like dryland training, to keep its 3,000 members engaged. The club's resilience was on full display at the delayed Tokyo 2020 Olympics, where NCAP athletes Phoebe Bacon and Andrew Seliskar proudly joined Ledecky on the U.S. roster.

Today, NCAP remains a designated USA Swimming Gold and Podium Club, after having navigated intensified competition from other clubs like SwimMAC Carolina. The development program continues to produce athletes like Taylor Knibb and Erin Gemmell, with the latter winning a relay silver medal at the 2024 Paris Olympics. NCAP later reclaimed its #1 ranking in the 2026-27 Club Excellence, climbing to the top spot all the way from its #6 spot in the 2025-26 Club Excellence, making this NCAP’s 24th year as a Gold Medal Club and its 8th time finishing at the top spot.

== Programs and Structure ==
NCAP operates a multi-site program, consisting of 13 different sites across the DMV. This structure allows the club to serve a large number of swimmers, from novice age-groupers to post-graduate professionals. The program follows a tiered model, with swimmers progressing through different groups based on age, skill level, and commitment. The top training groups bring together the club's most elite athletes to train for national and international competitions, including the Olympic Games and the World Aquatics Championships.

The club organizes its competitive age-group pipeline into three main tiers: Bronze, Silver, and Gold. For younger swimmers, starting at 9 and under, the Bronze tier focuses on mastering legal technique across all four strokes and getting comfortable with competitive racing. As athletes get older, drop time, and refine their technique, they move up into the Silver groups. These squads are heavily geared toward 13- and 14-year-olds who are ready to step up their dedication and commit to a demanding five-day-a-week training schedule.

Once athletes reach the high school level, they transition into the Gold tier. These upper-level groups are designed specifically for swimmers setting their sights on championship-level meets within the Potomac Valley LSC and larger USA Swimming regional competitions. At the very top of the program's pyramid is the Gold I group, which is strictly for high-performing 14- to 18-year-olds hitting Senior Open race standards. Because balancing elite training with high school classes is intense, the club offers a massive mix of early morning (AM) and afternoon (PM) practice slots, along with early weekend sessions and dedicated dryland workouts.

== Locations ==
NCAP has 13 different locations spread across Virginia, DC, and Maryland. NCAP has two franchise sites, Burke & Alexandria.

Virginia:

- NCAP-Alexandria (Franchise)
- NCAP-Burke (Franchise)
- NCAP-NoVA (Tysons & Marymount)
- NCAP-Loudoun (Dulles South, Claude Moore & Ashburn)
- NCAP-West (Freedom Center, Warrenton & Vint Hill)

Washington DC:

- NCAP-AU (American University)

Maryland:

- NCAP-Prep (Georgetown Prep)
- NCAP-HA (Holton Arms)

== Finances ==
Financially, the club operates as a private S corporation, funded primarily by membership dues, meet fees, and corporate sponsorships. This financial model supports a large staff of professional coaches and establishes NCAP as one of the most well-resourced swim clubs in the U.S., with annual revenue estimated between $10 million and $50 million USD. The club currently has an annual budget of over $5 million USD.

Strategic partnerships with TYR Sport helps subsidize equipment and travel costs for athletes. Additionally, the club generates significant revenue by hosting large-scale events, such as the Katie Ledecky Invitational. Proceeds from these meets are reinvested into club infrastructure, including advanced underwater cameras and timing systems. To keep the sport accessible, NCAP allocates a portion of its budget to financial aid and scholarships for families across the Washington metropolitan area.

== USA Swimming Club Excellence Program ==
NCAP has been a dominant Gold Medal Club in USA Swimming's Club Excellence Program, which recognizes the nation's highest-performing clubs based on athlete performance. The club's top ranking for seven consecutive years (2015-2021) is the longest streak in the program's history. The club also holds the most Gold Medal recognitions all time at 24. Currently, NCAP is the #1-ranked club in the country, as a Gold Medal Club in the 2026-2027 USA Swimming Club Excellence Results, with over 75,451 points. NCAP is also one of the only 11 swim clubs recognized as a Podium Club.

== Olympic Alumni ==
NCAP has produced over 24 Olympians and Paralympians. Its most notable alumna is Katie Ledecky, the most decorated American woman in Olympic history. The club's history of producing Olympic gold medalists and world record holders includes athletes such as Mike Barrowman, Tom Dolan, and Ed Moses in the 1990s and 2000s. In more recent years, swimmers including Erin Gemmell, Phoebe Bacon, and Andrew Seliskar have represented the United States at the Tokyo 2020 and Paris 2024 Games. The organization regularly sends large contingents to the USA Olympic trials, having over 22 athletes qualify in 2000, 25 in 2016, and 24 in 2020, with many also competing at the World Aquatics Championships.

In addition to developing domestic talent, the club serves as a training base for international athletes. Notable international alumni include Olympic medalists Markus Rogan of Austria and Sergio Lopez Miro of Spain. The program also integrates adaptive sports, training world record-setting Paralympic medalists like Becca Meyers and Lawrence Sapp. Beyond swimming, several NCAP alumni have applied their aquatic foundations to succeed in multi-sport and winter Olympic disciplines; Taylor Knibb and Susan Williams have medaled for the U.S. in the triathlon, while former swimmer Carsten Vissering crossed over to compete nationally as a bobsledder.

=== U.S. Olympians ===
Name	Stroke / Event	College / University	Olympic Games (Results)	Notes	Ref.
Katie Ledecky	Freestyle	Stanford University	2012 London: (gold) 800 m freestyle; 2016 Rio: (gold) 200 m freestyle; (gold) 400 m freestyle; (gold) 800 m freestyle; (gold) 4×200 m freestyle relay; (silver) 4×100 m freestyle relay; 2020 Tokyo: (gold) 800 m freestyle; (gold) 1500 m freestyle; (silver) 400 m freestyle; (silver) 4×200 m freestyle relay; 2024 Paris: (gold) 800 m freestyle; (gold) 1500 m freestyle; (silver) 4×200 m freestyle relay; (bronze) 400 m freestyle	Most decorated U.S. female Olympian of all time (14 medals). World Record holder in 800m and 1500m freestyle.	Olympics
Tom Dolan	Medley (IM)	University of Michigan	1996 Atlanta: (gold) 400 m individual medley; 7th Place (200 m individual medley); 2000 Sydney: (gold) 400 m individual medley; (silver) 200 m individual medley	First to defend the Olympic 400m IM title. Former World Record holder. Inducted into ISHOF (2006).	Olympics
Mike Barrowman	Breaststroke	University of Michigan	1988 Seoul: 4th Place (200 m breaststroke); 1992 Barcelona: (gold) 200 m breaststroke	Pioneer of the "wave-style" breaststroke technique. Held the 200m breaststroke World Record for 13 years.	Olympics
Mark Henderson	Butterfly	Cal Berkeley	1996 Atlanta: (gold) 4×100 m medley relay	Swam the butterfly leg on the gold-medal winning medley relay that set a World Record.	Olympics
Ed Moses	Breaststroke	University of Virginia	2000 Sydney: (gold) 4×100 m medley relay; (silver) 100 m breaststroke	Former World Record holder in short course and long course breaststroke.	Olympics
Jack Conger	Butterfly, Freestyle	University of Texas	2016 Rio: (gold) 4×200 m freestyle relay	Swam in the prelims for the gold-medal winning relay. American Record holder (200y butterfly).	World Aquatics
Andrew Wilson	Breaststroke	Emory University	2020 Tokyo: (gold) 4×100 m medley relay; 6th Place (100 m breaststroke)	First NCAA Division III swimmer to qualify for the U.S. Olympic Swim Team.	World Aquatics
Erin Gemmell	Freestyle	University of Texas	2024 Paris: (silver) 4×200 m freestyle relay; 4th Place (200 m freestyle); 9th Place (100 m freestyle)	Anchored the U.S. relay to silver. Daughter of coach Bruce Gemmell.	World Aquatics
Phoebe Bacon	Backstroke	University of Wisconsin	2020 Tokyo: 5th Place (200 m backstroke); 2024 Paris: 4th Place (200 m backstroke)	Pan American Games Gold Medalist (2019). NCAA Champion (200 backstroke).	World Aquatics
Andrew Seliskar	Freestyle, Butterfly	Cal Berkeley	2020 Tokyo: 4th Place (4×200 m freestyle relay)	Pac-12 Swimmer of the Year (2019). World Junior Champion (2013).	World Aquatics
Andrew Gemmell	Open Water, Freestyle	University of Georgia	2012 London: 9th Place (1500 m freestyle)	World Championship Silver Medalist (Open Water 10k).	World Aquatics
Roque Santos	Breaststroke	Cal Berkeley	1992 Barcelona: Participated (200 m breaststroke)	Former U.S. National Champion (200 breaststroke).	Olympics

=== International, Paralympic & Multi-Sport Athletes ===
Name	Nation / Sport	College / University	Games (Results)	Notes	Ref.
Markus Rogan	Austria (Swimming)	Stanford University	2000 Sydney: Participated; 2004 Athens: (silver) 100 m backstroke; (silver) 200 m backstroke	Former World Record holder (200m backstroke SCM). 4-time Olympian.	World Aquatics
Sergio Lopez	Spain (Swimming)	American University; Indiana University	1988 Seoul: (bronze) 200 m breaststroke; 1992 Barcelona: 4th Place (200 m breaststroke)	Coached at West Virginia and Virginia Tech; renowned breaststroke specialist.	Olympics
Masami Tanaka	Japan (Swimming)	Hokkaido Tokai University	2000 Sydney: (bronze) 4×100 m medley relay; 2004 Athens: 4th Place (200 m breaststroke)	Multiple World Championship Short Course titles.	Olympics
Juan Pablo Valdivieso	Peru (Swimming)	Princeton University	2000 Sydney: Participated (200 m butterfly); 2004 Athens: Participated (100 m butterfly, 200 m butterfly)	A dual citizen of the United States and Peru; set multiple records before graduating from Princeton University.	World Aquatics
Frederik Hviid	Spain (Swimming)	American University	1996 Atlanta: Participated (400 m individual medley); 2000 Sydney: Participated	Two-time All-American in 400 IM and 1650 Freestyle; Bronze Medalist at 1999 SC World Championships.	Olympics
Alejandro Bermúdez	Colombia (Swimming)		1992 Barcelona: Participated; 1996 Atlanta: 13th Place (400 m individual medley); 2000 Sydney: Participated	Competed in three consecutive Summer Olympics spanning Backstroke, Medley, and Freestyle.	Olympics
Kristina Han	South Korea (Swimming)	Harvard University; Duke University	1988 Seoul: Participated	Represented South Korea at age 14.	Olympics
Becca Meyers	United States (Paralympic Swimming)	Franklin & Marshall College	2012 London: (silver) 200 m individual medley (SM13); (bronze) 100 m freestyle (S13); 2016 Rio: (gold) 400 m freestyle (S13); (gold) 100 m butterfly (S13); (gold) 200 m individual medley (SM13); (silver) 100 m freestyle (S13)	Multiple World Record holder (S13 classification). 2-time ESPY Award winner.	IPC
Taylor Knibb	United States (Triathlon)	Cornell University	2020 Tokyo: (silver) Mixed Relay; 16th Place (Individual); 2024 Paris: (silver) Mixed Relay; 19th Place (Individual Triathlon); 19th Place (Cycling Time Trial)	Youngest woman to qualify for the U.S. Olympic Triathlon team. Also competed in cycling at Paris 2024.	World Triathlon
Susan Williams	United States (Triathlon)	University of Alabama	2004 Athens: (bronze) Individual	First U.S. athlete to win an Olympic medal in Triathlon.	Olympics
Carsten Vissering	United States (Bobsled)	University of Southern California	2026 Milano Cortina: Participated (Four-man Bobsled)	NCAA champion in swimming (breaststroke) who transitioned to Bobsled to represent Team USA at the 2026 Winter Olympics.	Wikipedia
Lawrence Sapp	United States (Paralympic Swimming)	University of Cincinnati	2020 Tokyo: 5th Place (100 m butterfly S14); 2024 Paris: Participated	2017 World Para Swimming Champion (100m Backstroke).	IPC
