= Tom Jager =

American swimmer

Personal information
- Full name: Thomas Michael Jager
- Nickname: "Tom"
- National team: United States
- Born: October 6, 1964 (age 61) East St. Louis, Illinois, U.S.
- Height: 6 ft 3 in (1.91 m)
- Weight: 181 lb (82 kg)

Sport
- Sport: Swimming
- Strokes: Freestyle
- College team: University of California, Los Angeles
Medal record
Men's swimming
Representing United States
Olympic Games
Gold medal – first place	1984 Los Angeles	4×100 m freestyle
Gold medal – first place	1984 Los Angeles	4×100 m medley
Gold medal – first place	1988 Seoul	4×100 m freestyle
Gold medal – first place	1988 Seoul	4×100 m medley
Gold medal – first place	1992 Barcelona	4×100 m freestyle
Silver medal – second place	1988 Seoul	50 m freestyle
Bronze medal – third place	1992 Barcelona	50 m freestyle
World Championships (LC)
Gold medal – first place	1986 Madrid	50 m freestyle
Gold medal – first place	1986 Madrid	4×100 m freestyle
Gold medal – first place	1991 Perth	50 m freestyle
Gold medal – first place	1991 Perth	4×100 m freestyle
Bronze medal – third place	1986 Madrid	100 m freestyle
Pan Pacific Games
Gold medal – first place	1987 Brisbane	50 m freestyle
Gold medal – first place	1989 Tokyo	50 m freestyle
Gold medal – first place	1989 Tokyo	4×100 m freestyle
Gold medal – first place	1991 Edmonton	50 m freestyle
Gold medal – first place	1991 Edmonton	4×100 m freestyle
Pan American Games
Gold medal – first place	1995 Mar del Plata	4×100 m freestyle
Bronze medal – third place	1995 Mar del Plata	50 m freestyle
Summer Universiade
Silver medal – second place	1983 Edmonton	100 m freestyle
Silver medal – second place	1983 Edmonton	100 m butterfly
Silver medal – second place	1983 Edmonton	4x100 m freestyle

Thomas Michael Jager (born October 6, 1964) is an American former competition swimmer. He is five-time Olympic gold medalist in relay events, a two-time World Championship individual gold medalist for the 50-meter freestyle, and a former world record-holder in two events. Jager set the 50-meter freestyle world record on six occasions during his career. He held this record for over ten years from August 1989 to June 2000.

== Swimming career ==
Jager started his swimming career as a 6 year old “Gaslight Gator” in his hometown of Collinsville, IL. He then competed for the East St. Louis YMCA, before coming under the tutelage of Carol Pence “Penny” Taylor, his coach at the Parkway Swim Club in St. Louis. Taylor was a 1948 Olympic swimmer. She was instrumental in his development as a swimmer. Tom won numerous Illinois high school state meet titles as a Collinsville Kahok, and was the number one recruit in the nation his senior year.

Jager attended the University of California, Los Angeles (UCLA), and swam for coach Ron Ballatore's UCLA Bruins swimming and diving team in National Collegiate Athletic Association (NCAA) competition from 1983 to 1985. He won NCAA individual national championships in the 100-yard freestyle (1983, 1984), the 50-yard freestyle (1984, 1985), and the 100-yard backstroke (1985). In 1984, he was honored as the Pacific-10 Conference Swimmer of the Year.

He was also an eleven-time United States national open champion, with wide-ranging diversity that allowed him to win titles in three different strokes, freestyle, backstroke, and butterfly.

Jager won seven Olympic medals for the United States, competing in the 1984, 1988, and 1992 Olympics. He won five gold medals in relay events. He also won an individual silver medal in the 50-meter freestyle in 1988, and an individual bronze medal in the 50-meter freestyle in 1992.

At the World Championships, Jager won gold medals in the 50-meter freestyle in 1986 and 1991. He also won gold medals in the 50-meter freestyle at the Pan Pacific Swimming Championships in 1989 and 1991.

Though yard-based races are only competed in the United States, Jager also held the world record in the 50 yard freestyle of 19.05 seconds from 1990 until 2005.

In 1991, Jager competed against then 41 year old Olympic swimming legend Mark Spitz, who was attempting a comeback in the sport, hoping to qualify for the U.S. Olympic Trials in perhaps his historically best event, the 100 meter butterfly. The contest was over in the first 15 meters of the 50-meter butterfly race. Jager, who was considered the quickest starter in the world, was off the blocks and in the lead quickly. He widened his lead throughout the race. Jager won in 24.92 seconds, while Spitz finished 1 1/2 body lengths behind, in 26.70 seconds.

Jager and his friend and rival, Matt Biondi, were pioneers in making competitive swimming professional, which allowed athletes to compete beyond their collegiate years, the typical career-ending point for most high-level swimmers before the 1980s, as they often lacked financial resources to continue their careers. Biondi, like Jager, competed in the 1984, 1988, and 1992 Olympics. Biondi set numerous world records, and won multiple NCAA, Olympic and world championship medals.

Jager was inducted into the International Swimming Hall of Fame in 2001.

== Coaching career ==
In 2004, Jager became the head coach of the University of Idaho's Idaho Vandals women's swim team. Jager then accepted the head coaching position for the Washington State Cougars swim team at Washington State University in 2011. He is now the head coach of the Aspen Swim club in Colorado.

== Family ==
Tom is the youngest of a family of swimming siblings. While under a swimming scholarship at the University of Iowa, his older sister Diane was an All-American swimmer in the backstroke. His brother, Bill, qualified for Nationals while in high school and then went on to earn a full swimming scholarship at the University of Illinois. Bill and Tom won the Illinois High School Athletic Association state swimming title in the 100 backstroke for five years in a row, with Bill claiming the title his senior year in high school (1978) and Tom then winning four in a row (1979 - 1982). All three siblings went on to work as swimming coaches.

Tom and his wife, Becky, have two sons, Wyatt (born 1996) and Cy (born 1999), both of whom swam for his swimming club, the Gold Medal Swim Club. Wyatt swam in college for the Ohio State University, while Wyatt swam for the University of Denver.

== See also ==
- List of multiple Olympic gold medalists
- List of Olympic medalists in swimming (men)
- List of University of California, Los Angeles people
- List of World Aquatics Championships medalists in swimming (men)
- World record progression 50 metres freestyle
- World record progression 4 × 100 metres freestyle relay

Records
Preceded by Dano Halsall	Men's 50-meter freestyle world record-holder (long course); December 6, 1985 – June 26, 1986	Succeeded by Matt Biondi
Preceded by Matt Biondi	Men's 50-meter freestyle world record-holder (long course); August 13, 1987 – September 24, 1988	Succeeded by Matt Biondi
Preceded by Matt Biondi	Men's 50-meter freestyle world record-holder (long course); August 20, 1989 – June 16, 2000	Succeeded by Alexander Popov
