= Swimming at the 1992 Summer Olympics – Women's 400 metre freestyle =

Women's 400 metre freestyle at the Games of the XXV Olympiad
- Venue: Piscines Bernat Picornell
- Date: 28 July 1992 (heats & finals)
- Competitors: 33 from 24 nations
- Winning time: 4:07.18

Medalists
1st place, gold medalist(s)		Dagmar Hase	Germany
2nd place, silver medalist(s)		Janet Evans	United States
3rd place, bronze medalist(s)		Hayley Lewis	Australia

The women's 400 metre freestyle event at the 1992 Summer Olympics took place on 28 July at the Piscines Bernat Picornell in Barcelona, Spain.

== Records ==
Prior to this competition, the existing world and Olympic records were as follows.

World record	Janet Evans (USA)	4:03.85	Seoul, South Korea	22 September 1988
Olympic record	Janet Evans (USA)	4:03.85	Seoul, South Korea	22 September 1988

== Results ==
=== Heats ===
Rule: The eight fastest swimmers advance to final A (Q), while the next eight to final B (q).

Rank	Heat	Lane	Name	Nationality	Time	Notes
1	5	4	Janet Evans	United States	4:09.38	Q
2	5	3	Dagmar Hase	Germany	4:10.92	Q
3	5	5	Erika Hansen	United States	4:12.08	Q
4	4	3	Kerstin Kielgaß	Germany	4:12.50	Q
5	3	4	Hayley Lewis	Australia	4:12.95	Q
6	5	7	Malin Nilsson	Sweden	4:13.16	Q
7	3	3	Isabelle Arnould	Belgium	4:13.81	Q
8	5	6	Suzu Chiba	Japan	4:13.85	Q
9	3	6	Phillippa Langrell	New Zealand	4:14.00	q, NR
10	4	7	Olga Šplíchalová	Czechoslovakia	4:15.43	q, NR
11	4	5	Irene Dalby	Norway	4:16.05	q
12	3	5	Beatrice Câșlaru	Romania	4:16.23	q
13	4	2	Mette Jacobsen	Denmark	4:16.80	q, WD
14	5	2	Carla Negrea	Romania	4:17.00	q
15	3	2	Sandra Cam	Belgium	4:17.87	q
16	4	6	Manuela Melchiorri	Italy	4:19.18	q
17	5	1	Hana Černá	Czechoslovakia	4:19.87	q
18	4	4	Julie McDonald	Australia	4:20.16	
19	4	1	Samantha Foggo	Great Britain	4:22.26	
20	5	8	Itziar Esparza	Spain	4:22.27	
21	3	1	Jeanine Steenkamp	South Africa	4:23.33	AF
22	3	7	Yan Ming	China	4:23.69	
23	3	8	Laura Sánchez	Mexico	4:23.87	
24	2	5	Judit Kiss	Hungary	4:24.01	
25	4	1	Elizabeth Arnold	Great Britain	4:25.55	
26	2	3	María José Marenco	El Salvador	4:29.32	
27	1	6	Thanya Sridama	Thailand	4:29.64	
28	1	4	Joscelin Yeo	Singapore	4:29.76	
29	2	4	Erika González	Mexico	4:32.06	
30	1	5	Robyn Lamsam	Hong Kong	4:32.23	
31	2	6	Claudia Fortin	Honduras	4:37.58	
32	1	3	May Ooi	Singapore	4:37.77	
33	2	2	Corinne Leclair	Mauritius	4:43.53	

=== Finals ===
==== Final B ====
Rank	Lane	Name	Nationality	Time	Notes
9	4	Phillippa Langrell	New Zealand	4:12.96	NR
10	7	Sandra Cam	Belgium	4:14.11	
11	3	Irene Dalby	Norway	4:14.46	
12	6	Beatrice Câșlaru	Romania	4:14.90	
13	2	Carla Negrea	Romania	4:14.92	
14	5	Olga Šplíchalová	Czechoslovakia	4:16.41	
15	1	Manuela Melchiorri	Italy	4:20.75	
16	8	Hana Černá	Czechoslovakia	4:21.50	

==== Final A ====
Rank	Lane	Name	Nationality	Time	Notes
1st place, gold medalist(s)	5	Dagmar Hase	Germany	4:07.18	
2nd place, silver medalist(s)	4	Janet Evans	United States	4:07.37	
3rd place, bronze medalist(s)	2	Hayley Lewis	Australia	4:11.22	
4	3	Erika Hansen	United States	4:11.50	
5	6	Kerstin Kielgaß	Germany	4:11.52	
6	1	Isabelle Arnould	Belgium	4:13.75	
7	7	Malin Nilsson	Sweden	4:14.10	
8	8	Suzu Chiba	Japan	4:15.71	
