= Swimming at the 1992 Summer Olympics – Women's 800 metre freestyle =

Women's 800 metre freestyle at the Games of the XXV Olympiad
- Venue: Piscines Bernat Picornell
- Date: 30 July 1992 (heats & final)
- Competitors: 26 from 19 nations
- Winning time: 8:25.52

Medalists
1st place, gold medalist(s)		Janet Evans	United States
2nd place, silver medalist(s)		Hayley Lewis	Australia
3rd place, bronze medalist(s)		Jana Henke	Germany

The women's 800 metre freestyle event at the 1992 Summer Olympics took place on 30 July at the Piscines Bernat Picornell in Barcelona, Spain.

== Records ==
Prior to this competition, the existing world and Olympic records were as follows.

World record	Janet Evans (USA)	8:16.22	Tokyo, Japan	20 August 1989
Olympic record	Janet Evans (USA)	8:20.20	Seoul, South Korea	24 September 1988

== Results ==
=== Heats ===
Rule: The eight fastest swimmers advance to final (Q).

Rank	Heat	Lane	Name	Nationality	Time	Notes
1	4	4	Janet Evans	United States	8:32.69	Q
2	4	5	Hayley Lewis	Australia	8:33.04	Q
3	2	5	Jana Henke	Germany	8:35.11	Q
4	2	4	Erika Hansen	United States	8:36.56	Q
5	3	3	Phillippa Langrell	New Zealand	8:38.43	Q, NR
6	3	5	Irene Dalby	Norway	8:38.58	Q
7	4	6	Isabelle Arnould	Belgium	8:40.86	Q
8	2	6	Olga Šplíchalová	Czechoslovakia	8:42.16	Q
9	3	6	Kerstin Kielgaß	Germany	8:43.52	
10	4	3	Beatrice Câșlaru	Romania	8:44.17	
11	2	2	Carla Negrea	Romania	8:48.36	
12	2	3	Manuela Melchiorri	Italy	8:50.14	
13	2	7	Samantha Foggo	Great Britain	8:50.17	
14	4	1	Sandra Cam	Belgium	8:50.91	
15	3	4	Julie McDonald	Australia	8:51.59	
16	4	7	Itziar Esparza	Spain	8:55.65	
17	3	7	Elizabeth Arnold	Great Britain	8:56.04	
18	3	1	Judit Kiss	Hungary	8:58.16	NR
19	3	2	Jeanine Steenkamp	South Africa	8:59.62	AF
20	3	8	María José Marenco	El Salvador	9:09.41	
21	2	1	Laura Sánchez	Mexico	9:10.31	
22	1	4	Claudia Fortin	Honduras	9:10.54	
23	1	3	Thanya Sridama	Thailand	9:10.58	
24	4	2	Yan Ming	China	9:14.63	
25	4	8	Erika González	Mexico	9:17.18	
	1	5	May Ooi	Singapore	DNS	

=== Final ===
Rank	Lane	Name	Nationality	Time	Notes
1st place, gold medalist(s)	4	Janet Evans	United States	8:25.52	
2nd place, silver medalist(s)	5	Hayley Lewis	Australia	8:30.34	
3rd place, bronze medalist(s)	3	Jana Henke	Germany	8:30.99	
4	2	Phillippa Langrell	New Zealand	8:35.57	NR
5	7	Irene Dalby	Norway	8:37.12	
6	8	Olga Šplíchalová	Czechoslovakia	8:37.66	
7	6	Erika Hansen	United States	8:39.25	
8	1	Isabelle Arnould	Belgium	8:41.86	
