= Great Britain at the 1992 Summer Olympics =

- Flag of the United Kingdom
- IOC code: GBR
- NOC: British Olympic Association

in Barcelona
- Competitors: 371 (229 men and 142 women) in 23 sports
- Flag bearers: Steve Redgrave (opening); Linford Christie (closing)
- Medals Ranked 13th: Gold 5 Silver 3 Bronze 12 Total 20

Summer Olympics appearances (overview)
- 1896; 1900; 1904; 1908; 1912; 1920; 1924; 1928; 1932; 1936; 1948; 1952; 1956; 1960; 1964; 1968; 1972; 1976; 1980; 1984; 1988; 1992; 1996; 2000; 2004; 2008; 2012; 2016; 2020; 2024; 2028

Other related appearances
- 1906 Intercalated Games

Great Britain, represented by the British Olympic Association (BOA), competed at the 1992 Summer Olympics in Barcelona, Spain. British athletes have competed in every Summer Olympic Games. A total of 371 athletes represented Great Britain and the team won twenty medals, five gold, three silver and twelve bronze. This equalled the number of golds won at the previous three Summer Games but was the lowest total medals achieved since the Montreal Games in 1976. Archer Simon Terry and hurdlers Sally Gunnell and Kriss Akabusi each won two medals.

== Medallists ==
The following British athletes won medals at the Games. In the 'by discipline' sections below, medallists' names are emboldened.

Medals by discipline
Discipline	Gold medal	Silver medal	Bronze medal	Total
Athletics	2	0	4	6
Rowing	2	0	0	2
Cycling	1	0	0	1
Judo	0	2	2	4
Canoeing	0	1	0	1
Archery	0	0	2	2
Boxing	0	0	1	1
Field hockey	0	0	1	1
Sailing	0	0	1	1
Swimming	0	0	1	1
Total	5	3	12	20

Medal	Name	Sport	Event
Gold	Linford Christie	Athletics	Men's 100 metres
Gold	Sally Gunnell	Athletics	Women's 400 metres hurdles
Gold	Chris Boardman	Cycling	Men's individual pursuit
Gold	Matthew Pinsent, Steve Redgrave	Rowing	Men's coxless pair
Gold	Garry Herbert, Greg Searle, Jonny Searle	Rowing	Men's coxed pair
Silver	Gareth Marriott	Canoeing	Men's slalom C-1
Silver	Raymond Stevens	Judo	Men's 95 kg
Silver	Nicola Fairbrother	Judo	Women's 56 kg
Bronze	Simon Terry	Archery	Men's individual
Bronze	Steven Hallard, Richard Priestman, Simon Terry	Archery	Men's team
Bronze	Kriss Akabusi	Athletics	Men's 400 metres hurdles
Bronze	Kriss Akabusi, Roger Black, David Grindley, Du'aine Ladejo (heats), John Regis, Mark Richardson (heats)	Athletics	Men's 4 × 400 metres relay
Bronze	Steve Backley	Athletics	Men's javelin throw
Bronze	Sandra Douglas, Sally Gunnell, Phylis Smith, Jennifer Stoute	Athletics	Women's 4 × 400 metres relay
Bronze	Robin Reid	Boxing	Men's light middleweight
Bronze	Great Britain national women's field hockey team: Jill Atkins; Lisa Bayliss; Karen Brown; Vickey Dixon; Susan Fraser; Wendy Fraser; Kathryn Johnson; Sandy Lister; Jackie McWilliams; Tammy Miller; Helen Morgan; Mary Nevill; Mandy Nicholls; Alison Ramsay; Jane Sixsmith; Joanne Thompson	Field hockey	Women's competition
Bronze	Sharon Rendle	Judo	Women's 52 kg
Bronze	Kate Howey	Judo	Women's 66 kg
Bronze	Nick Gillingham	Swimming	Men's 200-metre breaststroke
Bronze	Robert Cruickshank, Lawrie Smith, Ossie Stewart	Sailing	Soling

== Competitors ==
The following is the list of number of competitors in the Games.

Sport	Men	Women	Total
Archery	3	3	6
Athletics	52	39	91
Badminton	6	6	12
Boxing	10	–	10
Canoeing	18	7	25
Cycling	13	3	16
Diving	1	3	4
Equestrian	8	4	12
Fencing	10	5	15
Field hockey	15	16	31
Gymnastics	6	4	10
Judo	7	7	14
Modern pentathlon	3	–	3
Rowing	28	18	46
Sailing	13	4	17
Shooting	6	1	7
Swimming	18	12	30
Synchronized swimming	–	3	3
Table tennis	3	3	6
Tennis	2	4	6
Weightlifting	6	–	6
Wrestling	1	–	1
Total	229	142	371

== Archery ==
In the sixth appearance by Great Britain in modern Olympic archery, the men's team won a bronze medal and Simon Terry added another individual bronze. Alison Williamson added another top eight finish.

Men

Athlete	Event	Ranking round		Round of 32	Round of 16	Quarterfinals	Semi-finals	Bronze medal finals	
Athlete	Event	Score	Seed	Opposition Result	Opposition Result	Opposition Result	Opposition Result	Opposition Result	Rank
Steven Hallard	Individual	1285	23	Gammelgaard (DEN); W 103–98	Grov (NOR); L 99–104	Did not advance			13
Richard Priestman	Individual	1257	41	Did not advance					41
Simon Terry	Individual	1291	20	Anchondo (MEX); W 105–94	Yesheyev (EUN); W 104–102	Barrs (USA); W 108–108	Chung (KOR); L 102–108	Grov (NOR); W 109–103	Bronze medal
Steven Hallard, Richard Priestman, Simon Terry	Team	3833	6	N/A	Germany; W 233–231	Australia; W 242–236	Spain; L 234–236	France; W 233–231	Bronze medal

Women

Athlete	Event	Ranking round		Round of 32	Round of 16	Quarterfinals	Semi-finals	Finals	
Athlete	Event	Score	Seed	Opposition Result	Opposition Result	Opposition Result	Opposition Result	Opposition Result	Rank
Joanne Edens	Individual	1264	36	Did not advance					36
Sylvia Harris	Individual	1230	46	Did not advance					46
Alison Williamson	Individual	1223	8	Verstegen (NED); W 107–100	Bonal (FRA); L 107–108	Did not advance			8
Joanne Edens, Sylvia Harris, Alison Williamson	Team	3817	9	N/A	Sweden; L 229–239	Did not advance			13

== Athletics ==
Men

Track

Athlete	Event	Heat		Quarter Final		Semi Final		Final	
Athlete	Event	Time	Rank	Time	Rank	Time	Rank	Time	Rank
Marcus Adam	100 metres	10.57	2 Q	10.35	5	did not advance			
Linford Christie	100 metres	10.48	1 Q	10.07	1 Q	10.00	2 Q	9.96	1st place, gold medalist(s)
Marcus Adam	200 metres	20.62	1 Q	20.43	1 Q	20.63	4 Q	20.80	8
Linford Christie	200 metres	21.23	2 Q	20.52	3 Q	20.38	5	did not advance	
John Regis	200 metres	20.63	1 Q	20.16	2 Q	20.09	2 Q	20.55	5
Roger Black	400 metres	45.94	2 Q	45.28	3 Q	44.72	5	did not advance	
David Grindley	400 metres	45.79	2 Q	44.91	2 Q	44.47	4 Q	44.75	6
Derek Redmond	400 metres	45.03	1 Q	45.02	1 Q	DNF	—N/a	did not advance	
Steve Heard	800 metres	1:46.42	1 Q	—N/a		1:46.19	6	did not advance	
Tom McKean	800 metres	1:47.85	1 Q	—N/a		1:48.77	4	did not advance	
Curtis Robb	800 metres	1:46.16	1 Q	—N/a		1:45.25	1 Q	1:45.57	6
Steve Crabb	1500 metres	3:41.00	9	—N/a		did not advance			
Kevin McKay	1500 metres	3:37.39	5 Q	—N/a		3:40.80	10	did not advance	
Matthew Yates	1500 metres	3:38.73	5 Q	—N/a		3:40.53	12	did not advance	
Jack Buckner	5000 metres	13:37.14	5	—N/a				did not advance	
Rob Denmark	5000 metres	13:22.41	2 Q	—N/a				13:27.76	7
Ian Hamer	5000 metres	13:40.20	5	—N/a				did not advance	
Paul Evans	10,000 metres	28:15.70	3 Q	—N/a				28:29.83	11
Eamonn Martin	10,000 metres	29:35.65	19	—N/a				did not advance	
Richard Nerurkar	10,000 metres	28:24.35	3 Q	—N/a				28:48.48	17
Colin Jackson	110 metres hurdles	13.10	1 Q	13.57	2 Q	13.19	2 Q	13.46	7
Tony Jarrett	110 metres hurdles	13.31	1 Q	13.43	2 Q	13.29	3 Q	13.26	4
Hugh Teape	110 metres hurdles	13.68	2 Q	13.50	5 q	13.60	4 Q	14.00	8
Kriss Akabusi	400 metres hurdles	48.98	1 Q	—N/a		48.01	1 Q	47.82	3rd place, bronze medalist(s)
Max Robertson	400 metres hurdles	DNF	—N/a	—N/a		did not advance			
Tom Buckner	3000 metres steeplechase	8:28.36	5 Q	—N/a		8:32.89	8	did not advance	
Tom Hanlon	3000 metres steeplechase	8:27.46	2 Q	—N/a		8:26.91	5 Q	8:18.14	6
Colin Walker	3000 metres steeplechase	8:29.34	3 Q	—N/a		8:34.82	8	did not advance	
Marcus Adam; Tony Jarrett; John Regis; Linford Christie	4 × 100 metres relay	38.64	2 Q	—N/a				38.08	4
Roger Black; David Grindley; Kriss Akabusi; John Regis; Du'aine Ladejo*; Mark Richardson*	4 × 400 metres relay	3:01.20	2 Q	—N/a				2:59.73	3rd place, bronze medalist(s)
Steve Brace	Marathon	—N/a						2:17:49	27
Paul Davies-Hale	Marathon	—N/a						2:21:15	33
Dave Long	Marathon	—N/a						2:20:51	31
Chris Maddocks	20 kilometres walk	—N/a						1:28:45	16
Andrew Penn	20 kilometres walk	—N/a						1:31:40	23
Martin Rush	20 kilometres walk	—N/a						1:31:56	24
Paul Blagg	50 kilometres walk	—N/a						4:23:10	30
Les Morton	50 kilometres walk	—N/a						4:09:34	21

Field

Athlete	Event	Qualifying		Final	
Athlete	Event	Mark	Rank	Mark	Rank
Dalton Grant	high jump	2.15	29	did not advance	
Brendan Reilly	high jump	2.23	16	did not advance	
Steve Smith	high jump	2.29	2 Q	2.24	12
Mike Edwards	pole vault	5.20	26	did not advance	
Mark Forsythe	long jump	7.71	22	did not advance	
Francis Agyepong	triple jump	16.55	18	did not advance	
Jonathan Edwards	triple jump	15.76	35	did not advance	
Julian Golley	triple jump	16.18	26	did not advance	
Paul Edwards	shot put	19.03	15	did not advance	
Simon Williams	discus throw	53.12	28	did not advance	
Paul Head	hammer throw	69.58	23	did not advance	
Steve Backley	javelin throw	80.76	2 Q	83.38	3rd place, bronze medalist(s)
Nigel Bevan	javelin throw	72.78	13	did not advance	
Mick Hill	javelin throw	79.66	5 Q	75.50	11

Combined

Athlete	Event	100m	LJ	SP	HJ	400m	110m H	D	PV	J	1500m	Points	Rank
David Bigham	Decathlon	11.14	7.26	12.56	1.94	47.73	14.94	37.42	4.50	60.52	4:27.42	7754	18

Women

Track

Athlete	Event	Heat		Quarter Final		Semi Final		Final	
Athlete	Event	Time	Rank	Time	Rank	Time	Rank	Time	Rank
Stephi Douglas	100 metres	11.65	3 Q	11.77	8	did not advance			
Simmone Jacobs	200 metres	23.90	4 Q	23.61	7	did not advance			
Jennifer Stoute	200 metres	23.15	2 Q	22.73	4 Q	23.01	6	did not advance	
Sandra Douglas	400 metres	52.91	3 Q	51.41	4 Q	51.96	6	did not advance	
Lorraine Hanson	400 metres	52.66	4 Q	53.60	6	did not advance			
Phylis Smith	400 metres	53.59	1 Q	51.32	1 Q	50.40	4 Q	50.87	8
Lorraine Baker	800 metres	2:00.50	4 q	—N/a		2:02.17	7	did not advance	
Diane Edwards	800 metres	2:00.39	3 q	—N/a		2:04.32	7	did not advance	
Paula Fryer	800 metres	2:02.72	5	—N/a		did not advance			
Maxine Newman	1500 metres	4:15.16	8	—N/a		did not advance			
Kirsty Wade	1500 metres	4:08.30	8 Q	—N/a		4:11.36	9	did not advance	
Ann Williams	1500 metres	DQ	—N/a	—N/a		did not advance			
Yvonne Murray	3000 metres	8:51.16	2 Q	—N/a				8:55.85	8
Alison Wyeth	3000 metres	8:43.93	4 q	—N/a				9:00.23	9
Lisa York	3000 metres	8:47.71	4	—N/a				did not advance	
Jill Hunter	10,000 metres	32:18.34	4 Q	—N/a				31:46.49	10
Liz McColgan	10,000 metres	32:07.25	3 Q	—N/a				31:26.11	5
Andrea Wallace	10,000 metres	34:29.47	22	—N/a				did not advance	
Jacqui Agyepong	100 metres hurdles	13.25	4 Q	13.36	7	did not advance			
Kay Morley-Brown	100 metres hurdles	13.44	6	did not advance					
Lesley-Ann Skeete	100 metres hurdles	13.42	6	did not advance					
Louise Fraser	400 metres hurdles	57.49	5	—N/a		did not advance			
Sally Gunnell	400 metres hurdles	54.98	1 Q	—N/a		53.78	1 Q	53.23	1st place, gold medalist(s)
Gowry Retchakan	400 metres hurdles	55.62	3 Q	—N/a		54.63	5	did not advance	
Phylis Smith; Sandra Douglas; Jennifer Stoute; Sally Gunnell	4 × 400 metres relay	3:25.20	2 Q	—N/a				3:24.23	3rd place, bronze medalist(s)
Sally Eastall	Marathon	—N/a						2:41:20	13
Sally Ellis	Marathon	—N/a						2:54:41	27
Véronique Marot	Marathon	—N/a						2:42:55	16
Lisa Langford	10 kilometres walk	—N/a						51:44	35
Vicky Lupton	10 kilometres walk	—N/a						DQ	—N/a
Betty Sworowski	10 kilometres walk	—N/a						50:14	32

Field

Athlete	Event	Qualifying		Final	
Athlete	Event	Mark	Rank	Mark	Rank
Jo Jennings	high jump	1.86	30	did not advance	
Debbie Marti	high jump	1.92	1 Q	1.91	9
Oluyinka Idowu	long jump	6.29	23	did not advance	
Fiona May	long jump	NM	—N/a	did not advance	
Joanne Wise	long jump	5.87	29	did not advance	
Myrtle Augee	shot put	16.53	7	did not advance	
Jackie McKernan	discus throw	51.94	14	did not advance	
Tessa Sanderson	javelin throw	60.70	4 Q	63.58	4

Combined

Athlete	Event	100m H	HJ	SP	200m	LJ	J	800m	Points	Rank
Clova Court	Heptathlon	13.48	1.58	13.85	23.95	6.10	52.12	2:31.21	5994	19

== Badminton ==
Men

Athlete	Event	Round 1	Round 2	Round 3	Quarterfinals	Semi-finals	Final	
Athlete	Event	Opposition Result	Opposition Result	Opposition Result	Opposition Result	Opposition Result	Opposition Result	Rank
Darren Hall	Men's singles	Humble (CAN); W 15-6 15-4	Zhao (CHN); L 6-15 9-15	Did not advance				
Anders Nielsen	Men's singles	Kukasemkij (THA); L 18-16 12-15 16-17	Did not advance					
Andy Goode; Chris Hunt	Men's doubles	Machida & Miya (JPN); W 15-10 9-15 15-12	Lee & Shon (KOR); L 2-15 15-7 4-15	N/A	Did not advance			
Nick Ponting; Dave Wright	Men's doubles	Frey & Kuhl (GER); W 15-7 15-9	Mainaky & Subagja (INA); L 3-15 9-15	N/A	Did not advance			

Women

Athlete	Event	Round 1	Round 2	Round 3	Quarterfinals	Semi-finals	Final	
Athlete	Event	Opposition Result	Opposition Result	Opposition Result	Opposition Result	Opposition Result	Opposition Result	Rank
Joanne Muggeridge	Women's singles	Mol (FRA); W 11-5 11-7	Bisht (IND); W 11-7 11-8	Huang (CHN); L 3-11 2-11	Did not advance			
Helen Troke	Women's singles	Bye	Tang (CHN); L 3-11 1-11	Did not advance				
Julie Bradbury; Gillian Clark	Women's doubles	Sulistianingsih & Tendean (INA); W 15-10 4-15 17-15	Schmidt & Ubben (GER); W 18-15 15-5	N/A	Hwang & Chung (KOR); L 5-15 5-15	Did not advance		
Gillian Gowers; Sara Sankey	Women's doubles	Delvingt & Mol (FRA); W 15-10 9-15 15-12	C. Bengtsson & M. Bengtsson (SWE); L 8-15 8-15	N/A	Did not advance			

== Boxing ==
Great Britain's sent 10 boxers to the Games. The squad included Adrian Dodson who had previously competed for Guyana at the 1988 Games under the name Adrian Carew. Four British boxers were knocked out in the first round of competition, two were knocked out in the second round and three lost in the quarter finals. Robin Reid, a 21-year-old bookmaker's cashier nicknamed 'The Grim Reaper', won the only medal, a bronze in the light middleweight division after he was beaten in the semi-final by Orhan Delibaş.

Athlete	Event	Round of 32	Round of 16	Quarterfinals	Semi-finals	Final	
Athlete	Event	Opposition Result	Opposition Result	Opposition Result	Opposition Result	Opposition Result	Rank
Paul Ingle	Light flyweight	Baba (GHA); W 9–7	Choi (PRK); L 12–13	did not advance			
Rowan Williams	Flyweight	Bye	Ahialey (GHA); W 11–3	Velasco (PHI); L 6–7	did not advance		
Brian Carr	Featherweight	Reyes (ESP); L 10–22	did not advance				
Robert Clarke	Lightweight	Irwin (CAN); L RSCH	did not advance				
Peter Richardson	Light welterweight	Forrest (USA); W 14–3	Altankhuyag (MGL); W 21–4	Doroftei (ROM); L 20–7	did not advance		
Adrian Dodson	Welterweight	Kawakami (JPN); W RSC-3	Vaştag (ROM); L 5–6	did not advance			
Robin Reid	Light middleweight	Thomas (BAH); W KO-1	Maleckis (LTU); W 10–3	Klemetsen (NOR); W 20–10	Delibaş (NED); L 3–8	Did not advance	Bronze medal
Mark Edwards	Middleweight	Byrd (USA); L 3–21	did not advance				
Stephen Wilson	Light heavyweight	Bye	Masoe (ASA); W 12–3	Zaulichniy (EUN); L 0–13	did not advance		
Paul Lawson	Heavyweight	Nicholson (USA); L 2–10	did not advance				

Key:

- KO-x = Knock-out-in round x
- PTS = Overall jury points
- RSC = Referee stopped contest
- RSCH = Referee stopped contest due to head injury

== Canoeing ==
Slalom

Athlete	Event	Run 1	Run 2	Total	Rank
Athlete	Event	Score	Score	Score	Rank
Gareth Marriott	Men's slalom C-1	126.13	113.69	113.69	2nd place, silver medalist(s)
Chris Arrowsmith; Paul Brain	Men's slalom C-2	174.50	211.89	174.50	17
Andrew Clough; Iain Clough	Men's slalom C-2	140.56	135.82	135.82	12
Richard Fox	Men's slalom K-1	119.73	108.85	108.85	4
Melvyn Jones	Men's slalom K-1	110.40	130.70	110.40	7
Ian Raspin	Men's slalom K-1	116.91	115.52	115.52	20
Rachel Fox	Women's slalom K-1	148.82	147.64	147.64	16
Karen Like	Women's slalom K-1	148.34	142.26	142.26	13
Lynn Simpson	Women's slalom K-1	140.38	144.24	140.38	10

Sprint

Athlete	Event	Heat		Repechage		Semi Final		Final	
Athlete	Event	Time	Rank	Time	Rank	Time	Rank	Time	Rank
Eric Jamieson	Men's C-1 500 metres	1:54.80	2 Q	—N/a		1:55.90	3 Q	—N/a	DSQ
Andrew Train	Men's C-1 1000 metres	4:07.44	2 Q	—N/a		4:09.94	4 Q	4:12.58	6
Andrew Train; Stephen Train	Men's C-2 1000 metres	3:40.13	5 q	N/A		3:46.36	3	did not advance	
Simon Parsons	Men's K-1 500 metres	1:47.50	7 R	1:46.32	5	did not advance			
Graham Burns	Men's K-1 1000 metres	3:43.84	4 R	3:38.48	4	did not advance			
Ivan Lawler; Grayson Bourne	Men's K-2 500 metres	1:36.00	5 R	1:33.96	3 Q	1:32.38	7	did not advance	
James Block; Reuben Burgess	Men's K-2 1000 metres	3:24.16	5 R	3:19.78	3 Q	3:23.77	9	did not advance	
Alison Thorogood	Women's K-1 500 metres	1:57.63	4	N/A		did not advance			
Hilary Dresser; Andrea Dallaway; Alison Thorogood; Sandra Troop	Women's K-4 500 metres	1:40.22	7 q	N/A		1:41.24	5	did not advance	

== Cycling ==
Sixteen cyclists, thirteen men and three women, represented Great Britain in 1992. Chris Boardman won gold in the individual pursuit.

=== Road ===
Men

Athlete	Event	Time	Rank
David Cook	Men's road race	4:35.56	60
Simeon Hempsall	Men's road race	4:35.56	36
Matthew Stephens	Men's road race	4:35.56	61
Gary Dighton; Stephen Farrell; Matt Illingworth; Peter Longbottom	Men's team time trial	2:12:14	14

Women

Athlete	Event	Time	Rank
Sally Hodge	Women's road race	2:05.03	24
Louise Jones	Women's road race	2:08.13	40
Marie Purvis	Women's road race	2:.14.10	45

=== Track ===
Athlete	Event	Semi Final		Final	
Athlete	Event	Points	Rank	Points	Rank
Simon Lillistone	Men's points race	9	1 Q	5	18

Athlete	Event	Qualifying		Quarter Final	Semi Final	Final	Rank
Athlete	Event	Time	Rank	Opponent Result	Opponent Result	Opponent Result	Rank
Chris Boardman	Men's individual pursuit	4:27.357 WR	1 Q	Petersen (DEN); Won 4:24.496 WR	Kingsland (AUS); Won 4:29.332	Lehmann (GER); Won	1st place, gold medalist(s)
Chris Boardman; Paul Jennings; Bryan Steel; Glen Sword	Men's team pursuit	4:19.126	5 Q	Denmark; Lost 4:14.350	Did not advance		

Athlete	Event	Result	
Athlete	Event	Time	Rank
Anthony Stirrat	Men's track time trial	1:06.522	14

== Diving ==
Four British divers competed at the Games; Naomi Bishop in the women's 3 m individual springboard; Hayley Allen and Lesley Ward in the women's 10 m platform; and Robert 'Bob' Morgan in both the men's 3 m individual springboard and 10 m platform. Morgan achieved the squad's best result finishing 5th in the 10 m platform, an event in which he had won the European bronze medal in 1991 and gold at the 1990 Commonwealth Games.

Men

Athlete	Events	Preliminary		Final	
Athlete	Events	Points	Rank	Points	Rank
Bob Morgan (diver)	3 m individual springboard	366.66	15	Did not advance	15
Bob Morgan (diver)	10 m platform	384.09	11 Q	568.59	5

Women

Athlete	Events	Preliminary		Final	
Athlete	Events	Points	Rank	Points	Rank
Naomi Bishop	3 m individual springboard	261.81	19	Did not advance	19
Hayley Allen	10 m platform	292.77	8 Q	317.85	12
Lesley Ward	10 m platform	242.16	25	Did not advance	25

== Equestrian ==
Dressage

Athlete	Horse	Event	Grand Prix		Special	
Athlete	Horse	Event	Points	Rank	Points	Rank
Emile Faurie	Virtu	Individual dressage	1513	21	Did not advance	
Laura Fry	Quarryman	Individual dressage	1486	29	Did not advance	
Carl Hester	Giorgione	Individual dressage	1523	17 Q	1254	16
Carol Parsons	Vashkar	Individual dressage	1468	33	Did not advance	
Emile Faurie; Laura Fry; Carl Hester; Carol Parsons	See above	Team dressage	4522	7	—N/a	

Eventing

Athlete	Horse	Event	Dressage	Endurance	Jumping	Total	Rank
Ian Stark	Murphy Himself	Individual eventing	44.20	36.40	DNS	—N/a	—N/a
Karen Straker	Get Smart	Individual eventing	44.60	42.80	5.00	92.40	6
Mary Thomson	King William	Individual eventing	47.20	33.20	25.00	105.40	9
Richard Walker	Jacana	Individual eventing	58.00	150.80	0.00	208.80	55
Ian Stark; Karen Straker; Mary Thomson; Richard Walker	See above	Team eventing	—N/a			406.60	6

Jumping

Athlete	Horse	Event	Qualifying		Final	
Athlete	Horse	Event	Points	Rank	Points	Rank
Tim Grubb	Denizen	Individual jumping	181.00	12 Q	DNF	—N/a
Nick Skelton	Dollar Girl	Individual jumping	56.00	70	Did not advance	
John Whitaker	Milton	Individual jumping	155.00	28 Q	19.25	14
Michael Whitaker	Monsanta	Individual jumping	143.00	37 Q	20	15
Geoff Billington; Nick Skelton; John Whitaker; Michael Whitaker	It's Otto; Show Time; Two Step; Welham	Team jumping	—N/a			7

== Fencing ==
15 fencers, 10 men and 5 women represented Great Britain in 1992.

Men

Athlete	Event	Group			Elimination			Repechage			Final		
Athlete	Event	Won	Lost	Rank	Won	Lost	Rank	Won	Lost	Rank	Won	Lost	Rank
Steven Paul	Men's épée	2	3	5	Did not advance								
Jonathan Davis	Men's foil	4	2	2 Q	1	1	10 R	0	1	—N/a	Did not advance		
Bill Gosbee	Men's foil	2	3	5 Q	2	1	15 R	0	1	—N/a	Did not advance		
Donnie McKenzie	Men's foil	2	3	6 Q	1	2	—N/a	Did not advance					
Tony Bartlett; Jonathan Davis; Bill Gosbee; Donnie McKenzie	Men's team foil	0	2	3	—N/a						Did not advance		
Gary Fletcher	Men's sabre	2	3	4 Q	0	1	—N/a	Did not advance					
Ian Williams	Men's sabre	2	3	4 Q	0	2	—N/a	Did not advance					
Kirk Zavieh	Men's sabre	2	2	4 Q	0	2	—N/a	Did not advance					
Gary Fletcher; Ian Williams; James Williams; Kirk Zavieh; Amin Zahir	Men's team sabre	0	2	3	—N/a						Did not advance		

Women

Athlete	Event	Group			Elimination			Repechage			Final		
Athlete	Event	Won	Lost	Rank	Won	Lost	Rank	Won	Lost	Rank	Won	Lost	Rank
Julia Bracewell	Women's foil	1	5	6	Did not advance								
Fiona McIntosh	Women's foil	2	3	5 Q	4	0	4 Q	—N/a			0	1	—N/a
Linda Strachan	Women's foil	1	4	6	Did not advance								
Julia Bracewell; Amanda Ferguson; Fiona McIntosh; Sarah Mawby; Linda Strachan	Women's team foil	0	2	3	—N/a						Did not advance		

== Gymnastics ==
=== Artistic ===
Men

Athlete	Event	Apparatus						Qualification		Final	
Athlete	Event	Vault (rank)	Floor (rank)	Pommel horse (rank)	Rings (rank)	Parallel bars (rank)	Horizontal bar (rank)	Total	Rank	Total	Rank
Terry Bartlett	All-around	18.600 (74T)	18.975 (47T)	16.625 (90)	18. (79)	18.650 (67T)	18.925 (53T)	110.275	82	did not advance	
Paul Bowler	All-around	18.825 (55T)	9.525 (90)	9.000 (92)	9.550 (92)	9.150 (93)	9.450 (92)	65.500	92	did not advance	
Marvin Campbell	All-around	18.450 (87T)	18.525 (77T)	17.200 (89)	18.450 (82)	17.200 (91)	17.150 (91)	106.975	88	did not advance	
David Cox	All-around	18.675 (67T)	18.550 (75T)	18.275 (84T)	17.575 (87)	17.600 (89)	18.200 (83T)	108.875	85	did not advance	
James May	All-around	19.175 (11T)	19.025 (40T)	19.025 (45T)	18.700 (59T)	18.900 (46T)	18.400 (79)	113.225	49 Q	56.350	33T
Neil Thomas	All-around	19.175 (11T)	19.350 (13T)	19.175 (32T)	19.025 (31T)	18.925 (43T)	19.025 (46T)	57.050 Q	20T	114.675	29
Terry Bartlett, Paul Bowler, Marvin Campbell, David Cox, James May, Neil Thomas	Team	n/a								558.100	12

Women

Athlete	Event	Apparatus				Qualification		Final	
Athlete	Event	Vault (rank)	Floor (rank)	Uneven Bars (rank)	Balance Beam (rank)	Total	Rank	Total	Rank
Sarah Mercer	All-around	19.449 (60)	19.125 (66)	19.237 (60)	18.574 (78)	76.385	67	did not advance	
Rowena Roberts	All-around	19.174 (85)	18.987 (74T)	18.612 (84)	18.562 (79)	75.335	85	did not advance	

=== Rhythmic ===
The women's individual all-around was the only rhythmic gymnastics event at the 1992 Olympics. Britain entered two athletes neither of whom made the final.

Athlete	Event	Qualification						Final					
Athlete	Event	Rope	Hoop	Clubs	Ball	Total	Rank	Rope	Hoop	Clubs	Ball	Total	Rank
Viva Seifert	Individual	8.950	9.150	8.650	9.025	35.775	29	did not advance					29
Deborah Southwick	Individual	9.200	8.850	9.025	9.075	36.150	22	did not advance					22

== Hockey ==
=== Men ===
Squad list	Preliminary round		Classification round	Fifth place match	
Squad list	Opposition Score	Rank	Opposition Score	Opposition Score	Rank
From: ( 1.) Sean Rowlands (gk) ( 2.) David Luckes (gk) ( 3.) Stephen Martin ( 4.) Paul Bolland ( 5.) Simon Nicklin ( 6.) Jon Potter ( 7.) Jason Laslett ( 8.) Rob Hill ( 9.) Stephen Batchelor (10.) Russell Garcia (11.) John Shaw (12.) Robert Thompson (13.) Sean Kerly (14.) Robert Clift (c) (15.) Jason Lee (16.) Donald Williams	Egypt; W 2–0	3	New Zealand; W 3–2	Spain; L 1–2	6
From: ( 1.) Sean Rowlands (gk) ( 2.) David Luckes (gk) ( 3.) Stephen Martin ( 4.) Paul Bolland ( 5.) Simon Nicklin ( 6.) Jon Potter ( 7.) Jason Laslett ( 8.) Rob Hill ( 9.) Stephen Batchelor (10.) Russell Garcia (11.) John Shaw (12.) Robert Thompson (13.) Sean Kerly (14.) Robert Clift (c) (15.) Jason Lee (16.) Donald Williams	Germany; L 0–2	3	New Zealand; W 3–2	Spain; L 1–2	6
From: ( 1.) Sean Rowlands (gk) ( 2.) David Luckes (gk) ( 3.) Stephen Martin ( 4.) Paul Bolland ( 5.) Simon Nicklin ( 6.) Jon Potter ( 7.) Jason Laslett ( 8.) Rob Hill ( 9.) Stephen Batchelor (10.) Russell Garcia (11.) John Shaw (12.) Robert Thompson (13.) Sean Kerly (14.) Robert Clift (c) (15.) Jason Lee (16.) Donald Williams	India; W 3–1	3	New Zealand; W 3–2	Spain; L 1–2	6
From: ( 1.) Sean Rowlands (gk) ( 2.) David Luckes (gk) ( 3.) Stephen Martin ( 4.) Paul Bolland ( 5.) Simon Nicklin ( 6.) Jon Potter ( 7.) Jason Laslett ( 8.) Rob Hill ( 9.) Stephen Batchelor (10.) Russell Garcia (11.) John Shaw (12.) Robert Thompson (13.) Sean Kerly (14.) Robert Clift (c) (15.) Jason Lee (16.) Donald Williams	Argentina; W 2–1	3	New Zealand; W 3–2	Spain; L 1–2	6
From: ( 1.) Sean Rowlands (gk) ( 2.) David Luckes (gk) ( 3.) Stephen Martin ( 4.) Paul Bolland ( 5.) Simon Nicklin ( 6.) Jon Potter ( 7.) Jason Laslett ( 8.) Rob Hill ( 9.) Stephen Batchelor (10.) Russell Garcia (11.) John Shaw (12.) Robert Thompson (13.) Sean Kerly (14.) Robert Clift (c) (15.) Jason Lee (16.) Donald Williams	Australia; L 0–6	3	New Zealand; W 3–2	Spain; L 1–2	6

- Manager: Bernie Cotton

=== Women ===
Squad list	Preliminary round		Semi-final	Bronze medal match	
Squad list	Opposition Score	Rank	Opposition Score	Opposition Score	Rank
From: ( 1.) Joanne Thompson (gk) ( 2.) Helen Morgan (gk) ( 3.) Lisa Bayliss ( 4.) Karen Brown ( 5.) Mary Nevill (c) ( 6.) Jill Atkins ( 7.) Vickey Dixon ( 8.) Wendy Fraser ( 9.) Sandy Lister (10.) Jane Sixsmith (11.) Alison Ramsay (12.) Jackie McWilliams (13.) Tammy Miller (14.) Mandy Nicholls (15.) Kathryn Johnson (16.) Susan Fraser	Netherlands; L 1–2	3	Germany; L 1–2	South Korea; W 4–3 aet	Bronze medal
From: ( 1.) Joanne Thompson (gk) ( 2.) Helen Morgan (gk) ( 3.) Lisa Bayliss ( 4.) Karen Brown ( 5.) Mary Nevill (c) ( 6.) Jill Atkins ( 7.) Vickey Dixon ( 8.) Wendy Fraser ( 9.) Sandy Lister (10.) Jane Sixsmith (11.) Alison Ramsay (12.) Jackie McWilliams (13.) Tammy Miller (14.) Mandy Nicholls (15.) Kathryn Johnson (16.) Susan Fraser	South Korea; W 3–1	3	Germany; L 1–2	South Korea; W 4–3 aet	Bronze medal
From: ( 1.) Joanne Thompson (gk) ( 2.) Helen Morgan (gk) ( 3.) Lisa Bayliss ( 4.) Karen Brown ( 5.) Mary Nevill (c) ( 6.) Jill Atkins ( 7.) Vickey Dixon ( 8.) Wendy Fraser ( 9.) Sandy Lister (10.) Jane Sixsmith (11.) Alison Ramsay (12.) Jackie McWilliams (13.) Tammy Miller (14.) Mandy Nicholls (15.) Kathryn Johnson (16.) Susan Fraser	New Zealand; W 3–2	3	Germany; L 1–2	South Korea; W 4–3 aet	Bronze medal

- Head coach: Dennis Hay

== Judo ==
Britain sent 14 judokas to Barcelona, seven men and seven women.

Men

Athlete	Event	Round of 64	Round of 32	Round of 16	Quarterfinals	Semi-finals	Final	
Athlete	Event	Opposition Result	Opposition Result	Opposition Result	Opposition Result	Opposition Result	Opposition Result	Rank
Nigel Donohue	Men's 60 kg	Bye	Sotillo (ESP); W	Battulga (MGL); L	did not advance			
Ian Freeman	Men's 65 kg	Bye	Morales (ARG); L	did not advance				
Billy Cusack	Men's 71 kg	Dahlin (SWE); W	Kahy (LIB); W	Smadja (ISR); L	did not advance			
Ryan Birch	Men's 78 kg	Bye	Laats (BEL); L	Repechage; Zsoldos (HUN); L	did not advance			
Densign White	Men's 86 kg	Bye	Souffrant (HAI); W	Yang (KOR); L	did not advance			
Ray Stevens	Men's 95 kg	Bye	Pertelson (EST); W	Ivan (ROU); W	Salgado (CUB); W	Nastula (POL); W	Kovács (HUN); L	2nd place, silver medalist(s)
Elvis Gordon	Men's +95 kg	N/A	Douillet (FRA); L	Repechage; Stöhr (GER); W	Repechage; Pérez (ESP); L	did not advance		

Women

Athlete	Event	Round of 32	Round of 16	Quarterfinals	Semi-finals	Final	
Athlete	Event	Opposition Result	Opposition Result	Opposition Result	Opposition Result	Opposition Result	Rank
Karen Briggs	Women's 48 kg	Lastrade (CAN); W	Erdenet-Od (MGL); W	Soler (ESP); W	Tani (JPN); L	Repechage; Şenyurt (TUR); L	4
Sharon Rendle	Women's 52 kg	Karagiannopoulou (GRE); W	Wikström (SWE); W	Muñoz (ESP); L	Repechage; Mariani (ARG); W	Repechage; Gal (NED); W	3rd place, bronze medalist(s)
Nicola Fairbrother	Women's 56 kg	Bye	Eck (AUT); W	Arnaud (FRA); W	Flagothier (BEL); W	Blasco (ESP); L	2nd place, silver medalist(s)
Diane Bell	Women's 61 kg	Olechnowicz (POL); W	Profanter (AUT); W	Gu (KOR); L	Repechage; Zhang (CHN); L	did not advance	
Kate Howey	Women's 66 kg	Bye	Leng (CHN); W	Rakels (BEL); W	Revé (CUB); L	Repechage; Lecat (FRA); W	3rd place, bronze medalist(s)
Josie Horton	Women's 72 kg	Bacher (USA); W	André (BRA); W	Schüttenhelm (GER); W	Kim (KOR); L	Repechage; Meignan (FRA); L	—N/a
Sharon Lee	Women's +72 kg	Zhuang (CHN); L	Repechage; Vicent (ESP); W	Repechage; Gránitz (HUN); L	did not advance		

== Modern pentathlon ==
Three modern pentathletes represented Britain at the Games, all were men and contested both the individual and team events. Women's events in the sport were not introduced to the Olympics until Sydney in 2000.

Athlete	Event	Shoot		Fence		Swim		Ride				Run		Total points	Rank
Athlete	Event	Score	Points	W/L	Points	Time	Points	Time	Time penalties	Obstacle penalties	Points	Time	Points	Total points	Rank
Graham Brookhouse	Individual	183	1015	W32	762	3:16.1	1304	1:32.5	0	30	1070	13:28.3	1141	5292	8
Dominic Mahoney	Individual	175	895	W34	796	3:36.5	1140	1:27.7	0	60	1040	13:21.5	1162	5033	36
Richard Phelps	Individual	177	925	W42	932	3:15.3	1312	1:40.5	0	200	900	13:16.6	1177	5246	13
Graham Brookhouse, Dominic Mahoney, Richard Phelps	Team	n/a	2835	n/a	2490	n/a	3756	n/a			3010	n/a	3480	15571	6

== Rowing ==
Men

Athlete	Event	Heat		Repechage		Semi Final		Final	
Athlete	Event	Time	Rank	Time	Rank	Time	Rank	Time	Rank
Wade Hall-Craggs	single sculls	7:11.58	2 R	7:08.92	4 C/D	7:09.94	4 C	7:09.05	14
Roger Brown; Peter Haining; Mike Harris; Guy Pooley	quadruple sculls	5:57.18	5 R	6:00.52	5 C	—N/a		6:08.92	13
Matthew Pinsent; Steve Redgrave	coxless pair	6:36.53	1 Q	—N/a		6:31.13	1 A	6:27.72	1st place, gold medalist(s)
Greg Searle; Jonathon Searle; Garry Herbert	coxed pair	6:54.31	1 Q	—N/a		6:52.05	1 A	6:49.83	1st place, gold medalist(s)
Salih Hassan; Richard Stanhope; John Garrett; Gavin Stewart	coxless four	6:23.73	4 R	6:12.68	1 Q	6:02.87	4 B	6:05.00	7
Peter Mulkerrins; Simon Berrisford; Nicholas Burfitt; Terence Dillon; John Deakin	coxed four	6:27.95	3 R	6:21.19	3 B	—N/a		6:12.60	9
Martin Cross; Jim Walker; Ben Hunt-Davis; Jonny Singfield; Rupert Obholzer; Richard Phelps; Stephen Turner; Tim Foster; Adrian Ellison	eight	5:36.01	2 Q	—N/a		5:39.79	3 A	5:39.92	6

Women

Athlete	Event	Heat		Repechage		Semi Final		Final	
Athlete	Event	Time	Rank	Time	Rank	Time	Rank	Time	Rank
Patricia Reid	single sculls	8:00.64	4 R	7:59.53	2 Q	7:44.36	6 B	8:13.05	9
Annabel Eyres; Alison Gill	double sculls	7:31.85	4 R	7:20.97	1 Q	7:03.89	3 A	7:06.62	5
Joanne Turvey; Miriam Batten	coxless pair	7:44.99	2 Q	—N/a		7:22.89	2 A	7:17.28	5
Allison Barnett; Kim Thomas; Suzanne Kirk; Gillian Lindsay	coxless four	7:05.38	5 R	6:59.75	4 B	—N/a		6:49.76	8
Fiona Freckleton; Philippa Cross; Dot Blackie; Susan Smith; Kate Grose; Rachel Hirst; Kareen Marwick; Katharine Brownlow; Alison Paterson	eight	6:31.63	4 R	6:18.99	5 B	—N/a		6:29.68	7

== Sailing ==
Sailor	Event	Total	After Discard	Rank
Barrie Edginton	Men's Lechner A-390	208.0	157.0	12
Stuart Childerley	Men's Finn	87.1	68.1	4
Paul Brotherton; Andrew Hemmings	Men's 470	120.4	76.4	6
Penny Way	Women's Lechner A-390	130.4	99.4	6
Shirley Robertson	Women's Europe	95.7	73.7	9
Debbie Jarvis; Sue Carr	Women's 470	121.0	97.0	12
Adrian Stead; Peter Allam	Flying Dutchman	133.0	107.0	15
David Williams; Ian Rhodes	Tornado	119.0	90.0	10
David Howlett; Phil Lawrence	Star	138.7	105.7	15

Sailor	Event	Fleetrace			Matchrace		Semi Final	Final	Rank
Sailor	Event	Total	After Discard	Rank	Points	Rank	Opponent Result	Opponent Result	Rank
Lawrie Smith; Robert Cruickshank; Ossie Stewart	Soling	69.0	48.0	5 Q	2	4 Q	United States; L 0-2	Bronze Medal Race; Germany; W 2-1	3rd place, bronze medalist(s)

== Shooting ==
Athlete	Event	Qualifying		Semi Final		Final	
Athlete	Event	Score	Rank	Score	Rank	Score	Rank
Nigel Wallace	Men's 10 metre air rifle	579	37	—N/a		did not advance	
Adrian Breton	Men's 25 metre rapid fire pistol	571	28	did not advance			
Alister Allan	Men's 50 metre rifle prone	588	43	—N/a		did not advance	
Alister Allan	Men's 50 metre rifle three positions	1140	38	—N/a		did not advance	
David Chapman	Men's 10 metre running target	547	22	—N/a		did not advance	
Andrew Austin	Mixed skeet	146	23 Q	195	21	did not advance	
Diane Le Grelle	Mixed skeet	136	59	did not advance			
Kevin Gill	Mixed trap	141	25	—N/a		did not advance	

== Swimming ==
Men's 50 m freestyle

- Mark Foster

- Heat – 22.72
- Final – 22.52 (→ 6th place)

- Mike Fibbens

- Heat – 23.27 (→ did not advance, 19th place)

Men's 100 m freestyle

- Mike Fibbens

- Heat – 50.93 (→ did not advance, 21st place)

- Paul Howe

- Heat – 51.12 (→ did not advance, 24th place)

Men's 200 m freestyle

- Paul Palmer

- Heat – 1:49.21
- B-Final – 1:48.92 (→ 9th place)

- Paul Howe

- Heat – 1:49.86
- B-Final – 1:50.15 (→ 13th place)

Men's 400 m freestyle

- Paul Palmer

- Heat – 3:51.93
- B-Final – 3:51.60 (→ 10th place)

- Stephen Akers

- Heat – 3:58.99 (→ did not advance, 28th place)

Men's 1500 m freestyle

- Ian Wilson

- Heat – 15:15.37
- Final – 15:13.35 (→ 5th place)

- Stephen Akers

- Heat – 15:46.48 (→ did not advance, 19th place)

Men's 100 m backstroke

- Martin Harris

- Heat – 57.57 (→ did not advance, 24th place)

- Adam Ruckwood

- Heat – 57.75 (→ did not advance, 30th place)

Men's 200 m backstroke

- Adam Ruckwood

- Heat – 2:03.54 (→ did not advance, 24th place)

- Matthew O'Connor

- Heat – 2:05.94 (→ did not advance, 32nd place)

Men's 100 m breaststroke

- Nick Gillingham

- Heat – 1:01.81
- Final – 1:02.32 (→ 7th place)

- Adrian Moorhouse

- Heat – 1:02.09
- Final – 1:02.33 (→ 8th place)

Men's 200 m breaststroke

- Nick Gillingham

- Heat – 2:13.42
- Final – 2:11.29 (→ Bronze Medal)

- Jason Hender

- Heat – 2:23.10 (→ did not advance, 35th place)

Men's 100 m butterfly

- Richard Leishman

- Heat – 54.96 (→ did not advance, 19th place)

- Simon Wainwright

- Heat – 56.53 (→ did not advance, 41st place)

Men's 200 m butterfly

- Simon Wainwright

- Heat – 2:01.53 (→ did not advance, 22nd place)

Men's 200 m individual medley

- John Davey

- Heat – 2:05.07 (→ did not advance, 18th place)

- Andy Rolley

- Heat – 2:09.22 (→ did not advance, 36th place)

Men's 400 m individual medley

- Andy Rolley

- Heat – 4:32.82 (→ did not advance, 25th place)

Men's 4 × 100 m freestyle relay

- Mike Fibbens, Mark Foster, Paul Howe, and Roland Lee

- Heat – 3:21.41
- Final – 3:21.75 (→ 7th place)

Men's 4 × 200 m freestyle relay

- Paul Palmer, Steven Mellor, Stephen Akers, and Paul Howe

- Heat – 7:23.10

- Paul Palmer, Paul Howe, Stephen Akers, and Steven Mellor

- Final – 7:22.57 (→ 6th place)

Men's 4 × 100 m medley relay

- Martin Harris, Nick Gillingham, Richard Leishman, and Roland Lee

- Heat – 3:43.96 (→ did not advance, 9th place)

Women's 50 m freestyle

- Karen Pickering

- Heat – 26.78 (→ did not advance, 24th place)

- Alison Sheppard

- Heat – 26.90 (→ did not advance, 27th place)

Women's 100 m freestyle

- Karen Pickering

- Heat – 57.17 (→ did not advance, 17th place)

- Alison Sheppard

- Heat – 58.83 (→ did not advance, 31st place)

Women's 200 m freestyle

- Karen Pickering

- Heat – 2:01.09
- B-Final – 2:00.33 (→ 10th place)

Women's 400 m freestyle

- Samantha Foggo

- Heat – 4:22.26 (→ did not advance, 19th place)

- Elizabeth Arnold

- Heat – 4:25.55 (→ did not advance, 25th place)

Women's 800 m freestyle

- Samantha Foggo

- Heat – 8:50.17 (→ did not advance, 13th place)

- Elizabeth Arnold

- Heat – 8:56.04 (→ did not advance, 17th place)

Women's 100 m backstroke

- Joanne Deakins

- Heat – 1:04.38 (→ did not advance, 19th place)

- Kathy Read

- Heat – 1:04.97 (→ did not advance, 24th place)

Women's 200 m backstroke

- Joanne Deakins

- Heat – 2:14.34
- B-Final – 2:13.91 (→ 10th place)

- Kathy Read

- Heat – 2:17.15 (→ did not advance, 21st place)

Women's 100 m breaststroke

- Susannah Brownsdon

- Heat – 1:13.24 (→ did not advance, 23rd place)

- Jaime King

- Heat – 1:13.32 (→ did not advance, 24th place)

Women's 200 m breaststroke

- Susannah Brownsdon

- Heat – 2:35.28 (→ did not advance, 21st place)

- Jaime King

- Heat – 2:44.49 (→ did not advance, 33rd place)

Women's 100 m butterfly

- Madelaine Campbell

- Heat – 1:02.43 (→ did not advance, 20th place)

- Samantha Purvis

- Heat – 1:02.94 (→ did not advance, 28th place)

Women's 200 m butterfly

- Samantha Purvis

- Heat – 2:15.04
- B-Final – 2:14.47 (→ 13th place)

- Helen Slatter

- Heat – 2:20.45 (→ did not advance, 24th place)

Women's 200 m individual medley

- Sharron Davies

- Heat – 2:19.41 (→ did not advance, 21st place)

- Helen Slatter

- Heat – 2:22.04 (→ did not advance, 26th place)

Women's 400 m individual medley

- Sharron Davies

- Heat – 4:56.44 (→ did not advance, 21st place)

- Helen Slatter

- Heat – 4:58.24 (→ did not advance, 23rd place)

Women's 4 × 100 m medley relay

- Joanne Deakins, Susannah Brownsdon, Madelaine Campbell, and Karen Pickering

- Heat – 4:16.51 (→ did not advance, 10th place)

== Synchronized swimming ==
Three synchronised swimmers represented Great Britain in 1992.

Athlete	Event	Figures		Qualifying		Final	
Athlete	Event	Score	Rank	Score	Rank	Score	Rank
Natasha Haynes	Solo	84.495	27	did not advance			
Kerry Shacklock	Solo	86.799	12 Q	178.999	7 Q	179.839	7
Laila Vakil	Solo	83.394	30	did not advance			
Kerry Shacklock; Laila Vakil	Duet	86.366	7 Q	178.246	6 Q	179.366	6

== Table tennis ==
Athlete	Event	Group Phase			Second Round	Quarter Final	Semi Final	Final
Athlete	Event	Won	Lost	Rank	Opponent Result	Opponent Result	Opponent Result	Opponent Result
Carl Prean	Men's singles	3	0	1 Q	Waldner (SWE); L 0-3	did not advance		
Matthew Syed	Men's singles	2	1	2	did not advance			
Alan Cooke; Carl Prean	Men's doubles	2	1	2	did not advance			
Alison Gordon	Women's singles	1	1	2	did not advance			
Lisa Lomas	Women's singles	1	2	3	did not advance			
Andrea Holt; Lisa Lomas	Women's doubles	1	1	2	did not advance			

== Tennis ==
Great Britain sent six tennis players, two men and four women, to Barcelona. Five competed in singles events, four of whom were knocked out in the first round. The only player to advance to the second round of the singles was Samantha Smith. Smith beat compatriot Sara Gomer in the first round before losing to Natasha Zvereva, who was representing the Unified team. Smith also took part in the women's doubles alongside Clare Wood, the pair lost in the first round to Italians Laura Garrone and Raffaella Reggi. In the men's doubles Andrew Castle and Chris Wilkinson lost their first round tie to the seventh seeds, and eventual bronze medallists, Javier Frana and Christian Miniussi of Argentina.

Men

Athlete	Event	Round of 64	Round of 32	Round of 16	Quarterfinals	Semi-finals	Finals	
Athlete	Event	Opposition Result	Opposition Result	Opposition Result	Opposition Result	Opposition Result	Opposition Result	Rank
Andrew Castle	Singles	Bruguera (ESP); L 1–6, 2–6, 3–6	did not advance					
Chris Wilkinson	Singles	El Aynaoui (MAR); L 4–6, 1–6, 5–7	did not advance					
Andrew Castle, Chris Wilkinson	Doubles	N/A	(Argentina) Frana, Minussi (ARG); L 3–6, 4–6, 6–7	did not advance				

Women

Athlete	Event	Round of 64	Round of 32	Round of 16	Quarterfinals	Semi-finals	Finals	
Athlete	Event	Opposition Result	Opposition Result	Opposition Result	Opposition Result	Opposition Result	Opposition Result	Rank
Sara Gomer	Singles	Smith (GBR); L 6–2, 3–6, 1–6	did not advance					
Monique Javer	Singles	Paulus (AUT); L 7–6, 4–6, 3–6	did not advance					
Samantha Smith	Singles	Gomer (GBR); W 2–6, 6–3, 6–1	Zvereva (EUN); L 1–6, 2–6	did not advance				
Sam Smith, Clare Wood	Doubles	N/A	(Italy) Garrone, Reggi (ITA); L 7–5, 1–6, 3–6	did not advance				

== Weightlifting ==
Six British weightlifters took part in the Games. Peter Morgan achieved the best result, a seventh-place finish in the middle-heavyweight division. Dave Morgan, who had finished fourth at the 1984 and 1988 Games, was 15th in the light-heavyweight event.

Athlete	Event	Snatch		Clean & jerk		Total (kg)	Rank
Athlete	Event	Result (kg)	Rank	Result (kg)	Rank	Total (kg)	Rank
Keith Boxall	Middle-heavyweight	145	19	177.5	18	322.5	18
Andrew Callard	Light-heavyweight	142.5	20	182.5	17T	325	20
Raymond Kopka	Heavyweight	160	17T	190	17T	350	17
Peter May	Middle-heavyweight	160	7	195	7	355	7
Dave Morgan	Light-heavyweight	160	6T	185	15T	345	15
Tony Morgan	Middleweight	137.5	23T	165	27T	302.5	26

== Wrestling ==
Britain entered a single wrestler, Calum McNeil in the men's lightweight freestyle.

Athlete	Event	Group stage Round 1	Group stage Round 2	Group stage Round 3	Group stage Round 4	Group stage Round 5	Final
Athlete	Event	Opposition Result	Opposition Result	Opposition Result	Opposition Result	Opposition Result	Opposition Result
Calum McNeil	−68 kg	Townsend Saunders (USA); 0 – 3, 0 – 5	Ibo Oziti (NGR); 0 – 3, 0 – 4	did not advance			

== See also ==
- Great Britain at the Olympics
- Great Britain at the 1992 Summer Paralympics
- 1992 Summer Olympics medal table
- List of 1992 Summer Olympics medal winners
