= Swimming at the 1996 Summer Olympics – Women's 400 metre freestyle =

Women's 400 metre freestyle at the Games of the XXVI Olympiad
- Venue: Georgia Tech Aquatic Center
- Date: 22 July 1996 (heats & finals)
- Competitors: 40 from 35 nations
- Winning time: 4:07.25 NR

Medalists
1st place, gold medalist(s)		Michelle Smith	Ireland
2nd place, silver medalist(s)		Dagmar Hase	Germany
3rd place, bronze medalist(s)		Kirsten Vlieghuis	Netherlands

The women's 400 metre freestyle event at the 1996 Summer Olympics took place on 22 July at the Georgia Tech Aquatic Center in Atlanta, United States.

== Records ==
Prior to this competition, the existing world and Olympic records were as follows.

World record	Janet Evans (USA)	4:03.85	Seoul, South Korea	22 September 1988
Olympic record	Janet Evans (USA)	4:03.85	Seoul, South Korea	22 September 1988

== Results ==
=== Heats ===
Rule: The eight fastest swimmers advance to final A (Q), while the next eight to final B (q).

Rank	Heat	Lane	Name	Nationality	Time	Notes
1	5	5	Kerstin Kielgaß	Germany	4:08.99	Q
2	5	4	Michelle Smith	Ireland	4:09.00	Q, NR
3	4	6	Kirsten Vlieghuis	Netherlands	4:11.04	Q
4	4	4	Dagmar Hase	Germany	4:11.17	Q
5	4	5	Carla Geurts	Netherlands	4:11.18	Q
6	3	4	Claudia Poll	Costa Rica	4:12.07	Q
7	4	3	Cristina Teuscher	United States	4:12.20	Q
8	5	3	Eri Yamanoi	Japan	4:13.40	Q
9	3	5	Janet Evans	United States	4:13.60	q, WD
10	3	2	Emma Johnson	Australia	4:14.13	q
11	4	7	Sarah Hardcastle	Great Britain	4:14.50	q
12	3	6	Suzu Chiba	Japan	4:16.07	q
13	5	8	Dionne Bainbridge	New Zealand	4:16.47	q
14	5	7	Carla Negrea	Romania	4:16.89	q
15	3	3	Hayley Lewis	Australia	4:17.02	q
16	3	7	Lin Chi-chan	Chinese Taipei	4:17.18	q, NR
17	5	1	Sandra Cam	Belgium	4:17.35	q
18	5	2	Irene Dalby	Norway	4:19.34	
19	4	8	Itziar Esparza	Spain	4:19.45	
20	3	8	Andrea Schwartz	Canada	4:19.46	
21	4	1	Olga Šplíchalová	Czech Republic	4:20.04	
22	2	1	Mirjana Boševska	Macedonia	4:21.27	NR
23	2	4	Nadezhda Chemezova	Russia	4:21.33	
24	1	6	Laëtitia Choux	France	4:21.39	
25	1	4	Britt Raaby	Denmark	4:21.46	
26	1	7	Ravee Intporn-Udom	Thailand	4:21.93	NR
27	3	1	Martina Moravcová	Slovakia	4:22.10	
28	2	3	Alicia Barrancos	Argentina	4:22.11	
29	5	6	Chen Yan	China	4:22.55	
30	2	8	Carolyn Adel	Suriname	4:22.66	NR
31	2	6	Jeong Eun-na	South Korea	4:23.35	
32	1	1	Martina Nemec	Austria	4:23.72	
33	2	2	Paula Harmokivi	Finland	4:23.84	
34	1	5	Antonia Machaira	Greece	4:24.05	
35	2	7	Chantal Strasser	Switzerland	4:24.49	
36	1	3	Maritza Chiaway	Peru	4:27.11	
37	2	5	Ana Alegria	Portugal	4:27.19	
38	1	2	Judit Kiss	Hungary	4:29.80	
39	1	8	Marina Zarma	Cyprus	4:32.15	
	4	2	Malin Nilsson	Sweden	DNS	

=== Finals ===
==== Final B ====
Rank	Lane	Name	Nationality	Time	Notes
9	5	Sarah Hardcastle	Great Britain	4:14.13	
10	8	Sandra Cam	Belgium	4:14.94	
11	1	Lin Chi-chan	Chinese Taipei	4:15.74	NR
12	4	Emma Johnson	Australia	4:15.79	
13	3	Suzu Chiba	Japan	4:16.60	
14	6	Dionne Bainbridge	New Zealand	4:16.79	
15	7	Hayley Lewis	Australia	4:16.92	
16	2	Carla Negrea	Romania	4:17.08	

==== Final A ====
Rank	Lane	Name	Nationality	Time	Notes
1st place, gold medalist(s)	5	Michelle Smith	Ireland	4:07.25	NR
2nd place, silver medalist(s)	6	Dagmar Hase	Germany	4:08.30	
3rd place, bronze medalist(s)	3	Kirsten Vlieghuis	Netherlands	4:08.70	NR
4	4	Kerstin Kielgaß	Germany	4:09.83	
5	7	Claudia Poll	Costa Rica	4:10.00	NR
6	2	Carla Geurts	Netherlands	4:10.06	
7	8	Eri Yamanoi	Japan	4:11.68	
8	1	Cristina Teuscher	United States	4:14.21	
