= Swimming at the 1992 Summer Olympics – Women's 200 metre freestyle =

Women's 200 metre freestyle at the Games of the XXV Olympiad
- Venue: Piscines Bernat Picornell
- Date: 27 July 1992 (heats & finals)
- Competitors: 37 from 26 nations
- Winning time: 1:57.90 AM

Medalists
1st place, gold medalist(s)		Nicole Haislett	United States
2nd place, silver medalist(s)		Franziska van Almsick	Germany
3rd place, bronze medalist(s)		Kerstin Kielgaß	Germany

The women's 200 metre freestyle event at the 1992 Summer Olympics took place on 27 July at the Piscines Bernat Picornell in Barcelona, Spain.

== Records ==
Prior to this competition, the existing world and Olympic records were as follows.

World record	Heike Friedrich (GDR)	1:57.55	East Berlin, East Germany	18 June 1986
Olympic record	Heike Friedrich (GDR)	1:57.65	Seoul, South Korea	21 September 1988

== Results ==
=== Heats ===
Rule: The eight fastest swimmers advance to final A (Q), while the next eight to final B (q).

Rank	Heat	Lane	Name	Nationality	Time	Notes
1	3	4	Franziska van Almsick	Germany	1:57.90	Q
2	5	4	Nicole Haislett	United States	1:59.33	Q
3	4	2	Luminița Dobrescu	Romania	2:00.51	Q, NR
4	3	5	Kerstin Kielgaß	Germany	2:00.55	Q
5	4	3	Lü Bin	China	2:00.56	Q
6	4	5	Catherine Plewinski	France	2:00.67	Q
6	5	7	Olga Kirichenko	Unified Team	2:00.67	Q
8	5	3	Suzu Chiba	Japan	2:00.96	Q
9	3	6	Susie O'Neill	Australia	2:01.05	q
10	3	2	Karen Pickering	Great Britain	2:01.09	q
11	4	7	Yelena Dendeberova	Unified Team	2:01.28	q
12	4	4	Jenny Thompson	United States	2:01.71	q, WD
13	5	5	Mette Jacobsen	Denmark	2:01.84	q
14	3	3	Gitta Jensen	Denmark	2:02.27	q
15	4	6	Nicole Stevenson	Australia	2:02.50	q
16	5	8	Carla Negrea	Romania	2:03.16	q
17	5	2	Yoko Koikawa	Japan	2:03.32	q, WD
18	5	1	Malin Nilsson	Sweden	2:03.44	q
19	3	8	Nikki Dryden	Canada	2:03.59	
20	3	7	Isabelle Arnould	Belgium	2:04.06	
21	5	6	Zhuang Yong	China	2:04.12	
22	2	5	Allison Higson	Canada	2:04.25	
23	4	8	Irene Dalby	Norway	2:04.28	
24	2	4	Natalia Pulido	Spain	2:04.39	
25	3	1	Sandra Cam	Belgium	2:04.72	
26	4	1	Diana van der Plaats	Netherlands	2:05.42	
27	2	3	Rita Jean Garay	Puerto Rico	2:07.08	
28	2	2	Joscelin Yeo	Singapore	2:07.09	
29	1	3	Akiko Thomson	Philippines	2:07.95	
30	1	5	Robyn Lamsam	Hong Kong	2:08.60	
31	2	2	Rania Elwani	Egypt	2:08.93	
32	1	4	María José Marenco	El Salvador	2:09.36	
33	1	6	Claudia Fortin	Honduras	2:12.24	
34	1	7	Sharon Pickering	Fiji	2:12.43	
35	2	1	Corinne Leclair	Mauritius	2:12.55	
36	2	7	May Ooi	Singapore	2:13.20	
37	1	2	Paola Peñarrieta	Bolivia	2:15.74	

=== Finals ===
==== Final B ====
Rank	Lane	Name	Nationality	Time	Notes
9	3	Yelena Dendeberova	Unified Team	2:00.09	
10	5	Karen Pickering	Great Britain	2:00.33	NR
11	4	Susie O'Neill	Australia	2:00.89	
12	8	Malin Nilsson	Sweden	2:02.02	NR
13	6	Mette Jacobsen	Denmark	2:02.14	
14	2	Gitta Jensen	Denmark	2:02.32	
15	1	Carla Negrea	Romania	2:02.96	
16	7	Nicole Stevenson	Australia	2:04.21	

==== Final A ====
Rank	Lane	Name	Nationality	Time	Notes
1st place, gold medalist(s)	5	Nicole Haislett	United States	1:57.90	AM
2nd place, silver medalist(s)	4	Franziska van Almsick	Germany	1:58.00	
3rd place, bronze medalist(s)	6	Kerstin Kielgaß	Germany	1:59.67	
4	1	Catherine Plewinski	France	1:59.88	NR
5	3	Luminița Dobrescu	Romania	2:00.48	NR
6	8	Suzu Chiba	Japan	2:00.64	NR
7	7	Olga Kirichenko	Unified Team	2:00.90	
8	2	Lü Bin	China	2:02.10	
