= Swimming at the 1996 Summer Olympics – Women's 800 metre freestyle =

Women's 800 metre freestyle at the Games of the XXVI Olympiad
- Venue: Georgia Tech Aquatic Center
- Date: 25 July 1996 (heats & final)
- Competitors: 29 from 23 nations
- Winning time: 8:27.89

Medalists
1st place, gold medalist(s)		Brooke Bennett	United States
2nd place, silver medalist(s)		Dagmar Hase	Germany
3rd place, bronze medalist(s)		Kirsten Vlieghuis	Netherlands

The women's 800 metre freestyle event at the 1996 Summer Olympics took place on 25 July at the Georgia Tech Aquatic Center in Atlanta, United States.

== Records ==
Prior to this competition, the existing world and Olympic records were as follows.

World record	Janet Evans (USA)	8:16.22	Tokyo, Japan	20 August 1989
Olympic record	Janet Evans (USA)	8:20.20	Seoul, South Korea	24 September 1988

== Results ==
=== Heats ===
Rule: The eight fastest swimmers advance to final A (Q).

Rank	Heat	Lane	Name	Nationality	Time	Notes
1	3	4	Brooke Bennett	United States	8:32.38	Q
2	3	3	Dagmar Hase	Germany	8:33.55	Q
3	3	6	Kerstin Kielgaß	Germany	8:36.33	Q
4	2	3	Sarah Hardcastle	Great Britain	8:37.54	Q
5	2	6	Irene Dalby	Norway	8:37.73	Q, NR
6	2	4	Janet Evans	United States	8:38.08	Q
7	3	5	Kirsten Vlieghuis	Netherlands	8:39.73	Q
8	2	2	Carla Geurts	Netherlands	8:39.85	Q
9	4	6	Lin Chi-chan	Chinese Taipei	8:40.31	NR
10	4	7	Eri Yamanoi	Japan	8:40.47	
11	4	5	Stacey Gartrell	Australia	8:42.39	
12	4	3	Pu Yiqi	China	8:45.32	
13	4	4	Hayley Lewis	Australia	8:45.79	
14	3	7	Nikki Dryden	Canada	8:47.19	
15	3	2	Olga Šplíchalová	Czech Republic	8:47.68	
16	2	1	Sandra Cam	Belgium	8:48.33	
17	4	1	Alicia Barrancos	Argentina	8:48.54	
18	2	7	Itziar Esparza	Spain	8:50.22	
19	3	1	Stephanie Richardson	Canada	8:52.61	
20	4	8	Carla Negrea	Romania	8:54.19	
21	4	2	Aiko Miyake	Japan	8:55.77	
22	3	8	Mirjana Boševska	Macedonia	8:57.52	NR
23	1	5	Ravee Intporn-Udom	Thailand	9:01.14	NR
24	1	4	Suh Hyun-soo	South Korea	9:03.22	
25	2	8	Rita Kovács	Hungary	9:06.97	
26	1	6	Maritza Chiaway	Peru	9:09.12	
27	1	3	Olga Korotayeva	Kyrgyzstan	9:21.20	
28	1	2	Daniela Menegon	Swaziland	10:12.46	
	2	5	Chen Yan	China	DNS	

=== Final ===
Rank	Lane	Name	Nationality	Time	Notes
1st place, gold medalist(s)	4	Brooke Bennett	United States	8:27.89	
2nd place, silver medalist(s)	5	Dagmar Hase	Germany	8:29.91	
3rd place, bronze medalist(s)	1	Kirsten Vlieghuis	Netherlands	8:30.84	NR
4	3	Kerstin Kielgaß	Germany	8:31.06	
5	2	Irene Dalby	Norway	8:38.34	
6	7	Janet Evans	United States	8:38.91	
7	8	Carla Geurts	Netherlands	8:40.43	
8	6	Sarah Hardcastle	Great Britain	8:41.75	
