= Yōko Kondō =

Yōko Kondō may refer to:

- Yōko Kondō (ice hockey player) (born 1979), Japanese ice hockey player
- Yōko Kondō (manga artist) (born 1957), Japanese manga artist

== See also ==
- Yoko Kando (born 1974), Japanese swimmer
