= Menegon =

Menegon is an Italian surname. Notable people with the surname include:

- Andrea Menegon (born 1988), Italian footballer
- Daniela Menegon (born 1977), Swazi swimmer
- Gabriel Menegon (born 2008), Brazilian footballer
- Lyndon Menegon (born 1948), Australian cricketer
- Michele Menegon (fl. 2025), Italian herpetologist
