= Maritza Chiaway =

Peruvian swimmer

Personal information
- Born: 25 February 1975 (age 50)

Sport
- Sport: Swimming

Maritza Chiaway (born 25 February 1975) is a Peruvian swimmer. She competed in the women's 200 metre freestyle, 400 metre freestyle and 800 metre freestyle events at the 1996 Summer Olympics held in Atlanta, Georgia, United States.
