= Lise Mackie =

Australian swimmer

Personal information
- Full name: Lise Maree Mackie
- National team: Australia
- Born: August 10, 1975 (age 51) Te Kūiti, New Zealand

Sport
- Sport: Swimming
- Strokes: Freestyle
- College team: University of Nevada, Reno
Medal record
Women's swimming
Representing Australia
Olympic Games
Bronze medal – third place	1996 Atlanta	4×200 m freestyle
World Championships (SC)
Bronze medal – third place	1997 Gothenburg	4×200 m freestyle
Pan Pacific Championships
Silver medal – second place	1991 Edmonton	4×100 m medley
Bronze medal – third place	1991 Edmonton	4×100 m freestyle

Lise Maree Mackie (born 10 August 1975) is an Australian former freestyle swimmer of the 1990s, who won a bronze medal in the 4×200-metre freestyle relay at the 1996 Summer Olympics competing for Australia. She also competed in the 1992 Summer Olympics in Barcelona, Spain. She attended college at the University of Nevada, Reno in the United States. She holds several school records for swimming and was inducted into the university's athletic hall of fame in 2009. She was an Australian Institute of Sport scholarship holder.

Mackie had an unsuccessful debut in 1992 at the Barcelona games, where the team finished ninth in the 4×100-metre freestyle relay, missing the final. At the 1996 Summer Olympics in Atlanta, Mackie swam in the heats of the 4×200-metre freestyle relay, before being replaced in the finals as Susie O'Neill, Nicole Stevenson, Emma Johnson and Julia Greville trailed the United States and Germany, to claim bronze. Mackie was also a member of the 4×100-metre freestyle relay team which finished 6th.

== See also ==
- List of Olympic medalists in swimming (women)
