= Olga Korotayeva =

Kyrgyzstani swimmer

Personal information
- Born: 3 April 1980 (age 46)

Sport
- Sport: Swimming

Olga Korotayeva (born 3 April 1980) is a Kyrgyzstani freestyle swimmer. She competed in the women's 800 metre freestyle and women's 4 × 200 metre freestyle relay events at the 1996 Summer Olympics held in Atlanta, Georgia, United States.
