= Carla Negrea =

Romanian swimmer

Clara Negrea
Personal information
- National team: Romania
- Born: 25 January 1974 (age 52) Reșița, Romania

Sport
- Sport: Swimming
- Strokes: Freestyle

Clara Troner (née Negrea, born 25 January 1974) is a swimmer who represented Romania at the 1992 Summer Olympics and the 1996 Summer Olympics.

Negrea was 18 years old when she competed in her first Olympic Games in 1992, she competed in four freestyle events, in the 200 metre freestyle she finished the first round in 16th place and qualified for the B Final where she finished 7th, 15th overall, in the 400 metre freestyle she again qualified for the B Final and finished 13th overall, after a days rest she was back in the pool in the 800 metre contest, she didn't reach the final and finished in 11th place, her final event in these Games was the 4 × 100 metre freestyle relay and her team finished in 12th place out the 13 competing.

Negrea was back on the Olympic scene when she competed in three events at the 1996 Summer Olympics, in the 400 metre freestyle she again reached the B Final and finished in 16th place, in her other individual event the 800 metre she finished in 20th place, it was the first time the 4 × 200 metre freestyle relay had been in the Olympic program and in the heat the Romanian team finished fifth to qualify for the final, although they swam faster in the final and breaking the National Record again they could only finish in 7th place.

In 2009 she became the first Romanian to win a medal in a swimming Masters event, two years later she left Romania and moved to Norway where she coaches swimming, she returned to her hometown Reșița in 2013 to be awarded an Honorary Citizenship.
