= 1991 Pan Pacific Swimming Championships =

International swimming competition

- Host city: Edmonton, Alberta, Canada
- Date: August 22–25, 1991
- Venue: Kinsmen Sports Center

The fourth edition of the Pan Pacific Swimming Championships, a long course (50 m) event, was held in 1991 in Edmonton, Alberta, in the Kinsmen Sports Center from August 22–25.

== Results ==
=== Men's events ===
Event	Gold		Silver		Bronze	
50 m freestyle	Tom Jager (USA)	22.21	Matt Biondi (USA)	22.30	Darren Lange (AUS)	23.00
100 m freestyle	Matt Biondi (USA)	49.72	Chris Fydler (AUS)	50.21	Shaun Jordan (USA)	50.38
200 m freestyle	Ian Brown (AUS)	1:49.48	Joe Hudepohl (USA)	1:49.63	Darren Ward (CAN)	1:50.89
400 m freestyle	Kieren Perkins (AUS)	3:50.08	Ian Brown (AUS)	3:50.74	Dan Jorgensen (USA)	3:54.13
800 m freestyle	Kieren Perkins (AUS)	7:50.68	Kurt Eldridge (AUS)	8:04.02	Matt Hooper (USA)	8:04.63
1500 m freestyle	Kieren Perkins (AUS)	14:59.79	Kurt Eldridge (AUS)	15:22.87	Matt Hooper (USA)	15:26.57
100 m backstroke	Jeff Rouse (USA)	54.67	Mark Tewksbury (CAN)	55.19	Jeff Thibault (USA)	55.93
200 m backstroke	Jeff Rouse (USA)	2:00.85	Kevin Draxinger (CAN)	2:01.03	Hajime Itoi (JPN)	2:01.94
100 m breaststroke	Mike Barrowman (USA)	1:02.02	Phil Rogers (AUS)	1:02.09	Akira Hayashi (JPN)	1:02.14
200 m breaststroke	Mike Barrowman (USA)	2:11.96	Hiroshi Fujieda (JPN)	2:14.78	Eric Wunderlich (USA)	2:15.43
100 m butterfly	Matt Biondi (USA)	54.24	Marcel Gery (CAN)	54.27	Mark Henderson (USA)	54.32
200 m butterfly	Melvin Stewart (USA)	1:57.92	David Wharton (USA)	1:59.98	Keiichi Kawanaka (JPN)	2:00.99
200 m individual medley	Gary Anderson (CAN)	2:02.93	Eric Namesnik (USA)	2:03.06	David Wharton (USA)	2:03.63
400 m individual medley	Eric Namesnik (USA)	4:18.40	David Wharton (USA)	4:22.92	Matthew Dunn (AUS)	4:24.06
4×100 m freestyle relay	United States; Shaun Jordan (50.78); Tom Jager (50.94); Jon Olsen (48.85); Matt Biondi (48.65)	3:19.22	Australia; Chris Fydler (50.56); Darren Lange (50.22); Andrew Baildon (50.35); Matthew Renshaw (49.99)	3:21.12	Canada; Darren Ward (51.84); Sebastien Goulet (50.73); Sandy Goss (50.65); Marcel Gery (50.49)	3:23.71
4×200 m freestyle relay	United States; Troy Dalbey (1:50.56); Dan Jorgensen (1:49.83); Joe Hudepohl (1:49.14); Jon Olsen (1:50.26)	7:19.77	Australia; Ian Brown (1:49.49); Kieren Perkins (1:50.03); Simon Upton (1:52.74); Deane Pieters (1:50.85)	7:23.11	Canada; Edward Parenti (1:52.16); Turlough O'Hare (1:51.49); Frank Samel (1:51.86); Darren Ward (1:52.84)	7:28.35
4×100 m medley relay	United States; Jeff Rouse (53.93)WR; Mike Barrowman (1:01.19); Mark Henderson (53.29); Matt Biondi (48.74)	3:37.15	Canada; Mark Tewksbury (55.20); Jonathan Cleveland (1:02.02); Marcel Gery (53.48); Sandy Goss (49.94)	3:40.64	Australia; Simon Upton (57.37); Phil Rogers (1:02.22); Jon Sieben (54.41); Chris Fydler (49.92)	3:43.92

=== Women's events ===
Event	Gold		Silver		Bronze	
50 m freestyle	Jenny Thompson (USA)	25.77	Angel Martino (USA)	25.86	Toni Jeffs (NZL)	26.21
100 m freestyle	Angel Martino (USA)	55.34	Nicole Haislett (USA)	55.63	Susie O'Neill (AUS)	56.12
200 m freestyle	Nicole Haislett (USA)	2:00.31	Janet Evans (USA)	2:00.64	Suzu Chiba (JPN)	2:00.71
400 m freestyle	Janet Evans (USA)	4:10.45	Kim Small (USA)	4:12.57	Suzu Chiba (JPN)	4:15.35
800 m freestyle	Janet Evans (USA)	8:28.69	Kim Small (USA)	8:36.30	Donna Procter (AUS)	8:39.31
1500 m freestyle	Janelle Elford (AUS)	16:26.27	Phillippa Langrell (NZL)	16:26.44	Brook Ayre (AUS)	16:40.79
100 m backstroke	Janie Wagstaff (USA)	1:01.00	Nicole Livingstone (AUS)	1:01.95	Silvia Poll (CRC)	1:02.75
200 m backstroke	Anna Simcic (NZL)	2:10.79	Nicole Livingstone (AUS)	2:11.33	Janie Wagstaff (USA)	2:11.39
100 m breaststroke	Linley Frame (AUS)	1:09.98	Samantha Riley (AUS)	1:10.05	Kelli King (USA)	1:10.68
200 m breaststroke	Kristine Quance (USA)	2:27.55	Samantha Riley (AUS)	2:32.20	Kyoko Kasuya (JPN)	2:32.53
100 m butterfly	Susie O'Neill (AUS)	59.93	Crissy Ahmann-Leighton (USA)	1:00.08	Yoko Kando (JPN)	1:00.39
200 m butterfly	Summer Sanders (USA)	2:09.84	Helen Morris (AUS)	2:10.84	Yoko Kando (JPN)	2:11.35
200 m individual medley	Summer Sanders (USA)	2:14.04	Nicole Haislett (USA)	2:16.53	Jacqueline McKenzie (AUS)	2:16.96
400 m individual medley	Summer Sanders (USA)	4:41.46	Kristine Quance (USA)	4:45.40	Lin Li (CHN)	4:48.27
4×100 m freestyle relay	United States; Angel Martino (56.09); Whitney Hedgepeth (56.53); Jenny Thompson (56.63); Nicole Haislett (54.42)	3:43.67	Japan; Ayako Nakano (56.67); Naoko Imoto (57.66); Yoko Koikawa (56.47); Suzu Chiba (56.60)	3:47.40	Australia; Nicole Livingstone (57.74); Lise Mackie (57.31); Teressa Pyke (57.99); Susie O'Neill (56.17)	3:49.21
4×200 m freestyle relay	United States; Nicole Haislett (2:00.84); Whitney Hedgepeth (2:01.08); Janet Evans (2:02.10); Sarah Anderson (1:59.68)	8:03.70	Japan; Yoko Koikawa (2:03.74); Naoko Imoto (2:03.96); Ayako Nakano (2:03.70); Suzu Chiba (2:00.80)	8:12.20	Australia; Toni Greaves (2:04.33); Nicole Dornbusch (2:04.31); Susie O'Neill (2:02.64); Nicole Livingstone (2:01.80)	8:13.08
4×100 m medley relay	United States; Janie Wagstaff (1:01.09); Kelli King (1:10.29); Crissy Ahmann-Leighton (59.59); Nicole Haislett (55.01)	4:05.98	Australia; Nicole Livingstone (1:02.30); Linley Frame (1:09.43); Susie O'Neill (59.97); Lise Mackie (57.19)	4:08.79	Japan; Eri Nakamura (1:04.70); Kyoko Kasuya (1:10.66); Yoko Kando (1:00.68); Suzu Chiba (56.67)	4:12.91

== Medal table ==
Rank	Nation	Gold	Silver	Bronze	Total
1	United States (USA)	25	13	10	48
2	Australia (AUS)	7	13	9	29
3	Canada (CAN)	1	4	3	8
4	New Zealand (NZL)	1	1	1	3
5	Japan (JPN)	0	3	9	12
6	China (CHN)	0	0	1	1
6	Costa Rica (CRC)	0	0	1	1
Totals (7 entries)		34	34	34	102
