= María José Marenco =

Salvadoran swimmer (born 1976)

Personal information
- Nationality: El Salvador
- Born: September 27, 1976 (age 48)

Sport
- Sport: Swimming
- Strokes: Freestyle

María José Marenco (born September 27, 1976) is a Salvadoran former swimmer. She represented El Salvador at the age of 15 at the 1992 Summer Olympics in Barcelona in the 200 metre freestyle, 400 metre freestyle and 800 metre freestyle competing in the heats. She also acted as the flag bearer for the El Salvador team of 4 athletes during the opening ceremony.

Marenco represented El Salvador at the Central American Games and the Central American and Caribbean Swimming Championships on a number of occasions. At the 1994 Central American Games hosted in her home country, she was considered such a good medal hope in the freestyle event the then President of El Salvador Alfredo Cristiani attended her competition.

== Record at the 1992 Olympics ==
Event	Heats		Semifinal		Final	
Event	Result	Rank	Result	Rank	Result	Rank
200 m freestyle	2:09.36	32	—		Did not advance	
400 m freestyle	4:29.32	26	—		Did not advance	
800 m freestyle	9:09.41	20	—		Did not advance	
