= Robyn Lamsam =

Hong Kong swimmer (born 1977)

Robyn Lamsam Convery
Personal information
- National team: Hong Kong
- Born: 4 August 1977 (age 49) Hong Kong

Sport
- Sport: Swimming
- Strokes: Freestyle
Medal record
Asian Games
Silver medal – second place	1994 Hiroshima	4x100 freestyle relay
Bronze medal – third place	1994 Hiroshima	50m freestyle

Robyn Claire Lamsam (Chinese: 伍劭斌; born 4 August 1977) is a swimmer who represented Hong Kong at the 1992 Summer Olympics.

Lamsam started swimming when she was seven years old at the Royal Hong Kong Jockey Club, and would go on to break 21 Hong Kong National Swimming records.

Lamsam was still just 14 years old when she competed in the 1992 Summer Olympics, she was the youngest of the 38 athletes and only female swimmer who represented Hong Kong at those Games, she competed in four swimming events, first up was the 100 metre freestyle where she swam in 59.26 seconds and finished in 37th place out of 48 swimmers. The next day she swam in the 200 metre freestyle and ended the race in 30th place out of 37, Lamsam also went on to finish in 30th place in the 400 metre freestyle, then four days before her fifteenth birthday she swam in the 50 metre freestyle and finished with a time of 27.40 seconds and ended in 36th place out of the 50 swimmers.

Lamsam competed at the 1994 Asian Games in Hiroshima and returned with a silver medal in the 4×100 metre freestyle relay and a bronze medal in the 50 metre freestyle.

In 1997 she received the Badge of Honour in recognition of her achievements and contributions to sport in Hong Kong.

Lamsam attended the University of Queensland and gained a degree in journalism and a honours degree in Asian studies, she would go on to become a freelance master of ceremonies, hosting a range of events in Hong Kong, Macau and China.

She is the great-granddaughter of Robert Kotewall and sister of former cricketer Roy Lamsam.
