= Erika Hansen =

American swimmer (born 1970)

Personal information
- Full name: Erika Marie Hansen
- National team: United States
- Born: March 8, 1970 (age 56) Bryn Mawr, Pennsylvania, U.S.
- Height: 5 ft 6 in (1.68 m)
- Weight: 130 lb (59 kg)

Sport
- Sport: Swimming
- Strokes: Butterfly, freestyle, individual medley
- College team: University of Georgia; University of Texas
Medal record
Women's swimming
Representing the United States
Pan Pacific Championships
| Gold medal – first place | 1985 Tokyo | 400 m medley |
| Silver medal – second place | 1985 Tokyo | 200 m butterfly |
| Bronze medal – third place | 1985 Tokyo | 200 m medley |

Erika Marie Hansen (born March 9, 1970) is an American former competition swimmer and Pan Pacific Championships champion who represented the United States at the 1988 Summer Olympics and 1992 Summer Olympics.

== Pan Pacifics ==
Hansen won a gold medal in the 400-meter individual medley at the 1985 Pan Pacific Swimming Championships. She also received a silver medal for her second-place finish in the 200-meter butterfly, and a bronze medal for her third-place performance in the 200-meter individual medley.

== College swimming ==
She first attended the University of Georgia, but transferred to the University of Texas and swam for the Texas Longhorns swimming and diving team.

== Olympics ==
At the 1988 Olympics in Seoul, South Korea, she competed in the B Final of the women's 400-meter individual medley and finished in eleventh place overall with a time of 4:51.03. Four years later at the 1992 Olympics in Barcelona, Spain, she swam in the event final of the women's 400-meter freestyle and finished in fourth place with a time of 4:11.50. Hansen advanced to the final of the women's 800-meter freestyle, and recorded a time of 8:39.25 in a seventh-place performance. She also competed in the B Final of the women's 400-meter individual medley and finished tenth overall with a time of 4:48.37.

== Coaching ==
Hansen has served as an assistant coach for the Florida Gators, USC Trojans, Maryland Terrapins, and UCLA Bruins women's swimming teams.

== See also ==
- List of University of Texas at Austin alumni
