= Seo Hyeon-su =

South Korean swimmer

Suh Hyunsoo
Personal information
- Born: 2 June 1978 (age 48)

Sport
- Sport: Swimming
- Strokes: freestyle

Seo Hyeon-su (born 2 June 1978) is a South Korean swimmer. She competed in the women's 800 metre freestyle event at the 1996 Summer Olympics.
