= Swimming at the 1993 Summer Universiade =

Swimming at the XVII Summer Universiade
- Venues: Burt Flickinger Center
- Dates: 9 July 1993 – 14 July 1993

The swimming competition at the 1993 Summer Universiade took place in Buffalo, United States from July 9 to July 14, 1993.

== Men’s events ==
Event	Gold	Silver	Bronze
50 m freestyle	David Fox (USA)	Brian Kurza (USA)	Dean Kondziolka (CAN)
100 m freestyle	David Fox (USA)	Seth Pepper (USA)	Pavel Khnykin (UKR)
200 m freestyle	Yann deFabrique (FRA)	Rob McFarlane (CAN)	Turlough O'Hare (CAN)
400 m freestyle	Turlough O'Hare (CAN)	Yann deFabrique (FRA)	Valter Kalaus (HUN)
800 m freestyle	Turlough O'Hare (CAN)	Lars Jorgensen (USA)	Masayuki Fujimoto (JPN)
1500 m freestyle	Rob Darzynkiewicz (USA)	Marco Formentini (ITA)	Masayuki Fujimoto (JPN)
100 m backstroke	Rodolfo Falcón (CUB)	Tripp Schwenk (USA)	Emanuele Merisi (ITA)
200 m backstroke	Rodolfo Falcón (CUB)	Emanuele Merisi (ITA)	Tripp Schwenk (USA)
100 m breaststroke	Jud Crawford (USA)	Akira Hayashi (JPN)	Mario González (CUB)
200 m breaststroke	Mario González (CUB)	Jean-Lionel Rey (FRA)	Akira Hayashi (JPN)
100 m butterfly	Martin Roberts (AUS)	Mitsuharu Takane (JPN)	Oliver Lampe (GER)
200 m butterfly	Martin Roberts (AUS)	Oliver Lampe (GER)	Mitsuharu Takane (JPN)
200 m individual medley	Fraser Walker (GBR)	Vyacheslav Valdayev (UKR)	Jonathan Jennings (USA)
400 m individual medley	Iian Mull (USA)	Vyacheslav Valdayev (UKR)	Tatsuya Kinugasa (JPN)
4×100 m freestyle relay	United States (USA)	Germany (GER)	Poland (POL)
4×200 m freestyle relay	United States (USA)	France (FRA)	Germany (GER)
4×100 m medley relay	United States (USA)	Germany (GER)	Japan (JPN)

== Women’s events ==
Event	Gold	Silver	Bronze
50 m freestyle	Le Jingyi (CHN)	Ye Beibei (CHN)	Richelle DePold (USA)
100 m freestyle	Le Jingyi (CHN)	Patricia Levesque (CAN)	Ayako Nakano (JPN)
200 m freestyle	Heike Lünenschloss (GER)	Whitney Hedgepeth (USA)	Claire Huddart (GBR)
400 m freestyle	Sandra Cam (BEL)	Heike Lünenschloss (GER)	Isabelle Arnould (BEL)
800 m freestyle	Christine Stephenson (USA)	Sandra Cam (BEL)	Marie-Pierre Wirth (FRA)
1500 m freestyle	Christine Stephenson (USA)	Isabelle Arnould (BEL)	Marie-Pierre Wirth (FRA)
100 m backstroke	Barbara Bedford (USA)	Yoko Koikawa (JPN)	Alecia Humphrey (USA)
200 m backstroke	Whitney Hedgepeth (USA)	Alecia Humphrey (USA)	Yoko Koikawa (JPN)
100 m breaststroke	Guylaine Cloutier (CAN)	Svitlana Bondarenko (UKR)	Yelena Rudkovskaya (BLR)
200 m breaststroke	Svitlana Bondarenko (UKR)	Yoshie Nishioka (JPN)	Guylaine Cloutier (CAN)
100 m butterfly	Yoko Kando (JPN)	Kristie Krueger (USA)	Debbie Gaudin (CAN)
200 m butterfly	Yoko Kando (JPN)	Paige Wilson (USA)	Kirsten Silvester (NED)
200 m individual medley	Marianne Limpert (CAN)	Nancy Sweetnam (CAN)	Whitney Hedgepeth (USA)
400 m individual medley	Nancy Sweetnam (CAN)	Hana Černá (CZE)	Hideko Hiranaka (JPN)
4×100 m freestyle relay	United States (USA)	Canada (CAN)	Germany (GER)
4×200 m freestyle relay	Canada (CAN)	Great Britain (GBR)	France (FRA)
4×100 m medley relay	United States (USA)	Japan (JPN)	Canada (CAN)

== Medal table ==
Rank	Nation	Gold	Silver	Bronze	Total
1	United States (USA)	14	8	5	27
2	Canada (CAN)	6	4	5	15
3	Cuba (CUB)	3	0	1	4
4	Japan (JPN)	2	5	9	16
5	China (CHN)	2	1	0	3
6	Australia (AUS)	2	0	0	2
7	Germany (GER)	1	4	3	8
8	France (FRA)	1	3	3	7
9	Ukraine (UKR)	1	3	1	5
10	Belgium (BEL)	1	2	1	4
11	Great Britain (GBR)	1	1	1	3
12	Italy (ITA)	0	2	1	3
13	Czech Republic (CZE)	0	1	0	1
14	Belarus (BLR)	0	0	1	1
14	Hungary (HUN)	0	0	1	1
14	Netherlands (NED)	0	0	1	1
14	Poland (POL)	0	0	1	1
Totals (17 entries)		34	34	34	102
