= Lesley Ward (diver) =

British diver & Business woman

Lesley Ward (Tomlinson)
Personal information
- Nickname: Wardy
- Nationality: England
- Born: 18 July 1970 (age 54); Bedford
- Education: John Bunyan Upper School
- Occupation: Business woman
- Years active: 1981-2000
- Employer: Brampton elm Heritage & Lime Co Ltd (LimeCo)
- Height: 155 cm (5 ft 1 in)
- Spouse: Peter Tomlinson 2021-Present

Sport
- Sport: 1m and 3m Spring board 10m Platform Diver

Lesley Dawn Ward (Tomlinson) (born 1970), is a female former diver who competed for Great Britain and England.

== Diving career ==
Ward represented Great Britain in three Olympic Games; at the Barcelona 1992 Summer Olympics, Atlanta 1996 Summer Olympics and the Sydney 2000 Summer Olympics.

Ward won her first National title at the age of 11 at Brighton and continued on to win no fewer than 60 British titles over a career that spanned 23 years competing over 1m 3m and synchro becoming a 10m high board specialist and former record holder.

She represented England in the 10 metres platform, at the 1990 Commonwealth Games in Auckland, New Zealand. Two more appearances ensued in the 1990 Commonwealth Games and the 1998 Commonwealth Games. She was a member of the Highgate Diving Club. and City of Sheffield Diving Club
