= Andy Rolley =

British swimmer

Personal information
- Nationality: English
- Born: 10 December 1969 (age 56) Lichfield, Staffordshire, England

Sport
- Club: Portsmouth Northsea

Andrew Ian Rolley (born 1969) is a male former swimmer who competed for Great Britain and England.

== Swimming career ==
Rolley represented Great Britain in the 1992 Summer Olympics.

Rolley became a National champion after winning the 1991 ASA National British Championships in the 400 metres medley. He represented England in the 400 metres individual medley, at the 1990 Commonwealth Games in Auckland, New Zealand.

== Personal life ==
His older brother Duncan Rolley was also an international swimmer and competed in the 1986 Commonwealth Games.
