= Helen Morgan (field hockey) =

British field hockey player (1966–2020)

Personal information
- Full name: Helen Jane Morgan
- Born: 20 July 1966 Porthcawl, Bridgend, Wales
- Died: 19 November 2020 (aged 54)

Sport
- Sport: Field hockey
Medal record
Women's field hockey
Representing Great Britain
Olympic Games
Bronze medal – third place	1992 Barcelona	Team

Helen Jane Morgan (née Grandon; 20 July 1966 – 19 November 2020) was a field hockey player, who was a member of the British squad that won the bronze medal at the 1992 Summer Olympics in Barcelona.

She was educated at Porthcawl Comprehensive School, and joined Swansea hockey club at the age of thirteen.

Later in her career, she played for and captained the Wales international football team.
