= Ian Rhodes =

British sailor

Personal information
- Nationality: British
- Born: 7 July 1968 (age 56); Larkfield, England

Sport
- Sport: Sailing

Ian Rhodes (born 7 July 1968) is a British sailor. He competed at the 1992 Summer Olympics and the 1996 Summer Olympics.
