= Chris Arrowsmith =

British slalom canoeist (born 1966)

Personal information
- Born: 9 November 1966 (age 59) Royal Naval Hospital Imtarfa, [Rabat], Malta
- Height: 5 ft 7.5 in (1.715 m)
- Weight: 141 lb (64 kg)

Sport
- Country: Great Britain
- Sport: Canoeing

Achievements and titles
- Olympic finals: Barcelona 1992
- Highest world ranking: 7th in world
- Personal best: 7th at Nottingham international https://www.facebook.com/chris.arrowsmith

Christopher James Arrowsmith (born 9 November 1966 at the Royal Naval Hospital Imtarfa, Rabat, Malta) is a Great Britain Slalom Canoeist who competed from the late-1970s to the early 1990s. He finished 17th in the C-2 event at the 1992 Summer Olympics in Barcelona.

== Early life ==
Christopher currently lives in Stratford upon Avon. He was a computer technician in 1992. His 23 year old sister Christine married Paul Brain in August 1990.

Christopher, along with the rest of his family, was introduced to Canoeing at a 'Try it' session in the Dorking, Surrey Swimming Pool at the age of 9.

== Career ==
He started in competitive canoeing in June 1978, entering the Novice event at Shepperton Weir on the River Thames in Surrey.

Over the next few years along with his Stratford on Avon Kayakists (SOAK) fellow canoeists he competed in all of the canoe competition discipline's of:

Canoe Slalom in the discipline's of Kayak Singles (K1), Canadian Singles (C1) and Canadian Doubles (C2) – in the Canadian classes paddlers kneel in their boat with a small cockpit sealed with a Spraydeck. Chris's Slalom Ranking History is listed below.

(Canoe Polo) – in single Kayak (K1)

(Wild Water Racing) – in Single Kayak (K1)

(Canoe Sprint) – in single Kayak (K1)

(Marathon Canoe Racing) – in Single Kayak (K1)

Chris's Canoe Slalom history:

Canadian Doubles (C2) Ranking and Results – with Paul Brain

Year                 Division             Ranking/ Result

October 1979         Novice               First Slalom in C2 at Durngate Mill, Winchester
1979                 3                    Position 12
1980                 3                    Position 22
1981                 3                    ???
1982                 3                    Promoted to Division 2 during the season
1982                 2                    Position 13
1982                 2                    Promoted to Division 1 during the season
1983                 1                    Position 7
1984            Premier                   Position 2 (Premier Division created)
1985    World Champs, Augsberg, Germany   Position 21
1985            Premier                   Position 1 – National Champions
1986     Great Britain Slalom Team        Selected for Team in C2 Class
1986    Europa Cup, Mezzana, Italy        Position 15
1986    Pre World Champs, Bourg St Maurice, France    Position 9
1986            Premier                   Position 1 – National Champions
1987            Premier                   Position 3
1988            Premier                   Position 5
1989    World Champs, Maryland, USA       Position 16
1989            Premier                   Position 3
1990    Pre World Champs, Tacen, Yugoslavia    Position 11
1990            British Open Champions, Llangollen
1990            Premier                   Position 2
1991            Premier                   Position 1 – National Champions
1992        Olympic Games                 Selected for Great Britain Team
1992    World Cup 3, Nottingham           Position 7/18
1992    World Cup 4, Merano, Italy         Position 11/17
1992    World Cup Final Ranking           Position 15/30
1992    Senior Pre World Champs, Mezzana, Italy    Position 8
1992        Olympic Games                 Position 17
1992            Premier                   Position 2   
1993            Premier                   Position 7
1993                                      Changed over to Canoe Polo Competition

Canadian Singles (C1) Ranking and Results

Year                 Division                 Ranking/ Result

1985                     1                Ranking Status
1985                     1                Position 3
1986                     1                Position 31

Kayak Singles (K1) Ranking and Results

Year                 Division                 Ranking/ Result

June 1978            Novice               First Slalom ever at Shepperton Weir on the River Thames
1979                 4                    Position 26 – Promoted to Division 3
1980                 3                    Position 146
1981                 3                    Position 41 – Promoted to Division 2
1981                 2                    Promoted to Division 1 during the season
1982                 1                    Position 13 Promoted to Premier Division
1982                 1                    Pyranha Youth Award    Highest Ranked New Youth in Div 1
1983                                      European Youth Champs Team event – 3rd – Bronze Medal
1983            Premier                   Position 37
1984            Premier                   Position 54 – Demoted to Division 1
1985                 1                    Position 29 – Promoted to Premier Division
1986            Premier                   Position 61 – Demoted to Division 1
1987                 1                    Position 23 – Promoted to Premier Division
1988            Premier                   Position 70
1989            Premier                   Position 84 – Demoted to Division 1

Canoe Polo Achievements

Date                           Achievement

1988                    Selected for Canoe Polo 1988 International Team Squad
Aug 1994                1st at Ieper, Belgium International in the Wimps 1st Team
Aug 1995                1st at Ieper, Belgium International in the Wimps 1st Team
Jun 2012                Dragons 3rd in Liverpool International Polo Tournament 
Aug 2012                Dragons 2nd in Div 2 in the GEKKO Canoe Polo International Tournament, Gent, Belgium
Jun 2013                Dragons 1st in Liverpool International Polo Tournament 
Aug 2013                Dragons 3rd in the GEKKO Canoe Polo International Tournament, Gent, Belgium
Aug 2014                Dragons 12th in the GEKKO Canoe Polo International Tournament, Gent, Belgium
Jun 2015                Dragons 1st in Liverpool International Polo Tournament
Aug 2015                Dragons 1st in the GEKKO Canoe Polo International Tournament, Gent, Belgium
Jun 2016                Dragons 1st in Liverpool International Polo Tournament
Aug 2016                Dragons 14th in the GEKKO Canoe Polo International Tournament, Gent, Belgium
Aug 2016                Dragons 4th in London International Polo Tournament 
Aug 2016                Dragons 11th in the De Paddel Canoe Polo International Tournament, Belgium

Aug 2014        Coaching  Canadian Senior Women 11th at World Championships at Thury Harcourt, France   
Aug/Sep 2016    Coaching  Canadian Senior Women 8th at World Championships at Syracuse, Italy
Dec 2016        Chairperson of Great Britain Canoe Polo 
Dec 2018        Vice Chairperson Great Britain Canoë Polo
