= Hayley Allen =

British diver

Personal information
- Full name: Hayley Jane Allen
- Nationality: British
- Born: 25 June 1975 (age 51) Pembury, England

Sport
- Country: Great Britain
- Sport: Diving

Hayley Jane Allen Sotheran (born 25 June 1975) is a British former diver. She competed at the 1992 Summer Olympics and the 1996 Summer Olympics.
