= Simon Wainwright =

British swimmer

Personal information
- Born: 13 August 1971 (age 54) Lincoln, England

Sport
- Sport: Swimming

Simon Wainwright (born 13 August 1971) is a British swimmer. He competed in two events at the 1992 Summer Olympics.

== Early life ==
His brother Tim also swam. He lived at Park Close in Sudbrooke, attending the William Farr School in the early 1980s. He was a sports colleague of Tracey Atkin, from Lincoln.

He graduated from Harvard College.
