= Elizabeth Arnold (swimmer) =

British swimmer

Personal information
- Full name: Elizabeth Emma Arnold
- National team: Great Britain
- Born: 30 March 1973 (age 53) Nottingham, England
- Height: 1.62 m (5 ft 4 in)
- Weight: 47 kg (104 lb; 7.4 st)

Sport
- Sport: Swimming
- Strokes: Freestyle
- Club: Nova Centurion

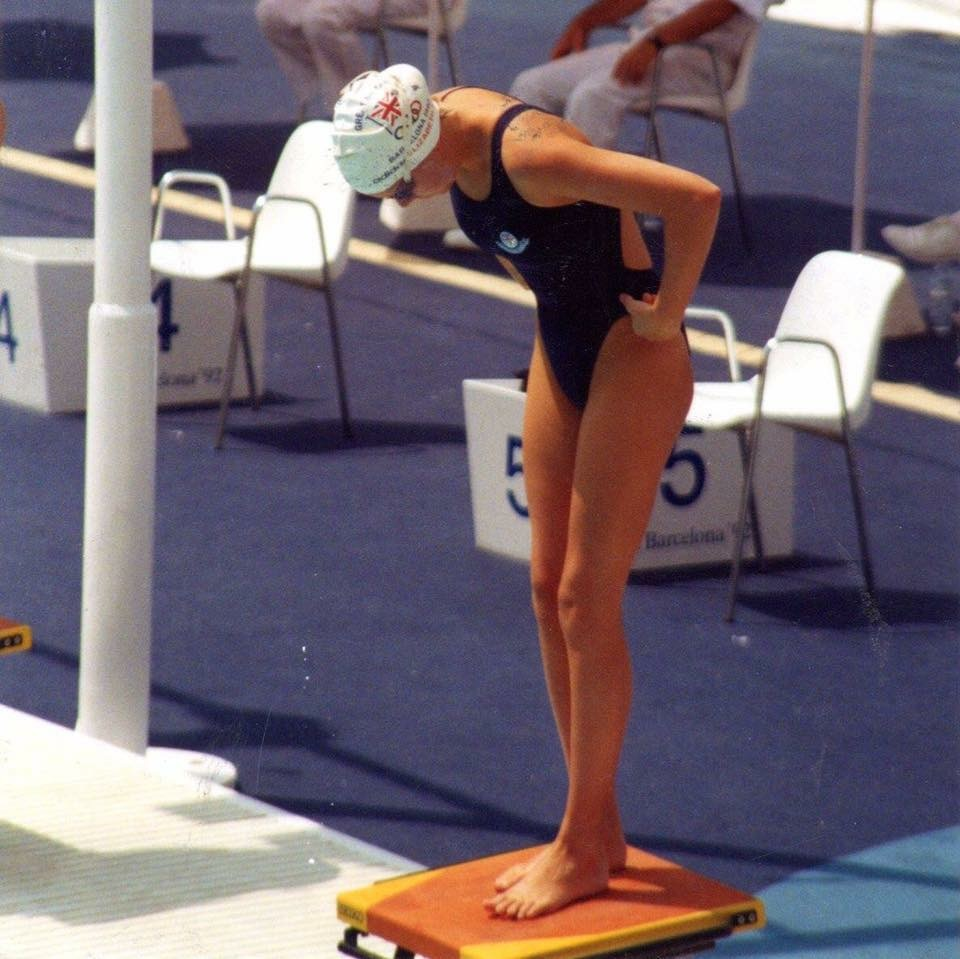
Liz Arnold GB Team 1992 Olympics 800 free

Elizabeth Emma Arnold (born 30 March 1973) is a female English former competitive swimmer.

== Swimming career ==
Arnold represented Great Britain at the 1992 Summer Olympics in Barcelona, Spain. Participating in the women's 400-metre and 800-metre freestyle events, she finished 25th and 17th, respectively. She represented England in the 400 and 800 metres freestyle, at the 1990 Commonwealth Games in Auckland, New Zealand. She won the 1992 ASA National Championship title in the 800 metres freestyle.
