= Daniela Menegon =

Swazi swimmer (born 1977)

Personal information
- Born: 19 June 1977 (age 49)

Sport
- Sport: Swimming

Daniela Menegon (born 19 June 1977) is a Swazi swimmer. She competed in the women's 800 metre freestyle event at the 1996 Summer Olympics. She was the first woman to represent Swaziland at the Olympics.
