= Lisa Bayliss =

British field hockey player

Personal information
- Full name: Lisa Jayne Bayliss
- Born: 27 November 1966 (age 59) Walsall, England

Sport
- Sport: Field hockey
Medal record
Women's field hockey
Representing Great Britain
Olympic Games
Bronze medal – third place	1992 Barcelona	Team
Representing England
European Nations Cup
Gold medal – first place	1991 Brussels	Team

Lisa Jayne Bayliss (born 27 November 1966, Walsall) is a former field hockey player, who was a member of the British squad that won the bronze medal at the 1992 Summer Olympics.
