= Yoko Kando =

Japanese swimmer (born 1974)

Personal information
- Full name: 漢人 陽子 (Kando Yōko)
- Nationality: Japan
- Born: September 26, 1974 (age 51) Hamamatsu, Shizuoka, Japan
- Height: 1.66 m (5 ft 5 in)
- Weight: 57 kg (126 lb)

Sport
- Sport: Swimming
- Strokes: Butterfly
Medal record
Women's swimming
Pan Pacific Championships
Bronze medal – third place	1991 Edmonton	100 m butterfly
Bronze medal – third place	1991 Edmonton	200 m butterfly
Bronze medal – third place	1991 Edmonton	4x100 m medley
Asian Games
Bronze medal – third place	1990 Beijing	100 m butterfly
Summer Universiade
Gold medal – first place	1993 Buffalo	100 m butterfly
Gold medal – first place	1993 Buffalo	200 m butterfly

Yoko Kando (漢人 陽子, Kando Yōko; born September 26, 1974) is a retired butterfly swimmer from Japan. She competed for her native country at the 1992 Summer Olympics in Barcelona, Spain.
