= Paul Brain =

British canoeist (born 1964)

Paul Anthony Brain born 26 June 1964 in Stratford-upon-Avon is a British Slalom Canoeist who competed from the late 1970s to the early 1990s. He finished 17th in the C-2 event at the 1992 Summer Olympics in Barcelona.

== Early life ==
Paul was introduced to Canoeing in the local Scout group in Stratford upon Avon at the age of 13.

In 1992 he was an electrician.

== Career ==
He started in competitive canoeing in June 1978, entering the Novice event at Shepperton Weir on the River Thames in Surrey. Over the next few years, along with his Stratford on Avon Kayakists (SOAK) fellow canoeists, he competed in all of the canoe competition disciplines of:

Canoe Slalom in the disciplines of Kayak Singles (K1), Canadian Singles (C1) and Canadian Doubles (C2) - in the Canadian classes paddlers kneel in their boat with a small cockpit sealed with a Spraydeck. Pauls's Slalom Ranking History is listed below.

(Canoe Polo) - in single Kayak (K1)

(Wild Water Racing) - in Single Kayak (K1)

(Marathon Canoe Racing) - in Single Kayak (K1)

Paul's Canoe Slalom history:

Canadian Doubles (C2) Ranking and Results - with Chris Arrowsmith

Year                 Division             Ranking/ Result

October 1979         Novice               First Slalom in C2 at Durngate Mill, Winchester
1979                 3                    Position 12
1980                 3                    Position 22
1981                 3                    ???
1982                 3                    Promoted to Division 2 during the season
1982                 2                    Position 13
1982                 2                    Promoted to Division 1 during the season
1983                 1                    Position 7
1984            Premier                   Position 2 (Premier Division created)
1985    World Champs, Augsberg, Germany   Position 21
1985            Premier                   Position 1 - National Champions
1986     Great Britain Slalom Team        Selected for Team in C2 Class
1986    Europa Cup, Mezzana, Italy        Position 15
1986    Pre World Champs, Bourg St Maurice, France    Position 9
1986            Premier                   Position 1 - National Champions
1987            Premier                   Position 3
1988            Premier                   Position 5
1989    World Champs, Maryland, USA       Position 16
1989            Premier                   Position 3
1990    Pre World Champs, Tacen, Yugoslavia    Position 11
1990            British Open Champions, Llangollen
1990            Premier                   Position 2
1991            Premier                   Position 1 - National Champions
1992        Olympic Games                 Selected for Great Britain Team
1992    World Cup 3, Nottingham           Position 7/18
1992    World Cup 4, Merano, Italy         Position 11/17
1992    World Cup Final Ranking           Position 15/30
1992    Senior Pre World Champs, Mezzana, Italy    Position 8
1992        Olympic Games                 Position 17
1992            Premier                   Position 2   
1993            Premier                   Position 7
1993                                      Changed over to Canoe Polo Competition

Canadian Singles (C1) Ranking and Results

Year                 Division                  Ranking/ Result
1985                     1                      Ranking Status
1985                     1                      Position 5
1986                     1                      Position 10
1987                     1                      Position 1 - Promoted to Premier Division
1988        British Open Champion, Llangollen
1988                Premier                     Position 4
1989                Premier                     Position 14

Kayak Singles (K1) Ranking and Results

Year                 Division                 Ranking/ Result
1978                   4                    	Position 179
1979                   4                    	Promoted to Division 3 during the season
1979                   3                   	Position 45 - Promoted to Division 2
1980                   3                   	Promoted to Division 2 during the season
1981                   2                    	Promoted to Division 1 during the season
1981                   1                    	Position 34
1982                   1                    	Position 7 Promoted to Premier Division
1983                Premier                	Position 38
1984                Premier                	Position 37
1985                Premier                	Position 56
1986                Premier                	Position 63 - Demoted to Division 1
1987                  1                     	Position 179 - Demoted to Division 2
1988                  2                     	Promoted to Division 1 during the season
1988                  1                     	Position 109

Canadian Doubles (C2) Ranking and Results - with Tina Brain

Canadian Doubles (C2) Ranking and Results - with Tina Brain
Year                 Division                 Ranking/ Result
1982                  Novice                    Promoted to Division 3 during the season
1982                   3                        Position 39
1983                   3                        Position 12
1984                   3                        Promoted to Division 2 during the season
1984                   2                        Position 18
1985                   2                        Promoted to Division 1 during the season
1985                   1                        Position 8
1986                   1                        Position 9
1987                   1                        Position 3
1988                   1                        Position 8
1989                   1                        Position 5

Canoe Polo Achievements

Date                           Achievement
1991		    Bere Forest Canoe Polo Team - National Pool Champions
1991		    Selected for the GB Canoe Polo Squad
1992		    Selected for Great Britain Men's Training Squad
1993                January – Played last match with Bere Forest – 4th in Division 1 League
1993                Selected for Great Britain Men's Training Squad 
1993                2nd in Belgium International in the Great Britain Canoe Polo ‘B’ Team
1993 Aug            West Midlands Regional Champions in the Wimps Canoe Polo Team
1994 Aug            1st in Men 1st Class at Ypres, Belgium International in the Wimps 1st Team
1995		    Selected for the GB Canoe Polo Squad
1995 Apr            Selected for GB Canoe Polo 'A' Team as Vice Captain
1995 Sep            1st In European Championships Rome, Italy with GB 'A' Canoe Polo Team
1995 Aug            1st in Men 1st Class at Ypres, Belgium International in the Wimps 1st Team
2010		    Coach GB Senior Ladies Team - World Champions, Milan
2011		    Coach GB Senior Ladies Team - European Champions, Madrid
2016		    Coach GB Senior Ladies Team - World Championships Syracuse -6th

== Personal life ==
Aged 26, he married 23 year old Christine, the sister of canoeist Chris Arrowsmith, in August 1990.
