= Mary Nevill (field hockey) =

British field hockey player

Personal information
- Full name: Mary Elizabeth Nevill
- Born: 12 March 1961 (age 65) Gawsworth, Cheshire, England

Sport
- Sport: Field hockey
Medal record
Women's field hockey
Representing Great Britain
Olympic Games
Bronze medal – third place	1992 Barcelona	Team
Representing England
European Nations Cup
Gold medal – first place	1991 Brussels	Team
Silver medal – second place	1987 London	Team

Mary Elizabeth Nevill OBE (born 12 March 1961 in Gawsworth, Cheshire, England) is a British former field hockey player.

== Early life ==
As Mary Cheetham, she lived in Nettleham, and attended the De Aston Grammar School, arriving from Macclesfield in 1974.

She played for Lincoln hockey club. and also threw the javelin, and jumped hurdles. She was picked for the England junior hockey team in March 1978. She played for the county hockey team as centre forward. She gained three A levels in August 1979.

== Career ==
=== Hockey ===
In October 1980, she was picked for the England U23 team. In March 1982 she was chosen to captain the England U21 team, and the England U22 team in October 1982. She was picked for the England team in February 1985, to play against Wales.

She became the England captain in July 1989.

Nevill captained the Great Britain squad that won the bronze medal at the 1992 Summer Olympics in Barcelona. She also competed at the 1988 Summer Olympics.

Nevill has played club hockey for Leicester.

=== Lecturer ===
After her international career Nevill, as a senior lecturer at the Loughborough University, researched in the area of muscle metabolism during maximum sprint and intermittent exercise with a particular interest in the aetiology of fatigue. She also stayed actively involved in the sport of field hockey, and the former Great Britain women's captain for a while was coach to the England U21 Women's Squad. Besides that, Nevill was director of Institute of Youth Sport.

Nevill is currently Professor and a former Head of Department of Sport Science in the School of Science and Technology at Nottingham Trent University, Nottingham, England.

== Personal life ==
She married on Saturday 9 July 1988.

Nevill was appointed an Officer of the Order of the British Empire (OBE) in the 2019 New Year Honours for services to Sport and Sports Science.
