= Erika González =

Mexican swimmer

Personal information
- Born: January 7, 1972 (age 54)

Sport
- Sport: Swimming

Erika González Haydee (born January 7, 1972) is a retired female freestyle swimmer from Mexico. She represented her native country at the 1992 Summer Olympics in Barcelona, Spain. Her best result there was 25th place (9:17.18) in the Women's 800m Freestyle event.
