= Jeanine Steenkamp =

South African swimmer

Personal information
- Born: 6 November 1969 (age 56) Bloemfontein, South Africa

Sport
- Sport: Swimming

Jeanine Steenkamp (born 6 November 1969) is a South African swimmer. She competed in five events at the 1992 Summer Olympics.
