= Hayley Lewis =

Australian swimmer (born 1974)

Hayley Lewis (OAM)
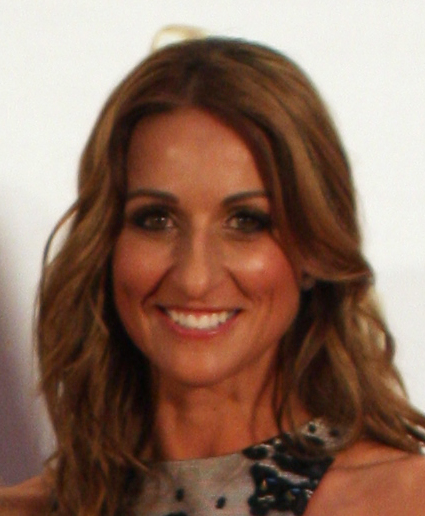
- Hayley Lewis in 2011

Personal information
- Full name: Hayley Jane Lewis
- National team: Australia
- Born: 2 March 1974 (age 52) Brisbane, Queensland, Australia
- Height: 1.71 m (5 ft 7 in)
- Weight: 64 kg (141 lb)

Sport
- Sport: Swimming
- Strokes: Freestyle, butterfly, medley
- Club: Commercial Swim Club
Medal record
Women's swimming
Representing Australia
Olympic Games
Silver medal – second place	1992 Barcelona	800 m freestyle
Bronze medal – third place	1992 Barcelona	400 m freestyle
World Championships (LC)
Gold medal – first place	1991 Perth	200 m freestyle
Silver medal – second place	1991 Perth	400 m freestyle
Silver medal – second place	1991 Perth	400 m medley
Silver medal – second place	1994 Rome	800 m freestyle
Bronze medal – third place	1991 Perth	200 m butterfly
Bronze medal – third place	2001 Fukuoka	5 km open water
Pan Pacific Championships
Gold medal – first place	1993 Kobe	1500 m freestyle
Gold medal – first place	1995 Atlanta	800 m freestyle
Silver medal – second place	1993 Kobe	800 m freestyle
Silver medal – second place	1993 Kobe	4×200 m freestyle
Silver medal – second place	1995 Atlanta	1500 m freestyle
Silver medal – second place	1995 Atlanta	4×200 m freestyle
Bronze medal – third place	1993 Kobe	400 m medley
Bronze medal – third place	1995 Atlanta	400 m freestyle
Commonwealth Games
Gold medal – first place	1990 Auckland	200 m freestyle
Gold medal – first place	1990 Auckland	400 m freestyle
Gold medal – first place	1990 Auckland	200 m butterfly
Gold medal – first place	1990 Auckland	400 m medley
Gold medal – first place	1990 Auckland	4×200 m freestyle
Gold medal – first place	1994 Victoria	400 m freestyle
Gold medal – first place	1994 Victoria	4×200 m freestyle
Silver medal – second place	1994 Victoria	800 m freestyle
Silver medal – second place	1994 Victoria	200 m butterfly
Bronze medal – third place	1990 Auckland	200 m medley
Bronze medal – third place	1994 Victoria	400 m medley

Hayley Jane Lewis, OAM (born 2 March 1974), is an Australian former competitive swimmer best known for winning five gold medals and one bronze medal at the 1990 Commonwealth Games as a 15-year-old.

Lewis is a former host of The Biggest Loser.

== Early life ==
Lewis was born in Brisbane, Queensland, Australia. She attended Brisbane State High School, graduating in 1991. During her final year, she captained the Girls Swimming Team.

== Sporting career ==
In 1990, at only 15, Hayley became a household name winning five gold medals at the Commonwealth Games. Lewis's 1990 Commonwealth Games gold medals were in the 200-metre freestyle, the 400-metre freestyle, the 200-metre butterfly, 400-metre individual medley and the 4×200-metre freestyle relay. She also won a bronze in the 200-metre individual medley.

At the 1991 World Championships in Perth she won gold in the 200-metre freestyle, silver in the 400-metre freestyle, silver in the 400-metre individual medley, and bronze in the 200-metre butterfly.

For the rest of her career, Lewis focused on the 800-metre freestyle, in which her best Olympic result was a silver medal at the 1992 Summer Olympics and a silver at the 1994 Rome World Championships. She also won a bronze medal in the 400-metre freestyle in Barcelona. At the 2001 World Aquatics Championships, Lewis won a bronze medal in the 5-kilometre open water competition. She had planned to attempt to qualify for the 10-kilometre open water event at the 2004 Summer Olympics, but this event was removed from the competition. She competed at three Olympics.

== Post swimming career ==
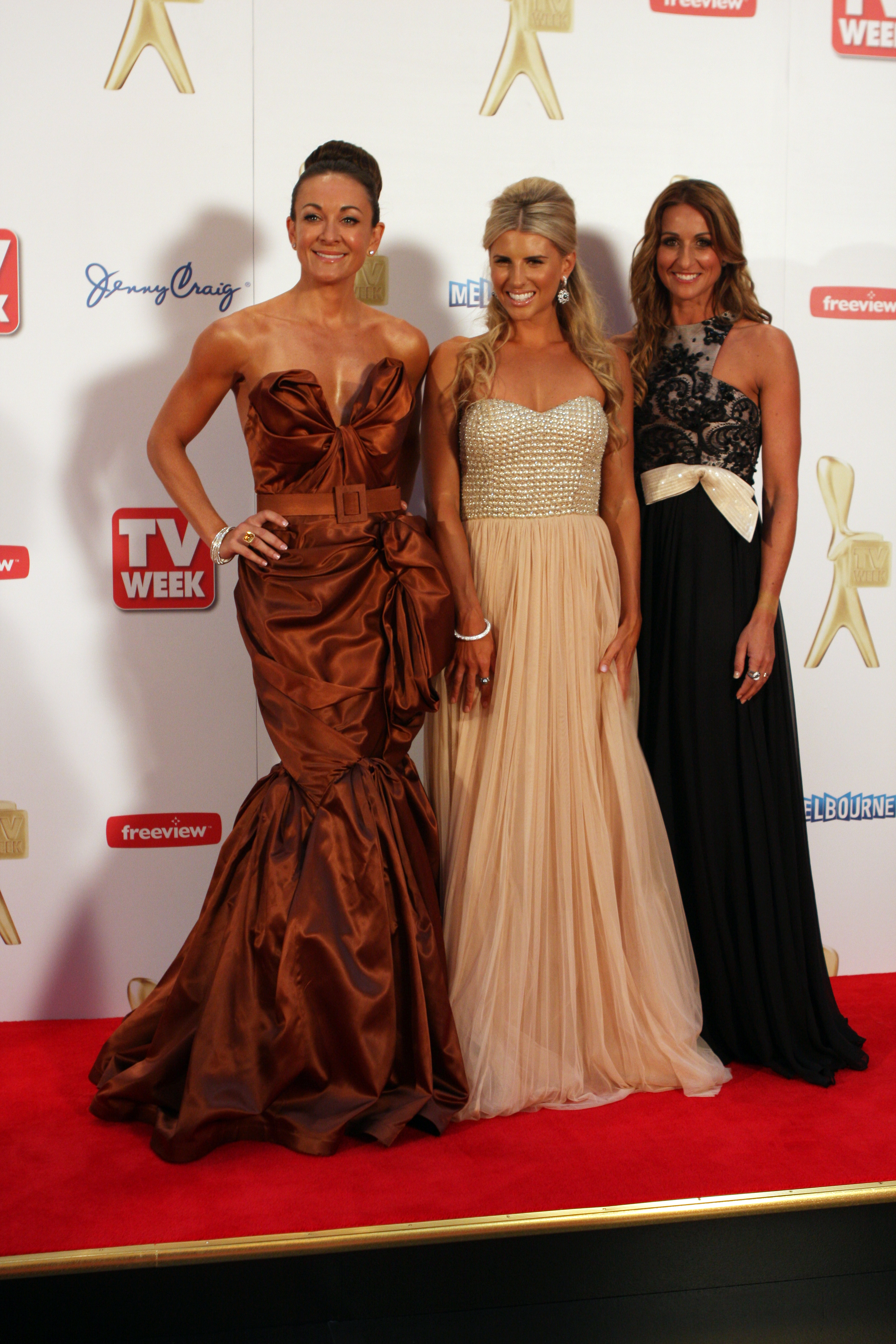
Left to right, Michelle Bridges, Tiffiny Hall and Hayley Lewis (2011)

Lewis is a previous host of the Australian version of The Biggest Loser between 2010 and 2014. She started the first swimming centre based inside a major shopping centre within Australia in 2002 at Westfield Carindale in Brisbane.

In September 2010, Westfield's redevelopment plans saw Lewis's pool demolished. She now owns a gift and homewares store in Brisbane, Coming Up Roses.

In April 2011, Random House published Hayley's first business book, Dream Believe Create. She married her childhood sweetheart, Greg Taylor, in 1997 and they have two sons, Jacob and Kai. The younger son, Kai Taylor, won a silver in the 4x100 metre freestyle relay in the 2024 Summer Olympics.

She is also a regular contributor to entertainment and lifestyle website Live4.

== Honours ==
Lewis was inducted into the Sport Australia Hall of Fame in 1997. She received an Australian Sports Medal in 2000 and a Medal of the Order of Australia in 2003.

== See also ==
- List of Olympic medalists in swimming (women)
- List of World Aquatics Championships medalists in swimming (women)
- List of Commonwealth Games medallists in swimming (women)
