= Claudia Fortin =

Honduran swimmer (born 1973)

Personal information
- Born: 25 May 1973 (age 53)

Sport
- Sport: Swimming

Claudia Fortin (born 25 May 1973) is a Honduran swimmer. She competed in six events at the 1992 Summer Olympics.
