= Judit Kiss =

Hungarian swimmer

Personal information
- Born: 27 January 1980 (age 46) Veszprém, Hungary

Sport
- Sport: Swimming

Judit Kiss (born 27 January 1980) is a Hungarian swimmer. She competed at the 1992 Summer Olympics and the 1996 Summer Olympics.
