= Suzu Chiba =

Japanese swimmer (born 1975)

Personal information
- Full name: Suzu Chiba
- Nationality: Japan
- Born: August 11, 1975 (age 51) Yokohama, Japan
- Height: 1.70 m (5 ft 7 in)
- Weight: 58 kg (128 lb)

Sport
- Sport: Swimming
- Strokes: Freestyle
Medal record
Women's swimming
Representing Japan
World Championships (LC)
Bronze medal – third place	1991 Perth	400 m freestyle
Pan Pacific Championships
Gold medal – first place	1995 Atlanta	200 m freestyle
Silver medal – second place	1991 Edmonton	4x100 m freestyle
Silver medal – second place	1991 Edmonton	4x200 m freestyle
Bronze medal – third place	1991 Edmonton	200 m freestyle
Bronze medal – third place	1991 Edmonton	400 m freestyle
Bronze medal – third place	1991 Edmonton	4x100 m medley
Bronze medal – third place	1993 Kobe	200 m freestyle
Bronze medal – third place	1993 Kobe	400 m freestyle
Bronze medal – third place	1993 Kobe	4x200 m free
Bronze medal – third place	1993 Kobe	4x100 m medley
Bronze medal – third place	1995 Atlanta	100 m freestyle
Bronze medal – third place	1995 Atlanta	4x100 m free
Bronze medal – third place	1995 Atlanta	4x100 m medley
Bronze medal – third place	1999 Sydney	4x100 m medley
Asian Games
Gold medal – first place	1994 Hiroshima	400 m freestyle
Gold medal – first place	1994 Hiroshima	4x100 m free
Silver medal – second place	1990 Beijing	200 m freestyle
Silver medal – second place	1994 Hiroshima	4x100 m medley
Bronze medal – third place	1990 Beijing	100 m freestyle
Bronze medal – third place	1990 Beijing	400 m freestyle
Bronze medal – third place	1994 Hiroshima	200 m freestyle

Suzu Chiba (千葉 すず, born August 11, 1975, in Yokohama, Kanagawa) is a former freestyle swimmer from Japan. She competed for her native country in two consequentive Summer Olympics, starting in 1992. She won the bronze medal in the 400 m Freestyle at the 1991 World Aquatics Championships in Perth, Western Australia.

She married swimmer Takashi Yamamoto in 2002. They have four children together.
