= Isabelle Arnould =

Belgian swimmer

Medal record
Women's swimming
Representing Belgium
Summer Universiade
Silver medal – second place	1993 Buffalo	1500 m freestyle
Bronze medal – third place	1993 Buffalo	400 m freestyle

Isabelle Arnould (born 6 December 1970) is a retired female freestyle and butterfly swimmer from Belgium.

Arnould was born in Liège, and represented her native country at two consecutive Summer Olympics, starting in Seoul, South Korea (1988). She is best known for winning two medals at the 1993 Summer Universiade in Buffalo, United States.
