= Malin Nilsson =

Swedish swimmer

Personal information
- Born: 20 October 1973 (age 52)
Medal record
Women's swimming
Representing Sweden
World Championships (SC)
Silver medal – second place	1997 Gothenburg	4×200 m freestyle
European Championships (LC)
Silver medal – second place	1993 Sheffield	4×100 m freestyle
Silver medal – second place	1993 Sheffield	4×200 m freestyle
Silver medal – second place	1995 Vienna	200 m freestyle

Malin Linda Maria Nilsson (born 20 October 1973 in Malmö, Skåne) is a former freestyle swimmer from Sweden, who competed for her native country at two consequentive Summer Olympics, starting in 1992. She won a total number of three silver medals at the European Swimming Championships in the 1990s.

== Clubs ==
- Malmö Kappsimningsklubb
