= Samantha Foggo =

British swimmer

Personal information
- Born: 14 September 1974 (age 51) Newcastle upon Tyne, England

Sport
- Sport: Swimming

Samantha Foggo (born 14 September 1974) is a British swimmer. She competed in two events at the 1992 Summer Olympics.
