= Itziar Esparza =

Spanish swimmer

Personal information
- Full name: Itziar Esparza Pallarés
- Born: 28 October 1974 (age 51) Lleida, Catalonia, Spain

Sport
- Sport: Swimming

Itziar Esparza Pallarés (born 28 October 1974) is a former freestyle swimmer from Spain, who competed at two consecutive Summer Olympics for her native country, starting in 1992 in Barcelona, Spain. On both occasions she did not reach the final in the 400m and 800m Freestyle.
