= Kerstin Kielgass =

German swimmer

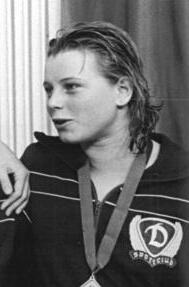
- Kielgass in 1987

Personal information
- Full name: Kerstin Kielgaß
- Nationality: East Germany (until 1990); Germany
- Born: 6 December 1969 (age 56) East Berlin, East Germany
- Height: 1.79 m (5 ft 10 in)
- Weight: 62 kg (137 lb)

Sport
- Sport: Swimming
- Strokes: Freestyle
- Club: Wasserfreunde Spandau 04
Medal record
Women's swimming
Representing Germany
Olympic Games
Silver medal – second place	1996 Atlanta	4×200 m freestyle
Bronze medal – third place	1992 Barcelona	200 m freestyle
Bronze medal – third place	1992 Barcelona	4×100 m freestyle
Bronze medal – third place	2000 Sydney	4×200 m freestyle
World Championships
Gold medal – first place	1991 Perth	4×200 m freestyle
Gold medal – first place	1998 Perth	4×200 m freestyle
Silver medal – second place	1991 Perth	4×100 m freestyle
Silver medal – second place	1994 Rome	4×200 m freestyle
Bronze medal – third place	1994 Rome	4×100 m freestyle
European Championships (LC)
Gold medal – first place	1993 Sheffield	4×100 m freestyle
Gold medal – first place	1993 Sheffield	4×200 m freestyle
Gold medal – first place	1995 Vienna	200 m freestyle
Gold medal – first place	1995 Vienna	4×100 m freestyle
Gold medal – first place	1995 Vienna	4×200 m freestyle
Gold medal – first place	1997 Seville	800 m freestyle
Gold medal – first place	1997 Seville	4×200 m freestyle
Gold medal – first place	1999 Istanbul	4×200 m freestyle
Silver medal – second place	1993 Sheffield	400 m freestyle
Silver medal – second place	1999 Istanbul	200 m freestyle
Silver medal – second place	1999 Istanbul	400 m freestyle
Bronze medal – third place	1997 Seville	400 m freestyle

Kerstin Kielgass (German spelling: Kerstin Kielgaß; born 6 December 1969) is a German former Olympic swimmer and a physiotherapist. Kielgass would win 24 medals as an international swimmer, while competing in the Olympic Games, the World Championships and the European Championships.

== Career ==
Kielgass made her international debut as a competitive swimmer age 14 at the junior European Championships in France.

Kielgass won her first major title in 1985 in the East German 4×100 m relay team at the World Championships. She also won as a member of the 4×200 m relay teams in the 1991 and 1998 World Aquatics Championships. In 1995, she won at the European Championships in the 200 m freestyle and in 1997 in the 800 m freestyle.

In the 200 m freestyle at the 1992 Summer Olympics, Kielgass won the bronze medal. In the 4×100 m freestyle relay at the 1992 Summer Olympics, she was a member of the team in the heats but did not take part in the final, in which Germany won the bronze medal. In the 4×200 m freestyle relay at the 1996 Summer Olympics, she was a member of the German team who won the silver medal, and in the 4×200 m freestyle relay in the 2000 Summer Olympics, she was a member of the German team who won the bronze medal.

Following the 2000 Summer Olympics, she announced her retirement from competitive swimming. Kielgass later trained as a physiotherapist, working for the Bayer Wuppertal volleyball team.
