= Olga Šplíchalová =

Czech swimmer (born 1975)

Personal information
- Nationality: Czech Republic
- Born: 1 September 1975 (age 50) Třebíč, Czechoslovakia
- Height: 1.79 m (5 ft 10 1/2 in)
- Weight: 75 kg (165 lb)

Sport
- Sport: Swimming
- Strokes: freestyle
- Club: TJ Znojmo
- College team: Minnesota Gophers
Medal record
European Championships (LC)
Bronze medal – third place	1993 Sheffield	800 m freestyle
Summer Universiade
Bronze medal – third place	1997 Catania	1500 m freestyle

Olga Šplíchalová (born 1 September 1975) is a Czech retired female freestyle swimmer. She twice competed for her native country at the Olympic Games: in 1992 and 1996.
