= Irene Dalby =

Norwegian swimmer (born 1971)

Personal information
- Full name: Irene Karine Dalby
- Nationality: Norwegian
- Born: 31 May 1971 (age 55) Stange, Hedmark
- Height: 1.81 m (5 ft 11 in)
- Weight: 73 kg (161 lb)

Sport
- Sport: Swimming
- Strokes: Freestyle
- Club: Hamar IL
Medal record
Women's swimming
Representing Norway
European Championships (LC)
Gold medal – first place	1991 Athens	400 m freestyle
Gold medal – first place	1991 Athens	800 m freestyle
Silver medal – second place	1993 Sheffield	800 m freestyle
Bronze medal – third place	1989 Bonn	800 m freestyle
Bronze medal – third place	1993 Sheffield	400 m freestyle
Bronze medal – third place	1995 Vienna	400 m freestyle
Bronze medal – third place	1995 Vienna	800 m freestyle

Irene Karine Dalby (born 31 May 1971 in Stange Municipality, Hedmark) is a former international swimmer from Norway, who competed in the late 1980s and early 1990s. She is a three-time Olympian for her native country.

== Honours ==
- 1986: 1 bronze medal (800 m freestyle) at the European Junior Championship
- 1989: 1 bronze medal (800 m freestyle) at the European Championships, Silver in the FINA Swimming World Cup (Distance) freestyle)
- 1991: 2 gold medal (400 m freestyle and (800 m freestyle in the European Championships
- 1993: 1 silver medal (800 m freestyle and 1 bronze medal (400 m freestyle at the European Championships
- 1995: 2 bronze medals (400 m freestyle and (800 m freestyle in the European Championships

== Personal bests ==
When Dalby retired as swimmer she sat this personal bests in short course:

- 57.13 on 100 m freestyle
- 2:00.44 on 200 m freestyle
- 4:07.88 on 400 m freestyle
- 8:26.81 on 800 m freestyle
