= Sandra Cam =

Belgian swimmer (born 1972)

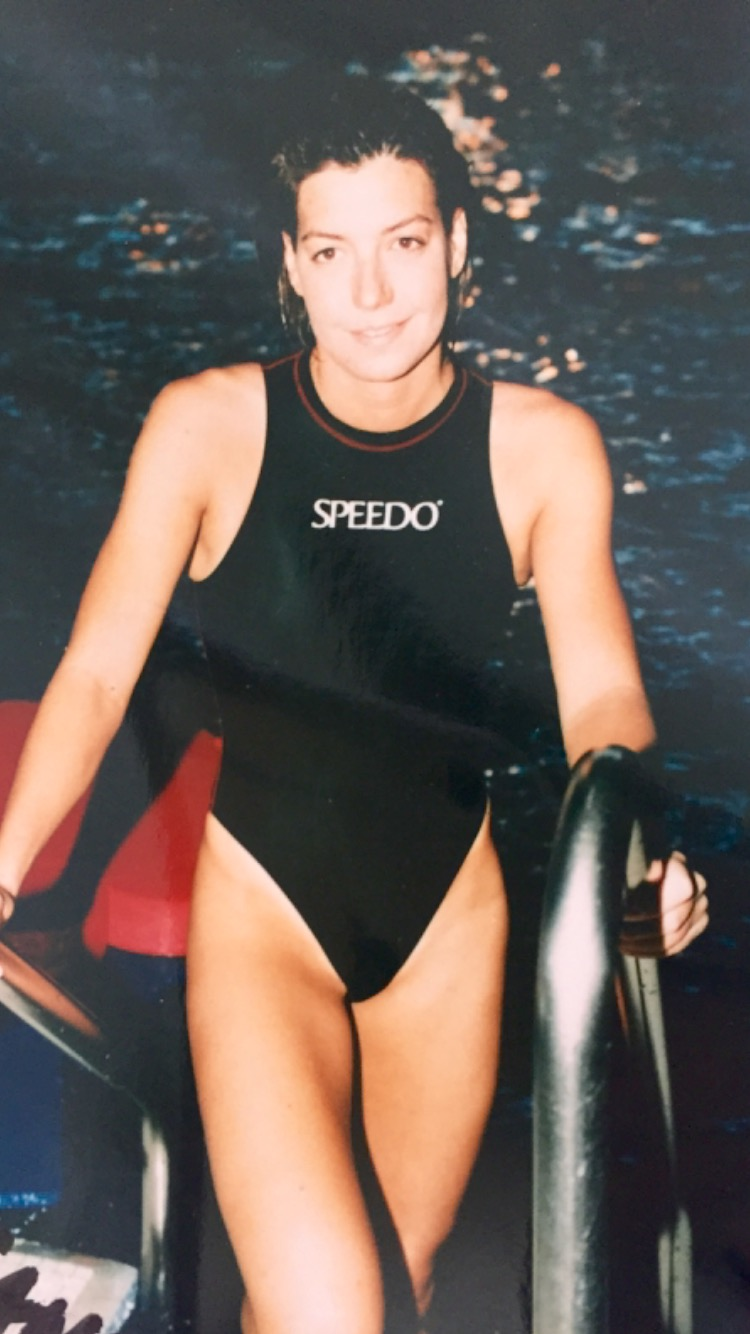
- Cam in 1992

Personal information
- Born: 30 June 1972 (age 53) Ougrée, Belgium
Medal record
Women's swimming
Representing Belgium
Summer Universiade
Gold medal – first place	1993 Buffalo	400 m freestyle
Silver medal – second place	1993 Buffalo	800 m freestyle

Sandra Cam (born 30 June 1972 in Ougrée, Liège, Belgium) is a Belgian retired freestyle swimmer who represented her country in two consecutive Summer Olympics, in Barcelona, Spain (1992) and Atlanta, United States (1996). She is best known for winning two medals at the 1993 Summer Universiade in Buffalo, United States.

Cam graduated from Southern Methodist University (SMU) in Dallas, Texas, with a BA in Public Relations and in Philosophy.

While swimming for SMU, she earned 14 All–American honors at the NCAA championships between 1992 and 1996, setting all-time SMU records in several events. She also won the award for the “Best Female Athlete” of the Southwest Conference Championship (SWC) in 1995 and 1996.

== Achievements ==
First Belgian National Championship record at age of 13 in the 200 m butterfly and First Belgian National Championship title at age 14 in the 200 m freestyle. She won over 35 Belgian National Championship titles from 1986 until her retirement in 1997.

1986: A Finalist at the Junior European Championships in Berlin, Germany

1987: A Finalist at the Junior European Championships in Rome, Italy

1989: Two times A Finalist at the Senior European Championships in Bonn, Germany, in the 400 m freestyle and 400 m Individual Medley

1990: A Finalist at the World Championships in Perth, Australia in the 400 m Freestyle

1991: Took Silver at the World Cup in Bonn, Germany in the 400 m freestyle setting her up as the third highest ranked female in the world from 07/1990 till 04/1991.

1991: Two times A finalist at the Senior European Championships in Athens, Greece in the 200 m freestyle and 400 m freestyle

1992: Took Second place in the B final of the Olympic Games in Barcelona, Spain in the 400 m freestyle

1993: Took Gold at the World University Games in Buffalo, United States in the 400 m freestyle and Silver in the 800 m freestyle

1994: Took Silver at the US Open in Michigan, United States, in the 400 m freestyle and 800 m freestyle

1995: Took Fifth place at the Senior European Championships in Vienna, Austria in the 400 m freestyle

1996: Took Fifth place at the World Championships in Rio de Janeiro, Brazil in the 800 m freestyle

1996: Took Second place in the B Final of the Olympic Games in Atlanta, United States.
