= List of Universiade medalists in swimming (women) =

This is the complete list of women's Universiade medalists in swimming from 1959 to 2019.

== Events ==
=== 50 m freestyle ===
Games	Gold		Silver		Bronze	
1987	Ann Drolsom (USA)	26.24	Marie-Thérèse Armentero (SUI)	26.56	Conny van Bentum (NED)	26.57
1991	Yang Wenyi (CHN)	25.92	Zhuang Yong (CHN)	26.10	Jenifer Boyd (USA)	26.14
1993	Le Jingyi (CHN)		Ye Beibei (CHN)		Richelle DePold (USA)	
1995	Sun Jialin (CHN)		Nicole DeMan (USA)		Marianne Muis (NED)	
1997	Katherine Taylor (USA)	26.12	Luminița Dobrescu (ROU)	26.32	Liesl Pimentel (USA)	26.37
1999	Courtney Allen (USA)		Cristina Chiuso (ITA)		Ana Belén Palomo (ESP)	
2001	Han Xue (CHN)		Olga Mukomol (UKR)		Suze Valen (NED)	
2003	Olga Mukomol (UKR)	25.57	Michelle Engelsman (AUS)	25.89	Petra Dallmann (GER)	25.93
2005	Maritza Correia (USA)	25.38	Sviatlana Khakhlova (BLR)	25.41	Sarah Wanezek (USA)	25.60
2007	Britta Steffen (GER)	24.87	Aliaksandra Herasimenia (BLR)	25.01	Alice Mills (AUS)	25.11
2009	Aliaksandra Herasimenia (BLR)	24.62	Dorothea Brandt (GER)	25.03	Michelle King (USA)	25.10
2011	Aliaksandra Herasimenia (BLR)	24.66	Darya Stepanyuk (UKR)	25.12	Cate Campbell (AUS)	25.17
2013	Aliaksandra Herasimenia (BLR)	24.48	Anna Santamans (FRA)	24.81	Megan Romano (USA)	24.98
2015	Rozaliya Nasretdinova (RUS)	24.91	Elizaveta Bazarova (RUS)	25.05	Holly Barratt (AUS)	25.08
2017	Caroline Baldwin (USA)	25.02	Maria Kameneva (RUS)	25.08	Katrina Konopka (USA)	25.21
2019	Ky-lee Perry (USA)	25.08	Jessica Felsner (GER)	25.12	Emily Barclay (GBR)	25.15
2021	Zhang Yufei (CHN)	24.29	Erin Gallagher (RSA)	25.05	Kalia Antoniou (CYP)	25.14

=== 100 m freestyle ===
Games	Gold		Silver		Bronze	
1959	N. Sacco (ITA)	1:09.7	Ludmila Kottková (TCH)	1:10.3	Koosje van Voorn (NED)	1:12.7
1961	Karin Larsson (SWE)	1:07.6	Hilda Zeier (YUG)	1:07.7	Anna Ragasová (TCH)	1:08.1
1963	Csilla Madarász (HUN)	1:04.4	Mária Frank (HUN)	1:05.3	Ursel Brunner (FRG)	1:05.8
1965	Csilla Madarász (HUN)	1:03.7	Diana Wilkinson (GBR)	1:04.0	Svetlana Babanina (URS)	1:04.3
1967	Linda Gustavson (USA)	1:00.2	Lynne Allsup (USA)	1:01.8	Michiko Kihara (JPN)	1:03.5
1970	Mirjana Šegrt (YUG)	1:00.9	Marsha McCuen (USA)	1:01.1	Laura Fritz (USA)	1:02.1
1973	Sally Tuttle (USA)	1:00.33	Jutta Weber (FRG)	1:00.59	Heidi Reineck (FRG)	1:00.82
1977	Jutta Weber (FRG)	57.80	Sue Hinderaker (USA)	58.93	Beth Harrell (USA)	59.05
1979	Tracy Caulkins (USA)	58.26	Sue Hinderaker (USA)	58.67	Annelies Maas (NED)	58.71
1981	Jill Sterkel (USA)	57.17	Barbara Major (USA)	58.28	Olga Klevakina (URS)	58.65
1983	Irina Laricheva (URS)	58.15	Annelies Kraus (NED)	58.27	Tammy Thomas (USA)	58.45
1985	Conny van Bentum (NED)	55.87	Jenna Johnson (USA)	56.29	Kathy Coffin (USA)	57.71
1987	Mitzi Kremer (USA)	57.30	Conny van Bentum (NED)	57.47	Mildred Muis (NED)	57.56
1991	Zhuang Yong (CHN)	56.28	Wang Xiaohong (CHN)	56.87	Andrea Nugent (CAN)	57.31
1993	Le Jingyi (CHN)		Patricia Levesque (CAN)		Ayako Nakano (JPN)	
1995	Martina Moravcová (SVK)		Lisa Coole (USA) Marianne Muis (NED)		No medal awarded	
1997	Martina Moravcová (SVK)	55.47	Luminița Dobrescu (ROU)	56.16	Liesl Kolbisen (USA)	56.91
1999	Ioana Diaconescu (ROU)		Cassidy Maxwell (USA)		Courtney Allen (USA)	
2001	Petra Dallmann (GER)		Han Xue (CHN)		Jennifer Crisman (USA)	
2003	Petra Dallmann (GER)	55.51	Xu Yanwei (CHN)	55.88	Tomoko Nagai (JPN)	56.11
2005	Petra Dallmann (GER)	55.35	Annika Liebs (GER)	55.97	Jana Myšková (CZE)	56.40
2007	Britta Steffen (GER)	54.36	Andrea Hupman (USA)	55.36	Alice Mills (AUS)	55.40
2009	Hannah Wilson (HKG)	54.35	Aliaksandra Herasimenia (BLR)	54.79	Miroslava Najdanovski (SRB) Madison Kennedy (USA)	54.96
2011	Tang Yi (CHN)	54.24	Darya Stepanyuk (UKR)	55.32	Megan Romano (USA)	55.38
2013	Aliaksandra Herasimenia (BLR)	53.50	Veronika Popova (RUS)	54.12	Megan Romano (USA)	54.45
2015	Shannon Vreeland (USA)	54.39	Abbey Weitzeil (USA)	54.53	Ami Matsuo (AUS)	54.94
2017	Siobhán Haughey (HKG)	54.10	Maria Kameneva (RUS)	54.37	Arina Openysheva (RUS)	54.89
2019	Gabby DeLoof (USA)	54.76	Lisa Höpink (GER)	55.04	Veronica Burchill (USA)	55.05
2021	Zhang Yufei (CHN)	53.34	Erin Gallagher (RSA)	54.39	Kalia Antoniou (CYP)	54.82

=== 200 m freestyle ===
Games	Gold		Silver		Bronze	
1979	Annelies Maas (NED)	2:04.87	Bonnie Glasgow (USA)	2:07.24	Maura Walsh (USA)	2:08.84
1981	Jill Sterkel (USA)	2:03.97	Olga Klevakina (URS)	2:04.58	Irina Laricheva (URS)	2:05.38
1983	Irina Laricheva (URS)	2:02.17	Annelies Kraus (NED)	2:02.78	Irina Gerasimova (URS)	2:02.84
1985	Conny van Bentum (NED)	2:00.34	Mary T. Meagher (USA)	2:01.64	Michelle Pearson (AUS)	2:02.25
1987	Noemi Lung (ROM)	2:00.89	Mitzi Kremer (USA)	2:01.84	Silvia Persi (ITA)	2:03.68
1991	Karen Kraemer (USA)	2:02.23	Patricia Noall (CAN)	2:02.99	Natalia Trefilova (URS)	2:03.68
1993	Heike Lünenschloss (GER)		Whitney Hedgepeth (USA)		Claire Huddart (GBR)	
1995	Lisa Jacob (USA)		Sarah Anderson (USA)		Naoko Imoto (JPN)	
1997	Martina Moravcová (SVK)	1:59.96	Kim Black (USA)	2:01.48	Luminița Dobrescu (ROU)	2:02.76
1999	Kim Black (USA)		Ioana Diaconescu (ROU)		Meike Freitag (GER)	
2001	Camelia Potec (ROU)		Nadezhda Chemezova (RUS)		Sarah Tolar (USA)	
2003	Yana Klochkova (UKR)	1:59.03	Solenne Figuès (FRA)	1:59.66	Pang Jiaying (CHN)	2:00.76
2005	Otylia Jędrzejczak (POL)	1:58.49	Annika Liebs (GER)	1:59.99	Petra Dallmann (GER)	2:00.81
2007	Federica Pellegrini (ITA)	1:57.67	Sara Isaković (SLO)	1:58.19	Kate Dwelley (USA)	1:59.35
2009	Sara Isaković (SLO)	1:58.59	Kevyn Peterson (CAN)	1:58.67	Kristen Heiss (USA)	1:58.77
2011	Melani Costa Schmid (ESP)	1:57.98	Lauren Boyle (NZL)	1:59.19	Karlee Bispo (USA)	1:59.31
2013	Viktoriya Andreyeva (RUS)	1:57.31	Veronika Popova (RUS)	1:57.40	Caitlin McClatchey (GBR)	1:58.20
2015	Shannon Vreeland (USA)	1:58.38	Wang Shijia (CHN)	1:58.89	Martina De Memme (ITA)	1:59.14
2017	Siobhán Haughey (HKG)	1:56.71	Katie Drabot (USA)	1:57.61	Arina Openysheva (RUS)	1:58.53
2019	Gabby DeLoof (USA)	1:57.62	Paige Madden (USA)	1:58.31	Mariya Baklakova (RUS)	1:59.00
2021	Liu Yaxin (CHN)	1:56.84	Giulia D'Innocenzo (ITA)	1:58.69	Océane Carnez (FRA)	1:59.73

=== 400 m freestyle ===
Games	Gold		Silver		Bronze	
1959	Ludmila Kottková (TCH)	5:33.3	Christine Gosden (GBR)	5:42.9	N. Sacco (ITA)	5:43.3
1961	Hilda Zeier (YUG)	5:14.4	Hilda-Danuta Zachariasiewicz (POL)	5:38.0	Ludmila Kottková (TCH)	5:45.1
1963	Ursel Brunner (FRG)	5:07.3	Mária Frank (HUN)	5:11.1	Hilda Zeier (YUG)	5:13.8
1965	Hilda Zeier (YUG)	5:08.9	Bep Weeteling (NED)	5:11.5	Cristina Balaban (ROM)	5:13.8
1967	Linda Gustavson (USA)	4:37.8	Lee Davis (USA)	4:43.8	Michiko Kihara (JPN)	4:55.4
1970	Evelyn Kossner (USA)	4:43.7	Kathy Thomas (USA)	4:49.9	Sandra Smith (CAN)	4:53.9
1973	Ann Simmons (USA)	4:28.80	Jill Strong (USA)	4:39.15	Nadezhda Matyukhina (URS)	4:41.56
1977	Bonnie Glasgow (USA)	4:16.50	Liz McKinnon (CAN)	4:24.04	Wendy Weinberg (USA)	4:27.75
1979	Corrina Weinkofsky (USA)	4:22.88	Bonnie Glasgow (USA)	4:25.92	Annelies Maas (NED)	4:28.03
1981	Kim Linehan (USA)	4:15.26	Irina Laricheva (URS)	4:15.50	Sherri Hanna (USA)	4:21.01
1983	Irina Laricheva (URS)	4:13.41	Marybeth Linzmeier (USA)	4:15.36	Julie Daigneault (CAN)	4:17.77
1985	Patty Sabo (USA)	4:16.23	Andrea Orosz (HUN)	4:16.88	Stacy Shupe (USA)	4:18.34
1987	Noemi Lung (ROM)	4:10.84	Mitzi Kremer (USA)	4:12.18	Lisa Meyers (USA)	4:18.86
1991	Patricia Noall (CAN)	4:16.74	Jana Shamarova (URS)	4:17.15	Sionainn Marcoux (USA)	4:18.03
1993	Sandra Cam (BEL)		Heike Lünenschloss (GER)		Isabelle Arnould (BEL)	
1995	Emily Peters (USA)		Sarah Anderson (USA)		Sachiko Miyaji (JPN)	
1997	Eri Yamanoi (JPN)	4:16.30	Sachiko Miyaji (JPN)	4:16.40	Julie Varozza (USA)	4:16.49
1999	Hana Černá (CZE)		Jana Pechanová (CZE)		Katie Zimbone (USA)	
2001	Camelia Potec (ROU)		Rachel Komisarz (USA)		Sachiko Yamada (JPN)	
2003	Rebecca Cooke (GBR)	4:11.23	Chen Hua (CHN)	4:11.94	Magda Dyszkiewicz (USA)	4:12.52
2005	Camelia Potec (ROU)	4:10.88	Rebecca Cooke (GBR)	4:12.11	Chanelle Charron-Watson (CAN)	4:13.27
2007	Federica Pellegrini (ITA)	4:06.11	Coralie Balmy (FRA)	4:10.08	Jördis Steinegger (AUT)	4:11.88
2009	Kevyn Peterson (CAN)	4:10.01	Kristen Heiss (USA)	4:11.30	Leone Vorster (RSA)	4:13.18
2011	Lauren Boyle (NZL)	4:07.78	Melani Costa Schmid (ESP)	4:07.97	Stephanie Peacock (USA)	4:10.25
2013	Martina De Memme (ITA)	4:07.69	Elena Sokolova (RUS)	4:08.51	Caitlin McClatchey (GBR)	4:08.77
2015	Leah Smith (USA)	4:05.29	Lindsay Vrooman (USA)	4:07.28	Martina De Memme (ITA)	4:08.95
2017	Sarah Köhler (GER)	4:03.96	Joanna Evans (BAH)	4:08.52	Sierra Schmidt (USA)	4:09.82
2019	Kaersten Meitz (USA)	4:05.80	Linda Caponi (ITA)	4:10.53	Sierra Schmidt (USA)	4:11.37
2021	Li Bingjie (CHN)	4:08.38	Ajna Késely (HUN)	4:09.50	Antonietta Cesarano (ITA)	4:10.49

=== 800 m freestyle ===
Games	Gold		Silver		Bronze	
1979	Margaret Brooksbank (USA)	9:04.32	Annelies Maas (NED)	9:13.62	Cyndi McCullam (USA)	9:18.28
1981	Kim Linehan (USA)	8:37.50	Irina Laricheva (URS)	8:45.01	Sherri Hanna (USA)	8:46.57
1983	Irina Laricheva (URS)	8:40.31	Marybeth Linzmeier (USA)	8:41.43	Julie Daigneault (CAN)	8:53.52
1985	Stacy Shupe (USA)	8:45.87	Carla Lasi (ITA)	8:47.76	Andrea Orosz (HUN)	8:49.41
1987	Noemi Lung (ROM)	8:34.82	Cheryl Kriegsman (USA)	8:41.18	Yan Ming (CHN)	8:46.10
1991	Francesca Ferrarini (ITA)	8:43.55	Marie-Pierre Wirth (FRA)	8:47.98	Sionainn Marcoux (USA)	8:48.53
1993	Christine Stephenson (USA)		Sandra Cam (BEL)		Marie-Pierre Wirth (FRA)	
1995	Tamako Kihara (JPN)		Julie Millis (USA)		Chloe Flutter (AUS)	
1997	Suzanne Black (USA)	8:45.82	Joy Stover (USA)	8:47.73	Eri Yamanoi (JPN)	8:48.65
1999	Cara Lane (USA)		Jana Pechanová (CZE)		Julie Varozza (USA)	
2001	Yana Klochkova (UKR)		Jana Pechanová (CZE)		Sachiko Yamada (JPN)	
2003	Rebecca Cooke (GBR)	8:33.84	Chen Hua (CHN)	8:35.70	Olga Beresnyeva (UKR)	8:36.66
2005	Rebecca Cooke (GBR)	8:31.43	Hayley Peirsol (USA)	8:32.89	Camelia Potec (ROU)	8:33.33
2007	Flavia Rigamonti (SUI)	8:25.59	Federica Pellegrini (ITA)	8:34.97	Kelsey Ditto (USA)	8:35.30
2009	Whitney Sprague (USA)	8:32.71	Yumi Kida (JPN)	8:34.98	Roberta Ioppi (ITA)	8:40.00
2011	Lauren Boyle (NZL)	8:26.30	Haley Anderson (USA)	8:27.11	Melani Costa Schmid (ESP)	8:33.66
2013	Martina De Memme (ITA)	8:28.09	Stephanie Peacock (USA)	8:28.21	Ashley Steenvoorden (USA)	8:29.79
2015	Lindsay Vrooman (USA)	8:26.67	Martina Caramignoli (ITA)	8:28.43	Kiah Melverton (AUS)	8:31.80
2017	Simona Quadarella (ITA)	8:20.54	Sarah Köhler (GER)	8:21.67	Joanna Evans (BAH)	8:31.18
2019	Waka Kobori (JPN)	8:34.30	Irina Prikhodko (RUS)	8:37.36	Chinatsu Sato (JPN)	8:38.19
2021	Li Bingjie (CHN)	8:30.74	Duné Coetzee (RSA)	8:32.88	Noemi Cesarano (ITA)	8:33.12

=== 1500 m freestyle ===
Games	Gold		Silver		Bronze	
1993	Christine Stephenson (USA)		Isabelle Arnould (BEL)		Marie-Pierre Wirth (FRA)	
1995	Tobie Smith (USA)		Julie Millis (USA)		Tamako Kihara (JPN)	
1997	Suzanne Black (USA)	16:40.30	Joy Stover (USA)	16:45.47	Olga Šplíchalová (CZE)	16:52.83
1999	Cara Lane (USA)		Julie Varozza (USA)		Hana Černá (CZE)	
2001	Sachiko Yamada (JPN)		Rachel Komisarz (USA)		Jana Pechanová (CZE)	
2003	Rebecca Cooke (GBR)	16:14.70	Adrienne Binder (USA)	16:19.32	Lauren Costella (USA)	16:24.43
2005	Hayley Peirsol (USA)	16:08.06	Rebecca Cooke (GBR)	16:22.47	Jana Pechanová (CZE)	16:37.77
2007	Flavia Rigamonti (SUI)	16:05.90	Chika Yonenaga (JPN)	16:27.86	Kelsey Ditto (USA)	16:36.31
2009	Yumi Kida (JPN)	16:24.26	Whitney Sprague (USA)	16:29.04	Natsumi Iwashita (JPN)	16:31.68
2011	Haley Anderson (USA)	16:21.72	Melani Costa Schmid (ESP)	16:21.79	Lauren Boyle (NZL)	16:26.37
2013	Stephanie Peacock (USA)	16:04.44	Ashley Steenvoorden (USA)	16:07.89	Martina Caramignoli (ITA)	16:19.71
2015	Martina Caramignoli (ITA)	16:06.71	Lindsay Vrooman (USA)	16:13.85	Kiah Melverton (AUS)	16:21.39
2017	Simona Quadarella (ITA)	15:57.90	Sarah Köhler (GER)	15:59.85	Hannah Moore (USA)	16:11.68
2019	Waka Kobori (JPN)	16:16.33	Moesha Johnson (AUS)	16:20.00	Molly Kowal (USA)	16:20.94
2021	Li Bingjie (CHN)	16:18.48	Ichika Kajimoto (JPN)	16:23.02	Noemi Cesarano (ITA)	16:23.16

=== 50 m backstroke ===
Games	Gold		Silver		Bronze	
2001	Ilona Hlaváčková (CZE)		Mai Nakamura (JPN)		Susan Woessner (USA)	
2003	Ilona Hlaváčková (CZE)	29.04	Beth Botsford (USA)	29.27	Aya Terakawa (JPN)	29.43
2005	Aya Terakawa (JPN)	29.06	Jennifer Carroll (CAN)	29.32	Sviatlana Khakhlova (BLR)	29.42
2007	Aya Terakawa (JPN)	28.61	Aliaksandra Herasimenia (BLR)	28.70	Sviatlana Khakhlova (BLR)	28.83
2009	Shiho Sakai (JPN)	28.17	Xu Tianlongzi (CHN)	28.20	Aliaksandra Herasimenia (BLR)	28.32
2011	Jenny Connolly (USA)	27.92	Aliaksandra Herasimenia (BLR)	27.93	Grace Loh (AUS)	28.37
2013	Anastasia Zueva (RUS)	27.89	Aliaksandra Herasimenia (BLR)	28.01	Madison Wilson (AUS)	28.33
2015	Holly Barratt (AUS)	28.04	Stephanie Au (HKG) Yu Hyoun-ji (KOR)	28.38	No medal awarded	
2017	Kira Toussaint (NED) Ali DeLoof (USA)	28.07	No medal awarded		Hannah Stevens (USA)	28.14
2019	Silvia Scalia (ITA)	27.92	Elise Haan (USA)	28.02	Calypso McDonnell (AUS)	28.25
2021	Adela Piskorska (POL)	27.84	Paulina Peda (POL) Anya Mostek (USA)	28.48	No medal awarded	

=== 100 m backstroke ===
Games	Gold		Silver		Bronze	
1959	Rita Androsoni (ITA)	1:20.7	Tindall (GBR)	1:28.0	Bosch (FRG)	1:28.8
1961	Larisa Viktorova (URS)	1:13.6	Magdolna Dávid (HUN)	1:16.1	Maria Both (ROM)	1:16.7
1963	Mária Balla (HUN)	1:12.7	Olga Korényi (HUN)	1:13.3	Ursel Brunner (FRG)	1:16.3
1965	Françoise Borie (FRA)	1:11.4	Bep Weeteling (NED)	1:11.5	Cristina Balaban (ROM)	1:11.8
1967	Kendis Moore (USA)	1:07.9	Françoise Borie (FRA)	1:10.3	Martha Randall (USA)	1:11.0
1970	Kaye Hall (USA)	1:07.3	Lynn Skrifvars (USA)	1:11.0	Soviet Athlete (URS)	1:11.4
1973	Mary Feldman (USA)	1:07.04	Elizabeth Tullis (USA)	1:07.38	Bénédicte Duprez (FRA)	1:09.65
1977	Klavdiya Studennikova (URS)	1:06.68	Meg McCully (USA)	1:07.25	Yelena Rusanova (URS)	1:08.54
1979	Carmen Bunaciu (ROM)	1:03.35	Margaret Browne (USA)	1:05.63	Christine Breedy (USA)	1:05.75
1981	Carmen Bunaciu (ROM)	1:02.47	Kim Carlisle (USA)	1:04.53	Susan Walsh (USA)	1:04.74
1983	Larisa Gorchakova (URS)	1:03.28	Carmen Bunaciu (ROM)	1:03.77	Susan Walsh (USA)	1:03.80
1985	Carmen Bunaciu (ROM)	1:03.67	Jolanda de Rover (NED)	1:03.75	Michelle Donahue (USA)	1:03.83
1987	Aneta Patrascoiu (ROM)	1:02.92	Susan O'Brien (USA)	1:03.77	Jolanda de Rover (NED)	1:03.92
1991	Barbara Bedford (USA)	1:02.08	Kristina Stinson (USA)	1:03.70	Niecia Freeman (AUS)	1:04.47
1993	Barbara Bedford (USA)		Yoko Koikawa (JPN)		Alecia Humphrey (USA)	
1995	Kristin Heydanek (USA)		Yoko Koikawa (JPN)		Angela Gittings (USA)	
1997	Noriko Inada (JPN)	1:02.24	Fabíola Molina (BRA)	1:03.76	Paige Francis (USA)	1:03.89
1999	Noriko Inada (JPN)		Tomoko Hagiwara (JPN)		Ilona Hlaváčková (CZE)	
2001	Mai Nakamura (JPN)		Susan Woessner (USA)		Ilona Hlaváčková (CZE)	
2003	Ilona Hlaváčková (CZE)	1:01.74	Reiko Nakamura (JPN)	1:02.18	Aya Terakawa (JPN)	1:02.43
2005	Aya Terakawa (JPN)	1:01.38	Masaki Oikawa (JPN)	1:02.44	Iryna Amshennikova (UKR)	1:02.53
2007	Aya Terakawa (JPN)	1:01.50	Kateryna Zubkova (UKR)	1:01.67	Chen Yanyan (CHN)	1:01.89
2009	Shiho Sakai (JPN)	1:00.30	Katy Murdoch (CAN)	1:00.92	Eri Tabei (JPN)	1:01.01
2011	Shiho Sakai (JPN)	1:00.28	Jenny Connolly (USA)	1:00.50	Aliaksandra Herasimenia (BLR)	1:00.91
2013	Anastasia Zueva (RUS)	59.83	Megan Romano (USA)	59.85	Madison Wilson (AUS)	1:00.65
2015	Kylie Masse (CAN)	59.97	Elizabeth Pelton (USA)	1:00.65	Rachel Bootsma (USA)	1:00.78
2017	Sian Whittaker (AUS)	1:00.14	Hannah Stevens (USA)	1:00.23	Anna Konishi (JPN)	1:00.33
2019	Katharine Berkoff (USA)	59.29	Elise Haan (USA)	59.62	Silvia Scalia (ITA)	1:00.43
2021	Adela Piskorska (POL)	1:00.20	Camila Rebelo (POR)	1:00.52	Federica Toma (ITA)	1:00.65

=== 200 m backstroke ===
Games	Gold		Silver		Bronze	
1979	Carmen Bunaciu (ROM)	2:16.20	Margaret Browne (USA)	2:23.08	Christine Breedy (USA)	2:25.86
1981	Carmen Bunaciu (ROM)	2:13.21	Kim Carlisle (USA)	2:19.02	Susan Walsh (USA)	2:19.11
1983	Larisa Gorchakova (URS)	2:15.37	Carmen Bunaciu (ROM)	2:15.96	Susan Walsh (USA)	2:16.41
1985	Jolanda de Rover (NED)	2:13.34	Michelle Donahue (USA)	2:13.81	Carmen Bunaciu (ROM)	2:17.63
1987	Aneta Patrascoiu (ROM)	2:13.06	Jolanda de Rover (NED)	2:17.08	Jennifer Shannon (USA)	2:17.20
1991	Lin Li (CHN)	2:15.12	Laura Savarino (ITA)	2:16.54	Kristina Stinson (USA)	2:16.65
1993	Whitney Hedgepeth (USA)		Alecia Humphrey (USA)		Yoko Koikawa (JPN)	
1995	Yoko Koikawa (JPN)		Beth Jackson (USA)		Joanne Deakins (GBR)	
1997	Miki Nakao (JPN)	2:15.02	Noriko Inada (JPN)	2:15.88	Erin Brooks (USA)	2:16.76
1999	Miki Nakao (JPN)		Tomoko Hagiwara (JPN)		Linda Riker (USA)	
2001	Reiko Nakamura (JPN)		Tomoko Hagiwara (JPN)		Roxana Maracineanu (FRA)	
2003	Reiko Nakamura (JPN)	2:12.17	Aya Terakawa (JPN)	2:13.21	Erin Volcán (USA)	2:13.82
2005	Aya Terakawa (JPN)	2:11.81	Takami Igarashi (JPN)	2:12.23	Annika Liebs (GER)	2:13.99
2007	Kelly Harrigan (USA)	2:11.48	Melissa Ingram (NZL)	2:11.98	Takami Igarashi (JPN)	2:12.04
2009	Stephanie Proud (GBR)	2:08.91	Kristen Heiss (USA)	2:09.22	Tomoyo Fukuda (JPN)	2:11.17
2011	Shiho Sakai (JPN)	2:09.75	Hilary Caldwell (CAN)	2:11.12	Duane Da Rocha (ESP)	2:11.24
2013	Madison Wilson (AUS)	2:09.22	Daryna Zevina (UKR)	2:09.41	Hayle White (AUS)	2:09.84
2015	Lisa Bratton (USA)	2:09.31	Simona Baumrtová (CZE)	2:10.53	Yuka Kawayoke (JPN)	2:11.60
2017	Sian Whittaker (AUS)	2:09.50	Alexia Zevnik (CAN)	2:09.92	Bridgette Alexander (USA)	2:10.30
2019	Lisa Bratton (USA)	2:07.91	Asia Seidt (USA)	2:08.56	Chloe Golding (GBR)	2:09.57
2021	Liu Yaxin (CHN)	2:08.18	Camila Rebelo (POR)	2:10.47	Eszter Szabó-Feltóthy (HUN)	2:10.77

=== 50 m breaststroke ===
Games	Gold		Silver		Bronze	
2001	Tara Kirk (USA)		Kristen Woodring (USA)		Yelena Bogomazova (RUS)	
2003	Luo Xuejuan (CHN)	31.39	Jade Edmistone (AUS)	31.74	Ashley Roby (USA)	31.92
2005	Megan Jendrick (USA)	30.88	Yekaterina Kormacheva (RUS)	31.79	Janne Schäfer (GER)	31.92
2007	Janne Schäfer (GER)	30.99	Sarah Katsoulis (AUS)	31.51	Alice Mills (AUS)	31.78
2009	Daria Deeva (RUS)	31.55	Kim Dal-eun (KOR)	31.57	Ewa Scieszko (POL)	31.63
2011	Annie Chandler (USA)	31.13	Tera van Beilen (CAN)	31.45	Valentina Artemyeva (RUS)	31.74
2013	Yuliya Yefimova (RUS)	30.12	Petra Chocová (CZE)	30.99	Valentina Artemyeva (RUS)	31.39
2015	Mariya Liver (UKR)	30.73	Fiona Doyle (IRL)	31.09	Martina Carraro (ITA) Emma Reaney (USA)	31.11
2017	Andrea Cottrell (USA)	30.77	Leiston Pickett (AUS)	30.82	Jessica Eriksson (SWE) Mariya Liver (UKR)	31.50
2019	Jhennifer Alves (BRA)	30.73	Sarah Vasey (GBR)	30.81	Chelsea Hodges (AUS)	31.13
2021	Kotryna Teterevkova (LTU)	30.58	Dominika Sztandera (POL)	31.02	Jhennifer Conceição (BRA)	31.11

=== 100 m breaststroke ===
Games	Gold		Silver		Bronze	
1967	Diana Harris (GBR)	1:18.9	Cynthia Goyette (USA)	1:19.0	Christine Barnetson (AUS)	1:20.5
1970	Galina Stepanova (URS)	1:16.7	Alla Grebennikova (URS)	1:18.1	Linda Kurtz (USA)	1:18.9
1973	Lyubov Rusanova (URS)	1:15.54	Catherine Carr (USA)	1:15.60	Galina Stepanova (URS)	1:17.03
1977	Marian Stuart (CAN)	1:15.60	Amy Tasnady (USA)	1:16.66	Anna Skolarczyk (POL)	1:16.83
1979	Irena Fleissnerová (TCH)	1:14.57	Debbie Rudd (GBR)	1:14.74	Anna Skolarczyk (POL)	1:14.94
1981	Angelika Knipping (FRG)	1:14.20	Liang Weifen (CHN)	1:14.48	Lina Kačiušytė (URS)	1:14.54
1983	Larisa Belokon (URS)	1:12.17	Ayshkute Buzelite (URS)	1:13.08	Manuela Dalla Valle (ITA)	1:13.90
1985	Tanya Bogomilova (BUL)	1:09.27	Larisa Moreva (URS)	1:12.24	Manuela Dalla Valle (ITA)	1:12.33
1987	Manuela Dalla Valle (ITA)	1:10.54	Ingrid Lempereur (BEL)	1:11.37	Susannah Brownsdon (GBR)	1:11.86
1991	Guylaine Cloutier (CAN)	1:10.93	Yelena Volkova (URS)	1:11.19	Katherine Hedman (USA)	1:11.98
1993	Guylaine Cloutier (CAN)		Svitlana Bondarenko (UKR)		Yelena Rudkovskaya (BLR)	
1995	Penelope Heyns (RSA)		Helen Denman (AUS)		Nadine Neumann (AUS)	
1997	Svitlana Bondarenko (UKR)	1:10.02	Penelope Heyns (RSA)	1:10.15	Dagmara Ajnenkiel (POL)	1:10.70
1999	Amy Balcerzak (USA)		Amanda Beard (USA)		Brooke Hanson (AUS)	
2001	Xu Shan (CHN)		Zhang Yi (CHN)		Yuko Sakaguchi (JPN)	
2003	Luo Xuejuan (CHN)	1:07.45	Qi Hui (CHN)	1:08.76	Rachel Genner (GBR)	1:09.72
2005	Megan Jendrick (USA)	1:08.20	Rebecca Soni (USA)	1:08.77	Beata Kaminska (POL)	1:09.03
2007	Nanaka Tamura (JPN)	1:08.33	Sarah Katsoulis (AUS)	1:08.42	Mirna Jukić (AUT)	1:08.53
2009	Chiara Boggiatto (ITA)	1:07.15	Nađa Higl (SRB)	1:07.80; NR	Hitomi Nose (JPN)	1:07.87
2011	Sun Ye (CHN)	1:07.53	Tera van Beilen (CAN)	1:08.24	Satomi Suzuki (JPN)	1:08.45
2013	Yuliya Yefimova (RUS)	1:05.48	Fiona Doyle (IRL)	1:07.66	Laura Sogar (USA)	1:07.78
2015	Mina Matsushima (JPN)	1:06.76	Lilly King (USA)	1:06.93	Fiona Doyle (IRL)	1:07.15
2017	Kanako Watanabe (JPN)	1:06.85	Reona Aoki (JPN)	1:07.36	Andrea Cottrell (USA)	1:07.37
2019	Tatjana Schoenmaker (RSA)	1:06.42	Mai Fukasawa (JPN)	1:07.22	Kanako Watanabe (JPN)	1:07.28
2021	Kotryna Teterevkova (LTU)	1:06.74	Kaylene Corbett (RSA)	1:06.98	Dominika Sztandera (POL)	1:07.19

=== 200 m breaststroke ===
Games	Gold		Silver		Bronze	
1959	Christine Gosden (GBR)	2:59.2	Alessandra Salvi (ITA)	3:08.2	Schiemenz (FRG)	3:21.1
1961	Sanda Iordan (ROM)	2:59.6	Christine Gosden (GBR)	3:00.8	Alla Kovalenko (URS)	3:01.2
1963	Márta Egerváry (HUN)	2:54.9	Michèle Pialat (FRA)	2:59.8	Lisa Barth (BRA)	3:12.0
1965	Svetlana Babanina (URS)	2:52.4	Eva Schmidtová (TCH)	2:56.4	Márta Egerváry (HUN)	2:57.3
1967	Cynthia Goyette (USA)	2:50.1	Diana Harris (GBR)	2:54.5	Fumiko Nagumo (JPN)	2:56.2
1970	Galina Stepanova (URS)	2:45.4	Linda Kurtz (USA)	2:49.4	Alla Grebennikova (URS)	2:49.6
1973	Catherine Carr (USA)	2:42.30	Lyudmila Porubayko (URS)	2:42.68	Robyn Farrell (AUS)	2:48.49
1977	Anne Gagnon (CAN)	2:43.7	Anne Merklinger (CAN)	2:44.60	Amy Tasnady (USA)	2:44.69
1979	Irena Fleissnerová (TCH)	2:41.00	Debbie Rudd (GBR)	2:41.88	Anna Skolarczyk (POL)	2:42.81
1981	Lina Kačiušytė (URS)	2:35.85	Irena Fleissnerová (TCH)	2:38.64	Cindy Tuttle (USA)	2:41.66
1983	Larisa Belokon (URS)	2:34.02	Ayshkute Buzelite (URS)	2:34.58	Lisa Borsholt (CAN)	2:36.22
1985	Tanya Bogomilova (BUL)	2:30.30	Larisa Moreva (URS)	2:32.53	Channon Hermstad (USA)	2:36.72
1987	Ingrid Lempereur (BEL)	2:31.09	Manuela Dalla Valle (ITA)	2:31.75	Larisa Moreva (URS)	2:32.87
1991	Svetlana Kuzmina (URS)	2:31.60	Lin Li (CHN)	2:31.72	Yelena Volkova (URS)	2:32.03
1993	Svitlana Bondarenko (UKR)		Yoshie Nishioka (JPN)		Guylaine Cloutier (CAN)	
1995	Penelope Heyns (RSA)		Nadine Neumann (AUS)		Kyoko Iwasaki (JPN)	
1997	Masami Tanaka (JPN)	2:30.24	Svitlana Bondarenko (UKR)	2:30.99	Lenka Maňhalová (CZE)	2:31.38
1999	Yuko Sakaguchi (JPN)		Brooke Hanson (AUS)		Amy Balcerzak (USA)	
2001	Yuko Sakaguchi (JPN)		Anne Poleska (GER)		Zhang Yi (CHN)	
2003	Qi Hui (CHN)	2:26.25	Luo Xuejuan (CHN)	2:26.99	Fumiko Kawanabe (JPN)	2:31.06
2005	Megumi Taneda (JPN)	2:27.81	Rebecca Soni (USA)	2:27.84	Qi Hui (CHN)	2:27.94
2007	Jung Seul-ki (KOR)	2:24.67	Rie Kaneto (JPN)	2:25.63	Annamay Pierse (CAN)	2:25.73
2009	Rie Kaneto (JPN)	2:22.32	Nađa Higl (SRB)	2:24.20	Alena Alekseeva (RUS)	2:25.40
2011	Sun Ye (CHN)	2:24.63	Andrea Kropp (USA)	2:26.18	Satomi Suzuki (JPN)	2:26.67
2013	Yuliya Yefimova (RUS)	2:24.10	Laura Sogar (USA)	2:25.33	Mio Motegi (JPN)	2:25.73
2015	Keiko Fukudome (JPN)	2:24.92	Reona Aoki (JPN)	2:26.17	Martina Moravčíková (CZE)	2:27.35
2017	Kanako Watanabe (JPN)	2:24.15	Tatjana Schoenmaker (RSA)	2:24.61	Maria Temnikova (RUS)	2:24.73
2019	Tatjana Schoenmaker (RSA)	2:22.92	Emily Escobedo (USA)	2:23.65	Kanako Watanabe (JPN)	2:24.18
2021	Kotryna Teterevkova (LTU)	2:22.86	Kaylene Corbett (RSA)	2:22.99	Zhu Leiju (CHN)	2:28.71

=== 50 m butterfly ===
Games	Gold		Silver		Bronze	
2001	Bethany Goodwin (USA)		Rachel Komisarz (USA)		Zheng Xi (CHN)	
2003	Shannon Catalano (USA)	27.56	Irina Bespalova (RUS)	27.75	Kate Corkran (AUS)	27.76
2005	Vasilissa Vladykina (RUS)	26.88	Dana Vollmer (USA)	26.91	Cristina Maccagnola (ITA)	26.99
2007	Fabienne Nadarajah (AUT)	26.81	Yuka Kato (JPN)	26.82	Masae Oshimi (JPN)	26.82
2009	Sviatlana Khakhlova (BLR)	25.97	Cristina Maccagnola (ITA)	26.52	Hong Wenwen (CHN)	26.66
2011	Lu Ying (CHN)	25.98	Marieke Guehrer (AUS)	26.24	Alice Mills (AUS)	26.53
2013	Aliaksandra Herasimenia (BLR)	25.84	Katerine Savard (CAN)	26.05	Elena Gemo (ITA) Silvia Di Pietro (ITA)	26.28
2015	Lu Ying (CHN)	25.72	Svetlana Chimrova (RUS)	26.23	Holly Barratt (AUS)	26.41
2017	Aliena Schmidtke (GER)	26.16	Elena Di Liddo (ITA)	26.50	Yukina Hirayama (JPN)	26.51
2019	Tayla Lovemore (RSA)	26.25	Ai Soma (JPN)	26.38	Jeong So-eun (KOR)	26.41
2021	Zhang Yufei (CHN)	25.20	Erin Gallagher (RSA)	25.66	Viola Scotto di Carlo (ITA)	26.01

=== 100 m butterfly ===
Games	Gold		Silver		Bronze	
1959	Valentina Poznyak (URS)	1:13.9	Christine Gosden (GBR)	1:14.6	Cornelia Hruska (ITA)	1:28.1
1961	Valentina Poznyak (URS)	1:13.8	Yelena Antonova (URS) Karin Larsson (SWE)	1:16.0	No medal awarded	
1963	Márta Egerváry (HUN)	1:10.4	Olga Korényi (HUN)	1:14.0	Ankie Hulsebos (NED)	1:15.6
1965	Márta Egerváry (HUN)	1:11.6	Lyudmila Yegorova (URS)	1:11.9	Éva Erdélyi (HUN)	1:12.2
1967	Martha Randall (USA)	1:06.9	Sydnee Arth (USA)	1:07.6	Masako Ishii (JPN)	1:08.5
1970	Lynn Colella (USA); Mirjana Šegrt (YUG)	1:06.0	No medal awarded		Ellie Daniel (USA)	1:06.9
1973	Irene Arden (USA)	1:06.05	Cathy Corcione (USA)	1:07.34	Alexandra Meerzon (URS)	1:07.46
1977	Sue Hinderaker (USA)	1:03.63	Gudrun Beckmann (FRG)	1:03.84	Anca Miclaus (ROM)	1:04.61
1979	Elizabeth Rapp (USA)	1:04.04	Sue Hinderaker (USA)	1:04.88	Alla Gritchenkova (URS)	1:05.28
1981	Jill Sterkel (USA)	1:01.91	Carol Borgmann (USA)	1:02.43	Carmen Bunaciu (ROM)	1:02.98
1983	Susie Woodhouse (AUS)	1:01.79	Cinzia Savi Scarponi (ITA)	1:02.31	Naoko Kume (JPN)	1:02.48
1985	Mary T. Meagher (USA)	59.81	Melanie Buddemeyer (USA)	1:01.33	Conny van Bentum (NED)	1:01.51
1987	Ilaria Tocchini (ITA)	1:02.01	Conny van Bentum (NED)	1:02.13	Jodi Eyles (USA)	1:02.25
1991	Wang Xiaohong (CHN)	1:00.00	Qian Hong (CHN)	1:00.21	Kristin Stoudt (USA)	1:02.69
1993	Yoko Kando (JPN)		Kristie Krueger (USA)		Debbie Gaudin (CAN)	
1995	Liu Limin (CHN)		Karen Campbell (USA)		Lisa Coole (USA)	
1997	Martina Moravcová (SVK)	1:00.40	Junko Onishi (JPN)	1:01.00	Mary Bowen (USA)	1:01.33
1999	Tomoko Hagiwara (JPN)		Julia Ham (AUS)		Pang Ran (CHN)	
2001	Irina Bespalova (RUS)		Natalya Sutyagina (RUS)		Rachel Komisarz (USA)	
2003	Demerae Christianson (USA)	1:00.42	Kate Corkran (AUS)	1:00.59	Irina Bespalova (RUS)	1:00.66
2005	Otylia Jędrzejczak (POL)	58.74	Sarah Healy (GBR)	1:00.09	Demerae Christianson (USA)	1:00.16
2007	MacKenzie Downing (CAN)	58.88	Irina Bespalova (RUS)	59.02	Xu Yanwei (CHN)	59.22
2009	Hannah Wilson (HKG)	58.24	Hong Wenwen (CHN)	59.19	Ayano Kuroki (JPN)	59.44
2011	Lu Ying (CHN)	57.86	Tomoyo Fukuda (JPN)	59.08	Alice Mills (AUS)	59.11
2013	Katerine Savard (CAN)	57.63	Guo Fan (CHN)	58.98	Nao Kobayashi (JPN)	58.99
2015	Lu Ying (CHN)	57.83	Elena Di Liddo (ITA)	58.29	Katarína Listopadová (SVK)	58.37
2017	Hellen Moffitt (USA)	58.75	Elena Di Liddo (ITA)	58.81	Rachael Kelly (GBR)	58.90
2019	Tayla Lovemore (RSA)	58.74	Dakota Luther (USA)	58.82	Lisa Höpink (GER)	58.87
2021	Zhang Yufei (CHN)	56.57	Erin Gallagher (RSA)	57.64	Giulia D'Innocenzo (ITA)	58.33

=== 200 m butterfly ===
Games	Gold		Silver		Bronze	
1979	Elizabeth Rapp (USA)	2:19.11	Alla Gritchenkova (URS)	2:19.57	Jody Alexander (USA)	2:20.38
1981	Kim Carlisle (USA)	2:15.71	Susie Woodhouse (AUS)	2:15.97	Mayumi Yokoyama (USA)	2:17.52
1983	Susie Woodhouse (AUS)	2:13.50	Naoko Kume (JPN)	2:15.02	Michelle Ford (AUS)	2:15.38
1985	Mary T. Meagher (USA)	2:07.32	Kiyomi Takahashi (JPN)	2:13.87	Patty King (USA)	2:15.06
1987	Elizabeth Roussaki (GRE)	2:12.59	Aneta Patrascoiu (ROM)	2:14.26	Noemi Lung (ROM)	2:14.74
1991	Wang Xiaohong (CHN)	2:10.76	Yumiko Ichioka (JPN)	2:14.30	Mojca Cater (CAN)	2:15.57
1993	Yoko Kando (JPN)		Paige Wilson (USA)		Kirsten Silvester (NED)	
1995	Tomoko Kunimitsu (JPN)		Liu Limin (CHN)		Annette Salmeen (USA)	
1997	Anna Uryniuk (POL)	2:12.39	Mika Haruna (JPN)	2:13.58	Jean Todisco (USA)	2:14.08
1999	María Peláez (ESP)		Pang Ran (CHN)		Noriko Maekawa (JPN)	
2001	Yuko Nakanishi (JPN)		Yekaterina Vinogradova (RUS)		Margie Pedder (GBR)	
2003	Yana Klochkova (UKR)	2:09.52	Paola Cavallino (ITA)	2:11.52	Yukiko Osada (JPN)	2:12.59
2005	Otylia Jędrzejczak (POL)	2:09.67	Kim Vandenberg (USA)	2:10.40	Terri Dunning (GBR)	2:11.73
2007	Audrey Lacroix (CAN)	2:06.83	MacKenzie Downing (CAN)	2:08.83	Sara Isaković (SLO)	2:09.45
2009	Annika Mehlhorn (GER)	2:07.35	Lyndsay DePaul (USA)	2:09.89	Haruka Minamizono (JPN)	2:10.01
2011	Jessica Dickons (GBR)	2:08.91	Natsumi Hoshi (JPN)	2:08.94	Choi Hye-ra (KOR)	2:09.35
2013	Kona Fujita (JPN)	2:09.66	Nao Kobayashi (JPN)	2:10.65	Yana Martynova (RUS)	2:10.72
2015	Zhou Yilin (CHN)	2:07.69	Alessia Polieri (ITA)	2:08.66	Hali Flickinger (USA)	2:08.80
2017	Ella Eastin (USA)	2:08.21	Martina van Berkel (SUI)	2:11.32	Nida Eliz Üstündağ (TUR)	2:11.40
2019	Dakota Luther (USA)	2:07.92	Olivia Carter (USA)	2:09.05	Sachi Mochida (JPN)	2:09.38
2021	Antonella Crispino (ITA)	2:09.10	Dalma Sebestyén (HUN)	2:09.12	Chiho Mizuguchi (JPN)	2:09.65

=== 200 m individual medley ===
Games	Gold		Silver		Bronze	
1967	Maddie Ellis (USA)	2:31.3	Debbie Ledford (USA)	2:32.8	Carla Galle (BEL)	2:41.9
1970	Lynn Colella (USA)	2:31.4	Lidiya Milenina (URS)	2:32.1	Kathy Thomas (USA)	2:34.5
1973	Susie Atwood (USA)	2:26.38	Catherine Carr (USA)	2:28.65	Birutė Užkuraitytė (URS)	2:29.30
1977	Bonnie Glasgow (USA)	2:20.66	Jennie Franks (USA)	2:23.82	Danielle Balla (CAN)	2:27.22
1981	Kim Carlisle (USA)	2:20.43	Olga Klevakina (URS)	2:20.81	Barbara Selter (FRG)	2:24.17
1983	Irina Gerasimova (URS)	2:18.23	Cinzia Savi Scarponi (ITA)	2:19.75	Vera Barker (USA)	2:20.63
1985	Svitlana Kopchykova (URS)	2:18.11	Michelle Pearson (AUS)	2:18.21	Tanya Bogomilova (BUL)	2:19.36
1987	Noemi Lung (ROM)	2:15.64	Mildred Muis (NED)	2:18.21	Marianne Muis (NED)	2:18.31
1991	Lin Li (CHN)	2:14.22	Alicja Pęczak (POL)	2:18.84	Marie-Pierre Wirth (FRA)	2:20.83
1993	Marianne Limpert (CAN)		Nancy Sweetnam (CAN)		Whitney Hedgepeth (USA)	
1995	Fumie Kurotori (JPN)		Lenka Maňhalová (CZE)		Martina Moravcová (SVK)	
1997	Martina Moravcová (SVK)	2:15.55	Elli Overton (AUS)	2:17.50	Lenka Maňhalová (CZE)	2:17.59
1999	Tomoko Hagiwara (JPN)		Sabine Herbst (GER)		Elizabeth Warden (CAN)	
2001	Yana Klochkova (UKR)		Tomoko Hagiwara (JPN)		Liang Shuang (CHN)	
2003	Yana Klochkova (UKR)	2:13.32	Qi Hui (CHN)	2:15.86	Maiko Fujino (JPN)	2:17.41
2005	Qi Hui (CHN)	2:14.99	Helen Norfolk (NZL)	2:16.03	Nicole Hetzer (GER)	2:17.22
2007	Kaitlin Sandeno (USA)	2:12.13	Yana Klochkova (UKR)	2:13.15	Alice Mills (AUS)	2:14.37
2009	Ava Ohlgren (USA)	2:12.07	Asami Kitagawa (JPN)	2:13.39	Tomoyo Fukuda (JPN)	2:13.71
2011	Izumi Kato (JPN)	2:13.52	Choi Hye-ra (KOR)	2:14.17	Liu Jing (CHN)	2:14.3
2013	Viktoriya Andreyeva (RUS)	2:12.32	Sarah Henry (USA)	2:12.69	Melanie Margalis (USA)	2:12.96
2015	Zhang Sishi (CHN)	2:12.31	Madisyn Cox (USA)	2:12.77	Ellen Fullerton (AUS)	2:13.48
2017	Yui Ohashi (JPN)	2:10.03	Ella Eastin (USA)	2:11.12	Kim Seo-yeong (KOR)	2:11.62
2019	Alicia Wilson (GBR)	2:11.35	Ella Eastin (USA)	2:12.24	Runa Imai (JPN)	2:12.25
2021	Anita Gastaldi (ITA)	2:12.74	Dalma Sebestyén (HUN)	2:13.44	Caroline Theil (USA)	2:14.28

=== 400 m individual medley ===
Games	Gold		Silver		Bronze	
1979	Janet Buchan (USA)	5:06.6	Bonnie Glasgow (USA)	5:08.1	Irena Fleissnerová (TCH)	5:12.8
1981	Mayumi Yokoyama (USA)	4:55.45	Irinel Pănulescu (ROM)	5:03.78	Małgorzata Różycka (POL)	5:07.49
1983	Irina Gerasimova (URS)	4:52.27	Cinzia Savi Scarponi (ITA)	4:55.77	Christi Woolger (USA)	4:56.70
1985	Channon Hermstad (USA)	4:49.84	Michelle Pearson (AUS)	4:51.20	Aivi Liiv (URS)	4:52.04
1987	Noemi Lung (ROM)	4:42.95	Aneta Patrascoiu (ROM)	4:50.75	Janelie Bosse (USA)	4:52.98
1991	Lin Li (CHN)	4:42.58	Sheila Taormina (USA)	4:52.10	Patricia Noall (CAN)	4:52.17
1993	Nancy Sweetnam (CAN)		Hana Černá (CZE)		Hideko Hiranaka (JPN)	
1995	Fumie Kurotori (JPN)		Hideko Hiranaka (JPN)		Kerri Hale (USA)	
1997	Fumie Kurotori (JPN)	4:46.20	Hana Černá (CZE)	4:48.20	Elli Overton (AUS)	4:52.40
1999	Hana Černá (CZE)		Beatrice Câșlaru (ROU)		Corrie Murphy (USA)	
2001	Federica Biscia (ITA) Liang Shuang (CHN)		No medal awarded		Hana Černá (CZE)	
2003	Yana Klochkova (UKR)	4:45.01	Maiko Fujino (JPN)	4:48.44	Rebecca Cooke (GBR)	4:48.59
2005	Qi Hui (CHN)	4:45.24	Rebecca Cooke (GBR)	4:45.62	Nicole Hetzer (GER)	4:46.62
2007	Yana Klochkova (UKR)	4:37.50	Kaitlin Sandeno (USA)	4:41.57	Zhang Xin (CHN)	4:42.49
2009	Ava Ohlgren (USA)	4:40.61	Lyndsay DePaul (USA)	4:41.94	Svetlana Karpeeva (RUS)	4:44.26
2011	Maya DiRado (USA)	4:40.79	Miho Takahashi (JPN)	4:42.28	Jördis Steinegger (AUT)	4:43.30
2013	Yana Martynova (RUS)	4:39.02	Meghan Hawthorne (USA)	4:40.40	Sakiko Shimizu (JPN)	4:42.09
2015	Sarah Henry (USA)	4:38.88	Barbora Závadová (CZE)	4:40.03	Hali Flickinger (USA)	4:40.54
2017	Yui Ohashi (JPN)	4:34.40	Allyson McHugh (USA)	4:40.22	Kim Seo-yeong (KOR)	4:41.52
2019	Makayla Sargent (USA)	4:37.95	Genevieve Pfeifer (USA)	4:40.16	Ilaria Cusinato (ITA)	4:40.18
2021	Ichika Kajimoto (JPN)	4:41.65	Megan van Berkom (USA)	4:42.47	Paige MacEachern (USA)	4:45.81

=== 4×100 m freestyle relay ===
Games	Gold		Silver		Bronze	
1959	Great Britain (GBR)	4:54.9	West Germany (FRG)	5:02.9	Italy (ITA)	5:06.4
1961	Soviet Union (URS)	4:39.5	Czechoslovakia (TCH)	4:41.2	Poland (POL)	4:52.2
1963	Hungary (HUN)	4:25.0	France (FRA)	5:03.7	Brazil (BRA)	5:13.7
1965	Hungary (HUN)	4:21.8	Great Britain (GBR)	4:27.9	Soviet Union (URS)	4:31.1
1967	United States (USA); Linda Gustavson; Lynne Allsup; Martha Randall; Maddie Ellis	4:04.2	Japan (JPN)	4:18.8	Italy (ITA)	4:21.8
1970	United States (USA); Marsha McCuen; Benoit; Kaye Hall; Laura Fritz	4:09.5	Yugoslavia (YUG)	4:20.2	Great Britain (GBR)	4:21.6
1973	United States (USA); Cathy Corcione; Elizabeth Tullis; Eadie Wetsel; Sally Tuttle	4:01.04	Soviet Union (URS)	4:07.83	West Germany (FRG)	4:10.41
1977	United States (USA); Shawn Houghton; Bonny Brown; Beth Harrell; Sue Hinderaker	3:53.70	Canada (CAN)	4:01.02	West Germany (FRG)	4:03.23
1979	United States (USA); B.Harris; Sue Hinderaker; Bonnie Glasgow; Tracy Caulkins	3:56.75	Netherlands (NED)	3:59.16	Canada (CAN)	4:01.15
1981	United States (USA); Annie Lett; Carol Borgmann; Barbara Major; Jill Sterkel	3:55.05	Soviet Union (URS); Irina Laricheva; Olga Eliseeva; Irina Orliuk; Olga Klevakina	3:57.64	Canada (CAN); Kelly Neuber; Leslie Brafield; Sylvie Kennedy; Valerie Whyte	4:00.59
1983	Soviet Union (URS)	3:49.64	United States (USA); E. Emery; J. Williams; I. Lawrence; Tammy Thomas	3:50.19	Canada (CAN); Maureen New	3:54.67
1985	United States (USA); Jennifer Boyd; Paige Zemina; Kirsten Wengler; Jenna Johnson	3:49.10	Soviet Union (URS)	3:51.17	Netherlands (NED)	3:51.42
1987	Netherlands (NED)	3:47.94	United States (USA)	3:48.56	Italy (ITA)	3:52.97
1991	China (CHN)	3:46.41	United States (USA); Dyne Burrell; Grace Cornelius; Melanie Morgan; Julie Sommer	3:47.48	Canada (CAN)	3:49.73
1993	United States (USA)		Canada (CAN)		Germany (GER)	
1995	United States (USA)		Italy (ITA)		Japan (JPN)	
1997	United States (USA)	3:47.80	Italy (ITA)	3:51.37	Australia (AUS)	3:52.43
1999	United States (USA)		Italy (ITA)		China (CHN)	
2001	United States (USA)		Japan (JPN)		China (CHN)	
2003	France (FRA); Aurore Mongel; Céline Couderc; Magali Monchaux; Solenne Figuès	3:45.50	United States (USA); Rebekah Short; Jessica Perruquet; Marie Marsman; Stephanie Williams	3:45.68	China (CHN); Xu Yanwei; Zhan Shu; Pang Jiaying; Chen Hua	3:47.50
2005	United States (USA); Andrea Hupman; Maritza Correia; Sarah Wanezek; Dana Vollmer	3:43.97	New Zealand (NZL); Alison Fitch; Helen Norfolk; Georgina Toomey; Rina Te Taite	3:46.59	France (FRA); Elsa N'Guessan; Mylène Lazare; Amandine Bouysset; Angela Tavernier	3:46.68
2007	United States (USA); Emily Silver; Kara Denby; Courtney Cashion; Andrea Hupman	3:40.85	China (CHN); Xu Yanwei; Chen Yanyan; Zhu Yingwen; Pang Jiaying	3:41.38	Germany (GER); Britta Steffen; Sonja Schöber; Annika Lurz; Katharina Schiller	3:42.68
2009	United States (USA); Michelle King (56.42); Madison Kennedy (54.94); Ava Ohlgren (55.77); Morgan Scroggy (54.68); Chelsea Nauta	3:41.81	Japan (JPN); Yayoi Matsumoto (56.18); Misaki Yamaguchi (55.08); Asami Kitagawa (55.67); Shiho Sakai (55.67)	3:42.60	Canada (CAN); Marie-Pier Ratelle (55.64); Breanna Hendriks (55.97); Katy Murdoch (55.58); Seanna Mitchell (55.90); Hayley Nell	3:43.09
2011	Australia (AUS); Cate Campbell (55.26); Alice Mills (55.35); Jessica Morrison (55.82); Marieke Guehrer (53.60)	3:40.03	United States (USA); Kate Dwelley (55.22); Felicia Lee (55.22); Shannon Vreeland (55.46); Megan Romano (54.13)	3:40.19	China (CHN); Zhu Qianwei (55.31); Lu Ying (55.94); Liu Jing (55.67); Tang Yi (53.37)	3:40.29
2013	Russia (RUS); Viktoriya Andreyeva; Daria Belyakina; Margarita Nesterova; Veronika Popova	3:38.15	United States (USA); Rachael Acker; Liv Jensen; Andrea Murez; Megan Romano	3:38.60	Canada (CAN); Caroline Lapierre-Lemire; Brittany MacLean; Sandrine Mainville; Paige Schultz	3:40.71
2015	United States (USA); Abbey Weitzeil; Shannon Vreeland; Madeline Locus; Lia Neal	3:38.12	Japan (JPN); Yui Yamane; Yasuko Miyamoto; Aya Sato; Mari Sumiyoshi	3:41.15	Russia (RUS); Polina Lapshina; Margarita Nesterova; Elizaveta Bazarova; Rozaliya Nasretdinova	3:41.34
2017	Canada (CAN); Katerine Savard (54.93); Jacqueline Keire (54.25); Sarah Fournier (55.93); Alexia Zevnik (54.10); Kennedy Goss; Kelsey Wog	3:39.21	Russia (RUS); Maria Kameneva (54.79); Polina Lapshina (54.87); Anastasia Guzhenkova (54.98); Arina Openysheva (54.75); Mariya Baklakova	3:39.39	United States (USA); Caroline Baldwin (54.57); Claire Rasmus (55.72); Katrina Konopka (55.61); Veronica Burchill (54.19); Katie Drabot; Katie McLaughlin	3:40.09
2019	United States (USA); Veronica Burchill (55.39); Claire Rasmus (54.63); Catherine DeLoof (54.10); Gabby DeLoof (53.87); Claire Adams	3:37.99	Japan (JPN); Mayuka Yamamoto (56.15); Sachi Mochida (55.60); Kanako Watanabe (55.55); Runa Imai (54.44); Aki Nishizu	3:41.74	Italy (ITA); Paola Biagioli (55.75); Gioelemaria Origlia (55.72); Giulia Verona (55.52); Aglaia Pezzato (54.85)	3:41.84
2021	China (CHN); Li Bingjie; Liu Yaxin; Luo Youyang; Zhang Yufei; Zhang Yifan	3:37.51	Italy (ITA); Anita Gastaldi; Viola Scotto di Carlo; Paola Biagioli; Giulia D'Innocenzo; Antonietta Cesarano	3:38.81	Japan (JPN); Momoka Yoshii; Hazuki Yamamoto; Riru Kubota; Shiho Matsumoto	3:41.83

=== 4×200 m freestyle relay ===
Games	Gold		Silver		Bronze	
1983	Soviet Union (URS)	8:21.78	Australia (AUS)	8:22.74	West Germany (FRG)	8:23.48
1985	United States (USA); Paige Zemina; Stacy Shupe; Francie O'Leary; Mary T. Meagher	8:15.14	Australia (AUS); Michelle Pearson; Jenny Messenger; Rebecca Whitehead; Michelle Ford	8:21.78	Netherlands (NED)	8:22.74
1987	United States (USA); Francie O'Leary; Lisa Meyers; Cheryl Kriegsman; Mitzi Kremer	8:09.50	Netherlands (NED)	8:17.51	Romania (ROM)	8:21.50
1991	Soviet Union (URS)	8:14.48	United States (USA); Dyne Burrell; Karen Kraemer; Sionainn Marcoux; Amy Ward	8:14.54	Canada (CAN)	8:28.20
1993	Canada (CAN)		Great Britain (GBR)		France (FRA)	
1995	Canada (CAN)		Japan (JPN)		Great Britain (GBR)	
1997	United States (USA)	8:12.16	Australia (AUS)	8:26.97	Italy (ITA)	8:27.11
1999	Canada (CAN)		Italy (ITA)		Great Britain (GBR)	
2001	United States (USA)		Japan (JPN)		China (CHN)	
2003	China (CHN); Xu Yanwei; Qi Hui; Chen Hua; Pang Jiaying	8:05.86	United States (USA); Magdalena Dyszkiewicz; Heather Kemp; Jessica Perruquet; Stephanie Williams	8:08.84	Russia (RUS); Nataliya Shalagina; Irina Korovina; Irina Ufimtseva; Ekaterina Nasyrova	8:13.99
2005	United States (USA); Lauren Medina; Elizabeth Hill; Ashley Chandler; Carmen Retrum	8:05.92	New Zealand (NZL); Helen Norfolk; Melissa Ingram; Alison Fitch; Rina Te Taite	8:09.09	France (FRA); Angela Tavernier; Sophie Huber; Mylène Lazare; Elsa N'Guessan	8:09.50
2007	United States (USA); Kate Dwelley; Erin Reilly; Lindsey Smith; Kaitlin Sandeno	7:57.87	China (CHN); Tan Miao; Xu Yanwei; Zhu Yingwen; Pang Jiaying	7:58.28	Italy (ITA); Flavia Zoccari; Roberta Ioppi; Alice Carpanese; Federica Pellegrini	8:01.11
2009	United States (USA); Ava Ohlgren (2:01.92); Morgan Scroggy (1:59.06); Chelsea Nauta (2:00.07); Kristen Heiss (1:59.44)	8:00.49	Canada (CAN); Kevyn Peterson (1:59.08); Breanna Hendriks (1:59.01); Seanna Mitchell (2:02.88); Katy Murdoch (2:01.80)	8:03.67	Italy (ITA); Silvia Florio (2:02.01); Erica Buratto (1:59.43); Roberta Ioppi (2:01.57); Ambra Migliori (2:03.13)	8:06.14
2011	United States; Karlee Bispo (2:00.19); Chelsea Nauta (1:58.66); Kate Dwelley (1:58.76); Megan Romano (1:57.41)	7:55.02	New Zealand; Natasha Hind (2:00.57); Melissa Ingram (2:00.56); Amaka Gessler (1:59.87); Lauren Boyle (1:58.60)	7:59.60	China; Tang Yi (1:58.17); Zhu Qianwei (1:57.88); Liu Jing (2:00.88); Lu Ying (2:02.69)	7:59.62
2013	United States (USA); Andrea Murez; Sarah Henry; Chelsea Chenault; Megan Romano	7:55.53	Russia (RUS); Veronika Popova; Daria Belyakina; Elena Sokolova; Viktoriya Andreyeva	7:55.76	Canada (CAN); Lindsay Delmar; Brittany MacLean; Paige Schultz; Savannah King	8:02.73
2015	United States (USA); Chelsea Chenault; Hali Flickinger; Leah Smith; Shannon Vreeland	7:53.88	China (CHN); Wang Shijia; Zhang Jiaqi; Zhou Yilin; Zhang Sishi	8:01.09	Japan (JPN); Aya Takano; Yui Yamane; Asami Chida; Yasuko Miyamoto	8:01.18
2017	Russia (RUS); Anastasia Guzhenkova (1:58.84); Valeriya Salamatina (1:59.00); Mariya Baklakova (1:59.72); Arina Openysheva (1:57.72); Anna Egorova	7:55.28	United States (USA); Claire Rasmus (1:58.85); Katie Drabot (1:58.75); Katie McLaughlin (1:59.11); Ella Eastin (1:58.61); Kaersten Meitz; Allyson McHugh; Asia Seidt; Brooke Forde	7:55.32	Japan (JPN); Chihiro Igarashi (1:59.15); Rika Omoto (2:00.50); Wakaba Tsuyuuchi (2:01.08); Yui Ohashi (1:58.86); Tsuzumi Hasegawa	7:59.59
2019	United States (USA); Kaersten Meitz (1:58.23); Paige Madden (1:59.33); Claire Rasmus (1:58.81); Gabby DeLoof (1:57.53); Catherine DeLoof; Sierra Schmidt	7:53.90	Italy (ITA); Linda Caponi (1:58.97); Paola Biagioli (2:00.48); Alice Scarabelli (1:58.83); Sara Ongaro (2:01.40); Gioelemaria Origlia	7:59.68	Russia (RUS); Mariya Baklakova (1:59.47); Irina Krivonogova (1:59.40); Irina Prikhodko (1:59.98); Elizaveta Klevanovich (2:05.00); Anastasiia Osipenko; Vasilissa Buinaia; Ksenia Vasilenok; Aleksandra Denisenko	8:03.85
2021	China (CHN); Liu Yaxin; Jing Shangbeihua; Zhang Yufei; Li Bingjie; Gao Xing; Zhang Yifan; Chen Keyi	7:58.77	United States (USA); Amy Tang; Megan van Berkom; Mackenzie Hodges; Paige MacEachern; Noelle Harvey; Sabrina Johnston	8:02.28	Japan (JPN); Momoka Yoshii; Shiho Matsumoto; Kanon Nagao; Ichika Kajimoto; Hazuki Yamamoto	8:04.29

=== 4×100 m medley relay ===
Games	Gold		Silver		Bronze	
1959	Italy (ITA)	5:25.5	Great Britain (GBR)	5:32.8	West Germany (FRG)	5:47.4
1961	Soviet Union (URS)	5:04.5	Romania (ROM)	5:12.2	Czechoslovakia (TCH)	5:15.7
1963	Hungary (HUN)	4:52.6	France (FRA)	5:23.0	Brazil (BRA)	5:55.1
1965	Hungary (HUN)	4:49.6	Soviet Union (URS)	4:52.4	Czechoslovakia (TCH)	5:04.1
1967	United States (USA); Kendis Moore; Cynthia Goyette; Martha Randall; Linda Gustavson	4:36.2	Great Britain (GBR); Japan (JPN)	4:50.1	Not Awarded	
1970	United States (USA); Kaye Hall; Linda Kurtz; Lynn Colella; Marsha McCuen	4:35.1	Soviet Union (URS)	4:41.6	Yugoslavia (YUG)	4:43.3
1973	United States (USA); Elizabeth Tullis; Catherine Carr; Irene Arden; Sally Tuttle	4:29.78	Soviet Union (URS)	4:31.27	West Germany (FRG)	4:46.63
1977	United States (USA); Meg McCully; Amy Tasnady; Beth Harrell; Sue Hinderaker	4:29.78	Soviet Union (URS)	4:31.27	West Germany (FRG)	4:46.63
1979	United States (USA); Christine Breedy; Gayle Hegel; Elizabeth Rapp; Tracy Caulkins	4:22.8	Soviet Union (URS)	4:27.4	Netherlands (NED)	4:29.1
1981	United States (USA); Kim Carlisle; Patricia Waters; Jill Sterkel; Barbara Major	4:18.84	Romania (ROM); Carmen Bunaciu; Brigitte Prass; Mariana Paraschiv; Irinel Pănulescu	4:22.14	Soviet Union (URS); Irina Orliuk; Lina Kačiušytė; Olga Klevakina; Irina Laricheva	4:25.96
1983	Soviet Union (URS)	4:14.10	United States (USA); Susan Walsh; Jeanne Childs; Jane Wagstaff; J. Williams	4:16.29	Canada (CAN); Reema Abdo	4:22.46
1985	United States (USA); Michelle Donahue; Kathy Smith; Mary T. Meagher; Jenna Johnson	4:11.24	Bulgaria (BUL)	4:14.59	Australia (AUS); Michelle Pearson; Jenny Messenger; Rebecca Whitehead; Julie West	4:16.78
1987	United States (USA); Susan O'Brien; Kim Rhodenbaugh; Jodi Eyles; Aimee Berzins	4:14.38	Italy (ITA)	4:14.57	Netherlands (NED)	4:15.10
1991	United States (USA); Barbara Bedford; Katherine Hedman; Melanie Morgan; Kristin Stoudt	4:11.70	Canada (CAN)	4:15.25	Soviet Union (URS)	4:17.32
1993	United States (USA)		Japan (JPN)		Canada (CAN)	
1995	United States (USA)		Japan (JPN)		China (CHN)	
1997	Japan (JPN)	4:11.42	United States (USA)	4:11.97	South Africa (RSA)	4:15.54
1999	Japan (JPN)		United States (USA)		Ukraine (UKR)	
2001	China (CHN)		United States (USA)		Russia (RUS)	
2003	China (CHN); Zhan Shu; Luo Xuejuan; Xu Yanwei; Pang Jiaying	4:06.22	United States (USA); Beth Botsford; Ashley Roby; Demaere Christianson; Stephanie Williams	4:07.63	Japan (JPN); Reiko Nakamura; Fumiko Kawanabe; Yukiko Osada; Tomoko Nagai	4:08.89
2005	United States (USA); Hayley McGregory; Megan Jendrick; Demerae Christianson; Maritza Correia	4:07.00	Japan (JPN); Aya Terakawa; Fumiko Kawanabe; Kozue Watanabe; Kaori Yamada	4:08.99	Russia (RUS); Irina Zhiburt; Yekaterina Kormacheva; Irina Bespalova; Kira Volodina	4:10.36
2007	Japan (JPN); Aya Terakawa; Nanaka Tamura; Yuka Kato; Norie Urabe	4:03.11	United States (USA); Brooke Bishop; Ellie Weberg; Elaine Breeden; Emily Silver	4:03.96	Canada (CAN); Kelly Stefanyshyn; Annamay Pierse; MacKenzie Downing; Seanna Mitchell	4:04.52
2009	United States (USA); Lauren Rogers (1:02.24); Katlin Freeman (1:05.8); Amanda Sims (59.22); Madison Kennedy (54.61); Morgan Scroggy; Ava Ohlgren	4:01.90	Italy (ITA); Elena Gemo (1:01.70); Chiara Boggiatto (1:07.62); Cristina Maccagnola (58.30); Erica Buratto (55.13); Marialaura Simonetto	4:02.75	Russia (RUS); Kseniya Moskvina (1:01.31); Daria Deeva (1:07.60); Svetlana Fedulova (59.56); Svetlana Karpeeva (55.42)	4:03.89
2011	China; Gao Chang (1:01.59); Sun Ye (1:06.81); Lu Ying (57.52); Tang Yi (53.23)	3:59.15	United States; Jenny Connolly (1:00.21); Annie Chandler (1:07.40); Lyndsay DePaul (58.84); Megan Romano (53.70)	4:00.15	Japan; Shiho Sakai (1:00.41); Satomi Suzuki (1:07.38); Tomoyo Fukuda (58.92); Yayoi Matsumoto (54.27)	4:00.98
2013	Russia (RUS); Anastasia Zueva; Yuliya Yefimova; Veronika Popova; Viktoriya Andreyeva	3:58.04	Italy (ITA); Elena Gemo; Giulia de Ascentis; Elena Di Liddo; Erika Ferraioli	4:02.61	United States (USA); Cindy Tran; Laura Sogar; Kelsey Floyd; Megan Romano	4:02.71
2015	Italy (ITA); Carlotta Zofkova; Ilaria Scarcella; Elena Di Liddo; Laura Letrari	4:00.50	Japan (JPN); Miki Takahashi; Mina Matsushima; Rino Hosoda; Yui Yamane	4:00.61	United States (USA); Elizabeth Pelton; Lilly King; Felicia Lee; Shannon Vreeland	4:00.75
2017	Japan (JPN); Anna Konishi (1:00.93); Kanako Watanabe (1:06.73); Yukina Hirayama (58.26); Chihiro Igarashi (54.32); Reona Aoki; Ayu Iwamoto	4:00.24	United States (USA); Hannah Stevens (1:00.97); Andrea Cottrell (1:06.97); Hellen Moffitt (58.46); Caroline Baldwin (54.09); Ali DeLoof; Miranda Tucker; Katie McLaughlin; Veronica Burchill	4:00.49	Italy (ITA); Carlotta Zofkova (1:01.37); Giulia Verona (1:08.86); Elena Di Liddo (57.76); Agalia Pezzato (54.41)	4:02.40
2019	United States (USA); Katharine Berkoff (1:00.03); Emily Escobedo (1:06.72); Dakota Luther (59.01); Gabby DeLoof (54.01); Elise Haan; Veronica Burchill; Catherine DeLoof	3:59.77	Japan (JPN); Marina Furubayashi (1:00.97); Mai Fukasawa (1:07.01); Ai Soma (58.22); Runa Imai (53.87); Kanako Watanabe	4:00.07	Canada (CAN); Ingrid Wilm (1:01.04); Nina Kucheran (1:08.03); Hannah Genich (59.47); Ainsley McMurray (54.78); Sophie Angus; Sarah Watson	4:03.32
2021	China (CHN); Liu Yaxin; Zhu Leiju; Zhang Yufei; Li Bingjie; Zheng Muyan; Luo Youyang; Jing Shangbeihua; Gao Xing	3:59.67	Poland (POL); Adela Piskorska; Dominika Sztandera; Paulina Peda; Kornelia Fiedkiewicz; Wiktoria Piotrowska; Aleksandra Knop	4:00.67	Japan (JPN); Yumi Shuno; Haruna Ogata; Natsuki Hiroshita; Shiho Matsumoto; Hazuki Yamamoto Italy (ITA); Federica Toma; Anita Gastaldi; Giulia D'Innocenzo; Viola Scotto di Carlo; Francesca Pasquino; Alessia Ferraguti; Anna Pirovano; Paola Biagioli	4:02.82 4:04.82

=== 10 km marathon ===
Games	Gold		Silver		Bronze	
2011	Rachele Bruni (ITA)	2:06:49.31	Nadine Reichert (GER)	2:07:29.21	Alice Franco (ITA)	2:08:42.77
2013	Ashley Twichell (USA)	2:05:00.9	Aurora Ponselé (ITA)	2:05:31.9	Karla Šitić (CRO)	2:05:32.1
2015	Arianna Bridi (ITA)	2:03:19.4	Ilaria Raimondi (ITA)	2:03:58.9	Stephanie Peacock (USA)	2:04:53.1
2017	Anna Olasz (HUN)	2:04:12.2	Giulia Gabbrielleschi (ITA)	2:04:17.9	Adeline Furst (FRA)	2:04:23.1

== See also ==
- List of Universiade medalists in swimming (men)
