= Yann de Fabrique =

French swimmer

Personal information
- Born: July 7, 1973 (age 52)

Sport
- Sport: Swimming
Medal record
Representing France
Summer Universiade
Gold medal – first place	1993 Buffalo	200m freestyle
Gold medal – first place	1995 Fukuoka	200m freestyle
Silver medal – second place	1993 Buffalo	400m freestyle
Silver medal – second place	1993 Buffalo	4x200m freestyle relay
Silver medal – second place	1995 Fukuoka	4x200m freestyle relay
Silver medal – second place	1997 Sicily	4x200m freestyle relay
Bronze medal – third place	1995 Fukuoka	400m freestyle
Bronze medal – third place	1995 Fukuoka	1500m freestyle
European Championships
Bronze medal – third place	1993 Sheffield	4x200m freestyle relay

Yann de Fabrique Saint-Tours (born 7 July 1973) is a French former swimmer who competed in the 1992 Summer Olympics and in the 1996 Summer Olympics. He specialized in both the Freestyle and Butterfly events on the International scene where he represented France for a decade from 1992 to 2001, but never placed or won any Olympic medals.

In addition to swimming in two Olympic Games, he swam at the 1994 World Swimming Championship in Rome, Italy and three European Swimming Championships (Sheffield 1993, Istanbul 1999 and Helsinki 2000) - winning a Bronze Medal in the 4x200 Freestyle Relay in Sheffield, England. He also represented France in the 1993 Buffalo, 1995 Fukuoka and 1997 Sicily editions of the World University Games with a culmination of eight medals - two Gold, four Silver and two Bronze Medals.

His parents were both born in Martinique (FWI).
