= Hiranaka =

Hiranaka (written 平仲 or 平中) is a Japanese surname. Notable people with the surname include:

- Akinobu Hiranaka (平仲 明信, born 1963), Japanese boxer
- Hideko Hiranaka (平中 秀子, born 1973), Japanese swimmer
- Katsuyuki Hiranaka (平中 克幸, born 1981), Japanese racing driver
