= Swimming at the 1995 Summer Universiade =

Swimming at the XVIII Summer Universiade
- Venues: Fukuoka Prefectural Pool
- Dates: 24 August 1995 – 28 August 1995

The swimming competition at the 1995 Summer Universiade took place in Fukuoka, Japan from August 24 to August 28, 1995.

== Men's events ==
Event	Gold	Silver	Bronze
50 m freestyle	Fernando Scherer (BRA)	Bill Pilczuk (USA)	Jason Rosenbaum (USA)
100 m freestyle	Fernando Scherer (BRA)	Gustavo Borges (BRA)	Josh Davis (USA)
200 m freestyle	Yann deFabrique (FRA)	Dan Kanner (USA)	Masayuki Fujimoto (JPN)
400 m freestyle	Josh Davis (USA)	Dan Kanner (USA)	Yann deFabrique (FRA)
800 m freestyle	Christian Pieper (GER)	Luiz Lima (BRA)	Hisato Yasui (JPN)
1500 m freestyle	Hisato Yasui (JPN)	Luiz Lima (BRA)	Yann deFabrique (FRA)
100 m backstroke	Kurt Jachimowski (USA)	Hajime Itoi (JPN)	Bobby Brewer (USA)
200 m backstroke	Ji Sang-Jun (KOR)	Ryuji Horii (JPN)	Jason Lancaster (USA)
100 m breaststroke	Akira Hayashi (JPN)	Alexander Tkachev (RUS)	Stanislav Lopukhov (RUS)
200 m breaststroke	Alexander Tkachev (RUS)	Steve West (USA)	Akira Hayashi (JPN)
100 m butterfly	Jason Lancaster (USA)	Bill Weaver (USA)	Andrey Katachev (RUS)
200 m butterfly	Tom Malchow (USA)	Aleksandr Gorgurakiy (RUS)	
200 m butterfly	Tom Malchow (USA)	Mike Merrell (USA)	
200 m individual medley	Tom Wilkens (USA)	Jo Yoshimi (JPN)	Jason Lancaster (USA)
400 m individual medley	Iian Mull (USA)	Tatsuya Kinugasa (JPN)	Andy Potts (USA)
4 × 100 m freestyle relay	United States (USA)	Brazil (BRA)	Great Britain (GBR)
4 × 200 m freestyle relay	United States (USA)	France (FRA)	Japan (JPN)
4 × 100 m medley relay	United States (USA)	Japan (JPN)	Russia (RUS)

== Women's events ==
Event	Gold	Silver	Bronze
50 m freestyle	Sun Jialin (CHN)	Nicole DeMan (USA)	Marianne Muis (NED)
100 m freestyle	Martina Moravcová (SVK)	Lisa Coole (USA)	
100 m freestyle	Martina Moravcová (SVK)	Marianne Muis (NED)	
200 m freestyle	Lisa Jacob (USA)	Sarah Anderson (USA)	Naoko Imoto (JPN)
400 m freestyle	Emily Peters (USA)	Sarah Anderson (USA)	Sachiko Miyaji (JPN)
800 m freestyle	Tamako Kihara (JPN)	Julie Millis (USA)	Chloe Flutter (AUS)
1500 m freestyle	Tobie Smith (USA)	Julie Millis (USA)	Tamako Kihara (JPN)
100 m backstroke	Kristin Heydanek (USA)	Yoko Koikawa (JPN)	Angela Gittings (USA)
200 m backstroke	Yoko Koikawa (JPN)	Beth Jackson (USA)	Joanne Deakins (GBR)
100 m breaststroke	Penelope Heyns (RSA)	Helen Denman (AUS)	Nadine Neumann (AUS)
200 m breaststroke	Penelope Heyns (RSA)	Nadine Neumann (AUS)	Kyoko Iwasaki (JPN)
100 m butterfly	Liu Limin (CHN)	Karen Campbell (USA)	Lisa Coole (USA)
200 m butterfly	Tomoko Kunimitsu (JPN)	Liu Limin (CHN)	Annette Salmeen (USA)
200 m individual medley	Fumie Kurotori (JPN)	Lenka Maňhalová (CZE)	Martina Moravcová (SVK)
400 m individual medley	Fumie Kurotori (JPN)	Hideko Hiranaka (JPN)	Kerri Hale (USA)
4 × 100 m freestyle relay	United States (USA)	Italy (ITA)	Japan (JPN)
4 × 200 m freestyle relay	Canada (CAN)	Japan (JPN)	Great Britain (GBR)
4 × 100 m medley relay	United States (USA)	Japan (JPN)	China (CHN)

== Medal table ==
Rank	Nation	Gold	Silver	Bronze	Total
1	United States (USA)	15	14	10	39
2	Japan (JPN)	7	9	9	25
3	Brazil (BRA)	2	4	0	6
4	China (CHN)	2	1	1	4
5	South Africa (RSA)	2	0	0	2
6	Russia (RUS)	1	2	3	6
7	France (FRA)	1	1	0	2
8	Slovakia (SVK)	1	0	1	2
9	Germany (GER)	1	0	0	1
9	South Korea (KOR)	1	0	0	1
11	Australia (AUS)	0	2	2	4
12	Netherlands (NED)	0	1	1	2
13	Czech Republic (CZE)	0	1	0	1
13	Italy (ITA)	0	1	0	1
15	Great Britain (GBR)	0	0	3	3
Totals (15 entries)		33	36	30	99
