= Swimming at the 1965 Summer Universiade =

Swimming at the IV Summer Universiade

The swimming competition at the 1965 Summer Universiade took place in Budapest, Hungary.

== Men’s events ==
Event	Gold		Silver		Bronze	
100 m freestyle	Hans-Joachim Klein (FRG)	54.4	Don Roth (USA)	54.8	Gary Ilman (USA)	55.0
400 m freestyle	Semyon Belits-Geiman (URS)	4:15.6	Michael Wall (USA)	4:22.5	József Katona (HUN)	4:23.7
1500 m freestyle	Michael Wall (USA)	17:09.9	Semyon Belits-Geiman (URS)	17:17.8	Mike Burton (USA)	17:25.1
200 m backstroke	Gary Dilley (USA); Viktor Mazanov (URS)	2:13.7			Thompson Mann (USA)	2:13.9
200 m breaststroke	Osamu Tsurumine (JPN)	2:33.7	Ferenc Lenkei (HUN)	2:34.7	Wayne Anderson (USA)	2:35.0
200 m butterfly	Carl Robie (USA)	2:09.3	Butch Riker (USA)	2:10.1	Valentin Kuzmin (URS)	2:10.4
400 m individual medley	Dick Roth (USA)	4:53.0	Carl Robie (USA)	4:55.3	Oleg Fotin (URS)	4:58.3
4×100 m freestyle relay	United States (USA) Gary Dilley Gary Ilman Donald Roth Roy Saari	3:38.4	Soviet Union (URS)	3:41.4	Hungary (HUN)	3:42.2
4×200 m freestyle relay	United States (USA)	8:10.9	Soviet Union (URS)	8:14.4	Japan (JPN)	8:19.1
4×100 m medley relay	United States (USA)	4:03.9	Soviet Union (URS)	4:03.9	Hungary (HUN)	4:06.4

== Women’s events ==
Event	Gold		Silver		Bronze	
100 m freestyle	Csilla Madarász (HUN)	1:03.7	Diana Wilkinson (GBR)	1:04.0	Svetlana Babanina (URS)	1:04.3
400 m freestyle	Hilda Zeier (YUG)	5:08.9	Bep Weeteling (NED)	5:11.5	Cristina Balaban (ROM)	5:13.8
100 m backstroke	Françoise Borie (FRA)	1:11.4	Bep Weeteling (NED)	1:11.5	Cristina Balaban (ROM)	1:11.8
200 m breaststroke	Svetlana Babanina (URS)	2:52.4	Eva Schmidtová (TCH)	2:56.4	Márta Egerváry (HUN)	2:57.3
100 m butterfly	Márta Egerváry (HUN)	1:11.6	Lyudmila Yegorova (URS)	1:11.9	Eva Erdelyi (HUN)	1:12.2
4×100 m freestyle relay	Hungary (HUN)	4:21.8	Great Britain (GBR)	4:27.9	Soviet Union (URS)	4:31.1
4×100 m medley relay	Hungary (HUN)	4:49.6	Soviet Union (URS)	4:52.4	Czechoslovakia (TCH)	5:04.1

== Medal table ==
Rank	Nation	Gold	Silver	Bronze	Total
1	United States (USA)	7	4	4	15
2	Hungary (HUN)	4	1	5	10
3	Soviet Union (URS)	3	6	4	13
4	Japan (JPN)	1	0	1	2
5	France (FRA)	1	0	0	1
5	West Germany (FRG)	1	0	0	1
5	Yugoslavia (YUG)	1	0	0	1
8	Great Britain (GBR)	0	2	0	2
8	Netherlands (NED)	0	2	0	2
10	Czechoslovakia (TCH)	0	1	1	2
11	Romania (ROM)	0	0	2	2
Totals (11 entries)		18	16	17	51
