= Semyon Belits-Geiman =

Soviet swimmer (born 1945)

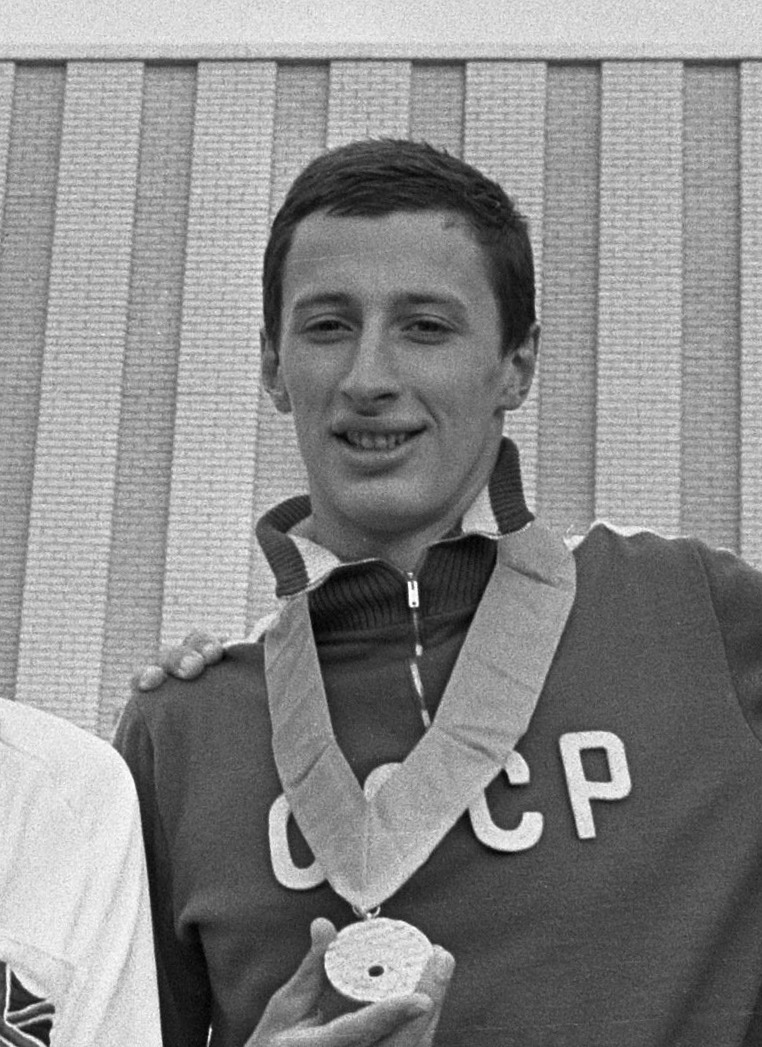
- Semyon Belits-Geiman in 1966

Personal information
- Full name: Semyon Viktorovich Belits-Geiman
- Nationality: Soviet
- Born: 16 February 1945 (age 81) Moscow, Russian SFSR, Soviet Union
- Height: 6 ft 1 in (1.85 m)
- Weight: 161 lb (73 kg)

Sport
- Sport: Swimming
- Strokes: Freestyle
- Club: Dynamo Moscow
Medal record
Representing the Soviet Union
Olympic Games
Silver medal – second place	1968 Mexico City	4×100 m freestyle
Bronze medal – third place	1968 Mexico City	4×200 m freestyle
European Championships
Gold medal – first place	1966 Utrecht	1,500 m freestyle
Gold medal – first place	1966 Utrecht	4×200 m freestyle
Silver medal – second place	1966 Utrecht	400 m freestyle
Summer Universiade
Gold medal – first place	1965 Budapest	400 m freestyle
Silver medal – second place	1965 Budapest	1,500 m freestyle
Silver medal – second place	1965 Budapest	4×100 m freestyle
Silver medal – second place	1965 Budapest	4×200 m freestyle
Silver medal – second place	1967 Tokyo	1,500 m freestyle

Semyon Viktorovich Belits-Geiman (Russian: Семён Викторович Белиц-Гейман; born 16 February 1945) is a former Soviet freestyle swimmer. He set a world record in the 800 m freestyle, and won two Olympic medals.

== Early life ==
Belits-Geiman is Jewish and was born in Moscow, where he attended the Transport Engineering Institute, studied journalism, and worked as a journalist for the magazines Sports Life in Russia and Soviet Sport.

== Swimming career ==
Belits-Geiman began swimming when he was eight. He was affiliated with the Moscow club Dynamo, and became a member of the Soviet swimming team in 1962. He competed at the 1964 Olympics in Tokyo, and finished in seventh place in the 4 × 200 m freestyle relay and eighth in the 400 meter freestyle.

At the 1965 Summer Universiade, he won the gold medal in the 400 m freestyle and three silver medals in the 1,500 m and relay races. In 1965, his time in the 1,500 m was the second-fastest in the world (17:01.90).

In 1966, he won the gold medal against three of the best American freestyle swimmers in a US vs USSR competition in Moscow. That year at the European championships in Utrecht, he won gold medals in the 1,500 m freestyle (16:58.5) and 4 × 200 m freestyle relay (8:00.2) and a silver medal in the 400 m freestyle (4:13.2; behind German Frank Wiegand, and ahead of Frenchman Alain Mosconi). In 1966, he was ranked number three in the world in the 1,500-meter freestyle.

On 8 March 1966, he set a world record in the 800 m freestyle, at 8:47.4, in Budapest. That was 4.1 seconds faster than the former record set by Australian Murray Rose in 1962.

Due to a Soviet boycott, he was unable to defend his title at the 1967 Universiade in Tokyo. Americans Greg Charlton and Mike Burton. won the 400 and 1,500 freestyle races, respectively. He did, however, win silver medals in the 400 and 1500 meter freestyle at the 1967 Little Olympic swimming competitions held at the CDOM aquatic center in Mexico City.

He won a silver medal at the 1968 Summer Olympics in Mexico City in the 4×100 freestyle relay (3:34.2), swimming the lead leg, and a bronze medal in the 4 × 200 m freestyle relay (8:01.6), swimming the second leg. In the 4 × 200 m relay, one of his teammates was Vladimir Bure. He also swam two individual freestyle events, finishing seventh in the 200 m freestyle, and ninth in the 400 m race. He broke 67 Soviet national freestyle records. In 1974, he was named president of the Moscow Swim Federation and vice president of the Soviet Union Federation.

== Post-swimming career ==
Later in his life he competed in cross-country skiing and speed skating, and became a Soviet Master of Sport and coach in both disciplines.

Beginning in the early 1980s, he developed training programs for figure skaters. He created a program to increase coordination and flexibility which was used by Australian ice dancing champions Natalie Buck and Trent Nelson-Bond in the early 2000s.

== Accolades ==
In 2017, he was inducted into the International Jewish Sports Hall of Fame.

== Personal ==
He met his wife, Russian ice dancing coach and former competitive ice dancer Natalia Dubova, when he covered one of her competitions as a sportswriter. In 1999, they moved to Stamford, Connecticut.

== See also ==
- List of select Jewish swimmers
- World record progression 800 metres freestyle
