= Oleg Fotin =

Russian swimmer (born 1945)

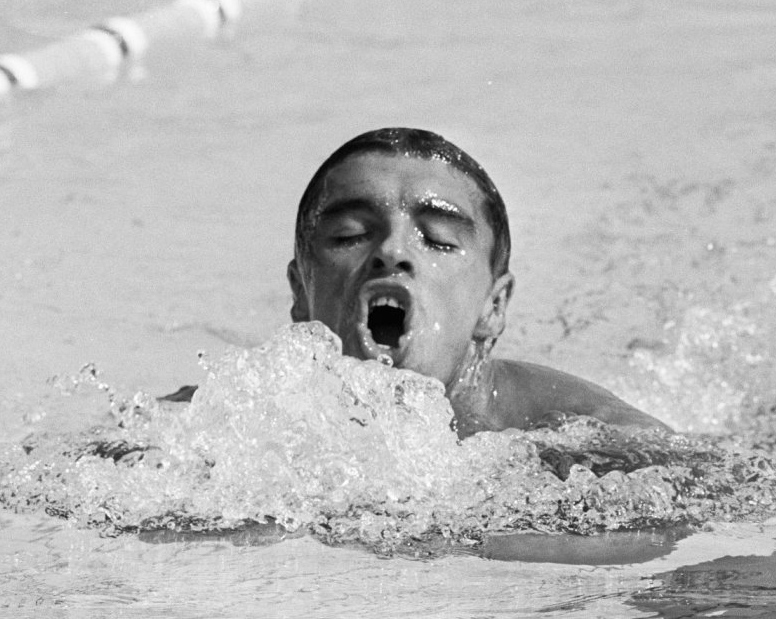
- Oleg Fotin in 1966

Personal information
- Born: 19 July 1945 (age 80) Moscow, Russia
- Height: 1.82 m (6 ft 0 in)
- Weight: 82 kg (181 lb)

Sport
- Sport: Swimming
- Club: Burevestnik Moscow
Medal record
Representing the Soviet Union
Summer Universiade
Bronze medal – third place	1965 Budapest	400 m medley

Oleg Fotin (Russian: Олег Фотин; born 19 July 1945) is a retired Russian swimmer. He competed at the 1964 Summer Olympics in the 200 m butterfly but failed to reach the finals.
