= Hisato Yasui =

Japanese swimmer (born 1976)

Personal information
- Born: June 8, 1976 (age 50)
Medal record
Men's swimming
Representing Japan
Summer Universiade
| Gold medal – first place | 1995 Fukuoka | 1500m Freestyle |
| Bronze medal – third place | 1995 Fukuoka | 800m Freestyle |
| Bronze medal – third place | 1997 Messina | 400m Freestyle |

Hisato Yasui (安井 久登, Yasui Hisato) (born June 8, 1976, in Osaka Prefecture, Japan) is a retired Japanese male freestyle swimmer. He represented Japan at the 1996 Summer Olympics in Atlanta, Georgia. He is best known for winning a gold and a bronze medal at the 1995 Summer Universiade in Fukuoka.
