= Jan Weeteling =

Dutch swimmer

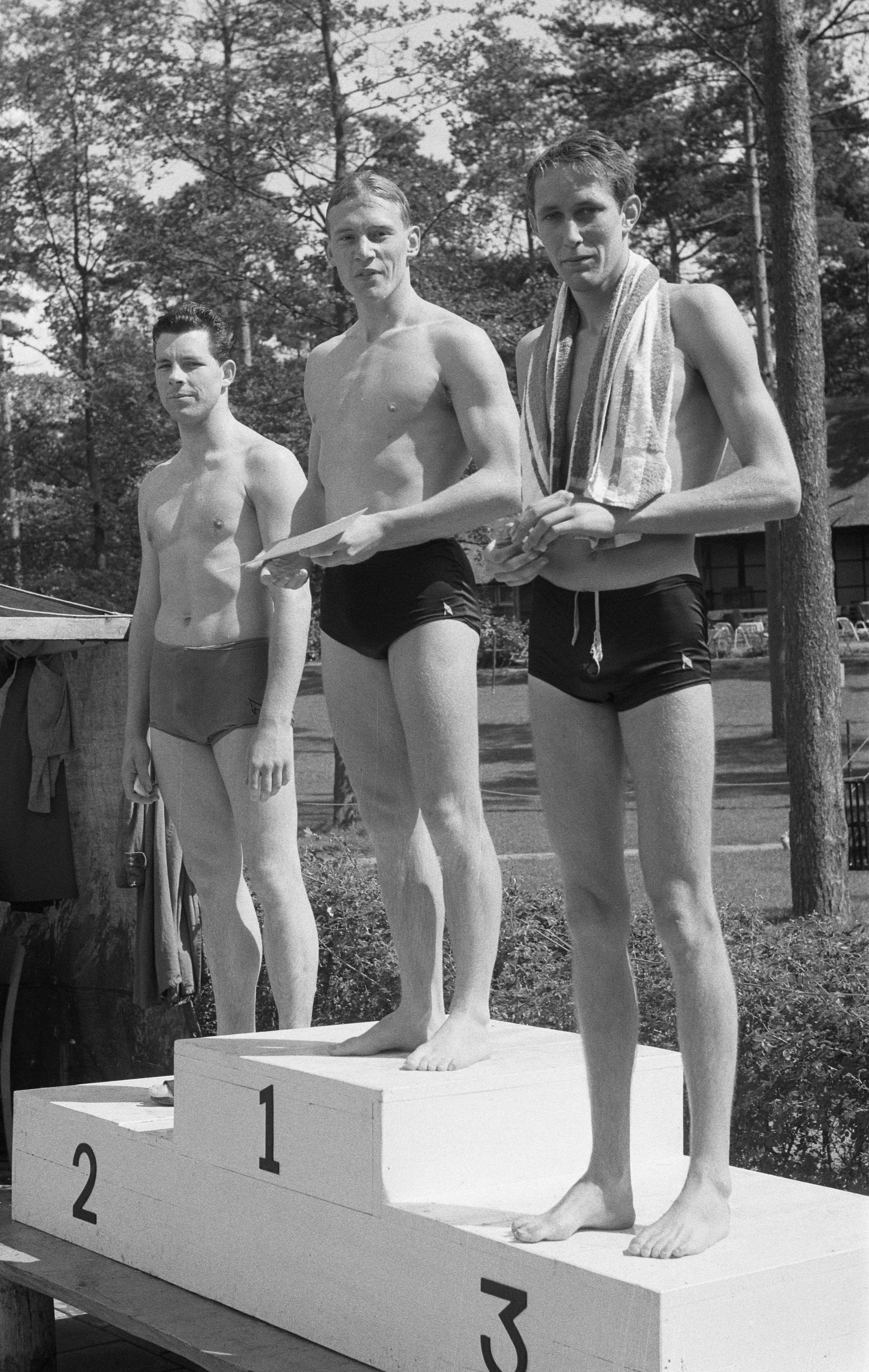
- National championships 100 m backstroke (1960), Jan Weeteling is in 3rd place

Personal information
- Born: 18 August 1940 (age 85) Zaandam, Netherlands
- Height: 1.91 m (6 ft 3 in)
- Weight: 70 kg (150 lb)

Sport
- Club: Nereus, Zaandijk
Medal record
Men's swimming
Representing the Netherlands
European Championships
| Bronze medal – third place | 1962 Leipzig | 4×100 m medley |

Jan Weeteling (born 18 August 1940) is a retired Dutch swimmer who won a bronze medal in the 4 × 100 m medley relay at the 1962 European Aquatics Championships. He also competed in the 200 m backstroke and 4 × 100 m medley relay at the 1964 Summer Olympics but was eliminated in the preliminaries. He won the silver medal in the 200 m backstroke at the 1963 Summer Universiade.

Bep is the elder brother of the former swimmer Bep Weeteling who also participated in the 1964 Olympics.
