= Ji Sang-jun =

South Korean swimmer (born 1973)

Personal information
- Full name: Ji Sang-jun
- National team: South Korea
- Born: December 12, 1973 (age 52) Goesan, South Korea
- Height: 1.78 m (5 ft 10 in)
- Weight: 67 kg (148 lb)

Korean name
- Hangul: 지상준
- Hanja: 池相俊
- RR: Ji Sangjun
- MR: Chi Sangjun

Sport
- Sport: Swimming
- Strokes: Backstroke
- Club: Saehan Media
Medal record
Men's swimming
Representing South Korea
Asian Games
Gold medal – first place	1990 Beijing	200m backstroke
Gold medal – first place	1994 Hiroshima	200m backstroke
Universiade
Gold medal – first place	1995 Fukuoka	200m Backstroke
Bronze medal – third place	1997 Messina	200m Backstroke
East Asian Games
Gold medal – first place	1993 Shanghai	200m Backstroke
Silver medal – second place	1993 Shanghai	100m Backstroke
Bronze medal – third place	1993 Shanghai	400m Freestyle relay
Bronze medal – third place	1993 Shanghai	800m Freestyle relay
Bronze medal – third place	1993 Shanghai	400m Medley relay

Ji Sang-jun (Korean: 지상준; born December 12, 1973) is a retired male backstroke and freestyle swimmer from South Korea, who represented his native country at two consecutive Summer Olympics, starting in Barcelona, Spain (1992). He is best known for winning a gold medal at the 1995 Summer Universiade in Fukuoka, Japan.
