= Hideko Hiranaka =

Japanese swimmer (born 1973)

Personal information
- Born: 1973 (age 52–53)
Medal record
Women's swimming
Representing Japan
Summer Universiade
Silver medal – second place	1995 Fukuoka	400m Individual Medley

Hideko Hiranaka (平中 秀子, Hiranaka Hideko; born July 8, 1973 in Hokkaido) is a retired female medley swimmer from Japan, who represented her native country twice at the Summer Olympics: in 1992 and 1996. She is best known for winning the silver medal in the Women's 400m Individual Medley at the 1995 Summer Universiade in Fukuoka, behind her team mate Fumie Kurotori.
