= Lisa Coole =

American swimmer

- NCAA Woman of the Year portrait of Lisa Coole

Personal information
- Full name: Lisa Coole
- National team: United States
- Born: 1975 Rockford, Illinois
- Died: May 16, 1998 Champaign, Illinois

Sport
- Sport: Swimming
- Strokes: Butterfly, freestyle
- Club: Rockford Marlins
- College team: University of Georgia
Medal record
Women's swimming
Representing the United States
Summer Universiade
Gold medal – first place	1995 Fukuoka	4x100 m freestyle
Silver medal – second place	1995 Fukuoka	100 m freestyle
Bronze medal – third place	1995 Fukuoka	100 m butterfly

Lisa Ann Coole (1975 – May 16, 1998) was a 1997 graduate of the University of Georgia who was named the NCAA Woman of the Year Award for 1997 and was also awarded the Today's Top VIII Award as a member of the Class of 1998. She won two NCAA titles and 19 All-America honors, making her the most-decorated swimmer in UGA history.

Coole was killed in an automobile accident on May 16, 1998, in Champaign, Illinois, at the age of 23. She was enrolled in veterinary school at the University of Illinois and was on her way to adopt a greyhound at the time of her death. She was inducted posthumously into the University of Georgia Circle of Honor in 1999.

== Sources ==
- Georgia Magazine September 1998: Vol. 77, No. 4
- The University of Georgia Columns 1 June 1998
- NCAA Woman of the Year profile
- "Circle of Honor" (PDF). University of Georgia Athletic Association.
