= Swimming at the 1997 Summer Universiade =

Swimming at the XIX Summer Universiade
- Venues: Swimming Pool of the Polo dell'Annuziata at the University of Messina
- Dates: 24 August 1997 – 30 August 1997

The swimming competition during the 1997 Summer Universiade, also known as the XIX Summer Universiade, was a long course event (50 m), and took place in Messina, on the island of Sicily, Italy from August 24 till August 30, 1997.

== Men's events ==
Event	Gold		Silver		Bronze	
50 m freestyle	Nathan Rickard (AUS)	22.50	Lorenzo Vismara (ITA)	23.04	Brendon Dedekind (RSA)	23.07
100 m freestyle	Marcos Hernández (CUB)	50.50	Lorenzo Vismara (ITA)	50.70	Christian Tröger (GER)	50.78
200 m freestyle	Béla Szabados (HUN)	1:50.70	Scott Goldblatt (USA)	1:51.96	Michael Kiedel (GER)	1:52.13
400 m freestyle	Luiz Lima (BRA)	3:53.91	Béla Szabados (HUN)	3:54.30	Hisato Yasui (JPN)	3:55.05
800 m freestyle	Igor Snitko (UKR)	8:05.13	Luiz Lima (BRA)	8:06.26	Marco Formentini (ITA)	8:06.37
1500 m freestyle	Luiz Lima (BRA)	15:20.83	Marco Formentini (ITA)	15:21.00	Nathaniel Lewis (USA)	15:21.15
100 m backstroke	Neisser Bent (CUB)	55.82	Robert Brewer (USA)	56.22	Mariusz Siembida (POL)	56.50
200 m backstroke	Emanuele Merisi (ITA)	2:00.29	Neisser Bent (CUB)	2:00.37	Ji Sang-Jun (KOR)	2:02.52
100 m breaststroke	Stanislav Lopukhov (RUS)	1:02.74	Alexander Tkachev (RUS)	1:02.77	Chikara Nakashita (JPN)	1:03.05
200 m breaststroke	Chikara Nakashita (JPN)	2:16.35	Scott Werner (USA)	2:27.41	William Byron Shefchik (USA)	2:17.50
100 m butterfly	Denys Sylantyev (UKR)	53.73	Shamek Pietucha (CAN)	54.33	Stephen Martyak (USA)	54.50
200 m butterfly	Denys Sylantyev (UKR)	1:59.67	Jeffrey Julian (USA)	2:00.49	Shamek Pietucha (CAN)	2:00.66
200 m individual medley	Tatsuya Kinugasa (JPN)	2:04.32	Kristopher Babylon (USA)	2:04.88	Toshiaki Kurasawa (JPN)	2:05.19
400 m individual medley	Tatsuya Kinugasa (JPN)	4:24.18	Michael Halika (ISR)	4:24.96	Stefano Battistelli (ITA)	4:25.66
4 × 100 m freestyle relay	United States (USA)	3:21.17	Australia (AUS)	3:23.75	France (FRA)	3:23.88
4 × 200 m freestyle relay	United States (USA)	7:26.78	France (FRA)	7:28.59	Germany (GER)	7:31.37
4 × 100 m medley relay	United States (USA)	3:41.95	Italy (ITA)	3:44.26	Russia (RUS)	3:44.98

== Women's events ==
Event	Gold		Silver		Bronze	
50 m freestyle	Katherine Taylor (USA)	26.12	Luminița Dobrescu (ROU)	26.32	Liesl Pimentel (USA)	26.37
100 m freestyle	Martina Moravcová (SVK)	55.47	Luminița Dobrescu (ROU)	56.16	Liesl Kolbisen (USA)	56.91
200 m freestyle	Martina Moravcová (SVK)	1:59.96	Kim Black (USA)	2:01.48	Luminița Dobrescu (ROU)	2:02.76
400 m freestyle	Eri Yamanoi (JPN)	4:16.30	Sachiko Miyaji (JPN)	4:16.40	Julie Varozza (USA)	4:16.49
800 m freestyle	Suzanne Black (USA)	8:45.82	Joy Stover (USA)	8:47.73	Eri Yamanoi (JPN)	8:48.65
1500 m freestyle	Suzanne Black (USA)	16:40.30	Joy Stover (USA)	16:45.47	Olga Šplíchalová (CZE)	16:52.83
100 m backstroke	Noriko Inada (JPN)	1:02.24	Fabíola Molina (BRA)	1:03.76	Paige Francis (USA)	1:03.89
200 m backstroke	Miki Nakao (JPN)	2:15.02	Noriko Inada (JPN)	2:15.88	Erin Brooks (USA)	2:16.76
100 m breaststroke	Svitlana Bondarenko (UKR)	1:10.02	Penny Heyns (RSA)	1:10.15	Dagmara Ajnenkiel (POL)	1:10.70
200 m breaststroke	Masami Tanaka (JPN)	2:30.24	Svitlana Bondarenko (UKR)	2:30.99	Lenka Maňhalová (CZE)	2:31.38
100 m butterfly	Martina Moravcová (SVK)	1:00.40	Junko Onishi (JPN)	1:01.00	Mary Bowen (USA)	1:01.33
200 m butterfly	Anna Uryniuk (POL)	2:12.39	Mika Haruna (JPN)	2:13.58	Jean Todisco (USA)	2:14.08
200 m individual medley	Martina Moravcová (SVK)	2:15.55	Elli Overton (AUS)	2:17.50	Lenka Maňhalová (CZE)	2:17.59
400 m individual medley	Fumie Kurotori (JPN)	4:46.20	Hana Černá (CZE)	4:48.20	Elli Overton (AUS)	4:52.40
4 × 100 m freestyle relay	United States (USA)	3:47.80	Italy (ITA)	3:51.37	Australia (AUS)	3:52.43
4 × 200 m freestyle relay	United States (USA)	8:12.16	Australia (AUS)	8:26.97	Italy (ITA)	8:27.11
4 × 100 m medley relay	Japan (JPN)	4:11.42	United States (USA)	4:11.97	South Africa (RSA)	4:15.54

== Medal table ==
Rank	Nation	Gold	Silver	Bronze	Total
1	Japan (JPN)	9	4	4	17
2	United States (USA)	8	9	10	27
3	Ukraine (UKR)	4	1	0	5
4	Slovakia (SVK)	4	0	0	4
5	Brazil (BRA)	2	2	0	4
6	Cuba (CUB)	2	1	0	3
7	Italy (ITA)	1	5	3	9
8	Australia (AUS)	1	3	2	6
9	Russia (RUS)	1	1	1	3
10	Hungary (HUN)	1	1	0	2
11	Poland (POL)	1	0	2	3
12	Romania (ROU)	0	2	1	3
13	Czech Republic (CZE)	0	1	3	4
14	South Africa (RSA)	0	1	2	3
15	Canada (CAN)	0	1	1	2
15	France (FRA)	0	1	1	2
17	Israel (ISR)	0	1	0	1
18	Germany (GER)	0	0	3	3
19	South Korea (KOR)	0	0	1	1
Totals (19 entries)		34	34	34	102
