= Stanislav Lopukhov =

Russian swimmer

Personal information
- Full name: Станислав Лопухов
- Nationality: Russia
- Born: 27 November 1972 (age 53) Kaluga, RSFSR, USSR
- Height: 1.94 m (6 ft 4 in)
- Weight: 85 kg (187 lb)

Sport
- Sport: Swimming
- Strokes: Breaststroke
Medal record
Men's swimming
Representing Russia
Olympic Games
Silver medal – second place	1996 Atlanta	4×100 m medley
World Championships (SC)
Silver medal – second place	1997 Gothenburg	100 m breaststroke
Silver medal – second place	1997 Gothenburg	4x100 m medley
Bronze medal – third place	1995 Rio de Janeiro	100 m breaststroke
World Student Games
Gold medal – first place	1997 Messina	100 m breaststroke

Stanislav Yuryevich Lopukhov (Russian: Станисла́в Ю́рьевич Лопухо́в; born 27 November 1972, Kaluga) is a retired men's breaststroke swimmer from Russia. He won the silver medal in the 4×100 metres medley relay at the 1996 Summer Olympics in Atlanta, Georgia.

== See also ==
- List of Russian records in swimming
