= Françoise Borie =

French swimmer

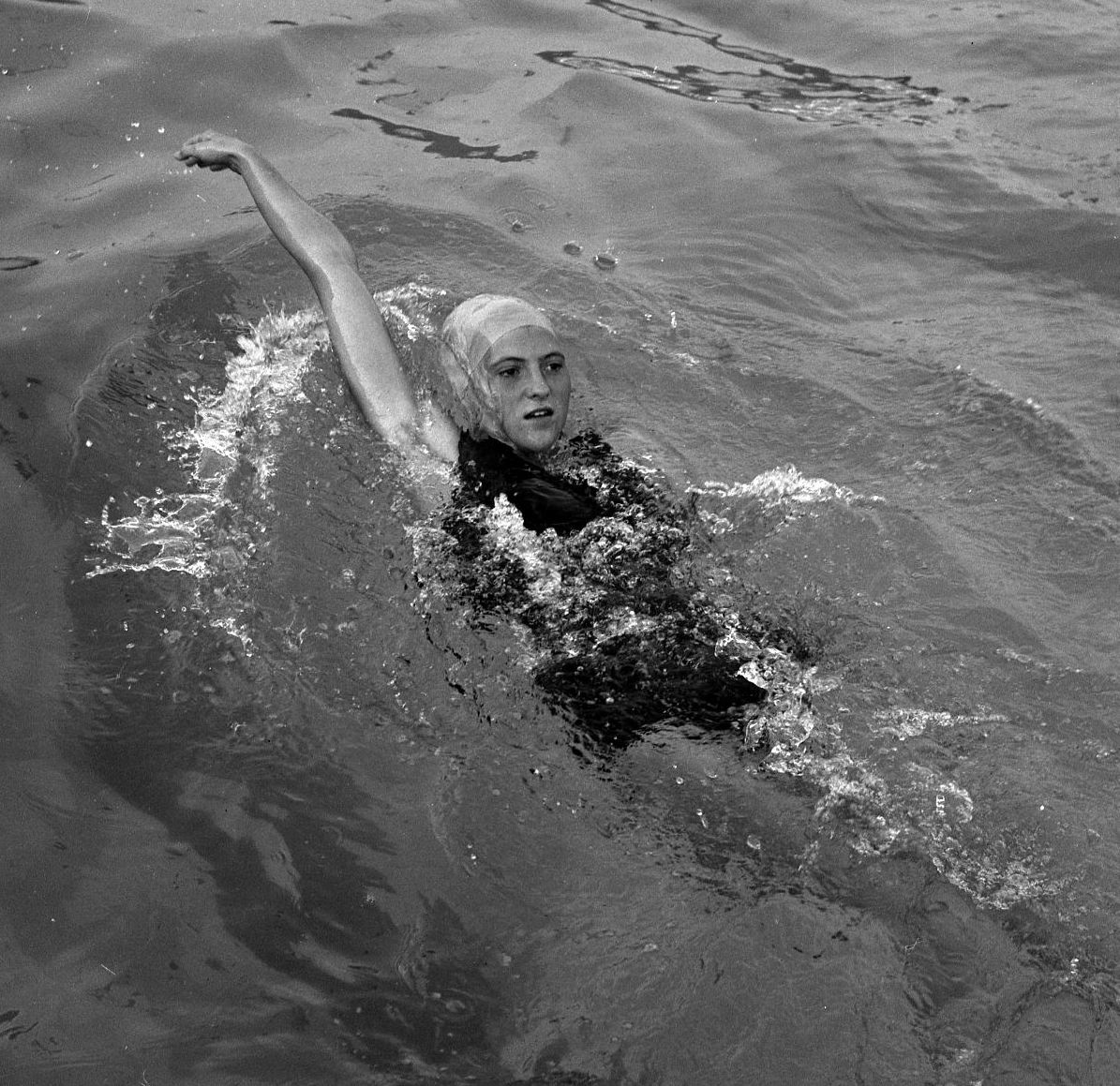
- Françoise Borie in 1964

Personal information
- Born: 16 February 1947 (age 79)

Sport
- Sport: Swimming
Medal record
Representing France
Summer Universiade
Gold medal – first place	1965 Budapest	100m backstroke
Silver medal – second place	1967 Tokyo	100m backstroke

Françoise Borie (born 16 February 1947) is a French former swimmer. She competed in the women's 100 metre backstroke at the 1964 Summer Olympics.
