= Yekaterina Vinogradova =

Russian swimmer (born 1980)

Personal information
- Born: 8 October 1980 (age 45) Moscow, Russian Soviet Federative Socialist Republic
- Height: 1.68 m (5 ft 6 in)
- Weight: 57 kg (126 lb)

Sport
- Sport: Swimming
- Club: Moskva Sports Club

Yekaterina Vinogradova (Russian: Екатерина Виноградова; born 8 October 1980) is a Russian swimmer. She competed at the 2000 Summer Olympics in the 100 m and 200 m butterfly and finished in 31st and 18th place, respectively.
