= Anna Skolarczyk =

Polish swimmer

Personal information
- Full name: Anna Maria Skolarczyk
- Born: 8 November 1956 (age 69) Tarnów, Polish People's Republic
- Height: 167 cm (5 ft 6 in)
- Weight: 65 kg (143 lb)

Sport
- Sport: Swimming
Medal record
Representing Poland
Summer Universiade
Bronze medal – third place	1977 Sofia	100m breaststroke
Bronze medal – third place	1979 Mexico City	100m breaststroke
Bronze medal – third place	1979 Mexico City	200m breaststroke

Anna Maria Skolarczyk (born 8 November 1956) is a Polish former breaststroke swimmer. She competed in two events at the 1976 Summer Olympics.
