= Bep Weeteling =

Dutch swimmer

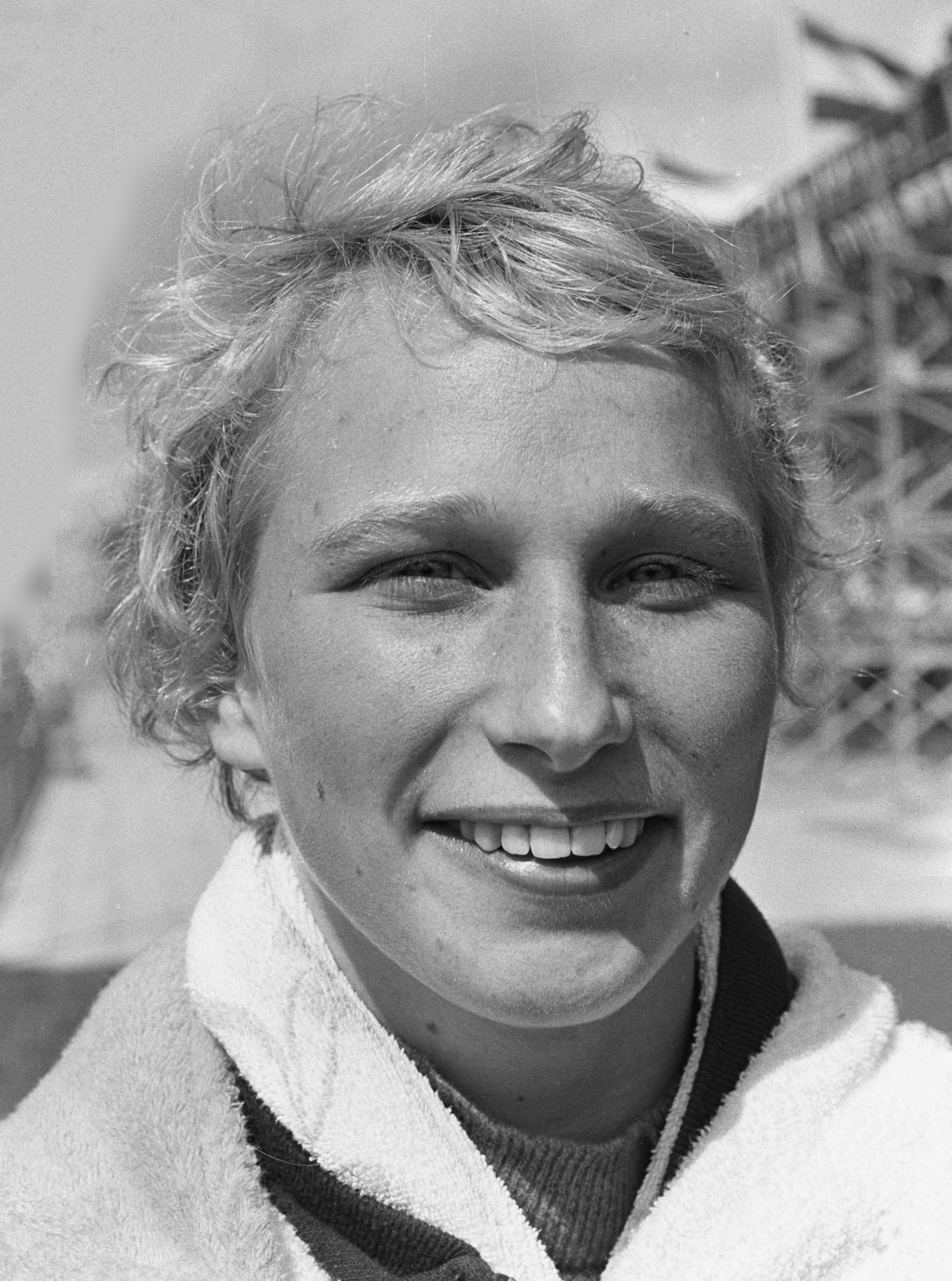
- Bep Weeteling in 1966

Personal information
- Born: 28 December 1946 (age 79) Zaandam, Netherlands
- Height: 1.65 m (5 ft 5 in)
- Weight: 52 kg (115 lb)

Sport
- Sport: Swimming
- Club: Nereus, Zaandijk
Medal record
Women's swimming
Representing the Netherlands
European Championships
Bronze medal – third place	1966 Utrecht	4×100 m freestyle

Albertha "Bep" Weeteling (born 28 December 1946) is a retired Dutch swimmer who won a bronze medal in the 4 × 100 m freestyle relay at the 1966 European Aquatics Championships. She also competed in four freestyle and backstroke disciplines at the 1964 and 1968 Summer Olympics but was eliminated in the preliminaries. She won two silver medals at the 1965 Summer Universiade, in the 400 m freestyle and 100 m backstroke.

Bep is the younger sister of the former swimmer Jan Weeteling who also participated in the 1964 Olympics.
