= Anca Pătrășcoiu =

Romanian swimmer

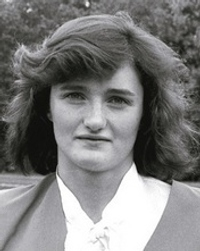

Personal information
- Nationality: Romanian
- Born: 17 October 1967 (age 58) Baia Mare, Romania
- Height: 179 cm (5 ft 10 in)
- Weight: 73 kg (161 lb)

Sport
- Sport: Swimming
- Club: Dinamo București
- Coach: Gheorghe Demeca; Cristina Balaban
Medal record
Representing Romania
Olympic Games
Bronze medal – third place	1984 Los Angeles	200 m backstroke
European Championships (LC)
Silver medal – second place	1987 Strasbourg	4×200 m freestyle
Summer Universiade
Gold medal – first place	1987 Zagreb	100 m backstroke
Gold medal – first place	1987 Zagreb	200 m backstroke
Silver medal – second place	1987 Zagreb	200 m butterfly
Silver medal – second place	1987 Zagreb	400 m medley

Aneta "Anca" Pătrășcoiu (born 17 October 1967) is a retired Romanian swimmer who won the bronze medal in the 200 meter backstroke event at the 1984 Summer Olympics. This was the first Olympic medal in Romanian swimming history. She retired in 1990 to become a swimming coach.
