= Lenka Maňhalová =

Czech swimmer (born 1974)

Personal information
- Full name: Lenka Maňhalová
- Nationality: Czech Republic
- Born: 28 October 1974 (age 51) Liberec, Czechoslovakia
- Height: 1.71 m (5 ft 7 1/2 in)
- Weight: 63 kg (139 lb)

Sport
- Sport: Swimming
- Strokes: Breaststroke and medley
- Club: Slávia OD Liberec
Medal record
Summer Universiade
Silver medal – second place	1995 Fukuoka	200 m medley
Bronze medal – third place	1997 Messina	200 m breaststroke
Bronze medal – third place	1997 Messina	200 m medley

Lenka Maňhalová (born 28 October 1974) is a Czech retired breaststroke and medley swimmer. She twice competed for the Czech Republic at the Olympic Games: in 1992 and 1996.
