= Fumie Kurotori =

Japanese swimmer (born 1975)

Personal information
- Born: August 6, 1975 (age 51)
Medal record
Women's swimming
Representing Japan
Pan Pacific Championships
| Gold medal – first place | 1995 Atlanta | 400m Medley |
Summer Universiade
| Gold medal – first place | 1995 Fukuoka | 200m Medley |
| Gold medal – first place | 1995 Fukuoka | 400m Medley |
| Gold medal – first place | 1997 Catania | 400m Medley |

Fumie Kurotori (黒鳥 文絵, Kurotori Fumie) (born August 6, 1975 in Funabashi, Chiba) is a retired female medley swimmer from Japan, who represented her native country at the 1996 Summer Olympics in Atlanta, Georgia. She is best known for winning two gold medals at the 1995 Summer Universiade in Fukuoka.
