= Cristina Balaban =

Romanian swimmer

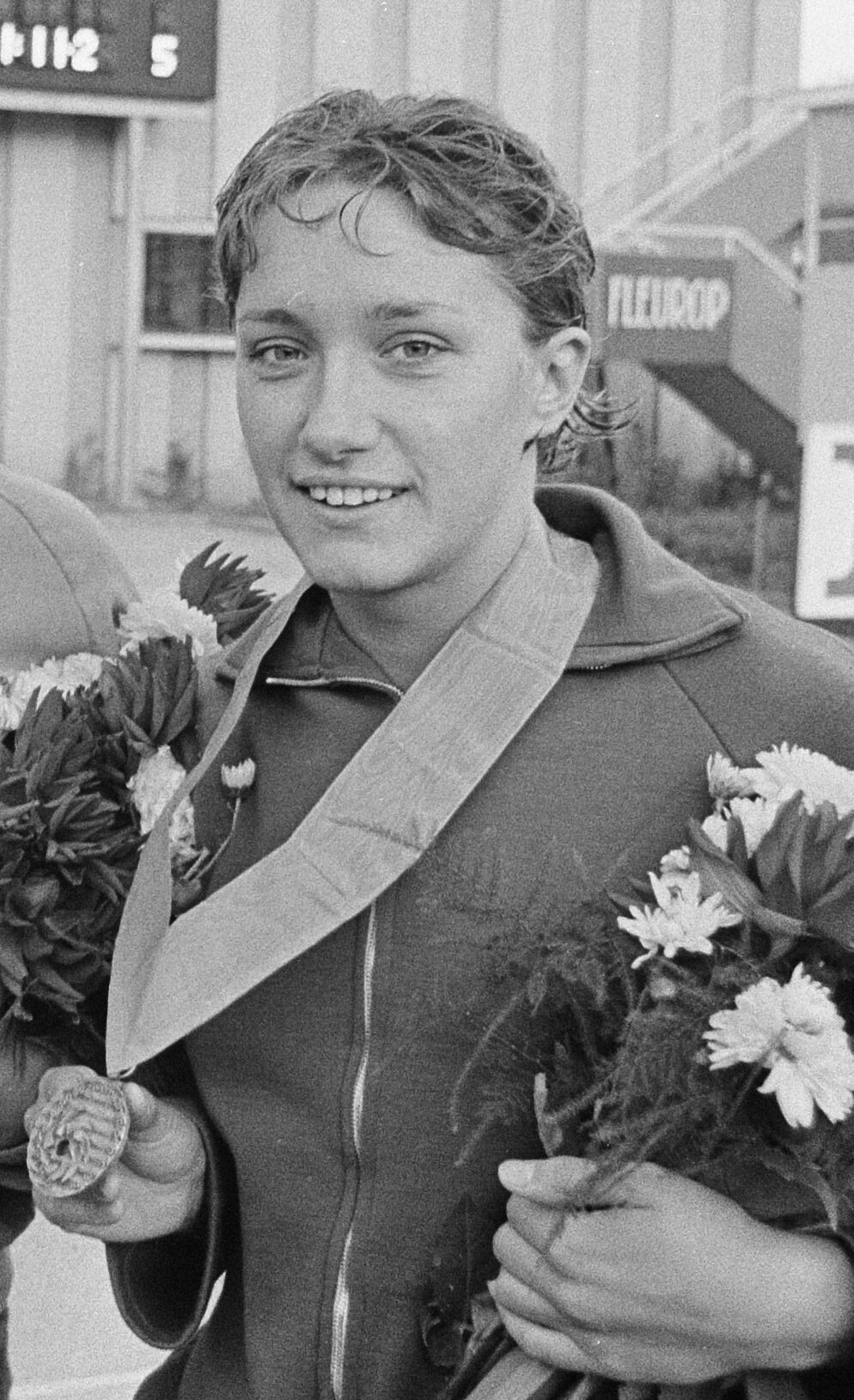
- Balaban at the 1966 European Championships

Sport
- Sport: Swimming
- Club: CS Dinamo București
Medal record
Representing Romania
European Championships
Bronze medal – third place	1966 Utrecht	100 m backstroke

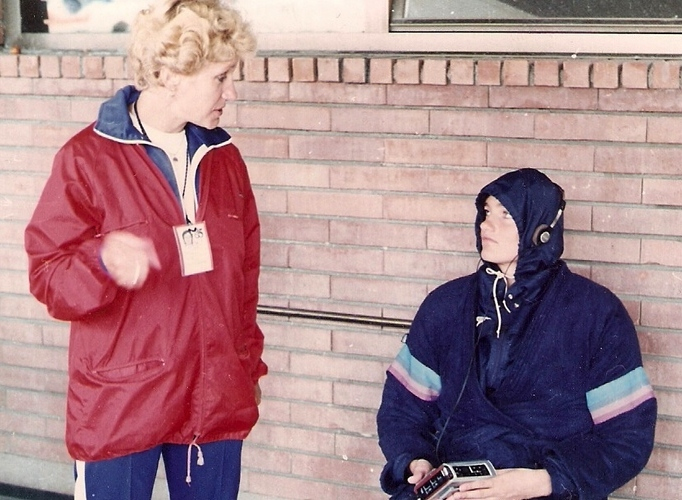
Balaban (left) and Pătrășcoiu at the 1985 European Championships

Cristina Balaban (born 1947) is a retired Romanian swimmer who won a bronze medal in the 100 m backstroke at the 1966 European Aquatics Championships. This was the first European swimming medal for Romania. During her career she won 28 national titles and set 36 national records.

After retirement she worked as a swimming coach, under the name Balaban-Sopterian, training such competitors as Carmen Bunaciu and Anca Pătrășcoiu.
