= List of flag bearers for Eswatini at the Olympics =

Eswatini at the Olympics
- IOC code: SWZ
- NOC: Swaziland Olympic and Commonwealth Games Association
- Website: www.socga.org.sz
- Medals: Gold 0 Silver 0 Bronze 0 Total 0

Summer appearances
- 1972; 1976–1980; 1984; 1988; 1992; 1996; 2000; 2004; 2008; 2012; 2016; 2020; 2024

Winter appearances
- 1992; 1994–2026

This is a list of flag bearers who have represented Eswatini at the Olympics.

Flag bearers carry the national flag of their country at the opening ceremony of the Olympic Games.

#	Event year	Season	Flag bearer	Sport
1	1972	Summer	Richard Mabuza	Athletics
2	1984	Summer	Lenford Dlamine	Official
3	1988	Summer	Sizwe Sydney Mdluli	Athletics
4	1992	Winter	Keith Fraser	Alpine Skiing
5	1996	Summer	Daniel Sibandze	Athletics
6	2000	Summer	Musa Simelane	Boxing
7	2004	Summer	Gcinile Moyane	Athletics
8	2008	Summer	Temalangeni Dlamini	Athletics
9	2012	Summer	Luke Hall	Swimming
10	2016	Summer	Sibusiso Matsenjwa	Athletics
11	2020	Summer	Thabiso Dlamini	Boxing
11	2020	Summer	Robyn Young	Swimming
12	2024	Summer	Hayley Hoy	Swimming
12	2024	Summer	Chadd Ng Chiu Hing Ning	Swimming

== See also ==
- Eswatini at the Olympics
