= Eswatini at the 2025 World Aquatics Championships =

- Flag of Eswatini
- World Aquatics code: SWZ
- National federation: Eswatini Swimming Association

in Singapore
- Competitors: 2 in 1 sport
- Medals: Gold 0 Silver 0 Bronze 0 Total 0

World Aquatics Championships appearances
- 1998; 2001; 2003; 2005; 2007; 2009; 2011; 2013; 2015; 2017; 2019; 2022; 2023; 2024; 2025

Eswatini is competing at the 2025 World Aquatics Championships in Singapore from 11 July to 3 August 2025.

== Competitors ==
The following is the list of competitors in the Championships.

Sport	Men	Women	Total
Swimming	1	1	2
Total	1	1	2

== Swimming ==
Men

Athlete	Event	Heat		Semifinal		Final	
Athlete	Event	Time	Rank	Time	Rank	Time	Rank
Chadd Ning	50 m breaststroke	31.62	72	Did not advance			
Chadd Ning	100 m breaststroke	1:11.58	71	Did not advance			

Women

Athlete	Event	Heat		Semifinal		Final	
Athlete	Event	Time	Rank	Time	Rank	Time	Rank
Siwakhile Dlamini	50 m freestyle	28.47	69	Did not advance			
Siwakhile Dlamini	100 m freestyle	1:03.87	70	Did not advance			
