= Eswatini at the 2020 Summer Olympics =

- IOC code: SWZ
- NOC: Eswatini Olympic and Commonwealth Games Association
- Website: www.socga.org.sz

in Tokyo July 23, 2021 – August 8, 2021
- Competitors: 4 in 3 sports
- Flag bearers (opening): Robyn Young; Thabiso Dlamini
- Flag bearer (closing): Sibusiso Matsenjwa
- Medals: Gold 0 Silver 0 Bronze 0 Total 0

Summer Olympics appearances (overview)
- 1972; 1976–1980; 1984; 1988; 1992; 1996; 2000; 2004; 2008; 2012; 2016; 2020; 2024

Eswatini competed at the 2020 Summer Olympics in Tokyo. Originally scheduled to take place from 24 July to 9 August 2020, the Games were postponed to 23 July to 8 August 2021, due to the COVID-19 pandemic. Previously known as Swaziland, it was the nation's eleventh appearance at the Summer Olympics since its debut in 1972. This was the first Games at which Eswatini competed under the name it assumed in 2018 (after previously competing as "Swaziland").

== Competitors ==
The following is the list of number of competitors in the Games.

Sport	Men	Women	Total
Athletics	1	0	1
Boxing	1	0	1
Swimming	1	1	2
Total	3	1	4

== Athletics ==
Eswatini received a universality slot from the World Athletics to send a male track and field athlete to the Olympics.

Key

- Note–Ranks given for track events are within the athlete's heat only
- Q = Qualified for the next round
- q = Qualified for the next round as a fastest loser or, in field events, by position without achieving the qualifying target
- NR = National record
- N/A = Round not applicable for the event
- Bye = Athlete not required to compete in round

Track & road events

Athlete	Event	Heat		Semifinal		Final	
Athlete	Event	Result	Rank	Result	Rank	Result	Rank
Sibusiso Matsenjwa	Men's 200 m	20.34 NR	2 Q	20.22 NR	5	Did not advance	

== Boxing ==
Eswatini received an invitation from the Tripartite Commission to send the men's welterweight boxer Thabiso Dlamini to the Olympics, marking the country's return to the sport for the first time since Sydney 2000.

Athlete	Event	Round of 32	Round of 16	Quarterfinals	Semifinals	Final	
Athlete	Event	Opposition Result	Opposition Result	Opposition Result	Opposition Result	Opposition Result	Rank
Thabiso Dlamini	Men's welterweight	Mengue (CMR); L RSC	Did not advance				

== Swimming ==
Eswatini received a universality invitation from FINA to send two top-ranked swimmers (one per gender) in their respective individual events to the Olympics, based on the FINA Points System of June 28, 2021.

Athlete	Event	Heat		Semifinal		Final	
Athlete	Event	Time	Rank	Time	Rank	Time	Rank
Simanga Dlamini	Men's 50 m freestyle	26.94	63	Did not advance			
Robyn Young	Women's 50 m freestyle	30.41	70	Did not advance			
