= Eswatini at the 2023 World Aquatics Championships =

- Flag of Eswatini
- World Aquatics code: SWZ
- National federation: Eswatini Swimming Association

in Fukuoka, Japan
- Competitors: 4 in 1 sport
- Medals: Gold 0 Silver 0 Bronze 0 Total 0

World Aquatics Championships appearances
- 1998; 2001; 2003; 2005; 2007; 2009; 2011; 2013; 2015; 2017; 2019; 2022; 2023; 2024; 2025

Eswatini competed at the 2023 World Aquatics Championships in Fukuoka, Japan from 14 to 30 July.

== Swimming ==
Eswatini entered 4 swimmers.

Men

Athlete	Event	Heat		Semifinal		Final	
Athlete	Event	Time	Rank	Time	Rank	Time	Rank
Simanga Dlamini	50 metre freestyle	27.84	106	Did not advance			
Simanga Dlamini	100 metre butterfly	1:04.50	71	Did not advance			
Chadd Ng Chiu Ning Ning	50 metre breaststroke	32.37	53	Did not advance			
Chadd Ng Chiu Ning Ning	100 metre breaststroke	1:10.80	66	Did not advance			

Women

Athlete	Event	Heat		Semifinal		Final	
Athlete	Event	Time	Rank	Time	Rank	Time	Rank
Siwakhile Dlamini	50 metre freestyle	30.78	87	Did not advance			
Siwakhile Dlamini	100 metre freestyle	1:07.78	70	Did not advance			
Hayley Hoy	50 metre butterfly	30.73	52	Did not advance			
Hayley Hoy	100 metre butterfly	1:09.14	46	Did not advance			
