= Swaziland at the 1988 Summer Olympics =

- IOC code: SWZ
- NOC: Swaziland Olympic and Commonwealth Games Association
- Website: www.socga.org.sz

in Seoul
- Competitors: 11 in 4 sports
- Flag bearer: Sizwe Sydney Mdluli
- Medals: Gold 0 Silver 0 Bronze 0 Total 0

Summer Olympics appearances (overview)
- 1972; 1976–1980; 1984; 1988; 1992; 1996; 2000; 2004; 2008; 2012; 2016; 2020; 2024

Swaziland competed at the 1988 Summer Olympics in Seoul, South Korea.

== Competitors ==
The following is the list of number of competitors in the Games.

Sport	Men	Women	Total
Athletics	5	0	5
Boxing	2	–	2
Swimming	2	0	2
Weightlifting	2	–	2
Total	11	0	11

== Athletics ==
=== Men ===
Track and road events

Athletes	Events	Heat Round 1		Quarterfinals		Semifinal		Final	
Athletes	Events	Time	Rank	Time	Rank	Time	Rank	Time	Rank
Vusie Dlamini	Marahon	—N/a						2:28.06	58
Samuel Hlawe	Marahon	—N/a						2:24.42	44
Frank Maziya	100 m	11.52	8	did not advance					
Gideon Mthembu	Marahon	—N/a						2:25.56	53

Field events

Athlete	Event	Qualification		Final	
Athlete	Event	Distance	Position	Distance	Position
Sizwe Sydney Mdluli	Triple jump	NM		did not advance	

== Boxing ==
=== Men ===
Athlete	Event	1 Round	2 Round	3 Round	Quarterfinals	Semifinals	Final	
Athlete	Event	Opposition Result	Opposition Result	Opposition Result	Opposition Result	Opposition Result	Opposition Result	Rank
Dumsane Mabuza	Featherweight	BYE	Richard Pittman (COK); L 1–4	did not advance				
Charles Mahlalela	Light Middleweight	BYE	Peter Silva (BRA); L 0–5	did not advance				

== Swimming ==
=== Men ===
Athlete	Event	Heat		Final B		Final	
Athlete	Event	Time	Rank	Time	Rank	Time	Rank
Yul Mark du Pont	50 m freestyle	27.93	69	did not advance			
Yul Mark du Pont	100 m freestyle	1:02.70	76	did not advance			
Yul Mark du Pont	100 m backstroke	1:12.50	52	did not advance			
Trevor Ncala	50 m freestyle	26.88	62	did not advance			
Trevor Ncala	100 m freestyle	59.25	74	did not advance			
Trevor Ncala	100 m butterfly	1:06.85	50	did not advance			

== Weightlifting ==
=== Men ===
Athlete	Event	Snatch		Clean & Jerk		Total	Rank
Athlete	Event	Result	Rank	Result	Rank	Total	Rank
Paul Hoffman (Note: also competed at the 1984 Summer Olympics)	75 kg	87.5	23	110.0	21	197.5	21
Absalom Shabangu	82.5 kg	~~80~~	DNF	—	—	—	DNF
