= Swaziland at the 1996 Summer Olympics =

- IOC code: SWZ
- NOC: Swaziland Olympic and Commonwealth Games Association
- Website: www.socga.org.sz

in Atlanta
- Competitors: 6 in 3 sports
- Flag bearer: Daniel Sibandze
- Medals: Gold 0 Silver 0 Bronze 0 Total 0

Summer Olympics appearances (overview)
- 1972; 1976–1980; 1984; 1988; 1992; 1996; 2000; 2004; 2008; 2012; 2016; 2020; 2024; 2028

Swaziland (known as Eswatini since 2018) competed at the 1996 Summer Olympics in Atlanta, United States.

== Competitors ==
This is the list of the number of competitors from the country at the Games.

Sport	Men	Women	Total
Athletics	4	0	4
Boxing	1	–	1
Swimming	0	1	1
Total	5	1	6

== Athletics ==
=== Men ===
Track and road events

Athletes	Events	Heat Round 1		Heat Round 2		Semifinal		Final	
Athletes	Events	Time	Rank	Time	Rank	Time	Rank	Time	Rank
Themba Makhanya	800 metres	1:59.02	55	—N/a		Did not advance			
Daniel Sibandze	Marathon	—N/a						2:28:49	78
Isaac Simelane	Marathon	—N/a						2:23:43	62

Field events

Athlete	Event	Qualification		Final	
Athlete	Event	Result	Rank	Result	Rank
Victor Shabangu	Long jump	6.79	43	Did not advance	

== Boxing ==
=== Men ===
Athlete	Event	Round of 32	Round of 16	Quarterfinal	Semifinal	Final
Athlete	Event	Opposition Result	Opposition Result	Opposition Result	Opposition Result	Opposition Result
Dan Mathunjawa	Middleweight	Plachetka (CZE); L 20-4	Did not advance			

== Swimming ==
=== Women ===
Athletes	Events	Heat		Finals	
Athletes	Events	Time	Rank	Time	Rank
Daniela Menegon	800 m freestyle	10:12.46	28	Did not advance	
