= List of Swazi records in swimming =

The Swazi records in swimming are the fastest ever performances of swimmers from Eswatini, which are recognised and ratified by the Eswatini National Swimming Association.

All records were set in finals unless noted otherwise.

== Long Course (50 m) ==
=== Men ===
Event	Time		Name	Club	Date	Meet	Location	Ref
50m freestyle	23.48	h	Luke Hall	Eswatini	2 August 2012	Olympic Games	London, Great Britain	
100m freestyle	52.45	h	Luke Hall	Eswatini	29 June 2011	World Championships	Shanghai, Japan	
200 m freestyle								
400 m freestyle								
800 m freestyle								
1500 m freestyle								
50 m backstroke								
100 m backstroke								
200 m backstroke								
50m breaststroke	30.24	sf	Wickus Nienaber	Eswatini	2 August 2002	Commonwealth Games	Manchester, Great Britain	
100m breaststroke	1:05.16	sf	Wickus Nienaber	Eswatini	31 July 2002	Commonwealth Games	Manchester, Great Britain	
200m breaststroke	2:25.72	h	Wickus Nienaber	Eswatini	4 August 2002	Commonwealth Games	Manchester, Great Britain	
50m butterfly	26.67	h	Luke Hall	Eswatini	5 October 2010	Commonwealth Games	New Delhi, India	
100m butterfly	58.55	h	Luke Hall	Eswatini	31 July 2009	World Championships	Rome, Italy	
200 m butterfly								
200 m individual medley								
400 m individual medley								
4×100 m freestyle relay								
4×200 m freestyle relay								
4×100 m medley relay								

Legend: # – Record awaiting ratification by Eswatini National Swimming Association; WR – World record; AF – African record;
Records not set in finals: h – heat; sf – semifinal; r – relay 1st leg; rh – relay heat 1st leg; b – B final; † – en route to final mark; so – swim-off; tt – time trial

=== Women ===
Event	Time		Name	Club	Date	Meet	Location	Ref
50 m freestyle	28.50		Kathryn Millin	Eswatini	19 August 2010	Youth Olympics	Singapore, Singapore	
100 m freestyle	1:02.78	h	Kathryn Millin	Eswatini	30 July 2009	World Championships	Rome, Italy	
200 m freestyle	2:18.87	h	Hayley Hoy	Eswatini	25 July 2026	Commonwealth Games	Glasgow, United Kingdom	
400 m freestyle	5:18.17		Hayley Hoy	Eswatini	16 April 2022	CANA Zone IV Championships	Zambia	
800 m freestyle	10:12.46	h	Daniela Menegon	Eswatini	25 July 1996	Olympic Games	Atlanta, United States	
1500 m freestyle								
50 m backstroke	32.34	h	Robyn Young	Eswatini	10 October 2018	Youth Olympics	Buenos Aires, Argentina	
100 m backstroke	1:13.97	h	Robyn Young	Eswatini	22 July 2019	World Championships	Gwangju, South Korea	
200 m backstroke	2:43.51		Hayley Hoy	Eswatini	16 April 2022	CANA Zone IV Championships	Zambia	
50 m breaststroke	36.96	h	Stacey Ryder	Eswatini	16 March 2006	Commonwealth Games	Melbourne, Australia	
100 m breaststroke	1:19.63	h	Stacey Ryder	Eswatini	19 March 2006	Commonwealth Games	Melbourne, Australia	
200 m breaststroke	3:11.52		Hayley Hoy	Eswatini	21 February 2020	CANA Zone IV Championships	Botswana	
50 m butterfly	29.79		Hayley Hoy	Eswatini	4 December 2022	African Union Region 5 Games	Zambia	
100 m butterfly	1:06.70	h	Lisa de la Motte	Eswatini	16 September 2023	Olympic Games	Sydney, Australia	
200 m butterfly	2:41.80		Hayley Hoy	Eswatini	16 April 2022	CANA Zone IV Championships	Zambia	
200 m individual medley	2:40.22		Hayley Hoy	Eswatini	16 April 2022	CANA Zone IV Championships	Zambia	
400 m individual medley								
4×100 m freestyle relay								
4×200 m freestyle relay								
4×100 m medley relay								

Legend: # – Record awaiting ratification by Eswatini National Swimming Association; WR – World record; AF – African record;
Records not set in finals: h – heat; sf – semifinal; r – relay 1st leg; rh – relay heat 1st leg; b – B final; † – en route to final mark; so – swim-off; tt – time trial

== Short Course (25 m) ==
=== Men ===
Event	Time		Name	Club	Date	Meet	Location	Ref
50m freestyle	24.59	h	Luke Hall	Eswatini	10 April 2008	World Championships	Manchester, Great Britain	
100m freestyle	53.47	h	Luke Hall	Eswatini	12 April 2008	World Championships	Manchester, Great Britain	
200 m freestyle								
400 m freestyle								
800 m freestyle								
1500 m freestyle								
50m backstroke	30.68	h	Mark Hoare	Eswatini	8 December 2016	World Championships	Windsor, Canada	
100 m backstroke								
200 m backstroke								
50 m breaststroke	37.09	h	Simphiwe Dlamini	Eswatini	10 December 2016	World Championships	Windsor, Canada	
100 m breaststroke	1:10.56		Luca Fraser	Eswatini	25 November 2023	Africa Aquatics Zone III Championships	Kigali, Rwanda	
200 m breaststroke								
50m butterfly	26.50	h	Luke Hall	Eswatini	11 April 2008	World Championships	Manchester, Great Britain	
100m butterfly	58.61	h	Luke Hall	Eswatini	9 April 2008	World Championships	Manchester, Great Britain	
200 m butterfly								
100m individual medley	1:00.74	h	Luke Hall	Eswatini	12 April 2008	World Championships	Manchester, Great Britain	
200m individual medley	2:11.02	h	Luke Hall	Eswatini	11 April 2008	World Championships	Manchester, Great Britain	
400 m individual medley								
4×50 m freestyle relay								
4×100 m freestyle relay								
4×200 m freestyle relay								
4×50 m medley relay								
4×100 m medley relay								

Legend: # – Record awaiting ratification by Eswatini National Swimming Association; WR – World record; AF – African record;
Records not set in finals: h – heat; sf – semifinal; r – relay 1st leg; rh – relay heat 1st leg; b – B final; † – en route to final mark; so – swim-off; tt – time trial

=== Women ===
Event	Time		Name	Club	Date	Meet	Location	Ref
50m freestyle	30.88	h	Senamile Dlamini	Eswatini	15 December 2018	World Championships	Hangzhou, China	
100m freestyle	1:08.54	h	Senamile Dlamini	Eswatini	12 December 2018	World Championships	Hangzhou, China	
200 m freestyle								
400 m freestyle								
800 m freestyle								
1500 m freestyle								
50m backstroke	33.96	h	Robyn Young	Eswatini	9 December 2016	World Championships	Windsor, Canada	
100m backstroke	1:16.25	h	Robyn Young	Eswatini	6 December 2016	World Championships	Windsor, Canada	
200m backstroke								
50m breaststroke	41.02	h	Lungelo Nxumalo	Eswatini	11 December 2018	World Championships	Hangzhou, China	
100m breaststroke	1:31.73	h	Lungelo Nxumalo	Eswatini	14 December 2018	World Championships	Hangzhou, China	
200 m breaststroke								
50 m butterfly								
100 m butterfly								
200 m butterfly								
100 m individual medley								
200 m individual medley								
400 m individual medley								
4×50 m freestyle relay								
4×100 m freestyle relay								
4×200 m freestyle relay								
4×50 m medley relay								
4×100 m medley relay								

Legend: # – Record awaiting ratification by Eswatini National Swimming Association; WR – World record; AF – African record;
Records not set in finals: h – heat; sf – semifinal; r – relay 1st leg; rh – relay heat 1st leg; b – B final; † – en route to final mark; so – swim-off; tt – time trial
