= Eswatini at the 2024 Summer Olympics =

- IOC code: SWZ
- NOC: Eswatini Olympic and Commonwealth Games Association
- Website: www.eocga.org.sz

in Paris, France 26 July 2024 – 11 August 2024
- Competitors: 3 (2 men and 1 woman) in 2 sports
- Flag bearer (opening): Chadd Ning & Hayley Hoy
- Flag bearer (closing): Sibusiso Matsenjwa
- Medals: Gold 0 Silver 0 Bronze 0 Total 0

Summer Olympics appearances (overview)
- 1972; 1976–1980; 1984; 1988; 1992; 1996; 2000; 2004; 2008; 2012; 2016; 2020; 2024

Eswatini competed at the 2024 Summer Olympics in Paris from 26 July to 11 August 2024. It was the nation's twelfth appearance at the Summer Olympics, having appeared at every Summer Games since 1972 except for 1976 (due to a Congolese-led boycott) and 1980 (as part of a US-led boycott).

== Competitors ==
The following is the list of number of competitors in the Games.

| Sport | Men | Women | Total |
|---|---|---|---|
| Athletics | 1 | 0 | 1 |
| Swimming | 1 | 1 | 2 |
| Total | 2 | 1 | 3 |

== Athletics ==
Eswatini sent one sprinter to compete at the 2024 Summer Olympics.

Key

- Note–Ranks given for track events are within the athlete's heat only
- Q = Qualified for the next round
- q = Qualified for the next round as a fastest loser or, in field events, by position without achieving the qualifying target
- NR = National record
- N/A = Round not applicable for the event
- Bye = Athlete not required to compete in round

Track events

| Athlete | Event | Preliminary | | Heat | | Semifinal | | Final | |
| Athlete | Event | Result | Rank | Result | Rank | Result | Rank | Result | Rank |
|---|---|---|---|---|---|---|---|---|---|
| Sibusiso Matsenjwa | Men's 100 m | 10.39 | 2 Q | 10.39 | 8 | Did not advance | | | |

== Swimming ==
Eswatini sent two swimmers to compete at the 2024 Paris Olympics.

| Athlete | Event | Heat | | Semifinal | | Final | |
| Athlete | Event | Time | Rank | Time | Rank | Time | Rank |
|---|---|---|---|---|---|---|---|
| Chadd Ning | Men's 100 m breaststroke | 1:09.85 | 35 | Did not advance | | | |
| Hayley Hoy | Women's 100 m butterfly | 1:08.36 | 31 | Did not advance | | | |
