= List of Swazi records in athletics =

The following are the national records in athletics in Eswatini (formerly Swaziland) maintained by Eswatini's national athletics federation: Athletics Eswatini (AE).

== Outdoor ==
Key to tables: Awaiting ratification Record not kept by SAA Not ratified or later rescinded by SAA

h = hand timing
A = affected by altitude
OT = oversized track (> 200m in circumference)

=== Men ===
Event	Record	Athlete	Date	Meet	Place	Ref.
100 m	10.31 (+1.4 m/s)	Sibusiso Matsenjwa	2 July 2017	Resisprint	La Chaux-de-Fonds, Switzerland	
100 m	10.31 A (+0.1 m/s)	Sibusiso Matsenjwa	13 April 2019	Athletics Grand Prix Series	Bloemfontein, South Africa	
100 m	10.22 (+0.3 m/s)	Sibusiso Matsenjwa	6 July 2018		Réduit, Mauritius	
150 m (bend)	16.70+ (+2.0 m/s)	Sibusiso Matsenjwa	5 August 2009		Berlin, Germany	
200 m	20.22 (+0.2 m/s)	Sibusiso Matsenjwa	3 August 2021	Olympic Games	Tokyo, Japan	
200 m	20.09 A (+1.5 m/s)	Sibusiso Matsenjwa	27 January 2018	League 2	Pretoria, South Africa	
400 m	46.36 A	Andile Lusenga	27 April 2019		Gaborone, Botswana	
800 m	1:46.54	Ndumiso Mdziniso	1 July 1997		Kristinestad, Finland	
1500 m	3:44.89	Sipho Dlamini	7 April 1995		Knoxville, United States	
3000 m	7:57.53	Sipho Dlamini	23 July 1994		Nivelles, Belgium	
5000 m	13:43.52	Sipho Dlamini	23 April 1994		Durban, South Africa	
10,000 m	29:19.71	Siphesihle Mdluli	26 July 2002	Commonwealth Games	Manchester, United Kingdom	
10 km (road)	29:16	Isaac Simelane	24 November 1990		Durban, South Africa	
15 km (road)	44:42	Isaac Simelane	2 November 1991		Cape Town, South Africa	
Half marathon	1:02:40	Isaac Simelane	21 July 1990		Durban, South Africa	
Marathon	2:12:54.4	Richard Mabuza	31 January 1974	British Commonwealth Games	Christchurch, New Zealand	
110 m hurdles						
400 m hurdles						
3000 m steeplechase						
High jump	2.02 m	Msebe Malinga	26 February 1999		Adelaide, Australia	
Pole vault						
Long jump	7.76 m	Victor Shabangu	23 November 1996		Germiston, South Africa	
Triple jump	16.18 m	Sizwe Mdluli	1 August 1992	Olympic Games	Barcelona, Spain	
Shot put	14.70 m	Dumisani Fakudze	6 November 2004		Mbabane, Swaziland	
Discus throw	43.89 m	Dumisani Fakudze	27 May 2007		Windhoek, Namibia	
Hammer throw	25.36 m	Dumisani Fakudze	1 July 2001		Harare, Zimbabwe	
Javelin throw	55.73 m	Mzwandile Mazibuko	28 April 2001		Lobamba, Swaziland	
Decathlon						
Decathlon	100m / Long jump / Shot put / High jump / 400m / 110m H / Discus / Pole vault / Javelin / 1500m					
20 km walk (road)						
50 km walk (road)						
4 × 100 m relay	39.75 A	Swaziland; Sibusiso Matsenjwa; Mlandvo Shongwe; Sebenele Dlamini; Thandaza Zwane	22 March 2017	Speed Series 4	Germiston, South Africa	
4 × 400 m relay	3:11.51 A	Swaziland; Manqoba Nyoni; Andile Lusenga; Mcebo Mkhaliphi; Thandaza Zwane	22 March 2017	Speed Series 4	Germiston, South Africa	

=== Women ===
Event	Record	Athlete	Date	Meet	Place	Ref.
100 m	11.35 (+0.2 m/s)	Phumlile Ndzinisa	29 May 2016	Meeting Elite	Forbach, France	
200 m	23.47 (−0.7 m/s)	Phumlile Ndzinisa	16 September 2015	African Games	Brazzaville, Republic of the Congo	
400 m	53.02	Phumlile Ndzinisa	14 September 2015	African Games	Brazzaville, Republic of the Congo	
800 m	2:11.48 A	Bongiwe Mndzebele	9 June 2002		Germiston, South Africa	
1500 m	4:35.64	Alphocinah Simelane	3 September 1987	World Championships	Rome, Italy	
3000 m	9:59.2	Dudu Simelane	10 June 2007		Maputo, Mozambique	
3000 m	9:41.8	Sanelisiwe Kunene Somhlolo	4 February 2006			
5000 m	17:30.04	Priscilla Mamba	22 September 2000	Olympic Games	Sydney, Australia	
10,000 m	36:46.75	Priscilla Mamba	17 September 1999	All-Africa Games	Johannesburg, South Africa	
Half marathon	1:24:06 A	Prudence Zwane	20 July 1996		Pretoria, South Africa	
Marathon	2:56:24	Priscilla Mamba	19 March 2005		Ngodwana, South Africa	
100 m hurdles						
400 m hurdles						
3000 m steeplechase						
High jump	1.80 m A	Erika Seyama	11 March 2017		Pretoria, South Africa	
Pole vault						
Long jump	5.56 m A	Portia Gimindza	17 April 2004		Mbabane, Swaziland	
Triple jump	10.60 m A	Gcebile Gumedze	2002		Mbabane, Swaziland	
Shot put	10.04 m	Khombisile Makhathu	9 April 1994		Simunye, Swaziland	
Discus throw	31.26 m	Ncedi Mngometulu	5 May 2007		Simunye, Swaziland	
Hammer throw						
Javelin throw	35.29 m	G. Mbali	5/6 May 2000		Bellville, South Africa	
Heptathlon						
Heptathlon	100m H / High jump / Shot put / 200m / Long jump / Javelin / 800m					
20 km walk (road)						
4 × 100 m relay	48.8 h A	Swaziland	30 May 2009		Gaborone, Botswana	
4 × 400 m relay	3:59.55 A	Swaziland	30 May 2004		Gaborone, Botswana	

== Indoor ==
=== Men ===
Event	Record	Athlete	Date	Meet	Place	Ref.
60 m	6.74	Sibusiso Matsenjwa	1 March 2024	World Championships	Glasgow, United Kingdom	
200 m	22.57	Menzi Dlamini	5 March 1999	World Championships	Maebashi, Japan	
400 m						
800 m	1:49.19 OT	Ozzie Mdziniso	7 March 1998		Ames, United States	
1500 m						
3000 m	8:09.99	Sipho Dlamini	10 March 1995	World Championships	Barcelona, Spain	
60 m hurdles						
High jump						
Pole vault						
Long jump	7.07 m	Sizwe Mdluli	8 March 1991	World Championships	Seville, Spain	
Triple jump						
Shot put						
Heptathlon						
Heptathlon	60m / Long jump / Shot put / High jump / 60m H / Pole vault / 1000m					
5000 m walk						
4 × 400 m relay						

=== Women ===
Event	Record	Athlete	Date	Meet	Place	Ref.
60 m						
200 m	28.19	Hazel Mthetfwa	9 March 2001	World Championships	Lisbon, Portugal	
400 m						
800 m						
1500 m						
3000 m						
60 m hurdles						
High jump						
Pole vault						
Long jump						
Triple jump						
Shot put						
Pentathlon						
Pentathlon	60m H / High jump / Shot put / Long jump / 800m					
3000 m walk						
4 × 400 m relay						
