= Swaziland at the 1984 Summer Olympics =

- IOC code: SWZ
- NOC: Swaziland Olympic and Commonwealth Games Association
- Website: www.socga.org.sz

in Los Angeles
- Competitors: 8 in 4 sports
- Flag bearer: Lenford Dlamine
- Medals: Gold 0 Silver 0 Bronze 0 Total 0

Summer Olympics appearances (overview)
- 1972; 1976–1980; 1984; 1988; 1992; 1996; 2000; 2004; 2008; 2012; 2016; 2020; 2024

Swaziland competed at the 1984 Summer Olympics in Los Angeles, United States. The nation returned to the Olympic Games after boycotting both the 1976 and the 1980 Games.

== Athletics ==
=== Men ===
Track and road events

Athletes	Events	Heat Round 1		Quarterfinals		Semifinal		Final	
Athletes	Events	Time	Rank	Time	Rank	Time	Rank	Time	Rank
Vusie Dlamini	800 m	DSQ		did not advance					
Samuel Hlawe	Marathon	—N/a						2:22:45	45
Clifford Sibusiso Mamba	100 m	11.24	8	did not advance					
Clifford Sibusiso Mamba	200 m	22.76	8	did not advance					

== Boxing ==
=== Men ===
Athlete	Event	1 Round	2 Round	3 Round	Quarterfinals	Semifinals	Final	
Athlete	Event	Opposition Result	Opposition Result	Opposition Result	Opposition Result	Opposition Result	Opposition Result	Rank
Leonard Makhanya	Flyweight	Pat Clinton (GBR); L 0-5	did not advance	—N/a	did not advance			
Jonathan Magagula	Featherweight	BYE	Kevin Taylor (GBR); L 0-5	did not advance				
Bhutana Magwaza	Light Welterweight	BYE	Roshdy Armanios (EGY); L RSC-2	did not advance				

== Swimming ==
=== Men ===
Athlete	Event	Heat		Semifinal		Final	
Athlete	Event	Time	Rank	Time	Rank	Time	Rank
Trevor Ncala	100 m freestyle	58.22	62	did not advance			
Trevor Ncala	200 m freestyle	2:15.30	53	did not advance			
Trevor Ncala	100 m butterfly	1:06.94	50	did not advance			

== Weightlifting ==
=== Men ===
Athlete	Event	Snatch		Clean & Jerk		Total	Rank
Athlete	Event	Result	Rank	Result	Rank	Total	Rank
Paul Hoffman (Note: also competed at the 1988 Summer Olympics)	75 kg	72.5	21	102.5	19	175.0	19
