= Eswatini at the 2019 World Aquatics Championships =

- Flag of Eswatini
- FINA code: SWZ
- National federation: Eswatini Swimming Association

in Gwangju, South Korea
- Competitors: 3 in 1 sport
- Medals: Gold 0 Silver 0 Bronze 0 Total 0

World Aquatics Championships appearances
- 1998; 2001; 2003; 2005; 2007; 2009; 2011; 2013; 2015; 2017; 2019; 2022; 2023; 2024

Eswatini competed at the 2019 World Aquatics Championships in Gwangju, South Korea from 12 to 28 July.

== Swimming ==
Eswatini entered three swimmers.

Men

Athlete	Event	Heat		Semifinal		Final	
Athlete	Event	Time	Rank	Time	Rank	Time	Rank
Simanga Dlamini	50 m butterfly	28.64	79	did not advance			
Simanga Dlamini	100 m butterfly	1:02.39	75	did not advance			
Mark Hoare	50 m freestyle	25.76	108	did not advance			
Mark Hoare	100 m freestyle	59.27	111	did not advance			

Women

Athlete	Event	Heat		Semifinal		Final	
Athlete	Event	Time	Rank	Time	Rank	Time	Rank
Robyn Young	50 m backstroke	33.54	39	did not advance			
Robyn Young	100 m backstroke	1:13.97	59	did not advance			
