= Swaziland at the 1992 Winter Olympics =

Eswatini at the 1992 Winter Olympics
- IOC code: SWZ
- NOC: Swaziland Olympic and Commonwealth Games Association
- Website: www.socga.org.sz

in Albertville
- Competitors: 1 (man) in 1 sport
- Flag bearer: Keith Fraser
- Medals: Gold 0 Silver 0 Bronze 0 Total 0

Winter Olympics appearances (overview)
- 1992; 1994–2026

Swaziland competed in the Winter Olympic Games for the first time (as for 2026, the only time) at the 1992 Winter Olympics in Albertville, France from 8–23 February 1992. The Swazi delegation consisted of a single competitor, the alpine skier Keith Fraser, who competed in the slalom, where he failed to finish the first run; in the giant slalom, where he came 63rd; and in the super-G, finishing 79th.

== Background ==
The Swaziland Olympic and Commonwealth Games Association was recognized by the International Olympic Committee on 1 January 1972. Swaziland first sent a delegation to the Summer Olympic Games at the 1972 Summer Olympics, and these Albertville Games were their first, and of 2018, only appearance at a Winter Olympic Games. The 1992 Winter Olympics were held from 8–23 February 1992, a total of 1,801 athletes representing 64 National Olympic Committees took part. The only competitor sent to Albertville by Swaziland was alpine skier Keith Fraser. He was chosen as the flag-bearer for the opening ceremony.

== Competitors ==
The following is the list of number of competitors in the Games.

Sport	Men	Women	Total
Alpine skiing	1	0	1
Total	1	0	1

== Alpine skiing ==
Keith Fraser was 24 years old at the time of the Albertville Olympics. Making his only Olympic appearance, he was entered into three events. On 16 February he took part in the Super-G, finishing the single-run race in 1 minute and 29.39 seconds, which put him in 79th place out of 93 classified finishers. The gold medal was won by Kjetil André Aamodt of Norway in a time of 1 minute and 13.04 seconds, the silver medal by Marc Girardelli of Luxembourg, and the bronze by Jan Einar Thorsen, also of Norway.

The giant slalom was held on 18 February and was held over two legs, with the total of both runs determining each competitor's final time. Fraser finished the first leg in 1 minute and 21.93 seconds, which put him in 78th place, out of 112 competitors who finished the first run. He finished the second run in a faster time of 1 minute and 19.83 seconds, which was 63rd position for that run. His total time for the event was therefore 2 minutes and 41.76 seconds, which put Fraser in 63rd place out of 91 competitors who finished both legs. The gold medal was won by Italian Alberto Tomba in a time of 2 minutes and 6.98 seconds. The silver medal was won by Girardelli of Luxembourg, and the bronze by the Norwegian Aamodt.

The slalom race was held on 22 February, and Fraser failed to finish the first leg of the two-leg race. The gold medal was won by Norwegian Finn Christian Jagge, the silver by Tomba, and the bronze by Michael Tritscher of Austria.

Athlete	Event	Race 1	Race 2	Total	
Athlete	Event	Time	Time	Time	Rank
Keith Fraser	Men's super-G			1:29.39	79
Keith Fraser	Men's giant slalom	1:21.93	1:19.83	2:41.76	63
Keith Fraser	Men's slalom	DNF	–	DNF	–

== See also ==
- Swaziland at the 1992 Summer Olympics
