= Eswatini at the 2024 World Aquatics Championships =

- Flag of Eswatini
- World Aquatics code: SWZ
- National federation: Eswatini Swimming Association

in Doha, Qatar
- Competitors: 2 in 1 sport
- Medals: Gold 0 Silver 0 Bronze 0 Total 0

World Aquatics Championships appearances
- 1998; 2001; 2003; 2005; 2007; 2009; 2011; 2013; 2015; 2017; 2019; 2022; 2023; 2024; 2025

Eswatini competed at the 2024 World Aquatics Championships in Doha, Qatar from 2 to 18 February.

== Competitors ==
The following is the list of competitors in the Championships.

Sport	Men	Women	Total
Swimming	1	1	2
Total	1	1	2

== Swimming ==
Eswatini entered 2 swimmers.

Men

Athlete	Event	Heat		Semifinal		Final	
Athlete	Event	Time	Rank	Time	Rank	Time	Rank
Chadd Ning	50 metre breaststroke	31.53	48	Did not advance			
Chadd Ning	100 metre breaststroke	1:10.55	69	Did not advance			

Women

Athlete	Event	Heat		Semifinal		Final	
Athlete	Event	Time	Rank	Time	Rank	Time	Rank
Siwakhile Dlamini	50 metre freestyle	29.66	82	Did not advance			
Siwakhile Dlamini	100 metre freestyle	1:06.32	75	Did not advance			
