= 2016 FINA World Swimming Championships (25 m) – Women's 50 metre backstroke =

Women's 50 metre backstroke at the 2016 FINA World Swimming Championships (25 m)
- Venue: WFCU Centre
- Dates: 9 December (heats and semifinals); 10 December (final)
- Competitors: 81 from 61 nations
- Winning time: 25.82

Medalists
gold medal	Etiene Medeiros	Brazil
silver medal	Katinka Hosszú	Hungary
bronze medal	Ali DeLoof	United States

The Women's 50 metre backstroke competition of the 2016 FINA World Swimming Championships (25 m) was held on 9 and 10 December 2016.

== Records ==
Prior to the competition, the existing world and championship records were as follows.

	Name	Nation	Time	Location	Date
World record Championship record	Etiene Medeiros	Brazil	25.67	Doha	7 December 2014

== Results ==
=== Heats ===
The heats were held at 09:44.

Rank	Heat	Lane	Name	Nationality	Time	Notes
1	9	0	Ali DeLoof	United States	26.25	Q
2	8	4	Emily Seebohm	Australia	26.43	Q
3	7	4	Etiene Medeiros	Brazil	26.48	Q
4	8	6	Kylie Masse	Canada	26.57	Q, NR
5	8	5	Daryna Zevina	Ukraine	26.63	Q
5	8	7	Kira Toussaint	Netherlands	26.63	Q
7	9	4	Katinka Hosszú	Hungary	26.70	Q
8	9	5	Georgia Davies	Great Britain	26.74	Q
9	7	3	Mie Nielsen	Denmark	26.75	Q
10	6	2	Isabella Arcila	Colombia	26.76	Q, NR
11	9	3	Mariia Kameneva	Russia	26.82	Q
12	8	2	Kathleen Dawson	Great Britain	26.84	Q
13	7	5	Maaike de Waard	Netherlands	26.87	Q
14	7	6	Simona Baumrtová	Czech Republic	26.93	Q
15	7	1	Silvia Di Pietro	Italy	26.95	Q
16	9	7	Wang Xueer	China	27.01	Q
17	7	7	Andrea Berrino	Argentina	27.03	NR
18	8	3	Minna Atherton	Australia	27.14	
19	9	2	Liu Xiang	China	27.20	
20	7	2	Emi Moronuki	Japan	27.22	
21	9	6	Mélanie Henique	France	27.37	
22	7	9	Eygló Gústafsdóttir	Iceland	27.44	
23	6	6	Clara Smiddy	United States	27.47	
23	9	1	Silvia Scalia	Italy	27.47	
25	9	8	Julie Kepp Jensen	Denmark	27.51	
26	8	1	Mathilde Cini	France	27.71	
27	8	0	Ida Lindborg	Sweden	27.77	
28	6	5	Hilary Caldwell	Canada	27.80	
28	8	8	Caroline Pilhatsch	Austria	27.80	
30	6	8	Tayla Lovemore	South Africa	27.82	
31	6	0	Naomi Ruele	Botswana	27.94	NR
32	6	4	Mariella Venter	South Africa	27.95	
33	7	0	Miki Takahashi	Japan	28.01	
34	6	7	Wong Toto Kwan To	Hong Kong	28.05	
34	7	8	Hanna Rosvall	Sweden	28.05	
36	6	3	Karolína Hájková	Slovakia	28.59	
36	6	9	Lushavel Stickland	Samoa	28.59	NR
38	5	2	Amel Melih	Algeria	28.62	NR
39	5	5	Natthanan Junkrajang	Thailand	28.76	
40	4	4	Celina Marquez	El Salvador	28.81	NR
40	5	0	Ugne Mazutaityte	Lithuania	28.81	
42	4	2	Lauren Hew	Cayman Islands	28.86	NR
43	5	9	Kimiko Raheem	Sri Lanka	28.89	NR
44	4	5	Caylee Watson	United States Virgin Islands	28.92	NR
45	5	4	Hanna-Maria Seppälä	Finland	29.07	
46	5	3	Maana Patel	India	29.19	NR
47	5	7	Sylvia Brunlehner	Kenya	29.20	NR
48	6	1	Alexus Laird	Seychelles	29.39	
49	4	3	Hoong En Qi	Singapore	29.72	
50	4	7	Jade Howard	Zambia	29.79	NR
51	5	1	Karen Vilorio	Honduras	29.81	NR
52	5	8	Gabriela Ņikitina	Lithuania	29.98	
53	4	6	Mónica Ramírez	Andorra	30.17	
54	1	7	Anastasia Bogdanovski	Macedonia	30.22	NR
55	4	9	Maria Arrua	Paraguay	30.50	
56	3	5	Jennifer Rizkallah	Lebanon	30.60	
57	3	6	Izzy Joachim	Saint Vincent and the Grenadines	30.73	NR
58	3	2	Jamaris Washshah	United States Virgin Islands	30.83	
59	4	0	Danielle Titus	Barbados	30.86	
60	4	1	Estellah Fils Rabetsara	Madagascar	30.96	NR
61	3	4	Alma Castillo	Paraguay	31.01	
62	2	1	Colleen Furgeson	Marshall Islands	31.13	NR
63	3	3	Alison Jackson	Cayman Islands	31.25	
64	2	6	Lea Ricart Martinez	Andorra	31.74	
65	3	0	Bisma Khan	Pakistan	31.91	
66	3	1	Shanice Paraka	Papua New Guinea	32.22	
67	2	5	Gabriela Hernandez	Nicaragua	32.28	
68	2	7	Sonia Tumiotto	Tanzania	32.44	NR
69	3	7	Rahaf Baqleh	Jordan	32.49	
70	2	3	Tiareth Cijntje	Curaçao	32.57	NR
71	3	9	Flaka Pruthi	Kosovo	32.66	
72	2	4	Gabby Gittens	Antigua and Barbuda	32.78	NR
73	2	8	Annie Hepler	Marshall Islands	32.92	
74	3	8	Alesia Neziri	Albania	33.37	NR
75	2	2	Dara Al-Bakry	Jordan	33.67	
76	1	6	Robyn Young	Eswatini	33.96	NR
77	2	0	Ammara Pinto	Malawi	34.03	
78	2	9	Aishath Sausan	Maldives	34.29	NR
79	1	4	Tilali Scanlan	American Samoa	34.70	NR
80	1	5	Tayamika Chang'anamuno	Malawi	38.34	
81	1	2	Calina Panuve	Tonga	40.06	
	1	3	Kokoe Vanessa Ahyee	Ivory Coast		DNS
	4	8	Cheyenne Rova	Fiji		DNS
	5	6	Felicity Passon	Seychelles		DNS
	8	9	Yekaterina Rudenko	Kazakhstan		DNS
	9	9	Fanny Teijonsalo	Finland		DNS

=== Semifinals ===
The semifinals were held at 19:43.

==== Semifinal 1 ====
Rank	Lane	Name	Nationality	Time	Notes
1	4	Emily Seebohm	Australia	26.33	Q
2	5	Kylie Masse	Canada	26.34	Q, NR
3	7	Kathleen Dawson	Great Britain	26.44	Q
4	3	Kira Toussaint	Netherlands	26.52	
4	6	Georgia Davies	Great Britain	26.52	
6	2	Isabella Arcila	Colombia	26.72	NR
7	1	Simona Baumrtová	Czech Republic	26.90	
8	8	Wang Xueer	China	27.20	

==== Semifinal 2 ====
Rank	Lane	Name	Nationality	Time	Notes
1	5	Etiene Medeiros	Brazil	26.00	Q
2	4	Ali DeLoof	United States	26.12	Q
3	7	Mariia Kameneva	Russia	26.29	Q
4	6	Katinka Hosszú	Hungary	26.37	Q
5	3	Daryna Zevina	Ukraine	26.45	Q
6	2	Mie Nielsen	Denmark	26.65	
7	1	Maaike de Waard	Netherlands	26.70	
8	8	Silvia Di Pietro	Italy	27.21	

=== Final ===
The final was held at 19:38.

Rank	Lane	Name	Nationality	Time	Notes
1st place, gold medalist(s)	4	Etiene Medeiros	Brazil	25.82	
2nd place, silver medalist(s)	7	Katinka Hosszú	Hungary	25.99	
3rd place, bronze medalist(s)	5	Ali DeLoof	United States	26.14	
4	3	Mariia Kameneva	Russia	26.15	NR
5	6	Emily Seebohm	Australia	26.16	
6	8	Daryna Zevina	Ukraine	26.40	
7	1	Kathleen Dawson	Great Britain	26.42	
8	2	Kylie Masse	Canada	26.46	
