= Swaziland at the 2008 Summer Olympics =

- IOC code: SWZ
- NOC: Swaziland Olympic and Commonwealth Games Association
- Website: www.socga.org.sz

in Beijing
- Competitors: 4 in 2 sports
- Flag bearer: Temalangeni Dlamini
- Medals: Gold 0 Silver 0 Bronze 0 Total 0

Summer Olympics appearances (overview)
- 1972; 1976–1980; 1984; 1988; 1992; 1996; 2000; 2004; 2008; 2012; 2016; 2020; 2024

Swaziland sent a delegation to compete at the 2008 Summer Olympics held in Beijing, People's Republic of China from August 8–24, 2008. This was the Kingdom's eighth appearance at a Summer Olympic Games. The Swazi delegation to Beijing consisted of four competitors, two track and field athletes; Isaiah Msibi and Temalangeni Dlamini; and two swimmers; Luke Hall and Senele Dlamini. None of the four advanced beyond the first round of their respective events.

== Background ==
The Swaziland Olympic and Commonwealth Games Association was recognized by the International Olympic Committee on 1 January 1972. Swaziland first sent a delegation to the Summer Olympic Games at the 1972 Summer Olympics. They did not send a delegation in 1976, and participated in the United States-led boycott of the 1980 Summer Olympics; but have participated in every Summer Olympics since the 1984 Los Angeles Olympics. This made Beijing Swaziland's eighth appearance at a Summer Olympiad. The 2008 Summer Olympics were held from 8–24 August 2008; a total of 10,942 athletes represented 204 National Olympic Committees. The Swazi delegation to Beijing consisted of four competitors, two track and field athletes; Isaiah Msibi and Temalangeni Dlamini; and two swimmers; Luke Hall and Senele Dlamini. Temalangeni Dlamini was chosen as the flag-bearer for the opening ceremony, while Hall was selected to do the same at the closing ceremony.

== Athletics ==
Temalangeni Dlamini was 21 years old at the time of the Beijing Olympics and was making her debut in Olympic competition. On 16 August, she participated in the heats of the women's 400 meters, and was drawn into heat seven. She finished her heat in a time of 59.91 seconds, seventh and last in her heat, over nine seconds behind the heat's winner, Shericka Williams of Jamaica, and was eliminated from the competition. The gold medal was eventually won by Christine Ohuruogu of Great Britain in 49.62 seconds, the silver by Williams, and the bronze medal was taken by Sanya Richards-Ross of the United States.

Isaiah Msibi was 24 years old at the time, and likewise making his first Olympic appearance. On 15 August, he took part in the men's 1500 meters and finished the first round race in 3 minutes and 51.35 seconds, 12th in his heat, and was eliminated from the competition. The gold medal was eventually won in 3 minutes and 33.11 seconds by Asbel Kiprop of Morocco, the silver by Nick Willis of New Zealand, and the bronze was won by France's Mehdi Baala.

Athlete	Event	Heat		Semifinal		Final	
Athlete	Event	Result	Rank	Result	Rank	Result	Rank
Temalangeni Dlamini	Women's 400 m	59.91	7	did not advance			
Isaiah Msibi	Men's 1500 m	3:51.35	12	did not advance			

- Note–Ranks given for track events are within the athlete's heat only

== Swimming ==
Luke Hall was 19 years old at the time of the Beijing Olympics, and would later go on to represent Swaziland again four years later in the 2012 London Olympics. On 14 August, he took part in the first round of the men's 50 meter freestyle, a race he finished in 24.41 seconds, good for 60th place out of 97 athletes, and he was eliminated as only the top 16 advanced to the semifinals. The gold medal was won by César Cielo of Brazil in 21.30 seconds, the silver and bronze medals were both won by Frenchmen, the silver by Amaury Leveaux and the bronze by Alain Bernard. Four years later, in the same event, Hall came in 36th place.

Senele Dlamini was 16 years old at the time of these Olympics, and was making her Olympic debut. She finished the first round of the women's 50 meter freestyle in 28.70 seconds, which was 61st place out of 90 competitors. Similarly to the men's race, only the top 16 could advance to the semifinals, and Dlamini was eliminated from the competition. The gold medal was eventually won in the finals in 24.06 seconds by Britta Steffen of Germany, the silver medal was earned by Dara Torres of the United States, and the bronze medal was taken by Cate Campbell of Australia.

Athlete	Event	Heat		Semifinal		Final	
Athlete	Event	Time	Rank	Time	Rank	Time	Rank
Luke Hall	Men's 50 m freestyle	24.41	60	did not advance			
Senele Dlamini	Women's 50 m freestyle	28.70	61	did not advance			
