= Eswatini at the 2022 World Aquatics Championships =

- Flag of Eswatini
- FINA code: SWZ
- National federation: Eswatini Swimming Association

in Budapest, Hungary
- Competitors: 2 in 1 sport
- Medals: Gold 0 Silver 0 Bronze 0 Total 0

World Aquatics Championships appearances
- 1998; 2001; 2003; 2005; 2007; 2009; 2011; 2013; 2015; 2017; 2019; 2022; 2023; 2024

Eswatini competed at the 2022 World Aquatics Championships in Budapest, Hungary from 18 June to 3 July.

== Swimming ==
Swazi swimmers have achieved qualifying standards in the following events.

Athlete	Event	Heat		Semifinal		Final	
Athlete	Event	Time	Rank	Time	Rank	Time	Rank
Simanga Dlamini	Men's 50 m butterfly	29.25	67	did not advance			
Simanga Dlamini	Men's 100 m butterfly	1:04.46	65	did not advance			
Hayley Hoy	Women's 50 m butterfly	30.99	53	did not advance			
Hayley Hoy	Women's 100 m butterfly	1:10.15	28	did not advance			
