= Swaziland at the 2017 World Aquatics Championships =

Eswatini at the 2017 World Aquatics Championships
- Flag of Swaziland
- FINA code: SWZ
- National federation: Swaziland National Swimming Federation

in Budapest, Hungary
- Competitors: 3 in 1 sport
- Medals: Gold 0 Silver 0 Bronze 0 Total 0

World Aquatics Championships appearances
- 1998; 2001; 2003; 2005; 2007; 2009; 2011; 2013; 2015; 2017; 2019; 2022; 2023; 2024

Swaziland competed at the 2017 World Aquatics Championships in Budapest, Hungary from 14 July to 30 July.

== Swimming ==
Swaziland has received a Universality invitation from FINA to send three swimmers (two men and one woman) to the World Championships.

Athlete	Event	Heat		Semifinal		Final	
Athlete	Event	Time	Rank	Time	Rank	Time	Rank
Simanga Dlamini	Men's 50 m breaststroke	33.07	73	did not advance			
Simanga Dlamini	Men's 100 m butterfly	1:04.02	70	did not advance			
Mark Hoare	Men's 50 m freestyle	25.86	101	did not advance			
Mark Hoare	Men's 100 m freestyle	57.38	99	did not advance			
Robyn Young	Women's 50 m backstroke	35.46	60	did not advance			
Robyn Young	Women's 100 m backstroke	1:16.34	57	did not advance			
