= Swaziland at the 2012 Summer Olympics =

- IOC code: SWZ
- NOC: Swaziland Olympic and Commonwealth Games Association
- Website: www.socga.org.sz

in London
- Competitors: 3 in 2 sports
- Flag bearers: Luke Hall (opening); Sibusiso Matsenjwa (closing)
- Medals: Gold 0 Silver 0 Bronze 0 Total 0

Summer Olympics appearances (overview)
- 1972; 1976–1980; 1984; 1988; 1992; 1996; 2000; 2004; 2008; 2012; 2016; 2020; 2024

Swaziland competed at the 2012 Summer Olympics in London, which was held from 27 July to 12 August 2012. The country's participation at London marked its ninth appearance in the Summer Olympics since its debut at the 1972 Summer Olympics. The delegation included two track and field athletes: Sibusiso Matsenjwa and Phumlile Ndzinisa, and one swimmer, Luke Hall; the first two competitors qualified for the Games through wildcard places while Hall was awarded a universality place by FINA. Hall was selected as the flag bearer for the opening ceremony and Matensjwa held it for the closing ceremony. All three competitors did not advance further than the heat stages of their respective events.

== Background ==
Swaziland participated in nine Summer Olympic Games between its début at the 1972 Summer Olympics in Munich, Germany and the 2012 Summer Olympics in London, England, with the exception of the 1976 Summer Olympics in Montreal and the 1980 Summer Olympics in the Soviet Union, the former because of a boycott relating to the New Zealand national rugby union team touring South Africa, and the latter because the country joined the United States-led boycott over the 1979 invasion of Afghanistan during the Soviet–Afghan War. No Swazi athlete has ever won a medal at the Olympic Games and the country has yet to debut at the Winter Olympic Games. Swaziland participated in the London Summer Olympics from 27 July to 12 August 2012. The nation sent athletes Sibusiso Matsenjwa and Phumlile Ndzinisa and swimmer Luke Hall to the Games. Hall was the flag bearer for the opening ceremony and Matensjwa held it for the closing ceremony. The athletes were coached by Muzi Mabuza and Linda Kiefer, and trained in the West Devon town of Tavistock.

== Athletics ==
The 2012 Summer Games marked Sibusiso Matsenjwa's Olympic début. He was oldest competitor for Swaziland at the Games, aged 24. He qualified for the Olympics via a wildcard, as his best time, 21.29 seconds set at the 2011 World Championships in Athletics, was 0.64 seconds slower than the "B" qualifying standard for his event, the men's 200 metres. In an interview with the Times of Swaziland before competing Matsenjwa said that he was learning from training with other Olympic athletes and was confident of improving his performance. Matsenjwa competed in the men's 200 metres race in the third heat of the first round on 7 August, finishing sixth out of eight athletes with a time of 20.93 seconds, setting a new Swaziland national record. Overall he finished 40th out of 53 athletes, (Note: One athlete, Alonso Edward, was disqualified, and another Ben Youssef Meité did not start.) and was 0.21 seconds slower than the slowest qualifier for the semi-finals and, therefore, that was the end of his competition.

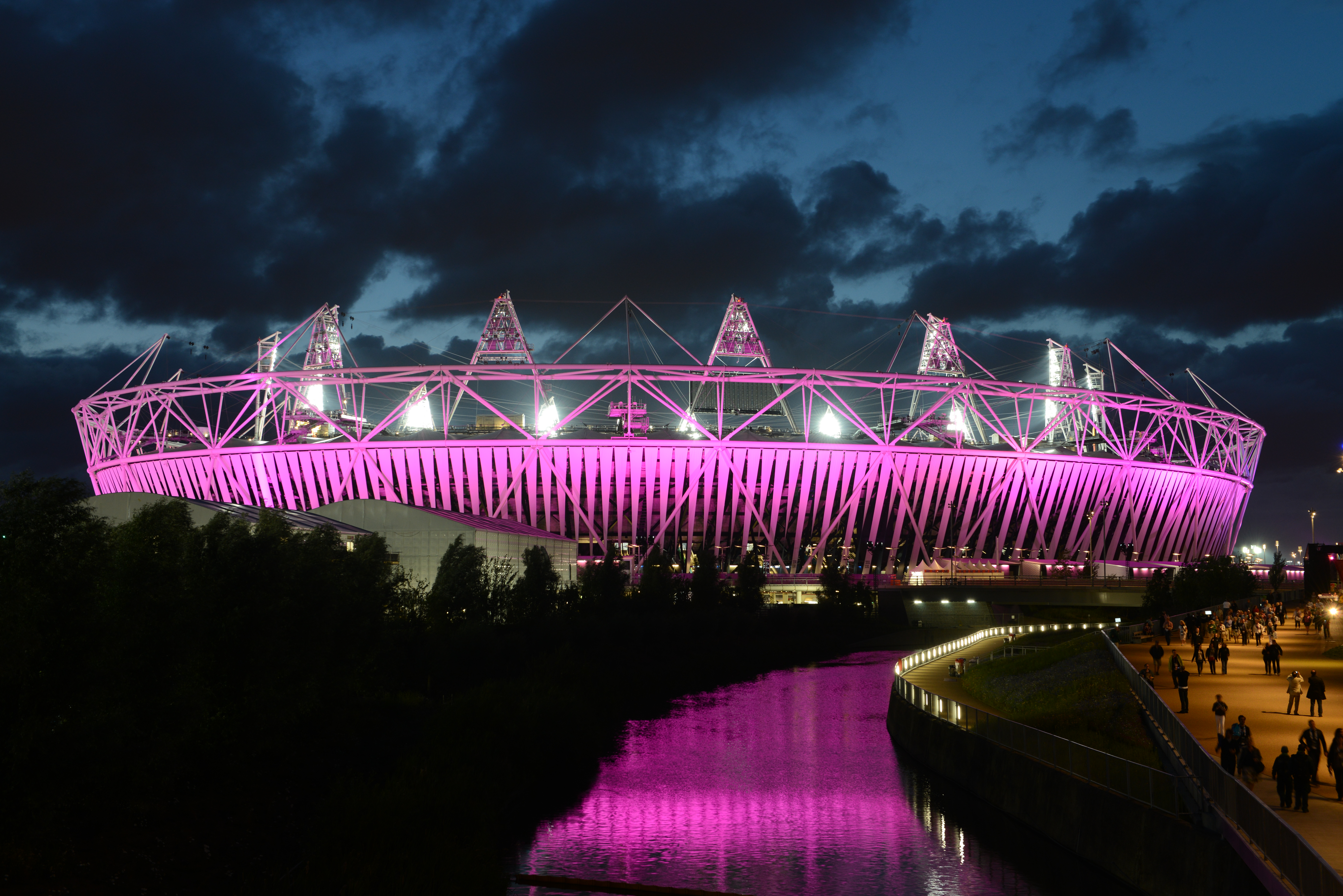
The London Olympic Stadium, where Matsenjwa and Ndzinisa competed in track and field events

Competing at her first Olympics, Phumlile Ndzinisa was notable for carrying the Swaziland flag at the closing ceremony. She was the youngest person to compete for Swaziland at the Games, aged 19. She qualified for the Olympics via a wildcard, as her best time, 54.26 seconds set at the 2011 All-Africa Games, was 1.96 seconds slower than the "B" qualifying standard for the women's 400 metres. Ndzinisa took part in the first round of the women's 400 metres and was drawn in the fourth heat. She finished sixth with a time of 53.95 seconds, behind heat winner and eventual gold medallist Sanya Richards-Ross of the United States (51.78 seconds). Ndzinisa finished 36th out of 45 athletes overall, (Note: Three athletes were not classified, and one was disqualified.) and was 1.64 seconds behind the slowest qualifier who progressed to the semi-finals and that was the end of her competition.

Key

- Note–Ranks given for track events are within the athlete's heat only
- Q = Qualified for the next round
- q = Qualified for the next round as a fastest loser or, in field events, by position without achieving the qualifying target
- NR = National record

Men

Athlete	Event	Heat		Semifinal		Final	
Athlete	Event	Result	Rank	Result	Rank	Result	Rank
Sibusiso Matsenjwa	200 m	20.93 NR	6	Did not advance			

Women

Athlete	Event	Heat		Semifinal		Final	
Athlete	Event	Result	Rank	Result	Rank	Result	Rank
Phumlile Ndzinisa	400 m	53.95	6	Did not advance			

== Swimming ==
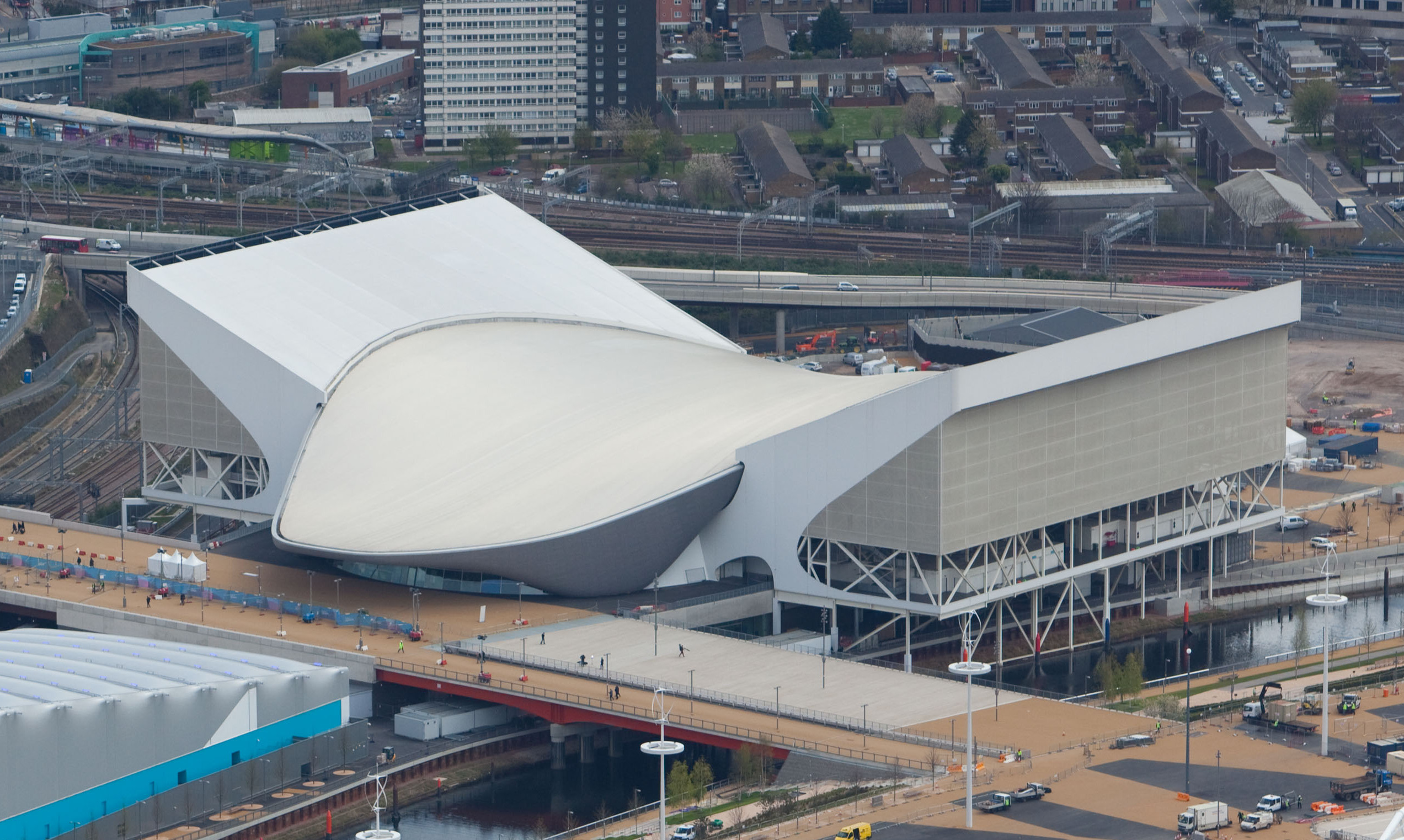
The London Aquatics Centre where Hall competed in the men's 50 metre freestyle event

Luke Hall, who at the age of 23 was participating in his second Olympic Games, was notable for holding the flag of Swaziland at the opening ceremony. He qualified after receiving a universality place by FINA as his best time of 23.92 seconds did not reach the "A" or "B" standard entry times. Hall was drawn in heat four of the men's 50 metre freestyle event which was held on 2 August, finishing fourth out of eight swimmers with a time of 23:48 seconds. He finished 36th out of 58 swimmers overall and finished 1.21 seconds slower than the slowest swimmer to progress to the next round and he was eliminated from the competition.

Men

Athlete	Event	Heat		Semifinal		Final	
Athlete	Event	Time	Rank	Time	Rank	Time	Rank
Luke Hall	50 m freestyle	23.48	36	Did not advance			
