= 2016 FINA World Swimming Championships (25 m) – Women's 100 metre backstroke =

Sporting event

Women's 100 metre backstroke at the 2016 FINA World Swimming Championships (25 m)
- Venue: WFCU Centre
- Dates: 6 December (heats and semifinals); 7 December (final)
- Competitors: 71 from 54 nations
- Winning time: 55.54

Medalists
gold medal	Katinka Hosszú	Hungary
silver medal	Kylie Masse	Canada
bronze medal	Georgia Davies	Great Britain

The Women's 100 metre backstroke competition of the 2016 FINA World Swimming Championships (25 m) was held on 6 and 7 December 2016.

== Records ==
Prior to the competition, the existing world and championship records were as follows.

	Name	Nation	Time	Location	Date
World record Championship record	Katinka Hosszú	Hungary	55.03	Doha	4 December 2014

== Results ==
=== Heats ===
The heats were held at 12:37.

Rank	Heat	Lane	Name	Nationality	Time	Notes
1	7	5	Kylie Masse	Canada	56.02	Q, NR
2	8	4	Katinka Hosszú	Hungary	56.16	Q
3	6	1	Ali DeLoof	United States	56.40	Q
4	8	5	Emily Seebohm	Australia	56.60	Q
5	6	5	Georgia Davies	Great Britain	56.99	Q
6	8	1	Kathleen Dawson	Great Britain	57.17	Q
7	7	4	Mie Nielsen	Denmark	57.36	Q
8	6	4	Daryna Zevina	Ukraine	57.41	Q
9	5	3	Hellen Moffitt	United States	57.43	Q
10	7	7	Kira Toussaint	Netherlands	57.50	Q
11	8	3	Minna Atherton	Australia	57.63	Q
12	6	3	Emi Moronuki	Japan	57.74	Q
13	7	3	Simona Baumrtová	Czech Republic	57.79	Q
14	6	7	Andrea Berrino	Argentina	57.88	Q, NR
15	6	6	Chen Jie	China	57.90	Q
16	8	6	Sayaka Akase	Japan	58.08	Q
17	8	7	Mariia Kameneva	Russia	58.09	
18	7	0	Hilary Caldwell	Canada	58.16	
19	5	4	Isabella Arcila	Colombia	58.30	NR
20	7	6	Eygló Gústafsdóttir	Iceland	58.49	
21	6	2	Silvia Scalia	Italy	58.52	
22	7	1	Wang Xueer	China	58.53	
23	8	2	Daria Ustinova	Russia	58.67	
24	7	2	Maaike de Waard	Netherlands	58.78	
25	8	0	Mariella Venter	South Africa	59.66	
26	6	8	Hanna Rosvall	Sweden	59.71	
27	4	3	Ugnė Mažutaitytė	Lithuania	59.76	NR
27	8	9	Caroline Pilhatsch	Austria	59.76	
29	7	8	Ida Lindborg	Sweden	59.77	
30	6	0	Sarah Bro	Denmark	59.88	
31	5	5	Matea Samardžić	Croatia	59.90	
32	6	9	Karin Tomečková	Slovakia	1:00.25	
33	8	8	Mathilde Cini	France	1:00.27	
34	5	7	Wong Toto Kwan To	Hong Kong	1:00.36	
35	5	2	Kristina Steina	Latvia	1:00.60	NR
35	5	6	Karolína Hájková	Slovakia	1:00.60	
37	4	7	Tatiana Salcutan	Moldova	1:00.68	NR
38	5	8	Lushavel Stickland	Samoa	1:01.19	NR
39	7	9	Fanny Teijonsalo	Finland	1:01.27	
40	5	1	Gabi Grobler	South Africa	1:01.96	
41	5	9	Amel Melih	Algeria	1:02.03	NR
42	4	1	Inés Remersaro	Uruguay	1:02.50	
43	4	5	Caylee Watson	United States Virgin Islands	1:02.53	
44	4	6	Kimiko Raheem	Sri Lanka	1:02.70	NR
45	3	6	Celina Marquez	El Salvador	1:02.79	
46	3	4	Lauren Hew	Cayman Islands	1:03.35	NR
47	5	0	Natthanan Junkrajang	Thailand	1:03.36	
48	4	4	Alexus Laird	Seychelles	1:03.60	
49	3	3	Anastasia Bogdanovski	Macedonia	1:03.94	NR
50	4	8	Maana Patel	India	1:04.33	NR
51	4	2	Jade Howard	Zambia	1:04.35	NR
52	3	5	Danielle Titus	Barbados	1:04.82	NR
53	4	0	Maria Arrua	Paraguay	1:05.13	NR
54	4	9	Mónica Ramírez	Andorra	1:05.33	
55	3	0	Maeform Borriello	Honduras	1:05.71	NR
56	2	2	Alma Castillo	Paraguay	1:06.04	
57	3	7	Lea Ricart Martinez	Andorra	1:06.58	
58	3	2	Britheny Joassaint	Haiti	1:06.96	
59	3	8	Alison Jackson	Cayman Islands	1:07.30	
60	2	4	Enkhkhuslen Batbayar	Mongolia	1:08.24	NR
61	2	3	Tiareth Cijntje	Curaçao	1:08.50	NR
62	2	1	Colleen Furgeson	Marshall Islands	1:09.39	NR
63	3	1	Rahaf Baqleh	Jordan	1:10.03	
64	2	6	Gabby Gittens	Antigua and Barbuda	1:12.02	NR
65	2	7	Shanice Paraka	Papua New Guinea	1:12.55	
66	1	4	Osisang Chilton	Palau	1:13.67	NR
67	2	9	Ammara Pinto	Malawi	1:15.35	NR
68	2	8	Ruthie Long	Marshall Islands	1:15.47	
69	1	5	Aishath Sausan	Maldives	1:15.76	NR
70	1	6	Robyn Young	Eswatini	1:16.25	NR
71	1	3	Angel de Jesus	Northern Mariana Islands	1:20.90	
	2	5	Dara Al-Bakry	Jordan		DNS
	3	9	Jamaris Washshah	United States Virgin Islands		DNS

=== Semifinals ===
The semifinals were held at 19:44.

==== Semifinal 1 ====
Rank	Lane	Name	Nationality	Time	Notes
1	5	Emily Seebohm	Australia	56.44	Q
2	4	Katinka Hosszú	Hungary	56.74	Q
3	3	Kathleen Dawson	Great Britain	57.03	Q
4	6	Daryna Zevina	Ukraine	57.07	Q
5	7	Emi Moronuki	Japan	57.23	
6	2	Kira Toussaint	Netherlands	57.73	
7	8	Sayaka Akase	Japan	57.85	
8	1	Andrea Berrino	Argentina	58.48	

==== Semifinal 2 ====
Rank	Lane	Name	Nationality	Time	Notes
1	4	Kylie Masse	Canada	56.19	Q
2	3	Georgia Davies	Great Britain	56.69	Q
3	5	Ali DeLoof	United States	56.70	Q
4	6	Mie Nielsen	Denmark	56.96	Q
5	2	Hellen Moffitt	United States	57.22	
6	1	Simona Baumrtová	Czech Republic	57.68	
7	8	Chen Jie	China	57.86	
8	7	Minna Atherton	Australia	57.99	

=== Final ===
The final was held at 20:01.

Rank	Lane	Name	Nationality	Time	Notes
1st place, gold medalist(s)	2	Katinka Hosszú	Hungary	55.54	
2nd place, silver medalist(s)	4	Kylie Masse	Canada	56.24	
3rd place, bronze medalist(s)	3	Georgia Davies	Great Britain	56.45	
4	5	Emily Seebohm	Australia	56.46	
5	1	Kathleen Dawson	Great Britain	56.73	
6	6	Ali DeLoof	United States	56.80	
7	7	Mie Nielsen	Denmark	56.93	
8	8	Daryna Zevina	Ukraine	57.28	
