= Swaziland at the 1972 Summer Olympics =

- IOC code: SWZ
- NOC: Swaziland Olympic and Commonwealth Games Association
- Website: www.socga.org.sz

in Munich
- Competitors: 2 in 2 sports
- Flag bearer: Richard Mabuza
- Medals: Gold 0 Silver 0 Bronze 0 Total 0

Summer Olympics appearances (overview)
- 1972; 1976–1980; 1984; 1988; 1992; 1996; 2000; 2004; 2008; 2012; 2016; 2020; 2024

Swaziland competed in the Summer Olympic Games for the first time at the 1972 Summer Olympics in Munich, West Germany. Two competitors, both male, took part in four events in two sports.

== Athletics ==
=== Men ===
Athlete	Event	Heat		Quarterfinal		Semifinal		Final	
Athlete	Event	Result	Rank	Result	Rank	Result	Rank	Result	Rank
Richard Mabuza	10,000 m	DNF		—N/a				did not advance	
Richard Mabuza	Marathon	—N/a						2:20:39	17

== Shooting ==
=== Open ===
Athlete	Event	Final	
Athlete	Event	Score	Rank
Philip Serjeant	Trap	122	57
Philip Serjeant	Skeet	DNS	
