= Swaziland at the 2011 World Aquatics Championships =

Eswatini at the 2011 World Aquatics Championships
- Flag of Swaziland
- FINA code: SWZ
- National federation: Swaziland National Swimming Federation

in Shanghai, China
- Competitors: 1 in 1 sport
- Medals: Gold 0 Silver 0 Bronze 0 Total 0

World Aquatics Championships appearances
- 1998; 2001; 2003; 2005; 2007; 2009; 2011; 2013; 2015; 2017; 2019; 2022; 2023; 2024

Swaziland competed at the 2011 World Aquatics Championships in Shanghai, China between July 16 and 31, 2011.

== Swimming ==
Swaziland qualified 1 swimmer.

Men

Athlete	Event	Heats		Semifinals		Final	
Athlete	Event	Time	Rank	Time	Rank	Time	Rank
Luke Hall	Men's 50m Freestyle	23.92	45	did not advance			
Luke Hall	Men's 100m Freestyle	52.45	57	did not advance			
