= Swaziland at the 2016 Summer Olympics =

- IOC code: SWZ
- NOC: Swaziland Olympic and Commonwealth Games Association
- Website: www.socga.org.sz

in Rio de Janeiro
- Competitors: 2 in 1 sport
- Flag bearer: Sibusiso Matsenjwa
- Medals: Gold 0 Silver 0 Bronze 0 Total 0

Summer Olympics appearances (overview)
- 1972; 1976–1980; 1984; 1988; 1992; 1996; 2000; 2004; 2008; 2012; 2016; 2020; 2024

Swaziland competed at the 2016 Summer Olympics in Rio de Janeiro, Brazil, from 5 to 21 August 2016. The country's participation in Rio de Janeiro marked its tenth appearance at the Summer Olympics since its debut in 1972. The delegation included two track and field athletes: Sibusiso Matsenjwa in the men's 200 metres and Phumlile Ndzinisa in the women's 100 metres. Both athletes participated at the Games through wildcard places since they did not meet the required standards to qualify. Neither athletes progressed past their heats, although Matsenjwa set a new national record.

== Background ==
Swaziland participated in ten Summer Olympics between its debut in the 1972 Summer Olympics in Munich, West Germany, and the 2016 Summer Olympics in Rio de Janeiro, Brazil. The only occasions in that period which they did not attend was at the 1976 Summer Olympics in Montreal, Quebec, Canada, and the 1980 Summer Olympics in Moscow, Soviet Union. On both occasions, it was because they had joined with international boycotts of the events. The first boycott was because of the inclusion of the New Zealand team at the Games despite the breach of the international sports boycott of South Africa by the nation's rugby union team shortly prior. In 1980, Swaziland joined with the United States led boycott over the 1979 invasion of Afghanistan during the Soviet–Afghan War. The highest number of Swazis participating at any one Games was 11 at the 1988 Summer Games in Seoul, South Korea. No Swazi has ever won a medal at an Olympics.

The Swaziland Olympic and Commonwealth Games Association selected two athletes using wildcard slots. A National Olympic Committee was able to enter up to three qualified athletes in each individual event at the 2016 Games as long as each athlete met the "A" standard, or one athlete per event if they met the "B" standard. However, since Swaziland had no athletes that met either standard, they were allowed to select two athletes, one of each gender, as wildcards. Swaziland was one of several countries who sent a delegation of two athletes in 2016, with only Tuvalu sending a single competitor.

The Swazi team at the 2016 Games featured two track and field athletes returning from the 2012 Summer Olympics in London, United Kingdom: sprinters Phumlile Ndzinisa in the women's 100 metres and Sibusiso Matsenjwa in the men's 200 metres. The duo was announced by the Swaziland Olympic and Commonwealth Games Association Vice President Adam Mthethwa on 6 July 2016, and they would be accompanied by manager Thoba Mazibuko and physiotherapist Machawe Mamba. Mthethwa said "We are hopeful that the two will perform at their level best and they can break the national records and improve their personal best times". Matsenjwa was selected to carry the nation's flag during the Parade of Nations in the opening ceremony.

== Athletics ==
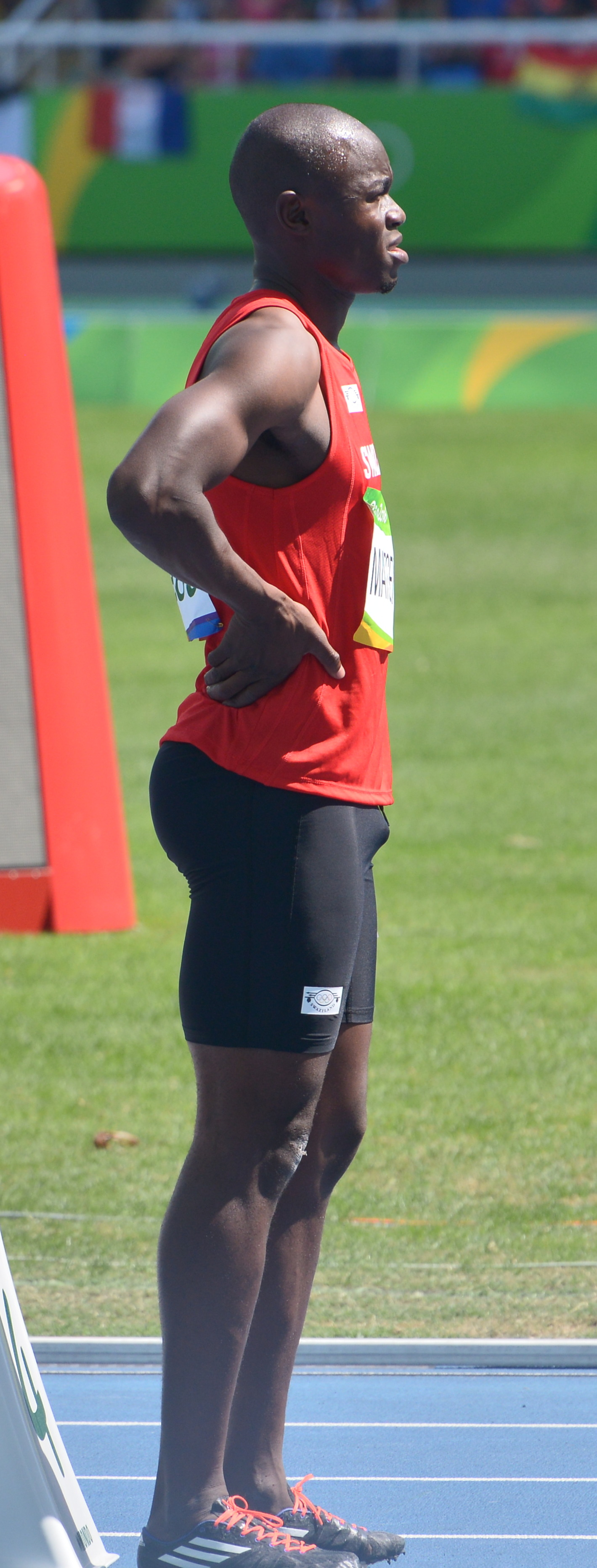
Sibusiso "Swazibolt" Matsenjwa lines up for the 200 metres at the 2016 Summer Olympics

Swaziland was represented by one male athlete at the 2016 Games in athletics – Sibusiso Matsenjwa, nicknamed the "Swazibolt". It marked his second appearance at an Olympic Games, after previously competing for Swaziland at the 2012 Games. In his first appearance, he finished sixth within his heat of the men's 200 metres and was eliminated from the competition. He qualified for the 2016 using a wildcard spot, since his personal best time of 20.78 was 0.28 seconds slower than the "B" qualifying standard. At the 2016 Games, Matsenjwa competed on 16 August in the third heat. He placed sixth, with a new national record of 20.63 seconds. He finished ahead of Levi Cadogan of Barbados (21.02 seconds) and Ghana's Tega Odele (21.25 seconds), and was 0.44 seconds behind the winner of the heat, Salem Eid Yaqoob of Bahrain. Only the first two athletes progressed to the next round, and so it marked the only performance by Matsenjwa.

The country's sole female athlete at the 2016 Games was Phumlile Ndzinisa, in the 100 metres. Previously at the 2012 Games, she had competed in the fourth heat, finishing in fifth position. She also qualified for the 2016 Games using a wildcard spot, since her personal best time for the 100 metres of 11.35 seconds was 0.03 seconds slower than the "B" qualifying standard. At the 2016 Games, Ndzinisa competed on 12 August in the second heat, finishing fifth, with a time of 12.49 seconds. She was ahead of Taina Halasima of Tonga (12.8 seconds), Laenly Phoutthavong of Laos (12.82 seconds) and Lerissa Henry of Micronesia (13.53 seconds), but was 0.4 seconds behind Sunayna Wahi of Suriname, who won the heat. Since she failed to finish in the first two places, Ndzinisa's Olympics finished with that single run.

Key

- Note–Ranks given for track events are within the athlete's heat only
- Q = Qualified for the next round
- q = Qualified for the next round as a fastest loser or, in field events, by position without achieving the qualifying target
- NR = National record
- N/A = Round not applicable for the event
- Bye = Athlete not required to compete in round

Track events

Athlete	Event	Heat		Quarterfinal		Semifinal		Final	
Athlete	Event	Result	Rank	Result	Rank	Result	Rank	Result	Rank
Sibusiso Matsenjwa	Men's 200 m	20.63 NR	6	—N/a		Did not advance			
Phumlile Ndzinisa	Women's 100 m	12.49	5	Did not advance					
