= Swaziland at the 2004 Summer Olympics =

- IOC code: SWZ
- NOC: Swaziland Olympic and Commonwealth Games Association
- Website: www.socga.org.sz

in Athens
- Competitors: 3 in 2 sports
- Flag bearer: Gcinile Moyane
- Medals: Gold 0 Silver 0 Bronze 0 Total 0

Summer Olympics appearances (overview)
- 1972; 1976–1980; 1984; 1988; 1992; 1996; 2000; 2004; 2008; 2012; 2016; 2020; 2024

Swaziland competed at the 2004 Summer Olympics in Athens, Greece, from 13 to 29 August 2004.

== Athletics ==
Swazi athletes have so far achieved qualifying standards in the following athletics events (up to a maximum of 3 athletes in each event at the 'A' Standard, and 1 at the 'B' Standard).

Men

Athlete	Event	Heat		Quarterfinal		Semifinal		Final	
Athlete	Event	Result	Rank	Result	Rank	Result	Rank	Result	Rank
Mphelave Dlamini	200 m	21.82	7	did not advance					

Women

Athlete	Event	Heat		Quarterfinal		Semifinal		Final	
Athlete	Event	Result	Rank	Result	Rank	Result	Rank	Result	Rank
Gcinile Moyane	200 m	25.62 NR	6	did not advance					

Key

- Note–Ranks given for track events are within the athlete's heat only
- Q = Qualified for the next round
- q = Qualified for the next round as a fastest loser or, in field events, by position without achieving the qualifying target
- NR = National record
- N/A = Round not applicable for the event
- Bye = Athlete not required to compete in round

== Swimming ==
Men

Athlete	Event	Heat		Semifinal		Final	
Athlete	Event	Time	Rank	Time	Rank	Time	Rank
Wickus Nienaber	100 m breaststroke	1:04.74	42	did not advance			
