= Swaziland at the 2015 World Aquatics Championships =

Eswatini at the 2015 World Aquatics Championships
- Flag of Swaziland
- FINA code: SWZ
- National federation: Swaziland National Swimming Federation

in Kazan, Russia
- Competitors: 2 in 1 sport
- Medals: Gold 0 Silver 0 Bronze 0 Total 0

World Aquatics Championships appearances
- 1998; 2001; 2003; 2005; 2007; 2009; 2011; 2013; 2015; 2017; 2019; 2022; 2023; 2024

Swaziland competed at the 2015 World Aquatics Championships in Kazan, Russia from 24 July to 9 August 2015.

== Swimming ==
Swazi swimmers have achieved qualifying standards in the following events (up to a maximum of 2 swimmers in each event at the A-standard entry time, and 1 at the B-standard):

Men

Athlete	Event	Heat		Semifinal		Final	
Athlete	Event	Time	Rank	Time	Rank	Time	Rank
Simanga Dlamini	100 m breaststroke	DNS		did not advance			
Simanga Dlamini	200 m breaststroke	2:45.73	52	did not advance			
Mark Hoare	100 m freestyle	59.62	106	did not advance			
Mark Hoare	100 m butterfly	1:04.76	71	did not advance			
