= Swaziland at the 1992 Summer Olympics =

- IOC code: SWZ
- NOC: Swaziland Olympic and Commonwealth Games Association
- Website: www.socga.org.sz

in Barcelona
- Competitors: 6 men in 2 sports
- Flag bearer: Isaac Simelane
- Medals: Gold 0 Silver 0 Bronze 0 Total 0

Summer Olympics appearances (overview)
- 1972; 1976–1980; 1984; 1988; 1992; 1996; 2000; 2004; 2008; 2012; 2016; 2020; 2024

Swaziland was represented at the 1992 Summer Olympics in Barcelona, Catalonia, Spain by the Swaziland Olympic and Commonwealth Games Association.

In total, six athletes – all men – represented Swaziland in two different sports including athletics and boxing.

== Competitors ==
In total, six athletes represented Swaziland at the 1992 Summer Olympics in Barcelona, Catalonia, Spain across two different sports.

Sport	Men	Women	Total
Athletics	5	0	5
Boxing	1	–	1
Total	6	0	6

== Athletics ==
In total, five Swazi athletes participated in the athletics events – Elphas Sadebo Gimindaza in the men's marahon, Sizwe Sydney Mdluli in the men's long jump and the men's triple jump, Isaac Simelane in the men's 5,000 m and the men's 10,000 m, Sipho Dlamini in the men's 800 m and the men's 1,500 m and Robinson Stewart in the men's 100 m and the men's 200 m.

The heats for the men's 100 m took place on 31 July 1992. Stewart finished eighth in his heat in a time of 11.2 seconds and he did not advance to the quarter-finals.

The heats for the men's 10,000 m took place on 31 July 1992. Simelane finished 20th in his heat in a time of 29 minutes 48.49 seconds and he did not advance to the final.

The heats for the men's 800 m took place on 1 August 1992. Dlamini finished third in his heat in a time of one minute 48.7 seconds which was ultimately not fast enough to advance to the semi-finals.

The heats for the men's 200 m took place on 3 August 1992. Stewart finished sixth in his heat in a time of 21.97 seconds and he did not advance to the quarter-finals.

The heats for the men's 1,500 m took place on 3 August 1992. Dlamini finished eighth in his heat in a time of three minutes 46.33 seconds and he did not advance to the semi-finals.

The heats for the men's 5,000 m took place on 6 August 1992. Simelane finished eighth in his heat in a time of 14 minutes 0.44 seconds and he did not advance to the final.

The men's marathon took place on 9 August 1992. Gimindaza completed the course in a time of two hours 21 minutes 15 seconds to finish 42nd overall.

Athletes	Events	Heat round 1		Quarter-finals		Semi-final		Final	
Athletes	Events	Time	Rank	Time	Rank	Time	Rank	Time	Rank
Sipho Dlamini	800 m	1:48.70	3	—N/a		did not advance			
Sipho Dlamini	1,500 m	3:46.33	8	—N/a		did not advance			
Elphas Sadebo Gimindaza	Marahon	—N/a						2:21.15	42
Isaac Simelane	5,000 m	14:00.44	9	—N/a				did not advance	
Isaac Simelane	10,000 m	9:48.49	20	—N/a				did not advance	
Robinson Stewart	100 m	11.20	8	did not advance					
Robinson Stewart	200 m			did not advance					

The qualifying round for the men's triple jump took place on 1 August 1992. Mdlui contested qualifying group A. His best jump of 16.18 m was not enough to advance to the final and he finished 27th overall.

The qualifying round for the men's long jump took place on 5 August 1992. Mdlui contested qualifying group B. He had three fouls on his three attempts and was listed as no mark.

Athlete	Event	Qualification		Final	
Athlete	Event	Distance	Position	Distance	Position
Sizwe Sydney Mdluli	Long jump	NM		did not advance	
Sizwe Sydney Mdluli	Triple jump	16.18	27	did not advance	

== Boxing ==
In total, one Swazi athlete participated in the boxing events – Mfamsibili Mnisi in the light flyweight category.

The first round of the light flyweight category took place on 29 July 1992. Mnisi lost to Rogelio Marcelo of Cuba.

Athlete	Event	1 Round	2 Round	3 Round	Quarter-finals	Semi-finals	Final	
Athlete	Event	Opposition Result	Opposition Result	Opposition Result	Opposition Result	Opposition Result	Opposition Result	Rank
Mfamsibili Mnisi	Light flyweight	Rogelio Marcelo (CUB); L RSC-3	did not advance					
