= Chardonnay, Saône-et-Loire =

Chardonnay
- Commune
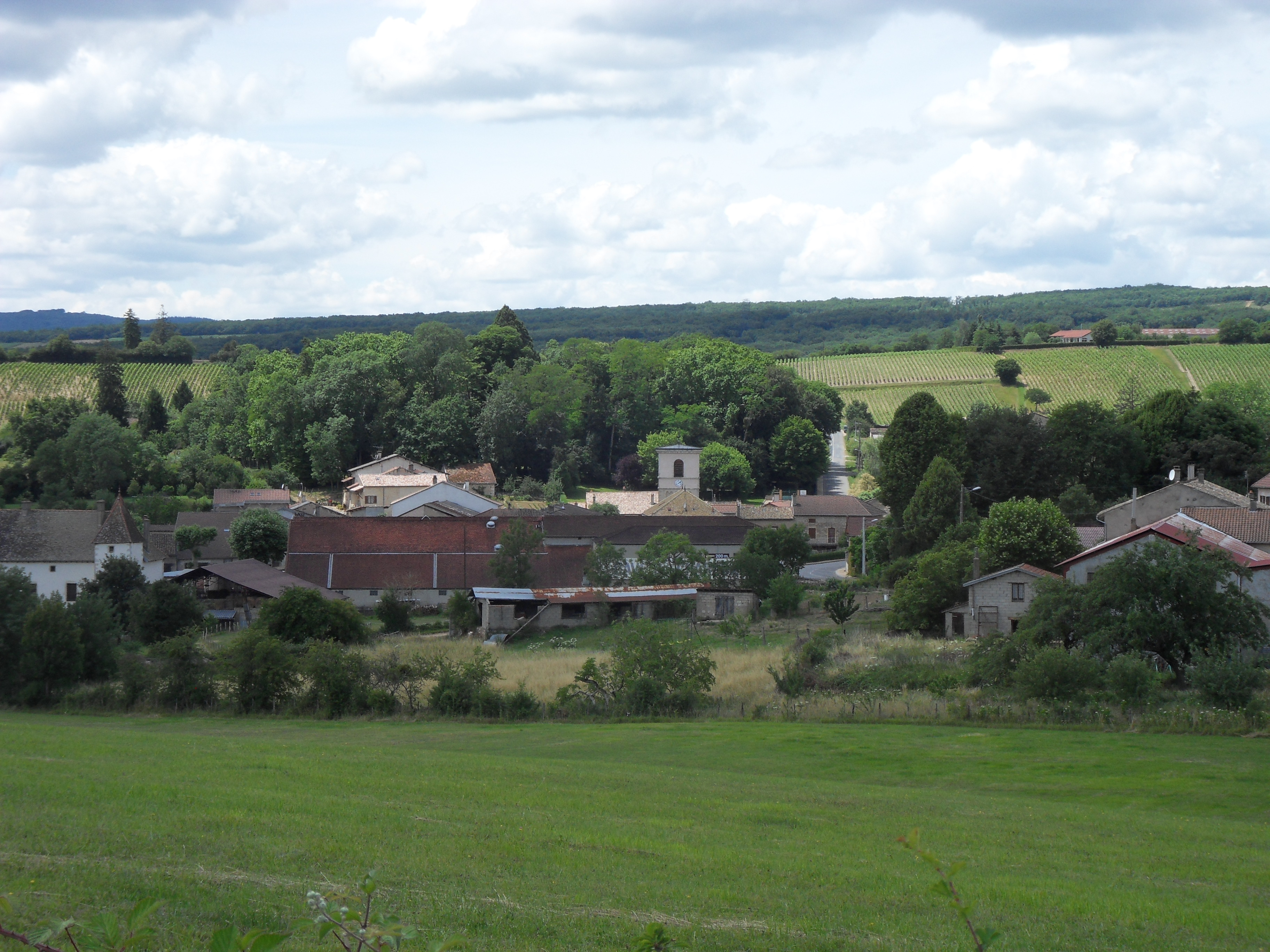
- A general view of Chardonnay

- Coat of arms
- Location of Chardonnay
- Location within France Location within Bourgogne-Franche-Comté
- Coordinates: 46°30′37″N 4°51′48″E
- Country: France
- Region: Bourgogne-Franche-Comté
- Department: Saône-et-Loire
- Arrondissement: Mâcon
- Canton: Tournus
- Intercommunality: Mâconnais - Tournugeois

Government
  - Mayor (2020–2026): Paul Perre
- Area^{1}: 6.37 km^{2} (2.46 sq mi)
- Elevation: 225 m (738 ft)
- Highest elevation: 375 m (1,230 ft)
- Lowest elevation: 220 m (720 ft)
- Population (2023): 207
  - Density: 32.5/km^{2} (84.2/sq mi)
- Time zone: UTC+01:00 (CET)
  - Summer (DST): UTC+02:00 (CEST)
- INSEE/Postal code: 71100 /71700
- ^{1} French Land Register data, which excludes lakes, ponds, glaciers > 1 km^{2} (0.386 sq mi or 247 acres) and river estuaries.

Chardonnay (French pronunciation: [ʃaʁdɔnɛ]) is the commune in the Saône-et-Loire department in the region of Bourgogne-Franche-Comté in eastern France.

The name is a derivative of Cardonnacum, a Latin term to denote the land of Cardus, the owner of the land surrounding this village during the end of the Roman period. The name is also said to mean an area of thistles. Chardonnay and its surrounding Mâconnais region are probably the cradle of the Chardonnay variety of grape, and the semantic origin of the grape.

In 1994 the vineyard co-operative of Chardonnay amalgamated with that of Lugny.

== Sport ==
The European Lure coursing championships for sighthounds of the FCI were held on 23/24/25 July 2010 in Chardonnay.

== See also ==
- Communes of the Saône-et-Loire department
