= Thabiso Dlamini =

Swazi boxer

Personal information
- Nationality: Eswatini
- Born: 27 May 1993 (age 31); Simunye, Eswatini

Sport
- Sport: Boxing

Thabiso Dlamini (born 27 May 1993) is a Swazi boxer. He competed in the 2020 Summer Olympics. He was a batonbearer for the 2022 Commonwealth Games Queen's Baton Relay when the baton came to his nation in December 2021.

Olympic Games
Preceded by Sibusiso Matsenjwa	Flag bearer for Eswatini; Tokyo 2020 with Robyn Young	Succeeded by Hayley Hoy; Chadd Ng Chiu Hing Ning
