= Musa Simelane =

Swazi boxer (born 1974)

Musa Simelane (born 2 February 1974) is a Swazi boxer. Representing Swaziland at the 2000 Summer Olympics, Simelane was defeated in his first round bout against Argentine Israel Héctor Perez.

Olympic Games
Preceded by Daniel Sibandze	Flag bearer for Eswatini; 2000 Sydney	Succeeded by Gcinile Moyane
