= Eswatini at the Olympics =

- IOC code: SWZ
- NOC: Eswatini Olympic and Commonwealth Games Association
- Website: www.socga.org.sz
- Medals: Gold 0 Silver 0 Bronze 0 Total 0

Summer appearances
- 1972; 1976–1980; 1984; 1988; 1992; 1996; 2000; 2004; 2008; 2012; 2016; 2020; 2024

Winter appearances
- 1992; 1994–2026

Eswatini first participated at the Olympic Games in 1972 (as Swaziland). The nation missed the next two games but returned for the 1984 Olympics in Los Angeles and have appeared in all the games since then. The nation made its first and only appearance as of 2026 at the Winter Olympic Games in 1992. In all competitions they have yet to win a medal.

Eswatini has been represented by the Eswatini Olympic and Commonwealth Games Association (formerly the Swaziland Olympic and Commonwealth Games Association) since 1972.

== Medal tables ==
=== Medals in Summer Games ===
Games	Athletes	Gold	Silver	Bronze	Total	Rank
(West Germany) 1972 Munich	2	0	0	0	0	–
(Canada) 1976 Montreal	did not participate					
(Soviet Union) 1980 Moscow	did not participate					
(United States) 1984 Los Angeles	8	0	0	0	0	–
(South Korea) 1988 Seoul	11	0	0	0	0	–
(Spain) 1992 Barcelona	6	0	0	0	0	–
(United States) 1996 Atlanta	6	0	0	0	0	–
(Australia) 2000 Sydney	6	0	0	0	0	–
(Greece) 2004 Athens	3	0	0	0	0	–
(China) 2008 Beijing	4	0	0	0	0	–
(United Kingdom) 2012 London	3	0	0	0	0	–
(Brazil) 2016 Rio de Janeiro	2	0	0	0	0	–
(Japan) 2020 Tokyo	4	0	0	0	0	–
(France) 2024 Paris	3	0	0	0	0	–
(United States) 2028 Los Angeles	future event					
(Australia) 2032 Brisbane	future event					
Total		0	0	0	0	–

=== Medals in Winter Games ===
Games	Athletes	Gold	Silver	Bronze	Total	Rank
(France) 1992 Albertville	1	0	0	0	0	–
1994–2026	did not participate					
(France) 2030 French Alps	future event					
(United States) 2034 Utah	future event					
Total		0	0	0	0	–

== See also ==
- List of flag bearers for Eswatini at the Olympics
- List of participating nations at the Summer Olympic Games
- List of participating nations at the Winter Olympic Games
