= Philip Serjeant =

Sports shooter

Personal information
- Full name: Philip J. Serjeant
- Nationality: Swazi
- Born: 6 October 1929 West Ham, London, England

Sport
- Sport: Sports shooting
- Event(s): Trap, skeet

Philip J. Serjeant (born 6 October 1929) is a Swazi former sports shooter. Born in West Ham, he eventually worked as a professional hunter and salesman in South Africa until he moved to Swaziland (now Eswatini) with his wife. He would eventually compete for Swaziland at the 1972 Summer Olympics, the debut appearance for the nation at a games, making him one of the first Swazi Olympians.

Serjeant would compete in the trap competition and skeet competition. Though he would place last in the former while he did not finish his latter event. Later on, he would own a restaurant in Mbabane during the 1980s.

== Biography ==
Philip J. Serjeant was born on 6 October 1929 in West Ham, London, England, to Martha and Page Serjeant, a hotel proprietor who was based in South Africa. Philip worked as a professional hunter and salesman while residing in South Africa until he moved to Swaziland (now Eswatini) with his wife Vera.

Serjeant would eventually compete for Swaziland at the 1972 Summer Olympics in Munich, Germany. It would be the debut appearance of the nation, making him one of the first Swazi Olympians. He would also be the first and only shooting competitor for the nation at an Olympic Games as of June 2025.

He would first compete in the trap competition from 27 to 29 August in Schießanlage. Out of a possible amount of 200 targets, he would shoot 122 targets and placed last out of the 57 shooters that competed in the event. He would then compete in the skeet competition on 31 August although he would not finish the event and would place unranked.

After his sports career, he would own a restaurant in Mbabane in the 1980s.
