= Swaziland at the 2000 Summer Olympics =

- IOC code: SWZ
- NOC: Swaziland Olympic and Commonwealth Games Association
- Website: www.socga.org.sz

in Sydney
- Competitors: 6 in 4 sports
- Flag bearer: Musa Simelane
- Medals: Gold 0 Silver 0 Bronze 0 Total 0

Summer Olympics appearances (overview)
- 1972; 1976–1980; 1984; 1988; 1992; 1996; 2000; 2004; 2008; 2012; 2016; 2020; 2024

Swaziland competed at the 2000 Summer Olympics in Sydney, Australia.

== Competitors ==
The following is the list of number of competitors in the Games.

Sport	Men	Women	Total
Athletics	1	1	2
Boxing	1	–	1
Swimming	1	1	2
Taekwondo	1	0	1
Total	4	2	6

== Athletics ==
=== Men ===
Athlete	Event	Heat		Quarterfinal		Semifinal		Final	
Athlete	Event	Result	Rank	Result	Rank	Result	Rank	Result	Rank
Lucky Bhembe	Marathon	—N/a						2:23:38	51

=== Women ===
Athlete	Event	Heat		Quarterfinal		Semifinal		Final	
Athlete	Event	Result	Rank	Result	Rank	Result	Rank	Result	Rank
Priscilla Mamba	5000 m	17:30.04	16	—N/a				did not advance	

== Boxing ==
=== Men ===
Athlete	Event	Round of 32	Round of 16	Quarterfinals	Semifinals	Final	
Athlete	Event	Opposition Result	Opposition Result	Opposition Result	Opposition Result	Opposition Result	Rank
Musa Simelane	Featherweight	BYE	Israel Héctor Perez (ARG); L RSC-1	did not advance			

== Swimming ==
=== Men ===
Athlete	Event	Heat		Semifinal		Final	
Athlete	Event	Time	Rank	Time	Rank	Time	Rank
Wickus Nienaber	100 m breaststroke	1:04.98	47	did not advance			

=== Women ===
Athlete	Event	Heat		Semifinal		Final	
Athlete	Event	Time	Rank	Time	Rank	Time	Rank
Lisa de la Motte	100 m butterfly	1:06.70	45	did not advance			

== Taekwondo ==
Athlete	Event	Round of 16	Quarterfinals	Semifinals	Repechage 1	Repechage 2	Final / BM	
Athlete	Event	Opposition Result	Opposition Result	Opposition Result	Opposition Result	Opposition Result	Opposition Result	Rank
Mfanukhona Dlamini	Men's −58 kg	Buftain (KUW); L RSC	did not advance					
