= Ali DeLoof =

American swimmer (born 1994)

- Ali DeLoof at the 29th Summer Universiade 2017, Chinese Taipei

Personal information
- Full name: Alexandra Margaret DeLoof
- Nickname: Ali
- National team: United States
- Born: August 14, 1994 (age 32) Grosse Pointe Park, Michigan
- Height: 5 ft 8 in (173 cm)

Sport
- Sport: Swimming
- Events: Medley relays Freestyle relays 50 backstroke
- Strokes: Freestyle; Backstroke
- Club: Pointe Aquatics Club (2003-2012); Club Wolverine
- College team: University of Michigan
- Coach: Mike Bottom (U. Michigan)
Medal record
Women's swimming
Representing the United States
World Championships (SC)
Gold medal – first place	2016 Windsor	4×100 m freestyle
Gold medal – first place	2016 Windsor	4×50 m freestyle
Gold medal – first place	2016 Windsor	4×100 m medley
Bronze medal – third place	2016 Windsor	50 m backstroke
Pan American Games
Gold medal – first place	2019 Lima	4×100 m mixed freestyle
World University Games
Gold medal – first place	2017 Taipei	50 m backstroke
Silver medal – second place	2017 Taipei	4×100 m medley

Alexandra Margaret "Ali" DeLoof is an American swimmer specializing in backstroke. She is the world record holder in the 4×50 m medley relay. During the 2016 FINA Short Course Worlds in Windsor, Ontario, Canada, she won gold medals in the 4×50 and 4×100 metres medley relays, and won a gold medal as a preliminary swimmer in the 4×100 metres freestyle relay. She also won bronze in the 50 metres backstroke, and placed sixth in the 100 metres backstroke.

== Early life ==
DeLoof was born August 14, 1994, the oldest of three daughters and grew up in Grosse Pointe, Michigan. The daughter of Patricia DeLoof, Ali attended Grosse Pointe South High School, graduating in 2012. Each of her three sisters were accomplished swimmers, and competed at the University of Michigan. During her High School swimming career, Ali earned National Interscholastic Swimming Coaches Association (NISCA) All-American honors a total of seven times. She won titles in her High School conference eleven times, and earned second place finishes in the Division II Michigan High School Athletic Association State Championships a total of three times. During High School from 2003-12, she trained and competed with the Pointe Aquatics Club in Grosse Pointe under Coach Mike O'Connor Sr.

== National, international highlights ==
In elite national competition, at the 2013 U.S. National Championships, she placed eighth in the 50-meter backstroke. She competed from 2011-2015 in the U.S. National Championships, having previously participated in the Jr. National Championships from 2009-2010. As shown in the Medals at the information box at right, in post-college competition at the 2019 Pan American Games in Lima, Peru, she won a gold medal in the 4×100 m mixed freestyle Previously at the 2017 Summer Universiade in Taipei, China, she won a silver medal in the 4×100 m medley, and a gold medal in the 50 meter backstroke.

== Michigan University ==
DeLoof, circa 2017

DeLoof attended Michigan University from 2012-2016, where she competed with the swim team all four years under Head Coach Mike Bottom a former All American swimmer for the University of Southern California. Bottom became Head Coach for the women's team at the University of Michigan in 2013, and was an Olympic coach in six Olympics. During DeLoof's tenure with the team, Bottom helped lead the women's team to Big 10 Championship team titles in 2016, and an NCAA top ten finish the same year. During her collegiate career, she was twice an NCAA All-American, in the 100-yard and 50-yard freestyle events. She received All-American Honorable mention honors four times in events that included the 200-yard medley relay, and the 100 and 200-yard backstroke. In 2015, and 2016, she was a Big10 Conference First Team and Second team All Big 10 honoree. She majored in Psychology, as part of the College of Literature, Science and the Arts. In academics, she was an All-American Scholar for the College Coaches Association of America in 2016, and in 2013 honored by the University of Michigan for academic achievement in athletics.
