= Priscilla Mamba =

Swazi long-distance runner

Priscilla Innocentia Lungile Mamba (born 4 January 1972) is a Swaziland athlete. She competed for Swaziland at the 2000 Summer Olympics in the Women's 5000 metres event. She finished 16th of 17 competitors in her heat and did not advance to the final. She also competed at the 1991, 1999 and the 2003 World Championships.
