= Gcinile Moyane =

Swazi sprinter

Personal information
- Nationality: Eswatini
- Born: 12 May 1980 (age 46) Mbabane, Swaziland
- Height: 1.67 m (5 ft 5 1/2 in)
- Weight: 55 kg (121 lb)

Sport
- Sport: Athletics
- Event: Sprint

Achievements and titles
- Personal best(s): 100 m: 12.78 (1997); 200 m: 25.62 (2004)

Gcinile Moyane (born 12 May 1980 in Mbabane) is a retired female Swazi sprinter who specialized in the 200 metres. Moyane qualified for the Swazi squad in the women's 200 metres at the 2004 Summer Olympics in Athens by receiving a wild card entry slot from IAAF. Running against seven other athletes in heat three, Moyane smashed a Swazi record of 25.62 to claim the sixth and last spot but finished behind leader Cydonie Mothersill of the Cayman Islands by more than three seconds. Moyane failed to advance into the second round as she placed farther from two automatic slots for the next stage and ranked no. 42 overall in the prelims. Moyane was also appointed as the Swazi flag bearer by the National Olympic Committee in the opening ceremony.

Olympic Games
Preceded by Musa Simelane	Flag bearer for Eswatini; 2004 Athens	Succeeded by Temalangeni Dlamini
