= Yul Mark Du Pont =

Swazi swimmer

Personal information
- Born: 4 April 1971 (age 55)

Sport
- Sport: Swimming

Yul Mark Du Pont (born 4 April 1971) is a Swazi swimmer. He competed in three events at the 1988 Summer Olympics.
