= Temalangeni Dlamini =

Swazi sprinter

Personal information
- Nationality: Eswatini
- Born: 16 July 1987 (age 38) Mbabane, Swaziland
- Height: 1.68 m (5 ft 6 in)
- Weight: 58 kg (128 lb)

Sport
- Sport: Athletics
- Event: 400 m
- Team: University of Swaziland

Achievements and titles
- Personal best(s): 400 m – 58.27; 800 m – 2:19.30

Temalangeni Mbali Dlamini (born July 16, 1987 in Mbabane) is a Swazi sprinter. She represented Swaziland at the 2008 Summer Olympics in Beijing, where she became the nation's flag bearer at the opening ceremony. Dlamini competed in the women's 400 metres, where she finished last in the seventh and final heat, with a time of 59.91 seconds. She also achieved her best result at the 2007 IAAF World Championships in Osaka, Japan, with a personal best time of 58.27 seconds.

Olympic Games
Preceded by Gcinile Moyane	Flag bearer for Eswatini; 2008 Beijing	Succeeded by Luke Hall
