= Daniel Sibandze =

Swazi long-distance runner

Personal information
- Nationality: Swazi
- Born: 28 January 1964 (age 62)

Sport
- Sport: Long-distance running
- Event: Marathon

Daniel Tornado Sibandze (born 28 January 1964) is a Swazi long-distance runner. He competed in the men's marathon at the 1996 Summer Olympics.

Olympic Games
Preceded by Keith Fraser	Flag bearer for Eswatini; 1996 Atlanta	Succeeded by Musa Simelane
