= Keith Fraser (skier) =

Swazi alpine skier (born 1968)

Keith Fraser (born 4 February 1968)is a Scottish-born skier who represented Swaziland (as a naturalised citizen of that country) at the 1992 Winter Olympics in Albertville, France. He competed in three events: Slalom, where he failed to finish the first run;Giant slalom, where he came 63rd(starting No. 98 from 131 skiers); and Super-G, finishing 79th (out of 118 skiers). So far, he is the only athlete to have represented Swaziland in the Winter Olympic Games.

Olympic Games
Preceded by Sizwe Sydney Mdluli	Flag bearer for Eswatini; 1992 Albertville	Succeeded by Daniel Sibandze
