= Sipho Dlamini =

Swazi Olympic middle-distance runner

Personal information
- Nationality: Swazi
- Born: 30 November 1972 (age 53) Swaziland
- Height: 180 cm (5 ft 11 in)
- Weight: 65 kg (143 lb)

Sport
- Country: Swaziland
- Sport: Middle-distance running

Sipho Dlamini is a Swazi Olympic middle-distance runner. He represented his country in the men's 1500 meters and the men's 800 meters at the 1992 Summer Olympics. His times were a 1:48.70 and a 3:46.33.
