= Victor Shabangu =

Swazi long jumper (1970–2018)

Personal information
- Nationality: Swazi
- Born: 18 January 1970
- Died: 16 June 2018 (aged 48)

Sport
- Sport: Athletics
- Event: Long jump

Victor Shabangu (18 January 1970 – 16 June 2018) was a Swazi athlete. He competed in the men's long jump at the 1996 Summer Olympics.
