= Lea Ricart Martínez =

Andorran swimmer

Personal information
- Born: 16 January 2001 (age 25)

Sport
- Sport: Swimming

Lea Ricart Martínez (born 16 January 2001) is an Andorran swimmer. She competed in the women's 50 metre freestyle event at the 2017 World Aquatics Championships.
