= Trevor Ncala =

Swazi swimmer

Personal information
- Born: 11 December 1964 (age 61)

Sport
- Sport: Swimming

Trevor Ncala (born 11 December 1964) is a Swazi swimmer. He competed at the 1984 Summer Olympics and the 1988 Summer Olympics.
