= Vusie Dlamini =

Swazi long-distance runner

Personal information
- Nationality: Swazi
- Born: 23 July 1958 (age 67)

Sport
- Sport: Long-distance running
- Event: Marathon

Vusie Thomas Dlamini (born 23 July 1958) is a Swazi long-distance runner. He competed in the men's marathon at the 1988 Summer Olympics.
