= Richard Mabuza =

Swazi distance runner

Personal information
- Born: 3 March 1946
- Died: 2018 (aged 71–72)
Medal record
Men's Athletics
Representing Swaziland
All-Africa Games
Bronze medal – third place	1973 Lagos	Marathon
Gold medal – first place	1978 Algiers	Marathon
Commonwealth Games
Bronze medal – third place	1974 Christchurch	Marathon

Richard Mabuza (born 3 March 1946 – 2018) was a Swazi athlete. He competed at the 1972 Summer Olympics in the men's marathon, where he finished in 17th place.
