= Hayley Hoy =

Swazi swimmer

Personal information
- Full name: Hayley Michelle Hoy
- Nationality: Eswatini
- Born: 1 March 2008 (age 18)
- Height: 1.68 m (5 ft 6 in)

Sport
- Sport: Swimming
- Events: Butterfly, Freestyle

Hayley Michelle Hoy (born 1 March 2008) is a swimmer from Eswatini. She competed at the 2024 Paris Olympics.

== Career ==
She is a member of the Swim Lab swimming club. In May 2022, she received a scholarship from the Olympic training fund available to NOCs. She competed at the 2022 Commonwealth Games in Birmingham, England.

She was selected for the 2023 World Aquatics Championships, held in Fukuoka, Japan.

She won Junior Sportswoman of the Year at the Eswatini National Sports Awards for 2023.

She was selected for the 100m butterfly at the 2024 Paris Olympics. She also had the honour of being a flag bearer for the country at the 2024 Summer Olympics Parade of Nations. She competed in the women’s 100 metres butterfly, but did not make it through the qualifying heats.

Olympic Games
Preceded by Thabiso Dlamini; Robyn Young	Flag bearer for Eswatini; Paris 2024 with Chadd Ng Chiu Hing Ning	Succeeded by Incumbent
