= Isaac Simelane =

Swazi long-distance runner (born 1967)

Personal information
- Nationality: Swazi
- Born: 8 November 1967 (age 58)

Sport
- Sport: Long-distance running
- Event: Marathon

Isaac Mandla Simelane (born 8 November 1967) is a Swazi long-distance runner. He competed in the men's marathon at the 1996 Summer Olympics.
