= Luke Hall (swimmer) =

Swazi swimmer

Personal information
- Full name: Luke Thomas Michael Hall
- Nickname: "Firecracker"
- Born: 16 April 1989 (age 37) Hhohho, Eswatini
- Height: 185 cm (6 ft 1 in)
- Weight: 85 kg (187 lb)

Sport
- Sport: Swimming
- Strokes: freestyle
- College team: University of Toronto
- Coach: Toronto Swim Club
- Updated on 7 January 2014

Luke Thomas Michael Hall (born 16 April 1989) is a Swazi swimmer.

He competed at the 2008 Summer Olympics and the 2012 Summer Olympics where he represented Swaziland. At the 2012 Summer Olympics, he came fourth in his heat with a time of 23.48s.

Olympic Games
Preceded by Temalangeni Dlamini	Flag bearer for Eswatini; 2012 London	Succeeded by Sibusiso Matsenjwa
