= Robyn Young (swimmer) =

Swazi swimmer (born 2000)

Personal information
- Born: 19 December 2000 (age 25)

Sport
- Sport: Swimming

Robyn Young (born 19 December 2000) is a Swazi swimmer. She competed in the women's 50 metre backstroke event at the 2017 World Aquatics Championships. In 2018, she competed in the girls' 50 metre backstroke event at the 2018 Summer Youth Olympics held in Buenos Aires, Argentina. She also competed in the girls' 100 metre backstroke and girls' 100 metre freestyle events. In 2021, she competed in the women's 50 metre freestyle event at the 2020 Summer Olympics held in Tokyo, Japan.

Olympic Games
Preceded by Sibusiso Matsenjwa	Flag bearer for Eswatini; Tokyo 2020 with Thabiso Dlamini	Succeeded by Hayley Hoy; Chadd Ng Chiu Hing Ning
