= Simanga Dlamini =

Swazi swimmer

Personal information
- Nationality: Eswatini
- Born: 8 October 1997 (age 27); Lobamba

Sport
- Sport: Swimming

Simanga Dlamini (born 8 October 1997) is a Swazi swimmer. He competed in the 2020 Summer Olympics.
