= Chadd Ning =

Swazi swimmer

Personal information
- Full name: Chadd Ning
- Nationality: Eswatini
- Born: June 29, 2006 (age 20)
- Education: Plymouth College

Sport
- Sport: Swimming
- Strokes: Breaststroke, Butterfly
- Club: Leander Swimming Club

Chadd Ng Chiu Hing Ning (born 29 June 2006) is a swimmer from Eswatini who participated in the men's 100m breaststroke at the 2024 Paris Olympics. He also represented Eswatini at the 2024 World Aquatics Championship in Qatar. He has Mauritian Chinese ancestry.

== Career ==
Ning was selected for the 2023 World Aquatics Championships, held in Fukuoka, Japan. In January 2024, he was selected for the 2024 World Aquatics Championships in Doha, Qatar. He set a new personal best in the 100m breaststroke event. He was selected for the 100m butterfly at the 2024 Paris Olympics. Ning also had the honour of being a flag bearer for his country at the 2024 Summer Olympics Parade of Nations. He competed in the men’s 100 metres breaststroke, but did not make it through the qualifying heats.

== Personal life ==
Ning is a member of Leander Swimming Club in Plymouth, Devon where he attends Plymouth College.
