= Flag of Eswatini =

Kingdom of Eswatini
- Use: National flag
- Proportion: 2∶3
- Adopted: 6 October 1968
- Design: A horizontal triband of blue (top and bottom) and yellow-edged red (triple width) with a large black and white Nguni shield covering two spears and a staff decorated with feather tassels called injobo (bunches of feathers of the widowbird and the lourie) all centered horizontally on the red band
- Designed by: King Sobhuza II
- Use: National flag
- Proportion: 2∶3
- Use: National flag
- Proportion: 2∶3
- Use: National flag
- Proportion: 2∶3
- Adopted: 2011

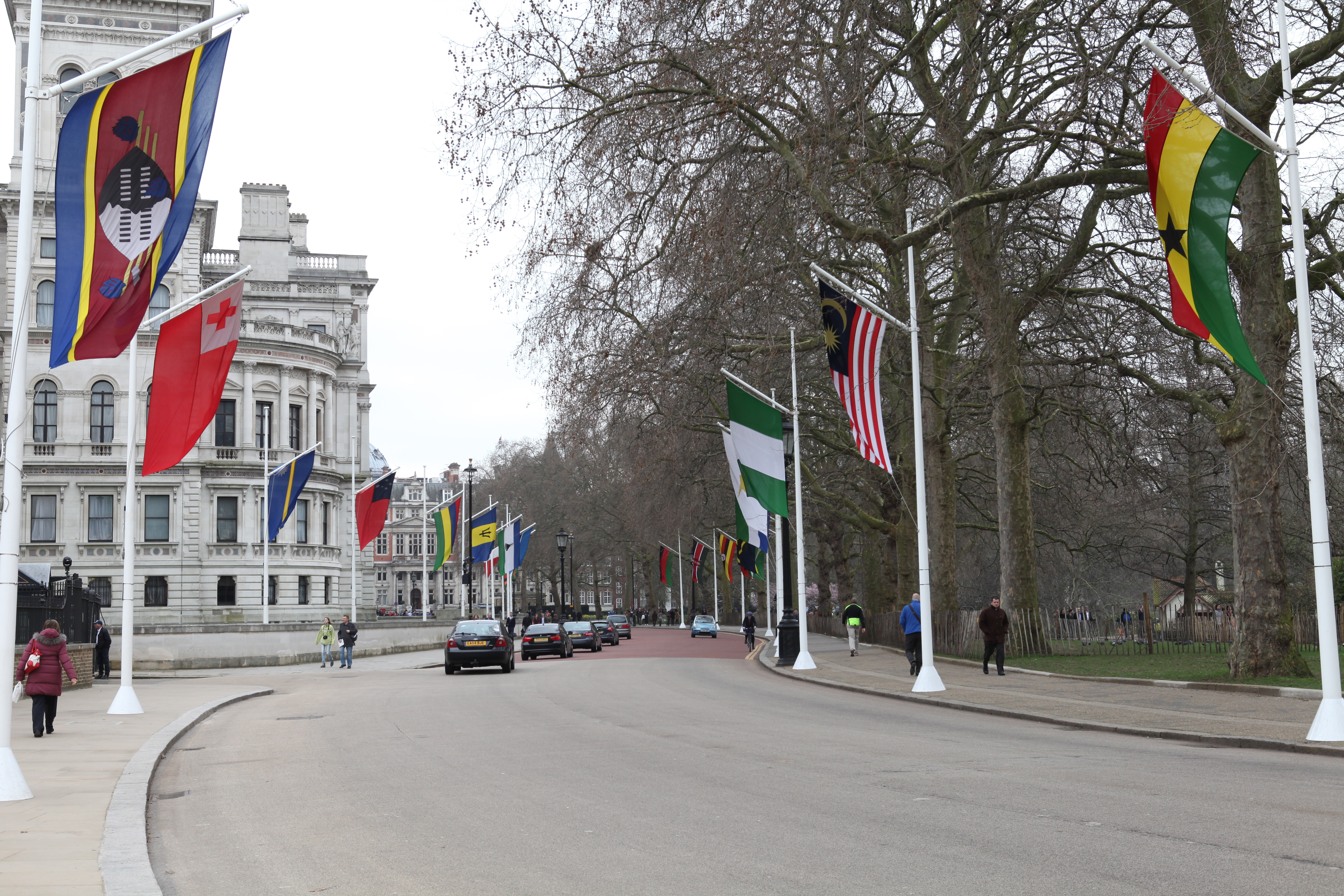
Commonwealth Day, 2014, London: Swazi flag on the extreme left

The flag of Eswatini was adopted on 6 October 1968. After Eswatini (then known as Swaziland) gained its independence from the United Kingdom one month before. The design by King Sobhuza II features a black and white shield called the Nguni shield, with a staff and two spears, on a field of blue, yellow, and red horizontal bands.

== History ==
The flag is based on the military flag given by King Sobhuza II to the Swazi Pioneer Corps in 1941 to remind them of the nation's military traditions. On 25 April 1967, the day the pledge of oath was taken by the king, the flag was hoisted for the first time. The College of Arms in London registered the flag on 30 October 1967. The first official hoisting of the flag was conducted on this day.

== Specifications ==
The flag is rectangular with length and breadth in a ratio of 3:2 respectively. The red stands for past battles, the blue for peace and stability, and the yellow for the resources of Eswatini. The central focus of the flag is a Nguni shield and two spears, symbolising protection from the country's enemies. Its colour is meant to show that white and black people live in peaceful coexistence in Eswatini.

The flag has five horizontal stripes — two blue stripes at the top and bottom while the center stripe is red, and two thin yellow stripes border the red stripe. On the red stripe is an ox hide combat shield from the traditional Swazi Emabutfo Regiment, laid horizontally. The shield is reinforced by a staff from which hangs injobo tassels — bunches of feathers of the widowbird and the lourie, which are only used by the king – and two assegais above it. In 2011, some versions of the flag began using black for the colour of the tassels to match the widowbird's natural colour.

The flag has a variant with lighter shades described by the government's visual identity manual and regularly used on the government's website and other social medias. Sometimes, a variant with black tassels and white spears can be seen during governmental press meetings and international affairs.

== Colors ==
Color Models	Red	Yellow	Blue	Black	White
RGB	177-12-12	255-217-0	62-94-185	0-0-0	255-255-255
HEX	#B10C0C	#FFD900	#3E5EB9	#000000	#FFFFFF
CMYK	0-93-93-31	0-15-100-0	66-49-0-27	0-0-0-100	0-0-0-0

== Historical flags ==
Flag of Swaziland (c. 1890–1894) *some people say 1880s-1894

Flag of Swaziland (1894–1902)

Flag of Swaziland Protectorate (1902–1968)

== Royal flags ==
Royal standard of Eswatini

Queen Mother standard of Eswatini
