= Eswatini Olympic and Commonwealth Games Association =

National Olympic Committee

- Country: Eswatini
- Code: SWZ
- Created: 1968
- Recognized: 1972
- Continental Association: ANOCA
- Headquarters: Lobamba, Eswatini
- President: Peter Shongwe
- Secretary General: Muriel Hofer
- Website: EOCGA.org.sz

The Eswatini Olympic and Commonwealth Games Association (EOCGA), previously the Swaziland Olympic and Commonwealth Games Association (IOC code: SWZ), is the National Olympic Committee representing Eswatini. It was created in 1968 and officially recognised by the International Olympic Committee in 1972. Following the country's name change in April 2018, the Swaziland Olympic and Commonwealth Games Association changed its name to the Eswatini Olympic and Commonwealth Games Association.

In 2023 EOCGA moved headquarters from Mbabane to Lobamba. New site unveiled by the country's Prime Minister Cleopas Dlamini.

== Presidents ==
- Zombodze Magagula: 2013–2017
- Peter Shongwe: 2017–present

== See also ==
- Eswatini at the Olympics
- Eswatini at the Commonwealth Games
